= Mustafo Akhmedov =

Tajikistani amateur wrestler

Personal information
- Full name: Mustafo Dzhumaboevich Akhmedov
- Nationality: Tajikistani
- Born: 2 January 2002 (age 24) Chorkuh, Sughd Region, Tajikistan
- Height: 1.70 m (5 ft 7 in)
- Weight: 70 kg (150 lb)

Sport
- Country: Tajikistan
- Sport: Wrestling
- Event: Freestyle
- Club: Olympic training center (Khasavyurt, Dagestan)
- Coached by: Ali Iskhakov
Medal record
Representing Tajikistan
Men's Freestyle Wrestling
Asian Championships
Bronze medal – third place	2026 Bishkek	74 kg
CIS Games
Silver medal – second place	2021 Kazan	70 kg
Bronze medal – third place	2023 Soligorsk	70 kg

Mustafo Dzhumaboevich Akhmedov (born 2 January 2002 in Chorkuh, Tajikistan) is a Tajikistani freestyle wrestler who claimed the silver medal at the 2021 CIS Games and 2023 U23 Asian championships.

== Background ==
He was born in Chorkuh village, Tajikistan. At the age of 12 he started freestyle wrestling. His personal coach is Dagestani Ali Iskhakov in Khasavyurt, Russia.

== Sport career ==
Akhmedov was runner-up at the 2021 CIS Games. In 2022, he won the bronze medal at the 2022 U23 Asian championships in Bishkek, Kyrgyzstan. In January 2023, Akhmedov won the senior Tajikistan national championships at 70 kilos. In June 2023, Mustafo competed at the U23 Asian championships, where he finished at the second place. As well, in August 2023, he won the bronze medal at 2023 CIS Games. In January 2024, he won the Tajikistan nationals again.

== Championships and achievements ==
- 2021 CIS Games – 2nd
- 2022 U23 Asian Championships – 3rd
- 2023, 2024 Tajikistan national championships – 1st
- 2023 U23 Asian Championships – 2nd
- 2023 CIS Games – 3rd

== Personal life ==
He lives in Khasavyurt, Dagestan, Russia. He studies in Dagestan State University.
