= 2023 CIS Games =

Multi-sport event in Belarus

- Country: Belarus
- Motto: Strong character – bright game! (Сильный характер – яркая игра!)
- Edition: 2nd
- Nations: 9 (+13 Invited)
- Events: 20 Sports
- Dates: 4 - 14 August 2023
- Website: https://belarus2023games.by/en/

The 2023 CIS Games is the second edition of the CIS Games which took place in Belarus in 2023. Athletes from Russia and 8 other member states of the Commonwealth of Independent States (CIS) competed in the games, with athletes from other nations invited.

== Preparation ==
On 24 March 2022, the organizing committee has been created in Belarus to hold the II Games of the CIS countries in 2023.

1st edition: 1,139 athletes aged 14 to 23 years from 9 CIS countries.

2nd CIS Games 2,214 athletes from 22 countries.

== The games ==
=== Sports ===
==== List of Sports ====
1. Sport of athletics;
2. Swimming;
3. Bullseye shooting;
4. Target archery;
5. Modern pentathlon;
6. Olympic weightlifting;
7. Rhythmic gymnastics;
- Martial arts:
1. Boxing;
2. Muay Thai;
3. Karate;
4. Judo (16)
5. Sambo;
6. Wrestling (30)
- Team sport:
1. Mini-football (1)
2. 3x3 basketball (2)
3. Volleyball (2)
4. Beach volleyball (2)
5. Handball (2)
6. Futsal (2)
7. Beach soccer (1)
8. Field hockey.

=== Core Nations ===
1. Armenia
2. Azerbaijan (177)
3. Belarus (host)
4. Kazakhstan
5. Kyrgyzstan
6. Russia
7. Tajikistan
8. Turkmenistan
9. Uzbekistan

==== Withdrawn ====
1. ~~Moldova~~

=== Guest Nations ===
1. Egypt (12)
2. Iran (12)
3. Cuba
4. Lebanon
5. United Arab Emirates (12)
6. Vietnam
7. Pakistan
8. Mongolia
9. Bahrain
10. Malaysia
11. Kuwait
12. Oman (12)
13. Venezuela

== Medal table ==
* Host nation (Belarus)

2023 CIS Games medal table
| Rank | Nation | Gold | Silver | Bronze | Total |
|---|---|---|---|---|---|
| 1 | Russia | 149 | 89 | 50 | 288 |
| 2 | Belarus* | 48 | 78 | 110 | 236 |
| 3 | Uzbekistan | 28 | 25 | 53 | 106 |
| 4 | Azerbaijan | 10 | 17 | 35 | 62 |
| 5 | Kazakhstan | 7 | 14 | 32 | 53 |
| 6 | Armenia | 2 | 2 | 4 | 8 |
| 7 | Kyrgyzstan | 1 | 8 | 18 | 27 |
| 8 | Tajikistan | 1 | 3 | 9 | 13 |
| 9 | Vietnam | 0 | 5 | 2 | 7 |
| 10 | Turkmenistan | 0 | 3 | 15 | 18 |
| 11 | Iran | 0 | 1 | 1 | 2 |
| 12 | Mongolia | 0 | 1 | 0 | 1 |
| 13 | Egypt | 0 | 0 | 4 | 4 |
| 14 | Cuba | 0 | 0 | 1 | 1 |
| Totals (14 entries) | | 246 | 246 | 334 | 826 |

== See also ==
- 2021 CIS Games
- University International Sports Festival
- 2024 BRICS Games
- 2024 World Friendship Games
