= CIS Games =

Regional multi-sport event

CIS Games (Russian: Игры стран СНГ) is a multi-sport event held among the member countries of the Commonwealth of Independent States, meanwhile guest nations are invited in the second edition of the games, held in Minsk, Belarus. The first edition of the games is held in Kazan, Russia a year after postponement due to the COVID-19 pandemic.

== Editions ==
Edition	Year	Opening ceremony	Closing ceremony	Host city	Countries	Sports	Best performing nation	References
1	2021	4 September	11 September	(Russia) Kazan	9	16	Russia	
2	2023	4 August	14 August	(Belarus) Minsk	22	20	Russia	
3	2025	28 September	8 October	(Azerbaijan) Ganja	13	22	Russia	
4	2027							

== Participation eligibility ==
=== Age ===
The games are open to athletes aged 23 and younger, Olympic and world champions could participate as long as they satisfy the age requirement.

=== Nation ===
Commonwealth of Independent States

== Medals (2021-2023) ==
CIS Games accumulative medal table
Rank	Nation	Gold	Silver	Bronze	Total
1	Russia	263	131	109	503
2	Belarus	56	110	139	305
3	Uzbekistan	51	57	89	197
4	Kazakhstan	25	49	85	159
5	Azerbaijan	25	33	64	122
6	Kyrgyzstan	4	18	43	65
7	Armenia	2	7	12	21
8	Tajikistan	1	10	16	27
9	Vietnam	0	5	2	7
10	Turkmenistan	0	3	15	18
11	Moldova	0	2	11	13
12	Iran	0	1	1	2
13	Mongolia	0	1	0	1
14	Egypt	0	0	4	4
15	Cuba	0	0	1	1
Totals (15 entries)		427	427	591	1,445

== See also ==
- 2023 University International Sports Festival
- BRICS Games
- 2024 Friendship Games
- Games of the Future
- International Deaf Sport Festival 2023, Allschwil, Switzerland
- Summer Games of Deaf Athletes in Russia 2023
- Russian–Chinese Winter Youth Games
- Children of Asia International Sports Games
- Intervision 2025
- World Friendship Games
- 2026 Parallel Football World Cup (Proposed)
