= Phygital football at the 2024 BRICS Games =

Tournament details
- Host country: Russia
- Dates: 20–22 June
- Teams: 11
- Venue(s): Basket-Hall Kazan, Kazan

Final positions
- Champions: Russia (1st title)
- Runners-up: Kazakhstan
- Third place: Venezuela
- Fourth place: Brazil

Tournament statistics
- Matches played: 18

Phygital football at the 2024 BRICS Games in Kazan was held from 20 June to 22 June 2024.

== Medal summary ==
=== Medal table ===
* Host nation (Russia)

Rank	Nation	Gold	Silver	Bronze	Total
1	Russia (RUS)*	1	0	0	1
2	Kazakhstan (KAZ)	0	1	0	1
3	Venezuela (VEN)	0	0	1	1
Totals (3 entries)		1	1	1	3

=== Medalists ===
Event	Gold	Silver	Bronze
Phygital football	Russia; Daniil Abeldyaev; Robert Fakhretdinov; Anton Klenov; Stepan Mikhovich; Daniil Ilyin; Artem Yelkin; Alexander Kriger	Kazakhstan; Chernomordov V.I. Yessentayev O. Kukumbayev B. Anshakov A. Apsalyamov B. Bexeitov A.A. Bexeitov A.A. Starodubtsev R.S. Zenin F.	Venezuela; Rosales Garcia G. Briceno Briceno B. Miro Zambrano A. Corral Leon I. Oropeza De Abreu M. Molina Martinez D. Riveros Eugui A.

== Participants teams ==
- Abkhazia
- Belarus
- Brazil
- Cuba
- Iran
- Kazakhstan
- Russia
- South Ossetia
- Uzbekistan
- Venezuela
- Vietnam

== Format ==
Competitors first play a digital stage and a physical stage in teams of four.

In the group stage, if a match is level at the end of normal playing time, penalty series shall be determine the winner. Each team earns three points for a win in regulation time, two points for a win in penalty series, one point for losing penalty series, and no points for a defeat. The top two teams of each group advance to the quarter-finals.

== Results ==
=== Group A ===
Pos	Team	Pld	W	PKW	PKL	L	GF	GA	GD	Pts	Qualification
1	Russia (H)	2	2	0	0	0	33	6	+27	6	Advance to knockout stage
2	Venezuela	2	1	0	0	1	25	21	+4	3	Advance to knockout stage
3	South Ossetia	2	0	0	0	2	8	39	−31	0	

(H) Host
June 20, 2024

Russia	18–2	South Ossetia

Basket-Hall Kazan, Kazan

June 20, 2024

Russia	15–4	Venezuela

Basket-Hall Kazan, Kazan

June 21, 2024

South Ossetia	6–21	Venezuela

Basket-Hall Kazan, Kazan

=== Group B ===
Pos	Team	Pld	W	PKW	PKL	L	GF	GA	GD	Pts	Qualification
1	Uzbekistan	2	1	1	0	0	19	17	+2	5	Advance to knockout stage
2	Abkhazia	2	1	0	1	0	18	15	+3	4	Advance to knockout stage
3	Iran	2	0	0	0	2	12	17	−5	0	

June 20, 2024

Abkhazia	8–5	Iran

Basket-Hall Kazan, Kazan

June 20, 2024

Abkhazia	10–10	Uzbekistan
Penalties
	4–5

Basket-Hall Kazan, Kazan

June 21, 2024

Iran	7–9	Uzbekistan

Basket-Hall Kazan, Kazan

=== Group C ===
Pos	Team	Pld	W	PKW	PKL	L	GF	GA	GD	Pts	Qualification
1	Kazakhstan	1	1	0	0	0	5	4	+1	3	Advance to knockout stage
2	Brazil	1	0	0	0	1	4	5	−1	0	Advance to knockout stage
3	Turkmenistan	0	0	0	0	0	0	0	0	0	Withdrew

June 20, 2024

Brazil	4–5	Kazakhstan

Basket-Hall Kazan, Kazan

=== Group D ===
Pos	Team	Pld	W	PKW	PKL	L	GF	GA	GD	Pts	Qualification
1	Cuba	2	0	2	0	0	14	14	0	4 (Note: Tied on head-to-head result (Cuba 10–10 PK 8-7 Belarus).)	Advance to knockout stage
2	Belarus	2	1	0	1	0	24	17	+7	4 (Note: Tied on head-to-head result (Cuba 10–10 PK 8-7 Belarus).)	Advance to knockout stage
3	Vietnam	2	0	0	1	1	11	18	−7	1	

Notes:
June 20, 2024

Cuba	4–4	Vietnam
Penalties
	3–1

Basket-Hall Kazan, Kazan

June 20, 2024

Cuba	10–10	Belarus
Penalties
	8–7

Basket-Hall Kazan, Kazan

June 21, 2024

Vietnam	7–14	Belarus

Basket-Hall Kazan, Kazan

=== Knockout round ===
Quarterfinals
June 21
Kazakhstan	17
Belarus	8
June 21
Uzbekistan	6
Venezuela	8
June 21
Cuba	6
Brazil	8
June 21
Russia	9
Abkhazia	3

Semifinals
June 22
Kazakhstan	12
Venezuela	2
June 22
Brazil	2
Russia	8

Gold medal match
June 22
Kazakhstan	7
Russia	9
Bronze medal match
June 22
Brazil	5
Venezuela	6

=== Quarter-finals ===
June 21, 2024

Kazakhstan	17–8	Belarus

Basket-Hall Kazan, Kazan

June 21, 2024

Uzbekistan	6–8	Venezuela

Basket-Hall Kazan, Kazan

June 21, 2024

Cuba	6–8	Brazil

Basket-Hall Kazan, Kazan

June 21, 2024

Russia	9–3	Abkhazia

Basket-Hall Kazan, Kazan

=== Semi-finals ===
June 22, 2024

Kazakhstan	12–2	Venezuela

Basket-Hall Kazan, Kazan

June 22, 2024

Brazil	2–8	Russia

Basket-Hall Kazan, Kazan

=== Third place match ===
June 22, 2024

Brazil	5–6	Venezuela

Basket-Hall Kazan, Kazan

=== Final ===
June 22, 2024

Kazakhstan	7–9	Russia
	Report

Basket-Hall Kazan, Kazan

== Final Standing ==
Rank	Team
1	Russia
2	Kazakhstan
3	Venezuela
4	Brazil
5	Abkhazia
5	Belarus
5	Uzbekistan
5	Cuba
9	Vietnam
9	Iran
9	South Ossetia
