= 2023 Summer Universiade =

2023 Summer Universiade may refer to:

- 2021 Summer World University Games (held in 2023)
- 2023 Summer World University Games
