= Table Tennis at the 2024 BRICS Games =

International competition in Kazan, Russia

Table tennis at the 2024 BRICS Games
- Venue: Boxing and Table Tennis Centre
- Location: Kazan, Russia
- Dates: 12–16 June 2024

Table tennis competitions at the 2024 BRICS Games in Kazan, Russia was held from 12 June to 16 June 2024.

== Medal ==
=== Medal table ===
* Host nation (Russia)

Rank	Nation	Gold	Silver	Bronze	Total
1	Russia (RUS)*	4	2	2	8
2	China (CHN)	0	2	1	3
3	India (IND)	0	0	2	2
3	Iran (IRN)	0	0	2	2
5	Belarus (BLR)	0	0	1	1
Totals (5 entries)		4	4	8	16

=== Medalists ===
The winners were as follows:

Event	Gold	Silver	Bronze
Men	Kirill Skachkov; Russia	Vladimir Sidorenko; Russia	Fidel Rafeeque Snehit Suravajjula; India Li Tianyang; China
Women	Mariia Tailakova; Russia	Elizabet Abraamian; Russia	Polina Mikhaylova; Russia Yana Noskova; Russia
Mens's Team	Russia; Vladimir Sidorenko; Maksim Grebnev; Kirill Skachkov; Nikita Artemenko; Lev Katsman	China; Chen Junsong; Wang Kaibo; Li Tianyang; Tao Yuchang; Xiong Mengyang	Belarus; Heorhi Kunats; Nikon Shutov; Danill Vitorski; Danill Savatsyan; Arseni Razchanka Iran; Mohammad Moustavi Taher; Mahdi Madankan; Heidari Matin; Taherkhani Hamidreza
Women's Team	Russia; Elizabet Abraamian; Polina Mikhaylova; Mariia Tailakova; Yana Noskova; Vlada Voronina	China; Jin Mengyan; Ma Xiaohui; Hu Yi; Yan Yutong; Wang Xiaonan	India; Baisya Poymantee; Dutta Moumita; Sivasankar Yashini Iran; Sara Shahsavari; Fatemeh Yariseraji; Elina Rahimi; Seraji Saba

== Results ==
=== Men's single ===
==== Group stage ====
Group 1
P	Player	Skachkov	Vasilyan	Markovic	Pts
1	Kirill Skachkov (RUS)	–	3–0	3–0	4
2	Avet Vasilyan (ARM)	0–3	–	3–1	3
3	Damjan Markovic (SRP)	0–3	1–3	–	2

Group 2
P	Player	Sidorenko	Camarco Rodrigues	Karchava	Pts
1	Vladimir Sidorenko (RUS)	–	3–0	3–0	4
2	Luis Eduardo Camarco Rodrigues (BRA)	0–3	–	3–0	3
3	Renat Karchava (ABH)	0–3	0–3	–	2

Group 3
P	Player	Katsman	Mahfoodh	Odinaev	Pts
1	Lev Katsman (RUS)	–	3–1	3–0	4
2	Sayed Mahfoodh (BHR)	1–3	–	3–0	3
3	Nekruz Odinaev (TJK)	0–3	0–3	–	2

Group 4
P	Player	Grebnev	Ahmadzade	Yaqoubi	Pts
1	Maksim Grebnev (RUS)	–	3–1	3–0	4
2	Adil Ahmadzade (AZE)	1–3	–	3–0	3
3	Hassan Aqa Yaqoubi (AFG)	0–3	0–3	–	2

Group 5
P	Player	Suravajjula	Mammadov	Mohmadian	Pts
1	Fidel Rafeeque Snehit Suravajjula (IND)	–	3–0	3–0	4
2	Nihad Mammadov (AZE)	0–3	–	3–0	3
3	Hossain Mohmadian(AFG)	0–3	0–3	–	2

Group 6
P	Player	Artemenko	Sultonov	Gabliya	Pts
1	Nikita Artemenko (RUS)	–	3–0	3–0	4
2	Ubaydullo Sultonov (TJK)	0–3	–	3–2	3
3	Leon Gabliya (ABH)	0–3	2–3	–	2

Group 7
P	Player	Harutyunyan	Chandra	Couri	Pts
1	Harutyun Harutyunyan (ARM)	–	3–1	3–0	4
2	Jeet Chandra (IND)	1–3	–	3–0	3
3	Danilo Rolim Couri (BRA)	0–3	0–3	–	2

Group 8
P	Player	Kunats	Marcetic	Bekoev	Pts
1	Heorhi Kunats (BLR)	–	3–0	3–0	4
2	Sinisa Marcetic (SRP)	0–3	–	3–1	3
3	Edvard Bekoev (OSS)	0–3	1–3	–	2

Group 9
P	Player	Ghosh	Tao	Gaybakyan	Pts
1	Anirban Ghosh (IND)	–	3–2	3–0	4
2	Yuchang Tao (CHN)	2–3	–	3–0	3
3	Ruben Gaybakyan (ARM)	0–3	0–3	–	2

Group 10
P	Player	Junsong	Madankan	Davitaya	Pts
1	Junsong Chen (CHN)	–	3–0	3–0	4
2	Mahdi Madankan (IRI)	0–3	–	3–0	3
3	Lasha Davitaya (ABH)	0–3	0–3	–	2

Group 11
P	Player	Rashed	Savastsyan	Allahverdiyev	Pts
1	Rashed Rashed (BHR)	–	3–0	3–0	4
2	Daniil Savastsyan (BLR)	0–3	–	3–1	3
3	Vazir Allahverdiyev (AZE)	0–3	1–3	–	2

Group 12
P	Player	Tianyang	Hajili	Saadat	Pts
1	Tianyang Li (CHN)	–	3–0	3–0	4
2	Rustam Hajili (AZE)	0–3	–	3–0	3
3	Wahidullah Saadat(AFG)	0–3	0–3	–	2

Group 13
P	Player	Taherkhani	Saleh	Vitorski	Pts
1	Hamidreza Taherkhani (IRI)	–	3–1	3–0	4
2	Mohamed Saleh (BHR)	0–3	–	3–2	3
3	Daniil Vitorski (BLR)	1–3	2–3	–	2

Group 14
P	Player	Wang	Heidari	Tagami	Ismoilzoda	Pts
1	Kaibo Wang (CHN)	–	3–0	3–0	WD	4
2	Matin Heidari (IRI)	0–3	–	3–0	WD	3
3	Felipe Eiki Tagami Ikeda (BRA)	0–3	0–3	–	WD	2
4	Ibrokhim Ismoilzoda (TJK)	WD	WD	WD	–	WD

Group 15
P	Player	Hasanov	Shutov	Bjelajac	Sharafi	Pts
1	Jamshed Hasanov (TJK)	–	3–2	3–0	3–0	6
2	Nikon Shutov (BLR)	2–3	–	3–1	3–0	5
3	Bojan Bjelajac (SRP)	0–3	1–3	–	3–0	4
4	Ahmad Monib Sharafi(AFG)	0–3	0–3	0–3	–	3

Group 16
P	Player	Mousavitaher	Pejic	Ali	Chakryan	Pts
1	Seyedmohammad Mousavitaher (IRI)	–	3–1	3–0	3-0	6
2	Dario Pejic (SRP)	1–3	–	3–0	3-0	5
3	Fadhel Ali (BHR)	0–3	0–3	–	3-0	4
4	Artur Chakryan (ABH)	0-3	0-3	WD	–	2

==== Tournament bracket ====
Round of 32
Kirill Skachkov (RUS)	11	11	11
Dario Pejic (SRP)	4	8	3
Luis Eduardo Camarco Rodrigues (BRA)	11	11	4	6	4
Wang Kaibo (CHN)	8	8	11	11	11
Hamidreza Taherkhani (IRI)	11	11	11
Sinisa Marcetic (SRP)	5	6	5
Adil Ahmadzade (AZE)	2	5	11	7
Nikita Artemenko (RUS)	11	11	9	11
Fidel Rafeeque Snehit Suravajula (IND)	11	5	11	11
Yuchang Tao (CHN)	9	11	9	9
Daniil Savastyan (BLR)	7	8	8
Jamshed Hasanov (TJK)	11	11	11
Junsong Chen (CHN)	11	11	11
Rustam Hajili (AZE)	2	3	7
Jeet Chandra (IND)	11	9	11	11	11
Lev Katsman (RUS)	13	11	9	6	9
Maksim Grebnev (RUS)	11	16	11
Sayed Mahfoodh (BHR)	8	14	0
Ubaydullo Sultonov (TJK)	4	2	7
Anirban Ghosh (IND)	11	11	11
Li Tianyang (CHN)	11	11	11
Nihad Mammadov (AZE)	6	7	5
Matin Heidari (IRI)	11	11	11
Heorhi Kunats (BLR)	6	9	6
Harutyun Harutyunyan (ARM)	9	4	11	9
Mahdi Madankan (IRI)	11	11	9	11
Avet Vasilian (ARM)	11	6	5	11	5
Rashed Rashed (BHR)	9	11	11	8	11
Seyedmohammad Mousavitahe (IRI)	11	11	11
Nikon Shutov (BLR)	8	6	10
Mohamed Saleh (BHR)	9	2	6
Vladimir Sidorenko (RUS)	11	11	11

Round of 16
Skachkov (RUS)	11	11	9	11
Wang Kaibo (CHN)	8	6	11	7
Taherkhani (IRI)	3	6	9
Artemenko (RUS)	11	11	11
Suravajula (IND)	11	11	9	11
Hasanov (TJK)	6	7	11	8
Junsong Chen (CHN)	6	6	12	11	8
Chandra (IND)	11	11	10	7	11
Grebnev (RUS)	11	9	11	11
Ghosh (IND)	7	11	6	8
Li Tianyang (CHN)	11	11	8	11
Heidari (IRI)	5	6	11	7
Madankan (IRI)	7	11	13	4	11
Rashed (BHR)	11	2	11	11	7
Mousavitahe (IRI)	10	7	14	9
Sidorenko (RUS)	12	11	12	11

Quarterfinals
Skachkov (RUS)	11	11	14
Artemenko (RUS)	5	9	12
Suravajula (IND)	11	11	6	10	11
Chandra (IND)	2	8	11	12	8
Grebnev (RUS)	11	11	7	8	10
Li Tianyang (CHN)	5	8	11	11	12
Madankan (IRI)	6	9	7
Sidorenko (RUS)	11	11	11

Semifinals
Skachkov (RUS)	11	9	11	11
Suravajula (IND)	7	11	8	6
Li Tianyang (CHN)	8	11	9	7
Sidorenko (RUS)	11	9	11	11

Final
Kirill Skachkov (RUS)	7	6	11	11	11
Vladimir Sidorenko (RUS)	11	11	5	9	8

=== Women's single ===
==== Group stage ====
Group 1
P	Player	Mikhailova	Gnjatic	Seraji	Pts
1	Polina Mikhailova (RUS)	–	3–0	3–0	4
2	Marija Gnjatic (SRP)	0–3	–	3–1	3
3	Saba Seraji (IRI)	0–3	1–3	–	2

Group 2
P	Player	Noskova	Ma	Elbakieva	Pts
1	Yana Noskova (RUS)	–	3–1	3–0	4
2	Ma Xiaohui (CHN)	1–3	–	3–0	3
3	Irina Elbakieva (OSS)	0–3	0–3	–	2

Group 3
P	Player	Tailakova	Dutta	Kvarchiya	Pts
1	Mariya Tailakova (RUS)	–	3–0	3–0	4
2	Moumita Dutta (IND)	0–3	–	3–0	3
3	Erika Kvarchiya (ABH)	0–3	0–3	–	2

Group 4
P	Player	Abramian	Shahsavari	Tsimashkova	Pts
1	Elizabet Abramian (RUS)	–	3–1	3–0	4
2	Sara Shahsavari (IRI)	1–3	–	3–0	3
3	Lizaveta Tsimashkova (BLR)	0–3	0–3	–	2

Group 5
P	Player	Hu	Baravok	Velaula	Pts
1	Hu Yi (CHN)	–	3–0	3–0	4
2	Katsiaryna Baravok (BLR)	0–3	–	3–0	3
3	Miljana Velaula (SRP)	0–3	0–3	–	2

Group 6
P	Player	Voronina	OliveraGomez	Ishchenko	Pts
1	Vlada Voronina (RUS)	–	3–1	3–0	4
2	Cristina Guadalupe Olivera Gomez (VEN)	1–3	–	3–0	3
3	Ekaterina Ishchenko (TJK)	0–3	0–3	–	2

Group 7
P	Player	Yarisi	BenitezGonzalez	Fukase	Pts
1	Fatemeh Yarisi (IRI)	–	3–0	3–0	4
2	Roxy Everlin Benitez Gonzalez (VEN)	0–3	–	3–1	3
3	Tamyres Tiemi Fukase (BRA)	0–3	1–3	–	2

Group 8
P	Player	Ismailova	Rahimi	Kokoeva	Pts
1	Dinara Ismailova (TJK)	–	3–1	3–0	4
2	Elana Rahimi (IRI)	1–3	–	3–0	3
3	Amanda Kokoeva (OSS)	0–3	0–3	–	2

Group 9
P	Player	Miashchanskaya	Asoyan	Mrden	Pts
1	Ulyana Miashchanskaya (BLR)	–	3–1	3–0	4
2	Valya Asoyan (ARM)	1–3	–	3–0	3
3	Jelena Mrden (SRP)	0–3	0–3	–	2

Group 10
P	Player	Baisya	Zaza	Gevorgyan	Pts
1	Poymantee Baisya (IND)	–	3–0	3–0	4
2	Hend Zaza (SYR)	0–3	–	3–0	3
3	Ellada Gevorgyan (ARM)	0–3	0–3	–	2

Group 11
P	Player	Xiaonan	Asgarova	Nurbekova	Pts
1	Wang Xiaonan (CHN)	–	3–0	3–0	4
2	Aylin Asgarova (AZE)	0–3	–	3–2	3
3	Nadima Nurbekova (TJK)	0–3	2–3	–	2

Group 12
P	Player	Obando	Nurmatova	Mohammed	Pts
1	Silva Camila Victoria Obando (VEN)	–	3–0	3–0	4
2	Marziya Nurmatova (AZE)	0–3	–	3–0	3
3	Kenda Mohammed (BHR)	0–3	0–3	–	2

Group 13
P	Player	Mikayilova	Alaali	Yutfa	Pts
1	Zemfira Mikayilova (AZE)	–	1–3	3–0	3
2	Maryam Alaali (BHR)	3–1	–	2–3	3
3	Lais Mika Yutfa (BRA)	0–3	3-2	–	3

Group 14
P	Player	Yan	Likhtarovich	Hambardzumyan	Pts
1	Yutong Yan (CHN)	–	3–0	3–0	4
2	Dziyana Likhtarovich (BLR)	0–3	–	3–1	3
3	Mariam Hambardzumyan (ARM)	0–3	1–3	–	2

Group 15
P	Player	Storlarski	Abdulhamidova	Alkhayyat	Pts
1	Lhays Francieli Storlarski (BRA)	–	3–0	3–0	4
2	Laman Abdulhamidova (AZE)	0–3	–	3–0	3
3	Dana Alkhayyat (BHR)	0–3	0–3	–	2

Group 16
P	Player	Sivasankar	Phadke	Panic	Pts
1	Yashini Sivasankar (IND)	–	3–0	3–0	4
2	Amruta Phadke (BHR)	0–3	–	3–1	3
3	Marija Panic (SRP)	0–3	1–3	–	2

==== Tournament bracket ====
Round of 32
Polina Mikhaylova (RUS)	11	11	11
Valya Asoyan (ARM)	2	5	5
Maryam Alaali (BHR)	5	11	6
Yutong Yan (CHN)	11	13	11
Lhays Francieli Leizviski Stolarski (BRA)	4	11	10
Xiaohui Ma (CHN)	11	13	12
Hend Zaza (SYR)	11	8	5	6
Fatemeh Yarisaraji (IRI)	9	11	11	11
Vlada Voronina (RUS)	11	11	11
Moumita Dutta (IND)	3	9	3
Elina Rahimi (IRI)	4	9	11	6
Xiaonan Wang (CHN)	11	11	8	11
Yashini Sivasankar (IND)	11	11	11
Marziyya Nurmatova (AZE)	8	6	5
Katsiaryna Baravok (BLR)	6	6	8
Elizabet Abraamian (RUS)	11	11	11
Mariya Tailakova (RUS)	11	11	11
Sara Shahsavari (IRI)	3	5	4
Amruta Phadke (BHR)	9	7	11	11	7
Ulyana Miashchanskaya (BLR)	11	11	4	6	11
Poymantee Baisya (IND)	8	11	11	11	11
Roxy Gonzalez Benitez (VEN)	11	9	13	4	7
Aylin Asgarova (AZE)	5	6	4
Dinara Ismailova (TJK)	11	11	11
Yi Hu (CHN)	11	12	11
Marija Gnjatic (SRP)	1	10	2
Dziyana Likhtarovich (BLR)	7	11	11	9	11
Camila Obando Silva (VEN)	11	9	8	11	8
Zemfira Mikayilova (AZE)	11	9	6	11	5
Cristina Gomez Olivera (VEN)	6	11	11	9	11
Laman Abdulhamidova (AZE)	13	2	1
Yana Noskova (RUS)	15	11	11

Round of 16
Mikhaylova (RUS)	11	11	11
Yan (CHN)	5	8	7
Ma (CHN)	9	7	11	9
Yarisaraji (IRI)	11	11	2	11
Voronina (RUS)	6	8	9
Wang (CHN)	11	11	11
Sivasankar (IND)	6	1	8
Abraamian (RUS)	11	11	11
Tailakova (RUS)	8	11	13	11
Miashchanskaya (BLR)	11	6	11	7
Baisya (IND)	12	11	11
Ismailova (TJK)	10	7	7
Hu (CHN)	11	11	11
Likhtarovich (BLR)	7	5	6
Gomez (VEN)	10	6	1
Noskova (RUS)	12	11	11

Quarterfinals
Mikhaylova (RUS)	11	5	8	11
Yarisaraji (IRI)	3	11	11	7
Wang (CHN)	3	11	5	8
Abraamian (RUS)	11	8	11	11
Tailakova (RUS)	11	11	11	11
Baisya (IND)	6	9	13	8
Hu (CHN)	5	4	11	7
Noskova (RUS)	11	11	9	11

Semifinals
Mikhaylova (RUS)	9	6	11	11	6
Abraamian (RUS)	11	11	9	8	11
Tailakova (RUS)	5	11	8	11	11
Noskova (RUS)	11	9	11	8	5

Final
Mariya Tailakova (RUS)	11	10	11	11
Elizabet Abraamian (RUS)	7	12	9	8

=== Men's team ===
==== Tournament bracket ====
Round of 16
Russia
Bye
Armenia	0
Bahrain	3
Tajikistan	3
Republika Srpska	1
Bye
Belarus
India	3
Abkhazia	0
Iran	3
Azerbaijan	0
Brazil	3
Afghanistan	0
Bye
China

Quarterfinals
Russia	3
Bahrain	0
Tajikistan	3
Belarus	1
India	2
Iran	3
Brazil	0
China	3

Semifinals
Russia	3
Belarus	0
Iran	1
China	3

Final
Russia	3
China	2

===== 5th to 8th classification round =====
Semifinals
Bahrain	3
Tajikistan	0
India	3
Brazil	0

5th place
India	3
Bahrain	1
7th place
Brazil	3
Tajikistan	1

===== 9th to 13th classification round =====
Quarterfinals
Bye
Armenia
Republika Srpska
Bye
Abkhazia	0
Azerbaijan	3
Afghanistan
Bye

Semifinals
Armenia	3
Republika Srpska	0
Azerbaijan	3
Afghanistan	0

9th place
Armenia	3
Azerbaijan	0
11th place
Republika Srpska	3
Afghanistan	0

==== Final standing ====
Rank	Team
1	Russia
2	China
3	Belarus
3	Iran
5	India
6	Bahrain
7	Brazil
8	Tajikistan
9	Armenia
10	Azerbaijan
11	Republika Srpska
12	Afghanistan
13	Abkhazia

=== Women's team ===
==== Tournament bracket ====
Round of 16
China
Bye
Republika Srpska	0
Azerbaijan	3
India	3
Bahrain	0
Bye
Belarus
Brazil	1
Iran	3
Venezuela	1
Bye
Armenia	1
Tajikistan	3
Bye
China

Quarterfinals
China	3
Azerbaijan	0
India	3
Belarus	0
Venezuela	0
Iran	3
Tajikistan	0
Russia	3

Semifinals
China	3
India	1
Iran	0
Russia	3

Final
China	0
Russia	3

===== 5th to 8th classification round =====
Semifinals
Azerbaijan	3
Belarus	0
Venezuela	3
Tajikistan	0

5th place
Belarus	3
Venezuela	1
7th place
Azerbaijan	3
Tajikistan	1

===== 9th to 12th classification round =====
Semifinals
Republika Srpska	1
Bahrain	3
Brazil	3
Armenia	0

9th place
Bahrain	1
Brazil	3
11th place
Republika Srpska	3
Armenia	0

==== Final standing ====
Rank	Team
1	Russia
2	China
3	India
3	Iran
5	Belarus
6	Venezuela
7	Azerbaijan
8	Tajikistan
9	Brazil
10	Bahrain
11	Republika Srpska
12	Armenia

== See also ==
- 2024 BRICS Games
