= Breaking at the 2024 BRICS Games =

Breaking event

- Venue: Dynamo Sports Palace
- Location: Moscow, Russia
- Dates: 22–23 June

Breakdancing at the 2024 BRICS Games in Moscow was held from 22 June to 23 June 2024.

== Medal summary ==
=== Medal table ===
* Host nation (Russia)

Rank	Nation	Gold	Silver	Bronze	Total
1	Russia (RUS)*	2	2	1	5
2	Brazil (BRA)	1	0	0	1
3	Italy (ITA)	0	1	0	1
3	Kazakhstan (KAZ)	0	1	0	1
5	Japan (JPN)	0	0	1	1
Totals (5 entries)		3	4	2	9

=== Medalists ===
The winners were as follows:

Event	Gold	Silver	Bronze
B-Boys	ZipRock; Russia	Snap; Italy	Grom; Russia
B-Girls	Toquinha; Brazil	Tata; Russia	Nika; Russia
4 x 4 Crew	Russia; Grom; ZipRock; Nord Diamond; Alkolil	Kazakhstan; Dias; Killa Kolya; Kalmius Vladimir; Shamil	Japan; GenRoc; Aito; Wato; Y-HI

== Schedule ==
Q	Qualifications	F	Finals

Event↓/Date →	22nd Sat	23th Sun
B-Boys	Q	F
B-Girls	Q	F
4 x 4 Crew	Q	F

== Officials ==
The judges for the competition were:

Name	Nationality
Kosto	Russia
Reveal	USA
Choco	Chinese Taipei
Astro	Macau
Kazuki ROC	Japan
Octopus	South Korea
Arex	Colombia
Froz	Italy
The Wolfer	Austria
G1	Thailand

The hosts and DJs for the competition were:

Name	Nationality	Role
MC Kazak	Russia	Host
DJ Vadim BW	Russia	DJ

== Participating nations ==
- Algeria
- Argentina
- Belarus
- Brazil
- Chile
- Colombia
- Ecuador
- France
- Germany
- Hong Kong
- India
- Indonesia
- Italy
- Japan
- Kazakhstan
- Malaysia
- Mexico
- Peru
- Portugal
- Russia
- South Korea
- Switzerland
- Chinese Taipei (As Team T.P.E)
- Thailand
- Togo
- Uzbekistan
- Venezuela
- Vietnam

== Event ==
The event is held along with Breaking Summer Fest. Some participants in BRICS Games are taking part in the event as well.

== Results ==
=== B-Boys ===
==== Preselection ====
Set #1	Set #2	Set #3	Set #4	Set #5	Set #6	Set #7	Set #8	Set #9
Foro (ECU)	Carlos Sucio (COL)	Ricky Rules (COL)	bboy ogong (KOR)	Tom (FRA)	Snake GA (THA)	Porteno (ARG)	Wizz Togo (TOG)	Sebon (CHI)
RickaZ (ALG)	Genroc (JPN)	Think (HKG)	Taower (TPE)	FlyingMachine (IND)	Bull Rock (UZB)	Button (AZE)	Ratoevn (BRA)	Silver Max (KAZ)
Legosam (MAS)	Volodya (BLR)	Dunk (KAZ)	Suriyadi (INA)	Wolf (BLR)	ZipRock (RUS)	Grom (RUS)	Snap (ITA)	Ben Dextop (THA)
B4 (VIE)	Jet leg (ITA)	Luan San (BRA)	M17 (GER)	Zaax (SUI)	Bruce Momentum (POR)	Mikki (SUI)	Farhan (INA)	XXL (POR)

==== Tournament Bracket ====
Round of 32	Round of 16	Quarterfinals	Semifinals
Jet leg (ITA)	9	8
Button (AZE)	0	1	Jet leg (ITA)	8	9
Ricky Rules (COL)	1	1	Ratoevn (BRA)	0	0
Ratoevn (BRA)	8	8	Jet leg (ITA)	5	4	5
Bruce Momentum (POR)	8	8	Bruce Momentum (POR)	3	5'	4
RickaZ (ALG)	1	1	SNAKE GA (THA)	1	0
SNAKE GA (THA)	8	8	Bruce Momentum (POR)	8	9
XXL (POR)	1	1	Genroc (JPN)	3	9	0
Genroc (JPN)	9	9	Jet Leg (ITA)	6	0	9
Dunk (KAZ)	0	0	Genroc (JPN)	8	8
Tom (FRA)	9	9	Tom (FRA)	1	1
Taower (TPE)	0	0	Genroc (JPN)	7	8
Legosam (MAS)	9	9	Legosam (MAS)	2	1
Mikki (SUI)	0	0	Legosam (MAS)	8	6	Final
Silver Max (KAZ)	2	7	3	Volodya (BLR)	1	3
Volodya (BLR)	7	2	6	Jet Leg (ITA)	1	2	1
Grom (RUS)	9	9	ZipRock (RUS)	8	7	8
Ben Dextop (THA)	0	0	Grom (RUS)	8	6
FlyingMachine (IND)	2	2	Wolf (BLR)	1	3
Wolf (BLR)	7	7	Grom (RUS)	7	8
M17 (GER)	9	9	Snap (ITA)	2	1
Zaax (SUI)	0	0	M17 (GER)	0	4
B4 (VIE)	0	0	Snap (ITA)	9	5
Snap (ITA)	9	9	Grom (RUS)	0	2
ZipRock (RUS)	8	9	ZipRock (RUS)	9	7
Bull Rock (UZB)	1	0	ZipRock (RUS)	8	8	Third place
Carlitos Sucio (COL)	5	8	Carlitos Sucio (COL)	1	1
Farhan (INA)	4	1	ZipRock (RUS)	6	8	Genroc (JPN)	3	7	2
Luan San (BRA)	9	9	Luan San (BRA)	3	1	Grom (RUS)	6	2	7
Porteno (ARG)	0	0	Luan San (BRA)	8	8
bboy ogong (KOR)	8	9	bboy ogong (KOR)	1	1
Think (HKG)	1	0

=== B-Girls ===
==== Preselection ====
Set #1	Set #2	Set #3	Set #4	Set #5	Set #6	Set #7
bgirl Steel 8 (KOR)	Lakshmi (ECU)	All Sky (VEN)	VIVY (THA)	Chris (UZB)	Nika (RUS)	Kotya (BLR)
Natural (ARG)	Lee (AZE)	Bar-B (IND)	Chicken Chicks (BLR)	Tiara (PER)	Nastya Momentum (POR)	Toquinha (BRA)
Mantra (COL)	All Sky (VEN)	Little (HKG)	Sayora (KAZ)	Lil Mami (CHI)	Tinie Rawk (VIE)	Valerial (POR)
Zoely-KDTS (MEX)	Ayu (JPN)	Dwi (INA)	Fran Killa (BRA)	Tata (RUS)	Cloudy (TPE)	

==== Tournament Bracket ====
Round of 16
Nika (RUS)	8	9
Dwi (INA)	1	0
Kotya (BLR)	4	6	3
Tinie Rawk (VIE)	5	3	6
Tata (RUS)	9	9
Bar-B (IND)	0	0
Ayu (JPN)	9	9
Lakshmi (ECU)	0	0
Toquinha (BRA)	7	6
Cloudy (TPE)	2	3
Nastya Momentum (POR)	6	6
Zoely-KDTS (MEX)	3	3
Sayora (KAZ)	9	9
Tiara (PER)	0	0
Mia (FRA)	9	9
Fran Killa (BRA)	0	0

Quarterfinals
Nika (RUS)	9	9
Tinie Rawk (VIE)	0	0
Tata (RUS)	7	8
Ayu (JPN)	2	1
Toquinha (BRA)	7	6
Nastya Momentum (POR)	2	3
Sayora (KAZ)	4	6	6
Mia (FRA)	5	3	3

Semifinals
Nika (RUS)	2	7	3
Tata (RUS)	7	2	6
Toquinha (BRA)	4	8	7
Sayora (KAZ)	5	1	2

Final
Tata (RUS)	3	5	3
Toquinha (BRA)	6	4	6
Small Final
Sayora (KAZ)	4	2	5
Nika (RUS)	5	7	4

=== 4 X 4 Crew ===
==== Preselection ====
Set #1	Set #2	Set #3	Set #4	Set #5	Set #6	Set #7	Set #8
Indonesia	Vietnam	India	Colombia	Belarus	Mexico	South Korea	Italy
(Chinese Taipei) Team T.P.E	Kazakhstan	Japan	Brazil	Thailand	Russia	Venezuela	Portugal

==== Tournament Bracket ====
Round of 16
Russia	4
Mexico	0
Venezuela	3
South Korea	2
Brazil	4
Colombia	0
Belarus	4
Indonesia	0
Thailand	0
Kazakhstan	4
India	3
Portugal	2
Japan	4
(Chinese Taipei) Team T.P.E	0
Italy	4
Vietnam	0

Quarterfinals
Russia	4
Venezuela	0
Brazil	3
Belarus	1
Kazakhstan	4
India	0
Japan	3
Italy	1

Semifinals
Russia	WO
Brazil
Kazakhstan	6
Japan	0

Final
Russia	6
Kazakhstan	2
Small Final
Brazil	4
Japan	5

== See also ==
- 2024 BRICS Games
