= University International Sports Festival =

Planned regional sports event in Russia

Международный фестиваль студенческого спорта University International Sports Festival
- Host city: Yekaterinburg, Sverdlovsk Oblast
- Country: Russia
- Teams: 36
- Athletes: 4100 (planned)
- Events: 197 in 14 Sports
- Opening: 19 August 2023
- Closing: 31 August 2023
- Website: ekat2023.com/en

University International Sports Festival (Russian: Международный фестиваль студенческого спорта, romanized: Mezhdunarodnyy festival' studencheskogo sporta) was a regional sports event held Yekaterinburg, Russia from 19 August 2023 to 31 August 2023. 4,000 athletes aged 17 to 23 from 22 countries contested for 197 medal events across 14 sports. The event is also one of the main events to celebrate the 300th anniversary of the founding of Yekaterinburg.

== Developments ==
The sports festival was established after the cancellation of the 2023 Summer World University Games and suspension of Russian and Belarusian athletes in the 2021 Summer World University Games due to the Russian invasion of Ukraine. Athletes from Russia and its ally Belarus were expected to participate in games, members of BRICS, SCO and CIS were also invited.

On 28 January 2023, the first information bulletin was published on the official website of the University International Sports Festival in English and Russian.

== Festival overview ==
- An estimated 4,100 athletes from 246 universities from 94 countries of the world, including 23 universities in Russia are included in the games, where athletes could not be younger than 17 years old and no older than 26 years old. The organizing committee will recruit roughly 6,000 volunteers, which the games is expected to attract 250,000 spectaculars.
- The organizing committee will use the sports venues and athlete village, originally planned to host the cancelled 2023 Summer World University Games, for the sports festival.

== Preparations ==
- In December 2022, nine months before the festival, Head of the Department of State Housing Construction Supervision of the Sverdlovsk Region Alexei Rossolov inspected the construction site of the water sports palace, community center and games village. When being asked about whether construction work was obstructed by international sanctions, Rossolov responded by saying that "western sanctions have always interfered and will interfere. But some [of the materials] were replenished thanks to import substitution, something was purchased in advance. We know what is changing for us."
- In January 2023, Russian Minister of sports Oleg Matytsin revealed that the sports festival would not be competed in the format of national teams but university teams instead, citing that it is to "remove all psychological barriers for our colleagues from European countries" to let them "able to come to Russia without looking back at someone's discontent." Furthermore, he also revealed that Latin American and African nations would be invited as well in the festival.
- On 28 January 2023, the first two dormitories of the students' village were put into operation.
- In April 2023, the first meeting of the Festival Organising Committee was held, where Russian Minister of Sport Oleg Matytsin, Deputy Minister of Finance Evgeny Kuyvashev and other officials attended the meeting.
- Starting from June 2023, tickets are open for sale, where interested parties could purchase them via "КАSSIR.RU", the official partner for ticket sales, through the official website of the festival.

== Safety measures ==
From August 15 till September, sale of alcohol and beverages were banned in the center of Yekaterinburg.

== Symbols of the games ==
=== Logo ===
On 1 February 2023, the logo for the University International Sports Festival is revealed. The basis of the logo are "EKAT", four multi-coloured letters that reflects the natural diversity of the host city, its forests and lakes, rivers and mountains, fields and plains. Meanwhile, straight lines used to feature the Ural constructivism.

=== Slogan ===
The slogan for the festivals is announced as "Yekaterinburg on Sports" following a public vote.

=== Theme song ===
The theme song "Boost of Energy, Positivity, and Drive" was announced in late May. The piece is written by Dmitry Filatov, conductor of the Ural Youth Symphony Orchestra and will be used in events in the festival.

=== Ambassador ===
On 19 April 2023, the committee announced that Anzhelika Timanina, Olympic and 11-time world champion in artistic swimming, will join as the sports ambassador of the festival.

On 11 May 2023, the committee announced that David Belyavskiy, 1-time Olympic and world champion in gymnastics becomes a festival ambassador.

Several other athletes were also announced as ambassadors of the festival.

== Official partners ==
- Ural Airlines - transportation partner
- Koltsovo International Airport - transportation service provider
- Ural Federal University - festival volunteer program operator

== Venues ==
The sports festival will be held in the following venues:

- Palace of Team Sports (Дворец игровых видов спорта)— volleyball, futsal
- Rhythmic Gymnastics Centre (Центр художественной и спортивной гимнастики)— rhythmic gymnastics
- Palace of Water Sports (Дворец водных видов спорта)— swimming, diving
- Judo Arena (Дворец дзюдо)— judo, sambo
- Ekaterinburg-Expo International Exhibition Centre (МВЦ «Екатеринбург-Экспо»)— table tennis, badminton, boxing, basketball 3x3, taekwondo, wrestling
- Greenwich Tennis Academy (Детская академия тенниса «Гринвич»)— tennis

== Schedule ==
https://ekat2023.com/en/schedule

== Events ==
The following 14 sports will be contested in the games, and 197 medals distributed:

- Badminton (6)
- 3x3 basketball (2)
- Boxing (25)
- Volleyball (2)
- Judo (16)
- Futsal (2)
- Table tennis (7)
- Swimming (42)
- Diving (9)
- Sambo (21)
- Wrestling (30)
- Tennis (5)
- Taekwondo (18)
- Rhythmic gymnastics (12)

== Participating nations ==
Members of the BRICS, SCO and CIS are invited to partake in the games. The following countries are chosen by the organizing committee initially. Later in March 2023, the Russian ambassador to China revealed that 94 countries are expected to compete at the Festival, but whether these countries are sending athletes to the games is still unconfirmed.

In April 2023, Deputy Prime Minister Dmitry Chernyshenko revealed to the press that 16 countries have expressed their readiness to take part in the festival, while the Russian ministry of sports has been working on inviting other countries to participate in the games. Meanwhile, the Russian sports minister Oleg Matytsin revealed that Russia has invited athletes from Benin, Senegal and Togo and various other countries to take part in the games to boost international cooperation in the field of physical culture and sports.

In July 2023, the first list of confirmed participating nations are announced. On 2 August 2023, the second batch of confirmed participating nations are announced. On 14 August 2023, 36 countries are confirmed to participate in the festival by the organizing committee.

1. Afghanistan (Note: The delegation used a flag depicting the University International Sports Festival logo.)
2. Argentina
3. Armenia
4. Azerbaijan
5. Bahrain
6. Bangladesh
7. Belarus
8. Brazil
9. China
10. Cuba
11. Ecuador
12. Guatemala
13. India
14. Indonesia
15. Iran
16. Iraq
17. Kazakhstan
18. Kyrgyzstan
19. Mexico
20. Mongolia
21. Nigeria
22. Pakistan
23. Russia (Host)
24. Serbia
25. South Ossetia
26. Sri Lanka
27. Syria
28. Tajikistan
29. Tanzania
30. Thailand
31. Turkey
32. Uganda
33. Uzbekistan
34. Venezuela
35. Vietnam
36. Zimbabwe

== Medal table ==
Medal table are as follows:

* Host nation (Russia)

University International Sports Festival Medal Table
Rank	Nation	Gold	Silver	Bronze	Total
1	Russia*	144	138	199	481
–	Other participating nations	51	56	104	211
Totals (1 entries)		195	194	303	692

== Official Broadcaster ==
Official broadcasters of the festival are listed as follows

- Worldwide:
  - University International Sports Festival official website
  - RTRS.Plus
  - YouTube and Rutube channels of Start TV and Radio Company
- Russia
  - START TV, Sportivny TV
  - Futbolny TV
  - Bolshoy efir TV channel

== See also ==
- CIS Games
- Games of the Future – in Kazan, Russia from 21 February to 3 March 2024.
- 2024 BRICS Games - in Kazan, Russia from 11 to 24 June 2024.
- 2024 World Friendship Games – in Moscow and Yekaterinburg, Russia from 15 to 29 September 2024.
- Intervision 2025
