= Badminton at the 2024 BRICS Games =

Badminton event

- Venue: Kazan Gymnastics Center
- Location: Kazan, Russia
- Dates: 13–16 June

Badminton events at the 2024 BRICS Games took place between 13 and 16 June at the Kazan Gymnastics Center in Kazan, Russia. The badminton program included men's and women's singles competitions; men's, women's and mixed doubles competitions.

This was the first time Russian and Belarusian badminton players have competed internationally since the ban of the two nations in 2022. This was also the first time badminton players from Mali competed internationally, even though the country is not affiliated with the Badminton World Federation.

Russia topped the medal table, sweeping gold and silver in all five disciplines. Belarus came second in the medal table with four bronze medals.

== Participating nations ==
A total of 35 badminton players from 7 National Olympic Committees (NOCs) across four continental confederations participated at the 2024 BRICS Games.

- Afghanistan (6)
- Belarus (4)
- Brazil (4)
- Burkina Faso (3)
- Mali (4)
- Russia (10)
- Syria (4)

== Medal summary ==
The table below gives an overview of the medal table and result of badminton at the 2024 BRICS Games:

=== Medal table ===
Rank	Nation	Gold	Silver	Bronze	Total
1	Russia (RUS)	5	5	2	12
2	Belarus (BLR)	0	0	4	4
3	Brazil (BRA)	0	0	3	3
4	Syria (SYR)	0	0	1	1
Totals (4 entries)		5	5	10	20

=== Medalists ===
Event	Gold	Silver	Bronze
Men's singles	Sergey Sirant; Russia	Artur Pechenkin; Russia	Welton Menezes; Brazil
Men's singles	Sergey Sirant; Russia	Artur Pechenkin; Russia	Vladislav Dobychkin; Russia
Women's singles	Evgeniya Kosetskaya; Russia	Mariia Golubeva; Russia	Sayane Regina Lima; Brazil
Women's singles	Evgeniya Kosetskaya; Russia	Mariia Golubeva; Russia	Sofiya Yanouskaya; Belarus
Men's doubles	Russia; Artur Pechenkin; Gleb Stepakov	Russia; Pavel Monich; Sergey Sirant	Syria; Hussam Aldin Rae; Shadi Alansari
Men's doubles	Russia; Artur Pechenkin; Gleb Stepakov	Russia; Pavel Monich; Sergey Sirant	Belarus; Mikhail Makarav; Hleb Shvydkov
Women's doubles	Russia; Alina Davletova; Evgeniya Kosetskaya	Russia; Daria Kharlampovich; Galina Lisochkina	Belarus; Maryna Yanbayeva; Sofiya Yanouskaya
Women's doubles	Russia; Alina Davletova; Evgeniya Kosetskaya	Russia; Daria Kharlampovich; Galina Lisochkina	Brazil; Sayane Regina Lima; Julia Viana Vieira
Mixed doubles	Russia; Gleb Stepakov; Alina Davletova	Russia; Vladislav Dobychkin; Mariia Golubeva	Belarus; Mikhail Makarav; Sofiya Yanouskaya
Mixed doubles	Russia; Gleb Stepakov; Alina Davletova	Russia; Vladislav Dobychkin; Mariia Golubeva	Russia; Pavel Monich; Daria Kharlampovich
