= Chess at the 2024 BRICS Games =

2024 chess tournament in Russia

- Venue: IT Park named after Bashir Rameev
- Location: Kazan , Russia
- Dates: 18–21 June

Chess at the 2024 BRICS Games in Kazan was held from 18 June to 21 June 2024.

== Medalists ==
Event	Gold	Silver	Bronze
Men’s Blitz	Andrey Esipenko (RUS)	Vladislav Artemiev (RUS)	Maksim Tsaruk (BLR)
Women’s Blitz	Kateryna Lagno (RUS)	Song Yuxin (CHN)	Guo Qi (CHN)
Men’s Rapid	Vladislav Artemiev (RUS)	Maksim Tsaruk (BLR)	Bai Jinshi (CHN)
Women’s Rapid	Kateryna Lagno (RUS)	Song Yuxin (CHN)	Valentina Gunina (RUS)
Blitz Team	Russia	China	Uzbekistan
Rapid Team	Russia	China	Uzbekistan

== Results ==
=== Men's Blitz ===
No.	Athlete	Rating	R1	R2	R3	R4	R5	R6	R7	R8	R9	R10	R11	Points	Tie-break 1	Tie-break 2	Tie-break 3
1st place, gold medalist(s)	Andrey Esipenko (RUS)	2624	1	1	0	1	1	1	1	½	1	½	1	9	74	69	8
2nd place, silver medalist(s)	Vladislav Artemiev (RUS)	2802	1	1	1	0	1	1	0	1	1	1	½	8.5	73.5	68.5	8
3rd place, bronze medalist(s)	Maksim Tsaruk (BLR)	2468	1	1	0	1	0	1	1	½	½	1	½	7.5	75	69.5	6
4	Aronyak Ghosh (IND)	2432	1	0	0	1	1	1	0	1	1	½	1	7.5	68	65	7
5	Xu Xiangyu (CHN)	2456	1	1	1	0	1	0	1	1	0	0	1	7	71	67	7
6	Abdimalik Abdisalimov (UZB)	2430	1	0	1	1	1	1	1	0	1	0	0	7	70	67	7
7	Bai Jinshi (CHN)	2551	1	0	1	1	0	1	0	1	0	1	1	7	70	65	7
8	Vishnu Prasanna V. (IND)	2457	1	1	1	1	0	0	1	0	½	1	0	6.5	75.5	70.5	6
9	Saidakbar Saydaliev (UZB)	2343	1	0	½	1	0	1	1	0	1	1	0	6.5	69.5	66.5	6
10	Félix Ynojosa (VEN)	2457	1	½	0	1	1	0	0	1	1	0	1	6.5	68.5	63.5	6
11	Amin Kabilov (TJK)	2110	0	1	1	0	0	1	1	0	0	1	1	6	63.5	60.5	6
12	Ruslan Sezdbekov (KGZ)	2065	0	1	½	0	0	1	1	½	0	1	1	6	56.5	53.5	5
13	Arthur Ssegwanyi (UGA)	2260	1	½	1	1	0	0	0	½	½	1	0	5.5	71	66.5	4
14	Lucas Aguiar Cunha (BRA)	2413	1	1	0	0	1	1	0	1	0	½	0	5.5	70	66	5
15	Abdulrahman Mohammad Al Taher (UAE)	2059	0	1	0	0	1	1	1	0	1	0	½	5.5	59	57	5
16	Maher Ayyad (BRN)	2133	0	1	1	0	1	0	1	0	½	½	½	5.5	58.5	55.5	4
17	Andrei Kodoev (OSS)	1613	0	0	0	1	0	1	½	1	0	1	1	5.5	44	42	5
18	Sedrani Ammar (UAE)	2243	0	1	1	0	1	0	0	1	0	0	1	5	60	57	5
19	Ryan Wesley Da Costa Caetano (BRA)	2240	0	0	1	0	1	1	1	1	0	0	0	5	58	56	5
20	Taalaib Imanaliev (KGZ)	2304	1	0	1	0	1	0	0	0	0	1	1	5	54.5	52.5	5
21	Yalemzewde Mekonnen Shiferaw (ETH)	1959	0	1	0	1	0	0	1	0	1	1	0	5	51	49	5
22	Haruna Nsubuga (UGA)	2049	0	1	0	1	1	0	0	1	½	0	0	4.5	60	55.5	4
23	Otari Khurkhumal (ABH)	1865	0	0	1	0	1	1	0	½	½	0	½	4.5	54.5	51.5	3
24	Ruslan Dzapshba (ABH)	1786	0	0	1	1	0	0	1	0	1	0	½	4.5	47	45	4
25	Leykun Mesfin (ETH)	2089	1	0	0	1	0	0	0	0	1	0	1	4	50.5	48.5	4
26	Charles Eichab (NAM)	2054	1	0	0	1	0	0	0	0	1	1	0	4	47.5	45.5	4
27	Weldu Gebru Lilay (ERI)	1977	0	1	0	0	0	0	0	1	0	0	1	3	50	48	3
28	Barthelemy Bongo Akanga Ndjila (GAB)	1861	0	0	0	0	0	0	1	1	1	0	0	3	48.5	46.5	3
29	Georgiy Shavlohov (OSS)	1873	0	0	1	0	0	1	½	½	0	0	0	3	48.5	46.5	2
30	Bernhard Schwarz (NAM)	1807	0	0	0	0	1	0	0	0	0	1	0	2	47.5	44.5	1

=== Women's Blitz ===
Rank	Rating	Player	R1	R2	R3	R4	R5	R6	R7	R8	R9	R10	R11	Points
1st place, gold medalist(s)	2476	Kateryna Lagno (RUS)	1	1	1	1	1	½	1	1	1	1	1	10.5
2nd place, silver medalist(s)	2232	Song Yuxin (CHN)	1	1	½	1	0	1	½	1	1	1	1	9
3rd place, bronze medalist(s)	2448	Guo Qi (CHN)	1	1	½	1	1	½	½	1	0	1	1	8.5
4	2429	Valentina Gunina (RUS)	1	1	1	0	0	1	1	1	0	1	½	7.5
5	2256	Umida Omonova (UZB)	1	0	1	0	1	1	½	0	1	1	½	7
6	2324	Mary Ann Gomes (IND)	1	0	1	0	1	1	0	1	1	0	1	7
7	2257	Padmini Rout (IND)	1	1	0	1	1	1	½	0	1	0	0	6.5
8	1971	Kseniya Zeliantsova (BLR)	1	1	0	1	0	0	1	1	0	1	0	6
9	1891	Begimai Zairbek Kyzy (KGZ)	0	1	0	1	0	1	0	1	1	0	1	6
10	1870	Annyd Gabriela Otazo Sanchez (VEN)	1	0	1	0	1	0	1	0	0	-	1	6
11	1911	Isabella Ribeiro Conti De Freitas (BRA)	0	1	1	0	1	0	0	0	1	1	1	6
12	1937	Nadezhda Antonova (TJK)	1	0	1	0	0	1	½	1	0	1	0	5.5
13	1949	Marjona Malikova (UZB)	0	1	1	0	0	1	½	1	0	0	-	5.5
14	1768	Diana Omurbekova (KGZ)	0	1	0	0	-	1	1	0	1	0	½	5.5
15	1738	Rashed Ahlam (UAE)	1	0	1	1	1	0	0	0	1	0	0	5
16	1806	Ola Mahmoud (SYR)	1	0	0	1	0	1	1	0	1	0	0	5
17	2077	Kathie Goulart Librelato (BRA)	0	1	0	1	1	0	0	0	1	1	0	5
18	1819	Ivy Claire Amoko (UGA)	0	0	1	0	1	0	-	1	0	0	1	5
19	2324	Mary Ann Gomes (IND)	0	0	0	1	0	-	1	0	0	1	1	5
20	1707	Moza Al Mansouri (UAE)	0	0	1	0	0	1	0	-	0	1	½	4.5
21	1561	Deia Amichba (ABH)	0	1	0	0	0	0	0	0	-	1	0	4
22	1508	Najla Ahmed (BRN)	0	-	0	0	1	0	1	1	0	0	0	4
23	0	Asya Aryutaa (ABH)	-	0	0	0	0	0	0	½	0	0	0	1.5

=== Men's Rapid ===
Rank	Athlete	Rtg	Round									Total	ARO
Rank	Athlete	Rtg	1	2	3	4	5	6	7	8	9	Total	ARO
1st place, gold medalist(s)	Vladislav Artemiev (RUS)	2747	1	½	1	1	½	1	1	1	½	7½	2527
2nd place, silver medalist(s)	Maksim Tsaruk (BLR)	2428	½	1	1	1	1	½	1	½	1	7½	2508
3rd place, bronze medalist(s)	Bai Jinshi (CHN)	2538	1	1	½	1	1	0	1	1	1	7½	2491
4	Felix Jose Ynojosa Aponte (VEN)	2384	½	1	0	1	½	1	1	1	1	5½	2422
5	Ruslan Sezdbekov (KGZ)	2185	1	0	1	½	1	1	0	1	½	5½	2340
6	Amin Kabilov (TJK)	2130	1	0	1	1	½	0	1	1	½	5½	2344
7	Andrey Esipenko (RUS)	2650	0	1	½	1	1	0	1	1	½	5½	2422
8	Abdimalik Abdisalimov (UZB)	2337	½	1	0	1	½	1	1	0	1	5½	2397
9	Ryan Wesley Da Costa Caetano (BRA)	2121	1	0	1	½	0	1	0	1	1	5	2322
10	Xu Xiangyu (CHN)	2614	0	½	1	½	0	1	½	0	1	4½	2356
11	Lucas Aguiar Cunha (BRA)	2357	0	1	0	1	½	0	1	½	1	4½	2330
12	Taalaibek Imanaliev (KGZ)	2178	½	0	1	0	1	½	0	1	1	4½	2358
13	Aronyak Ghosh (IND)	2426	0	½	1	0	½	1	0	1	1	4½	2310
14	Sedrani Ammar (UAE)	2202	0	1	0	½	1	0	1	0	1	4½	2310
15	Maher Ayyad (BRN)	1982	0	½	0	1	0	1	½	1	0	4	2188
16	Vishnu Prasanna (IND)	2446	0	1	0	½	0	1	½	0	1	4	2301
17	Haruna Nsubuga (UGA)	2179	0	0	½	0	1	0	1	1	1	4	2263
18	Abdulrahman Mohammad Al Taher (UAE)	2131	0	½	0	1	0	0	1	1	1	4	2248
19	Saidakbar Saydaliev (UZB)	2335	0	0	½	0	1	0	1	0	1	3½	2317
20	Arthur Ssegwanyi (UGA)	2173	0	½	0	0	1	0	1	0	1	3½	2240
21	Andrei Kodoev (OSS)	1596	0	0	½	0	1	0	1	0	1	3½	2222
22	Barthelemy Bongo Akanga Ndjila (GAB)	1932	0	0	0	0	1	0	1	0	1	3½	2123
23	Georgiy Shavlohov (OSS)	1927	0	0	0	0	0	0	1	0	1	3½	2106
24	Otari Khurkhumal (ABH)	1803	0	0	0	0	½	0	1	0	1	3½	2092
25	Weldu Gebru Lilay (ERI)	1977	0	0	0	0	0	0	1	½	½	2	2089
26	Ruslan Dzapshba (ABH)	1811	0	0	0	0	0	0	0	½	½	½	2007

=== Women's Rapid ===
Rank	Athlete	Rating	Round									Total	ARO
Rank	Athlete	Rating	1	2	3	4	5	6	7	8	9	Total	ARO
1st place, gold medalist(s)	Kateryna Lagno (RUS)	2476	1	½	1	1	1	1	½	1	1	7½	2523
2nd place, silver medalist(s)	Song Yuxin (CHN)	2232	½	1	0	1	½	1	1	½	1	6½	2455
3rd place, bronze medalist(s)	Valentina Gunina (RUS)	2429	1	0	1	0	1	1	1	½	1	6½	2445
4	Guo Qi (CHN)	2448	1	1	½	½	½	1	0	½	1	6	2465
5	Umida Omonova (UZB)	2256	1	1	0	1	½	1	0	1	0	5½	2450
6	Mary Ann Gomes (IND)	2324	1	1	1	½	0	0	1	1	0	5½	2430
7	Kathie Goulart Librelato (BRA)	2077	0	1	1	1	0	1	0	½	1	5½	2410
8	Kseniya Zeliantsova (BLR)	1971	1	0	1	1	1	0	0	0	1	5	2395
9	Marjona Malikova (UZB)	1949	1	1	0	0	1	0	0	1	1	5	2385
10	Rout Padmini (IND)	2257	1	1	½	½	½	0	1	½	0	5	2375
11	Isabella Ribeiro Conti De Freitas (BRA)	1911	0	1	1	0	1	0	0	1	-	5	2360
12	Shakira Ampaire (UGA)	1763	0	0	1	1	½	½	0	1	1	5	2325
13	Annyd Gabriela Otazo Sanchez (VEN)	1870	0	0	1	1	0	1	1	½	0	4½	2300
14	Nadezhda Antonova (TJK)	1937	0	½	½	1	½	0	0	-	1	4½	2290
15	Diana Omurbekova (KGZ)	1768	0	½	0	-	-	-	-	-	-	4½	2275
16	Begimai Zairbek Kyzy (KGZ)	1891	0	0	1	0	1	0	0	1	1	4	2250
17	Ivy ClaireAmoko (UGA)	1819	0	0	0	1	0	1	0	1	1	4	2240
18	Rashed Ahlam (UAE)	1738	0	½	0	0	1	0	1	1	1	4	2225
19	Moza Al Mansouri (UAE)	1707	0	0	½	0	1	0	1	1	1	3½	2210
20	Deia Amichba (ABH)	1561	0	0	0	½	1	0	1	1	1	3½	2185
21	Ola Mahmoud (SYR)	1806	0	0	0	0	½	0	1	1	1	3	2165
22	Najla Ahmed (BRN)	1508	0	0	0	0	0	1	1	1	1	3	2150
23	Asya Aryutaa (ABH)	0	0	0	0	0	0	0	1	½	1½	2100	

=== Blitz Team ===
Rk.	SNo	Team	Games	+	=	-	TB1	TB2	TB3
1st place, gold medalist(s)	1	Russia	11	10	1	0	21	40.5	0
2nd place, silver medalist(s)	2	China	11	9	2	0	20	35.5	0
3rd place, bronze medalist(s)	4	Uzbekistan	11	9	2	0	18	32.5	0
4	3	India	11	8	3	0	16	30.5	0
5	6	Belarus	11	6	4	1	13	24	0
6	9	Uganda	11	5	2	4	12	23	0
7	8	Tajikistan	11	5	2	4	12	23	0
8	7	Kyrgyzstan	11	5	1	5	11	25.5	0
9	5	Brazil	11	5	1	5	11	21	0
10	11	United Arab Emirates	11	5	0	6	10	22.5	0
11	10	Venezuela	11	4	2	5	10	17	0
12	12	Ethiopia	11	4	1	6	9	19	0
13	14	Abkhazia	11	2	1	8	5	12.5	0
14	13	Namibia	11	2	1	8	5	10.5	0
15	15	Bahrain	11	1	1	9	3	9	0
16	16	South Ossetia	11	0	0	11	0	4	0

=== Team Rapid ===
Rk.	SNo	Team	Games	+	=	-	TB1	TB2	TB3	TB4
1st place, gold medalist(s)	1	Russia	9	8	1	0	17	30	0	99
2nd place, silver medalist(s)	2	China	9	7	2	0	16	30	0	99
3rd place, bronze medalist(s)	4	Uzbekistan	9	6	2	1	14	24.5	0	100
4	3	India	9	6	1	2	13	27.5	0	100
5	5	Belarus	9	5	0	4	10	23	0	88
6	9	Kyrgyzstan	9	5	0	4	10	20	0	75
7	6	Brazil	9	5	0	4	10	18	0	88
8	7	Tajikistan	9	4	1	4	9	20.5	0	77
9	8	Uganda	9	4	1	4	9	16.5	0	91
10	10	United Arab Emirates	9	4	0	5	8	16.5	0	79
11	12	Ethiopia	9	4	0	5	8	14	0	75
12	11	Venezuela	9	4	0	5	8	12.5	0	74
13	14	Abkhazia	9	2	1	6	5	10	0	62
14	16	Bahrain	9	0	3	6	3	7.5	0	63
15	13	Namibia	9	1	1	7	3	6.5	0	63
16	15	South Ossetia	9	0	1	8	1	6	0	63

== See also ==
- 2024 BRICS Games
