= Boxing at the 2024 BRICS Games =

Boxing event

- Venue: Boxing and Table Tennis Centre
- Location: Kazan, Russia
- Dates: 19–22 June

Boxing at the 2024 BRICS Games in Kazan was held from 19 June to 22 June 2024.

== Medalists ==
Event	Gold	Silver	Bronze
Men
48 kg	Mnacakanyan Volodya (RUS)	Melikuziev Shodiyorjon (UZB)	Sariev Tural (AZE) Amankul uulu Asyilbek (KGZ)
51 kg	Batlaev Bair (RUS)	Ergeshov Bekzat (KGZ)	Jalilov Asilbek (UZB) Cova Andras (VEN)
54 kg	Kuznecov Maksim (RUS)	Muzafarov Shakhzod (UZB)	Solockih Denis (BLR) Kachkinbekov Adilet (KGZ)
57 kg	Peglivanyan Andrey (RUS)	Fayzov Khudoynazar (UZB)	Pankov Maksim (BLR) Saidakmatov Sanzhai (KGZ)
60 kg	Ardzhenia German (ABH)	Abdumurodov Dilshod (UZB)	Mohamed Aljneibi (UAE) Tovmasyan Arshak (RUS)
63.5 kg	Popov Ilya (RUS)	Volchek Vadim (BLR)	Mukhiddinov Adkhamjon (UZB) Yibulayimu Mamuti (CHN)
67 kg	Solovyov Karen (RUS)	Boltaev Shavkatjon (UZB)	Isgandarov Nabi (AZE) Gagiev Guram (OSS)
71 kg	Asadullaev Khavasbek (UZB)	Koldenkov Sergey (RUS)	Abdyzhapar uulu Syrgak (KGZ) Yeerdawuliy Mayilanbieke (CHN)
75 kg	Sergeev Sergey (RUS)	Ummataliev Javokhir (UZB)	Turgunov Islombek (KGZ) Kazimzade Mirsharif (AZE)
80 kg	Shavlaev Beshto (RUS)	Khabibullaev Turabek (UZB)	Halimulati Rehemandu (CHN) Koktikov Aleksey (BLR)
86 kg	Scheblykin Vadim (RUS)	Seyidov Seyid (AZE)	Dursunov Muhammed (KGZ) Abdullaev Shokhjakhon (UZB)
92 kg	Saydrakhimov Madiyar (UZB)	Hanapiev Ramazan (RUS)	Karimov Parviz (TJK) Khuseynli Vatan (AZE)
92+ kg	Bakhodir Jalolov (UZB)	Smyaglikov Vladislav (BLR)	Dzhioev Arsen (OSS) David Surov (RUS)
Women
48 kg	Minakshi (IND)	Zhavaher Abdulla (UAE)	Patlay Lia (RUS) Fomina Milana (BLR)
50 kg	Anamika (IND)	Thaddwethu Mathiba (RSA)	Galieva Gelyusa (RUS) Burim Yana (BLR)
52 kg	Aedma Anna (RUS)	Jyoti (IND)	Thandoenkozi Aneliswa Ncube (RSA) Kazakova Feruza (UZB)
54 kg	Samohina Natalya (RUS)	Trushkina Tatyana (BLR)	Sonia (IND) Beata Arshba (ABH)
57 kg	Voroncova Lyudmila (RUS)	Turdibekova Sitora (UZB)	Sakshi (IND) Mulyarchik Marina (BLR)
60 kg	Golubeva Nadezhda (RUS)	Manisha (IND)	Ivashkevich Alla (BLR) Ayi Guzaili Maihesuti (CHN)
63 kg	Pushkar Alina (RUS)	Wangjinwen (CHN)	Prachi (IND) Bekova Dilfuza (UZB)
66 kg	Amineva Azalia (RUS)	Ailidana Abdularihit (CHN)	Manju Bamboriya (IND) Rahmah Almurshadi (UAE)
70 kg	Shu Li (CHN)	Kotlyarova Lyudmila (RUS)	Lalita (IND) Movlonova Mavluda (UZB)
75 kg	Gapeshina Elena (RUS)	Zokirova Aziza (UZB)	Pooja Rani (IND) Guevara Keidy (VEN)
81 kg	Medenova Saltanat (RUS)	Zheng Lu (CHN)	Kebikova Viktoria (BLR) Sotimboeva Oltinoy (UZB)
81+ kg	Olifrienko Ksenia (RUS)	Yilian Zhan (CHN)	Nupur (IND) Kuigenbaeva Lazzat (KAZ)

== Results ==
=== Men's events ===
==== 48 kg ====
Semifinals
Sariev Tural (AZE)	5
Mnacakanyan Volodya (RUS)	0
Melikuziev Shodiyorjon (UZB)	5
Amankul uulu Asyilbek (KGZ)	0

Final
Sariev Tural (AZE)	5
Melikuziev Shodiyorjon (UZB)	0

==== 51 kg ====
Quarterfinals
Batlaev Bair (RUS)	5
Yusifazada Masud (AZE)	0
Jalilov Asilbek (UZB)	5
Lubabalo Lusizi (RSA)	0

Semifinals
Batlaev Bair (RUS)	5
Jalilov Asilbek (UZB)	0
Cova Andras (VEN)	4
Ergeshov Bekzat (KGZ)	1

Final
Batlaev Bair (RUS)	5
Ergeshov Bekzat (KGZ)	0

==== 54 kg ====
Quarterfinals
Kuznecov Maksim (RUS)	5
Mamadzada Amin (AZE)	0
Solockih Denis (BLR)	5
Mohamad Ali (SYR)	0

Semifinals
Kuznecov Maksim (RUS)	4
Solockih Denis (BLR)	1
Muzafarov Shakhzod (UZB)	5
Kachkinbekov Adilet (KGZ)	0

Final
Kuznecov Maksim (RUS)	4
' Muzafarov Shakhzod (UZB)	1

==== 57 kg ====
Quarterfinals
Pankov Maksim (BLR)	5
Rustamov Umid (AZE)	0
Saidakmatov Sanzhai (KGZ)	3
Solarte Mauwel (VEN)	2
Peglivanyan Andrey (RUS)	5
Joukhdar Belal (SYR)	0

Semifinals
Fayzov Khudoynazar (UZB)	5
Pankov Maksim (BLR)	0
Peglivanyan Andrey (RUS)	5
Saidakmatov Sanzhai (KGZ)	0

Final
Peglivanyan Andrey (RUS)	5
Fayzov Khudoynazar (UZB)	0

==== 60 kg ====
Round of 16
Abdumurodov Dilshod (UZB)	5
Imankadirov Turgunbek (KGZ)	0

Quarterfinals
Mohamed Aljneibi (UAE)	RSC2
Kokoev Aslanbeg (OSS)
Ardzhenia German (ABH)	5
Smolovskii Vladislav (BLR)	0
Tovmasyan Arshak (RUS)	RSC2
Sanele Socgvwayi (RSA)
Abdumurodov Dilshod (UZB)	5
Khasmetov Maksud (AZE)	0

Semifinals
Mohamed Aljneibi (UAE)	0
Ardzhenia German (ABH)	5
Tovmasyan Arshak (RUS)	0
Abdumurodov Dilshod (UZB)	5

Final
Ardzhenia German (ABH)	5
Abdumurodov Dilshod (UZB)	0

==== 63,5 kg ====
Round of 16
Volchek Vadim (BLR)	5
Hamos Kuchi (AFG)	0
Masamba John (RSA)	0
Yibulayimu Mamuti (CHN)	5
Dzhanba Nestor (ABH)	5
Bachaev Dmitriy (OSS)	0

Quarterfinals
Popov Ilya (RUS)	5
Rustamov Rustam (AZE)	0
Mukhiddinov Adkhamjon (UZB)	5
Imamnazarov Mirzohid (KGZ)	0
Badr Almaazmi (UAE)	0
Volchek Vadim (BLR)	5
Yibulayimu Mamuti (CHN)	5
Dzhanba Nestor (ABH)	0

Semifinals
Popov Ilya (RUS)	5
Mukhiddinov Adkhamjon (UZB)	0
Volchek Vadim (BLR)	5
Yibulayimu Mamuti (CHN)	0

Final
Popov Ilya (RUS)	5
Volchek Vadim (BLR)	0

==== 67 kg ====
Round of 16
Haidara Alasaly (SYR)	0
Solovyov Karen (RUS)	5
Orozbekov Almaz (KGZ)	2
Isgandarov Nabi (AZE)	3
Siphamandla Danesi (RSA)	5
Titko Daniil (BLR)	0

Quarterfinals
Solovyov Karen (RUS)	5
Musitafa Muhetaer (CHN)	0
Isgandarov Nabi (AZE)	5
Siphamandla Danesi (RSA)	0
Kacharava Sair (ABH)	0
Boltaev Shavkatjon (UZB)	5
Amer Alsuwaider (UAE)	0
Gagiev Guram (OSS)	5

Semifinals
Solovyov Karen (RUS)	5
Isgandarov Nabi (AZE)	0
Boltaev Shavkatjon (UZB)	KO1r
Gagiev Guram (OSS)

Final
Solovyov Karen (RUS)	5
Boltaev Shavkatjon (UZB)	0

==== 71 kg ====
Round of 16
Asadullaev Khavasbek (UZB)	5
Amiri Farazahmad (AFG)	0

Quarterfinals
Asadullaev Khavasbek (UZB)	5
Adleyba Igor (ABH)	0
Abdyzhapar uulu Syrgak (KGZ)	5
Chalabiyev Javid (AZE)	0
Koldenkov Sergey (RUS)	RSC1r
Abdallah Ayyash (UAE)
Uuyo Anjelo Mnguni (RSA)	0
Yeerdawuliy Mayilanbieke (CHN)	5

Semifinals
Asadullaev Khavasbek (UZB)	5
Abdyzhapar uulu Syrgak (KGZ)	0
Koldenkov Sergey (RUS)	5
Yeerdawuliy Mayilanbieke (CHN)	0

Final
Asadullaev Khavasbek (UZB)	3
Koldenkov Sergey (RUS)	2

==== 75 kg ====
Quarterfinals
Ubayrula Mahammad Zoda (AFG)	0
Kazimzade Mirsharif (AZE)	5
Jalilov Asilbek (TJK)	0
Ummataliev Javokhir (UZB)	5

Semifinals
Sergeev Sergey (RUS)	5
Turgunov Islombek (KGZ)	0
Kazimzade Mirsharif (AZE)	5
Ummataliev Javokhir (UZB)	0

Final
Sergeev Sergey (RUS)	5
Ummataliev Javokhir (UZB)	0

==== 80 kg ====
Round of 16
Khaddam Odai (SYR)	5
Elssa Alkurd (UAE)	0
Satibaldi uulu Sagin (KGZ)	2
Halimulati Rehemandu (CHN)	3

Quarterfinals
Khaddam Odai (SYR)
Halimulati Rehemandu (CHN)	RSC3r
Lara Evans Netshidamboni (RSA)	0
Khabibullaev Turabek (UZB)	5
Mamadov Fagan (AZE)	0
Shavlaev Beshto (RUS)	RSC2r
Chezhia Batal (ABH)	0
Koktikov Aleksey (BLR)	5

Semifinals
Halimulati Rehemandu (CHN)	0
Khabibullaev Turabek (UZB)	5
Shavlaev Beshto (RUS)	5
Koktikov Aleksey (BLR)	0

Final
Khabibullaev Turabek (UZB)	0
Shavlaev Beshto (RUS)	5

==== 86 kg ====
Semifinals
Dursunov Muhammed (KGZ)	0
Seyidov Seyid (AZE)	5
Abdullaev Shokhjakhon (UZB)	0
Scheblykin Vadim (RUS)	KO2r

Final
Seyidov Seyid (AZE)	0
Scheblykin Vadim (RUS)	5

==== 92 kg ====
Quarterfinals
Karimov Parviz (TJK)	5
Aizihaier Tuo Hong Daji (CHN)	0
Khuseynli Vatan (AZE)	5
Rahimi Adul-Bassid (AFG)	0
Saydrakhimov Madiyar (UZB)	5
Toktosun uulu Bakit (KGZ)	0

Semifinals
Hanapiev Ramazan (RUS)	5
Karimov Parviz (TJK)	0
Khuseynli Vatan (AZE)	0
Saydrakhimov Madiyar (UZB)	5

Final
Hanapiev Ramazan (RUS)	0
Saydrakhimov Madiyar (UZB)	5

==== 92+ kg ====
Quarterfinals
Dzhioev Arsen (OSS)	KO1r
Saipov Sarvarbek (KGZ)	0
Nuriev Johanes (AZE)	0
David Surov (RUS)	5
Abudurixiti Remula (CHN)	0
Bakhodir Jalolov (UZB)	5

Semifinals
Smyaglikov Vladislav (BLR)	5
Dzhioev Arsen (OSS)	0
David Surov (RUS)	0
Bakhodir Jalolov (UZB)	5

Final
Smyaglikov Vladislav (BLR)
Bakhodir Jalolov (UZB)	ABD3r

=== Women's ===
==== 48 kg ====
Quarterfinals
Patlay Lia (RUS)	5
Rakhomonova Saidakhon (UZB)	0

Semifinals
Zhavaher Abdulla (UAE)	5
Fomina Milana (BLR)	0
Minakshi (IND)	5
Patlay Lia (RUS)	0

Final
Zhavaher Abdulla (UAE)
Minakshi (IND)	RSC 1r

==== 50 kg ====
Quarterfinals
Anamika (IND)	5
Bobokulova Sabina (UZB)	0

Semifinals
Burim Yana (BLR)	0
Thaddwethu Mathiba (RSA)	5
Galieva Gelyusa (RUS)	0
Anamika (IND)	5

Final
Thaddwethu Mathiba (RSA)	0
Anamika (IND)	5

==== 52 kg ====
Quarterfinals
Aedma Anna (RUS)	4
Apanasovich Ulia (BLR)	1

Semifinals
Thandoenkozi Aneliswa Ncube (RSA)
Jyoti (IND)	RSC2r
Kazakova Feruza (UZB)	1
Aedma Anna (RUS)	4

Final
Aedma Anna (RUS)	4
Jyoti (IND)	1

==== 54 kg ====
Quarterfinals
Sonia (IND)	5
Uktamova Nigina (UZB)	0
Cwenda Qasana (RSA)	0
Samohina Natalya (RUS)	4

Semifinals
Trushkina Tatyana (BLR)	5
Beata Arshba (ABH)	0
Sonia (IND)	0
Samohina Natalya (RUS)	4

Final
Trushkina Tatyana (BLR)	0
Samohina Natalya (RUS)	5

==== 57 kg ====
Semifinals
Turdibekova Sitora (UZB)	5
Sakshi (IND)	0
Mulyarchik Marina (BLR)	0
Voroncova Lyudmila (RUS)	5

Final
Turdibekova Sitora (UZB)	0
Voroncova Lyudmila (RUS)	5

==== 60 kg ====
Quarterfinals
Ivashkevich Alla (BLR)	5
Tagirova Rashida (UZB)	0
Volosenko Rimma (KAZ)	0
Golubeva Nadezhda (RUS)	5
Rios Ojeda Krisandi (VEN)	RSC3r
Misa Austar Rikhotso (RSA)	0
Ayi Guzaili Maihesuti (CHN)	5
Manisha (IND)	0

Semifinals
Ivashkevich Alla (BLR)	0
Golubeva Nadezhda (RUS)	5
Manisha (IND)	5
Ayi Guzaili Maihesuti (CHN)	0

Final
Golubeva Nadezhda (RUS)	5
Manisha (IND)	0

==== 63 kg ====
Semifinals
Pushkar Alina (RUS)	5
Prachi (IND)	0
Wangjinwen (CHN)	5
Bekova Dilfuza (UZB)	0

Final
Pushkar Alina (RUS)	5
Wangjinwen (CHN)	0

==== 66 kg ====
Quarterfinals
Abdullaeva Khadichabonu (UZB)	0
Manju Bamboriya (IND)	5
Lecko Dariya (BLR)	0
Amineva Azalia (RUS)	5

Semifinals
Ailidana Abdularihit (CHN)	5
Rahmah Almurshadi (UAE)	0
Manju Bamboriya (IND)	0
Amineva Azalia (RUS)	5

Final
Ailidana Abdularihit (CHN)	0
Amineva Azalia (RUS)	5

==== 70 kg ====
Quarterfinals
Danilchik Arina (BLR)	0
Kotlyarova Lyudmila (RUS)	5

Semifinals
Lalita (IND)	0
Shu Li (CHN)	5
Movlonova Mavluda (UZB)	0
Kotlyarova Lyudmila (RUS)	5

Final
Shu Li (CHN)	5
' Kotlyarova Lyudmila (RUS)	0

==== 75 kg ====
Quarterfinals
Veber Alina (BLR)	0
Zokirova Aziza (UZB)	5

Semifinals
Pooja Rani (IND)	0
Gapeshina Elena (RUS)	5
Guevara Keidy (VEN)	0
Zokirova Aziza (UZB)	5

Final
Gapeshina Elena (RUS)	5
Zokirova Aziza (UZB)	0

==== 81 kg ====
Quarterfinals
Zheng Lu (CHN)	5
Saweety (IND)	0

Semifinals
Medenova Saltanat (RUS)	5
Kebikova Viktoria (BLR)	0
Sotimboeva Oltinoy (UZB)
Zheng Lu (CHN)	RSC2r

Final
Medenova Saltanat (RUS)	5
Zheng Lu (CHN)	0

==== 81+ kg ====
Quarterfinals
Nupur (IND)	5
Abdumannobova Diyorakhon (UZB)	0

Semifinals
Yilian Zhan (CHN)	5
Kuigenbaeva Lazzat (KAZ)	0
Olifrienko Ksenia (RUS)	3
Nupur (IND)	2

Final
Yilian Zhan (CHN)	0
Olifrienko Ksenia (RUS)	5

== See also ==
- 2024 BRICS Games
