= Mohammad Mousavi (table tennis) =

Iranian table tennis player (born 2003)

Personal information
- Full name: Seyed Mohammad Mousavi Taher
- Born: 22 February 2003 (age 23) Babol, Iran
- Height: 1.79 m (5 ft 10 in)
- Weight: 70 kg (154 lb)

Sport
- Sport: Table tennis
- Playing style: Right-handed
Medal record
Men's table tennis
Representing Iran
Event	1st	2nd	3rd
Islamic Solidarity Games	0	1	0
Total	0	1	0

Mohammad Mousavi (born 21 February 2003 in Babol) is an Iranian table tennis player who plays for the Iran national table tennis team and Petroshimi Bandar Imam club.

Mousavi won a silver medal for Iran in the team event at the 2025 Islamic Solidarity Games.

Mousavi faced France’s Bertrand Erwin, ranked 158th in the world, in the final of the 2025 Germany Challenge Cup. He lost a closely contested match 3–2 and won the silver medal.

== Medal Result ==
- Team bronze medal at the 2024 BRICS Games in Russia.
