= Koresh at the 2024 BRICS Games =

Wrestling event

- Venue: Ak Bars Martial Arts Palace
- Location: Kazan, Russia
- Dates: 20–21 June

Koresh at the 2024 BRICS Games in Kazan was held from 20 June to 21 June 2024.

== Medal Summary ==
=== Medal table ===
* Host nation (Russia)

Rank	Nation	Gold	Silver	Bronze	Total
1	Russia (RUS)*	10	0	0	10
2	Uzbekistan (UZB)	0	2	5	7
3	Azerbaijan (AZE)	0	2	3	5
3	Kyrgyzstan (KGZ)	0	2	3	5
5	Iran (IRI)	0	2	0	2
6	Tajikistan (TJK)	0	1	6	7
7	Kazakhstan (KAZ)	0	1	0	1
8	Armenia (ARM)	0	0	1	1
8	Belarus (BLR)	0	0	1	1
8	Mongolia (MGL)	0	0	1	1
Totals (10 entries)		10	10	20	40

=== Medalists ===
Event	Gold	Silver	Bronze
60 kg	Aleksey Abramov (RUS)	Ariz Huseynov (AZE)	Nodirbek Abdumalikov (UZB) Narek Safaryan (ARM)
65 kg	Artur Khakimov (RUS)	Doniyor Abdurakhmonov (UZB)	Drlen Estebesov (KGZ) Odinamahmad Ziyoev (TJK)
70 kg	Islam Falyakhov (RUS)	Azizjon Azimjonov (UZB)	Muhammadsalmon Qurbonov (TJK) Jasur Mehtiyev (AZE)
75 kg	Dinar Karimullin (RUS)	Khabibullo Tynchtyk Uulu (KGZ)	Rajabzoda Khudoyor (TJK) Nusratbek Sultonboev (UZB)
80 kg	Artur Zulkarnaev (RUS)	Haciyev Mehdi (AZE)	Erbol Turapbaev (KGZ) Khatanbold Khurelbaatar (MGL)
85 kg	Ranis Galimullin (RUS)	Adilet Zhahgbyrshy (KAZ)	Anvar Muratbek Uulu (KGZ) Ilkhomjon Mashrabov (UZB)
90 kg	Azat Gabdrashitov (RUS)	Uounes Pahlavanzadeh (IRI)	Ivan Dubina (BLR) Sarif Abdullah (AZE)
100 kg	Ruslan Rafikov (RUS)	Baiaman Myktybekov (KGZ)	Dilshod Qurbonov (TJK) Zaylobiddin Artikov (UZB)
130 kg	Radik Salakhov (RUS)	Azimjon Homidov (TJK)	Firdavs Faizulloev (TJK) Ilyosbek Mirzakhmatov (UZB)
130+ kg	Ranis Gilyazetdinov (RUS)	Azimi Shadman (IRI)	Abdusalom Salomov (TJK) Khislat Pirmatov (UZB)

== Participating Nations ==
- Armenia (2)
- Azerbaijan (10)
- Bangladesh (1)
- Belarus (3)
- Egypt (1)
- Iran (4)
- Iraq (1)
- Israel (2)
- Jordan (1)
- Kazakhstan (2)
- Kyrgyzstan (9)
- Lebanon (1)
- Mongolia (5)
- Palestine (1)
- Russia (10)
- Senegal (1)
- Tajikistan (9)
- Turkey (2)
- Uzbekistan (10)

=== Registered but Did Not Compete ===
The following nations were listed in the entries but did not participate:

- Lithuania
- Romania
- Chad
- Tunisia
- Abkhazia
- South Ossetia

== Results ==
=== 60 kg ===
Qualification
Krasinski M. (BLR)	5
Moukhtar M. (CHA)	0
Hakobyan N. (ARM)	0
Abramov A. (RUS)	5

Quarterfinals
Ariz Azad H. (AZE)	5
Krasinski M. (BLR)	0
Alymbekov S. (KGZ)	0
Abdumalikov N. (UZB)	5
Erdenesuren U. (MGL)	5
Mamadkhujaev A. (TJK)	0
Abramov A. (RUS)	5
Bayantur G. (MGL)	0

Semifinals
Ariz Azad H. (AZE)	5
Abdumalikov N. (UZB)	0
Erdenesuren U. (MGL)	0
Abramov A. (RUS)	5

Final
Ariz Azad H. (AZE)	0
Abramov A. (RUS)	5

==== Repechage ====
Bronze medal semifinal
Hakobyan N. (ARM)	5
Bayantur G. (MGL)	0

Bronze medal final
Abdumalikov N. (UZB)	5
Krasinski M. (BLR)	0
Hakobyan N. (ARM)	5
Erdenesuren U. (MGL)	0

=== 65 kg ===
Group A
P	Player	Abdurakhmonov	Ziyoev	Eyvazov	Hammet	Pts
1	Abdurakhmonov D. (UZB)	–	5–0	5–0	5–0	3
2	Ziyoev O. (TJK)	0–5	–	5–0	5–0	2
3	Eyvazov E. (AZE)	0–5	0–5	–	5–0	1
4	Hammet R. (TUR)	0–5	0–5	0–5	–	0

Group B
P	Player	Khakimov	Estebesov	Hashen	Pts
1	Khakimov A. (RUS)	–	5–0	5–0	2
2	Estebesov D. (KGZ)	0–5	–	5–0	1
3	Hashen Y. (JOR)	0–5	0–5	–	0

==== Final ====
Final
Doniyor Abdurakhmonov (UZB)	0
Artur Khakimov (RUS)	5

=== 70 kg ===
Qualification
Raash B. (MGL)	5
Azamat D. (OSS)	0
Rusu C. (ROU)	0
Qurbonov M. (TJK)	5

Quarterfinals
Jasur M. (AZE)	5
Raash B. (MGL)	0
Azimjonov A. (UZB)	5
Moxomeg T. (TUN)	0
Falyakhov I. (RUS)	5
Edisher K. (ABH)	0
Qurbonov M. (TJK)	5
Mambetkaziev B. (KGZ)	0

Semifinals
Jasur M. (AZE)	5
Azimjonov A. (UZB)	0
Falyakhov I. (RUS)	5
Qurbonov M. (TJK)	0

Final
Azimjonov A. (UZB)	0
Falyakhov I. (RUS)	5

==== Repchage ====
Bronze medal matches
Jasur M. (AZE)	5
Moxomeg T. (TUN)	0
Qurbonov M. (TJK)	5
Edisher K. (ABH)	0

==== 75 kg ====
Qualification
Lalmiev A. (ISR)	0
Bektay B. (KAZ)	5

1/4 Finals
Tynchtyk Uul K. (KGZ)	5
Bektay B. (KAZ)	0
Khudoyor R. (TJK)	5
Khurelbaatar K. (MGL)	0
Sultonboev N. (UZB)	5
Eldeeb B. (EGY)	0
Karimullin D. (RUS)	5
Rzayev N. (AZE)	0

Semifinals
Tynchtyk Uul K. (KGZ)	5
Khudoyor R. (TJK)	0
Sultonboev N. (UZB)	0
Karimullin D. (RUS)	5

Final
Tynchtyk Uul K. (KGZ)	0
Karimullin D. (RUS)	5

===== Repchage =====
Bronze Medal Matches
Khudoyor R. (TJK)	5
Bektay B. (KAZ)	0
Sultonboev N. (UZB)	5
Rzayev N. (AZE)	0

==== 80 kg ====
Quarterfinals		Semifinals		Final
Mehdi H. (AZE)	5
Safaryan N. (ARM)	0	Mehdi H. (AZE)	5
Khurelbaatar K. (MGL)	5	Khurelbaatar K. (MGL)	0
Hafda M. (LBN)	0			Mehdi H. (AZE)	5
Zulkarnaev A. (RUS)	5			Zulkarnaev A. (RUS)	0
Soliev I. (UZB)	0	Zulkarnaev A. (RUS)	5
Turapbaev E. (KGZ)	5	Turapbaev E. (KGZ)	0
Ashurzoda A. (TJK)	0

===== Repchage =====
Bronze Medal Matches
Safaryan N. (ARM)	0
Khurelbaatar K. (MGL)	5
Soliev I. (UZB)	0
Turapbaev E. (KGZ)	5

==== 85 kg ====
Qualification
Zhahgbyrshy A. (KAZ)	5
Caraseni S. (ROU)	0

Quarterfinals
Zhahgbyrshy A. (KAZ)	5
Mazeika A. (LTU)	0
Muratbek Uul A. (KGZ)	5
Murzayev K. (AZE)	0
Galimullin R. (RUS)	5
Heidari H. (IRI)	0
Mashrabov I. (UZB)	5
Mangane I. (SEN)	0

Semifinals
Zhahgbyrshy A. (KAZ)	5
Muratbek Uul A. (KGZ)	0
Galimullin R. (RUS)	5
Mashrabov I. (UZB)	0

Final
Zhahgbyrshy A. (KAZ)	0
Galimullin R. (RUS)	5

===== Repchage =====
Bronze Medal Semifinal
Caraseni S. (ROU)	0
Mazeika A. (LTU)	5

Final
Muratbek Uul A. (KGZ)	5
Mazeika A. (LTU)	0
Mashrabov I. (UZB)	5
Heidari H. (IRI)	0

==== 90 kg ====
Quarterfinals		Semifinals		Final
Pahlavanzade U. (IRI)	3
Hossain M. (BAN)	1	Pahlavanzade U. (IRI)	3
Abdullah S. (AZE)	5	Abdullah S. (AZE)	1
Kadhim M. (IRQ)	0			Pahlavanzade U. (IRI)	0
Gabdrashitov A. (RUS)	5			Gabdrashitov A. (RUS)	5
Dubina I. (BLR)	0	Gabdrashitov A. (RUS)	5
Idrisov B. (KGZ)	0	Kamoldinov B. (UZB)	0
Kamoldinov B. (UZB)	5

===== Repchage =====
Bronze Medal Matches
Hossain M. (BAN)	0
Abdullah S. (AZE)	5
Dubina I. (BLR)	5
Kamoldinov B. (UZB)	0

==== 100 kg ====
Qualification
Myktybekov B. (KGZ)	5
Bahrytsevich Z. (BLR)	0

Quarterfinals
Myktybekov B. (KGZ)	5
Pashinsky I. (ISR)	0
Qurbonov D. (TJK)	3
Hysein S. (TUR)	1
Artikov Z. (UZB)	5
Mammadov Y. (AZE)	0
Rafikov R. (RUS)	5
Ravaev E. (IRI)	0

Semifinals
Myktybekov B. (KGZ)	5
Qurbonov D. (TJK)	0
Rafikov R. (RUS)	5
Artikov Z. (UZB)	0

Final
Myktybekov B. (KGZ)	0
Rafikov R. (RUS)	5

===== Repchage =====
Bronze Medal Semifinal
Bahrytsevich Z. (BLR)	5
Pashinsky I. (ISR)	0

Final
Bahrytsevich Z. (BLR)	0
Qurbonov D. (TJK)	5
Ravaev E. (IRI)	5
Artikov Z. (UZB)	0

=== 130 kg ===
Group A
P	Player	Homidov	Faizulloev	Ismayilov	Pts
1	Homidov Azimjon (TJK)	–	5–0	5–0	2
2	Faizulloev Firdavs (TJK)	0–5	–	3–1	1
3	Ismayilov Musa (AZE)	0–5	1–3	–	0

Group B
P	Player	Salakhov	Mirzakhmatov	Abueida	Pts
1	Salakhov Radik (RUS)	–	5–0	5–0	2
2	Mirzakhmatov Ilyosbek (UZB)	0–5	–	5–0	1
3	Abueida Mohanad (PLE)	0–5	0–5	–	0

==== Final ====
Final
Salakhov Radik (RUS)	5
Homidov Azimjon (TJK)	0

=== +130 kg ===
Group A
P	Player	Gilyazetdinov	Kalybek Uulu	Salomov	Pts
1	Ranis Gilyazetdinov (RUS)	–	5–0	5–0	2
2	Abdusalom Salomov (TJK)	0–5	5-0	-	1
3	Muktarbek Kalybek Uulu (KGZ)	0–5	-	0–5	0

Group B
P	Player	Pirmatov	Yusifov	Shadman	Pts
1	Azimi Shadman (IRI)	3-1	5–0	–	2
2	Khislat Pirmatov (UZB)	-	5-0	1–3	1
3	Khasay Yusifov (AZE)	0–5	-	0–5	0

==== Final ====
Final
Ranis Gilyazetdinov (RUS)	5
Azimi Shadman (IRI)	0

== See also ==
- 2024 BRICS Games
