= Acrobatic rock and roll at the 2024 BRICS Games =

Acrobatic rock and roll event

Breaking at the 2024 BRICS Games
- Venue: Dynamo Sports Palace
- Location: Moscow, Russia
- Dates: 24 June

Acrobatic rock and roll at the 2024 BRICS Games in Moscow was held from 24 June 2024.

== Medal summary ==
=== Medal table ===
* Host nation (Russia)

Rank	Nation	Gold	Silver	Bronze	Total
1	Russia (RUS)*	2	0	0	2
2	Egypt (EGY)	0	1	1	2
3	Hungary (HUN)	0	1	0	1
4	Moldova (MDA)	0	0	1	1
Totals (4 entries)		2	2	2	6

=== Medalists ===
The winners were as follows:

Event	Gold	Silver	Bronze
Rock'n'Roll B class Adults	Russia; Raylyan Ivanbr; Klopyzhnikova Elizaveta; Nord Diamond	Egypt; Rokhlin Kirill; Arafa Sofia Ahmed Muhamed	Moldova; Donos Alexei; Nikolaeva Alexandra
Rock'n'Roll M class Adults	Russia; Chebotarev Maxim; Adamova Victoria	Hungary; Deli Alex; Bihari Luca	Egypt; Boiko Akeksandr; Arafa Valeriya Ahmed Muhamed

== Results ==
=== Rock'n'Roll B class Adults ===
Rank	Number	Athlete
1	32	Raylyan Ivan (RUS); Klopyzhnikova Elizaveta (RUS)
2	16	Rokhlin Kirill (EGY); Arafa Sofia Ahmed Muhamed (EGY)
3	28	Donos Alexei (MDA); Nikolaeva Alexandra (MDA)
4	35	Mitrofanov Maxim (RUS); Sheinina Juliia (RUS)
5	2	Gladkikh Nikita (ARM); Chernyshova Alexandra (ARM)
6	6	Solovev Lev (BUL); Boshkova Evelina (BUL)
7	30	Bazhenov Nikita (PAR); Santander Britos Sofia Deliani (PAR)
8	19	Ravi Sugisenan (IND); Shobolova Diana (IND)
9	14	Gusev Nikita (GEO); Sadunian Sofiia (GEO)
10	13	Kokoshuev Aleksandr (GER); Kalinicheva Sofia (GER)
11	38	Gasparec Michal (SVK); Zhuravleva Kristina (SVK)
12	8	Morozov Mikhai (BLR); Konakhava Darya (BLR)
13	1	Baranov Alexey (ARM); Kagramanyan Liubov Sofia (ARM)
14	3	Zabi Zabiullah (AFG); Khromova Uliana (AFG)
15	26	Yang Ziran (CHN); Gordilova Anna (CHN)
16	23	Sharafutdinov Bulat (KAZ); Kadirova Ellina (KAZ)
17	17	Poliakov Ivan (ISR); Ponomariova Polina (ISR)
18	25	Meng Xiangyu (CHN); Skobeleva Daria (CHN)
19	21	Bagheri Kourosh (IRI); Dmitrochenkova Anastasia (IRI)
20	41	Funaric Teo (CRO); Vidakovic Lana (CRO)
21	7	Yancheuski Illia (BLR); Prudnikova Maria (BLR)
22	37	Diouf Robert (SEN); Sagna Clarisse Lea (SEN)
23	40	Diallo Youssouf (SEN); Camara Fatou Kin (SEN)
24	40	Kenzhetaev Aidos (UZB); Novikova Diana (UZB)
25	42	Kenzhetaev Aidos (ECU); Novikova Diana (ECU)
26	9	Tutynin Sergey (BUL); Dmitrova Stephanie (BUL)
27	44	Pakhomov Denys (World Team); Tagieva Ekaterina (World Team)
28	45	Dlamini Sisekelo (SWZ); Petrova Ulyana (SWZ)
29	4	Mahmodi Eid Mohammad (AFG); Serguniaeva Mariia (AFG)
30	29	Kokhan Aleksandr (MGL); Erdene-Ochir Egshglen (MGL)
31	20	Siddharth Sukhdeo Ingale (IND); Danilova Alina (IND)
32	31	Chizhichenko Vladimir (PAR); Sosa Lugo Maria Arami (PAR)
33	24	Vargas Contreras Johan Steven (IRI); Askariarjas Asna (IRI)
34	22	Kenzhetaev Aidos (ECU); Novikova Diana (ECU)
35	27	Elian Alejandro Jiron Morales (COL); Liseth Alejandra Marquez Vega (COL)

=== Rock'n'Roll M class Adults ===
Rank	Number	Athlete
1	33	Chebotarev Maxim (RUS); Adamova Victoria (RUS)
2	12	Deli Alex (HUN); Bihari Luca (HUN)
3	15	Boiko Akeksandr (EGY); Arafa Valeriya Ahmed Muhamed (EGY)
4	32	Tanakbaev Danii (RUS); Zhurina Anna (RUS)
5	5	Kosenkov Mikhail (BLR); Poznyak Alexandra (BLR)
6	11	Gordin Andrey (GBR); Danchenko Vera (GBR)
7	43	Bazhenov Nikita (PER); Santander Britos Sofia Deliani (PER)
8	6	Filippov Andrey (BLR); Kozhevnikova Anastasiia (BLR)
9	18	Akshai Jagdish Unecha (IND); Idiatullina Albina (IND)
10	33	Mansurov Arslanjon Bahrom Ugli (UZB); Khamidullina Luiza (UZB)

== See also ==
- 2024 BRICS Games
