= 2024 BRICS Games =

Sporting event in Russia

- Emblem of the 2024 BRICS Games
- Location: Kazan, Russia
- Start date: 12 June 2024
- End date: 23 June 2024
- Competitors: 2851 athletes from 82 nations

The 2024 BRICS Games, also known as the 2024 BRICS Sports Games, was an international multi-sport competition running from 12 to 23 June 2024 in Kazan, Russia, organized by countries belonging to the economic association BRICS, and was held in Kazan in connection with Russia's chairmanship of BRICS in 2024.

== Schedule ==
The games officially took place from 12 June to 23 June 2024 (from 11 June to 25 June including related events). The opening ceremony took place on Wednesday the 12 June 2024, while events such as tennis and rowing had preliminary rounds on the 11 June.

Schedule
	11 Jun	12 Jun	13 Jun	14 Jun	15 Jun	16 Jun	17 Jun	18 Jun	19 Jun	20 Jun	21 Jun	22 Jun	23 Jun	24 Jun	25 Jun
Athletics			Arrival	Training	Prelims	Finals	Finals	Departure							
Swimming							Arrival	Prelimsc	Finals	Finals	Finals	Departure			
Diving				Prelims	Prelims	Finals	Finals	Finals	Departure						
Synchronized swimming	Arrival	Prelims	Finals	Finals	Finals	Departure									
Artistic gymnastics	Arrival	Prelims	Finals	Finals	Finals	Departure									
Rhythmic gymnastics								Arrival	Prelims	Finals	Finals	Finals		Departure	
Kayaking and canoeing							Prelims	Prelims	Finals	Finals	Finals	Finals		Departure	
Rowing sport	Prelims	Prelims	Finals	Finals	Finals	Finals	Departure								
Judo									Arrival	Prelims	Finals	Finals		Departure	
Wushu	Arrival	Prelims	Finals	Finals	Finals	Finals	Departure								
Karate		Arrival	Prelims	Finals	Finals	Departure									
Fencing							Arrival	Prelims	Finals	Finals	Finals	Finals		Departure	
Weightlifting		Prelims	Finals	Finals	Finals	Departure									
Badminton	Arrival	Prelims	Finals	Finals	Finals	Finals	Departure								
Tennis	Prelims	Prelims	Finals	Finals	Finals	Finals	Finals	Finals	Finals	Departure					
Koresh									Arrival	Prelims	Finals			Departure	
Belt wrestling										Arrival	Prelims	Finals		Departure	
Sambo	Prelims	Prelims	Finals	Finals	Departure										
Freestyle wrestling					Prelims	Prelims	Finals	Finals	Finals	Departure					
Greco-Roman wrestling								Prelims	Finals	Finals	Departure				
Table tennis	Arrival	Prelims	Finals	Finals	Finals	Finals	Departure								
Boxing							Prelims	Training	Finals	Finals	Finals	Finals		Departure	
Chess							Arrival	Finals	Finals	Finals	Finals	Departure			
Phygital basketball			Arrival	Prelims	Finals	Finals	Finals	Finals	Departure						
Phygital football								Arrival	Prelims	Finals	Finals	Finals	Departure		
Horseback riding						Arrival	Prelims	Prelims	Finals	Finals	Departure				
Breaking											Arrival	Finals	Finals	Departure	
Acrobatic rock and roll													Arrival	Finals	Departure

== Participants ==
More than 60 countries were invited to participate. As of 1 June 2024, representatives from 97 countries confirmed their participation; at the opening ceremony on 12 June, participants from 89 countries were announced. According to the online publication Mediazona, the leaked lists of accommodation of athletes in hotels and dormitories on the campus of the Kazan (Volga region) Federal University indicate that representatives of 37 foreign states were registered, including from partially recognized states Abkhazia, South Ossetia, and Taiwan (as Chinese Taipei), and the subnational entity Republika Srpska. Foreign students studying at Russian universities also participated. The largest delegations were from Russia, Brazil and China. It was noted that most countries sent weaker teams, with the exception of Russia, Belarus, and Brazil. However, only 80 delegations were present. 23 delegations only took part in events in Moscow. Chad, Romania, and Lithuania were initially listed as participants in Koresh belt wrestling, but eventually did not participate; their planned matches remained on the tournament records.

Participants by country
Country or territory	Number of participants
Abkhazia	58
/Afghanistan (Note: The delegation used a flag depicting the 2024 BRICS Games logo but using the flag Islamic Republic of Afghanistan in Moscow event.)	27
Algeria	1
Argentina	2
Armenia	35
Azerbaijan	98 (details)
Bahrain	22
Bangladesh	1
Belarus	409
Brazil	110
Bulgaria	3
Burkina Faso	13
Cambodia	5
China	122
Chile	2
Colombia	8
Croatia	2
Cuba	17
Ecuador	3
Egypt	35
Eritrea	8
Eswatini	2
Ethiopia	56
France	2
Gabon	1
Germany	3
Ghana	2
Georgia	2
Hong Kong	2
Hungary	2
India	142
Indonesia	3
Israel	4
Iraq	10
Iran	55
Italy	?
Japan	4
Jordan	2
Kazakhstan	118
Kuwait	2
Kyrgyzstan	142
Lebanon	3
Malaysia	6
Mali	4
Mexico	4
Moldova	12
Mongolia	17
Namibia	?
Nigeria	2
North Korea	12
Pakistan	17
Palestine	1
Paraguay	2
Peru	3
Portugal	4
Republika Srpska	63 (details)
Russia	642
Serbia	3
Senegal	3
Slovakia	2
South Africa	33
South Korea	4
South Ossetia	25
Syria	25
Switzerland	1
Chinese Taipei	6
Tajikistan	80
Thailand	27
Togo	1
Tunisia	1
Turkey	3
UAE	45
Uganda	?
United Kingdom	2
Uzbekistan	270
Venezuela	35
Vietnam	8
World Team	2
Yemen	1
Zambia	1

=== Absent delegations in Koresh tournament record ===
Country
Chad
Romania
Lithuania

=== Delegations only have official ===
Country or territory	Role
Mauritania	Referee in Belt Wrestling (Women)
Austria	Judge in Breaking
Macau	Judge in Breaking
USA	Judge in Breaking

=== Absent delegations ===
The delegations was registered in at least one sport but eventually absent.

Country or territory	Flag appearance
Botswana	Opening ceremony
Bolivia	Opening ceremony
Bosnia and Herzegovina	Eventually represent Republika Srpska but mini flag appear in some venue involve Republika Srpska
Central African Republic	Opening ceremony, Weightlifting
Nicaragua	Opening ceremony
Morocco	Opening ceremony
Puerto Rico	Opening ceremony, Breaking
Spain	Opening ceremony
Turkmenistan	Opening ceremony, Wrestling
Zimbabwe	Opening ceremony

== Organization ==
The BRICS Games were used by Russian athletes as an alternative to participation in the 2024 Summer Olympics, where the country is not allowed to attend by decision of the International Olympic Committee (with the exception of a small number of individual athletes in non-team disciplines) due to the 2022 Russian invasion of Ukraine and various doping in Russia controversies. The 2024 BRICS games were several times larger than all previous BRICS games – 387 sets of medals were awarded in 27 sports, while the next-largest BRICS games were the 2023 edition in South Africa where only five sports were contested.

A total of 1,276 medals were awarded to the 2,970 participants (0.43 medal per participant) including 509 medals to the 641 participants from the Russian delegation (0.79 medal per participant). This compares to the 1,080 medals awarded to the 11,420 participants in the Tokyo 2020 (0.09 medal per participant).

1.8 billion rubles were allocated for the competitions and 5 billion rubles were allocated to prepare the infrastructure. 358.4 thousand rubles were allocated in prize money for gold medal-winners, 179.2 thousand rubles for silver, and 107.5 thousand rubles for bronze medallists. The games' competitions involve 17 sports facilities and provide 95 thousand tickets for spectators.

The opening ceremony was held on 12 June 2024 in the concert hall of the international exhibition complex Kazan Expo with the participation of the Minister of Sports of the Russian Federation M. Degtyarev and the head of the Republic of Tatarstan R. Minnikhanov in the presence of athletes and official guests without ordinary spectators. Instead of the closing ceremony on June 23, 2024, participation of athletes and guests participate in the Sabantuy festival on the closing of the Games.

The mascot of the games is the leopard Bricsic. The logo of the games is a rectangle with the text BRICS (letters in blue, red, orange, green and yellow) at the top, the words GAMES (in red) and a stylized tulip with the Kazan Syuyumbike tower (in green) in the middle and the numbers 2024 (in red) with the text "RUSSIA•KAZAN" (in black) below. The games are presented by ambassadors led by figure skater Alina Zagitova, football player Gökdeniz Karadeniz, saber fencer Sofia Velikaya, and gymnast Yana Batyrshina.

The main broadcasters of the games are the television and radio companies Match TV and TNV.

== Sports ==
There were 27 sports contested at the 2024 BRICS Games.

Results:

- Acrobatic rock and roll (details)
- Badminton (details)
- Boxing (details)
- Belt wrestling
- Breaking (details)
- Canoeing
- Rowing
- Judo
- Karate
- Equestrian sports
- Koresh (details)
- Athletics (details)
- Table tennis (details)
- Swimming
- Diving
- Sambo
- Synchronized swimming
- Wrestling
- Artistic gymnastics (details)
- Tennis
- Weightlifting
- Wushu
- Fencing
- Phygital basketball (details)
- Phygital football (details)
- Chess (details)
- Rhythmic gymnastics (details)

== Medal table ==
The medal tally is maintained by the BRICS Games website. The table shown is provided as-is from the website.

* Host nation (Russia)

Rank	Nation	Gold	Silver	Bronze	Total
1	Russia (RUS)	266	142	101	509
2	Belarus (BLR)	55	85	107	247
3	China (CHN)	20	24	18	62
4	Uzbekistan (UZB)	17	39	58	114
5	Brazil (BRA)	8	20	23	51
6	Iran (IRI)	4	12	20	36
7	Azerbaijan (AZE)	4	9	21	34
8	India (IND)	3	6	20	29
9	Kyrgyzstan (KGZ)	2	11	38	51
10	Kazakhstan (KAZ)	2	11	17	30
11	South Africa (RSA)	1	3	3	7
12	Mongolia (MGL)	1	1	10	12
13	Abkhazia (ABH)	1	1	5	7
14	Armenia (ARM)	1	0	7	8
15	Turkey (TUR)	1	0	1	2
16	Pakistan (PAK)	1	0	0	1
17	Tajikistan (TJK)	0	3	17	20
18	Thailand (THA)	0	3	6	9
19	Venezuela (VEN)	0	2	6	8
20	Egypt (EGY)	0	2	5	7
21	North Korea (PRK)	0	2	1	3
22	South Ossetia (OSS)	0	1	4	5
23	United Arab Emirates (UAE)	0	1	3	4
24	Serbia (SRB)	0	1	1	2
25	Hungary (HUN)	0	1	0	1
25	Italy (ITA)	0	1	0	1
25	Kuwait (KUW)	0	1	0	1
28	Republika Srpska (SRP)	0	0	3	3
29	Ghana (GHA)	0	0	2	2
29	Syria (SYR)	0	0	2	2
31	Bulgaria (BUL)	0	0	1	1
31	Burkina Faso (BUR)	0	0	1	1
31	Cuba (CUB)	0	0	1	1
31	Eritrea (ERI)	0	0	1	1
31	Japan (JPN)	0	0	1	1
31	Moldova (MDA)	0	0	1	1
31	Nigeria (NGR)	0	0	1	1
31	Senegal (SEN)	0	0	1	1
Totals (38 entries)		387	382	507	1,276

== See also ==
- University International Sports Festival – in Yekaterinburg, Russia from 19 August 2023 to 31 August 2023.
- Games of the Future – in Kazan, Russia from 21 February to 3 March 2024.
- 2024 World Friendship Games – in Moscow and Yekaterinburg, Russia from 15 to 29 September 2024.
- Intervision 2025
