= Minsk Cycling Club =

Minsk Cycling Club may refer to:

- Minsk Cycling Club (men's team), a professional cycling team that competes on the UCI Continental circuits
- Minsk Cycling Club (women's team), a professional cycling team that competes on the UCI Women's World Tour
