= Phygital sport =

Hybrid sport combining esports and field games

The phygital sports are a hybrid sport that combines digital (mainly multiplayer/simulation video game) and physical (sport), with the objective to score the highest number of points in the two formats. Phygital sport includes both individual and team competitions.

== Origin ==
The term "phygital" is a neologism coined in 2007 by the Australian organization Experience Design. It combines two words - physical and digital. The term was created to describe new "hybrid" spaces where the real and the virtual interact to create an environment where people and connected interfaces coexist. Over time, the term has come to apply to events that utilize a combination of virtual and real practices. Typically, phygital events incorporate technology to create an interactive, immersive and engaging experience for participants.

== Description ==
Competitions in phygital sports are usually held in two stages. In the first part, athletes compete in a virtual analog of the game, and in the second part in a classic sport. Both parts of the competition are equal. In the digital stage, participants compete in a simulation game using a smartphone, tablet, computer, game console or virtual reality headset. The physical stage of the competition is conducted using analogs of traditional sports: soccer field, hockey box, basketball court, driving range, octagon and others. For example, the team plays the first soccer match in the video game FIFA and then moves to the field. All the goals scored in the cyber and classic match are totaled. Phygital sports can be arranged for almost any sport that has a virtual version.

=== As an official sport ===
Phygital sport is actively developing in Russia. In January 2023, phygital sport was recognized as an official sport in the country. The following month the All-Russian Federation of Phygital Sports was established, and by 2024 more than 60 branches of the organization were opened across the country. The first Phygital Sports tournament was held in Kazan in 2022. After that, nine more games in a similar format were held there.

Russia also organized an international phygital sports tournament, the Games of the Future. It is believed that these games were organized to overcome Russia's isolation in the international sports arena following the full-scale Russian invasion of Ukraine in 2022. The competition took place in February 2024 in Kazan. More than 2,000 athletes from 277 teams took part in the Games. The competition featured more than twenty disciplines, divided into five areas: "Sport", "Tactics", "Strategy", "Speed" and "Technology". Vladimir Putin took part in the opening of the competition. The budget of the event amounted to more than 6 billion rubles. The tournament, which had a prize pool of $10 million, was attended by many tier-one teams, including PSG.LGD, Azure, Ray, Beastcoast, and Entity. Among the invited teams was Nigma Galaxy, which refused to participate in the Games of the Future due to negative reactions and calls for a boycott of teams participating in the Russian tournament.

Phygital Basketball and Phygital Football are part of the 2024 BRICS Games event.

The 2025 Games of the Future were held in the United Arab Emirates.

In addition, the Metaverse Gaming League has many divisions, ranging from beginner divisions where anyone can join, to the pro divisions that are only accessible through qualification.

== See also ==
- Games of the Future
- Esports
- Fantasy sport
