= 2023 Summer World University Games =

Cancelled multi-sport event in Yekaterinburg, Russia

2023 Summer World University Games 2023 Летняя Универсиада
- Host city: Yekaterinburg, Russia
- Motto: For You
- Sport: 18
- Events: 247
- Opening: 19 July (cancelled)
- Closing: 31 July (cancelled)
- Main venue: Ekaterinburg Arena (opening/closing ceremonies)
- Website: ekat2023.com (archived)

The 2023 FISU Summer World University Games (Universiade), commonly known as Yekaterinburg 2023 or Ekaterinburg 2023, was planned to be the 32nd edition of the event, which was to be held from 19 to 31 July 2023 in Yekaterinburg, Russia.

On 29 April 2022, FISU "suspended" Yekaterinburg's hosting rights for the Games due to the Russian invasion of Ukraine, stating that its hosting of the Games may be "postponed to a later date". In May 2022, FISU postponed the 2021 Summer World University Games in Chengdu, China, by one more year to 2023 due to the COVID-19 pandemic in China. While this made Chengdu the host of a World University Games held in 2023, these Games were still officially considered the 2021 Summer World University Games, and therefore the 2023 Games scheduled for Yekaterinburg were cancelled.

To replace the suspended 2023 Summer World University Games, Russian authorities announced that they would host the inaugural University International Sports Festival as a replacement.

== Sports ==
Three sport is in 2023 addition.

- Aquatics
  - Diving (15)
  - Swimming (42)
  - Water polo (2)
- Archery (10)
- Athletics (50)
- Badminton (6)
- Basketball (2)
- Boxing (13)
- Fencing (12)
- Gymnastics
  - Artistic gymnastics (14)
  - Rhythmic gymnastics (8)
- Judo (16)
- Rugby sevens (2)
- Table tennis (7)
- Taekwondo (23)
- Tennis (7)
- Volleyball (2)
- Sambo (18)
