= World Friendship Games =

Multi-sport event in Russia

- World Friendship games logo
- Venue: Luzhniki Stadium
- Location: Moscow, Yekaterinburg
- Website: wfgames.org

The World Friendship Games (Russian: Всемирные игры дружбы, Vsemirnye igry druzhby) was a planned international multi-sport event expected to be held in Moscow and Yekaterinburg, Russia from 15 to 29 September 2024. Unlike the Olympic Games, where athletes only compete for medals, athletes at the World Friendship Games would have been rewarded with monetary awards in addition to receiving medals.

In July 2024, it was announced that the World Friendship Games would be postponed to an unknown date in 2025. In August 2024, the games were postponed again to either late 2025 or 2026. In December 2024, the games were put on hold indefinitely, with the possibility of the games being brought back by a "special decision of the president" (who is currently Vladimir Putin).

== History ==
As a result of an ongoing doping scandal and the Russian invasion of Ukraine in 2022, Russia has been excluded from almost every sporting competition, and Russian athletes have been unable to use their national symbols at international sporting events, which also includes the Olympics, which have only allowed Russian and Belarusian athletes to compete at the 2024 summer Olympics as Individual Neutral Athletes. In response, the Russian government announced its intent to organize competitions for the country's top athletes with the possibility for other countries to participate.

In May 2023, Russian Sports Minister Oleg Matytsin confirmed Russia will host the second edition of Friendship Games in 2024, shortly after the Summer Olympics in Paris. The first edition was hosted by the Soviet Union in Moscow as a substitute for the 1984 Los Angeles Olympics, which it boycotted. The Organizing Committee of the Games was formed in October 2023. In addition to winning medals, athletes will receive cash prizes. The total prize money offered amounts to 4.6 billion Russian rubles (approximately US$49 million).

On 2 July 2024, it was announced that the games will be postponed until 2025. In August 2024 the games were postponed for a second time to either late 2025 or 2026.

== International reaction ==
On November 14, 2023, the IOC, represented by James Macleod, director of relations with National Olympic Committees, made recommendations to the committees regarding possible participation in the competitions:

Considering the increasing politicization of world sport, we would ask that all NOCs exercise caution with respect to this initiative. Indeed, any NOC involvement in the World Friendship Games would not only go against the IOC EB's recommendation of 25 February 2022 with respect to international sporting events being held in Russia but also against the Olympic Movement's collective aim of maintaining the independence and autonomy of sport.

The Organizing Committee of the 2024 World Friendship Games responded to the IOC statement, noting that the purpose of the upcoming Games was never either confrontation with the IOC or the creation of competitions in opposition to the Olympic movement.

On November 21, 2023, the Games were discussed at a meeting of the UN General Assembly. IOC president Thomas Bach said it was too early to talk about the consequences of the Games, but different options were being considered.

Russian deputy permanent representative at the UN Maria Zabolotskaya spoke about the inadmissibility of any discrimination against athletes at competitions and invited the world to the Friendship Games.

In March 2024, IOC president Thomas Bach urged a boycott of Russia's planned 'Friendship Games' and labelled the event a "cynical attempt" by the country to "politicize sport": this caused the Russian foreign ministry spokeswoman, Maria Zakharova, to launch a personal attack on Bach, accusing him and the IOC of "slipping into racism and neo-Nazism".

== Branding ==
The logo of the 2024 World Friendship Games was presented in Saint Petersburg as part of the Russia-Africa summit, which took place from 27 to 28 July 2023. The logo depicts two white hands clasped across a globe. The games mascot, a tiger named Dobryak, was unveiled on 5 March 2024.

== Venues ==
=== Moscow ===
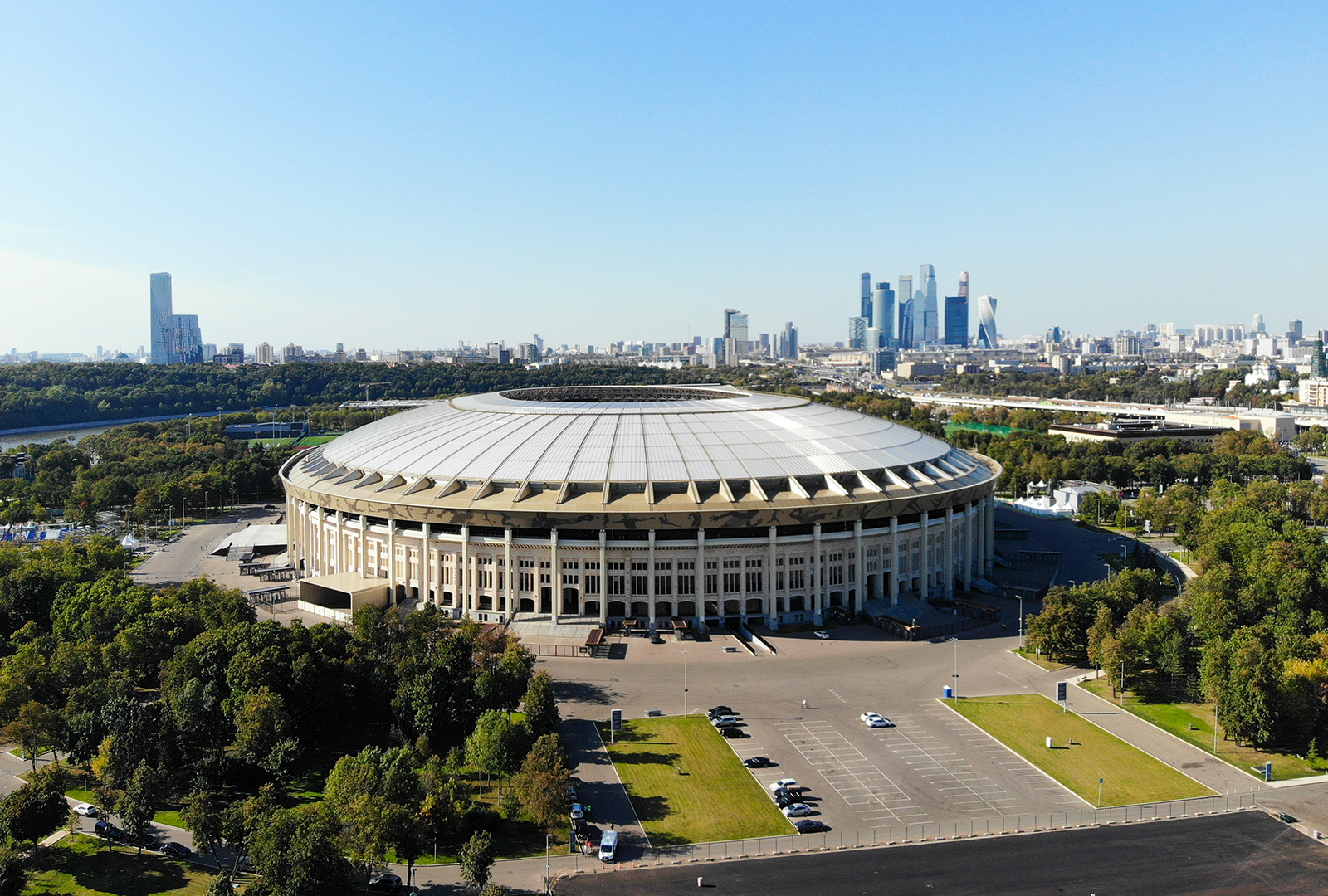
Luzhniki Stadium in Moscow

Most of the sports programme, as well as the opening and closing ceremonies, were planned to take place in Moscow.

=== Yekaterinburg ===
All competitions in Yekaterinburg would have been held at existing sports facilities; the construction of new facilities was not planned.

== Participants ==
According to Infobae on 28 March 2024, Alexey Sorokin (the director general of the World Friendship Games Organizing Committee) claimed that athletes from "at least" 70 nations might participate. On 22 April 2024, HuffPost noted Russian media claims that 5,500 participants would take part in the 2024 World Friendship Games, compared to the maximum quota of 10,500 at the 2024 Summer Olympics.

At the time of postponement, the organizers claimed to have received applications from 2,500 athletes from 127 countries. However, Belarusian sports journalist Dmitri Navosha told The New York Times on 25 July 2024 that the postponement was "a sign" that the organizers were not attracting enough countries.

== Sports ==
The sports programme was planned to include 33 sports:

Moscow:

- Acrobatic rock 'n' roll
- Archery
- Artistic gymnastics
- Badminton
- Basketball (Men, 3x3)
- Beach handball
- Beach soccer
- Beach tennis
- Beach volleyball
- Boxing
- Break dancing
- Canoe slalom
- Chess
- Competitive programming
- Cycling
- Diving (High Diving)
- Equestrian sports
- Fencing
- Karate
- Padel
- Rhythmic gymnastics
- Sambo
- Skateboarding
- Sport climbing
- Table tennis
- Taekwondo
- Triathlon
- Weightlifting
- Wrestling

Yekaterinburg:

- Artistic swimming
- Athletics
- Basketball (Women)
- Diving
- Judo
- Jujutsu
- Mixed martial arts
- Swimming

In addition, mas-wrestling and sumo were planned to be held as demonstration sports.

== See also ==
- Games of the Future – in Kazan, Russia from 21 February to 3 March 2024.
- 2024 BRICS Games – in Kazan, Russia from 11 to 24 June 2024.
- University International Sports Festival – in Yekaterinburg, Russia from 19 August 2023 to 31 August 2023.
- Intervision 2025
