= 2021 CIS Games =

Multi-sport event in Russia

- Host city: Kazan
- Country: Russia
- Motto: Our Strength Lies in the Commonwealth! (В Содружестве наша сила!)
- Edition: 1st
- Nations: 9
- Athletes: over 2000
- Events: 181 in 15 sports
- Dates: 4–11 September 2021
- Website: ciskazan2021.com

The 2021 CIS Games (Russian: I игры стран СНГ 2021, Tatar: I нче БДБ илләре уеннары) was the inaugural edition of the CIS Games. It took place from 4 to 11 September 2021 in Kazan, the capital of Tatarstan, Russia and included athletes from all nine member states of the Commonwealth of Independent States (CIS). The slogan of the Games is "Our Strength Lies in the Commonwealth!" (В Содружестве наша сила!)

== Development and preparation ==
The Games were officially introduced on 27 June 2019, after an initiative of the Ministry of Sport of Russia was passed to the President of Russia Vladimir Putin, who accepted it. Initially, the Games were due to take place from 20 to 27 September 2020, but they were finally postponed to next year after a series of postponements due to complications caused by the COVID-19 pandemic.

According to Business Online, in 2020 the Games' expenses would have been around 500 million rubles, 80% of which would have been covered by the Federal Center.

On 12 July 2021, in an online meeting of leaders of sport ministries it was announced, that around 2,000 athletes, for the most part aged between 14 and 23, and 600 officials will participate at the Games. Overall, 184 set of medals will be awarded and 11 venues will be used, with the main venue being the Universiade Village, which was used during the 2013 Summer Universiade. On 28 July 2021, Rustam Minnikhanov, President of Tatarstan, headed a session of the Republican Organization Committee. There it was announced, that about 1,500 athletes will participate.

According to a session on 6 August 2021, every participating team should include one COVID specialist.

=== Festivals and forums ===
A cultural festival took place in the Village. For the participants there was a "launch zone", which included photo locations, master classes, relax zones and multimedia zones, ending in concerts in the evening. Besides, a sports forum called "Russia – Country of Sports" took place during the Games.

== The Games ==
=== Ceremony ===
The opening ceremony took place in the Universiade Village, which was also used as a housing complex for the participants.

=== Sports ===
There was a total of 15 sport events. (Note: In Russia, shooting sport is traditionally divided into two separate sport events: bullseye shooting and skeet shooting. That is the reason why Russian sources name 16 sport events.) Junior (under 23) athletes participated in most events, except for Muay Thai (men and women), futsal (only men) and kurash (men and girls).

Common Sports (44)

- Badminton (6)
- 3x3 basketball (2)
- Dancesport (4)
- Futsal (1)
- Rhythmic gymnastics (6)
- Shooting (18)
- Table tennis (7)

Combat Sports (137)

- Boxing (26)
- Belt wrestling (14)
- Judo (15)
- Kurash (10)
- Karate (12)
- Muay Thai (16)
- Sambo (14)
- Wrestling (30)

=== Nations ===
- Armenia
- Azerbaijan
- Belarus
- Kazakhstan
- Kyrgyzstan
- Moldova
- Russia
- Tajikistan
- ~~Turkmenistan~~
- Uzbekistan

== Medal summary ==
* Host nation (Russia)

2020 CIS Games medal table
Rank	Nation	Gold	Silver	Bronze	Total
1	Russia*	114	42	59	215
2	Uzbekistan	23	32	36	91
3	Kazakhstan	18	35	53	106
4	Azerbaijan	15	16	29	60
5	Belarus	8	32	29	69
6	Kyrgyzstan	3	10	25	38
7	Tajikistan	0	7	7	14
8	Armenia	0	5	8	13
9	Moldova	0	2	11	13
Totals (9 entries)		181	181	257	619

== Calendar ==
OC	Opening ceremony	●	Event competitions	1	Gold medal events	CC	Closing ceremony

September 2021	2nd Thu	3rd Fri	4th Sat	5th Sun	6th Mon	7th Tue	8th Wed	9th Thu	10th Fri	11th Sat	Events
Ceremonies			OC							CC	—N/a
Badminton						●	1	●	●	5	6
3x3 basketball				●	2						2
Belt wrestling				14							14
Boxing	●	●	●	26							26
Dancesport							1	1	2		4
Futsal						●	●	●	●	1	1
Judo								14	1		15
Karate									●	12	12
Kurash					10						10
Muay Thai				●	●	●	16				16
Rhythmic gymnastics								●	1	5	6
Sambo						14					14
Shooting					2	6	5	4	1		18
Table tennis						●	2	2	1	2	7
Wrestling		10	20								30
Daily medal events		10	20	40	14	20	25	21	6	25	181
Cumulative total		10	30	70	84	104	129	150	156	181	181
September 2021	2nd Thu	3rd Fri	4th Sat	5th Sun	6th Mon	7th Tue	8th Wed	9th Thu	10th Fri	11th Sat	Total events

== Marketing ==
=== Logo and mascot ===
The snow leopard, the official mascot of the Games

The Games' official logo was the firebird (жар-птица), a common Slavic fairytale character which is also common in other cultures. The official mascot was а bars, a (snow) leopard. The firebird symbolizes freedom, speed, height, as it is skyrocketing skyward. It is also a symbol of hospitality and the diverse cultures living in the CIS territory. Each feather is coloured according to the flags of the CIS nations. The design of the mascot was created by Ibragim Durdiev from Moscow. The snow leopard has been the symbol of the Volga Bulgars, who were also known as the "Bars tribe" or "barsils". For them, the bars was a deity of fertility and the defence of children. It should symbolize energy, agility, strength and the will to win, as well as hospitality and fortune.

== Broadcasting ==
A live broadcasting via internet was available during the Games.

== See also ==
- Spartakiade
