= Games of the Future =

International multi-sport tournament

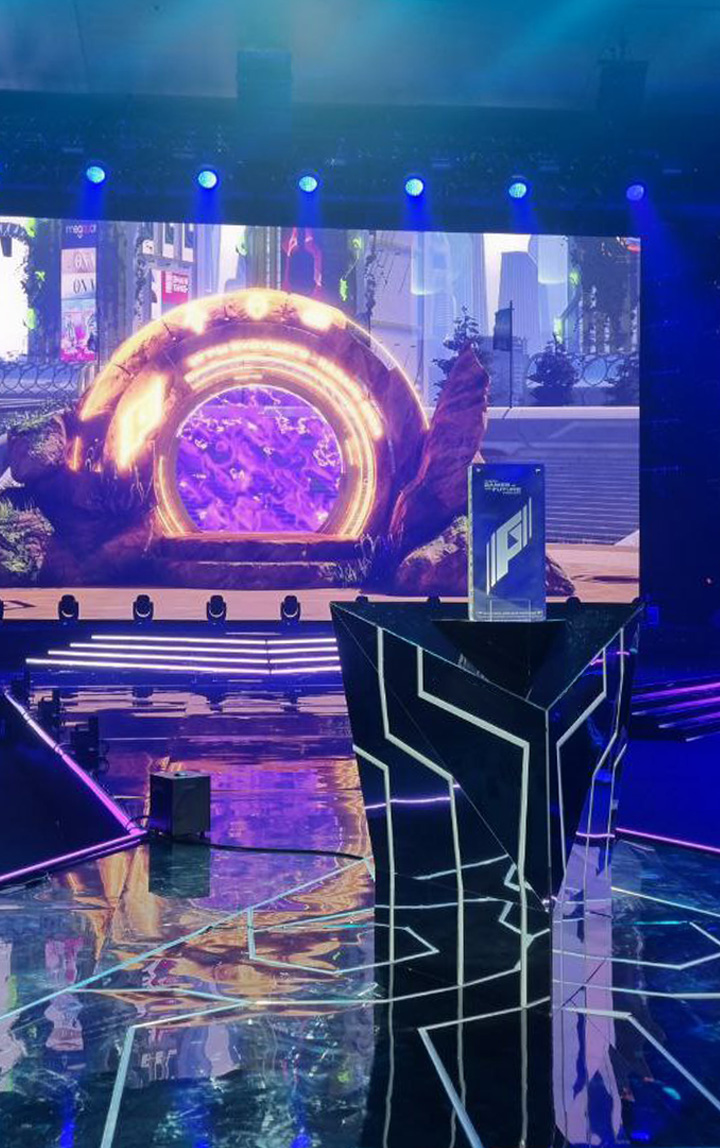
- Games of the Future trophy

Tournament information
- Sport: Counter-Strike 2, Dota 2, World of Tanks, laser tag, skateboarding, basketball
- Location: Kazan, Russia (2024) Abu Dhabi, United Arab Emirates (2025) Astana, Kazakhstan (2026)
- Participants: 2,000+
- Website: https://gofuture.games/

The Games of the Future (Russian: Игры будущего; Arabic: العاب المستقبل, Kazakh: Болашақ ойындары, romanized: Bolaşaq oiyndary) is an annual global phygital (fusing physical and digital) sports tournament, organized by Phygital International.

== Format ==
Players compete in their chosen discipline across two rounds. In one round they play the physical version of the discipline, such as a football match, and in the second round they play the gaming equivalent. Disciplines include football, basketball, and dancing.

== Editions ==
After a bidding process run by Phygital International, the annual event is awarded to a host country.

Year	Country	Host city	Event dates	Announcement date
2024	Russia	Kazan	February 21–March 3, 2024	
2025	United Arab Emirates	Abu Dhabi	18–23 December	June 1, 2024
2026	Kazakhstan	Astana	18 July–1 August	October 14, 2024

== Games of the Future 2024 ==
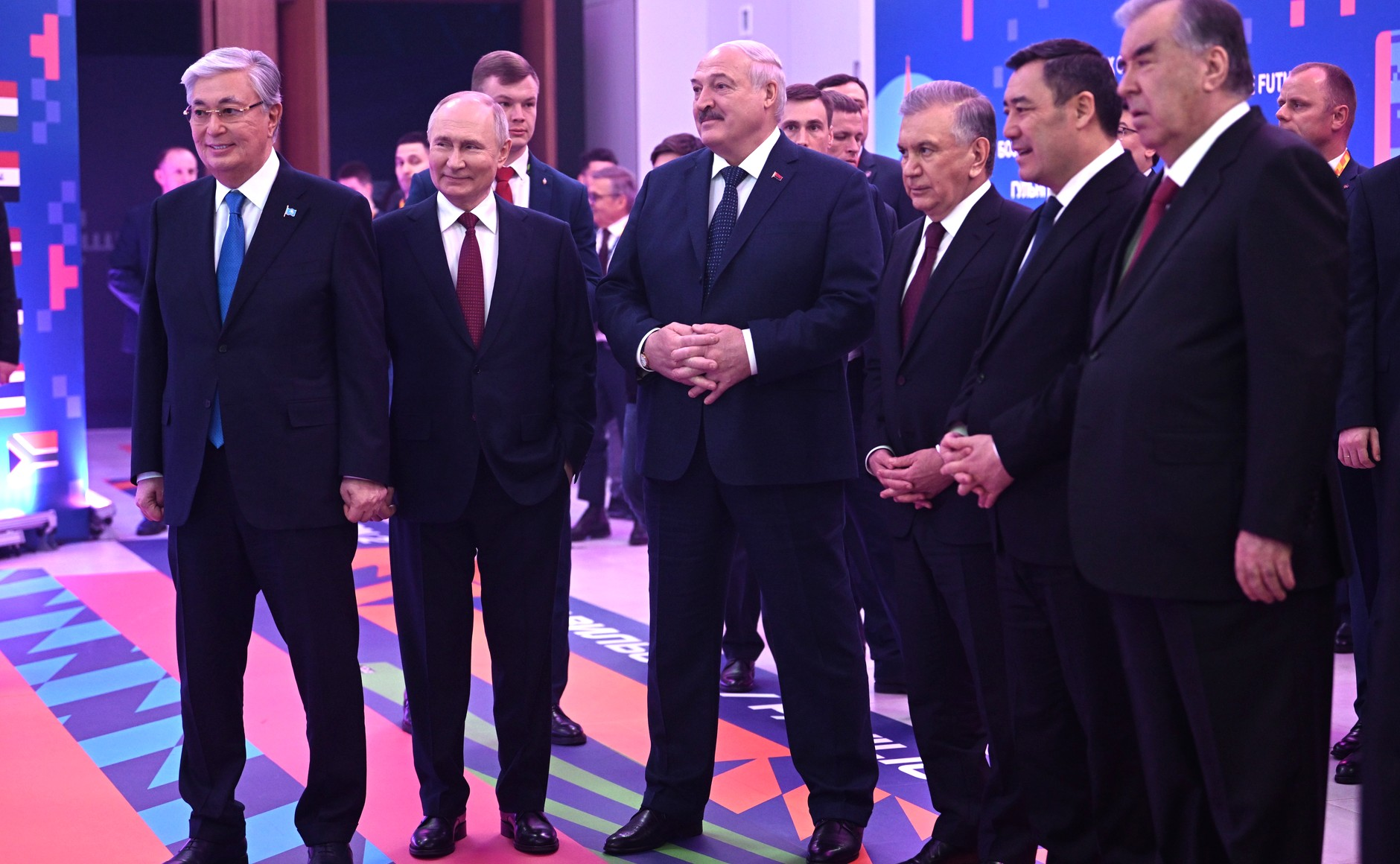
Kassym-Jomart Tokayev, Vladimir Putin, Alexander Lukashenko, Shavkat Mirziyoyev, Sadyr Japarov, Emomali Rahmon at the opening ceremony of the 2024 Games of the Future

The tournament was held from February 21 to March 3, 2024 in Kazan, Russia. Over 260 teams and over 2000 athletes from different countries participated in the tournament in 21 disciplines (16 in the main program and 5 in the extended program) based on a combination of physical activity, modern technology and digital environments, and players met in five areas ranging from sports to technology. There were 10 qualifiers for the tournament, the Phygital Games.

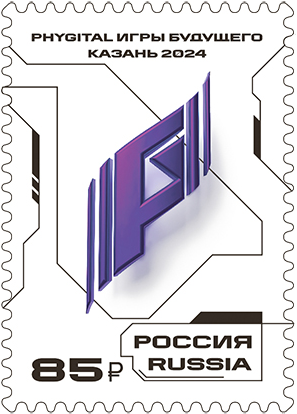
Russian Post postal mark dedicated to the tournament

On February 21, 2024, the opening ceremony of the tournament was held, attended by Presidents of Russia, President of Belarus, Kazakhstan, Tajikistan, Uzbekistan and Kyrgyzstan.

=== Concerns and controversies ===
Several teams have rejected the invitation to participate in the Games due to concerns of personal data being misused. Nigma Galaxy withdrew from the tournament due to fears of being banned from official Valve tournaments. United States Senator Mitt Romney voiced concern about Russia's growing influence in esports.

=== Ranking ===
Partial list of winners of the Games of the Future 2024:

List of winners

Virtual cycling

1. Minsk (BEL), 522 points — Yauhen Sobal, Taisa Naskovich, Anna Terekh, Mikhail Shemetau
2. Marathon-Tula (RUS), 469 points — Gulnaz Khatuntseva, Diana Klimova, Sergey Rostovtsev, Pyotr Rikunov
3. Italian Espresso (ITA), 425 points

Mobile Legends: Bang Bang

1. AP.Bren (PHI)
2. ONIC (INA)
3. Fire Flux Esports (TUR)

Phygital Hockey

1. Liga Pro Team (RUS)
2. COSMOS X17 (RUS)
3. Ak Bars (RUS)

Phygital Football

1. Penarol (URY)
2. Lokomotiv Moscow (RUS)
3. Mexico Quetzales (MEX)

E-Athletics

1. Russian Cyborgs (RUS)
2. Falcon Verts (KSA)
3. Pharaohs (EGY)

Phygital MMA

1. Kuznya (RUS) — 32 points
2. GOR Union (Multinational) — 30 points
3. MMA Fighters (ARM) — 27 points

Warface + Laser tag

1. Young (RUS)
2. HLS (RUS)
3. Winstrike (RUS)

Dota 2

1. Xtreme Gaming (CHN)
2. LGD Gaming (CHN)
3. Invictus Gaming (CHN)

Show Match Super finals — Entity Gaming.

Beat Saber

1. Ivan IlluminatiSalad Kosnikov
2. Erik kip Niyazov
3. Mikhail DRO3D_RUS Stepanyuk

Standoff 2 + Laser tag

1. Absolute (RUS)
2. SaiNts (RUS)
3. forZe Esports (RUS)

Phygital Skateboarding

1. Latino Gang (ARG)
2. Hustlers (EUR)
3. Slugs (RUS)

World of Tanks

1. Beyond (RUS)
2. Enemy (RUS)
3. Solnce

Battle of the Robots

1. DS ROBOTICS (IND)
2. Daddy Boys (RUS)
3. TurboMeKhatroniki (RUS).

Counter-Strike 2 + Laser tag

1. XGod (KAZ)
2. Looking for Org (RUS)
3. HOTU (RUS)

Sports programming

1. Fyodor Romashov (RUS)
2. Alexander Babin (RUS)
3. Kirill Kudryashov (RUS)

Phygital Basketball

1. Liga Pro Team (RUS)
2. R10 Team USA (USA)
3. URAL BASKET (RUS)

Drone racing

1. Team Min’s Korea (ROK)
2. Flat-Out (BUL)
3. DRD (RUS)

== Games of the Future 2025 ==
On June 1, 2024 at the first-ever World Phygital Summit held in Istanbul it was announced that the second international multi-sport tournament in the concept of phygital sports, 2025 Games of the Future, will be held in the United Arab Emirates. Beating nine prospective bidders, the UAE has won the bid to host the Games of the Future 2025.

On December 9, 2024, it was announced that the Games of the Future 2025 would start on November 21.

On August 7, 2025 it was announced that the Games of the Future 2025 will have total prizes of $5 million. Athletes competed across 11 disciplines during six days, which were held at Abu Dhabi National Exhibition Center (ADNEC) in Abu Dhabi, from 18–23 December. Competitions were held in eleven different disciplines.

The Phygital Football Final had México Quetzales from Mexico beating King's League Club World Champions, Troncos FC, from Spain.

Discipline	Description	Prize pool
Phygital Fighting	Fighting video game + the bout in a physical arena	$500,000
Phygital Basketball	Basketball video game round + physical on-court action	$400,000
Phygital Football	Football video game + game on a pitch	$600,000
Phygital Shooter	Digital shooter round + round of laser tag	$150,000
Phygital Dancing	Live athletes' movements should complement an interactive rhythm video game	$50,000
MOBA PC	Multiplayer Online Battle Arena (MOBA) tournament played on PC	$1,000,000
MOBA Mobile	Multiplayer Online Battle Arena (MOBA) tournament played on mobile	$900,000
VR Games	Various virtual games that test reaction spee	$50,000
Battle of Robots	Remote-controlled robots come face-to-face in fast-paced encounter	$400,000
Battle Royale	Clubs fight to be the last club standing	$700,000
Drone Racing	High speed drones + obstacle course + pilots using first-person view (FPV) headsets	$250,000

== Games of the Future 2026 ==
The 2026 Games of the Future were held in Astana, Kazakhstan, from 18 July to 1 August 2026.

Three countries competed for the right to host this tournament. The initiative to hold the "Games of the Future" in Kazakhstan was proposed by President Kassym-Jomart Tokayev during the opening ceremony of the first games.

Astana was officially confirmed as the host city for the 2026 edition on July 14, 2025 during the official meeting of Oljas Bektenov, Prime Minister of the Republic of Kazakhstan, with leaders of Phygital International (promoter and rights holder of the Games of the Future): founder René Fasel and CEO Nis Hatt. The meeting was followed by a press conference, attended by Serik Zharasbayev, Vice Minister of Tourism and Sports of the Republic of Kazakhstan, Alibek Khassenov, President of Kazsportinvest JSC, and Nis Hatt, CEO of Phygital International.

The tournament included competitions in Phygital Football, Phygital Fighting, Phygital Basketball, Phygital Dancing, Phygital Hockey, Phygital Shooter, Phygital Battle Royale, MOBA 1 and MOBA 2, Phygital Drone Racing, Battle Bots, Phygital Boxing, Cybathletics, with prizes totalling $10 million.

== See also ==
- List of hybrid sports
