= 2023 World Wrestling Championships – Men's Greco-Roman 60 kg =

Wrestling competitions

Men's Greco-Roman 60 kg at the 2023 World Championships
- Venue: Štark Arena
- Dates: 22–23 September 2023
- Competitors: 40 from 36 nations

Medalists
gold medal	Zholaman Sharshenbekov	Kyrgyzstan
silver medal	Kenichiro Fumita	Japan
bronze medal	Cao Liguo	China
bronze medal	Islomjon Bakhromov	Uzbekistan

The men's Greco-Roman 60 kilograms is a competition featured at the 2023 World Wrestling Championships, and was held in Belgrade, Serbia on 22 and 23 September 2023.

This freestyle wrestling competition consists of a single-elimination tournament, with a repechage used to determine the winner of two bronze medals. The two finalists face off for gold and silver medals. Each wrestler who loses to one of the two finalists moves into the repechage, culminating in a pair of bronze medal matches featuring the semifinal losers each facing the remaining repechage opponent from their half of the bracket.

== Results ==
Legend

- WO — Won by walkover

=== Finals ===
Semifinals		Final
Gevorg Gharibyan (ARM)	1
Kenichiro Fumita (JPN)	5	Kenichiro Fumita (JPN)	6
Mehdi Mohsennejad (IRI)	3	Zholaman Sharshenbekov (KGZ)	11
Zholaman Sharshenbekov (KGZ)	4

=== Top half ===
==== Section 1 ====
Round of 64
Ibrahim Bunduka (SLE)	WO
~~Erik Torba (HUN)~~
Aleksandrs Jurkjans (LAT)	0
Jacopo Sandron (ITA)	9

Round of 32
Edmond Nazaryan (BUL)	0
Gevorg Gharibyan (ARM)	9
Michał Tracz (POL)	9
Ibrahim Bunduka (SLE)	0
Jacopo Sandron (ITA)	9
Bajram Sina (ALB)	0
Kevin de Armas (CUB)	2
Nihat Mammadli (AZE)	6

Round of 16
Gevorg Gharibyan (ARM)	3
Michał Tracz (POL)	1
Jacopo Sandron (ITA)	0
Nihat Mammadli (AZE)	8

Quarterfinals
Gevorg Gharibyan (ARM)	3
Nihat Mammadli (AZE)	1

==== Section 2 ====
Round of 64
Victor Ciobanu (MDA)	1
Kenichiro Fumita (JPN)	3
Léo Tudezca (FRA)	8
Jeremy Peralta (ECU)	0

Round of 32
Răzvan Arnăut (ROU)	8
Manish Kundu (UWW)	8
Helary Mägisalu (EST)	1
Kenichiro Fumita (JPN)	5
Léo Tudezca (FRA)	9
Latuf Madi (COM)	0
Melkamu Fetene (ISR)	1
Cao Liguo (CHN)	5

Round of 16
Manish Kundu (UWW)	1
Kenichiro Fumita (JPN)	6
Léo Tudezca (FRA)	4
Cao Liguo (CHN)	6

Quarterfinals
Kenichiro Fumita (JPN)	3
Cao Liguo (CHN)	1

=== Bottom half ===
==== Section 3 ====
Round of 64
Aslamjon Azizov (TJK)	3
Raiber Rodríguez (VEN)	3
Dicther Toro (COL)	1
Olzhas Sultan (KAZ)	1

Round of 32
Kerem Kamal (TUR)	5
Anvar Allakhiarov (AIN)	11
Christopher Kraemer (GER)	9
Aslamjon Azizov (TJK)	1
Olzhas Sultan (KAZ)	0
Kim Seung-hak (KOR)	9
Ildar Hafizov (USA)	0
Mehdi Mohsennejad (IRI)	7

Round of 16
Anvar Allakhiarov (AIN)	5
Christopher Kraemer (GER)	7
Kim Seung-hak (KOR)	2
Mehdi Mohsennejad (IRI)	4

Quarterfinals
Christopher Kraemer (GER)	0
Mehdi Mohsennejad (IRI)	7

==== Section 4 ====
Round of 64
Jamal Valizadeh (UWW)	0
Hleb Makaranka (AIN)	11
Samuel Gurria (MEX)	6
Alexander Bica (SWE)	2

Round of 32
Haithem Mahmoud (EGY)	1
Islomjon Bakhromov (UZB)	10
Viktor Petryk (UKR)	1
Hleb Makaranka (AIN)	2
Samuel Gurria (MEX)	2
Pridon Abuladze (GEO)	10
Justas Petravičius (LTU)	2
Zholaman Sharshenbekov (KGZ)	10

Round of 16
Islomjon Bakhromov (UZB)	9
Hleb Makaranka (AIN)	0
Pridon Abuladze (GEO)	0
Zholaman Sharshenbekov (KGZ)	9

Quarterfinals
Islomjon Bakhromov (UZB)	0
Zholaman Sharshenbekov (KGZ)	10

=== Repechage ===
Repechage round 1
Victor Ciobanu (MDA)	5
Helary Mägisalu (EST)	3

Repechage round 2
Victor Ciobanu (MDA)	9
Manish Kundu (UWW)	0
Justas Petravičius (LTU)	1
Pridon Abuladze (GEO)	2

Repechage round 3
Victor Ciobanu (MDA)	7
Cao Liguo (CHN)	9
Pridon Abuladze (GEO)	4
Islomjon Bakhromov (UZB)	7

Bronze medals
Cao Liguo (CHN)	5
Gevorg Gharibyan (ARM)	3
Islomjon Bakhromov (UZB)	3
Mehdi Mohsennejad (IRI)	3

Olympic wrestle-off
Gevorg Gharibyan (ARM)	0
Mehdi Mohsennejad (IRI)	7

== Final standing ==
Rank	Athlete
1st place, gold medalist(s)	Zholaman Sharshenbekov (KGZ)
2nd place, silver medalist(s)	Kenichiro Fumita (JPN)
3rd place, bronze medalist(s)	Cao Liguo (CHN)
3rd place, bronze medalist(s)	Islomjon Bakhromov (UZB)
5	Mehdi Mohsennejad (IRI)
5	Gevorg Gharibyan (ARM)
7	Léo Tudezca (FRA)
8	Victor Ciobanu (MDA)
9	Jacopo Sandron (ITA)
10	Pridon Abuladze (GEO)
11	Nihat Mammadli (AZE)
12	Christopher Kraemer (GER)
13	Hleb Makaranka (AIN)
14	Kim Seung-hak (KOR)
15	Michał Tracz (POL)
16	Ibrahim Bunduka (SLE)
17	Anvar Allakhiarov (AIN)
18	Manish Kundu (UWW)
19	Samuel Gurria (MEX)
20	Aslamjon Azizov (TJK)
21	Olzhas Sultan (KAZ)
22	Helary Mägisalu (EST)
23	Justas Petravičius (LTU)
24	Răzvan Arnăut (ROU)
25	Kerem Kamal (TUR)
26	Raiber Rodríguez (VEN)
27	Kevin de Armas (CUB)
28	Alexander Bica (SWE)
29	Dicther Toro (COL)
30	Viktor Petryk (UKR)
31	Melkamu Fetene (ISR)
32	Haithem Mahmoud (EGY)
33	Ildar Hafizov (USA)
34	Jeremy Peralta (ECU)
35	Edmond Nazaryan (BUL)
36	Aleksandrs Jurkjans (LAT)
37	Bajram Sina (ALB)
38	Latuf Madi (COM)
39	Jamal Valizadeh (UWW)
—	Erik Torba (HUN)

Qualified for the 2024 Summer Olympics
