= 2026 World Wrestling Championships – Men's Greco-Roman 60 kg =

Wrestling competitions

Men's Greco-Roman 60 kg at the 2026 World Championships
- Venue: Barys Arena
- Dates: 24–25 October 2026
- Competitors: 24 from 23 nations

Medalists
gold medal	Koto Gomi	Japan
silver medal	Ali Ahmadi Vafa	Iran
bronze medal	Alisher Ganiev	Uzbekistan
bronze medal	Aidos Sultangali	Kazakhstan

The men's Greco-Roman 60 kilograms is a competition featured at the 2026 World Wrestling Championships, and was held in Astana, Kazakhstan on 24 and 25 October 2026.

This Greco-Roman wrestling competition consists of a single-elimination tournament, with a repechage used to determine the winner of two bronze medals. The two finalists face off for gold and silver medals. Each wrestler who loses to one of the two finalists moves into the repechage, culminating in a pair of bronze medal matches, featuring the semifinal losers each facing the remaining repechage opponent from their half of the bracket.

== Results ==
Legend

- F — Won by fall

=== Final ===
Final
Ali Ahmadi Vafa (IRI)	7
Koto Gomi (JPN)	5^{F}

=== Top half ===
Round of 32
Justas Petravičius (LTU)	4
Lucas Lo Grasso (FRA)	3
Harsh (IND)	0
Kurmanbek Zhaparov (KGZ)	9
Abdolmohammad Papi (GER)	11
Aslamjon Azizov (TJK)	0
Răzvan Arnăut (ROU)	9
Kim Da-hyun (KOR)	0

Round of 16
Alisher Ganiev (UZB)	8
Justas Petravičius (LTU)	0
Kurmanbek Zhaparov (KGZ)	8^{F}
Abdelkarim Fergat (ALG)	3
Ali Ahmadi Vafa (IRI)	9
Abdolmohammad Papi (GER)	1
Răzvan Arnăut (ROU)	9
Dalton Roberts (USA)	0

Quarterfinals
Alisher Ganiev (UZB)	13
Kurmanbek Zhaparov (KGZ)	4
Ali Ahmadi Vafa (IRI)	8
Răzvan Arnăut (ROU)	0

Semifinals
Alisher Ganiev (UZB)	3
Ali Ahmadi Vafa (IRI)	8

=== Bottom half ===
Round of 32
Anvar Allakhiarov (RUS)	8
Jamal Valizadeh (EOR)	0
Murad Mammadov (AZE)	6
Enes Başar (TUR)	3
Suren Aghajanyan (ARM)	9
Dimitri Khachidze (GEO)	6
Vladyslav Kuzko (UKR)	1
Cao Liguo (CHN)	2

Round of 16
Aidos Sultangali (KAZ)	4
Anvar Allakhiarov (RUS)	3
Murad Mammadov (AZE)	11
Mahmoud Farrag Saad (EGY)	0
Koto Gomi (JPN)	12
Suren Aghajanyan (ARM)	4
Cao Liguo (CHN)	3
Georgii Tibilov (SRB)	3

Quarterfinals
Aidos Sultangali (KAZ)	4
Murad Mammadov (AZE)	1
Koto Gomi (JPN)	7
Cao Liguo (CHN)	1

Semifinals
Aidos Sultangali (KAZ)	1
Koto Gomi (JPN)	5

=== Repechage ===
Repechage round 2
Abdolmohammad Papi (GER)	6
Răzvan Arnăut (ROU)	5
Suren Aghajanyan (ARM)	2
Cao Liguo (CHN)	2

Bronze medals
Abdolmohammad Papi (GER)	0
Alisher Ganiev (UZB)	10
Cao Liguo (CHN)	1
Aidos Sultangali (KAZ)	5

== Final standing ==
Rank	Athlete
1st place, gold medalist(s)	Koto Gomi (JPN)
2nd place, silver medalist(s)	Ali Ahmadi Vafa (IRI)
3rd place, bronze medalist(s)	Alisher Ganiev (UZB)
3rd place, bronze medalist(s)	Aidos Sultangali (KAZ)
5	Abdolmohammad Papi (GER)
5	Cao Liguo (CHN)
7	Kurmanbek Zhaparov (KGZ)
8	Răzvan Arnăut (ROU)
9	Murad Mammadov (AZE)
10	Anvar Allakhiarov (RUS)
11	Suren Aghajanyan (ARM)
12	Justas Petravičius (LTU)
13	Dimitri Khachidze (GEO)
14	Georgii Tibilov (SRB)
15	Lucas Lo Grasso (FRA)
16	Enes Başar (TUR)
17	Vladyslav Kuzko (UKR)
18	Abdelkarim Fergat (ALG)
19	Jamal Valizadeh (EOR)
20	Dalton Roberts (USA)
21	Harsh (IND)
22	Kim Da-hyun (KOR)
23	Mahmoud Farrag Saad (EGY)
24	Aslamjon Azizov (TJK)
