= 2025 World Wrestling Championships – Men's Greco-Roman 60 kg =

Wrestling competitions

Men's Greco-Roman 60 kg at the 2025 World Championships
- Venue: Arena Zagreb
- Dates: 19–20 September 2025
- Competitors: 25 from 23 nations

Medalists
| gold medal | Aidos Sultangali | Kazakhstan |
| silver medal | Alisher Ganiev | Uzbekistan |
| bronze medal | Ri Se-ung | North Korea |
| bronze medal | Hrachya Poghosyan | Armenia |

The men's Greco-Roman 60 kilograms is a competition featured at the 2025 World Wrestling Championships, and was held in Zagreb, Croatia on 19 and 20 September 2025.

This Greco-Roman wrestling competition consists of a single-elimination tournament, with a repechage used to determine the winner of two bronze medals. The two finalists face off for gold and silver medals. Each wrestler who loses to one of the two finalists moves into the repechage, culminating in a pair of bronze medal matches, featuring the semifinal losers each facing the remaining repechage opponent from their half of the bracket.

== Results ==
Legend

- F — Won by fall
- WO — Won by walkover

=== Final ===
| Final |
| Aidos Sultangali (KAZ) | 9 |
| Alisher Ganiev (UZB) | 0 |

=== Top half ===
Round of 32
Kaito Inaba (JPN) | 5
Ali Ahmadi Vafa (IRI) | 5
Jamal Valizadeh (UWW) | 0
Melkamu Fetene (ISR) | 11^{F}
Aidos Sultangali (KAZ) | 7
Maxwell Black (USA) | 1
Akyl Sulaimanov (KGZ) | 10
Justas Petravičius (LTU) | 0
Marat Garipov (BRA) | 0
Wu Huangsheng (CHN) | 10

Round of 16
Ri Se-ung (PRK) | 8
Kaito Inaba (JPN) | 0
Melkamu Fetene (ISR) | 2
Aidos Sultangali (KAZ) | 11
Enes Başar (TUR) | 7
Akyl Sulaimanov (KGZ) | 4
Wu Huangsheng (CHN) | 0
Amiran Shavadze (GEO) | 9

Quarterfinals
Ri Se-ung (PRK) | 1
Aidos Sultangali (KAZ) | 1
Enes Başar (TUR) | 0
Amiran Shavadze (GEO) | 10

Semifinals
Aidos Sultangali (KAZ) | 10
Amiran Shavadze (GEO) | 2

=== Bottom half ===
Round of 32
Dovudzhon Toshev (UWW) | 0
Abdelkarim Fergat (ALG) | 9
Hrachya Poghosyan (ARM) | 9
Vladyslav Kuzko (UKR) | 0
Ángel Segura (MEX) | 1
Suraj Vashisht (IND) | 3
Kim Da-hyun (KOR) | 0
Olivier Skrzypczak (POL) | 6

Round of 16
Nihat Mammadli (AZE) | 8
Abdelkarim Fergat (ALG) | 0
Hrachya Poghosyan (ARM) | 0
Alisher Ganiev (UZB) | 8
Victor Ciobanu (MDA) | 1
Suraj Vashisht (IND) | 3
Olivier Skrzypczak (POL) | 0
Georgii Tibilov (SRB) | 8

Quarterfinals
Nihat Mammadli (AZE) | 4
Alisher Ganiev (UZB) | 8
Suraj Vashisht (IND) | 1
Georgii Tibilov (SRB) | 4

Semifinals
Alisher Ganiev (UZB) | 5
Georgii Tibilov (SRB) | 5

=== Repechage ===
Repechage round 1
Maxwell Black (USA) | 5
Melkamu Fetene (ISR) | 1

Repechage round 2
Maxwell Black (USA) | 0
Ri Se-ung (PRK) | 9
Hrachya Poghosyan (ARM) | WO
Nihat Mammadli (AZE)

Bronze medals
Ri Se-ung (PRK) | 9^{F}
Amiran Shavadze (GEO) | 0
Hrachya Poghosyan (ARM) | 1
Georgii Tibilov (SRB) | 1

== Final standing ==
| Rank | Athlete |
|---|---|
| 1st place, gold medalist(s) | Aidos Sultangali (KAZ) |
| 2nd place, silver medalist(s) | Alisher Ganiev (UZB) |
| 3rd place, bronze medalist(s) | Ri Se-ung (PRK) |
| 3rd place, bronze medalist(s) | Hrachya Poghosyan (ARM) |
| 5 | Amiran Shavadze (GEO) |
| 5 | Georgii Tibilov (SRB) |
| 7 | Melkamu Fetene (ISR) |
| 8 | Suraj Vashisht (IND) |
| 9 | Akyl Sulaimanov (KGZ) |
| 10 | Nihat Mammadli (AZE) |
| 11 | Wu Huangsheng (CHN) |
| 12 | Abdelkarim Fergat (ALG) |
| 13 | Maxwell Black (USA) |
| 14 | Enes Başar (TUR) |
| 15 | Olivier Skrzypczak (POL) |
| 16 | Kaito Inaba (JPN) |
| 17 | Ali Ahmadi Vafa (IRI) |
| 18 | Ángel Segura (MEX) |
| 19 | Kim Da-hyun (KOR) |
| 20 | Dovudzhon Toshev (UWW) |
| 21 | Vladyslav Kuzko (UKR) |
| 22 | Justas Petravičius (LTU) |
| 23 | Marat Garipov (BRA) |
| 24 | Jamal Valizadeh (UWW) |
| DQ | Victor Ciobanu (MDA) |

- Victor Ciobanu of Moldovia originally finished 18th, but was disqualified.
