= Islomjon Bakhromov =

Uzbekistani Greco-Roman wrestler

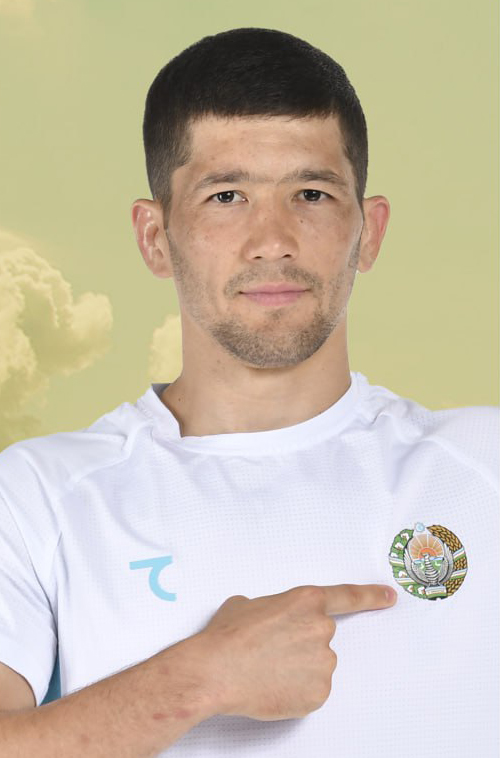

Personal information
- Born: 17 July 1995 (age 30)

Sport
- Country: Uzbekistan
- Sport: Amateur wrestling
- Weight class: 60 kg
- Event: Greco-Roman
Medal record
Men's Greco-Roman wrestling
Representing Uzbekistan
World Championships
| Bronze medal – third place | 2023 Belgrade | 60 kg |
Asian Championships
| Gold medal – first place | 2019 Xi'an | 60 kg |
| Bronze medal – third place | 2018 Bishkek | 60 kg |
| Bronze medal – third place | 2020 New Delhi | 60 kg |
Islamic Solidarity Games
| Silver medal – second place | 2017 Baku | 59 kg |
Asian Indoor and Martial Arts Games
| Bronze medal – third place | 2017 Ashgabat | 59 kg |

Islomjon Bakhromov (born 17 July 1995) is an Uzbekistani Greco-Roman wrestler. He won one of the bronze medals in the 60 kg event at the 2023 World Wrestling Championships held in Belgrade, Serbia. He represented Uzbekistan at the 2024 Summer Olympics in Paris, France.

In 2019, Bakhromov won the gold medal in his event at the Asian Wrestling Championships held in Xi'an, China.

== Career ==
At the 2017 Asian Indoor and Martial Arts Games held in Ashgabat, Turkmenistan, he won one of the bronze medals in the 59 kg event.

In 2018, Bakhromov competed in the 60 kg event at the Asian Games in Jakarta, Indonesia where he lost his bronze medal match against Mehrdad Mardani of Iran.

In 2021, Bakhromov won the gold medal in the 60 kg event at the Grand Prix Zagreb Open held in Zagreb, Croatia. In 2022, he won the gold medal in the 63 kg event at the Vehbi Emre & Hamit Kaplan Tournament held in Istanbul, Turkey.

He lost his bronze medal match in the 60 kg event at the 2022 Asian Games held in Hangzhou, China.

Bakhromov competed in the 60 kg event at the 2024 Summer Olympics held in Paris, France. He was eliminated in his second match by Ri Se-ung of North Korea. Ri Se-ung went on to win one of the bronze medals in the event.

== Achievements ==
| Year | Tournament | Location | Result | Event |
|---|---|---|---|---|
| 2017 | Islamic Solidarity Games | Baku, Azerbaijan | 2nd | Greco-Roman 59 kg |
| 2017 | Asian Indoor and Martial Arts Games | Ashgabat, Turkmenistan | 3rd | Greco-Roman 59 kg |
| 2018 | Asian Championships | Bishkek, Kyrgyzstan | 3rd | Greco-Roman 60 kg |
| 2019 | Asian Championships | Xi'an, China | 1st | Greco-Roman 60 kg |
| 2020 | Asian Championships | New Delhi, India | 3rd | Greco-Roman 60 kg |
| 2023 | World Championships | Belgrade, Serbia | 3rd | Greco-Roman 60 kg |
