= 2018 World Wrestling Championships – Men's Greco-Roman 60 kg =

Men's Greco-Roman 60 kg at the 2018 World Championships
- Venue: László Papp Budapest Sports Arena
- Dates: 26–27 October 2018
- Competitors: 31 from 31 nations

Medalists
gold medal	Sergey Emelin	Russia
silver medal	Victor Ciobanu	Moldova
bronze medal	Walihan Sailike	China
bronze medal	Aidos Sultangali	Kazakhstan

The men's Greco-Roman 60 kilograms is a competition featured at the 2018 World Wrestling Championships, and was held in Budapest, Hungary on 26 and 27 October.

This Greco-Roman wrestling competition consists of a single-elimination tournament, with a repechage used to determine the winner of two bronze medals. The two finalists face off for gold and silver medals. Each wrestler who loses to one of the two finalists moves into the repechage, culminating in a pair of bronze medal matches featuring the semifinal losers each facing the remaining repechage opponent from their half of the bracket.

== Results ==
Legend

- F — Won by fall

=== Final ===
Final
Victor Ciobanu (MDA)	1
Sergey Emelin (RUS)	10

=== Top half ===
Round of 32
Ivan Lizatović (CRO)	0
Firuz Tukhtaev (UZB)	9
Justas Petravičius (LTU)	8
Gyanender Dahiya (IND)	0
Kristijan Fris (SRB)	9^{F}
Lauri Mähönen (FIN)	0
Dalton Roberts (USA)	0
Etienne Kinsinger (GER)	11
Erik Torba (HUN)	3
Victor Ciobanu (MDA)	3
Kerem Kamal (TUR)	5
Walihan Sailike (CHN)	7
Marat Garipov (BRA)	4
Przemysław Piątek (POL)	7

Round of 16
Luis Orta (CUB)	8
Firuz Tukhtaev (UZB)	4
Justas Petravičius (LTU)	2
Kristijan Fris (SRB)	7
Etienne Kinsinger (GER)	1
Victor Ciobanu (MDA)	8
Walihan Sailike (CHN)	4^{F}
Przemysław Piątek (POL)	1

Quarterfinals
Luis Orta (CUB)	1
Kristijan Fris (SRB)	7^{F}
Victor Ciobanu (MDA)	6
Walihan Sailike (CHN)	6

Semifinals
Kristijan Fris (SRB)	3
Victor Ciobanu (MDA)	6

=== Bottom half ===
Round of 32
Sergey Emelin (RUS)	9
Maksim Kazharski (BLR)	0
Ivo Angelov (BUL)	2
Haithem Mahmoud (EGY)	7
Dato Chkhartishvili (GEO)	1
Ri Se-ung (PRK)	11
Gevorg Gharibyan (ARM)	8
Andrés González (PAN)	0
Kim Seung-hak (KOR)	0
Andrés Montaño (ECU)	8
Murad Mammadov (AZE)	8
Kaly Sulaimanov (KGZ)	5^{F}
Shinobu Ota (JPN)	9
Mehrdad Mardani (IRI)	1
Dmytro Tsymbaliuk (UKR)	1
Aidos Sultangali (KAZ)	6

Round of 16
Sergey Emelin (RUS)	9
Haithem Mahmoud (EGY)	0
Ri Se-ung (PRK)	5
Gevorg Gharibyan (ARM)	1
Andrés Montaño (ECU)	0
Kaly Sulaimanov (KGZ)	9
Shinobu Ota (JPN)	5
Aidos Sultangali (KAZ)	7

Quarterfinals
Sergey Emelin (RUS)	7
Ri Se-ung (PRK)	0
Kaly Sulaimanov (KGZ)	1
Aidos Sultangali (KAZ)	9

Semifinals
Sergey Emelin (RUS)	9
Aidos Sultangali (KAZ)	0

=== Repechage ===
Repechage round 1
Erik Torba (HUN)	3
Etienne Kinsinger (GER)	5
Maksim Kazharski (BLR)	5
Haithem Mahmoud (EGY)	1

Repechage round 2
Etienne Kinsinger (GER)	0
Walihan Sailike (CHN)	4
Maksim Kazharski (BLR)	6
Ri Se-ung (PRK)	9

Bronze medals
Walihan Sailike (CHN)	9
Kristijan Fris (SRB)	0
Ri Se-ung (PRK)	1
Aidos Sultangali (KAZ)	1
