= 2017 World Wrestling Championships – Men's Greco-Roman 59 kg =

Men's Greco-Roman 59 kg at the 2017 World Championships
- Venue: AccorHotels Arena
- Dates: 22 August 2017
- Competitors: 30 from 30 nations

Medalists
gold medal	Kenichiro Fumita	Japan
silver medal	Meirambek Ainagulov	Kazakhstan
bronze medal	Stepan Maryanyan	Russia
bronze medal	Kim Seung-hak	South Korea

The men's Greco-Roman 59 kilograms is a competition featured at the 2017 World Wrestling Championships, and was held in Paris, France on 22 August 2017.

This Greco-Roman wrestling competition consisted of a single-elimination tournament, with a repechage used to determine the winners of two bronze medals.

== Results ==
Legend

- F — Won by fall

=== Final ===
Final
Kenichiro Fumita (JPN)	2
Meirambek Ainagulov (KAZ)	1

=== Top half ===
Round of 32
Léo Tudezca (FRA)	5
Victor Ciobanu (MDA)	7
Maksim Kazharski (BLR)	1
Taleh Mammadov (AZE)	2
Kenichiro Fumita (JPN)	5
Justas Petravičius (LTU)	2
Vazgen Khachatryan (ARM)	8
Ildar Hafizov (USA)	3
Etienne Kinsinger (GER)	2
Stepan Maryanyan (RUS)	2
Lasha Mariamidze (GEO)	2
Erik Torba (HUN)	10

Round of 16
Stig-André Berge (NOR)	1
Kanybek Zholchubekov (KGZ)	3
Victor Ciobanu (MDA)	9
Taleh Mammadov (AZE)	12
Kenichiro Fumita (JPN)	8
Vazgen Khachatryan (ARM)	0
Stepan Maryanyan (RUS)	4^{F}
Erik Torba (HUN)	0

Quarterfinals
Kanybek Zholchubekov (KGZ)	3
Taleh Mammadov (AZE)	2
Kenichiro Fumita (JPN)	4
Stepan Maryanyan (RUS)	2

Semifinals
Kanybek Zholchubekov (KGZ)	1
Kenichiro Fumita (JPN)	2

=== Bottom half ===
Round of 32
Cristóbal Torres (CHI)	0
Kim Seung-hak (KOR)	8
Yun Won-chol (PRK)	1
Ivan Lizatović (CRO)	2
Firuz Tukhtaev (UZB)	0
Mehrdad Mardani (IRI)	3
Dicther Toro (COL)	0
Hammet Rüstem (TUR)	5
Dmytro Tsymbaliuk (UKR)	2
Dawid Ersetic (POL)	1
Radoslav Vasilev (BUL)	1
Jancel Pimentel (DOM)	3
Gyanender Dahiya (IND)	4
Ding Libin (CHN)	1
Meirambek Ainagulov (KAZ)	4
Mostafa Hassan Mohamed (EGY)	1

Round of 16
Kim Seung-hak (KOR)	12
Ivan Lizatović (CRO)	6
Mehrdad Mardani (IRI)	5
Hammet Rüstem (TUR)	2
Dmytro Tsymbaliuk (UKR)	9
Jancel Pimentel (DOM)	0
Gyanender Dahiya (IND)	0
Meirambek Ainagulov (KAZ)	9

Quarterfinals
Kim Seung-hak (KOR)	12
Mehrdad Mardani (IRI)	6
Dmytro Tsymbaliuk (UKR)	5
Meirambek Ainagulov (KAZ)	7

Semifinals
Kim Seung-hak (KOR)	2
Meirambek Ainagulov (KAZ)	4

=== Repechage ===
Repechage round 1
Justas Petravičius (LTU)	6
Vazgen Khachatryan (ARM)	4
Mostafa Hassan Mohamed (EGY)	1
Gyanender Dahiya (IND)	3

Repechage round 2
Justas Petravičius (LTU)	0
Stepan Maryanyan (RUS)	9
Gyanender Dahiya (IND)	2
Dmytro Tsymbaliuk (UKR)	2

Bronze medals
Stepan Maryanyan (RUS)	10
Kanybek Zholchubekov (KGZ)	2
Dmytro Tsymbaliuk (UKR)	4
Kim Seung-hak (KOR)	8
