= Dinislam Bammatov =

Russian Greco-Roman wrestler

Dinislam Bammatov Динислам Бамматов
Personal information
- Native name: Russian: Динислам Хизриевич Бамматов
- Full name: Dinislam Khizrievich Bammatov
- Nationality: (Russia) Russian
- Born: 24 October 2001 (age 25) Nizhneye Kazanishche, Buynaksky District, Dagestan, Russia

Sport
- Country: Russia
- Sport: Wrestling
- Weight class: 60kg
- Rank: International Master of sports
- Event: Greco-Roman
- Club: Olympic training center #2 (Saint Petersburg, Russia)
- Coached by: Sergey Kovalenko; Gregory Davidyan; Karimzhon Kazakov; Andrey Kamarov
Medal record
Men's Greco-Roman
Representing United World Wrestling
Grand Prix
Bronze medal – third place	2025 Budapest	63 kg
Representing Individual Neutral Athletes
Grand Prix
Gold medal – first place	2025 Zagreb	63 kg
U23 World Championships
Silver medal – second place	2024 Tirana	60 kg
U23 European Championships
Bronze medal – third place	2024 Baku	60 kg
Representing Russia
CIS Games
Gold medal – first place	2021 Kazan	60 kg
Junior World Championships
Gold medal – first place	2021 Ufa	60 kg
Junior European Championships
Silver medal – second place	2021 Dortmund	60 kg

Dinislam Khizrievich Bammatov (Russian: Динислам Хизриевич Бамматов; born 24 October 2001) is a Russian Greco-Roman wrestler of Kumyk origin, who competes at 60 kilograms. 2023 senior Russian national champion. 2021 junior world champion and 2x time U23 Russian champion.

== Biography ==
Bammatov was born in Nizhneye Kazanishche village, Dagestan, Russia, into a Kumyk family. He started wrestling in the local wrestling club of Buglen. After high school he moved to Saint-Petersburg and represent this state in national championships.

== Sport career ==
He has the silver medal from the 2021 European Junior Championships together with the gold medal of the 2021 World Junior Championships. In September 2021, he won the 2021 CIS Games in Kazan. In April 2022, Dinislam was the winner of the U23 Russian nationals in Vladivostok at 60 kilos. In May 2022, he finished in first place at the first tournament of the Ivan Poddubny league. In the final match, he over world champion Sergey Emelin of Mordovia. In October 2022, he finished with the silver medal at the second tournament of the Ivan Poddubny league. In February 2023, he became senior Russian national champion. In May 2023, Bammatov competed at the Benur Pashayan's memorial in Yerevan, Armenia, where he took first place. At the Ljubomir Ivanovic Gedza Memorial held in Serbia in August 2023, he won the bronze medal. In April 2024, Bammatov won the U23 Russian championships for the second time. In October 2024, he was finalist of the U23 World Championships in Albania.

== Achievements ==
Year	Tournament	Location	Result	Event
2021	Junior European Championships	Dortmund, Germany	2nd	Greco-Roman 60 kg
2021	Junior World Championships	Ufa, Russia	1st	Greco-Roman 60 kg
2021	CIS Games	Kazan, Russia	1st	Greco-Roman 60 kg
2023	Russian Championships	Ufa, Russia	1st	Greco-Roman 60 kg

== Personal life ==
He lives and trains in Saint Petersburg, Russia.
