= Wrestling at the 2022 Asian Games – Men's Greco-Roman 60 kg =

Men's Greco-Roman 60 kg at the 2022 Asian Games
- Venue: Lin'an Sports and Culture Centre
- Date: 4 October 2023
- Competitors: 16 from 16 nations

Medalists
gold medal	Zholaman Sharshenbekov	Kyrgyzstan
silver medal	Ayata Suzuki	Japan
bronze medal	Chung Han-jae	South Korea
bronze medal	Ri Se-ung	North Korea

The men's Greco-Roman 60 kilograms wrestling competition at the 2022 Asian Games in Hangzhou was held on 4 October 2023 at the Lin'an Sports and Culture Centre.

This Greco-Roman wrestling competition consists of a single-elimination tournament, with a repechage used to determine the winner of two bronze medals. The two finalists face off for gold and silver medals. Each wrestler who loses to one of the two finalists moves into the repechage, culminating in a pair of bronze medal matches featuring the semifinal losers each facing the remaining repechage opponent from their half of the bracket.

== Schedule ==
All times are China Standard Time (UTC+08:00)

Date	Time	Event
Wednesday, 4 October 2023	10:00	1/8 finals
Wednesday, 4 October 2023	10:00	1/4 finals
Wednesday, 4 October 2023	10:00	Semifinals
Wednesday, 4 October 2023	10:00	Repechages
Wednesday, 4 October 2023	17:00	Finals

== Results ==
Legend

- F — Won by fall

=== Main bracket ===
1/8 finals
Cao Liguo (CHN)	8
Chray Pros (CAM)	0
Islomjon Bakhromov (UZB)	8
Bùi Tiến Hải (VIE)	0
Suparmanto (INA)	3
Chung Han-jae (KOR)	11
Zholaman Sharshenbekov (KGZ)	8
Aslamjon Azizov (TJK)	5
Aidos Sultangali (KAZ)	11
Huang Jui-chi (TPE)	1
Gyanender Dahiya (IND)	1
Meisam Dalkhani (IRI)	7
Thanwa Sutdi (THA)	0
Ayata Suzuki (JPN)	10
Arslanbek Zakirbaýew (TKM)	0
Ri Se-ung (PRK)	8

1/4 finals
Cao Liguo (CHN)	1
Islomjon Bakhromov (UZB)	3
Chung Han-jae (KOR)	0
Zholaman Sharshenbekov (KGZ)	9
Aidos Sultangali (KAZ)	4
Meisam Dalkhani (IRI)	2
Ayata Suzuki (JPN)	4
Ri Se-ung (PRK)	1

Semifinals
Islomjon Bakhromov (UZB)	0
Zholaman Sharshenbekov (KGZ)	11^{F}
Aidos Sultangali (KAZ)	0
Ayata Suzuki (JPN)	9

Gold medal match
Zholaman Sharshenbekov (KGZ)	7^{F}
Ayata Suzuki (JPN)	6

=== Repechage ===
Repechage round 1
Aslamjon Azizov (TJK)	0
Chung Han-jae (KOR)	9
Thanwa Sutdi (THA)	0
Ri Se-ung (PRK)	9

Bronze medal matches
Chung Han-jae (KOR)	5
Islomjon Bakhromov (UZB)	4
Ri Se-ung (PRK)	2
Aidos Sultangali (KAZ)	1

== Final standing ==
Rank	Athlete
1st place, gold medalist(s)	Zholaman Sharshenbekov (KGZ)
2nd place, silver medalist(s)	Ayata Suzuki (JPN)
3rd place, bronze medalist(s)	Chung Han-jae (KOR)
3rd place, bronze medalist(s)	Ri Se-ung (PRK)
5	Islomjon Bakhromov (UZB)
5	Aidos Sultangali (KAZ)
7	Cao Liguo (CHN)
8	Meisam Dalkhani (IRI)
9	Aslamjon Azizov (TJK)
10	Suparmanto (INA)
11	Gyanender Dahiya (IND)
12	Huang Jui-chi (TPE)
13	Chray Pros (CAM)
14	Bùi Tiến Hải (VIE)
15	Arslanbek Zakirbaýew (TKM)
16	Thanwa Sutdi (THA)
