= Wrestling at the 2024 Summer Olympics – Men's Greco-Roman 60 kg =

Men's Greco-Roman 60 kg at the Games of the XXXIII Olympiad
- Venue: Grand Palais Éphémère
- Date: 5–6 August 2024
- Competitors: 17 from 17 nations

Medalists
| 1st place, gold medalist(s) | | Kenichiro Fumita | Japan |
| 2nd place, silver medalist(s) | | Cao Liguo | China |
| 3rd place, bronze medalist(s) | | Zholaman Sharshenbekov | Kyrgyzstan |
| 3rd place, bronze medalist(s) | | Ri Se-ung | North Korea |

Men's Greco-Roman 60 kg competition at the 2024 Summer Olympics in Paris, France, took place on 5–6 August 2024 at the Grand Palais Éphémère in Champ de Mars.

== Background ==
This is the 24th appearance of the men's Greco-Roman bantamweight (60 kg) event, made the debut in 1924, and it has appeared in every games since then.

- 1924-1928: 58 kg
- 1932-1936: 56 kg
- 1948-1996: 57 kg
- 2000: 58 kg
- 2004-2012: 55 kg
- 2016: 59 kg
- 2020-current: 60 kg

Returned 2020 silver medalist Kenichiro Fumita won the event as an eventual champion by defeating Cao Liguo in the final, Kyrgyzstan's Jolaman Şarşenbekov alongside North Korea's Ri Se-ung won bronze medals respectively.

== Format ==
This Greco-Roman competition consists of a single-elimination tournament, with a repechage used to determine the winner of two bronze medals. The two finalists face off for gold and silver medals. Each wrestler who loses to one of the two finalists moves into the repechage, culminating in a pair of bronze medal matches featuring the semifinal losers each facing the remaining repechage opponent from their half of the bracket.

== Rules ==
A typical bout consists of two halves of three minutes each separated by a 30-second break. The two competitors compete on a mat, which is nine meters in diameter. Wrestlers try to score points by executing various legal maneuvers. Points ranging from one to five are awarded by the mat referee depending on the degree of difficulty of the maneuvers. Points are also awarded to the opponent in case of infractions such as illegal holds, passivity etc. A wrestler is automatically disqualified if three cautions are awarded during a bout. Forcing an opponent's shoulders to the mat results in an instant victory by fall.

During the course of a match, if a wrestler builds an 8-point advantage over the opponent, the bout is stopped and the leader is declared as the winner by technical superiority. The total scores are totaled at the end of the stipulated six-minute period, and the wrestler with the maximum points wins. In case of a tie, the wrestler who has scored the last point is declared the winner. A competitor might also be declared a winner if the opponent does not turn up or is medically unfit to compete.

== Qualification ==
Sixteen quota places were available with each nation restricted to a maximum of one spot.

- Five quota places were awarded at the 2023 World Wrestling Championships, which took place from the 16th to 24 September in Belgrade, Serbia.
- Two quotas awarded at Panama American qualifiers in Acapulco, Mexico
- Two quotas awarded at the Afro-Oceanian qualifiers in Alexandria, Egypt.
- Two quotas awarded at the European Qualifiers in Baku, Azerbaijan.
- Two quotas awarded at the Asian Qualifiers in Bishkek, Kyrgyzstan.
- Three quotas awarded at the World Qualifiers in Istanbul, Türkiye.
- One invitational Refugee Olympic Team place.

== Schedule ==
All times are Central European Time (UTC+02:00)

| Date | Time | Event |
|---|---|---|
| 5 August 2024 | 15:00 | Qualification rounds |
| 5 August 2024 | 21:00 | Semifinals |
| 6 August 2024 | 11:00 | Repechage |
| 6 August 2024 | 19:30 | Finals |

== Results ==
Legend

- F — Won by fall

=== Main bracket ===
Round of 32
Georgii Tibilov (SRB) | 7
Enes Başar (TUR) | 8

Round of 16
Zholaman Sharshenbekov (KGZ) | 6
Aidos Sultangali (KAZ) | 3
Enes Başar (TUR) | 2
Răzvan Arnăut (ROU) | 4
Mehdi Mohsennejad (IRI) | 9
Abdelkarim Fergat (ALG) | 0
Kevin de Armas (CUB) | 1
Kenichiro Fumita (JPN) | 11
Victor Ciobanu (MDA) | 3
Ri Se-ung (PRK) | 10^{F}
Jamal Valizadeh (EOR) | 0
Islomjon Bakhromov (UZB) | 9
Raiber Rodríguez (VEN) | 6
Murad Mammadov (AZE) | 5
Moamen Ahmed Mohamed (EGY) | 2
Cao Liguo (CHN) | 6

Quarterfinals
Zholaman Sharshenbekov (KGZ) | 9
Răzvan Arnăut (ROU) | 0
Mehdi Mohsennejad (IRI) | 0
Kenichiro Fumita (JPN) | 9
Ri Se-ung (PRK) | 9
Islomjon Bakhromov (UZB) | 0
Raiber Rodríguez (VEN) | 3
Cao Liguo (CHN) | 5

Semifinals
Zholaman Sharshenbekov (KGZ) | 3
Kenichiro Fumita (JPN) | 4
Ri Se-ung (PRK) | 3
Cao Liguo (CHN) | 3

Final
Kenichiro Fumita (JPN) | 4
Cao Liguo (CHN) | 1

=== Repechage ===
Repechage round 2
Kevin de Armas (CUB) | 1
Mehdi Mohsennejad (IRI) | 10
Moamen Ahmed Mohamed (EGY) | 1
Raiber Rodríguez (VEN) | 12

Bronze medal matches
Mehdi Mohsennejad (IRI) | 1
Zholaman Sharshenbekov (KGZ) | 3
Raiber Rodríguez (VEN) | 0
Ri Se-ung (PRK) | 8

== Final standing ==
| Rank | Athlete |
|---|---|
| 1st place, gold medalist(s) | Kenichiro Fumita (JPN) |
| 2nd place, silver medalist(s) | Cao Liguo (CHN) |
| 3rd place, bronze medalist(s) | Zholaman Sharshenbekov (KGZ) |
| 3rd place, bronze medalist(s) | Ri Se-ung (PRK) |
| 5 | Raiber Rodríguez (VEN) |
| 5 | Mehdi Mohsennejad (IRI) |
| 7 | Islomjon Bakhromov (UZB) |
| 8 | Enes Başar (TUR) |
| 9 | Răzvan Arnăut (ROU) |
| 10 | Moamen Ahmed Mohamed (EGY) |
| 11 | Kevin de Armas (CUB) |
| 12 | Georgii Tibilov (SRB) |
| 13 | Murad Mammadov (AZE) |
| 14 | Aidos Sultangali (KAZ) |
| 15 | Victor Ciobanu (MDA) |
| 16 | Abdelkarim Fergat (ALG) |
| 17 | Jamal Valizadeh (EOR) |
