= 2021 World Wrestling Championships – Men's Greco-Roman 60 kg =

Wrestling competitions

Men's Greco-Roman 60 kg at the 2021 World Championships
- Venue: Nye Jordal Amfi
- Dates: 8–9 October 2021
- Competitors: 19 from 19 nations

Medalists
gold medal	Victor Ciobanu	Moldova
silver medal	Zholaman Sharshenbekov	Kyrgyzstan
bronze medal	Stepan Maryanyan	RWF
bronze medal	Murad Mammadov	Azerbaijan

The men's Greco-Roman 60 kilograms is a competition featured at the 2021 World Wrestling Championships, and was held in Oslo, Norway on 8 and 9 October.

This Greco-Roman wrestling competition consists of a single-elimination tournament, with a repechage used to determine the winner of two bronze medals. The two finalists face off for gold and silver medals. Each wrestler who loses to one of the two finalists moves into the repechage, culminating in a pair of bronze medal matches featuring the semifinal losers each facing the remaining repechage opponent from their half of the bracket.

== Results ==
Legend

- F — Won by fall

=== Final ===
Final
Victor Ciobanu (MDA)	9
Zholaman Sharshenbekov (KGZ)	3

=== Top half ===
Round of 32

Round of 16
Victor Ciobanu (MDA)	11
Zhora Abovian (UKR)	6
Stepan Maryanyan (RWF)	5
Ahmet Uyar (TUR)	0
Dalton Roberts (USA)	4
Gevorg Gharibyan (ARM)	8
Mehrdad Mardani (IRI)	11
Răzvan Arnăut (ROU)	3

Quarterfinals
Victor Ciobanu (MDA)	7
Stepan Maryanyan (RWF)	6
Gevorg Gharibyan (ARM)	7
Mehrdad Mardani (IRI)	0

Semifinals
Victor Ciobanu (MDA)	9
Gevorg Gharibyan (ARM)	6

=== Bottom half ===
Round of 32
Gyanender Dahiya (IND)	4
Jung Jin-woong (KOR)	3
Helary Mägisalu (EST)	2
Ayata Suzuki (JPN)	11
Murad Mammadov (AZE)	3
Krisztián Kecskeméti (HUN)	0

Round of 16
Zholaman Sharshenbekov (KGZ)	2
Maksim Kazharski (BLR)	0
Justas Petravičius (LTU)	2
Irakli Dzimistarishvili (GEO)	4
Gyanender Dahiya (IND)	2
Ayata Suzuki (JPN)	3
Murad Mammadov (AZE)	6
Aidos Sultangali (KAZ)	1

Quarterfinals
Zholaman Sharshenbekov (KGZ)	5^{F}
Irakli Dzimistarishvili (GEO)	2
Ayata Suzuki (JPN)	1
Murad Mammadov (AZE)	5^{F}

Semifinals
Zholaman Sharshenbekov (KGZ)	4
Murad Mammadov (AZE)	2

=== Repechage ===
Repechage round 2
Zhora Abovian (UKR)	1
Stepan Maryanyan (RWF)	3
Maksim Kazharski (BLR)	4
Irakli Dzimistarishvili (GEO)	1

Bronze medals
Stepan Maryanyan (RWF)	3
Gevorg Gharibyan (ARM)	1
Maksim Kazharski (BLR)	0
Murad Mammadov (AZE)	2

== Final standing ==
Rank	Athlete
1st place, gold medalist(s)	Victor Ciobanu (MDA)
2nd place, silver medalist(s)	Zholaman Sharshenbekov (KGZ)
3rd place, bronze medalist(s)	Stepan Maryanyan (RWF)
3rd place, bronze medalist(s)	Murad Mammadov (AZE)
5	Gevorg Gharibyan (ARM)
5	Maksim Kazharski (BLR)
7	Ayata Suzuki (JPN)
8	Mehrdad Mardani (IRI)
9	Irakli Dzimistarishvili (GEO)
10	Gyanender Dahiya (IND)
11	Zhora Abovian (UKR)
12	Dalton Roberts (USA)
13	Jung Jin-woong (KOR)
14	Răzvan Arnăut (ROU)
15	Justas Petravičius (LTU)
16	Helary Mägisalu (EST)
17	Aidos Sultangali (KAZ)
18	Krisztián Kecskeméti (HUN)
19	Ahmet Uyar (TUR)
