= Aidos Sultangali =

Kazakh Greco-Roman wrestler

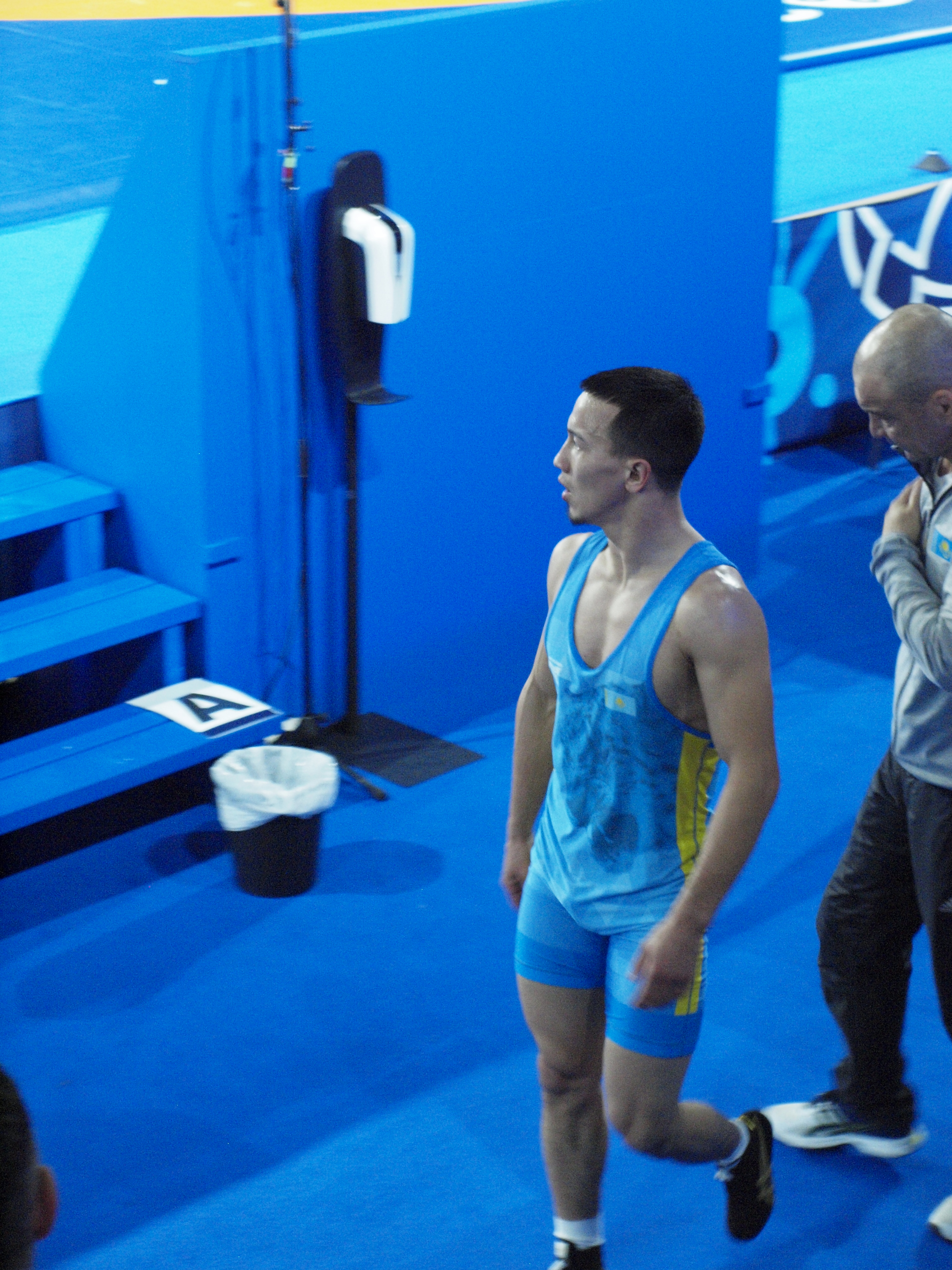
- Sultangali at the 2021 World Wrestling Championships in Oslo, Norway

Personal information
- Nationality: Kazakhstan
- Born: 7 February 1996 (age 30) Kazakhstan
- Home town: Kyzylorda, Kazakhstan
- Height: 168 cm (5 ft 6 in)

Sport
- Country: Kazakhstan
- Sport: Amateur wrestling
- Weight class: 60 kg
- Event: Greco-Roman
Medal record
Men's Greco-Roman wrestling
Representing Kazakhstan
World Championships
Gold medal – first place	2025 Zagreb	60 kg
Bronze medal – third place	2018 Budapest	60 kg
Bronze medal – third place	2022 Belgrade	60 kg
Bronze medal – third place	2026 Astana	60 kg
Asian Championships
Gold medal – first place	2021 Almaty	60 kg
Military World Games
Bronze medal – third place	2019 Wuhan	60 kg
World Military Championships
Bronze medal – third place	2024 Yerevan	60 kg
Asian Indoor and Martial Arts Games
Bronze medal – third place	2017 Ashgabat	59 kg
World U23 Championships
Bronze medal – third place	2017 Bydgoszcz	59 kg
Representing All-World Team
World Cup
Bronze medal – third place	2022 Baku	Team

Aidos Sultangali (born 7 February 1996) is a Kazakh Greco-Roman wrestler. He is a two-time bronze medalist in the 60 kg event at the World Wrestling Championships. He won the gold medal in his event at the 2021 Asian Wrestling Championships held in Almaty, Kazakhstan. Sultangali represented Kazakhstan at the 2024 Summer Olympics in Paris, France.

== Career ==
At the 2017 Asian Indoor and Martial Arts Games held in Ashgabat, Turkmenistan, Sultangali won one of the bronze medals in the 59 kg event. He won one of the bronze medals in the 60 kg event at the 2018 World Wrestling Championships held in Budapest, Hungary.

Sultangali represented Kazakhstan at the 2019 Military World Games held in Wuhan, China and he won one of the bronze medals in the 60 kg event. In 2021, he won the gold medal in the 63 kg event at the Matteo Pellicone Ranking Series 2021 held in Rome, Italy. A month later, he won the gold medal in the 60 kg event at the 2021 Asian Wrestling Championships held in Almaty, Kazakhstan. In October 2021, he competed in the 60 kg event at the World Wrestling Championships held in Oslo, Norway where he was eliminated in his first match.

Sultangali won one of the bronze medals in the 60 kg event at the 2022 World Wrestling Championships held in Belgrade, Serbia. He defeated Krisztián Kecskeméti of Hungary in his bronze medal match. In 2023, he lost his bronze medal match in the 60 kg event at the 2022 Asian Games held in Hangzhou, China. He lost against Ri Se-ung of North Korea in his bronze medal match.

Sultangali competed at the 2024 Asian Wrestling Olympic Qualification Tournament in Bishkek, Kyrgyzstan and he earned a quota place for Kazakhstan for the 2024 Summer Olympics in Paris, France. Sultangali competed in the 60 kg event at the Olympics. He was eliminated in his first match by Zholaman Sharshenbekov of Kyrgyzstan. Sharshenbekov went on to win one of the bronze medals in the event.

== Achievements ==
Year	Tournament	Location	Result	Event
2017	Asian Indoor and Martial Arts Games	Ashgabat, Turkmenistan	3rd	Greco-Roman 59 kg
2018	World Championships	Budapest, Hungary	3rd	Greco-Roman 60 kg
2019	Military World Games	Wuhan, China	3rd	Greco-Roman 60 kg
2021	Asian Championships	Almaty, Kazakhstan	1st	Greco-Roman 60 kg
2022	World Championships	Belgrade, Serbia	3rd	Greco-Roman 60 kg
