= 2024 World Military Wrestling Championships =

- Host city: Yerevan, Armenia
- Dates: 18–24 November
- Stadium: Karen Demirchyan Complex

Champions
- Freestyle: Russia
- Greco-Roman: Russia
- Women: North Korea

The 2024 World Military Wrestling Championships was the 37th edition of the World Military Wrestling Championships, which was held in Yerevan, Armenia between 18 and 24 November 2024.

== History ==
First championship was held in 1961 in Turkey.

== Ranking ==
The Greco-Roman wrestling team rankings for the tournament are as follows: 1- Russia with 175 points, 2- Iran with 161 points, 3- Armenia with 157 points, 4- Turkey with 141 points, 5- Kazakhstan with 76 points and 6- USA with 73 points.

Russia also won the freestyle wrestling championship. The world military freestyle wrestling team rankings are as follows: 1- Russia with 165 points, 2- Iran with 136 points, 3- Mongolia with 131 points, 4- India with 121 points and 5- Kazakhstan with 107 points.

== Medal table ==
* Host nation (Armenia)

Rank	Nation	Gold	Silver	Bronze	Total
1	North Korea	7	2	1	10
2	Russia	4	3	10	17
3	Armenia*	3	3	8	14
4	India	3	1	3	7
5	Kazakhstan	3	0	4	7
6	Mongolia	2	5	3	10
7	Turkey	2	1	5	8
8	Iran	1	7	6	14
9	United States	1	4	1	6
10	France	1	3	1	5
11	Hungary	1	0	1	2
11	Romania	1	0	1	2
11	Switzerland	1	0	1	2
14	Belarus	0	1	2	3
15	Colombia	0	0	1	1
15	Italy	0	0	1	1
Totals (16 entries)		30	30	49	109

== Medal overview ==
=== Men's freestyle ===
Event	Gold	Silver	Bronze
57 kg	Son Han-chong; North Korea	Mönkh-Erdeniin Davaabandi; Mongolia	Mehdi Veisi; Iran
57 kg	Son Han-chong; North Korea	Mönkh-Erdeniin Davaabandi; Mongolia	Shubham; India
61 kg	Kim Kwang-myong; North Korea	Sargis Begoyan; Armenia	Amir Chamzyn; Russia
61 kg	Kim Kwang-myong; North Korea	Sargis Begoyan; Armenia	Mehdi Rahimi; Iran
65 kg	Andranik Avetisyan; Armenia	Kim Jin-wang; North Korea	Mohammad Mehdi Palangvari; Iran
65 kg	Andranik Avetisyan; Armenia	Kim Jin-wang; North Korea	Dzhambulat Kizinov; Russia
70 kg	Meirzhan Ashirov; Kazakhstan	Sharwan; India	Inar Ketiia; Russia
70 kg	Meirzhan Ashirov; Kazakhstan	Sharwan; India	Khamzat Arsamerzouev; France
74 kg	Jaideep Narwal; India	Amir Hossein Hosseini; Iran	Hrayr Alikhanyan; Armenia
74 kg	Jaideep Narwal; India	Amir Hossein Hosseini; Iran	Fazlı Eryılmaz; Turkey
79 kg	Olonbayaryn Süldkhüü; Mongolia	Mokhmad Nasirkhaev; Russia	Arman Avagyan; Armenia
79 kg	Olonbayaryn Süldkhüü; Mongolia	Mokhmad Nasirkhaev; Russia	Chandermohan; India
86 kg	Arslan Bagaev; Russia	Rakhim Magamadov; France	Rustem Myrzagaliyev; Kazakhstan
86 kg	Arslan Bagaev; Russia	Rakhim Magamadov; France	Ilya Khamtsou; Belarus
92 kg	Askhab Sadulaev; Russia	Yaroslav Yadkovski; Belarus	Mushegh Mkrtchyan; Armenia
92 kg	Askhab Sadulaev; Russia	Yaroslav Yadkovski; Belarus	Javad Fathkani; Iran
97 kg	Kamil Kurugliev; Kazakhstan	Danial Shariatinia; Iran	Sergey Kozyrev; Russia
97 kg	Kamil Kurugliev; Kazakhstan	Danial Shariatinia; Iran	Ganbaataryn Gankhuyag; Mongolia
125 kg	Batmagnai Enkhtuvshin; Mongolia	Morteza Janmohammadi; Iran	Adil Mısırcı; Turkey
125 kg	Batmagnai Enkhtuvshin; Mongolia	Morteza Janmohammadi; Iran	Alan Khugaev; Russia

=== Men's Greco-Roman ===
Event	Gold	Silver	Bronze
55 kg	Ro Yu-chol; North Korea	Tigran Minasyan; Armenia	Kianoush Shamshiri; Iran
55 kg	Ro Yu-chol; North Korea	Tigran Minasyan; Armenia	Viktor Vedernikov; Russia
60 kg	Suren Aghajanyan; Armenia	Ri Se-ung; North Korea	Aidos Sultangali; Kazakhstan
60 kg	Suren Aghajanyan; Armenia	Ri Se-ung; North Korea	Mohammad Javad Talebi; Iran
63 kg	Kerem Kamal; Turkey	Ildar Hafizov; United States	Sergey Emelin; Russia
63 kg	Kerem Kamal; Turkey	Ildar Hafizov; United States	Hrachya Poghosyan; Armenia
67 kg	Gaspar Terteryan; Armenia	Ali Choubakzan; Iran	Maksim Skuratov; Russia
67 kg	Gaspar Terteryan; Armenia	Ali Choubakzan; Iran	Son Man-gwang; North Korea
72 kg	Selçuk Can; Turkey	Morteza Poureisa; Iran	Aleksey Kiyankin; Russia
72 kg	Selçuk Can; Turkey	Morteza Poureisa; Iran	Shant Khachatryan; Armenia
77 kg	Amir Abdi; Iran	Sergei Stepanov; Russia	Ashot Khachatryan; Armenia
77 kg	Amir Abdi; Iran	Sergei Stepanov; Russia	Yunus Emre Başar; Turkey
82 kg	Rafael Yunusov; Russia	Burhan Akbudak; Turkey	Kamal Bey; United States
82 kg	Rafael Yunusov; Russia	Burhan Akbudak; Turkey	Samvel Grigoryan; Armenia
87 kg	Vaag Margaryan; Russia	Jamal Esmaeili; Iran	Karen Khachatryan; Armenia
87 kg	Vaag Margaryan; Russia	Jamal Esmaeili; Iran	Ali Cengiz; Turkey
97 kg	Alex Szőke; Hungary	Magomed Murtazaliev; Russia	Muhittin Sarıçiçek; Turkey
97 kg	Alex Szőke; Hungary	Magomed Murtazaliev; Russia	Cristian Bravo; Colombia
130 kg	Alimkhan Syzdykov; Kazakhstan	Mehdi Kalantari; Iran	Marat Kamparov; Russia

=== Women's freestyle ===
Event	Gold	Silver	Bronze
50 kg			
53 kg			
55 kg			
57 kg			
59 kg			
62 kg			
65 kg			
68 kg			
72 kg			
76 kg			
