= Tarik Belmadani =

French Greco-Roman wrestler

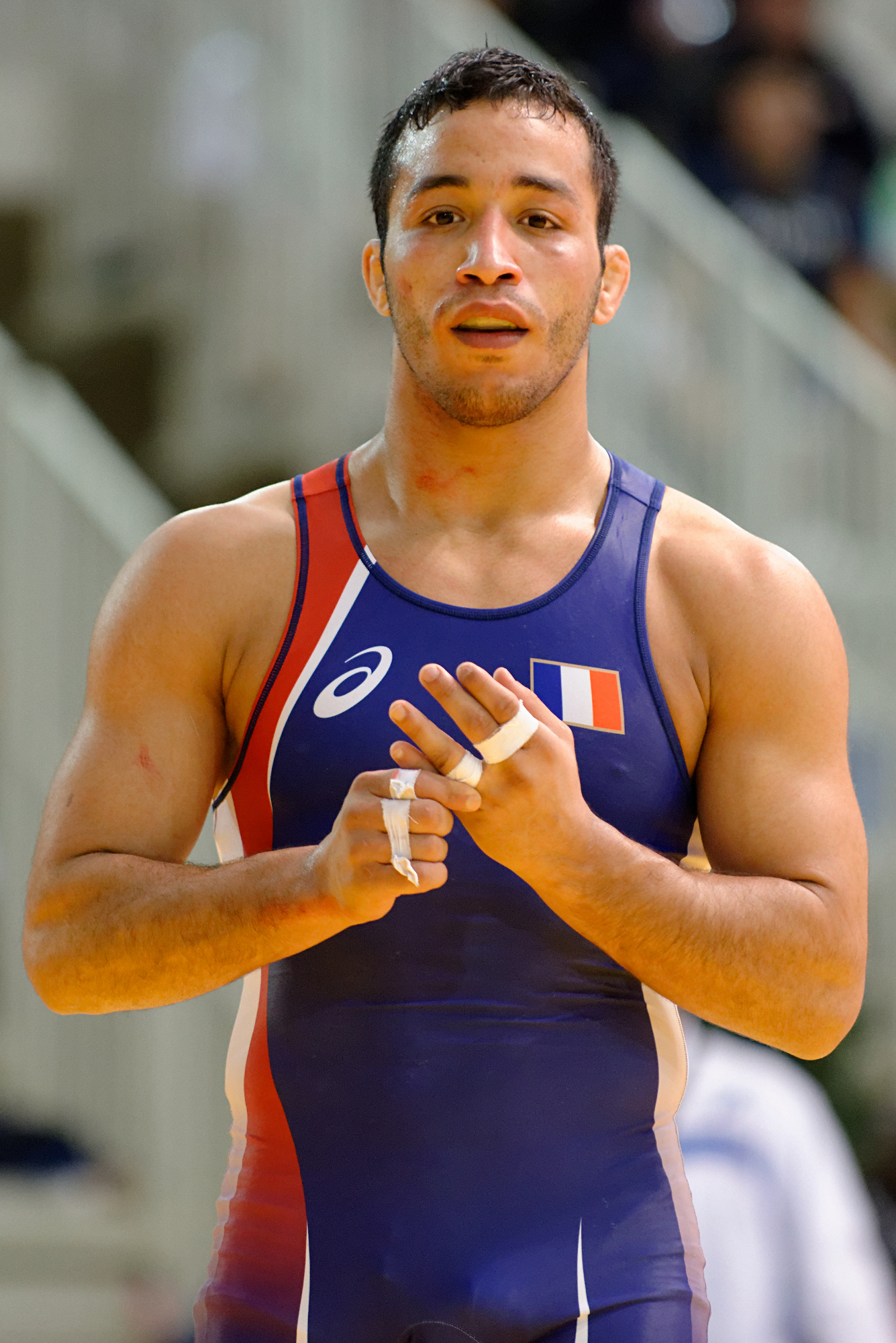
- Belmadani at the 2014 Paris Golden Grand Prix

Personal information
- Born: 17 November 1987 (age 38) Viriat, France
- Height: 1.68 m (5 ft 6 in)

Sport
- Sport: Greco-Roman wrestling
- Club: Club Bagnolet Lutte 93
- Coached by: Lilian Chirain
Medal record
Men's Greco-Roman wrestling
Representing France
European Games
Bronze medal – third place	2015 Baku	59 kg

Tarik Belmadini (born 17 November 1987 in Viriat) is a French Greco-Roman wrestler. He competed in the Greco-Roman 60 kg event at the 2012 Summer Olympics; after defeating Jarkko Ala-Huikku in the 1/8 finals, he was eliminated by Ryutaro Matsumoto in the quarterfinals. In June 2015, he competed in the inaugural European Games, for France in wrestling, more specifically, Men's Greco-Roman in the 59 kilogram range. He earned a bronze medal. He won bronze medal in 2015 European Games
