= 2023 U23 World Wrestling Championships – Men's Greco-Roman 60 kg =

Wrestling competitions

Men's Greco-Roman 60 kg at the 2023 U23 World Championships
- Venue: Tirana Olympic Park
- Dates: 27–28 October
- Competitors: 19 from 17 nations

Medalists
gold medal	Anvar Allakhiarov	Authorised Neutral Athletes
silver medal	Romeo Beridze	Georgia
bronze medal	Mert İlbars	Turkey
bronze medal	Sumit Dalal

The men's Greco-Roman 60 kg is a competition featured at the 2023 U23 World Wrestling Championships, and was held in Tirana, Albania on 27 and 28 October 2023.

This freestyle wrestling competition consists of a single-elimination tournament, with a repechage used to determine the winner of two bronze medals. The two finalists face off for gold and silver medals. Each wrestler who loses to one of the two finalists moves into the repechage, culminating in a pair of bronze medal matches featuring the semifinal losers each facing the remaining repechage opponent from their half of the bracket.

== Results ==
Legend

- F — Won by fall

=== Final ===
Final
Romeo Beridze (GEO)	0
Anvar Allakhiarov (ANA)	10

=== Top half ===
Round of 32
Vladyslav Kuzko (UKR)	0
Mert İlbars (TUR)	5

Round of 16
Suren Aghajanyan (ARM)	8
Kosei Takeshita (JPN)	5
Mert İlbars (TUR)	8
Georgios Scarpello (GER)	1
Romeo Beridze (GEO)	12
Grzegorz Kunkel (POL)	4
Phillip Moomey (USA)	0
Aibek Sabyrbekov (KAZ)	9

Quarterfinals
Suren Aghajanyan (ARM)	3
Mert İlbars (TUR)	4
Romeo Beridze (GEO)	10
Aibek Sabyrbekov (KAZ)	5

Semifinals
Mert İlbars (TUR)	1
Romeo Beridze (GEO)	3

=== Bottom half ===
Round of 32
Sumit Dalal (UWW)	8
Ángel Segura (MEX)	0
Yonaiker Martínez (VEN)	6
Adrian Anton (ROM)	1

Round of 16
Nihad Guluzade (AZE)	8
Ergi Uku (ALB)	0
Sumit Dalal (UWW)	7
Nurmukhammet Abdullaev (KGZ)	0
Anvar Allakhiarov (ANA)	8
Yonaiker Martínez (VEN)	0
Munthir Jandu (KSA)	3^{F}
Ilias Zairakis (GRE)	2

Quarterfinals
Nihad Guluzade (AZE)	3
Sumit Dalal (UWW)	5
Anvar Allakhiarov (ANA)	9
Munthir Jandu (KSA)	1

Semifinals
Sumit Dalal (UWW)	4
Anvar Allakhiarov (ANA)	9

=== Repechage ===
Repechage round 2
Grzegorz Kunkel (POL)	0
Aibek Sabyrbekov (KAZ)	7
Yonaiker Martínez (VEN)	8
Munthir Jandu (KSA)	7

Bronze medals
Aibek Sabyrbekov (KAZ)	1
Mert İlbars (TUR)	9
Yonaiker Martínez (VEN)	3
Sumit Dalal (UWW)	4
