= 2021 U23 World Wrestling Championships – Men's Greco-Roman 60 kg =

Greco-Roman event at World Wrestling Championship

The men's Greco-Roman 60 kilograms is a competition featured at the 2021 U23 World Wrestling Championships, and was held in Belgrade, Serbia on 2 and 3 November.

== Medalists ==
Gold	Anvar Allakhiarov (RUS)
Silver	Mehdi Mohsennejad (IRI)
Bronze	Pridon Abuladze (GEO)
Bronze	Kerem Kamal (TUR)

== Results ==
Legend

- F — Won by fall
- WO — Won by walkover

=== Final ===
Final
Mehdi Mohsennejad (IRI)	1
Anvar Allakhiarov (RUS)	7

=== Top half ===
Round of 32

Round of 16
Dylan Gregerson (USA)	0
Mehdi Mohsennejad (IRI)	8
Galym Kabdunassarov (KAZ)	0
Mukhamadkodir Yusupov (UZB)	8
Răzvan Arnăut (ROU)	9
Olivier Skrzypczak (POL)	1
Nurmukhammet Abdullaev (KGZ)	2
Pridon Abuladze (GEO)	3

Quarterfinals
Mehdi Mohsennejad (IRI)	8
Mukhamadkodir Yusupov (UZB)	0
Răzvan Arnăut (ROU)	4
Pridon Abuladze (GEO)	7

Semifinals
Mehdi Mohsennejad (IRI)	5
Pridon Abuladze (GEO)	3

=== Bottom half ===
Round of 32
Tigran Minasyan (ARM)	8
Hleb Makaranka (BLR)	0
Vikas (IND)	10
Huang Jui-chi (TPE)	2
Vitalie Eriomenco (MDA)	WO
~~David Novič (SRB)~~
Anvar Allakhiarov (RUS)	8
Rayan Hawsawi (KSA)	0
Jeremy Peralta (ECU)	1
Dimitar Sandov (SUI)	10
Ihor Kurochkin (UKR)	8
Miroslav Emilov (BUL)	0

Round of 16
Kerem Kamal (TUR)	11^{F}
Tommaso Bosi (ITA)	0
Tigran Minasyan (ARM)	8
Vikas (IND)	0
Vitalie Eriomenco (MDA)	0
Anvar Allakhiarov (RUS)	11
Dimitar Sandov (SUI)	0
Ihor Kurochkin (UKR)	9

Quarterfinals
Kerem Kamal (TUR)	2
Tigran Minasyan (ARM)	2
Anvar Allakhiarov (RUS)	3
Ihor Kurochkin (UKR)	0

Semifinals
Kerem Kamal (TUR)	0
Anvar Allakhiarov (RUS)	9

=== Repechage ===
Repechage round 1
Rayan Hawsawi (KSA)	2
Vitalie Eriomenco (MDA)	11

Repechage round 2
Dylan Gregerson (USA)	1
Mukhamadkodir Yusupov (UZB)	6^{F}
Vitalie Eriomenco (MDA)	4
Ihor Kurochkin (UKR)	12

Bronze medals
Mukhamadkodir Yusupov (UZB)	3
Pridon Abuladze (GEO)	3
Ihor Kurochkin (UKR)	5
Kerem Kamal (TUR)	6
