= 2020 Individual Wrestling World Cup – Men's Greco-Roman 60 kg =

The Men's Greco-Roman 60 kg is a competition featured at the 2020 Individual Wrestling World Cup, and was held in Belgrade, Serbia on 13 and 14 December 2020.

== Medalists ==
Gold	Zholaman Sharshenbekov; Kyrgyzstan
Silver	Stepan Maryanyan; Russia
Bronze	Maksim Kazharski; Belarus
Bronze	Kristijan Fris; Serbia

== Results ==
Legend

- F — Won by fall
- R — Retired
- WO — Won by walkover

1/16 finals
	Score	
Kristijan Fris (SRB)	0–0 Ret	Helary Mägisalu (EST)
Tsvetan Sirashki (BUL)	0–9	Abdennour Laouni (ALG)
Gyanender Dahiya (IND)	3–0	Armen Melikyan (ARM)

1/8 finals
Ahmet Uyar (TUR)	10
Viktor Petryk (UKR)	1
Fouad Fajari (MAR)	1
Jacopo Sandron (ITA)	3
Nihat Mammadli (AZE)	0
Victor Ciobanu (MDA)	7
Zholaman Sharshenbekov (KGZ)	8
Maksim Kazharski (BLR)	0
Stepan Maryanyan (RUS)	9
Krisztián Kecskeméti (HUN)	0
Abere Fetene (ISR)	7
Joao Benavides (PER)	3
Răzvan Arnăut (ROU)	3
Kristijan Fris (SRB)	6
Abdennour Laouni (ALG)	1
Gyanender Dahiya (IND)	5

Quarterfinals
Ahmet Uyar (TUR)	9
Jacopo Sandron (ITA)	1
Victor Ciobanu (MDA)	0
Zholaman Sharshenbekov (KGZ)	8
Stepan Maryanyan (RUS)	8
Abere Fetene (ISR)	0
Kristijan Fris (SRB)	9
Gyanender Dahiya (IND)	0

Semifinals
Ahmet Uyar (TUR)	1
Zholaman Sharshenbekov (KGZ)	5
Stepan Maryanyan (RUS)	8
Kristijan Fris (SRB)	3

Final
Zholaman Sharshenbekov (KGZ)	4
Stepan Maryanyan (RUS)	4

Repechage round 1
Maksim Kazharski (BLR)	3
Victor Ciobanu (MDA)	1
Krisztián Kecskeméti (HUN)	10
Abere Fetene (ISR)	0

Bronze medals
Maksim Kazharski (BLR)	3
Ahmet Uyar (TUR)	3
Krisztián Kecskeméti (HUN)	0
Kristijan Fris (SRB)	2
