= Cao Liguo =

Chinese Greco-Roman wrestler

Personal information
- Native name: 曹利国
- Nationality: China
- Born: 4 October 1998 (age 27) Guangxi, China
- Education: Wuhan Sports University
- Height: 165 cm (5 ft 5 in)
- Weight: 60 kg (132 lb)

Sport
- Country: China
- Sport: Amateur wrestling
- Weight class: 60 kg
- Event: Greco-Roman
Medal record
Men's Greco-Roman wrestling
Representing China
Olympic Games
Silver medal – second place	2024 Paris	60 kg
World Championships
Bronze medal – third place	2023 Belgrade	60 kg
Asian Championships
Bronze medal – third place	2024 Bishkek	60 kg
Bronze medal – third place	2023 Astana	60 kg
Poland Open
Bronze medal – third place	2022 Warsaw	60 kg
National Games of China
Bronze medal – third place	2021 Shaanxi	60 kg

Cao Liguo (born 4 October 1998) is a Chinese Greco-Roman wrestler. He won a silver medal in the men's 60 kg event at the 2024 Summer Olympics in Paris, France. He also won a bronze medal in the 60 kg event at the 2023 World Wrestling Championships.

== Background ==
Cao began wrestling when he was 12. His coach is Li Shujin.

He attended Wuhan Sports University.

== Career ==
In April 2023, Cao won a bronze medal in the 60 kg of the 2023 Asian Wrestling Championships after defeating Yernur Fidakhmetov.

In September 2023, Cao won a bronze medal in the 60 kg of the 2023 World Wrestling Championships after defeating Gevorg Gharibyan.

In August 2024, Cao won a silver medal in the men's 60 kg event at the 2024 Summer Olympics in Paris, France after losing to Kenichiro Fumita.
