= 2019 European Wrestling Championships – Men's Greco-Roman 60 kg =

The Men's Greco-Roman 60 kg is a competition featured at the 2019 European Wrestling Championships, and was held in Bucharest, Romania on April 13 and April 14.

== Medalists ==
| Gold | Victor Ciobanu; Moldova |
| Silver | Sergey Emelin; Russia |
| Bronze | Lenur Temirov; Ukraine |
| Bronze | Kerem Kamal; Turkey |

== Results ==
Legend

- F — Won by fall

=== Final ===
| Final |
| Victor Ciobanu (MDA) | 5 |
| Sergey Emelin (RUS) | 5 |

=== Top half ===
Round of 32

Round of 16
Lenur Temirov (UKR) | 6
Gevorg Gharibyan (ARM) | 5
Dawid Ersetic (POL) | 0
Murad Mammadov (AZE) | 9
Avgustin Spasov (BUL) | 7
Ramaz Surmanidze (GEO) | 3
Ivan Lizatović (CRO) | 1
Victor Ciobanu (MDA) | 3

Quarterfinals
Lenur Temirov (UKR) | 10
Murad Mammadov (AZE) | 5
Avgustin Spasov (BUL) | 0
Victor Ciobanu (MDA) | 10

Semifinals
Lenur Temirov (UKR) | 4
Victor Ciobanu (MDA) | 6

=== Bottom half ===
Round of 32
Dzmitry Brychak (BLR) | 0
Kerem Kamal (TUR) | 9
Mattias Poutanen (FIN) | 0
Ardit Fazljija (SWE) | 9
Etienne Kinsinger (GER) | 5
Erik Torba (HUN) | 4
Jacopo Sandron (ITA) | 5
Albert Baghumyan (ESP) | 0

Round of 16
Sergey Emelin (RUS) | 9
Virgil Munteanu (ROU) | 0
António Cabral (POR) | 0
Helary Mägisalu (EST) | 8
Kerem Kamal (TUR) | 3
Ardit Fazljija (SWE) | 1
Etienne Kinsinger (GER) | 0
Jacopo Sandron (ITA) | 4

Quarterfinals
Sergey Emelin (RUS) | 8
Helary Mägisalu (EST) | 0
Kerem Kamal (TUR) | 5
Jacopo Sandron (ITA) | 0

Semifinals
Sergey Emelin (RUS) | 7
Kerem Kamal (TUR) | 0

=== Repechage ===
Repechage round 1
Ivan Lizatović (CRO) | 6
Avgustin Spasov (BUL) | 3
Virgil Munteanu (ROU) | 3
Helary Mägisalu (EST) | 1

Bronze medal match
Ivan Lizatović (CRO) | 0
Lenur Temirov (UKR) | 9
Virgil Munteanu (ROU) | 1
Kerem Kamal (TUR) | 4
