= Stepan Maryanyan =

Russian Greco-Roman wrestler

Personal information
- Nationality: (Russia) Russian
- Born: 21 September 1991 (age 34) Dinskaya, Krasnodarsky Krai, Russia
- Height: 1.68 m (5 ft 6 in)
- Weight: 59 kg (130 lb)

Sport
- Country: Russia
- Sport: Wrestling
- Event: Greco-Roman
- Club: SDUSHOR 8 Krasnodar
- Coached by: Aleksey Ivanov
Medal record
Men's Greco-Roman wrestling
Representing Russia
World Championships
Gold medal – first place	2018 Budapest	63 kg
Silver medal – second place	2019 Nur-Sultan	63 kg
Bronze medal – third place	2017 Paris	59 kg
Bronze medal – third place	2021 Oslo	60 kg
Individual World Cup
Silver medal – second place	2020 Belgrade	60 kg
European Championships
Gold medal – first place	2019 Bucharest	63 kg
European Games
Gold medal – first place	2015 Baku	59 kg
Gold medal – first place	2019 Minsk	60 kg
World Cup
Gold medal – first place	2013 Tehran	59 kg
Representing Russian Wrestling Federation
World Championships
Bronze medal – third place	2021 Oslo	60 kg

Stepan Mailovich Maryanyan (Russian: Степан Маилович Марянян; born 21 September 1991) is a Russian Greco-Roman wrestler of Armenian descent. He came in first place at the 2013 Wrestling World Cup and was runner-up at the 2015 Russian Nationals Greco-Roman. During the 2015 European Games held in Baku, Azerbaijan, Maryanyan won a gold medal for 59 kg Greco-Roman wrestling. This was the first ever gold for Russia at the European Games. 2018 World Champion at 63 kilos.

In 2020, he won the silver medal in the 60 kg event at the 2020 Individual Wrestling World Cup held in Belgrade, Serbia. In 2021, he won one of the bronze medals in the 60 kg event at the 2021 World Wrestling Championships held in Oslo, Norway.
