= Wrestling at the 2015 European Games – Men's Greco-Roman 59 kg =

Men's Greco-Roman 59 kg at the 2015 European Games
- Venue: Heydar Aliyev Arena
- Date: 13 June
- Competitors: 24 from 24 nations

Medalists
| gold medal | Stepan Maryanyan | Russia |
| silver medal | Soslan Daurov | Belarus |
| bronze medal | Elman Mukhtarov | Azerbaijan |
| bronze medal | Tarik Belmadani | France |

Men's Greco-Roman 59 kg competition at the 2015 European Games in Baku, Azerbaijan, took place on 13 June at the Heydar Aliyev Arena.

== Schedule ==
All times are Azerbaijan Standard Time (UTC+04:00)

| Date | Time | Event |
|---|---|---|
| Saturday, 13 June 2015 | 10:00 | Qualifications |
| Saturday, 13 June 2015 | 11:00 | 1/8 finals |
| Saturday, 13 June 2015 | 13:00 | Quarterfinals |
| Saturday, 13 June 2015 | 13:00 | Semifinals |
| Saturday, 13 June 2015 | 15:00 | Repechage |
| Saturday, 13 June 2015 | 19:00 | Finals |

== Results ==
Legend

- F — Won by fall

=== Final ===
| Final |
| (Russia) Stepan Maryanyan (RUS) | 3 |
| (Belarus) Soslan Daurov (BLR) | 0 |

=== Top half ===
Qualifications

1/8 finals
(Azerbaijan) Elman Mukhtarov (AZE) | 5
(Georgia (country)) Gizo Meladze (GEO) | 3
(Slovenia) Daniel Kočar (SLO) | 0
(Norway) Stig-André Berge (NOR) | 8
(Portugal) João Carvalho (POR) | 0
(Armenia) Roman Amoyan (ARM) | 6
(Russia) Stepan Maryanyan (RUS) | 8
(Denmark) Tobias Fonnesbek (DEN) | 0

Quarterfinals
(Azerbaijan) Elman Mukhtarov (AZE) | 7
(Norway) Stig-André Berge (NOR) | 6
(Armenia) Roman Amoyan (ARM) | 0
(Russia) Stepan Maryanyan (RUS) | 9

Semifinals
(Azerbaijan) Elman Mukhtarov (AZE) | 3
(Russia) Stepan Maryanyan (RUS) | 11

=== Bottom half ===
Qualifications
(Poland) Arkadiusz Gucik (POL) | 1
(Greece) Apostolos Manouilidis (GRE) | 6
(Moldova) Victor Ciobanu (MDA) | 8
(Israel) Andrey Tsaryuk (ISR) | 0
(Turkey) Fatih Üçüncü (TUR) | 9
(Croatia) Ivan Lizatović (CRO) | 0
(Romania) Virgil Munteanu (ROU) | 1
(Hungary) Csongor Knipli (HUN) | 0
(Finland) Jani Haapamäki (FIN) | 9
(Serbia) Kristijan Fris (SRB) | 8
(Czech Republic) Michal Novák (CZE) | 2
(Germany) Deniz Menekse (GER) | 8^{F}
(Belarus) Soslan Daurov (BLR) | 8
(Ukraine) Dmytro Kosenok (UKR) | 0
(Bulgaria) Aleksandar Kostadinov (BUL) | 0
(France) Tarik Belmadani (FRA) | 8

1/8 finals
(Greece) Apostolos Manouilidis (GRE) | 0
(Moldova) Victor Ciobanu (MDA) | 8
(Turkey) Fatih Üçüncü (TUR) | 1
(Romania) Virgil Munteanu (ROU) | 3
(Finland) Jani Haapamäki (FIN) | 0
(Germany) Deniz Menekse (GER) | 9
(Belarus) Soslan Daurov (BLR) | 4
(France) Tarik Belmadani (FRA) | 2

Quarterfinals
(Moldova) Victor Ciobanu (MDA) | 3
(Romania) Virgil Munteanu (ROU) | 1
(Germany) Deniz Menekse (GER) | 0
(Belarus) Soslan Daurov (BLR) | 9

Semifinals
(Moldova) Victor Ciobanu (MDA) | 1
(Belarus) Soslan Daurov (BLR) | 2

=== Repechage ===
Repechage round 1
(Ukraine) Dmytro Kosenok (UKR) | 0
(France) Tarik Belmadani (FRA) | 8

Repechage round 2
(Denmark) Tobias Fonnesbek (DEN) | 0
(Armenia) Roman Amoyan (ARM) | 2
(France) Tarik Belmadani (FRA) | 6
(Germany) Deniz Menekse (GER) | 0

Bronze medal match
(Armenia) Roman Amoyan (ARM) | 1
(Azerbaijan) Elman Mukhtarov (AZE) | 9
(France) Tarik Belmadani (FRA) | 7
(Moldova) Victor Ciobanu (MDA) | 1
