= 2024 U23 World Wrestling Championships – Men's Greco-Roman 60 kg =

Wrestling competitions

Men's Greco-Roman 60 kg at the 2024 U23 World Championships
- Venue: Tirana Olympic Park
- Dates: 21–22 October
- Competitors: 20 from 18 nations

Medalists
| gold medal | Alisher Ganiev | Uzbekistan |
| silver medal | Dinislam Bammatov | Authorised Neutral Athletes |
| bronze medal | Nihad Guluzade | Azerbaijan |
| bronze medal | Pridon Abuladze | Georgia |

The men's Greco-Roman 60 kilograms is a competition featured at the 2024 U23 World Wrestling Championships, and was held in Tirana, Albania on 21 and 22 October 2024.

This Greco-Roman wrestling competition consists of a single-elimination tournament, with a repechage used to determine the winner of two bronze medals. The two finalists face off for gold and silver medals. Each wrestler who loses to one of the two finalists moves into the repechage, culminating in a pair of bronze medal matches featuring the semifinal losers each facing the remaining repechage opponent from their half of the bracket.

== Results ==
Legend

- F — Won by fall

=== Final ===
| Final |
| Alisher Ganiev (UZB) | 8 |
| Dinislam Bammatov (AIN) | 4 |

=== Top half ===
Round of 32
Georgios Scarpello (GER) | 0
Alisher Ganiev (UZB) | 9
Nihad Guluzade (AZE) | 6
Yasuhito Mori (JPN) | 3

Round of 16
Bohdan Hryshyn (UKR) | 4
Olivier Skrzypczak (POL) | 1
Alisher Ganiev (UZB) | 8
Denis Mihai (ROU) | 0
Maxwell Black (USA) | 0
Nihad Guluzade (AZE) | 9
Artsiom Katsar (AIN) | 0
Mohammad Mehdi Gholampour (IRI) | 12

Quarterfinals
Bohdan Hryshyn (UKR) | 2
Alisher Ganiev (UZB) | 11
Nihad Guluzade (AZE) | 10
Mohammad Mehdi Gholampour (IRI) | 5

Semifinals
Alisher Ganiev (UZB) | 9
Nihad Guluzade (AZE) | 0

=== Bottom half ===
Round of 32
Hassan Al-Harthi (KSA) | 0
Doszhan Utepkaliyev (KAZ) | 8
Suren Aghajanyan (ARM) | 9
Ilias Zairakis (GRE) | 0

Round of 16
Pridon Abuladze (GEO) | 6
Akyl Sulaimanov (KGZ) | 5
Doszhan Utepkaliyev (KAZ) | 11
Xi Ziyue (CHN) | 0
Mert İlbars (TUR) | 0
Suren Aghajanyan (ARM) | 9
Suraj Vashisht (IND) | 1
Dinislam Bammatov (AIN) | 4

Quarterfinals
Pridon Abuladze (GEO) | 7
Doszhan Utepkaliyev (KAZ) | 4
Suren Aghajanyan (ARM) | 3
Dinislam Bammatov (AIN) | 3

Semifinals
Pridon Abuladze (GEO) | 1
Dinislam Bammatov (AIN) | 4

=== Repechage ===
Repechage round 1
Georgios Scarpello (GER) | 3
Denis Mihai (ROU) | 4

Repechage round 2
Denis Mihai (ROU) | 6
Bohdan Hryshyn (UKR) | 3
Suraj Vashisht (IND) | 2
Suren Aghajanyan (ARM) | 2

Bronze medals
Denis Mihai (ROU) | 0
Nihad Guluzade (AZE) | 9
Suraj Vashisht (IND) | 1
Pridon Abuladze (GEO) | 9

== Final standing ==
| Rank | Athlete |
|---|---|
| 1st place, gold medalist(s) | Alisher Ganiev (UZB) |
| 2nd place, silver medalist(s) | Dinislam Bammatov (AIN) |
| 3rd place, bronze medalist(s) | Nihad Guluzade (AZE) |
| 3rd place, bronze medalist(s) | Pridon Abuladze (GEO) |
| 5 | Denis Mihai (ROU) |
| 5 | Suraj Vashisht (IND) |
| 7 | Suren Aghajanyan (ARM) |
| 8 | Doszhan Utepkaliyev (KAZ) |
| 9 | Mohammad Mehdi Gholampour (IRI) |
| 10 | Bohdan Hryshyn (UKR) |
| 11 | Akyl Sulaimanov (KGZ) |
| 12 | Yasuhito Mori (JPN) |
| 13 | Georgios Scarpello (GER) |
| 14 | Olivier Skrzypczak (POL) |
| 15 | Hassan Al-Harthi (KSA) |
| 16 | Maxwell Black (USA) |
| 17 | Mert İlbars (TUR) |
| 18 | Ilias Zairakis (GRE) |
| 19 | Xi Ziyue (CHN) |
| 20 | Artsiom Katsar (AIN) |
