= Alisher Ganiev =

Uzbek Greco-Roman wrestler (born 2005)

Personal information
- Native name: Алишер Ганиев
- Born: 11 December 2004 (age 21) Fergana, Uzbekistan

Sport
- Sport: Amateur wrestling
- Weight class: 60 kg
- Event: Greco-Roman wrestling
Medal record
Men's Greco-Roman wrestling
Representing Uzbekistan
World Championships
Silver medal – second place	2025 Zagreb	60 kg
Bronze medal – third place	2026 Astana	60 kg
Asian Games
Silver medal – second place	2026 Aichi–Nagoya	60 kg
Asian Championships
Gold medal – first place	2026 Bishkek	60 kg
Silver medal – second place	2025 Amman	60 kg
Islamic Solidarity Games
Gold medal – first place	2025 Riyadh	60 kg
Grand Prix
Silver medal – second place	2026 Zagreb	60 kg
World U23 Championships
Gold medal – first place	2024 Tirana	60 kg
World Junior Championships
Bronze medal – third place	2023 Amman	55 kg
Asian Junior Championships
Gold medal – first place	2023 Amman	60 kg

Alisher Ganiev (Russian: Алишер Ганиев; born 11 December 2004) is an Uzbek Greco-Roman wrestler competing in the 60 kg weight class.

== Career ==
In 2025, Ganiev won the silver medal at the 2025 Asian Wrestling Championships in Amman, Jordan in the 60 kg event.

He is the 2024 U23 World Champion in the 60 kg division. Ganiev also won a bronze medal at the 2023 World Junior Wrestling Championships and became the Asian junior champion in the same year.
