= Mehdi Mohsennejad =

Iranian Greco-Roman wrestler (born 1998)

Mehdi Mohsen Nejad
Personal information
- Native name: مهدی سیف الله محسن نژاد
- Full name: Mehdi Seifollah Mohsen Nejad
- Born: 9 December 1998 (age 27) Behbahan, Iran
- Height: 1.60 m (5 ft 3 in)
- Weight: 60 kg (132 lb)

Sport
- Country: Iran
- Sport: Greco-Roman
- Event: 60 kg
Medal record
Men's Greco-Roman wrestling
Representing Iran
Asian Championships
Silver medal – second place	2021 Almaty	60 kg
Silver medal – second place	2022 Ulaanbaatar	60 kg
Bronze medal – third place	2020 New Delhi	60 kg
World Cup
Gold medal – first place	2022 Baku	Team
Vehbi Emre & Hamit Kaplan Tournament
Bronze medal – third place	2019 Istanbul	60 kg
Grand Prix
Gold medal – first place	2020 Shiraz	60 kg
Gold medal – first place	2023 Zagreb	60 kg
Silver medal – second place	2024 Budapest	60 kg
Bronze medal – third place	2023 Bishkek	60 kg
Bronze medal – third place	2025 Tirana	63 kg
World U23 Championships
Silver medal – second place	2021 Belgrade	60 kg
Bronze medal – third place	2018 Bucharest	60 kg
Bronze medal – third place	2019 Budapest	60 kg
Asian U23 Championship
Bronze medal – third place	2019 Ulaanbaatar	60 kg

Mehdi Seifollah Mohsen Nejad (Persian: مهدی سیف الله محسن نژاد; born 9 December 1998) is an Iranian Greco-Roman wrestler competing in the 60 kg division.

== Career ==
In November 2018, in Bucharest, defeating Armenian Armen Melikyan, he won a bronze medal at the World Under-23 Championships. A year later in Budapest at the Under-23 World Championships he again won the bronze medal, this time defeating Krisztian Kecskemeti of Hungary in the fight for third place.

Mohsennejad won his first medal at a major international competition on 19 February 2020 in New Delhi at the Asian Championships, defeating Kazakhstan's Aidos Sultangali in the 3rd place bout, becoming the bronze medallist. In April 2021, in Alma-Ata, he faced Aydos Sultangali in the final of the Asian Championships, this time he lost, winning the silver medal.

On 20 April 2022, in Ulan Bator at the Asian Championships, he reached the final, in which he lost to Zholaman Sharshenbekov from Kyrgyzstan, becoming the silver medallist.

On 22 September 2023, he lost to Zholoman Sharshenbekov in the semifinals of the World Championship in Belgrade, the next day he lost to Islomzhon Bakhromov of Uzbekistan in the fight for the bronze medal, but in the bout for the Olympic licence he defeated Gevorg Garibyan of Armenia.
