= Buglen =

Buglen Буглен Бугъулен
- Selo
- Location within Republic of Dagestan Location within Russia
- Coordinates: 42°45′N 47°11′E
- Country: Russia
- Region: Republic of Dagestan
- District: Buynaksky District
- Time zone: UTC+3:00

Buglen (Russian: Буглен; Kumyk: Бугъулен, Buğulen) is a rural locality (a selo) in Buynaksky District, Republic of Dagestan, Russia. The population was 1,998 as of 2010. There are 18 streets.

== Geography ==
Buglen is located 10 km southeast of Buynaksk (the district's administrative centre) by road, on the left bank of the Buglen-ozen River. Nizhneye Kazanishche is the nearest rural locality.
