= Abdolmohammad Papi =

Iranian wrestler (born 1987)

Personal information
- Native name: عبدالمحمد پاپی
- Full name: Abdolmohammad Papi
- Nationality: Germany
- Born: 23 August 1987 (age 39) Andimeshk, Iran
- Weight: 60 kg (132 lb)

Sport
- Country: Germany (2022 – present); Iran ( – 2021)
- Sport: Sport wrestling
- Event: Greco-Roman 60kg
- Club: Wrestling Club
Medal record
Men's Greco-Roman wrestling
Representing Iran
Asian Championships
Silver medal – second place	2013 New Delhi	60 kg
Bronze medal – third place	2011 Tashkent	60 kg

Abdolmohammad Papi (Persian: عبدالمحمد پاپى, born 23 August 1987) is an Iranian Greco-Roman wrestler who won the bronze medal in the 60 kg weight division at the 2011 Asian Wrestling Championships and bettered his performance in the 2013 Asian Wrestling Championships by winning a silver medal. In the final he lost to Elmurat Tasmuradov of Uzbekistan 5–1, 0–2, 1–3.

He began competing for Germany in 2022.
