= Victor Ciobanu =

Moldovan Greco-Roman wrestler

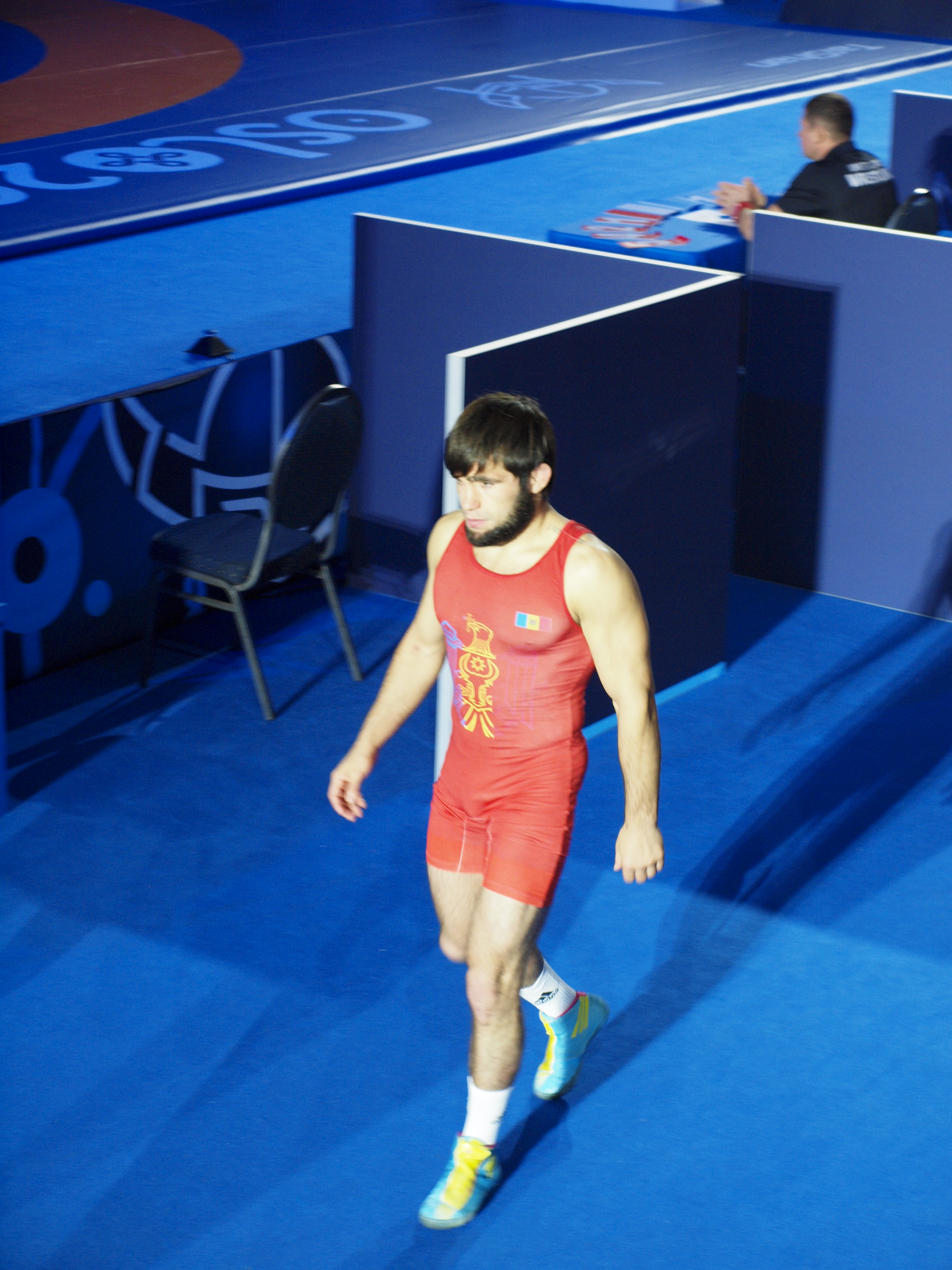
- Ciobanu at the 2021 World Championships

Personal information
- Born: October 7, 1992 (age 33) Florești, Moldova
- Height: 1.65 m (5 ft 5 in)
- Weight: 60 kg (132 lb)

Sport
- Country: Moldova
- Sport: Amateur wrestling
- Weight class: 60 kg; 63 kg
- Event: Greco-Roman
Medal record
Men's Greco-Roman wrestling
Representing Moldova
World Championships
Gold medal – first place	2021 Oslo	60 kg
Silver medal – second place	2018 Budapest	60 kg
European Championships
Gold medal – first place	2019 Bucharest	60 kg
Silver medal – second place	2014 Vantaa	59 kg
Silver medal – second place	2023 Zagreb	60 kg
Silver medal – second place	2024 Bucharest	60 kg
Disqualified	2025 Bratislava	60 kg
European Games
Bronze medal – third place	2019 Minsk	60 kg
Grand Prix
Silver medal – second place	2022 Rome	63 kg
Silver medal – second place	2024 Budapest	63 kg
Silver medal – second place	2024 Zagreb	60 kg
Bronze medal – third place	2023 Budapest	63 kg
European U23 Championships
Gold medal – first place	2015 Walbrzych	59 kg
Summer Universiade
Silver medal – second place	2013 Kazan	55 kg
European Juniors Championships
Bronze medal – third place	2012 Zagreb	55 kg

Victor Ciobanu (born 7 October 1992) is a Moldovan Greco-Roman wrestler. He won the gold medal in the 60 kg event at the 2021 World Wrestling Championships held in Oslo, Norway. He is the first wrestler representing Moldova to win a gold medal in Greco-Roman wrestling at the World Wrestling Championships.

In 2018, Ciobanu won the silver medal in the same event at the World Wrestling Championships held in Budapest, Hungary. He also won the gold medal in his event at the 2019 European Wrestling Championships in Bucharest, Romania. In 2021, Ciobanu represented Moldova at the 2020 Summer Olympics in Tokyo, Japan.

== Career ==
Ciobanu won one of the bronze medals in the 55 kg event at the 2012 European Juniors Wrestling Championships held in Zagreb, Croatia. In 2013, he lost his bronze medal match in the 55 kg event at the European Wrestling Championships held in Tbilisi, Georgia. In that same year, Ciobanu also represented Moldova at the Summer Universiade in Kazan, Russia and he won the silver medal in the 55 kg event. A few months later, he was eliminated in his second match in the 55 kg event at the 2013 World Wrestling Championships held in Budapest, Hungary.

Ciobanu won the silver medal in the 59 kg event at the 2014 European Wrestling Championships held in Vantaa, Finland. He also competed at World Wrestling Championships in 2015 and 2017 but he did not win a medal on these occasions. In 2015, Ciobanu won the gold medal in his event at the 2015 European U23 Wrestling Championships held in Walbrzych, Poland. A few months later, he lost his bronze medal match in the 59 kg event at the 2015 European Games held in Baku, Azerbaijan. In 2016, Ciobanu competed at the World Olympic Qualification Tournament in Ulaanbaatar, Mongolia hoping to qualify for the 2016 Summer Olympics in Rio de Janeiro, Brazil. He won his first match but then lost his next match against Stig-André Berge of Norway. Berge went on to win one of the bronze medals in the 59 kg event at the 2016 Summer Olympics. At the 2018 World Wrestling Championships held in Budapest, Hungary, Ciobanu won the silver medal in the 60 kg event.

At the 2019 European Wrestling Championships held in Bucharest, Romania, Ciobanu won the gold medal in the 60 kg event. In 2019, he also represented Moldova at the European Games in Minsk, Belarus and he won one of the bronze medals in the 60 kg event.

In 2020, Ciobanu competed in the 63 kg event at the European Wrestling Championships held in Rome, Italy where he was eliminated in his first match by Erik Torba of Hungary. Torba went on to win one of the bronze medals. In the same year, Ciobanu competed in the men's 60 kg event at the Individual Wrestling World Cup held in Belgrade, Serbia.

In January 2021, Ciobanu won the gold medal in the 63 kg event at the Grand Prix Zagreb Open held in Zagreb, Croatia. In March 2021, he competed at the European Qualification Tournament in Budapest, Hungary hoping to qualify for the 2020 Summer Olympics in Tokyo, Japan. He did not qualify at this tournament but, in May 2021, he was able to qualify for the Olympics at the World Olympic Qualification Tournament held in Sofia, Bulgaria. Ciobanu lost his bronze medal match in the 60 kg event at the 2020 Summer Olympics. He won his first two matches, against Kerem Kamal of Turkey and Zholaman Sharshenbekov of Kyrgyzstan, without conceding a single point. He then lost 0 – 11 against Luis Orta of Cuba and in his bronze medal match he lost against Sergey Emelin of the ROC.

Two months after the Olympics, Ciobanu won the gold medal in his event at the 2021 World Wrestling Championships held in Oslo, Norway. In the final, he defeated Zholaman Sharshenbekov of Kyrgyzstan.

In 2022, Ciobanu won the silver medal in his event at the Vehbi Emre & Hamit Kaplan Tournament held in Istanbul, Turkey. He also competed in the 63 kg event at the 2022 European Wrestling Championships in Budapest, Hungary where he was eliminated in his second match. A few months later, Ciobanu won the silver medal in his event at the Matteo Pellicone Ranking Series 2022 held in Rome, Italy.

Ciobanu won the silver medal in the 60 kg event at the 2023 European Wrestling Championships held in Zagreb, Croatia. He also won the silver medal in the 60 kg event at the 2024 European Wrestling Championships held in Bucharest, Romania. Ciobanu competed at the 2024 European Wrestling Olympic Qualification Tournament in Baku, Azerbaijan and he earned a quota place for Moldova for the 2024 Summer Olympics in Paris, France.

Ciobanu competed in the 60 kg event at the Olympics. He was eliminated in his first match by Ri Se-ung of North Korea. Ri Se-ung went on to win one of the bronze medals in the event.

== Achievements ==
Year	Tournament	Location	Result	Event
2014	European Championships	Vantaa, Finland	2nd	Greco-Roman 59 kg
2018	World Championships	Budapest, Hungary	2nd	Greco-Roman 60 kg
2019	European Championships	Bucharest, Romania	1st	Greco-Roman 60 kg
2019	European Games	Minsk, Belarus	3rd	Greco-Roman 60 kg
2021	World Championships	Oslo, Norway	1st	Greco-Roman 60 kg
2023	European Championships	Zagreb, Croatia	2nd	Greco-Roman 60 kg
2024	European Championships	Bucharest, Romania	2nd	Greco-Roman 60 kg
2025	European Championships	Bratislava, Slovakia	3rd	Greco-Roman 60 kg
