= Wuhan Sports University =

Provincial public college in Wuhan, Hubei, China

Coordinates: 30°31′17″N 114°22′22″E

- 武汉体育学院
- Former names: 中南体育学院 (Zhongnan Institute of Physical Education)
- Motto: 公勇诚毅 学思辨行 (Chinese)
- Type: Public
- Established: October 18, 1953
- Parent institution: General Administration of Sport of China; People's Government of Hubei Province
- Location: Wuhan, Hubei, China
- Campus: 299.8 acres (121.3 ha); Urban
- Colors: Red and white
- Website: www.whsu.edu.cn

UNESCO World Heritage Site
- Official name: Ancient Building Complex in the Wudang Mountains(武当山古建筑群)
- Type: Cultural Heritage
- Criteria: i, ii, vi
- About: Part of the campus is located in Wudang Mountain Tourism Economic Zone, which hosts the world heritage site.

Wuhan Sports University (武汉体育学院; 武漢體育學院; 'Wuhan Institute of Physical Education'), commonly abbreviated as "武体 (Wuhan Institute - PhysEd)", is a provincial public research and education institute in Wuhan, Hubei, China. The institute is often branded as "Wuhan Sports University" for its teaching and training programs, while it is branded as "Wuhan Institute of Physical Education" in research-related communications. It is an institute jointly established by the General Administration of Sport of China and the People's Government of Hubei Province. This institution is affiliated with Wuhan Institute Group (WIG), which is the association of ten ministerial/provincial higher education institutions in Wuhan.

The institute operates Donghu (Zhuodaoquan) Campus, Canglong Island Campus, Donghu High-tech Zone (Baoxie) Campus, and Wudang Mountain Campus. As of September 30, 2024, the total number of full-time students enrolled is 15,209 (excluding correspondence junior college and undergraduate programs), including: 205 doctoral students, 2,585 master's students, 11,907 undergraduates, 469 junior college students, and 43 international students. It also runs an affiliated college, College of Sports Science and Technology, with nearly 6,000 students. It has a directly-affiliated Grade A tertiary hospital and an operational-affiliated Grade A tertiary hospital.

The institution offers 24 undergraduate program, including subject areas in sports, arts, humanities, management, science, and engineering. It includes 3 national-level distinctive program and 4 provincial-level brand program.

The institute currently hosts 6 provincial/ministerial-level laboratories and 2 provincial collaborative innovation center platforms. It also hosts "Journal of Wuhan Institute of Physical Education" (CSSCI indexed) and the "Journal of Physical Education" (RCCSE indexed).

== History ==
Wuhan Sports University's origins can be traced back to Zhongnan Institute of Physical Education, in Nanchang City, Jiangxi province. The Zhongnan Institute was formed in 1953. Shortly after, in 1955, the institute moved to its present site in Wuhan, Hubei Province, and changed its name to the Wuhan Institute of Physical Education (WIPE) in February 1956. WIPE was formerly administered by the National General Administration of Sports and, now it turned to be under the administration of both the National General Administration of Sports and the Hubei Provincial Government in the year 2001. In the year 1985, WIPE started its first art major; Sport Management. Since then several other art majors emerged, such as sport psychology, sport English and sport Economics, till the newest Sport Advertising. And this is a quintessence of ongoing reform of Tertiary educational institutions in China, whose aim is to combine USSR-style specific school into comprehensive institution.

== Academics ==
=== Reputation and Rankings ===
Wuhan Sports University enjoys a solid reputation in China’s sports education and research landscape. It is especially renowned for its sports education research, computational sports science research, and contributions to elite athlete development.

In 2023, It was ranked amont the top 200 institutions worldwide in 2023 Global Ranking of Sport Science Schools and Departments and placed 4th nationally in China according to the XYH 2023 China Physical Education University Ranking.

=== Academic Organization structure ===
The institute has 8 colleges, 2 faculties, 3 departments and 2 schools, 15 educational and teaching units. The names of these units are listed as follow:

- Physical Education College (Chinese: 体育教育学院)
- Sports Training College (Chinese: 运动训练学院)
- Chinese Martial Arts College (Chinese: 武术学院)
- Gymnastics College (Chinese: 体育艺术学院)
- School of Sports Economy & Management (Chinese: 体育经济管理学院)
- College of Health Science (Chinese: 健康科学学院)
- Competitive Sports School (Chinese: 竞技体育学院)
- Adult Education School (Chinese: 成教学院)
- Sports Information & Technology Faculty (Chinese: 体育信息技术系)
- Sports Journalism & Foreign Language Faculty (Chinese: 体育新闻与外语系)
- the Postgraduate Department (Chinese: 研究生部)
- Political Theory Department (Chinese: 政治理论课部)
- Training Department (Chinese: 培训部)

Since 2006, WIPE launched its 3+1 cooperative education programme with University of the West of England. Students enrolled as its "3+1" project participants will study at Wuhan for the first 3 years and then go to UWE for the last year of study. In autumn semester of 2009, the first 15 students participated in the 3+1 project in 2006 were sent to UWE. WIPE was largely aimed for education of undergraduate level, and its graduate school, though famous in a time during the 1980s, was increasingly eclipsed by Beijing Sports University. However, in 2006, WIPE was authorized for the conferment of doctor's degree.

== School Assets ==
As of December 31, 2024, Wuhan Sports University occupies a building area of 657,862.91 square meters, of which: the office building area is 16,907.16 square meters, and others are 640,955.75 square meters. There are 21 official vehicles, including 2 vehicles for main leading cadres, 8 vehicles for emergency support, 3 vehicles for special professional technical use, and 8 other vehicles. The other vehicles are mainly non-motorized vehicles such as two-wheeled electric campus patrol vehicles and garbage collection electric vehicles. There are 83 units (sets) of general equipment with a unit price of over 500,000 yuan, and 32 units (sets) of special equipment with a unit price of over 1 million yuan.

=== Natatorium ===
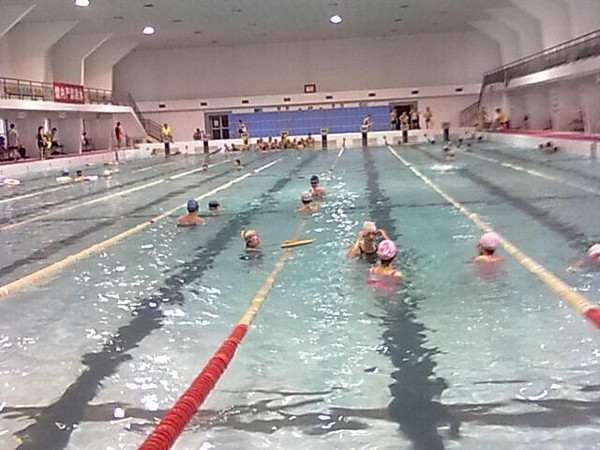
Interior of the swimming pool

Institute's indoor swimming pool, constructed in 1984 and put into service since 1986, is a combination of public and competition pool. The pool is maintained in constant temperature. It was then the largest swimming pool in China equipped with solar heating system, which were able to heat 70 tons of hot water daily according to its original design. Affiliated to and overseen by teaching and researching section of swimming in the institution, the Swimming pool have been run by a private contractor., especially in summer. Athletes here have competed in different level of swimming event as well as less publicized fin swimming competition, having attained phenomenal accomplishments such as 10 world champions. There were 6 world records, 4 Asian records and 5 national records kept here.

Recently criticisms arose in the local media concerning the health regulation in swimming pool, including natatorium. Critics said local swimming pools lacked proper sanitation of water, and inadequately checked Health Certificate of visitors as was required by law. One of the employees here contended that

“财力有限，若配备专业医生，费用难承担；并且，根据业内“潜规则”：游泳是不需要《健康证》的。”
Roughly Translated as: With limited wherewithal, a doctor can't be afforded; moreover, according to industrial norms, there is no need of Health Certificate beforehand to swim.

== Present ==
Wuhan Sports University has a total staff of 812, of which over 500 are professional teachers and trainers. This includes over 60 are professor and/or national trainers; 165 are associate professors; 3 are for Chutian Scholar visiting professors; 10 are Hubei Outstanding Contributions Experts; 10 experts get the subsidy of the State Council and provincial government. In October 2009, Prof. Walter Brehm, the dean of the Sport Institute of University of Bayreuth of Germany, was provided a visiting professor tenure.

At Wuhan Sports University, there are all kinds of indoors and outdoors sports buildings, classrooms buildings, and advanced research facilities. Furthermore, books in the library are up to more than 800,000 volumes.
