= Kenichiro Fumita =

Japanese Greco-Roman wrestler

Personal information
- Born: 18 December 1995 (age 30) Yamanashi, Japan
- Height: 1.68 m (5 ft 6 in)
- Weight: 60 kg (132 lb)

Sport
- Country: Japan
- Sport: Greco-Roman wrestling
- Weight class: 60 kg
Medal record
Men's Greco-Roman wrestling
Representing Japan
Olympic Games
Gold medal – first place	2024 Paris	60 kg
Silver medal – second place	2020 Tokyo	60 kg
World Championships
Gold medal – first place	2017 Paris	59 kg
Gold medal – first place	2019 Nur-Sultan	60 kg
Silver medal – second place	2023 Belgrade	60 kg
Bronze medal – third place	2022 Belgrade	60 kg
Asian Championships
Gold medal – first place	2017 New Delhi	59 kg
Bronze medal – third place	2019 Xian	60 kg
Gold medal – first place	2020 New Delhi	60 kg
World U23 Championships
Gold medal – first place	2018 Bucharest	60 kg

Kenichiro Fumita (文田 健一郎, Fumita Ken'ichirō; born 18 December 1995) is a Japanese Greco-Roman wrestler. He won the gold medal in the 60 kg event at the 2024 Summer Olympics in Paris, France. In 2017, he won a gold medal at Paris World Wrestling Championships in 59 kg.

== Awards ==
- Tokyo Sports
  - Wrestling Special Award (2017)
