= Raiber Rodríguez =

Venezuelan Greco-Roman wrestler

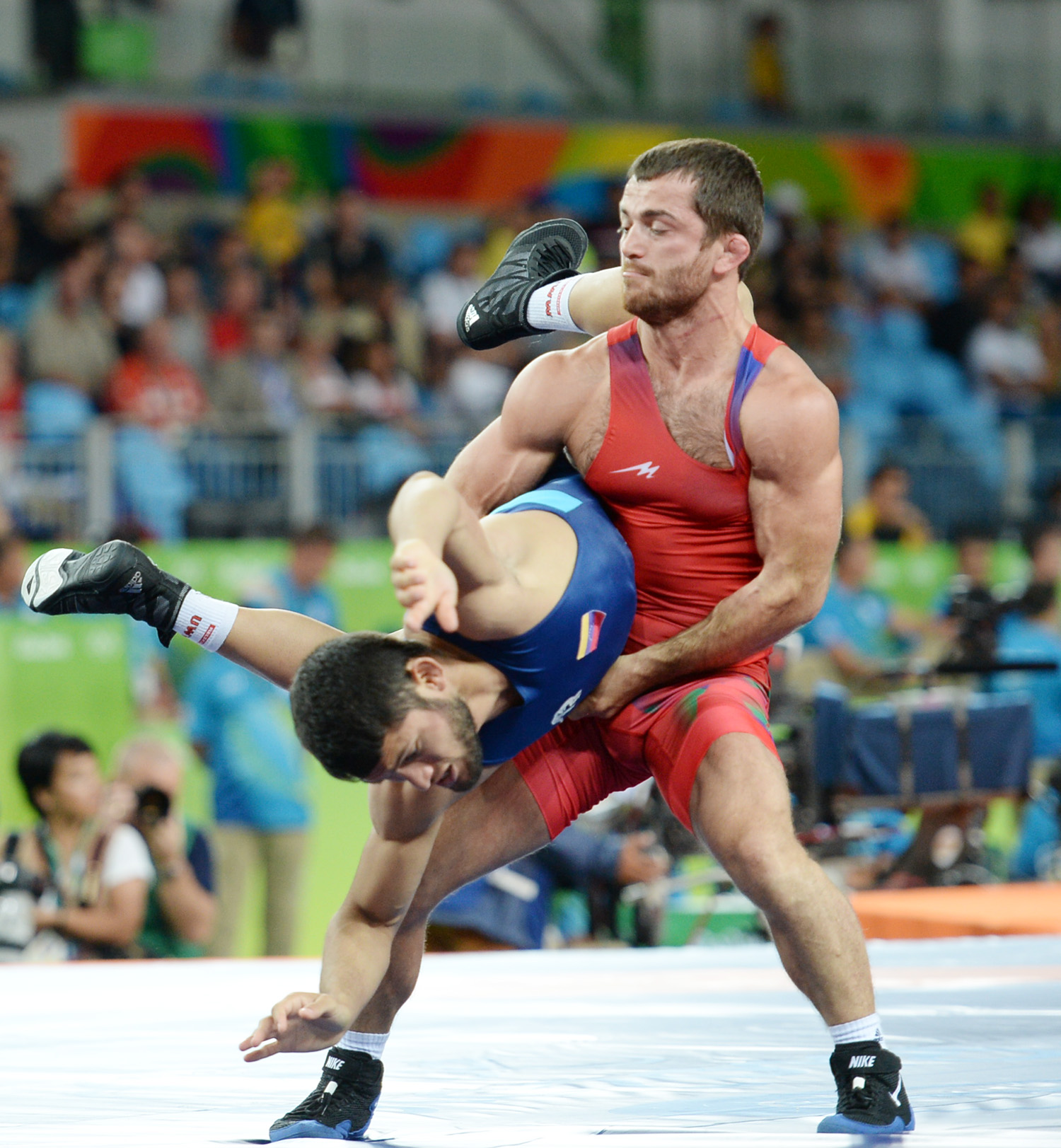
- Rodríguez (down) against Bayramov during the 2016 Olympics

Personal information
- Full name: Raiber José Rodríguez Orozco
- Born: 28 December 1990 (age 35) Barinas, Venezuela

Sport
- Sport: Greco-Roman wrestling
Medal record
Representing Venezuela
Pan American Games
Bronze medal – third place	2023 Santiago	60kg
Pan American Championships
Gold medal – first place	2024 Acapulco	60kg
Bronze medal – third place	2023 Buenos Aires	60kg
Bronze medal – third place	2016 Frisco	66kg
South American Games
Bronze medal – third place	2022 Asunción	60 kg
Central American and Caribbean Games
Bronze medal – third place	2023 San Salvador	60 kg
Bronze medal – third place	2026 Santo Domingo	60 kg
Grand Prix
Bronze medal – third place	2024 Budapest	63 kg

Raiber José Rodríguez Orozco (Note: In this Spanish name, the first or paternal surname is Rodríguez and the second or maternal family name is Orozco.) (born 28 December 1990) is a Venezuelan Greco-Roman wrestler. He competed in the men's Greco-Roman 59 kg event at the 2016 Summer Olympics, in which he was eliminated by Rovshan Bayramov.

Rodríguez won one of the bronze medals in the 60 kg event at the 2023 Pan American Games held in Santiago, Chile. He defeated Cristóbal Torres of Chile in his bronze medal match.

Rodríguez won the gold medal in his event at the 2024 Pan American Wrestling Championships held in Acapulco, Mexico. A few days later, at the Pan American Wrestling Olympic Qualification Tournament held in Acapulco, Mexico, he earned a quota place for Venezuela for the 2024 Summer Olympics held in Paris, France. He lost his bronze medal match in the 60 kg event at the Olympics.
