= Ri Se-ung =

North Korean Greco-Roman wrestler

Personal information
- Nationality: North Korea
- Born: 22 December 1998 (age 27) Pyongyang, North Korea
- Height: 168 cm (5 ft 6 in)

Sport
- Country: North Korea
- Sport: Amateur wrestling
- Weight class: 60 kg
- Event: Greco-Roman
Medal record
Men's Greco-Roman wrestling
Representing North Korea
Olympic Games
| Bronze medal – third place | 2024 Paris | 60 kg |
World Championships
| Bronze medal – third place | 2025 Zagreb | 60 kg |
Asian Championships
| Gold medal – first place | 2025 Amman | 60 kg |
| Silver medal – second place | 2018 Bishkek | 60 kg |
| Silver medal – second place | 2019 Xi'an | 60 kg |
| Silver medal – second place | 2026 Bishkek | 60 kg |
Asian Games
| Bronze medal – third place | 2022 Hangzhou | 60 kg |
Military World Games
| Gold medal – first place | 2019 Wuhan | 60 kg |
World Military Championships
| Silver medal – second place | 2024 Yerevan | 60 kg |
Summer Youth Olympics
| Gold medal – first place | 2014 Nanjing | 42 kg |

Ri Se-ung (born 22 December 1998) is a North Korean Greco-Roman wrestler. He won one of the bronze medals in the 60 kg event at the 2024 Summer Olympics in Paris, France. He is a three-time medalist, including gold, at the Asian Wrestling Championships in the men's 60 kg event.

== Career ==
Ri won the gold medal in the men's 42 kg event at the 2014 Summer Youth Olympics held in Nanjing, China.

In 2019, Ri represented North Korea at the Military World Games held in Wuhan, China and he won the gold medal in the 60 kg event.

Ri won one of the bronze medals in the 60 kg event at the 2022 Asian Games held in Hangzhou, China. He defeated Aidos Sultangali of Kazakhstan in his bronze medal match.

He competed at the 2024 Asian Wrestling Olympic Qualification Tournament in Bishkek, Kyrgyzstan and he earned a quota place for North Korea for the 2024 Summer Olympics in Paris, France. He won one of the bronze medals in the 60 kg event at the Olympics. He defeated Raiber Rodríguez of Venezuela in his bronze medal match.
