= Anvar Allakhiarov =

Russian Greco-Roman wrestler (born 2000)

Anvar Allakhiarov Анвар Аллахьяров
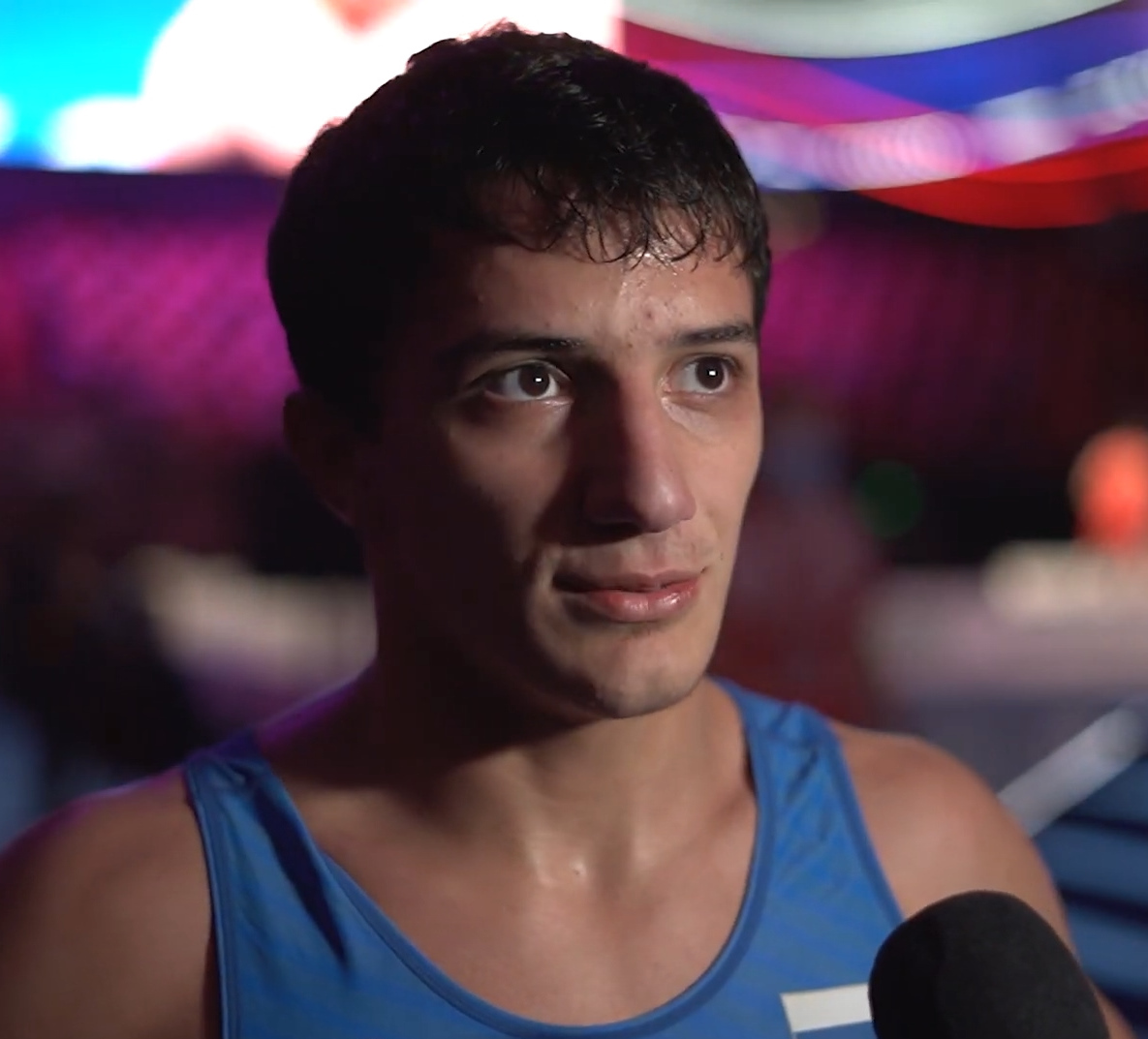
- Anvar in 2020

Personal information
- Native name: Russian: Анвар Эдуардович Аллахьяров
- Full name: Anvar Eduardovich Allakhiarov
- Nationality: Russian
- Born: 5 October 2000 (age 25) Akhty, Dagestan, Russia

Sport
- Country: Russia
- Sport: Wrestling
- Weight class: 60kg
- Rank: International master of sports
- Event: Greco-Roman
- Club: Olympic Training Center (Khimki, Moscow Oblast)
- Coached by: Aleksey Krasavin; Viktor Trifonov
Medal record
Men's Greco-Roman wrestling
Representing Individual Neutral Athletes
European Championships
Bronze medal – third place	2024 Bucharest	63 kg
Representing Russia
CIS Games
Gold medal – first place	2023 Salihorsk	60 kg
U23 World Championships
Gold medal – first place	2021 Belgrade	60 kg
U23 European Championships
Gold medal – first place	2021 Skopje	60 kg
U23 World Championships
Gold medal – first place	2023 Tirana	60 kg
Representing Moscow Oblast
Russian National Championships
Bronze medal – third place	2019 Kaliningrad	55 kg
Silver medal – second place	2021 Rostov-on-Don	60 kg
Silver medal – second place	2022 Suzdal	60 kg

Anvar Eduardovich Allakhiarov (Russian: Анвар Эдуардович Аллахьяров; born 5 October 2000) is a Russian Greco-Roman wrestler of Lezgin origin, who competes at the 60 kg category on the international circuit. 2024 European bronze medalist. He is the 2021-2022 Russian national championships runner-up and 2x U23 world champion.

== Background ==
Anvar was born in lezgin village, Akhty, Dagestan. In elementary school, he started Greco-Roman wrestling in Makhachkala, Dagestan then moved to Zelenograd, Moscow Oblast and trained in sport school No.111. In present, he lives and trains in Khimki.

== Sport career ==
Anvar has the silver medal from the 2016 Cadet European Championships. In 2017, he won the bronze medal at the Cadet World Championships. In January 2019, Anvar earned the bronze medal at the senior Russian National Championships. In June 2019, he took the silver medal at the Junior European Championships in Spain. In August 2019, he became junior world champion in Estonia. In January 2021, he won the silver medal at the Russian nationals, In April 2021, he became U23 Russian national champion, in the final match he over Georgii Tibilov of North Ossetia-Alania. In May 2021, he took the gold medal at the U23 European Championships in North Macedonia. In November 2021, he won the U23 World Championships in Serbia In February 2022, he was runner-up at the senior Russian National Championships, in the final match he was defeated by Olympian Sergey Emelin. In 2023, Allakhiarov won the CIS Games in Belarus and U23 world championships in Albania. Also, he competed at the 2023 World Championships. In February 2024, he won the bronze medal at the 2024 European Championships. He competed at the 2024 European Wrestling Olympic Qualification Tournament in Baku, Azerbaijan hoping to qualify for the 2024 Summer Olympics in Paris, France.

== Wrestling achievements ==
- Senior level:
  - 2019 Russian National Championships — 3rd;
  - 2021 Russian National Championships — 2nd;
  - 2021 U23 European Championships — 1st;
  - 2021 U23 World Championships — 1st;
  - 2022 Russian National Championships — 2nd;
  - 2023 CIS Games — 1st;
  - 2023 U23 World Championships — 1st;
  - 2024 Grand Prix Zagreb Open — 3rd;
  - 2024 European Championships — 3rd;
- Junior level:
  - 2019 European Championships — 2nd;
  - 2019 World Championships — 1st;

== Personal life ==
Anvar has a twin brother, Yanvar.
