= Jamal Valizadeh =

Iranian Greco-Roman wrestler (born 1991)

Personal information
- Born: 26 September 1991 (age 34) Kermanshah, Iran
- Education: University of Lorraine

Sport
- Country: (International Olympic Committee) Refugee Olympic Team
- Sport: Wrestling
- Weight class: 60 kg
- Event: Greco-Roman

Jamal Valizadeh (Persian: جمال ولی‌زاده; born 26 September 1991) is an Iranian wrestler. He was selected for the 2024 Summer Olympics as a member of the Refugee Olympic Team.

== Biography ==
Valizadeh was born in 1991 in Kermanshah, Iran. He grew up in the village of Takhti and attended school in Sanandaj. He was the only boy of 34 cousins who was initially not a wrestler; instead, he competed in handball as a goalkeeper, before being convinced to try out the sport at age 11. He trained with his family each day and joined a club in Takhti, later beating the regional champion in his first year in the sport. He quickly showed talent in the sport, competing in Greco-Roman events, and won the national championship in the 55 kg category each year from 2011 to 2013.

In 2014, Valizadeh attended a Kurd demonstration protesting the Islamic State. He witnessed "the police [...] hitting the women and children," and intervened. He recalled that "I threw myself between the legs of one of the officers, I used a wrestling technique on him." However, he was overpowered and imprisoned, where he was tortured for two weeks. Describing it as "hell," he later noted in Le Parisien:

I was interrogated, and they beat me when I didn't know what to answer to their questions [...] The worst part was the sleep deprivation. They let me rest for twenty minutes, then took me out of the cell to question me. I found myself in a cell where it was impossible to sit down. When you are forced to stand without sleeping for 24 hours, you go crazy. I was released on bail, but with the certainty of being convicted.

Validezah went into hiding in Tehran for six months, while working jobs to earn money so that he could pay someone to smuggle him to Turkey. In Turkey, he recalled that he "worked 16 hours a day, earning only 1,000 dollars after six months. [The employers] gave me $300 a month and I had to buy my own food ... they abused me, they did not respect me, they spoke badly to me." He said "it was really hard," but that it was necessary to earn money to continue his journey. In the winter of 2015, Valizadeh crossed the Mediterranean Sea on boat with other refugees; however, the boat started to sink and he had to swim several hundred metres to reach his destination. He arrived in France on 1 January 2016 and later stayed at a shelter in Le Mans, receiving political refugee status.

Valizadeh learned French and worked as a forklift driver in a supermarket for several years. He also enrolled at the University of Lorraine, studying information technology (IT). In January 2023, following eight years away from wrestling, he returned to the sport and joined a club in France. He competed at six international tournaments that year representing the United World Wrestling (UWW) refugee team, including at the World Wrestling Championships and European Wrestling Championships. He received an International Olympic Committee (IOC) scholarship and began training with the French national team multiple times a week. In May 2024, he was announced as a member of the Refugee Olympic Team to compete at the 2024 Summer Olympics for the 60 kg Greco-Roman event.
