= Zholaman Sharshenbekov =

Kyrgyz Greco-Roman wrestler

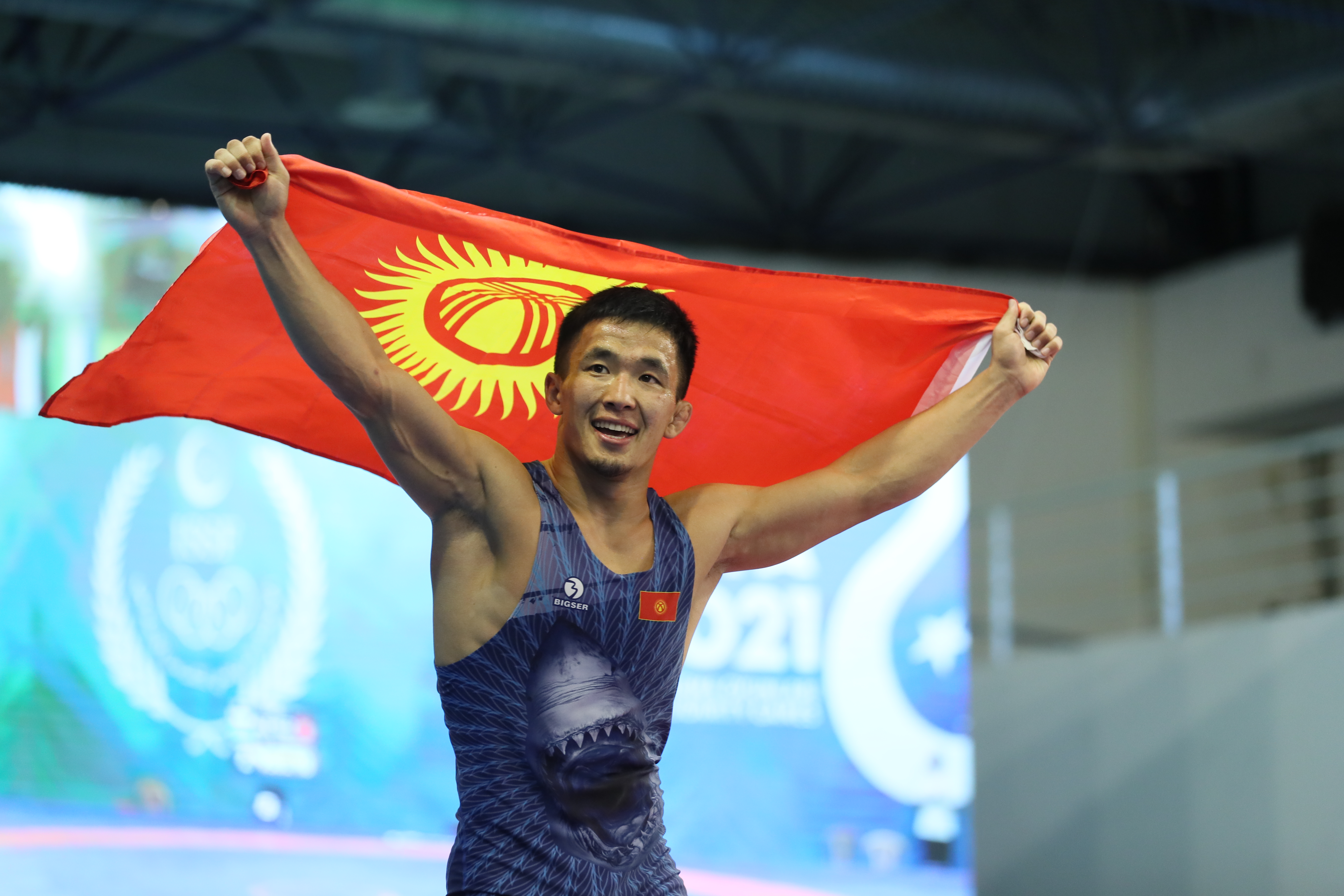

Personal information
- Full name: Zholaman Nazarbekovich Sharshenbekov
- Nationality: Kyrgyzstan
- Born: Шаршенбеков Жоламан Назарбекович; 29 September 1999 (age 27) Talas, Kyrgyzstan
- Height: 164 cm (5 ft 5 in)

Sport
- Country: Kyrgyzstan
- Sport: Wrestling
- Weight class: 60 kg
- Event: Greco-Roman
- Coached by: Hakim Makhmudov
Medal record
Men's Greco-Roman wrestling
Representing Kyrgyzstan
Olympic Games
Bronze medal – third place	2024 Paris	60 kg
World Championships
Gold medal – first place	2022 Belgrade	60 kg
Gold medal – first place	2023 Belgrade	60 kg
Silver medal – second place	2018 Budapest	55 kg
Silver medal – second place	2021 Oslo	60 kg
Asian Championships
Gold medal – first place	2022 Ulaanbaatar	60 kg
Gold medal – first place	2023 Astana	60 kg
Gold medal – first place	2024 Bishkek	60 kg
Silver medal – second place	2018 Bishkek	55 kg
Silver medal – second place	2020 New Delhi	60 kg
Asian Games
Gold medal – first place	2022 Hangzhou	60 kg
Gold medal – first place	2026 Aichi–Nagoya	60 kg
Islamic Solidarity Games
Gold medal – first place	2021 Konya	60 kg
Individual World Cup
Gold medal – first place	2020 Belgrade	60 kg
Grand Prix
Gold medal – first place	2026 Ulaanbaatar	63 kg
Vehbi Emre & Hamit Kaplan Tournament
Gold medal – first place	2024 Antalya	60 kg
Silver medal – second place	2021 Istanbul	60 kg
Dan Kolov - Nikola Petrov Tournament
Gold medal – first place	2023 Sofia	60 kg
Bronze medal – third place	2019 Ruse	60 kg
Bronze medal – third place	2022 Veliko Tarnovo	60 kg
Bolat Turlykhanov Cup
Bronze medal – third place	2022 Almaty	63 kg
World U23 Championships
Silver medal – second place	2019 Budapest	60 kg
Asian U23 Championship
Gold medal – first place	2019 Ulaanbaatar	60 kg

Zholaman Sharshenbekov (born 29 September 1999) is a Kyrgyz Greco-Roman wrestler. He won one of the bronze medals in the 60 kg event at the 2024 Summer Olympics in Paris, France. He is a four-time medalist, including two gold medals, at the World Wrestling Championships (2018, 2021, 2022, 2023). He is also a five-time medalist, including three gold medals, at the Asian Wrestling Championships (2018, 2020, 2022, 2023, 2024).

== Career ==
In 2020, he won the gold medal in the 60 kg event at the Individual Wrestling World Cup held in Belgrade, Serbia.

In 2022, Sharshenbekov won one of the bronze medals in the 60 kg event at the Dan Kolov & Nikola Petrov Tournament held in Veliko Tarnovo, Bulgaria. He won the gold medal in his event at the 2022 Asian Wrestling Championships held in Ulaanbaatar, Mongolia. He won the gold medal in his event at the 2021 Islamic Solidarity Games held in Konya, Turkey. He won the gold medal in the 60 kg event at the 2022 World Wrestling Championships held in Belgrade, Serbia.

Sharshenbekov won the gold medal in the 60 kg event at the 2022 Asian Games held in Hangzhou, China. He defeated Ayata Suzuki of Japan in his gold medal match.

== Achievements ==
Year	Tournament	Venue	Result	Event
2018	Asian Championships	Bishkek, Kyrgyzstan	2nd	Greco-Roman 55 kg
2018	World Championships	Budapest, Hungary	2nd	Greco-Roman 55 kg
2019	U23 World Championship	Budapest, Hungary	2nd	Greco-Roman 60 kg
2020	Asian Championships	New Delhi, India	2nd	Greco-Roman 60 kg
2021	Olympic Games	Tokyo, Japan	7th	Greco-Roman 60 kg
2021	World Championships	Oslo, Norway	2nd	Greco-Roman 60 kg
2022	Asian Championships	Ulaanbaatar, Mongolia	1st	Greco-Roman 60 kg
2022	Islamic Solidarity Games	Konya, Turkey	1st	Greco-Roman 60 kg
2022	World Championships	Belgrade, Serbia	1st	Greco-Roman 60 kg
2023	Dan Kolov Nikola Petrov Tournament	Sofia, Bulgaria	1st	Greco-Roman 60 kg
2023	Asian Championships	Astana, Kazakhstan	1st	Greco-Roman 60 kg
2023	World Championships	Belgrade, Serbia	1st	Greco-Roman 60 kg
2023	Asian Games	Hangzhou, China	1st	Greco-Roman 60 kg
2024	Asian Championships	Bishkek, Kyrgyzstan	1st	Greco-Roman 60 kg
2024	Olympic Games	Paris, France	3rd	Greco-Roman 60 kg
2026	Asian Games	Nagoya, Japan	1st	Greco-Roman 60 kg
