= Mehrdad Mardani =

Iranian wrestler (born 1992)

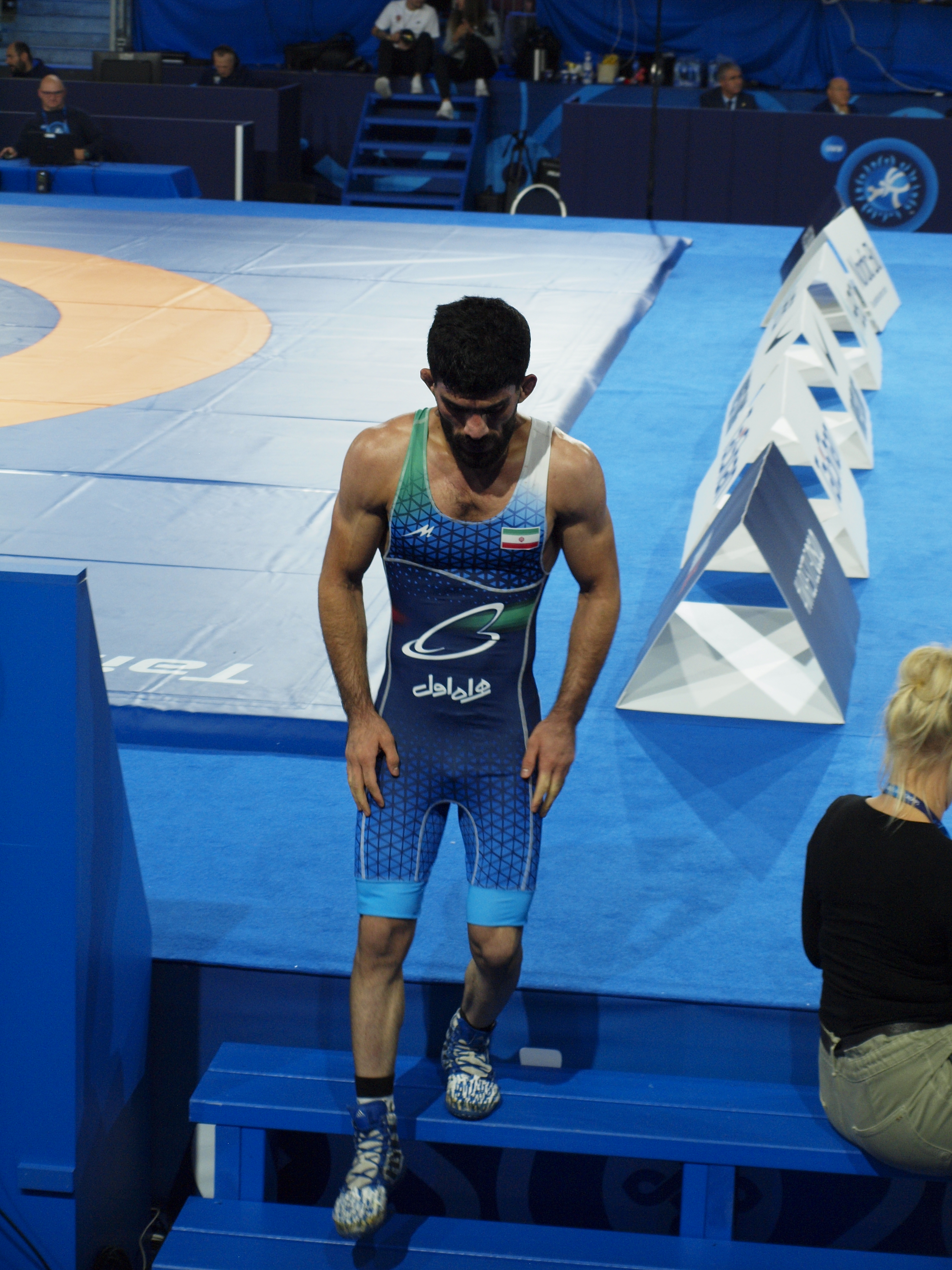
- Mardani at the 2021 World Championship

Personal information
- Native name: مهرداد مردانی
- Full name: Mehrdad Mardani
- Born: 22 June 1992 (age 34) Izeh, Khuzestan, Iran
- Height: 1.60 m (5 ft 3 in)
- Website: Official Instagram Profile

Sport
- Sport: Amateur wrestling
- Event: Greco-Roman
- Coached by: Loghman Rezaei
Medal record
Representing Iran
Men's Greco-Roman wrestling
Asian Games
Bronze medal – third place	2018 Jakarta	60 kg

Mehrdad Mardani (Persian: مهرداد مردانی, born 22 June 1992) is a professional Iranian wrestler. He won bronze medals at the 2018 Asian Games.
