= 2022 World Wrestling Championships – Men's Greco-Roman 60 kg =

Wrestling competitions

Men's Greco-Roman 60 kg at the 2022 World Championships
- Venue: Štark Arena
- Dates: 12–13 September 2022
- Competitors: 29 from 29 nations

Medalists
gold medal	Zholaman Sharshenbekov	Kyrgyzstan
silver medal	Edmond Nazaryan	Bulgaria
bronze medal	Aidos Sultangali	Kazakhstan
bronze medal	Kenichiro Fumita	Japan

The men's Greco-Roman 60 kilograms is a competition featured at the 2022 World Wrestling Championships, and was held in Belgrade, Serbia on 12 and 13 September 2022.

This Greco-Roman wrestling competition consists of a single-elimination tournament, with a repechage used to determine the winner of two bronze medals. The two finalists face off for gold and silver medals. Each wrestler who loses to one of the two finalists moves into the repechage, culminating in a pair of bronze medal matches featuring the semifinal losers each facing the remaining repechage opponent from their half of the bracket.

== Results ==
Legend

- F — Won by fall

=== Final ===
Final
Zholaman Sharshenbekov (KGZ)	11
Edmond Nazaryan (BUL)	2

=== Top half ===
Round of 32
Marat Garipov (BRA)	0
Krisztián Kecskeméti (HUN)	9
Ildar Hafizov (USA)	9
Dicther Toro (COL)	6
Michał Tracz (POL)	4
Helary Mägisalu (EST)	1
Gyanender Dahiya (IND)	6
Léo Tudezca (FRA)	4
Cao Liguo (CHN)	9
Abdelkarim Fergat (ALG)	0
Aidos Sultangali (KAZ)	9^{F}
Alexandru Trandafir (ROU)	0
Pridon Abuladze (GEO)	2
Gevorg Gharibyan (ARM)	8^{F}

Round of 16
Zholaman Sharshenbekov (KGZ)	8
Krisztián Kecskeméti (HUN)	0
Ildar Hafizov (USA)	7
Michał Tracz (POL)	1
Gyanender Dahiya (IND)	0
Cao Liguo (CHN)	11
Aidos Sultangali (KAZ)	3^{F}
Gevorg Gharibyan (ARM)	0

Quarterfinals
Zholaman Sharshenbekov (KGZ)	4^{F}
Ildar Hafizov (USA)	0
Cao Liguo (CHN)	1
Aidos Sultangali (KAZ)	7

Semifinals
Zholaman Sharshenbekov (KGZ)	7
Aidos Sultangali (KAZ)	0

=== Bottom half ===
Round of 32
Etienne Kinsinger (GER)	3
Ardit Fazljija (SWE)	1
Mehdi Mohsennejad (IRI)	8^{F}
Chung Han-jae (KOR)	0
Ilkhom Bakhromov (UZB)	0
Kerem Kamal (TUR)	9
Haithem Mahmoud (EGY)	12
Kevin de Armas (CUB)	2
Edmond Nazaryan (BUL)	11
Justas Petravičius (LTU)	0
Viktor Petryk (UKR)	9
Rabby Kilandi (COD)	11

Round of 16
Kenichiro Fumita (JPN)	9
Etienne Kinsinger (GER)	5
Mehdi Mohsennejad (IRI)	9
Kerem Kamal (TUR)	4^{F}
Haithem Mahmoud (EGY)	1
Edmond Nazaryan (BUL)	2
Rabby Kilandi (COD)	0
Murad Mammadov (AZE)	9

Quarterfinals
Kenichiro Fumita (JPN)	6
Kerem Kamal (TUR)	3
Edmond Nazaryan (BUL)	2
Murad Mammadov (AZE)	1

Semifinals
Kenichiro Fumita (JPN)	5
Edmond Nazaryan (BUL)	5

=== Repechage ===
Repechage round 1
Justas Petravičius (LTU)	11
Haithem Mahmoud (EGY)	1

Repechage round 2
Krisztián Kecskeméti (HUN)	9
Ildar Hafizov (USA)	0
Justas Petravičius (LTU)	3
Murad Mammadov (AZE)	9

Bronze medals
Krisztián Kecskeméti (HUN)	1
Aidos Sultangali (KAZ)	7
Murad Mammadov (AZE)	1
Kenichiro Fumita (JPN)	5

== Final standing ==
Rank	Athlete
1st place, gold medalist(s)	Zholaman Sharshenbekov (KGZ)
2nd place, silver medalist(s)	Edmond Nazaryan (BUL)
3rd place, bronze medalist(s)	Aidos Sultangali (KAZ)
3rd place, bronze medalist(s)	Kenichiro Fumita (JPN)
5	Krisztián Kecskeméti (HUN)
5	Murad Mammadov (AZE)
7	Kerem Kamal (TUR)
8	Cao Liguo (CHN)
9	Haithem Mahmoud (EGY)
10	Ildar Hafizov (USA)
11	Mehdi Mohsennejad (IRI)
12	Gevorg Gharibyan (ARM)
13	Justas Petravičius (LTU)
14	Etienne Kinsinger (GER)
15	Michał Tracz (POL)
16	Rabby Kilandi (COD)
17	Gyanender Dahiya (IND)
18	Viktor Petryk (UKR)
19	Dicther Toro (COL)
20	Léo Tudezca (FRA)
21	Kevin de Armas (CUB)
22	Ardit Fazljija (SWE)
23	Helary Mägisalu (EST)
24	Pridon Abuladze (GEO)
25	Chung Han-jae (KOR)
26	Marat Garipov (BRA)
27	Abdelkarim Fergat (ALG)
28	Alexandru Trandafir (ROU)
29	Ilkhom Bakhromov (UZB)
