= 2023 European Wrestling Championships – Men's Greco-Roman 60 kg =

Wrestling competition

Men's Greco-Roman 60 kg at the 2023 European Wrestling Championships
- Venue: Arena Zagreb
- Location: Zagreb, Croatia
- Dates: 22-23 April
- Competitors: 22

Medalists
gold medal	Edmond Nazaryan	Bulgaria
silver medal	Victor Ciobanu	Moldova
bronze medal	Nihat Mammadli	Azerbaijan
bronze medal	Georgii Tibilov	Serbia

The Men's Greco-Roman 60 kg is a competition featured at the 2023 European Wrestling Championships, and will held in Zagreb, Croatia on April 22 and 23.

== Results ==
Legend

- F — Won by fall

=== Final ===
Final
Edmond Nazaryan (BUL)	13
Victor Ciobanu (MDA)	0

=== Top half ===
Round of 32
Erik Torba (HUN)	3
Helary Mägisalu (EST)	1
Ardit Fazljija (SWE)	3
Nikolai Mohammadi (DEN)	9
Mihael Bešenić (CRO)	9
Daniel Bobillo (ESP)	0

Round of 16
Edmond Nazaryan (BUL)	7
Nihat Mammadli (AZE)	3
Erik Torba (HUN)	9
Jamal Valizadeh (UWW)	0
Gevorg Gharibyan (ARM)	9
Nikolai Mohammadi (DEN)	1
Mihael Bešenić (CRO)	3
Justas Petravičius (LTU)	10^{F}

Quarterfinals
Edmond Nazaryan (BUL)	8
Erik Torba (HUN)	0
Gevorg Gharibyan (ARM)	WO
Justas Petravičius (LTU)

Semifinals
Edmond Nazaryan (BUL)	5
Gevorg Gharibyan (ARM)	1

=== Bottom half ===
Round of 32
Melkamu Fetene (ISR)	0
Pridon Abuladze (GEO)	8
Viktor Petryk (UKR)	1
Georgii Tibilov (SRB)	9
Christopher Kraemer (GER)	5
Victor Ciobanu (MDA)	10

Round of 16
Răzvan Arnăut (ROU)	4
Pridon Abuladze (GEO)	5
Georgii Tibilov (SRB)	5
Michał Tracz (POL)	0
Léo Tudezca (FRA)	0
Victor Ciobanu (MDA)	8
Bajram Sina (ALB)	0
Kerem Kamal (TUR)	9

Quarterfinals
Pridon Abuladze (GEO)	2
Georgii Tibilov (SRB)	5
Victor Ciobanu (MDA)	17^{F}
Kerem Kamal (TUR)	8

Semifinals
Georgii Tibilov (SRB)	2
Victor Ciobanu (MDA)	5

Repechage round 1
Christopher Kraemer (GER)	4
Léo Tudezca (FRA)	2

Repechage round 2
Erik Torba (HUN)	0
Nihat Mammadli (AZE)	7
Christopher Kraemer (GER)	0
Kerem Kamal (TUR)	9

Bronze medal match
Nihat Mammadli (AZE)	10
Gevorg Gharibyan (ARM)	5
Kerem Kamal (TUR)	3
Georgii Tibilov (SRB)	7

== Final standing ==
Rank	Athlete
1st place, gold medalist(s)	Edmond Nazaryan (BUL)
2nd place, silver medalist(s)	Victor Ciobanu (MDA)
3rd place, bronze medalist(s)	Nihat Mammadli (AZE)
3rd place, bronze medalist(s)	Georgii Tibilov (SRB)
5	Kerem Kamal (TUR)
5	Gevorg Gharibyan (ARM)
7	Pridon Abuladze (GEO)
8	Erik Torba (HUN)
9	Justas Petravičius (LTU)
10	Mihael Bešenić (CRO)
11	Nikolai Mohammadi (DEN)
12	Christopher Kraemer (GER)
13	Răzvan Arnăut (ROU)
14	Ardit Fazljija (SWE)
15	Léo Tudezca (FRA)
16	Helary Mägisalu (EST)
17	Viktor Petryk (UKR)
18	Michał Tracz (POL)
19	Melkamu Fetene (ISR)
20	Jamal Valizadeh (UWW)
21	Daniel Bobillo (ESP)
22	Bajram Sina (ALB)
