= 2021 European Wrestling Championships – Men's Greco-Roman 60 kg =

Wrestling competition

The Men's Greco-Roman 60 kg is a competition featured at the 2021 European Wrestling Championships, and was held in Warsaw, Poland on April 24 and April 25.

== Medalists ==
Gold	Sergey Emelin; Russia
Silver	Kerem Kamal; Turkey
Bronze	Viktor Petryk; Ukraine
Bronze	Răzvan Arnăut; Romania

== Results ==
Legend

- F — Won by fall

1/8 finals
Sergey Emelin (RUS)	9
Grzegorz Kunkel (POL)	0
Gevorg Gharibyan (ARM)	13
Irakli Dzimistarishvili (GEO)	5
Răzvan Arnăut (ROU)	5
Helary Mägisalu (EST)	0

Quarterfinals
Kerem Kamal (TUR)	5
Viktor Petryk (UKR)	1
Hleb Makaranka (BLR)	3
Murad Bazarov (AZE)	1
József Andrási (HUN)	0
Sergey Emelin (RUS)	8
Gevorg Gharibyan (ARM)	0
Răzvan Arnăut (ROU)	3

Semifinals
Kerem Kamal (TUR)	7
Hleb Makaranka (BLR)	2
Sergey Emelin (RUS)	9
Răzvan Arnăut (ROU)	0

Final
Kerem Kamal (TUR)	1
Sergey Emelin (RUS)	4

Repechage round 1
Grzegorz Kunkel (POL)	4^{F}
József Andrási (HUN)	0

Bronze medal match
Viktor Petryk (UKR)	5
Hleb Makaranka (BLR)	1
Grzegorz Kunkel (POL)	0
Răzvan Arnăut (ROU)	6

== Final standing ==
Rank	Athlete
1st place, gold medalist(s)	Sergey Emelin (RUS)
2nd place, silver medalist(s)	Kerem Kamal (TUR)
3rd place, bronze medalist(s)	Viktor Petryk (UKR)
3rd place, bronze medalist(s)	Răzvan Arnăut (ROU)
5	Hleb Makaranka (BLR)
5	Grzegorz Kunkel (POL)
7	Gevorg Gharibyan (ARM)
8	Irakli Dzimistarishvili (GEO)
9	Murad Bazarov (AZE)
10	Helary Mägisalu (EST)
11	József Andrási (HUN)
