= 2020 European Wrestling Championships – Men's Greco-Roman 60 kg =

Wrestling competition

The men's Greco-Roman 60 kg is a competition featured at the 2020 European Wrestling Championships, and was held in Rome, Italy on February 11 and February 12.

== Medalists ==
Gold	Gevorg Gharibyan; Armenia
Silver	Kerem Kamal; Turkey
Bronze	Murad Bazarov; Azerbaijan
Bronze	Amiran Shavadze; Georgia

== Results ==
Legend

- F — Won by fall

1/8 finals
Helary Mägisalu (EST)	3
Teodor Horătău (ROU)	2
Murad Bazarov (AZE)	2
Jacopo Sandron (ITA)	1
Avgustin Spasov (BUL)	1
Gevorg Gharibyan (ARM)	9
Zhora Abovian (UKR)	2
Kerem Kamal (TUR)	6
Yahor Beliak (BLR)	0
Zhambolat Lokyaev (RUS)	9
Krisztián Kecskeméti (HUN)	3
Juuso Latvala (FIN)	5
Amiran Shavadze (GEO)	8
Dimitar Sandov (SUI)	0

Quarterfinals
Przemysław Piątek (POL)	4
Helary Mägisalu (EST)	5
Murad Bazarov (AZE)	0
Gevorg Gharibyan (ARM)	8
Kerem Kamal (TUR)	6
Zhambolat Lokyaev (RUS)	1
Juuso Latvala (FIN)	0
Amiran Shavadze (GEO)	8

Semifinals
Helary Mägisalu (EST)	0
Gevorg Gharibyan (ARM)	8
Kerem Kamal (TUR)	9
Amiran Shavadze (GEO)	0

Final
Gevorg Gharibyan (ARM)	5
Kerem Kamal (TUR)	5

Repechage round 1
Avgustin Spasov (BUL)	1
Murad Bazarov (AZE)	9
Zhora Abovian (UKR)	2
Zhambolat Lokyaev (RUS)	3

Bronze medal match
Murad Bazarov (AZE)	9
Helary Mägisalu (EST)	0
Zhambolat Lokyaev (RUS)	6
Amiran Shavadze (GEO)	6

== Final standing ==
Rank	Athlete
1st place, gold medalist(s)	Gevorg Gharibyan (ARM)
2nd place, silver medalist(s)	Kerem Kamal (TUR)
3rd place, bronze medalist(s)	Murad Bazarov (AZE)
3rd place, bronze medalist(s)	Amiran Shavadze (GEO)
5	Zhambolat Lokyaev (RUS)
5	Helary Mägisalu (EST)
7	Juuso Latvala (FIN)
8	Zhora Abovian (UKR)
9	Avgustin Spasov (BUL)
10	Przemysław Piątek (POL)
11	Krisztián Kecskeméti (HUN)
12	Teodor Horătău (ROU)
13	Jacopo Sandron (ITA)
14	Dimitar Sandov (SUI)
15	Yahor Beliak (BLR)
