= 2022 European Wrestling Championships – Men's Greco-Roman 60 kg =

Wrestling competition

Men's Greco-Roman 60 kg at the 2022 European Wrestling Championships
- Venue: BOK Sports Hall
- Location: Budapest, Hungary
- Dates: 2-3 April
- Competitors: 16

Medalists
| gold medal | Kerem Kamal | Turkey |
| silver medal | Edmond Nazaryan | Bulgaria |
| bronze medal | Murad Mammadov | Azerbaijan |
| bronze medal | Gevorg Gharibyan | Armenia |

The Men's Greco-Roman 60 kg is a competition featured at the 2022 European Wrestling Championships, and was held in Budapest, Hungary on April 2 and 3.

== Results ==
Legend

- F — Won by fall

=== Main Bracket ===
1/8 finals
Murad Mammadov (AZE) | 8
Daniel Bobillo (ESP) | 0
Michał Tracz (POL) | 1
Vitalie Eriomenco (MDA) | 3
Helary Mägisalu (EST) | 7^{F}
Abere Fetene (ISR) | 2
Kerem Kamal (TUR) | 9
Răzvan Arnăut (ROU) | 0
Zhora Abovian (UKR) | 11
Dimitar Sandov (SUI) | 0
Edmond Nazaryan (BUL) | 8
Erik Torba (HUN) | 1
Justas Petravičius (LTU) | 5
Pridon Abuladze (GEO) | 6
Abdolmohammad Papi (GER) | 0
Gevorg Gharibyan (ARM) | 7

Quarterfinals
Murad Mammadov (AZE) | 6
Vitalie Eriomenco (MDA) | 1
Helary Mägisalu (EST) | 1
Kerem Kamal (TUR) | 12
Zhora Abovian (UKR) | 1
Edmond Nazaryan (BUL) | 3
Pridon Abuladze (GEO) | 2
Gevorg Gharibyan (ARM) | 3

Semifinals
Murad Mammadov (AZE) | 0
Kerem Kamal (TUR) | 8^{F}
Edmond Nazaryan (BUL) | 10
Gevorg Gharibyan (ARM) | 1

Final
Kerem Kamal (TUR) | 5
Edmond Nazaryan (BUL) | 0

=== Repechage ===
Repechage round 1
Răzvan Arnăut (ROU) | 7
Helary Mägisalu (EST) | 2
Erik Torba (HUN) | 3
Zhora Abovian (UKR) | 0

Bronze medal match
Răzvan Arnăut (ROU) | 2
Murad Mammadov (AZE) | 5
Erik Torba (HUN) | 1
Gevorg Gharibyan (ARM) | 5

== Final standing ==
| Rank | Athlete | UWW Points |
|---|---|---|
| 1st place, gold medalist(s) | Kerem Kamal (TUR) | 13000 |
| 2nd place, silver medalist(s) | Edmond Nazaryan (BUL) | 11000 |
| 3rd place, bronze medalist(s) | Murad Mammadov (AZE) | 9500 |
| 3rd place, bronze medalist(s) | Gevorg Gharibyan (ARM) | 9500 |
| 5 | Răzvan Arnăut (ROU) | 8000 |
| 5 | Erik Torba (HUN) | 8000 |
| 7 | Helary Mägisalu (EST) | 7400 |
| 8 | Zhora Abovian (UKR) | 7000 |
| 9 | Pridon Abuladze (GEO) | 6500 |
| 10 | Vitalie Eriomenco (MDA) | 6100 |
| 11 | Justas Petravičius (LTU) | 4000 |
| 12 | Michał Tracz (POL) | 3800 |
| 13 | Abere Fetene (ISR) | 3600 |
| 14 | Abdolmohammad Papi (GER) | 3400 |
| 15 | Daniel Bobillo (ESP) | 3200 |
| 16 | Dimitar Sandov (SUI) | 3100 |
