= 2026 World Wrestling Championships – Men's Greco-Roman 63 kg =

Wrestling competitions

Men's Greco-Roman 63 kg at the 2026 World Championships
- Venue: Barys Arena
- Dates: 26–27 October 2026
- Competitors: 26 from 26 nations

Medalists
gold medal	Karen Aslanyan	Armenia
silver medal	Nihat Mammadli	Azerbaijan
bronze medal	Sergey Emelin	Russia
bronze medal	Ozodbek Khalimboev	Uzbekistan

The men's Greco-Roman 63 kilograms is a competition featured at the 2026 World Wrestling Championships, and was held in Astana, Kazakhstan on 26 and 27 October 2026.

This Greco-Roman wrestling competition consists of a single-elimination tournament, with a repechage used to determine the winner of two bronze medals. The two finalists face off for gold and silver medals. Each wrestler who loses to one of the two finalists moves into the repechage, culminating in a pair of bronze medal matches, featuring the semifinal losers each facing the remaining repechage opponent from their half of the bracket.

== Results ==
Legend

- WO — Won by walkover

=== Final ===
Final
Nihat Mammadli (AZE)	4
Karen Aslanyan (ARM)	8

=== Top half ===
Round of 32
Aleksandrs Jurkjans (LAT)	1
Kim Chan (PRK)	3
Kaisei Tanabe (JPN)	9
Mairbek Salimov (POL)	0
Hu Yunlong (CHN)	4
Choi Hyun-woong (KOR)	7
Xavier Johnson (USA)
Nihat Mammadli (AZE)	WO
Meirambek Ainagulov (KAZ)	7
Maksym Liu (UKR)	9

Round of 16
Sergey Emelin (RUS)	6
Kim Chan (PRK)	3
Kaisei Tanabe (JPN)	9
Choi Hyun-woong (KOR)	0
Morten Thoresen (NOR)	0
Nihat Mammadli (AZE)	11
Maksym Liu (UKR)	1
Aref Mohammadi (QAT)	1

Quarterfinals
Sergey Emelin (RUS)	10
Kaisei Tanabe (JPN)	1
Nihat Mammadli (AZE)	10
Aref Mohammadi (QAT)	1

Semifinals
Sergey Emelin (RUS)	2
Nihat Mammadli (AZE)	2

=== Bottom half ===
Round of 32
Corneliu Rusu (MDA)	0
Karen Aslanyan (ARM)	10
Ozodbek Khalimboev (UZB)	10
Raiber Rodríguez (VEN)	0
Kerem Kamal (TUR)	8
Abdeldjebar Djebbari (ALG)	0
Edmond Nazaryan (BUL)	7
Sahil Kadyan (IND)	0
Tino Ojala (FIN)	6
Kevin de Armas (CUB)	1

Round of 16
Aftandil Taalaibek Uulu (KGZ)	0
Karen Aslanyan (ARM)	8
Ozodbek Khalimboev (UZB)	5
Pridon Abuladze (GEO)	3
Kerem Kamal (TUR)	6
Edmond Nazaryan (BUL)	11
Tino Ojala (FIN)	0
Mohammad Mehdi Keshtkar (IRI)	9

Quarterfinals
Karen Aslanyan (ARM)	9
Ozodbek Khalimboev (UZB)	0
Edmond Nazaryan (BUL)	8
Mohammad Mehdi Keshtkar (IRI)	1

Semifinals
Karen Aslanyan (ARM)	12
Edmond Nazaryan (BUL)	4

=== Repechage ===
Repechage round 1
Xavier Johnson (USA)
Morten Thoresen (NOR)	WO
Corneliu Rusu (MDA)	6
Aftandil Taalaibek Uulu (KGZ)	5

Repechage round 2
Morten Thoresen (NOR)	1
Aref Mohammadi (QAT)	1
Corneliu Rusu (MDA)	1
Ozodbek Khalimboev (UZB)	3

Bronze medals
Aref Mohammadi (QAT)	0
Sergey Emelin (RUS)	9
Ozodbek Khalimboev (UZB)	7
Edmond Nazaryan (BUL)	3

== Final standing ==
Rank	Athlete
1st place, gold medalist(s)	Karen Aslanyan (ARM)
2nd place, silver medalist(s)	Nihat Mammadli (AZE)
3rd place, bronze medalist(s)	Sergey Emelin (RUS)
3rd place, bronze medalist(s)	Ozodbek Khalimboev (UZB)
5	Aref Mohammadi (QAT)
5	Edmond Nazaryan (BUL)
7	Kaisei Tanabe (JPN)
8	Morten Thoresen (NOR)
9	Kerem Kamal (TUR)
10	Mohammad Mehdi Keshtkar (IRI)
11	Maksym Liu (UKR)
12	Corneliu Rusu (MDA)
13	Kim Chan (PRK)
14	Choi Hyun-woong (KOR)
15	Tino Ojala (FIN)
16	Meirambek Ainagulov (KAZ)
17	Aftandil Taalaibek Uulu (KGZ)
18	Hu Yunlong (CHN)
19	Pridon Abuladze (GEO)
20	Aleksandrs Jurkjans (LAT)
21	Kevin de Armas (CUB)
22	Xavier Johnson (USA)
23	Sahil Kadyan (IND)
24	Abdeldjebar Djebbari (ALG)
25	Mairbek Salimov (POL)
26	Raiber Rodríguez (VEN)
