= 2024 European Wrestling Championships – Men's Greco-Roman 60 kg =

Wrestling competition

Men's Greco-Roman 60 kg at the 2024 European Wrestling Championships
- Venue: Polyvalent Hall
- Location: Bucharest, Romania
- Dates: 13-14 February
- Competitors: 18

Medalists
gold medal	Nihat Mammadli	Azerbaijan
silver medal	Victor Ciobanu	Moldova
bronze medal	Sadyk Lalaev	Individual Neutral Athletes
bronze medal	Răzvan Arnăut	Romania

The Men's Greco-Roman 60 kg is a competition featured at the 2024 European Wrestling Championships, and was held in Bucharest, Romania on February 13 and 14.

== Results ==
Legend

- F — Won by fall

=== Final ===
Final
Victor Ciobanu (MDA)	3
Nihat Mammadli (AZE)	8

=== Top half ===
Round of 32
Georgii Tibilov (SRB)	10^{F}
Kerem Kamal (TUR)	3

Round of 16
Victor Ciobanu (MDA)	12
Viktor Petryk (UKR)	3
Georgii Tibilov (SRB)	12
Olivier Skrzypczak (POL)	2
Jamal Valizadeh (UWW)	1
Hleb Makaranka (AIN)	3
Sadyk Lalaev (AIN)	4
Pridon Abuladze (GEO)	1

Quarterfinals
Victor Ciobanu (MDA)	8
Georgii Tibilov (SRB)	0
Hleb Makaranka (AIN)	0
Sadyk Lalaev (AIN)	2

Semifinals
Victor Ciobanu (MDA)	5
Sadyk Lalaev (AIN)	3

=== Bottom half ===
Round of 32
Nihat Mammadli (AZE)	7
Nedyalko Petrov (BUL)	0

Round of 16
Gevorg Gharibyan (ARM)	9
Ilias Zairakis (GRE)	0
Melkamu Fetene (ISR)	2
Răzvan Arnăut (ROU)	6
Nikolai Mohammadi (DEN)	2
Nihat Mammadli (AZE)	3
Justas Petravičius (LTU)	8
Léo Tudezca (FRA)	0

Quarterfinals
Gevorg Gharibyan (ARM)	1
Răzvan Arnăut (ROU)	2
Nihat Mammadli (AZE)	8
Justas Petravičius (LTU)	0

Semifinals
Răzvan Arnăut (ROU)	0
Nihat Mammadli (AZE)	8

=== Repechage ===
Repechage round 1
Nedyalko Petrov (BUL)	2
Nikolai Mohammadi (DEN)	3

Repechage round 2
Viktor Petryk (UKR)	1
Georgii Tibilov (SRB)	8
Nikolai Mohammadi (DEN)	0
Justas Petravičius (LTU)	8

Bronze medal match
Georgii Tibilov (SRB)	1
Sadyk Lalaev (AIN)	2
Justas Petravičius (LTU)	0
Răzvan Arnăut (ROU)	10

== Final standing ==
Rank	Athlete
1st place, gold medalist(s)	Nihat Mammadli (AZE)
2nd place, silver medalist(s)	Victor Ciobanu (MDA)
3rd place, bronze medalist(s)	Sadyk Lalaev (AIN)
3rd place, bronze medalist(s)	Răzvan Arnăut (ROU)
5	Georgii Tibilov (SRB)
5	Justas Petravičius (LTU)
7	Gevorg Gharibyan (ARM)
8	Nikolai Mohammadi (DEN)
9	Hleb Makaranka (AIN)
10	Viktor Petryk (UKR)
11	Melkamu Fetene (ISR)
12	Nedyalko Petrov (BUL)
13	Olivier Skrzypczak (POL)
14	Jamal Valizadeh (UWW)
15	Pridon Abuladze (GEO)
16	Kerem Kamal (TUR)
17	Léo Tudezca (FRA)
18	Ilias Zairakis (GRE)
