= 2026 European Wrestling Championships – Men's Greco-Roman 60 kg =

Wrestling competition held in Tirana, Albania

Men's Greco-Roman 60 kg at the 2026 European Wrestling Championships
- Venue: Tirana Olympic Park
- Location: Tirana, Albania
- Dates: 21–22 April
- Competitors: 14 from 12 nations

Medalists
gold medal	Georgii Tibilov	Serbia
silver medal	Suren Aghajanyan	Armenia
bronze medal	Corneliu Rusu	Moldova
bronze medal	Nihat Mammadli	Azerbaijan

The men's Greco-Roman 60 kilograms competition at the 2026 European Wrestling Championships was held from 21 to 22 April 2026 at the Tirana Olympic Park in Tirana, Albania.

== Results ==
Legend

- F — Won by fall

=== Main bracket ===
Round of 16
Denis Mihai (ROU)	5
Ilian Ainaoui (FRA)	0
Mert İlbars (TUR)	8
Dimitri Khachidze (GEO)	5
Bajram Sina (ALB)	1
Corneliu Rusu (MDA)	10
Suner Konunov (UWW)	13
Borislav Kirilov (BUL)	5
Tommaso Bosi (ITA)	0
Suren Aghajanyan (ARM)	4^{F}
Jamal Valizadeh (UWW)	1
Vladyslav Kuzko (UKR)	3

Quarterfinals
Georgii Tibilov (SRB)	9
Denis Mihai (ROU)	0
Mert İlbars (TUR)	1
Corneliu Rusu (MDA)	1
Suner Konunov (UWW)	0
Suren Aghajanyan (ARM)	8
Vladyslav Kuzko (UKR)	0
Nihat Mammadli (AZE)	5

Semifinals
Georgii Tibilov (SRB)	7
Corneliu Rusu (MDA)	1
Suren Aghajanyan (ARM)	8^{F}
Nihat Mammadli (AZE)	1

Final
Georgii Tibilov (SRB)	2
Suren Aghajanyan (ARM)	2

=== Repechage ===
Repechage round 1
Tommaso Bosi (ITA)	0
Suner Konunov (UWW)	8

Bronze medal matches
Denis Mihai (ROU)	5
Corneliu Rusu (MDA)	6
Suner Konunov (UWW)	0
Nihat Mammadli (AZE)	6

== Final standing ==
Rank	Wrestler
1st place, gold medalist(s)	Georgii Tibilov (SRB)
2nd place, silver medalist(s)	Suren Aghajanyan (ARM)
3rd place, bronze medalist(s)	Corneliu Rusu (MDA)
3rd place, bronze medalist(s)	Nihat Mammadli (AZE)
5	Denis Mihai (ROU)
5	Suner Konunov (UWW)
7	Mert İlbars (TUR)
8	Vladyslav Kuzko (UKR)
9	Dimitri Khachidze (GEO)
10	Borislav Kirilov (BUL)
11	Jamal Valizadeh (UWW)
12	Bajram Sina (ALB)
13	Ilian Ainaoui (FRA)
14	Tommaso Bosi (ITA)
