= 2024 European Wrestling Championships – Men's Greco-Roman 63 kg =

Wrestling competition

Men's Greco-Roman 63 kg at the 2024 European Wrestling Championships
- Venue: Polyvalent Hall
- Location: Bucharest, Romania
- Dates: 12-13 February
- Competitors: 18

Medalists
gold medal	Murad Mammadov	Azerbaijan
silver medal	Oleksandr Hrushyn	Ukraine
bronze medal	Edmond Nazaryan	Bulgaria
bronze medal	Anvar Allakhiarov	Individual Neutral Athletes

The Men's Greco-Roman 63 kg is a competition featured at the 2024 European Wrestling Championships, and was held in Bucharest, Romania on February 12 and 13.

== Results ==
Legend

- F — Won by fall

=== Final ===
Final
Oleksandr Hrushyn (UKR)	1
Murad Mammadov (AZE)	2

=== Top half ===
Round of 32
Ivan Lizatović (CRO)	0
Edmond Nazaryan (BUL)	9

Round of 16
Leri Abuladze (GEO)	3
Donior Islamov (MDA)	2
Edmond Nazaryan (BUL)	10
Yaraslau Kardash (AIN)	0
Alexander Bica (SWE)	5
Hrachya Poghosyan (ARM)	5
Oleksandr Hrushyn (UKR)	3
Stefan Clément (FRA)	1

Quarterfinals
Leri Abuladze (GEO)	0
Edmond Nazaryan (BUL)	3
Alexander Bica (SWE)	3
Oleksandr Hrushyn (UKR)	4

Semifinals
Edmond Nazaryan (BUL)	5
Oleksandr Hrushyn (UKR)	9

=== Bottom half ===
Round of 32
Pavel Alexe (ROU)	2
Aleksandrs Jurkjans (LAT)	10

Round of 16
Enes Başar (TUR)	5
Aker Al-Obaidi (AUT)	1
Anvar Allakhiarov (AIN)	9
Jacopo Sandron (ITA)	0
Mairbek Salimov (POL)	5
Aleksandrs Jurkjans (LAT)	7
Brian Kurt Santiago (DEN)	0
Murad Mammadov (AZE)	8

Quarterfinals
Enes Başar (TUR)	9
Anvar Allakhiarov (AIN)	10
Aleksandrs Jurkjans (LAT)	1
Murad Mammadov (AZE)	3

Semifinals
Anvar Allakhiarov (AIN)	3
Murad Mammadov (AZE)	3

=== Repechage ===
Repechage round 2
Stefan Clément (FRA)	6
Alexander Bica (SWE)	3
Brian Kurt Santiago (DEN)	0
Aleksandrs Jurkjans (LAT)	5^{F}

Bronze medal match
Stefan Clément (FRA)	1
Edmond Nazaryan (BUL)	1
Aleksandrs Jurkjans (LAT)	0
Anvar Allakhiarov (AIN)	9

== Final standing ==
Rank	Athlete
1st place, gold medalist(s)	Murad Mammadov (AZE)
2nd place, silver medalist(s)	Oleksandr Hrushyn (UKR)
3rd place, bronze medalist(s)	Edmond Nazaryan (BUL)
3rd place, bronze medalist(s)	Anvar Allakhiarov (AIN)
5	Stefan Clément (FRA)
5	Aleksandrs Jurkjans (LAT)
7	Alexander Bica (SWE)
8	Enes Başar (TUR)
9	Leri Abuladze (GEO)
10	Hrachya Poghosyan (ARM)
11	Mairbek Salimov (POL)
12	Donior Islamov (MDA)
13	Pavel Alexe (ROU)
14	Aker Al-Obaidi (AUT)
15	Ivan Lizatović (CRO)
16	Jacopo Sandron (ITA)
17	Yaraslau Kardash (AIN)
18	Brian Kurt Santiago (DEN)
