= Turkmenistan at the 2018 Summer Youth Olympics =

- IOC code: TKM
- NOC: National Olympic Committee of Turkmenistan

in Buenos Aires, Argentina 6 – 18 October 2018
- Competitors: 10 in 5 sports
- Flag bearer: Annaguly Hojagulyyev
- Medals: Gold 0 Silver 0 Bronze 0 Total 0

Summer Youth Olympics appearances (overview)
- 2010; 2014; 2018; 2026

Turkmenistan participated at the 2018 Summer Youth Olympics in Buenos Aires, Argentina from 6 October to 18 October 2018.

== Competitors ==
Sport	Boys	Girls	Total
Athletics	1	1	2
Basketball	4	0	4
Judo	0	1	1
Weightlifting	1	1	2
Wrestling	1	0	1
Total	7	3	10

== Athletics ==
Boys

Athlete	Event	Stage 1		Stage 2		Total	
Athlete	Event	Result	Rank	Result	Rank	Total	Rank
Shirgeldi Utomyshov	Boys' high jump	1.95	15	did not advance		1.95	15

Girls

Athlete	Event	Stage 1		Stage 2		Total	
Athlete	Event	Result	Rank	Result	Rank	Total	Rank
Gozel Chopanova	Girls' 3000 metres	10:55.75	19	did not advance		did not finish	

== Basketball ==
Turkmenistan qualified a boys' team based on the U18 3x3 National Federation Ranking.

Boys' tournament

Event	Group stage					Quarterfinal	Semifinal	Final / BM	
Event	Opposition Score	Opposition Score	Opposition Score	Opposition Score	Rank	Opposition Score	Opposition Score	Opposition Score	Rank
Boys' tournament	Slovenia; L 6–20	Georgia; L 9–20	China; L 14–16	Jordan; W 19–5	4	did not advance			16

== Judo ==
Individual

Athlete	Event	Round of 16	Quarterfinals	Semifinals	Rep 1	Rep 2	Rep 3	Final / BM	
Athlete	Event	Opposition Result	Opposition Result	Opposition Result	Opposition Result	Opposition Result	Opposition Result	Opposition Result	Rank
Milana Charygulyyeva	Girls' 52 kg	Andriamifehy (MAD); L 00s1–01s1	did not advance		Acosta (CUB); L00s1–10	did not advance			

Team

Athletes	Event	Round of 16	Quarterfinals	Semifinals	Final	
Athletes	Event	Opposition Result	Opposition Result	Opposition Result	Opposition Result	Rank
Team Rio de Janeiro; Milana Charygulyyeva (TKM); Yassamine Djellab (ALG); Metka Lobnik (SLO); Erza Muminoviq (KOS); Abrek Naguchev (RUS); Fleury Nihozeko (BUR); Jamshed Sulaimoni (TJK); Sultan Zhenishbekov (KGZ)	Mixed team	Team Sydney (MIX); W 4–3	Team Atlanta (MIX); W 5–4	Team Athens (MIX); L 3–5	did not advance	3rd place, bronze medalist(s)

== Weightlifting ==
Turkmenistan qualified one athlete based on its performance at the 2018 Asian Youth Championships.

Boy

Athlete	Event	Snatch		Clean & Jerk		Total	Rank
Athlete	Event	Result	Rank	Result	Rank	Total	Rank
Reýimbergen Jumaýew	−62 kg	109	7	125	8	234	8

Girl

Athlete	Event	Snatch		Clean & jerk		Total	Rank
Athlete	Event	Result	Rank	Result	Rank	Total	Rank
Sangiza Bahtyýarowa	+63 kg	70	8	86	8	156	8

== Wrestling ==
Key:
- VFA – Victory by Fall
- VSU – Without any points scored by the opponent
- VSU1 – With point(s) scored by the opponent
- VPO – Without any points scored by the opponent
- VPO1 – With point(s) scored by the opponent

Athlete	Event	Group stage			Final / RM	Rank
Athlete	Event	Opposition Score	Opposition Score	Rank	Opposition Score	Rank
Arslanbek Zakirbaýew	Boys' Greco-Roman −45kg	de Jesús (HON); W 9 – 0 ^{VSU}	Peralta (ECU); L 4 – 7 ^{VPO1}	2 Q	Nazaryan (BUL); L 0 – 8 ^{VSU}	4
