= 3x3 Basketball at the 2018 Summer Youth Olympics – Boys' tournament =

Tournament details
- Host country: Argentina
- City: Buenos Aires
- Dates: 7–17 October
- Teams: 20

Final positions
- Champions: Argentina (1st title)
- Runners-up: Belgium
- Third place: Slovenia
- Fourth place: Ukraine

The boys' tournament in 3x3 basketball at the 2018 Summer Youth Olympics was held from 7 to 17 October 2018 at the Parque Mujeres Argentinas in Buenos Aires, Argentina.

Host team Argentina won the gold medal.

== Participating teams ==
Group A

- China
- Slovenia
- Jordan
- Turkmenistan
- Georgia

Group B

- Ukraine
- Andorra
- Venezuela
- Brazil
- New Zealand

Group C

- Argentina
- Russia
- Estonia
- United States
- Mongolia

Group D

- Italy
- Latvia
- Kazakhstan
- Kyrgyzstan
- Belgium

== Preliminary round ==
All times are local (UTC–3).

=== Pool A ===
Team	Pld	W	L	PF	PA	PPM
Slovenia	4	4	0	63	28	15.8
Georgia	4	3	1	56	23	14.0
China	4	2	2	65	61	16.3
Turkmenistan	4	1	3	48	61	12.0
Jordan	4	0	4	24	83	6.0

9 October	Slovenia	W/O–0	Georgia
09:00

9 October	Jordan	5–19	Turkmenistan
09:30
		Boxscore

9 October	China	18–21	Slovenia
11:00
		Boxscore

9 October	Georgia	21–4	Jordan
11:30
		Boxscore

9 October	China	16–14	Turkmenistan
13:00
		Boxscore

13 October	Jordan	11–21	China
10:50
		Boxscore

13 October	Turkmenistan	9–20	Georgia
11:15
		Boxscore

13 October	Slovenia	22–4	Jordan
12:30
		Boxscore

13 October	Georgia	15–10	China
12:55
		Boxscore

13 October	Turkmenistan	6–20	Slovenia
13:45
		Boxscore

=== Pool B ===
Team	Pld	W	L	PF	PA	PPM
Ukraine	4	4	0	85	49	21.3
Brazil	4	3	1	71	64	17.8
New Zealand	4	2	2	72	72	18.0
Venezuela	4	1	3	72	74	18.0
Andorra	4	0	4	39	80	9.8

8 October	Andorra	16–21	New Zealand
09:00
		Boxscore

8 October	Venezuela	9–21	Brazil
09:30
		Boxscore

8 October	Ukraine	22–5	Andorra
11:00
		Boxscore

8 October	New Zealand	21–15	Venezuela
11:30
		Boxscore

8 October	Ukraine	20–15	Brazil
13:00
		Boxscore

12 October	Venezuela	16–22	Ukraine
11:00
		Boxscore

12 October	Brazil	20–17	New Zealand
11:30
		Boxscore

12 October	Andorra	10–22	Venezuela
13:00
		Boxscore

12 October	New Zealand	13–21	Ukraine
13:30
		Boxscore

12 October	Brazil	15–8	Andorra
14:30
		Boxscore

=== Pool C ===
Team	Pld	W	L	PF	PA	PPM
Argentina	4	3	1	83	69	20.8
Russia	4	3	1	73	70	18.3
Estonia	4	2	2	83	71	20.8
United States	4	2	2	72	76	18.0
Mongolia	4	0	4	59	84	14.8

7 October	Mongolia	13–22	Estonia
09:00
		Boxscore

7 October	Russia	18–16	United States
09:30
		Boxscore

7 October	Argentina	22–19	Estonia
11:00
		Boxscore

7 October	United States	21–19	Mongolia
11:30
		Boxscore

7 October	Russia	14–21	Argentina
13:00
		Boxscore

11 October	Mongolia	12–19	Russia
11:00
		Boxscore

11 October	Estonia	21–14	United States
11:30
		Boxscore

11 October	Argentina	22–15	Mongolia
13:00
		Boxscore

11 October	Estonia	21–22 (OT)	Russia
13:30
		Boxscore

11 October	United States	21–18	Argentina
14:30
		Boxscore

=== Pool D ===
Team	Pld	W	L	PF	PA	PPM
Belgium	4	4	0	77	52	19.3
Italy	4	3	1	77	46	19.3
Latvia	4	2	2	60	65	15.0
Kazakhstan	4	1	3	58	73	14.5
Kyrgyzstan	4	0	4	42	78	10.5

10 October	Latvia	16–18	Belgium
09:00
		Boxscore

10 October	Kazakhstan	21–13	Kyrgyzstan
09:30
		Boxscore

10 October	Italy	19–10	Latvia
11:00
		Boxscore

10 October	Belgium	20–9	Kazakhstan
11:30
		Boxscore

10 October	Italy	21–6	Kyrgyzstan
13:00
		Boxscore

14 October	Kazakhstan	12–21	Italy
10:50
		Boxscore

14 October	Kyrgyzstan	11–21	Belgium
11:15
		Boxscore

14 October	Latvia	19–16	Kazakhstan
12:30
		Boxscore

14 October	Belgium	18–16	Italy
12:55
		Boxscore

14 October	Kyrgyzstan	12–15	Latvia
13:45
		Boxscore

== Knockout round ==
=== Bracket ===
Quarterfinals
16 October
Slovenia	15
Russia	14
16 October
Belgium	21
Brazil	10
16 October
Ukraine	14
Italy	11
16 October
Argentina	21
Georgia	12

Semifinals
17 October
Slovenia	12
Belgium	14
17 October
Ukraine	16
Argentina (OT)	18

Final
17 October
Belgium	15
Argentina	20
Third place
17 October
Slovenia	21
Ukraine	13

=== Quarterfinals ===
16 October	Slovenia	15–14	Russia
12:50
		Boxscore

16 October	Ukraine	14–11	Italy
13:15
		Boxscore

16 October	Belgium	21–10	Brazil
15:50
		Boxscore

16 October	Argentina	21–12	Georgia
16:15
		Boxscore

=== Semifinals ===
17 October	Slovenia	12–14	Belgium
11:50
		Boxscore

17 October	Ukraine	16–18 (OT)	Argentina
12:15
		Boxscore

=== Third place game ===
17 October	Slovenia	21–13	Ukraine
13:05
		Boxscore

=== Final ===
17 October	Belgium	15–20	Argentina
13:55
		Boxscore

== Final standings ==
Rank	Team
1st place, gold medalist(s)	Argentina
2nd place, silver medalist(s)	Belgium
3rd place, bronze medalist(s)	Slovenia
4	Ukraine
5	Italy
6	Georgia
7	Russia
8	Brazil
9	Estonia
10	China
11	New Zealand
12	Latvia
13	United States
14	Venezuela
15	Turkmenistan
16	Kazakhstan
17	Mongolia
18	Kyrgyzstan
19	Andorra
20	Jordan
