= 2025 European Wrestling Championships – Men's Greco-Roman 60 kg =

Wrestling competition

Men's Greco-Roman 60 kg at the 2025 European Wrestling Championships
- Venue: X-Bionic Sphere
- Location: Bratislava, Slovakia
- Dates: 12-13 April
- Competitors: 13

Medalists
gold medal	Nihat Mammadli	Azerbaijan
silver medal	Georgii Tibilov	Serbia
bronze medal	Sadyk Lalaev
bronze medal	Amiran Shavadze	Georgia

The men's Greco-Roman 60 kg is a competition featured at the 2025 European Wrestling Championships, and was held in Bratislava, Slovakia on April 12 and 13.

== Results ==
Legend

- F — Won by fall

=== Main bracket ===
Round of 16
Karapet Manvelyan (ARM)	4
Olivier Skrzypczak (POL)	8
Viktor Petryk (UKR)	5
Ekrem Öztürk (TUR)	10
Melkamu Fetene (ISR)	3
Sadyk Lalaev (UWW)	4
Nedyalko Petrov (BUL)	8^{F}
Tommaso Bosi (ITA)	0
Nihat Mammadli (AZE)	9
Justas Petravičius (LTU)	0

Quarterfinals
Georgii Tibilov (SRB)	9
Olivier Skrzypczak (POL)	0
Ekrem Öztürk (TUR)	1
Sadyk Lalaev (UWW)	1
~~Victor Ciobanu (MDA)~~	5
Nedyalko Petrov (BUL)	0
Nihat Mammadli (AZE)	9
Amiran Shavadze (GEO)	0

Semifinals
Georgii Tibilov (SRB)	1
Sadyk Lalaev (UWW)	1
~~Victor Ciobanu (MDA)~~	0
Nihat Mammadli (AZE)	8

Final
Georgii Tibilov (SRB)	3
Nihat Mammadli (AZE)	7

=== Repechage ===
Repechage round 1
Justas Petravičius (LTU)	4
Amiran Shavadze (GEO)	7

Bronze medal match
Olivier Skrzypczak (POL)	0
Sadyk Lalaev (UWW)	5
Amiran Shavadze (GEO)	0
~~Victor Ciobanu (MDA)~~	10

== Final standing ==
Rank	Athlete
1st place, gold medalist(s)	Nihat Mammadli (AZE)
2nd place, silver medalist(s)	Georgii Tibilov (SRB)
3rd place, bronze medalist(s)	Sadyk Lalaev (UWW)
3rd place, bronze medalist(s)	Amiran Shavadze (GEO)
5	Olivier Skrzypczak (POL)
6	Nedyalko Petrov (BUL)
7	Ekrem Öztürk (TUR)
8	Viktor Petryk (UKR)
9	Karapet Manvelyan (ARM)
10	Justas Petravičius (LTU)
11	Melkamu Fetene (ISR)
12	Tommaso Bosi (ITA)
DQ	Victor Ciobanu (MDA)
