= 2022 U23 World Wrestling Championships – Men's Greco-Roman 60 kg =

Wrestling competitions

Men's Greco-Roman 60 kg at the 2022 U23 World Championships
- Venue: Pontevedra Municipal Sports Hall
- Dates: 18–19 October
- Competitors: 17 from 17 nations

Medalists
gold medal	Kerem Kamal	Turkey
silver medal	Nihat Mammadli	Azerbaijan
bronze medal	Olzhas Sultan	Kazakhstan
bronze medal	Melkamu Fetene	Israel

The men's Greco-Roman 60 kilograms is a competition featured at the 2022 U23 World Wrestling Championships, and was held in Pontevedra, Spain on 18 and 19 October 2022. The qualification rounds were held on 18 October while medal matches were held on the 2nd day of the competition. A total of 17 wrestlers competed in this event, limited to athletes whose body weight was less than 60 kilograms.

This Greco-Roman wrestling competition consists of a single-elimination tournament, with a repechage used to determine the winner of two bronze medals. The two finalists face off for gold and silver medals. Each wrestler who loses to one of the two finalists moves into the repechage, culminating in a pair of bronze medal matches featuring the semifinal losers each facing the remaining repechage opponent from their half of the bracket.

== Results ==
Legend

- F — Won by fall
- R — Retired
- WO — Won by walkover

=== Final ===
Final
Nihat Mammadli (AZE)	0
Kerem Kamal (TUR)	8

=== Top half ===
Round of 32
Olzhas Sultan (KAZ)	0
Nihat Mammadli (AZE)	5

Round of 16
Huang Jui-chi (TPE)	1
Vladyslav Kuzko (UKR)	6
Nihat Mammadli (AZE)	9
Sumit Dalal (IND)	0
Georgios Scarpello (GER)	5
Phillip Moomey (USA)	7
Nurmukhammet Abdullaev (KGZ)	3
Grzegorz Kunkel (POL)	1

Quarterfinals
Vladyslav Kuzko (UKR)	1
Nihat Mammadli (AZE)	4
Phillip Moomey (USA)	0
Nurmukhammet Abdullaev (KGZ)	8

Semifinals
Nihat Mammadli (AZE)	3
Nurmukhammet Abdullaev (KGZ)	1

=== Bottom half ===
Round of 32

Round of 16
Omid Arami (IRI)	1
Kerem Kamal (TUR)	5^{F}
Ronaldo Sánchez (COL)	0
Melkamu Fetene (ISR)	3
Kaito Inaba (JPN)	6^{F}
Aser Ebro (ESP)	0
Irakli Dzimistarishvili (GEO)	8
Tigran Minasyan (ARM)	3

Quarterfinals
Kerem Kamal (TUR)	5
Melkamu Fetene (ISR)	4
Kaito Inaba (JPN)	0
Irakli Dzimistarishvili (GEO)	9

Semifinals
Kerem Kamal (TUR)	4
Irakli Dzimistarishvili (GEO)	4

=== Repechage ===
Repechage round 1
Olzhas Sultan (KAZ)	8
Sumit Dalal (IND)	0

Repechage round 2
Olzhas Sultan (KAZ)	6
Vladyslav Kuzko (UKR)	5
~~Omid Arami (IRI)~~
Melkamu Fetene (ISR)	WO

Bronze medals
Olzhas Sultan (KAZ)	8
Nurmukhammet Abdullaev (KGZ)	0
Melkamu Fetene (ISR)	11
Irakli Dzimistarishvili (GEO)	7^{R}

== Final standing ==
Rank	Athlete
1st place, gold medalist(s)	Kerem Kamal (TUR)
2nd place, silver medalist(s)	Nihat Mammadli (AZE)
3rd place, bronze medalist(s)	Olzhas Sultan (KAZ)
3rd place, bronze medalist(s)	Melkamu Fetene (ISR)
5	Nurmukhammet Abdullaev (KGZ)
5	Irakli Dzimistarishvili (GEO)
7	Kaito Inaba (JPN)
8	Vladyslav Kuzko (UKR)
9	Phillip Moomey (USA)
10	Georgios Scarpello (GER)
11	Tigran Minasyan (ARM)
12	Grzegorz Kunkel (POL)
13	Huang Jui-chi (TPE)
14	Ronaldo Sánchez (COL)
15	Aser Ebro (ESP)
16	Sumit Dalal (IND)
—	Omid Arami (IRI)
