= Qazbölük =

Village in Balakan Rayon, Azerbaijan

- Village
- Location within Azerbaijan
- Coordinates: 41°41′N 46°14′E
- Country: Azerbaijan
- Rayon: Balakan
- Municipality: Meşəşambul

Qazbölük is a village in the municipality of Meşəşambul in the Balakan Rayon of Azerbaijan.
