= Amiran Shavadze =

Georgian Greco-Roman wrestler

Personal information
- Born: 22 September 1993 (age 32)
- Height: 165 cm (5 ft 5 in)

Sport
- Country: Georgia
- Sport: Amateur wrestling
- Event: Greco-Roman
- Club: National Club of Georgia
Medal record
Men's Greco-Roman wrestling
Representing Georgia
European Championships
Bronze medal – third place	2020 Rome	60 kg
Bronze medal – third place	2025 Bratislava	60 kg
Grand Prix
Gold medal – first place	2013 Goetzis	66 kg
Silver medal – second place	2025 Tirana	60 kg
Bronze medal – third place	2018 Tbilisi	60 kg
European Cadets Championships
Bronze medal – third place	2009 Zrenjanin	46 kg
Bronze medal – third place	2010 Sarajevo	54 kg

Amiran Shavadze (born 22 September 1993) is a Georgian Greco-Roman wrestler. In 2020, he won one of the bronze medals in the 60 kg event at the 2020 European Wrestling Championships held in Rome, Italy.

== Achievements ==
Year	Tournament	Location	Result	Event
2020	European Championships	Rome, Italy	3rd	Greco-Roman 60 kg
