= Athletics at the 2018 Summer Youth Olympics – Boys' high jump =

Boys' high jump at the III Summer Youth Olympic Games
- Venue: Parque Polideportivo Roca
- Date: 11 October and 14 October 2018
- Competitors: 16 from 16 nations

Medalists
1st place, gold medalist(s)		Chen Long	China
2nd place, silver medalist(s)		Oscar Mier	Australia
3rd place, bronze medalist(s)		Oleh Doroshchuk	Ukraine

The boys' high jump competition at the 2018 Summer Youth Olympics was held on 11 and 14 October, at the Parque Polideportivo Roca.

== Schedule ==
All times are in local time (UTC-3).

Date	Time	Round
Thursday, 11 October 2018	15:00	Stage 1
Sunday, 14 October 2018	16:05	Stage 2

== Results ==
=== Stage 1 ===
Rank	Athlete	Nation	1.85	1.90	1.95	2.00	2.05	2.09	2.13	Result	Notes
1	Chen Long	China	–	–	o	o	o	o	xxo	2.13	
2	Arttu Mattila	Finland	–	–	o	o	o	o	xxx	2.09	
3	Oleh Doroshchuk	Ukraine	–	o	o	o	o	xo	xxx	2.09	
4	Seniru Amarasinghe	Sri Lanka	–	–	–	o	o	xxx		2.05	
4	Elton Petronilho	Brazil	–	–	o	o	o	xxx		2.05	PB
6	Kampton Kam	Singapore	–	xo	o	xo	o	xxx		2.05	
7	Oscar Mier	Australia	–	–	o	o	xo	xxx		2.05	
8	Charles McBride	United States	–	o	o	o	xxo	xxx		2.05	
9	Shaun Miller	Bahamas	–	xo	o	o	xxo	xxx		2.05	
10	Bilel Afer	Algeria	o	o	o	o	xxx			2.00	
11	Ali Berk Erol	Turkey	–	–	–	xo	xxx			2.00	
12	Nikola Mujanović	Serbia	–	o	o	xxo	xxx			2.00	
13	Mohammed-Ali Benlahbib	France	–	–	o	xxx				1.95	
13	Armando Bustos	Venezuela	o	o	o	xxx				1.95	
15	Shirgeldi Utomyshov	Turkmenistan	xo	o	o	xxx				1.95	
16	Justine Herrera	Ecuador	o	o	xxx					1.90	

=== Stage 2 ===
Rank	Athlete	Nation	1.83	1.88	1.93	1.98	2.03	2.07	2.11	2.14	2.16	2.18	2.20	2.22	2.24	2.26	Result	Notes
1	Chen Long	China	–	–	–	o	o	o	o	o	o	xxo	x–	o	-	xxx	2.22	PB
2	Oscar Mier	Australia	–	–	–	o	o	o	o	xo	o	o	–	xo	–	xxx	2.22	PB
3	Oleh Doroshchuk	Ukraine	–	–	o	o	o	o	xo	xo	xxx						2.14	
4	Seniru Amarasinghe	Sri Lanka	–	–	–	o	xo	xo	xo	xxo	xxx						2.14	=PB
5	Elton Petronilho	Brazil	–	–	–	o	o	o	o	xxx							2.11	PB
6	Kampton Kam	Singapore	–	–	–	o	o	o	xxx								2.07	
6	Shaun Miller	Bahamas	–	–	o	o	o	o	xxx								2.07	
8	Nikola Mujanović	Serbia	–	–	o	o	o	xo	xxx								2.07	
9	Arttu Mattila	Finland	–	–	–	xxo	o	xo	xxx								2.07	
10	Mohammed-Ali Benlahbib	France	–	–	–	o	xxo	xxo	xxx								2.07	
11	Charles McBride	United States	–	–	o	o	o	xxx									2.03	
12	Bilel Afer	Algeria	–	o	o	o	xxx										1.98	
13	Armando Bustos	Venezuela	–	xx–	o	xx–	x										1.93	
14	Justine Herrera	Ecuador	o	o	xxo	xx–	x										1.93	
	Ali Berk Erol	Turkey															DNS	

=== Final placing ===
Rank	Athlete	Nation	Stage 1	Stage 2	Total
1st place, gold medalist(s)	Chen Long	China	2.13	2.22	4.35
2nd place, silver medalist(s)	Oscar Mier	Australia	2.05	2.22	4.27
3rd place, bronze medalist(s)	Oleh Doroshchuk	Ukraine	2.09	2.14	4.23
4	Seniru Amarasinghe	Sri Lanka	2.05	2.14	4.19
5	Elton Petronilho	Brazil	2.05	2.11	4.16
6	Arttu Mattila	Finland	2.09	2.07	4.16
7	Kampton Kam	Singapore	2.05	2.07	4.12
7	Shaun Miller	Bahamas	2.05	2.07	4.12
9	Charles McBride	United States	2.05	2.03	4.08
10	Nikola Mujanović	Serbia	2.00	2.07	4.07
11	Mohammed-Ali Benlahbib	France	1.95	2.07	4.02
12	Bilel Afer	Algeria	2.00	1.98	3.98
13	Armando Bustos	Venezuela	1.95	1.93	3.88
14	Justine Herrera	Ecuador	1.90	1.93	3.83
15	Shirgeldi Utomyshov	Turkmenistan	1.95	NM	1.95
16	Ali Berk Erol	Turkey	2.00	DNS	
