= Wrestling at the 2018 Summer Youth Olympics – Boys' Greco-Roman 45 kg =

Boys' Greco-Roman 45kg at the III Summer Youth Olympic Games
- Venue: Asia Pavilion
- Date: 12 October 2018
- Competitors: 6 from 6 nations

Medalists
1st place, gold medalist(s)		Amir Reza Dehbozorgi; Iran
2nd place, silver medalist(s)		Jeremy Peralta; Ecuador
3rd place, bronze medalist(s)		Edmond Nazaryan; Bulgaria

The boys' Greco-Roman 45 kg competition at the 2018 Summer Youth Olympics was held on 12 October, at the Asia Pavilion.

== Competition format ==
As there were less than six wrestlers in a weight category, the pool phase will be run as a single group competing in a round-robin format. Ranking within the groups is used to determine the pairings for the final phase.

== Schedule ==
All times are in local time (UTC-3).

Date	Time	Round
Friday, 12 October 2018	10:00; 10:25; 10:50; 17:00	Round 1 Round 2 Round 3 Finals

== Results ==
Legend

- F — Won by fall

Group Stages

Qualified for the Gold-medal match
Qualified for the Bronze-medal match
Qualified for the 5th/6th Place Match

Group A

Pos	Athlete	Pld	W	L	CP	TP	Qualification
1	Amir Reza Dehbozorgi (IRI)	2	2	0	7	13	Gold-medal match
2	Edmond Nazaryan (BUL)	2	1	1	5	15	Bronze-medal match
3	Abdalla Mohamed Shaaban (EGY)	2	0	2	1	5	Classification 5th/6th place match

Source: UWW

	Score		CP
Edmond Nazaryan (BUL)	1–3	Amir Reza Dehbozorgi (IRI)	1–3 VPO1
Abdalla Mohamed Shaaban (EGY)	5–14	Edmond Nazaryan (BUL)	1–4 VSU1
Amir Reza Dehbozorgi (IRI)	10–0	Abdalla Mohamed Shaaban (EGY)	4–0 VSU

Group B

Pos	Athlete	Pld	W	L	CP	TP	Qualification
1	Jeremy Peralta (ECU)	2	2	0	8	14	Gold-medal match
2	Arslanbek Zakirbaýew (TKM)	2	1	1	5	13	Bronze-medal match
3	Denzel de Jesús (HON)	2	0	2	0	0	Classification 5th/6th place match

Source: UWW

	Score		CP
Denzel de Jesús (HON)	0–9	Arslanbek Zakirbaýew (TKM)	0–4 VSU
Jeremy Peralta (ECU)	7–0 Fall	Denzel de Jesús (HON)	5–0 VFA
Arslanbek Zakirbaýew (TKM)	4–7	Jeremy Peralta (ECU)	1–3 VPO1

=== Finals ===
Gold-medal match
Amir Reza Dehbozorgi (IRI)	8
Jeremy Peralta (ECU)	0

Bronze-medal match
Edmond Nazaryan (BUL)	8
Arslanbek Zakirbaýew (TKM)	0

Classification 5th/6th place match
Abdalla Mohamed Shaaban (EGY)	12^{F}
Denzel de Jesús (HON)	1

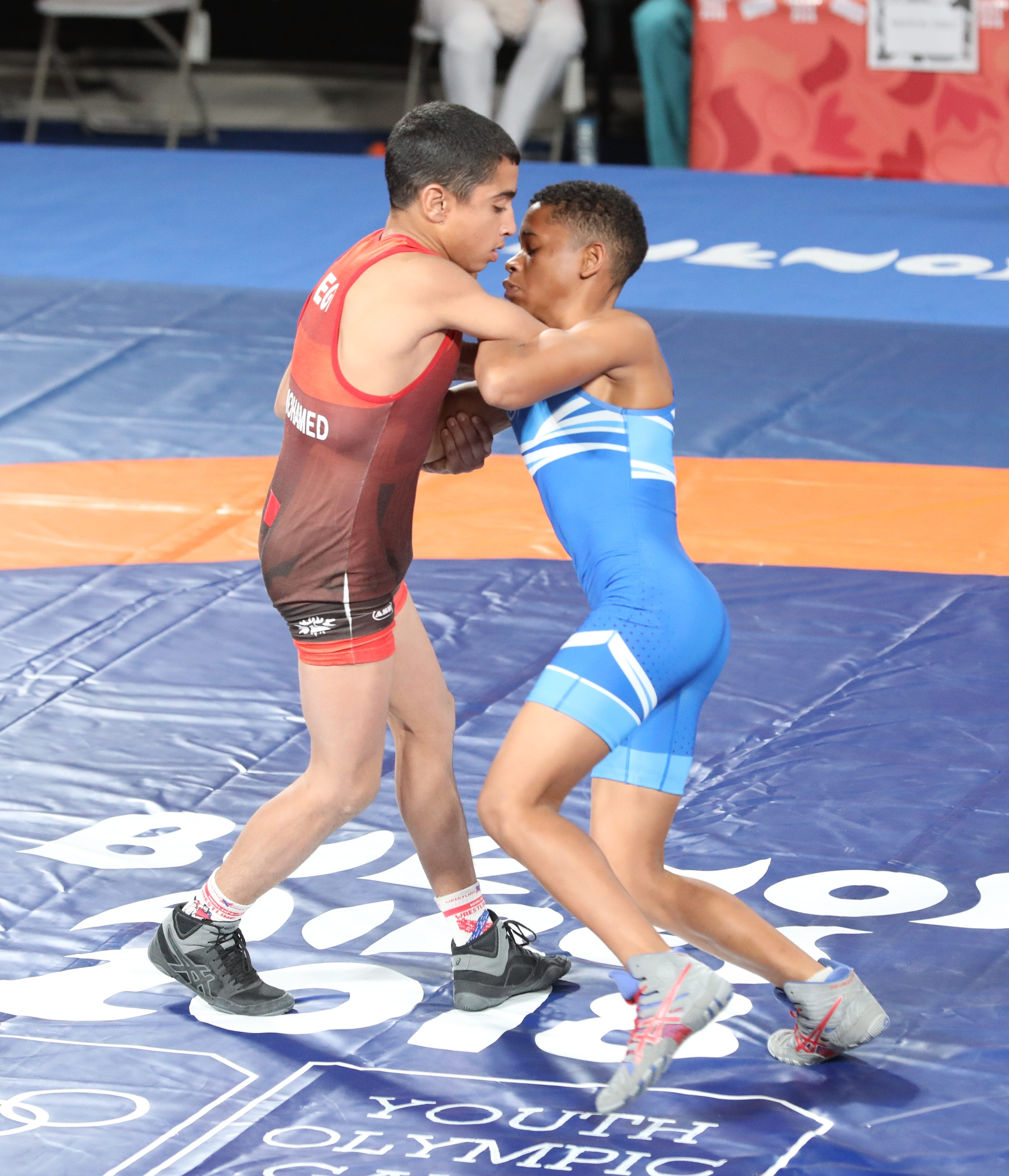
Classification 5th/6th Place Match: Abdalla Mohamed Shaaban (left) vs. Denzel de Jesús

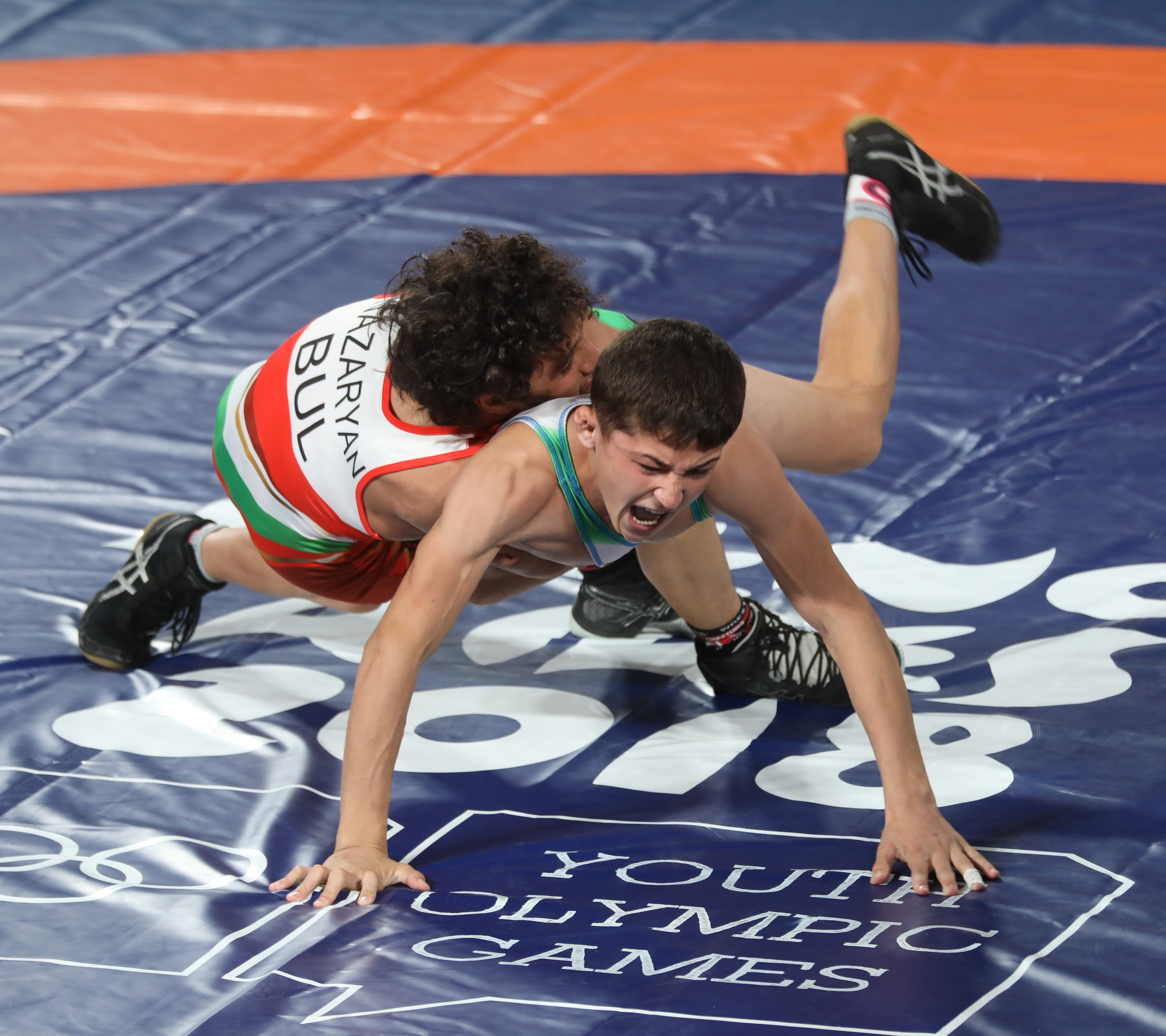
Bronze Medal Match: Edmond Nazaryan vs. Arslanbek Zakirbaýew (in front)

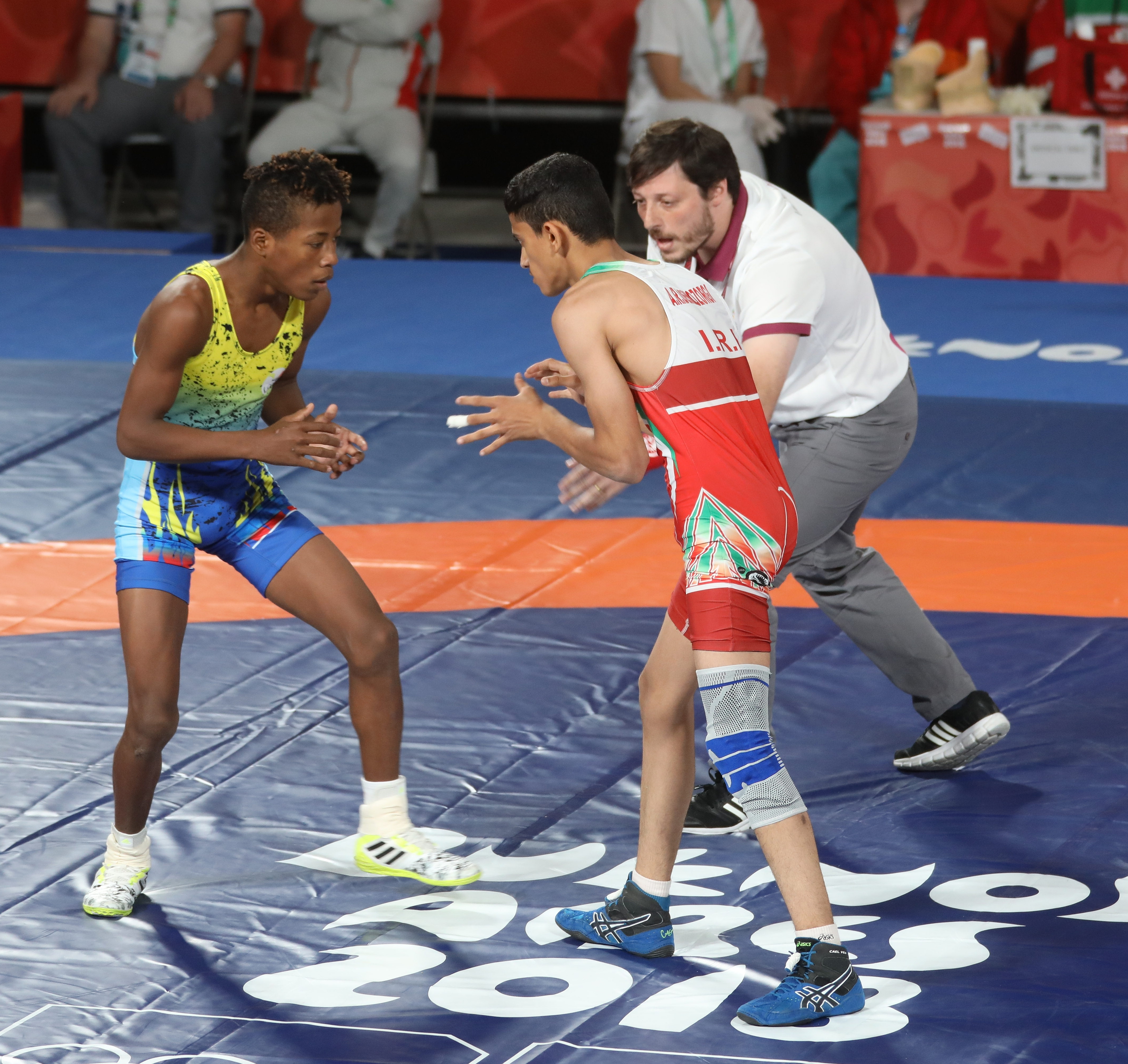
Gold Medal Match: Amir Reza Dehbozorgi (right) vs. Jeremy Peralta

== Final rankings ==
Rank	Athlete
1st place, gold medalist(s)	Amir Reza Dehbozorgi (IRI)
2nd place, silver medalist(s)	Jeremy Peralta (ECU)
3rd place, bronze medalist(s)	Edmond Nazaryan (BUL)
4	Arslanbek Zakirbaýew (TKM)
5	Abdalla Mohamed Shaaban (EGY)
6	Denzel de Jesús (HON)

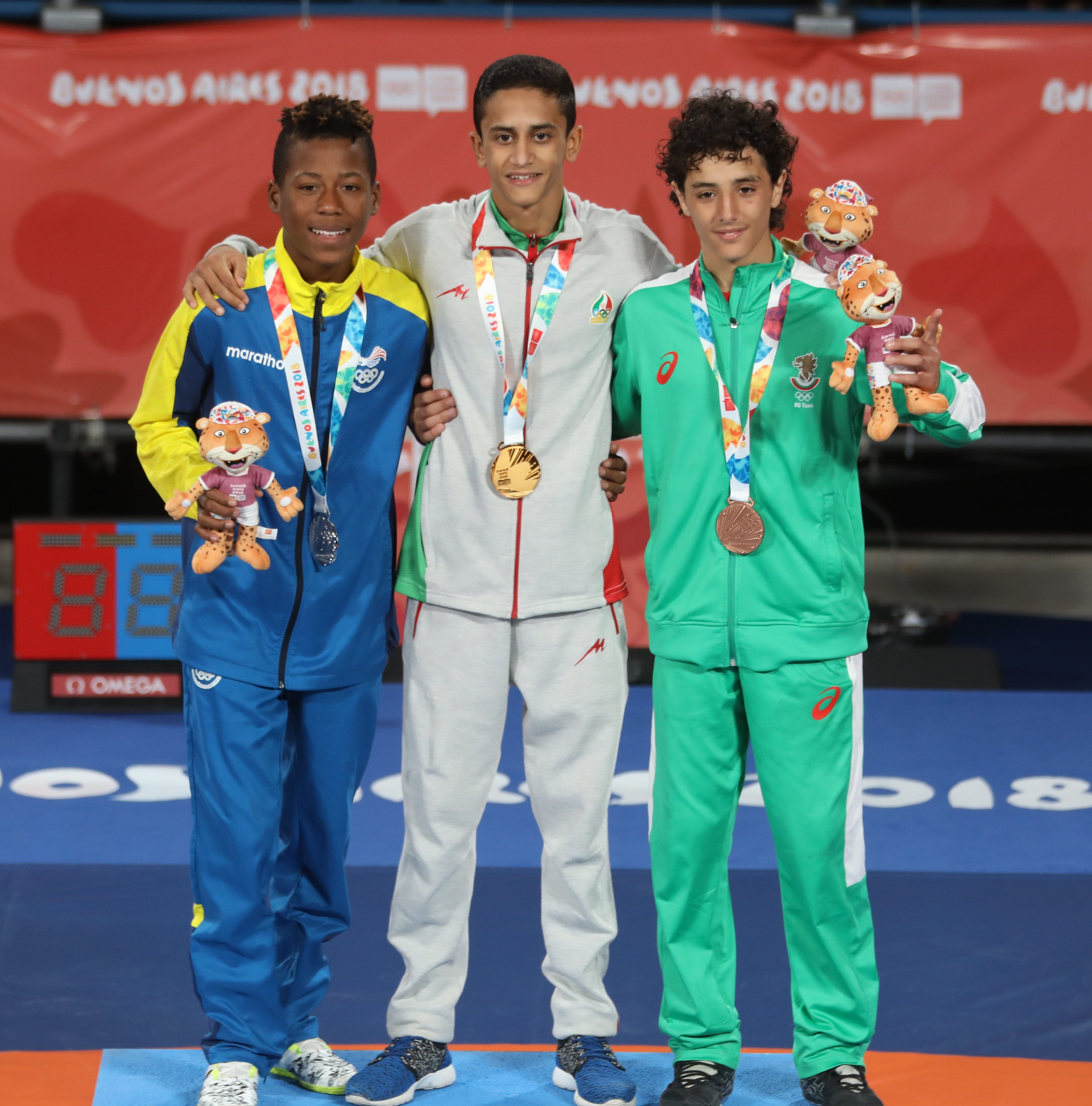
Victory ceremony (from left to right): Jeremy Peralta (Silver), Amir Reza Dehbozorgi (Gold), Edmond Nazaryan (Bronze)
