= Ecuador at the 2018 Summer Youth Olympics =

- IOC code: ECU
- NOC: Ecuadorian National Olympic Committee
- Website: http://www.coe.org.ec/

in Buenos Aires, Argentina 6 – 18 October 2018
- Competitors: 29 in 12 sports
- Medals Ranked 49th: Gold 1 Silver 2 Bronze 2 Total 5

Summer Youth Olympics appearances
- 2010; 2014; 2018; 2026

Ecuador participated at the 2018 Summer Youth Olympics in Buenos Aires, Argentina from 6 October to 18 October 2018.

== Medalists ==
Medals awarded to participants of mixed-NOC teams are represented in italics. These medals are not counted towards the individual NOC medal tally.

Medal	Name	Sport	Event	Date
Gold	Óscar Patín	Athletics	Boys' 5000 metre walk	15 October
Silver	Juleisy Angulo	Athletics	Girls' Javelin throw	16 October
Silver	Pablo Calvache	Gymnastics	Multidiscipline	10 October
Silver	Jeremy Peralta	Wrestling	Boys' Greco-Roman −45kg	12 October
Bronze	Gabriela Anahí Suárez	Athletics	100 metres	15 October
Bronze	Edith Ortiz	Judo	Mixed team	10 October
Bronze	Darlyn Padilla	Taekwondo	Boys' −73 kg	10 October

Medals by sport
Sport	1st place, gold medalist(s)	2nd place, silver medalist(s)	3rd place, bronze medalist(s)	Total
Athletics	1	1	1	3
Taekwondo	0	0	1	1
Wrestling	0	1	0	1
Total	1	2	2	5

== Athletics ==
Boys
Track and road events

Athlete	Event	Stage 1		Stage 2		Total	
Athlete	Event	Distance	Rank	Distance	Rank	Distance	Rank
Oscar Patin	5000 metre walk	20:13.69	1	20:38.17	2	20:13.69	1st place, gold medalist(s)

Field events

Athlete	Event	Stage 1		Stage 2		Total	
Athlete	Event	Distance	Rank	Distance	Rank	Distance	Rank
Kevin Bueno	Triple jump	14.88	13	15.04	10	29.92	10
Justine Herrera	High jump	1.90	16	1.93	14	3.83	14
Jean Mairongo	Javelin throw	74.32	4	72.22	6	146.54	5

Girls
Track and road events

Athlete	Event	Stage 1		Stage 2		Total	
Athlete	Event	Distance	Rank	Distance	Rank	Distance	Rank
Anahí Suárez	100 metres	11.97	1	11.29	3	23.26	3rd place, bronze medalist(s)
Aimara Nazareno	100 metre hurdles	14.10	10	13.73	8	27.83	9
Maria Villalva	5000 metre walk	22:48.75	4	23:26.70	3	46:15.45	4

Field events

Athlete	Event	Stage 1		Stage 2		Total	
Athlete	Event	Distance	Rank	Distance	Rank	Distance	Rank
Lorna Zurita	Shot put	14.73	11	15.79	5	30.52	7
Juleisy Angulo	Javelin throw	59.82	2	55.21	4	115.03	2nd place, silver medalist(s)

== Beach volleyball ==
Ecuador qualified a boys' team based on their overall ranking from the South American Youth Tour.

Athletes	Event	Preliminary round		Round of 24	Round of 16	Quarterfinals	Semifinals	Final / BM	
Athletes	Event	Opposition Score	Rank	Opposition Score	Opposition Score	Opposition Score	Opposition Score	Opposition Score	Rank
Leon–Jurado	Boys' tournament	Guvu–Monjane (MOZ); W 2-0; Santiago–Rivera (PUR); W 2-1; Esther–Namah (MRI); W 2-0	1	Bye	Amieva–Zelayeta (ARG); L 0-2	did not advance			
Ariana–Karelys	Girls' tournament	Álvarez M.–Moreno (ESP); L 0-2; Thatsarida–Pawarun (THA); L 0-2; Vargas–Corbacho (URU); L 1-2	4	did not advance					

== Cycling ==
Ecuador qualified a mixed BMX racing team based on its ranking in the Youth Olympic Games BMX Junior Nation Rankings.

- Mixed BMX racing team - 1 team of 2 athletes

BMX racing

Athlete	Event	Semifinal		Final			Total points	Rank
Athlete	Event	Points	Rank	Result	Rank	Points	Total points	Rank
Efrain Chamorro	Mixed BMX racing	7	2	35.729	3	8	73	6
Sylvia Ochoa	Mixed BMX racing	18	6	did not advance		65	73	6

== Gymnastics ==
=== Artistic ===
Ecuador qualified one gymnast based on its performance at the 2018 European Junior Championship.

- Boys' artistic individual all-around - 1 quota

Boys

Athlete	Event	Apparatus						Total	Rank
Athlete	Event	F	PH	R	V	PB	HB	Total	Rank
Pablo Calvache	Qualification	12.266	9.658	12.566	14.000	11.800	12.566	72.856	23
Pablo Calvache	Horizontal bar	—N/a					12.566	12.566	11

=== Multidiscipline ===
Team	Athlete	Acrobatic	Artistic	Rhythmic	Trampoline	Total points	Rank
Team Max Whitlock (Green)	Madalena Cavilhas (POR); Manuel Candeias (POR)	20	—N/a			349	2nd place, silver medalist(s)
Team Max Whitlock (Green)	Fernando Espíndola (ARG)	—N/a	43	—N/a		349	2nd place, silver medalist(s)
Team Max Whitlock (Green)	Takeru Kitazono (JPN)	—N/a	17	—N/a		349	2nd place, silver medalist(s)
Team Max Whitlock (Green)	Pablo Calvache (ECU)	—N/a	59	—N/a		349	2nd place, silver medalist(s)
Team Max Whitlock (Green)	Camila Montoya (CRC)	—N/a	69	—N/a		349	2nd place, silver medalist(s)
Team Max Whitlock (Green)	Ksenia Klimenko (RUS)	—N/a	11	—N/a		349	2nd place, silver medalist(s)
Team Max Whitlock (Green)	Zeina Ibrahim (EGY)	—N/a	15	—N/a		349	2nd place, silver medalist(s)
Team Max Whitlock (Green)	Rayna Khai Ling Hoh (MAS)	—N/a		18	—N/a	349	2nd place, silver medalist(s)
Team Max Whitlock (Green)	Roza Abitova (KAZ)	—N/a		26	—N/a	349	2nd place, silver medalist(s)
Team Max Whitlock (Green)	Adelina Beljajeva (EST)	—N/a		47	—N/a	349	2nd place, silver medalist(s)
Team Max Whitlock (Green)	Robert Vilarasau (ESP)	—N/a			11	349	2nd place, silver medalist(s)
Team Max Whitlock (Green)	Jessica Clarke (GBR)	—N/a			13	349	2nd place, silver medalist(s)

== Judo ==
Individual

Athlete	Event	Round of 16	Quarterfinals	Semifinals	Rep 1	Rep 2	Rep 3	Final / BM	
Athlete	Event	Opposition Result	Opposition Result	Opposition Result	Opposition Result	Opposition Result	Opposition Result	Opposition Result	Rank
Bryan Garboa	Boys' 55 kg	Bye	Oleh Veredyba (UKR); L 00s1-10	did not advance	—N/a	Yuri Israelyan (ARM); W 10s2-00s3	Ariel Shulman (ISR); L 00-10	did not advance	5
Edith Ortiz	Girls' 78 kg	Tiguidanke Camara (GUI); W 10-00	Margarita Gritsenko (KAZ); L 00-10	did not advance	Bye	Christi-Rose Pretorius (ZIM); W 11-00	Liu Li-ling (TPE); W 10-00s2	Eduarda Rosa (BRA); L 00H-10s2	4

Team

Athletes	Event	Round of 16	Quarterfinals	Semifinals	Final	
Athletes	Event	Opposition Result	Opposition Result	Opposition Result	Opposition Result	Rank
Team London; Yangchen Wangmo (BHU); Daniel Leutgeb (AUT); Noemi Huayhuameza Orneta (PER); Joao Santos (BRA); Rachel Krapman (CAN); Ahmed Rebahi (ALG); Edith Ortiz (ECU); Bekarys Saduakas (KAZ)	Mixed team	Bye	Team Moscow (MIX); W 4–3	Team Beijing (MIX); L 0–7	did not advance	3rd place, bronze medalist(s)
Team Singapore; Ahad Al-Sagheer (YEM); Anastasia Balaban (UKR); Bryan Garboa (ECU); Sarah Kafufula (COD); Mariem Khlifi (TUN); Ahmed Mohamed Fahmy (EGY); Eduarda Rosa (BRA); Ilia Sulamanidze (GEO)	Mixed team	Team Moscow (MIX); L 3–4	did not advance			

== Sport climbing ==
Ecuador qualified one sport climber based on its performance at the 2017 Pan American Youth Sport Climbing Championships.

- Boys' combined - 1 quota (Galo Hernandez)

== Taekwondo ==
Athlete	Event	Round of 16	Quarterfinals	Semifinals	Final / BM	
Athlete	Event	Opposition Result	Opposition Result	Opposition Result	Opposition Result	Rank
Darlyn Padilla	Boys' −73 kg	Bye	Dušan Božanić (SRB); W 23-20	Ali Eshkevarian (IRI); L 5-29	did not advance	3rd place, bronze medalist(s)

== Triathlon ==
Ecuador qualified two athletes based on its performance at the 2018 American Youth Olympic Games Qualifier.

Individual

Athlete	Event	Swim (750m)	Trans 1	Bike (20 km)	Trans 2	Run (5 km)	Total Time	Rank
Gabriel Terán Carvajal	Boys	9:44	0:28	28:39	0:29	17:38	56:58	17
Paula Vega	Girls	10:11	0:40	30:09	0:30	18:19	59:49	5

Relay

Athlete	Event	Total Times per Athlete (Swim 250m, Bike 6.6 km, Run 1.8 km)	Total Group Time	Rank
Americas 1 Paula Vega (ECU); Cristobal Baeza Muñoz (CHI); Sofia Rodríguez Moreno (MEX); Andrew Shellenberger (USA)	Mixed Relay	22:11 (3) - - -	DNF	
Americas 3 Delfina Orlandini (ARG); Gabriel Terán Carvajal (ECU); Maria Fernanda Barbosa Sánchez (COL); Solen Wood (CAN)	Mixed Relay	22:49 (7); 21:27 (7); 24:52 (9); 22:35 (8)	1:31:43	7

== Weightlifting ==
Ecuador qualified one athlete based on its performance at the 2017 World Youth Championships.

Boy

Athlete	Event	Snatch		Clean & Jerk		Total	Rank
Athlete	Event	Result	Rank	Result	Rank	Total	Rank
Carlos Emilio Escudero Nájera	+85 kg	150	4	175	4	325	4

Girl

Athlete	Event	Snatch		Clean & jerk		Total	Rank
Athlete	Event	Result	Rank	Result	Rank	Total	Rank
Bella Paredes	+63 kg	90	4	113	4	203	4

== Wrestling ==
Key:
- VFA – Victory by Fall
- VSU – Without any points scored by the opponent
- VSU1 – With point(s) scored by the opponent
- VPO – Without any points scored by the opponent
- VPO1 – With point(s) scored by the opponent

Athlete	Event	Group stage			Final / RM	Rank
Athlete	Event	Opposition Score	Opposition Score	Rank	Opposition Score	Rank
Jeremy Peralta	Boys' Greco-Roman −45kg	de Jesús (HON); W 7 – 0 ^{VFA}	Zakirbayev (TKM); W 7 – 4 ^{VPO1}	1 Q	Dehbozorgi (IRI); L 0 – 8 ^{VSU}	2nd place, silver medalist(s)
