= Meşəşambul =

- Municipality
- Location within Azerbaijan Location within Shaki-Zagatala Economic Region
- Coordinates: 41°42′12″N 46°16′24″E
- Country: Azerbaijan
- Rayon: Balakan

Population
  - Total: 3,438
- Time zone: UTC+4 (AZT)
  - Summer (DST): UTC+5 (AZT)

Meşəşambul (Avar: Рохьоб) is a village and municipality in the Balakan Rayon of Azerbaijan. It has a population of 3,438. The municipality consists of the villages of Meşəşambul and Qazbölük.

== Notable natives ==
- Ramazan Chirinqov — National Hero of Azerbaijan.
- Murad Bazarov — 2010 Youth Olympic Games winner.
