= Honduras at the 2018 Summer Youth Olympics =

- IOC code: HON
- NOC: Honduran Olympic Committee

in Buenos Aires, Argentina 6 – 18 October 2018
- Competitors: 4 in 4 sports
- Medals Ranked 83rd: Gold 0 Silver 0 Bronze 1 Total 1

Summer Youth Olympics appearances
- 2010; 2014; 2018; 2026

Honduras participated at the 2018 Summer Youth Olympics in Buenos Aires, Argentina from 6 October to 18 October 2018.

== Equestrian ==
Honduras qualified a rider based on its ranking in the FEI World Jumping Challenge Rankings.

- Individual Jumping - 1 athlete

Athlete	Horse	Event	Round 1		Round 2			Total		Jump off		
Athlete	Horse	Event	Penalties	Rank	Penalties	Total	Rank	Penalties	Rank	Penalties	Total	Rank
Pedro Espinosa	Llavaneras Genquina	Individual Jumping	0	1	0	0	1	0	1	4	4	3rd place, bronze medalist(s)
North America; Nicole Meyer Robredo (MEX); Mateo Philippe Coles (HAI); Marissa del Pilar Thompson (PAN); Pedro Espinosa (HON); Mattie Hatcher (USA)	El Capricho Champion; Quid Du Plessis; Canal Del Bajo Kithira; Llavaneras Genquina; Santa Rosa Valery	Team Jumping	4 # 0; 0; 0; 0 #	0	4 # 0; 0; 4 # 0	0	0	4 # 0 # 0; 0; 0	0	38.07 # 34.55 # 34.07; 32.16; 31.66	97.89	1st place, gold medalist(s)

== Wrestling ==
Key:
- VFA – Victory by Fall
- VSU – Without any point scored by the opponent

Athlete	Event	Group stage			Final / RM	Rank
Athlete	Event	Opposition Score	Opposition Score	Rank	Opposition Score	Rank
Denzel de Jesús	Boys' Greco-Roman −45kg	Zakirbayev (TKM); L 0 – 9 ^{VSU}	Peralta (ECU); L 0 – 7 ^{VFA}	3 Q	Shaaban (EGY); L 1 – 12 ^{VFA}	6
