= 2023 World Wrestling Championships – Men's Greco-Roman 63 kg =

Wrestling competitions

Men's Greco-Roman 63 kg at the 2023 World Championships
- Venue: Štark Arena
- Dates: 23–24 September 2023
- Competitors: 24 from 22 nations

Medalists
| gold medal | Leri Abuladze | Georgia |
| silver medal | Murad Mammadov | Azerbaijan |
| bronze medal | Enes Başar | Turkey |
| bronze medal | Georgii Tibilov | Serbia |

The men's Greco-Roman 63 kilograms is a competition featured at the 2023 World Wrestling Championships, and was held in Belgrade, Serbia on 23 and 24 September 2023.

This Greco-Roman wrestling competition consists of a single-elimination tournament, with a repechage used to determine the winner of two bronze medals. The two finalists face off for gold and silver medals. Each wrestler who loses to one of the two finalists moves into the repechage, culminating in a pair of bronze medal matches featuring the semifinal losers each facing the remaining repechage opponent from their half of the bracket.

Leri Abuladze of Georgia won the gold medal.

== Results ==
=== Final ===
| Final |
| Leri Abuladze (GEO) | 2 |
| Murad Mammadov (AZE) | 2 |

=== Top half ===
Round of 32
Ryuto Ikeda (JPN) | 0
Enes Başar (TUR) | 9
Oleksandr Hrushyn (UKR) | 4
Alamusi (CHN) | 1
Alexis Rodríguez (MEX) | 3
Stefan Clément (FRA) | 9
Jung Jin-woong (KOR) | 0
Astemir Bizhoev (AIN) | 4

Round of 16
Leri Abuladze (GEO) | 4
Enes Başar (TUR) | 3
Oleksandr Hrushyn (UKR) | 8
Dastan Kadyrov (KGZ) | 0
Shermukhammad Sharibjanov (UZB) | 0
Stefan Clément (FRA) | 7
Astemir Bizhoev (AIN) | 5
Mukhamedali Mamurbek (KAZ) | 5

Quarterfinals
Leri Abuladze (GEO) | 1
Oleksandr Hrushyn (UKR) | 1
Stefan Clément (FRA) | 9
Astemir Bizhoev (AIN) | 0

Semifinals
Leri Abuladze (GEO) | 3
Stefan Clément (FRA) | 1

=== Bottom half ===
Round of 32
Georgii Tibilov (SRB) | 8
Mairbek Salimov (POL) | 0
Etienne Kinsinger (GER) | 3
Krisztián Kecskeméti (HUN) | 3
Xavier Johnson (USA) | 10
Vikram Kurade (UWW) | 0
Abu Muslim Amaev (BUL) | 11
Akmyrat Geldiýew (TKM) | 0

Round of 16
Iman Mohammadi (IRI) | 2
Georgii Tibilov (SRB) | 12
Krisztián Kecskeméti (HUN) | 0
Ivan Lizatović (CRO) | 4
Murad Mammadov (AZE) | 3
Xavier Johnson (USA) | 1
Abu Muslim Amaev (BUL) | 1
Hrachya Poghosyan (ARM) | 7

Quarterfinals
Georgii Tibilov (SRB) | 5
Ivan Lizatović (CRO) | 2
Murad Mammadov (AZE) | 3
Hrachya Poghosyan (ARM) | 1

Semifinals
Georgii Tibilov (SRB) | 1
Murad Mammadov (AZE) | 4

=== Repechage ===
Repechage round 2
Enes Başar (TUR) | 8
Oleksandr Hrushyn (UKR) | 0
Xavier Johnson (USA) | 0
Hrachya Poghosyan (ARM) | 8

Bronze medals
Enes Başar (TUR) | 9
Stefan Clément (FRA) | 6
Hrachya Poghosyan (ARM) | 0
Georgii Tibilov (SRB) | 4

== Final standing ==
| Rank | Athlete |
|---|---|
| 1st place, gold medalist(s) | Leri Abuladze (GEO) |
| 2nd place, silver medalist(s) | Murad Mammadov (AZE) |
| 3rd place, bronze medalist(s) | Enes Başar (TUR) |
| 3rd place, bronze medalist(s) | Georgii Tibilov (SRB) |
| 5 | Stefan Clément (FRA) |
| 5 | Hrachya Poghosyan (ARM) |
| 7 | Oleksandr Hrushyn (UKR) |
| 8 | Astemir Bizhoev (AIN) |
| 9 | Abu Muslim Amaev (BUL) |
| 10 | Xavier Johnson (USA) |
| 11 | Ivan Lizatović (CRO) |
| 12 | Krisztián Kecskeméti (HUN) |
| 13 | Mukhamedali Mamurbek (KAZ) |
| 14 | Etienne Kinsinger (GER) |
| 15 | Alexis Rodríguez (MEX) |
| 16 | Iman Mohammadi (IRI) |
| 17 | Alamusi (CHN) |
| 18 | Jung Jin-woong (KOR) |
| 19 | Shermukhammad Sharibjanov (UZB) |
| 20 | Dastan Kadyrov (KGZ) |
| 21 | Mairbek Salimov (POL) |
| 22 | Ryuto Ikeda (JPN) |
| 23 | Vikram Kurade (UWW) |
| 24 | Akmyrat Geldiýew (TKM) |
