= Nihat Mammadli =

Azerbaijani Greco-Roman wrestler

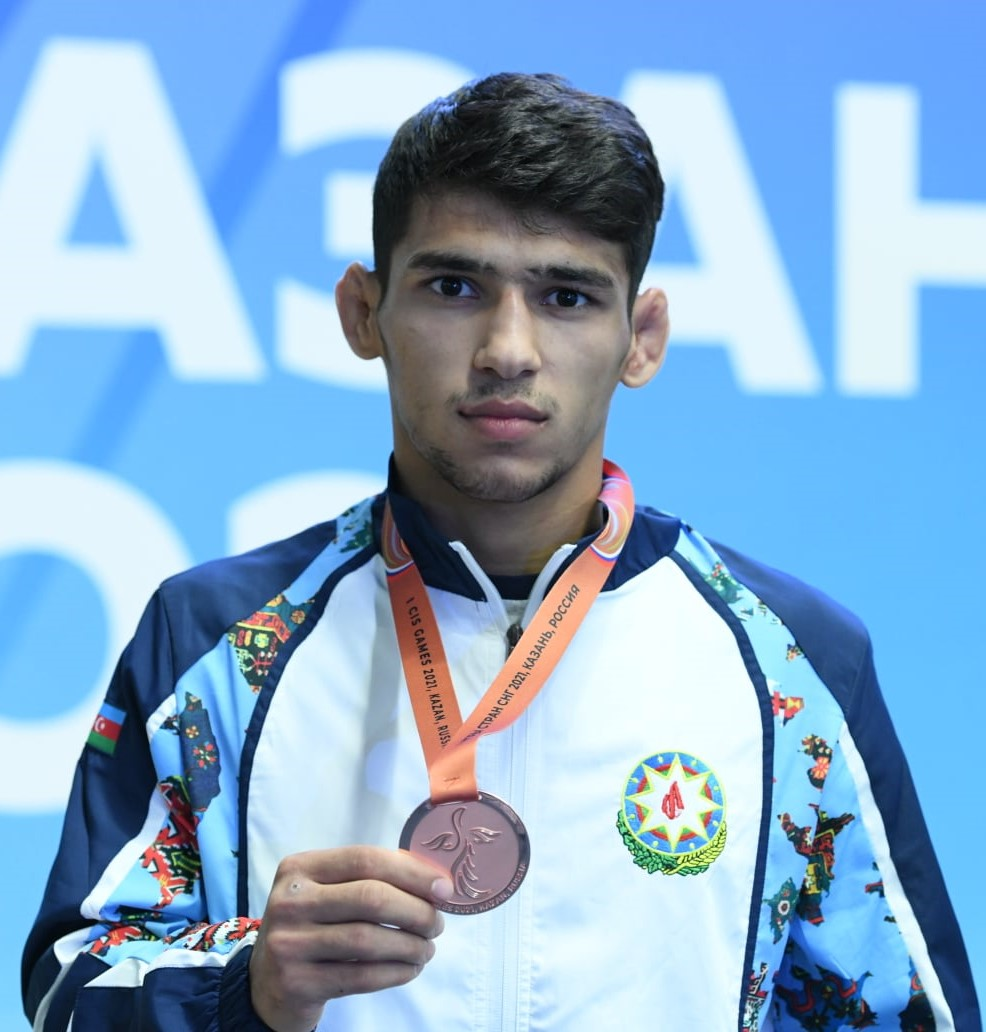

Personal information
- Nationality: Azerbaijan
- Born: Nihat Zahid Mammadli; 21 July 2002 (age 24) Fuzuli, Azerbaijan
- Height: 1.66 m (5 ft 5 in)
- Weight: 60 kg (130 lb; 9.4 st)

Sport
- Country: Azerbaijan
- Sport: Amateur wrestling
- Weight class: 60 kg
- Event: Greco-Roman
Medal record
Men's Greco-Roman wrestling
Representing Azerbaijan
World Championships
Gold medal – first place	2024 Tirana	63 kg
Silver medal – second place	2026 Astana	63 kg
European Championships
Gold medal – first place	2025 Bratislava	60 kg
Gold medal – first place	2024 Bucharest	60 kg
Bronze medal – third place	2023 Zagreb	60 kg
World Cup
Silver medal – second place	2022 Baku	Team
Grand Prix
Silver medal – second place	2023 Zagreb	60 kg
Bronze medal – third place	2023 Budapest	60 kg
World U23 Championships
Silver medal – second place	2022 Pontevedra	60 kg
European U23 Championship
Gold medal – first place	2022 Plovdiv	60 kg
World Juniors Championships
Bronze medal – third place	2021 Ufa	60 kg
European Juniors Championships
Bronze medal – third place	2021 Dortmund	60 kg
World Cadets Championships
Gold medal – first place	2019 Sofia	55 kg
Silver medal – second place	2017 Athens	46 kg
European Cadets Championships
Gold medal – first place	2019 Faenza	55 kg

Nihat Zahid Mammadli (born 21 July 2002) is an Azerbaijani Greco-Roman wrestler competing in the 60 kg division. He won the gold medal at the 2024 European Wrestling Championships.

== Career ==
Nihat Mammadli won the silver medal of the World Junior Championship, which took place in Athens, Greece in 2017.

In 2019, Nihat Mammadli won the European Junior Championship in Faentsa Italy in June and the World Junior Championship in Sofia Bulgaria in July. Nihat Mammadli also won the bronze medal of the European Youth Olympic Festival, which took place in June.

In 2021, Nihat Mammadli won bronze medals at the European Junior Championship in Dortmund Germany and the World Junior Championship in Ufa Russia. In 2022, Nihat Mammadli won gold medals of the U23 European Championship in Plovdiv Poland, bronze medals of the U20 European Championship in Rome Italy and the U20 World Championship in Sofia Bulgaria, and silver medals of the U23 World Championship in Pontevedra Spain. Nihat Mammadli also won the bronze medal of the Matteo Pellicone international tournament, which took place in Rome, Italy in June.

In March 2022, he became the European champion among wrestlers under the age of 23 in Bulgaria. In June of the same year, he became the bronze medalist of the Matteo Pellicone Memorial Tournament and the 2022 European Championship among wrestlers under 20 in Italy. In August 2022, he again won bronze at the World Championship among wrestlers under 20 in Bulgaria. In October of the same year, he became the silver medalist of the World Championship among wrestlers under 23 in Spain.

Nihat Mammadli became the European champion for the first time at the 2024 European Wrestling Championships in Bucharest, Romania by defeating Georgian Victor Ciobanu 8–3 in the final match of the men's 60 kg wrestling championships.

He competed at the 2024 European Wrestling Olympic Qualification Tournament in Baku, Azerbaijan hoping to qualify for the 2024 Summer Olympics in Paris, France. He was eliminated in his second match and he did not qualify for the Olympics.

On October 26, 2026, at the World Championship in Astana, he defeated Qatar's representative Aref Mohammadi in the quarterfinal, and in the semifinal he defeated Russia's representative Sergey Emelin.

== Achievements ==
Year	Tournament	Location	Result	Event
2023	European Championships	Zagreb, Croatia	3rd	Greco-Roman 60 kg
2024	European Championships	Bucharest, Romania	1st	Greco-Roman 60 kg
2025	European Championships	Bratislava, Slovakia	1st	Greco-Roman 60 kg
