= Răzvan Arnăut =

Romanian Greco-Roman wrestler

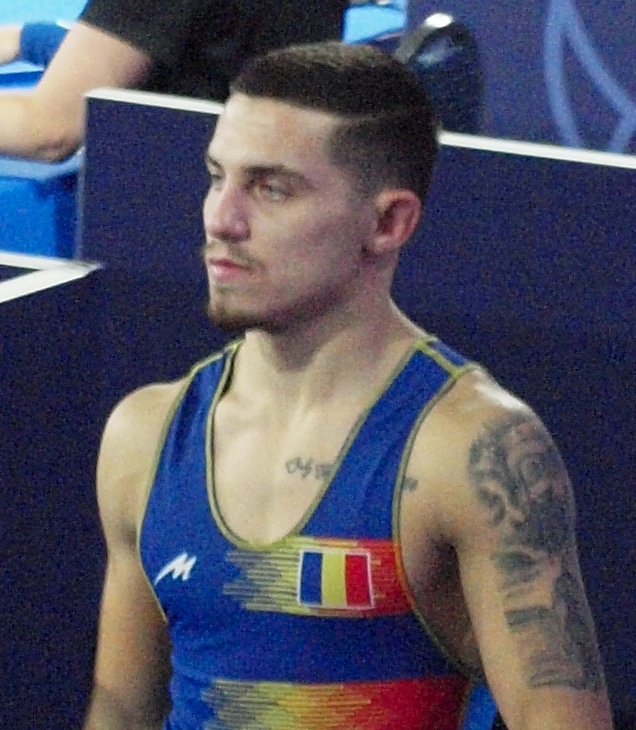

Personal information
- Nationality: Romania
- Born: 28 September 1998 (age 27) Constanța, Romania
- Height: 1.60 m (5 ft 3 in)
- Weight: 60 kg (132 lb)

Sport
- Country: Romania
- Sport: Amateur wrestling
- Weight class: 60 kg
- Event: Greco-Roman
Medal record
Men's Greco-Roman wrestling
Representing Romania
European Championships
Bronze medal – third place	2021 Warsaw	60 kg
Bronze medal – third place	2024 Bucharest	60 kg
Grand Prix
Bronze medal – third place	2022 Warsaw	63 kg
Bronze medal – third place	2022 Rome	63 kg
Bronze medal – third place	2023 Zagreb	60 kg
Bronze medal – third place	2023 Alexandria	60 kg
Bronze medal – third place	2025 Zagreb	67 kg
European U23 Championship
Silver medal – second place	2019 Novi Sad	60 kg

Răzvan Arnăut (born 28 September 1998) is a Romanian Greco-Roman wrestler competing in the 60 kg division.

== Career ==
In 2024, Arnăut won one of the bronze medals in the 60 kg event at the European Wrestling Championships held in Bucharest, Romania. He competed at the 2024 European Wrestling Olympic Qualification Tournament in Baku, Azerbaijan hoping to qualify for the 2024 Summer Olympics in Paris, France. He was eliminated in his first match and he did not qualify for the Olympics. Arnăut also competed at the 2024 World Wrestling Olympic Qualification Tournament held in Istanbul, Turkey without qualifying for the Olympics. He was able to compete at the Olympics as Russian wrestler Sadyk Lalaev qualified but did not compete at the Olympics. Arnăut competed in the 60 kg event at the Olympics.

== Achievements ==
Year	Tournament	Location	Result	Event
2021	European Championships	Warsaw, Poland	3rd	Greco-Roman 60 kg
2024	European Championships	Bucharest, Romania	3rd	Greco-Roman 60 kg
Olympic Games	Paris, France	9th	Greco-Roman 60 kg	
