= Enes Başar =

Turkish Greco-Roman wrestler (born 1993)

Personal information
- Born: 30 April 1993 (age 33) Istanbul, Turkey
- Height: 165 cm (5 ft 5 in)
- Weight: 60 kg (132 lb)

Sport
- Country: Turkey
- Sport: Amateur wrestling
- Event: Greco-Roman
- Club: Ankara Aski Sport Club
Medal record
Men's Greco-Roman wrestling
Representing Turkey
World Championships
Bronze medal – third place	2023 Serbia	63 kg
European Championships
Bronze medal – third place	2018 Kaspiysk	67 kg
Vehbi Emre & Hamit Kaplan Tournament
Gold medal – first place	2023 Istanbul	63 kg
Gold medal – first place	2025 Kocaeli	63 kg
Bronze medal – third place	2024 Antalya	63 kg
Bronze medal – third place	2026 Antalya	63 kg
Dan Kolov & Nikola Petrov Tournament
Gold medal – first place	2026 Plovdiv	63 kg
Grand Prix
Gold medal – first place	2025 Ulaanbaatar	60 kg
European U23 Championship
Bronze medal – third place	2015 Walbrzych	66 kg
Bronze medal – third place	2016 Russe	67 kg
World Juniors Championships
Silver medal – second place	2013 Sofia	60 kg
Bronze medal – third place	2012 Pattaya	60 kg
World University Wrestling Championships
Gold medal – first place	2016 Çorum	66 kg
European Cadets Championships
Gold medal – first place	2009 Zrenjanin	46 kg
Bronze medal – third place	2008 Daugavpils	42 kg

Enes Başar (born 30 April 1993) is a Turkish Greco-Roman wrestler. He won one of the bronze medals in the 67 kg event at the 2018 European Wrestling Championships held in Kaspiysk, Russia.

== Career ==
In 2019, he represented Turkey at the European Games held in Minsk, Belarus in the 67 kg event without winning a medal. In 2020, he competed in the 67 kg event at the European Wrestling Championships held in Rome, Italy, also without winning a medal.

Enes Başar won the bronze medal by defeating his French rival Stéfan Clément 9-6 in the third place match of the men's 63 kg wrestling championship at the 2023 World Wrestling Championships in Belgrade, Serbia. Enes Başar defeated Japanese Ryuto Ikeda 8-0 with technical superiority in the first round and advanced to the second round. He lost 4-3 to Georgian Leri Abuladze in the second round. His opponent reached the final and qualified for the repechage. In the first round of the repechage, he defeated his Ukrainian opponent Oleksandr Hrushyn with 8-0 technical superiority and reached the bronze medal match.

He competed at the 2024 European Wrestling Olympic Qualification Tournament in Baku, Azerbaijan and he earned a quota place for Turkey for the 2024 Summer Olympics in Paris, France. He competed in the 60 kg event at the Olympics.

== Achievements ==
Year	Tournament	Location	Result	Event
2018	European Championships	Kaspiysk, Russia	3rd	Greco-Roman 67 kg
2023	World Championships	Belgrade, Serbia	3rd	Greco-Roman 63 kg
