= Murad Mammadov =

Azerbaijani Greco-Roman wrestler

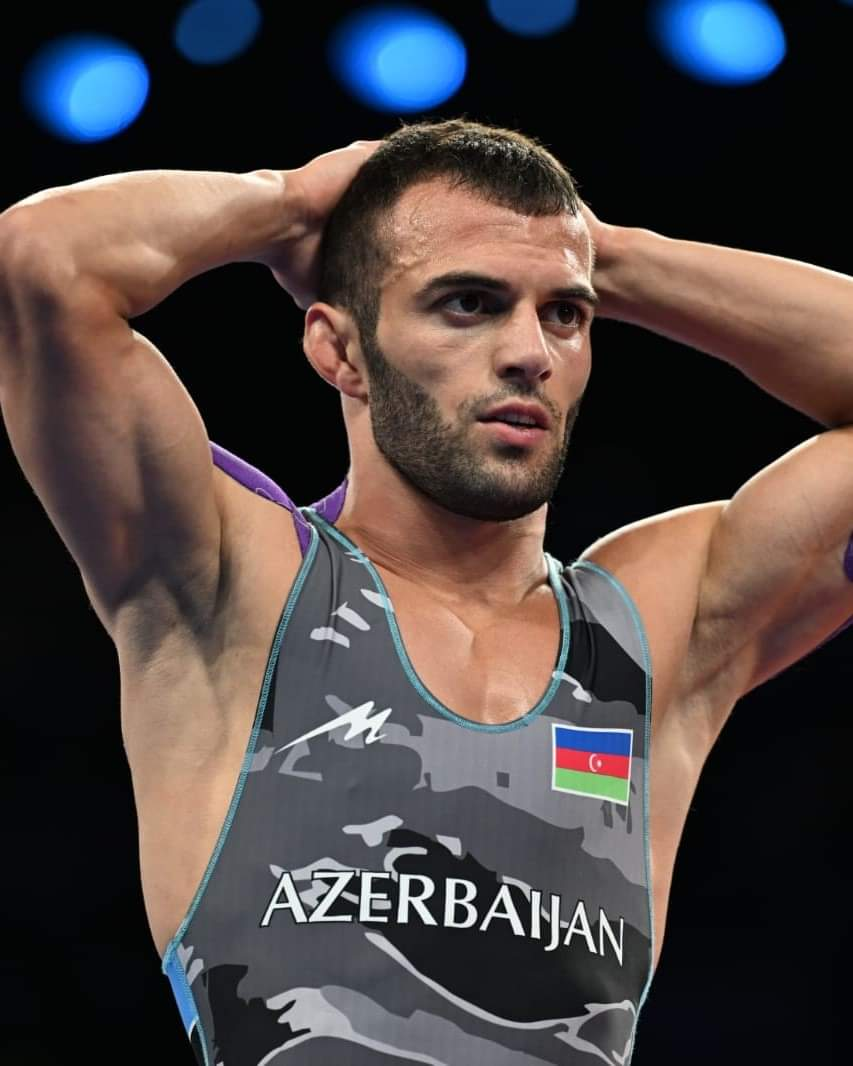
- Mammadov at the 2024 Summer Olympics

Personal information
- Born: 12 August 1995 (age 30) Sumgait, Azerbaijan

Sport
- Country: Azerbaijan
- Sport: Amateur wrestling
- Event: Greco-Roman
Medal record
Men's Greco-Roman wrestling
Representing Azerbaijan
World Championships
Silver medal – second place	2023 Belgrade	63 kg
Bronze medal – third place	2021 Oslo	60 kg
European Championships
Gold medal – first place	2024 Bucharest	63 kg
Silver medal – second place	2018 Kaspiysk	60 kg
Bronze medal – third place	2022 Budapest	60 kg
Islamic Solidarity Games
Silver medal – second place	2021 Konya	60 kg
Bronze medal – third place	2017 Baku	59 kg
Grand Prix
Gold medal – first place	2022 Rome	60 kg
Gold medal – first place	2023 Budapest	63 kg
Gold medal – first place	2024 Budapest	63 kg
European U23 Championship
Gold medal – first place	2017 Szombathely	59 kg
Bronze medal – third place	2018 İstanbul	60 kg
World Junior Championships
Gold medal – first place	2014 Zagreb	55 kg
Gold medal – first place	2015 Salvador	55 kg
European Juniors Championships
Gold medal – first place	2014 Katowice	55 kg
Silver medal – second place	2015 İstanbul	55 kg

Murad Mammadov (Azerbaijani: Murad Məmmədov; born 12 August 1995) is an Azerbaijani Greco-Roman wrestler. He is a two-time medalist at the World Wrestling Championships and three-time medalist, including gold, at the European Wrestling Championships. He represented Azerbaijan at the 2024 Summer Olympics in Paris, France.

== Career ==
In 2021, Mammadov won a bronze medal in the 60 kg event at the 2021 World Wrestling Championships held in Oslo, Norway.

Mammadov also won a bronze medal in the 60 kg event at the 2022 European Wrestling Championships held in Budapest, Hungary. A few months later, he won the gold medal in his event at the Matteo Pellicone Ranking Series 2022 in Rome, Italy. He won the silver medal in his event at the 2021 Islamic Solidarity Games held in Konya, Turkey.

Mammadov won the gold medal in the 63 kg event at the 2024 European Wrestling Championships held in Bucharest, Romania, defeating Oleksandr Hrushyn of Ukraine in the final. He earned a quota place for Azerbaijan for the 2024 Summer Olympics at the World Wrestling Olympic Qualification Tournament held in Istanbul, Turkey.

Mammadov competed in the 60 kg event at the 2024 Summer Olympics held in Paris, France. He was eliminated in his first match by Raiber Rodríguez of Venezuela.

== Achievements ==
Year	Tournament	Location	Result	Event
2017	Islamic Solidarity Games	Baku, Azerbaijan	3rd	Greco-Roman 59 kg
2018	European Championships	Kaspiysk, Russia	2nd	Greco-Roman 60 kg
2021	World Championships	Oslo, Norway	3rd	Greco-Roman 60 kg
2022	European Championships	Budapest, Hungary	3rd	Greco-Roman 60 kg
2022	Islamic Solidarity Games	Konya, Turkey	2nd	Greco-Roman 60 kg
2023	World Championships	Belgrade, Serbia	2nd	Greco-Roman 63 kg
2024	European Championships	Bucharest, Romania	1st	Greco-Roman 63 kg
