= Xavier Johnson (wrestler) =

American wrestler (born 1995)

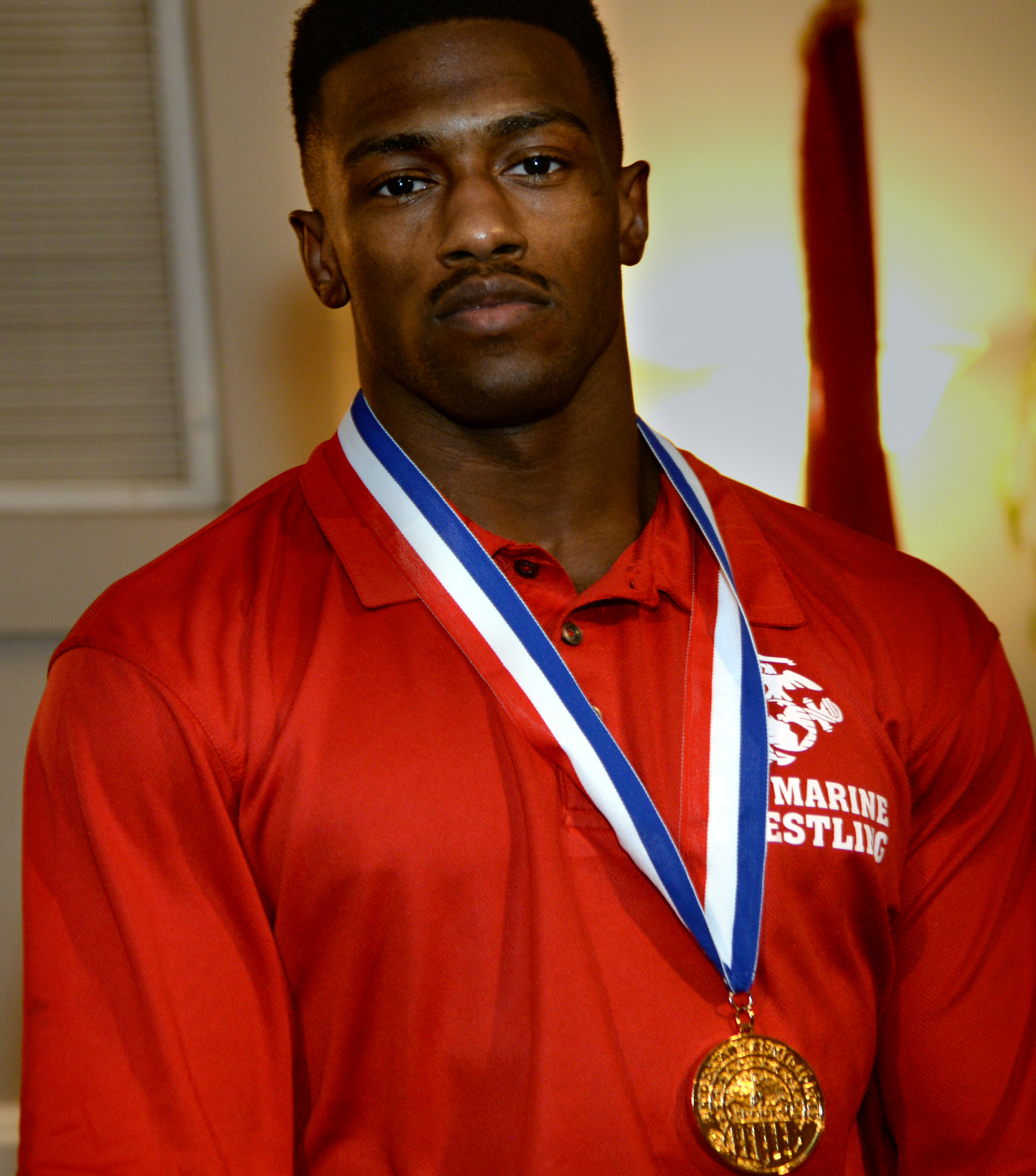
- Johnson in 2018

Personal information
- Born: July 3, 1995 (age 31) Orangeburg, South Carolina, U.S.

Sport
- Country: United States
- Sport: Wrestling
- Event: Greco-Roman
- Club: U.S. Army WCAP
- Team: USA
Medal record
Men's Greco-Roman wrestling
Representing the United States
Pan American Championships
Gold medal – first place	2021 Guatelama City	67 kg

Xavier Tramain Johnson (born July 3, 1995) is an American Greco-Roman wrestler. He represented the United States in Greco-Roman wrestling at the 2023 World Championships at 63 kg, where he placed 10th. Johnson was also a gold medalist at the 2021 Pan American Championships at 67 kg.

== Wrestling career ==
Johnson attended Edisto High School in Cordova, South Carolina. He started wrestling in 2010, after missing the school bus and not having a ride home. In 2012, he won the 2A-1A SCHSL 132-pound wrestling state championship.

Following high school, Johnson joined the United States Marines, where he competed on the All-Marine wrestling team as a Greco-Roman wrestler. In 2022, Johnson joined the United States Army, where he continued his wrestling career with the U.S. Army WCAP.

In 2023, Johnson earned the 63 kg representative spot for the United States in Greco-Roman wrestling at the 2023 World Championships, where he placed 10th.
