= Sadyk Lalaev =

Russian Greco-Roman wrestler

Personal information
- Full name: Sadyk Saleh Ogly Lalaev
- National team: Russia
- Born: Sadıq Saleh oğlu Lalayev; 23 October 1996 (age 29) Nizhny Novgorod, Russia
- Height: 1.67 m (5 ft 6 in)
- Weight: 60 kg (130 lb; 9.4 st)

Sport
- Country: Russia
- Sport: Amateur wrestling
- Event: Greco-Roman
- Coached by: Artur Marzakhanyan; Anatoly Konstantinov; Gennadiy Mannasov
Medal record
Men's Greco-Roman wrestling
Representing UWW
European Championships
Bronze medal – third place	2025 Bratislava	60 kg
Grand Prix
Bronze medal – third place	2026 Tirana	60 kg
Representing Individual Neutral Athletes
World Championships
Bronze medal – third place	2024 Tirana	63 kg
European Championships
Bronze medal – third place	2024 Bucharest	60 kg
Grand Prix
Gold medal – first place	2024 Zagreb	60 kg
Bronze medal – third place	2025 Zagreb	60 kg
Bronze medal – third place	2025 Budapest	60 kg
Representing Russia
European U23 Championship
Bronze medal – third place	2019 Novi Sad	60 kg

Sadyk Lalaev (Russian: Садык Салех оглы Лалаев; born 23 October 1996) is a Russian Greco-Roman wrestler of Azerbaijani origin who currently competes at 60 kilograms.

== Background ==
Lalaev was born in Nizhny Novgorod, Russia. At the age of the twelve he started Greco-Roman wrestling, where his first coach was Vladimir Kryukov.

== Wrestling career ==
He won one of the bronze medals in the 60 kg event at the 2024 European Wrestling Championships held in Bucharest, Romania. He earned a quota place for the Individual Neutral Athletes for the 2024 Summer Olympics at the World Wrestling Olympic Qualification Tournament held in Istanbul, Turkey.
