= Murad Bazarov =

Azerbaijani wrestler (born 1994)

Personal information
- Born: August 6, 1994 (age 31) Meşəşambul, Balakan Rayon, Azerbaijan
- Height: 1.52 m (5 ft 0 in)

Sport
- Country: Azerbaijan
- Sport: Weightlifting
- Event: 50 kg
Medal record
Junior World Championships
| Gold medal – first place | 2012 Pattaya | 50 kg |
Youth Olympic Games
| Gold medal – first place | 2010 Singapore | 42 kg |

Murad Bazarov (Azerbaijani: Murad Bazarov; born August 6, 1994) is an Azerbaijani wrestler who participated at the 2010 Summer Youth Olympics in Singapore. He won the gold medal for Azerbaijan in the boys' Greco-Roman 42 kg event, defeating Yosvanys Peña of Cuba in the final. In 2012 he won the gold medal at the 2012 World Junior Wrestling Championships in Pattaya, defeating Artur Labazanov of Russia in the final.
