= Edmond Nazaryan =

Bulgarian Greco-Roman wrestler

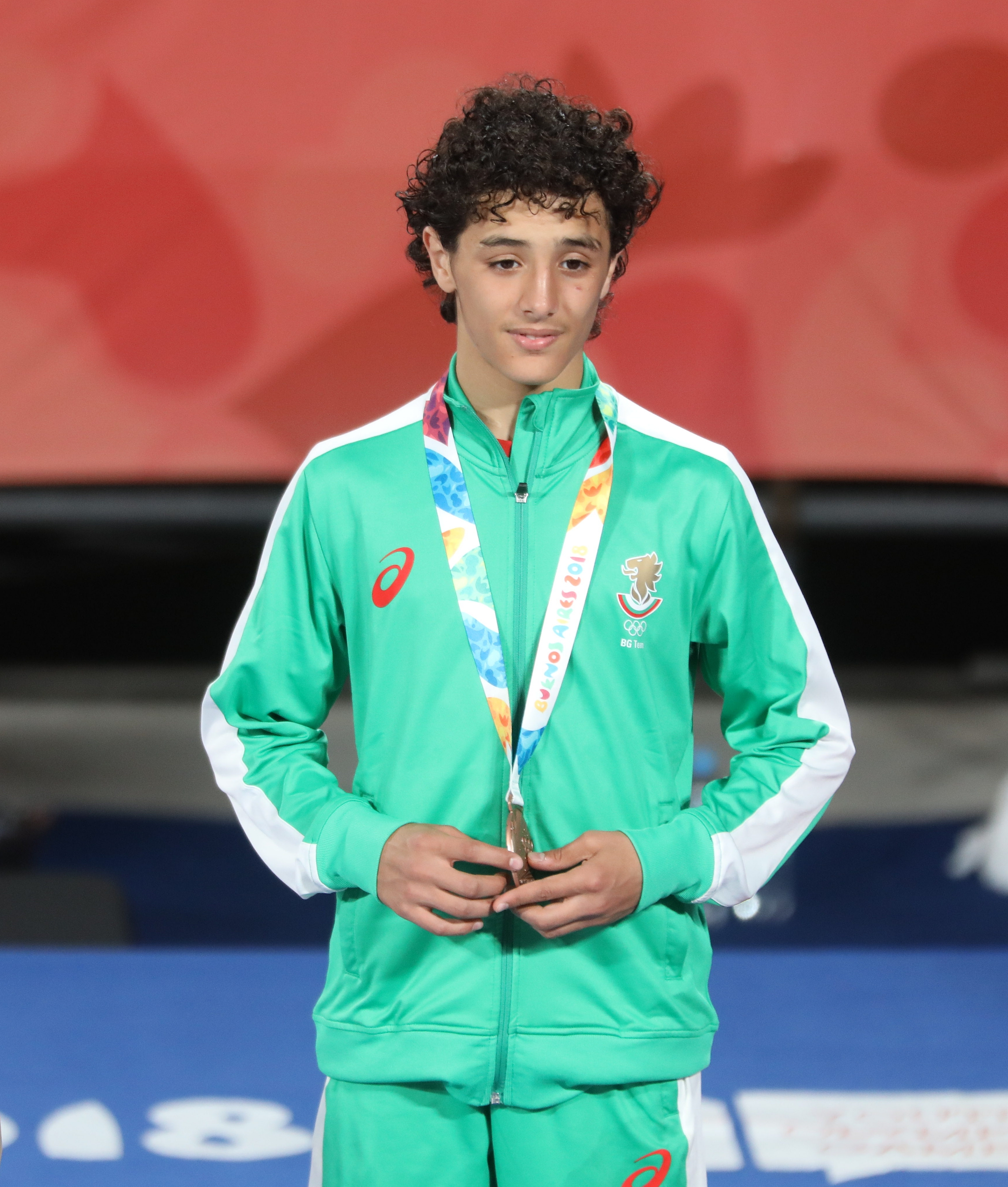
- Edmond Nazaryan (2018)

Personal information
- Native name: Едмонд Армен Назарян
- Full name: Edmond Armen Nazaryan
- Nationality: Bulgaria
- Born: 19 January 2002 (age 24) Sofia, Bulgaria
- Height: 165 cm (5 ft 5 in)

Sport
- Country: Bulgaria
- Sport: Wrestling
- Weight class: 60 kg
- Event: Greco-Roman
- Club: CSKA Sofia

Achievements and titles
- World finals: (silver) (2022)
- Regional finals: (gold) (2020, 2023)
Medal record
Men's Greco-Roman wrestling
Representing Bulgaria
World Championships
Silver medal – second place	2022 Belgrade	60 kg
European Championships
Gold medal – first place	2020 Rome	55 kg
Gold medal – first place	2023 Zagreb	60 kg
Silver medal – second place	2022 Budapest	60 kg
Bronze medal – third place	2024 Bucharest	63 kg
Grand Prix
Bronze medal – third place	2024 Zagreb	60 kg
European Junior Championships
Gold medal – first place	2022 Rome	63 kg
Bronze medal – third place	2021 Dortmund	60 kg
Summer Youth Olympics
Bronze medal – third place	2018 Buenos Aires	45 kg
World Cadets Championships
Bronze medal – third place	2019 Sofia	51 kg
Bronze medal – third place	2018 Zagreb	45 kg
European Cadets Championships
Gold medal – first place	2019 Faenza	51 kg
Gold medal – first place	2018 Skopje	45 kg

Edmond Armen Nazaryan (Bulgarian: Едмонд Армен Назарян, born 19 January 2002) is a Bulgarian Greco-Roman wrestler of Armenian descent. He won the silver medal in the 60 kg event at the 2022 World Wrestling Championships held in Belgrade, Serbia. Edmond is also a four-time medalist, including two gold medals, at the European Wrestling Championships.

== Career ==
In 2018, Nazaryan won the bronze medal in the boys' Greco-Roman 45 kg event at the Summer Youth Olympics held in Buenos Aires, Argentina. In the bronze medal match he defeated Arslanbek Zakirbayev of Turkmenistan.

He won the gold medal in the 55 kg event at the 2020 European Wrestling Championships held in Rome, Italy. He defeated Vitali Kabaloev of Russia in his gold medal match.

Nazaryan won the silver medal in the 60 kg event at the 2022 European Wrestling Championships held in Budapest, Hungary. He won the silver medal in the 60 kg event at the 2022 World Wrestling Championships held in Belgrade, Serbia.

Nazaryan won the gold medal in the 60 kg event at the 2023 European Wrestling Championships held in Zagreb, Croatia. He defeated Victor Ciobanu of Moldova in his gold medal match. Nazaryan won one of the bronze medals in the 63 kg event at the 2024 European Wrestling Championships held in Bucharest, Romania.

== Achievements ==
Year	Tournament	Location	Result	Event
2018	Summer Youth Olympics	Buenos Aires, Argentina	3rd	Greco-Roman 45 kg
2020	European Championships	Rome, Italy	1st	Greco-Roman 55 kg
2022	European Championships	Budapest, Hungary	2nd	Greco-Roman 60 kg
2022	World Championships	Belgrade, Serbia	2nd	Greco-Roman 60 kg
2023	European Championships	Zagreb, Croatia	1st	Greco-Roman 60 kg
2024	European Championships	Bucharest, Romania	3rd	Greco-Roman 63 kg

== Personal life ==
Armen Nazaryan is his father, a two-time Olympic Champion in Greco-Roman wrestling.
