= Georgij Tibilov (wrestler, born 2000) =

Russian-born Serbian Greco-Roman wrestler (born 2000)

Personal information
- Native name: Георгий Тибилов
- Full name: Georgij Tibilov
- Born: 25 April 2000 (age 26) Vladikavkaz
- Height: 1.71 m (5 ft 7 in)
- Weight: 64 kg (141 lb)

Sport
- Country: Russia (2016–2021); Serbia (2023–present)
- Sport: Amateur wrestling
- Event: Greco-Roman
Medal record
Men's Greco-Roman wrestling
Representing Serbia
World Championships
Bronze medal – third place	2023 Serbia	63 kg
European Championships
Silver medal – second place	2025 Bratislava	60 kg
Bronze medal – third place	2023 Zagreb	60 kg
Grand Prix
Gold medal – first place	2023 Warsaw	60 kg
Gold medal – first place	2025 Zagreb	60 kg
Bronze medal – third place	2024 Zagreb	63 kg
Bronze medal – third place	2025 Budapest	60 kg
Representing Russia
World Juniors Championships
Bronze medal – third place	2019 Tallinn	60 kg
European Cadets Championships
Gold medal – first place	2016 Stockholm	46 kg

Georgij Tibilov (born 25 April 2000) is a Russian-born Serbian wrestler who competes in Greco-Roman wrestling. He won a bronze medal at the 2023 European Wrestling Championships, in the 60 kg category. He competed in the 60 kg Greco-Roman wrestling category at the Paris Olympics.

== Sports career ==
In 2016, he became the winner of the championship of Russia and Europe in 2019 in Tallinn, he was the bronze medalist of the world championship among juniors in 60 kg. In February 2022, at the Russian Championship in Suzdal, at the 1/8 final stage, he defeated Albert Khakonov from Moscow, defeated Artur Petrosyan (Moscow-Tver Region) with a score of 3: 1 in the 1/4 finals, lost to Sergey Emelin from Mordovia in the semi-finals, and in the duel for the bronze award, he held a four-point throw and put on the carcass of Andrei Ivanov from Mordovia, the bronze medalist of the Spartakiad of the Strongest 2022, in October 2022 he became the champion of the Russian Cup.

He competed in the 60 kg event at the 2024 Summer Olympics held in Paris, France.

== Achievements ==
- Championship of Russia in wrestling among cadets 2016 (gold)
- European Championship in wrestling among cadets 2016 (gold)
- International Tournament in memory of Boris Gurevich 2016 (gold)
- International Tournament in memory of Boris Gurevich 2017 (gold)
- WORLD CUP JUNIORS (team classification) 2017 (bronze)
- International tournament in memory of Surakat Asiyatilov 2018 (gold)
- Championship of Russia in Greco-Roman wrestling juniors 2018 (silver)
- Championship of Russia in Greco-Roman wrestling juniors 2019 (silver)
- World Wrestling Championship U21 2019 (silver)
- Championship of Russia in Greco-Roman wrestling Juniors 2020 (bronze)
- Russian Championship among students 2020 (gold)
- Grand Prix Moscow ALROSA CUP 2020 (gold)
- Russian Championship among students 2021 (gold)
- International tournament Ion Cornianu & Ladislau Simon(ROMANIA)2021 (gold)
- Russian Greco-Roman Wrestling Championship 2021 U23-2
- International Tournament Città di Sassari di Lotta (ITALIA) 2021 (bronze)
- Russian Greco-Roman Wrestling Championship 2022 (silver)
- WRESTLING LEAGUE OF PODUBNY (PWL) 2022 (silver)
- Spartakiad of the Strongest Russia 2022 (silver)
- WRESTLING LEAGUE OF PODUBNY (PWL 2) 2022 (silver)
- CUP OF RUSSIA in Greco-Roman wrestling (individual) 2022 (silver)
