= Gevorg Gharibyan =

Armenian Greco-Roman wrestler

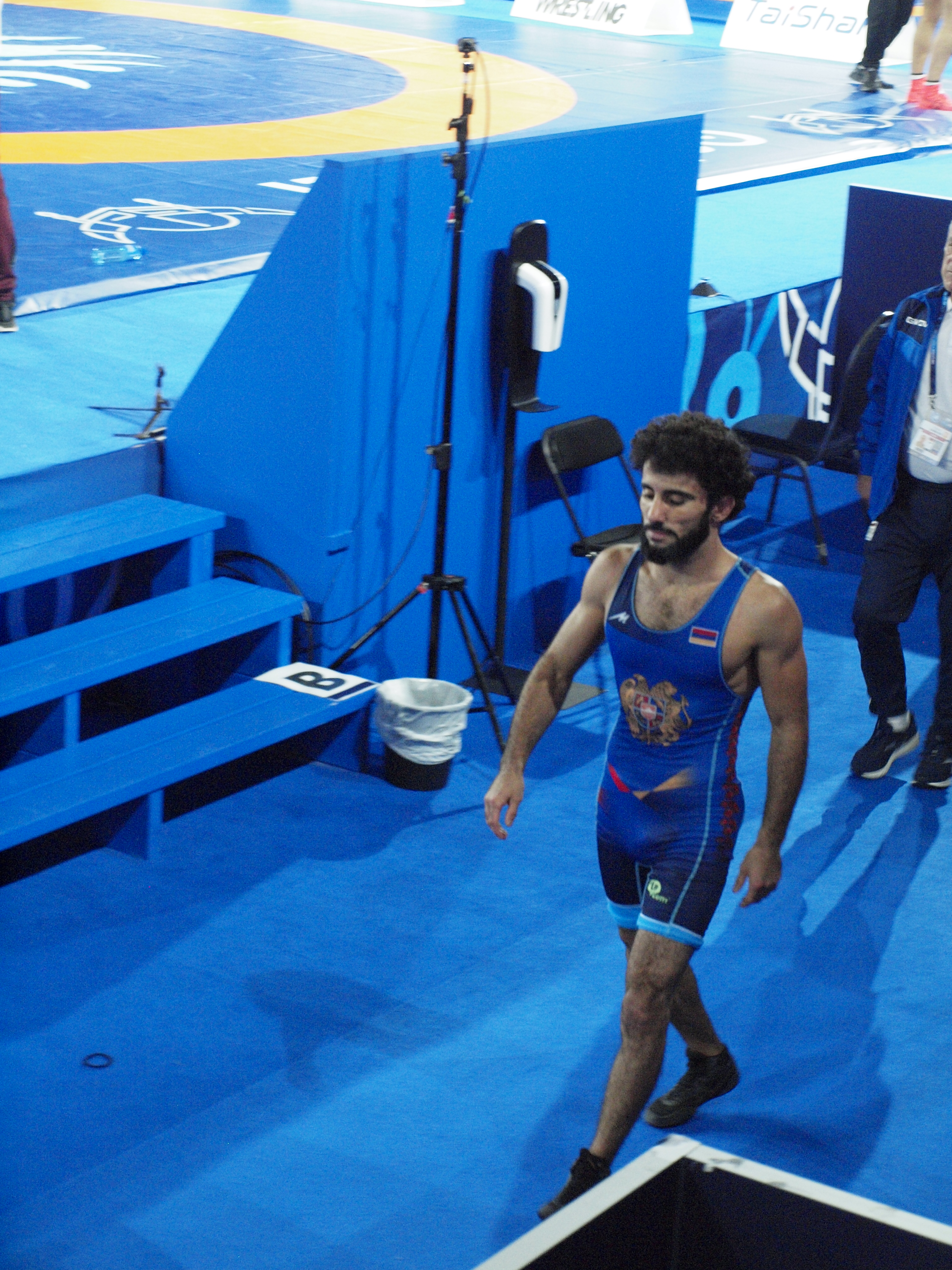
- Gevorg Gharibyan at the 2021 World Wrestling Championships in Oslo, Norway

Personal information
- Born: 11 December 1994 (age 31)
- Height: 164 cm (5 ft 5 in)

Sport
- Country: Armenia
- Sport: Amateur wrestling
- Weight class: 60 kg
- Event: Greco-Roman
Medal record
Men's Greco-Roman wrestling
Representing Armenia
European Championships
Gold medal – first place	2020 Rome	60 kg
Bronze medal – third place	2022 Budapest	60 kg
European Juniors Championships
Gold medal – first place	2012 Zagreb	55 kg
Gold medal – first place	2014 Warsaw	60 kg

Gevorg Gharibyan (born 11 December 1994) is an Armenian Greco-Roman wrestler. He won the gold medal in the 60 kg event at the 2020 European Wrestling Championships held in Rome, Italy.

== Career ==
Gharibyan won the gold medal in the 55 kg event at the 2012 European Juniors Wrestling Championships held in Zagreb, Croatia. He also won the gold medal in the 60 kg event at the 2014 European Juniors Wrestling Championships held in Warsaw, Poland.

In 2017, Gharibyan competed in the 59 kg event at the European Wrestling Championships held in Novi Sad, Serbia. The following year, he competed in the 60 kg event at the 2018 World Wrestling Championships held in Budapest, Hungary. In 2019, Gharibyan competed in the 60 kg event at the European Wrestling Championships held in Bucharest, Romania and in the 60 kg event at the World Wrestling Championships held in Nur-Sultan, Kazakhstan.

In 2020, Gharibyan won the gold medal in the 60 kg event at the European Wrestling Championships held in Rome, Italy. In the final, he defeated Kerem Kamal of Turkey. In the same year, he competed in the 63 kg event at the 2020 Individual Wrestling World Cup held in Belgrade, Serbia. In March 2021, Gharibyan competed at the European Qualification Tournament in Budapest, Hungary hoping to qualify for the 2020 Summer Olympics in Tokyo, Japan. He was eliminated in his second match. In October 2021, he lost his bronze medal match in the 60 kg event at the World Wrestling Championships held in Oslo, Norway.

Gharibyan won one of the bronze medals in the 60 kg event at the 2022 European Wrestling Championships held in Budapest, Hungary. He defeated Erik Torba of Hungary in his bronze medal match.

Gharibyan competed at the 2024 World Wrestling Olympic Qualification Tournament held in Istanbul, Turkey without qualifying for the 2024 Summer Olympics. He was eliminated in his first match.

== Achievements ==
Year	Tournament	Venue	Result	Event
2020	European Championships	Rome, Italy	1st	Greco-Roman 60 kg
2022	European Championships	Budapest, Hungary	3rd	Greco-Roman 60 kg
