= Helary Mägisalu =

Estonian wrestler (born 1997)

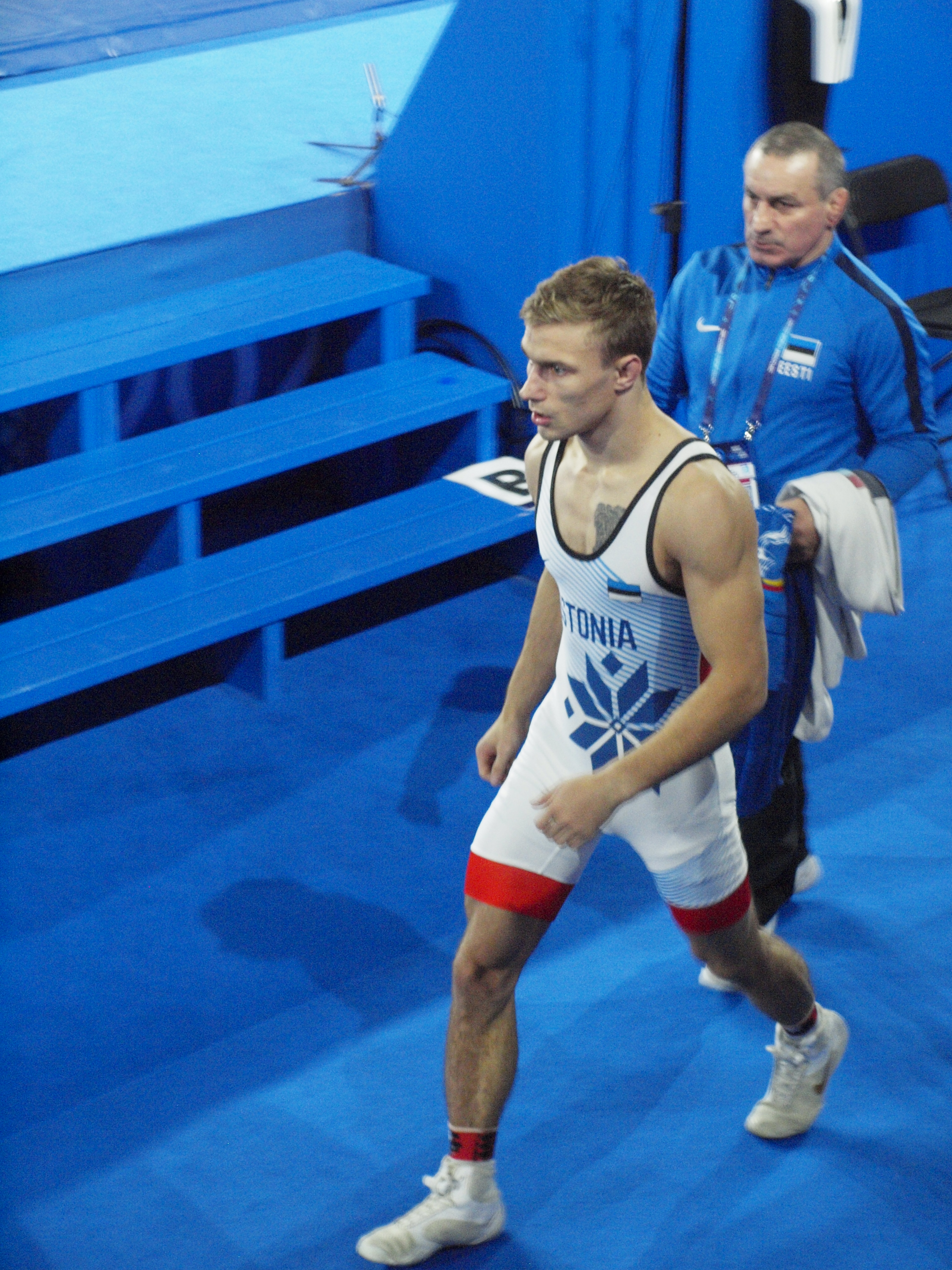
Helary Mägisalu (2021)

Helary Mägisalu (born 19 July 1997) is an Estonian wrestler.

He was born in Pärnu. In 2016 he graduated from Audentes Sports Gymnasium.

He started his wrestling exercising in 2005, coached by Karl Pajumäe. In 2018 he won a silver medal at the European Championships. He is 6-times (2016–2021) Estonian champion. Since 2014 he has been a member of Estonian national wrestling team.

In 2022, he lost his bronze medal match in his event at the Matteo Pellicone Ranking Series 2022 held in Rome, Italy.
