= 2019 World Wrestling Championships – Men's Greco-Roman 60 kg =

Men's Greco-Roman 60 kg at the 2019 World Championships
- Venue: Barys Arena
- Dates: 16–17 September 2019
- Competitors: 39 from 39 nations

Medalists
gold medal	Kenichiro Fumita	Japan
silver medal	Sergey Emelin	Russia
bronze medal	Meirambek Ainagulov	Kazakhstan
bronze medal	Alireza Nejati	Iran

The men's Greco-Roman 60 kilograms is a competition featured at the 2019 World Wrestling Championships, and was held in Nur-Sultan, Kazakhstan on 16 and 17 September.

== Results ==
Legend

- F — Won by fall
- WO — Won by walkover

=== Finals ===
Semifinals		Final
Sergey Emelin (RUS)	8
Meirambek Ainagulov (KAZ)	0	Sergey Emelin (RUS)	5
Kenichiro Fumita (JPN)	10	Kenichiro Fumita (JPN)	10
Alireza Nejati (IRI)	1

=== Top half ===
==== Section 1 ====
Round of 64

Round of 32
Sergey Emelin (RUS)	9
Erik Torba (HUN)	0
Michał Tracz (POL)	0
Răzvan Arnăut (ROU)	9
Etienne Kinsinger (GER)	1
Ildar Hafizov (USA)	6
Abdennour Laouni (ALG)	3
Lenur Temirov (UKR)	4^{F}

Round of 16
Sergey Emelin (RUS)	9
Răzvan Arnăut (ROU)	0
Ildar Hafizov (USA)	2
Lenur Temirov (UKR)	8

Quarterfinals
Sergey Emelin (RUS)	10
Lenur Temirov (UKR)	0

==== Section 2 ====
Round of 64

Round of 32
Meirambek Ainagulov (KAZ)	9
Marat Garipov (BRA)	0
Ardit Fazljija (SWE)	0
Justas Petravičius (LTU)	11
Enio Kertusha (ALB)	1
Jacopo Sandron (ITA)	5
Haydar Haydarov (TJK)	0
Ivan Lizatović (CRO)	9

Round of 16
Meirambek Ainagulov (KAZ)	4
Justas Petravičius (LTU)	2
Jacopo Sandron (ITA)	0
Ivan Lizatović (CRO)	8

Quarterfinals
Meirambek Ainagulov (KAZ)	10
Ivan Lizatović (CRO)	0

=== Bottom half ===
==== Section 3 ====
Round of 64

Round of 32
Victor Ciobanu (MDA)	6
Helary Mägisalu (EST)	1
Manish Kundu (IND)	11
Lauri Mähönen (FIN)	3
Gevorg Gharibyan (ARM)	0
Elmurat Tasmuradov (UZB)	7
Kenichiro Fumita (JPN)	3
Andrés Montaño (ECU)	1

Round of 16
Victor Ciobanu (MDA)	10
Manish Kundu (IND)	0
Elmurat Tasmuradov (UZB)	1
Kenichiro Fumita (JPN)	9

Quarterfinals
Victor Ciobanu (MDA)	5
Kenichiro Fumita (JPN)	12

==== Section 4 ====
Round of 64
Ivo Angelov (BUL)	4
Taleh Mammadov (AZE)	0
Dato Chkhartishvili (GEO)	1
Ri Se-ung (PRK)	10
Stig-André Berge (NOR)	2
Walihan Sailike (CHN)	3
Kanybek Zholchubekov (KGZ)	15
Kerem Kamal (TUR)	7
Alireza Nejati (IRI)	9
Seýdylla Täzäýew (TKM)	0
Dicther Toro (COL)	4
Haithem Mahmoud (EGY)	6
Fouad Fajari (MAR)	1
Maksim Kazharski (BLR)	5

Round of 32
Ivo Angelov (BUL)	2
Ri Se-ung (PRK)	1
Walihan Sailike (CHN)	4
Kanybek Zholchubekov (KGZ)	3
Alireza Nejati (IRI)	3
Haithem Mahmoud (EGY)	1
Maksim Kazharski (BLR)	1
Kim Seung-hak (KOR)	6

Round of 16
Ivo Angelov (BUL)	4
Walihan Sailike (CHN)	0
Alireza Nejati (IRI)	7
Kim Seung-hak (KOR)	0

Quarterfinals
Ivo Angelov (BUL)	1
Alireza Nejati (IRI)	3

=== Repechage ===
Repechage round 2
Erik Torba (HUN)	0
Răzvan Arnăut (ROU)	5
Andrés Montaño (ECU)
Elmurat Tasmuradov (UZB)	WO

Repechage round 3
Răzvan Arnăut (ROU)	2
Lenur Temirov (UKR)	3
Elmurat Tasmuradov (UZB)	9
Victor Ciobanu (MDA)	0

Bronze medals
Lenur Temirov (UKR)	0
Meirambek Ainagulov (KAZ)	10
Elmurat Tasmuradov (UZB)	5
Alireza Nejati (IRI)	7
