= 2022 Bolat Turlykhanov Cup =

- Host city: Almaty, Kazakhstan
- Dates: 2-5 June 2022
- Stadium: Baluan Sholak Sports Palace

Champions
- Freestyle: Kazakhstan
- Greco-Roman: Iran
- Women: India

The 2022 Bolat Turlykhanov Cup is a wrestling event was held in Almaty, Kazakhstan between 2 and 5 June 2022. It was held as the second of the ranking series of United World Wrestling.

== Ranking Series ==
Ranking Series Calendar 2022:

- 1st Ranking Series: 24-27 February, Turkey, Istanbul ⇒ 2022 Yasar Dogu Tournament
  2022 Vehbi Emre & Hamit Kaplan Tournament
- 2nd Ranking Series: 2-5 June, Kazakhstan, Almaty ⇒ 2022 Bolat Turlykhanov Cup
- 3rd Ranking Series: 22-25 June, Italy, Rome ⇒ Matteo Pellicone Ranking Series 2022
- 4th Ranking Series: 14-17 July, Tunisia, Tunis ⇒ 2022 Tunis Ranking Series

== Competition schedule ==
All times are (UTC+6)

Date	Time	Event
2 June	10.30-14.30	Qualification rounds & repechage GR – 55-60-63-67-87-97-130 kg
2 June	18.00-20.30	Final matches and awarding ceremony: GR – 55-60-63-67-87-97-130 kg
3 June	10.30-14.30	Qualification rounds & repechage GR – 72-77-82kg & WW – 57-62-68-76 kg
3 June	18.00-20.30	Final matches and awarding ceremony: Finals GR – 72-77-82 kg & WW – 57-62-68-76 kg
4 June	10.30-14.30	Qualification rounds & repechage WW – 50-53-55-59-65-72 kg & FS – 97-125 kg
4 June	18.00-20.30	Final matches and awarding ceremony: Finals WW – 50-53-55-59-65-72 kg & FS – 97-125 kg
5 June	10.30-14.30	Qualification rounds & repechage FS – 57-61-65-70-74-79-86-92 kg
5 June	18.00-20.30	Final matches and awarding ceremony: Finals FS – 57-61-65-70-74-79-86-92 kg

== Medal table ==
Rank	Nation	Gold	Silver	Bronze	Total
1	Iran	7	5	2	14
2	India	6	1	5	12
3	Kazakhstan	4	12	12	28
4	Kyrgyzstan	4	1	5	10
5	Mongolia	3	2	4	9
6	Turkey	3	0	2	5
7	Slovakia	2	1	1	4
8	Uzbekistan	1	3	13	17
9	Azerbaijan	0	2	2	4
10	Georgia	0	2	0	2
11	Egypt	0	1	1	2
12	Tajikistan	0	0	1	1
Totals (12 entries)		30	30	48	108

== Team ranking ==
Rank	Men's freestyle		Men's Greco-Roman		Women's freestyle	
Rank	Team	Points	Team	Points	Team	Points
1	Kazakhstan	175	Iran	185	India	192
2	India	101	Kazakhstan	165	Kazakhstan	171
3	Iran	95	Uzbekistan	108	Uzbekistan	122
4	Kyrgyzstan	88	Turkey	100	Mongolia	95
5	Slovakia	85	Kyrgyzstan	92	Azerbaijan	70

== Medal overview ==
=== Men's freestyle ===
Event	Gold	Silver	Bronze
57 kg	Aman Sehrawat; India	Meirambek Kartbay; Kazakhstan	Merey Bazarbayev; Kazakhstan
61 kg	Bekbolot Myrzanazar Uulu; Kyrgyzstan	Zhassulan Taskul; Kazakhstan	Yeldos Mombekov; Kazakhstan
65 kg	Tömör-Ochiryn Tulga; Mongolia	Abbos Rakhmonov; Uzbekistan	Umidjon Jalolov; Uzbekistan
65 kg	Tömör-Ochiryn Tulga; Mongolia	Abbos Rakhmonov; Uzbekistan	Bajrang Punia; India
70 kg	Ernazar Akmataliev; Kyrgyzstan	Rodion Anchugin; Kazakhstan	Alibek Osmonov; Kyrgyzstan
70 kg	Ernazar Akmataliev; Kyrgyzstan	Rodion Anchugin; Kazakhstan	Zafarbek Otakhonov; Uzbekistan
74 kg	Tajmuraz Salkazanov; Slovakia	Bat-Erdeniin Byambadorj; Mongolia	Amr Reda Hussen; Egypt
74 kg	Tajmuraz Salkazanov; Slovakia	Bat-Erdeniin Byambadorj; Mongolia	Nurkozha Kaipanov; Kazakhstan
79 kg	Bolat Sakayev; Kazakhstan	Saiakbai Usupov; Kyrgyzstan	Daulet Yergesh; Kazakhstan
79 kg	Bolat Sakayev; Kazakhstan	Saiakbai Usupov; Kyrgyzstan	Achsarbek Gulajev; Slovakia
86 kg	Hassan Yazdani; Iran	Boris Makoev; Slovakia	Bobur Islomov; Uzbekistan
86 kg	Hassan Yazdani; Iran	Boris Makoev; Slovakia	Fatih Erdin; Turkey
92 kg	Kamran Ghasempour; Iran	Adilet Davlumbayev; Kazakhstan	Abdimanap Baigenzheyev; Kazakhstan
97 kg	Batyrbek Tsakulov; Slovakia	Amir Hossein Firouzpour; Iran	Akezhan Aitbekov; Kazakhstan
97 kg	Batyrbek Tsakulov; Slovakia	Amir Hossein Firouzpour; Iran	Magomed Ibragimov; Uzbekistan
125 kg	Amir Hossein Zare; Iran	Yusup Batirmurzaev; Kazakhstan	Mönkhtöriin Lkhagvagerel; Mongolia
125 kg	Amir Hossein Zare; Iran	Yusup Batirmurzaev; Kazakhstan	Mohit Grewal; India

=== Men's Greco-Roman ===
Event	Gold	Silver	Bronze
55 kg	Pouya Dadmarz; Iran	Marlan Mukashev; Kazakhstan	Jasurbek Ortikboev; Uzbekistan
55 kg	Pouya Dadmarz; Iran	Marlan Mukashev; Kazakhstan	Aslamdzhon Azizov; Tajikistan
60 kg	Alireza Nejati; Iran	Pouya Nasserpour; Iran	Mukhammadkodir Yusupov; Uzbekistan
60 kg	Alireza Nejati; Iran	Pouya Nasserpour; Iran	Yernur Fidakhmetov; Kazakhstan
63 kg	Kerem Kamal; Turkey	Bagylan Zhakansha; Kazakhstan	Zholaman Sharshenbekov; Kyrgyzstan
63 kg	Kerem Kamal; Turkey	Bagylan Zhakansha; Kazakhstan	Neeraj Chhikara; India
67 kg	Abror Atabaev; Uzbekistan	Joni Khetsuriani; Georgia	Sultan Assetuly; Kazakhstan
67 kg	Abror Atabaev; Uzbekistan	Joni Khetsuriani; Georgia	Madiyar Balykbayev; Kazakhstan
72 kg	Mohammad Reza Geraei; Iran	Meirzhan Shermakhanbet; Kazakhstan	Makhmud Bakhshilloev; Uzbekistan
77 kg	Kaharman Kissymetov; Kazakhstan	Demeu Zhadrayev; Kazakhstan	Mohammad Reza Mokhtari; Iran
77 kg	Kaharman Kissymetov; Kazakhstan	Demeu Zhadrayev; Kazakhstan	Renat Iliaz Uulu; Kyrgyzstan
82 kg	Akzhol Makhmudov; Kyrgyzstan	Pejman Poshtam; Iran	Kalidin Asykeev; Kyrgyzstan
82 kg	Akzhol Makhmudov; Kyrgyzstan	Pejman Poshtam; Iran	Burhan Akbudak; Turkey
87 kg	Ramin Taheri; Iran	Aivengo Rikadze; Georgia	Atabek Azisbekov; Kyrgyzstan
87 kg	Ramin Taheri; Iran	Aivengo Rikadze; Georgia	Jalgasbay Berdimuratov; Uzbekistan
97 kg	Metehan Başar; Turkey	Mahdi Fallah; Iran	Olzhas Syrlybay; Kazakhstan
97 kg	Metehan Başar; Turkey	Mahdi Fallah; Iran	Rustam Assakalov; Uzbekistan
130 kg	Osman Yıldırım; Turkey	Amin Mirzazadeh; Iran	Anton Savenko; Kazakhstan
130 kg	Osman Yıldırım; Turkey	Amin Mirzazadeh; Iran	Ali Akbar Yousefi; Iran

=== Women's freestyle ===
Event	Gold	Silver	Bronze
50 kg	Tsogt-Ochiryn Namuuntsetseg; Mongolia	Jasmina Immaeva; Uzbekistan	Turkan Nasirova; Azerbaijan
50 kg	Tsogt-Ochiryn Namuuntsetseg; Mongolia	Jasmina Immaeva; Uzbekistan	Dolgorjavyn Otgonjargal; Mongolia
53 kg	Bat-Ochiryn Bolortuyaa; Mongolia	Zhuldyz Eshimova; Kazakhstan	Aktenge Keunimjaeva; Uzbekistan
53 kg	Bat-Ochiryn Bolortuyaa; Mongolia	Zhuldyz Eshimova; Kazakhstan	Leyla Gurbanova; Azerbaijan
55 kg	Marina Sedneva; Kazakhstan	Shokhida Akhmedova; Uzbekistan	Sushma Shokeen; India
57 kg	Mansi Ahlawat; India	Emma Tissina; Kazakhstan	Laylokhon Sobirova; Uzbekistan
59 kg	Sarita Mor; India	Zhala Aliyeva; Azerbaijan	Diana Kayumova; Kazakhstan
62 kg	Sakshi Malik; India	Irina Kuznetsova; Kazakhstan	Enkhbatyn Gantuyaa; Mongolia
65 kg	Manisha Bhanwala; India	Elis Manolova; Azerbaijan	Ariukhan Jumabaeva; Uzbekistan
68 kg	Divya Kakran; India	Zorigtyn Bolortungalag; Mongolia	Enkhsaikhany Delgermaa; Mongolia
72 kg	Zhamila Bakbergenova; Kazakhstan	Bipasha Dahiya; India	Svetlana Oknazarova; Uzbekistan
76 kg	Aiperi Medet Kyzy; Kyrgyzstan	Samar Amer; Egypt	Pooja Sihag; India

== Participating nations ==
238 wrestlers from 14 countries:

1. Azerbaijan (6)
2. Brazil (1)
3. Egypt (2)
4. Georgia (11)
5. India (27)
6. Iran (16)
7. Kazakhstan (76) (Host)
8. Kyrgyzstan (21)
9. Mongolia (24)
10. Palestine (1)
11. Slovakia (5)
12. Tajikistan (9)
13. Turkey (9)
14. Uzbekistan (30)

== Results ==
=== Men's freestyle ===
==== Men's freestyle 57 kg ====
Legend

- F — Won by fall
- WO — Won by walkover

Pos	Athlete	Pld	W	L	CP	TP	IND	KAZ	KAZ	KAZ	KGZ
1	Aman Sehrawat (IND)	4	4	0	15	35	—	15–12	10–9	WO	10–0
2	Meirambek Kartbay (KAZ)	4	3	1	14	15	1–3 VPO1	—	3–0	WO	WO
3	Merey Bazarbayev (KAZ)	4	2	2	10	19	1–3 VPO1	0–3 VPO	—	WO	10–0
4	Zhakhongir Akhmajanov (KAZ)	4	1	3	3	7	0–5 VIN	0–5 VIN	0–5 VIN	—	7–0
5	Abdymalik Karachov (KGZ)	4	0	4	0	0	0–4 VSU	0–5 VIN	0–4 VSU	0–3 VPO	—

Source: UWW

==== Men's freestyle 61 kg ====
Legend

- F — Won by fall

Pos	Athlete	Pld	W	L	CP	TP	KAZ	PLE	KAZ
1	Zhassulan Taskul (KAZ)	2	2	0	8	2	—	2–1	WO
2	Ali Aburumaila (PLE)	2	1	1	6	1	1–3 VPO1	—	WO
3	Assylzhan Yessengeldi (KAZ)	2	0	2	0	0	0–5 VIN	0–5 VIN	—

Source: UWW

Pos	Athlete	Pld	W	L	CP	TP	KGZ	KAZ	TJK
1	Bekbolot Myrzanazar Uulu (KGZ)	2	2	0	9	22	—	9–2 Fall	13–2
2	Yeldos Mombekov (KAZ)	2	1	1	3	8	0–5 VFA	—	6–2
3	Shamsiddin Ibodov (TJK)	2	0	2	2	4	1–4 VSU1	1–3 VPO1	—

Source: UWW

Semifinals
Zhassulan Taskul (KAZ)	9
Yeldos Mombekov (KAZ)	1
Bekbolot Myrzanazar Uulu (KGZ)	10
Ali Aburumaila (PLE)	0

Finals
Zhassulan Taskul (KAZ)	0
Bekbolot Myrzanazar Uulu (KGZ)	11
Bronze medal match
Yeldos Mombekov (KAZ)	3
Ali Aburumaila (PLE)	0

==== Men's freestyle 65 kg ====
Legend

- F — Won by fall

1/8 finals
Ulukbek Zholdoshbekov (KGZ)	1
Umidjon Jalolov (UZB)	11

Quarterfinals
Sanzhar Mukhtar (KAZ)	0
Umidjon Jalolov (UZB)	11
Tömör-Ochiryn Tulga (MGL)	11
Komron Kholov (TJK)	0
Abbos Rakhmonov (UZB)	5
Bajrang Punia (IND)	3
Rifat Saibotalov (KAZ)	8
Auyez Seitbayev (KAZ)	7

Semifinals
Umidjon Jalolov (UZB)	1
Tömör-Ochiryn Tulga (MGL)	5
Abbos Rakhmonov (UZB)	6
Rifat Saibotalov (KAZ)	2

Final
Tömör-Ochiryn Tulga (MGL)	9
Abbos Rakhmonov (UZB)	1

Bronze medal match
Komron Kholov (TJK)	0
Umidjon Jalolov (UZB)	12
Bajrang Punia (IND)	7
Rifat Saibotalov (KAZ)	0

==== Men's freestyle 70 kg ====
Legend

- F — Won by fall

1/8 finals
Amandyk Bakeyev (KAZ)	2
Meirzhan Ashirov (KAZ)	12

Quarterfinals
Ernazar Akmataliev (KGZ)	5
Meirzhan Ashirov (KAZ)	3
Selahattin Kılıçsallayan (TUR)	2
Alibek Osmonov (KGZ)	4
Muboraksho Qurbonbekov (TJK)	3
Vishal Kaliramana (IND)	10
Zafarbek Otakhonov (UZB)	7
Rodion Anchugin (KAZ)	10

Semifinals
Ernazar Akmataliev (KGZ)	2^{F}
Alibek Osmonov (KGZ)	0
Vishal Kaliramana (IND)	4
Rodion Anchugin (KAZ)	8

Final
Ernazar Akmataliev (KGZ)	10^{F}
Rodion Anchugin (KAZ)	7

Bronze medal match
Meirzhan Ashirov (KAZ)	9
Alibek Osmonov (KGZ)	11
Zafarbek Otakhonov (UZB)	8
Vishal Kaliramana (IND)	6

==== Men's freestyle 74 kg ====
Legend

- F — Won by fall

1/8 finals
Kanat Mussabekov (KAZ)	10
Islambek Orozbekov (KGZ)	0
Nurlan Bekzhanov (KAZ)	8
Asomiddin Hasanov (UZB)	4

Quarterfinals
Naveen Malik (IND)	8
Kanat Mussabekov (KAZ)	3
Amr Reda Hussen (EGY)	8
Bat-Erdeniin Byambadorj (MGL)	10^{F}
Tajmuraz Salkazanov (SVK)	3
Ikhtiyor Navruzov (UZB)	0
Nurlan Bekzhanov (KAZ)	0
Nurkozha Kaipanov (KAZ)	10

Semifinals
Naveen Malik (IND)	6
Bat-Erdeniin Byambadorj (MGL)	7
Tajmuraz Salkazanov (SVK)	3
Nurkozha Kaipanov (KAZ)	1

Final
Bat-Erdeniin Byambadorj (MGL)	0
Tajmuraz Salkazanov (SVK)	8

Bronze medal match
Amr Reda Hussen (EGY)	5
Naveen Malik (IND)	1
Ikhtiyor Navruzov (UZB)	9
Nurkozha Kaipanov (KAZ)	17

==== Men's freestyle 79 kg ====
Legend

- F — Won by fall

Quarterfinals		Semifinals		Final
Arsalan Budazhapov (KGZ)	3
Saiakbai Usupov (KGZ)	12	Saiakbai Usupov (KGZ)	8
Gourav Baliyan (IND)	5	Daulet Yergesh (KAZ)	1
Daulet Yergesh (KAZ)	17			Saiakbai Usupov (KGZ)	1
Bolat Sakayev (KAZ)	5^{F}			Bolat Sakayev (KAZ)	2
Zhiger Zakirov (KAZ)	2	Bolat Sakayev (KAZ)	4
Jakub Sýkora (SVK)	2	Achsarbek Gulajev (SVK)	0
Achsarbek Gulajev (SVK)	12

Bronze medal match
Arsalan Budazhapov (KGZ)	4
Daulet Yergesh (KAZ)	4
Zhiger Zakirov (KAZ)	6
Achsarbek Gulajev (SVK)	6

==== Men's freestyle 86 kg ====
Legend

- F — Won by fall

Quarterfinals		Semifinals		Final
Nurzhan Issagaliyev (KAZ)	0
Boris Makoev (SVK)	11	Boris Makoev (SVK)	6
Abylaikhan Nursultanov (KAZ)	5	Bobur Islomov (UZB)	1
Bobur Islomov (UZB)	10			Boris Makoev (SVK)	0
Bekzod Abdurakhmonov (UZB)	0			Hassan Yazdani (IRI)	11
Azamat Dauletbekov (KAZ)	8	Azamat Dauletbekov (KAZ)	1
Fatih Erdin (TUR)	0	Hassan Yazdani (IRI)	12
Hassan Yazdani (IRI)	12

Bronze medal match
Nurzhan Issagaliyev (KAZ)	2
Bobur Islomov (UZB)	13
Fatih Erdin (TUR)	4
Azamat Dauletbekov (KAZ)	2

==== Men's freestyle 92 kg ====
Legend

- F — Won by fall

Pos	Athlete	Pld	W	L	CP	TP	IRI	KAZ	IND
1	Kamran Ghasempour (IRI)	2	2	0	9	20	—	10–0 Fall	10–0
2	Islyambek Ilyassov (KAZ)	2	1	1	3	6	0–5 VFA	—	6–5
3	Vicky Chahar (IND)	2	0	2	2	5	0–4 VSU	1–3 VPO1	—

Source: UWW

Pos	Athlete	Pld	W	L	CP	TP	KAZ	KAZ	IND
1	Adilet Davlumbayev (KAZ)	2	2	0	9	22	—	7–0	WO
2	Abdimanap Baigenzheyev (KAZ)	2	1	1	3	8	0–3 VPO	—	WO
3	Deepak Punia (IND)	2	0	2	2	4	0–5 VIN	0–5 VIN	—

Source: UWW

Semifinals
Kamran Ghasempour (IRI)	11
Abdimanap Baigenzheyev (KAZ)	0
Adilet Davlumbayev (KAZ)	12
Islyambek Ilyassov (KAZ)	1

Finals
Kamran Ghasempour (IRI)	11
Adilet Davlumbayev (KAZ)	0
Bronze medal match
Abdimanap Baigenzheyev (KAZ)	4
Islyambek Ilyassov (KAZ)	2

==== Men's freestyle 97 kg ====
Legend

- F — Won by fall

1/8 finals
Yunus Gafurov (KAZ)	5
Mukhammadrasul Rakhimov (UZB)	6

Quarterfinals
Bekzat Urkimbay (KAZ)	0
Mukhammadrasul Rakhimov (UZB)	11
Amir Hossein Firouzpour (IRI)	8
Akezhan Aitbekov (KAZ)	3
Magomed Ibragimov (UZB)	11
Deepak Nehra (IND)	6
Batyrbek Tsakulov (SVK)	10
Faizi Faizzoda (TJK)	0

Semifinals
Mukhammadrasul Rakhimov (UZB)	4
Amir Hossein Firouzpour (IRI)	15
Magomed Ibragimov (UZB)	1
Batyrbek Tsakulov (SVK)	10^{F}

Final
Amir Hossein Firouzpour (IRI)	0
Batyrbek Tsakulov (SVK)	10

Bronze medal match
Akezhan Aitbekov (KAZ)	4
Mukhammadrasul Rakhimov (UZB)	3
Faizi Faizzoda (TJK)	0
Magomed Ibragimov (UZB)	10

==== Men's freestyle 125 kg ====
Legend

- F — Won by fall

Quarterfinals		Semifinals		Final
Amir Hossein Zare (IRI)	9
Oleg Boltin (KAZ)	7	Amir Hossein Zare (IRI)	3
Mönkhtöriin Lkhagvagerel (MGL)	3	Mönkhtöriin Lkhagvagerel (MGL)	0
Alisher Yergali (KAZ)	2			Amir Hossein Zare (IRI)	21
Mohit Grewal (IND)	6			Yusup Batirmurzaev (KAZ)	10
Salim Ercan (TUR)	1	Mohit Grewal (IND)	0
Sardorbek Kholmatov (UZB)	0	Yusup Batirmurzaev (KAZ)	10
Yusup Batirmurzaev (KAZ)	10

Bronze medal match
Oleg Boltin (KAZ)	2
Mönkhtöriin Lkhagvagerel (MGL)	2
Sardorbek Kholmatov (UZB)	2
Mohit Grewal (IND)	8

=== Men's Greco-Roman ===
==== Men's Greco-Roman 55 kg ====
Legend

- F — Won by fall
- WO — Won by walkover

1/8 finals
Giorgi Tokhadze (GEO)	1
Marlan Mukashev (KAZ)	8

Quarterfinals
~~Mönkh-Erdeniin Davaabandi (MGL)~~
Marlan Mukashev (KAZ)	WO
Alpamys Dastanbek (KAZ)	3
Jasurbek Ortikboev (UZB)	5
Khorlan Zhakansha (KAZ)	7
Arjun Halakurki (IND)	11
Pouya Dadmarz (IRI)	7
Aslamdzhon Azizov (TJK)	2

Semifinals
Marlan Mukashev (KAZ)	2^{F}
Jasurbek Ortikboev (UZB)	2
Arjun Halakurki (IND)	0
Pouya Dadmarz (IRI)	8

Final
Marlan Mukashev (KAZ)	2
Pouya Dadmarz (IRI)	4

Repechage round 1
Giorgi Tokhadze (GEO)	WO
~~Mönkh-Erdeniin Davaabandi (MGL)~~

Bronze medal match
Giorgi Tokhadze (GEO)	5
Jasurbek Ortikboev (UZB)	14
Aslamdzhon Azizov (TJK)	13
Arjun Halakurki (IND)	4

==== Men's Greco-Roman 60 kg ====
Legend

- F — Won by fall

1/8 finals
Marat Garipov (BRA)	3
Mukhammadkodir Yusupov (UZB)	5
Kuttubek Abdykerim Uulu (KGZ)	3
Firuz Mirzoradzhabov (TJK)	6^{F}
Gyanender Dahiya (IND)	2
Yernur Fidakhmetov (KAZ)	3^{F}

Quarterfinals
Amangali Bekbolatov (KAZ)	1
Mukhammadkodir Yusupov (UZB)	10
Ilkhom Bakhromov (UZB)	0
Alireza Nejati (IRI)	9
Pouya Nasserpour (IRI)	10
Firuz Mirzoradzhabov (TJK)	0
Yernur Fidakhmetov (KAZ)	10
Yernar Fidakhmetov (KAZ)	1

Semifinals
Mukhammadkodir Yusupov (UZB)	0
Alireza Nejati (IRI)	9
Pouya Nasserpour (IRI)	9
Yernur Fidakhmetov (KAZ)	4

Final
Alireza Nejati (IRI)	9
Pouya Nasserpour (IRI)	0

Bronze medal match
Ilkhom Bakhromov (UZB)	1
Mukhammadkodir Yusupov (UZB)	2^{F}
Firuz Mirzoradzhabov (TJK)	2
Yernur Fidakhmetov (KAZ)	4

==== Men's Greco-Roman 63 kg ====
Legend

- F — Won by fall
- WO — Won by walkover

1/8 finals
Dastan Kadyrov (KGZ)	1
Meirambek Ainagulov (KAZ)	3
Beka Guruli (GEO)	4
Bagylan Zhakansha (KAZ)	9

Quarterfinals
Galym Kabdunassarov (KAZ)	1
Meirambek Ainagulov (KAZ)	9
Kerem Kamal (TUR)	9
Zholaman Sharshenbekov (KGZ)	3
Kerim Machalikashvili (GEO)	3
Ahmet Uyar (TUR)	4
Bagylan Zhakansha (KAZ)	6^{F}
Neeraj Chhikara (IND)	3

Semifinals
Meirambek Ainagulov (KAZ)	3
Kerem Kamal (TUR)	6
Ahmet Uyar (TUR)	2
Bagylan Zhakansha (KAZ)	4

Final
Kerem Kamal (TUR)	11
Bagylan Zhakansha (KAZ)	0

Repechage round 1
Beka Guruli (GEO)	0
Neeraj Chhikara (IND)	9

Bronze medal match
Zholaman Sharshenbekov (KGZ)	WO
Meirambek Ainagulov (KAZ)
Neeraj Chhikara (IND)	4^{F}
Ahmet Uyar (TUR)	2

==== Men's Greco-Roman 67 kg ====
Legend

- F — Won by fall

1/8 finals
Kaly Sulaimanov (KGZ)	1
Daniyar Kalenov (KAZ)	1
Khalmurat Ibragimov (KGZ)	10
Sachin Sahrawat (IND)	1

Quarterfinals
Meysam Dalkhani (IRI)	8
Kaly Sulaimanov (KGZ)	0
Sultan Assetuly (KAZ)	0
Abror Atabaev (UZB)	9
Joni Khetsuriani (GEO)	3
Madiyar Balykbayev (KAZ)	1
Khalmurat Ibragimov (KGZ)	2
Amantur Ismailov (KGZ)	10

Semifinals
Meysam Dalkhani (IRI)	3^{R}
Abror Atabaev (UZB)	3
Joni Khetsuriani (GEO)	4
Amantur Ismailov (KGZ)	0

Final
Abror Atabaev (UZB)	4^{F}
Joni Khetsuriani (GEO)	0

Bronze medal match
Sultan Assetuly (KAZ)	WO
Meysam Dalkhani (IRI)
Madiyar Balykbayev (KAZ)	9
Amantur Ismailov (KGZ)	6

==== Men's Greco-Roman 72 kg ====
Legend

- F — Won by fall
- WO — Won by walkover

Pos	Athlete	Pld	W	L	CP	TP	KAZ	IRI	KAZ	TJK
1	Meirzhan Shermakhanbet (KAZ)	3	3	0	11	14	—	7–3	7–1	WO
2	Mohammad Reza Geraei (IRI)	3	2	1	11	7	1–3 VPO1	—	4–3 Fall	WO
3	Azat Sadykov (KAZ)	3	1	2	6	4	1–3 VPO1	0–5 VFA	—	WO
—	Sheroz Ochilov (TJK)	3	0	3	0	0	0–5 VFO	0–5 VFO	0–5 VFO	—

Source: UWW

Pos	Athlete	Pld	W	L	CP	TP	UZB	UZB	KAZ
1	Makhmud Bakhshilloev (UZB)	2	2	0	6	10	—	3–1	7–1
2	Jamol Jumabaev (UZB)	2	1	1	5	10	1–3 VPO1	—	9–0
3	Abylaikhan Amzeyev (KAZ)	2	0	2	1	1	1–3 VPO1	0–4 VSU	—

Source: UWW

Semifinals
Meirzhan Shermakhanbet (KAZ)	8
Jamol Jumabaev (UZB)	0
Makhmud Bakhshilloev (UZB)	0
Mohammad Reza Geraei (IRI)	9

Finals
Meirzhan Shermakhanbet (KAZ)
Mohammad Reza Geraei (IRI)	WO
Bronze medal match
Jamol Jumabaev (UZB)	1
Makhmud Bakhshilloev (UZB)	1

==== Men's Greco-Roman 77 kg ====
Legend

- F — Won by fall

1/8 finals
Mohammad Reza Mokhtari (IRI)	3
Dilshod Omongeldiyev (UZB)	1

Quarterfinals
Tamerlan Shadukayev (KAZ)	2
Mohammad Reza Mokhtari (IRI)	6
Demeu Zhadrayev (KAZ)	2
Yunus Emre Başar (TUR)	1
Renat Iliaz Uulu (KGZ)	1
Kaharman Kissymetov (KAZ)	1
Habibjon Zuhurov (TJK)	0
Khvicha Ananidze (GEO)	8

Semifinals
Mohammad Reza Mokhtari (IRI)	2
Demeu Zhadrayev (KAZ)	5
Kaharman Kissymetov (KAZ)	10
Khvicha Ananidze (GEO)	3

Final
Demeu Zhadrayev (KAZ)	4
Kaharman Kissymetov (KAZ)	5

Bronze medal match
Yunus Emre Başar (TUR)	1
Mohammad Reza Mokhtari (IRI)	3
Renat Iliaz Uulu (KGZ)	9
Khvicha Ananidze (GEO)	0

==== Men's Greco-Roman 82 kg ====
Legend

- F — Won by fall

1/8 finals
Kalidin Asykeev (KGZ)	2
Mukhammadkodir Rasulov (UZB)	0
Miras Barshylykov (KAZ)	3
Harpreet Singh Sandhu (IND)	6^{F}

Quarterfinals
Pejman Poshtam (IRI)	4
Kalidin Asykeev (KGZ)	4
Shamil Batyrov (KAZ)	5
Sukhrob Abdulkhaev (TJK)	2
Burhan Akbudak (TUR)	5
Akzhol Makhmudov (KGZ)	5
Harpreet Singh Sandhu (IND)	1
Tornike Dzamashvili (GEO)	5

Semifinals
Pejman Poshtam (IRI)	10
Shamil Batyrov (KAZ)	1
Akzhol Makhmudov (KGZ)	4
Tornike Dzamashvili (GEO)	1

Final
Pejman Poshtam (IRI)	0
Akzhol Makhmudov (KGZ)	9

Bronze medal match
Kalidin Asykeev (KGZ)	3
Shamil Batyrov (KAZ)	1
Burhan Akbudak (TUR)	8
Tornike Dzamashvili (GEO)	0

==== Men's Greco-Roman 87 kg ====
Legend

- F — Won by fall

1/8 finals
Gurami Khetsuriani (GEO)	4
Sunil Kumar (IND)	0
Melis Aitbekov (KGZ)	3
Ali Sharifi (IRI)	5
Aivengo Rikadze (GEO)	9
Baurzhan Mussin (KAZ)	0

Quarterfinals
Azamat Kustubayev (KAZ)	2
Gurami Khetsuriani (GEO)	0
Ramin Taheri (IRI)	3
Atabek Azisbekov (KGZ)	1
Jalgasbay Berdimuratov (UZB)	9
Ali Sharifi (IRI)	0
Aivengo Rikadze (GEO)	5
Nursultan Tursynov (KAZ)	0

Semifinals
Azamat Kustubayev (KAZ)	1
Ramin Taheri (IRI)	3
Jalgasbay Berdimuratov (UZB)	1
Aivengo Rikadze (GEO)	9

Final
Ramin Taheri (IRI)	2
Aivengo Rikadze (GEO)	1

Repechage round 1
Baurzhan Mussin (KAZ)	0
Nursultan Tursynov (KAZ)	6

Bronze medal match
Atabek Azisbekov (KGZ)	6
Azamat Kustubayev (KAZ)	5
Nursultan Tursynov (KAZ)	1
Jalgasbay Berdimuratov (UZB)	3

==== Men's Greco-Roman 97 kg ====
Legend

- F — Won by fall

1/8 finals
Olzhas Syrlybay (KAZ)	1
Metehan Başar (TUR)	2

Quarterfinals
Deepanshu Ahlawat (IND)	1
Metehan Başar (TUR)	1
Beksultan Makhmudov (KGZ)	6
Aleksi Lodia (GEO)	3
Rustam Assakalov (UZB)	1
Yersaiyn Saifulla (KAZ)	0^{R}
Umalt Daudov (KAZ)	1
Mahdi Fallah (IRI)	4

Semifinals
Metehan Başar (TUR)	3
Beksultan Makhmudov (KGZ)	1
Rustam Assakalov (UZB)	1
Mahdi Fallahh (IRI)	3

Final
Metehan Başar (TUR)	2^{F}
Mahdi Fallah (IRI)	1

Repechage round 1
Olzhas Syrlybay (KAZ)	10^{F}
Deepanshu Ahlawat (IND)	4

Bronze medal match
Olzhas Syrlybay (KAZ)	7
Beksultan Makhmudov (KGZ)	4
Umalt Daudov (KAZ)	2
Rustam Assakalov (UZB)	10

==== Men's Greco-Roman 130 kg ====
Legend

- C — Won by 3 cautions given to the opponent
- F — Won by fall

1/8 finals
Anton Savenko (KAZ)	0
Osman Yıldırım (TUR)	5

Quarterfinals
Sulkhan Buidze (GEO)	0
Osman Yıldırım (TUR)	3
Alimkhan Syzdykov (KAZ)	5^{F}
Mansur Shadukayev (KAZ)	10
Iakob Kajaia (GEO)	0
Ali Akbar Yousefi (IRI)	8
Satish Antil (IND)	0
Amin Mirzazadeh (IRI)	9

Semifinals
Osman Yıldırım (TUR)	3
Alimkhan Syzdykov (KAZ)	1
Ali Akbar Yousefi (IRI)	2
Amin Mirzazadeh (IRI)	2

Final
Osman Yıldırım (TUR)	3
Amin Mirzazadeh (IRI)	2

Repechage round 1
Anton Savenko (KAZ)	4^{F}
Sulkhan Buidze (GEO)	0

Bronze medal match
Anton Savenko (KAZ)	6
Alimkhan Syzdykov (KAZ)	1
Satish Antil (IND)	0
Ali Akbar Yousefi (IRI)	9^{C}

=== Women's freestyle ===
==== Women's freestyle 50 kg ====
Legend

- F — Won by fall

Quarterfinals		Semifinals		Final
Turkan Nasirova (AZE)	0
Tsogt-Ochiryn Namuuntsetseg (MGL)	5^{F}	Tsogt-Ochiryn Namuuntsetseg (MGL)	10
Shahana Nazarova (AZE)	1	Aigul Nuralim (KAZ)	0
Aigul Nuralim (KAZ)	5			Tsogt-Ochiryn Namuuntsetseg (MGL)	10^{F}
Svetlana Ankicheva (KAZ)	0			Jasmina Immaeva (UZB)	0
Jasmina Immaeva (UZB)	7	Jasmina Immaeva (UZB)	6
Neelam Sirohi (IND)	2	Dolgorjavyn Otgonjargal (MGL)	6
Dolgorjavyn Otgonjargal (MGL)	3

Bronze medal match
Turkan Nasirova (AZE)	5
Aigul Nuralim (KAZ)	4
Svetlana Ankicheva (KAZ)	4
Dolgorjavyn Otgonjargal (MGL)	8

==== Women's freestyle 53 kg ====
Legend

- F — Won by fall

1/8 finals
Aktenge Keunimjaeva (UZB)	8^{F}
Tatyana Varansova (AZE)	0
Aisha Ualishan (KAZ)	WO
~~Nandintsetsegiin Anudari (MGL)~~

Quarterfinals
Dilshoda Matnazarova (UZB)	0
Aktenge Keunimjaeva (UZB)	5^{F}
Zhuldyz Eshimova (KAZ)	WO
~~Enkhboldyn Buman-Ayuush (MGL)~~
Leyla Gurbanova (AZE)	7
Pooja Gehlot (IND)	2
Aisha Ualishan (KAZ)	0
Bat-Ochiryn Bolortuyaa (MGL)	4^{F}

Semifinals
Aktenge Keunimjaeva (UZB)	2
Zhuldyz Eshimova (KAZ)	5
Leyla Gurbanova (AZE)	4
Bat-Ochiryn Bolortuyaa (MGL)	11^{F}

Final
Zhuldyz Eshimova (KAZ)
Bat-Ochiryn Bolortuyaa (MGL)	WO

Bronze medal match
~~Enkhboldyn Buman-Ayuush (MGL)~~
Aktenge Keunimjaeva (UZB)	WO
Aisha Ualishan (KAZ)	0
Leyla Gurbanova (AZE)	8^{F}

==== Women's freestyle 55 kg ====
Legend

- F — Won by fall
- WO — Won by walkover

Pos	Athlete	Pld	W	L	CP	TP	KAZ	UZB	KAZ
1	Marina Sedneva (KAZ)	2	2	0	7	22	—	12–9	10–0
2	Shokhida Akhmedova (UZB)	2	1	1	4	12	1–3 VPO1	—	3–0
3	Assylzat Sagymbay (KAZ)	2	0	2	0	0	0–4 VSU	0–3 VPO	—

Source: UWW

Pos	Athlete	Pld	W	L	CP	TP	KAZ	KAZ	IND
1	Sushma Shokeen (IND)	2	2	0	8	10	—	10–8	WO
2	Ainur Ashimova (KAZ)	2	1	1	6	8	1–3 VPO1	—	WO
—	Khishigsuren Batbold (MGL)	2	0	2	0	0	0–5 VFO	0–5 VFO	—

Source: UWW

Semifinals
Marina Sedneva (KAZ)	7
Ainur Ashimova (KAZ)	3
Sushma Shokeen (IND)	0
Shokhida Akhmedova (UZB)	9^{F}

Finals
Marina Sedneva (KAZ)	4
Shokhida Akhmedova (UZB)	3
Bronze medal match
Ainur Ashimova (KAZ)	0
Sushma Shokeen (IND)	6^{F}

==== Women's freestyle 57 kg ====
Legend

- F — Won by fall

Pos	Athlete	Pld	W	L	CP	TP	UZB	KAZ	MGL
1	Laylokhon Sobirova (UZB)	2	2	0	7	18	—	8–8	10–0
2	Laura Almaganbetova (KAZ)	2	1	1	4	11	1–3 VPO1	—	3–2
3	Khürelkhüügiin Bolortuyaa (MGL)	2	0	2	1	2	0–4 VSU	1–3 VPO1	—

Source: UWW

Pos	Athlete	Pld	W	L	CP	TP	IND	KAZ	MGL
1	Mansi Ahlawat (IND)	2	2	0	8	6	—	6–0	WO
2	Emma Tissina (KAZ)	2	1	1	5	8	0–3 VPO	—	WO
—	Erdenechimegiin Sumiyaa (MGL)	2	0	2	0	0	0–5 VFO	0–5 VFO	—

Source: UWW

Semifinals
Laylokhon Sobirova (UZB)	3
Emma Tissina (KAZ)	10^{F}
Mansi Ahlawat (IND)	10^{F}
Laura Almaganbetova (KAZ)	0

Finals
Emma Tissina (KAZ)	0
Mansi Ahlawat (IND)	3
Bronze medal match
Laylokhon Sobirova (UZB)	13
Laura Almaganbetova (KAZ)	5

==== Women's freestyle 59 kg ====
Legend

- F — Won by fall
- WO — Won by walkover

Pos	Athlete	Pld	W	L	CP	TP	AZE	KAZ	UZB	MGL
1	Zhala Aliyeva (AZE)	3	3	0	13	20	—	6–4	14–2 Fall	WO
2	Aizhan Ismagulova (KAZ)	3	2	1	9	14	1–3 VPO1	—	1–3 VPO1	WO
3	Dilfuza Aimbetova (UZB)	3	1	2	6	3	0–5 VFA	10–1	—	WO
—	Tsogzolmaa Dorjsuren (MGL)	3	0	3	0	0	0–5 VFO	0–5 VFO	0–5 VFO	—

Source: UWW

Pos	Athlete	Pld	W	L	CP	TP	IND	KAZ	MGL
1	Sarita Mor (IND)	2	2	0	9	11	—	11–0	WO
2	Diana Kayumova (KAZ)	2	1	1	5	0	0–4 VSU	—	WO
—	Baatarjavyn Shoovdor (MGL)	2	0	2	0	0	0–5 VFO	0–5 VFO	—

Source: UWW

Semifinals
Zhala Aliyeva (AZE)	8
Diana Kayumova (KAZ)	6
Sarita Mor (IND)	12
Aizhan Ismagulova (KAZ)	2

Finals
Zhala Aliyeva (AZE)	0
Sarita Mor (IND)	10
Bronze medal match
Diana Kayumova (KAZ)	11
Aizhan Ismagulova (KAZ)	3

==== Women's freestyle 62 kg ====
Legend

- F — Won by fall
- WO — Won by walkover

Pos	Athlete	Pld	W	L	CP	TP	IND	KAZ	UZB
1	Sakshi Malik (IND)	2	2	0	7	19	—	10–0	9–3
2	Irina Kuznetsova (KAZ)	2	1	1	4	11	0–4 VSU	—	
3	Rushana Abdirasulova (UZB)	2	0	2	2	4	1–3 VPO1		—

Source: UWW

Pos	Athlete	Pld	W	L	CP	TP	MGL	MGL	MGL
1	Enkhbatyn Gantuyaa (MGL)	2	2	0	10	0	—	WO	WO
—	Sükheegiin Tserenchimed (MGL)	2	0	2	0	0	0–5 VFO	—	
—	Boldsaikhan Khongorzul (MGL)	2	0	2	0	0	0–5 VFO	0–0 2VFO	—

Source: UWW

Semifinals
Sakshi Malik (IND)	WO
~~Sükheegiin Tserenchimed (MGL)~~
Enkhbatyn Gantuyaa (MGL)	4
Irina Kuznetsova (KAZ)	6^{F}

Finals
Sakshi Malik (IND)	7^{F}
Irina Kuznetsova (KAZ)	4
Bronze medal match
~~Sükheegiin Tserenchimed (MGL)~~
Enkhbatyn Gantuyaa (MGL)	WO

==== Women's freestyle 65 kg ====
Legend

- F — Won by fall
- WO — Won by walkover

Pos	Athlete	Pld	W	L	CP	TP	AZE	IND	KAZ	UZB
1	Elis Manolova (AZE)	3	3	0	11	23	—	11–0	1–1	11–0
2	Manisha Bhanwala (IND)	3	2	1	8	19	0–4 VSU	—	8–4	11–0 Fall
3	Yelena Shalygina (KAZ)	3	1	2	7	9	1–3 VPO1	1–3 VPO1	—	4–0 Fall
4	Dinora Rustamova (UZB)	3	0	3	0	0	0–4 VSU	0–5 VFA	0–5 VFA	—

Source: UWW

Pos	Athlete	Pld	W	L	CP	TP	CAN	TUR	TUN
1	Ariukhan Jumabaeva (UZB)	2	2	0	8	20	—	7–0	WO
2	Gaukhar Mukatay (KAZ)	2	1	1	3	1	0–3 VPO	—	WO
—	Ölziisaikhany Pürevsüren (MGL)	2	0	2	0	0	0–5 VFO	0–5 VFO	—

Source: UWW

Semifinals
Elis Manolova (AZE)	9
Gaukhar Mukatay (KAZ)	1
Ariukhan Jumabaeva (UZB)	0
Manisha Bhanwala (IND)}	10

Finals
Elis Manolova (AZE)	0
Manisha Bhanwala (IND)	8
Bronze medal match
Gaukhar Mukatay (KAZ)	3
Ariukhan Jumabaeva (UZB)	5^{F}

==== Women's freestyle 68 kg ====
Legend

- F — Won by fall

Pos	Athlete	Pld	W	L	CP	TP	IND	MGL	MGL	KAZ
1	Divya Kakran (IND)	3	2	1	11	16	—	10–14	2–1 Fall	4–0 Fall
2	Zorigtyn Bolortungalag (MGL)	3	2	1	9	26	3–1 VPO1	—	7–3	9–0 Fall
3	Enkhsaikhany Delgermaa (MGL)	3	2	1	7	19	0–5 VFA	1–3 VPO1	—	11–0
4	Albina Kairgeldinova (KAZ)	3	0	3	0	0	0–5 VFA	0–5 VFA	1–3 VPO1	—

Source: UWW

==== Women's freestyle 72 kg ====
Legend

- F — Won by fall
- WO — Won by walkover

Pos	Athlete	Pld	W	L	CP	TP	KAZ	IND	UZB	MGL
1	Zhamila Bakbergenova (KAZ)	3	2	1	11	16	—	7–5	10–0	WO
2	Bipasha Dahiya (IND)	3	2	1	9	26	1–3 VPO1	—	11–6	WO
3	Svetlana Oknazarova (UZB)	3	2	1	7	19	0–4 VSU	1–3 VPO1	—	WO
—	Enkh-Amaryn Davaanasan (MGL)	3	0	3	1	6	0–5 VFO	0–5 VFO	0–5 VFO	—

Source: UWW

==== Women's freestyle 76 kg ====
Legend

- F — Won by fall

Pos	Athlete	Pld	W	L	CP	TP	AZE	IND	KAZ	UZB
1	Samar Amer (EGY)	3	3	0	14	14	—	10–0	4–0 Fall	WO
2	Pooja Sihag (IND)	3	2	1	10	10	0–4 VSU	—	10–3 Fall	WO
3	Inkara Zhanatayeva (KAZ)	3	1	2	5	3	0–5 VFA	0–5 VFA	—	WO
—	Gan-Ochiryn Urtnasan (MGL)	3	0	3	0	0	0–5 VFO	0–5 VFO	0–5 VFO	—

Source: UWW

Pos	Athlete	Pld	W	L	CP	TP	CAN	TUR	TUN
1	Aiperi Medet Kyzy (KGZ)	2	2	0	10	0	—	WO	WO
—	Naigalsürengiin Zagardulam (MGL)	2	0	2	0	0	0–5 VFO	—	
—	Ganbatyn Ariunjargal (MGL)	2	0	2	0	0	0–5 VFO	0–0 2VFO	—

Source: UWW

Semifinals
Samar Amer (EGY)	WO
~~Naigalsürengiin Zagardulam (MGL)~~
Aiperi Medet Kyzy (KGZ)	10
Pooja Sihag (IND)	0

Finals
Samar Amer (EGY)	6
Aiperi Medet Kyzy (KGZ)	17
Bronze medal match
~~Naigalsürengiin Zagardulam (MGL)~~
Pooja Sihag (IND)	WO
