= 2022 Wrestling World Cup – Men's Greco-Roman =

Men's Greco-Roman at the 2022 Wrestling World Cup
- Venue: Baku Sports Hall
- Location: Baku, Azerbaijan
- Dates: 5–6 November
- Competitors: 74
- Teams: 6

Medalists
gold medal	Iran
silver medal	Azerbaijan
bronze medal	All-World Team

The 2022 Wrestling World Cup - Men's Greco-Roman was held in Baku, Azerbaijan at the Baku Sports Palace On 5 to November 6, 2022.

The Greco-Roman World Cup has featured an All-World team for the first time ever. Serbia forfeited the tournament after a number of COVID-19 infections in the team. Azerbaijan and the All-World team will receive automatic wins.

== Pool stage ==
Teams qualified for the 1st place match
Teams qualified for the 3rd place match

=== Pool A ===
Pos	Team	Pld	W	L	CP	TP
1	Iran	2	2	0	55	105
2	Turkey	2	1	1	43	80
3	Kyrgyzstan	2	0	2	26	55

Source: UWW

POOL A
Round I

Turkey 4 – 6 Iran
Weight	Turkey	result	Iran
55 kg	Ekrem Öztürk	1 – 1	Pouya Dadmarz
60 kg	Kerem Kamal	7 – 9	Mehdi Mohsennejad
63 kg	Ahmet Uyar	0 – 8	Iman Mohammadi
67 kg	Murat Fırat	0 – 8	Danial Sohrabi
72 kg	Selçuk Can	1 – 2	Mohammad Reza Rostami
77 kg	Yunus Emre Başar	6 – 2	Mohammad Reza Mokhtari
82 kg	Burhan Akbudak	7 – 5	Alireza Mohmadi
87 kg	Ali Cengiz	11 – 2	Hamidreza Badkan
97 kg	Metehan Başar	2 – 4	Mehdi Bali
130 kg	Osman Yıldırım	5 – 5	Ali Akbar Yousefi

Round II

Iran 8 – 2 Kyrgyzstan
Weight	Iran	result	Kyrgyzstan
55 kg	Pouya Dadmarz	9 – 1	Taalaibek Beishenbek Uulu
60 kg	Mehdi Mohsennejad	5 – 0	Nurmukhammet Abdullaev
63 kg	Iman Mohammadi	12 – 1	Kaly Sulaimanov
67 kg	Danial Sohrabi	10 – 2	Khalmurat Ibragimov
72 kg	Amir Abdi	6 – 0	Adilkhan Nurlanbekov
77 kg	Mohammad Reza Mokhtari	7 – 1	Akylbek Talantbekov
82 kg	Mohammad Hossein Mahmoodi	1 – 6	Kalidin Asykeev
87 kg	Abolfazl Choubani	2 – 9	Atabek Azisbekov
97 kg	Mehdi Bali	3 – 3	Uzur Dzhuzupbekov
130 kg	Ali Akbar Yousefi	4^{F} – 1	Erlan Manatbekov

Round III

Kyrgyzstan 3 – 7 Turkey
Weight	Kyrgyzstan	result	Turkey
55 kg	Taalaibek Beishenbek Uulu	8 – 0	Ekrem Öztürk
60 kg	Nurmukhammet Abdullaev	6 – 1	Mükremin Aktaş
63 kg	Kaly Sulaimanov	1 – 5	Ahmet Uyar
67 kg	Khalmurat Ibragimov	1 – 6	Murat Fırat
72 kg	Adilkhan Nurlanbekov	3 – 5	Selçuk Can
77 kg	Akylbek Talantbekov	5 – 5	Yüksel Sarıçiçek
82 kg	Kalidin Asykeev	0 – 9	Burhan Akbudak
87 kg	Atabek Azisbekov	6 – 1	Ali Cengiz
97 kg	Uzur Dzhuzupbekov	1 – 2	Metehan Başar
130 kg	Erlan Manatbekov	0 – 6^{F}	Fatih Bozkurt

=== Pool B ===
Pos	Team	Pld	W	L	CP	TP
1	Azerbaijan	2	2	0	72	32
2	All-World Team	2	1	1	69	27
–	~~Serbia~~	0	–	–	0	0

Source: UWW

POOL B
Round I

Azerbaijan 10 – 0 ~~Serbia~~
Weight	Azerbaijan	result	Serbia
55 kg	Eldaniz Azizli	WO –	by forfeit
60 kg	Murad Mammadov	WO –	by forfeit
63 kg	Taleh Mammadov	WO –	by forfeit
67 kg	Hasrat Jafarov	WO –	by forfeit
72 kg	Ulvu Ganizade	WO –	by forfeit
77 kg	Sanan Suleymanov	WO –	by forfeit
82 kg	Rafig Huseynov	WO –	by forfeit
87 kg	Lachin Valiyev	WO –	by forfeit
97 kg	Arif Niftullayev	WO –	by forfeit
130 kg	Sabah Shariati	WO –	by forfeit

Round II

~~Serbia~~ 0 – 10 All-World Team
Weight	Serbia	result	All-World Team
55 kg	by forfeit	– WO	Nugzari Tsurtsumia
60 kg	by forfeit	– WO	Aidos Sultangali
63 kg	by forfeit	– WO	Leri Abuladze
67 kg	by forfeit	– WO	Joni Khetsuriani
72 kg	by forfeit	– WO	Andrii Kulyk
77 kg	by forfeit	– WO	Zoltán Lévai
82 kg	by forfeit	– WO	Jalgasbay Berdimuratov
87 kg	by forfeit	– WO	Alex Bjurberg Kessidis
97 kg	by forfeit	– WO	Nikoloz Kakhelashvili
130 kg	by forfeit	– WO	Mantas Knystautas

Round III

All-World Team 5 – 5.df Azerbaijan
Weight	All-World Team	result	Azerbaijan
55 kg	Nugzari Tsurtsumia	0 – 9	Eldaniz Azizli
60 kg	Aidos Sultangali	4^{F} – 1	Murad Mammadov
63 kg	Leri Abuladze	1 – 1	Taleh Mammadov
67 kg	Joni Khetsuriani	0 – 5	Hasrat Jafarov
72 kg	Andrii Kulyk	7 – 1	Ulvu Ganizade
77 kg	Zoltán Lévai	1 – 8^{F}	Sanan Suleymanov
82 kg	Jalgasbay Berdimuratov	1 – 3	Rafig Huseynov
87 kg	Alex Bjurberg Kessidis	3 – 2	Murad Ahmadiyev
97 kg	Nikoloz Kakhelashvili	5 – 1	Arif Niftullayev
130 kg	Mantas Knystautas	5 – 1	Sabah Shariati

== Medal Matches ==
Medal Matches
First-Place Match

Iran 5.df – 5 Azerbaijan
Weight	Iran	result	Azerbaijan
55 kg	Pouya Dadmarz	1 – 4	Eldaniz Azizli
60 kg	Mehdi Mohsennejad	5 – 4	Nihat Mammadli
63 kg	Iman Mohammadi	8 – 0	Taleh Mammadov
67 kg	Danial Sohrabi	1 – 5	Hasrat Jafarov
72 kg	Mohammad Reza Rostami	3 – 4	Ulvu Ganizade
77 kg	Aref Habibollahi	1 – 7	Sanan Suleymanov
82 kg	Mohammad Hossein Mahmoodi	1 – 5	Rafig Huseynov
87 kg	Abolfazl Choubani	2 – 1	Murad Ahmadiyev
97 kg	Mehdi Bali	5 – 2	Arif Niftullayev
130 kg	Ali Akbar Yousefi	6 – 3	Beka Kandelaki

Third-Place Match

Turkey 5 – 5.df All-World Team
Weight	Turkey	result	All-World Team
55 kg	Muhammet Emin Çakır	7 – 10	Nugzari Tsurtsumia
60 kg	Mükremin Aktaş	1 – 7	Aidos Sultangali
63 kg	Ahmet Uyar	1 – 3	Leri Abuladze
67 kg	Murat Fırat	1 – 1	Joni Khetsuriani
72 kg	Selçuk Can	3 – 4^{F}	Andrii Kulyk
77 kg	Yunus Emre Başar	7 – 6	Zoltán Lévai
82 kg	Burhan Akbudak	8 – 5	Jalgasbay Berdimuratov
87 kg	Ali Cengiz	4 – 2	Alex Bjurberg Kessidis
97 kg	Metehan Başar	1 – 1	Nikoloz Kakhelashvili
130 kg	Fatih Bozkurt	4 – 1	Mantas Knystautas

== Final ranking ==
Team	Pld	W	L
Iran	3	0	0
Azerbaijan	3	2	1
All-World Team	3	2	1
Turkey	3	1	2
Kyrgyzstan	2	0	2
Serbia	—	—	—

== See also ==
- 2022 Wrestling World Cup - Men's freestyle
- 2022 Wrestling World Cup - Women's freestyle
