= Wrestling at the 2019 European Games – Men's Greco-Roman 60 kg =

Men's Greco-Roman 60 kg at the 2019 European Games
- Venue: Minsk Sports Palace
- Date: 28 June and 29 June
- Competitors: 16 from 16 nations

Medalists
gold medal	Stepan Maryanyan	Russia
silver medal	Erik Torba	Hungary
bronze medal	Victor Ciobanu	Moldova
bronze medal	Dato Chkhartishvili	Georgia

The Men's Greco-Roman 60 kilograms competition at the 2019 European Games in Minsk was held on 28 and 29 June 2019 at the Minsk Sports Palace.

== Schedule ==
All times are in FET (UTC+03:00)

Date	Time	Event
Friday, 28 June 2019	11:20	1/8 finals
Friday, 28 June 2019	12:40	Quarterfinals
Friday, 28 June 2019	18:00	Semifinals
Saturday, 29 June 2019	11:00	Repechage
Saturday, 29 June 2019	18:30	Finals

== Results ==
Legend

- F — Won by fall

=== Main bracket ===
1/8 finals
Zhora Abovian (UKR)	6
Ihar Drozd (BLR)	3
Ivo Angelov (BUL)	5
Christopher Krämer (GER)	3
Kerem Kamal (TUR)	4
Armen Melikyan (ARM)	0
Victor Ciobanu (MDA)	1
Stepan Maryanyan (RUS)	9
Răzvan Arnăut (ROU)	7
Helary Mägisalu (EST)	2
Ardit Fazljija (SWE)	0
Erik Torba (HUN)	9
Sakit Guliyev (AZE)	0
Ivan Lizatović (CRO)	4
Dato Chkhartishvili (GEO)	5
Jacopo Sandron (ITA)	0

Quarterfinals
Zhora Abovian (UKR)	4
Ivo Angelov (BUL)	1
Kerem Kamal (TUR)	2
Stepan Maryanyan (RUS)	5
Răzvan Arnăut (ROU)	1
Erik Torba (HUN)	5
Ivan Lizatović (CRO)	1
Dato Chkhartishvili (GEO)	8

Semifinals
Zhora Abovian (UKR)	0
Stepan Maryanyan (RUS)	9
Erik Torba (HUN)	6
Dato Chkhartishvili (GEO)	5

Final
Stepan Maryanyan (RUS)	9
Erik Torba (HUN)	0

=== Repechage ===
Repechage round 1
Victor Ciobanu (MDA)	10
Kerem Kamal (TUR)	9
Ardit Fazljija (SWE)	4
Răzvan Arnăut (ROU)	6

Bronze medals
Victor Ciobanu (MDA)	3
Zhora Abovian (UKR)	1
Răzvan Arnăut (ROU)	3
Dato Chkhartishvili (GEO)	3
