= 2023 European Wrestling Championships – Men's Greco-Roman 63 kg =

Wrestling competition

Men's Greco-Roman 63 kg at the 2023 European Wrestling Championships
- Venue: Arena Zagreb
- Location: Zagreb, Croatia
- Dates: 21-22 April
- Competitors: 13

Medalists
gold medal	Leri Abuladze	Georgia
silver medal	Taleh Mammadov	Azerbaijan
bronze medal	Abu Muslim Amaev	Bulgaria
bronze medal	Hrachya Poghosyan	Armenia

The Men's Greco-Roman 63 kg is a competition featured at the 2023 European Wrestling Championships, and will held in Zagreb, Croatia on April 21 and 22.

== Results ==
Legend

- F — Won by fall

Round of 16
Mehmet Çeker (TUR)	13
Perica Dimitrijević (SRB)	5
Alexander Bica (SWE)	5
Abu Muslim Amaev (BUL)	5^{F}
Oleksandr Hrushyn (UKR)	3
Aleksandrs Jurkjans (LAT)	5
Aker Al-Obaidi (AUT)	3
Ivan Lizatović (CRO)	6
Jacopo Sandron (ITA)	1
Krisztián Kecskeméti (HUN)	1

Quarterfinals
Leri Abuladze (GEO)	9
Mehmet Çeker (TUR)	1
Abu Muslim Amaev (BUL)	9
Aleksandrs Jurkjans (LAT)	4
Hrachya Poghosyan (ARM)	10
Ivan Lizatović (CRO)	1
Jacopo Sandron (ITA)	1
Taleh Mammadov (AZE)	4

Semifinals
Leri Abuladze (GEO)	11
Abu Muslim Amaev (BUL)	2
Hrachya Poghosyan (ARM)	1
Taleh Mammadov (AZE)	5

Final
Leri Abuladze (GEO)	5
Taleh Mammadov (AZE)	1

Bronze medal match
Mehmet Çeker (TUR)	2
Abu Muslim Amaev (BUL)	6
Jacopo Sandron (ITA)	1
Hrachya Poghosyan (ARM)	1

== Final standing ==
Rank	Athlete
1st place, gold medalist(s)	Leri Abuladze (GEO)
2nd place, silver medalist(s)	Taleh Mammadov (AZE)
3rd place, bronze medalist(s)	Abu Muslim Amaev (BUL)
3rd place, bronze medalist(s)	Hrachya Poghosyan (ARM)
5	Mehmet Çeker (TUR)
5	Jacopo Sandron (ITA)
7	Aleksandrs Jurkjans (LAT)
8	Ivan Lizatović (CRO)
9	Perica Dimitrijević (SRB)
10	Oleksandr Hrushyn (UKR)
11	Aker Al-Obaidi (AUT)
12	Krisztián Kecskeméti (HUN)
13	Alexander Bica (SWE)
