= 2018 European Wrestling Championships – Men's Greco-Roman 60 kg =

Wrestling Championship

The Men's Greco-Roman 60 kg is a competition featured at the 2018 European Wrestling Championships, was held in Kaspiysk, Russia on May 1 and May 2.

== Medalists ==
Gold	Sergey Emelin; Russia
Silver	Murad Mammadov; Azerbaijan
Bronze	Jacopo Sandron; Italy
Bronze	Dato Chkhartishvili; Georgia

== Results ==
Legend

- F — Won by fall

=== Main bracket ===
1/8 finals
Maksim Kazharski (BLR)	1
Elçin Ali (TUR)	1
Avgustin Spasov (BUL)	4
Jacopo Sandron (ITA)	5
Raphael Jaeger (AUT)	3
Andriy Martynyuk (UKR)	7
Etienne Kinsinger (GER)	0
Sergey Emelin (RUS)	9
Erik Torba (HUN)	5
Justas Petravičius (LTU)	4
Victor Ciobanu (MDA)	7
Armen Melikyan (ARM)	8
Michał Tracz (POL)	1
Dato Chkhartishvili (GEO)	10

Quarterfinals
Murad Mammadov (AZE)	3
Maksim Kazharski (BLR)	0
Jacopo Sandron (ITA)	4
Andriy Martynyuk (UKR)	0
Sergey Emelin (RUS)	8
Erik Torba (HUN)	0
Armen Melikyan (ARM)	4
Dato Chkhartishvili (GEO)	12

Semifinals
Murad Mammadov (AZE)	9
Jacopo Sandron (ITA)	0
Sergey Emelin (RUS)	9
Dato Chkhartishvili (GEO)	0

Final
Murad Mammadov (AZE)	5
Sergey Emelin (RUS)	6

=== Repechage ===
Repechage round 1
Etienne Kinsinger (GER)	8
Erik Torba (HUN)	0

Bronze medal match
Maksim Kazharski (BLR)	1
Jacopo Sandron (ITA)	8
Etienne Kinsinger (GER)	1
Dato Chkhartishvili (GEO)	1
