= Wrestling at the 2020 Summer Olympics – Men's Greco-Roman 60 kg =

Men's Greco-Roman 60 kg at the Games of the XXXII Olympiad
- Venue: Makuhari Messe
- Date: 1–2 August 2021
- Competitors: 16 from 16 nations

Medalists
1st place, gold medalist(s)		Luis Orta	Cuba
2nd place, silver medalist(s)		Kenichiro Fumita	Japan
3rd place, bronze medalist(s)		Walihan Sailike	China
3rd place, bronze medalist(s)		Sergey Emelin	ROC

The men's Greco-Roman 60 kilograms competition at the 2020 Summer Olympics in Tokyo, Japan, took place on 1–2 August 2021 at the Makuhari Messe in Mihama-ku.

This freestyle wrestling competition consists of a single-elimination tournament, with a repechage used to determine the winner of two bronze medals. The two finalists face off for gold and silver medals. Each wrestler who loses to one of the two finalists moves into the repechage, culminating in a pair of bronze medal matches featuring the semifinal losers each facing the remaining repechage opponent from their half of the bracket.

== Schedule ==
All times are Japan Standard Time (UTC+09:00)

Date	Time	Event
1 August 2021	11:00	Qualification rounds
1 August 2021	18:15	Semifinals
2 August 2021	11:00	Repechage
2 August 2021	19:30	Finals

== Results ==
=== Main bracket ===
1/8 finals
Kenichiro Fumita (JPN)	8
Abdelkarim Fergat (ALG)	0
Etienne Kinsinger (GER)	1
Walihan Sailike (CHN)	1
Lenur Temirov (UKR)	5
Elmurat Tasmuradov (UZB)	0
Armen Melikyan (ARM)	5
Alireza Nejati (IRI)	5
Kerem Kamal (TUR)	0
Victor Ciobanu (MDA)	8
Zholaman Sharshenbekov (KGZ)	8
Meirambek Ainagulov (KAZ)	0
Luis Orta (CUB)	5
Ildar Hafizov (USA)	0
Haithem Mahmoud (EGY)	6
Sergey Emelin (ROC)	7

1/4 finals
Kenichiro Fumita (JPN)	1
Walihan Sailike (CHN)	1
Lenur Temirov (UKR)	8
Armen Melikyan (ARM)	4
Victor Ciobanu (MDA)	9
Zholaman Sharshenbekov (KGZ)	0
Luis Orta (CUB)	4
Sergey Emelin (ROC)	3

Semifinals
Kenichiro Fumita (JPN)	5
Lenur Temirov (UKR)	1
Victor Ciobanu (MDA)	0
Luis Orta (CUB)	11

Final
Kenichiro Fumita (JPN)	1
Luis Orta (CUB)	5

=== Repechage ===
Repechage
Abdelkarim Fergat (ALG)	1
Walihan Sailike (CHN)	6
Ildar Hafizov (USA)	1
Sergey Emelin (ROC)	7

Bronze medal matches
Walihan Sailike (CHN)	1
Lenur Temirov (UKR)	1
Sergey Emelin (ROC)	12
Victor Ciobanu (MDA)	1

== Final standing ==
Rank	Athlete
1st place, gold medalist(s)	Luis Orta (CUB)
2nd place, silver medalist(s)	Kenichiro Fumita (JPN)
3rd place, bronze medalist(s)	Walihan Sailike (CHN)
3rd place, bronze medalist(s)	Sergey Emelin (ROC)
5	Lenur Temirov (UKR)
5	Victor Ciobanu (MDA)
7	Zholaman Sharshenbekov (KGZ)
8	Armen Melikyan (ARM)
9	Haithem Mahmoud (EGY)
10	Alireza Nejati (IRI)
11	Etienne Kinsinger (GER)
12	Ildar Hafizov (USA)
13	Abdelkarim Fergat (ALG)
14	Elmurat Tasmuradov (UZB)
15	Kerem Kamal (TUR)
16	Meirambek Ainagulov (KAZ)
