= 2021 U23 World Wrestling Championships – Men's Greco-Roman 63 kg =

Greco-Roman event at World Wrestling Championship

The men's Greco-Roman 63 kilograms is a competition featured at the 2021 U23 World Wrestling Championships, and was held in Belgrade, Serbia on 1 and 2 November.

== Medalists ==
Gold	Leri Abuladze (GEO)
Silver	Ahmet Uyar (TUR)
Bronze	Hrachya Poghosyan (ARM)
Bronze	Alireza Nejati (IRI)

== Results ==
Legend

- F — Won by fall
- WO — Won by walkover

=== Main bracket ===
Round of 16
Alexander Ginc (GER)	0
Hrachya Poghosyan (ARM)	9
Arslanbek Salimov (POL)	1
Ahmet Uyar (TUR)	10
David Stepanian (USA)	WO
~~Žolt Zonai (SRB)~~
Corneliu Rusu (MDA)	5
Hasan Mammadli (AZE)	3
Georgii Tibilov (RUS)	3
Kamol Kuziev (UZB)	1
Leri Abuladze (GEO)	5
Assaukhat Mukhamadiyev (KAZ)	1
Neeraj Chhikara (IND)	0
Alireza Nejati (IRI)	9
Oleksandr Hrushyn (UKR)	8
Antonio Ruiz (ECU)	0

Quarterfinals
Hrachya Poghosyan (ARM)	1
Ahmet Uyar (TUR)	5
David Stepanian (USA)	0
Corneliu Rusu (MDA)	2
Georgii Tibilov (RUS)	3
Leri Abuladze (GEO)	7
Alireza Nejati (IRI)	5
Oleksandr Hrushyn (UKR)	1

Semifinals
Ahmet Uyar (TUR)	8
Corneliu Rusu (MDA)	0
Leri Abuladze (GEO)	7
Alireza Nejati (IRI)	3

Final
Ahmet Uyar (TUR)	1
Leri Abuladze (GEO)	3

=== Repechage ===
Repechage round 1
Arslanbek Salimov (POL)	0
Hrachya Poghosyan (ARM)	9
Assaukhat Mukhamadiyev (KAZ)	0
Georgii Tibilov (RUS)	4

Bronze medals
Hrachya Poghosyan (ARM)	9
Corneliu Rusu (MDA)	0
Georgii Tibilov (RUS)	0
Alireza Nejati (IRI)	8
