= 2026 European Wrestling Championships – Men's Greco-Roman 63 kg =

Men's Greco-Roman 63 kg at the 2026 European Wrestling Championships
- Venue: Tirana Olympic Park
- Location: Tirana, Albania
- Dates: 20–21 April
- Competitors: 12 from 11 nations

Medalists
gold medal	Sergey Emelin
silver medal	Vitalie Eriomenco	Moldova
bronze medal	Kerem Kamal	Turkey
bronze medal	Karen Aslanyan	Armenia

The men's Greco-Roman 63 kilograms competition at the 2026 European Wrestling Championships was held from 20 to 21 April 2026 at the Tirana Olympic Park in Tirana, Albania.

== Results ==
Legend

- F — Won by fall

=== Main bracket ===
Round of 16
Tino Ojala (FIN)	1
Pridon Abuladze (GEO)	4
Maksym Liu (UKR)	0
Kerem Kamal (TUR)	10
Nikolay Vichev (BUL)	2
Mairbek Salimov (POL)	5
Răzvan Arnăut (ROU)	0
Karen Aslanyan (ARM)	9

Quarterfinals
Vitalie Eriomenco (MDA)	5
Pridon Abuladze (GEO)	0
Kerem Kamal (TUR)	8
Ziya Babashov (AZE)	0
Morten Thoresen (NOR)	0
Mairbek Salimov (POL)	8
Karen Aslanyan (ARM)	2
Sergey Emelin (UWW)	5

Semifinals
Vitalie Eriomenco (MDA)	6
Kerem Kamal (TUR)	5
Mairbek Salimov (POL)	0
Sergey Emelin (UWW)	9

Final
Vitalie Eriomenco (MDA)	0
Sergey Emelin (UWW)	9

=== Repechage ===
Bronze medal matches
Pridon Abuladze (GEO)	2
Kerem Kamal (TUR)	6
Karen Aslanyan (ARM)	11
Mairbek Salimov (POL)	0

== Final standing ==
Rank	Wrestler
1st place, gold medalist(s)	Sergey Emelin (UWW)
2nd place, silver medalist(s)	Vitalie Eriomenco (MDA)
3rd place, bronze medalist(s)	Kerem Kamal (TUR)
3rd place, bronze medalist(s)	Karen Aslanyan (ARM)
5	Pridon Abuladze (GEO)
5	Mairbek Salimov (POL)
7	Nikolay Vichev (BUL)
8	Tino Ojala (FIN)
9	Morten Thoresen (NOR)
10	Ziya Babashov (AZE)
11	Răzvan Arnăut (ROU)
12	Maksym Liu (UKR)
