= Alireza Nejati =

Iranian Greco-Roman wrestler

Personal information
- Full name: Alireza Ayat Ollah Nejati
- Born: 12 November 1998 (age 28) Gilan, Iran

Sport
- Country: Iran
- Sport: Greco-Roman wrestling
- Coached by: Mohammad Bana; Hassan Rangraz
Medal record
Men's Greco-Roman wrestling
Representing Iran
World Championships
Bronze medal – third place	2019 Nur-Sultan	60 kg
Bolat Turlykhanov Cup
Gold medal – first place	2022 Almaty	60 kg
World U23 Championships
Bronze medal – third place	2021 Belgrade	63 kg
World Junior Championships
Bronze medal – third place	2018 Ternava	63 kg

Alireza Nejati (Persian: علیرضا نجاتی; born 12 November 1998) is an Iranian Greco-Roman wrestler, born in Gilan. He represented Iran at the 2020 Summer Olympics in Tokyo, Japan, competing in the Men's Greco-Roman 60 kg event.
