= Oleksandr Hrushyn =

Ukrainian wrestler (born 1998)

Personal information
- Nationality: Ukraine
- Born: 19 June 1998 (age 28) Volnovakha, Ukraine
- Weight: 63 kg (139 lb)

Sport
- Sport: Amateur wrestling
- Event: Greco-Roman
Medal record
Men's Greco-Roman wrestling
Representing Ukraine
European Championships
Silver medal – second place	2024 Bucharest	63 kg
Bronze medal – third place	2022 Budapest	63 kg
Grand Prix
Gold medal – first place	2026 Nice	67 kg
Silver medal – second place	2025 Nice	67 kg
World U23 Championships
Bronze medal – third place	2018 Bucharest	63 kg
World Junior Championships
Silver medal – second place	2017 Tampere	60 kg
European Junior Championships
Gold medal – first place	2018 Rome	63 kg

Oleksandr Hrushyn (Ukrainian: Олександр Ігорович Грушин; born 19 June 1998 in Volnovakha) is a Ukrainian Greco-Roman wrestler. He is a two-time European Championships medalist.

== Personal life ==
He was born on 19 June 1998 in Volnovakha at the east of Ukraine. He studied at the Borys Grinchenko Kyiv Metropolitan University in physical culture department. He is married to Alina Hrushyna, World Championships bronze medalist and two-time European champion.

== Career ==
In 2015, Oleksandr became a world champion at the World Cadets Wrestling Championships in Sarajevo.

In the following year, he won a bronze medal at the European Junior Championships in Bucharest.

In 2017, Oleksandr won a silver medal at the 2017 World Junior Wrestling Championships. The next year he won a gold medal at the 2018 European Juniors Wrestling Championships and a bronze medal at the 2018 U23 World Wrestling Championships, held in Rome and Bucharest respectively.

In the following years, Oleksandr won a bronze medal at the 2022 European Wrestling Championships in Budapest, beating Etienne Kinsinger in the bronze medal match.

He then won a silver medal at the 2024 European Wrestling Championships in 63 kg event, losing Murad Mammadov from Azerbaijan in final match. During the medal ceremony, he refused for common photo with bronze medalist Anvar Allakhiarov from Russia, who represented Individual Neutral Athletes, due to the Russian invasion of Ukraine.

== Achievements ==
Year	Tournament	Venue	Result	Event
2015	World Cadet Championships	Sarajevo, Bosnia and Herzegovina	1st	Greco-Roman 54 kg
2016	European Junior Championships	Bucharest, Romania	3rd	Greco-Roman 60 kg
2016	World Junior Championships	Macon, France	5th	Greco-Roman 60 kg
2017	European U23 Championships	Szombathely, Hungary	7th	Greco-Roman 59 kg
2017	European Junior Championships	Dortmund, Germany	5th	Greco-Roman 60 kg
2017	World Junior Championships	Tampere, Finland	2nd	Greco-Roman 60 kg
2018	European U23 Championships	Istanbul, Turkey	7th	Greco-Roman 63 kg
2018	European Junior Championships	Rome, Italy	1st	Greco-Roman 63 kg
2018	World Junior Championships	Trnava, Slovakia	18th	Greco-Roman 63 kg
2018	World U23 Championships	Bucharest, Romania	3rd	Greco-Roman 63 kg
2019	European U23 Championships	Novi Sad, Serbia	5th	Greco-Roman 63 kg
2019	World Championships	Nur-Sultan, Kazakhstan	15th	Greco-Roman 63 kg
2019	World U23 Championships	Budapest, Hungary	10th	Greco-Roman 63 kg
2021	European Championships	Warsaw, Poland	10th	Greco-Roman 63 kg
2021	World U23 Championships	Belgrade, Serbia	7th	Greco-Roman 63 kg
2022	European Championships	Budapest, Hungary	3rd	Greco-Roman 63 kg
2022	World Championships	Belgrade, Serbia	30th	Greco-Roman 63 kg
2023	European Championships	Zagreb, Croatia	10th	Greco-Roman 63 kg
2023	World Championships	Belgrade, Serbia	7th	Greco-Roman 63 kg
2024	European Championships	Bucharest, Romania	2nd	Greco-Roman 63 kg
