= 2017 World Junior Wrestling Championships =

- Host city: Tampere, Finland
- Dates: 1–6 August 2017

Champions
- Freestyle: United States
- Greco-Roman: Iran
- Women: Japan

The 2017 World Junior Wrestling Championships were the 41st edition of the World Junior Wrestling Championships and were held in Tampere, Finland between 1 and 6 August 2017.

== Medal table ==
Rank	Nation	Gold	Silver	Bronze	Total
1	Russia	7	2	4	13
2	United States	5	4	4	13
3	Japan	4	1	2	7
4	Iran	3	2	3	8
5	Kyrgyzstan	1	3	2	6
6	Ukraine	1	2	1	4
7	Azerbaijan	1	1	5	7
8	Georgia	1	1	1	3
9	Turkey	1	0	4	5
10	Armenia	0	2	1	3
11	Cuba	0	2	0	2
12	China	0	1	2	3
12	Uzbekistan	0	1	2	3
14	Bulgaria	0	1	0	1
14	Moldova	0	1	0	1
16	India	0	0	3	3
16	Mongolia	0	0	3	3
18	Finland	0	0	2	2
18	Romania	0	0	2	2
20	Belarus	0	0	1	1
20	Chinese Taipei	0	0	1	1
20	Egypt	0	0	1	1
20	Germany	0	0	1	1
20	Norway	0	0	1	1
20	Poland	0	0	1	1
20	Sweden	0	0	1	1
Totals (26 entries)		24	24	48	96

== Team ranking ==
Rank	Men's freestyle		Men's Greco-Roman		Women's freestyle	
Rank	Team	Points	Team	Points	Team	Points
1	United States	68	Iran	58	Japan	63
2	Russia	67	Russia	53	Russia	44
3	Iran	49	Turkey	38	China	41
4	Turkey	36	United States	29	Ukraine	32
5	Azerbaijan	34	Kyrgyzstan	28	United States	29

== Medal summary ==
=== Men's freestyle ===
Event	Gold	Silver	Bronze
50 kg	(Azerbaijan) Shahin Mukhtarov	(Armenia) Karen Zurabyan	(Mongolia) Narmandakhyn Nasanbuyan
50 kg	(Azerbaijan) Shahin Mukhtarov	(Armenia) Karen Zurabyan	(Kyrgyzstan) Akbar Kenzhebek Uulu
55 kg	(United States) Daton Fix	(Russia) Ismail Gadzhiev	(Azerbaijan) Afgan Khashalov
55 kg	(United States) Daton Fix	(Russia) Ismail Gadzhiev	(Armenia) Arsen Harutyunyan
60 kg	(Russia) Abdula Akhmedov	(United States) Steven McKee	(Japan) Hiromu Sakaki
60 kg	(Russia) Abdula Akhmedov	(United States) Steven McKee	(Iran) Younes Emami
66 kg	(Russia) David Baev	(United States) Ryan Deakin	(Georgia (country)) Iveriko Julakidze
66 kg	(Russia) David Baev	(United States) Ryan Deakin	(Mongolia) Temuulen Enkhtuya
74 kg	(United States) Mark Hall	(Uzbekistan) Isa Shapiev	(Iran) Mohammad Mottaghinia
74 kg	(United States) Mark Hall	(Uzbekistan) Isa Shapiev	(India) Veer Dev Gulia
84 kg	(Russia) Artur Naifonov	(United States) Zahid Valencia	(Iran) Ahmad Bazri
84 kg	(Russia) Artur Naifonov	(United States) Zahid Valencia	(Azerbaijan) Gadzhimurad Magomedsaidov
96 kg	(Russia) Shamil Musaev	(Georgia (country)) Givi Matcharashvili	(United States) Kollin Moore
96 kg	(Russia) Shamil Musaev	(Georgia (country)) Givi Matcharashvili	(Turkey) İbrahim Çiftçi
120 kg	(United States) Gable Steveson	(Iran) Naeim Hassanzadeh	(Russia) Zaur Kozonov
120 kg	(United States) Gable Steveson	(Iran) Naeim Hassanzadeh	(Turkey) Feyzullah Aktürk

=== Men's Greco-Roman ===
Event	Gold	Silver	Bronze
50 kg	(Iran) Pouya Dadmarz	(United States) Cevion Severado	(Uzbekistan) Ilkhom Bakhromov
50 kg	(Iran) Pouya Dadmarz	(United States) Cevion Severado	(Japan) Kensuke Shimizu
55 kg	(Turkey) Kerem Kamal	(Kyrgyzstan) Zholaman Sharshenbekov	(Russia) Emin Sefershaev
55 kg	(Turkey) Kerem Kamal	(Kyrgyzstan) Zholaman Sharshenbekov	(Uzbekistan) Turabek Tirkashev
60 kg	(Iran) Keramat Abdevali	(Ukraine) Oleksandr Hrushyn	(Egypt) Hassan Mohamed
60 kg	(Iran) Keramat Abdevali	(Ukraine) Oleksandr Hrushyn	(Russia) Magomed Magomedov
66 kg	(Iran) Amin Kavianinejad	(Armenia) Malkhas Amoyan	(Azerbaijan) Namaz Rustamov
66 kg	(Iran) Amin Kavianinejad	(Armenia) Malkhas Amoyan	(Russia) Miakhdi Iakhiaev
74 kg	(United States) Kamal Bey	(Kyrgyzstan) Akzhol Makhmudov	(Azerbaijan) Nasir Hasanov
74 kg	(United States) Kamal Bey	(Kyrgyzstan) Akzhol Makhmudov	(India) Sajan Bhanwal
84 kg	(Russia) Aleksandr Komarov	(Iran) Arman Alizadeh	(Belarus) Mikita Klimovich
84 kg	(Russia) Aleksandr Komarov	(Iran) Arman Alizadeh	(Turkey) Salih Aydın
96 kg	(Ukraine) Vladen Kozliuk	(Russia) Artur Sargsian	(Finland) Arvi Savolainen
96 kg	(Ukraine) Vladen Kozliuk	(Russia) Artur Sargsian	(Germany) Jan Zirn
120 kg	(Georgia (country)) Zviadi Pataridze	(Kyrgyzstan) Roman Kim	(Iran) Amin Mirzazadeh
120 kg	(Georgia (country)) Zviadi Pataridze	(Kyrgyzstan) Roman Kim	(Finland) Konsta Mäenpää

=== Women's freestyle ===
Event	Gold	Silver	Bronze
44 kg	(Japan) Manami Ueno	(China) Yumei Chen	(Romania) Stefania Priceputu
44 kg	(Japan) Manami Ueno	(China) Yumei Chen	(United States) Oveionce Ray
48 kg	(Japan) Kika Kagata	(Azerbaijan) Turkan Nasirova	(Turkey) Zeynep Yetgil
48 kg	(Japan) Kika Kagata	(Azerbaijan) Turkan Nasirova	(Ukraine) Oksana Livach
51 kg	(Russia) Ksenia Nezgovorova	(Ukraine) Khrystyna Bereza	(China) Xuejiao Liao
51 kg	(Russia) Ksenia Nezgovorova	(Ukraine) Khrystyna Bereza	(Mongolia) Bolor Orshikh
55 kg	(Japan) Sae Nanjō	(Cuba) Lianna Montero	(Russia) Viktoriia Vaulina
55 kg	(Japan) Sae Nanjō	(Cuba) Lianna Montero	(Azerbaijan) Leyla Gurbanova
59 kg	(Japan) Yuzuru Kumano	(Moldova) Anastasia Nichita	(Norway) Grace Bullen
59 kg	(Japan) Yuzuru Kumano	(Moldova) Anastasia Nichita	(India) Manju Kumari
63 kg	(United States) Maya Nelson	(Bulgaria) Yuliana Yaneva	(Poland) Aleksandra Wołczyńska
63 kg	(United States) Maya Nelson	(Bulgaria) Yuliana Yaneva	(China) Ying Zhang
67 kg	(Russia) Khanum Velieva	(Cuba) Yudaris Sánchez	(Romania) Alexandra Anghel
67 kg	(Russia) Khanum Velieva	(Cuba) Yudaris Sánchez	(Kyrgyzstan) Meerim Zhumanazarova
72 kg	(Kyrgyzstan) Aiperi Medet Kyzy	(Japan) Yasuha Matsuyuki	(Chinese Taipei) Hui Tsz Chang
72 kg	(Kyrgyzstan) Aiperi Medet Kyzy	(Japan) Yasuha Matsuyuki	(Sweden) Denise Stroem
