= Leri Abuladze =

Georgian Greco-Roman wrestler

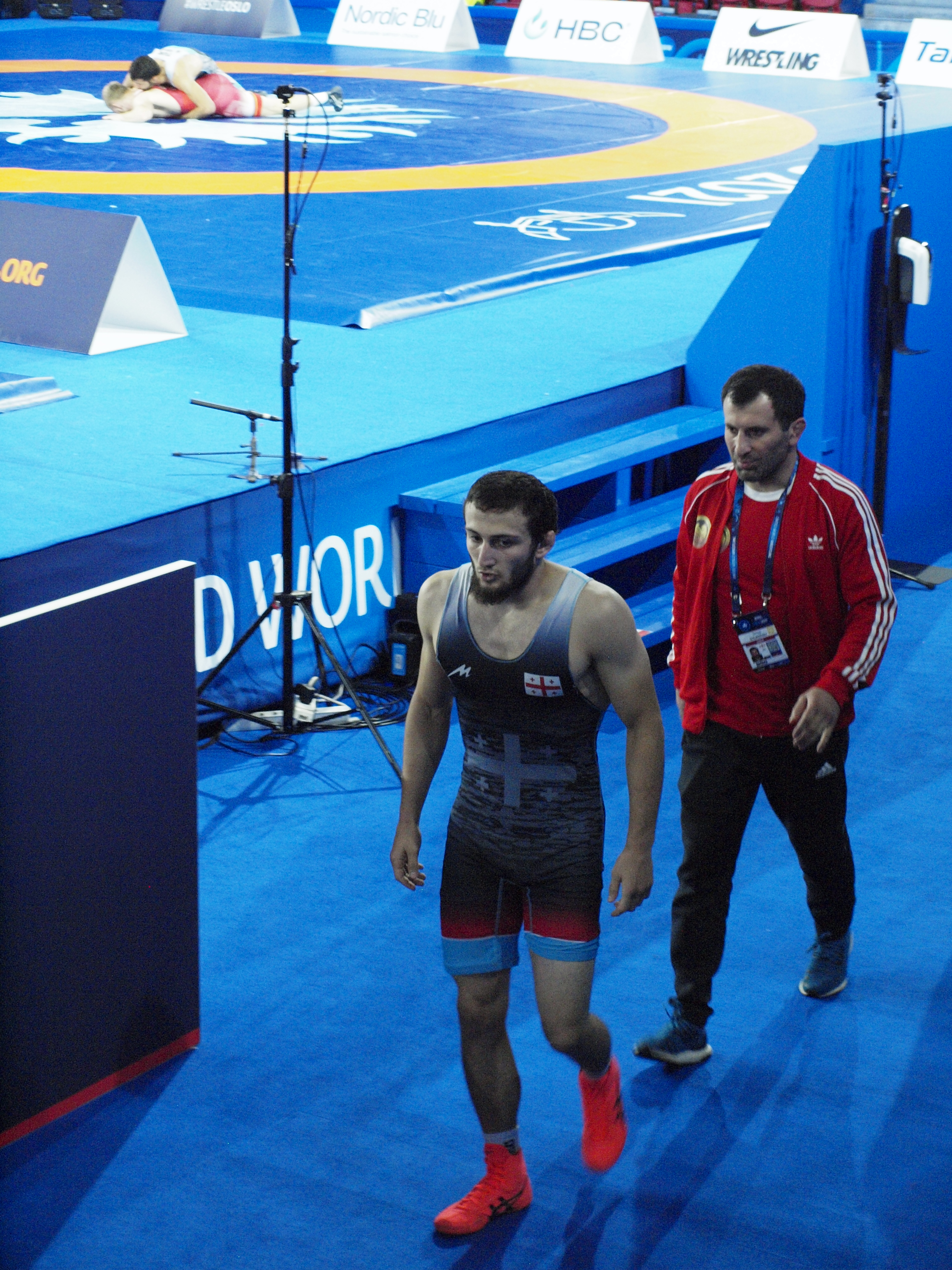

Personal information
- Native name: ლერი აბულაძე
- Born: 19 January 1999 (age 27) Khulo, Georgia

Sport
- Country: Georgia
- Sport: Amateur wrestling
- Weight class: 63 kg
- Event: Greco-Roman
Medal record
Men's Greco-Roman wrestling
Representing Georgia
World Championships
Gold medal – first place	2023 Belgrade	63 kg
Silver medal – second place	2021 Oslo	63 kg
Silver medal – second place	2022 Belgrade	63 kg
European Championships
Gold medal – first place	2022 Budapest	63 kg
Gold medal – first place	2023 Zagreb	63 kg
Bronze medal – third place	2021 Warsaw	63 kg
Grand Prix
Gold medal – first place	2022 Madrid	63 kg
Gold medal – first place	2023 Bishkek	63 kg
Gold medal – first place	2024 Porec	67 kg
Gold medal – first place	2024 Zagreb	63 kg
Silver medal – second place	2023 Bucharest	63 kg
Silver medal – second place	2023 Alexandria	63 kg
Silver medal – second place	2024 Budapest	67 kg
Bronze medal – third place	2025 Budapest	67 kg
Bronze medal – third place	2025 Sassari	67 kg
World U23 Championships
Gold medal – first place	2021 Belgrade	63 kg
European U23 Championships
Bronze medal – third place	2018 Istanbul	63 kg
World Juniors Championships
Silver medal – second place	2019 Tallinn	63 kg
European Juniors Championships
Gold medal – first place	2017 Dortmund	60 kg
Silver medal – second place	2019 Pontevedra	63 kg
Bronze medal – third place	2018 Rome	63 kg
World Cadets Championships
Gold medal – first place	2016 Tbilisi	54 kg
Silver medal – second place	2014 Snina	46 kg
European Cadets Championships
Gold medal – first place	2015 Subotica	54 kg
Bronze medal – third place	2016 Stockholm	58 kg
Representing All-World Team
World Cup
Bronze medal – third place	2022 Baku	Team

Leri Abuladze (Georgian: ლერი აბულაძე; born 19 January 1999) is a Georgian Greco-Roman wrestler. He is a three-time medalist, including gold, at the World Wrestling Championships and a three-time medalist, including two gold medals, at the European Wrestling Championships.

== Career ==
In April 2021, Abuladze won one of the bronze medals in the 63 kg event at the 2021 European Wrestling Championships held in Warsaw, Poland. In November 2021, he won the gold medal in the 63 kg event at the 2021 U23 World Wrestling Championships held in Belgrade, Serbia.

Abuladze won the gold medal in the 63 kg event at the 2022 European Wrestling Championships held in Budapest, Hungary. He defeated Taleh Mammadov of Azerbaijan in his gold medal match.

He competed at the 2024 European Wrestling Olympic Qualification Tournament in Baku, Azerbaijan hoping to qualify for the 2024 Summer Olympics in Paris, France. He was eliminated in his third match and he did not qualify for the Olympics.

== Achievements ==
Year	Tournament	Location	Result	Event
2021	European Championships	Warsaw, Poland	3rd	Greco-Roman 63 kg
2021	World Championships	Oslo, Norway	2nd	Greco-Roman 63 kg
2022	European Championships	Budapest, Hungary	1st	Greco-Roman 63 kg
2022	World Championships	Belgrade, Serbia	2nd	Greco-Roman 63 kg
2023	European Championships	Zagreb, Croatia	1st	Greco-Roman 63 kg
2023	World Championships	Belgrade, Serbia	1st	Greco-Roman 63 kg
