= 2022 European Wrestling Championships – Men's Greco-Roman 63 kg =

Wrestling competition

Men's Greco-Roman 63 kg at the 2022 European Wrestling Championships
- Venue: BOK Sports Hall
- Location: Budapest, Hungary
- Dates: 1-2 April
- Competitors: 13

Medalists
gold medal	Leri Abuladze	Georgia
silver medal	Taleh Mammadov	Azerbaijan
bronze medal	Oleksandr Hrushyn	Ukraine
bronze medal	Ahmet Uyar	Turkey

The Men's Greco-Roman 63 kg is a competition featured at the 2022 European Wrestling Championships, and was held in Budapest, Hungary on April 1 and 2.

== Results ==
Legend

- F — Won by fall

=== Main Bracket ===
1/8 finals
Alexander Bica (SWE)	0
Oleksandr Hrushyn (UKR)	9
Etienne Kinsinger (GER)	8
Ruben Marvice (ITA)	0
Perica Dimitrijević (SRB)	0
Victor Ciobanu (MDA)	10
Mateusz Szewczuk (POL)	7
Aleksandrs Jurkjans (LAT)	6^{F}
Ahmet Uyar (TUR)	5
Krisztián Kecskeméti (HUN)	2

Quarterfinals
Leri Abuladze (GEO)	7
Oleksandr Hrushyn (UKR)	1
Etienne Kinsinger (GER)	3
Victor Ciobanu (MDA)	1
Hrachya Poghosyan (ARM)	9
Aleksandrs Jurkjans (LAT)	0
Ahmet Uyar (TUR)	1
Taleh Mammadov (AZE)	5

Semifinals
Leri Abuladze (GEO)	6
Etienne Kinsinger (GER)	2
Hrachya Poghosyan (ARM)	1
Taleh Mammadov (AZE)	3

Final
Leri Abuladze (GEO)	3
Taleh Mammadov (AZE)	1

=== Repechage ===
Bronze medal match
Oleksandr Hrushyn (UKR)	5
Etienne Kinsinger (GER)	2
Ahmet Uyar (TUR)	6
Hrachya Poghosyan (ARM)	5

== Final standing ==
Rank	Wrestler	UWW Points
1st place, gold medalist(s)	Leri Abuladze (GEO)	13000
2nd place, silver medalist(s)	Taleh Mammadov (AZE)	11000
3rd place, bronze medalist(s)	Oleksandr Hrushyn (UKR)	9500
3rd place, bronze medalist(s)	Ahmet Uyar (TUR)	9500
5	Hrachya Poghosyan (ARM)	8000
5	Etienne Kinsinger (GER)	8000
7	Aleksandrs Jurkjans (LAT)	7400
8	Victor Ciobanu (MDA)	7000
9	Krisztián Kecskeméti (HUN)	6500
10	Mateusz Szewczuk (POL)	6100
11	Ruben Marvice (ITA)	4000
12	Alexander Bica (SWE)	3800
13	Perica Dimitrijević (SRB)	3600
