= Wrestling at the 2022 Mediterranean Games – Men's Greco-Roman 60 kg =

Wrestling competitions

Men's Greco-Roman 60 kg at the 2022 Mediterranean Games
- Venue: EMEC Hall
- Date: 26–27 June
- Competitors: 10 from 10 nations

Medalists
gold medal	Kerem Kamal	Turkey
silver medal	Léo Tudezca	France
bronze medal	Haithem Mahmoud	Egypt
bronze medal	Ruben Marvice	Italy

The Men's Greco-Roman 60 kg competition of the wrestling events at the 2022 Mediterranean Games in Oran, Algeria, was held from 26 June to 27 June at the EMEC Hall.

== Results ==
Legend

- D — Disqualification
- F — Won by fall

Round of 16
Ruben Marvice (ITA)	6
Daniel Bobillo (ESP)	2
Fouad Fajari (MAR)	3
Léo Tudezca (FRA)	4

Quarterfinals
Abdeldjebar Djebbari (ALG)	0
Ivan Lizatović (CRO)	9
Haithem Mahmoud (EGY)	6
Kerem Kamal (TUR)	7
Bajram Sina (ALB)	0
Ahmad Al-Nakdali (SYR)	9
Ruben Marvice (ITA)	3
Léo Tudezca (FRA)	5

Semifinals
Ivan Lizatović (CRO)	1
Kerem Kamal (TUR)	9
Ahmad Al-Nakdali (SYR)	7
Léo Tudezca (FRA)	12^{F}

Final
Kerem Kamal (TUR)	8
Léo Tudezca (FRA)	0

Repechage round 1
Fouad Fajari (MAR)	1
Ruben Marvice (ITA)	9

Bronze medals
Haithem Mahmoud (EGY)	3
Ivan Lizatović (CRO)	0
Ruben Marvice (ITA)	10
~~Ahmad Al-Nakdali (SYR)~~	8^{D}
