= Pouya Dadmarz =

Iranian Greco-Roman wrestler

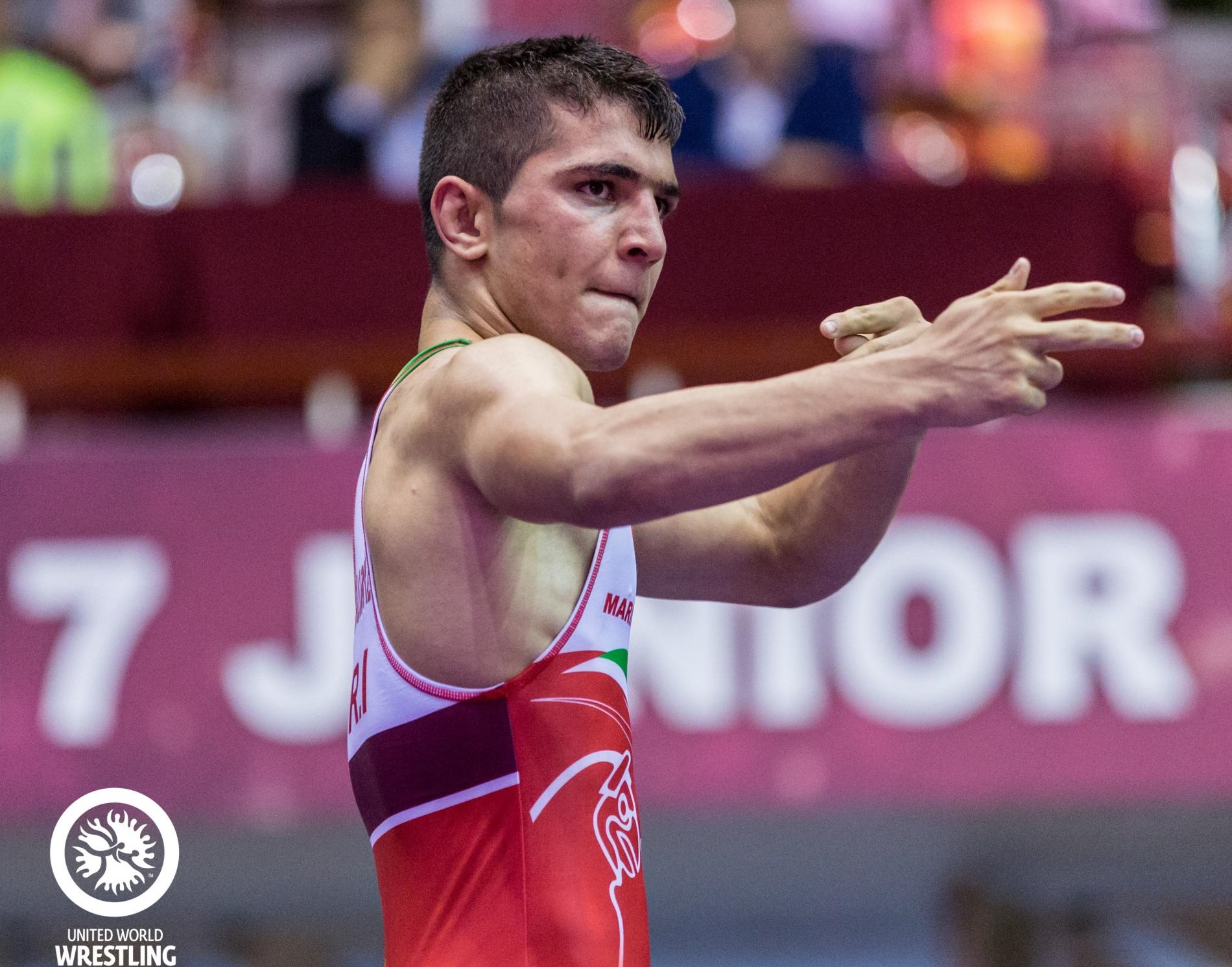

Personal information
- Native name: پویا دادمرز
- Nationality: Iranian
- Born: 10 November 1999 (age 26) Izeh, Iran

Sport
- Country: Iran
- Sport: Greco-Roman wrestling
- Weight class: 55 kg
Medal record
Men's Greco-Roman wrestling
Representing Iran
World Championships
Silver medal – second place	2024 Tirana	55 kg
Bronze medal – third place	2023 Belgrade	55 kg
Asian Championships
Gold medal – first place	2023 Astana	55 kg
Silver medal – second place	2024 Bishkek	55 kg
Bronze medal – third place	2021 Almaty	55 kg
World Cup
Gold medal – first place	2022 Baku	Team
Vehbi Emre & Hamit Kaplan Tournament
Gold medal – first place	2024 Antalya	55 kg
Grand Prix
Gold medal – first place	2019 Zagreb	55 kg
Gold medal – first place	2022 Almaty	55 kg
Gold medal – first place	2023 Zagreb	55 kg
Silver medal – second place	2024 Budapest	55 kg
Bronze medal – third place	2026 Zagreb	55 kg
World U23 Championships
Gold medal – first place	2022 Pontevedra	55 kg
Silver medal – second place	2021 Belgrade	55 kg
Asian U23 Championship
Silver medal – second place	2019 Ulaanbaatar	55 kg
World Junior Championship
Gold medal – first place	2017 Tampere	50 kg
Bronze medal – third place	2019 Tallinn	55 kg
Asian Junior Championship
Gold medal – first place	2017 Taichung	50 kg

Pouya Dadmarz (Persian: پویا دادمرز) is an Iranian Greco-Roman wrestler.

== Career ==
In 2021, Dadmarz won a bronze medal in the 55 kg event at Asian Championships and a silver medal in same weight at 2021 Vehbi Emre & Hamit Kaplan Tournament. In 2022, he won gold medal at the 2022 Bolat Turlykhanov Cup held in Almaty, Kazakhstan in 55 kg.

Dadmarz placed eighth at 2022 World Wrestling Championships in category 55 kg.

== Personal life ==
On 29 December 2025, Dadmarz publicly supported the 2025–2026 Iranian protests by reposting images of the protests, but deleted the post hours later.
