= Walihan Sailike =

Chinese Greco-Roman wrestler

Personal information
- Native name: 瓦里汗·赛里克; Уәлихан Серік
- Born: 3 March 1992 (age 34) Emin County, Xinjiang, China

Sport
- Country: China
- Sport: Amateur wrestling
- Weight class: 60 kg
- Event: Greco-Roman
Medal record
Men's Greco-Roman wrestling
Representing China
Olympic Games
Bronze medal – third place	2020 Tokyo	60 kg
World Championships
Bronze medal – third place	2018 Budapest	60 kg

Walihan Sailike (also known as Walihan Serik; Kazakh: Уәлихан Серік; born 3 March 1992, Emin County) is a Chinese Greco-Roman wrestler of Kazakh ethnicity. He won one of the bronze medal in the 60 kg event at the 2020 Summer Olympics held in Tokyo, Japan.

In 2018, he won one of the bronze medals in the 60 kg event at the World Wrestling Championships held in Budapest, Hungary. He also competed in the men's Greco-Roman 60 kg event at the 2018 Asian Games held in Jakarta, Indonesia. In 2019, he competed in the 60 kg event at the World Wrestling Championships held in Nur-Sultan, Kazakhstan.

== Achievements ==
Year	Tournament	Location	Result	Event
2018	World Championships	Budapest, Hungary	3rd	Greco-Roman 60 kg
2020	Summer Olympics	Tokyo, Japan	3rd	Greco-Roman 60 kg
