= 2021 Vehbi Emre & Hamit Kaplan Tournament =

- Host city: Istanbul, Turkey
- Dates: June 18–20, 2021
- Stadium: Cebeci Sports Complex

The 38th Vehbi Emre & Hamit Kaplan Tournament 2021 was a wrestling event held in Istanbul, Turkey between 18 and 20 June 2021.

The international tournament included competition men's Greco-Roman wrestling. The tournament was held in honor of the Turkish Olympic champion Hamit Kaplan and Turkish wrestler and manager Vehbi Emre.

== Medal table ==
Rank	Nation	Gold	Silver	Bronze	Total
1	Turkey*	4	2	4	10
2	Russia	3	3	2	8
3	Iran	3	2	2	7
4	Kyrgyzstan	0	1	4	5
5	Hungary	0	1	3	4
6	Kazakhstan	0	1	2	3
7	Tunisia	0	0	1	1
Totals (7 entries)		10	10	18	38

== Team ranking ==
Rank	Men's Greco-Roman	
Rank	Team	Points
1	Turkey	192
2	Russia	177
3	Iran	132
4	Kyrgyzstan	92
5	Hungary	65

== Medal overview ==
=== Men's Greco-Roman ===
Event	Gold	Silver	Bronze
55 kg	Sajjad Abbaspour; Iran	Pouya Dadmarz; Iran	Viktor Vedernikov; Russia
60 kg	Kerem Kamal; Turkey	Zholaman Sharshenbekov; Kyrgyzstan	Meirambek Ainagulov; Kazakhstan
60 kg	Kerem Kamal; Turkey	Zholaman Sharshenbekov; Kyrgyzstan	Aidos Sultangali; Kazakhstan
63 kg	Ibragim Labazanov; Russia	Mehmet Çeker; Turkey	Meisam Dalkhani; Iran
63 kg	Ibragim Labazanov; Russia	Mehmet Çeker; Turkey	Mustafa Safa Yıldırım; Turkey
67 kg	Artem Surkov; Russia	Hossein Asadi; Iran	Ensar Karabacak; Turkey
67 kg	Artem Surkov; Russia	Hossein Asadi; Iran	Bálint Korpási; Hungary
72 kg	Mohammad Reza Mokhtari; Iran	Murat Dağ; Turkey	Stanislav Zaitsev; Russia
72 kg	Mohammad Reza Mokhtari; Iran	Murat Dağ; Turkey	Amin Kavianinejad; Iran
77 kg	Furkan Bayrak; Turkey	Demeu Zhadrayev; Kazakhstan	Tamás Lőrincz; Hungary
77 kg	Furkan Bayrak; Turkey	Demeu Zhadrayev; Kazakhstan	Akzhol Makhmudov; Kyrgyzstan
82 kg	Burhan Akbudak; Turkey	Rafael Iunusov; Russia	Kalidin Asykeev; Kyrgyzstan
82 kg	Burhan Akbudak; Turkey	Rafael Iunusov; Russia	Salih Aydın; Turkey
87 kg	Ramin Taheri; Iran	Vaag Margarian; Russia	Viktor Lőrincz; Hungary
87 kg	Ramin Taheri; Iran	Vaag Margarian; Russia	Atabek Azisbekov; Kyrgyzstan
97 kg	Musa Evloev; Russia	Alex Szőke; Hungary	Abdul Kadir Çebi; Turkey
97 kg	Musa Evloev; Russia	Alex Szőke; Hungary	Uzur Dzhuzupbekov; Kyrgyzstan
130 kg	Osman Yıldırım; Turkey	Zurabi Gedekhauri; Russia	Amine Guennichi; Tunisia

== Participating nations ==
111 competitors from 11 nations participated.

- Azerbaijan (1)
- Brazil (1)
- Bulgaria (6)
- Hungary (4)
- Iran (15)
- Kazakhstan (8)
- Kyrgyzstan (12)
- Russia (15)
- Tunisia (3)
- Turkey (45)
- Ukraine (1)
