= Sergey Emelin =

Russian sport wrestler (born 1995)

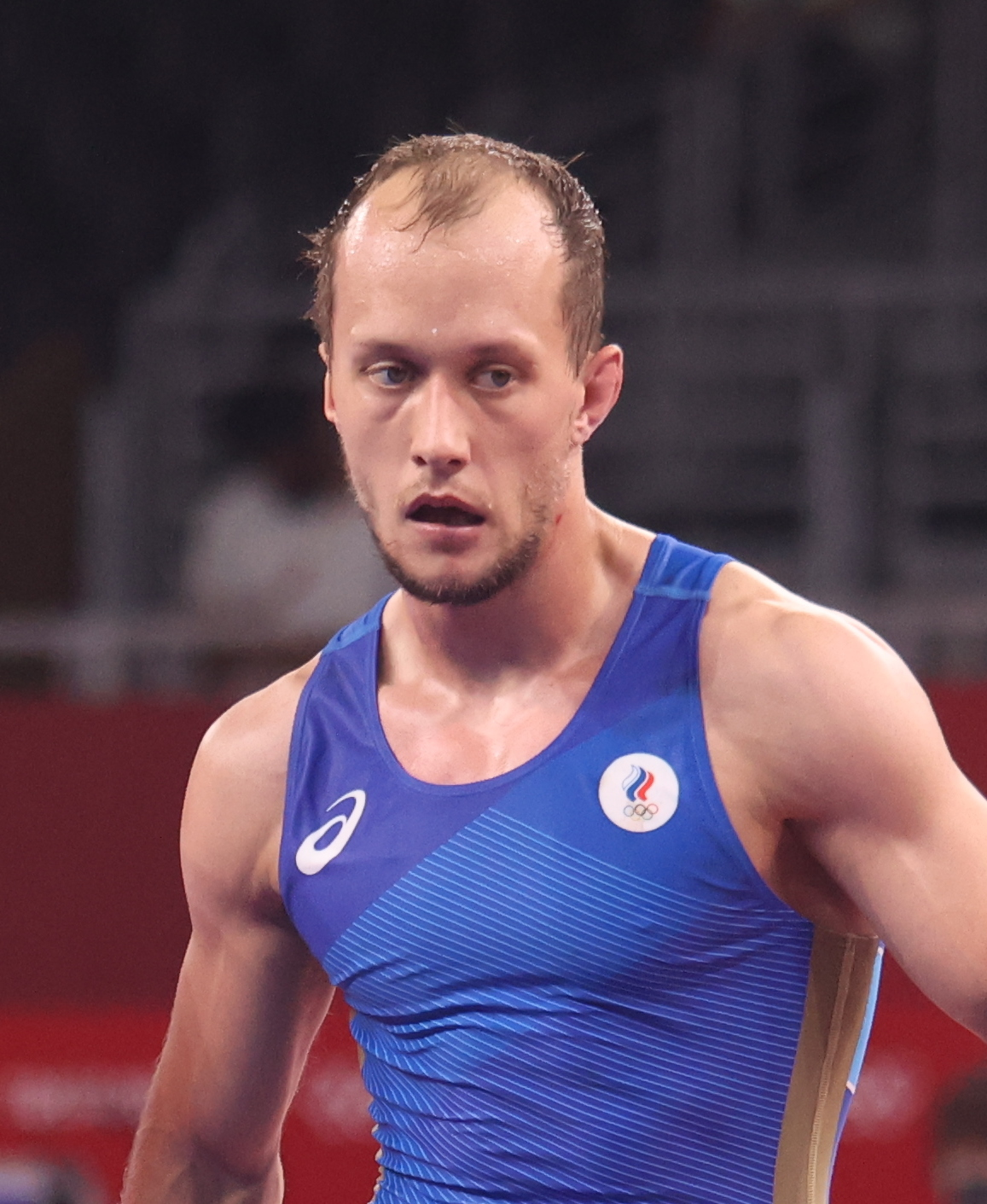
- Emelin at the 2020 Summer Olympics

Personal information
- Full name: Sergey Aleksandrovich Emelin
- Nationality: (Russia) Russian
- Born: 16 June 1995 (age 31) Ruzayevka, Republic of Mordovia, Russia
- Height: 1.70 m (5 ft 7 in)
- Weight: 60 kg (130 lb)

Sport
- Country: Russia
- Sport: Wrestling
- Event: Greco-Roman
- Club: Vityaz WC
- Coached by: Nikolai Slesarev
Medal record
Men's Greco-Roman wrestling
Representing (Russia) ROC
Olympic Games
Bronze medal – third place	2020 Tokyo	60 kg
Representing Russia
World Championships
Gold medal – first place	2018 Budapest	60 kg
Silver medal – second place	2019 Nur-Sultan	60 kg
Bronze medal – third place	2026 Astana	63 kg
European Championships
Gold medal – first place	2018 Kaspiysk	60 kg
Silver medal – second place	2019 Bucharest	60 kg
Ivan Poddubny Memorial
Gold medal – first place	2018 Krasnodar	60 kg
World U23 Championships
Silver medal – second place	2017 Bydgoszcz	59 kg

Sergey Aleksandrovich Emelin (Russian: Сергей Александрович Емелин, IPA: [sʲɪrˈɡʲej jɪˈmʲelʲɪn]; born 16 June 1995) is a Russian Greco-Roman wrestler. He is a World and European Champion in 60 kg. At the 2018 European Wrestling Championships in Kaspiysk, Emelin defeated his opponents en route without losing points, but in the final he defeated Murad Mammadov from Azerbaijan in a tight match. At the 2018 World Wrestling Championships he beat all of his opponents, winning overall 44–1.
