= Mohammad Reza Mokhtari =

Iranian Greco-Roman wrestler

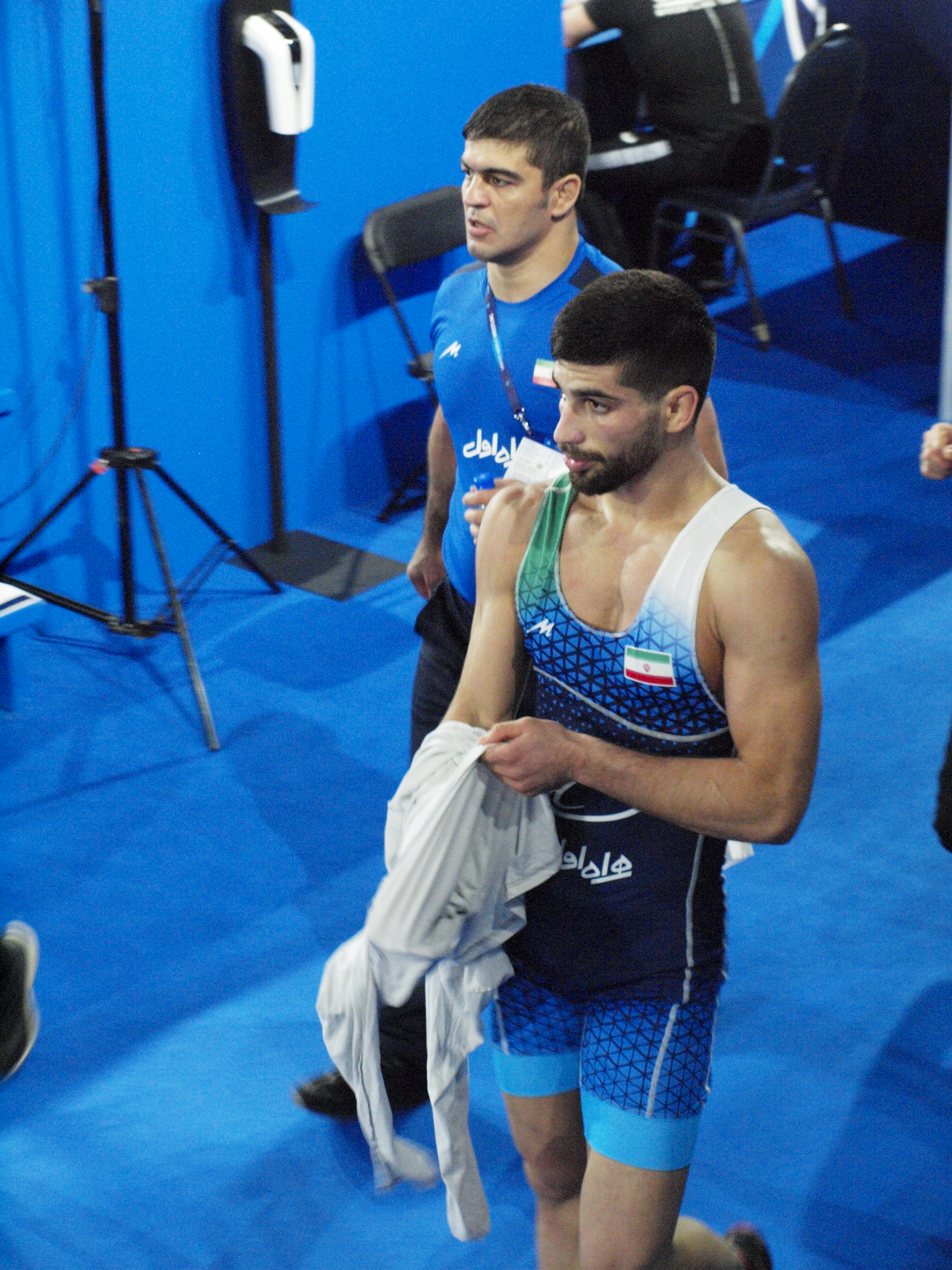

Personal information
- Native name: محمدرضا مختاری
- Nationality: Iran
- Born: Shiraz, Iran

Sport
- Country: Iran
- Sport: Greco-Roman wrestling
- Weight class: 72 kg
Medal record
Men's Greco-Roman wrestling
Representing Iran
Asian Championships
| Gold medal – first place | 2022 Ulaanbaatar | 72 kg |
World Cup
| Gold medal – first place | 2022 Baku | Team |
Vehbi Emre & Hamit Kaplan Tournament
| Gold medal – first place | 2021 Istanbul | 72 kg |
Grand Prix
| Bronze medal – third place | 2024 Budapest | 77 kg |
| Bronze medal – third place | 2026 Zagreb | 82 kg |
Cadet World Championships
| Silver medal – second place | 2016 Tbilisi | 58 kg |
Cadet Asian Championships
| Gold medal – first place | 2016 Taichung | 58 kg |
| Silver medal – second place | 2014 Bangkok | 42 kg |

Mohammad Reza Mokhtari (Persian: محمدرضا مختاری) is an Iranian Greco-Roman wrestler. He reached semi final in the 72 kg event at the 2021 World Wrestling Championships held in Oslo, Norway.

He won the gold medal in the 72 kg event at 2022 Asian Wrestling Championships.

He won gold medal in the 72 kg event at 2021 Vehbi Emre & Hamit Kaplan Tournament.
