= Jacopo Sandron =

Italian Greco-Roman wrestler (born 1998)

Personal information
- Born: 1 May 1998 (age 28)

Sport
- Country: Italy
- Sport: Amateur wrestling
- Weight class: 60 kg
- Event: Greco-Roman
Medal record
Men's Greco-Roman wrestling
Representing Italy
European Championships
Bronze medal – third place	2018 Kaspiysk	60 kg
Grand Prix
Bronze medal – third place	2024 Zagreb	63 kg

Jacopo Sandron (born 1 May 1998) is an Italian Greco-Roman wrestler. He is a bronze medalist at the European Wrestling Championships.

== Career ==
At the 2018 European Wrestling Championships held in Kaspiysk, Russia, Sandron won one of the bronze medals in the 60 kg event.

In 2019, Sandron represented Italy at the European Games in the 60 kg event without winning a medal. He was eliminated in his first match by Dato Chkhartishvili of Georgia.

In March 2021, he competed at the European Qualification Tournament in Budapest, Hungary hoping to qualify for the 2020 Summer Olympics in Tokyo, Japan. He also competed at the 2024 European Wrestling Olympic Qualification Tournament in Baku, Azerbaijan hoping to qualify for the 2024 Summer Olympics in Paris, France. He was eliminated in his first match and he did not qualify for the Olympics.

== Achievements ==
Year	Tournament	Location	Result	Event
2018	European Championships	Kaspiysk, Russia	3rd	Greco-Roman 60 kg
