= Dato Chkhartishvili =

Georgian Greco-Roman wrestler

Sport
- Country: Georgia
- Sport: Amateur wrestling
- Weight class: 60 kg
- Event: Greco-Roman
Medal record
Men's Greco-Roman wrestling
Representing Georgia
European Games
Bronze medal – third place	2019 Minsk	60 kg
European Championships
Bronze medal – third place	2018 Kaspiysk	60 kg
European U23 Championship
Bronze medal – third place	2018 Istanbul	60 kg

Dato Chkhartishvili is a Georgian Greco-Roman wrestler. He is a bronze medalist at the European Wrestling Championships and the European Games.

== Career ==
At the 2018 European Wrestling Championships held in Kaspiysk, Russia, he won one of the bronze medals in the 60 kg event. In that same year, he also won one of the bronze medals in the men's 60 kg event at the 2018 European U23 Wrestling Championship held in Istanbul, Turkey.

In 2019, he represented Georgia at the 2019 European Games in Minsk, Belarus and he won one of the bronze medals in the 60 kg event. In May 2021, he failed to qualify for the 2020 Summer Olympics at the World Olympic Qualification Tournament held in Sofia, Bulgaria.

== Achievements ==
Year	Tournament	Location	Result	Event
2018	European Championships	Kaspiysk, Russia	3rd	Greco-Roman 60 kg
2019	European Games	Minsk, Belarus	3rd	Greco-Roman 60 kg
