= 2021 U23 World Wrestling Championships =

- Host city: Serbia, Belgrade
- Dates: November 1–7
- Stadium: Belexpo Center

Champions
- Freestyle: Russia
- Greco-Roman: Russia
- Women: Russia

The 2021 U23 World Wrestling Championships was the fourth edition of the U23 World Wrestling Championships of combined events and it was held from 1 to 7 November 2021 in Belgrade, Serbia.

== Medal table ==
Rank	Nation	Gold	Silver	Bronze	Total
1	Russia	7	8	7	22
2	Ukraine	3	2	3	8
3	Azerbaijan	3	0	3	6
4	Iran	2	6	7	15
5	Kyrgyzstan	2	1	0	3
6	Georgia	2	0	2	4
6	United States	2	0	2	4
8	Armenia	1	2	5	8
9	Hungary	1	1	2	4
10	France	1	1	0	2
10	Greece	1	1	0	2
12	Canada	1	0	1	2
12	Germany	1	0	1	2
12	Poland	1	0	1	2
12	Romania	1	0	1	2
16	Ecuador	1	0	0	1
17	Turkey	0	2	8	10
18	India	0	2	3	5
19	Belarus	0	1	1	2
19	Moldova	0	1	1	2
21	Colombia	0	1	0	1
21	Switzerland	0	1	0	1
23	Italy	0	0	2	2
23	Latvia	0	0	2	2
23	Mongolia	0	0	2	2
26	Austria	0	0	1	1
26	Finland	0	0	1	1
26	Kazakhstan	0	0	1	1
26	Nigeria	0	0	1	1
26	Serbia	0	0	1	1
26	Sweden	0	0	1	1
Totals (31 entries)		30	30	60	120

== Team ranking ==
Rank	Men's freestyle		Men's Greco-Roman		Women's freestyle	
Rank	Team	Points	Team	Points	Team	Points
1	Russia	145	Russia	190	Russia	145
2	Iran	140	Iran	155	Ukraine	136
3	Armenia	114	Georgia	105	India	105
4	Azerbaijan	93	Turkey	91	United States	103
5	Turkey	72	Hungary	86	Turkey	59
6	Ukraine	56	Azerbaijan	67	Canada	52
7	United States	54	Armenia	64	Italy	50
8	Moldova	53	Ukraine	60	France	47
9	Kyrgyzstan	49	Germany	35	Romania	46
10	Greece	45	Sweden	31	Poland	45

== Medal summary ==
=== Men's freestyle ===
Event	Gold	Silver	Bronze
57 kg	Aliabbas Rzazade; Azerbaijan	Bekbolot Myrzanazar Uulu; Kyrgyzstan	Ahmad Javan; Iran
57 kg	Aliabbas Rzazade; Azerbaijan	Bekbolot Myrzanazar Uulu; Kyrgyzstan	Manvel Khndzrtsyan; Armenia
61 kg	Arsen Harutyunyan; Armenia	Artur Chebodaev; Russia	Assyl Aitakyn; Kazakhstan
61 kg	Arsen Harutyunyan; Armenia	Artur Chebodaev; Russia	Narmandakhyn Narankhüü; Mongolia
65 kg	Georgios Pilidis; Greece	Ibragim Abdurakhmanov; Russia	Ziraddin Bayramov; Azerbaijan
65 kg	Georgios Pilidis; Greece	Ibragim Abdurakhmanov; Russia	Cavit Acar; Turkey
70 kg	Ernazar Akmataliev; Kyrgyzstan	Vazgen Tevanyan; Armenia	Ali Akbar Fazli; Iran
70 kg	Ernazar Akmataliev; Kyrgyzstan	Vazgen Tevanyan; Armenia	Nicolai Grahmez; Moldova
74 kg	Chermen Valiev; Russia	Mohammad Sadegh Firouzpour; Iran	Temuri Beruashvili; Georgia
74 kg	Chermen Valiev; Russia	Mohammad Sadegh Firouzpour; Iran	Hrayr Alikhanyan; Armenia
79 kg	Magomed Magomaev; Russia	Ramazan Sarı; Turkey	Arman Avagyan; Armenia
79 kg	Magomed Magomaev; Russia	Ramazan Sarı; Turkey	Ali Savadkouhi; Iran
86 kg	Mukhammed Aliiev; Ukraine	Sajjad Gholami; Iran	Lars Schäfle; Germany
86 kg	Mukhammed Aliiev; Ukraine	Sajjad Gholami; Iran	Ivars Samušonoks; Latvia
92 kg	Osman Nurmagomedov; Azerbaijan	Azamat Zakuev; Russia	Amir Hossein Firouzpour; Iran
92 kg	Osman Nurmagomedov; Azerbaijan	Azamat Zakuev; Russia	Erhan Yaylacı; Turkey
97 kg	Amir Ali Azarpira; Iran	Radu Lefter; Moldova	Danylo Stasiuk; Ukraine
97 kg	Amir Ali Azarpira; Iran	Radu Lefter; Moldova	Jonathan Aiello; United States
125 kg	Tony Cassioppi; United States	Azamat Khosonov; Greece	Saipudin Magomedov; Russia
125 kg	Tony Cassioppi; United States	Azamat Khosonov; Greece	Mehdi Hashemi; Iran

=== Men's Greco-Roman ===
Event	Gold	Silver	Bronze
55 kg	Mavlud Rizmanov; Russia	Pouya Dadmarz; Iran	Adem Uzun; Turkey
55 kg	Mavlud Rizmanov; Russia	Pouya Dadmarz; Iran	Nihad Guluzade; Azerbaijan
60 kg	Anvar Allakhiarov; Russia	Mehdi Mohsennejad; Iran	Pridon Abuladze; Georgia
60 kg	Anvar Allakhiarov; Russia	Mehdi Mohsennejad; Iran	Kerem Kamal; Turkey
63 kg	Leri Abuladze; Georgia	Ahmet Uyar; Turkey	Hrachya Poghosyan; Armenia
63 kg	Leri Abuladze; Georgia	Ahmet Uyar; Turkey	Alireza Nejati; Iran
67 kg	Hasrat Jafarov; Azerbaijan	Mohammad Javad Rezaei; Iran	Kadir Kamal; Turkey
67 kg	Hasrat Jafarov; Azerbaijan	Mohammad Javad Rezaei; Iran	Miakhdi Iakhiaev; Russia
72 kg	Idris Ibaev; Germany	Sergey Kutuzov; Russia	Shant Khachatryan; Armenia
72 kg	Idris Ibaev; Germany	Sergey Kutuzov; Russia	Ulvu Ganizade; Azerbaijan
77 kg	Tamás Lévai; Hungary	Amin Kavianinejad; Iran	Per Albin Olofsson; Sweden
77 kg	Tamás Lévai; Hungary	Amin Kavianinejad; Iran	Sergei Stepanov; Russia
82 kg	Aivengo Rikadze; Georgia	Ramon Betschart; Switzerland	Branko Kovačević; Serbia
82 kg	Aivengo Rikadze; Georgia	Ramon Betschart; Switzerland	Shamil Ozhaev; Russia
87 kg	Aleksandr Komarov; Russia	Dávid Losonczi; Hungary	Szymon Szymonowicz; Poland
87 kg	Aleksandr Komarov; Russia	Dávid Losonczi; Hungary	Nasser Alizadeh; Iran
97 kg	Artur Sargsian; Russia	Pavel Hlinchuk; Belarus	Arvi Savolainen; Finland
97 kg	Artur Sargsian; Russia	Pavel Hlinchuk; Belarus	Markus Ragginger; Austria
130 kg	Amin Mirzazadeh; Iran	David Ovasapyan; Armenia	Dáriusz Vitek; Hungary
130 kg	Amin Mirzazadeh; Iran	David Ovasapyan; Armenia	Mikhail Laptev; Russia

=== Women's freestyle ===
Event	Gold	Silver	Bronze
50 kg	Emily Shilson; United States	Shivani Pawar; India	Ştefania Priceputu; Romania
50 kg	Emily Shilson; United States	Shivani Pawar; India	Maria Tiumerekova; Russia
53 kg	Lucía Yépez; Ecuador	Ekaterina Verbina; Russia	Zeynep Yetgil; Turkey
53 kg	Lucía Yépez; Ecuador	Ekaterina Verbina; Russia	Mariia Vynnyk; Ukraine
55 kg	Andreea Ana; Romania	Viktoriia Vaulina; Russia	Eda Tekin; Turkey
55 kg	Andreea Ana; Romania	Viktoriia Vaulina; Russia	Anju Anju; India
57 kg	Alina Hrushyna; Ukraine	Kristina Mikhneva; Russia	Esther Kolawole; Nigeria
57 kg	Alina Hrushyna; Ukraine	Kristina Mikhneva; Russia	Hannah Taylor; Canada
59 kg	Anhelina Lysak; Poland	Solomiia Vynnyk; Ukraine	Kristina Sazykina; Belarus
59 kg	Anhelina Lysak; Poland	Solomiia Vynnyk; Ukraine	Anna Szél; Hungary
62 kg	Ana Godinez; Canada	Kateryna Zelenykh; Ukraine	Anastasia Parokhina; Russia
62 kg	Ana Godinez; Canada	Kateryna Zelenykh; Ukraine	Radhika Jaglan; India
65 kg	Dinara Kudaeva; Russia	Nisha Dahiya; India	Aslı Demir; Turkey
65 kg	Dinara Kudaeva; Russia	Nisha Dahiya; India	Elma Zeidlere; Latvia
68 kg	Koumba Larroque; France	Vusala Parfianovich; Russia	Enkhsaikhany Delgermaa; Mongolia
68 kg	Koumba Larroque; France	Vusala Parfianovich; Russia	Oksana Chudyk; Ukraine
72 kg	Anastasiya Alpyeyeva; Ukraine	Kendra Dacher; France	Divya Kakran; India
72 kg	Anastasiya Alpyeyeva; Ukraine	Kendra Dacher; France	Eleni Pjollaj; Italy
76 kg	Aiperi Medet Kyzy; Kyrgyzstan	Tatiana Rentería; Colombia	Enrica Rinaldi; Italy
76 kg	Aiperi Medet Kyzy; Kyrgyzstan	Tatiana Rentería; Colombia	Kylie Welker; United States

^{a} ^{Women's freestyle 65 kg} Anastasiia Lavrenchuk of Ukraine originally won the gold medal, but was disqualified in March 2024 after a retest of her 2021 sample tested positive for banned substances.
