= Ahmet Uyar =

Turkish Greco-Roman wrestler

Personal information
- Born: 14 January 1998 (age 28) Kahramanmaraş, Turkey
- Height: 165 cm (5 ft 5 in)
- Weight: 63 kg (139 lb; 9.9 st)

Sport
- Country: Turkey
- Sport: Amateur wrestling
- Event: Greco-Roman
- Club: İstanbul Büyükşehir Belediyesi S.K.
Medal record
Men's Greco-Roman wrestling
Representing Turkey
European Championships
Bronze medal – third place	2022 Budapest	63 kg
World U23 Championships
Silver medal – second place	2021 Belgrade	63 kg
Vehbi Emre & Hamit Kaplan Tournament
Bronze medal – third place	2022 Istanbul	63 kg
Bronze medal – third place	2019 Istanbul	60 kg
Dan Kolov & Nikola Petrov Tournament
Bronze medal – third place	2021 Plovdiv	60 kg
Grand Prix
Gold medal – first place	2022 Zagreb	63 kg
Silver medal – second place	2021 Zagreb	60 kg
Silver medal – second place	2021 Rome	60 kg

Ahmet Uyar is a Turkish Greco-Roman wrestler competing in the 63 kg division. He is a member of İstanbul Büyükşehir Belediyesi S.K.

== Career ==
Ahmet Uyar won the silver medal in the 63 kg event at the 2021 U23 World Wrestling Championships held in Belgrade, Serbia.

In 2022, he won one of the bronze medals in his event at the Vehbi Emre & Hamit Kaplan Tournament held in Istanbul, Turkey. He won one of the bronze medals in the men's 63 kg event at the 2022 European Wrestling Championships held in Budapest, Hungary.

== Major results ==
Year	Tournament	Location	Result	Event
2022	European Championships	Budapest, Hungary	3rd	Greco-Roman 63 kg
