= Meirambek Ainagulov =

Kazakhstani sport wrestler (born 1994)

Personal information
- Nationality: (Kazakhstan) Kazakhstani
- Born: 17 February 1994 (age 32) Aktobe, Kazakhstan
- Height: 1.68 m (5 ft 6 in)

Sport
- Country: Kazakhstan
- Sport: Wrestling
- Weight class: 63 kg
- Event: Greco-Roman
Medal record
Men's Greco-Roman wrestling
Representing Kazakhstan
World Championships
Silver medal – second place	2017 Paris	59 kg
Bronze medal – third place	2019 Nur-Sultan	60 kg
Asian Championships
Silver medal – second place	2022 Ulaanbaatar	63 kg
Bronze medal – third place	2016 Bangkok	59 kg
Bronze medal – third place	2017 New Delhi	59 kg
Bronze medal – third place	2018 Bishkek	63 kg
Asian Games
Bronze medal – third place	2018 Jakarta	60 kg
Vehbi Emre & Hamit Kaplan Tournament
Bronze medal – third place	2021 Istanbul	60 kg
Bronze medal – third place	2024 Antalya	60 kg

Meirambek Ainagulov (also spelled Mirambek, born 17 February 1994) is a Kazakhstani sport wrestler who competes in the men's Greco Roman category. He has claimed two medals at the World Wrestling Championships, silver medal in the men's 59 kg event in 2017 and bronze medal in the men's 60 kg event. He was qualified to represent Kazakhstan at the 2020 Summer Olympics following his medal success at the 2019 World Wrestling Championships.
