= Etienne Kinsinger =

German Greco-Roman wrestler

Personal information
- Born: 8 September 1996 (age 29) Püttlingen, Germany

Sport
- Country: Germany
- Sport: Amateur wrestling
- Event: Greco-Roman

Etienne Kinsinger (born 8 September 1996) is a German Greco-Roman wrestler.

Kinsinger competed at the World Wrestling Championships in 2017, 2018 and 2019. He also competed at the European Wrestling Championships in 2018 and 2019.

In March 2021, Kinsinger qualified at the European Qualification Tournament to compete at the 2020 Summer Olympics in Tokyo, Japan. He competed in the men's 60 kg event where he was eliminated in his first match.

Kinsinger lost his bronze medal match in the 63 kg event at the 2022 European Wrestling Championships in Budapest, Hungary.

Kinsinger competed at the 2024 European Wrestling Olympic Qualification Tournament in Baku, Azerbaijan hoping to qualify for the 2024 Summer Olympics in Paris, France. He was eliminated in his first match and he did not qualify for the Olympics. Kinsinger also competed at the 2024 World Wrestling Olympic Qualification Tournament held in Istanbul, Turkey without qualifying for the Olympics.
