= Kerem Kamal =

Turkish Greco-Roman wrestler

Kerem Kazım Kamal
Personal information
- Born: 10 August 1999 (age 27) Manisa, Turkey
- Education: Physical education Balıkesir University
- Height: 1.62 m (5 ft 4 in)
- Weight: 60 kg (132 lb)

Sport
- Country: Turkey
- Sport: Amateur wrestling
- Greco-Roman: 60 kg
- Event: Greco-Roman
- Club: İstanbul Büyükşehir Belediyesi S.K.
Medal record
Men's Greco-Roman wrestling
Representing Turkey
European Championships
Gold medal – first place	2022 Budapest	60 kg
Gold medal – first place	2025 Bratislava	63 kg
Bronze medal – third place	2026 Tirana	63 kg
Silver medal – second place	2021 Warsaw	60 kg
Bronze medal – third place	2019 Bucharest	60 kg
Mediterranean Games
Gold medal – first place	2022 Oran	60 kg
Vehbi Emre & Hamit Kaplan Tournament
Gold medal – first place	2021 Istanbul	60 kg
Gold medal – first place	2023 Istanbul	60 kg
Silver medal – second place	2019 Istanbul	60 kg
Grand Prix
Gold medal – first place	2019 Zagreb	60 kg
Gold medal – first place	2020 Zagreb	60 kg
Gold medal – first place	2021 Nice	60 kg
Gold medal – first place	2022 Almaty	63 kg
Gold medal – first place	2023 Alexandria	60 kg
Gold medal – first place	2023 Budapest	60 kg
World U23 Championships
Gold medal – first place	2022 Pontevedra	60 kg
Bronze medal – third place	2018 Bucharest	60 kg
Bronze medal – third place	2021 Belgrade	60 kg
European U23 Championships
Gold medal – first place	2018 Istanbul	60 kg
Gold medal – first place	2019 Novi Sad	60 kg
World Juniors Championships
Gold medal – first place	2017 Tampere	55 kg
Gold medal – first place	2018 Trnava	60 kg
Gold medal – first place	2019 Tallinn	60 kg
European Juniors Championships
Gold medal – first place	2017 Dortmund	55 kg

Kerem Kamal (born 10 August 1999) is a Turkish wrestler competing in the 60 kg division of Greco-Roman wrestling. He is a member of İstanbul Büyükşehir Belediyesi S.K.. He won the gold medal in the 60 kg event at the 2022 European Wrestling Championships held in Budapest, Hungary.

== Career ==
In 2018, he won the gold medal in the men's 60 kg event at the European U23 Wrestling Championship held in Istanbul, Turkey. In that same year, he also won one of the bronze medals in that event at the 2018 World U23 Wrestling Championship held in Bucharest, Romania.

In 2020, he won the silver medal in the 60 kg event at the European Wrestling Championships held in Rome, Italy. A year earlier, he won one of the bronze medals in this event.

In March 2021, he qualified at the European Qualification Tournament to compete at the 2020 Summer Olympics in Tokyo, Japan. He competed in the men's 60 kg event where he was eliminated in his first match.

In November 2021, he won one of the bronze medals in that event at the 2021 U23 World Wrestling Championships held in Belgrade, Serbia.

He won the gold medal in the 60 kg event at the 2022 European Wrestling Championships held in Budapest, Hungary. He also won the gold medal in the 60 kg event at the 2022 Mediterranean Games held in Oran, Algeria.

In 2026, he won one of the bronze medals in the 63 kg event at the 2026 European Wrestling Championships held in Tirana, Albania.

== Achievements ==
Year	Tournament	Location	Result	Event
2019	European Championships	Bucharest, Romania	3rd	Greco-Roman 60 kg
2020	European Championships	Rome, Italy	2nd	Greco-Roman 60 kg
2021	European Championships	Warsaw, Poland	2nd	Greco-Roman 60 kg
2022	European Championships	Budapest, Hungary	1st	Greco-Roman 60 kg
2022	Mediterranean Games	Oran, Algeria	1st	Greco-Roman 60 kg
2025	European Championships	Bratislava, Slovakia	1st	Greco-Roman 63 kg
2026	European Championships	Tirana, Albania	3rd	Greco-Roman 63 kg
