= Armen Melikyan =

Armenian wrestler (born 1996)

Personal information
- Nationality: Armenia
- Born: 7 November 1996 (age 30) Vagharshapat, Armenia
- Weight: 60 kg (132 lb)

Sport
- Sport: Greco-Roman wrestling

Armen Melikyan (born 7 February 1996) is an Armenian Greco-Roman wrestler.

He is representing Armenia in the 2020 Tokyo Olympics, where he will be competing in the 60 kg weight category on August 1.

== Career highlights ==
- 2013 European Junior Champion
- 2015 Youth Champion of Armenia
- 2016 Youth Champion of Armenia
- 2017 Gold Medalist at Senior Championship of Armenia in 60 kg weight category
- 2019 Champion at U23 World Championship in Hungary.
