= Badminton at the 2024 BRICS Games – Women's singles =

Badminton event

Women's singles at the 2024 BRICS Games
- Venue: Kazan Gymnastics Center
- Dates: 13 – 16 June 2024

Medalists
gold medal	Evgeniya Kosetskaya	Russia
silver medal	Mariia Golubeva	Russia
bronze medal	Sayane Regina Lima	Brazil
bronze medal	Sofiya Yanouskaya	Belarus

The women's singles badminton tournament at the 2024 BRICS Games took place from 13 to 16 June 2024 at the Kazan Gymnastics Center at Kazan.

Evgeniya Kosetskaya emerged as champion in the women's singles event after defeating compatriot Mariia Golubeva in the final.

== Competition format ==
Similar to the Olympics, the tournament started with a group phase round-robin followed by a knockout stage. For the group stage, the players were divided into 3 groups of between 3 players each. Each group played a round-robin. The top two players in each group advanced to the knockout rounds. The knockout stage was a three-round single elimination tournament.

Matches were played best-of-three games. Each game was played to 21, except that a player must win by 2 unless the score reaches 30–29.

== Schedule ==
The tournament was held over a 4-day period.

Legend

P	Preliminaries	QF	Quarter-finals	SF	Semi-finals	M	Medal matches

Date	13 Jun	14 Jun	15 Jun	16 Jun
Men's singles	P	QF	SF	M

== Group stage ==
The group stage was played on 13 June. The winner and runner-up of each group advanced to the knockout rounds.

=== Group 1 ===
Pos	Team	Pld	W	L	GF	GA	GD	PF	PA	PD	Pts	Qualification
1	Evgeniya Kosetskaya (RUS) (H)	2	2	0	4	0	+4	84	19	+65	2	Advance to semi-finals
2	Fulla Alnajjar (SYR)	2	1	1	2	2	0	54	70	−16	1	Advance to quarter-finals
3	Rachidatou Bilogo (BUR)	2	0	2	0	4	−4	35	84	−49	0	

Source: Yandex
(H) Host

Date	Time	Player 1	Score	Player 2	Set 1	Set 2	Set 3
13 June	10:30	Fulla Alnajjar (Syria)	2–0	(Burkina Faso) Rachidatou Bilogo	21–14	21–14	
13 June	12:00	Evgeniya Kosetskaya (Russia)	2–0	(Burkina Faso) Rachidatou Bilogo	21–4	21–3	
13 June	13:00	Evgeniya Kosetskaya (Russia)	2–0	(Syria) Fulla Alnajjar	21–7	21–5	

=== Group 2 ===
Pos	Team	Pld	W	L	GF	GA	GD	PF	PA	PD	Pts	Qualification
1	Mariia Golubeva (RUS) (H)	2	2	0	4	0	+4	84	32	+52	2	Advance to semi-finals
2	Julia Viana Vieira (BRA)	2	1	1	2	2	0	67	68	−1	1	Advance to quarter-finals
3	Ranim Alhasbani (SYR)	2	0	2	0	4	−4	33	84	−51	0	

Source: Yandex
(H) Host

Date	Time	Player 1	Score	Player 2	Set 1	Set 2	Set 3
13 June	11:00	Julia Viana Vieira (Brazil)	2–0	(Syria) Ranim Alhasbani	21–11	21–15	
13 June	12:00	Mariia Golubeva (Russia)	2–0	(Brazil) Julia Viana Vieira	21–12	21–13	
13 June	13:00	Mariia Golubeva (Russia)	2–0	(Syria) Ranim Alhasbani	21–2	21–5	

=== Group 3 ===
Pos	Team	Pld	W	L	GF	GA	GD	PF	PA	PD	Pts	Qualification
1	Sofiya Yanouskaya (BLR)	2	2	0	4	0	+4	84	60	+24	2	Advance to quarter-finals
2	Sayane Regina Lima (BRA)	2	1	1	2	3	−1	84	95	−11	1	Advance to quarter-finals
3	Galina Lisochkina (RUS) (H)	2	0	2	1	4	−3	90	103	−13	0	

Source: Yandex
(H) Host

Date	Time	Player 1	Score	Player 2	Set 1	Set 2	Set 3
13 June	11:00	Sofiya Yanouskaya (Belarus)	2–0	(Russia) Galina Lisochkina	21–18	21–19	
13 June	12:00	Sayane Regina Lima (Brazil)	2–1	(Russia) Galina Lisochkina	18–21	22–20	21–18
13 June	13:00	Sofiya Yanouskaya (Belarus)	2–0	(Brazil) Sayane Regina Lima	21–13	21–10	

== Finals ==
The knockout stage was played from 14 to 16 June.

Quarter-finals
Sayane Regina Lima (BRA)	21	21
Julia Viana Vieira (BRA)	12	12
Fulla Alnajjar (SYR)	7	5
Sofiya Yanouskaya (BLR)	21	21

Semi-finals
Evgeniya Kosetskaya (RUS)	21	21
Sayane Regina Lima (BRA)	13	3
Sofiya Yanouskaya (BLR)	11	10
Mariia Golubeva (RUS)	21	21

Gold medal match
Evgeniya Kosetskaya (RUS)	15	21	21
Mariia Golubeva (RUS)	21	8	13
