= Badminton at the 2024 BRICS Games – Men's singles =

Badminton event

Men's singles at the 2024 BRICS Games
- Venue: Kazan Gymnastics Center
- Dates: 13 – 16 June 2024

Medalists
| gold medal | Sergey Sirant | Russia |
| silver medal | Artur Pechenkin | Russia |
| bronze medal | Welton Menezes | Brazil |
| bronze medal | Vladislav Dobychkin | Russia |

The men's singles badminton tournament at the 2024 BRICS Games took place from 13 to 16 June 2024 at the Kazan Gymnastics Center at Kazan.

Sergey Sirant emerged as champion in the men's singles event after defeating compatriot Artur Pechenkin in the final.

== Competition format ==
Similar to the Olympics, the tournament started with a group phase round-robin followed by a knockout stage. For the group stage, the players were divided into 6 groups of between 3 and 4 players each. Each group played a round-robin. The top two players in each group advanced to the knockout rounds. The knockout stage was a four-round single elimination tournament.

Matches were played best-of-three games. Each game was played to 21, except that a player must win by 2 unless the score reaches 30–29.

== Schedule ==
The tournament was held over a 4-day period.

Legend

| P | Preliminaries | R | Round of 16 | QF | Quarter-finals | SF | Semi-finals | M | Medal matches |

| Date | 13 Jun | 14 Jun | | 15 Jun | 16 Jun |
|---|---|---|---|---|---|
| Men's singles | P | R | QF | SF | M |

== Group stage ==
The group stage was played on 13 June. The winner and runner-up of each group advanced to the knockout rounds.

=== Group 1 ===
| Pos | Team | Pld | W | L | GF | GA | GD | PF | PA | PD | Pts | Qualification |
|---|---|---|---|---|---|---|---|---|---|---|---|---|
| 1 | Sergey Sirant (RUS) (H) | 2 | 2 | 0 | 4 | 0 | +4 | 84 | 30 | +54 | 2 | Advance to quarter-finals |
| 2 | Mikhail Makarav (BLR) | 2 | 1 | 1 | 2 | 2 | 0 | 62 | 48 | +14 | 1 | Advance to elimination round |
| 3 | Inamulhaq Sadiqi (AFG) | 2 | 0 | 2 | 0 | 4 | −4 | 16 | 84 | −68 | 0 | |

Source: Yandex
(H) Host

| Date | Time | Player 1 | Score | Player 2 | Set 1 | Set 2 | Set 3 |
|---|---|---|---|---|---|---|---|
| 13 June | 10:00 | Mikhail Makarav (Belarus) | 2–0 | Inamulhaq Sadiqi | 21–2 | 21–4 | |
| 13 June | 11:00 | Sergey Sirant (Russia) | 2–0 | (Belarus) Mikhail Makarav | 21–5 | 21–15 | |
| 13 June | 12:30 | Sergey Sirant (Russia) | 2–0 | Inamulhaq Sadiqi | 21–7 | 21–3 | |

=== Group 2 ===
| Pos | Team | Pld | W | L | GF | GA | GD | PF | PA | PD | Pts | Qualification |
|---|---|---|---|---|---|---|---|---|---|---|---|---|
| 1 | Artur Pechenkin (RUS) (H) | 2 | 2 | 0 | 4 | 0 | +4 | 84 | 16 | +68 | 2 | Advance to quarter-finals |
| 2 | Aboul Fatao Tapsoba (BUR) | 2 | 1 | 1 | 2 | 2 | 0 | 50 | 57 | −7 | 1 | Advance to elimination round |
| 3 | Massiré Savane (MLI) | 2 | 0 | 2 | 0 | 4 | −4 | 23 | 84 | −61 | 0 | |

Source: Yandex
(H) Host

| Date | Time | Player 1 | Score | Player 2 | Set 1 | Set 2 | Set 3 |
|---|---|---|---|---|---|---|---|
| 13 June | 10:00 | Aboul Fatao Tapsoba (Burkina Faso) | 2–0 | (Mali) Massiré Savane | 21–8 | 21–7 | |
| 13 June | 11:00 | Artur Pechenkin (Russia) | 2–0 | (Burkina Faso) Aboul Fatao Tapsoba | 21–5 | 21–3 | |
| 13 June | 12:30 | Artur Pechenkin (Russia) | 2–0 | (Mali) Massiré Savane | 21–4 | 21–4 | |

=== Group 3 ===
| Pos | Team | Pld | W | L | GF | GA | GD | PF | PA | PD | Pts | Qualification |
|---|---|---|---|---|---|---|---|---|---|---|---|---|
| 1 | Vladislav Dobychkin (RUS) (H) | 2 | 2 | 0 | 4 | 0 | +4 | 84 | 31 | +53 | 2 | Advance to quarter-finals |
| 2 | Ismail Jahid (AFG) | 2 | 1 | 1 | 2 | 3 | −1 | 71 | 93 | −22 | 1 | Advance to elimination round |
| 3 | Shadi Alasari (SYR) | 2 | 0 | 2 | 1 | 4 | −3 | 63 | 94 | −31 | 0 | |

Source: Yandex
(H) Host

| Date | Time | Player 1 | Score | Player 2 | Set 1 | Set 2 | Set 3 |
|---|---|---|---|---|---|---|---|
| 13 June | 10:00 | Vladislav Dobychkin (Russia) | 2–0 | (Syria) Shadi Alasari | 21–8 | 21–4 | |
| 13 June | 11:30 | Shadi Alasari (Syria) | 1–2 | Ismail Jahid | 21–10 | 13–21 | 17–21 |
| 13 June | 12:30 | Vladislav Dobychkin (Russia) | 2–0 | Ismail Jahid | 21–11 | 21–8 | |

=== Group 4 ===
| Pos | Team | Pld | W | L | GF | GA | GD | PF | PA | PD | Pts | Qualification |
|---|---|---|---|---|---|---|---|---|---|---|---|---|
| 1 | Pedro Taveira (BRA) | 1 | 1 | 0 | 2 | 0 | +2 | 42 | 16 | +26 | 1 | Advance to quarter-finals |
| 2 | Mohammad Sadiq Barakzai (AFG) | 2 | 1 | 1 | 2 | 1 | +1 | 80 | 92 | −12 | 1 | Advance to elimination round |
| 3 | Traoré Souleymane (MLI) | 1 | 0 | 1 | 1 | 4 | −3 | 50 | 64 | −14 | 0 | |

Source: Yandex

| Date | Time | Player 1 | Score | Player 2 | Set 1 | Set 2 | Set 3 |
|---|---|---|---|---|---|---|---|
| 13 June | 10:00 | Pedro Taveira (Brazil) | 2–0 | Mohammad Sadiq Barakzai | 21–7 | 21–9 | |
| 13 June | 11:30 | Mohammad Sadiq Barakzai | 2–1 | (Mali) Traoré Souleymane | 21–11 | 22–24 | 21–15 |
| 13 June | 12:30 | Pedro Taveira (Brazil) | N/P | (Mali) Traoré Souleymane | Cancelled | | |

=== Group 5 ===
| Pos | Team | Pld | W | L | GF | GA | GD | PF | PA | PD | Pts | Qualification |
|---|---|---|---|---|---|---|---|---|---|---|---|---|
| 1 | Welton Menezes (BRA) | 3 | 3 | 0 | 6 | 0 | +6 | 126 | 48 | +78 | 3 | Advance to quarter-finals |
| 2 | Hussam Aldin Rae (SYR) | 3 | 2 | 1 | 4 | 2 | +2 | 108 | 77 | +31 | 2 | Advance to elimination round |
| 3 | Mohammad Ibrahim Jamshidi (AFG) | 3 | 1 | 2 | 2 | 4 | −2 | 79 | 101 | −22 | 1 | |
| 4 | Alfousseini Hasseye Assarki (MLI) | 3 | 0 | 3 | 0 | 6 | −6 | 39 | 126 | −87 | 0 | |

Source: Yandex

| Date | Time | Player 1 | Score | Player 2 | Set 1 | Set 2 | Set 3 |
|---|---|---|---|---|---|---|---|
| 13 June | 10:00 | Mohammad Ibrahim Jamshidi | 2–0 | (Mali) Alfousseini Hasseye Assarki | 21–10 | 21–7 | |
| 13 June | 10:30 | Welton Menezes (Brazil) | 2–0 | Mohammad Ibrahim Jamshidi | 21–8 | 21–5 | |
| 13 June | 10:30 | Hussam Aldin Rae (Syria) | 2–0 | (Mali) Alfousseini Hasseye Assarki | 21–3 | 21–8 | |
| 13 June | 11:30 | Hussam Aldin Rae (Syria) | 2–0 | Mohammad Ibrahim Jamshidi | 21–16 | 21–8 | |
| 13 June | 11:30 | Welton Menezes (Brazil) | 2–0 | (Mali) Alfousseini Hasseye Assarki | 21–7 | 21–4 | |
| 13 June | 15:00 | Welton Menezes (Brazil) | 2–0 | (Syria) Hussam Aldin Rae | 21–9 | 21–15 | |

== Finals ==
The knockout stage was played from 14 to 16 June.

Round of 16
Jahid Ismail (AFG) | 21 | 21
Elham Akbari (AFG) | 14 | 17
Welton Menezes (BRA) | 21 | 21
Aboul Fatao Tapsoba (BUR) | 6 | 15
Mikhail Makarav (BLR) | 23 | 22
Hleb Shvydkov (BLR) | 21 | 20
Hussam Aldin Rae (SYR) | 21 | 21
Mohammad Sadiq Barakzai (AFG) | 8 | 8

Quarter-finals
Sergey Sirant (RUS) | 21 | 21
Jahid Ismail (AFG) | 8 | 4
Welton Menezes (BRA) | 21 | 21
Pedro Taveira (BRA) | 17 | 12
Vladislav Dobychkin (RUS) | 21 | 21
Mikhail Makarav (BLR) | 17 | 19
Hussam Aldin Rae (SYR) | 5 | 6
Artur Pechenkin (RUS) | 21 | 21

Semi-finals
Sergey Sirant (RUS) | 21 | 21
Welton Menezes (BRA) | 4 | 10
Vladislav Dobychkin (RUS) | 15 | 7
Artur Pechenkin (RUS) | 21 | 21

Gold medal match
Sergey Sirant (RUS) | 21 | 21
Artur Pechenkin (RUS) | 14 | 13
