= 2021 World Wrestling Championships – Men's Greco-Roman 55 kg =

Wrestling competitions

Men's Greco-Roman 55 kg at the 2021 World Championships
- Venue: Nye Jordal Amfi
- Dates: 7–8 October 2021
- Competitors: 16 from 16 nations

Medalists
gold medal	Ken Matsui	Japan
silver medal	Emin Sefershaev	RWF
bronze medal	Nugzari Tsurtsumia	Georgia
bronze medal	Eldaniz Azizli	Azerbaijan

The men's Greco-Roman 55 kilograms is a competition featured at the 2021 World Wrestling Championships, and was held in Oslo, Norway on 7 and 8 October.

This Greco-Roman wrestling competition consists of a single-elimination tournament, with a repechage used to determine the winner of two bronze medals. The two finalists face off for gold and silver medals. Each wrestler who loses to one of the two finalists moves into the repechage, culminating in a pair of bronze medal matches featuring the semifinal losers each facing the remaining repechage opponent from their half of the bracket.

Each bout consists of a single round within a six-minute limit including two halves of three minutes. The wrestler who scores more points is the winner.

Ken Matsui from Japan won the gold medal after beating Emin Sefershaev from the Russian Wrestling Federation in the final 7–1. Russian wrestlers competed under a modified flag and the name "Russian Wrestling Federation" (RWF) at this competition. Matsui received the first passivity caution in the first round but managed to defend, he scored two points when Sefershaev went down after receiving the passivity caution in the second period. with being 3–1 down Sefershaev took more risks and gave up 4 more points. Nugzari Tsurtsumia of Georgia and former world champion Eldaniz Azizli from Azerbaijan shared the bronze medals.

== Results ==
Legend

- F — Won by fall

=== Main bracket ===
Round of 16
Emin Sefershaev (RWF)	3
Nugzari Tsurtsumia (GEO)	2
Marat Garipov (BRA)	0
Khorlan Zhakansha (KAZ)	9
Max Nowry (USA)	10
Sajjad Abbaspour (IRI)	1
Norayr Hakhoyan (ARM)	6
Fabian Schmitt (GER)	1
Eldaniz Azizli (AZE)	6
Koriun Sahradian (UKR)	0
Jeon Hyeok-jin (KOR)	0
Sardarbek Konushbaev (KGZ)	9
Snorre Lund (NOR)	0
Ken Matsui (JPN)	9
Sandeep (IND)	0
Ekrem Öztürk (TUR)	7

Quarterfinals
Emin Sefershaev (RWF)	5
Khorlan Zhakansha (KAZ)	1
Max Nowry (USA)	0
Norayr Hakhoyan (ARM)	9
Eldaniz Azizli (AZE)	10
Sardarbek Konushbaev (KGZ)	1
Ken Matsui (JPN)	5
Ekrem Öztürk (TUR)	5

Semifinals
Emin Sefershaev (RWF)	3
Norayr Hakhoyan (ARM)	2
Eldaniz Azizli (AZE)	1
Ken Matsui (JPN)	10^{F}

Final
Emin Sefershaev (RWF)	1
Ken Matsui (JPN)	7

=== Repechage ===
Repechage round 1
Nugzari Tsurtsumia (GEO)	9
Khorlan Zhakansha (KAZ)	0
Snorre Lund (NOR)	0
Ekrem Öztürk (TUR)	8

Bronze medals
Nugzari Tsurtsumia (GEO)	9
Norayr Hakhoyan (ARM)	0
Ekrem Öztürk (TUR)	2
Eldaniz Azizli (AZE)	5

== Final standing ==
Rank	Athlete
1st place, gold medalist(s)	Ken Matsui (JPN)
2nd place, silver medalist(s)	Emin Sefershaev (RWF)
3rd place, bronze medalist(s)	Nugzari Tsurtsumia (GEO)
3rd place, bronze medalist(s)	Eldaniz Azizli (AZE)
5	Norayr Hakhoyan (ARM)
5	Ekrem Öztürk (TUR)
7	Sardarbek Konushbaev (KGZ)
8	Khorlan Zhakansha (KAZ)
9	Max Nowry (USA)
10	Fabian Schmitt (GER)
11	Sajjad Abbaspour (IRI)
12	Koriun Sahradian (UKR)
13	Sandeep (IND)
14	Marat Garipov (BRA)
15	Jeon Hyeok-jin (KOR)
16	Snorre Lund (NOR)
