= 2025 European Wrestling Championships – Men's Greco-Roman 55 kg =

Wrestling competition

Men's Greco-Roman 55 kg at the 2025 European Wrestling Championships
- Venue: X-Bionic Sphere
- Location: Bratislava, Slovakia
- Dates: 11-12 April
- Competitors: 9

Medalists
gold medal	Emin Sefershaev
silver medal	Eldaniz Azizli	Azerbaijan
bronze medal	Vakhtang Lolua	Georgia
bronze medal	Artiom Deleanu	Moldova

The men's Greco-Roman 55 kg is a competition featured at the 2025 European Wrestling Championships, and was held in Bratislava, Slovakia on April 11 and 12.

== Results ==
Legend

- F — Won by fall

=== Main bracket ===
Round of 16
Koriun Sahradian (UKR)	1
Vakhtang Lolua (GEO)	1

Quarterfinals
Eldaniz Azizli (AZE)	9
Vakhtang Lolua (GEO)	0
Emre Mutlu (TUR)	0
Manvel Khachatryan (ARM)	9
Emin Sefershaev (UWW)	8
Arnold Megály (SVK)	0
Artiom Deleanu (MDA)	7
Denis Mihai (ROU)	1

Semifinals
Eldaniz Azizli (AZE)	5
Manvel Khachatryan (ARM)	1
Emin Sefershaev (UWW)	4
Artiom Deleanu (MDA)	1

Final
Eldaniz Azizli (AZE)	1
Emin Sefershaev (UWW)	1

=== Repechage ===
Bronze medal match
Vakhtang Lolua (GEO)	8
Manvel Khachatryan (ARM)	1
Arnold Megály (SVK)	0
Artiom Deleanu (MDA)	8

== Final standing ==
Rank	Athlete
1st place, gold medalist(s)	Emin Sefershaev (UWW)
2nd place, silver medalist(s)	Eldaniz Azizli (AZE)
3rd place, bronze medalist(s)	Vakhtang Lolua (GEO)
3rd place, bronze medalist(s)	Artiom Deleanu (MDA)
5	Manvel Khachatryan (ARM)
5	Arnold Megály (SVK)
7	Koriun Sahradian (UKR)
8	Denis Mihai (ROU)
9	Emre Mutlu (TUR)
