= 2026 World Wrestling Championships – Men's Greco-Roman 55 kg =

Men's Greco-Roman 55 kg at the 2026 World Championships
- Venue: Barys Arena
- Dates: 24–25 October 2026
- Competitors: 23 from 23 nations

Medalists
gold medal	Eldaniz Azizli	Azerbaijan
silver medal	Payam Ahmadi	Iran
bronze medal	Vakhtang Lolua	Georgia
bronze medal	Iskhar Kurbayev	Kazakhstan

The men's Greco-Roman 55 kilograms is a competition featured at the 2026 World Wrestling Championships, and was held in Astana, Kazakhstan on 24 and 25 October 2026.

This Greco-Roman wrestling competition consists of a single-elimination tournament, with a repechage used to determine the winner of two bronze medals. The two finalists face off for gold and silver medals. Each wrestler who loses to one of the two finalists moves into the repechage, culminating in a pair of bronze medal matches, featuring the semifinal losers each facing the remaining repechage opponent from their half of the bracket.

== Results ==
Legend

- F — Won by fall

=== Final ===
Final
Eldaniz Azizli (AZE)	3
Payam Ahmadi (IRI)	1

=== Top half ===
Round of 32
Kutman Kalbaev (KGZ)	8
Koriun Sahradian (UKR)	0
Mönkh-Erdeniin Davaabandi (MGL)	8
Stefan Grigorov (BUL)	0
Denis Mihai (ROU)	0
Aleksandr Gurev (BLR)	3^{F}

Round of 16
Vakhtang Lolua (GEO)	2
Norayr Hakhoyan (ARM)	1
Kutman Kalbaev (KGZ)	1
Emin Sefershaev (RUS)	11
Eldaniz Azizli (AZE)	9
Mönkh-Erdeniin Davaabandi (MGL)	0
Aleksandr Gurev (BLR)	2^{F}
Shi Huoying (CHN)	7

Quarterfinals
Vakhtang Lolua (GEO)	6
Emin Sefershaev (RUS)	2
Eldaniz Azizli (AZE)	8
Aleksandr Gurev (BLR)	0

Semifinals
Vakhtang Lolua (GEO)	1
Eldaniz Azizli (AZE)	5

=== Bottom half ===
Round of 32
Nazarmamad Rakhmonbekov (TJK)	2
Max Nowry (USA)	11
Ömer Halis Recep (TUR)	9
Marat Garipov (BRA)	0
Filip Bartošík (CZE)	0
Kim Jong-hyeon (KOR)	8
Kagetora Okamoto (JPN)	2
Iskhar Kurbayev (KAZ)	5

Round of 16
Payam Ahmadi (IRI)	10
Max Nowry (USA)	1
Ömer Halis Recep (TUR)	7
Lalit Sehrawat (IND)	9
Artiom Deleanu (MDA)	11
Kim Jong-hyeon (KOR)	0
Iskhar Kurbayev (KAZ)	2
Ikhtiyor Botirov (UZB)	1

Quarterfinals
Payam Ahmadi (IRI)	9
Lalit Sehrawat (IND)	0
Artiom Deleanu (MDA)	1
Iskhar Kurbayev (KAZ)	5

Semifinals
Payam Ahmadi (IRI)	7
Iskhar Kurbayev (KAZ)	1

=== Repechage ===
Repechage round 2
Mönkh-Erdeniin Davaabandi (MGL)	10
Aleksandr Gurev (BLR)	0
Max Nowry (USA)	0
Lalit Sehrawat (IND)	7

Bronze medals
Mönkh-Erdeniin Davaabandi (MGL)	0
Vakhtang Lolua (GEO)	10
Lalit Sehrawat (IND)	0
Iskhar Kurbayev (KAZ)	9

== Final standing ==
Rank	Athlete
1st place, gold medalist(s)	Eldaniz Azizli (AZE)
2nd place, silver medalist(s)	Payam Ahmadi (IRI)
3rd place, bronze medalist(s)	Vakhtang Lolua (GEO)
3rd place, bronze medalist(s)	Iskhar Kurbayev (KAZ)
5	Mönkh-Erdeniin Davaabandi (MGL)
5	Lalit Sehrawat (IND)
7	Aleksandr Gurev (BLR)
8	Ömer Halis Recep (TUR)
9	Emin Sefershaev (RUS)
10	Artiom Deleanu (MDA)
11	Max Nowry (USA)
12	Kutman Kalbaev (KGZ)
13	Kim Jong-hyeon (KOR)
14	Kagetora Okamoto (JPN)
15	Nazarmamad Rakhmonbekov (TJK)
16	Ikhtiyor Botirov (UZB)
17	Norayr Hakhoyan (ARM)
18	Shi Huoying (CHN)
19	Denis Mihai (ROU)
20	Koriun Sahradian (UKR)
21	Stefan Grigorov (BUL)
22	Filip Bartošík (CZE)
23	Marat Garipov (BRA)
