= 2022 U23 World Wrestling Championships – Men's Greco-Roman 55 kg =

Wrestling competitions

Men's Greco-Roman 55 kg at the 2022 U23 World Championships
- Venue: Pontevedra Municipal Sports Hall
- Dates: 17–18 October
- Competitors: 14 from 14 nations

Medalists
gold medal	Pouya Dadmarz	Iran
silver medal	Nihad Guluzade	Azerbaijan
bronze medal	Ahmet Taşkınoğlu	Turkey
bronze medal	Giorgi Tokhadze	Georgia

The men's Greco-Roman 55 kilograms is a competition featured at the 2022 U23 World Wrestling Championships, and was held in Pontevedra, Spain on 17 and 18 October 2022. The qualification rounds were held on 17 October while medal matches were held on the 2nd day of the competition. A total of 14 wrestlers competed in this event, limited to athletes whose body weight was less than 55 kilograms.

This Greco-Roman wrestling competition consists of a single-elimination tournament, with a repechage used to determine the winner of two bronze medals. The two finalists face off for gold and silver medals. Each wrestler who loses to one of the two finalists moves into the repechage, culminating in a pair of bronze medal matches featuring the semifinal losers each facing the remaining repechage opponent from their half of the bracket.

== Results ==
Legend

- F — Won by fall

=== Main bracket ===
Round of 16
Denis Mihai (ROU)	8
Mykola Havrychkin (UKR)	4
Pouya Dadmarz (IRI)	3
Ahmet Taşkınoğlu (TUR)	1
Nurzat Kabdyrakhimov (KAZ)	10
James Castaño (ESP)	1
Ken Matsui (JPN)	18
Taalaibek Beishenbek Uulu (KGZ)	10
Abduwali Rahimbaýew (TKM)	5
Camden Russell (USA)	11
Artiom Deleanu (MDA)	11
Giorgi Tokhadze (GEO)	15

Quarterfinals
Ilias Zairakis (GRE)	0
Denis Mihai (ROU)	10
Pouya Dadmarz (IRI)	8
Nurzat Kabdyrakhimov (KAZ)	1
Ken Matsui (JPN)	8
Camden Russell (USA)	2
Giorgi Tokhadze (GEO)	7
Nihad Guluzade (AZE)	9

Semifinals
Denis Mihai (ROU)	4
Pouya Dadmarz (IRI)	9
Ken Matsui (JPN)	0
Nihad Guluzade (AZE)	8

Final
Pouya Dadmarz (IRI)	5
Nihad Guluzade (AZE)	1

=== Repechage ===
Repechage round
Ahmet Taşkınoğlu (TUR)	7
Nurzat Kabdyrakhimov (KAZ)	6

Bronze medals
Ahmet Taşkınoğlu (TUR)	8
Denis Mihai (ROU)	3
Giorgi Tokhadze (GEO)	8
Ken Matsui (JPN)	0

== Final standing ==
Rank	Athlete
1st place, gold medalist(s)	Pouya Dadmarz (IRI)
2nd place, silver medalist(s)	Nihad Guluzade (AZE)
3rd place, bronze medalist(s)	Ahmet Taşkınoğlu (TUR)
3rd place, bronze medalist(s)	Giorgi Tokhadze (GEO)
5	Denis Mihai (ROU)
5	Ken Matsui (JPN)
7	Nurzat Kabdyrakhimov (KAZ)
8	Camden Russell (USA)
9	Artiom Deleanu (MDA)
10	Taalaibek Beishenbek Uulu (KGZ)
11	Abduwali Rahimbaýew (TKM)
12	Mykola Havrychkin (UKR)
13	James Castaño (ESP)
14	Ilias Zairakis (GRE)
