= Eldaniz Azizli =

Azerbaijani sport wrestler (born 1992)

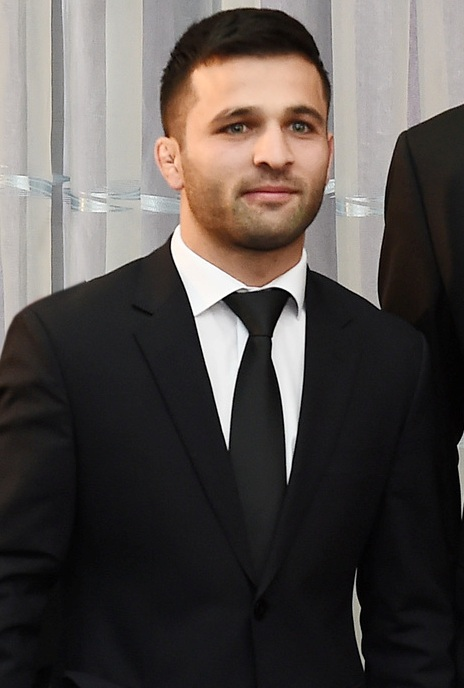
- Eldaniz Azizli in 2024

Personal information
- Born: April 20, 1992 (age 34) Beylagan District, Azerbaijan
- Height: 1.62 m (5 ft 4 in)

Sport
- Country: Azerbaijan
- Sport: Wrestling
- Event: Greco-Roman
Medal record
Men's Greco-Roman wrestling
Representing Azerbaijan
World Championships
Gold medal – first place	2018 Budapest	55 kg
Gold medal – first place	2022 Belgrade	55 kg
Gold medal – first place	2023 Belgrade	55 kg
Gold medal – first place	2024 Tirana	55 kg
Gold medal – first place	2026 Astana	55 kg
Bronze medal – third place	2019 Nur-Sultan	55 kg
Bronze medal – third place	2021 Oslo	55 kg
Bronze medal – third place	2025 Zagreb	55 kg
European Championships
Gold medal – first place	2018 Kaspiysk	55 kg
Gold medal – first place	2022 Budapest	55 kg
Silver medal – second place	2023 Zagreb	55 kg
Silver medal – second place	2025 Bratislava	55 kg
Bronze medal – third place	2011 Dortmund	55 kg
Bronze medal – third place	2019 Bucharest	55 kg
Bronze medal – third place	2020 Rome	55 kg
Bronze medal – third place	2021 Warsaw	55 kg
World Cup
Gold medal – first place	2013 Tehran	55 kg
Silver medal – second place	2022 Baku	Team
Individual World Cup
Bronze medal – third place	2020 Belgrade	55 kg
Islamic Solidarity Games
Gold medal – first place	2021 Konya	55 kg
Vehbi Emre & Hamit Kaplan Tournament
Silver medal – second place	2011 Istanbul	55 kg
Golden Grand Prix
Bronze medal – third place	2011 Baku	55 kg
Bronze medal – third place	2013 Baku	59 kg
Bronze medal – third place	2015 Baku	55 kg
Grand Prix
Silver medal – second place	2022 Rome	60 kg
Gold medal – first place	2024 Budapest	55 kg
Universiade
Bronze medal – third place	2013 Kazan	55 kg
European U23 Championship
Bronze medal – third place	2015 Walbrzych	59 kg
World Juniors Championships
Gold medal – first place	2010 Budapest	50 kg
Gold medal – first place	2012 Pattaya	55 kg
Bronze medal – third place	2011 Bucharest	55 kg
European Juniors Championships
Gold medal – first place	2010 Samokov	50 kg
Gold medal – first place	2011 Zrenjanin	55 kg
European Cadets Championships
Gold medal – first place	2007 Warsaw	42 kg
Gold medal – first place	2008 Daugavpils	46 kg
Gold medal – first place	2008 Zrenjanin	50 kg

Eldaniz Yaman oglu Azizli (Azerbaijani: Eldəniz Yəmən oğlu Əzizli) (born 20 April 1992) is an Azerbaijani wrestler competing in the 55 kg division of Greco-Roman wrestling. He is a five-time world champion (2018, 2022, 2023, 2024 and 2026) and a two-time European champion (2018 and 2022).

He won a gold medal at the 2018 World Wrestling Championships.

In 2020, he won one of the bronze medals in the men's 55 kg event at the 2020 Individual Wrestling World Cup held in Belgrade, Serbia.

In 2022, Eldaniz Azizli won the decisive fight over Nugzari Tsurtsumia (Georgia) - 8:2 and having won a gold medal, became a two-time European champion. A few months later, he won the silver medal in his event at the Matteo Pellicone Ranking Series 2022 held in Rome, Italy. He won the gold medal in his event at the 2021 Islamic Solidarity Games held in Konya, Turkey.

In 2023, he won his third world title at the 2023 World Wrestling Championships in Belgrade, Serbia, defeating Nugzari Tsurtsumia of Georgia 14–4 in the final. The following year, he won the gold medal at the 2024 World Wrestling Championships in Tirana, Albania, beating Pouya Dadmarz of Iran in the final on criteria after a 1–1 bout, and became the first Azerbaijani wrestler to win four world titles.

In 2025, he won the silver medal in the 55 kg event at the 2025 European Wrestling Championships in Bratislava, Slovakia, after losing to Emin Sefershaev in the final. At the 2025 World Wrestling Championships in Zagreb, Croatia, he lost his semifinal to Payam Ahmadi of Iran and then defeated Ulan Muradbek Uulu of Kyrgyzstan 9–0 in the bronze medal match, earning his seventh world championship medal.

Before the 2026 World Wrestling Championships in Astana, Kazakhstan, Azizli said he intended to end his competitive career after the tournament. He defeated the reigning world champion Vakhtang Lolua of Georgia 5–1 in the semifinal and beat Payam Ahmadi 3–1 in the final on 25 October 2026 to become a five-time world champion.

As of April 1, 2026, with a score of 320 points, holds tenth place in the ranking of Azerbaijani athletes according to the Ministry of Youth and Sports.
