= 2025 World Wrestling Championships – Men's Greco-Roman 55 kg =

Wrestling competitions

Men's Greco-Roman 55 kg at the 2025 World Championships
- Venue: Arena Zagreb
- Dates: 18–19 September 2025
- Competitors: 18 from 18 nations

Medalists
gold medal	Vakhtang Lolua	Georgia
silver medal	Payam Ahmadi	Iran
bronze medal	Eldaniz Azizli	Azerbaijan
bronze medal	Shi Huoying	China

The men's Greco-Roman 55 kilograms is a competition featured at the 2025 World Wrestling Championships, and was held in Zagreb, Croatia on 18 and 19 September 2025.

This Greco-Roman wrestling competition consists of a single-elimination tournament, with a repechage used to determine the winner of two bronze medals. The two finalists face off for gold and silver medals. Each wrestler who loses to one of the two finalists moves into the repechage, culminating in a pair of bronze medal matches, featuring the semifinal losers each facing the remaining repechage opponent from their half of the bracket.

== Results ==
Legend

- F — Won by fall

=== Final ===
Final
Payam Ahmadi (IRI)	7
Vakhtang Lolua (GEO)	9

=== Top half ===
Round of 32
Jayden Raney (USA)	2
Koriun Sahradian (UKR)	1

Round of 16
Eldaniz Azizli (AZE)	8
Anil Mor (IND)	0
Jayden Raney (USA)	11^{F}
Sajjad Ali (IRQ)	3
Ulan Muratbek Uulu (KGZ)	0
Payam Ahmadi (IRI)	9
Marlan Mukashev (KAZ)	11
Artiom Deleanu (MDA)	14

Quarterfinals
Eldaniz Azizli (AZE)	5
Jayden Raney (USA)	1
Payam Ahmadi (IRI)	8
Artiom Deleanu (MDA)	0

Semifinals
Eldaniz Azizli (AZE)	1
Payam Ahmadi (IRI)	3

=== Bottom half ===
Round of 32
Shi Huoying (CHN)	7
Taiga Onishi (JPN)	2

Round of 16
Manvel Khachatryan (ARM)	1
Muhammet Emin Çakır (TUR)	1
Yu Jun-sik (KOR)	1
Ikhtiyor Botirov (UZB)	9^{F}
Vakhtang Lolua (GEO)	9
Shi Huoying (CHN)	1
Alexander Cuevas (SGP)	0
Denis Mihai (ROU)	8

Quarterfinals
Muhammet Emin Çakır (TUR)	10
Ikhtiyor Botirov (UZB)	0
Vakhtang Lolua (GEO)	3
Denis Mihai (ROU)	2

Semifinals
Muhammet Emin Çakır (TUR)	2
Vakhtang Lolua (GEO)	2

=== Repechage ===
Repechage round 2
Ulan Muratbek Uulu (KGZ)	13
Artiom Deleanu (MDA)	8
Shi Huoying (CHN)	3
Denis Mihai (ROU)	1

Bronze medals
Ulan Muratbek Uulu (KGZ)	0
Eldaniz Azizli (AZE)	9
Shi Huoying (CHN)	5
Muhammet Emin Çakır (TUR)	1

== Final standing ==
Rank	Athlete
1st place, gold medalist(s)	Vakhtang Lolua (GEO)
2nd place, silver medalist(s)	Payam Ahmadi (IRI)
3rd place, bronze medalist(s)	Eldaniz Azizli (AZE)
3rd place, bronze medalist(s)	Shi Huoying (CHN)
5	Ulan Muratbek Uulu (KGZ)
5	Muhammet Emin Çakır (TUR)
7	Jayden Raney (USA)
8	Denis Mihai (ROU)
9	Ikhtiyor Botirov (UZB)
10	Artiom Deleanu (MDA)
11	Marlan Mukashev (KAZ)
12	Taiga Onishi (JPN)
13	Manvel Khachatryan (ARM)
14	Koriun Sahradian (UKR)
15	Sajjad Ali (IRQ)
16	Yu Jun-sik (KOR)
17	Anil Mor (IND)
18	Alexander Cuevas (SGP)
