= 2024 European Wrestling Championships – Men's Greco-Roman 55 kg =

Wrestling competition

Men's Greco-Roman 55 kg at the 2024 European Wrestling Championships
- Venue: Polyvalent Hall
- Location: Bucharest, Romania
- Dates: 12-13 February
- Competitors: 9

Medalists
gold medal	Artiom Deleanu	Moldova
silver medal	Rashad Mammadov	Azerbaijan
bronze medal	Denis Mihai	Romania
bronze medal	Manvel Khachatryan	Armenia

The Men's Greco-Roman 55 kg is a competition featured at the 2024 European Wrestling Championships, and was held in Bucharest, Romania on February 12 and 13.

== Results ==
Legend

- F — Won by fall

=== Main bracket ===
1/8 finals
Amaiak Osipov (AIN)	5
Koriun Sahradian (UKR)	1

Quarterfinals
Nugzari Tsurtsumia (GEO)	4
Amaiak Osipov (AIN)	2
Rashad Mammadov (AZE)	4
Denis Mihai (ROU)	3
Adem Uzun (TUR)	5
Manvel Khachatryan (ARM)	13
Stefan Grigorov (BUL)	1
Artiom Deleanu (MDA)	5^{F}

Semifinals
Nugzari Tsurtsumia (GEO)	1
Rashad Mammadov (AZE)	5
Manvel Khachatryan (ARM)	2
Artiom Deleanu (MDA)	2

Final
Rashad Mammadov (AZE)	3
Artiom Deleanu (MDA)	5^{F}

=== Repechage ===
Bronze medal match
Denis Mihai (ROU)	9^{F}
Nugzari Tsurtsumia (GEO)	0
Stefan Grigorov (BUL)	0
Manvel Khachatryan (ARM)	8

== Final standing ==
Rank	Athlete
1st place, gold medalist(s)	Artiom Deleanu (MDA)
2nd place, silver medalist(s)	Rashad Mammadov (AZE)
3rd place, bronze medalist(s)	Denis Mihai (ROU)
3rd place, bronze medalist(s)	Manvel Khachatryan (ARM)
5	Nugzari Tsurtsumia (GEO)
5	Stefan Grigorov (BUL)
7	Amaiak Osipov (AIN)
8	Adem Uzun (TUR)
9	Koriun Sahradian (UKR)
