= 2022 European Wrestling Championships – Men's Greco-Roman 55 kg =

Wrestling competition

Men's Greco-Roman 55 kg at the 2022 European Wrestling Championships
- Venue: BOK Sports Hall
- Location: Budapest, Hungary
- Dates: 1-2 April
- Competitors: 10

Medalists
gold medal	Eldaniz Azizli	Azerbaijan
silver medal	Nugzari Tsurtsumia	Georgia
bronze medal	Rudik Mkrtchyan	Armenia
bronze medal	Emre Mutlu	Turkey

The Men's Greco-Roman 55 kg is a competition featured at the 2022 European Wrestling Championships, and was held in Budapest, Hungary on April 1 and 2.

== Results ==
Legend

- F — Won by fall

=== Main Bracket ===
1/8 finals
Denis Mihai (ROU)	9
Stefan Grigorov (BUL)	4
Emre Mutlu (TUR)	12
Sebastian Kolompar (SRB)	3

Quarterfinals
Eldaniz Azizli (AZE)	8
Denis Mihai (ROU)	0
Rudik Mkrtchyan (ARM)	6
Koriun Sahradian (UKR)	5
Fabian Schmitt (GER)	1
Artiom Deleanu (MDA)	4
Emre Mutlu (TUR)	0
Nugzari Tsurtsumia (GEO)	8

Semifinals
Eldaniz Azizli (AZE)	7
Rudik Mkrtchyan (ARM)	3
Artiom Deleanu (MDA)	0
Nugzari Tsurtsumia (GEO)	9

Final
Eldaniz Azizli (AZE)	8
Nugzari Tsurtsumia (GEO)	2

=== Repechage ===
Bronze medal match
Denis Mihai (ROU)	1
Rudik Mkrtchyan (ARM)	9
Emre Mutlu (TUR)	4^{F}
Artiom Deleanu (MDA)	3

== Final standing ==
Rank	Athlete	UWW Points
1st place, gold medalist(s)	Eldaniz Azizli (AZE)	10000
2nd place, silver medalist(s)	Nugzari Tsurtsumia (GEO)	8000
3rd place, bronze medalist(s)	Rudik Mkrtchyan (ARM)	6500
3rd place, bronze medalist(s)	Emre Mutlu (TUR)	6500
5	Denis Mihai (ROU)	5000
5	Artiom Deleanu (MDA)	5000
7	Koriun Sahradian (UKR)	4400
8	Stefan Grigorov (BUL)	4000
9	Sebastian Kolompar (SRB)	3500
10	Fabian Schmitt (GER)	3100
