= 2021 U23 World Wrestling Championships – Men's Greco-Roman 55 kg =

Greco-Roman event at World Wrestling Championship

The men's Greco-Roman 55 kilograms is a competition featured at the 2021 U23 World Wrestling Championships, and was held in Belgrade, Serbia on 1 and 2 November.

== Medalists ==
Gold	Mavlud Rizmanov (RUS)
Silver	Pouya Dadmarz (IRI)
Bronze	Adem Uzun (TUR)
Bronze	Nihad Guluzade (AZE)

== Results ==
Legend

- F — Won by fall
- WO — Won by walkover

=== Final ===
Final
Mavlud Rizmanov (RUS)	3
Pouya Dadmarz (IRI)	1

=== Top half ===
Round of 32

Round of 16
Arslan Abdurakhmanov (KAZ)	6
Denis Demirov (BUL)	0
Akyikat Kulzhigit Uulu (KGZ)	9
Sebastian Kolompar (SRB)	0
Mavlud Rizmanov (RUS)	8
Bajram Sina (ALB)	0
Adem Uzun (TUR)	7
Arshad Chaudhary (IND)	1

Quarterfinals
Arslan Abdurakhmanov (KAZ)	3
Akyikat Kulzhigit Uulu (KGZ)	1
Mavlud Rizmanov (RUS)	10
Adem Uzun (TUR)	0

Semifinals
Arslan Abdurakhmanov (KAZ)	4
Mavlud Rizmanov (RUS)	13

=== Bottom half ===
Round of 32
Ikhtiyor Botirov (UZB)	1
Pouya Dadmarz (IRI)	6
Snorre Lund (NOR)	0
Denis Mihai (ROU)	8
Grzegorz Hildebrand (POL)	0
Taras Krupski (UKR)	8

Round of 16
Giorgi Tokhadze (GEO)	8
Ashot Mkhitaryan (ARM)	0
Artiom Deleanu (MDA)	1
Taylor LaMont (USA)	2
Nihad Guluzade (AZE)	1
Pouya Dadmarz (IRI)	1
Denis Mihai (ROU)	1
Taras Krupski (UKR)	3^{F}

Quarterfinals
Giorgi Tokhadze (GEO)	3
Taylor LaMont (USA)	6
Pouya Dadmarz (IRI)	9
Taras Krupski (UKR)	3

Semifinals
Taylor LaMont (USA)	1
Pouya Dadmarz (IRI)	5

=== Repechage ===
Repechage round 1
Ikhtiyor Botirov (UZB)	3
Nihad Guluzade (AZE)	7

Repechage round 2
~~Bajram Sina (ALB)~~
Adem Uzun (TUR)	WO
Nihad Guluzade (AZE)	8
Taras Krupski (UKR)	0

Bronze medals
Adem Uzun (TUR)	4^{F}
Arslan Abdurakhmanov (KAZ)	0
Nihad Guluzade (AZE)	9
Taylor LaMont (USA)	0
