= 2024 World Wrestling Championships – Men's Greco-Roman 55 kg =

Wrestling competitions

Men's Greco-Roman 55 kg at the 2024 World Championships
- Venue: Tirana Olympic Park
- Dates: 28–29 October 2024
- Competitors: 16 from 15 nations

Medalists
gold medal	Eldaniz Azizli	Azerbaijan
silver medal	Pouya Dadmarz	Iran
bronze medal	Denis Mihai	Romania
bronze medal	Emin Sefershaev

The men's Greco-Roman 55 kilograms is a competition featured at the 2024 World Wrestling Championships, and was held in Tirana, Albania on 28 and 29 October.

This Greco-Roman wrestling competition consists of a single-elimination tournament, with a repechage used to determine the winner of two bronze medals. The two finalists face off for gold and silver medals. Each wrestler who loses to one of the two finalists moves into the repechage, culminating in a pair of bronze medal matches, featuring the semifinal losers each facing the remaining repechage opponent from their half of the bracket.

Each bout consists of a single round within a six-minute limit, including two halves of three minutes. The wrestler who scores more points is the winner.

Eldaniz Azizli of Azerbaijan won his fourth world title.

== Results ==
Legend

- F — Won by fall

=== Main bracket ===
Round of 16
Eldaniz Azizli (AZE)	8
Bajram Sina (ALB)	0
Zhang Haifeng (CHN)	2
Ulan Muratbek Uulu (KGZ)	2
Brady Koontz (USA)	3
Sanjeev Redhu (IND)	5
Kagetora Okamoto (JPN)	1
Denis Mihai (ROU)	6
Artiom Deleanu (MDA)	0
Iskhar Kurbayev (KAZ)	11
Emin Sefershaev (AIN)	7
Koriun Sahradian (UKR)	0
Manvel Khachatryan (ARM)	7
Ömer Halis Recep (TUR)	4
Giorgi Tokhadze (GEO)	4
Pouya Dadmarz (IRI)	5^{F}

Quarterfinals
Eldaniz Azizli (AZE)	9
Zhang Haifeng (CHN)	0
Sanjeev Redhu (IND)	0
Denis Mihai (ROU)	9
Iskhar Kurbayev (KAZ)	1
Emin Sefershaev (AIN)	1
Manvel Khachatryan (ARM)	1
Pouya Dadmarz (IRI)	1

Semifinals
Eldaniz Azizli (AZE)	9
Denis Mihai (ROU)	0
Emin Sefershaev (AIN)	1
Pouya Dadmarz (IRI)	1

Final
Eldaniz Azizli (AZE)	1
Pouya Dadmarz (IRI)	1

=== Repechage ===
Repechage round 1
Bajram Sina (ALB)	3
Zhang Haifeng (CHN)	2^{F}
Giorgi Tokhadze (GEO)	1
Manvel Khachatryan (ARM)	9

Bronze medals
Zhang Haifeng (CHN)	5
Denis Mihai (ROU)	8
Manvel Khachatryan (ARM)	5
Emin Sefershaev (AIN)	7

== Final standing ==
Rank	Athlete
1st place, gold medalist(s)	Eldaniz Azizli (AZE)
2nd place, silver medalist(s)	Pouya Dadmarz (IRI)
3rd place, bronze medalist(s)	Denis Mihai (ROU)
3rd place, bronze medalist(s)	Emin Sefershaev (AIN)
5	Zhang Haifeng (CHN)
5	Manvel Khachatryan (ARM)
7	Iskhar Kurbayev (KAZ)
8	Sanjeev Redhu (IND)
9	Giorgi Tokhadze (GEO)
10	Ömer Halis Recep (TUR)
11	Brady Koontz (USA)
12	Ulan Muratbek Uulu (KGZ)
13	Kagetora Okamoto (JPN)
14	Bajram Sina (ALB)
15	Koriun Sahradian (UKR)
16	Artiom Deleanu (MDA)
