= 2019 World Wrestling Championships – Men's Greco-Roman 55 kg =

Men's Greco-Roman 55 kg at the 2019 World Championships
- Venue: Barys Arena
- Dates: 14–15 September 2019
- Competitors: 20 from 20 nations

Medalists
gold medal	Nugzari Tsurtsumia	Georgia
silver medal	Khorlan Zhakansha	Kazakhstan
bronze medal	Eldaniz Azizli	Azerbaijan
bronze medal	Shota Ogawa	Japan

The men's Greco-Roman 55 kilograms is a competition featured at the 2019 World Wrestling Championships, and was held in Nur-Sultan, Kazakhstan on 14 and 15 September.

This Greco-Roman wrestling competition consists of a single-elimination tournament, with a repechage used to determine the winner of two bronze medals. The two finalists face off for gold and silver medals. Each wrestler who loses to one of the two finalists moves into the repechage, culminating in a pair of bronze medal matches featuring the semifinal losers each facing the remaining repechage opponent from their half of the bracket.

== Results ==
Legend

- F — Won by fall

=== Final ===
Final
Khorlan Zhakansha (KAZ)	0
Nugzari Tsurtsumia (GEO)	9

=== Top half ===
Round of 32

Round of 16
Eldaniz Azizli (AZE)	8
Manjeet Chahar (IND)	0
Mönkh-Erdeniin Davaabandi (MGL)	7^{F}
Sebastian Kolompar (SRB)	2
Fabian Schmitt (GER)	1
Max Nowry (USA)	10
Khorlan Zhakansha (KAZ)	9
Abdelkarim Fergat (ALG)	5

Quarterfinals
Eldaniz Azizli (AZE)	9
Mönkh-Erdeniin Davaabandi (MGL)	0
Max Nowry (USA)	2
Khorlan Zhakansha (KAZ)	3

Semifinals
Eldaniz Azizli (AZE)	5
Khorlan Zhakansha (KAZ)	11

=== Bottom half ===
Round of 32
Asan Sulaimanov (KGZ)	0
Vitali Kabaloev (RUS)	9
Shota Ogawa (JPN)	7
Norayr Hakhoyan (ARM)	3
Jeon Hyeok-jin (KOR)	4
Sargis Khachatryan (BRA)	2
Pouya Nasserpour (IRI)	8
Şerif Kılıç (TUR)	0

Round of 16
Nugzari Tsurtsumia (GEO)	9
Cao Liguo (CHN)	0
Viktor Petryk (UKR)	3
Vitali Kabaloev (RUS)	6
Shota Ogawa (JPN)	8
Jeon Hyeok-jin (KOR)	0
Pouya Nasserpour (IRI)	0
Ilkhom Bakhromov (UZB)	10

Quarterfinals
Nugzari Tsurtsumia (GEO)	8
Vitali Kabaloev (RUS)	3
Shota Ogawa (JPN)	4
Ilkhom Bakhromov (UZB)	2

Semifinals
Nugzari Tsurtsumia (GEO)	8
Shota Ogawa (JPN)	0

=== Repechage ===
Repechage round 2
Abdelkarim Fergat (ALG)	3
Max Nowry (USA)	11
Cao Liguo (CHN)	5^{F}
Vitali Kabaloev (RUS)	4

Bronze medals
Max Nowry (USA)	0
Eldaniz Azizli (AZE)	8
Cao Liguo (CHN)	2
Shota Ogawa (JPN)	11
