= 2023 U23 World Wrestling Championships – Men's Greco-Roman 55 kg =

Wrestling competitions

Men's Greco-Roman 55 kg at the 2023 U23 World Championships
- Venue: Tirana Olympic Park
- Dates: 28–29 October
- Competitors: 17 from 14 nations

Medalists
gold medal	Giorgi Tokhadze	Georgia
silver medal	Iskhar Kurbayev	Kazakhstan
bronze medal	Farid Sadikhli	Azerbaijan
bronze medal	Adem Uzun	Turkey

The men's Greco-Roman 55 kilograms is a competition featured at the 2023 U23 World Wrestling Championships, and was held in Tirana, Albania on 28 and 29 October 2023.

This Greco-Roman wrestling competition consists of a single-elimination tournament, with a repechage used to determine the winner of two bronze medals. The two finalists face off for gold and silver medals. Each wrestler who loses to one of the two finalists moves into the repechage, culminating in a pair of bronze medal matches featuring the semifinal losers each facing the remaining repechage opponent from their half of the bracket.

== Results ==
Legend

- F — Won by fall
- WO — Won by walkover

=== Final ===
Final
Iskhar Kurbayev (KAZ)	0
Giorgi Tokhadze (GEO)	9

=== Top half ===
Round of 32
Laishram Metei (UWW)	0
Manvel Khachatryan (ARM)	9

Round of 16
Iskhar Kurbayev (KAZ)	9
Yevhen Pokovba (UKR)	1
Manvel Khachatryan (ARM)	8
Denis Demirov (BUL)	0
Adem Uzun (TUR)	9
Andi Muça (ALB)	0
Hassan Al-Harthi (KSA)	5
Camden Russell (USA)	8^{F}

Quarterfinals
Iskhar Kurbayev (KAZ)	9
Manvel Khachatryan (ARM)	1
Adem Uzun (TUR)	8
Camden Russell (USA)	0

Semifinals
Iskhar Kurbayev (KAZ)	9
Adem Uzun (TUR)	1

=== Bottom half ===
Round of 32

Round of 16
Shoya Ito (JPN)	4
Ulan Muratbek Uulu (KGZ)	6
Giorgi Tokhadze (GEO)	8
Denis Mihai (ROU)	0
Maksim Stupakevich (ANA)	3
Farid Sadikhli (AZE)	3
Vladimir Zabeyvorota (ANA)	9
Leonid Moroz (MDA)	0

Quarterfinals
Ulan Muratbek Uulu (KGZ)	2
Giorgi Tokhadze (GEO)	11
Farid Sadikhli (AZE)	4
Vladimir Zabeyvorota (ANA)	3

Semifinals
Giorgi Tokhadze (GEO)	10
Farid Sadikhli (AZE)	0

=== Repechage ===
Repechage round 2
Yevhen Pokovba (UKR)	2
Manvel Khachatryan (ARM)	3
Denis Mihai (ROU)	WO
Ulan Muratbek Uulu (KGZ)

Bronze medals
Manvel Khachatryan (ARM)	0
Adem Uzun (TUR)	10
Denis Mihai (ROU)	0
Farid Sadikhli (AZE)	10
