= 2023 European Wrestling Championships – Men's Greco-Roman 55 kg =

Wrestling competition

Men's Greco-Roman 55 kg at the 2023 European Wrestling Championships
- Venue: Arena Zagreb
- Location: Zagreb, Croatia
- Dates: 21-22 April
- Competitors: 9

Medalists
| gold medal | Adem Uzun | Turkey |
| silver medal | Eldaniz Azizli | Azerbaijan |
| bronze medal | Denis Mihai | Romania |
| bronze medal | Nugzari Tsurtsumia | Georgia |

The Men's Greco-Roman 55 kg is a competition featured at the 2023 European Wrestling Championships, and will held in Zagreb, Croatia on April 21 and 22.

== Results ==
Legend

- F — Won by fall

=== Final ===
1/8 finals
Artiom Deleanu (MDA) | 0
Stefan Grigorov (BUL) | 9

Quarterfinals
Eldaniz Azizli (AZE) | 9
Stefan Grigorov (BUL) | 0
Denis Mihai (ROU) | 8
Fabian Schmitt (GER) | 0
Rudik Mkrtchyan (ARM) | 3
Adem Uzun (TUR) | 12
Viacheslav Bairaktar (UKR) | 0
Nugzari Tsurtsumia (GEO) | 10

Semifinals
Eldaniz Azizli (AZE) | 9
Denis Mihai (ROU) | 1
Adem Uzun (TUR) | 13
Nugzari Tsurtsumia (GEO) | 3

Final
Eldaniz Azizli (AZE) | 3
Adem Uzun (TUR) | 11

Bronze medal match
Stefan Grigorov (BUL) | 1
Denis Mihai (ROU) | 7
Rudik Mkrtchyan (ARM) | 0
Nugzari Tsurtsumia (GEO) | 9

== Final standing ==
| Rank | Athlete |
|---|---|
| 1st place, gold medalist(s) | Adem Uzun (TUR) |
| 2nd place, silver medalist(s) | Eldaniz Azizli (AZE) |
| 3rd place, bronze medalist(s) | Denis Mihai (ROU) |
| 3rd place, bronze medalist(s) | Nugzari Tsurtsumia (GEO) |
| 5 | Rudik Mkrtchyan (ARM) |
| 5 | Stefan Grigorov (BUL) |
| 7 | Fabian Schmitt (GER) |
| 8 | Artiom Deleanu (MDA) |
| 9 | Viacheslav Bairaktar (UKR) |
