= 2026 European Wrestling Championships – Men's Greco-Roman 55 kg =

Wrestling competition held in Tirana, Albania

Men's Greco-Roman 55 kg at the 2026 European Wrestling Championships
- Venue: Tirana Olympic Park
- Location: Tirana, Albania
- Dates: 20–21 April
- Competitors: 9 from 8 nations

Medalists
| gold medal | Emin Sefershaev |
| silver medal | Vakhtang Lolua | Georgia |
| bronze medal | Stefan Grigorov | Bulgaria |
| bronze medal | Rashad Mammadov | Azerbaijan |

The men's Greco-Roman 55 kilograms competition at the 2026 European Wrestling Championships was held from 20 to 21 April 2026 at the Tirana Olympic Park in Tirana, Albania.

== Results ==
Legend

- F — Won by fall

=== Main bracket ===
Round of 16
Leonid Moroz (MDA) | 1
Stefan Grigorov (BUL) | 5

Quarterfinals
Vakhtang Lolua (GEO) | 9
Stefan Grigorov (BUL) | 0
Ivan Stefanskyi (UKR) | 3
Manvel Khachatryan (ARM) | 7
Emin Sefershaev (UWW) | 3
Rashad Mammadov (AZE) | 0
Adalberto Minazzi (ITA) | 0
Ömer Halis Recep (TUR) | 10

Semifinals
Vakhtang Lolua (GEO) | 3
Manvel Khachatryan (ARM) | 1
Emin Sefershaev (UWW) | 11
Ömer Halis Recep (TUR) | 0

Final
Vakhtang Lolua (GEO) | 1
Emin Sefershaev (UWW) | 2

=== Repechage ===
Bronze medal matches
Stefan Grigorov (BUL) | 3
Manvel Khachatryan (ARM) | 1
Rashad Mammadov (AZE) | 8
Ömer Halis Recep (TUR) | 0

== Final standing ==
| Rank | Wrestler |
|---|---|
| 1st place, gold medalist(s) | Emin Sefershaev (UWW) |
| 2nd place, silver medalist(s) | Vakhtang Lolua (GEO) |
| 3rd place, bronze medalist(s) | Stefan Grigorov (BUL) |
| 3rd place, bronze medalist(s) | Rashad Mammadov (AZE) |
| 5 | Manvel Khachatryan (ARM) |
| 5 | Ömer Halis Recep (TUR) |
| 7 | Ivan Stefanskyi (UKR) |
| 8 | Leonid Moroz (MDA) |
| 9 | Adalberto Minazzi (ITA) |
