= 2020 Individual Wrestling World Cup – Men's Greco-Roman 55 kg =

The Men's Greco-Roman 55 kg is a competition featured at the 2020 Individual Wrestling World Cup, and was held in Belgrade, Serbia on 12 and 13 December 2020.

== Medalists ==
Gold	Emin Sefershaev; Russia
Silver	Şerif Kılıç; Turkey
Bronze	Abdelkarim Fergat; Algeria
Bronze	Eldaniz Azizli; Azerbaijan

== Results ==
Legend

- F — Won by fall
- WO — Won by walkover

1/8 finals
Cristian Vagiunic (ROU)	6
Şerif Kılıç (TUR)	7
Balbai Dordokov (KGZ)	6
Vladyslav Kuzko (UKR)	0
Arjun Halakurki (IND)	WO
~~André Silva (POR)~~
Sebastian Kolompar (SRB)	0
Eldaniz Azizli (AZE)	9
Rudik Mkrtchyan (ARM)	0
Emin Sefershaev (RUS)	4

Quarterfinals
Artiom Deleanu (MDA)	6
Nedyalko Petrov (BUL)	6
Abdelkarim Fergat (ALG)	0
Şerif Kılıç (TUR)	10
Balbai Dordokov (KGZ)	10
Arjun Halakurki (IND)	5
Eldaniz Azizli (AZE)	1
Emin Sefershaev (RUS)	9

Semifinals
Artiom Deleanu (MDA)	0
Şerif Kılıç (TUR)	10
Balbai Dordokov (KGZ)	0
Emin Sefershaev (RUS)	9

Final
Şerif Kılıç (TUR)	0
Emin Sefershaev (RUS)	8

Repechage round 1
Cristian Vagiunic (ROU)	5
Abdelkarim Fergat (ALG)	14
Rudik Mkrtchyan (ARM)	0
Eldaniz Azizli (AZE)	9

Bronze medals
Abdelkarim Fergat (ALG)	6
Artiom Deleanu (MDA)	4
Eldaniz Azizli (AZE)	3
Balbai Dordokov (KGZ)	0
