= 2019 European Wrestling Championships – Men's Greco-Roman 55 kg =

The Men's Greco-Roman 55 kg is a competition featured at the 2019 European Wrestling Championships, and was held in Bucharest, Romania on April 12 and April 13.

== Medalists ==
Gold	Vitalii Kabaloev; Russia
Silver	Florin Tița; Romania
Bronze	Fabian Schmitt; Germany
Bronze	Eldaniz Azizli; Azerbaijan

== Results ==
Legend

- F — Won by fall

=== Main Bracket ===
1/8 finals
Nugzari Tsurtsumia (GEO)	5
Rudik Mkrtchyan (ARM)	2
Eldaniz Azizli (AZE)	9
Sebastian Kolompar (SRB)	0
Vladyslav Korostelov (UKR)	4
Nedyalko Petrov (BUL)	4
Şerif Kiliç (TUR)	4
Vitalii Kabaloev (RUS)	5

Quarterfinals
Florin Tița (ROU)	12
Fabian Schmitt (GER)	4
József Andrási (HUN)	0
Anders Rønningen (NOR)	9
Nugzari Tsurtsumia (GEO)	0
Eldaniz Azizli (AZE)	9
Vladyslav Korostelov (UKR)	0
Vitalii Kabaloev (RUS)	8

Semifinals
Florin Tița (ROU)	5
Anders Rønningen (NOR)	4
Eldaniz Azizli (AZE)	5
Vitalii Kabaloev (RUS)	7

Final
Florin Tița (ROU)	0
Vitalii Kabaloev (RUS)	11^{F}

=== Repechage ===
Repechage round 1
Şerif Kiliç (TUR)	10
Vladyslav Korostelov (UKR)	1

Bronze medal match
Fabian Schmitt (GER)	2
Anders Rønningen (NOR)	1
Şerif Kiliç (TUR)	0
Eldaniz Azizli (AZE)	8
