= 2021 European Wrestling Championships – Men's Greco-Roman 55 kg =

Wrestling competition

The Men's Greco-Roman 55 kg is a competition featured at the 2021 European Wrestling Championships, and was held in Warsaw, Poland on April 23 and April 24.

== Medalists ==
Gold	Emin Sefershaev; Russia
Silver	Ekrem Öztürk; Turkey
Bronze	Rudik Mkrtchyan; Armenia
Bronze	Eldaniz Azizli; Azerbaijan

== Results ==
Legend

- F — Won by fall

1/8 finals
Nedyalko Petrov (BUL)	4
Eldaniz Azizli (AZE)	12
Nugzari Tsurtsumia (GEO)	10
Teodor Horătău (ROU)	0
Fabian Schmitt (GER)	1
Emin Sefershaev (RUS)	8
Mattias Poutanen (FIN)	5
Sebastian Kolompar (SRB)	0

Quarterfinals
Rudik Mkrtchyan (ARM)	4
Ekrem Öztürk (TUR)	5
Mykhaylo Stupin (UKR)	3
Artsiom Katsar (BLR)	6
Eldaniz Azizli (AZE)	10
Nugzari Tsurtsumia (GEO)	1
Emin Sefershaev (RUS)	7
Mattias Poutanen (FIN)	0

Semifinals
Ekrem Öztürk (TUR)	8
Artsiom Katsar (BLR)	0
Eldaniz Azizli (AZE)	4
Emin Sefershaev (RUS)	5

Final
Ekrem Öztürk (TUR)	0
Emin Sefershaev (RUS)	7

Repechage round 1
Fabian Schmitt (GER)	3
Mattias Poutanen (FIN)	2

Bronze medal match
Rudik Mkrtchyan (ARM)	8
Artsiom Katsar (BLR)	0
Fabian Schmitt (GER)	0
Eldaniz Azizli (AZE)	8

== Final standing ==
Rank	Athlete
1st place, gold medalist(s)	Emin Sefershaev (RUS)
2nd place, silver medalist(s)	Ekrem Öztürk (TUR)
3rd place, bronze medalist(s)	Rudik Mkrtchyan (ARM)
3rd place, bronze medalist(s)	Eldaniz Azizli (AZE)
5	Artsiom Katsar (BLR)
5	Fabian Schmitt (GER)
7	Nugzari Tsurtsumia (GEO)
8	Mattias Poutanen (FIN)
9	Nedyalko Petrov (BUL)
10	Mykhaylo Stupin (UKR)
11	Sebastian Kolompar (SRB)
12	Teodor Horătău (ROU)
