= Florin Tița =

Romanian Greco-Roman wrestler

Sport
- Country: Romania
- Sport: Amateur wrestling
- Weight class: 55 kg
- Event: Greco-Roman
Medal record
Men's Greco-Roman wrestling
Representing Romania
European Championships
Silver medal – second place	2019 Bucharest	55 kg
Grand Prix
Silver medal – second place	2022 Rome	55 kg
European U23 Championship
Bronze medal – third place	2018 Istanbul	55 kg

Florin Tița is a Romanian Greco-Roman wrestler. He won the silver medal in the 55 kg event at the 2019 European Wrestling Championships held in Bucharest, Romania. In the final, he lost against Vitali Kabaloev of Russia.

== Career ==
In 2018, he won one of the bronze medals in the men's 55 kg event at the European U23 Wrestling Championship held in Istanbul, Turkey. In 2020, he lost his bronze medal match in the 55 kg event at the 2020 European Wrestling Championships in Rome, Italy.

In 2022, he won the silver medal in his event at the Matteo Pellicone Ranking Series 2022 held in Rome, Italy.

== Major results ==
Year	Tournament	Location	Result	Event
2019	European Championships	Bucharest, Romania	2nd	Greco-Roman 55 kg
