= 2018 European Wrestling Championships – Men's Greco-Roman 55 kg =

The Men's Greco-Roman 55 kg is a competition featured at the 2018 European Wrestling Championships, and was held in Kaspiysk, Russia on April 30 and May 1.

== Medalists ==
Gold	Eldaniz Azizli; Azerbaijan
Silver	Helary Mägisalu; Estonia
Bronze	Ekrem Öztürk; Turkey
Bronze	Nugzari Tsurtsumia; Georgia

== Results ==
Legend

- F — Won by fall

=== Main Bracket ===
Quarterfinals		Semifinals		Final
Ekrem Öztürk (TUR)	9
Sandro Frankol (CRO)	0	Ekrem Öztürk (TUR)	4
Nedyalko Petrov (BUL)	2	Helary Mägisalu (EST)	4
Helary Mägisalu (EST)	3			Helary Mägisalu (EST)	0
Nugzari Tsurtsumia (GEO)	0			Eldaniz Azizli (AZE)	8
Eldaniz Azizli (AZE)	9	Eldaniz Azizli (AZE)	9
Vladyslav Korostelov (UKR)	0	Vasily Topoev (RUS)	7
Vasily Topoev (RUS)	9

=== Repechage ===
Bronze medal match
Nedyalko Petrov (BUL)	4
Ekrem Öztürk (TUR)	12
Nugzari Tsurtsumia (GEO)	6
Vasily Topoev (RUS)	6
