= Shota Ogawa =

Japanese sport wrestler

Personal information
- Nationality: (Japan) Japanese
- Weight: 55 kg (121 lb)

Sport
- Country: Japan
- Sport: Wrestling
- Event: Greco-Roman
Medal record
Men's Greco-Roman wrestling
Representing Japan
World Championships
Bronze medal – third place	2019 Nur-Sultan	55 kg
World U23 Championships
Gold medal – first place	2019 Budapest	55 kg

Shota Ogawa is a Japanese sport wrestler who competes in the men's Greco Roman category. He claimed bronze medal in the men's 55 kg event during the 2019 World Wrestling Championships.
