= 2018 World Wrestling Championships – Men's Greco-Roman 55 kg =

Men's Greco-Roman 55 kg at the 2018 World Championships
- Venue: László Papp Budapest Sports Arena
- Dates: 25–26 October 2018
- Competitors: 21 from 21 nations

Medalists
gold medal	Eldaniz Azizli	Azerbaijan
silver medal	Zholaman Sharshenbekov	Kyrgyzstan
bronze medal	Ekrem Öztürk	Turkey
bronze medal	Nugzari Tsurtsumia	Georgia

The men's Greco-Roman 55 kilograms is a competition featured at the 2018 World Wrestling Championships, and was held in Budapest, Hungary on 25 and 26 October.

This Greco-Roman wrestling competition consists of a single-elimination tournament, with a repechage used to determine the winner of two bronze medals. The two finalists face off for gold and silver medals. Each wrestler who loses to one of the two finalists moves into the repechage, culminating in a pair of bronze medal matches featuring the semifinal losers each facing the remaining repechage opponent from their half of the bracket.

Eldaniz Azizli from Azerbaijan won the gold medal.

== Results ==
=== Final ===
Final
Zholaman Sharshenbekov (KGZ)	0
Eldaniz Azizli (AZE)	10

=== Top half ===
Round of 32

Round of 16
Ekrem Öztürk (TUR)	8
Sam Hazewinkel (USA)	0
Ilkhom Bakhromov (UZB)	8
Oleksandr Tryfonov (UKR)	3
Son Hee-dong (KOR)	0
Zholaman Sharshenbekov (KGZ)	9
Norayr Hakhoyan (ARM)	9
Tony Brala (CRO)	0

Quarterfinals
Ekrem Öztürk (TUR)	7
Ilkhom Bakhromov (UZB)	0
Zholaman Sharshenbekov (KGZ)	11
Norayr Hakhoyan (ARM)	0

Semifinals
Ekrem Öztürk (TUR)	0
Zholaman Sharshenbekov (KGZ)	9

=== Bottom half ===
Round of 32
Nedyalko Petrov (BUL)	0
Vasily Topoev (RUS)	8
Nugzari Tsurtsumia (GEO)	6
Moslem Naderi (IRI)	1
Cao Liguo (CHN)	9
Vijay (IND)	1
Eldaniz Azizli (AZE)	9
József Andrási (HUN)	0
Mostafa Al-Qade (JOR)	0
Zhanserik Sarsenbiyev (KAZ)	5

Round of 16
Abdelkarim Fergat (ALG)	3
Sargis Khachatryan (BRA)	5
Vasily Topoev (RUS)	9
Nugzari Tsurtsumia (GEO)	11
Cao Liguo (CHN)	0
Eldaniz Azizli (AZE)	9
Zhanserik Sarsenbiyev (KAZ)	0
Shota Tanokura (JPN)	6

Quarterfinals
Sargis Khachatryan (BRA)	0
Nugzari Tsurtsumia (GEO)	8
Eldaniz Azizli (AZE)	9
Shota Tanokura (JPN)	0

Semifinals
Nugzari Tsurtsumia (GEO)	3
Eldaniz Azizli (AZE)	6

=== Repechage ===
Repechage round 1
József Andrási (HUN)	0
Cao Liguo (CHN)	10

Repechage round 2
Son Hee-dong (KOR)	6
Norayr Hakhoyan (ARM)	8
Cao Liguo (CHN)	5
Shota Tanokura (JPN)	5

Bronze medals
Norayr Hakhoyan (ARM)	0
Ekrem Öztürk (TUR)	4
Cao Liguo (CHN)	0
Nugzari Tsurtsumia (GEO)	11
