= 2020 European Wrestling Championships – Men's Greco-Roman 55 kg =

Wrestling competition

The Men's Greco-Roman 55 kg is a competition featured at the 2020 European Wrestling Championships, and was held in Rome, Italy on February 10 and February 11.

== Medalists ==
Gold	Edmond Nazaryan; Bulgaria
Silver	Vitalii Kabaloev; Russia
Bronze	Eldaniz Azizli; Azerbaijan
Bronze	Nugzari Tsurtsumia; Georgia

== Results ==
Legend

- F — Won by fall

1/8 finals
Fabian Schmitt (GER)	0
Giovanni Freni (ITA)	8
Snorre Lund (NOR)	0
Edmond Nazaryan (BUL)	8
Doğuş Ayazcı (TUR)	4
Vitalii Kabaloev (RUS)	9
Koryun Sahradian (UKR)	2
Florin Tița (ROU)	6
Sargis Gevorgizyan (AUT)	0
Nugzari Tsurtsumia (GEO)	8
Maksym Vysotskyi (ISR)	0
Artium Deleanu (MDA)	9

Quarterfinals
Rudik Mkrtchyan (ARM)	1
Eldaniz Azizli (AZE)	7
Giovanni Freni (ITA)	2
Edmond Nazaryan (BUL)	14
Vitalii Kabaloev (RUS)	3
Florin Tița (ROU)	1
Nugzari Tsurtsumia (GEO)	8
Artium Deleanu (MDA)	0

Semifinals
Eldaniz Azizli (AZE)	5
Edmond Nazaryan (BUL)	7^{F}
Vitalii Kabaloev (RUS)	5
Nugzari Tsurtsumia (GEO)	2

Final
Edmond Nazaryan (BUL)	7
Vitalii Kabaloev (RUS)	3

Repechage round 1
Snorre Lund (NOR)	2
Giovanni Freni (ITA)	8
Doğuş Ayazcı (TUR)	6
Florin Tița (ROU)	8

Bronze medal match
Giovanni Freni (ITA)	0
Eldaniz Azizli (AZE)	9
Florin Tița (ROU)	0
Nugzari Tsurtsumia (GEO)	8

== Final standing ==
Rank	Athlete
1st place, gold medalist(s)	Edmond Nazaryan (BUL)
2nd place, silver medalist(s)	Vitalii Kabaloev (RUS)
3rd place, bronze medalist(s)	Eldaniz Azizli (AZE)
3rd place, bronze medalist(s)	Nugzari Tsurtsumia (GEO)
5	Giovanni Freni (ITA)
5	Florin Tița (ROU)
7	Artium Deleanu (MDA)
8	Doğuş Ayazcı (TUR)
9	Koryun Sahradian (UKR)
10	Snorre Lund (NOR)
11	Rudik Mkrtchyan (ARM)
12	Maksym Vysotskyi (ISR)
13	Sargis Gevorgizyan (AUT)
14	Fabian Schmitt (GER)
