= 2025 U20 World Wrestling Championships – Men's Greco-Roman =

The men's Greco-Roman competitions at the 2025 U20 World Wrestling Championships were held in Samokov, Bulgaria between 17 and 24 August 2025.

== Men's Greco-Roman ==
Legend

- F — Won by fall
- R — Retired
- C — Won by 3 cautions given to the opponent
- WO — Won by walkover

=== 55 kg ===
22 and 23 August

Final

Final
Turan Dashdamirov (AZE)	3
Payam Ahmadi (IRI)	5

Top half

Round of 32
Nuryagdy Dowranow (TKM)	0
Shi Huoying (CHN)	9
Nazarii Babinskyi (UKR)	8
Caleb Noble (USA)	0
Anil Mor (IND)	8
Yordan Topalov (BUL)	0

Round of 16
Daisuke Morishita (JPN)	7
Filip Bartošík (CZE)	3
Shi Huoying (CHN)	1
Koba Karumidze (GEO)	10
~~Abdallah Dahmani (MAR)~~
Nazarii Babinskyi (UKR)	WO
Anil Mor (IND)	9
Turan Dashdamirov (AZE)	9

Quarterfinals
Daisuke Morishita (JPN)	12^{F}
Koba Karumidze (GEO)	5
Nazarii Babinskyi (UKR)	0
Turan Dashdamirov (AZE)	10

Semifinals
Daisuke Morishita (JPN)	2
Turan Dashdamirov (AZE)	10

Bottom half

Round of 32
Rasim Ibrahimau (UWW)	0
Omur Yntymak Uulu (KGZ)	3^{F}
Mehmet Sarp (TUR)	0
Ivan Solomin (UWW)	8
Armen Gevorgyan (ARM)	3
Maxim Sarmanov (MDA)	6

Round of 16
Payam Ahmadi (IRI)	9
Omur Yntymak Uulu (KGZ)	4
Ivan Solomin (UWW)	10
Lenny Wörner (GER)	0
Jonpulat Tulkinboev (UZB)	2
Maxim Sarmanov (MDA)	1
Răducu Bedriagă (ROU)	0
Arsen Zhuma (KAZ)	9

Quarterfinals
Payam Ahmadi (IRI)	6
Ivan Solomin (UWW)	4
Jonpulat Tulkinboev (UZB)	0
Arsen Zhuma (KAZ)	11

Semifinals
Payam Ahmadi (IRI)	3
Arsen Zhuma (KAZ)	0

Repechage round 2
Anil Mor (IND)	7
Nazarii Babinskyi (UKR)	0
Omur Yntymak Uulu (KGZ)	3
Ivan Solomin (UWW)	3

Bronze medal match
Anil Mor (IND)	7
Daisuke Morishita (JPN)	10
Omur Yntymak Uulu (KGZ)	0
Arsen Zhuma (KAZ)	10

=== 60 kg ===
21 and 22 August

Final

Final
Yurik Mkhitaryan (ARM)	5
Aykhan Javadov (AZE)	12

Top half

Round of 32
Salamat Muratly (KAZ)	4
Suraj Vashisht (IND)	12
Takuma Nakashima (JPN)	0
Papik Dzhavadian (UWW)	5
Isaiah Cortez (USA)	4^{F}
Kristin Petrov (BUL)	1
Husniddin Ulugbekow (TKM)	4
Maksut Sultanov (UKR)	13
Lucas Lo Grasso (FRA)	1
Yurik Mkhitaryan (ARM)	9

Round of 16
Pedro Rodrigues (BRA)	6
Suraj Vashisht (IND)	8
Papik Dzhavadian (UWW)	8
Isaiah Cortez (USA)	5
Adam Silverin (SWE)	1
Maksut Sultanov (UKR)	3
Yurik Mkhitaryan (ARM)	8
Augusto Vargas (CHI)	0

Quarterfinals
Suraj Vashisht (IND)	3
Papik Dzhavadian (UWW)	1
Maksut Sultanov (UKR)	2
Yurik Mkhitaryan (ARM)	11

Semifinals
Suraj Vashisht (IND)	0
Yurik Mkhitaryan (ARM)	9

Bottom half

Round of 32
Khurshidbek Normukhammadov (UZB)	3
Hu Yunlong (CHN)	3
Sorin Costin (MDA)	2
Danila Charapenka (UWW)	10
Dragoș Dragă (ROU)	0
Mohammad-Amin Abdevali (IRI)	9
Noa Ljubić (CRO)	0
Ömer Altaş (TUR)	11
Ahmed Abdelbary Shaban (EGY)	0
Aykhan Javadov (AZE)	9

Round of 16
Kubanych Arinov (KGZ)	9
Hu Yunlong (CHN)	0
Danila Charapenka (UWW)	0
Vakhtang Lolua (GEO)	7
Mohammad-Amin Abdevali (IRI)	2
Ömer Altaş (TUR)	3
Aykhan Javadov (AZE)	9
Gracjan Jedut (POL)	0

Quarterfinals
Kubanych Arinov (KGZ)	4
Vakhtang Lolua (GEO)	4
Ömer Altaş (TUR)	3
Aykhan Javadov (AZE)	8

Semifinals
Vakhtang Lolua (GEO)	1
Aykhan Javadov (AZE)	7^{F}

Repechage round 1
Lucas Lo Grasso (FRA)	7
Augusto Vargas (CHI)	0
Ahmed Abdelbary Shaban (EGY)	7
Gracjan Jedut (POL)	1

Repechage round 2
Lucas Lo Grasso (FRA)	3
Maksut Sultanov (UKR)	1
Ahmed Abdelbary Shaban (EGY)	1
Ömer Altaş (TUR)	10

Bronze medal match
Lucas Lo Grasso (FRA)	1
Suraj Vashisht (IND)	1
Ömer Altaş (TUR)	0
Vakhtang Lolua (GEO)	9^{C}

=== 63 kg ===
23 and 24 August

Final

Final
Aytjan Khalmakhanov (UZB)	12
Aleks Margaryan (ARM)	2

Top half

Round of 32
Gaurav (IND)	2
Dumitru Rapesco (MDA)	2
Lukas Benzing (GER)	5^{F}
Yauheni Shved (UWW)	0
Manato Nakamura (JPN)	8
Vadym Matros (UKR)	0
Igor Punchenko (UWW)	7^{F}
William Ekerot (SWE)	0

Round of 16
Tural Ahmadov (AZE)	1
Gaurav (IND)	1
Lukas Benzing (GER)	3
Damir Ibrashov (KAZ)	5
Aytjan Khalmakhanov (UZB)	9^{F}
Manato Nakamura (JPN)	0
Igor Punchenko (UWW)	9
Al-Bara Chopalaev (EST)	0

Quarterfinals
Tural Ahmadov (AZE)	1
Damir Ibrashov (KAZ)	1
Aytjan Khalmakhanov (UZB)	6
Igor Punchenko (UWW)	4

Semifinals
Damir Ibrashov (KAZ)	0
Aytjan Khalmakhanov (UZB)	8

Bottom half

Round of 32
Murat Arıkoğlu (TUR)	0
Mohammad-Javad Aboutalebi (IRI)	8
Yang Hao (CHN)	0
Aleks Margaryan (ARM)	5^{F}
Ilias Laaouina (NED)	9
Emirlan Duishenaliev (KGZ)	0
Clisman Carracedo (ECU)	5
Kristiyan Milenkov (BUL)	7

Round of 16
Tsotne Bukia (GEO)	0
Mohammad-Javad Aboutalebi (IRI)	9
Aleks Margaryan (ARM)	8
Landon Drury (USA)	0
Bende Olasz (HUN)	0
Ilias Laaouina (NED)	9
Kristiyan Milenkov (BUL)	4
Ionuț Mereuță (ROU)	1

Quarterfinals
Mohammad-Javad Aboutalebi (IRI)	5
Aleks Margaryan (ARM)	9
Ilias Laaouina (NED)	2
Kristiyan Milenkov (BUL)	4

Semifinals
Aleks Margaryan (ARM)	9
Kristiyan Milenkov (BUL)	0

Repechage round 1
Yang Hao (CHN)	3
Landon Drury (USA)	3

Repechage round 2
Manato Nakamura (JPN)	1
Igor Punchenko (UWW)	7
Landon Drury (USA)	0
Mohammad-Javad Aboutalebi (IRI)	11

Bronze medal match
Igor Punchenko (UWW)	5
Damir Ibrashov (KAZ)	1
Mohammad-Javad Aboutalebi (IRI)	9
Kristiyan Milenkov (BUL)	0

=== 67 kg ===
22 and 23 August

Final

Final
Erzu Zakriev (UWW)	2
Zhantoro Mirzaliev (KGZ)	4

Top half

Round of 32
Ilian Doubach (FRA)	5
Dejan Berkec (SRB)	9
Takaku Suzuki (JPN)	8
Otto Black (USA)	4
Erzu Zakriev (UWW)	10
Pavel Alexe (ROU)	2
Dimitar Georgiev (BUL)	1
Vladyslav Pokotylo (UKR)	10
Narek Grigorian (ARM)	1
Faraim Mustafayev (AZE)	3
Alibek Turlygazy (KAZ)	1
Abdullah Keskin (TUR)	10

Round of 16
Jeong Min-gun (KOR)	9
Dejan Berkec (SRB)	2
Takaku Suzuki (JPN)	2
Erzu Zakriev (UWW)	10
Vladyslav Pokotylo (UKR)	3
Faraim Mustafayev (AZE)	4
Abdullah Keskin (TUR)	9
Jakub Suchecki (POL)	0

Quarterfinals
Jeong Min-gun (KOR)	0
Erzu Zakriev (UWW)	9
Faraim Mustafayev (AZE)	7
Abdullah Keskin (TUR)	2

Semifinals
Erzu Zakriev (UWW)	14
Faraim Mustafayev (AZE)	7

Bottom half

Round of 32
Liu Zhaoyan (CHN)	9
Anuj (IND)	0
Isa Bektemirov (AUT)	2
Fayozbek Eshmirzaev (UZB)	10
Attila Józsa (HUN)	10
Kevin Karl (GER)	0
Martin Cichý (CZE)	0
Anri Khozrevanidze (GEO)	8
Lucas da Silva (BRA)	0
Gholamreza Abdevali (IRI)	9
Zhantoro Mirzaliev (KGZ)	9
Ihar Zvarykin (UWW)	0

Round of 16
Vlad Danalachi (MDA)	0
Liu Zhaoyan (CHN)	8
Fayozbek Eshmirzaev (UZB)	7
Attila Józsa (HUN)	2
Anri Khozrevanidze (GEO)	1
Gholamreza Abdevali (IRI)	2
Zhantoro Mirzaliev (KGZ)	8
Saya Brunner (SUI)	0

Quarterfinals
Liu Zhaoyan (CHN)	2
Fayozbek Eshmirzaev (UZB)	5^{F}
Gholamreza Abdevali (IRI)	3
Zhantoro Mirzaliev (KGZ)	5

Semifinals
Fayozbek Eshmirzaev (UZB)	1
Zhantoro Mirzaliev (KGZ)	5

Repechage round 1
Pavel Alexe (ROU)	1
Takaku Suzuki (JPN)	2
Ihar Zvarykin (UWW)	1
Saya Brunner (SUI)	3

Repechage round 2
Takaku Suzuki (JPN)	7
Jeong Min-gun (KOR)	3
Saya Brunner (SUI)	0
Gholamreza Abdevali (IRI)	8

Bronze medal match
Takaku Suzuki (JPN)	4
Faraim Mustafayev (AZE)	5
Gholamreza Abdevali (IRI)	1
Fayozbek Eshmirzaev (UZB)	5

=== 72 kg ===
22 and 23 August

Final

Final
Gaspar Terteryan (ARM)	1
Ahmad Kodirov (UZB)	1

Top half

Round of 32
Jure Rajković (CRO)	3
Máté Végh (HUN)	4
Joel Adams (USA)	12
Rabil Askerov (UWW)	4
Arionas Kolitsopoulos (GRE)	3
Ahmad Reza Mohammadian (IRI)	1
Vladimir Pascari (MDA)	1
Jorge Gómez (MEX)	9
Seymur Gasimov (AZE)	2
Gaspar Terteryan (ARM)	6

Round of 16
Timur Nadorgin (ISR)	1
Máté Végh (HUN)	9
Joel Adams (USA)	1
Arionas Kolitsopoulos (GRE)	4
Sergey Stoev (BUL)	11
Jorge Gómez (MEX)	0
Gaspar Terteryan (ARM)	3
Yussuf Ashrapov (KAZ)	1

Quarterfinals
Máté Végh (HUN)	5
Arionas Kolitsopoulos (GRE)	7
Sergey Stoev (BUL)	1
Gaspar Terteryan (ARM)	7

Semifinals
Arionas Kolitsopoulos (GRE)	1
Gaspar Terteryan (ARM)	5

Bottom half

Round of 32
İbrahim Özdemir (TUR)	0
Ahmad Kodirov (UZB)	10^{F}
Anatolii Pasnak (UKR)	5^{F}
Aleksandre Rusitashvili (GEO)	3
Vinit (IND)	0
Mohamed Shaaban Ibrahim (EGY)	8
Daichi Tsutsumi (JPN)	2
Oliver Pada (FIN)	6

Round of 16
Chen Xin (CHN)	5
Ahmad Kodirov (UZB)	14
Anatolii Pasnak (UKR)	0
Ruben Stråkeved (SWE)	3
Kutman Temirbekov (KGZ)	5
Mohamed Shaaban Ibrahim (EGY)	3
Oliver Pada (FIN)	8
Hubert Sidoruk (POL)	1

Quarterfinals
Ahmad Kodirov (UZB)	3
Ruben Stråkeved (SWE)	1
Kutman Temirbekov (KGZ)	5
Oliver Pada (FIN)	9

Semifinals
Ahmad Kodirov (UZB)	11
Oliver Pada (FIN)	3

Repechage round 1
Seymur Gasimov (AZE)	3
Yussuf Ashrapov (KAZ)	5^{F}
İbrahim Özdemir (TUR)	6
Chen Xin (CHN)	9

Repechage round 2
Yussuf Ashrapov (KAZ)	8^{F}
Sergey Stoev (BUL)	3
Chen Xin (CHN)	0
Ruben Stråkeved (SWE)	5

Bronze medal match
Yussuf Ashrapov (KAZ)	2
Arionas Kolitsopoulos (GRE)	0
Ruben Stråkeved (SWE)	5
Oliver Pada (FIN)	14

=== 77 kg ===
23 and 24 August

Final

Final
Anri Putkaradze (GEO)	10
Ahoura Bouveiri (IRI)	1

Top half

Round of 32
Amirshoh Vahobov (UZB)	2
Azis Atanasov (BUL)	4
Aman Khokhar (IND)	7
Naoki Kadode (JPN)	0

Round of 16
Anri Putkaradze (GEO)	5
Akzhan Ykylassov (KAZ)	3
Azis Atanasov (BUL)	1
Leister Bowling IV (USA)	3
Kiryl Valeuski (UWW)	8
Aman Khokhar (IND)	0
Miro Leinonen (FIN)	1
Cen Renheng (CHN)	11

Quarterfinals
Anri Putkaradze (GEO)	9
Leister Bowling IV (USA)	0
Kiryl Valeuski (UWW)	7
Cen Renheng (CHN)	2

Semifinals
Anri Putkaradze (GEO)	5
Kiryl Valeuski (UWW)	4

Bottom half

Round of 32
Zalan Pek (SRB)	0
Ahoura Bouveiri (IRI)	8
Samvel Terteryan (ARM)	1
Davud Mammadov (AZE)	1

Round of 16
Dominik Botos (HUN)	3
Raatbek Paiazbekov (KGZ)	3
Ahoura Bouveiri (IRI)	8
Yusuf Tosun (TUR)	0
Ruslan Nesterenko (ISR)	0
Samvel Terteryan (ARM)	8
Zaur Beslekoev (UWW)	10
Petro Shafranskyi (UKR)	0

Quarterfinals
Raatbek Paiazbekov (KGZ)	0
Ahoura Bouveiri (IRI)	10
Samvel Terteryan (ARM)	1
Zaur Beslekoev (UWW)	3

Semifinals
Ahoura Bouveiri (IRI)	8
Zaur Beslekoev (UWW)	0

Repechage round 1
Zalan Pek (SRB)	4
Yusuf Tosun (TUR)	1

Repechage round 2
Akzhan Ykylassov (KAZ)	4
Leister Bowling IV (USA)	8
Zalan Pek (SRB)	3
Raatbek Paiazbekov (KGZ)	9

Bronze medal match
Leister Bowling IV (USA)	0
Kiryl Valeuski (UWW)	9
Raatbek Paiazbekov (KGZ)	0
Zaur Beslekoev (UWW)	8

=== 82 kg ===
21 and 22 August

Final

Final
Mikhail Shkarin (UWW)	4
Dias Seitkaliyev (KAZ)	1

Top half

Round of 32
Yrisbek Kalyev (KGZ)	2
Arvin Khosravy (USA)	7
Azimjon Soatullaev (UZB)	7
Santeri Karppinen (FIN)	0
Elmin Aliyev (AZE)	11
Kyrylo Shnyrov (UKR)	4

Round of 16
Oskar Lubera (POL)	1
Martik Petrosyan (ARM)	10
Arvin Khosravy (USA)	0
Reza Azarshab (IRI)	11
Antal Vamoš (SRB)	5
Azimjon Soatullaev (UZB)	7
Elmin Aliyev (AZE)	0
Mikhail Shkarin (UWW)	8

Quarterfinals
Martik Petrosyan (ARM)	7
Reza Azarshab (IRI)	3
Azimjon Soatullaev (UZB)	1
Mikhail Shkarin (UWW)	11

Semifinals
Martik Petrosyan (ARM)	0
Mikhail Shkarin (UWW)	9

Bottom half

Round of 32
Dias Seitkaliyev (KAZ)	12
Emmanouil Nikolaidis (GRE)	4
Szabolcs Szinay (HUN)	1
Taizo Yoshida (JPN)	9

Round of 16
Anri Davitadze (GEO)	1
Prince (IND)	6
Dias Seitkaliyev (KAZ)	3
Mihael Lukač (CRO)	1
Ömer Faruk İldeş (TUR)	0
Taizo Yoshida (JPN)	9
Wang Shengsong (CHN)	0
Martin Shishekov (BUL)	9^{F}

Quarterfinals
Prince (IND)	0
Dias Seitkaliyev (KAZ)	9
Taizo Yoshida (JPN)	6
Martin Shishekov (BUL)	0

Semifinals
Dias Seitkaliyev (KAZ)	9
Taizo Yoshida (JPN)	0

Repechage round 1
Emmanouil Nikolaidis (GRE)	1
Mihael Lukač (CRO)	6

Repechage round 2
Elmin Aliyev (AZE)	0
Azimjon Soatullaev (UZB)	8
Mihael Lukač (CRO)	0
Prince (IND)	5

Bronze medal match
Azimjon Soatullaev (UZB)	8
Martik Petrosyan (ARM)	0
Prince (IND)	0
Taizo Yoshida (JPN)	11

=== 87 kg ===
23 and 24 August

Final

Final
Abdurakhman Abdulkadyrov (UWW)	1
Luka Kochalidze (GEO)	2^{F}

Top half

Round of 32
Isshin Onitsuka (JPN)	13
Josef Černý (CZE)	3
Orkhan Hajiyev (AZE)	10
Cristian Rusu (MDA)	0
Gabriel Stan (ROU)	6
Rohit Bura (IND)	4
Temirlan Turdakyn (KAZ)	3
Wojciech Iwanowski (POL)	2

Round of 16
Nick Nosler (USA)	0
Isshin Onitsuka (JPN)	8
Orkhan Hajiyev (AZE)	0
Abdurakhman Abdulkadyrov (UWW)	6^{F}
Paul Maier (AUT)	3
Gabriel Stan (ROU)	1
Temirlan Turdakyn (KAZ)	10
Zalán Varga (HUN)	1

Quarterfinals
Isshin Onitsuka (JPN)	0
Abdurakhman Abdulkadyrov (UWW)	8
Paul Maier (AUT)	1
Temirlan Turdakyn (KAZ)	4

Semifinals
Abdurakhman Abdulkadyrov (UWW)	8
Temirlan Turdakyn (KAZ)	0

Bottom half

Round of 32
Itzhak Nemsadze (ISR)	0
Adilet Kenzhebekov (KGZ)	8
Branko Đukić (SRB)	1
Luka Kochalidze (GEO)	2
Antonio Lukač (CRO)	1
Amirsam Mohammad (IRI)	3
Zhang Tianming (CHN)	5
Elias Lyyski (FIN)	8

Round of 16
Erik Ter-Matevosyan (ARM)	9
Adilet Kenzhebekov (KGZ)	0
Luka Kochalidze (GEO)	5
Pavlo Torianyk (UKR)	1
Martin Ljosåk (NOR)	9
Amirsam Mohammad (IRI)	11
Elias Lyyski (FIN)	10
Yasin Çakır (TUR)	0

Quarterfinals
Erik Ter-Matevosyan (ARM)	2
Luka Kochalidze (GEO)	2
Amirsam Mohammad (IRI)	4
Elias Lyyski (FIN)	6

Semifinals
Luka Kochalidze (GEO)	6
Elias Lyyski (FIN)	0

Repechage round 1
Branko Đukić (SRB)	7
Pavlo Torianyk (UKR)	5

Repechage round 2
Orkhan Hajiyev (AZE)	12
Isshin Onitsuka (JPN)	3
Branko Đukić (SRB)	0
Erik Ter-Matevosyan (ARM)	8

Bronze medal match
Orkhan Hajiyev (AZE)	4
Temirlan Turdakyn (KAZ)	4
Erik Ter-Matevosyan (ARM)	1
Elias Lyyski (FIN)	1

=== 97 kg ===
22 and 23 August

Final

Final
Yehor Yakushenko (UKR)	5
Mohammad Hadi Seidi (IRI)	2

Top half

Round of 32
Yehor Yakushenko (UKR)	8
Pavel Savitski (UWW)	0
Salakhidin Aknazarov (KGZ)	0
Darius Kiefer (GER)	9
Vendel Vitai (HUN)	3
Dimitrios Pappas (GRE)	1

Round of 16
Sebastian Warchoł (POL)	2^{F}
Ryosei Katamatsu (JPN)	1
Yehor Yakushenko (UKR)	10
Amirkhon Berdikulov (UZB)	1
Nurassyl Amanaly (KAZ)	0
Darius Kiefer (GER)	10
Vendel Vitai (HUN)	2
Soren Herzog (USA)	1

Quarterfinals
Sebastian Warchoł (POL)	0
Yehor Yakushenko (UKR)	9^{F}
Darius Kiefer (GER)	9
Vendel Vitai (HUN)	0

Semifinals
Yehor Yakushenko (UKR)	5
Darius Kiefer (GER)	2

Bottom half

Round of 32
Choi Jae-no (KOR)	0
Ismayil Rzayev (AZE)	10
Ilia Komarov (AIN)	8
Kan Yikai (CHN)	0
Naman (IND)	3
Emir Ömer Bozbağ (TUR)	1

Round of 16
Grisha Voskanyan (ARM)	1
Ismayil Rzayev (AZE)	1
Ilia Komarov (UWW)	8
Gor Ayvazyan (GEO)	0
Andrej Rodin (CRO)	2
Naman (IND)	1
Affan Smajić (BIH)	1
Mohammad Hadi Seidi (IRI)	10

Quarterfinals
Ismayil Rzayev (AZE)	3
Ilia Komarov (UWW)	5
Andrej Rodin (CRO)	0
Mohammad Hadi Seidi (IRI)	9

Semifinals
Ilia Komarov (UWW)	3
Mohammad Hadi Seidi (IRI)	5

Repechage round 1
Pavel Savitski (UWW)	0
Amirkhon Berdikulov (UZB)	4

Repechage round 2
Amirkhon Berdikulov (UZB)	4^{F}
Sebastian Warchoł (POL)	0
Affan Smajić (BIH)	1
Andrej Rodin (CRO)	6

Bronze medal match
Amirkhon Berdikulov (UZB)	0
Darius Kiefer (GER)	8
Andrej Rodin (CRO)	0
Ilia Komarov (UWW)	8

=== 130 kg ===
23 and 24 August

Final

Final
Ali Iliasov (UWW)	9
Cemal Yusuf Bakır (TUR)	0

Top half

Round of 32
Abolfazl Fathi (IRI)	6^{F}
Saba Purtseladze (GEO)	0

Round of 16
Shilo Jones (USA)	1
Koppány László (HUN)	8
Abolfazl Fathi (IRI)	8
Talasbek Boobekov (KGZ)	0
Kuanysh Amangeldi (KAZ)	1
Leonhard Junger (AUT)	6
Ali Iliasov (UWW)	7
Viachaslau Fedaryna (UWW)	6

Quarterfinals
Koppány László (HUN)	2
Abolfazl Fathi (IRI)	4
Leonhard Junger (AUT)	0
Ali Iliasov (UWW)	8

Semifinals
Abolfazl Fathi (IRI)	4
Ali Iliasov (UWW)	5

Bottom half

Round of 32
Dionysios Zougris (GRE)	2
Uttam Rana (IND)	6^{F}
Mateusz Bieńczak (POL)	0
Mazaim Mardanov (AZE)	4^{F}

Round of 16
Min Seung-gyu (KOR)	0
Yeergen Yeersheng (CHN)	9
Uttam Rana (IND)	1
Ivan Yankovskyi (UKR)	9
Davit Baghramyan (ARM)	0
Mazaim Mardanov (AZE)	8
Cemal Yusuf Bakır (TUR)	8
Kosei Miyake (JPN)	5

Quarterfinals
Yeergen Yeersheng (CHN)	0
Ivan Yankovskyi (UKR)	10
Mazaim Mardanov (AZE)	3
Cemal Yusuf Bakır (TUR)	4

Semifinals
Ivan Yankovskyi (UKR)	0
Cemal Yusuf Bakır (TUR)	6^{F}

Repechage round 2
Viachaslau Fedaryna (UWW)	3
Leonhard Junger (AUT)	2
Kosei Miyake (JPN)	0
Mazaim Mardanov (AZE)	9

Bronze medal match
Viachaslau Fedaryna (UWW)	1
Abolfazl Fathi (IRI)	9
Mazaim Mardanov (AZE)	0
Ivan Yankovskyi (UKR)	8

== See also ==
- 2025 U20 World Wrestling Championships – Men's freestyle
- 2025 U20 World Wrestling Championships – Women's freestyle
