= Adem Uzun =

Turkish Greco-Roman wrestler

Personal information
- Full name: Adem Burak Uzun
- Nationality: Turkey
- Born: 1 January 2001 (age 25) Turkey
- Education: Giresun University
- Height: 160 cm (5 ft 3 in)

Sport
- Country: Turkey
- Sport: Amateur wrestling
- Weight class: 55 kg
- Event: Greco-Roman
- Club: İstanbul BBSK
- Coached by: Harun Doğan
Medal record
Men's Greco-Roman wrestling
Representing Turkey
European Championships
Gold medal – first place	2023 Zagreb	55 kg
Vehbi Emre & Hamit Kaplan Tournament
Gold medal – first place	2022 Istanbul	55 kg
Dan Kolov - Nikola Petrov Tournament
Gold medal – first place	2021 Plovdiv	55 kg
Gold medal – first place	2023 Sofia	55 kg
World U23 Championships
Bronze medal – third place	2021 Belgrade	55 kg
Bronze medal – third place	2023 Tirana	55 kg
European U23 Championship
Silver medal – second place	2021 Skopje	55 kg
Men's Freestyle wrestling
European Cadets Championships
Gold medal – first place	2018 Skopje	51 kg

Adem Uzun is a Turkish Greco-Roman wrestler competing in the 55 kg division. He is a member of İstanbul BBSK.

== Career ==
Adem Uzun captured silver medal in men's Greco-Roman 55 kg at 2021 European U23 Wrestling Championship.

Adem Uzun won one of the bronze medal in the greco-Roman style 55 kg at the 2021 World U23 Wrestling Championships held in Belgrade, the capital of Serbia. He reached the quarterfinals by defeating Arshad of India 7-1 in the last 16 round. He lost in the quarterfinals to Mavlud Rizmanov of Russia. He won by fall the bronze medal against Arslan Abdurakhmanov of Kazakhstan.

In 2022, he won the gold medal in his event at the Vehbi Emre & Hamit Kaplan Tournament held in Istanbul, Turkey.

In 2023, Adem became the European champion for the first time at the 2023 European Wrestling Championships in Zagreb, Croatia, defeating Azerbaijan's Eldaniz Azizli 11-3 with a technical superiority in the final match of the men's 55 kg wrestling championships. Starting the championship from the quarterfinals, Adem defeated his Armenian opponent Rudik Mkrtchyan with 12-3 technical superiority and advanced to the semifinals. In the semifinals, he beat his Georgian opponent Nugzari Tsurtsumia with 13-3 technical superiority and reached the final.
