= Emre Mutlu =

Turkish Greco-Roman wrestler

Personal information
- Born: c. 2003 Kayseri, Turkey
- Height: 160 cm (5 ft 3 in)
- Weight: 55 kg (121 lb; 8.7 st)

Sport
- Country: Turkey
- Sport: Amateur wrestling
- Event: Greco-Roman
- Club: Kayseri Şeker
Medal record
Men's Greco-Roman wrestling
Representing Turkey
European Championships
| Bronze medal – third place | 2022 Budapest | 55 kg |
Vehbi Emre & Hamit Kaplan Tournament
| Bronze medal – third place | 2025 Kocaeli | 60 kg |
Grand Prix
| Gold medal – first place | 2025 Tirana | 55 kg |
| Bronze medal – third place | 2022 Zagreb | 55 kg |
European U23 Championship
| Gold medal – first place | 2022 Plovdiv | 55 kg |
| Silver medal – second place | 2024 Baku | 55 kg |
European Juniors Championships
| Bronze medal – third place | 2022 Rome | 55 kg |

Emre Mutlu is a Turkish Greco-Roman wrestler competing in the 55 kg division. He is a member of Kayseri Şeker Club.

== Career ==
In 2022, he won one of the bronze medals in the men's 55 kg event at the European Wrestling Championships held in Budapest, Hungary. He won the gold medal in his event at the 2022 European U23 Wrestling Championship held in Plovdiv, Bulgaria.

== Major results ==
| Year | Tournament | Location | Result | Event |
|---|---|---|---|---|
| 2022 | European Championships | Budapest, Hungary | 3rd | Greco-Roman 55 kg |
