= Ken Matsui =

Japanese Greco-Roman wrestler

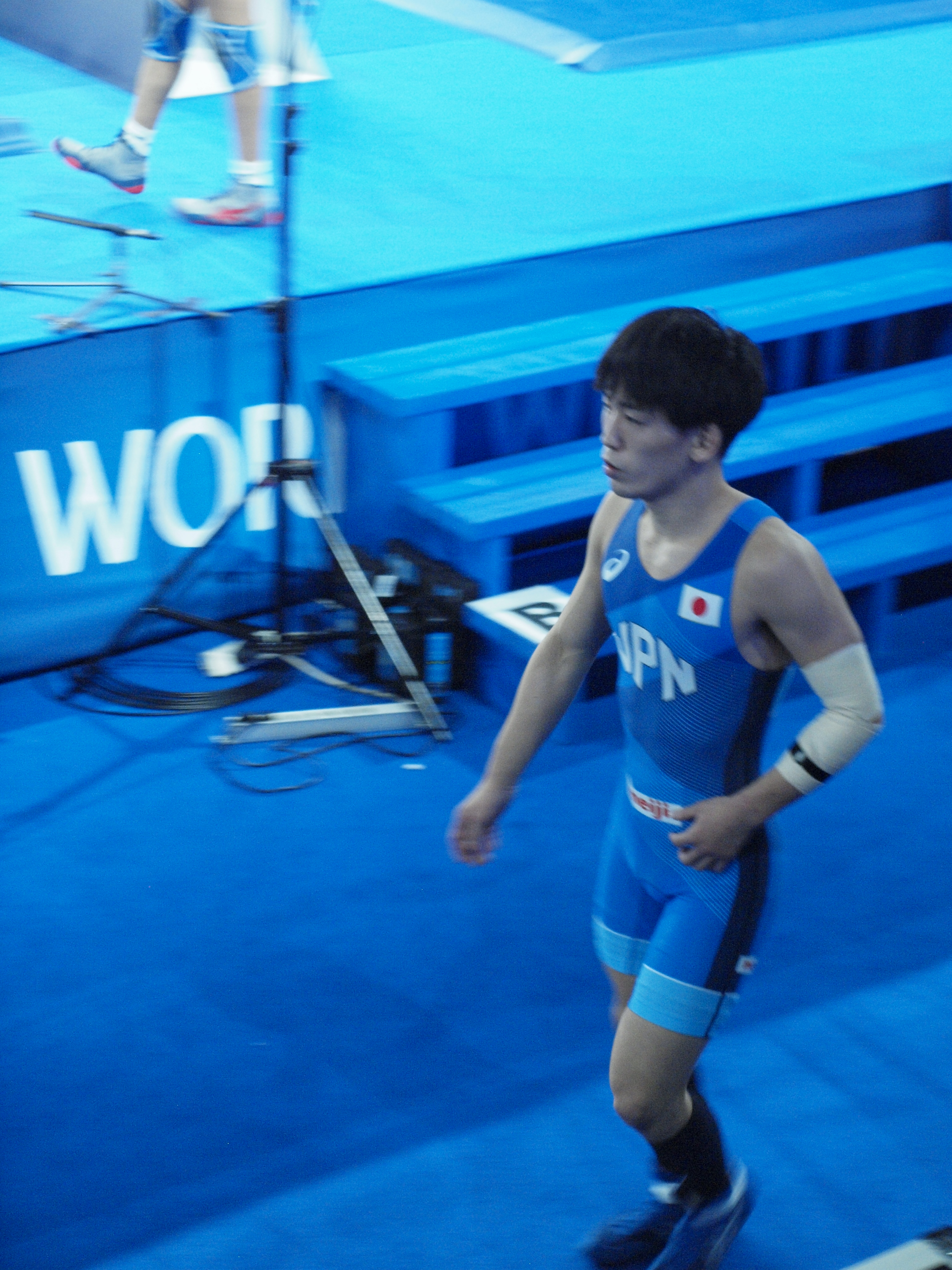
- Ken Matsui at the 2021 World Wrestling Championships in Oslo, Norway

Personal information
- Nationality: Japan
- Born: 松井健; 15 January 2001 (age 25) Aichi, Japan
- Height: 161 cm (5 ft 3 in)

Sport
- Country: Japan
- Sport: Amateur Wrestling
- Weight class: 55 kg
- Event: Greco-Roman

Achievements and titles
- World finals: (gold) (2021)
Medal record
Men's Greco-Roman wrestling
Representing Japan
World Championships
Gold medal – first place	2021 Oslo	55 kg
World Juniors Championships
Bronze medal – third place	2019 Tallinn	55 kg
World Cadets Championships
Gold medal – first place	2017 Athens	50 kg

Ken Matsui (born 15 January 2001) is a Japanese Greco-Roman wrestler. He won the gold medal in the 55 kg event at the 2021 World Wrestling Championships in Oslo, Norway.
