= 2025 European Wrestling Championships =

Wrestling competition held in Bratislava, Slovakia

2025 European Championships
- Host city: Bratislava, Slovakia
- Dates: 7-13 April
- Stadium: X-Bionic Sphere

Champions
- Freestyle: Azerbaijan
- Greco-Roman: Azerbaijan
- Women: Ukraine

The 2025 European Wrestling Championships was held from 7 to 13 April 2025 in Bratislava, Slovakia. At the 2025 European Championships, in accordance with sanctions imposed following by the 2022 Russian invasion of Ukraine, wrestlers from Russia and Belarus were not permitted to use the name, flag, or anthem of Russia or Belarus. They instead participated as "United World Wrestling (UWW)", their medals were not included in the official medal table. Two gold medals were awarded in the Men's Greco-Roman 72 kg category because the referee overseeing the result made a mistake. The bout originally ended in victory for the Hungarian.

== Competition schedule ==
All times are (UTC+2)

Date	Time	Event
7 April	10.30-14.30	Qualification rounds: FS 57-65-70-79-97 kg
7 April	18:00-19.30	Semifinals: FS 57-65-70-79-97 kg
8 April	10.30-14.30	Qualification rounds: FS 61-74-86-92-125 kg; Repechage: FS 57-65-70-79-97 kg
8 April	16.45-17.45	Semifinals: FS 61-74-86-92-125 kg
8 April	18.00-21.00	Finals: FS 57-65-70-79-97 kg
9 April	10.30-14.30	Qualification rounds: WW 50-55-59-68-76 kg; Repechage: FS 61-74-86-92-125 kg
9 April	16.45-17.45	Semifinals: WW 50-55-59-68-76 kg
9 April	18.00-21.00	Finals: FS 61-74-86-92-125 kg
10 April	10.30-14.30	Qualification rounds: WW 53-57-62-65-72 kg; Repechage: WW 50-55-59-68-76 kg
10 April	16.45-17.45	Semifinals: WW 53-57-62-65-72 kg
10 April	18.00-21.00	Finals: WW 50-55-59-68-76 kg
11 April	10.30-14.30	Qualification rounds: GR 55-63-77-87-130 kg; Repechage: WW 53-57-62-65-72 kg
11 April	16.45-17.45	Semifinals: GR 55-63-77-87-130 kg
11 April	18.00-21.00	Finals: WW 53-57-62-65-72 kg
12 April	10.30-14.00	Qualification rounds: GR 60-67-72-82-97 kg; Repechage: GR 55-63-77-87-130 kg
12 April	16.45-17.45	Semifinals: GR 60-67-72-82-97 kg
12 April	18.00-21.00	Finals: GR 55-63-77-87-130 kg
13 April	15.00-16.45	Repechage: GR 60-67-72-82-97 kg
13 April	17.00-20.00	Finals: GR 60-67-72-82-97 kg

== Medal table ==
* Host nation (Slovakia)

Rank	Nation	Gold	Silver	Bronze	Total
–	United World Wrestling	11	3	10	24
1	Azerbaijan	4	2	7	13
2	Ukraine	4	0	5	9
3	Bulgaria	2	2	1	5
4	Hungary	2	1	3	6
5	Greece	2	0	0	2
6	Turkey	1	6	7	14
7	Armenia	1	3	1	5
7	France	1	3	1	5
9	Georgia	1	2	7	10
10	Albania	1	0	1	2
11	Norway	1	0	0	1
12	Romania	0	2	1	3
12	Serbia	0	2	1	3
14	Moldova	0	1	4	5
15	Germany	0	1	2	3
16	Sweden	0	1	0	1
17	Poland	0	0	3	3
17	Slovakia*	0	0	3	3
19	Austria	0	0	1	1
19	Czech Republic	0	0	1	1
19	Italy	0	0	1	1
Totals (21 entries)		31	29	60	120

== Team ranking ==
Rank	Men's freestyle		Men's Greco-Roman		Women's freestyle	
Rank	Team	Points	Team	Points	Team	Points
1	Azerbaijan	119	Azerbaijan	151	Ukraine	180
2	Georgia	114	Turkey	110	Turkey	158
3	Turkey	73	Hungary	104	Romania	79
4	Bulgaria	59	Georgia	91	Poland	54
5	Armenia	59	Armenia	89	France	53
6	Moldova	58	Bulgaria	83	Moldova	53
7	France	54	Moldova	60	Germany	53
8	Slovakia	45	Germany	49	Hungary	42
9	Hungary	45	Serbia	43	Azerbaijan	29
10	Poland	45	Ukraine	42	Greece	25

== Medal overview ==
=== Men's freestyle ===
Event	Gold	Silver	Bronze
57 kg	Nachyn Mongush; United World Wrestling	Azamat Tuskaev; Serbia	Aryan Tsiutryn; United World Wrestling
57 kg	Nachyn Mongush; United World Wrestling	Azamat Tuskaev; Serbia	Islam Bazarganov; Azerbaijan
61 kg	Zaur Uguev; United World Wrestling	Arsen Harutyunyan; Armenia	Zelimkhan Abakarov; Albania
61 kg	Zaur Uguev; United World Wrestling	Arsen Harutyunyan; Armenia	Andrii Dzhelep; Ukraine
65 kg	Ibragim Ibragimov; United World Wrestling	Khamzat Arsamerzouev; France	Vazgen Tevanyan; Armenia
65 kg	Ibragim Ibragimov; United World Wrestling	Khamzat Arsamerzouev; France	Ali Rahimzade; Azerbaijan
70 kg	David Baev; United World Wrestling	Arman Andreasyan; Armenia	Akaki Kemertelidze; Georgia
70 kg	David Baev; United World Wrestling	Arman Andreasyan; Armenia	Kanan Heybatov; Azerbaijan
74 kg	Chermen Valiev; Albania	Zaurbek Sidakov; United World Wrestling	Aghanazar Novruzov; Azerbaijan
74 kg	Chermen Valiev; Albania	Zaurbek Sidakov; United World Wrestling	Tajmuraz Salkazanov; Slovakia
79 kg	Akhmed Usmanov; United World Wrestling	Zelimkhan Khadjiev; France	Achsarbek Gulajev; Slovakia
79 kg	Akhmed Usmanov; United World Wrestling	Zelimkhan Khadjiev; France	Vladimeri Gamkrelidze; Georgia
86 kg	Magomed Ramazanov; Bulgaria	Mahamedkhabib Kadzimahamedau; United World Wrestling	Osman Göçen; Turkey
86 kg	Magomed Ramazanov; Bulgaria	Mahamedkhabib Kadzimahamedau; United World Wrestling	Artur Naifonov; United World Wrestling
92 kg	Dauren Kurugliev; Greece	Osman Nurmagomedov; Azerbaijan	Miriani Maisuradze; Georgia
92 kg	Dauren Kurugliev; Greece	Osman Nurmagomedov; Azerbaijan	Feyzullah Aktürk; Turkey
97 kg	Givi Matcharashvili; Georgia	Magomed Kurbanov; United World Wrestling	Richárd Végh; Hungary
97 kg	Givi Matcharashvili; Georgia	Magomed Kurbanov; United World Wrestling	Batyrbek Tsakulov; Slovakia
125 kg	Giorgi Meshvildishvili; Azerbaijan	Solomon Manashvili; Georgia	Dzianis Khramiankou; United World Wrestling
125 kg	Giorgi Meshvildishvili; Azerbaijan	Solomon Manashvili; Georgia	Kamil Kościółek; Poland

=== Men's Greco-Roman ===
Event	Gold	Silver	Bronze
55 kg	Emin Sefershaev; United World Wrestling	Eldaniz Azizli; Azerbaijan	Vakhtang Lolua; Georgia
55 kg	Emin Sefershaev; United World Wrestling	Eldaniz Azizli; Azerbaijan	Artiom Deleanu; Moldova
60 kg	Nihat Mammadli; Azerbaijan	Georgii Tibilov; Serbia	Sadyk Lalaev; United World Wrestling
60 kg	Nihat Mammadli; Azerbaijan	Georgii Tibilov; Serbia	Amiran Shavadze; Georgia
63 kg	Kerem Kamal; Turkey	Karen Aslanyan; Armenia	Mairbek Salimov; Poland
63 kg	Kerem Kamal; Turkey	Karen Aslanyan; Armenia	Vitalie Eriomenco; Moldova
67 kg	Hasrat Jafarov; Azerbaijan	Abu Muslim Amaev; Bulgaria	Arslanbek Salimov; Poland
67 kg	Hasrat Jafarov; Azerbaijan	Abu Muslim Amaev; Bulgaria	Joni Khetsuriani; Georgia
72 kg	Levente Lévai; Hungary	Shared gold	Ulvu Ganizade; Azerbaijan
72 kg	Ibrahim Ghanem; France	Shared gold	Mehmet Mustafa Şahin; Turkey
77 kg	Malkhas Amoyan; Armenia	Ramaz Zoidze; Georgia	Ahmet Yılmaz; Turkey
77 kg	Malkhas Amoyan; Armenia	Ramaz Zoidze; Georgia	Alexandru Solovei; Moldova
82 kg	Gurban Gurbanov; Azerbaijan	Erik Szilvássy; Hungary	Burhan Akbudak; Turkey
82 kg	Gurban Gurbanov; Azerbaijan	Erik Szilvássy; Hungary	Gela Bolkvadze; Georgia
87 kg	Dávid Losonczi; Hungary	Semen Novikov; Bulgaria	Islam Abbasov; Azerbaijan
87 kg	Dávid Losonczi; Hungary	Semen Novikov; Bulgaria	Aleksandr Komarov; Serbia
97 kg	Kiril Milov; Bulgaria	Lucas Lazogianis; Germany	Alex Szőke; Hungary
97 kg	Kiril Milov; Bulgaria	Lucas Lazogianis; Germany	Kiryl Maskevich; United World Wrestling
130 kg	Sergey Semenov; United World Wrestling	Hamza Bakır; Turkey	Dáriusz Vitek; Hungary
130 kg	Sergey Semenov; United World Wrestling	Hamza Bakır; Turkey	Jello Krahmer; Germany

=== Women's freestyle ===
Event	Gold	Silver	Bronze
50 kg	Oksana Livach; Ukraine	Evin Demirhan Yavuz; Turkey	Nadezhda Sokolova; United World Wrestling
50 kg	Oksana Livach; Ukraine	Evin Demirhan Yavuz; Turkey	Natallia Varakina; United World Wrestling
53 kg	Maria Prevolaraki; Greece	Andreea Ana; Romania	Natalia Malysheva; United World Wrestling
53 kg	Maria Prevolaraki; Greece	Andreea Ana; Romania	Zeynep Yetgil; Turkey
55 kg	Ekaterina Verbina; United World Wrestling	Tatiana Debien; France	Mariana Drăguțan; Moldova
55 kg	Ekaterina Verbina; United World Wrestling	Tatiana Debien; France	Oleksandra Khomenets; Ukraine
57 kg	Olga Khoroshavtseva; United World Wrestling	Elvira Süleyman Kamaloğlu; Turkey	Zhala Aliyeva; Azerbaijan
57 kg	Olga Khoroshavtseva; United World Wrestling	Elvira Süleyman Kamaloğlu; Turkey	Solomiia Vynnyk; Ukraine
59 kg	Anastasiia Sidelnikova; United World Wrestling	Bediha Gün; Turkey	Alina Filipovych; Ukraine
59 kg	Anastasiia Sidelnikova; United World Wrestling	Bediha Gün; Turkey	Aurora Russo; Italy
62 kg	Iryna Bondar; Ukraine	Johanna Lindborg; Sweden	Bilyana Dudova; Bulgaria
62 kg	Iryna Bondar; Ukraine	Johanna Lindborg; Sweden	Luisa Niemesch; Germany
65 kg	Grace Bullen; Norway	Irina Rîngaci; Moldova	Dinara Kudaeva; United World Wrestling
65 kg	Grace Bullen; Norway	Irina Rîngaci; Moldova	Iryna Koliadenko; Ukraine
68 kg	Alina Shauchuk; United World Wrestling	Kateryna Zelenykh; Romania	Buse Tosun Çavuşoğlu; Turkey
68 kg	Alina Shauchuk; United World Wrestling	Kateryna Zelenykh; Romania	Adéla Hanzlíčková; Czech Republic
72 kg	Alla Belinska; Ukraine	Nesrin Baş; Turkey	Alexandra Anghel; Romania
72 kg	Alla Belinska; Ukraine	Nesrin Baş; Turkey	Pauline Lecarpentier; France
76 kg	Anastasiya Alpyeyeva; Ukraine	Yasemin Adar Yiğit; Turkey	Martina Kuenz; Austria
76 kg	Anastasiya Alpyeyeva; Ukraine	Yasemin Adar Yiğit; Turkey	Anastasiya Zimiankova; United World Wrestling

== Participating nations ==
443 wrestlers from 33 countries:

1. Albania (5)
2. Armenia (17)
3. Austria (9)
4. Azerbaijan (24)
5. Belgium (3)
6. Bulgaria (20)
7. Croatia (7)
8. Czech Republic (6)
9. Denmark (1)
10. Spain (10)
11. Estonia (2)
12. Finland (9)
13. France (13)
14. Georgia (20)
15. Germany (18)
16. Greece (8)
17. Hungary (17)
18. Israel (3)
19. Italy (11)
20. Latvia (2)
21. Lithuania (10)
22. Moldova (25)
23. North Macedonia (6)
24. Netherlands (2)
25. Norway (6)
26. Poland (23)
27. Romania (12)
28. Serbia (7)
29. Switzerland (7)
30. Slovakia (15) (Host)
31. Sweden (9)
32. Turkey (30)
33. Ukraine (30)
34. United World Wrestling (Russia+Belarus) (56)

== See also ==
- List of European Championships medalists in wrestling (freestyle)
- List of European Championships medalists in wrestling (Greco-Roman)
- List of European Championships medalists in wrestling (women)
