= Max Nowry =

American wrestler (born 1990)

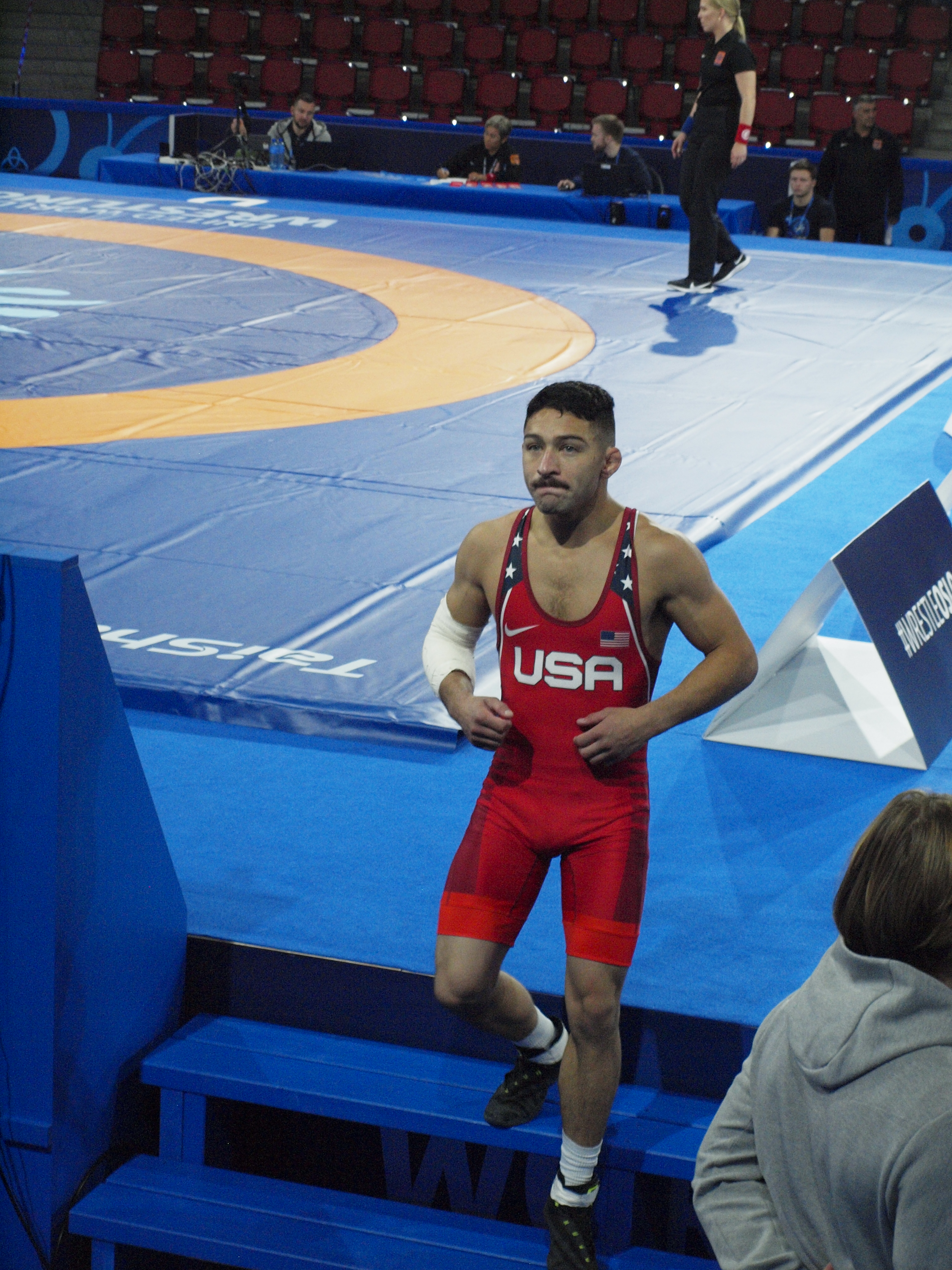
- Max Nowry at the 2021 World Wrestling Championships in Oslo, Norway

Personal information
- Full name: Max Emiliano Nowry
- Born: March 16, 1990 (age 36) Wheeling, Illinois, U.S.
- Education: Wheeling High School (IL)
- Height: 5 ft 4 in (163 cm)

Sport
- Country: United States
- Sport: Wrestling
- Events: Greco-Roman; Freestyle
Medal record
Representing the United States
Men's Greco-Roman wrestling
Pan American Championships
Gold medal – first place	2013 Panama City	55 kg
Gold medal – first place	2019 Buenos Aires	55 kg
Gold medal – first place	2020 Ottawa	55 kg
Gold medal – first place	2026 Coralville	55 kg
Silver medal – second place	2018 Lima	55 kg
Grand Prix
Bronze medal – third place	2022 Rome	55 kg
Men's freestyle wrestling
Military World Games
Bronze medal – third place	2019 Wuhan	57 kg

Max Emiliano Nowry (born March 16, 1990) is an American Greco-Roman wrestler. He is a four-time gold medalist at the Pan American Wrestling Championships. He has also competed in freestyle wrestling on a few occasions.

== Career ==
In 2013, Nowry represented the United States at the Summer Universiade where he finished in 5th place in the Greco-Roman 55 kg event.

In 2018, Nowry won the silver medal in the Greco-Roman 55 kg event at the Pan American Wrestling Championships held in Lima, Peru.

Nowry won the gold medal in the Greco-Roman 55 kg event at the 2019 Pan American Wrestling Championships held in Buenos Aires, Argentina. Later that year he won one of the bronze medals in the freestyle 57 kg event at the 2019 Military World Games held in Wuhan, China. In 2019 he also competed in the Greco-Roman 55 kg event at the 2019 World Wrestling Championships held in Nur-Sultan, Kazakhstan without winning a medal. He won his first match against Fabian Schmitt but he was eliminated from the competition in his next match against Khorlan Zhakansha. Zhakansha went on to win the silver medal.

In 2020, Nowry won the gold medal in the Greco-Roman 55 kg event at the Pan American Wrestling Championships held in Ottawa, Canada.

In 2022, Nowry won the bronze medal in his event at the Matteo Pellicone Ranking Series 2022 held in Rome, Italy.

== Achievements ==
Year	Tournament	Location	Result	Event
2013	Pan American Wrestling Championships	Panama City, Panama	1st	Greco-Roman 55 kg
2018	Pan American Wrestling Championships	Lima, Peru	2nd	Greco-Roman 55 kg
2019	Pan American Wrestling Championships	Buenos Aires, Argentina	1st	Greco-Roman 55 kg
2019	Military World Games	Wuhan, China	3rd	Freestyle 57 kg
2020	Pan American Wrestling Championships	Ottawa, Canada	1st	Greco-Roman 55 kg
2026	Pan American Wrestling Championships	Coralville, United States	1st	Greco-Roman 55 kg
