= Şerif Kılıç =

Turkish Greco-Roman wrestler

Personal information
- Born: 26 September 1993 (age 32) Samsun, Turkey

Sport
- Country: Turkey
- Sport: Amateur wrestling
- Event: Greco-Roman
- Club: Ankara Aski Sport Club
Medal record
Men's Greco-Roman wrestling
Representing Turkey
Individual World Cup
Silver medal – second place	2020 Belgrade	55 kg
Vehbi Emre & Hamit Kaplan Tournament
Gold medal – first place	2019 Istanbul	55 kg
Gold medal – first place	2023 Istanbul	55 kg
World University Championship
Bronze medal – third place	2018 Goiana	60 kg
Bronze medal – third place	2012 Kuortane	55 kg
World Juniors Championships
Gold medal – first place	2013 Sofia	55 kg
European Cadets Championships
Bronze medal – third place	2009 Zrenjanin	42 kg
Bronze medal – third place	2010 Sarajevo	50 kg

Şerif Kılıç (born 26 September 1993) is a Turkish Greco-Roman wrestler. He is a silver medalist at the 2020 Individual Wrestling World Cup.

== Career ==
Serif Kilic captured silver medal in men's Greco-Roman 55 kg at 2020 Individual World Cup.
