= Payam Ahmadi =

Iranian Greco-Roman wrestler (born 2006)

Personal information
- Native name: پیام احمدی
- Full name: Payam Ahmadi Balootaki
- Born: January 1, 2006 (age 20) Izeh, Khuzestan, Iran

Sport
- Sport: Amateur wrestling
- Weight class: 55 kg
- Event: Greco-Roman wrestling
Medal record
Men's Greco-Roman wrestling
Representing Iran
World Championships
Silver medal – second place	2025 Zagreb	55 kg
Silver medal – second place	2026 Astana	55 kg
Grand Prix
Gold medal – first place	2026 Ulaanbaatar	55 kg
World U20 Championships
Gold medal – first place	2025 Samokov	55 kg
Asian U20 Championships
Gold medal – first place	2023 Bishkek	55 kg
World U17 Championships
Gold medal – first place	2023 Istanbul	48 kg
Bronze medal – third place	2022 Rome	45 kg
Asian U17 Championships
Silver medal – second place	2022 Bishkek	45 kg

Payam Ahmadi (پیام احمدی; born 2006) is an Iranian Greco-Roman wrestler who competes in the 55 kg weight class. He won the silver medal at the 2025 World Wrestling Championships in Zagreb.

== Career ==
At the 2025 World Wrestling Championships in Zagreb, Croatia, Ahmadi competed in the men's Greco-Roman 55 kg category. He advanced through the rounds to reach the final, where he won the silver medal, securing his first podium at the senior world level.

At the 2026 World Wrestling Championships in Astana, He once again won a silver medal.
