= Emin Sefershaev =

Russian Greco-Roman wrestler

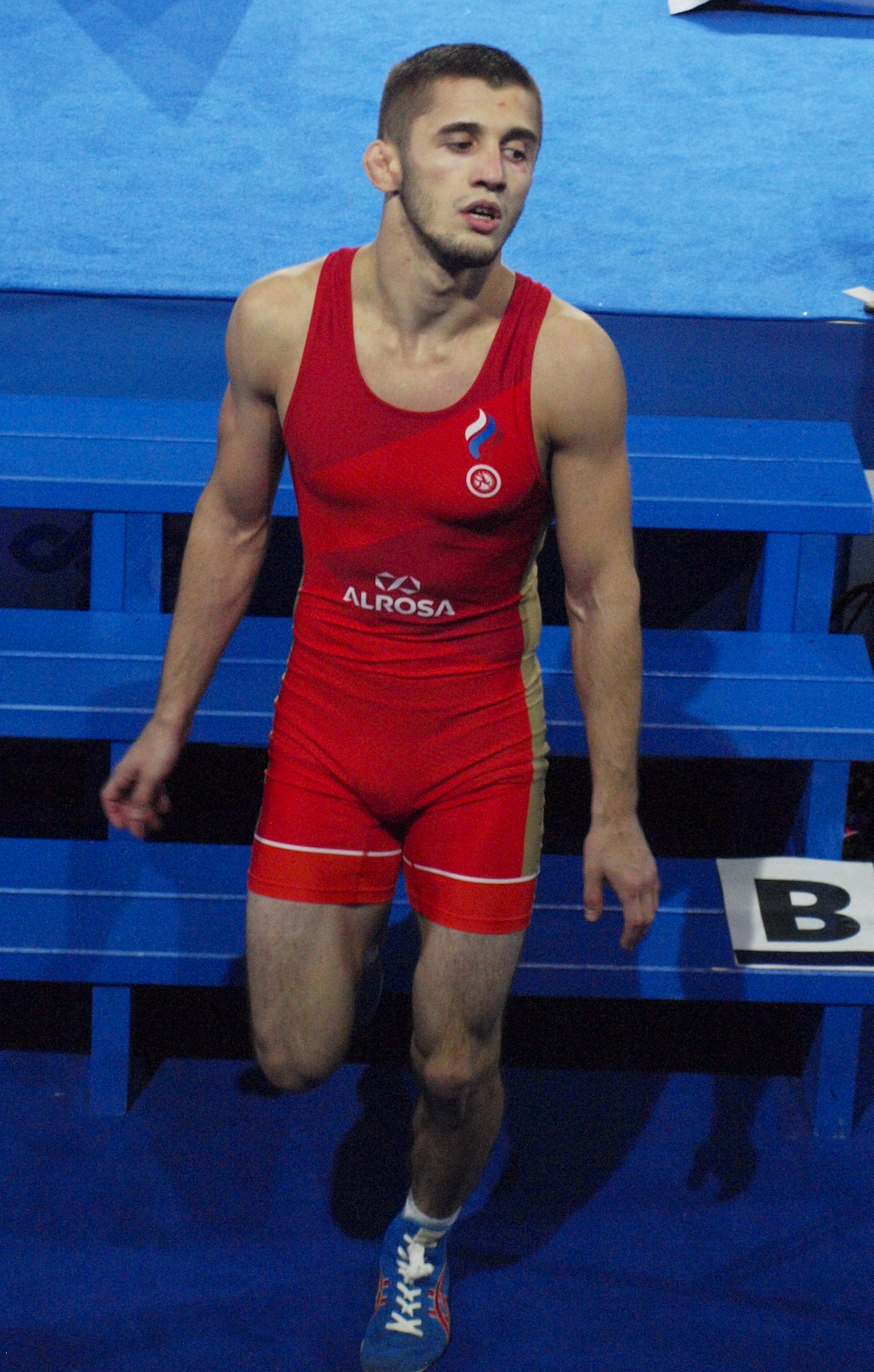
- Emin Sefershaev at the 2021 World Wrestling Championships in Oslo, Norway

Personal information
- Native name: Эмин Нариманович Сефершаев
- Full name: Emin Narimanovitch Sefershaev
- Nationality: Russia
- Born: Simferopol, Ukraine
- Height: 165 cm (5 ft 5 in)

Sport
- Country: Russia
- Sport: Amateur wrestling
- Weight class: 60 kg
- Event: Greco-Roman
- Coached by: Sergey Popenkov

Achievements and titles
- World finals: (silver) (2021)
- Regional finals: (gold) (2021)
Medal record
Men's Greco-Roman wrestling
Representing Individual Neutral Athletes
World Championships
Bronze medal – third place	2024 Tirana	55 kg
Representing United World Wrestling
European Championships
Gold medal – first place	2025 Bratislava	55 kg
Representing Russian Wrestling Federation
World Championships
Silver medal – second place	2021 Oslo	55 kg
Representing Russia
Individual World Cup
Gold medal – first place	2020 Belgrade	55 kg
European Championships
Gold medal – first place	2021 Warsaw	55 kg
World U23 Championships
Silver medal – second place	2019 Budapest	55 kg
World Juniors Championships
Bronze medal – third place	2018 Trnava	55 kg
Bronze medal – third place	2017 Tampere	55 kg
European Juniors Championships
Silver medal – second place	2017 Dortmund	55 kg
World Cadets Championships
Silver medal – second place	2015 Sarajevo	50 kg
European Cadets Championships
Gold medal – first place	2015 Subotica	50 kg
Representing Ukraine
European Cadets Championships
Gold medal – first place	2013 Bar	42 kg

Emin Narimanovitch Sefershaev (Russian: Эмин Нариманович Сефершаев) is a Russian Greco-Roman wrestler of Crimean Tatar heritage. In 2021, he became the European champion in the 55 kg event at the European Wrestling Championships in Warsaw, Poland. In that same year, he won the silver medal in this event at the World Wrestling Championships in Oslo, Norway.

== Career ==
In 2019, Sefershaev won the silver medal in the 55 kg event at the World U23 Wrestling Championship in Budapest, Hungary. In 2020, he won the gold medal in the 55 kg event at the Individual Wrestling World Cup held in Belgrade, Serbia.

In March 2021, Sefershaev won the gold medal in the 60 kg event at the Matteo Pellicone Ranking Series 2021 held in Rome, Italy. In April 2021, he won the gold medal in the 55 kg event at the European Wrestling Championships held in Warsaw, Poland. He defeated Ekrem Öztürk of Turkey in his gold medal match.

== Achievements ==
Year	Tournament	Venue	Result	Event
2021	European Championships	Warsaw, Poland	1st	Greco-Roman 55 kg
2021	World Championships	Oslo, Norway	2nd	Greco-Roman 55 kg
2025	European Championships	Bratislava, Slovakia	1st	Greco-Roman 55 kg
