= Khorlan Zhakansha =

Kazakhstani sport wrestler

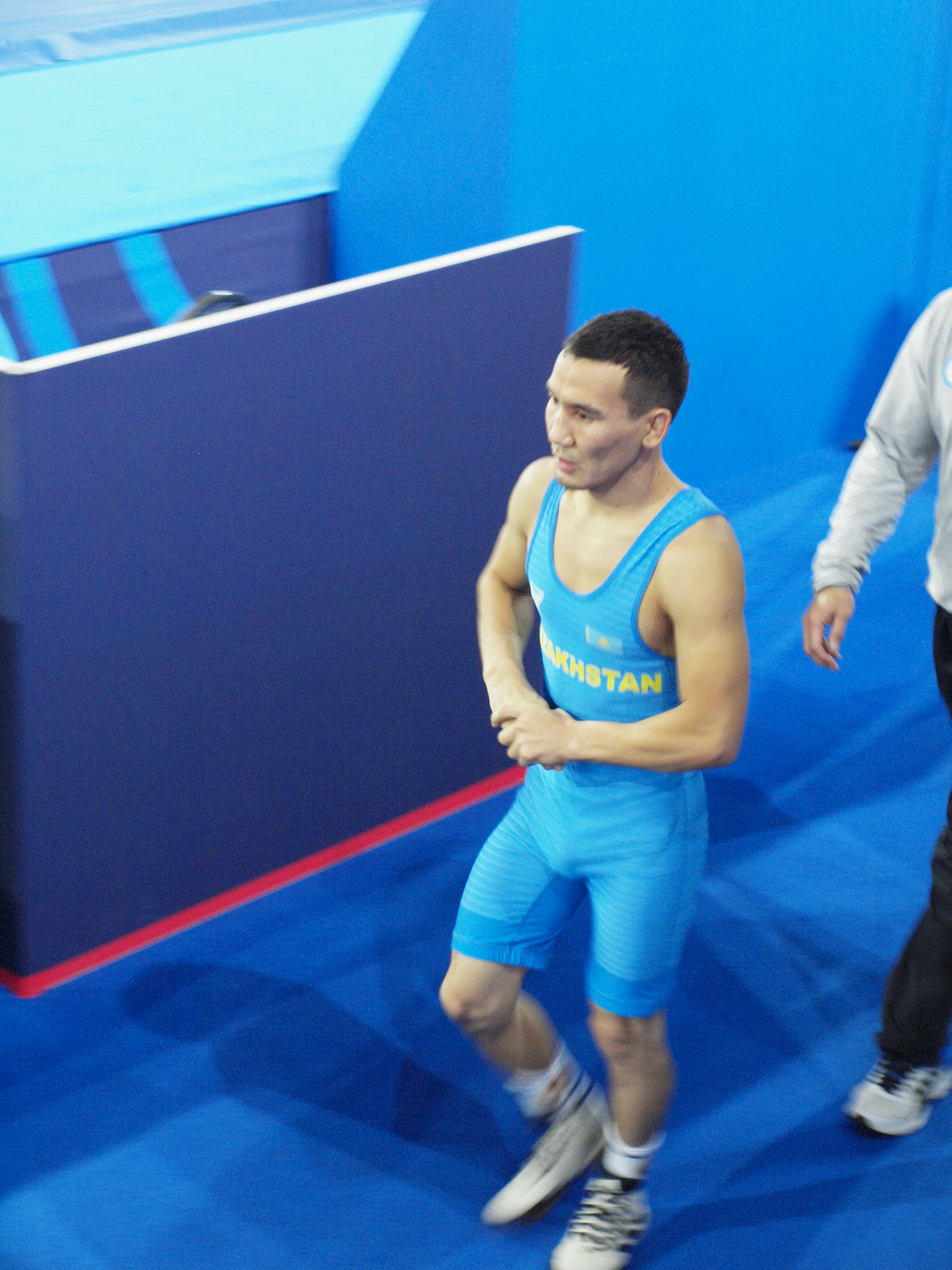
- Zhakansha at the 2021 World Wrestling Championships in Oslo, Norway

Personal information
- Nationality: (Kazakhstan) Kazakhstani
- Born: 15 June 1992 (age 34)
- Weight: 55 kg (121 lb)

Sport
- Country: Kazakhstan
- Sport: Wrestling
- Weight class: 55 kg
- Event: Greco-Roman
Medal record
Men's Greco-Roman wrestling
Representing Kazakhstan
World Championships
Silver medal – second place	2019 Nur-Sultan	55 kg
Asian Championships
Bronze medal – third place	2018 Bishkek	55kg
Bronze medal – third place	2019 Xi'an	55kg
Bronze medal – third place	2020 New Delhi	55kg

Khorlan Zhakansha (born 15 June 1992) is a Kazakhstani sport wrestler who competes in the men's Greco Roman category. He claimed silver medal in the men's 55 kg event during the 2019 World Wrestling Championships.

In 2021, he won the silver medal in the 55 kg event at the Matteo Pellicone Ranking Series 2021 held in Rome, Italy.
