= Fabian Schmitt =

German Greco-Roman wrestler

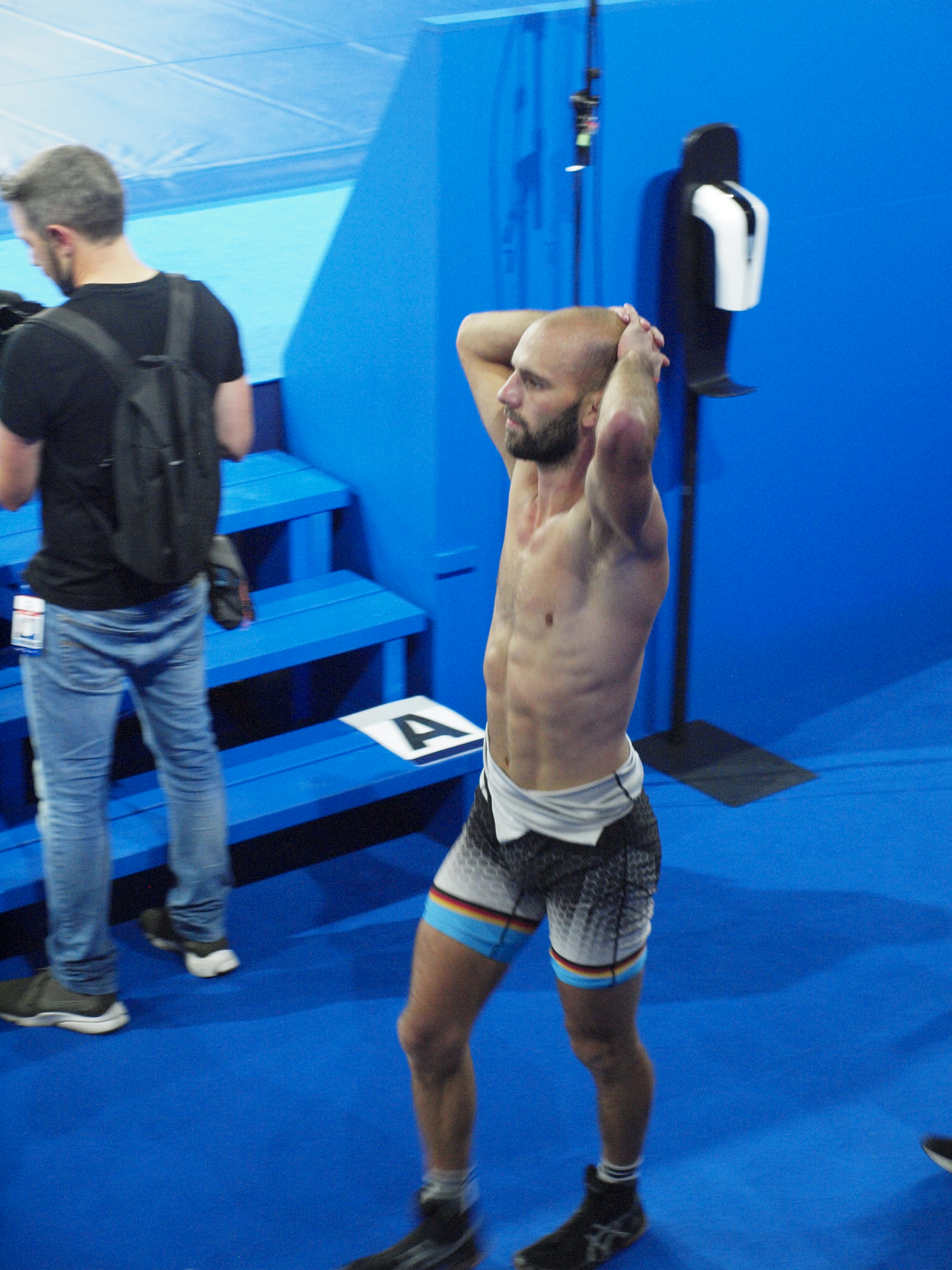
- 2021 World Wrestling Championships

Personal information
- Full name: Fabian Bernhard Schmitt
- Born: 15 June 1992 (age 34)
- Height: 167 cm (5 ft 6 in)

Sport
- Country: Germany
- Sport: Amateur wrestling
- Weight class: 55 kg
- Event: Greco-Roman
Medal record
Men's Greco-Roman wrestling
Representing Germany
European Championships
Bronze medal – third place	2019 Bucharest	55 kg

Fabian Bernhard Schmitt (born 15 June 1992) is a German Greco-Roman wrestler. He won one of the bronze medals in the 55 kg event at the 2019 European Wrestling Championships held in Bucharest, Romania.

== Career ==
Schmitt competed in the 55 kg event at the 2013 European Wrestling Championships held in Tbilisi, Georgia.

In 2019, Schmitt competed in the 55 kg event at the World Wrestling Championships held in Nur-Sultan, Kazakhstan where he was eliminated in his first match by Max Nowry of the United States. In 2020, he competed in the 55 kg event at the 2020 European Wrestling Championships held in Rome, Italy where he was eliminated in his first match by Giovanni Freni of Italy.

In January 2021, Schmitt won the bronze medal in the 55 kg event at the Grand Prix Zagreb Open held in Zagreb, Croatia. In April 2021, he lost his bronze medal match in the 55 kg event at the European Wrestling Championships in Warsaw, Poland. A year later, he competed in the 55 kg event at the 2022 European Wrestling Championships in Budapest, Hungary where he was eliminated in his first match.

== Achievements ==
Year	Tournament	Location	Result	Event
2019	European Championships	Bucharest, Romania	3rd	Greco-Roman 55 kg
