= Vitali Kabaloev =

Russian Greco-Roman wrestler

Personal information
- Native name: Виталий Ермакович Кабалоев
- Full name: Vitali Ermakovich Kabaloev
- National team: Russia
- Born: 18 September 1996
- Home town: Nalchik, Kabardino-Balkaria
- Height: 165 cm (5 ft 5 in)
- Weight: 55 kg (121 lb)

Sport
- Country: Russia
- Sport: Amateur wrestling
- Event: Greco-Roman
- Club: Mishin's wrestling academy
- Coached by: Nikolai Ataev
Medal record
Men's Greco-Roman wrestling
Representing Individual Neutral Athletes
Vehbi Emre & Hamit Kaplan Tournament
Bronze medal – third place	2024 Antalya	55 kg
Representing Russia
European Championships
Gold medal – first place	2019 Bucharest	55 kg
Silver medal – second place	2020 Rome	55 kg
World U23 Championships
Silver medal – second place	2018 Bucharest	55 kg

Vitali Ermakovich Kabaloev (Russian: Виталий Ермакович Кабалоев; born 18 September 1996) is a Russian Greco-Roman wrestler of Kabardian descent. He won gold in the 55 kg event at the 2019 European Championships held in Bucharest, Romania. In 2020, he won the silver medal in the 55 kg event at the 2020 European Championships held in Rome, Italy.

He is a twofold national champion, winning in 2018 and 2019.

In 2018, at the World U23 Wrestling Championship held in Bucharest, Romania, he won the silver medal in the 55 kg event.

== Achievements ==
Year	Tournament	Location	Result	Event
2019	European Championships	Bucharest, Romania	1st	Greco-Roman 55 kg
2020	European Championships	Rome, Italy	2nd	Greco-Roman 55 kg
