= Ekrem Öztürk =

Turkish Greco-Roman wrestler

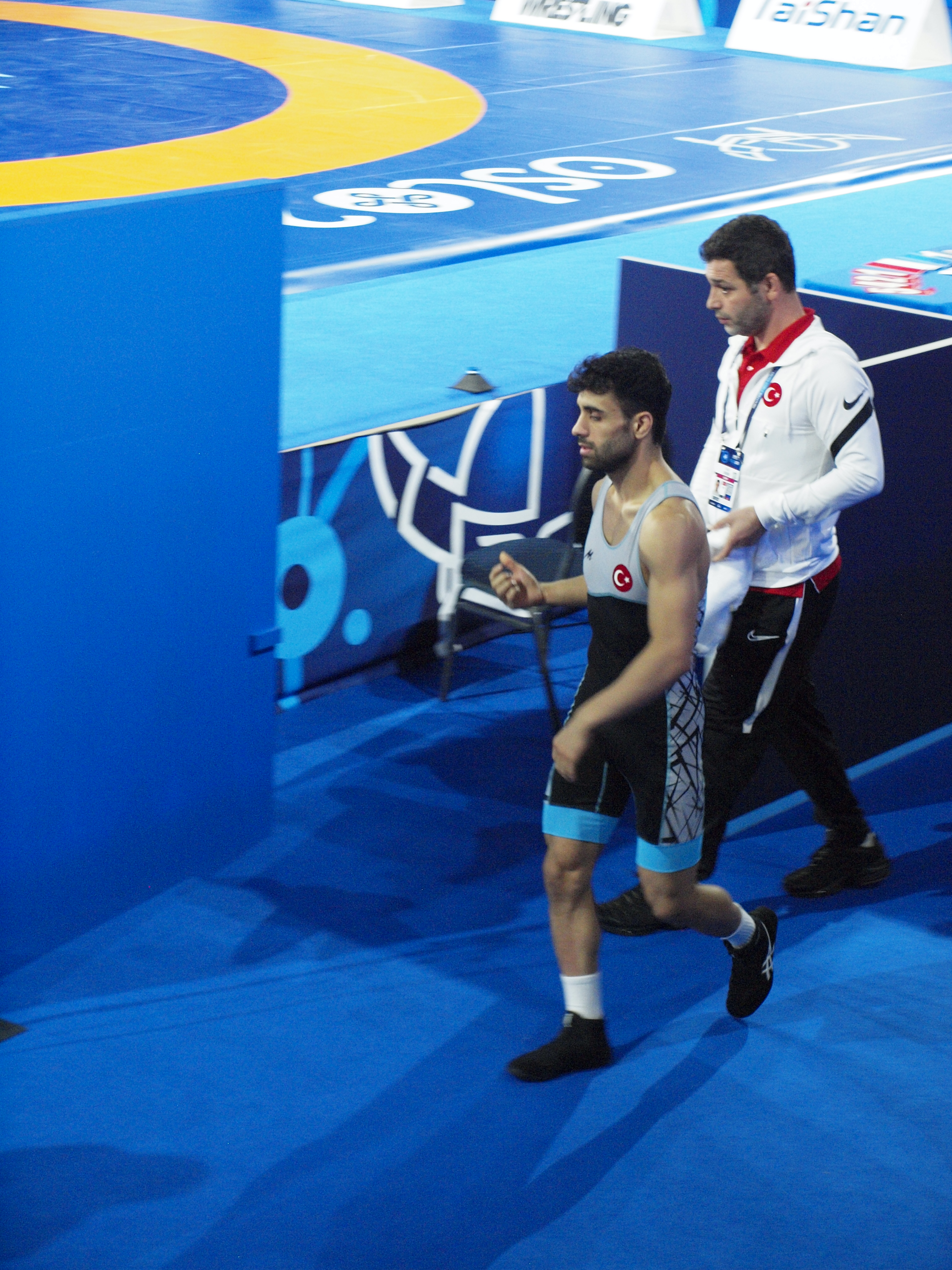
- Öztürk at the 2021 World Wrestling Championships

Personal information
- Born: February 11, 1997 (age 29) Gaziantep, Turkey
- Height: 1.62 m (5 ft 4 in)
- Weight: 55 kg (121 lb; 8.7 st)

Sport
- Country: Turkey
- Sport: Amateur wrestling
- Event: Greco-Roman - 55 Kg
- Club: Istanbul BB SK
Medal record
Men's Greco-Roman wrestling
Representing Turkey
World Championships
Bronze medal – third place	2018 Budapest	55 kg
Islamic Solidarity Games
Silver medal – second place	2025 Riyadh	60 kg
European Championships
Silver medal – second place	2021 Warsaw	55 kg
Bronze medal – third place	2018 Kaspiysk	55 kg
Vehbi Emre & Hamit Kaplan Tournament
Gold medal – first place	2018 Istanbul	55 kg
Silver medal – second place	2022 Istanbul	60 kg
Gold medal – first place	2025 Kocaeli	60 kg
World U23 Championships
Bronze medal – third place	2019 Budapest	55 kg
European U23 Championships
Silver medal – second place	2018 Istanbul	55 kg
World University Championship
Gold medal – first place	2018 Goiana	55 kg

Ekrem Öztürk is a Turkish Greco-Roman wrestler. He is a member of İstanbul Büyükşehir Belediyesi S.K. He is a bronze medalist at the World Wrestling Championships and a two-time medalist at the European Wrestling Championships.

== Career ==
He won a bronze medal in the 55 kg event at both the 2018 European Wrestling Championships and the 2018 World Wrestling Championships. In 2019, he won one of the bronze medals in the 55 kg event at the World U23 Wrestling Championship in Budapest, Hungary.

In 2021, he won the silver medal in the 55 kg event at the European Wrestling Championships held in Warsaw, Poland. A few months later, he won the silver medal in his event at the 2021 Poland Open held in Warsaw, Poland.

In 2022, he won the silver medal in the 60 kg event at the Vehbi Emre & Hamit Kaplan Tournament held in Istanbul, Turkey.

== Achievements ==
Year	Tournament	Venue	Result	Event
2018	European Championships	Kaspiysk, Russia	3rd	Greco-Roman 55 kg
2018	World Championships	Budapest, Hungary	3rd	Greco-Roman 55 kg
2021	European Championships	Warsaw, Poland	2nd	Greco-Roman 55 kg
2025	Islamic Solidarity Games	Riyadh, Saudi Arabia	2nd	Greco-Roman 60 kg
