= Nugzari Tsurtsumia =

Georgian sport wrestler (1997–2024)

Nugzari Tsurtsumia ნუგზარი წურწუმია
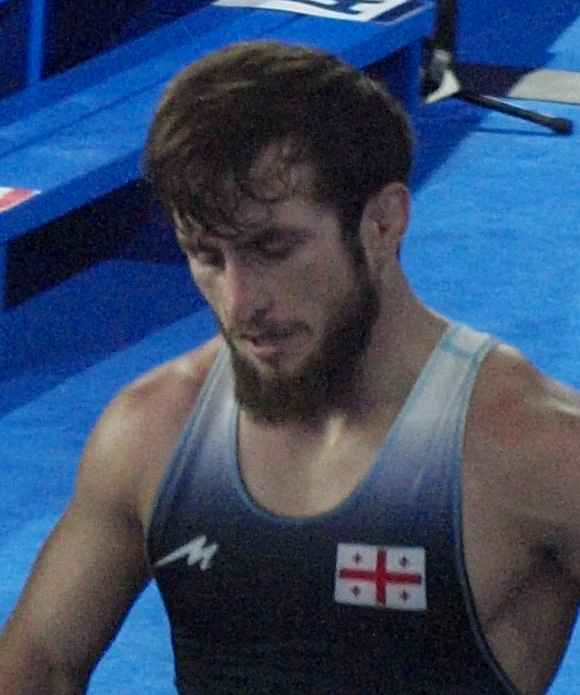
- Tsurtsumia in 2021

Personal information
- Born: 25 February 1997 Samegrelo-Zemo Svaneti, Georgia
- Died: 3 July 2024 (aged 27) Khobi, Georgia
- Height: 160 cm (5 ft 3 in)
- Weight: 55 kg (121 lb)

Sport
- Sport: Wrestling
- Event: Greco-Roman
- Coached by: Mamuka Korshia
Medal record
Representing Georgia
World Championships
Gold medal – first place	2019 Nur-Sultan	55 kg
Silver medal – second place	2022 Belgrade	55 kg
Silver medal – second place	2023 Belgrade	55 kg
Bronze medal – third place	2018 Budapest	55 kg
Bronze medal – third place	2021 Oslo	55 kg
European Championships
Silver medal – second place	2022 Budapest	55 kg
Bronze medal – third place	2018 Kaspiysk	55 kg
Bronze medal – third place	2020 Rome	55 kg
Bronze medal – third place	2023 Zagreb	55 kg
Representing All-World Team
World Cup
Bronze medal – third place	2022 Baku	Team

Nugzari Tsurtsumia (Georgian: ნუგზარი წურწუმია; 25 February 1997 – 3 July 2024) was a Georgian Greco-Roman wrestler who competed in the 55 kg category. After winning numerous medals at various international tournaments, Tsurtsumia became a world champion at the 2019 World Wrestling Championships in Nursultan, Kazakhstan.

== Death ==
Tsurtsumia died by suicide in July 2024, at the age of 27. His body was found on 3 July 2024 in his home in Khobi. His death came after he had lost his father, brother, and mother during the past six months.
