= Manvel Khachatryan =

Armenian Greco-Roman wrestler

Personal information
- Nationality: Armenia
- Born: 1 January 2004 (age 22) Armenia
- Height: 1.55 m (5 ft 1 in)
- Weight: 55 kg (121 lb; 8.7 st)

Sport
- Country: Armenia
- Sport: Amateur wrestling
- Weight class: 55 kg
- Event: Greco-Roman
Medal record
Men's Greco-Roman wrestling
Representing Armenia
European Championships
Bronze medal – third place	2024 Bucharest	55 kg
European U23 Championships
Bronze medal – third place	2026 Zrenjanin	55 kg

Manvel Khachatryan (born 2004) is an Armenian Greco-Roman wrestler competing in the 55 kg division.

== Career ==
In 2024, he won one of the bronze medals in the 55 kg event at the 2024 European Wrestling Championships held in Bucharest, Romania.

== Achievements ==
Year	Tournament	Location	Result	Event
2024	European Championships	Bucharest, Romania	3rd	Greco-Roman 55 kg
