= Denis Mihai =

Romanian Greco-Roman wrestler

Personal information
- Nationality: Romania
- Born: Denis Florin Mihai; 2 January 2003 (age 23) Romania
- Height: 1.60 m (5 ft 3 in)
- Weight: 55 kg (121 lb; 8.7 st)

Sport
- Country: Romania
- Sport: Amateur wrestling
- Weight class: 55 kg
- Event: Greco-Roman
Medal record
Men's Greco-Roman wrestling
Representing Romania
World Championships
Bronze medal – third place	2024 Tirana	55 kg
European Championships
Bronze medal – third place	2023 Zagreb	55 kg
Bronze medal – third place	2024 Bucharest	55 kg
Grand Prix
Gold medal – first place	2022 Zagreb	55 kg
Silver medal – second place	2023 Budapest	55 kg
Bronze medal – third place	2023 Alexandria	55 kg
Bronze medal – third place	2025 Budapest	55 kg
Dan Kolov - Nikola Petrov Tournament
Silver medal – second place	2022 Veliko Tarnovo	55 kg
European U23 Championships
Gold medal – first place	2023 Bucharest	55 kg
Bronze medal – third place	2022 Plovdiv	55 kg
World Juniors Championships
Silver medal – second place	2022 Sofia	55 kg
European Juniors Championships
Silver medal – second place	2022 Rome	55 kg
Bronze medal – third place	2021 Dortmund	55 kg

Denis Mihai (born 2 January 2003) is a Romanian Greco-Roman wrestler competing in the 55 kg division.

== Career ==
In 2024, he won one of the bronze medals in the 55 kg event at the 2024 European Wrestling Championships held in Bucharest, Romania.

== Achievements ==
Year	Tournament	Location	Result	Event
2023	European Championships	Bucharest, Romania	3rd	Greco-Roman 55 kg
2024	European Championships	Bucharest, Romania	3rd	Greco-Roman 55 kg
