= Artiom Deleanu =

Moldovan Greco-Roman wrestler

Personal information
- Born: 1 January 1999 (age 27) Moldova
- Height: 1.60 m (5 ft 3 in)
- Weight: 55 kg (121 lb; 8.7 st)

Sport
- Country: Moldova
- Sport: Greco-Roman
- Event: 55 kg
Medal record
Men's Greco-Roman wrestling
Representing Moldova
European Championships
Gold medal – first place	2024 Bucharest	55 kg
Bronze medal – third place	2025 Bratislava	55 kg
European U23 Championship
Bronze medal – third place	2019 Novi Sad	55 kg
Bronze medal – third place	2022 Plovdiv	55 kg
European Juniors Championships
Bronze medal – third place	2019 Pontevedra	55 kg

Artiom Deleanu (born January 1, 1999) is a Moldovan Greco-Roman wrestler who competes in the 55 kg division. He won the gold medal at the 2024 European Wrestling Championships.

== Career ==
Deleanu won the gold medal at the 2024 European Wrestling Championships in Bucharest, Romania, in the men's Greco-Roman style 55 kg, defeating the Azerbaijani's Rashad Mammadov 5–3 in the final match.

== Achievements ==
Year	Tournament	Location	Result	Event
2024	European Championships	Bucharest, Romania	1st	Greco-Roman 55 kg
2025	European Championships	Bratislava, Slovakia	3rd	Greco-Roman 55 kg
