= 2022 Poland Open =

2022 Ziolkowski, Pytlasinski, Poland Open
- Host city: Warsaw, Poland
- Dates: 20–24 July 2022
- Stadium: Arena Ursynów

Champions
- Freestyle: Ukraine
- Greco-Roman: Hungary
- Women: China

The 2022 Poland Open is a sport wrestling event was held in Warsaw, Poland between 20 and 24 July 2022. 26th Poland Open in Women's Wrestling, 31st Wacław Ziolkowski Memorial in Freestyle wrestling and 65th Wladyslaw Pytlasiński Memorial in Greco – Roman.

== Competition schedule ==
All times are (GMT+2)

Date	Time	Event
20 July	11.00-15.30	Qualification rounds & repechage FS 57-61-65-70-74-79 kg
20 July	18.00-20.30	Final matches and awarding ceremony: FS 57-61-65-70-74-79 kg
21 July	11.00-15.30	Qualification rounds & repechage FS 86-92-97-125 kg WW 50-53 kg
21 July	18.00-20.30	Final matches and awarding ceremony: Finals FS 86-92-97-125 kg WW 50-53 kg
22 July	11.00-15.30	Qualification rounds & repechage WW 55-57-59-62-65-68 kg
22 July	18.00-20.30	Final matches and awarding ceremony: Finals WW 55-57-59-62-65-68 kg
23 July	11.00-15.30	Qualification rounds & repechage GR 55-60-63-67 kg WW 72-76 kg
23 July	18.00-20.30	Final matches and awarding ceremony: Finals GR 55-60-63-67 kg WW 72-76 kg
24 July	11.00-15.30	Qualification rounds & repechage GR 72-77-82-87-97-130 kg
24 July	18.00-20.30	Final matches and awarding ceremony: Finals GR 72-77-82-87-97-130 kg

== Event videos ==
The event will air freely on the SportZona YouTube channel.

Broadcast
20 July 2022 Mat 1	20 July 2022 Mat 2	20 July 2022 Mat 3
21 July 2022 Mat 1	21 July 2022 Mat 2	21 July 2022 Mat 3
22 July 2022 Mat 1	22 July 2022 Mat 2	22 July 2022 Mat 3
23 July 2022 Mat 1	23 July 2022 Mat 2	23 July 2022 Mat 3
24 July 2022 Mat 1	24 July 2022 Mat 2	24 July 2022 Mat 3

== Medal table ==
* Host nation (Poland)

Rank	Nation	Gold	Silver	Bronze	Total
1	China	4	5	11	20
2	Ukraine	4	5	9	18
3	Poland	4	2	6	12
4	United States	3	2	4	9
5	Japan	3	2	2	7
6	Hungary	3	0	3	6
7	Armenia	2	3	3	8
8	Kyrgyzstan	1	4	3	8
9	Iran	1	1	1	3
10	Estonia	1	1	0	2
10	Norway	1	1	0	2
12	Georgia	1	0	4	5
13	Lithuania	1	0	0	1
13	Moldova	1	0	0	1
15	Romania	0	1	3	4
16	Kazakhstan	0	1	2	3
17	Denmark	0	1	0	1
17	Mongolia	0	1	0	1
19	Bulgaria	0	0	2	2
19	Finland	0	0	2	2
21	Brazil	0	0	1	1
21	Czech Republic	0	0	1	1
21	Germany	0	0	1	1
21	Latvia	0	0	1	1
21	Serbia	0	0	1	1
Totals (25 entries)		30	30	60	120

== Team ranking ==
Rank	Men's freestyle		Men's Greco-Roman		Women's freestyle	
Rank	Team	Points	Team	Points	Team	Points
1	Ukraine	123	Hungary	69	China	125
2	United States	109	Japan	66	Ukraine	87
3	Georgia	86	Kyrgyzstan	64	Poland	86
4	Poland	77	China	61	Kazakhstan	53
5	China	47	Armenia	53	Romania	24

== Medal overview ==
=== Men's freestyle (Waclaw Ziolkowski Memorial) ===
Event	Gold	Silver	Bronze
57 kg	Kamil Kerymov; Ukraine	Andriy Yatsenko; Ukraine	Manvel Khndzrtsyan; Armenia
57 kg	Kamil Kerymov; Ukraine	Andriy Yatsenko; Ukraine	Vito Arujau; United States
61 kg	Joe Colon; United States	Taras Markovych; Ukraine	Austin DeSanto; United States
61 kg	Joe Colon; United States	Taras Markovych; Ukraine	Liu Minghu; China
65 kg	Eduard Grigorev; Poland	Tseveensürengiin Tsogbadrakh; Mongolia	Erik Arushanian; Ukraine
65 kg	Eduard Grigorev; Poland	Tseveensürengiin Tsogbadrakh; Mongolia	Joseph McKenna; United States
70 kg	Arman Andreasyan; Armenia	Alec Pantaleo; United States	Zurabi Iakobishvili; Georgia
70 kg	Arman Andreasyan; Armenia	Alec Pantaleo; United States	Oleksii Boruta; Ukraine
747 kg	David Carr; United States	Zielimkhan Tohuzov; Ukraine	Giorgi Sulava; Georgia
747 kg	David Carr; United States	Zielimkhan Tohuzov; Ukraine	Hrayr Alikhanyan; Armenia
79 kg	Vasyl Mykhailov; Ukraine	Aram Avagyan; Armenia	Evsem Shvelidze; Georgia
79 kg	Vasyl Mykhailov; Ukraine	Aram Avagyan; Armenia	David McFadden; United States
86 kg	Lin Zushen; China	Sebastian Jezierzański; Poland	Ivars Samušonoks; Latvia
86 kg	Lin Zushen; China	Sebastian Jezierzański; Poland	Mukhammed Aliiev; Ukraine
92 kg	Jonathan Aiello; United States	Radosław Marcinkiewicz; Poland	Patryk Dublinowski; Poland
92 kg	Jonathan Aiello; United States	Radosław Marcinkiewicz; Poland	Andrii Vlasov; Ukraine
97 kg	Givi Matcharashvili; Georgia	Mahamed Zakariiev; Ukraine	Elizbar Odikadze; Georgia
97 kg	Givi Matcharashvili; Georgia	Mahamed Zakariiev; Ukraine	Erik Thiele; Germany
125 kg	Robert Baran; Poland	Tony Cassioppi; United States	Kamil Kościółek; Poland
125 kg	Robert Baran; Poland	Tony Cassioppi; United States	Yuriy Idzinskyy; Ukraine

=== Men's Greco-Roman (Wladyslaw Pytlasinski Cup) ===
Event	Gold	Silver	Bronze
55 kg	Yu Shiotani; Japan	Liu Jiahao; China	Rudik Mkrtchyan; Armenia
55 kg	Yu Shiotani; Japan	Liu Jiahao; China	Ulan Muratbek Uulu; Kyrgyzstan
60 kg	Kenichiro Fumita; Japan	Zholaman Sharshenbekov; Kyrgyzstan	Cao Liguo; China
60 kg	Kenichiro Fumita; Japan	Zholaman Sharshenbekov; Kyrgyzstan	Tan Haodong; China
63 kg	Tynar Sharshenbekov; Kyrgyzstan	Ali-Asghar Sam Daliri; Iran	Nikolay Vichev; Bulgaria
63 kg	Tynar Sharshenbekov; Kyrgyzstan	Ali-Asghar Sam Daliri; Iran	Răzvan Arnăut; Romania
67 kg	Slavik Galstyan; Armenia	Kyotaro Sogabe; Japan	Husiyuetu; China
67 kg	Slavik Galstyan; Armenia	Kyotaro Sogabe; Japan	Mate Nemeš; Serbia
72 kg	Róbert Fritsch; Hungary	Shant Khachatryan; Armenia	Gevorg Sahakyan; Poland
72 kg	Róbert Fritsch; Hungary	Shant Khachatryan; Armenia	Matias Lipasti; Finland
77 kg	Zoltán Lévai; Hungary	Shohei Yabiku; Japan	Minto Maeda; Japan
77 kg	Zoltán Lévai; Hungary	Shohei Yabiku; Japan	Akzhol Makhmudov; Kyrgyzstan
82 kg	Exauce Mukubu; Norway	Karapet Chalyan; Armenia	Mohammad Hossein Mahmoodi; Iran
82 kg	Exauce Mukubu; Norway	Karapet Chalyan; Armenia	Rosian Dermanski; Bulgaria
87 kg	Dávid Losonczi; Hungary	Turpal Bisultanov; Denmark	Erik Szilvássy; Hungary
87 kg	Dávid Losonczi; Hungary	Turpal Bisultanov; Denmark	Tamás Lévai; Hungary
97 kg	Mohammad Hadi Saravi; Iran	Beksultan Makhmudov; Kyrgyzstan	Arvi Savolainen; Finland
97 kg	Mohammad Hadi Saravi; Iran	Beksultan Makhmudov; Kyrgyzstan	Alex Szőke; Hungary
130 kg	Mantas Knystautas; Lithuania	Meng Lingzhe; China	Roman Kim; Kyrgyzstan
130 kg	Mantas Knystautas; Lithuania	Meng Lingzhe; China	Alin Alexuc-Ciurariu; Romania

=== Women's freestyle (Poland Open) ===
Event	Gold	Silver	Bronze
50 kg	Feng Ziqi; China	Oksana Livach; Ukraine	Fan Meng; China
50 kg	Feng Ziqi; China	Oksana Livach; Ukraine	Zhu Jiang; China
53 kg	Katarzyna Krawczyk; Poland	Zhong Yuhong; China	Ying Lu; China
53 kg	Katarzyna Krawczyk; Poland	Zhong Yuhong; China	Liliia Malanchuk; Ukraine
55 kg	Roksana Zasina; Poland	Marina Sedneva; Kazakhstan	Mariia Vynnyk; Ukraine
55 kg	Roksana Zasina; Poland	Marina Sedneva; Kazakhstan	Andreea Ana; Romania
57 kg	Anastasia Nichita; Moldova	Feng Yongxin; China	Zhang Qi; China
57 kg	Anastasia Nichita; Moldova	Feng Yongxin; China	Patrycja Gil; Poland
59 kg	Solomiia Vynnyk; Ukraine	Grace Bullen; Norway	Jowita Wrzesień; Poland
59 kg	Solomiia Vynnyk; Ukraine	Grace Bullen; Norway	Diana Kayumova; Kazakhstan
62 kg	Ilona Prokopevniuk; Ukraine	Sun Xinyuan; China	Luo Xiaojuan; China
62 kg	Ilona Prokopevniuk; Ukraine	Sun Xinyuan; China	Laís Nunes; Brazil
65 kg	Miwa Morikawa; Japan	Viktoria Vesso; Estonia	Kateryna Zelenykh; Ukraine
65 kg	Miwa Morikawa; Japan	Viktoria Vesso; Estonia	Long Jia; China
68 kg	Zhou Feng; China	Meerim Zhumanazarova; Kyrgyzstan	Adéla Hanzlíčková; Czech Republic
68 kg	Zhou Feng; China	Meerim Zhumanazarova; Kyrgyzstan	Rin Miyaji; Japan
72 kg	Yangla; China	Alexandra Anghel; Romania	Alexandra Zaitseva; Kazakhstan
72 kg	Yangla; China	Alexandra Anghel; Romania	Patrycja Sperka; Poland
76 kg	Epp Mäe; Estonia	Aiperi Medet Kyzy; Kyrgyzstan	Qiandegenchagan; China
76 kg	Epp Mäe; Estonia	Aiperi Medet Kyzy; Kyrgyzstan	Anastasiia Osniach; Ukraine

== Participating nations ==
386 wrestlers from 33 countries:

1. Angola (2)
2. Armenia (14)
3. Australia (6)
4. Brazil (2)
5. Bulgaria (8)
6. China (42)
7. Czech Republic (6)
8. Denmark (3)
9. Egypt (10)
10. Estonia (6)
11. Finland (9)
12. Georgia (15)
13. Germany (3)
14. Greece (1)
15. Hungary (23)
16. Iran (5)
17. Japan (15)
18. Kazakhstan (15)
19. Kyrgyzstan (13)
20. Latvia (4)
21. Lithuania (16)
22. Moldova (3)
23. Mongolia (2)
24. Netherlands (2)
25. New Zealand (1)
26. Norway (9)
27. Poland (66) (Host)
28. Romania (13)
29. Serbia (1)
30. Sweden (14)
31. Switzerland (14)
32. Ukraine (30)
33. United States (16)

== Results ==
Legend

- Ret — Retired
- WO — Won by walkover

=== Men's freestyle (Wacław Ziółkowski Memorial) ===
==== Men's freestyle 57 kg ====
	Score	
Round 1
Zou Wanhao (CHN)	14–4	Li Weiyu (CHN)
Roberti Dingashvili (GEO)	3–11	Vito Arujau (USA)
Andriy Yatsenko (UKR)	11–0	Thomas Epp (SUI)
Giorgi Gegelashvili (GEO)	11–0	Justin Holland (AUS)
Roman Hutsuliak (UKR)	3–5	Kamil Kerymov (UKR)
Round 2
Li Weiyu (CHN)	8–10	Roberti Dingashvili (GEO)
Thomas Epp (SUI)	6–4	Justin Holland (AUS)
Manvel Khndzrtsyan (ARM)	3–3	Zou Wanhao (CHN)
Vito Arujau (USA)	6–9	Kamil Kerymov (UKR)
Round 3
Roman Hutsuliak (UKR)	2—3	Roberti Dingashvili (GEO)
Thomas Epp (SUI)	0–4	Zou Wanhao (CHN)
Manvel Khndzrtsyan (ARM)	4–4	Andriy Yatsenko (UKR)
Giorgi Gegelashvili (GEO)	17–22 Fall	Kamil Kerymov (UKR)
Round 4
Vito Arujau (USA)	8–2	Zou Wanhao (CHN)
Final III–V
Manvel Khndzrtsyan (ARM)	6–4	Roberti Dingashvili (GEO)
Vito Arujau (USA)	12–2	Giorgi Gegelashvili (GEO)
Final I–II
Andriy Yatsenko (UKR)	3–4 Fall	Kamil Kerymov (UKR)

==== Men's freestyle 61 kg ====
	Score	
Round 1
Daniel DeShazer (USA)	4–6	Taras Markovych (UKR)
Valentyn Bliasetskyi (USA)	0–10	Austin DeSanto (USA)
Liu Minghu (CHN)	10–0	Teimuraz Vanishvili (GEO)
Nils Leutert (SUI)	0–10	Joe Colon (USA)
Round 2
Daniel DeShazer (USA)	5–2	Valentyn Bliasetskyi (USA)
Teimuraz Vanishvili (GEO)	4–5	Nils Leutert (SUI)
Taras Markovych (UKR)	5–4	Austin DeSanto (USA)
Liu Minghu (CHN)	2–13	Joe Colon (USA)
Final III–V
Austin DeSanto (USA)	11–0	Daniel DeShazer (USA)
Nils Leutert (SUI)	0–10	Liu Minghu (CHN)
Final I–II
Taras Markovych (UKR)}	13–16	Joe Colon (USA)

==== Men's freestyle 65 kg ====
	Score	
Round 1
Wurenibai Nuerlanbieke (CHN)	5–6	Eduard Grigorev (POL)
Krzysztof Bieńkowski (POL)	2–4	Beka Lomtadze (GEO)
Joseph McKenna (USA)	10–0	Vasyl Shuptar (UKR)
Mostafa Rezaeifar (AUS)	3–15	Nino Leutert (SUI)
Tony Tolbert (USA)	0–4 Fall	Tornike Katamadze (GEO)
Tseveensürengiin Tsogbadrakh (MGL)	11–8	Matthew Kolodzik (USA)
Gamzatgadzsi Halidov (HUN)	0–11	Erik Arushanian (UKR)
Round 2
Wurenibai Nuerlanbieke (CHN)	2–3	Krzysztof Bieńkowski (POL)
Vasyl Shuptar (UKR)	11–0	Mostafa Rezaeifar (AUS)
Tony Tolbert (USA)	0–10	Matthew Kolodzik (USA)
Eduard Grigorev (POL)	7–0	Beka Lomtadze (GEO)
Joseph McKenna (USA)	9–2	Nino Leutert (SUI)
Tornike Katamadze (GEO)	0–13	Tseveensürengiin Tsogbadrakh (MGL)
Round 3
Gamzatgadzsi Halidov (HUN)	3–5	Krzysztof Bieńkowski (POL)
Vasyl Shuptar (UKR)	7–5	Matthew Kolodzik (USA)
Beka Lomtadze (GEO)	11–7	Nino Leutert (SUI)
Erik Arushanian (UKR)	1–2	Eduard Grigorev (POL)
Joseph McKenna (USA)	1–2	Tseveensürengiin Tsogbadrakh (MGL)
Round 4
Tornike Katamadze (GEO)	0–6	Krzysztof Bieńkowski (POL)
Vasyl Shuptar (UKR)	3–2	Beka Lomtadze (GEO)
Final III–V
Erik Arushanian (UKR)	7–2	Vasyl Shuptar (UKR)
Krzysztof Bieńkowski (POL)	1–3	Joseph McKenna (USA)
Final I–II
Eduard Grigorev (POL)	7−0	Tseveensürengiin Tsogbadrakh (MGL)

==== Men's freestyle 70 kg ====
	Score	
Round 1
Ihor Nykyforuk (UKR)	WO	Vazgen Tevanyan (ARM)
Arman Andreasyan (ARM)	11–0	Marc Dietsche (SUI)
Zurabi Iakobishvili (GEO)	1–2	Alec Pantaleo (USA)
Oleksii Boruta (UKR)	4–4	Giorgi Elbakidze (GEO)
Round 2
Vazgen Tevanyan (ARM)	WO	Marc Dietsche (SUI)
Zurabi Iakobishvili (GEO)	2–0	Giorgi Elbakidze (GEO)
Yahya Thomas (USA)	4–5	Ihor Nykyforuk (UKR)
Round 3
Marc Dietsche (SUI)	0–5	Yahya Thomas (USA)
Ihor Nykyforuk (UKR)	3–10 Ret	Arman Andreasyan (ARM)
Alec Pantaleo (USA)	6–2	Oleksii Boruta (UKR)
Final III–V
Ihor Nykyforuk (UKR)	WO	Zurabi Iakobishvili (GEO)
Yahya Thomas (USA)	3–4	Oleksii Boruta (UKR)
Final I–II
Arman Andreasyan (ARM)	3–2	Alec Pantaleo (USA)

==== Men's freestyle 74 kg ====
	Score	
Round 1
Giorgi Sulava (GEO)	12–2	Wojciech Wysocki (POL)
Kamil Rybicki (POL)	0–5	Xia Shengsong (CHN)
David Carr (USA)	13–2	Menghejigan (CHN)
Zielimkhan Tohuzov (UKR)	10–0	Szymon Wojtkowski (POL)
Hrayr Alikhanyan (ARM)	2–0	Luka Mariamidze (GEO)
Round 2
Wojciech Wysocki (POL)	0–11	Kamil Rybicki (POL)
Menghejigan (CHN)	6–2	Szymon Wojtkowski (POL)
Vadym Tsurkan (UKR)	2–12	Giorgi Sulava (GEO)
Xia Shengsong (CHN)	1–12	David Carr (USA)
Round 3
Luka Mariamidze (GEO)	10–2	Kamil Rybicki (POL)
Menghejigan (CHN)	4–2	Vadym Tsurkan (UKR)
Giorgi Sulava (GEO)	0–10	David Carr (USA)
Zielimkhan Tohuzov (UKR)	8–4	Hrayr Alikhanyan (ARM)
Round 4
Xia Shengsong (CHN)	0–2 Fall	Luka Mariamidze (GEO)
Final III–V
Giorgi Sulava (GEO)	14–3	Luka Mariamidze (GEO)
Menghejigan (CHN)	0–10	Hrayr Alikhanyan (ARM)
Final I–II
David Carr (USA)	11–0	Zielimkhan Tohuzov (UKR)

==== Men's freestyle 79 kg ====
	Score	
Round 1
Arman Avagyan (ARM)	11–0	Patryk Kostrzewski (POL)
Alans Amirovs (LAT)	5–1	Aimar Andruse (EST)
Evsem Shvelidze (GEO)	11–0	Ernest Dorosz (POL)
Kieto Pacheco (ANG)	0–10	David McFadden (USA)
Alex Marinelli (USA)	11–0	Mateusz Pędzicki (POL)
Vasyl Mykhailov (UKR)	10–0	Tanguy Darbellay (SUI)
Erik Reinbok (EST)	12–1	Patryk Ciurzyński (POL)
Round 2
Patryk Kostrzewski (POL)	1–7	Aimar Andruse (EST)
Ernest Dorosz (POL)	2–0 Fall	Kieto Pacheco (ANG)
Mateusz Pędzicki (POL)	1–8 Fall	Tanguy Darbellay (SUI)
Csaba Vida (HUN)	1–12	Arman Avagyan (ARM)
Alans Amirovs (LAT)	6–8	Evsem Shvelidze (GEO)
David McFadden (USA)	10–0	Alex Marinelli (USA)
Vasyl Mykhailov (UKR)	8–1	Erik Reinbok (EST)
Round 3
Patryk Ciurzyński (POL)	10–19	Aimar Andruse (EST)
Ernest Dorosz (POL)	4–6	Tanguy Darbellay (SUI)
Csaba Vida (HUN)	15–4	Alans Amirovs (LAT)
Alex Marinelli (USA)	10–0	Erik Reinbok (EST)
Arman Avagyan (ARM)	9–7	Evsem Shvelidze (GEO)
David McFadden (USA)	0–6	Vasyl Mykhailov (UKR)
Round 4
Aimar Andruse (EST)	4–4	Tanguy Darbellay (SUI)
Csaba Vida (HUN)	15–13	Alex Marinelli (USA)
Final III–V
Evsem Shvelidze (GEO)	11–1	Tanguy Darbellay (SUI)
Csaba Vida (HUN)	0–10	David McFadden (USA)
Final I–II
Arman Avagyan (ARM)	2–10	Vasyl Mykhailov (UKR)

==== Men's freestyle 86 kg ====
	Score	
Round 1
Matthew Oxenham (NZL)	0–10	Krzysztof Sadowik (POL)
Stefan Reichmuth (SUI)	0–10	Ivars Samušonoks (LAT)
Lars Schäfle (GER)	10–0	Jayden Lawrence (AUS)
Filip Rogut (POL)	0–10	Lin Zushen (CHN)
Mukhammed Aliiev (UKR)	4–4	Sandro Aminashvili (GEO)
Cezary Sadowski (POL)	6–8	Khasan Zakariiev (UKR)
Tarzan Maisuradze (GEO)	4–5	Sebastian Jezierzański (POL)
Round 2
Matthew Oxenham (NZL)	0–10	Stefan Reichmuth (SUI)
Jayden Lawrence (AUS)	7–3	Filip Rogut (POL)
Mukhammed Aliiev (UKR)	12–2	Cezary Sadowski (POL)
Krzysztof Sadowik (POL)	2–3	Ivars Samušonoks (LAT)
Lars Schäfle (GER)	1–3	Lin Zushen (CHN)
Sandro Aminashvili (GEO)	2–1	Khasan Zakariiev (UKR)
Round 3
Tarzan Maisuradze (GEO)	3–1	Stefan Reichmuth (SUI)
Jayden Lawrence (AUS)	0–10	Mukhammed Aliiev (UKR)
Krzysztof Sadowik (POL)	2–1	Lars Schäfle (GER)
Sebastian Jezierzański (POL)	7–1	Ivars Samušonoks (LAT)
Lin Zushen (CHN)	4–1	Sandro Aminashvili (GEO)
Round 4
Khasan Zakariiev (UKR)	WO	Tarzan Maisuradze (GEO)
Mukhammed Aliiev (UKR)	11–0	Krzysztof Sadowik (POL)
Final III–V
Mukhammed Aliiev (UKR)	9–7	Khasan Zakariiev (UKR)
Ivars Samušonoks (LAT)	10–0	Sandro Aminashvili (GEO)
Final I–II
Sebastian Jezierzański (POL)	0–3	Lin Zushen (CHN)

==== Men's freestyle 92 kg ====
	Score	
Round 1
Patryk Dublinowski (POL)	0–11	Jonathan Aiello (USA)
Radosław Marcinkiewicz (POL)	3–4	Andriy Vlasov (UKR)
Round 2
Patryk Dublinowski (POL)	0–11	Radosław Marcinkiewicz (POL)
Jonathan Aiello (USA)	11–0	Andriy Vlasov (UKR)
Round 3
Patryk Dublinowski (POL)	5–5	Andriy Vlasov (UKR)
Jonathan Aiello (USA)	5–0	Radosław Marcinkiewicz (POL)

==== Men's freestyle 97 kg ====
	Score	
Round 1
Bi Yuxiang (CHN)	0–9	Elizbar Odikadze (GEO)
Thomas Barns (AUS)	0–11	Michael Macchiavello (USA)
Muheite Tuerxunbieke (CHN)	10–0	Radosław Baran (POL)
Samuel Scherrer (SUI)	5–3	Richárd Végh (HUN)
Zbigniew Baranowski (POL)	WO	Mahamed Zakariiev (UKR)
Michał Bielawski (POL)	13–0	Vilius Mikalauskas (LTU)
Erik Thiele (GER)	3–0	Habila Awusayiman (CHN)
Viktor Antypenko (UKR)	2–12	Givi Matcharashvili (GEO)
Round 2
Bi Yuxiang (CHN)	6–3	Thomas Barns (AUS)
Radosław Baran (POL)	10–5	Richárd Végh (HUN)
Zbigniew Baranowski (POL)	WO	Vilius Mikalauskas (LTU)
Habila Awusayiman (CHN)	14–4	Viktor Antypenko (UKR)
Lukas Krasauskas (LTU)	0–10	Elizbar Odikadze (GEO)
Michael Macchiavello (USA)	5–4	Muheite Tuerxunbieke (CHN)
Samuel Scherrer (SUI)	4–7	Mahamed Zakariiev (UKR)
Michał Bielawski (POL)	2–6	Erik Thiele (GER)
Round 3
Bi Yuxiang (CHN)	WO	Radosław Baran (POL)
Zbigniew Baranowski (POL)	WO	Habila Awusayiman (CHN)
Lukas Krasauskas (LTU)	0–11	Muheite Tuerxunbieke (CHN)
Samuel Scherrer (SUI)	0–4	Michał Bielawski (POL)
Givi Matcharashvili (GEO)	3–2	Elizbar Odikadze (GEO)
Round 4
Radosław Baran (POL)	4–5	Habila Awusayiman (CHN)
Muheite Tuerxunbieke (CHN)	9–0	Michał Bielawski (POL)
Givi Matcharashvili (GEO)	8–6	Michael Macchiavello (USA)
Mahamed Zakariiev (UKR)	4–3	Erik Thiele (GER)
Round 5
Elizbar Odikadze (GEO)	11–8	Habila Awusayiman (CHN)
Final III–V
Michael Macchiavello (USA)	1–9	Elizbar Odikadze (GEO)
Muheite Tuerxunbieke (CHN)	7–10	Erik Thiele (GER)
Final I–II
Givi Matcharashvili (GEO)	5–2	Mahamed Zakariiev (UKR)

==== Men's freestyle 125 kg ====
	Score	
Round 1
Dániel Ligeti (HUN)	4–0	Milán Korcsog (HUN)
Kamil Kościółek (POL)	10–4	Gennadij Cudinovic (GER)
Deng Zhiwei (CHN)	9–9	Yurii Idzinskyi (UKR)
Jere Heino (FIN)	0–5	Tony Cassioppi (USA)
Rusidanmu Reheman (CHN)	0–4 Fall	Solomon Manashvili (GEO)
Robert Baran (POL)	4–0	Oleksandr Koldovskyi (UKR)
Round 2
Milán Korcsog (HUN)	6–2	Gennadij Cudinovic (GER)
Deng Zhiwei (CHN)	3–0	Jere Heino (FIN)
Rusidanmu Reheman (CHN)	0–5	Oleksandr Koldovskyi (UKR)
Derek White (USA)	0–7	Dániel Ligeti (HUN)
Kamil Kościółek (POL)	5–2	Yurii Idzinskyi (UKR)
Tony Cassioppi (USA)	18–8	Solomon Manashvili (GEO)
Round 3
Milán Korcsog (HUN)	0–11	Deng Zhiwei (CHN)
Oleksandr Koldovskyi (UKR)	1–1	Derek White (USA)
Yurii Idzinskyi (UKR)	7–6	Solomon Manashvili (GEO)
Robert Baran (POL)	10–7	Dániel Ligeti (HUN)
Kamil Kościółek (POL)	5–10 Fall	Tony Cassioppi (USA)
Round 4
Deng Zhiwei (CHN)	1–2	Derek White (USA)
Final III–V
Dániel Ligeti (HUN)	WO	Yurii Idzinskyi (UKR)
Derek White (USA)	0–11	Kamil Kościółek (POL)
Final I–II
Robert Baran (POL)	3–0	Tony Cassioppi (USA)

=== Men's Greco-Roman (Władysław Pytlasiński Cup) ===
==== Men's Greco-Roman 55 kg ====
	Score	
Round 1
Yu Shiotani (JPN)	7–0	Abdalla Mohamed Shaaban (EGY)
Liu Jiahao (CHN)	4–2	Rudik Mkrtchyan (ARM)
Round 2
Florin Tița (ROU)	0–9	Yu Shiotani (JPN)
Ulan Muratbek Uulu (KGZ)	0–3	Liu Jiahao (CHN)
Round 3
Abdalla Mohamed Shaaban (EGY)	1–9	Florin Tița (ROU)
Rudik Mkrtchyan (ARM)	8–0	Ulan Muratbek Uulu (KGZ)
Final III–V
Florin Tița (ROU)	0–8	Ulan Muratbek Uulu (KGZ)
Rudik Mkrtchyan (ARM)	5–1	Abdalla Mohamed Shaaban (EGY)
Final I–II
Yu Shiotani (JPN)	5–2	Liu Jiahao (CHN)

==== Men's Greco-Roman 60 kg ====
	Score	
Round 1
Gevorg Gharibyan (ARM)	3–1	Mostafa Rezaei (IRI)
Ahmed Bagdouda (EGY)	2–2	Krisztián Kecskeméti (HUN)
Zholaman Sharshenbekov (KGZ)	11–2	Cao Liguo (CHN)
Tan Haodong (CHN)	10–1	Viktor Petryk (UKR)
Nedyalko Petrov (BUL)	1–4 Fall	Ardit Fazljija (SWE)
Michał Tracz (POL)	1–1	Haithem Mahmoud (EGY)
Kenichiro Fumita (JPN)	9–0	Chen Wenjie (CHN)
Round 2
Mostafa Rezaei (IRI)	5–0 Fall	Ahmed Bagdouda (EGY)
Cao Liguo (CHN)	8–4 Fall	Viktor Petryk (UKR)
Nedyalko Petrov (BUL)	9–5	Haithem Mahmoud (EGY)
Mateusz Szewczuk (POL)	2–11	Gevorg Gharibyan (ARM)
Krisztián Kecskeméti (HUN)	5–11	Zholaman Sharshenbekov (KGZ)
Tan Haodong (CHN)	1–3	Ardit Fazljija (SWE)
Michał Tracz (POL)	0–11	Kenichiro Fumita (JPN)
Round 3
Chen Wenjie (CHN)	7–6	Mostafa Rezaei (IRI)
Cao Liguo (CHN)	5–3	Nedyalko Petrov (BUL)
Mateusz Szewczuk (POL)	3–4 Fall	Krisztián Kecskeméti (HUN)
Tan Haodong (CHN)	11–0	Michał Tracz (POL)
Gevorg Gharibyan (ARM)	0–9	Zholaman Sharshenbekov (KGZ)
Ardit Fazljija (SWE)	4–4 Fall	Kenichiro Fumita (JPN)
Round 4
Chen Wenjie (CHN)	1–9	Cao Liguo (CHN)
Krisztián Kecskeméti (HUN)	0–11	Tan Haodong (CHN)
Final III–V
Gevorg Gharibyan (ARM)	2–4	Tan Haodong (CHN)
Cao Liguo (CHN)	3–1	Ardit Fazljija (SWE)
Final I–II
Zholaman Sharshenbekov (KGZ)	WO	Kenichiro Fumita (JPN)

==== Men's Greco-Roman 63 kg ====
	Score	
Round 1
Justas Petravičius (LTU)	6–15	Hrachya Poghosyan (ARM)
Ryuto Ikeda (JPN)	6–4	Grzegorz Kunkel (POL)
Aleksandrs Jurkjans (LAT)	4–0	Nikolay Vichev (BUL)
Tynar Sharshenbekov (KGZ)	9–0	Jonas Urs Müller (SUI)
Alexander Bica (SWE)	1–1	Tuo Erbatu (CHN)
Erik Torba (HUN)	4–8	Ali-Asghar Sam Daliri (IRI)
Round 2
Justas Petravičius (LTU)	3–6	Grzegorz Kunkel (POL)
Nikolay Vichev (BUL)	9–1	Jonas Urs Müller (SUI)
Tuo Erbatu (CHN)	9–0	Erik Torba (HUN)
Răzvan Arnăut (ROU)	2–1	Hrachya Poghosyan (ARM)
Ryuto Ikeda (JPN)	4–4 Fall	Aleksandrs Jurkjans (LAT)
Tynar Sharshenbekov (KGZ)	11–2	Alexander Bica (SWE)
Round 3
Grzegorz Kunkel (POL)	0–8	Nikolay Vichev (BUL)
Tuo Erbatu (CHN)	3–1	Hrachya Poghosyan (ARM)
Ryuto Ikeda (JPN)	6–3	Alexander Bica (SWE)
Ali-Asghar Sam Daliri (IRI)	9–5	Răzvan Arnăut (ROU)
Aleksandrs Jurkjans (LAT)	5–5	Tynar Sharshenbekov (KGZ)
Round 4
Nikolay Vichev (BUL)	WO	Tuo Erbatu (CHN)
Final III–V
Răzvan Arnăut (ROU)	13–4	Aleksandrs Jurkjans (LAT)
Nikolay Vichev (BUL)	1–1	Ryuto Ikeda (JPN)
Final I–II
Ali-Asghar Sam Daliri (IRI)	1–3	Tynar Sharshenbekov (KGZ)

==== Men's Greco-Roman 67 kg ====
	Score	
Round 1
Kyotaro Sogabe (JPN)	10–0 Fall	Niklas Öhlén (SWE)
Mihai Mihuț (ROU)	2–5	Mateusz Bernatek (POL)
Aleksander Mielewczyk (POL)	5–3	Ivo Iliev (BUL)
Amantur Ismailov (KGZ)	4–1	Elmer Mattila (FIN)
Slavik Galstyan (ARM)	8–0	Mairbek Salimov (POL)
Abdelrahman Omar (EGY)	0–9	Katsuaki Endo (JPN)
Mate Nemeš (SRB)	3–1	Andreas Vetsch (SUI)
István Váncza (HUN)	6–1	Husiyuetu (CHN)
Round 2
Niklas Öhlén (SWE)	3–9 Fall	Mihai Mihuț (ROU)
Ivo Iliev (BUL)	1–7	Elmer Mattila (FIN)
Mairbek Salimov (POL)	3–8	Abdelrahman Omar (EGY)
Andreas Vetsch (SUI)	0–9	Husiyuetu (CHN)
Kyotaro Sogabe (JPN)	13–4	Mateusz Bernatek (POL)
Aleksander Mielewczyk (POL)	0–9	Amantur Ismailov (KGZ)
Slavik Galstyan (ARM)	9–1 Fall	Katsuaki Endo (JPN)
Mate Nemeš (SRB)	3–1	István Váncza (HUN)
Round 3
Mihai Mihuț (ROU)	4–6	Elmer Mattila (FIN)
Abdelrahman Omar (EGY)	0–9	Husiyuetu (CHN)
Mateusz Bernatek (POL)	8–0	Aleksander Mielewczyk (POL)
Katsuaki Endo (JPN)	7–6 Fall	István Váncza (HUN)
Kyotaro Sogabe (JPN)	14–10 Fall	Amantur Ismailov (KGZ)
Slavik Galstyan (ARM)	9–0	Mate Nemeš (SRB)
Round 4
Elmer Mattila (FIN)	1–3	Husiyuetu (CHN)
Mateusz Bernatek (POL)	5–8 Fall	Katsuaki Endo (JPN)
Final III–V
Amantur Ismailov (KGZ)	3–6	Husiyuetu (CHN)
Katsuaki Endo (JPN)	4–4	Mate Nemeš (SRB)
Final I–II
Kyotaro Sogabe (JPN)	1–8 Fall	Slavik Galstyan (ARM)

==== Men's Greco-Roman 72 kg ====
	Score	
Round 1
Vilius Savickas (LTU)	1–1	Eimantas Vilimas (LTU)
Maurus Zogg (SUI)	0–4 Fall	Sebastian Aak (NOR)
Jakub Bielesz (CZE)	0–7	Gevorg Sahakyan (POL)
Daniel Soini (SWE)	6–1	Randel Uibo (EST)
Bek Konurbaev (KGZ)	1–3	Matias Lipasti (FIN)
Kamil Czarnecki (POL)	3–6	Róbert Fritsch (HUN)
Taishi Horie (JPN)	0–9	Deyvid Dimitrov (BUL)
Kristupas Šleiva (LTU)	5–9 Fall	Shant Khachatryan (ARM)
Round 2
Vilius Savickas (LTU)	4–0	Maurus Zogg (SUI)
Jakub Bielesz (CZE)	15–7	Randel Uibo (EST)
Bek Konurbaev (KGZ)	8–0	Kamil Czarnecki (POL)
Taishi Horie (JPN)	2–11	Kristupas Šleiva (LTU)
Christoffer Dahlén (SWE)	1–3	Eimantas Vilimas (LTU)
Sebastian Aak (NOR)	0–7 Fall	Gevorg Sahakyan (POL)
Daniel Soini (SWE)}	1–1	Matias Lipasti (FIN)
Róbert Fritsch (HUN)	4–0	Deyvid Dimitrov (BUL)
Round 3
Vilius Savickas (LTU)	4–0	Jakub Bielesz (CZE)
Bek Konurbaev (KGZ)	10–0	Kristupas Šleiva (LTU)
Christoffer Dahlén (SWE)	3–7	Sebastian Aak (NOR)
Daniel Soini (SWE)	2–2	Deyvid Dimitrov (BUL)
Shant Khachatryan (ARM)	8–0	Eimantas Vilimas (LTU)
Round 4
Vilius Savickas (LTU)	4–2	Bek Konurbaev (GER)
Sebastian Aak (NOR)	3–13	Deyvid Dimitrov (BUL)
Shant Khachatryan (ARM)	8–4	Gevorg Sahakyan (POL)
Matias Lipasti (FIN)	0–7	Róbert Fritsch (HUN)
Round 5
Eimantas Vilimas (LTU)	3–1	Deyvid Dimitrov (BUL)
Final III–V
Gevorg Sahakyan (POL)	5–2 Fall	Vilius Savickas (LTU)
Eimantas Vilimas (LTU)	2–6	Matias Lipasti (FIN)
Final I–II
Shant Khachatryan (ARM)	6–7	Róbert Fritsch (HUN)

==== Men's Greco-Roman 77 kg ====
	Score	
Round 1
Filip Loch (POL)	1–11	Oliver Krüger (DEN)
Aistis Liaugminas (LTU)	0–8	Akzhol Makhmudov (KGZ)
Liu Rui (CHN)	0–6	Zoltán Lévai (HUN)
Emad Abouelatta (EGY)	3–6	Albin Olofsson (SWE)
Minto Maeda (JPN)	9–0	Omar Okil (EGY)
Maksym Zakharchuk (POL)	0–3	Shohei Yabiku (JPN)
Patryk Bednarz (POL)	1–3	Fabio Dietsche (SUI)
Bahejiang Halishan (CHN)	0–8	Per-Anders Kure (NOR)
Round 2
Filip Loch (POL)	0–8	Aistis Liaugminas (LTU)
Liu Rui (CHN)	0–6	Emad Abouelatta (EGY)
Omar Okil (EGY)	6–15	Maksym Zakharchuk (POL)
Patryk Bednarz (POL)	2–8	Bahejiang Halishan (CHN)
Mohammadali Geraei (IRI)	10–6	Oliver Krüger (DEN)
Akzhol Makhmudov (KGZ)	0–6	Zoltán Lévai (HUN)
Albin Olofsson (SWE)	WO	Minto Maeda (JPN)
Shohei Yabiku (JPN)	7–1	Fabio Dietsche (SUI)
Round 3
Aistis Liaugminas (LTU)	0–9	Emad Abouelatta (EGY)
Maksym Zakharchuk (POL)	3–12	Bahejiang Halishan (CHN)
Oliver Krüger (DEN)	1–9 Fall	Akzhol Makhmudov (KGZ)
Albin Olofsson (SWE)	WO	Fabio Dietsche (SUI)
Per-Anders Kure (NOR)	1–9	Mohammadali Geraei (IRI)
Round 4
Emad Abouelatta (EGY)	1–9	Bahejiang Halishan (CHN)
Akzhol Makhmudov (KGZ)	10–1	Per-Anders Kure (NOR)
Mohammadali Geraei (IRI)	0–9	Zoltán Lévai (HUN)
Minto Maeda (JPN)	7–9 Fall	Shohei Yabiku (JPN)
Round 5
Fabio Dietsche (SUI)	5–9	Bahejiang Halishan (CHN)
Final III–V
Mohammadali Geraei (IRI)	WO	Akzhol Makhmudov (KGZ)
Bahejiang Halishan (CHN)	0–8	Minto Maeda (JPN)
Final I–II
Zoltán Lévai (HUN)	3–1	Shohei Yabiku (JPN)

==== Men's Greco-Roman 82 kg ====
	Score	
Round 1
Wang Chengwu (CHN)	14–6 Fall	Rosian Dermanski (BUL)
Exauce Mukubu (NOR)	9–1	Fares Ghaly (EGY)
Mohammad Hossein Mahmoudi (IRI)	5–1	Roni Purolainen (FIN)
Móric Kismóni (HUN)	1–5	Ranet Kaljola (EST)
Petr Novák (CZE)	9–1	Inelton Bombo (ANG)
Karapet Chalyan (ARM)	8–0	Yuya Okajima (JPN)
Round 2
Rosian Dermanski (BUL)	7–1	Fares Ghaly (EGY)
Roni Purolainen (FIN)	0–8	Móric Kismóni (HUN)
Inelton Bombo (ANG)	0–9	Yuya Okajima (JPN)
Kalidin Asykeev (KGZ)	0–9	Wang Chengwu (CHN)
Exauce Mukubu (NOR)	9–5	Mohammad Hossein Mahmoudi (IRI)
Ranet Kaljola (EST)	2–7 Fall	Petr Novák (CZE)
Round 3
Rosian Dermanski (BUL)	5–3	Móric Kismóni (HUN)
Yuya Okajima (JPN)	3–3	Kalidin Asykeev (KGZ)
Mohammad Hossein Mahmoudi (IRI)	7–0	Petr Novák (CZE)
Karapet Chalyan (ARM)	8–0	Wang Chengwu (CHN)
Exauce Mukubu (NOR)	6–0	Ranet Kaljola (EST)
Round 4
Rosian Dermanski (BUL)	5–4 3C	Yuya Okajima (JPN)
Final III–V
Wang Chengwu (CHN)	4–5	Mohammad Hossein Mahmoudi (IRI)
Rosian Dermanski (BUL)	8–7	Ranet Kaljola (EST)
Final I–II
Karapet Chalyan (ARM)	4–6	Exauce Mukubu (NOR)

==== Men's Greco-Roman 87 kg ====
	Score	
Round 1
Tamás Lévai (HUN)	3–1	Atabek Azisbekov (KGZ)
Zakarias Berg (SWE)	9–0	Stanislav Berkovec (CZE)
Marcel Sterkenburg (NED)	0–9	So Sakabe (JPN)
Waltteri Latvala (FIN)	4–8	Masato Sumi (JPN)
István Takács (HUN)	1–7	Yoan Dimitrov (BUL)
Qian Haitao (CHN)	10–9	Ramon Betschart (SUI)
Dávid Losonczi (HUN)	9–0	Alex Bjurberg Kessidis (SWE)
Damian von Euw (SUI)	3–5	Erik Szilvássy (HUN)
Kareem El-Desouky (EGY)	1–11	Gevorg Tadevosyan (ARM)
Nicu Ojog (ROU)	3–5	Turpal Bisultanov (DEN)
Svetoslav Nikolov (BUL)	4–4	Szymon Szymonowicz (POL)
Round 2
Atabek Azisbekov (KGZ)	8–0	Stanislav Berkovec (CZE)
Marcel Sterkenburg (NED)	3–4	Waltteri Latvala (FIN)
István Takács (HUN)	11–0	Ramon Betschart (SUI)
Alex Bjurberg Kessidis (SWE)	7–2	Damian von Euw (SUI)
Kareem El-Desouky (EGY)	5–9 Fall	Nicu Ojog (ROU)
Christian Zemp (SUI)	2–4	Tamás Lévai (HUN)
Zakarias Berg (SWE)	2–3	So Sakabe (JPN)
Masato Sumi (JPN)	5–6	Yoan Dimitrov (BUL)
Qian Haitao (CHN)	0–9	Dávid Losonczi (HUN)
Erik Szilvássy (HUN)	2–1	Gevorg Tadevosyan (ARM)
Turpal Bisultanov (DEN)	4–4	Svetoslav Nikolov (BUL)
Round 3
Szymon Szymonowicz (POL)	4–3	Atabek Azisbekov (KGZ)
Waltteri Latvala (FIN)	0–5	István Takács (HUN)
Alex Bjurberg Kessidis (SWE)	4–2	Nicu Ojog (ROU)
Christian Zemp (SUI)	1–10	Zakarias Berg (SWE)
Masato Sumi (JPN)	5–8	Qian Haitao (CHN)
Gevorg Tadevosyan (ARM)	10–4	Svetoslav Nikolov (BUL)
Tamás Lévai (HUN)	9–0	So Sakabe (JPN)
Yoan Dimitrov (BUL)	0–9 Fall	Dávid Losonczi (HUN)
Round 4
Szymon Szymonowicz (POL)	WO	István Takács (HUN)
Alex Bjurberg Kessidis (SWE)	7–6	Zakarias Berg (SWE)
Qian Haitao (CHN)	0–9	Gevorg Tadevosyan (ARM)
So Sakabe (JPN)	4–1 Fall	Yoan Dimitrov (BUL)
Tamás Lévai (HUN)	0–9	Dávid Losonczi (HUN)
Erik Szilvássy (HUN)	1–1	Turpal Bisultanov (DEN)
Round 5
Szymon Szymonowicz (POL)	1–5	Alex Bjurberg Kessidis (SWE)
Gevorg Tadevosyan (ARM)	6–4	So Sakabe (JPN)
Final III–V
Tamás Lévai (HUN)	5–1	Gevorg Tadevosyan (ARM)
Alex Bjurberg Kessidis (SWE)	4–4	Erik Szilvássy (HUN)
Final I–II
Dávid Losonczi (HUN)	WO	Turpal Bisultanov (DEN)

==== Men's Greco-Roman 97 kg ====
	Score	
Round 1
Tadeusz Michalik (POL)	5–1	Vilius Laurinaitis (LTU)
Alex Szőke (HUN)	3–1	Aleksandar Stjepanetic (SWE)
Igor Shepetun (POL)	4–9	Tyrone Sterkenburg (NED)
Mohammad Hadi Saravi (IRI)	9–1	Liu Yan (CHN)
Uzur Dzhuzupbekov (KGZ)	8–3	Mathias Bak (DEN)
Mateusz Iwanowski (POL)	0–8	Arvi Savolainen (FIN)
Ondřej Dadák (CZE)	4–11	Oskar Johansson (SWE)
Beksultan Makhmudov (KGZ)	WO	Artur Aleksanyan (ARM)
Mindaugas Venckaitis (LTU)	9–0	Dimitrios Papadopoulos (GRE)
Artur Omarov (CZE)	4–1	Marcus Worren (NOR)
Li Yiming (CHN)	3–1	Zhang Shange (CHN)
Round 2
Vilius Laurinaitis (LTU)	8–3	Aleksandar Stjepanetic (SWE)
Igor Shepetun (POL)	0–9	Liu Yan (CHN)
Mathias Bak (DEN)	8–0 Fall	Mateusz Iwanowski (POL)
Ondřej Dadák (CZE)	WO	Artur Aleksanyan (ARM)
Dimitrios Papadopoulos (GRE)	0–8	Marcus Worren (NOR)
Tadeusz Michalik (POL)	1–3	Alex Szőke (HUN)
Tyrone Sterkenburg (NED)	0–8 Fall	Mohammad Hadi Saravi (IRI)
Uzur Dzhuzupbekov (KGZ)	7–9	Arvi Savolainen (FIN)
Oskar Johansson (SWE)	0–11	Beksultan Makhmudov (KGZ)
Mindaugas Venckaitis (LTU)	3–5	Artur Omarov (CZE)
Round 3
Zhang Shange (CHN)	1–2 Fall	Vilius Laurinaitis (LTU)
Liu Yan (CHN)	2–5	Mathias Bak (DEN)
Ondřej Dadák (CZE)	1–4	Marcus Worren (NOR)
Tadeusz Michalik (POL)	5–1	Tyrone Sterkenburg (NED)
Uzur Dzhuzupbekov (KGZ)	12–1	Oskar Johansson (SWE)
Li Yiming (CHN)	1–3	Alex Szőke (HUN)
Mohammad Hadi Saravi (IRI)	12–1	Arvi Savolainen (FIN)
Round 4
Mindaugas Venckaitis (LTU)	1–2	Vilius Laurinaitis (LTU)
Mathias Bak (DEN)	4–1 Ret	Marcus Worren (NOR)
Tadeusz Michalik (POL)	3–1	Uzur Dzhuzupbekov (KGZ)
Li Yiming (CHN)	3–6	Arvi Savolainen (FIN)
Alex Szőke (HUN)	2–3	Mohammad Hadi Saravi (IRI)
Beksultan Makhmudov (KGZ)	WO	Artur Omarov (CZE)
Round 5
Vilius Laurinaitis (LTU)	2–5	Mathias Bak (DEN)
Tadeusz Michalik (POL)	0–4	Arvi Savolainen (FIN)
Final III–V
Alex Szőke (HUN)	6–4	Mathias Bak (DEN)
Arvi Savolainen (FIN)	WO	Artur Omarov (CZE)
Final I–II
Mohammad Hadi Saravi (IRI)	9–1	Beksultan Makhmudov (KGZ)

==== Men's Greco-Roman 130 kg ====
	Score	
Round 1
Tomasz Wawrzyńczyk (POL)	0–4	Alin Alexuc-Ciurariu (ROU)
Dáriusz Vitek (HUN)	6–5	Romas Fridrikas (LTU)
Rafał Krajewski (POL)	4–5	Meng Lingzhe (CHN)
Arata Sonoda (JPN)	0–9	Roman Kim (KGZ)
Mantas Knystautas (LTU)	3–0 Fall	David Ovasapyan (ARM)
Round 2
Tomasz Wawrzyńczyk (POL)	1–3	Romas Fridrikas (LTU)
Rafał Krajewski (POL)	0–2 Ret	Arata Sonoda (JPN)
Konsta Mäenpää (FIN)	1–1	Alin Alexuc-Ciurariu (ROU)
Dáriusz Vitek (HUN)	0–8	Meng Lingzhe (CHN)
Round 3
David Ovasapyan (ARM)	1–1	Romas Fridrikas (LTU)
Rafał Krajewski (POL)	3–1	Konsta Mäenpää (FIN)
Alin Alexuc-Ciurariu (ROU)	0–8	Meng Lingzhe (CHN)
Roman Kim (KGZ)	0–10	Mantas Knystautas (LTU)
Round 4
Dáriusz Vitek (HUN)	9–0 Fall	Rafał Krajewski (POL)
Final III–V
Alin Alexuc-Ciurariu (ROU)	1–1	Romas Fridrikas (LTU)
Dáriusz Vitek (HUN)	4–6	Roman Kim (KGZ)
Final I–II
Meng Lingzhe (CHN)	2–5	Mantas Knystautas (LTU)

=== Women's freestyle (Poland Open) ===
==== Women's freestyle 50 kg ====
	Score	
Round 1
Weronika Sikora (POL)	0–7	Fan Meng (CHN)
Feng Ziqi (CHN)	10–0 Fall	Amanda Tomczyk (POL)
Szimonetta Szekér (HUN)	8–1	Svetlana Ankicheva (KAZ)
Gabija Dilytė (LTU)	0–10	Oksana Livach (UKR)
Anna Łukasiak (POL)	0–8	Zhu Jiang (CHN)
Round 2
Weronika Sikora (POL)	1–1	Amanda Tomczyk (POL)
Svetlana Ankicheva (KAZ)	5–1	Gabija Dilytė (LTU)
Agata Walerzak (POL)	4–5	Fan Meng (CHN)
Feng Ziqi (CHN)	10–0	Szimonetta Szekér (HUN)
Round 3
Anna Łukasiak (POL)	11–0	Amanda Tomczyk (POL)
Svetlana Ankicheva (KAZ)	0–10	Agata Walerzak (POL)
Fan Meng (CHN)	0–2	Feng Ziqi (CHN)
Oksana Livach (UKR)	5–5	Zhu Jiang (CHN)
Round 4
Szimonetta Szekér (HUN)	0–10	Anna Łukasiak (POL)
Final III–V
Fan Meng (CHN)	10–0	Anna Łukasiak (POL)
Agata Walerzak (POL)	3–4	Zhu Jiang (CHN)
Final I–II
Feng Ziqi (CHN)	10–0	Oksana Livach (UKR)

==== Women's freestyle 53 kg ====
	Score	
Round 1
Zhong Yuhong (CHN)	6–1	Lu Ying (CHN)
Luo Lannuan (CHN)	6–6 Fall	Iulia Leorda (MDA)
Khrystyna-Zoryana Demko (UKR)	6–11	Jonna Malmgren (SWE)
Liliia Malanchuk (UKR)	10–0	Ellada Makhyaddinova (KAZ)
Mariana Drăguțan (MDA)	0–2	Katarzyna Krawczyk (POL)
Round 2
Lu Ying (CHN)	WO	Luo Lannuan (CHN)
Khrystyna-Zoryana Demko (UKR)	6–4 Fall	Ellada Makhyaddinova (KAZ)
Zhong Yuhong (CHN)	9–3	Iulia Leorda (MDA)
Round 3
Mariana Drăguțan (MDA)	4–9	Lu Ying (CHN)
Khrystyna-Zoryana Demko (UKR)	5–2	Iulia Leorda (MDA)
Zhong Yuhong (CHN)	13–3	Jonna Malmgren (SWE)
Liliia Malanchuk (UKR)	0–6 3C	Katarzyna Krawczyk (POL)
Final III–V
Jonna Malmgren (SWE)	WO	Lu Ying (CHN)
Khrystyna-Zoryana Demko (UKR)	0–4 Fall	Liliia Malanchuk (UKR)
Final I–II
Zhong Yuhong (CHN)	2–5	Katarzyna Krawczyk (POL)

==== Women's freestyle 55 kg ====
	Score	
Round 1
Oleksandra Khomenets (UKR)	8–2	Andreea Ana (ROU)
Marina Sedneva (KAZ)	5–2	Erika Bognár (HUN)
Ainur Ashimova (KAZ)	4–0 Fall	Wiktoria Karwowska (POL)
Roksana Zasina (POL)	5–0	Mariia Vynnyk (UKR)
Round 2
Andreea Ana (ROU)	7–0 Fall	Erika Bognár (HUN)
Wiktoria Karwowska (POL)	WO	Mariia Vynnyk (UKR)
Oleksandra Khomenets (UKR)	4–6 Fall	Marina Sedneva (KAZ)
Ainur Ashimova (KAZ)	0–10	Roksana Zasina (POL)
Final III–V
Oleksandra Khomenets (UKR)	4–6	Mariia Vynnyk (UKR)
Andreea Ana (ROU)	10–0	Ainur Ashimova (KAZ)
Final I–II
Marina Sedneva (KAZ)	1–13	Roksana Zasina (POL)

==== Women's freestyle 57 kg ====
	Score	
Round 1
Feng Yongxin (CHN)	8–0 Fall	Aizhan Ismagulova (KAZ)
Giullia Penalber (BRA)	5–0 Fall	Magdalena Głodek (POL)
Zhang Qi (CHN)	4–5	Anastasia Nichita (MDA)
Xie Mengyu (CHN)	11–0	Emma Tissina (KAZ)
Tamara Dollák (HUN)	0–2 Fall	Anhelina Łysak (POL)
Angelika Mytkowska (POL)	0–9 Fall	Laura Almaganbetova (KAZ)
Patrycja Gil (POL)	6–0 Fall	Irene Symeonidis (AUS)
Round 2
Aizhan Ismagulova (KAZ)	0–10	Magdalena Głodek (POL)
Zhang Qi (CHN)	2–0 Fall	Emma Tissina (KAZ)
Tamara Dollák (HUN)	14–3	Angelika Mytkowska (POL)
Feng Yongxin (CHN)	8–2	Giullia Penalber (BRA)
Anastasia Nichita (MDA)	11–1	Xie Mengyu (CHN)
Anhelina Łysak (POL)	16–5	Laura Almaganbetova (KAZ)
Round 3
Irene Symeonidis (AUS)	0–10	Magdalena Głodek (POL)
Zhang Qi (CHN)	10–0	Tamara Dollák (HUN)
Giullia Penalber (BRA)	3–3 Fall	Xie Mengyu (CHN)
Patrycja Gil (POL)	2–7	Feng Yongxin (CHN)
Anastasia Nichita (MDA)	9–4	Anhelina Łysak (POL)
Round 4
Laura Almaganbetova (KAZ)	14–6 Fall	Magdalena Głodek (POL)
Zhang Qi (CHN)	3–1	Xie Mengyu (CHN)
Final III–V
Patrycja Gil (POL)	6–0	Laura Almaganbetova (KAZ)
Zhang Qi (CHN)	WO	Anhelina Łysak (POL)
Final I–II
Feng Yongxin (CHN)	4–10	Anastasia Nichita (MDA)

==== Women's freestyle 59 kg ====
	Score	
Round 1
Diana Kayumova (KAZ)	10–0	Jenna Hemiä (FIN)
Jowita Wrzesień (POL)	1–8	Grace Bullen (NOR)
Round 2
Solomiia Vynnyk (UKR)	10–0	Diana Kayumova (KAZ)
Jenna Hemiä (FIN)	4–14	Jowita Wrzesień (POL)
Round 3
Grace Bullen (NOR)	10–0	Diana Kayumova (KAZ)
Jenna Hemiä (FIN)	0–10	Solomiia Vynnyk (UKR)
Round 4
Jowita Wrzesień (POL)	10–0	Diana Kayumova (KAZ)
Grace Bullen (NOR)	2–9	Solomiia Vynnyk (UKR)
Round 5
Jenna Hemiä (FIN)	0–10	Grace Bullen (NOR)
Jowita Wrzesień (POL)	6–3	Solomiia Vynnyk (UKR)

==== Women's freestyle 62 kg ====
	Score	
Round 1
Anna Szél (HUN)	5–6	Iryna Koliadenko (UKR)
Johanna Lindborg (SWE)	7–4	Luo Xiaojuan (CHN)
Ilona Prokopevniuk (UKR)	13–2	Laís Nunes (BRA)
Sun Xinyuan (CHN)	11–0	Natalia Kubaty (POL)
Viktoria Øverby (NOR)	2–5	Irina Kuznetsova (KAZ)
Round 2
Anna Szél (HUN)	0–10	Luo Xiaojuan (CHN)
Laís Nunes (BRA)	10–0	Natalia Kubaty (POL)
Iryna Koliadenko (UKR)	0–4 Ret	Johanna Lindborg (SWE)
Round 3
Viktoria Øverby (NOR)	0–6 Fall	Luo Xiaojuan (CHN)
Laís Nunes (BRA)	WO	Iryna Koliadenko (UKR)
Johanna Lindborg (SWE)	3–8	Ilona Prokopevniuk (UKR)
Sun Xinyuan (CHN)	11–0	Irina Kuznetsova (KAZ)
Final III–V
Johanna Lindborg (SWE)	1–3	Laís Nunes (BRA)
Luo Xiaojuan (CHN)	4–1 Fall	Irina Kuznetsova (KAZ)
Final I–II
Ilona Prokopevniuk (UKR)	3–2	Sun Xinyuan (CHN)

==== Women's freestyle 65 kg ====
	Score	
Round 1
Paulina Danisz (POL)	0–4 Fall	Viktoria Vesso (EST)
Kateryna Zelenykh (UKR)	9–0 Fall	Elma Zeidlere (LAT)
Long Jia (CHN)	6–8	Miwa Morikawa (JPN)
Round 2
Paulina Danisz (POL)	2–9 Fall	Kateryna Zelenykh (UKR)
Viktoria Vesso (EST)	4–0 Fall	Elma Zeidlere (LAT)
Kriszta Incze (ROU)	9–9	Long Jia (CHN)
Round 3
Paulina Danisz (POL)	4–8	Elma Zeidlere (LAT)
Viktoria Vesso (EST)	6–4 Fall	Kateryna Zelenykh (UKR)
Miwa Morikawa (JPN)	10–0	Kriszta Incze (ROU)
Final III–V
Kateryna Zelenykh (UKR)	9–3	Kriszta Incze (ROU)
Long Jia (CHN)	10–0	Elma Zeidlere (LAT)
Final I–II
Viktoria Vesso (EST)	0–5 Fall	Miwa Morikawa (JPN)

==== Women's freestyle 68 kg ====
	Score	
Round 1
Zuzanna Wólczyńska (POL)	0–10	Noémi Szabados (HUN)
Danutė Domikaitytė (LTU)	1–3	Meerim Zhumanazarova (KGZ)
Adéla Hanzlíčková (CZE)	0–10	Rin Miyaji (JPN)
Karolina Kozłowska (POL)	0–4 Fall	Zhou Feng (CHN)
Round 2
Zuzanna Wólczyńska (POL)	0–10	Danutė Domikaitytė (LTU)
Adéla Hanzlíčková (CZE)	8–0 Fall	Karolina Kozłowska (POL)
Alla Belinska (UKR)	6–0 Fall	Noémi Szabados (HUN)
Round 3
Danutė Domikaitytė (LTU)	4–7	Adéla Hanzlíčková (CZE)
Alla Belinska (UKR)	3–4	Meerim Zhumanazarova (KGZ)
Rin Miyaji (JPN)	4–8	Zhou Feng (CHN)
Final III–V
Alla Belinska (UKR)	4–9	Adéla Hanzlíčková (CZE)
Noémi Szabados (HUN)	2–7	Rin Miyaji (JPN)
Final I–II
Meerim Zhumanazarova (KGZ)	4–8	Zhou Feng (CHN)

==== Women's freestyle 72 kg ====
	Score	
Round 1
Patrycja Sperka (POL)	WO	Natalia Strzałka (POL)
Alexandra Zaitseva (KAZ)	0–10 Fall	Alexandra Anghel (ROU)
Round 2
Yangla (CHN)	2–0	Patrycja Sperka (POL)
Natalia Strzałka (POL)	WO	Alexandra Zaitseva (KAZ)
Round 3
Alexandra Anghel (ROU)	4–1	Patrycja Sperka (POL)
Natalia Strzałka (POL)	WO	Yangla (CHN)
Round 4
Alexandra Zaitseva (KAZ)	3–3 Fall	Patrycja Sperka (POL)
Alexandra Anghel (ROU)	0–3	Yangla (CHN)
Round 5
Natalia Strzałka (POL)	WO	Alexandra Anghel (ROU)
Alexandra Zaitseva (KAZ)	0–6	Yangla (CHN)

==== Women's freestyle 76 kg ====
	Score	
Round 1
Anastasiia Osniach (UKR)	5–0 Fall	Cătălina Axente (ROU)
Anastasiya Alpyeyeva (UKR)	2–2	Aiperi Medet Kyzy (KGZ)
Marion Bye (NOR)	2–13	Wang Juan (CHN)
Kamilė Gaučaitė (LTU)	5–13 Fall	Gulmaral Yerkebayeva (KAZ)
Epp Mäe (EST)	10–0	Naomi de Bruine (AUS)
Round 2
Cătălina Axente (ROU)	3–5	Anastasiya Alpyeyeva (UKR)
Marion Bye (NOR)	4–2 Fall	Kamilė Gaučaitė (LTU)
Qiandegenchagan (CHN)	9–8	Anastasiia Osniach (UKR)
Aiperi Medet Kyzy (KGZ)	5–3	Wang Juan (CHN)
Round 3
Naomi de Bruine (AUS)	0–8 Fall	Anastasiya Alpyeyeva (UKR)
Marion Bye (NOR)	0–4 Fall	Anastasiia Osniach (UKR)
Qiandegenchagan (CHN)	0–9	Aiperi Medet Kyzy (KGZ)
Gulmaral Yerkebayeva (KAZ)	1–2	Epp Mäe (EST)
Round 4
Wang Juan (CHN)	6–2	Anastasiya Alpyeyeva (UKR)
Final III–V
Qiandegenchagan (CHN)	3–1	Wang Juan (CHN)
Anastasiia Osniach (UKR)	9–0 Fall	Gulmaral Yerkebayeva (KAZ)
Final I–II
Aiperi Medet Kyzy (KGZ)	1–6	Epp Mäe (EST)
