= 2023 Ibrahim Moustafa Tournament =

- Host city: Alexandria, Egypt
- Dates: 23–26 February 2023
- Stadium: Borg Elarb Sport Hall

Champions
- Freestyle: United States
- Greco-Roman: Georgia
- Women: Ukraine

The 2023 Ibrahim Moustafa Tournament, was a wrestling event held in Alexandria, Egypt between 23 and 26 February 2023. It was held as the second of the ranking series of United World Wrestling in 2023. With an aim to reward wrestlers participating in Ranking Series tournaments, the United World Wrestling will award prize money to the medal winners in all weight classes with a total prize money of 390,000 Swiss Francs. The gold medal winners at the four Ranking Series tournaments in 2023 will receive 1500 Swiss Francs with the silver medallists getting 750 Swiss Francs. The two bronze medallists will receive 500 Swiss Francs each.

== Ranking Series ==
Ranking Series Calendar 2023 of United World Wrestling:

- 1st Ranking Series: 1-5 February, Croatia, Zagreb ⇒ 2023 Grand Prix Zagreb Open
- 2nd Ranking Series: 23-26 February, Egypt, Alexandria ⇒ 2023 Ibrahim Moustafa Tournament
- 3rd Ranking Series: 1-4 June, Kyrgyzstan, Bishkek ⇒ 2023 Kaba Uulu Kozhomkul & Raatbek Sanatbaev Tournament
- 4th Ranking Series: 13-16 July, Hungary, Budapest ⇒ 2023 Polyák Imre & Varga János Memorial Tournament

== Competition schedule ==
All times are (UTC+2)

Date	Time	Event
23 February	10.30-14.30	Qualification rounds & repechage GR 55-60-63-67-87-97-130 kg
23 February	19.00-20.30	Final matches and awarding ceremony: GR 55-60-63-67-87-97-130 kg
24 February	10.30-14.30	Qualification rounds & repechage GR 72-77-82 kg & WW 57-62-68-76 kg
24 February	19.00-20.30	Final matches and awarding ceremony: GR 72-77-82 kg & WW 57-62-68-76 kg
25 February	10.30-14.30	Qualification rounds & repechage WW 50-53-55-59-65-72 kg & FS 97-125 kg
25 February	19.00-20.30	Final matches and awarding ceremony: WW 50-53-55-59-65-72 kg & FS 97-125 kg
26 February	10.30-14.30	Qualification rounds & repechage FS 57-61-65-70-74-79-86-92 kg
26 February	19.00-20.30	Final matches and awarding ceremony: FS 57-61-65-70-74-79-86-92 kg

== Medal table ==
* Host nation (Egypt)

Rank	Nation	Gold	Silver	Bronze	Total
1	United States	4	5	4	13
2	Georgia	4	4	5	13
3	Ukraine	3	5	4	12
4	Turkey	3	2	3	8
5	Kyrgyzstan	3	1	5	9
6	Kazakhstan	2	3	8	13
7	Iran	2	1	1	4
8	China	1	4	5	10
9	Romania	1	1	3	5
10	Armenia	1	0	1	2
10	Ecuador	1	0	1	2
10	Egypt*	1	0	1	2
13	Bulgaria	1	0	0	1
13	Canada	1	0	0	1
13	Italy	1	0	0	1
13	Slovakia	1	0	0	1
17	Poland	0	2	1	3
18	Moldova	0	1	1	2
19	France	0	1	0	1
20	Uzbekistan	0	0	3	3
21	Hungary	0	0	2	2
21	India	0	0	2	2
21	Sweden	0	0	2	2
24	Algeria	0	0	1	1
24	Austria	0	0	1	1
24	Czech Republic	0	0	1	1
24	Germany	0	0	1	1
24	Israel	0	0	1	1
24	Tunisia	0	0	1	1
Totals (29 entries)		30	30	58	118

== Team ranking ==
Rank	Men's freestyle		Men's Greco-Roman		Women's freestyle	
Rank	Team	Points	Team	Points	Team	Points
1	United States	155	Georgia	166	Ukraine	136
2	Ukraine	117	Kazakhstan	161	China	130
3	Georgia	98	Kyrgyzstan	90	United States	120
4	Turkey	90	Egypt	82	Kyrgyzstan	55
5	Kazakhstan	78	Iran	60	India	51
6	Armenia	68	Turkey	60	Egypt	48
7	Kyrgyzstan	67	China	59	Ecuador	46
8	Uzbekistan	67	Romania	52	Germany	43
9	Poland	55	India	49	Kazakhstan	40
10	Iran	45	Sweden	44	Canada	35

== Medal overview ==
=== Men's freestyle ===
Event	Gold	Silver	Bronze
57 kg	Süleyman Atlı; Turkey	Andriy Yatsenko; Ukraine	Bekzat Almaz Uulu; Kyrgyzstan
57 kg	Süleyman Atlı; Turkey	Andriy Yatsenko; Ukraine	Rakhat Kalzhan; Kazakhstan
61 kg	Taiyrbek Zhumashbek Uulu; Kyrgyzstan	Taras Markovych; Ukraine	Arsen Harutyunyan; Armenia
61 kg	Taiyrbek Zhumashbek Uulu; Kyrgyzstan	Taras Markovych; Ukraine	Austin DeSanto; United States
65 kg	Vazgen Tevanyan; Armenia	Joseph McKenna; United States	Erik Arushanian; Ukraine
65 kg	Vazgen Tevanyan; Armenia	Joseph McKenna; United States	Umidjon Jalolov; Uzbekistan
70 kg	Ernazar Akmataliev; Kyrgyzstan	Cody Chittum; United States	Giorgi Elbakidze; Georgia
70 kg	Ernazar Akmataliev; Kyrgyzstan	Cody Chittum; United States	Ihor Nykyforuk; Ukraine
74 kg	Iakub Shikhdzamalov; Romania	Vincenzo Joseph; United States	Mitch Finesilver; Israel
74 kg	Iakub Shikhdzamalov; Romania	Vincenzo Joseph; United States	Soner Demirtaş; Turkey
79 kg	Avtandil Kentchadze; Georgia	Amir Hossein Kavousi; Iran	Chandler Marsteller; United States
79 kg	Avtandil Kentchadze; Georgia	Amir Hossein Kavousi; Iran	Bekzod Abdurakhmonov; Uzbekistan
86 kg	Vasyl Mykhailov; Ukraine	Zahid Valencia; United States	Sebastian Jezierzański; Poland
86 kg	Vasyl Mykhailov; Ukraine	Zahid Valencia; United States	Tariel Gaphrindashvili; Georgia
92 kg	Kollin Moore; United States	Nate Jackson; United States	Feyzullah Aktürk; Turkey
92 kg	Kollin Moore; United States	Nate Jackson; United States	Miriani Maisuradze; Georgia
97 kg	Batyrbek Tsakulov; Slovakia	Zbigniew Baranowski; Poland	Vladislav Baitcaev; Hungary
97 kg	Batyrbek Tsakulov; Slovakia	Zbigniew Baranowski; Poland	Amir Ali Azarpira; Iran
125 kg	Taha Akgül; Turkey	Kamil Kościółek; Poland	Khasanboy Rakhimov; Uzbekistan
125 kg	Taha Akgül; Turkey	Kamil Kościółek; Poland	Yusup Batirmurzaev; Kazakhstan

=== Men's Greco-Roman ===
Event	Gold	Silver	Bronze
55 kg	Amangali Bekbolatov; Kazakhstan	Marlan Mukashev; Kazakhstan	Iskhar Kurbayev; Kazakhstan
55 kg	Amangali Bekbolatov; Kazakhstan	Marlan Mukashev; Kazakhstan	Denis Mihai; Romania
60 kg	Kerem Kamal; Turkey	Yernar Fidakhmetov; Kazakhstan	Haithem Mahmoud; Egypt
60 kg	Kerem Kamal; Turkey	Yernar Fidakhmetov; Kazakhstan	Răzvan Arnăut; Romania
63 kg	Meisam Dalkhani; Iran	Leri Abuladze; Georgia	Dastan Zarlykhanov; Kazakhstan
63 kg	Meisam Dalkhani; Iran	Leri Abuladze; Georgia	Syimyk Makhmudov; Kyrgyzstan
67 kg	Merey Bekenov; Kazakhstan	Joni Khetsuriani; Georgia	Razzak Beishekeev; Kyrgyzstan
67 kg	Merey Bekenov; Kazakhstan	Joni Khetsuriani; Georgia	Husiyuetu; China
72 kg	Ramaz Zoidze; Georgia	Otar Abuladze; Georgia	Ankit Gulia; India
72 kg	Ramaz Zoidze; Georgia	Otar Abuladze; Georgia	Daniyar Kalenov; Kazakhstan
77 kg	Aik Mnatsakanian; Bulgaria	Demeu Zhadrayev; Kazakhstan	Alexandrin Guțu; Moldova
77 kg	Aik Mnatsakanian; Bulgaria	Demeu Zhadrayev; Kazakhstan	Yunus Emre Başar; Turkey
82 kg	Gela Bolkvadze; Georgia	Akylbek Talantbekov; Kyrgyzstan	Abdelkrim Ouakali; Algeria
82 kg	Gela Bolkvadze; Georgia	Akylbek Talantbekov; Kyrgyzstan	Zakarias Berg; Sweden
87 kg	Lasha Gobadze; Georgia	Ali Cengiz; Turkey	Gurami Khetsuriani; Georgia
87 kg	Lasha Gobadze; Georgia	Ali Cengiz; Turkey	Alex Kessidis; Sweden
97 kg	Mohammad Hadi Saravi; Iran	Robert Kobliashvili; Georgia	Artur Omarov; Czech Republic
97 kg	Mohammad Hadi Saravi; Iran	Robert Kobliashvili; Georgia	Markus Ragginger; Austria
130 kg	Abdellatif Mohamed; Egypt	Alin Alexuc-Ciurariu; Romania	Zviadi Pataridze; Georgia
130 kg	Abdellatif Mohamed; Egypt	Alin Alexuc-Ciurariu; Romania	Alimkhan Syzdykov; Kazakhstan

=== Women's freestyle ===
Event	Gold	Silver	Bronze
50 kg	Feng Ziqi; China	Fan Meng; China	Zhu Jiang; China
50 kg	Feng Ziqi; China	Fan Meng; China	Alyssa Lampe; United States
53 kg	Lucía Yépez; Ecuador	Deng Li; China	Andreea Ana; Romania
53 kg	Lucía Yépez; Ecuador	Deng Li; China	Stalvira Orshush; Hungary
55 kg	Jacarra Winchester; United States	Bediha Gün; Turkey	Marina Sedneva; Kazakhstan
55 kg	Jacarra Winchester; United States	Bediha Gün; Turkey	Xie Mengyu; China
57 kg	Alexandria Town; Canada	Alina Hrushyna; Ukraine	Zhang Qi; China
57 kg	Alexandria Town; Canada	Alina Hrushyna; Ukraine	Luisa Valverde; Ecuador
59 kg	Yuliya Tkach; Ukraine	Anastasia Nichita; Moldova	Yulia Leskovets; Ukraine
59 kg	Yuliya Tkach; Ukraine	Anastasia Nichita; Moldova	Zhuomalaga; China
62 kg	Aisuluu Tynybekova; Kyrgyzstan	Luo Xiaojuan; China	Iryna Koliadenko; Ukraine
62 kg	Aisuluu Tynybekova; Kyrgyzstan	Luo Xiaojuan; China	Luisa Niemesch; Germany
65 kg	Tetiana Rizhko; Ukraine	Emma Bruntil; United States	Khadija Jlassi; Tunisia
68 kg	Forrest Molinari; United States	Koumba Larroque; France	Alla Belinska; Ukraine
68 kg	Forrest Molinari; United States	Koumba Larroque; France	Meerim Zhumanazarova; Kyrgyzstan
72 kg	Dalma Caneva; Italy	Alina Levytska; Ukraine	Reetika Hooda; India
76 kg	Kennedy Blades; United States	Wang Juan; China	Elmira Syzdykova; Kazakhstan
76 kg	Kennedy Blades; United States	Wang Juan; China	Aiperi Medet Kyzy; Kyrgyzstan

== Results ==
Legend

- F — Won by fall
- R — Retired
- WO — Won by walkover

=== Men's freestyle ===
==== Men's freestyle 57 kg ====
Legend

- F — Won by fall

Round of 32
	Score	
Nodirjon Safarov (UZB)	4–10	Nick Suriano (USA)
Roberti Dingashvili (GEO)	0–10	Süleyman Atlı (TUR)
Diamantino Iuna Fafé (GBS)	6–7	Li Weiyu (CHN)
Zou Wanhao (CHN)	5–3	Udit Kumar (IND)
Abzal Okenov (KAZ)	10–0	Brandon Escobar (HON)
Darian Cruz (PUR)	5–0	Alaa Ali El-Sayed (EGY)

Round of 16
Beka Bujiashvili (GEO)	10
Yerassyl Mukhtaruly (KAZ)	9
Nick Suriano (USA)	2
Liu Minghu (CHN)	1
Arslan Rakhimov (UZB)	0
Süleyman Atlı (TUR)	11
Li Weiyu (CHN)	2
Rakhat Kalzhan (KAZ)	5
Bekzat Almaz Uulu (KGZ)	3
Zou Wanhao (CHN)	2
Abzal Okenov (KAZ)	10
Almaz Smanbekov (KGZ)	14
Andriy Yatsenko (UKR)	4
Darian Cruz (PUR)	0
Manvel Khndzrtsyan (ARM)	10
Mahmoud El-Azab (EGY)	0

Quarterfinals
Beka Bujiashvili (GEO)	1
Nick Suriano (USA)	2
Süleyman Atlı (TUR)	10
Rakhat Kalzhan (KAZ)	0
Bekzat Almaz Uulu (KGZ)	11
Almaz Smanbekov (KGZ)	9
Andriy Yatsenko (UKR)	10
Manvel Khndzrtsyan (ARM)	5

Semifinals
Nick Suriano (USA)	3
Süleyman Atlı (TUR)	9
Bekzat Almaz Uulu (KGZ)	2
Andriy Yatsenko (UKR)	4

Final
Süleyman Atlı (TUR)	12
Andriy Yatsenko (UKR)	11

Repechage round 1
Roberti Dingashvili (GEO)	12
Arslan Rakhimov (UZB)	6^{R}

Repechage round 2
Roberti Dingashvili (GEO)	2
Rakhat Kalzhan (KAZ)	4
Darian Cruz (PUR)	3
Manvel Khndzrtsyan (ARM)	6

Bronze medals
Rakhat Kalzhan (KAZ)	2
Nick Suriano (USA)	1
Manvel Khndzrtsyan (ARM)	2
Bekzat Almaz Uulu (KGZ)	4

==== Men's freestyle 61 kg ====
Round of 32
	Score	
Nurbolat Abdualiyev (KAZ)	9–2	Gamal Mohamed (EGY)

Round of 16
Mahmoud Shorbagy (EGY)	0
Austin DeSanto (USA)	10
Nurbolat Abdualiyev (KAZ)	3
Ulukbek Zholdoshbekov (KGZ)	8
Joey Silva (PUR)	3
Shota Phartenadze (GEO)	8
Taras Markovych (UKR)	4
Shehabeldin Mohamed (EGY)	0
Jahongirmirza Turobov (UZB)	11
Kamil Kerymov (UKR)	7
Arsen Harutyunyan (ARM)	0
Taiyrbek Zhumashbek Uulu (KGZ)	10
Yasin Rezaei (IRI)	19^{F}
Abdelghani Benatallah (ALG)	8
Vladimir Kudrin (KAZ)	8
Pankaj Malik (IND)	7

Quarterfinals
Austin DeSanto (USA)	17
Ulukbek Zholdoshbekov (KGZ)	6
Shota Phartenadze (GEO)	2
Taras Markovych (UKR)	5
Jahongirmirza Turobov (UZB)	4
Taiyrbek Zhumashbek Uulu (KGZ)	7
Yasin Rezaei (IRI)	20
Vladimir Kudrin (KAZ)	12

Semifinals
Austin DeSanto (USA)	0
Taras Markovych (UKR)	10
Taiyrbek Zhumashbek Uulu (KGZ)	18
Yasin Rezaei (IRI)	6

Final
Taras Markovych (UKR)	2
Taiyrbek Zhumashbek Uulu (KGZ)	9

Repechage round 2
Shehabeldin Mohamed (EGY)	0
Shota Phartenadze (GEO)	2^{F}
Arsen Harutyunyan (ARM)	10
Jahongirmirza Turobov (UZB)	0

Bronze medal match
Shota Phartenadze (GEO)	0
Austin DeSanto (USA)	9^{F}
Arsen Harutyunyan (ARM)	10
Yasin Rezaei (IRI)	0

==== Men's freestyle 65 kg ====
Round of 32
	Score	
Edemi Bolkvadze (GEO)	0–8	Vazgen Tevanyan (ARM)
Sanzhar Mukhtar (KAZ)	3–10	Pat Lugo (USA)
Anthony Ashnault (USA)	8–7	Yuan Shaohua (CHN)
Zouheir Iftene (ALG)	0–10 Fall	Joseph McKenna (USA)
Josh Finesilver (ISR)	0–10	Erik Arushanian (UKR)
Krzysztof Bieńkowski (POL)	2–13	Alibek Osmonov (KGZ)

Round of 16
Agustín Destribats (ARG)	12
Ilyas Amanzholov (KAZ)	9
Vazgen Tevanyan (ARM)	11
Omar Mourad (EGY)	0
Eduard Grigorev (POL)	1
Pat Lugo (USA)	5
Anthony Ashnault (USA)	0
Umidjon Jalolov (UZB)	2
Timur Aitkulov (KAZ)	0
Joseph McKenna (USA)	11
Erik Arushanian (UKR)	10
Yassine Jaa (MAR)	0
Sebastian Rivera (PUR)	15
Alibek Osmonov (KGZ)	7^{R}
Sujeet Kalkal (IND)	6
Abbos Rakhmonov (UZB)	0

Quarterfinals
Agustín Destribats (ARG)	1
Vazgen Tevanyan (ARM)	6
Pat Lugo (USA)	2
Umidjon Jalolov (UZB)	5
Joseph McKenna (USA)	8
Erik Arushanian (UKR)	2
Sebastian Rivera (PUR)	9
Sujeet Kalkal (IND)	7

Semifinals
Vazgen Tevanyan (ARM)	4
Umidjon Jalolov (UZB)	0
Joseph McKenna (USA)	10
Sebastian Rivera (PUR)	2

Final
Vazgen Tevanyan (ARM)	8
Joseph McKenna (USA)	2

Repechage round 1
Edemi Bolkvadze (GEO)	12
Omar Mohamed Mourad (EGY)	0
Zouheir Iftene (ALG)	0
Timur Aitkulov (KAZ)	13

Repechage round 2
Edemi Bolkvadze (GEO)	7
Agustín Destribats (ARG)	6
Timur Aitkulov (KAZ)	4
Erik Arushanian (UKR)	8

Bronze medal match
Edemi Bolkvadze (GEO)	0
Umidjon Jalolov (UZB)	10
Erik Arushanian (UKR)	7
Sebastian Rivera (PUR)	2

==== Men's freestyle 70 kg ====
Round of 16
Cody Chittum (USA)	11
Agudamu (CHN)	1
Fares Mohamed El-Baioumy (EGY)	3
Khaled Mohamed (EGY)	3
Azamat Shagapuly (KAZ)	0
Ihor Nykyforuk (UKR)	10
Ernazar Akmataliev (KGZ)	7
Zafarbek Otakhonov (UZB)	5
Maxim Saculțan (MDA)	0
Giorgi Elbakidze (GEO)	6
Tyler Berger (USA)	2
Arman Andreasyan (ARM)	3
Doszhan Assetov (KAZ)	2
Orozobek Toktomambetov (KGZ)	13

Quarterfinals
Cüneyt Budak (TUR)	3
Cody Chittum (USA)	6
Khaled Mohamed (EGY)	0
Ihor Nykyforuk (UKR)	11
Ernazar Akmataliev (KGZ)	14^{F}
Giorgi Elbakidze (GEO)	7
Arman Andreasyan (ARM)	1
Orozobek Toktomambetov (KGZ)	2

Semifinals
Cody Chittum (USA)	14
Ihor Nykyforuk (UKR)	9
Ernazar Akmataliev (KGZ)	2
Orozobek Toktomambetov (KGZ)	2

Final
Cody Chittum (USA)	0
Ernazar Akmataliev (KGZ)	10

Repechage round 1
Agudamu (CHN)	0
Cüneyt Budak (TUR)	7
Zafarbek Otakhonov (UZB)	0
Giorgi Elbakidze (GEO)	7

Bronze medal match
Cüneyt Budak (TUR)	0
Ihor Nykyforuk (UKR)	10^{F}
Giorgi Elbakidze (GEO)	6
Orozobek Toktomambetov (KGZ)	4

==== Men's freestyle 74 kg ====
Round of 32
	Score	
Darkhan Yessengali (KAZ)	2–7	Iakub Shikhdzamalov (ROU)
Wurenibai Nuerlanbieke (CHN)	0–10	Joey Lavallee (USA)
Soner Demirtaş (TUR)	5–2	Islambek Orozbekov (KGZ)
Luis Barrios (HON)	0–12	Vincenzo Joseph (USA)
Semen Radulov (UKR)	10–0	Francisco Kadima (ANG)
Amr Reda Hussen (EGY)	11–2	Nurlan Bekzhanov (KAZ)
Mitch Finesilver (ISR)	WO	~~Abdelkader Ikkal (ALG)~~

Round of 16
Xia Shengsong (CHN)	4
Mohamed Abdelhady (EGY)	4^{F}
Iakub Shikhdzamalov (ROU)	4
Magomedrasul Asluev (BHR)	0
Sagar Jaglan (IND)	26
Joey Lavallee (USA)	14
Soner Demirtaş (TUR)	5
Hossein Abouzari (IRI)	2
Anthony Valencia (MEX)	5
Vincenzo Joseph (USA)	12
Semen Radulov (UKR)	6
Kanat Mussabekov (KAZ)	4
Hrayr Alikhanyan (ARM)	6
Amr Reda Hussen (EGY)	6
Mitch Finesilver (ISR)	10
Josh Shields (USA)	2

Quarterfinals
Mohamed Abdelhady (EGY)	0
Iakub Shikhdzamalov (ROU)	10
Sagar Jaglan (IND)	0
Soner Demirtaş (TUR)	6
Vincenzo Joseph (USA)	11
Semen Radulov (UKR)	0
Amr Reda Hussen (EGY)	6
Mitch Finesilver (ISR)	9

Semifinals
Iakub Shikhdzamalov (ROU)	4
Soner Demirtaş (TUR)	3
Vincenzo Joseph (USA)	8
Mitch Finesilver (ISR)	3

Final
Iakub Shikhdzamalov (ROU)	WO
Vincenzo Joseph (USA)

Repechage round 1
Darkhan Yessengali (KAZ)	2
Magomedrasul Asluev (BHR)	1
Luis Barrios (HON)	1
Anthony Valencia (MEX)	2

Repechage round 2
Darkhan Yessengali (KAZ)	6
Mohamed Abdelhady (EGY)	3
Anthony Valencia (MEX)	7
Semen Radulov (UKR)	9

Bronze medal match
Darkhan Yessengali (KAZ)	1
Soner Demirtaş (TUR)	5
Semen Radulov (UKR)	2
Mitch Finesilver (ISR)	7

==== Men's freestyle 79 kg ====
Round of 32
	Score	
Li Peilong (CHN)	1–6	Zhiger Zakirov (KAZ)
Ahmed Khaled Mohamed (EGY)	0–5	Bibarys Nuryllauly (KAZ)
Evan Wick (USA)	14–4	Evsem Shvelidze (GEO)

Round of 16
David McFadden (USA)	9
Nasser Sayed (EGY)	6
Zhiger Zakirov (KAZ)	2
Bekzod Abdurakhmonov (UZB)	7
Pardeep (IND)	0
Arman Avagyan (ARM)	11
Georgios Kougioumtsidis (GRE)	6
Avtandil Kentchadze (GEO)	9
Amir Hossein Kavousi (IRI)	10
Chemseddine Fetairia (ALG)	0
Bibarys Nuryllauly (KAZ)	0
Chance Marsteller (USA)	10
Sofiane Padiou Belmir (MAR)	0
Evan Wick (USA)	11
Achsarbek Gulajev (SVK)	0
Bolat Sakayev (KAZ)	5

Quarterfinals
David McFadden (USA)	1
Bekzod Abdurakhmonov (UZB)	10
Arman Avagyan (ARM)	2
Avtandil Kentchadze (GEO)	12
Amir Hossein Kavousi (IRI)	5
Chance Marsteller (USA)	2
Evan Wick (USA)	6
Bolat Sakayev (KAZ)	8

Semifinals
Bekzod Abdurakhmonov (UZB)	5
Avtandil Kentchadze (GEO)	10
Amir Hossein Kavousi (IRI)	8
Bolat Sakayev (KAZ)	6

Final
Avtandil Kentchadze (GEO)	10
Amir Hossein Kavousi (IRI)	7

Repechage round 2
Georgios Kougioumtsidis (GRE)	7
Arman Avagyan (ARM)	13
Chemseddine Fetairia (ALG)	0
Chance Marsteller (USA)	11

Bronze medal match
Arman Avagyan (ARM)	2
Bekzod Abdurakhmonov (UZB)	4
Chance Marsteller (USA)	2
Bolat Sakayev (KAZ)	1

==== Men's freestyle 86 kg ====
Round of 32
	Score	
Nurtilek Karypbaev (KGZ)	2–3	Pedro Ceballos (VEN)
Bobur Islomov (UZB)	6–4	Jonty Bhati (IND)

Round of 16
Vasyl Mykhailov (UKR)	7
Boris Makoev (SVK)	5
Pedro Ceballos (VEN)	2
Islyambek Ilyassov (KAZ)	3
Tariel Gaphrindashvili (GEO)	8
Ivan Ichizli (MDA)	5
Saad Amandar (MAR)	0
Sun Xiao (CHN)	10
Lin Zushen (CHN)	4
Ethan Ramos (PUR)	14
Saifeldin Elkoumy (EGY)	4^{F}
Fateh Benferdjallah (ALG)	0
Mahmoud Badawi (EGY)	0
Bobur Islomov (UZB)	7
Sebastian Jezierzański (POL)	0
Zahid Valencia (USA)	12

Quarterfinals
Vasyl Mykhailov (UKR)	6
Islyambek Ilyassov (KAZ)	0
Tariel Gaphrindashvili (GEO)	2^{F}
Sun Xiao (CHN)	0
Ethan Ramos (PUR)	11
Saifeldin Elkoumy (EGY)	6
Bobur Islomov (UZB)	0
Zahid Valencia (USA)	7

Semifinals
Vasyl Mykhailov (UKR)	6
Tariel Gaphrindashvili (GEO)	4
Ethan Ramos (PUR)	0
Zahid Valencia (USA)	10

Final
Vasyl Mykhailov (UKR)	8
Zahid Valencia (USA)	6

Repechage round 2
Boris Makoev (SVK)	11
Islyambek Ilyassov (KAZ)	0
Sebastian Jezierzański (POL)	4
Bobur Islomov (UZB)	0

Bronze medal match
Boris Makoev (SVK)	2
Tariel Gaphrindashvili (GEO)	13
Sebastian Jezierzański (POL)	11
Ethan Ramos (PUR)	8

==== Men's freestyle 92 kg ====
Round of 16
Mohamed Wael Abdelwahab (EGY)	1
Abdulkareem Abuidaij (JOR)	4
Feyzullah Aktürk (TUR)	2
Nate Jackson (USA)	5
Illia Archaia (UKR)	0
Magomed Sharipov (BHR)	6^{F}

Quarterfinals
Khaled El-Moatamadawi (EGY)	5
Abdulkareem Abuidaij (JOR)	0
Kollin Moore (USA)	12
Miriani Maisuradze (GEO)	2
Prithviraj Patil (IND)	0
Nate Jackson (USA)	10
Magomed Sharipov (BHR)	2
Rizabek Aitmukhan (KAZ)	5^{F}

Semifinals
Khaled El-Moatamadawi (EGY)	1
Kollin Moore (USA)	11
Nate Jackson (USA)	8
Rizabek Aitmukhan (KAZ)	2

Final
Kollin Moore (USA)	WO
Nate Jackson (USA)

Repechage round 1
Feyzullah Aktürk (TUR)	10
Prithviraj Patil (IND)	0

Bronze medal match
Miriani Maisuradze (GEO)	10
Khaled El-Moatamadawi (EGY)	0
Feyzullah Aktürk (TUR)	10
Rizabek Aitmukhan (KAZ)	0

==== Men's freestyle 97 kg ====
Round of 32
	Score	
Akhmed Tazhudinov (BHR)	8–2	Givi Matcharashvili (GEO)
Zbigniew Baranowski (POL)	2–0	Murazi Mchedlidze (UKR)
Aboubakr Gadelmawla (EGY)	2–6	Muheite Tuerxunbieke (CHN)

Round of 16
Sahil Una (IND)	0
Vladislav Baitcaev (HUN)	10
Akhmed Tazhudinov (BHR)	8
Habila Awusayiman (CHN)	5
Radu Lefter (MDA)	0
Batyrbek Tsakulov (SVK)	10
Morgan Smith (USA)	0
Ben Honis (ITA)	10
Radosław Baran (POL)	2
Bekzat Urkimbay (KAZ)	3
Zbigniew Baranowski (POL)	4
Serik Bakytkhanov (KAZ)	3
Makhsud Veysalov (UZB)	10
Muheite Tuerxunbieke (CHN)	0
Amir Hossein Firouzpour (IRI)	9
Mostafa El-Ders (EGY)	0

Quarterfinals
Vladislav Baitcaev (HUN)	6
Akhmed Tazhudinov (BHR)	4
Batyrbek Tsakulov (SVK)	10
Ben Honis (ITA)	3
Bekzat Urkimbay (KAZ)	4
Zbigniew Baranowski (POL)	10
Maksud Veysalov (UZB)	4
Amir Hossein Firouzpour (IRI)	11

Semifinals
Vladislav Baitcaev (HUN)	4
Batyrbek Tsakulov (SVK)	4
Zbigniew Baranowski (POL)	6
Amir Hossein Firouzpour (IRI)	4

Final
Batyrbek Tsakulov (SVK)	7
Zbigniew Baranowski (POL)	1

Repechage round 1
Murazi Mchedlidze (UKR)	12
Serik Bakytkhanov (KAZ)	1

Repechage round 2
Radu Lefter (MDA)	3
Ben Honis (ITA)	9
Murazi Mchedlidze (UKR)	1
Bekzat Urkimbay (KAZ)	1

Bronze medals
Ben Honis (ITA)	0
Vladislav Baitcaev (HUN)	8
Murazi Mchedlidze (UKR)	0
Amir Hossein Firouzpour (IRI)	7

==== Men's freestyle 125 kg ====
Round of 16
Duan Benxin (CHN)	11
Mohamed Salaheldin (EGY)	0
José Daniel Díaz (VEN)	2
Sardorbek Kholmatov (UZB)	4
Kamil Kościółek (POL)	6
Khasanboy Rakhimov (UZB)	4
Dinesh Dhankar (IND)	WO
~~Adham Abdelkarim (EGY)~~
Taha Akgül (TUR)	7
Yusup Batirmurzaev (KAZ)	0
Robert Baran (POL)	3
Jordan Wood (USA)	2
Dániel Ligeti (HUN)	2
Nick Gwiazdowski (USA)	8

Quarterfinals
Rusidanmu Reheman (CHN)	2
Duan Benxin (CHN)	4
Sardorbek Kholmatov (UZB)	0
Kamil Kościółek (POL)	7
Dinesh Dhankar (IND)	0
Taha Akgül (TUR)	11
Robert Baran (POL)	4
Nick Gwiazdowski (USA)	8

Semifinals
Duan Benxin (CHN)	0
Kamil Kościółek (POL)	10
Taha Akgül (TUR)	7
Nick Gwiazdowski (USA)	2

Final
Kamil Kościółek (POL)	0
Taha Akgül (TUR)	5

Repechage round 1
Khasanboy Rakhimov (UZB)	7
Sardorbek Kholmatov (UZB)	2
Yusup Batirmurzaev (KAZ)	4^{F}
Dinesh Dhankar (IND)	0

Bronze medal match
Khasanboy Rakhimov (UZB)	6
Duan Benxin (CHN)	0
Yusup Batirmurzaev (KAZ)	11
Nick Gwiazdowski (USA)	0

=== Men's Greco-Roman ===
==== Men's Greco-Roman 55 kg ====
Round of 16
Nugzari Tsurtsumia (GEO)	4
Marlan Mukashev (KAZ)	13

Quarterfinals
Shaaban Abdellatif (EGY)	0
Marlan Mukashev (KAZ)	8
Iskhar Kurbayev (KAZ)	7
Mohamed Ismail Mohamed (EGY)	1
Sardarbek Konushbaev (KGZ)	0
Amangali Bekbolatov (KAZ)	9
Manjeet Chahar (IND)	0
Denis Mihai (ROU)	5

Semifinals
Marlan Mukashev (KAZ)	4
Iskhar Kurbayev (KAZ)	2
Amangali Bekbolatov (KAZ)	9
Denis Mihai (ROU)	0

Final
Marlan Mukashev (KAZ)	1
Amangali Bekbolatov (KAZ)	6

Repechage round 1
Nugzari Tsurtsumia (GEO)	10
Shaaban Abdellatif (EGY)	1

Bronze medal match
Nugzari Tsurtsumia (GEO)	3
Iskhar Kurbayev (KAZ)	7
Sardarbek Konushbaev (KGZ)	4
Denis Mihai (ROU)	14^{F}

==== Men's Greco-Roman 60 kg ====
Round of 16
Yernar Fidakhmetov (KAZ)	5^{F}
Tan Haodong (CHN)	2
Haithem Mahmoud (EGY)	5
Vikram Kurade (IND)	4
Aibek Sabyrbekov (KAZ)	1
Nursultan Nazarbayev (KAZ)	2
Kerem Kamal (TUR)	9
Răzvan Arnăut (ROU)	0
Cao Liguo (CHN)	5
Pridon Abuladze (GEO)	2
Aslamdzhon Azizov (TJK)	1
Nurmukhammet Abdullaev (KGZ)	10
Mahmoud Farrag Saad (EGY)	0
Ahmed Bagdouda (EGY)	8

Quarterfinals
Abdelkarim Fergat (ALG)	0
Yernar Fidakhmetov (KAZ)	10
Haithem Mahmoud (EGY)	5
Nursultan Nazarbayev (KAZ)	4
Kerem Kamal (TUR)	5
Cao Liguo (CHN)	2
Nurmukhammet Abdullaev (KGZ)	7
Ahmed Bagdouda (EGY)	4

Semifinals
Yernar Fidakhmetov (KAZ)	11
Haithem Mahmoud (EGY)	8
Kerem Kamal (TUR)	8
Nurmukhammet Abdullaev (KGZ)	0

Final
Yernar Fidakhmetov (KAZ)	0
Kerem Kamal (TUR)	9

Repechage round 1
Tan Haodong (CHN)	3
Abdelkarim Fergat (ALG)	1
Răzvan Arnăut (ROU)	8
Cao Liguo (CHN)	0

Bronze medal match
Tan Haodong (CHN)	3
Haithem Mahmoud (EGY)	7
Răzvan Arnăut (ROU)	9
Nurmukhammet Abdullaev (KGZ)	0

==== Men's Greco-Roman 63 kg ====
Round of 16
Adham El-Sayed (EGY)	0
Mukhamedali Mamurbek (KAZ)	8
Leri Abuladze (GEO)	6
Dastan Zarlykhanov (KAZ)	2
Abdeldjebar Djebbari (ALG)	3
Aleksandrs Jurkjans (LAT)	4
Victor Ciobanu (MDA)	8
Ismail Ettalibi (MAR)	0
Meisam Dalkhani (IRI)	7
Syimyk Makhmudov (KGZ)	0
Aker Al-Obaidi (AUT)	1
Madiyar Maltekbayev (KAZ)	4

Quarterfinals
Mostafa Aboelala (EGY)	0
Mukhamedali Mamurbek (KAZ)	9
Leri Abuladze (GEO)	9
Aleksandrs Jurkjans (LAT)	0
Victor Ciobanu (MDA)	0
Meisam Dalkhani (IRI)	4
Madiyar Maltekbayev (KAZ)	4
Nitin (IND)	1

Semifinals
Mukhamedali Mamurbek (KAZ)	1
Leri Abuladze (GEO)	9
Meisam Dalkhani (IRI)	2
Madiyar Maltekbayev (KAZ)	1

Final
Leri Abuladze (GEO)	7
Meisam Dalkhani (IRI)	8

Repechage round 1
Dastan Zarlykhanov (KAZ)	8
Aleksandrs Jurkjans (LAT)	1
Syimyk Makhmudov (KGZ)	11^{F}
Victor Ciobanu (MDA)	4

Bronze medal match
Dastan Zarlykhanov (KAZ)	14
Mukhamedali Mamurbek (KAZ)	4
Syimyk Makhmudov (KGZ)	9
Madiyar Maltekbayev (KAZ)	0

==== Men's Greco-Roman 67 kg ====
Round of 16
Joni Khetsuriani (GEO)	9
Abdelrahman Omar (EGY)	0
Razzak Beishekeev (KGZ)	8
Ishak Ghaiou (ALG)	0
Ashu Bazard (IND)	3
Karanjit Singh (IND)	1
Firuz Mirzoradzhabov (TJK)	0
Dinmukhamed Koshkar (KAZ)	4^{F}
Sultan Assetuly (KAZ)	1
Walihan Sailike (CHN)	3
Merey Bekenov (KAZ)	5
Moustafa Alameldin (EGY)	3
Niklas Öhlén (SWE)	5
Mihai Mihuț (ROU)	5
Emad Ghaly (EGY)	1
Husiyuetu (CHN)	10

Quarterfinals
Joni Khetsuriani (GEO)	10
Razzak Beishekeev (KGZ)	3
Ashu Bazard (IND)	7^{F}
Dinmukhamed Koshkar (KAZ)	6
Walihan Sailike (CHN)	1
Merey Bekenov (KAZ)	7
Niklas Öhlén (SWE)	0
Husiyuetu (CHN)	12

Semifinals
Joni Khetsuriani (GEO)	9
Ashu Bazard (IND)	0
Merey Bekenov (KAZ)	9
Husiyuetu (CHN)	7

Final
Joni Khetsuriani (GEO)	3
Merey Bekenov (KAZ)	3

Repechage round 1
Abdelrahman Omar (EGY)	3
Razzak Beishekeev (KGZ)	6
Moustafa Alameldin (EGY)	8^{F}
Walihan Sailike (CHN)	1

Bronze medal match
Razzak Beishekeev (KGZ)	8
Ashu Bazard (IND)	0
Moustafa Alameldin (EGY)	2
Husiyuetu (CHN)	3

==== Men's Greco-Roman 72 kg ====
Round of 16
Nurzhigit Keneshbek Uulu (KGZ)	1
Otar Abuladze (GEO)	10
Sheroz Ochilov (TJK)	10
Yassine Faraj (MAR)	0
Omar Okil (EGY)	1
Mohammad Reza Geraei (IRI)	10
Tan Jian (CHN)	8
Yerassyl Nurbossynov (KAZ)	0
Valentin Petic (MDA)	1
Daniyar Kalenov (KAZ)	1

Quarterfinals
Ankit Gulia (IND)	0
Otar Abuladze (GEO)	9
Sheroz Ochilov (TJK)	3
Mohammad Reza Geraei (IRI)	11
Mahmoud Abdelrahman (EGY)	11
Tan Jian (CHN)	1
Daniyar Kalenov (KAZ)	1
Ramaz Zoidze (GEO)	5^{F}

Semifinals
Otar Abuladze (GEO)	8
Mohammad Reza Geraei (IRI)	0
Mahmoud Abdelrahman (EGY)	6
Ramaz Zoidze (GEO)	8

Final
Otar Abuladze (GEO)	0
Ramaz Zoidze (GEO)	6

Repechage round 1
Nurzhigit Keneshbek Uulu (KGZ)	0
Ankit Gulia (IND)	9

Bronze medal match
Ankit Gulia (IND)	WO
Mohammad Reza Geraei (IRI)
Daniyar Kalenov (KAZ)	4
Mahmoud Abdelrahman (EGY)	1

==== Men's Greco-Roman 77 kg ====
Round of 16
Sachino Davitaia (GEO)	3
Bahejiang Halishan (CHN)	6
Demeu Zhadrayev (KAZ)	11
Alexandrin Guțu (MDA)	1
Iuri Lomadze (GEO)	5
Yryskeldi Maksatbek Uulu (KGZ)	1
Wael Abdelrahman (EGY)	4
Liu Rui (CHN)	11
Mohamed Zahab Khalil (EGY)	WO
~~Shmagi Bolkvadze (GEO)~~
Yunus Emre Başar (TUR)	10
Zoltán Lévai (HUN)	0
Aik Mnatsakanian (BUL)	7
Sajan Bhanwal (IND)	0

Quarterfinals
Albin Olofsson (SWE)	9
Bahejiang Halishan (CHN)	0
Demeu Zhadrayev (KAZ)	9^{F}
Iuri Lomadze (GEO)	3
Liu Rui (CHN)	6
Mohamed Zahab Khalil (EGY)	0
Yunus Emre Başar (TUR)	1
Aik Mnatsakanian (BUL)	3

Semifinals
Albin Olofsson (SWE)	0
Demeu Zhadrayev (KAZ)	9
Liu Rui (CHN)	1
Aik Mnatsakanian (BUL)	1

Final
Demeu Zhadrayev (KAZ)	1
Aik Mnatsakanian (BUL)	1

Repechage round 1
Alexandrin Guțu (MDA)	WO
Iuri Lomadze (GEO)
Sajan Bhanwal (IND)	0
Yunus Emre Başar (TUR)	10

Bronze medal match
Alexandrin Guțu (MDA)	6
Albin Olofsson (SWE)	4
Yunus Emre Başar (TUR)	8
Liu Rui (CHN)	0

==== Men's Greco-Roman 82 kg ====
Round of 16
Mahmoud Ibrahim (EGY)	1
Roland Schwarz (GER)	7
Michael Wagner (AUT)	1
Gela Bolkvadze (GEO)	7
Rohit Dahiya (IND)	1
Zakarias Berg (SWE)	5

Quarterfinals
Shamil Batyrov (KAZ)	2
Roland Schwarz (GER)	5
Akylbek Talantbekov (KGZ)	8
Abdelkrim Ouakali (ALG)	0
Fares Ghaly (EGY)	0
Gela Bolkvadze (GEO)	7
Zakarias Berg (SWE)	3
Dias Kalen (KAZ)	1

Semifinals
Roland Schwarz (GER)	1
Akylbek Talantbekov (KGZ)	8^{F}
Gela Bolkvadze (GEO)	3
Zakarias Berg (SWE)	1

Final
Akylbek Talantbekov (KGZ)	0
Gela Bolkvadze (GEO)	10

Repechage round 1
Michael Wagner (AUT)	7
Fares Ghaly (EGY)	0

Bronze medal match
Abdelkrim Ouakali (ALG)	4
Roland Schwarz (GER)	4
Michael Wagner (AUT)	1
Zakarias Berg (SWE)	1

==== Men's Greco-Roman 87 kg ====
Round of 16
Ali Cengiz (TUR)	5
Abdelrahman El-Sefy (EGY)	2
Gurami Khetsuriani (GEO)	2
Bachir Sid Azara (ALG)	1
Emad Abouelatta (EGY)	3
Wang Chengwu (CHN)	5
Alex Kessidis (SWE)	3
Kaisaier Maimaiti (CHN)	1
Maksat Sailau (KAZ)	1
Nursultan Tursynov (KAZ)	2
Sunil Kumar (IND)	7
Noureldin Hassan (EGY)	5
Luis Avendaño (VEN)	0
Lasha Gobadze (GEO)	4

Quarterfinals
Atabek Azisbekov (KGZ)	1
Ali Cengiz (TUR)	3
Gurami Khetsuriani (GEO)	4
Wang Chengwu (CHN)	0
Alex Kessidis (SWE)	7
Nursultan Tursynov (KAZ)	5
Sunil Kumar (IND)	1
Lasha Gobadze (GEO)	9

Semifinals
Ali Cengiz (TUR)	3
Gurami Khetsuriani (GEO)	3
Alex Kessidis (SWE)	1
Lasha Gobadze (GEO)	1

Final
Ali Cengiz (TUR)	1
Lasha Gobadze (GEO)	10

Repechage round 1
Abdelrahman El-Sefy (EGY)	1
Atabek Azisbekov (KGZ)	8
Luis Avendaño (VEN)	4
Sunil Kumar (IND)	7

Bronze medal match
Atabek Azisbekov (KGZ)	5
Gurami Khetsuriani (GEO)	6
Sunil Kumar (IND)	0
Alex Kessidis (SWE)	9

==== Men's Greco-Roman 97 kg ====
Round of 32
	Score	
Nurmanbet Raimaly Uulu (KGZ)	0–4	Artur Omarov (CZE)
Luillys Pérez (VEN)	1–5	Giorgi Melia (GEO)
Islam Umayev (KAZ)	1–1	Robert Kobliashvili (GEO)
Liu Yan (CHN)	8–0	Aleksandar Stjepanetic (SWE)

Round of 16
Yerulan Iskakov (KAZ)	4
Adem Boudjemline (ALG)	3
Artur Omarov (CZE)	0
Metehan Başar (TUR)	1^{R}
Mohammad Hadi Saravi (IRI)	2
Giorgi Melia (GEO)	0
Tamás Lévai (HUN)	8
Sami Samra (EGY)	0
Mohamed Ali Gabr (EGY)	1
Li Yiming (CHN)	3
Robert Kobliashvili (GEO)	1
Olzhas Syrlybay (KAZ)	1
Daniel Gastl (AUT)	6
Liu Yan (CHN)	2
Markus Ragginger (AUT)	3
Narinder Cheema (IND)	1

Quarterfinals
Yerulan Iskakov (KAZ)	0
Artur Omarov (CZE)	7
Mohammad Hadi Saravi (IRI)	5
Tamás Lévai (HUN)	2
Li Yiming (CHN)	1
Robert Kobliashvili (GEO)	1
Daniel Gastl (AUT)	0
Markus Ragginger (AUT)	3

Semifinals
Artur Omarov (CZE)	2
Mohammad Hadi Saravi (IRI)	5
Robert Kobliashvili (GEO)	1
Markus Ragginger (AUT)	1

Final
Mohammad Hadi Saravi (IRI)	WO
Robert Kobliashvili (GEO)

Repechage round 1
Islam Umayev (KAZ)	1
Olzhas Syrlybay (KAZ)	1

Repechage round 2
Giorgi Melia (GEO)	7
Tamás Lévai (HUN)	4
Olzhas Syrlybay (KAZ)	6
Li Yiming (CHN)	3

Bronze medals
Giorgi Melia (GEO)	4
Artur Omarov (CZE)	9
Olzhas Syrlybay (KAZ)	1
Markus Ragginger (AUT)	5

==== Men's Greco-Roman 130 kg ====
Round of 16
Naveen Sevlia (IND)	1
Meng Lingzhe (CHN)	3
Jello Krahmer (GER)	1
Anton Savenko (KAZ)	4
Alin Alexuc-Ciurariu (ROU)	WO
~~Iakobi Kajaia (GEO)~~

Quarterfinals
Zviadi Pataridze (GEO)	6
Meng Lingzhe (CHN)	0
Mohamed Salaheldin (EGY)	2
Abdellatif Mohamed (EGY)	12
Alimkhan Syzdykov (KAZ)	3
Anton Savenko (KAZ)	1
Alin Alexuc-Ciurariu (ROU)	1
Roman Kim (KGZ)	1

Semifinals
Zviadi Pataridze (GEO)	0
Abdellatif Mohamed (EGY)	6
Alimkhan Syzdykov (KAZ)	0
Alin Alexuc-Ciurariu (ROU)	4

Final
Abdellatif Mohamed (EGY)	3
Alin Alexuc-Ciurariu (ROU)	0

Repechage round 1
~~Iakobi Kajaia (GEO)~~
Roman Kim (KGZ)	WO

Bronze medal match
Mohamed Salaheldin (EGY)	0
Zviadi Pataridze (GEO)	8
Roman Kim (KGZ)	1
Alimkhan Syzdykov (KAZ)	5

=== Women's freestyle ===
==== Women's freestyle 50 kg ====
Round of 16
Alyssa Lampe (USA)	8^{F}
Jasmina Immaeva (UZB)	2
Nada Medani (EGY)	4
Fan Meng (CHN)	11^{F}
Alina Vuc (ROU)	3
Madison Parks (CAN)	9
Zhu Jiang (CHN)	4
Aktenge Keunimjaeva (UZB)	2
Feng Ziqi (CHN)	15
Oksana Livach (UKR)	4

Quarterfinals
Sarra Hamdi (TUN)	0
Alyssa Lampe (USA)	7^{F}
Fan Meng (CHN)	7
Madison Parks (CAN)	1
Patricia Bermúdez (ARG)	0
Zhu Jiang (CHN)	10
Feng Ziqi (CHN)	13
Evin Demirhan (TUR)	2

Semifinals
Alyssa Lampe (USA)	0
Fan Meng (CHN)	11
Zhu Jiang (CHN)	2
Feng Ziqi (CHN)	12

Final
Fan Meng (CHN)	1
Feng Ziqi (CHN)	12

Repechage round 1
Nada Medani (EGY)	1
Madison Parks (CAN)	6
Oksana Livach (UKR)	6
Evin Demirhan (TUR)	2

Bronze medal match
Madison Parks (CAN)
Alyssa Lampe (USA)	WO
Oksana Livach (UKR)	1
Zhu Jiang (CHN)	4

==== Women's freestyle 53 kg ====
Round of 32
	Score	
Betzabeth Argüello (VEN)	2–9	Andreea Ana (ROU)
Shaimaa Khalifa (EGY)	0–10 Fall	Stalvira Orshush (HUN)

Round of 16
Annika Wendle (GER)	9
Shokhida Akhmedova (UZB)	3
Andreea Ana (ROU)	5
Zhong Yuhong (CHN)	0
Lucía Yépez (ECU)	8^{F}
Nethmi Poruthotage (SRI)	0
Nina Hemmer (GER)	4^{F}
Shaimaa Atef Mohamed (EGY)	0
Marina Rueda (ESP)	0
Deng Li (CHN)	10
Anastasia Blayvas (GER)	8^{F}
Dilshoda Matnazarova (UZB)	0
Iulia Leorda (MDA)	2
Stalvira Orshush (HUN)	4
Jonna Malmgren (SWE)	4
Dominique Parrish (USA)	2

Quarterfinals
Annika Wendle (GER)	2
Andreea Ana (ROU)	9
Lucía Yépez (ECU)	11
Nina Hemmer (GER)	3
Deng Li (CHN)	14
Anastasia Blayvas (GER)	4
Stalvira Orshush (HUN)	11
Jonna Malmgren (SWE)	0

Semifinals
Andreea Ana (ROU)	0
Lucía Yépez (ECU)	2
Deng Li (CHN)	1
Stalvira Orshush (HUN)	1

Final
Lucía Yépez (ECU)	9
Deng Li (CHN)	4

Repechage round 2
Nethmi Poruthotage (SRI)	0
Nina Hemmer (GER)	11
Marina Rueda (ESP)	0
Anastasia Blayvas (GER)	10

Bronze medal match
Nina Hemmer (GER)	2
Andreea Ana (ROU)	11
Anastasia Blayvas (GER)	4
Stalvira Orshush (HUN)	9

==== Women's freestyle 55 kg ====
Quarterfinals		Semifinals		Final
Bediha Gün (TUR)	WO
Sushma Shokeen (IND)		Bediha Gün (TUR)	4^{F}
Marina Sedneva (KAZ)	6	Marina Sedneva (KAZ)	0
Alexandra Hedrick (USA)	2			Bediha Gün (TUR)	0
Jacarra Winchester (USA)	10			Jacarra Winchester (USA)	9
Tatiana Debien (FRA)	0	Jacarra Winchester (USA)	4
Louji Walid Yassin (EGY)	0	Xie Mengyu (CHN)	0
Xie Mengyu (CHN)	11

Bronze medal match
Sushma Shokeen (IND)
Marina Sedneva (KAZ)	WO
Tatiana Debien (FRA)	4
Xie Mengyu (CHN)	7

==== Women's freestyle 57 kg ====
Round of 16
Zhang Qi (CHN)	11
Amanda Martinez (USA)	1
Alina Hrushyna (UKR)	4^{F}
Sandra Paruszewski (GER)	0
Laylokhon Sobirova (UZB)	2
Giullia Penalber (BRA)	4
Sito (IND)	0
Evelina Nikolova (BUL)	4^{F}
Feng Yongxin (CHN)	7
Elvira Kamaloğlu (TUR)	2
Alexandria Town (CAN)	12
Elena Brugger (GER)	4

Quarterfinals
Hana Ali Hussein (EGY)	0
Zhang Qi (CHN)	7
Alina Hrushyna (UKR)	11
Giullia Penalber (BRA)	0
Evelina Nikolova (BUL)	3
Feng Yongxin (CHN)	2
Alexandria Town (CAN)	14
Luisa Valverde (ECU)	2

Semifinals
Zhang Qi (CHN)	1
Alina Hrushyna (UKR)	7
Evelina Nikolova (BUL)	1
Alexandria Town (CAN)	9^{F}

Final
Alina Hrushyna (UKR)
Alexandria Town (CAN)	WO

Repechage round 1
Sandra Paruszewski (GER)	1
Giullia Penalber (BRA)	10
Elena Brugger (GER)	1
Luisa Valverde (ECU)	3^{F}

Bronze medal match
Giullia Penalber (BRA)	1
Zhang Qi (CHN)	9
Luisa Valverde (ECU)	10
Evelina Nikolova (BUL)	5

==== Women's freestyle 59 kg ====
Round of 16
Anastasia Nichita (MDA)	10^{F}
Farah Ali Hussein (EGY)	0

Quarterfinals
Yulia Leskovets (UKR)	3
Anastasia Nichita (MDA)	10
Alaa Abdelhalim (EGY)	0
Simran Kaur (IND)	12
Dawlat Mohamed (EGY)	0
Zhuomalaga (CHN)	10
Yuliya Tkach (UKR)	4^{F}
Diana Kayumova (KAZ)	0

Semifinals
Anastasia Nichita (MDA)	10
Simran Kaur (IND)	0
Zhuomalaga (CHN)	0
Yuliya Tkach (UKR)	4

Final
Anastasia Nichita (MDA)	2
Yuliya Tkach (UKR)	3

Repechage round 1
Farah Ali Hussein (EGY)	0
Yulia Leskovets (UKR)	8^{F}

Bronze medal match
Yulia Leskovets (UKR)	4^{F}
Simran Kaur (IND)	0
Diana Kayumova (KAZ)	0
Zhuomalaga (CHN)	11

==== Women's freestyle 62 kg ====
Round of 32
	Score	
Nathaly Grimán (VEN)	6–9	Ilona Prokopevniuk (UKR)
Jennifer Rogers (USA)	11–11	Grace Bullen (NOR)
Esther Kolawole (NGR)	10–0	Dilfuza Aimbetova (UZB)
Irina Kuznetsova (KAZ)	7–2	Noura Khalil (EGY)
Ariukhan Jumabaeva (UZB)	1–6 Fall	Luo Xiaojuan (CHN)
Mimi Hristova (BUL)	10–0	Sumitra (IND)
Gharam Mahmoud (EGY)	0–10	Johanna Lindborg (SWE)

Round of 16
Améline Douarre (FRA)	0
Aisuluu Tynybekova (KGZ)	7
Ilona Prokopevniuk (UKR)	4
Kayla Miracle (USA)	5
Bilyana Dudova (BUL)	3
Grace Bullen (NOR)	6
Esther Kolawole (NGR)	0
Iryna Koliadenko (UKR)	10
Luisa Niemesch (GER)	9
Irina Kuznetsova (KAZ)	4
Luo Xiaojuan (CHN)	5
Kriszta Incze (ROU)	1
Laís Nunes (BRA)	2
Mimi Hristova (BUL)	8^{F}
Johanna Lindborg (SWE)	10
Mariana Cherdivara (MDA)	0

Quarterfinals
Aisuluu Tynybekova (KGZ)	10
Kayla Miracle (USA)	0
Grace Bullen (NOR)	12
Iryna Koliadenko (UKR)	14
Luisa Niemesch (GER)	3
Luo Xiaojuan (CHN)	6
Mimi Hristova (BUL)	3
Johanna Lindborg (SWE)	3

Semifinals
Aisuluu Tynybekova (KGZ)	2
Iryna Koliadenko (UKR)	0
Luo Xiaojuan (CHN)	6
Johanna Lindborg (SWE)	4

Final
Aisuluu Tynybekova (KGZ)	3
Luo Xiaojuan (CHN)	2

Repechage round 1
Ariukhan Jumabaeva (UZB)	1
Kriszta Incze (ROU)	3

Repechage round 2
Améline Douarre (FRA)	6
Kayla Miracle (USA)	10
Kriszta Incze (ROU)	1
Luisa Niemesch (GER)	12

Bronze medals
Kayla Miracle (USA)	0
Iryna Koliadenko (UKR)	4^{F}
Luisa Niemesch (GER)	9
Johanna Lindborg (SWE)	0

==== Women's freestyle 65 kg ====
Pos	Athlete	Pld	W	L	CP	TP	UKR	USA	TUN	EGY	IND
1	Tetiana Rizhko (UKR)	4	4	0	15	34	—	6–2	10–1	10–0	8–0 Fall
2	Emma Bruntil (USA)	4	3	1	15	25	1–3 VPO1	—	12–1	6–0 Fall	5–2 Fall
3	Khadija Jlassi (TUN)	4	1	3	8	11	1–3 VPO1	1–4 VSU1	—	7–1 Fall	2–2
4	Ayatalla Magdy (EGY)	4	1	3	5	9	0–4 VSU	0–5 VFA	0–5 VFA	—	8–2 Fall
5	Bhateri Lakhwan (IND)	4	1	3	3	6	0–5 VFA	0–5 VFA	3–1 VPO1	0–5 VFA	—

Source: Ibrahim Moustafa 2023

==== Women's freestyle 68 kg ====
Round of 32
	Score	
Sofia Georgieva (BUL)	0–4 Fall	Alla Belinska (UKR)
Forrest Molinari (USA)	4–0 Fall	Saidy Chávez (HON)

Round of 16
Koumba Larroque (FRA)	3
Buse Tosun Çavuşoğlu (TUR)	2
Alla Belinska (UKR)	7^{F}
Yelena Shalygina (KAZ)	0
Adéla Hanzlíčková (CZE)	6
Menatalla Badran (EGY)	0
Firuza Esenbaeva (UZB)	2
Radhika Jaglan (IND)	6
Soleymi Caraballo (VEN)	15
Samah Abdellatif (EGY)	4
Alexandra Anghel (ROU)	0
Alexandria Glaudé (USA)	6^{F}
Marilyn Garcia (USA)	0
Forrest Molinari (USA)	8^{F}
Yuliana Yaneva (BUL)	0
Meerim Zhumanazarova (KGZ)	2

Quarterfinals
Koumba Larroque (FRA)	3
Alla Belinska (UKR)	2
Adéla Hanzlíčková (CZE)	7
Radhika Jaglan (IND)	7
Soleymi Caraballo (VEN)	3
Alexandria Glaudé (USA)	4
Forrest Molinari (USA)	6
Meerim Zhumanazarova (KGZ)	3

Semifinals
Koumba Larroque (FRA)	6
Adéla Hanzlíčková (CZE)	1
Alexandria Glaudé (USA)	0
Forrest Molinari (USA)	6^{F}

Final
Koumba Larroque (FRA)	2
Forrest Molinari (USA)	13

Repechage round 1
Saidy Chávez (HON)	2
Marilyn Garcia (USA)	4

Repechage round 2
Buse Tosun Çavuşoğlu (TUR)	5
Alla Belinska (UKR)	7
Marilyn Garcia (USA)	0
Meerim Zhumanazarova (KGZ)	12

Bronze medals
Alla Belinska (UKR)	6^{F}
Adéla Hanzlíčková (CZE)	1
Meerim Zhumanazarova (KGZ)	2^{F}
Alexandria Glaudé (USA)	1

==== Women's freestyle 72 kg ====
Pos	Athlete	Pld	W	L	CP	TP	UKR	ITA	EGY	EGY
1	Alina Levytska (UKR)	3	3	0	11	18	—	4–2	11–5	3–0 Fall
2	Dalma Caneva (ITA)	3	2	1	10	18	1–3 VPO1	—	6–0 Fall	10–0
3	Mona Reda (EGY)	3	1	2	4	7	1–3 VPO1	0–5 VFA	—	2–1
4	Eman Hany (EGY)	3	0	3	1	1	0–5 VFA	0–4 VSU	1–3 VPO1	—

Source: Ibrahim Moustafa 2023

Pos	Athlete	Pld	W	L	CP	TP	IND	GER	UZB
1	Reetika Hooda (IND)	2	2	0	8	23	—	10–0	13–2
2	Lilly Schneider (GER)	2	1	1	5	7	0–4 VSU	—	7–4 Fall
3	Svetlana Oknazarova (UZB)	2	0	2	1	6	1–4 VSU1	0–5 VFA	—

Source: Ibrahim Moustafa 2023

Semifinals
Alina Levytska (UKR)	5
Lilly Schneider (GER)	5
Reetika Hooda (IND)	1
Dalma Caneva (ITA)	2^{F}

Final
Alina Levytska (UKR)	2
Dalma Caneva (ITA)	5
Bronze medal
Lilly Schneider (GER)	0
Reetika Hooda (IND)	10

==== Women's freestyle 76 kg ====
Round of 16
Elmira Syzdykova (KAZ)	7
Cynthia Vescan (FRA)	1
Gulmaral Yerkebayeva (KAZ)
Wang Juan (CHN)	WO
Epp Mäe (EST)	1
Kiran Bishnoi (IND)	9
Anastasiia Osniach (UKR)	8^{F}
Skylar Grote (USA)	2
Zhou Qian (CHN)	2
Kennedy Blades (USA)	11
Ozoda Zaripboeva (UZB)	0
Génesis Reasco (ECU)	10
Francy Rädelt (GER)	0
Aiperi Medet Kyzy (KGZ)	11
Samar Amer (EGY)	5
María Acosta (VEN)	0

Quarterfinals
Elmira Syzdykova (KAZ)	1
Wang Juan (CHN)	3
Kiran Bishnoi (IND)	3
Anastasiia Osniach (UKR)	2
Kennedy Blades (USA)	4
Génesis Reasco (ECU)	4
Aiperi Medet Kyzy (KGZ)	6^{F}
Samar Amer (EGY)	5

Semifinals
Wang Juan (CHN)	1
Kiran Bishnoi (IND)	1
Kennedy Blades (USA)	12
Aiperi Medet Kyzy (KGZ)	1

Final
Wang Juan (CHN)	5
Kennedy Blades (USA)	6

Repechage round 1
Gulmaral Yerkebayeva (KAZ)
Elmira Syzdykova (KAZ)	WO
Zhou Qian (CHN)	6^{F}
Génesis Reasco (ECU)	1

Bronze medal match
Elmira Syzdykova (KAZ)	11
Kiran Bishnoi (IND)	0
Zhou Qian (CHN)	0
Aiperi Medet Kyzy (KGZ)	3
