= Jade Parsons =

Canadian freestyle wrestler

Personal information
- Full name: Jade Mariah Parsons
- Born: 6 November 1990 (age 35)

Sport
- Country: Canada
- Sport: Amateur wrestling
- Weight class: 53 kg
- Event: Freestyle
- Club: Brock Wrestling Club
Medal record
Women's freestyle wrestling
Representing Canada
Pan American Games
Bronze medal – third place	2019 Lima	53 kg
Pan American Championships
Silver medal – second place	2020 Ottawa	53 kg

Jade Mariah Parsons (born 6 November 1990) is a Canadian freestyle wrestler.

== Career ==
In 2018, Parsons competed at the Klippan Lady Open in Klippan, Sweden without winning a medal. Later that year, she represented Canada in the women's freestyle event of the 2018 Wrestling World Cup. In the pool stage she lost her matches against Becka Leathers and Mayu Mukaida but she secured a win against Liliana Juarez. Canada went on to compete for fifth place against Belarus. In this match Parsons lost against Iryna Kurachkina though Canada did win enough matches to finish in fifth place. In 2018, she also competed in the women's freestyle 55 kg event at the 2018 World Wrestling Championships held in Budapest, Hungary without winning a medal. Parsons was eliminated in her first match by Zhang Qi.

Parsons represented Canada at the 2019 Pan American Games held in Lima, Peru and she won one of the bronze medals in the 53 kg event. In the same year, she also competed in the women's freestyle 55 kg event at the 2019 World Wrestling Championships held in Nur-Sultan, Kazakhstan without winning a medal. Parsons lost her first match against Nanami Irie of Japan and she was eliminated in her next match against Olga Khoroshavtseva of Russia.

At the 2020 Pan American Wrestling Championships held in Ottawa, Canada, she won the silver medal in the 53 kg event. In the final, she lost against Luisa Valverde of Ecuador.

== Achievements ==
Year	Tournament	Location	Result	Event
2019	Pan American Games	Lima, Peru	3rd	Freestyle 53 kg
2020	Pan American Wrestling Championships	Ottawa, Canada	2nd	Freestyle 53 kg
