= 2019 World Wrestling Championships – Women's freestyle 55 kg =

Women's freestyle 55 kg at the 2019 World Championships
- Venue: Barys Arena
- Dates: 17–18 September 2019
- Competitors: 18 from 18 nations

Medalists
gold medal	Jacarra Winchester	United States
silver medal	Nanami Irie	Japan
bronze medal	Olga Khoroshavtseva	Russia
bronze medal	Bat-Ochiryn Bolortuyaa	Mongolia

The women's freestyle 55 kilograms is a competition featured at the 2019 World Wrestling Championships, and was held in Nur-Sultan, Kazakhstan on 17 and 18 September.

This freestyle wrestling competition consists of a single-elimination tournament, with a repechage used to determine the winner of two bronze medals. The two finalists face off for gold and silver medals. Each wrestler who loses to one of the two finalists moves into the repechage, culminating in a pair of bronze medal matches featuring the semifinal losers each facing the remaining repechage opponent from their half of the bracket.

== Results ==
Legend

- F — Won by fall

=== Final ===
Final
Nanami Irie (JPN)	3
Jacarra Winchester (USA)	5

=== Top half ===
Round of 32

Round of 16
Marina Sedneva (KAZ)	6^{F}
Kiều Thị Ly (VIE)	0
Irene Symeonidis (AUS)	0
Anna Łukasiak (POL)	10
Nanami Irie (JPN)	10
Jade Parsons (CAN)	0
Olga Khoroshavtseva (RUS)	7
Xie Mengyu (CHN)	4

Quarterfinals
Marina Sedneva (KAZ)	5
Anna Łukasiak (POL)	0
Nanami Irie (JPN)	7
Olga Khoroshavtseva (RUS)	4

Semifinals
Marina Sedneva (KAZ)	0
Nanami Irie (JPN)	10

=== Bottom half ===
Round of 32
Iryna Husyak (UKR)	4^{F}
Kim Hae-yeung (KOR)	0
Annika Wendle (GER)	10
Sevara Eshmuratova (UZB)	3

Round of 16
Jacarra Winchester (USA)	10
Madina Nadirova (KGZ)	0
Lalita Sehrawat (IND)	3
Bat-Ochiryn Bolortuyaa (MGL)	10
Andreea Ana (ROU)	1
Iryna Husyak (UKR)	2
Annika Wendle (GER)	0
Bediha Gün (TUR)	11

Quarterfinals
Jacarra Winchester (USA)	13
Bat-Ochiryn Bolortuyaa (MGL)	2
Iryna Husyak (UKR)	4
Bediha Gün (TUR)	14

Semifinals
Jacarra Winchester (USA)	6
Bediha Gün (TUR)	4

=== Repechage ===
Repechage round 2
Jade Parsons (CAN)	2
Olga Khoroshavtseva (RUS)	6
Madina Nadirova (KGZ)	0
Bat-Ochiryn Bolortuyaa (MGL)	8

Bronze medals
Olga Khoroshavtseva (RUS)	13
Marina Sedneva (KAZ)	0
Bat-Ochiryn Bolortuyaa (MGL)	12
Bediha Gün (TUR)	9
