= Husiyuetu =

Chinese Greco-Roman wrestler

Personal information
- Native name: 呼斯乐吐
- Nationality: China
- Born: 1995 (age 30–31) Gansu, China
- Weight: 67 kg (148 lb; 10.6 st)

Sport
- Country: China
- Sport: Amateur wrestling
- Weight class: 67 kg
- Event: Greco-Roman
Medal record
Men's Greco-Roman wrestling
Representing China
Grand Prix
Gold medal – first place	2023 Zagreb	67 kg
Silver medal – second place	2023 Bishkek	67 kg
Bronze medal – third place	2023 Alexandria	67 kg
Poland Open
Bronze medal – third place	2022 Warsaw	67 kg
National Games of China
Silver medal – second place	2021 Shaanxi	67 kg

Husiyuetu (born 1995) is a Chinese Greco-Roman wrestler of Mongol ethnicity.

== Background ==
Husiyuetu is from Gansu province and is of Mongol Ethnicity. He joined the Gansu provincial team in 2012.

== Career ==
In February 2023, Husiyuetu won a gold medal in the 67kh event at the 2023 Grand Prix Zagreb Open after defeating Olympic gold medalist Luis Orta in the semifinals and Reza Abbasi in the finals.

In the 2023 United World Wrestling ranking series, Husiyuetu won 3 medals consisting of 1 gold, 1 silver and 1 bronze.

He competed at the 2024 Asian Wrestling Olympic Qualification Tournament in Bishkek, Kyrgyzstan hoping to qualify for the 2024 Summer Olympics in Paris, France. He was eliminated in his third match and he did not qualify for the Olympics.
