= Marina Sedneva =

Kazakhstani freestyle wrestler

Personal information
- Born: 3 March 1996 (age 30)

Sport
- Country: Kazakhstan
- Sport: Amateur wrestling
- Weight class: 55 kg
- Event: Freestyle
Medal record
Women's freestyle wrestling
Representing Kazakhstan
Asian Championships
Bronze medal – third place	2019 Xi'an	55 kg
Bronze medal – third place	2023 Astana	55 kg
World Military Championships
Bronze medal – third place	2024 Yerevan	55 kg
World U23 Championship
Bronze medal – third place	2018 Bucharest	55 kg
Bronze medal – third place	2019 Budapest	55 kg
Asian U23 Championship
Gold medal – first place	2019 Ulaanbaatar	55 kg

Marina Sedneva (born 3 March 1996) is a Kazakhstani freestyle wrestler. She won one of the bronze medals in the 55 kg event at the 2019 Asian Wrestling Championships held in Xi'an, China. She also won one of the bronze medals in her event at the 2023 Asian Wrestling Championships held in Astana, Kazakhstan.

== Career ==
Sedneva competed in the women's 58 kg event at the 2017 Asian Indoor and Martial Arts Games held in Ashgabat, Turkmenistan. Here she was eliminated from the competition in her second match by Pooja Dhanda of India.

In 2019, Sedneva won the gold medal in the 55 kg event at the Asian U23 Wrestling Championship held in Ulaanbaatar, Mongolia. She won one of the bronze medals in the 55 kg event at the 2019 Asian Wrestling Championships held in Xi'an, China. She lost her bronze medal match in the 55 kg event at the 2019 World Wrestling Championships held in Nur-Sultan, Kazakhstan.

Sedneva competed in the 55 kg event at the 2022 World Wrestling Championships held in Belgrade, Serbia. She lost her first match and she was then eliminated in her second match in the repechage by eventual bronze medalist Xie Mengyu of China.

Sedneva won one of the bronze medals in her event at the 2023 Ibrahim Moustafa Tournament held in Alexandria, Egypt. She also won one of the bronze medals in her event at the 2023 Asian Wrestling Championships held in Astana, Kazakhstan.

== Achievements ==
Year	Tournament	Location	Result	Event
2019	Asian Championships	Xi'an, China	3rd	Freestyle 55 kg
2023	Asian Championships	Astana, Kazakhstan	3rd	Freestyle 55 kg
