= Wrestling at the 2019 Pan American Games – Women's freestyle 53 kg =

Women's Freestyle 53 kg at the 2019 Pan American Games
- Venue: Miguel Grau Coliseum
- Dates: August 8
- Competitors: 8 from 8 nations

Medalists
Gold medal	Sarah Hildebrandt	United States
Silver medal	Betzabeth Argüello	Venezuela
Bronze medal	Jade Parsons	Canada
Bronze medal	Lianna Montero	Cuba

The women's freestyle 53 kg competition of the Wrestling events at the 2019 Pan American Games in Lima was held on August 8 at the Miguel Grau Coliseum.

== Results ==
All times are local (UTC−5)

Legend

- F — Won by fall

=== Final ===
Quarterfinals		Semifinals		Finals
Luisa Valverde (ECU)	0
Sarah Hildebrandt (USA)	8	Sarah Hildebrandt (USA)	10
Jade Parsons (CAN)	5^{F}	Jade Parsons (CAN)	0
Dannia Figueroa (COL)	0			Sarah Hildebrandt (USA)	10
Lianna Montero (CUB)	8			Betzabeth Argüello (VEN)	0
Camila Fama (BRA)	0	Lianna Montero (CUB)	1
Betzabeth Argüello (VEN)	4^{F}	Betzabeth Argüello (VEN)	4^{F}
Justina Benites (PER)	0

=== Repechage ===
Bronze medal match
Luisa Valverde (ECU)	3
Jade Parsons (CAN)	6
Justina Benites (PER)	0
Lianna Montero (CUB)	11
