= 2022 World Wrestling Championships – Women's freestyle 55 kg =

Wrestling competitions

Women's freestyle 55 kg at the 2022 World Championships
- Venue: Štark Arena
- Dates: 12–13 September 2022
- Competitors: 17 from 17 nations

Medalists
gold medal	Mayu Shidochi	Japan
silver medal	Oleksandra Khomenets	Ukraine
bronze medal	Xie Mengyu	China
bronze medal	Karla Godinez	Canada

The women's freestyle 55 kilograms is a competition featured at the 2022 World Wrestling Championships, and was held in Belgrade, Serbia on 12 and 13 September 2022.

This freestyle wrestling competition consists of a single-elimination tournament, with a repechage used to determine the winner of two bronze medals. The two finalists face off for gold and silver medals. Each wrestler who loses to one of the two finalists moves into the repechage, culminating in a pair of bronze medal matches featuring the semifinal losers each facing the remaining repechage opponent from their half of the bracket.

== Results ==
Legend

- F — Won by fall

=== Final ===
Final
Mayu Shidochi (JPN)	10
Oleksandra Khomenets (UKR)	0

=== Top half ===
Round of 32
Elvira Kamaloğlu (TUR)	0
Mayu Shidochi (JPN)	10

Round of 16
Nina Hemmer (GER)	4
Xie Mengyu (CHN)	6
Mayu Shidochi (JPN)	10
Marina Sedneva (KAZ)	0
Roksana Zasina (POL)	3
Luisa Valverde (ECU)	2
Ganbaataryn Otgonjargal (MGL)	3
Jacarra Winchester (USA)	8

Quarterfinals
Xie Mengyu (CHN)	0
Mayu Shidochi (JPN)	6
Roksana Zasina (POL)	2
Jacarra Winchester (USA)	4

Semifinals
Mayu Shidochi (JPN)	12
Jacarra Winchester (USA)	0

=== Bottom half ===
Round of 32

Round of 16
Andreea Ana (ROU)	10
Nguyễn Thị Oanh (VIE)	0
Shokhida Akhmedova (UZB)	2
Karla Godinez (CAN)	5
Sushma Shokeen (IND)	2
Yaynelis Sanz (CUB)	1
Mariana Drăguțan (MDA)	8
Oleksandra Khomenets (UKR)	13

Quarterfinals
Andreea Ana (ROU)	1
Karla Godinez (CAN)	2
Sushma Shokeen (IND)	5
Oleksandra Khomenets (UKR)	10

Semifinals
Karla Godinez (CAN)	3
Oleksandra Khomenets (UKR)	5

=== Repechage ===
Repechage round 1
Elvira Kamaloğlu (TUR)	0
Marina Sedneva (KAZ)	5

Repechage round 2
Marina Sedneva (KAZ)	0
Xie Mengyu (CHN)	10
Mariana Drăguțan (MDA)	6^{F}
Sushma Shokeen (IND)	8

Bronze medals
Xie Mengyu (CHN)	6^{F}
Jacarra Winchester (USA)	12
Mariana Drăguțan (MDA)	2
Karla Godinez (CAN)	6

== Final standing ==
Rank	Athlete
1st place, gold medalist(s)	Mayu Shidochi (JPN)
2nd place, silver medalist(s)	Oleksandra Khomenets (UKR)
3rd place, bronze medalist(s)	Xie Mengyu (CHN)
3rd place, bronze medalist(s)	Karla Godinez (CAN)
5	Jacarra Winchester (USA)
5	Mariana Drăguțan (MDA)
7	Andreea Ana (ROU)
8	Sushma Shokeen (IND)
9	Roksana Zasina (POL)
10	Marina Sedneva (KAZ)
11	Nina Hemmer (GER)
12	Ganbaataryn Otgonjargal (MGL)
13	Luisa Valverde (ECU)
14	Shokhida Akhmedova (UZB)
15	Yaynelis Sanz (CUB)
16	Nguyễn Thị Oanh (VIE)
17	Elvira Kamaloğlu (TUR)
