= Karla Godinez =

Canadian freestyle wrestler

Personal information
- Full name: Karla Lorena Godinez Gonzalez
- National team: Canada
- Born: 29 June 1998 (age 28) Aguascalientes, Mexico
- Education: Simon Fraser University

Sport
- Country: Canada
- Sport: Amateur wrestling
- Weight class: 55 kg
- Event: Freestyle
- University team: Simon Fraser Red Leafs
Medal record
Women's freestyle wrestling
Representing Canada
World Championships
Bronze medal – third place	2022 Belgrade	55 kg
Pan American Championships
Gold medal – first place	2022 Acapulco	55 kg
Gold medal – first place	2025 Monterrey	55 kg
Grand Prix
Silver medal – second place	2025 Budapest	55 kg
Silver medal – second place	2026 Zagreb	55 kg

Karla Lorena Godinez Gonzalez (born 29 June 1998) is a Canadian freestyle wrestler. She won one of the bronze medals in the 55 kg event at the 2022 World Wrestling Championships held in Belgrade, Serbia. She won the gold medal in her event at the 2022 Pan American Wrestling Championships held in Acapulco, Mexico. In July 2022, she won silver at the Grand Prix of Spain.

Godinez won the silver medal in the women's 53 kg event at the Grand Prix de France Henri Deglane 2023 held in Nice, France. She competed at the 2024 Pan American Wrestling Olympic Qualification Tournament held in Acapulco, Mexico hoping to qualify for the 2024 Summer Olympics in Paris, France. She was eliminated in her first match.

Godinez is from Coquitalm, British Columbia. Her sister, Ana Godinez, is also a competitive wrestler. Her sister, Loopy Godínez, is a professional mixed martial artist.

== Achievements ==
Year	Tournament	Location	Result	Event
2022	Pan American Wrestling Championships	Acapulco, Mexico	1st	Freestyle 55 kg
2022	World Championships	Belgrade, Serbia	3rd	Freestyle 55 kg
2025	Pan American Wrestling Championships	Monterrey, Mexico	1st	Freestyle 55 kg
