= Nanami Irie =

Japanese sport wrestler (born 1995)

Personal information
- Nationality: Japan
- Born: 8 January 1995 (age 31)
- Height: 1.53 m (5 ft 0 in)
- Weight: 55 kg (121 lb)

Sport
- Country: Japan
- Sport: Wrestling
- Event: Free style
Medal record
Women's Freestyle Wrestling
Representing Japan
World Championships
| Silver medal – second place | 2019 Nur-Sultan | 55 kg |
Asian Championships
| Bronze medal – third place | 2015 Doha | 53kg |

Nanami Irie (入江 ななみ, Irie Nanami; born 8 January 1995) is a Japanese wrestler who competes in the women's freestyle category. She claimed silver medal in the women's 55 kg event during the 2019 World Wrestling Championships.
