= Luo Xiaojuan (wrestler) =

Chinese freestyle wrestler

Personal information
- Born: 19 March 1993 (age 33)
- Height: 165 cm (5 ft 5 in)

Sport
- Country: China
- Sport: Amateur wrestling
- Weight class: 62 kg
- Event: Freestyle
Medal record
Women's freestyle wrestling
Representing China
World Championships
| Bronze medal – third place | 2022 Belgrade | 62 kg |
Asian Championships
| Gold medal – first place | 2015 Doha | 60 kg |
| Gold medal – first place | 2019 Xi'an | 65 kg |
| Silver medal – second place | 2018 Bishkek | 62 kg |

Luo Xiaojuan (born 19 March 1993) is a Chinese freestyle wrestler. She won one of the bronze medals in the 62 kg event at the 2022 World Wrestling Championships held in Belgrade, Serbia. She is a two-time gold medalist at the Asian Wrestling Championships.

In 2015, she won the gold medal in the women's 60 kg event at the Asian Wrestling Championships held in Doha, Qatar. She repeated this in the women's 65 kg event at the 2019 Asian Wrestling Championships held in Xi'an, China. She also won the silver medal in the women's 62 kg event at the 2018 Asian Wrestling Championships held in Bishkek, Kyrgyzstan.

She won the silver medal in her event at the 2023 Ibrahim Moustafa Tournament held in Alexandria, Egypt.
