= Jacarra Winchester =

American freestyle wrestler

Personal information
- Born: October 19, 1992 (age 34) Oakland, California, U.S.

Sport
- Country: United States
- Sport: Freestyle wrestling Folkstyle wrestling
Medal record
Women's freestyle wrestling
Representing the United States
World Championships
Gold medal – first place	2019 Nur-Sultan	55 kg
Silver medal – second place	2023 Belgrade	55 kg
Pan American Championships
Gold medal – first place	2021 Guatemala City	55 kg
Silver medal – second place	2022 Acapulco	55 kg
Bronze medal – third place	2019 Buenos Aires	57 kg
Yasar Dogu Tournament
Gold medal – first place	2022 Istanbul	55 kg

Jacarra Winchester (born October 19, 1992) is an American freestyle wrestler. She won the gold medal in the women's 55 kg event at the 2019 World Wrestling Championships and the 2021 Pan American Wrestling Championships. She also represented the United States at the 2020 Summer Olympics in Tokyo, Japan.

== College career ==
She competed for Missouri Valley College in college.

== 2018 season ==
Winchester competed at the 2018 World Wrestling Championships, where she finished 5th.

== 2019 season ==
She won gold at the 2019 World Wrestling Championships at 55 kg. She entered the tournament as the third seed. Her victory was part of a record result for the United States, with the women's freestyle team winning three gold medals for the first time.

== 2022 season ==
In 2022, she won the gold medal in the 55 kg event at the Yasar Dogu Tournament held in Istanbul, Turkey. She lost her bronze medal match in the 55 kg event at the 2022 World Wrestling Championships held in Belgrade, Serbia.
