= Roman Kim (wrestler) =

Kyrgyz Greco-Roman wrestler

Personal information
- Born: 20 March 1997 (age 29) Kyrgyzstan
- Height: 1.90 m (6 ft 3 in)
- Weight: 130 kg (290 lb; 20 st)

Sport
- Country: Kyrgyzstan
- Sport: Amateur wrestling
- Event: Greco-Roman
Medal record
Men's Greco-Roman wrestling
Representing Kyrgyzstan
Asian Championships
Bronze medal – third place	2020 New Delhi	130 kg
Bronze medal – third place	2022 Ulaanbaatar	130 kg
Bronze medal – third place	2023 Astana	130 kg
Grand Prix
Bronze medal – third place	2022 Warsaw	130 kg
Asian U23 Championships
Gold medal – first place	2019 Ulaanbaatar	130 kg
World Juniors Championships
Silver medal – second place	2017 Tampere	130 kg
Asian Juniors Championships
Bronze medal – third place	2017 Taichung	120 kg
World Cadets Championships
Bronze medal – third place	2014 Snina	100 kg
Asian Cadets Championships
Gold medal – first place	2014 Bangkok	100 kg

Roman Kim (born 20 March 1997) is a Kyrgyz Greco-Roman wrestler competing in the 130 kg division.

== Career ==
Bronze medallist at the 2020, 2022 and 2023 Asian Championships. Junior world vice-champion in 2017; third at the 2014 Cadet World Championships. Asian U-23 champion in 2019. Asian cadet champion in 2014.

On 9 April 2023 in Astana, defeating Temurbek Nasimov from Uzbekistan in the bout for 3rd place, he won the bronze medal of the Asian Championships.

He competed at the 2024 Asian Wrestling Olympic Qualification Tournament in Bishkek, Kyrgyzstan hoping to qualify for the 2024 Summer Olympics in Paris, France. He was eliminated in his second match and he did not qualify for the Olympics. He also competed at the 2024 World Wrestling Olympic Qualification Tournament held in Istanbul, Turkey without qualifying for the Olympics.
