= Xie Mengyu =

Chinese freestyle wrestler

Sport
- Country: China
- Sport: Amateur wrestling
- Weight class: 55 kg
- Event: Freestyle
Medal record
Women's freestyle wrestling
Representing China
World Championships
Bronze medal – third place	2022 Belgrade	55 kg
Asian Championships
Gold medal – first place	2026 Bishkek	59 kg
Gold medal – first place	2019 Xi'an	55 kg

Xie Mengyu is a Chinese freestyle wrestler. She won one of the bronze medals in the 55 kg event at the 2022 World Wrestling Championships held in Belgrade, Serbia. She won the gold medal in her event at the 2019 Asian Wrestling Championships held in Xi'an, China.

She competed in the 55 kg event at the 2019 World Wrestling Championships held in Nur-Sultan, Kazakhstan. She was eliminated in her first match by eventual bronze medalist Olga Khoroshavtseva of Russia.

She won one of the bronze medals in her event at the 2023 Ibrahim Moustafa Tournament held in Alexandria, Egypt.

== Achievements ==
Year	Tournament	Location	Result	Event
2019	Asian Championships	Xi'an, China	1st	Freestyle 55 kg
2022	World Championships	Belgrade, Serbia	3rd	Freestyle 55 kg
