= 2023 U23 World Wrestling Championships – Women's freestyle 55 kg =

Wrestling competitions

Women's freestyle 55 kg at the 2023 U23 World Championships
- Venue: Tirana Olympic Park
- Dates: 25–26 October
- Competitors: 16 from 13 nations

Medalists
gold medal	Umi Imai	Japan
silver medal	Neha Sharma
bronze medal	Aryna Martynava	Authorised Neutral Athletes
bronze medal	Andreea Ana	Romania

The women's freestyle 55 kilograms is a competition featured at the 2023 U23 World Wrestling Championships, and will held in Tirana, Albania on 25 and 26 October 2023.

This freestyle wrestling competition consists of a single-elimination tournament, with a repechage used to determine the winner of two bronze medals. The two finalists face off for gold and silver medals. Each wrestler who loses to one of the two finalists moves into the repechage, culminating in a pair of bronze medal matches featuring the semifinal losers each facing the remaining repechage opponent from their half of the bracket.

== Results ==
Legend

- F — Won by fall

=== Main bracket ===
Round of 16
Erika Bognár (HUN)	0
Şevval Çayır (TUR)	5^{F}
Zeinep Bayanova (KAZ)	0
Neha Sharma (UWW)	5
Nova Bergman (SWE)	0
Aryna Martynava (ANA)	10
Alisha Howk (USA)	4^{F}
Immacolata Danise (ITA)	6
Mariia Vynnyk (UKR)	8
Venera Nafikova (ANA)	4
Nazife Tair (BUL)	0
Virginie Kaze-Gascon (CAN)	10
Mihaela Samoil (MDA)	1
Andreea Ana (ROU)	11
Aruuke Kadyrbek Kyzy (KGZ)	0
Umi Imai (JPN)	4^{F}

Quarterfinals
Şevval Çayır (TUR)	3
Neha Sharma (UWW)	6
Aryna Martynava (ANA)	10
Alisha Howk (USA)	0
Mariia Vynnyk (UKR)	12
Virginie Kaze-Gascon (CAN)	1
Andreea Ana (ROU)	4
Umi Imai (JPN)	10

Semifinals
Neha Sharma (UWW)	2
Aryna Martynava (ANA)	1
Mariia Vynnyk (UKR)	2
Umi Imai (JPN)	13

Final
Neha Sharma (UWW)	2
Umi Imai (JPN)	4

=== Repechage ===
Repechage round 1
Zeinep Bayanova (KAZ)	11^{F}
Şevval Çayır (TUR)	0
Aruuke Kadyrbek Kyzy (KGZ)	0
Andreea Ana (ROU)	7

Bronze medals
Zeinep Bayanova (KAZ)	5
Aryna Martynava (ANA)	8
Andreea Ana (ROU)	3
Mariia Vynnyk (UKR)	1
