= 2022 European Wrestling Championships – Women's freestyle 55 kg =

Wrestling competition

Women's freestyle 55 kg at the 2022 European Wrestling Championships
- Venue: BOK Sports Hall
- Location: Budapest, Hungary
- Dates: 30-31 March
- Competitors: 9

Medalists
gold medal	Andreea Ana	Romania
silver medal	Oleksandra Khomenets	Ukraine
bronze medal	Bediha Gün	Turkey
bronze medal	Mariana Drăguțan	Moldova

The women's freestyle 55 kg was a competition featured at the 2022 European Wrestling Championships, and was held in Budapest, Hungary on March 30 and 31.

Andreea Ana became the first female wrestler representing Romania to win a gold medal at the European Wrestling Championships.

== Results ==
Legend

- F — Won by fall

=== Main Bracket ===
1/8 finals
Nova Bergman (SWE)	2
Sezen Belberova (BUL)	1

Quarterfinals
Oleksandra Khomenets (UKR)	9^{F}
Nova Bergman (SWE)	2
Bediha Gün (TUR)	3
Erika Bognár (HUN)	0
Laura Stanelytė (LTU)	0
Mariana Drăguțan (MDA)	11
Anastasia Blayvas (GER)	0
Andreea Ana (ROU)	10

Semifinals
Oleksandra Khomenets (UKR)	9^{F}
Bediha Gün (TUR)	4
Mariana Drăguțan (MDA)	0
Andreea Ana (ROU)	6

Final
Oleksandra Khomenets (UKR)	5
Andreea Ana (ROU)	7

=== Repechage ===
Bronze medal match
Nova Bergman (SWE)	4
Bediha Gün (TUR)	5
Anastasia Blayvas (GER)	1
Mariana Drăguțan (MDA)	2^{F}

== Final standing ==
Rank	Wrestler	UWW Points
1st place, gold medalist(s)	Andreea Ana (ROU)	10000
2nd place, silver medalist(s)	Oleksandra Khomenets (UKR)	8000
3rd place, bronze medalist(s)	Bediha Gün (TUR)	6500
3rd place, bronze medalist(s)	Mariana Drăguțan (MDA)	6500
5	Nova Bergman (SWE)	5000
5	Anastasia Blayvas (GER)	5000
7	Sezen Belberova (BUL)	4400
8	Erika Bognár (HUN)	4000
9	Laura Stanelytė (LTU)	3500
