= 2026 European Wrestling Championships – Women's freestyle 55 kg =

Wrestling competition

Women's freestyle 55 kg at the 2026 European Wrestling Championships
- Venue: Tirana Olympic Park
- Location: Tirana, Albania
- Dates: 22–23 April
- Competitors: 8 from 7 nations

Medalists
gold medal	Andreea Ana	Romania
silver medal	Liliia Malanchuk	Ukraine
bronze medal	Tuba Demir	Turkey
bronze medal	Anastasia Blayvas	Germany

The women's freestyle 55 kg competition at the 2026 European Wrestling Championships was held in Tirana, Albania, on 22 and 23 April 2026.

== Results ==
Legend

- F — Won by fall

=== Main bracket ===
Quarterfinals		Semifinals		Final
Ekaterina Verbina (UWW)	6
Tuba Demir (TUR)	13	Tuba Demir (TUR)	1
Veronika Ryabovolova (MKD)	0	Liliia Malanchuk (UKR)	7^{F}
Liliia Malanchuk (UKR)	8			Liliia Malanchuk (UKR)	0
Mihaela Samoil (MDA)	8^{F}			Andreea Ana (ROU)	10
Oleksandra Kohut (AUT)	0	Mihaela Samoil (MDA)	0
Anastasia Blayvas (GER)	2	Andreea Ana (ROU)	10
Andreea Ana (ROU)	8

=== Repechage ===
Bronze medal matches
Veronika Ryabovolova (MKD)	2
Tuba Demir (TUR)	5
Anastasia Blayvas (GER)	4
Mihaela Samoil (MDA)	3

== Final standing ==
Rank	Athlete
1st place, gold medalist(s)	Andreea Ana (ROU)
2nd place, silver medalist(s)	Liliia Malanchuk (UKR)
3rd place, bronze medalist(s)	Tuba Demir (TUR)
3rd place, bronze medalist(s)	Anastasia Blayvas (GER)
5	Veronika Ryabovolova (MKD)
5	Mihaela Samoil (MDA)
7	Ekaterina Verbina (UWW)
8	Oleksandra Kohut (AUT)
