= 2021 European Wrestling Championships – Women's freestyle 55 kg =

Wrestling competition

The women's freestyle 55 kg is a competition featured at the 2021 European Wrestling Championships, and was held in Warsaw, Poland on April 21 and April 22.

== Medalists ==
Gold	Stalvira Orshush; Russia
Silver	Roksana Zasina; Poland
Bronze	Andreea Ana; Romania
Bronze	Khrystyna-Zoryana Demko; Ukraine

== Results ==
Legend

- F — Won by fall

1/8 finals
Stalvira Orshush (RUS)	3
Khrystyna-Zoryana Demko (UKR)	2
Mercédesz Dénes (HUN)	0
Jessica Blaszka (NED)	5
Mariana Drăguțan (MDA)	2
Eda Tekin (TUR)	5

Quarterfinals
Andreea Ana (ROU)	5
Hilary Honorine (FRA)	3
Roksana Zasina (POL)	5
Katsiaryna Pichkouskaya (BLR)	0
Sezen Belberova (BUL)	0
Stalvira Orshush (RUS)	11
Jessica Blaszka (NED)	10
Eda Tekin (TUR)	0

Semifinals
Andreea Ana (ROU)	1
Roksana Zasina (POL)	2
Stalvira Orshush (RUS)	9
Jessica Blaszka (NED)	2

Final
Roksana Zasina (POL)	2
Stalvira Orshush (RUS)	2

Repechage round 1
Khrystyna-Zoryana Demko (UKR)	2
Sezen Belberova (BUL)	1

Bronze medal match
Katsiaryna Pichkouskaya (BLR)	0
Andreea Ana (ROU)	12
Khrystyna-Zoryana Demko (UKR)	9
Jessica Blaszka (NED)	4

== Final standing ==
Rank	Athlete
1st place, gold medalist(s)	Stalvira Orshush (RUS)
2nd place, silver medalist(s)	Roksana Zasina (POL)
3rd place, bronze medalist(s)	Andreea Ana (ROU)
3rd place, bronze medalist(s)	Khrystyna-Zoryana Demko (UKR)
5	Katsiaryna Pichkouskaya (BLR)
5	Jessica Blaszka (NED)
7	Eda Tekin (TUR)
8	Hilary Honorine (FRA)
9	Mariana Drăguțan (MDA)
10	Sezen Belberova (BUL)
11	Mercédesz Dénes (HUN)
