= 2023 European Wrestling Championships – Women's freestyle 55 kg =

Wrestling competition

Women's freestyle 55 kg at the 2023 European Wrestling Championships
- Venue: Arena Zagreb
- Location: Zagreb, Croatia
- Dates: 19-20 April
- Competitors: 11

Medalists
gold medal	Andreea Ana	Romania
silver medal	Erika Bognár	Hungary
bronze medal	Tatiana Debien	France
bronze medal	Katarzyna Krawczyk	Poland

The women's freestyle 55 kg is a competition featured at the 2023 European Wrestling Championships, and will held in Zagreb, Croatia on April 19 and 20.

== Results ==
Legend

- F — Won by fall

Round of 16
Marija Ignjatović (SRB)	0
Annika Wendle (GER)	2^{F}
Katarzyna Krawczyk (POL)	4
Mariia Vynnyk (UKR)	2
Laura Stanelytė (LTU)	3
Elnura Mammadova (AZE)	13

Quarterfinals
Mariana Drăguțan (MDA)	2
Annika Wendle (GER)	6^{F}
Erika Bognár (HUN)	3
Tatiana Debien (FRA)	1
Bediha Gün (TUR)	3
Katarzyna Krawczyk (POL)	6
Elnura Mammadova (AZE)	0
Andreea Ana (ROU)	11

Semifinals
Annika Wendle (GER)	2
Erika Bognár (HUN)	6
Katarzyna Krawczyk (POL)	4
Andreea Ana (ROU)	10

Final
Erika Bognár (HUN)	0
Andreea Ana (ROU)	8

Bronze medal match
Tatiana Debien (FRA)	6
Annika Wendle (GER)	4
Elnura Mammadova (AZE)	0
Katarzyna Krawczyk (POL)	9

== Final standing ==
Rank	Athlete
1st place, gold medalist(s)	Andreea Ana (ROU)
2nd place, silver medalist(s)	Erika Bognár (HUN)
3rd place, bronze medalist(s)	Tatiana Debien (FRA)
3rd place, bronze medalist(s)	Katarzyna Krawczyk (POL)
5	Annika Wendle (GER)
5	Elnura Mammadova (AZE)
7	Bediha Gün (TUR)
8	Laura Stanelytė (LTU)
9	Mariia Vynnyk (UKR)
10	Mariana Drăguțan (MDA)
11	Marija Ignjatović (SRB)
