= 2021 U23 World Wrestling Championships – Men's freestyle 86 kg =

Wrestling Championship

The men's freestyle 86 kilograms is a competition featured at the 2021 U23 World Wrestling Championships, and was held in Belgrade, Serbia on 6 and 7 November.

== Medalists ==
Gold	Mukhammed Aliiev (UKR)
Silver	Sajjad Gholami (IRI)
Bronze	Lars Schäfle (GER)
Bronze	Ivars Samušonoks (LAT)

== Results ==
Legend

- F — Won by fall
- WO — Won by walkover

=== Final ===
Final
Mukhammed Aliiev (UKR)	11
Sajjad Gholami (IRI)	4

=== Top half ===
Round of 32

Round of 16
Bobur Islomov (UZB)	7
Mukhammed Aliiev (UKR)	16
Lars Schäfle (GER)	8^{F}
Rakhim Magamadov (FRA)	4
Kornelijus Stulginskas (LTU)	4
Sandeep Singh Maan (IND)	14
Maksat Satybaldy (KAZ)	2
Zagid Karimov (RUS)	13

Quarterfinals
Mukhammed Aliiev (UKR)	4
Lars Schäfle (GER)	4
Sandeep Singh Maan (IND)	3
Zagid Karimov (RUS)	7

Semifinals
Mukhammed Aliiev (UKR)	6
Zagid Karimov (RUS)	5

=== Bottom half ===
Round of 32
Myles Wilson (USA)	7
Cezary Sadowski (POL)	0
Nurtilek Karypbaev (KGZ)	5
Mher Markosyan (ARM)	8
Emre Çiftçi (TUR)	10
Benjamin Greil (AUT)	0
Sajjad Gholami (IRI)	WO
~~Abubakr Abakarov (AZE)~~
Demur Megeneishvili (GEO)	2
Hunter Lee (CAN)	13
Dzhemal Rushen Ali (BUL)	2
Ivan Ichizli (MDA)	13^{F}
~~Fateh Benferdjallah (ALG)~~
Uri Kalashnikov (ISR)	WO
Ivars Samušonoks (LAT)	11
Layth Abushraim (PLE)	0

Round of 16
Myles Wilson (USA)	4
Mher Markosyan (ARM)	7
Emre Çiftçi (TUR)	2
Sajjad Gholami (IRI)	8
Hunter Lee (CAN)	10
Ivan Ichizli (MDA)	6
Uri Kalashnikov (ISR)	2
Ivars Samušonoks (LAT)	5

Quarterfinals
Mher Markosyan (ARM)	0
Sajjad Gholami (IRI)	5
Hunter Lee (CAN)	2
Ivars Samušonoks (LAT)	9

Semifinals
Sajjad Gholami (IRI)	9
Ivars Samušonoks (LAT)	0

=== Repechage ===
Repechage round 1
~~Abubakr Abakarov (AZE)~~
Emre Çiftçi (TUR)	WO

Repechage round 2
Bobur Islomov (UZB)	2
Lars Schäfle (GER)	3
Emre Çiftçi (TUR)	4
Mher Markosyan (ARM)	0

Bronze medals
Lars Schäfle (GER)	3
Zagid Karimov (RUS)	0
Emre Çiftçi (TUR)	2
Ivars Samušonoks (LAT)	5
