= 2019 European Wrestling Championships – Women's freestyle 55 kg =

The women's freestyle 55 kg is a competition featured at the 2019 European Wrestling Championships, and was held in Bucharest, Romania on April 10 and April 11.

== Medalists ==
Gold	Iryna Husyak; Ukraine
Silver	Evelina Nikolova; Bulgaria
Bronze	Bediha Gün; Turkey
Bronze	Andreea Ana; Romania

== Results ==
Legend

- F — Won by fall

=== Main Bracket ===
1/8 finals
Christina Demirkan (GRE)	0
Mariana Drăguțan (MDA)	10
Evelina Nikolova (BUL)	18^{F}
Alicja Czyżowicz (POL)	10

Quarterfinals
Iryna Husyak (UKR)	9
Bediha Gün (TUR)	6
Zalina Sidakova (BLR)	10
Viktoria Vaulina (RUS)	0
Andreea Ana (ROU)	5
Arianna Carieri (ITA)	1
Mariana Drăguțan (MDA)	2
Evelina Nikolova (BUL)	9^{F}

Semifinals
Iryna Husyak (UKR)	8
Zalina Sidakova (BLR)	4
Andreea Ana (ROU)	0
Evelina Nikolova (BUL)	3

Final
Iryna Husyak (UKR)	10
Evelina Nikolova (BUL)	4

=== Repechage ===
Repechage round 1
Alicja Czyżowicz (POL)	0
Mariana Drăguțan (MDA)	8

Bronze medal match
Bediha Gün (TUR)	10
Zalina Sidakova (BLR)	0
Mariana Drăguțan (MDA)	4
Andreea Ana (ROU)	6
