= 2021 U23 World Wrestling Championships – Men's freestyle 65 kg =

Wrestling Championship

The men's freestyle 65 kilograms is a competition featured at the 2021 U23 World Wrestling Championships, and was held in Belgrade, Serbia on 5 and 6 November.

== Medalists ==
Gold	Georgios Pilidis; Greece
Silver	Ibragim Abdurakhmanov; Russia
Bronze	Cavit Acar; Turkey
Bronze	Ziraddin Bayramov; Azerbaijan

== Results ==
Legend

- F — Won by fall
- WO — Won by walkover
- R — Retired

=== Final ===
Final
Ibragim Abdurakhmanov (RUS)	3
Georgios Pilidis (GRE)	4

=== Top half ===
Round of 32
Colin Realbuto (ITA)	0
Ibragim Abdurakhmanov (RUS)	11
Abbos Rakhmonov (UZB)	7
Ross Connelly (GBR)	0
~~Abdelwahad Badri (MAR)~~
Dom Demas (USA)	WO
~~Sulaiman Kargbo (SLE)~~
Ziraddin Bayramov (AZE)	WO

Round of 16
Iveriko Julakidze (GEO)	13
Jacob Torres (CAN)	1
Stilyan Iliev (BUL)	13^{F}
Ahmed Barahmah (KSA)	2
Ibragim Abdurakhmanov (RUS)	7
Abbos Rakhmonov (UZB)	7
Dom Demas (USA)	3
Ziraddin Bayramov (AZE)	6

Quarterfinals
Iveriko Julakidze (GEO)	2^{R}
Stilyan Iliev (BUL)	0
Ibragim Abdurakhmanov (RUS)	3
Ziraddin Bayramov (AZE)	1

Semifinals
Stilyan Iliev (BUL)	0
Ibragim Abdurakhmanov (RUS)	10

=== Bottom half ===
Round of 32
Ilyas Amanzholov (KAZ)	2
Georgios Pilidis (GRE)	4
Leon Gerstenberger (GER)	2
Parvinder Nain (IND)	8
Hrachya Margaryan (ARM)	4
Marwane Yezza (FRA)	2
~~Gilbert Kaboche (KEN)~~
Uladzislau Koika (BLR)	WO
Cavit Acar (TUR)	10
Pavel Graur (MDA)	0
Hassan Ebadi (IRI)	11
Károly Kiss (HUN)	0
Ayub Musaev (BEL)	6
Ștefan Coman (ROU)	8
Erik Arushanian (UKR)	3
Aibek Toktogul Uulu (KGZ)	4

Round of 16
Georgios Pilidis (GRE)	4
Parvinder Nain (IND)	1
Hrachya Margaryan (ARM)	3
Uladzislau Koika (BLR)	0
Cavit Acar (TUR)	5
Hassan Ebadi (IRI)	4
Ștefan Coman (ROU)	1
Aibek Toktogul Uulu (KGZ)	2

Quarterfinals
Georgios Pilidis (GRE)	2
Hrachya Margaryan (ARM)	2
Cavit Acar (TUR)	10
Aibek Toktogul Uulu (KGZ)	0

Semifinals
Georgios Pilidis (GRE)	9
Cavit Acar (TUR)	3

=== Repechage ===
Repechage round 1
Colin Realbuto (ITA)	2
Abbos Rakhmonov (UZB)	12
Ilyas Amanzholov (KAZ)	2
Parvinder Nain (IND)	9

Repechage round 2
Abbos Rakhmonov (UZB)	7
Ziraddin Bayramov (AZE)	10
Parvinder Nain (IND)	5
Hrachya Margaryan (ARM)	6

Bronze medals
Ziraddin Bayramov (AZE)	10
Stilyan Iliev (BUL)	0
Hrachya Margaryan (ARM)	2
Cavit Acar (TUR)	4
