= 2019 European Juniors Wrestling Championships =

- Host city: Pontevedra, Spain
- Dates: June 3–9, 2019

Champions
- Freestyle: Russia
- Greco-Roman: Russia
- Women: Russia

The 2019 European Juniors Wrestling Championships was held in Pontevedra, Spain between June 3–9, 2019.

== Medal table ==
Rank	Nation	Gold	Silver	Bronze	Total
1	Russia	9	6	9	24
2	Hungary	4	3	4	11
3	Georgia	4	1	4	9
4	Turkey	3	4	2	9
5	Belarus	2	2	5	9
6	Armenia	2	2	4	8
7	Azerbaijan	2	2	2	6
8	Ukraine	1	4	8	13
9	Moldova	1	3	4	8
10	Poland	1	0	3	4
11	Sweden	1	0	1	2
12	Romania	0	2	2	4
13	Germany	0	1	1	2
14	Bulgaria	0	0	2	2
14	Croatia	0	0	2	2
14	Italy	0	0	2	2
17	Austria	0	0	1	1
17	Estonia	0	0	1	1
17	Latvia	0	0	1	1
17	Norway	0	0	1	1
17	Spain	0	0	1	1
Totals (21 entries)		30	30	60	120

== Team ranking ==
Rank	Men's freestyle		Men's Greco-Roman		Women's freestyle	
Rank	Team	Points	Team	Points	Team	Points
1	Russia	205	Russia	159	Russia	154
2	Moldova	116	Georgia	151	Ukraine	144
3	Azerbaijan	115	Hungary	124	Belarus	126
4	Turkey	110	Turkey	95	Hungary	105
5	Ukraine	107	Armenia	93	Poland	94

== Medal summary ==
=== Men's freestyle ===
Event	Gold	Silver	Bronze
57 kg	(Russia) Nachyn Mongush	(Turkey) Ahmet Duman	(Ukraine) Kamil Kerimov
57 kg	(Russia) Nachyn Mongush	(Turkey) Ahmet Duman	(Moldova) Nicu Cataveica
61 kg	(Armenia) Hrachya Margaryan	(Ukraine) Oleksandr Yevsieienko	(Hungary) Gamzatgadzhi Khalidov
61 kg	(Armenia) Hrachya Margaryan	(Ukraine) Oleksandr Yevsieienko	(Russia) Aleksandr Sabanov
65 kg	(Azerbaijan) Turan Bayramov	(Russia) Muslim Saidulaev	(Belarus) Dzianis Salavei
65 kg	(Azerbaijan) Turan Bayramov	(Russia) Muslim Saidulaev	(Moldova) Nicolai Grahmez
70 kg	(Moldova) Vasile Diacon	(Russia) Magomed Abdulkadirov	(Turkey) Ömer Faruk Çayır
70 kg	(Moldova) Vasile Diacon	(Russia) Magomed Abdulkadirov	(Armenia) Arman Andreasyan
74 kg	(Russia) Dmitrii Kurpin	(Turkey) Abdulvasi Balta	(Georgia (country)) Goga Mamiauri
74 kg	(Russia) Dmitrii Kurpin	(Turkey) Abdulvasi Balta	(Moldova) Valentin Borzin
79 kg	(Azerbaijan) Abubakr Abakarov	(Russia) Amkhad Tashukhadziev	(Estonia) Erik Reinbok
79 kg	(Azerbaijan) Abubakr Abakarov	(Russia) Amkhad Tashukhadziev	(Armenia) Arman Avagyan
86 kg	(Georgia (country)) Miriani Maisuradze	(Armenia) Mher Markosyan	(Russia) Slavik Naniev
86 kg	(Georgia (country)) Miriani Maisuradze	(Armenia) Mher Markosyan	(Ukraine) Demid Karachenko
92 kg	(Russia) Aslanbek Sotiev	(Azerbaijan) Askhab Hamzatov	(Germany) Ertugrul Ağca
92 kg	(Russia) Aslanbek Sotiev	(Azerbaijan) Askhab Hamzatov	(Bulgaria) Bozhidar Todorov
97 kg	(Turkey) Feyzullah Aktürk	(Moldova) Radu Lefter	(Ukraine) Danylo Stasiuk
97 kg	(Turkey) Feyzullah Aktürk	(Moldova) Radu Lefter	(Russia) Tamik Dzhikaev
125 kg	(Russia) Saipudin Magomedov	(Ukraine) Yurii Idzinskyi	(Georgia (country)) Vasil Khvistani
125 kg	(Russia) Saipudin Magomedov	(Ukraine) Yurii Idzinskyi	(Azerbaijan) Islam Abuev

=== Men's Greco-Roman ===
Event	Gold	Silver	Bronze
55 kg	(Georgia (country)) Pridon Abuladze	(Russia) Anvar Allakhiarov	(Moldova) Artiom Deleanu
55 kg	(Georgia (country)) Pridon Abuladze	(Russia) Anvar Allakhiarov	(Azerbaijan) Zaur Aliyev
60 kg	(Georgia (country)) Diego Chkhikvadze	(Azerbaijan) Asgar Alizada	(Russia) Anar Mansurov
60 kg	(Georgia (country)) Diego Chkhikvadze	(Azerbaijan) Asgar Alizada	(Armenia) Sahak Hovhannisyan
63 kg	(Turkey) Abdullah Toprak	(Georgia (country)) Leri Abuladze	(Armenia) Hrachya Poghosyan
63 kg	(Turkey) Abdullah Toprak	(Georgia (country)) Leri Abuladze	(Russia) Adam Gauzhaev
67 kg	(Georgia (country)) Giorgi Shotadze	(Armenia) Hayk Melikyan	(Belarus) Eldar Hasanau
67 kg	(Georgia (country)) Giorgi Shotadze	(Armenia) Hayk Melikyan	(Austria) Aker Al Obaidi
72 kg	(Armenia) Malkhas Amoyan	(Moldova) Mihai Petic	(Russia) Sergei Stepanov
72 kg	(Armenia) Malkhas Amoyan	(Moldova) Mihai Petic	(Croatia) Pavel Puklavec
77 kg	(Hungary) Tamás Lévai	(Russia) Khamid Isaev	(Belarus) Mikita Kazakou
77 kg	(Hungary) Tamás Lévai	(Russia) Khamid Isaev	(Georgia (country)) Nika Sherbakovi
82 kg	(Hungary) István Takács	(Ukraine) Vitalii Andriiovych	(Croatia) Karlo Kodrić
82 kg	(Hungary) István Takács	(Ukraine) Vitalii Andriiovych	(Russia) Stanislav Pseunov
87 kg	(Russia) Ilia Ermolenko	(Hungary) David Losonczi	(Belarus) Ihar Yarashevich
87 kg	(Russia) Ilia Ermolenko	(Hungary) David Losonczi	(Georgia (country)) Giorgi Katsanashvili
97 kg	(Hungary) Alex Szőke	(Germany) Patrick Neumaier	(Turkey) Beytullah Kayışdağ
97 kg	(Hungary) Alex Szőke	(Germany) Patrick Neumaier	(Belarus) Uladzislau Pustashylau
130 kg	(Turkey) Hamza Bakır	(Russia) Osman Shadov	(Hungary) Dáriusz Vitek
130 kg	(Turkey) Hamza Bakır	(Russia) Osman Shadov	(Norway) Nikola Milatovic

=== Women's freestyle ===
Event	Gold	Silver	Bronze
50 kg	(Russia) Daria Khvostova	(Romania) Stefania Priceputu	(Italy) Emanuela Liuzzi
50 kg	(Russia) Daria Khvostova	(Romania) Stefania Priceputu	(Ukraine) Mariia Vynnyk
53 kg	(Russia) Mariia Tiumerekova	(Turkey) Fikriye Gök	(Sweden) Emma Malmgren
53 kg	(Russia) Mariia Tiumerekova	(Turkey) Fikriye Gök	(Romania) Andreea Ana
55 kg	(Russia) Ekaterina Verbina	(Hungary) Anna Hella Szel	(Bulgaria) Sezen Belberova
55 kg	(Russia) Ekaterina Verbina	(Hungary) Anna Hella Szel	(Poland) Patrycja Gil
57 kg	(Ukraine) Alina Hrushyna	(Belarus) Maryia Hulida	(Hungary) Tamara Dollák
57 kg	(Ukraine) Alina Hrushyna	(Belarus) Maryia Hulida	(Spain) Maria Dilone
59 kg	(Belarus) Kristina Sazykina	(Hungary) Erika Bognár	(Ukraine) Veronika Ryabovolova
59 kg	(Belarus) Kristina Sazykina	(Hungary) Erika Bognár	(Italy) Teresa Lumia
62 kg	(Russia) Maria Lachugina	(Moldova) Irina Rîngaci	(Ukraine) Kateryna Zelenykh
62 kg	(Russia) Maria Lachugina	(Moldova) Irina Rîngaci	(Latvia) Ramina Mamedova
65 kg	(Poland) Wiktoria Choluj	(Ukraine) Anastasia Lavrenchuk	(Romania) Amina Roxana Capezan
65 kg	(Poland) Wiktoria Choluj	(Ukraine) Anastasia Lavrenchuk	(Hungary) Noémi Szabados
68 kg	(Sweden) Tindra Sjöberg	(Turkey) Kadriye Aksoy	(Poland) Ewelina Weronika Ciunek
68 kg	(Sweden) Tindra Sjöberg	(Turkey) Kadriye Aksoy	(Ukraine) Khrystyna Maliavka
72 kg	(Belarus) Anastasiya Zimiankova	(Romania) Maria Larisa Nitu	(Russia) Evgeniya Zakharchenko
72 kg	(Belarus) Anastasiya Zimiankova	(Romania) Maria Larisa Nitu	(Poland) Kamila Czeslawa Kulwicka
76 kg	(Hungary) Bernadett Nagy	(Belarus) Kseniya Dzibuk	(Ukraine) Romana Vovchak
76 kg	(Hungary) Bernadett Nagy	(Belarus) Kseniya Dzibuk	(Russia) Marina Surovtseva

Preceded by 2018 Rome	European Juniors Wrestling Championships; 2019	Succeeded by 2021 Dortmund
