= 2023 World Wrestling Championships – Women's freestyle 55 kg =

Wrestling competitions

Women's freestyle 55 kg at the 2023 World Championships
- Venue: Štark Arena
- Dates: 18–19 September 2023
- Competitors: 19 from 16 nations

Medalists
gold medal	Haruna Okuno	Japan
silver medal	Jacarra Winchester	United States
bronze medal	Mariana Drăguțan	Moldova
bronze medal	Anastasia Blayvas	Germany

The women's freestyle 55 kilograms is a competition featured at the 2023 World Wrestling Championships, and was held in Belgrade, Serbia on 18 and 19 September 2023.

This freestyle wrestling competition consists of a single-elimination tournament, with a repechage used to determine the winner of two bronze medals. The two finalists face off for gold and silver medals. Each wrestler who loses to one of the two finalists moves into the repechage, culminating in a pair of bronze medal matches featuring the semifinal losers each facing the remaining repechage opponent from their half of the bracket.

== Results ==
Legend

- F — Won by fall

=== Final ===
Final
Haruna Okuno (JPN)	4
Jacarra Winchester (USA)	2

=== Top half ===
Round of 32
Aryna Martynava (AIN)	2
Haruna Okuno (JPN)	8

Round of 16
Karla Godinez (CAN)	5
Katarzyna Krawczyk (POL)	1
Haruna Okuno (JPN)	9
Chinboldyn Otgontuyaa (MGL)	2
Erika Bognár (HUN)	10
Emily Wanyama (KEN)	0
Melda Dernekçi (TUR)	5
Mariana Drăguțan (MDA)	8

Quarterfinals
Karla Godinez (CAN)	2
Haruna Okuno (JPN)	5
Erika Bognár (HUN)	3
Mariana Drăguțan (MDA)	8

Semifinals
Haruna Okuno (JPN)	6
Mariana Drăguțan (MDA)	0

=== Bottom half ===
Round of 32
Laura Stanelytė (LTU)	3
Anastasia Blayvas (GER)	11
Tetiana Profatilova (FRA)	4
Ekaterina Poleshchuk (AIN)	5

Round of 16
Marina Sedneva (KAZ)	0
Zhang Min (CHN)	10
Anastasia Blayvas (GER)	6
Shokhida Akhmedova (UZB)	5
Mariia Vynnyk (UKR)	2
Ekaterina Poleshchuk (AIN)	1
Neha Sharma (UWW)	2
Jacarra Winchester (USA)	7

Quarterfinals
Zhang Min (CHN)	8
Anastasia Blayvas (GER)	8
Mariia Vynnyk (UKR)	1
Jacarra Winchester (USA)	11

Semifinals
Anastasia Blayvas (GER)	0
Jacarra Winchester (USA)	10

=== Repechage ===
Repechage round 1
Aryna Martynava (AIN)	4
Chinboldyn Otgontuyaa (MGL)	2^{F}

Repechage round 2
Chinboldyn Otgontuyaa (MGL)	1
Karla Godinez (CAN)	5
Neha Sharma (UWW)	7
Mariia Vynnyk (UKR)	4

Bronze medals
Karla Godinez (CAN)	2
Mariana Drăguțan (MDA)	3
Neha Sharma (UWW)	2
Anastasia Blayvas (GER)	2

== Final standing ==
Rank	Athlete
1st place, gold medalist(s)	Haruna Okuno (JPN)
2nd place, silver medalist(s)	Jacarra Winchester (USA)
3rd place, bronze medalist(s)	Mariana Drăguțan (MDA)
3rd place, bronze medalist(s)	Anastasia Blayvas (GER)
5	Karla Godinez (CAN)
5	Neha Sharma (UWW)
7	Chinboldyn Otgontuyaa (MGL)
8	Zhang Min (CHN)
9	Erika Bognár (HUN)
10	Mariia Vynnyk (UKR)
11	Ekaterina Poleshchuk (AIN)
12	Aryna Martynava (AIN)
13	Shokhida Akhmedova (UZB)
14	Melda Dernekçi (TUR)
15	Tetiana Profatilova (FRA)
16	Laura Stanelytė (LTU)
17	Katarzyna Krawczyk (POL)
18	Marina Sedneva (KAZ)
19	Emily Wanyama (KEN)
