= 2022 European U23 Wrestling Championships =

2022 European U23 Championships
- Host city: Plovdiv, Bulgaria
- Dates: 7–13 March
- Stadium: Kolodruma

Champions
- Freestyle: Azerbaijan
- Greco-Roman: Georgia
- Women: Turkey

The 2022 European U23 Wrestling Championships was the 7th edition of the European U23 Wrestling Championships of combined events, and it took place from 7 to 13 March in Plovdiv, Bulgaria.

== Competition schedule ==
All times are (UTC+2)

Date	Time	Event
7 March	11.30-14.30	Qualification rounds: GR – 55,63,77,87,130 kg
7 March	17.15-17.45	Opening ceremony
7 March	18:00	Semi-finals: GR – 55,63,77,87,130 kg
8 March	11.30-14.30	Qualification rounds: GR – 60,67,72,82,97 kg; Repechage: GR – 55,63,77,87,130 kg
8 March	16.45-17.45	Semi-finals: GR – 60,67,72,82,97 kg
8 March	18.00-20.30	Finals: GR – 55,63,77,87,130 kg
9 March	11.30-14.00	Qualification rounds: WW – 50,55,59,68,76 kg; Repechage: GR – 60,67,72,82,97 kg
9 March	16.45-17.45	Semi-finals: WW – 50,55,59,68,76 kg
9 March	18.00-20.30	Finals: GR – 60,67,72,82,97 kg
10 March	11.30-14.00	Qualification rounds: WW – 53,57,62,65,72 kg; Repechage: WW – 50,55,59,68,76 kg
10 March	16.45-17.45	Semi-finals: WW – 53,57,62,65,72 kg
10 March	18.00-20.30	Finals: WW – 50,55,59,68,76 kg
11 March	11.30-14.00	Qualification rounds: FS – 57,65,70,79,97 kg; Repechage: WW – 53,57,62,65,72 kg
11 March	16.45-17.45	Semi-finals: FS – 57,65,70,79,97 kg
11 March	18.00-20.30	Finals: WW – 53,57,62,65,72 kg
12 March	11.30-14.00	Qualification rounds: FS – 61,74,86,92,125 kg; Repechage: FS – 57,65,70,79,97 kg
12 March	16.45-17.45	Semi-finals: FS – 61,74,86,92,125 kg
12 March	18.00-20.30	Finals: FS – 57,65,70,79,97 kg
13 March	16.30-17.45	Repechage: FS – 61,74,86,92,125 kg
13 March	18.00-20.30	Finals: FS – 61,74,86,92,125 kg
13 March	21.00	Final banquet

== Medal table ==
* Host nation (Bulgaria)

Rank	Nation	Gold	Silver	Bronze	Total
1	Azerbaijan	7	2	7	16
2	Georgia	6	5	4	15
3	Turkey	4	4	12	20
4	Hungary	3	2	5	10
5	Moldova	3	1	7	11
6	Poland	2	2	1	5
7	Germany	1	3	3	7
8	Romania	1	3	1	5
9	France	1	1	1	3
10	Netherlands	1	0	1	2
11	Greece	1	0	0	1
12	Armenia	0	2	5	7
13	Bulgaria*	0	1	3	4
14	Lithuania	0	1	1	2
14	Serbia	0	1	1	2
16	Austria	0	1	0	1
16	Denmark	0	1	0	1
18	Belgium	0	0	1	1
18	Estonia	0	0	1	1
18	Italy	0	0	1	1
18	Norway	0	0	1	1
18	Slovakia	0	0	1	1
18	Sweden	0	0	1	1
Totals (23 entries)		30	30	58	118

=== Team ranking ===
Rank	Men's freestyle		Men's Greco-Roman		Women's freestyle	
Rank	Team	Points	Team	Points	Team	Points
1	Azerbaijan	159	Georgia	183	Turkey	143
2	Turkey	151	Turkey	156	Hungary	120
3	Georgia	149	Azerbaijan	102	Poland	118
4	Armenia	108	Hungary	91	Moldova	96
5	Germany	93	Armenia	91	Azerbaijan	93
6	Moldova	93	Bulgaria	57	Romania	77
7	Bulgaria	82	Moldova	53	Germany	70
8	Hungary	51	Poland	49	France	56
9	North Macedonia	48	Germany	45	Bulgaria	47
10	France	40	Netherlands	40	Italy	43

== Medal overview ==
=== Men's freestyle ===
Event	Gold	Silver	Bronze
57 kg	Horst Lehr; Germany	Giorgi Gegelashvili; Georgia	Edik Harutyunyan; Armenia
57 kg	Horst Lehr; Germany	Giorgi Gegelashvili; Georgia	Tofig Aliyev; Azerbaijan
61 kg	Emrah Ormanoğlu; Turkey	Khamzat Arsamerzouev; France	Ramaz Turmanidze; Georgia
61 kg	Emrah Ormanoğlu; Turkey	Khamzat Arsamerzouev; France	Norik Harutyunyan; Armenia
65 kg	Ziraddin Bayramov; Azerbaijan	Hrachya Margaryan; Armenia	Ayub Musaev; Belgium
65 kg	Ziraddin Bayramov; Azerbaijan	Hrachya Margaryan; Armenia	Hamza Alaca; Turkey
70 kg	Giorgi Elbakidze; Georgia	Narek Harutyunyan; Armenia	Nicolai Grahmez; Moldova
70 kg	Giorgi Elbakidze; Georgia	Narek Harutyunyan; Armenia	Ivan Stoyanov; Bulgaria
74 kg	Dzhabrail Gadzhiev; Azerbaijan	Krisztian Biro; Romania	Vasile Diacon; Moldova
74 kg	Dzhabrail Gadzhiev; Azerbaijan	Krisztian Biro; Romania	İsmet Çiftçi; Turkey
79 kg	Georgios Kougioumtsidis; Greece	Evsem Shvelidze; Georgia	Ashraf Ashirov; Azerbaijan
79 kg	Georgios Kougioumtsidis; Greece	Evsem Shvelidze; Georgia	Abdulvasi Balta; Turkey
86 kg	Abubakr Abakarov; Azerbaijan	Lilian Balan; Moldova	Emre Çiftçi; Turkey
86 kg	Abubakr Abakarov; Azerbaijan	Lilian Balan; Moldova	Bagrati Gagnidze; Georgia
92 kg	Feyzullah Aktürk; Turkey	Joshua Morodion; Germany	Daviti Koguashvili; Georgia
92 kg	Feyzullah Aktürk; Turkey	Joshua Morodion; Germany	Ilia Hristov; Bulgaria
97 kg	Islam Ilyasov; Azerbaijan	Johannes Mayer; Germany	Radu Lefter; Moldova
97 kg	Islam Ilyasov; Azerbaijan	Johannes Mayer; Germany	Richárd Végh; Hungary
125 kg	Solomon Manashvili; Georgia	Milán Korcsog; Hungary	Adil Mısırcı; Turkey
125 kg	Solomon Manashvili; Georgia	Milán Korcsog; Hungary	Aydin Ahmadov; Azerbaijan

=== Men's Greco-Roman ===
Event	Gold	Silver	Bronze
55 kg	Emre Mutlu; Turkey	Denis Demirov; Bulgaria	Artiom Deleanu; Moldova
55 kg	Emre Mutlu; Turkey	Denis Demirov; Bulgaria	Denis Mihai; Romania
60 kg	Nihat Mammadli; Azerbaijan	Irakli Dzimistarishvili; Georgia	Vitalie Eriomenco; Moldova
60 kg	Nihat Mammadli; Azerbaijan	Irakli Dzimistarishvili; Georgia	Tigran Minasyan; Armenia
63 kg	Giorgi Shotadze; Georgia	Ziya Babashov; Azerbaijan	Mustafa Safa Yıldırım; Turkey
63 kg	Giorgi Shotadze; Georgia	Ziya Babashov; Azerbaijan	Ilia Mustakov; Bulgaria
67 kg	Diego Chkhikvadze; Georgia	Kadir Kamal; Turkey	Sahak Hovhannisyan; Armenia
67 kg	Diego Chkhikvadze; Georgia	Kadir Kamal; Turkey	Niklas Öhlén; Sweden
72 kg	Giorgi Chkhikvadze; Georgia	Abdullah Toprak; Turkey	Shant Khachatryan; Armenia
72 kg	Giorgi Chkhikvadze; Georgia	Abdullah Toprak; Turkey	Idris Ibaev; Germany
77 kg	Khasay Hasanli; Azerbaijan	Davit Sologashvili; Georgia	Krisztofer Klányi; Hungary
77 kg	Khasay Hasanli; Azerbaijan	Davit Sologashvili; Georgia	Abdurrahman Kalkan; Turkey
82 kg	Marcel Sterkenburg; Netherlands	Beka Guruli; Georgia	Semion Brekkeli; Moldova
82 kg	Marcel Sterkenburg; Netherlands	Beka Guruli; Georgia	Branko Kovačević; Serbia
87 kg	István Takács; Hungary	Turpal Bisultanov; Denmark	Lachin Valiyev; Azerbaijan
87 kg	István Takács; Hungary	Turpal Bisultanov; Denmark	Szymon Szymonowicz; Poland
97 kg	Giorgi Katsanashvili; Georgia	Markus Ragginger; Austria	Tyrone Sterkenburg; Netherlands
97 kg	Giorgi Katsanashvili; Georgia	Markus Ragginger; Austria	Mustafa Olgun; Turkey
130 kg	Dáriusz Vitek; Hungary	Fatih Bozkurt; Turkey	Giorgi Tsopurashvili; Georgia
130 kg	Dáriusz Vitek; Hungary	Fatih Bozkurt; Turkey	Sarkhan Mammadov; Azerbaijan

=== Women's freestyle ===
Event	Gold	Silver	Bronze
50 kg	Emma Luttenauer; France	Szimonetta Szekér; Hungary	Lisa Ersel; Germany
50 kg	Emma Luttenauer; France	Szimonetta Szekér; Hungary	Gabija Dilytė; Lithuania
53 kg	Mariana Drăguțan; Moldova	Anastasia Blayvas; Germany	Rahime Arı; Turkey
53 kg	Mariana Drăguțan; Moldova	Anastasia Blayvas; Germany	Gultakin Shirinova; Azerbaijan
55 kg	Andreea Ana; Romania	Elnura Mammadova; Azerbaijan	Mihaela Samoil; Moldova
55 kg	Andreea Ana; Romania	Elnura Mammadova; Azerbaijan	Zeynep Yetgil; Turkey
57 kg	Elvira Kamaloğlu; Turkey	Patrycja Gil; Poland	Tamara Dollák; Hungary
59 kg	Anastasia Nichita; Moldova	Magdalena Głodek; Poland	Morena De Vita; Italy
62 kg	Zhala Aliyeva; Azerbaijan	Ana Fabijan; Serbia	Améline Douarre; France
62 kg	Zhala Aliyeva; Azerbaijan	Ana Fabijan; Serbia	Luisa Scheel; Germany
65 kg	Ewelina Ciunek; Poland	Amina Capezan; Romania	Yağmur Çakmak; Turkey
65 kg	Ewelina Ciunek; Poland	Amina Capezan; Romania	Viktoria Vesso; Estonia
68 kg	Irina Rîngaci; Moldova	Aslı Demir; Turkey	Noémi Szabados; Hungary
68 kg	Irina Rîngaci; Moldova	Aslı Demir; Turkey	Nigar Mirzazada; Azerbaijan
72 kg	Wiktoria Chołuj; Poland	Larisa Niţu; Romania	Zsuzsanna Molnár; Slovakia
72 kg	Wiktoria Chołuj; Poland	Larisa Niţu; Romania	Emese Elekes; Hungary
76 kg	Bernadett Nagy; Hungary	Kamilė Gaučaitė; Lithuania	Mehtap Gültekin; Turkey
76 kg	Bernadett Nagy; Hungary	Kamilė Gaučaitė; Lithuania	Marion Bye; Norway

== Participating nations ==
319 competitors from 34 nations participated

- Albania (2)
- Armenia (17)
- Austria (4)
- Azerbaijan (21)
- Belgium (1)
- Bulgaria (26)
- Croatia (3)
- Czech Republic (1)
- Denmark (1)
- Spain (6)
- Estonia (6)
- Finland (3)
- France (11)
- United Kingdom (1)
- Georgia (20)
- Germany (19)
- Greece (10)
- Hungary (23)
- Israel (7)
- Italy (11)
- Kosovo (1)
- Latvia (4)
- Lithuania (7)
- Moldova (20)
- North Macedonia (7)
- Netherlands (2)
- Norway (5)
- Poland (18)
- Romania (10)
- Serbia (6)
- Switzerland (6)
- Slovakia (4)
- Sweden (4)
- Turkey (30)

== Results ==
Legend

- C — Won by 3 cautions given to the opponent
- F — Won by fall
- R — Retired
- WO — Won by walkover

=== Men's freestyle ===
==== Men's freestyle 57 kg ====
Main bracket

Round of 16
Edik Harutyunyan (ARM)	4
Giorgi Gegelashvili (GEO)	9

Quarterfinals
Aid Salihasi (MKD)	0
Giorgi Gegelashvili (GEO)	11
Yusuf Demir (TUR)	10^{F}
Thomas Epp (SUI)	2
Tofig Aliyev (AZE)	2
Horst Lehr (GER)	4^{F}
Demian Liutcanov (MDA)	14
Ivaylo Tisov (BUL)	12^{F}

Semifinals
Giorgi Gegelashvili (GEO)	10
Yusuf Demir (TUR)	0
Horst Lehr (GER)	12
Ivaylo Tisov (BUL)	1

Final
Giorgi Gegelashvili (GEO)	2
Horst Lehr (GER)	2

Repechage round
Edik Harutyunyan (ARM)	10
Aid Salihasi (MKD)	0

Bronze medal match
Edik Harutyunyan (ARM)	10
Yusuf Demir (TUR)	0
Tofig Aliyev (AZE)	18
Ivaylo Tisov (BUL)	8

==== Men's freestyle 61 kg ====
Main bracket

Round of 16
Emrah Ormanoğlu (TUR)	4
Ruhan Rasim (BUL)	3
Norik Harutyunyan (ARM)	12
Leonid Colesnic (MDA)	9

Quarterfinals
Nico Megerle (GER)	3
Emrah Ormanoğlu (TUR)	5
Nino Leutert (SUI)	0
Ramaz Turmanidze (GEO)	11
Endrio Avdyli (ALB)	0
Besir Alili (MKD)	10
Norik Harutyunyan (ARM)	4
Khamzat Arsamerzouev (FRA)	5

Semifinals
Emrah Ormanoğlu (TUR)	5
Ramaz Turmanidze (GEO)	2
Besir Alili (MKD)	2
Khamzat Arsamerzouev (FRA)	5

Final
Emrah Ormanoğlu (TUR)	4
Khamzat Arsamerzouev (FRA)	1

Repechage round
Ruhan Rasim (BUL)	5
Nico Megerle (GER)	2

Bronze medal match
Ruhan Rasim (BUL)	0
Ramaz Turmanidze (GEO)	10
Norik Harutyunyan (ARM)	10
Besir Alili (MKD)	0

==== Men's freestyle 65 kg ====
Main bracket

Round of 16
Károly Kiss (HUN)	0
Ayub Musaev (BEL)	10
Daniel Raffi (ITA)	2
Leon Gerstenberger (GER)	12
Hrachya Margaryan (ARM)	10
Dominik Laritz (SUI)	2
Stilyan Iliev (BUL)	1
Ziraddin Bayramov (AZE)	12
Gia Ugrelidze (GEO)	5
Hamza Alaca (TUR)	8
Ștefan Coman (ROU)	9
Pavel Andrușca (MDA)	5

Quarterfinals
Said Hosseini (FIN)	1
Ayub Musaev (BEL)	12
Leon Gerstenberger (GER)	1
Hrachya Margaryan (ARM)	11
Ziraddin Bayramov (AZE)	11
Hamza Alaca (TUR)	8
Ștefan Coman (ROU)	4
Marwane Yezza (FRA)	6

Semifinals
Ayub Musaev (BEL)	2
Hrachya Margaryan (ARM)	4
Ziraddin Bayramov (AZE)	6
Marwane Yezza (FRA)	2

Final
Hrachya Margaryan (ARM)	1
Ziraddin Bayramov (AZE)	4

Repechage round
Dominik Laritz (SUI)	6
Leon Gerstenberger (GER)	7
Stilyan Iliev (BUL)	0
Hamza Alaca (TUR)	10

Bronze medal match
Leon Gerstenberger (GER)	1
Ayub Musaev (BEL)	9
Hamza Alaca (TUR)	3
Marwane Yezza (FRA)	1^{R}

==== Men's freestyle 70 kg ====
Main bracket

Round of 16
Gianluca Coletti (ITA)	0
Giorgi Elbakidze (GEO)	10
Raul Zarbalie (ISR)	2
Ömer Faruk Çayır (TUR)	13
Roland Biro (HUN)	0
Nicolai Grahmez (MDA)	4^{F}
Murad Evloev (AZE)	4
Tobias Portmann (SUI)	4
Viktor Voinović (SRB)	0
Fati Vejseli (MKD)	10

Quarterfinals
Benedikt Huber (AUT)	1
Giorgi Elbakidze (GEO)	12
Ömer Faruk Çayır (TUR)	0
Nicolai Grahmez (MDA)	4^{F}
Ivan Stoyanov (BUL)	9
Murad Evloev (AZE)	5
Fati Vejseli (MKD)	6
Narek Harutyunyan (ARM)	8

Semifinals
Giorgi Elbakidze (GEO)	9
Nicolai Grahmez (MDA)	7
Ivan Stoyanov (BUL)	2
Narek Harutyunyan (ARM)	6

Final
Giorgi Elbakidze (GEO)	6
Narek Harutyunyan (ARM)	5

Repechage round
Gianluca Coletti (ITA)	5
Benedikt Huber (AUT)	8^{F}

Bronze medal match
Benedikt Huber (AUT)	0
Nicolai Grahmez (MDA)	10
Fati Vejseli (MKD)	1
Ivan Stoyanov (BUL)	1

==== Men's freestyle 74 kg ====
Main bracket

Round of 16
Vasile Diacon (MDA)	7
Krisztian Biro (ROU)	8
Otari Bagauri (GEO)	2
Dimitar Angelov (BUL)	6^{F}
İsmet Çiftçi (TUR)	6
Erik Reinbok (EST)	4
Menua Yaribekyan (ARM)	2
Dzhabrail Gadzhiev (AZE)	12

Quarterfinals
Bálint Nemes (HUN)	1
Krisztian Biro (ROU)	12
Dimitar Angelov (BUL)	6
Tino Rettinger (GER)	4
Szymon Wojtkowski (POL)	7
İsmet Çiftçi (TUR)	10
Dzhabrail Gadzhiev (AZE)	4
Simon Marchl (AUT)	3

Semifinals
Krisztian Biro (ROU)	11
Dimitar Angelov (BUL)	0
İsmet Çiftçi (TUR)	3
Dzhabrail Gadzhiev (AZE)	7

Final
Krisztian Biro (ROU)	1
Dzhabrail Gadzhiev (AZE)	8

Repechage round
Vasile Diacon (MDA)	12
Bálint Nemes (HUN)	1
'Menua Yaribekyan (ARM)	8
Simon Marchl (AUT)	2

Bronze medal match
Vasile Diacon (MDA)	9
Dimitar Angelov (BUL)	3
Menua Yaribekyan (ARM)	1
İsmet Çiftçi (TUR)	3

==== Men's freestyle 79 kg ====
Main bracket

Round of 16
Evsem Shvelidze (GEO)	6
Beat Schaible (GER)	2
Abdulvasi Balta (TUR)	3
Georgios Kougioumtsidis (GRE)	13^{F}

Quarterfinals
Ashraf Ashirov (AZE)	8
Evsem Shvelidze (GEO)	9
Grigori Carastoian (MDA)	0
Oktay Hasan (BUL)	8
Patryk Ciurzyński (POL)	5
Mushegh Mkrtchyan (ARM)	10
Georgios Kougioumtsidis (GRE)	10
Márton Rizmajer (HUN)	0

Semifinals
Evsem Shvelidze (GEO)	3
Oktay Ruzhdi Hasan (BUL)	1
Mushegh Mkrtchyan (ARM)	7
Georgios Kougioumtsidis (GRE)	10

Final
Evsem Shvelidze (GEO)	9
Georgios Kougioumtsidis (GRE)	16

Repechage round
Beat Schaible (GER)	0
Ashraf Ashirov (AZE)	10
Abdulvasi Balta (TUR)	3
Márton Rizmajer (HUN)	1

Bronze medal match
Ashraf Ashirov (AZE)	14
Oktay Hasan (BUL)	3
Abdulvasi Balta (TUR)	2
Mushegh Mkrtchyan (ARM)	1

==== Men's freestyle 86 kg ====
Main bracket

Round of 16
Cezary Sadowski (POL)	3
Lars Schäfle (GER)	2
Angelos Kouklaris (GRE)	0
Rakhim Magamadov (FRA)	10
Abubakr Abakarov (AZE)	10
Hristo Iliev (BUL)	0
Lilian Balan (MDA)	11
Auron Syla (KOS)	0
Milán Mester (HUN)	1
Mher Markosyan (ARM)	3^{F}
Ivars Samušonoks (LAT)	4
Bagrati Gagnidze (GEO)	9

Quarterfinals
Emre Çiftçi (TUR)	7
Cezary Sadowski (POL)	1
Rakhim Magamadov (FRA)	0
Abubakr Abakarov (AZE)	6
Lilian Balan (MDA)	3
Mher Markosyan (ARM)	2
Bagrati Gagnidze (GEO)	13
Benjamin Greil (AUT)	9

Semifinals
Emre Çiftçi (TUR)	2
Abubakr Abakarov (AZE)	14
Lilian Balan (MDA)	7^{F}
Bagrati Gagnidze (GEO)	3

Final
Abubakr Abakarov (AZE)	10
Lilian Balan (MDA)	0

Repechage round
Hristo Iliev (BUL)	0
Rakhim Magamadov (FRA)	10
Auron Syla (KOS)	0
Mher Markosyan (ARM)	10

Bronze medal match
Rakhim Magamadov (FRA)	3
Emre Çiftçi (TUR)	4
Mher Markosyan (ARM)	2
Bagrati Gagnidze (GEO)	7

==== Men's freestyle 92 kg ====
Main bracket

Round of 16
Feyzullah Aktürk (TUR)	10
Redjep Hajdari (MKD)	0
Emiljano Onuzi (ALB)	0
Abduljalil Shabanov (AZE)	10
Adlan Viskhanov (FRA)	0
Ilia Hristov (BUL)	10
Stelios Stamatis (GRE)	0
Gheorghe Erhan (MDA)	4^{F}

Quarterfinals
Viliam Oross (SVK)	0
Feyzullah Aktürk (TUR)	10
Abduljalil Shabanov (AZE)	2
Daviti Koguashvili (GEO)	13
Joshua Morodion (GER)	11
Ilia Hristov (BUL)	2
Gheorghe Erhan (MDA)	4
Krisztián Angyal (HUN)	1

Semifinals
Feyzullah Aktürk (TUR)	11
Daviti Koguashvili (GEO)	0
Joshua Morodion (GER)	14
Gheorghe Erhan (MDA)	4

Final
Feyzullah Aktürk (TUR)	10
Joshua Morodion (GER)	0

Repechage round
Redjep Hajdari (MKD)	12
Viliam Oross (SVK)	1

Bronze medal match
Redjep Hajdari (MKD)	0
Daviti Koguashvili (GEO)	10^{F}
Ilia Hristov (BUL)	4^{F}
Gheorghe Erhan (MDA)	1

==== Men's freestyle 97 kg ====
Main bracket

Quarterfinals		Semifinals		Final
Radu Lefter (MDA)	10^{F}
Tsvetan Evtimov (BUL)	4	Radu Lefter (MDA)	3
Stole Eftimov (MKD)	0	Johannes Mayer (GER)	5
Johannes Mayer (GER)	10			Johannes Mayer (GER)	3
Samet Ocak (TUR)	4			Islam Ilyasov (AZE)	5
Richárd Végh (HUN)	6	Richárd Végh (HUN)	1
Riveri Mtsituri (GEO)	0	Islam Ilyasov (AZE)	6
Islam Ilyasov (AZE)	5

Bronze medal match
Stole Eftimov (MKD)	0
Radu Lefter (MDA)	10
Riveri Mtsituri (GEO)	4
Richárd Végh (HUN)	7

==== Men's freestyle 125 kg ====
Main bracket

Round of 16
Adil Mısırcı (TUR)	5
Georgi Ivanov (BUL)	4

Quarterfinals
Uvejs Fejzullahu (MKD)	0
Adil Mısırcı (TUR)	11
Milán Korcsog (HUN)	11
Lior Altshuler (ISR)	0
Hovhannes Maghakyan (ARM)	1
Aydin Ahmadov (AZE)	5
Solomon Manashvili (GEO)	10
Azamat Khosonov (GRE)	7

Semifinals
Adil Mısırcı (TUR)	2
Milán Korcsog (HUN)	9
Aydin Ahmadov (AZE)	5
Solomon Manashvili (GEO)	9

Final
Milán Korcsog (HUN)	1
Solomon Manashvili (GEO)	8

Bronze medal match
Lior Altshuler (ISR)	3
Adil Mısırcı (TUR)	7
Azamat Khosonov (GRE)	3
Aydin Ahmadov (AZE)	7

=== Men's Greco-Roman ===
==== Men's Greco-Roman 55 kg ====
Main bracket

Quarterfinals		Semifinals		Final
Artiom Deleanu (MDA)	9
Ilias Zairakis (GRE)	0	Artiom Deleanu (MDA)	7
Emre Mutlu (TUR)	9	Emre Mutlu (TUR)	11
Steven Ecker (GER)	0			Emre Mutlu (TUR)	12^{F}
Denis Demirov (BUL)	12			Denis Demirov (BUL)	6
Azat Sedrakyan (ARM)	7	Denis Demirov (BUL)	9
Denis Mihai (ROU)	7	Denis Mihai (ROU)	6
Akaki Osiashvili (GEO)	4

Bronze medal match
Steven Ecker (GER)	6
Artiom Deleanu (MDA)	7
Azat Sedrakyan (ARM)	0
Denis Mihai (ROU)	6

==== Men's Greco-Roman 60 kg ====
Main bracket

Round of 16
Miroslav Emilov (BUL)	3
Melkamu Fetene (ISR)	12

Quarterfinals
Vitalie Eriomenco (MDA)	7
Melkamu Fetene (ISR)	2
Irakli Dzimistarishvili (GEO)	6
Mükremin Aktaş (TUR)	3
Nihat Mammadli (AZE)	5
Krisztián Kecskeméti (HUN)	1
Tigran Minasyan (ARM)	5
Grzegorz Kunkel (POL)	5

Semifinals
Vitalie Eriomenco (MDA)	0
Irakli Dzimistarishvili (GEO)	9
Nihat Mammadli (AZE)	9
Tigran Minasyan (ARM)	0

Final
Irakli Dzimistarishvili (GEO)	0
Nihat Mammadli (AZE)	10

Bronze medal match
Mükremin Aktaş (TUR)	4
Vitalie Eriomenco (MDA)	6
Krisztián Kecskeméti (HUN)	6
Tigran Minasyan (ARM)	7

==== Men's Greco-Roman 63 kg ====
Main bracket

Round of 16
Andy Juan (ESP)	0
Vladimir Haroyan (ARM)	8

Quarterfinals
Giorgi Shotadze (GEO)	5
Vladimir Haroyan (ARM)	0
Mustafa Safa Yıldırım (TUR)	3
Corneliu Rusu (MDA)	1
Abere Fetene (ISR)	2
Ziya Babashov (AZE)	9
Levente Tóth (HUN)	1
Ilia Mustakov (BUL)	3

Semifinals
Giorgi Shotadze (GEO)	6
Mustafa Safa Yıldırım (TUR)	3
Ziya Babashov (AZE)	6
Ilia Mustakov (BUL)	1

Final
Giorgi Shotadze (GEO)	3
Ziya Babashov (AZE)	0

Bronze medal match
Vladimir Haroyan (ARM)	1
Mustafa Safa Yıldırım (TUR)	3
Abere Fetene (ISR)	5
Ilia Mustakov (BUL)	9

==== Men's Greco-Roman 67 kg ====
Main bracket

Round of 16
Sahak Hovhannisyan (ARM)	5
Nikalas Sulev (BUL)	1
Nikolaos Kalaidopoulos (GRE)	0
Niklas Oehlen (SWE)	9
Kadir Kamal (TUR)	6
Gagik Snjoyan (FRA)	1

Quarterfinals
Diego Chkhikvadze (GEO)	5
Sahak Hovhannisyan (ARM)	5
Shon Nadorgin (ISR)	3
Ignazio Sanfilippo (ITA)	3
Kamil Czarnecki (POL)	4
Niklas Öhlén (SWE)	10
Kadir Kamal (TUR)	8
Konstantinas Kešanidi (LTU)	0

Semifinals
Diego Chkhikvadze (GEO)	9
Ignazio Sanfilippo (ITA)	0
Niklas Öhlén (SWE)	1
Kadir Kamal (TUR)	8

Final
Diego Chkhikvadze (GEO)	3
Kadir Kamal (TUR)	2

Repechage round
~~Gagik Snjoyan (FRA)~~
Konstantinas Kešanidi (LTU)	WO

Bronze medal match
Sahak Hovhannisyan (ARM)	5
Ignazio Sanfilippo (ITA)	3
Konstantinas Kešanidi (LTU)	0
Niklas Öhlén (SWE)	9

==== Men's Greco-Roman 72 kg ====
Final

Final
Abdullah Toprak (TUR)	5
Giorgi Chkhikvadze (GEO)	7

Top half

Round of 32
Dimitar Stefchev (BUL)	2
Shant Khachatryan (ARM)	11

Round of 16
Michael Portmann (SUI)	10
Marcos Sánchez-Silva (ESP)	0
Shant Khachatryan (ARM)	9
Valentin Petic (MDA)	0
Adam Hajizada (AZE)	5
Attila Tösmagi (HUN)	7
Abdullah Toprak (TUR)	10
Steve Momilia (ITA)	1

Quarterfinals
Michael Portmann (SUI)	0
Shant Khachatryan (ARM)	8
Attila Tösmagi (HUN)	5
Abdullah Toprak (TUR)	9

Semifinals
Shant Khachatryan (ARM)	0
Abdullah Toprak (TUR)	4

Bottom half

Round of 32
Aleksander Mielewczyk (POL)	0
Georgios Sotiriadis (GRE)	5

Round of 16
Joni Komppa (FIN)	0
Idris Ibaev (GER)	11
Giorgi Chkhikvadze (GEO)	6
Vilius Savickas (LTU)	0
Pavel Puklavec (CRO)	8
Georgios Sotiriadis (GRE)	0
Erik Persson (SWE)	1
Håvard Jørgensen (NOR)	1

Quarterfinals
Idris Ibaev (GER)	3
Giorgi Chkhikvadze (GEO)	9
Pavel Puklavec (CRO)	5
Håvard Jørgensen (NOR)	7

Semifinals
Giorgi Chkhikvadze (GEO)	7
Håvard Jørgensen (NOR)	0

Repechage round 2
Steve Momilia (ITA)	0
Attila Tösmagi (HUN)	11
Vilius Savickas (LTU)	0
Idris Ibaev (GER)	8

Bronze medal match
Attila Tösmagi (HUN)	2
Shant Khachatryan (ARM)	8^{F}
Idris Ibaev (GER)	2
Håvard Jørgensen (NOR)	1

==== Men's Greco-Roman 77 kg ====
Main bracket

Round of 16
Khasay Hasanli (AZE)	9
Martin Dimitrov (BUL)	0
Mihai Petic (MDA)	0
Aleksa Ilić (SRB)	10
Deni Nakaev (GER)	9
Rasmus Åström (SWE)	0
Abdurrahman Kalkan (TUR)	8
Niko Nikoladze (ISR)	0
Ashot Kirakosyan (ARM)	5
Edvin Kin (EST)	1
Patryk Bednarz (POL)	9
Andreas Vasilakopoulos (GRE)	0
Davit Sologashvili (GEO)	7
Akseli Yli-Hannuksela (FIN)	1

Quarterfinals
Krisztofer Klányi (HUN)	0
Khasay Hasanli (AZE)	7
Aleksa Ilić (SRB)	3
Deni Nakaev (GER)	1
Abdurrahman Kalkan (TUR)	9
Ashot Kirakosyan (ARM)	0
Patryk Bednarz (POL)	2
Davit Sologashvili (GEO)	5

Semifinals
Khasay Hasanli (AZE)	5
Aleksa Ilić (SRB)	1
Abdurrahman Kalkan (TUR)	3
Davit Sologashvili (GEO)	5

Final
Khasay Hasanli (AZE)	10
Davit Sologashvili (GEO)	0

Repechage round
Martin Dimitrov (BUL)	1
Krisztofer Klányi (HUN)	4
Akseli Yli-Hannuksela (FIN)	0
Patryk Bednarz (POL)	9

Bronze medal match
Krisztofer Klányi (HUN)	4
Aleksa Ilić (SRB)	1
Patryk Bednarz (POL)	0
Abdurrahman Kalkan (TUR)	5

==== Men's Greco-Roman 82 kg ====
Main bracket

Round of 16
Semion Brekkeli (MDA)	7^{F}
Karlo Kodrić (CRO)	4
Dominik Mezei (HUN)	1
Vasile Cojoc (ROU)	3
Zahari Zashev (BUL)	3
Ilias Pagkalidis (GRE)	3
Samet Yaldıran (TUR)	5
Arminas Lygnugaris (LTU)	1
Gagik Hakobyan (ARM)	2
Branko Kovačević (SRB)	11
Exauce Mukubu (NOR)	1
Erik Löser (GER)	3
Beka Guruli (GEO)	5
David Zhytomyrsky (ISR)	0

Quarterfinals
Marcel Sterkenburg (NED)	8
Semion Brekkeli (MDA)	0
Vasile Cojoc (ROU)	2^{F}
Zahari Zashev (BUL)	1
Samet Yaldıran (TUR)	1
Branko Kovačević (SRB)	10
Erik Löser (GER)	4
Beka Guruli (GEO)	4

Semifinals
Marcel Sterkenburg (NED)	8
Vasile Cojoc (ROU)	0
Branko Kovačević (SRB)	3
Beka Guruli (GEO)	3

Final
Marcel Sterkenburg (NED)	6
Beka Guruli (GEO)	1

Repechage round 1
David Zhytomyrsky (ISR)	0
Erik Löser (GER)	7

Bronze medal match
Semion Brekkeli (MDA)	1
Vasile Cojoc (ROU)	1
Erik Löser (GER)	3
Branko Kovačević (SRB)	6

==== Men's Greco-Roman 87 kg ====
Main bracket

Round of 16
Beka Melelashvili (GEO)	0
Gevorg Tadevosyan (ARM)	9
Kaloyan Ivanov (BUL)	0
Muhittin Sarıçiçek (TUR)	8
Lachin Valiyev (AZE)	2
Turpal Bisultanov (DEN)	10
Andreas Välis (EST)	1
Szymon Szymonowicz (POL)	3
Mario Vuković (SRB)	3
Christian Zemp (SUI)	5
Ruben Been (NOR)	0
Matej Mandić (CRO)	8

Quarterfinals
Saba Djavakhichvili (FRA)	0
Gevorg Tadevosyan (ARM)	8
Muhittin Sarıçiçek (TUR)	5
Turpal Bisultanov (DEN)	11^{F}
Szymon Szymonowicz (POL)	9
Christian Zemp (SUI)	0
Matej Mandić (CRO)	0
István Takács (HUN)	8

Semifinals
Gevorg Tadevosyan (ARM)	0
Turpal Bisultanov (DEN)	7
Szymon Szymonowicz (POL)	1
István Takács (HUN)	3

Final
Turpal Bisultanov (DEN)	4
István Takács (HUN)	5

Repechage round
Lachin Valiyev (AZE)	7^{F}
Muhittin Sarıçiçek (TUR)	5

Bronze medal match
Lachin Valiyev (AZE)	6
Gevorg Tadevosyan (ARM)	5
Matej Mandić (CRO)	0
Szymon Szymonowicz (POL)	8

==== Men's Greco-Roman 97 kg ====
Main bracket

Round of 16
Mariyan Marinov (BUL)	0
Hayk Khloyan (ARM)	5
Loïc Samen (FRA)	1
Arnoldas Baranovas (LTU)	2
Giorgi Katsanashvili (GEO)	8
Marcus Worren (NOR)	0
Patrick Neumaier (GER)	3
Richard Karelson (EST)	5
Gerard Kurniczak (POL)	0
Markus Ragginger (AUT)	9

Quarterfinals
Tyrone Sterkenburg (NED)	4
Hayk Khloyan (ARM)	1
Arnoldas Baranovas (LTU)	0
Giorgi Katsanashvili (GEO)	8
Aleksandar Simović (SRB)	4
Richard Karelson (EST)	6
Markus Ragginger (AUT)	5
Mustafa Olgun (TUR)	1

Semifinals
Tyrone Sterkenburg (NED)	0
Giorgi Katsanashvili (GEO)	4
Richard Karelson (EST)	0
Markus Ragginger (AUT)	9

Final
Giorgi Katsanashvili (GEO)	5
Markus Ragginger (AUT)	3

Repechage round
Marcus Worren (NOR)	9
Arnoldas Baranovas (LTU)	0
Gerard Kurniczak (POL)	2
Mustafa Olgun (TUR)	4

Bronze medal match
Marcus Worren (NOR)	1
Tyrone Sterkenburg (NED)	5
Mustafa Olgun (TUR)	9
Richard Karelson (EST)	0

==== Men's Greco-Roman 130 kg ====
Main bracket

Round of 16
Emiliyan Lazarov (BUL)	0
Dáriusz Vitek (HUN)	11^{F}

Quarterfinals
Tomasz Wawrzyńczyk (POL)	1
Dáriusz Vitek (HUN)	1
Alberto Meta (ITA)	0
Giorgi Tsopurashvili (GEO)	8
Nikolaos Ntounias (GRE)	0
Fatih Bozkurt (TUR)	8
Sarkhan Mammadov (AZE)	13
Marcel Albini (CZE)	5

Semifinals
Dáriusz Vitek (HUN)	5
Giorgi Tsopurashvili (GEO)	2
Fatih Bozkurt (TUR)	13
Sarkhan Mammadov (AZE)	6

Final
Dáriusz Vitek (HUN)	1
Fatih Bozkurt (TUR)	1

Repechage round
Emiliyan Lazarov (BUL)	4
Tomasz Wawrzyńczyk (POL)	4^{F}

Bronze medal match
Tomasz Wawrzyńczyk (POL)	1
Giorgi Tsopurashvili (GEO)	1
Nikolaos Ntounias (GRE)	1
Sarkhan Mammadov (AZE)	6

=== Women's freestyle ===
==== Women's freestyle 50 kg ====
Main bracket

Round of 16
Szimonetta Szekér (HUN)	6
Lisa Ersel (GER)	3
Emma Luttenauer (FRA)	3
Amanda Tomczyk (POL)	1
Zehra Demirhan (TUR)	6^{F}
Denisa Fodor (ROU)	4

Quarterfinals
Maria Leorda (MDA)	3
Szimonetta Szekér (HUN)	4
Shahana Nazarova (AZE)	13
Marija Spirkovska (MKD)	2
Gabija Dilytė (LTU)	0
Emma Luttenauer (FRA)	4
Zehra Demirhan (TUR)	13^{F}
Emanuela Liuzzi (ITA)	6

Semifinals
Szimonetta Szekér (HUN)	8^{F}
Shahana Nazarova (AZE)	0
Emma Luttenauer (FRA)	5
Zehra Demirhan (TUR)	2

Final
Szimonetta Szekér (HUN)	0
Emma Luttenauer (FRA)	3

Repechage round
Lisa Ersel (GER)	4
Maria Leorda (MDA)	0
Amanda Tomczyk (POL)	2
Gabija Dilytė (LTU)	3

Bronze medal match
Lisa Ersel (GER)	9
Shahana Nazarova (AZE)	8
Gabija Dilytė (LTU)	2^{F}
Zehra Demirhan (TUR)	6

==== Women's freestyle 53 kg ====
Main bracket

Quarterfinals		Semifinals		Final
Rahime Arı (TUR)	8
Carmen Di Dio (ITA)	1	Rahime Arı (TUR)	1
Mariana Drăguțan (MDA)	2^{F}	Mariana Drăguțan (MDA)	6
Nazife Tair (BUL)	0			Mariana Drăguțan (MDA)	10
Gultakin Shirinova (AZE)	12^{F}			Anastasia Blayvas (GER)	0
Chadia Ayachi (FRA)	7	Gultakin Shirinova (AZE)	6
Beatrice Ferenţ (ROU)	4	Anastasia Blayvas (GER)	6^{F}
Anastasia Blayvas (GER)	11

Bronze medal match
Nazife Tair (BUL)	1
Rahime Arı (TUR)	4
Beatrice Ferenţ (ROU)	1
Gultakin Shirinova (AZE)	11

==== Women's freestyle 55 kg ====
Main bracket

Round of 16
Irena Binkova (BUL)	0
Erika Bognár (HUN)	10
Zeynep Yetgil (TUR)	10^{F}
Laura Stanelytė (LTU)	0
Wiktoria Karwowska (POL)	1
Nova Bergman (SWE)	12^{F}

Quarterfinals
Mihaela Samoil (MDA)	9
Erika Bognár (HUN)	4
Elnura Mammadova (AZE)	10
Maria Martynchuk (SVK)	3^{R}
Othelie Høie (NOR)	1
Zeynep Yetgil (TUR)	6
Nova Bergman (SWE)	1
Andreea Ana (ROU)	9

Semifinals
Mihaela Samoil (MDA)	4
Elnura Mammadova (AZE)	11
Zeynep Yetgil (TUR)	1
Andreea Ana (ROU)	2

Final
Elnura Mammadova (AZE)	0
Andreea Ana (ROU)	12

Bronze medal match
Maria Martynchuk (SVK)
Mihaela Samoil (MDA)	WO
Nova Bergman (SWE)	1
Zeynep Yetgil (TUR)	3

==== Women's freestyle 57 kg ====
Nordic group

Pos	Athlete	Pld	W	L	CP	TP	TUR	POL	HUN	BUL	ESP
1	Elvira Kamaloğlu (TUR)	4	4	0	12	21	—	6–6	8–6	3–0	4–0
2	Patrycja Gil (POL)	4	3	1	13	37	1–3 PO1	—	13–2	8–0	10–0
3	Tamara Dollák (HUN)	4	2	2	10	28	1–3 PO1	1–4 SU1	—	10–8	10–2 Fall
4	Sezen Belberova (BUL)	4	1	3	4	11	0–3 PO	0–3 PO	1–3 PO1	—	3–0
5	Victoria Báez (ESP)	4	0	4	0	2	0–3 PO	0–4 SU	0–5 FA	0–3 PO	—

Source: UWW

==== Women's freestyle 59 kg ====
Elimination groups

Group A

Pos	Athlete	Pld	W	L	CP	TP	ITA	HUN	TUR
1	Morena De Vita (ITA)	2	2	0	6	17	—	7–6	10–8
2	Anna Szél (HUN)	2	1	1	6	11	1–3 PO1	—	5–0 Fall
3	Ebru Dağbaşı (TUR)	2	0	2	1	8	1–3 PO1	0–5 FA	—

Source: UWW

Group B

Pos	Athlete	Pld	W	L	CP	TP	MDA	POL	BUL
1	Anastasia Nichita (MDA)	2	2	0	10	10	—	2–1 Fall	8–0 Fall
2	Magdalena Głodek (POL)	2	1	1	4	11	0–5 FA	—	10–0
3	Fatme Shaban (BUL)	2	0	2	0	0	0–5 FA	0–4 SU	—

Source: UWW

Knockout round

Semifinals
Morena De Vita (ITA)	9
Magdalena Głodek (POL)	10
Anastasia Nichita (MDA)	WO
Anna Szél (HUN)

Finals
Magdalena Głodek (POL)	0
Anastasia Nichita (MDA)	12
Bronze medal match
Morena De Vita (ITA)	WO
Anna Szél (HUN)

==== Women's freestyle 62 kg ====
Main bracket

Round of 16
Viktoria Øverby (NOR)	2
Améline Douarre (FRA)	9
Merve Karadeniz (TUR)	5
Kelsey Barnes (GBR)	0

Quarterfinals
Zhala Aliyeva (AZE)	6^{F}
Améline Douarre (FRA)	0
Paulina Danisz (POL)	2^{F}
Alīna Antipova (LAT)	1
Nikolett Szabó (HUN)	0
Ana Fabijan (SRB)	4
Merve Karadeniz (TUR)	1
Luisa Scheel (GER)	5

Semifinals
Zhala Aliyeva (AZE)	6
Paulina Danisz (POL)	1
Ana Fabijan (SRB)	9^{F}
Luisa Scheel (GER)	0

Final
Zhala Aliyeva (AZE)	6
Ana Fabijan (SRB)	2

Bronze medal match
Améline Douarre (FRA)	2
Paulina Danisz (POL)	1
Nikolett Szabó (HUN)	3
Luisa Scheel (GER)	5

==== Women's freestyle 65 kg ====
Main bracket

Round of 16
Elena Esposito (ITA)	2
Elma Zeidlere (LAT)	3^{F}

Quarterfinals
Amina Capezan (ROU)	4
Elma Zeidlere (LAT)	1
Chiara Hirt (GER)	4
Yağmur Çakmak (TUR)	9
Viktoria Vesso (EST)	7
Birgul Soltanova (AZE)	7
Nerea Pampín (ESP)	0
Ewelina Ciunek (POL)	11

Semifinals
Amina Capezan (ROU)	4
Yağmur Çakmak (TUR)	2
Viktoria Vesso (EST)	8
Ewelina Ciunek (POL)	13

Final
Amina Capezan (ROU)	12
Ewelina Ciunek (POL)	14

Bronze medal match
Elma Zeidlere (LAT)	1
Yağmur Çakmak (TUR)	3
Nerea Blanco (ESP)	0
Viktoria Vesso (EST)	11

==== Women's freestyle 68 kg ====
Main bracket

Round of 16
Irina Rîngaci (MDA)	10
Adina Irimia (ROU)	0
Karolina Kozłowska (POL)	0
Aslı Demir (TUR)	11

Quarterfinals
Noémi Szabados (HUN)	2
Irina Rîngaci (MDA)	12
Sophia Schäfle (GER)	11
Siyka Ivanova (BUL)	0
Nigar Mirzazada (AZE)	4
Olha Maslovská (SVK)	1
Aslı Demir (TUR)	17
Marta Ojeda (ESP)	6

Semifinals
Irina Rîngaci (MDA)	10
Sophia Schäfle (GER)	0
Nigar Mirzazada (AZE)	0
Aslı Demir (TUR)	6^{F}

Final
Irina Rîngaci (MDA)	6
Aslı Demir (TUR)	0

Repechage round
Adina Irimia (ROU)	0
Noémi Szabados (HUN)	10
Karolina Kozłowska (POL)	9
Marta Ojeda (ESP)	11^{F}

Bronze medal match
Noémi Szabados (HUN)	3
Sophia Schäfle (GER)	1
Marta Ojeda (ESP)	3
Nigar Mirzazada (AZE)	6

==== Women's freestyle 72 kg ====
Main bracket

Round of 16
Marta Pajula (EST)	2
Larisa Niţu (ROU)	11

Quarterfinals
Zsuzsanna Molnár (SVK)	2
Larisa Niţu (ROU)	7^{F}
Kendra Dacher (FRA)	8
Eleni Pjollaj (ITA)	7
Wiktoria Chołuj (POL)	10
Merve Pul (TUR)	0
Lilly Schneider (GER)	0
Emese Elekes (HUN)	5

Semifinals
Larisa Niţu (ROU)	10
Kendra Dacher (FRA)	0
Wiktoria Chołuj (POL)	5
Emese Elekes (HUN)	0

Final
Larisa Niţu (ROU)	0
Wiktoria Chołuj (POL)	10

Repechage round
Marta Pajula (EST)	1
Zsuzsanna Molnár (SVK)	7

Bronze medal match
Zsuzsanna Molnár (SVK)	2^{F}
Kendra Dacher (FRA)	1
Merve Pul (TUR)	0
Emese Elekes (HUN)	4

==== Women's freestyle 76 kg ====
Main bracket

Quarterfinals		Semifinals		Final
Carla Lera (ESP)	0
Mehtap Gültekin (TUR)	7	Mehtap Gültekin (TUR)	0
Bernadett Nagy (HUN)	11	Bernadett Nagy (HUN)	11
Vanesa Kaloyanova (BUL)	0			Bernadett Nagy (HUN)	4
Kamilė Gaučaitė (LTU)	12			Kamilė Gaučaitė (LTU)	0
Lolita Oboleviča (LAT)	2	Kamilė Gaučaitė (LTU)	3
Vincenza Amendola (ITA)	4	Marion Bye (NOR)	0
Marion Bye (NOR)	7^{F}

Bronze medal match
Vanesa Kaloyanova (BUL)	1
Mehtap Gültekin (TUR)	1
Lolita Oboleviča (LAT)	4
Marion Bye (NOR)	4^{F}
