= 2025 World Wrestling Championships – Women's freestyle 55 kg =

Wrestling competitions

Women's freestyle 55 kg at the 2025 World Championships
- Venue: Arena Zagreb
- Dates: 15–16 September 2025
- Competitors: 18 from 17 nations

Medalists
gold medal	Oh Kyong-ryong	North Korea
silver medal	Ekaterina Verbina
bronze medal	Sowaka Uchida	Japan
bronze medal	Andreea Ana	Romania

The women's freestyle 55 kilograms is a competition featured at the 2025 World Wrestling Championships, and was held in Zagreb, Croatia on 15 and 16 September 2025.

This freestyle wrestling competition consists of a single-elimination tournament, with a repechage used to determine the winner of two bronze medals. The two finalists face off for gold and silver medals. Each wrestler who loses to one of the two finalists moves into the repechage, culminating in a pair of bronze medal matches, featuring the semifinal losers each facing the remaining repechage opponent from their half of the bracket.

== Results ==
Legend

- F — Won by fall

=== Final ===
Final
Oh Kyong-ryong (PRK)	10
Ekaterina Verbina (UWW)	0

=== Top half ===
Round of 32
Sowaka Uchida (JPN)	10
Batkhuyagiin Khulan (MGL)	0

Round of 16
Oleksandra Khomenets (UKR)	11
Lee Hye-rim (KOR)	0
Sowaka Uchida (JPN)	8
Nishu Bhanwala (IND)	4
Oh Kyong-ryong (PRK)	12
Mihaela Samoil (MDA)	2
Zulfiya Yakhyarova (KAZ)	2
Elvira Süleyman Kamaloğlu (TUR)	12

Quarterfinals
Oleksandra Khomenets (UKR)	5
Sowaka Uchida (JPN)	10
Oh Kyong-ryong (PRK)	14
Elvira Süleyman Kamaloğlu (TUR)	7

Semifinals
Sowaka Uchida (JPN)	0
Oh Kyong-ryong (PRK)	4^{F}

=== Bottom half ===
Round of 32
Andreea Ana (ROU)	12
Liang Xuejing (CHN)	2

Round of 16
Ekaterina Verbina (UWW)	8^{F}
Oleksandra Kogut (AUT)	0
Yaynelis Sanz (CUB)	6
Olivia Andrich (GER)	0
Cristelle Rodriguez (USA)	3
Andreea Ana (ROU)	6
Victoria Báez (ESP)	3
Karla Godinez (CAN)	6

Quarterfinals
Ekaterina Verbina (UWW)	6
Yaynelis Sanz (CUB)	4
Andreea Ana (ROU)	3
Karla Godinez (CAN)	1

Semifinals
Ekaterina Verbina (UWW)	5
Andreea Ana (ROU)	3

=== Repechage ===
Repechage round 2
Mihaela Samoil (MDA)	0
Elvira Süleyman Kamaloğlu (TUR)	8^{F}
Oleksandra Kogut (AUT)	0
Yaynelis Sanz (CUB)	6

Bronze medals
Elvira Süleyman Kamaloğlu (TUR)	0
Sowaka Uchida (JPN)	10
Yaynelis Sanz (CUB)	3
Andreea Ana (ROU)	6

== Final standing ==
Rank	Athlete
1st place, gold medalist(s)	Oh Kyong-ryong (PRK)
2nd place, silver medalist(s)	Ekaterina Verbina (UWW)
3rd place, bronze medalist(s)	Sowaka Uchida (JPN)
3rd place, bronze medalist(s)	Andreea Ana (ROU)
5	Elvira Süleyman Kamaloğlu (TUR)
5	Yaynelis Sanz (CUB)
7	Oleksandra Khomenets (UKR)
8	Karla Godinez (CAN)
9	Nishu Bhanwala (IND)
10	Cristelle Rodriguez (USA)
11	Victoria Báez (ESP)
12	Zulfiya Yakhyarova (KAZ)
13	Liang Xuejing (CHN)
14	Mihaela Samoil (MDA)
15	Olivia Andrich (GER)
16	Batkhuyagiin Khulan (MGL)
17	Lee Hye-rim (KOR)
18	Oleksandra Kogut (AUT)
