= 2024 U23 World Wrestling Championships – Women's freestyle 55 kg =

Wrestling competitions

Women's freestyle 55 kg at the 2024 U23 World Championships
- Venue: Tirana Olympic Park
- Dates: 23–24 October
- Competitors: 19 from 17 nations

Medalists
gold medal	Jonna Malmgren	Sweden
silver medal	Zeltzin Hernández	Mexico
bronze medal	Oleksandra Khomenets	Ukraine
bronze medal	Amani Jones	United States

The women's freestyle 55 is a competition featured at the 2024 U23 World Wrestling Championships, and was held in Tirana, Albania on 23 and 24 October 2024.

This freestyle wrestling competition consists of a single-elimination tournament, with a repechage used to determine the winner of two bronze medals. The two finalists face off for gold and silver medals. Each wrestler who loses to one of the two finalists moves into the repechage, culminating in a pair of bronze medal matches featuring the semifinal losers each facing the remaining repechage opponent from their half of the bracket.

== Results ==
Legend

- F — Won by fall

=== Final ===
Final
Jonna Malmgren (SWE)	10
Zeltzin Hernández (MEX)	0

=== Top half ===
Round of 32
Bayanmönkhiin Otgontuyaa (MGL)	8
Ainur Ashimova (KAZ)	2

Round of 16
Neon Gomi (JPN)	1
Oleksandra Khomenets (UKR)	3
Bayanmönkhiin Otgontuyaa (MGL)	5
Jonna Malmgren (SWE)	12
Ekaterina Karpushkina (AIN)	10
Amory Andrich (GER)	7
Elvira Süleyman Kamaloğlu (TUR)	4
Aliaksandra Bulava (AIN)	13

Quarterfinals
Oleksandra Khomenets (UKR)	3
Jonna Malmgren (SWE)	4
Ekaterina Karpushkina (AIN)	14^{F}
Aliaksandra Bulava (AIN)	8

Semifinals
Jonna Malmgren (SWE)	7
Ekaterina Karpushkina (AIN)	0

=== Bottom half ===
Round of 32
Antonia Valdés (CHI)	2
Amani Jones (USA)	9^{F}
Victoria Seal (CAN)	6
Bhavika Patel (IND)	9

Round of 16
Róza Szenttamási (HUN)	6^{F}
Mihaela Samoil (MDA)	0
Amani Jones (USA)	15^{F}
Lu Ying (CHN)	8
Zeltzin Hernández (MEX)	11
Bhavika Patel (IND)	1
Gultakin Shirinova (AZE)	5
Aruuke Kadyrbek Kyzy (KGZ)	9

Quarterfinals
Róza Szenttamási (HUN)	3
Amani Jones (USA)	9
Zeltzin Hernández (MEX)	11
Aruuke Kadyrbek Kyzy (KGZ)	0

Semifinals
Amani Jones (USA)	5
Zeltzin Hernández (MEX)	4^{F}

=== Repechage ===
Repechage round 2
Bayanmönkhiin Otgontuyaa (MGL)	3
Oleksandra Khomenets (UKR)	3
Bhavika Patel (IND)	10
Aruuke Kadyrbek Kyzy (KGZ)	0

Bronze medals
Oleksandra Khomenets (UKR)	5
Ekaterina Karpushkina (AIN)	0
Bhavika Patel (IND)	2
Amani Jones (USA)	5

== Final standing ==
Rank	Athlete
1st place, gold medalist(s)	Jonna Malmgren (SWE)
2nd place, silver medalist(s)	Zeltzin Hernández (MEX)
3rd place, bronze medalist(s)	Oleksandra Khomenets (UKR)
3rd place, bronze medalist(s)	Amani Jones (USA)
5	Ekaterina Karpushkina (AIN)
5	Bhavika Patel (IND)
7	Róza Szenttamási (HUN)
8	Bayanmönkhiin Otgontuyaa (MGL)
9	Aliaksandra Bulava (AIN)
10	Aruuke Kadyrbek Kyzy (KGZ)
11	Amory Andrich (GER)
12	Victoria Seal (CAN)
13	Gultakin Shirinova (AZE)
14	Elvira Süleyman Kamaloğlu (TUR)
15	Ainur Ashimova (KAZ)
16	Neon Gomi (JPN)
17	Lu Ying (CHN)
18	Antonia Valdés (CHI)
19	Mihaela Samoil (MDA)
