= Georgios Pilidis =

Greek wrestler

Personal information
- Born: 21 January 2000 (age 26) Athens, Greece
- Height: 1.60 m (5 ft 3 in)
- Weight: 65 kg (143 lb)

Sport
- Country: Greece
- Sport: Wrestling
Medal record
Men's Freestyle wrestling
Representing Greece
World U23 Championships
Gold medal – first place	2021 Belgrade	65 kg
European U23 Championships
Bronze medal – third place	2018 Istanbul	57 kg
Silver medal – second place	2019 Novi Sad	61 kg

Georgios Pilidis (Greek: Γεώργιος Πιλίδης, born 21 January 2000) is a Greek freestyle wrestler. He won the gold medal in the 65 kg event at the 2021 U23 World Wrestling Championships held in Belgrade, Serbia. He competed in the 65 kg event at the 2020 Summer Olympics.

== Mixed martial arts record ==
Professional record breakdown
3 matches	3 wins	0 losses
By knockout	2	0
By decision	1	0

Res.	Record	Opponent	Method	Event	Date	Round	Time	Location	Notes
Win	3–0	Konstantinos Leonidou	TKO (punches)	Quest MMA 17	June 21, 2026	1	4:00	Athens, Greece	
Win	2–0	Ricardo Monteiro	Decision (unanimous)	Quest MMA 16	April 26, 2026	3	5:00	Athens, Greece	
Win	1–0	Brandon Najera	TKO (punches)	AFN 10	June 14, 2025	1	1:34	Solna, Sweden	
