= 2025 European Wrestling Championships – Women's freestyle 55 kg =

Wrestling competition

Women's freestyle 55 kg at the 2025 European Wrestling Championships
- Venue: X-Bionic Sphere
- Location: Bratislava, Slovakia
- Dates: 9-10 April
- Competitors: 12

Medalists
gold medal	Ekaterina Verbina
silver medal	Tatiana Debien	France
bronze medal	Mariana Drăguțan	Moldova
bronze medal	Oleksandra Khomenets	Ukraine

The women's freestyle 55 kg is a competition featured at the 2025 European Wrestling Championships, and was held in Bratislava, Slovakia on April 9 and 10.

== Results ==
Legend

- F — Won by fall

=== Main bracket ===
Round of 16
Aliaksandra Bulava (UWW)	1
Róza Szenttamási (HUN)	4
Amory Andrich (GER)	2^{F}
Irena Binkova (BUL)	0
Tuba Demir (TUR)	12
Roksana Zasina (POL)	7
Beatrice Ferenţ (ROU)	3
Elnura Mammadova (AZE)	2

Quarterfinals
Tatiana Debien (FRA)	10
Róza Szenttamási (HUN)	0
Amory Andrich (GER)	2
Mariana Drăguțan (MDA)	3
Ekaterina Verbina (UWW)	13
Tuba Demir (TUR)	6
Beatrice Ferenţ (ROU)	4
Oleksandra Khomenets (UKR)	8

Semifinals
Tatiana Debien (FRA)	10
Mariana Drăguțan (MDA)	0
Ekaterina Verbina (UWW)	9
Oleksandra Khomenets (UKR)	3

Final
Tatiana Debien (FRA)	5
Ekaterina Verbina (UWW)	6

=== Repechage ===
Bronze medal match
Róza Szenttamási (HUN)	4
Mariana Drăguțan (MDA)	7
Tuba Demir (TUR)	2
Oleksandra Khomenets (UKR)	6

== Final standing ==
Rank	Athlete
1st place, gold medalist(s)	Ekaterina Verbina (UWW)
2nd place, silver medalist(s)	Tatiana Debien (FRA)
3rd place, bronze medalist(s)	Mariana Drăguțan (MDA)
3rd place, bronze medalist(s)	Oleksandra Khomenets (UKR)
5	Róza Szenttamási (HUN)
5	Tuba Demir (TUR)
7	Amory Andrich (GER)
8	Beatrice Ferenţ (ROU)
9	Roksana Zasina (POL)
10	Elnura Mammadova (AZE)
11	Aliaksandra Bulava (UWW)
12	Irena Binkova (BUL)
