= 2021 U23 World Wrestling Championships – Men's Greco-Roman 67 kg =

Greco-Roman event at World Wrestling Championship

The men's Greco-Roman 67 kilograms is a competition featured at the 2021 U23 World Wrestling Championships, and was held in Belgrade, Serbia on 2 and 3 November.

== Medalists ==
Gold	Hasrat Jafarov (AZE)
Silver	Mohammad Javad Rezaei (IRI)
Bronze	Kadir Kamal (TUR)
Bronze	Miakhdi Iakhiaev (RUS)

== Results ==
Legend

- F — Won by fall

=== Final ===
Final
Hasrat Jafarov (AZE)	3
Mohammad Javad Rezaei (IRI)	2

=== Top half ===
Round of 32
Hasrat Jafarov (AZE)	3
Diego Martínez (MEX)	1
Ivo Iliev (BUL)	1
Vasile Dosoftei (ROU)	8

Round of 16
Kadir Kamal (TUR)	9
Adomas Grigaliūnas (LTU)	0
Elmer Mattila (FIN)	9
Ahmed Barahmah (KSA)	0
Sultan Assetuly (KAZ)	5
Jacob Tangen (NOR)	3
Hasrat Jafarov (AZE)	10
Vasile Dosoftei (ROU)	1

Quarterfinals
Kadir Kamal (TUR)	5
Elmer Mattila (FIN)	1
Sultan Assetuly (KAZ)	2
Hasrat Jafarov (AZE)	9

Semifinals
Kadir Kamal (TUR)	1
Hasrat Jafarov (AZE)	4

=== Bottom half ===
Round of 32
Ignazio Sanfilippo (ITA)	0
Ashu Bazard (IND)	9
Miakhdi Iakhiaev (RUS)	7
Julián Horta (COL)	0
Nils Buschner (GER)	0
Mohammad Javad Rezaei (IRI)	8
Oleksii Masyk (UKR)	8
Samvel Aghajanyan (ARM)	0
Marlen Asikeev (KGZ)	8
Uglješa Gajić (SRB)	0
Maxim Canțer (MDA)	1
Aliaksandr Liavonchyk (BLR)	8
Alston Nutter (USA)	0
Joni Khetsuriani (GEO)	9
Abdelmalek Merabet (ALG)	0
Makhmud Bakhshilloev (UZB)	8

Round of 16
Ashu Bazard (IND)	3
Miakhdi Iakhiaev (RUS)	4
Mohammad Javad Rezaei (IRI)	8
Oleksii Masyk (UKR)	0
Marlen Asikeev (KGZ)	4^{F}
Aliaksandr Liavonchyk (BLR)	1
Joni Khetsuriani (GEO)	3
Makhmud Bakhshilloev (UZB)	3

Quarterfinals
Miakhdi Iakhiaev (RUS)	2
Mohammad Javad Rezaei (IRI)	5
Marlen Asikeev (KGZ)	1
Joni Khetsuriani (GEO)	8

Semifinals
Mohammad Javad Rezaei (IRI)	5
Joni Khetsuriani (GEO)	1

=== Repechage ===
Repechage round 1
Diego Martínez (MEX)	9
Vasile Dosoftei (ROU)	0
Nils Buschner (GER)	2
Oleksii Masyk (UKR)	10

Repechage round 2
Diego Martínez (MEX)	0
Sultan Assetuly (KAZ)	9
Oleksii Masyk (UKR)	1
Miakhdi Iakhiaev (RUS)	4

Bronze medals
Sultan Assetuly (KAZ)	1
Kadir Kamal (TUR)	5
Miakhdi Iakhiaev (RUS)	5
Joni Khetsuriani (GEO)	1
