= 2023 U23 World Wrestling Championships – Women's freestyle 53 kg =

Wrestling competitions

Women's freestyle 53 kg at the 2023 U23 World Championships
- Venue: Tirana Olympic Park
- Dates: 26–27 October
- Competitors: 15 from 12 nations

Medalists
gold medal	Mako Oono	Japan
silver medal	Mariana Drăguțan	Moldova
bronze medal	Altyn Shagayeva	Kazakhstan
bronze medal	Liliia Malanchuk	Ukraine

The women's freestyle 53 kilograms is a competition featured at the 2023 U23 World Wrestling Championships, and will held in Tirana, Albania on 26 and 27 October 2023.

This freestyle wrestling competition consists of a single-elimination tournament, with a repechage used to determine the winner of two bronze medals. The two finalists face off for gold and silver medals. Each wrestler who loses to one of the two finalists moves into the repechage, culminating in a pair of bronze medal matches featuring the semifinal losers each facing the remaining repechage opponent from their half of the bracket.

== Results ==
Legend

- F — Won by fall

=== Main Bracket ===
Round of 16
Beatrice Ferenţ (ROU)	2
Katie Gomez (USA)	1
Altyn Shagayeva (KAZ)	10
Asmar Jankurtaran (AZE)	0
Viktoryia Volk (ANA)	2
Tetiana Profatilova (FRA)	3
Tuba Demir (TUR)	2
Ekaterina Verbina (ANA)	5
Serena Di Benedetto (CAN)	11
Lobna Ichaoui (TUN)	0
Liliia Malanchuk (UKR)	8^{F}
Esmeralda Nela (ALB)	0
Mako Oono (JPN)	2^{F}
Ishika Kumar (UWW)	0

Quarterfinals
Mariana Drăguțan (MDA)	8
Beatrice Ferenţ (ROU)	2
Altyn Shagayeva (KAZ)	12
Tetiana Profatilova (FRA)	2
Ekaterina Verbina (ANA)	17
Serena Di Benedetto (CAN)	10
Liliia Malanchuk (UKR)	2
Mako Oono (JPN)	2

Semifinals
Mariana Drăguțan (MDA)	6
Altyn Shagayeva (KAZ)	2
Ekaterina Verbina (ANA)	2
Mako Oono (JPN)	6

Final
Mariana Drăguțan (MDA)	0
Mako Oono (JPN)	10

=== Repechage ===
Repechage round 1
Ishika Kumar (UWW)	0
Liliia Malanchuk (UKR)	10

Bronze medals
Beatrice Ferenţ (ROU)	1
Altyn Shagayeva (KAZ)	12
Liliia Malanchuk (UKR)	10
Ekaterina Verbina (ANA)	8
