= Kadir Kamal =

Turkish Greco-Roman wrestler

Personal information
- Full name: Kadir Kazım Kamal
- Born: 1 January 2000 (age 26) Manisa, Turkey
- Height: 170 cm (5 ft 7 in)
- Weight: 67 kg (148 lb; 10.6 st)

Sport
- Country: Turkey
- Sport: Amateur wrestling
- Weight class: 67 kg
- Event: Greco-Roman
- Club: İstanbul Büyükşehir Belediyesi S.K.
Medal record
Men's Greco-Roman wrestling
Representing Turkey
World U23 Championships
Bronze medal – third place	2021 Belgrade	67 kg
European U23 Championship
Silver medal – second place	2022 Plovdiv	67 kg
Silver medal – second place	2021 Skopje	67 kg
Dan Kolov & Nikola Petrov Tournament
Bronze medal – third place	2021 Plovdiv	67 kg
Thor Masters
Silver medal – second place	2020 Nykoebing Falster	67 kg
City of Sassari Tournament
Bronze medal – third place	2019 Sassari	63 kg

Kadir Kamal is a Turkish Greco-Roman wrestler competing in the 67 kg division. He is a member of İstanbul Büyükşehir Belediyesi S.K.

== Career ==
Kadir Kamal captured silver medal in men's Greco-Roman 67 kg at 2021 European U23 Wrestling Championship.

In November 2021, he won one of the bronze medals in that event at the 2021 U23 World Wrestling Championships held in Belgrade, Serbia.

Kadir Kamal captured the silver medal in men's Greco-Roman 67 kg at 2022 European U23 Wrestling Championships.
