= 2022 U23 World Wrestling Championships – Men's freestyle 86 kg =

Wrestling competitions

Men's freestyle 86 kg at the 2022 U23 World Championships
- Venue: Pontevedra Municipal Sports Hall
- Dates: 22–23 October
- Competitors: 24 from 24 nations

Medalists
gold medal	Tatsuya Shirai	Japan
silver medal	Trent Hidlay	United States
bronze medal	Ivan Ichizli	Moldova
bronze medal	Emre Çiftçi	Turkey

The men's freestyle 86 kg is a competition featured at the 2022 U23 World Wrestling Championships, and was held in Pontevedra, Spain on 22 and 23 October 2022. The qualification rounds were held on 22 October while medal matches were held on the 2nd day of the competition. A total of 24 wrestlers competed in this event, limited to athletes whose body weight was less than 86 kilograms.

This freestyle wrestling competition consists of a single-elimination tournament, with a repechage used to determine the winner of two bronze medals. The two finalists face off for gold and silver medals. Each wrestler who loses to one of the two finalists moves into the repechage, culminating in a pair of bronze medal matches featuring the semifinal losers each facing the remaining repechage opponent from their half of the bracket.

== Results ==
Legend

- D — Disqualified
- F — Won by fall
- WO — Won by walkover

=== Final ===
Final
Trent Hidlay (USA)	3
Tatsuya Shirai (JPN)	3

=== Top half ===
Round of 32
Sajjad Gholami (IRI)	6
Trent Hidlay (USA)	15
Maksat Satybaldy (KAZ)	12
Edward Lessing (RSA)	2
Jaime García-Zozaya (ESP)	0
Knyaz Iboyan (ARM)	10
Benjamin Greil (AUT)	12
César Ubico (GUA)	0

Round of 16
Nurtilek Karypbaev (KGZ)	0
Trent Hidlay (USA)	6
Maksat Satybaldy (KAZ)	9
Rakhim Magamadov (FRA)	7
Ivan Ichizli (MDA)	11
Knyaz Iboyan (ARM)	3
Benjamin Greil (AUT)	3
Cezary Sadowski (POL)	6^{F}

Quarterfinals
Trent Hidlay (USA)	6
Maksat Satybaldy (KAZ)	0
Ivan Ichizli (MDA)	12
Cezary Sadowski (POL)	7

Semifinals
Trent Hidlay (USA)	11
Ivan Ichizli (MDA)	1

=== Bottom half ===
Round of 32
Angelos Kouklaris (GRE)	0
Emre Çiftçi (TUR)	10
Steven Rodríguez (VEN)	0
Lars Schäfle (GER)	5
Mukhammed Aliiev (UKR)	19
Ivars Samušonoks (LAT)	9
Mattia Nasello (ITA)	11
Chengiz Soltanlı (ISR)	6

Round of 16
Tatsuya Shirai (JPN)	2
Emre Çiftçi (TUR)	1
Lars Schäfle (GER)	5
Jairo Rivera (PUR)	0
Hunter Lee (CAN)	5
Mukhammed Aliiev (UKR)	8
Mattia Nasello (ITA)	0
Evsem Shvelidze (GEO)	11

Quarterfinals
Tatsuya Shirai (JPN)	3
Lars Schäfle (GER)	1
Mukhammed Aliiev (UKR)	4
Evsem Shvelidze (GEO)	11^{F}

Semifinals
Tatsuya Shirai (JPN)	4
Evsem Shvelidze (GEO)	3

=== Repechage ===
Repechage round 1
~~Sajjad Gholami (IRI)~~	D
Nurtilek Karypbaev (KGZ)	WO

Repechage round 2
Nurtilek Karypbaev (KGZ)	2
Maksat Satybaldy (KAZ)	7
Emre Çiftçi (TUR)	10
Lars Schäfle (GER)	1

Bronze medals
Maksat Satybaldy (KAZ)	3
Ivan Ichizli (MDA)	4
Emre Çiftçi (TUR)	12
Evsem Shvelidze (GEO)	5

== Final standing ==
Rank	Athlete
1st place, gold medalist(s)	Tatsuya Shirai (JPN)
2nd place, silver medalist(s)	Trent Hidlay (USA)
3rd place, bronze medalist(s)	Ivan Ichizli (MDA)
3rd place, bronze medalist(s)	Emre Çiftçi (TUR)
5	Maksat Satybaldy (KAZ)
5	Evsem Shvelidze (GEO)
7	Lars Schäfle (GER)
8	Mukhammed Aliiev (UKR)
9	Cezary Sadowski (POL)
10	Nurtilek Karypbaev (KGZ)
11	Knyaz Iboyan (ARM)
12	Benjamin Greil (AUT)
13	Mattia Nasello (ITA)
14	Ivars Samušonoks (LAT)
15	Rakhim Magamadov (FRA)
16	Chengiz Soltanlı (ISR)
17	Hunter Lee (CAN)
18	Edward Lessing (RSA)
19	Steven Rodríguez (VEN)
20	Jairo Rivera (PUR)
21	Jaime García (ESP)
22	Angelos Kouklaris (GRE)
23	César Ubico (GUA)
DSQ	Sajjad Gholami (IRI)
