= Cavit Acar =

Turkish freestyle wrestler (born 2000)

Personal information
- Born: 2 July 2000 (age 26) Ankara, Turkey
- Height: 1.66 m (5 ft 5 in)
- Weight: 65 kg (143 lb; 10.2 st)

Sport
- Country: Turkey
- Sport: Amateur wrestling
- Event: Freestyle
- Club: Ankara ASKI
Medal record
Men's freestyle wrestling
Representing Turkey
Yasar Dogu Tournament
Silver medal – second place	2023 Istanbul	65 kg
Bronze medal – third place	2025 Kocaeli	65 kg
World U23 Championships
Bronze medal – third place	2021 Belgrade	65 kg
European U23 Championship
Bronze medal – third place	2021 Skopje	65 kg
World Cadets Championships
Bronze medal – third place	2017 Atina	58 kg

Cavit Acar (born 2 July 2000) is a Turkish freestyle wrestler competing in the 65 kg division. He is a member of Ankara ASKI.

== Career ==
In 2021, he won the bronze medal in the men's 65 kg event at the 2021 European U23 Wrestling Championship held in Skopje, North Macedonia.

He competed in the 65 kg event at the 2022 World Wrestling Championships held in Belgrade, Serbia.
