= 2021 U23 World Wrestling Championships – Women's freestyle 55 kg =

The women's freestyle 55 kilograms is a competition featured at the 2021 U23 World Wrestling Championships, and was held in Belgrade, Serbia on 3 and 4 November.

== Medalists ==
Gold	Andreea Ana; Romania
Silver	Viktoriia Vaulina; Russia
Bronze	Eda Tekin; Turkey
Bronze	Anju Anju; India

== Results ==
Legend

- F — Won by fall

=== Main bracket ===
Round of 16
Alexandra Hedrick (USA)	WO
~~Zainab Barrie (SLE)~~
Alicja Czyżowicz (POL)	0
Anju Anju (IND)	9

Quarterfinals
Andreea Ana (ROU)	10
Ainur Ashimova (KAZ)	0
Eda Tekin (TUR)	10
Elnura Mammadova (AZE)	5
Viktoriia Vaulina (RUS)	10
Virginie Kaze-Gascon (CAN)	0
Alexandra Hedrick (USA)	8
Anju Anju (IND)	11

Semifinals
Andreea Ana (ROU)	3
Eda Tekin (TUR)	1
Viktoriia Vaulina (RUS)	5
Anju Anju (IND)	4

Final
Andreea Ana (ROU)	2
Viktoriia Vaulina (RUS)	2

=== Repechage ===
Bronze medal match
Ainur Ashimova (KAZ)	5
Eda Tekin (TUR)	6
Virginie Kaze-Gascon (CAN)	6
Anju Anju (IND)	17
