= 2024 U23 World Wrestling Championships – Women's freestyle 53 kg =

Wrestling competitions

Women's freestyle 53 kg at the 2024 U23 World Championships
- Venue: Tirana Olympic Park
- Dates: 24–25 October
- Competitors: 15 from 13 nations

Medalists
gold medal	Yu Sakamoto	Japan
silver medal	Serena Di Benedetto	Canada
bronze medal	Chinboldyn Otgontuyaa	Mongolia
bronze medal	Anastasia Blayvas	Germany

The women's freestyle 53 is a competition featured at the 2024 U23 World Wrestling Championships was held in Tirana, Albania on 24 and 25 October 2024.

This freestyle wrestling competition consists of a single-elimination tournament, with a repechage used to determine the winner of two bronze medals. The two finalists face off for gold and silver medals. Each wrestler who loses to one of the two finalists moves into the repechage, culminating in a pair of bronze medal matches featuring the semifinal losers each facing the remaining repechage opponent from their half of the bracket.

== Results ==
Legend

- F — Won by fall

=== Main bracket ===
Round of 16
Yu Sakamoto (JPN)	10
Ellen Östman (SWE)	0
Yusmy Chaparro (COL)	8
Elena Ivaldi (USA)	8
Hansika Lamba (IND)	2
Chinboldyn Otgontuyaa (MGL)	12
Venera Nafikova (AIN)	0
Xie Xiaomin (CHN)	5^{F}
Liliia Malanchuk (UKR)	4^{F}
Esmeralda Nela (ALB)	0
Sıla Aykul (TUR)	0
Serena Di Benedetto (CAN)	6^{F}
Viktoryia Volk (AIN)	6
Anastasia Blayvas (GER)	9

Quarterfinals
Zeinep Bayanova (KAZ)	0
Yu Sakamoto (JPN)	10
Elena Ivaldi (USA)	8
Chinboldyn Otgontuyaa (MGL)	10
Xie Xiaomin (CHN)	8
Liliia Malanchuk (UKR)	7
Serena Di Benedetto (CAN)	13
Anastasia Blayvas (GER)	6

Semifinals
Yu Sakamoto (JPN)	4
Chinboldyn Otgontuyaa (MGL)	4
Xie Xiaomin (CHN)	5
Serena Di Benedetto (CAN)	10

Final
Yu Sakamoto (JPN)	11
Serena Di Benedetto (CAN)	0

=== Repechage ===
Repechage round 1
Ellen Östman (SWE)	1
Zeinep Bayanova (KAZ)	5
Sıla Aykul (TUR)	0
Anastasia Blayvas (GER)	11

Bronze medals
Zeinep Bayanova (KAZ)	2
Chinboldyn Otgontuyaa (MGL)	12
Anastasia Blayvas (GER)	10
Xie Xiaomin (CHN)	8

== Final standing ==
Rank	Athlete
1st place, gold medalist(s)	Yu Sakamoto (JPN)
2nd place, silver medalist(s)	Serena Di Benedetto (CAN)
3rd place, bronze medalist(s)	Chinboldyn Otgontuyaa (MGL)
3rd place, bronze medalist(s)	Anastasia Blayvas (GER)
5	Zeinep Bayanova (KAZ)
5	Xie Xiaomin (CHN)
7	Liliia Malanchuk (UKR)
8	Elena Ivaldi (USA)
9	Yusmy Chaparro (COL)
10	Viktoryia Volk (AIN)
11	Hansika Lamba (IND)
12	Ellen Östman (SWE)
13	Esmeralda Nela (ALB)
14	Venera Nafikova (AIN)
15	Sıla Aykul (TUR)
