= 2024 European Wrestling Championships – Women's freestyle 55 kg =

Wrestling competition

Women's freestyle 55 kg at the 2024 European Wrestling Championships
- Venue: Polyvalent Hall
- Location: Bucharest, Romania
- Dates: 14-15 February
- Competitors: 12

Medalists
gold medal	Andreea Ana	Romania
silver medal	Mariana Drăguțan	Moldova
bronze medal	Roksana Zasina	Poland
bronze medal	Anastasia Blayvas	Germany

The women's freestyle 55 kg is a competition featured at the 2024 European Wrestling Championships, and held in Bucharest, Romania on February 14 and 15.

== Results ==
Legend

- F — Won by fall

=== Main bracket ===
Round of 16
Róza Szenttamási (HUN)	9
Victoria Báez (ESP)	8
Aleksandra Skirenko (AIN)	4^{F}
Tetiana Profatilova (FRA)	0
Andreea Ana (ROU)	11^{F}
Sezen Belberova (BUL)	0
Tuba Demir (TUR)	5^{F}
Oleksandra Kogut (AUT)	0

Quarterfinals
Mariana Drăguțan (MDA)	2^{F}
Róza Szenttamási (HUN)	0
Aleksandra Skirenko (AIN)	3
Roksana Zasina (POL)	5
Mariia Vynnyk (UKR)	0
Andreea Ana (ROU)	9
Tuba Demir (TUR)	2
Anastasia Blayvas (GER)	6^{F}

Semifinals
Mariana Drăguțan (MDA)	6^{F}
Roksana Zasina (POL)	5
Andreea Ana (ROU)	9
Anastasia Blayvas (GER)	3

Final
Mariana Drăguțan (MDA)	0
Andreea Ana (ROU)	11

=== Repechage ===
Repechage round 1
Sezen Belberova (BUL)	0
Mariia Vynnyk (UKR)	10

Bronze medal match
Róza Szenttamási (HUN)	3
Roksana Zasina (POL)	7
Mariia Vynnyk (UKR)	11
Anastasia Blayvas (GER)	8^{F}

== Final standing ==
Rank	Athlete
1st place, gold medalist(s)	Andreea Ana (ROU)
2nd place, silver medalist(s)	Mariana Drăguțan (MDA)
3rd place, bronze medalist(s)	Roksana Zasina (POL)
3rd place, bronze medalist(s)	Anastasia Blayvas (GER)
5	Róza Szenttamási (HUN)
5	Mariia Vynnyk (UKR)
7	Aleksandra Skirenko (AIN)
8	Tuba Demir (TUR)
9	Victoria Báez-Dilone (ESP)
10	Tetiana Profatilova (FRA)
11	Oleksandra Kogut (AUT)
12	Sezen Belberova (BUL)
