= Emre Çiftçi =

Turkish freestyle wrestler

Personal information
- Nationality: Turkey
- Born: c. 2003 Erzurum, Turkey
- Height: 1.80 m (5 ft 11 in)

Sport
- Country: Turkey
- Sport: Amateur wrestling
- Weight class: 86 kg
- Event: Freestyle
- Club: Ankara ASKI
Medal record
Men's freestyle wrestling
Representing Turkey
World U23 Championships
Bronze medal – third place	2022 Pontevedra	86 kg
European U23 Championships
Bronze medal – third place	2021 Skopje	86 kg
Bronze medal – third place	2022 Plovdiv	86 kg
Bronze medal – third place	2024 Baku	86 kg
European Juniors Championships
Bronze medal – third place	2021 Dortmund	86 kg

Emre Çiftçi is a Turkish freestyle wrestler competing in the 86 kg division. He is a member of Ankara ASKI.

== Career ==
In 2021, he won the bronze medal in the men's 86 kg event at the 2021 European U23 Wrestling Championship held in Skopje, North Macedonia.
