= Bediha Gün =

Turkish freestyle wrestler

Personal information
- Nationality: Turkish
- Born: 26 October 1994 (age 31) İzmir, Turkey
- Height: 167 cm (5 ft 6 in)
- Weight: 55 kg (121 lb)

Sport
- Country: Turkey
- Sport: Women's freestyle wrestling
- Club: Ankara Aski Sport Club
Medal record
Women's freestyle wrestling
Representing Turkey
European Championships
Silver medal – second place	2025 Bratislava	59 kg
Bronze medal – third place	2018 Kaspiysk	55 kg
Bronze medal – third place	2019 Bucharest	55 kg
Bronze medal – third place	2020 Rome	55 kg
Bronze medal – third place	2022 Budapest	55 kg
Islamic Solidarity Games
Bronze medal – third place	2017 Baku	55 kg
Mediterranean Games
Gold medal – first place	2018 Tarragona	57 kg
Gold medal – first place	2022 Oran	57 kg
Yasar Dogu Tournament
Gold medal – first place	2017 Istanbul	55 kg
Gold medal – first place	2019 Istanbul	55 kg
Gold medal – first place	2025 Kocaeli	59 kg
Silver medal – second place	2012 Ankara	55 kg
Silver medal – second place	2016 Istanbul	53 kg
Silver medal – second place	2023 Istanbul	57 kg
Dan Kolov - Nikola Petrov Tournament
Gold medal – first place	2014 Sofia	55 kg
Grand Prix
Silver medal – second place	2017 Bucharest	55 kg
Silver medal – second place	2018 Klippan	55 kg
Silver medal – second place	2023 Alexandria	55 kg
World University Championships
Gold medal – first place	2016 Çorum	55 kg
European U23 Championships
Silver medal – second place	2017 Szombathely	55 kg
Bronze medal – third place	2016 Russe	55 kg
European Juniors Championships
Bronze medal – third place	2014 Dortmund	55 kg

Bediha Gün (born 26 October 1994) is a Turkish freestyle wrestler competing in the 59 kg division. She is a member of Ankara Aski Sport Club. She is a student at Kırkpınar Physical Education and Sports College of Trakya University.

== Wrestling career ==
Gün lost her chance for a medal in the quarterfinals of the 55 kg event at the 2013 World Wrestling Championships in Budapest, Hungary.

She competed in the 55 kg division at the 2015 European Games held in Baku, Azerbaijan without succeeding to advance from the quarterfinals.

She won the bronze medal at the 2016 European Wrestling Under-23 Championships in Ruse, Bulgaria. She was not able to advance from the Round of 16 in the 2016 European Wrestling Championships in Riga, Latvia.

Gün earned a quota spot at the 2016 Summer Olympics for her second-place performance at the Olympic Qualification Tournament 2 held in Istanbul, Turkey.

In March 2021, she competed at the European Qualification Tournament in Budapest, Hungary hoping to qualify for the 2020 Summer Olympics in Tokyo, Japan. In 2022, she competed in the women's 57 kg event at the Yasar Dogu Tournament held in Istanbul, Turkey. She won one of the bronze medals in the 55 kg event at the European Wrestling Championships held in Budapest, Hungary. A few months later, she won the gold medal in the 57 kg event at the 2022 Mediterranean Games held in Oran, Algeria. She competed in the 57 kg event at the 2022 World Wrestling Championships held in Belgrade, Serbia.

Bediha Gün competed in the women's freestyle 59 kg event at the 2025 European Wrestling Championships. She defeated Italy's Aurora Russo 2–1 in the round of 16, Moldova's Mariana Cherdivara 2–0 in the quarterfinals, and Azerbaijan's Alyona Kolesnik 3–0 in the semifinals to advance to the final. In the final, she was matched against Russian wrestler Anastasiia Sidelnikova, competing as a neutral athlete, and lost 4–2, earning the silver medal.
