= Hrachya Margaryan =

Armenian wrestler

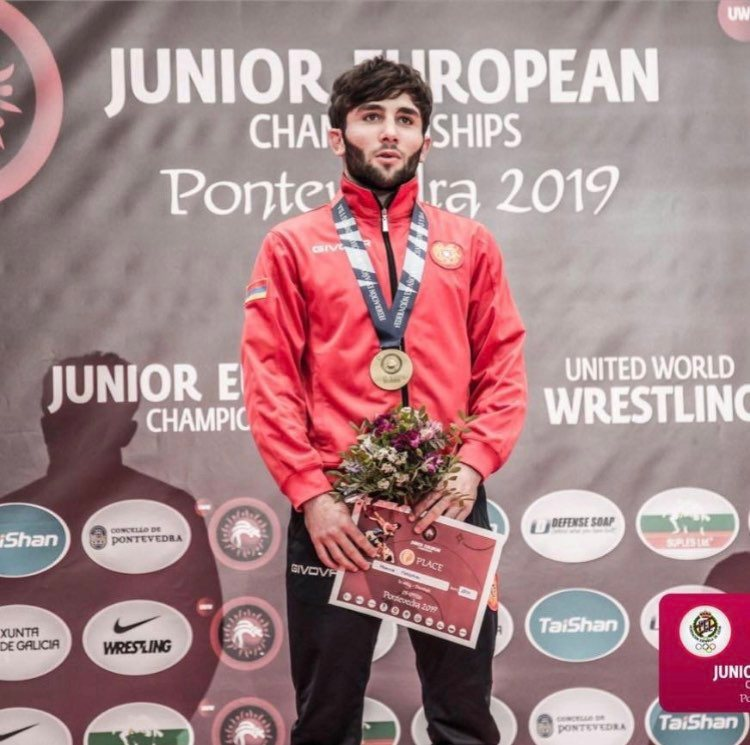

Personal information
- Native name: Հրաչյա Մարգարյան
- Nationality: Armenia
- Born: 23 November 1999 (age 26) Artashat, Armenia
- Weight: 65 kg (143 lb)

Sport
- Country: Armenia
- Sport: Wrestling
- Weight class: 65 kg
Medal record
Hrachya Margaryan
Medal record
Gold medal – first place	Pontevedra 2019	61 kg
Silver medal – second place	Plovdiv 2022	65 kg
Silver medal – second place	Democratic Republic of the Congo 2023	65 kg

Hrachya Muradi Margaryan (Armenian: Հրաչյա Մուրադի Մարգարյան, November 23, 1999), Artashat, Armenia), Armenian wrestler, member of the Armenian freestyle wrestling team European youth champion, master of sports international․

== Biography ==
Hrachya Margaryan was born on November 23, 1999. He studied at the state Institute of Physical Culture in 2017–2021. In 2019 in the 64 kilogram weight category Hrachya Margaryan became Armenias champion. He participated in the Spanish Pontevedra city which took place at the European Youth Championship. The Armenian wrestler beat the Ukrainian athlete in the final with a score of 11:0. Won a gold medal in the 61 kg weight category. On 2021-2022 he became a champion of Armenia. in 2022 Hrachya Margaryan won a silver medal at the Under-23 European Wrestling Championship held in Plovdiv, Bulgaria.

Hrachya Margaryan won a silver medal at the 2023 Francophone Games in Democratic Republic of the Congo․
