= Andreea Ana =

Romanian freestyle wrestler

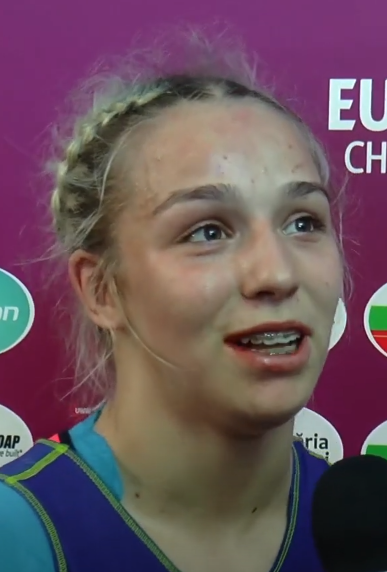
- Ana in 2019

Personal information
- Full name: Andreea Beatrice Ana
- Born: 14 November 2000 (age 26) Mangalia, Romania

Sport
- Country: Romania
- Sport: Amateur wrestling
- Weight class: 55 kg
- Event: Freestyle
Medal record
Women's freestyle wrestling
Representing Romania
World Championships
Bronze medal – third place	2025 Zagreb	55 kg
Bronze medal – third place	2026 Astana	53 kg
European Championships
Gold medal – first place	2022 Budapest	55 kg
Gold medal – first place	2023 Zagreb	55 kg
Gold medal – first place	2024 Bucharest	55 kg
Silver medal – second place	2025 Bratislava	53 kg
Bronze medal – third place	2019 Bucharest	55 kg
Bronze medal – third place	2021 Warsaw	55 kg
Yasar Dogu Tournament
Bronze medal – third place	2020 Istanbul	53 kg
Bronze medal – third place	2021 Istanbul	53 kg
Dan Kolov - Nikola Petrov Tournament
Gold medal – first place	2022 Veliko Tarnovo	55 kg
Grand Prix
Bronze medal – third place	2022 Rome	53 kg
Bronze medal – third place	2023 Alexandria	53 kg
World U23 Championships
Gold medal – first place	2021 Belgrade	55 kg
Bronze medal – third place	2018 Bucharest	53 kg
Bronze medal – third place	2019 Budapest	55 kg
European U23 Championship
Gold medal – first place	2022 Plovdiv	55 kg
Silver medal – second place	2023 Bucharest	55 kg

Andreea Beatrice Ana (born 14 November 2000) is a Romanian freestyle wrestler. She is a seven-time medalist, including four gold medals, at the European Wrestling Championships. She is the first female wrestler representing Romania to win a gold medal at the European Wrestling Championships. In 2021, Ana became under-23 world champion in the 55 kg event at the U23 World Wrestling Championships held in Belgrade, Serbia. She represented Romania at the 2020 Summer Olympics in Tokyo, Japan and the 2024 Summer Olympics in Paris, France.

== Career ==
Ana won a bronze medal at the 2018 World U23 Wrestling Championship held in Bucharest, Romania in the 53 kg event. At the 2019 European Wrestling Championships, also held in Bucharest, Romania, she won a bronze medal in the 55 kg event. In that same year, at the 2019 World U23 Wrestling Championship held in Budapest, Hungary, she also won one of the bronze medals in the 55 kg event.

In 2020, Ana competed in the women's 55 kg event at the European Wrestling Championships held in Rome, Italy without winning a medal. She was eliminated in her second match by Sofia Mattsson of Sweden. In March 2021, she competed at the European Qualification Tournament in Budapest, Hungary hoping to qualify for the 2020 Summer Olympics in Tokyo, Japan. A month later, she won one of the bronze medals in the 55 kg event at the 2021 European Wrestling Championships held in Warsaw, Poland. In May 2021, she qualified at the World Olympic Qualification Tournament to compete at the 2020 Summer Olympics. She competed in the women's 53 kg event where she was eliminated in her first match by eventual bronze medalist Vanesa Kaladzinskaya of Belarus.

At the 2021 U23 World Wrestling Championships held in Belgrade, Serbia, she won the gold medal in the 55 kg event.

In February 2022, Ana won the gold medal in the 55 kg event at the Dan Kolov & Nikola Petrov Tournament held in Veliko Tarnovo, Bulgaria. A month later, she also won the gold medal in her event at the 2022 European U23 Wrestling Championship held in Plovdiv, Bulgaria. In March 2022, she also won the gold medal in the 55 kg event at the European Wrestling Championships held in Budapest, Hungary. This is the first gold medal for Romania in women's freestyle at the European Wrestling Championships. In the final, she defeated Oleksandra Khomenets of Ukraine.

In June 2022, Ana won the bronze medal in her event at the Matteo Pellicone Ranking Series 2022 held in Rome, Italy. She competed in the 55 kg event at the 2022 World Wrestling Championships held in Belgrade, Serbia where she was eliminated in her second match by eventual bronze medalist Karla Godinez of Canada. Ana also competed in the 55 kg event at the 2022 U23 World Wrestling Championships held in Pontevedra, Spain where she was eliminated in her first match.

Ana won one of the bronze medals in the women's 53 kg event at the 2023 Ibrahim Moustafa Tournament held in Alexandria, Egypt. She won the silver medal in the women's 55 kg event at the 2023 European U23 Wrestling Championships held in Bucharest, Romania. A month later, Ana won the gold medal in the women's 55 kg event at the 2023 European Wrestling Championships held in Zagreb, Croatia. She defeated Erika Bognár of Hungary in her gold medal match.

Ana won the gold medal in the women's 55 kg event at the 2024 European Wrestling Championships held in Bucharest, Romania. In the final, she defeated Mariana Drăguțan of Moldova. She competed at the 2024 European Wrestling Olympic Qualification Tournament in Baku, Azerbaijan and she earned a quota place for Romania for the 2024 Summer Olympics in Paris, France. Ana competed in the women's 53 kg event at the Olympics. She lost her second match against Lucía Yépez of Ecuador and she was eliminated in the repechage by Choe Hyo-gyong of North Korea.

In 2025, Ana won the silver medal in the 53 kg event at the European Wrestling Championships held in Bratislava, Slovakia.

== Achievements ==
Year	Tournament	Location	Result	Event
2019	European Championships	Bucharest, Romania	3rd	Freestyle 55 kg
2021	European Championships	Warsaw, Poland	3rd	Freestyle 55 kg
2022	European Championships	Budapest, Hungary	1st	Freestyle 55 kg
2023	European Championships	Zagreb, Croatia	1st	Freestyle 55 kg
2024	European Championships	Bucharest, Romania	1st	Freestyle 55 kg
2025	European Championships	Bratislava, Slovakia	2nd	Freestyle 53 kg
2025	World Championships	Zagreb, Croatia	3rd	Freestyle 55 kg
2026	World Championships	Astana, Kazakhstan	3rd	Freestyle 53 kg
