= Eda Tekin =

Turkish freestyle wrestler

Eda Su Tekin
Personal information
- Nationality: turkish
- Born: July 7, 1999 (age 27) Antalya, Turkey
- Height: 1.55 m (5 ft 1 in)
- Weight: 55 kg (121 lb; 8.7 st)

Sport
- Country: Turkey
- Sport: Women's freestyle wrestling
- Event: 55 kg / 57 kg
- Club: Antalya GSİM
Medal record
Women's freestyle wrestling
Representing Turkey
World U23 Championships
Bronze medal – third place	2021 Belgrade	55 kg
European U23 Championship
Silver medal – second place	2019 Novi Sad	55 kg
European Juniors Championships
Bronze medal – third place	2018 Rome	55 kg

Eda Su Tekin (born July 7, 1999) is a Turkish freestyle wrestler model @edstkn and competing in the 57 kg division. She is a member of Antalya GSİM.

== Career ==
In 2018, she won the bronze medal in the women's 55 kg event at the 2018 European Juniors Wrestling Championships held in Rome, Italia.

In 2019, Eda Tekin won a silver medal in the women's 55 kg event at the 2019 European U23 Wrestling Championship in Romania.

At the 2021 U23 World Wrestling Championships held in Belgrade, Serbia, she won one of the bronze medals in the 55 kg event.
