= Anastasia Blayvas =

German freestyle wrestler

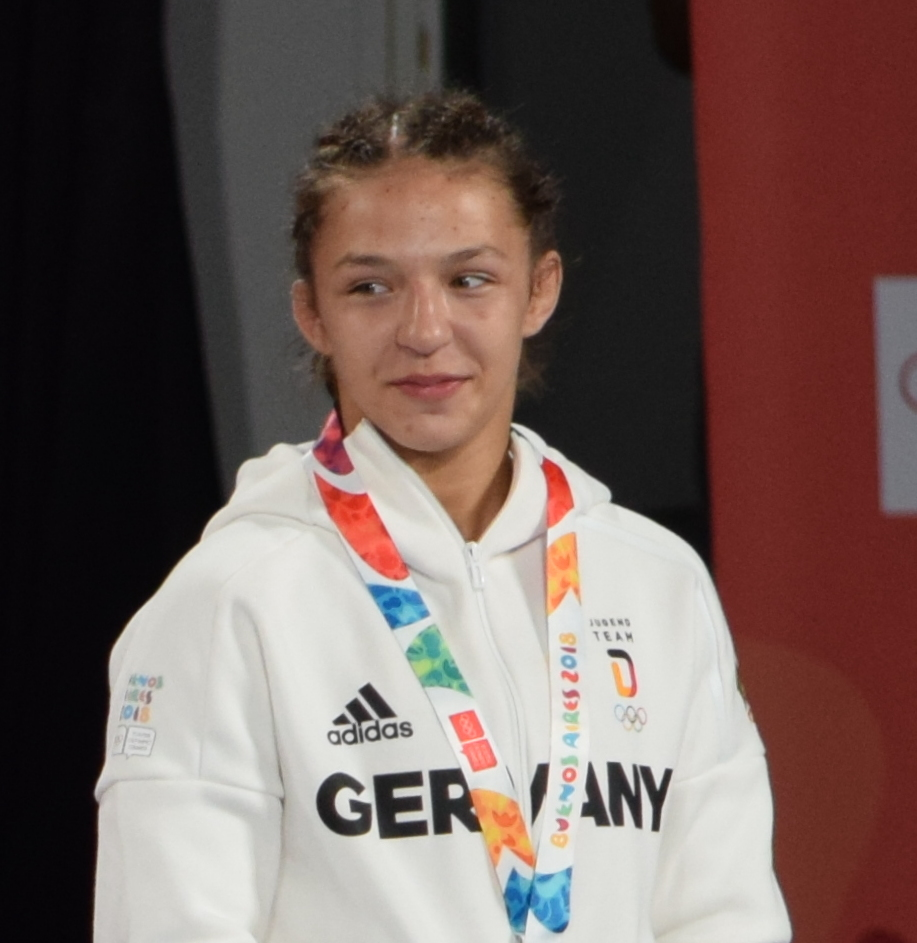

Personal information
- Born: 13 January 2001 (age 25) Halle, Germany
- Height: 1.66 m (5 ft 5 in)
- Weight: 57 kg (126 lb)

Sport
- Country: Germany
- Sport: Women's freestyle wrestling
- Event: 55 kg
- Club: KFC Leipzig
Medal record
Women's freestyle wrestling
Representing Germany
World Championships
Bronze medal – third place	2023 Belgrade	55 kg
European Championships
Bronze medal – third place	2024 Bucharest	55 kg
World Military Championships
Silver medal – second place	2025 Warendorf	65 kg
Dan Kolov - Nikola Petrov Tournament
Bronze medal – third place	2022 Veliko Tarnovo	53 kg
World U23 Championships
Bronze medal – third place	2022 Pontevedra	53 kg
Bronze medal – third place	2024 Tirana	53 kg
European U23 Championship
Silver medal – second place	2022 Plovdiv	53 kg
Bronze medal – third place	2023 Bucharest	53 kg
European Juniors Championship
Bronze medal – third place	2021 Dortmund	53 kg
Summer Youth Olympics
Bronze medal – third place	2018 Buenos Aires	57 kg

Anastasia Blayvas (born 13 January 2001) is a German freestyle wrestler who competes in the 55 kg division.

== Career ==
In 2018, Blayvas was part of the German team at the 2018 Summer Youth Olympics in Buenos Aires, where she won bronze in the 57 kg.

In 2023, Blayvas won a bronze medal in the women's freestyle 55 kg event at the 2023 World Wrestling Championships in Belgrade, Serbia. She also won one of the bronze medals in the women's 55 kg event at the 2024 European Wrestling Championships held in Bucharest, Romania. She competed at the 2024 European Wrestling Olympic Qualification Tournament in Baku, Azerbaijan hoping to qualify for the 2024 Summer Olympics in Paris, France. She did not qualify for the Olympics at this event. A month later, Bayvas competed at the 2024 World Wrestling Olympic Qualification Tournament held in Istanbul, Turkey and she earned a quota place for Germany for the Olympics.

Blayvas competed in the women's 50 kg event at the Olympics. She was eliminated in her first match by Mariya Stadnik of Azerbaijan.

Blayvas is queer.
