= Oleksandra Khomenets =

Ukrainian freestyle wrestler

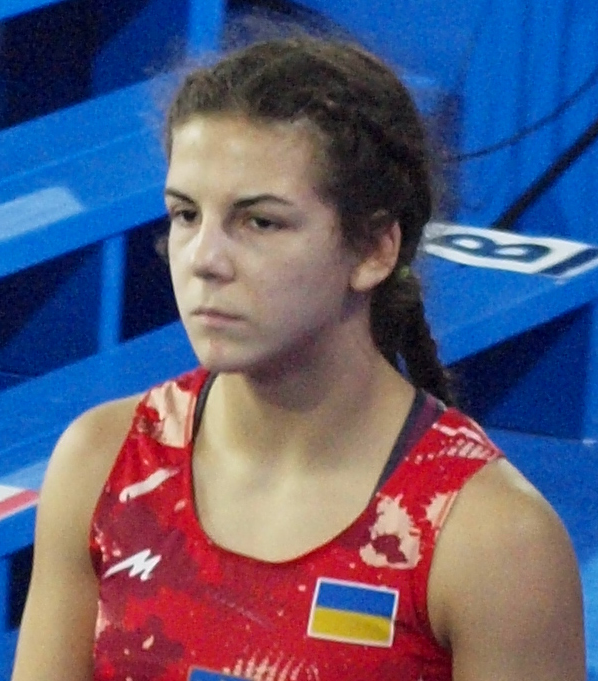
- Oleksandra Khomenets at the 2021 World Wrestling Championships in Oslo, Norway

Personal information
- Nationality: Ukrainian

Sport
- Country: Ukraine
- Sport: Amateur wrestling
- Weight class: 55 kg
- Event: Freestyle
Medal record
Women's freestyle wrestling
Representing Ukraine
World Championships
Silver medal – second place	2022 Belgrade	55 kg
Bronze medal – third place	2021 Oslo	55 kg
European Championships
Silver medal – second place	2022 Budapest	55 kg
Bronze medal – third place	2025 Bratislava	55 kg
Grand Prix
Bronze medal – third place	2025 Tirana	55 kg
World U23 Championships
Bronze medal – third place	2024 Tirana	55 kg
European U23 Championship
Silver medal – second place	2023 Bucharest	57 kg
World Juniors Championships
Bronze medal – third place	2022 Sofia	57 kg
European Juniors Championships
Gold medal – first place	2021 Dortmund	55 kg
Gold medal – first place	2022 Rome	57 kg

Oleksandra Khomenets is a Ukrainian freestyle wrestler. She is a two-time medalist in the women's 55 kg event at the World Wrestling Championships. She is also a silver medalist at the European Wrestling Championships.

== Career ==
Khomenets won one of the bronze medals in the women's 55 kg event at the 2021 World Wrestling Championships in Oslo, Norway. She defeated Olga Khoroshavtseva of the Russian Wrestling Federation in her bronze medal match.

In 2022, Khomenets won the silver medal in the women's 55 kg event at the European Wrestling Championships held in Budapest, Hungary. She won one of the bronze medals in the women's 57 kg event at the 2022 World Junior Wrestling Championships held in Sofia, Bulgaria. She won the silver medal in the 55 kg event at the 2022 World Wrestling Championships held in Belgrade, Serbia. She competed in the 55 kg event at the 2022 U23 World Wrestling Championships held in Pontevedra, Spain.

Khomenets won the silver medal in her event at the 2023 European U23 Wrestling Championships held in Bucharest, Romania.

== Achievements ==
Year	Tournament	Location	Result	Event
2021	World Championships	Oslo, Norway	3rd	Freestyle 55 kg
2022	European Championships	Budapest, Hungary	2nd	Freestyle 55 kg
2022	World Championships	Belgrade, Serbia	2nd	Freestyle 55 kg
2025	European Championships	Bratislava, Slovakia	3rd	Freestyle 55 kg
