= Mariana Drăguțan =

Moldovan freestyle wrestler

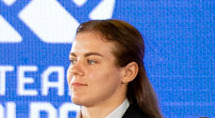
- Drăguțan in 2024

Personal information
- Born: 29 October 1999 (age 27) Strășeni, Moldova
- Height: 155 cm (5 ft 1 in)
- Weight: 55 kg (121 lb)

Sport
- Country: Moldova
- Sport: Amateur wrestling
- Weight class: 53 kg; 55 kg
- Event: Freestyle
Medal record
Women's freestyle wrestling
Representing Moldova
World Championships
| Bronze medal – third place | 2023 Belgrade | 55 kg |
European Championships
| Silver medal – second place | 2024 Bucharest | 55 kg |
| Bronze medal – third place | 2022 Budapest | 55 kg |
| Bronze medal – third place | 2025 Bratislava | 55 kg |
Grand Prix
| Silver medal – second place | 2022 Rome | 55 kg |
| Silver medal – second place | 2023 Zagreb | 55 kg |
| Bronze medal – third place | 2024 Zagreb | 55 kg |
World U23 Championships
| Silver medal – second place | 2023 Tirana | 53 kg |
European U23 Championship
| Gold medal – first place | 2022 Plovdiv | 53 kg |
| Silver medal – second place | 2023 Bucharest | 53 kg |
European Cadets Championships
| Bronze medal – third place | 2015 Subotica | 43 kg |
| Bronze medal – third place | 2017 Sarajevo | 52 kg |

Mariana Drăguțan (born 29 October 1999) is a Moldovan freestyle wrestler. She is a bronze medallist at the World Wrestling Championships and a two-time medallist at the European Wrestling Championships.

== Career ==
Drăguțan won the gold medal in the freestyle 53 kg at the 2022 European U23 Wrestling Championships in Plovdiv, Bulgaria.

She won a bronze medal in the third-place match in the women's freestyle 55 kg category at the 2022 European Wrestling Championships in Budapest, Hungary by beating her German Anastasia Blayvas 2–1 in the third-place match.

Drăguțan won the silver medal in the women's 55 kg event at the 2024 European Wrestling Championships held in Bucharest, Romania. She competed at the 2024 European Wrestling Olympic Qualification Tournament in Baku, Azerbaijan hoping to qualify for the 2024 Summer Olympics in Paris, France. Drăguțan was eliminated in her second match and she did not qualify for the Olympics. Drăguțan also competed at the 2024 World Wrestling Olympic Qualification Tournament held in Istanbul, Turkey and she earned a quota place for Moldova for the 2024 Summer Olympics. She competed in the women's 53 kg event at the Olympics. She was eliminated in her first match by Andreea Ana of Romania.
