= Erika Bognár =

Hungarian freestyle wrestler

Personal information
- Born: c. 2000 Hungary
- Height: 1.60 m (5 ft 3 in)
- Weight: 55 kg (121 lb; 8.7 st)

Sport
- Country: Hungary
- Sport: Women's freestyle wrestling
- Event: 55 kg
Medal record
Women's freestyle wrestling
Representing Hungary
European Championships
Silver medal – second place	2023 Zagreb	55 kg
Grand Prix
Gold medal – first place	2025 Budapest	59 kg
Bronze medal – third place	2023 Zagreb	55 kg
European Juniors Championships
Silver medal – second place	2019 Pontevedra	59 kg
World Cadets Championships
Bronze medal – third place	2017 Athens	60 kg
European Cadets Championships
Gold medal – first place	2017 Sarajevo	60 kg
Silver medal – second place	2016 Stockholm	52 kg

Erika Bognár is a Hungarian freestyle wrestler competing in the 55 kg division. She won a silver medal at the 2023 European Wrestling Championships held in Zagreb, Croatia.

== Career ==
In 2023, she won the silver medal in the women's freestyle 55 kg event at the European Wrestling Championships held in Zagreb, Croatia.

She competed at the 2024 European Wrestling Olympic Qualification Tournament in Baku, Azerbaijan hoping to qualify for the 2024 Summer Olympics in Paris, France. She was eliminated in her second match and she did not qualify for the Olympics.

== Achievements ==
Year	Tournament	Location	Result	Event
2023	European Championships	Zagreb, Croatia	2nd	Freestyle 55 kg
