= 2022 Grand Prix Zagreb Open =

- Host city: Zagreb, Croatia
- Dates: 29–30 January 2022
- Stadium: Dom Sportova

Champions
- Greco-Roman: Turkey

The 2022 Grand Prix Zagreb Open, was a United World Wrestling amateur wrestling event held in Zagreb, Croatia on 29 and 30 January 2022. The event held competitions in various styles, including its staples, Greco-Roman and freestyle wrestling.

== Event videos ==
The event was aired freely on the Zagreb Wrestling Association YouTube channel.

Qualification and elimination rounds
29 January 2022 Mat A	29 January 2022 Mat B	29 January 2022 Mat C	29 January 2022 Schedule
Repechage bouts and bronze medal matches
30 January 2022 Mat A	30 January 2022 Mat B	30 January 2022 Mat C	30 January 2022 Schedule

Final matches
30 January 2022 Final

⇒ 29 January Saturday, 10.30 – 19.00 qualification and elimination rounds, all weight categories (on 3 wrestling mats)

⇒ 30 January Sunday, 10.30 – 14.00 Repechage bouts and bronze medal matches (all categories), 18.00 - 20.00 Opening ceremony and Final matches (all categories)

== Medal table ==
Rank	Nation	Gold	Silver	Bronze	Total
1	Turkey	3	3	6	12
2	Ukraine	3	2	2	7
3	Belarus	1	1	2	4
3	Norway	1	1	2	4
5	Romania	1	0	1	2
6	Moldova	1	0	0	1
7	Croatia	0	1	1	2
7	Sweden	0	1	1	2
9	Denmark	0	1	0	1
10	Finland	0	0	1	1
10	France	0	0	1	1
10	Latvia	0	0	1	1
10	Switzerland	0	0	1	1
Totals (13 entries)		10	10	19	39

=== Team ranking ===
Rank	Men's Greco-Roman	
Rank	Team	Points
1	Turkey	180
2	Ukraine	129
3	Norway	77
4	Romania	70
5	Sweden	69
6	Belarus	60
7	Croatia	47
8	Finland	27
9	United States	26
10	Moldova	25

== Medal overview ==
=== Greco-Roman ===
Event	Gold	Silver	Bronze
55 kg	Denis Mihai; Romania	Koriun Sahradian; Ukraine	Emre Mutlu; Turkey
60 kg	Vitalie Eriomenco; Moldova	Viktor Petryk; Ukraine	Ayhan Karakuş; Turkey
60 kg	Vitalie Eriomenco; Moldova	Viktor Petryk; Ukraine	Dmytro Tsymbaliuk; Ukraine
63 kg	Ahmet Uyar; Turkey	Mustafa Safa Yıldırım; Turkey	Ivan Lazitovic; Croatia
63 kg	Ahmet Uyar; Turkey	Mustafa Safa Yıldırım; Turkey	Aleksandrs Jurkjans; Latvia
67 kg	Murat Fırat; Turkey	Morten Thoresen; Norway	Gagik Snjoyan; France
67 kg	Murat Fırat; Turkey	Morten Thoresen; Norway	Andreas Vetsch; Switzerland
72 kg	Parviz Nasibov; Ukraine	Abdullah Toprak; Turkey	Cengiz Arslan; Turkey
72 kg	Parviz Nasibov; Ukraine	Abdullah Toprak; Turkey	Andrii Kulyk; Ukraine
77 kg	Volodymyr Yakovliev; Ukraine	Albin Olofsson; Sweden	Pavel Liakh; Belarus
77 kg	Volodymyr Yakovliev; Ukraine	Albin Olofsson; Sweden	Tsimur Berdyiev; Belarus
82 kg	Yaroslav Filchakov; Ukraine	Filip Šačić; Croatia	Burhan Akbudak; Turkey
82 kg	Yaroslav Filchakov; Ukraine	Filip Šačić; Croatia	Exauce Mukubu; Norway
87 kg	Radzik Kuliyeu; Belarus	Turpal Bisultanov; Denmark	Muhittin Sarıçiçek; Turkey
87 kg	Radzik Kuliyeu; Belarus	Turpal Bisultanov; Denmark	Nicu Ojog; Romania
97 kg	Felix Baldauf; Norway	Mikalai Stadub; Belarus	Mustafa Olgun; Turkey
97 kg	Felix Baldauf; Norway	Mikalai Stadub; Belarus	Aleksandar Stjepanetic; Sweden
130 kg	Osman Yıldırım; Turkey	Fatih Bozkurt; Turkey	Konsta Mäenpää; Finland
130 kg	Osman Yıldırım; Turkey	Fatih Bozkurt; Turkey	Oskar Marvik; Norway

== Results ==
=== Men's Greco-Roman 55 kg ===
Pos	Athlete	Pld	W	L	CP	TP	ROU	UKR	TUR
1	Denis Mihai (ROU)	2	2	0	7	21	—	11–6	10–2
2	Koriun Sahradian (UKR)	2	1	1	4	10	1–3 PO1	—	4–0
3	Emre Mutlu (TUR)	2	0	2	1	2	1–4 SU1	0–3 PO	—

Source: UWW

=== Men's Greco-Roman 60 kg ===
Legend

- F — Won by fall
- WO — Won by walkover

1/8 finals
Viktor Petryk (UKR)	9
Sebastian Kolompar (SRB)	0
Abere Fetene (ISR)	4
Michał Tracz (POL)	13
Hleb Makaranka (BLR)	2
Ayhan Karakuş (TUR)	3
Dimitar Sandov (SUI)	9
Diego Romero (USA)	0
Vitalie Eriomenco (MDA)	10
Mükremin Aktaş (TUR)	5
~~Maksim Kazharski (BLR)~~
Zhora Abovian (UKR)	WO
Daniel Bobillo (ESP)	1
Dmytro Tsymbaliuk (UKR)	2

Quarterfinals
Randon Miranda (USA)	0
Viktor Petryk (UKR)	9
Michał Tracz (POL)	2
Ayhan Karakuş (TUR)	5
Dimitar Sandov (SUI)	7
Vitalie Eriomenco (MDA)	9
Zhora Abovian (UKR)	5
Dmytro Tsymbaliuk (UKR)	5

Semifinals
Viktor Petryk (UKR)	4^{F}
Ayhan Karakuş (TUR)	0
Vitalie Eriomenco (MDA)	9
Dmytro Tsymbaliuk (UKR)	7

Final
Viktor Petryk (UKR)
Vitalie Eriomenco (MDA)	WO

Repechage round 1
Sebastian Kolompar (SRB)	4
Randon Miranda (USA)	7
Mükremin Aktaş (TUR)	9
Dimitar Sandov (SUI)	0

Bronze medal match
Randon Miranda (USA)	2
Ayhan Karakuş (TUR)	7
Mükremin Aktaş (TUR)	3
Dmytro Tsymbaliuk (UKR)	4

=== Men's Greco-Roman 63 kg ===
Legend

- F — Won by fall

1/8 finals
Domagoj Celiček (CRO)	0
Mustafa Safa Yıldırım (TUR)	8^{F}
Oleksandr Hrushyn (UKR)	6
Răzvan Arnăut (ROU)	7
Ivan Lizatović (CRO)	WO
~~Krisztián Kecskeméti (HUN)~~
Justas Petravičius (LTU)	1
Hevorh Arzumanian (UKR)	13
Aleksandrs Jurkjans (LAT)	5
Corneliu Rusu (MDA)	1
Jonas Urs Müller (SUI)	0
Alexander Bica (SWE)	9
Ahmet Uyar (TUR)	9
Ramazan Can Aktaş (TUR)	0

Quarterfinals
Andy Juan (ESP)	0
Mustafa Safa Yıldırım (TUR)	9
Răzvan Arnăut (ROU)	7
Ivan Lizatović (CRO)	7
Hevorh Arzumanian (UKR)	3
Aleksandrs Jurkjans (LAT)	9
Alexander Bica (SWE)	0
Ahmet Uyar (TUR)	9

Semifinals
Mustafa Safa Yıldırım (TUR)	5'
Ivan Lizatović (CRO)	2
Aleksandrs Jurkjans (LAT)	1
Ahmet Uyar (TUR)	3

Final
Mustafa Safa Yıldırım (TUR)	3
Ahmet Uyar (TUR)	5

Repechage round 1
Domagoj Celiček (CRO)	8
Andy Juan (ESP)	0
Ramazan Can Aktaş (TUR)	12
Alexander Bica (SWE)	12

Bronze medal match
Domagoj Celiček (CRO)	0
Mustafa Safa Yıldırım (TUR)	8
Ramazan Can Aktaş (TUR)	0
Aleksandrs Jurkjans (LAT)	8

=== Men's Greco-Roman 67 kg ===
Legend

- WO — Won by walkover

Final
Morten Thoresen (NOR)	1
Murat Fırat (TUR)	4

Round of 32

Round of 16
Kadir Kamal (TUR)	7
Shon Nadorgin (ISR)	2
Robert Perez (USA)	0
Morten Thoresen (NOR)	6
Stefan Clément (FRA)	6
Alexei Hahlovschi (MDA)	1
Gagik Snjoyan (FRA)	9
Konstantinas Kešanidi (LTU)	1

Quarterfinals
Kadir Kamal (TUR)
Morten Thoresen (NOR)	WO
Stefan Clément (FRA)	3
Gagik Snjoyan (FRA)	4

Semifinals
Morten Thoresen (NOR)	5
Gagik Snjoyan (FRA)	0

Round of 32
Mihai Mihuț (ROU)	7
Niklas Öhlén (SWE)	5

Round of 16
Igor Gavrilović (SRB)	WO
~~István Váncza (HUN)~~
Roman Pacurkowski (POL)	3
Andreas Vetsch (SUI)	3
Ádám Pohilec (HUN)	0
Murat Fırat (TUR)	11
Pedro Caldas (POR)	0
Mihai Mihuț (ROU)	11

Quarterfinals
Igor Gavrilović (SRB)	1
Andreas Vetsch (SUI)	9
Murat Fırat (TUR)	5
Mihai Mihuț (ROU)	1

Semifinals
Andreas Vetsch (SUI)	0
Murat Fırat (TUR)	6

Repechage round 2
Robert Perez (USA)	WO
Kadir Kamal (TUR)
Ádám Pohilec (HUN)	0
Mihai Mihuț (ROU)	9

Bronze medal match
Robert Perez (USA)	3
Gagik Snjoyan (FRA)	3
Mihai Mihuț (ROU)
Andreas Vetsch (SUI)	WO

=== Men's Greco-Roman 72 kg ===
Legend

- F — Won by fall
- WO — Won by walkover

Final
Parviz Nasibov (UKR)	2
Abdullah Toprak (TUR)	1

Round of 32
Igor Botez (ROU)	0
Parviz Nasibov (UKR)	9
Aliaksandr Liavonchyk (BLR)	1
Gevorg Sahakyan (POL)	4
Cengiz Arslan (TUR)	3
Olivér Kajtán (HUN)	2

Round of 16
Oliver Oláh (SVK)	0
Róbert Fritsch (HUN)	8
Michael Portmann (SUI)	8
Miru Olsson (SWE)	3
Erik Persson (SWE)	1
Parviz Nasibov (UKR)	6
Gevorg Sahakyan (POL)	5
Cengiz Arslan (TUR)	6

Quarterfinals
Róbert Fritsch (HUN)	4
Michael Portmann (SUI)	0
Parviz Nasibov (UKR)	5
Cengiz Arslan (TUR)	4

Semifinals
Róbert Fritsch (HUN)	1
Parviz Nasibov (UKR)	1

Round of 32
Sebastian Aak (NOR)	WO
~~Håvard Jørgensen (NOR)~~
Marcos Sánchez-Silva (ESP)	0
Andrii Kulyk (UKR)	9^{F}
Vilius Savickas (LTU)	0
Pavel Puklavec (CRO)	5
Attila Tösmagi (HUN)	8
Júnior Benítez (ESP)	0
Christoffer Dahlén (SWE)	1
Mikko Peltokangas (FIN)	6
Abdullah Toprak (TUR)	8
Aleksa Erski (SRB)	0
Stefan Steigl (AUT)	1
Eimantas Vilimas (LTU)	6
Kristupas Šleiva (LTU)	4
Mateusz Bernatek (POL)	1

Round of 16
Sebastian Aak (NOR)	2
Andrii Kulyk (UKR)	10
Pavel Puklavec (CRO)	0
Attila Tösmagi (HUN)	9
Mikko Peltokangas (FIN)	0
Abdullah Toprak (TUR)	8
Eimantas Vilimas (LTU)	0
Kristupas Šleiva (LTU)	8

Quarterfinals
Andrii Kulyk (UKR)	5
Attila Tösmagi (HUN)	3
Abdullah Toprak (TUR)	12
Kristupas Šleiva (LTU)	4

Semifinals
Andrii Kulyk (UKR)	3
Abdullah Toprak (TUR)	4

Repechage round 1
Igor Botez (ROU)	1
Erik Persson (SWE)	6^{F}
Aleksa Erski (SRB)	0
Mikko Peltokangas (FIN)	8

Repechage round 2
Erik Persson (SWE)	0
Cengiz Arslan (TUR)	8
Mikko Peltokangas (FIN)	WO
Kristupas Šleiva (LTU)

Bronze medals
Cengiz Arslan (TUR)	2
Róbert Fritsch (HUN)	2
Mikko Peltokangas (FIN)	0
Andrii Kulyk (UKR)	2^{F}

=== Men's Greco-Roman 77 kg ===
Legend

- F — Won by fall
- WO — Won by walkover

Final
Volodymyr Yakovliev (UKR)	8
Albin Olofsson (SWE)	1

Round of 32

Round of 16
Yasaf Zeinalov (UKR)	8
Denis Horváth (SVK)	0
Pavel Liakh (BLR)	9
Leoš Drmola (SVK)	0
Volodymyr Yakovliev (UKR)	6
Kazbek Kilou (BLR)	1
Akseli Yli-Hannuksela (FIN)	1
Matias Lipasti (FIN)	1

Quarterfinals
Yasaf Zeinalov (UKR)	2
Pavel Liakh (BLR)	3
Volodymyr Yakovliev (UKR)	8
Matias Lipasti (FIN)	3

Semifinals
Pavel Liakh (BLR)	3
Volodymyr Yakovliev (UKR)	4

Round of 32
Ilie Cojocari (ROU)	7
Patryk Bednarz (POL)	0
Burke Paddock (USA)	0
RaVaughn Perkins (USA)	8
Tsimur Berdyieu (BLR)	4
Artur Politaiev (UKR)	0
Luka Malobabić (CRO)	2
Mantas Sinkevičius (LTU)	6
Aleksa Ilić (SRB)	0
Yunus Emre Başar (TUR)	2
Per-Anders Kure (NOR)	3
Albin Olofsson (SWE)	7^{F}
Iwan Nylypiuk (POL)	3
Abdurrahman Kalkan (TUR)	4

Round of 16
Branko Kovačević (SRB)	3
Ilie Cojocari (ROU)	4
RaVaughn Perkins (USA)	0
Tsimur Berdyieu (BLR)	9
Mantas Sinkevičius (LTU)	0
Yunus Emre Başar (TUR)	9
Albin Olofsson (SWE)	10
Abdurrahman Kalkan (TUR)	1

Quarterfinals
Ilie Cojocari (ROU)	0
Tsimur Berdyieu (BLR)	10
Yunus Emre Başar (TUR)	3
Albin Olofsson (SWE)	3

Semifinals
Tsimur Berdyieu (BLR)	6
Albin Olofsson (SWE)	14^{F}

Repechage round 1
Per-Anders Kure (NOR)
Abdurrahman Kalkan (TUR)	WO

Repechage round 2
Kazbek Kilou (BLR)	7
Matias Lipasti (FIN)	1
Abdurrahman Kalkan (TUR)	WO
Yunus Emre Başar (TUR)

Bronze medals
Kazbek Kilou (BLR)	0
Pavel Liakh (BLR)	5
Abdurrahman Kalkan (TUR)	3
Tsimur Berdyieu (BLR)	7

=== Men's Greco-Roman 82 kg ===
1/8 finals
Karlo Kodrić (CRO)	4
Móric Kismóni (HUN)	1
Vasile Cojoc (ROU)	0
Exauce Mukubu (NOR)	7
Alexander Johansson (SWE)	8
Marc Weber (SUI)	6
Filip Šačić (CRO)	9
Samet Yaldıran (TUR)	0

Quarterfinals
Yaroslav Filchakov (UKR)	9
Anton Olsson (SWE)	0
Burhan Akbudak (TUR)	9
Jonni Sarkkinen (FIN)	0
Karlo Kodrić (CRO)	4
Exauce Mukubu (NOR)	7
Alexander Johansson (SWE)	1
Filip Šačić (CRO)	9

Semifinals
Yaroslav Filchakov (UKR)	6
Burhan Akbudak (TUR)	1
Exauce Mukubu (NOR)	3
Filip Šačić (CRO)	3

Final
Yaroslav Filchakov (UKR)	3
Filip Šačić (CRO)	1

Repechage round 1
Samet Yaldıran (TUR)	4
Alexander Johansson (SWE)	5

Bronze medal match
Anton Olsson (SWE)	0
Burhan Akbudak (TUR)	11
Alexander Johansson (SWE)	0
Exauce Mukubu (NOR)	7

=== Men's Greco-Roman 87 kg ===
Legend

- F — Won by fall

Final
Radzik Kuliyeu (BLR)	1
Turpal Bisultanov (DEN)	1

Round of 32

Round of 16
Vjekoslav Luburić (CRO)	1
Filip Smetko (CRO)	4
Radzik Kuliyeu (BLR)	8
Ruben Been (NOR)	0
Dávid Losonczi (HUN)	7
Muhittin Sarıçiçek (TUR)	9
Szymon Szymonowicz (POL)	4
Arkadiusz Kułynycz (POL)	3

Quarterfinals
Filip Smetko (CRO)	1
Radzik Kuliyeu (BLR)	3
Muhittin Sarıçiçek (TUR)	8
Szymon Szymonowicz (POL)	2

Semifinals
Radzik Kuliyeu (BLR)	6
Muhittin Sarıçiçek (TUR)	1

Round of 32
Ihar Yarashevich (BLR)	11
Damian von Euw (SUI)	2
Zakarias Berg (SWE)	6^{F}
Žarko Dickov (SRB)	2
Kristian Lukač (CRO)	1
Turpal Bisultanov (DEN)	10
Arminas Lygnugaris (LTU)	0
Alex Bjurberg Kessidis (SWE)	10
Erik Szilvássy (HUN)	9
Mario Vuković (SRB)	1

Round of 16
Algot Källman (SWE)	2
Nicu Ojog (ROU)	6
Ivan Huklek (CRO)	10
Ihar Yarashevich (BLR)	6
Zakarias Berg (SWE)	0
Turpal Bisultanov (DEN)	7
Alex Bjurberg Kessidis (SWE)	3
Erik Szilvássy (HUN)	1

Quarterfinals
Nicu Ojog (ROU)	6
Ivan Huklek (CRO)	6
Turpal Bisultanov (DEN)	3
Alex Bjurberg Kessidis (SWE)	0

Semifinals
Nicu Ojog (ROU)	2
Turpal Bisultanov (DEN)	5

Repechage round 1
Kristian Lukač (CRO)	1
Zakarias Berg (SWE)	3

Repechage round 2
Ruben Been (NOR)	0
Filip Smetko (CRO)	7
Zakarias Berg (SWE)	10
Alex Bjurberg Kessidis (SWE)	4

Bronze medals
Filip Smetko (CRO)	1
Muhittin Sarıçiçek (TUR)	10
Zakarias Berg (SWE)	0
Nicu Ojog (ROU)	6^{F}

=== Men's Greco-Roman 97 kg ===
Legend

- F — Won by fall

Final
Felix Baldauf (NOR)	4
Mikalai Stadub (BLR)	0

Round of 32

Round of 16
Marcus Worren (NOR)	1
Mustafa Olgun (TUR)	9
Mindaugas Venckaitis (LTU)	1
Arnoldas Baranovas (LTU)	1
Felix Baldauf (NOR)	6^{F}
Ionuţ Goşa (ROU)	0
Martynas Nemsevičius (LTU)	9
Aleksandar Simović (SRB)	1

Quarterfinals
Mustafa Olgun (TUR)	10
Arnoldas Baranovas (LTU)	1
Felix Baldauf (NOR)	9
Martynas Nemsevičius (LTU)	6

Semifinals
Mustafa Olgun (TUR)	0
Felix Baldauf (NOR)	2

Round of 32
Yevhenii Saveta (UKR)	6
Uladzislau Pustashylau (BLR)	0

Round of 16
Mikalai Stadub (BLR)	4^{F}
Loïc Samen (FRA)	0
Beytullah Kayışdağ (TUR)	4
Aleksandar Stjepanetic (SWE)	7
Daniel Gastl (AUT)	9
Vinko Prodanović (CRO)	0
Vilius Laurinaitis (LTU)	0
Yevhenii Saveta (UKR)	5

Quarterfinals
Mikalai Stadub (BLR)	3
Aleksandar Stjepanetic (SWE)	1
Daniel Gastl (AUT)	5
Yevhenii Saveta (UKR)	1

Semifinals
Mikalai Stadub (BLR)	7
Daniel Gastl (AUT)	3

Repechage round 2
Ionuţ Goşa (ROU)	1
Martynas Nemsevičius (LTU)	5
Loïc Samen (FRA)	0
Aleksandar Stjepanetic (SWE)	6^{F}

Bronze medal match
Martynas Nemsevičius (LTU)	3
Mustafa Olgun (TUR)	4
Aleksandar Stjepanetic (SWE)	3
Daniel Gastl (AUT)	2

=== Men's Greco-Roman 130 kg ===
Legend

- C — Won by 3 cautions given to the opponent
- F — Won by fall
- WO — Won by walkover

1/8 finals
Fatih Bozkurt (TUR)	7^{F}
Tanner Farmer (USA)	2
Lenard Berei (ROU)	5
Marko Koščević (CRO)	3
Romas Fridrikas (LTU)	0
Oskar Marvik (NOR)	8
Osman Yıldırım (TUR)	8
Delian Alishahi (SUI)	0
Alin Alexuc-Ciurariu (ROU)	2
Cohlton Schultz (USA)	1

Quarterfinals
Konsta Mäenpää (FIN)	5
Rafał Krajewski (POL)	3
Franz Richter (GER)	1
Fatih Bozkurt (TUR)	5
Lenard Berei (ROU)	0
Oskar Marvik (NOR)	9
Osman Yıldırım (TUR)	3
Alin Alexuc-Ciurariu (ROU)	1

Semifinals
Konsta Mäenpää (FIN)	3
Fatih Bozkurt (TUR)	7^{F}
Oskar Marvik (NOR)	1
Osman Yıldırım (TUR)	2

Final
Fatih Bozkurt (TUR)
Osman Yıldırım (TUR)	WO

Repechage round 1
Tanner Farmer (USA)	5
Franz Richter (GER)	6
Delian Alishahi (SUI)	1
Alin Alexuc-Ciurariu (ROU)	3

Bronze medal match
Franz Richter (GER)	1
Konsta Mäenpää (FIN)	1
Alin Alexuc-Ciurariu (ROU)	0
Oskar Marvik (NOR)	9^{C}

== Participating nations ==
163 competitors from 24 nations participated.

- Austria (2)
- Belarus (10)
- Croatia (12)
- Denmark (2)
- Spain (4)
- Finland (5)
- France (3)
- Germany (1)
- Hungary (9)
- Israel (2)
- Latvia (1)
- Lithuania (12)
- Moldova (3)
- Norway (9)
- Poland (9)
- Portugal (1)
- Romania (10)
- Serbia (8)
- Switzerland (7)
- Slovakia (3)
- Sweden (12)
- Turkey (19)
- Ukraine (13)
- United States (7)
