= 2023 Vehbi Emre & Hamit Kaplan Tournament =

Vehbi Emre & Hamit Kaplan 2023
- Host city: Istanbul, Turkey
- Dates: 21–22 June
- Stadium: Başakşehir Youth and Sports Facility

Champions
- Greco-Roman: Turkey

The 40th Vehbi Emre & Hamit Kaplan Tournament 2023 was a wrestling event held in Istanbul, Turkey, from 21 to 22 June 2023 together with the 2023 Yasar Dogu Tournament.

This international tournament includes competition men's Greco-Roman wrestling. This ranking tournament was held in honor of the Olympic Champion, Hamit Kaplan and Turkish Wrestler and manager Vehbi Emre.

== Competition schedule ==
All times are (UTC+3)

Date	Time	Event
21 June	11.00-14.30	Qualification rounds & repechage GR – 55-63-72-82-97 kg
21 June	17.30-19.30	Final matches and awarding ceremony: GR – 55-63-72-82-97 kg
22 June	11.00-14.30	Qualification rounds & repechage GR – 60-67-77-87-130 kg
22 June	17.30-19.30	Final matches and awarding ceremony: Finals GR – 60-67-77-87-130 kg
23 June	11.00-14.30	Qualification rounds & repechage FS – 57-65-70-86 kg & WW – 50–55-59-62 kg
23 June	17.30-19.30	Final matches and awarding ceremony: Finals FS – 57-65-70-86 kg & WW – 50–55-59-62 kg
24 June	11.00-14.30	Qualification rounds & repechage FS – 74-79-92 kg & WW – 57–65-72 kg
24 June	17.30-19.30	Final matches and awarding ceremony: Finals FS – 74-79-92 kg & WW – 57–65-72 kg
25 June	11.00-14.30	Qualification rounds & repechage FS – 61-97-125 kg & WW – 53–68-76 kg
25 June	17.30-19.30	Final matches and awarding ceremony: Finals FS – 61-97-125 kg & WW – 53–68-76 kg

== Medal table ==
* Host nation (Turkey)

Rank	Nation	Gold	Silver	Bronze	Total
1	Turkey*	7	3	9	19
2	Hungary	2	1	2	5
3	Iran	1	4	4	9
4	Azerbaijan	0	2	1	3
5	Kyrgyzstan	0	0	1	1
Totals (5 entries)		10	10	17	37

== Team ranking ==
Rank	Men's Greco-Roman	
Rank	Team	Points
1	Turkey	220
2	Iran	169
3	Hungary	111
4	Azerbaijan	85
5	Kyrgyzstan	15

== Medal overview ==
=== Men's Greco-Roman ===
Event	Gold	Silver	Bronze
55 kg	Şerif Kılıç; Turkey	Mohammad Mahdi Farid; Iran	Şervan Çınar; Turkey
60 kg	Kerem Kamal; Turkey	Meisam Dalkhani; Iran	Kazım Tikence; Turkey
60 kg	Kerem Kamal; Turkey	Meisam Dalkhani; Iran	Mert İlbars; Turkey
63 kg	Enes Başar; Turkey	Mehmet Çeker; Turkey	Amir Mohammadzei; Iran
63 kg	Enes Başar; Turkey	Mehmet Çeker; Turkey	Kaly Sulaimanov; Kyrgyzstan
67 kg	Saeid Esmaeili; Iran	Mustafa Safa Yıldırım; Turkey	Murat Fırat; Turkey
67 kg	Saeid Esmaeili; Iran	Mustafa Safa Yıldırım; Turkey	Furkan Yıldız; Turkey
72 kg	Róbert Fritsch; Hungary	Sajjad Imentalab; Iran	Murat Dağ; Turkey
72 kg	Róbert Fritsch; Hungary	Sajjad Imentalab; Iran	Abdullah Toprak; Turkey
77 kg	Cengiz Arslan; Turkey	Gurban Gurbanov; Azerbaijan	Amin Kavianinejad; Iran
77 kg	Cengiz Arslan; Turkey	Gurban Gurbanov; Azerbaijan	Abdurahman Kalkan; Turkey
82 kg	Hasan Berk Kılınç; Turkey	Jamal Esmaili; Iran	Erik Szilvássy; Hungary
87 kg	Dávid Losonczi; Hungary	István Takács; Hungary	Mahammad Ahmadiyev; Azerbaijan
87 kg	Dávid Losonczi; Hungary	István Takács; Hungary	Pejman Poshtam; Iran
97 kg	Metehan Başar; Turkey	Murad Ahmadiyev; Azerbaijan	Beytullah Kayışdağ; Turkey
97 kg	Metehan Başar; Turkey	Murad Ahmadiyev; Azerbaijan	Tamás Lévai; Hungary
130 kg	Osman Yıldırım; Turkey	Fatih Bozkurt; Turkey	Morteza Alghosi; Iran

== Participating nations ==
89 competitors from 7 nations participated.

1. Azerbaijan (7)
2. Greece (1)
3. Hungary (13)
4. Iran (12)
5. Kazakhstan (2)
6. Kyrgyzstan (1)
7. Turkey (53)

== Results ==
Legend

- F — Won by fall
- R — Retired
- WO — Won by walkover

=== Men's Greco-Roman 55 kg ===
21 June

Pos	Athlete	Pld	W	L	CP	TP	TUR	IRI	TUR	TUR	TUR
1	Şerif Kılıç (TUR)	4	4	0	15	31	—	6–4	9–0	8–0	8–0
2	Mohammad Mahdi Farid (IRI)	4	3	1	12	34	1–3 VPO1	—	13–3	8–4	9–0
3	Şervan Çınar (TUR)	4	2	2	9	22	0–4 VSU	1–4 VSU1	—	11–2	8–0
4	Mahmut Tuncay (TUR)	4	1	3	6	16	0–4 VSU	1–3 VPO1	1–4 VSU1	—	10–1
5	Sercan Kesgin (TUR)	4	0	4	1	1	0–4 VSU	0–4 VSU	0–4 VSU	1–4 VSU1	—

Source: UWW

=== Men's Greco-Roman 60 kg ===
Round of 16
Kazım Tikence (TUR)	0
Meisam Dalkhani (IRI)	6
Erik Torba (HUN)	8
Nihad Guluzade (AZE)	3
Mert İlbars (TUR)	8
Cihan Yaşar (TUR)	3

Quarterfinals
Doğuş Ayazcı (TUR)	2
Meisam Dalkhani (IRI)	5
Krisztián Kecskeméti (HUN)	3
Aibek Yesmuratov (KAZ)	4
Dias Nurakov (KAZ)	1
Erik Torba (HUN)	4
Mert İlbars (TUR)	0
Kerem Kamal (TUR)	7^{F}

Semifinals
Meisam Dalkhani (IRI)	8
Aibek Yesmuratov (KAZ)	0
Erik Torba (HUN)	0
Kerem Kamal (TUR)	8

Final
Meisam Dalkhani (IRI)	0
Kerem Kamal (TUR)	9

Repechage round 1
Kazım Tikence (TUR)	5
Doğuş Ayazcı (TUR)	5

Bronze medal match
Kazım Tikence (TUR)	3
Aibek Yesmuratov (KAZ)	1
Mert İlbars (TUR)	WO
Erik Torba (HUN)

=== Men's Greco-Roman 63 kg ===
Round of 16
Mehmet Çeker (TUR)	9
Seyitcan Beytekin (TUR)	0
Ayhan Karakuş (TUR)	4
Barış Erbek (TUR)	2

Quarterfinals
Hakan Kızılarslan (TUR)	2
Mehmet Çeker (TUR)	10
Amir Mohammadzei (IRI)	9
Bekir Ateş (TUR)	2
Kaly Sulaimanov (KGZ)	5^{F}
Veysel Sarıkurt (TUR)	0
Ayhan Karakuş (TUR)	1
Enes Başar (TUR)	6

Semifinals
Mehmet Çeker (TUR)	13
Amir Mohammadzei (IRI)	4
Kaly Sulaimanov (KGZ)	3
Enes Başar (TUR)	8^{F}

Final
Mehmet Çeker (TUR)	1
Enes Başar (TUR)	8^{F}

Repechage round 1
Seyitcan Beytekin (TUR)	0
Hakan Kızılarslan (TUR)	8

Bronze medal match
Hakan Kızılarslan (TUR)	2
Amir Mohammadzei (IRI)	5
Ayhan Karakuş (TUR)	1
Kaly Sulaimanov (KGZ)	5

=== Men's Greco-Roman 67 kg ===
Round of 16
Murat Fırat (TUR)	5
Eren Ülkü (TUR)	2

Quarterfinals
István Váncza (HUN)	1
Murat Fırat (TUR)	3
Hacı Karakuş (TUR)	0
Saeid Esmaeili (IRI)	8
Mustafa Safa Yıldırım (TUR)	4
Ensar Karabacak (TUR)	0
Furkan Yıldız (TUR)	1
Hasan Mammadli (AZE)	1

Semifinals
Murat Fırat (TUR)	1
Saeid Esmaeili (IRI)	8
Mustafa Safa Yıldırım (TUR)	9
Furkan Yıldız (TUR)	0

Final
Saeid Esmaeili (IRI)	8
Mustafa Safa Yıldırım (TUR)	0

Bronze medal match
Hacı Karakuş (TUR)	1
Murat Fırat (TUR)	3
Ensar Karabacak (TUR)
Furkan Yıldız (TUR)	WO

=== Men's Greco-Roman 72 kg ===
Quarterfinals		Semifinals		Final
Mehmet Mustafa Şahin (TUR)
Abdullah Toprak (TUR)	WO	Abdullah Toprak (TUR)	1
Sajjad Imentalab (IRI)	8	Sajjad Imentalab (IRI)	5
Hasan Orakçı (TUR)	0			Sajjad Imentalab (IRI)	1
Róbert Fritsch (HUN)	4			Róbert Fritsch (HUN)	4
Murat Dağ (TUR)	0	Róbert Fritsch (HUN)	8
Krisztofer Klányi (HUN)	7	Krisztofer Klányi (HUN)	0
İbrahim Özdemir (TUR)	0

Bronze medal match
Hasan Orakçı (TUR)	0
Abdullah Toprak (TUR)	8
Murat Dağ (TUR)	2
Krisztofer Klányi (HUN)	1

=== Men's Greco-Roman 77 kg ===
Round of 16
Mehmet Can Daşdemir (TUR)	0
Amin Kavianinejad (IRI)	11
Serkan Akkoyun (TUR)	1
Ömer Can Doğan (TUR)	5
Ahmet Yılmaz (TUR)	4
Attila Tösmagi (HUN)	2

Quarterfinals
Zoltán Lévai (HUN)	1
Amin Kavianinejad (IRI)	3
Yüksel Sarıçiçek (TUR)	1
Gurban Gurbanov (AZE)	3
Cengiz Arslan (TUR)	4
Ömer Can Doğan (TUR)	1
Ahmet Yılmaz (TUR)	2
Abdurahman Kalkan (TUR)	3

Semifinals
Amin Kavianinejad (IRI)	0
Gurban Gurbanov (AZE)	9
Cengiz Arslan (TUR)	5
Abdurahman Kalkan (TUR)	1

Final
Gurban Gurbanov (AZE)	2
Cengiz Arslan (TUR)	5

Bronze medal match
Yüksel Sarıçiçek (TUR)	2
Amin Kavianinejad (IRI)	2
Ömer Can Doğan (TUR)	1
Abdurahman Kalkan (TUR)	3

=== Men's Greco-Roman 82 kg ===
21 June

Pos	Athlete	Pld	W	L	CP	TP	IRI	TUR	AZE	TUR
1	Jamal Esmaili (IRI)	3	3	0	11	22	—	4–1	9–0	9–0
2	Salih Aydın (TUR)	3	2	1	8	18	1–3 VPO1	—	6–3	11–1
3	Tunjay Vazirzade (AZE)	3	1	2	6	7	0–4 VSU	1–3 VPO1	—	4–3 Fall
4	Halil İlaslan (TUR)	3	0	3	1	4	0–4 VSU	1–4 VSU1	0–5 VFA	—

Source: UWW

Pos	Athlete	Pld	W	L	CP	TP	TUR	HUN	IRI
1	Hasan Berk Kılınç (TUR)	2	1	1	6	4	—	1–2	3–1 Fall
2	Erik Szilvássy (HUN)	2	1	1	4	3	3–1 VPO1	—	1–5
3	Rasoul Garmsiri (IRI)	2	1	1	3	6	0–5 VFA	3–1 VPO1	—

Source: UWW

Semifinals
Jamal Esmaili (IRI)	3
Erik Szilvássy (HUN)	1
Hasan Berk Kılınç (TUR)	3
Salih Aydın (TUR)	1

Final
Jamal Esmaili (IRI)	3
Hasan Berk Kılınç (TUR)	5
Bronze medal
Erik Szilvássy (HUN)	WO
Salih Aydın (TUR)

=== Men's Greco-Roman 87 kg ===
Round of 16
Mehdi Ebrahimi (IRI)	7
Ilias Pagkalidis (GRE)	1

Quarterfinals
Doğan Kaya (TUR)	7
Mehdi Ebrahimi (IRI)	8
Mahammad Ahmadiyev (AZE)	1
István Takács (HUN)	2
Emrah Kuş (TUR)	1
Pejman Poshtam (IRI)	2
Doğan Göktaş (TUR)	1
Dávid Losonczi (HUN)	4

Semifinals
Mehdi Ebrahimi (IRI)	1
István Takács (HUN)	9
Pejman Poshtam (IRI)	0
Dávid Losonczi (HUN)	9

Final
István Takács (HUN)	1
Dávid Losonczi (HUN)	5

Bronze medal match
Mahammad Ahmadiyev (AZE)	6^{F}
Mehdi Ebrahimi (IRI)	3
Doğan Göktaş (TUR)	3
Pejman Poshtam (IRI)	5

=== Men's Greco-Roman 97 kg ===
Round of 16
Alex Szőke (HUN)	1
Abdülkadir Çebi (TUR)	1
Doğan Yılmaz (TUR)	0
Emincan Enez (TUR)	2
Muhittin Sarıçiçek (TUR)	5
Hamed Abdovali (IRI)	2
Metehan Başar (TUR)	1
Tamás Lévai (HUN)	1

Quarterfinals
Beytullah Kayışdağ (TUR)	3
Alex Szőke (HUN)	1
Emincan Enez (TUR)	2
Murad Ahmadiyev (AZE)	7^{F}
Mustafa Olgun (TUR)	1
Muhittin Sarıçiçek (TUR)	1
Metehan Başar (TUR)	1
Oktay Demir (TUR)	1

Semifinals
Beytullah Kayışdağ (TUR)	1
Murad Ahmadiyev (AZE)	3
Mustafa Olgun (TUR)	0
Metehan Başar (TUR)	5

Final
Murad Ahmadiyev (AZE)	0
Metehan Başar (TUR)	7

Repechage round 1
Tamás Lévai (HUN)	6
Oktay Demir (TUR)	0

Bronze medal match
Emincan Enez (TUR)	1
Beytullah Kayışdağ (TUR)	3
Tamás Lévai (HUN)	6
Mustafa Olgun (TUR)	0

=== Men's Greco-Roman 130 kg ===
22 June

Pos	Athlete	Pld	W	L	CP	TP	TUR	TUR	TUR	HUN
1	Fatih Bozkurt (TUR)	3	3	0	10	19	—	6–2	4–1	9–0
2	Osman Yıldırım (TUR)	3	2	1	9	19	1–3 VPO1	—	9–0	8–0
3	Ali Nail Arslan (TUR)	3	1	2	4	7	1–3 VPO1	0–4 VSU	—	6–2
4	Dáriusz Vitek (HUN)	3	0	3	1	2	0–4 VSU	0–4 VSU	1–3 VPO1	—

Source: UWW

Pos	Athlete	Pld	W	L	CP	TP	IRI	AZE	TUR
1	Morteza Alghosi (IRI)	2	2	0	7	14	—	5–1	9–0
2	Sarkhan Mammadov (AZE)	2	1	1	4	5	1–3 VPO1	—	4–1
3	Ahmet Eren Coşkun (TUR)	2	0	2	1	1	0–4 VSU	1–3 VPO1	—

Source: UWW

Semifinals
Fatih Bozkurt (TUR)	9
Sarkhan Mammadov (AZE)	0
Morteza Alghosi (IRI)	1
Osman Yıldırım (TUR)	2

Final
Fatih Bozkurt (TUR)	3
Osman Yıldırım (TUR)	5
Bronze medal
Sarkhan Mammadov (AZE)	1
Morteza Alghosi (IRI)	4
