= 2020 Individual Wrestling World Cup – Men's Greco-Roman 130 kg =

The Men's Greco-Roman 130 kg is a competition featured at the 2020 Individual Wrestling World Cup, and was held in Belgrade, Serbia on 13 and 14 December 2020.

== Medalists ==
Gold	Sergey Semenov; Russia
Silver	Osman Yıldırım; Turkey
Bronze	Mykola Kuchmii; Ukraine
Bronze	Beka Kandelaki; Azerbaijan

== Results ==
Legend

- F — Won by fall

1/8 finals
David Ovasapyan (ARM)	3
Boban Živanović (SRB)	1
Štěpán David (CZE)	2
Yasmani Acosta (CHI)	7
Rafał Krajewski (POL)	1
Osman Yıldırım (TUR)	5
Nikolaos Ntounias (GRE)	2
Hamza Haloui (ALG)	2
Naveen Sevlia (IND)	0
Eduard Popp (GER)	2
Alin Alexuc-Ciurariu (ROU)	1
Beka Kandelaki (AZE)	3

Quarterfinals
Sergey Semenov (RUS)	9
Mykola Kuchmii (UKR)	0
David Ovasapyan (ARM)	1
Yasmani Acosta (CHI)	1
Osman Yıldırım (TUR)	9
Hamza Haloui (ALG)	0
Eduard Popp (GER)	0
Beka Kandelaki (AZE)	4^{F}

Semifinals
Sergey Semenov (RUS)	8
David Ovasapyan (ARM)	0
Osman Yıldırım (TUR)	9
Beka Kandelaki (AZE)	1

Final
Sergey Semenov (RUS)	7
Osman Yıldırım (TUR)	1

Repechage round 1
Rafał Krajewski (POL)	9
Hamza Haloui (ALG)	0

Bronze medals
Mykola Kuchmii (UKR)	4
David Ovasapyan (ARM)	2
Rafał Krajewski (POL)	0
Beka Kandelaki (AZE)	9
