= 2022 Vehbi Emre & Hamit Kaplan Tournament =

Vehbi Emre & Hamit Kaplan 2022
- Host city: Istanbul, Turkey
- Dates: 24–27 February
- Stadium: Başakşehir Youth and Sports Facility

Champions
- Greco-Roman: Turkey

The 39th Vehbi Emre & Hamit Kaplan Tournament 2022 was a wrestling event held in Istanbul, Turkey, from 24 February to 27 February 2022. It was held as the first of the ranking series together with the 2022 Yasar Dogu Tournament. The event aired freely on the United World Wrestling.

This international tournament includes competition men's Greco-Roman wrestling. This ranking tournament was held in honor of the Olympic Champion, Hamit Kaplan and Turkish Wrestler and manager Vehbi Emre.

== Ranking Series ==
Ranking Series Calendar 2022:

- 1st Ranking Series: 24-27 February, Turkey, Istanbul ⇒ 2022 Yasar Dogu Tournament
  2022 Vehbi Emre & Hamit Kaplan Tournament
- 2nd Ranking Series: 2-5 June, Kazakhstan, Almaty ⇒ 2022 Bolat Turlykhanov Cup
- 3rd Ranking Series: 22-25 June, Italy, Rome ⇒ Matteo Pellicone Ranking Series 2022
- 4th Ranking Series: 14-17 July, Tunisia, Tunis ⇒ 2022 Tunis Ranking Series

== Competition schedule ==
All times are (UTC+3)

Date	Time	Event
24 February Thursday	10.30-14.30	Qualification rounds & repechage GR – 55-60-63-67-87-97-130 kg
24 February Thursday	18.00-20.30	Final matches and awarding ceremony: GR – 55-60-63-67-87-97-130 kg
25 February Friday	10.30-14.30	Qualification rounds & repechage GR – 72-77-82kg & WW – 57-62-68-76 kg
25 February Friday	18.00-20.30	Final matches and awarding ceremony: Finals GR – 72-77-82 kg & WW – 57-62-68-76 kg
26 February Saturday	10.30-14.30	Qualification rounds & repechage WW – 50-53-55-59-65-72 kg & FS – 97-125 kg
26 February Saturday	18.00-20.30	Final matches and awarding ceremony: Finals WW – 50-53-55-59-65-72 kg & FS – 97-125 kg
27 February Sunday	10.30-14.30	Qualification rounds & repechage FS – 57-61-65-70-74-79-86-92 kg
27 February Sunday	18.00-20.30	Final matches and awarding ceremony: Finals FS – 57-61-65-70-74-79-86-92 kg

== Medal table ==
Rank	Nation	Gold	Silver	Bronze	Total
1	Turkey*	5	2	10	17
2	Uzbekistan	3	0	1	4
3	Azerbaijan	1	2	3	6
4	Kazakhstan	1	1	3	5
5	Moldova	0	2	0	2
6	Norway	0	1	1	2
7	Finland	0	1	0	1
7	Lithuania	0	1	0	1
9	India	0	0	1	1
9	Poland	0	0	1	1
Totals (10 entries)		10	10	20	40

== Team ranking ==
Rank	Men's Greco-Roman	
Rank	Team	Points
1	Turkey	205
2	Kazakhstan	131
3	Azerbaijan	127
4	Uzbekistan	98
5	Moldova	40

== Medal overview ==
=== Men's Greco-Roman ===
Event	Gold	Silver	Bronze
55 kg	Adem Uzun; Turkey	Amangali Bekbolatov; Kazakhstan	Doğuş Ayazcı; Turkey
60 kg	Yernar Fidakhmetov; Kazakhstan	Ekrem Öztürk; Turkey	Yernur Fidakhmetov; Kazakhstan
60 kg	Yernar Fidakhmetov; Kazakhstan	Ekrem Öztürk; Turkey	Gyanender Dahiya; India
63 kg	Islomjon Bakhramov; Uzbekistan	Victor Ciobanu; Moldova	Ahmet Uyar; Turkey
63 kg	Islomjon Bakhramov; Uzbekistan	Victor Ciobanu; Moldova	Taleh Mammadov; Azerbaijan
67 kg	Makhmud Bakhshilloev; Uzbekistan	Morten Thoresen; Norway	Meirzhan Shermakhanbet; Kazakhstan
67 kg	Makhmud Bakhshilloev; Uzbekistan	Morten Thoresen; Norway	Volkan Çakıl; Turkey
72 kg	Selçuk Can; Turkey	Kristupas Šleiva; Lithuania	Murat Dağ; Turkey
72 kg	Selçuk Can; Turkey	Kristupas Šleiva; Lithuania	Mateusz Bernatek; Poland
77 kg	Yunus Emre Başar; Turkey	Sanan Suleymanov; Azerbaijan	Tamerlan Shadukayev; Kazakhstan
77 kg	Yunus Emre Başar; Turkey	Sanan Suleymanov; Azerbaijan	Furkan Bayrak; Turkey
82 kg	Burhan Akbudak; Turkey	Mihail Bradu; Moldova	Rafig Huseynov; Azerbaijan
82 kg	Burhan Akbudak; Turkey	Mihail Bradu; Moldova	Tunjay Vazirzade; Azerbaijan
87 kg	Islam Abbasov; Azerbaijan	Metehan Başar; Turkey	Mehmet Ali Küçükosman; Turkey
87 kg	Islam Abbasov; Azerbaijan	Metehan Başar; Turkey	Ali Cengiz; Turkey
97 kg	Rustam Assakalov; Uzbekistan	Arvi Savolainen; Finland	Felix Baldauf; Norway
97 kg	Rustam Assakalov; Uzbekistan	Arvi Savolainen; Finland	Beytullah Kayışdağ; Turkey
130 kg	Osman Yıldırım; Turkey	Beka Kandelaki; Azerbaijan	Muminjon Abdullaev; Uzbekistan
130 kg	Osman Yıldırım; Turkey	Beka Kandelaki; Azerbaijan	Rıza Kayaalp; Turkey

== Participating nations ==
123 competitors from 16 nations participated.

- Austria (1)
- Azerbaijan (12)
- Brazil (3)
- Finland (4)
- Greece (1)
- India (9)
- Italy (2)
- Kazakhstan (28)
- Kyrgyzstan (4)
- Lithuania (6)
- Moldova (3)
- Norway (2)
- Poland (5)
- Serbia (3)
- Turkey (30)
- Uzbekistan (10)

== Results ==
=== Men's Greco-Roman 55 kg ===
Legend

- F — Won by fall

Elimination groups

Group A

Pos	Athlete	Pld	W	L	CP	TP	KAZ	TUR	AZE	TUR
1	Marlan Mukashev (KAZ)	3	2	1	9	15	—	10–6	3–6	2–0 Fall
2	Doğuş Ayazcı (TUR)	3	2	1	8	14	1–3 PO1	—	2–0	6–0
3	İbrahim Nurullayev (AZE)	3	2	1	6	12	3–1 PO1	0–3 PO	—	6–5
4	Ahmet Taşkınoğlu (TUR)	3	0	3	1	5	0–5 FA	0–3 PO	1–3 PO1	—

Source: UWW

Group B

Pos	Athlete	Pld	W	L	CP	TP	KAZ	TUR	KAZ
1	Amangali Bekbolatov (KAZ)	2	2	0	8	17	—	8–0	9–0
2	Adem Uzun (TUR)	2	1	1	4	8	0–4 SU	—	8–0
3	Nurzat Kabdyrakhimov (KAZ)	2	0	2	0	0	0–4 SU	0–4 SU	—

Source: UWW

Knockout round

Semifinals
Marlan Mukashev (KAZ)	2
Adem Uzun (TUR)	10
Amangali Bekbolatov (KAZ)	6
Doğuş Ayazcı (TUR)	2

Finals
Adem Uzun (TUR)	6
Amangali Bekbolatov (KAZ)	5
Bronze medal match
Marlan Mukashev (KAZ)	1
Doğuş Ayazcı (TUR)	5

=== Men's Greco-Roman 60 kg ===
Legend

- F — Won by fall
- R — Retired
- WO — Won by walkover

1/8 finals
Dastan Zarlykhanov (KAZ)	4
Ayhan Karakuş (TUR)	1
Firuz Tukhtaev (UZB)	1
Eldaniz Azizli (AZE)	5

Quarterfinals
Yernar Fidakhmetov (KAZ)	9
Ahmet Uçar (TUR)	0
Yernur Fidakhmetov (KAZ)	7
Dastan Zarlykhanov (KAZ)	5
Marat Garipov (BRA)	3
Gyanender Dahiya (IND)	7
Eldaniz Azizli (AZE)	0^{R}
Ekrem Öztürk (TUR)	5

Semifinals
Yernar Fidakhmetov (KAZ)	4^{F}
Yernur Fidakhmetov (KAZ)	0
Gyanender Dahiya (IND)
Ekrem Öztürk (TUR)	WO

Final
Yernar Fidakhmetov (KAZ)	7
Ekrem Öztürk (TUR)	1

Bronze medal match
Ahmet Uçar (TUR)	8
Yernur Fidakhmetov (KAZ)	9
Eldaniz Azizli (AZE)	0^{R}
Gyanender Dahiya (IND)	2

=== Men's Greco-Roman 63 kg ===
Legend

- F — Won by fall
- WO — Won by walkover
- C — Won by 3 cautions given to the opponent

1/8 finals
Aidos Sultangali (KAZ)	5^{F}
Sagar (IND)	0
Abdurrahman Altan (TUR)	1
Victor Ciobanu (MDA)	3
Taleh Mammadov (AZE)	2
Islomjon Bakhramov (UZB)	8^{F}
Bagylan Zhakansha (KAZ)	5
Galym Kabdunassarov (KAZ)	10

Quarterfinals
Ahmet Uyar (TUR)	5
Aidos Sultangali (KAZ)	1
Victor Ciobanu (MDA)	WO
Justas Petravičius (LTU)
Rahman Bilici (TUR)	6
Islomjon Bakhramov (UZB)	9
Galym Kabdunassarov (KAZ)	4
Dastan Kadyrov (KGZ)	5

Semifinals
Ahmet Uyar (TUR)	0
Victor Ciobanu (MDA)	10
Islomjon Bakhramov (UZB)	9
Dastan Kadyrov (KGZ)	1

Final
Victor Ciobanu (MDA)	0
Islomjon Bakhramov (UZB)	9

Repechage round 1
Abdurrahman Altan (TUR)	WO
Justas Petravičius (LTU)
Taleh Mammadov (AZE)	3
Rahman Bilici (TUR)	1

Bronze medal match
Abdurrahman Altan (TUR)	1
Ahmet Uyar (TUR)	8^{C}
Taleh Mammadov (AZE)	8
Dastan Kadyrov (KGZ)	0

=== Men's Greco-Roman 67 kg ===
Legend

- F — Won by fall

1/8 finals
Meirzhan Shermakhanbet (KAZ)	3
Namaz Rustamov (AZE)	2
Morten Thoresen (NOR)	10
Kaly Sulaimanov (KGZ)	4
Furkan Sonkur (TUR)	1
Makhmud Bakhshilloev (UZB)	8
Furkan Yıldız (TUR)	8
Sultan Assetuly (KAZ)	3

Quarterfinals
Daniyar Kalenov (KAZ)	1
Meirzhan Shermakhanbet (KAZ)	5
Morten Thoresen (NOR)	2
Ashu Bazard (IND)	1
Volkan Çakıl (TUR)	1
Makhmud Bakhshilloev (UZB)	5
Furkan Yıldız (TUR)	12
Donior Islamov (MDA)	1

Semifinals
Meirzhan Shermakhanbet (KAZ)	3
Morten Thoresen (NOR)	5
Makhmud Bakhshilloev (UZB)	4
Furkan Yıldız (TUR)	3

Final
Morten Thoresen (NOR)	2
Makhmud Bakhshilloev (UZB)	5

Repechage round 1
Kaly Sulaimanov (KGZ)	9
Ashu Bazard (IND)	0
Furkan Sonkur (TUR)	2
Volkan Çakıl (TUR)	6

Bronze medal match
Kaly Sulaimanov (KGZ)	0
Meirzhan Shermakhanbet (KAZ)	10
Volkan Çakıl (TUR)	WO
Furkan Yıldız (TUR)

=== Men's Greco-Roman 72 kg ===
Legend

- F — Won by fall

1/8 finals
Ensar Karabacak (TUR)	7
Bek Konurbaev (KGZ)	1
Kristupas Šleiva (LTU)	4
Murat Dağ (TUR)	2
Vikas Dalal (IND)	4
Abylaikhan Amzeyev (KAZ)	5
Suimon Ikramov (KGZ)	2
Azat Sadykov (KAZ)	3
Mateusz Bernatek (POL)	1
Selçuk Can (TUR)	3
Alikhan Kokenov (KAZ)	4
Mirzobek Rahmatov (UZB)	3

Quarterfinals
Ulvu Ganizade (AZE)	5
Ensar Karabacak (TUR)	6
Kristupas Šleiva (LTU)	10
Abylaikhan Amzeyev (KAZ)	0
Azat Sadykov (KAZ)	1
Selçuk Can (TUR)	3
Alikhan Kokenov (KAZ)	1
Mikko Peltokangas (FIN)	3

Semifinals
Ensar Karabacak (TUR)	0
Kristupas Šleiva (LTU)	11
Selçuk Can (TUR)	8
Mikko Peltokangas (FIN)	0

Final
Kristupas Šleiva (LTU)
Selçuk Can (TUR)	WO

Repechage round 1
Murat Dağ (TUR)	7
Abylaikhan Amzeyev (KAZ)	0
Mateusz Bernatek (POL)	3
Azat Sadykov (KAZ)	1

Bronze medal match
Murat Dağ (TUR)	8
Ensar Karabacak (TUR)	5
Mateusz Bernatek (POL)	5
Mikko Peltokangas (FIN)	2

=== Men's Greco-Roman 77 kg ===
Legend

- F — Won by fall
- WO — Won by walkover

1/8 finals
Matias Lipasti (FIN)	1
Tamerlan Shadukayev (KAZ)	10
Viktor Nemeš (SRB)	1
Aram Vardanyan (UZB)	1
Maxat Yerezhepov (KAZ)	1
Ahmet Yılmaz (TUR)	7
Joílson Júnior (BRA)	0
Furkan Bayrak (TUR)	9
Sajan Bhanwal (IND)	0
Sanan Suleymanov (AZE)	8

Quarterfinals
Yunus Emre Başar (TUR)	5
Tamerlan Shadukayev (KAZ)	1
Viktor Nemeš (SRB)	1
Ahmet Yılmaz (TUR)	1
Gevorg Sahakyan (POL)	4
Furkan Bayrak (TUR)	9
Sanan Suleymanov (AZE)	2
Demeu Zhadrayev (KAZ)	0

Semifinals
Yunus Emre Başar (TUR)	1
Viktor Nemeš (SRB)	1
Furkan Bayrak (TUR)	2
Sanan Suleymanov (AZE)	3

Final
Yunus Emre Başar (TUR)	2
Sanan Suleymanov (AZE)	1

Repechage round 1
Sajan Bhanwal (IND)	0
Demeu Zhadrayev (KAZ)	8

Bronze medal match
Tamerlan Shadukayev (KAZ)	1
Viktor Nemeš (SRB)	1
Demeu Zhadrayev (KAZ)	5
Furkan Bayrak (TUR)	6

=== Men's Greco-Roman 82 kg ===
Legend

- F — Won by fall

1/8 finals
Harpreet Singh Sandhu (IND)	0
Rafig Huseynov (AZE)	8
Dias Kalen (KAZ)	3
Rakhmet Sapiyev (KAZ)	7

Quarterfinals
Emrah Kuş (TUR)	1
Rafig Huseynov (AZE)	4
Burhan Akbudak (TUR)	9
Ilimdor Satayev (KAZ)	0
Tunjay Vazirzade (AZE)	3
Hasan Berk Kılınç (TUR)	0
Rakhmet Sapiyev (KAZ)	4
Mihail Bradu (MDA)	12

Semifinals
Rafig Huseynov (AZE)	0
Burhan Akbudak (TUR)	9
Tunjay Vazirzade (AZE)	3
Mihail Bradu (MDA)	6^{F}

Final
Burhan Akbudak (TUR)	2
Mihail Bradu (MDA)	1

Bronze medal match
Ilimdor Satayev (KAZ)	0
Rafig Huseynov (AZE)	11
Rakhmet Sapiyev (KAZ)	1
Tunjay Vazirzade (AZE)	7

=== Men's Greco-Roman 87 kg ===
Legend

- F — Won by fall

1/8 finals
Zhantas Nurgali (KAZ)	1
~~Zurabi Datunashvili (SRB)~~	9
Arkadiusz Kułynycz (POL)	9
Jalgasbay Berdimuratov (UZB)	1
Sunil Kumar (IND)	1
Ali Cengiz (TUR)	11
Islam Abbasov (AZE)	9
Nurbek Khashimbekov (UZB)	0

Quarterfinals
Mehmet Ali Küçükosman (TUR)	1
~~Zurabi Datunashvili (SRB)~~	5
Arkadiusz Kułynycz (POL)	3
Metehan Başar (TUR)	3
Nursultan Tursynov (KAZ)	3
Ali Cengiz (TUR)	3
Islam Abbasov (AZE)	9
Umalt Daudov (KAZ)	0

Semifinals
~~Zurabi Datunashvili (SRB)~~	5
Metehan Başar (TUR)	1
Ali Cengiz (TUR)	1
Islam Abbasov (AZE)	4

Final
~~Zurabi Datunashvili (SRB)~~	3
Islam Abbasov (AZE)	6

Repechage round 1
Zhantas Nurgali (KAZ)	3
Mehmet Ali Küçükosman (TUR)	6
Nurbek Khashimbekov (UZB)	3
Umalt Daudov (KAZ)	2^{F}

Bronze medal match
Mehmet Ali Küçükosman (TUR)	1
Metehan Başar (TUR)	1
Umalt Daudov (KAZ)	2
Ali Cengiz (TUR)	10

=== Men's Greco-Roman 97 kg ===
Legend

- F — Won by fall
- WO — Won by walkover

Final
Rustam Assakalov (UZB)	5
Arvi Savolainen (FIN)	1

Top half

Round of 32
Rustam Assakalov (UZB)	WO
Nikoloz Kakhelashvili (ITA)

Round of 16
Vilius Laurinaitis (LTU)	1
Martynas Nemsevičius (LTU)	1
Rustam Assakalov (UZB)	8
Abdül Kadir Çebi (TUR)	0
Abrorbek Nurmukhammedov (UZB)	0
Felix Baldauf (NOR)	8
Daniel Gastl (AUT)	2
Murat Lokyaev (AZE)	10

Quarterfinals
Vilius Laurinaitis (LTU)	3
Rustam Assakalov (UZB)	5
Felix Baldauf (NOR)	5
Murat Lokyaev (AZE)	0

Semifinals
Rustam Assakalov (UZB)	7
Felix Baldauf (NOR)	1

Bottom half

Round of 32
Islam Umayev (KAZ)	0
Arvi Savolainen (FIN)	7
İbrahim Tığcı (TUR)	3
Mikheil Kajaia (SRB)	7

Round of 16
Igor Queiroz (BRA)	1
Hardeep Singh (IND)	4
Arvi Savolainen (FIN)	3
Sanzhar Serikkhan (KAZ)	1
Tadeusz Michalik (POL)	1
Mikheil Kajaia (SRB)	1
Beytullah Kayışdağ (TUR)	6
Arif Niftillayev (AZE)	3

Quarterfinals
Hardeep Singh (IND)	0
Arvi Savolainen (FIN)	8
Mikheil Kajaia (SRB)	1
Beytullah Kayışdağ (TUR)	6

Semifinals
Arvi Savolainen (FIN)	2
Beytullah Kayışdağ (TUR)	1

Repechage round 1
Nikoloz Kakhelashvili (ITA)
Abdül Kadir Çebi (TUR)	WO
Islam Umayev (KAZ)	7
Sanzhar Serikkhan (KAZ)	2

Repechage round 2
Abdül Kadir Çebi (TUR)	6
Vilius Laurinaitis (LTU)	0
Islam Umayev (KAZ)	8^{F}
Hardeep Singh (IND)	1

Bronze medal match
Abdül Kadir Çebi (TUR)	2
Felix Baldauf (NOR)	4
Islam Umayev (KAZ)	0
Beytullah Kayışdağ (TUR)	9

=== Men's Greco-Roman 130 kg ===
Legend

- F — Won by fall

1/8 finals
Osman Yıldırım (TUR)	9
Konsta Mäenpää (FIN)	0
Alimkhan Syzdykov (KAZ)	5
Danila Sotnikov (ITA)	1
Naveen Sevlia (IND)	1
Ali Nail Arslan (TUR)	7
Nikolaos Ntounias (GRE)	0
Beka Kandelaki (AZE)	8
Rafał Krajewski (POL)	3
Romas Fridrikas (LTU)	0
Anton Savenko (KAZ)	3
Mantas Knystautas (LTU)	3

Quarterfinals
Muminjon Abdullaev (UZB)	1
Osman Yıldırım (TUR)	2
Alimkhan Syzdykov (KAZ)	10
Ali Nail Arslan (TUR)	0
Beka Kandelaki (AZE)	5
Rafał Krajewski (POL)	4
Anton Savenko (KAZ)	1
Rıza Kayaalp (TUR)	4

Semifinals
Osman Yıldırım (TUR)	9
Alimkhan Syzdykov (KAZ)	0
Beka Kandelaki (AZE)	2^{F}
Rıza Kayaalp (TUR)	5

Final
Osman Yıldırım (TUR)	3
Beka Kandelaki (AZE)	1

Repechage round 1
Konsta Mäenpää (FIN)	1
Muminjon Abdullaev (UZB)	5
Nikolaos Ntounias (GRE)	2
Rafał Krajewski (POL)	4^{F}

Bronze medal match
Muminjon Abdullaev (UZB)	4
Alimkhan Syzdykov (KAZ)	1
Rafał Krajewski (POL)	0
Rıza Kayaalp (TUR)	8
