= Osman Yıldırım =

Turkish Greco-Roman wrestler

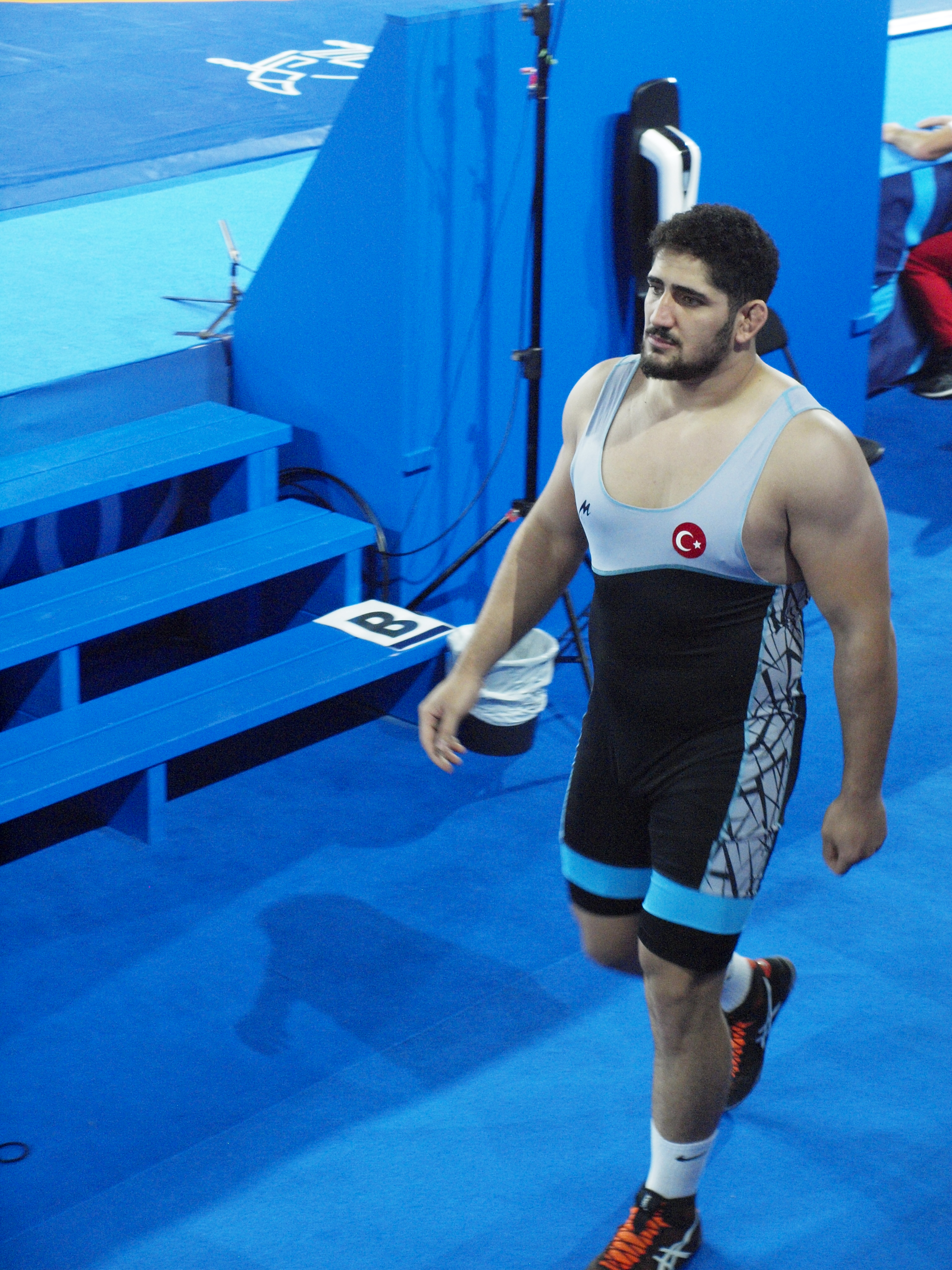
- Osman Yıldırım at the 2021 World Wrestling Championships in Oslo, Norway

Personal information
- Born: March 25, 1996 (age 30) Konya, Turkey
- Education: Karabuk University
- Height: 1.88 m (6 ft 2 in)
- Weight: 130 kg (290 lb; 20 st)

Sport
- Country: Turkey
- Sport: Amateur wrestling
- Event: Greco-Roman - 130 Kg
- Team: ASKİ Spor Club
Medal record
Men's Greco-Roman wrestling
Representing Turkey
Individual World Cup
Silver medal – second place	2020 Belgrade	130 kg
Mediterranean Games
Gold medal – first place	2022 Oran	130 kg
World University Championship
Gold medal – first place	2018 Goiana	130 kg
Islamic Solidarity Games
Gold medal – first place	2017 Baku	130 kg
Silver medal – second place	2021 Konya	130 kg
Vehbi Emre & Hamit Kaplan Tournament
Gold medal – first place	2021 Istanbul	130 kg
Gold medal – first place	2022 Istanbul	130 kg
Gold medal – first place	2023 Istanbul	130 kg
Bronze medal – third place	2017 Istanbul	130 kg
Bronze medal – third place	2016 Istanbul	130 kg
Grand Prix
Gold medal – first place	2019 Minsk	130 kg
Gold medal – first place	2019 Sassari	130 kg
Gold medal – first place	2021 Zagreb	130 kg
Gold medal – first place	2022 Zagreb	130 kg
Gold medal – first place	2022 Almaty	130 kg
Silver medal – second place	2018 Mahshahr	130 kg
Bronze medal – third place	2020 Warsaw	130 kg
Bronze medal – third place	2023 Bishkek	130 kg
World U23 Championships
Silver medal – second place	2018 Bucharest	130 kg
Bronze medal – third place	2019 Budapest	130 kg
European U23 Championship
Gold medal – first place	2017 Szombathely	130 kg
Silver medal – second place	2018 Istanbul	130 kg
Bronze medal – third place	2019 Novi Sad	130 kg
World Juniors Championships
Silver medal – second place	2016 Macon	120 kg
Bronze medal – third place	2014 Zagreb	120 kg
Bronze medal – third place	2015 Salvador da Bahia	120 kg

Osman Yıldırım (born March 25, 1996) is a Turkish Greco-Roman wrestler competing in the 130 kg division of Greco-Roman wrestling. He is a member of the ASKİ Spor Club.

== Career ==
Osman Yıldırım, competing in Greco-Roman wrestling 130 kilograms category, won a silver medal in the U23 World Wrestling Championships, which was held in Romanian capital of Bucharest.

Osman Yıldırım loses to Sergey Semenov from Russia in final of men's Greco-Roman 130 kg in Belgrade, Serbia. Turkish Greco-Roman wrestler Osman Yıldırım on Monday earned another silver medal in Serbia in the final of the Individual World Cup with his defeat to a Russian wrestler.

In 2022, he won the gold medal in his event at the Vehbi Emre & Hamit Kaplan Tournament held in Istanbul, Turkey. He won the gold medal in his event at the Bolat Turlykhanov Cup the second of the ranking series of United World Wrestling held in Almaty, Kazakhstan. He won the gold medal in the 130 kg event at the 2022 Mediterranean Games held in Oran, Algeria. Yıldırım beat his Egyptian opponent Abdellatif Mohamed 5-1 to win gold in the 130-kilogram final. He won the silver medal in the men's Greco-Roman 130 kg event at the 2021 Islamic Solidarity Games held in Konya, Turkey.

== Major results ==
Year	Tournament	Location	Result	Event
2017	Islamic Solidarity Games	Baku, Azerbaijan	1st	Greco-Roman 130 kg
2020	Individual World Cup	Budapest, Hungary	2nd	Greco-Roman 130 kg
2022	Mediterranean Games	Oran, Algeria	1st	Greco-Roman 130 kg
2022	Islamic Solidarity Games	Konya, Turkey	2nd	Greco-Roman 130 kg
