= Fatih Bozkurt =

Turkish Greco-Roman wrestler

Personal information
- Born: 6 April 2000 (age 26) Afyon, Turkey
- Height: 190 cm (6 ft 3 in)
- Weight: 130 kg (290 lb; 20 st)

Sport
- Country: Turkey
- Sport: Amateur wrestling
- Event: Greco-Roman - 130 kg
- Club: Istanbul BB SK
Medal record
Men's Greco-Roman wrestling
Representing Turkey
Vehbi Emre & Hamit Kaplan Tournament
Silver medal – second place	2023 Istanbul	130 kg
Dan Kolov - Nikola Petrov Tournament
Silver medal – second place	2021 Plovdiv	130 kg
Grand Prix
Silver medal – second place	2022 Zagreb	130 kg
Bronze medal – third place	2023 Bishkek	130 kg
World U23 Championships
Gold medal – first place	2022 Pontevedra	130 kg
European U23 Championship
Silver medal – second place	2022 Plovdiv	130 kg
Bronze medal – third place	2021 Skopje	130 kg

Fatih Bozkurt (born 6 April 2000) is a Turkish Greco-Roman wrestler competing in the 130 kg division. He is a member of İstanbul Büyükşehir Belediyesi S.K.

== Career ==
Fatih Bozkurt captured bronze medal in men's Greco-Roman 130 kg at 2021 European U23 Wrestling Championships.

Fatih Bozkurt captured the silver medal in men's Greco-Roman 130 kg at 2022 European U23 Wrestling Championships.
