= 2023 European U23 Wrestling Championships =

Wrestling tournament in Romania

2023 European U23 Championships
- Host city: Bucharest, Romania
- Dates: 13–19 March 2023
- Stadium: Polyvalent Hall

Champions
- Freestyle: Azerbaijan
- Greco-Roman: Turkey
- Women: Ukraine

The 2023 European U23 Wrestling Championships was the 8th edition of the European U23 Wrestling Championships of combined events, and it was held from 13 to 19 March in Bucharest, Romania.

== Incidents ==
The Azerbaijani wrestler, Rahim Hasanov, hit the Armenian athlete, Karapet Manvelyan, in the face after losing in the quarter-finals of the championship, when the latter was reaching out to him for a handshake. The International Wrestling Federation disqualified Hasanov for unsportsmanlike behaviour.

In the match between Solomon Manashvili of Georgia and Vakhit Galayev of Azerbaijan, the referees showed red cards to both wrestlers and disqualified them after a fight broke out after the end of the match. Quarterfinal losers Volodymyr Kochanov of Ukraine and Martin Simonyan of Armenia played a semifinal match again.

== Competition schedule ==
All times are (UTC+2)

| Date | Time | Event |
|---|---|---|
| 13 March | 11.30-14.30 | Qualification rounds: GR – 55,63,77,87,130 kg |
| 13 March | 18:30-19.30 | Semi-finals: GR – 55,63,77,87,130 kg |
| 14 March | 11.30-14.30 | Qualification rounds: GR – 60,67,72,82,97 kg; Repechage: GR – 55,63,77,87,130 kg |
| 14 March | 16.45-17.45 | Semi-finals: GR – 60,67,72,82,97 kg |
| 14 March | 18.00-20.30 | Finals: GR – 55,63,77,87,130 kg |
| 15 March | 11.30-14.00 | Qualification rounds: WW – 50,55,59,68,76 kg; Repechage: GR – 60,67,72,82,97 kg |
| 15 March | 16.45-17.45 | Semi-finals: WW – 50,55,59,68,76 kg |
| 15 March | 18.00-20.30 | Finals: GR – 60,67,72,82,97 kg |
| 16 March | 11.30-14.00 | Qualification rounds: WW – 53,57,62,65,72 kg; Repechage: WW – 50,55,59,68,76 kg |
| 16 March | 16.45-17.45 | Semi-finals: WW – 53,57,62,65,72 kg |
| 16 March | 18.00-20.30 | Finals: WW – 50,55,59,68,76 kg |
| 17 March | 11.30-14.00 | Qualification rounds: FS – 57,65,70,79,97 kg; Repechage: WW – 53,57,62,65,72 kg |
| 17 March | 16.45-17.45 | Semi-finals: FS – 57,65,70,79,97 kg |
| 17 March | 18.00-20.30 | Finals: WW – 53,57,62,65,72 kg |
| 18 March | 11.30-14.00 | Qualification rounds: FS – 61,74,86,92,125 kg; Repechage: FS – 57,65,70,79,97 kg |
| 18 March | 16.45-17.45 | Semi-finals: FS – 61,74,86,92,125 kg |
| 18 March | 18.00-20.30 | Finals: FS – 57,65,70,79,97 kg |
| 19 March | 16.30-17.45 | Repechage: FS – 61,74,86,92,125 kg |
| 19 March | 18.00-20.30 | Finals: FS – 61,74,86,92,125 kg |

== Medal table ==
* Host nation (Romania)

| Rank | Nation | Gold | Silver | Bronze | Total |
|---|---|---|---|---|---|
| 1 | Azerbaijan | 6 | 3 | 3 | 12 |
| 2 | Ukraine | 5 | 5 | 5 | 15 |
| 3 | France | 3 | 2 | 2 | 7 |
| 4 | Turkey | 2 | 4 | 11 | 17 |
| 5 | Georgia | 2 | 3 | 6 | 11 |
| 6 | Romania* | 2 | 1 | 3 | 6 |
| 7 | Hungary | 2 | 1 | 2 | 5 |
| 8 | Finland | 2 | 0 | 0 | 2 |
| 9 | Moldova | 1 | 1 | 5 | 7 |
| 10 | Germany | 1 | 0 | 7 | 8 |
| 11 | Poland | 1 | 0 | 2 | 3 |
| 12 | Bulgaria | 1 | 0 | 1 | 2 |
| 12 | Sweden | 1 | 0 | 1 | 2 |
| 14 | Greece | 1 | 0 | 0 | 1 |
| 15 | Armenia | 0 | 4 | 6 | 10 |
| 16 | Italy | 0 | 1 | 2 | 3 |
| 17 | Israel | 0 | 1 | 1 | 2 |
| 18 | Denmark | 0 | 1 | 0 | 1 |
| 18 | Lithuania | 0 | 1 | 0 | 1 |
| 18 | Norway | 0 | 1 | 0 | 1 |
| 18 | Slovakia | 0 | 1 | 0 | 1 |
| 22 | Estonia | 0 | 0 | 1 | 1 |
| 22 | Latvia | 0 | 0 | 1 | 1 |
| 22 | Serbia | 0 | 0 | 1 | 1 |
| Totals (24 entries) | | 30 | 30 | 60 | 120 |

== Team ranking ==
| Rank | Men's freestyle | | Men's Greco-Roman | | Women's freestyle | |
| Rank | Team | Points | Team | Points | Team | Points |
|---|---|---|---|---|---|---|
| 1 | Azerbaijan | 140 | Turkey | 127 | Ukraine | 159 |
| 2 | Turkey | 129 | Ukraine | 126 | Turkey | 129 |
| 3 | Georgia | 125 | Georgia | 125 | Romania | 123 |
| 4 | Armenia | 123 | Azerbaijan | 123 | France | 92 |
| 5 | Ukraine | 96 | Armenia | 105 | Azerbaijan | 78 |
| 6 | France | 89 | Finland | 64 | Italy | 77 |
| 7 | Moldova | 85 | Hungary | 63 | Hungary | 71 |
| 8 | Germany | 78 | Moldova | 62 | Germany | 64 |
| 9 | Romania | 67 | Romania | 51 | Poland | 57 |
| 10 | Bulgaria | 55 | Poland | 48 | Sweden | 46 |

== Medal overview ==
=== Men's freestyle ===
| Event | Gold | Silver | Bronze |
|---|---|---|---|
| 57 kg | Niklas Stechele; Germany | Tolga Özbek; Turkey | Edik Harutyunyan; Armenia |
| 57 kg | Niklas Stechele; Germany | Tolga Özbek; Turkey | Luka Gvinjilia; Georgia |
| 61 kg | Andrii Dzhelep; Ukraine | Mezhlum Mezhlumyan; Armenia | Simone Piroddu; Italy |
| 61 kg | Andrii Dzhelep; Ukraine | Mezhlum Mezhlumyan; Armenia | Emre Kural; Turkey |
| 65 kg | Khamzat Arsamerzouev; France | Rashid Babazade; Azerbaijan | Mykyta Honcharov; Ukraine |
| 65 kg | Khamzat Arsamerzouev; France | Rashid Babazade; Azerbaijan | Goga Otinashvili; Georgia |
| 70 kg | Magomed Khaniev; Azerbaijan | Hayk Papikyan; Armenia | Shamil Ustaev; Germany |
| 70 kg | Magomed Khaniev; Azerbaijan | Hayk Papikyan; Armenia | Davit Patsinashvili; Georgia |
| 74 kg | Turan Bayramov; Azerbaijan | Vasile Diacon; Moldova | Krisztian Biro; Romania |
| 74 kg | Turan Bayramov; Azerbaijan | Vasile Diacon; Moldova | Giorgi Gogritchiani; Georgia |
| 79 kg | Georgios Kougioumtsidis; Greece | Vladimeri Gamkrelidze; Georgia | Eugeniu Mihalcean; Moldova |
| 79 kg | Georgios Kougioumtsidis; Greece | Vladimeri Gamkrelidze; Georgia | Sabuhi Amiraslanov; Azerbaijan |
| 86 kg | Rakhim Magamadov; France | Knyaz Iboyan; Armenia | İsmail Küçüksolak; Turkey |
| 86 kg | Rakhim Magamadov; France | Knyaz Iboyan; Armenia | Joshua Morodion; Germany |
| 92 kg | Andro Margishvili; Georgia | Muhammet Gimri; Turkey | Sergey Sargsyan; Armenia |
| 92 kg | Andro Margishvili; Georgia | Muhammet Gimri; Turkey | Adlan Viskhanov; France |
| 97 kg | Islam Ilyasov; Azerbaijan | Oktay Çifçi; Turkey | Radu Lefter; Moldova |
| 97 kg | Islam Ilyasov; Azerbaijan | Oktay Çifçi; Turkey | Ertuğrul Ağca; Germany |
| 125 kg | Georgi Ivanov; Bulgaria | Volodymyr Kochanov; Ukraine | Efe Anıl Al; Turkey |
| 125 kg | Georgi Ivanov; Bulgaria | Volodymyr Kochanov; Ukraine | Martin Simonyan; Armenia |

=== Men's Greco-Roman ===
| Event | Gold | Silver | Bronze |
|---|---|---|---|
| 55 kg | Denis Mihai; Romania | Karapet Manvelyan; Armenia | Eduard Strilchuk; Ukraine |
| 55 kg | Denis Mihai; Romania | Karapet Manvelyan; Armenia | Muhammet Emin Çakır; Turkey |
| 60 kg | Elmir Aliyev; Azerbaijan | Melkamu Fetene; Israel | Vladyslav Kuzko; Ukraine |
| 60 kg | Elmir Aliyev; Azerbaijan | Melkamu Fetene; Israel | Mert İlbars; Turkey |
| 63 kg | Tino Ojala; Finland | Giorgi Shotadze; Georgia | Mairbek Salimov; Poland |
| 63 kg | Tino Ojala; Finland | Giorgi Shotadze; Georgia | Vitalie Eriomenco; Moldova |
| 67 kg | Diego Chkhikvadze; Georgia | Mustafa Safa Yıldırım; Turkey | Shon Nadorgin; Israel |
| 67 kg | Diego Chkhikvadze; Georgia | Mustafa Safa Yıldırım; Turkey | Ivo Iliev; Bulgaria |
| 72 kg | Gurban Gurbanov; Azerbaijan | Irfan Mirzoiev; Ukraine | Abdullah Toprak; Turkey |
| 72 kg | Gurban Gurbanov; Azerbaijan | Irfan Mirzoiev; Ukraine | Giorgi Chkhikvadze; Georgia |
| 77 kg | Alexandrin Guțu; Moldova | Khasay Hasanli; Azerbaijan | Mykyta Politaiev; Ukraine |
| 77 kg | Alexandrin Guțu; Moldova | Khasay Hasanli; Azerbaijan | Deni Nakaev; Germany |
| 82 kg | Jonni Sarkkinen; Finland | Exauce Mukubu; Norway | Saba Mamaladze; Georgia |
| 82 kg | Jonni Sarkkinen; Finland | Exauce Mukubu; Norway | Adam Gardzioła; Poland |
| 87 kg | Dávid Losonczi; Hungary | Turpal Bisultanov; Denmark | Hovhannes Harutyunyan; Armenia |
| 87 kg | Dávid Losonczi; Hungary | Turpal Bisultanov; Denmark | Muhittin Sarıçiçek; Turkey |
| 97 kg | Murad Ahmadiyev; Azerbaijan | Alex Szőke; Hungary | Hayk Khloyan; Armenia |
| 97 kg | Murad Ahmadiyev; Azerbaijan | Alex Szőke; Hungary | Lucas Lazogianis; Germany |
| 130 kg | Mykhailo Vyshnyvetskyi; Ukraine | Giorgi Tsopurashvili; Georgia | Hamza Bakır; Turkey |
| 130 kg | Mykhailo Vyshnyvetskyi; Ukraine | Giorgi Tsopurashvili; Georgia | Albert Vardanyan; Armenia |

=== Women's freestyle ===
| Event | Gold | Silver | Bronze |
|---|---|---|---|
| 50 kg | Emma Luttenauer; France | Emanuela Liuzzi; Italy | Zehra Demirhan; Turkey |
| 50 kg | Emma Luttenauer; France | Emanuela Liuzzi; Italy | Ana Maria Pîrvu; Romania |
| 53 kg | Zeynep Yetgil; Turkey | Liliia Malanchuk; Ukraine | Anastasia Blayvas; Germany |
| 53 kg | Zeynep Yetgil; Turkey | Liliia Malanchuk; Ukraine | Mariana Drăguțan; Moldova |
| 55 kg | Jonna Malmgren; Sweden | Andreea Ana; Romania | Mariia Vynnyk; Ukraine |
| 55 kg | Jonna Malmgren; Sweden | Andreea Ana; Romania | Elnura Mammadova; Azerbaijan |
| 57 kg | Anna Szél; Hungary | Oleksandra Khomenets; Ukraine | Zhala Aliyeva; Azerbaijan |
| 57 kg | Anna Szél; Hungary | Oleksandra Khomenets; Ukraine | Naemi Leistner; Germany |
| 59 kg | Solomiia Vynnyk; Ukraine | Amel Rebiha; France | Ana Maria Puiu; Romania |
| 59 kg | Solomiia Vynnyk; Ukraine | Amel Rebiha; France | Ebru Dağbaşı; Turkey |
| 62 kg | Iryna Bondar; Ukraine | Améline Douarre; France | Elena Esposito; Italy |
| 62 kg | Iryna Bondar; Ukraine | Améline Douarre; France | Viktoria Vesso; Estonia |
| 65 kg | Amina Capezan; Romania | Birgul Soltanova; Azerbaijan | Elma Zeidlere; Latvia |
| 65 kg | Amina Capezan; Romania | Birgul Soltanova; Azerbaijan | Iris Thiébaux; France |
| 68 kg | Nesrin Baş; Turkey | Zsuzsanna Molnár; Slovakia | Karolina Pók; Hungary |
| 68 kg | Nesrin Baş; Turkey | Zsuzsanna Molnár; Slovakia | Irina Rîngaci; Moldova |
| 72 kg | Wiktoria Chołuj; Poland | Iryna Zablotska; Ukraine | Tindra Sjöberg; Sweden |
| 72 kg | Wiktoria Chołuj; Poland | Iryna Zablotska; Ukraine | Noémi Szabados; Hungary |
| 76 kg | Anastasiya Alpyeyeva; Ukraine | Kamilė Gaučaitė; Lithuania | Mehtap Gültekin; Turkey |
| 76 kg | Anastasiya Alpyeyeva; Ukraine | Kamilė Gaučaitė; Lithuania | Fani Nađ; Serbia |

== Participating nations ==
367 wrestlers from 33 countries participated:

1. Albania (1)
2. Armenia (20)
3. Austria (2)
4. Azerbaijan (26)
5. Bulgaria (25)
6. Croatia (5)
7. Czech Republic (5)
8. Denmark (2)
9. Spain (4)
10. Estonia (3)
11. Finland (5)
12. France (14)
13. Georgia (20)
14. Germany (17)
15. Greece (11)
16. Hungary (13)
17. Israel (6)
18. Italy (12)
19. Kosovo (1)
20. Latvia (2)
21. Lithuania (9)
22. Moldova (21)
23. North Macedonia (5)
24. Norway (3)
25. Poland (20)
26. Romania (30)
27. Serbia (7)
28. Switzerland (4)
29. Slovakia (4)
30. Sweden (9)
31. Turkey (30)
32. Ukraine (30)
33. United Kingdom (1)

== Results ==
Legend

- C — Won by 3 cautions given to the opponent
- DSQ — Disqualified
- F — Won by fall
- R — Retired
- WO — Won by walkover

=== Men's freestyle ===
==== Men's freestyle 57 kg ====
Main bracket

Round of 16
Rafał Szewc (POL) | 3
Tolga Özbek (TUR) | 7
Vladyslav Abramov (UKR) | 2
Luka Gvinjilia (GEO) | 4
Thomas Epp (SUI) | 9
Andrei Bărbulescu (ROU) | 8

Quarterfinals
Edik Harutyunyan (ARM) | 2
Tolga Özbek (TUR) | 3
Nuraddin Novruzov (AZE) | 12
Ghennadi Diuvenji (MDA) | 2
Ivaylo Tisov (BUL) | 0
Luka Gvinjilia (GEO) | 10
Thomas Epp (SUI) | 0
Niklas Stechele (GER) | 11

Semifinals
Tolga Özbek (TUR) | 5
Nuraddin Novruzov (AZE) | 4
Luka Gvinjilia (GEO) | 0
Niklas Stechele (GER) | 8

Final
Tolga Özbek (TUR) | 2
Niklas Stechele (GER) | 4

Repechage round
Rafał Szewc (POL) | 0
Edik Harutyunyan (ARM) | 8^{F}

Bronze medal match
Edik Harutyunyan (ARM) | 13
Nuraddin Novruzov (AZE) | 2
Thomas Epp (SUI) | 0
Luka Gvinjilia (GEO) | 5

==== Men's freestyle 61 kg ====
Main bracket

Round of 16
Adam Biboulatov (FRA) | 0
Mezhlum Mezhlumyan (ARM) | 10
Emre Kural (TUR) | 6
Andrei Vitan (MDA) | 0
Daviti Abdaladze (GEO) | 1
Andrii Dzhelep (UKR) | 4

Quarterfinals
Daniel Ritter (ROU) | 0
Mezhlum Mezhlumyan (ARM) | 10
Simone Piroddu (ITA) | 10
Arben Sejdi (MKD) | 0
Aykhan Abdullazada (AZE) | 3
Emre Kural (TUR) | 9
Andrii Dzhelep (UKR) | 11
Stilyan Iliev (BUL) | 0

Semifinals
Mezhlum Mezhlumyan (ARM) | 6
Simone Piroddu (ITA) | 5
Emre Kural (TUR) | 6
Andrii Dzhelep (UKR) | 8

Final
Mezhlum Mezhlumyan (ARM) | 0
Andrii Dzhelep (UKR) | 10

Repechage round
Adam Biboulatov (FRA) | 8
Daniel Ritter (ROU) | 5
Daviti Abdaladze (GEO) | 4
Stilyan Iliev (BUL) | 3

Bronze medal match
Adam Biboulatov (FRA) | 3
Simone Piroddu (ITA) | 9
Daviti Abdaladze (GEO) | 5
Emre Kural (TUR) | 11

==== Men's freestyle 65 kg ====
Main bracket

Round of 16
Nico Megerle (GER) | 6
Dominik Laritz (SUI) | 2
Khamzat Arsamerzouev (FRA) | 10
Bozhidar Dzhorov (BUL) | 0
Veniamin Borzin (MDA) | 2
Rashid Babazade (AZE) | 11
Hamza Zopalı (TUR) | 2^{F}
Marian Sandu (ROU) | 1

Quarterfinals
Mykyta Honcharov (UKR) | 3
Nico Megerle (GER) | 2
Khamzat Arsamerzouev (FRA) | 10
Aminjon Sadulloev (POL) | 0
Goga Otinashvili (GEO) | 6
Rashid Babazade (AZE) | 7
Hamza Zopalı (TUR) | 8^{F}
Tigran Ghazaryan (ARM) | 5

Semifinals
Mykyta Honcharov (UKR) | 0
Khamzat Arsamerzouev (FRA) | 10
Rashid Babazade (AZE) | 11
Hamza Zopalı (TUR) | 8

Final
Khamzat Arsamerzouev (FRA) | WO
Rashid Babazade (AZE)

Repechage round
Bozhidar Dzhorov (BUL) | WO
~~Aminjon Sadulloev (POL)~~
Veniamin Borzin (MDA) | 3
Goga Otinashvili (GEO) | 5

Bronze medal match
Bozhidar Dzhorov (BUL) | 0
Mykyta Honcharov (UKR) | 6
Goga Otinashvili (GEO) | 12^{F}
Hamza Zopalı (TUR) | 6

==== Men's freestyle 70 kg ====
Main bracket

Round of 16
Mateusz Łuszczyński (POL) | 0
Hayk Papikyan (ARM) | 10
Moukhammad Sangariev (FRA) | 10
Liran Benoguev (ISR) | 0
Egzon Xhoni (KOS) | 0
Pavel Graur (MDA) | 11
Ivan Stoyanov (BUL) | 5
Shamil Ustaev (GER) | 9
Narek Poghosyan (UKR) | 3
Magomed Khaniev (AZE) | 8
Muhamed Feruki (MKD) | 0
Benedikt Huber (AUT) | 6
Eduard Lenard (ROU) | 14
Shwe Win (SWE) | 4
Davit Patsinashvili (GEO) | 6
Burak Sinin (TUR) | 2

Quarterfinals
Hayk Papikyan (ARM) | 5
Moukhammad Sangariev (FRA) | 0
Pavel Graur (MDA) | 0
Shamil Ustaev (GER) | 10
Magomed Khaniev (AZE) | 11
Benedikt Huber (AUT) | 1
Eduard Lenard (ROU) | 0
Davit Patsinashvili (GEO) | 10

Semifinals
Hayk Papikyan (ARM) | 9
Shamil Ustaev (GER) | 0
Magomed Khaniev (AZE) | 7
Davit Patsinashvili (GEO) | 4

Final
Hayk Papikyan (ARM) | 0
Magomed Khaniev (AZE) | 10

Repechage round
Mateusz Łuszczyński (POL) | 4
Moukhammad Sangariev (FRA) | 14
~~Narek Poghosyan (UKR)~~
Benedikt Huber (AUT) | WO

Bronze medal match
Moukhammad Sangariev (FRA) | 2
Shamil Ustaev (GER) | 4
Benedikt Huber (AUT) | 0
Davit Patsinashvili (GEO) | 10

==== Men's freestyle 74 kg ====
Main bracket

Round of 16
Turan Bayramov (AZE) | 11
Nikolay Dimitrov (BUL) | 0
Bálint Balázs (HUN) | 3
Krisztian Biro (ROU) | 14
Vasile Diacon (MDA) | 12^{F}
Giorgi Gogritchiani (GEO) | 1
Raul Caso (ITA) | 1
İsmet Çiftçi (TUR) | 4

Quarterfinals
Magamed Deliev (FRA) | 0
Turan Bayramov (AZE) | 11
Krisztian Biro (ROU) | 11^{F}
Mykyta Morhun (UKR) | 3
Menua Yaribekyan (ARM) | 2
Vasile Diacon (MDA) | 9
İsmet Çiftçi (TUR) | 2
Szymon Wojtkowski (POL) | 6

Semifinals
Turan Bayramov (AZE) | 10
Krisztian Biro (ROU) | 0
Vasile Diacon (MDA) | 11
Szymon Wojtkowski (POL) | 0

Final
Turan Bayramov (AZE) | 1
Vasile Diacon (MDA) | 1

Repechage round
Nikolay Dimitrov (BUL) | 5
Magamed Deliev (FRA) | 3
Giorgi Gogritchiani (GEO) | 10
Menua Yaribekyan (ARM) | 0

Bronze medal match
Nikolay Dimitrov (BUL) | 0
Krisztian Biro (ROU) | 10
Giorgi Gogritchiani (GEO) | 10
Szymon Wojtkowski (POL) | 0

==== Men's freestyle 79 kg ====
Main bracket

Round of 16
Vladimeri Gamkrelidze (GEO) | 10
Marian Subțirică (ROU) | 0
Vladyslav Bodoriak (UKR) | 3
Okan Tahtacı (TUR) | 14
Radomir Stoyanov (BUL) | 10
Mateusz Pędzicki (POL) | 13^{F}
Gabriel Iglesias (ESP) | 0
Narek Grigoryan (ARM) | 4

Quarterfinals
Max Kasperovich (ISR) | 1
Vladimeri Gamkrelidze (GEO) | 11
Okan Tahtacı (TUR) | 5
Eugeniu Mihalcean (MDA) | 10
Sabuhi Amiraslanov (AZE) | 10
Mateusz Pędzicki (POL) | 0
Narek Grigoryan (ARM) | 4
Georgios Kougioumtsidis (GRE) | 14

Semifinals
Vladimeri Gamkrelidze (GEO) | 5
Eugeniu Mihalcean (MDA) | 1
Sabuhi Amiraslanov (AZE) | 2
Georgios Kougioumtsidis (GRE) | 5

Final
Vladimeri Gamkrelidze (GEO) | 4
Georgios Kougioumtsidis (GRE) | 6

Repechage round
Marian Subțirică (ROU) | 13
Max Kasperovich (ISR) | 8

Bronze medal match
Marian Subțirică (ROU) | 3
Eugeniu Mihalcean (MDA) | 6^{F}
Narek Grigoryan (ARM) | 1
Sabuhi Amiraslanov (AZE) | 4

==== Men's freestyle 86 kg ====
Main bracket

Round of 16
Knyaz Iboyan (ARM) | 4
Ivan Ichizli (MDA) | 2
İsmail Küçüksolak (TUR) | 6
Daviti Koguashvili (GEO) | 6
Akhmedkhan Tembotov (ITA) | 5
Benjamin Greil (AUT) | 1
Denis Chirică (ROU) | 0
Angelos Kouklaris (GRE) | 7
Joshua Morodion (GER) | 10
Adam Modosjan (MKD) | 0
Rakhim Magamadov (FRA) | 10
Vladyslav Prus (UKR) | 0

Quarterfinals
Farid Jabbarov (AZE) | 5
Knyaz Iboyan (ARM) | 7
İsmail Küçüksolak (TUR) | 6
Akhmedkhan Tembotov (ITA) | 1
Angelos Kouklaris (GRE) | 2
Joshua Morodion (GER) | 3
Rakhim Magamadov (FRA) | 8
Ilia Hristov (BUL) | 2

Semifinals
Knyaz Iboyan (ARM) | 3
İsmail Küçüksolak (TUR) | 2
Joshua Morodion (GER) | 0
Rakhim Magamadov (FRA) | 11

Final
Knyaz Iboyan (ARM) | 1
Rakhim Magamadov (FRA) | 11

Repechage round
Ivan Ichizli (MDA) | 6
Farid Jabbarov (AZE) | 3
Vladyslav Prus (UKR) | 10
Ilia Hristov (BUL) | 0

Bronze medal match
Ivan Ichizli (MDA) | 6
İsmail Küçüksolak (TUR) | 7
Vladyslav Prus (UKR) | 2
Joshua Morodion (GER) | 4^{F}

==== Men's freestyle 92 kg ====
Main bracket

Round of 16
Redjep Hajdari (MKD) | 5^{F}
Ion Demian (MDA) | 4
Sergey Sargsyan (ARM) | 6
Andro Margishvili (GEO) | 17
Sali Saliev (BUL) | 0
Roman Rychko (UKR) | 12^{F}
Muhammet Gimri (TUR) | 3
Adlan Viskhanov (FRA) | 1

Quarterfinals
Abduljalil Shabanov (AZE) | 7
Redjep Hajdari (MKD) | 5
Andro Margishvili (GEO) | 10
Farhad Anosheh (SWE) | 0
Alexandru Beșliu (ROU) | 1
Roman Rychko (UKR) | 11
Muhammet Gimri (TUR) | 8
Gkivi Bliatze (GRE) | 3

Semifinals
Abduljalil Shabanov (AZE) | 13
Andro Margishvili (GEO) | 23
Roman Rychko (UKR) | 0
Muhammet Gimri (TUR) | 3

Final
Andro Margishvili (GEO) | 7
Muhammet Gimri (TUR) | 1

Repechage round
Sergey Sargsyan (ARM) | 7
Farhad Anosheh (SWE) | 0
Adlan Viskhanov (FRA) | 3^{F}
Gkivi Bliatze (GRE) | 2

Bronze medal match
Sergey Sargsyan (ARM) | 8
Abduljalil Shabanov (AZE) | 5
Adlan Viskhanov (FRA) | 9
Roman Rychko (UKR) | 1

==== Men's freestyle 97 kg ====
Main bracket

Round of 16
Khachatur Khachatryan (ARM) | 1
Radu Lefter (MDA) | 6
Ertuğrul Ağca (GER) | 0
Islam Ilyasov (AZE) | 5

Quarterfinals
Oktay Çifçi (TUR) | 11
Radu Lefter (MDA) | 1
David Mchedlidze (UKR) | 5
Merab Suleimanishvili (GEO) | 4
Florin Tripon (ROU) | 2
Richard Végh (HUN) | 9
Islam Ilyasov (AZE) | 6
Kolyo Dimitrov (BUL) | 0

Semifinals
Oktay Çifçi (TUR) | 5
David Mchedlidze (UKR) | 2
Richard Végh (HUN) | 0
Islam Ilyasov (AZE) | 6

Final
Oktay Çifçi (TUR) | 1
Islam Ilyasov (AZE) | 6

Repechage round
Ertuğrul Ağca (GER) | 10
Kolyo Dimitrov (BUL) | 0

Bronze medal match
Radu Lefter (MDA) | 3
David Mchedlidze (UKR) | 2
Ertuğrul Ağca (GER) | 10
Richard Végh (HUN) | 0

==== Men's freestyle 125 kg ====
- In the match between Solomon Manashvili of Georgia and Vakhit Galayev of Azerbaijan, the referees showed red cards to both wrestlers and disqualified them after a fight broke out after the end of the match. Quarterfinal losers Volodymyr Kochanov of Ukraine and Martin Simonyan of Armenia played a semifinal match again.

Main bracket

Round of 16
Efe Anıl Al (TUR) | 4
Nicolae Stratulat (MDA) | 3
Solomon Manashvili (GEO) | 11
Jakub Czerczak (POL) | 0
Uvejs Fejzullahu (MKD) | 0
Vakhit Galayev (AZE) | 10

Quarterfinals
Florin Dreve (ROU) | 0
Efe Anıl Al (TUR) | 10
Georgi Ivanov (BUL) | 6
Azamat Khosonov (GRE) | 0
Volodymyr Kochanov (UKR) | 1
Solomon Manashvili (GEO) | 9
Vakhit Galayev (AZE) | 10
Martin Simonyan (ARM) | 3

Semifinals
Efe Anıl Al (TUR) | 2
Georgi Ivanov (BUL) | 6
~~Solomon Manashvili (GEO)~~ | 5^{DSQ}
~~Vakhit Galayev (AZE)~~ | 2^{DSQ}

Final
Georgi Ivanov (BUL) | 10
Volodymyr Kochanov (UKR) | 0

| Semifinal (Additional) |
| Volodymyr Kochanov (UKR) | 10 |
| Martin Simonyan (ARM) | 0 |

Bronze medal match
Azamat Khosonov (GRE) | 3
Efe Anıl Al (TUR) | 6
~~Solomon Manashvili (GEO)~~
Martin Simonyan (ARM) | WO

=== Men's Greco-Roman ===
==== Men's Greco-Roman 55 kg ====
Main bracket

Round of 16
Amare Fetene (ISR) | 1
Ilias Zairakis (GRE) | 9
Karapet Manvelyan (ARM) | 9
Sabolč Lošonc (SRB) | 0

Quarterfinals
Eduard Strilchuk (UKR) | 8
Ilias Zairakis (GRE) | 0
Leonid Moroz (MDA) | 0
Denis Mihai (ROU) | 8
Giorgi Tokhadze (GEO) | 13
Muhammet Emin Çakır (TUR) | 16
Karapet Manvelyan (ARM) | 7
~~Rahim Hasanov (AZE)~~ | 1^{DSQ}

Semifinals
Eduard Strilchuk (UKR) | 0
Denis Mihai (ROU) | 3
Muhammet Emin Çakır (TUR) | 1
Karapet Manvelyan (ARM) | 1

Final
Denis Mihai (ROU) | 7
Karapet Manvelyan (ARM) | 3

Repechage round 1
Sabolč Lošonc (SRB) | WO
~~Rahim Hasanov (AZE)~~

Bronze medal match
Leonid Moroz (MDA) | 3
Eduard Strilchuk (UKR) | 8
Sabolc Losonc (SRB) | 0
Muhammet Emin Çakır (TUR) | 9

==== Men's Greco-Roman 60 kg ====
Main bracket

Round of 16
Aser Ebro (ESP) | 0
Suren Aghajanyan (ARM) | 8

Quarterfinals
Vladyslav Kuzko (UKR) | 6
Suren Aghajanyan (ARM) | 4
Georgios Scarpello (GER) | 0
Melkamu Fetene (ISR) | 7
Adrian Anton (ROU) | 0
Dimitri Khachidze (GEO) | 9
Elmir Aliyev (AZE) | 6
Mert İlbars (TUR) | 5

Semifinals
Vladyslav Kuzko (UKR) | 4
Melkamu Fetene (ISR) | 5
Dimitri Khachidze (GEO) | 1
Elmir Aliyev (AZE) | 7

Final
Melkamu Fetene (ISR) | 3
Elmir Aliyev (AZE) | 5

Bronze medal match
Georgios Scarpello (GER) | 1
Vladyslav Kuzko (UKR) | 7
Mert İlbars (TUR) | 10
Dimitri Khachidze (GEO) | 0

==== Men's Greco-Roman 63 kg ====
Main bracket

Round of 16
Petru Alexe (ROU) | 0
Mairbek Salimov (POL) | 10
Ziya Babashov (AZE) | 1
Sahak Hovhannisyan (ARM) | 3
Abere Fetene (ISR) | 0
Andrii Semenchuk (UKR) | 4^{F}
Tino Ojala (FIN) | 9
Ioannis Petkos (GRE) | 0

Quarterfinals
Giorgi Shotadze (GEO) | 9
Mairbek Salimov (POL) | 0
Sahak Hovhannisyan (ARM) | 1
İsmail Çulfa (TUR) | 6
Miroslav Emilov (BUL) | 0
Andrii Semenchuk (UKR) | 8
Tino Ojala (FIN) | 6
Vitalie Eriomenco (MDA) | 6

Semifinals
Giorgi Shotadze (GEO) | 6
İsmail Çulfa (TUR) | 3
Andrii Semenchuk (UKR) | 5
Tino Ojala (FIN) | 7

Final
Giorgi Shotadze (GEO) | 4
Tino Ojala (FIN) | 5

Repechage round
Ioannis Petkos (GRE) | 1
Vitalie Eriomenco (MDA) | 2^{F}

Bronze medal match
İsmail Çulfa (TUR) | 2
Mairbek Salimov (POL) | 10
Vitalie Eriomenco (MDA) | 11
Andrii Semenchuk (UKR) | 0

==== Men's Greco-Roman 67 kg ====
Main bracket

Round of 16
Ashot Khachatryan (ARM) | 4
Yanis Nifri (FRA) | 2
Diego Chkhikvadze (GEO) | 7
Shon Nadorgin (ISR) | 0
Maksym Liu (UKR) | 9
Alexandr Gurali (MDA) | 1
Iosif Ionescu (ROU) | 3
Adomas Grigaliūnas (LTU) | 6
Michael Portmann (SUI) | 1
Hasan Mammadli (AZE) | 10

Quarterfinals
Aleksander Mielewczyk (POL) | 0
Ashot Khachatryan (ARM) | 10
Diego Chkhikvadze (GEO) | 9
Maksym Liu (UKR) | 0
Ivo Iliev (BUL) | 10
Adomas Grigaliūnas (LTU) | 0
Hasan Mammadli (AZE) | 2
Mustafa Safa Yıldırım (TUR) | 4

Semifinals
Ashot Khachatryan (ARM) | 0
Diego Chkhikvadze (GEO) | 11
Ivo Iliev (BUL) | 3
Mustafa Safa Yıldırım (TUR) | 8^{F}

Final
Diego Chkhikvadze (GEO) | 2
Mustafa Safa Yıldırım (TUR) | 1

Repechage round 1
Shon Nadorgin (ISR) | WO
Maksym Liu (UKR)

Bronze medal match
Shon Nadorgin (ISR) | 5
Ashot Khachatryan (ARM) | 5
Hasan Mammadli (AZE) | 8
Ivo Iliev (BUL) | 10

==== Men's Greco-Roman 72 kg ====
Final

| Final |
| Irfan Mirzoiev (UKR) | 0 |
| Gurban Gurbanov (AZE) | 8 |

Top half

Round of 32
Ilia Mustakov (BUL) | 2
Irfan Mirzoiev (UKR) | 9

Round of 16
Aaron Bellscheidt (GER) | 4
Giovanni Alessio (ITA) | 3
Irfan Mirzoiev (UKR) | 4^{F}
Abdullah Toprak (TUR) | 1
Kamil Czarnecki (POL) | 11
Maurus Zogg (SUI) | 2
Krisztofer Klányi (HUN) | 7
Vilius Savickas (LTU) | 4

Quarterfinals
Aaron Bellscheidt (GER) | 1
Irfan Mirzoiev (UKR) | 10
Kamil Czarnecki (POL) | 2
Krisztofer Klányi (HUN) | 6^{F}

Semifinals
Irfan Mirzoiev (UKR) | 5
Krisztofer Klányi (HUN) | 3

Bottom half

Round of 32
Luka Malobabić (CRO) | 0
Gurban Gurbanov (AZE) | 8

Round of 16
Giorgi Chkhikvadze (GEO) | 7
Júnior Benítez (ESP) | 2
Klodjan Shehu (ALB) | 0
Hayk Asatryan (ARM) | 9
Igor Botez (ROU) | 0
Gurban Gurbanov (AZE) | 6
Joni Komppa (FIN) | 11
Oliver Oláh (SVK) | 0

Quarterfinals
Giorgi Chkhikvadze (GEO) | 6
Hayk Asatryan (ARM) | 2
Gurban Gurbanov (AZE) | 4
Joni Komppa (FIN) | 1

Semifinals
Giorgi Chkhikvadze (GEO) | 1
Gurban Gurbanov (AZE) | 1

Repechage round 1
Ilia Mustakov (BUL) | 2
Abdullah Toprak (TUR) | 10
Luka Malobabić (CRO)
Igor Botez (ROU) | WO

Repechage round 2
Abdullah Toprak (TUR) | 9
Aaron Bellscheidt (GER) | 1
Igor Botez (ROU) | 10
Joni Komppa (FIN) | 8

Bronze medal match
Abdullah Toprak (TUR) | 7
Krisztofer Klányi (HUN) | 0
Igor Botez (ROU) | 0
Giorgi Chkhikvadze (GEO) | 5

==== Men's Greco-Roman 77 kg ====
Main bracket

Round of 16
Şahan Acar (TUR) | 0
Khasay Hasanli (AZE) | 10
Aleksa Ilić (SRB) | 3
Mykyta Politaiev (UKR) | 6
Attila Tösmagi (HUN) | 7
Ashot Kirakosyan (ARM) | 3
Iulian Lungu (ROU) | 1
Khvicha Ananidze (GEO) | 7
Alexandrin Guțu (MDA) | 8
Michal Zelenka (CZE) | 2
Simon Borkenhagen (SWE) | 0
Deni Nakaev (GER) | 9

Quarterfinals
Aistis Liaugminas (LTU) | 0
Khasay Hasanli (AZE) | 9
Mykyta Politaiev (UKR) | 1
Attila Tösmagi (HUN) | 1
Khvicha Ananidze (GEO) | 0
Alexandrin Guțu (MDA) | 9
Deni Nakaev (GER) | 5
Konrad Kozłowski (POL) | 1

Semifinals
Khasay Hasanli (AZE) | 5
Mykyta Politaiev (UKR) | 1
Alexandrin Guțu (MDA) | 7
Deni Nakaev (GER) | 1

Final
Khasay Hasanli (AZE) | 3
Alexandrin Guțu (MDA) | 6

Repechage round
Şahan Acar (TUR) | 8
Aistis Liaugminas (LTU) | 0
Michal Zelenka (CZE) | 3
Khvicha Ananidze (GEO) | 5

Bronze medal match
Şahan Acar (TUR) | 2
Mykyta Politaiev (UKR) | 3
Khvicha Ananidze (GEO) | 1
Deni Nakaev (GER) | 9

==== Men's Greco-Roman 82 kg ====
Main bracket

Round of 16
Ivaylo Ivanov (BUL) | 1
Alperen Berber (TUR) | 9
Saba Mamaladze (GEO) | 11
Madamin Mirzoiev (UKR) | 2
Marcel Hein (DEN) | 1
Branko Kovačević (SRB) | 7
Jonni Sarkkinen (FIN) | 8
Semion Brekkeli (MDA) | 0
Vasile Cojoc (ROU) | 3
Ilias Pagkalidis (GRE) | 4
Péter Dömök (HUN) | 0
Karen Khachatryan (ARM) | 8
Ivo Švígler (CZE) | 0
Adam Gardzioła (POL) | 4^{F}
Ismail Rzayev (AZE) | 0
Exauce Mukubu (NOR) | 9

Quarterfinals
Alperen Berber (TUR) | 8
Saba Mamaladze (GEO) | 10
Branko Kovačević (SRB) | 3
Jonni Sarkkinen (FIN) | 5
Ilias Pagkalidis (GRE) | 4
Karen Khachatryan (ARM) | 3
Adam Gardzioła (POL) | 1
Exauce Mukubu (NOR) | 9

Semifinals
Saba Mamaladze (GEO) | 1
Jonni Sarkkinen (FIN) | 3
Ilias Pagkalidis (GRE) | 0
Exauce Mukubu (NOR) | 8

Final
Jonni Sarkkinen (FIN) | 6
Exauce Mukubu (NOR) | 0

Repechage round 1
Semion Brekkeli (MDA) | 3
Branko Kovačević (SRB) | 7
Ismail Rzayev (AZE) | 0
Adam Gardzioła (POL) | 9

Bronze medal match
Branko Kovačević (SRB) | 1
Saba Mamaladze (GEO) | 5
Adam Gardzioła (POL) | 2
Ilias Pagkalidis (GRE) | 2

==== Men's Greco-Roman 87 kg ====
Main bracket

Round of 16
Patrik Gordan (ROU) | 0
Turpal Bisultanov (DEN) | 8
Ondřej Havelka (CZE) | 0
Gabriel Lupașco (MDA) | 11
Nikolaos Iosifidis (GRE) | 0
Waltteri Latvala (FIN) | 10
Mahammad Ahmadiyev (AZE) | 4
Achiko Bolkvadze (GEO) | 5
Muhittin Sarıçiçek (TUR) | 8
Matej Mandić (CRO) | 0
Dávid Losonczi (HUN) | 8
Szymon Szymonowicz (POL) | 0
Ivan Manov (BUL) | 0
Mykyta Alieksieiev (UKR) | 8

Quarterfinals
Hovhannes Harutyunyan (ARM) | 0
Turpal Bisultanov (DEN) | 7
Gabriel Lupașco (MDA) | 4
Waltteri Latvala (FIN) | 1
Achiko Bolkvadze (GEO) | 0
Muhittin Sarıçiçek (TUR) | 6
Dávid Losonczi (HUN) | 11
Mykyta Alieksieiev (UKR) | 7

Semifinals
Turpal Bisultanov (DEN) | 9
Gabriel Lupașco (MDA) | 0
Muhittin Sarıçiçek (TUR) | 3
Dávid Losonczi (HUN) | 7

Final
Turpal Bisultanov (DEN) | 3
Dávid Losonczi (HUN) | 4

Repechage round
Patrik Gordan (ROU)
Hovhannes Harutyunyan (ARM) | WO
Szymon Szymonowicz (POL) | 9
Mykyta Alieksieiev (UKR) | 0

Bronze medal match
Hovhannes Harutyunyan (ARM) | 2^{F}
Gabriel Lupașco (MDA) | 4
Szymon Szymonowicz (POL) | 1
Muhittin Sarıçiçek (TUR) | 2

==== Men's Greco-Roman 97 kg ====
Final

| Final |
| Alex Szőke (HUN) | 1 |
| Murad Ahmadiyev (AZE) | 3^{F} |

Top half

Round of 32
Hayk Khloyan (ARM) | 2
Alex Szőke (HUN) | 3

Round of 16
Fatih Önvermez (TUR) | 1
Richard Karelson (EST) | 1
Alex Szőke (HUN) | 3
Jakub Antoszewski (POL) | 1
Lasha Tvildiani (GEO) | 1
Mindaugas Venckaitis (LTU) | 9
Kaloyan Dimov (BUL) | 1
Vinko Prodanović (CRO) | 4

Quarterfinals
Fatih Önvermez (TUR) | 0
Alex Szőke (HUN) | 4
Mindaugas Venckaitis (LTU) | 7
Vinko Prodanović (CRO) | 2

Semifinals
Alex Szőke (HUN) | 6
Mindaugas Venckaitis (LTU) | 0

Bottom half

Round of 32

Round of 16
Luka Katić (SRB) | 2
Murad Ahmadiyev (AZE) | 7
Oleksandr Yevdokimov (UKR) | 3
Ionuţ Goşa (ROU) | 1
Archontis Xouras (GRE) | 0
Måns Klostermann (SWE) | 8
Lucas Lazogianis (GER) | 3
Roman Balchivschii (MDA) | 1

Quarterfinals
Murad Ahmadiyev (AZE) | 5
Oleksandr Yevdokimov (UKR) | 2
Måns Klostermann (SWE) | 0
Lucas Lazogianis (GER) | 9

Semifinals
Murad Ahmadiyev (AZE) | 7
Lucas Lazogianis (GER) | 5

Repechage round 1
Hayk Khloyan (ARM) | 9
Jakub Antoszewski (POL) | 0

Repechage round 2
Hayk Khloyan (ARM) | 9
Fatih Önvermez (TUR) | 1
Luka Katić (SRB) | 2
Oleksandr Yevdokimov (UKR) | 8

Bronze medal match
Hayk Khloyan (ARM) | 6
Mindaugas Venckaitis (LTU) | 0
Oleksandr Yevdokimov (UKR) | 0
Lucas Lazogianis (GER) | 5

==== Men's Greco-Roman 130 kg ====
Main bracket

Round of 16
Mykhailo Vyshnyvetskyi (UKR) | 9
Sarkhan Mammadov (AZE) | 1

Quarterfinals
Gean Ali (ROU) | 0
Mykhailo Vyshnyvetskyi (UKR) | 4^{F}
Hamza Bakır (TUR) | 4
Nikolaos Ntounias (GRE) | 1
Marcel Albini (CZE) | 0
Giorgi Tsopurashvili (GEO) | 5
Dominik Krawczyk (POL) | 0
Albert Vardanyan (ARM) | 9

Semifinals
Mykhailo Vyshnyvetskyi (UKR) | 7^{F}
Hamza Bakır (TUR) | 3
Giorgi Tsopurashvili (GEO) | 6
Albert Vardanyan (ARM) | 0

Final
Mykhailo Vyshnyvetskyi (UKR) | 4
Giorgi Tsopurashvili (GEO) | 1

Repechage round
Sarkhan Mammadov (AZE) | 8
Gean Ali (ROU) | 0

Bronze medal match
Sarkhan Mammadov (AZE) | 0
Hamza Bakır (TUR) | 4
Marcel Albini (CZE) | 1
Albert Vardanyan (ARM) | 6

=== Women's freestyle ===
==== Women's freestyle 50 kg ====
Main bracket

Round of 16
Snizhana Onufriieva (UKR) | 0
Zehra Demirhan (TUR) | 10
Amanda Tomczyk (POL) | 2
Szimonetta Szekér (HUN) | 2
Emine Osman (BUL) | 0
Emma Luttenauer (FRA) | 10
Shahana Nazarova (AZE) | 10
Maria Leorda (MDA) | 0
Khrystyna Basych (SVK) | 1
Emanuela Liuzzi (ITA) | 5

Quarterfinals
Taru Vainionpää (FIN) | 0
Zehra Demirhan (TUR) | 3
Amanda Tomczyk (POL) | 1
Emma Luttenauer (FRA) | 2
Gabija Dilytė (LTU) | 4^{F}
Shahana Nazarova (AZE) | 10
Emanuela Liuzzi (ITA) | 3
Ana Maria Pîrvu (ROU) | 1

Semifinals
Zehra Demirhan (TUR) | 0
Emma Luttenauer (FRA) | 8
Gabija Dilytė (LTU) | 1
Emanuela Liuzzi (ITA) | 4

Final
Emma Luttenauer (FRA) | 5
Emanuela Liuzzi (ITA) | 4

Repechage round
Emine Osman (BUL) | 0
Amanda Tomczyk (POL) | 10
Khrystyna Basych (SVK) | 1
Ana Maria Pîrvu (ROU) | 4^{F}

Bronze medal match
Amanda Tomczyk (POL) | 1
Zehra Demirhan (TUR) | 6
Ana Maria Pîrvu (ROU) | 5^{F}
Gabija Dilytė (LTU) | 0

==== Women's freestyle 53 kg ====
Main bracket

Round of 16
Liliia Malanchuk (UKR) | 6^{F}
Mihaela Mihova (BUL) | 0
Mariana Drăguțan (MDA) | 0
Zeynep Yetgil (TUR) | 10

Quarterfinals
Anastasia Blayvas (GER) | 1
Liliia Malanchuk (UKR) | 6
Beatrice Ferenţ (ROU) | 10
Vestina Danisevičiūtė (LTU) | 0
Maria Ferone (ITA) | 0
Gultakin Shirinova (AZE) | 2^{F}
Zeynep Yetgil (TUR) | 10
Chadia Ayachi (FRA) | 0

Semifinals
Liliia Malanchuk (UKR) | 4^{F}
Beatrice Ferenţ (ROU) | 0
Gultakin Shirinova (AZE) | 0
Zeynep Yetgil (TUR) | 5^{F}

Final
Liliia Malanchuk (UKR) | 4
Zeynep Yetgil (TUR) | 9

Repechage round
Mihaela Mihova (BUL) | 0
Anastasia Blayvas (GER) | 4^{F}
Mariana Drăguțan (MDA) | 6^{F}
Chadia Ayachi (FRA) | 0

Bronze medal match
Anastasia Blayvas (GER) | 5
Beatrice Ferenţ (ROU) | 2
Mariana Drăguțan (MDA) | 10
Gultakin Shirinova (AZE) | 0

==== Women's freestyle 55 kg ====
Main bracket

Round of 16
Laurie Lesaffre (FRA) | 0
Andreea Ana (ROU) | 10^{F}
Erika Bognár (HUN) | 2
Mariia Vynnyk (UKR) | 6
Melda Dernekçi (TUR) | 2^{F}
Irena Binkova (BUL) | 4
Laura Stanelytė (LTU) | 0
Mihaela Samoil (MDA) | 10
Elnura Mammadova (AZE) | 12
Angelika Mytkowska (POL) | 1

Quarterfinals
Immacolata Danise (ITA) | 1
Andreea Ana (ROU) | 10^{F}
Mariia Vynnyk (UKR) | 11
Melda Dernekçi (TUR) | 9
Amory Andrich (GER) | 0
Mihaela Samoil (MDA) | 6
Elnura Mammadova (AZE) | 4
Jonna Malmgren (SWE) | 4^{F}

Semifinals
Andreea Ana (ROU) | 11
Mariia Vynnyk (UKR) | 1
Mihaela Samoil (MDA) | 0
Jonna Malmgren (SWE) | 4^{F}

Final
Andreea Ana (ROU) | 4
Jonna Malmgren (SWE) | 5

Repechage round
Laurie Lesaffre (FRA) | 0
Immacolata Danise (ITA) | 8

Bronze medal match
Immacolata Danise (ITA) | 0
Mariia Vynnyk (UKR) | 10
Elnura Mammadova (AZE) | 14
Mihaela Samoil (MDA) | 7

==== Women's freestyle 57 kg ====
Main bracket

Round of 16
Zhala Aliyeva (AZE) | 2
Oleksandra Khomenets (UKR) | 13
Anna Michalcová (CZE) | 4
Aurora Russo (ITA) | 6^{F}
Naemi Leistner (GER) | 4
Anna Szél (HUN) | 9
Nellie Florentin (SWE) | 1
Céleste Sion (FRA) | 5

Quarterfinals
Nazife Tair (BUL) | 0
Oleksandra Khomenets (UKR) | 10
Aurora Russo (ITA) | 4
Georgiana Lircă (ROU) | 1
Nazar Kaya (TUR) | 0
Anna Szél (HUN) | 10
Céleste Sion (FRA) | 4
Wiktoria Karwowska (POL) | 1

Semifinals
Oleksandra Khomenets (UKR) | 6
Aurora Russo (ITA) | 2
Anna Szél (HUN) | 7
Céleste Sion (FRA) | 1

Final
Oleksandra Khomenets (UKR) | 6
Anna Szél (HUN) | 6

Repechage round
Zhala Aliyeva (AZE) | 6^{F}
Nazife Tair (BUL) | 0
Naemi Leistner (GER) | 9
Nazar Kaya (TUR) | 0

Bronze medal match
Zhala Aliyeva (AZE) | 6
Aurora Russo (ITA) | 2
Naemi Leistner (GER) | 4
Céleste Sion (FRA) | 1

==== Women's freestyle 59 kg ====
Main bracket

Round of 16
Nikolett Szabó (HUN) | 6
Fatme Shaban (BUL) | 10^{F}
Amel Rebiha (FRA) | 10
Asia Craparotta (ITA) | 0
Solomiia Vynnyk (UKR) | 12
Othelie Høie (NOR) | 1
Gabrielė Dilytė (LTU) | 0
Ebru Dağbaşı (TUR) | 5

Quarterfinals
Kelsey Barnes (GBR) | 4
Fatme Shaban (BUL) | 6
Amel Rebiha (FRA) | 4^{F}
Ana Maria Puiu (ROU) | 4
Evelina Hulthén (SWE) | 0
Solomiia Vynnyk (UKR) | 12
Ebru Dağbaşı (TUR) | 10
Jovana Radivojević (SRB) | 2

Semifinals
Fatme Shaban (BUL) | 7
Amel Rebiha (FRA) | 8
Solomiia Vynnyk (UKR) | 10
Ebru Dağbaşı (TUR) | 1

Final
Amel Rebiha (FRA) | 0
Solomiia Vynnyk (UKR) | 7^{F}

Repechage round
Asia Craparotta (ITA) | 0
Ana Maria Puiu (ROU) | 6
Othelie Høie (NOR) | 9^{F}
Evelina Hulthén (SWE) | 0

Bronze medal match
Ana Maria Puiu (ROU) | 17
Fatme Shaban (BUL) | 10
Othelie Høie (NOR) | 1
Ebru Dağbaşı (TUR) | 4

==== Women's freestyle 62 kg ====
Main bracket

Round of 16
Améline Douarre (FRA) | 5
Elena Esposito (ITA) | 3
Viktoria Vesso (EST) | 9
Selvi İlyasoğlu (TUR) | 4

Quarterfinals
Alīna Antipova (LAT) | 0
Améline Douarre (FRA) | 7^{F}
Luisa Scheel (GER) | 10
Viktoria Ivanova (BUL) | 0
Gabriela Cuc (ROU) | 3
Paulina Danisz (POL) | 1
Viktoria Vesso (EST) | 6
Iryna Bondar (UKR) | 9

Semifinals
Améline Douarre (FRA) | 10
Luisa Scheel (GER) | 0
Gabriela Cuc (ROU) | 0
Iryna Bondar (UKR) | 10

Final
Améline Douarre (FRA) | 1
Iryna Bondar (UKR) | 5

Repechage round 1
Elena Esposito (ITA) | 4
Alīna Antipova (LAT) | 0^{R}

Bronze medal match
Elena Esposito (ITA) | 5
Luisa Scheel (GER) | 2
Viktoria Vesso (EST) | 4^{F}
Gabriela Cuc (ROU) | 0

==== Women's freestyle 65 kg ====
Main bracket

Round of 16
Maša Perović (SRB) | 0
Elma Zeidlere (LAT) | 10
Büşra Efe (TUR) | 8
Bianca Contrafatto (ITA) | 3
Nora Svensson (SWE) | 0
Amina Capezan (ROU) | 8
Iris Thiébaux (FRA) | 6
Gerda Barth (GER) | 3
Iva Gerić (CRO) | 1
Oksana Chudyk (UKR) | 11
Gergana Stoyanova (BUL) | 0
Birgul Soltanova (AZE) | 3

Quarterfinals
Olha Maslovská (SVK) | 1
Elma Zeidlere (LAT) | 3
Büşra Efe (TUR) | 0
Amina Capezan (ROU) | 4^{F}
Iris Thiébaux (FRA) | 3
Oksana Chudyk (UKR) | 0
Birgul Soltanova (AZE) | 8^{F}
Drosoula Tzianakopoulou (GRE) | 0

Semifinals
Elma Zeidlere (LAT) | 2
Amina Capezan (ROU) | 3
Iris Thiébaux (FRA) | 3
Birgul Soltanova (AZE) | 6

Final
Amina Capezan (ROU) | 6
Birgul Soltanova (AZE) | 5

Repechage round
Nora Svensson (SWE) | 2
Büşra Efe (TUR) | 8
Gergana Stoyanova (BUL) | 10
Drosoula Tzianakopoulou (GRE) | 0

Bronze medal match
Büşra Efe (TUR) | 3
Elma Zeidlere (LAT) | 4
Gergana Stoyanova (BUL) | 1
Iris Thiébaux (FRA) | 4

==== Women's freestyle 68 kg ====
Main bracket

Round of 16
Zsuzsanna Molnár (SVK) | 5^{F}
Nigar Mirzazada (AZE) | 4
Marta Ojeda (ESP) | 8^{F}
Siyka Ivanova (BUL) | 1
Irina Rîngaci (MDA) | 6^{F}
Sophia Schäfle (GER) | 0
Nesrin Baş (TUR) | 6^{F}
Laura Godino (ITA) | 0

Quarterfinals
Karolina Kozłowska (POL) | 1
Zsuzsanna Molnár (SVK) | 4^{F}
Marta Ojeda (ESP) | 0
Karolina Pók (HUN) | 4^{F}
Manola Skobelska (UKR) | 0
Irina Rîngaci (MDA) | 10
Nesrin Baş (TUR) | 10
Adina Irimia (ROU) | 0

Semifinals
Zsuzsanna Molnár (SVK) | 5
Karolina Pók (HUN) | 3
Irina Rîngaci (MDA) | 5
Nesrin Baş (TUR) | 9

Final
Zsuzsanna Molnár (SVK) | 0
Nesrin Baş (TUR) | 4

Repechage round
Nigar Mirzazada (AZE) | 4
Karolina Kozłowska (POL) | 2
Laura Godino (ITA) | 12
Adina Irimia (ROU) | 0

Bronze medal match
Nigar Mirzazada (AZE) | 2
Karolina Pók (HUN) | 10
Laura Godino (ITA) | 0
Irina Rîngaci (MDA) | 10

==== Women's freestyle 72 kg ====
Main bracket

Round of 16
Iryna Zablotska (UKR) | 11
Tindra Sjöberg (SWE) | 0

Quarterfinals
Milla Anđelić (CRO) | 0
Iryna Zablotska (UKR) | 11
Lilly Schneider (GER) | 9
Vanesa Georgieva (BUL) | 2
Wiktoria Chołuj (POL) | 11
Paula Rotaru (ROU) | 0
Nazar Batır (TUR) | 4
Noémi Szabados (HUN) | 6

Semifinals
Iryna Zablotska (UKR) | 6
Lilly Schneider (GER) | 2
Wiktoria Chołuj (POL) | 7
Noémi Szabados (HUN) | 0

Final
Iryna Zablotska (UKR) | 0
Wiktoria Chołuj (POL) | 11

Repechage round
Tindra Sjöberg (SWE) | 10
Milla Anđelić (CRO) | 0

Bronze medal match
Tindra Sjöberg (SWE) | 7^{F}
Lilly Schneider (GER) | 4
Paula Rotaru (ROU) | 0
Noémi Szabados (HUN) | 10

==== Women's freestyle 76 kg ====
Main bracket

| Quarterfinals | | Semifinals | | Final |
| Elena Margaș (ROU) | 0 |
| Kamilė Gaučaitė (LTU) | 5 | Kamilė Gaučaitė (LTU) | 5 |
| Mehtap Gültekin (TUR) | 3^{F} | Mehtap Gültekin (TUR) | 0 |
| Laura Kühn (GER) | 0 | | | Kamilė Gaučaitė (LTU) | 0 |
| Anastasiya Alpyeyeva (UKR) | 10 | | | Anastasiya Alpyeyeva (UKR) | 8^{F} |
| Fani Nađ (SRB) | 0 | Anastasiya Alpyeyeva (UKR) | 6^{F} |
| Marion Bye (NOR) | 8 | Marion Bye (NOR) | 0 |
| Marta Pajula (EST) | 2 |

Bronze medal match
Elena Margaș (ROU) | 2
Mehtap Gültekin (TUR) | 10
Fani Nađ (SRB) | 4
Marion Bye (NOR) | 3
