= Beytullah Kayışdağ =

Turkish Greco-Roman wrestler

Personal information
- Nationality: Turkish
- Born: 1 December 1999 (age 26) Yozgat, Turkey
- Height: 1.85 m (6 ft 1 in)
- Weight: 97 kg (214 lb)

Sport
- Country: Turkey
- Sport: Wrestling
- Greco-Roman: 97 kg
- Event: Greco-Roman - 97 kg
- Team: Ankara ASKI Spor Club
Medal record
Men's Greco-Roman wrestling
Representing Turkey
Islamic Solidarity Games
| Bronze medal – third place | 2021 Konya | 97 kg |
| Bronze medal – third place | 2025 Riyadh | 97 kg |
Vehbi Emre & Hamit Kaplan Tournament
| Silver medal – second place | 2025 Kocaeli | 97 kg |
| Bronze medal – third place | 2022 Istanbul | 97 kg |
| Bronze medal – third place | 2023 Istanbul | 97 kg |
World Juniors Championships
| Bronze medal – third place | 2019 Tallinn | 97 kg |
European Juniors Championships
| Bronze medal – third place | 2019 Pontevedra | 97 kg |

Beytullah Kayışdağ (born 1 December 1999) is a Turkish Greco-Roman wrestler competing in the 97 kg division of Greco-Roman wrestling. He is a member of the Ankara ASKI Spor Club.

== Career ==
Beytullah Kayışdağ, competing in Greco-Roman wrestling 97 kilograms category, won a bronze medal the 2019 World Junior Wrestling Championships, which was held in Estonian capital of Tallinn. Beytullah Kayışdağ drew 1-1 with Hungarian Aleks Szoke, was declared the winner of the match due to receiving the last point, became the third in the world and won the bronze medal.

In 2022, he won one of the bronze medals in his event at the Vehbi Emre & Hamit Kaplan Tournament held in Istanbul, Turkey. He competed in the 97 kg event at the European Wrestling Championships in Budapest, Hungary where he was eliminated in his second match. A few months later, he competed at the Matteo Pellicone Ranking Series 2022 held in Rome, Italy. He won one of the bronze medals in the men's Greco-Roman 97 kg event at the 2021 Islamic Solidarity Games held in Konya, Turkey.
