= Abdullah Toprak =

Turkish Greco-Roman wrestler (born 2000)

Personal information
- Born: 12 December 2000 (age 25) Kayseri, Turkey
- Height: 175 cm (5 ft 9 in)

Sport
- Country: Turkey
- Sport: Amateur wrestling
- Weight class: 72 kg
- Event: Greco-Roman
- Club: Kayseri Şeker
Medal record
Men's Greco-Roman wrestling
Representing Turkey
Vehbi Emre & Hamit Kaplan Tournament
Bronze medal – third place	2023 Istanbul	72 kg
European U23 Championship
Silver medal – second place	2022 Plovdiv	72 kg
Bronze medal – third place	2019 Novi Sad	63 kg
Bronze medal – third place	2023 Bucharest	72 kg
European Juniors Championships
Gold medal – first place	2019 Pontevedra	63 kg
World Cadets Championships
Bronze medal – third place	2016 Tbilisi	50 kg

Abdullah Toprak (born 12 December 2000) is a Turkish Greco-Roman wrestler competing in the 72 kg division. He is a member of Kayseri Şeker Club.

== Career ==
Abdullah Toprak won the gold medal in the Greco-Roman style 63 kg at the 2019 European Juniors Wrestling Championships in Spain. He won the gold medal by defeating his European champion opponent Georgian Leri Abuladze in the final with a good contest and 8–2.

Abdullah Toprak captured the silver medal in men's Greco-Roman 72 kg at 2022 European U23 Wrestling Championships.
