= Hamza Haloui =

Algerian Greco-Roman wrestler

Hemza Haloui
Personal information
- Nationality: Algerian
- Born: 10 July 1994 (age 32)
- Height: 180 cm (5 ft 11 in)
- Weight: 96 kg (212 lb)

Sport
- Sport: Wrestling
- Event: Greco-Roman
Medal record
Men's Greco-Roman wrestling
Representing Algeria
African Games
Silver medal – second place	2015 Brazzaville	-98 kg
- Updated on 24 August 2016

Hemza Haloui (born 10 July 1994) is an Algerian Greco-Roman wrestler. At the 2016 Summer Olympics he competed in the Men's Greco-Roman -98 kg.
