= Muhittin Sarıçiçek =

Turkish Greco-Roman wrestler

Personal information
- Born: 1 January 2000 (age 26) Sivas, Turkey
- Height: 180 cm (5 ft 11 in)
- Weight: 87 kg (192 lb; 13.7 st)

Sport
- Country: Turkey
- Sport: Amateur wrestling
- Weight class: 87 kg
- Event: Greco-Roman
- Club: İstanbul Büyükşehir Belediyesi S.K.
Medal record
Men's Greco-Roman wrestling
Representing Turkey
Grand Prix
Gold medal – first place	2022 Tunis	97 kg
Silver medal – second place	2023 Bucharest	87 kg
Bronze medal – third place	2022 Zagreb	87 kg
World Military Championships
Bronze medal – third place	2024 Yerevan	97 kg
European U23 Championship
Bronze medal – third place	2023 Bucharest	87 kg
World Juniors Championships
Bronze medal – third place	2018 Trnava	82 kg

Muhittin Sarıçiçek is a Turkish Greco-Roman wrestler competing in the 87 kg division. He is a member of İstanbul Büyükşehir Belediyesi S.K.

== Career ==
Muhittin Sarıçiçek captured bronze medal in men's Greco-Roman 87 kg at 2018 World Juniors Wrestling Championships.
