= Ayhan Karakuş =

Turkish wrestler (born 1989)

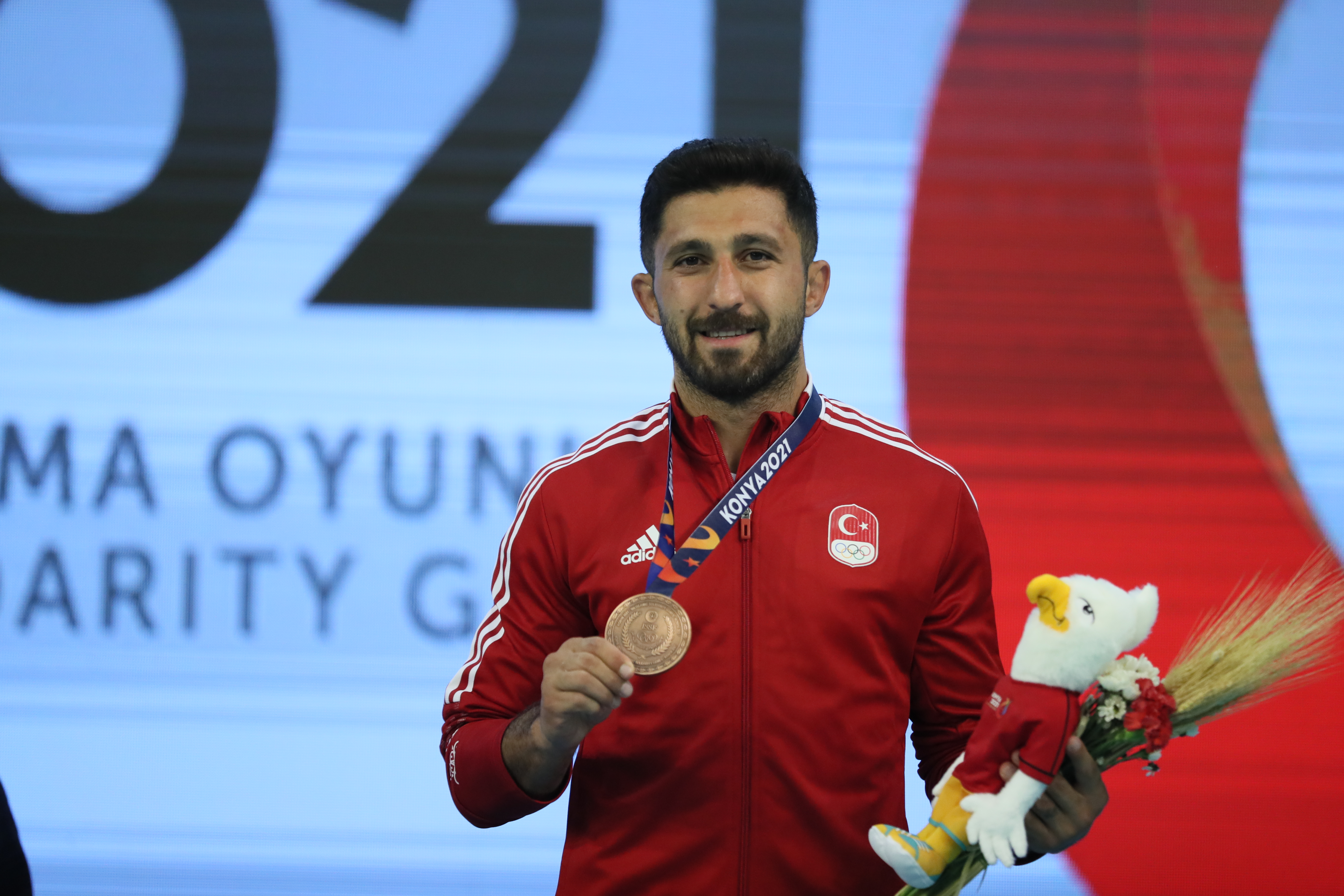

Personal information
- Nationality: Turkish
- Born: 13 October 1989 (age 36) Sivas, Turkey
- Height: 1.66 m (5 ft 5 in) (2012)
- Weight: 55 kg (121 lb) (2012)

Sport
- Sport: Sport wrestling
- Event: Greco-Roman
- Club: Kasımpaşaspor, Istanbul
- Coached by: İbrahim Yıldırım
Medal record
Men's Greco-Roman wrestling
Representing Turkey
Islamic Solidarity Games
Bronze medal – third place	2021 Konya	60 kg
World Military Championships
Bronze medal – third place	2023 Baku	63 kg
Vehbi Emre & Hamit Kaplan Tournament
Gold medal – first place	2011 Istanbul	55 kg
Golden Grand Prix
Gold medal – first place	2012 Szombathely	55 kg
Grand Prix
Gold medal – first place	2022 Tunis	60 kg
Bronze medal – third place	2022 Zagreb	60 kg
European Juniors Championships
Bronze medal – third place	2009 Tbilisi	55 kg
World University Championship
Bronze medal – third place	2016 Çorum	59 kg

Ayhan Karakuş (born 13 October 1989) is a Turkish wrestler competing in the 55 kg division of Greco-Roman style. The 1.66 m (5 ft 5 in) athlete is a member of Kasımpaşaspor Club in Istanbul, where he is coached by İbrahim Yıldırım.

His twin brother Erhan Karakuş is also a national wrestler in Greco-Roman style with international success.

Ayhan Karakuş qualified for the 2012 Summer Olympics and finished in 16th place.

He won one of the bronze medals in the men's Greco-Roman 60 kg event at the 2021 Islamic Solidarity Games held in Konya, Turkey.

== Achievements ==
Year	Competition	Venue	Position	Event	Notes
2009	European Junior Championships	Tbilisi, Georgia	3rd	55 kg	
2011	International Vehbi Emre Tournament	Istanbul, Turkey	1st	55 kg	
2012	FILA Greko-Romen Golden Grand Prix	Szombathely, Hungary	1st	55 kg	
2012	International Mariupol Tournament	Mariupol, Ukraine	2nd	55 kg	
