= Bo Bassett =

American wrestler (born 2006)

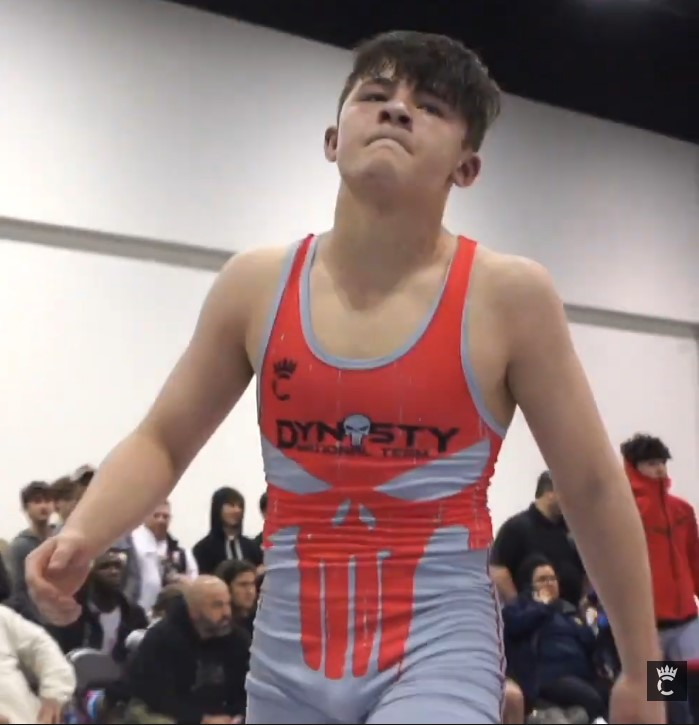
- Bassett in 2023

Personal information
- Full name: Bowen William Bassett
- Born: August 25, 2006 (age 20) Windber, Pennsylvania, U.S.
- Weight: 65 kg (143 lb)
- Website: hoo.be/bo.bassett

Sport
- Country: United States
- Sport: Wrestling
- Events: Folkstyle; Freestyle; Greco-roman (formerly)
- College team: Virginia Tech
- Club: Hokie Regional Training Center; Titan Mercury Wrestling Club; Young Guns Wrestling Club
- Coached by: Tony Robie; William Bassett (formerly)
Medal record
Men's freestyle wrestling
Representing the United States
World Championships
Gold medal – first place	2026 Astana	65 kg
US National Championships
Gold medal – first place	2026 Las Vegas	65 kg
Grand Prix
Gold medal – first place	2025 New York City	65 kg
U20 World Championships
Gold medal – first place	2026 Bratislava	65 kg
Bronze medal – third place	2024 Pontevedra	65 kg
U17 World Championships
Gold medal – first place	2021 Budapest	45 kg
Junior Pan American Games
Gold medal – first place	2025 Asunción	65 kg
U20 Pan American Championships
Gold medal – first place	2024 Lima	65 kg
Gold medal – first place	2026 Rio de Janeiro	65 kg
U17 Pan American Championships
Gold medal – first place	2021 Oaxtepec	45 kg
U20 US National Championships
Gold medal – first place	2024 Las Vegas	65 kg
Gold medal – first place	2026 Las Vegas	65 kg
Bronze medal – third place	2025 Las Vegas	65 kg
Men's Greco-Roman wrestling
Representing the United States
U17 Pan American Championships
Gold medal – first place	2021 Oaxtepec	45 kg

Bowen William Bassett (born August 25, 2006) is an American freestyle and folkstyle wrestler who competes at 65 kilograms. In freestyle, he is the reigning world champion, U20 world champion, and U.S. national champion.

By claiming the gold medal at the 2021 U17 World Championships, Bassett became the youngest world champion in history, at age 14. He is currently signed to the featherweight division of Real American Freestyle (RAF).

In folkstyle, Bassett is one of the most accomplished high school wrestlers of all time, and is currently a college freshman wrestling for the Virginia Tech Hokies.

== Early life ==
Bassett was born in Windber, Pennsylvania, the son of nurse Karissa (née Hamilton) and educator William Bassett. He started wrestling at age six.

He grew up a fan of Spencer Lee, and cites him as his inspiration for taking up wrestling. Bassett and Lee have trained together at the Young Guns Wrestling Club in Ebensburg, Pennsylvania.

Bassett initially attended Forest Hills Junior-Senior High School, where his father was the junior varsity wrestling coach before being fired in July 2020. After that incident, Bassett transferred to Bishop McCort High School, where his father was named head varsity wrestling coach.

== High school career ==
Bassett claimed the 2021 U17 World Championship gold medal at 45 kilograms in freestyle, the youngest world champion in history at 14 years old. He also claimed the 2021 U17 Pan American title earlier in the year.

Before his freshman year of high school, Bassett reclassified and attended eighth grade for a second time in the 2021–22 school year, which he would face backlash for during his high school career. That same year, his father was issued a two-year ban from coaching by the PIAA after an alleged violation of state recruiting policies. This ban also applied to the Bishop McCort wrestling program, as they were barred from competing in post-season tournaments for two seasons.

After going 18–0 as a freshman in 2022–23, Bassett was unable to compete in the PIAA post-season. Bassett would go on to amass an undefeated 170–0 record in high school, claiming PIAA Class AA state titles his sophomore, junior and senior seasons. At the national level, Bassett was a four-time winner of the Super 32 Challenge, the first ever to do so in the boy’s division, a four-time winner of the Walsh Jesuit Ironman, and a three-time winner of the Powerade Wrestling Tournament.

Bassett initially committed to the University of Iowa in February 2025, though he would later decommit in June 2025. He would then announce in October 2025 his commitment to Virginia Tech, along with his adopted brother and fellow top recruit Melvin Miller. Bassett graduated from high school in May 2026.

== Freestyle and collegiate career ==
=== Bishop McCort High School (freestyle) ===
==== 2024 ====
Since his sophomore year in high school, Bassett was active on the senior level in freestyle. In April, Bassett made his senior level debut and claimed a silver medal at the US Olympic Team Trials Last Chance Qualifier, notably defeating 2019 NCAA champion Anthony Ashnault in the semifinals, though failing to qualify for the US Olympic Team Trials. Later in the year, Bassett claimed the U20 Pan American title as well as a bronze medal at the U20 World Championships.

==== 2025 ====
In May, Bassett competed at the US World Team Trials, where after defeating three-time All-American Beau Bartlett, he fell to an also three-time All-American Brock Hardy and fellow U17 World champion Marcus Blaze. He was then unsuccessful in repeating as the US U20 World Team Member, taking second at the US U20 World Team Trials. However, he claimed a gold medal at the Junior Pan American Games held in Paraguay.

In November, Bassett claimed the Bill Farrell Memorial International title, most notably defeating Bartlett for a second time in the finals. A few weeks later, he pinned 2009 NCAA champion Darrion Caldwell in his Real American Freestyle debut at RAF 3.

==== 2026 ====
To start the year, Bassett beat YouTuber and NCAA Division II national qualifier Cayden Henschel at RAF 5 in January. In March, he defeated world and Olympic champion from Georgia Vladimer Khinchegashvili at RAF 7.

In April, Bassett became the U.S. national champion and qualified for Final X after claiming the gold medal at the US Open National Championships, notably defeating freshly crowned NCAA champion Aden Valencia, familiar foe Beau Bartlett, and two-time Pan American champion Joseph McKenna. That same weekend, Bassett also won the gold medal for the U20 division, earning a spot in the finals of the U.S. U20 World Team Trials.

=== Virginia Tech ===
==== 2026 ====
After graduating high school in May, Bassett won his two-out-of-three series for the US U20 World Team Trials at the end of the month. He was then set to compete in a two-out-of-three series against returning World medalist Real Woods for the US World Team spot, however, Woods requested a delay of the match due to a knee infection, with the series taking place in September.

In July, Bassett claimed his second U20 Pan American title. In August, he upgraded his bronze medal performance in 2024 into a gold medal performance at the 2026 U20 World Championships, becoming a two-time age-group world champion.

== Freestyle record ==
=== Senior ===
Senior Freestyle Matches
Res.	Record	Opponent	Score	Date	Event	Location
2026 World Championships (gold) at 65 kg
Win	24–3	(Armenia) Vazgen Tevanyan	9–1	October 29–30, 2026	2026 World Championships	Astana, Kazakhstan
Win	23–3	(Tajikistan) Abdulmazhid Kudiev	TF 12–2	October 29–30, 2026	2026 World Championships	Astana, Kazakhstan
Win	22–3	(Russia) Abasgadzhi Magomedov	14–13	October 29–30, 2026	2026 World Championships	Astana, Kazakhstan
Win	21–3	(France) Quentin Sticker	TF 12–0	October 29–30, 2026	2026 World Championships	Astana, Kazakhstan
Win	20–3	(Canada) Peiman Biabani	Fall	October 29–30, 2026	2026 World Championships	Astana, Kazakhstan
2026 US World Team Trials (gold) at 65 kg
Win	19-3	(United States) Real Woods	9-5	September 25, 2026	2026 Final X	(United States) Columbus, Ohio
Win	18-3	(United States) Real Woods	8-4	September 25, 2026	2026 Final X	(United States) Columbus, Ohio
2026 US Open Nationals (gold) at 65 kg
Win	17–3	(United States) Joseph McKenna	TF 10–0	April 24–25, 2026	2026 US Open National Championships	(United States) Las Vegas, Nevada
Win	16–3	(United States) Beau Bartlett	TF 10–0	April 24–25, 2026	2026 US Open National Championships	(United States) Las Vegas, Nevada
Win	15–3	(United States) Aden Valencia	11–10	April 24–25, 2026	2026 US Open National Championships	(United States) Las Vegas, Nevada
Win	14–3	(United States) Drew Gorman	Fall	April 24–25, 2026	2026 US Open National Championships	(United States) Las Vegas, Nevada
Win	13–3	(United States) Joey Buttler	Fall	April 24–25, 2026	2026 US Open National Championships	(United States) Las Vegas, Nevada
Win	12–3	(Georgia (country)) Vladimer Khinchegashvili	TF 13–3	March 28, 2026	RAF 07	(United States) Tampa, Florida
Win	11–3	(United States) Cayden Henschel	TF 14–4	January 10, 2026	RAF 05	(United States) Sunrise, Florida
Win	10–3	(United States) Darrion Caldwell	Fall	November 29, 2025	RAF 03	(United States) Chicago, Illinois
2025 Bill Farrell Memorial International (gold) at 65 kg
Win	9–3	(United States) Beau Bartlett	TF 15–5	November 9, 2025	2025 Bill Farrell Memorial International	(United States) New York City, New York
Win	8–3	(United States) Sam Latona	TF 11–0	November 9, 2025	2025 Bill Farrell Memorial International	(United States) New York City, New York
Win	7–3	(Uzbekistan) Boburjon Berdiyorov	Fall	November 9, 2025	2025 Bill Farrell Memorial International	(United States) New York City, New York
Win	6–3	(The Bahamas) Shannon Hanna II	TF 13–0	November 9, 2025	2025 Bill Farrell Memorial International	(United States) New York City, New York
2025 US World Team Trials DNP at 65 kg
Loss	5–3	(United States) Marcus Blaze	1–5	May 16–17, 2025	2025 US World Team Trials Challenge	(United States) Louisville, Kentucky
Loss	5–2	(United States) Brock Hardy	7–12	May 16–17, 2025	2025 US World Team Trials Challenge	(United States) Louisville, Kentucky
Win	5–1	(United States) Beau Bartlett	5–1	May 16–17, 2025	2025 US World Team Trials Challenge	(United States) Louisville, Kentucky
2024 US Olympic Trials Last Chance Qualifier (silver) at 65 kg
Loss	4–1	(United States) Matthew Kolodzik	TF 0–10	April 6–7, 2024	2024 US Olympic Trials Last Chance Qualifier	(United States) Fairfax, Virginia
Win	4–0	(United States) Anthony Ashnault	TF 12–2	April 6–7, 2024	2024 US Olympic Trials Last Chance Qualifier	(United States) Fairfax, Virginia
Win	3–0	(United States) Aden Valencia	7–4	April 6–7, 2024	2024 US Olympic Trials Last Chance Qualifier	(United States) Fairfax, Virginia
Win	2–0	(United States) Dayne Morton	TF 10–0	April 6–7, 2024	2024 US Olympic Trials Last Chance Qualifier	(United States) Fairfax, Virginia
Win	1–0	(United States) David Evans	TF 13–2	April 6–7, 2024	2024 US Olympic Trials Last Chance Qualifier	(United States) Fairfax, Virginia

=== U23 ===
U23 Freestyle Matches
Res.	Record	Opponent	Score	Date	Event	Location
2026 U23 World Championships 9th at 65 kg
Loss	4-1	(India) Singh Jaskaran	3-6	October 17-18, 2026	2026 U23 World Championships	(United States) Las Vegas, Nevada
Win	4-0	(Canada) Karson Brown	Fall	October 17-18, 2026	2026 U23 World Championships	(United States) Las Vegas, Nevada
2025 Junior Pan American Games (gold) at 65 kg
Win	3-0	(Puerto Rico) Eligh Rivera	TF 11-0	August 20-22, 2025	2025 Junior Pan American Games	Asunción, Paraguay
Win	2-0	(Cuba) Juset Depestre	TF 10-0	August 20-22, 2025	2025 Junior Pan American Games	Asunción, Paraguay
Win	1-0	(Mexico) Diego Aguilar	TF 14-4	August 20-22, 2025	2025 Junior Pan American Games	Asunción, Paraguay

=== U20 ===
U20 Freestyle Matches
Res.	Record	Opponent	Score	Date	Event	Location
2026 U20 World Championships (gold) at 65 kg
Win	46-6	(Japan) Takuto Osedo	8-2	August 20-23, 2026	2026 U20 World Championships	Bratislava, Slovakia
Win	45-6	(Russia) Zalimkhan Umarov	Fall	August 20-23, 2026	2026 U20 World Championships	Bratislava, Slovakia
Win	44-6	(Turkey) Haci Zade	TF 12-2	August 20-23, 2026	2026 U20 World Championships	Bratislava, Slovakia
Win	43-6	(Azerbaijan) Bashir Verdiyev	Fall	August 20-23, 2026	2026 U20 World Championships	Bratislava, Slovakia
Win	42-6	(Kazakhstan) Yeraly Askerbek	TF 11-0	August 20-23, 2026	2026 U20 World Championships	Bratislava, Slovakia
2026 U20 Pan American Championships (gold) at 65 kg
Win	41-6	(Mexico) Fernando Pena	Fall	July 9, 2026	2026 U20 Pan American Championships	Rio de Janeiro, Brazil
Win	40-6	(Puerto Rico) Yandel Morales	TF 10-0	July 9, 2026	2026 U20 Pan American Championships	Rio de Janeiro, Brazil
Win	39-6	(Canada) Diyaal Johal	TF 12-2	July 9, 2026	2026 U20 Pan American Championships	Rio de Janeiro, Brazil
2026 U20 US World Team Trials (gold) at 65 kg
Win	38-6	(United States) Clinton Shepherd	TF 10-0	May 29-31, 2026	2026 U20 US World Team Trials	(United States) Geneva, Ohio
Win	37-6	(United States) Clinton Shepherd	Fall	May 29-31, 2026	2026 U20 US World Team Trials	(United States) Geneva, Ohio
2026 U20 US Open Nationals (gold) at 65 kg
Win	36-6	(United States) Kellen Wolbert	TF 14-4	April 25-26, 2026	2026 U20 US Open National Championships	(United States) Las Vegas, Nevada
Win	35-6	(United States) Tyler Dekraker	TF 14-4	April 25-26, 2026	2026 U20 US Open National Championships	(United States) Las Vegas, Nevada
Win	34-6	(United States) Isaiah Schaefer	TF 11-0	April 25-26, 2026	2026 U20 US Open National Championships	(United States) Las Vegas, Nevada
Win	33-6	(United States) Jake Hockaday	TF 11-0	April 25-26, 2026	2026 U20 US Open National Championships	(United States) Las Vegas, Nevada
Win	32-6	(United States) Valentine Popadiuc	TF 11-0	April 25-26, 2026	2026 U20 US Open National Championships	(United States) Las Vegas, Nevada
Win	31-6	(United States) Jason Saenz	TF 10-0	April 25-26, 2026	2026 U20 US Open National Championships	(United States) Las Vegas, Nevada
Win	30-6	(United States) Luke Satriano	TF 10-0	April 25-26, 2026	2026 U20 US Open National Championships	(United States) Las Vegas, Nevada
2025 U20 US World Team Trials (silver) at 65 kg
Loss	29-6	(United States) Luke Stanich	TF 0-10	May 30-June 1, 2025	2025 U20 US World Team Trials	(United States) Geneva, Ohio
Win	29-5	(United States) Luke Stanich	3-2	May 30-June 1, 2025	2025 U20 US World Team Trials	(United States) Geneva, Ohio
Loss	28-5	(United States) Luke Stanich	2-3	May 30-June 1, 2025	2025 U20 US World Team Trials	(United States) Geneva, Ohio
Win	28-4	(United States) Aden Valencia	5-4	May 30-June 1, 2025	2025 U20 US World Team Trials	(United States) Geneva, Ohio
Win	27-4	(United States) Daniel Zepeda	TF 14-2	May 30-June 1, 2025	2025 U20 US World Team Trials	(United States) Geneva, Ohio
Win	26-4	(United States) Noah Nininger	TF 14-4	May 30-June 1, 2025	2025 U20 US World Team Trials	(United States) Geneva, Ohio
2025 U20 US Open Nationals (bronze) at 65 kg
Win	25-4	(United States) Noah Nininger	TF 12-2	April 23-27, 2024	2025 U20 US Open National Championships	(United States) Las Vegas, Nevada
Win	24-4	(United States) Alex Braun	TF 11-0	April 23-27, 2024	2025 U20 US Open National Championships	(United States) Las Vegas, Nevada
Loss	23-4	(United States) Luke Stanich	2-5	April 23-27, 2024	2025 U20 US Open National Championships	(United States) Las Vegas, Nevada
Win	23-3	(United States) Eren Sement	TF 10-0	April 23-27, 2024	2025 U20 US Open National Championships	(United States) Las Vegas, Nevada
Win	22-3	(United States) Jesse Grajeda	TF 16-5	April 23-27, 2024	2025 U20 US Open National Championships	(United States) Las Vegas, Nevada
Win	21-3	(United States) Tyson Peach	TF 10-0	April 23-27, 2024	2025 U20 US Open National Championships	(United States) Las Vegas, Nevada
Win	20-1	(United States) Joseph Morris	Fall	April 23-27, 2024	2025 U20 US Open National Championships	(United States) Las Vegas, Nevada
Win	19-3	(United States) Thomas Thongseng	Fall	April 23-27, 2024	2025 U20 US Open National Championships	(United States) Las Vegas, Nevada
2024 U20 World Championships (bronze) at 65 kg
Win	18-3	(Georgia (country)) Nikoloz Beshidze	TF 10-0	September 6-8, 2024	2024 U20 World Championships	Pontevedra, Spain
Loss	17-3	(Japan) Makoto Hosokawa	TF 0-10	September 6-8, 2024	2024 U20 World Championships	Pontevedra, Spain
Win	17-2	(India) Nikhil Pilanagoila	Fall	September 6-8, 2024	2024 U20 World Championships	Pontevedra, Spain
Win	16-2	(Individual Neutral Athletes) Dzmitry Shvarts	Fall	September 6-8, 2024	2024 U20 World Championships	Pontevedra, Spain
Win	15-2	(Ukraine) Valentyn Hryhoryshyn	TF 19-8	September 6-8, 2024	2024 U20 World Championships	Pontevedra, Spain
2024 U20 Pan American Championships (gold) at 65 kg
Win	14-2	(Mexico) Diego Aguilar	Fall	July 11-13, 2024	2024 U20 Pan American Championships	Lima, Peru
Win	13-2	(Puerto Rico) Rafael Omar	TF 12-1	July 11-13, 2024	2024 U20 Pan American Championships	Lima, Peru
Win	12-2	(Brazil) Wenzo Silva	Fall	July 11-13, 2024	2024 U20 Pan American Championships	Lima, Peru
2024 U20 US World Team Trials (gold) at 65 kg
Win	11-2	(United States) Aden Valencia	4-0	May 31-June 2, 2024	2024 U20 US World Team Trials	(United States) Geneva, Ohio
Win	10-2	(United States) Aden Valencia	3-2	May 31-June 2, 2024	2024 U20 US World Team Trials	(United States) Geneva, Ohio
2024 U20 US Open Nationals (gold) at 65 kg
Win	9-2	(United States) Aden Valencia	5-2	April 26-27, 2024	2024 U20 US Open National Championships	(United States) Las Vegas, Nevada
Win	8-2	(United States) Koy Buesgens	TF 13-2	April 26-27, 2024	2024 U20 US Open National Championships	(United States) Las Vegas, Nevada
Win	7-2	(United States) Gabriel Bouyssou	Fall	April 26-27, 2024	2024 U20 US Open National Championships	(United States) Las Vegas, Nevada
Win	6-2	(United States) Sergio Vega	14-12	April 26-27, 2024	2024 U20 US Open National Championships	(United States) Las Vegas, Nevada
Win	5-2	(United States) Carter Nogle	TF 10-0	April 26-27, 2024	2024 U20 US Open National Championships	(United States) Las Vegas, Nevada
Win	4-2	(United States) Damon Ingram	Fall	April 26-27, 2024	2024 U20 US Open National Championships	(United States) Las Vegas, Nevada
2023 U20 US World Team Trials 4th at 57 kg
Loss	3-2	(United States) Jore Volk	5-11	June 2-4, 2023	2023 U20 US World Team Trials	(United States) Geneva, Ohio
Win	3-1	(United States) Brendan McCrone	TF 10-0	June 2-4, 2023	2023 U20 US World Team Trials	(United States) Geneva, Ohio
Loss	2-1	(United States) Troy Spratley	5-8	June 2-4, 2023	2023 U20 US World Team Trials	(United States) Geneva, Ohio
Win	2-0	(United States) Shane Corrigan	Fall	June 2-4, 2023	2023 U20 US World Team Trials	(United States) Geneva, Ohio
Win	1-0	(United States) Dominic Mendez	TF 10-0	June 2-4, 2023	2023 U20 US World Team Trials	(United States) Geneva, Ohio

=== U17 ===
U17 Freestyle Matches
Res.	Record	Opponent	Score	Date	Event	Location
2023 U17 World Team Trials 4th at 55 kg
loss	21-4	(United States) Isaiah Cortez	1-4	April 26-30, 2023	2023 U17 US Open World Team Trials	(United States) Las Vegas, Nevada
Win	21-3	(United States) Jayden Raney	Forfeit	April 26-30, 2023	2023 U17 US Open World Team Trials	(United States) Las Vegas, Nevada
Win	20-3	(United States) Jackson Blum	TF 16-6	April 26-30, 2023	2023 U17 US Open World Team Trials	(United States) Las Vegas, Nevada
Win	19-3	(United States) Isaac Hampton	TF 10-0	April 26-30, 2023	2023 U17 US Open World Team Trials	(United States) Las Vegas, Nevada
Loss	18-3	(United States) Elijah Cortez	3-5	April 26-30, 2023	2023 U17 US Open World Team Trials	(United States) Las Vegas, Nevada
Win	18-2	(United States) Ronnie Ramirez	TF 12-2	April 26-30, 2023	2023 U17 US Open World Team Trials	(United States) Las Vegas, Nevada
Win	17-2	(United States) Presley Johnson	TF 11-0	April 26-30, 2023	2023 U17 US Open World Team Trials	(United States) Las Vegas, Nevada
Win	16-2	(United States) Caio Aron	TF 10-0	April 26-30, 2023	2023 U17 US Open World Team Trials	(United States) Las Vegas, Nevada
2022 World Team Trials (silver) at 51 kg
loss	15-2	(United States) Luke Lilledahl	TF 0-10	April 27-May 1, 2022	2022 U17 US Open World Team Trials	(United States) Las Vegas, Nevada
Loss	15-1	(United States) Luke Lilledahl	1-6	April 27-May 1, 2022	2022 U17 US Open World Team Trials	(United States) Las Vegas, Nevada
Win	15-0	(United States) Edwin Sierra	TF 13-2	April 27-May 1, 2022	2022 U17 US Open World Team Trials	(United States) Las Vegas, Nevada
Win	14-0	(United States) Reid Spurley	11-4	April 27-May 1, 2022	2022 U17 US Open World Team Trials	(United States) Las Vegas, Nevada
Win	13-0	(United States) Kyle Sieminski	TF 16-5	April 27-May 1, 2022	2022 U17 US Open World Team Trials	(United States) Las Vegas, Nevada
Win	12-0	(United States) Carter Nogle	11-5	April 27-May 1, 2022	2022 U17 US Open World Team Trials	(United States) Las Vegas, Nevada
2021 U17 World Championships (gold) at 45 kg
Win	11-0	(Russia) Alikhan Ashinov	Fall	July 19-25, 2021	2021 U17 World Championships	Budapest, Hungary
Win	10-0	(Uzbekistan) Umidjon Iskandarov	TF 13-2	July 19-25, 2021	2021 U17 World Championships	Budapest, Hungary
Win	9-0	(Azerbaijan) Yusif Isparov	Fall	July 19-25, 2021	2021 U17 World Championships	Budapest, Hungary
Win	8-0	(Georgia (country)) Malkhazi Khelaia	Fall	July 19-25, 2021	2021 U17 World Championships	Budapest, Hungary
2021 U17 Pan American Championships (gold) at 45 kg
Win	7-0	(Mexico) Roger Baltazar	TF 10-0	June 9-13, 2021	2021 U17 Pan American Championships	Oaxtepec, Mexico
Win	6-0	(Panama) Samir Abrahan	TF 10-0	June 9-13, 2021	2021 U17 Pan American Championships	Oaxtepec, Mexico
2021 U17 World Team Trials (gold) at 45 kg
Win	5-0	(United States) Mack Mauger	Fall	April 23-25, 2021	2021 U17 World Team Trials	(United States) Wisconsin Dells, Wisconsin
Win	4-0	(United States) Mack Mauger	TF 10-0	April 23-25, 2021	2021 U17 World Team Trials	(United States) Wisconsin Dells, Wisconsin
Win	3-0	(United States) Edwin Sierra	TF 12-2	April 23-25, 2021	2021 U17 World Team Trials	(United States) Wisconsin Dells, Wisconsin
Win	2-0	(United States) Everest Sutton	TF 12-2	April 23-25, 2021	2021 U17 World Team Trials	(United States) Wisconsin Dells, Wisconsin
Win	1-0	(United States) Stockton Allen	TF 10-0	April 23-25, 2021	2021 U17 World Team Trials	(United States) Wisconsin Dells, Wisconsin

== Greco-Roman record ==
=== U17 ===
U17 Greco-Roman Matches
Res.	Record	Opponent	Score	Date	Event	Location
2023 U17 US World Team Trials DNP at 55 kg
loss	14-5	(United States) Jayden Raney	3-5	April 26-30, 2023	2023 U17 US Open World Team Trials	(United States) Las Vegas, Nevada
Win	14-4	(United States) Slater Hicks	Forfeit	April 26-30, 2023	2023 U17 US Open World Team Trials	(United States) Las Vegas, Nevada
Win	13-4	(United States) Seach Hibler	TF 9-1	April 26-30, 2023	2023 U17 US Open World Team Trials	(United States) Las Vegas, Nevada
Loss	12-4	(United States) Jackson Heslin	TF 0-10	April 26-30, 2023	2023 U17 US Open World Team Trials	(United States) Las Vegas, Nevada
Win	12-3	(United States) Kekoa Ogawa	TF 11-0	April 26-30, 2023	2023 U17 US Open World Team Trials	(United States) Las Vegas, Nevada
2022 U17 US World Team Trials 7th at 51 kg
Win	11-3	(United States) Jaxton Packer	Forfeit	April 27-May 1, 2022	2022 U17 US Open World Team Trials	(United States) Las Vegas, Nevada
Loss	10-3	(United States) Cooper Hilton	1-7	April 27-May 1, 2022	2022 U17 US Open World Team Trials	(United States) Las Vegas, Nevada
Win	10-2	(United States) Robert Jones	Fall	April 27-May 1, 2022	2022 U17 US Open World Team Trials	(United States) Las Vegas, Nevada
Win	9-2	(United States) Glade Harman	TF 13-4	April 27-May 1, 2022	2022 U17 US Open World Team Trials	(United States) Las Vegas, Nevada
Win	8-2	(United States) Talen Eck	TF 8-0	April 27-May 1, 2022	2022 U17 US Open World Team Trials	(United States) Las Vegas, Nevada
Loss	7-2	(United States) Elijah Cortez	3-5	April 27-May 1, 2022	2022 U17 US Open World Team Trials	(United States) Las Vegas, Nevada
Win	7-1	(United States) Jeremiah Wachsmuth	TF 10-2	April 27-May 1, 2022	2022 U17 US Open World Team Trials	(United States) Las Vegas, Nevada
2021 U17 World Championships 12th at 45 kg
Loss	6-1	(Russia) Ruslan Lukiaev	TF 0-8	July 19-25, 2021	2021 U17 World Championships	Budapest, Hungary
2021 U17 Pan American Championships (gold) at 45 kg
Win	6-0	(Brazil) Joao Pedro	TF 8-0	June 9-13, 2021	2021 U17 Pan American Championships	Oaxtepec, Mexico
Win	5-0	(Mexico) Roger Baltazar	TF 8-0	June 9-13, 2021	2021 U17 Pan American Championships	Oaxtepec, Mexico
2021 U17 US World Team Trials (gold) at 45 kg
Win	4-0	(United States) Mack Mauger	TF 11-2	April 23-25, 2021	2021 U17 US World Team Trials	(United States) Wisconsin Dells, Wisconsin
Win	3-0	(United States) Mack Mauger	Fall	April 23-25, 2021	2021 U17 US World Team Trials	(United States) Wisconsin Dells, Wisconsin
Win	2-0	(United States) Cadyn Coyle	TF 8-0	April 23-25, 2021	2021 U17 US World Team Trials	(United States) Wisconsin Dells, Wisconsin
Win	1-0	(United States) Javaan Yarbrough	TF 12-4	April 23-25, 2021	2021 U17 US World Team Trials	(United States) Wisconsin Dells, Wisconsin

== Folkstyle record ==
=== Collegiate ===
Collegiate Matches
Res.	Record	Opponent	Score	Date	Event	Location
Win	5-0	(United States) Presley Johnson	TF 17-2	November 19, 2026	Virginia Tech vs. The Citadel	(United States) Blacksburg, Virginia
2026 Journeymen Collegiate Classic (gold) at 141 lb Black
Win	4-0	(United States) Zach Redding	TF 19-4	November 8, 2026	Journeymen Collegiate Classic	(United States) Bethlehem, Pennsylvania
Win	3-0	(United States) Coleman Nogle	TF 23-4	November 8, 2026	Journeymen Collegiate Classic	(United States) Bethlehem, Pennsylvania
Win	2-0	(United States) Joey Buttler	TF 23-4	November 8, 2026	Journeymen Collegiate Classic	(United States) Bethlehem, Pennsylvania
Win	1-0	(United States) Luke Stanich	13-9	November 6, 2026	Virginia Tech at Lehigh	(United States) Bethlehem, Pennsylvania
Start of 2026–2027 Season (freshman year)

Unattached Matches
Res.	Record	Opponent	Score	Date	Event	Location
2025 Shorty Hitchcock Memorial Open (gold) at 149 lb
Win	20-0	(United States) Jackson Butler	TF 19-3	November 15, 2025	Shorty Hitchcock Memorial Open	(United States) Millersville, Pennsylvania
Win	19-0	(United States) Gideon Bracken	TF 22-4	November 15, 2025	Shorty Hitchcock Memorial Open	(United States) Millersville, Pennsylvania
Win	18-0	(United States) Jake Samuels	TF 21-6	November 15, 2025	Shorty Hitchcock Memorial Open	(United States) Millersville, Pennsylvania
Win	17-0	(United States) Jay Chase	TF 19-3	November 15, 2025	Shorty Hitchcock Memorial Open	(United States) Millersville, Pennsylvania
Win	16-0	(United States) James Latona	TF 19-3	November 15, 2025	Shorty Hitchcock Memorial Open	(United States) Millersville, Pennsylvania
2025 Clarion Open (gold) at 149 lb
Win	15-0	(United States) Jaxon Joy	MD 11-1	November 2, 2025	Clarion Open	(United States) Clarion, Pennsylvania
Win	14-0	(United States) Caleb Tyus	TF 21-6	November 2, 2025	Clarion Open	(United States) Clarion, Pennsylvania
Win	13-0	(United States) Bryce Shelton	TF 19-4	November 2, 2025	Clarion Open	(United States) Clarion, Pennsylvania
Win	12-0	(United States) Nathan Higley	TF 24-7	November 2, 2025	Clarion Open	(United States) Clarion, Pennsylvania
Win	11-0	(United States) Dominic Ferraro	M FOR 1:04	November 2, 2025	Clarion Open	(United States) Clarion, Pennsylvania
Start of 2025–2026 Season (HS senior year)
Start of 2024–2025 Season (HS junior year)
2023 Shorty Hitchcock Memorial Open (gold) at 133 lb
Win	10-0	(United States) Devin Flannery	TF 23-4	November 18, 2023	Shorty Hitchcock Memorial Open	(United States) Millersville, Pennsylvania
Win	9-0	(United States) Aidan O'Shea	TF 19-4	November 18, 2023	Shorty Hitchcock Memorial Open	(United States) Millersville, Pennsylvania
Win	8-0	(United States) Collin Higgins	TF 19-3	November 18, 2023	Shorty Hitchcock Memorial Open	(United States) Millersville, Pennsylvania
Win	7-0	(United States) Brandon Sauter	TF 19-4	November 18, 2023	Shorty Hitchcock Memorial Open	(United States) Millersville, Pennsylvania
Win	6-0	(United States) Geovanni Lainez	TF 20-3	November 18, 2023	Shorty Hitchcock Memorial Open	(United States) Millersville, Pennsylvania
2023 Clarion Open (gold) at 133 lb
Win	5-0	(United States) Vinnie Santaniello	Dec 13-10	November 5, 2023	Clarion Open	(United States) Clarion, Pennsylvania
Win	4-0	(United States) Angelo Rini	Dec 11-7	November 5, 2023	Clarion Open	(United States) Clarion, Pennsylvania
Win	3-0	(United States) Scott Johnson	TF 22-7	November 5, 2023	Clarion Open	(United States) Clarion, Pennsylvania
Win	2-0	(United States) Andre Gonzalez	MD 11-1	November 5, 2023	Clarion Open	(United States) Clarion, Pennsylvania
Win	1-0	(United States) Takeo Davis	TF 20-4	November 5, 2023	Clarion Open	(United States) Clarion, Pennsylvania
Start of 2023–2024 Season (HS sophomore year)
Start of 2022–2023 Season (HS freshman year)

==== Stats ====
Season	Year	School	Rank	Weigh Class	Record	Win	Bonus
2027	Freshman	Virginia Tech University	#1 (1st)	141	5-0	100.00%	80.00%
Career					5–0	100.00%	80.00%

=== High School ===
Highschool Matches
Res.	Record	Opponent	Score	Date	Event	Location
2026 PIAA AA Championships (gold) at 145 lb
Win	170-0	(United States) Brandt Harer	Fall	March 7, 2026	PIAA AA Championships	(United States) Hershey, Pennsylvania
Win	169-0	(United States) Greyson Music	TF 21-6	March 6, 2026	PIAA AA Championships	(United States) Hershey, Pennsylvania
Win	168-0	(United States) Charley Paige	TF 17-2	March 6, 2026	PIAA AA Championships	(United States) Hershey, Pennsylvania
Win	167-0	(United States) Jacob Mackie	TF 19-3	March 5, 2026	PIAA AA Championships	(United States) Hershey, Pennsylvania
2026 South West AA Regional (gold) at 145 lb
Win	166-0	(United States) Caden Judice	TF 21-6	February 28, 2026	South West AA Regional	(United States) Altoona, Pennsylvania
Win	165-0	(United States) Averi Gable	TF 23-4	February 28, 2026	South West AA Regional	(United States) Altoona, Pennsylvania
Win	164-0	(United States) Ethan Bosco	TF 20-3	February 27, 2026	South West AA Regional	(United States) Altoona, Pennsylvania
Win	163-0	(United States) Colby Kaufman	TF 17-2	February 27, 2026	South West AA Regional	(United States) Altoona, Pennsylvania
2026 District 6 AA (gold) at 145 lb
Win	162-0	(United States) Caden Judice	TF 19-4	February 14, 2026	District 6 AA	(United States) Altoona, Pennsylvania
Win	161-0	(United States) Averi Gable	TF 19-4	February 14, 2026	District 6 AA	(United States) Altoona, Pennsylvania
Win	160-0	(United States) Ty Fahnestock	TF 17-2	February 13, 2026	District 6 AA	(United States) Altoona, Pennsylvania
Win	159-0	(United States) Carter Crain	TF 17-2	February 13, 2026	District 6 AA	(United States) Altoona, Pennsylvania
2026 PIAA Class AA Duals (silver) Team Runner-Up
Win	158-0	(United States) Joe Bachmann	3-1	February 7, 2026	PIAA Class AA Duals	(United States) Johnstown, Pennsylvania
Win	157-0	(United States) Jonmark Harbaugh	TF 21-4	February 7, 2026	PIAA Class AA Duals	(United States) Johnstown, Pennsylvania
Win	156-0	(United States) Montgomery	Forfeit	February 6, 2026	PIAA Class AA Duals	(United States) Johnstown, Pennsylvania
Win	155-0	(United States) Clay Kimmy	TF 24-4	February 3, 2026	PIAA Class AA Duals	(United States) Johnstown, Pennsylvania
2026 District 6 AA Duals (gold) Team Champions
Win	154-0	(United States) Isaac Harpster	TF 18-2	January 31, 2026	District 6 AA Duals	(United States) Spring Mills, Pennsylvania
Win	153-0	(United States) Luke Mykut	TF 18-1	January 31, 2026	District 6 AA Duals	(United States) Spring Mills, Pennsylvania
Win	152-0	(United States) Logan Clark	TF 19-3	January 29, 2026	District 6 AA Duals	(United States) Johnstown, Pennsylvania
Win	151-0	(United States) Michael Turi	TF 19-3	January 22, 2026	Bishop McCort vs. Wyoming Seminary	(United States) Johnstown, Pennsylvania
Win	150-0	(United States) Grayson Fuchs	Fall	January 17, 2026	DCC Super Duals	(United States) Novi, Michigan
Win	149-0	(United States) Cooper Driscoll	TF 19-3	January 17, 2026	DCC Super Duals	(United States) Novi, Michigan
Win	148-0	(United States) Max McCarthy	TF 17-1	January 17, 2026	DCC Super Duals	(United States) Novi, Michigan
Win	147-0	(United States) Pryce Johnson	Fall	January 17, 2026	DCC Super Duals	(United States) Novi, Michigan
Win	146-0	(United States) Landon Kline	TF 20-2	January 15, 2026	Bishop McCort at Westmont Hilltop	(United States) Johnstown, Pennsylvania
Win	145-0	(United States) Johnathan Johnson	TF 15-0	January 13, 2026	Bishop McCort vs. Forest Hills	(United States) Johnstown, Pennsylvania
2026 Laurel Highlands Championships (gold) at 152 lb
Win	144-0	(United States) Ezra Swisher	TF 19-4	January 3, 2026	Laurel Highlands Championships	(United States) Ebensburg, Pennsylvania
Win	143-0	(United States) Colton Bumbarger	TF 21-6	January 3, 2026	Laurel Highlands Championships	(United States) Ebensburg, Pennsylvania
Win	142-0	(United States) Mason Nagle	Fall	January 2, 2026	Laurel Highlands Championships	(United States) Ebensburg, Pennsylvania
Win	141-0	(United States) Chase Goldcamp	Fall	January 2, 2026	Laurel Highlands Championships	(United States) Ebensburg, Pennsylvania
2025 Beast of the East (gold) at 150 lb
Win	140-0	(United States) Charlie Desena	TF 15-0	December 21, 2025	Beast of the East	(United States) Newark, Delaware
Win	139-0	(United States) Brady Hand	TF 26-10	December 21, 2025	Beast of the East	(United States) Newark, Delaware
Win	138-0	(United States) Joseph Petriello	TF 22-4	December 21, 2025	Beast of the East	(United States) Newark, Delaware
Win	137-0	(United States) Henry Santini	TF 16-1	December 20, 2025	Beast of the East	(United States) Newark, Delaware
Win	136-0	(United States) Canaan Spears	TF 20-3	December 20, 2025	Beast of the East	(United States) Newark, Delaware
Win	135-0	(United States) Anthony Borrometi	TF 18-2	December 20, 2025	Beast of the East	(United States) Newark, Delaware
Win	134-0	(United States) Maurice Taylor	Fall	December 16, 2025	Bishop McCort vs. Greater Johnstown	(United States) Johnstown, Pennsylvania
2025 Walsh Ironman (gold) at 150 lb
Win	133-0	(United States) Joe Bachmann	MD 14-6	December 13, 2025	Walsh Ironman	(United States) Cuyahoga Falls, Ohio
Win	132-0	(United States) Bentley Sly	TF 17-1	December 13, 2025	Walsh Ironman	(United States) Cuyahoga Falls, Ohio
Win	131-0	(United States) Jason Dube	TF 18-3	December 12, 2025	Walsh Ironman	(United States) Cuyahoga Falls, Ohio
Win	130-0	(United States) Cameron Plotts	TF 21-5	December 12, 2025	Walsh Ironman	(United States) Cuyahoga Falls, Ohio
Win	129-0	(United States) Shiloh Jackson-Bey	TF 20-2	December 12, 2025	Walsh Ironman	(United States) Cuyahoga Falls, Ohio
Win	128-0	(United States) Avery Leap	TF 17-2	December 9, 2025	Bishop McCort at Richland	(United States) Johnstown, Pennsylvania
Win	127-0	(United States) Braden Thomas	TF 17-2	December 4, 2025	Bishop McCort vs. Central Cambria	(United States) Johnstown, Pennsylvania
Start of 2025–2026 Season (senior year)
2025 PIAA AA Championships (gold) at 145 lb
Win	126-0	(United States) Hudson Hohman	Fall	March 8, 2025	PIAA AA Championships	(United States) Hershey, Pennsylvania
Win	125-0	(United States) Mason Wagner	TF 18-3	March 7, 2025	PIAA AA Championships	(United States) Hershey, Pennsylvania
Win	124-0	(United States) Cole Householder	TF 19-4	March 7, 2025	PIAA AA Championships	(United States) Hershey, Pennsylvania
Win	123-0	(United States) Andrew Messner	TF 21-6	March 6, 2025	PIAA AA Championships	(United States) Hershey, Pennsylvania
2025 South West AA Regional (gold) at 145 lb
Win	122-0	(United States) Lucas Boyer	TF 21-6	March 1, 2025	South West AA Regional	(United States) Altoona, Pennsylvania
Win	121-0	(United States) Aaron Ickes	TF 19-4	March 1, 2025	South West AA Regional	(United States) Altoona, Pennsylvania
Win	120-0	(United States) Tristan Wtorkiewicz	Fall	February 28, 2025	South West AA Regional	(United States) Altoona, Pennsylvania
Win	119-0	(United States) Sam Sheeler	TF 25-6	February 28, 2025	South West AA Regional	(United States) Altoona, Pennsylvania
2025 District 6 AA (gold) at 145 lb
Win	118-0	(United States) Josef Garshnick	TF 19-4	February 15, 2025	District 6 AA	(United States) Altoona, Pennsylvania
Win	117-0	(United States) Isaac Filak	Fall	February 15, 2025	District 6 AA	(United States) Altoona, Pennsylvania
Win	116-0	(United States) Brodie Soler	Fall	February 14, 2025	District 6 AA	(United States) Altoona, Pennsylvania
Win	115-0	(United States) Jeremiah Hart	Fall	February 14, 2025	District 6 AA	(United States) Altoona, Pennsylvania
2025 PIAA Class AA Duals (silver) Team Runner-Up
Win	114-0	(United States) Max Stein	MD 17-9	February 8, 2025	PIAA Class AA Duals	(United States) Altoona, Pennsylvania
Win	113-0	(United States) Coy Koller	Fall	February 8, 2025	PIAA Class AA Duals	(United States) Altoona, Pennsylvania
Win	112-0	(United States) Ryan Meredith	Fall	February 7, 2025	PIAA Class AA Duals	(United States) Altoona, Pennsylvania
Win	111-0	(United States) Zach Nichols	Fall	February 4, 2025	PIAA Class AA Duals	(United States) Johnstown, Pennsylvania
2025 District 6 AA Duals (gold) Team Champions
Win	110-0	(United States) Sawyer Fetterolf	Fall	February 1, 2025	District 6 AA Duals	(United States) Spring Mills, Pennsylvania
Win	109-0	(United States) Easton Grimes	Fall	February 1, 2025	District 6 AA Duals	(United States) Johnstown, Pennsylvania
Win	108-0	(United States) Kaden Horn	TF 19-2	January 28, 2025	Bishop McCort vs. Central	(United States) Johnstown, Pennsylvania
Win	107-0	(United States) Bryce Carroll	Fall	January 16, 2025	Bishop McCort at Forest Hills	(United States) Sidman, Pennsylvania
2025 Mid-Winter Mayhem (gold) at 145 lb
Win	106-0	(United States) Jackson Butler	TF 19-3	January 11, 2025	Mid-Winter Mayhem	(United States) Indiana, Pennsylvania
Win	105-0	(United States) Kase Chopp	TF 19-3	January 11, 2025	Mid-Winter Mayhem	(United States) Indiana, Pennsylvania
Win	104-0	(United States) Clay Kimmy	TF 24-8	January 10, 2025	Mid-Winter Mayhem	(United States) Indiana, Pennsylvania
Win	103-0	(United States) Luke Evans	TF 18-1	January 10, 2025	Mid-Winter Mayhem	(United States) Indiana, Pennsylvania
Win	102-0	(United States) Tyler Phillips	TF 17-2	January 10, 2025	Mid-Winter Mayhem	(United States) Indiana, Pennsylvania
Win	101-0	(United States) Brayden Rodney	TF 24-3	January 10, 2025	Mid-Winter Mayhem	(United States) Indiana, Pennsylvania
Win	100-0	(United States) Wyatt Fry	TF 21-5	January 8, 2025	Bishop McCort at Wyoming Seminary	(United States) Kingston, Pennsylvania
Win	99-0	(United States) Greater Johnstown	Forfeit	January 7, 2025	Bishop McCort at Greater Johnstown	(United States) Johnstown, Pennsylvania
2025 Laurel Highlands Championships (gold) at 145 lb
Win	98-0	(United States) Aaron Ickes	TF 18-3	January 4, 2025	Laurel Highlands Championships	(United States) Ebensburg, Pennsylvania
Win	97-0	(United States) Sam Sheeler	TF 20-3	January 4, 2025	Laurel Highlands Championships	(United States) Ebensburg, Pennsylvania
Win	96-0	(United States) Grant Koontz	TF 19-4	January 3, 2025	Laurel Highlands Championships	(United States) Ebensburg, Pennsylvania
Win	95-0	(United States) Gracie Pluebell	Fall	January 3, 2025	Laurel Highlands Championships	(United States) Ebensburg, Pennsylvania
2024 Powerade (gold) at 145 lb
Win	94-0	(United States) Declan O'Byrne	Fall	December 28, 2024	Powerade	(United States) Canonsburg, Pennsylvania
Win	93-0	(United States) Adam Butler	Fall	December 28, 2024	Powerade	(United States) Canonsburg, Pennsylvania
Win	92-0	(United States) Londen Murphy	Fall	December 27, 2024	Powerade	(United States) Canonsburg, Pennsylvania
Win	91-0	(United States) Adonis Iparraguirre	Fall	December 27, 2024	Powerade	(United States) Canonsburg, Pennsylvania
Win	90-0	(United States) Evan Suedhoff	Fall	December 27, 2024	Powerade	(United States) Canonsburg, Pennsylvania
2024 National Wrestling Hall of Fame Classic (gold) Team Champions
Win	89-0	(United States) Nicholas Schwartz	Fall	December 21, 2024	National Wrestling Hall of Fame Classic	(United States) Stillwater, Oklahoma
Win	88-0	(United States) Garrison Sartain	TF 19-4	December 21, 2024	National Wrestling Hall of Fame Classic	(United States) Stillwater, Oklahoma
Win	87-0	(United States) Joseph Joyce	Fall	December 21, 2024	National Wrestling Hall of Fame Classic	(United States) Stillwater, Oklahoma
Win	86-0	(United States) Joseph Sanderfer Jr	Fall	December 20, 2024	National Wrestling Hall of Fame Classic	(United States) Stillwater, Oklahoma
Win	85-0	(United States) Maddox Stonitsch	TF 23-4	December 20, 2024	National Wrestling Hall of Fame Classic	(United States) Stillwater, Oklahoma
Win	84-0	(United States) Parker Enciso	TF 19-4	December 17, 2024	Bishop McCort vs. Richland	(United States) Johnstown, Pennsylvania
Win	83-0	(United States) Central Cambria	Forfeit	December 10, 2024	Bishop McCort at Central Cambria	(United States) Ebensburg, Pennsylvania
2024 Walsh Jesuit Ironman (gold) at 144 lb
Win	82-0	(United States) Carlos Stanton	TF 22-4	December 7, 2024	Walsh Jesuit Ironman	(United States) Cuyahoga Falls, Ohio
Win	81-0	(United States) Joseph Sanderfer Jr	TF 19-3	December 7, 2024	Walsh Jesuit Ironman	(United States) Cuyahoga Falls, Ohio
Win	80-0	(United States) Aidan Arnett	TF 21-5	December 6, 2024	Walsh Jesuit Ironman	(United States) Cuyahoga Falls, Ohio
Win	79-0	(United States) Mason Thomas	TF 21-6	December 6, 2024	Walsh Jesuit Ironman	(United States) Cuyahoga Falls, Ohio
Win	78-0	(United States) Diesel Pedersen	TF 21-6	December 6, 2024	Walsh Jesuit Ironman	(United States) Cuyahoga Falls, Ohio
Win	77-0	(United States) Declan O'Byrne	TF 20-3	December 6, 2024	Walsh Jesuit Ironman	(United States) Cuyahoga Falls, Ohio
Win	76-0	(United States) Deshonn Valentine	TF 17-2	December 4, 2024	Bishop McCort vs. Somerset	(United States) Johnstown, Pennsylvania
Win	75-0	(United States) Wyatt Myers	TF 19-1	December 3, 2024	Bishop McCort vs. Westmont Hilltop	(United States) Johnstown, Pennsylvania
Start of 2024–2025 Season (junior year)
2024 PIAA AA Championships (gold) at 139 lb
Win	74-0	(United States) Cameron Mingee	TF 21-6	March 9, 2024	PIAA AA Championships	(United States) Hershey, Pennsylvania
Win	73-0	(United States) Chase Bell	TF 20-5	March 8, 2024	PIAA AA Championships	(United States) Hershey, Pennsylvania
Win	72-0	(United States) Alex Rueberger	Fall	March 8, 2024	PIAA AA Championships	(United States) Hershey, Pennsylvania
Win	71-0	(United States) Easton Comp	Fall	March 7, 2024	PIAA AA Championships	(United States) Hershey, Pennsylvania
2024 South West AA Regional (gold) at 139 lb
Win	70-0	(United States) Cooper Hornack	Fall	March 2, 2024	South West AA Regional	(United States) Altoona, Pennsylvania
Win	69-0	(United States) Gaven Suica	Fall	March 2, 2024	South West AA Regional	(United States) Altoona, Pennsylvania
Win	68-0	(United States) Aiden Burford	Fall	March 1, 2024	South West AA Regional	(United States) Altoona, Pennsylvania
Win	67-0	(United States) Ryder Goe	TF 20-3	March 1, 2024	South West AA Regional	(United States) Altoona, Pennsylvania
2024 District 6 AA (gold) at 139 lb
Win	66-0	(United States) Marcus Gable	TF 20-5	February 17, 2024	District 6 AA	(United States) Altoona, Pennsylvania
Win	65-0	(United States) Ezra Swisher	TF 20-5	February 17, 2024	District 6 AA	(United States) Altoona, Pennsylvania
Win	64-0	(United States) Micah Atherton	TF 18-3	February 16, 2024	District 6 AA	(United States) Altoona, Pennsylvania
Win	63-0	(United States) Kayson Tice	TF 21-5	February 16, 2024	District 6 AA	(United States) Altoona, Pennsylvania
2024 PIAA Class AA Duals (silver) Team Runner-Up
Win	62-0	(United States) Arment Waltenbaugh	Fall	February 10, 2024	PIAA Class AA Duals	(United States) Hershey, Pennsylvania
Win	61-0	(United States) Carter Wharton	Fall	February 9, 2024	PIAA Class AA Duals	(United States) Hershey, Pennsylvania
Win	60-0	(United States) Cadyn Crawford	Fall	February 9, 2024	PIAA Class AA Duals	(United States) Hershey, Pennsylvania
Win	59-0	(United States) Laine Holtry	Fall	February 8, 2024	PIAA Class AA Duals	(United States) Hershey, Pennsylvania
Win	58-0	(United States) Westmont Hilltop	Forfeit	February 6, 2024	Bishop McCort at Westmont Hilltop	(United States) Johnstown, Pennsylvania
2024 District 6 AA Duals (gold) Team Champions
Win	57-0	(United States) Kayson Tice	Fall	February 3, 2024	District 6 AA Duals	(United States) Wingate, Pennsylvania
Win	56-0	(United States) Eric Mykut	Fall	February 3, 2024	District 6 AA Duals	(United States) Wingate, Pennsylvania
Win	55-0	(United States) Peyton Gallaher	Fall	January 30, 2024	District 6 AA Duals	(United States) Johnstown, Pennsylvania
Win	54-0	(United States) William Allen	TF 19-3	January 20, 2024	Corry Beaver Brawl Duals	(United States) Corry, Pennsylvania
Win	53-0	(United States) Kyler See	TF 21-4	January 20, 2024	Corry Beaver Brawl Duals	(United States) Corry, Pennsylvania
Win	52-0	(United States) Nate Stearns	TF 18-2	January 20, 2024	Corry Beaver Brawl Duals	(United States) Corry, Pennsylvania
Win	51-0	(United States) Mike Reardon	TF 18-2	January 20, 2024	Corry Beaver Brawl Duals	(United States) Corry, Pennsylvania
Win	50-0	(United States) Brody Wehler	TF 23-5	January 20, 2024	Corry Beaver Brawl Duals	(United States) Corry, Pennsylvania
Win	49-0	(United States) Glenn Sample	TF 23-3	January 20, 2024	Corry Beaver Brawl Duals	(United States) Corry, Pennsylvania
Win	48-0	(United States) Hunter Forcellini	Fall	January 18, 2024	Bishop McCort vs. Forest Hills	(United States) Johnstown, Pennsylvania
Win	47-0	(United States) Greater Johnstown	Forfeit	January 15, 2024	Bishop McCort vs. Greater Johnstown	(United States) Johnstown, Pennsylvania
2024 Mid-Winter Mayhem (gold) at 139 lb
Win	46-0	(United States) Kase Chopp	TF 19-4	January 13, 2024	Mid-Winter Mayhem	(United States) Indiana, Pennsylvania
Win	45-0	(United States) Nolan Baumert	TF 22-7	January 13, 2024	Mid-Winter Mayhem	(United States) Indiana, Pennsylvania
Win	44-0	(United States) Davey Aughenbaugh	TF 21-5	January 12, 2024	Mid-Winter Mayhem	(United States) Indiana, Pennsylvania
Win	43-0	(United States) Noah Ruibal	TF 22-7	January 12, 2024	Mid-Winter Mayhem	(United States) Indiana, Pennsylvania
Win	42-0	(United States) Kyler See	TF 21-4	January 12, 2024	Mid-Winter Mayhem	(United States) Indiana, Pennsylvania
2024 Laurel Highlands Championships (gold) at 139 lb
Win	41-0	(United States) Ezra Swisher	TF 25-9	January 6, 2024	Laurel Highlands Championships	(United States) Tyrone, Pennsylvania
Win	40-0	(United States) Colton Ryan	TF 19-4	January 6, 2024	Laurel Highlands Championships	(United States) Tyrone, Pennsylvania
Win	39-0	(United States) Connor Maney	TF 20-5	January 5, 2024	Laurel Highlands Championships	(United States) Tyrone, Pennsylvania
Win	38-0	(United States) Job Hagen	TF 19-4	January 5, 2024	Laurel Highlands Championships	(United States) Tyrone, Pennsylvania
2023 Powerade (gold) at 139 lb
Win	37-0	(United States) Luke Simcox	10-3	December 30, 2023	Powerade	(United States) Canonsburg, Pennsylvania
Win	36-0	(United States) Noah Nininger	TF 22-3	December 30, 2023	Powerade	(United States) Canonsburg, Pennsylvania
Win	35-0	(United States) Kade Brown	MD 18-8	December 29, 2023	Powerade	(United States) Canonsburg, Pennsylvania
Win	34-0	(United States) Bryce Manera	TF 25-10	December 29, 2023	Powerade	(United States) Canonsburg, Pennsylvania
Win	33-0	(United States) Luke Jordan	TF 22-6	December 29, 2023	Powerade	(United States) Canonsburg, Pennsylvania
Win	32-0	(United States) Hayden Hughes	Fall	December 21, 2023	Bishop McCort at Graham	(United States) Columbus, Ohio
Win	31-0	(United States) Richland	Forfeit	December 19, 2023	Bishop McCort at Richland	(United States) Johnstown, Pennsylvania
2023 Carnahan Memorial Invitational (gold) at 138 lb
Win	30-0	(United States) Collin McDowell	Fall	December 16, 2023	Carnahan Memorial Invitational	(United States) Crown Point, Indiana
Win	29-0	(United States) Clinton Shepherd	TF 19-4	December 16, 2023	Carnahan Memorial Invitational	(United States) Crown Point, Indiana
Win	28-0	(United States) Zach Stewart	Fall	December 16, 2023	Carnahan Memorial Invitational	(United States) Crown Point, Indiana
Win	27-0	(United States) Cordell Hilton	Fall	December 16, 2023	Carnahan Memorial Invitational	(United States) Crown Point, Indiana
Win	26-0	(United States) Jacob Wilson	TF 25-7	December 12, 2023	Bishop McCort vs. Central Cambria	(United States) Johnstown, Pennsylvania
2023 Walsh Jesuit Ironman (gold) at 138 lb
Win	25-0	(United States) Omar Ayoub	5-1	December 9, 2023	Walsh Ironman	(United States) Cuyahoga Falls, Ohio
Win	24-0	(United States) Billy DeKraker	TF 24-8	December 9, 2023	Walsh Ironman	(United States) Cuyahoga Falls, Ohio
Win	23-0	(United States) Charles Curtis	TF 20-5	December 8, 2023	Walsh Ironman	(United States) Cuyahoga Falls, Ohio
Win	22-0	(United States) Hayden Hughes	Fall	December 8, 2023	Walsh Ironman	(United States) Cuyahoga Falls, Ohio
Win	21-0	(United States) Taggart Wade	TF 23-8	December 8, 2023	Walsh Ironman	(United States) Cuyahoga Falls, Ohio
Win	20-0	(United States) Chase Bell	TF 27-12	December 8, 2023	Walsh Ironman	(United States) Cuyahoga Falls, Ohio
Win	19-0	(United States) Drew Miller	TF 18-1	December 7, 2023	Bishop McCort at Somerset	(United States) Somerset, Pennsylvania
Start of 2023–2024 Season (sophomore year)
2023 East Coast Catholic Classic (gold) at 120 lb
Win	18-0	(United States) Santino Rodriguez	TF 26-10	January 7, 2023	East Coast Catholic Classic	(United States) Richmond, Virginia
Win	17-0	(United States) Tyler Wood	TF 23-8	January 7, 2023	East Coast Catholic Classic	(United States) Richmond, Virginia
Win	16-0	(United States) Merlin Dilone	TF 16-1	January 6, 2023	East Coast Catholic Classic	(United States) Richmond, Virginia
Win	15-0	(United States) Chase Napeloni	TF 23-7	January 6, 2023	East Coast Catholic Classic	(United States) Richmond, Virginia
2022 Powerade (gold) at 114 lb
Win	14-0	(United States) Louie Gill	TF 25-9	December 30, 2022	Powerade	(United States) Canonsburg, Pennsylvania
Win	13-0	(United States) Ethan Rivera	5-0	December 30, 2022	Powerade	(United States) Canonsburg, Pennsylvania
Win	12-0	(United States) Carter Beck	TF 22-6	December 29, 2022	Powerade	(United States) Canonsburg, Pennsylvania
Win	11-0	(United States) Tyler Tice	TF 18-3	December 29, 2022	Powerade	(United States) Canonsburg, Pennsylvania
Win	10-0	(United States) Aaron Wong	TF 19-4	December 29, 2022	Powerade	(United States) Canonsburg, Pennsylvania
2022 Barnesville Doan Ford Invitational (gold) at 120 lb
Win	9-0	(United States) Will McEwuen	TF 21-5	December 18, 2022	Barnesville Doan Ford Invitational	(United States) Barnesville, Ohio
Win	8-0	(United States) Ryan Jackson	TF 19-4	December 18, 2022	Barnesville Doan Ford Invitational	(United States) Barnesville, Ohio
Win	7-0	(United States) Ian Starkey	TF 20-4	December 18, 2022	Barnesville Doan Ford Invitational	(United States) Barnesville, Ohio
Win	6-0	(United States) Aiden Spielvogel	TF 17-2	December 17, 2022	Barnesville Doan Ford Invitational	(United States) Barnesville, Ohio
2022 Walsh Jesuit Ironman (gold) at 113 lb
Win	5-0	(United States) Beric Jordan	MD 9-0	December 10, 2022	Walsh Jesuit Ironman	(United States) Cuyahoga Falls, Ohio
Win	4-0	(United States) Anthony Mutarelli	TF 19-4	December 10, 2022	Walsh Jesuit Ironman	(United States) Cuyahoga Falls, Ohio
Win	3-0	(United States) Jayden Raney	7-3	December 9, 2022	Walsh Jesuit Ironman	(United States) Cuyahoga Falls, Ohio
Win	2-0	(United States) Kaiyon Mckinney	TF 19-4	December 9, 2022	Walsh Jesuit Ironman	(United States) Cuyahoga Falls, Ohio
Win	1-0	(United States) Sawyer Hackbarth	TF 21-5	December 9, 2022	Walsh Jesuit Ironman	(United States) Cuyahoga Falls, Ohio
Start of 2022–2023 Season (freshman year)

==== Stats ====
Season	Year	School	Rank	Weigh Class	Record	Win	Bonus
2026	Senior	Bishop McCort High School	#1 (1st)	144	44-0	100.00%	97.73%
2025	Junior	Bishop McCort High School	#1 (1st)	144	52-0	100.00%	100.00%
2024	Sophomore	Bishop McCort High School	#1 (1st)	144	56-0	100.00%	96.43%
2023	Freshman	Bishop McCort High School	#6 (6th)	138	18–0	100.00%	88.89%
Career					170–0	100.00%	97.06%

== Personal life ==
Bassett has trained in Brazilian jiu-jitsu, to help prepare for a future transition to mixed martial arts.

He is a practicing Christian.
