= 2026 U17 World Wrestling Championships =

- Host city: Baku, Azerbaijan
- Dates: 27 July – 2 August, 2026

Champions
- Freestyle: Russia
- Greco-Roman: Russia
- Women: United States

The 2026 U17 World Wrestling Championships (32nd) took place from 27 July to 2 August 2026 in Baku, Azerbaijan.

== Medal overview ==
=== Men's freestyle ===
Event	Gold	Silver	Bronze
45 kg	Nelson Villafane III; Puerto Rico	Rylen Wax; United States	Hanumant Jadhav; India
45 kg	Nelson Villafane III; Puerto Rico	Rylen Wax; United States	Mukhammad Rakhimjonov; Uzbekistan
48 kg	Bakdaulet Agabek; Kazakhstan	Aaryan; India	Volodymyr Boiko; Ukraine
48 kg	Bakdaulet Agabek; Kazakhstan	Aaryan; India	Farrukh Makhmudov; Uzbekistan
51 kg	Benyamin Ashofteh Mayvan; Iran	Ibrahim Hasanov; Azerbaijan	Masamune Ushimado; Japan
51 kg	Benyamin Ashofteh Mayvan; Iran	Ibrahim Hasanov; Azerbaijan	Islam Kurakhmaev; Russia
55 kg	Jovanni Tovar; Colombia	Jakhongir Tulkunov; Uzbekistan	Arman Elahichoran; Iran
55 kg	Jovanni Tovar; Colombia	Jakhongir Tulkunov; Uzbekistan	Prathmesh Patil; India
60 kg	Sitender; India	Sergei Karmrian; Russia	Mykyta Kuzmenko; Ukraine
60 kg	Sitender; India	Sergei Karmrian; Russia	Mardan Orynbassar; Kazakhstan
65 kg	Magomed Ibragimov; Russia	Shokhiddin Aliev; Uzbekistan	Sam Arshadghasabsaraei; Iran
65 kg	Magomed Ibragimov; Russia	Shokhiddin Aliev; Uzbekistan	Jovani Solis; Puerto Rico
71 kg	Reza Shamsipourhajivand; Iran	Bohdan Kvantaliani; Georgia	Adilet Rysbay; Kazakhstan
71 kg	Reza Shamsipourhajivand; Iran	Bohdan Kvantaliani; Georgia	Mokhmad Baisultanov; Russia
80 kg	Amirali Ferasati; Iran	Zeteny Tugyi; Hungary	Kantemir Elmesov; Russia
80 kg	Amirali Ferasati; Iran	Zeteny Tugyi; Hungary	Volkan Bilgin; Turkey
92 kg	Abdurazak Shabanov; Russia	Salah Tsarni; United States	Saksham; India
92 kg	Abdurazak Shabanov; Russia	Salah Tsarni; United States	Marshall Everett Jones; Great Britain
110 kg	Magomed Omarov; Russia	Amirhossein Esmali Yousefabad; Iran	Arush Rana; India
110 kg	Magomed Omarov; Russia	Amirhossein Esmali Yousefabad; Iran	Behruz Ashirov; Uzbekistan

=== Men's Greco-Roman ===
Event	Gold	Silver	Bronze
45 kg	Rylen Wax; United States	Ali Javadli; Azerbaijan	Ognyan Burgazov; Bulgaria
45 kg	Rylen Wax; United States	Ali Javadli; Azerbaijan	Arsan Aliev; Russia
48 kg	Soltan Iusupov; Russia	Ali Almas; Kazakhstan	Ararat Avetisyan; Armenia
48 kg	Soltan Iusupov; Russia	Ali Almas; Kazakhstan	Omar Salmanov; Azerbaijan
51 kg	Bunyod Hasanov; Uzbekistan	Abdurrahman Huseynli; Azerbaijan	Artem Tkachenko; Russia
51 kg	Bunyod Hasanov; Uzbekistan	Abdurrahman Huseynli; Azerbaijan	Gevorg Harutyunyan; Armenia
55 kg	Diyar Amanali; Kazakhstan	Keve Kovacs; Hungary	Vlad Trip; Romania
55 kg	Diyar Amanali; Kazakhstan	Keve Kovacs; Hungary	Edem Paiziev; Russia
60 kg	Amirreza Tahmasbpourmarzouni; Iran	Makhdi Barotov; Tajikistan	Elmir Charkazov; Azerbaijan
60 kg	Amirreza Tahmasbpourmarzouni; Iran	Makhdi Barotov; Tajikistan	Sadriddin Tulkinboev; Uzbekistan
65 kg	Shamil Labazanov; Russia	Ibrahim Nasibov; Ukraine	Orkhan Habibli; Azerbaijan
65 kg	Shamil Labazanov; Russia	Ibrahim Nasibov; Ukraine	Imre Juhasz; Hungary
71 kg	Janes Nazaryan; Armenia	Aslan Dzuev; Russia	Ervin Czuczor; Hungary
71 kg	Janes Nazaryan; Armenia	Aslan Dzuev; Russia	Alinur Toleugali; Kazakhstan
80 kg	Alireza Rezaei; Iran	Isfahan Hasanov; Azerbaijan	Benediktas Bubelevicius; Lithuania
80 kg	Alireza Rezaei; Iran	Isfahan Hasanov; Azerbaijan	Abdulaziz Kholmirzaev; Uzbekistan
92 kg	Tomasz Mital; Poland	Hlib Yevsieiev; Ukraine	Amirreza Mehritalarposhti; Iran
92 kg	Tomasz Mital; Poland	Hlib Yevsieiev; Ukraine	Yusuf Aksu; Turkey
110 kg	Tymofii Prykhodko; Ukraine	Bruno Pallone; United States	Aliakbar Akoo; Iran
110 kg	Tymofii Prykhodko; Ukraine	Bruno Pallone; United States	Andrej Simic; Serbia

=== Women's freestyle ===
Event	Gold	Silver	Bronze
40 kg	Natsumi Sasaki; Japan	Tasmin Athimni; Tunisia	Sophia Valdez; United States
40 kg	Natsumi Sasaki; Japan	Tasmin Athimni; Tunisia	Sirin Askara; Turkey
43 kg	Mukhlisa Masharipova; Uzbekistan	Finja Strauch; Germany	Daria Maslennikova; Russia
43 kg	Mukhlisa Masharipova; Uzbekistan	Finja Strauch; Germany	Sera Furuichi; Japan
46 kg	Kokona Makino; Japan	Sandhya Vishnoi; India	Madison Healey; United States
46 kg	Kokona Makino; Japan	Sandhya Vishnoi; India	Inzhu Bakkozha; Kazakhstan
49 kg	Saika Uchida; Japan	Olena Kolubai; Ukraine	Isla Silva; United States
49 kg	Saika Uchida; Japan	Olena Kolubai; Ukraine	Kamna Babal; India
53 kg	Marlee Solomon; United States	Akshara; India	Mariia Zhytovoz; Hungary
53 kg	Marlee Solomon; United States	Akshara; India	Rion Ogawa; Japan
57 kg	Epenesa Elison; United States	Nikita Sehtawat; India	Mariia Poltorak; Ukraine
57 kg	Epenesa Elison; United States	Nikita Sehtawat; India	Rion Suzuki; Japan
61 kg	Ozdenur Ozmez; Turkey	Landri Von Gonten; United States	Graciela Eningo Asama; Spain
61 kg	Ozdenur Ozmez; Turkey	Landri Von Gonten; United States	Avanshika; India
65 kg	Ariunzul Boldbaatar; Mongolia	Aisha Abdimalik; Kazakhstan	Palina Brahinets; Belarus
65 kg	Ariunzul Boldbaatar; Mongolia	Aisha Abdimalik; Kazakhstan	Margarita Lisita; Moldova
69 kg	Taina Fernandez; United States	Kiymet Tezcan; Turkey	Nino Samkharadze; Georgia
69 kg	Taina Fernandez; United States	Kiymet Tezcan; Turkey	Taniya; India
73 kg	Kaili Manuel; United States	Solomiia Petriv; Ukraine	Garima; India
73 kg	Kaili Manuel; United States	Solomiia Petriv; Ukraine	Aisha Williams Bautista; Panama

== Medal table ==
* Host nation (Azerbaijan)

Rank	Nation	Gold	Silver	Bronze	Total
1	United States	5	4	3	12
2	Russia	5	2	7	14
3	Iran	5	1	4	10
4	Japan	3	0	4	7
5	Uzbekistan	2	2	5	9
6	Kazakhstan	2	2	4	8
7	India	1	4	8	13
8	Ukraine	1	4	3	8
9	Turkey	1	1	3	5
10	Armenia	1	0	2	3
11	Puerto Rico	1	0	1	2
12	Colombia	1	0	0	1
12	Mongolia	1	0	0	1
12	Poland	1	0	0	1
15	Azerbaijan*	0	4	3	7
16	Hungary	0	2	3	5
17	Georgia	0	1	1	2
18	Germany	0	1	0	1
18	Tajikistan	0	1	0	1
18	Tunisia	0	1	0	1
21	Belarus	0	0	1	1
21	Bulgaria	0	0	1	1
21	Great Britain	0	0	1	1
21	Lithuania	0	0	1	1
21	Moldova	0	0	1	1
21	Panama	0	0	1	1
21	Romania	0	0	1	1
21	Serbia	0	0	1	1
21	Spain	0	0	1	1
Totals (29 entries)		30	30	60	120

== Team ranking ==
Rank	Men's freestyle		Men's Greco-Roman		Women's freestyle	
Rank	Team	Points	Team	Points	Team	Points
1	Russia	146	Russia	127	United States	167
2	Iran	145	Azerbaijan	107	India	132
3	India	123	Iran	96	Japan	126
4	Uzbekistan	101	Uzbekistan	85	Turkey	80
5	Kazakhstan	93	Ukraine	79	Ukraine	71
6	Georgia	78	United States	79	Russia	57
7	United States	68	Kazakhstan	77	Kazakhstan	55
8	Puerto Rico	50	Armenia	77	Mongolia	47
9	Ukraine	46	Hungary	70	Kyrgyzstan	40
10	Japan	35	Bulgaria	43	Uzbekistan	39
