= Omarov =

Omarov (feminine: Omarova) is a surname. Notable people with the surname include:

- Ali Omarov (born 1947), lawyer
- Anna Omarova (born 1981), Russian shot putter
- Artur Omarov (born 1988), Czech athlete
- Gadzhimurad Omarov (born 1962), Russian politician
- Gulshat Omarova (born 1968), Kazakh film director
- Hamida Omarova (born 1957), Azerbaijani actress
- Kurban Omarov (born 1980), Russian blogger
- Magomed Omarov (disambiguation), multiple people
- Saule Omarova, Kazakh-American attorney, academic, and public policy advisor
- Seitzhan Omarov (1907–1985), Kazakh writer
- Shamil Omarov (1936–2020), Russian pharmacologist
