= 2025 U17 World Wrestling Championships =

- Host city: Athens, Greece
- Dates: 28 July–3 August, 2025
- Stadium: SUNEL Arena

Champions
- Freestyle: United States
- Greco-Roman: Iran
- Women: India

The 2025 U17 World Wrestling Championships (31st) took place from 28 July to 3 August 2025 in Athens, Greece.

== Competition schedule ==
All times are (UTC+3)

Date	Time	Event
28 July	10:30	Qualification rounds GR – 48, 55, 65, 80, 110 kg
28 July	17:00	Semi-finals GR – 48, 55, 65, 80, 110 kg
29 July	10:30	Qualification rounds GR – 45, 51, 60, 71, 92 kg; Repechage GR – 48, 55, 65, 80, 110 kg
29 July	17:00	Semi-finals GR – 45, 51, 60, 71, 92 kg
29 July	19:30	Finals GR – 48, 55, 65, 80, 110 kg
30 July	10:30	Qualification rounds WW – 43, 49, 57, 65, 73 kg; Repechage GR – 45, 51, 60, 71, 92 kg
30 July	17:00	Semi-finals WW – 43, 49, 57, 65, 73 kg
30 July	19:30	Finals GR – 45, 51, 60, 71, 92 kg
31 July	10:30	Qualification rounds WW – 40, 46, 53, 61, 69 kg; Repechage WW – 43, 49, 57, 65, 73 kg
31 July	17:00	Semi-finals WW – 40, 46, 53, 61, 69 kg
31 July	19:30	Finals WW – 43, 49, 57, 65, 73 kg
1 August	10:30	Qualification rounds FS – 48, 55, 65, 80, 110 kg; Repechage WW – 40, 46, 53, 61, 69 kg
1 August	17:00	Semi-finals FS – 48, 55, 65, 80, 110 kg
1 August	19:30	Finals WW – 40, 46, 53, 61, 69 kg
2 August	10:30	Qualification rounds FS – 45, 51, 60, 71, 92 kg; Repechage FS – 48, 55, 65, 80, 110 kg
2 August	17:00	Semi-finals FS – 45, 51, 60, 71, 92 kg
2 August	19:30	Finals FS – 48, 55, 65, 80, 110 kg
3 August	16:00	Repechage FS – 45, 51, 60, 71, 92 kg
3 August	18:00	Finals FS – 45, 51, 60, 71, 92 kg

== Medal table ==
* Host nation (Greece)

Rank	Nation	Gold	Silver	Bronze	Total
1	United States	6	2	9	17
2	Uzbekistan	5	3	1	9
3	India	4	4	1	9
4	China	3	1	0	4
5	Japan	2	3	2	7
6	Kazakhstan	2	2	7	11
–	United World Wrestling	2	1	9	12
7	Azerbaijan	2	1	4	7
8	Iran	1	6	6	13
9	Kyrgyzstan	1	2	4	7
10	Armenia	1	0	3	4
11	Ukraine	1	0	2	3
12	Georgia	0	2	1	3
13	Hungary	0	1	2	3
14	Germany	0	1	1	2
14	Greece*	0	1	1	2
16	Turkey	0	0	3	3
17	Tajikistan	0	0	2	2
18	Moldova	0	0	1	1
18	Norway	0	0	1	1
Totals (19 entries)		30	30	60	120

== Team ranking ==
Rank	Men's freestyle		Men's Greco-Roman		Women's freestyle	
Rank	Team	Points	Team	Points	Team	Points
1	United States	154	Iran	125	India	151
2	Iran	150	Uzbekistan	118	United States	142
3	Kazakhstan	91	Kazakhstan	113	Japan	113
4	Azerbaijan	90	Kyrgyzstan	100	China	107
5	Japan	79	Azerbaijan	100	Kazakhstan	69
6	Uzbekistan	79	Georgia	77	Hungary	62
7	India	59	Turkey	64	Germany	51
8	Kyrgyzstan	56	Ukraine	61	Uzbekistan	45
9	Ukraine	49	Armenia	55	Kyrgyzstan	35
10	Georgia	38	United States	53	Ukraine	31

== Medal overview ==
=== Men's freestyle ===
Event	Gold	Silver	Bronze
45 kg	Keegan Bassett; United States	Parsa Tahmasbi; Iran	Ibragim Veliullov; United World Wrestling
45 kg	Keegan Bassett; United States	Parsa Tahmasbi; Iran	Mirjalol Mukammilov; Uzbekistan
48 kg	Ariah Mills; United States	Sina Javad Abbas; Iran	Islam Rabadanov; United World Wrestling
48 kg	Ariah Mills; United States	Sina Javad Abbas; Iran	Dovudbek Bakhadirov; Kyrgyzstan
51 kg	Samuel Reyes Sánchez; United States	Ulugbek Rashidov; Uzbekistan	Dzhamal Bakaev; United World Wrestling
51 kg	Samuel Reyes Sánchez; United States	Ulugbek Rashidov; Uzbekistan	Danael Abdykassym; Kazakhstan
55 kg	Jinnosuke Okonogi; Japan	Abdumalik Jaloldinov; Uzbekistan	Chingis Saryglar; United World Wrestling
55 kg	Jinnosuke Okonogi; Japan	Abdumalik Jaloldinov; Uzbekistan	Greyton Burnett; United States
60 kg	Sitender; India	Rihito Hiura; Japan	Hasan Hasanov; Azerbaijan
60 kg	Sitender; India	Rihito Hiura; Japan	Bekassyl Assambek; Kazakhstan
65 kg	Huseyn Ismayilov; Azerbaijan	Arseni Kikiniou; United States	Adisbek Altynbekov; Kyrgyzstan
65 kg	Huseyn Ismayilov; Azerbaijan	Arseni Kikiniou; United States	Morteza Mohammadi; Iran
71 kg	Jayden James; United States	Arsham Kandbon; Iran	Yeghishe Mosesyan; Armenia
71 kg	Jayden James; United States	Arsham Kandbon; Iran	Ayubjon Bozorzoda; Tajikistan
80 kg	Artur Kostiuk; Ukraine	Mohammad Parsa Karami; Iran	Issa Zangiev; United World Wrestling
80 kg	Artur Kostiuk; Ukraine	Mohammad Parsa Karami; Iran	Dinmukhammed Kassymbek; Kazakhstan
92 kg	David Dzebisov; United World Wrestling	Amirali Alizadeh; Iran	Tanner Hodgins; United States
92 kg	David Dzebisov; United World Wrestling	Amirali Alizadeh; Iran	Said Pashayev; Azerbaijan
110 kg	Magomedrasul Omarov; United World Wrestling	Lacky; India	Amir Hossein Naghdali; Iran
110 kg	Magomedrasul Omarov; United World Wrestling	Lacky; India	Hakim Taghiyev; Azerbaijan

=== Men's Greco-Roman ===
Event	Gold	Silver	Bronze
45 kg	Kuanyshbek Zhangazhol; Kazakhstan	Nurkerim Kumarbekov; Kyrgyzstan	Abdurrahman Huseynli; Azerbaijan
45 kg	Kuanyshbek Zhangazhol; Kazakhstan	Nurkerim Kumarbekov; Kyrgyzstan	Vadim Tarelunga; Moldova
48 kg	Bunyod Hasanov; Uzbekistan	Nurdaulet Kumaruly; Kazakhstan	Michael Rundell; United States
48 kg	Bunyod Hasanov; Uzbekistan	Nurdaulet Kumaruly; Kazakhstan	Amir Mohammad Hajivand; Iran
51 kg	Otabek Tursunov; Uzbekistan	Hikmat Hagverdiyev; Azerbaijan	Marat Atshemyan; Armenia
51 kg	Otabek Tursunov; Uzbekistan	Hikmat Hagverdiyev; Azerbaijan	Abu Bakar Saga; Norway
55 kg	Alkham Abdirasulov; Kyrgyzstan	Nurali Askar; Kazakhstan	Amir Reza Tahmasbpour; Iran
55 kg	Alkham Abdirasulov; Kyrgyzstan	Nurali Askar; Kazakhstan	Makhdi Barotov; Tajikistan
60 kg	Ali Nazarov; Azerbaijan	Amangeldi Ysakbaev; Kyrgyzstan	Abolfazl Zare; Iran
60 kg	Ali Nazarov; Azerbaijan	Amangeldi Ysakbaev; Kyrgyzstan	Zaven Mezhlumyan; Armenia
65 kg	Janes Nazaryan; Armenia	Erekle Tavberidze; Georgia	Dosbol Shamil; Kazakhstan
65 kg	Janes Nazaryan; Armenia	Erekle Tavberidze; Georgia	Arseni Kikiniou; United States
71 kg	Behruzbek Valiev; Uzbekistan	Dimitrios Soulis; Greece	Mohammad Kazemi; Iran
71 kg	Behruzbek Valiev; Uzbekistan	Dimitrios Soulis; Greece	Marlen Meirbekuly; Kazakhstan
80 kg	Abdulaziz Kholmirzaev; Uzbekistan	Luka Martiashvili; Georgia	İsmail Bereket; Turkey
80 kg	Abdulaziz Kholmirzaev; Uzbekistan	Luka Martiashvili; Georgia	Nurislam Oskonbaev; Kyrgyzstan
92 kg	Amirsam Mohammadi; Iran	Kanstantsin Kasyan; United World Wrestling	Ahmet Enes Uzun; Turkey
92 kg	Amirsam Mohammadi; Iran	Kanstantsin Kasyan; United World Wrestling	David Calkins; United States
110 kg	Hardeep; India	Yazdan Reza Delrouz; Iran	Temuri Simsive; Georgia
110 kg	Hardeep; India	Yazdan Reza Delrouz; Iran	Anatoli Novachenko; Ukraine

=== Women's freestyle ===
Event	Gold	Silver	Bronze
40 kg	Shokhista Shonazarova; Uzbekistan	An Nakanishi; Japan	Asema Asangaryeva; Kyrgyzstan
40 kg	Shokhista Shonazarova; Uzbekistan	An Nakanishi; Japan	Maisie Elliott; United States
43 kg	Rachana; India	Xin Huang; China	Inzhu Bakkozha; Kazakhstan
43 kg	Rachana; India	Xin Huang; China	Madison Healey; United States
46 kg	Hanano Oya; Japan	Janka Sillei; Hungary	Jaclyn Bouzakis; United States
46 kg	Hanano Oya; Japan	Janka Sillei; Hungary	Maria Gkika; Greece
49 kg	Morgan Turner; United States	Yu Kataoka; Japan	Polina Bochkareva; United World Wrestling
49 kg	Morgan Turner; United States	Yu Kataoka; Japan	Komal Verma; India
53 kg	Jiaqing Jiang; China	Epenesa Elison; United States	Rion Ogawa; Japan
53 kg	Jiaqing Jiang; China	Epenesa Elison; United States	Mariia Zhytovoz; Hungary
57 kg	Madkhiya Usmanova; Kazakhstan	Moni; India	Alina Baroeva; United World Wrestling
57 kg	Madkhiya Usmanova; Kazakhstan	Moni; India	Sayuki Tanada; Japan
61 kg	Taina Fernandez; United States	Yashita; India	Barbara Bager; Hungary
61 kg	Taina Fernandez; United States	Yashita; India	Zalina Totrova; United World Wrestling
65 kg	Ashvini Vishnoi; India	Mukhayyo Rakhimjonova; Uzbekistan	Lilia Ermokhina; United World Wrestling
65 kg	Ashvini Vishnoi; India	Mukhayyo Rakhimjonova; Uzbekistan	Feenja Herman; Germany
69 kg	Min Zhao; China	Ayla Şahin; Germany	Solomiia Petriv; Ukraine
69 kg	Min Zhao; China	Ayla Şahin; Germany	Shakhizada Dauletzhan; Kazakhstan
73 kg	Wenjin Qiu; China	Kajal; India	Eylem Engin; Turkey
73 kg	Wenjin Qiu; China	Kajal; India	Ella Jo Poalillo; United States

== Participating nations ==
676 wrestlers from 52 nations:

- Algeria (9)
- Armenia (20)
- Austria (4)
- Azerbaijan (23)
- Brazil (6)
- Bulgaria (24)
- Canada (12)
- China (27)
- Croatia (13)
- Cyprus (2)
- Czech Republic (4)
- Egypt (9)
- Spain (7)
- Estonia (4)
- Finland (3)
- France (5)
- United Kingdom (2)
- Georgia (23)
- Germany (11)
- Greece (29)
- Guatemala (1)
- Hungary (17)
- India (28)
- Iran (20)
- Israel (9)
- Italy (10)
- Japan (30)
- Kazakhstan (29)
- Kyrgyzstan (28)
- Kosovo (2)
- Lithuania (6)
- Morocco (1)
- Moldova (16)
- Mexico (7)
- North Macedonia (1)
- Mongolia (9)
- Netherlands (2)
- Norway (4)
- Poland (19)
- Puerto Rico (13)
- Romania (18)
- South Africa (5)
- Serbia (6)
- Switzerland (4)
- Slovakia (3)
- Tajikistan (7)
- Turkmenistan (4)
- Chinese Taipei (6)
- Turkey (30)
- Ukraine (30)
- United States (30)
- Uzbekistan (23)
- United World Wrestling (Russia+Belarus) (43)
