= 2026 U20 World Wrestling Championships =

- Host city: Bratislava, Slovakia
- Dates: 16–23 August
- Stadium: Mladost Sports Hall

Champions
- Freestyle: United States
- Greco-Roman: Russia
- Women: Japan

The 2026 U20 World Wrestling Championships were the 45th edition of the U20 World Wrestling Championships and were held in Bratislava, Slovakia, between 16 and 23 August 2026.

== Competition schedule ==
All times are (UTC+3)

Date	Time	Event
17 August	10.00	Qualification rounds FS 70-74-97-125 kg
17 August	18:00	Semi Finals FS 70-74-97-125 kg
18 August	10.00	Qualification rounds FS 57-65-79-92 kg; Repechages FS 70-74-97-125 kg
18 August	17:15	Semi Finals FS 57-65-79-92 kg
18 August	18:00	Finals FS 70-74-97-125 kg
19 August	10.00	Qualification rounds FS 61-86 WW 57-59-68 kg; Repechages FS 57-65-79-92 kg
19 August	16:45	Semi Finals FS 61-86 WW 57-59-68 kg
19 August	18:00	Finals FS 57-65-79-92 kg
20 August	10.00	Qualification rounds WW 55-62-65-76 kg; Repechages FS 61-86 WW 57-59-68 kg
20 August	16:45	Semi Finals WW 55-62-65-76 kg
20 August	18:00	Finals FS 61-86 WW 57-59-68 kg
21 August	10.00	Qualification rounds GR 60–82 kg WW 50-53-72 kg; Repechages WW 55-62-65-76 kg
21 August	16:45	Semi Finals GR 60–82 kg WW 50-53-72 kg
21 August	18:00	Finals WW 55-62-65-76 kg
22 August	10.00	Qualification rounds GR 55-67-72-97 kg; Repechages GR 60–82 kg WW 50-53-72 kg
22 August	16:45	Semi Finals GR 55-67-72-97 kg
22 August	18:00	Finals GR 60–82 kg WW 50-53-72 kg
23 August	10.00	Qualification rounds GR 63-77-87-130 kg; Repechages GR 55-67-72-97 kg
23 August	16:45	Semi Finals GR 63-77-87-130 kg
23 August	18:00	Finals GR 55-67-72-97 kg
24 August	16.00	Repechages GR 63-77-87-130 kg
24 August	18:00	Finals GR 63-77-87-130 kg

== Medal table ==
* Host nation (Slovakia)

Rank	Nation	Gold	Silver	Bronze	Total
1	Japan	7	3	3	13
2	Russia	6	5	6	17
3	United States	5	3	7	15
4	Iran	3	1	5	9
5	Azerbaijan	1	4	4	9
6	India	1	3	2	6
7	Uzbekistan	1	2	4	7
8	China	1	1	5	7
9	Armenia	1	1	3	5
10	Georgia	1	1	2	4
10	Kazakhstan	1	1	2	4
12	Ukraine	1	0	4	5
13	Canada	1	0	0	1
14	Belarus	0	2	0	2
15	Hungary	0	1	4	5
16	Turkey	0	1	2	3
17	Venezuela	0	1	0	1
18	Finland	0	0	2	2
19	Egypt	0	0	1	1
19	Kyrgyzstan	0	0	1	1
19	Romania	0	0	1	1
19	Sweden	0	0	1	1
19	Turkmenistan	0	0	1	1
Totals (23 entries)		30	30	60	120

== Team ranking ==
Rank	Men's freestyle		Men's Greco-Roman		Women's freestyle	
Rank	Team	Points	Team	Points	Team	Points
1	United States	205	Russia	142	Japan	167
2	Russia	155	Iran	109	India	133
3	Japan	130	Uzbekistan	95	China	132
4	Iran	103	Armenia	91	United States	118
5	Kazakhstan	82	Azerbaijan	90	Russia	107
6	Azerbaijan	67	Georgia	85	Ukraine	55
7	Georgia	64	Hungary	75	Azerbaijan	50
8	Ukraine	52	Ukraine	56	Uzbekistan	50
9	Turkey	48	Kazakhstan	55	Turkey	46
10	Kyrgyzstan	43	Japan	49	Hungary	45

== Medal summary ==
=== Men's freestyle ===
Event	Gold	Silver	Bronze
57 kg	Magomed Magomedov; Russia	Isaiah Cortez; United States	Yamato Ogawa; Japan
57 kg	Magomed Magomedov; Russia	Isaiah Cortez; United States	Nurassyl Assambek; Kazakhstan
61 kg	Aaron Seidel; United States	Bekassyl Assambek; Kazakhstan	Ahoura Khateri; Iran
61 kg	Aaron Seidel; United States	Bekassyl Assambek; Kazakhstan	Zelimkhan Chaniev; Russia
65 kg	Bo Bassett; United States	Takuto Osedo; Japan	Isa Isakov; Kyrgyzstan
65 kg	Bo Bassett; United States	Takuto Osedo; Japan	Zalimkhan Umarov; Russia
70 kg	Sina Khalili; Iran	Haji Karimov; Azerbaijan	Landon Robideau; United States
70 kg	Sina Khalili; Iran	Haji Karimov; Azerbaijan	Davit Davtyan; Armenia
74 kg	Ariya Yoshida; Japan	Jayden James; United States	Ivan Zalisko; Ukraine
74 kg	Ariya Yoshida; Japan	Jayden James; United States	Nurdaulet Seilbekov; Kazakhstan
79 kg	Ismail Khaniev; Russia	Keyvan Gharehdaghi; Japan	Ryan Burton; United States
79 kg	Ismail Khaniev; Russia	Keyvan Gharehdaghi; Japan	Bohdan Oleksiienko; Ukraine
86 kg	Aeoden Sinclair; United States	Akhmad Mukutov; Russia	Natsura Okazawa; Japan
86 kg	Aeoden Sinclair; United States	Akhmad Mukutov; Russia	Alp Arslan Begenjow; Turkmenistan
92 kg	Sandro Kurashvili; Georgia	Abolfazl Rahmani; Iran	Darius Sas; Romania
92 kg	Sandro Kurashvili; Georgia	Abolfazl Rahmani; Iran	Jimmy Mastny; United States
97 kg	Michael Boyle; United States	Rodion Sanakoev; Russia	Konstantine Petriashvili; Georgia
97 kg	Michael Boyle; United States	Rodion Sanakoev; Russia	Noah Leibowitz; Japan
125 kg	Abolfazl Mohammadnejad; Iran	Dreshaun Ross; United States	Soslan Gabuev; Russia
125 kg	Abolfazl Mohammadnejad; Iran	Dreshaun Ross; United States	Yusif Dursunov; Azerbaijan

=== Men's Greco-Roman ===
Event	Gold	Silver	Bronze
55 kg	Armin Shamsipour; Iran	Koba Karumidze; Georgia	Emin Javadli; Azerbaijan
55 kg	Armin Shamsipour; Iran	Koba Karumidze; Georgia	Khojiakbar Kuchkarov; Uzbekistan
60 kg	Aykhan Javadov; Azerbaijan	Dostonbek Oripov; Uzbekistan	Amir Ali Heidari; Iran
60 kg	Aykhan Javadov; Azerbaijan	Dostonbek Oripov; Uzbekistan	Ilia Paniutin; Russia
63 kg	Kuvonchbek Ismoilov; Uzbekistan	Salim Kazmakhov; Russia	Tural Ahmadov; Azerbaijan
63 kg	Kuvonchbek Ismoilov; Uzbekistan	Salim Kazmakhov; Russia	Ali Gharibi; Iran
67 kg	Kazybek Kalmagambetov; Kazakhstan	Mikhail Markouski; Belarus	Petro Zhytovoz; Hungary
67 kg	Kazybek Kalmagambetov; Kazakhstan	Mikhail Markouski; Belarus	Yurik Mkhitaryan; Armenia
72 kg	Mingiian Goriaev; Russia	Salih Yusuf Yazici; Turkey	Behruzbek Valiev; Uzbekistan
72 kg	Mingiian Goriaev; Russia	Salih Yusuf Yazici; Turkey	Mohamed Ibrahim; Egypt
77 kg	Samvel Terteryan; Armenia	Javidan Nahmatov; Azerbaijan	Amir Mehdi Saeidi Nava; Iran
77 kg	Samvel Terteryan; Armenia	Javidan Nahmatov; Azerbaijan	Zalán Toplak; Hungary
82 kg	Ramazan Nekhai; Russia	Kiryl Valeuski; Belarus	Elmin Aliyev; Azerbaijan
82 kg	Ramazan Nekhai; Russia	Kiryl Valeuski; Belarus	Szabolcs Szinay; Hungary
87 kg	Taizo Yoshida; Japan	Iurik Petrosian; Armenia	Amir Hossein Nematzadeh; Iran
87 kg	Taizo Yoshida; Japan	Iurik Petrosian; Armenia	Aidan Squier; United States
97 kg	Yehor Yakushenko; Ukraine	Ilia Komarov; Russia	Pauli Perkioe; Finland
97 kg	Yehor Yakushenko; Ukraine	Ilia Komarov; Russia	Erik Ter Matevosyan; Armenia
130 kg	Ali Iliasov; Russia	László Koppány; Hungary	Ivan Yankovskyi; Ukraine
130 kg	Ali Iliasov; Russia	László Koppány; Hungary	Saba Purtseladze; Georgia

=== Women's freestyle ===
Event	Gold	Silver	Bronze
50 kg	Yuu Katsume; Japan	Margarita Iarygina; Russia	Morgan Turner; United States
50 kg	Yuu Katsume; Japan	Margarita Iarygina; Russia	Nilufar Nurmukhammadova; Uzbekistan
53 kg	Kaura Coles; Canada	Alexa Álvarez; Venezuela	Li Yuxuan; China
53 kg	Kaura Coles; Canada	Alexa Álvarez; Venezuela	Sakibjamal Esbosynova; Uzbekistan
55 kg	Everest Leydecker; United States	Nana Kozuka; Japan	Zhou Meilin; China
55 kg	Everest Leydecker; United States	Nana Kozuka; Japan	Sara Rantonen; Finland
57 kg	Konami Ono; Japan	Hiunai Hurbanova; Azerbaijan	Wang Xinyu; China
57 kg	Konami Ono; Japan	Hiunai Hurbanova; Azerbaijan	Tanvi Magdum; India
59 kg	Sae Noguchi; Japan	Ruzanna Mammadova; Azerbaijan	Komal; India
59 kg	Sae Noguchi; Japan	Ruzanna Mammadova; Azerbaijan	Caley Graber; United States
62 kg	Sakura Onishi; Japan	Savita; India	Barbara Báger; Hungary
62 kg	Sakura Onishi; Japan	Savita; India	Özdenur Özmez; Turkey
65 kg	Margarita Salnazarian; Russia	Mukhayyo Narzilloeva; Uzbekistan	Ma Zhengwei; China
65 kg	Margarita Salnazarian; Russia	Mukhayyo Narzilloeva; Uzbekistan	Saga Svensson; Sweden
68 kg	Song Chenling; China	Mansi Lather; India	Taina Fernandez; United States
68 kg	Song Chenling; China	Mansi Lather; India	Oleksandra Rybak; Ukraine
72 kg	Chisato Yoshida; Japan	Tanu Sharma; India	Liliana Kazmina; Russia
72 kg	Chisato Yoshida; Japan	Tanu Sharma; India	Qiu Wenjin; China
76 kg	Kajal Dhochak; India	Sun Jingru; China	Elmira Yasin; Turkey
76 kg	Kajal Dhochak; India	Sun Jingru; China	Diana Titova; Russia

== Participating nations ==
648 wrestlers from 56 countries:

- Angola (1)
- Armenia (19)
- Austria (3)
- Azerbaijan (23)
- Bosnia and Herzegovina (1)
- Brazil (5)
- Bulgaria (23)
- Canada (18)
- Chile (1)
- Croatia (6)
- Czech Republic (3)
- China (30)
- Costa Rica (1)
- Ecuador (1)
- Egypt (6)
- Spain (4)
- Estonia (5)
- Finland (5)
- France (9)
- United Kingdom (1)
- Georgia (20)
- Germany (10)
- Greece (12)
- Hungary (21)
- India (30)
- Iran (20)
- Israel (5)
- Italy (7)
- Japan (30)
- Kazakhstan (29)
- Kyrgyzstan (24)
- South Korea (7)
- Kosovo (3)
- Lithuania (6)
- Morocco (2)
- Moldova (16)
- Mexico (4)
- Mongolia (9)
- North Macedonia (2)
- Netherlands (3)
- Norway (2)
- New Zealand (1)
- Philippines (1)
- Poland (16)
- Puerto Rico (2)
- Russia (30)
- Serbia (8)
- Switzerland (3)
- Slovenia (20) (Host)
- Sweden (7)
- Turkmenistan (6)
- Chinese Taipei (5)
- Turkey (30)
- Ukraine (29)
- United States (30)
- Uzbekistan (17)
