= 2021 U17 Pan American Wrestling Championships =

- Host city: (Mexico) Oaxtepec
- Dates: 9–13 June 2021

Champions
- Freestyle: United States
- Greco-Roman: United States
- Women: United States

The 2021 U17 Pan American Wrestling Championships was held from 9 to 13 June in Oaxtepec, Mexico.

== Medal summary ==
=== Men's freestyle ===
Event	Gold	Silver	Bronze
45 kg	Bowen Bassett; United States	Samir Marciaga Yau; Panama	Roger Kantun Ku; Mexico
48 kg	Luke Lilledahl; United States	Jonathan Meza Rayas; Mexico	Abel Sanchez Juarez; Peru
51 kg	Alan Koehler; United States	Jesse Perez Verastegui; Mexico	Pedro Toribio Torres; Peru
55 kg	Kael Lauridsen; United States	Josue Villareal Martinez; Mexico	Jailson Leite Da Silva; Brazil
60 kg	Brock Bobzien; United States	Fernando Saldarriaga Velasquez; Ecuador	Alan Gomez Hermosillo; Mexico
65 kg	Pierson Manville; United States	Paulo Goncalves Da Silva; Brazil	Marco Fernandez Cubas; Peru
71 kg	Thor Michaelson; United States	Carlos Serrano Lopez; Mexico	Dario Cubas Castillo; Peru
80 kg	Ryder Rogotzke; United States	Alexander Cusinga Gomez; Peru	Miguel Gonzalez Gomez; Mexico
92 kg	Peter Casale Jr; United States	Alan Perez Uribe; Mexico	Not awarded
110 kg	James Mullen III; United States	Rhian Cavalini Engel; Brazil	Angel Ramirez Navarro; Mexico

=== Men's Greco-Roman ===
Event	Gold	Silver	Bronze
45 kg	Bowen Bassett; United States	Roger Kantun Ku; Mexico	Joao Amorim de Moura; Brazil
48 kg	Luke Lilledahl; United States	Abel Sanchez Juarez; Peru	Marco Garcia Alvarez; Mexico
51 kg	Alan Koehler; United States	Yan Landim Ribeiro; Brazil	Pedro Toribio Torres; Peru
55 kg	Kael Lauridsen; United States	Diego Terriquez Ibarra; Mexico	Patrick Rodriguez Quinto; Ecuador
60 kg	Brock Bobzien; United States	Edwin Allain Miranda; Peru	Joao Da Silva Neto; Brazil
65 kg	Pierson Manville; United States	Marco Fernandez Cubas; Peru	Oliver Plascencia Estrada; Mexico
71 kg	Thor Michaelson; United States	Isacc Tenorio Mosquera; Ecuador	Hector Loera Rojas; Mexico
80 kg	Ryder Rogotzke; United States	Enrique Olvera Rodriguez; Mexico	Not awarded
92 kg	Peter Casale Jr; United States	Mateus Freier Santos; Brazil	Ivan Coronado Garcia; Mexico
110 kg	James Mullen III; United States	Alan Perez Uribe; Mexico	Not awarded

=== Women ===
Event	Gold	Silver	Bronze
40 kg	Gabrielle Bragg; United States	Veronica Amaro Garcia; Mexico	Not awarded
43 kg	Emilie Gonzalez; United States	Vicky Leon Gomez; Ecuador	Ana Palacios Hernandez; Mexico
46 kg	Brianna Gonzalez; United States	Yusneiry Agrazal West; Panama	Jaren Osorio Ixpata; Guatemala
49 kg	Faith Cole; United States	Yorlenis Morgan Sanchez; Panama	Danna Martinez Ordonez; Mexico
53 kg	Jaclyn Dehney; United States	Jelissa Hernandez Gomez; Mexico	Ashly Iboy Escobar; Guatemala
57 kg	Bertha Rojas Chavez; Mexico	Alexis Janiak; United States	Leonela Gruezo Ortiz; Ecuador
61 kg	Marissa Jimenez; United States	Camila Roa Ortega; Peru	Makayla Browne; Barbados
65 kg	Melanie Jimenez Villalba; Mexico	Madeline Kubicki; United States	Juliana Neper Oliveira Santos; Brazil
69 kg	Debanhi Tapia Garcia; Mexico	Margaret Graham; United States	Nataly Ovando Rojas; Chile
73 kg	Rose Cassioppi; United States	Karime Cortes Resendiz; Mexico	Maria de Almeida dos Santos; Brazil

== Medal table ==
* Host nation (Mexico)

Rank	Nation	Gold	Silver	Bronze	Total
1	United States	27	3	0	30
2	Mexico*	3	12	10	25
3	Peru	0	5	5	10
4	Brazil	0	4	5	9
5	Ecuador	0	3	2	5
6	Panama	0	3	0	3
7	Guatemala	0	0	2	2
8	Barbados	0	0	1	1
8	Chile	0	0	1	1
Totals (9 entries)		30	30	26	86

== Team ranking ==
Rank	Men's freestyle		Men's Greco-Roman		Women's freestyle	
Rank	Team	Points	Team	Points	Team	Points
1	United States	250	United States	250	United States	235
2	Mexico	170	Mexico	152	Mexico	165
3	Peru	80	Peru	87	Brazil	52
4	Brazil	79	Brazil	80	Peru	44
5	Panama	32	Ecuador	35	Panama	40
6	Guatemala	24	Panama	22	Guatemala	40
7	Chile	22	Chile Guatemala	12	Ecuador	35
8	Ecuador	20	—N/a		Chile	25
9	Barbados	12	El Salvador	10	Barbados	15
10	Paraguay	10			Puerto Rico	12
