= Jayden Raney =

American wrestler (born 2007)

Personal information
- Full name: Jayden Scott Raney
- Born: March 1, 2007 (age 19) Sturgis, Kentucky, U.S.

Sport
- Country: United States
- Sport: Wrestling
- Events: Greco-Roman, Freestyle and Folkstyle
- College team: Oklahoma State
- Club: Cowboy RTC
- Team: USA
- Coached by: David Taylor
Medal record
Men's Greco-Roman wrestling
Representing the United States
Pan American Championships
Gold medal – first place	2025 Monterrey	55 kg
U17 World Championships
Gold medal – first place	2024 Amman	55 kg

Jayden Scott Raney (born March 1, 2007) is an American Greco-Roman, freestyle and folkstyle wrestler. In 2024, Raney won a U17 Greco-Roman World championship at 55 kg. While still in high school, he qualified for his first senior level World Team in 2025 in Greco-Roman at 55 kg, where he finished seventh at the 2025 World Championships.

== Wrestling career ==
=== High school ===
Raney wrestled alongside his twin brother Jordyn at Union County High School in Morganfield, Kentucky. Jayden was a five-time Kentucky High School Athletic Association (KHSAA) state champion, one of only the three wrestlers in Kentucky history to do so. Both him and his brother Jordyn, were also honored with the 2026 Dave Schultz High School Excellence Award for the state of Kentucky.

=== College ===
Both Jayden and his brother Jordyn committed and signed with Oklahoma State for collegiate wrestling, where they are coached by David Taylor.

=== Senior level ===
While still in high school, Jayden won the senior level representative spot for the United States in Greco-Roman wrestling at 55 kg at the 2025 World Championships. At the 2025 World Championships, Raney finished seventh. In 2025, he also won a gold medal at the Pan American Championships.

== Personal life ==
Raney has a twin brother, Jordyn, who is also a wrestler. They both committed to Oklahoma State for collegiate wrestling, where they are teammates.
