= Matt Bradley (American football) =

American football player (1960–2002)

No. 48
- Position: Linebacker

Personal information
- Born: May 20, 1960; Johnstown, Pennsylvania, U.S.
- Died: 2002 (aged 41–42)
- Listed height: 6 ft 2 in (1.88 m)
- Listed weight: 233 lb (106 kg)

Career information
- High school: Bishop McCort (Johnstown)
- College: Penn State
- NFL draft: 1982: 9th round, 234th overall pick

Career history
- Houston Oilers (1982)*; Philadelphia Stars (1983); Boston Breakers (1983); Pittsburgh Maulers (1984)*
- * Offseason or practice squad member only

Matthew Bradley (May 20, 1960 – 2002) was an American professional football linebacker who played one season in the United States Football League (USFL) with the Philadelphia Stars and Boston Breakers. He was drafted by the Houston Oilers in the ninth round of the 1982 NFL draft after playing college football at Penn State University.

== Early life ==
Matthew Bradley was born on May 20, 1960, in Johnstown, Pennsylvania. He played high school football at Bishop McCort High School in Johnstown. He was a first-team Associated Press All-State selection his senior year in 1977.

== College career ==
Bradley played for the Penn State Nittany Lions from 1978 to 1981.

== Professional career ==
Bradley was selected by the Houston Oilers in the ninth round with the 234th overall pick in the 1982 NFL draft. He was released by the Oilers on August 2, 1982.

Bradley signed with the Philadelphia Stars of the United States Football League (USFL) on February 19, 1983. He was released on April 20, 1983, before playing in any games.

Bradley was signed by the USFL's Boston Breakers on May 4, 1983. He played in eight games for the Breakers during the 1983 season.

On September 6, 1983, Bradley was selected by the Pittsburgh Maulers in the USFL expansion draft. He was released in late January 1984.

== Personal life ==
Bradley's father, Sam, played basketball at the University of Pittsburgh. His older brother Jim was a captain and linebacker at Penn State from 1973 to 1974, was a member of the Cincinnati Bengals, and is the long-time team surgeon for the Pittsburgh Steelers. His older brother Tom played for the Nittany Lions from 1975 to 1978. His two sisters Patty and Cassy were All-American track athletes at Villanova University.

== Death ==
Bradley died of an esophageal ailment in 2002.
