= 2021 World Cadets Wrestling Championships =

2021 U17 World Wrestling Championships
- Host city: Budapest, Hungary
- Dates: 19–25 July 2021

Champions
- Freestyle: India
- Greco-Roman: Georgia
- Women: United States

The 2021 U17 World Wrestling Championships (26th) took place from June 19 to 25 in Budapest, Hungary.

== Medal table ==
Rank	Nation	Gold	Silver	Bronze	Total
1	United States	5	4	5	14
2	India	5	1	7	13
3	Russia	4	6	8	18
4	Ukraine	3	3	3	9
5	Iran	3	2	2	7
6	Georgia	2	2	4	8
7	Turkey	2	1	5	8
8	Kyrgyzstan	2	0	2	4
9	Belarus	1	2	3	6
9	Uzbekistan	1	2	3	6
11	Hungary	1	0	3	4
12	Moldova	1	0	0	1
13	Azerbaijan	0	1	7	8
14	Kazakhstan	0	1	4	5
15	Bulgaria	0	1	1	2
16	Germany	0	1	0	1
16	Romania	0	1	0	1
16	Sweden	0	1	0	1
16	Switzerland	0	1	0	1
20	Armenia	0	0	1	1
20	Czech Republic	0	0	1	1
20	Greece	0	0	1	1
Totals (22 entries)		30	30	60	120

== Team ranking ==
Rank	Men's freestyle		Men's Greco-Roman		Women's freestyle	
Rank	Team	Points	Team	Points	Team	Points
1	India	147	Georgia	141	United States	149
2	United States	143	Ukraine	127	India	139
3	Russia	140	Russia	124	Russia	134
4	Iran	116	Kyrgyzstan	87	Turkey	111
5	Kazakhstan	101	Iran	81	Belarus	95

== Medal summary ==
=== Men's freestyle ===
Event	Gold	Silver	Bronze
45 kg	(United States) Bowen Bassett	(Russia) Alikhan Ashinov	(Uzbekistan) Umidjon Iskandarov
45 kg	(United States) Bowen Bassett	(Russia) Alikhan Ashinov	(Kyrgyzstan) Imronbek Rakhmanov
48 kg	(India) Aman Gulia	(United States) Luke Lilledahl	(Armenia) Sargis Begoyan
48 kg	(India) Aman Gulia	(United States) Luke Lilledahl	(Kazakhstan) Nurdanat Aitanov
51 kg	(Iran) Ali Khorramdel	(Uzbekistan) Nodirbek Jumanazarov	(India) Chirag Chirag
51 kg	(Iran) Ali Khorramdel	(Uzbekistan) Nodirbek Jumanazarov	(United States) Nathanael John Jesuroga
55 kg	(Russia) Magomed Baitukaev	(Kazakhstan) Abdinur Nurlanbek	(Turkey) Abdullah Toprak
55 kg	(Russia) Magomed Baitukaev	(Kazakhstan) Abdinur Nurlanbek	(Azerbaijan) Javid Javadov
60 kg	(Uzbekistan) Kamronbek Kadamov	(India) Singh Jaskaran	(Azerbaijan) Abdurrahman İbrahimov
60 kg	(Uzbekistan) Kamronbek Kadamov	(India) Singh Jaskaran	(Hungary) Alex Gabor Gombos
65 kg	(United States) Meyer Schapiroo	(Georgia (country)) Giorgi Gogritchiani	(Iran) Ali Rezaei
65 kg	(United States) Meyer Schapiroo	(Georgia (country)) Giorgi Gogritchiani	(Russia) Khabib Zavurbekov
71 kg	(Iran) Hassan Esmaeilnejad	(Russia) Akhmed Musaev	(Kazakhstan) Yerkhan Bexultanov
71 kg	(Iran) Hassan Esmaeilnejad	(Russia) Akhmed Musaev	(India) Jaideep Narwal
80 kg	(India) Sagar Jaglan	(United States) James Rowley	(Georgia (country)) Tornike Samkharadze
80 kg	(India) Sagar Jaglan	(United States) James Rowley	(Russia) Mustafagadzhi Malachdibirov
92 kg	(Turkey) Rıfat Gıdak	(Russia) Zhorik Dzhioev	(Kazakhstan) Kamil Kurugliyev
92 kg	(Turkey) Rıfat Gıdak	(Russia) Zhorik Dzhioev	(Azerbaijan) Yusif Dursunov
110 kg	(Iran) Amir Reza Masoumi	(United States) James Mullen III	(Russia) Ilia Zhibalov
110 kg	(Iran) Amir Reza Masoumi	(United States) James Mullen III	(India) Sahil Sahil

=== Men's Greco-Roman ===
Event	Gold	Silver	Bronze
45 kg	(Ukraine) Nikita Dementiev	(Uzbekistan) Ozodbek Khalimboev	(Kyrgyzstan) Nurbolot Berdikulov
45 kg	(Ukraine) Nikita Dementiev	(Uzbekistan) Ozodbek Khalimboev	(Georgia (country)) Anri Khozrevanidze
48 kg	(Georgia (country)) Luka Javakhadze	(Turkey) Servet Angi	(Kazakhstan) Yussuf Ashrapov
48 kg	(Georgia (country)) Luka Javakhadze	(Turkey) Servet Angi	(Azerbaijan) Faraim Mustafayev
51 kg	(Kyrgyzstan) Nuristan Suerkulov	(Ukraine) Yuriy Tovt	(Azerbaijan) Rahman Karimov
51 kg	(Kyrgyzstan) Nuristan Suerkulov	(Ukraine) Yuriy Tovt	(Russia) Malik Gigiev
55 kg	(Russia) Valerii Mangutov	(United States) Cory Land	(Georgia (country)) Tamazi Glonti
55 kg	(Russia) Valerii Mangutov	(United States) Cory Land	(Turkey) Berati İnaç
60 kg	(Kyrgyzstan) Razzak Beishekeev	(Iran) Mostafa Rezaei	(Georgia (country)) Rati Khozrevanidze
60 kg	(Kyrgyzstan) Razzak Beishekeev	(Iran) Mostafa Rezaei	(India) Sumit Sumit
65 kg	(Ukraine) Imed Khudzhadze	(Georgia (country)) Anri Putkaradze	(India) Ankit Gulia
65 kg	(Ukraine) Imed Khudzhadze	(Georgia (country)) Anri Putkaradze	(Turkey) Nihat Kara
71 kg	(Moldova) Alexander Solovey	(Iran) Alireza Abdevali	(Azerbaijan) Ruslan Nurullayev
71 kg	(Moldova) Alexander Solovey	(Iran) Alireza Abdevali	(Bulgaria) Dimitar Rachev
80 kg	(Georgia (country)) Achiko Bolkvadze	(Russia) Kamaludin Magomedov	(Ukraine) Ivan Tsybanev
80 kg	(Georgia (country)) Achiko Bolkvadze	(Russia) Kamaludin Magomedov	(Azerbaijan) Joju Samedov
92 kg	(Belarus) Abubakar Khaslakhanau	(Ukraine) Vladyslav Lub	(Russia) Timur Chernyshev
92 kg	(Belarus) Abubakar Khaslakhanau	(Ukraine) Vladyslav Lub	(Iran) Ali Jalali
110 kg	(Russia) Daniil Chasovnikov	(Germany) Nikita Ovsjanikov	(Greece) Rafail Gkirnis
110 kg	(Russia) Daniil Chasovnikov	(Germany) Nikita Ovsjanikov	(Czech Republic) Artur Sarkisjan

=== Women's freestyle ===
Event	Gold	Silver	Bronze
40 kg	(United States) Erica Pastoriza	(Romania) Alexandra Voiculescu	(Ukraine) Anastasiia Polska
40 kg	(United States) Erica Pastoriza	(Romania) Alexandra Voiculescu	(Russia) Tana Tiuliush
43 kg	(India) Tannu Tannu	(Belarus) Valeryia Mikitsich	(United States) Angelina Marie Dill
43 kg	(India) Tannu Tannu	(Belarus) Valeryia Mikitsich	(Hungary) Liliana Kapuvari
46 kg	(India) Komal Komal	(Azerbaijan) Ruzanna Mammadova	(Turkey) Şevval Çayır
46 kg	(India) Komal Komal	(Azerbaijan) Ruzanna Mammadova	(United States) Ava Renee Ward
49 kg	(Ukraine) Mariia Yefremova	(Switzerland) Svenja Jungo	(Turkey) Sevim Akbaş
49 kg	(Ukraine) Mariia Yefremova	(Switzerland) Svenja Jungo	(United States) Audrey Rae Jimenez
53 kg	(United States) Katie Brianna Gomez	(Russia) Natalia Khramenkova	(India) Antim Panghal
53 kg	(United States) Katie Brianna Gomez	(Russia) Natalia Khramenkova	(Ukraine) Alina Filipovych
57 kg	(Turkey) Selvi İlyasoğlu	(Sweden) Tindra Olivia Dalmyr	(Russia) Angelina Pervukhina
57 kg	(Turkey) Selvi İlyasoğlu	(Sweden) Tindra Olivia Dalmyr	(Belarus) Uladzislava Kudzin
61 kg	(Russia) Victoria Khusainova	(Bulgaria) Sofi Stefanova Teneva	(Uzbekistan) Ulmeken Esenbaeva
61 kg	(Russia) Victoria Khusainova	(Bulgaria) Sofi Stefanova Teneva	(Belarus) Kseniya Tsiarenia
65 kg	(Hungary) Enikő Elekes	(Russia) Ekaterina Oleinikova	(India) Varsha Varsha
65 kg	(Hungary) Enikő Elekes	(Russia) Ekaterina Oleinikova	(Uzbekistan) Khurshida Kasimova
69 kg	(United States) Amit Elor	(Ukraine) Yevheniia Siedykh	(Belarus) Viktoryia Radzkova
69 kg	(United States) Amit Elor	(Ukraine) Yevheniia Siedykh	(Hungary) Noémi Nagy
73 kg	(India) Priya Malik	(Belarus) Kseniya Patapovich	(United States) Lillian Alene Freitas
73 kg	(India) Priya Malik	(Belarus) Kseniya Patapovich	(Russia) Mariia Akulincheva
