= 2026 U20 Pan American Wrestling Championships =

- Host city: Rio de Janeiro, Brazil
- Dates: 9–11 July 2026

Champions
- Freestyle: United States
- Greco-Roman: Mexico
- Women: United States

The 2026 U20 Pan American Wrestling Championships was held from 9 to 11 July in Rio de Janeiro, Brazil.

== Medal summary ==
=== Men's freestyle ===
| Event | Gold | Silver | Bronze |
|---|---|---|---|
| 57 kg | Grey Burnett; United States | Nathaniel Lyttle; Puerto Rico | Javier Tonita Charriez; Canada |
| 57 kg | Grey Burnett; United States | Nathaniel Lyttle; Puerto Rico | Oziel Herrera Mallqui; Peru |
| 61 kg | Dean Anderson; United States | Jaden Perez; Puerto Rico | Isaiah Jackson; Jamaica |
| 61 kg | Dean Anderson; United States | Jaden Perez; Puerto Rico | Moses Mendoza Garza; Mexico |
| 65 kg | Bo Bassett; United States | Fernando Arturo Perez Pena; Mexico | Kevinn Alexander Fernandez Angel; Colombia |
| 65 kg | Bo Bassett; United States | Fernando Arturo Perez Pena; Mexico | Yandel Enrique Morales; Puerto Rico |
| 70 kg | Vincent Bouzakis; United States | Ryan Dahcha; Canada | Joab Carrillo Rodriguez; Puerto Rico |
| 70 kg | Vincent Bouzakis; United States | Ryan Dahcha; Canada | Anthony Moreno; Ecuador |
| 74 kg | Haakon Peterson; United States | Ali Karout; Canada | Aiden Chur Martinez; Mexico |
| 74 kg | Haakon Peterson; United States | Ali Karout; Canada | Rafael Garcia Morales; Puerto Rico |
| 79 kg | Ryan Burton; United States | Loki Bigras; Canada | Nikolas Blake; Puerto Rico |
| 86 kg | Brock Mantanona; United States | Tejvir Dhinsa; Canada | Marcelo Miranda de Sousa; Brazil |
| 92 kg | Jimmy Mastny; United States | Alan Garcia Morales; Puerto Rico | Allan De Sousa Beserra; Brazil |
| 97 kg | Michael Boyle; United States | Harjot Shergill; Canada | Adrian Vasconcelos de Santana; Brazil |
| 125 kg | Coby Merrill; United States | Jagroop Dhinsa; Canada | Pedro Fernandes de Morais; Brazil |

=== Men's Greco-Roman ===
| Event | Gold | Silver | Bronze |
|---|---|---|---|
| 55 kg | Yuri Landim Ribeiro; Brazil | Caleb Noble; United States | Erick Choc Choc; Guatemala |
| 60 kg | Pedro De Souza Rodrigues; Brazil | Rodrigo Falcon Aguirre; Mexico | Luis Choc; Guatemala |
| 60 kg | Pedro De Souza Rodrigues; Brazil | Rodrigo Falcon Aguirre; Mexico | William Detar; United States |
| 63 kg | Clisman Carracedo Veliz; Ecuador | Daniel Guevara Pimentel; Mexico | Anthony Delgado; United States |
| 67 kg | Abisai Camacho Valenciano; Mexico | William Pozo Chuquillanqui; Peru | Caua Ferreira Dos Santos; Brazil |
| 67 kg | Abisai Camacho Valenciano; Mexico | William Pozo Chuquillanqui; Peru | Amryn Nutter; United States |
| 72 kg | Jorge Gomez Garcia; Mexico | Hunter Sturgill; United States | Jostyn Salvatierra Baque; Ecuador |
| 77 kg | Miguel Xavier Dos Santos; Brazil | Will Scherer; United States | Rafael Garcia Morales; Puerto Rico |
| 77 kg | Miguel Xavier Dos Santos; Brazil | Will Scherer; United States | Percyvall Jibaja Zazzali; Peru |
| 82 kg | Heder Saldana Bernardino; Mexico | Kaire Lima Gomes; Brazil | Logan Bruce; United States |
| 87 kg | Adonis Bonar II; United States | Cesar Veliz Perez; Mexico | Guilherme Landim Salles; Brazil |
| 97 kg | Dorian Trejo Olguin; Mexico | Brenton Russell Jr; United States | Jean Zambrano Longas; Ecuador |
| 130 kg | James Hartleroad; United States | Juan Calderon Molina; Ecuador | Carlos Cabrales Encarnacion; Mexico |

=== Women ===
| Event | Gold | Silver | Bronze |
|---|---|---|---|
| 50 kg | Sarissa Tucker; United States | Kayla Batres; Guatemala | Victoria Stefanov; Canada |
| 53 kg | Aubree Gutierrez; United States | Evily Bernardino Wong; Brazil | Mariana Duarte Gomez; Colombia |
| 53 kg | Aubree Gutierrez; United States | Evily Bernardino Wong; Brazil | Siria Gamboa Rodriguez; Guatemala |
| 55 kg | Marlee Solomon; United States | Ariana Saenz Abanto; Peru | Elizabeth Chapman; Canada |
| 55 kg | Marlee Solomon; United States | Ariana Saenz Abanto; Peru | Maria Dechico Satiro; Brazil |
| 57 kg | Molly Allen; United States | Ana Vergara Gil; Colombia | Myla Blackshaw; Canada |
| 59 kg | Jania Dunigan; Puerto Rico | Kai Pare; Canada | Cindell Casusol Casas; Peru |
| 59 kg | Jania Dunigan; Puerto Rico | Kai Pare; Canada | Kailey Benson; United States |
| 62 kg | Evilly Jesus Costa; Brazil | Carley Ceshker; United States | Leiddy Acuna Penaranda; Ecuador |
| 65 kg | Madison Marsh; United States | Beatriz Calasans Camargo; Brazil | Shantallee Barrios Bonalde; Colombia |
| 68 kg | Mayara Neper Oliveira Santos; Brazil | May Cuyler; United States | Mackenzie Cayer; Canada |
| 72 kg | Gretchen Donally; United States | Rayne Alves Da Silva; Brazil | Nicol Hurtado Castillo; Colombia |
| 76 kg | Jael Miller; United States | Sophia Perez Bassino; Brazil | Paola Rodriguez Guzman; Puerto Rico |

== Medal table ==
* Host nation (Brazil)

| Rank | Nation | Gold | Silver | Bronze | Total |
|---|---|---|---|---|---|
| 1 | United States | 19 | 6 | 5 | 30 |
| 2 | Brazil* | 5 | 5 | 7 | 17 |
| 3 | Mexico | 4 | 4 | 3 | 11 |
| 4 | Puerto Rico | 1 | 3 | 6 | 10 |
| 5 | Ecuador | 1 | 1 | 4 | 6 |
| 6 | Canada | 0 | 7 | 5 | 12 |
| 7 | Peru | 0 | 2 | 3 | 5 |
| 8 | Colombia | 0 | 1 | 4 | 5 |
| 9 | Guatemala | 0 | 1 | 3 | 4 |
| 10 | Jamaica | 0 | 0 | 1 | 1 |
| Totals (10 entries) | | 30 | 30 | 41 | 101 |

== Team ranking ==
| Rank | Men's freestyle | | Men's Greco-Roman | | Women's freestyle | |
| Rank | Team | Points | Team | Points | Team | Points |
|---|---|---|---|---|---|---|
| 1 | United States | 250 | Mexico | 193 | United States | 230 |
| 2 | Canada | 151 | United States | 190 | Brazil | 174 |
| 3 | Puerto Rico | 132 | Brazil | 169 | Canada | 121 |
| 4 | Mexico | 112 | Ecuador | 103 | Mexico | 95 |
| 5 | Brazil | 106 | Peru | 71 | Colombia | 85 |
| 6 | Colombia | 53 | Puerto Rico | 61 | Puerto Rico | 82 |
| 7 | Peru | 48 | Colombia | 59 | Guatemala | 63 |
| 8 | Guatemala | 38 | Guatemala | 52 | Peru | 47 |
| 9 | Ecuador | 27 | Chile | 31 | Ecuador | 23 |
| 10 | Jamaica | 21 | Panama | 18 | Panama | 18 |
| 11 | Chile | 16 | Jamaica | 12 | | |
| 12 | Panama | 14 | Honduras | 0 | | |
| 13 | El Salvador | 10 | | | | |
| 14 | Costa Rica | 4 | | | | |
| 15 | Bolivia | 0 | | | | |
