= Bishop McCort High School =

Location
- 25 Osborne Street; Johnstown, (Cambria County), Pennsylvania 15905; United States; 40°18′18″N 78°54′59″W

Information
- Type: Private, coeducational
- Religious affiliation: Catholic
- Established: 1922
- Principal: Thomas Smith
- Grades: 7–12
- Colors: Red and Gold
- Slogan: Pride, Loyalty, & Tradition
- Athletics: crusherathletics.org
- Athletics conference: Laurel Highlands Athletic Conference
- Mascot: Nort Nort
- Team name: Crimson Crushers
- Accreditation: Middle States Association of Colleges and Schools
- Tuition: $6,550 (19–20)
- Assistant Principal: Christopher Pfeil
- Athletic Director: Erika Strittmatter
- Website: highschool.mccort.org

Bishop McCort High School is a private, Catholic high school located in Johnstown, Pennsylvania in Cambria County. It is located in the Diocese of Altoona-Johnstown, though it is not run by the diocese due to its privatization in 2008.

== History ==
Johnstown Catholic High School opened on September 8, 1922, after Catholic parishioners of Johnstown raised $100,000 for their own school. An initial freshman class of 127 students enrolled with the plan of enrolling a new freshman class each year until all four classes had been filled. Only 50 students of the original 122 graduated in the Class of 1926. An auditorium and gym were added to the school in 1929. The 1930s and 1940s brought the Great Depression, a flood and World War II, each of which affected Catholic High as it did the rest of the nation. The Class of 1943 had its graduation postponed due to the war, and the Class of 1946 dedicated its yearbook to the 29 students killed in action throughout the course of the war.

By the 1950s, Johnstown Catholic's students and faculty had outgrown their building. In 1960, construction began to renovate and expand the school to include plans for the science, commercial, and music departments as well as a permanent chapel for the school community to celebrate the Eucharist. The original building had three structures added to it. On May 27, 1962, Johnstown Catholic High School was renamed to Bishop McCort High School, in honor of the late Bishop John Joseph McCort, whose vision had begun the work 40 years earlier.

In 1989, William Rushin became the first lay person to be named principal of BMHS.

On October 8, 2008, control of Bishop McCort High School was turned over to a board of trustees to be run as an independent non-profit 501-C3 corporation. The Board is responsible for operations at the high school, including policy development, hiring of a principal, marketing and budget.

The most recent addition to the school is the $3 million Bach Wellness Center. The 14,436-square-foot (1,341.1 m^{2}) building includes a weight room, a fitness area, and an auxiliary gymnasium for the school's basketball, baseball, softball, volleyball and tennis teams. The center is named for Dr. Thomas and Eileen Bach, who donated $1.2 million to the project.

== Notable alumni ==
- Bo Bassett - wrestler for the Virginia Tech Hokies
- Matt Bradley - Former professional American football player
- Tom Bradley - American football coach
- Frank Burns - Politician and current Pennsylvania State Representative
- Rita Clark - Former Pennsylvania State Representative
- Pete Duranko - Former professional American football player, Denver Broncos
- Jax Forrest - wrestler for the Oklahoma State Cowboys
- John Foust - Attorney and current Virginia politician
- Jack Ham - Hall of Fame professional American football player, Pittsburgh Steelers
- Andrew Hawkins - Former professional American football player and current sports radio host.
- Artrell Hawkins - Former professional American football player, Cincinnati Bengals and New England Patriots.
- Stephenie Scialabba - former Pennsylvania State Representative
- John Stofa - Former professional American football player, Miami Dolphins
- Ed Wojnaroski - Former Pennsylvania State Representative
