= 2024 U17 World Wrestling Championships =

- Host city: Amman, Jordan
- Dates: 19–25 August 2024
- Stadium: Princess Sumaya Bint al-Hasan Arena

Champions
- Freestyle: United States
- Greco-Roman: Iran
- Women: India

The 2024 U17 World Wrestling Championships (29th) took place from 19 to 25 August 2024 in Amman, Jordan. The United States topped the men's freestyle category, Iran topped the Greco-Roman category, while India topped the women's freestyle.

== Competition schedule ==
All times are (UTC+3)

Date	Time	Event
19 August	10:30	Qualification rounds GR – 48-55-65-80-110 kg
19 August	18:00	Semi-finals GR – 48-55-65-80-110 kg
20 August	10:30	Qualification rounds GR – 45-51-60-71-92 kg; Repechage GR – 48-55-65-80-110 kg
20 August	17:00	Semi-finals GR – 45-51-60-71-92 kg
20 August	18:00	Finals GR – 48-55-65-80-110 kg
21 August	10:30	Qualification rounds WW – 43-49-57-65-73 kg; Repechage GR – 45-51-60-71-92 kg
21 August	17:00	Semi-finals WW – 43-49-57-65-73 kg
21 August	18:00	Finals GR – 45-51-60-71-92 kg
22 August	10:30	Qualification rounds WW – 40-46-53-61-69 kg; Repechage WW – 43-49-57-65-73 kg
22 August	17:00	Semi-finals WW – 40-46-53-61-69 kg
22 August	18:00	Finals WW – 43-49-57-65-73 kg
23 August	10:30	Qualification rounds FS – 48-55-65-80-110 kg; Repechage WW – 40-46-53-61-69 kg
23 August	17:00	Semi-finals FS – 48-55-65-80-110 kg
23 August	18:00	Finals WW – 40-46-53-61-69 kg
24 August	10:30	Qualification rounds FS – 45-51-60-71-92 kg; Repechage FS – 48-55-65-80-110 kg
24 August	17:00	Semi-finals FS – 45-51-60-71-92 kg
24 August	18:00	Finals FS – 48-55-65-80-110 kg
25 August	16:30	Repechage FS – 45-51-60-71-92 kg
25 August	18:00	Finals FS – 45-51-60-71-92 kg

== Medal table ==
* Host nation (Jordan)

Rank	Nation	Gold	Silver	Bronze	Total
1	Iran	5	2	5	12
2	India	5	1	4	10
3	United States	5	0	5	10
–	Individual Neutral Athletes	4	5	9	18
4	Kyrgyzstan	3	1	2	6
5	Azerbaijan	2	1	7	10
6	Japan	1	4	4	9
7	Ukraine	1	3	2	6
8	Georgia	1	2	2	5
9	Uzbekistan	1	1	5	7
10	Canada	1	0	0	1
10	China	1	0	0	1
12	Kazakhstan	0	3	4	7
13	Germany	0	2	1	3
14	Puerto Rico	0	2	0	2
15	Armenia	0	1	3	4
16	Greece	0	1	0	1
16	Hungary	0	1	0	1
18	Turkey	0	0	3	3
19	Egypt	0	0	1	1
19	Estonia	0	0	1	1
19	Mexico	0	0	1	1
19	Romania	0	0	1	1
Totals (22 entries)		30	30	60	120

== Team ranking ==
Rank	Men's freestyle		Men's Greco-Roman		Women's freestyle	
Rank	Team	Points	Team	Points	Team	Points
1	United States	152	Iran	140	India	185
2	Iran	132	Uzbekistan	113	Japan	146
3	Kyrgyzstan	104	Azerbaijan	105	Kazakhstan	79
4	Georgia	77	Armenia	98	Ukraine	70
5	Azerbaijan	77	Kazakhstan	78	United States	66
6	Kazakhstan	65	Ukraine	74	Azerbaijan	55
7	Japan	57	Georgia	62	China	51
8	Puerto Rico	52	United States	56	Turkey	49
9	Turkey	50	Kyrgyzstan	55	Egypt	35
10	Armenia	49	India	46	Hungary	34

== Medal overview ==
=== Men's freestyle ===
Event	Gold	Silver	Bronze
45 kg	Sammy Sanchez; United States	Amirabbas Ramezani; Iran	Vugar Hasanzade; Azerbaijan
45 kg	Sammy Sanchez; United States	Amirabbas Ramezani; Iran	Dzhamal Bakaev; Authorised Neutral Athletes
48 kg	Ulugbek Rashidov; Uzbekistan	Amirabbas Alizadeh; Iran	Chingis Saryglar; Authorised Neutral Athletes
48 kg	Ulugbek Rashidov; Uzbekistan	Amirabbas Alizadeh; Iran	Henry Aslikyan; United States
51 kg	Domenic Munaretto; United States	Frederick Bachmann; Puerto Rico	Jinnosuke Okonogi; Japan
51 kg	Domenic Munaretto; United States	Frederick Bachmann; Puerto Rico	Marlen Abdraimov; Kyrgyzstan
55 kg	Kursantbek Isakov; Kyrgyzstan	Joseph Bachmann; Puerto Rico	Huseyn Huseynov; Azerbaijan
55 kg	Kursantbek Isakov; Kyrgyzstan	Joseph Bachmann; Puerto Rico	Keanu Dillard; United States
60 kg	Omurbek Asan Uulu; Kyrgyzstan	Huseyn Ismayilov; Azerbaijan	Hayk Avanesyan; Armenia
60 kg	Omurbek Asan Uulu; Kyrgyzstan	Huseyn Ismayilov; Azerbaijan	Itsuki Yonashiro; Japan
65 kg	Rustamzhan Kakharov; Kyrgyzstan	Ramazan Abdulkadyrov; Authorised Neutral Athletes	Umut Uslu; Turkey
65 kg	Rustamzhan Kakharov; Kyrgyzstan	Ramazan Abdulkadyrov; Authorised Neutral Athletes	Bakdaulet Akimzhan; Kazakhstan
71 kg	Abolfazl Shamsipour; Iran	Manuel Wagin; Germany	Fatih Aydın; Turkey
71 kg	Abolfazl Shamsipour; Iran	Manuel Wagin; Germany	Kairi Ito; Japan
80 kg	Reza Afshar; Iran	Nikoloz Maisuradze; Georgia	Darius Sas; Romania
80 kg	Reza Afshar; Iran	Nikoloz Maisuradze; Georgia	Artur Kostiuk; Ukraine
92 kg	Konstantine Petriashvili; Georgia	Rodion Sanakoev; Authorised Neutral Athletes	Amirreza Alipour; Iran
92 kg	Konstantine Petriashvili; Georgia	Rodion Sanakoev; Authorised Neutral Athletes	Elijah Diakomihalis; United States
110 kg	Michael Mocco; United States	Yedige Kassimbek; Kazakhstan	Mukhamad Gantemirov; Azerbaijan
110 kg	Michael Mocco; United States	Yedige Kassimbek; Kazakhstan	Abolfazl Mohammad Nezhad; Iran

=== Men's Greco-Roman ===
Event	Gold	Silver	Bronze
45 kg	Aslanbek Kostoev; Authorised Neutral Athletes	Marat Atshemyan; Armenia	Karamov Umidjon; Uzbekistan
45 kg	Aslanbek Kostoev; Authorised Neutral Athletes	Marat Atshemyan; Armenia	Beishembaev Bekzhan; Kyrgyzstan
48 kg	Armin Shamsi; Iran	Khusniddin Abdukarimov; Uzbekistan	Nikolai Kristov; Authorised Neutral Athletes
48 kg	Armin Shamsi; Iran	Khusniddin Abdukarimov; Uzbekistan	Amrah Amrahov; Azerbaijan
51 kg	Turan Dashdamirov; Azerbaijan	Kutman Kalbaev; Kyrgyzstan	Sainath Pardhi; India
51 kg	Turan Dashdamirov; Azerbaijan	Kutman Kalbaev; Kyrgyzstan	Abolfazl Karamiegaei; Iran
55 kg	Jayden Raney; United States	Alpamys Bolatuly; Kazakhstan	Sardor Kholmurzaev; Uzbekistan
55 kg	Jayden Raney; United States	Alpamys Bolatuly; Kazakhstan	Yurik Mkhitaryan; Armenia
60 kg	Aykhan Javadov; Azerbaijan	Vakhtang Lolua; Georgia	Jordyn Raney; United States
60 kg	Aykhan Javadov; Azerbaijan	Vakhtang Lolua; Georgia	Farrukh Yuldoshev; Uzbekistan
65 kg	Amir Mahdi Saeidi Nava; Iran	Vladyslav Pokotylo; Ukraine	Narek Grigorian; Armenia
65 kg	Amir Mahdi Saeidi Nava; Iran	Vladyslav Pokotylo; Ukraine	Dzhabrail Umkhadzhiev; Authorised Neutral Athletes
71 kg	Kiryl Valeuski; Authorised Neutral Athletes	Vladislav Byrlia; Authorised Neutral Athletes	Giorgi Aladashvili; Georgia
71 kg	Kiryl Valeuski; Authorised Neutral Athletes	Vladislav Byrlia; Authorised Neutral Athletes	Behruzbek Valiev; Uzbekistan
80 kg	Mikhail Shkarin; Authorised Neutral Athletes	Yerkebulan Anapiya; Kazakhstan	Vladyslav Solodchuk; Ukraine
80 kg	Mikhail Shkarin; Authorised Neutral Athletes	Yerkebulan Anapiya; Kazakhstan	Emad Reza Nejad; Iran
92 kg	Danial Izadi; Iran	Ole Ayke Sterning; Germany	Vladimer Minadze; Georgia
92 kg	Danial Izadi; Iran	Ole Ayke Sterning; Germany	Fakhrikamol Komiljonov; Uzbekistan
110 kg	Ivan Yankovskyi; Ukraine	Zoltán Czakó; Hungary	Ronak Dahiya; India
110 kg	Ivan Yankovskyi; Ukraine	Zoltán Czakó; Hungary	Aliasghar Dadbakhsh; Iran

=== Women's freestyle ===
Event	Gold	Silver	Bronze
40 kg	Aleksandra Fedorova; Authorised Neutral Athletes	Kamila Kuchma; Ukraine	Nazrin Ahmadli; Azerbaijan
40 kg	Aleksandra Fedorova; Authorised Neutral Athletes	Kamila Kuchma; Ukraine	Bala Raj; India
43 kg	Aditi Kumari; India	Maria Gkika; Greece	Gabriela Hernandez; Mexico
43 kg	Aditi Kumari; India	Maria Gkika; Greece	Aleksandra Berezovskaia; Authorised Neutral Athletes
46 kg	Yuu Katsume; Japan	Shrutika Patil; India	Morgan Turner; United States
46 kg	Yuu Katsume; Japan	Shrutika Patil; India	Medina Kuanyshbek; Kazakhstan
49 kg	Na Hu; China	Utaha Yui; Japan	Kseniya Kostsenich; Authorised Neutral Athletes
49 kg	Na Hu; China	Utaha Yui; Japan	Polina Bochkareva; Authorised Neutral Athletes
53 kg	Kaura Coles; Canada	Nana Kozuka; Japan	Muskan; India
53 kg	Kaura Coles; Canada	Nana Kozuka; Japan	Lisette Boettker; Estonia
57 kg	Neha Sangwan; India	So Tsutsui; Japan	Anna Stratan; Kazakhstan
57 kg	Neha Sangwan; India	So Tsutsui; Japan	Palina Brahinets; Authorised Neutral Athletes
61 kg	Taina Fernandez; United States	Sae Noguchi; Japan	Hiunai Hurbanova; Azerbaijan
61 kg	Taina Fernandez; United States	Sae Noguchi; Japan	Özdenur Özmez; Turkey
65 kg	Pulkit; India	Daria Frolova; Authorised Neutral Athletes	Uldana Tileukhan; Kazakhstan
65 kg	Pulkit; India	Daria Frolova; Authorised Neutral Athletes	Maram Mohamed Aly; Egypt
69 kg	Kajal; India	Oleksandra Rybak; Ukraine	Ako Uchiyama; Japan
69 kg	Kajal; India	Oleksandra Rybak; Ukraine	Zahra Karimzada; Azerbaijan
73 kg	Mansi Lather; India	Hanna Pirskaya; Authorised Neutral Athletes	Diana Titova; Authorised Neutral Athletes
73 kg	Mansi Lather; India	Hanna Pirskaya; Authorised Neutral Athletes	Lotta Englich; Germany

== Participating nations ==
570 wrestlers from 52 nations:

1. Individual Neutral Athletes (54)
2. Algeria (10)
3. Armenia (20)
4. Australia (1)
5. Azerbaijan (26)
6. Brazil (4)
7. Bulgaria (6)
8. Canada (8)
9. China (22)
10. Costa Rica (1)
11. Croatia (5)
12. Egypt (13)
13. Spain (1)
14. Estonia (2)
15. Finland (2)
16. United Kingdom (1)
17. Georgia (23)
18. Germany (11)
19. Greece (7)
20. Hungary (19)
21. India (29)
22. Iran (20)
23. Italy (2)
24. Jordan (17) (Host)
25. Japan (30)
26. Kazakhstan (30)
27. Kyrgyzstan (23)
28. South Korea (3)
29. Kosovo (2)
30. Latvia (1)
31. Lithuania (2)
32. Morocco (1)
33. Moldova (8)
34. Mexico (3)
35. Mongolia (13)
36. North Macedonia (2)
37. Netherlands (2)
38. Norway (1)
39. Peru (1)
40. Puerto Rico (5)
41. Romania (12)
42. South Africa (4)
43. Serbia (4)
44. Switzerland (2)
45. Slovakia (2)
46. Tajikistan (3)
47. Turkmenistan (2)
48. Chinese Taipei (2)
49. Tunisia (5)
50. Turkey (30)
51. Ukraine (30)
52. United States (26)
53. Uzbekistan (17)
