= Diego Aguilar =

Diego Aguilar may refer to:

- Diego de Aguilar (fl. 1597), Spanish painter
- Diego de Aguilar (bishop) (1616–1692), Spanish Roman Catholic prelate
- Diego Aguilar Acuña (born 1946), Mexican politician
- Diego Aguilar (footballer) (born 1997), Mexican footballer
