= Seitzhan Omarov =

Kazakh writer

Seitzhan Omarov (Kazakh: Seiıtjan Omarov, Сейітжан Омаров; 1907-1985) was a Kazakh writer. He is the author of numerous short stories, sketches, and fairy tales. His work was published in 20 collections of short stories. Omarov was an editor of "Zhazushy" publishing company. The high school number 3 in Atbasar, Kazakhstan, is named after Omarov. A museum of the writer can also be found there.
