= Sergio Vega =

Sergio Vega may refer to:

- Sergio Vega (bassist), American bassist and songwriter
- Sergio Vega (singer) (1969–2010), Mexican banda singer, "El Shaka"
