= Garima =

Garima may refer to:

== People ==
- Abba Garima, one of the Nine Saints of Ethiopia
- Garima Arora (born 1986), Indian chef
- Garima Chaudhary (born 1990), Indian judoka
- Garima Panta, Nepalese actress
- Garima Poddar (born 1997), Indian chef
- Garima Sanjay, Indian author
- Garima Singh, Indian politician
- Garima Vikrant Singh, Indian actress
- Garima, a Legends of Tomorrow character

== Other ==
- Abba Garima Monastery, Ethiopian monastery
- Garima Gospels, two ancient Ethiopic Gospel Books
