= Taniya =

Taniya is an Indian given name. Notable people with the name include:

- Taniya Bhatia (born 1997), Indian cricketer
- Taniya Soki, Indian politician

== See also ==
- Thaniya, also spelled Taniya, a side street and neighbourhood of Bangkok's Si Lom Road
