= Magomed Ibragimov =

Magomed Ibragimov may refer to:

- Magomed Ibragimov (wrestler, born 1974), Russian naturalized Macedonian wrestler of Avar descent
- Magomed Ibragimov (wrestler, born 1983), Dagestani Uzbek wrestler
- Magomed Ibragimov (wrestler, born 1985), Russian-born naturalized Uzbekistani freestyle wrestler
