= U17 World Wrestling Championships =

International wrestling event

- Status: Active
- Genre: U17 Wrestling Championships
- Date: August to September
- Frequency: Annual
- Location: Various
- Years active: 1975–present
- Inaugurated: 1975
- Most recent: 2026 Baku (Azerbaijan)
- Previous event: 2025 Athens (Greece)
- Next event: 2027 Amman (Jordan)
- Organiser: United World Wrestling
- 2026 U17 World Wrestling Championships

The U17 World Wrestling Championships is the Amateur Wrestling World Championship for athletes under 17 years old. It is organized by United World Wrestling.

== Editions ==
Year	Edition	Host	Dates	Winners			Ref
Year	Edition	Host	Dates	Men's freestyle	Men's Greco-Roman	Women's freestyle	Ref
1975	1st	Santo Domingo, Mexico	21–27 July	United States	—N/a	—N/a	
1976-1979: No Competitions
1980	2nd	Stockholm, Sweden	July 1980	Iraq	Sweden	—N/a	
1981: No Competition
1982	3rd	Colorado Springs, United States	2–8 August	Soviet Union	Soviet Union	—N/a	
1983	4th	Missoula, United States	1–8 August	United States	United States	—N/a	
1984-1986: No Competition
1987	5th	Tel Aviv, Tel Aviv (Israel)	August 1987	India	Turkey	—N/a	
1988	6th	Dijon, France	18–24 July	Soviet Union	Turkey	China	
1989	7th	Warrensburg, United States		United States	Turkey	—N/a	
1990	8th	Szombathely, Hungary		Soviet Union	Hungary	Norway	
1991	9th	Alma, Canada		Turkey	Hungary	—N/a	
1992	10th	Istanbul, Turkey		Turkey	Turkey	—N/a	
1993	11th	Duisburg and Luenen, Germany		Russia	Turkey	—N/a	
1994	12th	Frankfort, United States		Russia	Turkey	—N/a	
1995	13th	Budapest, Hungary		Russia	Russia	—N/a	
1996	14th	Tehran, Iran		Russia	Iran	—N/a	
1997	15th	New Delhi, India; Maribor, Slovenia		Russia	Russia	—N/a	
1998	16th	Manchester, United Kingdom; Pretoria, South Africa		Russia	Russia	Russia	
1999	17th	Łódź, Poland; Nykobing Falster, Denmark		Azerbaijan	Russia	Russia	
2000–2010: No Competitions for 11 Years
2011	18th	Szombathely, Hungary		Russia	Iran	Japan	
2012	19th	Baku, Azerbaijan		Russia	Azerbaijan	Japan	
2013	20th	Zrenjanin, Serbia		Russia	Azerbaijan	Japan	
2014	21st	Snina, Slovakia		Russia	Russia	Japan	
2015	22nd	Sarajevo, Bosnia and Herzegovina		Russia	Russia	Japan	
2016	23rd	Tbilisi, Georgia (Georgia (country))		Russia	Iran	Japan	
2017	24th	Athens, Greece		Russia	Russia	Japan	
2018	25th	Zagreb, Croatia		Iran	Iran	Japan	
2019	26th	Sofia, Bulgaria		Russia	Iran	Japan	
2020: No Competition
2021	27th	Budapest, Hungary	19–25 July	India	Georgia	United States	
2022	28th	Rome, Italy	25–31 July	United States	Iran	Japan	
2023	29th	Istanbul, Turkey	31 July–6 August	Iran	Iran	Japan	
2024	30th	Amman, Jordan	19–25 August	United States	Iran	India	
2025	31st	Athens, Greece	28 July–3 August	United States	Iran	India	
2026	32nd	Baku, Azerbaijan	27 July–2 August	Russia	Russia	United States	
2027	33rd	Amman, Jordan	2–8 August				

== Team rankings ==
Year	Men's freestyle			Men's Greco-Roman			Women's freestyle		
Year	1	2	3	1	2	3	1	2	3
2014	Russia	Iran	United States	Russia	Azerbaijan	Iran	Japan	Russia	Ukraine
2015	Russia	Iran	United States	Russia	Iran	Turkey	Japan	Russia	United States
2016	Russia	United States	Georgia	Iran	Turkey	Russia	Japan	Russia	United States
2017	Russia	United States	Azerbaijan	Russia	Iran	Ukraine	Japan	India	Russia
2018	Iran	United States	Azerbaijan	Iran	Russia	Turkey	Japan	India	China
2019	Russia	Iran	India	Iran	Azerbaijan	Russia	Japan	China	United States
2021	India	United States	Russia	Georgia	Ukraine	Russia	United States	India	Russia
2022	United States	India	Azerbaijan	Iran	Azerbaijan	Georgia	Japan	India	Ukraine
2023	Iran	United States	Japan	Iran	Azerbaijan	Georgia	Japan	United States	India
2024	United States	Iran	Kyrgyzstan	Iran	Uzbekistan	Azerbaijan	India	Japan	Kazakhstan
2025	United States	Iran	Kazakhstan	Iran	Uzbekistan	Kazakhstan	India	United States	Japan
2026	Russia	Iran	India	Russia	Azerbaijan	Iran	United States	India	Japan

== Team titles ==
Country	FS	GR	FW	Total
Russia	15	8	2	25
Iran	2	9	0	11
Japan	0	0	11	11
United States	6	1	2	9
Turkey	2	6	0	8
India	2	0	2	4
Soviet Union	3	1	0	4
Azerbaijan	1	2	0	3
Hungary	0	2	0	2
China	0	0	1	1
Georgia	0	1	0	1
Iraq	1	0	0	1
Norway	0	0	1	1
Sweden	0	1	0	1

== Medals (2021-2026) ==
Rank	Nation	Gold	Silver	Bronze	Total
1	United States	32	16	33	81
2	India	23	18	29	70
3	Iran	19	18	27	64
4	Japan	18	14	12	44
5	Azerbaijan	10	12	30	52
6	Uzbekistan	10	10	25	45
7	Individual Neutral Athletes	9	12	34	55
8	Russia	9	8	15	32
9	Ukraine	8	11	13	32
10	Georgia	7	8	15	30
11	Kazakhstan	6	9	24	39
12	Turkey	6	5	22	33
13	Kyrgyzstan	6	4	11	21
14	China	4	1	0	5
15	Armenia	3	3	18	24
16	Hungary	1	7	8	16
17	Belarus	1	2	4	7
18	Greece	1	2	2	5
18	Puerto Rico	1	2	2	5
20	Moldova	1	1	3	5
21	Croatia	1	0	1	2
22	Canada	1	0	0	1
22	Colombia	1	0	0	1
22	Mongolia	1	0	0	1
22	Poland	1	0	0	1
26	Germany	0	7	4	11
27	Romania	0	2	5	7
28	France	0	2	1	3
29	Bulgaria	0	1	3	4
30	Italy	0	1	2	3
30	Tajikistan	0	1	2	3
32	Sweden	0	1	0	1
32	Switzerland	0	1	0	1
32	Tunisia	0	1	0	1
35	Egypt	0	0	2	2
35	Estonia	0	0	2	2
35	Norway	0	0	2	2
38	Czech Republic	0	0	1	1
38	Great Britain	0	0	1	1
38	Lithuania	0	0	1	1
38	Mexico	0	0	1	1
38	Morocco	0	0	1	1
38	Netherlands	0	0	1	1
38	Panama	0	0	1	1
38	Serbia	0	0	1	1
38	Spain	0	0	1	1
Totals (46 entries)		180	180	360	720

== See also ==
- World Wrestling Championships
- U23 World Wrestling Championships
- U20 World Wrestling Championships
