= Magomed Omarov =

Magomed Omarov may refer to:

- Magomed Omarov (politician) (died 2005), Russian politician
- Magomed Omarov (boxer) (born 1989), Russian amateur boxer
