= List of Cadet, Junior, and Espoir World Champions in men's freestyle wrestling =

The age limitations for many of the Cadet and Junior World Championships are no longer easily ascertainable, and in many cases the ages listed below are unverified estimates. There were two Junior World Championships held in 1979 and 1980.

In the lists below, champions whose names are colored in gold, silver, or bronze, represent the highest placing medal they would win later on at the corresponding senior level World Championships or Olympic Games in freestyle wrestling. Champions colored in blue, are those who did not medal but would later represent their country at the senior level in the World Championships or Olympic Games in freestyle wrestling.

== List of 15 and Under World Champions in Men's Freestyle Wrestling ==
=== Cadet Worlds, 1975 (15 and under) ===
Year	23 kg	26 kg	29 kg	32 kg	35 kg	38 kg	42 kg	46 kg	50 kg	55 kg	60 kg	65 kg	65+ kg
1975	(Dominican Republic) Angel Cespedes	(Panama) Saul Leslie	(Peru) John Trujilano	(United States) Mark Sprague	(United States) Stanley Kline	(United States) Dane Tussel	(United States) Don St. James	(Mexico) Daniel Barrientos	(Argentina) Sergio Rojas	(Venezuela) Jose Ventura	(United States) John McNolty	(United States) Lance Anzivine	(Puerto Rico) Carlos Rossi

=== Cadet Worlds, 1980 (15 and under) ===
Year	28 kg	30 kg	32 kg	35 kg	38 kg	41 kg	45 kg	49 kg	53 kg	57 kg	62 kg	67 kg	67+ kg
1980	(India) Rajender Singh	(Mexico) Arturo Martinez	(United States) Bobby Malatesta	(India) Virender Singh	(United States) Cory Baze	(United States) Joe Melchiore	(India) Vinod Kumar	(Iraq) Muhtar Kassim	(Iraq) Raid Aiyal	(United States) Johnny Scott	(Iraq) Hatham Challoob	(Iraq) Mohammed Hussain Nadhum	(Iraq) Hussain Kadhum

=== Cadet Worlds, 1983 (15 and under) ===
Year	28 kg	30 kg	32 kg	35 kg	38 kg	41 kg	45 kg	49 kg	53 kg	57 kg	62 kg	67 kg	67+ kg
1983	(United States) Erin Millsap	(United States) Scott Bates	(United Kingdom) David Ogden	(United States) Travis West	(Italy) Giovanni Schillaci	(India) Sambhagi Pail	(India) Jaspal Singh	(India) Jai Prakash	(India) Mahabir Singh	(United States) Derek Fix	(Colombia) Luis Fernando Palomino	(United States) Todd Elrod	(United States) Kelly Lamb

== List of 16 and Under World Champions in Men's Freestyle Wrestling ==
=== Cadet Worlds, 1987–1996 (16 and under) ===
Year	40 kg	43 kg	47 kg	51 kg	55 kg	60 kg	65 kg	70 kg	76 kg	83 kg	95 kg
1987	(Turkey) Fazlı Yeter	(Turkey) Fatih Şengül	(India) Inderji Singh	(United Kingdom) Darren Wood	(United States) Mark Fergeson	(India) Ranbir Singh	(United States) Mike Klinglesmith	(Turkey) Mustafa Sarıoğlu	(Canada) Justin Abdou	(India) Randhir Singh	(United States) Erik Wisch
1988	No competition held	No competition held	No competition held	No competition held	No competition held	No competition held	No competition held	No competition held	No competition held	No competition held	No competition held
1989	(South Korea) Chan-Yul Jeon	(Turkey) İbrahim Üngör	(Turkey) Mükremin Kızılkaya	(South Korea) Sun-Hak Kim	(United States) Cary Kolat	(South Korea) Sang-Pil Son	(Hungary) Imre Baranyi	(Turkey) Osman Albayrak	(Hungary) Tamas Gal	(United States) Nick Hall	(United States) David Rogers
1990	(India) Satyawan	(Turkey) Harun Doğan	(Iran) Saeid Yaghmori	(Turkey) Ali Bekler	(Soviet Union) David Pogoschin	(Soviet Union) Igor Kupeev	(Cuba) Luis Tonge Laolao	(Czech Republic) Viliam Danis	(India) Shamsher Singh	(Soviet Union) Lucka Kochija	(Iran) Mohammed Reza Kaveh Tabar
1991	(Socialist Federal Republic of Yugoslavia) Sadik Ferati	(Turkey) Arif Kama	(Turkey) Harun Doğan	(Turkey) Hayri Yücel	(Soviet Union) Zaudin Boev	(Turkey) Adem Kaya	(Cuba) Daniel Gonzalez Aguilllera	(Soviet Union) Osman Dshurtubaev	(Turkey) Günay Köseoğlu	(Soviet Union) Murad Osmanev	(Turkey) Tolga İpek
1992	(Romania) Gheorghe Corduneanu	(India) Rajesh Kumar	(Turkey) Recep Zencirci	(Iran) Azizi Klarijini	(Russia) Rafael Kurbanov	(Ukraine) Alexander Melnik	(Turkey) Kadir Kurtoğlu	(Georgia (country)) Iosif Mekrishvili	(Turkey) Vedat Kartal	(Russia) Alexey Kaziev	(Iran) Alireza Rezaie
1993	(Russia) Adam Saitiev	(Russia) Murad Umakhanov	(India) Rakesh Kumar	(United States) Luis Blanco	(United States) Eric Guerrero	(Mongolia) Buyantogt Tsogtbaatar	(Russia) Roman Dzhusoev	(Kazakhstan) Dzhambulat Aliev	(Turkey) Recayi Göl	(Georgia (country)) Nikolos Begashvili	(Iran) Jamal Abolghasem
1994	(Russia) Zaur Botaev	(South Korea) Her Jung	(Russia) Umar Gugaev	(Turkey) Cemil Kaşkaya	(Russia) Magomedali Magomedaliev	(Russia) Umar Raurbiev	(Russia) Ramzan Murtazaliev	(Azerbaijan) Giticha Ibragimov	(Russia) Gennadiy Laliyev	(Hungary) Andras Balla	(Russia) Vitali Martushov
1995	(Azerbaijan) Gampios Ibragimov	(Russia) Murad Umarov	(Russia) Souchrab Khiziev	(Kyrgyzstan) Ernis Bazrkulov	(Ukraine) Ilya Stoyanov	(Russia) Soslan Tomaev	(Russia) Vadim Gigolayev	(Russia) Shamil Aliev	(Russia) Sazhid Sazhidov	(Russia) Gennadiy Laliyev	(Armenia) Magomedov Garaev
1996	(Azerbaijan) Reza Chalilov	(Azerbaijan) Abil Abrahimov	(Iran) Morteza Khoskbahkt	(Russia) Magomed Nabiev	(Kyrgyzstan) Symenkul Tabaldiev	(Iran) Mashallah Hosseini Sarangkeh	(Russia) Murad Gaidarov	(Russia) Magomed Magomedov	(Iraq) Ziad Raja	(Russia) Alan Makiev	(Georgia (country)) David Otiasvili

== List of 17 and Under World Champions in Men's Freestyle Wrestling ==
=== Cadet Worlds, 1997–1998 (17 and under) ===
Year	42 kg	45 kg	48 kg	52 kg	57 kg	63 kg	69 kg	76 kg	83 kg	95 kg
1997	(Poland) Krystian Brzozowski	(Russia) Ramiz Ramzanov	(Azerbaijan) Ibragim Abil	(Iran) Ramin Ghorbani	(Kyrgyzstan) Dmitri Michailov	(India) Ramesh Kumar	(Russia) Yusuf Gazanov	(Russia) Rustam Tschuchev	(India) Anil Kumar	(Russia) Guri Gugev
1998	(Azerbaijan) Namig Sevdimov	(India) Sushil Kumar	(Moldova) Tudor Verlan	(Azerbaijan) A. Ismailov	(Turkey) Erhan Bakır	(Russia) Akhmed Yussupov	(Russia) Khasbulatov	(Azerbaijan) Zia Aliyev	(Turkey) Serhat Balcı	(Russia) Chutawa

=== Cadet Worlds, 1999 (17 and under) ===
Year	42 kg	46 kg	50 kg	54 kg	58 kg	63 kg	69 kg	76 kg	85 kg	100 kg
1999	(India) Yogeshwar Dutt	(Azerbaijan) Namig Sevdimov	(India) Sushil Kumar	(United States) Justin Lester	(Turkey) Erhan Bakır	(Georgia (country)) Nikoloz Lobsanidze	(Azerbaijan) Kazbek Dagataev	(Russia) Sergey Vitkovski	(Kazakhstan) Nurzhan Katayev	(Iran) Yasser Nourzaee

=== Youth Olympic Games, 2010 (17 and Under) ===
Year	46 kg	54 kg	63 kg	76 kg	100 kg
2010	(Russia) Aldar Balzhinimayev	(Japan) Yuki Takahashi	(Russia) Azamatbi Pshnatlov	(Turkey) Rasul Kalaycı	(Azerbaijan) Ali Magomedibirov

=== Cadet Worlds, 2011–2013 (17 and under) ===
Year	42 kg	46 kg	50 kg	54 kg	58 kg	63 kg	69 kg	76 kg	85 kg	100 kg
2011	(Russia) Zaur Uguev	(Kazakhstan) Vladimir Kudrin	(Russia) Gadzhimurad Rashidov	(Azerbaijan) Sultan Nasrullaev	(India) Ashih Prahlad Singh	(Iran) Mehran Babaei	(Russia) Magomedgadzhi Imanshapiev	(Kazakhstan) Elkhan Assadov	(Iran) Hatem Aliakbarzadeh	(United States) Adam Coon
2012	(Azerbaijan) Cosgun Mammadov	(Russia) Zaur Uguev	(Iran) Ali Mohammadzadehnagharchi	(Russia) Gadzhimurad Rashidov	(Azerbaijan) Jahid Hasanzade	(United States) Zain Retherford	(Georgia (country)) Omari Gurjidze	(Russia) Abdulrashid Sadulaev	(Russia) Inal Tasoev	(Russia) Georgi Gogaev
2013	(Japan) Matsui Ryo	(Kazakhstan) Darkhan Kalkenov	(Russia) Abdulgav Shakhbanov	(Ukraine) Andriy Yatsenko	(Turkey) Selim Kozan	(United States) Aaron Pico	(Azerbaijan) Abdulmuslim Mukhuddinov	(Russia) Batyrbek Tsakulov	(Russia) Abdulrashid Sadulaev	(Russia) Zaur Kotchiev

=== Youth Olympic Games, 2014 (17 and Under) ===
Year	46 kg	54 kg	63 kg	76 kg	100 kg
2014	(Russia) Ismail Gadzhiev	(Kazakhstan) Mukhamed Kuatbek	(Azerbaijan) Teymur Mammadov	(Japan) Yamasaki Yajyuro	(Azerbaijan) Hajizada Igbal

=== Cadet Worlds, 2014–2017 (17 and Under) ===
Year	42 kg	46 kg	50 kg	54 kg	58 kg	63 kg	69 kg	76 kg	85 kg	100 kg
2014	(Iran) Alireza Goodarzi	(Iran) Erfan Aeini	(United States) Spencer Lee	(Ukraine) Andriy Yatsenko	(Russia) David Baev	(Azerbaijan) Parviz Ahmadov	(United States) Mason Manville	(United States) Mark Hall	(Azerbaijan) Shamil Abdullaev	(Georgia (country)) Givi Matcharachvili
2015	(Russia) Ivan Okonechnikov	(Russia) Aleksey Kopylov	(India) Anil Anil	(Japan) Takuto Otoguro	(United States) Yianni Diakomihalis	(United States) Jarod Verkleeren	(United States) Jacob Folsom	(Russia) Aslanbek Gvaramia	(Russia) Soslanbek Lavoev	(United States) Gable Steveson
2016	(United States) Kurt McHenry	(Russia) Zagir Shakhiev	(Russia) Petr Kopylov	(Ukraine) Andrey Dzhelep	(Iran) Amir Hossein Maghsoudi	(United States) Yianni Diakomihalis	(Azerbaijan) Abubakr Abakarov	(Georgia (country)) Miriani Maisuradze	(India) Deepak Punia	(United States) Gable Steveson
2017	(Azerbaijan) Alihasan Amirli	(United States) Kurt McHenry	(Russia) Fedor Baltuev	(Iran) Mehdi Esghivasoukola	(Japan) Ryuto Sakaki	(Russia) Inar Ketiia	(United States) Will Lewan	(United States) Aaron Brooks	(Russia) Alan Bagaev	(United States) Daniel Kerkvliet

=== Youth Olympic Games, 2018 (17 and Under) ===
Year	48 kg	55 kg	65 kg	80 kg	110 kg
2018	(Uzbekistan) Umidjon Jalolov	(United States) Robert Kelly Howard	(Azerbaijan) Turan Bayramov	(Russia) Akhmedkhan Tembotov	(Russia) Sergey Kozyrev

=== Cadet Worlds, 2018– (17 and Under) ===
Year	45 kg	48 kg	51 kg	55 kg	60 kg	65 kg	71 kg	80 kg	92 kg	110 kg
2018	(Iran) Rahman Amouzad	(Azerbaijan) Alihasan Amirli	(United States) Matthew James Ramos	(Uzbekistan) Jamshidbek Marufov	(Turkey) Hamza Alaca	(Azerbaijan) Turan Bayramov	(Georgia (country)) Bagrati Gagnidze	(Russia) Dmitrii Elkanov	(Iran) Ali Reza Abbasali Abdollahi	(Iran) Amir Hossein Zare
2019	(United States) Marc-Anthony McGowan	(Iran) Rahman Amouzad	(Russia) Mukhamed Takhir Khaniev	(Uzbekistan) Umidjon Jalolov	(Russia) Arip Abdulaev	(Azerbaijan) Dzhabrail Gadzhiev	(Russia) Soslan Albertovitch Tigiev	(Iran) Amir Hossein Firouzpour	(Iran) Soheyl Abdolghader Yousefi Sangani	(Russia) Arsamag Zasseev
2020	No competition held	No competition held	No competition held	No competition held	No competition held	No competition held	No competition held	No competition held	No competition held	No competition held
2021	(United States) Bowen William Bassett	(India) Aman Sehrawat	(Iran) Ali Mahmoud Khorramdel	(Russia) Magomed Baitukaev	(Uzbekistan) Kamronbek Kadamov	(United States) Meyer Shapiro	(Iran) Seyed Hassan Esmailnezhad	(India) Sagar Jaglan	(Turkey) Rıfat Gıdak	(Iran) Amir Reza Masoumi
2022	(United States) Domenic Munaretto	(Azerbaijan) Vasif Baghirov	(United States) Luke Lilledahl	(Kazakhstan) Daryn Askerbek	(Iran) Ebrahim Elahi	(Azerbaijan) Ilyas Isayev	(United States) Joseph Sealey	(India) Mor Sachin	(Kazakhstan) Kamil Kurugliev	(United States) Koy Hopke
2023	(Iran) Ahora Khateri	(United States) Paul Joseph Kenny	(Japan) Yamato Ogawa	(United States) Marcus Blaze	(Japan) Akito MAEHARA	(Iran) Sina Khalili	(United States) Ladarion Lockett	(Russia) Magomed Idrisov	(Georgia (country)) Sandro Kurashvili	(Azerbaijan) Yusif Dursunov
2024	(United States) Samuel Reyes Sanchez	(Uzbekistan) Ulugbek Rashidov	(United States) Domenic Munaretto	(Kyrgyzstan) Kursantbek Isakov	(Kyrgyzstan) Omurbek Asan Uulu	(Kyrgyzstan) Rustamzhan Kakharov	(Iran) Abdolfazl Shamsipour	(Iran) Reza Afshar	(Georgia (country)) Konstantin Petriashvili	(United States) Michael Mocco
2025	(United States) Keegan Bassett	(United States) Ariah Mills	(United States) Samuel Reyes Sanchez	(Japan) Jinnosuke Okonogi	(India) Sitender	(Azerbaijan) Huseyn Ismayilov	(United States) Jayden James	(Ukraine) Artur Kostiuk	David Dzebisov	Magomedrasul Omarov

== List of 18 and Under World Champions in Men's Freestyle Wrestling ==
=== Junior Worlds, 1969 (18 and Under) ===
Year	48 kg	52 kg	57 kg	62 kg	68 kg	74 kg	82 kg	90 kg	100 kg	100+ kg
1969	(Soviet Union) Ilarion Fedoseev	(United States) Bill Martin	(United States) Larry Morgan	(Japan) Saito Katsuhiko	(Japan) Kikuo Wada	(Soviet Union) Akako Chochashvili	(United States) Richard Binek	(United States) Bill Bragg	(United States) Mike Brundage	(Soviet Union) Soslan Andiev

=== Junior Worlds, 1971 (18 and Under) ===
Year	48 kg	52 kg	56 kg	60 kg	65 kg	70 kg	75 kg	81 kg	87 kg	100+ kg
1971	(Japan) Matsuhashi Yoshiyuki	(Turkey) Salim Bak	(Japan) Onishi Toshinobu	(Soviet Union) V. Sokolov	(Soviet Union) David Kvalelashvili	(Iran) S. Jabbar Mehdioun	(Iran) A. Esamaili	(Iran) A. Pramadian	(Soviet Union) Salman Khasimikov	(United States) Mark Bittick

=== Junior Worlds, 1978 (18 and Under) ===
Year	48 kg	52 kg	56 kg	60 kg	65 kg	70 kg	75 kg	81 kg	87 kg	87+ kg
1978	(United States) ? Kistler	(United States) ? Riley	(Iran) ? El Yasi	(Belgium) Sesers	(Iran) ? Ashkenaz	(Iran) Mahmoud Mamuran	(Greece) ? Iraklis	(United States) ? Tufto	(Iran) Amir Ghanji	(United States) ? Sherlock

=== Junior Worlds, 1980 (18 and Under) ===
Year	38 kg	40 kg	42 kg	45 kg	48 kg	51 kg	55 kg	59 kg	63 kg	68 kg	73 kg	78 kg	78+ kg
1980	(United States) Hans Houser	(Iran) Majid Torkan	(Iran) Esmail Agha Haddi	(Mexico) Marco Antonio Martinez	(Iran) R. Rowshan	(Iran) Jabbar Parsi	(Iran) Morteza Hosseinzadeh	(United States) Mark Sprague	(Iran) Mahmoud Kadhkodaee	(Iran) Nasser Ahmaddi	(Sweden) Anders Eriksson	(United States) Mike Davies	(United States) Dean Hall

=== Junior Worlds, 1980 (18 and Under) ===
Year	48 kg	52 kg	56 kg	60 kg	65 kg	70 kg	75 kg	81 kg	87 kg	87+ kg
1980	(Mexico) Bernardo Olvera Gonzalez	(Japan) Kina Kiyokuni	(United States) Kevin Darkus	(United States) Mark Timok	(United States) Duane Goldman	(United States) John Johnson	(Socialist Federal Republic of Yugoslavia) Bairan Coroli	(United States) Dan Chaid	(United States) Kahlan O'Hara	(United States) Randy Taylor

=== Cadet Worlds, 1982 (18 and under) ===
Year	48 kg	52 kg	56 kg	60 kg	65 kg	70 kg	75 kg	81 kg	87 kg	87+ kg
1982	(South Korea) Kyung-Sun No	(Soviet Union) Serik Alnimbaev	(Soviet Union) Evgeni Kuralenok	(United States) Joe Ghezzi	(United States) Tony Cook	(Soviet Union) Magomednebi Badatov	(Soviet Union) Kazbek Demurov	(Soviet Union) Makharbek Khadartsev	(Soviet Union) Leri Khabelov	(Soviet Union) Alexander Mutoshvili

=== Junior Worlds, 1983–1984 (18 and Under) ===
Year	48 kg	52 kg	56 kg	60 kg	65 kg	70 kg	75 kg	81 kg	87 kg	87+ kg
1983	(South Korea) Young-Jin	(Soviet Union) Evgeni Musoyan	(United States) Joe Melchiore	(Soviet Union) Nikolai Garkin	(Soviet Union) Magomed Magomedov	(Soviet Union) Aleksander Siniagin	(Soviet Union) Vakhtang Dolidze	(Soviet Union) Yuriy Ovcharenko	(Soviet Union) Makharbek Khadartsev	(Greece) Panagiotis Poikilidis
1984	(United States) Chris Bollin	(Japan) Kanahama Ryo	(United States) Ken Chertow	(United States) John Fisher	(United States) Len Bernstein	(South Korea) Chang Jae-Myung	(United States) Chris Geneser	(United States) John Ginther	(Germany) Stefan Krische	(United States) Jeff Ellis

=== Junior Worlds, 1986 (18 and Under) ===
Year	48 kg	52 kg	56 kg	60 kg	65 kg	70 kg	75 kg	81 kg	87 kg	130 kg
1986	(Bulgaria) Nikolai Kasabov	(North Korea) Kim Yong-Sik	(Romania) Danut-Dumitru Prefit	(North Korea) Kim Song-U	(Soviet Union) Eskender Tonsupov	(Soviet Union) Saguid Katinovasov	(Soviet Union) Sizajondin Kamidov	(Soviet Union) Ranezan Umarov	(Bulgaria) Wasil Todorov	(Soviet Union) Oleg Naniev

=== Junior Worlds, 1988–1995 (18 and Under) ===
Year	46 kg	50 kg	54 kg	58 kg	63 kg	68 kg	74 kg	81 kg	88 kg	115 kg
1988	(Cuba) Jose David Panuela	(South Korea) Kim Jong-Shin	(Soviet Union) Ramil Ataulin	(Soviet Union) Vadim Bogiyev	(North Korea) Kim Song-U	(East Germany) Andre Backhaus	(Bulgaria) Georgi Peyschev	(Soviet Union) Sergey Gubrinyuk	(Soviet Union) Oleg Ladik	(Soviet Union) Andrej Shumilin
1989	No competition held	No competition held	No competition held	No competition held	No competition held	No competition held	No competition held	No competition held	No competition held	No competition held
1990	(Soviet Union) Armen Mkrtchyan	(Iran) Gholam Reza Mohammadi	(Soviet Union) Anuchavan Sahakyan	(Iran) M. Hassan Duon	(Soviet Union) Zaza Zazirov	(Soviet Union) Shabdan Agrimbaev	(Soviet Union) Roman Grigorian	(Bulgaria) Kalojan Baev	(Soviet Union) Igors Samusonoks	(Turkey) Zekeriya Güçlü
1991	No competition held	No competition held	No competition held	No competition held	No competition held	No competition held	No competition held	No competition held	No competition held	No competition held
1992	(Cuba) Roberto Romero Monzon	(South Korea) Chon Chan Yul	(Bulgaria) Emil Tonev	(United States) Jeff McGinness	(South Korea) Jang Jae-Sung	(South Korea) Kim Jang-Soo	(Tajikistan) Stanislav Albegov	(Turkey) Osman Albayrak	(United States) Kerry McCoy	(Bulgaria) Miho Boev
1993	No competition held	No competition held	No competition held	No competition held	No competition held	No competition held	No competition held	No competition held	No competition held	No competition held
1994	(Cuba) Wilfredo Garcia Quintana	(Iran) Alireza Dabir	(Greece) Amiran Kardanov	(Moldova) Ruslan Bodișteanu	(Russia) Muhammed Nartokov	(Kyrgyzstan) Alseit Toroguldiev	(Russia) Ruslan Gadzhinov	(Turkey) Murat Gerotürk	(United States) Sean Hage	(Russia) Oleg Khorpiakov
1995	No competition held	No competition held	No competition held	No competition held	No competition held	No competition held	No competition held	No competition held	No competition held	No competition held

=== Junior Worlds, 1996 (18 and Under) ===
Year	49 kg	52 kg	56 kg	60 kg	65 kg	70 kg	76 kg	83 kg	90 kg	115 kg
1996	(Cuba) Diando Kintana	(Iran) Babak Nourzad	(Uzbekistan) Mais Ibadov	(Cuba) Yendris Pompa	(Russia) Soslan Tomaev	(Iran) Majid Khidan	(Kazakhstan) Ramzan Murtazaliev	(Turkey) Taşkın Özkale	(Russia) Kuramagomed Kuramagomedov	(Cuba) Alexis Rodríguez

== List of 20 and Under World Champions in Men's Freestyle Wrestling ==
=== Junior Worlds, 1973–1977 (20 and Under) ===
Year	48 kg	52 kg	57 kg	62 kg	68 kg	74 kg	82 kg	90 kg	100 kg	100+ kg
1973	(Bulgaria) Nermedin Selimov	(Japan) Funatsu Kaoru	(United States) Jimmy Carr	(Japan) Ganiko Kazunori	(Soviet Union) Musa ?	(Soviet Union) Magomed ?	(Bulgaria) ? Mustafov	(Soviet Union) ? Ortusuev	(Soviet Union) Salman Khasimikov	(Bulgaria) ? Strastev
1974	No competition held	No competition held	No competition held	No competition held	No competition held	No competition held	No competition held	No competition held	No competition held	No competition held
1975	(Soviet Union) Anatoly Beloglazov	(Japan) Murayama Suekichi	(Bulgaria) Micho Dukov	(Soviet Union) Alexander Michurov	(Bulgaria) ? Hamdiev	(Soviet Union) Anatoli Markovich	(Romania) Tiberiu Seregeli	(Bulgaria) ? Marinov	(Soviet Union) Aslanbek Bisultanov	(Hungary) Jozsef Balla
1976	No competition held	No competition held	No competition held	No competition held	No competition held	No competition held	No competition held	No competition held	No competition held	No competition held
1977	(Soviet Union) ? Kasabiev	(Soviet Union) Magomedgasan Abushev	(United States) Randy Lewis	(Soviet Union) Saipulla Absaidov	(Soviet Union) ? Kordev	(United States) Mark Churella	(Iran) Hassan ?	(Bulgaria) Ivan Petrov	(Soviet Union) Magomed Magomedov	(Bulgaria) Petar Ivanov

=== Junior Worlds, 1979 (20 and Under) ===
Year	48 kg	52 kg	57 kg	62 kg	68 kg	74 kg	82 kg	90 kg	100 kg	100+ kg
1979	(Soviet Union) Ali Nean Gulakhmedov	(Soviet Union) Iragi Shugaev	(Soviet Union) Andrey Jarzev	(Soviet Union) Magomedgasan Abushev	(Soviet Union) Boris Budaev	(Soviet Union) Youri Vorobiev	(Mongolia) Aduutsjin Baatarkhu	(Soviet Union) Sanasar Oganisyan	(Soviet Union) G. Kurashvili	(Bulgaria) M. Blagoev
1979	(United States) Dave Flores	(United States) Bruce Malinowski	(United States) Mark Timok	(United States) ? Moser	(United States) ? Grasinger	(United States) ? Coffing	(United States) ? Grisson	(United States) ? Kalski	(United States) ? Glasder	(United States) ? Vavrosky

=== Junior Worlds, 1981 (20 and Under) ===
Year	48 kg	52 kg	57 kg	62 kg	68 kg	74 kg	82 kg	90 kg	100 kg	100+ kg
1981	(Japan) Ishikawa Shinichi	(Soviet Union) ? Effendiev	(Soviet Union) Arsen Fadzayev	(Soviet Union) Stepan Sarkisyan	(Bulgaria) ? Arunov	(Soviet Union) Taymuraz Dzgoev	(Soviet Union) Youri Vorobiev	(Bulgaria) Angel Draganov	(Soviet Union) Aslan Khadartsev	(Soviet Union) Victor Zangiev

=== Junior Worlds, 1982 (20 and Under) ===
1982	(South Korea) Noh Kyung-Sun	(Soviet Union) Serik Alchimbaev	(Soviet Union) Evgeni Kuralenok	(United States) Joe Ghezzi	(United States) Tony Cook	(Soviet Union) Magomednebi Babator	(Soviet Union) Kazbek Demurov	(Soviet Union) Makharbek Khadartsev	(Soviet Union) Leri Khabelov	(Soviet Union) Aleksander Motuchvili

=== Espoir Worlds, 1983–1995 (20 and Under) ===
Year	48 kg	52 kg	57 kg	62 kg	68 kg	74 kg	82 kg	90 kg	100 kg	100+ kg (1983–1985), 130 kg (1987–1995)
1983	(Soviet Union) Igor Pervochuk	(Soviet Union) Aman Japparov	(Czech Republic) Jozef Schwendtner	(South Korea) Sa-Yong Chang	(Bulgaria) Yueksel Mustafov	(Soviet Union) Vladimir Dyugutov	(Romania) Dumitru Chiru	(Soviet Union) Robert Tibilov	(Soviet Union) Leri Khabelov	(Canada) John Tenta
1984	No competition held	No competition held	No competition held	No competition held	No competition held	No competition held	No competition held	No competition held	No competition held	No competition held
1985	(Bulgaria) Marian Nedkov	(Bulgaria) Ivan Tzonov	(Soviet Union) Evgeni Musoyan	(Soviet Union) Artur Fadzaev	(Soviet Union) Artur Mutabilov	(Bulgaria) Rahmat Sukra	(Soviet Union) Abusamad Gamisov	(Bulgaria) Stoyan Nentchev	(Soviet Union) Nikolai Ivanov	(Soviet Union) Nikolai Latushkin
1986	No competition held	No competition held	No competition held	No competition held	No competition held	No competition held	No competition held	No competition held	No competition held	No competition held
1987	(Soviet Union) Gnel Medshlumyan	(Japan) Hideo Sasayama	(Cuba) Lazaro Reinoso Martinez	(Soviet Union) Pashrutdin Salibekov	(Canada) Chris Wilson	(United States) Joe Pantaleo	(Soviet Union) Aleksander Savko	(Soviet Union) Magomed Gatagadshev	(Soviet Union) Arawat Sabejew	(Soviet Union) Alexi Medved
1988	No competition held	No competition held	No competition held	No competition held	No competition held	No competition held	No competition held	No competition held	No competition held	No competition held
1989	(Iran) Nasser Zeinal Nia	(Soviet Union) Bagavdin Umakhanov	(Mongolia) Suren Erdenebayar	(Iran) Taghi Akbar Nejad	(Soviet Union) Georgi Khinchegashvili	(Germany) Alexander Leipold	(Turkey) Sebahattin Öztürk	(Canada) Alf Wurr	(East Germany) Heiko Balz	(Soviet Union) Andrei Shumilin
1990	No competition held	No competition held	No competition held	No competition held	No competition held	No competition held	No competition held	No competition held	No competition held	No competition held
1991	(North Korea) Il Kim	(North Korea) Gwang-Chol Li	(Soviet Union) Gassa Gassanov	(United States) Alan Fried	(Soviet Union) Ramil Ataulin	No champion	(Iran) Rasul Khadem Azghadi	(Soviet Union) Vitali Gizoev	(Turkey) Ömer Aslantaş	(Soviet Union) Shorik Kashinov
1992	No competition held	No competition held	No competition held	No competition held	No competition held	No competition held	No competition held	No competition held	No competition held	No competition held
1993	(Armenia) Armen Mkrtchyan	(Turkey) Mevlana Kulaç	(Uzbekistan) Ramil Islamov	(Russia) Ismail Boziev	(Armenia) Araik Gevorgyan	(Uzbekistan) Taimuras Urusov	(Ukraine) Eldar Assanov	(Turkey) Ahmet Dağlı	(United States) Jeffrey Walter	(Belarus) Vyasheslav Pirsky
1994	No competition held	No competition held	No competition held	No competition held	No competition held	No competition held	No competition held	No competition held	No competition held	No competition held
1995	(Cuba) Wilfredo Garcia Quintana	(Iran) Behnam Tayebi-Kermani	(Belarus) Nikolai Savin	(Iran) Bahman Shahbazi	(Cuba) Yosmany Sanchez Larrudet	(Russia) Buvaisar Saitiev	(Iran) Alireza Heidari	(Iran) Abdul Reza Karegar	(Russia) Vadim Tasoyev	(Russia) Timur Piliev

=== Junior Worlds, 1997–1998 (20 and Under) ===
Year	49 kg	52 kg	56 kg	60 kg	65 kg	70 kg	76 kg	83 kg	90 kg	115 kg
1997	(Iran) Mohammad Rezaei	(Turkey) Ramazan Demir	(Iran) Alireza Dabir	(Moldova) Ruslan Bodișteanu	(Russia) Dimitri Kirilov	(Russia) Arsen Gitinov	(Iran) Majid Khodaei	(Iran) Fereydoun Ghanbari	(Turkey) Sermest Bulut	(Turkey) Aydın Polatçı
1998	(Iran) Alireza Darvishi	(Iran) Babak Nourzad	(United States) Stephen Abas	(Turkey) Mehmet Yozgat	(Russia) Zaur Botaev	(United States) Donny Pritzlaff	(Russia) Shamil Aliev	(Russia) Sazhid Sazhidov	(Russia) Georgi Gogshelidze	(Russia) Artyom Achigev

=== Junior Worlds, 1999–2001 (20 and Under) ===
Year	50 kg	54 kg	58 kg	63 kg	69 kg	76 kg	85 kg	97 kg	130 kg
1999	(United States) Timothy Hill	(Cuba) Rene Montero Rosales	(Iran) Mehdi Nikmanesh	(Moldova) Nicolai Paslar	(South Korea) Kwon-Sub Choi	(Iran) Bahram Abedi	(Russia) Vadim Laliev	(Russia) Georgi Gogshelidze	(Russia) Artyom Achigev
2000	(Uzbekistan) Dilshod Mansurov	(Russia) Alexander Kontoev	(Kazakhstan) Abil Ibragimov	(Kazakhstan) Iosef Momsedlidze	(Russia) Murat Umarov	(Iran) Majid Ramezani	(Russia) Sazhid Sazhidov	(Russia) Oleg Kallagov	(Ukraine) Ivan Ischenko
2001	(Georgia (country)) Amiran Elbakidze	(Uzbekistan) Dilshod Mansurov	(Kyrgyzstan) Ulan Nadyrbek Uulu	(Georgia (country)) Shalva Muziashvili Abajevi	(India) Ramesh Kumar	(Russia) Sergey Vitkovski	(Russia) Khadjimourat Gatsalov	(Iran) Mohammad Hossein Khaleghifar	(India) Palwinder Singh Cheema

=== Junior Worlds, 2002–2017 (20 and Under) ===
Year	50 kg	55 kg	60 kg	66 kg	74 kg	84 kg	96 kg	120 kg
2002	No competition held	No competition held	No competition held	No competition held	No competition held	No competition held	No competition held	No competition held
2003	(Iran) Farzan Bahrami	(Turkey) Ersin Çetin	(Russia) Makhach Murtazaliev	(Cuba) Geandry Garzon Caballero	(Russia) Sergey Vitkovski	(Russia) Georgi Tibilov	(Uzbekistan) Magomed Ibragimov	(Iran) Hadi Pouralijan
2004	No competition held	No competition held	No competition held	No competition held	No competition held	No competition held	No competition held	No competition held
2005	(Kyrgyzstan) Iliaz Ozumbekov	(Russia) Besik Kudukhov	(Russia) Vakiv Kaziev	(Russia) Shamil Batirov	(Bulgaria) Mihail Ganev	(Russia) Georgy Ketoyev	(Iran) Amir Abbas Moradi Ganji	(Russia) Beylal Makhov
2006	(Turkey) Ahmet Peker	(Russia) Djamal Otarsultanov	(Iran) Mehdi Taghavi	(Russia) Darsam Dzaparov	(Russia) Kakhaber Khubezhty	(Latvia) Imants Lagodskis	(Russia) Alan Lokhov	(Russia) Beylal Makhov
2007	(Mongolia) Dashpuntsag Tulga	(Russia) Djamal Otarsultanov	(Iran) Mehdi Taghavi	(United States) Bubba Jenkins	(Russia) Denis Tsargush	(Uzbekistan) Abdul Ammaev	(Ukraine) Valerii Andriitsev	(Russia) Bakhtiyar Akhmedov
2008	(Turkey) Ahmet Peker	(Russia) Nariman Israpilov	(Iran) Masoud Esmaeilpour	(Russia) Magomedmurad Gadzhiev	(Russia) Magomed Zubairov	(Russia) Abdusalam Gadisov	(Russia) Alen Zasyeyev	(Russia) Soslan Gaglojev
2009	(Turkey) Ahmet Peker	(Iran) Hassan Rahimi	(Russia) Timur Tsabolov	(Azerbaijan) Jabrail Hasanov	(Iran) Saeid Tavakkol	(Russia) Selim Yasar	(Iran) Erfan Amiri	(United States) Dom Bradley
2010	(Russia) Zikrula Dadaev	(Georgia (country)) Vladimer Khinchegashvili	(Russia) Gadzhi Abdulaev	(Russia) Alan Gogaev	(Georgia (country)) Davit Khutsishvili	(Russia) Andrey Valiev	(Russia) Shamil Akhmedov	(Ukraine) Muradin Kushkhov
2011	(Russia) Magomed Magomedaliev	(Georgia (country)) Vladimer Khinchegashvili	(Azerbaijan) Toghrul Asgarov	(Russia) Khetag Tsabolov	(Russia) Tamerlan Akhmedov	(Georgia (country)) Dato Marsagishvili	(Iran) Hamed Talebi	(Iran) Jaber Sadeghzadeh
2012	(Russia) Magomed Magomedaliev	(Mongolia) Erdenebatyn Bekhbayar	(Iran) Behnam Ehsanpour	(Russia) Magomed Kurbanaliev	(Russia) Zaur Makiev	(Iran) Mohammad Javad Ebrahimi	(Iran) Mehran Mirzaei	(Russia) Magomedgadzhi Nurasulov
2013	(Turkey) Süleyman Atlı	(Iran) Younes Sarmasti	(Azerbaijan) Akhmednabi Gvartzatilov	(Turkey) Selahattin Kılıçsallayan	(Russia) Alan Zaseev	(Russia) Vladislav Valiev	(United States) Kyle Snyder	(Georgia (country)) Geno Petriashvili
2014	(Russia) Khasan Hussein Badrudinov	(Russia) Azamat Tuskaev	(Iran) Iman Sadeghi	(Iran) Hassan Yazdani	(France) Zelimkhan Khadjiev	(Iran) Alireza Karimi	(Russia) Georgi Gogaev	(Canada) Amar Dhesi
2015	(United States) Spencer Lee	(Azerbaijan) Mahir Amiraslanov	(Iran) Iman Sadeghi	(Azerbaijan) Teymur Mammadov	(Russia) Gadzhi Nabiev	(Iran) Mojtaba Goleij	(Azerbaijan) Nurmagomed Gadzhiev	(Azerbaijan) Said Gamidov
2016	(United States) Spencer Lee	(Azerbaijan) Afgan Khashalov	(Iran) Peiman Biabani	(Turkey) Enes Uslu	(United States) Mark Hall	(Russia) Arsenali Musalaliev	(Iran) Hossein Shahbazigazvar	(Russia) Kazbek Khubulov
2017	(Azerbaijan) Shahin Mukhtarov	(United States) Daton Fix	(Russia) Abdula Akhmedov	(Russia) David Baev	(United States) Mark Hall	(Russia) Artur Naifonov	(Russia) Shamil Ali Musaev	(United States) Gable Steveson

=== Junior Worlds, 2018– (20 and Under) ===
Year	57 kg	61 kg	65 kg	70 kg	74 kg	79 kg	86 kg	92 kg	97 kg	125 kg
2018	(Russia) Akhmed Idrisov	(Russia) Abasgadzhi Magomedov	(Russia) Saiyn Kazyryk	(Azerbaijan) Khadzhimurad Gadzhiyev	(United States) Mekhi Lewis	(Japan) Hayato Ishiguro	(Turkey) Arif Özen	(Iran) Abbas Ali Foroutan	(Russia) Magomedkhan Magomedov	(Russia) Soslan Khinchagov
2019	(Japan) Toshiya Abe	(Japan) Kaiki Yamaguchi	(Iran) Amir Hossein Maghsoudi	(Ukraine) Erik Arushanian	(United States) David Carr	(Russia) Amkhad Tashukhadhziev	(India) Deepak Punia	(Russia) Alan Bagaev	(Iran) Abbas Ali Foroutan	(United States) Mason Parris
2020	No competition held	No competition held	No competition held	No competition held	No competition held	No competition held	No competition held	No competition held	No competition held	No competition held
2021	(Russia) Ramazan Bagavudinov	(Iran) Rahman Amouzad	(Russia) Shamil Mamedov	(Iran) Erfan Elahi	(United States) Keegan Daniel Otoole	(Iran) Mohammad Nokhodi	(Iran) Amir Hossein Firouzpour	(United States) Rocky Joseph Elam	(United States) Braxton James Amos	(Iran) Ali Mohammadebrahim Akbarpour
2022	(United States) Jore Volk	(Japan) Yuto Nishiuchi	(Uzbekistan) Umidjon Jalolov	(Azerbaijan) Kanan Heybatov	(Azerbaijan) Dzhabrail Gadzhiev	(Iran) Sobhan Yari	(France) Rakhim Magamadov	(Iran) Amir Hossein Firouzpour	(United States) Ben Kueter	(Iran) Amir Reza Masoumi
2023	(Japan) Yuto Nishiuchi	(India) Kumar Mohit	(Iran) Reza Shakeri	(United States) Meyer Shapiro	(United States) Mitchell Mesenbrink	(Russia) Ibragim Kadiev	(France) Rakhim Magamadov	(Iran) Mohammadmobin Azimi	(Iran) Abolfazl Babaloo	(Iran) Amir Reza Masoumi
2024	(United States) Luke Lilledahl	(Japan) Masanosuke Ono	(Iran) Ali Khorramdel	(Japan) Ryoya Yamashita	(Iran) Ali Rezaei	(Turkmenistan) Alp Arslan Begenjow	(Russia) Ibragim Kadiev	(Russia) Mustafagadzhi Malachdibirov	(Kazakhstan) Rizabek Aitmukhan	(Iran) Amir Reza Masoumi
2025	Magomed Ozdamirov	(United States) Marcus Blaze	(United States) Luke Stanich	(United States) PJ Duke	Ismail Khaniev	(Iran) Mehdi Yousefi	(United States) Max McEnelly	(Uzbekistan) Sherzod Poyonov	(United States) Justin Rademacher	(Kazakhstan) Yedige Kassimbek
2026	(Russia) Magomed Magomedov	(United States) Aaron Seidel	(United States) Bo Bassett	(Iran) Sina Khalili	(Japan) Ariya Yoshida	(Russia) Ismail Khaniev	(United States) Aeoden Sinclair	(Georgia (country)) Sandro Kurashvili	(United States) Michael Boyle	(Iran) Abolfazl Mohammad Nezhad

== List of 23 and Under World Champions in Men's Freestyle Wrestling ==
=== U-23 Worlds, 2017 (23 and Under) ===
Year	57 kg	61 kg	65 kg	70 kg	74 kg	86 kg	97 kg	125 kg
2017	(Cuba) Reineri Andreu	(Japan) Rinya Nakamura	(Russia) Nachyn Kuular	(United States) Richard Anthony Lewis	(Russia) Gadzhi Nabiev	(Russia) Alikhan Zhabrailov	(Iran) Mojtaba Goleij	(Georgia (country)) Geno Petriashvili

=== U-23 Worlds, 2018– (23 and Under) ===
Year	57 kg	61 kg	65 kg	70 kg	74 kg	79 kg	86 kg	92 kg	97 kg	125 kg
2018	(Japan) Toshihiro Hasegawa	(Russia) Magomedrasul Idrisov	(Japan) Rei Higuchi	(Slovakia) Tajmuraz Salkazanov	(Georgia (country)) Avtandil Kentchadze	(Georgia (country)) Nika Kentchadze	(Iran) Kamran Ghasempour	(Azerbaijan) Shamil Zubairov	(Georgia (country)) Givi Matcharashvili	(Russia) Said Gamidov
2019	(Cuba) Reineri Andreu	(Kyrgyzstan) Ulukbek Zholdoshbekov	(Azerbaijan) Turan Bayramov	(Georgia (country)) Mirza Skhulukhia	(Russia) Razambek Zhamalov	(Georgia (country)) Tariel Gaphrindashvili	(Iran) Kamran Ghasempour	(United States) Bo Nickal	(Iran) Mojtaba Goleij	(Iran) Amir Hossein Zare
2020	No competition held	No competition held	No competition held	No competition held	No competition held	No competition held	No competition held	No competition held	No competition held	No competition held
2021	(Azerbaijan) Aliabbas Rzazade	(Armenia) Arsen Harutyunyan	(Greece) Georgios Pilidis	(Kyrgyzstan) Ernazar Akmataliev	(Russia) Chermen Valiev	(Russia) Magomed Magomaev	(Ukraine) Mukhammed Aliiev	(Azerbaijan) Osman Nurmagomedov	(Iran) Amir Ali Azarpira	(United States) Anthony Cassioppi
2022	(India) Aman Sehrawat	(Armenia) Arsen Harutyunyan	(Armenia) Vazgen Tevanyan	(Georgia (country)) Giorgi Elbakidze	(Iran) Mohammad Sadegh Firouzpour	(Georgia (country)) Vladimeri Gamkrelidze	(Japan) Tatsuya Shirai	(Iran) Amir Hossein Firouzpour	(Iran) Amir Ali Azarpira	(Iran) Amir Reza Masoumi
2023	(Authorised Neutral Athletes) Nachyn Mongush	(Authorised Neutral Athletes) Bashir Magomedov	(Authorised Neutral Athletes) Ibragim Ibragimov	(Authorised Neutral Athletes) Inalbek Sheriev	(United States) Keegan O'Toole	(Authorised Neutral Athletes) Magomed Magomaev	(United States) Aaron Brooks	(Turkey) Muhammed Gimri	(United States) Isaac Trumble	(United States) Wyatt Hendrickson
2024	(India) Chirag Chikkara	(Authorised Neutral Athletes) Bashir Magomedov	(Authorised Neutral Athletes) Ibragim Ibragimov	(Azerbaijan) Magomed Khaniev	(Japan) Kota Takahashi	(Iran) Mehdi Yousefi	(Authorised Neutral Athletes) Arslan Bagaev	(Iran) Amir Hossein Firouzpour	(Kazakhstan) Rizabek Aitmukhan	(Iran) Amir Reza Masoumi
2025	(United States) Luke Lilledahl	(United States) Jax Forrest	(India) Sujeet Kalkal	(Azerbaijan) Kanan Heybatov	(United States) Mitchell Mesenbrink	(United States) Levi Haines	Arsen Balaian	(Iran) Mohammad Mobin Azimi	(Japan) Arash Yoshida	(Iran) Abolfazl Mohammadnejad
2026	(Kazakhstan) Merey Bazarbayevl	(United States) Benjamin Davino	(Iran) Ahora Khateri	(Russia) Magomed-Emi Eltemirov	(Russia) Magomed Baitukaev	(Iran) Mahdi Yousefi	(Russia) Arsen Balaian	(Iran) Abolfazl Rahmani	(Russia) Mukhamed-Takhir Khaniev	(Iran) Abolfazl Mohammadnejad

== See also ==
- World Junior Wrestling Championships
- List of Cadet, Junior and U-23 World Champions in men's Greco-Roman wrestling
- List of World and Olympic Champions in men's freestyle wrestling
- United States results in men's freestyle wrestling
- Soviet and Russian results in men's freestyle wrestling
- Iranian results in men's freestyle wrestling
