= List of Cadet, Junior, Espoir and U-23 World Champions in men's Greco-Roman wrestling =

The age limitations for many of the Cadet and Junior World Championships are no longer easily ascertainable, and in many cases the ages listed below are unverified estimates. There were two Junior World Championships held in 1979 and 1980.

In the lists below, champions whose names are colored in gold, silver, or bronze, represent the highest placing medal they would win later on at the corresponding senior level World Championships or Olympic Games in Greco-Roman wrestling. Champions colored in blue, are those who did not medal but would later represent their country at the senior level in the World Championships or Olympic Games in Greco-Roman wrestling.

== List of 15 and Under World Champions in Men's Greco-Roman Wrestling ==
=== Cadet Worlds, 1980 (15 and under) ===
Year	28 kg	30 kg	32 kg	35 kg	38 kg	41 kg	45 kg	49 kg	53 kg	57 kg	62 kg	67 kg	67+ kg
1980	(Colombia) Alberto García	(Mexico) Arturo Martinez	(Finland) Pasi Tuomilehto	(Norway) Danny Mankowitz	(Finland) Jukka Loikas	(Sweden) Lars Lagerborg	(India) Vinod Kumar	(Sweden) Joakim Franzen	(Mexico) Artemio Hernandez-Vasquez	(Sweden) Peter Jansson	(Sweden) Torbjoern Juliusson	(United States) Paul Kasprzyk	(Sweden) Jonas Toresaeter

=== Cadet Worlds, 1983 (15 and under) ===
Year	28 kg	30 kg	32 kg	35 kg	38 kg	41 kg	45 kg	49 kg	53 kg	57 kg	62 kg	67 kg	67+ kg
1983	(United States) Scott Davis	(Colombia) Javier E. Rincon	(United States) Brian Benbenek	(United States) Tony Kitchen	(United States) Haig Brown	(Peru) Luis Koo	(United States) Todd Layton	(Italy) Massimiliano Urbinati	(United States) Jay Simon	(United States) Brian Benjamin	(Italy) Marco Cimatti	(United States) Gavin Green	(United States) Eric Smith

== List of 16 and Under World Champions in Men's Greco-Roman Wrestling ==
=== Cadet Worlds, 1987-1996 (16 and under) ===
Year	40 kg	43 kg	47 kg	51 kg	55 kg	60 kg	65 kg	70 kg	76 kg	83 kg	95 kg
1987	(United States) Dusty Mauldin	(Egypt) Youor Mohamed	(Turkey) Hasan Çakıroğlu	(Turkey) Muharrem Güvercin	(Turkey) Necdet Kıroğlu	(Turkey) Rafet Ünver	(Italy) Tomas Anesi	(Israel) Igal Kroyter	(United States) Steve King	(United States) Adam Mariano	(Canada) Geoffrey Cohen
1988	No competition held	No competition held	No competition held	No competition held	No competition held	No competition held	No competition held	No competition held	No competition held	No competition held	No competition held
1989	(South Korea) Kim Eung-Joo	(Turkey) Şuayip Ünsal	(United States) Chris MacAurele	(Germany) Sinan Ahmet Hanlı	(Turkey) Yavuz Yılmaz	(South Korea) Son Sang-pil	(Turkey) Muttalip Yerlikaya	(Norway) Stian Pedersen	(Turkey) Elvan Mert	(Hungary) Nándor Gelénesi	(United States) Kevin Brinkworth
1990	(Turkey) Şeref Eroğlu	(Hungary) István Majoros	(Hungary) Matyas Megyes	(India) Yadav Pappu	(Romania) Gheorghe Bica	(Cuba) Liubal Colás	(East Germany) Soeren Hoemcue	(Turkey) Kazım Aktaş	(Hungary) János Tóth	(Turkey) Ali Midiliç	(Germany) Mirko Klein
1991	(Czechoslovak Socialist Republic) Michal Koza	(Hungary) Gabor Sudi	(Poland) Piotr Jabłoński	(Czechoslovak Socialist Republic) Szulcsanyi	(Norway) Terje Fornebo	(Turkey) Adem Sarı	(Hungary) Tamás Berzicza	(Hungary) Árpád Ritter	(United States) Jeremy Becker	(Hungary) Zsolt Simita	(United States) Jason Gleasman
1992	(Romania) Cristion Rubeigon	(Turkey) Bayram Özdemir	(Turkey) Ünal Örel	(Russia) Vladimir Bolshakov	(Turkey) Ümmet Kaya	(Turkey) Nazmi Avluca	(Georgia (country)) Tarieli Melelashvili	(Georgia (country)) Besarion Zurabiani	(Turkey) Hamza Yerlikaya	(Germany) Andreas Dudek	(Georgia (country)) Mirian Giorgadze
1993	(Russia) Sergey Kuntarev	(Cuba) Pedro-Pablo Gonzalez	(Turkey) Özgür Uygun	(Turkey) Ünal Örel	(Hungary) Peter Ronai	(Armenia) Karen Mnatsakanyan	(Turkey) Serkan Özden	(Armenia) Levon Geghamyan	(Georgia (country)) Besarion Zurabiani	(Kazakhstan) Vladimir Tkachenko	(Cuba) Michael Caso
1994	(Turkey) Yusuf Yeşilyurt	(Turkey) Erkan Dündar	(Azerbaijan) Tahir Zahidov	(Turkey) Bünyamin Emik	(Turkey) Hüseyin Akburu	(Turkey) Yusuf Düzer	(Turkmenistan) Shorat Khodayev	(Hungary) Tamas Feher	(Ukraine) Olexi Dozogau	(Kazakhstan) Valeriy Matviyenko	(Russia) Sergej Iljunin
1995	(Iran) Hamid Reza Nasiri	(Russia) Alexander Pitchougine	(Azerbaijan) Tahir Zahidov	(Iran) Hossein Sarbazi	(Russia) Roman Gromov	(Germany) Max Schwindt	(Turkey) Yusuf Düzer	(Hungary) Péter Szabó	(Romania) Marian Bradea	(Armenia) Yury Patrikeyev	(Belarus) Andrei Chekhauskoi
1996	(Russia) Nikita Pankratov	(Iran) Hasson Heidarianari	(Russia) Muhamed Balakov	(Kyrgyzstan) Uran Kalilov	(Iran) Morteza Gharagozlou	(Iran) Parviz Zeidvand	(Russia) Alexander Parfilkin	(Iran) Mehdi Alijani Miandehi	(Belarus) Shota Narmanya	(Turkey) Hüseyin Uzuner	(Ukraine) Michael Shvidkiy

== List of 17 and Under World Champions in Men's Greco-Roman Wrestling ==
=== Cadet Worlds, 1997-1998 (17 and under) ===
Year	42 kg	45 kg	48 kg	52 kg	57 kg	63 kg	69 kg	76 kg	83 kg	95 kg
1997	(Russia) Boris Jurkin	(Russia) Ezendei Ulankin	(Kazakhstan) Aydin Sarsekeev	(Azerbaijan) Arif Mechtiev	(Belarus) Alexander Rutschko	(Iran) Majid Ramazani	(Romania) Ionut Alboaie	(Russia) Levan Ketsevadse	(Georgia (country)) Gotcha Minadze	(United States) Joshua Etu
1998	(Poland) Julian Kwit	(Russia) Ezende Ovlankin	(Russia) Boris Jurkin	(Russia) Alexej Frolowski	(Russia) Alexej Ivanov	(Georgia (country)) Ivan Chubinidze	(Turkey) Selçuk Çebi	(Georgia (country)) George Rurua	(Hungary) Balázs Kiss	(Georgia (country)) Ilia Lejava

=== Cadet Worlds, 1999 (17 and under) ===
Year	42 kg	46 kg	50 kg	54 kg	58 kg	63 kg	69 kg	76 kg	85 kg	100 kg
1999	(Russia) Rustam Sindikov	(Kazakhstan) Dauren Bayakhmetov	(Azerbaijan) Emin Bashirov	(Georgia (country)) Paata Bitsadze	(Ukraine) Maksym Podolcky	(Georgia (country)) Elizbar Machutadze	(Turkey) Selçuk Çebi	(Russia) Nikolai Kurakov	(Turkey) Adem Taşçı	(Russia) Alexander Tchernischenko

=== Youth Olympic Games, 2010 (17 and Under) ===
Year	42 kg	50 kg	58 kg	69 kg	85 kg
2010	(Azerbaijan) Murad Bazarov	(Azerbaijan) Elman Mukhtarov	(Kyrgyzstan) Urmatbek Amatov	(Kazakhstan) Zhanlbek Kandybayev	(Russia) Ruslan Adzhigov

=== Cadet Worlds, 2011–2013 (17 and under) ===
Year	42 kg	46 kg	50 kg	54 kg	58 kg	63 kg	69 kg	76 kg	85 kg	100 kg
2011	(Georgia (country)) Ramaz Zoidze	(Iran) Reza Khedri	(Kazakhstan) Mirambek Ainagulov	(Iran) Ramin Taheri	(Azerbaijan) Elman Mukhtarov	(Iran) Payam Bouyeri	(Russia) Bislan Assakalov	(Germany) Denis Kudla	(Finland) Elias Kuosmanen	(Russia) Soslan Tuskaev
2012	(Ukraine) Artur Politaev	(Azerbaijan) Mikhail Rakhmanov	(Azerbaijan) Elnur Hasanov	(Azerbaijan) Karim Jafarov	(Azerbaijan) Murad Mammadov	(Azerbaijan) Ruhin Mikhailov	(Russia) Mansur Gubaev	(Azerbaijan) Islam Abbasov	(Turkey) Hasan Berk Kılınç	(Turkey) Emre Muyan
2013	(Ukraine) Emin Safershaev	(Iran) Mohammad Soltani Monfared	(Azerbaijan) Mikhail Rahmanov	(Japan) Kazuya Koyanagi	(Germany) Etienne Kinsinger	(Belarus) Azamat Takhoev	(Japan) Asen Sasaki	(Azerbaijan) Islam Abbasov	(Azerbaijan) Soslan Fanziev	(Georgia (country)) Zviadi Pataridze

=== Youth Olympic Games, 2014 (17 and Under) ===
Year	42 kg	50 kg	58 kg	69 kg	85 kg
2014	(North Korea) Ri Se-Ung	(Uzbekistan) Ilkhom Bakhromov	(Russia) Arslan Zubairov	(Azerbaijan) Islambek Dadov	(Russia) Mark Bemalian

=== Cadet Worlds, 2014–2017 (17 and Under) ===
Year	42 kg	46 kg	50 kg	54 kg	58 kg	63 kg	69 kg	76 kg	85 kg	100 kg
2014	(Russia) Atmir Kotchev	(Russia) Viktor Vedernikov	(Georgia (country)) Joni Khetsuriani	(Kazakhstan) Yernar Fidakhmetov	(Russia) Arslan Zubairov	(Finland) Matias Lipasti	(United States) Jacob Folsom	(Iran) Arman Alizadeh Abdevali	(Ukraine) Vladlen Kozlyuk	(Georgia (country)) Zviadi Pataridze
2015	(Iran) Pouya Dadmarz	(Uzbekistan) Turabek Tirkashev	(Italy) Giovanni Freni	(Ukraine) Oleksandr Hrushyn	(Iran) Amin Kavianinejad	(Georgia (country)) Aivengo Rikadze	(Russia) Aleksandr Komarov	(Ukraine) Dmitri Kiashok	(Russia) Artur Sargsian	(Iran) Amin Mirzazadeh
2016	(Iran) Omid Hossein Arami	(Uzbekistan) Elbek Ergashev	(Georgia (country)) Giorgi Shotadze	(Georgia (country)) Leri Abuladze	(Moldova) Valentin Petic	(Iran) Yousef Hajiali Hosseinvand	(Kyrgyzstan) Akzhol Makhmudov	(Russia) Aleksandr Komarov	(Hungary) Alex Szőke	(Poland) Gerard Kurniczak
2017	(Azerbaijan) Gurban Gurbanov	(Ukraine) Vladislav Kuzko	(Japan) Ken Matsui	(Russia) German Doev	(Iran) Mohsen Madhani	(Ukraine) Dmitri Miroshnik	(Ukraine) Vladislav Kravchenko	(Iran) Mehran Saadatifard	(Turkey) Muhammed Furkan Dursun	(United States) Cohlton Schultz

=== Youth Olympic Games, 2018 (17 and Under) ===
Year	45 kg	51 kg	61 kg	71 kg	92 kg
2018	(Iran) Amir Reza Dehbozorgi	(Japan) Wataru Sasaki	(Georgia (country)) Giorgi Tokhadze	(Moldova) Alexandrin Guţu	(Iran) Mohammad Nosrati

=== Cadet Worlds, 2018- (17 and Under) ===
Year	45 kg	48 kg	51 kg	55 kg	60 kg	65 kg	71 kg	80 kg	92 kg	110 kg
2018	(Russia) Ilias Yandarov	(Uzbekistan) Abror Atabaev	(Uzbekistan) Lazizkhon Uzbekov	(Iran) Amirhossein Khounsari	(Turkey) Serhat Kırık	(Russia) Muslim Imadaev	(Moldova) Alexandrin Guţu	(Armenia) Karen Khachataryan	(Iran) Mohammad Nosrati	(Turkey) Hamza Bakır
2019	(Kazakhstan) Samatbek Izimgali	(Iran) Amir Reza Dehbozorgi	(Iran) Saeid Esmaeili	(Azerbaijan) Nihat Zahid Mammadli	(Russia) Maksim Skuratov	(Belarus) Dzmitry Bonka	(Iran) Reza Rajab Ali Saki	(Ukraine) Mykyta Aleksieiev	(Azerbaijan) Lachin Valiev	(Iran) Shahrokh Abouzar Mikaeili
2020	No competition held	No competition held	No competition held	No competition held	No competition held	No competition held	No competition held	No competition held	No competition held	No competition held
2021	(Ukraine) Nikita Dementiev	(Georgia (country)) Luka Javakhadze	(Kyrgyzstan) Nuristan Suiorkulov	(Russia) Valeri Mangutov	(Kyrgyzstan) Razzak Beishekeev	(Ukraine) Imed Khudzhadze	(Moldova) Alexandru Solovei	(Georgia (country)) Achiko Bolkvadze	(Belarus) Abubakar Khaslakhanau	(Russia) Danil Chasovnikov
2022	(Ukraine) Yevhen Pokovba	(Iran) Ali Abdollah Ahmadi Vafa	(Uzbekistan) Aytjan Khalmakhanov	(India) Suraj Suraj	(Armenia) Gaspar Terteryan	(United States) Joel Richard Adams	(Georgia (country)) Anri Putkaradze	(Turkey) Alperen Berber	(Georgia (country)) Gor Ayvazyan	(Turkey) Cemal Yusuf Bakır
2023	(Azerbaijan) Turan Dashdamirov	(Iran) Payam Ahmadi	(Russia) Ilia Kandalin	(United States) Jordyn Raney	(Azerbaijan) Roman Karimov	(Russia) Zaur Beslekoev	(Greece) Arionas Kolitsopoulos	(Japan) Taizo Yoshida	(Georgia (country)) Saba Purtseladze	(Turkey) Cemal Yusuf Bakır
2024	(Russia) Aslanbek Kostoev	(Iran) Armin Shamsipour	(Azerbaijan) Turan Dashdamirov	(United States) Jayden Raney	(Azerbaijan) Aykhan Javadov	(Iran) Amir Mahdi Saeidi Nava	(Belarus) Kiril Valevski	(Russia) Mikahil Shkarin	(Iran) Danial Izadi	(Ukraine) Ivan Yankovskyi
2025	(Kazakhstan) Kuanyshbek Zhangazhol	(Uzbekistan) Bunyod Hasanov	(Uzbekistan) Otabek Tursunov	(Kyrgyzstan) Alkham Abdirasulov	(Azerbaijan) Ali Nazarov	(Armenia) Janes Nazaryan	(Uzbekistan) Behruzbek Valiev	(Uzbekistan) Abdulaziz Kholmirzaev	(Iran) Amirsam Mohammadi	(India) Hardeep

== List of 18 and Under World Champions in Men's Greco-Roman Wrestling ==
=== Junior Worlds, 1969 (18 and Under) ===
Year	48 kg	52 kg	57 kg	62 kg	68 kg	74 kg	82 kg	90 kg	100 kg	100+ kg
1969	(Bulgaria) Liben Chosupov	(Soviet Union) Aleksander Kustov	(Bulgaria) Krasimir Stefanov	(Soviet Union) Mansour Bairamov	(Bulgaria) Stefan Laudenov	(Soviet Union) Ruben Karapetyan	(Soviet Union) Aleksey Stativka	(Soviet Union) Petar Tichtchenko	(Soviet Union) Akaki Meladze	(Soviet Union) Shota Morshiladse

=== Junior Worlds, 1971 (18 and Under) ===
Year	48 kg	52 kg	56 kg	60 kg	65 kg	70 kg	75 kg	81 kg	87 kg	100+ kg
1971	(Soviet Union) Kilas Akhmedov	(Soviet Union) Oleg Davidyan	(Soviet Union) Viktor Bekhtemirov	(United States) Berney Gonzales	(Bulgaria) Konstantin Trajkov	(Soviet Union) Anatoly Bykov	(Soviet Union) Alexander Onistchenko	(Soviet Union) Tamas Kiknadse	(Soviet Union) Nikolai Lysenko	(Bulgaria) Stefan Ognafov

=== Junior Worlds, 1978 (18 and Under) ===
Year	48 kg	52 kg	56 kg	60 kg	65 kg	70 kg	75 kg	81 kg	87 kg	87+ kg
1978	(Germany) Freddy Scherer	(Germany) Klaus Holz	(Netherlands) Frans Jansen	(United States) Bigelback	(United States) Norcia	(United States) Mead	(United States) Delaney	(Germany) Franz Esser	(Germany) J. Richter	(Canada) Mascharin

=== Junior Worlds, 1980 (18 and Under) ===
Year	38 kg	40 kg	42 kg	45 kg	48 kg	51 kg	55 kg	59 kg	63 kg	68 kg	73 kg	78 kg	78+ kg
1980	(United States) Sean Smith	(Norway) Svein H. Skogland	(Norway) Lars Roenningen	(Finland) Arne Leppaenen	(Italy) Ignazio Digregorio	(Sweden) Mikael Andersson	(Sweden) Markku Kitterfeldt	(Venezuela) Abel Franco	(Finland) Seppo Salomaeki	(Sweden) Stefan Edvardsson	(Socialist Federal Republic of Yugoslavia) Goran Jaksic	(Socialist Federal Republic of Yugoslavia) Zoran Vucevic	(Sweden) Magnus Freij

=== Junior Worlds, 1980(18 and Under) ===
Year	48 kg	52 kg	56 kg	60 kg	65 kg	70 kg	75 kg	81 kg	87 kg	87+ kg
1980	(Mexico) Daniel Aceves	(Germany) Dieter Schwind	(Socialist Federal Republic of Yugoslavia) Damir Brozovic	(Venezuela) Elio Inojosa	(Germany) Raimund Feser	(Norway) Morten Hageboe	(Sweden) Stefan Holmquist	(Germany) R. Reiner	(Socialist Federal Republic of Yugoslavia) Csaba Majoros	(Germany) Heinz-Ullrich Marnette

=== Cadet Worlds, 1982 (18 and under) ===
Year	48 kg	52 kg	56 kg	60 kg	65 kg	70 kg	75 kg	81 kg	87 kg	87+ kg
1982	(Soviet Union) Segey Buranov	(Soviet Union) Vladimir Morsikhini	(Soviet Union) Valeri Perimov	(Soviet Union) Ilham Gamidov	(Italy) Umberto DiBiase	(Soviet Union) Alexander Kondratzki	(Soviet Union) Valerio Korodev	(Austria) Georg Marchl	(Soviet Union) Zauri Ivanashvili	(Soviet Union) Aleksander Baskatov

=== Junior Worlds, 1983-1984 (18 and Under) ===
Year	48 kg	52 kg	56 kg	60 kg	65 kg	70 kg	75 kg	81 kg	87 kg	87+ kg
1983	(South Korea) Huh Byung-ho	(Soviet Union) Eduard Avakian	(Soviet Union) Korun Martirosyan	(United States) David Olmsted	(Germany) Claudio Passarelli	(Italy) Umberto DiBiase	(Turkey) Hüseyin İldem	(Soviet Union) Igor Naumenko	(Soviet Union) Zauri Ivanashvili	(Greece) Panagiotis Poikilidis
1984	(China) Huang Wenghui	(South Korea) Huh Byung-ho	(China) Xuewen Deng	(Austria) Markus Pittner	(South Korea) Kim Seung-Young	(South Korea) Lee Sam-Sung	(Germany) Bernd Froehlich	(South Korea) Cho Byung-Hak	(Germany) Rolf Beck	(Italy) Fabio Valguarnera

=== Junior Worlds, 1986 (18 and Under) ===
Year	48 kg	52 kg	56 kg	60 kg	65 kg	70 kg	75 kg	81 kg	87 kg	130 kg
1986	(South Korea) An Han-bong	(Cuba) Pedro Roque	(Soviet Union) Iss Iliasov	(Soviet Union) Salavat Sakhautpinov	(Hungary) Attila Repka	(Cuba) Alfredo Vicet	(Romania) Anton Arghira	(Soviet Union) Anatoli Boltenkov	(Soviet Union) Roman Michitshenko	(Cuba) Héctor Milián

=== Junior Worlds, 1988–1995 (18 and Under) ===
Year	46 kg	50 kg	54 kg	58 kg	63 kg	68 kg	74 kg	81 kg	88 kg	115 kg
1988	(Soviet Union) Samvel Danielyan	(Soviet Union) Vardan Agadyanian	(Soviet Union) Boris Ambartsoumov	(Cuba) Juan Marén	Wasko Stanimirow	(Soviet Union) Arkadi Krajni	(South Korea) Park Myung-suk	(Soviet Union) Andrej Juriw	(Soviet Union) Wjatscheslaw Kosatschenko	(Soviet Union) Sergei Mureiko
1989	No competition held	No competition held	No competition held	No competition held	No competition held	No competition held	No competition held	No competition held	No competition held	No competition held
1990	(Soviet Union) Sarqis Elgan	(Soviet Union) Mkhitar Manukyan	(Romania) Marian Sandu	(Soviet Union) Yuriy Melnichenko	(Soviet Union) Andrei Lisitsa	(Bulgaria) Veselin Tchelengirov	(Soviet Union) Andrei Karavaev	(Hungary) Attila Nagy	(Soviet Union) Sergey Matushenko	(Soviet Union) Sergej Elagin
1991	(Soviet Union) Ibad Akhmedov	(Soviet Union) Witali Tscheban	(Soviet Union) Navruz Ushmanov	(Soviet Union) Mkhitar Manukyan	(Greece) Konstantinos Arkoudeas	(Cuba) Rodolfo Fuentes Rodriguez	(Sweden) Martin Lidberg	(Turkey) Elvan Mert	(Hungary) Nándor Gelénesi	(Italy) Giuseppe Giunta
1992	(South Korea) Yong Jung-Chung	(India) Pappu Yadav	(Turkey) Şeref Eroğlu	(Cuba) Augusto Apolonio Paz Morales	(Cuba) Luis Felipe Sarria Guirola	(Cuba) Liubal Colás	(Cuba) Cantero Jackson Vaillant	(Cuba) Humberto Torres Trujillo	(Russia) Aleksey Cheglakov	(Cuba) Fidel Emilio Castro Moldes
1993	No competition held	No competition held	No competition held	No competition held	No competition held	No competition held	No competition held	No competition held	No competition held	No competition held
1994	(Cuba) Roberto Monzón	(Turkey) Bayram Özdemir	(Romania) Leonhard Ionel Frincu	(South Korea) Choi Duk-hoon	(Azerbaijan) Vugar Aslanov	(Russia) Alexander Krutchinkin	(Finland) Tuomas Ojala	(Armenia) Levon Geghamyan	(Turkey) Hamza Yerlikaya	(Belarus) Dmitry Debelka
1995	No competition held	No competition held	No competition held	No competition held	No competition held	No competition held	No competition held	No competition held	No competition held	No competition held
1996	(Russia) Alexander Pitchougine	(Ukraine) Sergej Sobokar	(Cuba) Roberto Monzón	(Russia) Anton Ishitski	(Azerbaijan) Nazib Nizami Aliev	(Germany) Max Schwindt	(Turkey) Yusuf Düzer	(Ukraine) Oleksandr Daragan	(Ukraine) Davyd Saldadze	(Russia) Alexej Tarabarin

== List of 20 and Under World Champions in Men's Greco-Roman Wrestling ==
=== Junior Worlds, 1973–1977 (20 and Under) ===
Year	48 kg	52 kg	57 kg	62 kg	68 kg	74 kg	82 kg	90 kg	100 kg	100+ kg
1973	(Romania) Constantin Alexandru	(Romania) Nicu Ginga	(Romania) Ion Dulica	(Soviet Union) Nelson Davidyan	(Soviet Union) Anatoly Bykov	(Soviet Union) Lejawa	(Sweden) Frank Andersson	(Bulgaria) Vassil Petkov Koichov	(Soviet Union) Michail Saladze	(Bulgaria) Nikolov
1975	(Soviet Union) Kamil Fatkulin	(Soviet Union) Asionyan	(Soviet Union) Juri Kortschergin	(Bulgaria) Ivan Saikov	(Soviet Union) Suren Nalbandyan	(Soviet Union) Taimuraz Apkhasava	(Sweden) Frank Andersson	(Soviet Union) Loss	(Soviet Union) Valentinas Mizgaitis	(Soviet Union) Avtandil Maisuradze
1977	(Soviet Union) Benur Pashayan	(Bulgaria) Mladen Mladenov	(Soviet Union) Piwowapow	(Soviet Union) Anatoli Kravchenko	(Bulgaria) Lyubomir Tzekov	(Soviet Union) Tzekov Baranov	(Soviet Union) Boev	(Bulgaria) Ivan Petrov	(Poland) Roman Bierla	(Soviet Union) Beloglasov

=== Junior Worlds, 1979 (20 and Under) ===
Year	48 kg	52 kg	57 kg	62 kg	68 kg	74 kg	82 kg	90 kg	100 kg	100+ kg
1979	(Soviet Union) Temo Kazarashvili	(Soviet Union) Benur Pashayan	(Bulgaria) Marin Atanassov	(Soviet Union) Michail Prokudin	(Sweden) Soelve Halling	(Soviet Union) Vladimir Arsenyev	(Bulgaria) Jewgeni Stamov	(Soviet Union) Valeri Idanov	(Soviet Union) Valeri Zokolaev	(Bulgaria) Rangel Gerovski
1979	(United States) Mark Fuller	(Germany) Stefan Kurz	(Germany) H. Hein	(Germany) Raimund Feser	(Germany) Armin Rachor	(United States) Crews	(Germany) M. Seifert	(Germany) A. Reinhard	(Germany) Rainer Weber	(United States) Reinert

=== Junior Worlds, 1981 (20 and Under) ===
Year	48 kg	52 kg	57 kg	62 kg	68 kg	74 kg	82 kg	90 kg	100 kg	130 kg
1981	(United States) Mark Fuller	(Soviet Union) Izie Surtukov	(Hungary) Arpad Sipos	(Soviet Union) Anatolii Tainkin	(Hungary) Tibor Dudas	(Soviet Union) Borislav Velichkov	(Italy) Ernesto Razzino	(Hungary) Lajos Herczeg	(Soviet Union) Sanuk	(Soviet Union) Igor Rostorotsky

=== Junior Worlds, 1982 (20 and Under) ===
Year	48 kg	52 kg	56 kg	60 kg	65 kg	70 kg	75 kg	81 kg	87 kg	87+ kg
1982	(Soviet Union) Sergei Buranov	(Soviet Union) Vladimir Morssikhini	(Soviet Union) Valeri Perminov	(Soviet Union) Ilham Gamidov	(Italy) Umberto DiBiase	(Soviet Union) Alexander Kondratzki	(Soviet Union) Valeri Korodev	(Austria) Georg Marchl	(Soviet Union) Zauri Ivanashvili	(Soviet Union) Aleksander Baskakov
1983	(South Korea) Huh Byung-ho	(Soviet Union) Eduard Avakian	(Soviet Union) Korun Martirosyan	(United States) David Olmsted	(Germany) Claudio Passarelli	(Italy) Umberto DiBiase	(Turkey) Hüseyin İldem	(Soviet Union) Igor Naumenko	(Soviet Union) Zauri Ivanashvili	(Greece) Panagiotis Poikilidis

=== Espoir Worlds, 1984-1995 (20 and Under) ===
Year	48 kg	52 kg	57 kg	62 kg	68 kg	74 kg	82 kg	90 kg	100 kg	130 kg
1983	(Romania) Ilie Muti	(Soviet Union) Sergej Sabejvorota	(Soviet Union) Izie Surtukov	(Bulgaria) Rosen Vasilev	(Poland) Mariusz Przygoda	(Soviet Union) Mikhail Mamiashvili	(Bulgaria) Tzeko Popov	(Bulgaria) Todor Kanev	(Romania) Ioan Grigoraş	(Soviet Union) Michail Tkatschuk
1984	No competition held	No competition held	No competition held	No competition held	No competition held	No competition held	No competition held	No competition held	No competition held	No competition held
1985	(Soviet Union) Gevorg Merzorhanyan	(Bulgaria) Hristo Dimov	(Soviet Union) Arutik Rubenian	(Bulgaria) Hristo Angelov	(Bulgaria) Rumen Gentschev	(Soviet Union) Dyemal Bakuridze	(Soviet Union) Moudy Amaev	(Soviet Union) Zauri Ivanoshvili	(Bulgaria) Ivaylo Yordanov	(Soviet Union) Aleksandr Karelin
1986	No competition held	No competition held	No competition held	No competition held	No competition held	No competition held	No competition held	No competition held	No competition held	No competition held
1987	(Soviet Union) Oleg Kucherenko	(Bulgaria) Vassil Botev	(Soviet Union) Aghasi Manukyan	(Soviet Union) Zachrab Abbasov	(Soviet Union) Mnatsakan Iskandaryan	(Soviet Union) Nikolai Palashnik	(Soviet Union) Nail Alyamshaev	(Cuba) Reynaldo Peña	(Soviet Union) Tengiz Tedoradze	(Soviet Union) Aleksandr Karelin
1988	No competition held	No competition held	No competition held	No competition held	No competition held	No competition held	No competition held	No competition held	No competition held	No competition held
1989	(Poland) Krzysztof Czyzewski	(Soviet Union) Nazir Shamshutdinov	(Germany) Guenther Kissner	(Bulgaria) Savko Savov	(Cuba) Nestor Almanza	(France) Yvon Riemer	(Soviet Union) Oleg Balamutov	(Soviet Union) Naibi Dwalidze	(Soviet Union) Heiko Balz	(Soviet Union) Sergei Mureiko
1990	No competition held	No competition held	No competition held	No competition held	No competition held	No competition held	No competition held	No competition held	No competition held	No competition held
1991	(North Korea) Il Kim	(Soviet Union) Samvel Danielyan	(Soviet Union) Alexander Ivashkin	(Soviet Union) Yuriy Melnichenko	(Soviet Union) Stepan Sardarjan	(Soviet Union) Anatoli Moskvitin	(Soviet Union) Murat Kardanov	(Soviet Union) Sergey Matviyenko	(Soviet Union) Georgi Saladze	(Soviet Union) Yuri Evseitchik
1992	No competition held	No competition held	No competition held	No competition held	No competition held	No competition held	No competition held	No competition held	No competition held	No competition held
1993	(Moldova) Vitali Cheban	(Armenia) Armen Nazaryan	(Hungary) Matyas Megyes	(Russia) Juri Solomatin	(Bulgaria) Biser Georgiev	(Azerbaijan) Khvicha Bichinashvili	(Sweden) Martin Lidberg	(Russia) Aleksey Cheglakov	(Georgia (country)) Bakur Gogitidze	(United States) Jason Gleasman
1994	No competition held	No competition held	No competition held	No competition held	No competition held	No competition held	No competition held	No competition held	No competition held	No competition held
1995	(Iran) Mohsen Sourian	(Iran) Behnam Tayyebi	(Russia) Aleksei Ogorodnikov	(Turkey) Şeref Eroğlu	(Georgia (country)) Tarieli Melelashvili	(Hungary) Tamás Berzicza	(Belarus) Viachaslau Makaranka	(Ukraine) Alexander Krimets	(Turkey) Fahri Güzel	(Belarus) Dmitry Debelka

=== Junior Worlds, 1997–1998 (20 and Under) ===
Year	49 kg	52 kg	56 kg	60 kg	65 kg	70 kg	76 kg	83 kg	90 kg	115 kg
1997	(Turkey) Ünal Örel	(Iran) Behnam Tayyebi	(Ukraine) Parviz Kasimov	(Belarus) Sergej Zachardetzki	(Belarus) Alexander Shishko	(Russia) Alexander Krutchinkin	(Hungary) Sándor Bárdosi	(Turkey) Serkan Özden	(Russia) Vladimir Bachtov	(Russia) Alexej Tarabarin
1998	(Turkey) Ünal Örel	(Kyrgyzstan) Uran Kalilov	(Russia) Nikolai Antonkin	(Iran) Sardar Pashaei	(Russia) Maksim Semenov	(Ukraine) Sergios Solonikis	(Uzbekistan) Yuriy Vitt	(Turkey) Tekin Çağlar	(Israel) Henri Papiashvili	(Russia) Alexej Tarabarin

=== Junior Worlds, 1999–2001 (20 and Under) ===
Year	50 kg	54 kg	58 kg	63 kg	69 kg	76 kg	85 kg	97 kg	130 kg
1999	(Romania) Claudiu Florin Gavrila	(Russia) Aleksey Shevtsov	(Russia) Alexander Pitchougine	(Russia) Varteres Samurgashev	(Germany) Max Schwindt	(Russia) Aleksey Mishin	(Greece) Theofanis Anagnostou	(United States) Garrett Lowney	(Armenia) Yury Patrikeyev
2000	(Germany) Ceyhun Zaidov	(Kazakhstan) Asset Imanbayev	(Israel) Ivan Alexandrov	(Ukraine) Armen Vardanyan	(Ukraine) Volodymyr Shatskykh	(Hungary) Istvan Szabo	(Ukraine) Sergey Rutenko	(Russia) Khasan Baroyev	(Kazakhstan) Georgiy Tsurtsumia
2001	(Armenia) Roman Amoyan	(Kazakhstan) Asset Imanbayev	(Turkey) Şeref Tüfenk	(Azerbaijan) Farid Mansurov	(Russia) Andrei Demankin	(Iran) Majid Ramezani	(Iran) Masoud Hashemzadeh	(Georgia (country)) Ramazi Devadze	(Russia) Khasan Baroyev

=== Junior Worlds, 2002–2017 (20 and Under) ===
Year	50 kg	55 kg	60 kg	66 kg	74 kg	84 kg	96 kg	120 kg
2002	No competition held	No competition held	No competition held	No competition held	No competition held	No competition held	No competition held	No competition held
2003	(Azerbaijan) Rovshan Bayramov	(Iran) Hamid Bavafa	(Kazakhstan) Nurbakyt Tengizbayev	(Turkey) Şeref Tüfenk	(South Korea) Park Jin-sung	(Armenia) Denis Forov	(Georgia (country)) Ramaz Nozadze	(Turkey) Yavuz Güvendi
2004	No competition held	No competition held	No competition held	No competition held	No competition held	No competition held	No competition held	No competition held
2005	(Belarus) Elbek Tazhyieu	(Iran) Hamid Sourian	(Socialist Federal Republic of Yugoslavia) Davor Štefanek	(Turkey) Refik Ayvazoğlu	(Iran) Davoud Abedinzadeh	(Kyrgyzstan) Janarbek Kenjeev	(Russia) Sergey Sabinin	(Sweden) Jalmar Sjöberg
2006	(Russia) Damir Ahmedianov	(Russia) Zaur Kuramagomedov	(Russia) Islambek Albiev	(Turkey) Refik Ayvazoğlu	(Turkey) Mehmet Ümit Bedel	(Turkey) Cenk İldem	(Hungary) Iván Németh	(Turkey) İsmail Güzel
2007	(Iran) Reza Assadpour	(Bulgaria) Aleksandar Kostadinov	(Turkey) Rahman Bilici	(Russia) Ruslan Belkhoroev	(Armenia) Arsen Julfalakyan	(Iran) Amir Aliakbari	(Turkey) Ahmet Taçyıldız	(Russia) Soslan Farniev
2008	(Kyrgyzstan) Kanybek Zholchubekov	(Bulgaria) Aleksandar Kostadinov	(Turkey) Rahman Bilici	(Iran) Saeid Abdevali	(Azerbaijan) Elvin Mursaliyev	(Russia) Zaur Karezhev	(Turkey) Ahmet Taçyıldız	(Turkey) Rıza Kayaalp
2009	(Kazakhstan) Artur Umbetkaliev	(Azerbaijan) Orkhan Ahmadov	(Azerbaijan) Hasan Aliyev	(Iran) Saeid Abdevali	(Uzbekistan) Azizbek Murodov	(Iran) Babak Ghorbani	(Cuba) Yasmany Lugo	(Turkey) Rıza Kayaalp
2010	(Azerbaijan) Eldaniz Azizli	(Russia) Stepan Maryanyan	(Azerbaijan) Kamran Mammadov	(Russia) Chingiz Labazanov	(Russia) Roman Vlasov	(Armenia) Artur Aleksanyan	(Russia) Islam Magomedov	(Ukraine) Ihor Didyk
2011	(Azerbaijan) Vilayat Gahramanli	(Armenia) Narek Khachataryan	(Uzbekistan) Bobirbek Zaylobidinov	(Russia) Chingiz Labazanov	(Armenia) Rafik Manukyan	(Georgia (country)) Revaz Nadareishvili	(Russia) Islam Magomedov	(Georgia (country)) Shota Gogisvanidze
2012	(Azerbaijan) Murat Bazarov	(Azerbaijan) Eldaniz Azizli	(Russia) Zaur Kabaloev	(Azerbaijan) Jeyhun Aliyev	(Belarus) Kazbek Kilou	(Turkey) Barış Güngör	(Lithuania) Vilius Laurinaitis	(Hungary) Bálint Lám
2013	(Iran) Farshad Isvandmahmoudi	(Turkey) Şerif Kılıç	(Armenia) Karen Aslanyan	(Russia) Abuyazid Mantsigov	(Armenia) Karapet Chalyan	(Russia) Sosruko Kodzokov	(Russia) Musa Evloev	(Russia) Sergey Semenov
2014	(Azerbaijan) Ibrahim Nurullaev	(Azerbaijan) Murad Mammadov	(Azerbaijan) Elman Mukhtarov	(Georgia (country)) Shmagi Bolkvadze	(Turkey) Furkan Bayrak	(Azerbaijan) Islam Abbasov	(Azerbaijan) Orkhan Nuriyev	(Russia) Sergey Semenov
2015	(Iran) Reza Khedri	(Azerbaijan) Murad Mammadov	(Russia) Sergey Emelin	(Georgia (country)) Ramaz Zoidze	(Georgia (country)) Gela Bolkvadze	(Turkey) Ali Cengiz	(Italy) Nikoloz Kakhelashvili	(Georgia (country)) Zviadi Pataridze
2016	(Russia) Vladislav Melnikov	(Georgia (country)) Dato Chkhartishvili	(Kyrgyzstan) Kaly Sulaimanov	(Georgia (country)) Ramaz Zoidze	(Kazakhstan) Tamerlan Shadukayev	(Azerbaijan) Islam Abbasov	(Georgia (country)) Giorgi Melia	(Georgia (country)) Zviadi Pataridze
2017	(Iran) Pouya Dadmarz	(Turkey) Kerem Kamal	(Iran) Keramat Morad Abdevali	(Iran) Amin Kaviyaninejad	(United States) Kamal Bey	(Russia) Aleksandr Komarov	(Ukraine) Vladlen Kozlyuk	(Georgia (country)) Zviadi Pataridze

=== Junior Worlds, 2018– (20 and Under) ===
Year	55 kg	60 kg	63 kg	67 kg	72 kg	77 kg	82 kg	87 kg	97 kg	130 kg
2018	(Iran) Poaya Naserpour	(Turkey) Kerem Kamal	(Kyrgyzstan) Erbol Bakirov	(Armenia) Malkhas Amoyan	(Iran) Amin Kaviyaninejad	(Russia) Islam Opiev	(Russia) Aleksandr Komarov	(Iran) Mohammad Hadi Saravi	(Finland) Arvi Savolainen	(Iran) Amin Mirzazadeh
2019	(Russia) Anvar Allakhiarov	(Turkey) Kerem Kamal	(Russia) Abu Muslim Aptievitch Amaev	(Georgia (country)) Giorgi Shotadze	(Russia) Sergei Stepanov	(Iran) Mohammad Aziz Naghousi	(Hungary) István Takács	(Russia) Ilia Ermolenko	(Cuba) Gabriel Rosillo	(Iran) Ali Akbar Yousefi
2020	No competition held	No competition held	No competition held	No competition held	No competition held	No competition held	No competition held	No competition held	No competition held	No competition held
2021	(Iran) Amir Reza Dehbozorgi	(Russia) Dinislam Bammatov	(Russia) Said Bakaev	(Azerbaijan) Hasrat Jarafov	(Russia) Evgenii Baidusov	(Russia) Islam Aliev	(Netherlands) Marcel Sterkenburg	(Russia) Adlan Amriev	(Belarus) Pavel Hlinchuk	(Turkey) Hamza Bakır
2022	(Azerbaijan) Nihad Guluzade	(Iran) Saeid Esmaeili	(Iran) Iman Mohammadi	(Azerbaijan) Kanan Abdullazade	(Azerbaijan) Gurban Gurbanov	(Germany) Deni Nakaev	(Iran) Alireza Mohmadi	(Armenia) Vigen Nazaryan	(Iran) Ali Abedi	(Ukraine) Mykhailo Vyshnyvetskyi
2023	(Kazakhstan) Iskhar Kurbayev	(Armenia) Suren Aghajanyan	(Iran) Ahmad Reza Mohsennejad	(Egypt) Moustafa Alameldin	(Russia) Imran Aliev	(Iran) Alireza Abdevali	(Turkey) Alperen Berber	(Georgia (country)) Achiko Bolkvadze	(Belarus) Abubakar Khaslakhanau	(Iran) Fardin Hedayati
2024	(Iran) Ali Ahmadi Vafa	(Iran) Mohammad Mehdi Gholampour	(Russia) Erzu Zakriev	(Iran) Ahmad Reza Mohsennejad	(Russia) Zaur Beslekoev	(Iran) Alireza Abdevali	(Kazakhstan) Islam Yevloyev	(Kyrgyzstan) Asan Zhanyshov	(Ukraine) Yehor Yakushenko	(Hungary) László Darabos
2025	(Iran) Payam Ahmadi	(Azerbaijan) Aykhan Javadov	(Uzbekistan) Aytjan Khalmakhanov	(Kyrgyzstan) Zhantoro Mirzaliev	(Armenia) Gaspar TerteryanBeslekoev	(Georgia (country)) Anri Putkaradze	Mikhail Shkarin	(Georgia (country)) Luka Kochalidze	(Ukraine) Yehor Yakushenko	Ali Iliasov
2026	(Iran) Armin Shamsipour	(Azerbaijan) Aykhan Javadov	(Uzbekistan) Kuvonchbek Ismoilov	(Kazakhstan) Kazybek Kalmagambetov	(Russia) Mingiian Goriaev	(Armenia) Samvel Terteryan	(Russia) Ramazan Nekhai	(Japan) Taizo Yoshida	(Ukraine) Yehor Yakushenko	(Russia) Ali Iliasov

== List of 23 and Under World Champions in Men's Greco-Roman Wrestling ==
=== U-23 Worlds, 2017 ===
Year	59 kg	66 kg	71 kg	75 kg	80 kg	85 kg	98 kg	130 kg
2017	(Japan) Masuto Kawana	(Georgia (country)) Shmagi Bolkvadze	(Moldova) Daniel Cataraga	(Turkey) Fatih Cengiz	(Turkey) Burhan Akbudak	(Hungary) Erik Szilvássy	(Russia) Aleksandr Golovin	(Russia) Sergey Semenov

=== U-23 Worlds, 2018– ===
Year	55 kg	60 kg	63 kg	67 kg	72 kg	77 kg	82 kg	87 kg	97 kg	130 kg
2018	(Georgia (country)) Nugzari Tsurtsumia	(Japan) Kenichiro Fumita	(Japan) Katsuaki Endo	(Egypt) Mohamed Ibrahim	(Turkey) Cengiz Arslan	(Moldova) Daniel Cataraga	(Georgia (country)) Gela Bolkvadze	(Ukraine) Semen Novikov	(Russia) Aleksandr Golovin	(Georgia (country)) Zviadi Pataridze
2019	(Japan) Shota Ogawa	(Armenia) Armen Melikyan	(Iran) Meisam Dalkhani	(Egypt) Mohamed Ibrahim	(Iran) Mohammad Reza Geraei	(Russia) Islam Opiev	(Russia) Milad Alirzaev	(Ukraine) Semen Novikov	(Finland) Arvi Savolainen	(Iran) Ali Akbar Yousefi
2020	No competition held	No competition held	No competition held	No competition held	No competition held	No competition held	No competition held	No competition held	No competition held	No competition held
2021	(Russia) Mavlud Rizmanov	(Russia) Anvar Allakhiarov	(Georgia (country)) Leri Abuladze	(Azerbaijan) Hasrat Jafarov	(Germany) Idris Ibaev	(Hungary) Tamás Lévai	(Georgia (country)) Aivengo Rikadze	(Russia) Aleksandr Komarov	(Russia) Artur Sargsian	(Iran) Amin Mirzazadeh
2022	(Iran) Pouya Dadmarz	(Turkey) Kerem Kamal	(Iran) Iman Mohammadi	(Iran) Danial Sohrabi	(Azerbaijan) Gurban Gurbanov	(Armenia) Malkhas Amoyan	(Norway) Exauce Mukubu	(Hungary) István Takács	(Hungary) Alex Szőke	(Turkey) Fatih Bozkurt
2023	(Georgia (country)) Giorgi Tokhadze	(Authorised Neutral Athletes) Anvar Allakhiarov	(Authorised Neutral Athletes) Rakhman Tavmurzaev	(Kazakhstan) Sultan Assetuly	(Authorised Neutral Athletes) Dmitrii Adamov	(Moldova) Alexandrin Guţu	(Authorised Neutral Athletes) Aues Gonibov	(Authorised Neutral Athletes) Magomed Murtazaliev	(Authorised Neutral Athletes) Pavel Hlinchuk	(Turkey) Hamza Bakır
2024	(Iran) Ali Ahmadi Vafa	(Uzbekistan) Alisher Ganiev	(Moldova) Vitalie Eriomenco	(Kyrgyzstan) Razzak Beishekeev	(Georgia (country)) Giorgi Chkhikvadze	(Moldova) Alexandrin Guţu	(Iran) Mohammad Naghousi	(Authorised Neutral Athletes) Aues Gonibov	(Armenia) Hayk Khloyan	(Iran) Fardin Hedayati
2025	(Azerbaijan) Elmir Aliyev	(Japan) Koto Gomi	(Azerbaijan) Ziya Babashov	(Egypt) Hassan Abdelrehim	(Iran) Iman Mohammadi	(Ukraine) Irfan Mirzoiev	(Moldova) Alexandrin Guţu	(Iran) Gholamreza Farrokhi	(Ukraine) Yehor Yakushenko	(Iran) Fardin Hedayati
2026	(Georgia (country)) Koba Karumidze	(Kazakhstan) Aibek Aitbekov	(Iran) Erfan Jarkani	(Russia) Erzu Zakriev	(Kazakhstan) Yussuf Ashrapov	(Egypt) Moustafa Alameldin	(Iran) Abolfazl Mohmedi	(Iran) Yasin Yazdi	(Belarus) Abubakar Khaslakhanau	(China) Jiang Wenhao

== See also ==
- World Juniors Wrestling Championships
- List of World and Olympic Champions in Greco-Roman wrestling
- List of Cadet, Junior and U-23 World Champions in men's freestyle wrestling
