= Ahmet Peker =

Turkish wrestler (born 1989)

Personal information
- Full name: Ahmet Peker
- Nationality: Turkish
- Born: Ahmet Peker; November 4, 1989 (age 37) İskilip, Çorum Province, Turkey
- Height: 1.62 m (5.3 ft)
- Weight: 58 kg (128 lb)

Sport
- Sport: Sport wrestling
- Event: Freestyle
- Club: Bursa Büyükşehir Belediyespor Club in Bursa
- Coached by: İsmail Faikoğlu
Medal record
Men's Freestyle wrestling
Representing Turkey
European Championships
Bronze medal – third place	2012 Belgrade	55 kg
Mediterranean Games
Bronze medal – third place	2013 Mersin	55 kg
World Juniors Championships
Gold medal – first place	2009 Ankara	50 kg
Gold medal – first place	2008 Istanbul	50 kg
Gold medal – first place	2006 Guatemala City	50 kg
Bronze medal – third place	2007 Beijing	50 kg
University World Championships
Silver medal – second place	2016 Çorum	57 kg

Ahmet Peker (born November 4, 1989) is a Turkish sport wrestler in 55 kg division of Freestyle. The 1.62 m (5.3 ft) tall athlete is a member of Bursa Büyükşehir Belediyespor Club in Bursa, where he is coached by İsmail Faikoğlu. In 2009, he was named by FILA the best junior wrestler having won the most world championships.

He was born on November 4, 1989, in Harun village of Iskilip district in Çorum Province to Sadullah and his wife Hatice, a farmer family with five children. He began with wrestling at the Adil Candemir Wrestling Training Center in Çorum, and became a member of Amasya Şekerspor Club in Amasya after completing his education. Peker transferred to Bursa Büyükşehir Belediyespor when his club in Amasya closed.

Ahmet Peker is winner of several medals in cadets and juniors class at European and world level. He won the gold medal at the World Junior Wrestling Championships in 2006 held in Guatemala City, Guatemala, in 2008 held in Istanbul and in 2009 Ankara, Turkey. He became the gold medalist at the European Juniors Wrestling Championships in 2007 held at Belgrade, Serbia and in 2009 at Tbilisi, Georgia. He won the bronze medal at the 2012 European Wrestling Championships held in Belgrade, Serbia.

Peker competed at the 2012 Summer Olympics.

In 2016, he won the silver medal in the men's 57 kg event at the 2016 World University Wrestling Championships held in Çorum, Turkey.
