= Yuriy Ovcharenko (wrestler) =

Soviet wrestler and Ukrainian politician

- Овчаренко Юрій Іванович

Mayor of Kolomyia
- In office 26 March 2006 – 31 October 2010
- Preceded by: Bohdan Yurashchuk
- Succeeded by: Ihor Sliuzar

Personal details
- Born: 8 January 1966 (age 60) Kolomyia, Ivano-Frankivsk region, Ukrainian SSR, Soviet Union (now Ukraine)
- Other political affiliations: Independent
- Education: Kyiv Agricultural Institute

Yuriy Ovcharenko
Sport
- Country: Soviet Union
- Sport: Wrestling
- Weight class: 81, 87, 90 kg
- Event: Freestyle
- Club: "Trud" Kolomyia
- Team: Soviet Union
- Coached by: Yevstakhiy Hrabchuk
Medal record
Men's freestyle wrestling
Representing Soviet Union
Junior World Championships
Gold medal – first place	1983 Oak Lawn	81 kg

Yuriy Ivanovych Ovcharenko (Ukrainian: Юрій Іванович Овчаренко; born 8 January 1966) is a Soviet former wrestler and junior world champion in freestyle wrestling. He was also a mayor of Kolomyia in 2006-2010.

== Career ==
He trained at the local junior and youth sports school No. 1 with his brother Oleksandr, a silver medalist of the USSR Junior Wrestling Championships and Ukrainian SSR Championships gold medalist. His coach was Yevstakhiy Hrabchuk.

In January 1983, Ovcharenko represented his club "Trud" at the USSR Junior Wrestling Championships, held in Dnipropetrovsk, receiving a gold medal in the 87 kg event. In September, he won a gold medal at the World Junior Wrestling Championships in Oak Lawn in the 81 kg event, representing Soviet Union. In September 1985, he won a gold medal at the 16th international competition named after Ali Aliyev, held in Mahachkala, in the 90 kg event. At the age of 21, Yuriy Ovcharenko finished his sport career after marrying.

== Later life ==
In order to get an education, he graduated from the Kyiv Agricultural Academy. And together with his partners, he founded the Berkut cooperative: in the rented premises of the current Narodnyi Dim, he provided services in the form of computer games. Later, Ovcharenko got involved in public catering. And from 1998 to the present day, Yuriy Ovcharenko and his partners have been managing the grain processing company UMAS.

In March 2006, Ovcharenko was elected as a major of Kolomyia, his native town, which ruled to October 2010.

In 2014, he was a candidate for the National Deputy of Ukraine from political party "Block of Petro Poroshenko".
