= Joe Melchiore =

American freestyle wrestler (born 1966)

Personal information
- Nationality: American
- Born: 1966 (age 59–60)

Sport
- Sport: Freestyle wrestling

Achievements and titles
- World finals: 7th (1990)
Medal record
Men's freestyle wrestling
Representing United States
US Open Championships
Gold medal – first place	1990 Las Vegas	125.5 lb
Big Eight Championships
Gold medal – first place	1986 Iowa City	118 lb
World Junior Championships
Gold medal – first place	1983 Oak Lawn	56 kg

Joe Melchiore (born 1966) is an American freestyle wrestler and wrestling coach. He took the 1983 Wrestling World Junior Championships, winning the gold medal in the men's 56 kg category.

== Highlight achievements ==
• 1983 World Junior Champion, 56 kg.

• 1986 Big Eight Conference Champion, 118 lb (48 kg).

• 1990 U.S. Open Champion, 125.5 lb (57 kg).

• At the 1990 World Team Trials Challenge tournament was held in 30 May, Philadelphia, Joe Melchiore defeated 1989 NCAA and future 1996 Olympic Champion Kendall Cross via points and a technical fall to win the best-of-three series and earn his spot on Team USA for the international tournaments.

• Joe Melchiore competed at the 1990 World Championships where he placed seventh. He pinned Olympic Champion Shaban Trstena.

• He wrestled collegiately for Oklahoma Sooners (1985–86) and University of Iowa (1987–89) where he was a four-time All-American. In Iowa, he competed under legendary coach Dan Gable.
