= James Carr (wrestler) =

American wrestler (1955–2013)

Jimmy Carr
Personal information
- Full name: James Emmet Carr
- Born: January 28, 1955 Erie, Pennsylvania, U.S.
- Died: August 15, 2013 (aged 58) Erie, Pennsylvania, U.S.

Sport
- Country: United States
- Sport: Wrestling
- Events: Freestyle and Folkstyle
- College team: Kentucky
- Team: USA
Medal record
Men's freestyle wrestling
Representing the United States
Junior World Championships
Gold medal – first place	1973 Miami Beach	57 kg

James Emmet "Jimmy" Carr (January 28, 1955 – August 15, 2013) was an American freestyle and folkstyle wrestler. Carr was the youngest Olympian in U.S. wrestling history, competing at the 1972 Summer Olympics while still in high school as a 17-year-old. He also competed at the 1971 World Wrestling Championships at 52 kg (114.5 pounds) as a 16-year-old.

Carr was a Junior World Champion in 1973. As a college wrestler, he was an NCAA All-American for Kentucky, placing fifth at the 1977 NCAA Championships at 126 pounds. He died on August 15, 2013, from complications from a motor vehicle crash at age 58.
