= Huh Byung-ho =

South Korean wrestler

Personal information
- Nationality: South Korean
- Born: 27 November 1966 (age 58)

Sport
- Sport: Wrestling

Huh Byung-ho (born 27 November 1966) is a South Korean wrestler. He competed at the 1988 Summer Olympics and the 1992 Summer Olympics.
