= 2007 World Junior Wrestling Championships =

Junior Wrestling Championships

- Host city: Beijing, China
- Dates: 20–26 August 2007

Champions
- Freestyle: Russia
- Greco-Roman: Russia
- Women: China

The 2007 World Junior Wrestling Championships were the 31st edition of the World Junior Wrestling Championships and were held in Beijing, China between 20 and 26 August 2007.

== Medal table ==
Rank	Nation	Gold	Silver	Bronze	Total
1	Russia	7	6	2	15
2	China	3	3	3	9
3	Iran	3	2	3	8
4	Turkey	2	4	3	9
5	United States	2	1	1	4
6	Ukraine	2	0	6	8
7	Armenia	1	2	0	3
8	Bulgaria	1	1	0	2
9	Sweden	1	0	4	5
10	Mongolia	1	0	2	3
11	Uzbekistan	1	0	0	1
12	Azerbaijan	0	2	3	5
13	India	0	1	1	2
13	Kazakhstan	0	1	1	2
15	Japan	0	1	0	1
16	Georgia	0	0	4	4
16	South Korea	0	0	4	4
18	Cuba	0	0	2	2
18	Germany	0	0	2	2
18	Kyrgyzstan	0	0	2	2
21	Belarus	0	0	1	1
21	Canada	0	0	1	1
21	Ecuador	0	0	1	1
21	Latvia	0	0	1	1
21	Poland	0	0	1	1
Totals (25 entries)		24	24	48	96

== Medal summary ==
=== Men's freestyle ===
Event	Gold	Silver	Bronze
50 kg	Tulga Dashpuntsag; Mongolia	Ogan Gikinyan; Armenia	Ahmet Peker; Turkey
50 kg	Tulga Dashpuntsag; Mongolia	Ogan Gikinyan; Armenia	David Berzmishvili; Georgia
55 kg	Dzhamal Otarsultanov; Russia	Sezer Akgül; Turkey	Aref Alizadeh; Iran
55 kg	Dzhamal Otarsultanov; Russia	Sezer Akgül; Turkey	Tim Schleicher; Germany
60 kg	Mehdi Taghavi; Iran	Ismail Emin Redzhep; Bulgaria	Jabrayil Hasanov; Azerbaijan
60 kg	Mehdi Taghavi; Iran	Ismail Emin Redzhep; Bulgaria	Khosbayar Batchuluun; Mongolia
66 kg	Bubba Jenkins; United States	Okay Köksal; Turkey	Saeed Dadashpoor; Iran
66 kg	Bubba Jenkins; United States	Okay Köksal; Turkey	Yun-Seok Lee; South Korea
74 kg	Denis Tsargush; Russia	Ayhan Sucu; Turkey	Gocha Lomtatidze; Georgia
74 kg	Denis Tsargush; Russia	Ayhan Sucu; Turkey	Agil Guliyev; Azerbaijan
84 kg	Abdul Ammaev; Uzbekistan	Anzor Urishev; Russia	Beka Chelidze; Georgia
84 kg	Abdul Ammaev; Uzbekistan	Anzor Urishev; Russia	Reineris Salas; Cuba
96 kg	Valerii Andriitsev; Ukraine	Alen Zasieiev; Russia	Rıza Yıldırım; Turkey
96 kg	Valerii Andriitsev; Ukraine	Alen Zasieiev; Russia	Komeil Ghasemi; Iran
120 kg	Bakhtiyar Akhmedov; Russia	Mohammad Azarshakib; Iran	Ali Gürbüz; Turkey
120 kg	Bakhtiyar Akhmedov; Russia	Mohammad Azarshakib; Iran	Deng Zhiwei; China

=== Greco-Roman ===
Event	Gold	Silver	Bronze
50 kg	Reza Asadpour; Iran	Gadir Suleymanov; Azerbaijan	Vasily Topoev; Russia
50 kg	Reza Asadpour; Iran	Gadir Suleymanov; Azerbaijan	Arsen Eraliev; Kyrgyzstan
55 kg	Aleksandar Kostadinov; Bulgaria	Feilong Wang; China	Maikel Anache; Cuba
55 kg	Aleksandar Kostadinov; Bulgaria	Feilong Wang; China	Azis Beishaliev; Kyrgyzstan
60 kg	Rahman Bilici; Turkey	Ibragim Labazanov; Russia	Ryu Han-su; South Korea
60 kg	Rahman Bilici; Turkey	Ibragim Labazanov; Russia	Konstantin Balitsky; Ukraine
66 kg	Ruslan Belkhoroev; Russia	Aibek Yensekhanov; Kazakhstan	Rafig Huseynov; Azerbaijan
66 kg	Ruslan Belkhoroev; Russia	Aibek Yensekhanov; Kazakhstan	Hyun-woo Kim; Russia
74 kg	Arsen Julfalakyan; Armenia	Elvin Mursaliyev; Azerbaijan	Magomed Askhabov; Russia
74 kg	Arsen Julfalakyan; Armenia	Elvin Mursaliyev; Azerbaijan	Aleksandrs Visnakovs; Latvia
84 kg	Amir Aliakbari; Iran	Artur Shahinyan; Armenia	Sergo Ninua; Georgia
84 kg	Amir Aliakbari; Iran	Artur Shahinyan; Armenia	Fredrik Schön; Sweden
96 kg	Ahmet Taçyıldız; Turkey	Davoud Gilneyrang; Iran	Oleg Kryoka; Ukraine
96 kg	Ahmet Taçyıldız; Turkey	Davoud Gilneyrang; Iran	Nurmakhan Tinaliyev; Kazakhstan
120 kg	Soslan Farniev; Russia	Rıza Kayaalp; Turkey	Artem Tsepovatenko; Ukraine
120 kg	Soslan Farniev; Russia	Rıza Kayaalp; Turkey	Ricardo Melz; Germany

=== Women's freestyle ===
Event	Gold	Silver	Bronze
44 kg	Elena Gnatenko; Russia	Lei Jingling; China	Sudesh Kumari; India
44 kg	Elena Gnatenko; Russia	Lei Jingling; China	Diana Piza; Ecuador
48 kg	Sofia Mattsson; Sweden	Fuyuko Mimura; Japan	Yan O China
48 kg	Sofia Mattsson; Sweden	Fuyuko Mimura; Japan	Alyssa Lampe; United States
51 kg	Whitney Conder; United States	Babita Kumari; India	Aleksandra Kogut; Ukraine
51 kg	Whitney Conder; United States	Babita Kumari; India	Li Xiaotang; China
55 kg	Hongmei Qiu; China	Ekaterina Krasnova; Russia	Hyang-Rae Hong; South Korea
55 kg	Hongmei Qiu; China	Ekaterina Krasnova; Russia	Johanna Mattsson; Sweden
59 kg	Song Ni Li; China	Tatiana Suarez; United States	Katerina Dombrovska; Ukraine
59 kg	Song Ni Li; China	Tatiana Suarez; United States	Agata Pietrzyk; Poland
63 kg	Yuliya Ostapchuk; Ukraine	Ekaterina Melnikova; Russia	Hanna Beliayeva; Belarus
63 kg	Yuliya Ostapchuk; Ukraine	Ekaterina Melnikova; Russia	Stacie Anaka; Canada
67 kg	Natalya Laushkina; Russia	Zhang Fengliu; China	Ochirbatyn Nasanburmaa; Mongolia
67 kg	Natalya Laushkina; Russia	Zhang Fengliu; China	Emma Weberg; Sweden
72 kg	Jiao Wang; China	Ekaterina Bukina; Russia	Jenny Fransson; Sweden
72 kg	Jiao Wang; China	Ekaterina Bukina; Russia	Oksana Vashchuk; Ukraine
