= 1973 World Junior Wrestling Championships =

Junior Wrestling Championships

- Host city: Miami Beach, United States
- Dates: 1973

Champions
- Freestyle: Soviet Union
- Greco-Roman: Soviet Union

The 1973 World Junior Wrestling Championships were the third edition of the World Junior Wrestling Championships and were held in Miami Beach, United States 1973.

== Medal table ==
Rank	Nation	Gold	Silver	Bronze	Total
1	Soviet Union	8	6	2	16
2	Bulgaria	5	5	4	14
3	Romania	3	1	0	4
4	Japan	2	3	2	7
5	United States	1	3	3	7
6	Sweden	1	1	1	3
7	Austria	0	1	0	1
8	East Germany	0	0	3	3
9	Italy	0	0	2	2
9	West Germany	0	0	2	2
11	Canada	0	0	1	1
Totals (11 entries)		20	20	20	60

== Medal summary ==
=== Men's freestyle ===
Event	Gold	Silver	Bronze
48 kg	Nermedin Selimov; Bulgaria	Telman; Soviet Union	Brighton; United States
52 kg	Kaoru Funatsu; Japan	Brown; United States	Amangeldi; Soviet Union
57 kg	Jimmy Carr; United States	Toshimitsu Ota; Japan	Valentin Getsov; Bulgaria
62 kg	Kazunori Ganiko; Japan	Koning; Austria	Dontcho; Bulgaria
68 kg	Musa; Soviet Union	Chuck Yagla; United States	Hiranuma Yoshinori; Japan
74 kg	Magomed; Soviet Union	Carr (II); United States	Richard Deschatelets; Canada
82 kg	Mustafov (II); Bulgaria	Miyoshi Oyanagi; Japan	Jackson (II); United States
90 kg	Ortusuev; Soviet Union	Milev (II); Bulgaria	Bruno Kastner; West Germany
100 kg	Salman Hashimikov; Soviet Union	Ratshev; Bulgaria	Roland Gehrke; East Germany
+100 kg	Strastew; Bulgaria	Tichuadse; Soviet Union	Coryea; United States

=== Men's Greco-Roman ===
Event	Gold	Silver	Bronze
48 kg	Constantin Alexandru; Romania	Zakirov; Soviet Union	Antonio Caltabiano; Italy
52 kg	Nicu Gingă; Romania	Susumu Hagiwara; Japan	Kilas Akhmedov; Soviet Union
57 kg	Ion Dulica; Romania	Per Lindholm; Sweden	Antonio Cruciata; Italy
62 kg	Nelson Davidyan; Soviet Union	Pantelimon Arcade; Romania	Pashov; Bulgaria
68 kg	Anatoly Bykov; Soviet Union	Hristo Trajkov; Bulgaria	H. Wolter; East Germany
74 kg	Lejawa; Soviet Union	Lozew; Bulgaria	Persson; Sweden
82 kg	Frank Andersson; Sweden	Tamas Kiknadse; Soviet Union	Dimitrov II; Bulgaria
90 kg	Vassil Koichov; Bulgaria	Babiashvili; Soviet Union	Nehls; East Germany
100 kg	Mikhail Saladze; Soviet Union	Kirilov; Bulgaria	Pedro Pawlidis; West Germany
+100 kg	Nikolov; Bulgaria	Aleksandr Kolchinsky; Soviet Union	Kiyoshi Matsunaga; Japan
