= Ruslan Belkhoroev =

Russian Greco-Roman wrestler

Руслан Белхороев Ruslan Belkhoroev
Personal information
- Native name: Russian: Руслан Курейшевич Белхороев
- Full name: Ruslan Kureishevich Belkhoroev
- Born: 22 March 1987 (age 39) Sunzha, Checheno-Ingush ASSR, Soviet Union
- Height: 172 cm (5 ft 8 in)

Sport
- Country: Russia
- Sport: Wrestling
- Weight class: 66–74 kg
- Rank: International Master of sports
- Event: Greco-Roman
- Coached by: Askhab Belkhoroev, Asludin Abaev, Felix Avakov, Oleg Dyushko
Medal record
Men's Greco-Roman
Representing Russia
European Championships
Bronze medal – third place	2008 Tampere	66 kg

Ruslan Kureishevich Belkhoroev (Russian: Руслан Курейшевич Белхороев; born 22 March 1987) is a retired Russian Greco-Roman wrestler of Ingush ethnicity, who claimed the bronze medal at the 2008 European Championships.

== Background ==
Belkhoroev was born in Sunzha, Checheno-Ingush ASSR, Soviet Union into an Ingush family on 22 March 1987. He started Greco-Roman wrestling when he turned 16. His first coach was his father, Askhab Belkhoroev.

== Sport career ==
He received his first gold medal at the international level during the 2004 Cadet European Championships in Albena, Bulgaria. In 2006, he received a bronze medal at the Junior World Championships. One year later, he became a junior world champion at 66 kilos. In 2008, Ruslan earned the bronze medal for the Russian team at the European Championships in Tampere, Finland. He also won the Ziolkowski-Pytlasinski tournament in Poland that year. In 2010, he took first place at the Vantaa cup and Ivan Poddubny Tournament in the 74 kilogram weight class. In 2011, he was runner-up at the "Torneo Citta a Sassari" international tournament in Italy and first place at the Oleg Karavayev memorial held in Minsk, Belarus. In 2012, Belkhoroev made his debut at the "Copa Brasil" in Brazil, where he competed in the men's freestyle wrestling 74 kg event and became a finalist.

== Achievements ==
- 2004 Cadet European Championships — 1st;
- 2006 Junior World Championships — 3rd;
- 2007 Junior World Championships — 1st;
- 2008 European Championships — 3rd;
- 2008 Ziolkowski-Pytlasinski Tournament — 1st;
- 2009 Ivan Poddubny Tournament — 3rd;
- 2010 Vantaa cup — 1st;
- 2010 Ivan Poddubny Tournament — 1st;
- 2011 Torneo Citta a Sassari — 2nd
- 2011 Oleg Karavayev memorial — 1st;
- 2012 Grand Prix of Spain — 3rd;
- 2012 Copa Brasil — 2nd;

== Personal life ==
He is a graduate of the Ingush State University, Russian Presidential Academy of National Economy and Public Administration and the Moscow Institute of Physical Culture and Sports. Also, Belkhoroev is the president of the Ingushetian wrestling federation.
