= 2001 World Junior Wrestling Championships =

Junior Wrestling Championships

- Host city: Tashkent, Uzbekistan Greco-Roman, Men's freestyle Martigny, Switzerland Women's freestyle
- Dates: 11–12 May 2001; 19 - 22 April 2001

Champions
- Freestyle: Russia
- Greco-Roman: Russia
- Women: Japan

The 2001 World Junior Wrestling Championships were the 27th edition of the World Junior Wrestling Championships and were held in the Greco-Romane and the men's Freestyle style in Tashkent, and the women's freestyle in Martigny.

== Medal table ==
Rank	Nation	Gold	Silver	Bronze	Total
1	Russia	5	8	5	18
2	Iran	3	3	2	8
3	Georgia	3	1	0	4
4	Japan	3	0	2	5
5	India	2	0	1	3
6	Germany	2	0	0	2
7	Uzbekistan	1	2	1	4
8	Canada	1	1	3	5
9	Armenia	1	1	1	3
9	France	1	1	1	3
11	Turkey	1	0	5	6
12	Kazakhstan	1	0	1	2
13	Azerbaijan	1	0	0	1
13	Kyrgyzstan	1	0	0	1
15	Poland	0	2	0	2
16	Ukraine	0	1	2	3
17	Greece	0	1	1	2
17	United States	0	1	1	2
19	Bulgaria	0	1	0	1
19	North Korea	0	1	0	1
19	Romania	0	1	0	1
19	South Korea	0	1	0	1
Totals (22 entries)		26	26	26	78

== Medal summary ==
=== Men's freestyle ===
Event	Gold	Silver	Bronze
50 kg	Amiran Elbakidze; Georgia	Mavlet Batirov; Russia	Ersin Çetin; Turkey
54 kg	Dilshod Mansurov; Uzbekistan	Besarion Gochashvili; Georgia	Yury Holub; Ukraine
58 kg	Ulan Nadyrbek Uulu; Kyrgyzstan	Meiromzhan Beisebaev; Kazakhstan	Nejad Haghi Mohammad; Iran
63 kg	Shalva Muziashvili; Georgia	Dshankongir Abdurakhmanov; Uzbekistan	Alan Dudayev; Russia
69 kg	Ramesh Kumar; India	Ashet Usupov; Russia	Yazdan Rajabi; Iran
76 kg	Sergey Vitkovski; Russia	Mehdi Hajizadeh; Iran	Garsevan Vardanyan; Armenia
85 kg	Khadzhimurat Gatsalov; Russia	Kyung-Min Jun; South Korea	Osman Özgüven; Turkey
97 kg	Mohammad Khaleghi Far; Iran	Magomed Ibragimov; Uzbekistan	Taimuraz Tigiyev; Russia
130 kg	Palwinder Singh Cheema; India	Yasser Nourzaee; Iran	Bagrat Chutaba; Russia

=== Greco-Roman ===
Event	Gold	Silver	Bronze
50 kg	Roman Amoyan; Armenia	Ilya Sagalaev; Russia	Aydin Sarsekeev; Kazakhstan
54 kg	Asset Imanbayev; Kazakhstan	Ge Lee; North Korea	Mukesh Khatri; India
58 kg	Şeref Tüfenk; Turkey	Eusebiu Diaconu; Romania	Oleksandr Khvoshch; Ukraine
63 kg	Farid Mansurov; Azerbaijan	Valentin Novikov; Russia	Hassan Heydari; Iran
69 kg	Andrei Demankin; Russia	Armen Vardanyan; Ukraine	Selçuk Çebi; Turkey
76 kg	Majid Ramezani; Iran	Nikolai Kurakov; Russia	Jahongir Turdiev; Uzbekistan
85 kg	Massoud Hashemizadeh; Iran	Arthur Mikolajczyk; Poland	Hamdi Eraslankılıç; Turkey
97 kg	Ramazi Devadze; Georgia	Robert Petrosyan; Armenia	Georgios Koutsioubas; Greece
130 kg	Khasan Baroev; Russia	Nikola Iliev; Bulgaria	Yücel Ünsal; Turkey

=== Women's freestyle ===
Event	Gold	Silver	Bronze
43 kg	Momoko Sera; Japan	Audrey Carrasco; Canada	Alexandra Shvedova; Russia
46 kg	Brigitte Wagner; Germany	Myriam Prost; France	Airi Funatsu; Japan
50 kg	Chiharu Icho; Japan	Natalia Gushina; Russia	Lindsay Rushton Prickett; Canada
54 kg	Vanessa Boubryemm; France	Kostantina Tsibanakou; Greece	Viktoria Zatchainova; Russia
58 kg	Saori Yoshida; Japan	Lubov Volosova; Russia	Breanne Graham; Canada
63 kg	Tara Rose Hedican; Canada	Daria Nazarova; Russia	Tori Adams; United States
68 kg	Anita Schätzle; Germany	Toccara Montgomery; United States	Mimi Sugawara; Japan
75 kg	Anastasia Dejneva; Russia	Anna Wawrzycka; Poland	Pamela Wilson; Canada
