= 2000 World Junior Wrestling Championships =

Junior Wrestling Championships

- Host city: Nantes, France
- Dates: 3-9 July 2000

Champions
- Freestyle: Russia
- Greco-Roman: Ukraine
- Women: Japan

The 2000 World Junior Wrestling Championships were the 26th edition of the World Junior Wrestling Championships and were held in Nantes, France between 3-9 July 2000.

== Medal table ==
Rank	Nation	Gold	Silver	Bronze	Total
1	Russia	5	3	5	13
2	Japan	5	0	1	6
3	Ukraine	4	1	4	9
4	Kazakhstan	3	0	0	3
5	Germany	2	0	0	2
6	United States	1	6	1	8
7	Iran	1	3	3	7
8	Uzbekistan	1	1	1	3
9	Georgia	1	0	1	2
10	Azerbaijan	1	0	0	1
10	Hungary	1	0	0	1
10	Israel	1	0	0	1
13	Turkey	0	5	0	5
14	Poland	0	3	1	4
15	Greece	0	1	1	2
15	Sweden	0	1	1	2
17	Belarus	0	1	0	1
17	Romania	0	1	0	1
19	Bulgaria	0	0	2	2
20	Czech Republic	0	0	1	1
20	Finland	0	0	1	1
20	Kyrgyzstan	0	0	1	1
20	Latvia	0	0	1	1
20	Yugoslavia	0	0	1	1
Totals (24 entries)		26	26	26	78

== Medal summary ==
=== Men's freestyle ===
Event	Gold	Silver	Bronze
50 kg	Dilshod Mansurov; Uzbekistan	Timothy Hill; United States	Hassan Rangraz; Iran
54 kg	Alexandr Kontoyev; Russia	Jason Powell; United States	Alireza Darvishi; Iran
58 kg	Abil Ibragimov; Kazakhstan	Tevfik Odabaşı; Turkey	Vasyl Fedoryshyn; Ukraine
63 kg	Iosif Momcelidze; Kazakhstan	Ömer Çubukçu; Turkey	Irbek Farniev; Russia
69 kg	Murat Umarov; Russia	Mostafa Alizadeh; Iran	Jared Lawrence; United States
76 kg	Majid Ramezani; Iran	Fatih Koyuncu; Turkey	Murad Gaidarov; Russia
85 kg	Sazhid Sazhidov; Russia	Shahab Ghorbani; Iran	Taras Danko; Ukraine
97 kg	Oleg Kallagov; Russia	Tommy Rowlands; United States	Davit Otiashvili; Georgia
130 kg	Ivan Ishchenko; Ukraine	Bahman Tayebi; Iran	Bagrat Chutaba; Russia

=== Greco-Roman ===
Event	Gold	Silver	Bronze
50 kg	Ceyhun Zaidov; Azerbaijan	Muhammadumar Madaminov; Uzbekistan	Shergazy Kaparov; Kyrgyzstan
54 kg	Asset Imanbayev; Kazakhstan	Mücahit Vardal; Turkey	Aleksey Vakulenko; Ukraine
58 kg	Ivan Alexandrov; Israel	Eusebiu Diaconu; Romania	Jarkko Ala-Huikku; Finland
63 kg	Armen Vardanyan; Ukraine	Youri Kaliasnev; Belarus	Ivo Minkov; Bulgaria
69 kg	Volodymyr Shatskykh; Ukraine	Joseph Privitere; United States	Parviz Zeidvand; Iran
76 kg	István Szabó; Hungary	Zafer Başar; Turkey	Youry Vitt; Uzbekistan
85 kg	Sergey Rutenko; Ukraine	Jimmy Lidberg; Sweden	Bojan Mijatov; Yugoslavia
97 kg	Khasan Baroev; Russia	Georgios Koutsioubas; Greece	Kaloyan Dinchev; Bulgaria
130 kg	Georgiy Tsurtsumi; Georgia	Michael Shvidkiy; Ukraine	Xenofon Koutsioumpas; Greece

=== Women's freestyle ===
Event	Gold	Silver	Bronze
43 kg	Sarah Ehinger; Germany	Mary Kelly; United States	Momoko Sera; Japan
46 kg	Kanako Miki; Japan	Katarzyna Zalewska; Poland	Iryna Merleni; Ukraine
50 kg	Chiharu Icho; Japan	Iwona Matkowska; Poland	Natalia Gushina; Russia
54 kg	Seiko Yamamoto; Japan	Alena Kartashova; Russia	Diana Djachenko; Latvia
58 kg	Saori Yoshida; Japan	Lubov Volosova; Russia	Anna Liz Holk; Sweden
63 kg	Ayako Shōda; Japan	Daria Nazarova; Russia	Monika Michalik; Poland
68 kg	Anita Schätzle; Germany	Toccara Montgomery; United States	Natalya Gavrilova; Russia
75 kg	Dominique Smalley; United States	Kamila Zgolak; Poland	Kateřina Halová; Czech Republic
