= 1969 World Junior Wrestling Championships =

Junior Wrestling Championships

- Host city: Boulder, Colorado, United States
- Dates: July, 1969

Champions
- Freestyle: United States
- Greco-Roman: Soviet Union

The 1969 World Junior Wrestling Championships were the first edition of the World Junior Wrestling Championships and were held in Boulder, Colorado, United States 1969.

== Medal table ==
Rank	Nation	Gold	Silver	Bronze	Total
1	Soviet Union	10	5	4	19
2	United States	5	3	6	14
3	Bulgaria	3	7	3	13
4	Japan	2	3	3	8
5	Sweden	0	2	0	2
6	West Germany	0	0	3	3
7	Canada	0	0	1	1
Totals (7 entries)		20	20	20	60

== Medal summary ==
=== Men's freestyle ===
Event	Gold	Silver	Bronze
48 kg	Ilarion Fedoseev; Soviet Union	Jim Bissell; United States	Klaus Wollmer; West Germany
52 kg	Bill Martin; United States	Satoshi Ueda; Japan	Semyon Makarov; Soviet Union
57 kg	Larry Morgan; United States	Lutidze; Soviet Union	Teruhiko Miyahara; Japan
62 kg	Katsuhiko Saito; Japan	Larry Little; United States	Mikhail Andreasyan; Soviet Union
68 kg	Kikuo Wada; Japan	Gapis Gadshiev; Soviet Union	Josef Engel; Bulgaria
74 kg	Akako Chochashvili; Soviet Union	Yukihiro Chiba; Japan	Roger Duty; United States
82 kg	Richard Binek; United States	Koba Davitashvili; Soviet Union	Atsushi Izawa; Japan
90 kg	Billy Bragg; United States	Tamazi Gegeshidze; Soviet Union	Taras Hryb; Canada
100 kg	Mike Brundage; United States	Georgi Baitshev; Bulgaria	Vladimir Pilev; Soviet Union
+100 kg	Soslan Andiyev; Soviet Union	Stefan Jeliaskov; Bulgaria	Jeff Jackson; United States

=== Men's Greco-Roman ===
Event	Gold	Silver	Bronze
48 kg	Liben Chosupov; Bulgaria	Felix Grigorian; Soviet Union	Bill Davids; United States
52 kg	Aleksander Kustov; Soviet Union	Yoshiyuki Usui; Japan	Dmitry Avramov; Bulgaria
57 kg	Krasimir Stefanov; Bulgaria	Lars-Erik Skiöld; Sweden	Radik Ibragimov; Soviet Union
62 kg	Mansur Bairamov; Soviet Union	Stoyan Lazarov; Bulgaria	Doug Willer; United States
68 kg	Stefan Laudenov; Bulgaria	Torbjörn Hillberg; Sweden	Bill Eisenheimer; United States
74 kg	Ruben Karapetyan; Soviet Union	Peter Slavtchev; Bulgaria	Date; Japan
82 kg	Aleksey Stativka; Soviet Union	Ivan Ivanov; Bulgaria	Richard Rotter; West Germany
90 kg	Petr Tichtchenko; Soviet Union	Dimitar Ivanov; Bulgaria	Helmut Gerlach; West Germany
100 kg	Akaki Meladze; Soviet Union	Vassil Koichov; Bulgaria	Steve Clark; United States
+100 kg	Shota Morshiladse; Soviet Union	Alan Thompson; United States	Petar Stantchev; Bulgaria
