= 2005 World Junior Wrestling Championships =

Junior Wrestling Championships

- Host city: Vilnius, Lithuania
- Dates: 4-10 July 2005

Champions
- Freestyle: Russia
- Greco-Roman: Turkey
- Women: Japan

The 2005 World Junior Wrestling Championships were the 29th edition of the World Junior Wrestling Championships and were held in Vilnius, Lithuania between 4-10 July 2005.

== Medal table ==
Rank	Nation	Gold	Silver	Bronze	Total
1	Russia	7	2	5	14
2	Iran	3	3	2	8
3	Japan	3	2	3	8
4	Ukraine	2	0	5	7
5	Kyrgyzstan	2	0	2	4
5	Sweden	2	0	2	4
7	United States	1	3	2	6
8	Turkey	1	3	1	5
9	Uzbekistan	1	1	1	3
10	Bulgaria	1	0	2	3
11	Serbia and Montenegro	1	0	0	1
12	Georgia	0	2	2	4
13	India	0	2	0	2
14	Belarus	0	1	6	7
15	Armenia	0	1	2	3
15	Germany	0	1	2	3
17	Hungary	0	1	1	2
18	Romania	0	1	0	1
18	Vietnam	0	1	0	1
20	Azerbaijan	0	0	2	2
20	Lithuania	0	0	2	2
22	Austria	0	0	1	1
22	Canada	0	0	1	1
22	Greece	0	0	1	1
22	Kazakhstan	0	0	1	1
22	Latvia	0	0	1	1
22	Poland	0	0	1	1
Totals (27 entries)		24	24	48	96

== Medal summary ==
=== Men's freestyle ===
Event	Gold	Silver	Bronze
50 kg	Iliaz Ozumbekov; Kyrgyzstan	Sumit Sumit; India	Patrick McCaffery; United States
50 kg	Iliaz Ozumbekov; Kyrgyzstan	Sumit Sumit; India	Bahar Jalali; Iran
55 kg	Besik Kudukhov; Russia	Yasuhiro Inaba; Japan	Farkhad Urazimbetov; Uzbekistan
55 kg	Besik Kudukhov; Russia	Yasuhiro Inaba; Japan	Mostafa Aghajaniozonbalagh; Iran
60 kg	Vagiv Kaziev; Russia	Malkhaz Zarkua; Georgia	Noriyuki Takatsuka; Japan
60 kg	Vagiv Kaziev; Russia	Malkhaz Zarkua; Georgia	Bauyrzhan Orazgaliyev; Kazakhstan
66 kg	Shamil Batirov; Russia	Nasrullah Fadaei; Iran	Kohei Fujimoto; Japan
66 kg	Shamil Batirov; Russia	Nasrullah Fadaei; Iran	Leonid Bazan; Ukraine
74 kg	Mihail Ganev; Bulgaria	Albert Saritov; Russia	Elnur Aliev; Azerbaijan
74 kg	Mihail Ganev; Bulgaria	Albert Saritov; Russia	Harutyun Yenokyan; Armenia
84 kg	Georgy Ketoev; Russia	Rasool Tavakoli; Iran	Viktor Mukha; Ukraine
84 kg	Georgy Ketoev; Russia	Rasool Tavakoli; Iran	Nikoloz Gagnidze; Georgia
96 kg	Amir Abbas Moradi Ganji; Iran	Rıza Yıldırım; Turkey	Rufat Guelhan; Bulgaria
96 kg	Amir Abbas Moradi Ganji; Iran	Rıza Yıldırım; Turkey	Tokhtar Temrezov; Russia
120 kg	Bilyal Makhov; Russia	Bachana Karanadze; Georgia	Bode Ogunwole; United States
120 kg	Bilyal Makhov; Russia	Bachana Karanadze; Georgia	Maksim Mikhailevich; Belarus

=== Greco-Roman ===
Event	Gold	Silver	Bronze
50 kg	Elbek Toyiev; Uzbekistan	Shavigh Gevorgyan; Armenia	Andrey Pilichev; Russia
50 kg	Elbek Toyiev; Uzbekistan	Shavigh Gevorgyan; Armenia	Peter Modos; Hungary
55 kg	Hamid Sourian; Iran	Sherali Shodmanov; Uzbekistan	Rovshan Bayramov; Azerbaijan
55 kg	Hamid Sourian; Iran	Sherali Shodmanov; Uzbekistan	Revaz Lashkhi; Georgia
60 kg	Davor Štefanek; Serbia and Montenegro	Baki Yürüker; Turkey	Aleksandr Kazakevich; Lithuania
60 kg	Davor Štefanek; Serbia and Montenegro	Baki Yürüker; Turkey	Rinat Usupyanov; Kyrgyzstan
66 kg	Refik Ayvazoğlu; Turkey	Ionel Puscasu; Romania	Nikolai Savchenko; Ukraine
66 kg	Refik Ayvazoğlu; Turkey	Ionel Puscasu; Romania	Krzysztof Kowalski; Poland
74 kg	Davoud Abedinzadeh; Iran	Renato Kun; Hungary	Plamen Palev; Ukraine
74 kg	Davoud Abedinzadeh; Iran	Renato Kun; Hungary	Valery Palenski; Belarus
84 kg	Yanarbek Kenyeev; Kyrgyzstan	Ghasem Rezaei; Iran	Artur Shahinyan; Armenia
84 kg	Yanarbek Kenyeev; Kyrgyzstan	Ghasem Rezaei; Iran	Denni Lipic; Sweden
96 kg	Sergey Sabinin; Russia	Mehmet Kasım Aras; Germany	Muhammed Sadin Bakır; Turkey
96 kg	Sergey Sabinin; Russia	Mehmet Kasım Aras; Germany	Robertas Budris; Lithuania
120 kg	Jalmar Sjöberg; Sweden	İsmail Güzel; Turkey	Panagiotis Papadopoulos; Greece
120 kg	Jalmar Sjöberg; Sweden	İsmail Güzel; Turkey	Bilyal Makhov; Russia

=== Women's freestyle ===
Event	Gold	Silver	Bronze
44 kg	Mariya Stadnik; Ukraine	Thi Hang Nguyen; Vietnam	Annika Hofmann; Germany
44 kg	Mariya Stadnik; Ukraine	Thi Hang Nguyen; Vietnam	Megumi Shinto; Japan
48 kg	Lorissa Oorzak; Russia	Sara Fulp-Allen; United States	Maryna Markevich; Belarus
48 kg	Lorissa Oorzak; Russia	Sara Fulp-Allen; United States	Lyudmyla Balushka; Ukraine
51 kg	Aleksandra Kogut; Ukraine	Nanae Suzuki; Japan	Olga Gilova; Russia
51 kg	Aleksandra Kogut; Ukraine	Nanae Suzuki; Japan	Zhuldyz Eshimova-Turtbayeva; Kyrgyzstan
55 kg	Johanna Mattsson; Sweden	Danyelle Hedin; United States	Olena Malyshko; Ukraine
55 kg	Johanna Mattsson; Sweden	Danyelle Hedin; United States	Alena Filipava; Belarus
59 kg	Kei Yamana; Japan	Yuliya Ratkevich; Belarus	Viktorija Grigorjeva; Latvia
59 kg	Kei Yamana; Japan	Yuliya Ratkevich; Belarus	Larissa Kanaeva; Russia
63 kg	Mio Nishimaki; Japan	Geetika Jakhar; India	Helena Allandi; Sweden
63 kg	Mio Nishimaki; Japan	Geetika Jakhar; India	Tasha Eady; Canada
67 kg	Mami Shinkai; Japan	Heather Martin; United States	Irina Shautsova; Belarus
67 kg	Mami Shinkai; Japan	Heather Martin; United States	Julia Weiss; Germany
72 kg	Ali Bernard; United States	Alena Starodubtseva; Russia	Vasilisa Marzaliuk; Belarus
72 kg	Ali Bernard; United States	Alena Starodubtseva; Russia	Marina Gastl; Austria
