= 1971 World Junior Wrestling Championships =

Junior Wrestling Championships

- Host city: Tokyo, Japan
- Dates: 1971

Champions
- Freestyle: Iran
- Greco-Roman: Soviet Union

The 1971 World Junior Wrestling Championships were the second edition of the World Junior Wrestling Championships and were held in Tokyo, Japan 1971.

== Medal table ==
Rank	Nation	Gold	Silver	Bronze	Total
1	Soviet Union	10	3	0	13
2	Iran	3	1	0	4
3	Bulgaria	2	8	3	13
4	United States	2	3	7	12
5	Japan	2	2	6	10
6	Turkey	1	0	0	1
7	Mongolia	0	1	1	2
7	South Korea	0	1	1	2
7	Sweden	0	1	1	2
10	Italy	0	0	1	1
Totals (10 entries)		20	20	20	60

== Medal summary ==
=== Men's freestyle ===
Event	Gold	Silver	Bronze
48 kg	Yoshiyuki Matsuhashi; Japan	Isov Hassan; Bulgaria	Paul Bartlett; United States
52 kg	Salim Bak; Turkey	Batsukh Bayarsaikhan; Mongolia	Tadashi Sasaki; Japan
56 kg	Onishi Toshinobu; Japan	A. Mardani; Iran	Ron Glass; United States
60 kg	V. Sokolov; Soviet Union	Yang Jung-mo; South Korea	Damdimsuren; Mongolia
65 kg	David Kvalelashvili; Soviet Union	Furistov; Bulgaria	Dennis Graham; United States
70 kg	Jabbar Mahdioun; Iran	Kabolov; Bulgaria	Hirohisa Yumisashi; Japan}
75 kg	Esmaeili Esmaeili; Iran	Ismail Abilov; Bulgaria	Alan Albright; United States
81 kg	A. Pramadian; Iran	Milev; Bulgaria	Ed Vatch; United States
87 kg	Salman Hashimikov; Soviet Union	Radev; Bulgaria	Tony Sidoti; United States
+87 kg	Mark Bittick; United States	Laurineki; Soviet Union	Uraimilov; Bulgaria

=== Men's Greco-Roman ===
Event	Gold	Silver	Bronze
48 kg	Kilas Akhmedov; Soviet Union	Masao Nakatani; Japan	Kerry Bolen; United States
52 kg	Oleg Davidyan; Soviet Union	Dan Mello; United States	Susumo Hagiwara; Japan
56 kg	Viktor Bekhtemirov; Soviet Union	Toshimitsu Ota; Japan	Per Lindholm; Sweden
60 kg	Berney Gonzales; United States	Yakubov; Soviet Union	Yang Jung-mo; South Korea
65 kg	Konstantin Trajkov; Bulgaria	Nelson Davidyan; United States	Ryoji Sugawara; Japan
70 kg	Anatoly Bykov; Soviet Union	Miltshev; Bulgaria	Masaru Ogasawara; Japan
75 kg	Alexander Onischenko; Soviet Union	Robin Richards; United States	Nedko Nedev; Bulgaria
81 kg	Tamas Kiknadse; Soviet Union	Lars-Erik Nilsson; Sweden	Dimitar Stefanov; Bulgaria
87 kg	Nikolai Lysenko; Soviet Union	Ivanov; Bulgaria	Sato Koji; Japan
+87 kg	Stefan Ognafov; Bulgaria	Aleksandr Kolchinsky; Soviet Union	Orlandi; Italy
