= U20 World Wrestling Championships =

International Junior Wrestling Competition

- Status: Active
- Genre: Sporting event
- Date: Mid-year
- Frequency: Annual
- Country: Varying
- Inaugurated: 1969
- Organiser: UWW

The U20 World Wrestling Championships is the main wrestling championships in the Junior age category (between 17 and 20 years old), organised by United World Wrestling (UWW). This event was held twice in 1979 and 1980.

== Rename ==
The past name for the competition was the Junior World Championships. In November 2021, the UWW renamed the Junior Worlds to U20 and Cadet Worlds to U17.

== Editions ==
- 1980 in Stockholm probably was in U15 (Schools) in 13 + 13 weights
- 1992 (LL, GR) and 1993 (LF) was counted one edition
- Not held in 2002 and 2004
- Shared bronze medal awarded since 2005
- 1983–1995: Espoir World Championships

#	Year	Host city	Host country	Events
Junior
Biannual
1	1969	Boulder	United States	20
2	1971	Tokyo	Japan	20
3	1973	Miami Beach / Unknown	United States (LL) / Unknown (GR)	20
4	1975	Haskovo / Unknown	Bulgaria (LL) / Unknown (GR)	20
Annual
5	1977	Las Vegas / Unknown	United States (LL) / Unknown (GR)	20
6	1978	Colorado Springs / Unknown	United States (LL) / Unknown (GR)	20
7	1979-1	Colorado Springs / Unknown	United States (LL) / Unknown (GR)	20
7	1979-2	Ulaanbaatar / Haparanda	Mongolia (LL) / Sweden (GR)	20
8	1980-1	Stockholm	Sweden	26
8	1980-2	Colorado Springs	United States	20
9	1981	Vancouver / Unknown	Canada / Unknown (GR)	20
10	1982	Colorado Springs	United States	20
11	1983	Oak Lawn	United States	20
12	1984	Washington	United States	20
1985 No Competition
Biannual
13	1986	Schifferstadt	Germany	20
14	1988	Wolfurt / Dijon	Austria (LL, GR) / France (LF)	29
Men - Women
15	1990	Istanbul / Unknown	Turkey (LL) / Unknown (GR)	20
15	1991	Barcelona	Spain (GR)	10
16	1992	Cali	Colombia (LL, GR)	20
16	1993	Götzis	Austria (LF)	8
End
17	1994	Budapest	Hungary	20
1995 No Competition
18	1996	Moscow / Wałbrzych	Russia (LL) / Poland (GR)	20
19	1997	Helsinki / Turku	Finland (LL) / Finland (GR)	20
20	1998	Las Vegas / Cairo / Fredrikstad	United States (LL) / Egypt (GR) / Norway (LF)	28
21	1999	Bucharest / Sydney	Romania (GR, LF) / Australia (LL)	26
22	2000	Nantes	France	26
23	2001	Tashkent / Martigny	Uzbekistan (LL, GR) / Switzerland (LF)	26
Unit Host
2002 No Competition
24	2003	Istanbul	Turkey	24
2004 No Competition
25	2005	Vilnius	Lithuania	24
26	2006	Guatemala City	Guatemala	24
27	2007	Beijing	China	24
28	2008	Istanbul	Turkey	24
29	2009	Ankara	Turkey	24
30	2010	Budapest	Hungary	24
31	2011	Bucharest	Romania	24
32	2012	Pattaya	Thailand	24
33	2013	Sofia	Bulgaria	24
34	2014	Zagreb	Croatia	24
35	2015	Salvador	Brazil	24
36	2016	Mâcon	France	24
37	2017	Tampere	Finland	24
38	2018	Trnava	Slovakia	30
39	2019	Tallinn	Estonia	30
2020 No Competition
40	2021	Ufa	Russia	30
U20
41	2022	Sofia	Bulgaria	30
42	2023	Amman	Jordan	30
43	2024	Pontevedra	Spain	30
44	2025	Samokov	Bulgaria	30
45	2026	Bratislava	Slovakia	30

- FS : Freestyle / GR : Greco-Roman / WW : Women's Freestyle

== All-time medal table ==
- Junior / U20 World Championship Medal Count (1969–1973, 2000–2026)

Rank	Nation	Gold	Silver	Bronze	Total
1	Russia	132	78	108	318
2	Japan	100	30	74	204
3	Iran	83	58	73	214
4	United States	57	61	107	225
5	Azerbaijan	41	39	76	156
6	Turkey	34	40	85	159
7	Soviet Union	28	14	6	48
8	Georgia	27	34	50	111
9	Ukraine	23	29	73	125
10	Bulgaria	15	30	29	74
11	Kazakhstan	14	30	48	92
12	China	14	17	35	66
13	India	12	29	57	98
14	Armenia	12	23	31	66
15	Uzbekistan	11	15	28	54
16	Kyrgyzstan	9	12	29	50
–	Individual Neutral Athletes	9	7	15	31
17	Sweden	8	8	25	41
18	Hungary	6	7	38	51
19	France	6	5	6	17
20	Canada	6	4	14	24
21	Germany	5	18	24	47
22	Belarus	5	11	23	39
23	Mongolia	5	10	23	38
24	Cuba	4	7	4	15
–	United World Wrestling	4	5	11	20
25	Romania	3	11	13	27
26	Moldova	3	9	15	27
27	Poland	1	7	20	28
28	South Korea	1	6	9	16
29	Lithuania	1	3	5	9
30	Egypt	1	2	7	10
30	Italy	1	2	7	10
32	Serbia	1	2	1	4
33	Latvia	1	1	3	5
34	Israel	1	1	1	3
35	Colombia	1	1	0	2
35	Netherlands	1	1	0	2
37	Finland	1	0	13	14
38	Turkmenistan	1	0	2	3
39	Norway	0	3	5	8
40	Austria	0	3	1	4
41	Vietnam	0	3	0	3
42	Greece	0	2	7	9
43	Venezuela	0	2	0	2
44	Mexico	0	1	4	5
45	Brazil	0	1	2	3
45	Ecuador	0	1	2	3
45	Switzerland	0	1	2	3
48	Chinese Taipei	0	1	1	2
48	Croatia	0	1	1	2
50	North Korea	0	1	0	1
50	Spain	0	1	0	1
52	West Germany	0	0	5	5
53	Tunisia	0	0	4	4
54	East Germany	0	0	3	3
54	Estonia	0	0	3	3
54	Slovakia	0	0	3	3
57	South Africa	0	0	2	2
58	Algeria	0	0	1	1
58	Bahrain	0	0	1	1
58	Czech Republic	0	0	1	1
58	Guatemala	0	0	1	1
58	Honduras	0	0	1	1
58	Puerto Rico	0	0	1	1
58	Sri Lanka	0	0	1	1
Totals (64 entries)		688	688	1,240	2,616

- Serbia consist of Serbia and Montenegro and Yugoslavia.
- was competed in 2023–2024.
- was competed in 2025.

== Team rankings ==
1969-2000: by medal ranking

2000-2025: by point ranking

Not awarded team trophy in medal ranking

Year	Men's Freestyle			Men's Greco-Roman			Women's Freestyle		
Year	1	2	3	1	2	3	1	2	3
1969	United States	Soviet Union	Japan	Soviet Union	Bulgaria	Sweden	No Competition		
1971	Iran	United States	Japan	Soviet Union	Bulgaria	United States	No Competition		
1973	Soviet Union	Bulgaria	Japan	Soviet Union	Romania	Bulgaria	No Competition		
1975	Soviet Union	Bulgaria	Romania	Soviet Union	Bulgaria	Sweden	No Competition		
1977	Soviet Union	United States	Bulgaria	Soviet Union	Bulgaria	Poland	No Competition		
1978	United States	Iran	Greece	United States	West Germany	Canada	No Competition		
1979-1	United States	West Germany	Japan	West Germany	United States	Netherlands	No Competition		
1979-2	Soviet Union	Bulgaria	Mongolia	Soviet Union	Bulgaria	Sweden	No Competition		
1980	United States	Japan	Mexico	West Germany	Yugoslavia	Sweden	No Competition		
1981	Soviet Union	Bulgaria	Japan	Soviet Union	Hungary	Bulgaria	No Competition		
1982	United States	Bulgaria	South Korea	Soviet Union	United States	West Germany	No Competition		
1983	Soviet Union	United States	South Korea	Soviet Union	West Germany	Turkey	No Competition		
1984	United States	West Germany	South Korea	South Korea	West Germany	China	No Competition		
1986	Soviet Union	Bulgaria	North Korea	Soviet Union	Cuba	Romania	No Competition		
1988	Soviet Union	Bulgaria	North Korea	Soviet Union	Bulgaria	South Korea	France	China	Norway
1990	Soviet Union	Iran	Bulgaria	Soviet Union	Bulgaria	Hungary	No Competition		
1991	No Competition			Soviet Union	Hungary	Turkey	No Competition		
1992	South Korea	Turkey	Bulgaria	Cuba	Turkey	Russia	No Competition		
1994	Russia	Iran	Turkey	Turkey	Russia	South Korea	No Competition		
1996	Cuba	Russia	Iran	Russia	Ukraine	Turkey	No Competition		
1997	Iran	Turkey	Russia	Russia	Turkey	Belarus	No Competition		
1998	Russia	United States	Iran	Russia	Turkey	Iran	Russia	Japan	Poland
1999	Russia	Iran	South Korea	Russia	Germany	Greece	Japan	Russia	Ukraine
2000	Russia	Iran	Kazakhstan	Ukraine	Russia	Kazakhstan	Japan	Germany	United States
2001	Russia	Georgia	Iran	Russia	Iran	Turkey	Japan	Russia	Germany
2003	Russia	Iran	Turkey	Turkey	Georgia	Russia	China	Russia	United States
2005	Russia	Iran	Bulgaria	Turkey	Iran	Uzbekistan	Japan	Ukraine	United States
2006	Russia	Iran	Turkey	Turkey	Russia	Hungary	Japan	Russia	Belarus
2007	Russia	Iran	Turkey	Russia	Iran	Turkey	China	Russia	United States
2008	Russia	Iran	Georgia	Turkey	Iran	Kyrgyzstan	Russia	Turkey	Japan
2009	Russia	Iran	Azerbaijan	Iran	Azerbaijan	Turkey	Russia	Ukraine	Japan
2010	Russia	Turkey	Georgia	Russia	Azerbaijan	Ukraine	Russia	China	Japan
2011	Russia	Georgia	Iran	Georgia	Russia	Armenia	Japan	Russia	United States
2012	Russia	Iran	Georgia	Azerbaijan	Russia	Turkey	Japan	China	Belarus
2013	Russia	Turkey	Iran	Russia	Armenia	Iran	Japan	Russia	Bulgaria
2014	Iran	United States	Russia	Azerbaijan	Georgia	Russia	Japan	Russia	Azerbaijan
2015	Iran	Azerbaijan	Russia	Georgia	Azerbaijan	Turkey	Japan	Azerbaijan	Russia
2016	Russia	Azerbaijan	Turkey	Georgia	Russia	Iran	Japan	China	Ukraine
2017	United States	Russia	Iran	Iran	Russia	Turkey	Japan	Russia	China
2018	Russia	United States	Iran	Iran	Russia	Armenia	Japan	Russia	China
2019	Russia	United States	Iran	Russia	Iran	Turkey	Japan	Russia	Ukraine
2021	Iran	Russia	United States	Russia	Iran	Azerbaijan	United States	Russia	India
2022	Iran	United States	India	Iran	Azerbaijan	Ukraine	Japan	India	United States
2023	Iran	United States	India	Iran	Georgia	Armenia	India	Japan	United States
2024	United States	Iran	Japan	Iran	Kazakhstan	Turkey	Japan	India	United States
2025	United States	Kazakhstan	Iran	Iran	Armenia	Azerbaijan	Japan	India	China
2026	United States	Russia	Japan	Russia	Iran	Uzbekistan	Japan	India	China

== Team titles ==
Country	Men's freestyle	Men's Greco-Roman	Women's freestyle	Total
Russia	18	11	4	33
Soviet Union	9	13	0	22
Japan	0	0	18	18
Iran	7	7	0	14
United States	10	1	1	12
Turkey	0	5	0	5
Georgia	0	3	0	3
Azerbaijan	0	2	0	2
China	0	0	2	2
Cuba	1	1	0	2
South Korea	1	1	0	2
West Germany	0	2	0	2
France	0	0	1	1
India	0	0	1	1
Ukraine	0	1	0	1
Total	46	47	27	120

== Espoir ==
#	Year	Host city	Host country	Events
Unit and Various Host
1	1983	Anaheim / Kristiansund	United States (LL) / Norway (GR)	20
2	1985	Colorado Springs	United States	20
3	1987	Burnaby	Canada	20
4	1989	Ulaanbaatar / Budapest	Mongolia (LL) / Hungary (GR)	20
5	1991	Unknown / Unknown	Unknown / Unknown	20
6	1993	Athens	Greece	20
7	1995	Tehran	Iran	20

- LL : Freestyle / GR : Greco-Roman
- After 1995 Junior and Espoir was merged.

== See also ==
- List of Cadet, Junior and U-23 World Champions in men's freestyle wrestling
- List of Cadet, Junior and U-23 World Champions in men's Greco-Roman wrestling
- World Wrestling Championships
