= Antim Panghal =

Indian freestyle wrestler (born 2004)

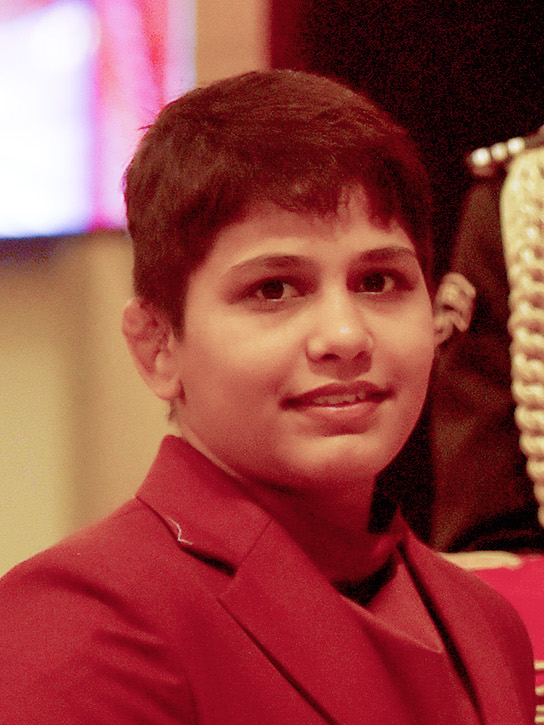
- Panghal in 2024

Personal information
- Born: 31 August 2004 (age 22) Bhagana, Haryana, India

Sport
- Sport: Wrestling
- Weight class: 53 kg
- Event: Freestyle

Achievements and titles
- World finals: (bronze) (2023, 2025)
- Regional finals: (silver) (2023, 2026); (bronze) (2022, 2025)
- Highest world ranking: 1 (2025)
Medal record
Women's freestyle wrestling
Representing India
World Championships
Bronze medal – third place	2023 Belgrade	53 kg
Bronze medal – third place	2025 Zagreb	53 kg
Asian Games
Silver medal – second place	2026 Aichi–Nagoya	53 kg
Bronze medal – third place	2022 Hangzhou	53 kg
Asian Championships
Silver medal – second place	2023 Astana	53 kg
Bronze medal – third place	2025 Amman	53 kg
Grand Prix
Gold medal – first place	2022 Tunisia	53 kg
Gold medal – first place	2025 Budapest	53 kg
Gold medal – first place	2025 Ulaanbaatar	53 kg
Silver medal – second place	2024 Budapest	53 kg
Bronze medal – third place	2026 Zagreb	53 kg
U23 Asian Championships
Silver medal – second place	2022 Bishkek	53 kg
U20 World Championships
Gold medal – first place	2022 Sofia	53 kg
Gold medal – first place	2023 Amman	53 kg
U20 Asian Championships
Gold medal – first place	2022 Manama	53 kg
U17 World Championships
Bronze medal – third place	2021 Budapest	53 kg

Antim Panghal (born 31 August 2004) is an Indian freestyle wrestler who competes in the 53 kg weight category. At age 17, she became India's first-ever U20 World Champion in 2022 and defended her title in 2023. Panghal is a two-time bronze medalist at the World Championships and also won a bronze medal at the 2022 Asian Games. At age 19, she represented India at the 2024 Paris Olympics, becoming India's youngest female Olympic wrestler.

== Early life ==
Antim Panghal was born in Bhagana village of Hisar district in Haryana. Her father's name is Ramniwas Panghal and mother's name is Krishna Kumari.

== Controversies ==
Panghal used her Olympics accreditation card to bring her sister inside the Olympic village. This occurred after a fight with a French taxi driver over the issue of an unpaid fare.

== Awards and nominations ==
=== National ===
- Arjuna Award (2023)

=== Others ===
Award	Year	Category	Result	Ref.
UWW Awards	2023	Women's Rising Star of the Year	Won	

== Senior career results ==
Res.	Record	Opponent	Score	Date	Event	Location
(silver) Silver Medal at 53 kg
Loss	16-4	Jonna Malmgren (SWE)	0-4	7 June 2024	2024 Polyák Imre & Varga János Memorial Tournament	(Hungary) Budapest
Win	16-3	Katarzyna Krawczyk (POL)	0-6, Fall	7 June 2024	2024 Polyák Imre & Varga János Memorial Tournament	(Hungary) Budapest
Win	15-3	Sakibjamal Esbosynova (UZB)	10-0	7 June 2024	2024 Polyák Imre & Varga János Memorial Tournament	(Hungary) Budapest
(bronze) Bronze Medal at 53 kg
Win	14-3	Bat-Ochiryn Bolortuyaa (MGL)	3-1	5 October 2023	2022 Asian Games	(China) Hangzhou
Loss	13-3	Akari Fujinami (JPN)	0-6, Fall	5 October 2023	2022 Asian Games	(China) Hangzhou
Win	13-2	Jasmina Immaeva (UZB)	11-0	5 October 2023	2022 Asian Games	(China) Hangzhou
(bronze) Bronze Medal at 53 kg
Win	12-2	Jonna Malmgren (SWE)	16-6	21 September 2023	2023 World Wrestling Championships	(Serbia) Belgrade
Loss	11-2	Vanesa Kaladzinskaya (BLR)	4-5	21 September 2023	2023 World Wrestling Championships	(Serbia) Belgrade
Win	11-1	Natalia Malysheva (RUS)	9-6	21 September 2023	2023 World Wrestling Championships	(Serbia) Belgrade
Win	10-1	Roksana Zasina (POL)	10-0	21 September 2023	2023 World Wrestling Championships	(Serbia) Belgrade
Win	9-1	Dominique Parrish (USA)	3-2	21 September 2023	2023 World Wrestling Championships	(Serbia) Belgrade
(silver) Silver Medal at 53 kg
Loss	8-1	Akari Fujinami (JPN)	0-10	12 April 2023	2023 Asian Wrestling Championships	Astana, Kazakhstan
Win	8-0	Aktenge Keunimjaeva (KAZ)	8-1, Fall	12 April 2023	2023 Asian Wrestling Championships	Astana, Kazakhstan
Win	7-0	Deng Li (CHN)	6-0	12 April 2023	2023 Asian Wrestling Championships	Astana, Kazakhstan
Win	6-0	Alvina Lim (SGP)	10-0, Fall	12 April 2023	2023 Asian Wrestling Championships	Astana, Kazakhstan
(gold) Gold Medal at 53 kg
Win	5-0	Karla Godinez (CAN)	4-2	16 July 2022	2022 Zouhaier Sghaier Ranking Series	(Tunisia) Tunis
Win	4-0	Esra Pul (TUR)	8-0, Fall	16 July 2022	2022 Zouhaier Sghaier Ranking Series	(Tunisia) Tunis
Win	3-0	Luisa Valverde (ECU)	4-2	16 July 2022	2022 Zouhaier Sghaier Ranking Series	(Tunisia) Tunis
Win	2-0	Dominique Parrish (USA)	11-0	16 July 2022	2022 Zouhaier Sghaier Ranking Series	(Tunisia) Tunis
Win	1-0	Nour Raouafi (MAR)	4-0, Fall	16 July 2022	2022 Zouhaier Sghaier Ranking Series	(Tunisia) Tunis
