= 2023 Grand Prix Zagreb Open – Women's freestyle =

The women's freestyle competitions at the 2023 Grand Prix Zagreb Open was held in Zagreb, Croatia between 2 and 4 February 2023.

== Women's freestyle ==
=== Women's freestyle 50 kg ===
2 February

Legend

- F — Won by fall
- WO — Won by walkover

Round of 32
	Score	
Zhu Jiang (CHN)	12–1	Patricia Bermúdez (ARG)
Fan Meng (CHN)	3–1	Anna Łukasiak (POL)
Gabija Dilytė (LTU)	0–6	Turkan Nasirova (AZE)

1/8 finals
Feng Ziqi (CHN)	4^{F}
Emma Luttenauer (FRA)	0
Zhu Jiang (CHN)	2
Madison Parks (CAN)	2
Emanuele Liuzzi (ITA)	2
Shivani Pawar (IND)	4
Szimonetta Szekér (HUN)	0
Erin Golston (USA)	10
Agata Walerzak (POL)	4
Jasmina Immaeva (UZB)	6^{F}
Fan Meng (CHN)	0
Yui Susaki (JPN)	8^{F}
Dolgorjavyn Otgonjargal (MGL)	10
Turkan Nasirova (AZE)	5
Mariya Stadnik (AZE)	10
Aktenge Keunimjaeva (UZB)	0

Quarterfinals
Feng Ziqi (CHN)	1
Zhu Jiang (CHN)	1
Shivani Pawar (IND)	0
Erin Golston (USA)	4
Jasmina Immaeva (UZB)	0
Yui Susaki (JPN)	10
Dolgorjavyn Otgonjargal (MGL)	2
Mariya Stadnik (AZE)	6

Semifinals
Zhu Jiang (CHN)	9
Erin Golston (USA)	0
Yui Susaki (JPN)	WO
Mariya Stadnik (AZE)

Final
Zhu Jiang (CHN)	1
Yui Susaki (JPN)	12

Repechage round 1
Patricia Bermúdez (ARG)	2
Madison Parks (CAN)	8

Repechage round 2
Madison Parks (CAN)	0
Feng Ziqi (CHN)	11
Fan Meng (CHN)	7
Jasmina Immaeva (UZB)	3

Bronze medals
Feng Ziqi (CHN)	12
Erin Golston (USA)	1
Fan Meng (CHN)	WO
Mariya Stadnik (AZE)

=== Women's freestyle 53 kg ===
4 February

Legend

- F — Won by fall

Round of 32
	Score	
Akari Fujinami (JPN)	10–0	Katarzyna Krawczyk (POL)
Deng Li (CHN)	5–5	Elnura Mammadova (AZE)
Sushma Shokeen (IND)	10–0	Tetiana Profatilova (FRA)
Dominique Parrish (USA)	0–6 Fall	Samantha Stewart (CAN)
Roksana Zasina (POL)	10–0	Marina Rueda (ESP)
Tatiana Debien (FRA)	1–6 Fall	Batkhuyagiin Khulan (MGL)
Bat-Ochiryn Bolortuyaa (MGL)	11–0	Alisha Howk (USA)
Shokhida Akhmedova (UZB)	0–2	Iulia Leorda (MDA)

Round of 16
Lucía Yépez (ECU)	0
Akari Fujinami (JPN)	10
Elnura Mammadova (AZE)	0
Karla Godinez (CAN)	4
Zhong Yuhong (CHN)	2
Sushma Shokeen (IND)	6
Samantha Stewart (CAN)	2^{F}
Dilshoda Matnazarova (UZB)	0
Diana Weicker (CAN)	2
Roksana Zasina (POL)	1
Batkhuyagiin Khulan (MGL)	6
Katie Gomez (USA)	2
Vivien Matyi (HUN)	2
Bat-Ochiryn Bolortuyaa (MGL)	12
Iulia Leorda (MDA)	4
Stalvira Orshush (HUN)	1

Quarterfinals
Akari Fujinami (JPN)	11
Karla Godinez (CAN)	0
Sushma Shokeen (IND)	2
Samantha Stewart (CAN)	2^{F}
Diana Weicker (CAN)	10^{F}
Batkhuyagiin Khulan (MGL)	2
Bat-Ochiryn Bolortuyaa (MGL)	3
Iulia Leorda (MDA)	3

Semifinals
Akari Fujinami (JPN)	10
Samantha Stewart (CAN)	0
Diana Weicker (CAN)	6
Bat-Ochiryn Bolortuyaa (MGL)	7^{F}

Final
Akari Fujinami (JPN)	10
Bat-Ochiryn Bolortuyaa (MGL)	0

Repechage round 1
Katarzyna Krawczyk (POL)	1
Lucía Yépez (ECU)	1
Alisha Howk (USA)	3^{F}
Vivien Matyi (HUN)	0

Repechage round 2
Lucía Yépez (ECU)	3
Karla Godinez (CAN)	3
Alisha Howk (USA)	1
Iulia Leorda (MDA)	2

Bronze medals
Karla Godinez (CAN)	1
Samantha Stewart (CAN)	6
Iulia Leorda (MDA)	10
Diana Weicker (CAN)	0

=== Women's freestyle 55 kg ===
2 February

Legend

- F — Won by fall

Pos	Athlete	Pld	W	L	CP	TP	JPN	MDA	HUN	USA	LTU
1	Moe Kiyooka (JPN)	4	4	0	16	43	—	12–2	11–0	10–0	10–0
2	Mariana Drăguțan (MDA)	4	3	1	14	15	1–4 VSU1	—	7–1	2–0 Fall	4–0 Fall
3	Erika Bognár (HUN)	4	2	2	8	15	0–4 VSU	1–3 VPO1	—	4–1	10–0
4	Lauren Mason (USA)	4	1	3	6	10	0–4 VSU	0–5 VFA	1–3 VPO1	—	9–2 Fall
5	Laura Stanelytė (LTU)	4	0	4	0	2	0–4 VSU	0–5 VFA	0–4 VSU	0–5 VFA	—

Source: UWW

=== Women's freestyle 57 kg ===
4 February

Legend

- F — Won by fall

Round of 32
	Score	
Tianna Kennett (CAN)	2–6 Fall	Alexandra Hedrick (USA)
Patrycja Gil (POL)	5–4	Rong Ningning (CHN)
Luisa Valverde (ECU)	0–10	Zhang Qi (CHN)

Round of 16
Anhelina Lysak (POL)	7
Feng Yongxin (CHN)	11
Alexandra Hedrick (USA)	0
Giullia Oliveira (BRA)	10
Aurora Russo (ITA)	9
Hannah Taylor (CAN)	3
Anna Szél (HUN)	1
Jowita Wrzesień (POL)	1
Laylokhon Sobirova (UZB)	2
Helen Maroulis (USA)	11
Patrycja Gil (POL)	9^{F}
Lana Nogić (CRO)	0
Amanda Martinez (USA)	0
Zhang Qi (CHN)	10
Alexandria Town (CAN)	0
Sae Nanjo (JPN)	10

Quarterfinals
Feng Yongxin (CHN)	7
Giullia Oliveira (BRA)	4
Aurora Russo (ITA)	0
Jowita Wrzesień (POL)	6
Helen Maroulis (USA)	5
Patrycja Gil (POL)	10
Zhang Qi (CHN)	0
Sae Nanjo (JPN)	5

Semifinals
Feng Yongxin (CHN)	11
Jowita Wrzesień (POL)	0
Patrycja Gil (POL)	0
Sae Nanjo (JPN)	10

Final
Feng Yongxin (CHN)	1
Sae Nanjo (JPN)	12

Repechage round 2
Anhelina Lysak (POL)	3
Giullia Oliveira (BRA)	11^{F}
Alexandria Town (CAN)	0
Zhang Qi (CHN)	10

Bronze medal match
Giullia Oliveira (BRA)	2
Jowita Wrzesień (POL)	3^{F}
Zhang Qi (CHN)	4
Patrycja Gil (POL)	2

=== Women's freestyle 59 kg ===
3 February

Legend

- F — Won by fall

Pos	Athlete	Pld	W	L	CP	TP	MDA	JPN	AZE	HUN	HUN
1	Anastasia Nichita (MDA)	4	4	0	15	38	—	7–0	11–0	10–0	10–0
2	Yui Sakano (JPN)	4	3	1	12	30	0–3 VPO	—	10–0	10–0	10–0
3	Alyona Kolesnik (AZE)	4	1	3	6	9	0–4 VSU	0–4 VSU	—	4–5	5–0 Fall
4	Nikolett Szabó (HUN)	4	1	3	4	11	0–4 VSU	0–4 VSU	3–1 VPO1	—	6–6
5	Viktória Borsos (HUN)	4	1	3	3	6	0–4 VSU	0–4 VSU	0–5 VFA	3–1 VPO1	—

Source: UWW

=== Women's freestyle 62 kg ===
3 February

Legend

- F — Won by fall

Round of 32
	Score	
Long Jia (CHN)	8–0	Zhuomalaga (CHN)
Enikő Elekes (HUN)	0–10	Grace Bullen (NOR)
Taybe Yusein (BUL)	4–0	Lydia Pérez (ESP)
Luo Xiaojuan (CHN)	10–4	Aisuluu Tynybekova (KGZ)
Lauren Louive (USA)	0–10	Sakura Motoki (JPN)
Améline Douarre (FRA)	1–8	Laís Nunes (BRA)
Ana Godinez (CAN)	6–5	Mimi Hristova (BUL)

Round of 16
Elis Manolova (AZE)	2
Kayla Miracle (USA)	5
Long Jia (CHN)	11
Elena Esposito (ITA)	0
Ariukhan Jumabaeva (UZB)	0
Grace Bullen (NOR)	4^{F}
Taybe Yusein (BUL)	10
Dilfuza Aimbetova (UZB)	0
Bilyana Dudova (BUL)	4
Luo Xiaojuan (CHN)	0
Sakura Motoki (JPN)	8^{F}
Viktoria Vesso (EST)	0
Magdalena Głodek (POL)	0
Laís Nunes (BRA)	10
Ana Godinez (CAN)	11
Natalia Kubaty (POL)	0

Quarterfinals
Kayla Miracle (USA)	6
Long Jia (CHN)	4
Grace Bullen (NOR)	11
Taybe Yusein (BUL)	0
Bilyana Dudova (BUL)	1
Sakura Motoki (JPN)	8
Laís Nunes (BRA)	2
Ana Godinez (CAN)	1

Semifinals
Kayla Miracle (USA)	6
Grace Bullen (NOR)	8
Sakura Motoki (JPN)	8^{F}
Laís Nunes (BRA)	1

Final
Grace Bullen (NOR)	0
Sakura Motoki (JPN)	7

Repechage round 1
Enikő Elekes (HUN)	7
Ariukhan Jumabaeva (UZB)	0
Lauren Louive (USA)	0
Viktoria Vesso (EST)	4^{F}

Repechage round 2
Enikő Elekes (HUN)	3
Taybe Yusein (BUL)	5
Viktoria Vesso (EST)	0
Bilyana Dudova (BUL)	5

Bronze medals
Taybe Yusein (BUL)	1
Kayla Miracle (USA)	11
Bilyana Dudova (BUL)	2
Laís Nunes (BRA)	1

=== Women's freestyle 65 kg ===
3 February

Legend

- WO — Won by walkover

Pos	Athlete	Pld	W	L	CP	TP	USA	JPN	USA
1	Mallory Velte (USA)	2	1	1	4	9	—	5–6	4–2
2	Mahiro Yoshitake (JPN)	2	1	1	4	7	3–1 VPO1	—	1–3
3	Emma Bruntil (USA)	2	1	1	4	5	1–3 VPO1	3–1 VPO1	—

Source: UWW

Pos	Athlete	Pld	W	L	CP	TP	IND	CRO	USA
1	Bhateri Lakhwan (IND)	2	2	0	8	9	—	1–1	WO
2	Iva Gerić (CRO)	2	1	1	5	0	1–3 VPO1	—	WO
—	Forrest Molinari (USA)	2	0	2	0	0	0–5 VFO	0–5 VFO	—

Source: UWW

Semifinals
Mallory Velte (USA)	10
Iva Gerić (CRO)	0
Bhateri Lakhwan (IND)	2
Mahiro Yoshitake (JPN)	13

Final
Mallory Velte (USA)	1
Mahiro Yoshitake (JPN)	2
Bronze medal
Iva Gerić (CRO)	3
Bhateri Lakhwan (IND)	1

=== Women's freestyle 68 kg ===
3 February

Legend

- F — Won by fall

Round of 16
Alexandria Glaudé (USA)	1
Solin Piearcy (USA)	1
Irina Rîngaci (MDA)	4^{F}
Olivia Di Bacco (CAN)	0
Radhika Jaglan (IND)	9^{F}
Noémi Szabados (HUN)	4
Danutė Domikaitytė (LTU)	12
Sofiya Georgieva (BUL)	1
Natalia Strzałka (POL)	0
Wiktoria Chołuj (POL)	2
Pauline Lecarpentier (FRA)	10
Marilyn Garcia (USA)	0

Quarterfinals
Koumba Larroque (FRA)	2
Solin Piearcy (USA)	1
Irina Rîngaci (MDA)	12^{F}
Radhika Jaglan (IND)	2
Danutė Domikaitytė (LTU)	5
Wiktoria Chołuj (POL)	5
Pauline Lecarpentier (FRA)	0
Adéla Hanzlíčková (CZE)	5

Semifinals
Koumba Larroque (FRA)	7
Irina Rîngaci (MDA)	3
Wiktoria Chołuj (POL)	0
Adéla Hanzlíčková (CZE)	2^{F}

Final
Koumba Larroque (FRA)	5
Adéla Hanzlíčková (CZE)	0

Bronze medal match
Solin Piearcy (USA)	0
Irina Rîngaci (MDA)	6
Pauline Lecarpentier (FRA)	3
Wiktoria Chołuj (POL)	2

=== Women's freestyle 72 kg ===
4 February

Legend

- F — Won by fall

Pos	Athlete	Pld	W	L	CP	TP	USA	JPN	IND
1	Skylar Grote (USA)	2	2	0	6	14	—	10–1	4–0
2	Sumire Niikura (JPN)	2	1	1	4	5	1–3 VPO1	—	4–4
3	Reetika Hooda (IND)	2	0	2	1	4	0–3 VPO	1–3 VPO1	—

Source: UWW

Pos	Athlete	Pld	W	L	CP	TP	ITA	CRO	UZB
1	Dalma Caneva (ITA)	2	2	0	8	22	—	12–0	10–0
2	Milla Anđelić (CRO)	2	1	1	3	9	0–4 VSU	—	9–8
3	Svetlana Oknazarova (UZB)	2	0	2	1	8	0–4 VSU	1–3 VPO1	—

Source: UWW

Semifinals
Skylar Grote (USA)	4^{F}
Milla Anđelić (CRO)	0
Dalma Caneva (ITA)	4
Sumire Niikura (JPN)	2

Final
Skylar Grote (USA)	3
Dalma Caneva (ITA)	1
Bronze medal
Milla Anđelić (CRO)	7
Sumire Niikura (JPN)	18

=== Women's freestyle 76 kg ===
4 February

Legend

- F — Won by fall
- WO — Won by walkover

Round of 32
	Score	
Génesis Reasco (ECU)	2–8	Ayano Moro (JPN)

Round of 16
Cynthia Vescan (FRA)	1
Enrica Rinaldi (ITA)	5^{F}
Ayano Moro (JPN)	1
Wang Juan (CHN)	2
Justina Di Stasio (CAN)	4
Samar Amer (EGY)	2
Kiran Bishnoi (IND)	0
Aiperi Medet Kyzy (KGZ)	5^{F}
Shauna Kuebeck (CAN)	0
Yelena Makoyed (USA)	11
~~Veronika Nyikos (HUN)~~
Precious Bell (USA)	WO
Ozoda Zaripboeva (UZB)	0
Kamilė Gaučaitė (LTU)	3
Dymond Guilford (USA)	5^{F}
Taylor Follensbee (CAN)	0

Quarterfinals
Enrica Rinaldi (ITA)	1
Wang Juan (CHN)	5
Justina Di Stasio (CAN)	0
Aiperi Medet Kyzy (KGZ)	5^{F}
Yelena Makoyed (USA)	12
Precious Bell (USA)	2
Kamilė Gaučaitė (LTU)	0
Dymond Guilford (USA)	10

Semifinals
Wang Juan (CHN)	1
Aiperi Medet Kyzy (KGZ)	6^{F}
Yelena Makoyed (USA)	12
Dymond Guilford (USA)	2

Final
Aiperi Medet Kyzy (KGZ)	2
Yelena Makoyed (USA)	4^{F}

Repechage round 2
Kiran Bishnoi (IND)	0
Justina Di Stasio (CAN)	6
Shauna Kuebeck (CAN)	0
Precious Bell (USA)	10

Bronze medal match
Justina Di Stasio (CAN)	6
Wang Juan (CHN)	3
Precious Bell (USA)	0
Dymond Guilford (USA)	13

== See also ==
- 2023 Grand Prix Zagreb Open
