= 2023 World Wrestling Championships – Women's freestyle 53 kg =

Wrestling competitions

Women's freestyle 53 kg at the 2023 World Championships
- Venue: Štark Arena
- Dates: 20–21 September 2023
- Competitors: 31 from 28 nations

Medalists
gold medal	Akari Fujinami	Japan
silver medal	Vanesa Kaladzinskaya
bronze medal	Lucía Yépez	Ecuador
bronze medal	Antim Panghal

The women's freestyle 53 kg is a competition featured at the 2023 World Wrestling Championships, and was held in Belgrade, Serbia on 20 and 21 September 2023.

This freestyle wrestling competition consists of a single-elimination tournament, with a repechage used to determine the winners of two bronze medals. The two finalists face off for gold and silver medals. Each wrestler who loses to one of the two finalists moves into the repechage, culminating in a pair of bronze medal matches featuring the semifinal losers each facing the remaining repechage opponent from their half of the bracket.

== Results ==
Legend

- F — Won by fall
- WO — Won by walkover

=== Final ===
Final
Akari Fujinami (JPN)	10
Vanesa Kaladzinskaya (AIN)	0

=== Top half ===
Round of 32
Lilya Horishna (UKR)	1
Christianah Ogunsanya (NGR)	4
Mia-Lahnee Aquino (GUM)	12
Oh Jeong-bin (KOR)	12
Tuba Demir (TUR)	0
Akari Fujinami (JPN)	10
Iulia Leorda (MDA)	4^{F}
Sandy Parra (COL)	1
Andreea Ana (ROU)	9
Elnura Mammadova (AZE)	1
Altyn Shagayeva (KAZ)	1
Pang Qianyu (CHN)	2
Aktenge Keunimjaeva (UZB)	1
Maria Prevolaraki (GRE)	2

Round of 16
Lucía Yépez (ECU)	6^{F}
Christianah Ogunsanya (NGR)	0
Oh Jeong-bin (KOR)	0
Akari Fujinami (JPN)	10
Iulia Leorda (MDA)	0
Andreea Ana (ROU)	9
Pang Qianyu (CHN)	4
Maria Prevolaraki (GRE)	8

Quarterfinals
Lucía Yépez (ECU)	7
Akari Fujinami (JPN)	16^{F}
Andreea Ana (ROU)	1
Maria Prevolaraki (GRE)	1

Semifinals
Akari Fujinami (JPN)	10
Maria Prevolaraki (GRE)	0

=== Bottom half ===
Round of 32
Jonna Malmgren (SWE)	6
Ganbaataryn Otgonjargal (MGL)	3
Samantha Stewart (CAN)	2^{F}
Betzabeth Argüello (VEN)	2
Vanesa Kaladzinskaya (AIN)	WO
~~Tatiana Debien (FRA)~~
Vestina Danisevičiūtė (LTU)	0
Sztalvira Orsós (HUN)	10
Karla Acosta (MEX)	16
Annika Wendle (GER)	10
Natalia Malysheva (AIN)	16
Nethmi Ahinsa (SRI)	5
Nogona Bakayoko (CIV)	1
Roksana Zasina (POL)	3
Antim Panghal (UWW)	3
Dominique Parrish (USA)	2

Round of 16
Jonna Malmgren (SWE)	2
Samantha Stewart (CAN)	1
Vanesa Kaladzinskaya (AIN)	9
Sztalvira Orsós (HUN)	2
Karla Acosta (MEX)	0
Natalia Malysheva (AIN)	10
Roksana Zasina (POL)	0
Antim Panghal (UWW)	10

Quarterfinals
Jonna Malmgren (SWE)	4
Vanesa Kaladzinskaya (AIN)	9
Natalia Malysheva (AIN)	6
Antim Panghal (UWW)	9

Semifinals
Vanesa Kaladzinskaya (AIN)	5
Antim Panghal (UWW)	4

=== Repechage ===
Repechage round 1
Tuba Demir (TUR)	11
Oh Jeong-bin (KOR)	0
~~Tatiana Debien (FRA)~~
Sztalvira Orsós (HUN)	WO

Repechage round 2
Tuba Demir (TUR)	0
Lucía Yépez (ECU)	8^{F}
Sztalvira Orsós (HUN)	2
Jonna Malmgren (SWE)	4^{F}

Bronze medals
Lucía Yépez (ECU)	10
Maria Prevolaraki (GRE)	3
Jonna Malmgren (SWE)	6
Antim Panghal (UWW)	16

Olympic wrestle-off
Maria Prevolaraki (GRE)	0
Jonna Malmgren (SWE)	2^{F}

== Final standing ==
Rank	Athlete
1st place, gold medalist(s)	Akari Fujinami (JPN)
2nd place, silver medalist(s)	Vanesa Kaladzinskaya (AIN)
3rd place, bronze medalist(s)	Lucía Yépez (ECU)
3rd place, bronze medalist(s)	Antim Panghal (UWW)
5	Jonna Malmgren (SWE)
5	Maria Prevolaraki (GRE)
7	Sztalvira Orsós (HUN)
8	Natalia Malysheva (AIN)
9	Andreea Ana (ROU)
10	Samantha Stewart (CAN)
11	Iulia Leorda (MDA)
12	Tuba Demir (TUR)
13	Pang Qianyu (CHN)
14	Karla Acosta (MEX)
15	Oh Jeong-bin (KOR)
16	Christianah Ogunsanya (NGR)
17	Roksana Zasina (POL)
18	Mia-Lahnee Aquino (GUM)
19	Annika Wendle (GER)
20	Nethmi Ahinsa (SRI)
21	Ganbaataryn Otgonjargal (MGL)
22	Dominique Parrish (USA)
23	Altyn Shagayeva (KAZ)
24	Aktenge Keunimjaeva (UZB)
25	Nogona Bakayoko (CIV)
26	Lilya Horishna (UKR)
27	Elnura Mammadova (AZE)
28	Betzabeth Argüello (VEN)
29	Sandy Parra (COL)
30	Vestina Danisevičiūtė (LTU)
—	Tatiana Debien (FRA)

Qualified for the 2024 Summer Olympics
