= 2019 World Wrestling Championships – Women's freestyle 53 kg =

World Wrestling Championship 2019

Women's freestyle 53 kg at the 2019 World Championships
- Venue: Barys Arena
- Dates: 17–18 September 2019
- Competitors: 30 from 30 nations

Medalists
gold medal	Pak Yong-mi	North Korea
silver medal	Mayu Mukaida	Japan
bronze medal	Vinesh Phogat	India
bronze medal	Pang Qianyu	China

The women's freestyle 53 kilograms is a competition featured at the 2019 World Wrestling Championships, and was held in Nur-Sultan, Kazakhstan on 17 and 18 September.

This freestyle wrestling competition consists of a single-elimination tournament, with a repechage used to determine the winner of two bronze medals. The two finalists face off for gold and silver medals. Each wrestler who loses to one of the two finalists moves into the repechage, culminating in a pair of bronze medal matches featuring the semifinal losers each facing the remaining repechage opponent from their half of the bracket.

== Results ==
Legend

- F — Won by fall
- WO — Won by walkover

=== Final ===
Final
Mayu Mukaida (JPN)	1
Pak Yong-mi (PRK)	12

=== Top half ===
Round of 32
~~Betzabeth Argüello (VEN)~~
Bùi Thị Đào (VIE)	WO
Vinesh Phogat (IND)	13
Sofia Mattsson (SWE)	0
Yuliya Khavaldzhy (UKR)	1
Mayu Mukaida (JPN)	6
Maria Prevolaraki (GRE)	5
Jessica Blaszka (NED)	0
Erdenechimegiin Sumiyaa (MGL)	14
Joseph Essombe (CMR)	2
Rckaela Aquino (GUM)	2
Stalvira Orshush (RUS)	13
Evelina Nikolova (BUL)	1
Luisa Valverde (ECU)	12

Round of 16
Sarah Hildebrandt (USA)	10
Bùi Thị Đào (VIE)	0
Vinesh Phogat (IND)	0
Mayu Mukaida (JPN)	7
Maria Prevolaraki (GRE)	5
Erdenechimegiin Sumiyaa (MGL)	2
Stalvira Orshush (RUS)	3
Luisa Valverde (ECU)	4

Quarterfinals
Sarah Hildebrandt (USA)	1
Mayu Mukaida (JPN)	12
Maria Prevolaraki (GRE)	5
Luisa Valverde (ECU)	1

Semifinals
Mayu Mukaida (JPN)	4
Maria Prevolaraki (GRE)	0

=== Bottom half ===
Round of 32
Diana Weicker (CAN)	3
Roksana Zasina (POL)	4
Pak Yong-mi (PRK)	10
Iulia Leorda (MDA)	0
Zeynep Yetgil (TUR)	4
Silje Kippernes (NOR)	1
Aktenge Keunimjaeva (UZB)	0
Lianna Montero (CUB)	3
Mercédesz Dénes (HUN)	6
Kim Hyung-joo (KOR)	1
Tatyana Akhmetova-Amanzhol (KAZ)	6
Vanesa Kaladzinskaya (BLR)	7
Nina Hemmer (GER)	11
Turkan Nasirova (AZE)	0

Round of 16
Roksana Zasina (POL)	0
Pak Yong-mi (PRK)	10
Zeynep Yetgil (TUR)	7
Lianna Montero (CUB)	8
Mercédesz Dénes (HUN)	2
Vanesa Kaladzinskaya (BLR)	6
Nina Hemmer (GER)	0
Pang Qianyu (CHN)	10

Quarterfinals
Pak Yong-mi (PRK)	6^{F}
Lianna Montero (CUB)	0
Vanesa Kaladzinskaya (BLR)	0
Pang Qianyu (CHN)	10^{F}

Semifinals
Pak Yong-mi (PRK)	12
Pang Qianyu (CHN)	2

=== Repechage ===
Repechage round 1
Yuliya Khavaldzhy (UKR)	0
Vinesh Phogat (IND)	5
Iulia Leorda (MDA)	0
Roksana Zasina (POL)	7

Repechage round 2
Vinesh Phogat (IND)	8
Sarah Hildebrandt (USA)	2
Roksana Zasina (POL)	3
Lianna Montero (CUB)	1

Bronze medals
Vinesh Phogat (IND)	4^{F}
Maria Prevolaraki (GRE)	1
Roksana Zasina (POL)
Pang Qianyu (CHN)	WO
