= Wrestling at the 2022 Asian Games – Women's freestyle 53 kg =

Women's freestyle 53 kg at the 2022 Asian Games
- Venue: Lin'an Sports and Culture Centre
- Date: 5 October 2023
- Competitors: 14 from 14 nations

Medalists
gold medal	Akari Fujinami	Japan
silver medal	Pang Qianyu	China
bronze medal	Antim Panghal	India
bronze medal	Choe Hyo-gyong	North Korea

The women's freestyle 53 kilograms wrestling competition at the 2022 Asian Games in Hangzhou was held on 5 October 2023 at the Lin'an Sports and Culture Centre.

This freestyle wrestling competition consists of a single-elimination tournament, with a repechage used to determine the winner of two bronze medals. The two finalists face off for gold and silver medals. Each wrestler who loses to one of the two finalists moves into the repechage, culminating in a pair of bronze medal matches featuring the semifinal losers each facing the remaining repechage opponent from their half of the bracket.

== Schedule ==
All times are China Standard Time (UTC+08:00)

Date	Time	Event
Thursday, 5 October 2023	10:00	1/8 finals
Thursday, 5 October 2023	10:00	1/4 finals
Thursday, 5 October 2023	10:00	Semifinals
Thursday, 5 October 2023	10:00	Repechages
Thursday, 5 October 2023	17:00	Finals

== Results ==
Legend

- F — Won by fall

=== Main bracket ===
1/8 finals
Jasmina Immaeva (UZB)	0
Antim Panghal (IND)	11
Hsieh Meng-hsuan (TPE)	6
Vatansulton Shakarshoeva (TJK)	0
Candra Marimar (INA)	1
Bat-Ochiryn Bolortuyaa (MGL)	14
Nguyễn Thị Mỹ Trang (VIE)	0
Pang Qianyu (CHN)	8
Nethmi Ahinsa (SRI)	4
Marina Sedneva (KAZ)	5^{F}
Choe Hyo-gyong (PRK)	6^{F}
Oh Hyun-young (KOR)	0

1/4 finals
Akari Fujinami (JPN)	6^{F}
Antim Panghal (IND)	0
Hsieh Meng-hsuan (TPE)	0
Bat-Ochiryn Bolortuyaa (MGL)	10
Pang Qianyu (CHN)	12
Marina Sedneva (KAZ)	6
Choe Hyo-gyong (PRK)	10
Sambat Vannak (CAM)	0

Semifinals
Akari Fujinami (JPN)	10
Bat-Ochiryn Bolortuyaa (MGL)	0
Pang Qianyu (CHN)	8
Choe Hyo-gyong (PRK)	6

Gold medal match
Akari Fujinami (JPN)	10
Pang Qianyu (CHN)	0

=== Repechage ===
Repechage round 1
Nguyễn Thị Mỹ Trang (VIE)	6
Marina Sedneva (KAZ)	4

Bronze medal matches
Antim Panghal (IND)	3
Bat-Ochiryn Bolortuyaa (MGL)	1
Nguyễn Thị Mỹ Trang (VIE)	0
Choe Hyo-gyong (PRK)	11

== Final standing ==
Rank	Athlete
1st place, gold medalist(s)	Akari Fujinami (JPN)
2nd place, silver medalist(s)	Pang Qianyu (CHN)
3rd place, bronze medalist(s)	Antim Panghal (IND)
3rd place, bronze medalist(s)	Choe Hyo-gyong (PRK)
5	Bat-Ochiryn Bolortuyaa (MGL)
5	Nguyễn Thị Mỹ Trang (VIE)
7	Marina Sedneva (KAZ)
8	Hsieh Meng-hsuan (TPE)
9	Candra Marimar (INA)
10	Nethmi Ahinsa (SRI)
11	Vatansulton Shakarshoev (TJK)
12	Oh Hyun-young (KOR)
13	Sambat Vannak (CAM)
14	Jasmina Immaeva (UZB)
