= 2022 Tunis Ranking Series =

- Host city: Tunis, Tunisia
- Dates: 14-17 July 2022
- Stadium: Salle Omnisport de Radès

Champions
- Freestyle: India
- Greco-Roman: Turkey
- Women: India

The 2022 Tunis Ranking Series, also known as the 2022 Zouhaier Sghaier Ranking Series, was a wrestling event held in Tunis, Tunisia between 14 and 17 July 2022. It was held as the fourth of the ranking series of United World Wrestling.

== Ranking Series ==
Ranking Series Calendar 2022:

- 1st Ranking Series: 24-27 February, Turkey, Istanbul ⇒ 2022 Yasar Dogu Tournament
  2022 Vehbi Emre & Hamit Kaplan Tournament
- 2nd Ranking Series: 2-5 June, Kazakhstan, Almaty ⇒ 2022 Bolat Turlykhanov Cup
- 3rd Ranking Series: 22-25 June, Italy, Rome ⇒ Matteo Pellicone Ranking Series 2022
- 4th Ranking Series: 14-17 July, Tunisia, Tunis ⇒ 2022 Tunis Ranking Series

== Competition schedule ==
All times are (UTC+1)

Date	Time	Event
14 July	10.30-14.30	Qualification rounds & repechage GR – 55-60-63-67-87-97-130 kg
14 July	18.00-20.30	Final matches and awarding ceremony: GR – 55-60-63-67-87-97-130 kg
15 July	10.30-14.30	Qualification rounds & repechage GR – 72-77-82kg & WW – 57-62-68-76 kg
15 July	18.00-20.30	Final matches and awarding ceremony: Finals GR – 72-77-82 kg & WW – 57-62-68-76 kg
16 July	10.30-14.30	Qualification rounds & repechage WW – 50-53-55-59-65-72 kg & FS – 97-125 kg
16 July	18.00-20.30	Final matches and awarding ceremony: Finals WW – 50-53-55-59-65-72 kg & FS – 97-125 kg
17 July	10.30-14.30	Qualification rounds & repechage FS – 57-61-65-70-74-79-86-92 kg
17 July	18.00-20.30	Final matches and awarding ceremony: Finals FS – 57-61-65-70-74-79-86-92 kg

== Medal table ==
Rank	Nation	Gold	Silver	Bronze	Total
1	United States	7	5	2	14
2	India	6	10	7	23
3	Turkey	6	3	4	13
4	Kazakhstan	2	3	2	7
5	Germany	2	1	1	4
6	Iran	2	0	1	3
7	Tunisia	1	4	5	10
8	Brazil	1	2	3	6
9	Bulgaria	1	0	0	1
9	Georgia	1	0	0	1
11	Canada	0	1	0	1
12	Algeria	0	0	2	2
13	Argentina	0	0	1	1
13	Egypt	0	0	1	1
Totals (14 entries)		29	29	29	87

== Team ranking ==
Rank	Men's freestyle		Men's Greco-Roman		Women's freestyle	
Rank	Team	Points	Team	Points	Team	Points
1	India	157	Turkey	160	India	145
2	United States	155	India	150	United States	134
3	Kazakhstan	152	Tunisia	135	Germany	107
4	Iran	65	Brazil	35	Tunisia	105
5	Turkey	59	Algeria	30	Turkey	79

== Medal overview ==
=== Men's freestyle ===
Event	Gold	Silver	Bronze
57 kg	Thomas Gilman; United States	Udit Kumar; India	Alireza Sarlak; Iran
61 kg	Seth Gross; United States	Aman Sehrawat; India	Süleyman Atlı; Turkey
65 kg	Sujeet Kalkal; India	Yianni Diakomihalis; United States	Adlan Askarov; Kazakhstan
70 kg	Zain Retherford; United States	Syrbaz Talgat; Kazakhstan	Karan Mor; India
74 kg	Yones Emami Choghaei; Iran	Sagar Jaglan; India	César Alvan; Brazil
79 kg	Mohammad Nokhodi; Iran	Bolat Sakayev; Kazakhstan	Chance Marsteller; United States
86 kg	Azamat Dauletbekov; Kazakhstan	Osman Göçen; Turkey	Sabri Mnasria; Tunisia
92 kg	Abdimanap Baigenzheyev; Kazakhstan	Vicky Chahar; India	Imed Kaddidi; Tunisia
97 kg	Kyle Snyder; United States	Mamed Ibragimov; Kazakhstan	Burak Şahin; Turkey
97 kg	Kyle Snyder; United States	Mamed Ibragimov; Kazakhstan	Deepak Nehra; India
125 kg	Geno Petriashvili; Georgia	Hayden Zillmer; United States	Alisher Yergali; Kazakhstan

=== Men's Greco-Roman ===
Event	Gold	Silver	Bronze
55 kg	no competitors		
60 kg	Ayhan Karakuş; Turkey	Arjun Halakurki; India	Abdelkarim Fergat; Algeria
63 kg	Gyanender Dahiya; India	Oussama Nasr; Tunisia	Not awarded as there were only 2 competitors.
67 kg	Sachin Sahrawat; India	Neeraj Chhikara; India	Volkan Çakıl; Turkey
72 kg	Murat Dağ; Turkey	Kenedy Pedrosa; Brazil	Radhwen Tarhouni; Tunisia
77 kg	Aik Mnatsakanian; Bulgaria	Furkan Bayrak; Turkey	Joílson Júnior; Brazil
82 kg	Emrah Kuş; Turkey	Singh Harpreet Sandhu; India	Sajan Bhanwal; India
87 kg	Sunil Kumar; India	Skander Missaoui; Tunisia	Not awarded as there were only 2 competitors.
97 kg	Muhittin Sarıçiçek; Turkey	Deepanshu Ahlawat; India	Adem Boudjemline; Algeria
130 kg	Hamza Bakır; Turkey	Amine Guennichi; Tunisia	Naveen Sevlia; India

=== Women's freestyle ===
Event	Gold	Silver	Bronze
50 kg	Sarah Hildebrandt; United States	Emily Shilson; United States	Patricia Bermúdez; Argentina
50 kg	Sarah Hildebrandt; United States	Emily Shilson; United States	Lisa Ersel; Germany
53 kg	Antim Panghal; India	Karla Godinez; Canada	Esra Pul; Turkey
55 kg	Nina Hemmer; Germany	Lobna Ichaoui; Tunisia	Not awarded as there were only 2 competitors.
57 kg	Giullia Oliveira; Brazil	Elvira Kamaloğlu; Turkey	Mansi Ahlawat; India
59 kg	Sarita Mor; India	Elena Brugger; Germany	Siwar Bousetta; Tunisia
62 kg	Luisa Niemesch; Germany	Laís Nunes; Brazil	Sakshi Malik; India
65 kg	Khadija Jlassi; Tunisia	Emma Bruntil; United States	Manisha Bhanwala; India
68 kg	Tamyra Mensah-Stock; United States	Nisha Dahiya; India	Gabriela Rocha; Brazil
72 kg	Buse Tosun; Turkey	Bipasha Dahiya; India	Zaineb Sghaier; Tunisia
72 kg	Buse Tosun; Turkey	Bipasha Dahiya; India	Skylar Grote; United States
76 kg	Yelena Makoyed; United States	Dymond Guilford; United States	Samar Amer; Egypt

== Participating nations ==
136 wrestlers from 17 countries:

1. Algeria (3)
2. Argentina (2)
3. Brazil (7)
4. Bulgaria (1)
5. Canada (3)
6. Ecuador (1)
7. Egypt (1)
8. Georgia (1)
9. Germany (7)
10. Greece (1)
11. India (27)
12. Iran (5)
13. Kazakhstan (11)
14. Tunisia (26) (Host)
15. Turkey (19)
16. United States (20)
17. Uzbekistan (1)

== Results ==
=== Men's freestyle ===
==== Men's freestyle 57 kg ====
Legend

- F — Won by fall
- WO — Won by walkover

Pos	Athlete	Pld	W	L	CP	TP	IRI	IND	IRI
1	Alireza Sarlak (IRI)	2	2	0	6	6	—	4–1	2–0
2	Udit Kumar (IND)	2	1	1	4	12	1–3 VPO1	—	11–6
3	Ahmad Javan (IRI)	2	0	2	1	6	0–3 VPO	1–3 VPO1	—

Source: UWW

Pos	Athlete	Pld	W	L	CP	TP	GER	USA	UZB
1	Horst Lehr (GER)	2	2	0	8	15	—	4–1 Fall	11–3
2	Thomas Gilman (USA)	2	1	1	4	12	0–5 VFA	—	11–1
3	Nodirjon Safarov (UZB)	2	0	2	2	4	1–3 VPO1	1–4 VSU1	—

Source: UWW

Semifinals
Alireza Sarlak (IRI)	7
Thomas Gilman (USA)	11
Horst Lehr (GER)	4
Udit Kumar (IND)	14

Final
Thomas Gilman (USA)	9
Udit Kumar (IND)	8
Bronze medal
Alireza Sarlak (IRI)	WO
Horst Lehr (GER)

==== Men's freestyle 61 kg ====
Legend

- F — Won by fall
- R — Retired
- WO — Won by walkover

Pos	Athlete	Pld	W	L	CP	TP	USA	IND	TUR	KAZ	TUR
1	Seth Gross (USA)	4	4	0	16	41	—	11–2	16–5	14–3	WO
2	Aman Sehrawat (IND)	4	3	1	13	25	1–3 VPO1	—	12–2	15–2	11–4
3	Süleyman Atlı (TUR)	4	2	2	11	24	1–4 VSU1	1–4 VSU1	—	15–2	2–4 Ret
4	Assylzhan Yessengeldi (KAZ)	4	0	4	2	5	1–4 VSU1	1–4 VSU1	1–4 VSU1	—	
5	Nebi Uzun (TUR)	4	0	4	1	8	0–5 VIN	1–3 VPO1	0–5 VIN	0–0 2VIN	—

Source: UWW

==== Men's freestyle 65 kg ====
Legend

- F — Won by fall

Pos	Athlete	Pld	W	L	CP	TP	IND	USA	KAZ	ARG
1	Sujeet Kalkal (IND)	3	3	0	11	37	—	8–2	14–4	15–4
2	Yianni Diakomihalis (USA)	3	2	1	8	26	1–3 VPO1	—	15–5	15–4
3	Adlan Askarov (KAZ)	3	1	2	5	11	1–4 VSU1	1–4 VSU1	—	2–2
4	Agustín Destribats (ARG)	3	0	3	3	8	1–4 VSU1	1–4 VSU1	1–3 VPO1	—

Source: UWW

==== Men's freestyle 70 kg ====
Legend

- F — Won by fall
- WO — Won by walkover

Pos	Athlete	Pld	W	L	CP	TP	USA	IND	KAZ	TUR
1	Zain Retherford (USA)	3	3	0	15	12	—	6–0 Fall	6–0 Fall	WO
2	Karan Mor (IND)	3	2	1	6	19	0–5 VFA	—	12–4	7–5
3	Sanzhar Doszhanov (KAZ)	3	1	2	6	4	0–5 VFA	1–3 VPO1	—	WO
4	Haydar Yavuz (TUR)	3	0	3	1	5	0–5 VIN	1–3 VPO1	0–5 VIN	—

Source: UWW

Pos	Athlete	Pld	W	L	CP	TP	KAZ	TUN	TUN
1	Syrbaz Talgat (KAZ)	2	2	0	8	21	—	11–0	10–0
2	Kossai Ajimi (TUN)	2	1	1	4	10	0–4 VSU	—	10–0
3	Mohamed Ali Zorgui (TUN)	2	0	2	0	0	0–4 VSU	0–4 VSU	—

Source: UWW

Semifinals
Zain Retherford (USA)	11
Kossai Ajimi (TUN)	0
Syrbaz Talgat (KAZ)	10
Karan Mor (IND)	0

Final
Zain Retherford (USA)	10
Syrbaz Talgat (KAZ)	0
Bronze medal
Kossai Ajimi (TUN)	0
Karan Mor (IND)	10

==== Men's freestyle 74 kg ====
Legend

- F — Won by fall

Pos	Athlete	Pld	W	L	CP	TP	IRI	IND	BRA
1	Younes Emami (IRI)	2	2	0	8	21	—	11–0	10–0
2	Sagar Jaglan (IND)	2	1	1	5	15	0–4 VSU	—	15–4 Fall
3	César Alvan (BRA)	2	0	2	0	4	0–4 VSU	0–5 VFA	—

Source: UWW

==== Men's freestyle 79 kg ====
Legend

- F — Won by fall

Pos	Athlete	Pld	W	L	CP	TP	IRI	USA	IRI	GRE
1	Mohammad Nokhodi (IRI)	3	2	1	8	22	—	10–0	5–5	7–3
2	Chance Marsteller (USA)	3	2	1	7	20	0–4 VSU	—	9–6	11–0
3	Ali Savadkouhi (IRI)	3	2	1	7	14	3–1 VPO1	1–3 VPO1	—	3–1
4	Georgios Kougioumtsidis (GRE)	3	0	3	2	4	1–3 VPO1	0–4 VSU	1–3 VPO1	—

Source: UWW

Pos	Athlete	Pld	W	L	CP	TP	KAZ	IND	ALG
1	Bolat Sakayev (KAZ)	2	2	0	8	22	—	10–0	12–0
2	Gourav Baliyan (IND)	2	1	1	3	13	0–4 VSU	—	13–6
3	Chemseddine Fetairia (ALG)	2	0	2	1	6	0–4 VSU	1–3 VPO1	—

Source: UWW

Semifinals
Mohammad Nokhodi (IRI)	10
Gourav Baliyan (IND)	0
Bolat Sakayev (KAZ)	6
Chance Marsteller (USA)	1

Final
Mohammad Nokhodi (IRI)	10
Bolat Sakayev (KAZ)	6
Bronze medal
Gourav Baliyan (IND)	0
Chance Marsteller (USA)	10

==== Men's freestyle 86 kg ====
Legend

- F — Won by fall

Pos	Athlete	Pld	W	L	CP	TP	KAZ	TUR	TUN
1	Azamat Dauletbekov (KAZ)	2	2	0	8	21	—	9–1	11–0
2	Osman Göçen (TUR)	2	1	1	5	15	1–3 VPO1	—	10–0
3	Sabri Mnasria (TUN)	2	0	2	0	4	0–4 VSU	0–4 VSU	—

Source: UWW

==== Men's freestyle 92 kg ====
Legend

- F — Won by fall

Pos	Athlete	Pld	W	L	CP	TP	KAZ	IND	TUN	TUN
1	Abdimanap Baigenzheyev (KAZ)	3	3	0	11	18	—	4–2	4–0	10–0
2	Vicky Chahar (IND)	3	2	1	9	17	1–3 VPO1	—	7–3	8–0 Fall
3	Imed Kaddidi (TUN)	3	1	2	6	7	0–3 VPO	1–3 VPO1	—	4–0 Fall
4	Chihebeddine Chihi (TUN)	3	0	3	0	0	0–4 VSU	0–5 VFA	0–5 VFA	—

Source: UWW

==== Men's freestyle 97 kg ====
Legend

- F — Won by fall
- WO — Won by walkover

Quarterfinals		Semifinals		Final
Serik Bakytkhanov (KAZ)	3
Polat Polatçı (TUR)	3	Polat Polatçı (TUR)	1
Burak Şahin (TUR)	0	Kyle Snyder (USA)	12
Kyle Snyder (USA)	8^{F}			Kyle Snyder (USA)	11
Oktay Çiftçi (TUR)	0			Mamed Ibragimov (KAZ)	0
Mamed Ibragimov (KAZ)	5	Mamed Ibragimov (KAZ)	10
~~Mohamed Saadaoui (TUN)~~		Deepak Nehra (IND)	0
Deepak Nehra (IND)	WO

Bronze medals
Burak Şahin (TUR)	5
Polat Polatçı (TUR)	4
Oktay Çiftçi (TUR)	6
Deepak Nehra (IND)	16

==== Men's freestyle 125 kg ====
Legend

- F — Won by fall

Pos	Athlete	Pld	W	L	CP	TP	KAZ	KAZ	TUN
1	Alisher Yergali (KAZ)	2	2	0	8	13	—	5–1	8–0 Fall
2	Yusup Batirmurzaev (KAZ)	2	1	1	5	11	1–3 VPO1	—	10–0
3	Hamza Rahmani (TUN)	2	0	2	0	0	0–5 VFA	0–4 VSU	—

Source: UWW

Pos	Athlete	Pld	W	L	CP	TP	GEO	USA	IND
1	Geno Petriashvili (GEO)	2	2	0	7	18	—	8–2	10–0
2	Hayden Zillmer (USA)	2	1	1	4	9	1–3 VPO1	—	7–0
3	Mohit Grewal (IND)	2	0	2	0	0	0–4 VSU	0–3 VPO	—

Source: UWW

Semifinals
Alisher Yergali (KAZ)	5
Hayden Zillmer (USA)	6
Geno Petriashvili (GEO)	12
Yusup Batirmurzaev (KAZ)	2

Final
Hayden Zillmer (USA)	4
Geno Petriashvili (GEO)	8
Bronze medal
Alisher Yergali (KAZ)	2
Yusup Batirmurzaev (KAZ)	1

=== Men's Greco-Roman ===
==== Men's Greco-Roman 60 kg ====
Legend

- F — Won by fall

Pos	Athlete	Pld	W	L	CP	TP	TUR	IND	ALG	TUN
1	Ayhan Karakuş (TUR)	3	3	0	11	20	—	9–0	9–0	2–1
2	Arjun Halakurki (IND)	3	2	1	7	22	0–4 VSU	—	9–0	13–9
3	Abdelkarim Fergat (ALG)	3	1	2	3	10	0–4 VSU	0–4 VSU	—	10–4
4	Salim Hamdi (TUN)	3	0	3	3	14	1–3 VPO1	1–3 VPO1	1–3 VPO1	—

Source: UWW

==== Men's Greco-Roman 63 kg ====
Legend

- F — Won by fall

Pos	Athlete	Pld	W	L	CP	TP	IND	TUN
1	Gyanender Dahiya (IND)	1	1	0	4	9	—	9–0
2	Oussama Nasr (TUN)	1	0	1	0	0	0–4 VSU	—

Source: UWW

==== Men's Greco-Roman 67 kg ====
Legend

- F — Won by fall

Pos	Athlete	Pld	W	L	CP	TP	IND	IND	TUR	TUN
1	Sachin Sahrawat (IND)	3	2	1	9	19	—	1–3	8–0	10–1
2	Neeraj Chhikara (IND)	3	2	1	8	24	3–1 VPO1	—	11–8	13–4
3	Volkan Çakıl (TUR)	3	2	1	7	20	0–4 VSU	1–3 VPO1	—	9–0
4	Koussay Melki (TUN)	3	0	3	2	5	1–4 VSU1	1–4 VSU1	0–4 VSU	—

Source: UWW

==== Men's Greco-Roman 72 kg ====
Legend

- F — Won by fall

Pos	Athlete	Pld	W	L	CP	TP	TUR	BRA	TUN
1	Murat Dağ (TUR)	2	2	0	7	12	—	8–0	4–0
2	Kenedy Pedrosa (BRA)	2	1	1	3	11	0–4 VSU	—	11–10
3	Radhwen Tarhouni (TUN)	2	0	2	1	10	0–3 VPO	1–3 VPO1	—

Source: UWW

==== Men's Greco-Roman 77 kg ====
Legend

- F — Won by fall

Pos	Athlete	Pld	W	L	CP	TP	BUL	TUR	BRA	TUN
1	Aik Mnatsakanian (BUL)	3	3	0	11	23	—	6–1	9–0	8–0
2	Furkan Bayrak (TUR)	3	2	1	9	17	1–3 VPO1	—	8–0	8–0
3	Joílson Júnior (BRA)	3	1	2	4	8	0–4 VSU	0–4 VSU	—	8–0
4	Belhasan Azaouzi (TUN)	3	0	3	0	0	0–4 VSU	0–4 VSU	0–4 VSU	—

Source: UWW

==== Men's Greco-Roman 82 kg ====
Legend

- F — Won by fall

Pos	Athlete	Pld	W	L	CP	TP	TUR	IND	IND	TUN
1	Emrah Kuş (TUR)	3	2	1	9	22	—	8–0	9–0	5–9
2	Harpreet Singh Sandhu (IND)	3	2	1	8	6	0–4 VSU	—	2–1 Fall	4–2
3	Sajan Bhanwal (IND)	3	1	2	5	5	0–4 VSU	0–5 VFA	—	4–4 Fall
4	Lamjed Maafi (TUN)	3	1	2	4	15	3–1 VPO1	1–3 VPO1	0–5 VFA	—

Source: UWW

==== Men's Greco-Roman 87 kg ====
Legend

- F — Won by fall

Pos	Athlete	Pld	W	L	CP	TP	IND	TUN
1	Sunil Kumar (IND)	1	1	0	3	2	—	2–1
2	Skander Missaoui (TUN)	1	0	1	1	1	1–3 VPO1	—

Source: UWW

==== Men's Greco-Roman 97 kg ====
Legend

- F — Won by fall

Pos	Athlete	Pld	W	L	CP	TP	TUR	IND	ALG	TUN
1	Muhittin Sarıçiçek (TUR)	3	3	0	10	18	—	2–1	4–1	12–0
2	Deepanshu Ahlawat (IND)	3	2	1	7	10	1–3 VPO1	—	1–1	8–3
3	Adem Boudjemline (ALG)	3	1	2	6	11	1–3 VPO1	1–3 VPO1	—	9–0
4	Mohamed Dhia Jabri (TUN)	3	0	3	1	3	0–4 VSU	1–3 VPO1	0–4 VSU	—

Source: UWW

==== Men's Greco-Roman 130 kg ====
Legend

- F — Won by fall

Pos	Athlete	Pld	W	L	CP	TP	TUR	TUN	IND
1	Hamza Bakır (TUR)	2	2	0	6	8	—	5–1	3–0
2	Amine Guennichi (TUN)	2	1	1	4	6	1–3 VPO1	—	5–3
3	Naveen Sevlia (IND)	2	0	2	1	3	0–3 VPO	1–3 VPO1	—

Source: UWW

=== Women's freestyle ===
==== Women's freestyle 50 kg ====
Legend

- F — Won by fall

Quarterfinals		Semifinals		Final
Sarah Hildebrandt (USA)	10^{F}
Patricia Bermúdez (ARG)	0	Sarah Hildebrandt (USA)	5
Neelam Sirohi (IND)	9	Neelam Sirohi (IND)	2
Katie Dutchak (CAN)	5			Sarah Hildebrandt (USA)	11
Emily Shilson (USA)	9^{F}			Emily Shilson (USA)	0
Zehra Demirhan (TUR)	0	Emily Shilson (USA)	11
Kamila Barbosa (BRA)	1	Lisa Ersel (GER)	1
Lisa Ersel (GER)	4^{F}

Bronze medals
Patricia Bermúdez (ARG)	4^{F}
Neelam Sirohi (IND)	1
Zehra Demirhan (TUR)	2
Lisa Ersel (GER)	3

==== Women's freestyle 53 kg ====
Legend

- F — Won by fall
- WO — Won by walkover

Pos	Athlete	Pld	W	L	CP	TP	IND	USA	ECU	TUN
1	Antim Panghal (IND)	3	3	0	12	19	—	11–0	4–2	4–0 Fall
2	Dominique Parrish (USA)	3	2	1	7	17	0–4 VSU	—	7–4	10–0
3	Luisa Valverde (ECU)	3	1	2	7	14	1–3 VPO1	1–3 VPO1	—	8–0 Fall
4	Nour Raouafi (TUN)	3	0	3	0	0	0–5 VFA	0–4 VSU	0–5 VFA	—

Source: UWW

Pos	Athlete	Pld	W	L	CP	TP	CAN	TUR	TUN
1	Karla Godinez (CAN)	2	2	0	8	20	—	10–0	10–0
2	Esra Pul (TUR)	2	1	1	3	1	0–4 VSU	—	1–1
3	Sarra Hamdi (TUN)	2	0	2	1	1	0–4 VSU	1–3 VPO1	—

Source: UWW

Semifinals
Antim Panghal (IND)	8^{F}
Esra Pul (TUR)	0
Karla Godinez (CAN)	3
Dominique Parrish (USA)	1

Final
Antim Panghal (IND)	4
Karla Godinez (CAN)	2
Bronze medal
Esra Pul (TUR)	WO
Dominique Parrish (USA)

==== Women's freestyle 55 kg ====
Legend

- F — Won by fall

Pos	Athlete	Pld	W	L	CP	TP	IND	TUN
1	Nina Hemmer (GER)	1	1	0	5	4	—	4–0 Fall
2	Lobna Ichaoui (TUN)	1	0	1	0	0	0–5 VFA	—

Source: UWW

==== Women's freestyle 57 kg ====
Legend

- F — Won by fall
- WO — Won by walkover

Pos	Athlete	Pld	W	L	CP	TP	USA	IND	GER	USA
1	Helen Maroulis (USA)	3	3	0	11	21	—	8–5	5–3	8–0 Fall
2	Mansi Ahlawat (IND)	3	2	1	9	18	1–3 VPO1	—	3–0	10–0 Fall
3	Sandra Paruszewski (GER)	3	1	2	4	9	1–3 VPO1	0–3 VPO	—	6–0
4	Amanda Martinez (USA)	3	0	3	0	0	0–5 VFA	0–5 VFA	0–3 VPO	—

Source: UWW

Pos	Athlete	Pld	W	L	CP	TP	BRA	TUR	TUN
1	Giullia Oliveira (BRA)	2	2	0	8	10	—	6–2	4–0 Fall
2	Elvira Kamaloğlu (TUR)	2	1	1	6	11	1–3 VPO1	—	9–0 Fall
3	Faten Hammami (TUN)	2	0	2	0	0	0–5 VFA	0–5 VFA	—

Source: UWW

Semifinals
Helen Maroulis (USA)	7
Elvira Kamaloğlu (TUR)	4^{F}
Giullia Oliveira (BRA)	11^{F}
Mansi Ahlawat (IND)	1

Final
Elvira Kamaloğlu (TUR)	1
Giullia Oliveira (BRA)	5^{F}
Bronze medal
Helen Maroulis (USA)
Mansi Ahlawat (IND)	WO

==== Women's freestyle 59 kg ====
Legend

- F — Won by fall
- WO — Won by walkover

Pos	Athlete	Pld	W	L	CP	TP	IND	GER	TUN	CAN
1	Sarita Mor (IND)	3	3	0	11	30	—	6–0	14–4	10–0
2	Elena Brugger (GER)	3	2	1	9	11	0–3 VPO	—	11–0	WO
3	Siwar Bouseta (TUN)	3	1	2	4	10	1–4 VSU1	0–4 VSU	—	6–6
4	Diana Weicker (CAN)	3	0	3	1	6	0–4 VSU	0–5 VIN	1–3 VPO1	—

Source: UWW

==== Women's freestyle 62 kg ====
Legend

- F — Won by fall
- WO — Won by walkover

Pos	Athlete	Pld	W	L	CP	TP	GER	BRA	IND	TUN
1	Luisa Niemesch (GER)	3	3	0	11	9	—	4–2	5–2	WO
2	Laís Nunes (BRA)	3	2	1	11	6	1–3 VPO1	—	4–0 Fall	WO
3	Sakshi Malik (IND)	3	1	2	6	2	1–3 VPO1	0–5 VFA	—	WO
—	Marwa Amri (TUN)	3	0	3	0	0	0–5 VFO	0–5 VFO	0–5 VFO	—

Source: UWW

==== Women's freestyle 65 kg ====
Legend

- F — Won by fall

Pos	Athlete	Pld	W	L	CP	TP	TUN	USA	IND
1	Khadija Jlassi (TUN)	2	1	1	4	0	—	6–7	8–6
2	Emma Bruntil (USA)	2	1	1	4	0	3–1 VPO1	—	1–2
3	Manisha Bhanwala (IND)	2	1	1	4	8	1–3 VPO1	3–1 VPO1	—

Source: UWW

==== Women's freestyle 68 kg ====
Legend

- F — Won by fall

Pos	Athlete	Pld	W	L	CP	TP	USA	IND	BRA	TUN
1	Tamyra Mensah-Stock (USA)	3	3	0	12	30	—	10–0	10–0	10–0
2	Nisha Dahiya (IND)	3	2	1	8	20	0–4 VSU	—	10–0	10–0
3	Gabriela Rocha (BRA)	3	1	2	5	6	0–4 VSU	0–4 VSU	—	6–3 Fall
4	Ranim Saidi (TUN)	3	0	3	0	3	0–4 VSU	0–4 VSU	0–5 VFA	—

Source: UWW

==== Women's freestyle 72 kg ====
Legend

- F — Won by fall
- WO — Won by walkover

Quarterfinals		Semifinals		Final
Marilyn Garcia (USA)	1
Zaineb Sghaier (TUN)	4	Zaineb Sghaier (TUN)	0
~~Amit Elor (USA)~~		Bipasha Dahiya (IND)	2^{F}
Bipasha Dahiya (IND)	WO			Bipasha Dahiya (IND)	5
Nour Jeljeli (TUN)	2			Buse Tosun (TUR)	10
Manju Manju (IND)	9	Manju Manju (IND)	2
Buse Tosun (TUR)	10	Buse Tosun (TUR)	6
Skylar Grote (USA)	0

Bronze medals
~~Amit Elor (USA)~~
Zaineb Sghaier (TUN)	WO
Skylar Grote (USA)	10
Manju Manju (IND)	0

==== Women's freestyle 76 kg ====
Legend

- F — Won by fall

Pos	Athlete	Pld	W	L	CP	TP	EGY	GER	USA
1	Samar Amer (EGY)	2	2	0	8	13	—	6–4	7–0 Fall
2	Francy Rädelt (GER)	2	1	1	4	10	1–3 VPO1	—	6–3
3	Precious Bell (USA)	2	0	2	1	3	0–5 VFA	1–3 VPO1	—

Source: UWW

Pos	Athlete	Pld	W	L	CP	TP	USA	USA	TUR
1	Dymond Guilford (USA)	2	2	0	7	17	—	7–6	10–0
2	Yelena Makoyed (USA)	2	1	1	5	20	1–3 VPO1	—	14–1
3	Mehtap Gültekin (TUR)	2	0	2	1	1	0–4 VSU	1–4 VSU1	—

Source: UWW

Semifinals
Samar Amer (EGY)	6
Yelena Makoyed (USA)	10^{F}
Dymond Guilford (USA)	10
Francy Rädelt (GER)	0

Final
Yelena Makoyed (USA)	5
Dymond Guilford (USA)	2
Bronze medal
Samar Amer (EGY)	3
Francy Rädelt (GER)	1
