= 2018 World Wrestling Championships – Women's freestyle 53 kg =

Women's freestyle 53 kg at the 2018 World Championships
- Venue: László Papp Budapest Sports Arena
- Dates: 24–25 October 2018
- Competitors: 23 from 23 nations

Medalists
gold medal	Haruna Okuno	Japan
silver medal	Sarah Hildebrandt	United States
bronze medal	Diana Weicker	Canada
bronze medal	Pang Qianyu	China

The women's freestyle 53 kilograms is a competition featured at the 2018 World Wrestling Championships. It was held in Budapest, Hungary on 24 and 25 October.

This freestyle wrestling competition consists of a single-elimination tournament, with a repechage used to determine the winner of two bronze medals. The two finalists face off for gold and silver medals. Each wrestler who loses to one of the two finalists moves into the repechage, culminating in a pair of bronze medal matches featuring the semifinal losers each facing the remaining repechage opponent from their half of the bracket.

== Results ==
Legend

- F — Won by fall

=== Final ===
Final
Sarah Hildebrandt (USA)	0
Haruna Okuno (JPN)	11

=== Top half ===
Round of 32
Zeynep Yetgil (TUR)	2
Vanesa Kaladzinskaya (BLR)	3

Round of 16
Sarah Hildebrandt (USA)	5
Zhuldyz Eshimova (KAZ)	1
Chiu Hsin-ju (TPE)	0
Anzhela Dorogan (AZE)	10
Estera Tămăduianu-Dobre (ROU)	3
Diana Weicker (CAN)	8
Nina Hemmer (GER)	4^{F}
Vanesa Kaladzinskaya (BLR)	1

Quarterfinals
Sarah Hildebrandt (USA)	15
Anzhela Dorogan (AZE)	9
Diana Weicker (CAN)	10
Nina Hemmer (GER)	7

Semifinals
Sarah Hildebrandt (USA)	10
Diana Weicker (CAN)	0

=== Bottom half ===
Round of 32
Mercédesz Dénes (HUN)	0
Betzabeth Argüello (VEN)	11
Pang Qianyu (CHN)	11
Stalvira Orshush (RUS)	0
Haruna Okuno (JPN)	6
Hilary Honorine (FRA)	3
Erdenechimegiin Sumiyaa (MGL)	4^{F}
Lee Shin-hye (KOR)	0
Khrystyna Bereza (UKR)	1
Luisa Valverde (ECU)	6
Iulia Leorda (MDA)	0
Pinki (IND)	11

Round of 16
Maria Prevolaraki (GRE)	3
Betzabeth Argüello (VEN)	1
Pang Qianyu (CHN)	1
Haruna Okuno (JPN)	4
Erdenechimegiin Sumiyaa (MGL)	2
Luisa Valverde (ECU)	4^{F}
Pinki (IND)	2
Katarzyna Krawczyk (POL)	7

Quarterfinals
Maria Prevolaraki (GRE)	1
Haruna Okuno (JPN)	9
Luisa Valverde (ECU)	5
Katarzyna Krawczyk (POL)	11

Semifinals
Haruna Okuno (JPN)	8
Katarzyna Krawczyk (POL)	1

=== Repechage ===
Repechage round 1
Hilary Honorine (FRA)	1
Pang Qianyu (CHN)	12

Repechage round 2
Zhuldyz Eshimova (KAZ)	5
Anzhela Dorogan (AZE)	3
Pang Qianyu (CHN)	3
Maria Prevolaraki (GRE)	2

Bronze medals
Zhuldyz Eshimova (KAZ)	2
Diana Weicker (CAN)	3
Pang Qianyu (CHN)	2
Katarzyna Krawczyk (POL)	1
