= 2025 World Wrestling Championships – Women's freestyle 53 kg =

Wrestling competitions

Women's freestyle 53 kg at the 2025 World Championships
- Venue: Arena Zagreb
- Dates: 17–18 September 2025
- Competitors: 23 from 21 nations

Medalists
gold medal	Haruna Murayama	Japan
silver medal	Lucía Yépez	Ecuador
bronze medal	Antim Panghal	India
bronze medal	Choe Hyo-gyong	North Korea

The women's freestyle 53 kilograms is a competition featured at the 2025 World Wrestling Championships, and was held in Zagreb, Croatia on 17 and 18 September 2025.

This freestyle wrestling competition consists of a single-elimination tournament, with a repechage used to determine the winner of two bronze medals. The two finalists face off for gold and silver medals. Each wrestler who loses to one of the two finalists moves into the repechage, culminating in a pair of bronze medal matches, featuring the semifinal losers each facing the remaining repechage opponent from their half of the bracket.

== Results ==
Legend

- F — Won by fall

=== Final ===
Final
Lucía Yépez (ECU)	0
Haruna Murayama (JPN)	5

=== Top half ===
Round of 32
Roksana Zasina (POL)	6
Liliia Malanchuk (UKR)	4
Felicity Taylor (USA)	0
Zhang Jin (CHN)	10
Laura Stanelytė (LTU)	0
Carla Jaume (ESP)	10

Round of 16
Lucía Yépez (ECU)	5^{F}
Laura Herin (CUB)	4
Roksana Zasina (POL)	1
Jonna Malmgren (SWE)	5
Natalia Malysheva (UWW)	1
Zhang Jin (CHN)	10
Carla Jaume (ESP)	0
Antim Panghal (IND)	10

Quarterfinals
Lucía Yépez (ECU)	4
Jonna Malmgren (SWE)	2
Zhang Jin (CHN)	8
Antim Panghal (IND)	9

Semifinals
Lucía Yépez (ECU)	5
Antim Panghal (IND)	3

=== Bottom half ===
Round of 32
Zeinep Bayanova (KAZ)	2
Park Seo-young (KOR)	3
Haruna Murayama (JPN)	11
Shokhida Akhmedova (UZB)	0
Serena Di Benedetto (CAN)	1
Kseniya Stankevich (UWW)	2
Tsogt-Ochiryn Namuuntsetseg (MGL)	12
Beatrice Ferenț (ROU)	5

Round of 16
Zeynep Yetgil (TUR)	6
Park Seo-young (KOR)	0
Haruna Murayama (JPN)	11
Annika Wendle (GER)	0
Maria Prevolaraki (GRE)	2^{F}
Kseniya Stankevich (UWW)	0
Tsogt-Ochiryn Namuuntsetseg (MGL)	0
Choe Hyo-gyong (PRK)	10

Quarterfinals
Zeynep Yetgil (TUR)	0
Haruna Murayama (JPN)	7
Maria Prevolaraki (GRE)	0
Choe Hyo-gyong (PRK)	11

Semifinals
Haruna Murayama (JPN)	2
Choe Hyo-gyong (PRK)	1

=== Repechage ===
Repechage round 1
Shokhida Akhmedova (UZB)	8
Annika Wendle (GER)	4

Repechage round 2
Laura Herin (CUB)	1
Jonna Malmgren (SWE)	9
Shokhida Akhmedova (UZB)	8^{F}
Zeynep Yetgil (TUR)	1

Bronze medals
Jonna Malmgren (SWE)	1
Antim Panghal (IND)	9
Shokhida Akhmedova (UZB)	0
Choe Hyo-gyong (PRK)	8^{F}

== Final standing ==
Rank	Athlete
1st place, gold medalist(s)	Haruna Murayama (JPN)
2nd place, silver medalist(s)	Lucía Yépez (ECU)
3rd place, bronze medalist(s)	Antim Panghal (IND)
3rd place, bronze medalist(s)	Choe Hyo-gyong (PRK)
5	Jonna Malmgren (SWE)
5	Shokhida Akhmedova (UZB)
7	Zhang Jin (CHN)
8	Maria Prevolaraki (GRE)
9	Carla Jaume (ESP)
10	Roksana Zasina (POL)
11	Tsogt-Ochiryn Namuuntsetseg (MGL)
12	Zeynep Yetgil (TUR)
13	Park Seo-young (KOR)
14	Kseniya Stankevich (UWW)
15	Beatrice Ferenț (ROU)
16	Laura Herin (CUB)
17	Liliia Malanchuk (UKR)
18	Annika Wendle (GER)
19	Zeinep Bayanova (KAZ)
20	Serena Di Benedetto (CAN)
21	Natalia Malysheva (UWW)
22	Felicity Taylor (USA)
23	Laura Stanelytė (LTU)
