= Laura Herin =

Cuban wrestler (born 2001)

Personal information
- Full name: Laura Herin Ávila
- Nationality: Cuban
- Born: 8 April 2001 (age 25)

Sport
- Sport: Wrestling
- Weight class: 53 kg
Medal record
Women's freestyle wrestling
Representing Cuba
Pan American Games
Silver medal – second place	2023 Santiago	53 kg
Pan American Championships
Bronze medal – third place	2023 Buenos Aires	53 kg
Central American and Caribbean Games
Gold medal – first place	2023 San Salvador	53 kg
Gold medal – first place	2026 Santo Domingo	53 kg
Junior Pan American Games
Gold medal – first place	2021 Cali-Valle	53 kg

Laura Herin Ávila (Note: In this Spanish name, the first or paternal surname is Herin and the second or maternal family name is Ávila.) (born 8 April 2001) is a Cuban wrestler. She competed in the women's freestyle 53 kg event at the 2020 Summer Olympics held in Tokyo, Japan. She lost her first match against Pang Qianyu of China and she was then eliminated in the repechage by Jacarra Winchester of the United States. A few months later, she won the gold medal in the women's 53 kg event at the 2021 Junior Pan American Games held in Cali, Colombia.

== Career ==
Herin won the gold medal in the women's 53 kg event at the 2021 Junior Pan American Games held in Cali, Colombia. As a result, she directly qualified to compete in the women's 53 kg event at the 2023 Pan American Games in Santiago, Chile.

Herin competed in the 53 kg event at the 2022 World Wrestling Championships held in Belgrade, Serbia.

Herin won one of the bronze medals in her event at the 2023 Pan American Wrestling Championships held in Buenos Aires, Argentina. She defeated Thalía Mallqui of Peru in her bronze medal match. Herin won the silver medal in the women's 53 kg event at the 2023 Pan American Games held in Santiago, Chile. In the final, she lost against Lucía Yépez of Ecuador.

Herin competed at the 2024 Pan American Wrestling Olympic Qualification Tournament held in Acapulco, Mexico hoping to qualify for the 2024 Summer Olympics in Paris, France. She was eliminated in her second match by Dominique Parrish of the United States.

== Achievements ==
Year	Tournament	Location	Result	Event
2023	Pan American Wrestling Championships	Buenos Aires, Argentina	3rd	Freestyle 53 kg
2023	Central American and Caribbean Games	San Salvador, El Salvador	1st	Freestyle 53 kg
2023	Pan American Games	Santiago, Chile	2nd	Freestyle 53 kg
2026	Central American and Caribbean Games	Santo Domingo, Dominican Republic	1st	Freestyle 53 kg
