= 2022 U23 World Wrestling Championships – Women's freestyle 53 kg =

Wrestling competitions

Women's freestyle 53 kg at the 2022 U23 World Championships
- Venue: Pontevedra Municipal Sports Hall
- Dates: 20–21 October
- Competitors: 18 from 18 nations

Medalists
| gold medal | Haruna Okuno | Japan |
| silver medal | Lucía Yépez | Ecuador |
| bronze medal | Anastasia Blayvas | Germany |
| bronze medal | Zeynep Yetgil | Turkey |

The women's freestyle 53 kilograms is a competition featured at the 2022 U23 World Wrestling Championships, and was held in Pontevedra, Spain on 20 and 21 October 2022. The qualification rounds were held on 19 October while medal matches were held on the 2nd day of the competition. A total of 18 wrestlers competed in this event, limited to athletes whose body weight was less than 53 kilograms.

This freestyle wrestling competition consists of a single-elimination tournament, with a repechage used to determine the winner of two bronze medals. The two finalists face off for gold and silver medals. Each wrestler who loses to one of the two finalists moves into the repechage, culminating in a pair of bronze medal matches featuring the semifinal losers each facing the remaining repechage opponent from their half of the bracket.

== Results ==
Legend

- F — Won by fall

=== Final ===
| Final |
| Haruna Okuno (JPN) | 10 |
| Lucía Yépez (ECU) | 0 |

=== Top half ===
Round of 32
Mariana Rojas (VEN) | 2^{F}
Taylor McPherson (CAN) | 0

Round of 16
Anastasia Blayvas (GER) | 2^{F}
Lilia Malanchuk (UKR) | 4
Mariana Rojas (VEN) | 0
Haruna Okuno (JPN) | 10
Felicity Taylor (USA) | 2^{F}
Aikaterini Vekri (GRE) | 0
Javiera Ortega (CHI) | 2
Ellada Makhyaddinova (KAZ) | 11

Quarterfinals
Anastasia Blayvas (GER) | 0
Haruna Okuno (JPN) | 6
Felicity Taylor (USA) | 12
Ellada Makhyaddinova (KAZ) | 2

Semifinals
Haruna Okuno (JPN) | 11
Felicity Taylor (USA) | 1

=== Bottom half ===
Round of 32
Beatrice Ferenţ (ROU) | 0
Mariana Drăguțan (MDA) | 5

Round of 16
Gultakin Shirinova (AZE) | 0
Zeynep Yetgil (TUR) | 10
Zeltzin Hernández (MEX) | 6^{F}
Chamodya Don (SRI) | 0
Carla Jaume (ESP) | 0
Mariana Drăguțan (MDA) | 10
Lucía Yépez (ECU) | 10
Hsieh Meng-hsuan (TPE) | 0

Quarterfinals
Zeynep Yetgil (TUR) | 10
Zeltzin Hernández (MEX) | 5
Mariana Drăguțan (MDA) | 4
Lucía Yépez (ECU) | 15

Semifinals
Zeynep Yetgil (TUR) | 0
Lucía Yépez (ECU) | 10

=== Repechage ===
Repechage round 2
Mariana Rojas (VEN) | 2
Anastasia Blayvas (GER) | 3
Hsieh Meng-hsuan (TPE) | 12
Mariana Drăguțan (MDA) | 6

Bronze medals
Anastasia Blayvas (GER) | 3
Felicity Taylor (USA) | 3
Hsieh Meng-hsuan (TPE) | 0
Zeynep Yetgil (TUR) | 7

== Final standing ==
| Rank | Athlete |
|---|---|
| 1st place, gold medalist(s) | Haruna Okuno (JPN) |
| 2nd place, silver medalist(s) | Lucía Yépez (ECU) |
| 3rd place, bronze medalist(s) | Anastasia Blayvas (GER) |
| 3rd place, bronze medalist(s) | Zeynep Yetgil (TUR) |
| 5 | Felicity Taylor (USA) |
| 5 | Hsieh Meng-hsuan (TPE) |
| 7 | Mariana Drăguțan (MDA) |
| 8 | Zeltzin Hernández (MEX) |
| 9 | Mariana Rojas (VEN) |
| 10 | Ellada Makhyaddinova (KAZ) |
| 11 | Javiera Ortega (CHI) |
| 12 | Lilia Malanchuk (UKR) |
| 13 | Taylor McPherson (CAN) |
| 14 | Aikaterini Vekri (GRE) |
| 15 | Beatrice Ferenţ (ROU) |
| 16 | Chamodya Don (SRI) |
| 17 | Gultakin Shirinova (AZE) |
| 18 | Carla Jaume (ESP) |
