= Wrestling at the 2023 Pan American Games – Women's freestyle 53 kg =

Women's freestyle 53 at the 2023 Pan American Games
- Venue: Olympic Training Center in Ñuñoa
- Dates: November 3
- Competitors: 9 from 9 nations

Medalists
Gold medal	Lucía Yépez	Ecuador
Silver medal	Laura Herin	Cuba
Bronze medal	Betzabeth Argüello	Venezuela
Bronze medal	Antonia Valdés	Chile

The Women's Freestyle 53 kg competition of the Wrestling events at the 2023 Pan American Games in Ñuñoa was held on November 3.

== Qualification ==
The winner of each weight category at the 2021 Junior Pan American Games in Cali, Colombia qualified directly, along with the top four at the 2022 Pan American Wrestling Championships and 2023 Pan American Wrestling Championships. The host country (Chile) is guaranteed a spot in each event, but its athletes must compete in both the 2022 and 2023 Pan American Championship. If Chile does not qualify at any of the first two events, it will take the fourth spot available at the 2023 Pan American Championships. A further six wildcards (four men and two women) will be awarded to nations without any qualified athlete but took part in the qualification tournaments.

== Schedule ==
All times are local (UTC−3)

Date	Time	Event
Wednesday, 3 November 2023	10:00	Round of 16
Wednesday, 3 November 2023	11:00	Quarterfinals
Wednesday, 3 November 2023	12:00	Semifinals
Wednesday, 3 November 2023	17:00	Finals

== Results ==
Legend

- F — Won by fall

=== Main Bracket ===
Round of 16
María González (DOM)	0
Karla Acosta (MEX)	10

Quarterfinals
Betzabeth Argüello (VEN)	13^{F}
Karla Acosta (MEX)	10
Laura Herin (CUB)	4^{F}
Samara Chavez (USA)	0
Kathia Caballero (PAN)	0
Antonia Valdés (CHI)	10^{F}
Thalía Mallqui (PER)	0
Lucía Yépez (ECU)	10

Semifinals
Betzabeth Argüello (VEN)	4
Laura Herin (CUB)	5
Antonia Valdés (CHI)	3
Lucía Yépez (ECU)	13

Finals
Laura Herin (CUB)	0
Lucía Yépez (ECU)	6

=== Repechage ===
Bronze medal match
Samara Chavez (USA)	2
Betzabeth Argüello (VEN)	12
Thalía Mallqui (PER)	2
Antonia Valdés (CHI)	4

== Final standing ==
Rank	Athlete
1st place, gold medalist(s)	Lucía Yépez (ECU)
2nd place, silver medalist(s)	Laura Herin (CUB)
3rd place, bronze medalist(s)	Betzabeth Argüello (VEN)
3rd place, bronze medalist(s)	Antonia Valdés (CHI)
5	Samara Chavez (USA)
5	Thalía Mallqui (PER)
7	Karla Acosta (MEX)
8	María González (DOM)
9	Kathia Caballero (PAN)
