= Choe Hyo-gyong =

North Korean wrestler (born 2000)

Personal information
- Born: 10 May 2000 (age 26) Pyongyang, North Korea

Sport
- Country: North Korea
- Sport: Wrestling
- Weight class: 53 kg
Medal record
Women's freestyle wrestling
Representing North Korea
Olympic Games
Bronze medal – third place	2024 Paris	53 kg
World Championships
Bronze medal – third place	2025 Zagreb	53 kg
Asian Games
Bronze medal – third place	2022 Hangzhou	53 kg
Asian Championships
Gold medal – first place	2025 Amman	53 kg
Golden Grand Prix Ivan Yarygin
Gold medal – first place	2026 Krasnoyarsk	53 kg

Choe Hyo-gyong (born 10 May 2000) is a North Korean wrestler. She competed at the 2024 Summer Olympics, winning a bronze medal.
