= Mayu Mukaida =

Japanese freestyle wrestler

Personal information
- Native name: 向田 真優
- Nationality: Japanese
- Born: 22 June 1997 (age 29) Yokkaichi, Mie Prefecture, Japan
- Height: 157 cm (5 ft 2 in)

Sport
- Country: Japan
- Sport: Wrestling
- Event: Freestyle
- College team: Shigakkan University
Medal record
Women's freestyle wrestling
Representing Japan
Olympic Games
Gold medal – first place	2020 Tokyo	53 kg
World Championships
Gold medal – first place	2016 Budapest	55 kg
Gold medal – first place	2018 Budapest	55 kg
Gold medal – first place	2022 Belgrade	55 kg
Silver medal – second place	2017 Paris	53 kg
Silver medal – second place	2019 Nur-Sultan	53 kg
Asian Championships
Gold medal – first place	2017 New Delhi	53 kg
Silver medal – second place	2019 Xi'an	53 kg
Silver medal – second place	2020 New Delhi	53 kg
Youth Olympic Games
Gold medal – first place	2014 Nanjing	52 kg

Mayu Shidochi (志土地 真優, Shidochi Mayu; née Mukaida (向田), born 22 June 1997) is a Japanese freestyle wrestler. She won the gold medal in the 53 kg event at the 2020 Summer Olympics held in Tokyo, Japan.

== Career ==
She competed at the 2014 Youth Summer Olympics, 2017 World Wrestling Championships, 2018 World Wrestling Championships, and 2019 World Wrestling Championships.

In 2018, she won the gold medal at Budapest World Wrestling Championships in women's 55 kg.

She won the gold medal in the 55 kg event again at the 2022 World Wrestling Championships held in Belgrade, Serbia.

At the Tokyo Olympics, she faced China's Pang Qianyu in the final. Despite trailing 0–4 after the first period, she scored five points in the second period to defeat Pang 5–4 and win the gold medal.

== See also ==
- List of Youth Olympic Games gold medalists who won Olympic gold medals
