= Pak Yong-mi =

North Korean amateur wrestler

Personal information
- Nationality: (North Korea) North Korean
- Born: 8 February 1991 (age 35)
- Height: 1.61 m (5 ft 3 in)
- Weight: 48 kg (106 lb)

Sport
- Country: North Korea
- Sport: Wrestling
- Event: Free style
Medal record
Women's freestyle wrestling
Representing North Korea
World Championships
Gold medal – first place	2019 Nur-Sultan	53 kg
Asian Games
Gold medal – first place	2018 Jakarta	53 kg
Asian Championships
Gold medal – first place	2013 New Delhi	48kg
Gold medal – first place	2018 Bishkek	53kg
Gold medal – first place	2019 Xi'an	53kg
Silver medal – second place	2015 Doha	53kg

Korean name
- Hangul: 박영미
- RR: Bak Yeongmi
- MR: Pak Yŏngmi

Pak Yong-mi (born 8 February 1991) is a North Korean sport wrestler who competes in the women's freestyle category and a current world champion in the women's 53 kg Freestyle event. She won the gold medal in the women's 53 kg event during the 2019 World Wrestling Championships. She also qualified to represent North Korea at the 2020 Summer Olympics in Tokyo, Japan following the gold medal success at the 2019 World Wrestling Championships. However, in June 2021, North Korea withdrew from the 2020 Summer Olympics which meant that Luisa Valverde of Ecuador would compete instead.
