= Wrestling at the 2018 Commonwealth Games – Women's freestyle 53 kg =

Wrestling – Women's freestyle 53 kg at the 2018 Commonwealth Games
- Venue: Carrara Sports and Leisure Centre
- Dates: 12 April 2018
- Competitors: 5 from 5 nations

Medalists
gold medal	Diana Weicker	Canada
silver medal	Babita Kumari	India
bronze medal	Bose Samuel	Nigeria

The women's freestyle 53 kg freestyle wrestling competition at the 2018 Commonwealth Games in Gold Coast, Australia was held on 12 April at the Carrara Sports and Leisure Centre.

== Results ==
As there were less than 6 competitors entered in this event, the competition was contested as a Nordic round with each athlete playing every other athlete. The medallists were determined by the standings after the completion of the Nordic round.

Legend

- F — Won by fall

=== Nordic group ===
Pos	Athlete	Pld	W	L	CP	TP
1	Babita Kumari (IND)	4	4	0	15	36
2	Diana Weicker (CAN)	4	3	1	14	12
3	Bose Samuel (NGR)	4	2	2	10	21
4	Deepika Dilhani (SRI)	4	1	3	3	10
5	Carissa Holland (AUS)	4	0	4	1	2

Source: UWW

	Score		CP
Carissa Holland (AUS)	2–10	Deepika Dilhani (SRI)	1–3 VPO1
Babita Kumari (IND)	2–1	Bose Samuel (NGR)	3–1 VPO1
Diana Weicker (CAN)	10–0	Carissa Holland (AUS)	4–0 VSU
Deepika Dilhani (SRI)	0–4 Fall	Babita Kumari (IND)	0–5 VFA
Bose Samuel (NGR)	10–0	Carissa Holland (AUS)	4–0 VSU
Diana Weicker (CAN)	10–0	Deepika Dilhani (SRI)	4–0 VSU
Babita Kumari (IND)	4–0 Fall	Carissa Holland (AUS)	5–0 VFA
Bose Samuel (NGR)	0–11	Diana Weicker (CAN)	0–4 VSU
Deepika Dilhani (SRI)	0–10 Fall	Bose Samuel (NGR)	0–5 VFA
Babita Kumari (IND)	0–5	Diana Weicker (CAN)	0–3 VPO
