= Wrestling at the 2024 Summer Olympics – Women's freestyle 53 kg =

Women's freestyle 53 kg at the Games of the XXXIII Olympiad
- Venue: Grand Palais Éphémère
- Date: 7–8 August 2024
- Competitors: 16 from 16 nations

Medalists
1st place, gold medalist(s)		Akari Fujinami	Japan
2nd place, silver medalist(s)		Lucía Yépez	Ecuador
3rd place, bronze medalist(s)		Choe Hyo-gyong	North Korea
3rd place, bronze medalist(s)		Pang Qianyu	China

Women's freestyle 53 kilograms competition at the 2024 Summer Olympics in Paris, France, took place on 7–8 August 2024 at the Grand Palais Éphémère in Champ de Mars.

== Background ==
This was a sixth appearance of the woman's bantamweight category, debut in 2004 and it has appeared in every games since then.

- 2004–2012: 55kg
- 2016–current: 53kg

Akari Fujinami won the event by beating Lucía Yépez in the final, marking Ecuador's first ever medal in Wrestling, returned 2020 silver medalist Pang Qianyu and Choe Hyo-gyong won bronze medals with Choe going through repechage.

== Format ==
This freestyle wrestling competition consists of a single-elimination tournament, with a repechage used to determine the winner of two bronze medals. The two finalists face off for gold and silver medals. Each wrestler who loses to one of the two finalists moves into the repechage, culminating in a pair of bronze medal matches featuring the semifinal losers each facing the remaining repechage opponent from their half of the bracket.

== Rules ==
A typical bout consists of two halves of three minutes each separated by a 30-second break. The two competitors compete on a mat, which is nine meters in diameter. Wrestlers try to score points by executing various legal maneuvers. Points ranging from one to five are awarded by the mat referee depending on the degree of difficulty of the maneuvers. Points are also awarded to the opponent in case of infractions such as illegal holds, passivity etc. A wrestler is automatically disqualified if three cautions are awarded during a bout. Forcing an opponent's shoulders to the mat results in an instant victory by fall.

During the course of a match, if a wrestler builds a 10-point advantage over the opponent, the bout is stopped and the leader is declared as the winner by technical superiority. The total scores are totaled at the end of the stipulated six-minute period, and the wrestler with the maximum points wins. In case of a tie, the wrestler who has scored the last point is declared the winner. A competitor might also be declared a winner if the opponent does not turn up or is medically unfit to compete.

== Qualification ==
Sixteen quota places were available with each nation restricted to a maximum of one spot. Five quota places were awarded at the 2023 World Wrestling Championships, which took place from the 16th to 24th of September in Belgrade, Serbia. The finalists of each category in the four continental qualification tournaments (Asia, Europe, the Americas, and the joint Africa & Oceania) were awarded quota places. The remainder of the total quota was allocated at the 2024 World Wrestling Olympic Qualification Tournament, offering a minimum of three quota places.

== Schedule ==
All times are Central European Time (UTC+02:00)

Date	Time	Event
7 August 2024	11:30	Qualification rounds
7 August 2024	18:15	Semifinals
8 August 2024	11:00	Repechage
8 August 2024	19:15	Finals

== Results ==
Legend

- F — Won by fall

=== Main bracket ===
Round of 16
Lucía Yépez (ECU)	7
Choe Hyo-gyong (PRK)	4
Mariana Drăguțan (MDA)	0
Andreea Ana (ROU)	5
Maria Prevolaraki (GRE)	2
Annika Wendle (GER)	3
Zeynep Yetgil (TUR)	10
Antim Panghal (IND)	0
Akari Fujinami (JPN)	6^{F}
Dominique Parrish (USA)	0
Batkhuyagiin Khulan (MGL)	3^{F}
Christianah Ogunsanya (NGR)	1
Pang Qianyu (CHN)	10
Mia-Lahnee Aquino (GUM)	0
Betzabeth Argüello (VEN)	3
Jonna Malmgren (SWE)	5^{F}

Quarterfinals
Lucía Yépez (ECU)	7^{F}
Andreea Ana (ROU)	0
Annika Wendle (GER)	2^{F}
Zeynep Yetgil (TUR)	5
Akari Fujinami (JPN)	8^{F}
Batkhuyagiin Khulan (MGL)	2
Pang Qianyu (CHN)	10
Jonna Malmgren (SWE)	2

Semifinals
Lucía Yépez (ECU)	10
Annika Wendle (GER)	0
Akari Fujinami (JPN)	10
Pang Qianyu (CHN)	0

Final
Lucía Yépez (ECU)	0
Akari Fujinami (JPN)	10

=== Repechage ===
Repechage
Choe Hyo-gyong (PRK)	11
Andreea Ana (ROU)	0
Dominique Parrish (USA)	4
Batkhuyagiin Khulan (MGL)	10^{F}

Bronze medal matches
Choe Hyo-gyong (PRK)	10
Annika Wendle (GER)	0
Batkhuyagiin Khulan (MGL)	2
Pang Qianyu (CHN)	6^{F}

== Final standing ==
Rank	Athlete
1st place, gold medalist(s)	Akari Fujinami (JPN)
2nd place, silver medalist(s)	Lucía Yépez (ECU)
3rd place, bronze medalist(s)	Choe Hyo-gyong (PRK)
3rd place, bronze medalist(s)	Pang Qianyu (CHN)
5	Annika Wendle (GER)
5	Batkhuyagiin Khulan (MGL)
7	Jonna Malmgren (SWE)
8	Zeynep Yetgil (TUR)
9	Andreea Ana (ROU)
10	Maria Prevolaraki (GRE)
11	Dominique Parrish (USA)
12	Betzabeth Argüello (VEN)
13	Christianah Ogunsanya (NGR)
14	Mariana Drăguțan (MDA)
15	Antim Panghal (IND)
16	Mia-Lahnee Aquino (GUM)
