= 2021 U23 World Wrestling Championships – Women's freestyle 53 kg =

The women's freestyle 53 kilograms is a competition featured at the 2021 U23 World Wrestling Championships, and was held in Belgrade, Serbia on 4 and 5 November.

== Medalists ==
Gold	Lucía Yépez; Ecuador
Silver	Ekaterina Verbina; Russia
Bronze	Zeynep Yetgil; Turkey
Bronze	Mariia Vynnyk; Ukraine

== Results ==
Legend

- F — Won by fall
- WO — Won by walkover

=== Main bracket ===
Round of 16
~~Emma Wangila (KEN)~~
Mönkhbatyn Mönkhgerel (MGL)	WO
Ekaterina Verbina (RUS)	10
Tatyana Varansova (AZE)	0
Lucía Yépez (ECU)	10
Taylor McPherson (CAN)	0
Hsieh Meng-hsuan (TPE)	6
Mariana Drăguțan (MDA)	7
Ronna Heaton (USA)	6^{F}
Ellada Makhyaddinova (KAZ)	1
Mariia Vynnyk (UKR)	14
Szimonetta Szekér (HUN)	0

Quarterfinals
Zeynep Yetgil (TUR)	4^{F}
Carmen Di Dio (ITA)	0
Mönkhbatyn Mönkhgerel (MGL)	0
Ekaterina Verbina (RUS)	10
Lucía Yépez (ECU)	10
Mariana Drăguțan (MDA)	0
Ronna Heaton (USA)	1
Mariia Vynnyk (UKR)	6

Semifinals
Zeynep Yetgil (TUR)	1
Ekaterina Verbina (RUS)	8
Lucía Yépez (ECU)	9
Mariia Vynnyk (UKR)	7

Final
Ekaterina Verbina (RUS)	0
Lucía Yépez (ECU)	4^{F}

=== Repechage ===
Repechage round
Tatyana Varansova (AZE)	6
Mönkhbatyn Mönkhgerel (MGL)	4^{F}
Taylor McPherson (CAN)	0
Mariana Drăguțan (MDA)	10

Bronze medals
Mönkhbatyn Mönkhgerel (MGL)	3
Zeynep Yetgil (TUR)	8
Mariana Drăguțan (MDA)	6
Mariia Vynnyk (UKR)	9
