= Wrestling at the 2018 Asian Games – Women's freestyle 53 kg =

Women's freestyle 53 kg at the 2018 Asian Games
- Venue: Jakarta Convention Center
- Date: 20 August 2018
- Competitors: 13 from 13 nations

Medalists
gold medal	Pak Yong-mi	North Korea
silver medal	Zhuldyz Eshimova	Kazakhstan
bronze medal	Haruna Okuno	Japan
bronze medal	Erdenechimegiin Sumiyaa	Mongolia

The women's freestyle 53 kilograms wrestling competition at the 2018 Asian Games in Jakarta was held on 20 August 2018 at the Jakarta Convention Center Assembly Hall.

== Schedule ==
All times are Western Indonesia Time (UTC+07:00)

Date	Time	Event
Monday, 20 August 2018	13:00	1/8 finals
Monday, 20 August 2018	13:00	Quarterfinals
Monday, 20 August 2018	13:00	Semifinals
Monday, 20 August 2018	13:00	Repechages
Monday, 20 August 2018	19:00	Finals

== Results ==
Legend

- F — Won by fall

=== Main bracket ===
1/8 finals
Haruna Okuno (JPN)	10
Sevara Eshmuratova (UZB)	0
Dewi Ulfah (INA)	3
Phạm Thị Hà Phương (VIE)	5
Erdenechimegiin Sumiyaa (MGL)	10
Pinki (IND)	0
Chey Chan Raksmey (CAM)	4
Jantima Virangsa (THA)	7
Zhuldyz Eshimova (KAZ)	11
Lee Shin-hye (KOR)	6

Quarterfinals
Chiu Hsin-ju (TPE)	0
Pak Yong-mi (PRK)	6
Pang Qianyu (CHN)	1
Haruna Okuno (JPN)	4
Phạm Thị Hà Phương (VIE)	2
Erdenechimegiin Sumiyaa (MGL)	12
Jantima Virangsa (THA)	0
Zhuldyz Eshimova (KAZ)	10

Semifinals
Pak Yong-mi (PRK)	7
Haruna Okuno (JPN)	7
Erdenechimegiin Sumiyaa (MGL)	11
Zhuldyz Eshimova (KAZ)	12

Final
Pak Yong-mi (PRK)	11
Zhuldyz Eshimova (KAZ)	0

=== Repechage ===
Repechage round 1
Lee Shin-hye (KOR)	8
Jantima Virangsa (THA)	0

Bronze medals
Chiu Hsin-ju (TPE)	0
Haruna Okuno (JPN)	6^{F}
Lee Shin-hye (KOR)	2
Erdenechimegiin Sumiyaa (MGL)	3^{F}

== Final standing ==
Rank	Athlete
1st place, gold medalist(s)	Pak Yong-mi (PRK)
2nd place, silver medalist(s)	Zhuldyz Eshimova (KAZ)
3rd place, bronze medalist(s)	Haruna Okuno (JPN)
3rd place, bronze medalist(s)	Erdenechimegiin Sumiyaa (MGL)
5	Chiu Hsin-ju (TPE)
5	Lee Shin-hye (KOR)
7	Phạm Thị Hà Phương (VIE)
8	Jantima Virangsa (THA)
9	Chey Chan Raksmey (CAM)
10	Dewi Ulfah (INA)
11	Pang Qianyu (CHN)
12	Sevara Eshmuratova (UZB)
12	Pinki (IND)
