= Wrestling at the 2020 Summer Olympics – Women's freestyle 53 kg =

Women's freestyle 53 kg at the Games of the XXXII Olympiad
- Venue: Makuhari Messe
- Date: 5–6 August 2021
- Competitors: 16 from 16 nations

Medalists
1st place, gold medalist(s)		Mayu Mukaida	Japan
2nd place, silver medalist(s)		Pang Qianyu	China
3rd place, bronze medalist(s)		Vanesa Kaladzinskaya	Belarus
3rd place, bronze medalist(s)		Bat-Ochiryn Bolortuyaa	Mongolia

The women's freestyle 53 kilograms competition at the 2020 Summer Olympics in Tokyo, Japan, took place on 5–6 August 2021 at the Makuhari Messe in Mihama-ku.

This freestyle wrestling competition consists of a single-elimination tournament, with a repechage used to determine the winner of two bronze medals. The two finalists face off for gold and silver medals. Each wrestler who loses to one of the two finalists moves into the repechage, culminating in a pair of bronze medal matches featuring the semifinal losers each facing the remaining repechage opponent from their half of the bracket.

The medals for the competition were presented by Battushig Batbold, IOC Member; Mongolia, and the medalists' bouquets were presented by Zhang Xia, UWW Board Member; China.

== Schedule ==
All times are Japan Standard Time (UTC+09:00)

Date	Time	Event
5 August 2021	11:00	Qualification rounds
5 August 2021	18:15	Semifinals
6 August 2021	11:00	Repechage
6 August 2021	19:30	Finals

== Results ==
Legend

- F — Won by fall

=== Main bracket ===
1/8 finals
Vinesh Phogat (IND)	7
Sofia Mattsson (SWE)	1
Vanesa Kaladzinskaya (BLR)	10
Andreea Ana (ROU)	0
Olga Khoroshavtseva (ROC)	4
Jacarra Winchester (USA)	7
Laura Herin (CUB)	0
Pang Qianyu (CHN)	2
Luisa Valverde (ECU)	11
Maria Prevolaraki (GRE)	4
Bat-Ochiryn Bolortuyaa (MGL)	4^{F}
Rckaela Aquino (GUM)	0
Tatyana Akhmetova-Amanzhol (KAZ)	2
Roksana Zasina (POL)	3
Joseph Essombe (CMR)	0
Mayu Mukaida (JPN)	10

1/4 finals
Vinesh Phogat (IND)	3
Vanesa Kaladzinskaya (BLR)	9^{F}
Jacarra Winchester (USA)	2
Pang Qianyu (CHN)	6
Luisa Valverde (ECU)	5
Bat-Ochiryn Bolortuyaa (MGL)	15
Roksana Zasina (POL)	2
Mayu Mukaida (JPN)	12

Semifinals
Vanesa Kaladzinskaya (BLR)	2
Pang Qianyu (CHN)	2
Bat-Ochiryn Bolortuyaa (MGL)	3
Mayu Mukaida (JPN)	6

Final
Pang Qianyu (CHN)	4
Mayu Mukaida (JPN)	5

=== Repechage ===
Repechage
Laura Herin (CUB)	0
Jacarra Winchester (USA)	5
Joseph Essombe (CMR)	4
Roksana Zasina (POL)	4

Bronze medal matches
Jacarra Winchester (USA)	0
Vanesa Kaladzinskaya (BLR)	4^{F}
Joseph Essombe (CMR)	4
Bat-Ochiryn Bolortuyaa (MGL)	14

== Final standing ==
Rank	Athlete
1st place, gold medalist(s)	Mayu Mukaida (JPN)
2nd place, silver medalist(s)	Pang Qianyu (CHN)
3rd place, bronze medalist(s)	Vanesa Kaladzinskaya (BLR)
3rd place, bronze medalist(s)	Bat-Ochiryn Bolortuyaa (MGL)
5	Jacarra Winchester (USA)
5	Joseph Essombe (CMR)
7	Roksana Zasina (POL)
8	Luisa Valverde (ECU)
9	Vinesh Phogat (IND)
10	Olga Khoroshavtseva (ROC)
11	Maria Prevolaraki (GRE)
12	Tatyana Akhmetova-Amanzhol (KAZ)
13	Sofia Mattsson (SWE)
14	Rckaela Aquino (GUM)
15	Laura Herin (CUB)
16	Andreea Ana (ROU)
