= Akari Fujinami =

Japanese freestyle wrestler (born 2003)

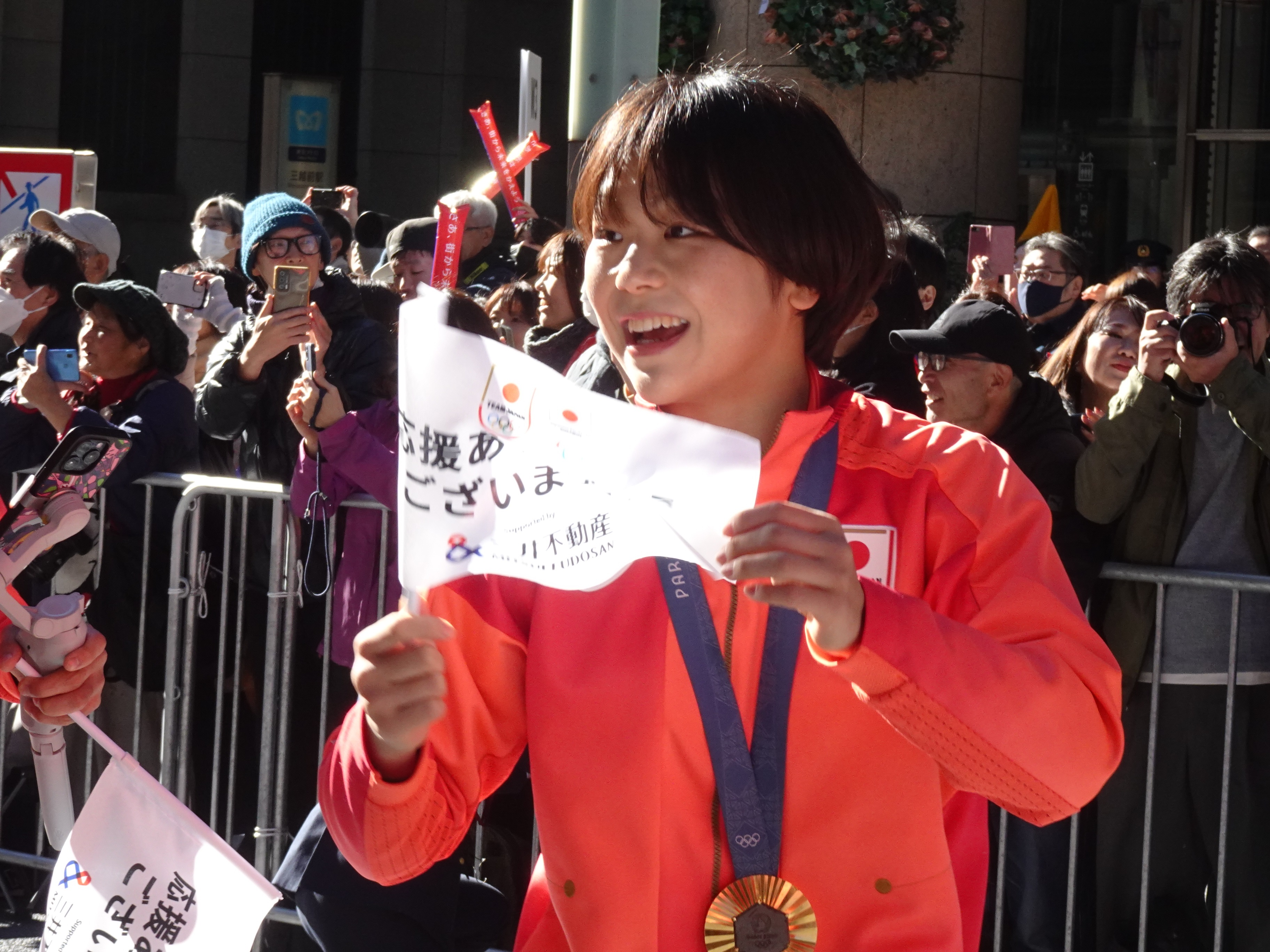
- Fujinami in 2024

Personal information
- Native name: 藤波朱理
- Born: 11 November 2003 (age 23) Yokkaichi, Japan
- Height: 1.64 m (5 ft 5 in)
- Relative: Yuhi Fujinami (brother)

Sport
- Sport: Wrestling
- Weight class: 53 kg
- Event: Freestyle
Medal record
Women's freestyle wrestling
Representing Japan
Olympic Games
Gold medal – first place	2024 Paris	53kg
World Championships
Gold medal – first place	2021 Oslo	53kg
Gold medal – first place	2023 Belgrade	53kg
Asian Games
Gold medal – first place	2022 Hangzhou	53kg
Bronze medal – third place	2026 Aichi–Nagoya	57kg
Asian Championships
Gold medal – first place	2022 Ulaanbaatar	53kg
Gold medal – first place	2023 Astana	53kg
Grand Prix
Gold medal – first place	2023 Zagreb	53kg
Gold medal – first place	2023 Sofia	55kg
U23 World Championships
Gold medal – first place	2025 Novi Sad	57kg
U17 World Championships
Gold medal – first place	2018 Zagreb	49kg
U17 Asian Championships
Gold medal – first place	2018 Tashkent	49kg

Akari Fujinami (Japanese: 藤波朱理; born 11 November 2003) is a Japanese freestyle wrestler. She won the gold medal in the women's 53 kg event at the 2024 Paris Olympics. She won 155 straight national and international bouts after her loss at the National Junior High School Wrestling Championships in 2017. Her streak ended at the 2026 Asian Games after being pinned by Il Sim Son.

== Career ==
Fujinami won the gold medal in the women's 53 kg event at the 2021 World Wrestling Championships held in Oslo, Norway. She also won the gold medal in her event at the 2022 Asian Wrestling Championships held in Ulaanbaatar, Mongolia.

Fujinami won the gold medal in the women's 55 kg event at the 2023 Dan Kolov & Nikola Petrov Tournament held in Sofia, Bulgaria. She also won the gold medal in the women's 53 kg event at the 2022 Asian Games held in Hangzhou, China. She defeated Pang Qianyu of China in her gold medal match.

In 2024, Fujinami won the gold medal in the women's 53 kg event at the Summer Olympics in Paris, France. She defeated Lucía Yépez of Ecuador in her gold medal match.

In 2026, Fujinami's 155-match win streak ended at the 2026 Asian Games when she trailed 0–10 against Il Sim Son and was eventually pinned, suffering her first international loss.

== Awards ==
- Women's Wrestling Hall of Fame
  - WWHOF Award (1 time)
    - Amateur Wrestler of the Year (2025)
