= Pang Qianyu =

Chinese freestyle wrestler

Personal information
- Born: 13 November 1996 (age 29) Shaoshan, China
- Height: 156 cm (5 ft 1 in)

Sport
- Country: China
- Sport: Amateur wrestling
- Weight class: 53 kg
- Event: Freestyle
Medal record
Women's freestyle wrestling
Representing China
Olympic Games
Silver medal – second place	2020 Tokyo	53 kg
Bronze medal – third place	2024 Paris	53 kg
World Championships
Bronze medal – third place	2018 Budapest	53 kg
Bronze medal – third place	2019 Nur-Sultan	53 kg
Asian Games
Silver medal – second place	2022 Hangzhou	53 kg
Asian Championships
Gold medal – first place	2016 Bangkok	53 kg
Gold medal – first place	2023 Astana	55 kg

Pang Qianyu (born 13 November 1996) is a Chinese freestyle wrestler. She won the silver medal in the 53 kg event at the 2020 Summer Olympics held in Tokyo, Japan. She won a bronze medal in the women's 53 kg event at the 2018 World Wrestling Championships and again in the women's 53 kg event at the 2019 World Wrestling Championships.

== Career ==
At the 2016 Asian Wrestling Championships held in Bangkok, Thailand, she won the gold medal in the women's 53 kg event.

She competed in the women's 53 kg event at the 2018 Asian Games held in Jakarta, Indonesia without winning a medal. She was eliminated in her first match by Haruna Okuno of Japan.

Pang won the silver medal in the women's 53 kg event at the 2022 Asian Games held in Hangzhou, China. In the final, she lost against Akari Fujinami of Japan.

She competed at the 2024 Asian Wrestling Olympic Qualification Tournament in Bishkek, Kyrgyzstan and she earned a quota place for China for the 2024 Summer Olympics in Paris, France. Pang won one of the bronze medals in the women's 53 kg event at the 2024 Summer Olympics. She defeated Batkhuyagiin Khulan of Mongolia in her bronze medal match.

== Achievements ==
Year	Tournament	Location	Result	Event
2016	Asian Championships	Bangkok, Thailand	1st	Freestyle 53 kg
2018	World Championships	Budapest, Hungary	3rd	Freestyle 53 kg
2019	World Championships	Nur-Sultan, Kazakhstan	3rd	Freestyle 53 kg
2021	Summer Olympics	Tokyo, Japan	2nd	Freestyle 53 kg
2023	Asian Championships	Astana, Kazakhstan	1st	Freestyle 55 kg
2023	Asian Games	Hangzhou, China	2nd	Freestyle 53 kg
2024	Summer Olympics	Paris, France	3rd	Freestyle 53 kg
