= Haruna Murayama =

Japanese freestyle wrestler

Haruna Murayama 奥野春菜
Personal information
- Native name: 奥野春菜
- Nationality: Japanese
- Born: March 18, 1999 (age 27) Mie Prefecture, Japan
- Height: 158 cm (5 ft 2 in)
- Weight: 53 kg (117 lb)

Sport
- Country: Japan
- Sport: Wrestling
- Event: Freestyle
- College team: Shigakkan University
- Club: Shigakkan University
Medal record
Women's freestyle wrestling
Representing Japan
World Championships
Gold medal – first place	2017 Paris	55 kg
Gold medal – first place	2018 Budapest	53 kg
Gold medal – first place	2023 Belgrade	55 kg
Gold medal – first place	2025 Zagreb	53 kg
Asian Championships
Bronze medal – third place	2025 Amman	55 kg
Asian Games
Bronze medal – third place	2018 Jakarta	53 kg
Grand Prix
Gold medal – first place	2025 Tirana	55 kg
World U23 Championships
Gold medal – first place	2017 Bydgoszcz	55 kg
Gold medal – first place	2022 Pontevedra	53 kg
World Juniors Championships
Gold medal – first place	2019 Tallinn	53 kg

Haruna Murayama (村山春菜, Murayama Haruna; née Okuno (奥野), born 18 March 1999) is a Japanese freestyle wrestler. In 2017, she won a gold medal at Paris World Wrestling Championships in 55 kg, later adding to that a gold each in the same weight division at the 2018 and 2023 World Wrestling Championships.

== Awards ==
- Tokyo Sports
  - Wrestling Special Award (2017)
