= Lucía Yépez =

Ecuadoran wrestler (born 2001)

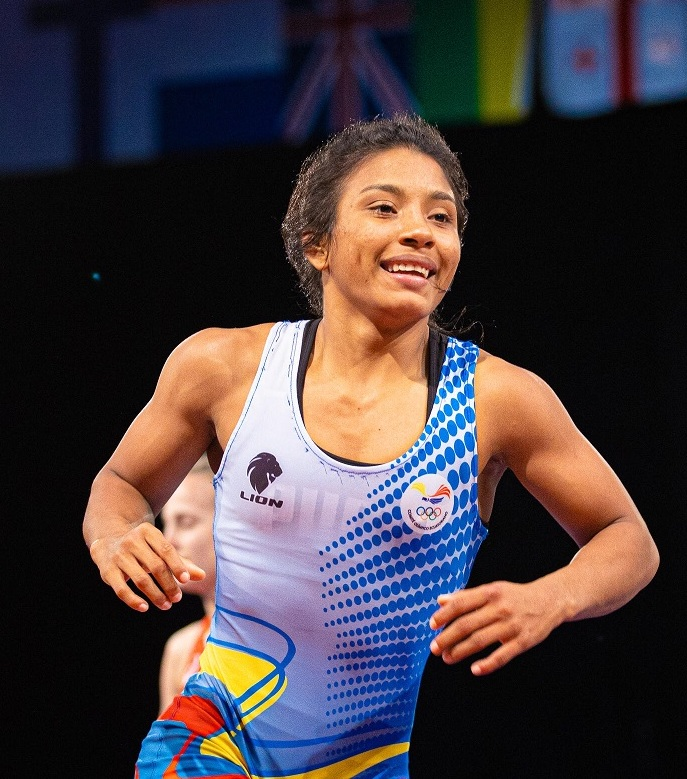
- Yépez in 2021

Personal information
- Full name: Lucía Yamileth Yépez Guzmán
- Nickname: La Tigra
- Born: 18 February 2001 (age 25) Mocache, Mocache Canton, Los Ríos Province, Ecuador

Sport
- Country: Ecuador
- Sport: Amateur wrestling
- Weight class: 53 kg; 55 kg
- Event: Freestyle
Medal record
Women's freestyle wrestling
Representing Ecuador
Olympic Games
Silver medal – second place	2024 Paris	53 kg
World Championships
Silver medal – second place	2025 Zagreb	53 kg
Silver medal – second place	2026 Astana	53 kg
Bronze medal – third place	2023 Belgrade	53 kg
Pan American Games
Gold medal – first place	2023 Santiago	53 kg
Pan American Championships
Gold medal – first place	2023 Buenos Aires	53 kg
Gold medal – first place	2024 Acapulco	53 kg
Gold medal – first place	2025 Monterrey	53 kg
Gold medal – first place	2026 Coralville	53 kg
Bronze medal – third place	2022 Acapulco	55 kg
South American Games
Gold medal – first place	2022 Asunción	53 kg
Bolivarian Games
Gold medal – first place	2022 Valledupar	53 kg
Gold medal – first place	2025 Lima-Ayacucho	53 kg
World U23 Championships
Gold medal – first place	2021 Belgrade	53 kg
Silver medal – second place	2022 Pontevedra	53 kg
Junior Pan American Games
Gold medal – first place	2021 Cali-Valle	50 kg

Lucía Yamileth Yépez Guzmán (Note: In this Spanish name, the first or paternal surname is Yépez and the second or maternal family name is Guzmán.) (born 18 February 2001) is an Ecuadorian freestyle wrestler.

She is an Olympic silver medalist (2024), World Wrestling Championships silver medalist (2025, 2026), winner of the Pan American Games (2023), and four-time winner of the Pan American Wrestling Championships (2023, 2024, 2025, 2026).

== Career ==
She won the gold medal in the 53 kg event at the 2021 U23 World Wrestling Championships held in Belgrade, Serbia.

Yépez competed for Ecuador at the 2020 Summer Olympics in Tokyo, Japan. A few months later, she won the gold medal in the women's 50 kg event at the 2021 Junior Pan American Games held in Cali, Colombia.

Yépez won the gold medal in her event at the 2022 Bolivarian Games held in Valledupar, Colombia. She competed in the 53 kg event at the 2022 World Wrestling Championships held in Belgrade, Serbia. She won the gold medal in her event at the 2022 South American Games held in Asunción, Paraguay.

Yépez won the gold medal in her event at the 2023 Ibrahim Moustafa Tournament held in Alexandria, Egypt. A few months later, she also won the gold medal in her event at the 2023 Pan American Wrestling Championships held in Buenos Aires, Argentina.

In September 2023, Yépez won one of the bronze medals in the women's 53 kg event at the World Wrestling Championships held in Belgrade, Serbia. In November 2023, she won the gold medal in the women's 53 kg event at the 2023 Pan American Games held in Santiago, Chile. She defeated Laura Herin of Cuba in her gold medal match.

In February 2024, Yépez won the gold medal in her event at the Pan American Wrestling Championships held in Acapulco, Mexico. She defeated Betzabeth Argüello of Venezuela in her gold medal match. In August 2024, Yépez won the silver medal in the women's 53 kg event at the Summer Olympics in Paris, France.

She debuted for Real American Freestyle (RAF) on 28 February 2026 at RAF 06, defeating Everest Leydecker.

Yépez defeated Cameron Guerin at RAF 09 on 30 May 2026.

She challenged Kendra Ryan for the interim RAF Women's Strawweight Championship at RAF 10 on 13 June 2026. She won the championship by 12-2 Technical Fall. She was promoted to undisputed champion and defeated Felicity Taylor on 18 July 2026, at RAF 11 by technical fall.

== Achievements ==
Year	Tournament	Location	Result	Event
2022	Pan American Wrestling Championships	Acapulco, Mexico	3rd	Freestyle 55 kg
2022	Bolivarian Games	Valledupar, Colombia	1st	Freestyle 53 kg
2022	South American Games	Asunción, Paraguay	1st	Freestyle 53 kg
2023	Pan American Wrestling Championships	Buenos Aires, Argentina	1st	Freestyle 53 kg
2023	World Championships	Belgrade, Serbia	3rd	Freestyle 53 kg
2023	Pan American Games	Santiago, Chile	1st	Freestyle 53 kg
2024	Pan American Wrestling Championships	Acapulco, Mexico	1st	Freestyle 53 kg
2024	Olympic Games	Paris, France	2nd	Freestyle 53 kg
2025	Pan American Wrestling Championships	Monterrey, Mexico	1st	Freestyle 53 kg
2025	World Championships	Zagreb, Croatia	2nd	Freestyle 53 kg
2025	Bolivarian Games	Lima and Ayacucho, Peru	1st	Freestyle 53 kg
2026	Pan American Wrestling Championships	Coralville, Iowa, United States	1st	Freestyle 53 kg
