= Bhagana, Hisar =

Bhagana (Hisar)
- Location in Haryana Bhagana (Hisar) (India)
- Coordinates: 29.069596°N 75.851943°E
- Country: India
- State: Haryana
- District: Hisar district
- Municipality: Hissar, Haryana

Population (2011)
  - Total: 5,198
- Postal code: 125044
- ISO 3166 code: IN-HR
- Website: www.hisar.nic.in

Bhagana is a village in Hisar Tehsil in Hisar district, Haryana, India.

== Demographics ==
As of 2011 India census, Bhagana (Hisar) had a population of 5198 in 1047 households. Males (2765) constitute 53.19% of the population and females (2433) 46.8%. Bhagana has an average literacy (3079) rate of 59.23%, less than the national average of 74%: male literacy (1897) is 61.61%, and female literacy (1182) is 38.38% of total literates (3079). In Bhagana (Hisar) 13.28% of the population is under 6 years of age (596).
