= Dominique Parrish =

American freestyle wrestler (born 1996)

Personal information
- Full name: Dominique Olivia Parrish
- Born: November 5, 1996 (age 29) Scotts Valley, California, U.S.
- Education: Simon Fraser University

Sport
- Country: United States
- Sport: Amateur wrestling
- Weight class: 53 kg; 55 kg
- Event: Freestyle
- University team: Simon Fraser Red Leafs
- Club: Sunkist Kids Wrestling Club
Medal record
Women's freestyle wrestling
Representing the United States
World Championships
Gold medal – first place	2022 Belgrade	53 kg
Pan American Championships
Gold medal – first place	2022 Acapulco	53 kg
Yasar Dogu Tournament
Bronze medal – third place	2022 Istanbul	53 kg

Dominique Olivia Parrish (born November 5, 1996) is an American freestyle wrestler. She won the gold medal in the women's 53 kg event at the 2022 World Wrestling Championships held in Belgrade, Serbia. She also won the gold medal in her event at the 2022 Pan American Wrestling Championships held in Acapulco, Mexico. Parrish represented the United States at the 2024 Summer Olympics in Paris, France.

== Career ==
In 2022, Parrish won one of the bronze medals in the women's 53 kg event at the Yasar Dogu Tournament held in Istanbul, Turkey. She competed at the 2022 Tunis Ranking Series event held in Tunis, Tunisia.

Parrish lost her bronze medal match in her event at the 2023 Pan American Wrestling Championships held in Buenos Aires, Argentina. She was eliminated in her first match in the women's 53 kg event at the 2023 World Wrestling Championships held in Belgrade, Serbia.

In January 2024, Parrish lost her bronze medal match in her event at the Grand Prix Zagreb Open held in Zagreb, Croatia. In February 2024, at the Pan American Wrestling Olympic Qualification Tournament held in Acapulco, Mexico, she earned a quota place for the United States for the 2024 Summer Olympics held in Paris, France. Parrish qualified for the Olympics at the 2024 United States Olympic trials held in State College, Pennsylvania.

In August 2024, Parrish competed in the women's 53 kg event at the Olympics. She lost her first match against eventual gold medalist Akari Fujinami of Japan and she was eliminated in the repechage by Batkhuyagiin Khulan of Mongolia.

== Achievements ==
Year	Tournament	Location	Result	Event
2022	Pan American Wrestling Championships	Acapulco, Mexico	1st	Freestyle 53 kg
2022	World Championships	Belgrade, Serbia	1st	Freestyle 53 kg
