= Bat-Ochiryn Bolortuyaa =

Mongolian freestyle wrestler

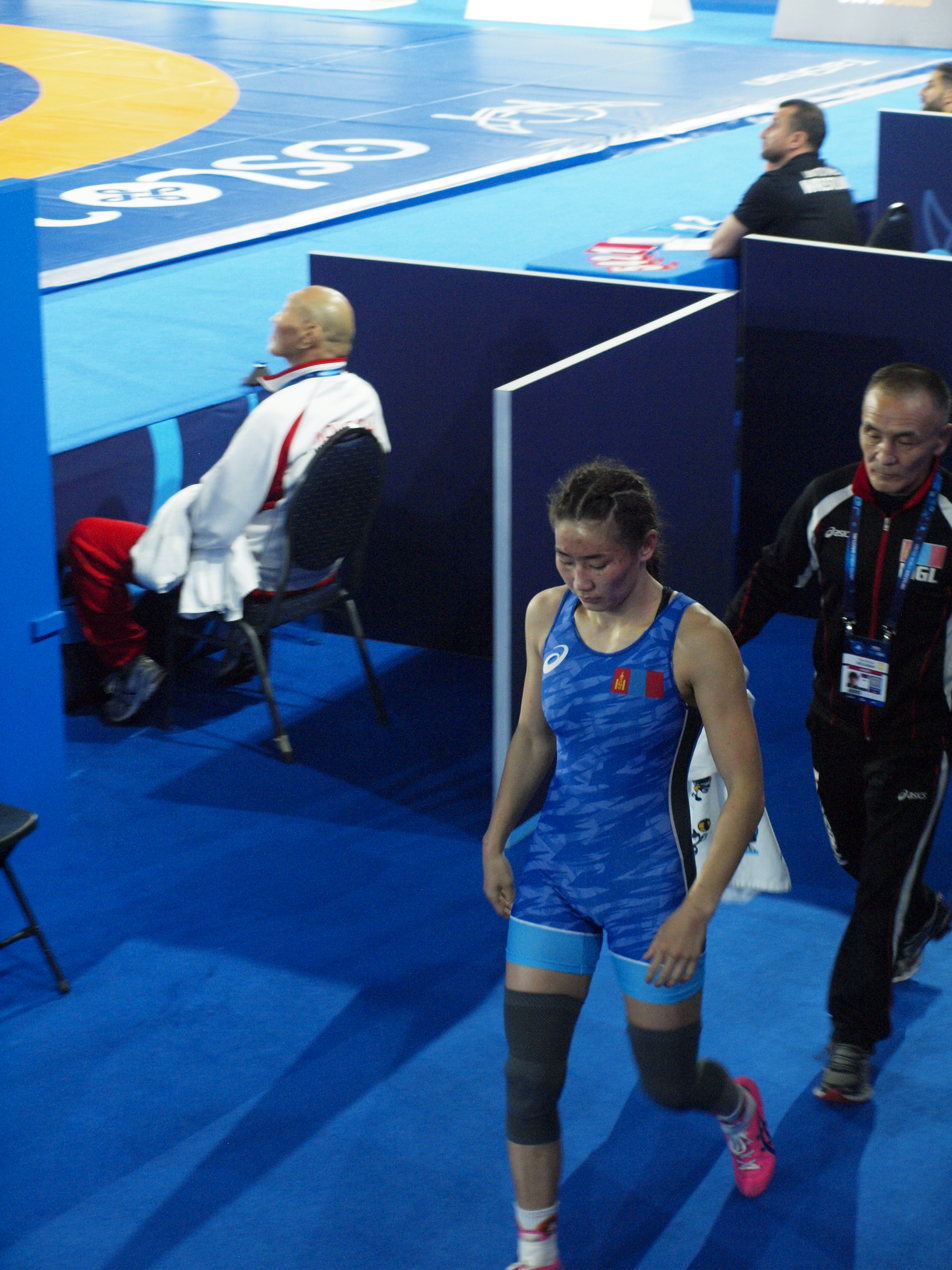
- Bolortuyaa at the 2021 World Championships

Personal information
- Native name: Бат-Очирын Болортуяа
- Nationality: Mongolia
- Born: 15 May 1997 (age 29) Bulgan, Khovd, Mongolia
- Education: Mongolian State University of Education
- Height: 162 cm (5 ft 4 in)

Sport
- Country: Mongolia
- Sport: Amateur wrestling
- Weight class: 53–55 kg
- Event: Freestyle
- Club: Jenko Mongolia Ulaanbaatar

Achievements and titles
- Olympic finals: (bronze) (2020)
- World finals: (bronze) (2019)
- Regional finals: (bronze) (2023)
Medal record
Women's freestyle wrestling
Representing Mongolia
Olympic Games
Bronze medal – third place	2020 Tokyo	53 kg
World Championships
Bronze medal – third place	2019 Nur-Sultan	55 kg
World Cup
Bronze medal – third place	2022 Coralville	Team
Asian Championships
Bronze medal – third place	2023 Astana	53 kg
Olympic Qualification Tournament
Gold medal – first place	2021 Almaty	53 kg
Golden Grand Prix Ivan Yarygin
Gold medal – first place	2022 Krasnoyarsk	53 kg
Bronze medal – third place	2020 Krasnoyarsk	53 kg
Bronze medal – third place	2019 Krasnoyarsk	55 kg
Yasar Dogu Tournament
Gold medal – first place	2022 Istanbul	53 kg
Gold medal – first place	2024 Antalya	53 kg
Bolat Turlykhanov Cup
Gold medal – first place	2022 Almaty	53 kg
Polyák Imre & Varga János Memorial Tournament
Gold medal – first place	2023 Budapest	53 kg
Grand Prix Zagreb Open
Silver medal – second place	2023 Zagreb	53 kg
Kaba Uulu Kozhomkul & Raatbek Sanatbaev Tournament
Bronze medal – third place	2023 Bishkek	53 kg
Asian U23 Championship
Bronze medal – third place	2019 Ulaanbaatar	55 kg

Bat-Ochiryn Bolortuyaa (Mongolian: Бат-Очирын Болортуяа; born 15 May 1997) is a Mongolian freestyle wrestler. She won one of the bronze medals in the women's 53 kg event at the 2020 Summer Olympics held in Tokyo, Japan. She is a bronze medalist at the World Wrestling Championships. She is also a gold and two-time bronze medalist at the Golden Grand Prix Ivan Yarygin held in Krasnoyarsk, Russia.

== Career ==
She won the bronze medal in the 55 kg event at the 2019 Asian U23 Wrestling Championship held in Ulaanbaatar, Mongolia. At the 2019 World Wrestling Championships held in Nur-Sultan, Kazakhstan, she won one of the bronze medals in the women's 55 kg event.

She represented Mongolia at the 2020 Summer Olympics in Tokyo, Japan. In October 2021, she was eliminated in her first match in the women's 53 kg event at the World Wrestling Championships held in Oslo, Norway.

In 2022, she won the gold medal in the women's 53 kg event at the Golden Grand Prix Ivan Yarygin held in Krasnoyarsk, Russia. She also won the gold medal in the women's 53 kg event at the Yasar Dogu Tournament held in Istanbul, Turkey.

== Achievements ==
Year	Tournament	Location	Result	Event
2019	World Championships	Nur-Sultan, Kazakhstan	3rd	Freestyle 55 kg
2021	Summer Olympics	Tokyo, Japan	3rd	Freestyle 53 kg
2021	World Championships	Oslo, Norway	11th	Freestyle 53 kg
