= Diana Weicker =

Canadian freestyle wrestler

Personal information
- Nationality: Canadian
- Born: Diana Mary Helen Weicker; 26 May 1989 (age 37)

Sport
- Sport: Wrestling
Medal record
Women's freestyle wrestling
Representing Canada
World Wrestling Championships
Bronze medal – third place	2018 Budapest	53 kg
Pan American Championships
Gold medal – first place	2023 Buenos Aires	55 kg
Bronze medal – third place	2019 Buenos Aires	53 kg
Commonwealth Games
Gold medal – first place	2018 Gold Coast	Freestyle 53 kg

Diana Weicker (born 26 May 1989) is a Canadian freestyle wrestler. She competed in the women's freestyle 53 kg event at the 2018 Commonwealth Games, winning the gold medal. In 2021, she won the silver medal in the 53 kg event at the Matteo Pellicone Ranking Series 2021 held in Rome, Italy.
