= Betzabeth Argüello =

Venezuelan freestyle wrestler

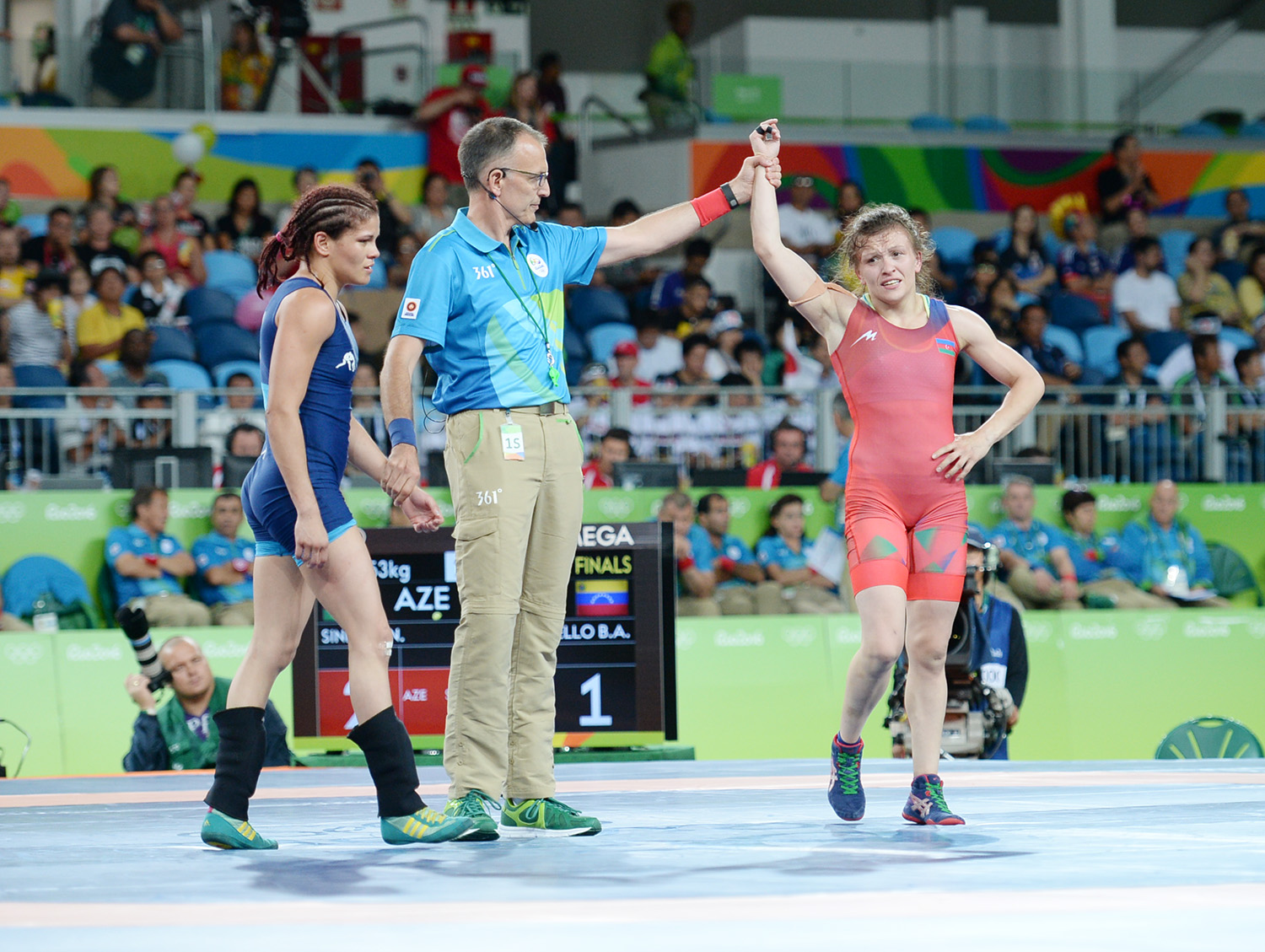
- Argüello (left) against Synyshyn during the 2016 Olympics

Personal information
- Full name: Betzabeth Angélica Argüello Villegas
- Born: 28 January 1991 (age 35) Venezuela

Sport
- Sport: Wrestling
- Weight class: 53 kg
- Event: Freestyle
Medal record
Women's freestyle wrestling
Representing Venezuela
Pan American Games
Silver medal – second place	2019 Lima	53 kg
Bronze medal – third place	2015 Toronto	53 kg
Bronze medal – third place	2023 Santiago	53 kg
Bolivarian Games
Gold medal – first place	2017 Santa Marta	53 kg
Silver medal – second place	2022 Valledupar	53 kg

Betzabeth Angélica Argüello Villegas (Note: In this Spanish name, the first or paternal surname is Argüello and the second or maternal family name is Villegas.) (born 28 January 1991) is a Venezuelan freestyle wrestler. She competed in the women's freestyle 53 kg event at the 2016 Summer Olympics, in which she lost the bronze medal match to Nataliya Synyshyn.

== Career ==
Argüello won the gold medal in her event at the 2017 Bolivarian Games held in Santa Marta, Colombia.

Argüello won one of the bronze medals in her event at the 2022 Pan American Wrestling Championships held in Acapulco, Mexico. She won the silver medal in her event at the 2022 Bolivarian Games held in Valledupar, Colombia. She won one of the bronze medals in her event at the 2022 South American Games held in Asunción, Paraguay.

Argüello won the silver medal in her event at the 2023 Pan American Wrestling Championships held in Buenos Aires, Argentina. She won one of the bronze medals in the women's 53 kg event at the 2023 Pan American Games held in Santiago, Chile.

In 2024, Argüello won the silver medal in her event at the Pan American Wrestling Championships held in Acapulco, Mexico. A few days later, at the Pan American Wrestling Olympic Qualification Tournament held in Acapulco, Mexico, she earned a quota place for Venezuela for the 2024 Summer Olympics held in Paris, France. She competed in the women's 53 kg event at the Olympics. She was eliminated in her first match by Jonna Malmgren of Sweden.

== Achievements ==
- Central American and Caribbean Games 2014 — ; 3rd
- South American Games 2014 — ; 2nd
- Pan American Wrestling Championships 2015 — ; 3rd
- Pan American Games 2015 — ; 3rd
- Pan American Wrestling Championships 2016 — ; 3rd
- Bolivarian Games 2017 — ; 1st
- Pan American Wrestling Championships 2018 — ; 3rd
- Central American and Caribbean Games 2018 — ; 1st
- South American Games 2018 — ; 2nd
- Pan American Games 2019 — ; 2nd
- Pan American Wrestling Championships 2022 — ; 3rd
- Bolivarian Games 2022 — ; 2nd
- South American Games 2022 — ; 3rd
- Pan American Wrestling Championships 2023 — ; 2nd
- Central American and Caribbean Games 2023 — ; 3rd
- Pan American Games 2023 — ; 3rd
- Pan American Wrestling Championships 2024 — ; 2nd
