= 2019 European Wrestling Championships – Women's freestyle 53 kg =

The women's freestyle 53 kg is a competition featured at the 2019 European Wrestling Championships, and was held in Bucharest, Romania on April 11 and April 12.

== Medalists ==
Gold	Stalvira Orshush; Russia
Silver	Lilya Horishna; Ukraine
Bronze	Jessica Blaszka; Netherlands
Bronze	Vanesa Kaladzinskaya; Belarus

== Results ==
Legend

- F — Won by fall

=== Final ===
Final
Lilya Horishna (UKR)	3
Stalvira Orshush (RUS)	13

=== Top half ===
Round of 32

Round of 16
Tatiana Debien (FRA)	0
Lilya Horishna (UKR)	5^{F}
Marina Rueda (ESP)	8
Silje Kippernes (NOR)	14
Annika Wendle (GER)	0
Jessica Blaszka (NED)	10
Mercédesz Dénes (HUN)	3
Iulia Leorda (MDA)	3

Quarterfinals
Lilya Horishna (UKR)	2^{F}
Silje Kippernes (NOR)	0
Jessica Blaszka (NED)	4
Mercédesz Dénes (HUN)	2

Semifinals
Lilya Horishna (UKR)	6
Jessica Blaszka (NED)	1

=== Bottom half ===
Round of 32
Stalvira Orshush (RUS)	2
Roksana Zasina (POL)	2

Round of 16
Vanesa Kaladzinskaya (BLR)	10
Tatyana Varansova (AZE)	0
Maria Prevolaraki (GRE)	0
Sofia Mattsson (SWE)	2^{F}
Suzanna Şeicariu (ROU)	2
Zeynep Yetgil (TUR)	8
Florine Schedler (AUT)	1
Stalvira Orshush (RUS)	4^{F}

Quarterfinals
Vanesa Kaladzinskaya (BLR)	6
Sofia Mattsson (SWE)	2
Zeynep Yetgil (TUR)	0
Stalvira Orshush (RUS)	11

Semifinals
Vanesa Kaladzinskaya (BLR)	2
Stalvira Orshush (RUS)	2

=== Repechage ===
Repechage round 1
Roksana Zasina (POL)	10
Florine Schedler (AUT)	0

Repechage round 2
Tatiana Debien (FRA)	7
Silje Kippernes (NOR)	5
Roksana Zasina (POL)	2
Zeynep Yetgil (TUR)	1

Bronze medal match
Tatiana Debien (FRA)	4
Jessica Blaszka (NED)	6
Roksana Zasina (POL)	0
Vanesa Kaladzinskaya (BLR)	2
