= 2026 European Wrestling Championships – Women's freestyle 53 kg =

Wrestling competition held in Tirana, Albania

Women's freestyle 53 kg at the 2026 European Wrestling Championships
- Venue: Tirana Olympic Park
- Location: Tirana, Albania
- Dates: 23–24 April
- Competitors: 13 from 11 nations

Medalists
gold medal	Mariia Yefremova	Ukraine
silver medal	Maria Prevolaraki	Greece
bronze medal	Natalia Malysheva
bronze medal	Annika Wendle	Germany

The women's freestyle 53 kilograms competition at the 2026 European Wrestling Championships was held from 23 to 24 April 2026 at the Tirana Olympic Park in Tirana, Albania.

== Results ==
Legend

- F — Won by fall
- WO — Won by walkover

=== Main bracket ===
Round of 16
Gerda Terék (HUN)	0
Vanesa Kaladzinskaya (UWW)	8^{F}
Natalia Malysheva (UWW)	1
Mariia Yefremova (UKR)	5
Zeynep Yetgil (TUR)	2
Carla Jaume (ESP)	7^{F}
Annika Wendle (GER)	4
Emma Luttenauer (FRA)	3
Beatrice Ferenţ (ROU)	11
Vestina Danisevičiūtė (LTU)	0

Quarterfinals
Jonna Malmgren (SWE)	5
Vanesa Kaladzinskaya (UWW)	12
Mariia Yefremova (UKR)	4^{F}
Carla Jaume (ESP)	0
Maria Prevolaraki (GRE)	10
Annika Wendle (GER)	0
Beatrice Ferenţ (ROU)	5
Roksana Zasina (POL)	8

Semifinals
Vanesa Kaladzinskaya (UWW)	3
Mariia Yefremova (UKR)	9
Maria Prevolaraki (GRE)	6
Roksana Zasina (POL)	6

Final
Mariia Yefremova (UKR)	2
Maria Prevolaraki (GRE)	1

=== Repechage ===
Repechage round 1
Natalia Malysheva (UWW)	10
Carla Jaume (ESP)	0

Bronze medal matches
Natalia Malysheva (UWW)	WO
Vanesa Kaladzinskaya (UWW)
Annika Wendle (GER)	2^{F}
Roksana Zasina (POL)	3

== Final standing ==
Rank	Wrestler
1st place, gold medalist(s)	Mariia Yefremova (UKR)
2nd place, silver medalist(s)	Maria Prevolaraki (GRE)
3rd place, bronze medalist(s)	Natalia Malysheva (UWW)
3rd place, bronze medalist(s)	Annika Wendle (GER)
5	Vanesa Kaladzinskaya (UWW)
5	Roksana Zasina (POL)
7	Carla Jaume (ESP)
8	Beatrice Ferenţ (ROU)
9	Jonna Malmgren (SWE)
10	Emma Luttenauer (FRA)
11	Zeynep Yetgil (TUR)
12	Gerda Terék (HUN)
13	Vestina Danisevičiūtė (LTU)
