= 2020 European Wrestling Championships – Women's freestyle 53 kg =

Competition at the 2020 European Wrestling Championships

The women's freestyle 53 kg is a competition featured at the 2020 European Wrestling Championships, and was held in Rome, Italy on February 13 and February 14.

== Medalists ==
Gold	Vanesa Kaladzinskaya; Belarus
Silver	Jessica Blaszka; Netherlands
Bronze	Stalvira Orshush; Russia
Bronze	Annika Wendle; Germany

== Results ==
Legend

- F — Won by fall
- WO — Won by walkover

=== Final ===
Final
Vanesa Kaladzinskaya (BLR)	3
Jessica Blaszka (NED)	1

=== Top half ===
Round of 32

Round of 16
Vanesa Kaladzinskaya (BLR)	1
Stalvira Orshush (RUS)	1
Mercédesz Dénes (HUN)
Iryna Husyak (UKR)	WO
Maria Prevolaraki (GRE)	10
Violeta Ponomarjova (LAT)	0
Zeynep Yetgil (TUR)	1
Katarzyna Krawczyk (POL)	3

Quarterfinals
Vanesa Kaladzinskaya (BLR)	4^{F}
Iryna Husyak (UKR)	4
Maria Prevolaraki (GRE)	3
Katarzyna Krawczyk (POL)	6

Semifinals
Vanesa Kaladzinskaya (BLR)	8
Katarzyna Krawczyk (POL)	3

=== Bottom half ===
Round of 32
Jessica Blaszka (NED)	5^{F}
Suzanna Şeicariu (ROU)	0
Tatyana Varansova (AZE)	8
Marina Rueda (ESP)	5

Round of 16
Sezen Belberova (BUL)	3
Tatiana Debien (FRA)	0
Iulia Leorda (MDA)	4
Annika Wendle (GER)	4
Silje Kippernes (NOR)	10
Sara Ettaki (ITA)	0
Jessica Blaszka (NED)	10
Tatyana Varansova (AZE)	0

Quarterfinals
Sezen Belberova (BUL)	4
Annika Wendle (GER)	11
Silje Kippernes (NOR)	0
Jessica Blaszka (NED)	6^{F}

Semifinals
Annika Wendle (GER)	1
Jessica Blaszka (NED)	2

=== Repechage ===
Repechage round 1
Suzanna Şeicariu (ROU)	4
Tatyana Varansova (AZE)	3

Repechage round 2
Stalvira Orshush (RUS)	10
Iryna Husyak (UKR)	0
Suzanna Şeicariu (ROU)	2^{F}
Silje Kippernes (NOR)	0

Bronze medal match
Stalvira Orshush (RUS)	6
Katarzyna Krawczyk (POL)	0
Suzanna Şeicariu (ROU)	1
Annika Wendle (GER)	4^{F}

== Final standing ==
Rank	Athlete
1st place, gold medalist(s)	Vanesa Kaladzinskaya (BLR)
2nd place, silver medalist(s)	Jessica Blaszka (NED)
3rd place, bronze medalist(s)	Stalvira Orshush (RUS)
3rd place, bronze medalist(s)	Annika Wendle (GER)
5	Katarzyna Krawczyk (POL)
5	Suzanna Şeicariu (ROU)
7	Maria Prevolaraki (GRE)
8	Iryna Husyak (UKR)
9	Silje Kippernes (NOR)
10	Tatyana Varansova (AZE)
11	Sezen Belberova (BUL)
12	Marina Rueda (ESP)
13	Iulia Leorda (MDA)
14	Zeynep Yetgil (TUR)
15	Mercédesz Dénes (HUN)
16	Tatiana Debien (FRA)
17	Violeta Ponomarjova (LAT)
18	Sara Ettaki (ITA)
