= Wrestling at the 2019 European Games – Women's freestyle 53 kg =

Women's freestyle 53 kg at the 2019 European Games
- Venue: Minsk Sports Palace
- Date: 26 June and 27 June
- Competitors: 16 from 16 nations

Medalists
gold medal	Sofia Mattsson	Sweden
silver medal	Yuliya Khalvadzhy	Ukraine
bronze medal	Nina Hemmer	Germany
bronze medal	Stalvira Orshush	Russia

The women's freestyle 97 kilograms wrestling competition at the 2019 European Games in Minsk was held on 26 to 27 June 2019 at the Minsk Sports Palace.

== Schedule ==
All times are in FET (UTC+03:00)

Date	Time	Event
Wednesday, 26 June 2019	11:50	1/8 finals
Wednesday, 26 June 2019	13:20	Quarterfinals
Wednesday, 26 June 2019	18:10	Semifinals
Thursday, 27 June 2019	11:00	Repechage
Thursday, 27 June 2019	19:00	Finals

== Results ==
Legend

- F — Won by fall

=== Main bracket ===
1/8 finals
Jessica Blaszka (NED)	6
Vanesa Kaladzinskaya (BLR)	14
Nina Hemmer (GER)	10
Florine Schedler (AUT)	0
Iulia Leorda (MDA)	6
Suzanna Şeicariu (ROU)	1
Sofia Mattsson (SWE)	12
Zeynep Yetgil (TUR)	4
Maria Prevolaraki (GRE)	10^{F}
Silje Kippernes (NOR)	0
Paula Kozłow (POL)	0
Stalvira Orshush (RUS)	10
Yuliya Khalvadzhy (UKR)	10
Marina Rueda (ESP)	0
Mercédesz Dénes (HUN)	4
Tatiana Debien (FRA)	1

Quarterfinals
Vanesa Kaladzinskaya (BLR)	6
Nina Hemmer (GER)	7
Iulia Leorda (MDA)	0
Sofia Mattsson (SWE)	10
Maria Prevolaraki (GRE)	2
Stalvira Orshush (RUS)	2
Yuliya Khalvadzhy (UKR)	10
Mercédesz Dénes (HUN)	2

Semifinals
Nina Hemmer (GER)	2
Sofia Mattsson (SWE)	10
Stalvira Orshush (RUS)	4
Yuliya Khalvadzhy (UKR)	7

Final
Sofia Mattsson (SWE)	6
Yuliya Khalvadzhy (UKR)	4

=== Repechage ===
Repechage round 1
Zeynep Yetgil (TUR)	8
Iulia Leorda (MDA)	3
Marina Rueda (ESP)	0
Mercédesz Dénes (HUN)	10

Bronze medals
Zeynep Yetgil (TUR)	0
Nina Hemmer (GER)	2
Mercédesz Dénes (HUN)	0
Stalvira Orshush (RUS)	10
