= 2026 World Wrestling Championships – Women's freestyle 53 kg =

Women's freestyle 53 kg at the 2026 World Championships
- Venue: Barys Arena
- Dates: 28–29 October 2026
- Competitors: 21 from 21 nations

Medalists
gold medal	Moe Kiyooka	Japan
silver medal	Lucía Yépez	Ecuador
bronze medal	Andreea Ana	Romania
bronze medal	Jonna Malmgren	Sweden

The women's freestyle 53 kilograms is a competition featured at the 2026 World Wrestling Championships, and was held in Astana, Kazakhstan on 28 and 29 October 2026.

This freestyle wrestling competition consists of a single-elimination tournament, with a repechage used to determine the winner of two bronze medals. The two finalists face off for gold and silver medals. Each wrestler who loses to one of the two finalists moves into the repechage, culminating in a pair of bronze medal matches, featuring the semifinal losers each facing the remaining repechage opponent from their half of the bracket.

== Results ==
Legend

- F — Won by fall
- WO — Won by walkover

=== Final ===
Final
Lucía Yépez (ECU)	0
Moe Kiyooka (JPN)	6

=== Top half ===
Round of 32
Nishu Bhanwala (IND)	4^{F}
Sabah Kaneb (MAR)	0
Viktoriia Vaulina (RUS)	11^{F}
Nogona Bakayoko (CIV)	4
Ainur Ashimova (KAZ)	WO
~~Mariia Yefremova (UKR)~~

Round of 16
Lucía Yépez (ECU)	11
Sakibjamal Esbosynova (UZB)	0
Nishu Bhanwala (IND)	0
Andreea Ana (ROU)	8
Cristelle Rodriguez-Dobler (USA)	6
Viktoriia Vaulina (RUS)	4
Ainur Ashimova (KAZ)	0
Roksana Zasina (POL)	10

Quarterfinals
Lucía Yépez (ECU)	4
Andreea Ana (ROU)	2
Cristelle Rodriguez-Dobler (USA)	1
Roksana Zasina (POL)	1

Semifinals
Lucía Yépez (ECU)	10
Cristelle Rodriguez-Dobler (USA)	0

=== Bottom half ===
Round of 32
Cheima Chebila (ALG)	0
Bayanmönkhiin Otgontuyaa (MGL)	11^{F}
Tatiana Debien (FRA)	6
Antonia Valdés (CHI)	1

Round of 16
Zhang Jin (CHN)	8
Annika Wendle (GER)	4
Bayanmönkhiin Otgontuyaa (MGL)	3
Christianah Ogunsanya (NGR)	2
Zeynep Yetgil (TUR)	6
Tatiana Debien (FRA)	0
Moe Kiyooka (JPN)	9
Jonna Malmgren (SWE)	2

Quarterfinals
Zhang Jin (CHN)	7
Bayanmönkhiin Otgontuyaa (MGL)	4
Zeynep Yetgil (TUR)	1
Moe Kiyooka (JPN)	9

Semifinals
Zhang Jin (CHN)	0
Moe Kiyooka (JPN)	6

=== Repechage ===
Repechage round 2
Sakibjamal Esbosynova (UZB)	0
Andreea Ana (ROU)	11
Jonna Malmgren (SWE)	4^{F}
Zeynep Yetgil (TUR)	0

Bronze medals
Andreea Ana (ROU)	6
Cristelle Rodriguez-Dobler (USA)	3
Jonna Malmgren (SWE)	5
Zhang Jin (CHN)	2

== Final standing ==
Rank	Athlete
1st place, gold medalist(s)	Moe Kiyooka (JPN)
2nd place, silver medalist(s)	Lucía Yépez (ECU)
3rd place, bronze medalist(s)	Andreea Ana (ROU)
3rd place, bronze medalist(s)	Jonna Malmgren (SWE)
5	Cristelle Rodriguez-Dobler (USA)
5	Zhang Jin (CHN)
7	Bayanmönkhiin Otgontuyaa (MGL)
8	Viktoriia Vaulina (RUS)
9	Nishu Bhanwala (IND)
10	Roksana Zasina (POL)
11	Ainur Ashimova (KAZ)
12	Zeynep Yetgil (TUR)
13	Tatiana Debien (FRA)
14	Annika Wendle (GER)
15	Christianah Ogunsanya (NGR)
16	Antonia Valdés (CHI)
17	Nogona Bakayoko (CIV)
18	Sabah Kaneb (MAR)
19	Cheima Chebila (ALG)
20	Sakibjamal Esbosynova (UZB)
—	Mariia Yefremova (UKR)
