= 2014 European Wrestling Championships – Women's freestyle 53 kg =

Wrestling competitions

The women's freestyle 53 kg is a competition featured at the 2014 European Wrestling Championships, and was held in Vantaa, Finland on April 2.

== Medalists ==
Gold	Maria Gurova; Russia
Silver	Maria Prevolaraki; Greece
Bronze	Natalia Budu; Moldova
Bronze	Ana Maria Pavăl; Romania

== Results ==
Legend

- F — Won by fall

=== Final ===
Final
Maria Gurova (RUS)	6
Maria Prevolaraki (GRE)	2

=== Top half ===
Round of 32

Round of 16
Vânia Guerreiro (POR)	8
Janika Vakkila (FIN)	2
Tatiana Debien (FRA)	4
Natalia Budu (MDA)	4
Maria Gurova (RUS)	8^{F}
Burcu Kebiç (TUR)	0
Lilya Horishna (UKR)	11
Evelina Nikolova (BUL)	12^{F}

Quarterfinals
Vânia Guerreiro (POR)	1
Natalia Budu (MDA)	12
Maria Gurova (RUS)	10
Evelina Nikolova (BUL)	0

Semifinals
Natalia Budu (MDA)	0
Maria Gurova (RUS)	5

=== Bottom half ===
Round of 32
Nadine Tokar (SUI)	0
Ana Maria Pavăl (ROU)	10
Lenka Martináková (CZE)	0
Nadzeya Shushko (BLR)	4^{F}
Katarzyna Krawczyk (POL)	10
Karalina Tjapko (LAT)	0

Round of 16
Patimat Bagomedova (AZE)	7
Laura Mertens (GER)	2
Francesca Mori (ITA)	4
Maria Prevolaraki (GRE)	10
Dorina Peter (AUT)	0
Ana Maria Pavăl (ROU)	10
Nadzeya Shushko (BLR)	1
Katarzyna Krawczyk (POL)	11

Quarterfinals
Patimat Bagomedova (AZE)	0
Maria Prevolaraki (GRE)	4^{F}
Ana Maria Pavăl (ROU)	4
Katarzyna Krawczyk (POL)	4

Semifinals
Maria Prevolaraki (GRE)	12
Ana Maria Pavăl (ROU)	1

=== Repechage ===
Repechage round 2
Burcu Kebiç (TUR)	7
Evelina Nikolova (BUL)	5
Francesca Mori (ITA)	0
Patimat Bagomedova (AZE)	10

Bronze medals
Burcu Kebiç (TUR)	4
Natalia Budu (MDA)	8^{F}
Patimat Bagomedova (AZE)	1
Ana Maria Pavăl (ROU)	1
