= 2023 European Wrestling Championships – Women's freestyle 53 kg =

Wrestling competition

Women's freestyle 53 kg at the 2023 European Wrestling Championships
- Venue: Arena Zagreb
- Location: Zagreb, Croatia
- Dates: 20-21 April
- Competitors: 12

Medalists
gold medal	Jonna Malmgren	Sweden
silver medal	Stalvira Orshush	Hungary
bronze medal	Zeynep Yetgil	Turkey
bronze medal	Maria Prevolaraki	Greece

The women's freestyle 53 kg is a competition featured at the 2023 European Wrestling Championships, and will held in Zagreb, Croatia on April 20 and 21.

== Results ==
Legend

- F — Won by fall

Round of 16
Zeynep Yetgil (TUR)	10
Roksana Zasina (POL)	0
Marija Spirkovska (MKD)	0
Turkan Nasirova (AZE)	10
Stalvira Orshush (HUN)	6
Anastasia Blayvas (GER)	1
Lilya Horishna (UKR)	10
Vestina Danisevičiūtė (LTU)	0

Quarterfinals
Jonna Malmgren (SWE)	11^{F}
Zeynep Yetgil (TUR)	6
Turkan Nasirova (AZE)	12
Marina Rueda (ESP)	5
Iulia Leorda (MDA)	1
Stalvira Orshush (HUN)	5
Lilya Horishna (UKR)	2
Maria Prevolaraki (GRE)	4^{F}

Semifinals
Jonna Malmgren (SWE)	4^{F}
Turkan Nasirova (AZE)	2
Stalvira Orshush (HUN)	2
Maria Prevolaraki (GRE)	2

Final
Jonna Malmgren (SWE)	9
Stalvira Orshush (HUN)	3

Repechage round 1
Anastasia Blayvas (GER)	1
Iulia Leorda (MDA)	3

Bronze medal match
Zeynep Yetgil (TUR)	10
Turkan Nasirova (AZE)	0
Iulia Leorda (MDA)	2
Maria Prevolaraki (GRE)	5

== Final standing ==
Rank	Athlete
1st place, gold medalist(s)	Jonna Malmgren (SWE)
2nd place, silver medalist(s)	Stalvira Orshush (HUN)
3rd place, bronze medalist(s)	Zeynep Yetgil (TUR)
3rd place, bronze medalist(s)	Maria Prevolaraki (GRE)
5	Iulia Leorda (MDA)
5	Turkan Nasirova (AZE)
7	Lilya Horishna (UKR)
8	Anastasia Blayvas (GER)
9	Marina Rueda (ESP)
10	Roksana Zasina (POL)
11	Marija Spirkovska (MKD)
12	Vestina Danisevičiūtė (LTU)
