= 2024 European Wrestling Championships – Women's freestyle 53 kg =

Wrestling competition

Women's freestyle 53 kg at the 2024 European Wrestling Championships
- Venue: Polyvalent Hall
- Location: Bucharest, Romania
- Dates: 15-16 February
- Competitors: 16

Medalists
gold medal	Vanesa Kaladzinskaya	Individual Neutral Athletes
silver medal	Jonna Malmgren	Sweden
bronze medal	Maria Prevolaraki	Greece
bronze medal	Zeynep Yetgil	Turkey

The women's freestyle 53 kg is a competition featured at the 2024 European Wrestling Championships, and held in Bucharest, Romania on February 15 and 16.

== Results ==
Legend

- F — Won by fall
- WO — Won by walkover

=== Main bracket ===
Round of 16
Vanesa Kaladzinskaya (AIN)	8
Veronika Ryabovolova (MKD)	1
Maria Ferone (ITA)	0
Natalia Malysheva (AIN)	10
Laura Stanelytė (LTU)	3^{F}
Irena Binkova (BUL)	3
Annika Wendle (GER)	0
Maria Prevolaraki (GRE)	4
Stalvira Orshush (HUN)	9
Lilia Malanchuk (UKR)	5
~~Iulia Leorda (MDA)~~
Tatiana Debien (FRA)	WO
Katarzyna Krawczyk (POL)	1
Zeynep Yetgil (TUR)	8
Elena Ionescu (ROU)	0
Jonna Malmgren (SWE)	4^{F}

Quarterfinals
Vanesa Kaladzinskaya (AIN)	8
Natalia Malysheva (AIN)	0
Laura Stanelytė (LTU)	0
Maria Prevolaraki (GRE)	11
Stalvira Orshush (HUN)	5
Tatiana Debien (FRA)	1
Zeynep Yetgil (TUR)	4
Jonna Malmgren (SWE)	8^{F}

Semifinals
Vanesa Kaladzinskaya (AIN)	6
Maria Prevolaraki (GRE)	0
Stalvira Orshush (HUN)	0
Jonna Malmgren (SWE)	4^{F}

Final
Vanesa Kaladzinskaya (AIN)	10
Jonna Malmgren (SWE)	2

=== Repechage ===
Repechage round 1
Veronika Ryabovolova (MKD)	2
Natalia Malysheva (AIN)	2
Elena Ionescu (ROU)	0
Zeynep Yetgil (TUR)	8^{F}

Bronze medal match
Natalia Malysheva (AIN)	11
Maria Prevolaraki (GRE)	6^{F}
Zeynep Yetgil (TUR)	3
Stalvira Orshush (HUN)	1

== Final standing ==
Rank	Athlete
1st place, gold medalist(s)	Vanesa Kaladzinskaya (AIN)
2nd place, silver medalist(s)	Jonna Malmgren (SWE)
3rd place, bronze medalist(s)	Maria Prevolaraki (GRE)
3rd place, bronze medalist(s)	Zeynep Yetgil (TUR)
5	Natalia Malysheva (AIN)
5	Stalvira Orshush (HUN)
7	Tatiana Debien (FRA)
8	Laura Stanelytė (LTU)
9	Veronika Ryabovolova (MKD)
10	Lilia Malanchuk (UKR)
11	Katarzyna Krawczyk (POL)
12	Irena Binkova (BUL)
13	Annika Wendle (GER)
14	Maria Ferone (ITA)
15	Elena Ionescu (ROU)
—	Iulia Leorda (MDA)
