= 2021 European Wrestling Championships – Women's freestyle 53 kg =

Wrestling competition

The women's freestyle 53 kg is a competition featured at the 2021 European Wrestling Championships, and was held in Warsaw, Poland on April 22 and April 23.

== Medalists ==
Gold	Olga Khoroshavtseva; Russia
Silver	Maria Prevolaraki; Greece
Bronze	Annika Wendle; Germany
Bronze	Iulia Leorda; Moldova

== Results ==
Legend

- F — Won by fall

1/8 finals
Katarzyna Krawczyk (POL)	12
Kamilė Šernauskaite (LTU)	1

Quarterfinals
Mariia Vynnyk (UKR)	15
Zeynep Yetgil (TUR)	5
Maria Prevolaraki (GRE)	6
Annika Wendle (GER)	0
Olga Khoroshavtseva (RUS)	4^{F}
Tatyana Varansova (AZE)	0
Iulia Leorda (MDA)	7
Katarzyna Krawczyk (POL)	1

Semifinals
Mariia Vynnyk (UKR)	2
Maria Prevolaraki (GRE)	11
Olga Khoroshavtseva (RUS)	9
Iulia Leorda (MDA)	0

Final
Maria Prevolaraki (GRE)	0
Olga Khoroshavtseva (RUS)	7

Bronze medal match
Annika Wendle (GER)	8
Mariia Vynnyk (UKR)	1
Tatyana Varansova (AZE)	0
Iulia Leorda (MDA)	10

== Final standing ==
Rank	Athlete
1st place, gold medalist(s)	Olga Khoroshavtseva (RUS)
2nd place, silver medalist(s)	Maria Prevolaraki (GRE)
3rd place, bronze medalist(s)	Annika Wendle (GER)
3rd place, bronze medalist(s)	Iulia Leorda (MDA)
5	Mariia Vynnyk (UKR)
5	Tatyana Varansova (AZE)
7	Katarzyna Krawczyk (POL)
8	Zeynep Yetgil (TUR)
9	Kamilė Šernauskaite (LTU)
