= 2022 European Wrestling Championships – Women's freestyle 53 kg =

Wrestling competition

Women's freestyle 53 kg at the 2022 European Wrestling Championships
- Venue: BOK Sports Hall
- Location: Budapest, Hungary
- Dates: 31 March - 1 April
- Competitors: 11

Medalists
gold medal	Jonna Malmgren	Sweden
silver medal	Maria Prevolaraki	Greece
bronze medal	Iulia Leorda	Moldova
bronze medal	Katarzyna Krawczyk	Poland

The women's freestyle 53 kg was a competition featured at the 2022 European Wrestling Championships, and was held in Budapest, Hungary on March 31 and 1 April.

== Results ==
Legend

- F — Won by fall

=== Main Bracket ===
1/8 finals
Maria Prevolaraki (GRE)	3
Tatiana Debien (FRA)	1
Marina Rueda (ESP)	2
Liliia Malanchuk (UKR)	12
Irena Binkova (BUL)	0
Mercédesz Dénes (HUN)	5^{F}

Quarterfinals
Iulia Leorda (MDA)	3
Maria Prevolaraki (GRE)	7^{F}
Zeynep Yetgil (TUR)	4
Annika Wendle (GER)	2
Jonna Malmgren (SWE)	12
Liliia Malanchuk (UKR)	2
Mercédesz Dénes (HUN)	0
Katarzyna Krawczyk (POL)	10

Semifinals
Maria Prevolaraki (GRE)	5^{F}
Zeynep Yetgil (TUR)	0
Jonna Malmgren (SWE)	3^{F}
Katarzyna Krawczyk (POL)	3

Final
Maria Prevolaraki (GRE)	2
Jonna Malmgren (SWE)	3

=== Repechage ===
Repechage round 1
Tatiana Debien (FRA)	3
Iulia Leorda (MDA)	6

Bronze medal match
Iulia Leorda (MDA)	3
Zeynep Yetgil (TUR)	2
Liliia Malanchuk (UKR)	4
Katarzyna Krawczyk (POL)	14

== Final standing ==
Rank	Wrestler	UWW Points
1st place, gold medalist(s)	Jonna Malmgren (SWE)	10000
2nd place, silver medalist(s)	Maria Prevolaraki (GRE)	8000
3rd place, bronze medalist(s)	Iulia Leorda (MDA)	6500
3rd place, bronze medalist(s)	Katarzyna Krawczyk (POL)	6500
5	Zeynep Yetgil (TUR)	5000
5	Liliia Malanchuk (UKR)	5000
7	Mercédesz Dénes (HUN)	4400
8	Tatiana Debien (FRA)	4000
9	Annika Wendle (GER)	3500
10	Marina Rueda (ESP)	3100
11	Irena Binkova (BUL)	1000
