= 2018 European Wrestling Championships – Women's freestyle 53 kg =

The women's freestyle 53 kg is a competition featured at the 2018 European Wrestling Championships, and was held in Kaspiysk, Russia on May 3 and May 4.

== Medalists ==
Gold	Stalvira Orshush; Russia
Silver	Vanesa Kaladzinskaya; Belarus
Bronze	Maria Prevolaraki; Greece
Bronze	Katarzyna Krawczyk; Poland

== Results ==
Legend

- F — Won by fall

=== Main Bracket ===
1/8 finals
Vanesa Kaladzinskaya (BLR)	11
Karalina Tjapko (LAT)	0
Nina Hemmer (GER)	7
Aysun Erge (TUR)	8
Stalvira Orshush (RUS)	10
Estera Tămăduianu-Dobre (ROU)	0
Mercédesz Dénes (HUN)	8^{F}
Marina Rueda (ESP)	0
Katarzyna Krawczyk (POL)	11
Daniela Lundström (SWE)	0
Khrystyna Bereza (UKR)	4
Iulia Leorda (MDA)	7

Quarterfinals
Maria Prevolaraki (GRE)	10
Anzhela Dorogan (AZE)	4
Vanesa Kaladzinskaya (BLR)	10
Aysun Erge (TUR)	2
Stalvira Orshush (RUS)	10
Mercédesz Dénes (HUN)	0
Katarzyna Krawczyk (POL)	11
Iulia Leorda (MDA)	0

Semifinals
Maria Prevolaraki (GRE)	2
Vanesa Kaladzinskaya (BLR)	5
Stalvira Orshush (RUS)	6
Katarzyna Krawczyk (POL)	5

Final
Vanesa Kaladzinskaya (BLR)	0
Stalvira Orshush (RUS)	7^{F}

=== Repechage ===
Repechage round 1
Karalina Tjapko (LAT)	9
Aysun Erge (TUR)	20
Estera Tămăduianu-Dobre (ROU)	5
Mercédesz Dénes (HUN)	6

Bronze medal match
Aysun Erge (TUR)	7
Maria Prevolaraki (GRE)	12
Mercédesz Dénes (HUN)	0
Katarzyna Krawczyk (POL)	7^{F}
