= 2025 European Wrestling Championships – Women's freestyle 53 kg =

Wrestling competition

Women's freestyle 53 kg at the 2025 European Wrestling Championships
- Venue: X-Bionic Sphere
- Location: Bratislava, Slovakia
- Dates: 10-11 April
- Competitors: 12

Medalists
gold medal	Maria Prevolaraki	Greece
silver medal	Andreea Ana	Romania
bronze medal	Natalia Malysheva
bronze medal	Zeynep Yetgil	Turkey

The women's freestyle 53 kg is a competition featured at the 2025 European Wrestling Championships, and was held in Bratislava, Slovakia on April 10 and 11.

== Results ==
Legend

- F — Won by fall

=== Main bracket ===
Round of 16
Laura Stanelytė (LTU)	0
Lilia Malanchuk (UKR)	11
Réka Hegedüs (SVK)	0
Victoria Báez (ESP)	2
Iulia Leorda (MDA)	2
Viyaleta Rebikava (UWW)	4
Katarzyna Krawczyk (POL)	8
Oleksandra Kogut (AUT)	0

Quarterfinals
Andreea Ana (ROU)	5
Lilia Malanchuk (UKR)	4
Victoria Báez (ESP)	0
Natalia Malysheva (UWW)	10
Maria Prevolaraki (GRE)	5
Viyaleta Rebikava (UWW)	0
Katarzyna Krawczyk (POL)	2
Zeynep Yetgil (TUR)	5

Semifinals
Andreea Ana (ROU)	5
Natalia Malysheva (UWW)	3
Maria Prevolaraki (GRE)	12^{F}
Zeynep Yetgil (TUR)	4

Final
Andreea Ana (ROU)	3
Maria Prevolaraki (GRE)	5

=== Repechage ===
Bronze medal match
Lilia Malanchuk (UKR)	0
Natalia Malysheva (UWW)	11
Viyaleta Rebikava (UWW)	1
Zeynep Yetgil (TUR)	2

== Final standing ==
Rank	Athlete
1st place, gold medalist(s)	Maria Prevolaraki (GRE)
2nd place, silver medalist(s)	Andreea Ana (ROU)
3rd place, bronze medalist(s)	Natalia Malysheva (UWW)
3rd place, bronze medalist(s)	Zeynep Yetgil (TUR)
5	Lilia Malanchuk (UKR)
5	Viyaleta Rebikava (UWW)
7	Katarzyna Krawczyk (POL)
8	Victoria Báez (ESP)
9	Iulia Leorda (MDA)
10	Réka Hegedüs (SVK)
11	Oleksandra Kogut (AUT)
12	Laura Stanelytė (LTU)
