= 2022 World Wrestling Championships – Women's freestyle 53 kg =

Wrestling competitions

Women's freestyle 53 kg at the 2022 World Championships
- Venue: Štark Arena
- Dates: 13–14 September 2022
- Competitors: 23 from 23 nations

Medalists
gold medal	Dominique Parrish	United States
silver medal	Batkhuyagiin Khulan	Mongolia
bronze medal	Vinesh Phogat	India
bronze medal	Maria Prevolaraki	Greece

The women's freestyle 53 kilograms is a competition featured at the 2022 World Wrestling Championships, and was held in Belgrade, Serbia on 13 and 14 September 2022.

This freestyle wrestling competition consists of a single-elimination tournament, with a repechage used to determine the winner of two bronze medals. The two finalists face off for gold and silver medals. Each wrestler who loses to one of the two finalists moves into the repechage, culminating in a pair of bronze medal matches featuring the semifinal losers each facing the remaining repechage opponent from their half of the bracket.

== Results ==
Legend

- F — Won by fall
- R — Retired
- WO — Won by walkover

=== Final ===
Final
Batkhuyagiin Khulan (MGL)	2
Dominique Parrish (USA)	4

=== Top half ===
Round of 32
Vinesh Phogat (IND)	0
Batkhuyagiin Khulan (MGL)	7
Tatiana Debien (FRA)	6
Aktenge Keunimjaeva (UZB)	4
Karla Acosta (MEX)	4^{F}
Zhong Yuhong (CHN)	0

Round of 16
Iulia Leorda (MDA)	1
Leyla Gurbanova (AZE)	5
Batkhuyagiin Khulan (MGL)	3
Zhuldyz Eshimova (KAZ)	0
Zeynep Yetgil (TUR)	8
Tatiana Debien (FRA)	0
Karla Acosta (MEX)	0
Jonna Malmgren (SWE)	4^{F}

Quarterfinals
Leyla Gurbanova (AZE)	1^{R}
Batkhuyagiin Khulan (MGL)	4
Zeynep Yetgil (TUR)	2
Jonna Malmgren (SWE)	6^{F}

Semifinals
Batkhuyagiin Khulan (MGL)	2^{F}
Jonna Malmgren (SWE)	6

=== Bottom half ===
Round of 32
Lucía Yépez (ECU)	13
Oh Hyun-young (KOR)	2
Nogona Bakayoko (CIV)	0
Mercédesz Dénes (HUN)	6^{F}
Kiều Thị Ly (VIE)	4
Marina Rueda (ESP)	4^{F}
Liliia Malanchuk (UKR)	0
Laura Herin (CUB)	10

Round of 16
Katarzyna Krawczyk (POL)	4
Lucía Yépez (ECU)	9
Mercédesz Dénes (HUN)	0
Dominique Parrish (USA)	10
Maria Prevolaraki (GRE)	10^{F}
Marina Rueda (ESP)	0
Laura Herin (CUB)	10
Samantha Stewart (CAN)	0

Quarterfinals
Lucía Yépez (ECU)	0
Dominique Parrish (USA)	10
Maria Prevolaraki (GRE)	7
Laura Herin (CUB)	5

Semifinals
Dominique Parrish (USA)	3
Maria Prevolaraki (GRE)	1

=== Repechage ===
Repechage round 1
Vinesh Phogat (IND)	4^{F}
Zhuldyz Eshimova (KAZ)	0

Repechage round 2
Vinesh Phogat (IND)	WO
Leyla Gurbanova (AZE)
Mercédesz Dénes (HUN)	0
Lucía Yépez (ECU)	10

Bronze medals
Vinesh Phogat (IND)	8
Jonna Malmgren (SWE)	0
Lucía Yépez (ECU)	4
Maria Prevolaraki (GRE)	14

== Final standing ==
Rank	Athlete
1st place, gold medalist(s)	Dominique Parrish (USA)
2nd place, silver medalist(s)	Batkhuyagiin Khulan (MGL)
3rd place, bronze medalist(s)	Vinesh Phogat (IND)
3rd place, bronze medalist(s)	Maria Prevolaraki (GRE)
5	Jonna Malmgren (SWE)
5	Lucía Yépez (ECU)
7	Laura Herin (CUB)
8	Mercédesz Dénes (HUN)
9	Karla Acosta (MEX)
10	Marina Rueda (ESP)
11	Zeynep Yetgil (TUR)
12	Leyla Gurbanova (AZE)
13	Tatiana Debien (FRA)
14	Aktenge Keunimjaeva (UZB)
15	Katarzyna Krawczyk (POL)
16	Oh Hyun-young (KOR)
17	Iulia Leorda (MDA)
18	Kiều Thị Ly (VIE)
19	Zhong Yuhong (CHN)
20	Nogona Bakayoko (CIV)
21	Zhuldyz Eshimova (KAZ)
22	Samantha Stewart (CAN)
23	Liliia Malanchuk (UKR)
