= 2021 World Wrestling Championships – Women's freestyle 53 kg =

Wrestling competitions

Women's freestyle 53 kg at the 2021 World Championships
- Venue: Nye Jordal Amfi
- Dates: 5–6 October 2021
- Competitors: 17 from 17 nations

Medalists
gold medal	Akari Fujinami	Japan
silver medal	Iulia Leorda	Moldova
bronze medal	Katarzyna Krawczyk	Poland
bronze medal	Samantha Stewart	Canada

The women's freestyle 53 kilograms is a competition featured at the 2021 World Wrestling Championships, and was held in Oslo, Norway on 5 and 6 October.

This freestyle wrestling competition consists of a single-elimination tournament, with a repechage used to determine the winner of two bronze medals. The two finalists face off for gold and silver medals. Each wrestler who loses to one of the two finalists moves into the repechage, culminating in a pair of bronze medal matches featuring the semifinal losers each facing the remaining repechage opponent from their half of the bracket.

== Results ==
Legend

- F — Won by fall

=== Final ===
Final
Akari Fujinami (JPN)	10
Iulia Leorda (MDA)	0

=== Top half ===
Round of 32

Round of 16
Luisa Valverde (ECU)	5
Katsiaryna Pichkouskaya (BLR)	0
Akari Fujinami (JPN)	11
Pooja Jatt (IND)	0
Park Eun-young (KOR)	1
Jonna Malmgren (SWE)	4
Amy Fearnside (USA)	0
Katarzyna Krawczyk (POL)	10

Quarterfinals
Luisa Valverde (ECU)	0
Akari Fujinami (JPN)	10
Jonna Malmgren (SWE)	1
Katarzyna Krawczyk (POL)	8^{F}

Semifinals
Akari Fujinami (JPN)	10
Katarzyna Krawczyk (POL)	0

=== Bottom half ===
Round of 32
Zeynep Yetgil (TUR)	5
Annika Wendle (GER)	3

Round of 16
Assylzat Sagymbay (KAZ)	0
Iulia Leorda (MDA)	2^{F}
Anzhelika Vetoshkina (RWF)	0
Samantha Stewart (CAN)	10^{F}
Kamilė Šernauskaitė (LTU)	0
Khrystyna Bereza (UKR)	10
Zeynep Yetgil (TUR)	8^{F}
Bat-Ochiryn Bolortuyaa (MGL)	2

Quarterfinals
Iulia Leorda (MDA)	10
Samantha Stewart (CAN)	4
Khrystyna Bereza (UKR)	6
Zeynep Yetgil (TUR)	3

Semifinals
Iulia Leorda (MDA)	6^{F}
Khrystyna Bereza (UKR)	10

=== Repechage ===
Repechage round 2
Pooja Jatt (IND)	0
Luisa Valverde (ECU)	2^{F}
Assylzat Sagymbay (KAZ)	0
Samantha Stewart (CAN)	10

Bronze medals
Luisa Valverde (ECU)	1
Katarzyna Krawczyk (POL)	7
Samantha Stewart (CAN)	4^{F}
Khrystyna Bereza (UKR)	0

== Final standing ==
Rank	Athlete
1st place, gold medalist(s)	Akari Fujinami (JPN)
2nd place, silver medalist(s)	Iulia Leorda (MDA)
3rd place, bronze medalist(s)	Katarzyna Krawczyk (POL)
3rd place, bronze medalist(s)	Samantha Stewart (CAN)
5	Luisa Valverde (ECU)
5	Khrystyna Bereza (UKR)
7	Zeynep Yetgil (TUR)
8	Jonna Malmgren (SWE)
9	Annika Wendle (GER)
10	Park Eun-young (KOR)
11	Bat-Ochiryn Bolortuyaa (MGL)
12	Katsiaryna Pichkouskaya (BLR)
13	Amy Fearnside (USA)
14	Anzhelika Vetoshkina (RWF)
15	Kamilė Šernauskaitė (LTU)
16	Assylzat Sagymbay (KAZ)
17	Pooja Jatt (IND)
