= Wrestling at the 2026 Asian Games – Women's freestyle 53 kg =

Women's freestyle 53 kg at the 2026 Asian Games
- Venue: Inae Sports Center
- Date: 3 October 2026
- Competitors: 11 from 11 nations

Medalists
gold medal	Moe Kiyooka	Japan
silver medal	Antim Panghal	India
bronze medal	Zhang Jin	China
bronze medal	Bayanmönkhiin Otgontuyaa	Mongolia

The women's freestyle 53 kilograms wrestling competition at the 2026 Asian Games in Nagoya was held on 3 October 2026 at the Inae Sports Center.

This freestyle wrestling competition consists of a single-elimination tournament, with a repechage used to determine the winner of two bronze medals. The two finalists face off for gold and silver medals. Each wrestler who loses to one of the two finalists moves into the repechage, culminating in a pair of bronze medal matches featuring the semifinal losers each facing the remaining repechage opponent from their half of the bracket.

== Schedule ==
All times are Japan Standard Time (UTC+09:00)

Date	Time	Event
Saturday, 3 October 2026	10:30	1/8 finals
Saturday, 3 October 2026	10:30	1/4 finals
Saturday, 3 October 2026	10:30	Semifinals
Saturday, 3 October 2026	10:30	Repechages
Saturday, 3 October 2026	18:00	Finals

== Results ==
Legend

- F — Won by fall

=== Main bracket ===
1/8 finals
Shugyla Omirbek (KAZ)	0
Antim Panghal (IND)	9
Moe Kiyooka (JPN)	12
Park Seo-young (KOR)	0
Bayanmönkhiin Otgontuyaa (MGL)	2^{F}
Choe Hyo-gyong (PRK)	2

1/4 finals
Sakibjamal Esbosynova (UZB)	0
Antim Panghal (IND)	8^{F}
Rea Grace Cervantes (PHI)	0
Zhang Jin (CHN)	10^{F}
Vatansulton Shakarshoeva (TJK)	0
Moe Kiyooka (JPN)	10
Bayanmönkhiin Otgontuyaa (MGL)	8^{F}
Nguyễn Thị Mỹ Linh (VIE)	0

Semifinals
Antim Panghal (IND)	6
Zhang Jin (CHN)	1
Moe Kiyooka (JPN)	12
Bayanmönkhiin Otgontuyaa (MGL)	0

Final
Antim Panghal (IND)	1
Moe Kiyooka (JPN)	9

=== Repechage ===
Repechage
Shugyla Omirbek (KAZ)	2^{F}
Sakibjamal Esbosynova (UZB)	2
Park Seo-young (KOR)	4
Vatansulton Shakarshoeva (TJK)	0

Bronze medal matches
Shugyla Omirbek (KAZ)	2
Zhang Jin (CHN)	8^{F}
Park Seo-young (KOR)	0
Bayanmönkhiin Otgontuyaa (MGL)	7

== Final standing ==
Rank	Athlete
1st place, gold medalist(s)	Moe Kiyooka (JPN)
2nd place, silver medalist(s)	Antim Panghal (IND)
3rd place, bronze medalist(s)	Zhang Jin (CHN)
3rd place, bronze medalist(s)	Bayanmönkhiin Otgontuyaa (MGL)
5	Shugyla Omirbek (KAZ)
5	Park Seo-young (KOR)
7	Choe Hyo-gyong (PRK)
8	Sakibjamal Esbosynova (UZB)
9	Nguyễn Thị Mỹ Linh (VIE)
10	Rea Grace Cervantes (PHI)
11	Vatansulton Shakarshoeva (TJK)
