= 2024 World Wrestling Championships – Women's freestyle 55 kg =

Wrestling competitions

Women's freestyle 55 kg at the 2024 World Championships
- Venue: Tirana Olympic Park
- Dates: 29–30 October 2024
- Competitors: 18 from 16 nations

Medalists
gold medal	Moe Kiyooka	Japan
silver medal	Zhang Jin	China
bronze medal	Tatiana Debien	France
bronze medal	Iryna Kurachkina

The women's freestyle 55 kilograms was a competition featured at the 2024 World Wrestling Championships, and was held in Tirana, Albania on 29 and 30 October 2024.

This freestyle wrestling competition consists of a single-elimination tournament, with a repechage used to determine the winner of two bronze medals. The two finalists face off for gold and silver medals. Each wrestler who loses to one of the two finalists moves into the repechage, culminating in a pair of bronze medal matches, featuring the semifinal losers each facing the remaining repechage opponent from their half of the bracket.

Each bout consists of a single round within a six-minute limit, including two halves of three minutes. The wrestler who scores more points is the winner.

== Results ==
Legend

- F — Won by fall

=== Final ===
Final
Zhang Jin (CHN)	0
Moe Kiyooka (JPN)	10

=== Top half ===
Round of 32
Kirti Jaglan (IND)	0
Zhang Jin (CHN)	2^{F}

Round of 16
Karla Godinez (CAN)	5
Tatiana Debien (FRA)	5
Zhang Jin (CHN)	10
Iulia Leorda (MDA)	0
Zulfiya Yakhyarova (KAZ)	0
Areana Villaescusa (USA)	8^{F}
Elvira Süleyman Kamaloğlu (TUR)	6
Jowita Wrzesień (POL)	2

Quarterfinals
Tatiana Debien (FRA)	0
Zhang Jin (CHN)	11
Areana Villaescusa (USA)	11
Elvira Süleyman Kamaloğlu (TUR)	4

Semifinals
Zhang Jin (CHN)	8^{F}
Areana Villaescusa (USA)	0

=== Bottom half ===
Round of 32
Olga Khoroshavtseva (AIN)	3
Iryna Kurachkina (AIN)	4

Round of 16
Moe Kiyooka (JPN)	7
Veronika Ryabovolova (MKD)	0
Ramóna Galambos (HUN)	7
Zeltzin Hernández (MEX)	0
Nina Hemmer (GER)	0
Iryna Kurachkina (AIN)	8
Oleksandra Khomenets (UKR)	4^{F}
Chinboldyn Otgontuyaa (MGL)	3

Quarterfinals
Moe Kiyooka (JPN)	11
Ramóna Galambos (HUN)	0
Iryna Kurachkina (AIN)	6
Oleksandra Khomenets (UKR)	2

Semifinals
Moe Kiyooka (JPN)	4
Iryna Kurachkina (AIN)	0

=== Repechage ===
Repechage round 1
Kirti Jaglan (IND)	6
Iulia Leorda (MDA)	2

Repechage round 2
Kirti Jaglan (IND)	0
Tatiana Debien (FRA)	4^{F}
Veronika Ryabovolova (MKD)	1
Ramóna Galambos (HUN)	7

Bronze medals
Tatiana Debien (FRA)	4
Areana Villaescusa (USA)	3
Ramóna Galambos (HUN)	3
Iryna Kurachkina (AIN)	5

== Final standing ==
Rank	Athlete
1st place, gold medalist(s)	Moe Kiyooka (JPN)
2nd place, silver medalist(s)	Zhang Jin (CHN)
3rd place, bronze medalist(s)	Tatiana Debien (FRA)
3rd place, bronze medalist(s)	Iryna Kurachkina (AIN)
5	Areana Villaescusa (USA)
5	Ramóna Galambos (HUN)
7	Oleksandra Khomenets (UKR)
8	Elvira Süleyman Kamaloğlu (TUR)
9	Kirti Jaglan (IND)
10	Karla Godinez (CAN)
11	Olga Khoroshavtseva (AIN)
12	Jowita Wrzesień (POL)
13	Iulia Leorda (MDA)
14	Veronika Ryabovolova (MKD)
15	Chinboldyn Otgontuyaa (MGL)
16	Zeltzin Hernández (MEX)
17	Zulfiya Yakhyarova (KAZ)
18	Nina Hemmer (GER)
