= 2017 European Wrestling Championships – Women's freestyle 53 kg =

The women's freestyle 53 kg is a competition featured at the 2017 European Wrestling Championships, and was held in Novi Sad, Serbia on May 3.

== Medalists ==
Gold	Vanesa Kaladzinskaya (BLR)
Silver	Natalia Malysheva (RUS)
Bronze	Nina Hemmer (GER)
Bronze	Maria Prevolaraki (GRE)

== Results ==
Legend

- F — Won by fall

=== Top half ===
Qualification
Estera Dobre (ROU)	2
Anzhela Dorogan (AZE)	8
Iulia Leorda (MDA)	9
Vanesa Kaladzinskaya (BLR)	14
Roksana Zasina (POL)	10
Emma Brobeck (SWE)	0
Maria Prevolaraki (GRE)	2^{F}
Iryna Husyak (UKR)	1

Quarterfinals
Ana Randelović (SRB)	0
Natalia Malysheva (RUS)	10
Nina Hemmer (GER)	5^{F}
Fikriye Gök (TUR)	0
Anzhela Dorogan (AZE)	2
Vanesa Kaladzinskaya (BLR)	7
Roksana Zasina (POL)	1
Maria Prevolaraki (GRE)	3

Semifinals
Natalia Malysheva (RUS)	5
Nina Hemmer (GER)	4
Vanesa Kaladzinskaya (BLR)	2
Maria Prevolaraki (GRE)	1

Final
Natalia Malysheva (RUS)	1
Vanesa Kaladzinskaya (BLR)	2

=== Repechage ===
Repechage round 2
Iulia Leorda (MDA)	2^{F}
Anzhela Dorogan (AZE)	4

Bronze medals
Ana Randelović (SRB)	0
Nina Hemmer (GER)	11
Iulia Leorda (MDA)	0
Maria Prevolaraki (GRE)	2^{F}
