= Mohammad Naghousi =

Iranian Greco-Roman wrestler

Personal information
- Native name: محمد ناقوسی
- Born: 6 September 2001 (age 25) Dezful, Iran
- Height: 1.80 m (5 ft 11 in)
- Weight: 82 kg (181 lb; 12.9 st)

Sport
- Country: Iran
- Sport: Greco-Roman
- Event: 82 kg
Medal record
Men's Greco-Roman wrestling
Representing Iran
Asian Championships
Gold medal – first place	2025 Amman	82 kg
Dan Kolov & Nikola Petrov Tournament
Gold medal – first place	2024 Sofia	82 kg
Bronze medal – third place	2025 Varna	82 kg
Grand Prix
Silver medal – second place	2019 Mladenovac	77 kg
Bronze medal – third place	2019 Zagreb	77 kg
Bronze medal – third place	2020 Shiraz	82 kg
Bronze medal – third place	2023 Budapest	77 kg
U23 World Championships
Gold medal – first place	2024 Tirana	82 kg
World Junior Championships
Gold medal – first place	2019 Tallinn	77 kg
Bronze medal – third place	2021 Ufa	82 kg
Asian Juniors Championships
Gold medal – first place	2019 Chon Buri	77 kg
World Cadets Championships
Bronze medal – third place	2018 Zagreb	80 kg
Asian Cadets Championships
Gold medal – first place	2018 Tashkent	80 kg

Mohammad Naghousi (born 6 September 2001) is an Iranian Greco-Roman wrestler competing in the 82 kg division. He won the gold medal at the 2025 Asian Wrestling Championships.

== Career ==
In the 2025 Asian Wrestling Championships held in Amman, Jordan, he reached the final by defeating Uzbek Mukhammadkodir Rasulov 1–1 in the first round, Kyrgyz Bekzat Orunkul Uulu 4–1 in the quarterfinals, and Shahin Badaghi, another Iranian competing for Qatar, 4–3 in the semifinals. He defeated Kazakh Omar Satayev 3–1 in the final match and won the gold medal.
