= Wrestling at the 2022 Mediterranean Games – Women's freestyle 53 kg =

Wrestling competitions

Women's Freestyle 53 kg at the 2022 Mediterranean Games
- Venue: EMEC Hall
- Date: 28–29 June
- Competitors: 8 from 8 nations

Medalists
gold medal	Maria Prevolaraki	Greece
silver medal	Zeynep Yetgil	Turkey
bronze medal	Marina Rueda	Spain
bronze medal	Shaimaa Atef Mohamed	Egypt

The women's freestyle 53 kg competition of the wrestling events at the 2022 Mediterranean Games in Oran, Algeria, was held from 28 June to 29 June at the EMEC Hall.

== Results ==
Legend

- F — Won by fall

Quarterfinals		Semifinals		Final
Emma Luttenauer (FRA)	2
Maria Prevolaraki (GRE)	12	Maria Prevolaraki (GRE)	10
Marina Rueda (ESP)	6^{F}	Marina Rueda (ESP)	0
Zineb Hassoune (MAR)	2			Maria Prevolaraki (GRE)	3
Shaimaa Atef Mohamed (EGY)	10			Zeynep Yetgil (TUR)	1
Lamia Chemlal (ALG)	10	Shaimaa Atef Mohamed (EGY)	1
Carmen Di Dio (ITA)	0	Zeynep Yetgil (TUR)	4
Zeynep Yetgil (TUR)	10

Bronze medals
Emma Luttenauer (FRA)	10
Marina Rueda (ESP)	11
Carmen Di Dio (ITA)	3
Shaimaa Atef Mohamed (EGY)	6
