= 2024 U23 World Wrestling Championships – Men's Greco-Roman 82 kg =

Wrestling competitions

Men's Greco-Roman 82 kg at the 2024 U23 World Championships
- Venue: Tirana Olympic Park
- Dates: 21–22 October
- Competitors: 27 from 25 nations

Medalists
gold medal	Mohammad Naghousi	Iran
silver medal	Beka Melelashvili	United States
bronze medal	Deni Nakaev	Germany
bronze medal	Data Chkhaidze	Georgia

The men's Greco-Roman 82 kilograms is a competition featured at the 2024 U23 World Wrestling Championships, and was held in Tirana, Albania on 21 and 22 October 2024.

This Greco-Roman wrestling competition consists of a single-elimination tournament, with a repechage used to determine the winner of two bronze medals. The two finalists face off for gold and silver medals. Each wrestler who loses to one of the two finalists moves into the repechage, culminating in a pair of bronze medal matches featuring the semifinal losers each facing the remaining repechage opponent from their half of the bracket.

== Results ==
Legend

- F — Won by fall

=== Final ===
Final
Mohammad Naghousi (IRI)	4
Beka Melelashvili (USA)	3

=== Top half ===
Round of 32
Bekzat Orunkul Uulu (KGZ)	3
Samvel Grigoryan (ARM)	4
Leon Rivalta (ITA)	8
Deni Nakaev (GER)	17
Samandar Bobonazarov (UZB)	8
Miklós Királyházi (HUN)	0
Ivan Chmyr (UKR)	1
Alexandru Solovei (MDA)	6
Evangelos Boukis (GRE)	0
Mohammad Naghousi (IRI)	5

Round of 16
Yusuf Gölbaşı (TUR)	0
Samvel Grigoryan (ARM)	5
Deni Nakaev (GER)	4
Samandar Bobonazarov (UZB)	1
Emad Abouelatta (EGY)	3
Alexandru Solovei (MDA)	2
Mohammad Naghousi (IRI)	11
Marek Vrba (CZE)	0

Quarterfinals
Samvel Grigoryan (ARM)	1
Deni Nakaev (GER)	6
Emad Abouelatta (EGY)	0
Mohammad Naghousi (IRI)	8

Semifinals
Deni Nakaev (GER)	1
Mohammad Naghousi (IRI)	6

=== Bottom half ===
Round of 32
Beka Melelashvili (USA)	9
Daniel Bello (VEN)	0
Vasile Cojoc (ROU)	2
Data Chkhaidze (GEO)	7
Imam Aliev (AIN)	8
Deepak Punia (IND)	0
Huang Kun (CHN)	3
Almir Tolebayev (KAZ)	3
Vladimeri Karchaidze (FRA)	10
Alexander Johansson (SWE)	1
Daizo Tanizaki (JPN)	5
Islam Aliev (POL)	8

Round of 16
Vadzim Paleyenka (AIN)	7
Beka Melelashvili (USA)	12
Data Chkhaidze (GEO)	11
Imam Aliev (AIN)	0
Huang Kun (CHN)	5
Vladimeri Karchaidze (FRA)	0
Islam Aliev (POL)	0
Elmin Aliyev (AZE)	9

Quarterfinals
Beka Melelashvili (USA)	5
Data Chkhaidze (GEO)	2
Huang Kun (CHN)	0
Elmin Aliyev (AZE)	8

Semifinals
Beka Melelashvili (USA)	3
Elmin Aliyev (AZE)	3

=== Repechage ===
Repechage round 1
Evangelos Boukis (GRE)	5
Marek Vrba (CZE)	0
Daniel Bello (VEN)	0
Vadzim Paleyenka (AIN)	9

Repechage round 2
Evangelos Boukis (GRE)	1
Emad Abouelatta (EGY)	11
Vadzim Paleyenka (AIN)	0
Data Chkhaidze (GEO)	7

Bronze medals
Emad Abouelatta (EGY)	1
Deni Nakaev (GER)	5
Data Chkhaidze (GEO)	9
Elmin Aliyev (AZE)	1

== Final standing ==
Rank	Athlete
1st place, gold medalist(s)	Mohammad Naghousi (IRI)
2nd place, silver medalist(s)	Beka Melelashvili (USA)
3rd place, bronze medalist(s)	Deni Nakaev (GER)
3rd place, bronze medalist(s)	Data Chkhaidze (GEO)
5	Emad Abouelatta (EGY)
5	Elmin Aliyev (AZE)
7	Samvel Grigoryan (ARM)
8	Huang Kun (CHN)
9	Vadzim Paleyenka (AIN)
10	Samandar Bobonazarov (UZB)
11	Vladimeri Karchaidze (FRA)
12	Imam Aliev (AIN)
13	Alexandru Solovei (MDA)
14	Evangelos Boukis (GRE)
15	Islam Aliev (POL)
16	Leon Rivalta (ITA)
17	Daizo Tanizaki (JPN)
18	Almir Tolebayev (KAZ)
19	Bekzat Orunkul Uulu (KGZ)
20	Vasile Cojoc (ROU)
21	Ivan Chmyr (UKR)
22	Alexander Johansson (SWE)
23	Yusuf Gölbaşı (TUR)
24	Miklós Királyházi (HUN)
25	Deepak Punia (IND)
26	Marek Vrba (CZE)
27	Daniel Bello (VEN)
