= 2024 Dan Kolov & Nikola Petrov Tournament =

Dan Kolov & Nikola Petrov 2024
- Host city: Sofia, Bulgaria
- Dates: 7–10 March
- Stadium: Levski Sofia Sports Hall

Champions
- Freestyle: Bulgaria
- Greco-Roman: Bulgaria
- Women: Bulgaria

The 61st Dan Kolov & Nikola Petrov Tournament was a wrestling event held in Sofia, Bulgaria between 7 and 10 March 2024. Nearly 200 competitors from 23 countries will take part in the tournament - Iran, France, Italy, Jordan, Kazakhstan, South Korea, Kosovo, Latvia, North Macedonia, Malta, Philippines, Romania, Russia (AIN), Serbia, Tunisia, Ukraine, USA, Algeria, Austria, China, Ecuador, Egypt and Bulgaria.

This international tournament included competition in both men's and women's freestyle wrestling and men's Greco-Roman wrestling. This tournament was held in honor of Dan Kolov who was the first European freestyle wrestling champion from Bulgaria and European and World Champion Nikola Petroff.

== Event videos ==
The event will air freely on the Bulgarian Wrestling Federation YouTube channel.

Broadcasting
7 March 2024 Mat A	7 March 2024 Mat B	7 March 2024 Mat C	7 March 2024 Start list
	7 March 2025 Mat B. Semifinals	7 March 2025 Mat C. Semifinals	7 March 2025 Start List. Semifinals
8 March 2025 Mat A	8 March 2025 Mat B	8 March 2025 Mat C	8 March 2025 Start list
	8 March 2025 Mat B. Semifinals + Finals	8 March 2025 Mat C. Semifinals + Finals	8 March 2025 Start list. Semifinals + Finals
9 March 2025 Mat A	9 March 2025 Mat B	9 March 2025 Mat C	9 March 2025 Start list
	9 March 2025 Mat B. Semifinals + Finals	9 March 2025 Mat C. Semifinals + Finals	9 March 2025 Start list. Semifinals + Finals
	10 March 2025 Mat B. Finals	10 March 2025 Mat C. Finals	10 March 2025 Start list. Finals

== Medal table ==
* Host nation (Bulgaria)

Rank	Nation	Gold	Silver	Bronze	Total
1	Bulgaria*	8	10	11	29
2	Iran	5	1	1	7
3	Ukraine	3	4	4	11
4	South Korea	3	1	2	6
5	Kazakhstan	3	0	4	7
6	United States	2	1	1	4
7	France	1	3	4	8
8	Serbia	1	2	0	3
9	China	1	1	3	5
10	Romania	1	1	1	3
–	Individual Neutral Athletes	1	0	0	1
11	Algeria	0	2	3	5
12	Austria	0	1	1	2
13	Israel	0	1	0	1
13	North Macedonia	0	1	0	1
15	Jordan	0	0	1	1
15	Tunisia	0	0	1	1
Totals (16 entries)		29	29	37	95

== Team ranking ==
Rank	Men's freestyle		Men's Greco-Roman		Women's freestyle	
Rank	Team	Points	Team	Points	Team	Points
1	Bulgaria	150	Bulgaria	153	Bulgaria	180
2	Ukraine	140	Kazakhstan	130	Romania	80
3	South Korea	68	Iran	117	South Korea	65
4	Iran	65	France	72	Serbia	64
5	Austria	41	China	56	China	60
6	North Macedonia	38	Austria	40	France	56
7	Algeria	35	Algeria	31	Algeria	50
8	Serbia	25	United States	28	United States	45
9	United States	25	Ukraine	25	Tunisia	25
10	France	15	Israel	24	Italy	17

== Medal overview ==
=== Men's freestyle ===
Event	Gold	Silver	Bronze
57 kg	Andriy Yatsenko; Ukraine	Roman Hutsuliak; Ukraine	Ivaylo Tisov; Bulgaria
61 kg	Stevan Mićić; Serbia	Yaroslav Hurskyy; Ukraine	Abdelhak Kherbache; Algeria
61 kg	Stevan Mićić; Serbia	Yaroslav Hurskyy; Ukraine	Yasin Rezaei; Iran
65 kg	Abbas Ebrahimzadeh; Iran	Yun Jun-sik; South Korea	Marwane Yezza; France
65 kg	Abbas Ebrahimzadeh; Iran	Yun Jun-sik; South Korea	Taras Markovych; Ukraine
70 kg	Ivan Kusyak; Ukraine	Kaloyan Atanasov; Bulgaria	Nikolay Dimitrov; Bulgaria
74 kg	Ramazan Ramazanov; Bulgaria	Miroslav Kirov; Bulgaria	Vadim Tsurkan; Ukraine
74 kg	Ramazan Ramazanov; Bulgaria	Miroslav Kirov; Bulgaria	Mihail Georgiev; Bulgaria
79 kg	Radomir Stoyanov; Bulgaria	Chems Fetairia; Algeria	Lukas Lins; Austria
86 kg	Alex Dieringer; United States	Mukhammed Aliiev; Ukraine	Valentin Babii; Ukraine
86 kg	Alex Dieringer; United States	Mukhammed Aliiev; Ukraine	Vladyslav Prus; Ukraine
92 kg	Mohammad Mobin Azimi; Iran	Redjep Hajdari; North Macedonia	Not awarded as there were only 2 competitors.
97 kg	Seo Ju-hwan; South Korea	Andriyan Valkanov; Bulgaria	Not awarded as there were only 2 competitors.
125 kg	Georgi Ivanov; Bulgaria	Yurii Idzinskyi; Ukraine	Jung Yei-hyun; South Korea

=== Men's Greco-Roman ===
Event	Gold	Silver	Bronze
55 kg	Marlan Mukashev; Kazakhstan	Stefan Grigorov; Bulgaria	Zhang Haifeng; China
60 kg	Oleksii Masyk; Ukraine	Melkamu Fetene; Israel	Xi Zihao; China
63 kg	Dias Askerbay; Kazakhstan	Avgustin Spasov; Bulgaria	Mukhamedali Mamurbek; Kazakhstan
67 kg	Mamadassa Sylla; France	Yanis Nifri; France	Merey Bekenov; Kazakhstan
67 kg	Mamadassa Sylla; France	Yanis Nifri; France	Dimitar Georgiev; Bulgaria
72 kg	Adilkhan Satayev; Kazakhstan	Mohammad Reza Geraei; Iran	Deyvid Dimitrov; Bulgaria
77 kg	Gholamreza Farrokhi; Iran	Stoyan Kubatov; Bulgaria	Azat Sadykov; Kazakhstan
77 kg	Gholamreza Farrokhi; Iran	Stoyan Kubatov; Bulgaria	Johnny Bur; France
82 kg	Mohammad Naghousi; Iran	Vladimeri Karchaidze; France	Rosian Dermanski; Bulgaria
82 kg	Mohammad Naghousi; Iran	Vladimeri Karchaidze; France	Talas Ashirkhanov; Kazakhstan
87 kg	Semen Novikov; Bulgaria	Yoan Dimitrov; Bulgaria	Sultan Ali Eid; Jordan
97 kg	Amir Reza Akbari; Iran	Markus Ragginger; Austria	Kaloyan Ivanov; Bulgaria
97 kg	Amir Reza Akbari; Iran	Markus Ragginger; Austria	Joe Rau; United States
130 kg	no competitors		

=== Women's freestyle ===
Event	Gold	Silver	Bronze
50 kg	Cheon Mi-ran; South Korea	Ibtissem Doudou; Algeria	Emine Osman; Bulgaria
53 kg	Ekaterina Poleshchuk; Individual Neutral Athletes	Irena Binkova; Bulgaria	Chahinez Rabah; Algeria
53 kg	Ekaterina Poleshchuk; Individual Neutral Athletes	Irena Binkova; Bulgaria	Tatiana Debien; France
55 kg	Sezen Belberova; Bulgaria	Alexandra Hedrick; United States	Mihaela Mihova; Bulgaria
57 kg	Kwon Young-jin; South Korea	Georgiana Lircă; Romania	Zhang Ting; China
57 kg	Kwon Young-jin; South Korea	Georgiana Lircă; Romania	Chaimaa Aouissi; Algeria
59 kg	Evelina Nikolova; Bulgaria	Fatme Shaban; Bulgaria	Desislava Ivanova; Bulgaria
62 kg	Sun Xinyuan; China	Bilyana Dudova; Bulgaria	Amina Capezan; Romania
62 kg	Sun Xinyuan; China	Bilyana Dudova; Bulgaria	Améline Douarre; France
65 kg	Kateryna Zelenykh; Romania	Maša Perović; Serbia	Gergana Stoyanova; Bulgaria
68 kg	Yuliana Yaneva; Bulgaria	Zhang Man; China	Khadija Jlassi; Tunisia
72 kg	Vanesa Georgieva; Bulgaria	Fanni Nađ; Serbia	Not awarded as there were only 2 competitors.
76 kg	Dymond Guilford; United States	Pauline Lecarpentier; France	Hwang Eun-ju; South Korea

== Participating nations ==
185 wrestlers from 21 countries:

1. Individual Neutral Athletes (1)
2. Algeria (10)
3. Austria (8)
4. Bulgaria (62) (Host)
5. China (11)
6. Spain (1)
7. France (12)
8. Iran (9)
9. Israel (3)
10. Italy (2)
11. Jordan (2)
12. Kazakhstan (14)
13. South Korea (7)
14. Latvia (2)
15. North Macedonia (3)
16. Malta (1)
17. Philippines (1)
18. Romania (6)
19. Serbia (6)
20. Tunisia (2)
21. Ukraine (14)
22. United States (8)

== Results ==
Legend

- F — Won by fall
- R — Retired
- WO — Won by walkover

=== Men's freestyle ===
==== Men's freestyle 57 kg ====
Pos	Athlete	Pld	W	L	CP	TP	UKR	BUL	MLT
1	Andriy Yatsenko (UKR)	2	2	0	8	21	—	11–0	10–0
2	Tanyo Tanev (BUL)	2	1	1	3	5	0–4 SU	—	5–2
3	Gary Giordmaina (MLT)	2	0	2	0	9	0–4 SU	1–3 PO1	—

Source: UWW

Pos	Athlete	Pld	W	L	CP	TP	UKR	BUL	BUL
1	Roman Hutsuliak (UKR)	2	2	0	6	7	—	10–0	10–0
2	Ivaylo Tisov (BUL)	2	1	1	6	11	0–4 SU	—	11–0
3	Murad Ilyaz (BUL)	2	0	2	1	2	0–4 SU	0–4 SU	—

Source: UWW

Semifinals
Andriy Yatsenko (UKR)	12
Ivaylo Tisov (BUL)	1
Roman Hutsuliak (UKR)	10
Tanyo Tanev (BUL)	0

Final
Andriy Yatsenko (UKR)	4
Roman Hutsuliak (UKR)	3
Third place
Ivaylo Tisov (BUL)	10
Tanyo Tanev (BUL)	0

==== Men's freestyle 61 kg ====
Quarterfinals		Semifinals		Final
Denis Naim (BUL)	2
Abdelhak Kherbache (ALG)	5	Abdelhak Kherbache (ALG)	0
Yaroslav Hurskyy (UKR)	11	Yaroslav Hurskyy (UKR)	10
Sergey Bonev (BUL)	0			Yaroslav Hurskyy (UKR)	0
Yasin Rezaei (IRI)	6			Stevan Mićić (SRB)	11
Stevan Mićić (SRB)	10	Stevan Mićić (SRB)	11
Besir Alili (MKD)	3	Stilyan Iliev (BUL)	0
Stilyan Iliev (BUL)	10

Bronze medals
Sergey Bonev (BUL)	6
Abdelhak Kherbache (ALG)	11
Yasin Rezaei (IRI)	12
Stilyan Iliev (BUL)	1

==== Men's freestyle 65 kg ====
Quarterfinals		Semifinals		Final
Erdal Galip (BUL)	5
Quentin Sticker (FRA)	8	Quentin Sticker (FRA)	2
Marwane Yezza (FRA)	0	Abbas Ebrahimzadeh (IRI)	13
Abbas Ebrahimzadeh (IRI)	12			Abbas Ebrahimzadeh (IRI)	10
Yun Jun-sik (KOR)	10			Yun Jun-sik (KOR)	0
Taras Markovych (UKR)	1	Yun Jun-sik (KOR)	7
Dmytro Mykhniuk (UKR)	6	Dmytro Mykhniuk (UKR)	0
Ivan Badavrov (BUL)	1

Bronze medals
Marwane Yezza (FRA)	1
Quentin Sticker (FRA)	1
Taras Markovych (UKR)	9
Dmytro Mykhniuk (UKR)	2

==== Men's freestyle 70 kg ====
Pos	Athlete	Pld	W	L	CP	TP	UKR	MKD	AUT	UKR
1	Ivan Kusyak (UKR)	3	3	0	13	21	—	10–0	11–0	WO
2	Marko Andonov (MKD)	3	2	1	8	5	0–4 SU	—	5–2	WO
3	Benedikt Huber (AUT)	3	1	2	6	2	0–4 SU	1–3 PO1	—	WO
—	Oleksandr Yevsieienko (UKR)	3	0	3	0	0	0–5 FO	0–5 FO	0–5 FO	—

Source: UWW

Pos	Athlete	Pld	W	L	CP	TP	BUL	BUL	BUL
1	Kaloyan Atanasov (BUL)	2	2	0	7	15	—	4–0	11–0
2	Nikolay Dimitrov (BUL)	2	1	1	3	7	0–3 PO	—	7–1
3	Bozhidar Dzhorov (BUL)	2	0	2	1	1	0–4 SU	1–3 PO1	—

Source: UWW

Semifinals
Ivan Kusyak (UKR)	4^{F}
Nikolay Dimitrov (BUL)	1
Kaloyan Atanasov (BUL)	10
Marko Andonov (MKD)	0

Final
Ivan Kusyak (UKR)	5
Kaloyan Atanasov (BUL)	0
Third place
Nikolay Dimitrov (BUL)	15
Marko Andonov (MKD)	2

==== Men's freestyle 74 kg ====
Round of 16
Simon Marchl (AUT)	2
Vadym Tsurkan (UKR)	10^{F}

Quarterfinals
Andrii Svyryd (UKR)	1
Vadym Tsurkan (UKR)	10
Ivan Stoyanov (BUL)	0
Ramazan Ramazanov (BUL)	10
Petar Petkov (BUL)	7
Stiliyan Dzhorov (BUL)	5
Miroslav Kirov (BUL)	2
Mihail Georgiev (BUL)	1

Semifinals
Vadym Tsurkan (UKR)	2
Ramazan Ramazanov (BUL)	6
Petar Petkov (BUL)	0
Miroslav Kirov (BUL)	10

Final
Ramazan Ramazanov (BUL)	7
Miroslav Kirov (BUL)	4

Bronze medals
Ivan Stoyanov (BUL)	0
Vadym Tsurkan (UKR)	8
Mihail Georgiev (BUL)	5
Petar Petkov (BUL)	0

==== Men's freestyle 79 kg ====
Pos	Athlete	Pld	W	L	CP	TP	BUL	ALG	AUT
1	Radomir Stoyanov (BUL)	2	2	0	8	20	—	10–0	10–0
2	Chemseddine Fetairia (ALG)	2	1	1	3	9	0–4 SU	—	9–3
3	Lukas Lins (AUT)	2	0	2	1	3	0–4 SU	1–3 PO1	—

Source: UWW

==== Men's freestyle 86 kg ====
Round of 16
Grigor Chernakov (BUL)	0
Kim Gwan-uk (KOR)	11
Alans Amirovs (LAT)	2
Alex Dieringer (USA)	13
Uri Kalashnikov (ISR)	14
Ivars Samušonoks (LAT)	7

Quarterfinals
Valentyn Babii (UKR)	7
Kim Gwan-uk (KOR)	4
Mukhammed Aliiev (UKR)	12
Erzo Isakov (JOR)	5
Slavi Stamenov (BUL)	0
Alex Dieringer (USA)	6^{F}
Uri Kalashnikov (ISR)	6
Vladyslav Prus (UKR)	8

Semifinals
Valentyn Babii (UKR)	3
Mukhammed Aliiev (UKR)	10^{F}
Alex Dieringer (USA)	4^{F}
Vladyslav Prus (UKR)	0

Final
Mukhammed Aliiev (UKR)	0
Alex Dieringer (USA)	10

Repechage round 1
Alans Amirovs (LAT)	10
Slavi Stamenov (BUL)	0

Bronze medals
Erzo Isakov (JOR)	7
Valentyn Babii (UKR)	13
Alans Amirovs (LAT)	0
Vladyslav Prus (UKR)	11

==== Men's freestyle 92 kg ====
Pos	Athlete	Pld	W	L	CP	TP	IRI	MKD
1	Mohammad Mobin Azimi (IRI)	1	1	0	4	11	—	11–0
2	Redjep Hajdari (MKD)	1	0	1	0	0	0–4 SU	—

Source: UWW

==== Men's freestyle 97 kg ====
Pos	Athlete	Pld	W	L	CP	TP	KOR	BUL
1	Seo Ju-hwan (KOR)	1	1	0	12	4	—	12–1
2	Andriyan Valkanov (BUL)	1	0	1	1	1	1–4 SU1	—

Source: UWW

==== Men's freestyle 125 kg ====
Pos	Athlete	Pld	W	L	CP	TP	BUL	UKR	KOR	AUT	BUL
1	Georgi Ivanov (BUL)	4	4	0	15	40	—	10–0	5–0	10–0	15–4
2	Yurii Idzinskyi (UKR)	4	3	1	12	22	0–4 SU	—	13–3	3–1	6–0 Fall
3	Jung Yei-hyun (KOR)	4	2	2	9	7	0–3 PO	1–4 SU1	—	4–1	WO
4	Johannes Ludescher (AUT)	4	1	3	5	6	0–4 SU	1–3 PO1	1–3 PO1	—	4–0
5	Georgi Velev (BUL)	4	0	4	1	4	1–4 SU1	0–5 FA	0–5 IN	0–3 PO	—

Source: UWW

=== Men's Greco-Roman ===
==== Men's Greco-Roman 55 kg ====
Pos	Athlete	Pld	W	L	CP	TP	KAZ	BUL	CHN	BUL	IRI
1	Marlan Mukashev (KAZ)	4	4	0	15	40	—	9–0	5–3	9–0	9–0
2	Stefan Grigorov (BUL)	4	3	1	12	22	0–4 SU	—	8–0	9–0	WO
3	Zhang Haifeng (CHN)	4	2	2	9	7	1–3 PO1	0–4 SU	—	9–0	15–6
4	Yordan Topalov (BUL)	4	1	3	5	6	0–4 SU	0–4 SU	0–4 SU	—	WO
5	Mohammad Hosseinvand (IRI)	4	0	4	1	4	0–4 SU	0–5 IN	1–4 SU1	0–5 IN	—

Source: UWW

==== Men's Greco-Roman 60 kg ====
Pos	Athlete	Pld	W	L	CP	TP	UKR	ISR	KAZ	BUL
1	Oleksii Masyk (UKR)	3	3	0	11	21	—	5–1	7–5	9–4 Fall
2	Melkamu Fetene (ISR)	3	2	1	7	15	1–3 PO1	—	6–2	8–8
3	Olzhas Sultan (KAZ)	3	1	2	5	15	1–3 PO1	1–3 PO1	—	8–1
4	Nedyalko Petrov (BUL)	3	0	3	2	13	0–5 FA	1–3 PO1	1–3 PO1	—

Source: UWW

Pos	Athlete	Pld	W	L	CP	TP	CHN	IRI	KAZ
1	Xi Zihao (CHN)	2	1	1	6	9	—	6–7 Ret	3–5
2	Mohammad Mahdi Farid (IRI)	2	1	1	4	20	0–5 IN	—	13–4
3	Iskhar Kurbayev (KAZ)	2	1	1	4	9	3–1 PO1	1–4 SU1	—

Source: UWW

Semifinals
Oleksii Masyk (UKR)	WO
Mohammad Mahdi Farid (IRI)
Xi Zihao (CHN)	2
Melkamu Fetene (ISR)	3

Final
Oleksii Masyk (UKR)	9
Melkamu Fetene (ISR)	3
Third place
Mohammad Mahdi Farid (IRI)
Xi Zihao (CHN)	WO

==== Men's Greco-Roman 63 kg ====
Pos	Athlete	Pld	W	L	CP	TP	KAZ	BUL	AUT	ALG
1	Mukhamedali Mamurbek (KAZ)	3	3	0	11	25	—	8–0	9–3	8–0
2	Avgustin Spasov (BUL)	3	2	1	8	22	0–4 SU	—	9–0	13–5
3	Aker Al-Obaidi (AUT)	3	1	2	5	13	1–3 PO1	0–4 SU	—	10–0
4	Abdennour Laouni (ALG)	3	0	3	1	5	0–4 SU	1–4 SU1	0–4 SU	—

Source: UWW

Pos	Athlete	Pld	W	L	CP	TP	BUL	KAZ	CHN
1	Grisha Nazaryan (BUL)	2	2	0	8	22	—	13–5	9–0
2	Dias Askerbay (KAZ)	2	1	1	5	14	1–4 SU1	—	9–0
3	Xi Ziyue (CHN)	2	0	2	0	0	0–4 SU	0–4 SU	—

Source: UWW

Semifinals
Mukhamedali Mamurbek (KAZ)	4
Dias Askerbay (KAZ)	13
Grisha Nazaryan (BUL)	2
Avgustin Spasov (BUL)	6

Final
Dias Askerbay (KAZ)	13
Avgustin Spasov (BUL)	4
Third place
Mukhamedali Mamurbek (KAZ)	10
Grisha Nazaryan (BUL)	4

==== Men's Greco-Roman 67 kg ====
Round of 16
David Stepanian (USA)	0
Liu Haonan (CHN)	9
Shon Nadorgin (ISR)	2
Nikalas Sulev (BUL)	7
Mamadassa Sylla (FRA)	10
Dimitar Georgiev (BUL)	1

Quarterfinals
Georgi Anachkov (BUL)	7
Liu Haonan (CHN)	3
Merey Bekenov (KAZ)	1
Yanis Nifri (FRA)	7
Sultan Assetuly (KAZ)	5
Nikalas Sulev (BUL)	1
Mamadassa Sylla (FRA)	5
Fayssal Benfredj (ALG)	0

Semifinals
Georgi Anachkov (BUL)	0
Yanis Nifri (FRA)	8^{F}
Sultan Assetuly (KAZ)	1^{R}
Mamadassa Sylla (FRA)	5

Final
Yanis Nifri (FRA)	4
Mamadassa Sylla (FRA)	9

Repechage round 1
Dimitar Georgiev (BUL)	10
Fayssal Benfredj (ALG)	2

Bronze medals
Merey Bekenov (KAZ)	8
Georgi Anachkov (BUL)	0
Dimitar Georgiev (BUL)	WO
Sultan Assetuly (KAZ)

==== Men's Greco-Roman 72 kg ====
Pos	Athlete	Pld	W	L	CP	TP	IRI	KAZ	ALG	KAZ
1	Mohammad Reza Geraei (IRI)	3	3	0	12	25	—	8–0	8–0	9–0
2	Adilkhan Satayev (KAZ)	3	2	1	7	22	0–4 SU	—	12–4	10–3
3	Abdelmalek Merabet (ALG)	3	1	2	5	14	0–4 SU	1–4 SU1	—	10–2
4	Yerassyl Nurbossynov (KAZ)	3	0	3	2	5	0–4 SU	1–3 PO1	1–4 SU1	—

Source: UWW

Pos	Athlete	Pld	W	L	CP	TP	BUL	BUL	BUL
1	Ivo Iliev (BUL)	2	2	0	6	12	—	5–1	7–0
2	Deyvid Dimitrov (BUL)	2	1	1	4	2	1–3 PO1	—	1–1
3	Spartak Valentinov (BUL)	2	0	2	1	1	0–3 PO	1–3 PO1	—

Source: UWW

Semifinals
Mohammad Reza Geraei (IRI)	11
Deyvid Dimitrov (BUL)	0
Ivo Iliev (BUL)	7
Adilkhan Satayev (KAZ)	15

Final
Mohammad Reza Geraei (IRI)	5
Adilkhan Satayev (KAZ)	4^{F}
Third place
Deyvid Dimitrov (BUL)	WO
Ivo Iliev (BUL)

==== Men's Greco-Roman 77 kg ====
Quarterfinals		Semifinals		Final
Zlatomir Emilov (BUL)	0
Ibrahim Ghanem (FRA)	9	Ibrahim Ghanem (FRA)	1
Azat Sadykov (KAZ)	0	Stoyan Kubatov (BUL)	7
Stoyan Kubatov (BUL)	9			Stoyan Kubatov (BUL)	1
Dimitar Rachev (BUL)	4			Gholamreza Farrokhi (IRI)	5
Omar Satayev (KAZ)	6	Omar Satayev (KAZ)	5
Johnny Bur (FRA)	4	Gholamreza Farrokhi (IRI)	9
Gholamreza Farrokhi (IRI)	8^{F}

Bronze medals
Azat Sadykov (KAZ)	5
Ibrahim Ghanem (FRA)	1
Johnny Bur (FRA)	9
Omar Satayev (KAZ)	2

==== Men's Greco-Roman 82 kg ====
Round of 16
Mohammad Naghousi (IRI)	9
Amar Moumene (ALG)	0

Quarterfinals
Miras Barshylykov (KAZ)	1
Mohammad Naghousi (IRI)	7
Rosian Dermanski (BUL)	8
Azis Atanasov (BUL)	0
Casey Recrosio (USA)	0
Talas Ashirkhanov (KAZ)	9
Vladimeri Karchaidze (FRA)	WO
Almir Tolebayev (KAZ)

Semifinals
Mohammad Naghousi (IRI)	9
Rosian Dermanski (BUL)	6
Talas Ashirkhanov (KAZ)	0
Vladimeri Karchaidze (FRA)	9

Final
Mohammad Naghousi (IRI)	3
Vladimeri Karchaidze (FRA)	3

Repechage round 1
Amar Moumene (ALG)	3
Miras Barshylykov (KAZ)	2

Bronze medals
Amar Moumene (ALG)	3
Rosian Dermanski (BUL)	5
Almir Tolebayev (KAZ)
Talas Ashirkhanov (KAZ)	WO

==== Men's Greco-Roman 87 kg ====
Pos	Athlete	Pld	W	L	CP	TP	BUL	JOR	AUT	USA
1	Yoan Dimitrov (BUL)	3	3	0	11	25	—	10–0	7–0	8–0
2	Sultan Ali Eid (JOR)	3	2	1	7	14	0–4 SU	—	5–3	9–0
3	Lukas Staudacher (AUT)	3	1	2	5	16	0–3 PO	1–3 PO1	—	13–2
4	Patrick Curran (USA)	3	0	3	1	2	0–4 SU	0–4 SU	1–4 SU1	—

Source: UWW

Pos	Athlete	Pld	W	L	CP	TP	BUL	FRA	BUL
1	Semen Novikov (BUL)	2	2	0	7	15	—	6–1	9–1
2	Tourpal Ali Magamadov (FRA)	2	1	1	5	9	1–3 PO1	—	8–0
3	Andrey Atanasov (BUL)	2	0	2	1	1	1–4 SU1	0–4 SU	—

Source: UWW

Semifinals
Yoan Dimitrov (BUL)	8
Tourpal Ali Magamadov (FRA)	4
Semen Novikov (BUL)	12
Sultan Ali Eid (JOR)	1

Final
Yoan Dimitrov (BUL)	1
Semen Novikov (BUL)	7
Third place
Tourpal Ali Magamadov (FRA)	7
Sultan Ali Eid (JOR)	10

==== Men's Greco-Roman 97 kg ====
Round of 16
Markus Ragginger (AUT)	9
Liu Minghao (CHN)	0
Joe Rau (USA)	10
Daniel Gastl (AUT)	0

Quarterfinals
Li Zheng (CHN)	0
Markus Ragginger (AUT)	9
Hristomir Pironkov (BUL)	0
Kaloyan Ivanov (BUL)	8
Wang Zegang (CHN)	1
Amir Reza Akbari (IRI)	7
Joe Rau (USA)	8
George Sikes (USA)	0

Semifinals
Markus Ragginger (AUT)	8
Kaloyan Ivanov (BUL)	0
Amir Reza Akbari (IRI)	10
Joe Rau (USA)	7

Final
Markus Ragginger (AUT)	2
Amir Reza Akbari (IRI)	2

Repechage round 1
Liu Minghao (CHN)
Li Zheng (CHN)	WO

Bronze medals
Li Zheng (CHN)	1
Kaloyan Ivanov (BUL)	1
Wang Zegang (CHN)	2
Joe Rau (USA)	8^{F}

=== Women's freestyle ===
==== Women's freestyle 50 kg ====
Pos	Athlete	Pld	W	L	CP	TP	KOR	ALG	BUL
1	Cheon Mi-ran (KOR)	2	2	0	8	22	—	12–1	10–0
2	Ibtissem Doudou (ALG)	2	1	1	6	9	1–4 SU1	—	8–0 Fall
3	Emine Osman (BUL)	2	0	2	0	0	0–4 SU	0–5 FA	—

Source: UWW

==== Women's freestyle 53 kg ====
Quarterfinals		Semifinals		Final
Nikol Krumova (BUL)	2
Irena Binkova (BUL)	7^{F}	Irena Binkova (BUL)	4^{F}
Yana Dimitrova (BUL)	0	Chahinez Rabah (ALG)	4
Chahinez Rabah (ALG)	11			Irena Binkova (BUL)	0
Tatiana Debien (FRA)	11			Ekaterina Poleshchuk (AIN)	10
Fabiana Rinella (ITA)	2	Tatiana Debien (FRA)	0
Elena Ionescu (ROU)	0	Ekaterina Poleshchuk (AIN)	3
Ekaterina Poleshchuk (AIN)	10

Bronze medals
Nikol Krumova (BUL)	3
Chahinez Rabah (ALG)	4
Elena Ionescu (ROU)	1
Tatiana Debien (FRA)	9

==== Women's freestyle 55 kg ====
Pos	Athlete	Pld	W	L	CP	TP	BUL	USA	BUL
1	Sezen Belberova (BUL)	2	2	0	7	14	—	3–2	11–0
2	Alexandra Hedrick (USA)	2	1	1	5	12	1–3 PO1	—	10–0
3	Mihaela Mihova (BUL)	2	0	2	0	0	0–4 SU	0–4 SU	—

Source: UWW

==== Women's freestyle 57 kg ====
Quarterfinals		Semifinals		Final
Zhang Ting (CHN)	12
Ana Maria Puiu (ROU)	9	Zhang Ting (CHN)	3
Georgiana Lircă (ROU)	11	Georgiana Lircă (ROU)	12
Nesrin Syuleymanova (BUL)	1			Georgiana Lircă (ROU)	9
Chaimaa Aouissi (ALG)	4^{F}			Kwon Young-jin (KOR)	11
Amel Rebiha (FRA)	0	Chaimaa Aouissi (ALG)	2
Jana Petrović (SRB)	2	Kwon Young-jin (KOR)	2^{F}
Kwon Young-jin (KOR)	14

Bronze medals
Nesrin Syuleymanova (BUL)	2
Zhang Ting (CHN)	5^{F}
Jana Petrović (SRB)	5
Chaimaa Aouissi (ALG)	8^{F}

==== Women's freestyle 59 kg ====
Pos	Athlete	Pld	W	L	CP	TP	BUL	BUL	BUL
1	Evelina Nikolova (BUL)	2	2	0	9	16	—	4–0 Fall	12–0
2	Fatme Shaban (BUL)	2	1	1	5	12	0–5 FA	—	12–4 Fall
3	Desislava Ivanova (BUL)	2	0	2	0	4	0–4 SU	0–5 FA	—

Source: UWW

==== Women's freestyle 62 kg ====
Round of 16
Jovana Radivojević (SRB)	2
Siwar Bousetta (TUN)	12
Améline Douarre (FRA)	10
Arian Carpio (PHI)	0
Lydia Pérez (ESP)	0
Sun Xinyuan (CHN)	5

Quarterfinals
Bilyana Dudova (BUL)	5^{F}
Siwar Bousetta (TUN)	0
Hou Jiajing (CHN)	4
Amina Capezan (ROU)	6
Emel Mustafova (BUL)	0
Améline Douarre (FRA)	10
Sun Xinyuan (CHN)	10
Mastoura Soudani (ALG)	0

Semifinals
Bilyana Dudova (BUL)	8
Amina Capezan (ROU)	0
Améline Douarre (FRA)	0
Sun Xinyuan (CHN)	7

Final
Bilyana Dudova (BUL)	2
Sun Xinyuan (CHN)	3

Repechage round 1
Lydia Pérez (ESP)	4
Mastoura Soudani (ALG)	0

Bronze medal match
Siwar Bousetta (TUN)	3
Amina Capezan (ROU)	7
Lydia Pérez (ESP)	1
Améline Douarre (FRA)	2

==== Women's freestyle 65 kg ====
Pos	Athlete	Pld	W	L	CP	TP	ROU	SRB	BUL	BUL
1	Kateryna Zelenykh (ROU)	3	3	0	14	14	—	4–0 Fall	10–0	0–0 3C
2	Maša Perović (SRB)	3	1	2	6	6	0–5 FA	—	3–13	3–1 Fall
3	Gergana Stoyanova (BUL)	3	1	2	5	17	0–4 SU	4–1 SU1	—	4–5
4	Dzhanan Manolova (BUL)	3	1	2	3	6	0–5 CA	0–5 FA	3–1 PO1	—

Source: UWW

==== Women's freestyle 68 kg ====
Pos	Athlete	Pld	W	L	CP	TP	BUL	TUN	ROU	ITA
1	Sofiya Georgieva (BUL)	3	3	0	13	37	—	16–4	11–0 Fall	10–0
2	Khadija Jlassi (TUN)	3	2	1	9	17	1–4 SU1	—	8–3 Fall	5–0
3	Larisa Nițu (ROU)	3	1	2	3	5	0–5 FA	0–5 FA	—	2–2
4	Laura Godino (ITA)	3	0	3	1	2	0–4 SU	0–3 PO	1–3 PO1	—

Source: UWW

Pos	Athlete	Pld	W	L	CP	TP	BUL	CHN	SRB
1	Yuliana Yaneva (BUL)	2	2	0	8	23	—	12–1	11–0
2	Zhang Man (CHN)	2	1	1	5	11	1–4 SU1	—	10–0
3	Emilija Jakovljević (SRB)	2	0	2	0	0	0–4 SU	0–4 SU	—

Source: UWW

Semifinals
Sofiya Georgieva (BUL)	7
Zhang Man (CHN)	8
Yuliana Yaneva (BUL)	10^{F}
Khadija Jlassi (TUN)	0

Final
Zhang Man (CHN)	0
Yuliana Yaneva (BUL)	10
Bronze medal
Sofiya Georgieva (BUL)	3
Khadija Jlassi (TUN)	3

==== Women's freestyle 72 kg ====
Pos	Athlete	Pld	W	L	CP	TP	BUL	SRB	BUL
1	Vanesa Georgieva (BUL)	2	2	0	9	10	—	10–0	WO
2	Fanni Nađ (SRB)	2	1	1	5	0	0–4 SU	—	WO
—	Daniela Brasnarova (BUL)	2	0	2	0	0	0–5 FO	0–5 FO	—

Source: UWW

==== Women's freestyle 76 kg ====
Pos	Athlete	Pld	W	L	CP	TP	USA	FRA	KOR
1	Dymond Guilford (USA)	2	2	0	8	14	—	5–0 Fall	9–0
2	Pauline Lecarpentier (FRA)	2	1	1	3	12	0–5 FA	—	2–1
3	Hwang Eun-ju (KOR)	2	0	2	1	1	0–3 PO	1–3 PO1	—

Source: UWW
