= Moe Kiyooka =

Japanese freestyle wrestler

Moe Kiyooka 清岡もえ
Personal information
- Born: 9 October 2003 (age 23) Kōchi Prefecture, Japan
- Height: 1.60 m (5 ft 3 in)
- Weight: 55 kg (121 lb; 8.7 st)

Sport
- Country: Japan
- Sport: Wrestling
- Weight class: 55 kg
- Event: Freestyle
Medal record
Women's freestyle wrestling
Representing Japan
World Championships
| Gold medal – first place | 2024 Tirana | 55 kg |
| Gold medal – first place | 2026 Astana | 53 kg |
Asian Games
| Gold medal – first place | 2026 Aichi–Nagoya | 53 kg |
Asian Championships
| Gold medal – first place | 2024 Bishkek | 55 kg |
| Silver medal – second place | 2025 Amman | 53 kg |
| Bronze medal – third place | 2026 Bishkek | 53 kg |
Grand Prix
| Gold medal – first place | 2023 Zagreb | 55 kg |
| Gold medal – first place | 2025 Tirana | 53 kg |
World U23 Championships
| Gold medal – first place | 2022 Pontevedra | 55 kg |
World U20 Championships
| Gold medal – first place | 2022 Sofia | 55 kg |
| Bronze medal – third place | 2023 Amman | 55 kg |
World Cadets Championships
| Gold medal – first place | 2019 Sofia | 49 kg |

Moe Kiyooka (born 9 October 2003) is a Japanese freestyle wrestler. She won the gold medal at the 2024 World Wrestling Championships. Her older brother, Kotaro, is an Olympic champion at 65 kilograms.

== Wrestling career ==
She reached the final of the 2024 World Wrestling Championships held in Tirana, Albania, in the women's freestyle 55 kilograms by defeating Macedonian Veronika Ryabovolova 7-0 in the second round, Hungarian Ramóna Galambos 11-0 with technical superiority in the quarter-finals, and Belarusian Iryna Kurachkina, who participated as an Individual Independent, 4-0 in the semifinal. In the final match, she defeated Chinese Zhang Jin with 11-0 technical superiority and won the gold medal.
