= Zhang Jin (wrestler) =

Chinese freestyle wrestler

Personal information
- Born: 1 January 2006 (age 20) China
- Height: 1.62 m (5 ft 4 in)
- Weight: 55 kg (121 lb; 8.7 st)

Sport
- Country: China
- Sport: Wrestling
- Weight class: 55 kg
- Event: Freestyle
Medal record
Women's freestyle wrestling
Representing China
World Championships
Silver medal – second place	2024 Tirana	55 kg
Asian Championships
Gold medal – first place	2026 Bishkek	53 kg
World U20 Championships
Gold medal – first place	2024 Pontevedra	53 kg
Asian U20 Championships
Gold medal – first place	2024 Sriracha	53 kg
Asian U17 Championships
Gold medal – first place	2023 Bishkek	53 kg

Zhang Jin (born 1 January 2006) is a Chinese freestyle wrestler. She won the silver medal at the 2024 World Wrestling Championships.

== Wrestling career ==
Zhang Jin reached the final of the 2024 World Wrestling Championships held in Tirana, Albania, in the women's freestyle 55 kg category by defeating Indian Kirti Jaglan in the first round with a 2-0 pin, Moldovan Iulia Leorda 10-0 in the second round, French Tatiana Debien 11-0 with technical superiority in the quarterfinals, and American Areana Villaescusa 8-0 in the semifinals. She lost to Japanese Moe Kiyooka with 10-0 technical superiority in the final match and won the silver medal.
