= Burcu Kebiç =

Turkish freestyle wrestler (born 1990)

Personal information
- Full name: Burcu Kebiç
- Born: 10 April 1990 (age 36)
- Height: 158 cm (5 ft 2 in)

Sport
- Country: Turkey
- Sport: Wrestling
- Event: Freestyle wrestling
Medal record
Women's freestyle wrestling
Representing Turkey
Mediterranean Games
Silver medal – second place	2013 Mersin	51 kg
Islamic Solidarity Games
Silver medal – second place	2017 Baku	53 kg

Burcu Kebiç (born 10 April 1990) is a Turkish freestyle wrestler. She won the silver medal in the women's 51 kg event at the 2013 Mediterranean Games in Mersin and the silver medal in the women's 53 kg event at the 2017 Islamic Solidarity Games in Baku.
