= Stalvira Orshush =

Russian freestyle wrestler

Personal information
- Native name: Стальвира Степановна Оршуш
- Full name: Stalvira Stepanovna Orshush
- Nationality: (Russia) Russian
- Born: 22 March 1993 (age 33) Ulan-Ude, Buryatia, Russia
- Height: 156 cm (5 ft 1 in)
- Weight: 53 kg (117 lb)

Sport
- Country: Russia; Hungary (since 2023)
- Sport: Wrestling
- Event: Freestyle
- Coached by: M. Molonov and E. Pavlov
Medal record
Women's Freestyle Wrestling
Representing Russia
European Games
Bronze medal – third place	2019 Minsk	53 kg
European Championships
Gold medal – first place	2021 Warsaw	55 kg
Gold medal – first place	2019 Bucharest	53 kg
Gold medal – first place	2018 Kaspiysk	53 kg
Bronze medal – third place	2020 Rome	53 kg
Russian National Women's Freestyle Wrestling Championships
Gold medal – first place	2018 Smolensk	– 53 kg
Gold medal – first place	Kaspiysk 2017	– 53 kg
Silver medal – second place	St. Petersburg 2016	– 53 kg
Golden Grand Prix Ivan Yarygin
Silver medal – second place	2018 Krasnoyarsk	53 kg

Stalvira Stepanovna Orshush (Russian: Стальвира Степановна Оршуш, born 22 April 1993 in Ulan-Ude, Russia) is a Russian freestyle wrestler of Hungarian heritage. Orshush began competing in wrestling in 2011 and since then, she has won various medals at many tournaments. Orshush came in second place and won the silver medal at the 2016 National Championships.

In 2017, Orshush obtained a better result winning the gold medal and taking the first place, making Orshush a part of the Russian national team. She won the silver medal at the Ivan Yarygin 2018 Golden Grand Prix, held in Krasnoyarsk.

In 2018, Orshush won the gold medal in the 55 kg category at the 2018 Klippan Lady Open.

Her biggest achievement was winning the gold medal at the 2018 European Wrestling Championships by defeating the two-world champion Vanesa Kaladzinskaya of Belarus by fall in the final. Orshush became a two-time Russian national champion in 2018, by defeating Kuular of Kemerovo by 11-0 technical fall.

In March 2021, Orshush competed at the European Qualification Tournament in Budapest, Hungary hoping to qualify for the 2020 Summer Olympics in Tokyo, Japan.

Orshush lost her bronze medal match in the women's 53 kg event at the 2024 European Wrestling Championships held in Bucharest, Romania. She competed at the 2024 European Wrestling Olympic Qualification Tournament in Baku, Azerbaijan hoping to qualify for the 2024 Summer Olympics in Paris, France. She was eliminated in her first match and she did not qualify for the Olympics.

She is of Magyar descent.
