= Aysun Erge =

Turkish freestyle wrestler (born 1993)

Personal information
- Nationality: Turkish
- Height: 153 cm (5 ft 0 in)

Sport
- Country: Turkey
- Sport: Wrestling
- Event: Freestyle wrestling
Medal record
Women's freestyle wrestling
Representing Turkey
Mediterranean Games
Silver medal – second place	2018 Tarragona	53 kg
World University Championships
Bronze medal – third place	2016 Çorum	53 kg

Aysun Erge is a Turkish freestyle wrestler. She won the silver medal in the women's 53 kg event at the 2018 Mediterranean Games in Tarragona and the bronze medal at the 2016 World University Wrestling Championships in Çorum.
