= Natalia Malysheva =

Russian freestyle wrestler

Personal information
- Native name: Наталья Юрьевна Малышева
- Nationality: Russian
- Born: 2 January 1994 (age 32) Abakan, Khakassia, Russia
- Height: 160 cm (5 ft 3 in)

Sport
- Country: Russia
- Sport: Amateur wrestling
- Weight class: 53 kg
- Event: Freestyle
- Coached by: Leonind Butanaev; Vladimir Chuchunov
Medal record
Women's freestyle wrestling
Representing United World Wrestling
European Championships
Bronze medal – third place	2025 Bratislava	53 kg
Representing Individual Neutral Athletes
Yasar Dogu Tournament
Bronze medal – third place	2024 Antalya	53 kg
Representing Russia
European Championships
Silver medal – second place	2017 Novi Sad	53 kg
Golden Grand Prix Ivan Yarygin
Silver medal – second place	2019 Krasnoyarsk	53 kg
Bronze medal – third place	2018 Krasnoyarsk	53 kg
Yasar Dogu Tournament
Silver medal – second place	2017 Istanbul	53 kg

Natalia Yurievna Malysheva (born 2 January 1994) is a Russian freestyle wrestler. She is a silver medalist at the European Wrestling Championships. She is a four-time Russian national champion.

== Career ==
In 2014, Malysheva competed in the women's freestyle 53 kg event at the World Wrestling Championships held in Tashkent, Uzbekistan. She also competed in the women's freestyle 53 kg event at the 2015 World Wrestling Championships held in Las Vegas, United States where she was eliminated in her first match.

At the 2017 European Wrestling Championships held in Novi Sad, Serbia, she won the silver medal in the women's 53 kg event.

In 2018, Malysheva won one of the bronze medals in the women's 53 kg event at the Klippan Lady Open in Klippan, Sweden.

Malysheva lost her bronze medal match in the women's 53 kg event at the 2024 European Wrestling Championships held in Bucharest, Romania. She competed at the 2024 European Wrestling Olympic Qualification Tournament in Baku, Azerbaijan and she earned a quota place for the Individual Neutral Athletes for the 2024 Summer Olympics in Paris, France.

In July 2024, the Russian Wrestling Federation announced that Russian wrestlers would not take part after a unanimous decision to refuse to participate.

== Achievements ==
Year	Tournament	Location	Result	Event
2017	European Championships	Novi Sad, Serbia	2nd	Freestyle 53 kg
2025	European Championships	Bratislava, Slovakia	3rd	Freestyle 53 kg
