= Vanesa Kaladzinskaya =

Belarusian freestyle wrestler

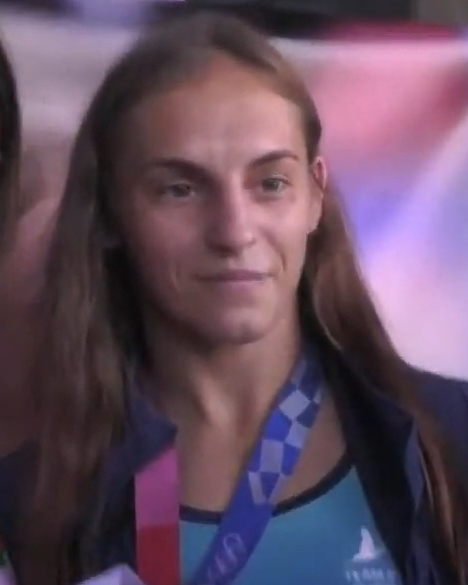
- Kaladzinskaya in 2021

Personal information
- Native name: Ванеса Каладзінская
- Nationality: Belarus
- Born: 27 December 1992 (age 33) Babruysk, Belarus
- Height: 161 cm (5 ft 3 in)

Sport
- Country: Belarus
- Sport: Wrestling
- Weight class: 53 kg
- Event: Freestyle
- Coached by: Sergey Smal
Medal record
Women's freestyle wrestling
Representing Individual Neutral Athletes
World Championships
Silver medal – second place	2023 Belgrade	53 kg
European Championships
Gold medal – first place	2024 Bucharest	53 kg
Representing Belarus
Olympic Games
Bronze medal – third place	2020 Tokyo	53 kg
World Championships
Gold medal – first place	2012 Strathcona County	48 kg
Gold medal – first place	2017 Paris	53 kg
European Championships
Gold medal – first place	2017 Novi Sad	53 kg
Gold medal – first place	2020 Rome	53 kg
Silver medal – second place	2018 Kaspiysk	53 kg
Bronze medal – third place	2019 Bucharest	53 kg

Vanesa Valerieuna Kaladzinskaya (Belarusian: Ванэса Валер'еўна Каладзінская; born 27 December 1992, in Babruysk) is a Belarusian freestyle wrestler. She competed in the freestyle 48 kg event at the 2012 Summer Olympics; after defeating Zhuldyz Eshimova in the 1/8 finals, she was eliminated by Carol Huynh in the quarterfinals.

In March 2021, she qualified at the European Qualification Tournament to compete at the 2020 Summer Olympics in Tokyo, Japan. She won one of the bronze medals in the women's 53 kg event at the 2020 Summer Olympics held in Tokyo, Japan.

She won the gold medal in the women's 53 kg event at the 2024 European Wrestling Championships held in Bucharest, Romania. In the final, she defeated Jonna Malmgren of Sweden.
