= Maria Prevolaraki =

Greek freestyle wrestler

Personal information
- Born: 21 December 1991 (age 34) Athens, Greece
- Height: 163 cm (5 ft 4 in)

Sport
- Weight class: 53–60 kg (117–132 lb)
- Coached by: Panagiotis Argoudea
Medal record
Women's freestyle wrestling
Representing Greece
World Championships
Bronze medal – third place	2012 Strathcona County	55 kg
Bronze medal – third place	2017 Paris	53 kg
Bronze medal – third place	2022 Belgrade	53 kg
European Championships
Gold medal – first place	2025 Bratislava	53 kg
Silver medal – second place	2013 Tbilisi	55 kg
Silver medal – second place	2014 Vantaa	53 kg
Silver medal – second place	2021 Warsaw	53 kg
Silver medal – second place	2022 Budapest	53 kg
Bronze medal – third place	2017 Novi Sad	53 kg
Bronze medal – third place	2018 Kaspiysk	53 kg
Bronze medal – third place	2023 Zagreb	53 kg
Bronze medal – third place	2024 Bucharest	53 kg
Individual World Cup
Gold medal – first place	2020 Belgrade	53 kg
World Beach Wrestling Championships
Gold medal – first place	2014 Katerini	60 kg
Mediterranean Games
Gold medal – first place	2013 Mersin	55 kg
Gold medal – first place	2018 Tarragona	53 kg
Gold medal – first place	2022 Oran	53 kg

Maria Prevolaraki (Greek: Μαρία Πρεβολαράκη; born 21 December 1991 in Athens) is a Greek freestyle wrestler. She competed in the freestyle 55 kg event at the 2012 Summer Olympics and was eliminated by Yuliya Ratkevich in the 1/8 finals. That year, she also won a bronze medal at the World Championships.

She won silver at the 2013 and 2014 European Championships.

In 2014, she also became World Champion in Beach Wrestling, winning the gold medal in the women's 60 kg event at the World Beach Wrestling Championships in Katerini, Greece.

At the 2016 Summer Olympics in Rio de Janeiro, she advanced until the quarter-finals, taking 10th place.

In 2017, she won bronze at both World and European Championships.

At the 2018 European Championships, Prevolaraki won one of the two bronze medals in her division.

In 2020, she won the gold medal in the women's 53 kg event at the Individual Wrestling World Cup held in Belgrade, Serbia. In 2021, she was eliminated in her first match in the women's 53 kg event at the 2020 Summer Olympics held in Tokyo, Japan. That year, she won silver in the European Championships.

In February 2022, she won the gold medal in the 53 kg event at the Dan Kolov & Nikola Petrov Tournament held in Veliko Tarnovo, Bulgaria. In April 2022, she won the silver medal in the women's 53 kg event at the European Wrestling Championships held in Budapest, Hungary. A few months later, she won the gold medal in the 53 kg event at the 2022 Mediterranean Games held in Oran, Algeria. She won one of the bronze medals in the 53 kg event at the 2022 World Wrestling Championships held in Belgrade, Serbia.

In February 2024, Prevolaraki won one of the bronze medals in the 53 kg event at the 2024 European Wrestling Championships in Bucharest, Romania. She defeated Natalia Malysheva in her bronze medal match. Prevolaraki competed at the 2024 European Wrestling Olympic Qualification Tournament in Baku, Azerbaijan to qualify for the 2024 Summer Olympics in Paris, France. She was eliminated in her second match. Later, it was announced that Prevolaraki had qualified to the Olympics due to the reallocation of an Independent Neutral Athlete. She competed in the women's 53 kg event at the Olympics.

In 2025, Prevolaraki won the gold medal in the 53 kg event at the European Wrestling Championships held in Bratislava, Slovakia.
