= Annika Wendle =

German freestyle wrestler

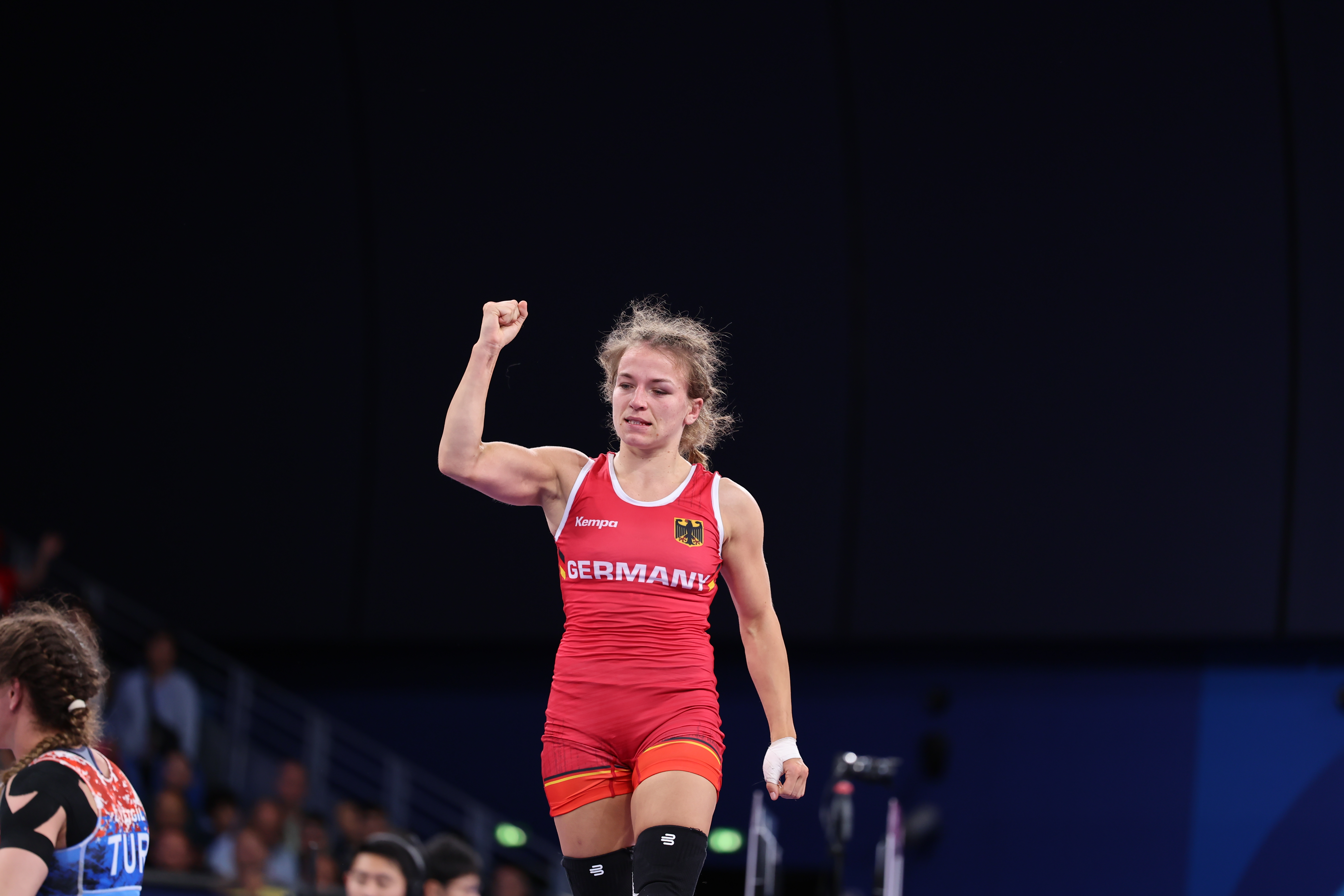
- Wendle at the 2024 Summer Olympics

Personal information
- Born: 15 September 1997 (age 28)
- Height: 159 cm (5 ft 3 in)

Sport
- Country: Germany
- Sport: Amateur wrestling
- Weight class: 53 kg
- Event: Freestyle
Medal record
Women's freestyle wrestling
Representing Germany
European Championships
Bronze medal – third place	2020 Rome	53 kg
Bronze medal – third place	2021 Warsaw	53 kg
Individual World Cup
Silver medal – second place	2020 Belgrade	55 kg

Annika Wendle (born 15 September 1997 in Lahr) is a German freestyle wrestler. She is a two-time bronze medalist at the European Wrestling Championships. She won a silver medal at the 2020 Individual Wrestling World Cup held in Belgrade, Serbia. Wendle represented Germany at the 2024 Summer Olympics in Paris, France.

== Career ==
Wendle won the silver medal in the women's 53 kg event at the 2018 World University Wrestling Championships held in Goiânia, Brazil.

In 2019, Wendle competed in the 53 kg event at the European Wrestling Championships held in Bucharest, Romania where she was eliminated in her first match by Jessica Blaszka of the Netherlands. Blaszka went on to win one of the bronze medals in that event. In that same year, Wendle also competed in the 55 kg event at the 2019 World Wrestling Championships held in Nur-Sultan, Kazakhstan without winning a medal.

In 2020, Wendle won one of the bronze medals in the 53 kg event at the European Wrestling Championships held in Rome, Italy. In the same year, she also won the silver medal in the women's 55 kg event at the 2020 Individual Wrestling World Cup held in Belgrade, Serbia. In the final, she lost against Iryna Kurachkina of Belarus. In April 2021, Wendle won one of the bronze medals in the 53 kg event at the European Wrestling Championships held in Warsaw, Poland. In May 2021, she failed to qualify for the Olympics at the World Olympic Qualification Tournament held in Sofia, Bulgaria. In October 2021, she was eliminated in her first match in the women's 53 kg event at the 2021 World Wrestling Championships held in Oslo, Norway.

Wendle competed in the women's 53 kg event at the 2022 European Wrestling Championships held in Budapest, Hungary where she was eliminated in her first match. She won one of the bronze medals in the women's 53 kg event at the Grand Prix de France Henri Deglane 2023 held in Nice, France.

In 2024, Wendle competed in the women's 53 kg event at the European Wrestling Championships held in Bucharest, Romania where she was eliminated in her first match. She competed at the 2024 European Wrestling Olympic Qualification Tournament in Baku, Azerbaijan hoping to qualify for the 2024 Summer Olympics in Paris, France. Wendle was eliminated in her third match and she did not qualify for the Olympics. She also failed to qualify at the 2024 World Wrestling Olympic Qualification Tournament held in Istanbul, Turkey.

In July 2024, the Russian Wrestling Federation announced that Russian wrestlers would not take part after a unanimous decision to refuse to participate and Wendle was able to compete at the Olympics as a result. In August 2024, she competed in the women's 53 kg event at the Olympics. She lost her bronze medal match against Choe Hyo-gyong of North Korea.

== Achievements ==
Year	Tournament	Location	Result	Event
2020	European Championships	Rome, Italy	3rd	Freestyle 53 kg
2021	European Championships	Warsaw, Poland	3rd	Freestyle 53 kg
