= Lilya Horishna =

Ukrainian freestyle wrestler

Personal information
- Native name: Ліля Горішна
- Born: 28 December 1994 (age 31)
- Height: 163 cm (5 ft 4 in)

Sport
- Club: "Spartak", Lviv
Medal record
Women's freestyle wrestling
Representing Ukraine
European Championships
Silver medal – second place	2019 Bucharest	53 kg

Lilya Horishna (Ukrainian: Ліля Горішна; born 28 December 1994) is a Ukrainian freestyle wrestler. She is a member of Spartak Lviv sports club. She is 2019 European championships silver medalist.

In 2015, she competed in the women's freestyle 53 kg event at the 2015 World Wrestling Championships held in Las Vegas, United States.
