= Jonna Malmgren =

Swedish freestyle wrestler

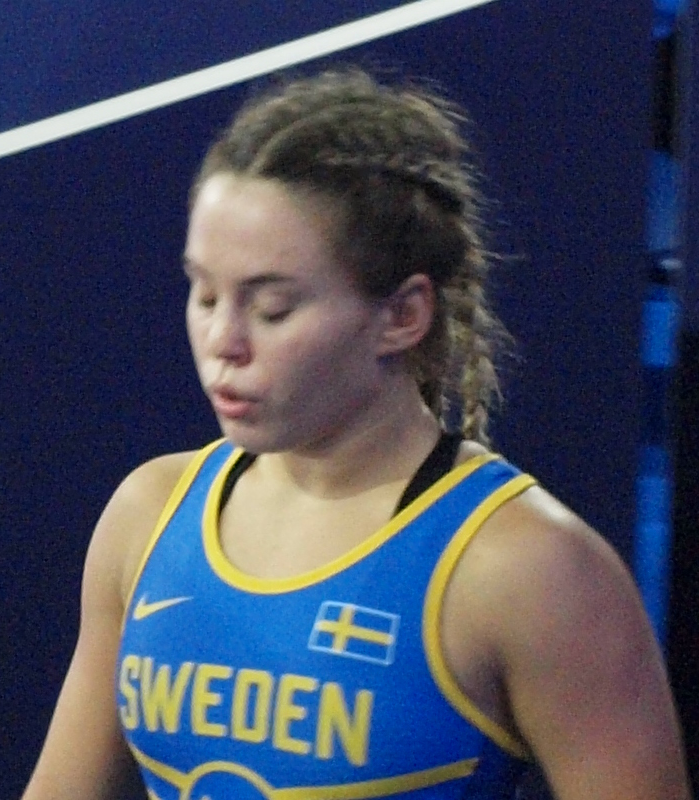

Personal information
- Full name: Emma Jonna Denise Malmgren
- Born: 21 June 2001 (age 25) Sweden
- Height: 1.55 m (5 ft 1 in)
- Weight: 53 kg (117 lb)

Sport
- Country: Sweden
- Sport: Women's freestyle wrestling
- Event: 53 kg
Medal record
Women's freestyle wrestling
Representing Sweden
World Championships
Bronze medal – third place	2026 Astana	53 kg
European Championships
Gold medal – first place	2022 Budapest	53 kg
Gold medal – first place	2023 Zagreb	53 kg
Silver medal – second place	2024 Bucharest	53 kg
Grand Prix
Gold medal – first place	2022 Madrid	53 kg
Gold medal – first place	2023 Klippan	53 kg
Bronze medal – third place	2020 Klippan	53 kg
European U23 Championship
Gold medal – first place	2023 Bucharest	55 kg
Gold medal – first place	2024 Baku	55 kg
World U23 Championship
Gold medal – first place	2024 Tirana	55 kg
World Juniors Championships
Gold medal – first place	2021 Ufa	53 kg
European Juniors Championships
Bronze medal – third place	2019 Pontevedra	53 kg
Summer Youth Olympics
Gold medal – first place	2018 Buenos Aires	49 kg

Jonna Malmgren (born 21 June 2001) is a Swedish freestyle wrestler competing in the 53 kg division. She won the gold medal in the 2022 and 2023 European Wrestling Championships held in Zagreb, Croatia.

== Career ==
Malmgren won the gold medal by defeating her Greek rival Maria Prevolaraki 3–2 in the women's freestyle 53 kg final at the 2022 European Wrestling Championships in Budapest, Hungary.

In 2023, Malmgren won the gold medal in the women's freestyle 53 kg event at the 2023 European Wrestling Championships held in Zagreb, Croatia. She defeated Zeynep Yetgil of Turkey 11–6 in the quarterfinals, Turkan Nasirova of Azerbaijan 4–2 in the semifinals and Stalvira Orshush of Hungary 9–3 in the final to win the gold medal.

She won the silver medal in the women's 53 kg event at the 2024 European Wrestling Championships held in Bucharest, Romania. In August 2024, Malmgren competed in the women's 53 kg event at the Summer Olympics in Paris, France. She was eliminated in her second match by Pang Qianyu of China. Pang Qianyu went on to win one of the bronze medals in the event.

== Achievements ==
Year	Tournament	Location	Result	Event
2022	European Championships	Budapest, Hungary	1st	Freestyle 53 kg
2023	European Championships	Zagreb, Croatia	1st	Freestyle 53 kg
2024	European Championships	Bucharest, Romania	2nd	Freestyle 53 kg
2026	World Championships	Astana, Kazakhstan	3rd	Freestyle 53 kg
