= Katarzyna Krawczyk =

Polish freestyle wrestler (born 1990)

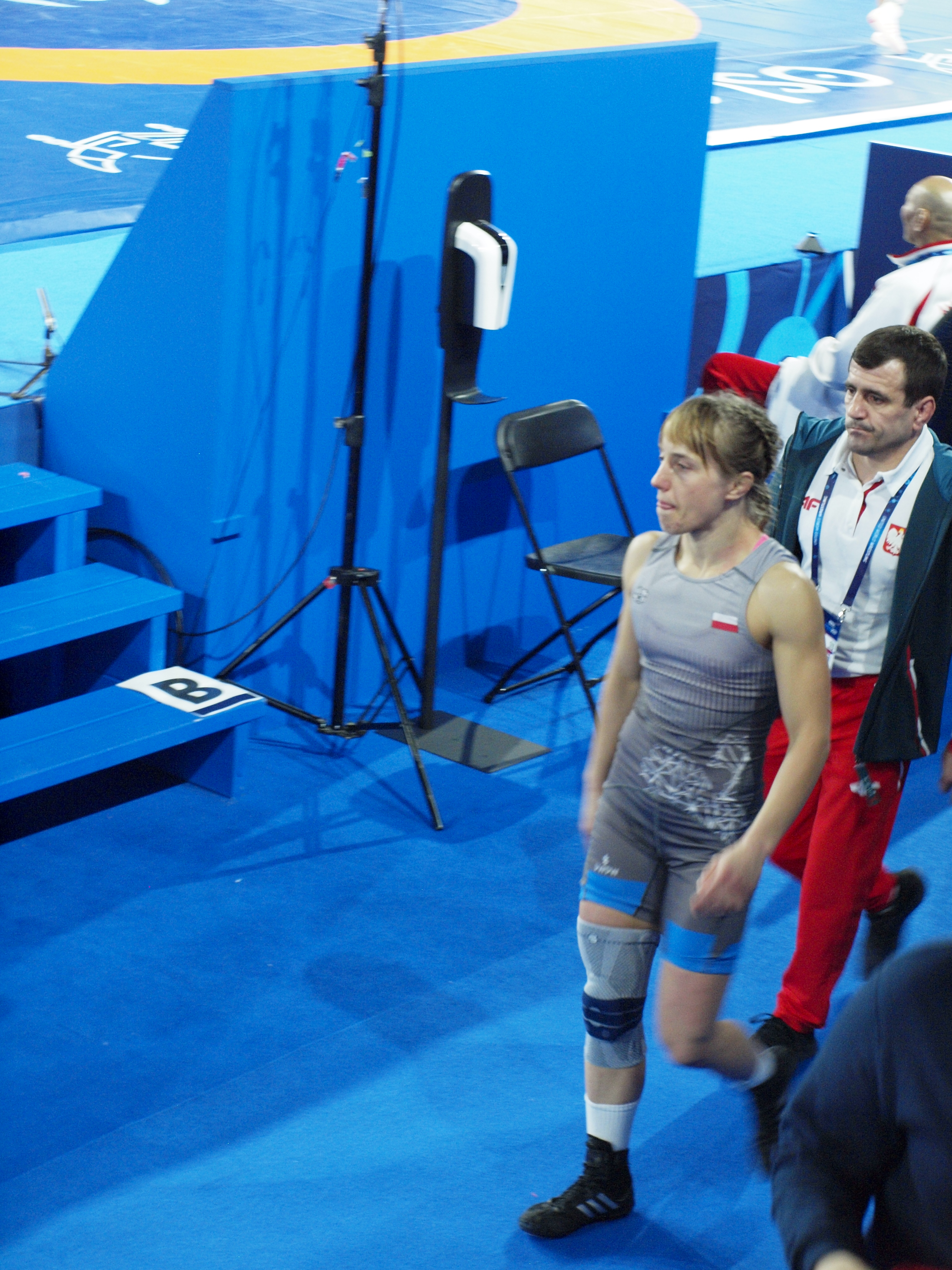
- Katarzyna Krawczyk at the 2021 World Wrestling Championships in Oslo, Norway

Personal information
- Born: 6 September 1990 (age 35) Mikołajki, Poland
Medal record
Women's freestyle wrestling
Representing Poland
World Championships
Bronze medal – third place	2021 Oslo	53 kg
European Championships
Bronze medal – third place	2011 Dortmund	55 kg
Bronze medal – third place	2018 Kaspiysk	53 kg
Bronze medal – third place	2022 Budapest	53 kg
Bronze medal – third place	2023 Zagreb	55 kg
Individual World Cup
Bronze medal – third place	2020 Belgrade	55 kg
Military World Games
Bronze medal – third place	2019 Wuhan	57 kg
European Games
Silver medal – second place	2015 Baku	55 kg
Yasar Dogu Tournament
Silver medal – second place	2022 Istanbul	55 kg

Katarzyna Krawczyk (born 6 September 1990) is a Polish freestyle wrestler. She is a bronze medalist at the World Wrestling Championships and a four-time bronze medalist at the European Wrestling Championships. She competed in the women's freestyle 53 kg event at the 2016 Summer Olympics, in which she was eliminated in the quarterfinals by Sofia Mattsson.

== Career ==
Krawczyk competed in the women's 53 kg event at the 2015 World Wrestling Championships held in Las Vegas, United States.

In 2020, Krawczyk won one of the bronze medals in the women's 55 kg event at the Individual Wrestling World Cup held in Belgrade, Serbia. In 2021, she won one of the bronze medals in her event at the 2021 Poland Open held in Warsaw, Poland.

In 2022, Krawczyk won the silver medal in the women's 55 kg event at the Yasar Dogu Tournament held in Istanbul, Turkey. In April 2022, she won one of the bronze medals in the women's 53 kg event at the European Wrestling Championships held in Budapest, Hungary. A few months later, she won the gold medal in her event at the Matteo Pellicone Ranking Series 2022 held in Rome, Italy. She competed in the 53 kg event at the 2022 World Wrestling Championships held in Belgrade, Serbia.

== Achievements ==
Year	Tournament	Location	Result	Event
2011	European Championships	Dortmund, Germany	3rd	Freestyle 55 kg
2018	European Championships	Kaspiysk, Russia	3rd	Freestyle 53 kg
2019	Military World Games	Wuhan, China	3rd	Freestyle 57 kg
2021	World Championships	Oslo, Norway	3rd	Freestyle 53 kg
2022	European Championships	Budapest, Hungary	3rd	Freestyle 53 kg
2023	European Championships	Zagreb, Croatia	3rd	Freestyle 55 kg
