= Zeynep Yetgil =

Turkish freestyle wrestler

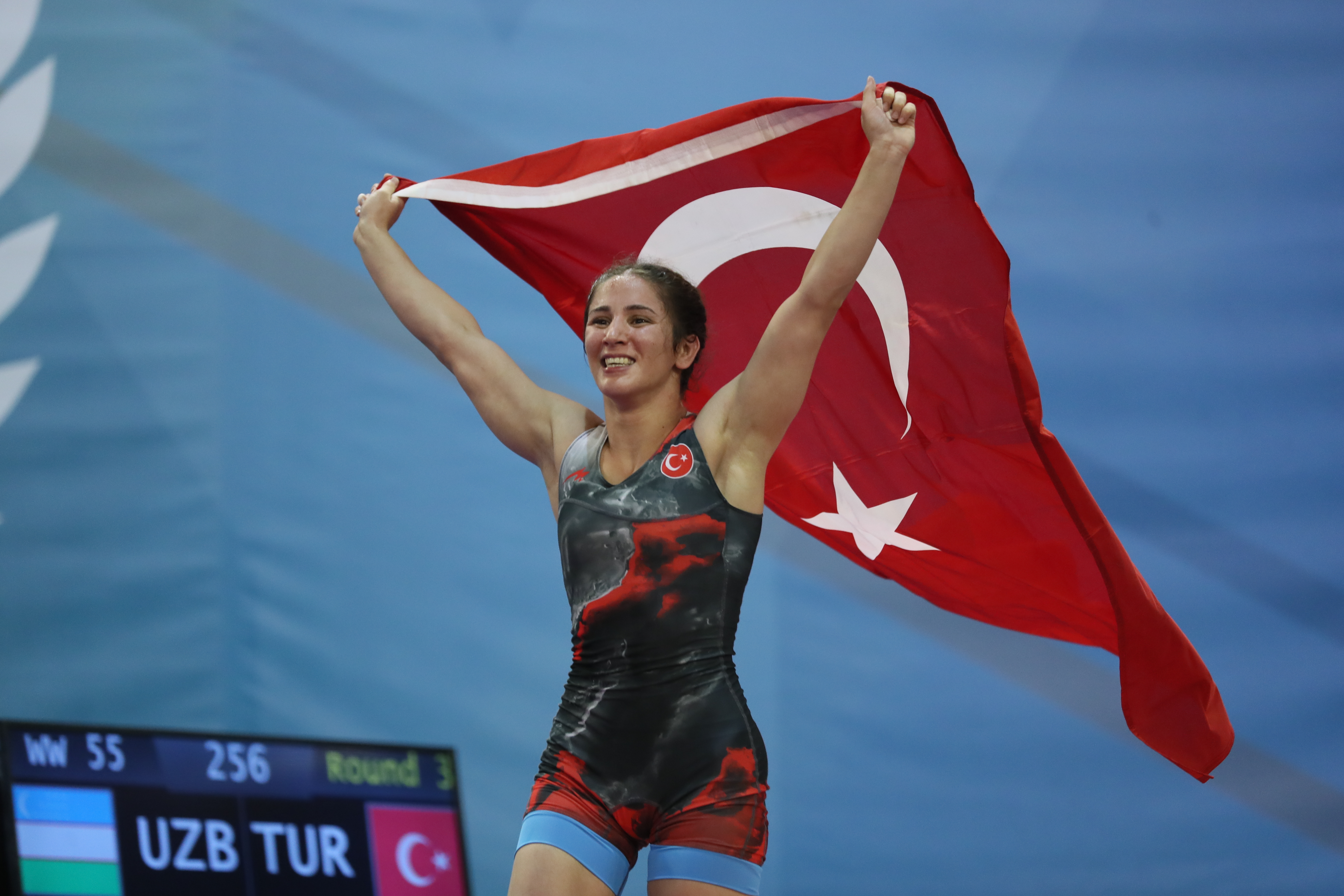
- Yetgil at the 2021 Islamic Solidarity Games

Personal information
- Nationality: Turkish
- Born: 10 October 2000 (age 25) Erzurum, Turkey
- Education: Bartın University
- Height: 165 cm (5 ft 5 in)
- Weight: 53 kg (117 lb)

Sport
- Country: Turkey
- Sport: Women's freestyle wrestling
- Event: 53 kg
- Club: Istanbul BB SK
Medal record
Women's freestyle wrestling
Representing Turkey
European Championships
Bronze medal – third place	2023 Zagreb	53 kg
Bronze medal – third place	2024 Bucharest	53 kg
Bronze medal – third place	2025 Bratislava	53 kg
Islamic Solidarity Games
Gold medal – first place	2021 Konya	55 kg
Mediterranean Games
Gold medal – first place	2026 Taranto	53 kg
Silver medal – second place	2022 Oran	53 kg
Yasar Dogu Tournament
Silver medal – second place	2024 Antalya	53 kg
Bronze medal – third place	2020 Istanbul	53 kg
World U23 Championships
Bronze medal – third place	2019 Budapest	53 kg
Bronze medal – third place	2021 Belgrade	53 kg
Bronze medal – third place	2022 Pontevedra	53 kg
European U23 Championships
Gold medal – first place	2018 Istanbul	53 kg
Gold medal – first place	2023 Bucharest	53 kg
Silver medal – second place	2021 Skopje	53 kg
Bronze medal – third place	2019 Novi Sad	53 kg
Bronze medal – third place	2022 Plovdiv	55 kg
European Juniors Championships
Gold medal – first place	2018 Rome	53 kg
Silver medal – second place	2019 Pontevedra	53 kg
World Cadets Championships
Bronze medal – third place	2016 Tbilisi	49 kg
Bronze medal – third place	2017 Athens	49 kg
European Cadets Championships
Silver medal – second place	2017 Sarajevo	52 kg

Zeynep Yetgil (born 10 October 2000) is a Turkish freestyle wrestler competing in the 53 kg division. She is a member of Istanbul BB SK.

== Sports career ==
Zeynep Yetgil wins bronze medal at the Junior Wrestling World Championships. Competing in women's 48 kg at the 2017 Junior Wrestling World Championships, held in Finland, Zeynep Yetgil won bronze medal after beating her Tunisian opponent Sarra Hamdi 8–6.

2018 Junior European Wrestling Championships in Rome, Italy.Competing in women's 53 kg category, Zeynep Yetgil defeated her Azerbaijani opponent Tatyana Varansova and won the title.

In November 2021, she won one of the bronze medals in the 53 kg event at the 2021 U23 World Wrestling Championships held in Belgrade, Serbia.

She won one of the bronze medals in the 55 kg event at the 2022 European U23 Wrestling Championship held in Plovdiv, Bulgaria. A few months later, she won the silver medal in the 53 kg event at the 2022 Mediterranean Games held in Oran, Algeria. A few months later, she won the gold medal in the 55 kg event at the 2021 Islamic Solidarity Games held in Konya, Türkiye. She competed in the 53 kg event at the 2022 World Wrestling Championships held in Belgrade, Serbia.

In 2023, she won the gold medal in her event at the 2023 European U23 Wrestling Championships held in Bucharest, Romania. She won one of the bronze medals in the women's freestyle 53 kg event at the 2023 European Wrestling Championships held in Zagreb, Croatia. Zeynep Yetgil, starting the championship from the qualifying round, defeated Polish Roksana Zasina 10-0 and reached the quarterfinals. Zeynep, who competed against Sweden's Jonna Malmgren in the quarterfinals, left the mat 11-6 defeated, but after her opponent reached the final, she earned the right to compete for the bronze medal. In the bronze medal match, she won the bronze medal by defeating her Azerbaijani rival Türkan Nasirova 10–0.

She won one of the bronze medals in the women's 53 kg event at the 2024 European Wrestling Championships held in Bucharest, Romania. She competed at the 2024 European Wrestling Olympic Qualification Tournament in Baku, Azerbaijan hoping to qualify for the 2024 Summer Olympics in Paris, France. She qualified at the 2024 World Wrestling Olympic Qualification Tournament held in Istanbul, Turkey. She competed in the women's 53 kg event at the Olympics. She was eliminated in her second match by Annika Wendle of Germany.
