= Tatiana Debien =

French freestyle wrestler

Personal information
- Full name: Tatiana Debien Salah
- Born: 30 January 1991 (age 35) Novoalexandrovsk, Stavropol Krai, Russia
- Height: 1.62 m (5 ft 4 in)
- Weight: 55 kg (121 lb)

Sport
- Country: France
- Sport: Women's freestyle wrestling
- Weight class: 53 kg
Medal record
Women's freestyle wrestling
Representing France
World Championships
Bronze medal – third place	2024 Tirana	55 kg
European Championships
Silver medal – second place	2025 Bratislava	55 kg
Bronze medal – third place	2023 Zagreb	55 kg
Mediterranean Games
Bronze medal – third place	2022 Oran	57 kg
Bronze medal – third place	2026 Taranto	53 kg
Dan Kolov - Nikola Petrov Tournament
Bronze medal – third place	2022 Veliko Tarnovo	53 kg
Bronze medal – third place	2024 Sofia	53 kg
Grand Prix
Gold medal – first place	2024 Madrid	55 kg
Gold medal – first place	2025 Nice	55 kg
Gold medal – first place	2025 Zagreb	55 kg

Tatiana Debien (born 30 January 1991) is a Russian-born French freestyle wrestler competing in the 55 kg division.

== Career ==
In 2023, she won a bronze medal in the women's freestyle 55 kg event at the 2023 European Wrestling Championships held in Zagreb, Croatia. She competed in the women's 53 kg event at the 2024 European Wrestling Championships held in Bucharest, Romania.

Debien competed at the 2024 European Wrestling Olympic Qualification Tournament in Baku, Azerbaijan hoping to qualify for the 2024 Summer Olympics in Paris, France. She was eliminated in her first match and she did not qualify for the Olympics.

== Achievements ==
Year	Tournament	Location	Result	Event
2022	Mediterranean Games	Oran, Algeria	3rd	Freestyle 57 kg
2023	European Championships	Zagreb, Croatia	3rd	Freestyle 55 kg
2024	World Championships	Tirana, Albania	3rd	Freestyle 55 kg
2025	European Championships	Bratislava, Slovakia	2nd	Freestyle 55 kg
2026	Mediterranean Games	Taranto, Italy	3rd	Freestyle 53 kg
