= Iulia Leorda =

Moldovan wrestler

Medal record

Women's freestyle wrestling

Representing Moldova

World Championships
Silver medal – second place	2021 Oslo	53 kg

European Championships
Bronze medal – third place	2021 Warsaw	53 kg
Bronze medal – third place	2022 Budapest	53 kg

Yasar Dogu Tournament
Bronze medal – third place	2022 Istanbul	53 kg

Youth Olympic Games
Silver medal – second place	2010 Singapore	46 kg

Leorda at the 2021 World Wrestling Championships – Day 4

Iulia Leorda (born 18 July 1994) is a Moldovan wrestler. She won the silver medal in the women's 53 kg event at the 2021 World Wrestling Championships held in Oslo, Norway. She is also a two-time bronze medalist at the European Wrestling Championships. She also competed at the 2010 Summer Youth Olympics in Singapore.

== Career ==
Leorda won the silver medal in the girls' freestyle 46 kg event, losing to Yu Miyahara of Japan in the final.

In March 2021, Leorda competed at the European Qualification Tournament in Budapest, Hungary hoping to qualify for the 2020 Summer Olympics in Tokyo, Japan.

In 2022, Leorda won one of the bronze medals in the women's 53 kg event at the Yasar Dogu Tournament held in Istanbul, Turkey. In April 2022, she won one of the bronze medals in the women's 53 kg event at the European Wrestling Championships held in Budapest, Hungary. She competed in the women's 53 kg event at the 2022 World Wrestling Championships held in Belgrade, Serbia.
