= 2007 World Wrestling Championships – Men's Greco-Roman 120 kg =

Men's Greco-Roman 120 kg at the 2007 World Championships
- Venue: Heydar Aliyev Sports and Concert Complex
- Dates: 19 September 2007
- Competitors: 36 from 36 nations

Medalists
gold medal	Mijaín López	Cuba
silver medal	Khasan Baroev	Russia
bronze medal	Dremiel Byers	United States
bronze medal	Yury Patrikeyev	Armenia

The men's Greco-Roman 120 kilograms is a competition featured at the 2007 World Wrestling Championships, and was held at the Heydar Aliyev Sports and Concert Complex in Baku, Azerbaijan on 19 September 2007.

== Results ==
Legend

- F — Won by fall
- R — Retired

=== Finals ===
Semifinals			Final
Dremiel Byers (USA)	1	0
Khasan Baroev (RUS)	1	4	Khasan Baroev (RUS)	1	1
Mihály Deák-Bárdos (HUN)	1	0	Mijaín López (CUB)	1	1
Mijaín López (CUB)	1	4

=== Top half ===
==== Section 1 ====
Round of 64

Round of 32
Rocco Daniele Ficara (ITA)	1	1
Ari Taub (CAN)	1	1
Ilya Krasnov (ISR)	0	0
Panagiotis Papadopoulos (GRE)	4	4
İsmail Güzel (TUR)	6	1	4
Ivan Ivanov (BUL)	0	3	4
Dremiel Byers (USA)	3	6
Radomir Petković (SRB)	1	0

Round of 16
Rocco Daniele Ficara (ITA)	4	1	1
Panagiotis Papadopoulos (GRE)	2	2	3
Ivan Ivanov (BUL)	1	0	0
Dremiel Byers (USA)	1	3	3

Quarterfinals
Panagiotis Papadopoulos (GRE)	0	0
Dremiel Byers (USA)	7	5

==== Section 2 ====
Round of 64

Round of 32
Khasan Baroev (RUS)	2	3
David Vála (CZE)	0	0
Nico Schmidt (GER)	1	1
Jalmar Sjöberg (SWE)	1	1
Marek Mikulski (POL)	1	1	0
Yannick Szczepaniak (FRA)	1	1	3^{F}
Saleh Emara (EGY)	0^{R}
Murodjon Tuychiev (TJK)	1

Round of 16
Khasan Baroev (RUS)	5	2
Jalmar Sjöberg (SWE)	0	0
Yannick Szczepaniak (FRA)	4	2
Murodjon Tuychiev (TJK)	1	1

Quarterfinals
Khasan Baroev (RUS)	5	4
Yannick Szczepaniak (FRA)	1	1

=== Bottom half ===
==== Section 3 ====
Round of 64

Round of 32
Mihály Deák-Bárdos (HUN)	5	3
Nurbek Ibragimov (KGZ)	0	0
Eoghn Julian-Tivoli (AUS)	0	0
Miloš Dejanović (MNE)	7	6
Matti Hämäläinen (FIN)	1	1
Oleksandr Chernetskyi (UKR)	2	2
Devender Singh (IND)	0
Georgiy Tsurtsumia (KAZ)	6^{F}

Round of 16
Mihály Deák-Bárdos (HUN)	5	6
Miloš Dejanović (MNE)	0	0
Oleksandr Chernetskyi (UKR)	8	1	1
Georgiy Tsurtsumia (KAZ)	0	8	1

Quarterfinals
Mihály Deák-Bárdos (HUN)	2	7
Oleksandr Chernetskyi (UKR)	0	0

==== Section 4 ====
Round of 64
Revaz Chelidze (GEO)	1	0
Yury Patrikeyev (ARM)	4	4
Mindaugas Mizgaitis (LTU)	1	1
Hirokazu Shinjo (JPN)	1	1
Anton Botev (AZE)	0	3
Mijaín López (CUB)	7	9
Davyd Saldadze (UZB)	4^{F}
Kun Killin (FSM)	0

Round of 32
Jasim Breesam (IRQ)	0	0
Ioseb Chugoshvili (BLR)	6	8
Liu Deli (CHN)	1	1	1
Masoud Hashemzadeh (IRI)	1	2	1
Yury Patrikeyev (ARM)	2	2
Mindaugas Mizgaitis (LTU)	1	0
Mijaín López (CUB)	5	2
Davyd Saldadze (UZB)	0	0

Round of 16
Ioseb Chugoshvili (BLR)	2	2
Liu Deli (CHN)	1	1
Yury Patrikeyev (ARM)	4	0	1
Mijaín López (CUB)	0	7	1

Quarterfinals
Ioseb Chugoshvili (BLR)	0	0
Mijaín López (CUB)	6	7

=== Repechage ===
Repechage round 1
Anton Botev (AZE)	2	0	3
Davyd Saldadze (UZB)	1	3	2

Repechage round 2
David Vála (CZE)	1	1
Jalmar Sjöberg (SWE)	1	1
Anton Botev (AZE)	0	0
Yury Patrikeyev (ARM)	6	5

Repechage round 3
David Vála (CZE)	1	0
Yannick Szczepaniak (FRA)	1	2
Yury Patrikeyev (ARM)	2	4
Ioseb Chugoshvili (BLR)	1	0

Bronze medals
Yannick Szczepaniak (FRA)	1	0	1
Dremiel Byers (USA)	1	2	2
Yury Patrikeyev (ARM)	4^{F}
Mihály Deák-Bárdos (HUN)	0
