= 2005 World Wrestling Championships – Men's Greco-Roman 120 kg =

Men's Greco-Roman 120 kg at the 2005 World Championships
- Venue: László Papp Budapest Sports Arena
- Dates: 2 October 2005
- Competitors: 26 from 26 nations

Medalists
gold medal	Mijaín López	Cuba
silver medal	Mihály Deák-Bárdos	Hungary
bronze medal	Siarhei Artsiukhin	Belarus
bronze medal	Yekta Yılmaz Gül	Turkey

The men's Greco-Roman 120 kilograms is a competition featured at the 2005 World Wrestling Championships, and was held at the László Papp Budapest Sports Arena in Budapest, Hungary on 2 October 2005.

This Greco-Roman wrestling competition consists of a single-elimination tournament, with a repechage used to determine the winner of two bronze medals.

== Results ==
Legend

- C — Won by 3 cautions given to the opponent
- F — Won by fall

=== Final ===
Final
Mihály Deák-Bárdos (HUN)	0	1
Mijaín López (CUB)	6	1

=== Top half ===
Round of 32
Nico Schmidt (GER)	6	2	1^{C}
Liu Deli (CHN)	0	3	0
Marek Mikulski (POL)	0	0
Siarhei Artsiukhin (BLR)	4	3^{C}

Round of 16
Sergei Mureiko (BUL)	3	1	1^{C}
Vladimir Guralski (ISR)	0	2	1
Mindaugas Mizgaitis (LTU)	1	1
Mirian Giorgadze (GEO)	1	1
Mihály Deák-Bárdos (HUN)	7	6
Naoki Sawada (JPN)	0	0
Nico Schmidt (GER)	0	0
Siarhei Artsiukhin (BLR)	3	6

Quarterfinals
Sergei Mureiko (BUL)	1	0
Mindaugas Mizgaitis (LTU)	1	2
Mihály Deák-Bárdos (HUN)	1	5	1
Siarhei Artsiukhin (BLR)	1	0	1

Semifinals
Mindaugas Mizgaitis (LTU)	1	0	0
Mihály Deák-Bárdos (HUN)	1	4	1^{C}

=== Bottom half ===
Round of 32
Jalmar Sjöberg (SWE)	0	0
Yekta Yılmaz Gül (TUR)	2	5
Ari Taub (CAN)	0	0
Mijaín López (CUB)	8	8
Andrés Ayub (CHI)	0	0
Juha Ahokas (FIN)	7	3^{F}
Xenofon Koutsioumpas (GRE)	6	7
Narender Singh (IND)	0	0
Sergio Primera (VEN)	3	0
David Vála (CZE)	6	1^{C}
Aleksander Ekimov (RUS)	2	1
Konstantin Stryzhak (UKR)	3	1
Georgiy Tsurtsumia (KAZ)	5	1
Mehdi Sharabiani (IRI)	0	1
Dremiel Byers (USA)	4	2
Rocco Daniele Ficara (ITA)	1	0

Round of 16
Yekta Yılmaz Gül (TUR)	0	0
Mijaín López (CUB)	9	7
Juha Ahokas (FIN)	6	4
Xenofon Koutsioumpas (GRE)	0	2
David Vála (CZE)	3	2	1
Konstantin Stryzhak (UKR)	1	3	7
Georgiy Tsurtsumia (KAZ)	3	1
Dremiel Byers (USA)	0	1

Quarterfinals
Mijaín López (CUB)	6	6^{F}
Juha Ahokas (FIN)	0	0
Konstantin Stryzhak (UKR)	0	3	1
Georgiy Tsurtsumia (KAZ)	6	0	1

Semifinals
Mijaín López (CUB)	5	3
Georgiy Tsurtsumia (KAZ)	0	0

=== Repechage ===
Repechage round 1
Ari Taub (CAN)	0	0
Yekta Yılmaz Gül (TUR)	3	4

Repechage round 2
Naoki Sawada (JPN)	0	0
Siarhei Artsiukhin (BLR)	5	4
Yekta Yılmaz Gül (TUR)	1	3	1^{C}
Juha Ahokas (FIN)	1	0	0

Bronze medals
Siarhei Artsiukhin (BLR)	2	1	2^{C}
Mindaugas Mizgaitis (LTU)	0	3	0
Yekta Yılmaz Gül (TUR)	2	2
Georgiy Tsurtsumia (KAZ)	0	0
