= Mijaín López =

Cuban Greco-Roman wrestler (born 1982)

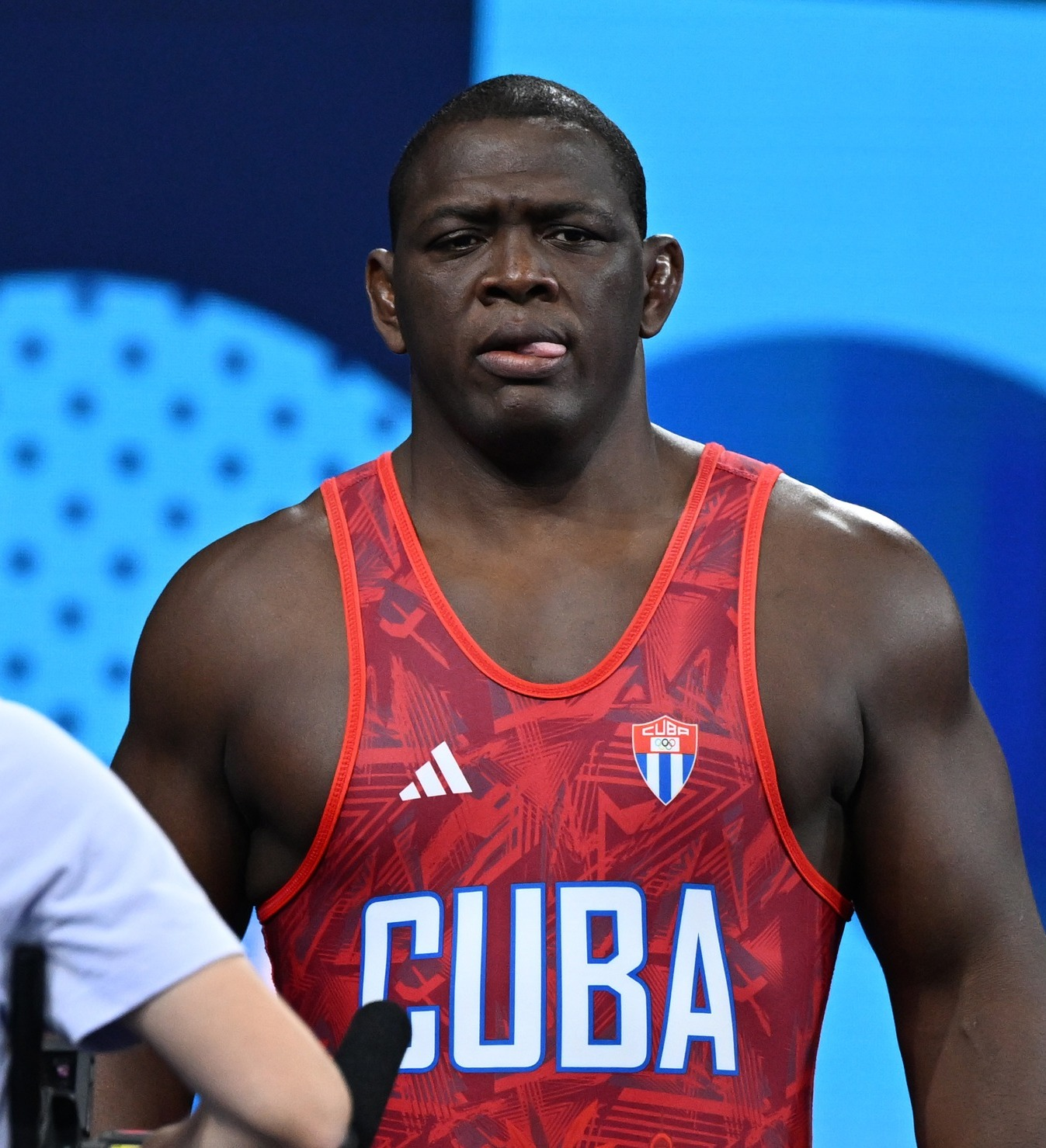
- López at the 2024 Summer Olympics

Personal information
- Full name: Mijaín López Núñez
- Nicknames: The Kid, El Terrible, The Giant of Herradura
- Born: 20 August 1982 (age 44) Entronque de Herradura, Cuba
- Height: 1.96 m (6 ft 5 in)
- Weight: 131.5 kg (290 lb)

Sport
- Country: Cuba
- Sport: Wrestling
- Event: Greco-Roman
- Club: Cerro Pelado
- Coached by: Pedro Val
Medal record
Men's wrestling
Representing Cuba
Event	1st	2nd	3rd
Olympic Games	5	0	0
World Championship	5	3	0
World Cup	3	0	0
World University Championship	1	0	0
Pan American Games	5	0	0
Central American and Caribbean Games	3	0	0
Pan American Championship	9	1	0
Grand Prix Ivan Poddubny	0	0	1
Junior Pan American Wrestling Championship	2	0	0
Total	33	4	1
Men's Greco-Roman wrestling
Olympic Games
Gold medal – first place	2008 Beijing	120 kg
Gold medal – first place	2012 London	120 kg
Gold medal – first place	2016 Rio de Janeiro	130 kg
Gold medal – first place	2020 Tokyo	130 kg
Gold medal – first place	2024 Paris	130 kg
World Championships
Gold medal – first place	2005 Budapest	120 kg
Gold medal – first place	2007 Baku	120 kg
Gold medal – first place	2009 Herning	120 kg
Gold medal – first place	2010 Moscow	120 kg
Gold medal – first place	2014 Tashkent	130 kg
Silver medal – second place	2006 Guangzhou	120 kg
Silver medal – second place	2011 Istanbul	120 kg
Silver medal – second place	2015 Las Vegas	130 kg
World Cup
Gold medal – first place	2005 Tehran	120 kg
Gold medal – first place	2006 Budapest	120 kg
Gold medal – first place	2009 Clermont-Ferrand	120 kg
World University Championships
Gold medal – first place	2005 Izmir	120 kg
Pan American Games
Gold medal – first place	2003 Santo Domingo	120 kg
Gold medal – first place	2007 Rio de Janeiro	120 kg
Gold medal – first place	2011 Guadalajara	120 kg
Gold medal – first place	2015 Toronto	130 kg
Gold medal – first place	2019 Lima	130 kg
Central American and Caribbean Games
Gold medal – first place	2014 San Juan	130 kg
Gold medal – first place	2014 Veracruz	130 kg
Gold medal – first place	2018 Barranquilla	130 kg
Pan American Championships
Gold medal – first place	2002 Maracaibo	120 kg
Gold medal – first place	2004 Guatemala City	120 kg
Gold medal – first place	2005 Guatemala City	120 kg
Gold medal – first place	2006 Rio de Janeiro	120 kg
Gold medal – first place	2007 San Salvador	120 kg
Gold medal – first place	2008 Colorado Springs	120 kg
Gold medal – first place	2009 Maracaibo	120 kg
Gold medal – first place	2012 Colorado Springs	120 kg
Gold medal – first place	2014 Mexico City	130 kg
Silver medal – second place	2003 Guatemala City	120 kg
Junior Pan American Championships
Gold medal – first place	2002 Bogota	120 kg
Men's freestyle wrestling
Junior Pan American Championships
Gold medal – first place	2002 Bogota	120 kg

Mijaín López Núñez (Note: In this name that follows Hispanic American naming customs, the first or paternal surname is López and the second or maternal family name is Núñez.) (born 20 August 1982) is a Cuban retired Greco-Roman wrestler. Widely considered one of the greatest wrestlers of all time, López is a five-time Olympic gold medalist, five-time World Champion, for a total of 10 world gold medals (second highest, behind Aleksandr Karelin's twelve), and a five-time Pan American Games champion. He is the younger brother of Michel López Núñez, a Cuban amateur boxer. López was Cuba's flag bearer at the opening ceremony of the 2008, 2012, 2016 and 2020 Summer Olympics, and one of the country's flag bearers at the closing ceremony of the 2024 Summer Olympics.

Upon winning the gold medal in the Greco-Roman 130 kg event at the 2024 Paris Olympics, López became the first and only athlete in modern Olympics history to win five consecutive gold medals in the same individual event.

== Career ==
López has represented Cuba at the 2004, 2008, and 2012 Summer Olympics in Athens, Beijing, and London, and was his country's flag bearer during the opening ceremonies in 2008 and 2012. In 2004, he placed fifth, whereas in 2008 and 2012, he won the gold medal in the men's Greco-Roman 120 kg category. At the 2016 Rio Games, López won Gold in the 130 kg category. He again won gold at the 2020 Tokyo Games without losing a single point in the tournament, becoming the first male wrestler to win four Olympic gold medals, as well as only the fifth athlete to win four gold medals in the same individual event. During the opening ceremony of the same Olympics, he also became the first Cuban representative to become the country's flag bearer four times, breaking the tie between Teófilo Stevenson and himself.

Lopez only had one negative international head-to-head record, that being against his Russian rival Khasan Baroev, who beat him at the 2004 Olympics, 2006 World Championships, and 2008 Grand Prix Ivan Poddubny, while López beat Baroev at the 2007 World Championships and 2008 Olympics, ending the head-to-head 3 to 2 in favor of Baroev. In all, López suffered nine international losses, thrice to Baroev, twice to Rıza Kayaalp, and then once to Dremiel Byers, Yury Patrikeyev, Juha Ahokas, and Xenofon Koutsioumpas.

In 2016, López won his tenth gold medal at the national wrestling championships of Cuba.

At the 2024 Summer Olympics in Paris, López won his fifth gold medal, becoming the first Olympic athlete in any sport to win five gold medals in the same individual event. He subsequently left his wrestling shoes in the center of the mat after his victory, signifying his retirement from the sport.

== International competition record ==
=== Continental Championships ===
López won the Pan American Championships nine times, in 2002, 2004, 2005, 2006, 2007, 2008, 2009, 2012 and 2014. He won silver at the 2003 edition, losing to Dremiel Byers in the final.

=== World Championships ===
- In his first senior world championships, the 2001 World Championships, López placed 6th at 130 kg, losing to Xenofon Koutsioumpas in the quarterfinals 1–6.
- In the 2002 World Championships, he placed 13th at 120 kg, losing in the preliminaries to Yury Patrikeyev 0–4 but recorded a win against Sergei Mureiko.
- In the 2003 World Championships, he placed 16th at 120 kg, with a win against Mirian Giorgadze and a loss against Juha Ahokas in the group stage.
- In the 2005 World Championships he won the gold medal in the 120 kg weight class, outscoring his opponents 52–0 up to the final, before winning the final 7-1 vs Mihály Deák-Bárdos (HUN), in Budapest (Hungary).
- In the 2006 World Wrestling Championships he won the silver medal in the 120 kg weight class, outscoring his opponents 40–0 up to the final, before losing the final 0-12 vs Khasan Baroev (RUS), in Guangzhou (China).
- In the 2007 World Wrestling Championships he won the gold medal in the 120 kg weight class, outscoring his opponents 49–9 up to the final, before winning the final 2-2 vs Khasan Baroev (RUS), in Baku (Azerbaijan).
- In the 2009 World Wrestling Championships he won the gold medal in the 120 kg weight class, outscoring his opponents 25–0 up to the final, before winning the final 6-1 vs Dremiel Byers (USA), in Herning (Denmark).
- In the 2010 World Wrestling Championships he won the gold medal in the 120 kg weight class, outscoring his opponents 21–0 up to the final, before winning the final 4-0 vs Yury Patrikeyev (ARM), in Moscow (Russia).
- In the 2011 World Wrestling Championships he won the silver medal in the 120 kg weight class, outscoring his opponents 16–0 up to the final, before losing the final 0-4 vs Rıza Kayaalp (TUR), in Istanbul (Turkey).
- In the 2014 World Wrestling Championships he won the gold medal in the 130 kg weight class, outscoring his opponents 25–2 up to the final, before winning the final 2-0 vs Rıza Kayaalp (TUR), in Tashkent (Uzbekistan).
- In the 2015 World Wrestling Championships he won the silver medal in the 130 kg weight class, outscoring his opponents 15–1 up to the final, before losing the final 0-4 vs Rıza Kayaalp (TUR), in Las Vegas (United States).

=== Olympic Games ===
- In the 2004 Olympics he placed fifth in the 120 kg weight class in Athens, losing to his rival Khasan Baroev 0–2 in the knockout stage.
- In the 2008 Olympics he won the gold medal, outscoring his opponents 24–3 in the 120 kg weight class in Beijing.
- In the 2012 Olympics he won the gold medal, outscoring his opponents 14–0 in the 120 kg weight class in London.
- In the 2016 Olympics he won the gold medal, outscoring his opponents 16–0 in the 130 kg weight class in Rio de Janeiro.
- In the 2020 Olympics he won the gold medal, outscoring his opponents 24–0 in the 130 kg weight class in Tokyo.
- In the 2024 Olympics he won the gold medal, outscoring his opponents 20–2 in the 130 kg weight class in Paris.

International competition record
Res.	Opponent	Record	Score	Date	Event	Location	Venue
2004 Athens 5th place at 120 kg
Won	(Israel) Yuri Evseichik	1-0	5-0	24 August 2004	2004 Summer Olympics	Athens, Greece	Ano Liosia Olympic Hall (now SUNEL Arena)
Won	(Turkey) Yekta Yılmaz Gül	2-0	4-0	24 August 2004	2004 Summer Olympics	Athens, Greece	Ano Liosia Olympic Hall (now SUNEL Arena)
Lost	(Russia) Khasan Baroev	2-1	0-2	25 August 2004	2004 Summer Olympics	Athens, Greece	Ano Liosia Olympic Hall (now SUNEL Arena)
Won	(France) Yannick Szczepaniak	3-1	WO	25 August 2004	2004 Summer Olympics	Athens, Greece	Ano Liosia Olympic Hall (now SUNEL Arena)
2005 World Championships (gold) at Men's Greco-Roman 120kg
Won	(Canada) Ari Taub	4-1	16-0	2 October 2005	2005 World Wrestling Championships	Budapest, Hungary	László Papp Budapest Sports Arena
Won	(Turkey) Yekta Yılmaz Gül	5-1	16-0	2 October 2005	2005 World Wrestling Championships	Budapest, Hungary	László Papp Budapest Sports Arena
Won	(Finland) Juha Ahokas	6-1	12-0	2 October 2005	2005 World Wrestling Championships	Budapest, Hungary	László Papp Budapest Sports Arena
Won	(Kazakhstan) Georgiy Tsurtsumia	7-1	8-0	2 October 2005	2005 World Wrestling Championships	Budapest, Hungary	László Papp Budapest Sports Arena
Won	(Hungary) Mihály Deák-Bárdos	8-1	7-1	2 October 2005	2005 World Wrestling Championships	Budapest, Hungary	László Papp Budapest Sports Arena
2006 World Championships (silver) at Men's Greco-Roman 120kg
Won	(China) Liu Hao	9-1	11-0	27 September 2006	2006 World Wrestling Championships	Guangzhou, China	Tianhe Gymnasium
Won	(Lithuania) Mindaugas Mizgaitis	10-1	13-0	27 September 2006	2006 World Wrestling Championships	Guangzhou, China	Tianhe Gymnasium
Won	(Turkey) İsmail Güzel	11-1	7-0	27 September 2006	2006 World Wrestling Championships	Guangzhou, China	Tianhe Gymnasium
Won	(Hungary) Mihály Deák-Bárdos	12-1	9-0	27 September 2006	2006 World Wrestling Championships	Guangzhou, China	Tianhe Gymnasium
Lost	(Russia) Khasan Baroev	12-2	0-12	27 September 2006	2006 World Wrestling Championships	Guangzhou, China	Tianhe Gymnasium
2007 World Championships (gold) at Men's Greco-Roman 120kg
Won	(Azerbaijan) Anton Botev	13-2	16-3	19 September 2007	2007 World Wrestling Championships	Baku, Azerbaijan	Heydar Aliyev Sports and Concert Complex
Won	(Uzbekistan) Davyd Saldadze	14-2	7-0	19 September 2007	2007 World Wrestling Championships	Baku, Azerbaijan	Heydar Aliyev Sports and Concert Complex
Won	(Armenia) Yuri Patrikeyev	15-2	8-5	19 September 2007	2007 World Wrestling Championships	Baku, Azerbaijan	Heydar Aliyev Sports and Concert Complex
Won	(Belarus) Ioseb Chugoshvili	16-2	13-0	19 September 2007	2007 World Wrestling Championships	Baku, Azerbaijan	Heydar Aliyev Sports and Concert Complex
Won	(Russia) Khasan Baroev	17-2	2-2	19 September 2007	2007 World Wrestling Championships	Baku, Azerbaijan	Heydar Aliyev Sports and Concert Complex
2008 Beijing (gold) at 120 kg
Won	(Belarus) Siarhei Artsiukhin	18-2	5-1	14 August 2008	2008 Summer Olympics	Beijing, China	China Agricultural University Gymnasium
Won	(Armenia) Yuri Patrikeyev	19-2	4F-1	14 August 2008	2008 Summer Olympics	Beijing, China	China Agricultural University Gymnasium
Won	(Sweden) Jalmar Sjöberg	20-2	9-0	14 August 2008	2008 Summer Olympics	Beijing, China	China Agricultural University Gymnasium
Won	(Russia) Khasan Baroev	21-2	6-1	14 August 2008	2008 Summer Olympics	Beijing, China	China Agricultural University Gymnasium
2009 World Championships (gold) at Men's Greco-Roman 120kg
Won	(Iraq) Ali Nadhim	22-2	7-0	27 September 2009	2009 World Wrestling Championships	Herning, Denmark	Messecenter Herning
Won	(Venezuela) Rafael Barreno	23-2	12-0	27 September 2009	2009 World Wrestling Championships	Herning, Denmark	Messecenter Herning
Won	(Belarus) Ioseb Chugoshvili	24-2	4-5	27 September 2009	2009 World Wrestling Championships	Herning, Denmark	Messecenter Herning
Won	(Turkey) Rıza Kayaalp	25-2	2-0	27 September 2009	2009 World Wrestling Championships	Herning, Denmark	Messecenter Herning
Won	(United States) Dremiel Byers	26-2	6F-1	27 September 2009	2009 World Wrestling Championships	Herning, Denmark	Messecenter Herning
2010 World Championships (gold) at Men's Greco-Roman 120kg
Won	(China) Nie Xiaoming	27-2	8-0	7 September 2010	2010 World Wrestling Championships	Moscow, Russia	Olympic Stadium
Won	(Poland) Łukasz Banak	28-2	4-0	7 September 2010	2010 World Wrestling Championships	Moscow, Russia	Olympic Stadium
Won	(Czech Republic) Marek Švec	29-2	7-0	7 September 2010	2010 World Wrestling Championships	Moscow, Russia	Olympic Stadium
Won	(Kazakhstan) Nurmakhan Tinaliyev	30-2	2-0	7 September 2010	2010 World Wrestling Championships	Moscow, Russia	Olympic Stadium
Won	(Armenia) Yuri Patrikeyev	31-2	4-0	7 September 2010	2010 World Wrestling Championships	Moscow, Russia	Olympic Stadium
2011 World Championships (silver) at Men's Greco-Roman 120kg
Won	(Sweden) Johan Eurén	32-2	3-0	13 September 2011	2011 World Wrestling Championships	Istanbul, Turkey	Sinan Erdem Dome
Won	(Kyrgyzstan) Murat Ramonov	33-2	6-0	13 September 2011	2011 World Wrestling Championships	Istanbul, Turkey	Sinan Erdem Dome
Won	(Armenia) Yuri Patrikeyev	34-2	3-0	13 September 2011	2011 World Wrestling Championships	Istanbul, Turkey	Sinan Erdem Dome
Won	(Iran) Bashir Babajanzadeh	35-2	2-0	13 September 2011	2011 World Wrestling Championships	Istanbul, Turkey	Sinan Erdem Dome
Won	(Poland) Łukasz Banak	36-2	2-0	13 September 2011	2011 World Wrestling Championships	Istanbul, Turkey	Sinan Erdem Dome
Lost	(Turkey) Rıza Kayaalp	36-3	0-4	13 September 2011	2011 World Wrestling Championships	Istanbul, Turkey	Sinan Erdem Dome
2012 London (gold) at 120 kg
Won	(Egypt) Abdelrahman El-Trabely	37-3	4-0	6 August 2012	2012 Summer Olympics	London, United Kingdom	ExCeL London
Won	(Georgia (country)) Guram Pherselidze	38-3	4-0	6 August 2012	2012 Summer Olympics	London, United Kingdom	ExCeL London
Won	(Turkey) Rıza Kayaalp	39-3	3-0	6 August 2012	2012 Summer Olympics	London, United Kingdom	ExCeL London
Won	(Estonia) Heiki Nabi	40-3	3-1	6 August 2012	2012 Summer Olympics	London, United Kingdom	ExCeL London
2014 World Championships (gold) at Men's Greco-Roman 130kg
Won	(Tajikistan) Murodjon Tuychiev	41-3	10-2	13 September 2014	2014 World Wrestling Championships	Tashkent, Uzbekistan	Gymnastics Sport Palace
Won	(Germany) Eduard Popp	42-3	8-0	13 September 2014	2014 World Wrestling Championships	Tashkent, Uzbekistan	Gymnastics Sport Palace
Won	(Iran) Behnam Mehdizadeh	43-3	6c-0	13 September 2014	2014 World Wrestling Championships	Tashkent, Uzbekistan	Gymnastics Sport Palace
Won	(Russia) Bilyal Makhov	44-3	1-0	13 September 2014	2014 World Wrestling Championships	Tashkent, Uzbekistan	Gymnastics Sport Palace
Won	(Turkey) Rıza Kayaalp	45-3	2-0	13 September 2014	2014 World Wrestling Championships	Tashkent, Uzbekistan	Gymnastics Sport Palace
2015 World Championships (silver) at Men's Greco-Roman 130kg
Won	(Russia) Bilyal Makhov	46-3	2-1	8 September 2015	2015 World Wrestling Championships	(United States) Las Vegas	Orleans Arena
Won	(Lithuania) Mindaugas Mizgaitis	47-3	3-0	8 September 2015	2015 World Wrestling Championships	(United States) Las Vegas	Orleans Arena
Won	(Estonia) Heiki Nabi	48-3	2-0	8 September 2015	2015 World Wrestling Championships	(United States) Las Vegas	Orleans Arena
Won	(United States) Robby Smith	49-3	8-0	8 September 2015	2015 World Wrestling Championships	(United States) Las Vegas	Orleans Arena
Lost	(Turkey) Rıza Kayaalp	49-4	0-1	8 September 2015	2015 World Wrestling Championships	(United States) Las Vegas	Orleans Arena
2016 Rio de Janeiro (gold) at 130 kg
Won	(Estonia) Heiki Nabi	50-4	3-0	15 August 2016	2016 Summer Olympics	Rio de Janeiro, Brazil	Carioca Arena 2
Won	(Sweden) Johan Eurén	51-4	4-0	15 August 2016	2016 Summer Olympics	Rio de Janeiro, Brazil	Carioca Arena 2
Won	(Russia) Sergey Semenov	52-4	3-0	15 August 2016	2016 Summer Olympics	Rio de Janeiro, Brazil	Carioca Arena 2
Won	(Turkey) Rıza Kayaalp	53-4	6-0	15 August 2016	2016 Summer Olympics	Rio de Janeiro, Brazil	Carioca Arena 2
2021 Tokyo (gold) at 130 kg
Won	(Romania) Alin Alexuc-Ciurariu	54-4	9-0	1 August 2021	2020 Summer Olympics	Tokyo, Japan	Makuhari Messe
Won	(Iran) Amin Mirzazadeh	55-4	8-0	1 August 2021	2020 Summer Olympics	Tokyo, Japan	Makuhari Messe
Won	(Turkey) Rıza Kayaalp	56-4	2-0	1 August 2021	2020 Summer Olympics	Tokyo, Japan	Makuhari Messe
Won	(Georgia (country)) Iakobi Kajaia	57-4	5-0	2 August 2021	2020 Summer Olympics	Tokyo, Japan	Makuhari Messe
2024 Paris (gold) at 130 kg
Won	(South Korea) Lee Seung-chan	58-4	7-0	5 August 2024	2024 Summer Olympics	Paris, France	Grand Palais Éphémère
Won	(Iran) Amin Mirzazadeh	59-4	3-1	5 August 2024	2024 Summer Olympics	Paris, France	Grand Palais Éphémère
Won	(Azerbaijan) Sabah Shariati	60-4	4-1	5 August 2024	2024 Summer Olympics	Paris, France	Grand Palais Éphémère
Won	(Chile) Yasmani Acosta	61-4	6-0	6 August 2024	2024 Summer Olympics	Paris, France	Grand Palais Éphémère

== See also ==
- List of multiple Olympic gold medalists in one event

== Notes ==
Olympic Games
Preceded by Iván Pedroso	Flagbearer for Cuba; Beijing 2008; London 2012; Rio de Janeiro 2016; Tokyo 2020 with Yaime Perez	Succeeded by Julio César La Cruz; Idalys Ortiz
