= 2006 World Wrestling Championships – Men's Greco-Roman 120 kg =

Men's Greco-Roman 120 kg at the 2006 World Championships
- Venue: Tianhe Gymnasium
- Dates: 27 September 2006
- Competitors: 21 from 21 nations

Medalists
gold medal	Khasan Baroev	Russia
silver medal	Mijaín López	Cuba
bronze medal	Siarhei Artsiukhin	Belarus
bronze medal	İsmail Güzel	Turkey

The men's Greco-Roman 120 kilograms is a competition featured at the 2006 World Wrestling Championships, and was held at the Tianhe Gymnasium in Guangzhou, China on 27 September 2006.

This Greco-Roman wrestling competition consists of a single-elimination tournament, with a repechage used to determine the winner of two bronze medals.

== Results ==
Legend

- F — Won by fall

=== Final ===
Final
Khasan Baroev (RUS)	6	6
Mijaín López (CUB)	0	0

=== Top half ===
Round of 32

Round of 16
Ralf Böhringer (GER)	0	0
Jalmar Sjöberg (SWE)	3	2
Ari Taub (CAN)	0	0
David Vála (CZE)	4	5
Siarhei Artsiukhin (BLR)	4	4
Katsuaki Suzuki (JPN)	0	0
Xenofon Koutsioumpas (GRE)	0	1
Khasan Baroev (RUS)	4	2

Quarterfinals
Jalmar Sjöberg (SWE)	1	1	1
David Vála (CZE)	2	1	1
Siarhei Artsiukhin (BLR)	0	0
Khasan Baroev (RUS)	3	3

Semifinals
Jalmar Sjöberg (SWE)	0
Khasan Baroev (RUS)	7^{F}

=== Bottom half ===
Round of 32
Oleksandr Chernetskyi (UKR)	0	0
Mihály Deák-Bárdos (HUN)	4	3
Dremiel Byers (USA)	4	3
Vladimir Guralski (ISR)	0	0
Revaz Chelidze (GEO)	0	5	2
İsmail Güzel (TUR)	3	0	2
Mindaugas Mizgaitis (LTU)	0	3	4
Rocco Daniele Ficara (ITA)	4	0	0
Liu Hao (CHN)	0	0
Mijaín López (CUB)	6	5

Round of 16
Georgiy Tsurtsumia (KAZ)	0	1
Masoud Hashemzadeh (IRI)	7	1
Kim Gwang-seok (KOR)	0	1
Mihály Deák-Bárdos (HUN)	8	1
Dremiel Byers (USA)	3	1	1
İsmail Güzel (TUR)	0	2	1
Mindaugas Mizgaitis (LTU)	0	0
Mijaín López (CUB)	10	3

Quarterfinals
Masoud Hashemzadeh (IRI)	0	1
Mihály Deák-Bárdos (HUN)	4	1
İsmail Güzel (TUR)	0	0
Mijaín López (CUB)	4	3

Semifinals
Mihály Deák-Bárdos (HUN)	0	0
Mijaín López (CUB)	5	4

=== Repechage ===
Repechage round 1
Liu Hao (CHN)	4	0	3
Mindaugas Mizgaitis (LTU)	0	2	1

Repechage round 2
Xenofon Koutsioumpas (GRE)	1	0
Siarhei Artsiukhin (BLR)	2	3
Liu Hao (CHN)	0
İsmail Güzel (TUR)	7^{F}

Bronze medals
Siarhei Artsiukhin (BLR)	6	2
Jalmar Sjöberg (SWE)	0	1
İsmail Güzel (TUR)	3	1
Mihály Deák-Bárdos (HUN)	0	1
