= Armenia at the 2008 Summer Olympics =

- IOC code: ARM
- NOC: National Olympic Committee of Armenia
- Website: www.armnoc.am (in Armenian)

in Beijing
- Competitors: 25 in 7 sports
- Flag bearers: Albert Azaryan (opening); Harutyun Yenokyan (closing)
- Medals Ranked 62nd: Gold 0 Silver 1 Bronze 4 Total 5

Summer Olympics appearances (overview)
- 1996; 2000; 2004; 2008; 2012; 2016; 2020; 2024; 2028

Other related appearances
- Russian Empire (1900–1912); Soviet Union (1952–1988); Unified Team (1992)

Armenia competed in the 2008 Summer Olympics in Beijing, China. A team of 25 athletes, consisting of 9 wrestlers, 6 weightlifters, 4 boxers, 2 athletes, 2 judokas, 1 sport shooter and 1 swimmer was selected. With a total of six bronze medals, Armenia won more medals than in all previous Olympic Games combined.

== Medalists ==
Medal	Name	Sport	Event
Silver	Tigran Vardan Martirosyan	Weightlifting	Men's 85 kg
Bronze	Roman Amoyan	Wrestling	Men's Greco-Roman 55 kg
Bronze	Gevorg Davtyan	Weightlifting	Men's 77 kg
Bronze	Yury Patrikeyev	Wrestling	Men's Greco-Roman 120 kg
Bronze	Hrachik Javakhyan	Boxing	Lightweight

== Athletics ==
Key

- Note–Ranks given for track events are within the athlete's heat only
- Q = Qualified for the next round
- q = Qualified for the next round as a fastest loser or, in field events, by position without achieving the qualifying target
- NR = National record
- N/A = Round not applicable for the event
- Bye = Athlete not required to compete in round

Men

Athlete	Event	Qualification		Final	
Athlete	Event	Distance	Position	Distance	Position
Melik Janoyan	Javelin throw	64.47	37	Did not advance	

Women

Athlete	Event	Heat		Quarterfinal		Semifinal		Final	
Athlete	Event	Result	Rank	Result	Rank	Result	Rank	Result	Rank
Ani Khachikyan	100 m	12.76	6	Did not advance					

== Boxing ==
Armenia had four boxers qualify for the Olympics. Javakhyan and Hambardzumyan qualified in their weight classes at the World Boxing Championships. Hakobyan qualified in the middleweight at the first European qualifying tournament.

Athlete	Event	Round of 32	Round of 16	Quarterfinals	Semifinals	Final	
Athlete	Event	Opposition Result	Opposition Result	Opposition Result	Opposition Result	Opposition Result	Rank
Hovhannes Danielyan	Light flyweight	Essomba (CMR); W 9–3	Zhakypov (KAZ); L 7–13	Did not advance			
Hrachik Javakhyan	Lightweight	Bye	Lawal (NGR); W 12–0	Baik J-S (KOR); W WO	Tishchenko (RUS); L 5–10	Did not advance	3rd place, bronze medalist(s)
Eduard Hambardzumyan	Light welterweight	Díaz (DOM); L 4–11	Did not advance				
Andranik Hakobyan	Middleweight	Saraku (GHA); W 14–8	Rasulov (UZB); L 3–7	Did not advance			

== Judo ==
Athlete	Event	Preliminary	Round of 32	Round of 16	Quarterfinals	Semifinals	Repechage 1	Repechage 2	Repechage 3	Final / BM	
Athlete	Event	Opposition Result	Opposition Result	Opposition Result	Opposition Result	Opposition Result	Opposition Result	Opposition Result	Opposition Result	Opposition Result	Rank
Hovhannes Davtyan	Men's −60 kg	Bye	Piker (CUB); W 0100–0010	Kim K-J (PRK); L 0000–0022	Did not advance						
Armen Nazaryan	Men's −66 kg	Bye	El Hady (EGY); L 0000–0001	Did not advance							

== Shooting ==
Men

Athlete	Event	Qualification		Final	
Athlete	Event	Points	Rank	Points	Rank
Norayr Bakhtamyan	10 m air pistol	580	12	Did not advance	
Norayr Bakhtamyan	50 m pistol	555	15	Did not advance	

== Swimming ==
Men

Athlete	Event	Heat		Semifinal		Final	
Athlete	Event	Time	Rank	Time	Rank	Time	Rank
Mikael Koloyan	100 m freestyle	51.89	56	Did not advance			

== Weightlifting ==
Men

Athlete	Event	Snatch		Clean & Jerk		Total	Rank
Athlete	Event	Result	Rank	Result	Rank	Total	Rank
Tigran Gevorg Martirosyan	−69 kg	153	3	185	3	338	DSQ
Gevorg Davtyan	−77 kg	165	2	195	5	360	3rd place, bronze medalist(s)
Ara Khachatryan	−77 kg	162	4	191	10	353	7
Edgar Gevorgyan	−85 kg	176	5	~~196~~	DNF	176	DNF
Tigran Vardan Martirosyan	−85 kg	177	4	203	3	380	2nd place, silver medalist(s)

Women

Athlete	Event	Snatch		Clean & Jerk		Total	Rank
Athlete	Event	Result	Rank	Result	Rank	Total	Rank
Hripsime Khurshudyan	−75 kg	105	7	130	10	235	11

== Wrestling ==
Key:

- VT - Victory by Fall.
- PP - Decision by Points - the loser with technical points.
- PO - Decision by Points - the loser without technical points.

Men's freestyle

Athlete	Event	Qualification	Round of 16	Quarterfinal	Semifinal	Repechage 1	Repechage 2	Final / BM	
Athlete	Event	Opposition Result	Opposition Result	Opposition Result	Opposition Result	Opposition Result	Opposition Result	Opposition Result	Rank
Martin Berberyan	−60 kg	Azarbayjani (CAN); L 0–3 ^{PO}	Did not advance						17
Suren Markosyan	−66 kg	Farniev (RUS); L 1–3 ^{PP}	Did not advance						18
Harutyun Yenokyan	−84 kg	Bye	Rhimi (TUN); W 3–1 ^{PP}	Mindorashvili (GEO); L 0–3 ^{PO}	Did not advance	Bye	Bichinashvili (GER); L 1–3 ^{PP}	Did not advance	8

Men's Greco-Roman

Athlete	Event	Qualification	Round of 16	Quarterfinal	Semifinal	Repechage 1	Repechage 2	Final / BM	
Athlete	Event	Opposition Result	Opposition Result	Opposition Result	Opposition Result	Opposition Result	Opposition Result	Opposition Result	Rank
Roman Amoyan	−55 kg	Bye	Imanbayev (KAZ); W 3–1 ^{PP}	Gogitadze (GEO); W 3–1 ^{PP}	Bayramov (AZE); L 1–3 ^{PP}	Bye		Hernández (CUB); W 3–1 ^{PP}	3rd place, bronze medalist(s)
Karen Mnatsakanyan	−60 kg	Sasamoto (JPN); L 1–3 ^{PP}	Did not advance						17
Arman Adikyan	−66 kg	Lőrincz (HUN); L 1–3 ^{PP}	Did not advance						14
Arsen Julfalakyan	−74 kg	Shatskykh (UKR); W 3–1 ^{PP}	Bácsi (HUN); L 1–3 ^{PP}	Did not advance					10
Denis Forov	−84 kg	Matsumoto (JPN); W 3–1 ^{PP}	Vering (USA); W 3–1 ^{PP}	Abrahamian (SWE); L 1–3 ^{PP}	Did not advance				7
Yury Patrikeyev	−120 kg	Bye	Sakr (EGY); W 3–1 ^{PP}	López (CUB); L 1–3 ^{PP}	Did not advance	Bye	Artsiukhin (BLR); W 3–1 ^{PP}	Sjöberg (SWE); W 3–1 ^{PP}	3rd place, bronze medalist(s)
