= Artyukhin =

Artyukhin (Russian: Артюхин) is a Russian masculine surname, its feminine counterpart is Artyukhina. It may refer to

- Aleksandra Artyukhina (1889–1969), Russian revolutionary
- Evgeny Artyukhin (born 1983), Russian hockey player
- Evgeny Artyukhin Sr. (1949–2008), Soviet Greco-Roman wrestler
- Sergei Artyukhin (1976–2012), Russian-Belarusian Greco-Roman wrestler, brother of Evgeny and son of Evgeny Sr.
- Yuri Artyukhin, (1930–1998) Russian cosmonaut
