= Wrestling at the 2008 Summer Olympics – Men's Greco-Roman 120 kg =

Men's Greco-Roman 120 kg at the Games of the XXIX Olympiad
- Venue: China Agricultural University Gymnasium
- Date: 14 August 2008
- Competitors: 20 from 20 nations

Medalists
1st place, gold medalist(s)		Mijaín López	Cuba
2nd place, silver medalist(s)		Mindaugas Mizgaitis	Lithuania
3rd place, bronze medalist(s)		Yannick Szczepaniak	France
3rd place, bronze medalist(s)		Yury Patrikeyev	Armenia

Men's Greco-Roman 120 kilograms competition at the 2008 Summer Olympics in Beijing, China, was held on August 14 at the China Agricultural University Gymnasium.

This Greco-Roman wrestling competition consists of a single-elimination tournament, with a repechage used to determine the winner of two bronze medals. The two finalists face off for gold and silver medals. Each wrestler who loses to one of the two finalists moves into the repechage, culminating in a pair of bronze medal matches featuring the semifinal losers each facing the remaining repechage opponent from their half of the bracket.

Each bout consists of up to three rounds, lasting two minutes apiece. The wrestler who scores more points in each round is the winner of that rounds; the bout ends when one wrestler has won two rounds (and thus the match).

== Schedule ==
All times are China Standard Time (UTC+08:00)

Date	Time	Event
14 August 2008	09:30	Qualification rounds
14 August 2008	16:00	Repechage
14 August 2008	17:00	Finals

== Results ==
Legend

- F — Won by fall

=== Final ===
Final
Khasan Baroev (RUS)	0	1
Mijaín López (CUB)	5	1

=== Top half ===
Qualifications

1/8 finals
Mihály Deák-Bárdos (HUN)	2	4
Ari Taub (CAN)	1	1
Yannick Szczepaniak (FRA)	1	1	1
Ivan Ivanov (BUL)	1	1	1
Khasan Baroev (RUS)	3	6
Masoud Hashemzadeh (IRI)	0	0
Rıza Kayaalp (TUR)	1	1
Mindaugas Mizgaitis (LTU)	1	3^{F}

Quarterfinals
Mihály Deák-Bárdos (HUN)	1	2	1
Yannick Szczepaniak (FRA)	1	0	1
Khasan Baroev (RUS)	2	3
Mindaugas Mizgaitis (LTU)	1	0

Semifinals
Yannick Szczepaniak (FRA)	1	1
Khasan Baroev (RUS)	2	1

=== Bottom half ===
Qualifications
Jalmar Sjöberg (SWE)	0	5	3
Marek Mikulski (POL)	4	0	0
Davyd Saldadze (UZB)	1	2	0
Anton Botev (AZE)	2	1	2
Oleksandr Chernetskyi (UKR)	1	0
Dremiel Byers (USA)	1	2
Panagiotis Papadopoulos (GRE)	0	1
Liu Deli (CHN)	3	1

1/8 finals
Yasser Sakr (EGY)	1	0
Yury Patrikeyev (ARM)	5	7
Siarhei Artsiukhin (BLR)	0	1
Mijaín López (CUB)	3	2
Jalmar Sjöberg (SWE)	2	3
Anton Botev (AZE)	0	0
Dremiel Byers (USA)	4	1	1
Liu Deli (CHN)	0	1	1

Quarterfinals
Yury Patrikeyev (ARM)	1	0
Mijaín López (CUB)	1	3^{F}
Jalmar Sjöberg (SWE)	0	1	1
Dremiel Byers (USA)	3	1	1

Semifinals
Mijaín López (CUB)	4	5
Jalmar Sjöberg (SWE)	0	0

=== Repechage ===
Repechage round 2
Masoud Hashemzadeh (IRI)	1	1	1
Mindaugas Mizgaitis (LTU)	1	1	2
Siarhei Artsiukhin (BLR)	0	1
Yury Patrikeyev (ARM)	2	1

Bronze medal bout
Mindaugas Mizgaitis (LTU)	2	2
Yannick Szczepaniak (FRA)	1	1
Yury Patrikeyev (ARM)	2	1	3
Jalmar Sjöberg (SWE)	1	1	0

== Final standing ==
Rank	Athlete
1st place, gold medalist(s)	Mijaín López (CUB)
2nd place, silver medalist(s)	Mindaugas Mizgaitis (LTU)
3rd place, bronze medalist(s)	Yannick Szczepaniak (FRA)
3rd place, bronze medalist(s)	Yury Patrikeyev (ARM)
5	Jalmar Sjöberg (SWE)
6	Dremiel Byers (USA)
7	Mihály Deák-Bárdos (HUN)
8	Liu Deli (CHN)
9	Anton Botev (AZE)
10	Siarhei Artsiukhin (BLR)
11	Marek Mikulski (POL)
12	Ivan Ivanov (BUL)
13	Davyd Saldadze (UZB)
14	Masoud Hashemzadeh (IRI)
15	Ari Taub (CAN)
16	Oleksandr Chernetskyi (UKR)
17	Panagiotis Papadopoulos (GRE)
18	Yasser Sakr (EGY)
19	Rıza Kayaalp (TUR)
DQ	Khasan Baroev (RUS)

- Khasan Baroev of Russia originally won the silver medal, but he was disqualified after he tested positive for Chlorodehydromethyltestosterone in November 2016.
