= 2009 European Wrestling Championships =

- Host city: Vilnius, Lithuania
- Dates: 31 March – 5 April 2009
- Stadium: Utenos Pramogų Arena

Champions
- Freestyle: Azerbaijan
- Greco-Roman: Russia
- Women: Russia

The 2009 FILA European Wrestling Championships were held in Vilnius, Lithuania. The event took place from 31 March to 5 April 2009.

== Bids ==
Five countries showed interest in hosting the tournament, but only two were shortlisted: Vilnius (Lithuania) and Antalya (Turkey). CELA picked Vilnius at 2008 in Tampere and FILA confirmed the choice in Beijing during Olympic games.

== Venue ==
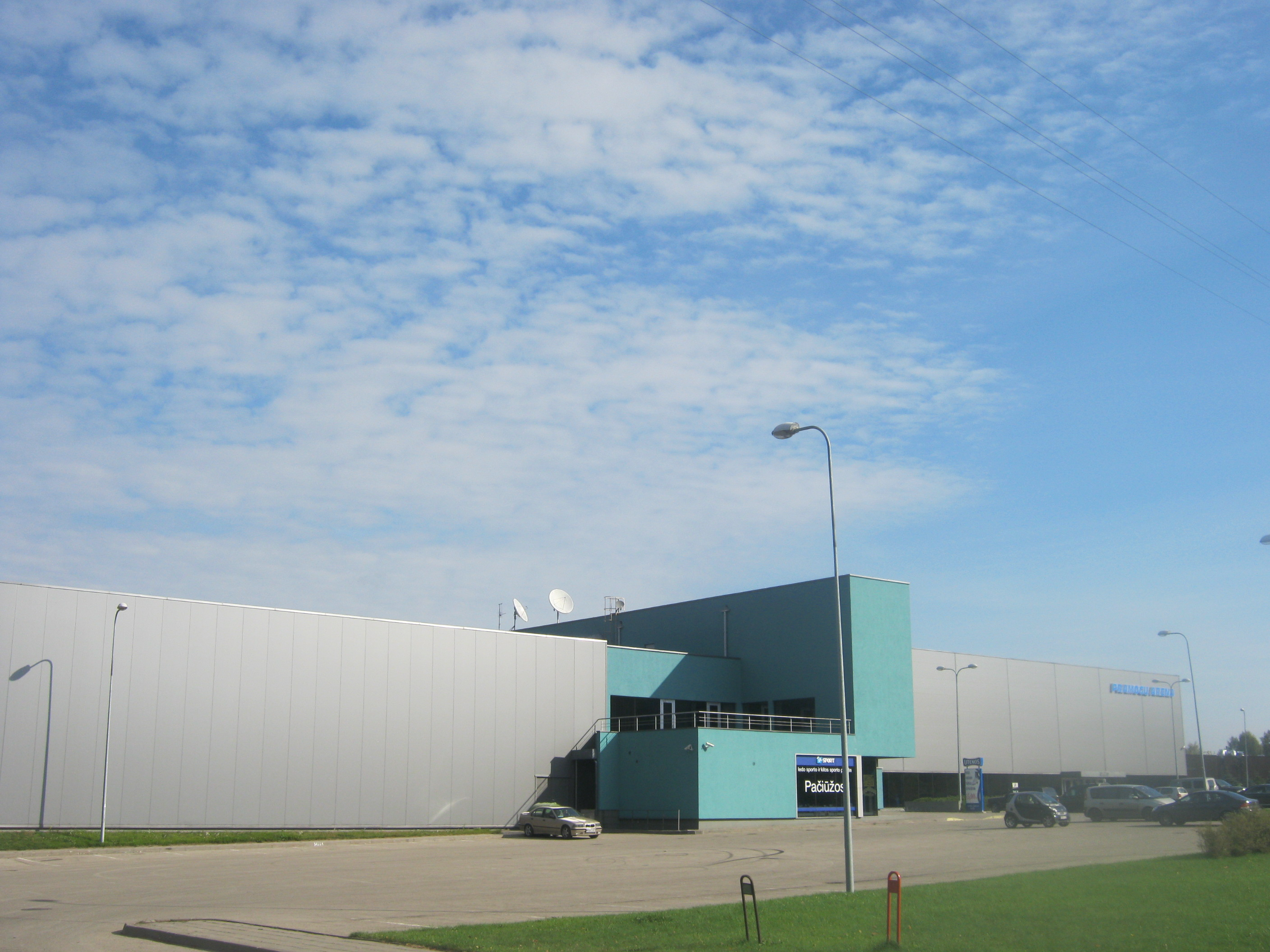
Utenos pramogų arena

Championships were held in Utenos pramogų arena.

== Medal table ==
| Rank | Nation | Gold | Silver | Bronze | Total |
|---|---|---|---|---|---|
| 1 | Russia (RUS) | 7 | 4 | 5 | 16 |
| 2 | Azerbaijan (AZE) | 5 | 2 | 2 | 9 |
| 3 | Ukraine (UKR) | 3 | 3 | 5 | 11 |
| 4 | Armenia (ARM) | 2 | 1 | 2 | 5 |
| 5 | Poland (POL) | 1 | 2 | 1 | 4 |
| 6 | Sweden (SWE) | 1 | 1 | 3 | 5 |
| 7 | Bulgaria (BUL) | 1 | 0 | 5 | 6 |
| 8 | Finland (FIN) | 1 | 0 | 1 | 2 |
| 9 | Turkey (TUR) | 0 | 2 | 4 | 6 |
| 10 | Belarus (BLR) | 0 | 2 | 3 | 5 |
| 11 | Georgia (GEO) | 0 | 1 | 3 | 4 |
| 12 | Romania (ROU) | 0 | 1 | 2 | 3 |
| 13 | Hungary (HUN) | 0 | 1 | 1 | 2 |
| 14 | Lithuania (LTU) | 0 | 1 | 0 | 1 |
| 15 | Germany (GER) | 0 | 0 | 2 | 2 |
| 16 | Czech Republic (CZE) | 0 | 0 | 1 | 1 |
| 16 | France (FRA) | 0 | 0 | 1 | 1 |
| 16 | Italy (ITA) | 0 | 0 | 1 | 1 |
| Totals (18 entries) | | 21 | 21 | 42 | 84 |

== Team ranking ==
| Rank | Men's freestyle | | Men's Greco-Roman | | Women's freestyle | |
| Rank | Team | Points | Team | Points | Team | Points |
|---|---|---|---|---|---|---|
| 1 | Azerbaijan | 63 | Russia | 54 | Russia | 60 |
| 2 | Russia | 43 | Poland | 31 | Ukraine | 49 |
| 3 | Ukraine | 41 | Armenia | 29 | Poland | 42 |
| 4 | Turkey | 39 | Azerbaijan | 29 | Romania | 27 |
| 5 | Armenia | 38 | Belarus | 26 | Azerbaijan | 26 |
| 6 | Georgia | 37 | Sweden | 25 | Sweden | 26 |
| 7 | Bulgaria | 27 | Turkey | 24 | Hungary | 21 |
| 8 | Belarus | 21 | Georgia | 22 | Belarus | 21 |
| 9 | Moldova | 17 | Ukraine | 21 | Spain | 19 |
| 10 | Greece | 11 | Bulgaria | 20 | Bulgaria | 18 |

== Medal summary ==
=== Men's freestyle ===
| Event | Gold | Silver | Bronze |
|---|---|---|---|
| 55 kg | (Russia) Nariman Israpilov | (Georgia (country)) Besarion Gochashvili | (Belarus) Vladislav Andreev |
| 55 kg | (Russia) Nariman Israpilov | (Georgia (country)) Besarion Gochashvili | (Bulgaria) Radoslav Velikov |
| 60 kg | (Azerbaijan) Zelimkhan Huseynov | (Russia) Adam Batirov | (Georgia (country)) Malkhaz Kurdiani |
| 60 kg | (Azerbaijan) Zelimkhan Huseynov | (Russia) Adam Batirov | (Ukraine) Vasyl Fedoryshyn |
| 66 kg | (Ukraine) Andriy Stadnik | (Azerbaijan) Jabrail Hasanov | (Georgia (country)) Malkhaz Muziashvili |
| 66 kg | (Ukraine) Andriy Stadnik | (Azerbaijan) Jabrail Hasanov | (Armenia) Zhirayr Hovhannisyan |
| 74 kg | (Azerbaijan) Chamsulvara Chamsulvarayev | (Turkey) Fırat Binici | (Bulgaria) Kiril Terziev |
| 74 kg | (Azerbaijan) Chamsulvara Chamsulvarayev | (Turkey) Fırat Binici | (Belarus) Murad Gaidarov |
| 84 kg | (Russia) Soslan Ktsoyev | (Ukraine) Ibrahim Aldatov | (Azerbaijan) Novruz Temrezov |
| 84 kg | (Russia) Soslan Ktsoyev | (Ukraine) Ibrahim Aldatov | (Turkey) Gökhan Yavaşer |
| 96 kg | (Azerbaijan) Khetag Gazyumov | (Russia) Georgy Ketoev | (Turkey) Serhat Balcı |
| 96 kg | (Azerbaijan) Khetag Gazyumov | (Russia) Georgy Ketoev | (Armenia) Edgar Yenokyan |
| 120 kg | (Azerbaijan) Ali Isaev | (Armenia) Ruslan Basiev | (Ukraine) Vasili Tismenetski |
| 120 kg | (Azerbaijan) Ali Isaev | (Armenia) Ruslan Basiev | (Turkey) Recep Kara |

=== Men's Greco-Roman ===
| Event | Gold | Silver | Bronze |
|---|---|---|---|
| 55 kg | (Finland) Jani Haapamäki | (Poland) Mariusz Łoś | (Bulgaria) Aleksandar Kostadinov |
| 55 kg | (Finland) Jani Haapamäki | (Poland) Mariusz Łoś | (Russia) Bekhan Mankiev |
| 60 kg | (Russia) Islambek Albiev | (Poland) Edward Barsegjan | (Bulgaria) Ivo Angelov |
| 60 kg | (Russia) Islambek Albiev | (Poland) Edward Barsegjan | (Romania) Eusebiu Diaconu |
| 66 kg | (Russia) Ambako Vachadze | (Belarus) Mikhail Siamionau | (Sweden) Sharur Vardanyan |
| 66 kg | (Russia) Ambako Vachadze | (Belarus) Mikhail Siamionau | (Georgia (country)) Manuchar Tskhadaia |
| 74 kg | (Armenia) Arsen Julfalakyan | (Ukraine) Volodymyr Shatskykh | (Turkey) Selçuk Çebi |
| 74 kg | (Armenia) Arsen Julfalakyan | (Ukraine) Volodymyr Shatskykh | (Belarus) Aliaksandr Kikiniou |
| 84 kg | (Russia) Alexei Mishin | (Turkey) Nazmi Avluca | (Ukraine) Vitaliy Lishchynskyy |
| 84 kg | (Russia) Alexei Mishin | (Turkey) Nazmi Avluca | (Azerbaijan) Shalva Gadabadze |
| 96 kg | (Russia) Aslanbek Khushtov | (Lithuania) Mindaugas Ežerskis | (Czech Republic) Marek Švec |
| 96 kg | (Russia) Aslanbek Khushtov | (Lithuania) Mindaugas Ežerskis | (Sweden) Jimmy Lidberg |
| 120 kg | (Armenia) Yury Patrikeyev | (Sweden) Jalmar Sjöberg | (Hungary) Mihály Deák-Bárdos |
| 120 kg | (Armenia) Yury Patrikeyev | (Sweden) Jalmar Sjöberg | (Germany) Nico Schmidt |

=== Women's freestyle ===
| Event | Gold | Silver | Bronze |
|---|---|---|---|
| 48 kg | (Azerbaijan) Mariya Stadnik | (Romania) Estera Dobre | (Finland) Sarianne Savola |
| 48 kg | (Azerbaijan) Mariya Stadnik | (Romania) Estera Dobre | (Russia) Lilia Kaskarakova |
| 51 kg | (Russia) Ekaterina Krasnova | (Hungary) Emese Szabó | (Ukraine) Yuliya Blahinya |
| 51 kg | (Russia) Ekaterina Krasnova | (Hungary) Emese Szabó | (Italy) Francine De Paola |
| 55 kg | (Ukraine) Nataliya Synyshyn | (Belarus) Alena Filipava | (Russia) Natalya Smirnova |
| 55 kg | (Ukraine) Nataliya Synyshyn | (Belarus) Alena Filipava | (Romania) Ana Maria Pavăl |
| 59 kg | (Sweden) Johanna Mattsson | (Ukraine) Irina Khariv | (Russia) Yulia Rekvava |
| 59 kg | (Sweden) Johanna Mattsson | (Ukraine) Irina Khariv | (France) Meryem Selloum |
| 63 kg | (Poland) Monika Michalik | (Russia) Alena Kartashova | (Sweden) Henna Johansson |
| 63 kg | (Poland) Monika Michalik | (Russia) Alena Kartashova | (Germany) Stefanie Stüber |
| 67 kg | (Ukraine) Kateryna Burmistrova | (Azerbaijan) Zumrud Gurbanhajiyeva | (Bulgaria) Ralitsa Ivanova |
| 67 kg | (Ukraine) Kateryna Burmistrova | (Azerbaijan) Zumrud Gurbanhajiyeva | (Russia) Yulia Bartnovskaia |
| 72 kg | (Bulgaria) Stanka Zlateva | (Russia) Alena Starodubtseva | (Poland) Agnieszka Wieszczek |
| 72 kg | (Bulgaria) Stanka Zlateva | (Russia) Alena Starodubtseva | (Ukraine) Svetlana Saenko |
