= Yasser Sakr =

Egyptian Greco-Roman wrestler

Personal information
- Full name: Yasser Abdel Rahman Sakr
- Nationality: Egypt
- Born: 1 December 1977 (age 48)
- Height: 1.80 m (5 ft 11 in)
- Weight: 120 kg (265 lb)

Sport
- Sport: Wrestling
- Event: Greco-Roman
Medal record
Men's Greco-Roman wrestling
Representing Egypt
Mediterranean Games
Bronze medal – third place	2005 Almería	120 kg

Yasser Abdel Rahman Sakr (Arabic: ياسر عبد الرحمن صقر; born December 1, 1977) is an amateur Egyptian Greco-Roman wrestler, who played for the men's super heavyweight category. He won a bronze medal for his category at the 2005 Mediterranean Games in Almería, Spain.

Sakr represented Egypt at the 2008 Summer Olympics in Beijing, where he competed for the men's 120 kg class. He received a bye for the preliminary round of sixteen, before losing out to Armenia's Yury Patrikeyev, with a two-set technical score (1–5, 0–7), and a classification point score of 1–3.
