= Wrestling at the 2005 Mediterranean Games =

Wrestling competition

- Venue: Huércal de Almería Sports Hall
- Dates: 26–29 June

The Wrestling Competition at the 2005 Mediterranean Games was held in the Huércal de Almería Sports Hall in Almería, Spain, from June 26 to July 1, 2005.

== Medal table ==
Rank	Nation	Gold	Silver	Bronze	Total
1	Turkey	5	5	5	15
2	Egypt	4	3	5	12
3	France	3	2	6	11
4	Greece	3	2	4	9
5	Spain	1	3	4	8
6	Serbia and Montenegro	1	1	1	3
7	Italy	1	0	7	8
8	Syria	0	2	3	5
9	Tunisia	0	0	1	1
Totals (9 entries)		18	18	36	72

== Medalists ==
=== Men's freestyle ===
Event	Gold	Silver	Bronze
55 kg	(Spain) Francisco Sánchez	(Syria) Firas Rifaei	(Turkey) Ramazan Demir (France) Hamza Fatah
60 kg	(Egypt) Hassan İbrahim	(Turkey) Tevfik Odabaşı	(France) Didier Païs (Greece) Valerios Kogouasvili
66 kg	(France) Vadim Guigolaev	(Syria) Mazen Kadmani	(Turkey) Levent Kaleli (Egypt) Walid El Aal
74 kg	(Greece) Theodosios Pavlidis	(Turkey) Fahrettin Özata	(France) Rachid Ben Ali (Italy) Salvatore Rinella
84 kg	(Turkey) Serhat Balcı	(Greece) Lazaros Loizidis	(Italy) Anthony Fasugba (Egypt) Mahmoud Attia
96 kg	(Turkey) Hakan Koç	(France) Vincent Aka-Akesse	(Greece) Aftantil Xanthopoulos (Egypt) Saleh Emara
120 kg	(Turkey) Aydın Polatçı	(Egypt) Hisham Mohamed	(Italy) Francesco Miano-Petta (Syria) Akil Kahli

=== Men's Greco-Roman ===
Event	Gold	Silver	Bronze
55 kg	(Serbia and Montenegro) Kristijan Fris	(Egypt) Mohamed Abou	(Turkey) Erkan Dündar (Spain) Vicente García
60 kg	(Egypt) Ashraf El Gharably	(Serbia and Montenegro) Davor Štefanek	(Turkey) Uğur Tüfenk (Syria) Zakaria Nashed
66 kg	(Turkey) Selçuk Çebi	(Spain) Moisés Sánchez	(Italy) Tiziano Corriga (Syria) Yaser Salih
74 kg	(Turkey) Mahmut Altay	(Egypt) Ahmed Salem	(Spain) José Alberto Recuero (France) Christophe Guenot
84 kg	(Egypt) Mohamed Abdelfatah	(Turkey) Serkan Özden	(France) Melonin Noumonvi (Tunisia) Amor Hamba
96 kg	(Egypt) Karam Gaber	(Greece) Georgios Koutsioumpas	(Turkey) Mehmet Özal (Serbia and Montenegro) Radomir Petković
120 kg	(Greece) Xenofon Koutsioumpas	(Turkey) Yekta Yılmaz Gül	(Italy) Daniele Ficara (Egypt) Yasser Sakr

=== Women's freestyle ===
Event	Gold	Silver	Bronze
48 kg	(Greece) Fani Psatha	(France) Anne Deluntsch	(Egypt) Sahar El Sayed (Spain) Sara Sanchez
51 kg	(France) Vanessa Boubryemm	(Turkey) Zeynep Yıldırım	(Spain) Maria Serrano (Italy) Francine De Paola
55 kg	(France) Anna Gomis	(Spain) Minerva Montero	(Greece) Sofia Poumpouridou (Italy) Sabrina Esposito
59 kg	(Italy) Diletta Giampiccolo	(Spain) Seba Jimenez	(France) Audrey Prieto (Greece) Evangeli Chrysi
