= List of flag bearers for Cuba at the Olympics =

Cuba at the Olympics
- IOC code: CUB
- NOC: Cuban Olympic Committee
- Medals: Gold 86 Silver 70 Bronze 88 Total 244

Summer appearances
- 1900; 1904; 1908–1920; 1924; 1928; 1932–1936; 1948; 1952; 1956; 1960; 1964; 1968; 1972; 1976; 1980; 1984–1988; 1992; 1996; 2000; 2004; 2008; 2012; 2016; 2020; 2024

This is a list of flag bearers who have represented Cuba at the Olympics.

Flag bearers carry the national flag of their country at the opening ceremony of the Olympic Games.

#	Event year	Season	Flag bearer	Sport
1	1924	Summer	Ramón Fonst	Fencing
2	1928	Summer	José Barrientos	Athletics
3	1948	Summer	Raúl García	Basketball
4	1952	Summer	Fico López	Basketball
5	1956	Summer	Manuel Sanguily	Swimming
6	1960	Summer	José Yañez	Wrestling
7	1964	Summer	Ernesto Varona	Weightlifting
8	1968	Summer	Héctor Ramírez	Gymnastics
9	1972	Summer	Teófilo Stevenson	Boxing
10	1976	Summer	Teófilo Stevenson	Boxing
11	1980	Summer	Teófilo Stevenson	Boxing
12	1992	Summer	Héctor Milián	Wrestling
13	1996	Summer	Rolando Tucker	Fencing
14	2000	Summer	Félix Savón	Boxing
15	2004	Summer	Iván Pedroso	Athletics
16	2008	Summer	Mijaín López	Wrestling
17	2012	Summer	Mijaín López	Wrestling
18	2016	Summer	Mijaín López	Wrestling
19	2020	Summer	Mijaín López	Wrestling
19	2020	Summer	Yaime Perez	Athletics
20	2024	Summer	Julio César La Cruz	Boxing
20	2024	Summer	Idalys Ortiz	Judo

== See also ==
- Cuba at the Olympics
