= Ruslan Basiev =

Armenian wrestler (born 1979)

Personal information
- Born: 20 June 1979 (age 47) Dagestan
- Height: 1.88 m (6 ft 2 in)
- Weight: 120 kg (260 lb)

Sport
- Sport: Wrestling
- Event: Freestyle
- Coached by: Aslan Gabaraev; Araik Baghdadyan
Medal record
Representing Armenia
Men's Freestyle Wrestling
World Championships
| Bronze medal – third place | 2006 Guangzhou | 120 kg |
European Championship
| Silver medal – second place | 2009 Vilnius | 120 kg |

Ruslan Basiev (born 20 June 1979) is a former Armenian and Russian Freestyle wrestler of Ossetian descent.

== Biography ==
Ruslan Basiev was born on 20 June 1979. He took up freestyle wrestling in 1995 under the guidance of Aslan Gabaraev. Basiev won a bronze medal at the 2005 Russian Championships in Krasnodar. In 2006, he defected to the Armenian national freestyle wrestling team. That same year, Basiev won a bronze medal at the 2006 World Wrestling Championships in Guangzhou. He won a silver medal at the 2009 European Wrestling Championships in Vilnius. In 2010, he came in second place at the international tournament "Takhti Cup" in Isfahan. Basiev became an Armenian Champion in 2010 and 2011. He was unable to qualify for the 2012 Summer Olympics. In 2012, the head coach of the Armenian freestyle wrestling team Araik Baghdadyan thanked him for his performances in the national team and said that Ruslan will not compete for the national team anymore. Basiev returned to his native Dagestan.
