= Ivan Ivanov (wrestler, born 1986) =

Bulgarian wrestler

Personal information
- Nationality: Bulgaria
- Born: 24 August 1976 (age 49) Sofia, Bulgaria
- Height: 1.92 m (6 ft 3 1/2 in)
- Weight: 107 kg (236 lb)

Sport
- Sport: Wrestling
- Event: Greco-Roman
- Club: Slavia Litex
- Coached by: Stojan Dobrev

Ivan Ivanov (Bulgarian: Иван Иванов; born August 24, 1986, in Sofia) is an amateur Bulgarian Greco-Roman wrestler, who competed in the men's super heavyweight category. Ivanov qualified for the men's 120 kg class at the 2008 Summer Olympics in Beijing, after placing third from the Olympic Qualifying Tournament in Novi Sad, Serbia. He received a bye for the preliminary round of sixteen, before losing out to France's Yannick Szczepaniak, with a classification point score of 1–3.
