= Radomir Petković =

Serbian wrestler (1986)

Personal information
- Born: Radomir Petković; November 26, 1986 (age 39) Belgrade, SR Serbia, SFR Yugoslavia

Professional wrestling career
- Ring name: King Konstantine
- Trained by: WWE Performance Center
- Debut: December 3, 2015

Radomir Petković (Serbian Cyrillic: Радомир Петковић, born November 26, 1986) is a Serbian professional wrestler and former amateur wrestler. He is best known for his time in WWE, in their developmental territory NXT as King Konstantine.

== Amateur wrestling career ==
Radomir Petković
Medal record

Representing Serbia

Men's Greco-Roman wrestling

European Championships
Silver medal – second place	2010 Baku	120kg

Mediterranean Games
Bronze medal – third place	2005 Almeria	96kg
Bronze medal – third place	2009 Pescara	120kg

Men's freestyle wrestling

Mediterranean Games
Bronze medal – third place	2009 Pescara	120kg

Petković won two bronze medals in Greco-Roman and Freestyle wrestling at the 2009 Mediterranean Games in Pescara, Italy. He became European vice-champion at the 2010 European Wrestling Championships in Baku, Azerbaijan.

== Professional wrestling career ==
=== WWE ===
==== NXT (2015–2016) ====
On April 13, 2015, it was announced that Petković had signed a developmental contract with WWE and begun training to become a professional wrestler at the WWE Performance Center in Orlando, Florida. On December 3, 2015, he had his first professional wrestling match in a NXT House Show as King Konstantine. On August 18, 2016, it was announced that Petković had been released from his WWE contract.
