= Evgeny Artyukhin Sr. =

Soviet Greco-Roman wrestler

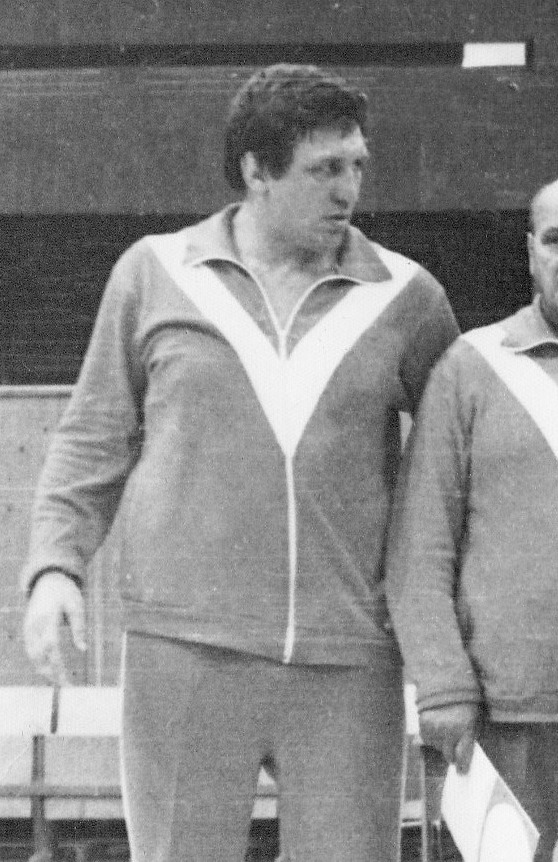

Personal information
- Born: 17 June 1949 Tambov Oblast, Russia
- Died: 12 July 2008 (aged 59) Adler Microdistrict, Russia

Sport
- Sport: Greco-Roman wrestling
Medal record
Representing the Soviet Union
World Championships
| Gold medal – first place | 1983 Kiev | +100 kg |
| Bronze medal – third place | 1981 Oslo | +100 kg |
European Championships
| Bronze medal – third place | 1982 Varna | +100 kg |
| Bronze medal – third place | 1983 Budapest | +100 kg |

Yevgeny Timofeyevich Artyukhin (Russian: Евгений Тимофеевич Артюхин, 17 June 1949 – 12 July 2008) was a Soviet heavyweight Greco-Roman wrestler. He won a world title in 1983, as well as three bronze medals at the world and European championships in 1981–83. He missed the 1984 Summer Olympics due to their boycott by the Soviet Union. After retiring from senior competitions, he worked as a coach, bringing his son Sergei to an international level in Greco-Roman wrestling. He also continued competing in the masters category and won the Russian heavyweight title in 1995.

He also was a professional wrestler in 1989 when he was a member of the Red Bull Army stable with Russians wrestlers Salman Hashimikov, Victor Zangiev, and others for New Japan Pro Wrestling.

Artyukhin died during a training meetup in Adler, aged 59. Since 1993, a wrestling tournament has been held in Tambov in his honor. His other son Yevgeny Jr. became an ice hockey player.
