= 2006 World Wrestling Championships =

- Host city: Guangzhou, China
- Dates: 25 September – 1 October 2006
- Stadium: Tianhe Gymnasium

Champions
- Freestyle: Russia
- Greco-Roman: Turkey
- Women: Japan

The 2006 World Wrestling Championships were held at the Tianhe Gymnasium in Guangzhou, China. The event took place from September 25 to October 1, 2006.

== Medal table ==
Rank	Nation	Gold	Silver	Bronze	Total
1	Japan	5	1	2	8
2	Russia	3	2	6	11
3	China	2	3	0	5
4	United States	2	1	6	9
5	Iran	2	1	3	6
6	Ukraine	2	0	2	4
7	Bulgaria	2	0	1	3
8	Uzbekistan	1	0	2	3
9	Egypt	1	0	0	1
9	Estonia	1	0	0	1
11	Georgia	0	4	1	5
12	Canada	0	2	0	2
13	Turkey	0	1	3	4
14	Belarus	0	1	2	3
14	Cuba	0	1	2	3
16	Azerbaijan	0	1	1	2
17	Czech Republic	0	1	0	1
17	Finland	0	1	0	1
17	Kyrgyzstan	0	1	0	1
20	Poland	0	0	2	2
20	Sweden	0	0	2	2
22	Armenia	0	0	1	1
22	Denmark	0	0	1	1
22	Germany	0	0	1	1
22	India	0	0	1	1
22	Italy	0	0	1	1
22	South Korea	0	0	1	1
22	Spain	0	0	1	1
Totals (28 entries)		21	21	42	84

== Team ranking ==
Rank	Men's freestyle		Men's Greco-Roman		Women's freestyle	
Rank	Team	Points	Team	Points	Team	Points
1	Russia	51	Turkey	39	Japan	67
2	Iran	44	Russia	34	China	41
3	United States	35	United States	34	Canada	30
4	Ukraine	33	Georgia	29	Russia	28
5	Uzbekistan	32	Iran	27	Belarus	24
6	Georgia	32	Ukraine	26	Germany	23
7	Belarus	23	Bulgaria	18	United States	22
8	Bulgaria	22	Hungary	16	Ukraine	22
9	Cuba	18	Finland	15	Poland; Sweden	19
10	Azerbaijan	16	Belarus	15	Poland; Sweden	19

== Medal summary ==
=== Men's freestyle ===
Event	Gold	Silver	Bronze
55 kg	Radoslav Velikov; Bulgaria	Besik Kudukhov; Russia	Namig Abdullayev; Azerbaijan
55 kg	Radoslav Velikov; Bulgaria	Besik Kudukhov; Russia	Sammie Henson; United States
60 kg	Morad Mohammadi; Iran	Mike Zadick; United States	Noriyuki Takatsuka; Japan
60 kg	Morad Mohammadi; Iran	Mike Zadick; United States	Mavlet Batirov; Russia
66 kg	Bill Zadick; United States	Otar Tushishvili; Georgia	Geandry Garzón; Cuba
66 kg	Bill Zadick; United States	Otar Tushishvili; Georgia	Andriy Stadnik; Ukraine
74 kg	Ibragim Aldatov; Ukraine	Ali Asghar Bazri; Iran	Soslan Tigiev; Uzbekistan
74 kg	Ibragim Aldatov; Ukraine	Ali Asghar Bazri; Iran	Donny Pritzlaff; United States
84 kg	Sazhid Sazhidov; Russia	Revaz Mindorashvili; Georgia	Reza Yazdani; Iran
84 kg	Sazhid Sazhidov; Russia	Revaz Mindorashvili; Georgia	Zaurbek Sokhiev; Uzbekistan
96 kg	Khadzhimurat Gatsalov; Russia	Giorgi Gogshelidze; Georgia	Michel Batista; Cuba
96 kg	Khadzhimurat Gatsalov; Russia	Giorgi Gogshelidze; Georgia	Ruslan Sheikhau; Belarus
120 kg	Artur Taymazov; Uzbekistan	Kuramagomed Kuramagomedov; Russia	Fardin Masoumi; Iran
120 kg	Artur Taymazov; Uzbekistan	Kuramagomed Kuramagomedov; Russia	Ruslan Basiev; Armenia

=== Men's Greco-Roman ===
Event	Gold	Silver	Bronze
55 kg	Hamid Sourian; Iran	Rovshan Bayramov; Azerbaijan	Lindsey Durlacher; United States
55 kg	Hamid Sourian; Iran	Rovshan Bayramov; Azerbaijan	Park Eun-chul; South Korea
60 kg	Joe Warren; United States	David Bedinadze; Georgia	Bünyamin Emik; Turkey
60 kg	Joe Warren; United States	David Bedinadze; Georgia	Vyacheslav Dzhaste; Russia
66 kg	Li Yanyan; China	Kanatbek Begaliev; Kyrgyzstan	Sergey Kovalenko; Russia
66 kg	Li Yanyan; China	Kanatbek Begaliev; Kyrgyzstan	Justin Lester; United States
74 kg	Volodymyr Shatskykh; Ukraine	Marko Yli-Hannuksela; Finland	Manuchar Kvirkvelia; Georgia
74 kg	Volodymyr Shatskykh; Ukraine	Marko Yli-Hannuksela; Finland	Mark Madsen; Denmark
84 kg	Mohamed Abdelfatah; Egypt	Nazmi Avluca; Turkey	Aleksey Mishin; Russia
84 kg	Mohamed Abdelfatah; Egypt	Nazmi Avluca; Turkey	Saman Tahmasebi; Iran
96 kg	Heiki Nabi; Estonia	Marek Švec; Czech Republic	Kaloyan Dinchev; Bulgaria
96 kg	Heiki Nabi; Estonia	Marek Švec; Czech Republic	Hamza Yerlikaya; Turkey
120 kg	Khasan Baroev; Russia	Mijaín López; Cuba	Siarhei Artsiukhin; Belarus
120 kg	Khasan Baroev; Russia	Mijaín López; Cuba	İsmail Güzel; Turkey

=== Women's freestyle ===
Event	Gold	Silver	Bronze
48 kg	Chiharu Icho; Japan	Ren Xuecheng; China	Iwona Sadowska; Poland
48 kg	Chiharu Icho; Japan	Ren Xuecheng; China	Francine De Paola; Italy
51 kg	Hitomi Sakamoto; Japan	Lyndsay Belisle; Canada	Patricia Miranda; United States
51 kg	Hitomi Sakamoto; Japan	Lyndsay Belisle; Canada	Alena Adashinskaya; Russia
55 kg	Saori Yoshida; Japan	Mariya Yahorava; Belarus	Minerva Montero; Spain
55 kg	Saori Yoshida; Japan	Mariya Yahorava; Belarus	Ida-Theres Karlsson; Sweden
59 kg	Ayako Shoda; Japan	Su Lihui; China	Alka Tomar; India
59 kg	Ayako Shoda; Japan	Su Lihui; China	Nataliya Synyshyn; Ukraine
63 kg	Kaori Icho; Japan	Xu Haiyan; China	Monika Rogien; Poland
63 kg	Kaori Icho; Japan	Xu Haiyan; China	Helena Allandi; Sweden
67 kg	Jing Ruixue; China	Martine Dugrenier; Canada	Maria Müller; Germany
67 kg	Jing Ruixue; China	Martine Dugrenier; Canada	Eri Sakamoto; Japan
72 kg	Stanka Zlateva; Bulgaria	Kyoko Hamaguchi; Japan	Elena Perepelkina; Russia
72 kg	Stanka Zlateva; Bulgaria	Kyoko Hamaguchi; Japan	Kristie Marano; United States

== Participating nations ==
596 competitors from 75 nations participated.

- Albania (1)
- Armenia (12)
- Australia (6)
- Austria (2)
- Azerbaijan (9)
- Belarus (21)
- Brazil (2)
- Bulgaria (11)
- Cambodia (2)
- Canada (15)
- Chile (1)
- China (21)
- Chinese Taipei (7)
- Colombia (7)
- Croatia (2)
- Cuba (10)
- Czech Republic (5)
- Denmark (3)
- Dominican Republic (2)
- Egypt (7)
- Estonia (4)
- Federated States of Micronesia (1)
- Finland (7)
- France (9)
- Georgia (14)
- Germany (16)
- Great Britain (2)
- Greece (14)
- Guam (1)
- Guatemala (2)
- Hungary (14)
- India (17)
- Iran (14)
- Ireland (1)
- Israel (5)
- Italy (8)
- Ivory Coast (3)
- Japan (21)
- Kazakhstan (19)
- Kyrgyzstan (10)
- Latvia (2)
- Lithuania (6)
- Macedonia (3)
- Marshall Islands (3)
- Mexico (2)
- Moldova (4)
- Mongolia (14)
- Netherlands (3)
- New Zealand (2)
- Nigeria (2)
- North Korea (7)
- Norway (5)
- Palau (2)
- Philippines (9)
- Poland (12)
- Portugal (1)
- Romania (11)
- Russia (20)
- Serbia and Montenegro (2)
- Slovakia (4)
- Slovenia (2)
- South Africa (3)
- South Korea (21)
- Spain (16)
- Sweden (9)
- Switzerland (5)
- Thailand (3)
- Turkey (15)
- Uganda (1)
- Ukraine (21)
- United Arab Emirates (2)
- United States (21)
- Uzbekistan (13)
- Venezuela (9)
- Vietnam (13)
