= 2005 World Wrestling Championships =

- Host city: Budapest, Hungary
- Dates: 26 September – 2 October 2005
- Stadium: László Papp Budapest Sports Arena

Champions
- Freestyle: Russia
- Greco-Roman: Hungary
- Women: Japan

The 2005 World Wrestling Championships were held at the László Papp Budapest Sports Arena in Budapest, Hungary. The event took place from September 26 to October 2, 2005.

== Medal table ==
Rank	Nation	Gold	Silver	Bronze	Total
1	Russia	5	1	3	9
2	Japan	4	1	1	6
3	Bulgaria	2	2	1	5
3	China	2	2	1	5
5	Turkey	2	0	2	4
6	Cuba	1	3	2	6
7	Georgia	1	1	1	3
7	Iran	1	1	1	3
9	United States	1	0	6	7
10	Belarus	1	0	2	3
11	Uzbekistan	1	0	0	1
12	Hungary	0	4	3	7
13	South Korea	0	2	0	2
14	Ukraine	0	1	3	4
15	Canada	0	1	2	3
16	Denmark	0	1	0	1
16	France	0	1	0	1
18	Germany	0	0	2	2
18	Kazakhstan	0	0	2	2
18	Mongolia	0	0	2	2
18	North Korea	0	0	2	2
22	Armenia	0	0	1	1
22	Czech Republic	0	0	1	1
22	Finland	0	0	1	1
22	Kyrgyzstan	0	0	1	1
22	Norway	0	0	1	1
22	Romania	0	0	1	1
Totals (27 entries)		21	21	42	84

== Team ranking ==
Rank	Men's freestyle		Men's Greco-Roman		Women's freestyle	
Rank	Team	Points	Team	Points	Team	Points
1	Russia	54	Hungary	41	Japan	61
2	Cuba	39	Russia	27	China	52
3	Georgia	33	Turkey	26	United States	42
4	Ukraine	27	Cuba	25	Canada	41
5	Bulgaria	26	Bulgaria	24	Russia	30
6	Iran	22	South Korea	23	Ukraine	25
7	Hungary	20	Ukraine	23	Mongolia	17
8	United States	20	Belarus	20	Hungary	14
9	Mongolia	18	Kazakhstan	20	Germany	13
10	Kazakhstan	16	Iran	19	Belarus	12

== Medal summary ==
=== Men's freestyle ===
Event	Gold	Silver	Bronze
55 kg	Dilshod Mansurov; Uzbekistan	Radoslav Velikov; Bulgaria	Jon Hyon-guk; North Korea
55 kg	Dilshod Mansurov; Uzbekistan	Radoslav Velikov; Bulgaria	Bayaraagiin Naranbaatar; Mongolia
60 kg	Alan Dudaev; Russia	Yandro Quintana; Cuba	Martin Berberyan; Armenia
60 kg	Alan Dudaev; Russia	Yandro Quintana; Cuba	Morad Mohammadi; Iran
66 kg	Makhach Murtazaliev; Russia	Serafim Barzakov; Bulgaria	Otar Tushishvili; Georgia
66 kg	Makhach Murtazaliev; Russia	Serafim Barzakov; Bulgaria	Geandry Garzón; Cuba
74 kg	Buvaisar Saitiev; Russia	Árpád Ritter; Hungary	Joe Williams; United States
74 kg	Buvaisar Saitiev; Russia	Árpád Ritter; Hungary	Nikolay Paslar; Bulgaria
84 kg	Revaz Mindorashvili; Georgia	Yoel Romero; Cuba	Magomed Kurugliyev; Kazakhstan
84 kg	Revaz Mindorashvili; Georgia	Yoel Romero; Cuba	Taras Danko; Ukraine
96 kg	Khadzhimurat Gatsalov; Russia	Eldar Kurtanidze; Georgia	Aleksey Krupnyakov; Kyrgyzstan
96 kg	Khadzhimurat Gatsalov; Russia	Eldar Kurtanidze; Georgia	Vasyl Tesmynetskyi; Ukraine
120 kg	Aydın Polatçı; Turkey	Alexis Rodríguez; Cuba	Ottó Aubéli; Hungary
120 kg	Aydın Polatçı; Turkey	Alexis Rodríguez; Cuba	Tolly Thompson; United States

=== Men's Greco-Roman ===
Event	Gold	Silver	Bronze
55 kg	Hamid Sourian; Iran	Park Eun-chul; South Korea	István Majoros; Hungary
55 kg	Hamid Sourian; Iran	Park Eun-chul; South Korea	Yermek Kuketov; Kazakhstan
60 kg	Armen Nazaryan; Bulgaria	Ali Ashkani; Iran	Eusebiu Diaconu; Romania
60 kg	Armen Nazaryan; Bulgaria	Ali Ashkani; Iran	Petr Švehla; Czech Republic
66 kg	Nikolay Gergov; Bulgaria	Kim Min-chul; South Korea	Alain Milián; Cuba
66 kg	Nikolay Gergov; Bulgaria	Kim Min-chul; South Korea	Kim Kum-chol; North Korea
74 kg	Varteres Samurgashev; Russia	Mark Madsen; Denmark	Marko Yli-Hannuksela; Finland
74 kg	Varteres Samurgashev; Russia	Mark Madsen; Denmark	Konstantin Schneider; Germany
84 kg	Alim Selimau; Belarus	Aleksey Mishin; Russia	Sándor Bárdosi; Hungary
84 kg	Alim Selimau; Belarus	Aleksey Mishin; Russia	Nazmi Avluca; Turkey
96 kg	Hamza Yerlikaya; Turkey	Lajos Virág; Hungary	Vasily Teploukhov; Russia
96 kg	Hamza Yerlikaya; Turkey	Lajos Virág; Hungary	Justin Ruiz; United States
120 kg	Mijaín López; Cuba	Mihály Deák-Bárdos; Hungary	Siarhei Artsiukhin; Belarus
120 kg	Mijaín López; Cuba	Mihály Deák-Bárdos; Hungary	Yekta Yılmaz Gül; Turkey

=== Women's freestyle ===
Event	Gold	Silver	Bronze
48 kg	Ren Xuecheng; China	Iryna Merleni; Ukraine	Carol Huynh; Canada
48 kg	Ren Xuecheng; China	Iryna Merleni; Ukraine	Makiko Sakamoto; Japan
51 kg	Hitomi Sakamoto; Japan	Vanessa Boubryemm; France	Tsogtbazaryn Enkhjargal; Mongolia
51 kg	Hitomi Sakamoto; Japan	Vanessa Boubryemm; France	Wen Juling; China
55 kg	Saori Yoshida; Japan	Su Lihui; China	Natalia Golts; Russia
55 kg	Saori Yoshida; Japan	Su Lihui; China	Tonya Verbeek; Canada
59 kg	Ayako Shoda; Japan	Marianna Sastin; Hungary	Sally Roberts; United States
59 kg	Ayako Shoda; Japan	Marianna Sastin; Hungary	Lene Aanes; Norway
63 kg	Kaori Icho; Japan	Jing Ruixue; China	Sara McMann; United States
63 kg	Kaori Icho; Japan	Jing Ruixue; China	Volha Khilko; Belarus
67 kg	Meng Lili; China	Martine Dugrenier; Canada	Elena Perepelkina; Russia
67 kg	Meng Lili; China	Martine Dugrenier; Canada	Katie Downing; United States
72 kg	Iris Smith; United States	Kyoko Hamaguchi; Japan	Anita Schätzle; Germany
72 kg	Iris Smith; United States	Kyoko Hamaguchi; Japan	Svetlana Saenko; Ukraine

== Participating nations ==
621 competitors from 81 nations participated.

- American Samoa (1)
- Argentina (1)
- Armenia (11)
- Australia (4)
- Austria (5)
- Azerbaijan (10)
- Belarus (20)
- Bosnia and Herzegovina (2)
- Brazil (4)
- Bulgaria (14)
- Canada (14)
- Central African Republic (1)
- Chile (1)
- China (20)
- Chinese Taipei (2)
- Croatia (1)
- Cuba (13)
- Cyprus (1)
- Czech Republic (6)
- Denmark (2)
- Dominican Republic (3)
- Egypt (5)
- Estonia (4)
- Finland (8)
- France (12)
- Georgia (15)
- Germany (20)
- Great Britain (4)
- Greece (16)
- Guatemala (3)
- Hungary (21)
- India (18)
- Iran (14)
- Ireland (3)
- Israel (6)
- Italy (14)
- Japan (21)
- Kazakhstan (16)
- Kyrgyzstan (15)
- Latvia (3)
- Lebanon (6)
- Lithuania (9)
- Macedonia (1)
- Malta (1)
- Mexico (1)
- Moldova (6)
- Mongolia (14)
- Morocco (2)
- Netherlands (4)
- New Zealand (1)
- North Korea (4)
- Norway (6)
- Palau (1)
- Panama (1)
- Peru (1)
- Poland (16)
- Portugal (2)
- Puerto Rico (5)
- Qatar (5)
- Romania (17)
- Russia (21)
- Serbia and Montenegro (3)
- Slovakia (7)
- Slovenia (2)
- South Africa (1)
- South Korea (14)
- Spain (9)
- Suriname (3)
- Sweden (7)
- Switzerland (6)
- Syria (3)
- Tajikistan (1)
- Thailand (1)
- Tunisia (2)
- Turkey (18)
- U. S. Virgin Islands (1)
- Ukraine (21)
- United Arab Emirates (1)
- United States (21)
- Uzbekistan (13)
- Venezuela (9)
