= Nico Schmidt =

German wrestler (born 1978)

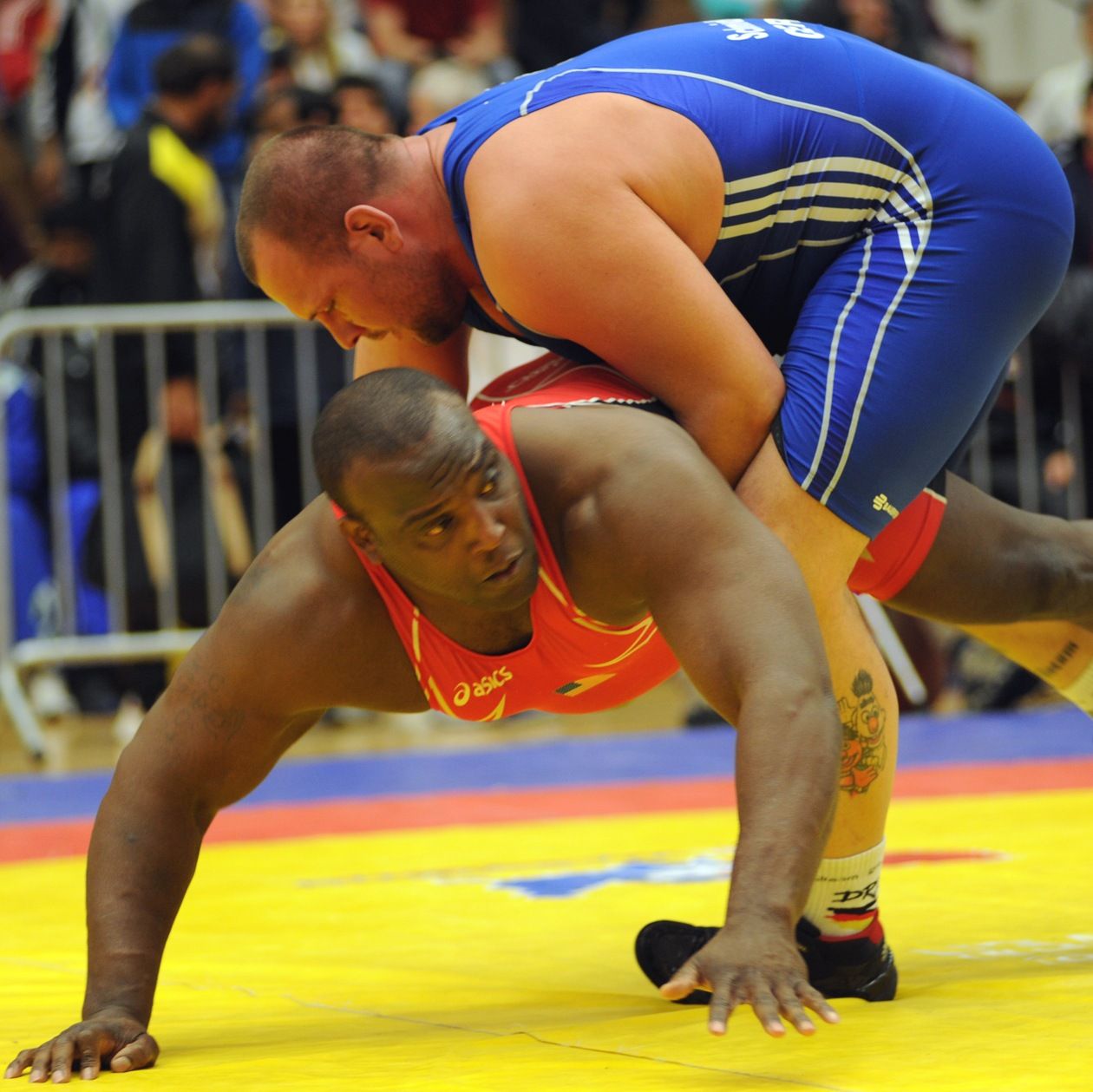
- Nico Schmidt (top) vs. Dremiel Byers in 2012

Personal information
- Nationality: German
- Born: 20 August 1978 (age 47)
- Height: 1.84 m (6 ft 0 in)
- Weight: 120 kg (265 lb; 18 st 13 lb)

Sport
- Sport: Greco-Roman wrestling
- Club: OSP Frankfurt/Oder
- Coached by: Joern Levermann

Achievements and titles
- Personal best: winning the World Military Championships in 2001
Medal record
Representing Germany
European Wrestling Championships
Bronze medal – third place	2009 Vilnius	120 kg

Nico Schmidt (born 20 August 1978) is a German wrestler. He won the World Military Championships in 2001, and finished third in 2000. He also participated in the 2009 and 2011 World Wrestling Championships. Schmidt is a fireman by profession.

== Biography ==
He won a bronze medal in the Greco-Roman super-heavyweight division at the 2009 European Wrestling Championships. At the 2012 Dave Schultz Memorial International he was defeated by Sgt. 1st Class Dremiel Byers.
