= Anton Botev =

Azerbaijani Greco-Roman wrestler

Anton Yuryevich Botev
Personal information
- Nationality: Russia; Azerbaijan
- Born: 25 May 1986 (age 40) Omsk, Russian SFSR
- Height: 1.87 m (6 ft 1 1/2 in)
- Weight: 120 kg (265 lb)

Sport
- Sport: Wrestling
- Event: Greco-Roman
- Club: Neftçi Baku (AZE)
- Coached by: Timershan Kalimulin (AZE)

Anton Botev (born May 25, 1986) is an amateur Azerbaijani Greco-Roman wrestler, who played for the men's super heavyweight category. He is a member of Neftçi Wrestling Club in Baku, and is coached and trained by Timershan Kalimulin.

Botev represented his current nation Azerbaijan at the 2008 Summer Olympics in Beijing, where he competed for in men's 120 kg class. He first defeated Georgian-born Uzbek wrestler and former heavyweight silver medalist David Saldadze in the qualifying round, before losing out his next match to Sweden's Jalmar Sjöberg, who was able to score five points in two straight periods, leaving Botev without a single point.
