= Yekta Yılmaz Gül =

Turkish Greco-Roman wrestler

Personal information
- Nationality: Turkish
- Born: December 1, 1978 (age 47) Tirebolu, Giresun province, Turkey
- Height: 1.94 m (6 ft 4 1/2 in)
- Weight: 120 kg (265 lb)

Sport
- Sport: Wrestling
- Event: Greco-Roman
- Club: İstanbul Büyükşehir Belediyesi S.K.
Medal record
Men's Greco-Roman wrestling
Representing Turkey
World Championships
Bronze medal – third place	2005 Budapest	120 kg
European Championships
Silver medal – second place	2005 Varna	120 kg
Mediterranean Games
Gold medal – first place	2001 Tunis	130 kg
Silver medal – second place	2005 Almeria	120 kg
World Military Championships
Gold medal – first place	2003 Istanbul	130 kg
Gold medal – first place	2006 Baku	130 kg
Vehbi Emre & Hamit Kaplan Tournament
Bronze medal – third place	2010 Istanbul	120 kg
Summer Universiade
Silver medal – second place	2005 İzmir	120 kg

Yekta Yılmaz Gül (born December 1, 1978, in Tirebolu, Giresun Province) is a Turkish professional Greco-Roman wrestler, who competed for the men's 120 kg division. He is a member of the İstanbul Büyükşehir Belediyesi S.K. Gül studied at Niğde University.

Gül competed in the Greco-Roman 120 kg event at the 2004 Summer Olympics placing 13th. He won the silver medal at the 2005 European Wrestling Championships in Varna, Bulgaria and at the 2005 Summer Universiade in İzmir, Turkey, and another silver at the Mediterranean Games in Almeria, Spain the same year. At the 2005 World Wrestling Championships held in Budapest, Hungary, he won the bronze medal.

He won the gold medal at the International Grand Prix Greco-Roman Wrestling Tournament held in Székesfehérvár, Hungary in 2006. Gül won the bronze medal at the 28th International Vehbi Emre Memorial Greco-Roman Tournament held in Istanbul in 2010.
