= Evgeny Artyukhin =

Russian ice hockey player

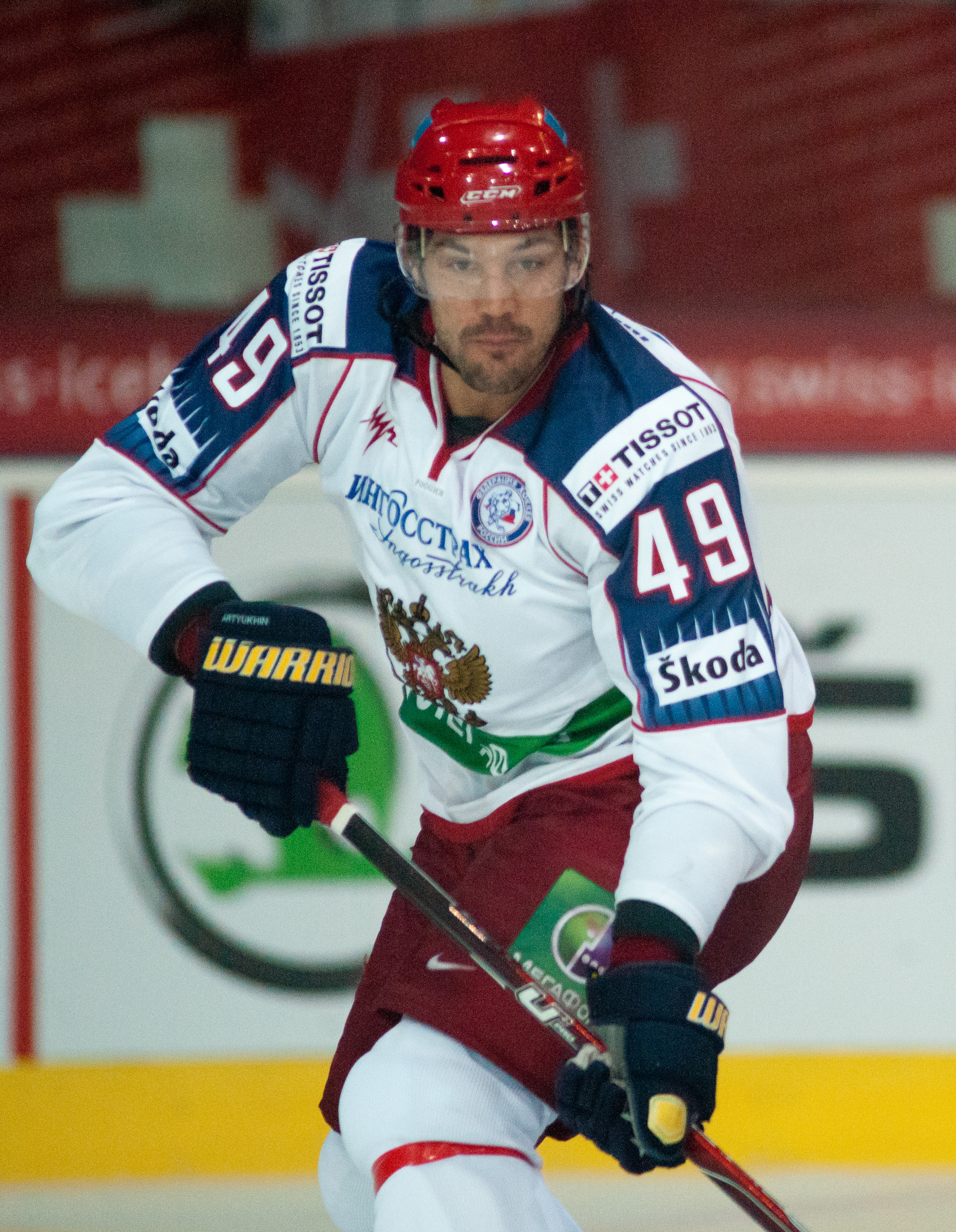
- Artyukhin with Russia in 2011
- Born: 4 April 1983 (age 43) Moscow, Russian SFSR, Soviet Union
- Height: 6 ft 5 in (196 cm)
- Weight: 255 lb (116 kg; 18 st 3 lb)
- Position: Right wing
- Shot: Left
- Played for: HC Vityaz; Tampa Bay Lightning; Lokomotiv Yaroslavl; Avangard Omsk; Anaheim Ducks; Atlanta Thrashers; Atlant Moscow Oblast; CSKA Moscow; SKA Saint Petersburg; Sibir Novosibirsk; Dynamo Moscow; Admiral Vladivostok; Neftekhimik Nizhnekamsk
- National team: Russia
- NHL draft: 94th overall, 2001; Tampa Bay Lightning
- Playing career: 1999–2022

Yevgeni Evgenyevich Artyukhin (Russian: Евге́ний Евге́ньевич Артю́хин; born 4 April 1983) is a Russian former professional ice hockey right winger. He last played competitively for HC Neftekhimik Nizhnekamsk of the Kontinental Hockey League (KHL).

== Playing career ==
After spending most of the 2005–06 season with the Tampa Bay Lightning, Artyukhin left for Russia after contract negotiations soured with Tampa Bay.

When the 2006–07 season ended with Lokomotiv Yaroslavl, Artyukhin rejected a $475,000 contract offer from the Lightning. His agent, Mark Gandler, asked Tampa Bay to trade him, claiming the Lightning were punishing Artyukhin for not re-signing a year before. It was believed Artyukhin was seeking a $1 million contract. In 2007–08, he played for CSKA Moscow, recording 9 points and 99 penalty minutes in 23 games. On 7 July 2008, the Lightning signed Artyukhin to a two-year, $1.9 million contract.

On 13 August 2009, Artyukhin was traded to the Anaheim Ducks in exchange for Drew Miller and a third-round draft pick. On 21 October 2009, Artyukhin was also suspended for three games after slewfooting Dallas Stars' defenceman Matt Niskanen. Although there was no original penalty called by the referees during the match, the NHL suspended him after reviewing the play. Artyukhin later publicly apologized, saying the incident was unintentional.

Evgeny was invited to the 2010 Winter Olympics summer camp for Russian national team, but did not make the final roster cut. On 1 March 2010, he was traded to the Atlanta Thrashers in exchange for Nathan Oystrick and a conditional pick.

On 24 April 2011, Artyukhin received a 5+20 minute penalty for his part in a brawl in Euro Hockey Tour.

In the 2016–17 season, Artyukin signed a one-year contract to captain Sibir Novosibirsk on June 29, 2016. He appeared in a career-high 54 Kontinental Hockey League games, registering five goals and nine points. After his contract expired, Artyukhin signed a one-year contract with Dynamo Moscow on August 28, 2017.

As a free agent, Artyukhin opted to sit out the entirety of the 2018–19 season. On 17 May 2019, Artyukhin resumed his career in agreeing to a one-year contract with his original club, HC Vityaz.

As a free agent leading into the 2021–22 season, Artyukhin was brought in on a one-year contract to add experience by cellar-dwelling Admiral Vladivostok on 28 September 2021. Artyukhin went scoreless in 22 appearances with Admiral before he was traded to Neftekhimik Nizhnekamsk on 21 December 2021.

== Personal life ==
Artyukhin's father, Evgeny Artyukhin, Sr., and elder brother Sergei were international heavyweight Greco-Roman wrestlers.

== Career statistics ==
=== Regular season and playoffs ===
			Regular season					Playoffs
Season	Team	League	GP	G	A	Pts	PIM	GP	G	A	Pts	PIM
1999–2000	Vityaz Podolsk	RUS.2	3	0	0	0	2	—	—	—	—	—
1999–2000	Vityaz Podolsk–2	RUS.3	26	9	8	17	46	—	—	—	—	—
2000–01	Vityaz Podolsk	RSL	24	0	1	1	14	—	—	—	—	—
2001–02	Vityaz Podolsk	RUS.2	49	15	7	22	94	14	0	1	1	24
2001–02	Vityaz Podolsk–2	RUS.3	4	3	1	4	6	—	—	—	—	—
2002–03	Moncton Wildcats	QMJHL	53	13	27	40	204	6	1	2	3	29
2003–04	Pensacola Ice Pilots	ECHL	6	1	0	1	14	—	—	—	—	—
2003–04	Hershey Bears	AHL	36	3	3	6	111	—	—	—	—	—
2004–05	Springfield Falcons	AHL	62	9	19	28	142	—	—	—	—	—
2005–06	Springfield Falcons	AHL	4	2	1	3	4	—	—	—	—	—
2005–06	Tampa Bay Lightning	NHL	72	4	13	17	90	5	1	0	1	6
2006–07	Lokomotiv Yaroslavl	RSL	44	5	8	13	183	1	0	0	0	0
2007–08	Avangard Omsk	RSL	19	3	2	5	40	—	—	—	—	—
2007–08	CSKA Moscow	RSL	23	3	5	8	99	6	4	0	4	6
2008–09	Tampa Bay Lightning	NHL	73	6	10	16	151	—	—	—	—	—
2009–10	Anaheim Ducks	NHL	37	4	5	9	41	—	—	—	—	—
2009–10	Atlanta Thrashers	NHL	17	5	2	7	31	—	—	—	—	—
2010–11	SKA St. Petersburg	KHL	26	4	5	9	115	11	2	1	3	26
2011–12	SKA St. Petersburg	KHL	47	16	7	23	150	14	1	1	2	40
2012–13	SKA St. Petersburg	KHL	30	1	1	2	127	12	3	2	5	10
2013–14	Atlant Mytishchi	KHL	46	4	15	19	176	—	—	—	—	—
2014–15	CSKA Moscow	KHL	48	4	8	12	153	12	2	2	4	16
2015–16	SKA St. Petersburg	KHL	35	0	3	3	64	—	—	—	—	—
2016–17	Sibir Novosibirsk	KHL	54	5	4	9	115	—	—	—	—	—
2017–18	Dynamo Moscow	KHL	42	2	5	7	60	—	—	—	—	—
2019–20	HC Vityaz	KHL	30	1	2	3	66	4	0	1	1	10
2020–21	HC Vityaz	KHL	43	2	2	4	24	—	—	—	—	—
2021–22	Admiral Vladivostok	KHL	22	0	0	0	28	—	—	—	—	—
2021–22	Neftekhimik Nizhnekamsk	KHL	7	0	1	1	10	4	0	0	0	10
NHL totals			199	19	30	49	313	5	1	0	1	6
RSL totals			110	11	16	27	336	7	4	0	4	6
KHL totals			430	39	53	92	1088	57	8	7	15	112

=== International ===
Medal record

Representing Russia

World Junior Championships
Gold medal – first place	2003 Halifax	

IIHF U18 Championships
Gold medal – first place	2001 Helsinki	

Year	Team	Event	Result	GP	G	A	Pts	PIM
2000	Russia	U17	1st place, gold medalist(s)	6	0	0	0	2
2001	Russia	WJC18	1st place, gold medalist(s)	6	1	1	2	4
2003	Russia	WJC	1st place, gold medalist(s)	6	1	0	1	10
2011	Russia	WC	4th	9	2	1	3	24
Junior totals				18	2	1	3	16
Senior totals				9	2	1	3	24
