= Mihály Deák-Bárdos =

Hungarian Greco-Roman wrestler

Personal information
- Nationality: Hungary
- Born: 30 January 1975 (age 51) Miskolc, Hungary
- Height: 195 cm (6 ft 5 in)
- Weight: 120 kg (265 lb)

Sport
- Style: Greco-Roman
- Club: DVTK (2009- ) Vasas SC (2001-2008); Kecskeméti TE (2000); Szegedi BE (1996-2000); Diósgyőri BC ( -1996)
- Coach: Attila Repka
Medal record
Men's Greco-Roman wrestling
Representing Hungary
World Championships
Silver medal – second place	1997 Wrocław	130 kg
Silver medal – second place	2001 Patras	130 kg
Silver medal – second place	2002 Moscow	120 kg
Silver medal – second place	2003 Créteil	120 kg
Silver medal – second place	2005 Budapest	120 kg
European Championships
Gold medal – first place	2001 Istanbul	130 kg
Silver medal – second place	2002 Seinäjoki	120 kg
Silver medal – second place	2003 Belgrade	120 kg
Bronze medal – third place	2000 Moscow	130 kg
Bronze medal – third place	2009 Vilnius	120 kg
Bronze medal – third place	2011 Dortmund	120 kg

Mihály Deák-Bárdos (born 30 January 1975) is a Hungarian amateur Greco-Roman wrestler, who played for the men's super heavyweight category. He is a four-time Olympian, and a six-time medalist at the European Championships. Deák-Bárdos had also won a total of five silver medals at the World Championships, losing out to numerous top-level wrestlers including Alexander Karelin, Rulon Gardner, Khasan Baroyev, and Mijaín López, all of whom were Olympic champions in the same division.

== Wrestling career ==
Born in Miskolc Deák-Bárdos emerged as one of Hungary's most prominent wrestlers. He first competed at the 1993 European Youth Wrestling Championships in Götzis, Austria, where he finished in fourth place, for the 110 kg division. In 1997, Deák-Bárdos achieved his earliest success in wrestling, when he won the silver medal against three-time Olympic champion Alexander Karelin at the World Championships in Wrocław, Poland. After Karelin's retirement in 2000, Deák-Bárdos continued to build success in wrestling by capturing four medals for the super heavyweight division (120–130 kg) at the European Championships, including his first-ever gold from Moscow. He managed to repeat his silver medal streak at the World Championships, when he lost the final match to United States' Rulon Gardner (2001) and Dremiel Byers (2002), and to Russia's Khasan Baroyev (2003), who succeeded Karelin to become an Olympic champion in 2004.

Between 2005 and 2007, Deák-Bárdos, however, suffered numerous setbacks in his sporting career. He lost for the fourth time to Cuba's Mijaín López at the 2005 World Wrestling Championships, coincidentally in his home city, and placed farther from the medal podium at the European Championships. In 2008, Deák-Bárdos recaptured his success in super heavyweight wrestling, after winning the silver medal for his team at the World Wrestling Cup in Szombathely. He also added two bronze medals at the European Championships in Vilnius and in Dortmund.

== Olympic games ==
In addition to his achievements at both the World and European championships, Deák-Bárdos became the first Hungarian wrestler to compete in four consecutive Olympic games since Imre Polyák did so in 1964. He made his official debut at the 2000 Summer Olympics in Sydney, where he competed in the men's 130 kg class. He placed second in the preliminary pool against Bulgarian wrestler and 1996 Olympic bronze medalist Sergei Mureiko and Russia's Alexander Karelin, who previously defeated him at the World Championships three years before, finishing overall in 11th position.

After Karelin's retirement from his fourth Olympics, Deák-Bárdos' medal chances became more open by qualifying for the 120 kg class at the 2004 Summer Olympics in Athens. Once again, he repeated his position in the preliminary pool this time, against Finland's four-time Olympian Juha Ahokas and Iran's Sajjad Barzi, who eventually lost to defending Olympic champion Rulon Gardner in the bronze medal bout.

At the 2008 Summer Olympics in Beijing, Deák-Bárdos reached the second preliminary round of the 120 kg class, by defeating Canadian wrestler Ari Taub, with a score of 6–2. He lost to France's Yannick Szczepaniak, who was able to score one technical point each in the second par terre during the first and final period of the match.

Deák-Bárdos qualified again for the super heavyweight division at his fourth Olympics in London, after placing fifth from the 2011 World Wrestling Championships in Istanbul, Turkey. He first defeated China's Liu Deli in the qualifying round, before losing out his next match to Sweden's Johan Eurén, who eventually won the bronze medal in this event.
