= Panagiotis Papadopoulos =

Greek wrestler (born 1985)

Medal record

Men's Greco-Roman wrestling

Representing Greece

Mediterranean Games
Silver medal – second place	2009 Pescara	120 kg

Panagiotis Papadopoulos (born May 23, 1985, in Thessaloniki, Greece) is a Greek wrestler who specializes in Greco-Roman wrestling. He was a competed at the 2008 Summer Olympics in the super-heavyweight division, losing in his opening bout to Liu Deli from China.
