= İsmail Güzel =

Turkish Greco-Roman wrestler

Personal information
- Nationality: Turkish
- Born: 14 April 1986 (age 40) Konya, Turkey
- Home town: Konya, Turkey
- Education: Physical education Selçuk University
- Height: 1.82 m (6 ft 0 in)
- Weight: 120 kg (265 lb)

Sport
- Country: Turkey
- Sport: Amateur wrestling
- Greco-Roman: 120 kg
- Event: Greco-Roman
- Club: Konya Seker Spor
- Turned pro: 2005
- Coached by: Erdoğan Koçak
- Retired: 2014
Medal record
Men's Greco-Roman wrestling
Representing Turkey
World Championships
Bronze medal – third place	2006 Guangzhou	120 kg
European Championships
Gold medal – first place	2006 Moscow	120 kg
Bronze medal – third place	2007 Sofia	120 kg
World Cup
Bronze medal – third place	2007 Antalya	120 kg
Golden Grand Prix
Silver medal – second place	2012 Szombathely	120 kg
Vehbi Emre & Hamit Kaplan Tournament
Silver medal – second place	2010 Istanbul	120 kg
World University Championship
Gold medal – first place	2014 Pecs	130 kg
World Juniors Championships
Gold medal – first place	2006 Guatemala-City	120 kg
Silver medal – second place	2005 Vilnius	120 kg
European Juniors Championships
Gold medal – first place	2006 Szombathely	120 kg
Gold medal – first place	2005 Wroclaw	120 kg

İsmail Güzel (born April 14, 1986) is a Turkish wrestler.

== Career ==
He won 2006 European Wrestling Championships competing in the 120 kg division of Greco-Roman wrestling. He is a member of the Konya Seker Spor.
