= Jalmar Sjöberg =

Swedish Greco-Roman wrestler

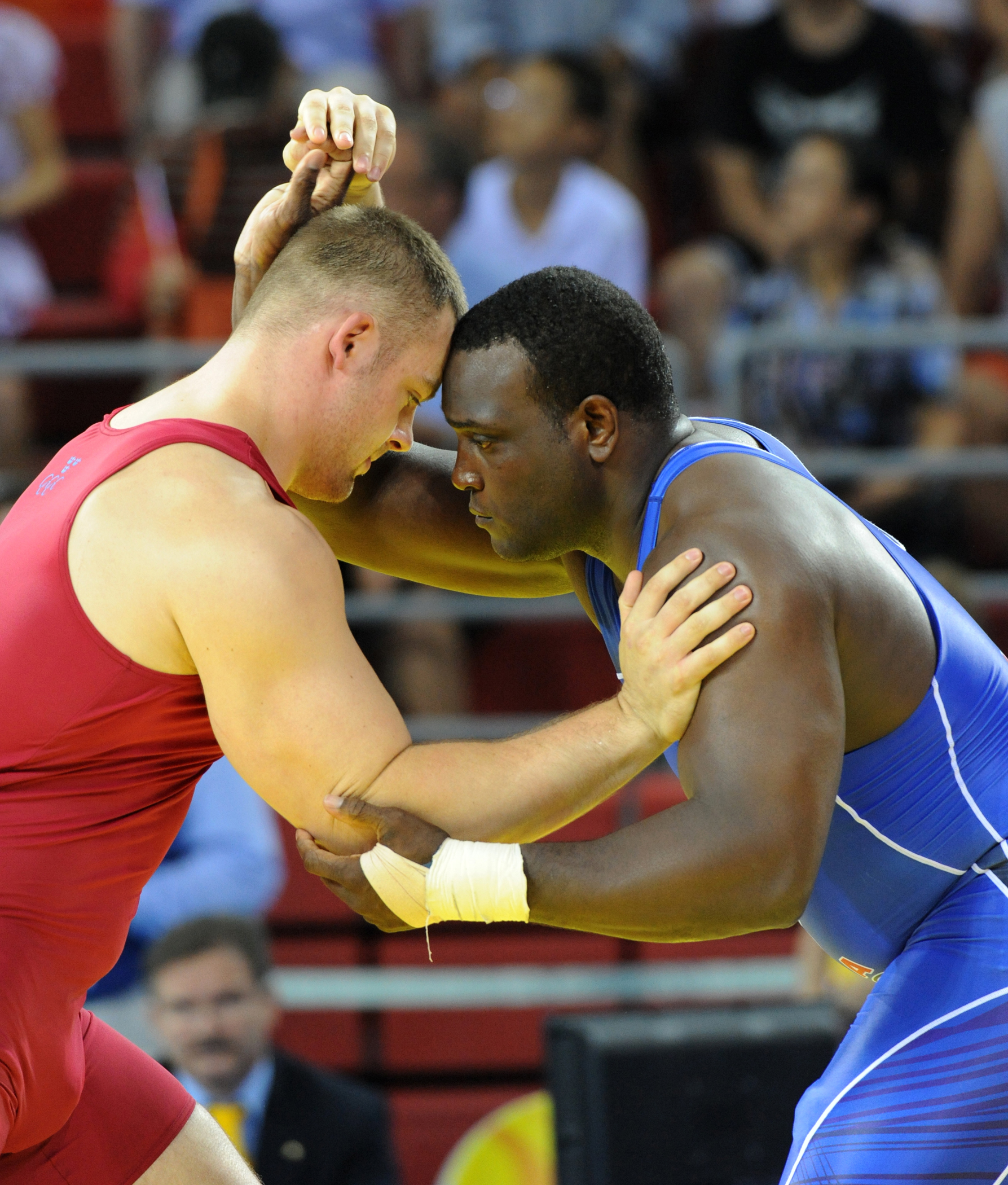
- Jalmar Sjöberg (left) wrestles against United States' Dremiel Byers at the 2008 Summer Olympics

Personal information
- Full name: Jalmar Leonard Sjöberg
- Nationality: Sweden
- Born: 31 March 1985 (age 41) Svalöv, Sweden
- Height: 1.90 m (6 ft 3 in)
- Weight: 120 kg (265 lb)

Sport
- Sport: Wrestling
- Event: Greco-Roman
- Club: BK Ore Vinslöv
- Coached by: Björn Fritz
Medal record
Men's Greco-Roman wrestling
Representing Sweden
World Championships
Bronze medal – third place	2009 Herning	120 kg
European Championships
Silver medal – second place	2009 Vilnius	120 kg
Bronze medal – third place	2007 Sofia	120 kg

Jalmar Leonard Sjöberg (born 31 March 1985) is an amateur Swedish Greco-Roman wrestler. He won a silver medal for the super heavyweight division at the 2009 European Wrestling Championships in Vilnius, Lithuania, and two bronze medals at the 2007 European Wrestling Championships in Sofia, Bulgaria, and at the 2009 FILA World Championships in Herning, Denmark.

Sjöberg qualified for the 120-kg category in men's Greco-Roman wrestling at the 2008 Summer Olympics in Beijing, after winning the championship title at the World Qualification Tournament in Novi Sad, Serbia. He first defeated Poland's Marek Mikulski, and Azerbaijan's Anton Botev in the first two preliminary rounds. Sjoberg eventually upset Dremiel Byers of the United States, a former champion at the 2002 World Wrestling Championships in Moscow, Russia, with a surprising tactical score of 5–2, and a classification point score of 3–1, in the quarterfinal match. Following a defeat for Byers, Sjöberg fought against, and thereby lost to Cuba's Mijaín López, who emerged as the top favorite for this category, in the semi-final match, without receiving a technical score. Sjöberg qualified for the bronze medal bout, but finished in fifth place, after being defeated by Armenia's Yuri Patrikeyev, who scored three closing points in the last period to claim a medal.
