= Marek Mikulski =

Polish Greco-Roman wrestler

Marek Ryszard Mikulski (born 18 March 1981 in Lidzbark Warmiński) is a Polish Greco-Roman wrestler who competed in the 2008 Summer Olympics in Beijing and in the 2004 Summer Olympics.

At the 2008 Summer Olympics he finished 12th in the super-heavyweight competition (120 kg) in wrestling.
