= Mindaugas Mizgaitis =

Lithuanian Greco-Roman wrestler (born 1979)

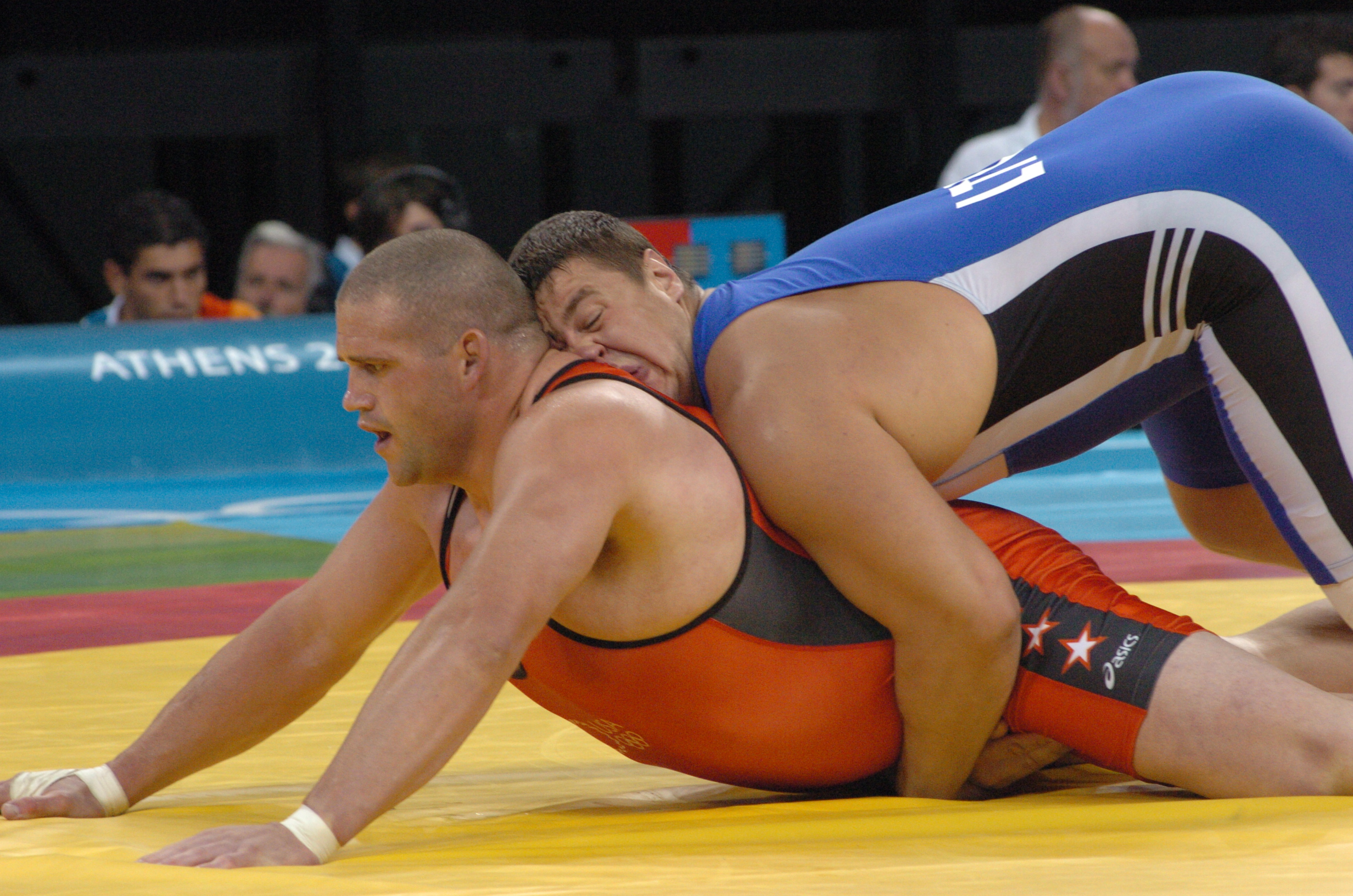
- Mizgaitis (right) and Rulon Gardner (left) at the 2004 Olympics

Personal information
- Nationality: Lithuanian
- Born: 14 October 1979 (age 46) Kaunas, Lithuanian SSR, Soviet Union
- Education: Education Academy, Kaunas
- Height: 190 cm (6 ft 3 in)
- Weight: 120 kg (265 lb)

Sport
- Sport: Greco-Roman wrestling
- Club: Siegfried (Hallbergmoos, Germany)
- Coached by: Valentinas Mizgaitis, Grigori Kazovski
Medal record
Men's Greco-Roman wrestling
Representing Lithuania
Olympics
Silver medal – second place	2008 Beijing	120 kg
European Wrestling Championships
Bronze medal – third place	2010 Baku	120 kg
Universiade
Bronze medal – third place	2005 Izmir	120 kg
Lithuanian Championships
Gold medal – first place	2001 Vilnius	120 kg
Gold medal – first place	2010 Vilnius	120 kg

Mindaugas Mizgaitis (born 14 October 1979) is a retired heavyweight Greco-Roman wrestler from Lithuania. He competed at the 2004 and 2008 Olympics and won a bronze medal in 2008; he was promoted to the second place after disqualification of Khasan Baroev in November 2016. Mizgaitis also competed in several world and European championships between 1999 and 2010 with the best result of third place at the 2010 European and fourth place at the 2003 World Championships.
