= Yury Patrikeyev =

Armenian-Russian Greco-Roman wrestler

Personal information
- Born: 28 September 1979 (age 46) Kirovo-Chepetsk, Soviet Union
- Height: 1.95 m (6 ft 5 in)
- Weight: 120 kg (265 lb)

Sport
- Sport: Wrestling
- Event: Greco-Roman
- Club: Dynamo Krasnodar
- Coached by: Igor Ivanov; Aleksey Shevzov; Samvel Gevorgyan
Medal record
Men's Greco-Roman wrestling
Representing Armenia
Olympic Games
Bronze medal – third place	2008 Beijing	120 kg
World Championships
Silver medal – second place	2010 Moscow	120 kg
Bronze medal – third place	2007 Baku	120 kg
European Championships
Gold medal – first place	2008 Tampere	120 kg
Gold medal – first place	2009 Vilnius	120 kg
Bronze medal – third place	2011 Dortmund	120 kg
Bronze medal – third place	2012 Belgrade	120 kg
World Cup
Silver medal – second place	2009 Clermont-Ferrand	120 kg
Gold medal – first place	2010 Yerevan	120 kg
Representing Russia
World Championships
Bronze medal – third place	2002 Moscow	120 kg
European Championships
Gold medal – first place	2002 Seinaejoki	120 kg
Gold medal – first place	2004 Haparanda	120 kg
World Cup
Silver medal – second place	2005 Tehran	120 kg

Yury Patrikeyev (Armenian: Յուրի Պատրիկեև, Russian: Юрий Николаевич Патрикеев; born 28 September 1979) is an Armenian-Russian Greco-Roman wrestler. He is an Olympic and World Championships medalist and four-time European Champion. Patrikeyev has been awarded the Master of Sport of Russia, International Class title.

== Early life ==
Yury Patrikeyev started Greco-Roman wrestling in his hometown of Kirovo-Chepetsk under the direction of Paul Vertunova. In 1996, he enrolled in the Kuban State University of Physical Education and moved to Krasnodar, where he began wrestling under the direction of the honored coach of Russia, Igor Ivanov. Patrikeyev became a World Champion as a cadet in 1995 and a World Champion as a junior in 1999.

== Career ==
Patrikeyev became a member of the Russian national Greco-Roman wrestling team in 2000. Two years later, he won a gold medal at the 2002 European Wrestling Championships and a bronze medal at the 2002 World Wrestling Championships.

Patrikeyev won a gold medal at the 2004 European Wrestling Championships. Despite becoming European Champion, Patrikeyev lost in the finals of the Russian Championships against Khasan Baroyev later that year and was not included in the Russian national wrestling team at the 2004 Summer Olympics in Athens. Patrikeyev considered the decision of the coaching staff unfair because Baroyev had long been exempted from participation in international competitions and had the opportunity to conduct targeted training for the Championship of Russia. In connection with this, Patrikeyev had a conflict with the head coach of the Russian national team in Greco-Roman wrestling, Gennady Sapunov, and in 2005, he made the decision to change his Russian citizenship to Armenian. At the same time, Yury continued to live and train in Krasnodar, but later served under the flag of Armenia. He officially left the Russian national team in 2005.

Now a wrestler of Armenia, Patrikeyev won a bronze medal at the 2007 World Wrestling Championships. The following year he won his third gold medal at the 2008 European Wrestling Championships. Patrikeyev competed at the 2008 Summer Olympics in Beijing. He won an Olympic bronze medal. Patrikeyev became the first Olympian to win an Olympic medal for Armenia that wasn't born in Armenia.

Patrikeyev was a member of the Armenian Greco-Roman wrestling team at the 2009 Wrestling World Cup. The Armenian team came in third place. Patrikeyev personally won a silver medal. Patrikeyev became a fourth-time the European Champion at the 2009 European Wrestling Championships, winning yet another gold medal. Patrikeyev returned to his native Russia for the 2010 World Wrestling Championships in Moscow. He won a silver medal at the competition.

Patrikeyev was a member of the Armenian Greco-Roman wrestling team at the 2010 Wrestling World Cup. The Armenian team came in third place. Patrikeyev personally won a gold medal.

Patrikeyev won bronze medals at both the 2011 European Wrestling Championships and 2012 European Wrestling Championships. Patrikeyev qualified for the 2012 Summer Olympics in London by coming in first place at the European Qualification Tournament. In the first round, Patrikeyev defeated Baroyev, but in the next round lost to Bashir Babajanzadeh and was unable to win a medal. He came in eighth place.

== Personal life ==
Patrikeyev has a wife and daughter. He has stated that he considers himself an Armenian as much as a Russian.
