= Dremiel Byers =

American wrestler (born 1974)

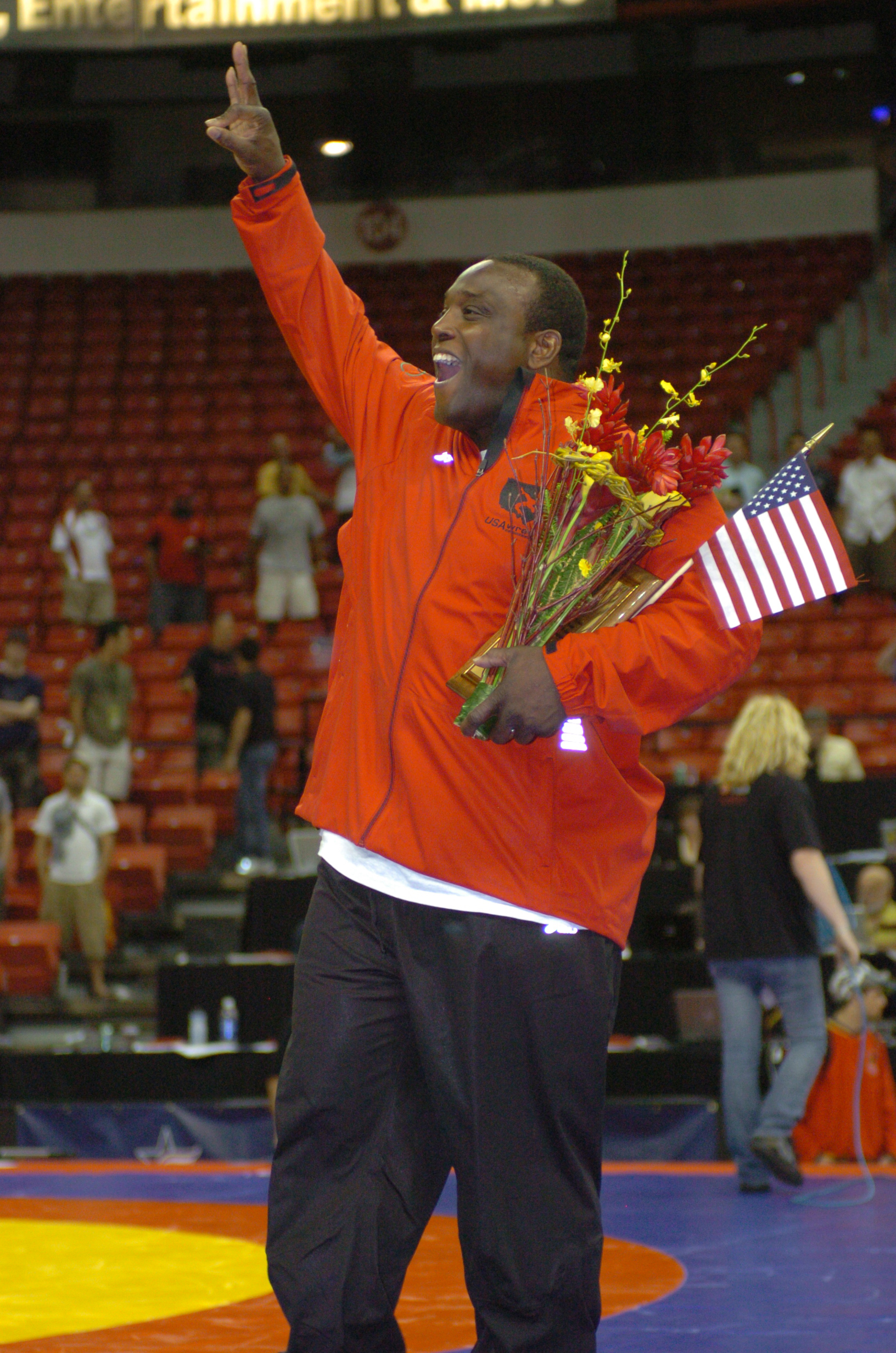
- Sgt. 1st Class Byers celebrates winning a tournament

Personal information
- Full name: Dremiel Deshon Byers
- Born: September 11, 1974 (age 51) Newark, New Jersey, U.S.
- Home town: Kings Mountain, North Carolina, U.S.
- Height: 6 ft 2 in (188 cm)
- Weight: 120 kg (265 lb)

Sport
- Country: United States
- Sport: Wrestling
- Event: Greco-Roman
- Club: U.S. Army WCAP
- Team: USA
- Coached by: Shon Lewis; Steve Fraser
Medal record
Men's Greco-Roman wrestling
Representing the United States
World Championships
Gold medal – first place	2002 Moscow	120 kg
Silver medal – second place	2009 Herning	120 kg
Bronze medal – third place	2007 Baku	120 kg
World Military Championships
Gold medal – first place	2005 Vilnius	120 kg
Pan American Games
Silver medal – second place	1999 Winnipeg	130 kg
Silver medal – second place	2007 Rio de Janeiro	120 kg
Pan American Championships
Gold medal – first place	2003 Guatemala City	120 kg
Silver medal – second place	2002 Maracaibo	120 kg
Silver medal – second place	2006 Rio de Janeiro	120 kg

Dremiel Deshon Byers (born September 11, 1974) is an American former Greco-Roman wrestler. Byers joined the U.S. Army World Class Athletes Program (WCAP) in 1997 and was the 2002 World Champion in Greco-Roman wrestling at 120 kg. In total, Byers won three World medals and was a two-time Olympian. He was also a member of the 2007 United States Greco-Roman World Champion Team. Byers was inducted into the National Wrestling Hall of Fame as a Distinguished Member in 2021.

== Early life and education ==
Byers was raised by a single mother in Kings Mountain, North Carolina. He carries a childhood nickname, "Bam" or "Big Bam" to the current day. Byers earned this nickname from when he was a toddler, carrying a 1-pound dumbbell as a toy.

He attended Kings Mountain High School, where as a wrestler, he won a North Carolina state championship as a heavyweight in 1993.

Byers attended North Carolina A&T for one year on a football scholarship. He was later forced to leave college to take care of family matters. After leaving college, he signed a 2-year enlistment in the US Army.

== Wrestling career ==
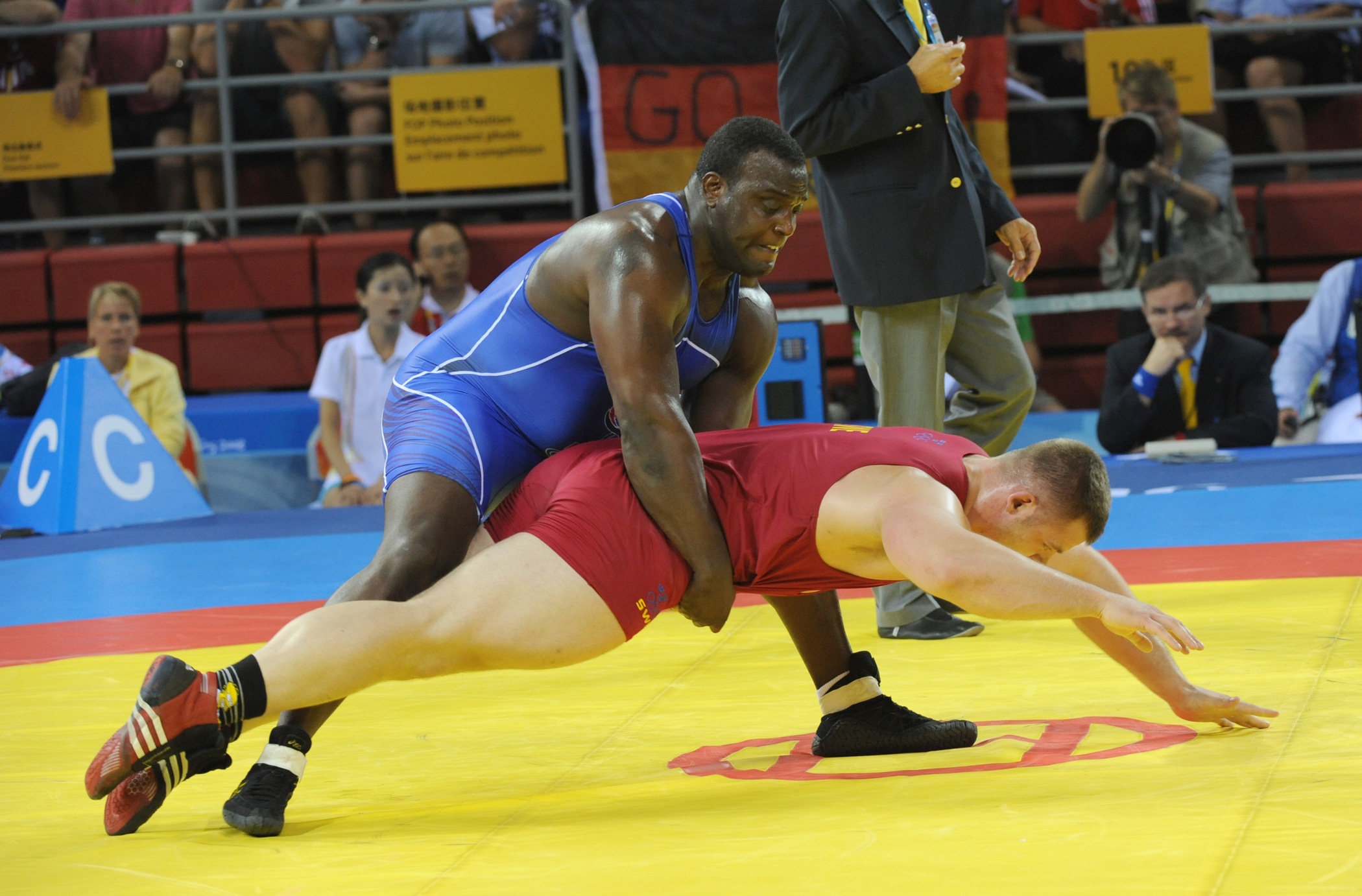
Dremiel Byers (top) lifts Jalmar Sjoberg at the 2008 Summer Olympics.

After joining the US Army, when asked if anyone in his group wrestled before, Byers mentioned how he was a North Carolina state champion. From there, he was introduced to the Greco-Roman style of wrestling and the start of a prolific Greco-Roman wrestling career.

Byers joined the U.S. Army World Class Athlete Program (WCAP) in 1997. He competed out of Colorado Springs, Colorado for the US Army, in the 120 kg (264.5 lbs) weight class. During his career he had many accomplishments and awards as a wrestler. He was recognized as the USA Wrestling Greco-Roman Wrestler of the Year in 1999, 2002 and 2009.

Byers would earn a gold medal in Greco-Roman at the 2002 World Wrestling Championships. He also helped the United States win its first Greco-Roman World team title at the 2007 World Wrestling Championships, with his victory in the bronze medal match clinching the team title. He later also won a silver medal at the 2009 World Wrestling Championships. Byers finished his career tied with Matt Ghaffari for the most Greco-Roman World Championship medals by a United States wrestler, by achieving three medals at the World Championships.

He was inducted into the National Wrestling Hall of Fame Dan Gable Museum’s Alan and Gloria Rice Greco-Roman Hall of Champions in 2015. In 2021, Byers was inducted into the National Wrestling Hall of Fame as a Distinguished Member.

== Personal life ==
Byers is an avid motorcyclist. Byers is a Sergeant First Class in the US Army.
