= Khasan Baroev =

Russian Greco-Roman wrestler (born 1982)

Khasan Baroyev
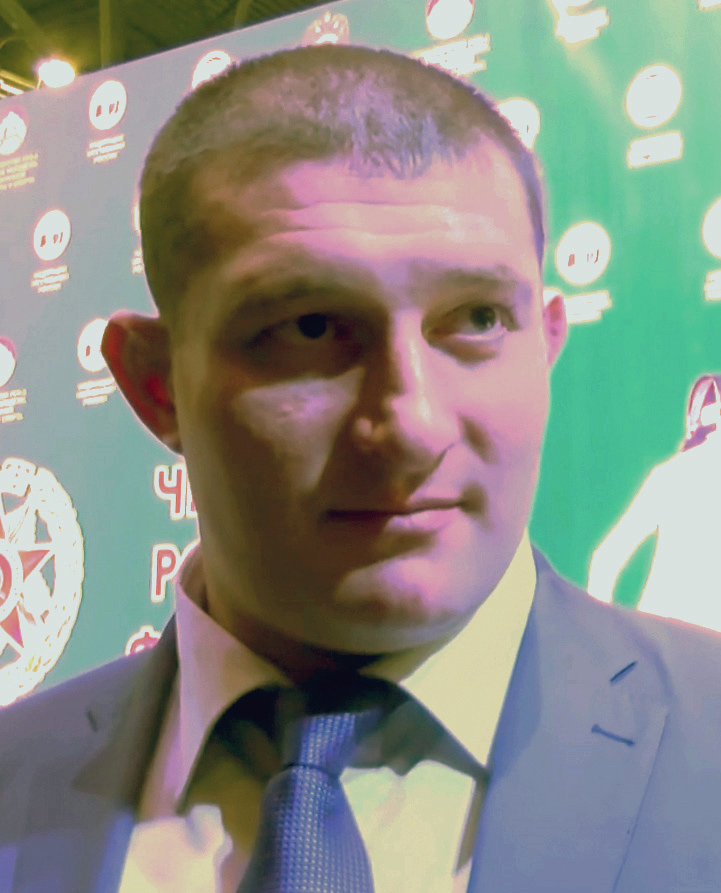

Personal information
- Born: December 1, 1982 (age 43) Dushanbe, Tajik SSR, Soviet Union

Sport
- Sport: Wrestling
- Event: Greco-Roman
Medal record
Men's Greco-Roman wrestling
Representing Russia
Olympic Games
| Gold medal – first place | 2004 Athens | 120 kg |
| Disqualified | 2008 Beijing | 120 kg |
World Championships
| Gold medal – first place | 2003 Créteil | 120 kg |
| Gold medal – first place | 2006 Guangzhou | 120 kg |
| Silver medal – second place | 2007 Baku | 120 kg |
European Championships
| Bronze medal – third place | 2006 Moscow | 120 kg |
| Gold medal – first place | 2007 Sofia | 120 kg |
| Silver medal – second place | 2008 Tampere | 120 kg |
| Gold medal – first place | 2011 Dortmund | 120 kg |

Khasan Makharbekovich Baroyev (Note: Russian: Хасан Махарбекович Бароев, Iron Ossetic: Бæройты Махарбеджы фырт Хасан, Bærojty Maxarbedžy fyrt Xasan) (born December 1, 1982) is a Russian Greco-Roman wrestler of Ossetian origin, who competes in the 120 kg weightclass. He competed in the men's Greco-Roman 120 kg at the 2004 Summer Olympics and won the gold medal. He is also the 2003 and 2006 world champion. At the 2008 Summer Olympics, he was awarded the silver medal, of which he was later stripped for doping. He also competed at the 2012 Summer Olympics.
