= Siarhei Artsiukhin =

Russian-Belarusian wrestler (1976–2012)

Personal information
- Born: 1 November 1976 Moscow, Russia
- Died: 12 September 2012 (aged 35) Moscow, Russia
- Height: 187 cm (6 ft 2 in)
- Weight: 120 kg (265 lb)

Sport
- Sport: Greco-Roman wrestling
- Club: Dynamo Minsk
- Coached by: Evgeny Artyukhin, Sr. Vadim Pankov (1995–2000) Vyacheslav Maksimovich (2000–2009)
Medal record
Representing Belarus
World Championships
Bronze medal – third place	2005 Budapest	-120 kg
Bronze medal – third place	2006 Guangzhou	-120 kg
European Championships
Gold medal – first place	2005 Varna	-120 kg

Sergei Yevgenyevich Artyukhin (Russian: Сергей Евгеньевич Артюхин; 1 November 1976 – 12 September 2012), also known as Siarhei Artsiukhin, was a Russian-Belarusian heavyweight Greco-Roman wrestler. He was born in Moscow and won the 2001 World Cup while representing Russia. After that, to avoid severe competition within Russia, he competed for Belarus and won the European title in 2005 and bronze medals at the world championships in 2005 and 2006. At the 2008 Summer Olympics, he was eliminated in his second bout. He was initially trained by his father, Evgeny Artyukhin, Sr., who was also an international heavyweight Greco-Roman wrestler.

His younger brother, also named Evgeny, is a professional ice hockey player. Sergei retired from wrestling in 2009, and often played recreational ice hockey. He suddenly died of a heart attack after a hockey game, aged 35.
