= 2003 World Wrestling Championships – Men's Greco-Roman 120 kg =

Men's Greco-Roman 120 kg at the 2003 World Championships
- Venue: Palais des Sports Robert Oubron
- Dates: 2–4 October 2003
- Competitors: 33 from 33 nations

Medalists
gold medal	Khasan Baroev	Russia
silver medal	Mihály Deák-Bárdos	Hungary
bronze medal	Georgiy Tsurtsumia	Kazakhstan

The men's Greco-Roman 120 kilograms is a competition featured at the 2003 World Wrestling Championships, and was held at the Palais des Sports Robert Oubron in Créteil, France from 2 to 4 October 2003.

== Results ==
Legend

- F — Won by fall

=== Preliminary round ===
==== Pool 1 ====
Pos	Athlete	Pld	W	L	CP	TP	BUL	POL	BEL
1	Sergei Mureiko (BUL)	2	2	0	7	11	—	3–2	8–0 Fall
2	Andrzej Wroński (POL)	2	1	1	5	6	1–3 PP	—	4–0 Fall
3	Mohcine Khalfi (BEL)	2	0	2	0	0	0–4 TO	0–4 TO	—

Source: Official website

==== Pool 2 ====
Pos	Athlete	Pld	W	L	CP	TP	BLR	IRI	GER
1	Dmitry Debelka (BLR)	2	2	0	6	7	—	4–2	3–0
2	Alireza Gharibi (IRI)	2	1	1	4	5	1–3 PP	—	3–0
3	Nico Schmidt (GER)	2	0	2	0	0	0–3 PO	0–3 PO	—

Source: Official website

==== Pool 3 ====
Pos	Athlete	Pld	W	L	CP	TP	RUS	TUR	KOR
1	Khasan Baroev (RUS)	2	2	0	6	12	—	5–0	7–0
2	Yekta Yılmaz Gül (TUR)	2	1	1	3	3	0–3 PO	—	3–0
3	Park Woo (KOR)	2	0	2	0	0	0–3 PO	0–3 PO	—

Source: Official website

==== Pool 4 ====
Pos	Athlete	Pld	W	L	CP	TP	USA	ISR	SWE
1	Rulon Gardner (USA)	2	2	0	6	9	—	5–2	4–0
2	Yuri Evseichik (ISR)	2	1	1	4	6	1–3 PP	—	4–1
3	Eddy Bengtsson (SWE)	2	0	2	1	1	0–3 PO	1–3 PP	—

Source: Official website

==== Pool 5 ====
Pos	Athlete	Pld	W	L	CP	TP	ARM	KGZ	IND
1	Haykaz Galstyan (ARM)	2	2	0	7	11	—	4–0	7–0 Fall
2	Aleksey Bem (KGZ)	2	1	1	4	5	0–3 PO	—	5–0 Fall
3	Virender Singh (IND)	2	0	2	0	0	0–4 TO	0–4 TO	—

Source: Official website

==== Pool 6 ====
Pos	Athlete	Pld	W	L	CP	TP	KAZ	EST	VEN
1	Georgiy Tsurtsumia (KAZ)	2	2	0	7	17	—	6–0	11–0
2	Helger Hallik (EST)	2	1	1	3	1	0–3 PO	—	1–1
3	Rafael Barreno (VEN)	2	0	2	1	1	0–4 ST	1–3 PP	—

Source: Official website

==== Pool 7 ====
Pos	Athlete	Pld	W	L	CP	TP	GRE	AUS	MKD
1	Xenofon Koutsioumpas (GRE)	2	2	0	8	24	—	10–0	14–0
2	Aaron Stapleton (AUS)	2	1	1	4	0	0–4 ST	—	WO
3	Selajdin Topojani (MKD)	2	0	2	0	0	0–4 ST	0–4 PA	—

Source: Official website

==== Pool 8 ====
Pos	Athlete	Pld	W	L	CP	TP	LTU	UKR	JPN
1	Mindaugas Mizgaitis (LTU)	2	2	0	6	7	—	4–0	3–0
2	Konstantin Stryzhak (UKR)	2	1	1	3	6	0–3 PO	—	6–2
3	Katsuaki Suzuki (JPN)	2	0	2	1	2	0–3 PO	1–3 PP	—

Source: Official website

==== Pool 9 ====
Pos	Athlete	Pld	W	L	CP	TP	FRA	CHN	NOR
1	Yannick Szczepaniak (FRA)	2	2	0	6	9	—	3–1	6–0
2	Ren Li (CHN)	2	1	1	4	4	1–3 PP	—	3–0
3	Roe Kleive (NOR)	2	0	2	0	0	0–3 PO	0–3 PO	—

Source: Official website

==== Pool 10 ====
Pos	Athlete	Pld	W	L	CP	TP	FIN	CUB	GEO
1	Juha Ahokas (FIN)	2	2	0	6	7	—	4–2	3–2
2	Mijaín López (CUB)	2	1	1	4	5	1–3 PP	—	3–1
3	Mirian Giorgadze (GEO)	2	0	2	2	3	1–3 PP	1–3 PP	—

Source: Official website

==== Pool 11 ====
Pos	Athlete	Pld	W	L	CP	TP	HUN	CZE	ITA
1	Mihály Deák-Bárdos (HUN)	2	2	0	6	6	—	3–0	3–0
2	David Vála (CZE)	2	1	1	3	4	0–3 PO	—	4–0
3	Giuseppe Giunta (ITA)	2	0	2	0	0	0–3 PO	0–3 PO	—

Source: Official website

=== Knockout round ===
Round of 16
Sergei Mureiko (BUL)	3
Dmitry Debelka (BLR)	0
Khasan Baroev (RUS)	3
Rulon Gardner (USA)	0
Haykaz Galstyan (ARM)	2
Georgiy Tsurtsumia (KAZ)	9^{F}

Quarterfinals
Sergei Mureiko (BUL)	1
Khasan Baroev (RUS)	3
Georgiy Tsurtsumia (KAZ)	3
Xenofon Koutsioumpas (GRE)	2
Mindaugas Mizgaitis (LTU)	3
Yannick Szczepaniak (FRA)	1
Juha Ahokas (FIN)	1
Mihály Deák-Bárdos (HUN)	4

Semifinals
Khasan Baroev (RUS)	4
Georgiy Tsurtsumia (KAZ)	2
Mindaugas Mizgaitis (LTU)	0
Mihály Deák-Bárdos (HUN)	3

Final
Khasan Baroev (RUS)	3
Mihály Deák-Bárdos (HUN)	1
Bronze medal match
Georgiy Tsurtsumia (KAZ)	4
Mindaugas Mizgaitis (LTU)	0
