= 1999 World Wrestling Championships – Men's Greco-Roman 130 kg =

Men's Greco-Roman 130 kg at the 1999 World Championships
- Venue: Peace and Friendship Stadium
- Dates: 24–26 September 1999
- Competitors: 27 from 27 nations

Medalists
gold medal	Aleksandr Karelin	Russia
silver medal	Héctor Milián	Cuba
bronze medal	Sergei Mureiko	Bulgaria

The men's Greco-Roman 130 kilograms is a competition featured at the 1999 World Wrestling Championships, and was held at the Peace and Friendship Stadium in Piraeus, Athens, Greece from 24 to 26 September 1999.

== Results ==
Legend

- C — Won by 3 cautions given to the opponent
- F — Won by fall

=== Preliminary round ===
==== Pool 1 ====
Pos	Athlete	Pld	W	L	CP	TP	GRE	IRI	CZE
1	Anastasios Sofianidis (GRE)	2	2	0	6	3	—	2–0	1–0
2	Mohammad Sharabiani (IRI)	2	1	1	3	3	0–3 PO	—	3–0
3	David Vála (CZE)	2	0	2	0	0	0–3 PO	0–3 PO	—

Source: Official website

==== Pool 2 ====
Pos	Athlete	Pld	W	L	CP	TP	USA	HUN	ROM
1	Dremiel Byers (USA)	2	2	0	6	8	—	4–1	4–0
2	Mihály Deák-Bárdos (HUN)	2	1	1	5	11	1–3 PP	—	10–0
3	Ion Ţicală (ROM)	2	0	2	0	0	0–3 PO	0–4 ST	—

Source: Official website

==== Pool 3 ====
Pos	Athlete	Pld	W	L	CP	TP	GEO	KOR	GER
1	Davit Endeladze (GEO)	2	2	0	8	8	—	4–0 Fall	4–2 Fall
2	Yang Young-jin (KOR)	2	1	1	3	1	0–4 TO	—	1–1
3	Raymund Edfelder (GER)	2	0	2	1	3	0–4 TO	1–3 PP	—

Source: Official website

==== Pool 4 ====
Pos	Athlete	Pld	W	L	CP	TP	BUL	ISR	MDA
1	Sergei Mureiko (BUL)	2	2	0	7	14	—	2–1	12–0
2	Yuri Evseichik (ISR)	2	1	1	5	12	1–3 PP	—	11–0
3	Anatoli Ciumac (MDA)	2	0	2	0	0	0–4 ST	0–4 ST	—

Source: Official website

==== Pool 5 ====
Pos	Athlete	Pld	W	L	CP	TP	UKR	BLR	JPN
1	Georgiy Saldadze (UKR)	2	2	0	7	14	—	3–2	11–1
2	Dmitry Debelka (BLR)	2	1	1	4	8	1–3 PP	—	6–2
3	Katsuaki Suzuki (JPN)	2	0	2	2	3	1–4 SP	1–3 PP	—

Source: Official website

==== Pool 6 ====
Pos	Athlete	Pld	W	L	CP	TP	TUR	EST	POL
1	Fatih Bakır (TUR)	2	2	0	6	6	—	3–1	3–0
2	Helger Hallik (EST)	2	0	2	1	1	1–3 PP	—	0–0 DQ
3	Jacek Fafiński (POL)	2	0	2	0	0	0–3 PO	0–0 E2	—

Source: Official website

==== Pool 7 ====
Pos	Athlete	Pld	W	L	CP	TP	RUS	ITA	LTU
1	Aleksandr Karelin (RUS)	2	2	0	8	10	—	WO	10–0
2	Giuseppe Giunta (ITA)	2	1	1	3	4	0–4 PA	—	4–0
3	Mindaugas Mizgaitis (LTU)	2	0	2	0	0	0–4 ST	0–3 PO	—

Source: Official website

==== Pool 8 ====
Pos	Athlete	Pld	W	L	CP	TP	SWE	ARM	AUS
1	Eddy Bengtsson (SWE)	2	2	0	8	14	—	4–0 Fall	10–0
2	Haykaz Galstyan (ARM)	2	1	1	3	4	0–4 TO	—	4–0
3	Laszlo Kovacs (AUS)	2	0	2	0	0	0–4 ST	0–3 PO	—

Source: Official website

==== Pool 9 ====
Pos	Athlete	Pld	W	L	CP	TP	CUB	CHN	AZE
1	Héctor Milián (CUB)	2	2	0	6	9	—	6–0	3–0
2	Zhao Hailin (CHN)	2	1	1	5	5	0–3 PO	—	5–4
3	Azar Aliyev (AZE)	2	0	2	1	4	0–3 PO	1–3 PP	—

Source: Official website

=== Knockout round ===
Round of 16
Anastasios Sofianidis (GRE)	0
Dremiel Byers (USA)	2
Davit Endeladze (GEO)	0
Sergei Mureiko (BUL)	4^{F}
Georgiy Saldadze (UKR)	3
Fatih Bakır (TUR)	0
Aleksandr Karelin (RUS)	9^{F}
Eddy Bengtsson (SWE)	0
Héctor Milián (CUB)	5
Mohammad Sharabiani (IRI)	0
Mihály Deák-Bárdos (HUN)	3^{C}
Yuri Evseichik (ISR)	2
Dmitry Debelka (BLR)	0
Giuseppe Giunta (ITA)	2
Haykaz Galstyan (ARM)	7
Zhao Hailin (CHN)	2

Quarterfinals
Dremiel Byers (USA)	1
Sergei Mureiko (BUL)	1
Georgiy Saldadze (UKR)	1
Aleksandr Karelin (RUS)	5
Héctor Milián (CUB)	4
Mihály Deák-Bárdos (HUN)	0
Giuseppe Giunta (ITA)	2
Haykaz Galstyan (ARM)	0

Semifinals
Sergei Mureiko (BUL)	0
Aleksandr Karelin (RUS)	2
Héctor Milián (CUB)	3
Giuseppe Giunta (ITA)	0

Final
Aleksandr Karelin (RUS)	3
Héctor Milián (CUB)	0
Bronze medal match
Sergei Mureiko (BUL)	3
Giuseppe Giunta (ITA)	0
