= 1998 World Wrestling Championships – Men's Greco-Roman 130 kg =

Men's Greco-Roman 130 kg at the 1998 World Championships
- Venue: Gavlerinken
- Dates: 28–30 August 1998
- Competitors: 25 from 25 nations

Medalists
gold medal	Aleksandr Karelin	Russia
silver medal	Matt Ghaffari	United States
bronze medal	Yuri Evseichik	Israel

The men's Greco-Roman 130 kilograms is a competition featured at the 1998 World Wrestling Championships, and was held at the Gavlerinken in Gävle, Sweden from 28 to 30 August 1998.

== Results ==
Legend

- 3C — Won by 3 cautions given to the opponent
- WO — Won by walkover

=== Round 1 ===
	Score	
Round of 32
Shermukhammad Kuziev (UZB)	1–5	Georgiy Saldadze (UKR)
Anatoly Fedorenko (BLR)	2–0	Mirian Giorgadze (GEO)
Sergei Mureiko (BUL)	3–0	Anastasios Sofianidis (GRE)
Jacek Fafiński (POL)	2–0	Helger Hallik (EST)
Héctor Milián (CUB)	0–0	Şaban Donat (TUR)
Omrane Ayari (TUN)	0–6	Mihály Deák-Bárdos (HUN)
Eddy Bengtsson (SWE)	3–0	Adil Karibov (KAZ)
Matt Ghaffari (USA)	8–0	Vassil Hristov (ESP)
Mario Miketek (CRO)	0–5	Raymund Edfelder (GER)
Yang Young-jin (KOR)	0–3	Yuri Evseichik (ISR)
Aleksandr Karelin (RUS)	3–0 Fall	Juha Ahokas (FIN)
Mehdi Sabzali (IRI)	0–3	Zhao Hailin (CHN)
Minoru Hamaue (JPN)		Bye

=== Round 2 ===
	Score	
Round of 16
Minoru Hamaue (JPN)	0–7	Georgiy Saldadze (UKR)
Anatoly Fedorenko (BLR)	0–3	Sergei Mureiko (BUL)
Jacek Fafiński (POL)	0–3	Héctor Milián (CUB)
Mihály Deák-Bárdos (HUN)	5–0	Eddy Bengtsson (SWE)
Matt Ghaffari (USA)	1–0	Raymund Edfelder (GER)
Yuri Evseichik (ISR)	0–8	Aleksandr Karelin (RUS)
Zhao Hailin (CHN)		Bye
Repechage
Shermukhammad Kuziev (UZB)	0–7 3C	Mirian Giorgadze (GEO)
Anastasios Sofianidis (GRE)	2–1	Helger Hallik (EST)
Şaban Donat (TUR)	4–0	Omrane Ayari (TUN)
Adil Karibov (KAZ)	11–3	Vassil Hristov (ESP)
Mario Miketek (CRO)	0–3	Yang Young-jin (KOR)
Juha Ahokas (FIN)	1–3	Mehdi Sabzali (IRI)

=== Round 3 ===
	Score	
Quarterfinals
Zhao Hailin (CHN)	0–6 Fall	Georgiy Saldadze (UKR)
Sergei Mureiko (BUL)	1–1	Héctor Milián (CUB)
Mihály Deák-Bárdos (HUN)	0–0	Matt Ghaffari (USA)
Aleksandr Karelin (RUS)		Bye
Repechage
Mirian Giorgadze (GEO)	3–0	Anastasios Sofianidis (GRE)
Şaban Donat (TUR)	3–0	Adil Karibov (KAZ)
Yang Young-jin (KOR)	1–3	Mehdi Sabzali (IRI)
Minoru Hamaue (JPN)	0–11	Anatoly Fedorenko (BLR)
Jacek Fafiński (POL)	1–0	Eddy Bengtsson (SWE)
Raymund Edfelder (GER)	0–4	Yuri Evseichik (ISR)

=== Round 4 ===
	Score	
Repechage
Mirian Giorgadze (GEO)	3–0	Şaban Donat (TUR)
Mehdi Sabzali (IRI)	1–3	Anatoly Fedorenko (BLR)
Jacek Fafiński (POL)	2–3	Yuri Evseichik (ISR)
Zhao Hailin (CHN)	0–2	Héctor Milián (CUB)
Mihály Deák-Bárdos (HUN)		Bye

=== Round 5 ===
	Score	
Semifinals
Aleksandr Karelin (RUS)	4–0	Georgiy Saldadze (UKR)
Sergei Mureiko (BUL)	1–3	Matt Ghaffari (USA)
Repechage
Mihály Deák-Bárdos (HUN)	0–4	Mirian Giorgadze (GEO)
Anatoly Fedorenko (BLR)	1–3	Yuri Evseichik (ISR)
Héctor Milián (CUB)		Bye

=== Round 6 ===
	Score	
Repechage
Héctor Milián (CUB)	1–4	Mirian Giorgadze (GEO)
Yuri Evseichik (ISR)		Bye

=== Round 7 ===
	Score	
Repechage
Georgiy Saldadze (UKR)	2–4	Yuri Evseichik (ISR)
Mirian Giorgadze (GEO)	WO	Sergei Mureiko (BUL)

=== Finals ===
	Score	
Bronze medal match
Yuri Evseichik (ISR)	6–0	Mirian Giorgadze (GEO)
Final
Aleksandr Karelin (RUS)	7–0 Fall	Matt Ghaffari (USA)
