= 2001 World Wrestling Championships – Men's Greco-Roman 130 kg =

Men's Greco-Roman 130 kg at the 2001 World Championships
- Venue: Dimitris Tofalos Arena
- Dates: 7–9 December 2001
- Competitors: 24 from 24 nations

Medalists
gold medal	Rulon Gardner	United States
silver medal	Mihály Deák-Bárdos	Hungary
bronze medal	Xenofon Koutsioumpas	Greece

The men's Greco-Roman 130 kilograms is a competition featured at the 2001 World Wrestling Championships, and was held at the Dimitris Tofalos Arena in Patras, Greece from 7 to 9 December 2001.

== Results ==
Legend

- F — Won by fall

=== Preliminary round ===
==== Pool 1 ====
Pos	Athlete	Pld	W	L	CP	TP	CUB	CZE	KAZ
1	Mijaín López (CUB)	2	2	0	6	7	—	4–0	3–1
2	David Vála (CZE)	2	1	1	4	3	0–3 PO	—	3–0 Fall
3	Yerlan Oskeyev (KAZ)	2	0	2	1	1	1–3 PP	0–4 TO	—

Source: Japan Wrestling

==== Pool 2 ====
Pos	Athlete	Pld	W	L	CP	TP	GRE	TUR	EST
1	Xenofon Koutsioumpas (GRE)	2	2	0	7	10	—	3–0 Fall	7–3
2	Fatih Bakır (TUR)	2	1	1	3	3	0–4 TO	—	3–0
3	Helger Hallik (EST)	2	0	2	1	3	1–3 PP	0–3 PO	—

Source: Japan Wrestling

==== Pool 3 ====
Pos	Athlete	Pld	W	L	CP	TP	HUN	IRI	KOR
1	Mihály Deák-Bárdos (HUN)	2	2	0	6	6	—	3–0	3–0
2	Alireza Gharibi (IRI)	2	1	1	4	8	0–3 PO	—	8–0 Fall
3	Yang Young-jin (KOR)	2	0	2	0	0	0–3 PO	0–4 TO	—

Source: Japan Wrestling

==== Pool 4 ====
Pos	Athlete	Pld	W	L	CP	TP	SWE	UZB	NOR
1	Eddy Bengtsson (SWE)	2	2	0	7	16	—	6–1	10–0
2	Shermukhammad Kuziev (UZB)	2	1	1	4	5	1–3 PP	—	4–2
3	Roe Kleive (NOR)	2	0	2	1	2	0–4 ST	1–3 PP	—

Source: Japan Wrestling

==== Pool 5 ====
Pos	Athlete	Pld	W	L	CP	TP	USA	UKR	ISR
1	Rulon Gardner (USA)	2	2	0	6	6	—	3–0	3–0
2	Georgiy Saldadze (UKR)	2	1	1	3	3	0–3 PO	—	3–1
3	Yuri Evseichik (ISR)	2	0	2	1	1	0–3 PO	1–3 PP	—

Source: Japan Wrestling

==== Pool 6 ====
Pos	Athlete	Pld	W	L	CP	TP	RUS	CHN	IND
1	Yury Patrikeyev (RUS)	2	2	0	7	22	—	13–0	9–0
2	Song Jidong (CHN)	2	1	1	4	11	0–4 ST	—	11–0
3	Yogesh Dodke (IND)	2	0	2	0	0	0–3 PO	0–4 ST	—

Source: Japan Wrestling

==== Pool 7 ====
Pos	Athlete	Pld	W	L	CP	TP	BUL	FIN	GER
1	Sergei Mureiko (BUL)	2	2	0	6	9	—	5–0	4–0
2	Juha Ahokas (FIN)	2	1	1	3	5	0–3 PO	—	5–0
3	Nico Schmidt (GER)	2	0	2	0	0	0–3 PO	0–3 PO	—

Source: Japan Wrestling

==== Pool 8 ====
Pos	Athlete	Pld	W	L	CP	TP	GEO	BLR	POL
1	Georgiy Tsurtsumia (GEO)	2	2	0	6	8	—	4–1	4–0
2	Dmitry Debelka (BLR)	2	1	1	4	4	1–3 PP	—	3–0
3	Jacek Jaracz (POL)	2	0	2	0	0	0–3 PO	0–3 PO	—

Source: Japan Wrestling

=== Knockout round ===
Quarterfinals
Mijaín López (CUB)	1
Xenofon Koutsioumpas (GRE)	6
Mihály Deák-Bárdos (HUN)	3
Eddy Bengtsson (SWE)	1
Rulon Gardner (USA)	4^{F}
Yury Patrikeyev (RUS)	3
Sergei Mureiko (BUL)	4
Georgiy Tsurtsumia (GEO)	4

Semifinals
Xenofon Koutsioumpas (GRE)	0
Mihály Deák-Bárdos (HUN)	4^{F}
Rulon Gardner (USA)	3
Sergei Mureiko (BUL)	0

Final
Mihály Deák-Bárdos (HUN)	0
Rulon Gardner (USA)	2
Bronze medal match
Xenofon Koutsioumpas (GRE)	8
Sergei Mureiko (BUL)	0
