= 2002 World Wrestling Championships – Men's Greco-Roman 120 kg =

Men's Greco-Roman 120 kg at the 2002 World Championships
- Venue: Universal Sports Hall CSKA
- Dates: 21–22 September 2002
- Competitors: 25 from 25 nations

Medalists
gold medal	Dremiel Byers	United States
silver medal	Mihály Deák-Bárdos	Hungary
bronze medal	Yury Patrikeyev	Russia

The men's Greco-Roman 120 kilograms is a competition featured at the 2002 World Wrestling Championships, and was held at the Universal Sports Hall CSKA in Moscow, Russia from 21 to 22 September 2002.

== Results ==
=== Preliminary round ===
==== Pool 1 ====
Pos	Athlete	Pld	W	L	CP	TP	HUN	FIN	KOR
1	Mihály Deák-Bárdos (HUN)	2	2	0	6	12	—	3–0	9–2
2	Juha Ahokas (FIN)	2	1	1	3	7	0–3 PO	—	7–3
3	Park Woo (KOR)	2	0	2	2	5	1–3 PP	1–3 PP	—

Source: Official website

==== Pool 2 ====
Pos	Athlete	Pld	W	L	CP	TP	KAZ	POL	IRI
1	Georgiy Tsurtsumia (KAZ)	2	2	0	6	6	—	3–0	3–0
2	Jacek Fafiński (POL)	2	1	1	4	6	0–3 PO	—	6–1 Fall
3	Payam Zarinpour (IRI)	2	0	2	0	1	0–3 PO	0–4 TO	—

Source: Official website

==== Pool 3 ====
Pos	Athlete	Pld	W	L	CP	TP	RUS	CUB	BUL
1	Yury Patrikeyev (RUS)	2	2	0	6	8	—	4–0	4–0
2	Mijaín López (CUB)	2	1	1	4	4	0–3 PO	—	4–0 Ret
3	Sergei Mureiko (BUL)	2	0	2	0	0	0–3 PO	0–4 PA	—

Source: Official website

==== Pool 4 ====
Pos	Athlete	Pld	W	L	CP	TP	ITA	GER	UKR
1	Giuseppe Giunta (ITA)	2	2	0	6	5	—	3–1	2–2
2	Nico Schmidt (GER)	2	1	1	5	1	1–3 PP	—	WO
3	Georgiy Saldadze (UKR)	2	0	2	1	2	1–3 PP	0–4 PA	—

Source: Official website

==== Pool 5 ====
Pos	Athlete	Pld	W	L	CP	TP	ISR	SWE	UZB
1	Yuri Evseichik (ISR)	2	2	0	6	8	—	3–0	5–0
2	Eddy Bengtsson (SWE)	2	1	1	3	3	0–3 PO	—	3–0
3	Shermukhammad Kuziev (UZB)	2	0	2	0	0	0–3 PO	0–3 PO	—

Source: Official website

==== Pool 6 ====
Pos	Athlete	Pld	W	L	CP	TP	USA	BLR	CHN
1	Dremiel Byers (USA)	2	2	0	8	12	—	4–0 Fall	8–0 Fall
2	Dmitry Debelka (BLR)	2	1	1	3	3	0–4 TO	—	3–0
3	Song Jidong (CHN)	2	0	2	0	0	0–4 TO	0–3 PO	—

Source: Official website

==== Pool 7 ====
Pos	Athlete	Pld	W	L	CP	TP	GRE	TUR	LTU
1	Xenofon Koutsioumpas (GRE)	2	2	0	7	10	—	7–2	3–0 Fall
2	Yekta Yılmaz Gül (TUR)	2	1	1	4	6	1–3 PP	—	4–2
3	Mindaugas Mizgaitis (LTU)	2	0	2	1	2	0–4 TO	1–3 PP	—

Source: Official website

==== Pool 8 ====
Pos	Athlete	Pld	W	L	CP	TP	EST	NOR	CRO	MRI
1	Helger Hallik (EST)	3	3	0	10	12	—	3–0	5–0	4–0 Fall
2	Roe Kleive (NOR)	3	2	1	8	3	0–3 PO	—	3–0 Fall	WO
3	Josip Matković (CRO)	3	1	2	4	0	0–3 PO	0–4 TO	—	WO
4	François-Xavier André (MRI)	3	0	3	0	0	0–4 TO	0–4 EF	0–4 EF	—

Source: Official website

=== Knockout round ===
Quarterfinals
Mihály Deák-Bárdos (HUN)	4
Georgiy Tsurtsumia (KAZ)	0
Yury Patrikeyev (RUS)	9
Giuseppe Giunta (ITA)	0
Yuri Evseichik (ISR)	1
Dremiel Byers (USA)	3
Xenofon Koutsioumpas (GRE)	4
Helger Hallik (EST)	2

Semifinals
Mihály Deák-Bárdos (HUN)	2
Yury Patrikeyev (RUS)	1
Dremiel Byers (USA)	4
Xenofon Koutsioumpas (GRE)	1

Final
Mihály Deák-Bárdos (HUN)	0
Dremiel Byers (USA)	3
Bronze medal match
Yury Patrikeyev (RUS)	9
Xenofon Koutsioumpas (GRE)	4
