= 1997 World Wrestling Championships – Men's Greco-Roman 130 kg =

Men's Greco-Roman 130 kg at the 1997 World Championships
- Venue: Hala Ludowa
- Dates: 11–13 September 1997
- Competitors: 25 from 25 nations

Medalists
gold medal	Aleksandr Karelin	Russia
silver medal	Mihály Deák-Bárdos	Hungary
bronze medal	Héctor Milián	Cuba

The men's Greco-Roman 130 kilograms is a competition featured at the 1997 World Wrestling Championships, and was held in Wrocław, Poland from 11 to 13 September 1997.

== Results ==
Legend

- 3C — Won by 3 cautions given to the opponent

=== Round 1 ===
	Score	
Round of 32
Yang Young-jin (KOR)	2–1	Parviz Kianifard (SWE)
Haykaz Galstyan (ARM)	0–4	Anastasios Sofianidis (GRE)
Sergey Silich (BLR)	3–0	Minoru Hamaue (JPN)
Mihály Deák-Bárdos (HUN)	5–0	Yuan Damao (CHN)
Sergei Fjodorov (EST)	0–0	Raoul Dgvareli (TJK)
Raymund Edfelder (GER)	3–2	Jacek Jaracz (POL)
Juha Ahokas (FIN)	6–0	Mario Miketek (CRO)
Petro Kotok (UKR)	1–0	Héctor Milián (CUB)
Gintaras Bukauskas (LTU)	0–5 Fall	Mirian Giorgadze (GEO)
Rafael Barreno (VEN)	0–4 Fall	Şaban Donat (TUR)
Rulon Gardner (USA)	3–0 3C	David Vála (CZE)
Sergei Mureiko (BUL)	11–0	Shermukhammad Kuziev (UZB)
Aleksandr Karelin (RUS)		Bye

=== Round 2 ===
	Score	
Round of 16
Aleksandr Karelin (RUS)	6–0 Fall	Yang Young-jin (KOR)
Anastasios Sofianidis (GRE)	0–0	Sergey Silich (BLR)
Mihály Deák-Bárdos (HUN)	1–0	Sergei Fjodorov (EST)
Raymund Edfelder (GER)	2–2	Juha Ahokas (FIN)
Petro Kotok (UKR)	5–0	Mirian Giorgadze (GEO)
Şaban Donat (TUR)	0–2	Rulon Gardner (USA)
Sergei Mureiko (BUL)		Bye
Repechage
Parviz Kianifard (SWE)	5–0	Haykaz Galstyan (ARM)
Minoru Hamaue (JPN)	0–3	Yuan Damao (CHN)
Raoul Dgvareli (TJK)	0–3	Jacek Jaracz (POL)
Mario Miketek (CRO)	0–4	Héctor Milián (CUB)
Gintaras Bukauskas (LTU)	2–1	Rafael Barreno (VEN)
David Vála (CZE)	0–3	Shermukhammad Kuziev (UZB)

=== Round 3 ===
	Score	
Quarterfinals
Sergei Mureiko (BUL)	0–2	Aleksandr Karelin (RUS)
Sergey Silich (BLR)	0–2	Mihály Deák-Bárdos (HUN)
Raymund Edfelder (GER)	0–4	Petro Kotok (UKR)
Rulon Gardner (USA)		Bye
Repechage
Parviz Kianifard (SWE)	5–0	Yuan Damao (CHN)
Jacek Jaracz (POL)	0–5	Héctor Milián (CUB)
Gintaras Bukauskas (LTU)	0–10	Shermukhammad Kuziev (UZB)
Yang Young-jin (KOR)	3–0	Anastasios Sofianidis (GRE)
Sergei Fjodorov (EST)	0–10	Juha Ahokas (FIN)
Mirian Giorgadze (GEO)	0–2	Şaban Donat (TUR)

=== Round 4 ===
	Score	
Repechage
Parviz Kianifard (SWE)	0–3	Héctor Milián (CUB)
Shermukhammad Kuziev (UZB)	4–6	Yang Young-jin (KOR)
Juha Ahokas (FIN)	3–1	Şaban Donat (TUR)
Sergei Mureiko (BUL)	4–1	Sergey Silich (BLR)
Raymund Edfelder (GER)		Bye

=== Round 5 ===
	Score	
Semifinals
Rulon Gardner (USA)	0–6	Aleksandr Karelin (RUS)
Mihály Deák-Bárdos (HUN)	1–0	Petro Kotok (UKR)
Repechage
Raymund Edfelder (GER)	0–3	Héctor Milián (CUB)
Yang Young-jin (KOR)	0–4 Fall	Sergei Mureiko (BUL)
Juha Ahokas (FIN)		Bye

=== Round 6 ===
	Score	
Repechage
Juha Ahokas (FIN)	0–5	Sergei Mureiko (BUL)
Héctor Milián (CUB)		Bye

=== Round 7 ===
	Score	
Repechage
Rulon Gardner (USA)	0–2	Héctor Milián (CUB)
Sergei Mureiko (BUL)	5–0	Petro Kotok (UKR)

=== Finals ===
	Score	
5th place match
Rulon Gardner (USA)	0–0	Petro Kotok (UKR)
Bronze medal match
Héctor Milián (CUB)	3–0	Sergei Mureiko (BUL)
Final
Aleksandr Karelin (RUS)	13–0	Mihály Deák-Bárdos (HUN)
