= Wrestling at the 2000 Summer Olympics – Men's Greco-Roman 130 kg =

Men's Greco-Roman 130 kg at the Games of the XXVII Olympiad
- Venue: Sydney Convention and Exhibition Centre
- Date: 25–27 September 2000
- Competitors: 20 from 20 nations

Medalists
1st place, gold medalist(s)		Rulon Gardner	United States
2nd place, silver medalist(s)		Aleksandr Karelin	Russia
3rd place, bronze medalist(s)		Dmitry Debelka	Belarus

The men's Greco-Roman 130 kilograms at the 2000 Summer Olympics as part of the wrestling program was held at the Sydney Convention and Exhibition Centre from September 25 to 27. The competition held with an elimination system of three or four wrestlers in each pool, with the winners qualify for the quarterfinals, semifinals and final by way of direct elimination.

American Rulon Gardner's defeat of Russian Aleksandr Karelin in the gold medal match is considered one of the biggest upsets in sports history. This was Karelin's first and only international loss, having previously been unbeaten throughout his international career.

== Schedule ==
All times are Australian Eastern Daylight Time (UTC+11:00)

Date	Time	Event
25 September 2000	09:30	Round 1
25 September 2000	17:00	Round 2
26 September 2000	09:30	Round 3
27 September 2000	09:30	Quarterfinals
27 September 2000	09:30	Semifinals
27 September 2000	17:00	Finals

== Results ==
Legend

- WO — Won by walkover

=== Elimination pools ===
==== Pool 1 ====
Pos	Athlete	Pld	W	L	CP	TP	Qualification
1	Héctor Milián (CUB)	2	2	0	6	4	Knockout round
2	Zhao Hailin (CHN)	2	1	1	3	3	
3	Helger Hallik (EST)	2	0	2	1	2	

Source: Official Report

	Score		CP
Héctor Milián (CUB)	3–0	Helger Hallik (EST)	3–0 PO
Zhao Hailin (CHN)	0–1	Héctor Milián (CUB)	0–3 PO
Helger Hallik (EST)	2–3	Zhao Hailin (CHN)	1–3 PP

==== Pool 2 ====
Pos	Athlete	Pld	W	L	CP	TP	Qualification
1	Dmitry Debelka (BLR)	2	2	0	6	5	Knockout round
2	Eddy Bengtsson (SWE)	2	1	1	4	5	
3	Mirian Giorgadze (GEO)	2	0	2	0	0	

Source: Official Report

	Score		CP
Mirian Giorgadze (GEO)	0–3	Dmitry Debelka (BLR)	0–3 PO
Eddy Bengtsson (SWE)	4–0	Mirian Giorgadze (GEO)	3–0 PO
Dmitry Debelka (BLR)	2–1	Eddy Bengtsson (SWE)	3–1 PP

==== Pool 3 ====
Pos	Athlete	Pld	W	L	CP	TP	Qualification
1	Georgiy Saldadze (UKR)	2	2	0	7	15	Knockout round
2	Rafael Barreno (VEN)	2	1	1	3	4	
3	Laszlo Kovacs (AUS)	2	0	2	0	0	

Source: Official Report

	Score		CP
Rafael Barreno (VEN)	0–9	Georgiy Saldadze (UKR)	0–3 PO
Laszlo Kovacs (AUS)	0–4	Rafael Barreno (VEN)	0–3 PO
Georgiy Saldadze (UKR)	6–0 Fall	Laszlo Kovacs (AUS)	4–0 TO

==== Pool 4 ====
Pos	Athlete	Pld	W	L	CP	TP	Qualification
1	Aleksandr Karelin (RUS)	2	2	0	7	6	Knockout round
2	Mihály Deák-Bárdos (HUN)	2	1	1	4	0	
3	Sergei Mureiko (BUL)	2	0	2	0	0	

Source: Official Report

	Score		CP
Aleksandr Karelin (RUS)	3–0	Sergei Mureiko (BUL)	3–0 PO
Mihály Deák-Bárdos (HUN)	0–3 Fall	Aleksandr Karelin (RUS)	0–4 TO
Sergei Mureiko (BUL)	WO	Mihály Deák-Bárdos (HUN)	0–4 PA

==== Pool 5 ====
Pos	Athlete	Pld	W	L	CP	TP	Qualification
1	Rulon Gardner (USA)	3	3	0	9	15	Knockout round
2	Giuseppe Giunta (ITA)	3	2	1	7	6	
3	Haykaz Galstyan (ARM)	3	1	2	3	3	
4	Omrane Ayari (TUN)	3	0	3	2	4	

Source: Official Report

	Score		CP
Haykaz Galstyan (ARM)	0–1	Giuseppe Giunta (ITA)	0–3 PO
Rulon Gardner (USA)	7–2	Omrane Ayari (TUN)	3–1 PP
Haykaz Galstyan (ARM)	0–6	Rulon Gardner (USA)	0–3 PO
Giuseppe Giunta (ITA)	4–0	Omrane Ayari (TUN)	3–0 PO
Haykaz Galstyan (ARM)	3–2	Omrane Ayari (TUN)	3–1 PP
Giuseppe Giunta (ITA)	1–2	Rulon Gardner (USA)	1–3 PP

==== Pool 6 ====
Pos	Athlete	Pld	W	L	CP	TP	Qualification
1	Yuri Evseichik (ISR)	3	3	0	9	11	Knockout round
2	Fatih Bakır (TUR)	3	2	1	6	4	
3	David Vála (CZE)	3	1	2	4	5	
4	Marek Sitnik (POL)	3	0	3	1	1	

Source: Official Report

	Score		CP
Fatih Bakır (TUR)	0–3	Yuri Evseichik (ISR)	0–3 PO
Marek Sitnik (POL)	0–4	David Vála (CZE)	0–3 PO
Fatih Bakır (TUR)	1–0	Marek Sitnik (POL)	3–0 PO
Yuri Evseichik (ISR)	5–1	David Vála (CZE)	3–1 PP
Fatih Bakır (TUR)	3–0	David Vála (CZE)	3–0 PO
Yuri Evseichik (ISR)	3–1	Marek Sitnik (POL)	3–1 PP

=== Knockout round ===
Quarterfinals
Héctor Milián (CUB)	0
Dmitry Debelka (BLR)	1
Georgiy Saldadze (UKR)	0
Aleksandr Karelin (RUS)	4

Semifinals
Dmitry Debelka (BLR)	0
Aleksandr Karelin (RUS)	3
Rulon Gardner (USA)	3
Yuri Evseichik (ISR)	2

Gold medal match
Aleksandr Karelin (RUS)	0
Rulon Gardner (USA)	1
Bronze medal match
Dmitry Debelka (BLR)	1
Yuri Evseichik (ISR)	0

Classification 5th–6th
Héctor Milián (CUB)	5
Georgiy Saldadze (UKR)	3

== Final standing ==
Rank	Athlete
1st place, gold medalist(s)	Rulon Gardner (USA)
2nd place, silver medalist(s)	Aleksandr Karelin (RUS)
3rd place, bronze medalist(s)	Dmitry Debelka (BLR)
4	Yuri Evseichik (ISR)
5	Héctor Milián (CUB)
6	Georgiy Saldadze (UKR)
7	Giuseppe Giunta (ITA)
8	Fatih Bakır (TUR)
9	David Vála (CZE)
10	Eddy Bengtsson (SWE)
11	Mihály Deák-Bárdos (HUN)
12	Rafael Barreno (VEN)
13	Haykaz Galstyan (ARM)
14	Zhao Hailin (CHN)
15	Omrane Ayari (TUN)
16	Helger Hallik (EST)
17	Marek Sitnik (POL)
18	Laszlo Kovacs (AUS)
19	Sergei Mureiko (BUL)
20	Mirian Giorgadze (GEO)
