= Aleksandr Karelin =

Russian wrestler and politician

- Александр Карелин
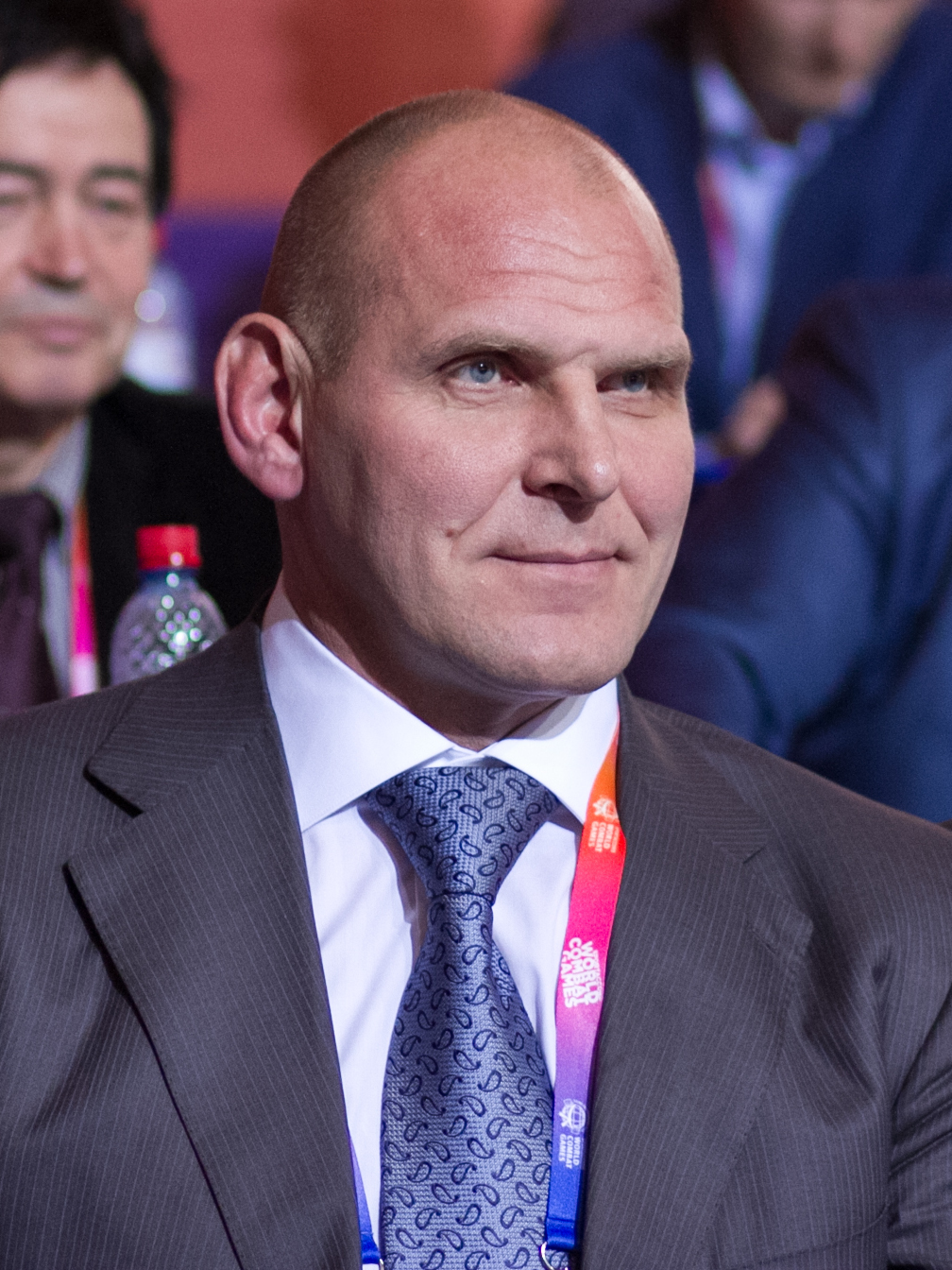
- Karelin in 2013

Russian Federation Senator from Novosibirsk Oblast
- Incumbent
- Assumed office 25 September 2020 Serving with Vladimir Gorodetsky
- Preceded by: Vladimir Laptev

Member of the State Duma for Novosibirsk Oblast
- In office 5 October 2016 – 15 September 2020
- Preceded by: constituency re-established
- Succeeded by: Alexander Aksyonenko
- Constituency: Iskitim (No. 137)
- In office 18 January 2000 – 29 December 2003
- Preceded by: Arkady Yankovsky
- Succeeded by: Anatoly Lokot
- Constituency: Zayeltsovsky (No. 126) (Note: Known as Novosibirsk constituency (No. 135) since 2016)

Member of the State Duma (Party List Seat)
- In office 29 December 2003 – 5 October 2016

Personal details
- Born: 19 September 1967 (age 59) Novosibirsk, Russian SFSR, Soviet Union
- Party: United Russia; Unity (until 2001)
- Education: Omsk State Institute of Physical Culture; Saint Petersburg State University (D.Sc.)

Personal information
- Height: 6 ft 3 in (191 cm) (Note: Sources vary on his height, with some listing him as 6 ft 4 in (193 cm))
- Weight: 286 lb (130 kg)

Sport
- Country: Soviet Union (1986–1991); Unified Team / CIS (1992); Russia (1993–2000)
- Sport: Wrestling
- Event: Greco-Roman
- Club: Dynamo Novosibirsk
- Coached by: Viktor Kuznetsov
- Retired: 2000
Medal record
Event	1st	2nd	3rd
Olympic Games	3	1	0
World Championship	9	0	0
World Cup	1	1	0
European Championship	12	0	0
Grand Prix Ivan Poddubny	5	0	0
Karelin Cup	1	0	0
World Junior Championships	2	0	0
European Junior Championships	1	0	0
Friendship-84 Juniors	1	0	0
Total	35	2	0
Olympic Games
Gold medal – first place	1988 Seoul	130 kg
Gold medal – first place	1992 Barcelona	130 kg
Gold medal – first place	1996 Atlanta	130 kg
Silver medal – second place	2000 Sydney	130 kg
World Championships
Gold medal – first place	Martigny 1989	130 kg
Gold medal – first place	Ostia 1990	130 kg
Gold medal – first place	Varna 1991	130 kg
Gold medal – first place	Stockholm 1993	130 kg
Gold medal – first place	Tampere 1994	130 kg
Gold medal – first place	Prague 1995	130 kg
Gold medal – first place	Wrocław 1997	130 kg
Gold medal – first place	Gävle 1998	130 kg
Gold medal – first place	Athens 1999	130 kg
World Cup
Gold medal – first place	Albany 1987	130 kg
Silver medal – second place	Besançon 1992	130 kg
European Championships
Gold medal – first place	Kolbotn 1988	130 kg
Gold medal – first place	Oulu 1989	130 kg
Gold medal – first place	Poznań 1990	130 kg
Gold medal – first place	Aschaffenburg 1991	130 kg
Gold medal – first place	Copenhagen 1992	130 kg
Gold medal – first place	Istanbul 1993	130 kg
Gold medal – first place	Athens 1994	130 kg
Gold medal – first place	Besançon 1995	130 kg
Gold medal – first place	Budapest 1996	130 kg
Gold medal – first place	Minsk 1998	130 kg
Gold medal – first place	Sofia 1999	130 kg
Gold medal – first place	Moscow 2000	130 kg
Karelin Cup
Gold medal – first place	Novosibirsk 1995	130 kg
Junior World Championships
Gold medal – first place	Colorado Springs 1985	130 kg
Gold medal – first place	Burnaby 1987	130 kg
Junior European Championships
Gold medal – first place	Malmö 1986	130 kg
Friendship-84 Juniors
Gold medal – first place	Budapest 1984	130 kg

Aleksandr Aleksandrovich Karelin (Russian: Александр Александрович Карелин, IPA: [ɐlʲɪkˈsandr‿əlʲɪkˈsandrəvʲɪtɕ kɐˈrʲelʲɪn]; born 19 September 1967) is a Russian politician and retired athlete.

Karelin competed in Greco-Roman wrestling, representing the Soviet Union and Russia between 1986 and 2000. Nicknamed the "Russian Bear", "Russian King Kong", "Alexander the Great", "The Experiment", and "The Crane from Novosibirsk", he is widely considered to be the greatest and most dominant Greco-Roman wrestler of all time. He won gold medals at the 1988, 1992, and 1996 Olympic Games under a different flag each time (Soviet Union, Unified Team, and Russia respectively), and a silver medal at the 2000 Olympic Games. His wrestling record at the senior level was 887 wins and two losses, both considered controversial and both by a single point. Prior to his defeat to American Rulon Gardner at the 2000 Olympics finals, a point had not been scored against him in competition the previous six years. He went undefeated in the World Championships, having never lost a match, winning nine gold medals, and he won twelve gold medals at the European Championships. His twelve gold medals at the world level are the most in men’s wrestling history across both freestyle and Greco-Roman disciplines. Karelin's thirteen total world-level medals are tied for the all-time record in men’s wrestling history, along with American wrestler Bruce Baumgartner. He was the national flag bearer at three consecutive Olympics: in 1988 for the Soviet Union, in 1992 for the Unified Team, and in 1996 for Russia.

Due to his dominance and accomplishments, he was named the greatest Greco-Roman wrestler of the 20th century by the International Federation of Associated Wrestling Styles (FILA), and is part of the class of ten inaugural inductees into the FILA International Wrestling Hall of Fame in 2003. In 2007, Karelin, alongside Buvaisar Saitiev, were voted the best wrestlers in the history of the sport by FILA. Four times he was awarded the "Golden Belt" as the best wrestler of the planet by FILA – in 1989, 1990, 1992, and 1994.

In addition to his success in wrestling, Karelin was a sambo champion during his service in the Internal Troops and participated in a strongman contest. In 1999, he competed in a mixed martial arts bout, defeating Akira Maeda by unanimous decision, though the bout is seen as a work. He was named a Hero of the Russian Federation in 1996. He entered politics in 1999, being elected a deputy of the State Duma that year. He sat in the Duma through various convocations until 2020, when he entered the Federation Council as a senator.

== Wrestling career ==
Karelin was born as a 5.5 kilograms (12 lb) baby. He was an avid fan of literature and mathematics during his school years. His father introduced him to strength training, giving him a kettlebell and sledgehammer and placing a truck tire in the yard for exercise. As a schoolboy, Karelin also loaded coal, gathered firewood, and cared for the family's livestock while his parents worked, which he credited his father with helping him develop his character. He began training in 1981, under Viktor Kuznetsov, who remained his coach through his entire career. He initially started boxing, following in the footsteps of his father, until he decided against it. He also tried weightlifting, skiing, basketball, volleyball and swimming, excelling in all the sports he tried. Being naturally very big, he came to a wrestling gym, aged 13, standing 179 centimetres (5 ft 10 in) tall and weighing 79 kilograms (174 lb), Karelin grew physically very fast and from 16 years of age throughout his entire career he competed in the super heavyweight division. Karelin was named Master of Sport of the USSR in 1984 and Master of Sport of the USSR, International Class by the age of 18 in 1985. Karelin won gold at Friendship-84 in Greco-Roman wrestling as a junior. In 1986, he competed in 14 tournaments, winning all of them. In 1985 and 1987, Karelin won the World Junior Championship, and in 1986, won the European Junior Championship.

Karelin had his first loss (score 0–1) at the senior level at the USSR championships in 1987, to the reigning Russian and European champion Igor Rostorotsky, which was considered controversial; he then defeated Rostorotsky at the next USSR Championships, while recovering from a flu and a recent concussion, by fall, and again in a match that would decide which of the two would go to the Summer Olympics, winning 2–0, effectively retiring Rostorotsky.

Karelin was a 13-time national champion of the USSR, CIS, and Russia from 1988 to 2000, with these national championships being regarded as hard to win as the European Championships, and arguably higher in level than the World Championships. He is listed as runner-up to David Koplovitz at the 1992 Wrestling World Cup, for while he won all of his matches at the event, his partner Andrey Grishin competed in the rest of the rounds, and so they did not accumulate enough ranking points to beat the American team.

"He's been the man for 13 years. Nobody even had a chance to beat him."

— Rulon Gardner on his opponent.

In the 1988 Olympic final Karelin beat Rangel Gerovski, by executing his signature Karelin Lift and won. With his win, Karelin became the youngest Greco-Roman wrestler to become an Olympic champion at super heavyweight (130 kg) at the age of 21 years and two days. After his first Olympic victory, Karelin was named Honored Master of Sport of the USSR in 1988. At the 1992 Summer Olympic Games in Barcelona, Karelin won one of the fastest Olympic wrestling matches, pinning Ioan Grigoraş in only 14 seconds. At the 1996 Summer Olympic Games in Atlanta, Karelin faced American Matt Ghaffari for the gold medal. Karelin had come off a shoulder surgery and looked vulnerable against a strong Ghaffari, who was able to repel Karelin's efforts to lift and slam him, forcing Karelin to use all of his skill and experience to defend a 1–0 lead.

In 1989, Karelin won the 28th edition of the Mälar Cup, defeating Tomas Johansson in the final. In 1995, the IV International Alexander Karelin Prize Tournament, also known as the Karelin Cup, was held in Novosibirsk. Karelin won, beating Matt Ghaffari in the final. Karelin is also a five-time winner of the International Tournament in Memory of Ivan Poddubny. Karelin won the World Championships nine times and the European Championships twelve times. At the 1990 World Championships Karelin pinned every opponent without giving up a single point.

After going 13 years undefeated in international competition and six years without giving up a point, he eventually lost 0–1 to Rulon Gardner of the United States in the final of the Sydney Olympics. Karelin had previously beaten Gardner in 1997 with a score of 5–0 and throwing him three times. His loss to Gardner is considered one of the biggest upsets in sports history. His loss in the final of the Sydney Olympics was his first and only international loss, having previously been unbeaten throughout his international career. Karelin retired from competitions in 2000.

Thus his only two losses at the senior level were in finals, those ultimately being the 1987 USSR Championships to Rostorotsky, and 2000 Summer Olympics to Gardner. However, both of his losses are considered controversial, with him also only losing to both opponents by a single point. Some argue, such as Finnish former wrestler Tuomo Karila, that Gardner should not have been awarded the point, and that Karelin should have won. Karelin lost a few matches at the junior level, but his senior level record was an astounding 887–2.

Karelin was dominant against his rivals, having a record of 11–0 against Swedish wrestler Tomas Johansson with a combined score of 74–1. He had a record of 23–0 against American wrestler Matt Ghaffari.

Karelin holds the record for most world-level gold medals at 12, the most for either freestyle or Greco-Roman wrestling in men's competitions, and also holds the joint-record for most medals at the world-level, with 13, which is tied with the American wrestler Bruce Baumgartner.

Karelin twice was the winner of the Spartakiad of the Peoples of the USSR, in 1986 and 1991.

=== Training style ===
Karelin was revered for his extraordinary strength and unprecedented success in international competition. He competed in the heaviest weight class of his day, 130 kg (286 lb). His coach was at first skeptical about a big but undeveloped boy, yet he accepted Karelin and motivated him for hard training, both in wrestling technique and physical strength. As a result, over the years Karelin progressed from 0 to 42 pull-ups. His conditioning and quickness combined with his dominance of the sport, led to him being known as "The Experiment". When asked why he thought he was called that (referring to a biased opinion on his alleged PED use), Karelin noted that: "No one can completely believe that I am natural. The most important drug is to train like a madman – really like a madman. The people who accuse me are those who have never trained once in their life like I train every day of my life."

Karelin's daily training drills included hours of rowing and long runs through Taiga forest often with a large log on his back. He favored the overhead press and also used standard 2-pood kettlebells (32 kilograms (71 lb)) for arm exercises at a daily weight routine. He would clean and press over 190 kilograms (420 lb). He would reportedly do 10 reps of 200 kilograms (440 lb) of Zercher deadlifts. Karelin would routinely bench press 204 kilograms (450 lb) or more as part of his workout. Despite his large physique, he was flexible and agile enough to do backflips and splits. Tuomo Karila, a Finnish Greco-Roman wrestler, noted that even for a heavyweight Karelin was remarkably strong and that he was unusually agile and fluid for his size, and recalled that Karelin was able to do around 50 chin-ups. Freestyle wrestler and Olympic gold medalist Anatoly Beloglazov recalled that despite his large frame, Karelin moved "like a small guy" while playing football, handling the ball well and being unusually fast for a heavyweight. He also noted that Karelin trained with very heavy weights and rapidly developed physical strength, and that Karelin could climb a rope as quickly as much lighter wrestlers and had no equal in the exercise despite Karelin weighing far more, stating that "he was so powerful". When asked about his toughest opponent, Karelin instantly replied: "My refrigerator," referring to the time for which he bear hugged his refrigerator, weighing over 500 lbs, and carried it up through eight flights of stairs of his hometown 9-storied apartment building.

=== Wrestling style ===
Karelin was famous for his reverse body lift, the Karelin Lift, where facing the opponent who was lying flat on the mat to keep from being thrown, Karelin hoisted his opponents into the air and slammed him violently to the mat. This devastatingly effective maneuver, when properly executed, awarded Karelin 5 points per throw, the maximum awarded in Greco-Roman wrestling. The throw had long been in use by lighter wrestlers but not by heavyweights – because of the immense strength required to raise, spin and hit the mat with a 560+ lbs combined weight of both athletes (280+ of which resist desperately to the performed maneuver). Karelin's ability to perform this throw against elite opponents weighing as much as 130 kg amazed other participants and observers of the sport. His exceptionally long reach, with measurements between 213 centimetres (84 in) and 220 centimetres (87 in), helped him to grip his opponents' bodies. Furthermore, his incredible grip strength was described as being similar to that of "an anaconda", which allowed him to hold down his opponents and prevent them from escaping from his grasp. He was known for his large stature such as a very thick neck and muscular legs. In his early matches before adopting the reverse body lift, Karelin used arm bars, half nelsons, and gut wrenches. His strength, size, explosiveness, flexibility and agility led Joe Rogan to describe Karelin as a "human panther".

"He didn't just dominate the world of Greco-Roman wrestling, for 13 years, he terrified the world of Greco-Roman wrestling!"

— Philip Hersh, an Olympic sports writer, on Karelin's legacy.

=== Other competitions ===
Beginning in 1985, Karelin served in the West Siberian Directorate of the Internal Troops of the USSR and later Russia. During his service, he competed in sambo and won the USSR Internal Troops Sambo Championship. He held several roles during Internal Troops service between 1986 and 1995: he was sports instructor of the 2nd category (1986–1991), instructor of the highest qualification (1991–1992), and finally, coach of the sports team (1992–1995).

Karelin took part in a strongman competition, that being the 1991 European Hercules, and without prior preparation, he managed to place 8th.

=== Injuries ===
Like most top wrestlers, Karelin had a number of severe injuries through his career. He credits his fast recoveries to Valery Okhapkin, physician of the national wrestling team, and claims that Okhapkin extended his competition lifetime by several years.

At the age of 15, Karelin broke his leg while competing in a junior tournament; having learned about this accident, his mother burned his wrestling uniform and forbade him to wrestle. At the 1988 USSR Championships, Karelin won and also defeated Igor Rostorotsky in a rematch, despite suffering from a concussion and high temperature. He won the 1993 World Championships despite breaking two ribs in the opening bout against Matt Ghaffari. Another injury occurred at the 1996 European Championships in Budapest, as he had torn the right pectoralis major muscle so badly that doctors predicted he would not be able to use his right hand for several months. Karelin won the Championships, but he had to be urgently operated on in Budapest. Despite not being fully recovered, he won the 1996 Olympics three months later. He has avoided multiple ear cartilage injuries of both ears, unlike many wrestlers.

== International competition record ==
Res.	Opponent	Method	Time/ Score	Date	Event	Location
2000 Olympic Silver Medalist at 130kg
Loss	(United States) Rulon Gardner	Decision	0–1	2000-09-25	2000 Olympic Games	(Australia) Sydney
Win	(Belarus) Dmitry Debelka	Decision	3–0	2000-09-25	2000 Olympic Games	(Australia) Sydney
Win	(Ukraine) Georgiy Saldadze	Decision	4–0	2000-09-25	2000 Olympic Games	(Australia) Sydney
Win	(Hungary) Mihály Deák-Bárdos	Decision	3–0	2000-09-25	2000 Olympic Games	(Australia) Sydney
Win	(Bulgaria) Sergei Mureiko	Decision	3–0	2000-09-25	2000 Olympic Games	(Australia) Sydney
1999 World Champion at 130kg
Win	(Cuba) Héctor Milián	Decision	3–0	1999-09-23	1999 World Wrestling Championships	(Greece) Athens
Win	(Bulgaria) Sergei Mureiko	Decision	0–0	1999-09-23	1999 World Wrestling Championships	(Greece) Athens
Win	(Ukraine) Georgiy Saldadze	Decision	3–0	1999-09-23	1999 World Wrestling Championships	(Greece) Athens
Win	(Sweden) Eddy Bengtsson	Tech Fall		1999-09-23	1999 World Wrestling Championships	(Greece) Athens
Win	(Italy) Giuseppe Giunta	Tech Fall		1999-09-23	1999 World Wrestling Championships	(Greece) Athens
Win	(Lithuania) Mindaugas Mizgaitis	Tech Fall		1999-09-23	1999 World Wrestling Championships	(Greece) Athens
1998 World Champion at 130kg
Win	(United States) Matt Ghaffari	Decision	8–0	1998-08-27	1998 World Wrestling Championships	(Sweden) Gävle
Win	(Ukraine) Georgiy Saldadze	Decision	4–0	1998-08-27	1998 World Wrestling Championships	(Sweden) Gävle
Win	(Israel) Yuri Evseichik	Decision	8–0	1998-08-27	1998 World Wrestling Championships	(Sweden) Gävle
Win	(Finland) Juha Ahokas	Fall		1998-08-27	1998 World Wrestling Championships	(Sweden) Gävle
1997 World Champion at 130kg
Win	(Hungary) Mihály Deák-Bárdos	Decision	11–0	1997-09-10	1997 World Wrestling Championships	(Poland) Wrocław
Win	(United States) Rulon Gardner	Decision	6–0	1997-09-10	1997 World Wrestling Championships	(Poland) Wrocław
Win	(Bulgaria) Sergei Mureiko	Decision	2–0	1997-09-10	1997 World Wrestling Championships	(Poland) Wrocław
Win	(South Korea) Young-Jin Yang	Decision	6–0	1997-09-10	1997 World Wrestling Championships	(Poland) Wrocław
1996 Olympic Gold Medalist at 130kg
Win	(United States) Matt Ghaffari	Decision	1–0	1996-07-22	1996 Olympic Games	(United States) Atlanta, Georgia
Win	(Greece) Panagiotis Poikilidis	Fall		1996-07-21	1996 Olympic Games	(United States) Atlanta, Georgia
Win	(Finland) Juha Ahokas	Fall		1996-07-21	1996 Olympic Games	(United States) Atlanta, Georgia
Win	(Moldova) Sergei Mureiko	Decision	2–0	1996-07-21	1996 Olympic Games	(United States) Atlanta, Georgia
Win	(Tunisia) Omrane Ayari	Decision	10–0	1996-07-21	1996 Olympic Games	(United States) Atlanta, Georgia
1992 Olympic Gold Medalist at 130kg
Win	(Sweden) Tomas Johansson	Fall		1992-07-29	1992 Olympic Games	(Spain) Barcelona
Win	(Romania) Ioan Grigoraş	Fall		1992-07-27	1992 Olympic Games	(Spain) Barcelona
Win	(Finland) Juha Ahokas	Decision	8–1	1992-07-27	1992 Olympic Games	(Spain) Barcelona
Win	(Cuba) Cándido Mesa	Fall		1992-07-27	1992 Olympic Games	(Spain) Barcelona
Win	(Canada) Andy Borodow	Fall		1992-07-27	1992 Olympic Games	(Spain) Barcelona
1989 World Champion at 130kg
Win	(Hungary) László Klauz	Decision	7–0	1989-08-26	1989 World Wrestling Championships	(Switzerland) Martigny
Win	(United States) Craig Pittman	Fall	3:16	1989-08-24	1989 World Wrestling Championships	(Switzerland) Martigny
1988 Olympic Gold Medalist at 130kg
Win	(Bulgaria) Rangel Gerovski	Decision	5–3	1988-09-22	1988 Olympic Games	(South Korea) Seoul
Win	(United States) Duane Koslowski	Tech Fall		1988-09-20	1988 Olympic Games	(South Korea) Seoul
Win	(Austria) Alexander Neumüller	Fall		1988-09-20	1988 Olympic Games	(South Korea) Seoul
Win	(Hungary) László Klauz	Passivity		1988-09-20	1988 Olympic Games	(South Korea) Seoul
Win	(Sweden) Tomas Johansson	Decision	5–0	1988-09-20	1988 Olympic Games	(South Korea) Seoul
1987 World Cup Winner at 130kg
Win	(United States) Jeff Blatnick	DQ	13–0	1987-10-15	1987 Wrestling World Cup	(United States) Albany, New York
Win	(Norway)	Walkover		1987-10-15	1987 Wrestling World Cup	(United States) Albany, New York
Win	(Cuba) Juan Poulot	Fall	1:26	1987-10-14	1987 Wrestling World Cup	(United States) Albany, New York
Win	(Japan) Kenichi Mikosawa			1987-10-14	1987 Wrestling World Cup	(United States) Albany, New York

== Mixed martial arts ==
On 21 February 1999, Karelin defeated Akira Maeda in a shoot wrestling contest put on by RINGS that drew a gate of over $1 million. The match gained widespread media coverage, including mentions in The New York Times and Sports Illustrated. The match took place in the Maeda-owned professional wrestling organization RINGS. Though widely considered to have been a work style wrestling contest, the match is counted as an official mixed martial arts (MMA) match in Sherdog's record database. Karelin weighed in at 134 kilograms (295 lb).

Professional record breakdown
1 match	1 win	0 losses
By decision	1	0

Res.	Record	Opponent	Method	Event	Date	Round	Time	Location	Notes
Win	1–0	Akira Maeda	Decision (Unanimous)	Rings: Final Capture	February 21, 1999	3	5:00	Japan	

== Political career ==
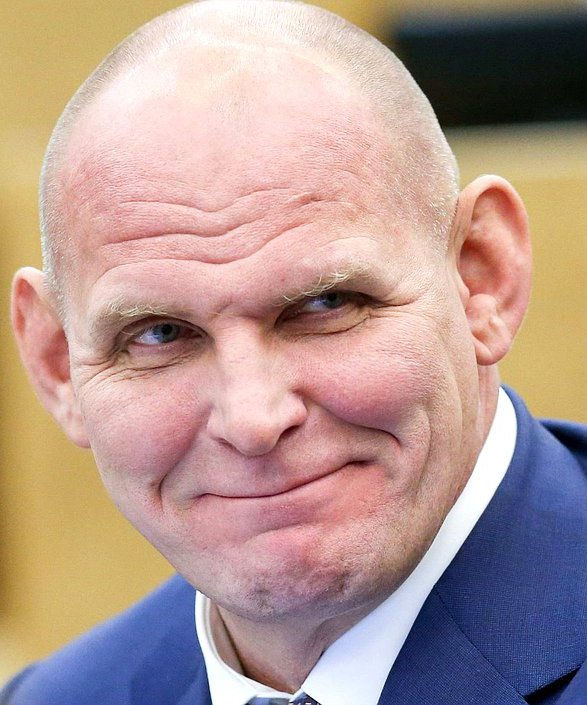
Karelin as a deputy of the State Duma in 2018.

Between 1995 and 1999, Karelin served with the Russian tax police and retired in the rank of colonel. Upon invitation from Vladimir Putin, in 1999, he began his political career. He joined the United Russia party and was elected to the State Duma as a representative of Novosibirsk Oblast in 1999 and 2003. In 2007, he was elected to the Duma as a representative of Stavropol Krai. He was a member of Duma's committee on international affairs. In 2017, he entered the PutinTeam, a social movement aimed at promoting Vladimir Putin's policies.

In 2020, Karelin was appointed as senator from the Legislative Assembly of Novosibirsk Oblast in the Federation Council. He took up the post on 25 September 2020, and is a member of the council's committee on International Affairs. He was sanctioned by the United Kingdom in 2022 in relation to the Russo-Ukrainian War.

== Personal life ==
Karelin graduated from the Novosibirsk Institute of Transportation in 1985, followed by the Siberian Academy of Physical Culture, a military school of the Soviet Ministry of Internal Affairs (MVD USSR) and the Saint Petersburg University of MVD USSR. In 1998 he defended a PhD and in 2002 a habilitation in sport-related pedagogy; he also holds a degree in law. His PhD is titled: "Methods of execution of suplex throw counters" (Russian: Методика проведения контрприемов от бросков прогибом), and "Integral training system for top-level wrestlers" (Russian: Система интегральной подготовки высококвалифицированных борцов).

Karelin's father was a truck driver and an amateur boxer. Karelin is married to Olga, they have two sons, Denis and Ivan, and one daughter, Vasilisa. Denis (born c. 1986) tried wrestling, but gave it up in favor of car racing. Ivan (born 1994) is coached by Kuznetsov and competes in the Greco-Roman superheavyweight division, in which he is a Master of Sport. Vasilisa (born c. 1999) is a rhythmic gymnast. Karelin had an older brother, Sergei Aleksandrovich Karelin, who died in 2017 at the age of 56.

Karelin described himself as a fifth-generation Siberian and stated that his ancestors had originally come to Siberia as exiles.

Karelin is an Orthodox Christian. Since he was young, Karelin has sought to be a "classical man", and is well-versed in music and literature, with an interpreter of his stating "His knowledge and his feeling for poetry, literature and music are incredible."

== Legacy and awards ==
Karelin was named as the greatest Greco-Roman wrestler of the 20th century by the International Federation of Associated Wrestling Styles (FILA), and is one of the class of ten inaugural inductees into the FILA International Wrestling Hall of Fame in 2003. In 2007, Karelin, alongside Buvaisar Saitiev, were voted the best wrestlers in the history of the sport by FILA. Four times he was awarded the "Golden Belt" as the best wrestler of the planet by FILA – in 1989, 1990, 1992, and 1994. He was also included in the 25 best world athletes of the 20th century. Since 1992, an annual wrestling competition is held in Novosibirsk in his honor.

He is cited as being one of the most dominant athletes of all time, and as being one of the greatest of all time. He is remembered as being one of the most feared and intimidating athletes ever. He is also seen as one of the most gifted athletes of all time due to his combination of explosiveness, strength, intellect, flexibility, and agility. The UFC commentator Joe Rogan described him as "the scariest wrestler of all time" and a "human panther".

He has been praised as one of the greatest wrestlers ever by, or usually as the single greatest ever, by other combat athletes like Abdulrashid Sadulaev, Alexander Romanov, Mark Madsen, Juha Ahokas, and even by Rulon Gardner himself.

Rulon Gardner stated about Karelin that:

Karelin - God. He was and will remain the best fighter. True, some now think that I am the best. But I'm just an Olympic champion. And I will go down in history not as Rulon Gardner, but as the winner of Karelin.

Karelin was named a Hero of the Russian Federation in 1996 and awarded the Order of Friendship of Peoples (1989), Order of Honour (2001) and Order "For Merit to the Fatherland" IV class (2008). He was awarded the Serbian Order of Saint Sava. In 2017, he was awarded the Order "For Merit to the Republic of Dagestan". He was also named a Merited Master of Sports of the USSR (1988).

He is a hidden playable character in the Japan-only, AKI Corporation-created, Nintendo 64 video game: Virtual Pro Wrestling 2.

== See also ==
- List of Heroes of the Russian Federation

== Notes ==
Olympic Games
Preceded by Nikolay Balboshin	Flagbearer for Soviet Union / Unified Team / Russia; Seoul 1988; Barcelona 1992; Atlanta 1996	Succeeded by Andrey Lavrov
