= Sajjad Barzi =

Iranian wrestler (born 1981)

Personal information
- Full name: Sajjad Barzi
- Nationality: Iran
- Born: 5 March 1981 (age 45) Tehran, Iran
- Height: 1.95 m (6 ft 5 in)
- Weight: 120 kg (265 lb)

Sport
- Style: Greco-Roman
- Club: Haftir Tehran
- Coach: Hassan Babak
Medal record
Men's Greco-Roman wrestling
Representing Iran
Asian Championships
Silver medal – second place	2006 Almaty	120 kg
Bronze medal – third place	2004 Almaty	120 kg
Bronze medal – third place	2005 Wuhan	120 kg

Sajjad Barzi (Persian: سجاد برزی; born March 5, 1981, in Tehran) is a retired amateur Iranian Greco-Roman wrestler, who competed in the men's super heavyweight category. Barzi has claimed three medals (one silver and two bronze) in the 120-kg division at the Asian Championships (2004, 2005, and 2006), and later finished fourth at the 2004 Summer Olympics. Throughout his sporting career, Barzi trained full-time for Hafti Wrestling Club in Tehran, under his head coach Hassan Babak.

Barzi qualified for the Iranian squad in the men's 120 kg class at the 2004 Summer Olympics in Athens, by placing first and receiving a berth from the Olympic Qualification Tournament in Novi Sad, Serbia and Montenegro. Emerging as a surprise medal contender in his category, Barzi quickly edged Hungary's Mihály Deák-Bárdos out of the ring in his opening match, and then grappled Finnish wrestler and four-time Olympian Juha Ahokas by a 2–1 sudden death decision in the round-robin pool to secure him a spot in the knockout rounds. He delivered a stunning maneuver to beat France's Yannick Szczepaniak 3–0 on his quarterfinal match, before being tamed by Russia's reigning world champion Khasan Baroyev in the semifinals. Facing off against U.S. wrestler and defending Olympic champion Rulon Gardner for the bronze medal, Barzi could not throw his formidable opponent off the mat and lost the match 3–0 in overtime.

At the 2006 Asian Wrestling Championships in Almaty, Kazakhstan, Barzi captured the silver medal in his final showdown against the host country's Georgiy Tsurtsumia, producing his marvelous career record to three medals in total (two of which were bronze in 2004 and 2005).
