= Ahokas =

Ahokas is a Finnish surname. Notable people with the surname include:

- Antti Ahokas (born 1985), Finnish golfer
- Juha Ahokas (born 1969), Finnish Greco-Roman wrestler
- Pertti Ahokas (born 1947), Finnish ice hockey player
