= Wrestling at the 2004 Summer Olympics – Men's Greco-Roman 120 kg =

Men's Greco-Roman 120 kg at the Games of the XXVIII Olympiad
- Venue: Ano Liosia Olympic Hall
- Date: 24–25 August 2004
- Competitors: 20 from 20 nations

Medalists
1st place, gold medalist(s)		Khasan Baroev	Russia
2nd place, silver medalist(s)		Georgiy Tsurtsumia	Kazakhstan
3rd place, bronze medalist(s)		Rulon Gardner	United States

The men's Greco-Roman 120 kilograms at the 2004 Summer Olympics as part of the wrestling program were held at the Ano Liosia Olympic Hall, August 24 to August 25.

The competition held with an elimination system of three or four wrestlers in each pool, with the winners qualify for the quarterfinals, semifinals and final by way of direct elimination.

== Schedule ==
All times are Eastern European Summer Time (UTC+03:00)

Date	Time	Event
24 August 2004	09:30	Round 1
24 August 2004	09:30	Round 2
24 August 2004	17:30	Round 3
24 August 2004	17:30	Qualification
25 August 2004	09:30	Semifinals
25 August 2004	17:30	Finals

== Results ==
Legend

- WO — Won by walkover

=== Elimination pools ===
==== Pool 1 ====
Pos	Athlete	Pld	W	L	CP	TP	Qualification
1	Yannick Szczepaniak (FRA)	2	2	0	7	13	Knockout round
2	Haykaz Galstyan (ARM)	2	1	1	4	10	
3	Rafael Barreno (VEN)	2	0	2	1	3	

Source: Official website

	Score		CP
Haykaz Galstyan (ARM)	1–3	Yannick Szczepaniak (FRA)	1–3 PP
Rafael Barreno (VEN)	3–9	Haykaz Galstyan (ARM)	1–3 PP
Yannick Szczepaniak (FRA)	10–0	Rafael Barreno (VEN)	4–0 ST

==== Pool 2 ====
Pos	Athlete	Pld	W	L	CP	TP	Qualification
1	Sajjad Barzi (IRI)	2	2	0	6	5	Knockout round
2	Mihály Deák-Bárdos (HUN)	2	1	1	4	4	
3	Juha Ahokas (FIN)	2	0	2	1	1	

Source: Official website

	Score		CP
Mihály Deák-Bárdos (HUN)	3–0	Juha Ahokas (FIN)	3–0 PO
Sajjad Barzi (IRI)	3–1	Mihály Deák-Bárdos (HUN)	3–1 PP
Juha Ahokas (FIN)	1–2	Sajjad Barzi (IRI)	1–3 PP

==== Pool 3 ====
Pos	Athlete	Pld	W	L	CP	TP	Qualification
1	Khasan Baroev (RUS)	2	2	0	6	8	Knockout round
2	David Vála (CZE)	2	1	1	3	3	
3	Andrei Chekhauskoi (BLR)	2	0	2	0	0	

Source: Official website

	Score		CP
David Vála (CZE)	0–5	Khasan Baroev (RUS)	0–3 PO
Andrei Chekhauskoi (BLR)	0–3	David Vála (CZE)	0–3 PO
Khasan Baroev (RUS)	3–0	Andrei Chekhauskoi (BLR)	3–0 PO

==== Pool 4 ====
Pos	Athlete	Pld	W	L	CP	TP	Qualification
1	Mijaín López (CUB)	2	2	0	6	9	Knockout round
2	Yekta Yılmaz Gül (TUR)	2	1	1	3	3	
3	Yuri Evseichik (ISR)	2	0	2	0	0	

Source: Official website

	Score		CP
Yuri Evseichik (ISR)	0–5	Mijaín López (CUB)	0–3 PO
Yekta Yılmaz Gül (TUR)	3–0	Yuri Evseichik (ISR)	3–0 PO
Mijaín López (CUB)	4–0	Yekta Yılmaz Gül (TUR)	3–0 PO

==== Pool 5 ====
Pos	Athlete	Pld	W	L	CP	TP	Qualification
1	Georgiy Tsurtsumia (KAZ)	3	2	1	8	11	Knockout round
2	Xenofon Koutsioumpas (GRE)	3	2	1	7	11	
3	Eddy Bengtsson (SWE)	3	1	2	3 (Note: Head-to-head result: SWE 3–0 GEO.)	4	
4	Mirian Giorgadze (GEO)	3	1	2	3	2	

Source: Official website
Notes:

	Score		CP
Georgiy Tsurtsumia (KAZ)	2–2	Xenofon Koutsioumpas (GRE)	3–1 PP
Mirian Giorgadze (GEO)	0–3	Eddy Bengtsson (SWE)	0–3 PO
Georgiy Tsurtsumia (KAZ)	2–2	Mirian Giorgadze (GEO)	1–3 PP
Xenofon Koutsioumpas (GRE)	5–0	Eddy Bengtsson (SWE)	3–0 PO
Georgiy Tsurtsumia (KAZ)	7–1 Fall	Eddy Bengtsson (SWE)	4–0 TO
Xenofon Koutsioumpas (GRE)	4–0	Mirian Giorgadze (GEO)	3–0 PO

==== Pool 6 ====
Pos	Athlete	Pld	W	L	CP	TP	Qualification
1	Rulon Gardner (USA)	3	3	0	9	7	Knockout round
2	Sergei Mureiko (BUL)	3	2	1	7	6	
3	Mindaugas Mizgaitis (LTU)	3	1	2	4	4	
4	Marek Mikulski (POL)	3	0	3	0	0	

Source: Official website

	Score		CP
Rulon Gardner (USA)	3–0	Mindaugas Mizgaitis (LTU)	3–0 PO
Sergei Mureiko (BUL)	3–0	Marek Mikulski (POL)	3–0 PO
Rulon Gardner (USA)	1–1	Sergei Mureiko (BUL)	3–1 PP
Mindaugas Mizgaitis (LTU)	3–0	Marek Mikulski (POL)	3–0 PO
Rulon Gardner (USA)	3–0	Marek Mikulski (POL)	3–0 PO
Mindaugas Mizgaitis (LTU)	1–2	Sergei Mureiko (BUL)	1–3 PP

=== Knockout round ===
Qualification
Yannick Szczepaniak (FRA)	0
Sajjad Barzi (IRI)	3
Khasan Baroev (RUS)	2
Mijaín López (CUB)	0

Semifinals
Sajjad Barzi (IRI)	0
Khasan Baroev (RUS)	4
Georgiy Tsurtsumia (KAZ)	4
Rulon Gardner (USA)	1

Gold medal match
Khasan Baroev (RUS)	4
Georgiy Tsurtsumia (KAZ)	2
Bronze medal match
Sajjad Barzi (IRI)	0
Rulon Gardner (USA)	3

Classification 5–6
Yannick Szczepaniak (FRA)
Mijaín López (CUB)	WO

== Final standing ==
Rank	Athlete
1st place, gold medalist(s)	Khasan Baroev (RUS)
2nd place, silver medalist(s)	Georgiy Tsurtsumia (KAZ)
3rd place, bronze medalist(s)	Rulon Gardner (USA)
4	Sajjad Barzi (IRI)
5	Mijaín López (CUB)
6	Yannick Szczepaniak (FRA)
7	Xenofon Koutsioumpas (GRE)
8	Sergei Mureiko (BUL)
9	Haykaz Galstyan (ARM)
10	Mihály Deák-Bárdos (HUN)
11	Mindaugas Mizgaitis (LTU)
12	Eddy Bengtsson (SWE)
13	Yekta Yılmaz Gül (TUR)
14	David Vála (CZE)
15	Mirian Giorgadze (GEO)
16	Rafael Barreno (VEN)
17	Juha Ahokas (FIN)
18	Andrei Chekhauskoi (BLR)
19	Yuri Evseichik (ISR)
20	Marek Mikulski (POL)
