= 2006 Asian Wrestling Championships =

- Host city: Almaty, Kazakhstan
- Dates: 4–9 April 2006
- Stadium: Baluan Sholak Sports Palace

Champions
- Freestyle: Iran
- Greco-Roman: Kazakhstan
- Women: Japan

The 2006 Asian Wrestling Championships were held in Almaty, Kazakhstan. The event took place from April 4 to April 9, 2006.

== Medal table ==
| Rank | Nation | Gold | Silver | Bronze | Total |
|---|---|---|---|---|---|
| 1 | Kazakhstan | 6 | 2 | 6 | 14 |
| 2 | Japan | 5 | 2 | 2 | 9 |
| 3 | Iran | 3 | 2 | 5 | 10 |
| 4 | South Korea | 3 | 0 | 9 | 12 |
| 5 | China | 2 | 6 | 3 | 11 |
| 6 | North Korea | 1 | 3 | 0 | 4 |
| 7 | Mongolia | 1 | 2 | 2 | 5 |
| 8 | Kyrgyzstan | 0 | 2 | 3 | 5 |
| 9 | Uzbekistan | 0 | 1 | 7 | 8 |
| 10 | Chinese Taipei | 0 | 1 | 2 | 3 |
| 11 | Vietnam | 0 | 0 | 2 | 2 |
| 12 | Iraq | 0 | 0 | 1 | 1 |
| Totals (12 entries) | | 21 | 21 | 42 | 84 |

== Team ranking ==
| Rank | Men's freestyle | | Men's Greco-Roman | | Women's freestyle | |
| Rank | Team | Points | Team | Points | Team | Points |
|---|---|---|---|---|---|---|
| 1 | Iran | 55 | Kazakhstan | 61 | Japan | 68 |
| 2 | Kazakhstan | 54 | South Korea | 60 | China | 62 |
| 3 | Japan | 38 | Iran | 50 | Kazakhstan | 40 |
| 4 | Mongolia | 36 | Uzbekistan | 48 | Kyrgyzstan | 35 |
| 5 | China | 35 | Kyrgyzstan | 44 | South Korea | 32 |

== Medal summary ==
=== Men's freestyle ===
| Event | Gold | Silver | Bronze |
|---|---|---|---|
| 55 kg | Mohammad Rezaei; Iran | Jon Hyon-guk; North Korea | Masashi Saito; Japan |
| 55 kg | Mohammad Rezaei; Iran | Jon Hyon-guk; North Korea | Yoo Hyun-jin; South Korea |
| 60 kg | Ri Yong-chol; North Korea | Morad Mohammadi; Iran | Bauyrzhan Orazgaliyev; Kazakhstan |
| 60 kg | Ri Yong-chol; North Korea | Morad Mohammadi; Iran | Sengedorjiin Sükhbaatar; Mongolia |
| 66 kg | Leonid Spiridonov; Kazakhstan | Buyanjavyn Batzorig; Mongolia | Baek Jin-kuk; South Korea |
| 66 kg | Leonid Spiridonov; Kazakhstan | Buyanjavyn Batzorig; Mongolia | Arslan Khutaliev; Uzbekistan |
| 74 kg | Hadi Habibi; Iran | Siriguleng; China | Talant Jekshenov; Kyrgyzstan |
| 74 kg | Hadi Habibi; Iran | Siriguleng; China | Yosuke Kato; Japan |
| 84 kg | Chagnaadorjiin Ganzorig; Mongolia | Zaurbek Sokhiev; Uzbekistan | Majid Khodaei; Iran |
| 84 kg | Chagnaadorjiin Ganzorig; Mongolia | Zaurbek Sokhiev; Uzbekistan | Gennadiy Laliyev; Kazakhstan |
| 96 kg | Nurzhan Katayev; Kazakhstan | Aleksey Krupnyakov; Kyrgyzstan | Hamid Seifi; Iran |
| 96 kg | Nurzhan Katayev; Kazakhstan | Aleksey Krupnyakov; Kyrgyzstan | Gürjavyn Batpürev; Mongolia |
| 120 kg | Marid Mutalimov; Kazakhstan | Liang Lei; China | Hadi Pouralijan; Iran |
| 120 kg | Marid Mutalimov; Kazakhstan | Liang Lei; China | Urmat Mustapaev; Kyrgyzstan |

=== Men's Greco-Roman ===
| Event | Gold | Silver | Bronze |
|---|---|---|---|
| 55 kg | Lee Jung-baik; South Korea | Cha Kwang-su; North Korea | Akbar Kuziev; Uzbekistan |
| 55 kg | Lee Jung-baik; South Korea | Cha Kwang-su; North Korea | Hamid Banitamim; Iran |
| 60 kg | Nurbakyt Tengizbayev; Kazakhstan | Sheng Jiang; China | Bae Myung-hwan; South Korea |
| 60 kg | Nurbakyt Tengizbayev; Kazakhstan | Sheng Jiang; China | Jakhongir Imanov; Uzbekistan |
| 66 kg | Jung Ji-hyun; South Korea | Kim Kum-chol; North Korea | Ravshan Ruzikulov; Uzbekistan |
| 66 kg | Jung Ji-hyun; South Korea | Kim Kum-chol; North Korea | Beibit Nugumanov; Kazakhstan |
| 74 kg | Davoud Abedinzadeh; Iran | Daniar Kobonov; Kyrgyzstan | Bakhodir Muminov; Uzbekistan |
| 74 kg | Davoud Abedinzadeh; Iran | Daniar Kobonov; Kyrgyzstan | Roman Melyoshin; Kazakhstan |
| 84 kg | Kim Jung-sub; South Korea | Vitaliy Zakharchenko; Kazakhstan | Denis Zdorikov; Uzbekistan |
| 84 kg | Kim Jung-sub; South Korea | Vitaliy Zakharchenko; Kazakhstan | Ghasem Rezaei; Iran |
| 96 kg | Margulan Assembekov; Kazakhstan | Chen Xiaofei; China | Abdulmalik Aliev; Uzbekistan |
| 96 kg | Margulan Assembekov; Kazakhstan | Chen Xiaofei; China | Han Tae-young; South Korea |
| 120 kg | Georgiy Tsurtsumia; Kazakhstan | Sajjad Barzi; Iran | Kim Gwang-seok; South Korea |
| 120 kg | Georgiy Tsurtsumia; Kazakhstan | Sajjad Barzi; Iran | Jasim Breesam; Iraq |

=== Women's freestyle ===
| Event | Gold | Silver | Bronze |
|---|---|---|---|
| 48 kg | Yuri Funatsu; Japan | Wu Li-chuan; Chinese Taipei | Li Xiaomei; China |
| 48 kg | Yuri Funatsu; Japan | Wu Li-chuan; Chinese Taipei | Kim Hyung-joo; South Korea |
| 51 kg | Wen Juling; China | Yuri Kai; Japan | Lê Thị Trang; Vietnam |
| 51 kg | Wen Juling; China | Yuri Kai; Japan | Wang Ying-chi; Chinese Taipei |
| 55 kg | Chikako Matsukawa; Japan | Liu Haixin; China | Nghiêm Thị Giang; Vietnam |
| 55 kg | Chikako Matsukawa; Japan | Liu Haixin; China | Lee So-lae; South Korea |
| 59 kg | Seiko Yamamoto; Japan | Su Lihui; China | Su Ying-tzu; Chinese Taipei |
| 59 kg | Seiko Yamamoto; Japan | Su Lihui; China | Park Sang-eun; South Korea |
| 63 kg | Ayako Shoda; Japan | Yelena Shalygina; Kazakhstan | Hang Jin-young; South Korea |
| 63 kg | Ayako Shoda; Japan | Yelena Shalygina; Kazakhstan | Gao Pei; China |
| 67 kg | Su Huihua; China | Mimi Sugawara; Japan | Olga Kalinina; Kazakhstan |
| 67 kg | Su Huihua; China | Mimi Sugawara; Japan | Yana Panova; Kyrgyzstan |
| 72 kg | Kyoko Hamaguchi; Japan | Ochirbatyn Burmaa; Mongolia | Qin Xiaoqing; China |
| 72 kg | Kyoko Hamaguchi; Japan | Ochirbatyn Burmaa; Mongolia | Olga Zhanibekova; Kazakhstan |
