= Zhao Hailin =

Chinese Greco-Roman wrestler

Personal information
- Full name: Zhao Hailin
- Nationality: China
- Born: 20 May 1977 (age 49) Shanghai, China
- Height: 1.96 m (6 ft 5 in)
- Weight: 99 kg (218 lb)

Sport
- Style: Greco-Roman
- Club: Shanghai University of Sport
- Coach: Zhang Wenqiu
Medal record
Men's Greco-Roman wrestling
Representing China
Asian Games
Bronze medal – third place	1998 Bangkok	130 kg
Asian Championships
Gold medal – first place	2000 Seoul	130 kg
Bronze medal – third place	1999 Tashkent	130 kg

Zhao Hailin (Chinese: 赵海林; pinyin: Zhào Hǎilín; born May 20, 1977) is a Chinese former Greco-Roman wrestler, who competed in the men's super heavyweight category. Throughout his wrestling career, Zhao owned a tally of two medals, a gold (2000) and a bronze (1999), at the Asian Championships, picked up a bronze in the 130-kg division at the 1998 Asian Games in Bangkok, and eventually represented China at the 2000 Summer Olympics. Zhao trained under the tutelage of his personal coach and mentor Zhang Wenqiu at the Shanghai University of Sport.

Zhao qualified for the Chinese wrestling squad in the men's super heavyweight class (130 kg) at the 2000 Summer Olympics in Sydney, by finishing fifth and receiving a berth from the fourth stop of the Olympic Qualifying Tournament in Denver, Colorado, United States. There, he lost his opening match to three-time Olympian and 1992 heavyweight champion Héctor Milián of Cuba by an arduous 0–1 verdict, but bounced back to turn down Estonia's Helger Hallik on the mat with a magnificent 3–2 score to close the prelim pool. Placing fourteenth out of twenty registered wrestlers in his signature category, Zhao's feat was not enough to advance him further to the quarterfinals.
