= Wrestling at the 2011 Pan American Games – Men's Greco-Roman 120 kg =

Men's Greco–Roman 120 kg at the 2011 Pan American Games
- Venue: CODE II Gymnasium
- Dates: October 20
- Competitors: 8 from 8 nations

Medalists
Gold medal	Mijaín López	Cuba
Silver medal	Rafael Barreno	Venezuela
Bronze medal	Ramon Garcia	Dominican Republic
Bronze medal	Victor Asprilla	Colombia

The men's Greco-Roman 120 kg competition of the wrestling events at the 2011 Pan American Games in Guadalajara, Mexico, was held on October 20 at the CODE II Gymanasium. The defending champion was Mijaín López of Cuba.

This Greco-Roman wrestling competition consisted of a single-elimination tournament, with a repechage used to determine the winner of two bronze medals. The two finalists faced off for gold and silver medals. Each wrestler who lost to one of the two finalists moved into the repechage, culminating in a pair of bronze medal matches featuring the semifinal losers each facing the remaining repechage opponent from his half of the bracket.

Each bout consisted of up to three rounds, lasting two minutes apiece. The wrestler who scored more points in each round was the winner of that round; the bout ended when one wrestler had won two rounds, and thus the match.

== Schedule ==
All times are Central Standard Time (UTC-6).

Date	Time	Round
October 20, 2011	10:32	Quarterfinals
October 20, 2011	11:20	Semifinals
October 20, 2011	18:16	Bronze medal matches
October 20, 2011	18:56	Final

== Results ==
=== Finals round ===
Quarterfinals
Mijaín López (CUB)	5
Orlando Ramirez (MEX)	0
Ramon Garcia (DOM)	2
Timothy Taylor (USA)	0
Victor Asprilla (COL)	1	1
Edgardo Lopez (PUR)	0	0
Romel Maza (ECU)	0	0
Rafael Barreno (VEN)	3	4

Semifinals
Mijaín López (CUB)	1	6
Ramon Garcia (DOM)	0	0
Victor Asprilla (COL)	0	0
Rafael Barreno (VEN)	1	2

Finals
Mijaín López (CUB)	6	6
Rafael Barreno (VEN)	0	0

=== Repechage round ===
Two bronze medals were awarded.

Repechage round 1	Bronze Medal Bout
	Orlando Ramirez (MEX)	0
Orlando Ramirez (MEX)	Ramon Garcia (DOM)	5
Bye

Repechage round 1	Bronze Medal Bout
	Romel Maza (ECU)	0
Romel Maza (ECU)	Victor Asprilla (COL)	1
Bye
