= Rafael Barreno =

Venezuelan Greco-Roman wrestler

Personal information
- Full name: Rafael Barreno Martínez
- Nationality: Venezuela
- Born: 30 September 1977 (age 48) Punto Fijo, Falcón, Venezuela
- Height: 1.83 m (6 ft 0 in)
- Weight: 120 kg (265 lb)

Sport
- Style: Greco-Roman
- Club: Pena Gillit
- Coach: Milcho Radulovski
Medal record
Men's Greco-Roman wrestling
Representing Venezuela
Pan American Games
Silver medal – second place	2011 Guadalajara	120 kg
Bronze medal – third place	1999 Winnipeg	130 kg
Bronze medal – third place	2003 Santo Domingo	120 kg
Bronze medal – third place	2007 Rio de Janeiro	120 kg
Central American and Caribbean Games
Gold medal – first place	2010 Mayagüez	120 kg

Rafael Barreno Martínez (born September 30, 1977 in Punto Fijo, Falcón) is an amateur Venezuelan Greco-Roman wrestler, who competed in the men's super heavyweight category. Considering one of South America's top Greco-Roman wrestlers in his decade, Barreno has claimed a prestigious gold medal at the 2010 Central American and Caribbean Games in Mayagüez, Puerto Rico, produced a staggering tally of four medals (one silver and three bronze) at the Pan American Games, and also represented as part of the Venezuelan team in two editions of the Olympic Games (2000 and 2004). Throughout his sporting career, Barreno currently trains for Pena Gillit Wrestling Club in his native town Punto Fijo, under his personal coach Milcho Radulovski.

== Career ==
Barreno made his official debut at the 2000 Summer Olympics in Sydney, where he competed in the men's super heavyweight division (130 kg). He lost his opening match to Ukraine's Georgiy Saldadze by a tough 0–9 blowout, but redeemed himself to dismantle Australia's Laszlo Kovacs into the ring with a four-point advantage on his second bout. Finishing second in the prelim pool and twelfth overall in the final rankings, Barreno's performance fell short to put him further into the quarterfinals.

At the 2004 Summer Olympics in Athens, Barreno qualified for his second Venezuelan squad, as a 26-year-old, in the men's 120 kg class by placing fifth and receiving a berth from the first Olympic Qualification Tournament in Novi Sad, Serbia and Montenegro. Unlike his previous Games, Barreno suffered through a less tactical game plan as he lost two straight matches each to Armenia's fellow two-time Olympian Haykaz Galstyan with an arduous 3–9 decision, and France's Yannick Szczepaniak, who threw him off the mat by a technical superiority, in the prelim pool. Barreno failed again to advance further into the quarterfinals after finishing the pool in last place and sixteenth overall.

Barreno sought to compete in two more editions of the Olympic Games (2008 and 2012), but missed a chance to earn a spot on the Venezuelan team through the Olympic Qualification Tournament. In 2010, Barreno emerged himself into the global and continental scene, as he took home his first gold in the super heavyweight division at the Central American and Caribbean Games in Mayagüez, Puerto Rico, thrashing Panama's Irving Herrera in the process. Because of his brilliant success, Barreno was officially named the Athlete of the Year by the Venezuelan Federation of Amateur Wrestling. The following year, Barreno continued to flourish his sporting career, as he picked up a silver medal on his final match against Cuban wrestler and defending Olympic champion Mijaín López at the 2011 Pan American Games in Guadalajara, Mexico, producing a stark record of four medals, including three bronze, to his career hardware.
