= Igor Rostorotsky =

Soviet wrestler (born 1962)

Igor Dmitrievich Rostorotsky
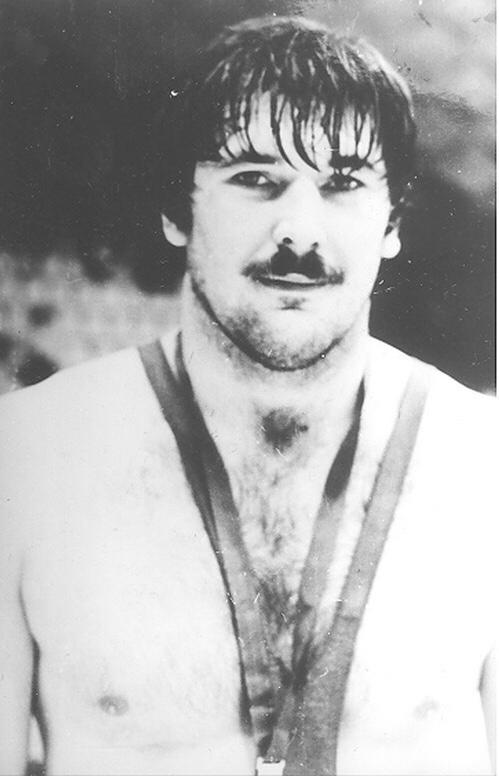

Personal information
- Born: 4 February 1962 (age 64) Anapa, Russia
- Height: 1.95 m (6 ft 5 in)
- Weight: 125 kg (276 lb)

Sport
- Sport: Greco-Roman wrestling
- Club: Dynamo Karagandy
Medal record
Representing the Soviet Union
World Championships
Gold medal – first place	1985 Kolbotn	130 kg
Gold medal – first place	1987 Clermont-Ferrand	130 kg
World Cup
Gold medal – first place	1984 Seinäjoki	+100 kg
Gold medal – first place	1986 Oak Lawn	130 kg
Gold medal – first place	1988 Athens	130 kg
European Championships
Bronze medal – third place	1984 Jönköping	+100 kg
Gold medal – first place	1985 Leipzig	130 kg
Gold medal – first place	1987 Tampere	130 kg
Junior World Championships
Gold medal – first place	1981 Vancouver	+100 kg
Youth European Championships
Gold medal – first place	1982 Leipzig	+100 kg

Igor Dmitrievich Rostorotsky (Russian: Игорь Дмитриевич Ростороцкий; born 4 February 1962) is a retired Soviet Greco-Roman wrestler who competed in the superheavyweight division. He won both the world and European titles in 1985 and 1987. He was the first, and one of only two wrestlers to defeat Aleksandr Karelin, having won the 1987 championship of the Soviet Union, after which Karelin would dominate their rivalry from then on.

Rostorotsky was born in Russia, but later moved to Kazakhstan and graduated from the Karagandy State University with a degree in law. He was also named a Merited Master of Sports of the USSR (1986).
