= Andrei Chekhauskoi =

Belarusian Greco-Roman wrestler

Personal information
- Full name: Andrei Paulavich Chekhauskoi
- Nationality: Belarus
- Born: 7 April 1979 (age 47) Minsk, Belarusian SSR, Soviet Union
- Height: 2.00 m (6 ft 6 1/2 in)
- Weight: 120 kg (265 lb)

Sport
- Style: Greco-Roman
- Club: SKA Minsk
- Coach: Uladzimir Primak

Andrei Paulavich Chekhauskoi (Belarusian: Андрэй Паўлавіч Чэхаўскай; born April 7, 1979) is a retired amateur Belarusian Greco-Roman wrestler, who competed in the men's super heavyweight category. Standing at 2.00 metres (6 feet 7 inches) tall and weighing at exactly 120 kg, Chekhauskoi offered a chance to claim a spot at the very last minute to represent his nation Belarus at the 2004 Summer Olympics. He also trained as a member of the Greco-Roman wrestling team for SKA Minsk, under his personal coach Uladzimir Primak.

Chekhauskoi qualified for the Belarusian squad in the men's super heavyweight class (120 kg) at the 2004 Summer Olympics in Athens, by receiving an allocated place from the International Wrestling Federation (French: Fédération Internationale des Luttes Associées, FILA). Chekhauskoi suffered through a vulnerable game plan as he was immediately overpowered by Czech Republic's David Vála and could not recover his from after losing out to Russian wrestler and 2003 world champion Khasan Baroyev on his second bout, finishing third in the prelim pool and eighteenth in the overall rankings without acquiring a single point.
