= Xenofon Koutsioumpas =

Greek Greco-Roman wrestler

Personal information
- Full name: Xenofon Koutsioumpas
- Nationality: Greece
- Born: 1 May 1980 (age 46) Trikala, Greece
- Height: 1.92 m (6 ft 3 1/2 in)
- Weight: 120 kg (265 lb)

Sport
- Style: Greco-Roman
- Club: Atlas Mytilenes
- Coach: Sotirios Petrakis
Medal record
Men's Greco-Roman wrestling
Representing Greece
Mediterranean Games
| Gold medal – first place | 2005 Almería | 120 kg |
| Silver medal – second place | 2001 Tunis | 130 kg |
World Championships
| Bronze medal – third place | 2001 Patras | 130 kg |

Xenofon Koutsioumpas (Greek: Ξενοφών Κουτσιούμπας; born May 1, 1980, in Trikala) is an amateur Greek Greco-Roman wrestler, who competed in the men's super heavyweight category. Koutsioumpas has claimed two medals at the Mediterranean Games (2001 and 2005), a bronze in the 120-kg division at the 2001 World Wrestling Championships in Patras, and has been selected to the nation's Olympic wrestling team when Greece hosted the 2004 Summer Olympics in Athens. Throughout his sporting career, Koutsioumpas, along with his younger brother Georgios, trained as a member of the Greco-Roman wrestling team for Olympiacos F.C. in Piraeus, with whom he won the European CELA Cup in 2006. Since 2012 they have been training at Atlas Mytilenes under their head coach Sotirios Petrakis.

Koutsioumpas emerged himself into the international scene at the 2001 Mediterranean Games in Tunis, Tunisia, where he took home the silver medal in the men's 130-kg division. When Greece hosted the World Championships in Patras later that year, Koutsioumpas enchanted the home crowd in a spectacular fashion, as he beat Bulgaria's Sergei Mureiko at 8–0, and ran off the mat with a bronze medal. His sporting success continued to flourish at the next two World Championships, but he left both tournaments empty-handed with fourth- and fifth-place finishes.

When Greece welcomed the 2004 Summer Olympics in Athens, Koutsioumpas qualified as a member of the Greek squad in the men's 120 kg class, by placing fifth and receiving an automatic spot for his home nation from the 2003 World Wrestling Championships in Créteil, France. Koutsioumpas suddenly lost a 2–2 draw to Kazakh wrestler and 2003 world bronze medalist Georgiy Tsurtsumia on his opening match, but quickly rallied with and delighted the home crowd inside the Ano Liossa Olympic Hall, as he prevailed two straight matches over Sweden's Eddy Bengtsson and Georgia's Mirian Giorgadze (both at 5–0). Finishing second in the prelim pool and rounding out the top seven, Koutsioumpas missed a chance to compete for his home nation in the quarterfinal rounds.

At the 2005 Mediterranean Games in Almería, Spain, Koutsioumpas scored a stunning 7–5 to climb the summit of the podium and snatch the men's super heavyweight title in his final match against Turkish wrestler and defending champion Yekta Yılmaz Gül.
