= Mirian Giorgadze =

Georgian Greco-Roman wrestler

Personal information
- Full name: Mirian Giorgadze
- Nationality: Georgia
- Born: 25 March 1976 (age 50) Terjola, Imereti, Georgian SSR, Soviet Union
- Height: 1.84 m (6 ft 1/2 in)
- Weight: 120 kg (265 lb)

Sport
- Style: Greco-Roman
- Club: Dynamo Tbilisi
- Coach: Vasha Kraveshvili
Medal record
Men's Greco-Roman wrestling
Representing Georgia
European Championships
Bronze medal – third place	2005 Varna	120 kg

Mirian Giorgadze (Georgian: მირიან გიორგაძე; born March 25, 1976, in Terjola) is a retired amateur Georgian Greco-Roman wrestler, who competed in the men's super heavyweight category. He represented his nation Georgia in two editions of the Olympic Games (2000 and 2004), and nearly ended his sporting campaign with a blistering bronze medal effort at the 2005 European Championships in Varna, Bulgaria. Giorgadze also trained as part of the Greco-Roman wrestling team for Dynamo Tbilisi under his personal coach Vasha Kraveshvili.

Giorgadze made his official debut at the 2000 Summer Olympics in Sydney, where he competed in the men's super heavyweight division (130 kg). He lost two straight matches each to Sweden's Eddy Bengtsson and Belarus' Dmitry Debelka, who later claimed a bronze medal at the end of the tournament in the prelim pool, finishing last out of twenty wrestlers in the overall standings.

At the 2004 Summer Olympics in Athens, Giorgadze qualified for his second Georgian squad in the men's 120 kg class by receiving a berth and placing third from the Olympic Qualification Tournament in Novi Sad, Serbia and Montenegro. Since his previous Games, Giorgadze could not recover a setback from his former rival Bengtsson on the opening bout, but managed to break a 2–2 draw and score a single triumph over Kazakhstan's Georgiy Tsurtsumia. Giorgadze's devised game plan did not effectively accomplish, as he was haplessly pinned by the host nation's Xenofon Koutsioumpas and Sweden's Eddy Bengtsson without receiving a single point, finishing third in the prelim pool and fifteenth in the overall rankings.
