= Pertti Ahokas =

Finnish ice hockey player (born 1947)

- Born: August 5, 1947 (age 77); Kuopio, Finland
- Height: 6 ft 0 in (183 cm)
- Weight: 179 lb (81 kg; 12 st 11 lb)
- Position: Defence
- Played for: Jokerit; SaiPa; TuTo; TPS
- Playing career: 1966–1983

Pertti Ahokas (born August 5, 1947) is a Finnish former professional ice hockey defenceman.

Ahokas played in the SM-sarja and SM-liiga for Jokerit, SaiPa, TuTo and TPS. He played 165 games in SM-sarja between 1969 and 1975 and 235 games in SM-Liiga between 1975 and 1982.

He played a total of 400 matches in the SM-Liiga, where his stats were 49 + 63 = 112 and his ice time was 342 minutes.

He won the Finnish championship in TPS in 1976. He also achieved two SC silver and two SC bronze .
