= Laszlo Kovacs (wrestler) =

Australian wrestler

Personal information
- Nationality: Australian
- Born: 1 April 1971 (age 55) Nagykanizsa, Hungary

Sport
- Sport: Wrestling

Laszlo Kovacs (born 1 April 1971) is an Australian wrestler. He competed in the men's Greco-Roman 130 kg at the 2000 Summer Olympics, where he placed 18th.
