= Fatih Bakır =

Turkish wrestler (born 1977)

Fatih Bakir
Personal information
- Nationality: Turkish
- Born: 11 March 1977 (age 49)

Sport
- Sport: Wrestling
Medal record
Men's Greco-Roman wrestling
Representing Turkey
European Championships
Silver medal – second place	2001 Istanbul	130 kg
World University Championships
Gold medal – first place	2000 Tokyo	130 kg
European Junior Championships
Bronze medal – third place	1997 Istanbul	115 kg
Grand Prix
Bronze medal – third place	2004 Dortmund	120 kg

Fatih Bakir (born 11 March 1977) is a Turkish wrestler. He competed in the men's Greco-Roman 130 kg at the 2000 Summer Olympics.
