= Yuri Evseichik =

Amateur Israeli Greco-Roman wrestler

Yuri Evseichik יורי יבסייצ'יק
Personal information
- Full name: Yuri Evseichik
- Nationality: Israel
- Born: 23 January 1971 (age 55) Zolotonosha, Ukrainian SSR, Soviet Union
- Height: 1.89 m (6 ft 2 1/2 in)
- Weight: 120 kg (265 lb)

Sport
- Style: Greco-Roman
- Club: Maccabi Eilat
- Coach: Boris Tabachnik (1999–2003); Leonid Shulman (2003–2004)
Medal record
Men's Greco-Roman wrestling
Representing Israel
World Championships
Bronze medal – third place	1998 Gävle	130 kg

Yuri Evseichik (Hebrew: יורי יבסייצ'יק, Russian: Юрий Евсейчик; born 23 January 1971) is a retired amateur Israeli Greco-Roman wrestler, who competed in the men's super heavyweight category.

== Wrestling career ==
Considered one of the world's top Greco-Roman wrestlers in his decade, Evseitchik emerged into the international scene with his blistering bronze medal effort at the 1998 World Wrestling Championships, and later represented as part of the Israeli team in two editions of the Olympic Games (2000 and 2004). Since he emigrated to Israel at the age of 20, Evseitchik became a member of the Maccabi Eilat Club under his personal coaches Boris Tabachnik and Leonid Shulman.

Evseichik did not compete internationally until 1998, when he became the bronze medalist in the 130 kg division at the World Championships in Gävle, Sweden as part of Israel's Greco-Roman wrestling team.

Two years later, Evseichik made his official debut at the 2000 Summer Olympics in Sydney, where he competed in the men's super heavyweight division (130 kg). He managed to score a total of 11 technical points and a powerful set of three triumphs to defeat Czech Republic's David Vála, Turkey's Fatih Bakir, and Poland's Marek Sitnik to earn a spot in the knockout rounds. When Evseitchik reached the semifinals, he led U.S. wrestler Rulon Gardner in the opening bout, but began to exasperate during the match and lost his fight in overtime with a default score of 3–2. Evseitchik ended his Olympic campaign with a disheartening defeat in the bronze medal match against Belarus' Dmitry Debelka, and a fourth-place finish.

At the 2004 Summer Olympics in Athens, Evseichik qualified for the men's 120 kg class by receiving a berth and beating Sweden's Eddy Bengtsson in the third round of the Olympic Qualification Tournament in Novi Sad, Serbia and Montenegro. Unlike his previous Games, Evseitchik suffered through a surprisingly vulnerable game plan as he was haplessly pinned by Cuba's Mijaín López three times, and could not recover his form after losing out to Turkey's Yekta Yılmaz Gül on his second bout, finishing third in the prelim pool and nineteenth in the overall rankings without acquiring a single point.
