= Omrane Ayari =

Tunisian wrestler (born 1972)

Personal information
- Nationality: Tunisian
- Born: 12 April 1972 (age 54)

Sport
- Sport: Wrestling

Omrane Ayari (born 12 April 1972) is a Tunisian wrestler. He competed at the 1996 Summer Olympics and the 2000 Summer Olympics.
