= Yannick Szczepaniak =

French Greco-Roman wrestler

Personal information
- Nationality: France
- Born: 29 January 1980 (age 46) Sarreguemines, France
- Height: 1.88 m (6 ft 2 in)
- Weight: 120 kg (265 lb)

Sport
- Sport: Wrestling
- Event: Greco-Roman
- Club: ASSO Sarreguemines Lutte
- Coached by: Patrice Mourier
Medal record
Men's Greco-Roman wrestling
Representing France
Olympic Games
Bronze medal – third place	2008 Beijing	120 kg

Yannick Szczepaniak (born 29 January 1980 in Sarreguemines) is an amateur French Greco-Roman wrestler, who played for the men's super heavyweight category. He is also a two-time Olympian, a ten-time national wrestling champion, and a member of ASSO Sarreguemines Lutte, being coached and trained by Patrice Mourier.

Szczepaniak made his official debut for the 2004 Summer Olympics in Athens, where he reached the knock-out stage of the men's 120 kg, by winning the preliminary pool round against Armenia's Haykaz Galtsyan and Venezuela's Rafael Barreno. He lost the quarterfinal match to Iran's Sajjad Barzi, with a final score of 0–3.

At the 2008 Summer Olympics in Beijing, Szczepaniak competed for the second time in the men's 120 kg class. He defeated Bulgaria's Ivan Ivanov, and three-time Olympian Mihály Deák-Bárdos of Hungary in the preliminary rounds, before losing out the semi-final match to defending Olympic champion Khasan Baroev of Russia, with a score of 2–3. Because his opponent advanced further into the final match, Szczepaniak automatically qualified for the bronze medal bout, where he was defeated by Lithuania's Mindaugas Mizgaitis, with a technical score of 2–4.

Following the disqualification of Khasan Baroyev, he was reinstated as bronze medalist in November 2016.
