= David Vála =

Czech Greco-Roman wrestler

Personal information
- Full name: David Vála
- Nationality: Czech Republic
- Born: 17 April 1978 (age 48) Liberec, Czechoslovakia
- Height: 1.91 m (6 ft 3 in)
- Weight: 115 kg (254 lb)

Sport
- Style: Greco-Roman
- Club: PSK Olymp Praha
- Coach: Ervin Varga
Medal record
Men's Greco-Roman wrestling
Representing Czech Republic
European Championships
Silver medal – second place	2007 Moscow	120 kg

David Vála (born 17 April 1978 in Liberec) is an amateur Czech Greco-Roman wrestler, who competed in the men's heavyweight category. He won a silver medal in his division at the 2007 European Wrestling Championships in Moscow, Russia, losing out to Russian wrestler and former Olympic champion Khasan Baroyev. Vala is also a three-time Olympian (2000, 2004 and 2012), and a member of the wrestling team for PSK Olymp Praha under his personal coach Ervin Varga.

Vala made his debut at the 2000 Summer Olympics in Sydney, where he competed in the men's super heavyweight division (130 kg). He placed third in a four-person preliminary pool against Israel's Yuri Evseitchik, Turkey's Fatih Bakir, and Poland's Marek Sitnik, accumulating a score of five technical and four classification points.

At the 2004 Summer Olympics in Athens, Vala finished second in the preliminary pool round of the men's 120 kg class, against Baroyev and Belarus' Andrei Chekhauskoi, with a total score of three technical and classification points each.

Eight years after competing in his last Olympics, Vala qualified for his third Czech team, at the age of 34, for the 2012 Summer Olympics in London, by placing second in the men's heavyweight division in the Olympic Qualification Tournament in Helsinki, Finland. He received a bye for the preliminary round of sixteen match in the men's 96 kg class, before losing out to Cuban wrestler and Pan American Games champion Yunior Estrada, with a three-set technical score (0–1, 1–0, 0–1), and a classification point score of 1–3.
