= Rulon Gardner =

American wrestler (born 1971)

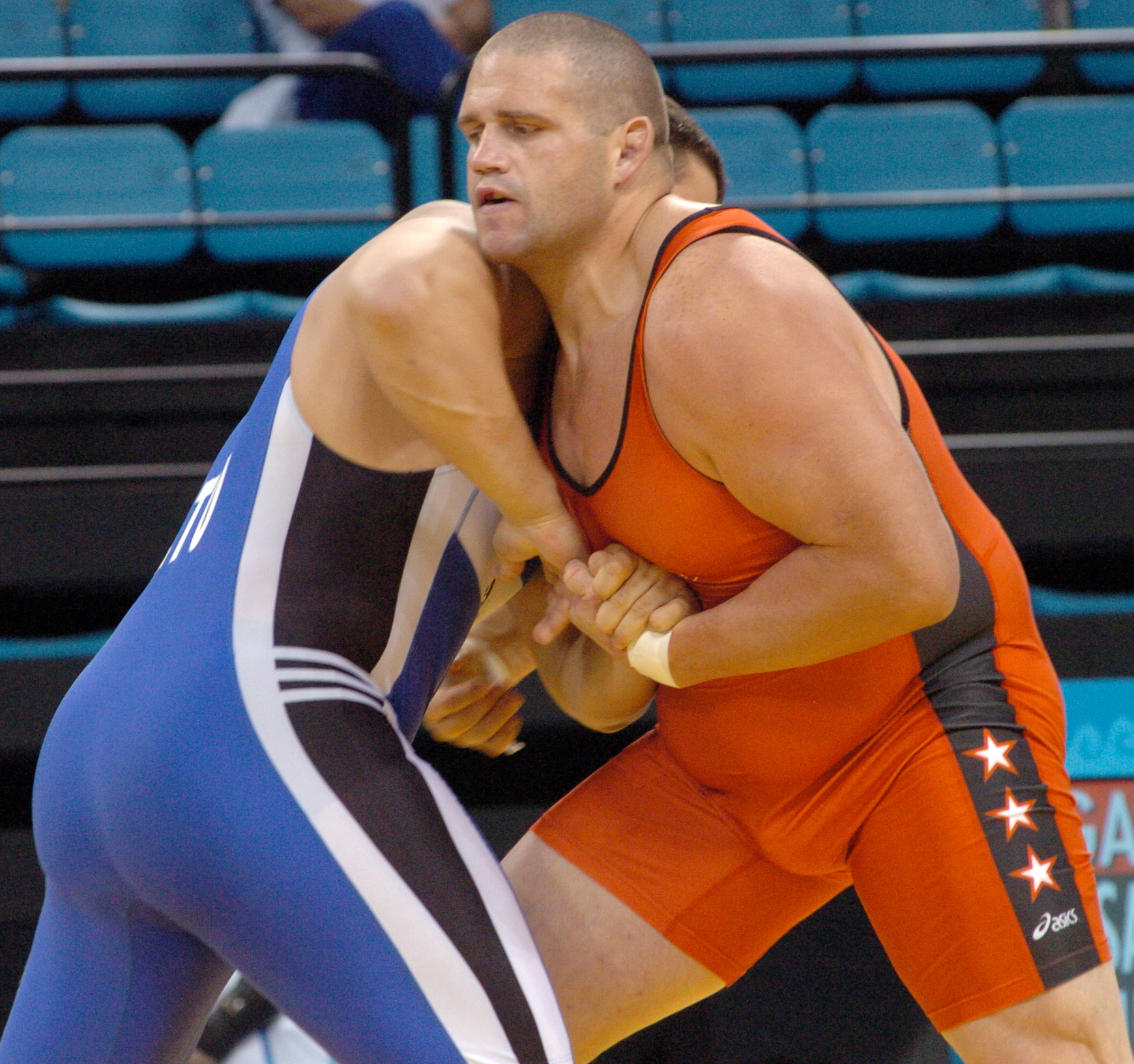
- Gardner (right) at the 2004 Olympics

Personal information
- Full name: Rulon Ellis Gardner
- Born: August 16, 1971 (age 55) Afton, Wyoming, U.S.
- Height: 6 ft 2 in (188 cm)
- Weight: 130 kg (287 lb); 120 kg (265 lb)

Sport
- Sport: Wrestling
- Event: Greco-Roman
- College team: Nebraska
- Club: Sunkist Kids Wrestling Club
- Coached by: Robert Christensen; Anatoly Petrosyan; Steve Fraser
Medal record
Men's Greco-Roman wrestling
Representing the United States
Olympic Games
Gold medal – first place	2000 Sydney	130 kg
Bronze medal – third place	2004 Athens	120 kg
World Championships
Gold medal – first place	2001 Patras	130 kg
Pan American Games
Silver medal – second place	2003 Santo Domingo	120 kg
Pan American Championships
Gold medal – first place	1998 Winnipeg	130 kg
Gold medal – first place	2000 Cali	130 kg
Silver medal – second place	1997 San Juan	125 kg

Rulon Ellis Gardner (born August 16, 1971) is an American retired Greco-Roman wrestler. He won the gold medal at the 2000 Olympic Games, defeating Russia's three-time reigning Olympic gold medalist Aleksandr Karelin in the final; Karelin was previously unbeaten for 13 years in international competition. Gardner won a bronze medal at the 2004 Games. In 2010, he was inducted into the National Wrestling Hall of Fame as a Distinguished Member.

== Personal background ==
Gardner was born in Afton, Wyoming. He is the son of Reed and Virginia Gardner and the last of nine children. His second great-grandfather was Archibald Gardner, who was one of the early settlers of Star Valley, Wyoming. He attributes his strength to the physical labor that he performed growing up and working on the family's dairy farm.

In 2005, Gardner published his autobiography (co-written by Bob Schaller), Never Stop Pushing: My Life from a Wyoming Farm to the Olympic Medals Stand, in which he describes his Greco-Roman wrestling career, his academic struggles (as one who has a learning disability), and his near-death experience when stranded after a snowmobile accident that cost him a toe to frostbite.

As of 2011, Gardner worked as a motivational speaker, often appearing as a keynote presenter and event host. He has appeared at corporate events, celebrity golf tournaments, trade shows, and conventions. He also has licensing deals, as well as print and television endorsements.

In 2012, Gardner and his wife Kami filed for Chapter 7 Bankruptcy in a Salt Lake City Federal court, with $2.9 million in liabilities.

After the Athens Olympics, Gardner gained 210 pounds, culminating in a total body weight of 474 pounds. In January 2011, he was announced as a contestant on season 11 of the American reality television show, The Biggest Loser. After 16 weeks on the show, Gardner had lost 173 pounds. Gardner shocked the trainers, staff, and contestants on the April 26 episode by announcing he would be leaving the show "for personal reasons", and left the show without a final weigh-in. He did not appear on the final episode of the season, except in the background of scenes of other contestants.

=== Injuries ===
When Gardner was in elementary school, he was injured during a class show-and-tell, when his abdomen was punctured with an arrow.

In 2002, Gardner went snowmobiling with some friends in the mountains surrounding Star Valley, Wyoming. At one point, he became separated from the group. During his efforts to regain his composure and regroup, he fell into the freezing Salt River with his snowmobile. Unable to move any farther, Gardner decided to build a shelter and wait for a rescue team. He remained stranded for the next 18 hours. After several hours in his makeshift shelter, he stopped shivering, which led him to believe that he was dying. When he was eventually rescued, he was experiencing hypothermia and severe frostbite. Because of the physical damage, a saw had to be used to remove his boots. The harrowing experience cost Gardner the middle toe on his right foot, which he keeps in formaldehyde in a jar in his refrigerator, to remind him of his mortality. He told his story on a first-season episode of I Survived....

On February 24, 2007, Gardner and two other men survived a crash when a light aircraft he was traveling in crashed into Lake Powell, Utah. The men swam an hour in 44 °F (7 °C) water to reach shore, and then spent the night without shelter. None of the three sustained life-threatening injuries.

== Educational background ==
Gardner attended Star Valley High School in Afton, Wyoming. He was a three-sport letter winner in football, wrestling, and track and field. He was an All-State selection in both football and wrestling, and was the 1989 Wyoming heavyweight wrestling state champion. In track and field, as a senior, he took second at the state championships in the shot put.

Gardner attended junior college at Ricks College (now BYU-Idaho) in Rexburg, Idaho, and as a sophomore, won the NJCAA national heavyweight wrestling championship. He and his first wife Sheri lost their daughter, Stacey in a terrible car accident on December 26, 1990. He then earned a scholarship to attend the University of Nebraska–Lincoln. While at Nebraska, Gardner finished fourth in the 275-pound weight class at the 1993 NCAA Division I Championships, earning All-American honors.

He graduated from the University of Nebraska–Lincoln with a bachelor's degree in physical education. He attended both Ricks College and the University of Nebraska–Lincoln on wrestling scholarships.

== Wrestling career ==
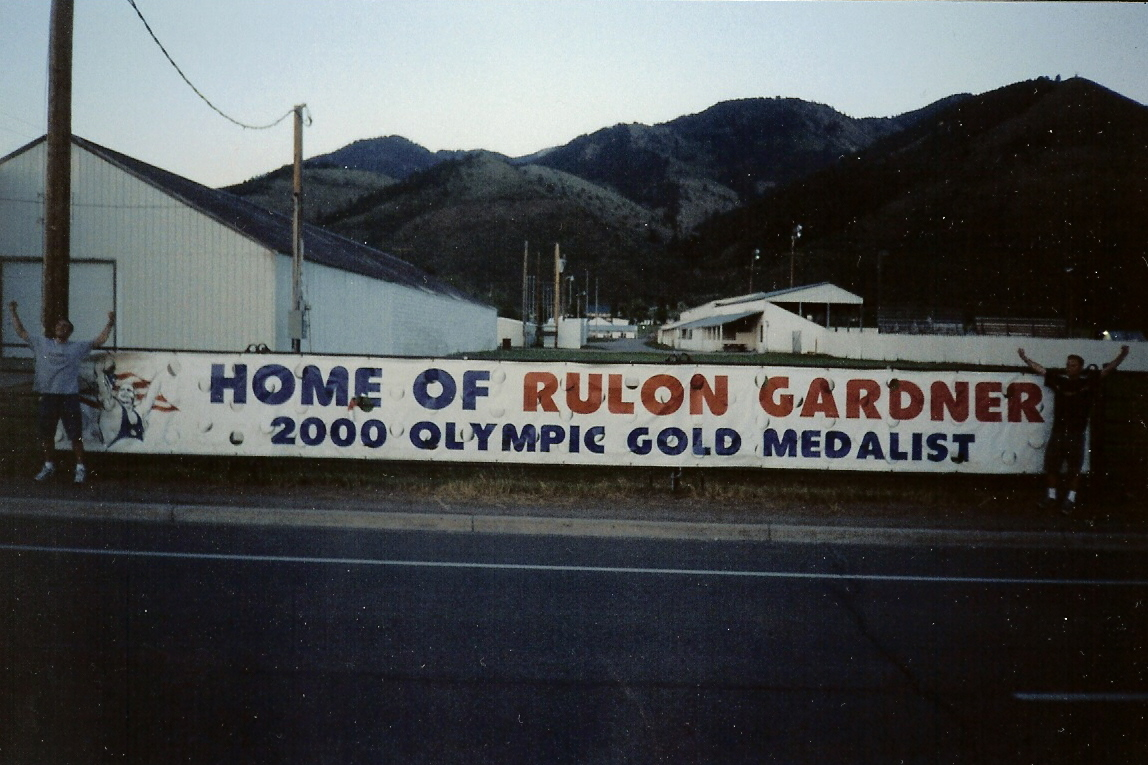
Gardner's win over Russian Alexander Karelin "shocked the wrestling world." After defeating Karelin, who was previously undefeated in 13 years, he became a local hero in his hometown of Afton, Wyoming.

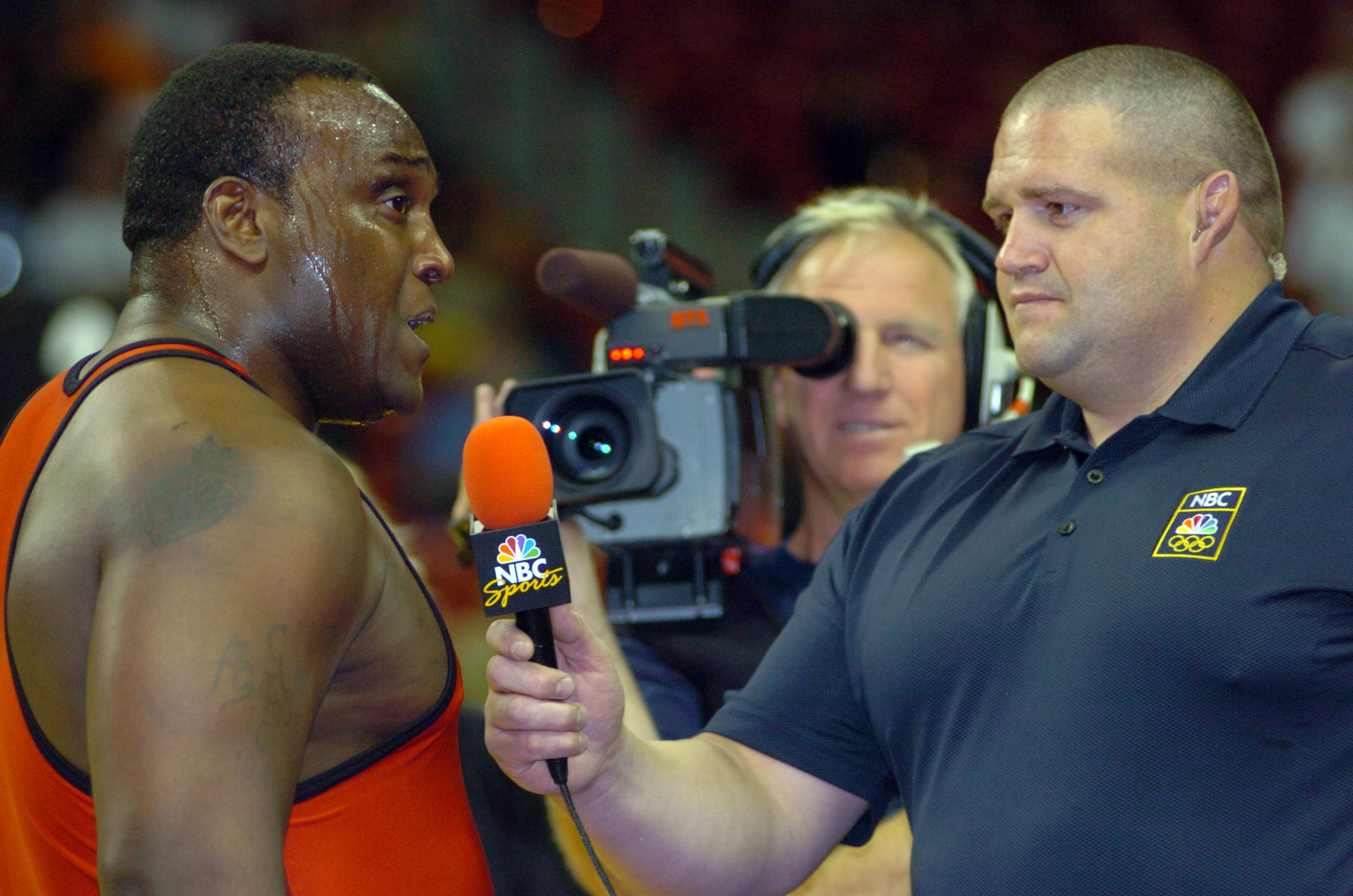
Gardner (right) interviews Dremiel Byers in 2008, working as an analyst for NBC Sports.

=== Olympics ===
Gardner is known for his defeat of three-time reigning gold medalist Aleksandr Karelin at the 2000 Summer Olympics. Karelin had been undefeated for 13 years, and had not given up a point in six years, prior to his loss in the gold medal match to Gardner. Karelin had won the previous match against Gardner in 1997, with a score of 5–0. Odds for Gardner had him as a 2000 to 1 underdog against Karelin. It is widely considered one of the biggest upsets ever in sports.

In 2001, Gardner added a World Championship to his list of accomplishments with a victory in the finals over Mihály Deák-Bárdos of Hungary. His win made him the only American to ever win both a World and Olympic title in Greco-Roman wrestling.

After the 2000 Olympics he suffered a series of injuries from both a snowmobiling and motorcycle accident. These injuries included an amputated toe and a dislocated wrist, but he still went on to win the U.S. Olympic trials for his weight class and then to compete in the 2004 Summer Olympics. He was unable to repeat his 2000 performance, coming away with the Bronze medal, and after his match, he placed his shoes in the middle of the mat as a symbol of retirement from competitive wrestling.

Gardner competed once in mixed martial arts, and in 2004 he became the host for a professional wrestling league called Real Pro Wrestling.

Gardner served as an analyst for NBC Sports coverage of Wrestling at the 2008 Summer Olympics.

Gardner attempted a comeback for the 2012 Olympics but was unable to make the 264.5 pound max weight limit for the U.S. Olympic Trials and therefore ineligible to compete for a position on the Olympic team.

=== Mixed martial arts ===
On December 31, 2004, Gardner fought Hidehiko Yoshida in a judo vs wrestling mixed martial arts (MMA) bout for the Pride Fighting Championships at an event named PRIDE Shockwave 2004. Yoshida, in addition to being an Olympic gold medalist in judo, was a highly successful MMA fighter. Gardner, trained by Randy Couture at Team Quest, won the bout via unanimous decision.

Rulon Gardner mixed martial arts record
Date	Result	Record	Opponent	Event	Method	Round, Time
December 31, 2004	Win	1–0	(Japan) Hidehiko Yoshida	PRIDE Shockwave 2004	Decision (Unanimous)	Round 3, 5:00

== Honors and awards ==
Aside from his Olympic medals, his achievements include:

- U.S. Champion in 1995, 1997, and 2001
- World Champion in 2001
- James E. Sullivan Award for amateur athlete of the year, 2001
- Jesse Owens Award, 2001
- United States Olympic Committee Sportsman of the Year, 2001
- ESPY award for U.S. Male Olympic athlete of the year, 2001
- Inducted as a Distinguished Member of the National Wrestling Hall of Fame, 2010

== Published works ==
- Gardner, Rulon and Bob Schaller (2005). Never Stop Pushing: My Life from a Wyoming Farm to the Olympic Medals Stand, Da Capo Press. ISBN 978-0-7867-1593-0
