= Shermukhammad Kuziev =

Uzbekistani wrestler (born 1971)

Personal information
- Nationality: Uzbekistani
- Born: 23 May 1971 (age 55)

Sport
- Sport: Wrestling

Shermukhammad Kuziev (born 23 May 1971) is an Uzbekistani wrestler. He competed in the men's Greco-Roman 130 kg at the 1996 Summer Olympics. He was affiliated with CSKA Tashkent.
