= Haykaz Galstyan =

Armenian Greco-Roman wrestler

Personal information
- Born: 18 October 1977 (age 48) Echmiadzin, Armenian SSR, Soviet Union
- Height: 1.90 m (6 ft 3 in)
- Weight: 130 kg (290 lb)

Sport
- Sport: Wrestling
- Event: Greco-Roman
- Club: Arsen Ivanyan Redshiatsin
- Coached by: Levan Shagoyan

Haykaz Galstyan (Armenian: Հայկազ Գալստյան, born 18 October 1977) is an Armenian Greco-Roman wrestler. He competed at the 2000 Summer Olympics and 2004 Summer Olympics in the men's 130 kg division and men's 120 kg division, coming in 13th and 9th place, respectively. Galstyan was also the flag bearer for Armenia at the 2000 Olympics and is the second Olympian to bear the flag of Armenia at the Summer Olympics.
