= Giuseppe Giunta =

Italian wrestler

Personal information
- Nationality: Italian
- Born: 12 January 1973 (age 53) Catania, Italy

Sport
- Sport: Wrestling

Giuseppe Giunta (born 12 January 1973) is an Italian wrestler. He competed at the 1996 Summer Olympics and the 2000 Summer Olympics.
