= Héctor Milián =

Cuban wrestler (born 1968)

Personal information
- Born: 14 May 1968 (age 58) Pinar del Río, Cuba

Sport
- Sport: Greco-Roman wrestling
Medal record
Representing Cuba
Men's Greco-Roman wrestling
Olympic Games
Gold medal – first place	1992 Barcelona	100 kg
World Championships
Gold medal – first place	1991 Varna	100 kg
Silver medal – second place	1994 Tampere	130 kg
Silver medal – second place	1995 Prague	100 kg
Bronze medal – third place	1997 Wroclaw	130 kg
Silver medal – second place	1999 Athens	130 kg
World Cup
Bronze medal – third place	1987 Albany	100 kg
Gold medal – first place	1988 Athens	100 kg
Gold medal – first place	1989 Frederikstad	100 kg
Gold medal – first place	1990 Gothenburg	100 kg
Gold medal – first place	1992 Besançon	100 kg
Silver medal – second place	1995 Schifferstadt	130 kg
Silver medal – second place	1996 Colorado Springs	130 kg
Pan American Games
Gold medal – first place	1987 Indianapolis	100 kg
Gold medal – first place	1991 Havana	100 kg
Gold medal – first place	1995 Mar del Plata	100 kg
Gold medal – first place	1999 Winnipeg	130 kg
Pan American Championships
Silver medal – second place	1986 Colorado Springs	100 kg
Gold medal – first place	1987 Indianapolis	100 kg
Gold medal – first place	1988 Mexico City	100 kg
Gold medal – first place	1989 Colorado Springs	100 kg
Gold medal – first place	1990 Colorado Springs	100 kg
Gold medal – first place	1991 Havana	100 kg
Gold medal – first place	1992 Albany	100 kg
Gold medal – first place	1993 Guatemala City	100 kg
Gold medal – first place	1997 San Juan	125 kg
Silver medal – second place	1998 Winnipeg	130 kg
Silver medal – second place	2000 Cali	130 kg
Gold medal – first place	2001 Santo Domingo	130 kg
Junior World Championships
Gold medal – first place	1986 Schifferstadt	130 kg

Héctor Milián Pérez (born 14 May 1968) is a Cuban wrestler. He won an Olympic gold medal in Greco-Roman wrestling in 1992. He won a gold medal at the 1991 World Wrestling Championships.
