= Georgiy Saldadze =

Ukrainian wrestler (born 1973)

Personal information
- Nationality: Ukrainian
- Born: 21 March 1973 (age 53) Kutaisi, Georgian SSR, Soviet Union

Sport
- Sport: Wrestling
Medal record
Men's Greco-Roman wrestling
Representing Ukraine
World Championships
Bronze medal – third place	1994 Tampere	100 kg
Bronze medal – third place	1995 Prague	100 kg
European Championships
Silver medal – second place	1995 Besançon	100 kg
Silver medal – second place	1998 Minsk	100 kg
Bronze medal – third place	1994 Athens	100 kg
Military World Games
Bronze medal – third place	1995 Rome	100+ kg

Georgiy Saldadze (born 21 March 1973) is a Ukrainian wrestler. He competed at the 1996 Summer Olympics and the 2000 Summer Olympics. He was affiliated with CSKA Kutaisi and is the brother of Davyd Saldadze.
