= Juha Ahokas =

Finnish Greco-Roman wrestler

Personal information
- Full name: Juha Matti Ahokas
- Nickname: Nalle
- Nationality: Finland
- Born: 18 September 1969 (age 56) Kokkola, Finland
- Height: 1.89 m (6 ft 2 1/2 in)
- Weight: 128 kg (282 lb)

Sport
- Style: Greco-Roman
- Club: Nurmon Jymy
- Coach: Risto Ahokas
Medal record
Men's Greco-Roman wrestling
Representing Finland
World Cup
Gold medal – first place	Heinola 1993	130 kg
European Championships
Gold medal – first place	2003 Belgrade	120 kg
Silver medal – second place	1997 Kouvola	125 kg
Silver medal – second place	2006 Moscow	130 kg
Bronze medal – third place	2002 Seinäjoki	130 kg

Juha Matti Ahokas (born September 18, 1969, in Kokkola) is a retired amateur Finnish Greco-Roman wrestler, who competed in the men's super heavyweight category. He has won thirty Finnish championship titles, collected four medals (one gold, two silver, and one bronze) at the European Championships, and also represented his nation Finland in four editions of the Olympic Games (1988, 1992, 1996, and 2004). Throughout his sporting career, Ahokas trained for Nurmon Jymy Wrestling Club in Seinäjoki under his father and personal coach Risto Ahokas.

Ahokas made his official debut, as an 18-year-old teen, at the 1988 Summer Olympics in Seoul, where he lost the second round of the elimination pool to U.S. wrestler Dennis Koslowski in the men's heavyweight division. Four years later, at the 1992 Summer Olympics in Barcelona, Ahokas competed in the super heavyweight category (130 kg) and slammed Greece's Panagiotis Poikilidis off the mat with a 1–0 sudden death lead to finish strongly in seventh.

Determined to return to the Olympic scene and medal, Ahokas entered the 1996 Summer Olympics in Atlanta as a top medal favorite in the men's 130 kg class. He beat Sweden's Tomas Johansson in his opening match, but suffered a tremendous fall from the unbeatable Russian and reigning Olympic champion Aleksandr Karelin in the third round. Facing off against Ukraine's Petro Kotok in the fourth repechage, Ahokas could not score a single point to subdue his opponent and lost the match with a fourteenth-place finish.

Despite a stunning upset from his third Games, Ahokas took home his first medal at the 1997 European Championships in Kouvola, and continued to flourish his sporting success in the late 1990s and early 2000s, until he wrestled Hungary's Mihály Deák-Bárdos for the gold in the 120-kg division at the 2003 European Championships in Belgrade, Serbia and Montenegro.

Eight years after his last Olympics and having missed the previous Games due to back injury, Ahokas qualified for the Finnish squad, as a 34-year-old veteran, in the men's 120 kg class at the 2004 Summer Olympics in Athens. Earlier in the process, he received a ticket and rounded out the seventh spot from the 2003 World Wrestling Championships in Créteil, France. Aged and frail, Ahokas lost two straight matches to his former rival Deák-Bárdos (0–3) and Iran's Sajjad Barzi through a 1–2 tight brawl in the prelim pool, finishing only in seventeenth place out of twenty super heavyweight wrestlers.

Ahokas ended his illustrious sporting career with another silver medal at the 2006 European Championships in Moscow, before he officially retired by the following year due to spinal and shoulder injuries sustained in the past.
