= Helger Hallik =

Estonian wrestler (born 1972)

Personal information
- Nationality: Estonia
- Born: 26 November 1972 (age 53) Tartu, then part of Estonian SSR, Soviet Union
- Height: 1.87 m (6 ft 1 1/2 in)
- Weight: 120 kg (265 lb)

Sport
- Country: Estonia
- Sport: Wrestling
- Event: Greco-Roman
- Club: SK Englas
- Coached by: Voldemar Press

Achievements and titles
- National finals: 12
- Highest world ranking: 5

Helger Hallik (born 26 November 1972) is a former Estonian wrestler who competed in the 1992 Summer Olympics, 1996 Summer Olympics and in the 2000 Summer Olympics.
