= Dmitry Debelka =

Belarusian Greco-Roman wrestler (1976–2022)

Personal information
- Born: 7 January 1976 Minsk, Byelorussian SSR, Soviet Union
- Died: 24 February 2022 (aged 46)
- Height: 1.90 m (6 ft 3 in)
- Weight: 130 kg (290 lb)

Sport
- Sport: Sport wrestling
Medal record
Men's Greco-Roman wrestling
Representing Belarus
Olympic Games
Bronze medal – third place	2000 Sydney	130 kg

Dmitry Vladimirovich Debelka (Belarusian: Дзмітрый (Зьміцер) Уладзіміравіч Дзябёлка; 7 January 1976 – February 2022) was a Belarusian wrestler who competed in the Men's Greco-Roman 130 kg at the 2000 Summer Olympics and won the bronze medal.

Debelka died on 24 February 2022, at the age of 46.
