= Georgiy Tsurtsumia =

Kazakhstani Greco-Roman wrestler (born 1980)

Medal record

Men's Greco-Roman wrestling

Representing Kazakhstan

Olympic Games
Silver medal – second place	2004 Athens	120 kg

Georgi Tsurtsumia (Georgian: გიორგი წურწუმია;; born October 29, 1980, in Tsalenjikha, Georgian SSR) is a Kazakhstani wrestler who competed in the Men's Greco-Roman 120 kg at the 2004 Summer Olympics and won the silver medal.
