= Sergei Mureiko =

Moldavan Greco-Roman wrestler

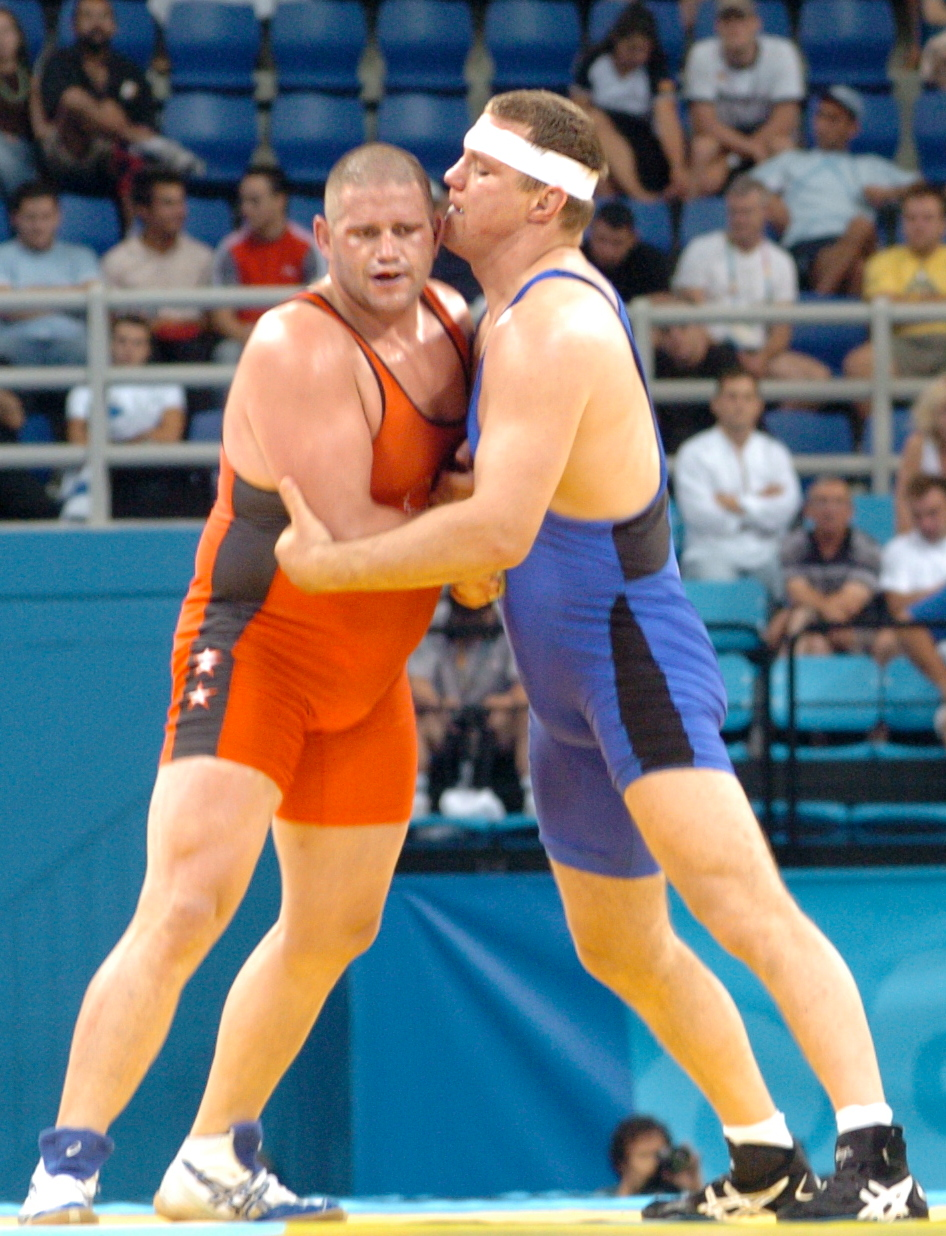
- Mureiko (right) at the 2004 Olympics

Personal information
- Born: 2 July 1970 (age 56) Chișinău, Moldovian SSR, Soviet Union
- Height: 195 cm (6 ft 5 in)
- Weight: 125 kg (276 lb)

Sport
- Sport: Greco-Roman wrestling
- Club: Slavia Sofia
Medal record
Men's Greco-Roman wrestling
Representing Moldova
Olympic Games
| Bronze medal – third place | 1996 Atlanta | 130 kg |
World Championships
| Silver medal – second place | 1993 Stockholm | 130 kg |
| Silver medal – second place | 1995 Prague | 130 kg |
European Championships
| Bronze medal – third place | 1993 Istanbul | 130 kg |
| Bronze medal – third place | 1995 Besançon | 130 kg |
| Bronze medal – third place | 1996 Budapest | 130 kg |
Representing Bulgaria
World Championships
| Bronze medal – third place | 1999 Atlanta | 130 kg |
European Championships
| Gold medal – first place | 1997 Kouvola | 125 kg |
| Silver medal – second place | 2000 Moscow | 130 kg |
| Bronze medal – third place | 1998 Minsk | 130 kg |
| Bronze medal – third place | 2001 Istanbul | 130 kg |
| Bronze medal – third place | 2004 Ankara | 130 kg |

Sergei Mureiko (born 2 July 1970) is a retired heavyweight Greco-Roman wrestler, who until 1996 represented Moldova and then Bulgaria. He competed in the 1996, 2000 and 2004 Olympics and won a bronze medal in 1996. Between 1993 and 2004 he won 11 medals at the world and European championships, often losing to his main rival Aleksandr Karelin. He won his only international title in 1997, in the absence of Karelin. Karelin considered Mureiko one of his most difficult opponents.
