= Eddy Bengtsson =

Swedish Olympic wrestler and MMA fighter

- Born: April 30, 1979 (age 47); Gothenburg, Sweden
- Nationality: Swedish
- Height: 6 ft 4 in (193 cm)
- Weight: 265 lb (120 kg; 18 st 13 lb)
- Division: Heavyweight
- Style: Greco-Roman wrestling
- Stance: Orthodox
- Fighting out of: Stockholm, Sweden
- Team: GBG MMA
- Rank: Olympian in Greco-Roman Wrestling
- Years active: 2008–present

Mixed martial arts record
- Total: 10
- Wins: 6
- By knockout: 2
- By submission: 4
- Losses: 4
- By knockout: 3
- By submission: 1

Other information
- Mixed martial arts record from Sherdog

Eddy Bengtsson (born April 30, 1979, in Gothenburg) is a Swedish retired wrestler who competed in the Men's Greco-Roman 120 kg at the 2004 Summer Olympics and 2000 Summer Olympics. Bengtsson retired from wrestling and competed in many grappling tournaments, and in mixed martial arts. On April 23, 2010, he faced Alexander Emelianenko for the Russian-based Pro FC mixed martial arts organization losing by KO in the opening round. Bengtsson made a brief comeback as a wrestler to try to reach the 2012 Summer Olympics but failed. On May 10, 2012, he officially announced his retirement as a wrestler. He is an honorary member of the Scandinavian Hammers.

== Mixed martial arts record ==
Professional record breakdown
10 matches	6 wins	4 losses
By knockout	2	3
By submission	4	1
By decision	0	0

Res.	Record	Opponent	Method	Event	Date	Round	Time	Location	Notes
Loss	6–4	Dmitry Poberezhets	KO (punch)	The Zone FC 11 - Survival	November 10, 2012	1	N/A	Gothenburg, Sweden, Sweden	
Win	6–3	Jay Mortimore	Submission (smother choke)	Cage Warriors Fight Night 6	May 24, 2012	1	2:46	Isa Town, Bahrain	
Win	5–3	Vasili Kachan	Submission (guillotine choke)	The Zone FC: Demolition	May 6, 2012	1	0:33	Gothenburg, Sweden	
Loss	4–3	Dave Keeley	KO (elbows)	Cage Warriors: 45	February 18, 2012	1	4.40	London, England	
Win	4–2	Istvan Kalmar	Submission (kimura)	The Zone FC: Unbreakable	May 7, 2011	1	0:50	Gothenburg, Sweden	
Loss	3–2	Alexander Emelianenko	KO (punch)	ProFC - Commonwealth Cup 2010	April 23, 2010	1	0:40	Moscow, Russia	
Loss	3–1	Alexey Oleynik	Submission (strikes)	IAFC Mayor's Cup 2009	Nov 27, 2009	2	2:20	Novosibirsk, Russia	
Win	3–0	Ivaylo Markov	Submission (keylock)	The Zone FC - Dynamite	Nov 7, 2009	1	1:58	Gothenburg, Sweden	
Win	2–0	Vladimir Kuchenko	TKO (punches)	The Zone FC - Dynamite	April 25, 2009	1	3:17	Gothenburg, Sweden	
Win	1–0	Andy Hillhouse	TKO (punches)	The Zone FC: Shockwave	Nov 8, 2008	1	1:20	Gothenburg, Sweden	

== See also ==
- List of male mixed martial artists
