= Deaths in February 1997 =

The following is a list of notable deaths in February 1997.

Entries for each day are listed alphabetically by surname. A typical entry lists information in the following sequence:

- Name, age, country of citizenship at birth, subsequent country of citizenship (if applicable), reason for notability, cause of death (if known), and reference.

== February 1997 ==
=== 1 ===
- Simion Bughici, 82, Romanian politician.
- Herb Caen, 80, American journalist and columnist for the San Francisco Chronicle, lung cancer.
- Heiner Carow, 67, German film director and screenwriter.
- Ed Danowski, 85, American football player (New York Giants).
- Mitchell Goodman, 73, American writer, teacher, and activist.
- William Kintner, 81, American soldier, foreign policy analyst, and diplomat.
- Kiki Kogelnik, 62, Austrian painter, sculptor and printmaker, cancer.
- Thelma Moss, 79, American actress, psychologist and parapsychologist.
- Lillian Porter, 79, American film and television actress.
- Marjorie Reynolds, 79, American actress and dancer, heart failure.
- Bo Russell, 81, American gridiron football player (Washington Redskins).
- Francisco Tobar García, 68, Ecuadorian poet, playwright, journalist, and diplomat, lung cancer.
- Wilcomb E. Washburn, American historian, prostate cancer.

=== 2 ===
- Godfrey Baseley, 92, British radio executive.
- Raúl de Anda, 88, Mexican actor, screenwriter, film producer and director.
- Erich Eliskases, 83, Austrian-Argentinian chess grandmaster.
- Karsten Johannesen, 77, Norwegian footballer.
- Qin Jiwei, 82, Chinese general and member of the Politburo.
- Sanford Meisner, 91, American actor and acting teacher.
- Art Merewether, 94, American baseball player (Pittsburgh Pirates).
- Martin Mussgnug, 60, German politician.
- Raimundo Saporta, 70, Spanish club basketball administrator.
- Chico Science, 30, Brazilian singer and composer, traffic collision.
- Theodoros Stamos, 74, Greek-American painter.
- Seán Ó Síocháin, 82, Irish Gaelic footballer, hurler, and broadcaster.

=== 3 ===
- Boris de Rachewiltz, 70, Italian-Russian egyptologist and writer.
- Jerry Beit haLevi, 84, Israeli football player and manager.
- Bohumil Hrabal, 82, Czech writer, fall.
- Agi Jambor, 87, Hungarian-born American pianist.
- Stan Kostka, 84, American football player (Brooklyn Dodgers), and coach.
- Harry H. Wachtel, 79, American lawyer and civil rights activist, Parkinson's disease.
- Mikhail Yakushin, 86, Russian football player and manager.
- Jun'ichi Yoda, 91, Japanese poet.
- Mario Zucchini, 86, Italian Olympic ice hockey player (1936).

=== 4 ===
- Henry H. Barschall, 81, German-American physicist.
- Robert Clouse, 68, American film director and producer (Enter the Dragon), kidney failure.
- Artie Combes, 83, Australian cricketer.
- Benjamin David de Jesus, 56, Philippine prelate of the Catholic Church, shot.
- Ross Lee Finney, 90, American composer.
- Paulo Francis, 66, Brazilian journalist, novelist and critic, heart attack.
- Robi Ghosh, 65, Indian actor.
- A R Mallick, 78, Bangladeshi historian and educationist.
- Alek Rapoport, 63, Russian nonconformist artist.
- Davide Sorrenti, 20, Italian-American photographer.
- James Tattersall, 56, British tennis player.
- Cyril Toumanoff, 83, Russian-American historian.
- Darrell Tully, 79, American football player (Detroit Lions), and coach.
- Leandy Young, 87, American baseball player.

=== 5 ===
- Frederick J. Almgren, Jr., 63, American mathematician, complication following surgery.
- Bob Brown, 58, Canadian professional wrestler ("Bulldog" Bob Brown).
- Robert Elem, 69, American blues guitarist and singer.
- Dorothy Fosdick, 83, American foreign policy expert.
- Pamela Harriman, 76, English-American political activist, diplomat, and socialite, cerebral hemorrhage.
- Oren Harris, 93, American politician and district judge.
- René Huyghe, 90, French art historian.
- Jürgen Neukirch, 59, German mathematician.
- Harry Trotsek, 84, American Thoroughbred racehorses trainer and owner.

=== 6 ===
- Ernie Anderson, 73, American disc jockey, and television and radio announcer, cancer.
- Harry Essex, 86, American screenwriter and director.
- Roger Laurent, 83, Belgian racing driver.
- Riza Lushta, 81, Kosovar Albanian football striker.
- Amby Murray, 83, American baseball player (Boston Bees).
- Cliff Thompson, 78, American ice hockey player (Boston Bruins).

=== 7 ===
- Nina Albright, 89, American comic book artist.
- Owen Aspinall, 69, American politician and Governor of American Samoa.
- John Baker, 59, British musician and composer.
- Sam DeCavalcante, 84, American mobster, heart attack.
- Allan Edwall, 72, Swedish actor, author, composer and singer, prostate cancer.
- Gérard Higny, 65, Belgian rower and Olympian (1960, 1964).
- Maynard Pirsig, 95, American legal scholar.
- Manny Salvo, 84, American baseball player (New York Giants, Boston Bees/Braves, Philadelphia Phillies).
- Daniil Shafran, 74, Soviet/Russian cellist.
- Rösli Streiff, 96, Swiss alpine skier and world champion.
- Jose Garcia Villa, 88, Filipino poet, novelist, and painter.
- Jim Walkup, 87, American baseball player (St. Louis Browns, Detroit Tigers).
- Mary Wills, 82, American costume designer, kidney failure.

=== 8 ===
- Nathan Lerner, 83, American photographer.
- Henry Margenau, 95, German-American physicist and philosopher of science.
- Robert Ridgely, 65, American actor (Philadelphia, Beverly Hills Cop II, Blazing Saddles), cancer.
- Corey Scott, 28, American motorcycle stunt rider, traffic collision.
- Michael Voslenski, 76, Soviet and Russian writer, scientist, diplomat and dissident.
- Hal Warnock, 85, American baseball player (St. Louis Browns).
- Walter Wiora, 90, German musicologist and music historian.

=== 9 ===
- David Austick, 76, British politician and bookshop owner.
- Taylor Drysdale, 83, American swimmer, swimming coach and Olympian (1936).
- Barry Evans, 53, English actor.
- Fritz Grasshoff, 83, German painter, poet and songwriter.
- Leni Junker, 91, German sprint runner and Olympian (1928).
- Mikhail Lavrov, 69, Soviet Russian Olympic racewalker (1956).
- Jack Owens, 92, American blues singer and guitarist.
- Williams Sassine, 53, Guinean novelist.
- Max Tetley, 87, Australian rules footballer.
- Luis Velásquez, 77, Guatemalan long-distance runner and Olympian (1952).

=== 10 ===
- Harriet Andreassen, 71, Norwegian labour activist and politician.
- Conrad M. Arensberg, 86, American anthropologist and scholar, respiratory failure.
- Lou Bennett, 70, American jazz organist.
- Milton Cato, 81, Saint Vincentian politician and first Prime Minister of Saint Vincent and the Grenadines.
- Brian Connolly, 51, Scottish singer-songwriter, musician and actor.
- Jan Kramer, 83, Dutch Olympic rower (1936).
- Robert Mallary, 79, American sculptor and computer art pioneer, leukemia.
- Ted McCarthy, 85, Australian rules footballer.
- Jerome Namias, 86, American meteorologist.
- Olaf Strand, 98, Norwegian middle-distance runner and Olympian (1928).
- Tadeusz Trojanowski, 64, Polish Olympic wrestler (1960).

=== 11 ===
- Nalanda Ellawala, 29, Sri Lankan politician, shot.
- Robert A. Graham, 84, American Jesuit priest and historian.
- Lewis Jacobs, 92, American screenwriter, film director and critic.
- Don Porter, 84, American actor.
- Glen Stewart, 84, American baseball player (New York Giants, Philadelphia Phillies).
- Ray Terrell, 77, American gridiron football player.

=== 12 ===
- Nora Beloff, 78, English journalist and political writer.
- James Cossins, 63, English actor, heart disease.
- Francis Healy, 86, American Major League Baseball player (New York Giants, St. Louis Cardinals).
- Ruth Winifred Howard, 96, American psychologist.
- Victor Huthart, 72, British Olympic sports shooter (1960).
- Federico Pisani, 22, Italian footballer, traffic collision.
- Heikki Raitio, 72, Finnish Olympic fencer (1948, 1952).

=== 13 ===
- Bobby Adams, 75, American baseball player.
- John R. Bartels, 99, American district judge (United States District Court for the Eastern District of New York).
- Thies Christophersen, 79, German neo-nazi and Holocaust denier.
- Robert Klark Graham, 90, American eugenicist and businessman.
- Robert Herman, 82, American scientist.
- Don Jordan, 62, American boxer, complications following robbery.
- Eduardo Kapstein, 82, Chilean Olympic basketball player (1936, 1948).
- Ernő Rubik, 86, Hungarian aircraft designer.
- Reg Ryan, 71, Irish football player.
- Atta Shad, 57, Pakistani poet, playwright, and intellectual.

=== 14 ===
- Lélia Gousseau, 88, 20th-century French classical pianist.
- Jack Matheson, 76, American gridiron football player (Detroit Lions, Chicago Bears).
- Charles Moffett, 67, American free jazz drummer.
- Miguel Rodriguez, 35, Filipino actor and model, pancreatitis.
- William L. Scott, 81, American politician, Alzheimer's disease.
- Chōbyō Yara, 94, Japanese politician and teacher.
- Mohammed Yousuf, 57, Pakistani singer.

=== 15 ===
- Oscar W. Adams Jr., 72, American lawyer and first African-American Alabama Supreme Court justice.
- Arne Berg, 87, Swedish Olympic road racing cyclist (1932, 1936).
- William Dippie, 89, Scottish cricketer.
- Philip Hershkovitz, 87, American mammalogist.
- Billie-Jo Jenkins, 13, English murder victim.
- Mazhar-Ul-Haque Khan, 73, Pakistani hurdler and Olympian (1948).
- Bob Lacey, 54, American football player (Minnesota Vikings).
- Paul Page, 69, American gridiron football player (Baltimore Colts).
- Frode Rinnan, 91, Norwegian architect and politician.
- Jack Sparling, 80, Canadian comic book artist (Claire Voyant, Strange Adventures, Ghost Rider).

=== 16 ===
- Peter Bullock, 72, English cricketer.
- Abd al-Fattah Abu Ghudda, 79, Syrian leader of the Muslim Brotherhood.
- Ethel Owen, 103, American actress.
- Alvis Vītoliņš, 50, Latvian chess master, suicide by jumping.
- Jack Wilson, 82, British rower and Olympic champion (1948).
- Chien-Shiung Wu, 84, Chinese-American experimental physicist, watershed stroke.

=== 17 ===
- Spartaco Bandinelli, 75, Italian boxer and Olympian (1948).
- Kenny Graham, 72, British jazz saxophonist, arranger and composer.
- Leonard Ho, 72, Hong Kong film producer.
- Ichimaru, 90, Japanese recording artist and geisha.
- Bärbel Inhelder, 83, Swiss psychologist.
- Joe Kieyoomia, 77, American Navajo prisoner of war during World War II.
- Darcy Ribeiro, 74, Brazilian anthropologist, historian, sociologist, author and politician, cancer.
- Georg L. Samuelsen, 87, Faroese editor and voice actor.

=== 18 ===
- Bozorg Alavi, 93, Iranian writer, novelist, and intellectual, heart attack.
- Enrique Peralta Azurdia, 88, President of Guatemala.
- Antonio de Almeida, 69, French conductor and musicologist, lung cancer, liver cancer.
- Gerd Domhardt, 51, German composer.
- Eric Fenby, 90, English composer, conductor, pianist and organist.
- Reggie Forte, 47, American activist and founding member of the Black Panther Party.
- Jnan Prakash Ghosh, 87, Indian harmonium and tabla player and musicologist.
- Emily Hahn, 92, American journalist and author.
- Austin Knickerbocker, 78, American baseball player (Philadelphia Athletics).
- Ingrid Larsen, 84, Danish Olympic diver (1932).
- Geoffrey Swaebe, 86, American diplomat and ambassador, complications of pneumonia.

=== 19 ===
- David Ashkenazi, 81, Russian pianist, accompanist and composer.
- Jarmil Burghauser, 75, Czech composer, conductor, and musicologist.
- Frank Delfino, 86, American actor, bone marrow cancer.
- Deng Xiaoping, 92, Chinese politician leader of the People's Republic of China, complications of lung infections.
- Buddy Edelen, 59, American marathon runner and Olympian (1964).
- António Gedeão, 90, Portuguese poet, essayist, writer and playwright.
- Yutaka Haniya, 87, Japanese writer and critic.
- Karin Magnussen, 89, German nazi eugenicist, biologist, and researcher during World War II.
- Lois Marshall, 73, Canadian soprano.
- Leo Rosten, 78, American humorist.
- Edsall Walker, 86, American Negro league baseball player.

=== 20 ===
- Afonsinho, 82, Brazilian football player.
- Paul Anxionnaz, 94, French politician.
- Zachary Breaux, 36, American jazz guitarist, drowned.
- Ruth Clark, 80, American pollster and researcher.
- Pierre Gascar, 80, French journalist, literary critic, writer, and screenwriter.
- Thomas G. Kavanagh, 79, American judge, Chief Justice of the Michigan Supreme Court (1975–1979).
- Arthur Machado, 88, Brazilian football player and manager.
- Stan Pearson, 78, English footballer.
- Delfim José da Silva, 77, Portuguese Olympic rower (1948).

=== 21 ===
- Ziya Bunyadov, 73, Azerbaijani historian and scientist, shot.
- Luitgard Im, 67, German actress.
- Choe Kwang, 78, North Korean army general and politician, heart attack.
- Mohamed Nasir, 81, Malaysian politician.
- Merle Pertile, 55, American model and actress.
- Josef Posipal, 69, Romanian-German footballer, heart failure.
- Kenneth Rowntree, 81, British artist.
- Leo Sjogren, 82, American Olympic racewalker (1952, 1956).
- Eleanor Howard, Countess of Wicklow, 82, Irish politician and architect.

=== 22 ===
- Joseph Aiuppa, 89, American mobster.
- Urmila Bhatt, 62/63, Indian actress, homicide.
- William Karush, 79, American mathematician.
- James A. Lewis, 63, American Libertarian Party politician.
- Harold Nichols, 79, American wrestler and wrestling coach.
- Albert Shanker, 68, American labor leader, bladder cancer.
- Charlie Toogood, 69, American gridiron football player (Los Angeles Rams, Chicago Cardinals).

=== 23 ===
- Abdelkader Ben Bouali, 84, French football player.
- John Currie, 65, Australian rules footballer.
- Gordon Glisson, 66, American jockey.
- Ephraim P. Holmes, 88, United States Navy admiral.
- Frank Launder, 91, British writer, film director and producer.
- Oscar Lewenstein, 80, British theatre and film producer.
- Olivier Masson, 74, French linguist.
- Gabe Scholten, 75, Dutch sprinter and Olympian (1948).
- Jack Slater, 69, Australian politician.
- Tony Williams, 51, American jazz drummer, heart attack.

=== 24 ===
- Astrid Fagraeus, 83, Swedish immunologist.
- Nils-Olof Franzén, 80, Swedish writer.
- Wolfgang Heinrich Johannes Fuchs, 81, British mathematician.
- Raymond Lambert, 82, Swiss mountaineer, complications of a lung disorder.
- Isabelle Lucas, 69, Canadian-British actress and singer, heart attack.
- Ernest C. Pollard, 90, British professor of physics and biophysics, stroke.
- Len Vlahov, 56, Australian discus thrower, cancer.
- Ion Voicu, 73, Romanian violinist and orchestral conductor.

=== 25 ===
- Cal Abrams, 72, American baseball player, heart attack.
- Hoss Allen, 74, American radio disc jockey.
- Louis Auslander, 68, American mathematician.
- Charles Chase, 66, Canadian Olympic boxer (1952).
- Earle Edwards, 88, American football player and coach.
- Scott Forbes, 76, British actor and screenwriter.
- Yi Han-yong, 36, North Korean defector, shot.
- Arthur Hewlett, 89, British actor. (exact date unconfirmed)
- Väinö Huhtala, 62, Finnish Olympic rower (1960).
- Scott Leggett, 34, American football player (Philadelphia Eagles).
- Danielle de St. Jorre, 55, Seychellois politician, cancer.
- Ugo Poletti, 82, Italian Cardinal of the Roman Catholic Church, heart attack.
- Ted Roach, 87, Australian trade unionist and member of the Communist Party of Australia.
- Andrei Sinyavsky, 71, Russian writer and Soviet dissident.
- John Williams, 70, Australian politician.

=== 26 ===
- Lynda Adams, 76, Canadian diver and Olympian (1936).
- Ferdinando Bernini, 86, Italian Olympic sports shooter (1948).
- Nuccio Bertone, 82, Italian automobile designer and constructor.
- Mildred Clingerman, 78, American science fiction author.
- David Doyle, 67, American actor (Charlie's Angels, Capricorn One, Rugrats), heart attack.
- Vincent Gaddis, 83, American author.
- Giovanni Ghiselli, 62, Italian sprinter and Olympian (1956).
- Joseph Anthony Lefante, 68, American politician, member of the United States House of Representatives (1977-1978).
- Tom O'Connor, 78, Irish Gaelic footballer.
- Ben Raleigh, 83, American lyricist and composer.
- Wende Wagner, 55, American actress (The Green Hornet, Rosemary's Baby, Destination Inner Space), cancer.

=== 27 ===
- Kingsley Davis, 88, American sociologist and demographer.
- Patricia Felicien, 30, Saint Lucian cricket player.
- William Gear, 81, Scottish painter.
- Indeevar, 73, Indian film lyricist.
- Alpo Jaakola, 67, Finnish painter and sculptor.
- Mieczysław Jagielski, 73, Polish politician and economist, heart attack.
- Kim Kwang-jin, 69, North Korean general and politician.
- Harry Love, 85, American animator, effects animator, and writer, heart attack.
- William R. Maples, 59, American forensic anthropologist, brain cancer.
- Edward J. McCormack, Jr., 73, American lawyer and politician, complications from lung cancer.

=== 28 ===
- Osvaldo Bailo, 84, Italian road cyclist.
- Donald Carrick, 90, Canadian lawyer, politician, sportsman and Olympian (1928).
- Norm Couper, 80, Australian rules footballer.
- Harold Dean, 84, Australian politician.
- Mohammad Moustafa Haddara, 67, Egyptian Arabic scholar and writer.
- Josef Hantych, 86, Czech Olympic weightlifter (1936, 1952).
- Örjan Martinsson, 60, Swedish football player.
- Giuseppe Migneco, 89, Italian painter.
- Les Munns, 88, American baseball player (Brooklyn Dodgers, St. Louis Cardinals).
- Larry Tillman, 88, American professional wrestler and promoter.
- Hal Turpin, 93, American baseball player.
