= Deaths in January 2004 =

The following is a list of notable deaths in January 2004.

Entries for each day are listed alphabetically by surname. A typical entry lists information in the following sequence:

- Name, age, country of citizenship at birth, subsequent country of citizenship (if applicable), reason for notability, cause of death (if known), and reference.

== January 2004 ==
=== 1 ===
- Charlie Elliott, 91, English cricketer.
- Harold Henning, 69, South African golfer.
- Elma Lewis, 82, American arts leader.
- Yevgeniy Migunov, 82, Russian artist, cartoonist, animation and art director, and screenwriter.
- Jerry Oliver, 59, American racing driver.
- Frederick Redlich, 93, Austrian-American dean of the Yale University School of Medicine.
- John Stoneham, 95, American baseball player (Chicago White Sox).
- Igor Torkar, 90, Slovenian writer, playwright, and poet.

=== 2 ===
- Dinu Adameșteanu, 90, Romanian-Italian archaeologist.
- Etta Moten Barnett, 102, American actress (Porgy and Bess), pancreatic cancer.
- Lynn Cartwright, 76, American actress (A League of Their Own, The Cry Baby Killer, The Wasp Woman), dementia.
- Jess Collins, 80, American visual artist.
- Geoff Edrich, 85, English first-class cricket player.
- John Grandy, 90, British Royal Air Force officer.
- Paul Hopkins, 99, American baseball player (Washington Senators, St. Louis Browns).
- Maria Clara Lobregat, 82, Filipina politician, heart attack.
- Sheila McKechnie, 55, Scottish trade unionist, housing campaigner and consumer activist, cancer.
- Kamal El Sheikh, 84, Egyptian film director.
- Dennis Silverthorne, 80, American Olympic pairs figure skater (1948).

=== 3 ===
- Lillian Beckwith, 87, English author.
- Des Corcoran, 75, Australian politician, Premier of South Australia.
- Taylor Duncan, 50, American baseball player (St. Louis Cardinals, Oakland Athletics).
- Pierre Flamion, 79, French football manager and player.
- T. G. Jones, 86, Welsh football player.
- William Craig Reynolds, 70, American fluid physicist and mechanical engineer.
- Leon Wagner, 69, American Major League Baseball player.
- Beatrice Winde, 79, American actress, cancer.

=== 4 ===
- Joan Aiken, 79, English author (The Wolves of Willoughby Chase).
- Benjamin Allmark, 92, Canadian politician, member of the House of Commons of Canada (1958-1962).
- Robert Brisco, 75, Canadian politician, member of the House of Commons of Canada (1974-1980, 1984-1988).
- Gary Cleveland, 61, American Olympic weightlifter (1964).
- James Counsilman, 83, American swimming coach, Parkinson's disease.
- Johannes Fehring, 77, Austrian composer.
- Brian Gibson, 59, English film director (What's Love Got to Do With It, The Juror, Poltergeist II: The Other Side), bone cancer.
- Jake Hess, 76, American southern gospel singer.
- Bob Kercher, 84, American football player (Georgetown Hoyas, Green Bay Packers).
- Refik Memišević, 47, Yugoslav wrestler and Olympian (1980, 1984).
- Allen H. Miner, 86, American director and screenwriter.
- Jeff Nuttall, 70, English poet, actor, artist, jazz trumpeter, and author.
- Helena Růžičková, 67, Czech actress and comedian, stomach cancer.
- Michael Whitney Straight, 87, American magazine publisher, author and a confessed spy for the KGB, pancreatic cancer.
- Dorota Terakowska, 65, Polish writer and journalist.
- John Toland, 91, American author and historian, pneumonia.
- Gábor Török, 67, Hungarian football goalkeeper and Olympian (1960).

=== 5 ===
- Jean Claes, 69, Belgian footballer.
- Thomas Daly, 90, Australian Army officer.
- Charles Dumas, 66, American Olympic High Jump gold medalist (1956, 1960), cancer.
- John Guerin, 64, American percussionist, heart failure.
- Norman Heatley, 92, British biochemist.
- Vivian Jenkins, 92, Welsh rugby player and sports journalist.
- Tug McGraw, 59, American baseball player (New York Mets, Philadelphia Phillies), brain cancer.
- Hans Wilhelmsson, 67, Swedish speed skater and Olympian (1960).

=== 6 ===
- Vera Bradford, 99, Australian pianist and piano teacher.
- Pierre Charles, 49, Dominican politician, Prime Minister (2000-2004), heart attack.
- Sumita Devi, 68, Bangladeshi film actress.
- John Evans, 74, British footballer.
- Philip Gilbert, 72, Canadian actor.
- António Jorge, 77, Portuguese Olympic sports shooter (1960).
- Nicolas Mosar, 76, Luxembourgish politician, jurist, and diplomat.
- Markku Salminen, 57, Finnish orienteering athlete.
- Francesco Scavullo, 82, American fashion photographer.
- Reg Smith, 91, English football player and manager.
- Thomas Stockham, 70, American scientist, known as the "father of digital recording".
- Theo Timmermans, 78, Dutch footballer.

=== 7 ===
- Shalva Apkhazava, 23, Georgian footballer, heart failure.
- Piotr Kowalski, 76, Polish artist, sculptor, and architect.
- Jaap Kraaier, 90, Dutch flatwater canoeist and Olympic medalist (1936).
- Vladimir Lavrinenko, 71, Soviet-Georgian swimmer and Olympian (1952).
- Khenpo Jigme Puntsok, 70, Nyingma lama and Terton from Sertha Region.
- Natalya Smirnitskaya, 76, Soviet javelin thrower.
- Ingrid Thulin, 77, Swedish actress (Cries and Whispers, Brink of Life, The Silence), cancer.
- Léonce-Albert Van Peteghem, 87, Belgian Roman Catholic Bishop.
- Mario Zatelli, 91, French football player and manager.

=== 8 ===
- Charles Brown, 57, American actor (King Hedley II, Trading Places, Kennedy), prostate cancer.
- Delfín Benítez Cáceres, 93, Paraguayan football player.
- John A. Gambling, 73, American radio host (Rambling with Gambling), heart attack.
- Tom Kindness, 74, American politician, member of the United States House of Representatives (1975-1987).
- Reginald H. Morris, 85, British-Canadian cinematographer (Porky's, A Christmas Story, Black Christmas).
- Piet van Overbeek, 77, Dutch footballer.
- Hal Shaper, 72, South African songwriter.
- Louis Stanley, 92, British author, journalist, team principal of BRM, stroke.
- Frank Ténot, 78, French press agent, pataphysician, and jazz critic.

=== 9 ===
- Norberto Bobbio, 94, Italian senator, jurist, philosopher and political scientist.
- Lyndon Brook, 77, British actor.
- Harriet Creighton, 94, American botanist, geneticist and educator.
- Yinka Dare, 31, Nigerian basketball player (George Washington Colonials, New Jersey Nets), heart attack.
- Nissim Ezekiel, 79, Indian poet, playwright and art critic.
- Rainer Hildebrandt, 89, German anti-communist resistance fighter and historian.
- Myron E. Leavitt, 73, American politician.
- Rogério Sganzerla, 57, Brazilian filmmaker, brain tumor.

=== 10 ===
- Marvin Crawford, 71, American Olympic skier (1956).
- Billy Klüver, 76, American electrical engineer at Bell Telephone Laboratories.
- Sidney Miller, 87, American actor, director and songwriter, Parkinson's disease.
- Princess Kira of Prussia, 60, German princess.
- Sir Henry Leask, 90, British general.
- Ewald Pyle, 93, American baseball player (St. Louis Browns, Washington Senators, New York Giants).
- Alexandra Ripley, 70, American author (Scarlett).

=== 11 ===
- Max D. Barnes, 67, country singer and songwriter.
- Clement Conger, 91, American museum curator, pneumonia.
- Perry Belmont Duryea Jr., 82, American politician, traffic collision.
- Spalding Gray, 62, American actor (The Killing Fields, The Paper) and writer (Swimming to Cambodia), suicide by drowning.
- Blair Harding, 33, New Zealand rugby league footballer.
- Bernard Mayeur, 65, French Olympic basketball player (1960).
- Mervyn Pike, Baroness Pike, 85, British politician and life peer.
- Asrul Sani, 76, Indonesian writer, poet and screenwriter.

=== 12 ===
- Petter Jakob Bjerve, 90, Norwegian economist, statistician and politician.
- James M. Early, 81, American electrical engineer.
- Ramakrishna Hegde, 77, Indian politician.
- Olga Ladyzhenskaya, 81, Soviet and Russian mathematician.
- Randy VanWarmer, 48, American singer and songwriter ("Just When I Needed You Most"), leukemia.
- William T. Young, 85, American businessman.
- Robert C. Zampano, 75, American district judge (United States District Court for the District of Connecticut).

=== 13 ===
- Joan Reventós i Carner, 76, Spanish politician.
- Lee Chang-hoon, 68, South Korean long-distance runner and Olympian (1956, 1960).
- Rafael Gambra Ciudad, 83, Spanish philosopher.
- Phillip Crosby, 69, American actor and singer, son of crooner Bing Crosby, heart attack.
- Mike Goliat, 82, American baseball player (Philadelphia Phillies, St. Louis Browns).
- Fritz Hamer, 91, German botanist.
- David N. Henderson, 82, American politician, member of the United States House of Representatives (1961-1977).
- Tom Hurndall, 22, British political activist, gunshot wound.
- Robert Kolesar, 82, American football player (Michigan Wolverines, Cleveland Browns).
- William Lawrence, 97, Australian politician.
- Jan Leszczyński, 57, Polish footballer.
- Arne Næss, Jr., 66, Norwegian mountaineer and businessman, former husband of Diana Ross, accidental death.
- Dave Penna, 46, American jockey in thoroughbred horse racing.
- Harold Shipman, 57, British serial killer, suicide by hanging.
- Zeno Vendler, 82, American philosopher and linguist.
- Keraca Visulčeva, 92, Macedonian and Bulgarian artist.

=== 14 ===
- Terje Bakken, 25, Norwegian black metal musician (Windir), hypothermia.
- Jack Cady, 71, American science fiction writer.
- Catherine Craig, 88, American actress.
- Uta Hagen, 84, German-American actress (Who's Afraid of Virginia Woolf?, Reversal of Fortune, The Boys from Brazil), Tony winner (1951, 1963), stroke.
- Joaquín Nin-Culmell, 95, Cuban-Spanish composer, concert pianist and emeritus professor of music at the University of California, Berkeley, heart attack.
- Ron O'Neal, 66, American actor (Superfly, Red Dawn, A Different World), pancreatic cancer.
- Eduard Sibiryakov, 62, Soviet Olympic volleyball player (1964, 1968).
- Eric Sturgess, 83, South African tennis player, winner of six Grand Slam doubles titles (five mixed doubles, one men's doubles).

=== 15 ===
- Maarouf al-Dawalibi, 94, Syrian politician, prime minister (1951, 1961-1962).
- Andy Barbe, 80, Canadian ice hockey player (Toronto Maple Leafs).
- André Barrais, 83, French Olympic basketball player (1948).
- Alex Barris, 81, Canadian actor and writer, stroke.
- Stoycho Vassilev Breskovski, 69, Bulgarian paleontologist.
- Ambroise-Marie Carré, 95, French Catholic priest, member of the Académie française.
- Johnny Cronshey, 77, English speed skater and Olympian (1948, 1956).
- Antoni Czortek, 89, Polish boxer and Olympian (1936).
- Jim Devlin, 81, American baseball player (Cleveland Indians).
- Sunday Emmanuel, 25, Nigerian athlete and Olympian (2000), car accident.
- Olivia Goldsmith, 55, American author, heart attack.
- Mohammad Yunus Saleem, 92, Indian politician, scholar, and lawyer.
- Manik Chandra Saha, 48, Bangladeshi journalist, bombing.
- Delia Scala, 74, Italian ballerina, actress and singer, breast cancer.
- Gus Suhr, 98, American baseball player (Pittsburgh Pirates).
- Attila Timár-Geng, 79, Hungarian Olympic basketball player (1948).

=== 16 ===
- Slavomír Bartoň, 77, Czech Olympic ice hockey player (1952, 1956).
- Alexander Eliraz, 89, Israeli Olympic sports shooter (1952).
- John Siomos, 56, American rock drummer.
- Kalevi Sorsa, 73, Finnish politician, prime minister (1972–1975, 1977–1979, 1982–1987).
- Albert Tillman, 76, American educator and underwater diver.

=== 17 ===
- Walter Auffenberg, 75, American biologist.
- Raymond Bonham Carter, 74, British banker and father of Helena Bonham Carter.
- Harry Brecheen, 89, American baseball player (St. Louis Cardinals, St. Louis Browns).
- Hersh Freeman, 75, American baseball player (Boston Red Sox, Cincinnati Redlegs, Chicago Cubs).
- Harold Laurance, 88, British Olympic weightlifter (1936).
- Czesław Niemen, 64, Polish musician, cancer.
- Zenobia Powell Perry, 95, American composer, professor and civil rights activist.
- Rafael Cordero Santiago, 61, Puerto Rican politician, mayor of Ponce, Puerto Rico, cerebral hemorrhage.
- Carlton R. Sickles, 82, American lawyer and politician (U.S. Representative for Maryland's at-large congressional seat).
- Ray Stark, 88, American film producer (Funny Girl, Steel Magnolias, Annie), heart attack.
- Noble Willingham, 72, American actor (Walker, Texas Ranger, City Slickers, Norma Rae), heart attack.

=== 18 ===
- Hook Dillon, 80, American basketball player (Washington Capitols).
- Peter Ward Fay, 79, American historian.
- Gérard Jarry, 67, French classical violinist.
- Bruno Silić, 45, Croatian water polo player and coach.

=== 19 ===
- Harry E. Claiborne, 86, American district judge of the American District Court for the District of Nevada, suicide by gunshot.
- Donnie Davis, 63, American football player (Dallas Cowboys, Houston Oilers).
- Tommy Glaviano, 80, American baseball player (St. Louis Cardinals, Philadelphia Phillies).
- David Hookes, 48, Australian cricketer and Victorian coach, heart attack.
- Edwin Knox, 89, American water polo player and Olympian (1948).
- Jerry Nachman, 57, American MSNBC editor-in-chief, cancer.
- Miroslav Pavlović, 61, Serbian football player.
- Murray Watkinson, 64, New Zealand rower and Olympian (1964, 1972).

=== 20 ===
- Alan Brown, 84, British Formula One driver.
- Bob Cowan, 81, American football player (Cleveland Browns, Baltimore Colts).
- Jean de Feu, 93, Belgian Olympic wrestler (1936).
- Timothy Gantz, 58, American classical scholar, heart attack.
- Walt Grealis, 74, Canadian publisher and music industry leader, lung cancer.
- Olivier Guichard, 83, French politician.
- Lloyd Merriman, 79, American baseball player (Cincinnati Reds/Redlegs, Chicago White Sox, Chicago Cubs).
- Bernard Punsly, 80, American physician and actor, cancer.
- Don Shinnick, 68, American professional football player (UCLA, Baltimore Colts) and coach, neurological disorder.
- Guinn Smith, 83, American Olympic pole vaulter (1948), pulmonary emphysema.
- Marie Wegman, 78, American baseball player.
- George Woodbridge, 73, American illustrator.

=== 21 ===
- Rao Farman Ali, 81, Pakistani military officer.
- M. Arunachalam, 59, Indian politician and Union Minister.
- Eppie Barney, 59, American football player (Iowa State Cyclones, Cleveland Browns).
- Johnny Blatnik, 82, American baseball player (Philadelphia Phillies, St. Louis Cardinals).
- Luis Cuenca García, 82, Spanish actor, lung disease.
- Jim Henry, 83, Canadian ice hockey player (New York Rangers, Chicago Black Hawks, Boston Bruins).
- Mike Karmazin, 84, American football player (New York Yankees), and coach.
- John T. Lewis, 71, Welsh physicist.
- Jock Newall, 86, New Zealand football player.
- Yordan Radichkov, 74, Bulgarian writer and playwright.
- Ray Rayner, 84, American actor (Bozo's Circus), pneumonia.
- Juan Zambudio Velasco, 82, Spanish football goalkeeper.

=== 22 ===
- Milt Bernhart, 77, American jazz trombonist.
- Gérard Darrieu, 78, French actor.
- Islwyn Ffowc Elis, 79, British Welsh language writer.
- Ticky Holgado, 59, French actor, lung cancer.
- Billy May, 87, American big band and pop music arranger, heart attack.
- Janez Menart, 74, Slovene poet.
- Ann Miller, 80, American actress (You Can't Take It with You, Room Service, Mulholland Drive), lung cancer.
- Royce Smith, 54, American gridiron football player (Georgia, New Orleans Saints, Atlanta Falcons).
- Chea Vichea, Cambodian labor leader, homicide.
- Charlotte Zwerin, 72, American documentary film director and editor, lung cancer.
- Rudi Šeligo, 68, Slovenian writer, playwright, essayist and politician.

=== 23 ===
- Zdzisław Ambroziak, 60, Polish volleyball player and Olympian (1968, 1972).
- Eddy Carbonnelle, 77, Belgian Olympic field hockey player (1960).
- John Dudderidge, 97, British Olympic canoeist (1936).
- Albert Henderson, 88, American actor (Serpico, The Postman Always Rings Twice, Barfly).
- Bob Keeshan, 76, American actor (Captain Kangaroo), heart attack.
- Vasili Mitrokhin, 81, Soviet/Russian/British KGB-officer and defector.
- Helmut Newton, 83, German-Australian photographer, heart attack.
- Lennart Strand, 82, Swedish Olympic middle-distance runner (1948).
- Tom Warhurst, Sr., 86, Australian tennis player.

=== 24 ===
- Anita W. Addison, 51, American television and film director and producer, breast cancer.
- Tomio Aoki, 80, Japanese film actor, lung cancer.
- Alberto Bienvenú, 87, Mexican Olympic basketball player (1948).
- Gordon Brook-Shepherd, 85, British intelligence agent, journalist, and historian.
- Reva Brooks, 90, Canadian photographer.
- François De Deken, 91, Belgian footballer.
- Gyula Kristó, 64, Hungarian historian and medievalist.
- Leônidas, 90, Brazilian football player, complications due to Alzheimer's disease.
- Abdul Rahman Munif, 70, Saudi novelist, journalist, and cultural critic, kidney and heart failure.
- Vladimir Nekora, 65, Croatian Olympic rower (1960).
- Jack Tunney, 69, Canadian professional wrestling promoter, heart attack.

=== 25 ===
- Fanny Blankers-Koen, 85, Dutch track and field athlete and Olympian (1936, 1948, 1952).
- Miklós Fehér, 24, Hungarian football player, cardiac arrest, heart attack.
- Lou Ferry, 76, American football player (Green Bay Packers, Chicago Cardinals, Pittsburgh Steelers).
- Barry van Heekeren, 71, Australian rugby league footballer.
- V. K. N., 74, Indian Malayalam writer.
- Zurab Sakandelidze, 58, Soviet Georgian Olympic basketball player (1968, 1972).
- Robert Wood, 77, American Olympic sailor (1960).

=== 26 ===
- Wilhelmina Barns-Graham, 91, British artist.
- Fred Haas, 88, American golfer.
- Krzysztof Hausner, 59, Polish footballer.
- Jacob Mishler, 92, American judge (US district judge of the District Court for the Eastern District of New York).
- John Morelli, 80, American football player (Georgetown Hoyas, Boston Yanks).
- Stanley Nantais, 90, Canadian basketball player, coach, and Olympian (1936).
- Bata Paskaljević, 81, Serbian actor.
- Hugh Jenkins, Baron Jenkins of Putney, 95, British politician.
- Shōgo Shimada, 98, Japanese film actor, stroke.
- Magne Skodvin, 88, Norwegian educator and historian.

=== 27 ===
- Bill Carey, 87, American songwriter, actor, and author.
- Rikki Fulton, 79, Scottish comedian, Alzheimer's disease.
- Hard Boiled Haggerty, 78, American professional wrestler and actor (Foxy Brown, Paint Your Wagon, Micki & Maude), stroke.
- Harry Lindley Hupp, 74, American district judge (United States District Court for the Central District of California).
- Salvador Laurel, 75, Filipino lawyer and politician, Vice President (1986–1992), lymphoma.
- Jack Paar, 85, American author, and The Tonight Show host, stroke.
- Hugh Scanlon, 90, British trade union leader.

=== 28 ===
- José Miguel Agrelot, 76, Puerto Rican comedian, radio and television host, heart attack.
- Lloyd M. Bucher, 76, United States Navy officer.
- Dino Dines, 59, British keyboard player (T. Rex), heart attack.
- Alexander Eke, 91, British Olympic basketball player (1948).
- Elroy Hirsch, 80, American gridiron football player (Chicago Rockets, Los Angeles Rams).
- Trevor Hold, 64, English composer, poet and author.
- Yukihiko Ikeda, 66, Japanese politician, cancer.
- Eeva Joenpelto, 82, Finnish novelist.
- André Van Lysebeth, 84, Belgian yoga instructor and author.
- Joe Viterelli, 66, American actor (Analyze This, Bullets Over Broadway, Shallow Hal), complications from heart surgery.

=== 29 ===
- Norman Bates, 76, American jazz double-bass player.
- Mary-Ellis Bunim, 57, American producer and co-creator of The Real World, breast cancer.
- A. A. Englander, 87, British television cinematographer.
- O. W. Fischer, 88, Austrian actor, kidney failure.
- Janet Frame, 79, New Zealand writer, leukaemia.
- M. M. Kaye, 95, British author, The Far Pavilions.
- Andrew J. Kuehn, 66, American film producer.
- Guusje Nederhorst, 34, Dutch actress, breast cancer.
- Louie B. Nunn, 79, American politician, Governor of Kentucky (1967-1971), heart attack.
- Stojan Puc, 82, Yugoslavian (Slovenian) chess International Master.
- Soko Richardson, 64, American rhythm and blues drummer (Ike & Tina Turner, John Mayall & the Bluesbreakers, Albert Collins).
- James Saunders, 79, British playwright.
- Helge Seip, 84, Norwegian politician (Social Liberal Party).
- Serafim Tulikov, 89, Soviet/Russian composer.

=== 30 ===
- George Bennions, 90, British fighter pilot during World War II.
- Bruno Cesari, 70, Italian art director (The Last Emperor, The Talented Mr. Ripley, Once Upon a Time in America), Oscar winner (1988).
- Malachi Favors, 76, American jazz bassist, pancreatic cancer.
- Frank Mantooth, 56, American jazz pianist and arranger.
- José Álvaro Morais, 60, Portuguese film director, cancer.
- Fuad Rouhani, 96, Iranian administrator and translator.
- Jacques Trudel, 84, Canadian politician, member of the House of Commons of Canada (1968-1979).

=== 31 ===
- Ernest Burke, 79, American baseball player, kidney cancer.
- Téofilo Colón, 89, Puerto Rican hurdler and Olympian (1952).
- William Herrick, 89, American novelist.
- Eleanor Holm, 91, American Olympic swimmer (1928, 1932).
- Eugenio Jáudenes, 84, Spanish Olympic sailor (1968).
- V. G. Jog, 81, Indian violinist, Parkinson's disease.
- James Levin Latchum, 85, American district judge (United States District Court for the District of Delaware).
- Cyril Maidment, 75, English motorcycle speedway rider.
- Suraiya, 74, Indian actress and singer.
