= Deaths in July 2001 =

The following is a list of notable deaths in July 2001.

Entries for each day are listed alphabetically by surname. A typical entry lists information in the following sequence:

- Name, age, country of citizenship at birth, subsequent country of citizenship (if applicable), reason for notability, cause of death (if known), and reference.

== July 2001 ==
=== 1 ===
- Nikolay Basov, 78, Soviet physicist and co-winner of Nobel Prize in Physics in 1964.
- Bob Cifers, 80, American professional football player (Detroit Lions, Pittsburgh Steelers, Green Bay Packers).
- Halina Czerny-Stefańska, 78, Polish pianist.
- Hélène de Beauvoir, 91, French painter and sister of Simone de Beauvoir.
- Tony Leswick, 78, Canadian ice hockey player (New York Rangers, Detroit Red Wings, Chicago Black Hawks), cancer.

=== 2 ===
- Ron Forwick, 57, Canadian football player, cancer.
- Jack Gwillim, 91, English character actor (My Fair Lady, Lawrence of Arabia, A Man for All Seasons, Patton).
- Israel Shahak, 68, Israeli organic chemist and civil rights activist, diabetes.
- James P. Vreeland, 91, American Republican Party politician.

=== 3 ===
- Delia Derbyshire, 64, British musician and composer of electronic music (BBC Radiophonic Workshop), renal failure caused by cancer.
- Gerald L. Geison, 58, American historian, enlarged heart.
- Lelord Kordel, 92, Polish-American nutritionist and author of books on healthy living.
- Billy Liddell, 79, Scottish footballer.
- Baharuddin Lopa, 65, Indonesian attorney general, heart failure.
- John Marriott, 78, British philatelist.
- Roy Nichols, 68, American guitarist (lead guitarist for Merle Haggard's band), heart attack.
- Mordecai Richler, 70, Canadian author, (The Apprenticeship of Duddy Kravitz, Barney's Version, Jacob Two-Two), kidney cancer.
- Johnny Russell, 61, American country singer ("Rednecks, White Socks and Blue Ribbon Beer") and songwriter ("Act Naturally"), complications from diabetes.
- Paolo Silveri, 87, Italian baritone.
- Ivan Slamnig, 71, Croatian poet, novelist, and literary theorist.

=== 4 ===
- Roberto Cabrejas, 48, Spanish Olympic high jumper (1980), motorcycle crash.
- Omar Ali Juma, 60, Chief Minister of Zanzibar from 25 January 1988 to October 1995.
- Serafim Pinto Ribeiro Júnior, 85, Brazilian football player.
- Charles Neider, 86, American writer.
- Charles Saxton, 88, New Zealand cricketer, rugby player and coach, emphysema.
- Anthony Synnot, 79, officer in the Royal Australian Navy.
- Joan-Josep Tharrats, 83, Spanish painter, art theorist and publisher.
- Anne Yeats, 82, Irish painter, costume and stage designer.

=== 5 ===
- Ely Callaway Jr., 82, American entrepreneur and golf club maker, pancreatic cancer.
- George Dawson, 103, American author.
- A. D. Flowers, 84, American film special effects artist (Tora! Tora! Tora!, The Poseidon Adventure, Apocalypse Now), Oscar winner (1971, 1973), emphysema and pneumonia.
- Bela Imre, 81, Romanian Olympic alpine skier (1948).
- Ernie K-Doe, 68, African-American rhythm-and-blues singer ("Mother-in-Law"), liver cirrhosis.
- Hannelore Kohl, 68, wife of former German chancellor Helmut Kohl, suicide.
- Keenan Milton, 26, American professional skateboarder, drowned.

=== 6 ===
- Jack Francis, 93, Australian sportsman.
- Derek Freeman, 84, New Zealand anthropologist, congestive heart failure.
- Enrique Mateos, 66, Spanish footballer.
- Harry Rhodes, 78, American baseball player.
- Viktor Yakushev, 63, Soviet ice hockey player and Olympian (1960, 1964).

=== 7 ===
- Dempsey Barron, 79, American politician, President of the Florida Senate, complications from Alzheimer's and Parkinson's diseases.
- Sjoerd Joustra, 85, Dutch architect.
- Arthur Kristiansen, 77, Norwegian Olympic ice hockey player (1952).
- Molly Lamont, 91, British film actress.
- Surender Kumar Malik, 58, Indian mathematician.
- Fred Neil, 65, American folk singer and songwriter ("Everybody's Talkin'"), natural causes.
- Toni Pagot, 79, Italian comics artist and animator.
- Joseph Stulac, 66, Canadian Olympic basketball player (1964).
- John Roland Sweeney, 70, Canadian politician, heart attack.
- Tim Temerario, 95, American football coach and executive, heart failure.

=== 8 ===
- Rolim Amaro, 58, Brazilian pilot and airline owner, helicopter crash.
- Ernst Baier, 95, German Olympic figure skater (1932, 1936).
- Big Ed, 29, American rapper, throat cancer.
- Walter Good, 93, American Olympic weightlifter (1936).
- Christl Haas, 57, Austrian skier and Olympic champion (1964, 1968), heart attack.
- William Kuhlemeier, 92, American Olympic gymnast (1932).
- Jia Lanpo, 92, Chinese palaeoanthropologist.
- Amiya Bhushan Majumdar, 83, Indian writer.
- Neil Midgley, 58, English football referee, cancer.
- John O'Shea, 81, New Zealand film director (Broken Barrier, Runaway, Don't Let It Get You).
- Irma Seikkula, 87, Finnish actress.

=== 9 ===
- Maria Chabot, 87, American advocate of Native American arts and rancher.
- Al Lary, 72, American baseball player (Chicago Cubs), drowned.
- Jorge Novak, 73, Argentine Roman Catholic prelate, stomach cancer.
- Thomas F. Schweigert, 83, American politician.
- Tauno Sipilä, 79, Finnish cross-country skier and Olympian (1952).
- Willy Sommer, 76, Swiss football striker and manager.
- İbrahim Tusder, 86, Turkish Olympic footballer (1936).
- Arie van Vliet, 85, Dutch Olympic sprint cyclist (1936).

=== 10 ===
- Vyacheslav Bezukladnikov, 32, Russian ice hockey player and Olympian (1994), liver cirrhosis.
- Humayun Rashid Choudhury, 72, Bangladeshi diplomat and politician, heart attack.
- Geoffrey Clarkson, 57, English rugby player.
- Tony Criscola, 86, American baseball player (St. Louis Browns, Cincinnati Reds).
- Giulio Gerardi, 88, Italian Olympic cross-country skier (1936).
- Jean-Claude Grèt, 70, Swiss racing cyclist.
- Álvaro Magaña, 75, Salvadoran politician, President (1982–1984).
- Danny O'Brien, 62, Irish Olympic boxer (1960).
- Friedel Overwien, 78, German Olympic gymnast (1952).
- Jack Piana, 82, American basketball player.

=== 11 ===
- Herman Brood, 54, Dutch rock musician and painter, suicide by jumping.
- Joseph Crockett, 96, American Olympic sports shooter (1924).
- Cândida Branca Flor, 51, Portuguese entertainer and singer, suicide.
- Salamat Ali Khan, 66, Pakistani vocalist and artist, kidney failure.
- Oto Rebula, 79, Yugoslavian Olympic decathlete (1948, 1952).
- Qateel Shifai, 81, Pakistani poet.
- Marco Zanuso, 85, Italian architect and designer.

=== 12 ===
- James Bernard, 75, English film composer (The Curse of Frankenstein, Dracula) and screenwriter (Seven Days to Noon), Oscar winner (1952).
- Bill Crabtree, 86, Australian politician.
- Juan Nepomuceno Guerra Cárdenas, 85, Mexican crime lord, bootlegger, and smuggler, respiratory disease.
- Vlado Dapčević, 84, Yugoslav-Montenegrin communist and revolutionary.
- Mirvarid Dilbazi, 88, Azerbaijani poet.
- John H. Holdridge, 76, American diplomat, pulmonary fibrosis.
- Ron Kroon, 58, Dutch Olympic freestyle swimmer (1960, 1964).
- Paul Magloire, 93, Haitian politician, President (1950–1956).
- Fred Marcellino, 61, American illustrator and children's author, colorectal cancer.
- Alioune Sarr, 92, Senegalese historian, author and politician.
- Chris Saunders-Griffiths, 72, British Olympic field hockey player (1960).
- Charleszetta Waddles, 88, American activist and church minister.
- Johnny Wright, 72, British boxer and Olympic silver medalist (1948).

=== 13 ===
- Miguel Gila Cuesta, 82, Spanish comedian and actor, respiratory disease.
- Bill Fogarty, 79, Australian politician.
- César López Fretes, 78, Paraguayan football player.
- Thomas Taylor, Baron Taylor of Gryfe, 89, British politician.
- David Noyes Jackson, 78, American writer and artist.
- Åse-Marie Nesse, 67, Norwegian philologist, translator and poet, cancer.
- Eleanor Summerfield, 80, English actress (Laughter in Paradise, Odongo, Dentist in the Chair, On the Fiddle, The Running Man).
- Juan José Timón, 63, Uruguayan Olympic cyclist (1960, 1964).
- Mohamed Zafzaf, 56, Moroccan novelist and poet, cancer.

=== 14 ===
- John Lax, 89, American Olympic ice hockey player (1936).
- Agustín Navarro, Spanish film director, respiratory disease.
- Jack Sheppard, 92, British cave diver.
- Karen-Sofie Styrmoe, 70, Norwegian Olympic alpine skier (1952).

=== 15 ===
- Anthony Ian Berkeley, 36, American rapper and producer, colon cancer.
- Ted Berman, 81, American film director, animator, and screenwriter (Bambi, Fantasia, The Black Cauldron), heart failure.
- Tom Chantrell, 84, British film poster artist (The King and I, One Million Years B.C., Far From The Madding Crowd), heart attack.
- Helge Rognlien, 81, Norwegian politician.
- Marina Știrbei, 89, Romanian aviator.
- Rudi Valenta, 80, Austrian cyclist and Olympian (1948).

=== 16 ===
- Tom Askwith, 90, British Olympic rower (1932, 1936) and a colonial administrator.
- John Dagenhard, 84, American baseball player (Boston Braves).
- Terry Gordy, 40, American professional wrestler (Fabulous Freebirds), heart attack.
- Christina Cruickshank Miller, 101, Scottish chemist.
- Morris, 77, Belgian cartoonist (Lucky Luke), pulmonary embolism following a fall.
- Beate Uhse-Rotermund, 81, German female stunt pilot, Luftwaffe pilot during World War II and sex shop owner, pneumonia.

=== 17 ===
- Timur Apakidze, 47, Russian fighter pilot and navy officer, aviation accident.
- Sara Ashurbeyli, 95, Azerbaijani historian, orientalist and scholar.
- Abel Carlevaro, 84, Uruguayan classical guitar composer, performer and teacher.
- Yehiel De-Nur, 92, Israeli writer and Holocaust survivor, cancer.
- Val Feld, 53, Welsh politician, cancer.
- Katharine Graham, 84, American publisher (The Washington Post), horse fall.
- Elon Hogsett, 97, American baseball player (Detroit Tigers, St. Louis Browns, Washington Senators).
- Wilhelm Simetsreiter, 86, German football player and Olympian (1936).
- Ziya Taner, 77, Macedonian-Turkish football manager.

=== 18 ===
- Roderic Bowen, 87, Welsh lawyer and Liberal Party politician.
- Phillip Alexander Clancey, 83, British ornithologist.
- Mimi Fariña, 56, American singer-songwriter and activist, neuroendocrine cancer.
- Roy Gilchrist, 67, West Indian cricket player, Parkinson's disease.
- Alex Jany, 72, French Olympic swimmer and water polo player (1948, 1952, 1956, 1960).
- Ritchie Johnston, 70, New Zealand Olympic track cyclist (1956).
- Ika Panajotovic, 69, Serbian-American film producer and tennis player, cardiac arrest during surgery.
- Barry Shetrone, 63, American baseball player (Baltimore Orioles, Washington Senators).
- Fabio Taglioni, 80, Italian automotive engineer.

=== 19 ===
- Erik Barnouw, 93, American historian of radio and television broadcasting, cancer.
- Karl-Heinz Becker, 89, German Olympic long-distance runner (1936).
- Paul Beeson, 79, British cinematographer.
- Judy Clay, 62, American soul and gospel singer, complications from a car crash.
- Gunther Gebel-Williams, 66, Polish-American animal trainer (Ringling Bros. and Barnum & Bailey Circus), cancer.
- Neil Carmichael, Baron Carmichael of Kelvingrove, 79, British politician, stroke.
- Charles King, 89, British cyclist and Olympic medalist (1936).
- Peter Lucas, 68, New Zealand Olympic rower (1956).

=== 20 ===
- Charlie Armstrong, 82, American football player (Brooklyn Dodgers).
- Oscar Arredondo, 83, Cuban paleontologist and ornithologist.
- Thomas Fantl, 72, German film director and screenwriter.
- Milt Gabler, 90, American record producer.
- Carlo Giuliani, 23, Italian anti-globalization demonstrator, shot.
- Skeeter Werner Walker, 67, American alpine skier and Olympian (1956), cancer.

=== 21 ===
- Muqbil bin Haadi al-Waadi'ee, Yemeni Islamic scholar, liver disease.
- Antal Bánkuti, 78, Hungarian Olympic basketball player (1948).
- Steve Barton, 47, American actor (The Phantom of the Opera, The Red Shoes), suicide.
- Carlo Bo, 90, Italian poet and literary critic.
- Hans Claussen, 89, German Olympic weightlifter (1952).
- Krste Crvenkovski, 80, Yugoslav communist politician.
- Sivaji Ganesan, 74, Indian actor.
- Charles Perry, 80, American basketball player.
- Einar Schleef, 57, German dramatist, director, writer, painter, and actor, heart disease.

=== 22 ===
- William L. Beatty, 75, American district judge (United States District Court for the Southern District of Illinois).
- Fanny Brennan, 80, French-American surrealist artist and painter.
- Bertie Felstead, 106, British World War I soldier and the last witness of the Christmas truce of 1914.
- Bob Ferguson, 73, American country music songwriter and record producer, cancer.
- Maria Gorokhovskaya, 79, Soviet Olympic gymnast (1952).
- Frances Horwich, 94, American educator, television personality and television executive, congestive heart failure.
- Herbert L. Ley, Jr., 77, American physician and head of the U.S. F.D.A., cardiovascular disease.
- Indro Montanelli, 92, Italian journalist and historian, urinary tract infection.
- David Nelson, 38, English rugby league footballer, shot.
- Stanley Jedidiah Samartha, 80, Indian theologian.

=== 23 ===
- Douglas Boyle, 77, Canadian navy officer.
- André Fouché, 92, French actor.
- Zhang Pinghua, 93, Chinese politician.
- Eudora Welty, 92, American short story writer and novelist (Pulitzer Prize for The Optimist's Daughter), pneumonia.

=== 24 ===
- Michael Amberg, 75, British fencer and Olympian (1960).
- Rezső von Bartha, 88, Hungarian Olympic fencer and modern pentathlete (1936).
- Carrie Best, 98, Canadian journalist and social activist, natural causes.
- Georges Dor, 70, Canadian singer and songwriter ("Le Manic"), playwright and theatrical producer.
- Nathan Isgur, 54, American-Canadian theoretical physicist, multiple myeloma.
- Maria Sołtan, 80, Polish Olympic fencer (1952).
- Hiroshi Tsuburaya, 37, Japanese actor, liver cancer.

=== 25 ===
- Jenner Armour, 68, Dominica politician and barrister.
- Phoolan Devi, 37, Indian dacoit and politician, shot.
- Josef Klaus, 90, Austrian politician, chancellor (1964-1970).
- Carmen Portinho, 98, Brazilian civil engineer, urbanist, and feminist.
- Fahd bin Salman bin Abdulaziz Al Saud, 46, member of the House of Saud, heart failure.

=== 26 ===
- Rex T. Barber, 84, American fighter pilot during World War II.
- Jacques Bens, 70, French writer and poet.
- Henry Coston, 90, French far-right journalist, collaborationist and conspiracy theorist.
- Stefan Doniec, 93, Polish footballer.
- H. Rex Lee, 91, American government diplomat and governor.
- Rudolf Nussgruber, 83, Austrian film director.
- Giorgi Sanaia, 26, Georgian television journalist, homicide.
- Giuseppe Sensi, 94, Italian cardinal of the Roman Catholic Church.
- Peter von Zahn, 88, German author, film maker, and journalist.

=== 27 ===
- Sir Harold Beeley, 92, British diplomat.
- Piet Bromberg, 84, Dutch field hockey player and Olympic medalist (1948).
- Jan Falkowski, 89, Polish fighter ace.
- Harold Land, 72, American hard bop and post-bop tenor saxophonist, stroke.
- Rhonda Sing, 40, Canadian professional wrestler, heart attack.
- Leon Wilkeson, 49, American musician (Lynyrd Skynyrd).

=== 28 ===
- Eric Bedford, 91, British architect.
- John Easton, 68, American baseball player (Philadelphia Phillies), melanoma.
- Joan Finney, 76, American politician and 42nd governor of Kansas (1991–1995), liver cancer.
- Eldon Grier, 84, Canadian poet and artist.
- Siddiq Khan Kanju, 49, Pakistani politician.
- Yngvar Karlsen, 81, Norwegian Olympic speed skater (1952).
- Baby LeRoy, 69, American child actor.
- Lindsay Rodda, 78, Australian rugby league footballer.
- Ahmed Sofa, 58, Bangladeshi writer, novelist, and poet, cardiac arrest.
- Martin Stern, Jr., 84, American architect.
- Fūtarō Yamada, 79, Japanese author.

=== 29 ===
- Edward Gierek, 88, Polish communist politician, First Secretary of the Polish United Workers' Party (1970-1980), lung cancer.
- Wau Holland, 49, German computer hacker, brainstem stroke.
- Tommy Millar, 62, Scottish football player.
- Alex Nicol, 85, American actor (South Pacific, Cat on a Hot Tin Roof, The Twilight Zone, The Outer Limits), natural causes.
- Edward Roberts, 93, British Anglican prelate.
- Elizabeth Yates, 95, American children's author.

=== 30 ===
- Carl Anderson, 87, American basketball player.
- Dennis Coralluzzo, 48, American professional wrestling promoter, brain hemorrhage.
- Charley Fuller, 62, American football player (Oakland Raiders).
- Ignacio Goldstein, 77, Chilean Olympic fencer (1948).
- Thelma Grambo, 77, Canadian baseball player.
- Ekkehard Gries, 64, German politician and member of the Bundestag.
- Joseph-Philippe Guay, 85, Canadian member of Parliament (House of Commons).
- Bill Schelter, 54, American professor of mathematics and developer of Lisp, heart attack.
- Anton Schwarzkopf, 77, German roller coaster manufacturer, Parkinson's disease.
- Petar B. Vasilev, 83, Bulgarian film director and screenwriter.
- John Walters, 62, British radio producer, presenter and musician, heart attack.
- Irina Zaritskaya, 62, Ukrainian pianist.

=== 31 ===
- Poul Anderson, 74, American science fiction author (seven Hugo Awards and three Nebula Awards), prostate cancer.
- Bill Borthwick, 76, Australian politician.
- Pelageya Danilova, 83, Russian artistic gymnast and Olympian (1952).
- Arthur Geoffrey Dickens, 91, British historian.
- Philip Gaskell, 75, British bibliographer and librarian.
- Francisco da Costa Gomes, 87, Portuguese military officer and politician, president (1974-1976), respiratory failure.
- Satur Grech, 87, Spanish football player and manager.
- Friedrich Franz, Hereditary Grand Duke of Mecklenburg-Schwerin, 91, German heir and Waffen-SS officer during World War II.
- Joris Tjebbes, 71, Dutch freestyle swimmer and Olympian (1952).
- Miklós Vásárhelyi, 83, Hungarian journalist and politician, member of the National Assembly (1990–1994).
