= Wrestling at the 1996 Summer Olympics – Men's Greco-Roman 130 kg =

Men's Greco-Roman 130 kg at the Games of the XXVI Olympiad
- Venue: Georgia World Congress Center
- Dates: 22–23 July 1996
- Competitors: 19 from 19 nations

Medalists
1st place, gold medalist(s)		Aleksandr Karelin	Russia
2nd place, silver medalist(s)		Matt Ghaffari	United States
3rd place, bronze medalist(s)		Sergei Mureiko	Moldova

The men's Greco-Roman 130 kilograms at the 1996 Summer Olympics as part of the wrestling program were held at the Georgia World Congress Center from July 22 to July 23. The gold and silver medalists were determined by the final match of the main single-elimination bracket. The losers advanced to the repechage. These matches determined the bronze medalist for the event.

== Results ==
=== Round 1 ===
	Score		CP
1/16 finals
Rachid Belaziz (MAR)	0–8	Tomas Johansson (SWE)	0–3 PO
Aleksandr Karelin (RUS)	10–0	Omrane Ayari (TUN)	4–0 ST
Sergei Mureiko (MDA)	12–1	Laurenţiu Amariei (ROM)	4–1 SP
Yogi Johl (CAN)	0–0	Helger Hallik (EST)	0–3 PO
Guillermo Díaz (MEX)	0–10	Panagiotis Poikilidis (GRE)	0–4 ST
Petro Kotok (UKR)	5–0	Raoul Dgvareli (TJK)	3–0 PO
Matt Ghaffari (USA)	7–1	Shermukhammad Kuziev (UZB)	3–1 PP
Liu Guoke (CHN)	0–3	René Schiekel (GER)	0–3 PO
Kenichi Suzuki (JPN)	0–3	György Kékes (HUN)	0–3 PO
Juha Ahokas (FIN)		Bye	

=== Round 2 ===
	Score		CP
1/8 finals
Juha Ahokas (FIN)	2–0	Tomas Johansson (SWE)	3–0 PO
Aleksandr Karelin (RUS)	2–0	Sergei Mureiko (MDA)	3–0 PO
Helger Hallik (EST)	0–3	Panagiotis Poikilidis (GRE)	0–3 PO
Petro Kotok (UKR)	0–3	Matt Ghaffari (USA)	0–3 PO
René Schiekel (GER)	2–0	György Kékes (HUN)	3–0 PO
Repechage
Rachid Belaziz (MAR)	2–4	Omrane Ayari (TUN)	1–3 PP
Laurenţiu Amariei (ROM)	1–3	Yogi Johl (CAN)	1–3 PP
Guillermo Díaz (MEX)	2–4	Raoul Dgvareli (TJK)	1–3 PP
Shermukhammad Kuziev (UZB)	6–1	Liu Guoke (CHN)	3–1 PP
Kenichi Suzuki (JPN)		Bye	

=== Round 3 ===
	Score		CP
Quarterfinals
Juha Ahokas (FIN)	0–4 Fall	Aleksandr Karelin (RUS)	0–4 TO
Panagiotis Poikilidis (GRE)		Bye	
Matt Ghaffari (USA)		Bye	
René Schiekel (GER)		Bye	
Repechage
Kenichi Suzuki (JPN)	4–3	Omrane Ayari (TUN)	3–1 PP
Yogi Johl (CAN)	0–2	Raoul Dgvareli (TJK)	0–3 PO
Shermukhammad Kuziev (UZB)	1–1	Tomas Johansson (SWE)	1–3 PP
Sergei Mureiko (MDA)	4–0	Helger Hallik (EST)	3–0 PO
Petro Kotok (UKR)	4–0	György Kékes (HUN)	3–0 PO

=== Round 4 ===
	Score		CP
Semifinals
Aleksandr Karelin (RUS)	8–0 Fall	Panagiotis Poikilidis (GRE)	4–0 TO
Matt Ghaffari (USA)	4–0	René Schiekel (GER)	3–0 PO
Repechage
Kenichi Suzuki (JPN)	8–0	Raoul Dgvareli (TJK)	3–0 PO
Tomas Johansson (SWE)	0–3	Sergei Mureiko (MDA)	0–3 PO
Petro Kotok (UKR)	2–0	Juha Ahokas (FIN)	3–0 PO

=== Round 5 ===
	Score		CP
Repechage
Kenichi Suzuki (JPN)	0–11	Sergei Mureiko (MDA)	0–4 ST
Petro Kotok (UKR)		Bye	

=== Round 6 ===
	Score		CP
Repechage
Panagiotis Poikilidis (GRE)	1–3	Petro Kotok (UKR)	1–3 PP
Sergei Mureiko (MDA)	5–0	René Schiekel (GER)	3–0 PO

=== Finals ===
	Score		CP
Classification 7th–8th
Kenichi Suzuki (JPN)	0–8 Fall	Tomas Johansson (SWE)	0–4 TO
Classification 5th–6th
Panagiotis Poikilidis (GRE)	3–0	René Schiekel (GER)	3–0 PO
Bronze medal match
Petro Kotok (UKR)	0–1	Sergei Mureiko (MDA)	0–3 PO
Gold medal match
Aleksandr Karelin (RUS)	1–0	Matt Ghaffari (USA)	3–0 PO

== Final standing ==
Rank	Athlete
1st place, gold medalist(s)	Aleksandr Karelin (RUS)
2nd place, silver medalist(s)	Matt Ghaffari (USA)
3rd place, bronze medalist(s)	Sergei Mureiko (MDA)
4	Petro Kotok (UKR)
5	Panagiotis Poikilidis (GRE)
6	René Schiekel (GER)
7	Tomas Johansson (SWE)
8	Kenichi Suzuki (JPN)
9	Raoul Dgvareli (TJK)
10	Shermukhammad Kuziev (UZB)
11	Omrane Ayari (TUN)
12	György Kékes (HUN)
13	Yogi Johl (CAN)
14	Juha Ahokas (FIN)
15	Helger Hallik (EST)
16	Laurenţiu Amariei (ROM)
17	Rachid Belaziz (MAR)
18	Guillermo Díaz (MEX)
19	Liu Guoke (CHN)
