= Wrestling at the 1992 Summer Olympics – Men's Greco-Roman 130 kg =

Men's Greco-Roman 130 kg at the Games of the XXV Olympiad
- Venue: Institut Nacional d'Educació Física de Catalunya
- Dates: 27–29 July 1992
- Competitors: 16 from 16 nations

Medalists
1st place, gold medalist(s)		Aleksandr Karelin	Unified Team
2nd place, silver medalist(s)		Tomas Johansson	Sweden
3rd place, bronze medalist(s)		Ioan Grigoraș	Romania

The men's Greco-Roman 130 kilograms at the 1992 Summer Olympics as part of the wrestling program were held at the Institut Nacional d'Educació Física de Catalunya from July 27 to July 29. The wrestlers are divided into 2 groups. The winner of each group decided by a double-elimination system.

== Results ==
=== Elimination A ===
==== Round 1 ====
	Score		CP
Andy Borodow (CAN)	0–5 Fall	Aleksandr Karelin (EUN)	0–4 TO
Bounama Touré (SEN)	0–3 Fall	Cándido Mesa (CUB)	0–4 TO
Milan Radaković (IOP)	7–0 Fall	Guillermo Díaz (MEX)	4–0 TO
Juha Ahokas (FIN)	2–4	Ioan Grigoraș (ROM)	1–3 PP

==== Round 2 ====
	Score		CP
Andy Borodow (CAN)	5–0 Fall	Bounama Touré (SEN)	4–0 TO
Aleksandr Karelin (EUN)	7–0 Fall	Cándido Mesa (CUB)	4–0 TO
Milan Radaković (IOP)	0–2	Juha Ahokas (FIN)	0–3 PO
Guillermo Díaz (MEX)	0–16	Ioan Grigoraș (ROM)	0–4 ST

==== Round 3 ====
	Score		CP
Andy Borodow (CAN)	2–0 Fall	Cándido Mesa (CUB)	4–0 TO
Aleksandr Karelin (EUN)	8–1	Juha Ahokas (FIN)	3–1 PP
Milan Radaković (IOP)	1–8	Ioan Grigoraș (ROM)	1–3 PP

==== Round 4 ====
	Score		CP
Andy Borodow (CAN)	0–4	Ioan Grigoraș (ROM)	0–3 PO
Aleksandr Karelin (EUN)		Bye	

==== Round 5 ====
	Score		CP
Aleksandr Karelin (EUN)	3–0 Fall	Ioan Grigoraș (ROM)	4–0 TO
Andy Borodow (CAN)		Bye	

==== Summary ====
Pos	Athlete	Pld	W	L	R	CP	TP
1	Aleksandr Karelin (EUN)	4	4	0	X (Note: Classification points: EUN 8, ROM 3, CAN 0)	15	23
2	Ioan Grigoraș (ROM)	5	4	1	X	13	32
3	Andy Borodow (CAN)	4	2	2	X	8	7
4	Juha Ahokas (FIN)	3	1	2	3	5	5
5	Milan Radaković (IOP)	3	1	2	3	5	8
—	Cándido Mesa (CUB)	3	1	2	3	4	3
—	Guillermo Díaz (MEX)	2	0	2	2	0	0
—	Bounama Touré (SEN)	2	0	2	2	0	0

Source: Official Report

=== Elimination B ===
==== Round 1 ====
	Score		CP
Panagiotis Poikilidis (GRE)	2–0	Jerzy Choromański (POL)	3–0 PO
Kenichi Suzuki (JPN)	0–4 Fall	Tian Lei (CHN)	0–4 TO
Tomas Johansson (SWE)	0–0	László Klauz (HUN)	0–0 D2
Matt Ghaffari (USA)	0–0	Rangel Gerovski (BUL)	0–0 D2

==== Round 2 ====
	Score		CP
Panagiotis Poikilidis (GRE)	2–0	Kenichi Suzuki (JPN)	3–0 PO
Jerzy Choromański (POL)	2–6	Tian Lei (CHN)	1–3 PP
Tomas Johansson (SWE)	1–0	Matt Ghaffari (USA)	3–0 PO
László Klauz (HUN)	1–0	Rangel Gerovski (BUL)	3–0 PO

==== Round 3 ====
	Score		CP
Panagiotis Poikilidis (GRE)	0–2	Tomas Johansson (SWE)	0–3 PO
Tian Lei (CHN)	1–2	László Klauz (HUN)	1–3 PP

==== Round 4 ====
	Score		CP
Panagiotis Poikilidis (GRE)	1–2	László Klauz (HUN)	1–3 PP
Tian Lei (CHN)	0–6	Tomas Johansson (SWE)	0–3 PO

==== Summary ====
Pos	Athlete	Pld	W	L	R	CP	TP
1	Tomas Johansson (SWE)	4	3	1	X (Note: SWE 0–0 HUN)	9	9
2	László Klauz (HUN)	4	3	1	X	9	5
3	Tian Lei (CHN)	4	2	2	4	8	11
4	Panagiotis Poikilidis (GRE)	4	2	2	4	7	5
5	Jerzy Choromański (POL)	2	0	2	2	1	2
—	Rangel Gerovski (BUL)	2	0	2	2	0	0
—	Kenichi Suzuki (JPN)	2	0	2	2	0	0
—	Matt Ghaffari (USA)	2	0	2	2	0	0

Source: Official Report

=== Finals ===
	Score		CP
9th place match
Milan Radaković (IOP)	2–4	Jerzy Choromański (POL)	1–3 PP
7th place match
Juha Ahokas (FIN)	1–0	Panagiotis Poikilidis (GRE)	3–0 PO
5th place match
Andy Borodow (CAN)	12–0	Tian Lei (CHN)	3.5–0 SO
Bronze medal match
Ioan Grigoraș (ROM)	1–0	László Klauz (HUN)	3–0 PO
Gold medal match
Aleksandr Karelin (EUN)	6–0 Fall	Tomas Johansson (SWE)	4–0 TO

== Final standing ==
Rank	Athlete
1st place, gold medalist(s)	Aleksandr Karelin (EUN)
2nd place, silver medalist(s)	Tomas Johansson (SWE)
3rd place, bronze medalist(s)	Ioan Grigoraș (ROM)
4	László Klauz (HUN)
5	Andy Borodow (CAN)
6	Tian Lei (CHN)
7	Juha Ahokas (FIN)
8	Panagiotis Poikilidis (GRE)
9	Jerzy Choromański (POL)
10	Milan Radaković (IOP)
