= Tomas Johansson (wrestler) =

Swedish Greco-Roman wrestler

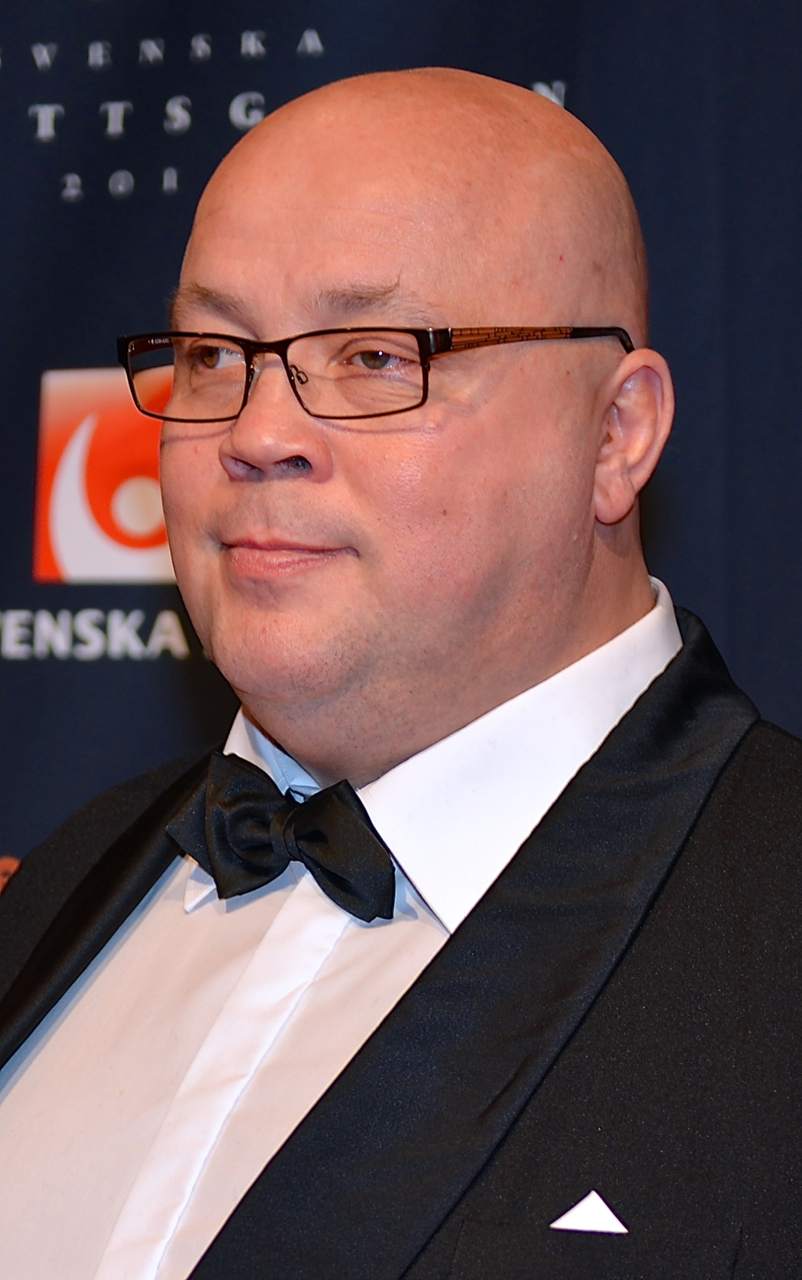
- Tomas Johansson at the Swedish Sports Awards inside the Stockholm Globe Arena in Stockholm, Sweden in January 2014

Personal information
- Nationality: Swedish
- Born: 20 July 1962 (age 63) Haparanda, Sweden
- Height: 193 cm (6 ft 4 in)
- Weight: 130 kg (287 lb)

Sport
- Sport: Wrestling
Medal record
Representing Sweden
Men's Greco-Roman wrestling
Olympic Games
Silver medal – second place	1992 Barcelona	130 kg
Bronze medal – third place	1988 Seoul	130 kg
Disqualified	1984 Los Angeles	+100 kg
World Championships
Gold medal – first place	Budapest 1986	130 kg
Silver medal – second place	Clermont-Ferrand 1987	130 kg
Silver medal – second place	Ostia 1990	130 kg
Bronze medal – third place	Martigny 1989	130 kg
Bronze medal – third place	Stockholm 1993	130 kg
European Championships
Bronze medal – third place	Piraeus 1986	130 kg
Silver medal – second place	Tampere 1987	130 kg
Bronze medal – third place	Kolbotn 1988	130 kg
Bronze medal – third place	Oulu 1989	130 kg
Silver medal – second place	Aschaffenburg 1991	130 kg

Tomas Johansson (born 20 July 1962) is a Swedish wrestler. He was born in Haparanda. He won an Olympic silver medal in Greco-Roman wrestling in 1992, and a bronze medal in 1988. He won a gold medal at the 1986 World Wrestling Championships In 1986 Johansson won the Jerring Award. Johansson's success is overshadowed in controversy after he was found cheating at the 1984 Los Angeles Olympics. He was disqualified, and stripped of his silver medal and later suspended after testing positive for anabolic steroids. He was also a twenty-time Swedish champion, and is considered one of the greatest sportsmen in Swedish history. He was considered to be the dominating force in wrestling until Aleksandr Karelin's arrival in the sport. He ended up being 0–11 against Karelin, with a combined score of 1–74.

== Olympics ==
Tomas Johansson made his Olympic debut in Los Angeles in 1984. His aim was a gold medal, stating before the games that wrestling was one of the sports that had been weakened the most by the Olympic boycott. After losing the final to American Jeffrey Blatnick, Johansson claimed a silver medal. That medal was stripped a couple of days later when it was found that he had tested positive for anabolic steroids. The Swede was banned for 18 months.

In 1988, having won medals in two straight world championships, Johansson was unfortunate to be drawn against the eventual gold medal winner Aleksandr Karelin in the opening match of the Olympic games of Seoul. Johansson lost that bout but went on winning the three next to claim a bronze medal.

During the four next years, leading up to the 1992 Olympics in Barcelona, Tomas Johansson won two more World Championship medals. Every international championship during these years was won by Aleksandr Karelin, so Johansson was fortunate when he was drawn at the opposite side of the Olympic tournament. After an initial tie against Hungarian László Klauz, Johansson won three bouts to reach the gold medal match. Karelin, having won three of his first four games by fall, did this once again, after 93 seconds.

After having won his last World championship medal in 1993, Johansson struggled during the years until the 1996 Olympics. There, he won two of his first four bouts, but losing the other two, thereby reaching a match of 7th and 8th places against Japan's Kenichi Suzuki. Tomas Johansson won this, his final Olympic match, by fall.

Awards
Preceded by Patrik Sjöberg	Svenska Dagbladet Gold Medal; 1986	Succeeded by Swedish men's ice hockey team and Marie-Helene Westin
