= 1994 European Wrestling Championships =

1994 wrestling championships held in Athens

- Host city: Greece, Athens Greco-Roman; Italy, Rome Freestyle
- Dates: 15 – 18 April 1994; 8 – 11 April 1994

Champions
- Freestyle: Russia
- Greco-Roman: Russia

The 1994 European Wrestling Championships were held in the Greco-Romane in Athens 15 – 18 April 1994; the men's Freestyle style in Rome 8 – 11 April 1994.

== Medal table ==
Rank	Nation	Gold	Silver	Bronze	Total
1	Russia	6	1	4	11
2	Armenia	3	3	0	6
3	Turkey	3	2	1	6
4	Ukraine	3	0	5	8
5	Poland	2	0	0	2
6	Germany	1	2	3	6
7	Hungary	1	2	0	3
8	Azerbaijan	1	0	0	1
9	Belarus	0	4	1	5
10	Greece	0	2	1	3
11	Bulgaria	0	1	0	1
11	France	0	1	0	1
11	Israel	0	1	0	1
11	Moldova	0	1	0	1
15	Italy	0	0	1	1
15	Norway	0	0	1	1
15	Romania	0	0	1	1
15	Slovakia	0	0	1	1
15	Sweden	0	0	1	1
Totals (19 entries)		20	20	20	60

== Medal summary ==
=== Men's freestyle ===
Event	Gold	Silver	Bronze
48 kg	Armen Mkrtchyan; Armenia	Reiner Heugabel; Germany	Viktor Yefteni; Ukraine
52 kg	Namig Abdullayev; Azerbaijan	Ivan Tsonov; Bulgaria	Sergey Zambalov; Russia
57 kg	Anushavan Sahakyan; Armenia	Bagavdin Umakhanov; Russia	Aslanbek Fidarov; Ukraine
62 kg	Muharrem Demireğen; Turkey	Araik Baghdadyan; Armenia	Giovanni Schillaci; Italy
68 kg	Vadim Bogiev; Russia	Arayik Gevorgyan; Armenia	Roman Motrovich; Ukraine
74 kg	Nasir Gadžihanov; Russia	Turan Ceylan; Turkey	Alexander Leipold; Germany
82 kg	Rustem Kelejsayev; Russia	Lukman Zhabrailov; Moldova	Hans Gstöttner; Germany
90 kg	Soslan Fraev; Russia	Vladimir Matyushenko; Belarus	Jozef Lohyňa; Slovakia
100 kg	Marek Garmulewicz; Poland	Heiko Balz; Germany	Ali Kayalı; Turkey
130 kg	Mirabi Valiyev; Ukraine	Mahmut Demir; Turkey	Andrey Shumilin; Russia

=== Men's Greco-Roman ===
Event	Gold	Silver	Bronze
48 kg	Zafar Guliev; Russia	József Hamzók; Hungary	Ioannis Agatzanian; Greece
52 kg	Armen Nazaryan; Armenia	Farjat Magueramov; Belarus	Alfred Ter-Mkrtchyan; Germany
57 kg	Şeref Eroğlu; Turkey	Aristidis Rubenian; Greece	Marian Sandu; Romania
62 kg	Hrihoriy Kamyshenko; Ukraine	Aghasi Manukyan; Armenia	Igor Petrenko; Belarus
68 kg	Attila Repka; Hungary	Ghani Yalouz; France	Islam Dugushiev; Russia
74 kg	Erol Koyuncu; Turkey	Vladimir Kopytov; Belarus	Torbjörn Kornbakk; Sweden
82 kg	Thomas Zander; Germany	Gocha Tsitsiashvili; Israel	Sergey Nasevich; Russia
90 kg	Vyacheslav Oliynyk; Ukraine	Sergey Kirilchuk; Belarus	Stig Kleven; Norway
100 kg	Andrzej Wroński; Poland	Petros Triantafyllidis; Greece	Georgiy Saldadze; Ukraine
130 kg	Aleksandr Karelin; Russia	György Kékes; Hungary	Petro Kotok; Ukraine
