= Dippie =

Dippie is a surname. Notable people with the surname include:

- Owen Dippie (fl. 2006), New Zealand street artist
- William Dippie (1907–1997), Scottish cricketer
