= Wrestling at the 1984 Summer Olympics – Men's Greco-Roman +100 kg =

Men's Greco-Roman +100 kg at the Games of the XXIII Olympiad
- Venue: Anaheim Convention Center
- Dates: 31 July–2 August 1984
- Competitors: 8 from 8 nations

Medalists
1st place, gold medalist(s)		Jeff Blatnick	United States
2nd place, silver medalist(s)		Refik Memišević	Yugoslavia
3rd place, bronze medalist(s)		Victor Dolipschi	Romania

The Men's Greco-Roman +100 kg at the 1984 Summer Olympics as part of the wrestling program were held at the Anaheim Convention Center, Anaheim, California.

== Medalists ==
Gold	Jeff Blatnick; United States
Silver	Refik Memišević; Yugoslavia
Bronze	Victor Dolipschi; Romania

== Tournament results ==
The wrestlers are divided into 2 groups. The winner of each group decided by a double-elimination system.

Legend

- TF — Won by Fall
- ST — Won by Technical Superiority, 12 points difference
- PP — Won by Points, 1-7 points difference, the loser with points
- PO — Won by Points, 1-7 points difference, the loser without points
- SP — Won by Points, 8-11 points difference, the loser with points
- SO — Won by Points, 8-11 points difference, the loser without points
- P0 — Won by Passivity, scoring zero points
- P1 — Won by Passivity, while leading by 1-7 points
- PS — Won by Passivity, while leading by 8-11 points
- DC — Won by Decision, 0-0 score
- PA — Won by Opponent Injury
- DQ — Won by Forfeit
- DNA — Did not appear
- L — Losses
- ER — Round of Elimination
- CP — Classification Points
- TP — Technical Points

=== Eliminatory round ===
==== Group A ====
L		CP	TP		L
Round 1
0	Jeff Blatnick (USA)	3-0 P1	5:12	Refik Memišević (YUG)	1
0	Panagiotis Poikilidis (GRE)	3-1 PP	11-7	Masaya Ando (JPN)	1
Round 2
1	Jeff Blatnick (USA)	1-3 PP	3-4	Panagiotis Poikilidis (GRE)	0
1	Refik Memišević (YUG)	3-0 P1	4:52	Masaya Ando (JPN)	2
Final
	Jeff Blatnick (USA)	3-0 P1	5:12	Refik Memišević (YUG)	
	Jeff Blatnick (USA)	1-3 PP	3-4	Panagiotis Poikilidis (GRE)	
	Refik Memišević (YUG)	3.5-0 PS	5:27	Panagiotis Poikilidis (GRE)	

Wrestler	L	ER	CP	Final
Jeff Blatnick (USA)	1	-	4	4
Refik Memišević (YUG)	1	-	3	3.5
Panagiotis Poikilidis (GRE)	0	-	6	3
Masaya Ando (JPN)	2	2	1	

==== Group B ====
L		CP	TP		L
Round 1
1	Antonio La Penna (ITA)	1-3 DC	0-0	Hassan El-Haddad (EGY)	0
1	Victor Dolipschi (ROU)	0-0 DQ	4:52	Tomas Johansson (SWE)	1
Round 2
2	Antonio La Penna (ITA)	0-4 TF	4:24	Victor Dolipschi (ROU)	1
1	Hassan El-Hadad (EGY)	0-4 TF	0:22	Tomas Johansson (SWE)	1
Final
	Victor Dolipschi (ROU)	0-0 DQ	4:52	Tomas Johansson (SWE)	
	Hassan El-Hadad (EGY)	0-4 TF	4:22	Tomas Johansson (SWE)	
	Hassan El-Hadad (EGY)	0-3 P1	3:19	Victor Dolipschi (ROU)	

Wrestler	L	ER	CP	Final
Tomas Johansson (SWE)	1	-	4	4
Victor Dolipschi (ROU)	1	-	4	3
Hassan El-Hadad (EGY)	1	-	3	0
Antonio La Penna (ITA)	2	2	1	

=== Final round ===
	CP	TP	
5th place match
Panagiotis Poikilidis (GRE)	3-1 PP	7-3	Hassan El-Hadad (EGY)
Bronze medal match
Refik Memišević (YUG)	4-0 P1	4:16	Victor Dolipschi (ROU)
Gold medal match
Jeff Blatnick (USA)	3-0 PO	2-0	Tomas Johansson (SWE)

== Final standings ==
1. Jeff Blatnick (USA)
2. Refik Memišević (YUG)
3. Victor Dolipschi (ROU)
4. Panagiotis Poikilidis (GRE)
5. Hassan El-Hadad (EGY)
6. Masaya Ando (JPN) and Antonio La Penna (ITA)

DSQ: Tomas Johansson (SWE)

Johansson originally won the silver medal, but was disqualified after he tested positive for methenolone.
