= Csinger =

Csinger is a Hungarian surname. Notable people with the surname include:

- Gyula Csinger (1905–1978), Hungarian weightlifter
- Márk Csinger (born 2003), Hungarian footballer
