= Milan Radaković =

Yugoslav wrestler (born 1969)

Personal information
- Nationality: Yugoslav
- Born: 28 January 1969 (age 57)

Sport
- Sport: Wrestling

Milan Radaković (born 28 January 1969) is a Yugoslav wrestler. He competed in the men's Greco-Roman 130 kg at the 1992 Summer Olympics.
