= Bill Good (weightlifter) =

American weightlifter (1910–2007)

William Leisey Good
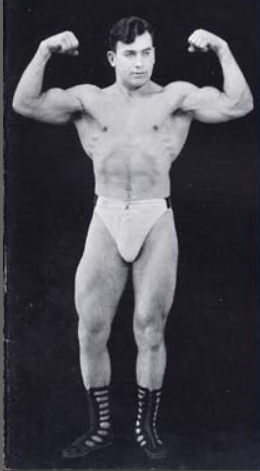
- Born: May 14, 1910; Reamstown, Pennsylvania
- Died: April 19, 2007 (aged 96); Ephrata, Pennsylvania
- Occupation: Weightlifter

William Leisey Good (May 14, 1910 – April 19, 2007) was an American weightlifter who competed in the 1932 Summer Olympics and in the 1936 Summer Olympics.

== Biography ==
He was born in Reamstown, Pennsylvania. He began his weightlifting career in 1928. Good was America's Strongest Man in the 1930s. His brothers Walter Good and Harry Good were also successful weightlifters. The Good brothers claimed the title of the strongest family trio in the United States and were a rival to the famous Saxton brothers of Germany.

In 1932, he finished fourth in the light-heavyweight class. Four years later he finished seventh in the light-heavyweight class at the 1936 Games. He was the first to lift 350 pounds overhead. Good held more than 40 national weightlifting records. He claimed seven AAU titles and won the Middle Atlantic title eight times.

In 1986, Good was inducted into the United States Weightlifting Federation's hall of fame.

Good was employed by Eby Shoe Corporation buildings for 50 years. At age 80 he lifted the Warren L. Travis Bell (2150 pounds). He died in Ephrata, Pennsylvania, age 96.

== Health ==
Good did not take pills or visit doctors. He ate a healthy diet and preferred to eat raw cabbage, grain bread, soybeans, oatmeal and watercress. He would eat raisins and a pint of goat's milk before working out. Good lifted an iron barbell every birthday until he was 85 years old.
