= Wrestling at the 1998 Asian Games – Men's Greco-Roman 130 kg =

Men's Greco-Roman 130 kg at the 1998 Asian Games
- Venue: Thammasat Gymnasium 1
- Dates: 13–14 December 1998
- Competitors: 9 from 9 nations

Medalists
gold medal	Mehdi Sabzali	Iran
silver medal	Shermukhammad Kuziev	Uzbekistan
bronze medal	Zhao Hailin	China

The men's Greco-Roman 130 kilograms wrestling competition at the 1998 Asian Games in Bangkok was held on 13 December and 14 December at the Thammasat Gymnasium 1.

The gold and silver medalists were determined by the final match of the main single-elimination bracket. The losers advanced to the repechage. These matches determined the bronze medalist for the event.

== Schedule ==
All times are Indochina Time (UTC+07:00)

Date	Time	Event
Sunday, 13 December 1998	09:00	Round 1
Sunday, 13 December 1998	16:00	Round 2
Monday, 14 December 1998	09:00	Round 3
Monday, 14 December 1998	09:00	Round 4
Monday, 14 December 1998	16:00	Finals

== Results ==
=== Round 1 ===
	Score		CP
1/8 finals
Zhao Hailin (CHN)	4–0 Fall	Pichai Boonyinglue (THA)	4–0 TO
Minoru Hamaue (JPN)	10–0 Fall	Ariel Bugagao (PHI)	4–0 TO
Hassan Ramdoun (SYR)	0–5	Shermukhammad Kuziev (UZB)	0–3 PO
Yang Young-jin (KOR)	0–0	Adil Karibov (KAZ)	3–0 PO
Mehdi Sabzali (IRI)		Bye	

=== Round 2 ===
	Score		CP
Quarterfinals
Mehdi Sabzali (IRI)	0–0	Zhao Hailin (CHN)	3–0 PO
Minoru Hamaue (JPN)		Bye	
Shermukhammad Kuziev (UZB)		Bye	
Yang Young-jin (KOR)		Bye	
Repechage
Pichai Boonyinglue (THA)	3–10 Fall	Ariel Bugagao (PHI)	0–4 TO
Hassan Ramdoun (SYR)	6–8	Adil Karibov (KAZ)	1–3 PP

=== Round 3 ===
	Score		CP
Semifinals
Mehdi Sabzali (IRI)	3–0	Minoru Hamaue (JPN)	3–0 PO
Shermukhammad Kuziev (UZB)	5–2	Yang Young-jin (KOR)	3–1 PP
Repechage
Ariel Bugagao (PHI)	0–10	Adil Karibov (KAZ)	0–4 ST
Zhao Hailin (CHN)		Bye	

=== Round 4 ===
	Score		CP
Repechage
Minoru Hamaue (JPN)	0–9	Adil Karibov (KAZ)	0–3 PO
Zhao Hailin (CHN)	6–0	Yang Young-jin (KOR)	3–0 PO

=== Finals ===
	Score		CP
Bronze medal match
Adil Karibov (KAZ)	1–4	Zhao Hailin (CHN)	1–3 PP
Gold medal match
Mehdi Sabzali (IRI)	6–3	Shermukhammad Kuziev (UZB)	3–1 PP

== Final standing ==
Rank	Athlete
1st place, gold medalist(s)	Mehdi Sabzali (IRI)
2nd place, silver medalist(s)	Shermukhammad Kuziev (UZB)
3rd place, bronze medalist(s)	Zhao Hailin (CHN)
4	Adil Karibov (KAZ)
5	Minoru Hamaue (JPN)
6	Yang Young-jin (KOR)
7	Ariel Bugagao (PHI)
8	Hassan Ramdoun (SYR)
9	Pichai Boonyinglue (THA)
