= Ioan Grigoraș =

Romanian Greco-Roman wrestler

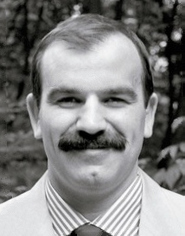

Personal information
- Born: 7 January 1963 (age 63) Bacaia, Romania

Sport
- Sport: Greco-Roman wrestling
- Club: CSM Suceava; CS Dinamo București
Medal record
Representing Romania
Olympic Games
Bronze medal – third place	1992 Barcelona	130 kg
World Championships
Silver medal – second place	1985 Budapest	130 kg
European Championships
Bronze medal – third place	1990 Poznan	130 kg
Silver medal – second place	1992 Copenhagen	130 kg

Ioan Grigoraş (born 7 January 1963) is a retired super-heavyweight Greco-Roman wrestler from Romania. He won a silver medal at the 1985 world and 1992 European Championships and bronze medals at the 1992 Olympics and 1990 European Championships.
