= Petro Kotok =

Ukrainian wrestler (born 1965)

Personal information
- Nationality: Ukrainian
- Born: 28 April 1965 (age 61) Rivne, Ukrainian SSR, Soviet Union

Sport
- Sport: Wrestling
Medal record
Men's Greco-Roman wrestling
Representing Ukraine
World Championships
Bronze medal – third place	1994 Tampere	130 kg
European Championships
Silver medal – second place	1993 Istanbul	130 kg
Silver medal – second place	1996 Budapest	130 kg
Bronze medal – third place	1994 Athens	130 kg

Petro Kotok (born 28 April 1965) is a Ukrainian wrestler. He competed in the men's Greco-Roman 130 kg at the 1996 Summer Olympics.
