= Khadr El-Touni =

Egyptian weightlifter (1916–1956)

Khedr El Touny خضر التوني
- Born: December 15, 1916; Cairo, Egypt
- Died: September 22, 1956 (aged 39); Cairo, Egypt

Khadr El-Touni
Medal record

Representing the Egypt

Men's weightlifting

Olympic Games
Gold medal – first place	1936 Berlin	-75 kg

Khedr Sayed El Touny (Egyptian Arabic: خضر التوني; December 15, 1916 – September 22, 1956) was an Egyptian weightlifter. He was ranked number one on the list of history's 50 greatest weightlifters issued by the International Weightlifting Federation, until Turkey's Naim Süleymanoğlu surpassed the Egyptian to top the list at the 1996 Games in Atlanta.

== 1936 Olympics ==
Eltouny was one of the sensations of the 1936 Olympics. At the time, Eltouny had already set the world record for his weight class. The International Weightlifting Federation, however, did not recognize this as a world record, causing much controversy and anticipation. Many felt that no man could lift such remarkable numbers, while others were excited at the chance to view this human miracle. At the 1936 Olympics, in front of a global audience, Eltouny did not disappoint, as he proved his reported numbers to be accurate, shattering 3 previous Olympic and World records on his way to the gold medal. Eltouny crushed two German world champions at the time on their home soil, who had been widely advertised by Hitler as the stars of the sport. His performance is considered one of the greatest upsets in Olympic history.

After winning the middleweight class gold medal, Eltouny continued to compete for another 45 minutes, finally exceeding the total of the German silver medalist by 35 kg. The 20-year-old Eltouny lifted a total of 387.5 kg, while the German lifted 352.5 kg. Not only had Eltouny lifted more than his middleweight competition, but he actually finished having lifted 15 kg more than the light-heavyweight gold medalist; a feat only Eltouny has accomplished to this day. Eltouny's new world records stood for an unprecedented thirteen years.

Fascinated by Eltouny's performance, Adolf Hitler, who was watching from the stands, rushed down to greet this human miracle. Prior to the competition, Hitler was said to have been sure that Rudolf Ismayr and Adolf Wagner would embarrass all other opponents. While awarding Eltouny with the gold medal, Hitler told him: "Egypt should be proud of you. I wish you were German. I hope you consider Germany your second home". Hitler was so impressed by his domination in the middleweight class that he ordered a street named after Eltouny in Berlin.

Upon returning to Egypt, Eltouny received a 1,000 L.E. cash bonus, as well as a free pass from the tramway company. Eltouny cashed in the policy in 1953 and built a house in Helwan, where the Eltouny family still resides.

== 1948 Olympics ==
Eltouny could have taken part in the 1940 and 1944 Olympics, but World War II put an end to those dreams. Finally in 1948, when the Games resumed in London, Eltouny was able to compete again. Eltouny fell ill the night before the games, and would require surgery. Doctors ordered Eltouny not to compete, but frustrated about missing the prior two Olympic Games, Eltouny refused to follow doctors' orders. Well past his prime at the age of 32, and in terrible pain, Eltouny attempted to win a medal once again. Unfortunately, Eltouny failed to win a medal this time. Although he tied for third place, he lost the bronze medal on tiebreak. Nevertheless, Eltouny won the hearts of the Egyptian people with his determination. Immediately after the competition, Eltouny was rushed to a nearby hospital for surgery.

== Death and legacy ==
Eltouny died in 1956 by electrical shock while making a home repair in Helwan. His performance in 1936 is considered by many to have produced Egypt's most significant gold medal, and his legacy can be felt in various cities. In recognition of his achievements in 1936, Hitler ordered one of the streets in the Olympic Village of Berlin to be named after him. In addition to Berlin, Nasr City in Cairo and the Sporting neighborhood of Alexandria have streets carrying his name. In the 1990s, nearby his final residential town of Helwan, a major square was also named in his honor. Today, he is considered by many to be the greatest athlete in the history of Egyptian sports, having recorded a total of 16 world records, an Olympic gold medal, and 3 world titles (1946, 1949, 1950).

== See also ==
- List of Egyptians
