= Bounama Touré =

Senegalese wrestler

Personal information
- Nationality: Senegalese
- Born: 12 February 1953
- Died: 11 April 2016 (aged 63) Dakar, Senegal

Sport
- Sport: Wrestling

Bounama Touré (12 February 1953 – 11 April 2016) was a Senegalese wrestler. He competed in the men's Greco-Roman 130 kg at the 1992 Summer Olympics.
