= Weightlifting at the 1936 Summer Olympics – Men's 75 kg =

Weightlifting at the Olympics

The men's middleweight event was part of the weightlifting programme at the 1936 Summer Olympics. The weight class was the third-lightest contested, and allowed weightlifters of up to 75 kilograms (165 pounds). The competition was held on Wednesday, 5 August 1936.

== Medalists ==
Gold	Silver	Bronze
Khadr El-Touni; Egypt	Rudolf Ismayr; Germany	Adolf Wagner; Germany

== Records ==
These were the standing world and Olympic records (in kilograms) prior to the 1936 Summer Olympics.

World Record	Press	117.5	(Egypt) Khadr El-Touni	Berlin (GER)	5 August 1936
World Record	Snatch	120	(Egypt) Khadr El-Touni	Berlin (GER)	5 August 1936
World Record	Clean & Jerk				
World Record	Total				
Olympic Record	Press	117.5	(Egypt) Khadr El-Touni	Berlin (GER)	5 August 1936
Olympic Record	Snatch	120	(Egypt) Khadr El-Touni	Berlin (GER)	5 August 1936
Olympic Record	Clean & Jerk	150	(Egypt) Khadr El-Touni	Berlin (GER)	5 August 1936
Olympic Record	Total	387.5	(Egypt) Khadr El-Touni	Berlin (GER)	5 August 1936

Khadr El-Touni set a new Olympic record in press, snatch and in clean and jerk.

== Results ==
All figures in kilograms.

Place	Weightlifter	Press			Snatch			Clean & jerk			Total
Place	Weightlifter	1.	2.	3.	1.	2.	3.	1.	2.	3.	Total
1	Khadr El-Touni (EGY)	107.5	115	117.5 WR	107.5	115	120 WR	140	150 OR	X (155)	387.5 OR
2	Rudolf Ismayr (GER)	102.5	107.5	X (110)	102.5	X (110)	X (110)	135	140	142.5	352.5
3	Adolf Wagner (GER)	97.5	X (105)	X (105)	105	X (110)	112.5	135	X (140)	142.5	352.5
4	Anton Hangel (AUT)	90	95	X (97.5)	105	X (110)	110	130	137.5	X (140)	342.5
5	Stanley Kratkowski (USA)	90	95	X (97.5)	X (102.5)	102.5	107.5	135	X (140)	X (140)	337.5
6	Hans Valla (AUT)	97.5	102.5	X (105)	97.5	102.5	X (105)	130	X (135)	X (140)	335.0
7	Carlo Galimberti (ITA)	100	X (105)	X (105)	97.5	102.5	X (105)	130	X (132.5)	-	332.5
8	Pierre Alleene (FRA)	85	90	X (92.5)	100	105	X (107.5)	130	135	X (137.5)	330.0
9	Stefan Lindeberg (SWE)	85	90	X (92.5)	95	102.5	X (110)	130	X (135)	135	327.5
10	Josef Hantych (TCH)	80	85	X (87.5)	97.5	105	107.5	X (125)	130	135	327.5
11	Régis Lepreux (FRA)	X (90)	X (90)	90	95	100	X (105)	120	125	X (130)	315.0
12	Harold Laurance (GBR)	82.5	X (87.5)	90	90	95	X (97.5)	122.5	X (130)	130	315.0
13	Albert Aeschmann (SUI)	90	95	X (97.5)	90	95	X (97.5)	120	125	X (130)	315.0
14	Walter Good (USA)	90	95	X (97.5)	X (95)	95	X (100)	125	X (130)	X (130)	315.0
15	Zaw Weik (IND)	82.5	87.5	X (90)	X (95)	95	X (100)	122.5	X (130)	X (130)	310.0
16	Gyula Csinger (HUN)	X (85)	85	-	85	-	-	115	X (120)	120	290.0
WD	René A. Ambroise (HAI)	Withdrew due to injury									

== Sources ==
- Olympic Report
