= Raoul Dgvareli =

Tajikistani wrestler

Personal information
- Nationality: Tajikistani
- Born: 9 January 1965 (age 61)

Sport
- Sport: Wrestling

Raoul Dgvareli (born 9 January 1965) is a Tajikistani wrestler. He competed in the men's Greco-Roman 130 kg at the 1996 Summer Olympics.
