= Yogi Johl =

Canadian wrestler

Yogi Singh Johl
Personal information
- Nationality: Canadian
- Born: 3 January 1970 (age 56) Vancouver, British Columbia, Canada

Sport
- Sport: Wrestling

Herbinder Singh “Yogi” Johl (born 3 January 1970) is a Canadian wrestler. He competed in the men's Greco-Roman 130 kg at the 1996 Summer Olympics.
