= Jerzy Choromański =

Polish wrestler

Personal information
- Nationality: Polish
- Born: 16 December 1954 (age 71) Białystok, Poland

Sport
- Sport: Wrestling

Jerzy Choromański (born 16 December 1954) is a Polish wrestler. He competed in the men's Greco-Roman 130 kg at the 1992 Summer Olympics.
