= Cándido Mesa =

Cuban wrestler (born 1964)

Personal information
- Born: 2 February 1964 (age 62) Havana, Cuba

Sport
- Sport: Wrestling

Cándido Mesa (born 2 February 1964) is a Cuban wrestler. He competed in the men's Greco-Roman 130 kg at the 1992 Summer Olympics.
