= Tian Lei (wrestler) =

Chinese wrestler

Personal information
- Full name: Chinese: 田雷; pinyin: Tián Léi
- Nationality: Chinese
- Born: 30 November 1970 (age 55)

Sport
- Sport: Wrestling

Tian Lei (born 30 November 1970) is a Chinese wrestler. He competed in the men's Greco-Roman 130 kg at the 1992 Summer Olympics.
