= Rashid Bel Aziz =

Moroccan wrestler

Personal information
- Nationality: Moroccan
- Born: 2 November 1967 (age 58)

Sport
- Sport: Wrestling

Rashid Bel Aziz (born 2 November 1967) is a Moroccan wrestler. He competed in the men's Greco-Roman 130 kg at the 1996 Summer Olympics.
