= René Schiekel =

German wrestler

Personal information
- Nationality: German
- Born: 25 August 1966 (age 59) Lübz, East Germany

Sport
- Sport: Wrestling

René Schiekel (born 25 August 1966) is a German former wrestler. He competed in the men's Greco-Roman 130 kg at the 1996 Summer Olympics.
