= Pierre Alleene =

French weightlifter

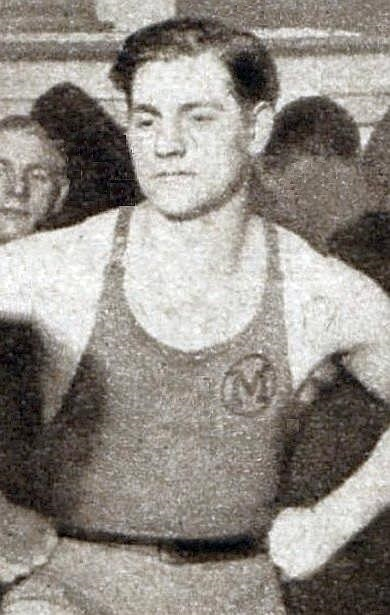
- Pierre Alleene in 1933

Personal information
- Nationality: French
- Born: 19 July 1909; Roubaix, France
- Died: 1 August 1994 (aged 85)

Sport
- Sport: Weightlifting

Pierre Alleene (19 July 1909 – 1 August 1994) was a French weightlifter. He competed in the men's middleweight event at the 1936 Summer Olympics.
