= Régis Lepreux =

French weightlifter

Personal information
- Full name: Régis Gustave Lepreux
- Nationality: French
- Born: 28 March 1913; Béthencourt, France
- Died: 10 August 1979 (aged 66); Cambrai, France

Sport
- Sport: Weightlifting

Régis Gustave Lepreux (28 March 1913 – 10 August 1979) was a French weightlifter. He competed in the men's middleweight event at the 1936 Summer Olympics.
