= Laurențiu Amariei =

Romanian wrestler

Personal information
- Nationality: Romanian
- Born: 2 July 1973 (age 53)

Sport
- Sport: Wrestling

Laurențiu Amariei (born 2 July 1973) is a Romanian wrestler. He competed in the men's Greco-Roman 130 kg at the 1996 Summer Olympics.
