= Andy Barbe =

Canadian ice hockey player

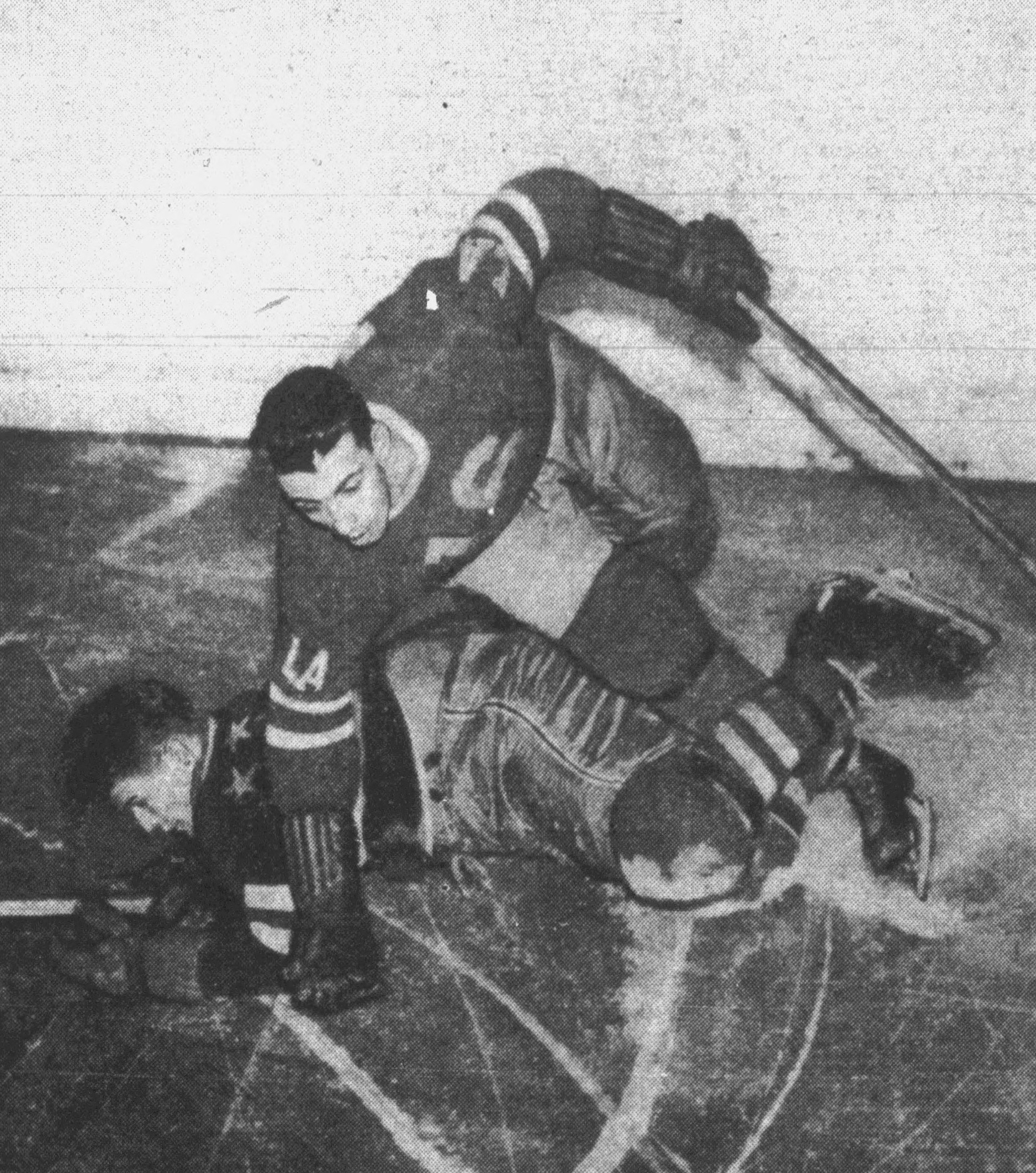
- Barbe (above) after tripping over Hollywood Wolves defenseman Les Vickery (below) on 12 February 1947.
- Born: July 27, 1923 Coniston, Ontario, Canada
- Died: January 15, 2004 (aged 80) Canonsburg, Pennsylvania, U.S.
- Height: 6 ft 0 in (183 cm)
- Weight: 170 lb (77 kg; 12 st 2 lb)
- Position: Right wing
- Shot: Right
- Played for: Toronto Maple Leafs
- Playing career: 1944–1955

Andre Joseph Barbe (July 27, 1923 – January 15, 2004) was a Canadian professional ice hockey right winger who played in one National Hockey League game for the Toronto Maple Leafs during the 1950–51 season. The rest of his career, which lasted from 1944 to 1955, was spent in the minor leagues.

== Career statistics ==
=== Regular season and playoffs ===
			Regular season					Playoffs
Season	Team	League	GP	G	A	Pts	PIM	GP	G	A	Pts	PIM
1941–42	Falconbridge Falcons	NOJHA	8	3	3	6	6	2	0	0	0	10
1944–45	Sudbury Open Pit Miners	NOHA	8	4	4	8	9	3	1	2	3	0
1945–46	Oakland Oaks	PCHL	40	11	11	22	76	—	—	—	—	—
1946–47	Los Angeles Monarchs	PCHL	59	55	39	94	55	—	—	—	—	—
1947–48	Los Angeles Monarchs	PCHL	57	42	38	80	95	—	—	—	—	—
1948–49	Los Angeles Monarchs	PCHL	70	42	35	77	32	7	5	2	7	0
1949–50	Pittsburgh Hornets	AHL	64	25	8	33	12	—	—	—	—	—
1950–51	Pittsburgh Hornets	AHL	67	23	28	51	20	13	9	5	14	0
1950–51	Toronto Maple Leafs	NHL	1	0	0	0	2	—	—	—	—	—
1951–52	Pittsburgh Hornets	AHL	68	22	40	62	16	11	3	6	9	2
1952–53	Pittsburgh Hornets	AHL	29	14	21	35	4	6	2	3	5	14
1953–54	Pittsburgh Hornets	AHL	67	25	36	61	8	5	0	1	1	2
1954–55	Pittsburgh Hornets	AHL	57	19	20	39	10	7	0	2	2	2
PCHL totals			226	150	123	273	258	7	5	2	7	0
AHL totals			352	128	153	281	70	42	14	17	31	20
NHL totals			1	0	0	0	2	—	—	—	—	—

== See also ==
- List of players who played only one game in the NHL
