= Owen Dippie =

New Zealand street artist

- Born: Kawerau, New Zealand
- Occupation: Artist
- Years active: ~2006–present
- Known for: "Ninja Renaissance Masters", Huffington Post's Brooklyn Street Art's most popular mural in 2015
- Spouse: Erin Dippie

Owen Dippie is a New Zealand street artist. He has mural works on exterior building walls in Auckland, Brooklyn, and Los Angeles. He is also involved with mental-health and suicide awareness outreach, and breast cancer research fundraising.

== Gallery ==
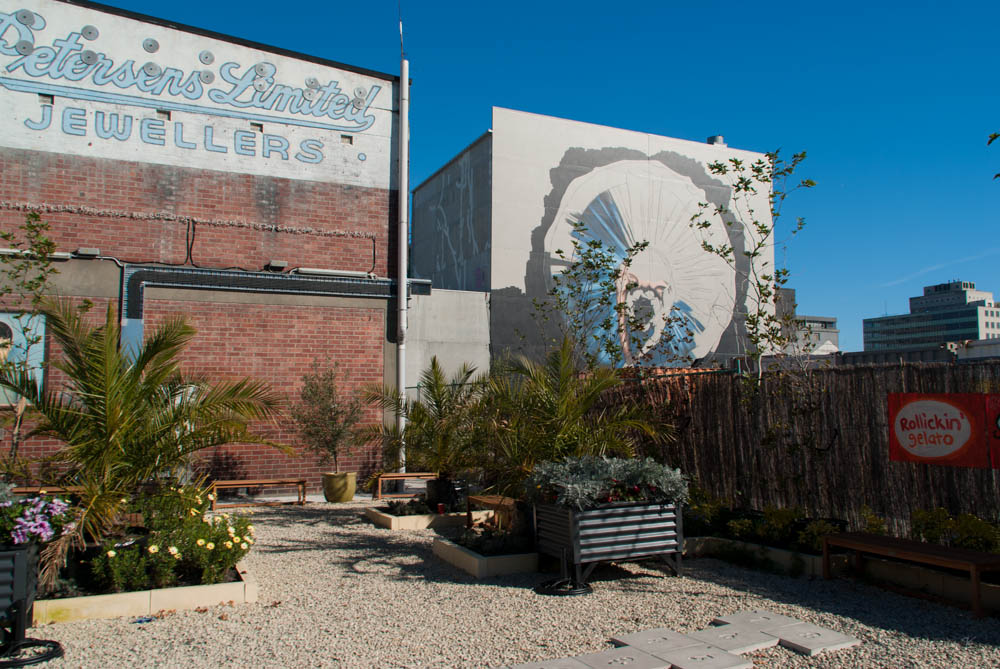
The ballerina of Christchurch (pictured in progress), Christchurch
