= Walter Good =

American weightlifter (1908–2001)

Personal information
- Born: January 27, 1908 Reamstown, Pennsylvania, United States
- Died: July 8, 2001 (aged 93) Reading, Pennsylvania, United States

Sport
- Sport: Weightlifting

Walter Good (January 27, 1908 – July 8, 2001) was an American weightlifter. He competed in the men's middleweight event at the 1936 Summer Olympics.

His brother Bill Good was also an Olympic weightlifter.
