= Masaya Ando =

Japanese wrestler (born 1960)

Masaya Ando (安藤 正哉, Andō Masaya; born 23 February 1960) is a Japanese former wrestler who competed in the 1984 Summer Olympics.
