= Paul Anxionnaz =

French politician

- Born: 31 December 1903; Aime, Savoie, France
- Died: February 20, 1997 (aged 93); Louveciennes, France
- Political party: Radical Party (France)

Paul Anxionnaz (31 December 1902 – 20 February 1997) was a French politician and Grand master of Grand Orient de France in 1964 and 1965.

== Life ==
Anxionnaz was born in Aime. He represented the Radical Party in the National Assembly from 1946 to 1951 and from 1956 to 1958.
