= Mario Zucchini =

Italian ice hockey player

Personal information
- Nationality: Italian
- Born: 5 July 1910; Palata, Italy
- Died: 3 February 1997 (aged 86); Plymouth, Massachusetts, United States

Sport
- Sport: Ice hockey

Mario Vincenzo Zucchini (5 July 1910 – 3 February 1997) was an Italian ice hockey player. He competed in the men's tournament at the 1936 Winter Olympics.
