= Gyula Csinger =

Hungarian weightlifter

Personal information
- Nationality: Hungarian
- Born: 12 May 1905; Nemesócsa, Austria-Hungary
- Died: 13 November 1978 (aged 73); Budapest, Hungary

Sport
- Sport: Weightlifting

Gyula Csinger (12 May 1905 – 13 November 1978) was a Hungarian weightlifter. He competed in the men's middleweight event at the 1936 Summer Olympics.
