= Norm Couper =

Australian rules footballer

Personal information
- Full name: Norman William Couper
- Born: 2 August 1916; Emerald, Victoria
- Died: 28 February 1997 (aged 80)
- Height: 180 cm (5 ft 11 in)
- Weight: 82 kg (181 lb)

Playing career^{1}
Years	Club	Games (Goals)
1939–1940	South Melbourne	12 (4)
- ^{1} Playing statistics correct to the end of 1940.

Norman William Couper (2 August 1916 – 28 February 1997) was an Australian rules footballer who played with South Melbourne in the Victorian Football League (VFL).
