= Arthur Kristiansen =

Norwegian ice hockey player

Personal information
- Born: 18 July 1923 Oslo, Norway
- Died: 7 July 2001 (aged 77) Bærum, Norway

Sport
- Sport: Ice hockey

Arthur Kristiansen (18 July 1923 – 7 July 2001) was a Norwegian ice hockey player, born in Oslo, Norway. He played for the Norwegian national ice hockey team, and participated at the Winter Olympics in 1952, where the Norwegian team placed 9th.
