= Harold Laurance =

British weightlifter

Personal information
- Nationality: British
- Born: 1 July 1915; Yardley Hastings, England
- Died: 17 January 2004 (aged 88); Kettering, England

Sport
- Sport: Weightlifting

Harold Laurance (1 July 1915 – 17 January 2004) was a British weightlifter. He competed in the men's middleweight event at the 1936 Summer Olympics.
