= Refik Memišević =

Yugoslav wrestler (1956–2004)

Personal information
- Born: 14 May 1956 Bačko Novo Selo, SR Serbia, SFR Yugoslavia
- Died: 4 January 2004 (aged 47) Subotica, Serbia and Montenegro

Sport
- Sport: Wrestling
Medal record
Representing Yugoslavia
Olympic Games
Silver medal – second place	1984 Los Angeles	+100 kg
World Championships
Gold medal – first place	1981 Oslo	+100 kg
Silver medal – second place	1977 Gothenburg	-100 kg
Silver medal – second place	1982 Katowice	+100 kg
Bronze medal – third place	1978 Mexico City	-100 kg
Summer Universiade
Silver medal – second place	1981 Bucharest	+100 kg
Mediterranean Games
Gold medal – first place	1979 Split	-100 kg
Gold medal – first place	1983 Casablanca	+100 kg

Refik Memišević (14 May 1956 – 4 January 2004) was a Yugoslav wrestler who competed in the 1980 Summer Olympics and in the 1984 Summer Olympics.
