= György Kékes =

Hungarian wrestler

Personal information
- Nationality: Hungarian
- Born: 21 June 1966 (age 60) Budapest, Hungary

Sport
- Sport: Wrestling

György Kékes (born 21 June 1966) is a Hungarian wrestler. He competed in the men's Greco-Roman 130 kg at the 1996 Summer Olympics.
