= François De Deken =

Belgian footballer

Personal information
- Date of birth: 11 September 1912
- Place of birth: Schoten, Belgium
- Date of death: 24 January 2004 (aged 91)

International career
Years	Team	Apps	(Gls)
1936	Belgium	1	(0)

François De Deken (11 September 1912 – 24 January 2004) was a Belgian footballer. He played in one match for the Belgium national football team in 1936.
