= Anushavan Sahakyan =

Armenian freestyle wrestler

Personal information
- Born: 23 January 1972 (age 54) Yerevan, Armenian SSR, Soviet Union
- Height: 1.57 m (5 ft 2 in)
- Weight: 57 kg (126 lb)

Sport
- Sport: Wrestling
- Event: Freestyle
- Club: Malatia Yerevan
- Coached by: Yuri Babayan
Medal record
Men's freestyle wrestling
Representing Armenia
European Championships
Gold medal – first place	1994 Rome	57 kg

Anushavan Sahakyan (Armenian: Անուշավան Սահակյան, born 23 January 1972) is a retired Armenian Freestyle wrestler. He became a European Champion in 1994.

== Biography ==
Sahakyan was born on 23 January 1972 in Yerevan. He began to practice freestyle wrestling at the age of 12 under the coaching of Yuri Babayan. In 1990 he became a Junior World Champion.

From 1993 to 1999, he was a member of the national freestyle wrestling team of Armenia. The largest success in his career was winning the gold medal at the 1994 European Wrestling Championships. In the finals he defeated Russian Bagavdin Umakhanov, a two-time European Champion. Sahakyan and Armen Mkrtchyan are both the first ever European Wrestling Champions in freestyle wrestling from the independent Republic of Armenia.

He finished his career in 1999. Since 2010 he has been coaching at the Yerevan wrestling club Malatia named after Vahan Zatikyan. From 2010 to 2012 he coached European Championship medalist Grigor Grigoryan.
