= Surender Kumar Malik =

Indian mathematician

- Born: 8 September 1942
- Died: 7 July 2001 (aged 58)
- Education: Delhi University
- Awards: Shanti Swarup Bhatnagar Prize for Science and Technology
- Scientific career
- Fields: Applied mathematics, nonlinear phenomena
- Workplaces: Panjab University, Chandigarh

Surender Kumar Malik (8 September 1942 – 7 July 2001) was an Indian mathematician who specialised in applied mathematics, especially in nonlinear phenomena.

He was awarded in 1983 with the Shanti Swarup Bhatnagar Prize for Science and Technology, the highest science award in India, in the mathematical sciences category.

Malik did pioneering work on nonlinear dispersive waves in self-gravitating media, electrohydrodynamics and magnetohydrodynamics. In particular his theory on nonlinear breakup of a self-gravitating column has thrown some light on the phenomenon of condensation in astronomical bodies. His work on nonlinear self-focussing in magnetic fluids is expected to have industrial applications.
