= Ted McCarthy =

Australian rules footballer, born 1911

Personal information
- Full name: Edward Joseph McCarthy
- Born: 19 March 1911; Wangaratta, Victoria
- Died: 10 February 1997 (aged 85)
- Original team: Hopetoun
- Height: 175 cm (5 ft 9 in)

Playing career^{1}
| Years | Club | Games (Goals) |
| 1933 | St Kilda | 2 (0) |
- ^{1} Playing statistics correct to the end of 1933.

Edward Joseph McCarthy (19 March 1911 – 10 February 1997) was an Australian rules footballer who played with St Kilda in the Victorian Football League (VFL).

McCarthy played for Collingullie Football Club in 1933, playing a great game in their losing Wagga Australian Rules Football League grand final side to Wagga Wagga FC.
