= John Currie (Australian footballer) =

Australian rules footballer

Personal information
- Full name: John Currie
- Born: 13 June 1931
- Died: 23 February 1997 (aged 65)
- Original team: Glen Orme
- Height: 191 cm (6 ft 3 in)
- Weight: 89 kg (196 lb)

Playing career^{1}
Years	Club	Games (Goals)
1952	Richmond	3 (1)
- ^{1} Playing statistics correct to the end of 1952.

John Currie (13 June 1931 – 23 February 1997) was a former Australian rules footballer who played with Richmond in the Victorian Football League (VFL).
