= Mohammad Moustafa Haddara =

Arabic scholar (1930–1997)

- محمد مصطفى هدارة
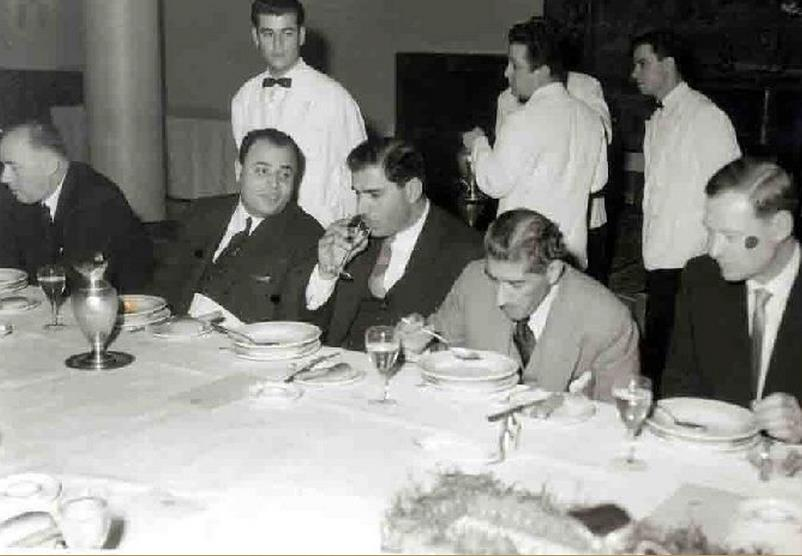
- Prof. Haddara the Arab's league Cultural Attaché at the time, at a dinner held by the UNESCO's Director-General René Maheu (on his right) in Beirut.

Mohammad Moustafa Haddara (Arabic: محمد مصطفى هدارة; 1930 – February 28, 1997) was an Egyptian Arabic scholar. Haddara was a distinguished professor of Arabic literature, at Alexandria University, Egypt, and a professor at King Saud University, Riyadh, Saudi Arabia.

After leaving his diplomatic position as the Cultural Attaché of the Arab League, Haddara devoted his time to the academic field. Haddara held the positions of dean of the Faculty of Arts, Tanta University, and vice dean for post-graduate studies, Faculty of Arts, Alexandria University. Moreover, Haddara was a visiting professor at University of Shanghai, China, Bonn University, Germany, Umdorman University in Sudan, University of Tokyo, Japan, and many other regional and international universities.

Haddara held the head of department position in various departments, including Arabic, Theater, Phonetics, and Oriental Languages Departments at Alexandria University, Ain Shams University, Tanta University, and other international universities.

Haddara authored one historical novel called El mansoura, named after the Egyptian city El-Mansoura, and a total of 16 books in the field of Arabic literature and criticism. Haddara edited numerous books, and translated 5 books to Arabic language including Islam by the Arabist scholar Alfred Guillaume, and the Japanese Hiroshima Diary by Michihiko Hachiya. Moreover, he has translated 3 international novels. He also wrote numerous articles in national and international academic journals, conferences, magazines, and newspapers.

Haddara has supervised 81 master theses and 88 doctorate theses in national, regional, and international universities. He is widely recognized as one of the best scholars of the Arabic literature in the modern era.

== Honors and titles ==
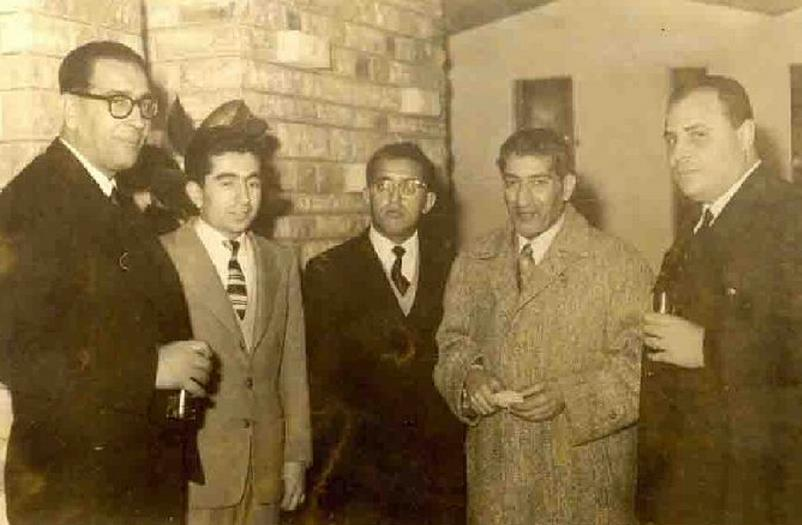
Prof. Haddara with the Lebanese Minister of Culture Fouad Boutros in a reception held at the Lebanese Ministry of Culture in Lebanon. 11-03-1960

- Visiting Professor at King Faisal University, Om- El Kora University, Arabic University (Lebanon), Yarmouk University (Jordan), Kuwait University, Emarat University (UAE), Foreign Languages Institute (China), Geissen University (Germany), and Bonn University (Germany).
- Member of the board of trustees of Babteen Prize of Poetry.
- Criticism member of the high council of culture in Egypt.
- Member of the Egyptian Writers Union.
- Elrafie Magazine Advisor.
- Founder of the Novel Club, Alexandria, Egypt.
- "Country's Encouragement Award", Egypt.
- The Knight of Cultural Palaces", Egypt.
- "Mohammad Hassan Feqy's Award", Yemen.
- "Mohammad Soud Al-Babteen Award", Saudi Arabia.
- "Sadam Hussein Prize for Literature", Iraq.
- "Prince of Kuwait Prize", Kuwait.
