= Maria Sołtan =

Polish fencer (1921–2001)

Personal information
- Born: 24 February 1921 Kraków, Poland
- Died: 24 July 2001 (aged 80) Kraków, Poland

Sport
- Sport: Fencing

Maria Sołtan (24 February 1921 – 24 July 2001) was a Polish fencer. She competed in the women's individual foil event at the 1952 Summer Olympics.
