= Antonio La Penna =

Italian wrestler

Antonio Lapenna (born 17 October 1960 in Rome) is an Italian former wrestler who competed in the 1980 Summer Olympics and in the 1984 Summer Olympics.
