= Karsten Johannesen =

Norwegian footballer (1920-1997)

Personal information
- Date of birth: 17 January 1920
- Date of death: 2 February 1997 (aged 77)

International career
Years	Team	Apps	(Gls)
1947	Norway	1	(0)

Karsten Johannesen (17 January 1920 – 2 February 1997) was a Norwegian footballer. He played in one match for the Norway national football team in 1947.
