= Rudolf Ismayr =

German weightlifter (1908–1998)

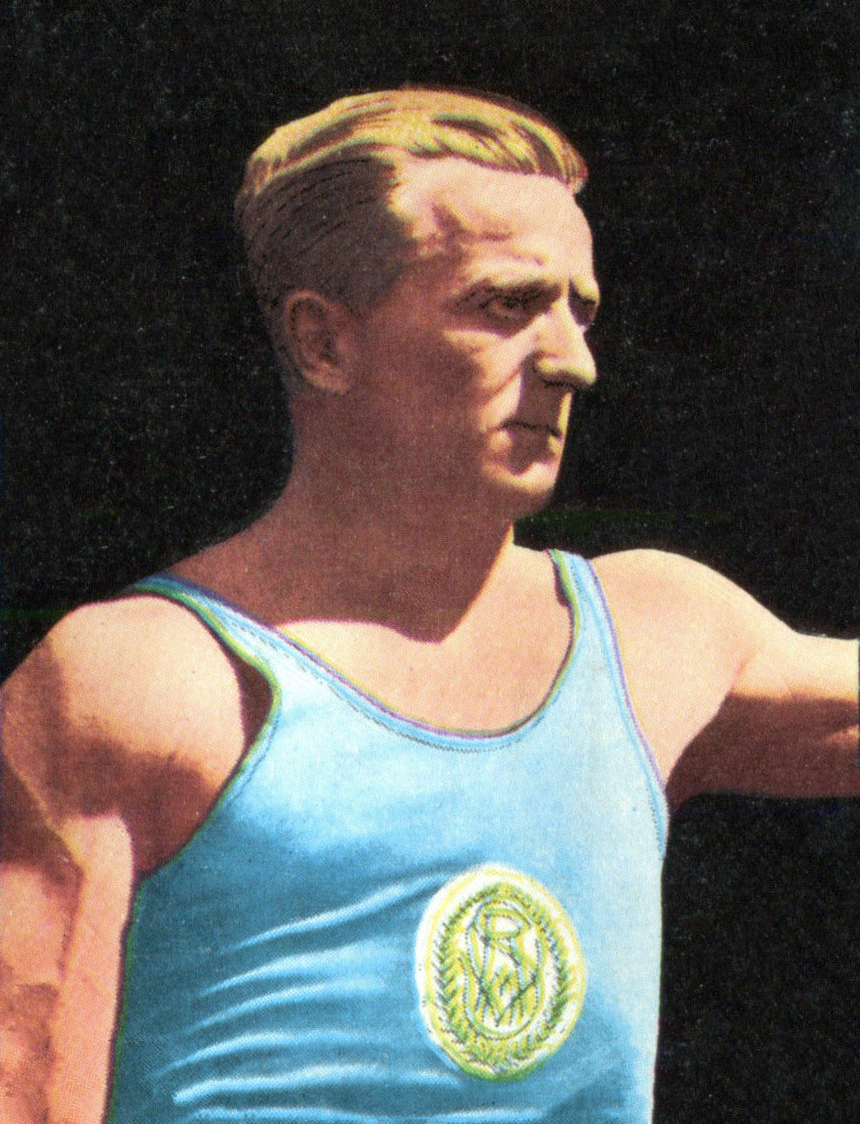

Personal information
- Born: 14 October 1908 Landshut, Germany
- Died: 9 May 1998 (aged 89) Marquartstein, Bavaria, Germany

Sport
- Sport: Weightlifting
- Club: SC Roland München
Medal record
Representing Germany
Olympic Games
Gold medal – first place	1932 Los Angeles	-75 kg
Silver medal – second place	1936 Berlin	-75 kg
World Championships
Silver medal – second place	1938 Vienna	-75 kg

Rudolf Ismayr (14 October 1908 – 9 May 1998) was a German weightlifter. He won a gold medal at the 1932 Summer Olympics in Los Angeles and a silver medal at the 1936 Summer Olympics in Berlin, as well as a silver medal at the 1938 World Championships. Between 1931 and 1935 he set five official and six unofficial world records.

Ismayr took the Olympic Oath at the 1936 Summer Olympics in Berlin. Death unspecified.
