= Guillermo Díaz (wrestler) =

Mexican wrestler (born 1964)

Personal information
- Nationality: Mexican
- Born: 29 September 1964 (age 60)

Sport
- Sport: Wrestling

Guillermo Díaz (born 29 September 1964) is a Mexican wrestler. He competed at the 1992 Summer Olympics and the 1996 Summer Olympics.
