= William Dippie =

Scottish cricketer

Personal information
- Full name: William Russell Hennessy Dippie
- Born: 9 June 1907; Edinburgh, Midlothian, Scotland
- Died: 15 February 1997 (aged 89); Dudley, Worcestershire, England
- Batting: Right-handed
- Bowling: Right-arm fast-medium

Domestic team information
- Years: Team
- 1939: Scotland

Career statistics
Competition	First-class
Matches	1
Runs scored	7
Batting average	7.00
100s/50s	–/–
Top score	7*
Balls bowled	200
Wickets	3
Bowling average	23.66
5 wickets in innings	–
10 wickets in match	–
Best bowling	3/41
Catches/stumpings	1/–
- Source: Cricinfo, 2 November 2022

William Russell Hennessy Dippie (9 June 1907 – 15 February 1997) was a Scottish first-class cricketer.

Dippie was born at Edinburgh in June 1907. A club cricketer for Brunswick, he made a single appearance in first-class cricket for Scotland against Ireland at Dublin in 1939. Playing in the Scottish team as a right-arm fast-medium bowler, he went wicketless in the Irish first innings, but took figures of 3 for 41. As a lower order batsman, he ended the Scottish first innings unbeaten on 7 runs, while in their second innings he was dismissed without scoring by James Boucher. Outside of cricket, he was by profession an electrician. Dippie died in England at Dudley in February 1997.
