= Panagiotis Poikilidis =

Greek wrestler (1965–2014)

Panagiotis Poikilidis (Παναγιώτης Ποικιλίδης, 27 February 1965 – 23 May 2014) was a Greek wrestler from Thessaloniki, Macedonia, Greece. He competed at three Olympic Games, 1984, 1992 and 1996 in the Super-heavyweight division, finishing fourth in 1984, eighth in 1992, and fifth in 1996. Poikilidis won the gold medal in 1991 Mediterranean Games, and the bronze in 1987 Mediterranean Games. He took the fourth place in 1984 Olympic Games, but he beat the gold medalist Jeff Blatnick at the first round.

On 21 May 2014, while at a local hospital for check-ups, he suffered an aortic aneurysm and underwent emergency open-heart surgery. Despite initially showing signs of improvement, two days later he suffered complications including a brain hemorrhage from which he never recovered, and he died on the evening of 23 May at the age of 49.

== Personal ==
His brother was the wrestler Georgios Poikilidis.
