= Josef Hantych =

Czech weightlifter

Personal information
- Nationality: Czech
- Born: 12 February 1911
- Died: 28 February 1997 (aged 86)

Sport
- Sport: Weightlifting

Josef Hantych (12 February 1911 – 28 February 1997) was a Czech weightlifter. He competed at the 1936 Summer Olympics and the 1952 Summer Olympics.
