= Jeff Blatnick =

American wrestler (1957–2012)

Personal information
- Born: July 26, 1957 Niskayuna, New York, U.S.
- Died: October 24, 2012 (aged 55) Schenectady, New York, U.S.

Sport
- Country: United States
- Sport: Greco-Roman, Freestyle, and Folkstyle
- College team: Springfield College
- Club: Adirondack Wrestling Association
- Team: USA
- Coached by: Ronald Finley
Medal record
Representing the United States
Men's Greco-Roman wrestling
Olympic Games
Gold medal – first place	1984 Los Angeles	+100 kg
World Cup
Silver medal – second place	1980 Trelleborg	+100 kg
Bronze medal – third place	1987 Albany	130 kg
Men's freestyle wrestling
Representing United States
Junior World Championships
Bronze medal – third place	1977 Las Vegas	100 kg
Junior Pan American Championships
Gold medal – first place	1979 San Luis Potosí	100 kg
Collegiate Wrestling
Representing Springfield College
NCAA Division I Championships
Bronze medal – third place	1979 Ames	Heavyweight
NCAA Division II Championships
Gold medal – first place	1978 Cedar Falls	Heavyweight
Gold medal – first place	1979 Brookings	Heavyweight
Silver medal – second place	1977 Cedar Falls	Heavyweight

Jeffrey Carl Blatnick (July 26, 1957 – October 24, 2012) was an American super heavyweight Greco-Roman wrestler and sports commentator. He won NCAA Division II heavyweight wrestling championships in 1978 and 1979 and won the Olympic gold medal in Greco-Roman wrestling in 1984 after battling back from cancer. During his wrestling days, he and Dan Severn were on the same U.S. National Wrestling Team.

As a commentator, Blatnick worked UFC 4 through UFC 32 for the Ultimate Fighting Championship. He also served as the UFC commissioner and was instrumental in helping the UFC get regulated by the athletic commissions, which kept the sport of mixed martial arts alive during its Dark Ages in the United States at the time. Blatnick is among the people credited with giving the sport of mixed martial arts its name.

He served as an MMA judge for the New Jersey athletic commission.

== Early life ==
Blatnick grew up in Niskayuna, New York, outside Schenectady. His older brother Dave, whom Jeff considered his best friend and biggest booster, died in a 1977 motorcycle accident.

== Wrestling ==
Blatnick began his career wrestling in 1973 at Niskayuna High School in Niskayuna, New York. While wrestling for Niskayuna, Blatnick became the state heavyweight champion in 1975. After graduating from Niskayuna, he attended and wrestled for Springfield College in Springfield, Massachusetts, where he was a three-time All-American. After winning national titles in NCAA Division II, he qualified for the 1980 Olympic team, but did not get a chance to compete because the USA boycotted the games. In 1982, he was diagnosed with Hodgkin's lymphoma, prompting the removal of his spleen and appendix.

After radiation therapy helped to hold the cancer in remission, Blatnick competed in and won a gold medal in the 1984 Olympic Games in Los Angeles, California. Immediately after winning gold he was interviewed by the media. He tried to thank many of those who had helped him over the years, but was crying uncontrollably. He then removed the gold medal from his neck and placed it around his mother's, saying "this is for Dave".

Blatnick and his teammate Steve Fraser were the first Americans to ever win gold in Olympic Greco-Roman wrestling history. Blatnick retired from wrestling after a second round with cancer, which required chemotherapy. He served as a television commentator during the 1988 Summer Olympics.

Blatnick was inducted as a Distinguished Member of the National Wrestling Hall of Fame in 1999. He served on the board of wrestlers for USA wrestling and was also a commentator for the NCAA Division I wrestling championships.

== Mixed martial arts ==
From 1994 to 2001 for UFC 4 to UFC 32, Blatnick served as a commentator for the Ultimate Fighting Championship, and was officially named as the commissioner of the UFC during UFC 17. During this time he was involved in the development of the modern rules of the sport. Bob Meyrowitz, the original owner of the UFC, tasked Blatnick to push the sport forward. With help from referee John McCarthy and then UFC matchmaker Joe Silva, Blatnick created a manual of policies, procedures, codes of conduct and rules, many of which exist to this day. He traveled around the country, educating regulators and changing perceptions about a sport that was thought to be bloodthirsty and inhumane.

By April 2000, Blatnick's efforts had clearly made an impact. California was set to become the first state in the U.S. to sign off on a set of codified rules that governed MMA. Soon after, New Jersey adopted the language. He sat cageside in Atlantic City months later, when UFC held its first event regulated under the unified rules, headlined fittingly by two outstanding wrestlers, Kevin Randleman and Blatnick's favorite fighter, Randy Couture. Blatnick's contributions to the sport of mixed martial arts helped keep the sport alive during its darkest period and helped pave the way for the sport to flourish later in the decade.

Blatnick has also been credited with giving the sport of mixed martial arts its name. Nick Lembo, the man who runs the New Jersey athletic control board, wrote, "(Jeff) would urge people to stop calling the sport No Holds Barred, in order to help it grow and gain acceptance." Dave Meltzer added, "No Holds Barred, (Blatnick) said, gave people a bad connotation of what it was, and felt it was a negative. Mixed Martial Arts, the idea of combining techniques from all the various martial arts forms with that of wrestling, was really what the sport was, he would say."

Blatnick authored the Mixed Martial Arts Council Manual and was also licensed as a referee and judge with the New Jersey commission.

A petition was also started on the MMA Underground forum by UFC fighter Shane Carwin for Blatnick to be inducted into the UFC Hall of Fame for his contributions to the organization.

On May 20, 2015, it was announced that Blatnick would be inducted into the new contributors wing of the UFC Hall of Fame for his contributions to the sport and organization. On July 11, 2015, at the UFC Hall of Fame event in Las Vegas his widow, Lori, accepted the award on Blatnick's behalf.

== Death and legacy ==
Blatnick died on October 24, 2012, as a result of complications from heart surgery. His death sent shock waves through both MMA and wrestling, and resulted in massive outpouring from fans and media in remembrance of Blatnick's life. At the time of his death, Blatnick was a varsity wrestling coach at Burnt Hills-Ballston Lake High School, and also worked as a motivational speaker. He lived with his wife Lori, son Ian, and daughter Niki in Clifton Park, New York.

Frank Shamrock called Blatnick "one of the original soldiers of MMA"; longtime UFC referee John McCarthy said, "Jeff deserves so much credit for helping establish MMA. He gave his credibility to our sport we all owe him a debt of gratitude." MMA fighter and SiriusXM radio host R. J. Clifford wrote, "Jeff Blatnick was so genuine. Seconds after becoming the first US greco medalist, he spent his interview thanking others. Most importantly, (he was) a great human being. Secondly, (he was) one of the best guys to help fix MMA judging...What a loss to both wrestling and MMA."

A municipal park in Niskayuna, New York, is named after Blatnick. Blatnick Park contains several baseball and softball fields, an 18 hole disc golf course, a pavilion and picnic area, and a small section of the Mohawk Hudson Hike/Bike Trail.
