= Kenichi Suzuki (wrestler) =

Japanese wrestler (born 1969)

Personal information
- Nationality: Japanese
- Born: 16 February 1969 (age 56); Chiba, Japan

Sport
- Sport: Wrestling

Kenichi Suzuki (鈴木 賢一, Suzuki Ken'ichi; born 16 February 1969) is a Japanese wrestler. He competed at the 1992 Summer Olympics and the 1996 Summer Olympics.
