= Deaths in April 2004 =

The following is a list of notable deaths in April 2004.

Entries for each day are listed alphabetically by surname. A typical entry lists information in the following sequence:

- Name, age, country of citizenship at birth, subsequent country of citizenship (if applicable), reason for notability, cause of death (if known), and reference.

== April 2004 ==
=== 1 ===
- Paul Atkinson, 58, British guitarist, kidney failure.
- Aaron Bank, 101, American U.S. Army officer, "Father of Special Forces".
- Vincenzo Biava, 87, Italian Olympic sports shooter (1960).
- Enrique Grau, 83, Colombian painter and sculptor.
- Yannis Kyrastas, 51, Greek football player and football manager, sepsis.
- Jim Mankins, 59, American football player (Atlanta Falcons).
- Ichirō Nakatani, 73, Japanese actor and seiyū.
- Sándor Reisenbüchler, 69, Hungarian animated film director and graphic artist.
- Mykola Rudenko, 83, Ukrainian poet and human rights activist.
- Jacques Seiler, 76, French actor and theatre director, cancer.
- Charles St Clair, 17th Lord Sinclair, 89, British aristocrat and courtier.
- Carrie Snodgress, 58, American actress (Diary of a Mad Housewife, Pale Rider, Murphy's Law), kidney failure.
- Gurcharan Singh Tohra, 79, Indian Sikh leader, heart attack.

=== 2 ===
- Ioannis Argyris, 90, Greek computer scientist.
- Alan Levy, 72, American author.
- Larry McGrew, 46, American football player (New England Patriots, New York Giants).
- Takashi Shirôzu, 86, Japanese entomologist.
- Chaïbia Talal, 75, Moroccan painter, heart attack.
- John Taras, 84, American ballet master and choreographer.

=== 3 ===
- John Diamond, Baron Diamond, 96, British life peer.
- Gabriella Ferri, 62, Italian singer, suicide.
- Eduard Linkers, 91, Austrian actor.
- Nathaniel McClinic, 77, American baseball player.
- Nagaraja Rao, 89–90, Indian cricket umpire.
- Phillip Rock, 76, American actor, screenwriter (Most Dangerous Man Alive) and novelist ("Passing Bells" trilogy).
- Tony Wallin, 46, Swedish Olympic sailor (1988).

=== 4 ===
- Gito Baloi, 39, South African musician, homicide.
- George Bamberger, 80, American baseball player and manager, cancer.
- Nikita Bogoslovsky, 90, Soviet and Russian composer, conductor, and writer.
- Danuta Czech, 82, Polish Holocaust historian.
- Sukhen Das, 65, Indian actor, director, and screenwriter of Bengali cinema.
- Gébé, 74, French cartoonist.
- Ralph Kemplen, 91, British film editor (The Day of the Jackal, The African Queen, The Dark Crystal).
- Pierre Koenig, 78, American architect and academic.
- Tevfik Lav, 44, Turkish football manager.
- Boris Levitan, 89, Russian mathematician.
- James J. Martin, 87, American historian and Holocaust denier.
- Bogdan Norčič, 50, Yugoslavian Olympic ski jumper (1976, 1980).
- Albéric Schotte, 84, Belgian road racing cyclist.
- Alwyn Williams, 82, British geologist.
- Ron Williams, 59, American basketball player (San Francisco/Golden State Warriors, Milwaukee Bucks, Los Angeles Lakers), heart attack.
- Austin Willis, 87, Canadian actor and television host.

=== 5 ===
- Isaac Carrasco, 75, Chilean football player.
- Juan Carlos Fonda, 84, Argentine footballer.
- Fernand Goyvaerts, 65, Belgian football player, cerebral hemorrhage.
- Ralph Landau, 87, American chemical engineer and entrepreneur.
- Larry McGrew, 46, American gridiron football player, heart attack.
- Pompeo Posar, 83, American Playboy magazine staff photographer.
- Sławomir Rawicz, 88, Polish army lieutenant imprisoned by the NKVD and purported escapee (The Long Walk: The True Story of a Trek to Freedom).
- Fred Winter, 77, British racehorse trainer and jockey.
- Heiner Zieschang, 67, German mathematician.

=== 6 ===
- Lou Berberet, 74, American Major League Baseball baseball player.
- Larisa Bogoraz, 74, Russian dissident and human rights activist, stroke.
- Glenn Cowan, 51, American table tennis player, heart attack.
- Anny van Doorne, 74, Dutch Olympic equestrian (1972).
- Ken Johnson, 81, American baseball player (St. Louis Cardinals, Philadelphia Phillies, Detroit Tigers).
- Alexander Lerner, 90, Soviet and Ukrainian scientist and refusenik.
- Niki Sullivan, 66, American Rock and Roll guitarist, heart attack.
- Ingemar Svensson, 75, Swedish Olympic rower (1952).

=== 7 ===
- Victor Argo, 69, American actor (King of New York, Taxi Driver, Bad Lieutenant), complications from lung cancer.
- Wolfgang Mattheuer, 77, German painter, graphic artist and sculptor, heart failure.
- Marian McCargo, 72, American actress and champion tennis player, pancreatic cancer.
- Kelucharan Mohapatra, 77, Indian classical dancer and guru.
- Jeff Newman, 62, American country musician, plane crash.
- Maureen Potter, 79, Irish actress, singer, dancer and comedian.
- Robert Sangster, 67, British racehorse owner, pancreatic cancer.
- Peter Urban, 69, American martial artist.

=== 8 ===
- Shafic Abboud, 77, Lebanese painter.
- Herb Andress, 69, Austrian film and television actor, bladder cancer.
- Adrian Beers, 88, British double bass player.
- Chief Bey, 90, American jazz percussionist and African folklorist, stomach cancer.
- Enda Colleran, 61, Irish Gaelic football player and manager.
- Ruth Tabrah, 83, American writer and ordained Buddhist minister.
- Joe Tierney, 101, American Olympic sprinter (1928).

=== 9 ===
- Lélia Abramo, 93, Brazilian actress and political activist, and politician, pulmonary embolism.
- Harry Babbitt, 90, American singer.
- Jiří Čtyřoký, 93, Czech Olympic basketball player (1936).
- Chick Meehan, 87, American basketball player (Syracuse Nationals).
- Donna Michelle, 58, American model, actress, and photographer, heart attack.
- Chance Phelps, 19, American private first class.
- Billy Richardson, 83, Irish soccer player and Olympian (1948).
- Julius Sang, 55, Kenyan Olympic runner (1968, 1972).
- Jiří Weiss, 91, Czech film director, screenwriter, writer, and playwright.

=== 10 ===
- Roger Achten, 76, Belgian Olympic fencer (1956, 1960).
- Paul-Louis Boutié, 93, French art director.
- Bertil Göransson, 85, Swedish rowing coxswain and Olympic silver medalist (1956).
- Maurice Jacquel, 75, French Olympic wrestler (1960).
- Jacek Kaczmarski, 47, Polish poet and singer, the bard of Solidarity, laryngeal cancer.
- Ben Pimlott, 58, British historian, leukemia.
- Roland Rainer, 93, Austrian architect.
- Sakıp Sabancı, 71, Turkish businessman, kidney cancer.
- Odd Wang Sørensen, 81, Norwegian Olympic football player (1952).

=== 11 ===
- Atanas Aleksandrov, 51, Bulgarian footballer.
- Stan Darling, 92, Canadian politician, member of the House of Commons of Canada (1972-1993).
- Sammy Fox, 85, American football player (New York Giants).
- Hy Gotkin, 81, American basketball player.
- Paul Hamburger, 83, British pianist, accompanist, chamber musician, and scholar.
- Mamadou Aliou Kéïta, 52, Guinean football player, cardiac arrest.

=== 12 ===
- İrfan Atan, 75-76, Turkish Olympic wrestler (1952).
- Ted Bromley, 91, Australian rower and Olympian (1948).
- Norman Campbell, 80, Canadian composer, television producer and director, stroke.
- Alejandro Díaz, 83, Chilean hammer thrower and Olympian (1956).
- Robert Richardson, 76, Canadian Olympic alpine skier (1952).
- Frank Seward, 83, American baseball player (New York Giants).
- Juanito Valderrama, 87, Spanish folk and flamenco singer.
- Wesley Wehr, 74, American paleontologist and artist.
- George W. Whitehead, 85, American mathematician.

=== 13 ===
- Roland Clauws, 70, French footballer.
- Ritchie Cordell, 61, American songwriter, singer and record producer, pancreatic cancer.
- Dadamaino, 73, Italian visual artist and painter.
- Hilda Fenemore, 89, English actress.
- Tito Figueroa, 89, Puerto Rican baseball player.
- David Fowler, 66, British mathematician.
- Csaba Horváth, 74, Hungarian-American chemical engineer and scientist.
- Caron Keating, 41, British television presenter, breast cancer.
- Aarne Saarinen, 90, Finnish politician and a trade union leader.
- Filemon Vela Sr., 68, American district judge (United States District Court for the Southern District of Texas).

=== 14 ===
- Micheline Charest, 51, British television producer, complications following plastic surgery.
- Antonio Cobas, 52, Spanish Grand Prix motorcycle designer and mechanic, cancer.
- Albie Grant, 60, American college basketball player (LIU Brooklyn Blackbirds).
- Erik Kuld Jensen, 78, Danish football player and Olympian (1948).
- Robin Popplestone, 65, British software designer and a pioneer in artificial intelligence and robotics, prostate cancer.
- Fabrizio Quattrocchi, 35, Italian security officer, killed by Islamist militants in Iraq.
- Osvaldo Riva, 76, Italian Olympic wrestler (1952).

=== 15 ===
- Ray Condo, 53, Canadian rockabilly singer, saxophonist, and guitarist, heart attack.
- María Denis, 87, Argentine-Italian film actress.
- Phyllis Dillon, 59, Jamaican rocksteady and reggae singer, cancer.
- Hans Gmür, 77, Swiss theatre director, composer and producer.
- Jack Miller, 78, Canadian ice hockey player (Chicago Black Hawks).
- Maury Schleicher, 66, American football player (Chicago Cardinals, Los Angeles/San Diego Chargers).
- Mitsuteru Yokoyama, 69, Japanese manga artist, accidental death.

=== 16 ===
- Abu al-Walid, Saudi Arabian terrorist, killed by Russian federal forces.
- Carlos Castaño, 38, Colombian rebel leader, killed by FARC guerillas.
- Elwood Cooke, 90, American tennis player.
- Nour El-Dali, 75, Egyptian footballer and Olympian (1952).
- Wilmot N. Hess, 77, American physicist, leukemia.
- Harry Mayerovitch, 94, Canadian architect, artist, illustrator, and author.
- Matilde Moraschi, 94, Italian basketball player and Olympian sprinter (1928).
- Jan Szczepański, 90, Polish sociologist and politician.
- James Walraven, 54, American murderer and suspected serial killer, suicide.
- Noriaki Yasuda, 68, Japanese pole vaulter and Olympian (1960).

=== 17 ===
- Charlie Armitt, 78, English rugby league footballer.
- Abdel Aziz al-Rantisi, 56, Palestinian Hamas leader, targeted killing by Israel.
- Bruce Boa, 73, Canadian-British actor (The Empire Strikes Back, Octopussy, Full Metal Jacket), cancer.
- Hoo Cha-pen, 79-80, Taiwanese Olympic basketball player (1956).
- Anke Hartnagel, 62, German politician, Member of the German Bundestag (1998–2004).
- Geraint Howells, 79, Welsh politician.
- Joe Kennedy Jr., 80, American jazz violinist.
- Jim Ligon, 60, American basketball player (Kentucky Colonels, Pittsburgh Condors, Virginia Squires).
- Earl Miner, 77, American professor at Princeton University.
- Soundarya, 31, Indian film actress, plane crash.
- Bobby Wawak, 64, American NASCAR race driver.

=== 18 ===
- David Clarke, 95, American Broadway and motion picture actor.
- Tzila Dagan, 57, Israeli singer-songwriter, cancer.
- Gürdal Duyar, 68, Turkish sculptor.
- Brice Hunter, 29, American gridiron football player (Georgia Bulldogs, Tampa Bay Buccaneers), shot.
- Kamisese Mara, 83, Fijian politician, prime minister and president, stroke.
- Koken Nosaka, 79, Japanese politician.
- Frances Rafferty, 81, American actress, dancer, and model.
- Werner Schumacher, 82, German actor.

=== 19 ===
- Gene Edward Brooks, 72, American district judge (United States District Court for the Southern District of Indiana).
- Tim Burstall, 76, Australian film director and producer, stroke.
- Jim Cantalupo, 60, American businessman, CEO of McDonald's, heart attack.
- George Hardwick, 84, English football player, manager and coach.
- Volodymyr Kaplychnyi, 60, Ukrainian football player and Olympian (1972).
- Julião da Kutonda, 39, Angolan footballer.
- Philip Locke, 76, British actor.
- José Luis Martínez, 60, Argentine Olympic hammer thrower (1968).
- Norris McWhirter, 78, British writer, political activist and founder of the Guinness Book of Records, heart attack.
- Frank B. Morrison, 98, American politician, Governor of Nebraska.
- Sam Nahem, 88, American baseball player (Brooklyn Dodgers, St. Louis Cardinals, Philadelphia Phillies).
- Yasumasa Nishino, 79, Japanese Olympic swimmer (1952).
- Ronnie Simpson, 73, Scottish footballer, manager and Olympian (1948), heart attack.
- John Maynard Smith, 84, British biologist, lung cancer.
- Wolfgang Unger, 55, German conductor, cancer.

=== 20 ===
- Lizzy Mercier Descloux, 47, French musician, actress, writer and painter, cancer.
- Komal Kothari, 75, Indian folklorist and ethnomusicologist.
- Claude Leroy, 68, French Olympic field hockey player (1960).
- Mary McGrory, 85, American journalist and columnist.
- Abdullah Shah, 59, Afghan serial killer, executed.
- Al Stiller, 80, American Olympic cyclist (1948).

=== 21 ===
- Eduard Asadov, 80, Russian poet and writer.
- Rıza Doğan, 73, Turkish wrestler and Olympic silver medalist (1956).
- Den Fujita, 78, Japanese founder of McDonald's Japan, heart failure.
- Karl Hass, 91, German SS officer and convicted war criminal.
- John W. Kirklin, 87, American cardiothoracic surgeon who refined John Gibbon's heart–lung bypass machine.
- Kaj Schmidt, 78, Danish Olympic canoeist (1960).
- Mary Selway, 68, British casting director (Raiders of the Lost Ark, Return of the Jedi, Gosford Park), cancer.
- Tui St. George Tucker, 79, American modernist composer and conductors.
- Sunčana Škrinjarić, 72, Croatian writer, poet and journalist.

=== 22 ===
- Saleem Akhtar, 73, Pakistani cricket player.
- Paul Benson, 85, American district judge (United States District Court for the District of North Dakota).
- Franco Delli Colli, 75, Italian film cinematographer, pulmonary embolism.
- Art Devlin, 81, American ski jumper and Olympian (1952, 1956), brain cancer.
- Jason Dunham, 22, American marine, used his body to shield others from a grenade explosion, killed in action.
- Sami Hadawi, 100, Palestinian scholar and author.
- Pat Tillman, 27, American gridiron football player (Arizona Cardinals) and Army Ranger, killed in action by friendly fire.

=== 23 ===
- Manuel Alcalde, 47, Spanish race walker and Olympian (1984, 1988).
- Marie-Émile Boismard, 87, French biblical scholar.
- Klaus Lampi, 75, Finnish Olympic rower (1952).
- Saúl Ongaro, 87, Argentine football player.
- Peter S. Prescott, 68, American author and book critic, liver disease.
- Ross Rutledge, 41, Canadian field hockey player and Olympian (1984, 1988), cancer.
- B. V. Satyanarayan, 68, Indian Olympic long jumper (1960, 1964).
- Herman Veenstra, 92, Dutch Olympic water polo player (1936).

=== 24 ===
- Nathan Bruckenthal, 24, United States coast guardsman, killed in action.
- Betty Clay, 87, British scouter, daughter of Robert Baden-Powell.
- José Giovanni, 80, French writer and film maker, cerebral hemorrhage.
- Feridun Karakaya, 76, Turkish actor, heart attack.
- Lia Laats, 78, Estonian stage and film actress.
- Estée Lauder, 97, American businesswoman, cosmetics products pioneer, heart attack.
- Willie Watson, 84, English cricketer.
- Des Warren, 66, British trade unionist.

=== 25 ===
- Alphonzo E. Bell, Jr., 89, American politician, member of the United States House of Representatives (1961-1977), pneumonia.
- Dooland Buultjens, 70, Sri Lankan cricket umpire.
- Thom Gunn, 74, British poet.
- Eddie Hopkinson, 68, English football goalkeeper.
- Shota Kveliashvili, 66, Georgian sports shooter and Olympic silver medalist (1964, 1968).
- Kenjiro Matsuda, 68, Japanese Olympic sailor (1964).
- Carl Melles, 77, Austrian orchestral conductor.
- Hiroshi Mitsuzuka, 76, Japanese politician.
- Albert Paulsen, 78, Ecuadorian-American actor.
- Jacques Rouxel, 73, French film animator.
- Sid Watson, 71, American football player and ice hockey coach, heart attack.
- Claude Williams, 96, American jazz musician.

=== 26 ===
- Kurt Dossin, 91, German field handball player and Olympic champion (1936).
- Rangel Gerovski, 45, Bulgarian wrestler and Olympic silver medalist (1988, 1992).
- Paul Hasule, 44, Ugandan football player.
- Robert Clark Jones, 87, American physicist.
- Lee Loevinger, 91, American jurist and lawyer, complications of heart disease.
- Gunther E. Rothenberg, 80, German-American historian.
- Hubert Selby Jr., 75, American writer (Last Exit to Brooklyn, Requiem for a Dream), pulmonary embolism.
- Hasse Thomsén, 62, Swedish heavyweight boxer and Olympic medalist (1972).

=== 27 ===
- Gleason Archer, 87, American theologian.
- David Jenkinson, 69, British railway modeller and historian.
- John C. Ostlund, 76, American politician.
- Alex Randolph, 81, American designer of board games (TwixT, Enchanted Forest, Inkognito, Ricochet Robot).
- Buford John Schramm, 65, American businessman and aviator, founder of RotorWay, helicopter crash.
- Alejandro Ulloa, 93, Spanish actor.
- Roy Walford, 79, American dietician and author.
- Lloyd F. Wheat, 81, American lawyer and politician.

=== 28 ===
- Patrick Berhault, 46, French rock climber and mountaineer, climbing accident.
- Jeremy Black, 52, British assyriologist.
- Jean Devaivre, 91, French film director and screenwriter.
- Elizabeth Fisher, 93, Canadian Olympic figure skater (1932).
- Floyd Giebell, 94, American baseball player (Detroit Tigers).
- Kifle Wodajo, 67, Ethiopian politician and diplomat.

=== 29 ===
- Gaetano Badalamenti, 80, Italian member of the Sicilian Mafia, heart attack.
- Alexander Bovin, 73, Soviet and Russian journalist, political scientist and diplomat.
- Alberto Braga, 75, Brazilian Olympic sports shooter (1952).
- Svend Helge Hansen, 73, Danish Olympic rower (1960).
- John Henniker-Major, 8th Baron Henniker, 88, British diplomat and aristocrat.
- Nick Joaquin, 86, Filipino writer and national artist.
- David S. Sheridan, 95, American inventor of disposable plastic endotracheal tube.
- Sid Smith, 78, Canadian ice hockey player (Toronto Maple Leafs).
- Svend Aage Holm Sørensen, 91, Danish Olympic rower (1936).
- Stig Synnergren, 89, Swedish Army officer.

=== 30 ===
- Heather Brigstocke, Baroness Brigstocke, 74, British educator and life peer.
- Jeff Butterfield, 74, English rugby player.
- Joseph Cullman, 92, American businessman, CEO of Philip Morris Company.
- Kioumars Saberi Foumani, (aka Gol-Agha), 62, Iranian satirist, cancer.
- Jeffrey Alan Gray, 69, British psychiatrist, prostate cancer.
- Frederick Karl, 77, American literary biographer.
- Georges Lagrange, 75, French esperantist writer.
- Åke Lindemalm, 94, Swedish Navy officer.
- Evelyn Mase, 81, South African nurse, first wife of Nelson Mandela.
- Boris Piergamienszczikow, 55, Russian cellist.
- Kazimierz Plater, 89, Polish chess International Master, three-time Polish chess champion (1949, 1956, 1957).
- Adolph Verschueren, 81, Belgian road cyclist.
