= Deaths in August 2004 =

The following is a list of notable deaths in August 2004.

Entries for each day are listed alphabetically by surname. A typical entry lists information in the following sequence:

- Name, age, country of citizenship at birth, subsequent country of citizenship (if applicable), reason for notability, cause of death (if known), and reference.

== August 2004 ==
=== 1 ===
- Philip Abelson, 91, American physicist, co-discoverer of Neptunium, respiratory failure.
- Vivian Austin, 84, American actress.
- John Higgins, 88, American Olympic swimmer (1936), and coach, pneumonia.
- George F. Kugler, Jr., 79, American lawyer.
- Sidney Morgenbesser, 82, American philosopher.
- Joe Prater, 81, American baseball player and football coach.
- Madeleine Robinson, 86, French actress.
- Ken Timbs, 53, American professional wrestler, cardiomyopathy and congestive heart failure.

=== 2 ===
- V. Balakrishnan, 72, Indian Malayalam writer and translator.
- François Craenhals, 77, Belgian comics artist.
- V. Lamar Gudger, 85, American judge and politician, member of the United States House of Representatives (1977-1981).
- Heinrich Mark, 92, Estonian politician, Prime Minister-in-exile (1971-1990).
- José Omar Pastoriza, 62, Argentinian football player and coach, cardiovascular disease.
- Mike Schultz, 83, American baseball player (Cincinnati Reds).
- Arturo M. Tolentino, 93, Philippine lawyer and politician, heart attack.
- Don Tosti, 81, American musician and composer.

=== 3 ===
- Antonio Amorós, 77, Spanish athlete.
- Henri Cartier-Bresson, 95, French photographer.
- Gloria Emerson, 75, American author, journalist and New York Times war correspondent, suicide.
- Bob Murphy, 79, American Major League Baseball sportscaster, lung cancer.
- Bryon Nickoloff, 48, Canadian chess International Master, stomach cancer.
- Geraldine Peroni, 51, American film editor (The Player, Dr. T and the Women, Michael), suicide.

=== 4 ===
- Pierre de Chevigné, 95, French politician.
- Jeanne Gilchrist, 78, Canadian baseball player.
- Robert Yewdall Jennings, 90, British jurist, President of the International Court of Justice.
- Eivor Landström, 85, Swedish actress.
- Joan Matuzewski, 71, American baseball player.
- Frank Maxwell, 87, American actor.
- Mary Sherman Morgan, 82, American rocket scientist.
- Hossein Panahi, 47, Iranian actor and poet, heart attack.
- Fumio Watanabe, 74, Japanese actor.

=== 5 ===
- Uri Adelman, 45, Israeli writer, musician, computer expert, and academic, heart attack.
- Stan Dargis, 76, Lithuanian-born Australian Olympic basketball player (1956).
- Don Grossman, 83, Australian rules footballer.
- Edith Jiménez, 86, Paraguayan plastic artist.
- André Wogenscky, 88, French modernist architect and member of the Académie des Beaux-Arts.

=== 6 ===
- Ennio Antonelli, 77, Italian actor and boxer.
- Mauro Cabeção, 49, Brazilian Olympic footballer (1976).
- Joseph-Marie Lo Duca, 98, Italian-French journalist, novelist, art critic, and film historian.
- Rick James, 56, American singer ("Mary Jane", "Give It to Me Baby", "Super Freak") and producer, heart attack.
- Philip G. Johnson, 78, American Hall of Fame trainer of Thoroughbred race horses.
- Donald Justice, 78, American poet.
- Murray S. Klamkin, 83, American mathematician.
- Christopher Matthews, British businessman, helicopter crash.

=== 7 ===
- Red Adair, 89, American oil well fire-fighter.
- María Esperanza de Bianchini, 75, Venezuelan mystic.
- G.T. Hogan, 75, American jazz drummer.
- Bernard Levin, 75, English journalist and broadcaster, Alzheimer's disease.
- Ismael Rodríguez, 86, Mexican film director, screenwriter, respiratory failure.
- Jukka Sipilä, 68, Finnish actor and television director.
- Gordon Smith, 80, Scottish footballer.
- Chris Wallace, 70, Australian computer scientist and physicist.

=== 8 ===
- Henrique Abranches, 71, Angolan writer and anthropologist, stroke.
- Gypsy Boots, 89, American health and fitness pioneer.
- Pete Center, 92, American baseball player (Cleveland Indians).
- Gordon Davidson, 86, Canadian ice hockey player (New York Rangers).
- Eva Frommer, 76, German-British consultant child psychiatrist.
- Rudolf Galin, 76, Croatian Olympic hammer thrower (1952).
- Paul Garner, 95, American comedian, Three Stooges associate.
- Leon Golub, 82, American artist and painter.
- Leroy King, 82, American basketball player (Rochester Royals).
- Dimitris Papamichael, 70, Greek actor, heart attack.
- Jean Pouliot, 81, Canadian broadcasting pioneer.
- S. V. Ramadoss, 83, Indian actor.
- Fay Wray, 96, Canadian-American actress (King Kong).

=== 9 ===
- Liisi Beckmann, 79, Finnish designer and artist.
- John Chaney, 84, American basketball player (Syracuse Nationals, Tri-Cities Blackhawks, Sheboygan Red Skins).
- Harry Cullum, 74, British Olympic sports shooter (1964, 1972).
- Sam Hogin, 54, American country music songwriter.
- Robert Lecourt, 95, French politician, judge and president of the European Court of Justice.
- Tony Mottola, 86, American guitarist who played with Frank Sinatra and on The Tonight Show orchestra, stroke.
- Eduard Neumann, 93, German Luftwaffe officer during WWII.
- David Raksin, 92, American composer of film and television scores (Laura).
- Saul Rosenzweig, 97, American psychologist and therapist.
- René Taton, 89, French author and historian of science.

=== 10 ===
- Walter Bielser, 75, Swiss footballer.
- K. P. Brahmanandan, 58, Indian playback singer from Kerala.
- Alan N. Cohen, 73, American basketball executive and owner of the Boston Celtics.
- James Stillman Rockefeller, 102, American member of the Rockefeller family and Olympic champion (1924), stroke.

=== 11 ===
- Sir David Calcutt, 73, British barrister and public servant.
- Joe Falls, 76, American journalist, longtime sports writer for The Detroit News, heart attack.
- Viktor Karachun, 35, Belarusian ice hockey player and Olympian (1998).
- Bill Martin Jr., 88, American author of Chicka Chicka Boom Boom.
- Wolfgang Mommsen, 73, German historian.

=== 12 ===
- Bjarne Andersson, 64, Swedish cross-country skier, Olympic silver medalist (1968).
- Humayun Azad, 57, Bangladeshi poet, writer, critic, linguist, and academic.
- Godfrey Hounsfield, 84, British electrical engineer and Nobel Prize in Medicine laureate, co-inventor of the CAT scan.
- Larry Mason, 69, Canadian Olympic speed skater (1960).
- John McGuigan, 71, Scottish football player.
- Sebastián Ontoria, 84, Spanish footballer.
- Perica Vlašić, 72, Croatian Olympic rower (1956, 1960).
- Basil Wigoder, 83, British politician and barrister.
- George Yardley, 75, American NBA basketball player (Fort Wayne/Detroit Pistons, Syracuse Nationals), ALS.

=== 13 ===
- Mabel Addis, 92, American writer, teacher and the first video game writer.
- Gerrit Bijlsma, 74, Dutch water polo player and Olympian (1952).
- Julia Child, 91, American chef, author and television hostess on French cuisine, kidney failure.
- Sei Ikeno, 73, Japanese composer.
- Josef Paul Kleihues, 71, German architect.
- Bent Krog, 69, Danish footballer and Olympian (1960).
- Donald Meltzer, 81, American Kleinian psychoanalyst.
- Milton Pollack, 97, American federal judge who ruled on court cases involving Wall Street.
- Peter Woodthorpe, 72, British character actor.
- Akku Yadav, 32, Indian gangster and criminal, lynched.
- Ko Yong-hui, 52, North Korean mistress of supreme leader Kim Jong Il and mother of Kim Jong Un, breast cancer.

=== 14 ===
- David Brown, 76, American rower and Olympic champion (1948).
- Dhananjoy Chatterjee, 39, Indian rapist and murderer, executed.
- Charles Denroche, 82, Irish Olympic sprinter (1948).
- William David Ford, 77, American politician, member of the United States House of Representatives (1965-1995), stroke.
- Neal Fredericks, 35, American cinematographer (The Blair Witch Project), drowned.
- Robert Howard, 28, American athletic jumper and Olympian (1996, 2000).
- Czesław Miłosz, 93, Polish poet, Nobel Prize in Literature in 1980, and dissident.
- Bomber Moran, 59, Filipino actor, prostate cancer.
- Eric Petrie, 77, New Zealand cricketer.
- Stephen M. Reasoner, 60, American district judge (United States District Court for the Eastern District of Arkansas).
- Trevor Skeet, 86, New Zealand-British lawyer and politician.

=== 15 ===
- Sune Bergström, 88, Swedish biochemist, Nobel Prize in Medicine.
- Semiha Berksoy, 94, Turkish opera singer.
- Amarsinh Chaudhary, 63, Indian politician, heart attack.
- Charles Eaton, 94, American juvenile stage and film performer.
- Armando Lambruschini, 80, Argentine navy admiral.
- Kirk McCarthy, 37, Australian motorcycle road racer, racing accident.
- Paul Ngei, 80, Kenyan politician, diabetes.
- Atefah Sahaaleh, 16, Iranian teenage girl and regime victim, execution by hanging.
- Min Thu Wun, 95, Burmese poet, writer and scholar.

=== 16 ===
- Acquanetta, 83, American B-movie actress, Alzheimer's disease.
- Babken Arakelyan, 92, Armenian historian and archeologist.
- André Binette, 70, Canadian ice hockey player (Montreal Canadiens).
- Ivan Hlinka, 54, Czech national hockey team, Pittsburgh Penguins coach, and Olympian (1972, 1976), traffic collision.
- Jikki, 68, Indian playback singer from Andhra Pradesh.
- J. Irwin Miller, 95, American businessman, philanthropist, and civil rights advocate.
- Carl Mydans, 97, American photographer.
- Robert Quiroga, 35, American world champion boxer, murdered.

=== 17 ===
- Thea Astley, 78, Australian novelist.
- Frank Cotroni, 73, Italian-Canadian mobster and boss of the Cotroni crime family, brain cancer.
- Marosa di Giorgio, 72, Uruguayan poet and novelist.
- Tom Holt, 80, British Olympic swimmer (1948).
- Shizuo Kakutani, 92, Japanese-American mathematician.
- Luz Magsaysay, 90, 7th First Lady of the Philippines.
- Jack Marshall, 84, Canadian politician.
- Clyde Roberts, 95, American college football player.
- Gérard Souzay, 85, French baritone.
- Kain Tapper, 74, Finnish sculptor.
- Armando Dely Valdés, 40, Panamanian football player, heart attack.

=== 18 ===
- Susan Mary Alsop, 84, American socialite, hostess and writer.
- Elmer Bernstein, 82, American film composer (Thoroughly Modern Millie, Ghostbusters, To Kill a Mockingbird), Oscar winner (1968), cancer.
- Clyde S. Cahill Jr., 81, American district judge (United States District Court for the Eastern District of Missouri).
- Jean Campbell, 76, American baseball player.
- Joe Dodge, 82, American jazz musician.
- Hiram Fong, 97, American businessman and politician, first Asian American elected to the U.S. Senate, kidney failure.
- Gylfi Þorsteinsson Gíslason, 87, Icelandic politician.
- Anicet Kashamura, 75, Congolese politician.
- Helen Niña Tappan Loeblich, 86, American micropaleontologist.
- Hugh Manning, 83, British actor (Emmerdale, The Elephant Man, Mrs Thursday).
- Víctor Cervera Pacheco, 68, Mexican politician, former Governor of Yucatán, heart attack.
- Uday Prakash, 40, Indian actor, alcoholism.
- Ray Reutt, 87, American football player (Steagles).
- Charlie Waller, 69, American bluegrass musician, founder of the band Country Gentlemen.

=== 19 ===
- Tom Baldwin, 57, American race driver, racing accident.
- George Gibson, 98, American football player (Minneapolis Red Jackets, Frankford Yellow Jackets), and coach.
- Henry Hammond, 91, American football player (Chicago Bears).
- Edmund Kurtz, 95, Russian-American cellist.
- Kyi Maung, 83, Myanmar Army officer and politician.
- Hiroshi Nosaka, 89, Japanese Olympic gymnast (1936).

=== 20 ===
- Arthur Lever, 84, Welsh professional footballer.
- Willie Patterson, 85, American baseball player.
- María Antonieta Pons, 82, Cuban-born Mexican actress in rumbera films.
- Moshe Shamir, 83, Israeli politician, playwright and columnist.
- Leslie Shepard, 87, British author, archivist, and curator.

=== 21 ===
- Viktor Avilov, 51, Soviet and Russian film and theater actor, cancer.
- Isaäc Arend Diepenhorst, 88, Dutch politician and jurist.
- Maddy English, 79, American baseball player (AAGPBL).
- Bill Hobbs, 57, American gridiron football player (Philadelphia Eagles, New Orleans Saints), accidental death.
- Finn Mittet, 81, Danish footballer.
- Hortensia Blanch Pita, 89, Spanish writer.
- William Powell, 85, American baseball player.
- Sachidananda Routray, 88, Indian poet and novelist.

=== 22 ===
- Konstantin Aseev, 43, Russian chess Grandmaster and coach, leukemia.
- Angus Bethune, 95, Australian politician and member of the Tasmanian House of Assembly.
- Louella Daetweiler, 86, American baseball player.
- Haralambie Ivanov, 63, Romanian sprint canoeist and Olympic silver medalist (1964, 1968).
- George Kirgo, 78, American television and film writer, president of the Writers Guild of America, kidney failure.
- Jim Nelson, 57, American baseball player (Pittsburgh Pirates).
- Daniel Petrie, 83, Canadian film director (A Raisin in the Sun, Cocoon: The Return, The Bay Boy), cancer.
- Reginaldo Polloni, 87–88, Italian Olympic rower (1948).
- Ota Šik, 84, Czech economist and politician, architect of economic liberalization during the 1968 Prague Spring.
- Eddison Zvobgo, 68, Zimbabwean politician and the founder of ruling party, ZANU–PF, cancer.

=== 23 ===
- Yerik Assanbayev, 68, Kazakh statesman and vice-president (1991-1996).
- Hank Borowy, 88, American baseball player.
- Francesco Minerva, 100, Italian Roman Catholic archbishop.
- Anthony Rhodes, 87, British writer and scholar.
- Víctor Urquidi, 85, Mexican civil servant, economist, and academic.

=== 24 ===
- Richard Ervin, 99, American attorney general and chief justice of Florida.
- Nate Johnson, 84, American football player (New York Yankees, Chicago Rockets/Hornets, New York Yanks).
- Elisabeth Kübler-Ross, 78, Swiss-American psychiatrist.
- Bob Price, 76, American politician (U.S. Representative for Texas districts).
- Ivy Rahman, 60, Bangladeshi politician, grenade attack.
- Eduardo Ramírez Villamizar, 81, Colombian painter and sculptor.

=== 25 ===
- Donald M. Ashton, 85, British film art director and production designer, Parkinson's disease.
- John Barnes, 74, American middle-distance runner and Olympian (1952).
- Karen Dior, 37, American actress, singer, director, and drag queen, viral hepatitis.
- Hal Epps, 90, American baseball player (St. Louis Cardinals, St. Louis Browns, Philadelphia Athletics).
- Marcelo González Martín, 86, Spanish Roman Catholic cardinal and archbishop of Toledo (1971-1995).
- Carl Szokoll, 88, Austrian resistance fighter during World War II, and after the war author and film producer.
- David Woodward, 61, English-American historian of cartography and cartographer, cancer.

=== 26 ===
- Enzo Baldoni, 56, Italian journalist, murdered in Iraq.
- Laura Branigan, 52, American pop singer ("Gloria", "Self Control"), cerebral aneurysm.
- Lewis Carter-Jones, 83, British politician.
- Fred Ohlhorn, 46, German judoka.
- Rajanand, 76, Indian actor in the Kannada film industry.
- Lyn Thomas, 74, American stage, television and film actress.
- Tite, 74, Brazilian footballer.
- Matthias Volz, 94, German Olympic gymnast (1936).

=== 27 ===
- Fernand Auberjonois, 93, Swiss foreign news correspondent for the Pittsburgh Post-Gazette and Toledo Blade.
- Willie Crawford, 57, American baseball player (Los Angeles Dodgers), kidney disease.
- Gottlieb Göller, 69, German football player and manager.
- Suzanne Kaaren, 92, American actress (Three Stooges films).
- William Kendall, 88, Australian Olympic swimmer (1936).
- Larry McCormick, 71, American television personality, cancer.
- Susan Peretz, 64, American actress (Dog Day Afternoon, Melvin and Howard, Swing Shift), breast cancer.
- William Pierson, 78, American actor (Stalag 17, Three's Company, Corvette Summer), respiratory failure.
- Chay Weng Yew, 76, Singaporean weightlifter and Olympian (1952).

=== 28 ===
- Isidoro Blaisten, 71, Argentine writer.
- Jerzy Dzięcioł, 92, Polish Olympic sailor (1936).
- Silvana Jachino, 88, Italian actress.
- Robert Lewin, 84, American producer and screenwriter, lung cancer.
- Mercedes Vecino, 88, Spanish film actress.

=== 29 ===
- Donald Allen, 92, American editor, publisher and translator of American literature.
- Valentino Borgia, 89, Italian Olympic wrestler (1936).
- Ivan Lacković Croata, 72, Croatian naive painter, heart attack.
- Nikolai Getman, 86, Soviet/Ukrainian artist and Gulag detainee
- Helen Lane, 83, American translator.
- Leonardus Benjamin Moerdani, 71, Indonesian general and politician, stroke and lung infection.
- René Ménil, 97, French surrealist writer and philosopher.
- Antoine Schnapper, 71, French art historian.
- Koju Tsukamoto, 62, Japanese Olympic rower (1964).
- Vladimir Velebit, 97, Yugoslav politician, diplomat and military leader.
- Hans Vonk, 62, Dutch conductor, ALS.

=== 30 ===
- Dely Atay-Atayan, 90, Filipina comedian and singer.
- Robert Boyer, 56, Canadian visual artist, powwow dancer and university professor of aboriginal heritage.
- Willie Duff, 69, Scottish football goalkeeper (Heart of Midlothian, Charlton Athletic, Peterborough United and Dunfermline Athletic).
- Frank Horton, 84, American politician, member of the United States House of Representatives (1963-1993).
- Bart Huges, 70, Dutch librarian and proponent of trepanation.
- Derek Johnson, 71, British athlete, athletics administrator, and Olympian (1956), leukemia.
- E. Fay Jones, 83, American architect and designer, trained by Frank Lloyd Wright.
- Indian Larry, 55, American motorcycle builder, artist, and stunt rider stunt, injuries suffered during a stunt.
- Mario Levrero, 64, Uruguayan author.
- Bob Sherman, 63, American actor.
- Fred Lawrence Whipple, 97, American astronomer.

=== 31 ===
- Edvin Landsem, 79, Norwegian Olympic cross-country skier (1952, 1956).
- Tamaz Nadareishvili, 50, Georgian politician, heart attack.
- Lex Peterson, 46, New Zealand Olympic bobsledder (1988).
- Carl Wayne, 61, English lead singer of pop group The Move, cancer.
