= 2004 in film =

2004 in film is an overview of events, including the highest-grossing films, award ceremonies, festivals, a list of country-specific lists of films released, notable deaths and film debuts. Shrek 2 was the year's top-grossing film, and Million Dollar Baby won the Academy Award for Best Picture.

== Evaluation of the year ==
American film critic and professor Emanuel Levy described 2004 as "a banner year for actors, particularly men." He went on to emphasize, "I can't think of another year in which there were so many good performances, in every genre. It was a year in which we saw the entire spectrum of demographics displayed on the big screen, from vet actors such as Clint Eastwood and Morgan Freeman, to seniors such as Al Pacino, Robert De Niro, and Dustin Hoffman, to newcomers such as Topher Grace. As always, though, the centre of the male acting pyramid is occupied by actors in their forties and fifties, such as Sean Penn, Johnny Depp, Liam Neeson, Kevin Kline, Don Cheadle, Jim Carrey. In terms of film genres, Levy stated, "The year's most prominent genre was the biopicture, a genre that in the past has suffered from lack of prestige and abundance of clichés. There were a dozen worthy biopictures, including Alexander, The Aviator, Beyond the Sea, Finding Neverland, Hotel Rwanda, Kinsey, Motorcycle Diaries, and Ray. Celebrating entrepreneurs, playwrights, singers, sex researchers, composers, and politicians, they continued to show one alarming bias: They were all about men. You don't have to be a feminist critic or a sociologist to deduct that, as far as real or reel heroes are concerned, women matter less in Hollywood and American society at large. Can't anyone come up with a strong part for a femme-driven bio a la British film Vera Drake, without relegating women to showbiz personae." Levy also stated, "Classic Hollywood cinema, which reached its height during the golden age of studio system and has been in decline, is kept alive by one major force: Clint Eastwood. The "Man With No Name" has become the "Man With the Best Name", a director who's experiencing an unparallel artistic height with “Million Dollar Baby,” a follow-up to the equally sublime Mystic River."

== Highest-grossing films ==
The top 10 films released in 2004 by worldwide gross are as follows:

Highest-grossing films of 2004
Rank	Title	Distributor	Worldwide gross
1	Shrek 2	DreamWorks	$929,098,316 (Note: Excluding grosses from subsequent re-releases.)
2	Harry Potter and the Prisoner of Azkaban	Warner Bros.	$795,634,069
3	Spider-Man 2	Sony	$783,766,341
4	The Incredibles	Buena Vista	$631,442,092
5	The Passion of the Christ	Icon / Newmarket	$611,486,736
6	The Day After Tomorrow	20th Century Fox / Lionsgate	$552,639,571
7	Meet the Fockers	Universal / DreamWorks	$522,657,936
8	Troy	Warner Bros.	$497,409,852
9	Shark Tale	DreamWorks	$374,583,879
10	Ocean's Twelve	Warner Bros.	$362,744,280

Shrek 2 set a new record for total gross by an animated film making it the highest-grossing animated film of all time. The record was later surpassed by Toy Story 3 in 2010. It also remained the highest-grossing non-Disney animated film until it was surpassed by Despicable Me 2 in 2013 and the highest-grossing non-Disney or Universal animated film until it was surpassed by Ne Zha 2 in 2025. It also remained the highest grossing film of Mike Myers' career until it was surpassed by Michael in 2026. On July 7, Spider-Man 2 reached a $200 million domestic gross in a record time of eight days. On July 18, after 19 days in release, Spider-Man 2 reached $300 million domestically in another record time. Harry Potter and the Prisoner of Azkaban has the highest international revenue of $546 million compared to Shrek 2's $487.5 million.

The Passion of the Christ, directed by Mel Gibson, became the first blockbuster motion picture of 2004 and also the highest grossing R-rated film domestically. Meet the Fockers beat 2003's Bruce Almighty record for the highest-grossing comedy film; both were released by Universal.

== Events ==
Month
Day
Event
January
25
Golden Globe Awards: Major winners include The Lord of the Rings: The Return of the King and Lost in Translation.
26
Golden Raspberry Award nominations announced, leading films are:
- 9: Gigli
- 8: The Cat in the Hat
- 8: From Justin to Kelly
- 7: Charlie's Angels: Full Throttle
27
Academy Awards nominations announced, leading films are:
- 11: The Lord of the Rings: The Return of the King
- 10: Master and Commander: The Far Side of the World
- 7: Cold Mountain
- 7: Seabiscuit
- 6: Mystic River
February
4
9th Empire Awards: Major winners include Love Actually and The Lord of the Rings: The Return of the King
15
BAFTA Awards: Major winners include Scarlett Johansson, Best Actress and Bill Murray, Best Actor
22
Screen Actors Guild Awards: Charlize Theron, The Actor for Best Female Actor, Johnny Depp, The Actor for Best Male Actor, Tim Robbins, The Actor for Best Male Supporting Actor, Renée Zellweger, The Actor for Best Female Supporting Actor.
23
The Lord of the Rings: The Return of the King becomes the second film in history to gross more than $1 billion in worldwide box office receipts.
25
The Passion of the Christ, Mel Gibson's major motion picture about the last days of Jesus's life on Earth, opens huge in time for Lent.
28
Gigli dominates the Golden Raspberry Awards, walking away with 6 awards, including Worst Picture, Worst Actress (Jennifer Lopez), Worst Actor (Ben Affleck), Worst Director (Martin Brest), Worst Screenplay (Brest) and worst on-screen couple (Lopez and Affleck). Worst supporting acting awards went to actress Demi Moore for Charlie's Angels: Full Throttle and actor Sylvester Stallone for Spy Kids 3-D: Game Over.
29
76th Academy Awards: The Lord of the Rings: The Return of the King wins picture and director awards as well as nine others for a total of 11 Academy Awards, a tie for the most ever won by a single film.
March
19
The highly acclaimed Eternal Sunshine of the Spotless Mind releases in theaters. It later went on to win Best Original Screenplay at the 77th Academy Awards.
May
22
Fahrenheit 9/11, a controversial documentary by Michael Moore wins the top prize, the Palme d'Or, at the Cannes Film Festival.
June
5
The 2004 MTV Movie Awards were held at Sony Pictures Studios in Culver City, California and hosted by Lindsay Lohan.
27
Fahrenheit 9/11 breaks the record for highest opening-weekend earnings in the United States for a documentary, earning $23.9 million. And going on to earn over $119M in domestic box office earnings.
July
1
Marlon Brando, considered by many to be the greatest actor of all time, dies at the age of 80 from respiratory failure at the UCLA Medical Center in Los Angeles.
October
27
DreamWorks Animation is spun off from DreamWorks Pictures into a separate company.
29
Voices of Iraq released, the first "wikified" documentary film created by sending multiple DV cameras to participants.
December
13
The Hollywood Foreign Press Association announced the nominees for the 2005 Golden Globes awards with comedy Sideways garnering seven nominations and actor Jamie Foxx with three for his work in both film and television.
21
The Academy of Motion Picture Arts and Sciences announces seven films are eligible for the Academy Award for Visual Effects:
- The Aviator
- The Day After Tomorrow
- Harry Potter and the Prisoner of Azkaban
- I, Robot
- Lemony Snicket's A Series of Unfortunate Events
- Sky Captain and the World of Tomorrow
- Spider-Man 2
28
The Academy of Motion Picture Arts and Sciences announces that 267 films released in 2004 are eligible for consideration of the Academy Award for Best Picture.

== Awards ==
Category/Organization	10th Critics' Choice Awards January 10, 2005	62nd Golden Globe Awards January 16, 2005		Producers, Directors, Screen Actors, and Writers Guild Awards	58th BAFTA Awards February 12, 2005	77th Academy Awards February 27, 2005
Category/Organization	10th Critics' Choice Awards January 10, 2005	Drama	Musical or Comedy	Producers, Directors, Screen Actors, and Writers Guild Awards	58th BAFTA Awards February 12, 2005	77th Academy Awards February 27, 2005
Best Film	Sideways	The Aviator	Sideways	The Aviator		Million Dollar Baby
Best Director	Martin Scorsese; The Aviator	Clint Eastwood; Million Dollar Baby			Mike Leigh; Vera Drake	Clint Eastwood; Million Dollar Baby
Best Actor	Jamie Foxx; Ray	Leonardo DiCaprio; The Aviator	Jamie Foxx; Ray			
Best Actress	Hilary Swank; Million Dollar Baby		Annette Bening; Being Julia	Hilary Swank; Million Dollar Baby	Imelda Staunton; Vera Drake	Hilary Swank; Million Dollar Baby
Best Supporting Actor	Thomas Haden Church; Sideways	Clive Owen; Closer		Morgan Freeman; Million Dollar Baby	Clive Owen; Closer	Morgan Freeman; Million Dollar Baby
Best Supporting Actress	Virginia Madsen; Sideways	Natalie Portman; Closer		Cate Blanchett; The Aviator		
Best Screenplay, Adapted	Sideways; Alexander Payne and Jim Taylor			Sideways; Alexander Payne and Jim Taylor		
Best Screenplay, Original	Sideways; Alexander Payne and Jim Taylor			Eternal Sunshine of the Spotless Mind; Charlie Kaufman, Michel Gondry, and Pierre Bismuth		
Best Animated Film	The Incredibles	—N/a	—N/a	—N/a	—N/a	The Incredibles
Best Original Score	Howard Shore; The Aviator			—N/a	Gustavo Santaolalla; The Motorcycle Diaries	Jan A. P. Kaczmarek; Finding Neverland
Best Original Song	"Old Habits Die Hard"; Alfie			—N/a	—N/a	"Al otro lado del río" The Motorcycle Diaries
Best Foreign Language Film	The Sea Inside			—N/a	The Motorcycle Diaries	The Sea Inside

Palme d'Or (57th Cannes Film Festival):

Fahrenheit 9/11, directed by Michael Moore, United States

Golden Lion (61st Venice International Film Festival):

Vera Drake, directed by Mike Leigh, United Kingdom

Golden Bear (54th Berlin International Film Festival):

Head-On (Gegen die Wand), directed by Fatih Akın, Germany

== 2004 films ==
=== By country/region ===
- List of American films of 2004
- List of Argentine films of 2004
- List of Australian films of 2004
- List of Bangladeshi films of 2004
- List of Brazilian films of 2004
- List of British films of 2004
- List of Canadian films of 2004
- List of Chinese films of 2004
  - List of Hong Kong films of 2004
- List of French films of 2004
- List of Indian films of 2004
  - List of Bengali films of 2004
  - List of Bollywood films of 2004
  - List of Kannada films of 2004
  - List of Tamil films of 2004
  - List of Telugu films of 2004
  - List of Malayalam films of 2004
- List of Italian films of 2004
- List of Japanese films of 2004
- List of Mexican films of 2004
- List of Pakistani films of 2004
- List of Russian films of 2004
- List of South Korean films of 2004
- List of Spanish films of 2004

=== By genre/medium ===
- List of action films of 2004
- List of animated feature films of 2004
- List of avant-garde films of 2004
- List of crime films of 2004
- List of comedy films of 2004
- List of drama films of 2004
- List of horror films of 2004
- List of science fiction films of 2004
- List of thriller films of 2004
- List of western films of 2004

== Births ==
- January 10 – Kaitlyn Maher, American singer and actress
- January 17 – Harry Collett, English actor
- January 25 – Rohan Chand, American actor
- February 19 – Millie Bobby Brown, English actress and producer
- March 5 – Kit Connor, English actor
- April 21 – Emma Tremblay, Canadian actress
- April 23 – Teagan Croft, Australian actress
- May 3 – Mel Maia, Brazilian actress
- May 13 – Ava Acres, American actress
- May 22
  - Summer H. Howell, Canadian actress
  - Peyton Elizabeth Lee, American actress
- June 19
  - Louis Ashbourne Serkis, English actor
  - Millie Gibson, British actress
- June 8 - Francesca Capaldi, American actress
- June 19
  - Louis Ashbourne Serkis, English actor
  - Millie Gibson, British actress
- July 2 – Caitlin Carmichael, American actress
- July 4 – Alex R. Hibbert, American actor
- July 6 – Dylan Kingwell, Canadian actor
- July 16
  - Ruby Barnhill, English actress
  - Amiah Miller, American actress
- July 17
  - Logan Allen, American actor
  - Shamon Brown Jr., American actor
- August 5 – Albert Tsai, American actor
- August 14 – Marsai Martin, American actress
- August 19 – Siena Agudong, American actress
- September 10 – Gabriel Bateman, American actor
- September 23 – Anthony Gonzalez, American actor
- October 3 – Noah Schnapp, American actor
- October 10 – Zain Al Rafeea, Syrian-born Norwegian actor
- November 1
  - Jayden Bartels, American YouTuber, singer and actress
- November 11 – Oakes Fegley, American actor
- November 16
  - Marlon Kazadi, Canadian actor
  - Jack Champion, American actor
- November 27 – Jet Jurgensmeyer, American actor
- December 5 – Jules LeBlanc, American YouTuber, singer and actress
- December 9 – Nico Parker, English actress
- December 18 - Isabella Crovetti, American actress
- December 22 – Bryce Gheisar, American actor
- December 30 – Lyliana Wray, American actress

== Deaths ==
Month	Date	Name	Age	Country	Profession	Notable films
January	2	Etta Moten Barnett	102	US	Actress	Flying Down to Rio; Gold Diggers of 1933
January	2	Lynn Cartwright	76	US	Actress	A League of Their Own; The Garbage Pail Kids Movie
January	4	Brian Gibson	59	UK	Director	What's Love Got to Do with It; Still Crazy
January	4	Jeff Nuttall	70	UK	Actor	The World Is Not Enough; Damage
January	6	Philip Gilbert	72	Canada	Actor	Superman III; Reach for the Sky
January	7	Ingrid Thulin	77	Sweden	Actress	Wild Strawberries; Cries and Whispers
January	8	Reginald H. Morris	85	UK	Cinematographer	Porky's; A Christmas Story
January	9	Lyndon Brook	77	UK	Actor	The Longest Day; Plenty
January	10	Spalding Gray	62	US	Actor	Beaches; Swimming to Cambodia
January	10	Sidney Miller	87	US	Actor, Director	The 30 Foot Bride of Candy Rock; Get Yourself a College Girl
January	13	Phillip Crosby	69	US	Actor	Robin and the 7 Hoods; None but the Brave
January	14	Catherine Craig	88	US	Actress	The Strange Love of Martha Ivers; You Were Never Lovelier
January	14	Uta Hagen	84	Germany	Actress	Reversal of Fortune; The Boys from Brazil
January	14	Ron O'Neal	66	US	Actor, Director	Super Fly; Red Dawn
January	17	Ray Stark	89	US	Producer	Funny Girl; Steel Magnolias
January	17	Noble Willingham	72	US	Actor	City Slickers; Good Morning, Vietnam
January	22	Ann Miller	83	US	Actress, Dancer	On the Town; Mulholland Drive
January	27	H.B. Haggerty	78	US	Actor	The Muppet Movie; Earthquake
January	27	Jack Paar	85	US	Actor	Easy Living; Love Nest
January	28	Elroy Hirsch	80	US	Actor	Unchained; Zero Hour!
January	28	Joe Viterelli	66	US	Actor	Analyze This; Bullets over Broadway
January	29	Andrew J. Kuehn	66	US	Director	Terror in the Aisles; Get Bruce
February	2	Bernard McEveety	79	US	Director	Ride Beyond Vengeance; Napoleon and Samantha
February	4	Michael P. Moran	59	US	Actor	Scarface; Carlito's Way
February	8	Robert F. Colesberry	57	US	Producer	Mississippi Burning; K-PAX
February	10	J. C. Quinn	63	US	Actor	The Abyss; Days of Thunder
February	11	Tony Pope	56	US	Voice Actor	Who Framed Roger Rabbit; Cats Don't Dance
February	12	Martin Jurow	92	US	Producer	Breakfast at Tiffany's; Terms of Endearment
February	13	Carole Eastman	69	US	Screenwriter	Five Easy Pieces; Man Trouble
February	13	John Trumper	80	UK	Film Editor	The Italian Job; Get Carter
February	14	Elois Jenssen	81	US	Costume Designer	Samson and Delilah; Tron
February	15	Jan Miner	86	US	Actress	Lenny; Mermaids
February	23	Carl Anderson	58	US	Singer, Actor	Jesus Christ Superstar; The Color Purple
February	23	John Randolph	88	US	Actor	Serpico; You've Got Mail
February	26	Russell Hunter	79	UK	Actor	Taste the Blood of Dracula; Up Pompeii
February	26	Ralph E. Winters	94	Canada	Film Editor	Ben-Hur; The Pink Panther
February	29	Mark Cavell	64	US	Actor	Cool Hand Luke; The Man from the Alamo
March	2	Mercedes McCambridge	87	US	Actress	All the King's Men; The Exorcist
March	3	Arthur Kempel	59	US	Composer	The Arrival; Double Impact
March	5	Walt Gorney	91	Austria	Actor	Friday the 13th; Trading Places
March	6	Frances Dee	94	US	Actress	Four Faces West; Little Women
March	7	Michael Stringer	79	UK	Production Designer, Art Director	Fiddler on the Roof; Casino Royale
March	7	Paul Winfield	64	US	Actor	The Terminator; Sounder
March	8	Robert Pastorelli	50	US	Actor	Eraser; Dances with Wolves
March	10	Wilhelm von Homburg	63	Germany	Actor	Die Hard; Ghostbusters II
March	15	René Laloux	74	France	Animator, Director	Fantastic Planet; Gandahar
March	15	John Vallone	50	US	Production Designer	Predator; Die Hard 2
March	18	Richard Marner	82	Russia	Actor	The African Queen; The Sum of All Fears
March	21	Ludmilla Tchérina	79	France	Actress, Choreographer	The Red Shoes; The Tales of Hoffmann
March	24	Richard Leech	81	Ireland	Actor	The Dam Busters; Night of the Demon
March	25	Robert Arden	81	UK	Actor	Little Shop of Horrors; A Matter of Life and Death
March	26	Fred Karlin	67	US	Composer	Westworld; The Sterile Cuckoo
March	26	Jan Sterling	82	US	Actress	Ace in the Hole; The High and the Mighty
March	27	Peter Diamond	74	UK	Stuntman, Actor	An American Werewolf in London; Highlander
March	28	Peter Ustinov	82	UK	Actor, Director	Spartacus; Topkapi
March	29	Charles Grenzbach	80	US	Sound Engineer	Platoon; The Godfather
March	29	Simone Renant	93	France	Actress	No Pity for Women; Bedevilled
April	1	Carrie Snodgress	58	US	Actress	Diary of a Mad Housewife; Pale Rider
April	4	Ralph Kemplen	91	UK	Film Editor	The African Queen; The Dark Crystal
April	4	Austin Willis	87	Canada	Actor	Goldfinger; Firefox
April	7	Victor Argo	69	US	Actor	King of New York; Bad Lieutenant
April	17	Bruce Boa	73	Canada	Actor	The Empire Strikes Back; Full Metal Jacket
April	18	Frances Rafferty	81	US	Actress	The Hidden Eye; Money Madness
April	19	Tim Burstall	77	UK	Director, Screenwriter	Kangaroo; Attack Force Z
April	19	Philip Locke	76	UK	Actor	Thunderball; Porridge
April	21	Mary Selway	68	UK	Casting Director	Raiders of the Lost Ark; Love Actually
April	25	Albert Paulsen	78	US	Actor	The Manchurian Candidate; The Laughing Policeman
May	1	Nelson Gidding	84	US	Screenwriter	I Want to Live!; The Haunting
May	3	Anthony Ainley	71	UK	Actor	The Land That Time Forgot; The Blood on Satan's Claw
May	4	Hugh Gillin	78	US	Actor	Back to the Future Part III; Psycho II
May	5	Vern Taylor	71	US	Actor	An Officer and a Gentleman; Harry and the Hendersons
May	6	Virginia Capers	78	US	Actress	Ferris Bueller's Day Off; Beethoven's 2nd
May	9	Tommy Farrell	82	US	Actress	Breakfast at Tiffany's; Singin' in the Rain
May	9	Alan King	76	US	Actor, Producer	Just Tell Me What You Want; Casino
May	14	Anna Lee	91	UK	Actress	The Sound of Music; How Green Was My Valley
May	17	Tony Randall	84	US	Actor	Pillow Talk; Will Success Spoil Rock Hunter?
May	18	Lincoln Kilpatrick	73	US	Actor	The Omega Man; Soylent Green
May	23	Trudy Marshall	84	US	Actress	The Fighting Sullivans; Once Is Not Enough
May	27	Patience Cleveland	73	US	Actress	Donnie Darko; Psycho III
May	28	Irene Manning	91	US	Actress	Yankee Doodle Dandy; The Desert Song
May	31	Robert A. Burns	60	US	Art Director	The Texas Chain Saw Massacre; Re-Animator
June	3	Harold Goodwin	86	UK	Actor	The Bridge on the River Kwai; The Longest Day
June	4	Charles Correll	60	US	Cinematographer	Animal House; Star Trek III: The Search for Spock
June	4	Nino Manfredi	83	Italy	Actor, Director	Between Miracles; Café Express
June	4	Anthony Steffen	73	Italy	Actor	Django the Bastard; Sodom and Gomorrah
June	5	Virginia North	58	UK	Actress	On Her Majesty's Secret Service; The Abominable Dr. Phibes
June	5	Mark Northover	54	UK	Actor	Willow; Hardware
June	5	Ronald Reagan	93	US	Actor, 40th President of the United States	Knute Rockne, All American; Kings Row
June	6	Judy Campbell	88	UK	Actress	Convoy; Mr. Forbush and the Penguins
June	7	Donald Trumbull	95	US	Visual Effects Artist	Star Wars; Close Encounters of the Third Kind
June	9	Barbara Whiting	73	US	Actress	Beware, My Lovely; Dangerous When Wet
June	10	Ray Charles	73	US	Singer, Actor	The Blues Brothers; Spy Hard
June	13	Robert Lees	91	US	Screenwriter	Abbott and Costello Meet Frankenstein; The Black Cat
June	14	Max Rosenberg	89	US	Producer	Scream and Scream Again; Tales from the Crypt
June	18	Doris Dowling	81	US	Actress	The Lost Weekend; Bitter Rice
June	18	George Buck Flower	66	US	Actor	Back to the Future; They Live
June	19	Colin McCormack	62	UK	Actor	Death Line; First Knight
June	26	Muriel Angelus	92	UK	Actress	The Way of All Flesh; The Great McGinty
June	30	Chris Alcaide	80	US	Actor	The Big Heat; Gunslinger
July	1	Marlon Brando	80	US	Actor	On the Waterfront; The Godfather
July	6	Eric Douglas	46	US	Actor	The Golden Child; The Flamingo Kid
July	6	Jimmie F. Skaggs	59	US	Actor	Lethal Weapon; Catch Me If You Can
July	9	Carlo Di Palma	79	Italy	Cinematographer	Blowup; Bullets over Broadway
July	9	Isabel Sanford	86	US	Actress	Guess Who's Coming to Dinner; Lady Sings the Blues
July	11	Dorothy Hart	82	US	Actress	The Naked City; Tarzan's Savage Fury
July	12	Jeff Morris	69	US	Actor	The Blues Brothers; Kelly's Heroes
July	13	George Mallaby	64	UK	Actor	The Spy Who Loved Me; Eliza Fraser
July	17	Pat Roach	67	UK	Actor	Raiders of the Lost Ark; A Clockwork Orange
July	18	Richard Ney	87	US	Actor	Mrs. Miniver; Ivy
July	19	Irvin Yeaworth	78	Germany	Director	The Blob; 4D Man
July	21	Jerry Goldsmith	75	US	Composer	Alien; Patton
July	22	Muriel Angelus	92	UK	Actress	The Great McGinty; The Light That Failed
July	23	Serge Reggiani	82	Italy	Actor, Singer	The Leopard; La terrazza
July	27	Sam Edwards	89	US	Actor	Twelve O'Clock High; Operation Pacific
July	28	Eugene Roche	75	US	Actor	The Late Show; Foul Play
July	31	Laura Betti	77	Italy	Actress	Theorem; 1900
July	31	Virginia Grey	87	US	Actress	All That Heaven Allows; The Big Store
August	1	Vivian Austin	84	US	Actress	Destiny; Philo Vance Returns
August	3	Geraldine Peroni	51	US	Film Editor	Brokeback Mountain; The Player
August	8	Paul Garner	95	US	Actor	Rhinestone; Saturday the 14th
August	8	Fay Wray	96	Canada	Actress	King Kong; The Most Dangerous Game
August	9	David Raksin	92	US	Composer	Laura; The Bad and the Beautiful
August	12	Peter Woodthorpe	72	UK	Actor	The Lord of the Rings; The Madness of King George
August	16	Mildred "Acquanetta" Davenport	83	US	Actress	Tarzan and the Leopard Woman; Captive Wild Woman
August	18	Elmer Bernstein	82	US	Composer	Ghostbusters; To Kill a Mockingbird
August	18	Hugh Manning	83	UK	Actor	The Elephant Man; The Dam Busters
August	22	Daniel Petrie	83	Canada	Director	A Raisin in the Sun; Cocoon: The Return
August	25	Donald M. Ashton	85	UK	Production Designer	The Bridge on the River Kwai; Indiscreet
August	26	David Myers	90	US	Cinematographer	THX 1138; Woodstock
August	27	William Pierson	78	US	Actor	Stalag 17; Corvette Summer
August	30	Bob Sherman	63	US	Actor	Hellboy; The Spy Who Loved Me
September	8	Frank Thomas	92	US	Animator	Lady and the Tramp; The Aristocats
September	9	Caitlin Clarke	52	US	Actress	Crocodile Dundee; Blown Away
September	10	O. L. Duke	51	US	Actor	Malcolm X; Antwone Fisher
September	11	Michael A. Carter	77	UK	Sound Engineer	Aliens; Eyes Wide Shut
September	11	Fred Ebb	76	US	Lyricist	Chicago; New York, New York
September	15	Bernard Gribble	77	UK	Film Editor	Top Secret!; Death Wish
September	17	Evi Rauer	88	Estonia	Actress	Libahunt
September	18	Russ Meyer	82	US	Director	Faster, Pussycat! Kill! Kill!; Beyond the Valley of the Dolls
September	19	Annabella Incontrera	61	Italy	Actress	The Assassination Bureau; The Silencers
September	19	Robert Lawrence	90	Canada	Film Editor	Spartacus; Fiddler on the Roof
September	24	Tim Choate	49	US	Actor	Soapdish; Pearl Harbor
September	30	Michael Relph	89	UK	Producer	Kind Hearts and Coronets; Scum
September	30	Ignatius Wolfington	83	US	Actor	1941; Herbie Rides Again
October	3	Janet Leigh	77	US	Actress	Psycho; Touch of Evil
October	5	Rodney Dangerfield	82	US	Actor, Comedian	Caddyshack; Back to School
October	8	Irina Demick	67	France	Actress	The Longest Day; Prudence and the Pill
October	10	Christopher Reeve	52	US	Actor	Superman; The Remains of the Day
October	17	Julius Harris	81	US	Actor	The Taking of Pelham One Two Three; Live and Let Die
October	26	Patricia Knight	89	US	Actress	Shockproof; Roses Are Red
October	28	Gil Mellé	72	US	Composer	The Andromeda Strain; The Ultimate Warrior
October	28	Charles F. Wheeler	88	US	Cinematographer	Tora! Tora! Tora!; Silent Running
October	30	Peggy Ryan	80	US	Actress, Dancer	When Johnny Comes Marching Home; All Ashore
October	31	Mari Aldon	78	Lithuania	Actress	Distant Drums; Tangier Incident
November	6	Robert Lang	70	UK	Actor	Four Weddings and a Funeral; Wilde
November	6	Elizabeth Rogers	70	US	Actress	An Officer and a Gentleman; The Towering Inferno
November	6	Edward Warschilka	76	Hungary	Film Editor	Harold and Maude; Child's Play
November	7	Howard Keel	85	US	Actor	Seven Brides for Seven Brothers; Show Boat
November	9	Ed Kemmer	83	US	Actor	Earth vs. the Spider; The Crowded Sky
November	12	Norman Rose	87	US	Actor	The Front; The Anderson Tapes
November	13	Carlo Rustichelli	87	Italy	Composer	Avanti!; Alfredo, Alfredo
November	13	Don Sharpe	75	UK	Sound Engineer	Aliens; Batman
November	14	Michel Colombier	65	France	Composer	White Nights; Purple Rain
November	19	Helmut Griem	72	Germany	Actor	Cabaret; Voyage of the Damned
November	20	Anna Keaveney	55	UK	Actress	Vera Drake; Formula 51
November	22	Jerry Bick	81	US	Producer	The Long Goodbye; Swing Shift
November	25	David Bailey	71	US	Actor	Wicked, Wicked; Above the Rim
November	26	Philippe de Broca	71	France	Director, Screenwriter	That Man from Rio; King of Hearts
November	27	John Drew Barrymore	72	US	Actor	Pontius Pilate; Guerra di Troia
November	28	Molly Weir	94	UK	Actress	The Prime of Miss Jean Brodie; Scrooge
December	1	William Sackheim	85	US	Screenwriter, Producer	First Blood; The In-Laws
December	4	Carl Esmond	102	Austria	Actor	Sergeant York; Ministry of Fear
December	9	Jean Tournier	78	France	Cinematographer	The Day of the Jackal; Moonraker
December	10	John Monks Jr.	94	US	Screenwriter	Knock on Any Door; The People Against O'Hara
December	15	Maria Perschy	66	Austria	Actress	Man's Favorite Sport?; The Password is Courage
December	16	Stefano Madia	49	Italy	Actor	Dear Father; The Palermo Connection
December	20	Howard Feuer	56	US	Casting Director	The Silence of the Lambs; Moonstruck
December	21	Richard Hamilton	83	US	Actor	Men in Black; Pale Rider
December	28	Jerry Orbach	69	US	Actor	Dirty Dancing; Beauty and the Beast
December	29	William Boyett	77	US	Actor	When a Stranger Calls; Newsies
December	29	Liddy Holloway	57	New Zealand	Actress	Without a Paddle; Queen City Rocker

== Film debuts ==
- Emily Blunt – My Summer of Love
- Yvette Nicole Brown – Little Black Book
- Eddie Cahill – Miracle
- Josh Duhamel – The Picture of Dorian Gray
- Brian F. Durkin – Bobby Jones: Stroke of Genius
- Alice Eve – Stage Beauty
- Rebecca Ferguson – Drowning Ghost
- Will Forte – Around the World in 80 Days
- Nick Frost – Shaun of the Dead
- David Harbour – Kinsey
- Amber Heard – Friday Night Lights
- Jon Heder – Napoleon Dynamite
- Ed Helms – Blackballed: The Bobby Dukes Story
- Jonah Hill – I Heart Huckabees
- Cheryl Hines – Along Came Polly
- Marin Ireland – The Manchurian Candidate
- Arielle Kebbel – Soul Plane
- Toby Kebbell – Dead Man's Shoes
- Rebekah Kochan – Eating Out
- Riki Lindhome – Seeing Other People
- Jason Mantzoukas – Terrorists
- Joel McHale – Spider-Man 2
- Denis Ménochet – Automne
- Jason Momoa – Johnson Family Vacation
- Mircea Monroe – Cellular
- Keke Palmer – Barbershop 2: Back in Business
- Chris Pine – The Princess Diaries 2: Royal Engagement
- Alba Rohrwacher – An Italian Romance
- Belén Rueda – The Sea Inside
- Catalina Sandino Moreno – Maria Full of Grace
- Amanda Seyfried – Mean Girls
- Cobie Smulders – Walking Tall
- Olivia Wilde – The Girl Next Door
- Patrick Wilson – The Alamo
