= Justus Drew Doenecke =

American historian

- Born: March 5, 1938 (age 88); Brooklyn, New York
- Education: Colgate University; Princeton University
- Occupations: Historian, writer, and professor
- Spouse: Carol Anne Soukup
- Writing career
- Notable awards: Herbert Hoover Book Award (2000)

Justus Drew Doenecke (born March 5, 1938) is an American historian, writer, and professor. His 2000 book, Storm on the Horizon: the Challenge to American Intervention, 1939-1941, received the Herbert Hoover Book Award from the Herbert Hoover Presidential Library and Museum. Doenecke is Professor Emeritus at New College of Florida.

== Education ==
Doenecke was born on March 5, 1938, in Brooklyn, New York, to Justus Christian and Eleanore Howard (née Smith) Doenecke. In 1960, he graduated magna cum laude from Colgate University with his Bachelor of Arts degree. Doenecke earned his Master's degree and Ph.D. in History from Princeton University in 1962 and 1966, respectively.

== Career ==
Doenecke was an Instructor of History at Colgate University from 1963 to 1964, and was instructor, then assistant professor, at Ohio Wesleyan University from 1965 to 1969. He rose from assistant professor to full professor at New College of Florida (from 1975 to 2001 New College of the University of South Florida) from 1966 to 2005, before being named Professor Emeritus of History in 2005.

He is the author of more than ten books. Doenecke's book Storm on the Horizon: The Challenge to American Intervention, 1939-1941 was the 2000 recipient for the Herbert Hoover Book Award for best book on any topic of American history within the years 1914–64, the years of Hoover's public life. The topics of Doenecke's books vary. He has written about the presidency of James A. Garfield and Chester A. Arthur, the United States' entry into World War I, the New Deal, Franklin D. Roosevelt's general foreign policy, World War II, and the Cold War. Doenecke has also contributed to various reference books and has written articles and book reviews for scholarly journals.

Doenecke's documentary edition of the America First Committee won the Arthur S. Link Prize for Documentary Editing from the Society for Historians of American Foreign Relations.

Doenecke is a member of many associations, which are as follows: Society for Historians of American Foreign Relations, the American Historical Association, Organization of American Historians, Phi Beta Kappa Society, and the Historical Society of the Episcopal Church.

== Personal life ==
Doenecke married Carol Anne Soukup, merchandizer and later a pastel artist, on March 21, 1970. He identifies as Episcopalian.

== Publications ==
=== Articles & Essays ===
- "Harry Elmer Barnes." Wisconsin Magazine of History, vol. 56, no. 4 (Summer 1973), pp. 311–23. JSTOR 4634822.
- "Non-interventionism of the Left: The Keep America Out of the War Congress, 1938-41." Journal of Contemporary History, vol. 12, no. 2 (Apr. 1977), pp. 221-236. doi:10.1177/002200947701200201.
- "Principle and Expediency: The State Department and Palestine, 1948." Journal of Libertarian Studies, vol. 2, no. 4 (1978), pp. 343–56.
- "The Isolationist as Collectivist: Lawrence Dennis and The Coming of World War II." Journal of Libertarian Studies, vol. 3, no. 2 (1979), pp. 191-207.
- "Toward an Isolationist Braintrust: The Foundation for Foreign Affairs." World Affairs, vol. 143, no. 3 (Winter 1980), pp. 264–77. JSTOR 20671864.
- "The Anti-interventionist Tradition: Leadership and Perceptions." Literature of Liberty, vol. 4, no. 2 (Summer 1981), pp. 7–67. Full issue. A bibliographical essay.
- "Edwin M. Borchard, John Bassett Moore, and Opposition to American Intervention in World War II." Journal of Libertarian Studies, vol. 6, no. 1 (Winter 1982), pp. 1–34.
- "American Isolationism, 1939-1941." Journal of Libertarian Studies, vol. 6, no. 3-4 (1982), pp. 201–16.
- "Explaining the Antiwar Movement, 1939-1941: The Next Assignment." Journal of Libertarian Studies, vol. 8, no. 1 (Winter 1986), pp. 139–62.
- "The Anti-Interventionism of Herbert Hoover." Journal of Libertarian Studies, vol. 8, no. 2 (Summer 1987), pp. 311-40.
- "How FDR Created the Surveillance State." The Daily Beast (May 10, 2015).
- "Naught Without Labor: A Half Century of Exploration into Twentieth-Century American Intervention and Its Critics." H-DIPLO (Mar. 2020).

=== Bibliographies ===
- The Literature of Isolationism: A Guide to Non-Interventionist Scholarship, 1930-1972. Colorado Springs: Ralph Myles (1972).
- "Literature of Isolationism, 1972–1983: A Bibliographic Guide." Journal of Libertarian Studies, vol. 7, no. 1 (1983), pp. 157–184. Full issue.

This essay supplements (not replaces) the earlier Literature of Isolationism (1972). Written for a 1980 seminar sponsored by the World Without War Council in Berkeley, California, then updated further.

=== Books ===
- From Isolation to War, 1931-1941. New York: Thomas Y. Crowell Company (1968).
- The Literature of Isolationism: A Guide to Non-Interventionist Scholarship, 1930-1972. Colorado Springs: Ralph Myles (1972).
- Not to the Swift: the Old Isolationists in the Cold War Era. Lewisberg, Pa.: Bucknell University Press (1979). ISBN 978-0838722893.
- The Diplomacy of Frustration: The Manchurian Crisis of 1931-1933 as Revealed in the Papers of Stanley K. Hornbeck (1981). ISBN 978-0817973117.
- The Presidencies of James A. Garfield & Chester A. Arthur. Lawrence: Regents Press of Kansas (1981). ISBN 978-0700602087.
- When the Wicked Rise: American Opinion-Makers and the Manchurian Crisis of 1931-1933. Lewisberg, Pa.: Bucknell University Press (1984). ISBN 978-0838750483.
- In Danger Undaunted: the Anti-Interventionist Movement of 1940-1941 as Revealed in the Papers of the America First Committee (1990). ISBN 978-0817988425.
- The Battle Against Intervention, 1939-1941. Malabar, Fla.: Krieger (1997). ISBN 978-0894649011. OCLC 34690744.
- Storm on the Horizon: The Challenge to American Intervention, 1939-1941 (2000). ISBN 9780742507845. OCLC 43859534.
- The New Deal. Malabar, Fla.: Krieger (2003). ISBN 978-1575240831. OCLC 48940677.
- Debating Franklin D. Roosevelt's Foreign Policies, with Mark A. Stoler. New York: Rowman & Littlefield (2005). ISBN 978-0847694167. OCLC 56793815.
- Nothing Less Than War: A New History of America's Entry into World War I. University Press of Kentucky (2011). ISBN 978-0813145501. JSTOR j.ctt2jcfv4.

=== Book reviews ===
- Review of Selling War: The British Propaganda Campaign Against American "Neutrality" in World War II, by Nicholas J. Cull. Independent Review, vol. 1, no. 2 (Fall 1996).
- Review of Desperate Deception: British Covert Operations in the United States, 1939–1944, by Thomas E. Mahl. Independent Review, vol. 4, no. 1 (Summer 1999).
- Review of Means of Grace: A Year of Weekly Devotions, by Fleming Rutledge. Anglican Theological Review, vol. 104, no. 1 (Feb. 2022), pp. 99-100. doi:10.1177/00033286211067197.

=== Contributions ===
- "Power, Markets, and Ideology: The Isolationist Response to Roosevelt Policy, 1940-1941." In: Liggio, Leonard P., and James J. Martin, eds. Watershed of Empire: Essays on New Deal Foreign Policy, with a preface by Felix Morley. Colorado Spring: Ralph Myles (1976). pp. 132-161. ISBN 0879260203.

=== Encyclopedic and reference ===
- "Isolationism." In: Oxford Research Encyclopedia of American History. Oxford University Press. doi:10.1093/acrefore/9780199329175.013.49.
