= Harry Elmer Barnes =

American historian and Holocaust denier (1889–1968)

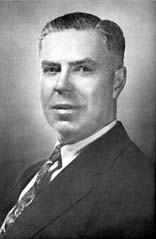
- Born: June 15, 1889; Auburn, New York, U.S.
- Died: August 25, 1968 (aged 79); Malibu, California, U.S.
- Occupation: Historian

Harry Elmer Barnes (June 15, 1889 – August 25, 1968) was an American historian who, in his later years, was known for his historical revisionism and Holocaust denial.

After receiving a PhD at Columbia University in 1918 Barnes became a professor of history at Clark University before moving to Smith College as a professor of historical sociology in 1923. In 1929 he left teaching to work as a journalist, freelance writer and occasional adjunct professor at smaller schools. In 1919–20 and between 1923 and 1937 he lectured regularly at the New School for Social Research. Through his prodigious scholarly output, Barnes was once highly regarded as a historian. By the 1950s, however, he had lost credibility and became a "professional pariah".

Barnes published more than 30 books, 100 essays, and 600 articles and book reviews, many for the Council on Foreign Relations journal Foreign Affairs, where he served as Bibliographical Editor.

== Early career ==
Front cover of Harry Elmer Barnes, Learned Crusader, by Arthur Goddard, ed.

Barnes took a PhD at Columbia in 1918 in history with a study in the history of penology. He was among the graduate students of William Archibald Dunning, who was influential in the history of the Reconstruction era in the United States. In 1917 Barnes published the first edition of An Introduction to the History of Sociology, a collaborative work intended to be a comprehensive summary of sociological development. Barnes lectured widely between 1918 and 1941 on current events and recent history.

During World War I, Barnes had been a strong supporter of the war effort; his anti-German propaganda was rejected by the National Board for Historical Service, which described it as "too violent to be acceptable". After the war, Barnes' views towards Germany reversed: he became as much of a Germanophile as he previously had been Germanophobic. Barnes took the view that the United States had fought on the wrong side in World War I.

In the 1920s, Barnes was noted as a vehement advocate that Germany had borne no responsibility for the outbreak of war in 1914, and had instead been the victim of Allied aggression. In 1922, Barnes was arguing that the responsibility for World War I was split evenly between the Allies and the Central Powers. By 1924, Barnes was writing that Austria-Hungary was the power most responsible for the war, but that Russia and France were more responsible than Germany. By 1926, Barnes argued that Russia and France bore the entire responsibility for the outbreak of war in 1914, and the Central Powers none. In Barnes' view, "vested political and historical interests" were behind the "official" account that Germany started World War I.

Barnes' research on the origins of World War I was generously funded in the 1920s by the German Foreign Ministry, which intended to prove that Germany had not started World War I, as a way of trying to undermine the Treaty of Versailles. In Barnes' articles on the causes of World War I in The Nation, Current History, The Christian Century, and above all in his 1926 book The Genesis of the World War, he portrayed France and Russia as the aggressors of the July Crisis of 1914, and Germany and Austria-Hungary as the victims of a Franco-Russian plot. In 1922 he wrote an article for the first issue of Foreign Affairs, the foreign policy journal published by the Council on Foreign Relations, having earlier contributed book reviews to The Journal for International Relations, which became Foreign Affairs in 1922. After 1924, Barnes had a close relationship with the Centre for the Study of the Causes of the War, a pseudo-historical think-tank based in Berlin secretly funded by the German government and founded by Major Alfred von Wegerer, the former völkisch activist. The centre's sole purpose was to prove Germany was the victim of aggression in 1914, and that the Versailles treaty was morally invalid. The Centre provided Barnes with research material, made funds available to him, translated his writings into other languages, and funded his trip to Germany in 1926. During Barnes' 1926 trip to Germany, the writer was welcomed for his efforts to, as Barnes described it, "clear Germany of the dishonour and fraud of the war-guilt clause of the Treaty of Versailles".

During his European trip, Barnes met with the former German Emperor, Wilhelm II, at his estate in the Netherlands. According to Barnes, the ex-ruler said that he "was happy to know that I did not blame him for starting the war in 1914." However, Barnes added, "He disagreed with my view that Russia and France were chiefly responsible. He held that the villains of 1914 were the international Jews and Free Masons, who, he alleged, desired to destroy national states and the Christian religion".

In addition, during this 1926 trip Barnes met all of the surviving German and Austrian leaders of 1914. Based on their statements, he was confirmed in his belief that Germany was not responsible for World War I. To assist Barnes with his writings against the so-called Kriegschuldlüge ("war guilt lie"), the Germans put Barnes into contact with Milos Boghitschewitsch, a former Serbian diplomat living in Berlin. He was considered disreputable as, in exchange for German gold, he provided false testimony about the actions of the Serbian government in 1914.

In 1926, Barnes published The Genesis of the World War, the first American book written about 1914 that was based upon the available primary sources. He argued that World War I was the result of a Franco-Russian plot to destroy Germany. Wegerer wrote about The Genesis of the World War that it would be "scarcely possible to provide a better book than this one".

Barnes was opposed to the idea of World War I as "just war", which he believed to have been caused by the economic imperialism of France and Russia. In 1925, Barnes wrote: "If we can but understand how totally and terribly we were 'taken in' between 1914 and 1918 by the salesmen of this most holy and idealistic world conflict, we shall be the better prepared to be on our guard against the seductive lies and deceptions which will be put forward by similar groups when urging the necessity of another world catastrophe in order to 'crush militarism', 'make the world safe for democracy', put an end to all further wars, etc."

In his preface to The Genesis of the World War, Barnes called World War I an "unjust war against Germany". Barnes wrote in his preface that "the truth about the causes of the World War is one of the livest and most important practical issues of the present day. It is basic to the whole matter of the present European and world situation, resting as it does upon an unfair and unjust Peace Treaty, which was itself erected upon a most uncritical and complete acceptance of the grossest forms of war-time illusions concerning war guilt."

Barnes said when writing The Genesis of the World War, he was compelled by "an ardent desire to execute an adequate exposure of the authors of the late World War in particular". According to Barnes, the responsibility for World War I was as follows: "In estimating the order of guilt of the various countries we may safely say that the only direct and immediate responsibility for the World War falls upon Serbia, France and Russia, with the guilt about equally distributed. Next in order—far below France and Russia—would come Austria, though she never desired a general European war. Finally, we place Germany and England as tied for last place, both being opposed to war in the 1914 crisis. Probably the German public was somewhat more favorable to military activity than the English people, but ... the Kaiser made much more strenuous efforts to preserve the peace of Europe in 1914 than did Sir Edward Grey."

The German government so liked Barnes's writings on the causes of World War I that it provided free copies of his articles to hand out at German embassies around the world. Though most German historians in the 1920s regarded Barnes merely as a propagandist whose work was mainly meant to appeal to a mass as opposed to an academic audience, the right-wing German historian Hans Herzfeld called Barnes's work "a document in the struggle against the war guilt thesis whose noble spirit cannot be appreciated enough". The German-Canadian historian Holger Herwig has commented that Barnes's work on the origins of World War I, together with others of a similar bent, did immense scholarly damage, as generations of university students accepted Barnes' "apologias" for Germany as the truth. In 1969, the British historian A. J. P. Taylor called The Genesis of the World War "the most preposterously pro-German" account of the outbreak of war in 1914.

In 1926, the American historian Bernadotte Schmitt wrote about The Genesis of the World War that: "It must be said that Mr. Barnes' book falls short of being the objective and scientific analysis of the great problems which is so urgently needed. As a protest against the old notion of unique German responsibility for the war, it will be welcomed by all honest men, but as an attempt to set up a new doctrine of unique Franco-Russian responsibility, it must be unhesitatingly rejected. The war was a consequence, perhaps inevitable, of the whole system of alliances and armaments, and in the origin, development, and working of that system, the Central Powers, more particularly Germany, played a conspicuous part. Indeed, it was Germany that put the system to the test in July 1914. Because the test failed, she is not entitled to claim that no responsibility attaches to her."

In 1980, the American historian Lucy Dawidowicz wrote that the work of so-called World War I revisionists like Barnes has been discredited since 1961 when the German historian Fritz Fischer published his book Griff nach der Weltmacht (Grasping at World Power).

Barnes's very public attacks on the idea of World War I as a just war, and his thesis that the United States should not have fought in the war, won him the admiration and friendship in the 1920s of many people in the United States such as Oswald Garrison Villard, the Socialist leader Norman Thomas, the critic H. L. Mencken, and the historian Charles A. Beard. Long regarded as a leader of the progressive intelligentsia, Barnes joined many of its intellectual leaders such as Beard in opposing from the left the New Deal and, at the price of their reputations, American entry into World War II. Later, he argued that Adolf Hitler did not want to go to war with the United States and that President Franklin D. Roosevelt had provoked the attack on Pearl Harbor. He also contested many aspects of the Holocaust, claiming death figures were far lower and arguing that all sides were guilty of equally awful atrocities.

== World War II ==
In the late 1930s, Barnes emerged as a leading isolationist and German apologist who defended German foreign policy as a legitimate effort to overthrow the Treaty of Versailles, which Barnes regarded as monstrously unfair to Germany. In 1937, Barnes identified as a "noninterventionist". After the outbreak of World War II, Barnes continued to expound his pre-war views of European diplomacy.

In 1939, Barnes published an article that claimed British diplomat Sir Robert Vansittart was "scheming to commit aggression" against Germany in the late 1930s. As a result, Vansittart sued Barnes for libel. In a letter to his friend Oswald Villard, Barnes said that Vansittart's libel suit against him was a "plot of the Jews and the Anti-Defamation League to intimidate any American historians who propose to tell the truth about the causes of the war". Barnes said that Louis Nizer, Vansittart's lawyer, was an "Anti-Defamation League stooge" who had "needled Vansittart into action". The American historian Deborah Lipstadt has documented that the Anti-Defamation League had nothing to do with Vansittart or his libel suit against Barnes. She says that Barnes' claims otherwise were a sign of his anti-Semitism.

In 1940, the New York World-Telegram newspaper dropped Barnes' weekly column. The writer responded by complaining the action was due to a conspiracy against him, involving MI6 intelligence service, the House of Morgan, and all of the Jewish department store owners in New York City. Barnes alleged that the latter had threatened the publisher of the World-Telegram with the "loss of all advertising if he kept me on any longer".

Barnes' allegations of warmongering in both government and in the historical profession alienated colleagues and made it difficult for his writings to gain publication. Most of Barnes' work after 1945 was self-published. Dawidowicz writes that Barnes grew "progressively paranoid, seeing sinister plots and powerful enemies everywhere". In particular, Barnes claimed that a "historical black-out" had covered up the real origins of World War II. In his 1947 pamphlet, "The Struggle Against The Historical Blackout", Barnes claimed that "court historians" suppressed that Hitler was the most "reasonable" leader in the world in 1939, and that France's Premier Édouard Daladier wanted to commit aggression against Germany, aided and abetted by British Prime Minister Neville Chamberlain and the U.S. President Franklin D. Roosevelt. In the same pamphlet, Barnes claimed that, as part of the alleged smear campaign that had been committed against Germany, Allied governments had falsely charged Germany with responsibility for crimes that it did not commit.

In 1948, Barnes wrote to Villard, saying that Winston Churchill and Roosevelt, "backed by certain pressure groups", caused the outbreak of war in 1939. Later in 1948, Barnes wrote a statement saying that France had repeatedly committed aggression against Germany, and that, "Offhand I cannot recall a really unprovoked German invasion of France in modern times". Barnes' statement contained a list of every French invasion of Germany starting in 1552 and ended with: "1918 French invade Germany with American aid. 1944–45 French again ride into Germany on the backs of the Americans."

In a letter to his friend Charles Tansill in 1950, Barnes described German foreign policy in 1939 as the "most reasonable of them all". Barnes wrote that Chamberlain was "almost solely responsible for the outbreak of war on both the Eastern and Western fronts." In Barnes' view, Germany did not "precipitously launch" an invasion of Poland in 1939, but was instead "forced" into war by "acts of economic strangulation" issued by the Chamberlain cabinet.

In a 1953 essay, "Revisionism and the Historical Black-out", which appeared in Barnes' self-published book, Perpetual War for Perpetual Peace, he wrote: "It is no exaggeration to say that the American Smearbund, operating through newspaper editors and columnists, 'hatchet-men' book reviewers, radio commentators, pressure-group intrigue and espionage, and academic pressures and fears, has accomplished about as much in the way of intimidating honest intellectuals in this country as Hitler, Goebbels, Himmler, the Gestapo, and concentration camps were able to do in Nazi Germany."

Barnes opposed the United States fighting in the Korean War. Dawidowicz writes that in this period he was acquainted with some radical libertarian writers including James J. Martin.

== Holocaust denial ==
In 1955, Barnes first met David Hoggan, and played a key role in helping Hoggan adapt his 1948 PhD dissertation, The Breakdown of German-Polish Relations in 1939: The Conflict Between the German New Order and the Polish Idea of Central Eastern Europe, into his 1961 book, Der erzwungene Krieg (The Forced War). It was "based on, but quite different from, the dissertation", and Hoggan blamed the Allies for the outbreak of World War II. In 1963, Barnes self-published a pamphlet, "Blasting the Historical Black-out", in which he offered some praise for A. J. P. Taylor's 1961 book, The Origins of the Second World War. Barnes said that he thought Hoggan's book was better than Taylor's. Barnes referred to the "alleged wartime crimes of Germany" and wrote that, "Even assuming that all the charges ever made by the Nazis by anybody of reasonable sanity and responsibility are true, the Allies did not come off much, if any better". The ethnic Germans expelled from Czechoslovakia and Poland after World War II, Barnes asserted, experienced hardships "obviously far more hideous and prolonged than those of the Jews said to have been exterminated in great numbers by the Nazis."

A hostile review of Der erzwungene Krieg, noting its publisher's Nazi connections, appeared in the American Historical Review in October 1962, by the American historian Gerhard Weinberg. Barnes and Hoggan wrote a series of letters rebutting Weinberg's arguments. Weinberg in turn wrote letters replying to and rebutting the arguments of Hoggan and Barnes. The exchanges between Hoggan and Barnes on one side and Weinberg on the other became increasingly rancorous and vitriolic; in October 1963, the editors of the American Historical Review announced that (in the interests of decorum) they would cease publishing letters relating to Hoggan's book.

Around this time, Barnes started to cite the French Holocaust denier Paul Rassinier, whom Barnes described as a "distinguished French historian" who had exposed the "exaggerations of the atrocity stories". In a 1964 article entitled "Zionist Fraud", published in The American Mercury, Barnes wrote: "The courageous author [Rassinier] lays the chief blame for misrepresentation on those whom we must call the swindlers of the crematoria, the Israeli politicians who derive billions of marks from nonexistent, mythical and imaginary cadavers, whose numbers have been reckoned in an unusually distorted and dishonest manner." In 1964, Barnes and Rassinier met and became friends. As a result, Barnes translated Rassinier's book The Drama of the European Jews into English; it was published by an antisemitic publishing house named Liberty Bell.

Using Rassinier as his source, Barnes claimed that Germany was the victim of aggression in both 1914 and 1939, and that the Holocaust was propaganda to justify a war of aggression against Germany in the latter case. Barnes thought that World War II had ended in disaster for the West, because Germany was divided and the United States locked into the Cold War. Barnes thought that this was a terrible outcome, as he asserted that Germany never wanted war. Barnes claimed that, in order to justify the "horrors and evils of the Second World War", the Allies made the Nazis the "scapegoat" for their own misdeeds.

Barnes said there were two false claims made about World War II; namely, that Germany started the war in 1939, and that it conducted the Holocaust. In Barnes' opinion: "Hitler setting off the war was also deemed responsible for the wholesale extermination of the Jews, for it was admitted that this did not begin until a considerable time after war broke out." Barnes said: "The size of the German reparations to Israel has been based on the theory that vast numbers of Jews were exterminated at the express order of Hitler, some six million being the most usually accepted number" (emphasis in the original).

Barnes repeated his ideas many times. In his 1966 essay "Revisionism: A Key to Peace", Barnes wrote: "Even if one were to accept the most extreme and exaggerated indictment of Hitler and the National Socialists for their activities after 1939 made by anybody fit to remain outside a mental hospital, it is most alarmingly easy to demonstrate that the atrocities of the Allies in the same period were more numerous as to victims and were carried out for the most part by methods more brutal and painful than that alleged extermination in gas ovens." (Emphasis in the original.)

In his 1967 pamphlet, "The Public Stake in Revisionism", Barnes wrote that the trial of Adolf Eichmann in 1961 showed "an almost adolescent gullibility and excitability on the part of Americans relative to German wartime crimes, real or alleged" (emphasis in original). Barnes described the expulsion of Germans from Eastern Europe as the "final solution" for the German people. Writing of the expulsion of the ethnic Germans from the Sudetenland region of Czechoslovakia in 1945–46, he claimed that "at least four million of them perished in the process from butchery, starvation and disease". Barnes acknowledged that there were concentration camps in Nazi Germany, but denied there were ever death camps. Barnes said that when "court historians" were forced by "revisionists" to admit there were no death camps, the evidence for gas chambers at the death camps was manufactured.

In response, the German historian Martin Broszat wrote a letter in 1962 clarifying and defining the differences between concentration and death camps. In his letter to the Die Zeit newspaper, Broszat wrote that he wanted to "hammer home, once more, the persistently ignored or denied difference between concentration and extermination camps". In his letter, Broszat claimed this was not an "admission" that there was no Holocaust, but rather an attempt to "set the record straight" about the differences between concentration and death camps. Broszat noted the differences between concentration camps, which were places where the inmates were consistently mistreated, but were not the subject of annihilation, and death camps, which existed solely for the purpose of exterminating their inmates. Broszat denied there was a functioning gas chamber at the Dachau concentration camp (though he noted that one was built shortly before the end of the war as part of the effort to convert Dachau into a death camp, but was never used). Broszat commented that, though there were many concentration camps in Germany, all of the German death camps for the genocide of the European Jews were located in Nazi-occupied Poland. Broszat argued that this confusion in the public's mind between concentration and death camps, and the tendency to erroneously describe Dachau as a death camp, was aiding the early Holocaust deniers like Rassinier, Hoggan, and Barnes, who made much of the fact that there was no functioning gas chamber at Dachau. In the same way, Barnes denied that the Einsatzgruppen murdered millions of Jews in the occupied Soviet Union, and instead claimed that the Einsatzgruppen were "battling guerilla warfare behind the lines".

Barnes often attacked West Germany for apologizing to the Jews for the Holocaust. He wrote that the West German government should challenge the "unfair" verdict and "false dogmas" of World War II, which he claimed prevented "the restoration of Germany to its proper position of unity, power and respect among the nations of the world". Barnes drew unfavorable contrasts between the Weimar Republic, which, he said, had in the 1920s vigorously fought the so-called Kriegsschuldlüge ("war guilt lie") that Germany started World War I, with the "masochistic" behavior of the government of Konrad Adenauer in the 1950s. In 1962, Barnes attacked the West German president Heinrich Lübke for his speech in Israel asking for forgiveness for the German people for the Holocaust. Barnes called the speech "almost incredible grovelling" and "subserviency" to the Jews. Barnes often said that Jews contended that they had been the victims of antisemitism throughout the ages, which he thought was false. Barnes claimed that those who questioned this view were unjustly labeled antisemitic.

Lipstadt's 1993 book Denying the Holocaust devotes chapter 4, "The First Stirrings of Denial in America", to Barnes as the main link between revisionism in the 1920s (re-evaluation of German responsibility for World War I) and the emergence in the 1950s of Holocaust denial (arguing that the Jewish Holocaust either did not happen or was exaggerated by wartime Allied propaganda and postwar Jewish politics). She notes that the German government of the 1920s enthusiastically supported and promoted Barnes' views as exonerating their country, but the postwar West German government accepted national responsibility for the Holocaust, solicited forgiveness, and paid reparations to Jewish survivors. This difference meant that Barnes in his later years had allied himself with American and European antisemites and cranks, rather than with respectable or official opinion. Historian Lucy Dawidowicz concurs.

== Publications ==
=== Books ===
- A History of the Penal, Reformatory and Correctional Institutions of the State of New Jersey. MacCrellish & Quigley Company (1918). 654 pages.
- The League of Nations: The Principle and the Practice. Edited by Stephen Pierce Duggan. Boston: The Atlantic Monthly Press (1919).
- The Social History of the Western World, an Outline Syllabus. New York: D. Appleton (1921).
- Sociology and Political Theory: A Consideration of the Sociological Basis of Politics. New York: A. A. Knopf (1924). 260 pages.
- The History and Prospects of the Social Sciences. New York: A. A. Knopf (1925). 534 pages. Co-written with Karl Worth Bigelow and Jean Brunhes.
- Psychology and History. New York: The Century Company (1925). 192 pages.
- The New History and the Social Studies. New York: The Century Company (1925). 605 pages.
- Ploetz's Epitome of History. New York: Blue Ribbon (1925).
- The Repression of Crime: Studies in Historical Penology. Patterson Smith (1926). 382 pages.
- History and Social Intelligence, New York: A. A. Knopf, 1926. 597 pages.
- The Evolution of Penology in Pennsylvania: A Study in American Social History, Montclair, N.J.: Patterson Smith, 1968, 1927. 414 pages.
- Economic History of Europe, Boston, New York: Houghton Mifflin, 1928. Co-written with Melvin M. Knight and Felix Fluegel.
- Living in the Twentieth Century: A Consideration of How We Go This Way, Indianapolis: Bobbs-Merrill, 1928. 392 pages.
- In Quest of Truth and Justice: Debunking the War Guilt Myth, Chicago: National Historical Society, 1928.
- The Twilight of Christianity, New York: Vanguard Press, 1929.
- The Genesis of the World War: An Introduction to the Problem of War Guilt, New York: A. A. Knopf, 1926. 750 pages.
- The Evolution of Penology in Pennsylvania: A Study in American Social History. Bobbs-Merrill, 1927.
- The Making of a Nation. New York: A. A. Knopf (1929). With Elisabeth A. Dexter and Mabel Walker.
- World Politics in Modern Civilization: The Contributions of Nationalism, Capitalism, Imperialism and Militarism to Human Culture and International Anarchy. New York: A. A. Knopf (1930). OCLC 403525. 608 p.
- The Story of Punishment: A Record of Man's Inhumanity to Man. Stratford, C. (c.1930); 2nd ed. (1972).
- World Politics in Modern Civilization: The Contributions of Nationalism, Capitalism, Imperialism and Militarism to Human Culture and International Anarchy (1930)
- Battling the Crime Wave: Applying Sense and Science to the Repression of Crime. Boston: Stratford (1931).
- Can Man Be Civilized? New York: Brentano's (1932).
- Prohibition Versus Civilization: Analyzing the Dry Psychosis. Viking Press (1932).
- Money Changers vs. the New Deal; a Candid Analysis of the Inflation Controversy. New York: R. Long & R. R. Smith (1934).
- The History of Western Civilization. New York: Harcourt, Brace and Company (1935).
- Famous New Deals of History. New York: W.H. Wise & Co. (1935).
- An Economic History of the Western World. New York: Harcourt Brace (1937).
- An Intellectual and Cultural History of the Western World. New York: Random House (1937, 1941, 1965). Co-authored with Bernard Myers, Walter B. Scott, Edward Hubler and Martin Bernstein.
- A History of Historical Writing. Norman: University of Oklahoma Press (1938); revised ed. New York: Dover Publications (1963).
- Social Thought From Lore to Science (two volumes). Heath (c.1938). 3rd ed.: (three volumes) Dover (1961), with Howard P. Becker et al.
- Social Institutions In an Era of World Upheaval. New York: Prentice-Hall (1942). 927 p.
- New Horizons in Criminology; the American Crime Problem. Co-written with Negley K. Teeters. New York: Prentice-Hall (1943); revised eds. (1959), (1961).
- Pennsylvania Penology: 1944. Pennsylvania Municipal Publications Service (1944).
- A Survey of Western Civilization. Crowell (1947).
- Historical Sociology: Its Origins and Development: Theories of Social Evolution From Cave Life to Atomic Bombing. New York: Philosophical Library (1948).
- Contemporary Social Theory. Co-Edited with Howard Becker and Frances Bennett Becker. New York: Russell & Russell (1971); (1948).
- The American Way of Life: An Introduction to the Study of Contemporary Society, co-authored with Oreen M. Ruedi. New York: Prentice-Hall (1950).
- The Struggle Against the Historical Blackout (1949); 9th ed. (1952). Author of booklets in his field.
- An Introduction to the History of Sociology. Chicago: University of Chicago Press (1917).
- Society in Transition. New York: Greenwood Press (1968).
- Blasting the Historical Blackout in Britain: Professor A. J. P. Taylor's "The Origins of the Second World War": Its Nature, Reliability, Shortcomings and Implications (1963).
- The Future of Imprisonment in a Free Society, co-authored with Nathan F. Leopold Jr., et al. St. Leonard's House (1965).
- Perpetual War for Perpetual Peace: A Critical Examination of the Foreign Policy of Franklin Delano Roosevelt and its Aftermath. New York: Greenwood Press (1969).
- Pearl Harbor after a Quarter of a Century. New York: Arno Press (1972). ISBN 0405004133.
- Selected Revisionist Pamphlets. New York: Arno Press (1972). ISBN 978-0405004155.
- The Chickens of the Interventionist Liberals Have Come Home to Roost: The Bitter Fruits of Globaloney. New York: Revisionist Press (1973). ISBN 0877001944.
- Barnes Against the Blackout: Essays Against Interventionism. Institute for Historical Review (1991). Anthology of Barnes' previous self-published essays on World War II.
- Who Started World War One?, with a preface by Willis A. Carto. Washington, D.C.: The Barnes Review (2009).

=== Articles ===
- "Some Recent Books on International Affairs." Foreign Affairs, vol. 1, no. 1 (Sep. 15, 1922), pp. 168–174. JSTOR 20028206.
- "The Place of Albion Woodbury Small in Modern Sociology." American Journal of Sociology, vol. 32, no. 1 (Jul. 1926) pp. 15–44. JSTOR 2765244.
- "The Public Significance of the War-Guilt Question." Annals of the American Academy of Political and Social Science, vol. 175: The Shadow of War (Sep. 1934) pp. 11–18. JSTOR 1020691.
- "Pearl Harbor After a Quarter of a Century." Left and Right: A Journal of Libertarian Thought, vol. 4, no. 1 (Aug. 8, 2014), pp. 9–132.

=== Contributions ===
- "History, Its Rise and Development: A Survey of the Progress of Historical Writing From its Origins to the Present Day." In: Encyclopedia Americana: The Social History of the Western World (1919).

== See also ==
- Barnes Review
- James J. Martin
- Pierre Renouvin
