= Harry Cullum =

British sports shooter

Personal information
- Born: 29 August 1929 Loddon, Norfolk, England
- Died: 9 August 2004 (aged 74) Dorset, England

Sport
- Sport: Sports shooting

Harry Cullum (29 August 1929 – 9 August 2004) was a British sports shooter. He competed at the 1964 Summer Olympics and the 1972 Summer Olympics.
