= Chick Meehan (basketball) =

American basketball player

Personal information
- Born: January 9, 1917 Syracuse, New York
- Died: April 9, 2004 (aged 87) Kerhonkson, New York
- Listed height: 6 ft 1 in (1.85 m)
- Listed weight: 195 lb (88 kg)

Career information
- High school: Christian Brothers Academy (DeWitt, New York)
- Playing career: 1939–1949
- Position: Guard / forward
- Coaching career: 1950–1972

Career history

Playing
- 1939–1940: Syracuse Reds
- 1940–1943: Newark Elk
- 1943–1944: Rochester Pros
- 1945–1946: Syracuse Stars
- 1946–1948: Syracuse Nationals
- 1948: Mohawk
- 1948–1949: Utica

Coaching
- 1950–1956: Kerhonkson HS
- 1956–1972: Rondout Valley HS

John Dennis "Chick" Meehan (January 9, 1917 – April 9, 2004) was an American professional basketball player. He played for the Syracuse Nationals in the National Basketball League for two seasons and averaged 4.9 points per game. Meehan also played for a number of New York State Professional Basketball League and independent league teams.
