= Hortensia Blanch Pita =

- Born: 1 December 1914; Havana, Cuba
- Died: 21 August 2004 (aged 89); Mexico City, Mexico
- Occupations: writer and film critic
- Writing career
- Pen name: Silvia Mistral

Hortensia Blanch Pita (1 December 1914 – 21 August 2004) was a writer who was born in Cuba and lived in Spain and Mexico. She wrote a noted book about the end of the Spanish Civil War that was published in Mexico. She wrote under the name Silvia Mistral . She had a lifelong interest in film and she died in Mexico.

== Life ==
Blanch was born in Havana on 1 December 1914. Her parents were Catalan and Galician. From 1920 to 1926 the family lived in the area known as Terra Chá in Galicia. After this they returned to Cuba until Spain declared the 2nd Republic and they moved to Barcelona in Catalonia. Blanch's job was in a chemical company but her passion was film. She ended up working for Paramount Pictures and Metro Pictures in Spain. Here she befriended the photographer Kati Horna.

Blanch was writing at the age of 18 for the newspapers Las Noticias and El Día Gráfico. During the Spanish Civil War she continued to write. As the nationalist forces took Catalonia she returned to her place of work at a film distribution company to see Barcelona looking as if it was in flames. The city was not under fire but her company was burning republican films and others were burning employee records, incriminating books and political party membership cards. Several days later they saw locals also burning republican and Catalan flags.

Blanch left Europe for Mexico. Her partner was the anarchist Ricardo Mestre. Her description of being a refugee at the end of the Spanish Civil War was published by the Mexican "Hoy" newspaper and it was later published as the book Éxodo. Diario de una refugiada española in 1940. In Mexico she continued to review films and she also wrote several more books.

Blanch died in Mexico City on 21 August 2004.

== Works ==
- Éxodo, diario de una refugiada española. 1940
- Violetas imperiales
- Madréporas. Ed. Minerva. 1944
- La cola de la sirena (Stories from Mexico for young readers). Ed. Trillas. 24 pp. ISBN 978-968-24-1389-6. 1983
- Mingo, el niño de la banda. Ed. Trillas. 32 pp. ilustró Bruno López. ISBN 978-968-24-1809-9. 1985
- La Cenicienta china. Ed. Trillas. 32 pp. il. ISBN 978-968-24-1837-2. 1986
- La bruja vestida de rosa. Ed. Trillas. 32 pp. ISBN 978-968-24-2546-2. 1988
