= Frederick R. Karl =

Frederick Robert Karl (1927–2004) was a literary biographer, best known for his work on Joseph Conrad, a literary critic, and an editor. He spent 25 years teaching at City College of New York and then followed with 18 years at New York University.

== Biography ==
Karl was born in Brooklyn in 1927. He served in the United States Navy and received his B.A. from Columbia College in 1948. He then earned a master's degree from Stanford University before receiving his Ph.D. from Columbia in 1957. He taught at CCNY from 1957 to 1982 and NYU until 2000, when he retired.

His first work, A Reader's Guide to Great 20th-Century English Novels, discussed writers such as E. M. Forster, D. H. Lawrence, Virginia Woolf and Joseph Conrad. He went on to write extensive biographies about Conrad, William Faulkner, Franz Kafka, and George Eliot. He also edited a multi-volume series, Biography and Source Studies, and co-edited a volume of letters between Conrad and Laurence Davies.

In 1968, he signed the “Writers and Editors War Tax Protest” pledge, vowing to refuse tax payments in protest against the Vietnam War.

Karl received a Guggenheim Fellowship in 1965.

== Books ==
- A Reader's Guide to Great 20th-Century English Novels (1959)
- Joseph Conrad: The Three Lives (Farrar Straus Giroux, 1979)
- American Fictions, 1940-1980: A Comprehensive History & Critical Evaluation (HarperCollins 1983)
- William Faulkner: American Writer (Weidenfeld & Nicolson, 1989)
- Franz Kafka: Representative Man (Ticknor & Fields, 1991)
- George Eliot -- Voice of a Century: A Biography (W. W. Norton, 1995)
- American Fictions: 1980-2000: Whose America Is It Anyway? (Xlibris, 2001)
- A Chronicle of Wasted Time: America in the Seventies (Xlibris, 2002)
- Art Into Life (Etruscan, 2005)
