= Finn Mittet =

Danish footballer (1933-2004)

Personal information
- Date of birth: 24 September 1922
- Place of birth: Copenhagen, Denmark
- Date of death: 21 August 2004 (aged 81)
- Position: Midfielder

International career
Years	Team	Apps	(Gls)
1955	Denmark	2	(0)

Finn Mittet (24 September 1933 – 21 August 2004) was a Danish footballer. He played in two matches for the Denmark national football team in 1955.
