= Billy Richardson (footballer, born 1920) =

Irish footballer

Billy Richardson (4 July 1920 – 9 April 2004) was an Irish soccer player during the 1940s.

Richardson played junior football with Mountpleasant and narrowly missed out on winning an Irish Junior cap in 1939 due to the beginning of World War II. He joined Bohemians in 1942 and played for the "B" team at centre half. He soon made his debut for the first team away to Cork United F.C. and established himself the following season with some great displays at full back (both right and left).

He played in 2 Cup Finals in 1945; losing the FAI Cup Final 1–0 to Shamrock Rovers in front of a record attendance of over 41,000 at Dalymount Park but making up for that defeat by beating Belfast Celtic 3–2 on aggregate in the Inter City Cup Final.

Two seasons later, he was a member of the team that once again reached two Cup Finals; winning the 1946/47 Leinster Senior Cup Final by a record score of 11–0 against Grangegorman but losing the 1947 FAI Cup Final against Cork United. He was made club captain in 1947/48 and capped it by scoring his only ever goal for Bohs with a strike from his own half against Jacobs in the Leinster Senior Cup. At the end of that season, he represented Ireland in the Olympic Games against Holland at Portsmouth.

Richardson died on 9 April 2004.

== Honours ==
- Inter City Cup
  - Bohemians – 1945
- Leinster Senior Cup
  - Bohemians – 1946/47
- Represented Ireland in 1948 Olympic Games
