= Fred Ohlhorn =

German judoka

Fred Olhorn
Personal information
- Born: 22 January 1962
- Died: 26 August 2004 (aged 42)
- Occupation: Judoka

Sport
- Sport: Judo
- Club: SC Dynamo Hoppegarten; Sportvereinigung (SV) Dynamo
Medal record
Men's judo
European Championships
Bronze medal – third place	1990 Rostock	All open

Profile at external databases
- IJF: 62300
- JudoInside.com: 5621

Fred Olhorn (22 January 1962 – 24 August 2004) was a German judoka, who competed for the SC Dynamo Hoppegarten / Sportvereinigung (SV) Dynamo. In 1982, he won the European bronze medal.
