= James J. Martin (historian) =

American revisionist historian (1916–2004)

James Joseph Martin (1916–2004) was an American historian and author known for espousing Holocaust denial in his works. He is known for his book, American Liberalism and World Politics, 1931–1941 (1964). Fellow Holocaust denier Harry Elmer Barnes called it "unquestionably the most formidable achievement of World War II Revisionism."

== Education ==
- University of New Hampshire 1942
- University of Michigan Master's degree in 1945, doctorate in history in 1949

== Teaching ==
After a teaching career at Northern Illinois University, San Francisco State College, and Deep Springs College, he took a job teaching at Robert LeFevre's Rampart College, assuming it would be a full-time job. This was not the case as Rampart College was not yet really a college but only a series of workshop/lectures on libertarian political economy. That led to an eventual falling out between Martin and LeFevre when Rampart College went out of business three years after Martin was hired, with Martin charging LeFevre with a breach of his five-year contract.

== Holocaust denial ==
Martin, a disciple of Holocaust revisionist Harry Elmer Barnes, "lacked his mentor's prestige and reputation but had important contacts in the libertarian right", according to the historian John P. Jackson Jr. In the 1950s and 1960s, Barnes and Martin corresponded about how to "debunk" the number of six million Jews murdered in the Holocaust.

From 1979, Martin began to associate with the Institute for Historical Review (IHR), a Holocaust denial group, writing for the IHR journal, The Journal of Historical Review. Brian Doherty notes in Radicals for Capitalism: "Martin, in his attempt to adjust standard historical understandings of war and war guilt, shifted into questioning the veracity of standard anti-German atrocity stories, including the standard details of the Holocaust", calls it an "unfortunate shading over into Hitler apologetics", and that Martin stated as early as 1976 "I don't believe that the evidence of a planned extermination of the entire Jewish population of Europe is holding up."

== Works ==
=== Books ===
- Men Against the State: The Expositors of Individualist Anarchism in America, 1827–1908. Foreword by Harry Elmer Barnes. Dekalb, Ill.: Adrian Allen Associates (1953). Audiobook.
  - Republished by Ralph Myles (1970), the Ludwig von Mises Institute (2009), and via CreateSpace (2010).
- American Liberalism and World Politics, 1931–1941: Liberalism's Press and Spokesmen on the Road Back to War Between Mukden and Pearl Harbor. (Volumes 1 and 2). Foreword by John Chamberlain. New York: Devin-Adair (1964).
- Revisionist Viewpoints: Essays in a Dissident Historical Tradition. Colorado Springs, Colo.: Ralph Myles (1971).
- Watershed of Empire: Essays on New Deal Foreign Policy, edited with Leonard Liggio. Colorado Springs, Colo.: Ralph Myles (1976).
- The Saga of Hog Island and Other Essays in Inconvenient History. Colorado Springs, Colo.: Ralph Myles (1977).
- Beyond Pearl Harbor: Essays on Some Historical Consequences of the Crisis in the Pacific in 1941. Little Current, ON: Plowshare Press (1981). ISBN 978-0919077027.
- The Man Who Invented 'Genocide': The Public Career and Consequences of Raphael Lemkin. Torrance, Calif.: Institute for Historical Review (1984).
- An American Adventure in Bookburning: In the Style of 1918. Colorado Springs, Colo.: Ralph Myles (1988).

=== Book reviews ===
- Review of National Suicide: Military Aid to the Soviet Union by Antony C. Sutton. Reason, vol. 11, no. 1 (Nov. 1976). Archived from the original.

=== Articles ===
- "A Beginner's Manual for Apprentice Bookburners." Amateur Book Collector, vol. 5, no. 4 (Dec. 1954).
