= 2005 World Wrestling Championships – Women's freestyle 72 kg =

Women's freestyle 72 kg at the 2005 World Championships
- Venue: László Papp Budapest Sports Arena
- Dates: 30 September 2005
- Competitors: 19 from 19 nations

Medalists
gold medal	Iris Smith	United States
silver medal	Kyoko Hamaguchi	Japan
bronze medal	Anita Schätzle	Germany
bronze medal	Svetlana Saenko	Ukraine

The women's freestyle 72 kilograms is a competition featured at the 2005 World Wrestling Championships, and was held at the László Papp Budapest Sports Arena in Budapest, Hungary on 30 September 2005.

This freestyle wrestling competition consists of a single-elimination tournament, with a repechage used to determine the winner of two bronze medals.

== Results ==
Legend

- F — Won by fall

=== Final ===
Final
Iris Smith (USA)	3	1	1
Kyoko Hamaguchi (JPN)	1	1	0

=== Top half ===
Round of 32

Round of 16
Vasilisa Marzaliuk (BLR)	0	0
Anita Schätzle (GER)	1	4
Maria Orlova (UZB)	0
Ohenewa Akuffo (CAN)	6^{F}
Agnieszka Wieszczek (POL)	5	1
Maria Vryoni (GRE)	0	0
Iris Smith (USA)	3	1
Stanka Zlateva (BUL)	1	0

Quarterfinals
Anita Schätzle (GER)	4	2
Ohenewa Akuffo (CAN)	4	0
Agnieszka Wieszczek (POL)	0	0
Iris Smith (USA)	2	6^{F}

Semifinals
Anita Schätzle (GER)	1	0
Iris Smith (USA)	3	2

=== Bottom half ===
Round of 32
Ochirbatyn Burmaa (MGL)	3^{F}
Guzel Manyurova (RUS)	4
Wang Jiao (CHN)	6	6^{F}
Petra Lenkó (HUN)	0	0
Rosângela Conceição (BRA)	0	0
Kyoko Hamaguchi (JPN)	2	2
Olga Zhanibekova (KAZ)	6	6
Jyoti (IND)	0	0

Round of 16
Diana Mudrag (ROM)	6	3	1
Marina Gastl (AUT)	0	5	3^{F}
Maider Unda (ESP)	1	0
Svetlana Saenko (UKR)	0	4^{F}
Ochirbatyn Burmaa (MGL)	0	0
Wang Jiao (CHN)	6	4^{F}
Kyoko Hamaguchi (JPN)	2^{F}
Olga Zhanibekova (KAZ)	0

Quarterfinals
Marina Gastl (AUT)	0	0
Svetlana Saenko (UKR)	1	3
Wang Jiao (CHN)	0	0
Kyoko Hamaguchi (JPN)	9	1

Semifinals
Svetlana Saenko (UKR)	0	0
Kyoko Hamaguchi (JPN)	4	1

=== Repechage ===
Repechage round 1
Rosângela Conceição (BRA)	1	2
Olga Zhanibekova (KAZ)	0	0

Repechage round 2
Stanka Zlateva (BUL)	4^{F}
Agnieszka Wieszczek (POL)	0
Rosângela Conceição (BRA)	5	1
Wang Jiao (CHN)	5	8

Bronze medals
Stanka Zlateva (BUL)	1	2	0
Anita Schätzle (GER)	3	1	4^{F}
Wang Jiao (CHN)	4	0	0
Svetlana Saenko (UKR)	2	2	1
