= 2007 World Wrestling Championships – Women's freestyle 72 kg =

Women's freestyle 72 kg at the 2007 World Championships
- Venue: Heydar Aliyev Sports and Concert Complex
- Dates: 23 September 2007
- Competitors: 31 from 31 nations

Medalists
gold medal	Stanka Zlateva	Bulgaria
silver medal	Kristie Marano	United States
bronze medal	Guzel Manyurova	Russia
bronze medal	Olga Zhanibekova	Kazakhstan

The women's freestyle 72 kilograms is a competition featured at the 2007 World Wrestling Championships, and was held at the Heydar Aliyev Sports and Concert Complex in Baku, Azerbaijan on 23 September 2007.

This freestyle wrestling competition consists of a single-elimination tournament, with a repechage used to determine the winner of two bronze medals.

== Results ==
Legend

- F — Won by fall

=== Final ===
Final
Kristie Marano (USA)	0	0
Stanka Zlateva (BUL)	3	3

=== Top half ===
Round of 32
Maria Vryoni (GRE)	1	0	0
Agnieszka Wieszczek (POL)	0	1	1
Yana Panova (KGZ)	0
Maider Unda (ESP)	6^{F}
Nina Sklenková (CZE)	0	0
Ana Maria Paic (ROU)	3	4^{F}
Soumaya Ben Sassi (TUN)	3^{F}
Iana Zazulina (MDA)	1
Natacha Djédjé (CIV)	0
Guzel Manyurova (RUS)	7^{F}
Svetlana Saenko (UKR)	1	3^{F}
Zumrud Gurbanhajiyeva (AZE)	0	0
Minakshi Devi (IND)	0	0
Jaramit Weffer (VEN)	2	1

Round of 16
Kristie Marano (USA)	3	1
Agnieszka Wieszczek (POL)	0	0
Maider Unda (ESP)	3	2
Ana Maria Paic (ROU)	1	0
Soumaya Ben Sassi (TUN)	0	0
Guzel Manyurova (RUS)	7	6
Svetlana Saenko (UKR)	2	2
Jaramit Weffer (VEN)	0	1

Quarterfinals
Kristie Marano (USA)	1	1	3^{F}
Maider Unda (ESP)	0	6	0
Guzel Manyurova (RUS)	4	6
Svetlana Saenko (UKR)	1	0

Semifinals
Kristie Marano (USA)	3^{F}
Guzel Manyurova (RUS)	0

=== Bottom half ===
Round of 32
Ohenewa Akuffo (CAN)	1	0
Jenny Fransson (SWE)	0	4^{F}
Rita Soós (HUN)	0	0
Rosângela Conceição (BRA)	1	4^{F}
Kae Hyun-ja (KOR)	1	7
Gelegjamtsyn Naranchimeg (MGL)	0	0
Wang Xu (CHN)	3	7
Anita Schätzle (GER)	0	0
Maria Orlova (UZB)	0	0
Marina Gastl (AUT)	6	3
Iryna Tsyrkevich (BLR)	0	2
Olga Zhanibekova (KAZ)	1	2
Annabelle Ali (CMR)	1	0
Kyoko Hamaguchi (JPN)	2	1
Stanka Zlateva (BUL)	2	6^{F}
Shéhérazade Bentorki (FRA)	3	0

Round of 16
Jenny Fransson (SWE)	8	1
Rosângela Conceição (BRA)	1	0
Kae Hyun-ja (KOR)	0	0
Wang Xu (CHN)	1	1
Marina Gastl (AUT)	1	0	0
Olga Zhanibekova (KAZ)	0	2	3
Kyoko Hamaguchi (JPN)	0	1
Stanka Zlateva (BUL)	3	3

Quarterfinals
Jenny Fransson (SWE)	0	3
Wang Xu (CHN)	1	6
Olga Zhanibekova (KAZ)	0	0
Stanka Zlateva (BUL)	4	2

Semifinals
Wang Xu (CHN)	0
Stanka Zlateva (BUL)	4^{F}

=== Repechage ===
Repechage round 1
Shéhérazade Bentorki (FRA)	0	0
Kyoko Hamaguchi (JPN)	5	6

Repechage round 2
Agnieszka Wieszczek (POL)	0	0
Maider Unda (ESP)	4	3^{F}
Kyoko Hamaguchi (JPN)	2	0
Olga Zhanibekova (KAZ)	0	4^{F}

Bronze medals
Maider Unda (ESP)	0
Guzel Manyurova (RUS)	2^{F}
Olga Zhanibekova (KAZ)	2	1
Wang Xu (CHN)	0	0
