= 2006 World Wrestling Championships – Women's freestyle 72 kg =

Women's freestyle 72 kg at the 2006 World Championships
- Venue: Tianhe Gymnasium
- Dates: 1 October 2006
- Competitors: 20 from 20 nations

Medalists
gold medal	Stanka Zlateva	Bulgaria
silver medal	Kyoko Hamaguchi	Japan
bronze medal	Elena Perepelkina	Russia
bronze medal	Kristie Marano	United States

The women's freestyle 72 kilograms is a competition featured at the 2006 World Wrestling Championships, and was held at the Tianhe Gymnasium in Guangzhou, China on 1 October 2006.

This freestyle wrestling competition consists of a single-elimination tournament, with a repechage used to determine the winner of two bronze medals.

== Results ==
Legend

- F — Won by fall
- WO — Won by walkover

=== Final ===
Final
Stanka Zlateva (BUL)	1	2	6
Kyoko Hamaguchi (JPN)	3	1	0

=== Top half ===
Round of 32

Round of 16
Maria Vryoni (GRE)	4^{F}
Sonika Kaliraman (IND)	0
Stanka Zlateva (BUL)	3	0	7
Elena Perepelkina (RUS)	0	3	1
Yana Panova (KGZ)	0	0
Vasilisa Marzaliuk (BLR)	2	1
Wang Jiao (CHN)	6	5
Jaramit Weffer (VEN)	0	1

Quarterfinals
Maria Vryoni (GRE)	0	0
Stanka Zlateva (BUL)	4	3^{F}
Vasilisa Marzaliuk (BLR)	6	1	2
Wang Jiao (CHN)	4	3	2

Semifinals
Stanka Zlateva (BUL)	2	3^{F}
Vasilisa Marzaliuk (BLR)	1	0

=== Bottom half ===
Round of 32
Ana Maria Paic (ROM)	0	0
Jenny Fransson (SWE)	1	4^{F}
Maider Unda (ESP)	0	1
Svetlana Saenko (UKR)	2	2
Darya Karpenko (KAZ)	0	1
Kristie Marano (USA)	3	2
Ochirbatyn Burmaa (MGL)	0	0
Kyoko Hamaguchi (JPN)	7	3^{F}

Round of 16
Anita Schätzle (GER)	0	2
Ohenewa Akuffo (CAN)	2	3
Sandrine Djédjé (CIV)	0	0
Yoon So-young (KOR)	5	6
Jenny Fransson (SWE)	0	0
Svetlana Saenko (UKR)	2	4^{F}
Kristie Marano (USA)	0
Kyoko Hamaguchi (JPN)	7^{F}

Quarterfinals
Ohenewa Akuffo (CAN)	4^{F}
Yoon So-young (KOR)	0
Svetlana Saenko (UKR)	0
Kyoko Hamaguchi (JPN)	6^{F}

Semifinals
Ohenewa Akuffo (CAN)	0	0
Kyoko Hamaguchi (JPN)	1	3

=== Repechage ===
Repechage round 1
Ochirbatyn Burmaa (MGL)	0	1	0
Kristie Marano (USA)	2	0	4^{F}

Repechage round 2
Elena Perepelkina (RUS)	1	4^{F}
Maria Vryoni (GRE)	0	0
Kristie Marano (USA)	W	O
Svetlana Saenko (UKR)

Bronze medals
Elena Perepelkina (RUS)	1	2
Vasilisa Marzaliuk (BLR)	0	0
Kristie Marano (USA)	1	4
Ohenewa Akuffo (CAN)	1	0
