= 2011 World Wrestling Championships – Women's freestyle 72 kg =

Women's freestyle 72 kg at the 2011 World Championships
- Venue: Sinan Erdem Dome
- Dates: 16 September 2011
- Competitors: 31 from 31 nations

Medalists
gold medal	Stanka Zlateva	Bulgaria
silver medal	Ekaterina Bukina	Russia
bronze medal	Ali Bernard	United States
bronze medal	Vasilisa Marzaliuk	Belarus

The women's freestyle 72 kilograms is a competition featured at the 2011 World Wrestling Championships, and was held at the Sinan Erdem Dome in Istanbul, Turkey on 16 September 2011.

This freestyle wrestling competition consists of a single-elimination tournament, with a repechage used to determine the winner of two bronze medals.

== Results ==
Legend

- F — Won by fall

=== Final ===
Final
Stanka Zlateva (BUL)	2	2
Ekaterina Bukina (RUS)	0	1

=== Top half ===
Round of 32
Kyoko Hamaguchi (JPN)	1	2
Jaramit Weffer (VEN)	0	1
Jenny Fransson (SWE)	6	1
Ali Bernard (USA)	7	2
Kateryna Burmistrova (UKR)	3	0
Wang Jiao (CHN)	0	4^{F}
Maja Erlandsen (NOR)	0	2	4^{F}
Maria Vryoni (GRE)	2	0	0
Simge Yılmaz (TUR)	0
Aline Ferreira (BRA)	6^{F}
Stanka Zlateva (BUL)	1	1
Agnieszka Wieszczek (POL)	0	0
Kang Han-bit (KOR)	0	0
Guzel Manyurova (KAZ)	4	4^{F}

Round of 16
Ohenewa Akuffo (CAN)	2	0	1
Kyoko Hamaguchi (JPN)	1	1	0
Ali Bernard (USA)	4	8	5^{F}
Wang Jiao (CHN)	6	7	0
Maja Erlandsen (NOR)	1	2
Aline Ferreira (BRA)	0	1
Stanka Zlateva (BUL)	0	3	4
Guzel Manyurova (KAZ)	1	0	0

Quarterfinals
Ohenewa Akuffo (CAN)	0	1
Ali Bernard (USA)	1	2^{F}
Maja Erlandsen (NOR)	3	0
Stanka Zlateva (BUL)	4	5

Semifinals
Ali Bernard (USA)	1	0
Stanka Zlateva (BUL)	3	2

=== Bottom half ===
Round of 32
Vasilisa Marzaliuk (BLR)	4	2
Marina Gastl (AUT)	0	0
Gursharan Preet Kaur (IND)	0	2
Dina Ivanova (AZE)	3	6
Epp Mäe (EST)	1	2
Lisa Hug (GER)	0	0
Kristīne Odriņa (LAT)	6	0	0
Diana Mudrag (ROU)	1	2	7
Maider Unda (ESP)	0	0
Cynthia Vescan (FRA)	1	1
Yana Panova (KGZ)	3	1	0
Amarachi Obiajunwa (NGR)	2	3	4
Ekaterina Bukina (RUS)	3	1
Annabelle Ali (CMR)	2	0
Gelegjamtsyn Naranchimeg (MGL)	1	1
Kitti Godó (HUN)	0	0

Round of 16
Vasilisa Marzaliuk (BLR)	3^{F}
Dina Ivanova (AZE)	1
Epp Mäe (EST)	1	3^{F}
Diana Mudrag (ROU)	4	0
Cynthia Vescan (FRA)	1	6
Amarachi Obiajunwa (NGR)	0	3
Ekaterina Bukina (RUS)	1	4^{F}
Gelegjamtsyn Naranchimeg (MGL)	1	0

Quarterfinals
Vasilisa Marzaliuk (BLR)	2	3
Epp Mäe (EST)	0	0
Cynthia Vescan (FRA)	0	0
Ekaterina Bukina (RUS)	1	4^{F}

Semifinals
Vasilisa Marzaliuk (BLR)	0	1
Ekaterina Bukina (RUS)	2	3

=== Repechage ===
Repechage round 1
Agnieszka Wieszczek (POL)	0	0
Guzel Manyurova (KAZ)	3	3
Annabelle Ali (CMR)	6	1	2
Gelegjamtsyn Naranchimeg (MGL)	0	1	0

Repechage round 2
Guzel Manyurova (KAZ)	5	4
Maja Erlandsen (NOR)	1	1
Annabelle Ali (CMR)	0	3	3
Cynthia Vescan (FRA)	1	0	0

Bronze medals
Guzel Manyurova (KAZ)	1
Ali Bernard (USA)	3^{F}
Annabelle Ali (CMR)	0	0
Vasilisa Marzaliuk (BLR)	1	1
