= 2009 World Wrestling Championships – Women's freestyle 72 kg =

Women's freestyle 72 kg at the 2009 World Championships
- Venue: Messecenter Herning
- Dates: 25 September 2009
- Competitors: 25 from 25 nations

Medalists
gold medal	Qin Xiaoqing	China
silver medal	Ochirbatyn Burmaa	Mongolia
bronze medal	Maider Unda	Spain
bronze medal	Stanka Zlateva	Bulgaria

The women's freestyle 72 kilograms is a competition featured at the 2009 World Wrestling Championships, and was held at the Messecenter Herning exhibition center in Herning, Denmark on September 25.

This freestyle wrestling competition consists of a single-elimination tournament, with a repechage used to determine the winner of two bronze medals.

== Results ==
Legend

- F — Won by fall

=== Final ===
Final
Ochirbatyn Burmaa (MGL)	0	0
Qin Xiaoqing (CHN)	1	1

=== Top half ===
Round of 32

Round of 16
Ochirbatyn Burmaa (MGL)	2	1
Jenny Fransson (SWE)	0	0
Elena Perepelkina (RUS)	1	2	0
Maider Unda (ESP)	1	0	2
Marina Gastl (AUT)	1	1
Vasilisa Marzaliuk (BLR)	0	0
Osleidy Arteaga (VEN)	0
Simge Yılmaz (TUR)	3^{F}

Quarterfinals
Ochirbatyn Burmaa (MGL)	2	1
Maider Unda (ESP)	0	0
Marina Gastl (AUT)	1	1
Simge Yılmaz (TUR)	0	0

Semifinals
Ochirbatyn Burmaa (MGL)	1	1
Marina Gastl (AUT)	0	0

=== Bottom half ===
Round of 32
Svetlana Saenko (UKR)	7	5
Gursharan Preet Kaur (IND)	0	0
Asuka Sano (JPN)	0	1
Dina Ivanova (AZE)	1	1
Qin Xiaoqing (CHN)	6	7
Bae Mi-kyung (KOR)	0	0
Stanka Zlateva (BUL)	2	3
Ali Bernard (USA)	0	0
Ohenewa Akuffo (CAN)	1	1	1
Maria Vryoni (GRE)	0	1	0

Round of 16
Darya Karpenko (KAZ)	0	2
Annabelle Ali (CMR)	3	4
Yana Panova (KGZ)	0	0
Svetlana Saenko (UKR)	4	5
Dina Ivanova (AZE)	0	0
Qin Xiaoqing (CHN)	1	3
Stanka Zlateva (BUL)	1	1
Ohenewa Akuffo (CAN)	0	1

Quarterfinals
Annabelle Ali (CMR)	0	1	0
Svetlana Saenko (UKR)	1	0	1
Qin Xiaoqing (CHN)	0	1	1
Stanka Zlateva (BUL)	1	0	0

Semifinals
Svetlana Saenko (UKR)	1	0	0
Qin Xiaoqing (CHN)	0	1	1

=== Repechage ===
Repechage round 1
Bae Mi-kyung (KOR)	0	0
Dina Ivanova (AZE)	3	7^{F}

Repechage round 2
Jenny Fransson (SWE)	1	0
Maider Unda (ESP)	1	2
Dina Ivanova (AZE)	5	2	0
Stanka Zlateva (BUL)	2	4	4

Bronze medals
Maider Unda (ESP)	0	1	1
Marina Gastl (AUT)	1	0	0
Stanka Zlateva (BUL)	1	1
Svetlana Saenko (UKR)	0	0
