= 2008 World Wrestling Championships – Women's freestyle 72 kg =

Women's freestyle 72 kg at the 2008 World Championships
- Venue: Yoyogi National Gymnasium
- Dates: 13 October 2008
- Competitors: 15 from 15 nations

Medalists
gold medal	Stanka Zlateva	Bulgaria
silver medal	Hong Yan	China
bronze medal	Kyoko Hamaguchi	Japan
bronze medal	Ohenewa Akuffo	Canada

The women's freestyle 72 kilograms is a competition featured at the 2008 World Wrestling Championships, and was held at the Yoyogi National Gymnasium in Tokyo, Japan on 13 October.

This freestyle wrestling competition consisted of a single-elimination tournament, with a repechage used to determine the winner of two bronze medals. The two finalists faced off for gold and silver medals. Each wrestler who lost to one of the two finalists moved into the repechage, culminating in a pair of bronze medal matches featuring the semifinal losers each facing the remaining repechage opponent from their half of the bracket.

Each bout consisted of up to three rounds, lasting two minutes apiece. The wrestler who scored more points in each round was the winner of that rounds; the bout finished when one wrestler had won two rounds (and thus the match).

== Results ==
Legend

- F — Won by fall
- R — Retired

=== Main bracket ===
Round of 16
Marina Gastl (AUT)	0
Hong Yan (CHN)	6^{F}
Maria Vryoni (GRE)	0	1
Natallia Shynkarova (BLR)	1	1
Stephany Lee (USA)	1	0
Kyoko Hamaguchi (JPN)	0	3^{F}
Alena Starodubtseva (RUS)	1	2
Annabelle Ali (CMR)	0	0
Anmol (IND)	0
Jaramit Weffer (VEN)	4^{F}
Ohenewa Akuffo (CAN)	3	1
Svetlana Saenko (UKR)	0	0
Stanka Zlateva (BUL)	4	5^{F}
Diana Mudrag (ROU)	2	0

Quarterfinals
Ochirbatyn Burmaa (MGL)	0	2	0
Hong Yan (CHN)	6	0	1
Natallia Shynkarova (BLR)	0	1
Kyoko Hamaguchi (JPN)	1	2
Alena Starodubtseva (RUS)	6
Jaramit Weffer (VEN)	0^{R}
Ohenewa Akuffo (CAN)	0	0
Stanka Zlateva (BUL)	1	1

Semifinals
Hong Yan (CHN)	4	1
Kyoko Hamaguchi (JPN)	1	1
Alena Starodubtseva (RUS)	0	0
Stanka Zlateva (BUL)	1	2

Final
Hong Yan (CHN)	1	0
Stanka Zlateva (BUL)	2	4

=== Repechage ===
Repechage round 1
Marina Gastl (AUT)	0	0
Ochirbatyn Burmaa (MGL)	2	3
Diana Mudrag (ROU)	0	0
Ohenewa Akuffo (CAN)	7	1

Bronze medals
Ochirbatyn Burmaa (MGL)	1	0	0
Kyoko Hamaguchi (JPN)	0	1	1
Ohenewa Akuffo (CAN)	1	1
Alena Starodubtseva (RUS)	0	0
