= 2010 World Wrestling Championships – Women's freestyle 72 kg =

Women's freestyle 72 kg at the 2010 World Championships
- Venue: Olympic Stadium
- Dates: 10 September 2010
- Competitors: 20 from 20 nations

Medalists
gold medal	Stanka Zlateva	Bulgaria
silver medal	Ohenewa Akuffo	Canada
bronze medal	Ekaterina Bukina	Russia
bronze medal	Kyoko Hamaguchi	Japan

The women's freestyle 72 kilograms is a competition featured at the 2010 World Wrestling Championships, and was held at the Olympic Stadium in Moscow, Russia on 10 September.

This freestyle wrestling competition consists of a single-elimination tournament, with a repechage used to determine the winner of two bronze medals.

== Results ==
Legend

- F — Won by fall

=== Final ===
Final
Stanka Zlateva (BUL)	1	1
Ohenewa Akuffo (CAN)	0	0

=== Top half ===
Round of 32

Round of 16
Ekaterina Bukina (RUS)	0	2	1
Annabelle Ali (CMR)	3	0	0
Shéhérazade Bentorki (FRA)	0	0
Stanka Zlateva (BUL)	1	2
Roxana Iancolovici (ROU)	3
Stephany Lee (USA)	4^{F}
Vasilisa Marzaliuk (BLR)	0	0
Jenny Fransson (SWE)	3	3

Quarterfinals
Ekaterina Bukina (RUS)	0	0
Stanka Zlateva (BUL)	1	3
Stephany Lee (USA)	0
Jenny Fransson (SWE)	2^{F}

Semifinals
Stanka Zlateva (BUL)	3	1
Jenny Fransson (SWE)	0	1

=== Bottom half ===
Round of 32
Aline Ferreira (BRA)	3	0	0
Li Dan (CHN)	1	3	4^{F}
Kang Han-bit (KOR)	1	0	0
Maria Müller (GER)	0	3	2
Dayanara Rivera (PUR)	2	1
Maider Unda (ESP)	0	8^{F}
Ohenewa Akuffo (CAN)	3	1
Zumrud Gurbanhajiyeva (AZE)	0	0

Round of 16
Ochirbatyn Burmaa (MGL)	2	1
Olga Zhanibekova (KAZ)	0	0
Kateryna Burmistrova (UKR)	1	0	0
Kyoko Hamaguchi (JPN)	1	1	1
Li Dan (CHN)	1	3
Maria Müller (GER)	0	0
Maider Unda (ESP)	0	0
Ohenewa Akuffo (CAN)	1	3^{F}

Quarterfinals
Ochirbatyn Burmaa (MGL)	3	0
Kyoko Hamaguchi (JPN)	4	1
Li Dan (CHN)	0	0
Ohenewa Akuffo (CAN)	4	1

Semifinals
Kyoko Hamaguchi (JPN)	3	0	0
Ohenewa Akuffo (CAN)	0	3	1

=== Repechage ===
Repechage round 1
Zumrud Gurbanhajiyeva (AZE)	0	0
Maider Unda (ESP)	1	3

Repechage round 2
Shéhérazade Bentorki (FRA)	0	0
Ekaterina Bukina (RUS)	1	4
Maider Unda (ESP)	1	1	1
Li Dan (CHN)	0	2	0

Bronze medals
Ekaterina Bukina (RUS)	0	4	1
Jenny Fransson (SWE)	1	3	0
Maider Unda (ESP)	1	0
Kyoko Hamaguchi (JPN)	1	2
