= 2002 World Wrestling Championships – Women's freestyle 72 kg =

Women's freestyle 72 kg at the 2002 World Championships
- Venue: Tasos Kampouris Hall
- Dates: 2–3 November 2002
- Competitors: 21 from 21 nations

Medalists
gold medal	Kyoko Hamaguchi	Japan
silver medal	Wang Xu	China
bronze medal	Edyta Witkowska	Poland

The women's freestyle 72 kilograms is a competition featured at the 2002 World Wrestling Championships, and was held at the Tasos Kampouris Hall in Chalcis, Greece from 2 to 3 November 2002.

== Results ==
Legend

- F — Won by fall

=== Preliminary round ===
==== Pool 1 ====
Pos	Athlete	Pld	W	L	CP	TP	CZE	ITA	SEN
1	Kateřina Halová (CZE)	2	2	0	6	9	—	6–3	3–2
2	Katarzyna Juszczak (ITA)	2	1	1	5	16	1–3 PP	—	13–2
3	Marie Nicole Diédhiou (SEN)	2	0	2	2	4	1–3 PP	1–4 SP	—

Source: Japan Wrestling

==== Pool 2 ====
Pos	Athlete	Pld	W	L	CP	TP	POL	CAN	MGL
1	Edyta Witkowska (POL)	2	2	0	7	13	—	3–0	10–0
2	Pamela Wilson (CAN)	2	1	1	4	11	0–3 PO	—	11–0
3	Tsendkhüügiin Otgontögs (MGL)	2	0	2	0	0	0–4 ST	0–4 ST	—

Source: Japan Wrestling

==== Pool 3 ====
Pos	Athlete	Pld	W	L	CP	TP	BUL	VEN	AUS
1	Galina Ivanova (BUL)	2	2	0	8	7	—	4–0 Fall	3–0 Fall
2	Yasmily Ramos (VEN)	2	1	1	4	9	0–4 TO	—	9–0 Fall
3	Erina Waterreus (AUS)	2	0	2	0	1	0–4 TO	0–4 TO	—

Source: Japan Wrestling

==== Pool 4 ====
Pos	Athlete	Pld	W	L	CP	TP	JPN	RUS	ESP
1	Kyoko Hamaguchi (JPN)	2	2	0	7	14	—	9–0 Fall	5–1
2	Svetlana Martinenko (RUS)	2	1	1	3	3	0–4 TO	—	3–2
3	Maider Unda (ESP)	2	0	2	2	3	1–3 PP	1–3 PP	—

Source: Japan Wrestling

==== Pool 5 ====
Pos	Athlete	Pld	W	L	CP	TP	JPN	USA	KAZ
1	Wang Xu (CHN)	2	2	0	8	12	—	8–3 Fall	4–0 Fall
2	Toccara Montgomery (USA)	2	1	1	4	9	0–4 TO	—	6–0 Fall
3	Gulbanu Abdullina (KAZ)	2	0	2	0	0	0–4 TO	0–4 TO	—

Source: Japan Wrestling

==== Pool 6 ====
Pos	Athlete	Pld	W	L	CP	TP	UKR	GER	KOR
1	Svetlana Saenko (UKR)	2	2	0	6	9	—	3–1	6–3
2	Anita Schätzle (GER)	2	1	1	5	12	1–3 PP	—	11–0
3	Kang Min-jeong (KOR)	2	0	2	1	3	1–3 PP	0–4 ST	—

Source: Japan Wrestling

==== Pool 7 ====
Pos	Athlete	Pld	W	L	CP	TP	TUR	GRE	NOR
1	Zarife Yıldırım (TUR)	2	2	0	6	10	—	4–0	6–0
2	Sofia Kampanari (GRE)	2	1	1	3	3	0–3 PO	—	3–0
3	Nina Nilsen (NOR)	2	0	2	0	0	0–3 PO	0–3 PO	—

Source: Japan Wrestling

=== Knockout round ===
Quarterfinals
Kateřina Halová (CZE)	1
Edyta Witkowska (POL)	7
Galina Ivanova (BUL)	0
Kyoko Hamaguchi (JPN)	10
Wang Xu (CHN)	7
Svetlana Saenko (UKR)	0

Semifinals
Edyta Witkowska (POL)	0
Kyoko Hamaguchi (JPN)	4
Wang Xu (CHN)	5^{F}
Zarife Yıldırım (TUR)	0

Final
Kyoko Hamaguchi (JPN)	5
Wang Xu (CHN)	1
Bronze medal match
Edyta Witkowska (POL)	2
Zarife Yıldırım (TUR)	0
