= 2001 World Wrestling Championships – Women's freestyle 68 kg =

Women's freestyle 68 kg at the 2001 World Championships
- Venue: Winter Sports Palace
- Dates: 22–24 November 2001
- Competitors: 14 from 14 nations

Medalists
gold medal	Christine Nordhagen	Canada
silver medal	Toccara Montgomery	United States
bronze medal	Anita Schätzle	Germany

The women's freestyle 68 kilograms is a competition featured at the 2001 World Wrestling Championships, and was held at the Winter Sports Palace in Sofia, Bulgaria from 22 to 24 November 2001.

== Results ==
Legend

- F — Won by fall

=== Preliminary round ===
==== Pool 1 ====
Pos	Athlete	Pld	W	L	CP	TP	CAN	ESP	VEN
1	Christine Nordhagen (CAN)	2	2	0	6	16	—	10–1	6–3
2	Maider Unda (ESP)	2	1	1	5	4	1–3 PP	—	3–4 Fall
3	Xiomara Guevara (VEN)	2	0	2	1	7	1–3 PP	0–4 TO	—

Source: Official website

==== Pool 2 ====
Pos	Athlete	Pld	W	L	CP	TP	GER	BUL	JPN
1	Anita Schätzle (GER)	2	2	0	7	22	—	14–2	8–2
2	Stanka Zlateva (BUL)	2	1	1	5	7	1–4 SP	—	5–1 Fall
3	Norie Saito (JPN)	2	0	2	1	3	1–3 PP	0–4 TO	—

Source: Official website

==== Pool 3 ====
Pos	Athlete	Pld	W	L	CP	TP	USA	CHN	POL	FIN
1	Toccara Montgomery (USA)	3	3	0	12	30	—	14–4 Fall	9–1 Fall	7–0 Fall
2	Yang Yanli (CHN)	3	2	1	7	22	0–4 TO	—	11–0	7–3
3	Monika Kowalska (POL)	3	1	2	4	11	0–4 TO	0–4 ST	—	10–0
4	Heidi Martti (FIN)	3	0	3	1	3	0–4 TO	1–3 PP	0–4 ST	—

Source: Official website

==== Pool 4 ====
Pos	Athlete	Pld	W	L	CP	TP	RUS	UKR	KGZ	NOR
1	Svetlana Yaroshevich (RUS)	3	3	0	11	15	—	7–4	4–0 Fall	4–0 Fall
2	Kateryna Burmistrova (UKR)	3	2	1	9	19	1–3 PP	—	3–0 Fall	12–0
3	Yana Panova (KGZ)	3	1	2	3	5	0–4 TO	0–4 TO	—	5–2
4	Nina Nilsen (NOR)	3	0	3	1	2	0–4 TO	0–4 ST	1–3 PP	—

Source: Official website

=== Knockout round ===
Semifinals
Christine Nordhagen (CAN)	10
Anita Schätzle (GER)	4
Toccara Montgomery (USA)	7^{F}
Svetlana Yaroshevich (RUS)	2

Final
Christine Nordhagen (CAN)	4
Toccara Montgomery (USA)	1
Bronze medal match
Anita Schätzle (GER)	11
Svetlana Yaroshevich (RUS)	1
