= 2002 World Wrestling Championships – Women's freestyle 67 kg =

Women's freestyle 67 kg at the 2002 World Championships
- Venue: Tasos Kampouris Hall
- Dates: 2–3 November 2002
- Competitors: 15 from 15 nations

Medalists
gold medal	Kateryna Burmistrova	Ukraine
silver medal	Lise Legrand	France
bronze medal	Kristie Marano	United States

The women's freestyle 67 kilograms is a competition featured at the 2002 World Wrestling Championships, and was held at the Tasos Kampouris Hall in Chalcis, Greece from 2 to 3 November 2002.

== Results ==
=== Preliminary round ===
==== Pool 1 ====
Pos	Athlete	Pld	W	L	CP	TP	FRA	JPN	ROM
1	Lise Legrand (FRA)	2	2	0	7	17	—	7–0	10–0 Fall
2	Norie Saito (JPN)	2	1	1	4	10	0–3 PO	—	10–0
3	Geta Buliga (ROM)	2	0	2	0	0	0–4 TO	0–4 ST	—

Source: Japan Wrestling

==== Pool 2 ====
Pos	Athlete	Pld	W	L	CP	TP	GRE	GER	MGL
1	Aikaterini Siavou (GRE)	2	2	0	7	6	—	6–1	WO
2	Annika Oertli (GER)	2	1	1	5	4	1–3 PP	—	3–0 Fall
3	Tsog-Ochiryn Batkhüü (MGL)	2	0	2	0	0	0–4 PA	0–4 TO	—

Source: Japan Wrestling

==== Pool 3 ====
Pos	Athlete	Pld	W	L	CP	TP	POL	IND	CHN
1	Ewelina Pruszko (POL)	2	2	0	8	7	—	7–0 Fall	WO
2	Kiran Sihag (IND)	2	1	1	4	0	0–4 TO	—	WO
3	Zhao Jiajia (CHN)	2	0	2	0	0	0–4 EF	0–4 EF	—

Source: Japan Wrestling

==== Pool 4 ====
Pos	Athlete	Pld	W	L	CP	TP	USA	BUL	CAN
1	Kristie Marano (USA)	2	2	0	7	23	—	6–3	17–5
2	Stanka Zlateva (BUL)	2	1	1	4	11	1–3 PP	—	8–5
3	Shannon Samler (CAN)	2	0	2	2	10	1–4 SP	1–3 PP	—

Source: Japan Wrestling

==== Pool 5 ====
Pos	Athlete	Pld	W	L	CP	TP	UKR	RUS	VEN
1	Kateryna Burmistrova (UKR)	2	1	1	4	8	—	5–3	3–4
2	Elena Perepelkina (RUS)	2	1	1	4	6	1–3 PP	—	3–1
3	Xiomara Guevara (VEN)	2	1	1	4	5	3–1 PP	1–3 PP	—

Source: Japan Wrestling

=== Knockout round ===
Quarterfinals
Lise Legrand (FRA)	13
Aikaterini Siavou (GRE)	3

Semifinals
Lise Legrand (FRA)	3
Ewelina Pruszko (POL)	0
Kristie Marano (USA)	0
Kateryna Burmistrova (UKR)	4

Final
Lise Legrand (FRA)	2
Kateryna Burmistrova (UKR)	3
Bronze medal match
Ewelina Pruszko (POL)	1
Kristie Marano (USA)	6
