= Wrestling at the 2012 Summer Olympics – Women's freestyle 72 kg =

Women's freestyle 72 kg at the Games of the XXX Olympiad
- Venue: ExCeL London
- Date: 9 August 2012
- Competitors: 18 from 18 nations

Medalists
1st place, gold medalist(s)		Natalia Vorobieva	Russia
2nd place, silver medalist(s)		Stanka Zlateva	Bulgaria
3rd place, bronze medalist(s)		Guzel Manyurova	Kazakhstan
3rd place, bronze medalist(s)		Maider Unda	Spain

Women's freestyle 72 kilograms competition at the 2012 Summer Olympics in London, United Kingdom, took place on 9 August at ExCeL London.

This freestyle wrestling competition consists of a single-elimination tournament, with a repechage used to determine the winner of two bronze medals. The two finalists face off for gold and silver medals. Each wrestler who loses to one of the two finalists moves into the repechage, which culminates in a pair of bronze medal matches featuring the semifinal losers each facing the remaining repechage opponent from their half of the bracket.

Each bout consists of up to three rounds, lasting two minutes apiece. The wrestler who scores more points in each round is the winner of that round; the bout ends when one wrestler has won two rounds (and thus the match).

== Schedule ==
All times are British Summer Time (UTC+01:00)

Date	Time	Event
9 August 2012	13:00	Qualification rounds
9 August 2012	17:45	Repechage
9 August 2012	18:45	Finals

== Results ==
Legend

- F — Won by fall

=== Final ===
Final
Natalia Vorobieva (RUS)	0	3^{F}
Stanka Zlateva (BUL)	1	0

=== Top half ===
Qualifications

1/8 finals
Svetlana Saenko (MDA)	0	1	1
Cynthia Vescan (FRA)	1	0	0
Wang Jiao (CHN)	4^{F}
Amarachi Obiajunwa (NGR)	0
Guzel Manyurova (KAZ)	5	1	4
Kyoko Hamaguchi (JPN)	1	1	0
Kateryna Burmistrova (UKR)	0	0
Natalia Vorobieva (RUS)	1	2

1/4 finals
Svetlana Saenko (MDA)	0	0
Wang Jiao (CHN)	1	4^{F}
Guzel Manyurova (KAZ)	3
Natalia Vorobieva (RUS)	4^{F}

Semifinals
Wang Jiao (CHN)	0
Natalia Vorobieva (RUS)	3^{F}

=== Bottom half ===
Qualifications
Vasilisa Marzaliuk (BLR)	0	0
Stanka Zlateva (BUL)	1	1
Ali Bernard (USA)	0	1
Jenny Fransson (SWE)	3	3

1/8 finals
Leah Callahan (CAN)	0	0
Ochirbatyn Burmaa (MGL)	3	5
Ana Talía Betancur (COL)	0	0
Maider Unda (ESP)	2	3
Annabelle Ali (CMR)	4^{F}
Josiane Soloniaina (MAD)	0
Stanka Zlateva (BUL)	1	1
Jenny Fransson (SWE)	0	0

1/4 finals
Ochirbatyn Burmaa (MGL)	1	2	0
Maider Unda (ESP)	1	1	1
Annabelle Ali (CMR)	3	0
Stanka Zlateva (BUL)	3	2

Semifinals
Maider Unda (ESP)	0	0
Stanka Zlateva (BUL)	2	2

=== Repechage ===
Repechage round 1
Vasilisa Marzaliuk (BLR)	2	0	2
Jenny Fransson (SWE)	0	1	0

Repechage round 2
Kateryna Burmistrova (UKR)	0	1
Guzel Manyurova (KAZ)	1	2
Vasilisa Marzaliuk (BLR)	2	1
Annabelle Ali (CMR)	0	0

Bronze medals
Guzel Manyurova (KAZ)	1	4	1
Wang Jiao (CHN)	1	1	0
Vasilisa Marzaliuk (BLR)	0	0
Maider Unda (ESP)	1	1

== Final standing ==
Rank	Athlete
1st place, gold medalist(s)	Natalia Vorobieva (RUS)
2nd place, silver medalist(s)	Stanka Zlateva (BUL)
3rd place, bronze medalist(s)	Guzel Manyurova (KAZ)
3rd place, bronze medalist(s)	Maider Unda (ESP)
5	Wang Jiao (CHN)
5	Vasilisa Marzaliuk (BLR)
7	Annabelle Ali (CMR)
8	Ochirbatyn Burmaa (MGL)
9	Jenny Fransson (SWE)
10	Svetlana Saenko (MDA)
11	Kyoko Hamaguchi (JPN)
12	Cynthia Vescan (FRA)
13	Ali Bernard (USA)
13	Kateryna Burmistrova (UKR)
15	Amarachi Obiajunwa (NGR)
15	Josiane Soloniaina (MAD)
17	Ana Talía Betancur (COL)
18	Leah Callahan (CAN)
