= 1997 World Wrestling Championships – Women's freestyle 75 kg =

Women's freestyle 75 kg at the 1997 World Championships
- Venue: Clermont-Ferrand Sports Hall
- Dates: 10–12 July 1997
- Competitors: 16 from 16 nations

Medalists
gold medal	Kyoko Hamaguchi	Japan
silver medal	Kristie Stenglein	United States
bronze medal	Liu Dongfeng	China

The women's freestyle 75 kilograms is a competition featured at the 1997 World Wrestling Championships, and was at the Clermont-Ferrand Sports Hall held in Clermont-Ferrand, France from 10 to 12 July 1997.

== Results ==
=== Round 1 ===
	Score	
Round of 16
Kyoko Hamaguchi (JPN)	10–0 Fall	Elvira Barriga (AUT)
Elisaveta Toleva (BUL)	4–0	Franziska Lacher (SUI)
Tetyana Komarnytskaya (UKR)	7–3	Nicole Hettich (GER)
Monika Kowalska (POL)	0–6	Liu Dongfeng (CHN)
Ohenewa Akuffo (CAN)	0–11 Fall	Anna Shamova (RUS)
Sha Ling-li (TPE)	4–0 Fall	Mayra Ocampo (VEN)
Vanessa Civit (FRA)	0–4 Fall	Kristie Stenglein (USA)
Saida Riabi (TUN)	4–0 Fall	Romana Hlávková (CZE)

=== Round 2 ===
	Score	
Quarterfinals
Kyoko Hamaguchi (JPN)	4–0 Fall	Elisaveta Toleva (BUL)
Tetyana Komarnytskaya (UKR)	4–11	Liu Dongfeng (CHN)
Anna Shamova (RUS)	6–1	Sha Ling-li (TPE)
Kristie Stenglein (USA)	5–0 Fall	Saida Riabi (TUN)
Repechage
Elvira Barriga (AUT)	11–1	Franziska Lacher (SUI)
Nicole Hettich (GER)	0–3	Monika Kowalska (POL)
Ohenewa Akuffo (CAN)	1–4 Fall	Mayra Ocampo (VEN)
Vanessa Civit (FRA)	11–0	Romana Hlávková (CZE)

=== Round 3 ===
	Score	
Semifinals
Kyoko Hamaguchi (JPN)	8–2 Fall	Liu Dongfeng (CHN)
Anna Shamova (RUS)	7–9	Kristie Stenglein (USA)
Repechage
Elvira Barriga (AUT)	3–1	Monika Kowalska (POL)
Mayra Ocampo (VEN)	2–3	Vanessa Civit (FRA)
Elisaveta Toleva (BUL)	0–3 Fall	Tetyana Komarnytskaya (UKR)
Sha Ling-li (TPE)	10–1	Saida Riabi (TUN)

=== Round 4 ===
	Score	
Repechage
Elvira Barriga (AUT)	6–2 Fall	Vanessa Civit (FRA)
Tetyana Komarnytskaya (UKR)	7–1	Sha Ling-li (TPE)

=== Round 5 ===
	Score	
Repechage
Liu Dongfeng (CHN)	5–0	Elvira Barriga (AUT)
Tetyana Komarnytskaya (UKR)	4–1	Anna Shamova (RUS)

=== Finals ===
	Score	
5th place match
Elvira Barriga (AUT)	0–4 Fall	Anna Shamova (RUS)
Bronze medal match
Liu Dongfeng (CHN)	4–1	Tetyana Komarnytskaya (UKR)
Final
Kyoko Hamaguchi (JPN)	4–0	Kristie Stenglein (USA)
