= Wrestling at the 2015 European Games – Women's freestyle 75 kg =

Women's freestyle 75 kg at the 2015 European Games
- Venue: Heydar Aliyev Arena
- Date: 16 June
- Competitors: 12 from 12 nations

Medalists
gold medal	Vasilisa Marzaliuk	Belarus
silver medal	Ekaterina Bukina	Russia
bronze medal	Maider Unda	Spain
bronze medal	Svetlana Saenko	Moldova

Women's freestyle 75 kg competition at the 2015 European Games in Baku, Azerbaijan, took place on 16 June at the Heydar Aliyev Arena.

== Schedule ==
All times are Azerbaijan Summer Time (UTC+05:00)

Date	Time	Event
Tuesday, 16 June 2015	11:00	1/8 finals
Tuesday, 16 June 2015	13:00	Quarterfinals
Tuesday, 16 June 2015	13:00	Semifinals
Tuesday, 16 June 2015	15:00	Repechage
Tuesday, 16 June 2015	19:00	Finals

== Results ==
Legend

- F — Won by fall

1/8 finals
(Azerbaijan) Gozal Zutova (AZE)	2
(Ukraine) Oksana Vashchuk (UKR)	4
(Turkey) Yasemin Adar (TUR)	6^{F}
(Bulgaria) Stanka Zlateva (BUL)	1
(Russia) Ekaterina Bukina (RUS)	6^{F}
(Poland) Daria Osocka (POL)	5
(Estonia) Epp Mäe (EST)	3
(Moldova) Svetlana Saenko (MDA)	8

Quarterfinals
(Belarus) Vasilisa Marzaliuk (BLR)	8
(Germany) Maria Selmaier (GER)	0
(Spain) Maider Unda (ESP)	5
(Hungary) Zsanett Németh (HUN)	3
(Ukraine) Oksana Vashchuk (UKR)	0
(Turkey) Yasemin Adar (TUR)	4^{F}
(Russia) Ekaterina Bukina (RUS)	9
(Moldova) Svetlana Saenko (MDA)	0

Semifinals
(Belarus) Vasilisa Marzaliuk (BLR)	4
(Spain) Maider Unda (ESP)	4
(Turkey) Yasemin Adar (TUR)	11
(Russia) Ekaterina Bukina (RUS)	14

Final
(Belarus) Vasilisa Marzaliuk (BLR)	5
(Russia) Ekaterina Bukina (RUS)	4

=== Repechage ===
Repechage round 1
(Poland) Daria Osocka (POL)	0
(Moldova) Svetlana Saenko (MDA)	12

Bronze medal match
(Germany) Maria Selmaier (GER)	2
(Spain) Maider Unda (ESP)	5
(Moldova) Svetlana Saenko (MDA)	10
(Turkey) Yasemin Adar (TUR)	3
