= Wrestling at the 2008 Summer Olympics – Women's freestyle 72 kg =

Women's freestyle 72 kg at the Games of the XXIX Olympiad
- Venue: China Agricultural University Gymnasium
- Date: 17 August 2008
- Competitors: 16 from 16 nations

Medalists
1st place, gold medalist(s)		Wang Jiao	China
2nd place, silver medalist(s)		Stanka Zlateva	Bulgaria
3rd place, bronze medalist(s)		Kyoko Hamaguchi	Japan
3rd place, bronze medalist(s)		Agnieszka Wieszczek	Poland

Women's freestyle 72 kilograms competition at the 2008 Summer Olympics in Beijing, China, was held on August 17 at the China Agricultural University Gymnasium.

This freestyle wrestling competition consisted of a single-elimination tournament, with a repechage used to determine the winner of two bronze medals. The two finalists faced off for gold and silver medals. Each wrestler who lost to one of the two finalists moved into the repechage, culminating in a pair of bronze medal matches featuring the semifinal losers each facing the remaining repechage opponent from their half of the bracket.

Each bout consisted of up to three rounds, lasting two minutes apiece. The wrestler who scored more points in each round was the winner of that rounds; the bout finished when one wrestler had won two rounds (and thus the match).

Wang Jiao of China won the gold medal. She defeated Bulgaria's Stanka Zlateva in the final in three periods 0–1, 0–3, 0–4.

The bronze medals went to Japan's Kyoko Hamaguchi and Poland's Agnieszka Wieszczek.

== Schedule ==
All times are China Standard Time (UTC+08:00)

Date	Time	Event
17 August 2008	09:30	Qualification rounds
17 August 2008	16:00	Repechage
17 August 2008	16:30	Finals

== Results ==
Legend

- F — Won by fall

=== Main bracket ===
1/8 finals
Olga Zhanibekova (KAZ)	1	0	0
Rosângela Conceição (BRA)	0	3	4
Elena Perepelkina (RUS)	0	1	0
Kyoko Hamaguchi (JPN)	1	0	1
Ali Bernard (USA)	3^{F}
Amarachi Obiajunwa (NGR)	0
Jenny Fransson (SWE)	3	0
Wang Jiao (CHN)	4	6
Ohenewa Akuffo (CAN)	0	0
Stanka Zlateva (BUL)	2	5^{F}
Oksana Vashchuk (UKR)	0	1
Maider Unda (ESP)	1	3
Agnieszka Wieszczek (POL)	1	6
Annabelle Ali (CMR)	0	0
Anita Schätzle (GER)	2	4^{F}
Audrey Prieto (FRA)	4	0

Quarterfinals
Rosângela Conceição (BRA)	0	0
Kyoko Hamaguchi (JPN)	1	3^{F}
Ali Bernard (USA)	1	3
Wang Jiao (CHN)	3	7
Stanka Zlateva (BUL)	2	6	4
Maider Unda (ESP)	3	0	1
Agnieszka Wieszczek (POL)	1	0	4
Anita Schätzle (GER)	1	2	1

Semifinals
Kyoko Hamaguchi (JPN)	2	0
Wang Jiao (CHN)	5	3^{F}
Stanka Zlateva (BUL)	3	5
Agnieszka Wieszczek (POL)	0	0

Final
Wang Jiao (CHN)	8^{F}
Stanka Zlateva (BUL)	3

=== Repechage ===
Repechage round 1
Jenny Fransson (SWE)	1	0
Ali Bernard (USA)	3	3
Ohenewa Akuffo (CAN)	2	1	0
Maider Unda (ESP)	5	1	1

Bronze medals
Ali Bernard (USA)	0	1
Kyoko Hamaguchi (JPN)	3	3
Maider Unda (ESP)	1	0
Agnieszka Wieszczek (POL)	2	1

== Final standing ==
Rank	Athlete
1st place, gold medalist(s)	Wang Jiao (CHN)
2nd place, silver medalist(s)	Stanka Zlateva (BUL)
3rd place, bronze medalist(s)	Kyoko Hamaguchi (JPN)
3rd place, bronze medalist(s)	Agnieszka Wieszczek (POL)
5	Ali Bernard (USA)
5	Maider Unda (ESP)
7	Anita Schätzle (GER)
8	Rosângela Conceição (BRA)
9	Jenny Fransson (SWE)
10	Ohenewa Akuffo (CAN)
11	Elena Perepelkina (RUS)
12	Oksana Vashchuk (UKR)
13	Olga Zhanibekova (KAZ)
14	Audrey Prieto (FRA)
15	Amarachi Obiajunwa (NGR)
16	Annabelle Ali (CMR)
