= Wrestling at the 2004 Summer Olympics – Women's freestyle 72 kg =

Women's freestyle 72 kg at the Games of the XXVIII Olympiad
- Venue: Ano Liosia Olympic Hall
- Date: 22–23 August 2004
- Competitors: 12 from 12 nations

Medalists
1st place, gold medalist(s)		Wang Xu	China
2nd place, silver medalist(s)		Guzel Manyurova	Russia
3rd place, bronze medalist(s)		Kyoko Hamaguchi	Japan

The women's freestyle 72 kilograms at the 2004 Summer Olympics as part of the wrestling program were held at the Ano Liosia Olympic Hall, August 22 to August 23.

The competition held with an elimination system of three or four wrestlers in each pool, with the winners qualify for the semifinals and final by way of direct elimination.

== Schedule ==
All times are Eastern European Summer Time (UTC+03:00)

Date	Time	Event
22 August 2004	09:30	Round 1
22 August 2004	17:30	Round 2
22 August 2004	17:30	Round 3
23 August 2004	09:30	Semifinals
23 August 2004	17:30	Finals

== Results ==
Legend

- F — Won by fall
- WO — Won by walkover

=== Elimination pools ===
==== Pool 1 ====
Pos	Athlete	Pld	W	L	CP	TP	Qualification
1	Guzel Manyurova (RUS)	2	2	0	7	12	Semifinals
2	Anita Schätzle (GER)	2	1	1	3	5	Classification 5–8
3	Marina Gastl (AUT)	2	0	2	2	2	

Source: Official website

	Score		CP
Marina Gastl (AUT)	1–7	Guzel Manyurova (RUS)	1–3 PP
Anita Schätzle (GER)	4–1	Marina Gastl (AUT)	3–1 PP
Guzel Manyurova (RUS)	5–1 Fall	Anita Schätzle (GER)	4–0 TO

==== Pool 2 ====
Pos	Athlete	Pld	W	L	CP	TP	Qualification
1	Svetlana Saenko (UKR)	2	2	0	7	10	Semifinals
2	Maria Vryoni (GRE)	2	1	1	3	5	Classification 5–8
3	Ochirbatyn Burmaa (MGL)	2	0	2	1	3	

Source: Official website

	Score		CP
Maria Vryoni (GRE)	1–7 Fall	Svetlana Saenko (UKR)	0–4 TO
Ochirbatyn Burmaa (MGL)	3–4	Maria Vryoni (GRE)	1–3 PP
Svetlana Saenko (UKR)	3–0	Ochirbatyn Burmaa (MGL)	3–0 PO

==== Pool 3 ====
Pos	Athlete	Pld	W	L	CP	TP	Qualification
1	Wang Xu (CHN)	2	2	0	6	10	Semifinals
2	Christine Nordhagen (CAN)	2	1	1	4	7	Classification 5–8
3	Katarzyna Juszczak (ITA)	2	0	2	1	2	

Source: Official website

	Score		CP
Wang Xu (CHN)	5–0	Katarzyna Juszczak (ITA)	3–0 PO
Christine Nordhagen (CAN)	2–5	Wang Xu (CHN)	1–3 PP
Katarzyna Juszczak (ITA)	2–5	Christine Nordhagen (CAN)	1–3 PP

==== Pool 4 ====
Pos	Athlete	Pld	W	L	CP	TP	Qualification
1	Kyoko Hamaguchi (JPN)	2	2	0	7	18	Semifinals
2	Toccara Montgomery (USA)	2	1	1	5	8	Classification 5–8
3	Stanka Zlateva (BUL)	2	0	2	0	5	

Source: Official website

	Score		CP
Kyoko Hamaguchi (JPN)	8–4	Toccara Montgomery (USA)	3–1 PP
Stanka Zlateva (BUL)	0–10	Kyoko Hamaguchi (JPN)	0–4 ST
Toccara Montgomery (USA)	4–5 Fall	Stanka Zlateva (BUL)	4–0 TO

=== Classification 5–8 ===
Qualification 5–6		Classification 5–6
Anita Schätzle (GER)	3^{F}
Maria Vryoni (GRE)	0	Anita Schätzle (GER)
Christine Nordhagen (CAN)	8	Christine Nordhagen (CAN)	WO
Toccara Montgomery (USA)	3

=== Final round ===
Semifinals
Guzel Manyurova (RUS)	11^{F}
Svetlana Saenko (UKR)	0
Wang Xu (CHN)	6
Kyoko Hamaguchi (JPN)	4

Gold medal match
Guzel Manyurova (RUS)	2
Wang Xu (CHN)	7
Bronze medal match
Svetlana Saenko (UKR)	0
Kyoko Hamaguchi (JPN)	4

== Final standing ==
Rank	Athlete
1st place, gold medalist(s)	Wang Xu (CHN)
2nd place, silver medalist(s)	Guzel Manyurova (RUS)
3rd place, bronze medalist(s)	Kyoko Hamaguchi (JPN)
4	Svetlana Saenko (UKR)
5	Christine Nordhagen (CAN)
6	Anita Schätzle (GER)
7	Toccara Montgomery (USA)
8	Maria Vryoni (GRE)
9	Marina Gastl (AUT)
10	Ochirbatyn Burmaa (MGL)
11	Katarzyna Juszczak (ITA)
12	Stanka Zlateva (BUL)
