= Wrestling at the 2006 Asian Games – Women's freestyle 72 kg =

Women's freestyle 72 kg at the 2006 Asian Games
- Venue: Aspire Hall 4
- Date: 11 December 2006
- Competitors: 9 from 9 nations

Medalists
gold medal	Wang Xu	China
silver medal	Kyoko Hamaguchi	Japan
bronze medal	Yana Panova	Kyrgyzstan
bronze medal	Ochirbatyn Burmaa	Mongolia

The women's freestyle 72 kilograms wrestling competition at the 2006 Asian Games in Doha was held on 11 December 2006 at the Aspire Hall 4.

This freestyle wrestling competition consisted of a single-elimination tournament, with a repechage used to determine the winner of two bronze medals. The two finalists faced off for gold and silver medals. Each wrestler who lost to one of the two finalists moved into the repechage, culminating in a pair of bronze medal matches featuring the semifinal losers each facing the remaining repechage opponent from their half of the bracket.

Each bout consisted of up to three rounds, lasting two minutes apiece. The wrestler who scored more points in each round was the winner of that rounds; the bout finished when one wrestler had won two rounds (and thus the match).

== Schedule ==
All times are Arabia Standard Time (UTC+03:00)

Date	Time	Event
Monday, 11 December 2006	09:00	Preliminary
Monday, 11 December 2006	09:00	Quarterfinals
Monday, 11 December 2006	09:00	Semifinals
Monday, 11 December 2006	18:00	Finals

== Results ==
Legend

- F — Won by fall

=== Main bracket ===
Preliminary
Ochirbatyn Burmaa (MGL)	3	2
Nasiba Salaýewa (TKM)	0	0

Quarterfinals
Lương Thị Quyên (VIE)	8	0	2
Sonika Kaliraman (IND)	1	3	3
Wang Xu (CHN)	1	8
Yana Panova (KGZ)	0	2
Yoon So-young (KOR)	0
Kyoko Hamaguchi (JPN)	3^{F}
Darya Karpenko (KAZ)	0	0
Ochirbatyn Burmaa (MGL)	1	4

Semifinals
Sonika Kaliraman (IND)	0	0
Wang Xu (CHN)	1	7
Kyoko Hamaguchi (JPN)	2	4^{F}
Ochirbatyn Burmaa (MGL)	0	0

Gold medal match
Wang Xu (CHN)	1	3
Kyoko Hamaguchi (JPN)	0	1

=== Repechage ===
Bronze medal match
Yana Panova (KGZ)	2	1
Sonika Kaliraman (IND)	0	0
Yoon So-young (KOR)	0	0
Ochirbatyn Burmaa (MGL)	3	3

== Final standing ==
Rank	Athlete
1st place, gold medalist(s)	Wang Xu (CHN)
2nd place, silver medalist(s)	Kyoko Hamaguchi (JPN)
3rd place, bronze medalist(s)	Yana Panova (KGZ)
3rd place, bronze medalist(s)	Ochirbatyn Burmaa (MGL)
5	Sonika Kaliraman (IND)
5	Yun So-young (KOR)
7	Lương Thị Quyên (VIE)
8	Darya Karpenko (KAZ)
8	Nasiba Salaýewa (TKM)
