= 2005 World Wrestling Championships – Women's freestyle 67 kg =

Women's freestyle 67 kg at the 2005 World Championships
- Venue: László Papp Budapest Sports Arena
- Dates: 30 September 2005
- Competitors: 19 from 19 nations

Medalists
gold medal	Meng Lili	China
silver medal	Martine Dugrenier	Canada
bronze medal	Elena Perepelkina	Russia
bronze medal	Katie Downing	United States

The women's freestyle 67 kilograms is a competition featured at the 2005 World Wrestling Championships, and was held at the László Papp Budapest Sports Arena in Budapest, Hungary on 30 September 2005.

This freestyle wrestling competition consists of a single-elimination tournament, with a repechage used to determine the winner of two bronze medals.

== Results ==
Legend

- F — Won by fall

=== Final ===
Final
Meng Lili (CHN)	3	2
Martine Dugrenier (CAN)	1	1

=== Top half ===
Round of 32

Round of 16
Hatun Muhçu (TUR)	1	0
Masira Admiraal (NED)	4	2
Meng Lili (CHN)	0	4	1
Elena Perepelkina (RUS)	3	0	0
Yana Panova (KGZ)	1	2
Poonam Bamal (IND)	0	0
Iryna Tsyrkevich (BLR)	0	3
Gelegjamtsyn Naranchimeg (MGL)	1	3

Quarterfinals
Masira Admiraal (NED)	0	0
Meng Lili (CHN)	5	2
Yana Panova (KGZ)	0	1	1
Gelegjamtsyn Naranchimeg (MGL)	1	0	3^{F}

Semifinals
Meng Lili (CHN)	1	4
Gelegjamtsyn Naranchimeg (MGL)	0	0

=== Bottom half ===
Round of 32
Eri Sakamoto (JPN)	5^{F}
Hayat Quassir (MAR)	0
Laura Skujiņa (LAT)	0	3	1
Stavroula Zygouri (GRE)	3	0	4
Manuela Bârzu (ROM)	0
Katie Downing (USA)	3^{F}

Round of 16
Kateryna Burmistrova (UKR)	4	4
Ashlea McManus (GBR)	0	3^{F}
Rita Soós (HUN)	7^{F}
Sana Chortani (TUN)	1
Martine Dugrenier (CAN)	1	4
Eri Sakamoto (JPN)	1	1
Stavroula Zygouri (GRE)	2
Katie Downing (USA)	3^{F}

Quarterfinals
Ashlea McManus (GBR)	0	3	2
Rita Soós (HUN)	1	1	0
Martine Dugrenier (CAN)	1	1
Katie Downing (USA)	0	0

Semifinals
Ashlea McManus (GBR)	0	0
Martine Dugrenier (CAN)	3	6

=== Repechage ===
Repechage round 2
Elena Perepelkina (RUS)	2	4
Masira Admiraal (NED)	0	0
Eri Sakamoto (JPN)	2	0	1
Katie Downing (USA)	0	1	3

Bronze medals
Elena Perepelkina (RUS)	4	5
Gelegjamtsyn Naranchimeg (MGL)	0	0
Katie Downing (USA)	6	7
Ashlea McManus (GBR)	0	0
