= Cameroon at the 2010 Commonwealth Games =

- CGF code: CMR
- CGA: National Olympic and Sports Committee of Cameroon
- Website: cnosc.com (in French)

in Delhi, India
- Competitors: 20
- Flag bearers: Opening: Closing:
- Medals Ranked 24th: Gold 0 Silver 2 Bronze 4 Total 6

Commonwealth Games appearances (overview)
- 1998; 2002; 2006; 2010; 2014; 2018; 2022; 2026; 2030

Cameroon competed in the 2010 Commonwealth Games held in Delhi, India, from 3 to 14 October 2010.

== Medalists ==
Medal	Name	Sport	Event	Date
Silver	Laure Ali Annabel	Wrestling	Women's 72kg	October 7
Silver	Hugo Mamba	Athletics	Men's Triple Jump	October 12
Bronze	Josephe Marie	Weightlifting	Women's 63kg	October 7
Bronze	Hugues Their Onanena	Wrestling	Men's 120kg	October 10
Bronze	Blaise Yepmou	Boxing	Super Heavyweight (Over 91kg)	October 11
Bronze	Bertille Delphine Atangana	Athletics	Women's 100 metres	October 11

== Wrestling ==
Cameroon sent only one participant, Laure Ali Annabel. She won silver medal in the Women's freestyle 72 kg event.

== See also ==
- 2010 Commonwealth Games
