= Wrestling at the 2010 Commonwealth Games – Women's freestyle 72 kg =

Women's freestyle 72 kg competition at the 2010 Commonwealth Games in New Delhi, India, took place on 7 October at the Indira Gandhi Arena.

== Medalists ==
| Gold | Ohenewa Akuffo; Canada |
| Silver | Laure Ali Annabel; Cameroon |
| Bronze | Hellen Okus; Nigeria |

=== Bracket ===
Quarterfinals
Laure Ali Annabel (CMR)
BYE
Sarah Jones (SCO) | 2 | 7 | 0
Sonja Coetzee (RSA) | 0 | 1 | 0
Ohenewa Akuffo (CAN) | 4 | 0 | 0
Cassie Field (AUS) | 3 | 4 | 0
Hellen Okus (NGR) | 1 | 1 | 0
Anshu Tomar (IND) | 0 | 0 | 0

Semifinals
Laure Ali Annabel (CMR) | 4 | 0 | 0
Sarah Jones (SCO) | 0 | 0 | 0
Ohenewa Akuffo (CAN) | 1 | 3 | 0
Hellen Okus (NGR) | 0 | 0 | 0

Finals
Laure Ali Annabel (CMR) | 0 | 3 | 0
Ohenewa Akuffo (CAN) | 3 | 0 | 1

=== Repechage ===
| Quarterfinals | Semifinals | | | | Bronze Medal Bout |
| | BYE |
| | Sarah Jones (SCO) |
| | | | | | Sarah Jones (SCO) | 0 | 0 | 0 |
| | | | | | Hellen Okus (NGR) | 2 | 2 | 0 |
| | Cassie Field (AUS) | 0 | 0 | 0 |
| | Hellen Okus (NGR) | 7 | 0 | 0 |
