= Toccara Montgomery =

American freestyle wrestler

Personal information
- Born: 30 December 1982 (age 43) Cleveland, Ohio, U.S.
- Height: 1.67 m (5 ft 5 1/2 in)
- Weight: 72 kg (159 lb)

Sport
- Style: Freestyle
- Club: Sunkist Kids Wrestling Club
- College team: Cumberlands Patriots
- Coach: Kip Flanik; Joe Corso
Medal record
Women's freestyle wrestling
Representing the United States
World Championships
Silver medal – second place	2001 Sofia	68 kg
Silver medal – second place	2003 New York	72 kg
Pan American Games
Gold medal – first place	2003 Santo Domingo	72 kg

Toccara Montgomery (born December 30, 1982) is a retired amateur American freestyle wrestler, who competed in the women's heavyweight category. She won four U.S. national titles (2001–2004), scored two silver medals in the 68 and 72-kg division at the World Championships (2001 and 2003), and finished seventh at the 2004 Summer Olympics. She finished her wrestling career as one of the most dominant female wrestlers in United States history.

A graduate of University of the Cumberlands, Montgomery has also served as a member of the wrestling squad for the Cumberlands Patriots, and eventually became a graduate assistant coach for three consecutive seasons. Since 2010, Montgomery has been currently working as a full-time head coach for the women's wrestling squad at Lindenwood University in Saint Charles, Missouri.

In 2024, Montgomery was inducted into the National Wrestling Hall of Fame as a Distinguished Member.

== Career ==
=== Early years ===
Montgomery began her sporting career at the age of fifteen, when she checked out a practice for the newly formed wrestling squad at East Technical High School in Cleveland. Despite that the sport had been exclusively competed only by men, Montgomery joined and then trained full-time for the team under her head coach Kip Flanik. During her stellar high school career, she won the 2000 U.S. junior national title under the 68-kg division.

After graduating from high school in 2001, Montgomery attended the University of the Cumberlands in Williamsburg, Kentucky, where she competed for the Cumberlands Patriots wrestling club. During her collegiate career, she helped build the team into one of the top women's wrestling programs in the nation. She compiled a perfect 29–0 dual record, and also claimed the 2004 Women's Collegiate National Championship title in the 158-pound division. In 2006, Montgomery graduated from Cumberlands with a bachelor's degree in education.

=== Freestyle wrestling ===
In 2001, Montgomery joined the U.S. world wrestling team, and eventually earned her first senior berth at the World Championships in Sofia, Bulgaria, where she took home the silver medal in the 68-kg division. On that same year, she became the first ever American to be named the Women's Wrestler of the Year by USA Wrestling because of her outstanding success to the sport in her major international debut.

While competing internationally, Montgomery achieved four U.S. junior and senior national titles (2001–2004), and obtained two Pan American championship trophies in 2002 and 2003. She also captured the gold medal over Canada's Ohenewa Akuffo in the 72-kg division at the 2003 Pan American Games in Santo Domingo, Dominican Republic, and then picked up her second silver at the World Championships in New York City, New York, falling short to Japanese wrestler and four-time defending champion Kyoko Hamaguchi by a 4–1 deficit.

Montgomery qualified for the U.S. women's wrestling squad on her major debut in the women's 72 kg class at the 2004 Summer Olympics in Athens. Earlier in the process, she won a silver medal at the World Championships, and then guaranteed her spot on the U.S. team by overwhelming her rival Kristie Marano from the Olympic Trials. Montgomery suffered another defeat from her longtime rival Hamaguchi in the opening match with a tough 4–8 decision, but wrestled her way to pin Bulgaria's Stanka Zlateva within the halfway mark of the six-minute limit to close the prelim pool. Despite missing a spot on the semifinals, Montgomery seized an opportunity to compete against Canadian wrestler and her former rival Christine Nordhagen in the classification match, but failed to overwhelm her for another time in the mat at 3–8, placing seventh in the final rankings. As she left the Olympic Games empty-handed, Montgomery made an early retirement from competitive wrestling at the age of 21, and instead turned her focus to being part of the coaching staff in Cumberlands.

=== Coaching ===
While attending the University of the Cumberlands, Montgomery helped build a women's wrestling program that had been immediately turned into one of the top sporting ventures in the United States. Because of her enormous contribution to the needs of the nation's college sport programs, she was promoted to a full-time position as a graduate assistant coach for the Cumberlands Patriots wrestling squad upon her early retirement from the sport in 2004. After officially receiving her master's degree in instructional leadership from the Cumberlands in 2009, Montgomery accepted a major offer from Lindenwood University in Saint Charles, Missouri, to serve as the head coach for the Lindenwood Lions, making her the third American woman to do so on the women's college varsity wrestling squad.

=== Honors ===
Montgomery was inducted as a Distinguished Member of the National Wrestling Hall of Fame in 2024

== Personal life ==
Montgomery's parents are Tara and Paul Montgomery. When she was fifteen, her father, Paul pleaded guilty for double murder, and was sentenced to a 30-year to life imprisonment in southwestern Ohio.
