= Vashchuk =

Vashchuk (Ukrainian: Ващук) is a surname. Notable people with the surname include:

- Oksana Vashchuk (born 1989), Ukrainian sport wrestler
- Olha Vashchuk (born 1987), Ukrainian handball player
- Vladyslav Vashchuk (born 1975), Ukrainian footballer
