= Ana Talía Betancur =

Colombian freestyle wrestler

Ana Talía Betancur (born 17 January 1986) is a Colombian female wrestler.

Vescan was born on 17 January 1986 in Medellín, Colombia. At the 2012 Summer Olympics held in London, United Kingdom, she competed in the women's freestyle 72 kg event where she lost her first bout, in the round of 16, against Spain's Maider Unda.
