= 2008 World Wrestling Championships – Women's freestyle 67 kg =

Women's freestyle 67 kg at the 2008 World Championships
- Venue: Yoyogi National Gymnasium
- Dates: 11 October 2008
- Competitors: 17 from 17 nations

Medalists
gold medal	Martine Dugrenier	Canada
silver medal	Mami Shinkai	Japan
bronze medal	Kateryna Burmistrova	Ukraine
bronze medal	Ochirbatyn Nasanburmaa	Mongolia

The women's freestyle 67 kilograms is a competition featured at the 2008 World Wrestling Championships, and was held at the Yoyogi National Gymnasium in Tokyo, Japan on 11 October.

This freestyle wrestling competition consists of a single-elimination tournament, with a repechage used to determine the winner of two bronze medals.

== Results ==
Legend

- F — Won by fall

=== Final ===
Final
Martine Dugrenier (CAN)	4	4
Mami Shinkai (JPN)	0	1

=== Top half ===
Round of 32

Round of 16
Anna Boginskaya (KAZ)	0
Martine Dugrenier (CAN)	7^{F}
Suman Kundu (IND)	2	5
Maria Orlova (UZB)	0	0
Michala Spoustová (CZE)	0	0
Kateryna Burmistrova (UKR)	4	2
Elena Pirozhkova (USA)	3	0	1
Monika Michalik (POL)	0	1	0

Quarterfinals
Martine Dugrenier (CAN)	6	6
Suman Kundu (IND)	0	0
Kateryna Burmistrova (UKR)	3	5
Elena Pirozhkova (USA)	2	0

Semifinals
Martine Dugrenier (CAN)	0	6	2
Kateryna Burmistrova (UKR)	6	0	0

=== Bottom half ===
Round of 32
Yulia Bartnovskaya (RUS)	3	3^{F}
Burcu Örskaya (TUR)	0	0

Round of 16
Lise Legrand (FRA)	1	1
Ochirbatyn Nasanburmaa (MGL)	2	3
Choe Jin-suk (KOR)	0
Zhang Fengliu (CHN)	6^{F}
Mami Shinkai (JPN)	4^{F}
Stephanie Maierhofer (AUT)	0
Volha Khilko (BLR)	0	1
Yulia Bartnovskaya (RUS)	1	2

Quarterfinals
Ochirbatyn Nasanburmaa (MGL)	3^{F}
Zhang Fengliu (CHN)	3
Mami Shinkai (JPN)	1	5
Yulia Bartnovskaya (RUS)	0	0

Semifinals
Ochirbatyn Nasanburmaa (MGL)	1	1
Mami Shinkai (JPN)	1	4^{F}

=== Repechage ===
Repechage round 2
Anna Boginskaya (KAZ)	0	0
Suman Kundu (IND)	2	1
Stephanie Maierhofer (AUT)	0	4	0
Yulia Bartnovskaya (RUS)	6	0	3

Bronze medals
Suman Kundu (IND)	0	0
Kateryna Burmistrova (UKR)	3	2
Yulia Bartnovskaya (RUS)	0	0
Ochirbatyn Nasanburmaa (MGL)	1	2
