= Moldova at the 2012 Summer Olympics =

- IOC code: MDA
- NOC: National Olympic Committee of the Republic of Moldova
- Website: www.olympic.md (in Romanian)

in London
- Competitors: 21 in 9 sports
- Flag bearers: Dan Olaru (opening); Zalina Marghieva (closing)
- Medals: Gold 0 Silver 0 Bronze 0 Total 0

Summer Olympics appearances (overview)
- 1996; 2000; 2004; 2008; 2012; 2016; 2020; 2024

Other related appearances
- Russian Empire (1900–1912); Romania (1924–1936); Soviet Union (1952–1988); Unified Team (1992)

Moldova (officially the Republic of Moldova) competed at the 2012 Summer Olympics in London, from 27 July to 12 August 2012. This was the nation's fifth consecutive appearance at the Summer Olympics in the post-Soviet era.

Moldova sent its smallest delegation to the Games. A total of 22 athletes, 12 men and 10 women, competed in 9 sports. This was also the youngest delegation in Moldova's summer Olympic history, with more than half under the age of 25, and many of them were expected to reach their peak in time for the 2016 Olympics in Rio de Janeiro. Marathon runner Iaroslav Musinschi, who participated as a steeplechaser in the Olympics since 2000, was at his third appearance as the most experienced member. Fourteen Moldovan athletes had competed at their first Olympics, including 15-year-old archer Dan Olaru, the youngest member of the team, who became the nation's flag bearer at the opening ceremony.

Moldova originally left London with two bronze medals, tying its overall record for the most medals with Atlanta and Sydney at a single Olympics. These medals were all won by weightlifters Cristina Iovu and Anatolie Cîrîcu. However, both athletes were disqualified due to positive cases of doping, and Moldova was stripped of both medals and failed to win any medals overall.

== Archery ==
Moldova qualified the following archers.

| Athlete | Event | Ranking round | | Round of 64 | Round of 32 | Round of 16 | Quarterfinals | Semifinals | Final / BM | |
| Athlete | Event | Score | Seed | Opposition Score | Opposition Score | Opposition Score | Opposition Score | Opposition Score | Opposition Score | Rank |
|---|---|---|---|---|---|---|---|---|---|---|
| Dan Olaru | Men's individual | 654 | 47 | Kaminski (USA) (18); W 6–5 | Terry (GBR) (50); W 7–1 | Kim B-m (KOR) (2); L 1–7 | Did not advance | | | |

== Athletics ==
Moldovan athletes achieved qualifying standards in the following athletics events (up to a maximum of 3 athletes in each event at the 'A' Standard, and 1 at the 'B' Standard):

Key

- Note – Ranks given for track events are within the athlete's heat only
- Q = Qualified for the next round
- q = Qualified for the next round as a fastest loser or, in field events, by position without achieving the qualifying target
- NR = National record
- N/A = Round not applicable for the event
- Bye = Athlete not required to compete in round

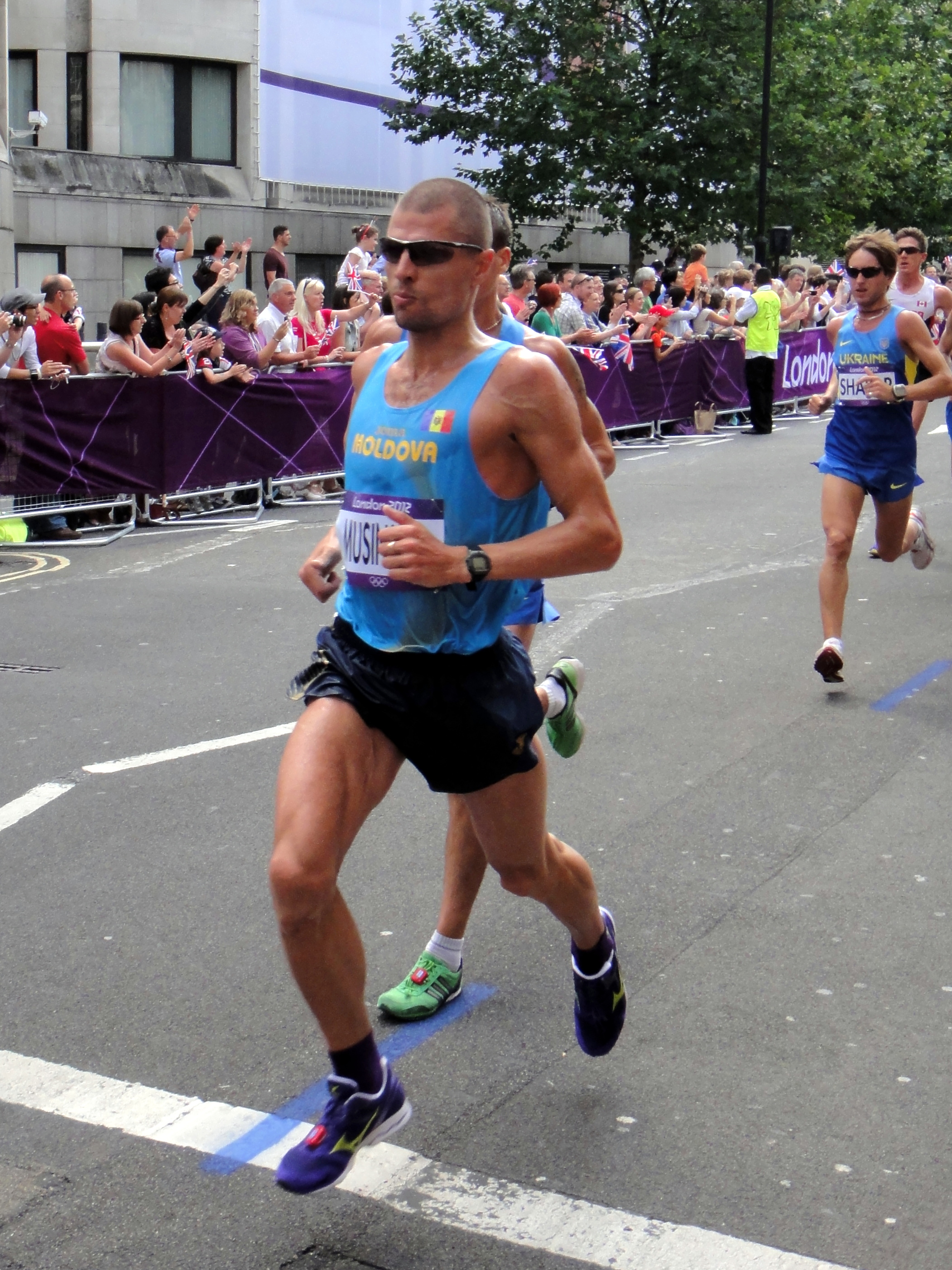
Iaroslav Musinschi finished twenty-fifth in men's marathon.

Men
Track & road events

| Athlete | Event | Heat | | Final | |
| Athlete | Event | Result | Rank | Result | Rank |
|---|---|---|---|---|---|
| Ion Luchianov | 3000 m steeplechase | 8:22.09 | 5 q | 8:28.15 | 10 |
| Iaroslav Musinschi | Marathon | — | | 2:16:25 | 25 |
| Roman Prodius | Marathon | — | | DNF | |

Field events

| Athlete | Event | Qualification | | Final | |
| Athlete | Event | Distance | Position | Distance | Position |
|---|---|---|---|---|---|
| Serghei Marghiev | Hammer throw | 69.76 | 31 | Did not advance | |

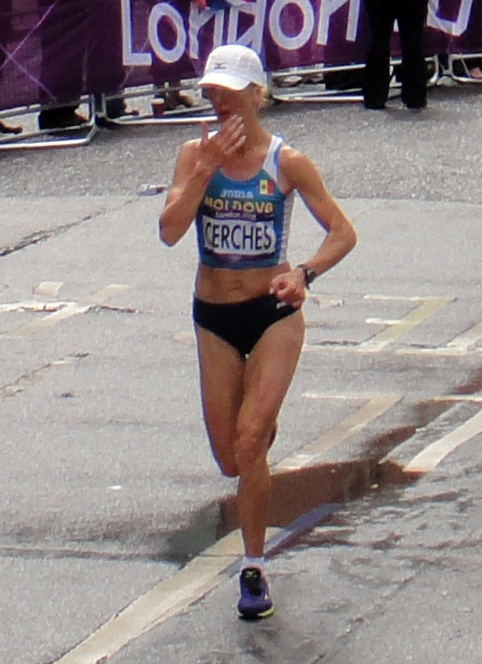
Natalia Cercheș finished sixty-fifth in women's marathon.

Women
Track & road events

| Athlete | Event | Heat | | Semifinal | | Final | |
| Athlete | Event | Result | Rank | Result | Rank | Result | Rank |
|---|---|---|---|---|---|---|---|
| Natalia Cercheș | Marathon | — | | | | 2:37:13 | 65 |
| Olesea Cojuhari | 400 m | 53.64 | 5 | Did not advance | | | |
| Elena Popescu | 800 m | 2:06.94 | 6 | Did not advance | | | |

Field events

| Athlete | Event | Qualification | | Final | |
| Athlete | Event | Distance | Position | Distance | Position |
|---|---|---|---|---|---|
| Marina Marghieva | Hammer throw | Disqualified due to doping | | | |
| Zalina Marghieva | Hammer throw | 72.19 | 9 q | 74.06 | 8 |

== Boxing ==
Moldova has so far qualified boxers for the following events:

Men

| Athlete | Event | Round of 32 | Round of 16 | Quarterfinals | Semifinals | Final | |
| Athlete | Event | Opposition Result | Opposition Result | Opposition Result | Opposition Result | Opposition Result | Rank |
|---|---|---|---|---|---|---|---|
| Vasili Belous | Welterweight | Kidunda (TAN); W 20–7 | Shelestyuk (UKR); L 7–15 | Did not advance | | | |

== Cycling ==
=== Road ===
| Athlete | Event | Time | Rank |
|---|---|---|---|
| Oleg Berdos | Men's road race | Did not finish | |

== Judo ==
Moldova qualified 2 judokas

| Athlete | Event | Round of 32 | Round of 16 | Quarterfinals | Semifinals | Repechage | Final / BM | |
| Athlete | Event | Opposition Result | Opposition Result | Opposition Result | Opposition Result | Opposition Result | Opposition Result | Rank |
|---|---|---|---|---|---|---|---|---|
| Sergiu Toma | Men's −81 kg | Musil (CZE); W 1000–0001 | Nakai (JPN); L 0003–0101 | Did not advance | | | | |
| Ivan Remarenco | Men's −90 kg | Denisov (RUS); L 0001–1000 | Did not advance | | | | | |

== Shooting ==
Women

| Athlete | Event | Qualification | | Final | |
| Athlete | Event | Points | Rank | Points | Rank |
|---|---|---|---|---|---|
| Marina Zgurscaia | 10 m air pistol | 377 | 29 | Did not advance | |

== Swimming ==
Men

| Athlete | Event | Heat | | Semifinal | | Final | |
| Athlete | Event | Time | Rank | Time | Rank | Time | Rank |
|---|---|---|---|---|---|---|---|
| Dănilă Artiomov | 100 m breaststroke | 1:03.57 | 40 | Did not advance | | | |

Women

| Athlete | Event | Heat | | Semifinal | | Final | |
| Athlete | Event | Time | Rank | Time | Rank | Time | Rank |
|---|---|---|---|---|---|---|---|
| Tatiana Chişca | 100 m breaststroke | 1:13.30 | 40 | Did not advance | | | |

== Weightlifting ==
Moldova qualified the following quota places.

| Athlete | Event | Snatch | | Clean & Jerk | | Total | Rank |
| Athlete | Event | Result | Rank | Result | Rank | Total | Rank |
|---|---|---|---|---|---|---|---|
| Anatolie Cîrîcu | Men's −94 kg | ~~181~~ | ~~7~~ | ~~226~~ | ~~2~~ | ~~407~~ | DSQ |
| Cristina Iovu | Women's −53 kg | ~~96~~ | ~~1~~ | ~~120~~ | ~~3~~ | ~~216~~ | DSQ |

== Wrestling ==
Moldova qualified two quotas.

Key

- VT - Victory by Fall.
- PP - Decision by Points - the loser with technical points.
- PO - Decision by Points - the loser without technical points.

Men's freestyle

| Athlete | Event | Qualification | Round of 16 | Quarterfinal | Semifinal | Repechage 1 | Repechage 2 | Final / BM | |
| Athlete | Event | Opposition Result | Opposition Result | Opposition Result | Opposition Result | Opposition Result | Opposition Result | Opposition Result | Rank |
|---|---|---|---|---|---|---|---|---|---|
| Nicolae Ceban | −96 kg | Bye | Boltic (NGR); W 3–1 ^{PP} | Gogshelidze (GEO); L 0–3 ^{PO} | Did not advance | | | | 11 |

Women's freestyle

| Athlete | Event | Qualification | Round of 16 | Quarterfinal | Semifinal | Repechage 1 | Repechage 2 | Final / BM | |
| Athlete | Event | Opposition Result | Opposition Result | Opposition Result | Opposition Result | Opposition Result | Opposition Result | Opposition Result | Rank |
|---|---|---|---|---|---|---|---|---|---|
| Svetlana Saenko | −72 kg | Bye | Vescan (FRA); W 3–1 ^{PP} | Wang J (CHN); L 0–5 ^{VT} | Did not advance | | | | 10 |
