= Ekaterina Bukina =

Russian wrestler (born 1987)

Medal record

Women's freestyle wrestling

Representing Russia

Olympic Games
Bronze medal – third place	2016 Rio de Janeiro	75 kg

Summer Universiade
Gold medal – first place	2013 Kazan	72 kg

World Championships
Silver medal – second place	2011 Istanbul	72 kg
Bronze medal – third place	2010 Moscow	72 kg

European Games
Silver medal – second place	2015 Baku	75 kg

European Championships
Gold medal – first place	2020 Rome	76 kg
Silver medal – second place	2010 Baku	72 kg
Bronze medal – third place	2014 Vantaa	72 kg

Golden Grand Prix Ivan Yarygin
Gold medal – first place	2015 Krasnoyarsk	75 kg
Silver medal – second place	2018 Krasnoyarsk	76 kg

Poland Open
Bronze medal – third place	2014 Dąbrowa Górnicza	72 kg

Ekaterina Borisovna Bukina (Russian: Екатерина Борисовна Букина; born 5 May 1987 in Angarsk) is a wrestler from Russia. She is a silver medalist in wrestling for Women's freestyle in the 75 kilogram range at the 2015 European Games in Baku.

In 2022, she competed in the women's 76 kg event at the Yasar Dogu Tournament held in Istanbul, Turkey.
