= Annabelle Ali =

Cameroonian freestyle wrestler (born 1985)

Annabelle Laure Ali
Personal information
- Born: 4 March 1985 (age 41) Yagoua, Cameroon
Medal record
Women's Freestyle wrestling
Representing Cameroon
Commonwealth Games
Silver medal – second place	2010 Delhi	72 kg
Silver medal – second place	2014 Glasgow	75 kg
African Games
Gold medal – first place	2015 Brazzaville	75 kg

Annabelle Laure Ali (born 4 March 1985) is a female freestyle wrestler from Cameroon. She participated in the Women's Freestyle 72 kg event at the 2008 Summer Olympics, where she lost in the 1/8 final to Agnieszka Wieszczek. At the 2012 Summer Olympics, she lost to Stanka Zlateva in the quarterfinals. As Zlateva proceeded to the final, Ali was part of the bronze medal repechage, where she lost to Vasilisa Marzaliuk. At the 2012 Summer Olympics, she was also the Cameroonian flag-bearer at the opening ceremony.

At the 2014 Commonwealth Games, she won the silver medal in the women's -75 kg division.

== Major results ==
Year	Tournament	Venue	Result	Event
2005	Commonwealth Championships	Stellenbosch, South Africa	1st	72 kg
2007	World Championships	Baku, Azerbaijan	19th	72 kg
2008	African Championships	Tunis, Tunisia	3rd	72 kg
2008	Olympic Games	Beijing, China	16th	72 kg
2008	World Championships	Tokyo, Japan	12th	72 kg
2009	African Championships	Casablanca, Morocco	1st	72 kg
2009	World Championships	Herning, Denmark	9th	72 kg
2010	African Championships	Cairo, Egypt	1st	72 kg
2010	World Championships	Moscow, Russia	11th	72 kg
2010	Commonwealth Games	New Delhi, India	2nd	72 kg
2011	African Championships	Dakar, Senegal	1st	72 kg
2011	World Championships	Istanbul, Turkey	5th	72 kg
2012	African Championships	Marrakesh, Morocco	2nd	72 kg
2012	Olympic Games	(United Kingdom) London, Great Britain	7th	72 kg
2013	Francophone Games	Nice, France	3rd	72 kg
2013	World Championships	Budapest, Hungary	19th	72 kg
2014	African Championships	Tunis, Tunisia	1st	75 kg
2014	Commonwealth Games	(United Kingdom) Glasgow, Great Britain	2nd	75 kg
2015	African Championships	Alexandria, Egypt	1st	75 kg
2015	African Games	(Republic of the Congo) Brazzaville, Congo	1st	75 kg
2016	African Championships	Alexandria, Egypt	2nd	75 kg
2016	Olympic Games	Rio de Janeiro, Brazil	5th	75 kg
2018	African Championships	Port Harcourt, Nigeria	3rd	76 kg

Olympic Games
Preceded by Franck Moussima	Flagbearer for Cameroon; London 2012	Succeeded by Wilfried Ntsengue
