= Maja Erlandsen =

Norwegian freestyle wrestler

Personal information
- Full name: Maja Gunvor Erlandsen
- Born: 11 October 1989 (age 36)
- Height: 169 cm (5 ft 7 in)

Sport
- Country: Norway
- Sport: Amateur wrestling
- Weight class: 72 kg
- Event: Freestyle
Medal record
Women's freestyle wrestling
Representing Norway
European Championships
Gold medal – first place	2012 Belgrade	72 kg

Maja Gunvor Erlandsen (born 11 October 1989) is a Norwegian freestyle wrestler. She won the gold medal in the 72 kg event at the 2012 European Wrestling Championships held in Belgrade, Serbia. In the final she defeated Kateryna Burmistrova of Ukraine. A few months after winning the medal she decided to end her wrestling career and she joined the Norwegian Armed Forces.

== Achievements ==
Year	Tournament	Venue	Result	Event
2012	European Championships	Belgrade, Serbia	1st	Freestyle 72 kg
