= Audrey Prieto =

French freestyle wrestler

Personal information
- Born: 13 June 1980 (age 46) Clermont-Ferrand, France
Medal record
Women's freestyle wrestling
Representing France
World Championships
Gold medal – first place	2007 Baku	59 kg
Mediterranean Games
Bronze medal – third place	2005 Almería	59 kg

Audrey Prieto-Bokhashvili (born 13 June 1980) is a female freestyle wrestler from France. She participated in women's freestyle wrestling 72 kg at 2008 Summer Olympics. Prieto lost in the 1/8 of final to Anita Schätzle.
