= Amarachi Obiajunwa =

Nigerian freestyle wrestler

Amarachi Favour Obiajunwa (born 10 October 1989) is a female freestyle wrestler from Nigeria who has participated at the Olympic Games. (Note: "Amarachi Favour Obiajunwa". London 2012. The London Organising Committee of the Olympic Games and Paralympic Games Limited.)

At the 2008 Summer Olympics she competed in the women's freestyle wrestling 72 kg event. She lost in the 1/8 of final to Ali Bernard from United States. At the 2012 Summer Olympics she again competed in the women's freestyle wrestling 72 kg event, and was defeated in the last 16 by Wang Jiao of China. (Note: "Women's 72kg Freestyle". London 2012. The London Organising Committee of the Olympic Games and Paralympic Games Limited.)
