= Sarah Jones (freestyle wrestler) =

Scottish Freestyle Wrestler

Sarah Jones (born 3 April 1983) is a Scottish freestyle wrestler.

Born in Edinburgh, Scotland, she represented Scotland at the 2010 Commonwealth Games, New Delhi in the 72 kg category placing 4th.

== Achievements ==
| Year | Tournament | Place | Weight class |
|---|---|---|---|
| 2011 | World Freestyle Wrestling Championships | 12th | 67 kg |
| 2010 | Commonwealth Games | 4th | 72 kg |
