= Ali Bernard =

American wrestler (born 1986)

Medal record

Women's freestyle wrestling

Representing United States

World Championships
Bronze medal – third place	2011 Istanbul	72 kg

Ali Bernard (born April 11, 1986 in New Ulm, Minnesota) is a female wrestler, who competes in the women's freestyle heavyweight (72 kg) division.

Wrestling Greco-Roman-style in high school at New Ulm High School, she earned the Minnesota state high school championship in 2004. Bernard received a college scholarship to compete in women's wrestling at the University of Regina in Saskatchewan, Canada, where she won four national college titles.

At the US qualifying for the 2008 Summer Olympics she earned a bye to compete against 2004 bronze medal-winner Katie Downing, whom she defeated in two matches at the 2008 qualifying match in Las Vegas; that feat earned her a spot to compete in the 2008 Summer Olympics in Beijing, China, competing for the United States. She competed in the freestyle 72 kg/158.5 lbs class, because Greco-Roman-style is not yet an Olympic sport for women.

At the 2008 Summer Olympics, Bernard defeated Nigeria's Amarachi Obiajunwa, then lost to China's Wang Jiao which put her in the repechage competition for a bronze medal. In those matches, she defeated Sweden's Jenny Fransson before losing to Japan's Kyoko Hamaguchi, placing fourth in her class.

She won a bronze medal at the 2011 World Championships, beating Fransson, Wang Jiao and Ohenewa Akuffo before losing to Stanka Zlateva. As Zlateva reached the final, Bernard was able to fight for the bronze medal, beating Guzel Manyurova to win it.

Bernard originally lost to Stephany Lee at the 2012 Olympic trials. Lee later tested positive for marijuana and Bernard was awarded the spot. At the 2012 Summer Olympics, she lost to Jenny Fransson in the first round.
