= Iris Smith =

American freestyle wrestler (born 1979)

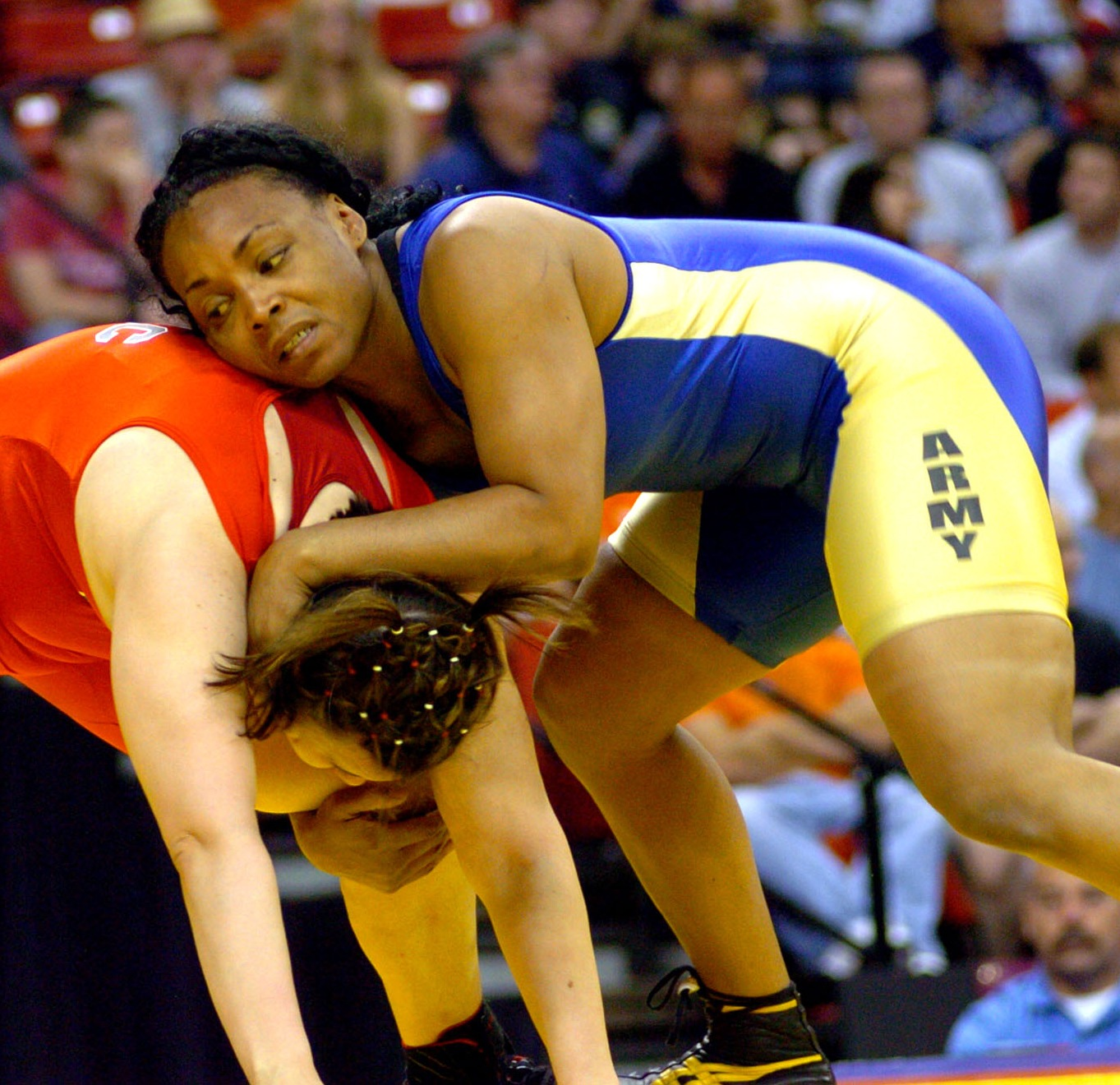
- Iris Smith in 2010

Personal information
- Born: October 15, 1979 (age 46) Albany, Georgia, U.S.
- Height: 5 ft 5 in (1.65 m)
- Weight: 72 kg (159 lb)

Sport
- Country: United States
- Sport: Wrestling
- Event: Freestyle
- Club: U.S. Army WCAP
- Team: USA
- Coached by: Shon Lewis
Medal record
Women's freestyle wrestling
Representing the United States
World Championships
Gold medal – first place	2005 Budapest	72 kg

Iris Smith (born October 15, 1979) is an American freestyle wrestler who won the 2005 women's world title in the 72 kg division. A daughter of Brent James and Betty Smith, she attended Dougherty Comprehensive High School in Albany, Georgia, where she played basketball and served as student council president.

Smith has three brothers, Dominique, Kenderson and Westley, and four sisters, Cheavelia, Tyuana, Nicole, and Sasha. She holds a rank of Staff Sergeant in the U.S. Army. She missed the 2001 World Championships because it overlapped with her military training program.
