= Olga Zhanibekova =

Kazakhstani wrestler (born 1986)

Olga Zhanibekova (born July 15, 1986, in Aktyubinsk, Kazakh SSR) is a female freestyle wrestler from Kazakhstan who participated in women's freestyle wrestling 72 kg at 2008 Summer Olympics. She lost in the 1/8 of final with Rosângela Conceição from Brazil.
