= Stephany Lee =

American wrestler

Stephany Lee is an American wrestler who won the 2012 U.S. Olympic Trials at 72 kg women's freestyle class and was scheduled to compete at the 2012 Summer Olympics before a positive drug test forced her out.

== Life ==
Stephany attended Moanalua High School in Honolulu, Hawaii and Missouri Valley College in Marshall, Missouri.

Stephany defeated Ali Bernard 2 to 0 at the finals of the 2012 U.S. Olympic Trials.

Less than 48 hours after the 2012 U.S. Olympic Trials, Stephany became married.

On June 28, 2012, Lee was stripped of her Olympic spot after she tested positive for marijuana. It was her second positive, the first in 2009. As a result of the sanctions, Lee was forced to retroactively forfeit any honors and medals from 2009. She also earned a one-year suspension. Bernard was named the replacement to represent the United States at the 72 kg class.
