= Oksana Vashchuk =

Ukrainian freestyle wrestler

Oksana Olehivna Vashchuk
Personal information
- Born: 11 February 1989 (age 37) Ivanychi, Ukrainian SSR, Soviet Union

Sport
- Country: Ukraine
- Sport: Freestyle wrestling

Oksana Vashchuk (born 11 February 1989 in Ivanychi, Ukrainian SSR) is a female freestyle wrestler from Ukraine who participated in women's freestyle wrestling 72 kg at 2008 Summer Olympics. She lost in 1/8 final to Maider Unda of Spain.
