= Wang Xu (wrestler) =

Chinese freestyle wrestler

Personal information
- Nationality: Chinese
- Born: September 27, 1985 (age 40) Beijing, China
Medal record
Women's freestyle wrestling
Representing China
Olympic Games
Gold medal – first place	2004 Athens	72 kg

Wang Xu (Chinese: 王旭; pinyin: Wáng Xù; born September 27, 1985, in Beijing) is a female Chinese freestyle wrestler who competed at the 2004 Summer Olympics in Athens, winning a gold medal in the 72 kg weight class.

She was replaced at the 2008 Beijing Olympics by Wang Jiao, who went on to win the gold medal.
