= Elena Perepelkina =

Russian freestyle wrestler (born 1982)

Elena Ivanovna Perepelkina (born January 24, 1982, Pushnoye, Leningrad) is a freestyle wrestler from Russia who participated in women's freestyle wrestling 72 kg at 2008 Summer Olympics. She lost in 1/8 of final with Kyoko Hamaguchi from Japan.
