= Maria Vryoni =

Greek freestyle wrestler

Maria Louiza Vryoni
Personal information
- Full name: Maria Louiza Vryoni
- Nationality: Greece
- Born: 21 October 1982 (age 43) Athens, Greece
- Height: 1.70 m (5 ft 7 in)
- Weight: 72 kg (159 lb)

Sport
- Style: Freestyle
- Club: Atlas Kallitheas
- Coach: Panagiotis Kalaitzidis

Maria Louiza Vryoni (Greek: Μαρία Λουίζα Βρυώνη; born October 21, 1982, in Athens) is an amateur Greek freestyle wrestler, who competed in the women's heavyweight category. She finished fourth in the 72-kg division at the 2013 Mediterranean Games in Mersin, Turkey, and also represented her home nation Greece at the 2004 Summer Olympics in Athens. Vryoni also trained most of her time as a member of Atlas Kallitheas Wrestling Club in Athens, under her coach Panagiotis Kalaitzidis.

Vryoni qualified as a member of the Greek squad in the women's 72 kg, when Greece welcomed the world to the 2004 Summer Olympics in Athens. She filled up an entry by the International Federation of Association Wrestling and the Hellenic Olympic Committee, as Greece received an automatic berth for being the host nation. Amassed the home crowd inside Ano Liossia Olympic Hall, Vryoni was haplessly pinned by Ukraine's Svetlana Saenko in her opening match, but bounced back to defeat Mongolia's Ochirbatyn Burmaa with an arduous 3–4 decision. Despite missing a chance for a medal, Vryoni seized an opportunity to compete against Germany's Anita Schätzle in the classification match, but was easily upset by Schatzle with another fall after fourteen seconds, placing only eighth in the final standings.
