= Marina Gastl =

Austrian wrestler (born 1985)

Personal information
- Full name: Marina Gastl
- Nationality: Austria
- Born: 3 August 1985 (age 40) Innsbruck, Austria
- Height: 1.75 m (5 ft 9 in)
- Weight: 72 kg (159 lb)

Sport
- Style: Freestyle
- Club: RSC Inzing
- Coach: Jörg Helmdach

Marina Gastl (born 3 August 1985 in Innsbruck) is an amateur Austrian freestyle wrestler, who competed in the women's heavyweight category. She represented Austria, as a 19-year-old, at the 2004 Summer Olympics, and later picked up a bronze medal in the 72-kg division at the 2005 World Junior Championships in Vilnius, Lithuania. Throughout her sporting career, Gastl trained full-time for RSC Inzing under her personal coach Jörg Helmdach.

Gastl qualified for the Austrian squad in the women's 72 kg class at the 2004 Summer Olympics in Athens by receiving a berth in and placing first at the Olympic Qualification Tournament in Madrid, Spain. She lost two straight matches each to neighboring Germany's Anita Schätzle (1–4) and the Russian and reigning European champion Guzel Manyurova (1–7) in the prelim pool, ending her chances of advancing further into the semifinals with a ninth-place finish.
