= Rosângela Conceição =

Brazilian wrestling, judo and jiu-jitsu practitioner (born 1973)

- Born: Rosângela da Silva Conceição; 7 August 1973 (age 53); São Leopoldo, Rio Grande do Sul, Brazil
- Other names: Zanza
- Nationality: Brazilian
- Height: 1.72 m (5 ft 8 in)
- Weight: 72 kg (159 lb; 11 st 5 lb)
- Division: Heavyweight
- Team: Barreto Bering
- Rank: Black belt in Brazilian Jiu-Jitsu

Rosângela da Silva Conceição (born 7 August 1973), also known as Zanza, is a former freestyle wrestling, judo, grappling and Brazilian Jiu-Jitsu (BJJ) competitor from Brazil. She was the first Brazilian woman to compete in Olympic wrestling at the 2008 Olympic Games and the first woman to win a BJJ world title.

== Biography ==
Rosângela da Silva Conceição was born on 7 August 1973 in the town of São Leopoldo, Brazil. She started training judo at a young age following in the footsteps of her older brother, looking to improve her ne-waza she started training Brazilian jiu-jitsu (BJJ) with Ricardo Murgel. In 1996 she was selected to act as reserve for Edinanci Silva at the 1996 Summer Olympics. In 1998, while a purple belt, she competed in the very first women division of the CBJJ World Jiu Jitsu Championship. She became alongside Thaís Ramos, the first women BJJ world champion. In 1999 she won the Brazilian National Jiu-Jitsu Championship in both her division (heavy) and in open class.

Competing in freestyle wrestling she won bronze medal at the 2007 Pan American Games, securing a spot later at the 2008 Olympics. She retired in 2013, moved to Dubai, teaching jiu-jitsu as part of the grappling program in the UAE funded by Mohamed bin Zayed.

== Championships and achievements ==
=== Brazilian jiu-jitsu ===
Main Achievements (BJJ):

- World Champion (1998, 2003, 2005)
- Brazilian National Champion (1999 purple: absolute)
- ADCC South American Trials Champion (2009)
- Pan American Champion (1999 WO?)

=== Judo ===
Main Achievements (Judo):

- Reserve Olympian at Atlanta Games (1996)

=== Wrestling ===
Main Achievements (Wrestling):

- Pan American Bronze Medallist (2007)
- Olympian at Beijing Games (2008)
- Edmonton Open 3rd Place (2008)
