= Kristie Marano =

American sport wrestler (born 1979)

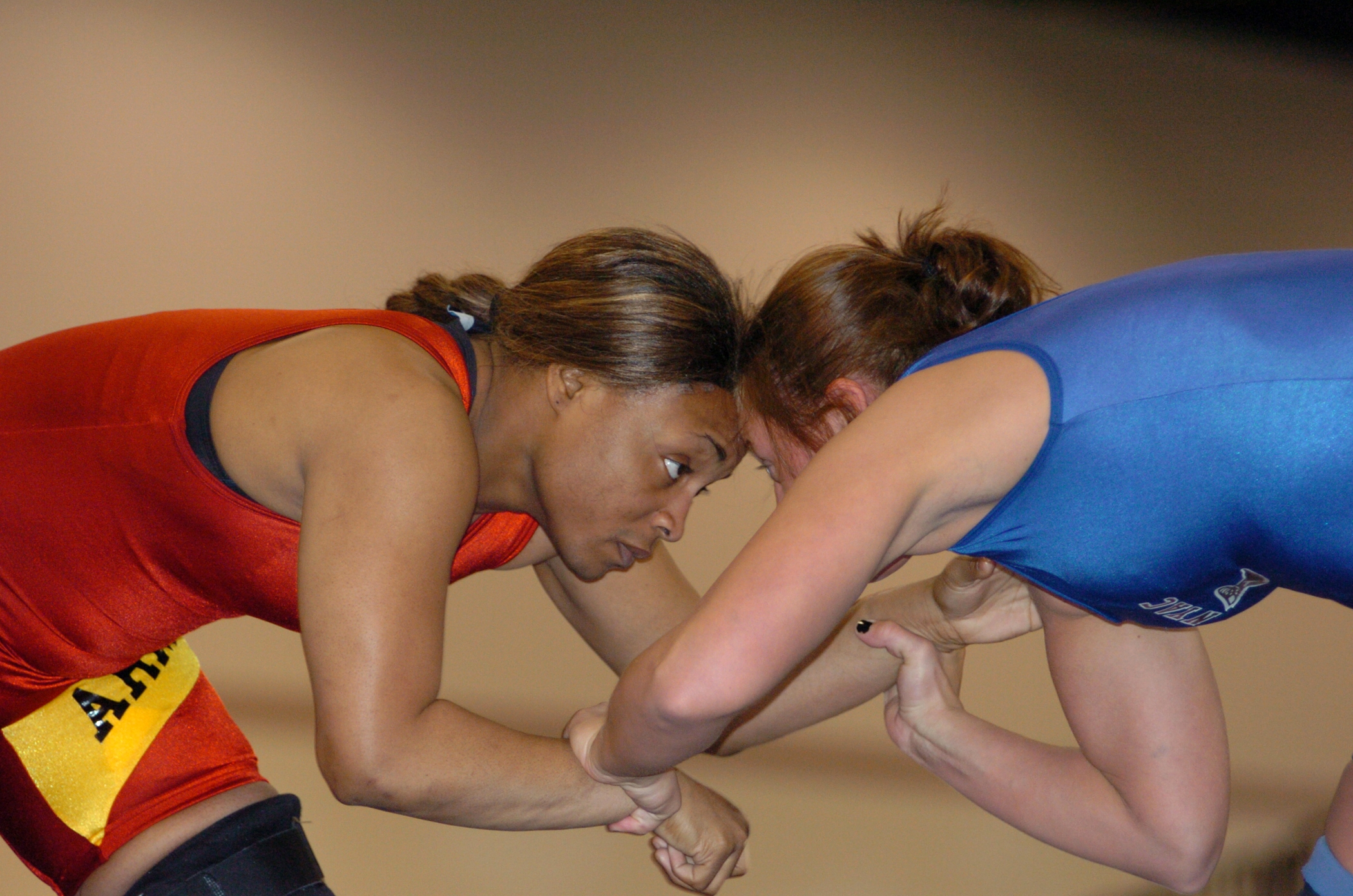
- Army World Class Athlete Program Sgt. Iris Smith (left) wrestles against New York Athletic Club's Kristie Marano (right) in the women's 158.5-pound final of the 2007 U.S. National Wrestling Championships April 6 at Las Vegas Convention Center.

Personal information
- Born: Kristie Stenglein; January 24, 1979 (age 47) Albany, New York, U.S.
- Weight: 75 kg (165 lb)

Sport
- Sport: Wrestling
Medal record
Women's freestyle wrestling
Representing the United States
World Championships
Gold medal – first place	2000 Sofia	68 kg
Gold medal – first place	2003 New York City	67 kg
Silver medal – second place	1996 Sofia	75 kg
Silver medal – second place	1997 Clermont-Ferrand	75 kg
Silver medal – second place	1998 Poznań	75 kg
Silver medal – second place	1999 Boden	75 kg
Silver medal – second place	2007 Baku	72 kg
Bronze medal – third place	2002 Chalcis	67 kg
Bronze medal – third place	2006 Guangzhou	72 kg
Pan American Games
Gold medal – first place	2007 Rio de Janeiro	72 kg

Kristie Davis (née Karen Stenglein, later Kristie Marano, born January 24, 1979) is a wrestler from Albany, New York.

Davis won nine medals at the women's World Championships in freestyle wrestling, two of which were gold. In 2004, Davis (who was competing as Kristie Marano at the time) received the James M. Cooke Memorial Award as the New York Athletic Club's (NYAC) Athlete of the Year. She was the third woman to receive this award.

In 2002, she was awarded Women's Wrestler of the Year by USA Wrestling.

Kristie married Link Davis, the head coach of the Emmanuel College wrestling team, and went by Kristie Davis in 2016. She is an alumna of Colonie Central High School and Hudson Valley Community College and Pikes Peak Community College. She has a daughter named Kayla from her first marriage.

Davis came out of retirement in 2016, in an unsuccessful attempt to make the U.S. Olympic team in the 75 kg class.
