= Ochirbatyn Burmaa =

Mongolian freestyle wrestler (born 1982)

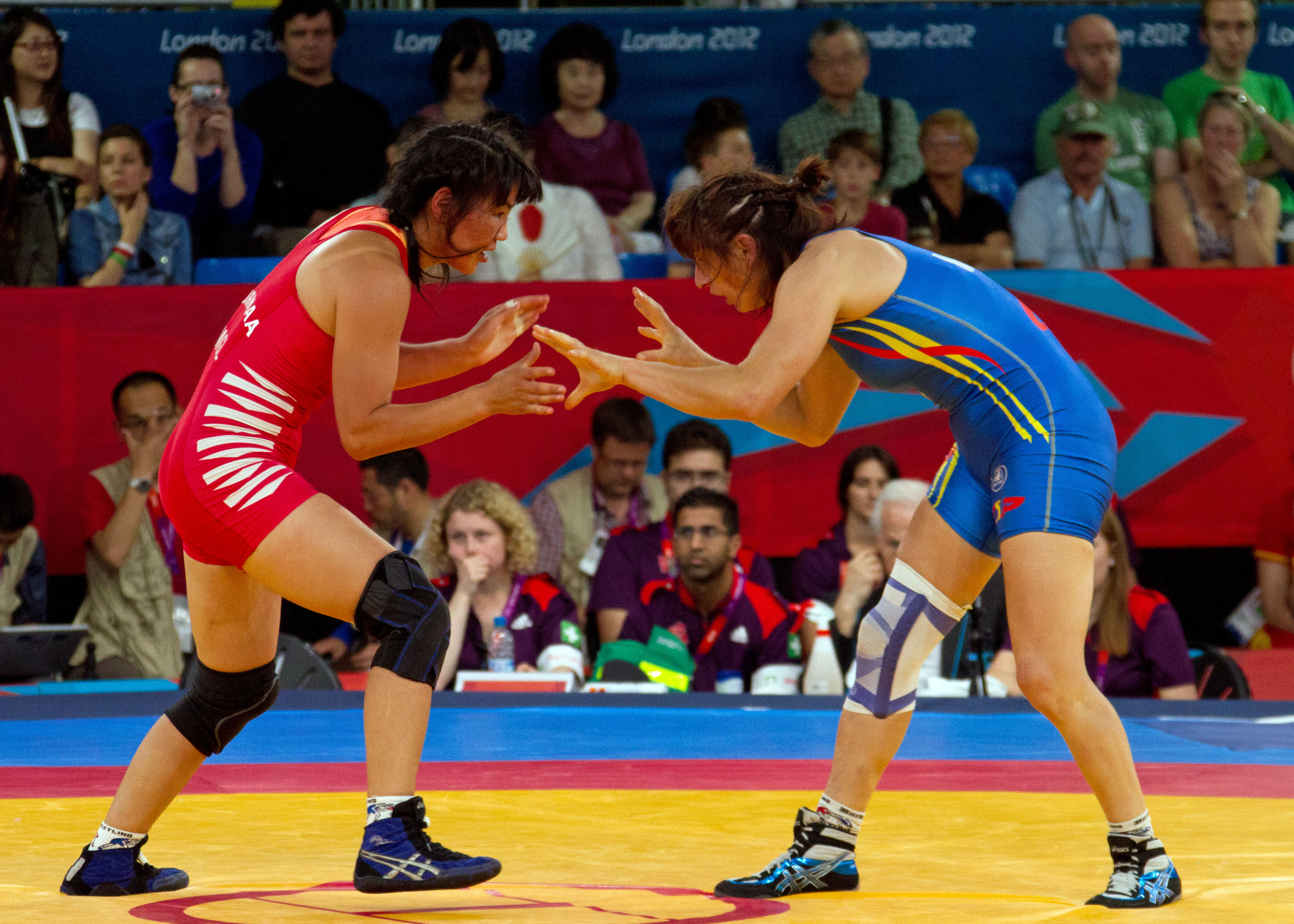
- Maider Unda v Ochirbat Burmaa (left) at the 2012 Olympics

Personal information
- Nationality: (Mongolia) Mongol
- Born: 28 May 1982 (age 44) Ulaanbaatar, Mongolian PR
- Height: 1.76 m (5 ft 9 in)

Sport
- Sport: Wrestling
- Event: Freestyle
Medal record
Women's freestyle wrestling
Representing Mongolia
FILA Wrestling World Championships
Silver medal – second place	2009 Herning, Denmark	72 kg
Bronze medal – third place	2013 Budapest, Hungary	72 kg
Bronze medal – third place	2014 Tashkent, Uzbekistan	75 kg
FILA World Team Championships
Silver medal – second place	2013 Mongolia	72 kg
Asian Games
Bronze medal – third place	2014 Incheon	75 kg
Bronze medal – third place	2006 Doha	72 kg
Asian Wrestling Championships
Gold medal – first place	2016 Bangkok	75 kg
Silver medal – second place	2004 Tokyo	72 kg
Silver medal – second place	2006 Almaty	72 kg
Silver medal – second place	2008 Jeju City	72 kg
Bronze medal – third place	2003 New Delhi	72 kg
Bronze medal – third place	2005 Wuhan	72 kg
Bronze medal – third place	2009 Pattaya	72 kg
Golden Grand Prix Ivan Yarygin
Bronze medal – third place	2016 Krasnoyarsk	75 kg

Ochirbatyn Burmaa (Mongolian: Очирбатын Бурмаа; born 28 May 1982) is a Mongolian freestyle wrestler. She competed in the freestyle 72 kg event at the 2012 Summer Olympics; she defeated Leah Callahan in the 1/8 finals and was eliminated by Maider Unda in the quarterfinals. She also competed in this weight category at the 2004 Summer Olympics, where she finished in 10th place.

She represented Mongolia at the 2020 Summer Olympics held in Tokyo, Japan. She competed in the women's freestyle 76 kg event.
