= Wang Jiao (wrestler) =

Chinese freestyle wrestler

Personal information
- Nationality: Chinese
- Born: January 20, 1988 (age 38) Shenyang, Liaoning, China
Medal record
Women's freestyle wrestling
Representing China
Olympic Games
| Gold medal – first place | 2008 Beijing | 72 kg |

Wang Jiao (simplified Chinese: 王娇; traditional Chinese: 王嬌; pinyin: Wáng Jiāo, born 20 January 1988, Shenyang, Liaoning) is a female Chinese freestyle wrestler who won gold at the 2008 Summer Olympics.

She competed at the 2008 Summer Olympics. She was a late replacement for Xu Wang. She beat Jenny Fransson in the first round, Ali Bernard in the quarter-finals and Kyoko Hamaguchi in the semi-finals before beating Stanka Zlateva in the gold medal match.

She competed again at the 2012 Summer Olympics, but was less successful. She beat Amarachi Obiajunwa in her first match and Svetlana Saenco in the quarterfinals before losing to Nataliya Vorobyova in the semifinals. Because Vorobyova reached the final, Wang entered the repechage, but lost her bronze medal match to Guzel Manyurova.

== See also ==
- China at the 2012 Summer Olympics
