= Jenny Fransson =

Swedish freestyle wrestler

Medal record

Women's freestyle wrestling

Representing Sweden

Olympic Games
| Bronze medal – third place | 2016 Rio de Janeiro | 69 kg |

World Championships
| Gold medal – first place | 2012 Strathcona County | 72 kg |
| Silver medal – second place | 2019 Nur-Sultan | 68 kg |

European Championships
| Gold medal – first place | 2018 Kaspiysk | 72 kg |
| Bronze medal – third place | 2019 Bucharest | 68 kg |
| Bronze medal – third place | 2008 Tampere | 72 kg |

Jenny Fransson (born 18 July 1987 in Karlstad) is a female freestyle wrestler from Sweden who participated in women's freestyle wrestling 72 kg at the 2008, 2012 and 2016 Summer Olympics.

At the 2008 Summer Olympics, in the 1/8 final she lost 1:3 to Wang Jiao, then in the repechage round Fransson lost to Ali Bernard from the United States.

At the 2012 Summer Olympics, she reached the second round, where she lost to Stanka Zlateva. In the repechage, she lost to Vasilisa Marzalyuk.

At the 2016 Summer Olympics, she won a bronze medal, coming through the repechage.

She won a gold medal at the 2018 European Wrestling Championships and a bronze medal at the 2019 and 2008 European Wrestling Championships.

On February 3, 2020, it was announced that Jenny Fransson tested positive in a doping test for the illicit substance methyltestosterone, an anabolic steroid. This led to her being permanently removed from the 2020 Olympic squad, and she was also excluded from the Swedish Olympic Committee's support program Top and Talent.
