= Anita Schätzle =

German wrestler (born 1981)

Medal record

Women's freestyle wrestling

Representing Germany

World Championships
Silver medal – second place	1999	68 kg
Bronze medal – third place	2001	68 kg
Bronze medal – third place	2007	72 kg

World Cup
Silver medal – second place	2007	72 kg

European Championships
Gold medal – first place	2005	72 kg
Bronze medal – third place	2006	72 kg
Bronze medal – third place	2008	72 kg

Anita Schätzle (born 22 September 1981 in Haslach im Kinzigtal) is a German female freestyle wrestler. She participated in women's freestyle wrestling 72 kg at 2008 Summer Olympics. In the 1/8 final she beat French wrestler Audrey Prieto, but she lost in the quarterfinal to Agnieszka Wieszczek.

At women's freestyle 72 kg at 2004 Summer Olympics she finished at 6th place.
