= Maider Unda =

Spanish freestyle wrestler

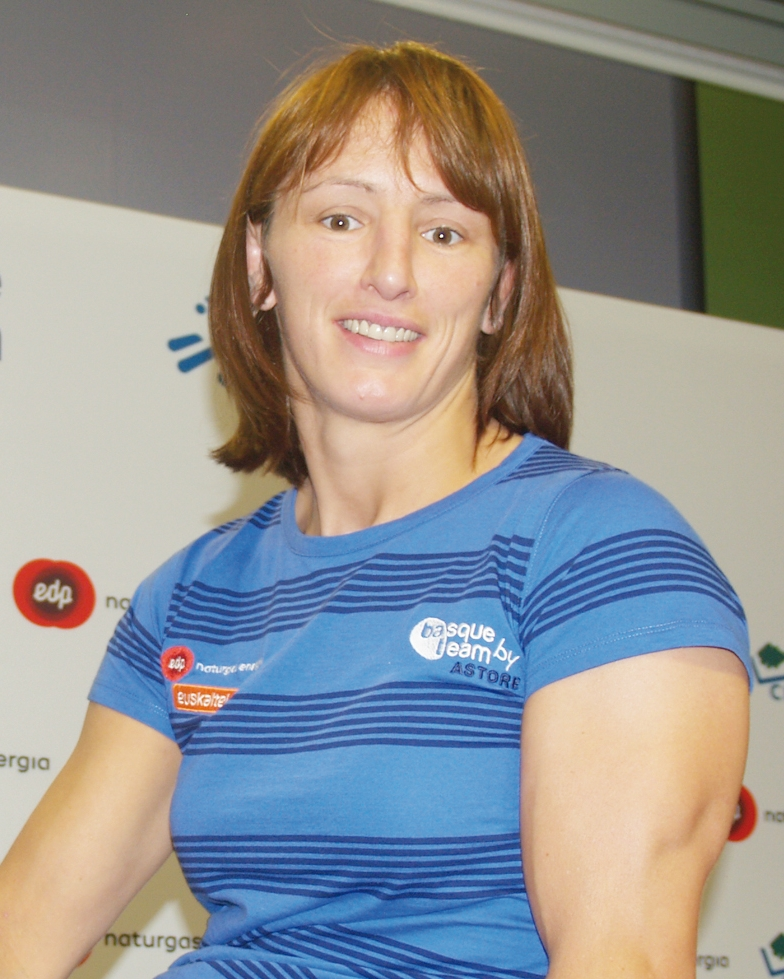
- Maider Unda in 2016

Personal information
- Nationality: Spain
- Born: Maider Unda Gonzalez de Audikana; 2 July 1977 (age 49) Vitoria, Spain
- Height: 1.76 m (5 ft 9 in)
- Weight: 72 kg (159 lb)

Sport
- Sport: Wrestling
- Event: Freestyle
- Retired: 2016
Medal record
Women's freestyle wrestling
Representing Spain
Olympic Games
Bronze medal – third place	2012 London	72 kg
World Championships
Bronze medal – third place	2009 Herning	72 kg
European Games
Bronze medal – third place	2015 Baku	75 kg
European Championships
Silver medal – second place	2013 Tbilisi	72 kg
Bronze medal – third place	2010 Baku	72 kg
Bronze medal – third place	2012 Belgrade	72 kg

Maider Unda Gonzalez de Audikana (born 2 July 1977 in Vitoria, Spain), is a Spanish retired female freestyle wrestler.

She participated in women's freestyle wrestling 72 kg at the 2008 Summer Olympics. In the 1/8 final she beat Oksana Vashchuk (Ukraine). In the quarter-final she lost to Stanka Zlateva (Bulgaria). In the repechage round, after beating Canadian Ohenewa Akuffo she lost to Agnieszka Wieszczek in the bronze medal match.

At the 2012 Summer Olympics, Unda won the bronze medal in women's freestyle wrestling 72 kg. In the 1/8 final she beat Ana Betancur from Colombia, and Ochirbatyn Burmaa from Mongolia in the quarter-final. She lost in the semi-final against Stanka Zlateva but beat Vasilisa Marzaliuk (Belarus) for the bronze medal.

On 9 November 2016, Unda announced her retirement from wrestling after failing to qualify for the 2016 Summer Olympics.

Unda runs a sheep farm in the village of Olaeta in Aramaio producing Idiazabal cheese, which she combined with her career in sports.
