= Agnieszka Wieszczek =

Polish freestyle wrestler

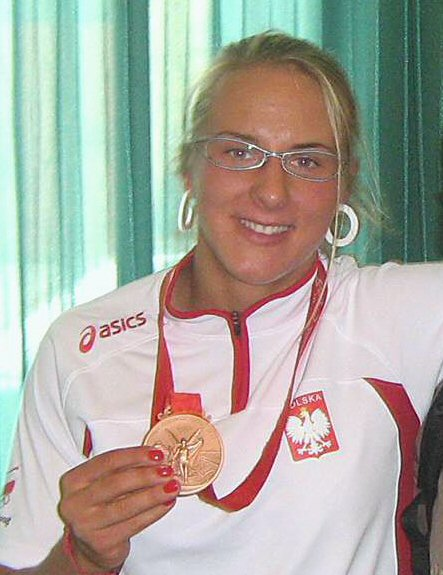
- Wieszczek in 2008

Personal information
- Born: 22 March 1983 (age 43) Wałbrzych, Polish People's Republic
Medal record
Women's freestyle wrestling
Representing Poland
Olympic Games
Bronze medal – third place	2008 Beijing	72 kg
European Championships
Bronze medal – third place	2006 Moskov	67 kg
Bronze medal – third place	2007 Sofia	72 kg
Bronze medal – third place	2009 Vilnius	72 kg
Bronze medal – third place	2011 Dortmund	72 kg

Agnieszka Jadwiga Wieszczek-Kordus (born 22 March 1983 in Wałbrzych) is a Polish freestyle wrestler. Wieszczek won a bronze medal in women's freestyle wrestling 72 kg at the 2008 Summer Olympics.

She is the first Polish woman to win an Olympic medal in women's freestyle wrestling.

In March 2021, she competed at the European Qualification Tournament in Budapest, Hungary hoping to qualify for the 2020 Summer Olympics in Tokyo, Japan.

For her sport achievements, she received:
Golden Cross of Merit in 2008.
