= Kateryna Burmistrova =

Ukrainian freestyle wrestler

Medal record

Women's freestyle wrestling

Representing Ukraine

World Championships
Gold medal – first place	2002 Chalcis	67 kg
Bronze medal – third place	2008 Tokyo	67 kg

European Championships
Gold medal – first place	2009 Vilnius	67 kg
Gold medal – first place	2011 Dortmund	72 kg
Silver medal – second place	2010 Baku	67 kg
Silver medal – second place	2012 Belgrad	72 kg
Bronze medal – third place	2013 Tbilisi	72 kg
Bronze medal – third place	2014 Vantaa	75 kg

Summer Universiade
Silver medal – second place	2005 İzmir	72 kg

Kateryna Burmistrova (Ukrainian: Катерина Володимирівна Бурмістрова, sometimes written as Burmystrova, born 20 November 1979) is a Ukrainian wrestler.

Burmistrova was born on 20 November 1979 in Sumy, Ukraine. At the 2012 Summer Olympics held in London, United Kingdom, she competed in the women's freestyle 72 kg event where she lost her first bout, in the round of 16, against Russia's Natalia Vorobieva.
