= Svetlana Saenko =

Moldovan freestyle wrestler

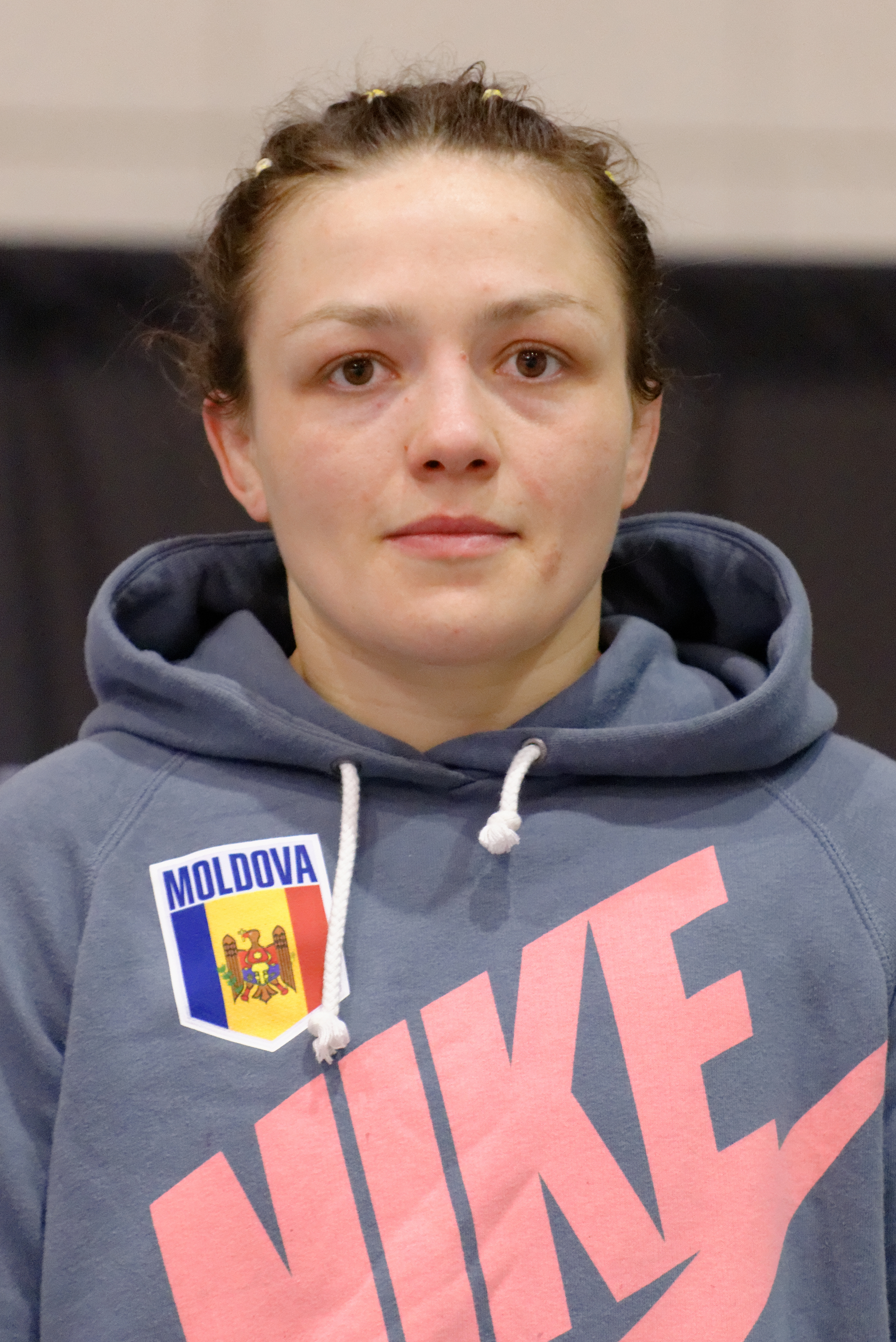
- Saenko at the 2014 Paris Golden Grand Prix

Personal information
- Born: 27 October 1982 (age 43) Sumy, Ukrainian SSR, Soviet Union
- Height: 1.69 m (5 ft 7 in)

Sport
- Sport: Freestyle wrestling
- Coached by: Victor Peicov

Svetlana Saenko (born 27 October 1982) is a Ukrainian born wrestler who represented Moldova at the 2012 Summer Olympics.

Saenko was born in Sumy, Ukrainian SSR, Soviet Union. She competed for Ukraine at the 2004 Summer Olympics. At the 2012 Summer Olympics held in London, United Kingdom, she competed in the women's freestyle 72 kg event where she reached the quarterfinals before being defeated by China's Wang Jiao. In June 2015, she competed in the inaugural European Games, for Moldova in wrestling, more specifically, Women's Freestyle in the 75 kilogram range. She earned a bronze medal.
