= Ohenewa Akuffo =

Canadian freestyle wrestler (born 1979)

Personal information
- Born: February 15, 1979 (age 47) York, Ontario, Canada
- Height: 169 cm (5 ft 7 in)
- Weight: 72 kg (159 lb)
Medal record
Women's freestyle wrestling
Representing Canada
World Championships
Silver medal – second place	2010 Moscow	72 kg
Bronze medal – third place	2008 Tokyo	72 kg
Commonwealth Games
Gold medal – first place	2010 Delhi	72 kg
Pan American Games
Silver medal – second place	2003 Santo Domingo	72 kg
Silver medal – second place	2007 Rio de Janeiro	72 kg
World Student Games
Gold medal – first place	2005 Izmir	72 kg

Ohenewa Akuffo (born February 15, 1979) is a Canadian Olympic freestyle wrestler.

== Education ==
=== High School ===
Ohenewa Akuffo attended Ascension Secondary School in Mississauga, Ontario. And later moved to Brampton where she wrestled for St. Augustine Secondary School.

=== University ===
Akuffo graduated from York University in 2011 with a degree in Business with honors in Marketing and a Certificate of Management and Sports Administration.

== Wrestling career ==
Ohenewa Akuffo is a Brampton, Ontario, native who competed in Olympic-style wrestling for 20 years. Throughout her career as a high-performance athlete, Ohenewa has represented Canada in several World Championships. She has traveled around the world for numerous competitions, has won many feats and was a presenter at the 2013 International Olympic Academy Young Participants' Session. Her notable achievements include:

- Commonwealth Games Gold medallist
- World Silver & Bronze medallist
- 2009 Brampton Hall of Fame Inductee
- Canadian Olympian
- Two-time silver medallist at the Pan American Games
- Ten-time Senior National Champion

She won a bronze medal on 2008 FILA Wrestling World Championships.

== Professional career ==
Ohenewa Akuffo is a public speaker and life coach.

== Personal life ==
Akuffo is of Ghanaian descent. Akuffo lived in Accra, Ghana (West Africa) from the ages of three to eight.
