= Kyoko Hamaguchi =

Japanese freestyle wrestler

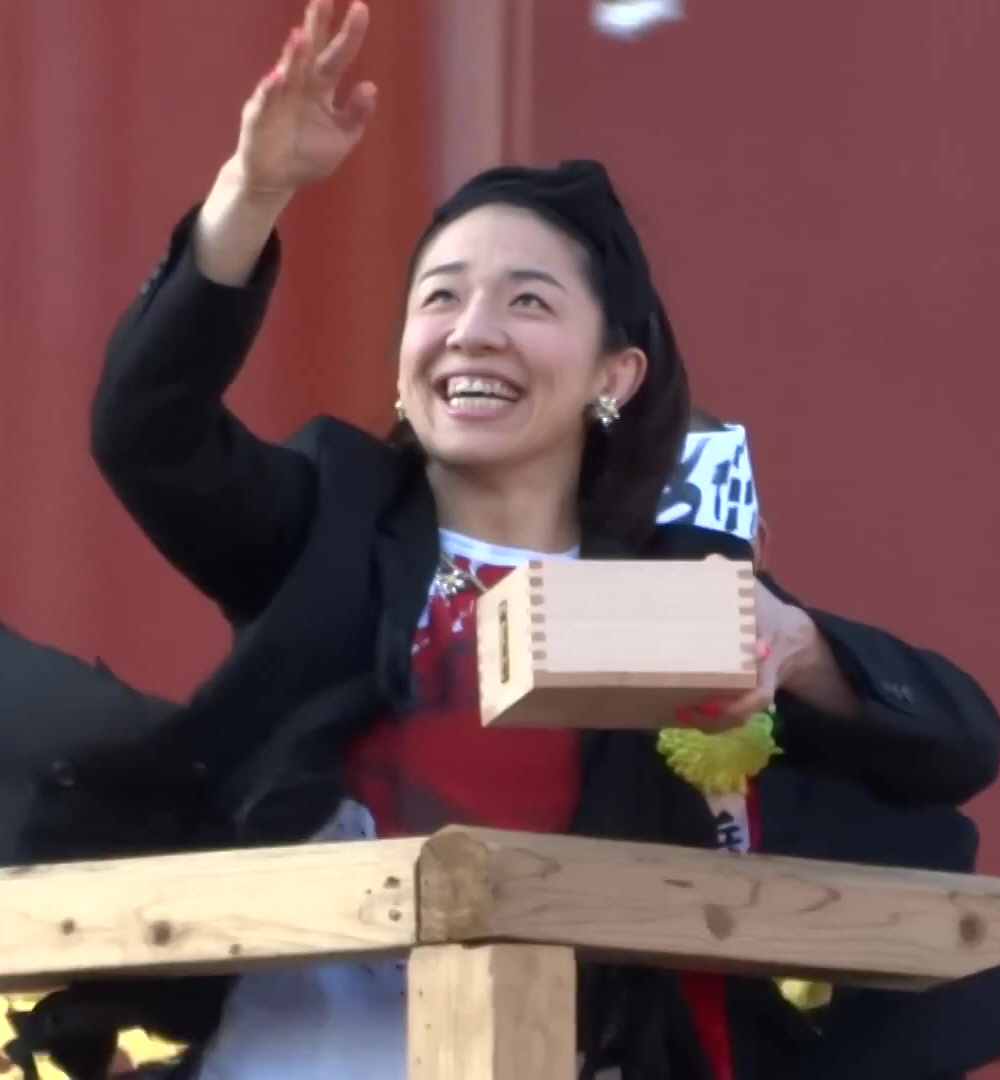
- Hamaguchi in 2015

Medal record

Women's freestyle wrestling

Representing Japan

Olympic Games
Bronze medal – third place	2004 Athens	72 kg
Bronze medal – third place	2008 Beijing	72 kg

World Championships
Gold medal – first place	1997 Clermond-Ferrand	75 kg
Gold medal – first place	1998 Poznan	75 kg
Gold medal – first place	1999 Hildursborg	75 kg
Gold medal – first place	2002 Chalkida	72 kg
Gold medal – first place	2003 New York	72 kg
Silver medal – second place	2005 Budapest	72 kg
Silver medal – second place	2006 Guangzhou	72 kg
Bronze medal – third place	2000 Sofia	75 kg
Bronze medal – third place	2008 Tokyo	72 kg
Bronze medal – third place	2010 Moscow	72 kg

Asian Games
Gold medal – first place	2002 Busan	72kg
Silver medal – second place	2006 Doha	72 kg
Bronze medal – third place	2010 Guangzhou	72 kg

Kyoko Hamaguchi (浜口 京子, Hamaguchi Kyōko; born January 11, 1978 in Taito, Tokyo) is a Japanese freestyle wrestler. She has won five FILA Wrestling World Championships and two Olympic Bronze medals in the 72 kg weight class.

She is sponsored by Japan Beverage Inc. and was nominated by the Japanese Olympic Committee's Special Athlete Campaign.

Her father is professional wrestler Animal Hamaguchi, who is known for his emotional displays during Kyoko's matches. Although Kyoko has long wanted to follow in her father's footsteps and enter the professional game, the lack of a stable women's circuit since the collapse of All Japan Women's Pro-Wrestling has kept her from doing so.

== Early life and career ==
She swam while in junior high school. At the age of fourteen, she decided that she wanted to be a female professional wrestler and trained in the Animal Hamaguchi's Wrestling Dojo.

She won the Japan Championship every year from 1996 to 2006, and won the World Championships five times. In both the 2004 Athens Olympics and the 2008 Beijing Olympics, she won a bronze medal in the 72 kg class. She was also a flag bearer for the Japanese team in the opening Olympic ceremonies in 2004.

In 2011, Japanese wrestler Kyoko Hamaguchi won her record 15th All-Japan Wrestling Championship title — the most victories by any male or female wrestler in the tournament's history.

== Results ==
- 1996 - win - Japan Championship (70 kg)
- 1997 - win - Japan Championship (70 kg)
- 1997 - win - World Championship (75 kg)
- 1998 - win - Japan Championship (75 kg)
- 1998 - win - World Championship (75 kg)
- 1998 - FILA's female wrestler of the year
- 1999 - win - Japan Championship (75 kg)
- 1999 - win - World Championship (75 kg)
- 2000 - win - Japan Championship (75 kg)
- 2001 - win - Japan Championship (75 kg)
- 2001 - win - East Asia Competition
- 2002 - win - Japan Championship (72 kg)
- 2002 - win - World Championship (72 kg)
- 2002 - win - Asian Games at Busan (72 kg)
- 2003 - win - Japan Championship (72 kg)
- 2003 - win - World Championship (72 kg)
- 2004 - 2nd - Testing Competition for Athens Olympics (72 kg)
- 2004 - 3rd - Athens Olympics (72 kg)
- 2004 - win - Japan Championship (72 kg)
- 2005 - 2nd - World Championship (72 kg)
- 2005 - win - Japan Championship (72 kg) (winning for 10 years), MVP (天皇杯 (Ten'noh-hai))
- 2006 - win - Japan Queen's Cup (72 kg)
- 2006 - 2nd - World Cup (72 kg)
- 2006 - 2nd - Asian Games (72 kg)
- 2007 - 2nd - Asia Championship (72 kg)
- 2008 - 2nd - Asia Championship (72 kg)
- 2008 - 3rd - Beijing Olympics (72 kg)

== Awards ==
- Tokyo Sports
  - Wrestling Special Award (1998, 1999, 2002–2006)

Olympic Games
Preceded by Kosei Inoue	Flagbearer for Japan; Athens 2004	Succeeded by Ai Fukuhara
