= Stanka Zlateva =

Bulgarian freestyle wrestler

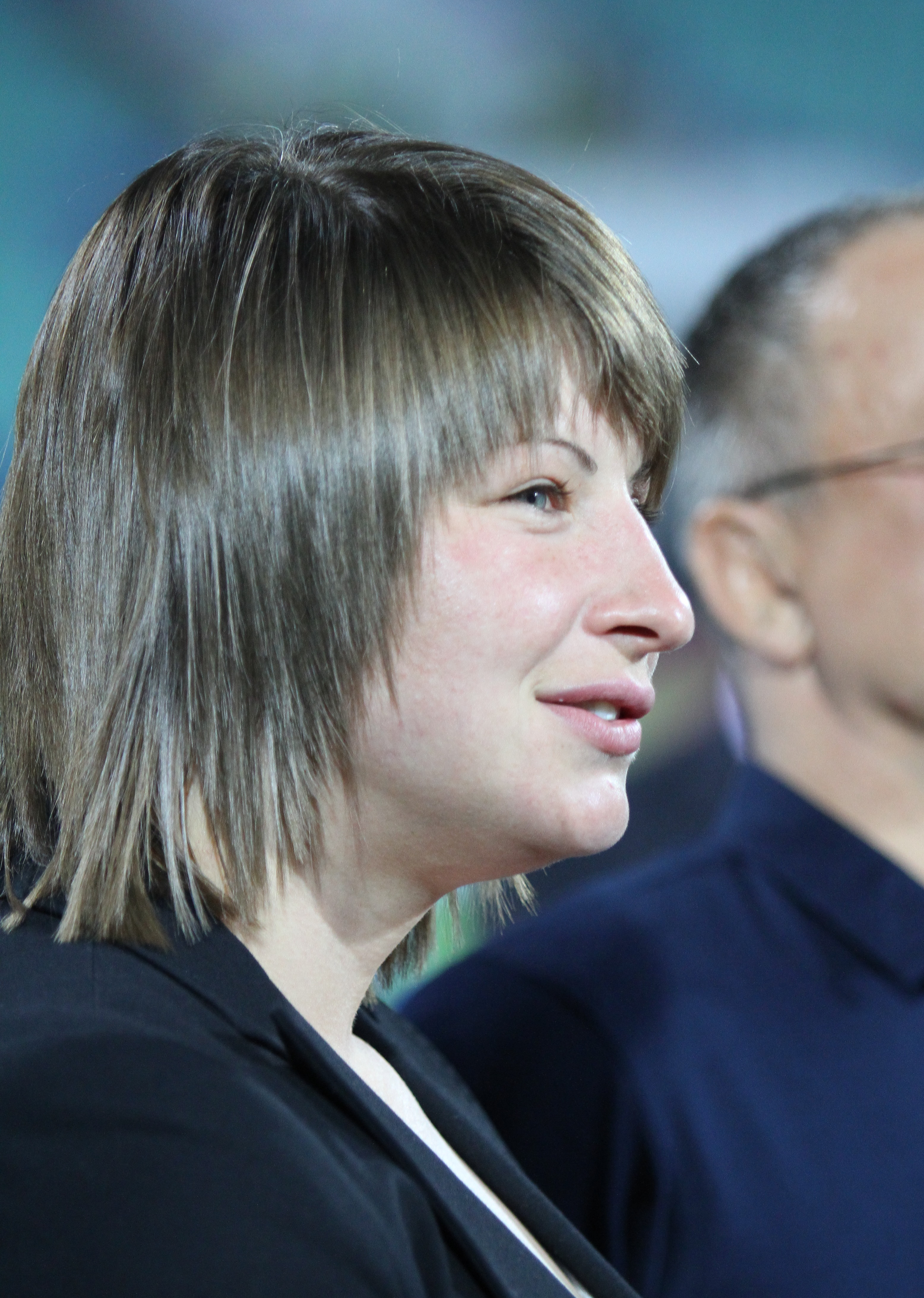

Medal record

Women's freestyle wrestling

Representing Bulgaria

Olympic Games
Silver medal – second place	2008 Beijing	72 kg
Silver medal – second place	2012 London	72 kg

World Championships
Gold medal – first place	2006 Guangzhou	72 kg
Gold medal – first place	2007 Baku	72 kg
Gold medal – first place	2008 Tokyo	72 kg
Gold medal – first place	2010 Moscow	72 kg
Gold medal – first place	2011 Istanbul	72 kg
Bronze medal – third place	2009 Herning	72 kg

European Championships
Gold medal – first place	2006 Moscow	72 kg
Gold medal – first place	2007 Sofia	72 kg
Gold medal – first place	2008 Tampere	72 kg
Gold medal – first place	2009 Vilnius	72 kg
Gold medal – first place	2010 Baku	72 kg
Gold medal – first place	2014 Vantaa	75 kg
Bronze medal – third place	2005 Varna	72 kg
Bronze medal – third place	2011 Dortmund	72 kg

Stanka Zlateva Hristova (Bulgarian: Станка Златева Христова; born 1 March 1983 in Krushare, Sliven Province) is a retired female Bulgarian freestyle wrestler. She competed at the 2004 Summer Olympics in Athens, the 2008 Summer Olympics in Beijing and the 2012 Summer Olympics in London, winning silver medals in the latter two events. She was named World Female Wrestler of the Year in 2006 and 2007 and Bulgarian Sportsperson of the Year in 2007, 2010 and 2011. She was named the BTA Best Balkan Athlete of the Year in 2010.

== Biography ==
Stanka Zlateva grew up in an athletic family. Her original mentor was her brother, who was older than her by 8 years, who was also a wrestling champion and had earned medals in high school tournaments. He trained the young Stanka in different sports from age of 10. He admits that his sister's progress in sports surprised him to the extent that shortly, wrestling with his younger sister became a difficult challenge and served as a great training for him. By the time she was 12, she was able to pin her brother in a matter of seconds in wrestling matches. Despite his wish to serve his own training goals, she was no longer interested in wrestling her 20-year-old brother. In an informal wrestling match, when she was 13, she competed against the local 17-year-old male wrestling champion in the province of Sliven in Bulgaria. She pinned him two minutes after the start of the match. This event resulted in public attention for young Zlateva's wrestling skills. Subsequently, in 1997 at age 14, she was formally engaged in wrestling training by a professional coach, Demir Demirev and subsequently she was trained by Valeri Raychev in the Kyustendil sports club and in the national team, as well as with Ognyan Raychev in the national team. Since 2006, she has been competing for Levski Sofia, where her coach is former world champion and triple European champion Simeon Shterev. Zlateva formerly attended the sports school "Pierre de Coubertin" in Yambol.

In late 2010, it was revealed that Zlateva had been offered to compete for Azerbaijan at the 2012 Olympics, but had steadfastly refused to discuss any such possibility with the Azeris, as she would only be willing to represent Bulgaria. She had previously turned down similar attempts by Kazakhstan and Uzbekistan to encourage a nationality switch.

On 18 March 2026, representatives of 50 Bulgarian wrestling clubs submitted a formal request to the Bulgarian Wrestling Federation and the Ministry of Youth and Sports to convene an extraordinary General Assembly. The main goals of the requested assembly are to change the federation's leadership, including the removal of Zlateva its president, and to adopt a new statute. The initiative, represented by lawyer Stanislav Trendafilov, stems from ongoing disputes over centralized training policies versus athletes' preference for working with personal coaches.

== Medals and awards ==
Zlateva came first in her category at the 2006, 2007, 2008, 2010 and 2011 World Championships (in Baku, Guangzhou, Tokyo, Moscow and Istanbul respectively), third in 2009 (Herning), fourth in 2004 (New York City), fifth in 2005 (Budapest), seventh in 2001 (Sofia) and eight in 2002 (Chalcis).

She also has 5 European championships, winning the 2006, 2007, 2008, 2009 and 2010 titles (Moscow, Sofia, Tampere, Vilnius and Baku respectively), as well as coming third in 2005 and 2011 (Varna and Dortmund), fourth in 2003 and fifth in 2004.

She was the first Bulgarian female wrestler at the Olympics as women's wrestling debuted at the 2004 Games in Athens, and Zlateva represented Bulgaria there, coming twelfth. At the 2008 Olympics in Beijing, she was aspiring to win gold, but lost to the surprise champion Wang Jiao of the People's Republic of China in the final. She has qualified for the 2012 Olympics automatically as the gold medalist in the 2011 World Wrestling Championships.

On 19 December 2011, Zlateva was honoured with the title of Bulgarian Sportsperson of the Year for the third time since the start of her wrestling career, becoming joint equal with Boyan Radev regarding the number of times a Bulgarian wrestler had won the distinction.

On 9 August 2012, she reached the final of the Women's freestyle 72 kg wrestling competition at the 2012 Summer Olympics, but was defeated by Russian Natalia Vorobieva. Zlateva won the first period by a score of 1:0, but her opponent managed to pin her during the second one, which secured Vorobieva's title. Zlateva was her country's flagbearer during the closing ceremony of the games.

After the 2012 Summer Olympics, Zlateva took a break from wrestling which lasted until April 2014, when she switched to the 75 kg category.

== Media appearances ==
In 2013, Zlateva won the Bulgarian version of VIP Brother.
