= Adeline Gray =

American wrestler (born 1991)

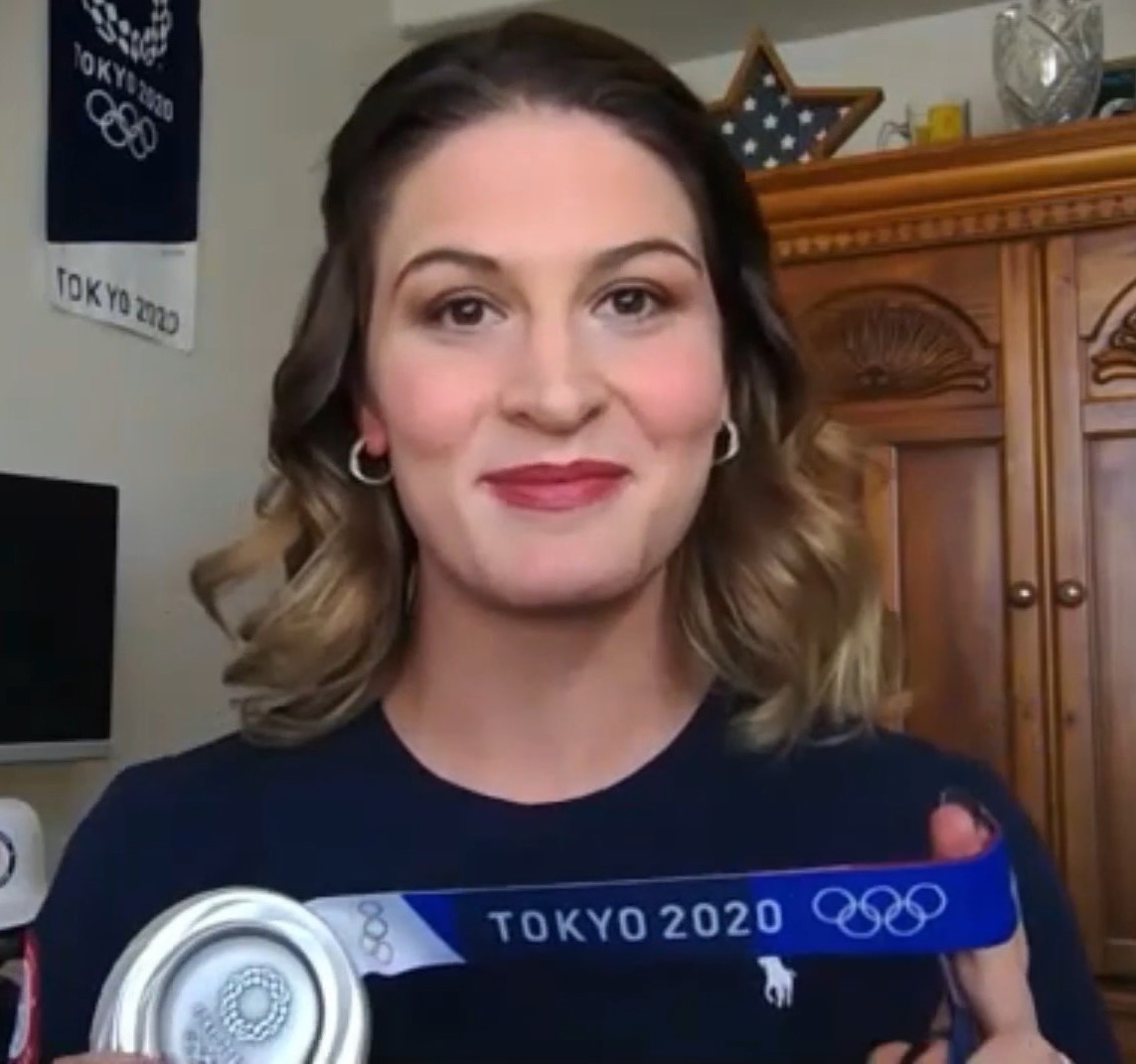
- Gray in 2021

Personal information
- Full name: Adeline Maria Gray
- Born: January 15, 1991 (age 35) Denver, Colorado, U.S.
- Height: 5 ft 8 in (173 cm)
- Spouse: Damaris Sanders

Sport
- Country: United States
- Sport: Wrestling
- Event: Freestyle
- University team: DeVry University
- Club: New York Athletic Club
- Team: USA
- Coached by: Terry Steiner, Nate Engel

Achievements and titles
- Olympic finals: 1
- World finals: 6
- National finals: 5
- Highest world ranking: 1
Medal record
Women's freestyle wrestling
Representing the United States
Olympic Games
Silver medal – second place	2020 Tokyo	76 kg
World Championships
Gold medal – first place	2012 Strathcona	67 kg
Gold medal – first place	2014 Tashkent	75 kg
Gold medal – first place	2015 Las Vegas	75 kg
Gold medal – first place	2018 Budapest	76 kg
Gold medal – first place	2019 Nur-Sultan	76 kg
Gold medal – first place	2021 Oslo	76 kg
Bronze medal – third place	2011 Istanbul	67 kg
Bronze medal – third place	2013 Budapest	72 kg
Bronze medal – third place	2023 Belgrade	76 kg
Pan American Games
Gold medal – first place	2015 Toronto	75 kg
Pan American Championships
Gold medal – first place	2018 Lima	76 kg
Gold medal – first place	2019 Buenos Aires	76 kg
Gold medal – first place	2021 Guatemala City	76 kg
Silver medal – second place	2020 Ottawa	76 kg
Bronze medal – third place	2024 Acapulco	76 kg
- Updated on 26 February 2024

Adeline Maria Gray (born January 15, 1991) is an American freestyle wrestler who currently competes at 76 kilograms. She is a six-time world champion (2012, 2014, 2015, 2018, 2019, 2021) and a two-time Olympian (2016, 2020), having won her first medal, a silver, at the 2020 Summer Olympics. She is the first American woman to win back-to-back wrestling world titles since Tricia Saunders in 1998 and 1999. She is also the first American woman wrestler to win six world championships.

== Early life ==
Gray was born on January 15, 1991, in Denver, Colorado to George and Donna Gray, and has three younger sisters, including fellow wrestler Geneva Gray and began her wrestling career with the help of her father. She graduated from Bear Creek High School in Lakewood, Colorado.

== Career ==
On September 27, 2012, Gray competed in the 2012 Women's World Wrestling Championships in Edmonton, Canada. In her first match against Dzhanan Manolova of Bulgaria, Adeline came out a little slow, then exploded with a great 3 point throw and won the 1st period 3–0. In the second period, she took Manolova down and turned her in a leg lace for another point, then she just defended the rest of the period for a 2–0 win. In the next round, she faced off against Yoshiko Inoue of Japan, the only one to score on Adeline. Inoue scored first in the first period but Adeline came back and scored on a push out to secure the first period win. In the second period, Adeline looked in control with her under hooks, scoring a throw-by and getting her leg lace for a 3–0 win. In the Semi-Finals against Kaur Navjot of India, she looked very confident and showed no fear and dominated Navjot from the start. Adeline secured her second takedown and controlled her legs standing tilts to a stack for the pin.

In the Finals, Gray faced off against the 2012 Jr World Champion, Dorothy Yeats of Canada, only 19 years old and the crowd favorite. Adeline came out very confident and took it to Yeats, throwing her for 3 points and scoring in another takedown to win the 1st period 4–0. In the second period, Adeline stayed in control and secured a takedown late in the period, then put Yeats on her back with her signature arm-bar-wing and pinned her with 4 seconds left for a dominating win.

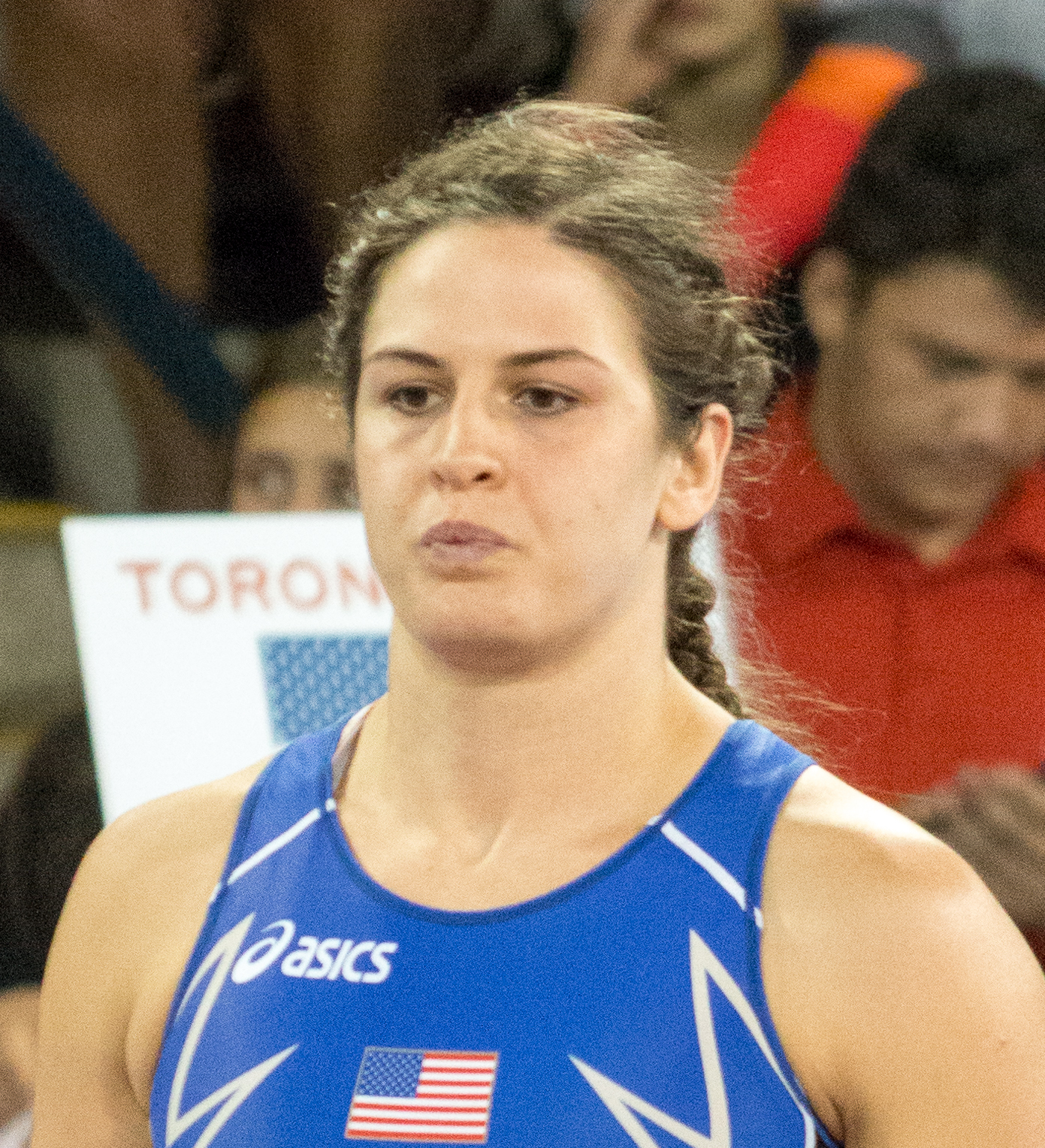
Gray at the 2015 Pan Am Games

Gray competed in the 75 kg event at the 2016 Summer Olympics, where she won her first match against Andrea Olaya of Colombia, but lost her quarterfinal match against Vasilisa Marzaliuk of Belarus.

Gray spent the 2017 season recuperating from injuries, missing the 2017 World Championships.

She returned from her injuries in 2018, winning gold at the 2018 World Wrestling Championships. In 2019, she won gold at the 2019 Pan American Wrestling Championships. Later that year, she won her fifth gold medal at the World Wrestling Championships, becoming the first American wrestler to win five golds at the World Championships. She won silver at the 2020 Pan American Wrestling Championships, winning her first two matches, before withdrawing from her gold medal match against Justina Di Stasio of Canada due to rib fractures.

At the 2020 U.S. Olympic Wrestling Trials, Gray defeated Kylie Welker by technical superiority twice, qualifying to represent the United States at the 2020 Summer Olympics. In her opening bout, she won by fall against 2020 African Wrestling Championships gold medalist Zaineb Sghaier. In the quarterfinals, she defeated former world champion and four-time European champion Yasemin Adar by a score of 6–4. In the semifinals, she defeated two-time Asian Wrestling Championships finalist Aiperi Medet Kyzy by a score of 3–2. She was awarded a silver medal after being defeated by former world champion Aline Rotter-Focken by a score of 7–3 in the gold medal match.

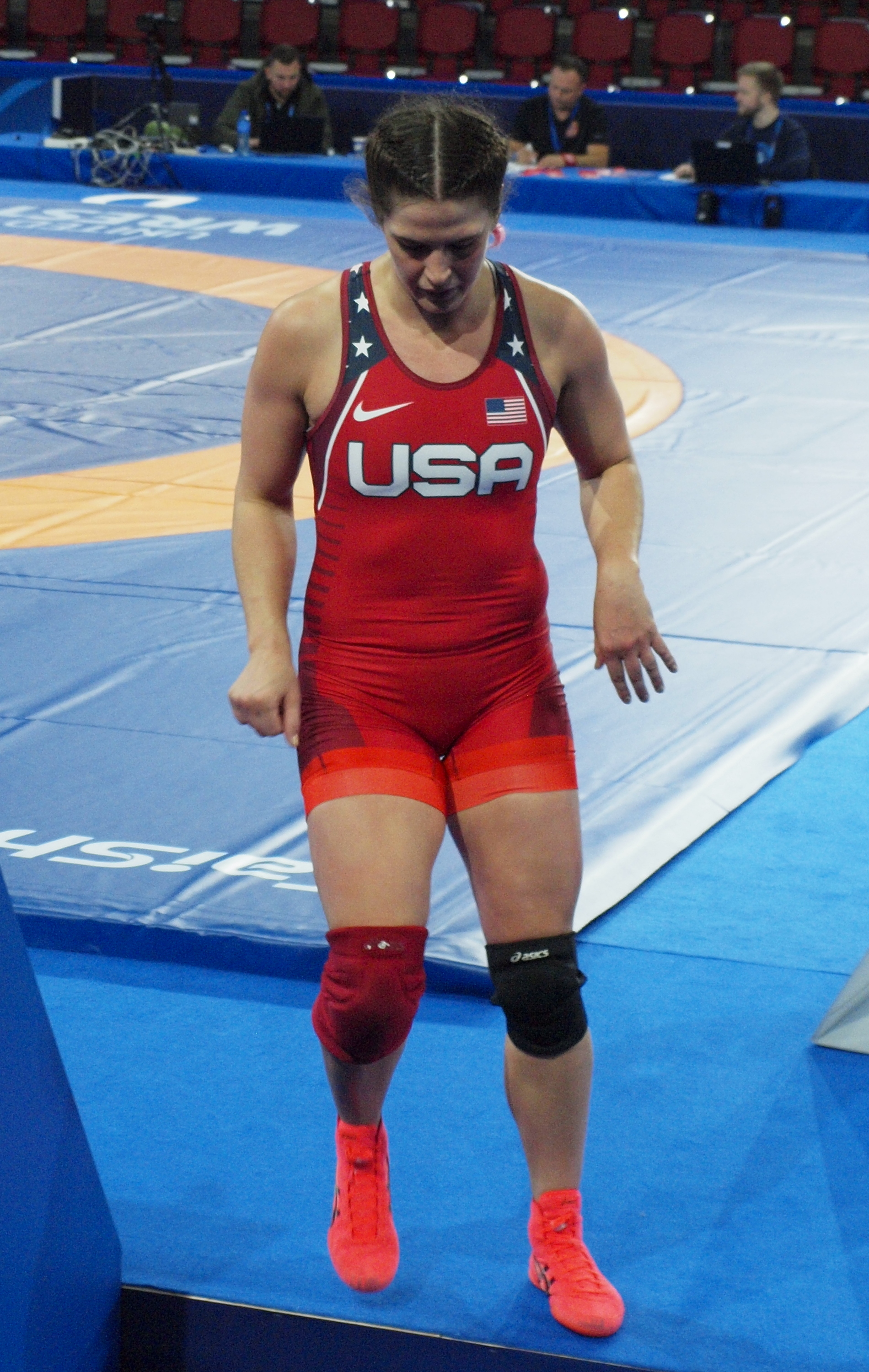
Gray at the 2021 World Wrestling Championships

In 2021, she won the gold medal in the women's 76 kg event at the World Wrestling Championships held in Oslo, Norway. Gray won one of the bronze medals in the women's 76 kg event at the 2023 World Wrestling Championships held in Belgrade, Serbia. She defeated Milaimys Marín of Cuba in her bronze medal match. Gray also earned a quota place for the United States for the 2024 Summer Olympics in Paris, France.

Gray won a bronze medal in the women's 76 kg event at the 2024 Pan American Wrestling Championships held in Acapulco, Mexico.

== Endorsements ==
Gray is the first female wrestler to have her own signature shoe. The ASICS Aggressor 3 L.E. Adeline Gray wrestling shoe, a special edition signature shoe designed by Gray.

== Personal life ==
Gray advocates against sexism in wrestling. She promotes equal recognition for and participation of women at elite levels, including Olympic and collegiate level wrestling.

== International matches ==
Res.	Record	Opponent	Score	Date	Event	Location
2021 World Champion
Win	52-5	(Estonia) Epp Mae	Fall (6-4)	October 4, 2021	2021 World Wrestling Championships	(Norway) Oslo
Win	51-5	(Egypt) Samar Amer	Fall (11-1)	October 4, 2021	2021 World Wrestling Championships	(Norway) Oslo
Win	50-5	(India) Kiran Bishnoi	Fall (5-0)	October 4, 2021	2021 World Wrestling Championships	(Norway) Oslo
Win	49-5	(Turkey) Ayşegül Özbege	Fall (4-0)	October 4, 2021	2021 World Wrestling Championships	(Norway) Oslo
2021 Olympic Silver Medalist
Loss	48-5	(Germany) Aline Rotter-Focken	7-3	August 2, 2021	2021 Olympic Games	(Japan) Tokyo
Win	48-4	(Kyrgyzstan) Aiperi Medet Kyzy	3-2	August 2, 2021	2021 Olympic Games	(Japan) Tokyo
Win	47-4	(Turkey) Yasemin Adar	6-4	August 2, 2021	2021 Olympic Games	(Japan) Tokyo
Win	46-4	(Tunisia) Zaineb Sghaier	Fall 2:11	August 2, 2021	2021 Olympic Games	(Japan) Tokyo
2021 Pan American Champion
Win	45-4	(Brazil) Aline Ferreira	8-0	May 27, 2021	2021 Pan American Wrestling Championships	Guatemala City
Win	44-4	(Colombia) Luisa Mosquera	Forfeit (0-0)	May 27, 2021	2021 Pan American Wrestling Championships	Guatemala City
Win	43-4	(El Salvador) Josselyn Portillo	Fall (4-0)	May 27, 2021	2021 Pan American Wrestling Championships	Guatemala City
Win	42-4	(Ecuador) Genesis Reasco Valdez	Tech Fall (12-2)	May 27, 2021	2021 Pan American Wrestling Championships	Guatemala City
2020 Pan American Silver Medalist
Loss	41-4	(Canada) Justina Di Stasio	Injury default (0-0)	March 14, 2020	2020 Pan American Wrestling Championships	(Canada) Ottawa
Win	41–3	(Colombia) Andrea Olaya	Tech Fall (11–0)	March 14, 2020	2020 Pan American Wrestling Championships	(Canada) Ottawa
Win	40–3	(Venezuela) Andrimar Daniela Lazaro Diaz	2–0	March 14, 2020	2020 Pan American Wrestling Championships	(Canada) Ottawa
2019 World Champion
Win	39–3	(Japan) Hiroe Minagawa	4–2	September 19, 2019	2019 World Championships	(Kazakhstan) Nur-Sultan
Win	38–3	(Germany) Aline Rotter-Focken	5–2	September 18, 2019	2019 World Championships	(Kazakhstan) Nur-Sultan
Win	37–3	(Chinese Taipei) Chang Hui-tsz	Tech Fall (10–0)	September 18, 2019	2019 World Championships	(Kazakhstan) Nur-Sultan
Win	36–3	(Kazakhstan) Elmira Syzdykova	Tech Fall (10–0)	September 18, 2019	2019 World Championships	(Kazakhstan) Nur-Sultan
Win	35–3	(Italy) Eleni Pjollaj	Tech Fall (10–0)	September 18, 2019	2019 World Championships	(Kazakhstan) Nur-Sultan
2019 Pan American Champion
Win	34–3	(Ecuador) Genesis Reasco Valdez	Fall	April 21, 2019	2019 Pan American Wrestling Championships	(Argentina) Buenos Aires
Win	33–3	(Cuba) Mabelkis Capote	Tech Fall (10–0)	April 21, 2019	2019 Pan American Wrestling Championships	(Argentina) Buenos Aires
Win	32–3	(Canada) Erica Wiebe	Tech Fall (10–0)	April 21, 2019	2019 Pan American Wrestling Championships	(Argentina) Buenos Aires
Win	31–3	(Venezuela) María Acosta	Tech Fall (10–0)	April 21, 2019	2019 Pan American Wrestling Championships	(Argentina) Buenos Aires
2018 World Champion
Win	30–3	(Turkey) Yasemin Adar	Tech Fall (13–1)	October 24, 2018	2018 World Championships	(Hungary) Budapest
Win	29–3	(Canada) Erica Wiebe	3–1	October 23, 2018	2018 World Championships	(Hungary) Budapest
Win	28–3	(Kazakhstan) Elmira Syzdykova	Fall	October 23, 2018	2018 World Championships	(Hungary) Budapest
Win	27–3	(Estonia) Epp Mäe	Tech Fall (10–0)	October 23, 2018	2018 World Championships	(Hungary) Budapest
2018 Pan American Champion
Win	26-2	(Colombia) Andrea Olaya	Fall (10-1)	May 3, 2018	2018 Pan-American Wrestling Championships	(Peru) Lima
Win	25–2	(Brazil) Aline Ferreira	Fall (4-0)	May 3, 2018	2018 Pan-American Wrestling Championships	(Peru) Lima
Win	24–2	(Cuba) Mabelkis Capote	Fall (4-0)	May 3, 2018	2018 Pan-American Wrestling Championships	(Peru) Lima
2016 Summer Olympics
Loss	23–3	(Belarus) Vasilisa Marzaliuk	1–4	August 18, 2016	2016 Summer Olympics	(Brazil) Rio de Janeiro
Win	23–2	(Colombia) Andrea Olaya	Fall	August 18, 2016	2016 Summer Olympics	(Brazil) Rio de Janeiro
2015 World Champion
Win	22–2	(China) Zhou Qian	Tech Fall (13–2)	September 10, 2015	2015 World Championships	(United States) Las Vegas, NV
Win	21–2	(Brazil) Aline Ferreira	10–2	September 10, 2015	2015 World Championships	(United States) Las Vegas, NV
Win	20–2	(Poland) Daria Osocka	Tech Fall (10–0)	September 10, 2015	2015 World Championships	(United States) Las Vegas, NV
Win	19–2	(Belarus) Vasilisa Marzaliuk	6–0	September 10, 2015	2015 World Championships	(United States) Las Vegas, NV
Win	18–2	(Mongolia) Gelegjamtsyn Naranchimeg	Tech Fall (10–0)	September 10, 2015	2015 World Championships	(United States) Las Vegas, NV
2015 Pan American Games
Win	17–2	(Canada) Justina Di Stasio	7–6	July 17, 2015	2015 Pan American Games Champion	(Canada) Toronto, ON
Win	16–2	(Puerto Rico) Ana Gonzalez	Tech Fall (12–0)	July 17, 2015	2015 Pan American Games Champion	(Canada) Toronto, ON
Win	15–2	(Brazil) Aline Ferreira	Tech Fall (10–0)	July 17, 2015	2015 Pan American Games Champion	(Canada) Toronto, ON
2014 World Champion
Win	14–2	(Brazil) Aline Ferreira	2–1	September 11, 2014	2014 World Championship	(Uzbekistan) Tashkent
Win	13–2	(Estonia) Epp Mäe	5–1	September 11, 2014	2014 World Championship	(Uzbekistan) Tashkent
Win	12–2	(Japan) Hiroe Suzuki	2–1	September 11, 2014	2014 World Championship	(Uzbekistan) Tashkent
Win	11–2	(Turkey) Yasemin Adar	Fall	September 11, 2014	2014 World Championship	(Uzbekistan) Tashkent
Win	10–2	(China) Zhou Qian	11–10	September 11, 2014	2014 World Championship	(Uzbekistan) Tashkent
2013 World Bronze Medalist
Win	9–2	(Turkey) Yasemin Adar	8–2	September 20, 2013	2013 World Championship	(Hungary) Budapest
Win	8–2	(Kazakhstan) Guzel Manyurova	2–1	September 20, 2013	2013 World Championship	(Hungary) Budapest
Loss	7–2	(China) Zhang Fengliu	2–1	September 20, 2013	2013 World Championship	(Hungary) Budapest
Win	7–1	(Colombia) Andrea Olaya	Fall	September 20, 2013	2013 World Championship	(Hungary) Budapest
2012 World Champion
Win	6–1	(Canada) Dorothy Yeats	Fall	September 26, 2012	2012 World Championship	(Canada) Strathcona County, AL
Win	5–1	(India) Navjot Kaur	Fall	September 26, 2012	2012 World Championship	(Canada) Strathcona County, AL
Win	4–1	(Japan) Yoshiko Inoue	1–1, 3–0	September 26, 2012	2012 World Championship	(Canada) Strathcona County, AL
Win	3–1	(Bulgaria) Dzhanan Manolova	2–0, 3–0	September 26, 2012	2012 World Championship	(Canada) Strathcona County, AL
2011 World Bronze Medalist
Win	2–1	(Turkey) Burcu Örskaya	1–0, 1–0	September 16, 2011	2011 World Championship	(Turkey) Istanbul
Win	1–1	(Canada) Martine Dugrenier	1–1, 3–1	September 16, 2011	2011 World Championship	(Turkey) Istanbul
Loss	0–1	(China) Xiluo Zhuoma	1–4, 0–1	September 16, 2011	2011 World Championship	(Turkey) Istanbul
