= 2013 World Wrestling Championships – Women's freestyle 72 kg =

Women's freestyle 72 kg at the 2013 World Championships
- Venue: László Papp Budapest Sports Arena
- Dates: 20 September 2013
- Competitors: 25 from 25 nations

Medalists
gold medal	Zhang Fengliu	China
silver medal	Natalia Vorobieva	Russia
bronze medal	Adeline Gray	United States
bronze medal	Ochirbatyn Burmaa	Mongolia

The women's freestyle 72 kilograms is a competition featured at the 2013 World Wrestling Championships, and was held at the László Papp Budapest Sports Arena in Budapest, Hungary on 20 September 2013.

This freestyle wrestling competition consisted of a single-elimination tournament, with a repechage used to determine the winners of two bronze medals.

== Results ==
Legend

- F — Won by fall
- WO — Won by walkover

=== Final ===
Final
Zhang Fengliu (CHN)	3^{F}
Natalia Vorobieva (RUS)	5

=== Top half ===
Round of 32
Yasemin Adar (TUR)	9^{F}
Jyoti (IND)	5

Round of 16
Guzel Manyurova (KAZ)	4
Zhang Fengliu (CHN)	4^{F}
Andrea Olaya (COL)	2
Adeline Gray (USA)	4^{F}
Heo Nam-ju (KOR)	WO
Annabelle Ali (CMR)
Aline Ferreira (BRA)	0
Yasemin Adar (TUR)	8

Quarterfinals
Zhang Fengliu (CHN)	9
Adeline Gray (USA)	2
Heo Nam-ju (KOR)	0
Yasemin Adar (TUR)	8^{F}

Semifinals
Zhang Fengliu (CHN)	10
Yasemin Adar (TUR)	3

=== Bottom half ===
Round of 32
Marina Gastl (AUT)	2
Cynthia Vescan (FRA)	5
Epp Mäe (EST)	9
Zsanett Németh (HUN)	1
Svetlana Saenko (MDA)	7
Jaramit Weffer (VEN)	0
Maria Selmaier (GER)	7
Maryna Mospan (UKR)	0
Lisset Hechavarría (CUB)	0
Erica Wiebe (CAN)	7
Jenny Fransson (SWE)	6
Vasilisa Marzaliuk (BLR)	0
Hiroe Suzuki (JPN)	8^{F}
Ilana Kratysh (ISR)	0
Ochirbatyn Burmaa (MGL)	0
Natalia Vorobieva (RUS)	7

Round of 16
Cynthia Vescan (FRA)	9
Epp Mäe (EST)	1
Svetlana Saenko (MDA)	12
Maria Selmaier (GER)	3
Erica Wiebe (CAN)	8^{F}
Jenny Fransson (SWE)	4
Hiroe Suzuki (JPN)	0
Natalia Vorobieva (RUS)	3^{F}

Quarterfinals
Cynthia Vescan (FRA)	1
Svetlana Saenko (MDA)	2
Erica Wiebe (CAN)	0
Natalia Vorobieva (RUS)	3^{F}

Semifinals
Svetlana Saenko (MDA)	0
Natalia Vorobieva (RUS)	8

=== Repechage ===
Repechage round 1
Ochirbatyn Burmaa (MGL)	5
Hiroe Suzuki (JPN)	1

Repechage round 2
Guzel Manyurova (KAZ)	1
Adeline Gray (USA)	2
Ochirbatyn Burmaa (MGL)	5
Erica Wiebe (CAN)	3

Bronze medals
Adeline Gray (USA)	8
Yasemin Adar (TUR)	2
Ochirbatyn Burmaa (MGL)	3
Svetlana Saenko (MDA)	0
