= Terry Steiner =

American wrestler

Personal information
- Born: August 27, 1970 (age 55)
- Home town: Bismarck, North Dakota, U.S.
- Height: 5 ft 8 in (173 cm)
- Weight: 69 kg (152 lb)

Sport
- College team: Iowa
- Coach: Dan Gable
Medal record
Collegiate Wrestling
Representing the Iowa Hawkeyes
NCAA Division I Championships
Gold medal – first place	1993 Ames	150 lb
Bronze medal – third place	1991 Iowa City	150 lb
Big Ten Championships
Silver medal – second place	1993 Columbus	150 lb
Bronze medal – third place	1991 Champaign	150 lb
Bronze medal – third place	1992 Madison	150 lb

Terry Steiner (born August 27, 1970) is an American wrestler and wrestling coach, who was an NCAA champion and three-time All-American. He is the women's U.S. National Coach for USA Wrestling. He led the U.S. women’s wrestling to a record four medals at the 2020 Tokyo Olympics: a Gold medal (Tamyra Mensah-Stock), a Silver medal (Adeline Gray) and two Bronze medals (Helen Maroulis and Sarah Hildebrandt).

== Early life and education ==
Steiner is from Bismarck, North Dakota and attended Bismarck Century High School. He wrestled at the University of Iowa, alongside his identical twin, Troy Steiner, who also won an individual NCAA championship. Steiner was coached by Dan Gable, and placed 3rd, 5th, and 1st in 1991, 1992, and 1993 respectively. He graduated from Iowa in 1993 with a B.A. in Social Work.

== Coaching ==
Steiner has been the women's U.S. National Coach for USA Wrestling since 2002. In this capacity, Steiner has been the longtime coach of Adeline Gray, six-time world-champion (2012, 2014, 2015, 2018, 2019, 2021) and two-time (2016, 2020) Olympian.

== Awards and honors ==
Steiner was a Glen Brand inductee into the National Wrestling Hall of Fame in 2013. In 2025, he was honored as a Distinguished Member of the National Wrestling Hall of Fame. Steiner and his brother Troy were awarded the Rough Rider Award in 2026.
