= 2019 World Wrestling Championships – Women's freestyle 76 kg =

Women's freestyle 76 kg at the 2019 World Championships
- Venue: Barys Arena
- Dates: 18–19 September 2019
- Competitors: 31 from 31 nations

Medalists
gold medal	Adeline Gray	United States
silver medal	Hiroe Minagawa	Japan
bronze medal	Epp Mäe	Estonia
bronze medal	Aline Rotter-Focken	Germany

The women's freestyle 76 kilograms is a competition featured at the 2019 World Wrestling Championships, and was held in Nur-Sultan, Kazakhstan on 18 and 19 September.

This freestyle wrestling competition consists of a single-elimination tournament, with a repechage used to determine the winner of two bronze medals. The two finalists face off for gold and silver medals. Each wrestler who loses to one of the two finalists moves into the repechage, culminating in a pair of bronze medal matches featuring the semifinal losers each facing the remaining repechage opponent from their half of the bracket.

== Results ==
Legend

- F — Won by fall

=== Final ===
Final
Hiroe Minagawa (JPN)	2
Adeline Gray (USA)	4

=== Top half ===
Round of 32
Ochirbatyn Burmaa (MGL)	2
Zhou Qian (CHN)	5
Aline Ferreira (BRA)	2
Vasilisa Marzaliuk (BLR)	1
Blessing Onyebuchi (NGR)	7
Hiroe Minagawa (JPN)	10
Epp Mäe (EST)	6
Ekaterina Bukina (RUS)	6
Andrea Olaya (COL)	9^{F}
Naomi de Bruine (AUS)	2
Aiperi Medet Kyzy (KGZ)	10
Mariya Oryashkova (BUL)	0
Zsanett Németh (HUN)	1
Erica Wiebe (CAN)	5

Round of 16
Yasemin Adar (TUR)	3
Zhou Qian (CHN)	4
Aline Ferreira (BRA)	1
Hiroe Minagawa (JPN)	2
Epp Mäe (EST)	11
Andrea Olaya (COL)	0
Aiperi Medet Kyzy (KGZ)	0
Erica Wiebe (CAN)	5

Quarterfinals
Zhou Qian (CHN)	1
Hiroe Minagawa (JPN)	3
Epp Mäe (EST)	4
Erica Wiebe (CAN)	3

Semifinals
Hiroe Minagawa (JPN)	7
Epp Mäe (EST)	0

=== Bottom half ===
Round of 32
Aline Rotter-Focken (GER)	5
Kiran Bishnoi (IND)	4
Sabira Aliyeva (AZE)	5
Hwang Eun-ju (KOR)	2
Alla Belinska (UKR)	6
Svetlana Saenko (MDA)	1
Milaimys Marín (CUB)	5
Daria Palińska (POL)	3^{F}
Kamilė Gaučaitė (LTU)	11^{F}
Shakhribonu Ellieva (UZB)	2
Chang Hui-tsz (TPE)	12
Georgina Nelthorpe (GBR)	2
Elmira Syzdykova (KAZ)	11
Martina Kuenz (AUT)	1
Eleni Pjollaj (ITA)	0
Adeline Gray (USA)	10

Round of 16
Aline Rotter-Focken (GER)	10
Sabira Aliyeva (AZE)	0
Alla Belinska (UKR)	3^{F}
Daria Palińska (POL)	0
Kamilė Gaučaitė (LTU)	0
Chang Hui-tsz (TPE)	4^{F}
Elmira Syzdykova (KAZ)	0
Adeline Gray (USA)	10

Quarterfinals
Aline Rotter-Focken (GER)	5
Alla Belinska (UKR)	1
Chang Hui-tsz (TPE)	0
Adeline Gray (USA)	10

Semifinals
Aline Rotter-Focken (GER)	2
Adeline Gray (USA)	5

=== Repechage ===
Repechage round 1
Blessing Onyebuchi (NGR)	8
Aline Ferreira (BRA)	3
Eleni Pjollaj (ITA)	0
Elmira Syzdykova (KAZ)	10

Repechage round 2
Blessing Onyebuchi (NGR)	1
Zhou Qian (CHN)	12
Elmira Syzdykova (KAZ)	11
Chang Hui-tsz (TPE)	6

Bronze medals
Zhou Qian (CHN)	4
Epp Mäe (EST)	6
Elmira Syzdykova (KAZ)	0
Aline Rotter-Focken (GER)	3
