= 2018 World Wrestling Championships – Women's freestyle 76 kg =

Women's freestyle 76 kg at the 2018 World Championships
- Venue: László Papp Budapest Sports Arena
- Dates: 23–24 October 2018
- Competitors: 22 from 22 nations

Medalists
gold medal	Adeline Gray	United States
silver medal	Yasemin Adar	Turkey
bronze medal	Hiroe Minagawa	Japan
bronze medal	Erica Wiebe	Canada

The women's freestyle 76 kilograms is a competition featured at the 2018 World Wrestling Championships, and was held in Budapest, Hungary on 23 and 24 October.

This freestyle wrestling competition consists of a single-elimination tournament, with a repechage used to determine the winner of two bronze medals. The two finalists face off for gold and silver medals. Each wrestler who loses to one of the two finalists moves into the repechage, culminating in a pair of bronze medal matches featuring the semifinal losers each facing the remaining repechage opponent from their half of the bracket.

== Results ==
Legend

- F — Won by fall
- WO — Won by walkover

=== Final ===
Final
Yasemin Adar (TUR)	1
Adeline Gray (USA)	13

=== Top half ===
Round of 32

Round of 16
Yasemin Adar (TUR)	10
Sabira Aliyeva (AZE)	0
Hiroe Minagawa (JPN)	5
Hwang Eun-ju (KOR)	0
María Acosta (VEN)	0
Gelegjamtsyn Naranchimeg (MGL)	2^{F}
Zsanett Németh (HUN)	8
Vasilisa Marzaliuk (BLR)	6

Quarterfinals
Yasemin Adar (TUR)	7
Hiroe Minagawa (JPN)	0
Gelegjamtsyn Naranchimeg (MGL)	0
Zsanett Németh (HUN)	4

Semifinals
Yasemin Adar (TUR)	9
Zsanett Németh (HUN)	1

=== Bottom half ===
Round of 32
Aiperi Medet Kyzy (KGZ)	1
Paliha (CHN)	2
Anastasiia Shustova (UKR)	0
Aline Focken (GER)	12
Svetlana Saenko (MDA)	2
Cynthia Vescan (FRA)	2
Chang Hui-tsz (TPE)	0
Kiran Bishnoi (IND)	6
Ekaterina Bukina (RUS)	8
Elmira Syzdykova (KAZ)	9
Blessing Onyebuchi (NGR)	13
Epp Mäe (EST)	8^{F}

Round of 16
Erica Wiebe (CAN)	3
Paliha (CHN)	0
Aline Focken (GER)	4
Cynthia Vescan (FRA)	0
Kiran Bishnoi (IND)	2
Elmira Syzdykova (KAZ)	12
Epp Mäe (EST)	0
Adeline Gray (USA)	10

Quarterfinals
Erica Wiebe (CAN)	6
Aline Focken (GER)	4
Elmira Syzdykova (KAZ)	6
Adeline Gray (USA)	7^{F}

Semifinals
Erica Wiebe (CAN)	1
Adeline Gray (USA)	3

=== Repechage ===
Repechage round 2
Sabira Aliyeva (AZE)	0
Hiroe Minagawa (JPN)	10
Epp Mäe (EST)	5
Elmira Syzdykova (KAZ)	3

Bronze medals
Hiroe Minagawa (JPN)	WO
Zsanett Németh (HUN)
Epp Mäe (EST)	0
Erica Wiebe (CAN)	4
