= Wrestling at the 2020 Summer Olympics – Women's freestyle 76 kg =

Women's freestyle 76 kg at the Games of the XXXII Olympiad
- Venue: Makuhari Messe
- Date: 1–2 August 2021
- Competitors: 16 from 16 nations

Medalists
1st place, gold medalist(s)		Aline Rotter-Focken	Germany
2nd place, silver medalist(s)		Adeline Gray	United States
3rd place, bronze medalist(s)		Yasemin Adar	Turkey
3rd place, bronze medalist(s)		Zhou Qian	China

The women's freestyle 76 kilograms competition at the 2020 Summer Olympics in Tokyo, Japan, took place on 1–2 August 2021 at the Makuhari Messe in Mihama-ku.

This freestyle wrestling competition consists of a single-elimination tournament, with a repechage used to determine the winner of two bronze medals. The two finalists face off for gold and silver medals. Each wrestler who loses to one of the two finalists moves into the repechage, culminating in a pair of bronze medal matches featuring the semifinal losers each facing the remaining repechage opponent from their half of the bracket.

== Schedule ==
All times are Japan Standard Time (UTC+09:00)

Date	Time	Event
1 August 2021	11:00	Qualification rounds
1 August 2021	18:15	Semifinals
2 August 2021	11:00	Repechage
2 August 2021	19:30	Finals

== Results ==
Legend

- F — Won by fall

=== Main bracket ===
1/8 finals
Adeline Gray (USA)	8^{F}
Zaineb Sghaier (TUN)	0
Aline Ferreira (BRA)	0
Yasemin Adar (TUR)	6
Natalia Vorobieva (ROC)	16
Samar Amer (EGY)	12
Aiperi Medet Kyzy (KGZ)	8
Elmira Syzdykova (KAZ)	1
Hiroe Minagawa (JPN)	8
Ochirbatyn Burmaa (MGL)	0
Erica Wiebe (CAN)	4
Epp Mäe (EST)	5
Zhou Qian (CHN)	4
Alla Belinska (UKR)	3
Vasilisa Marzaliuk (BLR)	1
Aline Rotter-Focken (GER)	2

1/4 finals
Adeline Gray (USA)	6
Yasemin Adar (TUR)	4
Natalia Vorobieva (ROC)	0
Aiperi Medet Kyzy (KGZ)	12
Hiroe Minagawa (JPN)	3
Epp Mäe (EST)	0
Zhou Qian (CHN)	3
Aline Rotter-Focken (GER)	8

Semifinals
Adeline Gray (USA)	3
Aiperi Medet Kyzy (KGZ)	2
Hiroe Minagawa (JPN)	1
Aline Rotter-Focken (GER)	3

Final
Adeline Gray (USA)	3
Aline Rotter-Focken (GER)	7

=== Repechage ===
Repechage
Zaineb Sghaier (TUN)	0
Yasemin Adar (TUR)	2^{F}
Vasilisa Marzaliuk (BLR)	1
Zhou Qian (CHN)	2

Bronze medal matches
Yasemin Adar (TUR)	4^{F}
Aiperi Medet Kyzy (KGZ)	0
Zhou Qian (CHN)	2^{F}
Hiroe Minagawa (JPN)	0

== Final standing ==
Rank	Athlete
1st place, gold medalist(s)	Aline Rotter-Focken (GER)
2nd place, silver medalist(s)	Adeline Gray (USA)
3rd place, bronze medalist(s)	Yasemin Adar (TUR)
3rd place, bronze medalist(s)	Zhou Qian (CHN)
5	Aiperi Medet Kyzy (KGZ)
5	Hiroe Minagawa (JPN)
7	Natalia Vorobieva (ROC)
8	Epp Mäe (EST)
9	Vasilisa Marzaliuk (BLR)
10	Samar Amer (EGY)
11	Erica Wiebe (CAN)
12	Alla Belinska (UKR)
13	Elmira Syzdykova (KAZ)
14	Aline Ferreira (BRA)
15	Ochirbatyn Burmaa (MGL)
16	Zaineb Sghaier (TUN)
