= Wrestling at the 2016 Summer Olympics – Women's freestyle 75 kg =

Women's freestyle 75 kg at the Games of the XXXI Olympiad
- Venue: Carioca Arena 2
- Date: 18 August 2016
- Competitors: 18 from 18 nations

Medalists
1st place, gold medalist(s)		Erica Wiebe	Canada
2nd place, silver medalist(s)		Guzel Manyurova	Kazakhstan
3rd place, bronze medalist(s)		Zhang Fengliu	China
3rd place, bronze medalist(s)		Ekaterina Bukina	Russia

Women's freestyle 75 kilograms competition at the 2016 Summer Olympics in Rio de Janeiro, Brazil, took place on August 18 at the Carioca Arena 2 in Barra da Tijuca.

This freestyle wrestling competition consists of a single-elimination tournament, with a repechage used to determine the winner of two bronze medals. The two finalists face off for gold and silver medals. Each wrestler who loses to one of the two finalists moves into the repechage, culminating in a pair of bronze medal matches featuring the semifinal losers each facing the remaining repechage opponent from their half of the bracket.

== Schedule ==
All times are Brasília Standard Time (UTC−03:00)

Date	Time	Event
18 August 2016	10:00	Qualification rounds
18 August 2016	16:00	Repechage
18 August 2016	17:00	Finals

== Results ==
Legend

- F — Won by fall

=== Final ===
Final
Erica Wiebe (CAN)	6
Guzel Manyurova (KAZ)	0

=== Top half ===
Qualifications

1/8 finals
Adeline Gray (USA)	4^{F}
Andrea Olaya (COL)	0
Vasilisa Marzaliuk (BLR)	5^{F}
Cynthia Vescan (FRA)	0
Erica Wiebe (CAN)	5
Maria Selmaier (GER)	0
Zhang Fengliu (CHN)	6
Epp Mäe (EST)	4

1/4 finals
Adeline Gray (USA)	1
Vasilisa Marzaliuk (BLR)	4
Erica Wiebe (CAN)	5
Zhang Fengliu (CHN)	2

Semifinals
Vasilisa Marzaliuk (BLR)	0
Erica Wiebe (CAN)	3

=== Bottom half ===
Qualifications
Ekaterina Bukina (RUS)	4
Samar Amer (EGY)	4
Alla Cherkasova (UKR)	10
Yasemin Adar (TUR)	12

1/8 finals
Annabelle Ali (CMR)	6
Jaramit Weffer (VEN)	0
Zsanett Németh (HUN)	2
Guzel Manyurova (KAZ)	12
Aline Ferreira (BRA)	4
Rio Watari (JPN)	3
Ekaterina Bukina (RUS)	5
Yasemin Adar (TUR)	3

1/4 finals
Annabelle Ali (CMR)	6
Guzel Manyurova (KAZ)	8
Aline Ferreira (BRA)	3
Ekaterina Bukina (RUS)	4

Semifinals
Guzel Manyurova (KAZ)	6^{F}
Ekaterina Bukina (RUS)	8

=== Repechage ===
Repechage round 2
Maria Selmaier (GER)	0
Zhang Fengliu (CHN)	10
Zsanett Németh (HUN)	2
Annabelle Ali (CMR)	5

Bronze medals
Zhang Fengliu (CHN)	8
Vasilisa Marzaliuk (BLR)	4
Annabelle Ali (CMR)	3
Ekaterina Bukina (RUS)	5

== Final standing ==
Rank	Athlete
1st place, gold medalist(s)	Erica Wiebe (CAN)
2nd place, silver medalist(s)	Guzel Manyurova (KAZ)
3rd place, bronze medalist(s)	Zhang Fengliu (CHN)
3rd place, bronze medalist(s)	Ekaterina Bukina (RUS)
5	Vasilisa Marzaliuk (BLR)
5	Annabelle Ali (CMR)
7	Adeline Gray (USA)
8	Yasemin Adar (TUR)
9	Aline Ferreira (BRA)
10	Zsanett Németh (HUN)
11	Alla Cherkasova (UKR)
12	Samar Amer (EGY)
13	Epp Mäe (EST)
14	Rio Watari (JPN)
15	Andrea Olaya (COL)
16	Cynthia Vescan (FRA)
17	Jaramit Weffer (VEN)
18	Maria Selmaier (GER)
