= 2015 World Wrestling Championships – Women's freestyle 75 kg =

Women's freestyle 75 kg at the 2015 World Championships
- Venue: Orleans Arena
- Dates: 10 September 2015
- Competitors: 24 from 24 nations

Medalists
gold medal	Adeline Gray	United States
silver medal	Zhou Qian	China
bronze medal	Epp Mäe	Estonia
bronze medal	Vasilisa Marzaliuk	Belarus

The women's freestyle 75 kilograms was a competition featured at the 2015 World Wrestling Championships, and was held in Las Vegas, United States on 10 September 2015.

This freestyle wrestling competition consisted of a single-elimination tournament, with a repechage used to determine the winners of two bronze medals.

== Results ==
Legend

- F — Won by fall

=== Final ===
Final
Zhou Qian (CHN)	2
Adeline Gray (USA)	13

=== Top half ===
Round of 32

Round of 16
Andrea Olaya (COL)	8^{F}
Nadia Antar (EGY)	5
Yasemin Adar (TUR)	6^{F}
Maider Unda (ESP)	0
Nikki Jatain (IND)	0
Chiaki Iijima (JPN)	7
Epp Mäe (EST)	1
Zhou Qian (CHN)	6

Quarterfinals
Andrea Olaya (COL)	6^{F}
Yasemin Adar (TUR)	7
Chiaki Iijima (JPN)	0
Zhou Qian (CHN)	10

Semifinals
Andrea Olaya (COL)	2
Zhou Qian (CHN)	4

=== Bottom half ===
Round of 32
Zsanett Németh (HUN)	0
Guzel Manyurova (KAZ)	6^{F}
Aline Ferreira (BRA)	6
Lisset Hechavarría (CUB)	1
Jaramit Weffer (VEN)	5
Oksana Vashchuk (UKR)	10
Dayana Ivanova (BUL)	0
Ekaterina Bukina (RUS)	11
Vasilisa Marzaliuk (BLR)	5
Justina Di Stasio (CAN)	0
Adeline Gray (USA)	10
Gelegjamtsyn Naranchimeg (MGL)	0
Francy Rädelt (GER)	0
Svetlana Saenko (MDA)	10
Daria Osocka (POL)	13^{F}
Hwang Eun-ju (KOR)	2

Round of 16
Guzel Manyurova (KAZ)	5
Aline Ferreira (BRA)	7
Oksana Vashchuk (UKR)	2
Ekaterina Bukina (RUS)	6^{F}
Vasilisa Marzaliuk (BLR)	0
Adeline Gray (USA)	6
Svetlana Saenko (MDA)	6
Daria Osocka (POL)	7

Quarterfinals
Aline Ferreira (BRA)	5
Ekaterina Bukina (RUS)	4
Adeline Gray (USA)	10
Daria Osocka (POL)	0

Semifinals
Aline Ferreira (BRA)	2
Adeline Gray (USA)	10

=== Repechage ===
Repechage round 1
Gelegjamtsyn Naranchimeg (MGL)	3
Vasilisa Marzaliuk (BLR)	3

Repechage round 2
Epp Mäe (EST)	4
Chiaki Iijima (JPN)	0
Vasilisa Marzaliuk (BLR)	8^{F}
Daria Osocka (POL)	0

Bronze medals
Epp Mäe (EST)	8
Andrea Olaya (COL)	2
Vasilisa Marzaliuk (BLR)	5
Aline Ferreira (BRA)	1
