= 2014 World Wrestling Championships – Women's freestyle 75 kg =

Women's freestyle 75 kg at the 2014 World Championships
- Venue: Gymnastics Sport Palace
- Dates: 11 September 2014
- Competitors: 19 from 19 nations

Medalists
gold medal	Adeline Gray	United States
silver medal	Aline Ferreira	Brazil
bronze medal	Ochirbatyn Burmaa	Mongolia
bronze medal	Zhou Qian	China

The women's freestyle 75 kilograms is a competition featured at the 2014 World Wrestling Championships, and was held in Tashkent, Uzbekistan on 11 September 2014.

This freestyle wrestling competition consisted of a single-elimination tournament, with a repechage used to determine the winners of two bronze medals.

== Results ==
Legend

- F — Won by fall

=== Final ===
Final
Aline Ferreira (BRA)	1
Adeline Gray (USA)	2

=== Top half ===
Round of 32

Round of 16
Andrea Olaya (COL)	10^{F}
Nadia Antar (EGY)	12
Aline Ferreira (BRA)	6^{F}
Gulmira Ismatova (UZB)	0
Stanka Zlateva (BUL)	2^{F}
Anshu Tomar (IND)	0
Kateryna Burmistrova (UKR)	0
Ochirbatyn Burmaa (MGL)	5

Quarterfinals
Andrea Olaya (COL)	0
Aline Ferreira (BRA)	7
Stanka Zlateva (BUL)	3
Ochirbatyn Burmaa (MGL)	6

Semifinals
Aline Ferreira (BRA)	5
Ochirbatyn Burmaa (MGL)	2

=== Bottom half ===
Round of 32
Hiroe Suzuki (JPN)	3
Vasilisa Marzaliuk (BLR)	1
Yasemin Adar (TUR)	10
Ekaterina Bukina (RUS)	0
Zhou Qian (CHN)	10
Adeline Gray (USA)	11

Round of 16
Zsanett Németh (HUN)	0
Epp Mäe (EST)	5
Gulmaral Yerkebayeva (KAZ)	0
Erica Wiebe (CAN)	8
Maria Selmaier (GER)	0
Hiroe Suzuki (JPN)	7
Yasemin Adar (TUR)	6
Adeline Gray (USA)	13^{F}

Quarterfinals
Epp Mäe (EST)	7^{F}
Erica Wiebe (CAN)	2
Hiroe Suzuki (JPN)	1
Adeline Gray (USA)	2

Semifinals
Epp Mäe (EST)	1
Adeline Gray (USA)	5

=== Repechage ===
Repechage round 1
Zhou Qian (CHN)	18
Yasemin Adar (TUR)	6

Repechage round 2
Gulmira Ismatova (UZB)	0
Andrea Olaya (COL)	11
Zhou Qian (CHN)	11
Hiroe Suzuki (JPN)	0

Bronze medals
Andrea Olaya (COL)	0
Ochirbatyn Burmaa (MGL)	3
Zhou Qian (CHN)	7
Epp Mäe (EST)	1
