= Wrestling at the 2018 Asian Games – Women's freestyle 76 kg =

Women's freestyle 76 kg at the 2018 Asian Games
- Venue: Jakarta Convention Center
- Date: 21 August 2018
- Competitors: 9 from 9 nations

Medalists
gold medal	Zhou Qian	China
silver medal	Hiroe Minagawa	Japan
bronze medal	Elmira Syzdykova	Kazakhstan
bronze medal	Aiperi Medet Kyzy	Kyrgyzstan

The women's freestyle 76 kilograms wrestling competition at the 2018 Asian Games in Jakarta was held on 21 August 2018 at the Jakarta Convention Center Assembly Hall.

== Schedule ==
All times are Western Indonesia Time (UTC+07:00)

Date	Time	Event
Tuesday, 21 August 2018	13:00	1/8 finals
Tuesday, 21 August 2018	13:00	Quarterfinals
Tuesday, 21 August 2018	13:00	Semifinals
Tuesday, 21 August 2018	19:00	Finals

== Results ==
Legend

- F — Won by fall

=== Main bracket ===
1/8 finals
Ridha Wahdaniyaty Ridwan (INA)	0
Aiperi Medet Kyzy (KGZ)	12

Quarterfinals
Elmira Syzdykova (KAZ)	0
Zhou Qian (CHN)	10^{F}
Hwang Eun-ju (KOR)	4
Chang Hui-tsz (TPE)	4
Hiroe Minagawa (JPN)	13
Ochirbatyn Nasanburmaa (MGL)	1
Kiran Bishnoi (IND)	2
Aiperi Medet Kyzy (KGZ)	4

Semifinals
Zhou Qian (CHN)	10
Hwang Eun-ju (KOR)	0
Hiroe Minagawa (JPN)	2
Aiperi Medet Kyzy (KGZ)	1

Final
Zhou Qian (CHN)	8
Hiroe Minagawa (JPN)	0

=== Repechage ===
Bronze medals
Elmira Syzdykova (KAZ)	5
Hwang Eun-ju (KOR)	2
Ochirbatyn Nasanburmaa (MGL)	2
Aiperi Medet Kyzy (KGZ)	4

== Final standing ==
Rank	Athlete
1st place, gold medalist(s)	Zhou Qian (CHN)
2nd place, silver medalist(s)	Hiroe Minagawa (JPN)
3rd place, bronze medalist(s)	Elmira Syzdykova (KAZ)
3rd place, bronze medalist(s)	Aiperi Medet Kyzy (KGZ)
5	Hwang Eun-ju (KOR)
5	Ochirbatyn Nasanburmaa (MGL)
7	Chang Hui-tsz (TPE)
8	Kiran Bishnoi (IND)
9	Ridha Wahdaniyaty Ridwan (INA)
