= Wrestling at the 2015 Pan American Games – Women's freestyle 75 kg =

Women's Freestyle 75 kg at the 2015 Pan American Games
- Venue: Mississauga Sports Centre
- Dates: July 17
- Competitors: 8 from 8 nations

Medalists
Gold medal	Adeline Gray	United States
Silver medal	Justina Di Stasio	Canada
Bronze medal	Aline Ferreira	Brazil
Bronze medal	Lisset Hechavarria	Cuba

The women's freestyle 75 kg competition of the Wrestling events at the 2015 Pan American Games in Toronto were held on July 17 at the Mississauga Sports Centre.

== Schedule ==
All times are Eastern Daylight Time (UTC-4).

Date	Time	Round
July 17, 2015	15:20	Quarterfinals
July 17, 2015	16:32	Semifinals
July 17, 2015	21:03	Bronze medal matches
July 17, 2015	21:21	Final

== Results ==
Legend

- F — Won by fall

=== Final ===
Quarterfinals		Semifinals		Finals
Jaramit Weffer (VEN)	3
Justina Di Stasio (CAN)	5	Justina Di Stasio (CAN)	4
Andrea Olaya (COL)	0	Lisset Hechavarria (CUB)	4
Lisset Hechavarria (CUB)	7			Justina Di Stasio (CAN)	6
Cinthia Morales (MEX)	4			Adeline Gray (USA)	7
Ana Gonzalez (PUR)	2^{F}	Ana Gonzalez (PUR)	0
Adeline Gray (USA)	10	Adeline Gray (USA)	12
Aline Ferreira (BRA)	0

=== Repechage ===
Bronze medal match
Jaramit Weffer (VEN)	1
Lisset Hechavarria (CUB)	2
Aline Ferreira (BRA)	10^{F}
Ana Gonzalez (PUR)	1

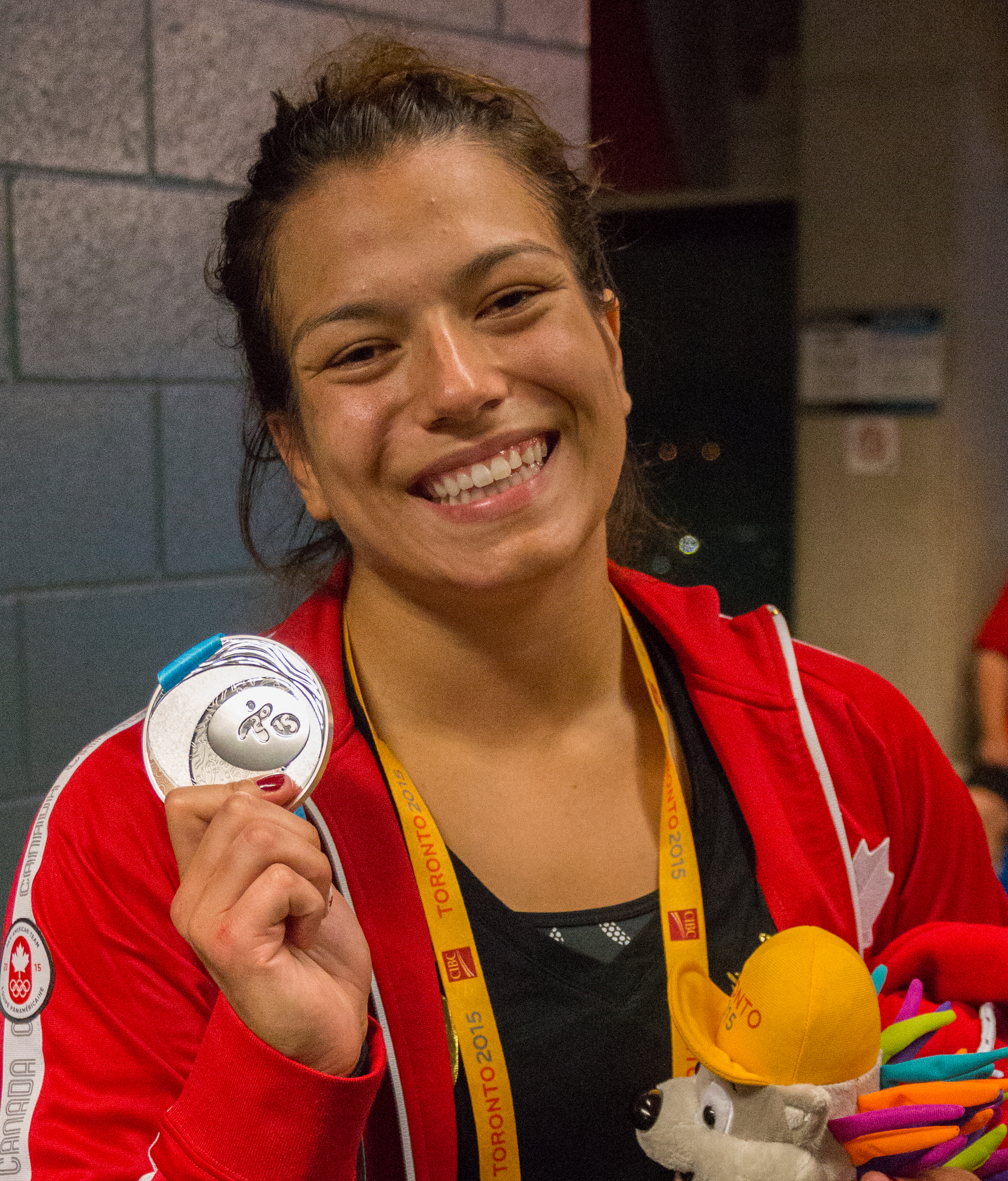
Justina Di Stasio, of Canada, wrestling silver medalist
