= 2007 World Wrestling Championships – Women's freestyle 67 kg =

Women's freestyle 67 kg at the 2007 World Championships
- Venue: Heydar Aliyev Sports and Concert Complex
- Dates: 23 September 2007
- Competitors: 17 from 17 nations

Medalists
gold medal	Jing Ruixue	China
silver medal	Martine Dugrenier	Canada
bronze medal	Natalia Kuksina	Russia
bronze medal	Katie Downing	United States

The women's freestyle 67 kilograms is a competition featured at the 2007 World Wrestling Championships, and was held at the Heydar Aliyev Sports and Concert Complex in Baku, Azerbaijan on 23 September 2007.

This freestyle wrestling competition consists of a single-elimination tournament, with a repechage used to determine the winner of two bronze medals.

== Results ==
Legend

- F — Won by fall

=== Final ===
Final
Martine Dugrenier (CAN)	1	0
Jing Ruixue (CHN)	2	1

=== Top half ===
Round of 32

Round of 16
Martine Dugrenier (CAN)	6	3
Caroline Lazzer (BRA)	0	0
Tsedendorjiin Bayarzayaa (MGL)	4	0	0
Darya Karpenko (KAZ)	2	1	1
Kateryna Burmistrova (UKR)	3^{F}
Maria Kachina (AZE)	0
Gunhild Fretland (NOR)	0	0
Natalia Kuksina (RUS)	2	4

Quarterfinals
Martine Dugrenier (CAN)	2	1
Darya Karpenko (KAZ)	0	0
Kateryna Burmistrova (UKR)	0	1	0
Natalia Kuksina (RUS)	1	0	1

Semifinals
Martine Dugrenier (CAN)	1	2
Natalia Kuksina (RUS)	1	0

=== Bottom half ===
Round of 32
Suman Kundu (IND)	1	0	2
Michala Spoustová (CZE)	0	4	0

Round of 16
Yoshiko Inoue (JPN)	0	3^{F}
Yoon So-young (KOR)	1	2
Kristīne Odriņa (LAT)	0	0
Jing Ruixue (CHN)	5	6
Katie Downing (USA)	1	2
Maria Müller (GER)	0	0
Hanna Beliayeva (BLR)	4^{F}
Suman Kundu (IND)	0

Quarterfinals
Yoshiko Inoue (JPN)	0	2
Jing Ruixue (CHN)	1	3
Katie Downing (USA)	1	1
Hanna Beliayeva (BLR)	0	0

Semifinals
Jing Ruixue (CHN)	2	2
Katie Downing (USA)	0	0

=== Repechage ===
Repechage round 2
Caroline Lazzer (BRA)	0	1
Darya Karpenko (KAZ)	2	1
Kristīne Odriņa (LAT)	0	0
Yoshiko Inoue (JPN)	3	4

Bronze medals
Darya Karpenko (KAZ)	0	0
Natalia Kuksina (RUS)	2	3
Yoshiko Inoue (JPN)	0	1	0
Katie Downing (USA)	1	1	1
