= 2021 European Wrestling Championships – Women's freestyle 76 kg =

Wrestling competition

The women's freestyle 76 kg is a competition featured at the 2021 European Wrestling Championships, and was held in Warsaw, Poland on April 21 and April 22.

== Medalists ==
Gold	Epp Mäe; Estonia
Silver	Natalia Vorobieva; Russia
Bronze	Cynthia Vescan; France
Bronze	Aline Rotter-Focken; Germany

== Results ==
Legend

- F — Won by fall

1/8 finals
Cynthia Vescan (FRA)	10
Mariya Oryashkova (BUL)	0
Ayşegül Özbege (TUR)	3
Patrycja Sperka (POL)	1
Kamilė Gaučaitė (LTU)	0
Natalia Vorobieva (RUS)	6^{F}
Aline Rotter-Focken (GER)	8^{F}
Enrica Rinaldi (ITA)	0
Vasilisa Marzaliuk (BLR)	5
Iselin Moen Solheim (NOR)	4
Zsanett Németh (HUN)	5
Anastasiia Osniach (UKR)	6

Quarterfinals
Epp Mäe (EST)	10
Sabira Aliyeva (AZE)	0
Cynthia Vescan (FRA)	8^{F}
Ayşegül Özbege (TUR)	0
Natalia Vorobieva (RUS)	3
Aline Rotter-Focken (GER)	1
Vasilisa Marzaliuk (BLR)	11
Anastasiia Osniach (UKR)	5

Semifinals
Epp Mäe (EST)	4
Cynthia Vescan (FRA)	0
Natalia Vorobieva (RUS)	6
Vasilisa Marzaliuk (BLR)	3

Final
Epp Mäe (EST)	1
Natalia Vorobieva (RUS)	1

Repechage round 1
Kamilė Gaučaitė (LTU)	0
Aline Rotter-Focken (GER)	10

Bronze medal match
Sabira Aliyeva (AZE)	0
Cynthia Vescan (FRA)	13
Aline Rotter-Focken (GER)	4
Vasilisa Marzaliuk (BLR)	0

== Final standing ==
Rank	Athlete
1st place, gold medalist(s)	Epp Mäe (EST)
2nd place, silver medalist(s)	Natalia Vorobieva (RUS)
3rd place, bronze medalist(s)	Cynthia Vescan (FRA)
3rd place, bronze medalist(s)	Aline Rotter-Focken (GER)
5	Sabira Aliyeva (AZE)
5	Vasilisa Marzaliuk (BLR)
7	Anastasiia Osniach (UKR)
8	Ayşegül Özbege (TUR)
9	Zsanett Németh (HUN)
10	Iselin Moen Solheim (NOR)
11	Patrycja Sperka (POL)
12	Enrica Rinaldi (ITA)
13	Mariya Oryashkova (BUL)
14	Kamilė Gaučaitė (LTU)
