= Erica Wiebe =

Canadian wrestler (born 1989)

Personal information
- Full name: Erica Elizabeth Wiebe
- Born: June 13, 1989 (age 37) Stittsville, Ontario, Canada
- Height: 175 cm (5 ft 9 in)
- Weight: 76 kg (168 lb)

Sport
- Country: Canada
- Sport: Wrestling
- Event: Freestyle
- University team: University of Calgary
- Retired: 2024
Medal record
Women's freestyle wrestling
Representing Canada
Olympic Games
Gold medal – first place	2016 Rio de Janeiro	75 kg
World Championships
Bronze medal – third place	2018 Budapest	76 kg
Commonwealth Games
Gold medal – first place	2014 Glasgow	75 kg
Gold medal – first place	2018 Gold Coast	76 kg
Golden Grand Prix Ivan Yarygin
Gold medal – first place	2015 Krasnoyarsk	75 kg
Summer Universiade
Bronze medal – third place	2013 Kazan	72 kg

Erica Elizabeth Wiebe (born June 13, 1989) is a Canadian retired wrestler. She won gold at the 2016 Summer Olympics in women's 75 kg freestyle. Wiebe was the third Canadian champion ever in wrestling at the Olympics, and second Canadian woman to win gold after Carol Huynh. Wiebe also won gold at two Commonwealth Games: the 2014 Commonwealth Games in Glasgow and the 2018 Commonwealth Games on the Gold Coast.

== Career ==
Wiebe started wrestling in grade 9 when she saw a sign posted for co-ed wrestling at her school, Sacred Heart High School in Stittsville, Ontario. She travelled as part of Canada's extended team for the 2012 Summer Olympics. There she was the training partner for Leah Callahan in London. At the 2013 World University Games Wiebe won a bronze medal in the women's 72 kg freestyle weight class.

She had an incredibly successful 2014 season when she won every individual tournament she entered, a streak of 36 matches. She won a gold medal in the 75 kg freestyle at the 2014 Commonwealth Games in Glasgow. Celebrating her win after the bout she said "When I won it was emotional. This is what I have been thinking about and dreaming about. It was awesome to have that moment for myself, the first time that I did this at a big event. I have never had my anthem played so I was thinking about that before I went out there and that is what I was wrestling for today." Wiebe would also win gold at the 2015 World University Games. At the esteemed 2015 Golden Grand Prix Ivan Yarygin she won the gold medal in her weight class. Despite the run of successes, Wiebe did not compete for Canada on home soil at the 2015 Pan American Games.

The summer of 2016 saw Wiebe compete as part of Canada's 2016 Olympic team. In competition at the Olympics, she won gold, defeating Guzel Manyurova in the final event. After winning the Olympic title she said "I love this sport and I never thought I'd be an Olympic champion, but today I had my best day. It's amazing." The medal was the third gold medal in wrestling that Canada has ever won at the Olympics, and second ever women's gold. She follows in the footsteps of Daniel Igali who won gold at the 2000 Summer Olympics, and Carol Huynh who won the first for Canadian women at the 2008 Summer Olympics.

Following her gold in Rio, Wiebe began wrestling in the Indian Pro Wrestling League where she was the captain of the Mumbai Maharathi. Wiebe's salary in the league is 4.3 million Indian rupees, which equates to more than $80,000 Canadian dollars, this makes her one of the highest paid wrestlers in the world. The event ran from January 2–19, 2017, where Wiebe wrestled to a perfect 3-0 in her bouts with the Maharathi, though the team's overall record was 1-2.

In 2021, she won the gold medal in the 76 kg event at the Matteo Pellicone Ranking Series 2021 held in Rome, Italy. She also won one of the bronze medals in her event at the 2021 Poland Open held in Warsaw, Poland.

Upon her retirement in 2024, Wiebe was working for the Canadian Olympic Committee, as Manager of Athlete Relations, Safe Sport and DEI. She has also been a broadcast commentator for wrestling, first at the Senior Asian Championships in 2023 and then the Senior World Championships, as well as other events.

== Education ==
Erica Wiebe completed her secondary school education at Sacred Heart High School then she continued on to the university level where Wiebe graduated for the University of Calgary with Bachelors of Arts (Honors) and she also earned a joint MBA from Queens University and Cornell University .

== International matches ==
Res.	Record	Opponent	Score	Date	Event	Location
2018 World Bronze Medallist
Win	17-4	(Estonia) Epp Mäe	4-0	October 24, 2018	2018 World Championships	(Hungary) Budapest
Loss	16-4	(United States) Adeline Gray	1-3	October 23, 2018	2018 World Championships	(Hungary) Budapest
Win	16-3	(Germany) Aline Focken	6-4	October 23, 2018	2018 World Championships	(Hungary) Budapest
Win	15-3	(China) Paliha	3-0	October 23, 2018	2018 World Championships	(Hungary) Budapest
2018 Commonwealth Games champion
Win	14-3	(Nigeria) Blessing Onyebuchi	Fall	April 12, 2018	2018 Commonwealth Games	(Australia) Gold Coast
Win	13-3	(England) Georgina Nelthorpe	Tech Fall (11-0)	April 12, 2018	2018 Commonwealth Games	(Australia) Gold Coast
Win	12-3	(Sierra Leone) Hajaratu Kamara	Fall	April 12, 2018	2018 Commonwealth Games	(Australia) Gold Coast
2016 Olympic champion
Win	11-3	(Kazakhstan) Guzel Manyurova	6-0	August 18, 2016	2016 Summer Olympics	(Brazil) Rio de Janeiro
Win	10-3	(Belarus) Vasilisa Marzaliuk	3-0	August 18, 2016	2016 Summer Olympics	(Brazil) Rio de Janeiro
Win	9-3	(China) Zhang Fengliu	5-2	August 18, 2016	2016 Summer Olympics	(Brazil) Rio de Janeiro
Win	8-3	(Estonia) Epp Mäe	6-4	August 18, 2016	2016 Summer Olympics	(Brazil) Rio de Janeiro
at 2014 World Championships
Loss	7-3	(Estonia) Epp Mäe	Fall	September 11, 2014	2014 World Championship	(Uzbekistan) Tashkent
Win	7-2	(Kazakhstan) Gulmaral Yerkebayeva	8-0	September 11, 2014	2014 World Championship	(Uzbekistan) Tashkent
2014 Commonwealth Games champion
Win	6-2	(Cameroon) Annabelle Ali	4-2	April 29, 2014	2014 Commonwealth Games	(United Kingdom) Glasgow
Win	5-2	(India) Jyoti	9-0	April 29, 2014	2014 Commonwealth Games	(United Kingdom) Glasgow
Win	4-2	(Nigeria) Blessing Onyebuchi	Tech Fall (10-0)	April 29, 2014	2014 Commonwealth Games	(United Kingdom) Glasgow
Win	3-2	(England) Sophie Edwards	Tech Fall (10-0)	April 29, 2014	2014 Commonwealth Games	(United Kingdom) Glasgow
at 2013 World Championships
Loss	2-2	(Mongolia) Ochirbatyn Burmaa	3-5	September 20, 2013	2013 World Championship	(Hungary) Budapest
Loss	2-1	(Russia) Natalia Vorobieva	Fall	September 20, 2013	2013 World Championship	(Hungary) Budapest
Win	2-0	(Sweden) Jenny Fransson	Fall	September 20, 2013	2013 World Championship	(Hungary) Budapest
Win	1-0	(Cuba) Lisset Hechavarría	7-0	September 20, 2013	2013 World Championship	(Hungary) Budapest

Wiebe was named flag-bearer for the closing ceremony of the 2018 Commonwealth Games in Gold Coast, Australia.
