= 2012 World Wrestling Championships – Women's freestyle 67 kg =

Women's freestyle 67 kg at the 2012 World Championships
- Venue: Millennium Place
- Dates: 27 September 2012
- Competitors: 16 from 16 nations

Medalists
gold medal	Adeline Gray	United States
silver medal	Dorothy Yeats	Canada
bronze medal	Hong Yan	China
bronze medal	Yoshiko Inoue	Japan

The women's freestyle 67 kilograms is a competition featured at the 2012 World Wrestling Championships, and was held at the Millennium Place in Strathcona County, Alberta, Canada on 27 September 2012.

This freestyle wrestling competition consisted of a single-elimination tournament, with a repechage used to determine the winners of two bronze medals. The two finalists faced off for gold and silver medals. Each wrestler who lost to one of the two finalists moved into the repechage, culminating in a pair of bronze medal matches featuring the semifinal losers each facing the remaining repechage opponent from their half of the bracket.

Each bout consisted of up to three rounds, lasting two minutes apiece. The wrestler who scored more points in each round was the winner of that rounds; the bout finished when one wrestler had won two rounds (and thus the match).

Adeline Gray of the United States won the gold medal.

== Results ==
Legend

- F — Won by fall

=== Main bracket ===
Round of 16
Tsedendorjiin Bayarzayaa (MGL)	0	1
Irina Bogdanova (RUS)	1	2
Laura Skujiņa (LAT)	2	0
Alina Stadnyk (UKR)	4	1
Nadya Sementsova (AZE)	1	1
Henna Johansson (SWE)	0	0
Hong Yan (CHN)	2	0	0
Dorothy Yeats (CAN)	1	1	1
Burcu Örskaya (TUR)	0	1	0
Navjot Kaur (IND)	1	0	1
Ilana Kratysh (ISR)	4	0	0
Darya Khamdiyeva (KAZ)	0	8	1
Iryna Shautsova (BLR)	0	0
Yoshiko Inoue (JPN)	1	7
Adeline Gray (USA)	3	2
Dzhanan Manolova (BUL)	0	0

Quarterfinals
Irina Bogdanova (RUS)	0	0
Alina Stadnyk (UKR)	2	1
Nadya Sementsova (AZE)	0	2
Dorothy Yeats (CAN)	1	5
Navjot Kaur (IND)	1	0	1
Darya Khamdiyeva (KAZ)	0	7	0
Yoshiko Inoue (JPN)	1	0
Adeline Gray (USA)	1	3

Semifinals
Alina Stadnyk (UKR)	0	0
Dorothy Yeats (CAN)	1	2
Navjot Kaur (IND)	0
Adeline Gray (USA)	6^{F}

Final
Dorothy Yeats (CAN)	0	0
Adeline Gray (USA)	4	4^{F}

=== Repechage ===
Repechage round 1
Hong Yan (CHN)	1	1	5^{F}
Nadya Sementsova (AZE)	0	1	0
Dzhanan Manolova (BUL)	0	0
Yoshiko Inoue (JPN)	1	6

Bronze medals
Hong Yan (CHN)	2	5
Alina Stadnyk (UKR)	1	2
Yoshiko Inoue (JPN)	1	3
Navjot Kaur (IND)	0	0
