= Wrestling at the 2022 Asian Games – Women's freestyle 76 kg =

Women's freestyle 76 kg at the 2022 Asian Games
- Venue: Lin'an Sports and Culture Centre
- Date: 6 October 2023
- Competitors: 11 from 11 nations

Medalists
gold medal	Aiperi Medet Kyzy	Kyrgyzstan
silver medal	Zhamila Bakbergenova	Kazakhstan
bronze medal	Wang Juan	China
bronze medal	Kiran Bishnoi	India

The women's freestyle 76 kilograms wrestling competition at the 2022 Asian Games in Hangzhou was held on 5 October 2023 at the Lin'an Sports and Culture Centre.

This freestyle wrestling competition consists of a single-elimination tournament, with a repechage used to determine the winner of two bronze medals. The two finalists face off for gold and silver medals. Each wrestler who loses to one of the two finalists moves into the repechage, culminating in a pair of bronze medal matches featuring the semifinal losers each facing the remaining repechage opponent from their half of the bracket.

== Schedule ==
All times are China Standard Time (UTC+08:00)

Date	Time	Event
Friday, 6 October 2023	10:00	1/8 finals
Friday, 6 October 2023	10:00	1/4 finals
Friday, 6 October 2023	10:00	Semifinals
Friday, 6 October 2023	10:00	Repechages
Friday, 6 October 2023	17:00	Finals

== Results ==
Legend

- F — Won by fall

=== Main bracket ===
1/8 finals
Wang Juan (CHN)	1
Aiperi Medet Kyzy (KGZ)	2
Nodoka Yamamoto (JPN)	2
Varadisa Septi (INA)	0
Svetlana Oknazarova (UZB)	0
Zhamila Bakbergenova (KAZ)	7^{F}

1/4 finals
Đặng Thị Linh (VIE)	0
Aiperi Medet Kyzy (KGZ)	8^{F}
Jeong Seo-yeon (KOR)	0
Chang Hui-tsz (TPE)	8^{F}
Kiran Bishnoi (IND)	3
Nodoka Yamamoto (JPN)	0
Zhamila Bakbergenova (KAZ)	6^{F}
Ganbatyn Ariunjargal (MGL)	0

Semifinals
Aiperi Medet Kyzy (KGZ)	8
Chang Hui-tsz (TPE)	0
Kiran Bishnoi (IND)	2
Zhamila Bakbergenova (KAZ)	4^{F}

Gold medal match
Aiperi Medet Kyzy (KGZ)	7
Zhamila Bakbergenova (KAZ)	4

=== Repechage ===
Repechage round 1
Wang Juan (CHN)	11
Đặng Thị Linh (VIE)	0
Svetlana Oknazarova (UZB)	2
Ganbatyn Ariunjargal (MGL)	14^{F}

Bronze medal matches
Wang Juan (CHN)	6
Chang Hui-tsz (TPE)	0
Ganbatyn Ariunjargal (MGL)	3
Kiran Bishnoi (IND)	6

== Final standing ==
Rank	Athlete
1st place, gold medalist(s)	Aiperi Medet Kyzy (KGZ)
2nd place, silver medalist(s)	Zhamila Bakbergenova (KAZ)
3rd place, bronze medalist(s)	Wang Juan (CHN)
3rd place, bronze medalist(s)	Kiran Bishnoi (IND)
5	Chang Hui-tsz (TPE)
5	Ganbatyn Ariunjargal (MGL)
7	Nodoka Yamamoto (JPN)
8	Svetlana Oknazarova (UZB)
9	Varadisa Septi (INA)
10	Jeong Seo-yeon (KOR)
11	Đặng Thị Linh (VIE)
