= Chang Hui-tsz =

Taiwanese freestyle wrestler

Personal information
- Born: 23 April 1999 (age 27)

Sport
- Country: Chinese Taipei
- Sport: Amateur wrestling
- Weight class: 76 kg
- Event: Freestyle
Medal record
Representing Chinese Taipei
Women's freestyle wrestling
Asian Championships
Bronze medal – third place	2019 Xi'an	76 kg
Bronze medal – third place	2024 Bishkek	76 kg
Asian U23 Championship
Gold medal – first place	2019 Ulaanbaatar	76 kg
Women's beach wrestling
Asian Beach Games
Silver medal – second place	2016 Da Nang	+70 kg

Chang Hui-tsz (born 23 April 1999) is a Taiwanese freestyle wrestler. She won one of the bronze medals in the women's 76 kg event at the 2019 Asian Wrestling Championships held in Xi'an, China. She also won a bronze medal at the 2024 Asian Wrestling Championships held in Bishkek, Kyrgyzstan.

== Career ==
At the 2017 Asian Indoor and Martial Arts Games held in Ashgabat, Turkmenistan, Chang competed in the 75 kg event without winning a medal. She was eliminated in her first match.

Chang represented Chinese Taipei at the 2018 Asian Games held in Jakarta, Indonesia. She competed in the women's 76 kg event without winning a medal. She was eliminated in her first match by Hwang Eun-ju of South Korea. In the same year, she also competed in the women's 76 kg event at the 2018 World Wrestling Championships held in Budapest, Hungary. In this competition she was eliminated in her first match by Kiran Bishnoi of India.

In 2019, Chang won the gold medal in the 76 kg event at the Asian U23 Wrestling Championship held in Ulaanbaatar, Mongolia. In the same year, she also competed in the women's 76 kg event at the 2019 World Wrestling Championships in Nur-Sultan, Kazakhstan without winning a medal.

Chang competed in the women's 76 kg event at the 2022 U23 World Wrestling Championships held in Pontevedra, Spain. In 2023, she lost her bronze medal match in the women's 76 kg event at the 2022 Asian Games held in Hangzhou, China.

Chang won one of the bronze medals in her event at the 2024 Asian Wrestling Championships held in Bishkek, Kyrgyzstan. She competed at the 2024 Asian Wrestling Olympic Qualification Tournament in Bishkek, Kyrgyzstan hoping to qualify for the 2024 Summer Olympics in Paris, France. She was eliminated in her third match and she did not qualify for the Olympics. Chang also competed at the 2024 World Wrestling Olympic Qualification Tournament held in Istanbul, Turkey without qualifying for the Olympics. She was eliminated in her first match.

== Achievements ==
Year	Tournament	Location	Result	Event
2019	Asian Championships	Xi'an, China	3rd	Freestyle 76 kg
2024	Asian Championships	Bishkek, Kyrgyzstan	3rd	Freestyle 76 kg
