= Wrestling at the 2010 Asian Games – Women's freestyle 72 kg =

Women's freestyle 72 kg at the 2010 Asian Games
- Venue: Huagong Gymnasium
- Date: 26 November 2010
- Competitors: 8 from 8 nations

Medalists
gold medal	Gelegjamtsyn Naranchimeg	Mongolia
silver medal	Li Dan	China
bronze medal	Kyoko Hamaguchi	Japan
bronze medal	Guzel Manyurova	Kazakhstan

The women's freestyle 72 kilograms wrestling competition at the 2010 Asian Games in Guangzhou was held on 26 November 2010 at the Huagong Gymnasium.

This freestyle wrestling competition consisted of a single-elimination tournament, with a repechage used to determine the winner of two bronze medals. The two finalists faced off for gold and silver medals. Each wrestler who lost to one of the two finalists moved into the repechage, culminating in a pair of bronze medal matches featuring the semifinal losers each facing the remaining repechage opponent from their half of the bracket.

Each bout consisted of up to three rounds, lasting two minutes apiece. The wrestler who scored more points in each round was the winner of that rounds; the bout finished when one wrestler had won two rounds (and thus the match).

== Schedule ==
All times are China Standard Time (UTC+08:00)

Date	Time	Event
Friday, 26 November 2010	09:30	Quarterfinals
Friday, 26 November 2010	09:30	Semifinals
Friday, 26 November 2010	17:00	Finals

== Results ==
Legend

- F — Won by fall

=== Main bracket ===
Quarterfinals
Yana Panova (KGZ)	0
Kyoko Hamaguchi (JPN)	6^{F}
Li Dan (CHN)	2	6
Bae Mi-kyung (KOR)	0	0
Gursharan Preet Kaur (IND)	0	0
Guzel Manyurova (KAZ)	3	4^{F}
Trần Thị Hoa (VIE)	0	0
Gelegjamtsyn Naranchimeg (MGL)	6	5^{F}

Semifinals
Kyoko Hamaguchi (JPN)	1
Li Dan (CHN)	4^{F}
Guzel Manyurova (KAZ)	1	2	2
Gelegjamtsyn Naranchimeg (MGL)	4	0	4

Final
Li Dan (CHN)	0	3
Gelegjamtsyn Naranchimeg (MGL)	4	6

=== Repechage ===
Bronze medals
Bae Mi-kyung (KOR)	0	0
Kyoko Hamaguchi (JPN)	4	6^{F}
Trần Thị Hoa (VIE)	0
Guzel Manyurova (KAZ)	4^{F}

== Final standing ==
Rank	Athlete
1st place, gold medalist(s)	Gelegjamtsyn Naranchimeg (MGL)
2nd place, silver medalist(s)	Li Dan (CHN)
3rd place, bronze medalist(s)	Kyoko Hamaguchi (JPN)
3rd place, bronze medalist(s)	Guzel Manyurova (KAZ)
5	Bae Mi-kyung (KOR)
5	Trần Thị Hoa (VIE)
7	Yana Panova (KGZ)
8	Gursharan Preet Kaur (IND)
