= 2021 World Wrestling Championships – Women's freestyle 76 kg =

Wrestling competitions

Women's freestyle 76 kg at the 2021 World Championships
- Venue: Nye Jordal Amfi
- Dates: 5–6 October 2021
- Competitors: 18 from 18 nations

Medalists
gold medal	Adeline Gray	United States
silver medal	Epp Mäe	Estonia
bronze medal	Samar Amer	Egypt
bronze medal	Aiperi Medet Kyzy	Kyrgyzstan

The women's freestyle 76 kilograms is a competition featured at the 2021 World Wrestling Championships, and was held in Oslo, Norway on 5 and 6 October.

This freestyle wrestling competition consists of a single-elimination tournament, with a repechage used to determine the winner of two bronze medals. The two finalists face off for gold and silver medals. Each wrestler who loses to one of the two finalists moves into the repechage, culminating in a pair of bronze medal matches featuring the semifinal losers each facing the remaining repechage opponent from their half of the bracket.

== Results ==
Legend

- C — Won by 3 cautions given to the opponent
- F — Won by fall

=== Final ===
Final
Adeline Gray (USA)	6^{F}
Epp Mäe (EST)	4

=== Top half ===
Round of 32

Round of 16
Adeline Gray (USA)	4^{F}
Ayşegül Özbege (TUR)	0
Kim Cho-lee (KOR)	0
Kiran Bishnoi (IND)	6
Yasuha Matsuyuki (JPN)	5
Zsanett Németh (HUN)	2
Samar Amer (EGY)	3
Elmira Syzdykova (KAZ)	2

Quarterfinals
Adeline Gray (USA)	5^{F}
Kiran Bishnoi (IND)	0
Yasuha Matsuyuki (JPN)	2
Samar Amer (EGY)	4

Semifinals
Adeline Gray (USA)	11^{F}
Samar Amer (EGY)	1

=== Bottom half ===
Round of 32
Kamilė Gaučaitė (LTU)	0
Naigalsürengiin Zagardulam (MGL)	4
Anastasiia Osniach (UKR)	14^{F}
Iselin Moen Solheim (NOR)	2

Round of 16
Aiperi Medet Kyzy (KGZ)	10
Mariya Oryashkova (BUL)	0
Marina Surovtseva (RWF)	7
Georgina Nelthorpe (GBR)	0
Francy Rädelt (GER)	11
Naigalsürengiin Zagardulam (MGL)	14^{C}
Anastasiia Osniach (UKR)	0
Epp Mäe (EST)	12

Quarterfinals
Aiperi Medet Kyzy (KGZ)	10
Marina Surovtseva (RWF)	0
Naigalsürengiin Zagardulam (MGL)	2
Epp Mäe (EST)	12

Semifinals
Aiperi Medet Kyzy (KGZ)	3
Epp Mäe (EST)	3

=== Repechage ===
Repechage round 2
Ayşegül Özbege (TUR)	0
Kiran Bishnoi (IND)	2
Anastasiia Osniach (UKR)	4^{F}
Naigalsürengiin Zagardulam (MGL)	5

Bronze medals
Kiran Bishnoi (IND)	1
Samar Amer (EGY)	2
Anastasiia Osniach (UKR)	1
Aiperi Medet Kyzy (KGZ)	12

== Final standing ==
Rank	Athlete
1st place, gold medalist(s)	Adeline Gray (USA)
2nd place, silver medalist(s)	Epp Mäe (EST)
3rd place, bronze medalist(s)	Samar Amer (EGY)
3rd place, bronze medalist(s)	Aiperi Medet Kyzy (KGZ)
5	Kiran Bishnoi (IND)
5	Anastasiia Osniach (UKR)
7	Naigalsürengiin Zagardulam (MGL)
8	Yasuha Matsuyuki (JPN)
9	Marina Surovtseva (RWF)
10	Elmira Syzdykova (KAZ)
11	Zsanett Németh (HUN)
12	Francy Rädelt (GER)
13	Iselin Moen Solheim (NOR)
14	Kamilė Gaučaitė (LTU)
15	Ayşegül Özbege (TUR)
16	Kim Cho-lee (KOR)
17	Georgina Nelthorpe (GBR)
18	Mariya Oryashkova (BUL)
