= Cynthia Vescan =

French freestyle wrestler

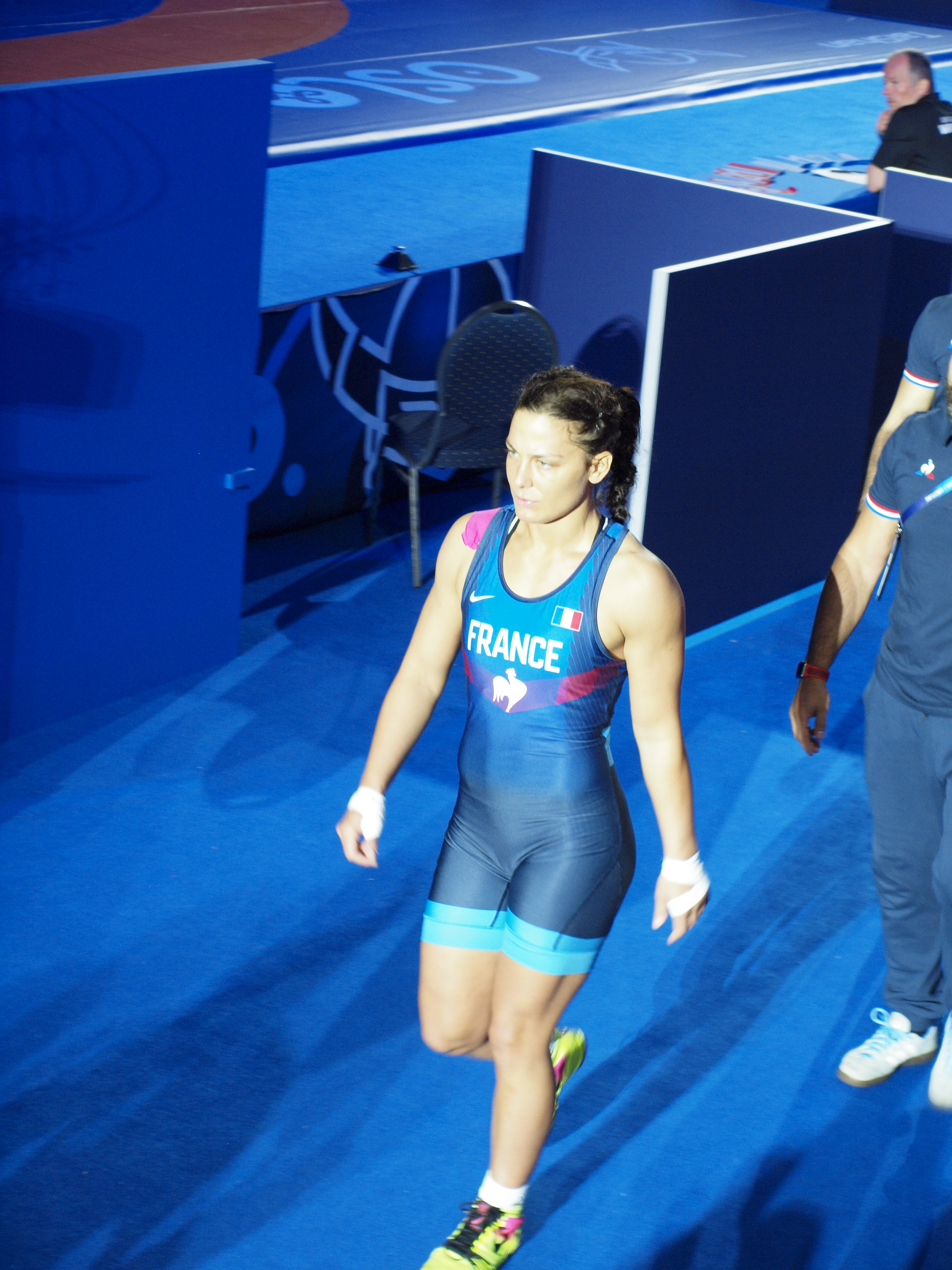
- Vescan at the 2021 World Championships

Personal information
- Full name: Cynthia Vanessa Vescan
- Born: 7 February 1992 (age 34) Strasbourg, France
- Height: 1.70 m (5 ft 7 in)
- Weight: 74 kg (163 lb)
Medal record
Women's freestyle wrestling
Representing France
European Championships
| Bronze medal – third place | 2018 Kaspiysk | 72 kg |
| Bronze medal – third place | 2021 Warsaw | 76 kg |
| Disqualified | 2023 Zagreb | 76 kg |

Cynthia Vanessa Vescan (born 7 February 1992) is a French freestyle wrestler of Romanian origin.

== Background and wrestling career ==
Vescan was born in Strasbourg, France. At the 2012 Summer Olympics held in London, United Kingdom, she competed in the women's freestyle 72 kg event where she lost her first bout in the round of 16 against Moldova's Svetlana Saenko.

At the 2016 Olympics, she also lost her first bout, this time in the -75 kg weight class, to Vasilisa Marzaliuk.

She won bronze at the 2018 European Championships, being knocked out by Anna Fransson, before winning her bronze medal by beating Beste Civelek Altug.

She won bronze at the 2021 European Championships, in the -72 kg weight class. She beat Mariya Gerginova Oryashkova and Aysegul Özbege, before losing to Epp Mäe in the semifinal. As she lost in the semi-final she was placed into the repechage, where she won her bronze by beating Sabira Aliyeva. In 2021, she won one of the bronze medals in the 76 kg event at the Grand Prix de France Henri Deglane 2021 held in Nice, France.

== Mixed martial arts career ==
In March 2021, news surfaced that Vescan had signed a contract with Professional Fighters League with intentions to compete in mixed martial arts in the future.

Vescan was scheduled to make her debut in mixed martial arts against Amanda Leve on August 19, 2021, at PFL 8. However, Vescan pulled out of the bout.
