= Samar Amer =

Egyptian freestyle wrestler

Samar Amer Ibrahim Hamza
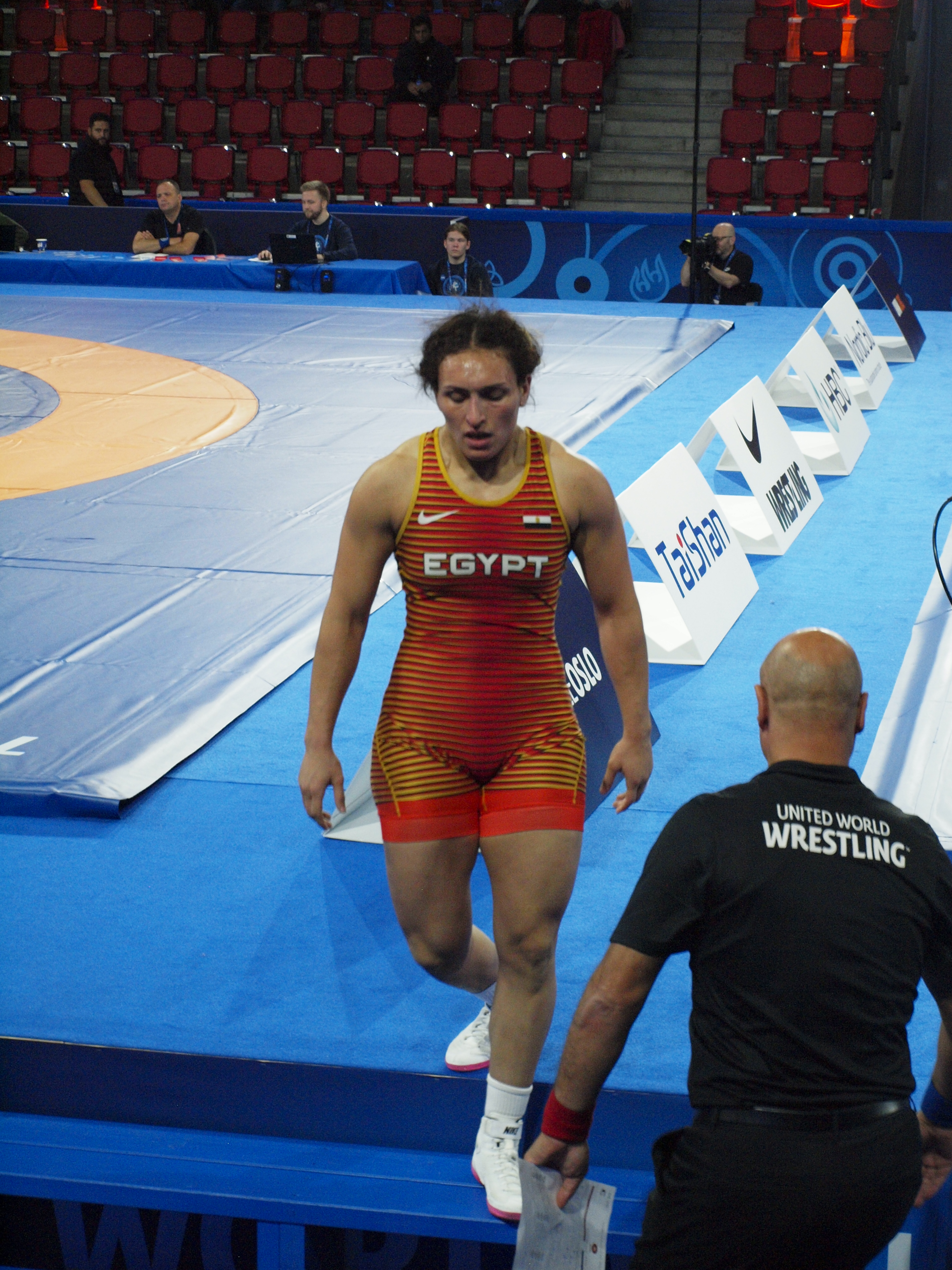
- Amer in 2021

Personal information
- Full name: Samar Amer Ibrahim Hamza
- Born: 4 April 1995 (age 31)

Sport
- Country: Egypt
- Sport: Freestyle wrestling
- Weight class: 76 kg
Medal record
Women's freestyle wrestling
Representing Egypt
World Championships
Silver medal – second place	2022 Belgrade	76 kg
Bronze medal – third place	2021 Oslo	76 kg
African Championships
Gold medal – first place	2016 Alexandria	76 kg
Gold medal – first place	2018 Port Harcourt	76 kg
Gold medal – first place	2019 Hammamet	76 kg
Gold medal – first place	2020 Algiers	76 kg
Gold medal – first place	2022 El Jadida	76 kg
Gold medal – first place	2023 Hammamet	76 kg
African Games
Bronze medal – third place	2019 Rabat	68 kg
Bronze medal – third place	2023 Accra	76 kg
Islamic Solidarity Games
Bronze medal – third place	2025 Riyadh	76 kg
Mediterranean Games
Gold medal – first place	2026 Taranto	76 kg
Bronze medal – third place	2018 Tarragona	76 kg
Bronze medal – third place	2022 Oran	76 kg

Samar Amer (born 4 April 1995) is an Egyptian freestyle wrestler. She won the silver medal in the women's 76 kg event at the 2022 World Wrestling Championships held in Belgrade, Serbia. She became the first woman representing Egypt to reach a final at the World Wrestling Championships.

Amer competed at the 2016 Summer Olympics in Rio de Janeiro, Brazil, and the 2020 Summer Olympics in Tokyo, Japan.

== Career ==
In 2016, Amer competed in the women's freestyle 75 kg event at the 2016 Summer Olympics, in which she was eliminated in the round of 32 by Ekaterina Bukina.

In 2021, Amer won the silver medal in the 76 kg event at the Matteo Pellicone Ranking Series 2021 held in Rome, Italy. She qualified at the 2021 African & Oceania Wrestling Olympic Qualification Tournament to represent Egypt at the 2020 Summer Olympics in Tokyo, Japan. She competed in the women's freestyle 76 kg event. She won one of the bronze medals in the women's 76 kg event at the 2021 World Wrestling Championships held in Oslo, Norway.

In 2022, Amer competed in the women's 76 kg event at the Yasar Dogu Tournament held in Istanbul, Turkey. She won the gold medal in her event at the 2022 African Wrestling Championships held in El Jadida, Morocco. She won one of the bronze medals in the 76 kg event at the 2022 Mediterranean Games held in Oran, Algeria. She won the bronze medal in her event at the 2022 Tunis Ranking Series event held in Tunis, Tunisia. She won the silver medal in the women's 76 kg event at the 2022 World Wrestling Championships held in Belgrade, Serbia.

Amer won the gold medal in her event at the 2023 African Wrestling Championships held in Hammamet, Tunisia.

Amer competed at the 2024 African & Oceania Wrestling Olympic Qualification Tournament held in Alexandria, Egypt without qualifying for the 2024 Summer Olympics in Paris, France. She also competed at the 2024 World Wrestling Olympic Qualification Tournament held in Istanbul, Turkey without qualifying for the Olympics. She was eliminated in her first match.
