= Zhou Qian =

Chinese freestyle wrestler

Personal information
- National team: China
- Born: March 11, 1989 (age 37) Yueyang, China
- Height: 170 cm (5 ft 7 in)
- Weight: 75 kg (165 lb; 11 st 11 lb)

Sport
- Country: China
- Sport: Wrestling
Medal record
Women's freestyle wrestling
Representing China
Olympic Games
Bronze medal – third place	2020 Tokyo	76 kg
World Championships
Bronze medal – third place	2014 Tashkent	75 kg
Silver medal – second place	2015 Las Vegas	75 kg
Asian Championships
Gold medal – first place	2018 Bishkek	76 kg
Bronze medal – third place	2015 Doha	75 kg
Asian Games
Gold medal – first place	2018 Jakarta-Palembang	76 kg

Zhou Qian (Chinese: 周倩; pinyin: Zhōu Qiàn; born March 11, 1989) is a wrestler from China. She won the bronze medal at the 2014 World Wrestling Championships. She also won the silver medal at the 2015 World Wrestling Championships and the bronze medal at the 2015 Asian Wrestling Championships.

In 2021, she won one of the bronze medals in the women's 76 kg event at the 2020 Summer Olympics in Tokyo, Japan.
