= Hwang Eun-ju =

South Korean freestyle wrestler

Personal information
- Born: 22 June 1987 (age 39)

Sport
- Country: South Korea
- Sport: Amateur wrestling
- Event: Freestyle
Medal record
Women's freestyle wrestling
Representing South Korea
Asian Games
Bronze medal – third place	2014 Incheon	75 kg
Asian Championships
Bronze medal – third place	2019 Xi'an	76 kg

Hwang Eun-ju (Korean: 黃銀秋; born 22 June 1987) is a South Korean freestyle wrestler. She won one of the bronze medals in the women's freestyle 75 kg event at the 2014 Asian Games held in Incheon, South Korea.

== Career ==
In 2015, she competed in the women's freestyle 75 kg event at the World Wrestling Championships held in Las Vegas, United States. The following year, she competed at both the first World Wrestling Olympic Qualification Tournament and second World Wrestling Olympic Qualification Tournament hoping to qualify for the 2016 Summer Olympics in Rio de Janeiro, Brazil. In both competitions she was eliminated in her first match.

In 2019, she won one of the bronze medals in the women's 76 kg event at the Asian Wrestling Championships held in Xi'an, China. In the same year, she also competed in the women's freestyle 76 kg at the 2019 World Wrestling Championships held in Nur-Sultan, Kazakhstan. She was eliminated in her first match by Sabira Aliyeva of Azerbaijan.

She competed at the 2024 Asian Wrestling Olympic Qualification Tournament in Bishkek, Kyrgyzstan hoping to qualify for the 2024 Summer Olympics in Paris, France. She did not qualify for the Olympics. She also competed at the 2024 World Wrestling Olympic Qualification Tournament held in Istanbul, Turkey without qualifying for the Olympics. She was eliminated in her first match.

== Achievements ==
Year	Tournament	Location	Result	Event
2014	Asian Games	Incheon, South Korea	3rd	Freestyle 75 kg
2019	Asian Championships	Xi'an, China	3rd	Freestyle 76 kg
