= Aiperi Medet Kyzy =

Kyrgyzstani freestyle wrestler

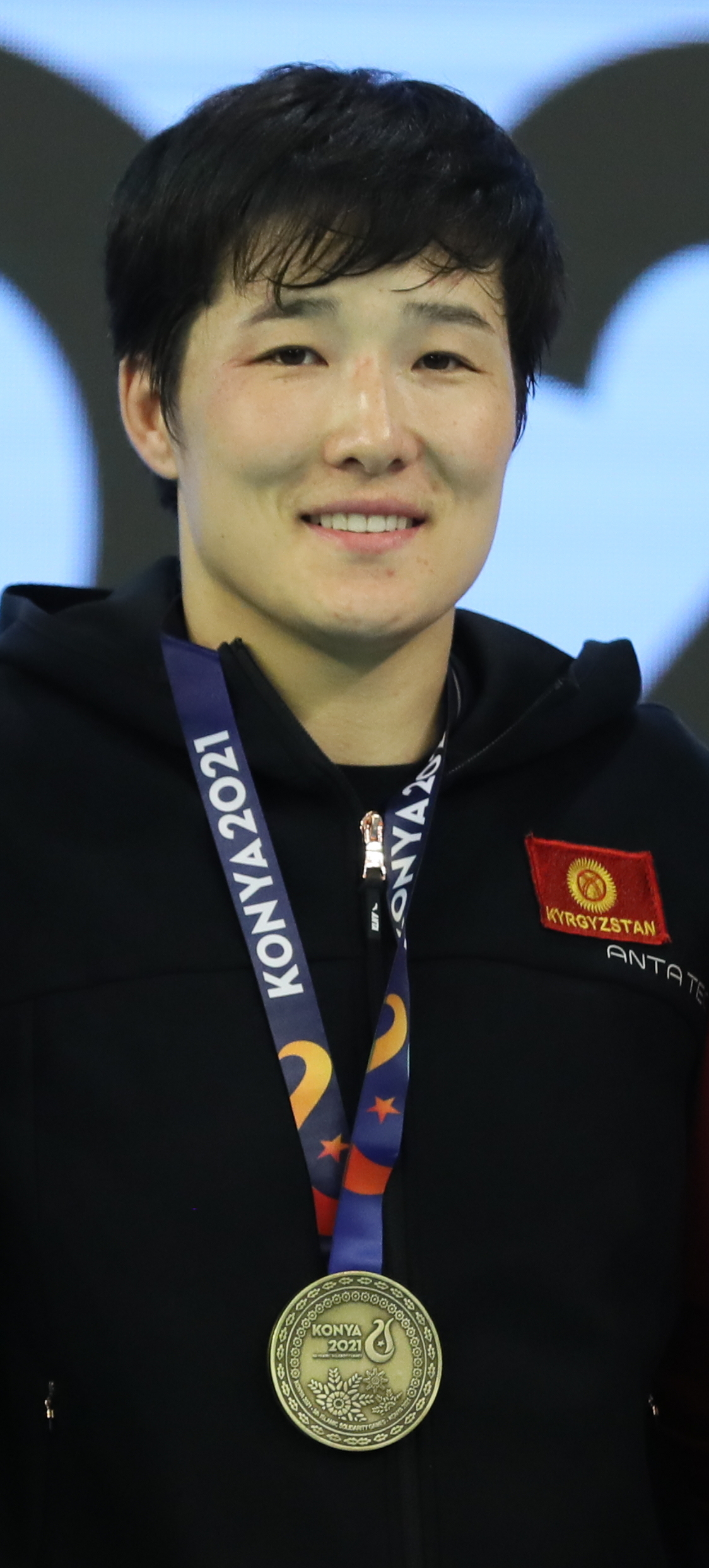
- Aiperi Medet Kyzy at the 2021 Islamic Solidarity Games in Konya, Turkey

Personal information
- Nationality: Kyrgyzstan
- Born: 30 March 1999 (age 27) Bishkek, Kyrgyzstan
- Height: 173 cm (5 ft 8 in)

Sport
- Country: Kyrgyzstan
- Sport: Amateur wrestling disability_class =
- Weight class: 76 kg
- Event: Freestyle
Medal record
Women's freestyle wrestling
Representing Kyrgyzstan
World Championships
| Silver medal – second place | 2023 Belgrade | 76 kg |
| Silver medal – second place | 2025 Zagreb | 76 kg |
| Bronze medal – third place | 2021 Oslo | 76 kg |
Asian Championships
| Gold medal – first place | 2022 Ulaanbaatar | 76 kg |
| Gold medal – first place | 2024 Bishkek | 76 kg |
| Gold medal – first place | 2025 Amman | 76 kg |
| Silver medal – second place | 2020 New Delhi | 76 kg |
| Silver medal – second place | 2021 Almaty | 76 kg |
| Silver medal – second place | 2023 Astana | 76 kg |
| Silver medal – second place | 2026 Bishkek | 76 kg |
Individual World Cup
| Bronze medal – third place | 2020 Belgrade | 76 kg |
Asian Games
| Gold medal – first place | 2022 Hangzhou | 76 kg |
| Bronze medal – third place | 2018 Jakarta | 76 kg |
| Bronze medal – third place | 2026 Aichi-Nagoya | 76 kg |
Islamic Solidarity Games
| Gold medal – first place | 2021 Konya | 76 kg |
| Gold medal – first place | 2025 Riyadh | 76 kg |
| Bronze medal – third place | 2017 Baku | 75 kg |
Asian Indoor Games
| Bronze medal – third place | 2017 Ashgabat | 75 kg |
Yasar Dogu Tournament
| Gold medal – first place | 2022 Istanbul | 76 kg |
| Gold medal – first place | 2024 Antalya | 76 kg |
| Gold medal – first place | 2025 Kocaeli | 76 kg |
| Bronze medal – third place | 2020 Istanbul | 76 kg |
Grand Prix
| Silver medal – second place | 2025 Tirana | 76 kg |
| Bronze medal – third place | 2025 Budapest | 76 kg |
World U23 Championships
| Gold medal – first place | 2021 Belgrade | 76 kg |
| Bronze medal – third place | 2019 Budapest | 76 kg |

Aiperi Medet Kyzy (Kyrgyz: Айпери Медет кызы, romanized: Ayperi Medet kyzy; born 30 March 1999) is a Kyrgyzstani freestyle wrestler. She won the silver medal in the women's 76 kg event at the 2023 World Wrestling Championships held in Belgrade, Serbia. She also represented Kyrgyzstan at the 2020 Summer Olympics in Tokyo, Japan.

At the 2022 Asian Games held in Hangzhou, China, Medet Kyzy won the gold medal in the women's 76 kg event. She is also a two-time medalist, including gold, at the Islamic Solidarity Games and a seven-time medalist, including three gold medals, at the Asian Wrestling Championships.

== Career ==
Medet Kyzy won the bronze medal in the 75 kg event at the 2017 Islamic Solidarity Games held in Baku, Azerbaijan. In August 2017, she competed in the 75 kg event at the World Wrestling Championships held in Paris, France. A month later, Medet Kyzy won one of the bronze medals in the women's 75 kg event at the Asian Indoor and Martial Arts Games held in Ashgabat, Turkmenistan. At the 2018 Asian Games held in Jakarta, Indonesia, Medet Kyzy won one of the bronze medals in the women's 76 kg event.

At the 2019 World U23 Wrestling Championship held in Budapest, Hungary, she won one of the bronze medals in the 76 kg event. In 2020, Medet Kyzy won the silver medal in the 76 kg event at the Asian Wrestling Championships in New Delhi, India. In the final, she lost against Hiroe Minagawa of Japan. In the same year, she also won one of the bronze medals in the women's 76 kg event at the 2020 Individual Wrestling World Cup held in Belgrade, Serbia.

In April 2021, Medet Kyzy qualified at the Asian Olympic Qualification Tournament held in Almaty, Kazakhstan to represent Kyrgyzstan at the 2020 Summer Olympics in Tokyo, Japan. In the same month, she secured the silver medal in her event at the 2021 Asian Wrestling Championships held in the same venue as the Asian Olympic Qualification Tournament. At the Olympics, Medet Kyzy lost her bronze medal match against Yasemin Adar of Turkey in the women's 76 kg event.

Medet Kyzy won one of the bronze medals in the women's 76 kg event at the 2021 World Wrestling Championships held in Oslo, Norway. At the 2021 U23 World Wrestling Championships held in Belgrade, Serbia, she won the gold medal in the 76 kg event. In 2022, she won the gold medal in the 76 kg event at the Yasar Dogu Tournament held in Istanbul, Turkey. Medet Kyzy also won the gold medal in her event at the 2022 Asian Wrestling Championships held in Ulaanbaatar, Mongolia. Her gold medal streak continued at the 2021 Islamic Solidarity Games in Konya, Turkey with victory in the 76 kg event. She competed in the 76 kg event at the 2022 World Wrestling Championships held in Belgrade, Serbia.

Medet Kyzy won the silver medal in the women's 76 kg event at the 2023 Grand Prix Zagreb Open held in Zagreb, Croatia. She won one of the bronze medals in her event at the 2023 Ibrahim Moustafa Tournament held in Alexandria, Egypt. She won the silver medal in her event at the 2023 Asian Wrestling Championships held in Astana, Kazakhstan.

In September 2023, Medet Kyzy won the silver medal in the women's 76 kg event at the World Wrestling Championships held in Belgrade, Serbia. As a result, she earned a quota place for Kyrgyzstan for the 2024 Summer Olympics in Paris, France. Two weeks later, she won the gold medal in the women's 76 kg event at the 2022 Asian Games held in Hangzhou, China. She defeated Zhamila Bakbergenova of Kazakhstan in her gold medal match.

In April 2024, Medet Kyzy won the gold medal in her event at the Asian Wrestling Championships held in Bishkek, Kyrgyzstan. She defeated Huang Yuanyuan of China in her gold medal match. In August 2024, Medet Kyzy lost her bronze medal match in the women's 76 kg event at the Summer Olympics.

She won the silver medal in the women's 76 kg event at the 2025 World Wrestling Championships held in Zagreb, Croatia.

== Achievements ==
| Year | Tournament | Location | Result | Event |
|---|---|---|---|---|
| 2017 | Islamic Solidarity Games | Baku, Azerbaijan | 3rd | Freestyle 75 kg |
| 2017 | Asian Indoor and Martial Arts Games | Ashgabat, Turkmenistan | 3rd | Freestyle 75 kg |
| 2018 | Asian Games | Jakarta, Indonesia | 3rd | Freestyle 76 kg |
| 2020 | Asian Championships | New Delhi, India | 2nd | Freestyle 76 kg |
| 2021 | Asian Championships | Almaty, Kazakhstan | 2nd | Freestyle 76 kg |
| 2021 | World Championships | Oslo, Norway | 3rd | Freestyle 76 kg |
| 2022 | Asian Championships | Ulaanbaatar, Mongolia | 1st | Freestyle 76 kg |
| 2022 | Islamic Solidarity Games | Konya, Turkey | 1st | Freestyle 76 kg |
| 2023 | Asian Championships | Astana, Kazakhstan | 2nd | Freestyle 76 kg |
| 2023 | World Championships | Belgrade, Serbia | 2nd | Freestyle 76 kg |
| 2023 | Asian Games | Hangzhou, China | 1st | Freestyle 76 kg |
| 2024 | Asian Championships | Bishkek, Kyrgyzstan | 1st | Freestyle 76 kg |
| 2025 | Asian Championships | Amman, Jordan | 1st | Freestyle 76 kg |
| 2025 | World Championships | Zagreb, Croatia | 2nd | Freestyle 76 kg |
| 2025 | Islamic Solidarity Games | Riyadh, Saudi Arabia | 1st | Freestyle 76 kg |
| 2026 | Asian Championships | Bishkek, Kyrgyzstan | 2nd | Freestyle 76 kg |
| 2026 | Asian Games | Aichi and Nagoya, Japan | 3rd | Freestyle 76 kg |
