= Yoshiko Inoue =

Japanese wrestler (born 1988)

Personal information
- Born: April 26, 1988 (age 38) Yamaguchi, Japan
Medal record
Women's wrestling
Representing Japan
World Championships
Bronze medal – third place	2011 Istanbul	67 kg
Asian Championships
Gold medal – first place	2011 Tashkent	67 kg
Bronze medal – third place	2009 Pattaya	67 kg
Bronze medal – third place	2010 New Delhi	72 kg

Yoshiko Inoue (井上 佳子, Inoue Yoshiko; born April 26, 1988 in Yamaguchi) is a female wrestler from Japan.
