= Zhang Fengliu =

Chinese wrestler (born 1989)

Medal record

Women's freestyle wrestling

Representing China

Olympic Games
| Bronze medal – third place | 2016 Rio de Janeiro | 75 kg |

World Championships
| Gold medal – first place | 2013 Budapest | 72 kg |

Asian Championships
| Bronze medal – third place | 2008 Jeju City | 67 kg |
| Bronze medal – third place | 2009 Pattaya | 63 kg |

Zhang Fengliu (simplified Chinese: 张凤柳; traditional Chinese: 張鳳柳; pinyin: Zhāng Fèng Lǐu; born 15 November 1989 in Chaoyang, Liaoning) is a Chinese female wrestler, the bronze medalist in women's freestyle 75 kg wrestling at the 2016 Olympics in Rio de Janeiro, Brazil. She competes in 72 kg division and won the gold medal at the 2013 World Wrestling Championships in the same division after defeating European and Olympic champion Natalia Vorobieva of Russia.
