= Jaramit Weffer =

Venezuelan freestyle wrestler

Personal information
- Nationality: Venezuela
- Born: 3 November 1985 (age 40) Punto Fijo, Venezuela

Sport
- Sport: Wrestling
- Event: Freestyle
Medal record
Women's freestyle wrestling
Representing Venezuela
Pan American Games
Bronze medal – third place	2011 Guadalajara	72 kg

Jaramit Weffer (born 3 November 1985) is a Venezuelan freestyle wrestler.

She competed in the women's freestyle 75 kg event at the 2016 Summer Olympics, in which she was eliminated in the round of 16 by Annabelle Ali.
