= Ayşegül Özbege =

Turkish freestyle wrestler

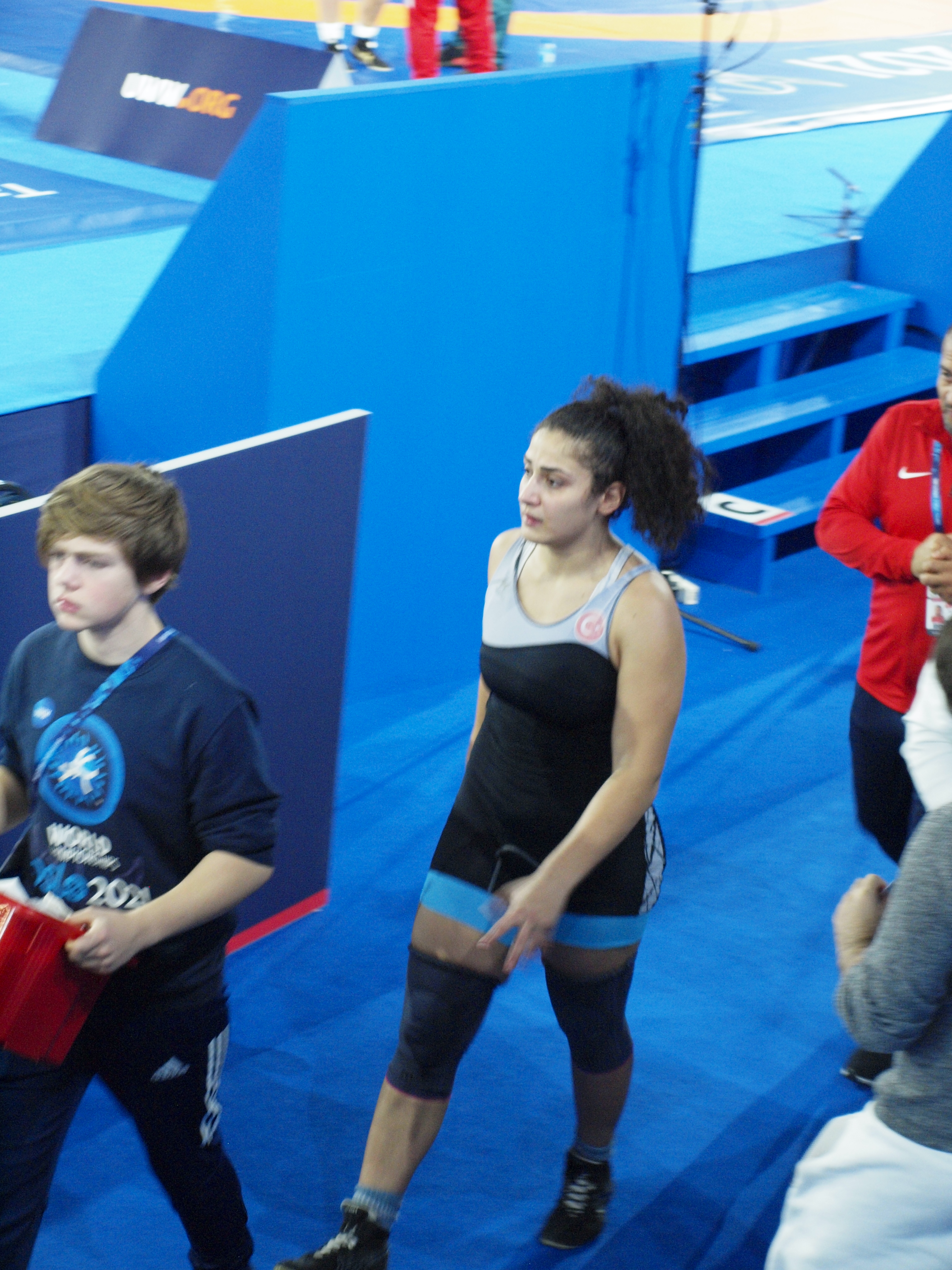

Sport
- Country: Turkey
- Sport: Amateur wrestling
- Event: Freestyle
- Club: Enka SK
Medal record
Women's freestyle wrestling
Representing Turkey
Yasar Dogu Tournament
Bronze medal – third place	2021 Istanbul	76 kg
World U23 Championships
Silver medal – second place	2018 Bucharest	76 kg
European U23 Championship
Silver medal – second place	2021 Skopje	76 kg
Silver medal – second place	2019 Novi Sad	76 kg
European Juniors Championships
Silver medal – second place	2018 Rome	76 kg
Bronze medal – third place	2016 Bucharest	76 kg

Ayşegül Özbege is a Turkish freestyle wrestler competing in the 76 kg division. She is a member of Enkaspor.

== Career ==
In 2018, Aysegul Ozbege won a silver medal in the Senior U23 World Wrestling Championships in Romania.

She won the silver medal in the women's 76 kg event at the 2019 European U23 Wrestling Championship held in Novi Sad, Serbia.

In 2021, she won the silver medal in the women's 76 kg event at the European U23 Wrestling Championship held in Skopje, North Macedonia.

In 2022, she competed in the women's 76 kg event at the Yasar Dogu Tournament held in Istanbul, Turkey.
