= Guzel Manyurova =

Tatar wrestler

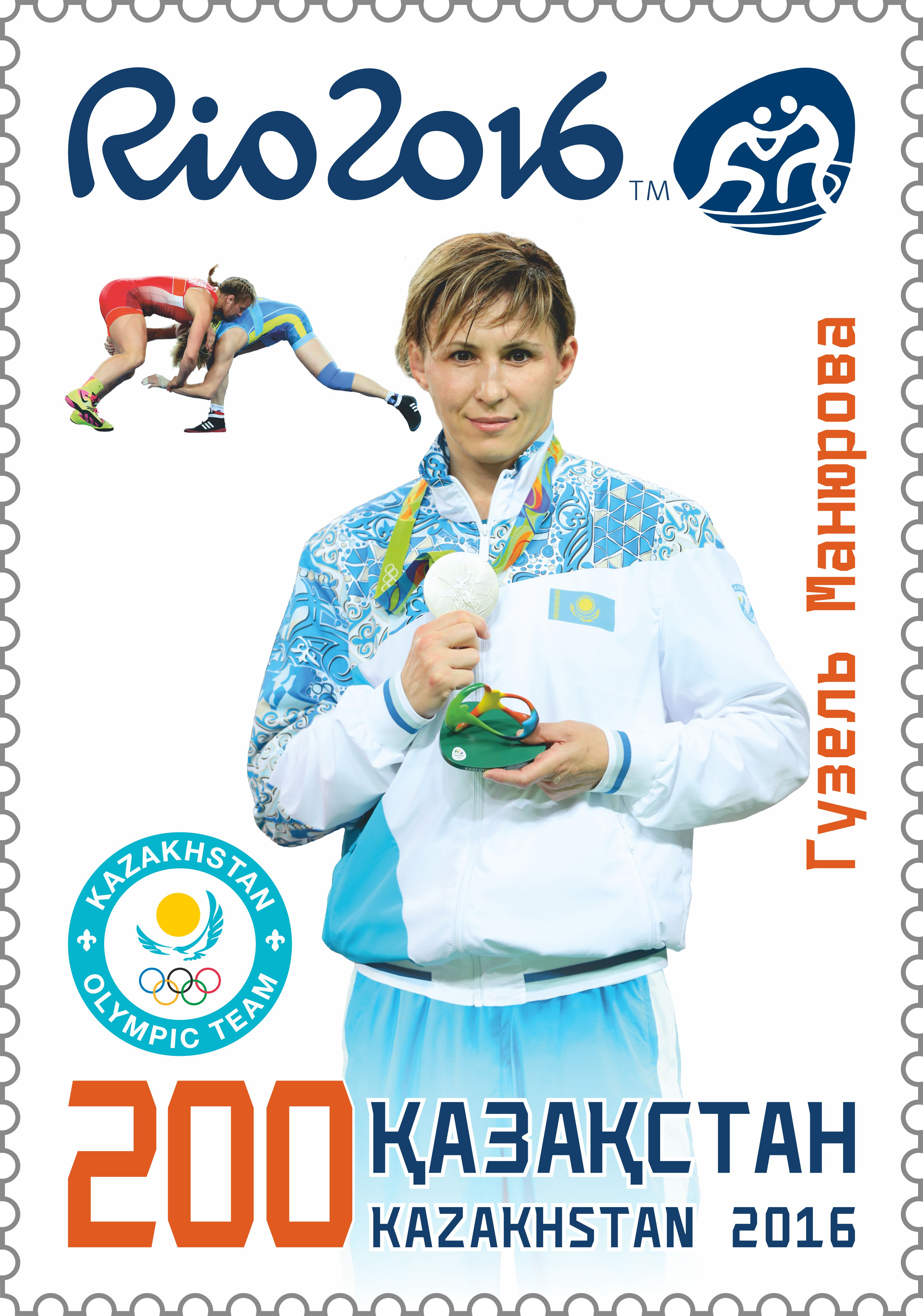
- Manyurova on a 2016 stamp of Kazakhstan

Personal information
- Native name: Гюзель Тагировна Манюрова; Гүзәл Таһир кызы Манюрова
- Full name: Guzel Tagirovna Manyurova
- National team: Kazakhstan
- Born: 24 January 1978 (age 48) Saransk, Russian SFSR, Soviet Union
- Height: 174 cm (5 ft 9 in)

Sport
- Sport: Wrestling
- Event: Freestyle
- Coached by: Sarken Ayasbekov (2010–); Aleksander Kolyvanov (2006–); Igor Fitkulin (2006–)
Medal record

Women's freestyle wrestling
Representing Russia
Olympic Games
Silver medal – second place	2004 Athens	72 kg
World Championships
Bronze medal – third place	2007 Baku	72 kg
Representing Kazakhstan
Olympic Games
Silver medal – second place	2016 Rio de Janeiro	75 kg
Bronze medal – third place	2012 London	72 kg
World Championships
Silver medal – second place	2012 Strathcona County	72 kg
Asian Games
Silver medal – second place	2014 Incheon	75 kg
Bronze medal – third place	2010 Guangzhou	72 kg
Asian Championships
Gold medal – first place	2010 New Delhi	72 kg
Gold medal – first place	2011 Tashkent	72 kg
Gold medal – first place	2012 Gumi	72 kg
Gold medal – first place	2014 Astana	75 kg

Guzel Tagirkyzy Manyurova (Tatar: Гүзәл Таһир кызы Манюрова; born 24 January 1978) is a Tatar freestyle wrestler who competed for Russia and Kazakhstan. She won three medals at the 2004, 2012 and 2016 Olympics.

Manyurova graduated from the Moscow Veterinarian Academy. Until 2009 she trained at Dynamo Moscow and competed for Russia. She later moved to Alma Ata.
