= Andrea Olaya =

Colombian freestyle wrestler

Personal information
- Born: 9 December 1994 (age 31) Neiva, Colombia

Sport
- Sport: Freestyle wrestling
Medal record
Representing Colombia
Women's freestyle wrestling
Pan American Games
Bronze medal – third place	2019 Lima	76 kg
Pan American Championships
Silver medal – second place	2014 Mexico City	75 kg
Silver medal – second place	2016 Frisco	75 kg
Silver medal – second place	2018 Lima	76 kg
Bronze medal – third place	2011 Rionegro	67 kg
Bronze medal – third place	2013 Panama City	72 kg
Bronze medal – third place	2015 Santiago	75 kg
Bronze medal – third place	2017 Salvador	75 kg
Bronze medal – third place	2020 Ottawa	76 kg
Central American and Caribbean Games
Gold medal – first place	2018 Barranquilla	76 kg
South American Games
Gold medal – first place	2018 Cochabamba	76 kg
Bronze medal – third place	2014 Santiago	75 kg
Bolivarian Games
Silver medal – second place	2013 Trujillo	72 kg
Silver medal – second place	2017 Santa Marta	75 kg

Andrea Carolina Olaya Gutiérrez (born December 9, 1994) is a Colombian freestyle wrestler. She competed in the women's freestyle 75 kg event at the 2016 Summer Olympics, in which she was eliminated in the round of 16 by Adeline Gray.

Winner of Desafío 2022: The Box 2
