= Hiroe Minagawa =

Japanese sport wrestler

Hiroe Minagawa 鈴木博恵
Personal information
- Nationality: (Japan) Japanese
- Born: 19 August 1987 (age 38) Uji, Kyoto Prefecture, Japan
- Height: 1.62 m (5 ft 4 in)
- Weight: 76 kg (168 lb)

Sport
- Country: Japan
- Sport: Wrestling
- Event: Free style
Medal record
Women's Freestyle Wrestling
Representing Japan
World Championships
Silver medal – second place	2019 Nur-Sultan	76 kg
Bronze medal – third place	2018 Budapest	76 kg
Bronze medal – third place	2017 Paris	75 kg
Asian Games
Silver medal – second place	2018 Jakarta	76 kg
Asian Championships
Gold medal – first place	2013 New Delhi	72kg
Gold medal – first place	2015 Doha	75kg
Silver medal – second place	2018 Bishkek	76kg
Bronze medal – third place	2014 Astana	75kg
World Combat Games
Silver medal – second place	2010 Beijing	72kg
Wrestling World Cup
Silver medal – second place	2018 Takasaki
Golden Grand Prix Ivan Yarygin
Gold medal – first place	2019 Krasnoyarsk	76kg

Hiroe Minagawa (皆川 博恵, Minagawa Hiroe; born 19 August 1987) née Suzuki is a Japanese sport wrestler who competes in the women's freestyle category. She claimed silver medal in the women's 76 kg event during the 2019 World Wrestling Championships and also qualified to represent Japan at the 2020 Summer Olympics which will be held in Japan.

She was part of the Japan team which emerged as winners of the Wrestling World Cup in 2018.
