= Kiran Bishnoi =

Indian freestyle wrestler

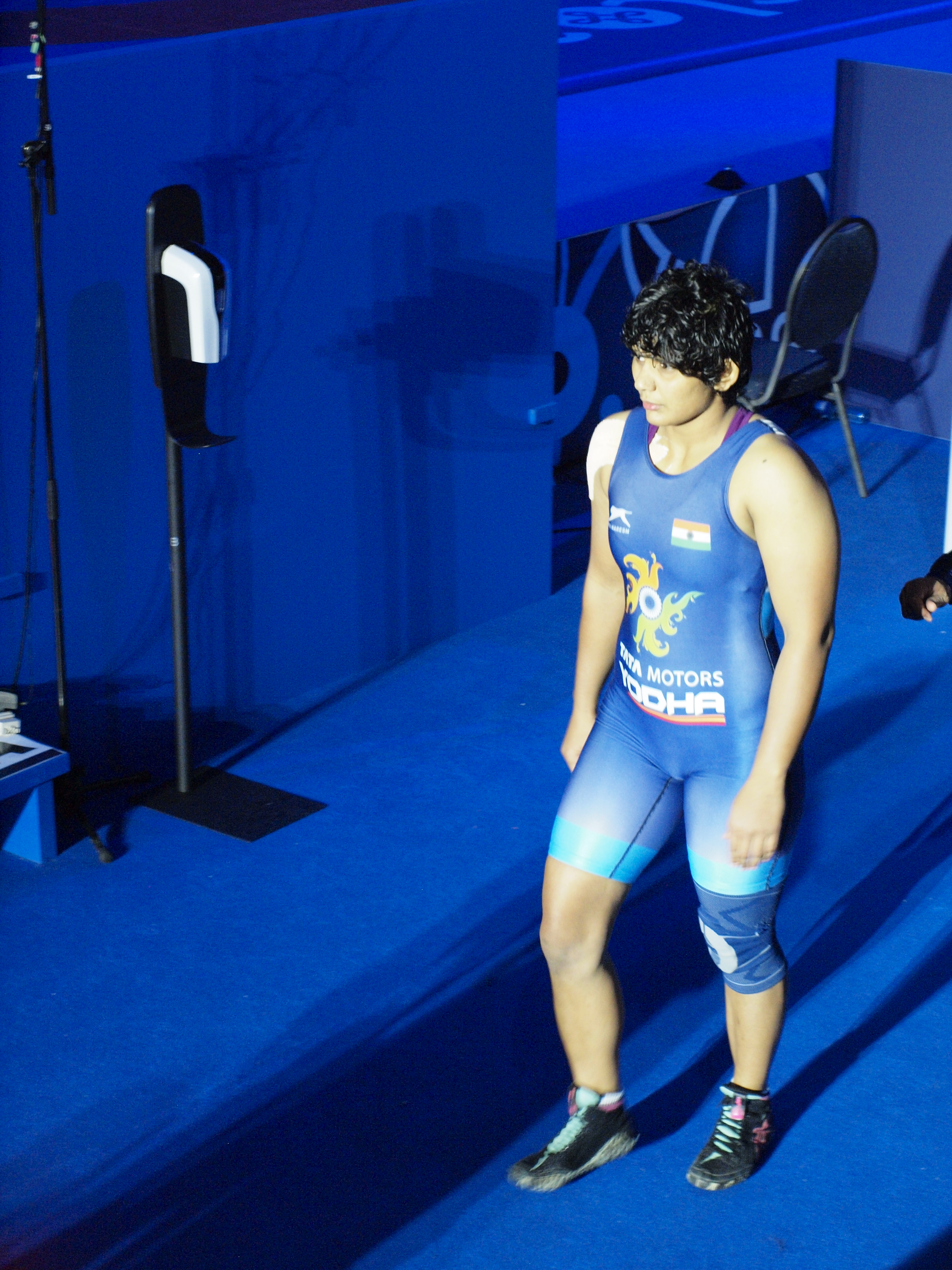
- Kiran Bishnoi at the 2021 World Wrestling Championships in Oslo, Norway

Personal information
- Nationality: Indian
- Born: 2 January 1992 (age 34) Khera village, Hisar district, Haryana, India

Sport
- Country: India
- Sport: Wrestling
- Event: Freestyle wrestling
Medal record
Women's Freestyle wrestling
Representing India
Asian Games
Bronze medal – third place	2022 Hangzhou	76 kg
Commonwealth Games
Bronze medal – third place	2018 Gold Coast	76 kg
Commonwealth Championships
Gold medal – first place	2017 Johannesburg	72 kg
- Updated on 18 August 2018

Kiran Bishnoi, also known as Kiran Godara or simply Kiran, (born 2 January 1992) is a freestyle wrestler from India. She was a bronze medalist at the 2018 Commonwealth Games. She has also been gold medallist at the Commonwealth Wrestling Championships in 2017. She won a bronze medal at the 2022 Asian Games.

== Early life and career ==
Bishnoi, who is also known as Kiran Godara, was born to Kuldeep Godara and Sunita Godara in Rawat Khera village of Hisar district, Haryana. She spent her childhood at her maternal grandparents' home in Kalirawan village of Hisar district. Her maternal grandfather Ramswaroop Khichad Kalirawna was a wrestler, and he used to take her with him for wrestling practice. This led to development of her interest in the sport. After the death of her grandfather in 2010, she returned to her parental home in Hisar, and started practicing wrestling at Mahabir Stadium under the guidance of her coach Vishnu. She missed the trials of 2014 Commonwealth Games due to a career-threatening knee injury. After eventually recovering from the injury, she became national champion in 2015. She also won Bharat Kesri Dangal title in 2016, and was finalist of the event in 2015.

Bishnoi won gold medal at the 2017 Commonwealth Wrestling Championships in Johannesburg. At the 2018 Commonwealth Games, after losing the semifinal by technical fall to Nigeria's Blessing Onyebuchi in the 76 kg category, Bishnoi won the bronze medal bout by technical fall win over Mauritius' Katouskia Pariadhaven.

In 2021, she lost her bronze medal match in the women's 76 kg event at the World Wrestling Championships held in Oslo, Norway.

She won one of the bronze medals in the women's 76 kg event at the 2022 Asian Games held in Hangzhou, China.
