= Aline Ferreira =

Brazilian wrestler (born 1986)

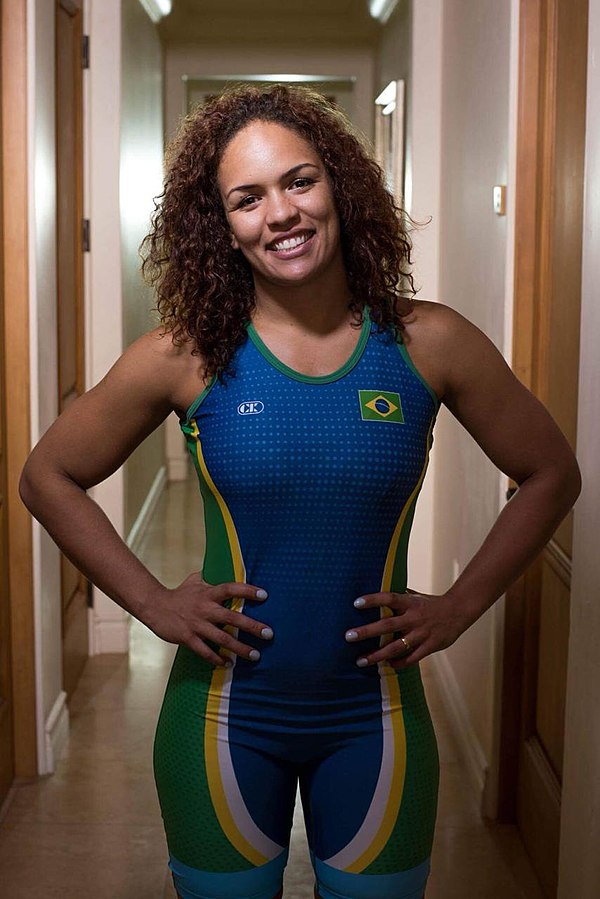

Personal information
- Full name: Aline da Silva Ferreira
- Nationality: Brazilian
- Born: 18 October 1986 (age 39) São Paulo
- Height: 5 ft 8 in (173 cm)
- Weight: 176 lb (80 kg)
Medal record
Women's freestyle wrestling
Representing Brazil
World Championships
Silver medal – second place	2014 Tashkent	75 kg
Pan American Games
Silver medal – second place	2011 Guadalajara	72 kg
Silver medal – second place	2019 Lima	76 kg
Bronze medal – third place	2015 Toronto	75 kg
Pan American Championships
Silver medal – second place	2017 Salvador	75 kg
South American Games
Gold medal – first place	2014 Santiago	75 kg

Aline da Silva Ferreira (born 18 October 1986) is a female wrestler from Brazil. She became the 2014 Vice-World Champion in the 75 kg weight class.

== Early life ==
Ferreira first began learning judo as a teenager in her hometown of São Paulo, Brazil. After two years, she switched in 2001 to wrestling. She belongs to the Sesi Osasco São Paulo club and has primarily been trained by Alejo Morales. At 5 ft 8 in and weighing about 176 pounds, Ferreira wrestles in the heavyweight class.

== Career ==
In 2011 at the Guadalajara Pan Am Games, Ferreira won silver in the 72 kg freestyle.

She won the silver medal the 2014 World Wrestling Championships in Tashkent, Uzbekistan and she became the first Brazilian wrestler to win a medal in World Wrestling Championships.

At 2015 World Wrestling Championships in Las Vegas, United States, Ferreira lost the bronze medal, but she was classified to 2016 Olympic Games in Rio de Janeiro, Brazil.

She represented Brazil at the 2020 Summer Olympics.
