= Epp Mäe =

Estonian wrestler (born 1992)

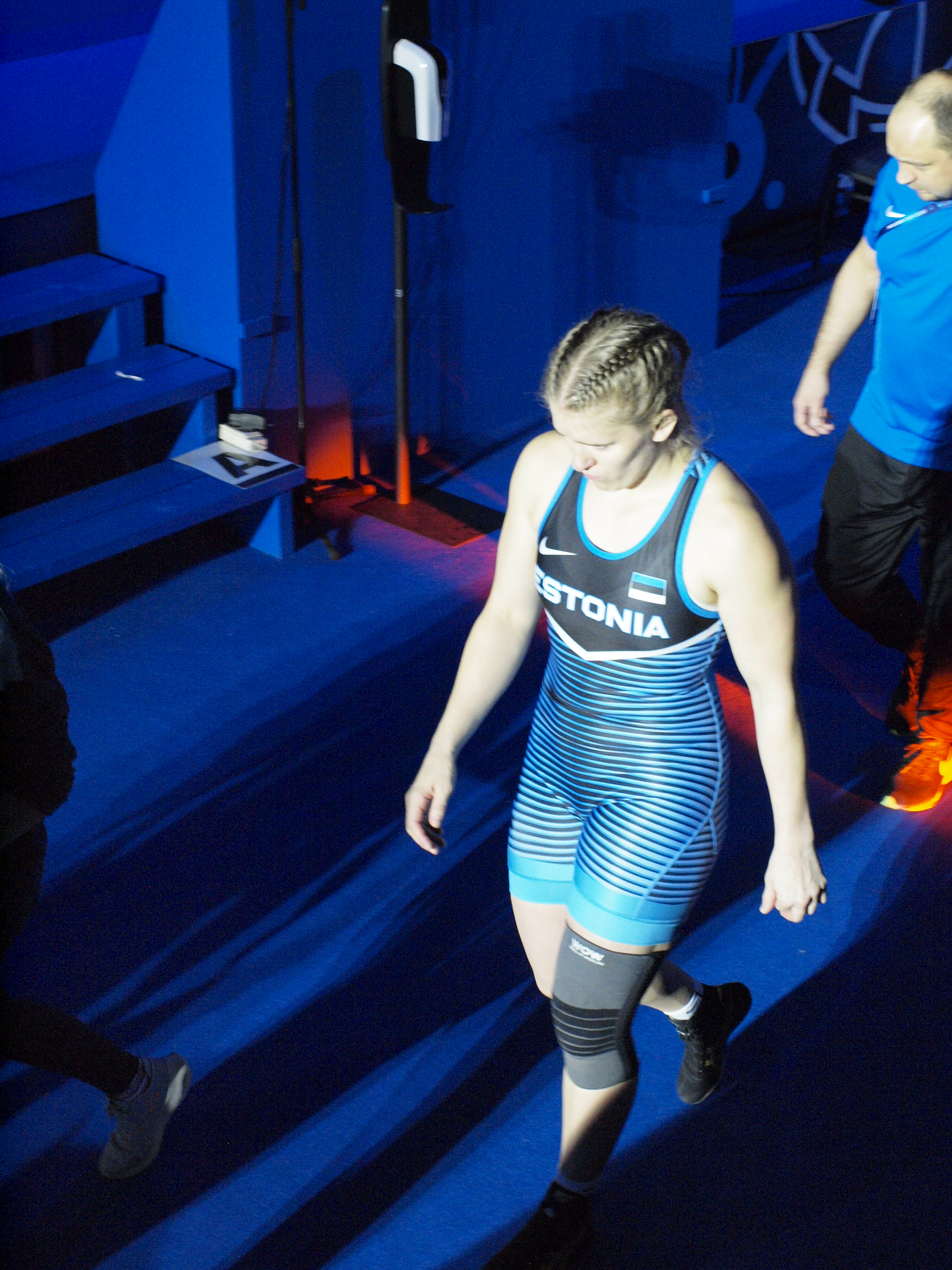
- Mäe in 2021

Personal information
- Born: 2 April 1992 (age 34) Rakvere, Estonia
- Height: 1.70 m (5 ft 7 in)
- Weight: 72–75 kg (159–165 lb)

Sport
- Sport: Freestyle wrestling
- Weight class: 76 kg
Medal record
Women's freestyle wrestling
Representing Estonia
World Championships
| Silver medal – second place | 2021 Oslo | 76 kg |
| Bronze medal – third place | 2015 Las Vegas | 75 kg |
| Bronze medal – third place | 2019 Nur-Sultan | 76 kg |
| Bronze medal – third place | 2022 Belgrade | 76 kg |
European Games
| Bronze medal – third place | 2019 Minsk | 76 kg |
European Championships
| Gold medal – first place | 2021 Warsaw | 76 kg |
| Silver medal – second place | 2022 Budapest | 76 kg |
| Bronze medal – third place | 2017 Novi Sad | 75 kg |
Women's sumo
World Games
| Gold medal – first place | 2009 Kaohsiung | 80 kg |

Epp Mäe (born 2 April 1992) is an Estonian freestyle wrestler. She won the silver medal in the women's 76 kg event at the 2021 World Wrestling Championships held in Oslo, Norway. She won a bronze medal at the 2015, 2019 and 2022 World Wrestling Championships.

== Career ==
Mäe took up wrestling in 1998, trained by her father. She has also competed in sumo and in judo.

Mäe competed at the 2016 Summer Olympics where she finished in 13th place in the Women's 76 kg class.

Mäe represented Estonia at the 2020 Summer Olympics in the Women's 76 kg class. In 2021, she won one of the bronze medals in the 76 kg event at the Grand Prix de France Henri Deglane 2021 held in Nice, France. She also won the silver medal in her event at the 2021 Poland Open held in Warsaw, Poland.

She won the silver medal in the women's 76 kg event at the 2022 European Wrestling Championships held in Budapest, Hungary. A few months later, she competed at the Matteo Pellicone Ranking Series 2022 held in Rome, Italy. She won one of the bronze medals in the women's 76 kg event at the 2022 World Wrestling Championships held in Belgrade, Serbia.

In 2023, Mäe competed at the Ibrahim Moustafa Tournament held in Alexandria, Egypt. She also competed in her event at the 2023 European Wrestling Championships held in Zagreb, Croatia and finished ninth. She was eliminated in her first match by Adeline Gray in the 76 kg event at the 2023 World Wrestling Championships held in Belgrade, Serbia.

Mäe competed in the 76 kg event at the 2024 European Wrestling Championships held in Bucharest, Romania. She was eliminated in her first match. Mäe competed at the 2024 European Wrestling Olympic Qualification Tournament in Baku, Azerbaijan hoping to qualify for the 2024 Summer Olympics in Paris, France. She was eliminated in her first match and she did not qualify for the Olympics. Mäe also competed at the 2024 World Wrestling Olympic Qualification Tournament held in Istanbul, Turkey without qualifying for the Olympics. She was eliminated in her second match.

== Achievements ==
| Year | Tournament | Location | Result | Event |
|---|---|---|---|---|
| 2015 | World Championships | Las Vegas, United States | 3rd | Freestyle 75 kg |
| 2017 | European Championships | Novi Sad, Serbia | 3rd | Freestyle 75 kg |
| 2019 | European Games | Minsk, Belarus | 3rd | Freestyle 76 kg |
| 2019 | World Championships | Nur-Sultan, Kazakhstan | 3rd | Freestyle 76 kg |
| 2021 | European Championships | Warsaw, Poland | 1st | Freestyle 76 kg |
| 2021 | World Championships | Oslo, Norway | 2nd | Freestyle 76 kg |
| 2022 | European Championships | Budapest, Hungary | 2nd | Freestyle 76 kg |
| 2022 | World Championships | Belgrade, Serbia | 3rd | Freestyle 76 kg |

Awards
| Preceded by Erika Kirpu | Estonian Sportswoman of the Year; 2015 | Succeeded by Ksenija Balta |
