= Nigeria at the 2018 Commonwealth Games =

- Flag of Nigeria
- CG code: NGR
- CGA: Nigeria Olympic Committee
- Website: www.nigeriaolympiccommittee.org

in Gold Coast, Australia 4 April 2018 – 15 April 2018
- Competitors: 88 in 8 sports
- Flag bearer: Blessing Okagbare (opening)
- Medals Ranked 9th: Gold 9 Silver 9 Bronze 6 Total 24

Commonwealth Games appearances (overview)
- 1950; 1954; 1958; 1962; 1966; 1970; 1974; 1978; 1982; 1986; 1990; 1994; 1998; 2002; 2006; 2010; 2014; 2018; 2022; 2026; 2030

Nigeria competed at the 2018 Commonwealth Games in the Gold Coast, Australia from 4 to 15 April 2018.

Track and field athlete Blessing Okagbare was the country's flag bearer during the opening ceremony.

== Medalists ==
Medal	Name	Sport	Event	Date
Gold	Roland Ezuruike	Powerlifting	Men's lightweight	10 April
Gold	Esther Oyema	Powerlifting	Women's lightweight	10 April
Gold	Ndidi Nwosu	Powerlifting	Women's heavyweight	10 April
Gold	Abdulazeez Ibrahim	Powerlifting	Men's heavyweight	10 April
Gold	Oluwatobiloba Amusan	Athletics	Women's 100 m Hurdles	13 April
Gold	Suwaibidu Galadima	Athletics	Men's 100 m T47	13 April
Gold	Odunayo Adekuoroye	Wrestling	Women's -57 kg	13 April
Gold	Blessing Oborududu	Wrestling	Women's -68 kg	13 April
Gold	Aminat Adeniyi	Wrestling	Women's -62 kg	14 April
Silver	Chukwuebuka Enekwechi	Athletics	Men's Shot Put	9 April
Silver	Bode Abiodun; Quadri Aruna; Azeez Jamiu; Olajide Omotayo; Segun Toriola	Table tennis	Men's team	9 April
Silver	Paul Kehinde	Powerlifting	Men's lightweight	10 April
Silver	Lucy Ejike	Powerlifting	Women's lightweight	10 April
Silver	Blessing Onyebuchi	Wrestling	Women's −76 kg	12 April
Silver	Yinka Ajayi; Patience Okon George; Praise Idamadudu; Glory Onome Nathaniel	Athletics	Women's 4 × 400 m Relay	14 April
Silver	Faith Obazuaye	Table tennis	Women's TT6-10	14 April
Silver	Melvin Bibo	Wrestling	Men's -86 kg	14 April
Silver	Quadri Aruna	Table tennis	Men's singles	15 April
Bronze	Bose Samuel	Wrestling	Women's −53 kg	12 April
Bronze	Ebikewenimo Welson	Wrestling	Men's −57 kg	12 April
Bronze	Amas Daniel	Wrestling	Men's -65 kg	13 April
Bronze	Oluwatobiloba Amusan; Rosemary Chukwuma; Blessing Okagbare-Ighoteguonor; Joy Udo-Gabriel	Athletics	Women's 4 × 100 m Relay	14 April
Bronze	Yetunde Odunuga	Boxing	Women's −60 kg	14 April
Bronze	Millicent Agboegbulem	Boxing	Women's −75 kg	14 April

Medals by sport
Sport	1st place, gold medalist(s)	2nd place, silver medalist(s)	3rd place, bronze medalist(s)	Total
Athletics	2	2	1	5
Boxing	0	0	2	2
Powerlifting	4	2	0	6
Table tennis	0	3	0	3
Wrestling	3	2	3	8
Total	9	9	6	24

Medals by day
Day	1st place, gold medalist(s)	2nd place, silver medalist(s)	3rd place, bronze medalist(s)	Total
5 April	0	0	0	0
6 April	0	0	0	0
7 April	0	0	0	0
8 April	0	0	0	0
9 April	0	2	0	2
10 April	4	2	0	6
11 April	0	0	0	0
12 April	0	1	2	3
13 April	4	0	1	5
14 April	1	3	3	7
15 April	0	1	0	1
Total	9	9	6	24

== Competitors ==
The following is the list of number of competitors participating at the Games per sport/discipline.

Sport	Men	Women	Total
Athletics	17	20	37
Basketball	12	0	12
Boxing	4	4	8
Gymnastics	1	1	2
Powerlifting	3	3	6
Table tennis	6	1	7
Weightlifting	2	2	4
Wrestling	6	6	12
Total	51	37	88

== Athletics ==
Men
Track & road events

Athlete	Event	Heat		Semifinal		Final	
Athlete	Event	Result	Rank	Result	Rank	Result	Rank
Enoch Olaoluwa Adegoke	100 m	10.19	1 Q	10.24	1 Q	10.35	7
Ogho-Oghene Egwero	100 m	10.38	2 Q	10.426	6	did not advance	
Seye Ogunlewe	100 m	10.20	2 Q	10.20	3 q	10.19	4
Suwaibidu Galadima	100 m T47	—N/a				11.04	1st place, gold medalist(s)
Emmanuel Arowolo	200 m	20.99	3 q	21.25	8	did not advance	
Orukpe Eraiyokan	400 m	47.19	4	did not advance			
Samson Nathaniel	400 m	46.41	2 Q	46.61	5	did not advance	
Chidi Okezie	400 m	45.84 SB	4 Q	47.33	7	did not advance	
Oyeniyi Abejoye	110 m hurdles	14.10	7	—N/a		did not advance	
Mohamed Rilwan Alowonle	400 m hurdles	49.49	4 q	—N/a		49.80	5
Henry Okorie	400 m hurdles	52.14	7	—N/a		did not advance	
Emmanuel Arowolo; Ogho-Oghene Egwero; Usheoritse Itsekiri; Seye Ogunlewe; Enoch Olaoluwa Adegoke*	4 × 100 m	38.52	3 Q	—N/a		DSQ	
Orukpe Eraiyokan; Salihu Isah; Samson Nathaniel; Chidi Okezie	4 × 400 m	DSQ		—N/a		did not advance	

* Competed in the heats only.

Field events

Athlete	Event	Qualification		Final	
Athlete	Event	Distance	Rank	Distance	Rank
Chukwuebuka Enekwechi	Shot put	20.66	2 Q	21.14	2nd place, silver medalist(s)
Eke Kalu	Shot put	17.62	12 q	17.86	12
Stephen Mozia	Discus throw	59.95	6 q	59.58	7
Samuel Kure	Javelin throw	73.49	15	did not advance	

Women
Track & road events

Athlete	Event	Heat		Semifinal		Final	
Athlete	Event	Result	Rank	Result	Rank	Result	Rank
Isoken Igbinosun	100 m	11.69	3 Q	11.85	7	did not advance	
Jennifer Madu	100 m	11.62	3 Q	11.59	5	did not advance	
Joy Udo-Gabriel	100 m	11.42	2 Q	11.53	4	did not advance	
Isoken Igbinosun	200 m	23.54	4 Q	24.03	7	did not advance	
Praise Idamadudu	200 m	23.55	4 Q	23.69	7	did not advance	
Folasade Abugan	400 m	DSQ		did not advance			
Yinka Ajayi	400 m	51.71	1 Q	51.81	2 Q	52.26	8
Patience Okon George	400 m	DSQ		did not advance			
Oluwatobiloba Amusan	100 m hurdles	12.73	1 Q	—N/a		12.68	1st place, gold medalist(s)
Grace Ayemoba	100 m hurdles	13.59	5	—N/a		did not advance	
Glory Onome Nathaniel	400 m hurdles	56.01	3 Q	—N/a		56.39	6
Rita Ossai	400 m hurdles	DNF		—N/a		did not advance	
Oluwatobiloba Amusan; Rosemary Chukwuma; Blessing Okagbare-Ighoteguonor; Joy Udo-Gabriel	4 × 100 m	—N/a				42.75	3rd place, bronze medalist(s)
Yinka Ajayi; Patience Okon George; Praise Idamadudu; Glory Onome Nathaniel	4 × 400 m	—N/a				3:25.29	2nd place, silver medalist(s)
Fadekemi Florence Olude	20 km walk	—N/a				1:49:31	10

Field events

Athlete	Event	Qualification		Final	
Athlete	Event	Distance	Rank	Distance	Rank
Precious Okoronkwor	Long jump	6.12	14	did not advance	
Blessing Ibrahim	Triple jump	—N/a		13.48	5
Doreen Amata	High jump	—N/a		1.80	10
Kelechi Nwanaga	Javelin throw	—N/a		53.17	6
Goodness Chinasa Duru	Javelin throw F46	—N/a		22.11	4
Queen Obisesan	Hammer throw	—N/a		63.84	5

== Basketball ==
Nigeria has qualified a men's basketball teams of 12 athletes. The team qualified after being ranked in the top three in the Commonwealth (besides the host nation, Australia).

=== Men's tournament ===
Roster

- God'sgift Achiuwa
- Azuoma Dike
- Ike Diogu
- Eli Dung
- Uchenna Iroegbu
- Yakubu Istifanus
- Uchechi Ofoegbu
- Olalekan Olatunji
- Prince Orizu
- Musa Usman
- Abdul Yahaya
- Abdulwahab Yakubu

Pool A

Team	Pld	W	L	PF	PA	PD	Pts	Qualification
Australia	3	3	0	271	183	+88	6	Semifinals
New Zealand	3	2	1	265	204	+61	5	Semifinals
Canada	3	1	2	197	244	−47	4	Qualifying finals
Nigeria	3	0	3	187	289	−102	3	Qualifying finals

6 April 2018
20:00

Boxscore

Nigeria	65–110	New Zealand
Scoring by quarter: 15–24, 20–26, 8–31, 22–29
Pts: Dike 15; Rebs: Achiuwa 8 Asts: Ofoegbu, Achiuwa 2		Pts: Abercrombie 21; Rebs: Pledger 10; Asts: Ili, Kenny 6

Cairns Convention Centre, Cairns
Referees: Liszka (POL), Kom Njilo (CMR),
Unsworth (GBR)

7 April 2018
14:00

Boxscore

Canada	82–67	Nigeria
Scoring by quarter: 23–16, 20–21, 14–15, 25–15
Pts: Diressa, Alleyn 24; Rebs: Tutu 6 Asts: Nissen 4		Pts: Diogu 29; Rebs: Diogu 15; Asts: Iroegbu, Diogu 3

Cairns Convention Centre, Cairns
Referees: Boyer (AUS), Kom Njilo (CMR),
Unsworth (GBR)

9 April 2018
21:00

Boxscore

Australia	97–55	Nigeria
Scoring by quarter: 23-17, 25-10, 28-14, 21-14
Pts: Brandt 16; Rebs: Cadee 9 Asts: Sobey 5		Pts: Diogu 19; Rebs: Achiuwa 8 Asts: Ofoegbu 3

Cairns Convention Centre, Cairns
Referees: Liszka (POL), Kom Njilo (CMR), Dodds (GBR)

Qualifying finals

10 April 2018
17:30

Boxscore

Nigeria	61–66	Scotland
Scoring by quarter: 16–23, 12–17, 18–6, 15–20
Pts: Diogu 24; Rebs: Diogu 15; Asts: Iroegbu, Ofoegbu 4		Pts: Murray 17; Rebs: Murray, Achara 8 Asts: Malcolm 4

Cairns Convention Centre, Cairns
Referees: Arnauld Kom Njilo (CMR), Artur Decastro (MOZ)

== Boxing ==
Nigeria participated with a team of 8 athletes (4 men and 4 women)

Men

Athlete	Event	Round of 32	Round of 16	Quarterfinals	Semifinals	Final	Rank
Athlete	Event	Opposition Result	Opposition Result	Opposition Result	Opposition Result	Opposition Result	Rank
Sikiru Ojo	−56 kg	—N/a	Samuel Addo (GHA); L 1-4	did not advance			
Adeola Soyoye	−60 kg	Thadius Katua (PNG); L 1-3	did not advance				
Osita Umeh	−69 kg	Manoj Kumar (IND); L 0-5	did not advance				
Lukmon Lawal	−81 kg	—N/a	Regarn Simbwa (UGA); L 1-4	did not advance			

Women

Athlete	Event	Round of 16	Quarterfinals	Semifinals	Final	Rank
Athlete	Event	Opposition Result	Opposition Result	Opposition Result	Opposition Result	Rank
Ayisat Oriyomi	−51 kg	—N/a	Carly McNaul (NIR); L ABD	did not advance		
Yetunde Odunuga	−60 kg	BYE	Caroline Veyre (CAN); W RSC	Paige Murney (ENG); L 1-4	Did not advance	3rd place, bronze medalist(s)
Itunu Oriola	−69 kg	BYE	Kaye Scott (AUS); L 0-5	did not advance		
Millicent Agboegbulem	−75 kg	Salote Huni (TGA); W 5-0	Elizabeth Andiego (KEN); W 5-0	Caitlin Parker (AUS); L 0-5	Did not advance	3rd place, bronze medalist(s)

== Gymnastics ==
=== Artistic ===
Nigeria participated with 1 athlete (1 man).

Men
Individual Qualification

Athlete	Event	Apparatus						Total	Rank
Athlete	Event	F	PH	R	V	PB	HB	Total	Rank
Tayo Fakiyesi	Qualification	7.650	—N/a		12.475	—N/a		—N/a	

=== Rhythmic ===
Nigeria participated with 1 athlete (1 woman).

Individual Qualification

Athlete	Event	Apparatus				Total	Rank
Athlete	Event	Hoop	Ball	Clubs	Ribbon	Total	Rank
Jade Faulkner	Qualification	9.800	8.500	9.500	6.000	33.800	24

== Table tennis ==
Nigeria participated with 7 athletes (6 men and 1 woman).

Singles

Athletes	Event	Group Stage			Round of 64	Round of 32	Round of 16	Quarterfinal	Semifinal	Final	Rank
Athletes	Event	Opposition Score	Opposition Score	Rank	Opposition Score	Opposition Score	Opposition Score	Opposition Score	Opposition Score	Opposition Score	Rank
Bode Abiodun	Men's singles	Benjamin (SLE); W 4 - 0	Takooa (KIR); W 4 - 0	1 Q	Cathcart (NIR); W 4 - 1	Pitchford (ENG); L 1 - 4	did not advance				
Quadri Aruna	Men's singles	Bye				Chan Yook Fo (MRI); W 4 - 0	Pang (SGP); W 4 - 1	Desai (IND); W 4 - 0	Kamal (IND); W 4 - 0	Gao (SGP); L 2 - 4	2nd place, silver medalist(s)
Segun Toriola	Men's singles	Bye				Wilson (TTO); W 4 - 1	Gnanasekaran (IND); L RET	did not advance			

Doubles

Athletes	Event	Round of 64	Round of 32	Round of 16	Quarterfinal	Semifinal	Final	Rank
Athletes	Event	Opposition Score	Opposition Score	Opposition Score	Opposition Score	Opposition Score	Opposition Score	Rank
Bode Abiodun; Olajide Omotayo	Men's doubles	Bye	Khawaja / Rameez (PAK); W 3 - 0	Drinkhall / Pitchford (ENG); L 0 - 3	did not advance			
Quadri Aruna; Segun Toriola	Men's doubles	Bye	Tomlinson / Watson (JAM); W 3 - 0	Choong / Leong (MAS); W 3 - 1	Pang / Poh (SGP); L 1 - 3	did not advance		

Team

Athletes	Event	Group Stage			Round of 16	Quarterfinal	Semifinal	Final	Rank
Athletes	Event	Opposition Score	Opposition Score	Rank	Opposition Score	Opposition Score	Opposition Score	Opposition Score	Rank
Bode Abiodun; Quadri Aruna; Azeez Jamiu; Olajide Omotayo; Segun Toriola	Men's team	Belize; W 3 - 0	Malaysia; W 3 - 1	1 Q	Bye	Australia; W 3 - 1	England; W 3 - 2	India; L 0 - 3	2nd place, silver medalist(s)

Para-sport

Athletes	Event	Group Stage				Semifinal	Final	Rank
Athletes	Event	Opposition Score	Opposition Score	Opposition Score	Rank	Opposition Score	Opposition Score	Rank
Temitope Ogunsanya	Men's TT6–10	Cogill (RSA); L 0 - 3	Mizrachi (AUS); L 0 - 3	Wilson (ENG); L 0 - 3	4	did not advance		
Faith Obazuaye	Women's TT6–10	McDonnell (AUS); W 3 - 0	Sutar (IND); W 3 - 0	Chan (CAN); W 3 - 0	1 Q	Pickard (ENG); W 3 - 0	Tapper (AUS); L 1 - 3	2nd place, silver medalist(s)

== Weightlifting ==
Nigeria participated with 4 athletes (2 men and 2 women).

Athlete	Event	Snatch		Clean & Jerk		Total	Rank
Athlete	Event	Result	Rank	Result	Rank	Total	Rank
Favour Agboro	Men's −62 kg	112	9	156	3	268	5
Michael Anyalewechi	Men's −85 kg	147	3	177	5	324	5
Monica Uweh	Women's −48 kg	66	5	88	4	154	5
Fatima Yakubu	Women's −53 kg	did not finish		did not start			

=== Powerlifting ===
Nigeria participated with 6 athletes (3 men and 3 women).

Athlete	Event	Result	Rank
Roland Ezuruike	Men's lightweight	224.3	1st place, gold medalist(s)
Paul Kehinde	Men's lightweight	219.9	2nd place, silver medalist(s)
Abdulazeez Ibrahim	Men's heavyweight	191.9	1st place, gold medalist(s)
Lucy Ejike	Women's lightweight	134.1	2nd place, silver medalist(s)
Esther Oyema	Women's lightweight	141.6	1st place, gold medalist(s)
Ndidi Nwosu	Women's heavyweight	110.4	1st place, gold medalist(s)

== Wrestling ==
Nigeria participated with 12 athletes (6 men and 6 women).

Repechage Format

Athlete	Event	Round of 16	Quarterfinal	Semifinal	Repechage	Final / BM	
Athlete	Event	Opposition Result	Opposition Result	Opposition Result	Opposition Result	Opposition Result	Rank
Ebikewenimo Welson	Men's -57 kg	Bye	Etko (SCO); W 4 - 0	Takahashi (CAN); L 0 - 5	Bye	Combrinck (RSA); W 3 - 1	3rd place, bronze medalist(s)
Amas Daniel	Men's -65 kg	van Rensburg (RSA); W 3 - 0	Punia (IND); L 0 - 4	Did not advance	Richards (NZL); W 4 - 0	de Marinis (CAN); W 3 - 1	3rd place, bronze medalist(s)
Ebimienfaghe Assizecourt	Men's -74 kg	Bye	Ali Amzad (BAN); W 4 - 0	Botha (RSA); L 0 - 5	Bye	Dodge (WAL); L 0 - 5	5
Melvin Bibo	Men's -86 kg	Bye	Conteh (SLE); W 5 - 0	Eslami (ENG); W 4 - 0	—N/a	Inam (PAK); L 0 - 3	2nd place, silver medalist(s)
Soso Tamarau	Men's -97 kg	Bye	Nyamsi Tchouga (CMR); W 4 - 1	Khatri (IND); L 1 - 3	Bye	Kaouslidis (CYP); L 1 - 3	5
Blessing Onyebuchi	Women's -76 kg	—N/a	Pariadhaven (MRI); W 4 - 0	Kiran (IND); W 4 - 0	—N/a	Wiebe (CAN); L 0 - 5	2nd place, silver medalist(s)

Group Stage Format

Athlete	Event	Group Stage				Semifinal	Final / BM	
Athlete	Event	Opposition Result	Opposition Result	Opposition Result	Rank	Opposition Result	Opposition Result	Rank
Odunayo Adekuoroye	Women's -57 kg	McDaid (NIR); W 4 - 0	Essombe Tiako (CMR); W 4 - 1	Genave (MRI); W 4 - 0	1 Q	Schaefer (CAN); W 4 - 0	Dhanda (IND); W 3 - 1	1st place, gold medalist(s)
Blessing Oborududu	Women's -68 kg	Nthiga (KEN); W 5 - 0	Sultana (BAN); W 5 - 0	—N/a	1 Q	Kakran (IND); W 4 - 1	Lappage (CAN); W 3 - 1	1st place, gold medalist(s)

Nordic Format

Athlete	Event	Nordic Round Robin				Rank
Athlete	Event	Opposition Result	Opposition Result	Opposition Result	Opposition Result	Rank
Sinivie Boltic	Men's -125 kg	Raza (PAK); L 0 - 5	Jarvis (CAN); L INJ	Kouamen Mbianga (CMR); NP	Malik (IND); L INJ	4
Mercy Genesis	Women's -50 kg	Phogat (IND); L 1 - 3	MacDonald (CAN); L 0 - 4	Kaur (AUS); W 4 - 0	—N/a	3
Bose Samuel	Women's −53 kg	Kumari (IND); L 1 - 3	Holland (AUS); W 4 - 0	Weicker (CAN); L 0 - 4	Dilhani (SRI); W 5 - 0	3rd place, bronze medalist(s)
Aminat Adeniyi	Women's -62 kg	Etane Ngolle (CMR); W 4 - 0	Malik (IND); W 3 - 1	Ford (NZL); W 4 - 0	Fazzari (CAN); W 5 - 0	1st place, gold medalist(s)

== See also ==
- Nigeria at the 2018 Winter Olympics
- Nigeria at the 2018 Summer Youth Olympics
