= Cameroon at the 2018 Commonwealth Games =

- Flag of Cameroon
- CG code: CMR
- CGA: National Olympic and Sports Committee of Cameroon
- Website: cnosc.com (in French)

in Gold Coast, Australia 4 April 2018 – 15 April 2018
- Competitors: 40 in 6 sports
- Medals Ranked 32nd: Gold 0 Silver 1 Bronze 2 Total 3

Commonwealth Games appearances (overview)
- 1998; 2002; 2006; 2010; 2014; 2018; 2022; 2026; 2030

Cameroon competed at the 2018 Commonwealth Games in the Gold Coast, Australia from April 4 to April 15, 2018. It was Cameroon's 6th appearance at the Commonwealth Games. During the games, eight athletes went missing from their accommodation, with them all being reported to the Australian police.

== Medalists ==
Medal	Name	Sport	Event	Date
Silver	Wilfried Ntsengue	Boxing	Men's −75 kg	April 14
Bronze	Clementine Noumbissi	Weightlifting	Women's −90 kg	April 9
Bronze	Marcel Mayack II	Athletics	Men's Triple Jump	April 14

== Competitors ==
The following is the list of number of competitors participating at the Games per sport/discipline.

Sport	Men	Women	Total
Athletics	1	6	7
Badminton	1	1	2
Basketball	12	0	12
Boxing	5	3	8
Weightlifting	3	2	5
Wrestling	2	4	6
Total	24	16	40

== Athletics ==
Men
Field events

Athlete	Event	Qualification		Final	
Athlete	Event	Distance	Position	Distance	Position
Marcel Mayack II	Long jump	7.84	9 q	7.70	11
Marcel Mayack II	Triple jump	16.32	6 q	16.80	3rd place, bronze medalist(s)

Women
Track & road events

Athlete	Event	Heat		Semifinal		Final	
Athlete	Event	Result	Rank	Result	Rank	Result	Rank
Charifa Abdoullahi Labarang	100 m	DNF		did not advance			
Fanny Appes Ekanga	100 m	12.15	5	did not advance			
Marie Eleme	100 m	11.88	4	did not advance			
Charifa Abdoullahi Labarang	200 m	DNS		did not advance			
Germaine Abessolo Bivina	200 m	23.77 PB	6 q	24.05	8	did not advance	
Irene Bell Bonong	200 m	24.56	6	did not advance			
Germaine Abessolo Bivina; Fanny Appes Ekanga; Irene Bell Bonong; Marie Eleme	4 × 100 m	—N/a				45.24	6

Field events

Athlete	Event	Qualification		Final	
Athlete	Event	Distance	Position	Distance	Position
Joelle Mbumi Nkouindjin	Long jump	6.02	15	did not advance	
Joelle Mbumi Nkouindjin	Triple jump	—N/a		13.45	7

== Badminton ==
Cameroon participated with 2 athletes (1 man and 1 woman)

Athlete	Event	Round of 64	Round of 32	Round of 16	Quarterfinal	Semifinal	Final / BM	
Athlete	Event	Opposition Score	Opposition Score	Opposition Score	Opposition Score	Opposition Score	Opposition Score	Rank
Antoine Owona Ndimako	Men's singles	Naim Mohammed (TTO); L 0-2	did not advance					
Stella Ngadjui	Women's singles	Rachael Darragh (NIR); L 0-2	did not advance					

== Basketball ==
Cameroon qualified a men's basketball team of 12 athletes. The team was invited by FIBA and the CGF. The country will make its Commonwealth Games debut at the games. Cameroon did not compete in the sport at its only appearance in 2006 in Melbourne.

=== Men's tournament ===
Roster

- Ebaku Akumenzoh
- Christian Ayangma Bemouyime
- Simon Bileg II
- Felix Bogmis
- Pierre Cedric Essome
- Arnold Kome
- Boseme Mukete Njemo
- Kevin Ngwese
- Mohaman Aziz Nkene Tsaace
- Yannick Seulle
- Robert Songolo Ngijol
- Franck Yangue

Pool B

Team	Pld	W	L	PF	PA	PD	Pts	Qualification
Scotland	3	3	0	237	198	+39	6	Qualifying finals
England	3	2	1	246	186	+60	5	Qualifying finals
Cameroon	3	1	2	202	231	−29	4	
India	3	0	3	222	292	−70	3	

5 April 2018
20:00

Boxscore

Cameroon	96–87	India
Scoring by quarter: 15–27, 24–36, 23–13, 34–11
Pts: Kome 21; Rebs: Tsaace 13; Asts: Ngijol 3		Pts: At. Singh 23; Rebs: Annadurai 12; Asts: J. Singh 8

Townsville Entertainment and Convention Centre, Townsville
Referees: Michael Weiland (CAN), Ryan Jones (NZL)

7 April 2018
20:00

Boxscore

Scotland	63–52	Cameroon
Scoring by quarter: 15–4, 14–11, 15–25, 19–12
Pts: Murray 25; Rebs: Fraser 9 Asts: Achara, Murray 3		Pts: Kome 21; Rebs: Yangue 13; Asts: Essome 5

Townsville Entertainment and Convention Centre, Townsville
Referees: Leonardo Zalazar (ARG), Jon Chapman (AUS)

8 April 2018
14:00

Boxscore

Cameroon	54–81	England
Scoring by quarter: 15-20, 16-17, 14-29, 9-15
Pts: Bogmis 14; Rebs: Yangue 10; Asts: Essome 3		Pts: Josephs 26; Rebs: Jackman 8 Asts: Thoseby, Tuck 3

Townsville Entertainment and Convention Centre, Townsville
Referees: Leonardo Zalazar (ARG), Matthew Beattie (AUS)

== Boxing ==
Cameroon participated with a team of 8 athletes (5 men and 3 women)

Men

Athlete	Event	Round of 32	Round of 16	Quarterfinals	Semifinals	Final	Rank
Athlete	Event	Opposition Result	Opposition Result	Opposition Result	Opposition Result	Opposition Result	Rank
Simplice Fotsala	−49 kg	—N/a	Yafai (ENG); L 0 - 5	did not advance			
Wilfried Ntsengue	−75 kg	Anthony (LCA); W 5 - 0	Lawson (GHA); W 4 - 1	Scaife (NZL); W 5 - 0	Docherty (SCO); W 5 - 0	Yadav (IND); L 0 - 5	2nd place, silver medalist(s)
Ulrich Yombo	−81 kg	—N/a	Bye	O'Reilly (CAN); L W/O	did not advance		
Christian Ndzie Tsoye	−91 kg	—N/a	Bye	Nyika (NZL); L W/O	did not advance		
Arsene Fokou Fosso	+91 kg	—N/a	Kei (TGA); W 5 - 0	Agnes (SEY); L 1 - 4	did not advance		

Women

Athlete	Event	Round of 16	Quarterfinals	Semifinals	Final	Rank
Athlete	Event	Opposition Result	Opposition Result	Opposition Result	Opposition Result	Rank
Christelle Ndiang	−57 kg	Bye	Nicholson (AUS); L 0 - 5	did not advance		
Aubiege Azangue	−69 kg	Eccles (WAL); L 1 - 4	did not advance			
Clotilde Essiane	−75 kg	Bye	Thibeault (CAN); L 2 - 3	did not advance		

== Weightlifting ==
Cameroon participated with 5 athletes (3 men and 2 women).

Athlete	Event	Snatch		Clean & Jerk		Total	Rank
Athlete	Event	Result	Rank	Result	Rank	Total	Rank
Olivier Matam	Men's −62 kg	113	7	145	7	258	8
Donald Nkoh	Men's −85 kg	140	5	186	2	326	4
Petit Minkoumba	Men's −94 kg	142	8	175	6	317	6
Arcangeline Fouodji	Women's −69 kg	80	9	100	8	180	9
Clementine Noumbissi	Women's −90 kg	101	3	125	3	226	3rd place, bronze medalist(s)

== Wrestling ==
Cameroon participated with 6 athletes (2 men and 4 women).

Repechage Format

Athlete	Event	Round of 16	Quarterfinal	Semifinal	Repechage	Final / BM	
Athlete	Event	Opposition Result	Opposition Result	Opposition Result	Opposition Result	Opposition Result	Rank
Cedric Nyamsi Tchouga	Men's -97 kg	Bye	Tamarau (NGR); L 1 - 4	did not advance			8
Danielle Sino Guemde	Women's -76 kg	—N/a	Kiran (IND); L 1 - 4	Did not advance	—N/a	Did not advance	8

Group Stage Format

Athlete	Event	Group Stage				Semifinal	Final / BM	
Athlete	Event	Opposition Result	Opposition Result	Opposition Result	Rank	Opposition Result	Opposition Result	Rank
Joseph Essombe	Women's -57 kg	Genave (MRI); W 5 - 0	Adekuoroye (NGR); L 1 - 4	McDaid (NIR); W 5 - 0	2 Q	Dhanda (IND); L 1 - 3	Schaefer (CAN); L 1 - 4	4
Gaelle Alakame Anzong	Women's -68 kg	Lappage (CAN); L 0 - 4	Kakran (IND); L 0 - 5	—N/a	3	did not advance		5

Nordic Format

Athlete	Event	Nordic Round Robin				Rank
Athlete	Event	Opposition Result	Opposition Result	Opposition Result	Opposition Result	Rank
Claude Kouamen Mbianga	Men's -125 kg	Jarvis (CAN); L 0 - 4	Malik (IND); L INJ	Raza (PAK); L INJ	Boltic (NGR); NP	5
Berthe Etane Ngolle	Women's -62 kg	Malik (IND); L 0 - 4	Adeniyi (NGR); L 0 - 4	Ford (NZL); L 0 - 5	Fazzari (CAN); L 0 - 3	5

== See also ==
- Cameroon at the 2018 Summer Youth Olympics
