= Para powerlifting at the 2014 Commonwealth Games =

- Venue: Scottish Exhibition and Conference Centre
- Location: Glasgow, Scotland
- Dates: 24 July to 2 August 2014

Para powerlifting at the 2014 Commonwealth Games was the inaugural appearance of Para powerlifting at the Commonwealth Games. Para powerlifting competition at the 2014 Commonwealth Games was held in Glasgow, Scotland between 24 July and 2 August at the Scottish Exhibition and Conference Centre.

== Medallists ==
| Event | Gold | Silver | Bronze |
|---|---|---|---|
| Men's 72 kg | Paul Kehinde; Nigeria | Rolland Ezuruike; Nigeria | Ali Jawad; England |
| Men's +72 kg | Abdulazeez Ibrahim; Nigeria | Rajinder Rahelu; India | Jong Yee Khie; Malaysia |
| Women's 61 kg | Esther Oyema; Nigeria | Natalie Blake; England | Sakina Khatun; India |
| Women's +61 kg | Loveline Obiji; Nigeria | Bose Omolayo; Nigeria | Joyce Wambui Njuguna; Kenya |
