= Wrestling at the 2018 Commonwealth Games =

Sports Event

- Venue: Carrara Sports and Leisure Centre
- Location: Gold Coast, Australi
- Dates: 12 to 14 April 2018
- Competitors: 105 from 23 nations

Wrestling at the 2018 Commonwealth Games was the 18th appearance of Wrestling at the Commonwealth Games. The wrestling competition at the 2018 Commonwealth Games was held in Gold Coast, Australia, between 12 and 14 April 2018, at the Carrara Sports and Leisure Centre.

== Medal table ==
Rank	Nation	Gold	Silver	Bronze	Total
1	India	5	3	4	12
2	Nigeria	3	2	3	8
3	Canada	2	5	3	10
4	South Africa	1	1	0	2
5	Pakistan	1	0	2	3
6	Wales	0	1	1	2
7	England	0	0	3	3
8	Cyprus	0	0	1	1
Totals (8 entries)		12	12	17	41

== Medal summary ==
=== Men's freestyle ===
Event	Gold	Silver	Bronze
57 kg	Rahul Aware; India	Steven Takahashi; Canada	Ebikewenimo Welson; Nigeria
57 kg	Rahul Aware; India	Steven Takahashi; Canada	Muhammad Bilal; Pakistan
65 kg	Bajrang Punia; India	Kane Charig; Wales	Amas Daniel; Nigeria
65 kg	Bajrang Punia; India	Kane Charig; Wales	Charlie Bowling; England
74 kg	Sushil Kumar; India	Johanes Botha; South Africa	Curtis Dodge; Wales
74 kg	Sushil Kumar; India	Johanes Botha; South Africa	Jevon Balfour; Canada
86 kg	Muhammad Inam; Pakistan	Melvin Bibo; Nigeria	Syerus Eslami; England
86 kg	Muhammad Inam; Pakistan	Melvin Bibo; Nigeria	Somveer Kadian; India
97 kg	Martin Erasmus; South Africa	Mausam Khatri; India	Jordan Steen; Canada
97 kg	Martin Erasmus; South Africa	Mausam Khatri; India	Alexios Kaouslidis; Cyprus
125 kg	Sumit Malik; India	Korey Jarvis; Canada	Tayab Raza; Pakistan

=== Women's freestyle ===
Event	Gold	Silver	Bronze
50 kg	Vinesh Phogat; India	Jessica MacDonald; Canada	Not awarded as there were only 4 competitors.
53 kg	Diana Weicker; Canada	Babita Kumari; India	Bose Samuel; Nigeria
57 kg	Odunayo Adekuoroye; Nigeria	Pooja Dhanda; India	Emily Schaefer; Canada
62 kg	Aminat Adeniyi; Nigeria	Michelle Fazzari; Canada	Sakshi Malik; India
68 kg	Blessing Oborududu; Nigeria	Danielle Lappage; Canada	Divya Kakran; India
76 kg	Erica Wiebe; Canada	Blessing Onyebuchi; Nigeria	Georgina Nelthorpe; England
76 kg	Erica Wiebe; Canada	Blessing Onyebuchi; Nigeria	Kiran Bishnoi; India

== Participating nations ==
There are 23 participating nations in wrestling with a total of 105 wrestlers.

- Australia (8 athletes)
- Bahamas (2)
- Bangladesh (2)
- Cameroon (6)
- Canada (12)
- Cyprus (1)
- England (5)
- India (12)
- Jamaica (1)
- Kenya (2)
- Kiribati (2)
- Malta (3)
- Mauritius (4)
- Nauru (2)
- New Zealand (7)
- Nigeria (12)
- Northern Ireland (1)
- Pakistan (6)
- Scotland (4)
- Sierra Leone (3)
- South Africa (5)
- Sri Lanka (3)
- Wales (2)
