= Chronological summary of the 2018 Commonwealth Games =

The 2018 Commonwealth Games (officially the XXI Commonwealth Games) are being held in Gold Coast, Australia, from 4 to 15 April 2018.

This article contains a chronological summary of major events from the Games.

== Calendar ==
OC	Opening ceremony	●	Event competitions	1	Gold medal events	CC	Closing ceremony

April 2018		4th Wed	5th Thu	6th Fri	7th Sat	8th Sun	9th Mon	10th Tue	11th Wed	12th Thu	13th Fri	14th Sat	15th Sun	Events
Ceremonies		OC											CC	—
Aquatics	Diving								3	2	3	2		60
Aquatics	Swimming		7	9	8	8	9	9						60
Athletics						5	6	8	7	10	9	9	4	58
Badminton			●	●	●	●	1	●	●	●	●	●	5	6
Basketball			●	●	●	●	●	●			●	1	1	2
Beach volleyball				●	●	●	●	●	●	2				2
Boxing			●	●	●	●	●	●	●		●	16		16
Cycling
Cycling	Mountain biking									2				26
Cycling	Road cycling							2				2		26
Cycling	Track cycling		6	4	6	4								26
Gymnastics
Gymnastics	Artistic		1	1	2	5	5							20
Gymnastics	Rhythmic								1	1	4			20
Hockey			●	●	●	●	●	●	●	●	●	2		2
Lawn bowls			●	●	●	2	2	●	1	2	3			10
Netball			●	●	●	●	●	●	●	●		●	1	1
Para powerlifting								4						4
Rugby sevens											●	●	2	2
Shooting						3	3	3	3	1	3	3		19
Squash			●	●	●	●	2	●	●	●	●	1	2	5
Table tennis			●	●	●	1	1	●	●	●	1	4	2	9
Triathlon			2		3									5
Weightlifting			3	3	3	3	4							16
Wrestling										4	4	4		12
Daily medal events			19	17	22	31	33	26	15	24	27	44	17	275
Cumulative total			19	36	58	89	122	148	163	187	214	258	275	275
April 2018		4th Wed	5th Thu	6th Fri	7th Sat	8th Sun	9th Mon	10th Tue	11th Wed	12th Thu	13th Fri	14th Sat	15th Sun	Total events

== Day 0 — Wednesday 4 April ==
4 April 2018

Opening ceremony

- The opening ceremony was held at Carrara Stadium at 19:00 AEST (UTC+10).

== Day 1 — Thursday 5 April ==
=== Detailed results (day 1) ===
5 April 2018 — detailed results

=== Summary table (day 1) ===
5 April 2018 — summary table
