= Wrestling at the 2018 Commonwealth Games – Men's freestyle 65 kg =

Wrestling – Men's freestyle 65 kg at the 2018 Commonwealth Games
- Venue: Carrara Sports and Leisure Centre
- Dates: 13 April 2018
- Competitors: 12 from 12 nations

Medalists
gold medal	Bajrang Punia	India
silver medal	Kane Charig	Wales
bronze medal	Charlie Bowling	England
bronze medal	Amas Daniel	Nigeria

The men's 65 kg freestyle wrestling competition at the 2018 Commonwealth Games in Gold Coast, Australia was held on 13 April at the Carrara Sports and Leisure Centre.

This freestyle wrestling competition consists of a single-elimination tournament, with a repechage used to determine the winner of two bronze medals. The two finalists face off for gold and silver medals. Each wrestler who loses to one of the two finalists moves into the repechage, culminating in a pair of bronze medal matches featuring the semifinal losers each facing the remaining repechage opponent from their half of the bracket.

== Results ==
- F — Won by fall

=== Main bracket ===
Round of 16
Brahm Richards (NZL)	0
Bajrang Punia (IND)	10
Terry van Rensburg (RSA)	0
Amas Daniel (NGR)	9
Adam Vella (MLT)	2
Abdul Wahab (PAK)	12
Vincent De Marinis (CAN)	12
Mehrdad Tarash (AUS)	1

Quarterfinals
Charlie Bowling (ENG)	0
Kane Charig (WAL)	10
Maverick Kun (NRU)	0
Jean Bandou (MRI)	10
Bajrang Punia (IND)	10
Amas Daniel (NGR)	0
Abdul Wahab (PAK)	0
Vincent De Marinis (CAN)	10

Semifinals
Kane Charig (WAL)	10
Jean Bandou (MRI)	0
Bajrang Punia (IND)	10
Vincent De Marinis (CAN)	0

Final
Kane Charig (WAL)	0
Bajrang Punia (IND)	10

=== Repechage ===
Repechage first round
Brahm Richards (NZL)	0
Amas Daniel (NGR)	10

Bronze medal match
Charlie Bowling (ENG)	10
Jean Bandou (MRI)	0
Amas Daniel (NGR)	4
Vincent De Marinis (CAN)	4
