= Para powerlifting at the 2018 Commonwealth Games – Women's lightweight =

Para powerlifting – Women's lightweight at the 2018 Commonwealth Games
- Venue: Carrara Sports and Leisure Centre
- Dates: 10 April
- Competitors: 7 from 5 nations
- Winning points: 141.6

Medalists
gold medal	Esther Oyema	Nigeria
silver medal	Lucy Ejike	Nigeria
bronze medal	Zoe Newson	England

The Women's lightweight powerlifting event at the 2018 Commonwealth Games took place at the Carrara Sports and Leisure Centre on 10 April 2018.

== Result ==
Rank	Athlete	Body weight	#1	#2	#3	Result
1st place, gold medalist(s)	Esther Oyema (NGR)	48.10	125	~~131~~	131 WR	141.6
2nd place, silver medalist(s)	Lucy Ejike (NGR)	56.00	133	~~139~~	~~139~~	134.1
3rd place, bronze medalist(s)	Zoe Newson (ENG)	41.00	88	91	~~94~~	106.1
4	Hellen Kariuki (KEN)	38.60	80	~~85~~	~~88~~	96.0
5	Sakina Khatun (IND)	43.20	82	~~85~~	~~86~~	93.2
6	Natalie Blake (ENG)	54.80	70	74	~~76~~	77.4
7	Kelly Cartwright (AUS)	47.00	58	62	64	69.9
