= Wrestling at the 2018 Commonwealth Games – Women's freestyle 62 kg =

Wrestling – Women's freestyle 62 kg at the 2018 Commonwealth Games
- Venue: Carrara Sports and Leisure Centre
- Dates: 14 April 2018
- Competitors: 5 from 5 nations

Medalists
gold medal	Aminat Adeniyi	Nigeria
silver medal	Michelle Fazzari	Canada
bronze medal	Sakshi Malik	India

The women's freestyle 62 kg freestyle wrestling competition at the 2018 Commonwealth Games in Gold Coast, Australia was held on 14 April at the Carrara Sports and Leisure Centre.

== Results ==
As there were less than 6 competitors entered in this event, the competition was contested as a Nordic round with each athlete playing every other athlete. The medallists were determined by the standings after the completion of the Nordic round.

Legend

- F — Won by fall
- R — Retired

=== Nordic group ===
Pos	Athlete	Pld	W	L	CP	TP
1	Aminat Adeniyi (NGR)	4	4	0	16	32
2	Michelle Fazzari (CAN)	4	3	1	10	31
3	Sakshi Malik (IND)	4	2	2	9	27
4	Tayla Ford (NZL)	4	1	3	7	16
5	Berthe Etane Ngolle (CMR)	4	0	4	0	0

Source: UWW

	Score		CP
Berthe Etane Ngolle (CMR)	0–10	Sakshi Malik (IND)	0–4 VSU
Michelle Fazzari (CAN)	14–4	Tayla Ford (NZL)	4–1 VSU1
Aminat Adeniyi (NGR)	11–0	Berthe Etane Ngolle (CMR)	4–0 VSU
Sakshi Malik (IND)	8–11	Michelle Fazzari (CAN)	1–3 VPO1
Tayla Ford (NZL)	7–0 Fall	Berthe Etane Ngolle (CMR)	5–0 VFA
Aminat Adeniyi (NGR)	6–3	Sakshi Malik (IND)	3–1 VPO1
Michelle Fazzari (CAN)	6–0	Berthe Etane Ngolle (CMR)	3–0 VPO
Tayla Ford (NZL)	0–11	Aminat Adeniyi (NGR)	0–4 VSU
Michelle Fazzari (CAN)	0–4 Ret	Aminat Adeniyi (NGR)	0–5 VIN
Sakshi Malik (IND)	6–5	Tayla Ford (NZL)	3–1 VPO1
