= Wrestling at the 2019 African Games =

- Venue: Salle Omnisport
- Location: El Jadida, Morocco
- Dates: 28–30 August
- Competitors: 156 from 20 nations

Wrestling at the 2019 African Games was held from 28 to 30 August 2019 in El Jadida, Morocco.

== Medal table ==
* Host nation (Morocco)

Rank	Nation	Gold	Silver	Bronze	Total
1	Nigeria (NGR)	7	4	1	12
2	Egypt (EGY)	5	4	6	15
3	Algeria (ALG)	4	1	5	10
4	Tunisia (TUN)	1	4	4	9
5	Cameroon (CMR)	1	1	2	4
6	Morocco (MAR)*	0	1	3	4
7	Ivory Coast (CIV)	0	1	1	2
7	Senegal (SEN)	0	1	1	2
9	Guinea-Bissau (GBS)	0	1	0	1
10	Democratic Republic of the Congo (COD)	0	0	2	2
11	Guinea (GUI)	0	0	1	1
11	Republic of the Congo (CGO)	0	0	1	1
Totals (12 entries)		18	18	27	63

== Medal summary ==
=== Men's freestyle ===
Event	Gold	Silver	Bronze
57 kg	Abdelhak Kherbache; Algeria	Ebikewenimo Welson; Nigeria	Chakir Ansari; Morocco
57 kg	Abdelhak Kherbache; Algeria	Ebikewenimo Welson; Nigeria	Gamal Mohamed; Egypt
65 kg	Amas Daniel; Nigeria	Mbunde Cumba; Guinea-Bissau	Amr Reda Hussen; Egypt
65 kg	Amas Daniel; Nigeria	Mbunde Cumba; Guinea-Bissau	Kaireddine Ben Telili; Tunisia
74 kg	Ogbonna John; Nigeria	Samy Moustafa; Egypt	Maher Ghanmi; Tunisia
74 kg	Ogbonna John; Nigeria	Samy Moustafa; Egypt	Jean Bernard Diatta; Senegal
86 kg	Ayoub Barraj; Tunisia	Fateh Benferdjallah; Algeria	Cedric Abossolo; Cameroon
86 kg	Ayoub Barraj; Tunisia	Fateh Benferdjallah; Algeria	Khaled El-Moatamadawi; Egypt
97 kg	Hosam Mohamed Merghany; Egypt	Soso Tamarau; Nigeria	Aron Mbo; Democratic Republic of the Congo
97 kg	Hosam Mohamed Merghany; Egypt	Soso Tamarau; Nigeria	Mohammed Fardj; Algeria
125 kg	Khaled Abdalla; Egypt	Sinivie Boltic; Nigeria	Anas Lamkabber; Morocco

=== Men's Greco-Roman ===
Event	Gold	Silver	Bronze
60 kg	Haithem Mahmoud; Egypt	Fouad Fajari; Morocco	Abdennour Laouni; Algeria
67 kg	Mohamed Elsayed; Egypt	Souleymen Nasr; Tunisia	Abdelmalek Merabet; Algeria
77 kg	Abdelkrim Ouakali; Algeria	Mohamed Zahab Khalil; Egypt	Zied Ait Ouagram; Morocco
87 kg	Bachir Sid Azara; Algeria	Mohamed Missaoui; Tunisia	Mohamed Metwally; Egypt
87 kg	Bachir Sid Azara; Algeria	Mohamed Missaoui; Tunisia	Tochukwu Okeke; Nigeria
97 kg	Adem Boudjemline; Algeria	Noureldin Hassan; Egypt	Aron Mbo; Democratic Republic of the Congo
130 kg	Abdellatif Mohamed; Egypt	Amine Guennichi; Tunisia	Hamza Haloui; Algeria

=== Women's freestyle ===
Event	Gold	Silver	Bronze
50 kg	Mercy Genesis; Nigeria	Sarra Hamdi; Tunisia	N'de Caroline Yapi; Ivory Coast
50 kg	Mercy Genesis; Nigeria	Sarra Hamdi; Tunisia	Ibtissem Doudou; Algeria
53 kg	Joseph Essombe; Cameroon	Bose Samuel; Nigeria	Faten Hammami; Tunisia
57 kg	Odunayo Adekuoroye; Nigeria	Eman Guda Ebrahim; Egypt	Noelle Mbouma Nandzo; Republic of the Congo
57 kg	Odunayo Adekuoroye; Nigeria	Eman Guda Ebrahim; Egypt	Siwar Bousetta; Tunisia
62 kg	Aminat Adeniyi; Nigeria	Berthe Etane Ngolle; Cameroon	Fatoumata Camara; Guinea
68 kg	Blessing Oborududu; Nigeria	Anta Sambou; Senegal	Blandine Ngiri; Cameroon
68 kg	Blessing Oborududu; Nigeria	Anta Sambou; Senegal	Samar Amer; Egypt
76 kg	Blessing Onyebuchi; Nigeria	Amy Youin; Ivory Coast	Mona Ahmed; Egypt

Egyptian Hala Ahmed, who competed in the 50 kg event, was convicted of doping. Her bronze medal went to Ibtissem Doudou.

== Participating nations ==
- Algeria (15)
- Burkina Faso (4)
- Cameroon (6)
- Chad (9)
- Republic of the Congo (2)
- Democratic Republic of the Congo (13)
- Egypt (18)
- Guinea (3)
- Guinea-Bissau (3)
- Ivory Coast (10)
- Kenya (10)
- Madagascar (2)
- Mauritius (4)
- Morocco (11)
- Namibia (2)
- Nigeria (16)
- Senegal (8)
- Sierra Leone (4)
- Sudan (3)
- Tunisia (13)
