= Para powerlifting at the 2018 Commonwealth Games – Men's lightweight =

Para powerlifting – Men's lightweight at the 2018 Commonwealth Games
- Venue: Carrara Sports and Leisure Centre
- Dates: 10 April
- Competitors: 11 from 8 nations
- Winning points: 224.3

Medalists
gold medal	Roland Ezuruike	Nigeria
silver medal	Paul Kehinde	Nigeria
bronze medal	Ali Jawad	England

The Men's lightweight powerlifting event at the 2018 Commonwealth Games took place at the Carrara Sports and Leisure Centre on 10 April 2018.

== Result ==
Rank	Athlete	Body weight	#1	#2	#3	Result
1st place, gold medalist(s)	Roland Ezuruike (NGR)	50.60	188	194	~~202~~	224.3
2nd place, silver medalist(s)	Paul Kehinde (NGR)	62.70	211	~~221~~	~~222.5~~	219.9
3rd place, bronze medalist(s)	Ali Jawad (ENG)	52.50	155	159	161	182.7
4	Bonnie Bunyau Gustin (MAS)	65.20	155	161	166	169.8
5	Farman Basha (IND)	46.20	~~138~~	140	~~150~~	169.4
6	Oliver Brown (ENG)	64.80	160	~~163~~	~~165~~	164.2
7	Gabriel Wanjiku (KEN)	64.60	~~130~~	135	140	143.8
8	Nang Nguyen (AUS)	58.40	132	~~137~~	~~137~~	142.3
9	Vedaste Niyonzima (RWA)	57.50	130	~~135~~	~~135~~	141.2
10	Nathan Stephens (WAL)	71.50	133	~~138~~	140	137.2
	Ashok (IND)	59.00	~~160~~	~~160~~	~~171~~	–
