= Aminat =

Aminat is a given name. Notable people with the name include:

- Aminat Adeniyi (born 1993), Nigerian wrestler
- Aminat Yusuf Jamal (born 1997), Nigerian-born Bahraini athlete
