= Para powerlifting at the 2018 Commonwealth Games – Women's heavyweight =

Para powerlifting – Women's heavyweight at the 2018 Commonwealth Games
- Venue: Carrara Sports and Leisure Centre
- Dates: 10 April
- Competitors: 4 from 4 nations
- Winning points: 110.4

Medalists
gold medal	Ndidi Nwosu	Nigeria
silver medal	Louise Sugden	England

The Women's heavyweight powerlifting event at the 2018 Commonwealth Games took place at the Carrara Sports and Leisure Centre on 10 April 2018.

== Result ==
Rank	Athlete	Body weight	#1	#2	#3	Result
1st place, gold medalist(s)	Ndidi Nwosu (NGR)	69.10	110	120	~~125~~	110.4
2nd place, silver medalist(s)	Louise Sugden (ENG)	79.80	97	101	103	89.2
3	Joyce Njuguna (KEN)	76.50	95	~~99~~	101	89.0
4	Nerys Pearce (WAL)	65.38	75	~~80~~	~~80~~	70.7
