= Kelly Cartwright =

Australian Paralympic athlete (born 1989)

Kelly Cartwright OAM
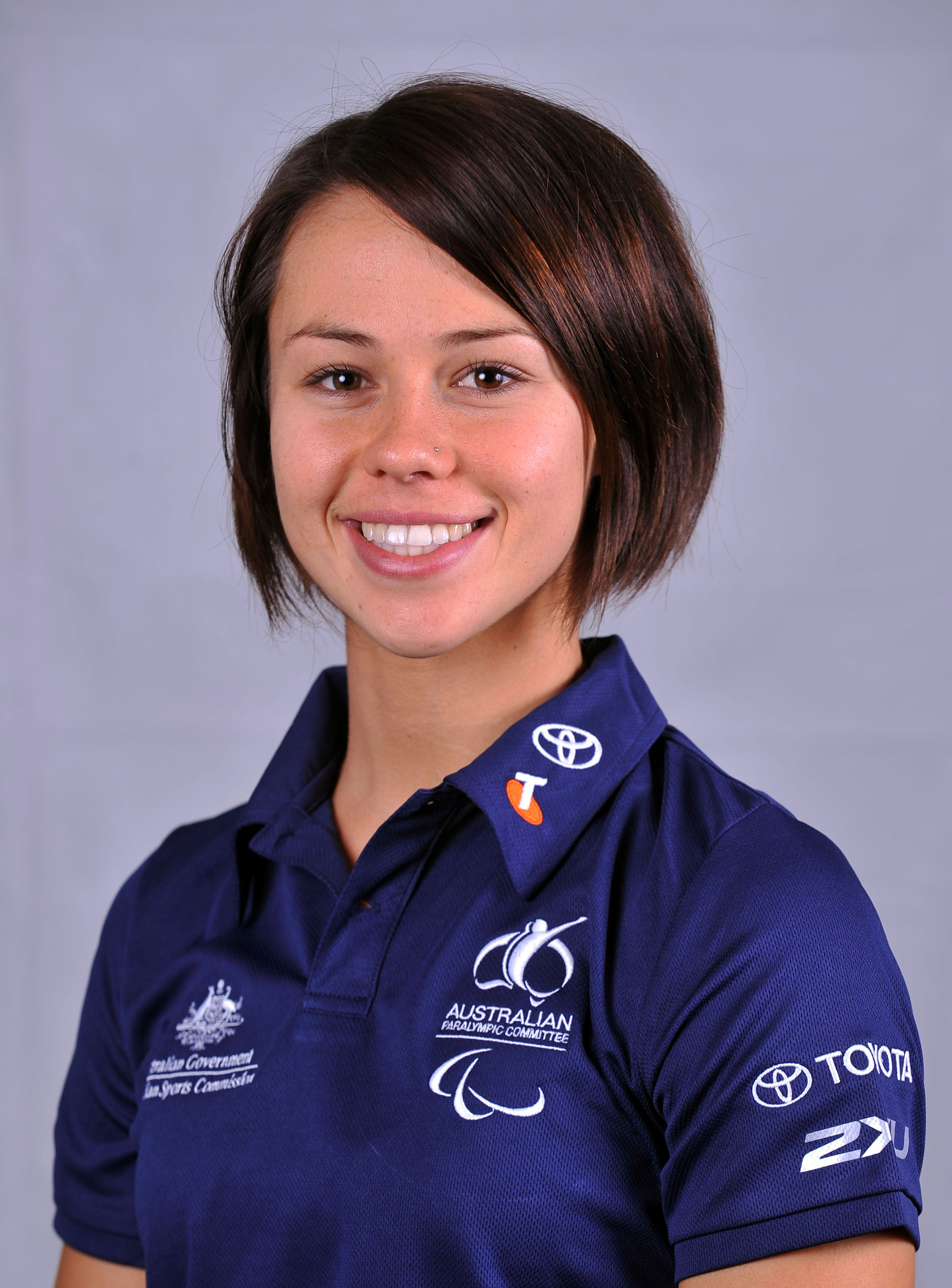
- Portrait for the London 2012 Paralympics

Personal information
- Nationality: Australian
- Born: 22 April 1989 (age 37)

Sport
- Country: Australia
- Sport: Athletics
Medal record
Women's para athletics
Representing Australia
Paralympic Games
Gold medal – first place	2012 London	Long jump F42/44
Silver medal – second place	2012 London	100 m T42
IPC Athletics World Championships
Gold medal – first place	2011 Christchurch	100 m T42
Gold medal – first place	2011 Christchurch	Long jump T42

Kelly Cartwright OAM (born 22 April 1989) is an Australian athlete and powerlifter. She won two medals at the London 2012 Paralympics, and represented Australia in the Beijing 2008 Paralympics.

== Personal ==
Kelly Anne Cartwright was born on 22 April 1989 and is from Geelong. When she was fifteen she had a form of cancer called synovial sarcoma. Part of her right leg needed to be amputated due to the cancer because chemotherapy was not an option. She has a prosthetic leg that she started using in high school. Her regular walking leg cost A$62,000 and needed to be charged every night. Before losing her leg she played netball. Cartwright climbed Mount Kilimanjaro in 2009. As of 2012 she worked as a receptionist. She is also an ambassador for the Australian Paralympic Committee and Make-A-Wish Foundation. In 2012 she was named one of Zoo Weekly's sexiest Paralympian.

Cartwright appeared on the fifteenth season of Dancing with the Stars. In 2016 Cartwright and her partner, Ryan, became parents to a son.

== Athletics ==
Cartwright is a T42 classified runner and is coached by Tim Matthews. In 2008, she was awarded a scholarship with the Australian Institute of Sport and in 2012 had a scholarship with the Victorian Institute of Sport.

Cartwright started competing in 2007 and first represented Australia in 2008 at the 2008 Beijing Paralympics. Making the 100-metre finals, she finished sixth racing on a carbon fibre leg. Going into the Games, she trained in Geelong. She competed in the 2011 IPC Athletics World Championships where she finished first while setting a world record in the 100 m event. At the 2012 Australian Athletics Championships, she set a world record of 16.26 seconds in the 100 m T42 event. In 2012 she was the world champion in the T42 100 m and long jump events. At the 2012 London Paralympics she won a gold medal in the Women's Long Jump F42/44 event and a silver medal in the Women's 100 m T42 event.

== Powerlifting ==
Cartwright changed sports to para powerlifting due to a serious ankle injury after the 2012 Paralympics. She competed at the 2018 Commonwealth Games where she came 7th in the lightweight event.

== Recognition ==
Cartwright was a finalist for the 2012 Australian Paralympian of the Year. She was awarded an Order of Australia Medal in the 2014 Australia Day Honours "for service to sport as a Gold Medallist at the London 2012 Paralympic Games."

== Gallery ==
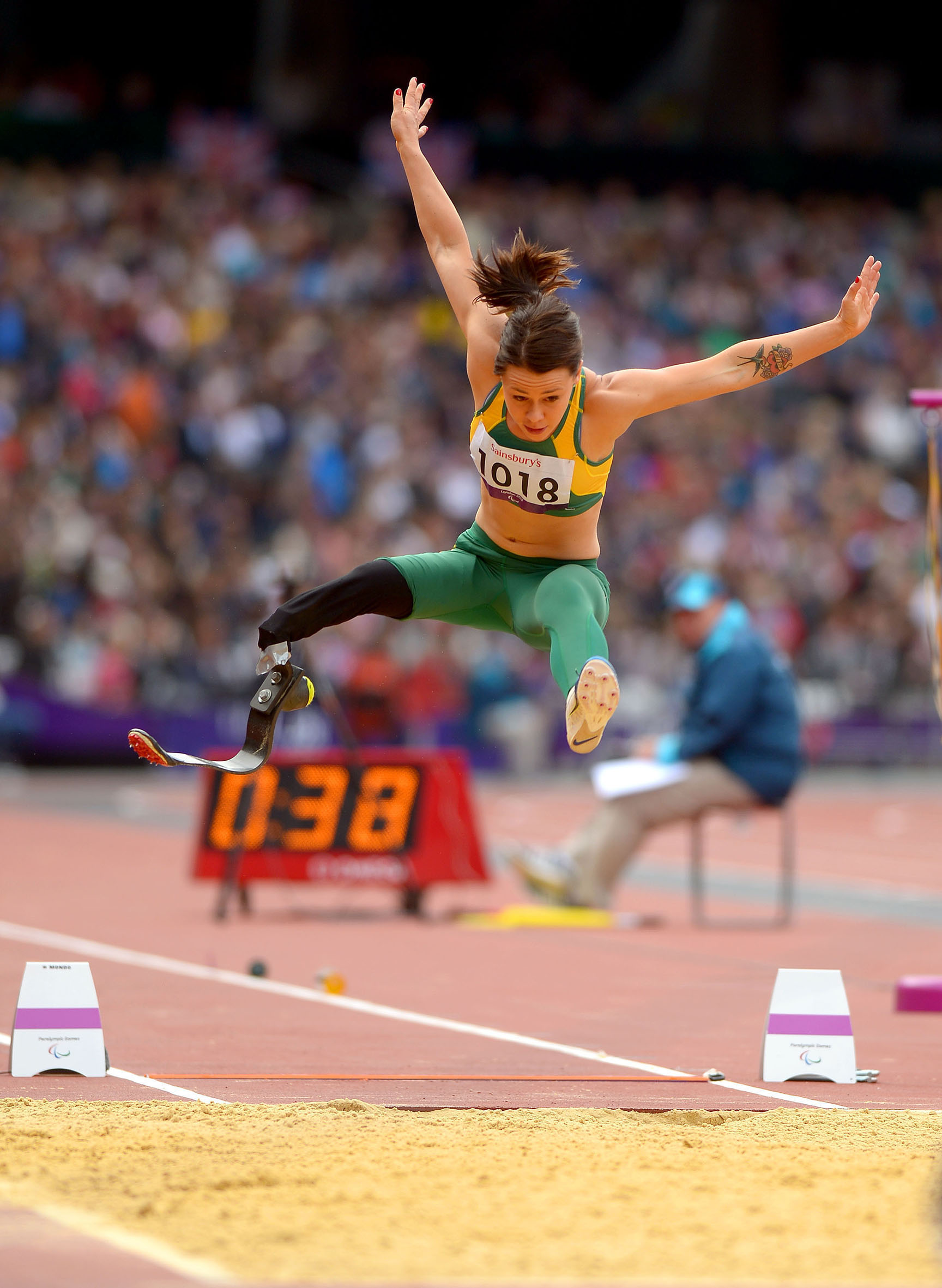
Cartwright at the London Paralympics

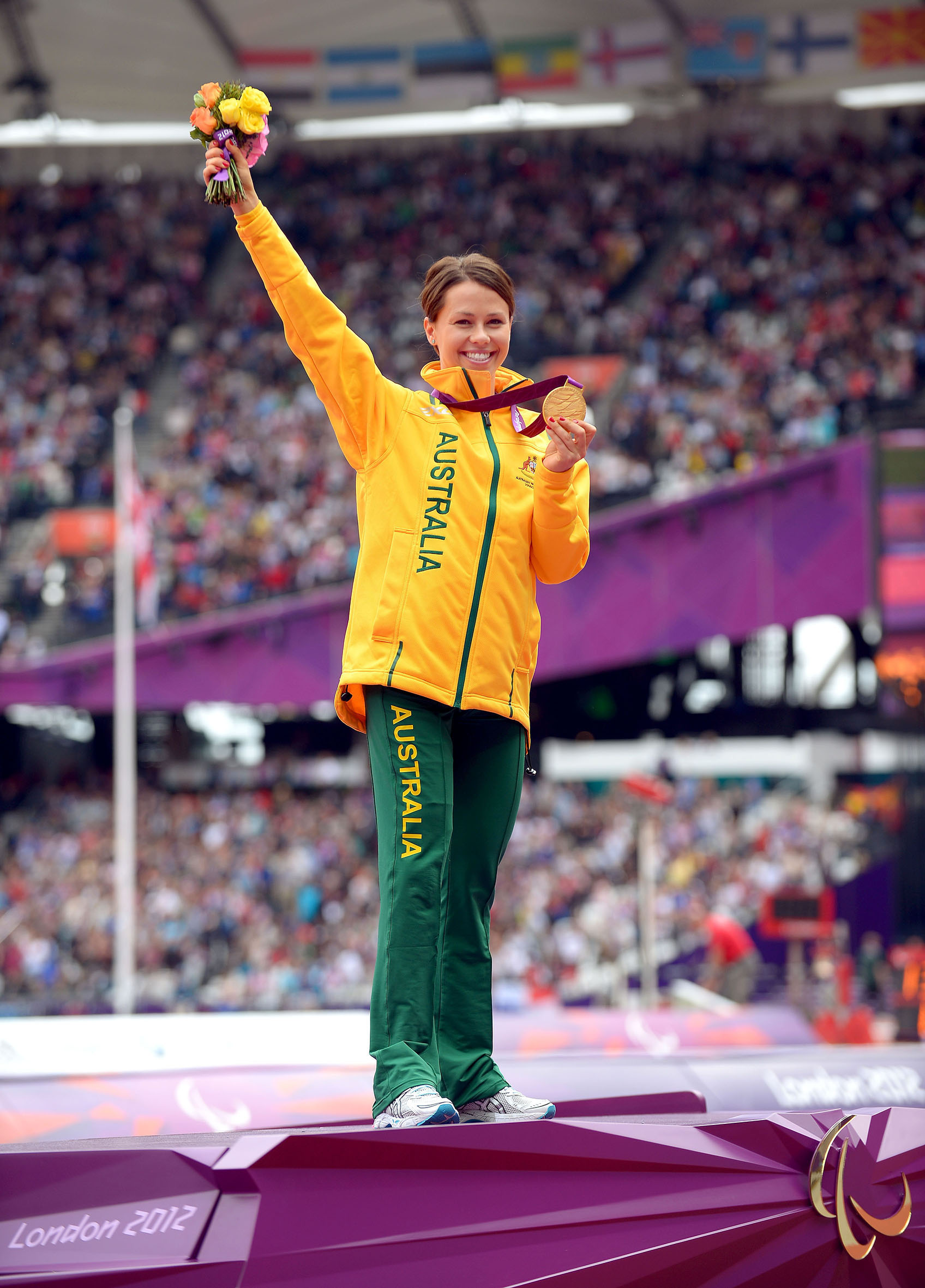
Cartwright at the London Paralympics

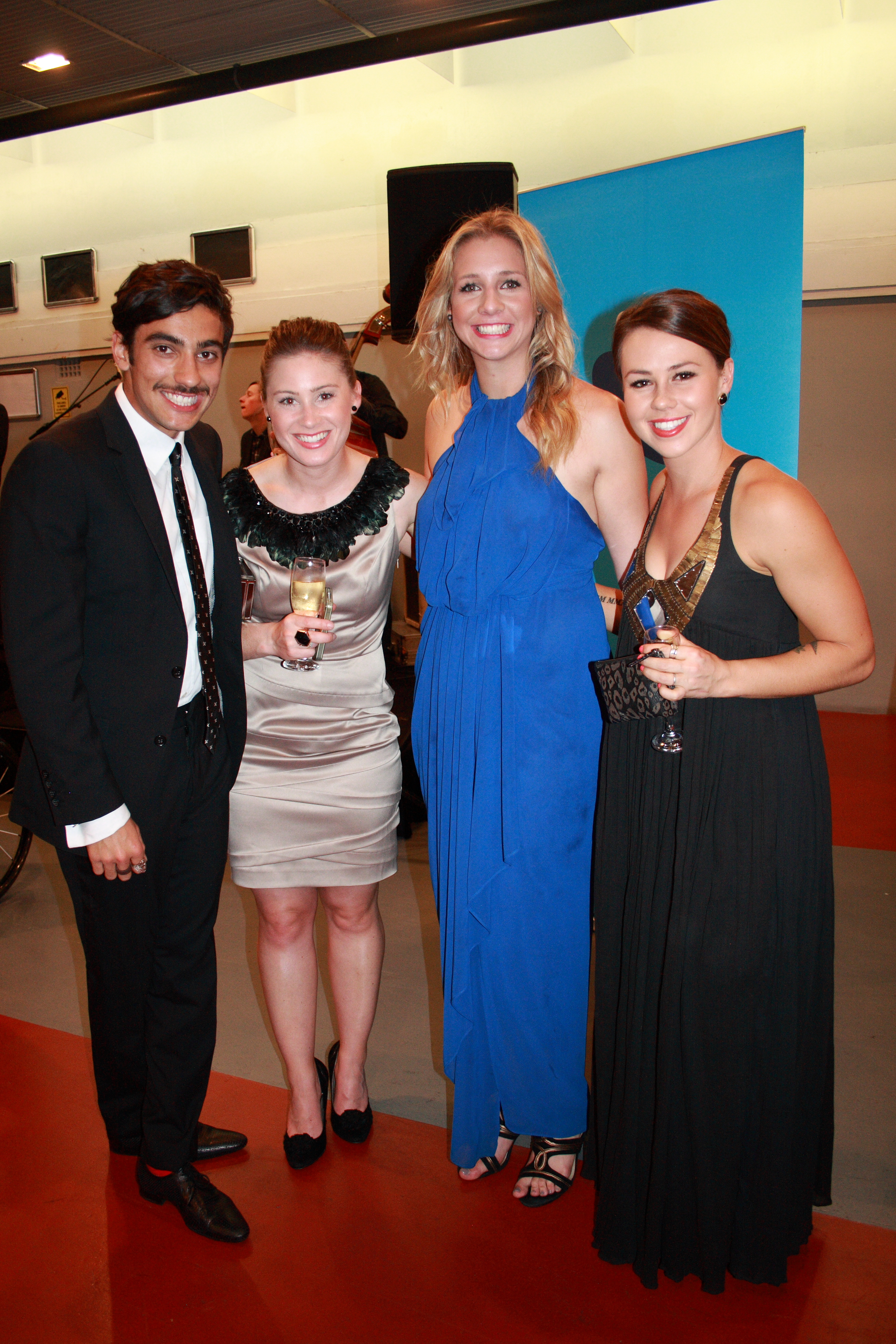
Cartwright with athletics teammates at the 2012 Australian Paralympian of the Year ceremony
