= Wrestling at the 2018 Commonwealth Games – Women's freestyle 68 kg =

Wrestling – Women's freestyle 68 kg at the 2018 Commonwealth Games
- Venue: Carrara Sports and Leisure Centre
- Dates: 13 April 2018
- Competitors: 6 from 6 nations

Medalists
gold medal	Blessing Oborududu	Nigeria
silver medal	Danielle Lappage	Canada
bronze medal	Divya Kakran	India

The women's freestyle 68 kg freestyle wrestling competition at the 2018 Commonwealth Games in Gold Coast, Australia was held on 13 April at the Carrara Sports and Leisure Centre.

== Results ==
As there were less than 6 competitors entered in this event, the competition was contested as a Nordic round with each athlete playing every other athlete. The medallists were determined by the standings after the completion of the Nordic round.

Legend

- F — Won by fall

=== Elimination groups ===
==== Group A ====
Pos	Athlete	Pld	W	L	CP	TP
1	Blessing Oborududu (NGR)	2	2	0	10	8
2	Sherin Sultana (BAN)	2	1	1	5	8
3	Lilian Nthiga (KEN)	2	0	2	0	3

Source: UWW

	Score		CP
Lilian Nthiga (KEN)	3–8 Fall	Sherin Sultana (BAN)	0–5 VFA
Lilian Nthiga (KEN)	0–2 Fall	Blessing Oborududu (NGR)	0–5 VFA
Sherin Sultana (BAN)	0–6 Fall	Blessing Oborududu (NGR)	0–5 VFA

==== Group B ====
Pos	Athlete	Pld	W	L	CP	TP
1	Danielle Lappage (CAN)	2	2	0	8	22
2	Divya Kakran (IND)	2	1	1	6	12
3	Gaelle Alakame (CMR)	2	0	2	0	8

Source: UWW

	Score		CP
Gaelle Alakame (CMR)	0–10	Danielle Lappage (CAN)	0–4 VSU
Gaelle Alakame (CMR)	8–10 Fall	Divya Kakran (IND)	0–5 VFA
Divya Kakran (IND)	2–12	Danielle Lappage (CAN)	1–4 VSU1

=== Knockout round ===
Semifinals
Blessing Oborududu (NGR)	11
Divya Kakran (IND)	1
Danielle Lappage (CAN)	10
Sherin Sultana (BAN)	0

Finals
Blessing Oborududu (NGR)	4
Danielle Lappage (CAN)	3
Bronze medal match
Divya Kakran (IND)	4^{F}
Sherin Sultana (BAN)	0
