= Wrestling at the 2018 Commonwealth Games – Women's freestyle 76 kg =

Wrestling – Women's freestyle 76 kg at the 2018 Commonwealth Games
- Venue: Carrara Sports and Leisure Centre
- Dates: 12 April 2018
- Competitors: 8 from 8 nations

Medalists
gold medal	Erica Wiebe	Canada
silver medal	Blessing Onyebuchi	Nigeria
bronze medal	Georgina Nelthorpe	England
bronze medal	Kiran Bishnoi	India

The women's freestyle 76 kg freestyle wrestling competition at the 2018 Commonwealth Games in Gold Coast, Australia was held on 12 April at the Carrara Sports and Leisure Centre.

This freestyle wrestling competition consists of a single-elimination tournament, with a repechage used to determine the winner of two bronze medals. The two finalists face off for gold and silver medals. Each wrestler who loses to one of the two finalists moves into the repechage, culminating in a pair of bronze medal matches featuring the semifinal losers each facing the remaining repechage opponent from their half of the bracket.

== Results ==
- F — Won by fall

=== Main Bracket ===
Quarterfinals		Semifinals		Finals
Erica Wiebe (CAN)	4^{F}
Hajaratu Kamara (SLE)	0	Erica Wiebe (CAN)	11
Georgina Nelthorpe (ENG)	8	Georgina Nelthorpe (ENG)	0
Naomi de Bruine (AUS)	4			Erica Wiebe (CAN)	4^{F}
Danielle Sino (CMR)	1			Blessing Onyebuchi (NGR)	2
Kiran Bishnoi (IND)	11	Kiran Bishnoi (IND)	0
Katouskia Pariadhaven (MRI)	0	Blessing Onyebuchi (NGR)	10
Blessing Onyebuchi (NGR)	10

=== Repechage ===
Bronze medal match
Hajaratu Kamara (SLE)	0
Georgina Nelthorpe (ENG)	10^{F}
Katouskia Pariadhaven (MRI)	0
Kiran Bishnoi (IND)	10^{F}
