= Boxing at the 2018 Commonwealth Games – Women's welterweight =

Boxing competitions

Boxing – Women's welterweight at the 2018 Commonwealth Games
- Venue: Oxenford Studios
- Dates: 6 – 14 April 2018
- Competitors: 9 from 9 nations

Medalists
gold medal	Sandy Ryan	England
silver medal	Rosie Eccles	Wales
bronze medal	Kaye Scott	Australia
bronze medal	Marie-Jeanne Parent	Canada

The women's welterweight boxing competitions at the 2018 Commonwealth Games in Gold Coast, Australia took place between 6 and 14 April at Oxenford Studios. Women welterweights were limited to those boxers weighing less than 69 kilograms. This event made its Commonwealth Games debut.

Like all Commonwealth boxing events, the competition was a straight single-elimination tournament. Both semifinal losers were awarded bronze medals, so no boxers competed again after their first loss. Bouts consisted of three rounds of three minutes each, with one-minute breaks between rounds. Beginning this year, the competition was scored using the "must-ten" scoring system.

== Schedule ==
The schedule is as follows:

All times are Australian Eastern Standard Time (UTC+10)

Date	Time	Round
Friday 6 April 2018	14:02	Round of 16
Sunday 8 April 2018	14:32/21:02	Quarter-finals
Wednesday 11 April 2018	21:17	Semi-finals
Saturday 14 April 2018	20:02	Final

== Results ==
The draw is as follows:

Round of 16
Aubiege Azangue (CMR)	1
Rosie Eccles (WAL)	4

Quarterfinals
Magan Maka (TGA)	0
Rosie Eccles (WAL)	5
Kaye Scott (AUS)	5
Ituni Oriola (NGR)	0
Sandy Ryan (ENG)	3
Lovlina Borgohain (IND)	2
Marie-Jeanne Parent (CAN)	5
Lorna Simbi (KEN)	0

Semifinals
Rosie Eccles (WAL)	4
Kaye Scott (AUS)	1
Sandy Ryan (ENG)	4
Marie-Jeanne Parent (CAN)	1

Final
Rosie Eccles (WAL)	2
Sandy Ryan (ENG)	3
