= Blessing Oborududu =

Nigerian Olympic wrestler

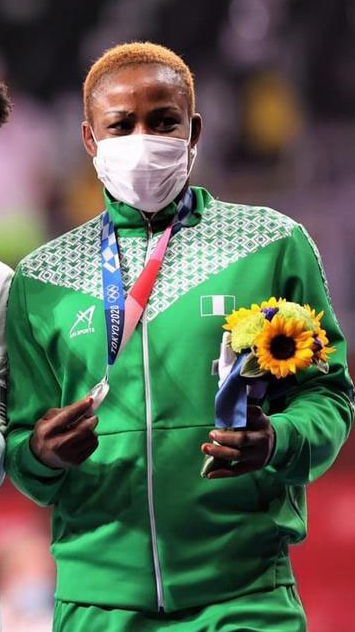
- Oborududu at the 2020 Summer Olympics

Personal information
- Born: 12 March 1989 (age 37)

Sport
- Country: Nigeria
- Sport: Amateur wrestling
- Event: Freestyle
Medal record
Women's freestyle wrestling
Representing Nigeria
Olympic Games
Silver medal – second place	2020 Tokyo	68 kg
African Championships
Gold medal – first place	2010 Cairo	59 kg
Gold medal – first place	2011 Dakar	63 kg
Gold medal – first place	2013 N'Djamena	63 kg
Gold medal – first place	2014 Tunis	63 kg
Gold medal – first place	2015 Alexandria	63 kg
Gold medal – first place	2016 Alexandria	69 kg
Gold medal – first place	2017 Marrakesh	63 kg
Gold medal – first place	2018 Port Harcourt	68 kg
Gold medal – first place	2019 Hammamet	68 kg
Gold medal – first place	2020 Algiers	68 kg
Gold medal – first place	2022 El Jadida	68 kg
Gold medal – first place	2023 Hammamet	68 kg
Gold medal – first place	2024 Alexandria	68 kg
Bronze medal – third place	2009 Casablanca	59 kg
African Games
Gold medal – first place	2015 Brazzaville	63 kg
Gold medal – first place	2019 Rabat	68 kg
Gold medal – first place	2023 Accra	68 kg
Commonwealth Games
Gold medal – first place	2018 Gold Coast	68 kg
Gold medal – first place	2022 Birmingham	68 kg
Silver medal – second place	2010 Delhi	63 kg
Bronze medal – third place	2014 Glasgow	63 kg
Islamic Solidarity Games
Gold medal – first place	2017 Baku	63 kg
Yasar Dogu Tournament
Gold medal – first place	2022 Istanbul	68 kg
Bronze medal – third place	2019 Istanbul	68 kg
2021 Poland Open
Silver medal – second place	2021 Poland	68 kg

Blessing Oborududu (born 12 March 1989, in Gbanranu) is a Nigerian freestyle wrestler. She is currently ranked as the world number two woman wrestler and also the first wrestler to win an Olympic medal representing Nigeria at the Olympics. She is also a twelve-time African champion from 2010 to 2023.

== Career ==
Oborududu was invited to a national camp in 2007 to take part at the African Games after noticing her impressive performances at school inter-house wrestling competitions. Her parents were initially against her ambition to become a sport wrestler and advised her that wrestling is allocated only for boys. She idolised Canadian-Nigerian wrestler Daniel Igali who was originally regarded as the first person from Nigeria to win an Olympic medal in wrestling.

She has won a gold medal at the African Wrestling Championships every year for the last 11 years, except for 2012 when she did not enter due to competing in the 2012 Summer Olympics. She competed in the freestyle 63 kg event at the 2012 Summer Olympics and was eliminated in the 1/8 finals by Monika Michalik.

She won the bronze medal in the women's middleweight at the 2014 Commonwealth Games after defeating Chloe Spiteri in her bronze medal match. She also competed in the women's middleweight at the 2016 Summer Olympics, losing to Soronzonboldyn Battsetseg in the second round. She won a gold medal for women 63 kg category at the 2017 Islamic Solidarity Games. She won a gold medal at the Gold Coast 2018 Commonwealth Games in the 68 kg women's freestyle wrestling event, defeating Canada's Danielle Lappage.

She qualified at the 2021 African & Oceania Wrestling Olympic Qualification Tournament to represent Nigeria at the 2020 Summer Olympics in Tokyo, Japan. In June 2021, she won the silver medal in her event at the 2021 Poland Open held in Warsaw, Poland.

On 3 August 2021, she won the silver medal in the women's freestyle 68 kg after losing to America's Tamyra Mensah-Stock 4–1 at the 2020 Summer Olympics. She also became the first Nigerian to win an Olympic medal in wrestling. She also eventually won the Nigeria's first silver medal at the Tokyo Olympics.

In 2022, she won the gold medal in the 68 kg event at the Yasar Dogu Tournament held in Istanbul, Turkey. by beating her counterpart Meerim Zhumanazarova from Kyrgyzstan 3–2. She won the gold medal in her event at the 2022 African Wrestling Championships held in El Jadida, Morocco. A month later, she won one of the bronze medals in her event at the Matteo Pellicone Ranking Series 2022 held in Rome, Italy. She won the gold medal in the women's 68 kg event at the 2022 Commonwealth Games held in Birmingham, England.
