= Powerlifting at the 2014 Commonwealth Games – Women's 61 kg =

Powerlifting – Women's 61 kg at the 2014 Commonwealth Games
- Venue: Clyde Auditorium
- Dates: 2 August 2014
- Competitors: 6 from 6 nations
- Winning total weight: 136kg

Medalists
gold medal	Esther Oyema	Nigeria
silver medal	Natalie Blake	England
bronze medal	Sakina Khatun	India

The Women's 61 kg para-sport powerlifting event at the 2014 Commonwealth Games in Glasgow, Scotland, took place at Scottish Exhibition and Conference Centre on 2 August. The weightlifter from Nigeria won the gold.

== Result ==
Rank	Athlete	#1	#2	#3	Result	Notes
1st place, gold medalist(s)	Esther Oyema (NGR)	120	125	126	136	
2nd place, silver medalist(s)	Natalie Blake (ENG)	87	91	95	100.2	
3rd place, bronze medalist(s)	Sakina Khatun (IND)	70	75	~~77~~	88.2	
4	Juanita Stierman (RSA)	84	~~88~~	~~90~~	82.4	
5	Mimozette Nghamsi Fotie (CMR)	65	~~72~~	~~72~~	74.4	
	Flomena Jepkoech (KEN)	-	-	-	DNS	
