= Wrestling at the 2014 Commonwealth Games – Women's freestyle 63 kg =

Wrestling – Women's freestyle 63 kg at the 2014 Commonwealth Games
- Venue: Scottish Exhibition and Conference Centre
- Dates: 31 July 2014
- Competitors: 9 from 9 nations

Medalists
gold medal	Danielle Lappage	Canada
silver medal	Geetika Jakhar	India
bronze medal	Blessing Oborududu	Nigeria
bronze medal	Blandine Metala Epanga	Cameroon

The women's 63 kg freestyle wrestling competitions at the 2014 Commonwealth Games in Glasgow, Scotland was held on 31 July at the Scottish Exhibition and Conference Centre.

This freestyle wrestling competition consists of a single-elimination tournament, with a repechage used to determine the winner of two bronze medals. The two finalists face off for gold and silver medals. Each wrestler who loses to one of the two finalists moves into the repechage, culminating in a pair of bronze medal matches featuring the semifinal losers each facing the remaining repechage opponent from their half of the bracket.

== Results ==
Results:

Legend

- F — Won by fall

=== Main bracket ===
Round of 16
Blandine Metala Epanga (CMR)	12
Zumicke Geringer (RSA)	2

Quarterfinals
Chloe Spiteri (ENG)	10
Leah Ndungu (KEN)	0
Blessing Oborududu (NGR)	3
Danielle Lappage (CAN)	6
Stevie Kelly (AUS)	0
Sarah Connolly (WAL)	10
Geetika Jakhar (IND)	8
Blandine Metala Epanga (CMR)	2

Semifinals
Chloe Spiteri (ENG)	0
Danielle Lappage (CAN)	11
Sarah Connolly (WAL)	2
Geetika Jakhar (IND)	13

Final
Danielle Lappage (CAN)	7
Geetika Jakhar (IND)	0

=== Repechage ===
Bronze medal match
Blessing Oborududu (NGR)	11
Chloe Spiteri (ENG)	2
Blandine Metala Epanga (CMR)	11
Sarah Connolly (WAL)	0
