= Georgina Nelthorpe =

British freestyle wrestler

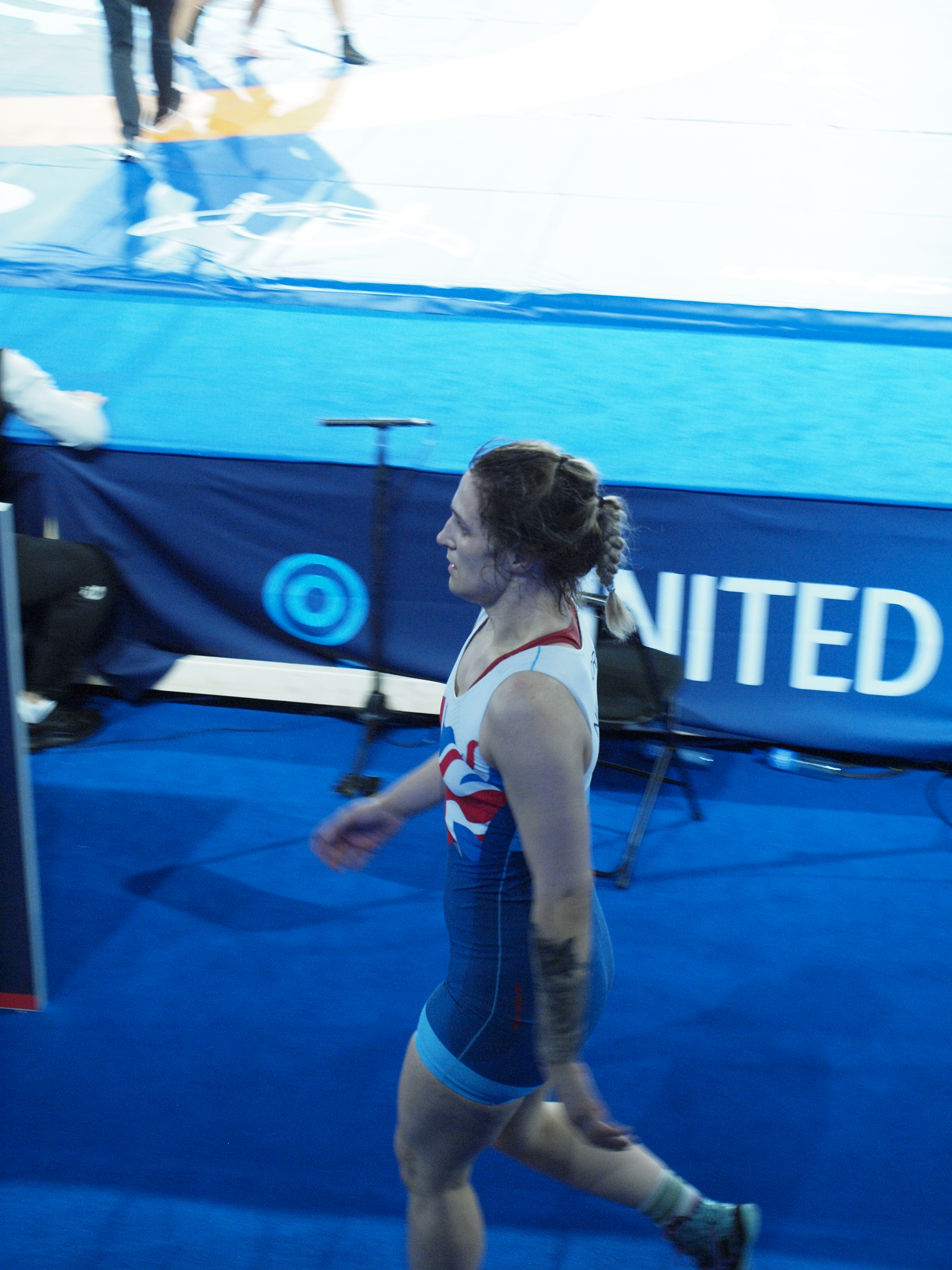
- Nelthorpe at the 2021 World Wrestling Championships in Oslo, Norway

Personal information
- Full name: Georgina Olwen Nelthorpe
- Born: 20 January 1997 (age 29) Guildford, England

Sport
- Country: Great Britain
- Sport: Amateur wrestling
- Weight class: 76 kg
- Event: Freestyle
Medal record
Women's freestyle wrestling
Representing England
Commonwealth Games
Bronze medal – third place	2018 Gold Coast	76 kg
Bronze medal – third place	2022 Birmingham	76 kg

Georgina Olwen Nelthorpe (born 20 January 1997) is a British freestyle wrestler. She is a two-time bronze medalist at the Commonwealth Games. She won one of the bronze medals in the women's 76 kg event at the 2018 Commonwealth Games and the 2022 Commonwealth Games.

== Career ==
Nelthorpe won one of the bronze medals in the women's freestyle 76 kg event at the 2018 Commonwealth Games held in Gold Coast, Australia.

In 2019, Nelthorpe competed in the women's freestyle 76 kg event at the European Games held in Minsk, Belarus. She was eliminated in her second match by Sabira Aliyeva of Azerbaijan.

In March 2021, Nelthorpe competed at the European Qualification Tournament in Budapest, Hungary hoping to qualify for the 2020 Summer Olympics in Tokyo, Japan. She was eliminated in her second match by Mariya Oryashkova of Bulgaria. In May 2021, she failed to qualify for the Olympics at the World Olympic Qualification Tournament held in Sofia, Bulgaria. She was eliminated in her second match by María Acosta of Venezuela. In October 2021, she competed in the women's 76 kg event at the World Wrestling Championships held in Oslo, Norway where she was eliminated in her first match by Marina Surovtseva of Russia.

Nelthorpe won one of the bronze medals in the women's 76 kg event at the 2022 Commonwealth Games held in Birmingham, England.

== Achievements ==
Year	Tournament	Location	Result	Event
2018	Commonwealth Games	Gold Coast, Australia	3rd	Freestyle 76 kg
2022	Commonwealth Games	Birmingham, England	3rd	Freestyle 76 kg
