= Wrestling at the 2014 Commonwealth Games – Women's freestyle 75 kg =

Wrestling – Women's freestyle 75 kg at the 2014 Commonwealth Games
- Venue: Scottish Exhibition and Conference Centre
- Dates: 29 July 2014
- Competitors: 5 from 5 nations

Medalists
gold medal	Erica Wiebe	Canada
silver medal	Annabelle Ali	Cameroon
bronze medal	Blessing Onyebuchi	Nigeria

The women's 75 kg freestyle wrestling competition at the 2014 Commonwealth Games in Glasgow, Scotland was held on 29 July at the Scottish Exhibition and Conference Centre.

== Results ==
As there were less than 6 competitors entered in this event, the competition was contested as a Nordic round with each athlete playing every other athlete. The medallists were determined by the standings after the completion of the Nordic round.

Legend

- F — Won by fall

=== Nordic group ===
Pos	Athlete	Pld	W	L	CP	TP
1	Erica Wiebe (CAN)	4	4	0	15	35
2	Annabelle Ali (CMR)	4	3	1	12	28
3	Blessing Onyebuchi (NGR)	4	2	2	10	21
4	Jyoti (IND)	4	1	3	4	13
5	Sophie Edwards (ENG)	4	0	4	1	2

Source: UWW

	Score		CP
Sophie Edwards (ENG)	0–10	Erica Wiebe (CAN)	0–4 ST
Blessing Onyebuchi (NGR)	8–0 Fall	Jyoti (IND)	4–0 VT
Annabelle Ali (CMR)	10–0 Fall	Sophie Edwards (ENG)	4–0 VT
Erica Wiebe (CAN)	12–2	Blessing Onyebuchi (NGR)	4–1 SP
Jyoti (IND)	13–2	Sophie Edwards (ENG)	4–1 SP
Annabelle Ali (CMR)	2–4	Erica Wiebe (CAN)	1–3 PP
Blessing Onyebuchi (NGR)	10–0	Sophie Edwards (ENG)	4–0 ST
Jyoti (IND)	0–6 Fall	Annabelle Ali (CMR)	0–4 VT
Erica Wiebe (CAN)	9–0 Fall	Sophie Edwards (ENG)	4–0 VT
Blessing Onyebuchi (NGR)	1–10	Annabelle Ali (CMR)	1–3 PP
