= Cameroon at the 2019 African Games =

- Flag of Cameroon
- IOC code: CMR
- NOC: Cameroon Olympic and Sports Committee

in Rabat, Morocco 19 August 2019 – 31 August 2019
- Competitors: 126 (52 men and 74 women) in 13 sports
- Medals Ranked 11th: Gold 10 Silver 12 Bronze 9 Total 31

African Games appearances
- 1965; 1973; 1978; 1987; 1991; 1995; 1999; 2003; 2007; 2011; 2015; 2019; 2023

Cameroon competed at the 2019 African Games held from 19 to 31 August 2019 in Rabat, Morocco. In total, athletes representing Cameroon won 5 gold medals, 14 silver medals and 9 bronze medals and the country finished 11th in the medal table.

== Medal summary ==
=== Medal table ===
Medal	Name	Sport	Event	Date
Gold	Hélène Wezeu Dombeu	Judo	Women's -63 kg	17 August
Gold	Etienne Martial Nonani Bayomog	Karate	Kumite -75kg	26 August
Gold	Joseph Essombe	Wrestling	Women's freestyle 53 kg	29 August
Gold	Clementine Meukeugni	Weightlifting	Women's 87 kg Clean & Jerk	30 August
Gold	Men's team	Volleyball	Men's tournament	31 August
Silver	Hortence Vanessa Mballa Atangana	Judo	Women's +78 kg	18 August
Silver	Women's under-20 football team	Football	Women's tournament	29 August
Silver	Women's handball team	Handball	Women's tournament	29 August
Silver	Hannfou Nana Sarah	Table tennis	Women's singles	29 August
Silver	Berthe Etane Ngolle	Wrestling	Women's freestyle 62 kg	29 August
Silver	Jeanne Gaëlle Eyenga	Weightlifting	Women's 76 kg Snatch	29 August
Silver	Jeanne Gaëlle Eyenga	Weightlifting	Women's 76 kg Clean & Jerk	29 August
Silver	Jeanne Gaëlle Eyenga	Weightlifting	Women's 76 kg	29 August
Silver	Women's team	Volleyball	Women's tournament	30 August
Silver	Joël Essama	Weightlifting	Men's 102 kg Snatch	30 August
Silver	Joël Essama	Weightlifting	Men's 102 kg Clean & Jerk	30 August
Silver	Joël Essama	Weightlifting	Men's 102 kg	30 August
Silver	Clementine Meukeugni	Weightlifting	Women's 87 kg Snatch	30 August
Silver	Clementine Meukeugni	Weightlifting	Women's 87 kg	30 August
Bronze	Dieudonne Dolassem	Judo	Men's -90 kg	18 August
Bronze	Ayuk Otay Arrey Sophina	Judo	Women's -70 kg	18 August
Bronze	Jean Marc Kollo Ndzomo	Karate	Men's Kumite -67kg	26 August
Bronze	Ogandoa Nsioma Stella	Karate	Women's Kumite +68kg	26 August
Bronze	Angana Mendo Blandine Ghislaine	Karate	Women's Kumite -68kg	26 August
Bronze	Akele Akele	Karate	Women's Kata individual	26 August
Bronze	Dorine Stéphane Mambou	Boxing	Women's 57 kg	28 August
Bronze	Blandine Ngiri	Wrestling	Women's freestyle 68 kg	29 August
Bronze	Cedric Abossolo	Wrestling	Men's freestyle 86 kg	30 August

Medals by sport
Sport	1st place, gold medalist(s)	2nd place, silver medalist(s)	3rd place, bronze medalist(s)	Total
Boxing	0	0	1	1
Football	0	1	0	1
Handball	0	1	0	1
Judo	1	1	2	4
Karate	1	0	4	5
Table tennis	0	1	0	1
Volleyball	1	1	0	2
Weightlifting	6	6	0	12
Wrestling	1	1	2	4
Total	10	12	9	31

Medals by date
Day	Date	1st place, gold medalist(s)	2nd place, silver medalist(s)	3rd place, bronze medalist(s)	Total
1	16 August	0	0	0	0
2	17 August	1	0	0	1
3	18 August	0	1	2	3

== Athletics ==
No medals were won by athletes representing Cameroon in athletics.

Jean Tarcisius Batamboc and Mayoumendam Zounedou competed in the men's 100 metres event.

Fanny Appes Ekanga competed in the women's 200 metres event.

== Boxing ==
Seven athletes were scheduled to compete in boxing. Dorine Stéphane Mambou won the bronze medal in the women's featherweight (57kg) event.

== Chess ==
Four chess players represented Cameroon in chess.

== Football ==
Cameroon's women's national under-20 football team won the silver medal in the women's tournament.

== Gymnastics ==
In total, four athletes represented Cameroon in gymnastics.

== Handball ==
The women's national handball team competed in handball at the 2019 African Games. They won the silver medal in the women's tournament.

== Judo ==
Eight athletes represented Cameroon in judo: Njepang Njapa Audrey Dilane, Ayuk Otay Arrey Sophina, Tsala Tsala Bernadin, Dieudonne Dolassem, Bell Ngindjel Franck Parisi, Hélène Wezeu Dombeu, Hortence Atangana and Bata Philomene Jocelin.

== Karate ==
Cameroon competed in karate.

== Table tennis ==
Cameroon competed in table tennis.

Nyoh Ofon Derek and Sarah Hanffou competed in table tennis.

Derek competed in the men's singles event and Sarah competed in the women's singles event. Sarah won the silver medal in that event.

They both also competed in the mixed doubles event.

== Taekwondo ==
Adjewa Frederic, Amougou Antoine Thiery, Neyi Esrom and Touembou Kamgue Silvere competed in Taekwondo.

== Volleyball ==
Both's the men's and women's national volleyball teams competed in volleyball.

The men's team won gold in the men's tournament and the women's team won silver in the women's tournament.

== Weightlifting ==
Cameroon competed in weightlifting. In total, athletes representing Cameroon in weightlifting won one gold medal and eight silver medals.

== Wrestling ==
Six wrestlers represented Cameroon. In total they won one gold medal, one silver medal and two bronze medals.
