= Lucy Ejike =

Nigerian Paralympic powerlifter

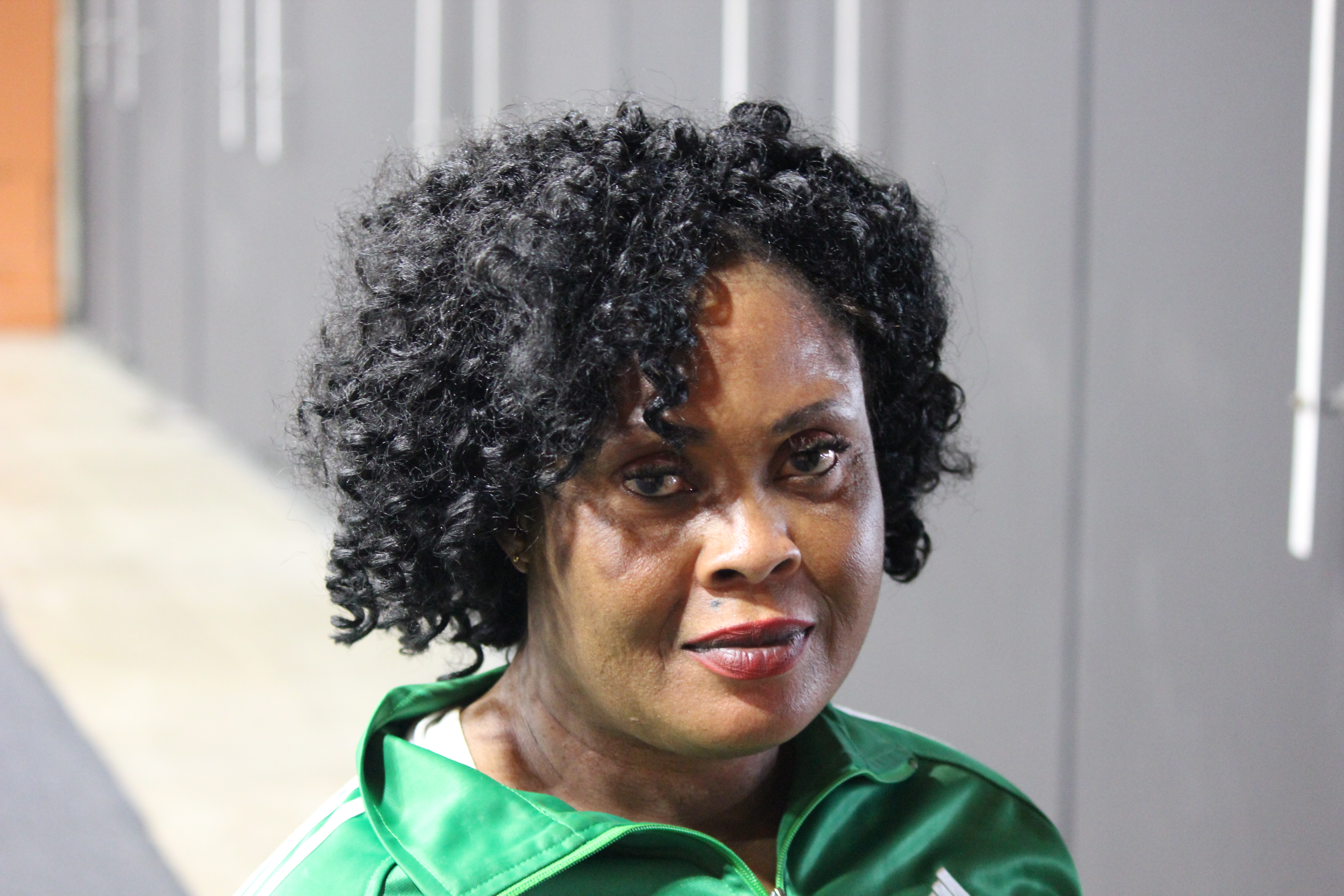
- Ejike in 2016

Personal information
- Full name: Lucy Ogechukwu Ejike
- Nationality: Nigerian
- Born: 16 October 1977 (age 48) Enugu, Nigeria

Achievements and titles
- Paralympic finals: 2000 Sydney; 2004 Athens; 2008 Beijing; 2012 London; 2016 Rio
Medal record
Women's para powerlifting
Representing Nigeria
Paralympic Games
Gold medal – first place	2004 Athens	44 kg
Gold medal – first place	2008 Beijing	48 kg
Gold medal – first place	2016 Rio de Janeiro	61 kg
Silver medal – second place	2000 Sydney	44 kg
Silver medal – second place	2012 London	56 kg
Bronze medal – third place	2020 Tokyo	61 kg
World Championships
Gold medal – first place	2017 Mexico City	61 kg
Gold medal – first place	2019 Nur-Sultan	61 kg
Gold medal – first place	2021 Tbilisi	67 kg
Commonwealth Games
Silver medal – second place	2018 Gold Coast	Lightweight

Lucy Ogechukwu Ejike // (born 16 October 1977) is a Nigerian Paralympic powerlifter. She has represented her country at six consecutive Paralympic Games from 2000 in Sydney through to 2021 in Tokyo. She has won medals at each, three gold, two silver and one bronze. She won a further silver medal at the Gold Coast 2018 Commonwealth games women's lightweight category of the Para Powerlifting event behind compatriot Esther Oyema.

== Personal history ==
Ejike was born in Enugu, Nigeria, in 1977. Ejike uses a wheelchair due to polio Ejike is married and she has two sons. She lives in the state of Enugu where she works as a sports administrator.

== Powerlifting career ==
Ejike began training as a powerlifter shortly before the 2000 Summer Paralympics in Sydney, Australia. At the Sydney Games she competed in the 44 kg weight class taking the silver medal with a lift of 102.5 kg, behind Fatma Omar of Egypt. Four years later at the Athens Games, while competing at the same weight class, she broke the Paralympic powerlifting world record twice on the way to winning the gold medal with a lift of 127.5 kg.

At the 2008 Beijing Games, Ejike moved up one weight class and took gold in the 48 kg event. She broke the world record with her first attempt, lifting 125 kg. She broke the record again with a second lift of 130 kg, but faltered while trying to lift 137.5 kg on her third attempt.

After her win in Beijing, Ejike stated that has intentions of moving up another weight to set a new world record in a third class. This led to a showdown at the 2012 Summer Paralympics in London with her rival from Athens, and current 56 kg world record holder, Fatma Omar. Ejike took the lead in the first round with a lift of 135 kg but she was unable to better this attempt, while Omar bettered her record from Beijing with a final lift of 142 kg. Despite failing to beat Omar, the two women were a class above the rest of the field, and Ejike took silver, 17 kg over bronze medalist Özlem Becerikli of Turkey.

Four years later Ejike and Omar met for the third time at a Paralympic Games, when thy both entered the 2016 Games in Rio. After London the International Paralympic Committee changed the powerlifting weight categories for both men and women, and the two competed in the women's 61 kg division. The year previous Mexico's Amalia Perez had set a world record in the 61 kg with a lift of 133 kg, which Ejike surpassed with her first lift of 135 kg. Omar had failed at 133 kg on her first lift, but was successful at the same weight on her second attempt. Ejike improved her lead with her second lift, setting her second world record of the day with a weight of 138 kg. Omar responded with a final lift of 140 kg, putting Ejike into silver medal place. With her final attempt Ejike succeeded with her third world record of the day, and the gold medal when she completed a lift of 142 kg to make her a three time gold medal winner. As well as her gold medal success, Ejike was also honoured at Rio by being selected by her country to be the flag bearer at the opening ceremony.

She competed at the 2018 Commonwealth Games where she won a silver medal in the lightweight event.

During the COVID-19 pandemic she had to stay at home and she reported that this affected her ability to train. She did take another gold at the World Championships in 2021 in Manchester where the athletes were not allowed to eat at a restaurant together because of the pandemic restrictions. Ejike was chosen as part of Nigeria's team for the 2020 Summer Paralympics in Tokyo where she planned to gain more gold medals and to break her own world record. She won the bronze medal in the women's 61 kg event at the 2020 Summer Paralympics held in Tokyo, Japan. A few months later, she won the gold medal in her event at the 2021 World Para Powerlifting Championships held in Tbilisi, Georgia.
