= Wrestling at the 2022 Commonwealth Games – Women's freestyle 68 kg =

Wrestling competition

Wrestling – Women's freestyle 68 kg at the 2022 Commonwealth Games
- Venue: Coventry Arena
- Dates: 5 August 2022
- Competitors: 9 from 9 nations

Medalists
gold medal	Blessing Oborududu	Nigeria
silver medal	Linda Morais	Canada
bronze medal	Divya Kakran	India
bronze medal	Tayla Ford	New Zealand

The Women's freestyle 68 kg wrestling competitions at the 2022 Commonwealth Games in Birmingham, England took place on 5 August at the Coventry Arena. A total of nine competitors from nine nations took part.

This freestyle wrestling competition consists of a single-elimination tournament, with a repechage used to determine the winner of two bronze medals. The two finalists face off for gold and silver medals. Each wrestler who loses to one of the two finalists moves into the repechage, culminating in a pair of bronze medal matches featuring the semifinal losers each facing the remaining repechage opponent from their half of the bracket.

== Results ==
The draw is as follows:

Legend

- F — Won by fall

=== Main bracket ===
Round of 16
Blandine Ngiri (CMR)	0
Blessing Oborududu (NGR)	10

Quarterfinals
Divya Kakran (IND)	0
Blessing Oborududu (NGR)	11
Tithy Roy (BAN)	0
Tiger Lemalie (TGA)	10
Linda Morais (CAN)	6^{F}
Amylee Aza (MRI)	0
Sarah Clossick (ENG)	0
Tayla Ford (NZL)	10

Semifinals
Blessing Oborududu (NGR)	10
Tiger Lemalie (TGA)	0
Linda Morais (CAN)	6
Tayla Ford (NZL)	4

Final
Blessing Oborududu (NGR)	5
Linda Morais (CAN)	1

=== Repechage ===
Repechage round
Blandine Ngiri (CMR)	0
Divya Kakran (IND)	4^{F}

Bronze medal match
Divya Kakran (IND)	2^{F}
Tiger Lemalie (TGA)	0
Amylee Aza (MRI)	0
Tayla Ford (NZL)	4^{F}
