= Powerlifting at the 2014 Commonwealth Games – Men's 72 kg =

Powerlifting – Men's 72 kg at the 2014 Commonwealth Games
- Venue: Clyde Auditorium
- Dates: 2 August 2014
- Competitors: 14 from 10 nations
- Winning total weight: 221kg

Medalists
gold medal	Paul Kehinde	Nigeria
silver medal	Rolland Ezuruike	Nigeria
bronze medal	Ali Jawad	England

The Men's 72 kg para-sport powerlifting event at the 2014 Commonwealth Games in Glasgow, Scotland, took place at Scottish Exhibition and Conference Centre on 2 August. The weightlifter from Nigeria won the gold.

== Result ==
Rank	Athlete	#1	#2	#3	Result	Notes
1st place, gold medalist(s)	Paul Kehinde (NGR)	192	202	207	221	
2nd place, silver medalist(s)	Rolland Ezuruike (NGR)	175	184	189	220.2	
3rd place, bronze medalist(s)	Ali Jawad (ENG)	186	191	194	209.4	WR (at 59 kg)
4	Abede Fekadu (AUS)	158	162	~~165~~	176.6	
5	Samson Okutto (KEN)	160	~~165~~	165	175.6	
6	Pope Gazave (PNG)	~~125~~	~~125~~	125	161.9	
7	Ziggy Satkurin (PNG)	~~135~~	140	~~145~~	151.1	
8	Julien Sodjine Motto (CMR)	133	137	143	148	
9	Wasana Perera (SRI)	122	~~127~~	~~127~~	145.4	
10	Charles Teye (GHA)	~~135~~	135	140	137.1	
11	Jayasinha Rathnayaka Mudiyanselage (SRI)	~~135~~	135	~~137~~	132.5	
12	Gabriel Magu Wanjinku (KEN)	115	120	~~125~~	130.5	
13	Baabu Baambumba (UGA)	~~100~~	~~105~~	105	113.3	
14	Farman Basha (IND)	~~145~~	147	-	DNF	
