= Ndidi Nwosu =

Nigerian Paralympic powerlifter (1979-2020)

Personal information
- Born: 6 June 1979 Orlu, Nigeria
- Died: 1 March 2020 (aged 40) Owerri, Nigeria

Sport
- Country: Nigeria
- Sport: Paralympic powerlifting
Medal record
Women's powerlifting
Representing Nigeria
African Games
Gold medal – first place	2015 Brazzaville	-67 & -73 kg
Paralympic Games
Gold medal – first place	2016 Rio de Janeiro	73 kg
Commonwealth Games
Gold medal – first place	2018 Gold Coast	Heavyweight

Ndidi Nwosu (6 June 1979 – 1 March 2020) was a Nigerian powerlifter who had an upset victory at the 2016 Summer Paralympics. She lifted 140 kilograms. Ndidi became a professional powerlifter in 2008. She won gold in the Rio Paralympic Games in 2016. She also won gold in the 2018 Commonwealth Games which took place in Australia. she sustained an injury in the 2018 Commonwealth Games. The injury affected her spine and led to her having different surgeries in Owerri, Imo State Nigeria. After these surgeries, she was never the same again and could not participate in subsequent competitions.
