= Para powerlifting at the 2018 Commonwealth Games =

- Venue: Carrara Sports and Leisure Centre
- Dates: 10 April
- Competitors: 33 from 11 nations

Para powerlifting at the 2018 Commonwealth Games was held at the Carrara Sports and Leisure Centre in the Gold Coast, Australia on April 10. A total of 2 men's and 2 women's events were contested.

== Medal table ==
Rank	Nation	Gold	Silver	Bronze	Total
1	Nigeria	4	2	0	6
2	England	0	1	2	3
3	Malaysia	0	1	0	1
4	India	0	0	1	1
Totals (4 entries)		4	4	3	11

== Medalists ==
Event	Gold		Silver		Bronze	
Men's lightweight	Rolland Ezuruike; Nigeria	224.3 pts	Paul Kehinde; Nigeria	219.9 pts	Ali Jawad; England	182.7 pts
Men's heavyweight	Abdulazeez Ibrahim; Nigeria	191.9 pts	Jong Yee Khie; Malaysia	188.7 pts	Sachin Chaudhary; India	181.0 pts
Women's lightweight	Esther Oyema; Nigeria	141.6 pts (Note: Oyema set a new world record of 131 kg in the women's 50 kg weight category during this event.)	Lucy Ejike; Nigeria	134.1 pts	Zoe Newson; England	106.1 pts
Women's heavyweight	Ndidi Nwosu; Nigeria	110.4 pts	Louise Sugden; England	89.2 pts	Not awarded (only 4 entries)	

== Participating nations ==
There are 11 participating nations in para powerlifting with a total of 33 athletes. The number of athletes a nation entered is in parentheses beside the name of the country.

- Australia (5)
- England (6)
- India (4)
- Kenya (3)
- Malaysia (2)
- Nigeria (6)
- Rwanda (1)
- Scotland (1)
- Singapore (1)
- South Africa (1)
- Wales (3)
