= Natalie Blake =

British powerlifter (born 1982)

Personal information
- Born: 4 December 1982 (age 43) Manchester, England
- Height: 1.35 m (4 ft 5 in)
- Weight: 51 kg (112 lb)

Sport
- Country: England
- Sport: Powerlifting
- Event: Women's 61 kg

Achievements and titles
- Paralympic finals: 2016 Rio
Medal record
Representing England
Women's Powerlifting
Commonwealth Games
Silver medal – second place	2014 Glasgow	Women's 61 kg
- Updated on 10 October 2014

Natalie Blake (born 4 December 1982) is a British powerlifter. She competed for England in the women's 61 kg event at the 2014 Commonwealth Games where she won a silver medal. She also competed at the 2018 Commonwealth Games where she came 6th in the lightweight event.
