= Robert Songolo Ngijol =

Cameroonian basketball player

Beaujolais Basket
- Position: Point guard
- League: Nationale 2

Personal information
- Born: April 20, 1994 (age 32) Yaoundé, Cameroon
- Listed height: 1.90 m (6 ft 3 in)
- Listed weight: 77 kg (170 lb)

Career information
- High school: James Madison Memorial (Madison, Wisconsin)
- College: UIC (2012–2013); Minnesota State–Moorhead (2013–2016)
- NBA draft: 2016: undrafted
- Playing career: 2017–present

Career history
- 2017–2018: Zlatibor
- 2019–2020: ESC Longueau Amiens MSBB
- 2020–present: Beaujolais Basket

Robert Songolo Ngijol (born April 20, 1994) is a Cameroonian professional basketball player.

== College career ==
Songolo Ngijol played college basketball for the UIC Flames (2012–2013) and the Minnesota State–Moorhead Dragons (2013–2016).

== Professional career ==
On November 9, 2017, Songolo Ngijol signed for Zlatibor of the Basketball League of Serbia. On December 3, 2017, he made his debut for Zlatibor in a game against Mladost. He left Zlatibor in May 2018.

In 2019, he signed for ESC Longueau Amiens MSBB of the French 4th-tier Nationale 2. In 2020, he signed for Beaujolais Basket.

== International career ==
Songolo Ngijol was a member of the Cameroon national basketball team that played at the AfroBasket 2017. Over four tournament games, he averaged 9.3 points, 2.0 rebounds and 2.0 assists per game.

== See also ==
- List of foreign basketball players in Serbia
