= Blessing Onyebuchi =

Nigerian wrestler

Personal information
- Full name: Blessing Joy Onyebuchi

Sport
- Country: Nigeria
- Sport: Amateur wrestling
- Event: Freestyle
Medal record
Representing Nigeria
Women's freestyle wrestling
Commonwealth Games
Silver medal – second place	2018 Gold Coast	76 kg
Bronze medal – third place	2014 Glasgow	75 kg
African Games
Gold medal – first place	2019 Rabat	76 kg
Silver medal – second place	2015 Brazzaville	75 kg
African Wrestling Championships
Gold medal – first place	2019 Hammamet	76 kg
Silver medal – second place	2020 Algiers	76 kg
Women's beach wrestling
World Beach Games
Gold medal – first place	2019 Doha	+70 kg

Blessing Joy Onyebuchi is a Nigerian freestyle wrestler.

== Career ==
In 2014, she won the bronze medal in the women's freestyle 75 kg event at the Commonwealth Games held in Glasgow, Scotland. Four years later, at the 2018 Commonwealth Games held in Gold Coast, Australia, she won the silver medal in the women's freestyle 76 kg event. In the final, she lost against Erica Wiebe of Canada.

At the 2015 African Games held in Brazzaville, Republic of the Congo, she won the silver medal in the women's 75 kg event. The following year, she competed at the 2016 African & Oceania Wrestling Olympic Qualification Tournament where she won one of the bronze medals in her event.

At the 2019 African Wrestling Championships held in Hammamet, Tunisia, she won the gold medal in the women's freestyle 76 kg event. She also represented Nigeria at the 2019 African Games held in Rabat, Morocco and she won the gold medal in the women's 76 kg event. In the same year, she also competed at the World Beach Games where she won the gold medal in the women's +70 kg beach wrestling event.

In 2020, she won the silver medal in the women's freestyle 76 kg event at the African Wrestling Championships held in Algiers, Algeria. In the final, she lost against Samar Amer of Egypt.

== Achievements ==
Year	Tournament	Venue	Result	Event
2014	Commonwealth Games	Glasgow, Scotland	3rd	Freestyle 75 kg
2015	African Games	Brazzaville, Republic of the Congo	2nd	Freestyle 75 kg
2018	Commonwealth Games	Gold Coast, Australia	2nd	Freestyle 76 kg
2019	African Wrestling Championships	Hammamet, Tunisia	1st	Freestyle 76 kg
2019	African Games	Rabat, Morocco	1st	Freestyle 76 kg
2019	World Beach Games	Doha, Qatar	1st	Beach wrestling +70 kg
2020	African Wrestling Championships	Algiers, Algeria	2nd	Freestyle 76 kg
