= Ali Jawad =

British Paralympic powerlifter

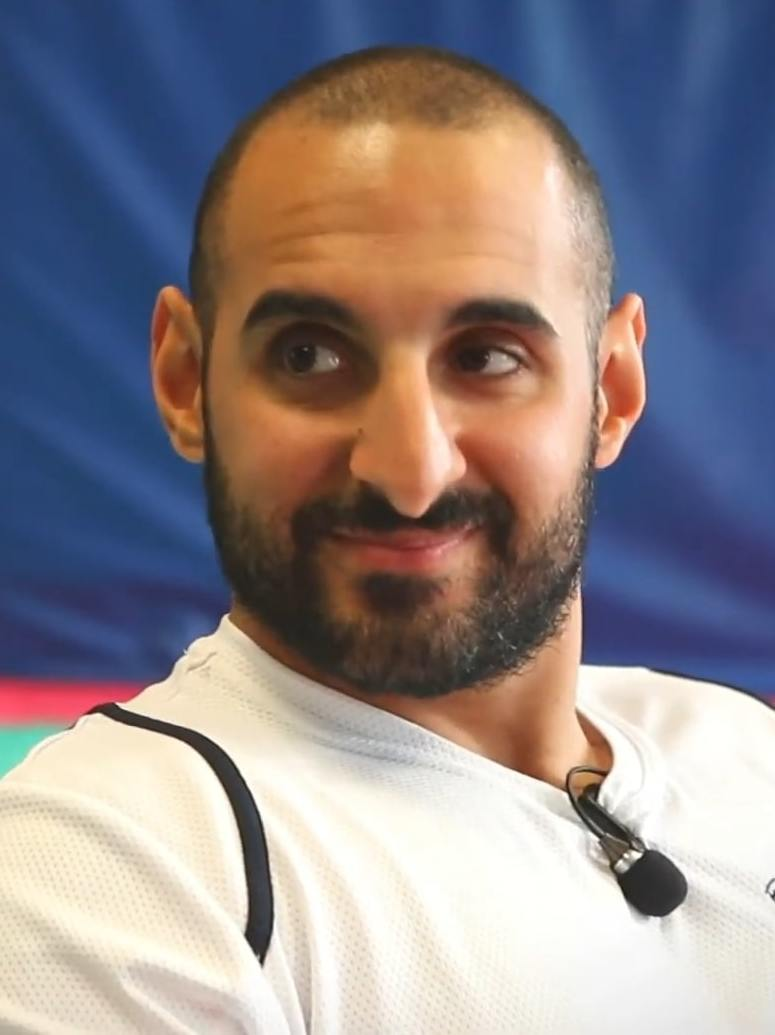
- Jawad in 2017

Personal information
- Nationality: British
- Born: 12 January 1989 (age 37) Beirut, Lebanon

Achievements and titles
- Paralympic finals: 2012
- Highest world ranking: 1st
- Personal best: 194 kg (−59kg) WR
Medal record
Men's para powerlifting
Representing Great Britain
Paralympic Games
Silver medal – second place	2016 Rio de Janeiro	−59 kg
World Championships
Gold medal – first place	2014 Dubai	−59 kg
European Championships
Gold medal – first place	2015 Eger	−65 kg
Representing England
Commonwealth Games
Bronze medal – third place	2014 Glasgow	72 kg
Bronze medal – third place	2018 Gold Coast	Lightweight

Ali Jawad (born 12 January 1989) is a British Paralympic powerlifter competing in the −59 kg class. Born without legs, he took up powerlifting at the age of 16. He competed in the 2012 Summer Paralympics in London, finishing fourth. The following year he took gold at the Asian Open Championships making a world record lift of 185.5 kg. At the 2014 IPC Powerlifting World Championships in Dubai, he became World Champion in his class, setting another world record, lifting 190 kg.

== Personal history ==
Jawad, who was born without legs, spent the first six months of his life in his parents' home country of Lebanon. Jawad has two short yet powerful stumps for legs, which end mid-thigh. His early life coincided with a conflict between Lebanon and Israel, and his parents chose to emigrate to Great Britain for their children's safety. The family took up residence in Tottenham, London, where Jawad attended Earlham Primary School, and later Woodside High School.

Jawad has also been diagnosed with Crohn's disease and is a high-profile supporter of charities which support sufferers of the disease. He almost died in 2010 from this disease.

== Powerlifting career ==
Jawad became a British Junior Powerlifting champion, and has set junior British and European records. He is currently ranked number 2 in the World Under-23 Powerlifting category. Jawad competes for the Wood Green Weightlifting Club, and the University of East London.

Jawad competed as an international-level Judoka before becoming a powerlifter. He won silver in the Junior World Championship powerlifting in 2006, and gold in the European Championships in 2007. He also won gold at the World junior championships in 2008, setting a British junior and senior record and a European junior record. He also lifted the second biggest weight in Great Britain's paralympic powerlifting history at just 19. He won junior gold at the European championships in 2007 and at 17 years old finishing 4th in the senior category.

In the run up to the 2016 Summer Paralympics in Rio, Jawad competed in the 2015 IPC European Powerlifting Championships in Eger, Hungary. There he secured a gold medal in the −65 kg class.

== See also ==
- List of people diagnosed with Crohn's disease
