= Berthe Etane Ngolle =

Cameroonian freestyle wrestler

Personal information
- Full name: Berthe Emillene Etane Ngolle
- Born: 19 May 1995 (age 31) Yaoundé, Cameroon

Sport
- Country: Cameroon
- Sport: Amateur wrestling
- Event: Freestyle
Medal record
Women's freestyle wrestling
Representing Cameroon
Commonwealth Games
Bronze medal – third place	2022 Birmingham	62 kg
African Games
Silver medal – second place	2015 Brazzaville	63 kg
Silver medal – second place	2019 Rabat	62 kg
African Championships
Gold medal – first place	2022 El Jadida	65 kg
Silver medal – second place	2017 Marrakesh	63 kg
Bronze medal – third place	2015 Alexandria	63 kg
Bronze medal – third place	2018 Port Harcourt	68 kg
Bronze medal – third place	2019 Hammamet	62 kg
Bronze medal – third place	2020 Algiers	62 kg
Jeux de la Francophonie
Silver medal – second place	2013 Nice	67 kg
Bronze medal – third place	2017 Abidjan	63 kg

Berthe Emillene Etane Ngolle (born 19 May 1995) is a Cameroonian freestyle wrestler. She is a two-time silver medalist at the African Games. She won one of the bronze medals in the women's 62 kg event at the 2022 Commonwealth Games held in Birmingham, England. She also won the gold medal in her event at the 2022 African Wrestling Championships held in El Jadida, Morocco.

She competed in the women's freestyle 62 kg event at the 2018 Commonwealth Games in Gold Coast, Australia.

In 2019, she represented Cameroon at the African Games and she won the silver medal in the women's freestyle 62 kg event.

In 2021, she competed at the African & Oceania Olympic Qualification Tournament hoping to qualify for the 2020 Summer Olympics in Tokyo, Japan. She finished in 3rd place. She also failed to qualify for the Olympics at the World Olympic Qualification Tournament held in Sofia, Bulgaria.
