= Paul Kehinde =

Nigerian Paralympic powerlifter (1988–2021)

Personal information
- Full name: Paul Olumide Kehinde
- Born: 7 July 1988 Lagos, Nigeria
- Died: 18 November 2021 (aged 33) Lagos, Nigeria
- Weight: 60 kg (132 lb)

Sport
- Country: Nigeria
- Sport: Powerlifting
- Weight class: 65–72 kg (143–159 lb)
Medal record
Men's powerlifting
Representing Nigeria
Paralympic Games
Gold medal – first place	2016 Rio de Janeiro	65 kg
World Para Championships
Gold medal – first place	2017 Mexico City	65 kg
Commonwealth Games
Gold medal – first place	2014 Glasgow	72 kg
Silver medal – second place	2018 Gold Coast	Lightweight
African Games
Gold medal – first place	2015 Brazzaville	65 kg

Paul Olumide Kehinde (7 July 1988 – 18 November 2021) was a Nigerian Para powerlifter. He was born in Epe, in Lagos state, Nigeria. He competed in the men's 65 kg class and also occasionally in the 72 kg class. At the 2014 Commonwealth Games he competed in the men's 72 kg event where he won a gold medal. Kehinde died 18 November 2021 in Lagos after a brief period of illness.

- Achievements:
- 2011 – World Championships Silver medalist
- 2014 – Commonwealth Games Gold medalist
- 2015 – Malaysia World Cup Gold medalist
- 2015 – All Africa Games Gold medalist setting an African Record of 214 kg.
- 2016 – Rio Paralympics- Broke the World Record twice with lifts of 218 kg & 220 kg
- 2017 – Mexico World Championships Gold medalist with another World Record lift of 220.5 kg.
- 2018 – World Para-Power lifting Championships, Fazza, Dubia. Gold medal with Record breaking lift of 221 kg .
- 2018 – Commonwealth Games, Gold Coast, Australia. Silver medalist in +65 kg Para-Power lifting
- 2018 August – African Para-Power lifting Championships +65 kg Gold medalist
- 2018 December – Nigerian National Sports Festival +65 kg Silver medalist.
