= Sakina Khatun =

Indian powerlifter (born 1989)

Personal information
- Born: 20 June 1989 (age 37) Basirhat, West Bengal, India
- Height: 1.47 m (4 ft 10 in)
- Weight: 40 kg (88 lb)

Sport
- Country: India
- Sport: Powerlifting
Medal record
Women's Powerlifting
Representing India
Asian Para Games
Silver medal – second place	2018 Jakarta	50 kg
Commonwealth Games
Bronze medal – third place	2014 Glasgow	61 kg

Sakina Khatun (born 20 June 1989) is an Indian powerlifter from West Bengal. She won bronze medal in the women's 61 kg event at the 2014 Commonwealth Games.

== Early life ==
Khatun was born in Basirhat, North 24 Parganas district, West Bengal. She was afflicted with polio since she was young. Her father worked as a marginal farmer and the family faced many difficulties financially. She had to undergo four surgeries to survive polio. As swimming helps strengthen most muscles in body, she was suggested by doctors to take up swimming. It was then that her journey with sports began. She did her schooling from Kabiriya High School, Madrasa. She was introduced to powerlifting by Farman Basha and started training after completing her class 12 in 2010.

== Powerlifting ==
Khatun represented India in the Commonwealth Games at Glasgow in 2014 and won a bronze medal in the women's light lifting category (up to 61 kg) with a total lift of 88.2kg. She also participated in 2020 Tokyo Paralympics where she stood 5th by lifting 93kg. She won a silver medal at the Asian Para Games in 2018.

She represented India in the World Championships in 2014 at Dubai, UAE and in 2017 at Mexico City, Mexico without much success. But she improved at the World Championships in Tbilisi, Geo in 2021. Later, she came sixth in the World Championships at Nur Sultan, Kazakhstan, 2019. She came sixth in the World Championships at Dubai, UAE in 2023.

== Awards ==
She was among the nine women achievers at the 2016 BREW awards organised by The Brew Magazine in Chennai on the occasion of 2016 International Women's Day.
