= Rolland Ezuruike =

Nigerian powerlifter (born 1976)

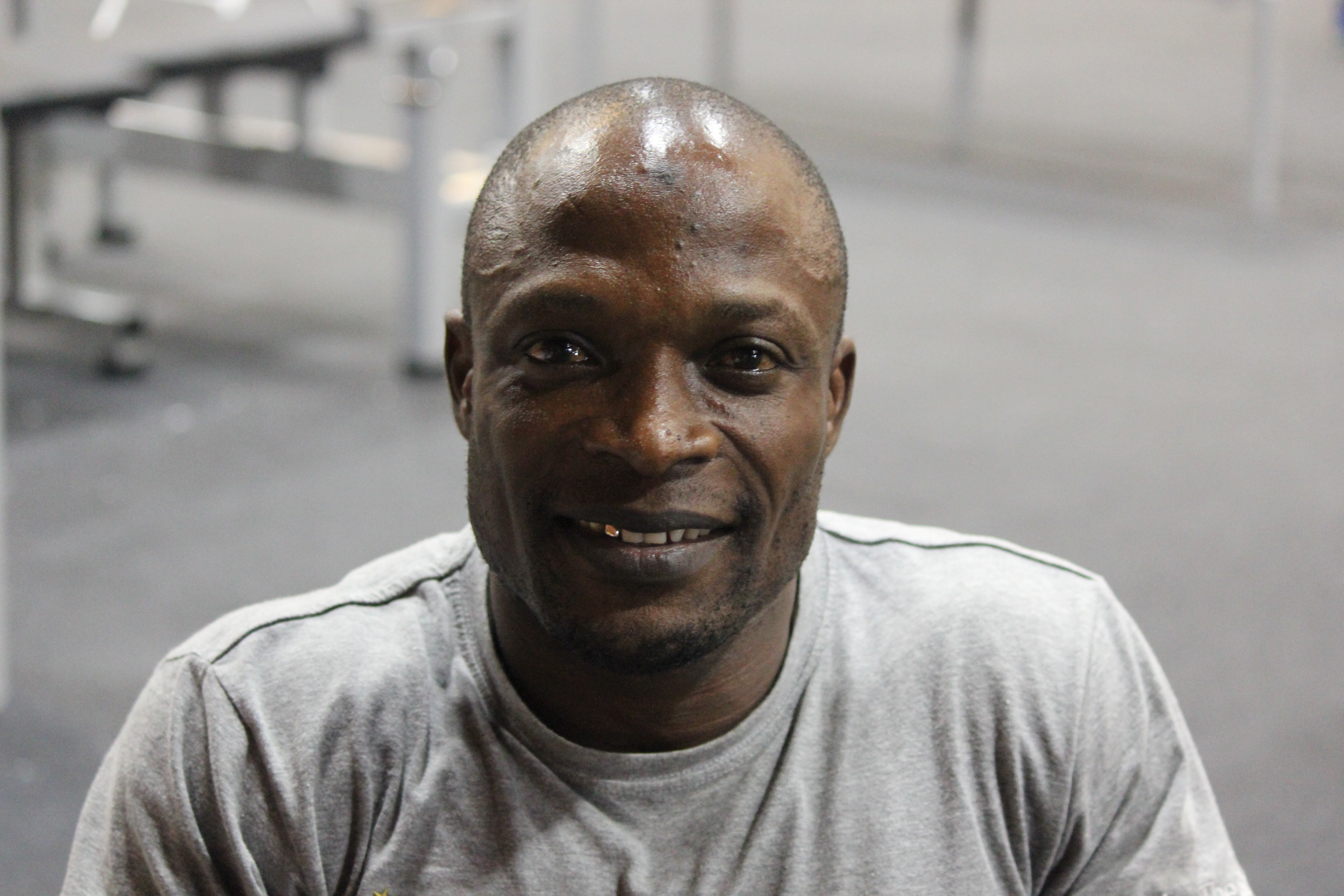
- Rolland Ezuruike in 2016

Personal information
- Nationality: Nigerian
- Born: 5 May 1976 (age 50) Obowo, Nigeria
- Weight: 50 kg (110 lb)

Sport
- Sport: Powerlifting
- Event: 72 kg
Medal record
Representing Nigeria
Men's powerlifting
Olympic Games
Gold medal – first place	2016 Rio de Janeiro	54 kg
African Games
Gold medal – first place	2015 Brazzaville	54 kg
Commonwealth Games
Gold medal – first place	2018 Gold Coast	Lightweight
Silver medal – second place	2014 Glasgow	72 kg
Silver medal – second place	2026 Glasgow	Lightweight
- Updated on 10 April 2018

Rolland Ezuruike// (born 5 May 1976) is a Nigerian powerlifter. He competed in the men's 72 kg event at the 2014 Commonwealth Games where he won a silver medal.

== Career ==
On 9 September 2016, he set a new paralympics record in the men's – 54kg category after lifting 200kg at the 2016 Summer Paralympics in Rio de Janeiro, Brazil. He also competed in the men's – 54kg category at the 2015 African Games, where he also won gold. Ezuruike improved his previous Commonwealth performance by winning gold in the men's lightweight powerlifting at the 2018 Commonwealth Games on the Gold Coast, Australia.
