= Esther Oyema =

Nigerian powerlifter (born 1982)

Personal information
- Nationality: Nigerian
- Born: 20 April 1982 (age 44)
- Weight: 48 kg (106 lb)

Sport
- Sport: Powerlifting
Medal record
Women's Powerlifting
Representing Nigeria
Paralympic Games
Gold medal – first place	2012 London	Women's 48kg
Silver medal – second place	2016 Rio	Women's 55kg
Commonwealth Games
Gold medal – first place	2010 Delhi	Women's Open bench press
Gold medal – first place	2014 Glasgow	Women's 61 kg
Gold medal – first place	2018 Gold Coast	Women's lightweight
Silver medal – second place	2026 Glasgow	Lightweight
- Updated on 24 July 2026

Esther Oyema (born 20 April 1982) is a Nigerian powerlifter.

== Career ==
Oyema competed in the women's 61 kg event at the 2014 Commonwealth Games where she won a gold medal and set a new world record by lifting 122.4 kg in the heavyweight category. In 2015, she won a gold medal at the All-Africa Games by lifting 133 kg, beating her previous record of 126 kg. In the same year, she traveled all the way to Almaty, Kazakhstan where she won another gold medal at the IPC Powerlifting Asian Open Championships by lifting 79 kg. During the 2016 Summer Paralympics she won a silver medal by beating her Mexican counterpart, Amalia Perez in the women's 55 kg lifting. She won a gold medal and created a new world record of 131 kg in the women's lightweight event at the 2018 Commonwealth games.

On May 21, 2020, the International Paralympic Committee (IPC) banned her for four years after failing a doping test. She competed at the 2019 International Paralympic competition held at the Oriental Hotel, Victoria Island in Lagos, where she won another gold medal, but this was later forfeited. Her urine sample was collected by the IPC during the competition and she tested positive for 19-norandrosterone.
