= Divya Kakran =

Indian freestyle wrestler

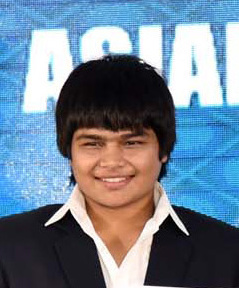
- Kakran at the 2018 Asian Games

Personal information
- Nationality: Indian
- Born: 2 July 1998 (age 28) Purbaliyan, Muzaffarnagar, Uttar Pradesh, India
- Education: Noida College of Physical Education
- Occupation: Naib Tehsildar
- Employer: Government of Uttar Pradesh
- Height: 1.65 m (5 ft 5 in)
- Spouse: Sachin Pratap Singh (m. 2023; sep. 2025)
Medal record
Women's freestyle wrestling
Asian Games
Bronze medal – third place	2018 Jakarta Palembang	68 kg
Asian Championships
Gold medal – first place	2021 Almaty	72 kg
Gold medal – first place	2020 New Delhi	68 kg
Silver medal – second place	2017 New Delhi	69 kg
Bronze medal – third place	2019 Xi'an	68 kg
Commonwealth Games
Bronze medal – third place	2018 Gold Coast	68 kg
Bronze medal – third place	2022 Birmingham	68 kg
Commonwealth Championships
Gold medal – first place	2017 Johannesburg	69 kg

Divya Kakran (born 2 July 1998) is an Indian freestyle wrestler. A multiple-time medalist at the Asian Championships, she has also won medals at the Asian Games and the Commonwealth Games. In recognition of her contributions to Indian wrestling, she was conferred with the Arjuna Award in 2020. Kakran is presently employed with the Government of Uttar Pradesh as a Naib Tehsildar.

== Personal life ==
Divya Kakran hails from Uttar Pradesh and belongs to a middle-class family from Purbaliyan village. Her father Suraj sold Langots for livelihood, which her mother sewed at home. Kakran studied Physical Education and Sports Sciences (BPES) at the Noida College of Physical Education in Dadri, India.

== Wrestling career ==
- 2017 Commonwealth Wrestling Championships - Kakran won a gold medal in the Commonwealth Championship held in South Johannesburg, Africa in December 2017.
- 2017 Asian Wrestling Championships - Kakran won a silver medal in the women's freestyle 69 kg event at the 2017 Asian Wrestling Championships in India.
- 2018 Bharat Kesri Dangal 23 March 2018 - Kakran won the Bharat Kesari title, held in Bhiwani, Haryana, India. In the final match of the competition, Kakran defeated Ritu Malik. Before this final match, Kakran defeated the international champion Geeta Phogat, who was famous enough to be portrayed in the movie Dangal.
- 2018 Asian Games Jakarta Palembang - Kakran won a bronze medal in the women's freestyle 68 kg event at the 2018 Asian Games in Jakarta and Palembang, beating Taipei's Chen Wenling on account of technical superiority.
- In the 2022 Birmingham Commonwealth Games, she won Bronze in Women's 68 kg freestyle wrestling after losing to Tokyo Olympic silver medallist and 11-time African champion Blessing Oborududu from Nigeria.
