= Tayla Ford =

New Zealand wrestler (born 1993)

Personal information
- Full name: Tayla Ford
- Nationality: New Zealand
- Born: 2 July 1993 (age 33) Nelson, New Zealand

Sport
- Country: New Zealand
- Sport: Wrestling
- Event: Women's Wrestling (FW/LF) 58 kg
Medal record
Freestyle wrestling
Representing New Zealand
Commonwealth Games
Bronze medal – third place	2014 Glasgow	58 kg
Bronze medal – third place	2022 Birmingham	68 kg
- Updated on 6 August 2022

Tayla Ford (born 2 July 1993) is a New Zealand freestyle wrestler. She has competed in three Commonwealth Games, winning two bronze medals. She was the first New Zealand woman to win a Commonwealth Games medal in wrestling. In April 2024, Ford was selected for the New Zealand wrestling team for the 2024 Summer Olympics, becoming the first New Zealand woman on an Olympic wrestling team.

== Biography ==
Ford is of Waikato Tainui descent. She was born in Nelson and moved with her family to Christchurch in 2000. She began wrestling when she was 16 years old after being inspired by her father, who had wrestled in high school.

She completed in the women's freestyle 58 kg event at the 2014 Commonwealth Games where she won the bronze medal. Ford also won a bronze medal at the 2022 Commonwealth Games.

In April 2024, Ford won her pool in the under-68 kg division at the Africa / Oceania qualifier in Egypt, thus securing qualification for the 2024 Olympic Games. She competed in the women's 68 kg event at the Olympics.

Ford lives in Adelaide, Australia, where she coaches wrestling. She also competes in jujutsu, and in 2022 won bronze at the Asia-Oceania regional competition.
