= Michelle Fazzari =

Canadian sport wrestler (1987–2024)

Personal information
- Born: Michelle Cristina Fazzari; July 10, 1987 Hamilton, Ontario, Canada
- Died: August 30, 2024 (aged 37)
- Education: Cayuga Secondary School
- Height: 173 cm (5 ft 8 in)
- Weight: 58 kg (128 lb)

Sport
- Sport: Freestyle wrestling
- Club: Brock Wrestling Club
Medal record
Women's freestyle wrestling
Representing Canada
World Championships
| Bronze medal – third place | 2017 Paris | 58 kg |
Commonwealth Games
| Silver medal – second place | 2018 Gold Coast | 62 kg |

Michelle Cristina Fazzari (July 10, 1987 – August 30, 2024) was a Canadian wrestler. She finished in 5th place at the 2014 World Wrestling Championships. Her highest career ranking was number 2 in the world.

Three weeks after undergoing knee surgery, Fazzari made her Pan Am Games debut at Toronto 2015, finishing seventh.

In July 2016, she was officially named to Canada's 2016 Olympic team.

In 2021, she won the gold medal in the 62 kg event at the Matteo Pellicone Ranking Series 2021 held in Rome, Italy.

Fazzari died from cancer on August 30, 2024, at the age of 37.
