= Amas Daniel =

Nigerian freestyle wrestler

Personal information
- Nationality: Nigerian
- Born: 26 April 1990 (age 36)

Sport
- Sport: Freestyle Wrestling
- Event: -65 kg
Medal record
Men's freestyle wrestling
Representing Nigeria
African Games
Gold medal – first place	2015 Brazzaville	-61 kg
- Updated on 25 August 2016

Amas Daniel (born 26 April 1990) is a Nigerian freestyle wrestler. At the 2016 Summer Olympics, he competed in the Men's freestyle -65 kg.

In 2021, he competed at the 2021 African & Oceania Wrestling Olympic Qualification Tournament hoping to qualify for the 2020 Summer Olympics in Tokyo, Japan.

He competed in the men's 65 kg event at the 2022 Commonwealth Games held in Birmingham, England.
