= Danielle Lappage =

Canadian wrestler (born 1990)

Personal information
- Full name: Danielle Suzanne Lappage
- Born: 24 September 1990 (age 35) Olds, Alberta, Canada
- Height: 165 cm (5 ft 5 in)
- Weight: 63 kg (139 lb)

Sport
- Sport: Wrestling
- Event: Freestyle
- Club: Burnaby Mountain Wrestling Club
- Coached by: Dave McKay
Medal record
Women's freestyle wrestling
Representing Canada
World Championships
Silver medal – second place	2018 Budapest	65 kg
Commonwealth Games
Silver medal – second place	2018 Gold Coast	68 kg
Gold medal – first place	2014 Glasgow	63 kg
Francophone Games
Gold medal – first place	2013 Nice	63 kg

Danielle Suzanne Lappage (born 24 September 1990) is a wrestler competing for Canada. She won a gold medal in the 63 kg freestyle at the 2014 Commonwealth Games in Glasgow. She finished in 5th place at the 2014 World Wrestling Championships.

== Sports career ==
In 2010 Lappage was crowned world junior champion at 63 kg.

In July 2016, she was officially named to Canada's 2016 Olympic team. At the 2016 Summer Olympics, she finished in 16th place after losing to Yuliya Tkach in the qualification round.

She represented Canada at the 2020 Summer Olympics in Tokyo, Japan. She competed in the women's freestyle 68 kg event.

== Personal life ==
Lappage is a graduate of Simon Fraser University and the University of Calgary Faculty of Law.
