= Aminat Adeniyi =

Nigerian freestyle wrestler

Personal information
- Full name: Aminat Oluwafunmilayo Adeniyi
- Nationality: Nigerian
- Born: 21 April 1993 (age 33) Akure, Nigeria
- Weight: 59 kg (130 lb)

Sport
- Sport: Wrestling
- Event: Women's 58 kg
Medal record
Representing Nigeria
Women's freestyle wrestling
Commonwealth Games
Gold medal – first place	2018 Gold Coast	Freestyle 62 kg
Gold medal – first place	2014 Glasgow	Freestyle 58 kg
- Updated on 16 October 2014

Aminat Oluwafunmilayo Adeniyi (born 21 April 1993) is a Nigerian freestyle wrestler. She competed in the women's freestyle 58 kg event at the 2014 Commonwealth Games where she won a gold medal.

She has been the National Champion in Wrestling in Nigeria since 2009 till date, a feat that has never been achieved by anyone in Nigeria. In 2010, she competed in Junior African Championship in Egypt, where she won a gold medal. She further continued her quest for glory when she competed in Senior African Wrestling Championship in Morocco in 2012, where she was a silver medalist.

In 2013, Aminat Adeniyi was also a Nigerian sportswoman representative to the Commonwealth Championship in South Africa, where she won a silver medal. She equally participated in the Senior African Wrestling Championship in Tunisia, 2014, where she was crowned African champion of her category. Her international achievement outside the shore of Africa was in Commonwealth Championship in the same 2014 Glasgow, Scotland, where she won gold.

She also, as an athlete, participated in the Senior African Wrestling Championship in Egypt, 2015, where she completed the tournament as a silver medalist. In 2015, the eleventh All African African Games in Congo Brazzaville, she was a Nigerian representative in her category as a wrestler, and she won gold. A year later, in 2016, she competed in the Senior African Wrestling Championship held in Egypt, where she won a gold medal. During the same year, 2016, she won silver medal in an Olympics qualification in Algeria, which qualified her as an athlete in Rio 2016 Olympics events. She participated in the Grand Prix of Spain in 2016, where she won bronze medal.

In 2017, she was an African champion in the senior category of the wrestling championship held in Morocco. In the same 2017, she wrestled at the Wrestling World Championship in France, where she became Number eight(8) in the world. Also, in 2018, she participated in the Senior African Wrestling Championship held in Port-Harcourt, Rivers State, Nigeria and won the gold medal.

She was bestowed with national honour, Member of Order of Niger, MON by the former President Goodluck Jonathan in 2014 in recognition of her grand achievements in sports.

She was part of Nigerian contingents, as a freestyle wrestler, to the 2019 African Games held in Rabat, Morocco, where she defeated Etane Ngollo B. from Cameroon, on a winning streak, without conceding a point during the final encounter, to emerge gold medalist of 62 kg category which has made her be the back-to-back champion.

Education

She attended Adekunle Ajasin University, Akungba Akoko, Ondo State, Nigeria where bagged first degree in Political Science, 2012. While in university, she was the sporting director of the political science department between 2010- 2011. She was also voted unopposed as the sporting director of the faculty of the social and management sciences of Adekunle Ajasin University between 2011-2012, the post she held till she finished her first degree in 2012.

In 2020, she won the silver medal in the women's freestyle 62 kg event at the 2020 African Wrestling Championships. She qualified at the 2021 African & Oceania Wrestling Olympic Qualification Tournament to represent Nigeria at the 2020 Summer Olympics in Tokyo, Japan. She competed in the women's freestyle 62 kg event.
