= Gold Coast Sports and Leisure Centre =

Multi-purpose arena and sports facility in Australia

GC Sports and Leisure Centre
- Interactive map of GC Sports and Leisure Centre
- Former names: Carrara Sports and Leisure Centre (2016–2018)
- Address: Broadbeach-Nerang Road; Carrara, Queensland
- Owner: Gold Coast City Council
- Capacity: 5,300

Construction
- Groundbreaking: 2016; 10 years ago
- Opened: April 2017; 9 years ago
- Architect: BVN Architecture

Tenant
- Brisbane Roar FC (training) (2020–2023)

The Gold Coast Sports and Leisure Centre (GCSLC) is a multi-purpose arena and sports facility located in the Gold Coast suburb of Carrara, Queensland. The centre is located adjacent to the Carrara Indoor Stadium and forms a part of the Gold Coast Sports Precinct.

Since 2017, the centre has been the training and administrative headquarters of the Gold Coast Suns, which competes in the Australian Football League (AFL). Reserves and practice matches have been played on the training oval located outside the centre's building.

== History ==
Construction of the centre began in 2016 in preparation for the 2018 Commonwealth Games. It was completed in April 2017.

Seven courts are located inside Hall One, with the grandstand seating for up to 5,300 people, while Hall Two includes eight courts and 350 seats. During the Commonwealth Games, the centre hosted badminton, powerlifting, weightlifting and wrestling competitions.

On 7 July 2018, the GCSLC hosted a Suncorp Super Netball match between Queensland Firebirds and Melbourne Vixens.

In October 2020, A-League club Brisbane Roar FC moved to GCSLC after a dispute with Logan City Council over an unpaid water bill at the Logan Centre of Excellence. The club remained at the centre until returning to Ballymore Stadium in October 2023.

GCSLC hosted both matches of the 2025 wheelchair rugby league Ashes.

During the 2025–26 season, the Brisbane Bullets hosted two regular season National Basketball League games at GCSLC.

Other uses for the venue since its construction have included international netball tournaments, regional careers expos, TAFE Queensland sports courses, futsal championships, basketball championships, gymnastics championships, judo championships and cheerleading championships.

The venue will be used in the future for judo and wrestling at the 2032 Summer Olympics and boccia at the 2032 Summer Paralympics.

== Carrara Training Oval ==
View of Carrara training oval from the Gold Coast Sports and Leisure Centre in November 2026

The Carrara Training Oval is located directly outside the GCSLC building. It has a capacity of 1,000 people, although spectator facilities are minimal.

Prior to the ground's development, the Gold Coast Suns trained on a natural turf oval on the south-eastern side of Carrara Stadium. However, it was limited by poor drainage and site constraints which the impacted the oval's dimensions.

The new training oval was constructed in 2016 on the north-western side of the stadium. For the 2018 Commonwealth Games, it featured an athletics track to serve as the official warm-up venue for athletics events, which were held inside Carrara Stadium.

In 2021, Carrara Training Oval hosted its first match for premiership points in the Victorian Football League (VFL), when Gold Coast played Southport in round 11. The match was abandoned for no result after ten minutes of play because of the announcement of a snap lockdown affecting south-eastern Queensland. Greater Western Sydney hosted Brisbane at the ground in round 15 because of COVID-19 restrictions in New South Wales.

Further VFL matches were played at Carrara Training Oval in 2022 and 2023. An unofficial AFL pre-season practice match between Gold Coast and Essendon took place at the ground on 23 February 2023.

Under naming rights, the ground has been known as Austworld Centre Oval since November 2018. The ground has also been referred to as the Council Training Oval.

== See also ==
- Gold Coast Sports Precinct
- Sports on the Gold Coast, Queensland
- Venues of the 2018 Commonwealth Games
