= Aline Rotter-Focken =

German freestyle wrestler

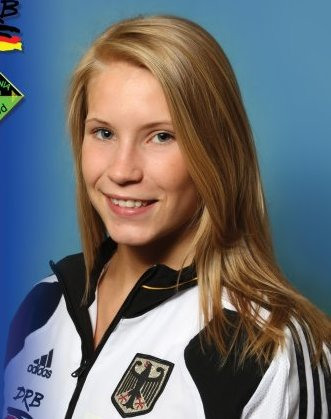
- Focken in 2011

Personal information
- Born: Aline Focken; 10 May 1991 (age 35) Krefeld, Germany
- Height: 1.76 m (5 ft 9 in)
- Weight: 80 kg (176 lb)

Sport
- Country: Germany
- Sport: Freestyle wrestling
- Weight class: 69 kg / 76 kg
- Club: KSV Germania, Krefeld
- Coached by: Hans-Georg Focken
Medal record
Women's freestyle wrestling
Representing Germany
Olympic Games
Gold medal – first place	2020 Tokyo	76 kg
World Championships
Gold medal – first place	2014 Tashkent	69 kg
Silver medal – second place	2017 Paris	69 kg
Bronze medal – third place	2015 Las Vegas	69 kg
Bronze medal – third place	2019 Nur-Sultan	76 kg
European Games
Bronze medal – third place	2015 Baku	69 kg
European Wrestling Championships
Bronze medal – third place	2013 Tbilisi	67 kg
Bronze medal – third place	2019 Bucharest	76 kg
Bronze medal – third place	2020 Rome	76 kg
Individual World Cup
Gold medal – first place	2020 Belgrade	76 kg
Golden Grand Prix Ivan Yarygin
Bronze medal – third place	2019 Krasnoyarsk	76 kg
Sassari City Matteo Pellicone Memorial
Bronze medal – third place	2019 Sassari	76 kg
Dan Kolov - Nikola Petrov Tournament
Bronze medal – third place	2019 Sofia	76 kg

Aline Rotter-Focken (née Focken; born 10 May 1991) is a German freestyle wrestler. She won the world title in the 69 kg division in 2014 and a bronze medal in the 67 kg category at the 2013 European Championships. At the 2020 Summer Olympics in Tokyo she won the Gold.

== Career ==
She started wrestling in 1996 under the guidance of her father, Hans-Georg Focken.

In 2020, she won the gold medal in the women's 76 kg event at the 2020 Individual Wrestling World Cup held in Belgrade, Serbia. In 2021, she won the gold medal in her event at the 2021 Poland Open held in Warsaw, Poland. She took gold at the 2020 Summer Olympics in Tokyo.

== Match results ==
World Championships & Olympics & Ranking Games
Res.	Record	Opponent	Head-to-Head	Round	Score	Note	Date	Event	Location	Video
2020 UWW World (gold) at 76 kg
Win		(Turkey) Yasemin Adar	1-4	Gold medal	2-1	Win by fall	16 December 2020	2020 Individual Wrestling World Cup	Belgrade, Serbia	
Win		(Kyrgyzstan) Aiperi Medet Kyzy	1-0	Semifinal	6-4		15 December 2020	2020 Individual Wrestling World Cup	Belgrade, Serbia	
Win		(Russia) Ekaterina Bukina	2-0	Quarterfinal	10-0	Win by Superiority	15 December 2020	2020 Individual Wrestling World Cup	Belgrade, Serbia	
2020 UWW European (bronze) at 76 kg
Win		(France) Denise LECARPENTIER	1-0	Bronze medal	10-0	Win by Superiority	13 February 2020	European Championship 2020	Rome, Italy	
Win		(Poland) Kamila Czeslawa KULWICKA	1-0	Repechage	10-0	Win by Superiority	12 February 2020	European Championship 2020	Rome, Italy	
Loss		(Turkey) Yasemin Adar	1-4	Round of 8	4-5		12 February 2020	European Championship 2020	Rome, Italy	
2020 UWW Matteo Pellicone (bronze) at 76 kg
Win		(Belarus) Vasilisa Marzaliuk	1-1	Bronze medal	4-2		16 January 2020	Matteo Pellicone 2020	Rome, Italy	
Win		(Venezuela) Andrimar Daniela LAZARO DIAZ	1-0	Repechage	10-0	Win by Superiority	16 January 2020	Matteo Pellicone 2020	Rome, Italy	
Loss		(Canada) Erica Elizabeth Wiebe	0-5	Quarterfinals	0-3		16 January 2020	Matteo Pellicone 2020	Rome, Italy	
Win		(Ukraine) Alla Belinska	4-0	Round of 8	5-2		16 January 2020	Matteo Pellicone 2020	Rome, Italy	
2019 UWW World (bronze) at 76 kg
Win		(Kazakhstan) Elmira Syzdykova	2-0	Bronze medal	3-0		19 September 2019	2019 World Wrestling Championships	Nur-Sultan, Kazakhstan	
Loss		(United States) Adeline Gray	0-1	Semifinals	2-5		18 September 2019	2019 World Wrestling Championships	Nur-Sultan, Kazakhstan	
Win		(Ukraine) Alla Belinska	4-0	Quarerfinals	5-1		18 September 2019	2019 World Wrestling Championships	Nur-Sultan, Kazakhstan	
Win		(Azerbaijan) Sabira Aliyeva	1-0	Round of 16	10-0	Win by Superiority	18 September 2019	2019 World Wrestling Championships	Nur-Sultan, Kazakhstan	
Win		(India) Kiran Bishnoi	1-0	Round of 32	5-4		18 September 2019	2019 World Wrestling Championships	Nur-Sultan, Kazakhstan	
2019 UWW Yasar Dogu (bronze) at 76 kg
Loss		(Turkey) Yasemin Adar	1-4	Bronze medal	3-10		14 July 2019	Yasar Dogu 2019	(Turkey) Istanbul, Italy	
Loss		(Canada) Erica Elizabeth Wiebe	0-5	Semifinal	0-3		13 July 2019	Yasar Dogu 2019	(Turkey) Istanbul, Italy	
Win		(Kazakhstan) Elmira Syzdykova	2-0	Quarterfinal	2-1		13 July 2019	Yasar Dogu 2019	(Turkey) Istanbul, Italy	
Win		(Kazakhstan) Gulmaral Yerkebayeva	2-0	Round of 8	11-0	Win by Superiority	13 July 2019	Yasar Dogu 2019	(Turkey) Istanbul, Italy	
2019 UWW Ranking Games (bronze) at 76 kg
Win		(Norway) Iselin Maria Moen SOLHEIM	1-0	Bronze medal	8-0		24 May 2019	24th International Tournament, City of Sassari	Sassari, Italy	
Loss		(Canada) Erica Elizabeth Wiebe	0-5	Semifinal	3-2		24 May 2019	24th International Tournament, City of Sassari	Sassari, Italy	
Win		(Kazakhstan) Gulmaral Yerkebayeva	2-0	Quarterfinal	5-4		24 May 2019	24th International Tournament, City of Sassari	Sassari, Italy	
Win		(Brazil) Aline Da Silva Ferreira	1-0	Round of 8	4-3		24 May 2019	24th International Tournament, City of Sassari	Sassari, Italy	
2019 UWW European (bronze) at 76 kg
Win		(Lithuania) Kamilė Gaučaitė	1-0	Bronze medal	6-0	Win by fall	11 April 2019	2019 European Wrestling Championships	Bucharest, Romania	
Loss		(Turkey) Yasemin Adar	1-4	Semifinal	5-2		10 April 2019	2019 European Wrestling Championships	Bucharest, Romania	
Win		(Estonia) Epp Mäe	1-1	Quarterfinal	8-4		10 April 2019	2019 European Wrestling Championships	Bucharest, Romania	
Win		(Ukraine) Alla Belinska	4-0	Round of 8	6-0		10 April 2019	2019 European Wrestling Championships	Bucharest, Romania	
Win		(Italy) Enrica Rinaldi	1-0	Qualification	11–0		10 April 2019	2019 European Wrestling Championships	Bucharest, Romania	
2019 Dan Kolov - Nikola Petrov (bronze) at 76 kg
Win		(China) Juan Wang	1-0	Bronze medal	7-2		2 March 2019	2019 Dan Kolov - Nikola Petrov Tournament	Sofia, Bulgaria	
Loss		(Turkey) Yasemin Adar	1-4	Semifinal	6-5	Win by fall	1 March 2019	2019 Dan Kolov - Nikola Petrov Tournament	Sofia, Bulgaria	
Win		(Ukraine) Alla Belinska	4-0	Quarterfinal	12-1		1 March 2019	2019 Dan Kolov - Nikola Petrov Tournament	Sofia, Bulgaria	
Win		(Bulgaria) Boryana Tsvetkova Borisova	2-0	Round of 8	10-0		1 March 2019	2019 Dan Kolov - Nikola Petrov Tournament	Sofia, Bulgaria	
Grand Prix Ivan Yariguin 2019 (bronze) at 76 kg
Win		(Cuba) Mabelkis Capote Perez	1-0	Bronze medal	4-0	Win By Fall	27 January 2019	Grand Prix Ivan Yariguin 2019	Krasnoyarsk, Russia	
Loss		(Belarus) Vasilisa Marzaliuk	1-1	Semifinal	5-5		26 January 2019	Grand Prix Ivan Yariguin 2019	Krasnoyarsk, Russia	
Win		(Mongolia) Naranchimeg Gelegjamts	1-0	Quarterfinal	10-3		26 January 2019	Grand Prix Ivan Yariguin 2019	Krasnoyarsk, Russia	
Win		(Russia) Kseniia Burakova	1-0	Round of 8	7-0		26 January 2019	Grand Prix Ivan Yariguin 2019	Krasnoyarsk, Russia	
2018 UWW World 8th at 76 kg
Lose		(Canada) Erica Elizabeth Wiebe	0-5	Quarterfinal	4-6		24 October 2019	2018 World Wrestling Championships	Budapest, Hungary	
Win		(France) Cynthia Vescan	1-0	Round of 16	4-0		24 October 2019	2018 World Wrestling Championships	Budapest, Hungary	
Win		(Ukraine) Anastasia Shustova	2-0	Round of 32	12-0		24 October 2019	2018 World Wrestling Championships	Budapest, Hungary	
2018 Poland Open (silver) at 76 kg
Loss		(Canada) Erica Elizabeth Wiebe	0-5	Gold medal	0-7		9 September 2018	Poland Open 2018	Warsaw, Poland	
Win		(China) Paliha Paliha	1-0	Semifinal	8-0	Win by fall	8 September 2019	Poland Open 2018	Warsaw, Poland	
Win		(Ukraine) Anastasiia Shustova	2-0	Quarterfinal	8-0	Win by fall	8 September 2019	Poland Open 2018	Warsaw, Poland	
2018 Dan Kolov - Nikola Petrov (gold) at 76 kg
Win		(Russia) Ekaterina Bukina	2–0	Gold medal	10-0	Win by Superiority	24 March 2018	2018 Dan Kolov - Nikola Petrov Tournament	Sofia, Bulgaria	
Win		(Moldova) Svetlana Saenko	1-0	Semifinal	3-0	Win by fall	23 March 2018	2018 Dan Kolov - Nikola Petrov Tournament	Sofia, Bulgaria	
Win		(Poland) Anna Urbanowicz	4-0	Quarterfinal	10-0	Win by Superiority	23 March 2018	2018 Dan Kolov - Nikola Petrov Tournament	Sofia, Bulgaria	
2018 UWW World 8th at Klippan Lady Open 76]								2018 Dan Kolov - Nikola Petrov Tournament	Sofia, Bulgaria	
Lose		(Estonia) Epp Mäe	1-1	Quarterfinal	2-6		16 February 2018	Klippan Lady Open 2018	Klippan, Sweden	
Win		(Canada) Leah Mariem Lorraine Ferguson	1-0	Qualification	11-1	(4:43)	16 February 2018	Klippan Lady Open 2018	Klippan, Sweden	
2017 UWW World (silver) at 69 kg
Loss		(Japan) Sara Dosho	0-1	Gold medal	0-3		August, 2017	2017 World Wrestling Championships	Paris, France	
