= 2013 European Wrestling Championships – Women's freestyle 72 kg =

The women's freestyle 72 kg is a competition featured at the 2013 European Wrestling Championships, and was held at the Tbilisi Sports Palace in Tbilisi, Georgia on 22 March 2013.

== Medalists ==
Gold	Natalia Vorobieva; Russia
Silver	Maider Unda; Spain
Bronze	Vasilisa Marzaliuk; Belarus
Bronze	Kateryna Burmistrova; Ukraine

== Results ==
Legend

- F — Won by fall

=== Main Draw ===
Round of 16
Vasilisa Marzaliuk (BLR)	6	5
Yasemin Adar (TUR)	0	2
Agnieszka Wieszczek (POL)	3	4
Svetlana Saenko (MDA)	0	1
Sabira Aliyeva (AZE)	1	1	4
Viktoria Bobeva (BUL)	2	0	1
Maria Selmaier (GER)	0	0
Marina Gastl (AUT)	1	2
Kateryna Burmistrova (UKR)	0	1
Natalia Vorobieva (RUS)	1	3

Quarterfinals
Epp Mäe (EST)	0	0
Maider Unda (ESP)	1	2
Éva Németh (HUN)	0	0
Vasilisa Marzaliuk (BLR)	6	4^{F}
Agnieszka Wieszczek (POL)	3	4
Sabira Aliyeva (AZE)	0	1
Marina Gastl (AUT)	0
Natalia Vorobieva (RUS)	5^{F}

Semifinals
Maider Unda (ESP)	1	1
Vasilisa Marzaliuk (BLR)	0	0
Agnieszka Wieszczek (POL)	0
Natalia Vorobieva (RUS)	4^{F}

Final
Maider Unda (ESP)	0	0
Natalia Vorobieva (RUS)	4	2

=== Repechage ===
Repechage round 1
Kateryna Burmistrova (UKR)	1	1
Marina Gastl (AUT)	0	0

Bronze medals
Epp Mäe (EST)	0	1
Vasilisa Marzaliuk (BLR)	4	4^{F}
Kateryna Burmistrova (UKR)	1	1	3
Agnieszka Wieszczek (POL)	0	1	0
