= 2017 Dan Kolov & Nikola Petrov Tournament =

Dan Kolov & Nikola Petrov 2017
- Host city: Ruse, Bulgaria
- Dates: 7–9 April

The 55th Dan Kolov & Nikola Petrov Tournament was a sport wrestling event held in Ruse, Bulgaria between 7 and 9 April 2017.

This international tournament includes competition in both men's and women's freestyle wrestling and men's Greco-Roman wrestling. This tournament is held in honor of Dan Kolov who was the first European freestyle wrestling champion from Bulgaria and European and World Champion Nikola Petroff.

== Event videos ==
The event was aired freely on the Bulgarian Wrestling Federation Live YouTube channel.

Broadcast
8 April 2017-Qualification Mat A	8 April 2017-Qualification Mat B	8 April 2017-Qualification Mat C	
9 April 2017-Qualification Mat A	9 April 2017-Qualification Mat B	9 April 2017-Qualification Mat C	9 April 2017-Finals Mat D

== Medal table ==
Rank	Nation	Gold	Silver	Bronze	Total
1	Bulgaria	5	4	5	14
2	Turkey	3	4	5	12
3	Russia	3	1	2	6
4	Hungary	2	2	2	6
5	Ukraine	2	2	1	5
6	Azerbaijan	2	0	5	7
7	Belarus	2	0	0	2
8	Kazakhstan	1	3	7	11
9	Germany	1	1	3	5
10	Romania	1	1	1	3
11	Poland	1	0	2	3
12	Mongolia	1	0	0	1
13	Kyrgyzstan	0	3	1	4
14	Sweden	0	2	2	4
15	India	0	1	2	3
16	South Korea	0	0	4	4
17	Italy	0	0	2	2
18	Georgia	0	0	1	1
18	Macedonia	0	0	1	1
18	Moldova	0	0	1	1
18	Tunisia	0	0	1	1
Totals (21 entries)		24	24	48	96

== Medal overview ==
=== Men's freestyle ===
Event	Gold	Silver	Bronze
57 kg	Erdenebatyn Bekhbayar; Mongolia	Andrei Dukov; Romania	Mahir Amiraslanov; Azerbaijan
57 kg	Erdenebatyn Bekhbayar; Mongolia	Andrei Dukov; Romania	Givi Davidovi; Italy
61 kg	Dzhamal Otarsultanov; Russia	Münir Recep Aktaş; Turkey	Zelimkhan Abakarov; Russia
61 kg	Dzhamal Otarsultanov; Russia	Münir Recep Aktaş; Turkey	Timur Aitkulov; Kazakhstan
65 kg	Borislav Novachkov; Bulgaria	Bajrang Punia; India	Magomed Muslimov; Azerbaijan
65 kg	Borislav Novachkov; Bulgaria	Bajrang Punia; India	Meizhan Ashirov; Kazakhstan
70 kg	Magomedrasul Gazimagomedov; Russia	Nikolay Kurtev; Bulgaria	Ruslan Dibirgadjiyev; Azerbaijan
70 kg	Magomedrasul Gazimagomedov; Russia	Nikolay Kurtev; Bulgaria	Alexander Semisorow; Germany
74 kg	Kakhaber Khubezhty; Russia	Bulat Sakaev; Kazakhstan	Ahmet Ertürk; Turkey
74 kg	Kakhaber Khubezhty; Russia	Bulat Sakaev; Kazakhstan	Zhiger Zakirov; Kazakhstan
86 kg	Zbigniew Baranowski; Poland	Shamil Kudiyamagomedov; Russia	Irakli Mtsituri; Georgia
86 kg	Zbigniew Baranowski; Poland	Shamil Kudiyamagomedov; Russia	Adilet Davlumbayev; Kazakhstan
97 kg	Rıza Yıldırım; Turkey	Fatih Yaşarlı; Turkey	Magomedgadji Nurov; Macedonia
97 kg	Rıza Yıldırım; Turkey	Fatih Yaşarlı; Turkey	Anzor Urishev; Russia
125 kg	Alen Zasieiev; Ukraine	Inkar Yermukambet; Kazakhstan	Şakir Bozkurt; Turkey
125 kg	Alen Zasieiev; Ukraine	Inkar Yermukambet; Kazakhstan	Dániel Ligeti; Hungary

=== Greco-Roman ===
Event	Gold	Silver	Bronze
59 kg	Ivo Angelov; Bulgaria	Hammet Rustem; Turkey	Taleh Mammadov; Azerbaijan
59 kg	Ivo Angelov; Bulgaria	Hammet Rustem; Turkey	Radoslav Vasilev; Bulgaria
66 kg	Kamran Mammadov; Azerbaijan	Abdülsamet Günal; Turkey	Sung-hoon Oh; South Korea
66 kg	Kamran Mammadov; Azerbaijan	Abdülsamet Günal; Turkey	Deyvid Dimitrov; Bulgaria
71 kg	Rasul Chunayev; Azerbaijan	Ruslan Tsarev; Kyrgyzstan	Nurgazi Asangulov; Kyrgyzstan
71 kg	Rasul Chunayev; Azerbaijan	Ruslan Tsarev; Kyrgyzstan	Bálint Korpási; Hungary
75 kg	Furkan Bayrak; Turkey	Tarek Sheble Mohamed; Bulgaria	Manfred Edsberg; Sweden
75 kg	Furkan Bayrak; Turkey	Tarek Sheble Mohamed; Bulgaria	Yunus Emre Başar; Turkey
80 kg	Daniel Aleksandrov; Bulgaria	László Szabó; Hungary	Ilian Georgiev; Bulgaria
80 kg	Daniel Aleksandrov; Bulgaria	László Szabó; Hungary	Bogdan Kourinnoi; Sweden
85 kg	Péter Bácsi; Hungary	Azat Beishebekov; Kyrgyzstan	Mohamed Missaoui; Tunisia
85 kg	Péter Bácsi; Hungary	Azat Beishebekov; Kyrgyzstan	Nikolai Bayrakov; Bulgaria
98 kg	Balázs Kiss; Hungary	Uzur Dzhuzupbekov; Kyrgyzstan	Dimitriy Timchenko; Ukraine
98 kg	Balázs Kiss; Hungary	Uzur Dzhuzupbekov; Kyrgyzstan	Süleyman Demirci; Turkey
130 kg	Alin Alexuc-Ciurariu; Romania	Mykola Kuchmii; Ukraine	Min-Seok Kim; South Korea
130 kg	Alin Alexuc-Ciurariu; Romania	Mykola Kuchmii; Ukraine	Constantin Hutuleac; Romania

=== Women's freestyle ===
Event	Gold	Silver	Bronze
48 kg	Miglena Selishka; Bulgaria	Fredrika Petersson; Sweden	Ritu Phogat; India
48 kg	Miglena Selishka; Bulgaria	Fredrika Petersson; Sweden	Kim Yeo-jin; South Korea
53 kg	Vanesa Kaladzinskaya; Belarus	Zhuldyz Eshimova-Turtbayeva; Kazakhstan	Roksana Zasina; Poland
53 kg	Vanesa Kaladzinskaya; Belarus	Zhuldyz Eshimova-Turtbayeva; Kazakhstan	Nina Hemmer; Germany
55 kg	Katsiaryna Yanushkevich; Belarus	Bilyana Dudova; Bulgaria	Shin Hye Lee; South Korea
55 kg	Katsiaryna Yanushkevich; Belarus	Bilyana Dudova; Bulgaria	Nuray Karadağ; Turkey
58 kg	Gulshaharat Talasova; Kazakhstan	Emese Barka; Hungary	Mariana Cherdivara; Moldova
58 kg	Gulshaharat Talasova; Kazakhstan	Emese Barka; Hungary	Nataliya Synyshyn; Azerbaijan
60 kg	Mimi Hristova; Bulgaria	Johanna Mattsson; Sweden	Gabriella Sleisz; Hungary
60 kg	Mimi Hristova; Bulgaria	Johanna Mattsson; Sweden	Ayaulym Kassymova; Kazakhstan
63 kg	Yuliya Ostapchuk; Ukraine	Taybe Yusein; Bulgaria	Sara Da Col; Italy
63 kg	Yuliya Ostapchuk; Ukraine	Taybe Yusein; Bulgaria	Monika Michalik; Poland
69 kg	Aline Rotter-Focken; Germany	Alla Cherkasova; Ukraine	Divya Kakran; India
69 kg	Aline Rotter-Focken; Germany	Alla Cherkasova; Ukraine	Elmira Syzdykova; Kazakhstan
76 kg	Yasemin Adar; Turkey	Maria Selmaier; Germany	Gulmaral Yerkebayeva; Kazakhstan
76 kg	Yasemin Adar; Turkey	Maria Selmaier; Germany	Anna Schell; Germany

== Participating nations ==
413 competitors from 40 nations participated.

- Albania (1)
- Algeria (13)
- Azerbaijan (13)
- Belarus (4)
- Bulgaria (61)
- Czech Republic (1)
- Egypt (1)
- Spain (12)
- France (7)
- Georgia (13)
- Germany (12)
- Greece (8)
- Guatemala (1)
- Hungary (16)
- India (25)
- Iran (7)
- Israel (3)
- Italy (9)
- Japan (3)
- Kazakhstan (44)
- Kyrgyzstan (12)
- South Korea (24)
- Kosovo (1)
- Lithuania (1)
- Moldova (7)
- Mongolia (3)
- Macedonia (4)
- Poland (17)
- Romania (22)
- Russia (9)
- Serbia (1)
- Switzerland (1)
- Slovakia (4)
- Sweden (9)
- Turkmenistan (12)
- Tunisia (16)
- Turkey (44)
- Ukraine (32)
- United States (1)
