= 2016 World Wrestling Olympic Qualification Tournament 2 =

The 2016 World Wrestling Olympic Qualification Tournament 2 was the second of two worldwide qualification tournaments for the 2016 Olympics. Competitors at this tournament failed to qualify for the Olympics at the 2015 World Wrestling Championships, at their respective regional qualifier, or at the 2016 World Wrestling Olympic Qualification Tournament 1. The top two competitors in each weight class qualified.

It was held between 6–8 May 2016 in Istanbul, Turkey.

== Men's freestyle ==
=== 57 kg ===
8 May

Round of 32
Pedro Mejías (VEN)	6–0 Fall	James Mancini (ITA)
Uladzislau Andreyeu (BLR)	10–0	Kastriot Sedolli (KOS)
Filipe Esteves (BRA)	1–11	Samat Nadyrbek Uulu (KGZ)
John Pineda (CAN)	0–5	Vasyl Shuptar (UKR)
Levan Metreveli (ESP)	8–3	Zoheir El-Ouarraqe (FRA)

Round of 16
Anatolii Buruian (MDA)	0
Süleyman Atlı (TUR)	11
Randy Vock (SUI)	0
Krzysztof Bieńkowski (POL)	10
József Molnár (HUN)	10
Qi Mude (CHN)	0
Hikmatullo Vohidov (TJK)	8
Marcel Ewald (GER)	4
Abbos Rakhmonov (UZB)	7
Muhammad Bilal (PAK)	0
Yuriy Holub (ISR)	2
Pedro Mejías (VEN)	12
Uladzislau Andreyeu (BLR)	2
Samat Nadyrbek Uulu (KGZ)	7
Vasyl Shuptar (UKR)	9
Levan Metreveli (ESP)	0

Quarterfinals
Süleyman Atlı (TUR)	6
Krzysztof Bieńkowski (POL)	0
József Molnár (HUN)	5
Hikmatullo Vohidov (TJK)	8
Abbos Rakhmonov (UZB)	8
Pedro Mejías (VEN)	1
Samat Nadyrbek Uulu (KGZ)	9
Vasyl Shuptar (UKR)	3

Semifinals
Süleyman Atlı (TUR)	16
Hikmatullo Vohidov (TJK)	6
Abbos Rakhmonov (UZB)	2
Samat Nadyrbek Uulu (KGZ)	1

Final
Süleyman Atlı (TUR)	18
Abbos Rakhmonov (UZB)	12

Repechage round 2
Anatolii Buruian (MDA)
Krzysztof Bieńkowski (POL)	WO
Muhammad Bilal (PAK)	8
Pedro Mejías (VEN)	7

Bronze medals
Krzysztof Bieńkowski (POL)	4
Hikmatullo Vohidov (TJK)	2
Muhammad Bilal (PAK)	WO
Samat Nadyrbek Uulu (KGZ)

=== 65 kg ===
8 May

Round of 32
Bilal El-Ouarraqe (MAR)	10–0	Cristian Nicolescu (PLW)
Kevin Bonilla (HON)	0–10	Manuel Ortiz (ESP)
Norbert Lukács (HUN)	10–0	Lincoln Messias (BRA)
Elaman Dogdurbek Uulu (KGZ)	1–11	George Bucur (ROU)
Brandon Díaz (MEX)	0–10	Andrei Prepeliţă (MDA)
Nguyễn Xuân Định (VIE)	3–13	David Habat (SLO)
Haislan Garcia (CAN)	4–2	Sodiqkhoja Ismoilov (TJK)
Zaid Hilal (IRQ)	3–8	Mykola Bolotňuk (SVK)
Maximilian Ausserleitner (AUT)	2–5	Steven Graf (SUI)
Azamat Nurykau (BLR)	12–10	Lee Seung-chul (KOR)
Qamar Abbas (PAK)	0–10	Kevin Henkel (GER)
Semen Radulov (UKR)	1–3	Iurii Siemakin (FRA)
Abdulrahman Ibrahim (QAT)	0–10	Dauren Zhumagaziyev (KAZ)
Borislav Novachkov (BUL)	6–0	Dejan Mitrov (MKD)
Frank Molinaro (USA)	3–2	David Safaryan (ARM)
Yuhi Fujinami (JPN)	10–0	Saksit Janhom (THA)

Round of 16
Bilal El-Ouarraqe (MAR)	12
Manuel Ortiz (ESP)	2
Norbert Lukács (HUN)	2
George Bucur (ROU)	10
Andrei Prepeliţă (MDA)	0
David Habat (SLO)	10^{F}
Haislan Garcia (CAN)	11
Mykola Bolotňuk (SVK)	0
Steven Graf (SUI)	5
Azamat Nurykau (BLR)	16
Kevin Henkel (GER)	2
Iurii Siemakin (FRA)	12
Dauren Zhumagaziyev (KAZ)	2
Borislav Novachkov (BUL)	6
Frank Molinaro (USA)	7
Yuhi Fujinami (JPN)	6

Quarterfinals
Bilal El-Ouarraqe (MAR)	0
George Bucur (ROU)	10
David Habat (SLO)	4
Haislan Garcia (CAN)	6
Azamat Nurykau (BLR)	8
Iurii Siemakin (FRA)	1
Borislav Novachkov (BUL)	5
Frank Molinaro (USA)	2

Semifinals
George Bucur (ROU)	2
Haislan Garcia (CAN)	2
Azamat Nurykau (BLR)	4
Borislav Novachkov (BUL)	8

Final
Haislan Garcia (CAN)
Borislav Novachkov (BUL)	WO

Repechage round 1
Sodiqkhoja Ismoilov (TJK)	7^{F}
Mykola Bolotňuk (SVK)	0
Dejan Mitrov (MKD)
Dauren Zhumagaziyev (KAZ)	WO

Repechage round 2
Sodiqkhoja Ismoilov (TJK)	5
David Habat (SLO)	9
Dauren Zhumagaziyev (KAZ)	1
Frank Molinaro (USA)	4

Bronze medals
David Habat (SLO)	11
George Bucur (ROU)	7
Frank Molinaro (USA)	5
Azamat Nurykau (BLR)	2

- Following the disqualification of Andriy Kviatkovskyi at the European Qualification Tournament, his spot went to Zurabi Iakobishvili from Georgia. Borislav Novachkov earns the Olympic quota won by Georgia in Mongolia. Following this adjustment, as Novachkov takes his license from the 1st World Qualifier his quota transferred to Frank Molinaro.

=== 74 kg ===
8 May

Round of 32
Bekzod Abdurakhmonov (UZB)	4–0 Fall	Padipat Wantawong (THA)
Zhang Chongyao (CHN)	5–0	Yoan Blanco (ECU)
Amirkhan Visalimov (AUT)	11–0	Christian Anguiano (MEX)
Andrea Sorbello (ITA)	0–10	Dylan Palacio (URU)
Muhammad Asad Butt (PAK)	4–2 Fall	Cấn Tất Dự (VIE)
Grigor Grigoryan (ARM)	11–0	Andrei Karpach (BLR)
Mustafa Abdul-Basit (IRQ)	2–12	Taimuraz Friev (ESP)
Azamat Sufiev (TJK)	10–0	Nguon Makara (CAM)
Asnage Castelly (HAI)	4–15	Krystian Brzozowski (POL)
Pedro Soto (PUR)	0–10	Kim Dai-sung (KOR)
Cleopas Ncube (CAN)	10–0	Mihály Nagy (HUN)

Round of 16
Alexandros Samanidis (GRE)	4
Martin Obst (GER)	8
Giya Chykhladze (UKR)	6
Saiakbai Usupov (KGZ)	7
Alberts Jurčenko (LAT)	0
Bekzod Abdurakhmonov (UZB)	2^{F}
Zhang Chongyao (CHN)	2
Amirkhan Visalimov (AUT)	6^{F}
Dylan Palacio (URU)	16
Muhammad Asad Butt (PAK)	6
Grigor Grigoryan (ARM)	8
Taimuraz Friev (ESP)	18
Azamat Sufiev (TJK)	2
Krystian Brzozowski (POL)	7
Kim Dai-sung (KOR)	10
Cleopas Ncube (CAN)	7

Quarterfinals
Martin Obst (GER)	1
Saiakbai Usupov (KGZ)	11
Bekzod Abdurakhmonov (UZB)	12
Amirkhan Visalimov (AUT)	0
Dylan Palacio (URU)	0
Taimuraz Friev (ESP)	11
Krystian Brzozowski (POL)	1
Kim Dai-sung (KOR)	1

Semifinals
Saiakbai Usupov (KGZ)	2
Bekzod Abdurakhmonov (UZB)	12^{F}
Taimuraz Friev (ESP)	8^{F}
Krystian Brzozowski (POL)	3

Final
Bekzod Abdurakhmonov (UZB)	WO
Taimuraz Friev (ESP)

Repechage round 1
Padipat Wantawong (THA)	2
Alberts Jurčenko (LAT)	12
Mustafa Abdul-Basit (IRQ)	1
Grigor Grigoryan (ARM)	14

Repechage round 2
Alberts Jurčenko (LAT)	9
Amirkhan Visalimov (AUT)	4^{F}
Grigor Grigoryan (ARM)	11
Dylan Palacio (URU)	16

Bronze medals
Amirkhan Visalimov (AUT)	WO
Saiakbai Usupov (KGZ)
Dylan Palacio (URU)	2
Krystian Brzozowski (POL)	2

=== 86 kg ===
8 May

Round of 32
Umidjon Ismanov (UZB)	4–6	René Matejov (SVK)
Ibragim Aldatov (UKR)	3–2	Innokenti Innokentev (KGZ)
Adrian Jaoude (BRA)	10–0	Nathaniel Tuamoheloa (ASA)
Tamerlan Tagziev (CAN)	6–4	Timofei Xenidis (GRE)
Aron Caneva (ITA)	2–12	Muhammad Inam (PAK)
Akhmed Aibuev (FRA)	6–12	Pool Ambrocio (PER)
Kim Gwan-uk (KOR)	10–0	Bakhodur Kadirov (TJK)
Gopal Yadav (IND)	4–5	Armands Zvirbulis (LAT)
Halil Zubairov (MKD)	4–12	Gheorghiță Ștefan (ROU)
Ville Heino (FIN)	8–6	Boris Andonov (ESP)

Round of 16
Shinya Matsumoto (JPN)	13
Marco Riesen (SUI)	2
Piotr Ianulov (MDA)	1
Bi Shengfeng (CHN)	8
Musa Murtazaliev (ARM)	0
William Harth (GER)	4
René Matejov (SVK)	5
Ibragim Aldatov (UKR)	7
Adrian Jaoude (BRA)	0
Tamerlan Tagziev (CAN)	11
Muhammad Inam (PAK)	1
Pool Ambrocio (PER)	2
Kim Gwan-uk (KOR)	6
Armands Zvirbulis (LAT)	2
Gheorghiță Ștefan (ROU)	3
Ville Heino (FIN)	0

Quarterfinals
Shinya Matsumoto (JPN)	0
Bi Shengfeng (CHN)	10
William Harth (GER)	0
Ibragim Aldatov (UKR)	7
Tamerlan Tagziev (CAN)	4
Pool Ambrocio (PER)	5
Kim Gwan-uk (KOR)	10
Gheorghiță Ștefan (ROU)	0

Semifinals
Bi Shengfeng (CHN)	10
Ibragim Aldatov (UKR)	0
Pool Ambrocio (PER)	1
Kim Gwan-uk (KOR)	8

Final
Bi Shengfeng (CHN)	7^{F}
Kim Gwan-uk (KOR)	1

Repechage round 1
Bakhodur Kadirov (TJK)	6
Armands Zvirbulis (LAT)	7

Repechage round 2
Piotr Ianulov (MDA)	9
Shinya Matsumoto (JPN)	1
Armands Zvirbulis (LAT)	WO
Gheorghiță Ștefan (ROU)

Bronze medals
Piotr Ianulov (MDA)	WO
Ibragim Aldatov (UKR)
Armands Zvirbulis (LAT)	4
Pool Ambrocio (PER)	2

=== 97 kg ===
8 May

Round of 32
Jozef Jaloviar (SVK)	0–4 Fall	Egzon Shala (ALB)
Koki Yamamoto (JPN)	7–8 Fall	Paulo Victor Santos (BRA)
Albert Saritov (ROU)	8–0	Dragomir Stoychev (BUL)
Zhang Xueyi (CHN)	0–8	Kim Jae-gang (KOR)
Martin Erasmus (RSA)	1–12	Imants Lagodskis (LAT)
Magomedgaji Nurov (MKD)	4–1	Attila Szmik (HUN)
Ivan Yankouski (BLR)	10–0	Ragnar Kaasik (EST)
Christian Rodríguez (ESP)	5–10 Fall	Stefan Reichmuth (SUI)
Arjun Gill (CAN)	8–3	Tahar Lutfi (IRQ)

Round of 16
Johannes Ludescher (AUT)	0
Erik Thiele (GER)	6
Mausam Khatri (IND)	10
Nikolaos Papaoikonomou (GRE)	0
Edon Shala (KOS)	6
Dorjkhandyn Khüderbulga (MGL)	12
Rustam Iskandari (TJK)	11
Egzon Shala (ALB)	0
Paulo Victor Santos (BRA)	0
Albert Saritov (ROU)	10
Kim Jae-gang (KOR)	2
Imants Lagodskis (LAT)	1
Magomedgaji Nurov (MKD)	5
Ivan Yankouski (BLR)	8
Stefan Reichmuth (SUI)	1
Arjun Gill (CAN)	1

Quarterfinals
Erik Thiele (GER)	4
Mausam Khatri (IND)	8
Dorjkhandyn Khüderbulga (MGL)	11
Rustam Iskandari (TJK)	0
Albert Saritov (ROU)	6
Kim Jae-gang (KOR)	2
Ivan Yankouski (BLR)	10
Arjun Gill (CAN)	0

Semifinals
Mausam Khatri (IND)	6
Dorjkhandyn Khüderbulga (MGL)	8
Albert Saritov (ROU)	10
Ivan Yankouski (BLR)	0

Final
Dorjkhandyn Khüderbulga (MGL)	0
Albert Saritov (ROU)	4

Repechage round 1
Dragomir Stoychev (BUL)	9
Paulo Victor Santos (BRA)	0

Repechage round 2
Edon Shala (KOS)	3
Rustam Iskandari (TJK)	10^{F}
Dragomir Stoychev (BUL)	3
Kim Jae-gang (KOR)	1

Bronze medals
Rustam Iskandari (TJK)	8
Mausam Khatri (IND)	8
Dragomir Stoychev (BUL)	0
Ivan Yankouski (BLR)	11

=== 125 kg ===
8 May

Round of 32
Ioannis Arzoumanidis (GRE)	5–6	Nam Kyung-jin (KOR)
Lyuben Iliev (BUL)	10–0	Florian Skilang Temengil (PLW)
Oleksandr Khotsianivskyi (UKR)	7–2	Hitender Beniwal (IND)

Round of 16
Zaman Anwar (PAK)	0
Rareș Chintoan (ROU)	10
Ibrahim Saidau (BLR)	3
Nick Matuhin (GER)	1
Jesse Ruíz (MEX)	0
Andrei Romanov (MDA)	10
Luis Vivenes (VEN)	4
Aleksey Krupnyakov (KGZ)	11
Tetsuya Tanaka (JPN)	1
Jere Heino (FIN)	1
Khasanboy Rakhimov (UZB)	4
Antoine Jaoude (BRA)	1
Soslan Gaglojev (SVK)	6^{F}
Nam Kyung-jin (KOR)	0
Lyuben Iliev (BUL)	0
Oleksandr Khotsianivskyi (UKR)	10

Quarterfinals
Rareș Chintoan (ROU)	4
Ibrahim Saidau (BLR)	10
Andrei Romanov (MDA)	1
Aleksey Krupnyakov (KGZ)	2
Jere Heino (FIN)	9
Khasanboy Rakhimov (UZB)	5
Soslan Gaglojev (SVK)	4
Oleksandr Khotsianivskyi (UKR)	14

Semifinals
Ibrahim Saidau (BLR)	10
Aleksey Krupnyakov (KGZ)	6
Jere Heino (FIN)	0
Oleksandr Khotsianivskyi (UKR)	10

Final
Ibrahim Saidau (BLR)	0^{R}
Oleksandr Khotsianivskyi (UKR)	4

Repechage round 1
Hitender Beniwal (IND)	4^{F}
Lyuben Iliev (BUL)	0

Repechage round 2
Nick Matuhin (GER)
Rareș Chintoan (ROU)	WO
Hitender Beniwal (IND)	5
Soslan Gaglojev (SVK)	0

Bronze medals
Rareș Chintoan (ROU)	4^{F}
Aleksey Krupnyakov (KGZ)	0
Hitender Beniwal (IND)	4^{F}
Jere Heino (FIN)	0

== Men's Greco-Roman ==
=== 59 kg ===
6 May

Round of 32
Donior Islamov (MDA)	8–5	Ali Soto (MEX)
Dawid Ersetic (POL)	8–0	Ritisak Pravan (THA)
Jani Haapamäki (FIN)	4–0	Diego Romanelli (BRA)
Roman Amoyan (ARM)	4–4	Rahman Bilici (TUR)
Frunze Harutyunyan (SWE)	5–2	Ivo Angelov (BUL)
Albert Baghumyan (ESP)	0–3	Virgil Munteanu (ROU)
Revaz Lashkhi (GEO)	8–0	Ravinder Singh (IND)
Jesse Thielke (USA)	8–0	Péter Módos (HUN)

Round of 16
Federico Manea (ITA)	0
Andrey Tsaryuk (ISR)	9
Dmytro Tsymbaliuk (UKR)	7
Steven Takahashi (CAN)	2
Hamid Sourian (IRI)	9
Ivan Lizatović (CRO)	0
Apostolos Manouilidis (GRE)	0
Erik Weiß (GER)	3
Donior Islamov (MDA)	11
Dawid Ersetic (POL)	0
Jani Haapamäki (FIN)	0
Rahman Bilici (TUR)	4^{F}
Frunze Harutyunyan (SWE)	8
Virgil Munteanu (ROU)	0
Revaz Lashkhi (GEO)	6
Jesse Thielke (USA)	13

Quarterfinals
Andrey Tsaryuk (ISR)	2
Dmytro Tsymbaliuk (UKR)	8^{F}
Hamid Sourian (IRI)	8
Erik Weiß (GER)	0
Donior Islamov (MDA)	4
Rahman Bilici (TUR)	4
Frunze Harutyunyan (SWE)	4
Jesse Thielke (USA)	7^{F}

Semifinals
Dmytro Tsymbaliuk (UKR)	0
Hamid Sourian (IRI)	8
Donior Islamov (MDA)	8
Jesse Thielke (USA)	17

Final
Hamid Sourian (IRI)	8
Jesse Thielke (USA)	0

Repechage round 1
Péter Módos (HUN)	0
Revaz Lashkhi (GEO)	4

Repechage round 2
Ivan Lizatović (CRO)	6
Erik Weiß (GER)	0
Revaz Lashkhi (GEO)	5
Frunze Harutyunyan (SWE)	6

Bronze medals
Ivan Lizatović (CRO)	1
Dmytro Tsymbaliuk (UKR)	4
Frunze Harutyunyan (SWE)	0
Donior Islamov (MDA)	5

=== 66 kg ===
6 May

Round of 32
Daniel Cataraga (MDA)	11–6	Konstantin Stas (BUL)
Jair Cuero (COL)	0–11	Ruslan Tsarev (KGZ)
Armen Vardanyan (UKR)	2–0 Fall	Ņikita Masjuks (LAT)
RaVaughn Perkins (USA)	11–2	Zheng Pan (CHN)
Vladimiros Matias (GRE)	8–2 Fall	Jefrin Mejía (HON)
Benedikt Puffer (AUT)	0–5	Dawid Kareciński (POL)
Bilal El-Bahja (MAR)	0–8	Zakarias Tallroth (SWE)
Dominik Etlinger (CRO)	0–4 Fall	Rasul Chunayev (AZE)
Pavel Liakh (BLR)	8–0	Aram Vardanyan (UZB)
Lukas Thomas (NAM)	0–8	Azizbeki Sharifzoda (TJK)
Magomed Chuhalov (KAZ)	7–1	Nicolas Christen (SUI)
Suresh Yadav (IND)	0–3	Artak Margaryan (FRA)
Matouš Morbitzer (CZE)	0–6	Ismael Navarro (ESP)

Round of 16
Fredrik Bjerrehuus (DEN)	3
Marius Thommesen (NOR)	0
Yunus Özel (TUR)	2
Daniel Cataraga (MDA)	4
Ruslan Tsarev (KGZ)	8
Armen Vardanyan (UKR)	1
RaVaughn Perkins (USA)	9
Vladimiros Matias (GRE)	4
Dawid Kareciński (POL)	6
Zakarias Tallroth (SWE)	3
Rasul Chunayev (AZE)	9
Pavel Liakh (BLR)	7
Azizbeki Sharifzoda (TJK)	0
Magomed Chuhalov (KAZ)	8
Artak Margaryan (FRA)	6
Ismael Navarro (ESP)	0

Quarterfinals
Fredrik Bjerrehuus (DEN)	0
Daniel Cataraga (MDA)	9
Ruslan Tsarev (KGZ)	4
RaVaughn Perkins (USA)	3
Dawid Kareciński (POL)	1
Rasul Chunayev (AZE)	6
Magomed Chuhalov (KAZ)	2
Artak Margaryan (FRA)	4

Semifinals
Daniel Cataraga (MDA)	0
Ruslan Tsarev (KGZ)	10
Rasul Chunayev (AZE)	8
Artak Margaryan (FRA)	0

Final
Ruslan Tsarev (KGZ)	0
Rasul Chunayev (AZE)	6

Repechage round 1
Jair Cuero (COL)	0
Armen Vardanyan (UKR)	9
Dominik Etlinger (CRO)
Pavel Liakh (BLR)	WO

Repechage round 2
Armen Vardanyan (UKR)	8
RaVaughn Perkins (USA)	0
Pavel Liakh (BLR)	0
Dawid Kareciński (POL)	7

Bronze medals
Armen Vardanyan (UKR)	6
Daniel Cataraga (MDA)	5
Dawid Kareciński (POL)	WO
Artak Margaryan (FRA)

=== 75 kg ===
6 May

Round of 32
Oldřich Varga (CZE)	5–0	Georgios Prevolarakis (GRE)
Dmytro Pyshkov (UKR)	6–4	Luis Avendaño (VEN)
Kazbek Kilou (BLR)	8–0	Evrik Nikoghosyan (FRA)
Robert Rosengren (SWE)	7–2	Daniar Kobonov (KGZ)
Vojtech Jakus (SVK)	0–4	Florian Marchl (AUT)
Veli-Karri Suominen (FIN)	4–0	Tsukasa Tsurumaki (JPN)
Edgar Babayan (POL)	6–2	Igor Beşleaga (MDA)
Sukhrob Abdulkhaev (TJK)	3–3	Akrem Boudjemline (ALG)
Aleksandr Kazakevič (LTU)	5–14	Jure Kuhar (SLO)
Bakhit Sharif Badr (QAT)	0–8	Selçuk Çebi (TUR)
Ilie Cojocari (ROU)	0–8	Pascal Eisele (GER)
Božo Starčević (CRO)	8–0	Rabbia Khalil (PLE)
Ângelo Moreira (BRA)	4–12	Ciro Russo (ITA)

Round of 16
Daniel Aleksandrov (BUL)	10
Juan Ángel Escobar (MEX)	0
Jonas Bossert (SUI)	8
Oldřich Varga (CZE)	0
Dmytro Pyshkov (UKR)	2
Kazbek Kilou (BLR)	7
Robert Rosengren (SWE)	10
Florian Marchl (AUT)	0
Veli-Karri Suominen (FIN)	0
Edgar Babayan (POL)	5
Akrem Boudjemline (ALG)	0
Jure Kuhar (SLO)	8
Selçuk Çebi (TUR)	3
Pascal Eisele (GER)	0
Božo Starčević (CRO)	9
Ciro Russo (ITA)	0

Quarterfinals
Daniel Aleksandrov (BUL)	9
Jonas Bossert (SUI)	6
Kazbek Kilou (BLR)	2
Robert Rosengren (SWE)	4
Edgar Babayan (POL)	0
Jure Kuhar (SLO)	5
Selçuk Çebi (TUR)	3
Božo Starčević (CRO)	0

Semifinals
Daniel Aleksandrov (BUL)	7
Robert Rosengren (SWE)	4
Jure Kuhar (SLO)	0
Selçuk Çebi (TUR)	2

Final
Daniel Aleksandrov (BUL)
Selçuk Çebi (TUR)	WO

Repechage round 1
Bakhit Sharif Badr (QAT)	WO
Pascal Eisele (GER)

Repechage round 2
Juan Ángel Escobar (MEX)	4
Jonas Bossert (SUI)	10
Bakhit Sharif Badr (QAT)	0
Božo Starčević (CRO)	8

Bronze medals
Jonas Bossert (SUI)	0
Robert Rosengren (SWE)	4
Božo Starčević (CRO)	5
Jure Kuhar (SLO)	4

=== 85 kg ===
6 May

Round of 32
Mélonin Noumonvi (FRA)	4–2	Dorin Pârvan (ROU)
Fabio Parisi (ITA)	0–2	Denis Kudla (GER)
Trần Văn Tuấn (VIE)	0–8	Amer Hrustanović (AUT)
Artur Omarov (CZE)	8–0	Pedro García (ESP)
Yorgen Cova (VEN)	4–10	Nenad Žugaj (CRO)
Masato Sumi (JPN)	0–1	Metehan Başar (TUR)
Petar Balo (SRB)	0–8	Eerik Aps (EST)
Skander Missaoui (TUN)	0–8	Tadeusz Michalik (POL)

Round of 16
Jon Isaksen (NOR)	1
Dimitrios Tsekeridis (GRE)	7
Daniyal Gadzhiyev (KAZ)	9
Park Jin-sung (KOR)	0
Roberti Kobliashvili (GEO)	8
Ronisson Brandão (BRA)	0
Laimutis Adomaitis (LTU)	10
Ravinder Khatri (IND)	6
Mélonin Noumonvi (FRA)	0
Denis Kudla (GER)	2
Amer Hrustanović (AUT)	1
Artur Omarov (CZE)	2
Nenad Žugaj (CRO)	0
Metehan Başar (TUR)	3
Eerik Aps (EST)	1
Tadeusz Michalik (POL)	2

Quarterfinals
Dimitrios Tsekeridis (GRE)	7
Daniyal Gadzhiyev (KAZ)	10
Roberti Kobliashvili (GEO)	4
Laimutis Adomaitis (LTU)	1
Denis Kudla (GER)	2
Artur Omarov (CZE)	1
Metehan Başar (TUR)	6
Tadeusz Michalik (POL)	0

Semifinals
Daniyal Gadzhiyev (KAZ)	1
Roberti Kobliashvili (GEO)	2
Denis Kudla (GER)	2
Metehan Başar (TUR)	1

Final
Roberti Kobliashvili (GEO)
Denis Kudla (GER)	WO

Repechage round 1
Fabio Parisi (ITA)	WO
Mélonin Noumonvi (FRA)

Repechage round 2
Ronisson Brandão (BRA)	0
Laimutis Adomaitis (LTU)	8
Fabio Parisi (ITA)
Artur Omarov (CZE)	WO

Bronze medals
Laimutis Adomaitis (LTU)	WO
Daniyal Gadzhiyev (KAZ)
Artur Omarov (CZE)	0
Metehan Başar (TUR)	2

=== 98 kg ===
6 May

Round of 32
Norikatsu Saikawa (JPN)	0–3	Felix Baldauf (NOR)
Mohamed Abdelfatah (BRN)	WO	Robert Avanesyan (ISR)
Joe Rau (USA)	9–0	Narek Setaghyan (ESP)
Kevin Mejía (HON)	9–0	Tuomas Lahti (FIN)
Daigoro Timoncini (ITA)	7–2	Yerulan Iskakov (KAZ)
Kim Seung-jun (KOR)	4–4	Vilius Laurinaitis (LTU)

Round of 16
Davi Albino (BRA)	2
Oliver Hassler (GER)	6
David Vála (CZE)	1
Radosław Grzybicki (POL)	1
Abror Mamasoliev (UZB)	0
Cenk İldem (TUR)	7
Georgios Koutsioumpas (GRE)	4^{F}
Beksultan Makhmudov (KGZ)	6
Daniel Gastl (AUT)	0
Shalva Gadabadze (AZE)	2
Felix Baldauf (NOR)	9
Robert Avanesyan (ISR)	0
Joe Rau (USA)	0
Kevin Mejía (HON)	8
Daigoro Timoncini (ITA)	3
Kim Seung-jun (KOR)	1

Quarterfinals
Oliver Hassler (GER)	4
Radosław Grzybicki (POL)	1
Cenk İldem (TUR)	3
Georgios Koutsioumpas (GRE)	0
Shalva Gadabadze (AZE)	2
Felix Baldauf (NOR)	12^{F}
Kevin Mejía (HON)	4
Daigoro Timoncini (ITA)	4^{F}

Semifinals
Oliver Hassler (GER)	2
Cenk İldem (TUR)	4
Felix Baldauf (NOR)	1
Daigoro Timoncini (ITA)	2

Final
Cenk İldem (TUR)	WO
Daigoro Timoncini (ITA)

Repechage round 1
Yerulan Iskakov (KAZ)	2
Kim Seung-jun (KOR)	0

Repechage round 2
Abror Mamasoliev (UZB)	WO
Georgios Koutsioumpas (GRE)
Yerulan Iskakov (KAZ)
Kevin Mejía (HON)	WO

Bronze medals
Abror Mamasoliev (UZB)	0
Oliver Hassler (GER)	4
Kevin Mejía (HON)	0
Felix Baldauf (NOR)	4^{F}

=== 130 kg ===
6 May

Round of 32
Xenofon Koutsioumpas (GRE)	8–0	Nemanja Pavlović (SRB)

Round of 16
Naveen Sevlia (IND)	0
Miloslav Metodiev (BUL)	9
Łukasz Banak (POL)	6
Lukas Hörmann (AUT)	0
Kim Yong-min (KOR)	0
Johan Eurén (SWE)	1
Stjepan Lavrić (CRO)	1
Ioseb Chugoshvili (BLR)	6
Mantas Knystautas (LTU)	0
Mihály Deák-Bárdos (HUN)	1
Luciano del Río (ARG)	0
Arata Sonoda (JPN)	9
Radhouane Chebbi (TUN)	8
Edgardo López (PUR)	0
Iakobi Kajaia (GEO)	8
Xenofon Koutsioumpas (GRE)	0

Quarterfinals
Miloslav Metodiev (BUL)	4
Łukasz Banak (POL)	1
Johan Eurén (SWE)	3
Ioseb Chugoshvili (BLR)	3
Mihály Deák-Bárdos (HUN)	3
Arata Sonoda (JPN)	2
Radhouane Chebbi (TUN)	0
Iakobi Kajaia (GEO)	8

Semifinals
Miloslav Metodiev (BUL)	1
Johan Eurén (SWE)	4
Mihály Deák-Bárdos (HUN)	0
Iakobi Kajaia (GEO)	9

Final
Johan Eurén (SWE)	WO
Iakobi Kajaia (GEO)

Repechage round 2
Kim Yong-min (KOR)	0
Ioseb Chugoshvili (BLR)	9
Xenofon Koutsioumpas (GRE)
Radhouane Chebbi (TUN)	WO

Bronze medals
Ioseb Chugoshvili (BLR)	3
Miloslav Metodiev (BUL)	4
Radhouane Chebbi (TUN)	WO
Mihály Deák-Bárdos (HUN)

== Women's freestyle ==
=== 48 kg ===
7 May

Round of 32
Liliana Santos (POR)	3–4	Evin Demirhan (TUR)
Jaqueline Schellin (GER)	6–0 Fall	Silvia Felice (ITA)
Vinesh Phogat (IND)	10–0	Nataliya Pulkovska (UKR)
Julie Sabatié (FRA)	14–6	Yana Rattigan (GBR)
Eugenia Bustabad (ESP)	0–10	Lee Yu-mi (KOR)
Laura Peredo (MEX)	10–0	Wasana Junnoi (THA)

Round of 16
Sarianne Savola (FIN)	2
Erdenesükhiin Narangerel (MGL)	10^{F}
Dauletbike Yakhshimuratova (UZB)	4
Susana Almeida (BRA)	0
Thalía Mallqui (PER)	0
Vanesa Kaladzinskaya (BLR)	6
Iwona Matkowska (POL)	10
Silje Kippernes (NOR)	0
Karalina Tjapko (LAT)	4
Fredrika Petersson (SWE)	6
Evin Demirhan (TUR)	6^{F}
Jaqueline Schellin (GER)	1
Vinesh Phogat (IND)	11
Julie Sabatié (FRA)	0
Lee Yu-mi (KOR)	6
Laura Peredo (MEX)	2

Quarterfinals
Erdenesükhiin Narangerel (MGL)	4^{F}
Dauletbike Yakhshimuratova (UZB)	0
Vanesa Kaladzinskaya (BLR)	1
Iwona Matkowska (POL)	10
Fredrika Petersson (SWE)	3
Evin Demirhan (TUR)	6
Vinesh Phogat (IND)	11
Lee Yu-mi (KOR)	1

Semifinals
Erdenesükhiin Narangerel (MGL)	2
Iwona Matkowska (POL)	12
Evin Demirhan (TUR)	2
Vinesh Phogat (IND)	12

Final
Iwona Matkowska (POL)	0
Vinesh Phogat (IND)	6

Repechage round 1
Nataliya Pulkovska (UKR)	3
Julie Sabatié (FRA)	1

Repechage round 2
Silje Kippernes (NOR)	0
Vanesa Kaladzinskaya (BLR)	11
Nataliya Pulkovska (UKR)	11
Lee Yu-mi (KOR)	6

Bronze medals
Vanesa Kaladzinskaya (BLR)	6
Erdenesükhiin Narangerel (MGL)	9
Nataliya Pulkovska (UKR)	0
Evin Demirhan (TUR)	12

=== 53 kg ===
7 May

Round of 32
Chov Sotheara (CAM)	1–12	Alma Valencia (MEX)
Evelina Nikolova (BUL)	8–2	Bermet Nurlanbek Kyzy (KGZ)
Tiina Ylinen (FIN)	4–5	Karima Sánchez (ESP)
Irina Ologonova (RUS)	11–0	Giullia Penalber (BRA)
Nadzeya Shushko (BLR)	10-0	Orasa Sookdongyor (THA)
Lalita Sehrawat (IND)	2–4	Natalia Budu (MDA)
Lenka Hocková (CZE)	0–7	Tatyana Amanzhol (KAZ)
Yuliya Khavaldzhy (UKR)	5–0 Fall	Maroi Mezien (TUN)

Round of 16
Simona Pricop (ROU)	13^{F}
Lee Shin-hye (KOR)	2
Francesca Mori (ITA)	1
Mélanie Lesaffre (FRA)	2
Chiu Hsin-ju (TPE)	0
Bediha Gün (TUR)	8^{F}
Shakhodat Djullibaeva (UZB)	6
Mercédesz Dénes (HUN)	8
Alma Valencia (MEX)	2^{F}
Evelina Nikolova (BUL)	0
Karima Sánchez (ESP)	2
Irina Ologonova (RUS)	10^{F}
Nadzeya Shushko (BLR)	10
Natalia Budu (MDA)	3
Tatyana Amanzhol (KAZ)	6
Yuliya Khavaldzhy (UKR)	10

Quarterfinals
Simona Pricop (ROU)	2
Mélanie Lesaffre (FRA)	4
Bediha Gün (TUR)	7
Mercédesz Dénes (HUN)	0
Alma Valencia (MEX)	5
Irina Ologonova (RUS)	3
Nadzeya Shushko (BLR)	5
Yuliya Khavaldzhy (UKR)	8^{F}

Semifinals
Mélanie Lesaffre (FRA)	2
Bediha Gün (TUR)	5^{F}
Alma Valencia (MEX)	0
Yuliya Khavaldzhy (UKR)	4^{F}

Final
Bediha Gün (TUR)	4
Yuliya Khavaldzhy (UKR)	10

Repechage round 1
Maroi Mezien (TUN)	0
Tatyana Amanzhol (KAZ)	11^{F}

Repechage round 2
Chiu Hsin-ju (TPE)	2
Mercédesz Dénes (HUN)	12
Tatyana Amanzhol (KAZ)	10
Nadzeya Shushko (BLR)	0

Bronze medals
Mercédesz Dénes (HUN)	2
Mélanie Lesaffre (FRA)	3
Tatyana Amanzhol (KAZ)	5
Alma Valencia (MEX)	9

=== 58 kg ===
7 May

Round of 32
Kiều Thị Ly (VIE)	0–8 Fall	Kelsey Campbell (USA)
Mariana Cherdivara (MDA)	2–4	Tetyana Kit (UKR)
Roksana Zasina (POL)	1–3	Virginia Jiménez (VEN)
Anastasiya Huchok (BLR)	3–0	Alejandra Romero (MEX)
Aurélie Basset (FRA)	2–0	Salomat Kuchimova (UZB)

Round of 16
Irene García (ESP)	0
Sakshi Malik (IND)	10
Carola Rainero (ITA)	3
Kateryna Zhydachevska (ROU)	3
Grace Bullen (NOR)	10
Choi Ji-ae (KOR)	0
Emese Barka (HUN)	3
Zhang Lan (CHN)	8
Valeria Koblova (RUS)	10
Aiyim Abdildina (KAZ)	0
Yanet Sovero (PER)	2
Kelsey Campbell (USA)	4
Tetyana Kit (UKR)	12
Virginia Jiménez (VEN)	5
Anastasiya Huchok (BLR)	6
Aurélie Basset (FRA)	1

Quarterfinals
Sakshi Malik (IND)	12
Kateryna Zhydachevska (ROU)	2
Grace Bullen (NOR)	4
Zhang Lan (CHN)	12
Valeria Koblova (RUS)	4
Kelsey Campbell (USA)	1
Tetyana Kit (UKR)	4
Anastasiya Huchok (BLR)	4^{R}

Semifinals
Sakshi Malik (IND)	10
Zhang Lan (CHN)	10
Valeria Koblova (RUS)	10
Tetyana Kit (UKR)	2

Final
Sakshi Malik (IND)	3
Valeria Koblova (RUS)	7

Repechage round 2
Irene García (ESP)	4
Kateryna Zhydachevska (ROU)	6
Aiyim Abdildina (KAZ)	1
Kelsey Campbell (USA)	1

Bronze medals
Kateryna Zhydachevska (ROU)	6
Zhang Lan (CHN)	2
Kelsey Campbell (USA)	3
Tetyana Kit (UKR)	4

=== 63 kg ===
7 May

Round of 32
Shilpi Sheoran (IND)	6–2	Chloe Spiteri (GBR)
Indrė Bubelytė (LTU)	2–13 Fall	Leidy Izquierdo (COL)
Phạm Thị Loan (VIE)	0–2 Fall	Tayla Ford (NZL)

Round of 16
Seo Hee-jeong (KOR)	0
Koumba Larroque (FRA)	3^{F}
Nadia Antar (EGY)	7
Khalbazar Narbaeva (UZB)	14
Elis Manolova (AZE)	0
Monika Michalik (POL)	4
Kriszta Incze (ROU)	6
Nadine Weinauge (GER)	1
Adéla Hanzlíčková (CZE)	2
Aurora Fajardo (ESP)	0^{R}
Nathaly Grimán (VEN)	10
Stevie Kelly (AUS)	0
Henna Johansson (SWE)	4^{F}
Shilpi Sheoran (IND)	2
Leidy Izquierdo (COL)	3
Tayla Ford (NZL)	2

Quarterfinals
Koumba Larroque (FRA)	10
Khalbazar Narbaeva (UZB)	0
Monika Michalik (POL)	9
Kriszta Incze (ROU)	1
Adéla Hanzlíčková (CZE)	6
Nathaly Grimán (VEN)	13
Henna Johansson (SWE)	5
Leidy Izquierdo (COL)	0

Semifinals
Koumba Larroque (FRA)	1
Monika Michalik (POL)	3
Nathaly Grimán (VEN)	4
Henna Johansson (SWE)	4^{F}

Final
Monika Michalik (POL)	5
Henna Johansson (SWE)	2

Repechage round 2
Elis Manolova (AZE)	1
Kriszta Incze (ROU)	11
Shilpi Sheoran (IND)	4^{F}
Leidy Izquierdo (COL)	6

Bronze medals
Kriszta Incze (ROU)	0
Koumba Larroque (FRA)	9^{F}
Shilpi Sheoran (IND)	0
Nathaly Grimán (VEN)	10

=== 69 kg ===
7 May

Round of 16
Vanessa Wilson (HUN)	4
Diana Miranda (MEX)	0
Viktoria Bobeva (BUL)	3
Signe Marie Store (NOR)	4
Park Chae-rin (KOR)	6^{F}
Ana María García (ESP)	2
Danutė Domikaitytė (LTU)	6^{F}
Dimitra Christodoulaki (GRE)	0
Adina Popescu (ROU)	6
Laura Skujiņa (LAT)	2
Martina Kuenz (AUT)	4
Dalma Caneva (ITA)	5
Alina Stadnyk (UKR)	12
Yauheniya Andreichykava (BLR)	1
Tamyra Mensah (USA)	5
Geetika Jakhar (IND)	0

Quarterfinals
Vanessa Wilson (HUN)	1
Signe Marie Store (NOR)	2^{F}
Park Chae-rin (KOR)	0
Danutė Domikaitytė (LTU)	6^{F}
Adina Popescu (ROU)	6
Dalma Caneva (ITA)	3
Alina Stadnyk (UKR)	2^{F}
Tamyra Mensah (USA)	6

Semifinals
Signe Marie Store (NOR)	4
Danutė Domikaitytė (LTU)	3
Adina Popescu (ROU)	0
Alina Stadnyk (UKR)	9^{F}

Final
Signe Marie Store (NOR)
Alina Stadnyk (UKR)	WO

Repechage round 1
Viktoria Bobeva (BUL)	WO
Vanessa Wilson (HUN)
Yauheniya Andreichykava (BLR)	0
Tamyra Mensah (USA)	10

Bronze medals
Viktoria Bobeva (BUL)	4
Danutė Domikaitytė (LTU)	1
Tamyra Mensah (USA)	4^{F}
Adina Popescu (ROU)	0

=== 75 kg ===
7 May

Round of 16
Iselin Moen Solheim (NOR)	2
Maria Selmaier (GER)	7
Kiran Bishnoi (IND)	0
Gozal Zutova (AZE)	2^{F}
Ochirbatyn Burmaa (MGL)	2
Daria Osocka (POL)	0
Lalakhan Orinbaeva (UZB)	0
Svetlana Saenko (MDA)	4^{F}
Chang Hui-tsz (TPE)	8
Gabriela Peycheva (BUL)	5
Maider Unda (ESP)	0
Ekaterina Bukina (RUS)	10
Fanny Gradin (SWE)	3^{F}
Hwang Eun-ju (KOR)	4

Quarterfinals
Dayanara Rivera (PUR)	0
Maria Selmaier (GER)	10
Gozal Zutova (AZE)	4^{F}
Ochirbatyn Burmaa (MGL)	0
Svetlana Saenko (MDA)	10
Chang Hui-tsz (TPE)	0
Ekaterina Bukina (RUS)	8
Fanny Gradin (SWE)	2

Semifinals
Maria Selmaier (GER)	12
Gozal Zutova (AZE)	5
Svetlana Saenko (MDA)	0
Ekaterina Bukina (RUS)	10

Final
Maria Selmaier (GER)	2
Ekaterina Bukina (RUS)	6

Repechage round 1
Iselin Moen Solheim (NOR)	4^{F}
Dayanara Rivera (PUR)	2
Maider Unda (ESP)	6
Fanny Gradin (SWE)	9^{F}

Bronze medals
Iselin Moen Solheim (NOR)	0
Gozal Zutova (AZE)	8
Fanny Gradin (SWE)	WO
Svetlana Saenko (MDA)
