= 2020 European Wrestling Championships – Women's freestyle 76 kg =

Competition at the 2020 European Wrestling Championships

The women's freestyle 76 kg is a competition featured at the 2020 European Wrestling Championships, and was held in Rome, Italy on February 12 and February 13.

== Medalists ==
Gold	Ekaterina Bukina; Russia
Silver	Yasemin Adar; Turkey
Bronze	Aline Rotter-Focken; Germany
Bronze	Iselin Moen Solheim; Norway

== Results ==
Legend

- F — Won by fall

=== Final ===
Final
Yasemin Adar (TUR)	3
Ekaterina Bukina (RUS)	4

=== Top half ===
Round of 32

Round of 16
Kamila Kulwicka (POL)	10
Georgina Nelthorpe (GBR)	0
Yasemin Adar (TUR)	5
Aline Rotter-Focken (GER)	4
Mariya Oryashkova (BUL)	10
Eleni Pjollaj (ITA)	11
Pauline Lecarpentier (FRA)	7
Kamilė Gaučaitė (LTU)	1

Quarterfinals
Kamila Kulwicka (POL)	0
Yasemin Adar (TUR)	12^{F}
Eleni Pjollaj (ITA)	4
Pauline Lecarpentier (FRA)	9

Semifinals
Yasemin Adar (TUR)	10
Pauline Lecarpentier (FRA)	0

=== Bottom half ===
Round of 32
Svetlana Saenko (MDA)	0
Ekaterina Bukina (RUS)	10

Round of 16
Vasilisa Marzaliuk (BLR)	4
Martina Kuenz (AUT)	4
Zsanett Németh (HUN)	6
Alla Belinska (UKR)	10
Sabira Aliyeva (AZE)	6
Aikaterini Pitsiava (GRE)	0
Iselin Moen Solheim (NOR)	0
Ekaterina Bukina (RUS)	6

Quarterfinals
Vasilisa Marzaliuk (BLR)	3
Alla Belinska (UKR)	2
Sabira Aliyeva (AZE)	0
Ekaterina Bukina (RUS)	4^{F}

Semifinals
Vasilisa Marzaliuk (BLR)	5
Ekaterina Bukina (RUS)	5

Repechage round 1
Svetlana Saenko (MDA)	1
Iselin Moen Solheim (NOR)	6^{F}

Repechage round 2
Aline Rotter-Focken (GER)	10
Kamila Kulwicka (POL)	0
Iselin Moen Solheim (NOR)	6^{F}
Sabira Aliyeva (AZE)	4

Bronze medal match
Aline Rotter-Focken (GER)	10
Pauline Lecarpentier (FRA)	0
Iselin Moen Solheim (NOR)	6
Vasilisa Marzaliuk (BLR)	6

== Final standing ==
Rank	Athlete
1st place, gold medalist(s)	Ekaterina Bukina (RUS)
2nd place, silver medalist(s)	Yasemin Adar (TUR)
3rd place, bronze medalist(s)	Aline Rotter-Focken (GER)
3rd place, bronze medalist(s)	Iselin Moen Solheim (NOR)
5	Pauline Lecarpentier (FRA)
5	Vasilisa Marzaliuk (BLR)
7	Kamila Kulwicka (POL)
8	Eleni Pjollaj (ITA)
9	Alla Belinska (UKR)
10	Sabira Aliyeva (AZE)
11	Mariya Oryashkova (BUL)
12	Zsanett Németh (HUN)
13	Martina Kuenz (AUT)
14	Kamilė Gaučaitė (LTU)
15	Svetlana Saenko (MDA)
16	Aikaterini Pitsiava (GRE)
17	Georgina Nelthorpe (GBR)
