= 2014 European Wrestling Championships – Women's freestyle 75 kg =

Wrestling competitions

The women's freestyle 75 kg is a competition featured at the 2014 European Wrestling Championships, and was held in Vantaa, Finland on 1 April 2014.

== Medalists ==
Gold	Stanka Zlateva; Bulgaria
Silver	Vasilisa Marzaliuk; Belarus
Bronze	Kateryna Burmistrova; Ukraine
Bronze	Ekaterina Bukina; Russia

== Results ==
Legend

- F — Won by fall

=== Bracket ===
Round of 16
Vasilisa Marzaliuk (BLR)	11^{F}
Zsanett Németh (HUN)	0
Epp Mäe (EST)	4
Maria Selmaier (GER)	5
Ekaterina Bukina (RUS)	12
Patrycja Howis (POL)	2

Quarterfinals
Stanka Zlateva (BUL)	9^{F}
Ileana Macovei (ROU)	0
Marina Gastl (AUT)	0
Kateryna Burmistrova (UKR)	10
Yasemin Adar (TUR)	4
Vasilisa Marzaliuk (BLR)	8
Maria Selmaier (GER)	0
Ekaterina Bukina (RUS)	11

Semifinals
Stanka Zlateva (BUL)	3
Kateryna Burmistrova (UKR)	1
Vasilisa Marzaliuk (BLR)	10
Ekaterina Bukina (RUS)	0

Final
Stanka Zlateva (BUL)	4
Vasilisa Marzaliuk (BLR)	2

=== Repechage ===
Repechage round 1
Zsanett Németh (HUN)	5^{F}
Yasemin Adar (TUR)	0

Bronze medal match
Ileana Macovei (ROU)	0
Kateryna Burmistrova (UKR)	11
Zsanett Németh (HUN)	0
Ekaterina Bukina (RUS)	7
