= 2016 European Wrestling Championships – Women's freestyle 75 kg =

The women's freestyle 75 kg is a competition featured at the 2016 European Wrestling Championships, and was held in Riga, Latvia on March 10.

== Medalists ==
Gold	Yasemin Adar; Turkey
Silver	Alena Storodubtseva; Russia
Bronze	Vasilisa Marzaliuk; Belarus
Bronze	Alla Cherkasova; Ukraine

== Results ==
Legend

- F — Won by fall

=== Top half ===
Round of 16
Elena Frant Mudgar (ROM)	0
Maria Selmaier (GER)	7^{F}
Yasemin Adar (TUR)	10^{F}
Epp Mäe (EST)	1
Zsanett Németh (HUN)	2
Alla Cherkasova (UKR)	4^{F}

Quarterfinals
Alena Storodubtseva (RUS)	10
Svetlana Saenko (MDA)	0
Vasilisa Marzaliuk (BLR)	5^{F}
Lisa-Marie Neumaier (AUT)	0
Daria Urszula Osocka (POL)	5
Maria Selmaier (GER)	3
Yasemin Adar (TUR)	14^{F}
Alla Cherkasova (UKR)	12

Semifinals
Alena Storodubtseva (RUS)	8
Vasilisa Marzaliuk (BLR)	5
Daria Urszula Osocka (POL)	0
Yasemin Adar (TUR)	10

Final
Alena Storodubtseva (RUS)	0
Yasemin Adar (TUR)	7

=== Repechage ===
Repechage round 2
Epp Mäe (EST)	5
Alla Cherkasova (UKR)	6

Bronze medals
Svetlana Saenko (MDA)	0
Vasilisa Marzaliuk (BLR)	5
Alla Cherkasova (UKR)	10
Daria Urszula Osocka (POL)	0
