= 2012 World Wrestling Championships – Women's freestyle 72 kg =

Woman's Wrestling Championship

Women's freestyle 72 kg at the 2012 World Championships
- Venue: Millennium Place
- Dates: 28 September 2012
- Competitors: 16 from 16 nations

Medalists
gold medal	Jenny Fransson	Sweden
silver medal	Guzel Manyurova	Kazakhstan
bronze medal	Vasilisa Marzaliuk	Belarus
bronze medal	Xu Qing	China

The women's freestyle 72 kilograms is a competition featured at the 2012 World Wrestling Championships, and was held at the Millennium Place in Strathcona County, Alberta, Canada on 28 September 2012.

This freestyle wrestling competition consisted of a single-elimination tournament, with a repechage used to determine the winners of two bronze medals. The two finalists faced off for gold and silver medals. Each wrestler who lost to one of the two finalists moved into the repechage, culminating in a pair of bronze medal matches featuring the semifinal losers each facing the remaining repechage opponent from their half of the bracket.

Each bout consisted of up to three rounds, lasting two minutes apiece. The wrestler who scored more points in each round was the winner of that rounds; the bout finished when one wrestler had won two rounds (and thus the match).

== Results ==
Legend

- F — Won by fall
- WO — Won by walkover

=== Main bracket ===
Round of 16
Guzel Manyurova (KAZ)	5	7
Nataliya Palamarchuk (AZE)	0	0
Epp Mäe (EST)	1	0	0
Aline Ferreira (BRA)	1	1	2
Vasilisa Marzaliuk (BLR)	3	2
Gursharan Preet Kaur (IND)	1	0
Maria Selmaier (GER)	1	3
Stacie Anaka (CAN)	0	2
Badrakhyn Odonchimeg (MGL)	0	1
Ekaterina Bukina (RUS)	2	3
Hiroe Suzuki (JPN)	3	1	0
Xu Qing (CHN)	0	1	1
Yasemin Adar (TUR)	2	0
Jenny Fransson (SWE)	3	1
Iris Smith (USA)	0	0
Oksana Vashchuk (UKR)	3	1

Quarterfinals
Guzel Manyurova (KAZ)	1	4
Aline Ferreira (BRA)	0	0
Vasilisa Marzaliuk (BLR)	4^{F}
Maria Selmaier (GER)	0
Ekaterina Bukina (RUS)	1	0	1
Xu Qing (CHN)	0	2	2
Jenny Fransson (SWE)	5	3^{F}
Oksana Vashchuk (UKR)	0	0

Semifinals
Guzel Manyurova (KAZ)	0	1	1
Vasilisa Marzaliuk (BLR)	2	0	0
Xu Qing (CHN)	0	0
Jenny Fransson (SWE)	1	1

Final
Guzel Manyurova (KAZ)	0	1	1
Jenny Fransson (SWE)	1	0	3

=== Repechage ===
Repechage round 1
Nataliya Palamarchuk (AZE)	1	2
Aline Ferreira (BRA)	0	0
Yasemin Adar (TUR)	W	O
Oksana Vashchuk (UKR)

Bronze medals
Nataliya Palamarchuk (AZE)	0	1
Vasilisa Marzaliuk (BLR)	1	4^{F}
Yasemin Adar (TUR)	0	0
Xu Qing (CHN)	1	3
