= Zhandos Ismailov =

Kazakh freestyle wrestler

Personal information
- Born: 29 December 1994 (age 31)

Sport
- Country: Kazakhstan
- Sport: Amateur wrestling
- Weight class: 57 kg
- Event: Freestyle
Medal record
Men's freestyle wrestling
Representing Kazakhstan
Islamic Solidarity Games
Silver medal – second place	2017 Baku	57 kg
Asian Championships
Bronze medal – third place	2018 Bishkek	57 kg

Zhandos Ismailov (born 29 December 1994) is a Kazakh freestyle wrestler. He won the silver medal in the men's 57 kg event at the 2017 Islamic Solidarity Games held in Baku, Azerbaijan.

== Career ==
In 2018, Ismailov won one of the bronze medals in the 57 kg event at the Asian Wrestling Championships held in Bishkek, Kyrgyzstan.

In that same year, Ismailov also represented Kazakhstan at the Asian Games in Jakarta, Indonesia in the men's freestyle 57 kg event. In this competition, he won his first match against Hamidullah Abdullah of Afghanistan and he was eliminated from the competition in his next match against Kang Kum-song of North Korea.

== Achievements ==
Year	Tournament	Location	Result	Event
2017	Islamic Solidarity Games	Baku, Azerbaijan	2nd	Freestyle 57 kg
2018	Asian Championships	Bishkek, Kyrgyzstan	3rd	Freestyle 57 kg
