= 2020 Individual Wrestling World Cup – Women's freestyle 76 kg =

The Women's freestyle 76 kg is a competition featured at the 2020 Individual Wrestling World Cup, and was held in Belgrade, Serbia on 15 and 16 December 2020.

== Medalists ==
Gold	Aline Rotter-Focken; Germany
Silver	Yasemin Adar; Turkey
Bronze	Aiperi Medet Kyzy; Kyrgyzstan
Bronze	Vasilisa Marzaliuk; Belarus

== Results ==
Legend

- F — Won by fall

1/8 finals
Anastasiia Osniach (UKR)	4
Pauline Lecarpentier (FRA)	5
Yasemin Adar (TUR)	9
Vasilisa Marzaliuk (BLR)	3
Zsanett Németh (HUN)	7
Cătălina Axente (ROU)	6
Erica Wiebe (CAN)	2
Kiran Bishnoi (IND)	0

Quarterfinals
Mariya Oryashkova (BUL)	3
Aiperi Medet Kyzy (KGZ)	5
Aline Rotter-Focken (GER)	10
Ekaterina Bukina (RUS)	0
Pauline Lecarpentier (FRA)	2
Yasemin Adar (TUR)	11
Zsanett Németh (HUN)	0
Erica Wiebe (CAN)	10

Semifinals
Aiperi Medet Kyzy (KGZ)	4
Aline Rotter-Focken (GER)	6
Yasemin Adar (TUR)	2^{F}
Erica Wiebe (CAN)	1

Final
Aline Rotter-Focken (GER)	3^{F}
Yasemin Adar (TUR)	0

Repechage round 1
Vasilisa Marzaliuk (BLR)	6
Pauline Lecarpentier (FRA)	0

Bronze medals
Ekaterina Bukina (RUS)	8
Aiperi Medet Kyzy (KGZ)	11
Vasilisa Marzaliuk (BLR)	3
Erica Wiebe (CAN)	1
