= 2017 World Wrestling Championships – Women's freestyle 75 kg =

Women's freestyle 75 kg at the 2017 World Championships
- Venue: AccorHotels Arena
- Dates: 23 August 2017
- Competitors: 23 from 23 nations

Medalists
gold medal	Yasemin Adar	Turkey
silver medal	Vasilisa Marzaliuk	Belarus
bronze medal	Hiroe Suzuki	Japan
bronze medal	Justina Di Stasio	Canada

The women's freestyle 75 kilograms is a competition featured at the 2017 World Wrestling Championships, and was held in Paris, France on 23 August 2017.

This freestyle wrestling competition consisted of a single-elimination tournament, with a repechage used to determine the winners of two bronze medals.

== Results ==
Legend

- F — Won by fall

=== Final ===
Final
Yasemin Adar (TUR)	5
Vasilisa Marzaliuk (BLR)	4

=== Top half ===
Round of 32
Aline Ferreira (BRA)	0
Epp Mäe (EST)	3

Round of 16
Yasemin Adar (TUR)	2^{F}
Maria Selmaier (GER)	0
Hiroe Suzuki (JPN)	10
Elena Perepelkina (RUS)	0
Pauline Lecarpentier (FRA)	0
Gan-Ochiryn Urtnasan (MGL)	7
Kateryna Burmistrova (UKR)	0
Epp Mäe (EST)	2

Quarterfinals
Yasemin Adar (TUR)	6
Hiroe Suzuki (JPN)	1
Gan-Ochiryn Urtnasan (MGL)	2
Epp Mäe (EST)	4

Semifinals
Yasemin Adar (TUR)	8
Epp Mäe (EST)	5

=== Bottom half ===
Round of 32
Viktoria Bobeva (BUL)	0
Paliha (CHN)	10
Victoria Francis (USA)	3
Gulmaral Yerkebayeva (KAZ)	10
Andrea Olaya (COL)	4
Iselin Moen Solheim (NOR)	1
Justina Di Stasio (CAN)	10
Svetlana Saenko (MDA)	0
Pooja Sihag (IND)	6^{F}
Samar Amer (EGY)	1
Heo Nam-ju (KOR)	0
Aiperi Medet Kyzy (KGZ)	3

Round of 16
Zsanett Németh (HUN)	4
Paliha (CHN)	8
Gulmaral Yerkebayeva (KAZ)	0
Andrea Olaya (COL)	8
Justina Di Stasio (CAN)	7
Pooja Sihag (IND)	0
Aiperi Medet Kyzy (KGZ)	0
Vasilisa Marzaliuk (BLR)	6

Quarterfinals
Paliha (CHN)	7
Andrea Olaya (COL)	1
Justina Di Stasio (CAN)	4
Vasilisa Marzaliuk (BLR)	7

Semifinals
Paliha (CHN)	2
Vasilisa Marzaliuk (BLR)	4^{F}

=== Repechage ===
Repechage round 2
Maria Selmaier (GER)	1
Hiroe Suzuki (JPN)	2
Aiperi Medet Kyzy (KGZ)	4
Justina Di Stasio (CAN)	6

Bronze medals
Hiroe Suzuki (JPN)	6
Epp Mäe (EST)	0
Justina Di Stasio (CAN)	3^{F}
Paliha (CHN)	1
