= 2018 European Wrestling Championships – Women's freestyle 76 kg =

The women's freestyle 76 kg is a competition featured at the 2018 European Wrestling Championships, and was held in Kaspiysk, Russia on May 2 and May 3.

== Medalists ==
Gold	Yasemin Adar; Turkey
Silver	Ekaterina Bukina; Russia
Bronze	Vasilisa Marzaliuk; Belarus
Bronze	Sabira Aliyeva; Azerbaijan

== Results ==
Legend

- F — Won by fall

=== Main Bracket ===
Quarterfinals		Semifinals		Final
Yasemin Adar (TUR)	10
Epp Mäe (EST)	0	Yasemin Adar (TUR)	3
Svetlana Saenko (MDA)	0	Vasilisa Marzaliuk (BLR)	2
Vasilisa Marzaliuk (BLR)	8			Yasemin Adar (TUR)	8
Zsanett Németh (HUN)	6			Ekaterina Bukina (RUS)	2
Sabira Aliyeva (AZE)	9	Sabira Aliyeva (AZE)	0
Iryna Pasichnyk (UKR)	0	Ekaterina Bukina (RUS)	11
Ekaterina Bukina (RUS)	9

=== Repechage ===
Bronze medal match
Epp Mäe (EST)	2
Vasilisa Marzaliuk (BLR)	8
Iryna Pasichnyk (UKR)	3
Sabira Aliyeva (AZE)	6
