= 2020 Yasar Dogu Tournament =

Yasar Dogu 2020
- Host city: Istanbul, Turkey
- Dates: January 10–12
- Stadium: Bağcılar Olympic Sport Hall

Champions
- Freestyle: Azerbaijan
- Women: Turkey

The 48th Yasar Dogu Tournament 2020, was a wrestling event held in Istanbul, Turkey between 10 and 12 January 2020.

The international tournament included competition in both men's and women's freestyle wrestling. The tournament was held in honor of the two time Olympic Champion, Yaşar Doğu.

== Medal overview ==
=== Medal table ===
Rank	Nation	Gold	Silver	Bronze	Total
1	Azerbaijan	5	2	9	16
2	Turkey	4	9	14	27
3	Bulgaria	3	2	2	7
4	Romania	2	0	2	4
5	Kyrgyzstan	2	0	1	3
6	Uzbekistan	1	1	2	4
7	Hungary	1	1	1	3
8	Czech Republic	1	0	0	1
8	Greece	1	0	0	1
10	Georgia	0	4	3	7
11	Moldova	0	1	0	1
12	Russia	0	0	2	2
13	Turkmenistan	0	0	1	1
Totals (13 entries)		20	20	37	77

=== Men's freestyle ===
Event	Gold	Silver	Bronze
57 kg	(Bulgaria) Georgi Vangelov	(Uzbekistan) Gulomjon Abdullaeev	(Russia) Petr Konstantinov
57 kg	(Bulgaria) Georgi Vangelov	(Uzbekistan) Gulomjon Abdullaeev	(Azerbaijan) Afgan Khaslov
61 kg	(Turkey) Hamza Alaca	(Azerbaijan) Intigam Valizade	(Turkey) Recep Topal
61 kg	(Turkey) Hamza Alaca	(Azerbaijan) Intigam Valizade	(Turkey) Recep Aktaş
65 kg	(Azerbaijan) Ali Rahimzade	(Georgia (country)) Edemi Bolkvazde	(Turkmenistan) Kerim Hojakov
65 kg	(Azerbaijan) Ali Rahimzade	(Georgia (country)) Edemi Bolkvazde	(Azerbaijan) Turan Bayramov
70 kg	(Uzbekistan) Ilyas Bekbulatov	(Turkey) Haydar Yavuz	(Russia) Viktor Rassadin
70 kg	(Uzbekistan) Ilyas Bekbulatov	(Turkey) Haydar Yavuz	(Azerbaijan) Aghahuseyin Mustafayev
74 kg	(Bulgaria) Ali-Pasha Umarpashaev	(Georgia (country)) Georgi Sulava	(Azerbaijan) Khadzhimurad Gadzhiyev
74 kg	(Bulgaria) Ali-Pasha Umarpashaev	(Georgia (country)) Georgi Sulava	(Turkey) Yakup Gör
79 kg	(Azerbaijan) Abubakr Abakarov	(Turkey) Nuri Temur	(Turkey) Muhammet Nuri Kotanoğlu
79 kg	(Azerbaijan) Abubakr Abakarov	(Turkey) Nuri Temur	(Turkey) Ahmet Batuhan Kış
86 kg	(Turkey) Selim Yaşar	(Bulgaria) Akhmed Magamaev	(Georgia (country)) Sandro Aminishvili
86 kg	(Turkey) Selim Yaşar	(Bulgaria) Akhmed Magamaev	(Azerbaijan) Osman Nurmagamedov
92 kg	(Azerbaijan) Aslanber Albarou	(Georgia (country)) Dato Marsagishvili	(Azerbaijan) Shamil Zubariov
92 kg	(Azerbaijan) Aslanber Albarou	(Georgia (country)) Dato Marsagishvili	(Georgia (country)) Irakli Mitsituri
97 kg	(Romania) Albert Saritov	(Georgia (country)) Givi Matcharashvili	(Georgia (country)) Zuriko Urtashvili
97 kg	(Romania) Albert Saritov	(Georgia (country)) Givi Matcharashvili	(Uzbekistan) Magomed Ibragimov
125 kg	(Azerbaijan) Jamaladdin Magomedov	(Turkey) Tanju Gemici	(Uzbekistan) Khasanboy Rakhimov

=== Women's freestyle ===
Event	Gold	Silver	Bronze
50 kg	(Bulgaria) Miglena Selishka	(Turkey) Evin Demirhan	(Turkey) Aynur Erge
50 kg	(Bulgaria) Miglena Selishka	(Turkey) Evin Demirhan	(Azerbaijan) Turkan Nasirova
53 kg	(Greece) Maria Prevolaraki	(Moldova) Iulia Leorda	(Turkey) Zeynep Yetgil
53 kg	(Greece) Maria Prevolaraki	(Moldova) Iulia Leorda	(Romania) Andreea Ana
55 kg	(Turkey) Melda Dernekçi	(Turkey) Dilan Kaya	(Turkey) Esra Pul
57 kg	(Hungary) Emese Barka	(Bulgaria) Bilyana Dudova	(Bulgaria) Mimi Hristova
57 kg	(Hungary) Emese Barka	(Bulgaria) Bilyana Dudova	(Hungary) Ramóna Galambos
59 kg	(Kyrgyzstan) Nazira Marsbek Kyzy	(Turkey) Elif Yanık	(Turkey) Nurife Duman
59 kg	(Kyrgyzstan) Nazira Marsbek Kyzy	(Turkey) Elif Yanık	(Turkey) İkarnur Akkuş
62 kg	(Kyrgyzstan) Aisuluu Tynybekova	(Azerbaijan) Tetiana Omelchenko	(Turkey) Elif Jale Yeşilırmak
62 kg	(Kyrgyzstan) Aisuluu Tynybekova	(Azerbaijan) Tetiana Omelchenko	(Azerbaijan) Elmira Gambarova
65 kg	(Azerbaijan) Elis Manolova	(Turkey) Derya Bayhan	(Turkey) Sude Berdan
65 kg	(Azerbaijan) Elis Manolova	(Turkey) Derya Bayhan	(Turkey) Aslı Tuğcu
68 kg	(Czech Republic) Adéla Hanzlíčková	(Turkey) Buse Tosun	(Romania) Alexandra Anghel
68 kg	(Czech Republic) Adéla Hanzlíčková	(Turkey) Buse Tosun	(Azerbaijan) Irina Netreba
72 kg	(Romania) Cătălina Axente	(Turkey) Merve Pul	(Turkey) Vahide Nur Gök
76 kg	(Turkey) Yasemin Adar	(Hungary) Zsanett Németh	(Bulgaria) Maria Oryashkova
76 kg	(Turkey) Yasemin Adar	(Hungary) Zsanett Németh	(Kyrgyzstan) Aiperi Medet Kyzy

== Participating nations ==
- Bulgaria
- Czech Republic
- Georgia
- Greece
- Jordan
- Kazakhstan
- Kyrgyzstan
- Moldova
- Norway
- Romania
- Russia
- Tajikistan
- Turkmenistan
- Tunisia
- Turkey
- Ukraine
- Uzbekistan
