= 2017 European Wrestling Championships – Women's freestyle 75 kg =

The women's freestyle 75 kg is a competition featured at the 2017 European Wrestling Championships, and was held in Novi Sad, Serbia on May 4.

== Medalists ==
Gold	Yasemin Adar; Turkey
Silver	Zsanett Németh; Hungary
Bronze	Svetlana Saenko; Moldova
Bronze	Epp Mäe; Estonia

== Results ==
Legend

- F — Won by fall

=== Top half ===
Qualification
Epp Mäe (EST)	5^{F}
Gabriela Peycheva (BUL)	0
Yasemin Adar (TUR)	7
Vasilisa Marzaliuk (BLR)	1
Alena Starodubtseva (RUS)	11^{F}
Daria Osocka (POL)	2

Quarterfinals
Anna Schell (GER)	1
Zsanett Németh (HUN)	2
Svetlana Saenko (MDA)	12
Iryna Pasichnyk (UKR)	1
Iselin Solheim (NOR)	2
Epp Mäe (EST)	13
Yasemin Adar (TUR)	10
Alena Starodubtseva (RUS)	0

Semifinals
Zsanett Németh (HUN)	4
Svetlana Saenko (MDA)	3
Epp Mäe (EST)	4
Yasemin Adar (TUR)	5

Final
Zsanett Németh (HUN)	0
Yasemin Adar (TUR)	10

=== Repechage ===
Repechage round 2
Vasilisa Marzaliuk (BLR)	8
Alena Starodubtseva (RUS)	3

Bronze medals
Anna Schell (GER)	3
Svetlana Saenko (MDA)	8
Vasilisa Marzaliuk (BLR)	1
Epp Mäe (EST)	2
