= 2019 European Wrestling Championships – Women's freestyle 76 kg =

The women's freestyle 76 kg is a competition featured at the 2019 European Wrestling Championships, and was held in Bucharest, Romania on April 10 and April 11.

== Medalists ==
Gold	Yasemin Adar; Turkey
Silver	Martina Kuenz; Austria
Bronze	Zsanett Németh; Hungary
Bronze	Aline Rotter-Focken; Germany

== Results ==
Legend

- F — Won by fall

=== Final ===
Final
Martina Kuenz (AUT)	1
Yasemin Adar (TUR)	6

=== Top half ===
Round of 32

Round of 16
Zsanett Németh (HUN)	8
Daria Shisterova (RUS)	4
Sabira Aliyeva (AZE)	5
Natallia Lanko (BLR)	0
Aikaterini Pitsiava (GRE)	0
Iselin Moen Solheim (NOR)	5^{F}
Martina Kuenz (AUT)	10
Diana Vlăsceanu (ROU)	0

Quarterfinals
Zsanett Németh (HUN)	7
Sabira Aliyeva (AZE)	1
Iselin Moen Solheim (NOR)	0
Martina Kuenz (AUT)	5

Semifinals
Zsanett Németh (HUN)	3
Martina Kuenz (AUT)	9

=== Bottom half ===
Round of 32
Enrica Rinaldi (ITA)	0
Aline Rotter-Focken (GER)	11

Round of 16
Yasemin Adar (TUR)	6^{F}
Georgina Nelthorpe (GBR)	0
Kamilė Gaučaitė (LTU)	4
Mariya Oryashkova (BUL)	3
Epp Mäe (EST)	10
Daria Osocka (POL)	0
Alla Belinska (UKR)	0
Aline Rotter-Focken (GER)	6

Quarterfinals
Yasemin Adar (TUR)	10
Kamilė Gaučaitė (LTU)	0
Epp Mäe (EST)	4
Aline Rotter-Focken (GER)	8

Semifinals
Yasemin Adar (TUR)	5
Aline Rotter-Focken (GER)	2

=== Repechage ===
Repechage round 1
Diana Vlăsceanu (ROU)	3
Iselin Moen Solheim (NOR)	8^{F}
Georgina Nelthorpe (GBR)	0
Kamilė Gaučaitė (LTU)	2

Bronze medal match
Iselin Moen Solheim (NOR)	1
Zsanett Németh (HUN)	6
Kamilė Gaučaitė (LTU)	0
Aline Rotter-Focken (GER)	6^{F}
