= Wrestling at the 2017 Islamic Solidarity Games =

- Host city: Azerbaijan, Baku
- Dates: 17—21 May
- Stadium: Heydar Aliyev Sports and Exhibition Complex

Wrestling at the 2017 Islamic Solidarity Games was held in Heydar Aliyev Arena, Heydar Aliyev Sports and Exhibition Complex, Baku, Azerbaijan from 17 May to 21 May 2017.

== Medalists ==
=== Men's freestyle ===
Event	Gold	Silver	Bronze
57 kg	Mahir Amiraslanov; Azerbaijan	Zhandos Ismailov; Kazakhstan	Nebi Uzun; Turkey
57 kg	Mahir Amiraslanov; Azerbaijan	Zhandos Ismailov; Kazakhstan	Nodirjon Safarov; Uzbekistan
61 kg	Haji Aliyev; Azerbaijan	Alibek Osmonov; Kyrgyzstan	Abdul Wahab; Pakistan
61 kg	Haji Aliyev; Azerbaijan	Alibek Osmonov; Kyrgyzstan	Masoud Esmaeilpour; Iran
65 kg	Meisam Nassiri; Iran	Magomed Muslimov; Azerbaijan	Ilyas Zhumay; Kazakhstan
65 kg	Meisam Nassiri; Iran	Magomed Muslimov; Azerbaijan	Mbundé Cumba; Guinea-Bissau
70 kg	Mostafa Hosseinkhani; Iran	Murtazali Muslimov; Azerbaijan	Zafer Dama; Turkey
70 kg	Mostafa Hosseinkhani; Iran	Murtazali Muslimov; Azerbaijan	Adam Batirov; Bahrain
74 kg	Muslim Evloev; Kyrgyzstan	Soner Demirtaş; Turkey	Bolat Sakayev; Kazakhstan
74 kg	Muslim Evloev; Kyrgyzstan	Soner Demirtaş; Turkey	Bekzod Abdurakhmonov; Uzbekistan
86 kg	Hassan Yazdani; Iran	Selim Yaşar; Turkey	Sharif Sharifov; Azerbaijan
86 kg	Hassan Yazdani; Iran	Selim Yaşar; Turkey	Adilet Davlumbayev; Kazakhstan
97 kg	Nurmagomed Gadzhiyev; Azerbaijan	Amir Mohammadi; Iran	Ýusup Melejaýew; Turkmenistan
97 kg	Nurmagomed Gadzhiyev; Azerbaijan	Amir Mohammadi; Iran	Mamed Ibragimov; Kazakhstan
125 kg	Jamaladdin Magomedov; Azerbaijan	Daulet Shabanbay; Kazakhstan	Jaber Sadeghzadeh; Iran
125 kg	Jamaladdin Magomedov; Azerbaijan	Daulet Shabanbay; Kazakhstan	Salim Ercan; Turkey

=== Men's Greco-Roman ===
Event	Gold	Silver	Bronze
59 kg	Kanybek Zholchubekov; Kyrgyzstan	Islomjon Bakhromov; Uzbekistan	Murad Mammadov; Azerbaijan
59 kg	Kanybek Zholchubekov; Kyrgyzstan	Islomjon Bakhromov; Uzbekistan	Seýdylla Täzäýew; Turkmenistan
66 kg	Kamran Mammadov; Azerbaijan	Zhanat Kyilybaev; Kyrgyzstan	Abdulsamet Günal; Turkey
66 kg	Kamran Mammadov; Azerbaijan	Zhanat Kyilybaev; Kyrgyzstan	Mehdi Zeidvand; Iran
71 kg	Mohammad Ali Geraei; Iran	Ruslan Tsarev; Kyrgyzstan	Rasul Chunayev; Azerbaijan
71 kg	Mohammad Ali Geraei; Iran	Ruslan Tsarev; Kyrgyzstan	Taha Yaseen; Iraq
75 kg	Elvin Mursaliyev; Azerbaijan	Furkan Bayrak; Turkey	Şermet Permanow; Turkmenistan
75 kg	Elvin Mursaliyev; Azerbaijan	Furkan Bayrak; Turkey	Kairatbek Tugolbaev; Kyrgyzstan
80 kg	Yousef Ghaderian; Iran	Rafig Huseynov; Azerbaijan	Burhan Akbudak; Turkey
80 kg	Yousef Ghaderian; Iran	Rafig Huseynov; Azerbaijan	Bachir Sid Azara; Algeria
85 kg	Islam Abbasov; Azerbaijan	Ali Cengiz; Turkey	Mehdi Fallah; Iran
85 kg	Islam Abbasov; Azerbaijan	Ali Cengiz; Turkey	Adem Boudjemline; Algeria
98 kg	Orkhan Nuriyev; Azerbaijan	Uzur Dzhuzupbekov; Kyrgyzstan	Rustam Assakalov; Uzbekistan
98 kg	Orkhan Nuriyev; Azerbaijan	Uzur Dzhuzupbekov; Kyrgyzstan	Süleyman Demirci; Turkey
130 kg	Osman Yıldırım; Turkey	Muminjon Abdullaev; Uzbekistan	Shahab Ghourehjili; Iran
130 kg	Osman Yıldırım; Turkey	Muminjon Abdullaev; Uzbekistan	Sabah Shariati; Azerbaijan

=== Women's freestyle ===
Event	Gold	Silver	Bronze
48 kg	Mariya Stadnik; Azerbaijan	Evin Demirhan; Turkey	Chaima Yahiaoui; Algeria
48 kg	Mariya Stadnik; Azerbaijan	Evin Demirhan; Turkey	None awarded
53 kg	Leyla Gurbanova; Azerbaijan	Burcu Kebiç; Turkey	Aigul Nuralim; Kazakhstan
53 kg	Leyla Gurbanova; Azerbaijan	Burcu Kebiç; Turkey	None awarded
55 kg	Odunayo Adekuoroye; Nigeria	Nataliya Synyshyn; Azerbaijan	Bediha Gün; Turkey
55 kg	Odunayo Adekuoroye; Nigeria	Nataliya Synyshyn; Azerbaijan	None awarded
58 kg	Aisuluu Tynybekova; Kyrgyzstan	Alyona Kolesnik; Azerbaijan	Derya Bayhan; Turkey
58 kg	Aisuluu Tynybekova; Kyrgyzstan	Alyona Kolesnik; Azerbaijan	None awarded
60 kg	Tetiana Omelchenko; Azerbaijan	Gamze Nur Adakan; Turkey	Joseph Essombe; Cameroon
60 kg	Tetiana Omelchenko; Azerbaijan	Gamze Nur Adakan; Turkey	None awarded
63 kg	Blessing Oborududu; Nigeria	Hafize Şahin; Turkey	Elmira Gambarova; Azerbaijan
63 kg	Blessing Oborududu; Nigeria	Hafize Şahin; Turkey	Zarina Kunangarayeva; Kazakhstan
69 kg	Elis Manolova; Azerbaijan	Zhamila Bakbergenova; Kazakhstan	Sherin Sultana; Bangladesh
69 kg	Elis Manolova; Azerbaijan	Zhamila Bakbergenova; Kazakhstan	Buse Tosun; Turkey
75 kg	Yasemin Adar; Turkey	Sabira Aliyeva; Azerbaijan	Aiperi Medet Kyzy; Kyrgyzstan
75 kg	Yasemin Adar; Turkey	Sabira Aliyeva; Azerbaijan	None awarded

== Medal table ==
Rank	Nation	Gold	Silver	Bronze	Total
1	Azerbaijan (AZE)	12	6	5	23
2	Iran (IRI)	5	1	5	11
3	Kyrgyzstan (KGZ)	3	4	2	9
4	Turkey (TUR)	2	8	9	19
5	Nigeria (NGR)	2	0	0	2
6	Kazakhstan (KAZ)	0	3	6	9
7	Uzbekistan (UZB)	0	2	3	5
8	Algeria (ALG)	0	0	3	3
8	Turkmenistan (TKM)	0	0	3	3
10	Bahrain (BHR)	0	0	1	1
10	Bangladesh (BAN)	0	0	1	1
10	Cameroon (CMR)	0	0	1	1
10	Guinea-Bissau (GBS)	0	0	1	1
10	Iraq (IRQ)	0	0	1	1
10	Pakistan (PAK)	0	0	1	1
Totals (15 entries)		24	24	42	90
