= Iselin Moen Solheim =

Norwegian freestyle wrestler

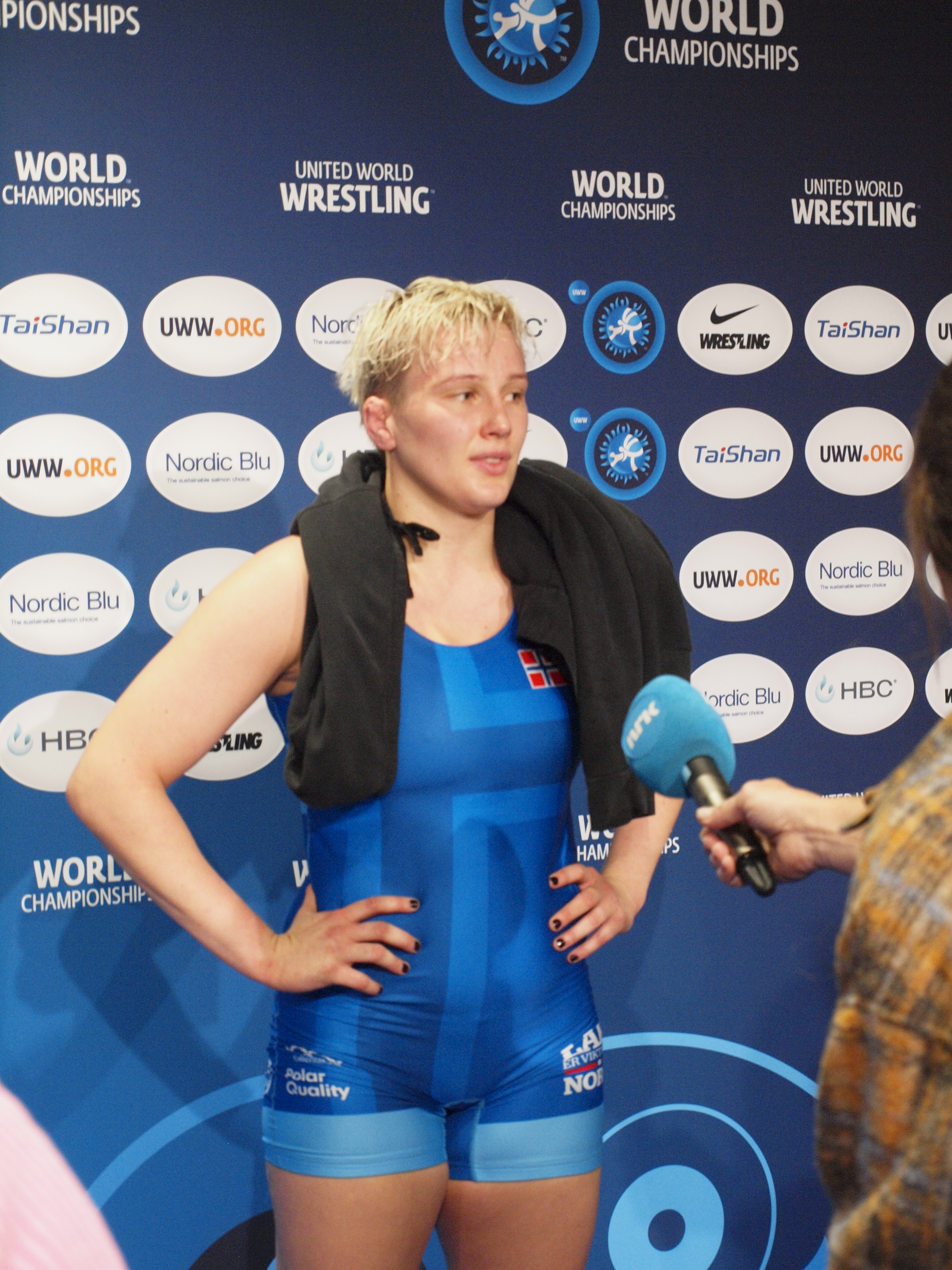
- Iselin Moen Solheim at the 2021 World Wrestling Championships in Oslo, Norway

Personal information
- Full name: Iselin Maria Moen Solheim
- Born: 7 August 1995 (age 31) Notodden, Norway
- Height: 174 cm (5 ft 9 in)

Sport
- Country: Norway
- Sport: Amateur wrestling
- Weight class: 76 kg
- Event: Freestyle
Medal record
Women's freestyle wrestling
Representing Norway
European Games
Bronze medal – third place	2019 Minsk	76 kg
European Championships
Bronze medal – third place	2020 Rome	76 kg
European U23 Championship
Bronze medal – third place	2018 Istanbul	76 kg

Iselin Maria Moen Solheim (born 7 August 1995) is a Norwegian freestyle wrestler from Notodden Municipality. She won one of the bronze medals in the women's 76 kg event at the 2019 European Games held in Minsk, Belarus. She also won a bronze medal at the 2020 European Wrestling Championships held in Rome, Italy.

== Career ==
In 2016, she competed in the second Olympic Qualification Tournament held in Istanbul, Turkey. Her hopes of competing at the 2016 Summer Olympics were dashed when she lost her first match against Maria Selmaier of Germany. She then entered the repechage where she won against Dayanara Rivera of Puerto Rico but failed to secure the bronze medal in her match against Gozal Zutova of Azerbaijan.

In 2017, she competed in the women's freestyle 75 kg event at the European Wrestling Championships held in Novi Sad, Serbia where she was eliminated in her first match by Epp Mäe of Estonia. Mäe went on to win one of the bronze medals. In the same year, she also competed in the women's freestyle 75 kg event at the 2017 World Wrestling Championships held in Paris, France. She was eliminated in her first match by Andrea Olaya of Colombia. In 2018, she competed at the Klippan Lady Open in Klippan, Sweden without winning a medal. At the 2018 European U23 Wrestling Championship in Istanbul, Turkey, she won one of the bronze medals in the women's 76 kg event.

In 2019, she competed in the women's 76 kg event at the European Wrestling Championships in Bucharest, Romania where she lost her bronze medal match against Zsanett Németh of Hungary. At the 2020 European Wrestling Championships in Rome, Italy, she won one of the bronze medals in the women's 76 kg event. In her bronze medal match she defeated Vasilisa Marzaliuk of Belarus.

In March 2021, she competed at the European Qualification Tournament in Budapest, Hungary hoping to qualify for the 2020 Summer Olympics in Tokyo, Japan. She did not qualify as she lost her match in the quarterfinals against Natalia Vorobieva of Russia. She then also lost her bronze medal match against Martina Kuenz of Austria. In April 2021, she was eliminated in her first match in the 76 kg event at the European Wrestling Championships in Warsaw, Poland. In May 2021, she failed to qualify for the Olympics at the World Olympic Qualification Tournament held in Sofia, Bulgaria. She was eliminated in her first match by Zsanett Németh of Hungary. In October 2021, she was eliminated in her first match in the 76 kg event at the World Wrestling Championships held in Oslo, Norway.

== Achievements ==
Year	Tournament	Location	Result	Event
2019	European Games	Minsk, Belarus	3rd	Freestyle 76 kg
2020	European Championships	Rome, Italy	3rd	Freestyle 76 kg
