= Wrestling at the 2018 Asian Games – Men's freestyle 57 kg =

Men's freestyle 57 kg at the 2018 Asian Games
- Venue: Jakarta Convention Center
- Date: 19 August 2018
- Competitors: 19 from 19 nations

Medalists
gold medal	Erdenebatyn Bekhbayar	Mongolia
silver medal	Kang Kum-song	North Korea
bronze medal	Yuki Takahashi	Japan
bronze medal	Reza Atri	Iran

The men's freestyle 57 kilograms wrestling competition at the 2018 Asian Games in Jakarta was held on 19 August 2018 at the Jakarta Convention Center Assembly Hall.

== Schedule ==
All times are Western Indonesia Time (UTC+07:00)

Date	Time	Event
Sunday, 19 August 2018	13:00	Qualifications
Sunday, 19 August 2018	13:00	1/8 finals
Sunday, 19 August 2018	13:00	Quarterfinals
Sunday, 19 August 2018	13:00	Semifinals
Sunday, 19 August 2018	13:00	Repechages
Sunday, 19 August 2018	20:00	Finals

== Results ==
Legend

- F — Won by fall
- WO — Won by walkover

=== Main bracket ===
==== Final ====
Final
Kang Kum-song (PRK)	2
Erdenebatyn Bekhbayar (MGL)	8

==== Top half ====
Qualifications

1/8 finals
Eko Roni Saputra (INA)	10
Charles Fernando (SRI)	0
Liu Minghu (CHN)	WO
Mohammed Al-Maghrebi (YEM)
Zhandos Ismailov (KAZ)	10
Hamidullah Abdullah (AFG)	0
Yuki Takahashi (JPN)	5
Kang Kum-song (PRK)	9

Quarterfinals
Eko Roni Saputra (INA)	5
Liu Minghu (CHN)	10
Zhandos Ismailov (KAZ)	1
Kang Kum-song (PRK)	3

Semifinals
Liu Minghu (CHN)	0
Kang Kum-song (PRK)	10

==== Bottom half ====
Qualifications
Makhmudjon Shavkatov (UZB)	7
Muhammad Bilal (PAK)	2
Erdenebatyn Bekhbayar (MGL)	7
Hikmatullo Vohidov (TJK)	0
Kim Sung-gwon (KOR)	7
Almaz Smanbekov (KGZ)	6

1/8 finals
Rüstem Nazarow (TKM)	8
Sandeep Tomar (IND)	12
Bhagawati Sah Teli (NEP)	0
Reza Atri (IRI)	10
Alvin Lobreguito (PHI)	2
Makhmudjon Shavkatov (UZB)	11
Erdenebatyn Bekhbayar (MGL)	4^{F}
Kim Sung-gwon (KOR)	0

Quarterfinals
Sandeep Tomar (IND)	9
Reza Atri (IRI)	15
Makhmudjon Shavkatov (UZB)	4
Erdenebatyn Bekhbayar (MGL)	5

Semifinals
Reza Atri (IRI)	2
Erdenebatyn Bekhbayar (MGL)	8

=== Repechage ===
Repechage round 1
Hikmatullo Vohidov (TJK)	0
Kim Sung-gwon (KOR)	9

Repechage round 2
Yuki Takahashi (JPN)	7
Zhandos Ismailov (KAZ)	4
Kim Sung-gwon (KOR)	5
Makhmudjon Shavkatov (UZB)	1

Bronze medals
Yuki Takahashi (JPN)	3
Liu Minghu (CHN)	3
Kim Sung-gwon (KOR)	4
Reza Atri (IRI)	9

== Final standing ==
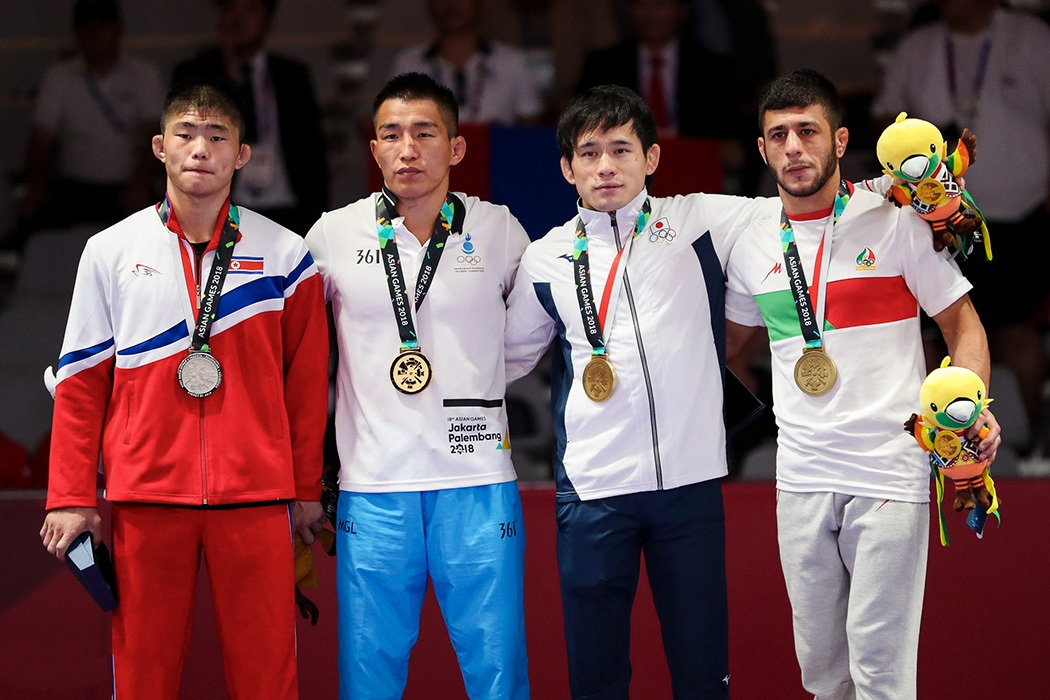
Podium, Left-right: Kang, Bekhbayar, Takahashi, Atri

Rank	Athlete
1st place, gold medalist(s)	Erdenebatyn Bekhbayar (MGL)
2nd place, silver medalist(s)	Kang Kum-song (PRK)
3rd place, bronze medalist(s)	Yuki Takahashi (JPN)
3rd place, bronze medalist(s)	Reza Atri (IRI)
5	Liu Minghu (CHN)
5	Kim Sung-gwon (KOR)
7	Makhmudjon Shavkatov (UZB)
8	Zhandos Ismailov (KAZ)
9	Eko Roni Saputra (INA)
10	Sandeep Tomar (IND)
11	Almaz Smanbekov (KGZ)
12	Muhammad Bilal (PAK)
13	Alvin Lobreguito (PHI)
14	Charles Fernando (SRI)
15	Hamidullah Abdullah (AFG)
16	Bhagawati Sah Teli (NEP)
17	Hikmatullo Vohidov (TJK)
—	Mohammed Al-Maghrebi (YEM)
DQ	Rüstem Nazarow (TKM)

- Rüstem Nazarow of Turkmenistan originally got the 11th place, but was disqualified after he tested positive for Furosemide in a pre-tournament urine test.
