= Signe Marie Store =

Norwegian freestyle wrestler

Personal information
- Nationality: Norwegian
- Born: Signe Marie Fidje Store; 23 August 1995 (age 31) Tana, Norway

Sport
- Country: Norway
- Sport: Amateur wrestling
- Event: Freestyle wrestling
- Club: Bryteklubben Tana

Signe Marie Store (born 23 August 1995) is a Norwegian freestyle wrestler. She competed in the women's 69 kg event at the 2016 Summer Olympics in Rio de Janeiro, where she became the first female wrestler to represent Norway at the Olympics. Store has won multiple Norwegian Championship titles at both senior and junior level.
