= Kang Kum-song =

North Korean wrestler (born 1998)

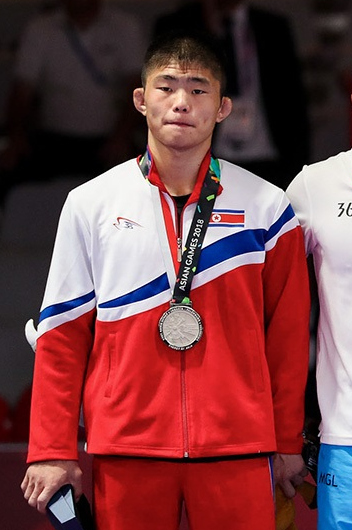
- Wrestling at the 2018 Asian Games – Men's freestyle 57 kg

Personal information
- Nationality: North Korea
- Born: 1 May 1998 (age 28)
- Height: 165 cm (5 ft 5 in)
- Weight: 57 kg (126 lb)

Sport
- Country: North Korea
- Sport: Freestyle Wrestling
- Weight class: 57 kg
- Club: Sports Club, Pyoenyang
- Coached by: Li Myong Hak
Medal record
Representing North Korea
Men's Freestyle Wrestling
Asian Games
Silver medal – second place	2018 Jakarta	57 kg
Asian Championships
Gold medal – first place	2018 Bishkek	57 kg
Silver medal – second place	2019 Xi'an	57 kg

- Kang Kum-song
- Hangul: 강금성
- RR: Gang Geumseong
- MR: Kang Kŭmsŏng

Kang Kum-song (Korean: 강금성; born 1 May 1998) is a North Korean freestyle wrestler. He won silver in the men's 57 kg division at the 18th Asian Games in Jakarta-Palembang, Indonesia, 2018.
