= Shilpi Sheoran =

Indian freestyle wrestler

Shilpi Sheoran Yadav
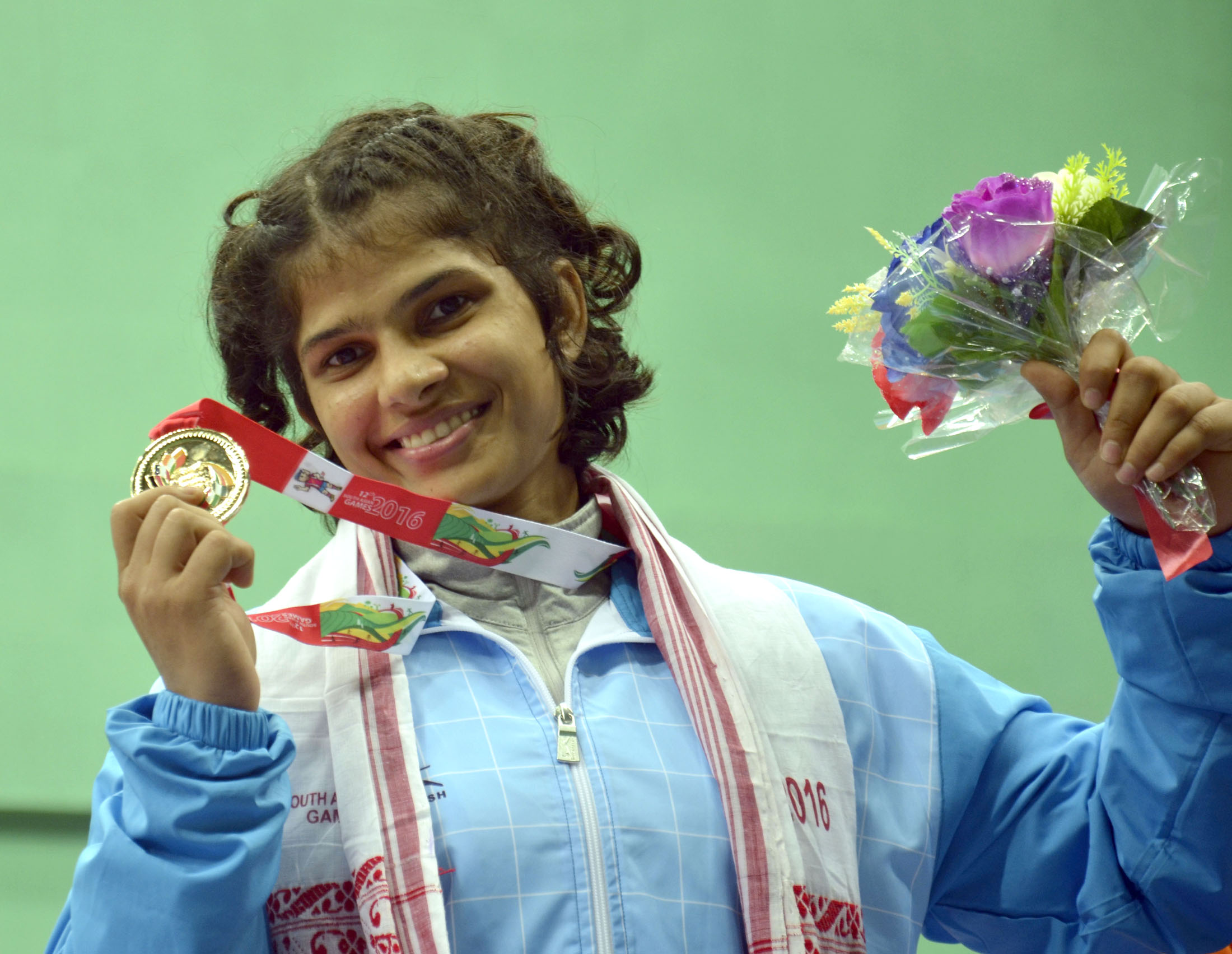
- Sheoran at the 2016 South Asian Games

Personal information
- Nationality: India
- Born: 31 May 1989 (age 37) Hisar, Haryana, India
- Occupation: Wrestler
- Spouse: Narsingh Yadav
Medal record
Woman's freestyle wrestling
Representing India
Commonwealth Championships
Silver medal – second place	2011 Melbourne	55 kg
South Asian Games
Gold medal – first place	2016 Guwahati	63 kg

Shilpi Sheoran Yadav (born 31 May 1989) is an Indian freestyle wrestler.

== Personal life and family ==
Shilpi Sheoran was born to a Hindu family to Subhash Chander Sheoran of Kanwari village in Hisar district, Haryana, which is only 15 km linear distance from Balali village of Phogat sisters. She earned an MA in English from Government College, Hisar, and M PEd (Master in Physical Education) from Kurukshetra University. Sheoran is married to wrestler Narsingh Yadav. She was married on Friday, 10 March 2017. Her husband trains her in akhara. Her husband credits her love during his toughest phase to bring him out of depression.

== Sports career ==
She is a roommate of Navjot Kaur.

In 2016, she won gold in the South Asian Games in Guwahati after she defeated Bangladesh's Farzana Sharmin in the women's 63 kg final bout.

In 2017, she made it to the World wrestling championship's women's 63 kg repechage round where she lost out.
