= Yasemin Adar Yiğit =

Turkish freestyle wrestler (born 1991)

Yasemin Adar
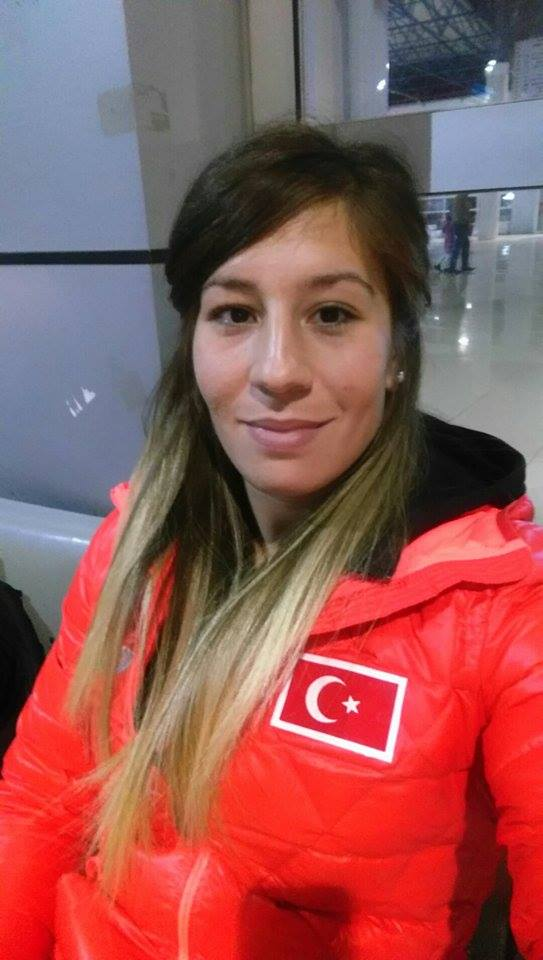
- Adar in 2016

Personal information
- Full name: Yasemin Adar Yiğit
- Nationality: Turkish
- Born: 6 December 1991 (age 34) Balıkesir, Turkey
- Education: Trakya University; Balıkesir University
- Height: 1.81 m (5 ft 11 in)
- Weight: 76 kg (168 lb)

Sport
- Country: Turkey
- Sport: Women's freestyle wrestling
- Event: 76 kg
- Club: Balıkesir BB
- Turned pro: 2011
- Coached by: Habil Kara
- Retired: 2025
Medal record
Event	1st	2nd	3rd
Olympic Games	0	0	1
World Championship	2	1	0
European Championships	7	2	0
Mediterranean Games	2	0	0
Islamic Solidarity Games	1	0	0
Yasar Dogu Tournament	3	1	2
Other	5	3	0
Total	20	7	3
Women's freestyle wrestling
Representing Turkey
Olympic Games
Bronze medal – third place	2020 Tokyo	76 kg
World Championships
Gold medal – first place	2017 Paris	75 kg
Gold medal – first place	2022 Belgrade	76 kg
Silver medal – second place	2018 Budapest	76 kg
European Championships
Gold medal – first place	2016 Riga	75 kg
Gold medal – first place	2017 Novi Sad	75 kg
Gold medal – first place	2018 Kaspiysk	76 kg
Gold medal – first place	2019 Bucharest	76 kg
Gold medal – first place	2022 Budapest	76 kg
Gold medal – first place	2023 Zagreb	76 kg
Gold medal – first place	2024 Bucharest	76 kg
Silver medal – second place	2020 Rome	76 kg
Silver medal – second place	2025 Bratislava	76 kg
Individual World Cup
Silver medal – second place	2020 Belgrade	76 kg
Islamic Solidarity Games
Gold medal – first place	2017 Baku	75 kg
Mediterranean Games
Gold medal – first place	2013 Mersin	72 kg
Gold medal – first place	2022 Oran	76 kg
Yasar Dogu Tournament
Gold medal – first place	2016 Istanbul	75 kg
Gold medal – first place	2017 Istanbul	75 kg
Gold medal – first place	2020 Istanbul	76 kg
Silver medal – second place	2018 Istanbul	76 kg
Bronze medal – third place	2012 Ankara	72 kg
Bronze medal – third place	2019 Istanbul	76 kg
Dan Kolov - Nikola Petrov Tournament
Gold medal – first place	2017 Ruse	75 kg
Gold medal – first place	2019 Ruse	76 kg
Gold medal – first place	2023 Sofia	76 kg
Silver medal – second place	2013 Plovdiv	72 kg
Silver medal – second place	2015 Sofia	75 kg
Poland Open
Gold medal – first place	2015 Warsaw	75 kg
Gold medal – first place	2020 Warsaw	76 kg

Yasemin Adar Yiğit (born 6 December 1991) is a Turkish retired freestyle wrestler competing in the 76 kg division. She is a two time world (2017, 2022) and seven time European (2016, 2017, 2018, 2019, 2022, 2023 and 2024) champion. She also won one of the bronze medals in the women's 76 kg event at the 2020 Summer Olympics.

== Personal life ==
Adar was born to Naim Adar, a baker, and Ayşegül in Balıkesir, Turkey on 6 December 1991. She has an elder sister, Yıldız. Her mother died in 2013. After finishing Gaziosmanpaşa High School, she studied physical education and sports in Balıkesir University. Currently, she works as a teacher in Niğde. On September 26, 2021, she married Erdem Yiğit.

== Sports career ==
Adar was discovered by former Turkish champion sport wrestler Aslan Seyhanlı while she was performing shot put during her high school and university years. She then switched over to wrestling in her hometown. She competes for Trakya Birlik SK.

Adar took part in the freestyle −72 kg event at the 2012 World Championships in Strathcona County, Alberta, Canada, gaining no success.

She participated at the 2013 European Championships in Tbilisi, Georgia, without having success. At the 2013 Mediterranean Games in Mersin, Turkey, she became gold medalist in the −72 kg division. She placed fifth at the 2013 World Championships held in Budapest, Hungary, after losing to Chinese Zhang Fengliu in the semifinals and to American Adeline Gray in the third place match.

Adar reached the round of 16 at the 2014 World Championships in Tashkent, Uzbekistan.

She failed to advance to the finals after losing to Russian Ekaterina Bukina in the −75 kg event at the 2015 European Games in Baku, Azerbaijan. She then lost to Moldavian Svetlana Saenko in the bronze medal match. At the 2015 World Championships in Las Vegas, United States, Adar lost in the quarter-finals to Colombian Andrea Olaya by fall.

Competing in the −75 kg event at the 2016 European Championships held in Riga, Latvia, she won her country's first-ever women's wrestling gold medal at this championship, defeating Russian Alena Storodubtseva.

In 2020, she won the silver medal in the women's 76 kg event at the 2020 Individual Wrestling World Cup held in Belgrade, Serbia. In March 2021, she competed at the European Qualification Tournament in Budapest, Hungary hoping to qualify for the 2020 Summer Olympics in Tokyo, Japan. She was eliminated in her second match by Martina Kuenz of Austria. In May 2021, she qualified at the World Olympic Qualification Tournament to represent Turkey at the 2020 Summer Olympics.

She won the gold medal in the women's 76 kg event at the 2022 European Wrestling Championships held in Budapest, Hungary. A few months later, she won the gold medal in the 76 kg event at the 2022 Mediterranean Games held in Oran, Algeria. Yasemin Adar beat Egypt’s Samar Amer 6-0 in women's freestyle 76 kg at the 2022 World Wrestling Championships in Belgrade, Serbia, scoring her second gold in the tournament.

In 2023, Yasemin Adar won the gold medal in the women's freestyle 76 category at the 2023 European Wrestling Championships in Zagreb. Yasemin Adar won the quarterfinal against Romanian Catalina Axente with a 10-0 with technical superiority. Then, in the semifinals, she won 14-4 with technical superiority against Ukrainian Anastasia Osniach and reached the final. Yasemin Adar competed against Austrian Martina Kuenz in the final. While the competitive match ended 2-2, Adar won the match with advantage points and became the European champion for the 6th time.

She won the gold medal in the 76 kg event at the 2024 European Wrestling Championships held in Bucharest, Romania. She defeated Anastasiia Osniach of Ukraine in her gold medal match. She competed at the 2024 European Wrestling Olympic Qualification Tournament in Baku, Azerbaijan and she earned a quota place for Turkey for the 2024 Summer Olympics in Paris, France.

She competed in the women's 76 kg event at the Olympics. She defeated Canadian Justina Di Stasio 8-2 in the first round of the women's freestyle 76 kg wrestling competition at the 2020 Summer Olympics at the Grand Palais Éphémère in Paris, France. She lost 3-0 to Japanese Yuka Kagami in the quarterfinals. He qualified for the repechage when his opponent reached the final. She lost 3-1 to Ecuadorian Génesis Reasco in the repechage match and finished eighth in the Olympics.

In 2025, Adar won the silver medal in the 76 kg event at the European Wrestling Championships held in Bratislava, Slovakia. After bypassing the first round she reached the final by pinning Italian Enrica Rinaldi in the quarterfinals with a 4-0 lead and defeating Austrian Martina Kuenz 2-1 in the semifinals. She lost 6-0 to Ukrainian Anastasiya Alpyeyeva in the final match and won the silver medal. After the final match, she took off her shoes on the mat and ended her active wrestling career at the age of 33.

== Achievements ==
Year	Tournament	Venue	Result	Event
2012	European Championships	Belgrade, Serbia	15th	Freestyle 72 kg
2012	Mediterranean Championships	Larissa, Greece	1st	Freestyle 72 kg
2012	World Championships	Strathcona County, Canada	5th	Freestyle 72 kg
2013	European Championships	(Georgia (country)) Tbilisi, Georgia	10th	Freestyle 72 kg
2013	Mediterranean Games	Mersin, Turkey	1st	Freestyle 72 kg
2013	World Championships	Budapest, Hungary	5th	Freestyle 72 kg
2014	European Championships	Vantaa, Finland	9th	Freestyle 75 kg
2014	World Championships	Tashkent, Uzbekistan	9th	Freestyle 75 kg
2015	European Games	Baku, Azerbaijan	5th	Freestyle 75 kg
2015	World Championships	Las Vegas, United States	10th	Freestyle 75 kg
2016	European Championships	Riga, Latvia	1st	Freestyle 75 kg
2016	Olympic Games	Rio de Janeiro, Brazil	8th	Freestyle 75 kg
2017	European Championships	Novi Sad, Serbia	1st	Freestyle 75 kg
2017	Islamic Solidarity Games	Baku, Azerbaijan	1st	Freestyle 75 kg
2017	World Championships	Paris, France	1st	Freestyle 75 kg
2018	European Championships	Kaspiysk, Russia	1st	Freestyle 76 kg
2018	World Championships	Budapest, Hungary	2nd	Freestyle 76 kg
2019	European Championships	Bucharest, Romania	1st	Freestyle 76 kg
2020	European Championships	Rome, Italy	2nd	Freestyle 76 kg
2021	Summer Olympics	Tokyo, Japan	3rd	Freestyle 76 kg
2022	European Championships	Budapest, Hungary	1st	Freestyle 76 kg
2022	Mediterranean Games	Oran, Algeria	1st	Freestyle 76 kg
2022	World Championships	Belgrade, Serbia	1st	Freestyle 76 kg
2023	European Championships	Zagreb, Croatia	1st	Freestyle 76 kg
2024	European Championships	Bucharest, Romania	1st	Freestyle 76 kg
2024	Olympic Games	Paris, France	8th	Freestyle 76 kg
2025	European Championships	Bratislava, Slovakia	2nd	Freestyle 76 kg

== Filmography ==
=== Web shows ===
Year	Title	Role	Notes	Ref.
2025	Physical: Asia	Contestant	Team Turkey	
