= Zsanett Németh =

Hungarian wrestler (1994–2026)

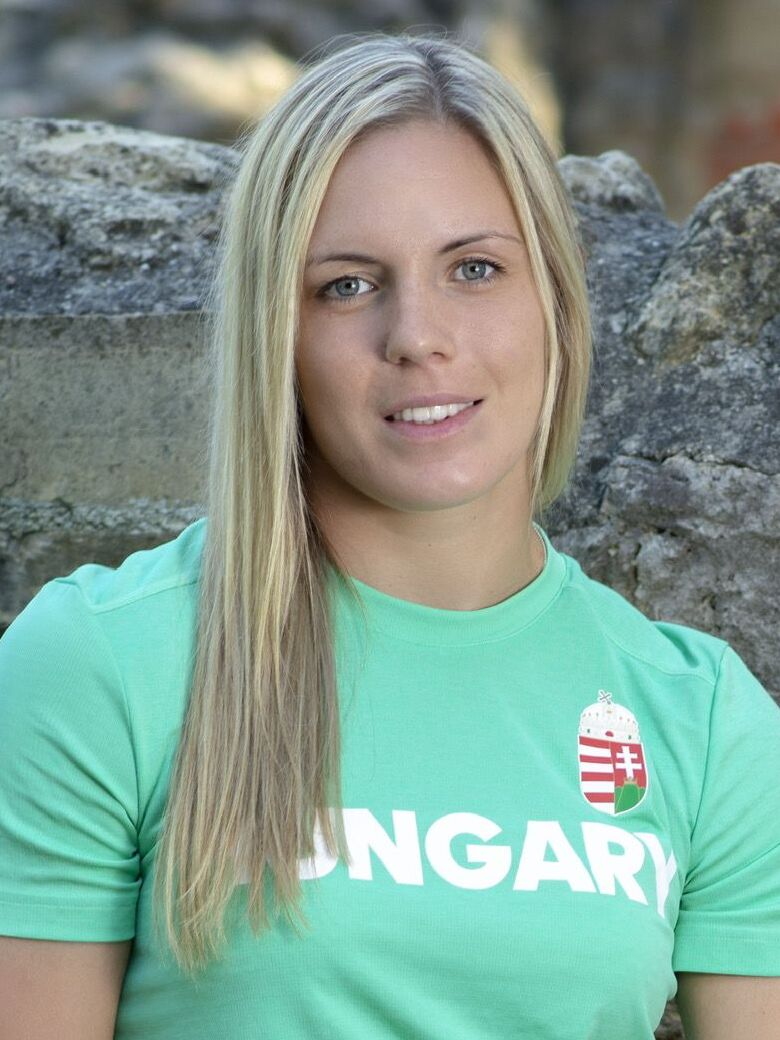
- Németh in 2019

Personal information
- Nationality: Hungarian
- Born: 21 January 1994 Veszprém, Hungary
- Died: 23 June 2026 (aged 32) Sofia, Bulgaria
- Height: 1.75 m (5 ft 9 in)
- Weight: 80 kg (176 lb)

Sport
- Country: Hungary
- Sport: Wrestling
- Club: Újpesti Torna Egylet
Medal record
Women's freestyle wrestling
Representing Hungary
European Championships
Silver medal – second place	2017 Novi Sad	75 kg
Bronze medal – third place	2019 Bucharest	76 kg

Zsanett Németh (21 January 1994 – 23 June 2026) was a Hungarian wrestler. She participated at the 2010 Summer Youth Olympics in Singapore. She represented her country at the 2016 Summer Olympics held in Rio de Janeiro, Brazil. She won a silver medal at the 2017 European Wrestling Championships held in Novi Sad, Serbia.

== Biography ==
Zsanett Németh was born in Veszprém, Hungary on 21 January 1994.

In March 2021, she competed at the European Qualification Tournament in Budapest, Hungary hoping to qualify for the 2020 Summer Olympics in Tokyo, Japan. In April 2021, she was eliminated in her first match in the 76 kg event at the 2021 European Wrestling Championships in Warsaw, Poland. In May 2021, she failed to qualify for the Olympics at the World Olympic Qualification Tournament held in Sofia, Bulgaria. She won her first match against Iselin Moen Solheim of Norway but she was then eliminated in her next match by Martina Kuenz of Austria.

Németh died on 23 June 2026, at the age of 32, after falling from her eleventh-floor apartment in Sofia, in a suspected suicide by jumping.

== Major results ==
Year	Tournament	Venue	Result	Event
2010	Youth Olympic Games	Singapore, Singapore	7th	Freestyle 70 kg
2013	World Championships	Budapest, Hungary	16th	Freestyle 72 kg
2014	European Championships	Vantaa, Finland	5th	Freestyle 75 kg
2014	World Championships	Tashkent, Uzbekistan	15th	Freestyle 75 kg
2015	European Games	Baku, Azerbaijan	8th	Freestyle 75 kg
2015	World Championships	Las Vegas, United States	21st	Freestyle 75 kg
2016	European Championships	Riga, Latvia	9th	Freestyle 75 kg
2016	Olympic Games	Rio de Janeiro, Brazil	10th	Freestyle 75 kg
2017	European Championships	Novi Sad, Serbia	2nd	Freestyle 75 kg
2017	World Championships	Paris, France	12th	Freestyle 75 kg
2018	European Championships	Kaspiysk, Russia	7th	Freestyle 76 kg
2018	World Championships	Budapest, Hungary	5th	Freestyle 76 kg
2019	European Championships	Bucharest, Romania	3rd	Freestyle 76 kg
2019	European Games	Minsk, Belarus	13th	Freestyle 76 kg
2019	World Championships	Nur-Sultan, Kazakhstan	24th	Freestyle 76 kg
2019	World Beach Games	Doha, Qatar	2nd	Beach wrestling +70 kg
2020	European Championships	Rome, Italy	12th	Freestyle 76 kg
2021	European Championships	Warsaw, Poland	9th	Freestyle 76 kg
