= Sabira Aliyeva =

Azerbaijani freestyle wrestler (born 1995)

- Aliyeva in 2017

Personal information
- Born: 25 September 1995 (age 30) Baku, Azerbaijan
- Height: 170 cm (5 ft 7 in)

Sport
- Country: Azerbaijan
- Sport: Amateur wrestling
- Event: Freestyle
Medal record
Women's freestyle wrestling
Representing Azerbaijan
European Championships
Bronze medal – third place	2018 Kaspiysk	76 kg
Islamic Solidarity Games
Silver medal – second place	2017 Baku	75 kg
World Junior Championships
Bronze medal – third place	2013 Sofia	72 kg
Gold medal – first place	2014 Zagreb	72 kg
Silver medal – second place	2015 Salvador da Bahia	72 kg
European Junior Championships
Gold medal – first place	2013 Skopje	72 kg
Gold medal – first place	2015 Istanbul	72 kg

Sabira Aliyeva (born 25 September 1995) is an Azerbaijani freestyle wrestler. She won one of the bronze medals in the 76 kg event at the 2018 European Wrestling Championships held in Kaspiysk, Russia.

== Career ==
In 2019, she competed in the women's freestyle 76 kg event at the European Games held in Minsk, Belarus. She lost her bronze medal match against Iselin Moen Solheim of Norway.

In 2021, she lost her bronze medal match in the 76 kg event at the European Wrestling Championships in Warsaw, Poland.

== Achievements ==
Year	Tournament	Location	Result	Event
2017	Islamic Solidarity Games	Baku, Azerbaijan	2nd	Freestyle 75 kg
2018	European Championships	Kaspiysk, Russia	3rd	Freestyle 76 kg
