= Vasilisa Marzaliuk =

Belarusian wrestler (born 1987)

Personal information
- Native name: Васіліса Аляксандраўна Марзалюк
- Full name: Vasilisa Aliaksandraŭna Marzaliuk
- Born: 23 June 1987 (age 39) Lahojsk, Minsk Region
Medal record
Women's freestyle wrestling
Representing Belarus
World Championships
Bronze medal – third place	2011 Istanbul	72 kg
Bronze medal – third place	2012 Strathcona County	72 kg
Bronze medal – third place	2015 Las Vegas	75 kg
Silver medal – second place	2017 Paris	75 kg
European Games
Gold medal – first place	2015 Baku	75 kg
Gold medal – first place	2019 Minsk	76 kg
European Championships
Silver medal – second place	2011 Dortmund	72 kg
Bronze medal – third place	2005 Varna	72 kg
Bronze medal – third place	2013 Tbilisi	72 kg
Bronze medal – third place	2016 Riga	75 kg
Individual World Cup
Bronze medal – third place	2020 Belgrade	76 kg
Golden Grand Prix Ivan Yarygin
Silver medal – second place	2019 Krasnoyarsk	76 kg

Vasilisa Aliaksandraŭna Marzaliuk (Belarusian: Васіліса Аляксандраўна Марзалюк; born 23 June 1987) is a Belarusian wrestler. She is a three-time World bronze medalist and the 2011 European silver medalist. In June 2015, she represented Belarus at the inaugural European Games, winning gold in the women's freestyle 75 kg.

Marzaliuk appeared in the 72 kg category at the 2012 Summer Olympics, losing the bronze medal match to Spain's Maider Unda. She competed in women's freestyle 75 kg at the 2016 Summer Olympics in Rio de Janeiro. In the bronze medal match, she lost to China's Zhang Fengliu.

In 2020, she won one of the bronze medals in the women's 76 kg event at the Individual Wrestling World Cup held in Belgrade, Serbia. In March 2021, she qualified at the European Qualification Tournament to compete at the 2020 Summer Olympics in Tokyo, Japan. In April 2021, she competed in the 76 kg event at the European Wrestling Championships in Warsaw, Poland.
