= Maria Selmaier =

German freestyle wrestler

Personal information
- Nationality: German
- Born: 12 December 1991 (age 34)
- Height: 1.75 m (5 ft 9 in)
- Weight: 79 kg (174 lb)

Sport
- Country: Germany
- Sport: Wrestling
Medal record
European Championships
Silver medal – second place	2020 Rome	72 kg

Maria Selmaier (born 12 December 1991) is a German wrestler. She represented her country at the 2016 Summer Olympics. She finished in 18th place in the women's freestyle 75 kg division.

She qualified for the 2016 Summer Olympics at the second Olympic Qualification Tournament held in Istanbul, Turkey.
