= Wrestling at the 2020 Summer Olympics – Qualification =

This article details the qualifying phase for wrestling at the 2020 Summer Olympics (postponed to 2021 due to the COVID-19 pandemic). The competition at these Games comprised a total of 289 athletes coming from the different nations; each had been allowed to enter a maximum of 18 (1 per event).

Two places had been reserved for the host nation, Japan. Each NOC could only send one wrestler per weight class.

Quota places are allocated to the respective NOC and not to competitor that achieved the place in the qualification event.

== Timeline ==
| Event | Date | Venue |
|---|---|---|
| 2019 World Championships | September 14–22, 2019 | Nur-Sultan, Kazakhstan |
| Pan American Qualification Tournament | March 13–15, 2020 | Ottawa, Canada |
| European Qualification Tournament | March 18–21, 2021 | Budapest, Hungary |
| African & Oceania Qualification Tournament | April 2–4, 2021 | Hammamet, Tunisia |
| Asian Qualification Tournament | April 9–11, 2021 | Almaty, Kazakhstan |
| World Qualification Tournament | May 6–9, 2021 | Sofia, Bulgaria |

== Qualification summary ==
| NOC | Men's freestyle | | | | | | Men's Greco-Roman | | | | | | Women's freestyle | | | | | | Total |
| NOC | 57 | 65 | 74 | 86 | 97 | 125 | 60 | 67 | 77 | 87 | 97 | 130 | 50 | 53 | 57 | 62 | 68 | 76 | Total |
|---|---|---|---|---|---|---|---|---|---|---|---|---|---|---|---|---|---|---|---|
| Algeria | Yes | | | Yes | Yes | Yes | Yes | Yes | | Yes | Yes | | | | | | | | 8 |
| Argentina | | Yes | | | | | | | | | | | | | | | | | 1 |
| Armenia | Yes | Yes | | | | | Yes | Yes | Yes | | Yes | | | | | | | | 6 |
| Azerbaijan | | Yes | Yes | | Yes | | | | Yes | Yes | | | Yes | | | | Yes | | 7 |
| Belarus | | | Yes | Yes | Yes | Yes | | | | Yes | | | | Yes | Yes | | | Yes | 8 |
| Brazil | | | | | | | | | | | | Yes | | | | Yes | | Yes | 3 |
| Bulgaria | Yes | | | | | | | | Yes | | Yes | | Yes | | Yes | Yes | Yes | | 7 |
| Cameroon | | | | | | | | | | | | | | Yes | | | | | 1 |
| Canada | | | | | Yes | Yes | | | | | | | | | | | Yes | Yes | 4 |
| Chile | | | | | | | | | | | | Yes | | | | | | | 1 |
| China | Yes | | | Yes | | Yes | Yes | | | Yes | | | Yes | Yes | Yes | Yes | Yes | Yes | 11 |
| Colombia | Yes | | | Yes | | | | Yes | | | | | | | | | | | 3 |
| Croatia | | | | | | | | | Yes | Yes | | | | | | | | | 2 |
| Cuba | | Yes | Yes | | Yes | | Yes | Yes | Yes | Yes | Yes | Yes | Yes | Yes | | | Yes | | 12 |
| Czech Republic | | | | | | | | | | | Yes | | | | | | | | 1 |
| Denmark | | | | | | | | Yes | | | | | | | | | | | 1 |
| Ecuador | | | | | | | | | | | | | Yes | Yes | | | | | 2 |
| Egypt | | | Yes | | | Yes | Yes | Yes | | Yes | | Yes | | | | | Yes | Yes | 8 |
| Estonia | | | | | | | | | | | | Yes | | | | | | Yes | 2 |
| Finland | | | | | | | | | | | Yes | Yes | | | | | | | 2 |
| France | | | | | | | | | | | | | | | Yes | | Yes | | 2 |
| Georgia | | | Yes | | Yes | Yes | | Yes | | Yes | Yes | Yes | | | | | | | 7 |
| Germany | | | | | | Yes | Yes | Yes | | Yes | | Yes | | | | | Yes | Yes | 7 |
| Greece | | Yes | | | | | | | | | | | | Yes | | | | | 2 |
| Guam | | | | | | | | | | | | | | Yes | | | | | 1 |
| Guinea | | | | | | | | | | | | | | | Yes | | | | 1 |
| Guinea-Bissau | Yes | | Yes | | | | | | | | | | | | | | | | 2 |
| Hungary | | Yes | | | | | | Yes | Yes | Yes | Yes | | | | | Yes | | | 6 |
| India | Yes | Yes | | Yes | | | | | | | | | Yes | Yes | Yes | Yes | | | 7 |
| Iran | Yes | Yes | Yes | Yes | Yes | Yes | Yes | Yes | Yes | | Yes | Yes | | | | | | | 11 |
| Italy | | | Yes | | Yes | | | | | | | | | | | | | | 2 |
| Japan | Yes | Yes | Yes | Yes | | | Yes | | Yes | | | | Yes | Yes | Yes | Yes | Yes | Yes | 12 |
| Kazakhstan | Yes | Yes | Yes | | Yes | Yes | Yes | | Yes | Yes | | | Yes | Yes | | | | Yes | 11 |
| Kosovo | | | | | | Yes | | | | | | | | | | | | | 1 |
| Kyrgyzstan | | Yes | | | | Yes | Yes | | Yes | Yes | Yes | | | | | Yes | Yes | Yes | 9 |
| Latvia | | | | | | | | | | | | | | | | Yes | | | 1 |
| Lithuania | | | | | | | | | | | | Yes | | | | | | | 1 |
| Mexico | | | | | | | | | Yes | | | | | | Yes | | | | 2 |
| Moldova | | | | | | | Yes | | | | | | | | Yes | | | | 2 |
| Mongolia | Yes | Yes | | | | Yes | | | | | | | Yes | Yes | Yes | Yes | Yes | Yes | 9 |
| Morocco | | | | | | | | | Yes | | | | | | | | | | 1 |
| Nigeria | | | | Yes | | | | | | | | | Yes | | Yes | Yes | Yes | | 5 |
| North Macedonia | | | | | Yes | | | | | | | | | | | | | | 1 |
| Peru | | | | Yes | | | | | | | | | | | | | | | 1 |
| Poland | | Yes | Yes | | | | | | | | Yes | | | Yes | Yes | | Yes | | 6 |
| Puerto Rico | | | Yes | | | | | | | | | | | | | | | | 1 |
| Refugee Olympic Team | | | | | | | | Yes | | | | | | | | | | | 1 |
| ROC | Yes | Yes | Yes | Yes | Yes | Yes | Yes | Yes | Yes | | Yes | Yes | Yes | Yes | Yes | Yes | Yes | Yes | 17 |
| Romania | | | | | Yes | | | | | | | Yes | Yes | Yes | | Yes | | | 5 |
| San Marino | | | | Yes | | | | | | | | | | | | | | | 1 |
| Senegal | | Yes | | | | | | | | | | | | | | | | | 1 |
| Serbia | Yes | | | | | | | Yes | | Yes | Yes | | | | | | | | 4 |
| Slovakia | | | | Yes | | | | | | | | | | | | | | | 1 |
| South Korea | | | | | | | | Yes | | | | Yes | | | | | | | 2 |
| Sweden | | | | | | | | | Yes | | | | | Yes | | Yes | | | 3 |
| Switzerland | | | | Yes | | | | | | | | | | | | | | | 1 |
| Tunisia | | Yes | | | Yes | | | Yes | Yes | | Yes | Yes | Yes | | Yes | Yes | | Yes | 10 |
| Turkey | Yes | | | Yes | Yes | Yes | Yes | | | | Yes | Yes | Yes | | | | | Yes | 9 |
| Ukraine | | | Yes | | | Yes | Yes | Yes | | Yes | | | Yes | | Yes | Yes | Yes | Yes | 10 |
| United States | Yes | | Yes | Yes | Yes | Yes | Yes | Yes | | Yes | Yes | | Yes | Yes | Yes | Yes | Yes | Yes | 15 |
| Uzbekistan | Yes | | Yes | Yes | Yes | | Yes | | Yes | Yes | | Yes | | | | | | | 8 |
| Total: 61 NOCs | 16 | 16 | 16 | 16 | 16 | 16 | 16 | 17 | 16 | 16 | 16 | 16 | 16 | 16 | 16 | 16 | 16 | 16 | 289 |

== Men's freestyle events ==
=== 57 kg ===
| Competition | Places | Qualified wrestlers |
|---|---|---|
| 2019 World Championships | 6 | Zaur Uguev (ROC); Süleyman Atlı (TUR); Nurislam Sanayev (KAZ); Ravi Kumar Dahiya (IND); Stevan Mićić (SRB); Reza Atri (IRI) |
| Pan American Qualification Tournament | 2 | Thomas Gilman (USA); Óscar Tigreros (COL) |
| European Qualification Tournament | 2 | Arsen Harutyunyan (ARM); Georgi Vangelov (BUL) |
| African & Oceania Qualification Tournament | 2 | Diamantino Iuna Fafé (GBS); Abdelhak Kherbache (ALG) |
| Asian Qualification Tournament | 2 | Gulomjon Abdullaev (UZB); Liu Minghu (CHN) |
| World Qualification Tournament | 2 | Yuki Takahashi (JPN); Erdenebatyn Bekhbayar (MGL) |
| Total | 16 | |

=== 65 kg ===
| Competition | Places | Qualified wrestlers |
|---|---|---|
| 2019 World Championships | 6 | Gadzhimurad Rashidov (ROC); Daulet Niyazbekov (KAZ); Bajrang Punia (IND); Iszmail Muszukajev (HUN); Tömör-Ochiryn Tulga (MGL); Takuto Otoguro (JPN) |
| Pan American Qualification Tournament | 2 | Alejandro Valdés (CUB); Agustín Destribats (ARG) |
| European Qualification Tournament | 2 | Vazgen Tevanyan (ARM); Haji Aliyev (AZE) |
| African & Oceania Qualification Tournament | 2 | Adama Diatta (SEN); Haithem Dakhlaoui (TUN) |
| Asian Qualification Tournament | 2 | Ernazar Akmataliev (KGZ); Amir Mohammad Yazdani (IRI) |
| World Qualification Tournament | 2 | Magomedmurad Gadzhiev (POL); Georgios Pilidis (GRE) |
| Total | 16 | |

=== 74 kg ===
| Competition | Places | Qualified wrestlers |
|---|---|---|
| 2019 World Championships | 6 | Zaurbek Sidakov (ROC); Frank Chamizo (ITA); Jordan Burroughs (USA); Daniyar Kaisanov (KAZ); Mao Okui (JPN); Kamil Rybicki (POL) (Note: France's Zelimkhan Khadjiev originally earned a quota place at the 2019 World Championships, but tested positive for doping, giving his nation's Olympic license to Poland.) |
| Pan American Qualification Tournament | 2 | Geandry Garzón (CUB); Franklin Gómez (PUR) |
| European Qualification Tournament | 2 | Avtandil Kentchadze (GEO); Khadzhimurad Gadzhiyev (AZE) |
| African & Oceania Qualification Tournament | 2 | Amr Reda Hussen (EGY); Augusto Midana (GBS) |
| Asian Qualification Tournament | 2 | Younes Emami (IRI); Bekzod Abdurakhmonov (UZB) |
| World Qualification Tournament | 2 | Mahamedkhabib Kadzimahamedau (BLR); Vasyl Mykhailov (UKR) |
| Total | 16 | |

=== 86 kg ===
| Competition | Places | Qualified wrestlers |
|---|---|---|
| 2019 World Championships | 6 | Hassan Yazdani (IRI); Deepak Punia (IND); Stefan Reichmuth (SUI); Artur Naifonov (ROC); Carlos Izquierdo (COL); Myles Amine (SMR) |
| Pan American Qualification Tournament | 2 | David Taylor (USA); Pool Ambrocio (PER) |
| European Qualification Tournament | 2 | Ali Shabanau (BLR); Osman Göçen (TUR) |
| African & Oceania Qualification Tournament | 2 | Ekerekeme Agiomor (NGR); Fateh Benferdjallah (ALG) |
| Asian Qualification Tournament | 2 | Javrail Shapiev (UZB); Lin Zushen (CHN) |
| World Qualification Tournament | 2 | Sosuke Takatani (JPN); Boris Makoev (SVK) |
| Total | 16 | |

=== 97 kg ===
| Competition | Places | Qualified wrestlers |
|---|---|---|
| 2019 World Championships | 6 | Abdulrashid Sadulaev (ROC); Sharif Sharifov (AZE); Kyle Snyder (USA); Magomedgaji Nurov (MKD); Elizbar Odikadze (GEO); Alisher Yergali (KAZ) |
| Pan American Qualification Tournament | 2 | Reineris Salas (CUB); Jordan Steen (CAN) |
| European Qualification Tournament | 2 | Aliaksandr Hushtyn (BLR); Süleyman Karadeniz (TUR) |
| African & Oceania Qualification Tournament | 2 | Mohamed Saadaoui (TUN); Mohammed Fardj (ALG) |
| Asian Qualification Tournament | 2 | Mohammad Hossein Mohammadian (IRI); Magomed Ibragimov (UZB) |
| World Qualification Tournament | 2 | Abraham Conyedo (ITA); Albert Saritov (ROU) |
| Total | 16 | |

=== 125 kg ===
| Competition | Places | Qualified wrestlers |
|---|---|---|
| 2019 World Championships | 6 | Geno Petriashvili (GEO); Taha Akgül (TUR); Oleksandr Khotsianivskyi (UKR); Deng Zhiwei (CHN); Egzon Shala (KOS) (Note: Khasanboy Rakhimov from Uzbekistan and Badzha Khutaba from Syria originally earned quota places at the 2019 World Championships, but both wrestlers tested positive for doping, giving Olympic licenses to Kosovo and Iran.); Yadollah Mohebbi (IRI) |
| Pan American Qualification Tournament | 2 | Nick Gwiazdowski (USA); Amar Dhesi (CAN) |
| European Qualification Tournament | 2 | Dzianis Khramiankou (BLR); Gennadij Cudinovic (GER) |
| African & Oceania Qualification Tournament | 2 | Diaaeldin Kamal (EGY); Djahid Berrahal (ALG) |
| Asian Qualification Tournament | 2 | Yusup Batirmurzaev (KAZ); Mönkhtöriin Lkhagvagerel (MGL) |
| World Qualification Tournament | 2 | Sergey Kozyrev (ROC); Aiaal Lazarev (KGZ) (Note: Sumit Malik of India originally earned a quota place at the World Qualification Tournament, but he got disqualified for failing the doping test. The Olympic license was transferred to Kyrgyzstan.) |
| Total | 16 | |

== Men's Greco-Roman events ==
=== 60 kg ===
| Competition | Places | Qualified wrestlers |
|---|---|---|
| 2019 World Championships | 6 | Kenichiro Fumita (JPN); Sergey Emelin (ROC); Meirambek Ainagulov (KAZ); Alireza Nejati (IRI); Lenur Temirov (UKR); Elmurat Tasmuradov (UZB) |
| Pan American Qualification Tournament | 2 | Luis Orta (CUB); Ildar Hafizov (USA) |
| European Qualification Tournament | 2 | Kerem Kamal (TUR); Etienne Kinsinger (GER) |
| African & Oceania Qualification Tournament | 2 | Haithem Mahmoud (EGY); Abdelkarim Fergat (ALG) |
| Asian Qualification Tournament | 2 | Zholaman Sharshenbekov (KGZ); Walihan Sailike (CHN) |
| World Qualification Tournament | 2 | Victor Ciobanu (MDA); Armen Melikyan (ARM) |
| Total | 16 | |

=== 67 kg ===
| Competition | Places | Qualified wrestlers |
|---|---|---|
| 2019 World Championships | 6 | Ismael Borrero (CUB); Artem Surkov (ROC); Mate Nemeš (SRB); Frank Stäbler (GER); Fredrik Bjerrehuus (DEN); Mohamed Ibrahim El-Sayed (EGY) |
| Pan American Qualification Tournament | 2 | Julián Horta (COL); Alejandro Sancho (USA) |
| European Qualification Tournament | 2 | Ramaz Zoidze (GEO); Bálint Korpási (HUN) |
| African & Oceania Qualification Tournament | 2 | Souleymen Nasr (TUN); Abdelmalek Merabet (ALG) |
| Asian Qualification Tournament | 2 | Mohammad Reza Geraei (IRI); Ryu Han-su (KOR) |
| World Qualification Tournament | 2 | Karen Aslanyan (ARM); Parviz Nasibov (UKR) |
| Special Invitation | 1 | Aker Al-Obaidi (EOR) |
| Total | 17 | |

=== 77 kg ===
| Competition | Places | Qualified wrestlers |
|---|---|---|
| 2019 World Championships | 6 | Tamás Lőrincz (HUN); Alex Kessidis (SWE); Mohammad Ali Geraei (IRI); Jalgasbay Berdimuratov (UZB); Karapet Chalyan (ARM); Askhat Dilmukhamedov (KAZ) |
| Pan American Qualification Tournament | 2 | Yosvanys Peña (CUB); José Andrés Vargas (MEX) |
| European Qualification Tournament | 2 | Aleksandr Chekhirkin (ROC); Božo Starčević (CRO) |
| African & Oceania Qualification Tournament | 2 | Lamjed Maafi (TUN); Zied Ayet Ikram (MAR) |
| Asian Qualification Tournament | 2 | Akzhol Makhmudov (KGZ); Shohei Yabiku (JPN) |
| World Qualification Tournament | 2 | Aik Mnatsakanian (BUL); Rafig Huseynov (AZE) |
| Total | 16 | |

=== 87 kg ===
| Competition | Places | Qualified wrestlers |
|---|---|---|
| 2019 World Championships | 6 | Zhan Beleniuk (UKR); Viktor Lőrincz (HUN); Denis Kudla (GER); Rustam Assakalov (UZB); Mikalai Stadub (BLR); Atabek Azisbekov (KGZ) |
| Pan American Qualification Tournament | 2 | Joe Rau (USA); Daniel Grégorich (CUB) |
| European Qualification Tournament | 2 | Islam Abbasov (AZE); Lasha Gobadze (GEO) |
| African & Oceania Qualification Tournament | 2 | Mohamed Metwally (EGY); Bachir Sid Azara (ALG) |
| Asian Qualification Tournament | 2 | Nursultan Tursynov (KAZ); Peng Fei (CHN) |
| World Qualification Tournament | 2 | Ivan Huklek (CRO); Zurabi Datunashvili (SRB) |
| Total | 16 | |

=== 97 kg ===
| Competition | Places | Qualified wrestlers |
|---|---|---|
| 2019 World Championships | 6 | Musa Evloev (ROC); Artur Aleksanyan (ARM); Mikheil Kajaia (SRB); Cenk İldem (TUR); Tadeusz Michalik (POL); Giorgi Melia (GEO) |
| Pan American Qualification Tournament | 2 | Gabriel Rosillo (CUB); G'Angelo Hancock (USA) |
| European Qualification Tournament | 2 | Arvi Savolainen (FIN); Kiril Milov (BUL) |
| African & Oceania Qualification Tournament | 2 | Adem Boudjemline (ALG); Haykel Achouri (TUN) |
| Asian Qualification Tournament | 2 | Mohammad Hadi Saravi (IRI); Uzur Dzhuzupbekov (KGZ) |
| World Qualification Tournament | 2 | Alex Szőke (HUN); Artur Omarov (CZE) |
| Total | 16 | |

=== 130 kg ===
| Competition | Places | Qualified wrestlers |
|---|---|---|
| 2019 World Championships | 6 | Rıza Kayaalp (TUR); Óscar Pino (CUB); Heiki Nabi (EST); Iakobi Kajaia (GEO); Amir Ghasemi Monjazi (IRI); Eduard Popp (GER) |
| Pan American Qualification Tournament | 2 | Yasmani Acosta (CHI); Eduard Soghomonyan (BRA) |
| European Qualification Tournament | 2 | Sergey Semenov (ROC); Mantas Knystautas (LTU) |
| African & Oceania Qualification Tournament | 2 | Abdellatif Mohamed (EGY); Amine Guennichi (TUN) |
| Asian Qualification Tournament | 2 | Muminjon Abdullaev (UZB); Kim Min-seok (KOR) |
| World Qualification Tournament | 2 | Alin Alexuc-Ciurariu (ROU); Elias Kuosmanen (FIN) |
| Total | 16 | |

== Women's freestyle events ==
=== 50 kg ===
| Competition | Places | Qualified wrestlers |
|---|---|---|
| 2019 World Championships | 6 | Mariya Stadnik (AZE); Alina Vuc (ROU); Valentina Islamova (KAZ); Ekaterina Poleshchuk (ROC); Oksana Livach (UKR); Sun Yanan (CHN) |
| Pan American Qualification Tournament | 2 | Yusneylys Guzmán (CUB); Sarah Hildebrandt (USA) |
| European Qualification Tournament | 2 | Miglena Selishka (BUL); Evin Demirhan (TUR) |
| African & Oceania Qualification Tournament | 2 | Sarra Hamdi (TUN); Adijat Idris (NGR) |
| Asian Qualification Tournament | 2 | Yui Susaki (JPN); Tsogt-Ochiryn Namuuntsetseg (MGL) |
| World Qualification Tournament | 2 | Seema Bisla (IND); Lucía Yépez (ECU) |
| Total | 16 | |

=== 53 kg ===
| Competition | Places | Qualified wrestlers |
|---|---|---|
| 2019 World Championships | 6 | Mayu Mukaida (JPN); Vinesh Phogat (IND); Pang Qianyu (CHN); Maria Prevolaraki (GRE); Roksana Zasina (POL); Luisa Valverde (ECU) (Note: North Korea's Pak Yong-mi originally earned a quota place at the 2019 World Championships, But North Korea withdrew from the Olympics, Her spot has been replaced by the next best-ranked wrestler from the 2019 World Championships.) |
| Pan American Qualification Tournament | 2 | Lianna Montero (CUB); Jacarra Winchester (USA) |
| European Qualification Tournament | 2 | Sofia Mattsson (SWE); Vanesa Kaladzinskaya (BLR) |
| African & Oceania Qualification Tournament | 2 | Joseph Essombe (CMR); Rckaela Aquino (GUM) |
| Asian Qualification Tournament | 2 | Bat-Ochiryn Bolortuyaa (MGL); Tatyana Akhmetova-Amanzhol (KAZ) |
| World Qualification Tournament | 2 | Olga Khoroshavtseva (ROC); Andreea Ana (ROU) |
| Total | 16 | |

=== 57 kg ===
| Competition | Places | Qualified wrestlers |
|---|---|---|
| 2019 World Championships | 6 | Risako Kawai (JPN); Rong Ningning (CHN); Iryna Kurachkina (BLR); Odunayo Adekuoroye (NGR); Jowita Wrzesień (POL); Anastasia Nichita (MDA) |
| Pan American Qualification Tournament | 2 | Alma Valencia (MEX); Helen Maroulis (USA) |
| European Qualification Tournament | 2 | Evelina Nikolova (BUL); Alina Hrushyna (UKR) |
| African & Oceania Qualification Tournament | 2 | Siwar Bousetta (TUN); Fatoumata Camara (GUI) |
| Asian Qualification Tournament | 2 | Boldsaikhan Khongorzul (MGL); Anshu Malik (IND) |
| World Qualification Tournament | 2 | Veronika Chumikova (ROC); Mathilde Rivière (FRA) |
| Total | 16 | |

=== 62 kg ===
| Competition | Places | Qualified wrestlers |
|---|---|---|
| 2019 World Championships | 6 | Aisuluu Tynybekova (KGZ); Taybe Yusein (BUL); Henna Johansson (SWE); Yukako Kawai (JPN); Marianna Sastin (HUN); Kriszta Incze (ROU) (Note: North Korea's Rim Jong-sim originally earned a quota place at the 2019 World Championships, But North Korea withdrew from the Olympics, Her spot has been replaced by Kriszta Incze, the next best-ranked wrestler from the 2019 World Championships. Wrestlers ahead of her from Ukraine and the United States later qualified at their respective continental qualifier.) |
| Pan American Qualification Tournament | 2 | Laís Nunes (BRA); Kayla Miracle (USA) |
| European Qualification Tournament | 2 | Iryna Koliadenko (UKR); Anastasija Grigorjeva (LAT) |
| African & Oceania Qualification Tournament | 2 | Marwa Amri (TUN); Aminat Adeniyi (NGR) |
| Asian Qualification Tournament | 2 | Long Jia (CHN); Sonam Malik (IND) |
| World Qualification Tournament | 2 | Lyubov Ovcharova (ROC); Khürelkhüügiin Bolortuyaa (MGL) |
| Total | 16 | |

=== 68 kg ===
| Competition | Places | Qualified wrestlers |
|---|---|---|
| 2019 World Championships | 6 | Tamyra Mensah-Stock (USA); Soronzonboldyn Battsetseg (MGL); Alla Cherkasova (UKR); Anna Schell (GER); Sara Dosho (JPN); Agnieszka Wieszczek (POL) (Note: Sweden's Jenny Fransson originally earned a quota place at the 2019 World Championships, But she later failed an out of competition doping test. therefore Sweden rejected the quota, Her spot has been replaced by Agnieszka Wieszczek, the next best-ranked wrestler from the 2019 World Championships.) |
| Pan American Qualification Tournament | 2 | Danielle Lappage (CAN); Yudaris Sánchez (CUB) |
| European Qualification Tournament | 2 | Koumba Larroque (FRA); Khanum Velieva (ROC) |
| African & Oceania Qualification Tournament | 2 | Blessing Oborududu (NGR); Enas Mostafa (EGY) |
| Asian Qualification Tournament | 2 | Zhou Feng (CHN); Meerim Zhumanazarova (KGZ) |
| World Qualification Tournament | 2 | Mimi Hristova (BUL); Elis Manolova (AZE) |
| Total | 16 | |

=== 76 kg ===
| Competition | Places | Qualified wrestlers |
|---|---|---|
| 2019 World Championships | 6 | Adeline Gray (USA); Hiroe Minagawa (JPN); Epp Mäe (EST); Aline Rotter-Focken (GER); Zhou Qian (CHN); Elmira Syzdykova (KAZ) |
| Pan American Qualification Tournament | 2 | Erica Wiebe (CAN); Aline Ferreira (BRA) |
| European Qualification Tournament | 2 | Natalia Vorobieva (ROC); Vasilisa Marzaliuk (BLR) |
| African & Oceania Qualification Tournament | 2 | Samar Amer (EGY); Zaineb Sghaier (TUN) |
| Asian Qualification Tournament | 2 | Aiperi Medet Kyzy (KGZ); Ochirbatyn Burmaa (MGL) |
| World Qualification Tournament | 2 | Alla Belinska (UKR); Yasemin Adar (TUR) |
| Total | 16 | |
