= 2017 African Wrestling Championships =

2017 African Championship
- Host city: Marrakesh, Morocco
- Dates: 28–30 April
- Stadium: Salle Couverte Zerktouni

Champions
- Freestyle: Egypt
- Greco-Roman: Egypt
- Women: Nigeria

The 2017 African Wrestling Championships was held in Marrakesh, Morocco from 28 to 30 April 2017.

== Medal table ==
* Host nation (Morocco)

| Rank | Nation | Gold | Silver | Bronze | Total |
|---|---|---|---|---|---|
| 1 | Egypt (EGY) | 8 | 3 | 3 | 14 |
| 2 | Nigeria (NGR) | 8 | 2 | 1 | 11 |
| 3 | Tunisia (TUN) | 3 | 5 | 8 | 16 |
| 4 | Algeria (ALG) | 2 | 5 | 5 | 12 |
| 5 | Morocco (MAR)* | 2 | 1 | 3 | 6 |
| 6 | Senegal (SEN) | 1 | 2 | 2 | 5 |
| 7 | Cameroon (CMR) | 0 | 5 | 1 | 6 |
| 8 | South Africa (RSA) | 0 | 1 | 1 | 2 |
| 9 | DR Congo (COD) | 0 | 0 | 5 | 5 |
| 10 | Guinea-Bissau (GBS) | 0 | 0 | 1 | 1 |
| 10 | Ivory Coast (CIV) | 0 | 0 | 1 | 1 |
| Totals (11 entries) | | 24 | 24 | 31 | 79 |

=== Team ranking ===
| Rank | Men's freestyle | | Women's freestyle | | Men's Greco-Roman | |
| Rank | Team | Points | Team | Points | Team | Points |
|---|---|---|---|---|---|---|
| 1 | Egypt | 63 | Nigeria | 78 | Egypt | 68 |
| 2 | Tunisia | 51 | Tunisia | 66 | Morocco | 62 |
| 3 | Nigeria | 46 | Cameroon | 52 | Algeria | 56 |
| 4 | Senegal | 40 | Algeria | 39 | Tunisia | 44 |
| 5 | Morocco | 35 | Senegal | 20 | Democratic Republic of the Congo | 43 |
| 6 | Algeria | 29 | Benin | 7 | Nigeria | 8 |
| 7 | Democratic Republic of the Congo | 28 | Ivory Coast | 7 | Ivory Coast | 7 |
| 8 | Sudan | 24 | South Africa | 7 | South Africa | 5 |
| 9 | South Africa | 20 | Egypt | 6 | | |
| 10 | Cameroon | 17 | | | | |
| 11 | Ivory Coast | 13 | | | | |
| 12 | Guinea-Bissau | 12 | | | | |
| 13 | Madagascar | 6 | | | | |

== Medal summary ==
=== Men's freestyle ===
| Event | Gold | Silver | Bronze |
|---|---|---|---|
| 57 kg | (Morocco) Chakir Ansari | (Algeria) Abdelhak Kherbache | (Egypt) Ibrahim Hafez |
| 61 kg | (Senegal) Adama Diatta | (Egypt) Ahmed Mohamed | (Morocco) Othmane El Bahja |
| 61 kg | (Senegal) Adama Diatta | (Egypt) Ahmed Mohamed | (Guinea-Bissau) Mbunde Cumba |
| 65 kg | (Tunisia) Kaireddine Ben Telili | (Senegal) Jean Bernard Diatta | (Democratic Republic of the Congo) Bopamba Ngoy |
| 65 kg | (Tunisia) Kaireddine Ben Telili | (Senegal) Jean Bernard Diatta | (Egypt) Aly Ibrahim Abdelhamid |
| 70 kg | (Nigeria) Ogbonna John | (Tunisia) Maher Ghanmi | (Egypt) Amr Reda Ramadan Hussen |
| 70 kg | (Nigeria) Ogbonna John | (Tunisia) Maher Ghanmi | (Algeria) Mohamed Boudraa |
| 74 kg | (Egypt) Samy Moustafa | (Tunisia) Ali Ayari | (Algeria) Mohamed Boudina |
| 74 kg | (Egypt) Samy Moustafa | (Tunisia) Ali Ayari | (Democratic Republic of the Congo) Kayis Mupompa |
| 86 kg | (Egypt) Mahmoud Badawi | (Tunisia) Mohamed Saadaoui | (Senegal) Cheikh Niang |
| 86 kg | (Egypt) Mahmoud Badawi | (Tunisia) Mohamed Saadaoui | (South Africa) Hein Janse van Rensburg |
| 97 kg | (Nigeria) Soso Tamarau | (South Africa) Martin Erasmus | (Tunisia) Imed Kaddidi |
| 97 kg | (Nigeria) Soso Tamarau | (South Africa) Martin Erasmus | (Cameroon) Cedric Nyamsi Tchouga |
| 125 kg | (Egypt) Diaaeldin Kamal | (Senegal) Thiacka Faye | (Ivory Coast) Adama Tangara |

=== Men's Greco-Roman ===
| Event | Gold | Silver | Bronze |
|---|---|---|---|
| 59 kg | (Algeria) Abdennour Laouni | (Morocco) Anwar Tango | (Democratic Republic of the Congo) Ngeta Ibamda |
| 66 kg | (Egypt) Mohamed Abouhalima | (Algeria) Tarek Benaissa | (Tunisia) Fahmi Meddeb |
| 66 kg | (Egypt) Mohamed Abouhalima | (Algeria) Tarek Benaissa | (Morocco) Bilal El-Bahja |
| 71 kg | (Egypt) Ibrahim Ghanem | (Algeria) Akrem Boudjemline | (Morocco) Aziz Boualem |
| 75 kg | (Morocco) Zied Ait Ouagram | (Egypt) Mohamed Elsayed | (Democratic Republic of the Congo) Kayis Mupompa |
| 80 kg | (Algeria) Bachir Sid Azara | (Egypt) Mahmoud Fawzy | (Nigeria) Tochukwu Okeke |
| 85 kg | (Egypt) Mohamed Metwally | (Algeria) Adem Boudjemline | (Tunisia) Mohamed Missaoui |
| 98 kg | (Egypt) Ahmed Othman | (Algeria) Hamza Haloui | (Tunisia) Amine Guennichi |
| 130 kg | (Egypt) Abdellatif Mohamed | (Tunisia) Radhouane Chebbi | (Democratic Republic of the Congo) Gagan Mabuba |

=== Women's freestyle ===
| Event | Gold | Silver | Bronze |
|---|---|---|---|
| 48 kg | (Nigeria) Mercy Genesis | (Tunisia) Sarra Hamdi | (Algeria) Kheira Yahiaoui |
| 53 kg | (Tunisia) Maroi Mezien | (Nigeria) Bose Samuel | (Algeria) Hanene Salaouandji |
| 55 kg | (Nigeria) Odunayo Adekuoroye | (Cameroon) Joseph Essombe | (Tunisia) Rim Ayari |
| 58 kg | (Nigeria) Aminat Adeniyi | (Cameroon) Gertrude Prombove Yondno | (Tunisia) Dorssaf Gharssi |
| 60 kg | (Tunisia) Marwa Amri | (Nigeria) Bisola Makanjuola | (Algeria) Amina Benabderrahmane |
| 63 kg | (Nigeria) Blessing Oborududu | (Cameroon) Berthe Etane Ngolle | (Tunisia) Lilia Mejri |
| 69 kg | (Nigeria) Dressman Kemasuodei | (Cameroon) Blandine Metala Epanga | (Senegal) Anta Sambou |
| 75 kg | (Nigeria) Winnie Gofit | (Cameroon) Danielle Sino Guemde | (Tunisia) Wiem Trabelsi |

== Doping cases ==
- Zohier Iftene from Algeria who won men's freestyle 65 kg event, tested positive for Stanozolol after the competition.
