= 2018 African Wrestling Championships =

2018 African Championship
- Host city: Port Harcourt, Nigeria
- Dates: 7–11 February
- Stadium: Alfred Diete Spiff Civic Center

Champions
- Freestyle: Nigeria
- Greco-Roman: Egypt
- Women: Nigeria

The 2018 African Wrestling Championships was held in Port Harcourt, Nigeria from 7 to 11 February 2018.

== Medal table ==
Rank	Nation	Gold	Silver	Bronze	Total
1	Nigeria (NGR)	15	5	3	23
2	Egypt (EGY)	6	7	5	18
3	Algeria (ALG)	5	2	4	11
4	Tunisia (TUN)	2	7	4	13
5	South Africa (RSA)	2	2	2	6
6	Morocco (MAR)	0	3	6	9
7	Cameroon (CMR)	0	2	4	6
8	Senegal (SEN)	0	1	2	3
9	Kenya (KEN)	0	1	1	2
10	Sudan (SUD)	0	0	2	2
11	Angola (ANG)	0	0	1	1
Totals (11 entries)		30	30	34	94

=== Team ranking ===
Rank	Men's freestyle		Women's freestyle		Men's Greco-Roman	
Rank	Team	Points	Team	Points	Team	Points
1	Nigeria	205	Nigeria	245	Egypt	197
2	South Africa	117	Tunisia	122	Algeria	160
3	Egypt	111	Egypt	87	Morocco	135
4	Tunisia	86	Cameroon	55	Nigeria	131
5	Algeria	76	Senegal	47	Tunisia	90
6	Kenya	64	Kenya	42	Kenya	56
7	Senegal	50	Algeria	41	South Africa	33
8	Sudan	47	Ivory Coast	20	Cameroon	31
9	Morocco	46	Benin	12	Sierra Leone	18
10	Cameroon	38	Guinea	9	Democratic Republic of the Congo	12

== Medal summary ==
=== Men's freestyle ===
Event	Gold	Silver	Bronze
57 kg	(South Africa) Jan Combrinck	(Nigeria) Ebikewenimo Welson	(Algeria) Abdelhak Kherbache
57 kg	(South Africa) Jan Combrinck	(Nigeria) Ebikewenimo Welson	(Egypt) Gamal Mohamed
61 kg	(Senegal) Adama Diatta	(Tunisia) Chedli Methlouthi	(Nigeria) Firstman Victor
65 kg	(Nigeria) Amas Daniel	(Tunisia) Haithem Dakhlaoui	(Algeria) Fares Lakel
65 kg	(Nigeria) Amas Daniel	(Tunisia) Haithem Dakhlaoui	(South Africa) Reynhardt Louw
70 kg	(Nigeria) Ogbonna John	(Egypt) Amr Reda Hussen	(Senegal) Jean Bernard Diatta
70 kg	(Nigeria) Ogbonna John	(Egypt) Amr Reda Hussen	(Algeria) Chems Eddine Bouchaib
74 kg	(Tunisia) Ayoub Barraj	(Egypt) Samy Moustafa	(Sudan) Ali Mustafa
79 kg	(Nigeria) Ekerekeme Agiomor	(South Africa) Fredylan George Marais	(Morocco) Oussema Rigani
79 kg	(Nigeria) Ekerekeme Agiomor	(South Africa) Fredylan George Marais	(Angola) Francisco Kadima
86 kg	(Nigeria) Melvin Bibo	(South Africa) Hein Janse van Rensburg	(Sudan) Guma Basher
86 kg	(Nigeria) Melvin Bibo	(South Africa) Hein Janse van Rensburg	(Tunisia) Imed Kaddidi
92 kg	(Egypt) Hosam Mohamed Merghany	(Nigeria) Robert Daufa	(Kenya) John Odhiambo Omondi
97 kg	(South Africa) Martin Erasmus	(Nigeria) Soso Tamarau	(Cameroon) Cedric Tchouga Nyamsi
125 kg	(Egypt) Khaled Abdalla	(Nigeria) Sinivie Boltic	(Cameroon) Claude Kouamen Mbianga

=== Men's Greco-Roman ===
Event	Gold	Silver	Bronze
55 kg	(Algeria) Abdelkarim Fergat	(Egypt) Mahmoud Hemdan Hussein	(South Africa) Given Chochi
60 kg	(Algeria) Abdennour Laouni	(Egypt) Rabie Hamed Ahmed	(Morocco) Anwar Tango
63 kg	(Egypt) Hassan Ahmed Mohamed	(Tunisia) Souleymen Nasr	(Morocco) Fouad Fajari
67 kg	(Egypt) Mohamed Ibrahim El-Sayed	(Morocco) Ayoub Hanine	(Nigeria) Romeo Joseph
67 kg	(Egypt) Mohamed Ibrahim El-Sayed	(Morocco) Ayoub Hanine	(Algeria) Ishak Ghaiou
72 kg	(Nigeria) Emmanuel Nworie	(Egypt) Gamal Ashour Marzouk	(Morocco) Aziz Boualem
77 kg	(Algeria) Akrem Boudjemline	(Morocco) Zied Ait Ouagram	(Nigeria) Perefaghe Kiribein
77 kg	(Algeria) Akrem Boudjemline	(Morocco) Zied Ait Ouagram	(Egypt) Mohamed Zahab Khalil
82 kg	(Egypt) Ahmed Aly Ahmed	(Algeria) Bachir Sid Azara	(Morocco) Khalid Sahli
87 kg	(Algeria) Adem Boudjemline	(Tunisia) Mohamed Missaoui	(Egypt) Fathi Abdelrahman Ali
97 kg	(Algeria) Hamza Haloui	(Morocco) Choucri Atafi	(Tunisia) Amine Guennichi
130 kg	(Tunisia) Radhouane Chebbi	(Egypt) Youssef Aly Issa	(Morocco) Anas Lamkabber

=== Women's freestyle ===
Event	Gold	Silver	Bronze
50 kg	(Nigeria) Mercy Genesis	(Algeria) Kheira Chaimaa Yahiaoui	(Tunisia) Sarra Hamdi
53 kg	(Nigeria) Bose Samuel	(Tunisia) Maroi Mezien	(Egypt) Maiada Morad Abbas
55 kg	(Nigeria) Ifeoma Nwoye	(Tunisia) Faten Hammami	none awarded
57 kg	(Nigeria) Odunayo Adekuoroye	(Cameroon) Joseph Essombe	(Tunisia) Dorssaf Gharssi
59 kg	(Nigeria) Bisola Makanjuola	(Egypt) Eman Guda Ebrahim	(Senegal) Safietou Goudiaby
62 kg	(Nigeria) Aminat Adeniyi	(Tunisia) Lilia Mejri	none awarded
65 kg	(Nigeria) Hannah Rueben	(Cameroon) Alakeme Azong Gaelle	(Egypt) Amina Elsebaee Ibrahim
68 kg	(Nigeria) Blessing Oborududu	(Senegal) Anta Sambou	(Cameroon) Berthe Etane Ngolle
72 kg	(Nigeria) Winnie Gofit	(Kenya) Lilian Kiende Nthiga	none awarded
76 kg	(Egypt) Samar Amer	(Nigeria) Blessing Onyebuchi	(Cameroon) Annabelle Ali
