= 2016 African Wrestling Championships =

2016 African Championship
- Host city: Alexandria, Egypt
- Dates: 2–7 March

Champions
- Freestyle: Egypt
- Greco-Roman: Egypt
- Women: Egypt & Nigeria

The 2016 African Wrestling Championships was held in Alexandria, Egypt from 2 to 7 March 2016.

== Medal table ==
Rank	Nation	Gold	Silver	Bronze	Total
1	Egypt (EGY)	9	6	7	22
2	Tunisia (TUN)	5	5	3	13
3	Nigeria (NGR)	4	3	3	10
4	Algeria (ALG)	2	5	8	15
5	Senegal (SEN)	2	0	0	2
6	Cameroon (CMR)	1	1	3	5
7	Guinea-Bissau (GBS)	1	0	2	3
8	South Africa (RSA)	0	2	6	8
9	Morocco (MAR)	0	2	3	5
10	Namibia (NAM)	0	0	2	2
11	Chad (CHA)	0	0	1	1
Totals (11 entries)		24	24	38	86

=== Team ranking ===
Rank	Men's freestyle		Women's freestyle		Men's Greco-Roman	
Rank	Team	Points	Team	Points	Team	Points
1	Egypt	71	Egypt	63	Egypt	77
2	Algeria	49	Nigeria	63	Algeria	63
3	Tunisia	44	Tunisia	54	Morocco	62
4	South Africa	42	Cameroon	46	Tunisia	39
5	Morocco	41	Algeria	43	South Africa	32
6	Senegal	36	South Africa	35	Namibia	8
7	Guinea-Bissau	35	Senegal	35	Nigeria	7
8	Nigeria	35	Chad	10		
9	Chad	27	Ivory Coast	6		
10	Namibia	14	Madagascar	4		
11	Cameroon	8				
12	Republic of the Congo	7				
13	Ivory Coast	6				
14	Madagascar	6				

== Medal summary ==
=== Men's freestyle ===
Event	Gold	Silver	Bronze
57 kg	(Senegal) Adama Diatta	(Nigeria) Ebikewenimo Welson	(Egypt) Mohamed Ihab Maghwari Hegab
57 kg	(Senegal) Adama Diatta	(Nigeria) Ebikewenimo Welson	(Algeria) Abdelghani Benatallah
61 kg	(Tunisia) Mathlouthi Chedli	(Algeria) Amar Chergui	(Egypt) Amr Essam Ramadan
61 kg	(Tunisia) Mathlouthi Chedli	(Algeria) Amar Chergui	(Namibia) Sem Shilimela
65 kg	(Nigeria) Amas Daniel	(Egypt) Ibrahim Abdelhamid	(Guinea-Bissau) Mbunde Cumba
65 kg	(Nigeria) Amas Daniel	(Egypt) Ibrahim Abdelhamid	(South Africa) Terry van Rensburg
70 kg	(Tunisia) Maher Ghanmi	(South Africa) Johannes Petrus Botha	(Egypt) Ali Ragab
70 kg	(Tunisia) Maher Ghanmi	(South Africa) Johannes Petrus Botha	(Algeria) Nassrallah Lallouche
74 kg	(Guinea-Bissau) Augusto Midana	(Egypt) Samy Moustafa	(Nigeria) Melvin Bibo
74 kg	(Guinea-Bissau) Augusto Midana	(Egypt) Samy Moustafa	(South Africa) Wilhelm Meyer
86 kg	(Tunisia) Mohamed Saadaoui	(Egypt) Mohamed Zaghloul	(Guinea-Bissau) Quintino Intipe
86 kg	(Tunisia) Mohamed Saadaoui	(Egypt) Mohamed Zaghloul	(Algeria) Mohamed Mostefaoui
97 kg	(Egypt) Ali Hamdy Amin Rabei Mosutafa	(South Africa) Martin Erasmus	(Cameroon) Cedric Nyamsi Tchouga
97 kg	(Egypt) Ali Hamdy Amin Rabei Mosutafa	(South Africa) Martin Erasmus	(Nigeria) Soso Tamarau
125 kg	(Egypt) Diaaeldin Kamal	(Tunisia) Slim Trabelsi	(Chad) Maurice Abatam
125 kg	(Egypt) Diaaeldin Kamal	(Tunisia) Slim Trabelsi	(Algeria) Mohamed Bendjilalli

=== Men's Greco-Roman ===
Event	Gold	Silver	Bronze
59 kg	(Egypt) Rabie Hamed Ahmed	(Algeria) Mouatez Djedaiet	(Morocco) Fouad Fajari
66 kg	(Egypt) Mohamed Ibrahim El-Sayed	(Algeria) Tarek Benaissa	(Tunisia) Souleymen Nasr
71 kg	(Egypt) Abou Halima	(Morocco) Ahmed Samorah	(Algeria) Akrem Boudjemline
71 kg	(Egypt) Abou Halima	(Morocco) Ahmed Samorah	(Namibia) Lukas Thomas
75 kg	(Egypt) Mahmoud Fawzy	(Morocco) Aziz Boualem	(South Africa) Zander Geringer
80 kg	(Algeria) Bachir Sid Azara	(Egypt) Omar Khalied Ibrahim	(Morocco) Yassine Sardi
85 kg	(Algeria) Adem Boudjemline	(Tunisia) Mohamed Missaoui	(Egypt) Mohamed Metwally
98 kg	(Egypt) Ahmed Othman	(Algeria) Hamza Haloui	(Morocco) Choucri Atafi
130 kg	(Egypt) Abdellatif Mohamed	(Tunisia) Radhouane Chebbi	(Algeria) Ali Bouachioum

=== Women's freestyle ===
Event	Gold	Silver	Bronze
48 kg	(Cameroon) Rebecca Muambo	(Nigeria) Rosemary Nweke	(Algeria) Hanene Salaounandji
53 kg	(Senegal) Isabelle Sambou	(Egypt) Mona El Basyo	(Tunisia) Maroi Mezien
55 kg	(Nigeria) Odunayo Adekuoroye	(Tunisia) Rim Ayari	(South Africa) Norma Gordon
55 kg	(Nigeria) Odunayo Adekuoroye	(Tunisia) Rim Ayari	(Cameroon) Joseph Essombe
58 kg	(Tunisia) Marwa Amri	(Nigeria) Nwoye Ifeora	(Egypt) Noura Hamed
60 kg	(Tunisia) Hela Riabi	(Algeria) Amina Benabderrahmane	(South Africa) Jeanne-Marie Coetzer
60 kg	(Tunisia) Hela Riabi	(Algeria) Amina Benabderrahmane	(Egypt) Haiat Farag
63 kg	(Nigeria) Aminat Adeniyi	(Egypt) Amina Elsebaee	(South Africa) Leanco Stans
63 kg	(Nigeria) Aminat Adeniyi	(Egypt) Amina Elsebaee	(Tunisia) Syrine Issaoui
69 kg	(Nigeria) Blessing Oborududu	(Tunisia) Rihem Ayari	(Egypt) Nadia Ahmed
69 kg	(Nigeria) Blessing Oborududu	(Tunisia) Rihem Ayari	(Cameroon) Blandine Metala Epanga
75 kg	(Egypt) Samar Amer	(Cameroon) Annabelle Ali	(Nigeria) Blessing Onyebuchi
75 kg	(Egypt) Samar Amer	(Cameroon) Annabelle Ali	(Algeria) Tassadit Amer
