= 2021 African & Oceania Wrestling Olympic Qualification Tournament =

- Venue: Salle Couverte Hammamet
- Location: Hammamet, Tunisia
- Dates: 2–4 April 2021

The 2021 African & Oceania Wrestling Olympic Qualification Tournament was the third regional qualifying tournament for the 2020 Summer Olympics. The event was held from 2 to 4 April 2021, in Hammamet, Tunisia.

== Qualification summary ==
A total of 36 athletes secured a spot in the 2020 Summer Olympics, in Tokyo, Japan. Two spots were given to each of the weight classes in every event. This allows a total of 12 available spots for each event. Every winner and runner-up per class were awarded their place for wrestling, at the 2020 Summer Olympics. Quota places are allocated to the respective NOC and not to competitor that achieved the place in the qualification event.

NOC	Men's freestyle						Men's Greco-Roman						Women's freestyle						Total
NOC	57	65	74	86	97	125	60	67	77	87	97	130	50	53	57	62	68	76	Total
Algeria	X			X	X	X	X	X		X	X								8
Cameroon														X					1
Egypt			X			X	X			X		X					X	X	7
Guam														X					1
Guinea															X				1
Guinea-Bissau	X		X																2
Morocco									X										1
Nigeria				X									X			X	X		4
Senegal		X																	1
Tunisia		X			X			X	X		X	X	X		X	X		X	10
Total: 10 NOCs	2	2	2	2	2	2	2	2	2	2	2	2	2	2	2	2	2	2	36

== Men's freestyle ==
=== 57 kg ===
4 April

Round of 16
~~Ethan Aguigui (GUM)~~
Jakobo Tau (RSA)	WO
Mohamed Camara (GUI)	3
Ebikewenimo Welson (NGR)	8
Gamal Mohamed (EGY)	1
Diamantino Iuna Fafé (GBS)	6

Quarterfinals
Kossai Ajimi (TUN)	0
Abdelhak Kherbache (ALG)	11
Junjun Asebias (FSM)	14^{F}
Josh Failauga (ASA)	1
Chakir Ansari (MAR)	15
Jakobo Tau (RSA)	4
Ebikewenimo Welson (NGR)	5
Diamantino Iuna Fafé (GBS)	6

Semifinals
Abdelhak Kherbache (ALG)	15
Junjun Asebias (FSM)	8
Chakir Ansari (MAR)	0
Diamantino Iuna Fafé (GBS)	10

Final
Abdelhak Kherbache (ALG)	0
Diamantino Iuna Fafé (GBS)	4^{F}

Repechage round 1
Gamal Mohamed (EGY)	6
Ebikewenimo Welson (NGR)	6^{R}

Bronze medals
Kossai Ajimi (TUN)	2
Junjun Asebias (FSM)	0
Gamal Mohamed (EGY)	14
Chakir Ansari (MAR)	16

=== 65 kg ===
4 April

Round of 16
Amas Daniel (NGR)	3
Fathi Tarek Ismail (EGY)	4
Haithem Dakhlaoui (TUN)	14
Mostafa Rezaeifar (AUS)	3
Abdelwahad Badri (MAR)	0
Amar Laissaoui (ALG)	10

Quarterfinals
Aimé Rakotoniaina (MAD)	13^{F}
Cristian Nicolescu (PLW)	0
Reynhardt Louw (RSA)	0
Adama Diatta (SEN)	11
Mbundé Cumba (GBS)	8
Fathi Tarek Ismail (EGY)	11
Haithem Dakhlaoui (TUN)	4
Amar Laissaoui (ALG)	2

Semifinals
Aimé Rakotoniaina (MAD)	0
Adama Diatta (SEN)	10
Fathi Tarek Ismail (EGY)	3
Haithem Dakhlaoui (TUN)	6

Final
Adama Diatta (SEN)	1
Haithem Dakhlaoui (TUN)	1

Repechage round 1
Mostafa Rezaeifar (AUS)	12
Amar Laissaoui (ALG)	12

Bronze medals
Reynhardt Louw (RSA)	11
Aimé Rakotoniaina (MAD)	0
Mostafa Rezaeifar (AUS)	4
Fathi Tarek Ismail (EGY)	10

=== 74 kg ===
4 April

Round of 16
Ishak Boukhors (ALG)	10
Guy Delumeau (PLW)	0
Rabii Regani (MAR)	13
Mathayo Mahabila (KEN)	2

Quarterfinals
Amr Reda Hussen (EGY)	16
Ogbonna John (NGR)	11
Jaundre van Riel (RSA)	4
Elias Vaoifi (ASA)	9
Ayoub Barraj (TUN)	2
Augusto Midana (GBS)	9
Ishak Boukhors (ALG)	10^{F}
Rabii Regani (MAR)	0

Semifinals
Amr Reda Hussen (EGY)	10
Elias Vaoifi (ASA)	0
Augusto Midana (GBS)	4
Ishak Boukhors (ALG)	1

Final
Amr Reda Hussen (EGY)	10
Augusto Midana (GBS)	0

Bronze medals
Ogbonna John (NGR)	6
Elias Vaoifi (ASA)	2
Ayoub Barraj (TUN)	WO
Ishak Boukhors (ALG)

=== 86 kg ===
4 April

Quarterfinals		Semifinals		Final
Khaled El-Moatamadawi (EGY)	10
Zander Geringer (RSA)	0	Khaled El-Moatamadawi (EGY)	1
Fateh Benferdjallah (ALG)	5	Fateh Benferdjallah (ALG)	2
Bedopassa Buassat (GBS)	3			Fateh Benferdjallah (ALG)	6
Nolan Puletasi (ASA)	0			Ekerekeme Agiomor (NGR)	7
Jayden Lawrence (AUS)	2^{F}	Jayden Lawrence (AUS)	2
Ekerekeme Agiomor (NGR)	12	Ekerekeme Agiomor (NGR)	12
Maher Ghanmi (TUN)	7

Bronze medals
Bedopassa Buassat (GBS)	0
Khaled El-Moatamadawi (EGY)	7
Maher Ghanmi (TUN)	10
Jayden Lawrence (AUS)	0

=== 97 kg ===
4 April

Round of 16
Martin Erasmus (RSA)	10
Tyler Ili (ASA)	0

Quarterfinals
Thomas Barns (AUS)	1
Mohamed Saadaoui (TUN)	14
Amadu Kamara (SLE)	0
Hosam Merghany (EGY)	8^{F}
Ulrich Manouan (CIV)	0
Soso Tamarau (NGR)	11
Mohammed Fardj (ALG)	2
Martin Erasmus (RSA)	1

Semifinals
Mohamed Saadaoui (TUN)	7
Hosam Merghany (EGY)	1
Soso Tamarau (NGR)	3
Mohammed Fardj (ALG)	6

Final
Mohamed Saadaoui (TUN)	2
Mohammed Fardj (ALG)	0^{R}

Bronze medals
Thomas Barns (AUS)	4
Hosam Merghany (EGY)	6
Martin Erasmus (RSA)	4^{F}
Soso Tamarau (NGR)	5

=== 125 kg ===
4 April

Pos	Athlete	Pld	W	L	CP	TP	EGY	TUN	SEN
1	Diaaeldin Kamal (EGY)	2	2	0	8	5	—	5–4	WO
2	Abdelmoneim Adouli (TUN)	2	1	1	6	4	1–3 PO1	—	WO
—	Thiacka Faye (SEN)	2	0	2	0	0	0–5 FO	0–5 FO	—

Source: UWW

Pos	Athlete	Pld	W	L	CP	TP	ALG	RSA	MAR
1	Djahid Berrahal (ALG)	2	2	0	8	12	—	8–8	4–0 Fall
2	Johannes Kriel (RSA)	2	1	1	6	12	1–3 PO1	—	4–0 Fall
3	Ahmed Serehali (MAR)	2	0	2	0	0	0–5 FA	0–5 FA	—

Source: UWW

Semifinals
Diaaeldin Kamal (EGY)	2
Johannes Kriel (RSA)	0^{R}
Djahid Berrahal (ALG)	8^{F}
Abdelmoneim Adouli (TUN)	4

Final
Diaaeldin Kamal (EGY)	4
Djahid Berrahal (ALG)	0
Bronze medal
Johannes Kriel (RSA)
Abdelmoneim Adouli (TUN)	WO

== Men's Greco-Roman ==
=== 60 kg ===
2 April

Pos	Athlete	Pld	W	L	CP	TP	ALG	TUN	ASA
1	Abdelkarim Fergat (ALG)	2	2	0	8	18	—	10–0	8–0
2	Mehdi Jouini (TUN)	2	1	1	4	11	0–4 SU	—	11–0
3	Josh Failauga (ASA)	2	0	2	0	0	0–4 SU	0–4 SU	—

Source: UWW

Pos	Athlete	Pld	W	L	CP	TP	EGY	MAR	NAM
1	Haithem Mahmoud (EGY)	2	2	0	7	11	—	3–1	8–0
2	Fouad Fajari (MAR)	2	1	1	5	13	1–3 PO1	—	12–4
3	Romio Goliath (NAM)	2	0	2	1	4	0–4 SU	1–4 SU1	—

Source: UWW

Semifinals
Abdelkarim Fergat (ALG)	5
Fouad Fajari (MAR)	3
Haithem Mahmoud (EGY)	9
Mehdi Jouini (TUN)	0

Final
Abdelkarim Fergat (ALG)	3
Haithem Mahmoud (EGY)	10
Bronze medal
Fouad Fajari (MAR)	8
Mehdi Jouini (TUN)	0

=== 67 kg ===
2 April

Pos	Athlete	Pld	W	L	CP	TP	TUN	ALG	RSA	MAR
1	Souleymen Nasr (TUN)	3	3	0	12	25	—	8–0	9–0	8–0
2	Abdelmalek Merabet (ALG)	3	2	1	8	19	0–4 SU	—	10–2	9–1
3	Gert Coetzee (RSA)	3	1	2	5	10	0–4 SU	1–4 SU1	—	8–0
4	Mouad Lachkar (MAR)	3	0	3	1	1	0–4 SU	1–4 SU1	0–4 SU	—

Source: UWW

=== 77 kg ===
2 April

Pos	Athlete	Pld	W	L	CP	TP	TUN	MAR	RSA
1	Lamjed Maafi (TUN)	2	2	0	7	15	—	7–5	8–0
2	Zied Ayet Ikram (MAR)	2	1	1	6	9	1–3 PO1	—	4–1 Fall
3	Richard Ferreira (RSA)	2	0	2	0	1	0–4 SU	0–5 FA	—

Source: UWW

Pos	Athlete	Pld	W	L	CP	TP	EGY	ALG	SLE
1	Wael Abdelrahman (EGY)	2	2	0	8	17	—	9–1	8–0
2	Abdelkrim Ouakali (ALG)	2	1	1	5	10	1–4 SU1	—	9–0
3	Foday Kargbo (SLE)	2	0	2	0	0	0–4 SU	0–4 SU	—

Source: UWW

Semifinals
Lamjed Maafi (TUN)	5
Abdelkrim Ouakali (ALG)	1
Wael Abdelrahman (EGY)	5
Zied Ayet Ikram (MAR)	7

Final
Lamjed Maafi (TUN)	3
Zied Ayet Ikram (MAR)	3
Bronze medal
Abdelkrim Ouakali (ALG)	4
Wael Abdelrahman (EGY)	8

=== 87 kg ===
2 April

Pos	Athlete	Pld	W	L	CP	TP	ALG	RSA	ASA
1	Bachir Sid Azara (ALG)	2	2	0	8	18	—	9–0	9–0
2	Edward Lessing (RSA)	2	1	1	4	11	0–4 SU	—	11–0
3	Ariston Bartley (ASA)	2	0	2	0	0	0–4 SU	0–4 SU	—

Source: UWW

Pos	Athlete	Pld	W	L	CP	TP	EGY	TUN	MAR
1	Mohamed Metwally (EGY)	2	2	0	7	11	—	8–0	3–0
2	Skander Missaoui (TUN)	2	1	1	4	8	0–4 SU	—	8–0
3	Aziz Boualem (MAR)	2	0	2	0	0	0–3 PO	0–4 SU	—

Source: UWW

Semifinals
Bachir Sid Azara (ALG)	7
Skander Missaoui (TUN)	3
Mohamed Metwally (EGY)	12^{F}
Edward Lessing (RSA)	2

Final
Bachir Sid Azara (ALG)
Mohamed Metwally (EGY)	WO
Bronze medal
Skander Missaoui (TUN)	11^{F}
Edward Lessing (RSA)	10

=== 97 kg ===
2 April

Pos	Athlete	Pld	W	L	CP	TP	ALG	TUN	EGY	EOR	ASA
1	Adem Boudjemline (ALG)	4	4	0	16	36	—	9–0	9–0	9–0	9–0
2	Haykel Achouri (TUN)	4	3	1	11	25	0–4 SU	—	6–6	9–0	10–1
3	Mohamed Ali Gabr (EGY)	4	2	2	10	21	0–4 SU	1–3 PO1	—	7–0 Ret	8–0
4	Amir Al-Awad (EOR)	4	1	3	3	3	0–4 SU	0–4 SU	0–5 IN	—	3–1
5	Tyler Ili (ASA)	4	0	4	2	2	0–4 SU	1–4 SU1	0–4 SU	1–3 PO1	—

Source: UWW

=== 130 kg ===
2 April

Pos	Athlete	Pld	W	L	CP	TP	EGY	TUN	ALG	MAR
1	Abdellatif Mohamed (EGY)	3	3	0	12	9	—	1–1	8–0	WO
2	Amine Guennichi (TUN)	3	2	1	9	18	1–3 PO1	—	9–0	8–0
3	Hichem Kouchit (ALG)	3	1	2	3	7	0–4 SU	0–4 SU	—	7–0
4	Choucri Atafi (MAR)	3	0	3	0	0	0–5 IN	0–4 SU	0–3 PO	—

Source: UWW

== Women's freestyle ==
=== 50 kg ===
3 April

Pos	Athlete	Pld	W	L	CP	TP	TUN	NGR	EGY	ALG	GBS
1	Sarra Hamdi (TUN)	4	4	0	13	32	—	2–1	6–2	13–0	11–2
2	Adijat Idris (NGR)	4	3	1	12	32	1–3 PO1	—	11–0	5–0	15–4
3	Nada Medani (EGY)	4	2	2	7	13	1–3 PO1	0–4 SU	—	3–2	8–0
4	Ibtissem Doudou (ALG)	4	1	3	6	7	0–4 SU	0–3 PO	1–3 PO1	—	5–0 Fall
5	Debora Ture (GBS)	4	0	4	2	6	1–3 PO1	1–4 SU1	0–3 PO	0–5 FA	—

Source: UWW

=== 53 kg ===
3 April

Quarterfinals		Semifinals		Final
Joseph Essombe (CMR)	2^{F}
Bose Samuel (NGR)	1	Joseph Essombe (CMR)	10^{F}
Irene Symeonidis (AUS)	0	Lamia Chemlal (ALG)	0
Lamia Chemlal (ALG)	11			Joseph Essombe (CMR)	10
Emma Wangila (KEN)	0			Rckaela Aquino (GUM)	0
Siwar Louati (TUN)	6^{F}	Siwar Louati (TUN)	0
Rckaela Aquino (GUM)	4^{F}	Rckaela Aquino (GUM)	10
Elisa Rasoanantenaina (MAD)	0

Bronze medals
Bose Samuel (NGR)	10
Lamia Chemlal (ALG)	0
Elisa Rasoanantenaina (MAD)	1
Siwar Louati (TUN)	4^{F}

=== 57 kg ===
3 April

Pos	Athlete	Pld	W	L	CP	TP	GUI	EGY	GUM
1	Fatoumata Camara (GUI)	2	2	0	6	15	—	8–2	7–1
2	Eman Essam (EGY)	2	1	1	6	4	1–3 PO1	—	2–2 Fall
3	Mia-Lahnee Aquino (GUM)	2	0	2	1	3	1–3 PO1	0–5 FA	—

Source: UWW

Pos	Athlete	Pld	W	L	CP	TP	TUN	ALG	MAR
1	Siwar Bousetta (TUN)	2	2	0	10	15	—	9–0 Fall	6–0 Fall
2	Rayane Houfaf (ALG)	2	1	1	5	8	0–5 FA	—	8–1 Fall
3	Atika El-Asla (MAR)	2	0	2	0	1	0–5 FA	0–5 FA	—

Source: UWW

Semifinals
Fatoumata Camara (GUI)	6^{F}
Rayane Houfaf (ALG)	0
Siwar Bousetta (TUN)	9
Eman Essam (EGY)	2

Final
Fatoumata Camara (GUI)	3
Siwar Bousetta (TUN)	9
Bronze medal
Rayane Houfaf (ALG)	WO
Eman Essam (EGY)

=== 62 kg ===
3 April

Pos	Athlete	Pld	W	L	CP	TP	TUN	NGR	CMR	ALG	MAR
1	Marwa Amri (TUN)	4	4	0	16	20	—	3–1	7–0	4–0 Fall	6–2 Fall
2	Aminat Adeniyi (NGR)	4	3	1	11	21	1–3 PO1	—	3–0	7–0	10–0
3	Berthe Etane Ngolle (CMR)	4	2	2	9	21	0–3 PO	0–3 PO	—	13–0	8–1 Fall
4	Amel Hammiche (ALG)	4	1	3	4	13	0–5 FA	0–3 PO	0–4 SU	—	13–1
5	Zineb Hassoune (MAR)	4	0	4	1	4	0–5 FA	0–4 SU	0–5 FA	1–4 SU1	—

Source: UWW

=== 68 kg ===
3 April

Pos	Athlete	Pld	W	L	CP	TP	NGR	EGY	TUN	SEN
1	Blessing Oborududu (NGR)	3	3	0	13	27	—	13–2	4–0 Fall	10–0
2	Enas Mostafa (EGY)	3	1	2	7	12	1–4 SU1	—	6–0 Fall	4–5
3	Khadija Jlassi (TUN)	3	1	2	5	8	0–5 FA	0–5 FA	—	8–0 Fall
4	Anta Sambou (SEN)	3	1	2	3	5	0–4 SU	3–1 PO1	0–5 FA	—

Source: UWW

=== 76 kg ===
3 April

Pos	Athlete	Pld	W	L	CP	TP	EGY	TUN	CIV
1	Samar Amer (EGY)	2	2	0	9	15	—	5–0 Fall	10–0
2	Zaineb Sghaier (TUN)	2	1	1	3	4	0–5 FA	—	4–2
3	Amy Youin (CIV)	2	0	2	1	2	0–4 SU	1–3 PO1	—

Source: UWW

== See also ==
- 2020 Pan American Wrestling Olympic Qualification Tournament
- 2021 European Wrestling Olympic Qualification Tournament
- 2021 Asian Wrestling Olympic Qualification Tournament
- 2021 World Wrestling Olympic Qualification Tournament
