= 2020 African Wrestling Championships =

- Host city: Algiers, Algeria
- Dates: 8–9 February
- Stadium: La Coupole d'Alger Arena

Champions
- Freestyle: ALG
- Greco-Roman: ALG
- Women: NGR

The 2020 African Wrestling Championships was held in Algiers, Algeria from 8 to 9 February 2020.

Competitions were held in three age groups: cadets, juniors, and seniors according to United World Wrestling rules.

== Medals ==
=== Seniors ===
* Host nation (Algeria)

Rank	Nation	Gold	Silver	Bronze	Total
1	Algeria (ALG)*	9	5	7	21
2	Nigeria (NGR)	7	5	2	14
3	Egypt (EGY)	6	10	10	26
4	Tunisia (TUN)	6	5	8	19
5	Guinea-Bissau (GBS)	1	1	0	2
6	Cameroon (CMR)	1	0	1	2
7	South Africa (RSA)	0	1	3	4
8	Madagascar (MAD)	0	1	0	1
8	Namibia (NAM)	0	1	0	1
8	Senegal (SEN)	0	1	0	1
11	Morocco (MAR)	0	0	3	3
12	Angola (ANG)	0	0	1	1
12	Burkina Faso (BUR)	0	0	1	1
Totals (13 entries)		30	30	36	96

=== Juniors (U20) ===
* Host nation (Algeria)

Rank	Nation	Gold	Silver	Bronze	Total
1	Egypt (EGY)	11	11	3	25
2	Tunisia (TUN)	8	4	6	18
3	Algeria (ALG)*	7	13	7	27
4	Morocco (MAR)	2	0	4	6
4	South Africa (RSA)	2	0	4	6
6	Guinea-Bissau (GBS)	0	1	0	1
7	Ivory Coast (CIV)	0	0	2	2
Totals (7 entries)		30	29	26	85

=== Cadets (U17) ===
* Host nation (Algeria)

Rank	Nation	Gold	Silver	Bronze	Total
1	Egypt (EGY)	16	5	1	22
2	Algeria (ALG)*	7	11	9	27
3	Tunisia (TUN)	6	10	5	21
4	South Africa (RSA)	1	3	5	9
5	Morocco (MAR)	0	1	1	2
6	Namibia (NAM)	0	0	1	1
Totals (6 entries)		30	30	22	82

== Medal summary ==
=== Men's freestyle ===
Event	Gold	Silver	Bronze
57 kg	(Algeria) Abdelhak Kherbache	(Guinea-Bissau) Diamantino Iuna Fafé	(Egypt) Gamal Mohamed (South Africa) Jakobo Tau
61 kg	(Algeria) Abdelghani Benatallah	(Egypt) Yousef Mohamed Yousef Eissa	(Morocco) Chakir Ansari
65 kg	(Guinea-Bissau) Mbunde Cumba Mbali	(Nigeria) Amas Daniel	(Egypt) Fathi Tarek Ismail (Algeria) Amar Laissaioui
70 kg	(Tunisia) Haithem Dakhlaoui	(Egypt) Ahmed Mohamed Elsayed Elmadboh	(Algeria) Ibrahim Mokhtari
74 kg	(Nigeria) Ogbonna John	(Algeria) Ishak Boukhors	(Tunisia) Maher Ghanmi (Egypt) Amr Reda Hussen
79 kg	(Tunisia) Ayoub Barraj	(Egypt) Saifeldin Elkoumy	(Algeria) Mohammed Boudraa
86 kg	(Egypt) Khaled El-Moatamadawi	(Madagascar) Roman Manitra Raharison	(Algeria) Fateh Benferdjallah (Nigeria) Ekerekeme Agiomor
92 kg	(Algeria) Mohammed Fardj	(Tunisia) Imed Kaddidi	(Egypt) Mohamed Abdalla
97 kg	(Tunisia) Mohamed Saadaoui	(South Africa) Martin Erasmus	(Nigeria) Soso Tamarau (Angola) Francisco Nkunga Ngonda
125 kg	(Egypt) Diaaeldin Kamal	(Algeria) Djahid Berrahal	(South Africa) Johannes Jacobus Kriel

=== Men's Greco-Roman ===
Event	Gold	Silver	Bronze
55 kg	(Algeria) Abdelkarim Fergat	(Namibia) Romio Goliath	(Egypt) Youssef Thabet
60 kg	(Egypt) Haithem Mahmoud	(Algeria) Abdennour Laouni	(Morocco) Abderrazak Rouinbi
63 kg	(Algeria) Abdeldjebar Djebbari	(Egypt) Mostafa Mohamed	(South Africa) Hamed Tchoufon
67 kg	(Egypt) Mohamed Ibrahim El-Sayed	(Algeria) Ishak Ghaiou	(Tunisia) Radhwen Tarhouni
72 kg	(Egypt) Mohamed Abouhalima	(Tunisia) Lamjed Maafi	(Algeria) Tarek Benaissa
77 kg	(Algeria) Abdelkrim Ouakali	(Egypt) Wael Abdelrahman	(Tunisia) Mohamed Landolsi
82 kg	(Algeria) Chawki Doulache	(Tunisia) Ghaith Hannachi	(Egypt) Mohamed Selim
87 kg	(Algeria) Bachir Sid Azara	(Egypt) Mohamed Metwally	(Tunisia) Mohamed Missaoui
97 kg	(Algeria) Adem Boudjemline	(Tunisia) Haikel Achouri	(Egypt) Noureldin Hassan
130 kg	(Egypt) Abdellatif Mohamed	(Tunisia) Amine Guennichi	(Algeria) Hichem Kouchit

=== Women's freestyle ===
Event	Gold	Silver	Bronze
50 kg	(Nigeria) Mercy Genesis	(Egypt) Nada Medani	(Algeria) Ibtissem Doudou (Tunisia) Sarra Hamdi
53 kg	(Cameroon) Joseph Essombe	(Nigeria) Bose Samuel	(Egypt) Kholod Ahmed
55 kg	(Nigeria) Esther Kolawole	(Tunisia) Dorssaf Gharssi	(Egypt) Faten Ahmed
57 kg	(Nigeria) Odunayo Adekuoroye	(Egypt) Eman Ebrahim	(Tunisia) Siwar Bousetta
59 kg	(Nigeria) Bisola Makanjuola	(Egypt) Fatma Elkeliny	(Tunisia) Khouloud El Ouni
62 kg	(Tunisia) Marwa Amri	(Nigeria) Aminat Adeniyi	(Cameroon) Berthe Etane Ngolle
65 kg	(Nigeria) Hannah Rueben	(Algeria) Amel Hammiche	(Tunisia) Lilia Mejri
68 kg	(Nigeria) Blessing Oborududu	(Senegal) Anta Sambou	(Tunisia) Rihem Ayari
72 kg	(Tunisia) Zaineb Sghaier	(Nigeria) Sunmisola Balogun	(Egypt) Eman Mohamed
76 kg	(Egypt) Samar Amer	(Nigeria) Blessing Onyebuchi	(Burkina Faso) Yvette Zié
