= Wrestling at the 2018 Commonwealth Games – Men's freestyle 97 kg =

Wrestling – Men's freestyle 97 kg at the 2018 Commonwealth Games
- Venue: Carrara Sports and Leisure Centre
- Dates: 13 April 2018
- Competitors: 11 from 11 nations

Medalists
gold medal	Martin Erasmus	South Africa
silver medal	Mausam Khatri	India
bronze medal	Alexios Kaouslidis	Cyprus
bronze medal	Jordan Steen	Canada

The men's 97 kg freestyle wrestling competition at the 2018 Commonwealth Games in Gold Coast, Australia was held on 13 April at the Carrara Sports and Leisure Centre.

This freestyle wrestling competition consists of a single-elimination tournament, with a repechage used to determine the winner of two bronze medals. The two finalists face off for gold and silver medals. Each wrestler who loses to one of the two finalists moves into the repechage, culminating in a pair of bronze medal matches featuring the semifinal losers each facing the remaining repechage opponent from their half of the bracket.

== Results ==
Legend

F — Won by fall

=== Main bracket ===
Round of 16
Leon Rattigan (ENG)	0
Jordan Steen (CAN)	10
Joe Hendry (SCO)	0
Nicolaas Verreynne (AUS)	5^{F}
Martin Erasmus (RSA)	10
Sam Belkin (NZL)	0

Quarterfinals
Alexios Kaouslidis (CYP)	0
Mausam Khatri (IND)	12
Cedric Nyamsi (CMR)	1
Soso Tamarau (NGR)	12
Umair Ahmad (PAK)	0
Jordan Steen (CAN)	11
Nicolaas Verreynne (AUS)	1
Martin Erasmus (RSA)	12

Semifinals
Mausam Khatri (IND)	10
Soso Tamarau (NGR)	7
Jordan Steen (CAN)	2
Martin Erasmus (RSA)	12

Final
Mausam Khatri (IND)	2
Martin Erasmus (RSA)	12

=== Repechage ===
Repechage round
Sam Belkin (NZL)	7
Nicolaas Verreynne (AUS)	3

Bronze medal match
Alexios Kaouslidis (CYP)	2
Soso Tamarau (NGR)	1
Sam Belkin (NZL)	0
Jordan Steen (CAN)	10
