= Chakir Ansari =

Moroccan freestyle wrestler

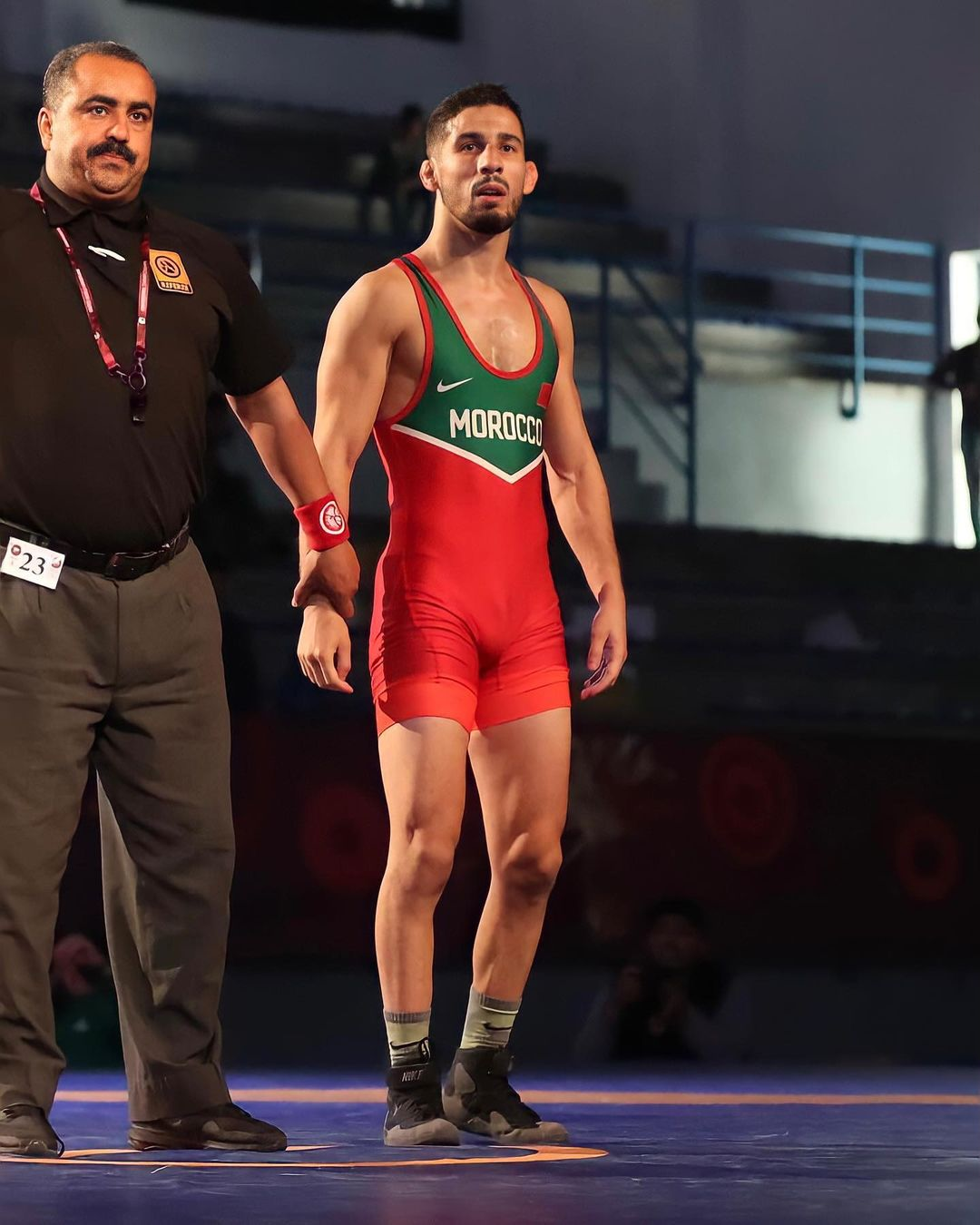

Personal information
- Nationality: Morocco France
- Born: June 22, 1991 (age 35) Clermont Ferrand, Auvergne, France
- Height: 169 cm (5 ft 7 in)
- Weight: 57 kg (126 lb)

Sport
- Sport: Wrestling
- Event: Freestyle
- Club: ASM Clermont Auvergne
- Coached by: Rodolphe Kreutzer, Hassan Rangraz, Serguei Rondón
Medal record
Men's freestyle wrestling
Representing Morocco
2019 African Games
Bronze medal – third place	Rabat 2019	57 kg
African Wrestling Championships
Bronze medal – third place	Algiers 2020	61 kg
Silver medal – second place	Hammamet 2019	57 kg
Gold medal – first place	Marrakech 2017	57 kg
Bronze medal – third place	Alexandria 2015	57 kg
2016 African & Oceania Wrestling Olympic Qualification Tournament
Silver medal – second place	Alger 2016	57 kg
Arab Championships
Gold medal – first place	El Jadida 2015	57 kg
Mediterranean Championship
Gold medal – first place	Kanjiza 2014	57 kg

Chakir Ansari (Arabic: شاكير أنصاري; born June 22, 1991) is a Moroccan freestyle wrestler. He is the first Moroccan freestyle wrestler qualified in Olympic Games. He competed in the men's freestyle 57 kg event at the 2016 Summer Olympics, in which he was eliminated in the round of 32 by Asadulla Lachinau. He won the African title in Marrakech 2017. In 2021, he competed at the 2021 African & Oceania Wrestling Olympic Qualification Tournament hoping to qualify for the 2020 Summer Olympics in Tokyo, Japan.

== Major results ==
Year	Tournament	Location	Result	Event
Representing France
2012	European Championships	Belgrade, Serbia	16th	Freestyle 55 kg
2014	Mediterranean Championships	Kanjiža, Serbia	1st	Freestyle 57 kg
Representing Morocco
2015	African Championships	Alexandria, Egypt	3rd	Freestyle 57 kg
2015	World Championships	Las Vegas, United States	33rd	Freestyle 57 kg
2015	Arab Championships	El Jadida, Morocco	1st	Freestyle 57 kg
2016	Olympic Games	Rio de Janeiro, Brazil	13th	Freestyle 57 kg
2017	African Championships	Marrakesh, Morocco	1st	Freestyle 57 kg
2017	Islamic Solidarity Games	Baku, Azerbaijan	7th	Freestyle 57 kg
2017	World Championships	Paris, France	25th	Freestyle 57 kg
2018	African Championships	Port Harcourt, Nigeria	5th	Freestyle 57 kg
2019	African Championships	Hammamet, Tunisia	2nd	Freestyle 57 kg
2019	African Games	Rabat-El Jadida, Morocco	3rd	Freestyle 57 kg
2019	World Championships	Nur-Sultan, Kazakhstan	24th	Freestyle 57 kg
2020	African Championships	Algiers, Algeria	3rd	Freestyle 61 kg

== See also ==
- Morocco at the 2016 Summer Olympics
- Wrestling at the 2016 Summer Olympics
- 2015 World Wrestling Championships – Men's freestyle 57 kg
