= 2014 African Wrestling Championships =

2014 African Championship
- Host city: Tunis, Tunisia
- Dates: 28–30 March

Champions
- Freestyle: Tunisia
- Greco-Roman: Tunisia
- Women: Nigeria

The 2014 African Wrestling Championships was held in Tunis, Tunisia from 28 to 30 March 2014.

== Medal table ==
* Host nation (Tunisia)

Rank	Nation	Gold	Silver	Bronze	Total
1	Tunisia (TUN)*	7	7	5	19
2	Egypt (EGY)	6	2	4	12
3	Nigeria (NGR)	4	2	4	10
4	Algeria (ALG)	3	3	4	10
5	Senegal (SEN)	2	2	4	8
6	Cameroon (CMR)	1	3	4	8
7	Guinea-Bissau (GBS)	1	0	2	3
8	Morocco (MAR)	0	2	1	3
9	South Africa (RSA)	0	1	2	3
10	Sierra Leone (SLE)	0	1	1	2
11	Madagascar (MAD)	0	1	0	1
12	Chad (CHA)	0	0	3	3
13	Congo (CGO)	0	0	2	2
14	Namibia (NAM)	0	0	1	1
Totals (14 entries)		24	24	37	85

=== Team ranking ===
Rank	Men's freestyle		Women's freestyle		Men's Greco-Roman	
Rank	Team	Points	Team	Points	Team	Points
1	Tunisia	67	Nigeria	67	Tunisia	73
2	Egypt	53	Tunisia	61	Morocco	58
3	Nigeria	51	Cameroon	53	Egypt	55
4	Algeria	50	Senegal	44	Algeria	45
5	Senegal	38	Chad	26	Chad	26
6	Morocco	38	Egypt	18	Republic of the Congo	22
7	Cameroon	35	South Africa	17	Sierra Leone	8
8	South Africa	27	Sierra Leone	9	South Africa	7
9	Chad	21	Guinea-Bissau	8		
10	Guinea-Bissau	18	Republic of the Congo	6		
11	Republic of the Congo	12	Ivory Coast	6		
12	Namibia	11				
13	Madagascar	9				
14	Mauritius	4				

== Medal summary ==
=== Men's freestyle ===
Event	Gold	Silver	Bronze
57 kg	(Nigeria) Ebikewenimo Welson	(Algeria) Abdelhak Kherbache	(Cameroon) Arnaud Essindi Sengui
57 kg	(Nigeria) Ebikewenimo Welson	(Algeria) Abdelhak Kherbache	(Tunisia) Mathlouthi Chedli
61 kg	(Senegal) Jean Bernard Diatta	(Tunisia) Heitham Belaiyech	(South Africa) Marno Plaatjies
61 kg	(Senegal) Jean Bernard Diatta	(Tunisia) Heitham Belaiyech	(Egypt) Abdelaziz Ahmed Saied
65 kg	(Algeria) Nassrallah Lallouche	(Madagascar) Mahatia Tinaihi Razafimanoka	(Cameroon) Tengoh Alain Mbegham
65 kg	(Algeria) Nassrallah Lallouche	(Madagascar) Mahatia Tinaihi Razafimanoka	(Tunisia) Maher Ghanmi
70 kg	(Egypt) Ayed Ibrahim	(Tunisia) Ali Ayari	(Guinea-Bissau) Quintino Intipe
70 kg	(Egypt) Ayed Ibrahim	(Tunisia) Ali Ayari	(Algeria) Mohamed Boudraa
74 kg	(Guinea-Bissau) Augusto Midana	(South Africa) Gerald Meyer	(Tunisia) Borhen Ayachi
74 kg	(Guinea-Bissau) Augusto Midana	(South Africa) Gerald Meyer	(Senegal) Camara Bassizou
86 kg	(Egypt) Mohamed Zaghloul	(Algeria) Medriad Louafi	(South Africa) Armando Hietbrink
86 kg	(Egypt) Mohamed Zaghloul	(Algeria) Medriad Louafi	(Nigeria) Agala Opukiri
97 kg	(Nigeria) Soso Tamarau	(Tunisia) Mohamed Saadawi	(Algeria) Lounès Bouzid
97 kg	(Nigeria) Soso Tamarau	(Tunisia) Mohamed Saadawi	(Namibia) Angola Mateus Shikongo
125 kg	(Tunisia) Slim Trabelsi	(Egypt) Ahmed Othman	(Nigeria) Siniye Boltic
125 kg	(Tunisia) Slim Trabelsi	(Egypt) Ahmed Othman	(Senegal) Faye Thiaka

=== Men's Greco-Roman ===
Event	Gold	Silver	Bronze
59 kg	(Egypt) Haithem Mahmoud	(Morocco) Fouad Fajari	(Algeria) Bilel Ben Brih
66 kg	(Algeria) Tarek Benaissa	(Tunisia) Yassine Ben Nasser	(Egypt) Sayed Abdelmoneim
66 kg	(Algeria) Tarek Benaissa	(Tunisia) Yassine Ben Nasser	(Republic of the Congo) Noel Mbouma
71 kg	(Algeria) Akrem Boudjemline	(Tunisia) Hakym Trabelsi	(Egypt) Ayad Ibrahim
71 kg	(Algeria) Akrem Boudjemline	(Tunisia) Hakym Trabelsi	(Republic of the Congo) Borcel Boukaka
75 kg	(Tunisia) Zied Ayet Ikram	(Algeria) Abdelkrim Ouakali	(Sierra Leone) Abdulai Salam
80 kg	(Egypt) Mohamed Moustafa	(Tunisia) Mohamed Missaoui	(Algeria) Adem Boudjemline
85 kg	(Tunisia) Haykel Achouri	(Egypt) Mohamed Zaghloul	(Morocco) Hamza Boumadiene
98 kg	(Egypt) Ahmed Othman	(Tunisia) Hassine Ayari	(Chad) Djackna Malick
130 kg	(Tunisia) Radhouane Chebbi	(Morocco) Anas El Mbker	(Chad) Basile Dieudonnie

=== Women's freestyle ===
Event	Gold	Silver	Bronze
48 kg	(Tunisia) Marwa Mizieni	(Cameroon) Rebecca Muambo	(Senegal) Nahamy Sambou
53 kg	(Senegal) Isabelle Sambou	(Nigeria) Odunayo Adekuoroye	(Tunisia) Salma Jemai
55 kg	(Tunisia) Marwa Amri	(Nigeria) Makanjuola Bisola	(Cameroon) Joseph Essombe
58 kg	(Tunisia) Hela Riabi	(Senegal) Safietou Goudiaby	(Nigeria) Patience Opuene
58 kg	(Tunisia) Hela Riabi	(Senegal) Safietou Goudiaby	(Cameroon) Edwige Ngono Eyia
60 kg	(Nigeria) Aminat Adeniyi	(Senegal) Anta Sambou	(Tunisia) Rim Ayari
63 kg	(Nigeria) Blessing Oborududu	(Cameroon) Blandine Metala Epanga	(Guinea-Bissau) Jacira Mendonca
63 kg	(Nigeria) Blessing Oborududu	(Cameroon) Blandine Metala Epanga	(Senegal) Binta Senghor
69 kg	(Egypt) Enas Mostafa	(Cameroon) Angele Tomo	(Nigeria) Ifeoma Iheanacito
75 kg	(Cameroon) Annabelle Ali	(Sierra Leone) Hajaratu Kamara	(Egypt) Nadia Anter Yacine
75 kg	(Cameroon) Annabelle Ali	(Sierra Leone) Hajaratu Kamara	(Chad) Harouni Fatime
