= Ogbonna John =

Nigerian freestyle wrestler (born 1997)

Personal information
- Full name: Ogbonna Emmanuel John
- Born: 3 December 1997 (age 28)

Sport
- Country: Nigeria
- Sport: Amateur wrestling
- Weight class: 74 kg
- Event: Freestyle
Medal record
Men's freestyle wrestling
Representing Nigeria
Commonwealth Games
Bronze medal – third place	2022 Birmingham	74 kg
African Games
Gold medal – first place	2019 Rabat	74 kg
African Championships
Gold medal – first place	2017 Marrakesh	70 kg
Gold medal – first place	2018 Port Harcourt	70 kg
Gold medal – first place	2019 Hammamet	74 kg
Gold medal – first place	2020 Algiers	74 kg
Bronze medal – third place	2022 El Jadida	74 kg

Ogbonna Emmanuel John (born 3 December 1997) is a Nigerian freestyle wrestler. He is a gold medalist at the African Games and a four-time gold medalist at the African Wrestling Championships. He is also a bronze medalist at the Commonwealth Games.

== Career ==
At the African Wrestling Championships he won the gold medal in his event four times: in 2017 and 2018 (in the weight class 70 kg) and in 2019 and 2020 (in the weight class 74 kg).

John was eliminated in his first match in both the 70 kg event at the 2017 World Wrestling Championships in Paris, France and in the 74 kg event at the 2019 World Wrestling Championships in Nur-Sultan, Kazakhstan. In 2019, he represented Nigeria at the African Games held in Rabat, Morocco and he won the gold medal in the men's freestyle 74 kg event.

In 2021, John won a gold medal at the Baraza Champion of Champions wrestling tournament held in Yenagoa, Bayelsa State, Nigeria. A few months later, he competed at the African & Oceania Olympic Qualification Tournament hoping to qualify for the 2020 Summer Olympics in Tokyo, Japan. He lost his first match against Amr Reda Hussen of Egypt which meant that he could no longer qualify for the Olympics at this tournament. He also failed to qualify for the Olympics at the World Olympic Qualification Tournament held in Sofia, Bulgaria.

John won one of the bronze medals in his event at the 2022 African Wrestling Championships held in El Jadida, Morocco. He won one of the bronze medals in the men's 74 kg event at the 2022 Commonwealth Games held in Birmingham, England.

== Achievements ==
Year	Tournament	Venue	Result	Event
2017	African Wrestling Championships	Marrakesh, Morocco	1st	Freestyle 70 kg
2018	African Wrestling Championships	Port Harcourt, Nigeria	1st	Freestyle 70 kg
2019	African Wrestling Championships	Hammamet, Tunisia	1st	Freestyle 74 kg
2019	African Games	Rabat, Morocco	1st	Freestyle 74 kg
2020	African Wrestling Championships	Algiers, Algeria	1st	Freestyle 74 kg
2022	African Wrestling Championships	El Jadida, Morocco	3rd	Freestyle 74 kg
2022	Commonwealth Games	Birmingham, England	3rd	Freestyle 74 kg
