= Ebikewenimo Welson =

Nigerian freestyle wrestler

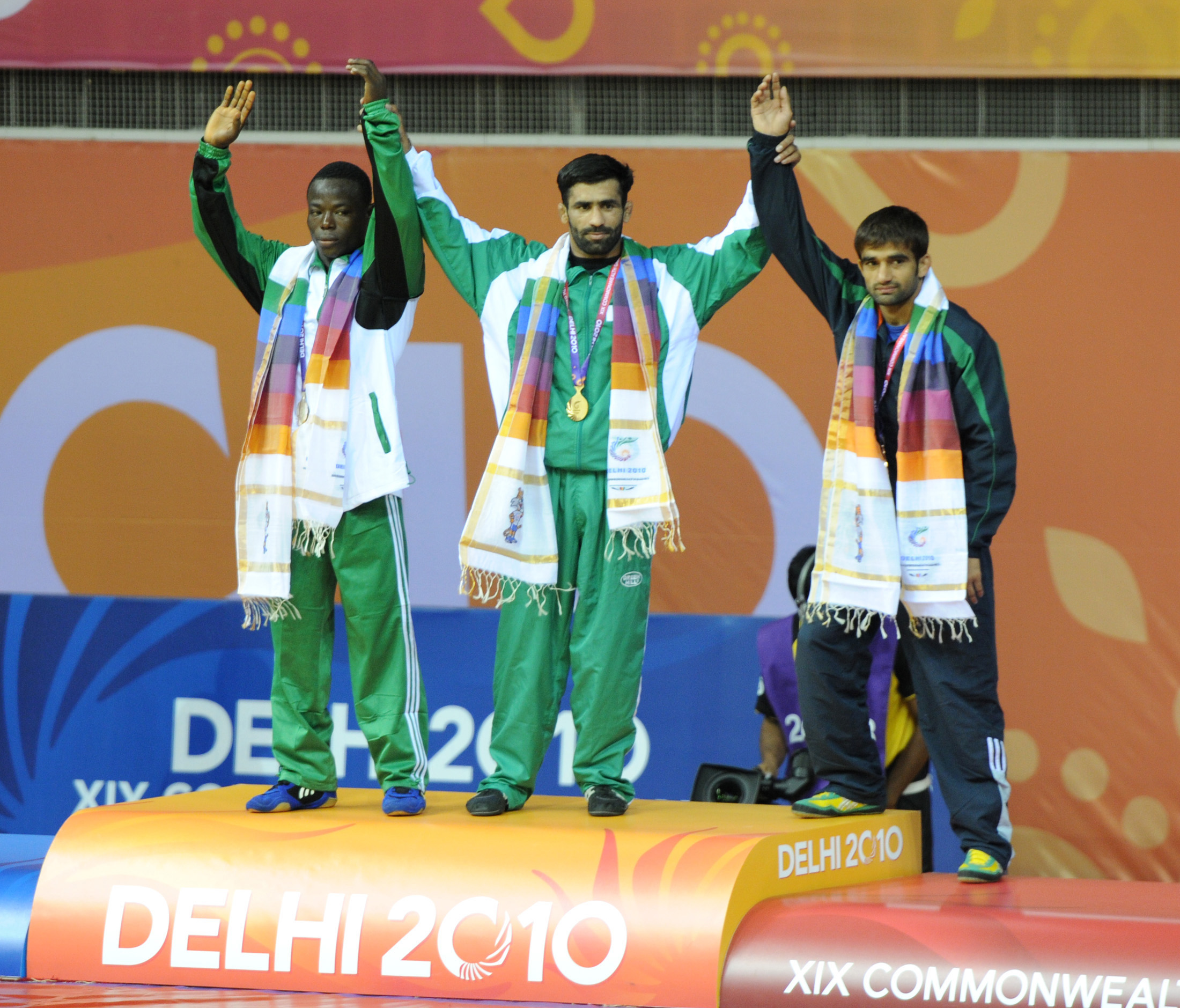
- Welson (left) at the 2010 Commonwealth Games

Personal information
- Born: 11 November 1992 (age 34)

Sport
- Country: Nigeria
- Sport: Amateur wrestling
- Weight class: 57 kg
- Event: Freestyle
Medal record
Men's freestyle wrestling
Representing Nigeria
Commonwealth Games
| Silver medal – second place | 2010 New Delhi | 55 kg |
| Silver medal – second place | 2014 Glasgow | 57 kg |
| Silver medal – second place | 2022 Birmingham | 57 kg |
| Bronze medal – third place | 2018 Gold Coast | 57 kg |
African Games
| Silver medal – second place | 2019 Rabat | 57 kg |
| Bronze medal – third place | 2015 Brazzaville | 57 kg |
African Championships
| Gold medal – first place | 2014 Tunis | 57 kg |
| Silver medal – second place | 2016 Alexandria | 57 kg |
| Silver medal – second place | 2018 Port Harcourt | 57 kg |
| Silver medal – second place | 2022 El Jadida | 57 kg |

Ebikewenimo Welson (born 22 November 1992) is a Nigerian freestyle wrestler. He is a four-time medalist at the Commonwealth Games and a two-time medalist at the African Games.

== Career ==
Welson won four medals at the Commonwealth Games: in 2010, he won the silver medal in the men's 55 kg event and he repeated this in 2014 with the silver medal in the men's 57 kg event. In 2018, he won one of the bronze medals in the men's 57 kg event. He won the silver medal in the men's 57 kg event at the 2022 Commonwealth Games.

Welson represented Nigeria at the 2019 African Games held in Rabat, Morocco and he won the silver medal in the men's 57 kg event.

Welson won the gold medal in the men's 57 kg event at the 2014 African Wrestling Championships and the silver medal in that event at the 2016 African Wrestling Championships. At the 2018 African Wrestling Championships held in Port Harcourt, Nigeria, he also won the silver medal in the men's 57 kg event. He was unable to compete at the 2019 African Wrestling Championships due to injury.

In 2021, Welson won a gold medal at the Baraza Champion of Champions wrestling tournament held in Yenagoa, Bayelsa State, Nigeria. A few months later, he competed at the 2021 African & Oceania Wrestling Olympic Qualification Tournament hoping to qualify for the 2020 Summer Olympics in Tokyo, Japan.

Welson won the silver medal in his event at the 2022 African Wrestling Championships held in El Jadida, Morocco. He won the silver medal in the men's 57 kg event at the 2022 Commonwealth Games held in Birmingham, England.

== Achievements ==
| Year | Tournament | Location | Result | Event |
|---|---|---|---|---|
| 2010 | Commonwealth Games | New Delhi, India | 2nd | Freestyle 55 kg |
| 2014 | African Championships | Tunis, Tunisia | 1st | Freestyle 57 kg |
| 2014 | Commonwealth Games | Glasgow, Scotland | 2nd | Freestyle 57 kg |
| 2015 | African Games | Brazzaville, Republic of the Congo | 3rd | Freestyle 57 kg |
| 2016 | African Championships | Alexandria, Egypt | 2nd | Freestyle 57 kg |
| 2018 | African Championships | Port Harcourt, Nigeria | 2nd | Freestyle 57 kg |
| 2018 | Commonwealth Games | Gold Coast, Australia | 3rd | Freestyle 57 kg |
| 2019 | African Games | Rabat, Morocco | 2nd | Freestyle 57 kg |
| 2022 | African Championships | El Jadida, Morocco | 2nd | Freestyle 57 kg |
| 2022 | Commonwealth Games | Birmingham, England | 2nd | Freestyle 57 kg |
