= Ayoub Barraj =

Tunisian freestyle wrestler

Personal information
- Born: 27 May 1997 (age 29)

Sport
- Country: Tunisia
- Sport: Amateur wrestling
- Event: Freestyle
Medal record
Men's freestyle wrestling
Representing Tunisia
African Games
Gold medal – first place	2019 Rabat	86 kg
African Championships
Gold medal – first place	2018 Port Harcourt	74 kg
Gold medal – first place	2019 Hammamet	79 kg
Gold medal – first place	2020 Algiers	79 kg
Bronze medal – third place	2015 Alexandria	74 kg

Ayoub Barraj (born 27 May 1997) is a Tunisian freestyle wrestler. At the African Wrestling Championships he won a total of four medals: three gold medals and one bronze medal.

== Career ==
He represented Tunisia at the 2014 Summer Youth Olympics in Nanjing, China without winning a medal. He finished in fifth place in the boys' freestyle 76 kg event. In 2015, he won one of the bronze medals in the 74 kg event at the African Wrestling Championships held in Alexandria, Egypt.

In 2018, he won the gold medal in the 74 kg event at the African Wrestling Championships held in Port Harcourt, Nigeria. He also won the gold medal in the 79 kg event in 2019 and 2020.

He represented Tunisia at the 2019 African Games held in Rabat, Morocco and he won the gold medal in the men's freestyle 86 kg event. In the final, he defeated Fateh Benferdjallah of Algeria. In the same year, he also competed in the men's freestyle 79 kg event at the 2019 World Wrestling Championships held in Nur-Sultan, Kazakhstan where he was eliminated in his first match by Tajmuraz Salkazanov of Slovakia. Salkazanov went on to win one of the bronze medals.

In 2020, he competed in the men's 79 kg event at the Individual Wrestling World Cup held in Belgrade, Serbia. In 2021, he competed at the African & Oceania Olympic Qualification Tournament hoping to qualify for the 2020 Summer Olympics in Tokyo, Japan. He did not qualify as he lost his first match against Augusto Midana of Guinea-Bissau. He also failed to qualify for the Olympics at the World Olympic Qualification Tournament held in Sofia, Bulgaria.

== Achievements ==
Year	Tournament	Venue	Result	Event
2015	African Wrestling Championships	Alexandria, Egypt	3rd	Freestyle 74 kg
2018	African Wrestling Championships	Port Harcourt, Nigeria	1st	Freestyle 74 kg
2019	African Wrestling Championships	Hammamet, Tunisia	1st	Freestyle 79 kg
2019	African Games	Rabat, Morocco	1st	Freestyle 86 kg
2020	African Wrestling Championships	Algiers, Algeria	1st	Freestyle 79 kg
