= Bisola Makanjuola =

Nigerian freestyle wrestler (born 1996)

Sport
- Country: Nigeria
- Sport: Amateur wrestling
- Event: Freestyle
Medal record
Women's freestyle wrestling
Representing Nigeria
African Wrestling Championships
Silver medal – second place	2014 Tunis	55 kg
Silver medal – second place	2017 Marrakech	60 kg
Gold medal – first place	2018 Port Harcourt	59 kg
Gold medal – first place	2020 Alger	59 kg

Bisola Makanjuola (born 29 August 1996) is a Nigerian freestyle wrestler. She won two silver and two gold medals in the African Championship between 2014 and 2020.

== Sports career ==
Bisola first win at the African Championship was in 2014 in Tunis where she competed in the 55 kilo category and earned a silver medal. In 2017, she participated at the same event but this time held in Marrakech, Morocco and also won a silver medal in the 60 kg category.

At the 2018 African Wrestling Championship held in Port Harcourt, Makanjuola defeated her opponent and came first in the 59 kg winning the gold medal.

The 2020 African Wrestling Championship competition at Algiers also ended with her victory as Makanjuola won the gold medal for the 59 kg category.
