= Martin Erasmus =

South African freestyle wrestler

Personal information
- Born: 28 March 1995 (age 31)

Sport
- Country: South Africa
- Sport: Amateur wrestling
- Weight class: 97 kg
- Event: Freestyle
Medal record
Commonwealth Games
Gold medal – first place	2018 Gold Coast	97 kg
African Championships
Gold medal – first place	2018 Port Harcourt	97 kg
Silver medal – second place	2015 Alexandria	97 kg
Silver medal – second place	2016 Alexandria	97 kg
Silver medal – second place	2017 Marrakesh	97 kg
Silver medal – second place	2020 Algiers	97 kg

Martin Erasmus (born 28 March 1995) is a South African freestyle wrestler. He won the gold medal in the men's 97 kg event at the 2018 Commonwealth Games held in Gold Coast, Australia.

At the 2018 African Wrestling Championships held in Port Harcourt, Nigeria, he won the gold medal in the men's freestyle 97 kg event. He also won the silver medal in this competition at the African Wrestling Championships in 2015, 2016, 2017 and 2020.

In 2021, he competed at the African & Oceania Olympic Qualification Tournament hoping to qualify for the 2020 Summer Olympics in Tokyo, Japan.
