= Fouad Fajari =

Moroccan Greco-Roman wrestler

Personal information
- Born: 18 April 1989 (age 37) Rabat, Morocco
- Height: 1.66 m (5 ft 5 1/2 in)
- Weight: 55 kg (121 lb)

Sport
- Country: Morocco
- Sport: Wrestling
- Event: Greco-Roman -55kg
Medal record
Representing Morocco
Men's Greco-Roman wrestling
African Games
Silver medal – second place	2019 Rabat-El Jadida	60 kg
Mediterranean Games
Bronze medal – third place	2013 Mersin	55 kg
African Championships
Silver medal – second place	2014 Tunis	59 kg
Bronze medal – third place	2013 N'Djamena	55 kg
Bronze medal – third place	2016 Alexandria	59 kg
Bronze medal – third place	2018 Port Harcourt	63 kg
Bronze medal – third place	2019 Hammamet	63 kg

Fouad Fajari (born 18 April 1989, in Rabat) is a Moroccan Greco-Roman wrestler. He is multiple medalist at the African Championships in the 55 kg category. At the 2013 Mediterranean Games won bronze medal. He competed in the -55kg event at the 2012 Summer Olympics in London, where he was defeated in the 1/8 finals by Håkan Nyblom from Denmark. In 2021, he competed at the 2021 African & Oceania Wrestling Olympic Qualification Tournament hoping to qualify for the 2020 Summer Olympics in Tokyo, Japan. He did not qualify at this tournament and he also failed to qualify for the Olympics at the World Olympic Qualification Tournament held in Sofia, Bulgaria.

== Major results ==
Year	Tournament	Venue	Result	Event
2010	Mediterranean Championships	Istanbul, Turkey	5th	Greco-Roman 55 kg
2010	African Championships	Cairo, Egypt	5th	Greco-Roman 55 kg
2010	Arab Championships	Doha, Qatar	2nd	Greco-Roman 55 kg
2011	Pan Arab Games	Doha, Qatar	5th	Greco-Roman 55 kg
2012	Olympic Games	(United Kingdom) London, Great Britain	19th	Greco-Roman 55 kg
2013	African Championships	N'Djamena, Chad	3rd	Greco-Roman 55 kg
2013	Mediterranean Games	Mersin, Turkey	3rd	Greco-Roman 55 kg
2013	World Championships	Budapest, Hungary	33rd	Greco-Roman 55 kg
2014	African Championships	Tunis, Tunisia	2nd	Greco-Roman 59 kg
2014	African Championships	Tunis, Tunisia	5th	Freestyle 65 kg
2014	World Championships	Tashkent, Uzbekistan	31st	Greco-Roman 59 kg
2015	African Championships	Alexandria, Egypt	5th	Greco-Roman 66 kg
2016	African Championships	Alexandria, Egypt	3rd	Greco-Roman 59 kg
2016	African Championships	Alexandria, Egypt	9th	Freestyle 65 kg
2018	African Championships	Port Harcourt, Nigeria	3rd	Greco-Roman 63 kg
2018	World Championships	Budapest, Hungary	20th	Greco-Roman 63 kg
2019	African Championships	Hammamet, Tunisia	3rd	Greco-Roman 63 kg
2019	African Games	Rabat-El Jadida, Morocco	2nd	Greco-Roman 60 kg
2019	World Championships	Nur-Sultan, Kazakhstan	27th	Greco-Roman 60 kg
