= Bose Samuel =

Nigerian freestyle wrestler

Sport
- Country: Nigeria
- Sport: Amateur wrestling
- Weight class: 53 kg
- Event: Freestyle
Medal record
Women's freestyle wrestling
Representing Nigeria
African Games
Silver medal – second place	2019 Rabat	53 kg
Commonwealth Games
Bronze medal – third place	2018 Gold Coast	53 kg
African Wrestling Championships
Gold medal – first place	2018 Port Harcourt	53 kg
Silver medal – second place	2017 Marrakesh	53 kg
Silver medal – second place	2020 Algiers	53 kg

Bose Samuel is a Nigerian freestyle wrestler. She is a silver medalist at the African Games and a bronze medalist at the Commonwealth Games.

== Career ==
She won the bronze medal in the women's freestyle 53 kg event at the 2018 Commonwealth Games held in Gold Coast, Australia. In 2019, she represented Nigeria at the African Games held in Rabat, Morocco and she won the silver medal in the women's freestyle 53 kg event.

In 2020, she won the silver medal in the women's freestyle 53 kg event at the African Wrestling Championships held in Algiers, Algeria. She competed at the 2021 African & Oceania Wrestling Olympic Qualification Tournament hoping to qualify for the 2020 Summer Olympics in Tokyo, Japan.

== Major results ==
Year	Tournament	Location	Result	Event
2018	Commonwealth Games	Gold Coast, Australia	3rd	Freestyle 53 kg
2019	African Games	Rabat, Morocco	2nd	Freestyle 53 kg
2020	African Wrestling Championships	Algiers, Algeria	2nd	Freestyle 53 kg
