= Dorssaf Gharssi =

Tunisian freestyle wrestler

Sport
- Country: Tunisia
- Sport: Amateur wrestling
- Event: Freestyle
Medal record
Women's freestyle wrestling
Representing Tunisia
African Championships
Bronze medal – third place	2015 Alexandria	53 kg
Bronze medal – third place	2017 Marrakesh	58 kg
Bronze medal – third place	2018 Port Harcourt	57 kg
Bronze medal – third place	2019 Hammamet	57 kg
Silver medal – second place	2020 Algiers	55 kg

Dorssaf Gharssi is a Tunisian freestyle wrestler. She is a five-time medalist at the African Wrestling Championships. Her best result was the silver medal at the 2020 African Wrestling Championships held in Algiers, Algeria.

== Achievements ==
Year	Tournament	Location	Result	Event
2015	African Wrestling Championships	Alexandria, Egypt	3rd	Freestyle 53 kg
2017	African Wrestling Championships	Marrakesh, Morocco	3rd	Freestyle 58 kg
2018	African Wrestling Championships	Port Harcourt, Nigeria	3rd	Freestyle 57 kg
2019	African Wrestling Championships	Hammamet, Tunisia	3rd	Freestyle 57 kg
2020	African Wrestling Championships	Algiers, Algeria	2nd	Freestyle 55 kg
