= Algeria at the 2020 Summer Olympics =

- IOC code: ALG
- NOC: Algerian Olympic Committee
- Website: www.coa.dz

in Tokyo, Japan July 23, 2021 – August 8, 2021
- Competitors: 41 (28 men and 13 women) in 14 sports
- Flag bearers (opening): Mohamed Flissi; Amel Melih
- Flag bearer (closing): Imane Khelif
- Medals: Gold 0 Silver 0 Bronze 0 Total 0

Summer Olympics appearances (overview)
- 1964; 1968; 1972; 1976; 1980; 1984; 1988; 1992; 1996; 2000; 2004; 2008; 2012; 2016; 2020; 2024; 2028

Other related appearances
- France (1896–1960)

Algeria competed at the 2020 Summer Olympics in Tokyo. Originally scheduled to take place in the summer of 2020, the Games were postponed to 23 July to 8 August 2021, because of the COVID-19 pandemic. Since the nation's debut in 1964, Algerian athletes have appeared in every edition of the Summer Olympic Games, with the exception of the 1976 Summer Olympics in Montreal because of the African boycott. Unlike Algeria's previous successes in the Summer Olympics, they failed to secure a single medal.

== Competitors ==
The following is the list of number of competitors in the Games.

Sport	Men	Women	Total
Athletics	4	1	5
Boxing	5	3	8
Canoeing	0	1	1
Cycling	2	0	2
Fencing	2	2	4
Judo	1	1	2
Karate	0	1	1
Rowing	2	0	2
Sailing	1	1	2
Shooting	0	1	1
Swimming	1	2	3
Table tennis	1	0	1
Weightlifting	1	0	1
Wrestling	8	0	8
Total	28	13	41

== Athletics ==
Algerian athletes achieved the entry standards, either by qualifying time or by world ranking, in the following track and field events (up to a maximum of 3 athletes in each event):

Key

- Note–Ranks given for track events are within the athlete's heat only
- Q = Qualified for the next round
- q = Qualified for the next round as a fastest loser or, in field events, by position without achieving the qualifying target
- NR = National record
- N/A = Round not applicable for the event
- Bye = Athlete not required to compete in round

Track & road events

Athlete	Event	Heat		Semifinal		Final	
Athlete	Event	Result	Rank	Result	Rank	Result	Rank
Yassine Hethat	Men's 800 m	1:46.20	5	Did not advance			
Abdelmalik Lahoulou	Men's 400 m hurdles	48.83 SB	3 Q	49.14	5	Did not advance	
Hicham Bouchicha	Men's 3000 m steeplechase	8.44.75	15	—N/a		Did not advance	
Loubna Benhadja	Women's 400 m hurdles	57.19 PB	8	Did not advance			

Field events

Athlete	Event	Qualification		Final	
Athlete	Event	Distance	Position	Distance	Position
Yasser Triki	Men's triple jump	17.05	5 Q	17.43 NR	5

== Boxing ==
Algeria entered eight boxers (five men and three women) into the Olympic tournament. Mohamed Flissi (men's flyweight), Chouaib Bouloudinat (men's super heavyweight), and three-time Olympian Abdelhafid Benchabla (men's heavyweight), along with four rookies (Nemouchi, Houmri, Boualam, and Khelif), secured their spots by advancing to the final match of their respective weight divisions at the 2020 African Qualification Tournament in Diamniadio, Senegal. Ichrak Chaib completed the nation's boxing lineup by topping the list of eligible boxers from Africa in the women's middleweight division of the IOC's Boxing Task Force Rankings.

Men

Athlete	Event	Round of 32	Round of 16	Quarterfinals	Semifinals	Final	
Athlete	Event	Opposition Result	Opposition Result	Opposition Result	Opposition Result	Opposition Result	Rank
Mohamed Flissi	Flyweight	Bye	Paalam (PHI); L 0–5	Did not advance			
Younes Nemouchi	Middleweight	Ssemujju (UGA); W 5–0	Marcial (PHI); L RSC–I	Did not advance			
Mohammed Houmri	Light heavyweight	Korbaj (VEN); W 3–2	López (CUB); L 0–5	Did not advance			
Abdelhafid Benchabla	Heavyweight	Tursunov (UZB); W 4–1	Gadzhimagomedov (ROC); L 0–5	Did not advance			
Chouaib Bouloudinat	Super heavyweight	Bye	Torrez (USA); L 0–5	Did not advance			

Women

Athlete	Event	Round of 32	Round of 16	Quarterfinals	Semifinals	Final	
Athlete	Event	Opposition Result	Opposition Result	Opposition Result	Opposition Result	Opposition Result	Rank
Roumaysa Boualam	Flyweight	Jitpong (THA); L 0–5	Did not advance				
Imane Khelif	Lightweight	—N/a	Homrani (TUN); W 5–0	Harrington (IRL); L 0–5	Did not advance		
Ichrak Chaib	Middleweight	—N/a	Rani (IND); L 0–5	Did not advance			

== Canoeing ==
=== Sprint ===
Algeria qualified a single boat (women's K-1 200 m) for the Games by receiving a spare berth freed up by South Africa at the 2019 African Games in Rabat, Morocco, marking the country's Olympic debut in this sporting discipline.

Athlete	Event	Heats		Quarterfinals		Semifinals		Final	
Athlete	Event	Time	Rank	Time	Rank	Time	Rank	Time	Rank
Amira Kheris	Women's K-1 200 m	48.306	7 QF	49.412	8	Did not advance			
Amira Kheris	Women's K-1 500 m	2:13.626	7 QF	2:07.548	6	Did not advance			

Qualification Legend: FA = Qualify to final (medal); FB = Qualify to final B (non-medal)

== Cycling ==
=== Road ===
Algeria entered two riders to compete in the men's Olympic road race, by virtue of their top 50 national finish (for men) in the UCI World Ranking.

Athlete	Event	Time	Rank
Azzedine Lagab	Men's road race	Did not finish	
Azzedine Lagab	Men's time trial	1:05:21.53	36
Hamza Mansouri	Men's road race	Did not finish	

== Fencing ==
Algeria entered four fencers into the Olympic competition. Salim Heroui (men's foil), Akram Bounabi (men's sabre), Meriem Mebarki (women's foil), and Kaouther Mohamed Belkebir secured places on the Algerian team with a top finish in their respective individual events at the African Zonal Qualifier in Cairo, Egypt.

Athlete	Event	Round of 64	Round of 32	Round of 16	Quarterfinal	Semifinal	Final / BM	
Athlete	Event	Opposition Score	Opposition Score	Opposition Score	Opposition Score	Opposition Score	Opposition Score	Rank
Salim Heroui	Men's foil	Mylnikov (ROC); L 6–15	Did not advance					
Akram Bounabi	Men's sabre	Streets (JPN); L 9–15	Did not advance					
Meriem Mebarki	Women's foil	Pásztor (HUN); L 8–15	Did not advance					
Kaouther Mohamed Belkebir	Women's sabre	Yang Hy (CHN); L 1–15	Did not advance					

== Judo ==
Algeria qualified two judoka (one per gender) for each of the following weight classes at the Games. Fethi Nourine (men's lightweight, 73 kg) accepted a continental berth from Africa as the nation's top-ranked judoka outside of direct qualifying position based on the IJF World Ranking List of June 28, 2021, with two-time Olympian Sonia Asselah (women's heavyweight, +78 kg) receiving an additional slot to the nation's roster as the next highest-ranked judoka vying for qualification in her assigned weight category.

Fethi Nourine withdrew, saying it was to avoid the prospect of possibly facing an Israeli judoka. If he had won against Mohamed Abdalarasool of Sudan in the round of 64, he would have faced Israeli judoka Tohar Butbul, who was ranked # 5 in the tournament. Nourine withdrew to support Palestine in the Israeli–Palestinian conflict. In response, the International Judo Federation immediately suspended both Nourine and his coach Amar Benikhlef, and sent them back from Tokyo to Algeria. The Federation explained:

"According to the IJF rules, in line with the Olympic Charter and especially with rule 50.2 that provides for the protection of the neutrality of sport at the Olympic Games and the neutrality of the Games themselves, which states that 'no kind of demonstration or political, religious or racial propaganda is permitted in any Olympic sites, venues or other areas,' Fethi Nourine and Amar Benikhlef are now suspended and will face a decision by the IJF Disciplinary Commission, as well as disciplinary sanctions by the National Olympic Committee of Algeria back in their country.'"

It continued: "Judo sport is based on a strong moral code, including respect and friendship, to foster solidarity and we will not tolerate any discrimination, as it goes against the core values and principles of our sport." The Federation Disciplinary Commission will handle final sanctioning beyond the Olympics.

Athlete	Event	Round of 64	Round of 32	Round of 16	Quarterfinals	Semifinals	Repechage	Final / BM	
Athlete	Event	Opposition Result	Opposition Result	Opposition Result	Opposition Result	Opposition Result	Opposition Result	Opposition Result	Rank
Fethi Nourine	Men's −73 kg	Abdalarasool (SUD); L WO	Did not advance						
Sonia Asselah	Women's +78 kg	—N/a	Kalanina (UKR); L 002–100	Did not advance					

== Karate ==
Algeria entered one karateka into the inaugural Olympic tournament. Lamya Matoub secured a place in the women's kumite +61-kg category, as the highest-ranked karateka vying for qualification from the African zone based on the WKD Olympic Rankings.

Athlete	Event	Round robin					Semifinals	Final	
Athlete	Event	Opposition Result	Opposition Result	Opposition Result	Opposition Result	Rank	Opposition Result	Opposition Result	Rank
Lamya Matoub	Women's +61 kg	Quirici (SUI); L 1–2	Abbasali (IRI); L 0–4	Gong L (CHN); L 0–4	Abdelaziz (EGY); D 0–0	5	Did not advance		

== Rowing ==
Algeria qualified one boat in the men's lightweight double sculls for the Games by winning the gold medal and securing an outright berth at the 2019 FISA African Olympic Qualification Regatta in Tunis, Tunisia.

Athlete	Event	Heats		Repechage		Semifinals		Final	
Athlete	Event	Time	Rank	Time	Rank	Time	Rank	Time	Rank
Sid Ali Boudina; Kamel Ait Daoud	Men's lightweight double sculls	6:57.32	6 R	7:12.08	6 FC	Bye		6:41.62	17

Qualification Legend: FA=Final A (medal); FB=Final B (non-medal); FC=Final C (non-medal); FD=Final D (non-medal); FE=Final E (non-medal); FF=Final F (non-medal); SA/B=Semifinals A/B; SC/D=Semifinals C/D; SE/F=Semifinals E/F; QF=Quarterfinals; R=Repechage

== Sailing ==
Algerian sailors qualified one boat in each of the following classes through the class-associated World Championships and the continental regattas.

Athlete	Event	Race													Net points	Final rank
Athlete	Event	1	2	3	4	5	6	7	8	9	10	11	12	M*	Net points	Final rank
Hamza Bouras	Men's RS:X	21	23	24	25	~~DNF~~	18	25	24	25	25	25	25	EL	260	25
Amina Berrichi	Women's RS:X	23	26	24	~~DNF~~	DNF	26	27	27	DNF	27	26	27	EL	289	27

M = Medal race; EL = Eliminated – did not advance into the medal race

== Shooting ==
Algeria received an invitation from ISSF to send a shooter in the women's 10 m air rifle to the Olympics, following the disqualification of Egypt's Shimaa Hashad from the 2019 African Championships over a doping offense. The athlete named to the team must have obtained a minimum qualifying score (MQS) by 31 May 2020

Athlete	Event	Qualification		Final	
Athlete	Event	Points	Rank	Points	Rank
Houda Chaabi	Women's 10 m air rifle	619.5	39	Did not advance	

== Swimming ==
Algerian swimmers further achieved qualifying standards in the following events (up to a maximum of 2 swimmers in each event at the Olympic Qualifying Time (OQT), and potentially 1 at the Olympic Selection Time (OST)):

Athlete	Event	Heat		Semifinal		Final	
Athlete	Event	Time	Rank	Time	Rank	Time	Rank
Oussama Sahnoune	Men's 50 m freestyle	22.61	37	Did not advance			
Oussama Sahnoune	Men's 100 m freestyle	49.65	37	Did not advance			
Souad Cherouati	Women's 10 km open water	—N/a				2:17:21.6	25
Amel Melih	Women's 50 m freestyle	25.77	=35	Did not advance			
Amel Melih	Women's 100 m freestyle	56.65	39	Did not advance			

== Table tennis ==
Algeria entered one athlete into the table tennis competition at the Games. Larbi Bouriah scored a semifinal victory to occupy one of the four available spots in the men's singles at the 2020 African Olympic Qualification Tournament in Tunis, Tunisia.

Athlete	Event	Preliminary	Round 1	Round 2	Round 3	Round of 16	Quarterfinals	Semifinals	Final / BM	
Athlete	Event	Opposition Result	Opposition Result	Opposition Result	Opposition Result	Opposition Result	Opposition Result	Opposition Result	Opposition Result	Rank
Larbi Bouriah	Men's singles	Majoros (HUN); L 0–4	Did not advance							

== Weightlifting ==
Algeria entered one male weightlifter into the Olympic competition. Two-time Olympian Walid Bidani topped the list of weightlifters from Africa in the men's +109 kg category based on the IWF Absolute Continental Rankings.

Athlete	Event	Snatch		Clean & jerk		Total	Rank
Athlete	Event	Result	Rank	Result	Rank	Total	Rank
Walid Bidani	Men's +109 kg	Withdrew ‌‌‌‌‌after testing positive for COVID-19					

== Wrestling ==
Algeria qualified eight wrestlers for each of the following classes into the Olympic competition; all of whom advanced to the top two finals to book Olympic spots in the men's freestyle (57, 86, 97, and 125 kg) and men's Greco-Roman wrestling (60, 67, 87, and 97 kg) at the 2021 African & Oceania Qualification Tournament in Hammamet, Tunisia.

Key:

- VT (ranking points: 5–0 or 0–5) – Victory by fall.
- VB (ranking points: 5–0 or 0–5) – Victory by injury (VF for forfeit, VA for withdrawal or disqualification)
- PP (ranking points: 3–1 or 1–3) – Decision by points – the loser with technical points.
- PO (ranking points: 3–0 or 0–3) – Decision by points – the loser without technical points.
- ST (ranking points: 4–0 or 0–4) – Great superiority – the loser without technical points and a margin of victory of at least 8 (Greco-Roman) or 10 (freestyle) points.
- SP (ranking points: 4–1 or 1–4) – Technical superiority – the loser with technical points and a margin of victory of at least 8 (Greco-Roman) or 10 (freestyle) points.

Freestyle

Athlete	Event	Round of 16	Quarterfinal	Semifinal	Repechage	Final / BM	
Athlete	Event	Opposition Result	Opposition Result	Opposition Result	Opposition Result	Opposition Result	Rank
Abdelhak Kherbache	Men's −57 kg	Vangelov (BUL); L 0–4 ^{ST}	Did not advance				16
Fateh Benferdjallah	Men's −86 kg	Reichmuth (SUI); L 1–3 ^{PP}	Did not advance				11
Mohammed Fardj	Men's −97 kg	Yergali (KAZ); L 0–5 ^{VA}	Did not advance				16
Djahid Berrahal	Men's −125 kg	Shala (KOS); L 0–5 ^{VT}	Did not advance				14

Greco-Roman

Athlete	Event	Qualification	Round of 16	Quarterfinal	Semifinal	Repechage	Final / BM	
Athlete	Event	Opposition Result	Opposition Result	Opposition Result	Opposition Result	Opposition Result	Opposition Result	Rank
Abdelkarim Fergat	Men's −60 kg	—N/a	Funita (JPN); L 0–3 ^{PO}	Did not advance		Walihan (CHN); L 1–3 ^{PP}	Did not advance	13
Abdelmalek Merabet	Men's −67 kg	Ryu H-s (KOR); L 0–4 ^{ST}	Did not advance					16
Bachir Sid Azara	Men's −87 kg	—N/a	Peng F (CHN); W 4–1 ^{SP}	Beleniuk (UKR); L 1–3 ^{PP}	Did not advance	Datunashvili (SRB); L 1–3 ^{PP}	Did not advance	7
Adem Boudjemline	Men's −97 kg	—N/a	Saravi (IRI); L 0–4 ^{ST}	Did not advance				15
