= Samy Moustafa =

Egyptian freestyle wrestler

Personal information
- Born: 13 January 1998 (age 28)
- Height: 178 cm (5 ft 10 in)

Sport
- Country: Egypt
- Sport: Amateur wrestling
- Weight class: 74 kg
- Event: Freestyle
Medal record
Men's freestyle wrestling
Representing Egypt
African Games
Silver medal – second place	2019 Rabat	74 kg
African Championships
Gold medal – first place	2017 Marrakesh	74 kg
Silver medal – second place	2016 Alexandria	74 kg
Silver medal – second place	2018 Port Harcourt	74 kg
Mediterranean Games
Silver medal – second place	2018 Tarragona	74 kg

Samy Moustafa (born 13 January 1998) is an Egyptian freestyle wrestler. He represented Egypt at the 2019 African Games held in Rabat, Morocco and he won the silver medal in the men's freestyle 74 kg event.

In 2017, he won the gold medal in the 74 kg event at the African Wrestling Championships held in Marrakesh, Morocco.
