= Khaled El-Moatamadawi =

Egyptian freestyle wrestler

Sport
- Country: Egypt
- Sport: Amateur wrestling
- Event: Freestyle
Medal record
African Games
Bronze medal – third place	2019 Rabat	86 kg
African Championships
Gold medal – first place	2019 Hammamet	97 kg
Gold medal – first place	2020 Algiers	86 kg

Khaled El-Moatamadawi is an Egyptian freestyle wrestler. He represented Egypt at the 2019 African Games held in Rabat, Morocco and he won one of the bronze medals in the men's freestyle 86 kg event. He is also a two-time gold medalist at the African Wrestling Championships.

== Career ==
At the 2019 African Wrestling Championships held in Hammamet, Tunisia, he won the gold medal in the 97 kg event. In 2020, he won the gold medal in the 86 kg event.

In 2021, he competed at the African & Oceania Olympic Qualification Tournament hoping to qualify for the 2020 Summer Olympics in Tokyo, Japan.

== Achievements ==
Year	Tournament	Venue	Result	Event
2019	African Wrestling Championships	Hammamet, Tunisia	1st	Freestyle 97 kg
2019	African Games	Rabat, Morocco	3rd	Freestyle 86 kg
2020	African Wrestling Championships	Algiers, Algeria	1st	Freestyle 86 kg
