= Haithem Dakhlaoui =

Tunisian freestyle wrestler

Personal information
- Born: 17 November 1994 (age 32)

Sport
- Country: Tunisia
- Sport: Amateur wrestling
- Event: Freestyle
Medal record
Men's freestyle wrestling
Representing Tunisia
African Championships
Gold medal – first place	2020 Algiers	70 kg
Silver medal – second place	2018 Port Harcourt	65 kg

Haithem Dakhlaoui (born 17 November 1994) is a Tunisian freestyle wrestler. He is a two-time medalist at the African Wrestling Championships. He also represented Tunisia at the 2020 Summer Olympics in Tokyo, Japan.

== Career ==
He competed at the 2016 African & Oceania Wrestling Olympic Qualification Tournament hoping to qualify for the 2016 Summer Olympics in Rio de Janeiro, Brazil. He was eliminated in his second match by Jason Afrikaner of Namibia.

In 2018, he won the silver medal in the 65 kg event at the African Wrestling Championships held in Port Harcourt, Nigeria. Two years later, he secured the gold medal in the 70 kg event at the 2020 African Wrestling Championships held in Algiers, Algeria.

He qualified at the 2021 African & Oceania Wrestling Olympic Qualification Tournament to represent Tunisia at the 2020 Summer Olympics in Tokyo, Japan. He competed in the men's 65 kg event.

== Achievements ==
Year	Tournament	Venue	Result	Event
2018	African Wrestling Championships	Port Harcourt, Nigeria	2nd	Freestyle 65 kg
2020	African Wrestling Championships	Algiers, Algeria	1st	Freestyle 70 kg
