= Abdelhak Kherbache =

Algerian freestyle wrestler

Personal information
- Born: 25 June 1995 (age 31)

Sport
- Country: Algeria
- Sport: Amateur wrestling
- Weight class: 57 kg
- Event: Freestyle
Medal record
Men's freestyle wrestling
Representing Algeria
African Games
Gold medal – first place	2019 Rabat	57 kg
Bronze medal – third place	2015 Brazzaville	57 kg
African Championships
Gold medal – first place	2019 Hammamet	57 kg
Gold medal – first place	2020 Algiers	57 kg
Gold medal – first place	2022 El Jadida	61 kg
Gold medal – first place	2023 Hammamet	61 kg
Gold medal – first place	2024 Alexandria	61 kg
Silver medal – second place	2014 Tunis	57 kg
Silver medal – second place	2015 Alexandria	57 kg
Silver medal – second place	2017 Marrakesh	57 kg
Bronze medal – third place	2018 Port Harcourt	57 kg

Abdelhak Kherbache (born 25 June 1995) is an Algerian freestyle wrestler. At the African Wrestling Championships, he won a total of nine medals: five gold, three silver, and one bronze. He is also a two-time medalist, including gold, at the African Games. He competed in the men's 57 kg event at the 2020 Summer Olympics held in Tokyo, Japan.

== Career ==
Kherbache represented Algeria at the 2019 African Games held in Rabat, Morocco, and he won the gold medal in the men's freestyle 57 kg event. Four years earlier, he also competed at the African Games in this event and won one of the bronze medals at the time.

In 2020, Kherbache competed in the men's 57 kg event at the Individual Wrestling World Cup held in Belgrade, Serbia. He qualified at the 2021 African & Oceania Wrestling Olympic Qualification Tournament to represent Algeria at the 2020 Summer Olympics in Tokyo, Japan.

Kherbache won the gold medal in his event at the 2022 African Wrestling Championships held in El Jadida, Morocco. He lost his bronze medal match in the 65 kg event at the 2022 Mediterranean Games held in Oran, Algeria.

== Achievements ==
Year	Tournament	Location	Result	Event
2014	African Championships	Tunis, Tunisia	2nd	Freestyle 57 kg
2015	African Championships	Alexandria, Egypt	2nd	Freestyle 57 kg
2015	African Games	Brazzaville, Republic of the Congo	3rd	Freestyle 57 kg
2017	African Championships	Marrakesh, Morocco	2nd	Freestyle 57 kg
2018	African Championships	Port Harcourt, Nigeria	3rd	Freestyle 57 kg
2019	African Championships	Hammamet, Tunisia	1st	Freestyle 57 kg
2019	African Games	Rabat, Morocco	1st	Freestyle 57 kg
2020	African Championships	Algiers, Algeria	1st	Freestyle 57 kg
2022	African Championships	El Jadida, Morocco	1st	Freestyle 61 kg
2023	African Championships	Hammamet, Tunisia	1st	Freestyle 61 kg
2024	African Championships	Alexandria, Egypt	1st	Freestyle 61 kg
