= Mohamed Metwally =

Egyptian Greco-Roman wrestler

Personal information
- Full name: Mohamed Moustafa Ahmed Abdall Metwally
- Born: 24 August 1995 (age 30)

Sport
- Country: Egypt
- Sport: Amateur wrestling
- Weight class: 87 kg
- Event: Greco-Roman
Medal record
Men's Greco-Roman wrestling
Representing Egypt
African Championships
Gold medal – first place	2017 Marrakesh	85 kg
Gold medal – first place	2019 Hammamet	87 kg
Silver medal – second place	2020 Algiers	87 kg
Bronze medal – third place	2016 Alexandria	85 kg
African Games
Silver medal – second place	2023 Accra	87 kg
Bronze medal – third place	2019 Rabat	87 kg

Mohamed Moustafa Ahmed Abdall Metwally is an Egyptian Greco-Roman wrestler. He represented Egypt at the 2019 African Games held in Rabat, Morocco and he won one of the bronze medals in the 87 kg event.

He qualified at the 2021 African & Oceania Wrestling Olympic Qualification Tournament to represent Egypt at the 2020 Summer Olympics in Tokyo, Japan. He competed in the 87 kg event.

He competed in the 87 kg event at the 2022 World Wrestling Championships held in Belgrade, Serbia. He was eliminated in his first match.

He competed in the 87 kg event at the 2024 Summer Olympics in Paris, France.

== Achievements ==
Year	Tournament	Location	Result	Event
2016	African Wrestling Championships	Alexandria, Egypt	3rd	Greco-Roman 85 kg
2017	African Wrestling Championships	Marrakesh, Morocco	1st	Greco-Roman 85 kg
2019	African Wrestling Championships	Hammamet, Tunisia	1st	Greco-Roman 87 kg
2019	African Games	Rabat, Morocco	3rd	Greco-Roman 87 kg
2020	African Wrestling Championships	Algiers, Algeria	2nd	Greco-Roman 87 kg
2024	African Games	Accra, Ghana	2nd	Greco-Roman 87 kg
