= Souleymen Nasr =

Tunisian Greco-Roman wrestler

Personal information
- Born: 24 February 1997 (age 29)

Sport
- Country: Tunisia
- Sport: Amateur wrestling
- Weight class: 67 kg
- Event: Greco-Roman
Medal record
Men's Greco-Roman wrestling
Representing Tunisia
African Games
Silver medal – second place	2019 Rabat	67 kg
African Championships
Silver medal – second place	2018 Port Harcourt	63 kg
Silver medal – second place	2019 Hammamet	67 kg
Bronze medal – third place	2016 Alexandria	66 kg

Souleymen Nasr (born 24 February 1997) is a Tunisian Greco-Roman wrestler. He represented Tunisia at the 2019 African Games held in Rabat, Morocco and he won the silver medal in the 67 kg event. He is also a three-time medalist at the African Wrestling Championships.

== Career ==
In 2014, he represented Tunisia at the Summer Youth Olympics held in Nanjing, China without winning a medal.

He qualified at the 2021 African & Oceania Wrestling Olympic Qualification Tournament to represent Tunisia at the 2020 Summer Olympics in Tokyo, Japan. He competed in the 67 kg event.

He competed in the 67 kg event at the 2024 Summer Olympics in Paris, France. He was eliminated in his first match.

== Achievements ==
Year	Tournament	Location	Result	Event
2016	African Wrestling Championships	Alexandria, Egypt	3rd	Greco-Roman 66 kg
2018	African Wrestling Championships	Port Harcourt, Nigeria	2nd	Greco-Roman 63 kg
2019	African Wrestling Championships	Hammamet, Tunisia	2nd	Greco-Roman 67 kg
2019	African Games	Rabat, Morocco	2nd	Greco-Roman 67 kg
