= Abdelkarim Fergat =

Algerian Greco-Roman wrestler

Personal information
- Nationality: Algerian
- Born: 2 March 1994 (age 32) Algiers, Algeria

Sport
- Country: Algeria
- Sport: Amateur wrestling
- Weight class: 55 kg
- Event: Greco-Roman
Medal record
Men's Greco-Roman wrestling
Representing Algeria
African Games
Bronze medal – third place	2023 Accra	60 kg
Mediterranean Games
Gold medal – first place	2026 Taranto	60 kg
African Championships
Gold medal – first place	2018 Port Harcourt	55 kg
Gold medal – first place	2019 Hammamet	55 kg
Gold medal – first place	2020 Algiers	55 kg
Gold medal – first place	2022 El Jadida	63 kg
Individual World Cup
Bronze medal – third place	2020 Belgrade	55 kg
World Military Championships
Bronze medal – third place	2025 Warendorf	60 kg

Abdelkarim Fergat (Arabic: عبد الكريم فرقات, born 2 March 1994) is an Algerian Greco-Roman wrestler. He is a four-time gold medalist in his event at the African Wrestling Championships. He also competed at the World Wrestling Championships in 2018, 2019 and 2022.

== Career ==
In 2020, Fergat won one of the bronze medals in the men's 55 kg event at the Individual Wrestling World Cup held in Belgrade, Serbia. He qualified at the 2021 African & Oceania Wrestling Olympic Qualification Tournament to represent Algeria at the 2020 Summer Olympics in Tokyo, Japan. He competed in the men's 60 kg event where he lost his first match against Kenichiro Fumita of Japan. He also lost his next match in the repechage against Walihan Sailike of China. Both of his opponents went on to win a medal in the competition.

In 2022, Fergat won one of the bronze medals in the 60 kg event at the Dan Kolov & Nikola Petrov Tournament held in Veliko Tarnovo, Bulgaria. He won the gold medal in his event at the 2022 African Wrestling Championships held in El Jadida, Morocco.

Fergat competed in the 60 kg event at the 2024 Summer Olympics held in Paris, France. He was eliminated in his first match by Mehdi Mohsennejad of Iran.

== Achievements ==
Year	Tournament	Venue	Result	Event
2018	African Wrestling Championships	Port Harcourt, Nigeria	1st	Greco-Roman 55 kg
2019	African Wrestling Championships	Hammamet, Tunisia	1st	Greco-Roman 55 kg
2020	African Wrestling Championships	Algiers, Algeria	1st	Greco-Roman 55 kg
2022	African Wrestling Championships	El Jadida, Morocco	1st	Greco-Roman 63 kg
2024	African Games	Accra, Ghana	3rd	Greco-Roman 60 kg
2026	Mediterranean Games	Taranto, Italy	1st	Greco-Roman 60 kg
