= Jordan Steen =

Canadian freestyle wrestler

Personal information
- Full name: Jordan David Steen
- Born: 26 June 1991 (age 35) Ottawa, Ontario, Canada
- Height: 180 cm (5 ft 11 in)
- Weight: 97 kg (214 lb)

Sport
- Country: Canada
- Sport: Amateur wrestling
- Event: Freestyle
Medal record
Men's freestyle wrestling
Representing Canada
Commonwealth Games
Bronze medal – third place	2018 Gold Coast	97 kg
Pan American Championships
Bronze medal – third place	2017 Lauro de Freitas	86 kg
Bronze medal – third place	2018 Lima	97 kg

Jordan David Steen (born 26 June 1991) is a Canadian freestyle wrestler. In March 2020, he qualified to represent Canada at the 2020 Summer Olympics at the 2020 Pan American Wrestling Olympic Qualification Tournament held in Ottawa, Canada.

== Career ==
Steen represented Canada at the 2013 Summer Universiade in Kazan, Russia without winning a medal.

In 2017, Steen won one of the bronze medals in the 86 kg event at the Pan American Wrestling Championships held in Salvador, Brazil.

In 2018, Steen won one of the bronze medals in the 97 kg event at the Commonwealth Games held in Gold Coast, Australia. Later that year, he also won one of the bronze medals in the 97 kg event at the 2018 Pan American Wrestling Championships held in Lima, Peru.

He competed in the men's freestyle 97 kg event at the 2019 Pan American Games, also held in Lima, Peru, without winning a medal. He lost his first match against José Daniel Díaz of Venezuela and also lost his bronze medal match against Luis Miguel Pérez of the Dominican Republic.

Steen competed in the men's freestyle 97 kg event at the 2020 Summer Olympics held in Tokyo, Japan.

== Achievements ==
Year	Tournament	Location	Result	Event
2017	Pan American Wrestling Championships	Lauro de Freitas, Brazil	3rd	Freestyle 86 kg
2018	Commonwealth Games	Gold Coast, Australia	3rd	Freestyle 97 kg
2018	Pan American Wrestling Championships	Lima, Peru	3rd	Freestyle 97 kg
