= Mohammed Fardj =

Algerian freestyle wrestler

Personal information
- Born: 19 July 1998 (age 28)

Sport
- Country: Algeria
- Sport: Amateur wrestling
- Event: Freestyle
Medal record
Men's freestyle wrestling
Representing Algeria
African Games
Bronze medal – third place	2019 Rabat	97 kg
African Championships
Gold medal – first place	2020 Algiers	92 kg
Gold medal – first place	2022 El Jadida	92 kg
Bronze medal – third place	2019 Hammamet	92 kg

Mohammed Fardj (born 19 July 1998) is an Algerian freestyle wrestler. He is a bronze medalist at the African Games and a three-time medalist, including two gold medals, at the African Wrestling Championships.

== Career ==
He represented Algeria in the men's freestyle 97 kg event at the 2018 Mediterranean Games held in Tarragona, Catalonia, Spain. In 2019, he represented Algeria at the African Games held in Rabat, Morocco and he won one of the bronze medals in the men's freestyle 97 kg event. In the same year, he also competed in the 92 kg event at the 2019 World Wrestling Championships held in Nur-Sultan, Kazakhstan without winning a medal.

He qualified at the 2021 African & Oceania Wrestling Olympic Qualification Tournament to represent Algeria at the 2020 Summer Olympics in Tokyo, Japan. He was registered to compete in the men's 97 kg event but he did not compete.

He won the gold medal in his event at the 2022 African Wrestling Championships held in El Jadida, Morocco. He competed in the men's 97 kg event at the 2022 Mediterranean Games held in Oran, Algeria.

== Achievements ==
Year	Tournament	Location	Result	Event
2019	African Wrestling Championships	Hammamet, Tunisia	3rd	Freestyle 92 kg
2019	African Games	Rabat, Morocco	3rd	Freestyle 97 kg
2020	African Wrestling Championships	Algiers, Algeria	1st	Freestyle 92 kg
2022	African Wrestling Championships	El Jadida, Morocco	1st	Freestyle 92 kg
