= Ekerekeme Agiomor =

Nigerian freestyle wrestler

Personal information
- Born: 16 December 1994 (age 31)

Sport
- Country: Nigeria
- Sport: Amateur wrestling
- Event: Freestyle
Medal record
Men's freestyle wrestling
Representing Nigeria
African Championships
Gold medal – first place	2018 Port Harcourt	79 kg
Bronze medal – third place	2019 Hammamet	79 kg
Bronze medal – third place	2020 Algiers	86 kg
Bronze medal – third place	2022 El Jadida	86 kg

Ekerekeme Agiomor (born 16 December 1994) is a Nigerian freestyle wrestler. He is a four-time medalist, including gold, at the African Wrestling Championships.

== Career ==
He won the gold medal in the 79 kg event at the 2018 African Wrestling Championships held in Port Harcourt, Nigeria. A year later, he won one of the bronze medals in this event at the 2019 African Wrestling Championships held in Hammamet, Tunisia.

In 2020, he won one of the bronze medals in the 86 kg event at the African Wrestling Championships held in Algiers, Algeria.

He qualified at the 2021 African & Oceania Wrestling Olympic Qualification Tournament to represent Nigeria at the 2020 Summer Olympics in Tokyo, Japan. He competed in the men's 86 kg event.

He won one of the bronze medals in his event at the 2022 African Wrestling Championships held in El Jadida, Morocco. He competed in the men's 86 kg event at the 2022 Commonwealth Games held in Birmingham, England.

== Achievements ==
Year	Tournament	Venue	Result	Event
2018	African Wrestling Championships	Port Harcourt, Nigeria	1st	Freestyle 79 kg
2019	African Wrestling Championships	Hammamet, Tunisia	3rd	Freestyle 79 kg
2020	African Wrestling Championships	Algiers, Algeria	3rd	Freestyle 86 kg
2022	African Wrestling Championships	El Jadida, Morocco	3rd	Freestyle 86 kg
