= Lamjed Maafi =

Tunisian Greco-Roman wrestler (born 2001)

Personal information
- Nationality: Tunisia
- Born: 19 March 2001 (age 25)

Sport
- Sport: Greco-Roman wrestling
Medal record
African Championships
| Gold medal – first place | 2022 El Jadida | 77 kg |
| Silver medal – second place | 2020 Algiers | 72 kg |

Lamjed Maafi (Arabic: أمجد المعافي, born 19 March 2001) is a Tunisian wrestler. He competed in the 2020 Summer Olympics after winning the African and Oceanian qualifier. He competed in the 77 kg event.
