= Amr Reda Hussen =

Egyptian freestyle wrestler (born 1997)

Personal information
- Full name: Amr Reda Ramadan Hussen
- Nationality: Egypt
- Born: 26 August 1997 (age 28) Cairo, Egypt
- Height: 175 cm (5 ft 9 in)

Sport
- Country: Egypt
- Sport: Amateur wrestling
- Weight class: 74 kg
- Event: Freestyle
Medal record
Men's freestyle wrestling
Representing Egypt
African Championships
Gold medal – first place	2022 El Jadida	74 kg
Gold medal – first place	2023 Hammamet	74 kg
Silver medal – second place	2018 Port Harcourt	70 kg
Bronze medal – third place	2020 Algiers	74 kg
African Games
Gold medal – first place	2023 Accra	74 kg
Bronze medal – third place	2019 Rabat	65 kg
Mediterranean Games
Gold medal – first place	2022 Oran	74 kg
Grand Prix
Bronze medal – third place	2022 Almaty	74 kg
Bronze medal – third place	2023 Budapest	70 kg

Amr Reda Ramadan Hussen (Arabic: عمرو رضا حسين born 26 August 1997) is an Egyptian freestyle wrestler. He is a gold medalist at the 2023 African Games and a four-time medalist, including two gold medals, at the African Wrestling Championships. He also won the gold medal in his event at the 2022 Mediterranean Games.

== Career ==
He won the silver medal in the men's 70 kg event at the 2018 African Wrestling Championships held in Port Harcourt, Nigeria. In 2019, he represented Egypt at the African Games held in Rabat, Morocco, and he won one of the bronze medals in the 65 kg event.

He qualified at the 2021 African & Oceania Wrestling Olympic Qualification Tournament to represent Egypt at the 2020 Summer Olympics in Tokyo, Japan. He competed in the men's 74 kg event.

He won the gold medal in his event at the 2022 African Wrestling Championships held in El Jadida, Morocco. He also won the gold medal in the 74 kg event at the 2022 Mediterranean Games held in Oran, Algeria.

He competed in the men's freestyle 74 kg event at the 2024 Summer Olympics in Paris, France.

He lost to David Carr at RAF 02 on October 25, 2025, in a match that crowned the inaugural RAF Welterweight Champion.

== Achievements ==
Year	Tournament	Location	Result	Event
2018	African Wrestling Championships	Port Harcourt, Nigeria	2nd	Freestyle 70 kg
2019	African Games	Rabat, Morocco	3rd	Freestyle 65 kg
2020	African Wrestling Championships	Algiers, Algeria	3rd	Freestyle 74 kg
2022	African Championships	El Jadida, Morocco	1st	Freestyle 74 kg
2022	Mediterranean Games	Oran, Algeria	1st	Freestyle 74 kg
2023	African Wrestling Championships	Hammamet, Tunisia	1st	Freestyle 74 kg
2024	African Games	Accra, Ghana	1st	Freestyle 74 kg
