= Adama Diatta =

Senegalese freestyle wrestler

Personal information
- Born: 14 August 1988 (age 38)
Medal record
Men's freestyle wrestling
Representing Senegal
African Championships
Gold medal – first place	2018 Port Harcourt	61 kg
Gold medal – first place	2017 Marrakesh	61 kg
Gold medal – first place	2016 Alexandria	57 kg
Gold medal – first place	2015 Alexandria	57 kg
Gold medal – first place	2012 Marrakesh	55 kg
Bronze medal – third place	2011 Dakar	60 kg
Silver medal – second place	2010 Cairo	55 kg
Gold medal – first place	2009 Casablanca	55 kg
Gold medal – first place	2008 Tunis	55 kg
Gold medal – first place	2007 Cairo	55 kg
African Games
Gold medal – first place	2015 Brazzaville	57kg
Gold medal – first place	2007 Algiers	55kg

Adama Diatta (born 14 August 1988) is a Senegalese freestyle wrestler. He participated in the Men's freestyle 55 kg at the 2008 Summer Olympics. In the round of 16, he lost to Tomohiro Matsunaga from Japan. In the repechage round, he was beaten by Turkish Sezar Akgul.

He competed for Senegal at the 2016 Summer Olympics in the 57 kg division. He was defeated by Yowlys Bonne of Cuba in the first round. He was the flag bearer for Senegal during the closing ceremony.

Through the 2021 African & Oceania Wrestling Olympic Qualification Tournament, he earned qualification to represent Senegal at the 2020 Summer Olympics in Tokyo, Japan.
