= Djahid Berrahal =

Algerian freestyle wrestler

Personal information
- Nationality: Algerian
- Born: 24 January 1994 (age 32)

Sport
- Country: Algeria
- Sport: Wrestling

Djahid Berrahal (born 24 January 1994) is an Algerian freestyle wrestler. He competed at the 2020 Summer Olympics in the men's 125 kg class.
