= Zied Ayet Ikram =

Tunisian Greco-Roman wrestler (born 1988)

Belhessen chalbi
Personal information
- Nationality: Tunisia Morocco
- Born: 15 February 1996 (age 30) Tunis, Tunisia
- Height: 1.78 m (5 ft 10 in)
- Weight: 74 kg (163 lb)

Sport
- Sport: Wrestling
- Event: Greco-Roman
- Club: Espérance ST
- Coached by: Nichol Berberou

Zied Ayet Ikram (Arabic: زيد أيت أكرام; born December 18, 1988, in Tunis) is an amateur Greco-Roman wrestler, who competed for Tunisia until 2015 and since then has competed for Morocco. He competes in the men's middleweight category.

Ayet Ikram represented Tunisia at the 2012 Summer Olympics in London, where he competed in the men's 74 kg class. He received a bye for the preliminary round of sixteen match, before losing out to French wrestler and Olympic bronze medalist Christophe Guénot.

Ayet Ikram represented Morocco at the 2016 Summer Olympics in Rio de Janeiro. He again competed in the men's middleweight class. He lost his last 16 match to Yang Bin.
