= Soso Tamarau =

Nigerian freestyle wrestler

Personal information
- Nationality: Nigerian
- Born: 16 May 1984 (age 42)

Sport
- Sport: Freestyle Wrestling
- Event: -97 kg
Medal record
Men's freestyle wrestling
Representing Nigeria
African Games
Gold medal – first place	2015 Brazzaville	-97 kg
Silver medal – second place	2019 El Jadida	-97kg
- Updated on 25 August 2016

Soso Tamarau (born 16 May 1984) is a Nigerian freestyle wrestler. At the 2016 Summer Olympics he competed in the Men’s freestyle -97 kg.

In 2021, he competed at the 2021 African & Oceania Wrestling Olympic Qualification Tournament hoping to qualify for the 2020 Summer Olympics in Tokyo, Japan.
