= 2024 African Wrestling Championships =

2024 African Championships
- Host city: Alexandria, Egypt
- Dates: 14-19 March
- Stadium: Borg Al Arab Sports Hall

Champions
- Freestyle: Egypt
- Greco-Roman: Egypt
- Women: Nigeria

The 2024 Seniors, U20, U17 African Wrestling Championships is the 39th edition of African Wrestling Championships of combined events, and took place from 14 to 19 March in Alexandria, Egypt.

== Medal table ==
* Host nation (Egypt)

Rank	Nation	Gold	Silver	Bronze	Total
1	Egypt*	14	7	7	28
2	Nigeria	7	3	3	13
3	Algeria	3	12	4	19
4	Tunisia	3	3	7	13
5	Guinea-Bissau	2	0	0	2
6	Senegal	1	1	1	3
7	Cameroon	0	3	2	5
8	Angola	0	1	3	4
9	South Africa	0	0	4	4
10	Cape Verde	0	0	2	2
10	Ivory Coast	0	0	2	2
10	Morocco	0	0	2	2
10	Namibia	0	0	2	2
14	Comoros	0	0	1	1
14	Sierra Leone	0	0	1	1
Totals (15 entries)		30	30	41	101

== Team ranking ==
Rank	Men's freestyle		Men's Greco-Roman		Women's freestyle	
Rank	Team	Points	Team	Points	Team	Points
1	Egypt	205	Egypt	240	Nigeria	245
2	Algeria	170	Algeria	184	Egypt	162
3	Senegal	96	Tunisia	95	Tunisia	140
4	Cameroon	80	Morocco	76	Cameroon	100
5	Tunisia	74	Angola	69	Algeria	79
6	Nigeria	62	South Africa	53	South Africa	49
7	Guinea	59	Namibia	27	Ivory Coast	30
8	South Africa	49	Sierra Leone	25	Madagascar	24
9	Cape Verde	48	Comoros	15	Kenya	16
10	Morocco	47	Cape Verde	12	Morocco	16

== Medal summary ==
=== Men's freestyle ===
Event	Gold	Silver	Bronze
57 kg	Diamantino Iuna Fafé; Guinea-Bissau	Roland Nforsong; Cameroon	Abdelrahman Mahmoud; Egypt
57 kg	Diamantino Iuna Fafé; Guinea-Bissau	Roland Nforsong; Cameroon	Khalil Barkouti; Tunisia
61 kg	Abdelhak Kherbache; Algeria	Didier Diatta; Senegal	Hassan Mohamed Elsayed; Egypt
65 kg	Shehabeldin Mohamed; Egypt	Zohier Iftene; Algeria	Stephen Izolo; Nigeria
65 kg	Shehabeldin Mohamed; Egypt	Zohier Iftene; Algeria	Manaceu Ngonda; Angola
70 kg	Abderrahmane Benaissa; Algeria	Ahmed Sadek Mohamed; Egypt	Brendin Louw; South Africa
74 kg	Bacar N'Dum; Guinea-Bissau	Saad Bouguerra; Algeria	Mohamed Tarek Abdelhady; Egypt
74 kg	Bacar N'Dum; Guinea-Bissau	Saad Bouguerra; Algeria	João Barbosa Vicente; Cape Verde
79 kg	Chems Fetairia; Algeria	Nasser Sayed Fares; Egypt	Mohamed Ben Jaafar; Tunisia
86 kg	Mohamed Ahmed Abdelaal; Egypt	Oussama Abdellaoui; Algeria	Harrison Onovwiomogbohwo; Nigeria
86 kg	Mohamed Ahmed Abdelaal; Egypt	Oussama Abdellaoui; Algeria	Matteo Monteiro; Cape Verde
92 kg	Mohamed Mostafa Salaheldin; Egypt	Issa Rhimi; Tunisia	Yacine Lakrout; Algeria
97 kg	Pape N’Diaye; Senegal	Abdelrahman Abouheiba; Egypt	Franck Lionel Anaba; Cameroon
125 kg	Youssif Hemida; Egypt	Ashton Mutuwa; Nigeria	Modou Faye; Senegal
125 kg	Youssif Hemida; Egypt	Ashton Mutuwa; Nigeria	Justin Van Zyl; South Africa

=== Men's Greco-Roman ===
Event	Gold	Silver	Bronze
55 kg	Shaaban Abdellatif; Egypt	Sefiane Guezzania; Algeria	Bofenda Kaluweko; Angola
60 kg	Haithem Mahmoud; Egypt	Mohamed Dridi; Algeria	Latuf Madi; Comoros
63 kg	Adham Ayman El Sayed; Egypt	Abdennour Laouni; Algeria	Romio Goliath; Namibia
67 kg	Moustafa Alameldin; Egypt	Fayssal Benfredj; Algeria	Sahid Kargbo; Sierra Leone
72 kg	Radhwen Tarhouni; Tunisia	Abdelmalek Merabet; Algeria	Emad Ghaly; Egypt
77 kg	Mohamed Zahab Khalil; Egypt	Chawki Doulache; Algeria	Francisco Kadima; Angola
82 kg	Mahmoud Walid Ibrahim; Egypt	Amar Moumene; Algeria	Belhasan Azaouzi; Tunisia
87 kg	Noureldin Hassan; Egypt	Roberto Nsangua; Angola	Hakim at-Tarabulusi; Tunisia
97 kg	Emad Abouelatta; Egypt	Mohamed Missaoui; Tunisia	Wissam Kouainso; Morocco
130 kg	Abdellatif Mohamed; Egypt	Hichem Kouchit; Algeria	Ahmed Serehali; Morocco

=== Women's freestyle ===
Event	Gold	Silver	Bronze
50 kg	Mercy Genesis; Nigeria	Rosine Ntsa Assouga; Cameroon	Ibtissem Doudou; Algeria
50 kg	Mercy Genesis; Nigeria	Rosine Ntsa Assouga; Cameroon	Nourhene Hedhli; Tunisia
53 kg	Christianah Ogunsanya; Nigeria	Chahrazed Ayachi; Tunisia	Nogona Bakayoko; Ivory Coast
53 kg	Christianah Ogunsanya; Nigeria	Chahrazed Ayachi; Tunisia	Hadir Ahmed; Egypt
55 kg	Adijat Idris; Nigeria	Aya Soliman; Egypt	Lobna Ichaoui; Tunisia
57 kg	Odunayo Adekuoroye; Nigeria	Chaima Aouisse; Algeria	Shaimaa Abdelzaher; Egypt
57 kg	Odunayo Adekuoroye; Nigeria	Chaima Aouisse; Algeria	Faten Hammami; Tunisia
59 kg	Mercy Adekuoroye; Nigeria	Hana Hussein; Egypt	Chahd Jeljeli; Tunisia
62 kg	Esther Kolawole; Nigeria	Farah Ali Hussein; Egypt	Mastoura Soudani; Algeria
62 kg	Esther Kolawole; Nigeria	Farah Ali Hussein; Egypt	Minette Kruger; South Africa
65 kg	Ebipatei Mughenbofa; Nigeria	Mouda Hamdoun; Egypt	Ikome Namondo; Cameroon
68 kg	Blessing Oborududu; Nigeria	Menatalla Badran; Egypt	Nour Jeljeli; Tunisia
72 kg	Ebi Biogos; Nigeria	Aya Ichaoui; Tunisia	Aimelda Ndiffo; Cameroon
76 kg	Zaineb Sghaier; Tunisia	Hannah Rueben; Nigeria	Amy Youin; Ivory Coast

== Participating nations ==
196 competitors from 24 nations participated:

1. Algeria (25)
2. Angola (10)
3. Burundi (2)
4. Benin (3)
5. Ivory Coast (2)
6. Cameroon (15)
7. Comoros (1)
8. Cape Verde (7)
9. Egypt (30) (Host)
10. Gambia (2)
11. Guinea-Bissau (3)
12. Guinea (2)
13. Kenya (5)
14. Madagascar (4)
15. Morocco (15)
16. Mauritius (1)
17. Namibia (4)
18. Nigeria (15)
19. South Africa (15)
20. Senegal (8)
21. Sierra Leone (2)
22. Sudan (1)
23. Tunisia (21)
24. Uganda (3)
