= Oussama Assad =

Moroccan wrestler (born 1999)

Oussama Assaad
Personal information
- Nationality: Moroccan
- Born: 2 February 1999 (age 27) Kénitra

Sport
- Sport: Wrestling
- Events: Freestyle, Greco-Roman
Medal record
Men's freestyle wrestling
Representing Morocco
African Championships
Gold medal – first place	2025 Casablanca	125 kg
Men's Greco-Roman wrestling
African Championships
Bronze medal – third place	2022 El Jadida	97 kg

Oussama Assaad (born 2 February 1999) is a Moroccan wrestler who competes in both freestyle and Greco-Roman styles. He represented Morocco at the 2024 Summer Olympics in Paris, finishing 15th in the men's Greco-Roman 130 kg category.

== Career ==
Assaad won the gold medal in the 125 kg freestyle category at the 2025 African Wrestling Championships. He previously claimed the bronze medal in the 97 kg Greco-Roman event at the 2022 African Wrestling Championships.

At the 2024 Summer Olympics in Paris, Assaad competed in the men's Greco-Roman 130 kg event and finished 15th.
