= 2023 African Wrestling Championships =

- Host city: Hammamet, Tunisia
- Dates: 15-21 May 2023
- Stadium: Hammamet Indoor Sports Hall

Champions
- Freestyle: Egypt
- Greco-Roman: Algeria
- Women: Nigeria

The 2023 Seniors, Juniors, Cadets African Wrestling Championships was the 38th edition of African Wrestling Championships of combined events, and took place from 15 to 21 May in Hammamet, Tunisia.

== Medal table (Seniors) ==
* Host nation (Tunisia)

Rank	Nation	Gold	Silver	Bronze	Total
1	Egypt	11	8	4	23
2	Algeria	7	6	5	18
3	Nigeria	6	4	2	12
4	Tunisia*	5	7	11	23
5	Guinea-Bissau	1	1	0	2
6	Morocco	0	1	4	5
6	South Africa	0	1	4	5
8	Ivory Coast	0	1	0	1
8	Sierra Leone	0	1	0	1
10	Kenya	0	0	2	2
10	Namibia	0	0	2	2
10	Senegal	0	0	2	2
13	Angola	0	0	1	1
13	Cameroon	0	0	1	1
13	Guinea	0	0	1	1
Totals (15 entries)		30	30	39	99

== Team ranking ==
Rank	Men's freestyle		Men's Greco-Roman		Women's freestyle	
Rank	Team	Points	Team	Points	Team	Points
1	Egypt	215	Algeria	210	Nigeria	230
2	Tunisia	173	Egypt	200	Tunisia	179
3	Algeria	129	Tunisia	149	Egypt	110
4	Morocco	103	Morocco	127	Algeria	94
5	South Africa	92	Angola	51	Kenya	58
6	Nigeria	70	South Africa	41	Morocco	40
7	Kenya	52	Namibia	30	Ivory Coast	30
8	Guinea-Bissau	51	Kenya	23	Cameroon	22
9	Cameroon	42	Sierra Leone	20	Guinea	15
10	Angola	35	Nigeria	10	Senegal	15

== Seniors ==
=== Men's freestyle ===
Event	Gold	Silver	Bronze
57 kg	Diamantino Iuna Fafé; Guinea-Bissau	Gamal Mohamed; Egypt	Roland Nforsong; Cameroon
57 kg	Diamantino Iuna Fafé; Guinea-Bissau	Gamal Mohamed; Egypt	Khalil Barkouti; Tunisia
61 kg	Abdelhak Kherbache; Algeria	Firas Khalifa; Tunisia	Shehabeldin Mohamed; Egypt
61 kg	Abdelhak Kherbache; Algeria	Firas Khalifa; Tunisia	Yassine Jaa; Morocco
65 kg	Farouk Jelassi; Tunisia	Frederik Nortje; South Africa	Zohier Iftene; Algeria
65 kg	Farouk Jelassi; Tunisia	Frederik Nortje; South Africa	Omar Mourad; Egypt
70 kg	Said El Gahsh; Egypt	Mohamed Ali Zorgui; Tunisia	Pieter Roedulf; South Africa
70 kg	Said El Gahsh; Egypt	Mohamed Ali Zorgui; Tunisia	Sylvio Diatta; Senegal
74 kg	Amr Reda Hussen; Egypt	Bacar Ndum; Guinea-Bissau	Yassine Faraj; Morocco
74 kg	Amr Reda Hussen; Egypt	Bacar Ndum; Guinea-Bissau	Abdelkader Ikkal; Algeria
79 kg	Ahmed Khaled Mohamed; Egypt	Chemseddine Fetairia; Algeria	Francisco Kadima; Angola
79 kg	Ahmed Khaled Mohamed; Egypt	Chemseddine Fetairia; Algeria	Ebikeme Newlife; Nigeria
86 kg	Fateh Benferdjallah; Algeria	Saifeldin Elkoumy; Egypt	Harrison Onovwiomogbohwo; Nigeria
86 kg	Fateh Benferdjallah; Algeria	Saifeldin Elkoumy; Egypt	Edward Louwis Lessing; South Africa
92 kg	Imed Kaddidi; Tunisia	Mahmoud Walid Ibrahim; Egypt	Machiel Grobler; South Africa
97 kg	Mostafa Elders; Egypt	Mohamed Saadaoui; Tunisia	Nicolaas De Lange; South Africa
125 kg	Diaaeldin Kamal; Egypt	Hamza Rahmani; Tunisia	Anas Lamkabber; Morocco

=== Men's Greco-Roman ===
Event	Gold	Silver	Bronze
55 kg	Mohamed Yacine Dridi; Algeria	Adem Lamloum; Tunisia	Alexandro Haininga; Namibia
60 kg	Haithem Mahmoud; Egypt	Ibrahim Bunduka; Sierra Leone	Ismail Ettalibi; Morocco
60 kg	Haithem Mahmoud; Egypt	Ibrahim Bunduka; Sierra Leone	Romio Goliath; Namibia
63 kg	Abdeldjebar Djebbari; Algeria	Ahmad Baghduda; Egypt	Oussama Nasr; Tunisia
67 kg	Mohamed Ibrahim El-Sayed; Egypt	Ishak Ghaiou; Algeria	Aymen Ben Ali; Tunisia
72 kg	Abdelmalek Merabet; Algeria	Mohamed Yehia Abdelkader; Egypt	Radhwen Tarhouni; Tunisia
77 kg	Mohamed Zahab Khalil; Egypt	Akram Boudjemline; Algeria	Sami Slama; Tunisia
82 kg	Abdelkrim Ouakali; Algeria	Elias Chiguer; Morocco	Mahmoud Walid Ibrahim; Egypt
87 kg	Bachir Sid Azara; Algeria	Emad Abouelatta; Egypt	Mohamed Dhia Jabri; Tunisia
97 kg	Mohamed Ali Gabr; Egypt	Adem Boudjemline; Algeria	Skander Missaoui; Tunisia
130 kg	Abdellatif Mohamed; Egypt	Amine Guennichi; Tunisia	Hichem Kouchit; Algeria

=== Women's freestyle ===
Event	Gold	Silver	Bronze
50 kg	Mercy Genesis; Nigeria	Cheima Chebila; Algeria	Emma Wangila; Kenya
53 kg	Christianah Ogunsanya; Nigeria	Nogona Bakayoko; Ivory Coast	Ibtissem Doudou; Algeria
53 kg	Christianah Ogunsanya; Nigeria	Nogona Bakayoko; Ivory Coast	Abir Zarrouki; Tunisia
55 kg	Jumoke Adekoye; Nigeria	Achouak Tekouk; Algeria	Lobna Ichaoui; Tunisia
57 kg	Mercy Adekuoroye; Nigeria	Faten Hammami; Tunisia	Rayane Houfaf; Algeria
59 kg	Siwar Bousetta; Tunisia	Patience Opuene; Nigeria	Farah Ali Hussein; Egypt
62 kg	Marwa Amri; Tunisia	Esther Kolawole; Nigeria	Fatoumata Camara; Guinea
65 kg	Khadija Jlassi; Tunisia	Ebipatei Mughenbofa; Nigeria	Eunice Mburu; Kenya
68 kg	Blessing Oborududu; Nigeria	Samah Abdellatif; Egypt	Nour Jeljeli; Tunisia
72 kg	Ebi Biogos; Nigeria	Menatalla Badran; Egypt	Zaineb Sghaier; Tunisia
76 kg	Samar Amer; Egypt	Hannah Reuben; Nigeria	Anta Sambou; Senegal

== Participating nations ==
204 competitors from 21 nations participated:

1. Algeria (25)
2. Angola (13)
3. Ivory Coast (3)
4. Cameroon (6)
5. Comoros (2)
6. Cape Verde (3)
7. Egypt (26)
8. Guinea-Bissau (3)
9. Guinea (1)
10. Kenya (17)
11. Madagascar (5)
12. Morocco (24)
13. Mauritius (2)
14. Namibia (2)
15. Nigeria (17)
16. South Africa (14)
17. Senegal (3)
18. Sierra Leone (3)
19. Sudan (1)
20. Tunisia (30) (Host)
21. Uganda (4)

== Juniors (U-20) ==
=== Medal table (U-20) ===
* Host nation (Tunisia)

Rank	Nation	Gold	Silver	Bronze	Total
1	Egypt	17	4	3	24
2	Tunisia*	7	10	7	24
3	Algeria	3	9	11	23
4	Nigeria	2	0	0	2
5	Cape Verde	1	1	0	2
6	Angola	0	3	2	5
7	Morocco	0	2	1	3
8	Namibia	0	1	1	2
9	South Africa	0	0	3	3
10	Ivory Coast	0	0	1	1
Totals (10 entries)		30	30	29	89

=== Men's freestyle ===
Event	Gold	Silver	Bronze
57 kg	Khalil Barkouti; Tunisia	Ben Hachem Tarik; Morocco	Islam Zerrougui; Algeria
61 kg	Shehabeldin Mohamed; Egypt	Abderrahmane Benhamadi; Algeria	Mohamed Manai; Tunisia
65 kg	Omar Mohamed Mourad; Egypt	Manaceu Ngonda; Angola	Kossai Ajimi; Tunisia
70 kg	Abderrahmane Benaissa; Algeria	Mohamed Ali Zorgui; Tunisia	Said Elgahsh; Egypt
74 kg	Mohamed Abdelhady; Egypt	Rayanne Essaidi; Morocco	Mohamed Bendjah; Algeria
79 kg	Matteo Tresse; Cape Verde	Karim Eldobay; Egypt	Youcef Douh; Algeria
86 kg	Harrison Onovwiomogbohwo; Nigeria	Roberto Nsangua; Angola	Yacine Lakrout; Algeria
92 kg	Mohamed Aziz Beji; Tunisia	Hamza Kacedi; Algeria	Jones Mabungu; Angola
97 kg	Mohamed Salaheldin; Egypt	Radwane Radwane; Tunisia	Kegan Coetzee; South Africa
125 kg	Fekry Eissa; Egypt	Brahim Melki; Tunisia	Nassim Boudechicha; Algeria

=== Men's Greco-Roman ===
Event	Gold	Silver	Bronze
55 kg	Ahmed Abdelbary Shaban; Egypt	Mohamed Kalila; Algeria	Virinao Nguatjiti; Namibia
60 kg	Mohamed Hkiri; Tunisia	Mouadh Tazekrit; Algeria	Mohamed Ayman Ibrahim; Egypt
63 kg	Adham Ayman Elsayed; Egypt	Oussama Nasr; Tunisia	Ali Sabri Kharouba; Algeria
67 kg	Moustafa Alameldin; Egypt	Fayssal Benfredj; Algeria	Koussay Melki; Tunisia
72 kg	Yehia Abdelkader; Egypt	Belhasan Azaouzi; Tunisia	Mohamed Zemmedj; Algeria
77 kg	Mahmoud Adel Ahmed; Egypt	Haithem Issaad; Algeria	Mohamed Malhi; Tunisia
82 kg	Mahmoud Walid Ibrahim; Egypt	Dhiyaeddine Remmache; Algeria	Omar Rezgui; Tunisia
87 kg	Kareem Eldesouky; Egypt	Roberto Nsangua; Angola	Abderrahmen Bouguerra; Algeria
97 kg	Mehdi Ben Mohamed; Tunisia	Fares Issaad; Algeria	Mohamed Abdelnaby Ahmed; Egypt
130 kg	Fekry Eissa; Egypt	Mohamed Hassen Nasr; Tunisia	Adem Lenchi; Algeria

=== Women's freestyle ===
Event	Gold	Silver	Bronze
50 kg	Abir Zarrouki; Tunisia	Malak Osama Moustafa; Egypt	Asma Belaid; Algeria
53 kg	Fatima Bouchibi; Algeria	Chaima Nasri; Tunisia	Kyla Meyer; South Africa
55 kg	Tarilayefa Bekefula; Nigeria	Achouak Tekouk; Algeria	Nour Raouafi; Tunisia
57 kg	Louji Yassin; Egypt	Saida Cheridi; Tunisia	Helena As; South Africa
59 kg	Farah Ali Hamada; Egypt	Kavelishimwe Abraham; Namibia	Nawel Bahloul; Algeria
62 kg	Mastoura Soudani; Algeria	Gharam Askar; Egypt	Chahd Jeljeli; Tunisia
65 kg	Khadija Jlassi; Tunisia	Mouda Badawi Hamdoun; Egypt	Sofia Vemba; Angola
68 kg	Menatalla Badran; Egypt	Aya Ichaoui; Tunisia	Nassma Essatouri; Morocco
72 kg	Heba Sapry Ibrahim; Egypt	Nesrine Chwerfi; Tunisia	Lou Akissi Irie; Ivory Coast
76 kg	Ranim Saidi; Tunisia	Ariana Xavier; Cape Verde	None awarded

== Cadets (U-17) ==
=== Medal table (U-17) ===
* Host nation (Tunisia)

Rank	Nation	Gold	Silver	Bronze	Total
1	Egypt	15	4	1	20
2	Tunisia*	5	7	13	25
3	Algeria	4	12	4	20
4	South Africa	4	4	5	13
5	Namibia	1	1	3	5
6	Angola	1	1	0	2
7	Burundi	0	1	0	1
8	Madagascar	0	0	1	1
Totals (8 entries)		30	30	27	87

=== Men's freestyle ===
Event	Gold	Silver	Bronze
45 kg	Mustapha Batnini; Tunisia	Carlos Giammello; South Africa	Calvin Dreyer; Namibia
48 kg	Dominick Aoun; South Africa	Haroun Bouthouri; Tunisia	Mohammed Adel Kheyar; Algeria
51 kg	Mokbel Sahli; Tunisia	Redouane Sissaoui; Algeria	Karim Elemary; Egypt
55 kg	Abdelghani Aid; Algeria	Rohan du Plessis; South Africa	Abdallah Jrad; Tunisia
60 kg	Ghayth Feleh; Tunisia	Kamal Amr Othman; Egypt	Petrus Walt; South Africa
65 kg	Fares Elsawy; Egypt	Miguel Vata António; Angola	Jaun Rosenblatt Hugo; South Africa
71 kg	Mohamed Chibikh; Algeria	Ismail Hamed Elsayed; Egypt	Mohamed Zwabi; Tunisia
80 kg	Juan Bisschoff; South Africa	Amenallah Kthiri; Tunisia	None awarded
92 kg	Wiandru Rooyen; South Africa	Hamza Kacedi; Algeria	Pieter Lafras Uys; Namibia
110 kg	Marwan Ehab Mohamed; Egypt	Anis Meziti; Algeria	Hendrik Louw; South Africa

=== Men's Greco-Roman ===
Event	Gold	Silver	Bronze
45 kg	Calvin Dreyer; Namibia	Helmi Chihi; Tunisia	Carlos Giammello; South Africa
48 kg	Karim Elemary; Egypt	Dominick Aoun; South Africa	Sameh Jabri; Tunisia
51 kg	Omar Mohamed Ibrahim; Egypt	Adel Yakoub Fegas; Algeria	Phumlani Maphumulo; South Africa
55 kg	Ahmed Abdelbary Shaban; Egypt	Firas Bouthouri; Tunisia	Lazarus Haimbodi; Namibia
60 kg	Mohamed Ayman Ibrahim; Egypt	Petrus Walt; South Africa	Rayen Zayeni; Tunisia
65 kg	Mohamed Abdelrahim; Egypt	Ayoub Bentebiche; Algeria	Omar Malha; Tunisia
71 kg	Youssef Ahmed Badawy; Egypt	Zakaria Abes; Algeria	Abdelmajid Aouissaoui; Tunisia
80 kg	Seef Sameh Abdalaziz; Egypt	Abderrahmen Bouguerra; Algeria	Bilel Hafdhallah; Tunisia
92 kg	Abdelfattah Abdelzaher; Egypt	Pieter Lafras Uys; Namibia	Youcef Haddad; Algeria
110 kg	Mohamed Abdelnaby Ahmed; Egypt	Adem Lenchi; Algeria	Youssef Aloui; Tunisia

=== Women's freestyle ===
Event	Gold	Silver	Bronze
40 kg	Mareim Abdelaal; Egypt	Malak Sammoudi; Tunisia	None awarded
43 kg	Islem Nasr; Tunisia	Gharam Abdelaal; Egypt	Anouar Khelif; Algeria
46 kg	Dounia Zitouni; Algeria	Hadil Abdelli; Tunisia	None awarded
49 kg	Chloe Brewis; South Africa	Malak Osama Moustafa; Egypt	Nourhene Hedhli; Tunisia
53 kg	Manar Said Elmasry; Egypt	Fatima Zahra Bouchikhi; Algeria	Malek Khelifi; Tunisia
57 kg	Sabah Eid Khamis; Egypt	Chahd Jeljeli; Algeria	Melissa Merzouk; Tunisia
61 kg	Chaima Dahi; Tunisia	Gloria Niyonkuru; Burundi	Ilissia Amara; Algeria
65 kg	Mouda Badawi Hamdoun; Egypt	Yelda Outis; Algeria	Eya Bouafia; Tunisia
69 kg	Joseth Sasa Mavungu; Angola	Yasmine Bouregba; Algeria	Hadil Kahouli; Tunisia
73 kg	Melissa Belaid; Algeria	Rouyem Jlassi; Tunisia	Sarah Randrianandrasana; Madagascar
