= Romio Goliath =

Namibian sport wrestler

Personal information
- Full name: Romio Ricardo Goliath
- Nationality: Namibian
- Born: 13 September 1999 (age 27)

Sport
- Sport: Wrestling
- Event: Greco-Roman
- Club: After School Centre Wrestling Club
Medal record
Men's Greco-Roman wrestling
Representing Namibia
African Championships
Silver medal – second place	2020 Algiers	55 kg
Bronze medal – third place	2019 Hammamet	55 kg
Bronze medal – third place	2024 Alexandria	63 kg
- Updated on 21 March 2024

Romio Ricardo Goliath (born 13 September 1999) is a Namibian Greco-Roman wrestler. He is multiple medalist at the African Championships in the 55 kg category. He competed at the 2019 African Games in the Greco-Roman 60 kg event.

== Achievements ==
Year	Tournament	Venue	Result	Event
2019	African Championships	Hammamet, Tunisia	3rd	Greco-Roman 55 kg
2019	African Games	Rabat-El Jadida, Morocco	6th	Greco-Roman 60 kg
2020	African Championships	Algiers, Algeria	2nd	Greco-Roman 55 kg
2022	African Championships	El Jadida, Morocco	4th	Greco-Roman 55 kg
2023	African Championships	Hammamet, Tunisia	3rd	Greco-Roman 60 kg
2024	African Championships	Alexandria, Egypt	3rd	Greco-Roman 63 kg
