= Steyn de Lange =

South African freestyle wrestler

Personal information
- Full name: Nicolaas Johannes Steyn De Lange
- National team: South Africa
- Born: 23 August 2001 (age 25)
- Weight: 97 kg (214 lb)

Sport
- Country: South Africa
- Sport: Sport wrestling
- Event: Freestyle
Medal record
Men's freestyle wrestling
Representing South Africa
U20 World Championships
Bronze medal – third place	2021 Ufa	92 kg
African Championships
Silver medal – second place	2022 El Jadida	97 kg
Bronze medal – third place	2023 Hammamet	97 kg
Commonwealth Games
Silver medal – second place	2022 Birmingham	97 kg

Nicolaas Johannes Steyn De Lange (born 23 August 2001) is a South African freestyle wrestler who currently competes at 97 kilograms. He is an African Championships and Commonwealth Games medalist.

== Career ==
De Lange was the 2019 and 2020 African Junior Champion. In August 2021, he won a bronze medal at the 2021 World Junior Championships in Ufa. In May 2022, in El Jadida, Morocco, he lost to Mostafa Elders of Egypt in the final of the African Championships. In early August 2022, in Birmingham, having lost in the final to Nishan Randhawa of Canada, De Lange won the silver medal at the 2022 Commonwealth Games. In May 2023, in Hammamet, Tunisia, he won a bronze medal at the African Championships. In September 2023, at the World Championships in Belgrade, he lost to Russian Abdulrashid Sadulaev in the round of 32 and finished in 29th place. In March 2024, at the Africa and Oceania qualifying tournament in Alexandria, he managed to win a spot at the 2024 Summer Olympics in Paris. He competed in the men's freestyle 97 kg event at the Olympics.
