= Skander Missaoui =

Tunisian Greco-Roman wrestler

Personal information
- Full name: Mohamed Skander Missaoui

Sport
- Country: Tunisia
- Sport: Amateur wrestling
- Event: Greco-Roman
Medal record
Men's Greco-Roman wrestling
Representing Tunisia
African Games
Silver medal – second place	2019 Rabat	87 kg
African Championships
Silver medal – second place	2014 Tunis	80 kg
Silver medal – second place	2016 Alexandria	85 kg
Silver medal – second place	2018 Port Harcourt	87 kg
Silver medal – second place	2022 El Jadida	87 kg
Silver medal – second place	2024 Alexandria	97 kg
Bronze medal – third place	2017 Marrakesh	85 kg
Bronze medal – third place	2019 Hammamet	87 kg
Bronze medal – third place	2020 Algiers	87 kg
Bronze medal – third place	2023 Hammamet	97 kg

Mohamed Skander Missaoui (Arabic: محمد إسكندر الميساوي) is a Tunisian Greco-Roman wrestler. He represented Tunisia at the 2019 African Games held in Rabat, Morocco and he won the silver medal in the 87 kg event. He is also an eight-time medalist at the African Wrestling Championships.

== Career ==
In 2021, he competed at the African & Oceania Olympic Qualification Tournament hoping to qualify for the 2020 Summer Olympics in Tokyo, Japan.

He won the silver medal in his event at the 2022 African Wrestling Championships held in El Jadida, Morocco. He competed in the 87 kg event at the 2022 Mediterranean Games held in Oran, Algeria where he was eliminated in his first match by eventual bronze medalist Noureldin Hassan of Egypt.

== Achievements ==
Year	Tournament	Location	Result	Event
2019	African Games	Rabat, Morocco	2nd	Greco-Roman 87 kg
2020	African Wrestling Championships	Algiers, Algeria	3rd	Greco-Roman 87 kg
2022	African Wrestling Championships	El Jadida, Morocco	2nd	Greco-Roman 87 kg
2023	African Wrestling Championships	Hammamet, Tunisia	3rd	Greco-Roman 97 kg
