= Diamantino Iuna Fafé =

Bissau-Guinean freestyle wrestler

Personal information
- Born: 10 June 2001 (age 25)

Sport
- Country: Guinea-Bissau
- Sport: Amateur wrestling
- Weight class: 57 kg
- Event: Freestyle
Medal record
Men's freestyle wrestling
Representing Guinea-Bissau
African Championships
Gold medal – first place	2023 Hammamet	57 kg
Gold medal – first place	2024 Alexandria	57 kg
Gold medal – first place	2025 Casablanca	57 kg
Silver medal – second place	2020 Algiers	57 kg
Bronze medal – third place	2022 El Jadida	57 kg

Diamantino Iuna Fafé (born 10 June 2001) is a Bissau-Guinean freestyle wrestler. He is a five-time medalist, including three gold medals, at the African Wrestling Championships. He competed in the men's 57 kg event at the 2020 Summer Olympics held in Tokyo, Japan.

== Career ==
In 2018, he won the gold medal in the 55 kg event at the African Youth Games. In 2019, he competed in the 57 kg event at the World Wrestling Championships held in Nur-Sultan, Kazakhstan where he was eliminated in his first match by Yuki Takahashi of Japan.

He qualified at the 2021 African & Oceania Wrestling Olympic Qualification Tournament to represent Guinea-Bissau at the 2020 Summer Olympics in Tokyo, Japan.

He won one of the bronze medals in his event at the 2022 African Wrestling Championships held in El Jadida, Morocco.

He competed in the men's freestyle 57 kg event at the 2024 Summer Olympics in Paris, France.

== Achievements ==
Year	Tournament	Venue	Result	Event
2020	African Championships	Algiers, Algeria	2nd	Freestyle 57 kg
2022	African Championships	El Jadida, Morocco	3rd	Freestyle 57 kg
2023	African Championships	Hammamet, Tunisia	1st	Freestyle 57 kg
2024	African Championships	Alexandria, Egypt	1st	Freestyle 57 kg

Olympic Games
Preceded by Taciana Cesar; Augusto Midana	Flag bearer for Guinea-Bissau; Paris 2024	Succeeded by Incumbent
