= 2026 World Wrestling Championships – Women's freestyle 55 kg =

Women's freestyle 55 kg at the 2026 World Championships
- Venue: Barys Arena
- Dates: 29–30 October 2026
- Competitors: 17 from 17 nations

Medalists
gold medal	Everest Leydecker	United States
silver medal	Nataliia Klivchutska	Ukraine
bronze medal	Ekaterina Verbina	Russia
bronze medal	Nagisa Harada	Japan

The women's freestyle 55 kilograms is a competition featured at the 2026 World Wrestling Championships, and was held in Astana, Kazakhstan on 29 and 30 October 2026.

This freestyle wrestling competition consists of a single-elimination tournament, with a repechage used to determine the winner of two bronze medals. The two finalists face off for gold and silver medals. Each wrestler who loses to one of the two finalists moves into the repechage, culminating in a pair of bronze medal matches, featuring the semifinal losers each facing the remaining repechage opponent from their half of the bracket.

== Results ==
Legend

- F — Won by fall

=== Final ===
Final
Nataliia Klivchutska (UKR)	1
Everest Leydecker (USA)	4

=== Top half ===
Round of 32
Adijat Idris (NGR)	0
Veronika Konsevich (MKD)	4^{F}

Round of 16
Ekaterina Verbina (RUS)	14
Li Jingning (CHN)	9
Veronika Konsevich (MKD)	0
Nataliia Klivchutska (UKR)	4^{F}
Tuba Demir (TUR)	11
Sandugash Djenbaeva (UZB)	2
Ahilya Shatrughn Shinde (IND)	8
Yaynelis Sanz (CUB)	1

Quarterfinals
Ekaterina Verbina (RUS)	2
Nataliia Klivchutska (UKR)	4
Tuba Demir (TUR)	9
Ahilya Shatrughn Shinde (IND)	6

Semifinals
Nataliia Klivchutska (UKR)	6^{F}
Tuba Demir (TUR)	0

=== Bottom half ===
Round of 32

Round of 16
Karla Godinez (CAN)	1
Everest Leydecker (USA)	2
Iulia Leorda (MDA)	2
Anastasia Blayvas (GER)	8
Laura Almaganbetova (KAZ)	0
Nagisa Harada (JPN)	10
Tsogt-Ochiryn Namuuntsetseg (MGL)	0
Oh Kyong-ryong (PRK)	10

Quarterfinals
Everest Leydecker (USA)	4^{F}
Anastasia Blayvas (GER)	1
Nagisa Harada (JPN)	3^{F}
Oh Kyong-ryong (PRK)	0

Semifinals
Everest Leydecker (USA)	6
Nagisa Harada (JPN)	1

=== Repechage ===
Repechage round 2
Veronika Konsevich (MKD)	0
Ekaterina Verbina (RUS)	6^{F}
Karla Godinez (CAN)	3
Anastasia Blayvas (GER)	4

Bronze medals
Ekaterina Verbina (RUS)	11
Tuba Demir (TUR)	0
Anastasia Blayvas (GER)	0
Nagisa Harada (JPN)	10^{F}

== Final standing ==
Rank	Athlete
1st place, gold medalist(s)	Everest Leydecker (USA)
2nd place, silver medalist(s)	Nataliia Klivchutska (UKR)
3rd place, bronze medalist(s)	Ekaterina Verbina (RUS)
3rd place, bronze medalist(s)	Nagisa Harada (JPN)
5	Tuba Demir (TUR)
5	Anastasia Blayvas (GER)
7	Veronika Konsevich (MKD)
8	Oh Kyong-ryong (PRK)
9	Ahilya Shatrughn Shinde (IND)
10	Karla Godinez (CAN)
11	Li Jingning (CHN)
12	Iulia Leorda (MDA)
13	Sandugash Djenbaeva (UZB)
14	Yaynelis Sanz (CUB)
15	Adijat Idris (NGR)
16	Laura Almaganbetova (KAZ)
17	Tsogt-Ochiryn Namuuntsetseg (MGL)
