= Haithem Mahmoud =

Egyptian Greco-Roman wrestler

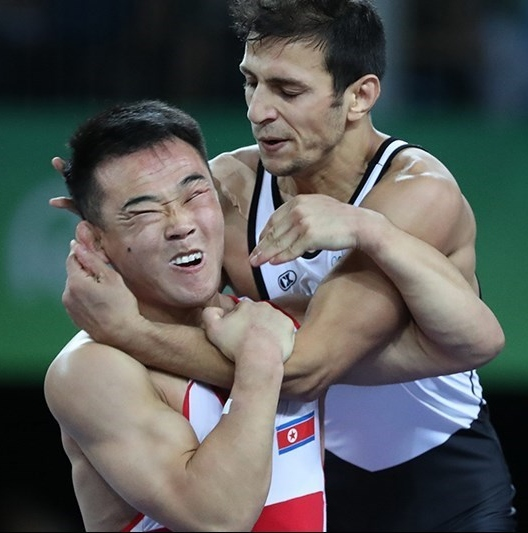
- Mahmoud (right) at the 2016 Olympics

Personal information
- Full name: Haithem Mahmoud Ahmed Mahmoud Fahmy
- Born: 23 September 1991 (age 34) Alexandria, Egypt
- Height: 154 cm (5 ft 1 in)
- Weight: 59 kg (130 lb)

Sport
- Sport: Greco-Roman wrestling
Medal record
Representing Egypt
Event	1st	2nd	3rd
African Games	1	1	1
African Championships	6	0	0
Mediterranean Games	2	0	1
Total	9	1	2
African Games
Gold medal – first place	2019 Rabat	60 kg
Silver medal – second place	2015 Brazzaville	65 kg
Bronze medal – third place	2015 Brazzaville	66 kg
African Championships
Gold medal – first place	2010 Cairo	55 kg
Gold medal – first place	2014 Tunis	59 kg
Gold medal – first place	2015 Alexandria	59 kg
Gold medal – first place	2019 Hammamet	63 kg
Gold medal – first place	2020 Algiers	60 kg
Gold medal – first place	2023 Hammamet	60 kg
Gold medal – first place	2024 Alexandria	60 kg
Mediterranean Games
Gold medal – first place	2013 Mersin	55 kg
Gold medal – first place	2018 Tarragona	60 kg
Bronze medal – third place	2022 Oran	60 kg

Haithem Mahmoud Ahmed Mahmoud Fahmy (Arabic: هيثم محمود أحمد محمود فهمي, born 23 September 1991 in Alexandria) is a Greco-Roman wrestler from Egypt who competes in the 59 kg category. At the 2016 Olympics he was eliminated in the first bout. He represented Egypt at the 2020 Summer Olympics in the 60kg category.
