= Anta Sambou =

Senegalese freestyle wrestler

Sport
- Country: Senegal
- Sport: Amateur wrestling
- Event: Freestyle
Medal record
Women's freestyle wrestling
Representing Senegal
African Games
Silver medal – second place	2019 Rabat	68 kg
Bronze medal – third place	2015 Brazzaville	63 kg
African Championships
Gold medal – first place	2022 El Jadida	72 kg
Silver medal – second place	2013 N'Djamena	67 kg
Silver medal – second place	2014 Tunis	60 kg
Silver medal – second place	2018 Port Harcourt	68 kg
Silver medal – second place	2019 Hammamet	68 kg
Silver medal – second place	2020 Algiers	68 kg
Bronze medal – third place	2011 Dakar	67 kg
Bronze medal – third place	2015 Alexandria	63 kg
Bronze medal – third place	2017 Marrakesh	69 kg
Bronze medal – third place	2023 Hammamet	76 kg

Anta Sambou is a Senegalese freestyle wrestler. She is a two-time medalist at the African Games. She won the gold medal in her event at the 2022 African Wrestling Championships held in El Jadida, Morocco.

== Career ==
She represented Senegal at the 2019 African Games and she won the silver medal in the women's freestyle 68 kg event. In 2020, she won the silver medal in the women's freestyle 68 kg event at the African Wrestling Championships held in Algiers, Algeria.

She competed at the 2021 African & Oceania Wrestling Olympic Qualification Tournament hoping to qualify for the 2020 Summer Olympics in Tokyo, Japan.

She competed in the 72 kg event at the 2021 Islamic Solidarity Games held in Konya, Turkey.

== Achievements ==
Year	Tournament	Location	Result	Event
2011	African Wrestling Championships	Dakar, Senegal	3rd	Freestyle 67 kg
2013	African Wrestling Championships	N'Djamena, Chad	2nd	Freestyle 67 kg
2014	African Wrestling Championships	Tunis, Tunisia	2nd	Freestyle 60 kg
2015	African Wrestling Championships	Alexandria, Egypt	3rd	Freestyle 63 kg
2015	African Games	Brazzaville, Republic of the Congo	3rd	Freestyle 63 kg
2017	African Wrestling Championships	Marrakesh, Morocco	3rd	Freestyle 69 kg
2018	African Wrestling Championships	Port Harcourt, Nigeria	2nd	Freestyle 68 kg
2019	African Wrestling Championships	Hammamet, Tunisia	2nd	Freestyle 68 kg
2019	African Games	Rabat, Morocco	2nd	Freestyle 68 kg
2020	African Wrestling Championships	Algiers, Algeria	2nd	Freestyle 68 kg
2022	African Wrestling Championships	El Jadida, Morocco	1st	Freestyle 72 kg
2023	African Wrestling Championships	Hammamet, Tunisia	3rd	Freestyle 76 kg
