= Adem Boudjemline =

Algerian Greco-Roman wrestler

Personal information
- Nationality: Algerian
- Born: 28 February 1994 (age 32) Sétif, Algeria

Sport
- Sport: Wrestling
- Event: Greco-Roman
Medal record
Men's Greco-Roman wrestling
Representing Algeria
African Games
Gold medal – first place	2015 Brazzaville	85 kg
Gold medal – first place	2019 Rabat	97 kg
African Championships
Gold medal – first place	2016 Alexandria	85 kg
Gold medal – first place	2017 Marrakesh	85 kg
Gold medal – first place	2018 Port Harcourt	87 kg
Gold medal – first place	2019 Hammamet	97 kg
Gold medal – first place	2020 Algiers	97 kg
Gold medal – first place	2022 El Jadida	97 kg
Silver medal – second place	2015 Alexandria	85 kg
Silver medal – second place	2023 Hammamet	97 kg
Bronze medal – third place	2014 Tunis	80 kg
Mediterranean Games
Silver medal – second place	2018 Tarragona	97 kg
Islamic Solidarity Games
Bronze medal – third place	2017 Baku	85 kg
- Updated on 24 August 2016

Adem Boudjemline (born 28 February 1994 in Sétif) is an Algerian Greco-Roman wrestler. At the 2016 Summer Olympics he competed in the Men's Greco-Roman -85 kg where he finished in 17th place after losing to Nikolay Bayryakov of Bulgaria in the 1/8 finals round.

He represented Algeria at the 2020 Summer Olympics held in Tokyo, Japan. He competed in the 97 kg event.

He won the gold medal in his event at the 2022 African Wrestling Championships held in El Jadida, Morocco.
