= Fatoumata Camara (wrestler) =

Guinean freestyle wrestler

Personal information
- Full name: Fatoumata Yarie Camara
- Born: 15 February 1996 (age 30)

Sport
- Country: Guinea
- Sport: Amateur wrestling
- Event: Freestyle
Medal record
Women's freestyle wrestling
Representing Guinea
African Games
Bronze medal – third place	2019 Rabat	62 kg
African Championships
Bronze medal – third place	2022 El Jadida	59 kg
Bronze medal – third place	2023 Hammamet	62 kg
Islamic Solidarity Games
Silver medal – second place	2021 Konya	62 kg

Fatoumata Yarie Camara (born 15 February 1996) is a Guinean freestyle wrestler. She represented Guinea at the 2019 African Games and she won the bronze medal in the women's freestyle 62 kg event. She won the silver medal in the 62 kg event at the 2021 Islamic Solidarity Games held in Konya, Turkey.

== Career ==
She competed in the women's 65 kg event at the 2019 World Wrestling Championships held in Nur-Sultan, Kazakhstan.

She qualified at the 2021 African & Oceania Wrestling Olympic Qualification Tournament to represent Guinea at the 2020 Summer Olympics in Tokyo, Japan. She competed in the women's 57 kg event.

She won the bronze medal in her event at the 2022 African Wrestling Championships held in El Jadida, Morocco.

She won the silver medal in the 62 kg event at the 2021 Islamic Solidarity Games held in Konya, Turkey.

== Achievements ==
Year	Tournament	Location	Result	Event
2019	African Games	Rabat, Morocco	3rd	Freestyle 62 kg
2022	African Wrestling Championships	El Jadida, Morocco	3rd	Freestyle 59 kg
2022	Islamic Solidarity Games	Konya, Turkey	2nd	Freestyle 62 kg
2023	African Wrestling Championships	Hammamet, Tunisia	3rd	Freestyle 62 kg
