= 2019 African Wrestling Championships =

2019 African Championship
- Host city: Hammamet, Tunisia
- Dates: 29–31 March
- Stadium: Salle Omnisports de Hammamet

Champions
- Freestyle: Tunisia
- Greco-Roman: Egypt
- Women: Nigeria

The 2019 African Wrestling Championships was held in Hammamet, Tunisia from 29 to 31 March 2019.

== Medal table ==
* Host nation (Tunisia)

Rank	Nation	Gold	Silver	Bronze	Total
1	Egypt (EGY)	12	7	5	24
2	Nigeria (NGR)	6	2	5	13
3	Tunisia (TUN)*	5	6	11	22
4	Algeria (ALG)	4	9	3	16
5	Morocco (MAR)	1	3	3	7
6	Senegal (SEN)	1	1	0	2
7	Guinea-Bissau (GBS)	1	0	2	3
8	Cameroon (CMR)	0	1	1	2
9	Burkina Faso (BUR)	0	1	0	1
10	DR Congo (COD)	0	0	2	2
11	Angola (ANG)	0	0	1	1
11	Chad (CHA)	0	0	1	1
11	Guinea (GUI)	0	0	1	1
11	Namibia (NAM)	0	0	1	1
Totals (14 entries)		30	30	36	96

=== Team ranking ===
Rank	Men's freestyle		Women's freestyle		Men's Greco-Roman	
Rank	Team	Points	Team	Points	Team	Points
1	Tunisia	183	Nigeria	195	Egypt	220
2	Egypt	180	Tunisia	177	Algeria	192
3	Algeria	117	Egypt	160	Tunisia	139
4	Morocco	90	Algeria	83	Morocco	119
5	Nigeria	63	Senegal	57	Democratic Republic of the Congo	51
6	Senegal	57	Cameroon	35	South Africa	22
7	Guinea-Bissau	55	Ivory Coast	22	Namibia	21
8	South Africa	55	Guinea	22	Angola	15
9	Democratic Republic of the Congo	48	Burkina Faso	20	Nigeria	15
10	Chad	33	Chad	12	Sierra Leone	10
11	Sudan	29			Ivory Coast	9
12	Angola	20				
13	Guinea	19				
14	Kenya	8				
15	Ivory Coast	6				

== Medal summary ==
=== Men's freestyle ===
Event	Gold	Silver	Bronze
57 kg	(Algeria) Abdelhak Kherbache	(Morocco) Chakir Ansari	(Egypt) Gamal Mohamed
61 kg	(Senegal) Adama Diatta	(Egypt) Yasser Ahmed	(Algeria) Mohamed Al-Amine Lakel
65 kg	(Guinea-Bissau) Mbunde Cumba	(Egypt) Aly Ibrahim Abdelhamid	(Chad) Elie Djekoundakom
65 kg	(Guinea-Bissau) Mbunde Cumba	(Egypt) Aly Ibrahim Abdelhamid	(Tunisia) Kaireddine Ben Telili
70 kg	(Egypt) Amr Reda Hussen	(Algeria) Fares Lakel	(Morocco) Rabii Regani
74 kg	(Nigeria) Ogbonna John	(Tunisia) Maher Ghanmi	(Egypt) Saifeldin El-Koumy
74 kg	(Nigeria) Ogbonna John	(Tunisia) Maher Ghanmi	(Guinea-Bissau) Augusto Midana
79 kg	(Tunisia) Ayoub Barraj	(Algeria) Fateh Benferdjallah	(Nigeria) Ekerekeme Agiomor
79 kg	(Tunisia) Ayoub Barraj	(Algeria) Fateh Benferdjallah	(Egypt) Aboubakr Gadelmawla
86 kg	(Tunisia) Sabri Mnasriya	(Morocco) Oussama Regani	(Guinea-Bissau) Bedopassa Buassat
86 kg	(Tunisia) Sabri Mnasriya	(Morocco) Oussama Regani	(Nigeria) Melvin Bibo
92 kg	(Tunisia) Mohamed Saadaoui	(Egypt) Hosam Mohamed Merghany	(Algeria) Mohammed Fardj
92 kg	(Tunisia) Mohamed Saadaoui	(Egypt) Hosam Mohamed Merghany	(Democratic Republic of the Congo) Aron Mbo
97 kg	(Egypt) Khaled El-Moatamadawi	(Tunisia) Meher Dahmani	(Guinea) Mohamed Saliou Camara
125 kg	(Egypt) Khaled Abdalla	(Tunisia) Abdelmoneim Adouli	(Democratic Republic of the Congo) Reagan Mabuba

=== Men's Greco-Roman ===
Event	Gold	Silver	Bronze
55 kg	(Algeria) Abdelkarim Fergat	(Egypt) Ahmed Bagdouda	(Namibia) Romio Goliath
60 kg	(Egypt) Moamen Mohamed	(Algeria) Abdennour Laouni	(Tunisia) Moez Jalel
63 kg	(Egypt) Haithem Mahmoud	(Algeria) Radhwen Tarhhoni	(Morocco) Fouad Fajari
67 kg	(Egypt) Mohamed Elsayed	(Tunisia) Souleymen Nasr	(Morocco) Bilal El-Bahja
72 kg	(Algeria) Tarek Benaissa	(Morocco) Aziz Boualem	(Nigeria) Emmanuel Nworie
77 kg	(Morocco) Zied Ait Ouagram	(Egypt) Mohamed Zahab Khalil	(Algeria) Akrem Boudjemline
82 kg	(Egypt) Ahmed Aly Ahmed	(Algeria) Abdelkrim Ouakali	(Tunisia) Hakim Trabelsi
87 kg	(Egypt) Mohamed Metwally	(Algeria) Bachir Sid Azara	(Tunisia) Mohamed Missaoui
97 kg	(Algeria) Adem Boudjemline	(Egypt) Mohamed Ali Gabr	(Tunisia) Amine Guennichi
97 kg	(Algeria) Adem Boudjemline	(Egypt) Mohamed Ali Gabr	(Angola) Francisco Ngonda
130 kg	(Egypt) Abdellatif Mohamed	(Algeria) Hichem Kouchit	(Tunisia) Mohamed Blaghji

=== Women's freestyle ===
Event	Gold	Silver	Bronze
50 kg	(Nigeria) Mercy Genesis	(Egypt) Nada Medani	(Algeria) Kheira Yahiaoui
53 kg	(Egypt) Hala Ahmed	(Tunisia) Sarra Hamdi	(Nigeria) Rosemary Nweke
55 kg	(Tunisia) Faten Hammami	(Algeria) Lamia Chemlal	(Egypt) Faten Ahmed
57 kg	(Nigeria) Odunayo Adekuoroye	(Cameroon) Joseph Essombe	(Tunisia) Dorssaf Gharssi
59 kg	(Egypt) Eman Guda Ebrahim	(Tunisia) Khouloud El Ouni	(Nigeria) Ifeoma Nwoye
62 kg	(Tunisia) Marwa Amri	(Nigeria) Aminat Adeniyi	(Cameroon) Berthe Etane Ngolle
65 kg	(Nigeria) Sunmisola Balogun	(Burkina Faso) Yvette Zié	(Tunisia) Nour Jeljeli
68 kg	(Nigeria) Blessing Oborududu	(Senegal) Anta Sambou	(Tunisia) Lilia Mejri
72 kg	(Egypt) Samar Amer	(Nigeria) Hannah Rueben	(Tunisia) Wiem Trabelsi
76 kg	(Nigeria) Blessing Onyebuchi	(Egypt) Mona Ahmed	(Tunisia) Rihem Ayari
