= Khadija Jlassi =

Tunisian freestyle wrestler (born 2003)

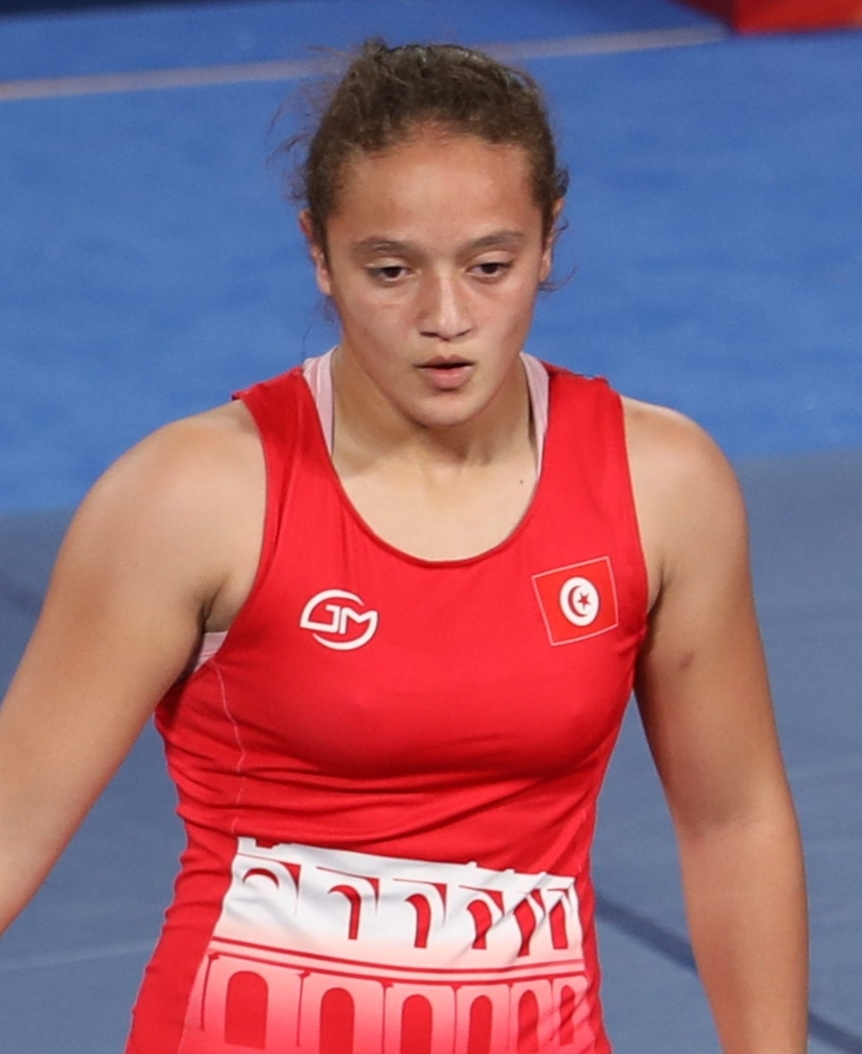
- Jlassi in 2018

Personal information
- Born: January 3, 2003 (age 23)

Sport
- Country: Tunisia
- Sport: Amateur wrestling
- Weight class: 65 kg
- Event: Freestyle
Medal record
Women's freestyle wrestling
Representing Tunisia
African Championships
Gold medal – first place	2023 Hammamet	65 kg
Silver medal – second place	2022 El Jadida	65 kg
Yasar Dogu Tournament
Bronze medal – third place	2022 Istanbul	65 kg
Dan Kolov - Nikola Petrov Tournament
Bronze medal – third place	2023 Sofia	65 kg
Bronze medal – third place	2024 Sofia	68 kg
World Juniors Championships
Bronze medal – third place	2022 Sofia	65 kg

Khadija Jlassi (born 3 January 2003) is a Tunisian freestyle wrestler. She is a two-time medalist, including gold, in the women's 65 kg event at the African Wrestling Championships.

== Career ==
Jlassi competed in the girls' freestyle 73 kg event at the 2018 Summer Youth Olympics held in Buenos Aires, Argentina. She finished in 7th place.

In 2021, Jlassi competed at the African & Oceania Wrestling Olympic Qualification Tournament hoping to qualify for the 2020 Summer Olympics in Tokyo, Japan. In that same year, she competed in the women's 65 kg event at the 2021 U23 World Wrestling Championships held in Belgrade, Serbia where she was eliminated in her second match.

Jlassi won one of the bronze medals in the women's 65 kg event at the 2022 Yasar Dogu Tournament held in Istanbul, Turkey. A few months later, she won the silver medal in her event at the 2022 African Wrestling Championships held in El Jadida, Morocco. She lost her bronze medal match in the women's 68 kg event at the Mediterranean Games held in Oran, Algeria.

Jlassi won the gold medal in her event at the 2022 Tunis Ranking Series event held in Tunis, Tunisia. She won one of the bronze medals in her event at the 2022 World Junior Wrestling Championships held in Sofia, Bulgaria.

Jlassi won the bronze medal in the women's 65 kg event at the 2023 Ibrahim Moustafa Tournament held in Alexandria, Egypt. She won one of the bronze medals in her event at the 2023 Dan Kolov & Nikola Petrov Tournament held in Sofia, Bulgaria. She won the gold medal in her event at the 2023 African Wrestling Championships held in Hammamet, Tunisia. In September 2023, she competed in the women's 68 kg event at the 2023 World Wrestling Championships held in Belgrade, Serbia.

== Achievements ==
Year	Tournament	Location	Result	Event
2022	African Wrestling Championships	El Jadida, Morocco	2nd	Freestyle 65 kg
2023	African Wrestling Championships	Hammamet, Tunisia	1st	Freestyle 65 kg
