= Khaled Omr Abdalla =

Egyptian freestyle wrestler

Personal information
- Native name: خالد عمر زكي محمد عبدالله
- Full name: Khaled Omr Zaki Mohamed Abdalla

Sport
- Country: Egypt
- Sport: Amateur wrestling
- Weight class: 125 kg
- Event: Freestyle
Medal record
Men's freestyle wrestling
Representing Egypt
African Games
Gold medal – first place	2019 Rabat	125 kg
African Championships
Gold medal – first place	2018 Port Harcourt	125 kg
Gold medal – first place	2019 Hammamet	125 kg

Khaled Omr Zaki Mohamed Abdalla (Arabic: خالد عمر زكي محمد عبدالله) is an Egyptian freestyle wrestler. At the African Wrestling Championships, he won the gold medal both in 2018 and 2019 in the men's freestyle 125 kg event.

In 2019, he represented Egypt at the African Games held in Rabat, Morocco and he won the gold medal in the men's freestyle 125 kg event.

== Achievements ==
Year	Tournament	Venue	Result	Event
2018	African Wrestling Championships	Port Harcourt, Nigeria	1st	Freestyle 125 kg
2019	African Wrestling Championships	Hammamet, Tunisia	1st	Freestyle 125 kg
2019	African Games	Rabat, Morocco	1st	Freestyle 125 kg
