= Gamal Mohamed (wrestler) =

Egyptian freestyle wrestler (1999–2026)

Personal information
- Native name: جمال محمد
- Full name: Gamal Abdelnaser Hanafy Mohamed
- Born: 24 February 1999 Cairo, Egypt
- Died: 28 June 2026 (aged 27)

Sport
- Country: Egypt
- Sport: Amateur wrestling
- Weight class: 57 kg
- Event: Freestyle
Medal record
Men's freestyle wrestling
Representing Egypt
African Championships
Gold medal – first place	2022 El Jadida	57 kg
Silver medal – second place	2023 Hammamet	57 kg
Bronze medal – third place	2018 Port Harcourt	57 kg
Bronze medal – third place	2019 Hammamet	57 kg
Bronze medal – third place	2020 Algiers	57 kg
African Games
Gold medal – first place	2023 Accra	57 kg
Bronze medal – third place	2019 Rabat	57 kg

Gamal Abdelnaser Hanafy Mohamed (Arabic: جمال عبد الناصر حنفي محمد; 24 February 1999 – 28 June 2026) was an Egyptian freestyle wrestler. He was a two-time medalist, including gold, in the men's 57 kg event at the African Games, and a five-time medalist, including gold, at the African Wrestling Championships. He represented Egypt at the 2024 Summer Olympics in Paris, France.

== Career ==
In 2019, he represented Egypt at the African Games held in Rabat, Morocco and he won one of the bronze medals in the 57 kg event.

In 2021, he competed at the African & Oceania Olympic Qualification Tournament hoping to qualify for the 2020 Summer Olympics in Tokyo, Japan.

Mohamed won the gold medal in the men's 57 kg event at the 2022 African Wrestling Championships held in El Jadida, Morocco. He won the silver medal in his event at the 2023 African Wrestling Championships held in Hammamet, Tunisia.

He competed in the men's freestyle 57 kg event at the 2024 Summer Olympics in Paris, France. He was eliminated in his first match by Darian Cruz of Puerto Rico.

== Death ==
Mohamed died while imprisoned on 28 June 2026, at the age of 27. His death was questioned as evidence of custodial impropriety.

== Achievements ==
Year	Tournament	Location	Result	Event
2018	African Wrestling Championships	Port Harcourt, Nigeria	3rd	Freestyle 57 kg
2019	African Wrestling Championships	Hammamet, Tunisia	3rd	Freestyle 57 kg
2019	African Games	Rabat, Morocco	3rd	Freestyle 57 kg
2020	African Wrestling Championships	Algiers, Algeria	3rd	Freestyle 57 kg
2022	African Wrestling Championships	El Jadida, Morocco	1st	Freestyle 57 kg
2023	African Wrestling Championships	Hammamet, Tunisia	2nd	Freestyle 57 kg
2024	African Games	Accra, Ghana	1st	Freestyle 57 kg
