= 2025 African Wrestling Championships =

- Host city: Casablanca, Morocco
- Dates: 29 April-4 May 2025
- Stadium: Salle Mohammed V

Champions
- Freestyle: Egypt
- Greco-Roman: Egypt
- Women: Nigeria

The 2025 Seniors, U20, U17 African Wrestling Championships was the 40th edition of African Wrestling Championships of combined events, and took place from 29 April to 4 May in Casablanca, Morocco.

== Seniors ==
=== Medal table ===
* Host nation (Morocco)

Rank	Nation	Gold	Silver	Bronze	Total
1	Egypt	11	8	5	24
2	Nigeria	10	1	1	12
3	Algeria	5	8	3	16
4	Tunisia	1	4	5	10
5	Morocco*	1	3	8	12
6	Guinea-Bissau	1	1	2	4
7	Cameroon	1	0	1	2
8	Senegal	0	2	2	4
9	Ivory Coast	0	2	0	2
10	South Africa	0	1	0	1
11	DR Congo	0	0	6	6
12	Cape Verde	0	0	2	2
12	Ghana	0	0	2	2
14	Benin	0	0	1	1
14	Central African Republic	0	0	1	1
14	Madagascar	0	0	1	1
Totals (16 entries)		30	30	40	100

=== Team ranking ===
Rank	Men's freestyle		Men's Greco-Roman		Women's freestyle	
Rank	Team	Points	Team	Points	Team	Points
1	Egypt	182	Egypt	235	Nigeria	225
2	Morocco	110	Morocco	160	Algeria	116
3	Algeria	105	Algeria	125	Egypt	115
4	Senegal	102	Democratic Republic of the Congo	76	Morocco	113
5	Nigeria	83	Kenya	60	Tunisia	75
6	Guinea-Bissau	75	Tunisia	55	South Africa	51
7	Democratic Republic of the Congo	65	Namibia	32	Ivory Coast	40
8	Tunisia	60	Benin	27	Madagascar	23
9	South Africa	58	Angola	24	Senegal	18
10	Cameroon	56	South Africa	19	Cameroon	17

=== Men's freestyle ===
Event	Gold	Silver	Bronze
57 kg	Diamantino Iuna Fafé; Guinea-Bissau	Salah Eddine Kateb; Algeria	Omar Faye; Senegal
57 kg	Diamantino Iuna Fafé; Guinea-Bissau	Salah Eddine Kateb; Algeria	Roland Nforsong; Cameroon
61 kg	Hassan Mohamed Elsayed; Egypt	Didier Diatta; Senegal	Khalil Barkouti; Tunisia
61 kg	Hassan Mohamed Elsayed; Egypt	Didier Diatta; Senegal	Redouane Sissaoui; Algeria
65 kg	Stephen Izolo; Nigeria	Farouk Jelassi; Tunisia	Said Ibrahim Elgahsh; Egypt
65 kg	Stephen Izolo; Nigeria	Farouk Jelassi; Tunisia	Wotna Cana Ndoc; Guinea-Bissau
70 kg	Khairiddine Ben Tlili; Tunisia	Mohamed Elsayed Ahmed; Egypt	Tope Joshua Adebayo; Nigeria
70 kg	Khairiddine Ben Tlili; Tunisia	Mohamed Elsayed Ahmed; Egypt	Gabriel Muanda; DR Congo
74 kg	Omar Mohamed Mourad; Egypt	Saad Bouguerra; Algeria	Caetano Antonio Sa; Guinea-Bissau
74 kg	Omar Mohamed Mourad; Egypt	Saad Bouguerra; Algeria	João Barbosa Vicente; Cape Verde
79 kg	Abdelkader Ikkal; Algeria	Mohammed Amine Bouziane; Morocco	Andy Mukendi; DR Congo
79 kg	Abdelkader Ikkal; Algeria	Mohammed Amine Bouziane; Morocco	Mbaye Diop; Senegal
86 kg	Ahmed Khaled Mahmoud; Egypt	Siny Sembène; Senegal	Houssem Oucif; Algeria
86 kg	Ahmed Khaled Mahmoud; Egypt	Siny Sembène; Senegal	Matteo Monteiro; Cape Verde
92 kg	Cédric Abossolo; Cameroon	Ebikeme Newlife; Nigeria	Mohamed Adel Ahmed; Egypt
97 kg	Aabdelrahman Sheyatan; Egypt	Gino Intchala; Guinea-Bissau	Barthelemy Tshosha; DR Congo
125 kg	Oussama Assad; Morocco	Youssef Aboudawaba; Egypt	Issah Fuseini; Ghana

=== Men's Greco-Roman ===
Event	Gold	Silver	Bronze
55 kg	Ahmed Hany Aly; Egypt	Adem Lamloum; Tunisia	Ayoub Sbete; Morocco
60 kg	Ahmed Abdelbary Shaban; Egypt	Mouad Jahid; Morocco	Rabby Kilandi; DR Congo
63 kg	Mohamed Yacine; Algeria	Youssef Mohamed; Egypt	Mouncif Mesrour; Morocco
67 kg	Mohamed Abdelrehim; Egypt	Ishak Ghaiou; Algeria	Oussama Nasr; Tunisia
72 kg	Mohamed Ibrahim El-Sayed; Egypt	Abdelmalek Merabet; Algeria	Walid Talbi; Morocco
72 kg	Mohamed Ibrahim El-Sayed; Egypt	Abdelmalek Merabet; Algeria	Yamine Atchiba; Benin
77 kg	Yehia Abdelkader; Egypt	Radhwen Tarhouni; Tunisia	Souhaib Khdar; Morocco
82 kg	Abd Ouakali; Algeria	Mohamed Dyab; Egypt	Elias Chiguer; Morocco
87 kg	Bachir Sid Azara; Algeria	Mahmoud Ibrahim; Egypt	Wadii Oualal; Morocco
97 kg	Mohamed Ali Gabr; Egypt	Hamza Boumadiene; Algeria	Barthelemy Tshosha; DR Congo
130 kg	Abdellatif Mohamed; Egypt	Wissam Kouainso; Morocco	Issah Fuseini; Ghana

=== Women's freestyle ===
Event	Gold	Silver	Bronze
50 kg	Mercy Genesis; Nigeria	Cheima Chebila; Algeria	Malak Ahmed; Egypt
53 kg	Christianah Ogunsanya; Nigeria	Nogona Bakayoko; Ivory Coast	Chahrazed Ayachi; Tunisia
53 kg	Christianah Ogunsanya; Nigeria	Nogona Bakayoko; Ivory Coast	Sama Mahmoud; Egypt
55 kg	Adijat Idris; Nigeria	Achouak Tekouk; Algeria	Lobna Ichaoui; Tunisia
57 kg	Chaimaa Aouissi; Algeria	Chaima Dahi; Tunisia	Mamy Rasoanomenjanahary; Madagascar
59 kg	Jumoke Adekoye; Nigeria	Rahma Bediwy; Egypt	Chahed Jeljeli; Tunisia
62 kg	Esther Kolawole; Nigeria	Farah Ali Hamada Hussein; Egypt	Nawel Bahloul; Algeria
65 kg	Ebipatei Mughenbofa; Nigeria	Cara Linda Du Plessis; South Africa	Mouda Hamdoun; Egypt
65 kg	Ebipatei Mughenbofa; Nigeria	Cara Linda Du Plessis; South Africa	Lec Hej Marlyne Ande; Central African Republic
68 kg	Hannah Rueben; Nigeria	Mariam Mesbah; Egypt	Saadia Et Tammar; Morocco
72 kg	Ebi Biogos; Nigeria	Yasmine Bouregba; Algeria	Rosie Tabora; DR Congo
76 kg	Damola Ojo; Nigeria	Amy Youin; Ivory Coast	Rayhana Benrezik; Morocco

=== Participating nations ===
204 competitors from 23 nations participated:

1. Algeria (19)
2. Angola (5)
3. Benin (5)
4. Central African Republic (1)
5. Ivory Coast (2)
6. Cameroon (6)
7. Democratic Republic of the Congo (15)
8. Cape Verde (6)
9. Egypt (27)
10. Guinea-Bissau (5)
11. Ghana (5)
12. Guinea (1)
13. Kenya (14)
14. Madagascar (3)
15. Morocco (30) (Host)
16. Mauritius (2)
17. Namibia (4)
18. Nigeria (16)
19. South Africa (13)
20. Senegal (10)
21. Sierra Leone (3)
22. Tunisia (11)
23. Uganda (1)

== U-20 (Juniors) ==
=== Medal table (U-20) ===
* Host nation (Morocco)

Rank	Nation	Gold	Silver	Bronze	Total
1	Egypt	16	7	0	23
2	Algeria	7	5	4	16
3	Tunisia	3	1	2	6
4	Morocco*	1	6	8	15
5	South Africa	1	5	3	9
6	Angola	1	3	0	4
7	DR Congo	0	1	6	7
8	Burundi	0	1	0	1
9	Kenya	0	0	3	3
9	Namibia	0	0	3	3
Totals (10 entries)		29	29	29	87

=== Team ranking ===
Rank	Men's freestyle		Men's Greco-Roman		Women's freestyle	
Rank	Team	Points	Team	Points	Team	Points
1	Egypt	175	Egypt	235	Egypt	165
2	Morocco	166	Morocco	144	Algeria	112
3	Algeria	130	Algeria	110	Morocco	95
4	South Africa	105	Democratic Republic of the Congo	62	South Africa	80
5	Democratic Republic of the Congo	45	South Africa	59	Kenya	65

=== Men's freestyle ===
Event	Gold	Silver	Bronze
57 kg	Ben Hachem Tarik; Morocco	Makaya Katendi; Angola	Ephraim Mwini; DR Congo
57 kg	Ben Hachem Tarik; Morocco	Makaya Katendi; Angola	Mouadh Chibani; Algeria
61 kg	Radouane Sissaoui; Algeria	Mokbel Sahli; Tunisia	Roehan du Plessis; South Africa
65 kg	Walid Ben Zamime; Tunisia	Amr Elshaer; Egypt	Gabriel Yanga; DR Congo
70 kg	Mohamed Ahmed; Egypt	Stefan Gouws; South Africa	Mourad Saad; Algeria
74 kg	Omar Mourad; Egypt	Jesse van Baalen; South Africa	Hamza Argoubi; Morocco
79 kg	Yahya Elgamal; Egypt	Omar Lambarraa; Morocco	Miche Ngangala; DR Congo
86 kg	Houssem Oucif; Algeria	Mohamed El Mekkaoui; Morocco	Brendt Kriessbach; Namibia
92 kg	Abderrahmane Meziti; Algeria	Mohamed Ahmed; Egypt	Ahmed Rajay; Morocco
97 kg	Aabdelrahman Sheyatan; Egypt	Leander Steyn; South Africa	Riad El Hariri; Morocco
125 kg	Youssef Aboudawaba; Egypt	Ryad Bouchareb; Morocco	Noureddine Bouroufa; Algeria

=== Men's Greco-Roman ===
Event	Gold	Silver	Bronze
55 kg	Mohamed Shaaban; Algeria	Abdallah Dahmani; Morocco	Teophilus Seveleni; Namibia
60 kg	Ahmed Shaban; Egypt	Adel Fegas; Algeria	Lazarus Haimbodi; Namibia
63 kg	Amr Elshaer; Egypt	Zakaria Hacini; Algeria	Youssef Karim; Morocco
67 kg	Mohamed Abdelrehim; Egypt	Miguel Antonio; Angola	Gabriel Yanga; DR Congo
72 kg	Mohamed Ibrahim; Egypt	Miguel Antonio; Angola	Gabriel Yanga; DR Congo
77 kg	Omar Mourad; Egypt	Harryson Nsiamaza; DR Congo	Neil Scholtz; South Africa
82 kg	Dhiyaeddine Remmache; Algeria	Yaya Elgamal; Egypt	Miche Ngangala; DR Congo
87 kg	Bilel Hafdallah; Tunisia	Mohamed Ahmed; Egypt	Youssef El Badaoui; Morocco
97 kg	Noureddine Bouroufa; Algeria	Youssef Raya; Egypt	Anwar Belfakih; Morocco
130 kg	Youssef Aboudawaba; Egypt	Mustapha Abidi; Morocco	None awarded

=== Women's freestyle ===
Event	Gold	Silver	Bronze
50 kg	Chloe Brewis; South Africa	Malak Ahmed; Egypt	Douaa Khenchouche; Algeria
53 kg	Sama Mahmoud; Egypt	Fatima Bouchibi; Algeria	Vivian Odongo; Kenya
55 kg	Salma Elbostany; Egypt	Dounia Zitouni; Algeria	Chaima Dahi; Tunisia
57 kg	Chahd Jeljeli; Tunisia	Douaa Bhar; Morocco	Ivyone Masibo; Kenya
59 kg	Rahma Bediwy; Egypt	Gloria Niyonkuru; Burundi	Saida Cheridi; Tunisia
62 kg	Ritag Elmalty; Egypt	Katelyn Swan; South Africa	Salma El Ofer; Morocco
65 kg	Mouda Hamdoun; Egypt	Selsabil Rouabah; Algeria	Jessica Eagar; South Africa
68 kg	Joseth Mavungu; Angola	Mariam Mesbah; Egypt	Faith Wamalwa; Kenya
72 kg	Yasmine Bouregba; Algeria	Eryn Marais; South Africa	Marwa Khoudri; Morocco

=== Participating nations ===
127 competitors from 11 nations participated:

1. Algeria (17)
2. Angola (7)
3. Burundi (2)
4. Democratic Republic of the Congo (8)
5. Egypt (25)
6. Kenya (11)
7. Madagascar (2)
8. Morocco (28) (Host)
9. Namibia (5)
10. South Africa (16)
11. Tunisia (6)

== U-17 (Cadets) ==
=== Medal table (U-17) ===
* Host nation (Morocco)

Rank	Nation	Gold	Silver	Bronze	Total
1	Algeria	9	6	1	16
2	Egypt	9	4	1	14
3	DR Congo	4	1	0	5
4	Tunisia	3	3	10	16
5	South Africa	2	6	5	13
6	Angola	1	5	2	8
7	Morocco*	1	1	5	7
8	Kenya	0	2	3	5
9	Burundi	0	1	0	1
10	Madagascar	0	0	1	1
Totals (10 entries)		29	29	28	86

=== Team ranking ===
Rank	Men's freestyle		Men's Greco-Roman		Women's freestyle	
Rank	Team	Points	Team	Points	Team	Points
1	South Africa	141	Egypt	165	South Africa	100
2	Algeria	140	Algeria	140	Morocco	96
3	Egypt	117	Tunisia	132	Kenya	95
4	Morocco	112	Morocco	96	Algeria	90
5	Tunisia	109	Angola	75	Tunisia	80

=== Men's freestyle ===
Event	Gold	Silver	Bronze
45 kg	Youcef Boukhalfa; Algeria	Motuim Ahmed; Egypt	Anouar Rajay; Morocco
48 kg	Anis Bouguerra; Algeria	Mohamed Ben Salah; Tunisia	Henrique Ngoma; Angola
51 kg	Makaya Katendi; Angola	Houdaifa Barkat; Algeria	Mohamed Aziz Arfaoui; Tunisia
55 kg	Abderrazak Chenini; Algeria	Mustapha Batnini; Tunisia	Youssef Aboushoala; Egypt
60 kg	Juan Groenewald; South Africa	Diasivi Renato; Angola	Mohamed Ben Hamed; Tunisia
65 kg	Gradi Mantu Diwa; DR Congo	Tahar Djeffal; Algeria	Ruan Nel; South Africa
71 kg	Miscael Nzuzi Nkunga; DR Congo	Marthinus de Wet; South Africa	Raphael Mpandresy; Madagascar
80 kg	Yassin Ezzat; Egypt	Dario Lundequesse; Angola	Andru de Beer; South Africa
92 kg	Abderrahmane Meziti; Algeria	Youssef Raya; Egypt	Christiaan Boshoff; South Africa
110 kg	Essam Hussein; Egypt	Willem Piet Human; South Africa	Amen Kouki; Tunisia

=== Men's Greco-Roman ===
Event	Gold	Silver	Bronze
45 kg	Mohamed Rayen Salhi; Tunisia	Motuim Ahmed; Egypt	Walid Es-Sahbani; Morocco
48 kg	Mohamed Emad El-Tayeb; Egypt	Mohamed Ben Salah; Tunisia	Henrique Ngoma; Angola
51 kg	Youssef Aboushala; Egypt	Makaya Katendi; Angola	Mohamed Arfaoui; Tunisia
55 kg	Kheireddine Ghaouar; Algeria	Mohamed Shaaban; Egypt	Mustapha Batnini; Tunisia
60 kg	Wail Benaissa; Algeria	Diasivi Renato; Angola	Mohamed Ben Hamed; Tunisia
65 kg	Gradi Mantu Diwa; DR Congo	Ademteje Dechache; Algeria	Amen Jandoubi; Tunisia
71 kg	Firas Hamata; Algeria	Miscael Nzuzi Nkunga; DR Congo	Abdeljalil Benelyassar; Morocco
80 kg	Yassin Ezzat; Egypt	Dario Lundequesse; Angola	Mohamed Amine Ferchichi; Tunisia
92 kg	Youssef Ali Raya; Egypt	Christiaan Pieter Boshoff; South Africa	Skander Benmohamed; Algeria
110 kg	Essam Hussein; Egypt	Mounder Djemouai; Algeria	Willem Piet Human; South Africa

=== Women's freestyle ===
Event	Gold	Silver	Bronze
43 kg	Mareim Ahmed Abdelaal; Egypt	Meriem Safiya Grib; Algeria	Islam Benzbiria; Morocco
46 kg	Rahma Rezgui; Tunisia	Liesse Rukundorwimana; Burundi	Fatima Zahra El-Fririkh; Morocco
49 kg	Emna Hammami; Tunisia	Hajar Kaneb; Morocco	Shalying Joy; Kenya
53 kg	Dounia Zitouni; Algeria	Vivian Adhiambo Odongo; Kenya	Mouna Snoussi; Tunisia
57 kg	Bometela Noella Madundu; DR Congo	Shannon Jansen van Rensburg; South Africa	Joy Lichuma Wafula; Kenya
61 kg	Ritag Elmaty; Egypt	Melissa Boussaidi; Algeria	Katelyn Swan; South Africa
65 kg	Selsabil Rouabah; Algeria	Jessica Ogechukwu Eagar; South Africa	Jemimah Wanjala; Kenya
69 kg	Eryn Jenna Marais; South Africa	Janet Ingwesi Omumasaba; Kenya	None awarded
73 kg	Malak Sabry; Morocco	Dune van Zyl; South Africa	Molka Bouzayani; Tunisia

=== Participating nations ===
133 competitors from 14 nations participated:

1. Algeria (17)
2. Angola (8)
3. Burundi (3)
4. Central African Republic (1)
5. Cameroon (1)
6. Democratic Republic of the Congo (5)
7. Egypt (15)
8. Ghana (1)
9. Kenya (14)
10. Madagascar (1)
11. Morocco (26) (Host)
12. Namibia (2)
13. South Africa (19)
14. Tunisia (20)
