= Faten Hammami =

Tunisian freestyle wrestler

Sport
- Country: Tunisia
- Sport: Amateur wrestling
- Weight class: 53 kg; 55 kg; 57 kg
- Event: Freestyle
Medal record
Women's freestyle wrestling
Representing Tunisia
African Championships
Gold medal – first place	2019 Hammamet	55 kg
Silver medal – second place	2018 Port Harcourt	55 kg
Silver medal – second place	2022 El Jadida	55 kg
Silver medal – second place	2023 Hammamet	57 kg
Bronze medal – third place	2024 Alexandria	57 kg
African Games
Bronze medal – third place	2019 Rabat	53 kg

Faten Hammami is a Tunisian freestyle wrestler. She represented Tunisia at the 2019 African Games held in Rabat, Morocco and she won the bronze medal in the 53 kg event.

In 2019, she also won the gold medal in the 55 kg event at the African Wrestling Championships held in Hammamet, Tunisia.

She won the silver medal in her event at the 2022 African Wrestling Championships held in El Jadida, Morocco.

== Achievements ==
Year	Tournament	Location	Result	Event
2018	African Wrestling Championships	Port Harcourt, Nigeria	2nd	Freestyle 55 kg
2019	African Wrestling Championships	Hammamet, Tunisia	1st	Freestyle 55 kg
2019	African Games	Rabat, Morocco	3rd	Freestyle 53 kg
2022	African Wrestling Championships	El Jadida, Morocco	2nd	Freestyle 55 kg
2023	African Wrestling Championships	Hammamet, Tunisia	2nd	Freestyle 57 kg
2024	African Wrestling Championships	Alexandria, Egypt	3rd	Freestyle 57 kg
