= Zaineb Sghaier =

Tunisian freestyle wrestler (born 2002)

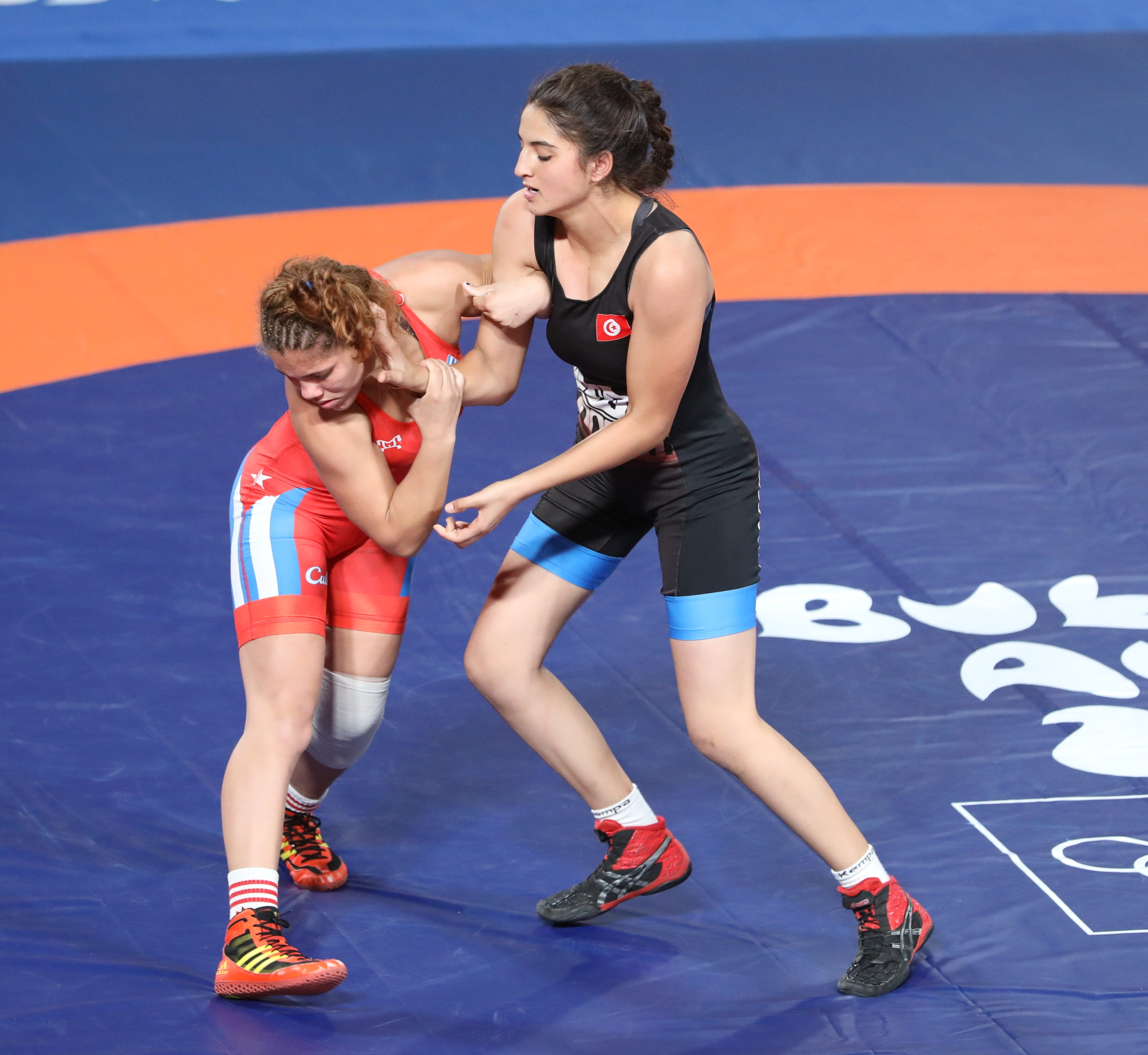
- Zaineb Sghaier in 2018 (wearing black)

Personal information
- Born: 25 September 2002 (age 24)

Sport
- Country: Tunisia
- Sport: Amateur wrestling
- Weight class: 72 kg; 76 kg
- Event: Freestyle
Medal record
Women's freestyle wrestling
Representing Tunisia
Mediterranean Games
Bronze medal – third place	2026 Taranto	68 kg
African Championships
Gold medal – first place	2020 Algiers	72 kg
Gold medal – first place	2024 Alexandria	76 kg
Gold medal – first place	2026 Alexandria	72 kg
Silver medal – second place	2022 El Jadida	72 kg
Bronze medal – third place	2023 Hammamet	72 kg

Zaineb Sghaier (born 25 September 2002) is a Tunisian freestyle wrestler. She is a five-time medalist, including three gold medals, at the African Wrestling Championships. She represented Tunisia at the 2020 Summer Olympics in Tokyo, Japan and the 2024 Summer Olympics in Paris, France.

== Career ==
Sghaier competed in the girls' freestyle 65 kg event at the 2018 Summer Youth Olympics held in Buenos Aires, Argentina. She finished in 7th place.

At the 2020 African Wrestling Championships held in Algiers, Algeria, Sghaier won the gold medal in the women's 72 kg event. She qualified at the 2021 African & Oceania Wrestling Olympic Qualification Tournament to represent Tunisia at the 2020 Summer Olympics in Tokyo, Japan. Sghaier competed in the women's freestyle 76 kg event. She lost her first match, against eventual silver medalist Adeline Gray of the United States, and she was then eliminated in the repechage by Yasemin Adar of Turkey. Adar won one of the bronze medals in the competition.

In November 2021, Sghaier competed in the 72 kg event at the U23 World Wrestling Championships held in Belgrade, Serbia. She won the silver medal in her event at the 2022 African Wrestling Championships held in El Jadida, Morocco. A few months later, Sghaier competed in the 76 kg event at the 2022 Mediterranean Games held in Oran, Algeria. She was eliminated in her first match by eventual bronze medalist Kendra Dacher of France. She won one of the bronze medals in her event at the 2022 Tunis Ranking Series event held in Tunis, Tunisia.

Sghaier won the bronze medal in her event at the 2023 African Wrestling Championships held in Hammamet, Tunisia. She won the gold medal in the women's 76 kg event at the 2024 African Wrestling Championships held in Alexandria, Egypt. Sghaier also competed at the 2024 African & Oceania Wrestling Olympic Qualification Tournament held in the same location and she earned a quota place for Tunisia for the 2024 Summer Olympics in Paris, France. She competed in the women's 76 kg event at the Olympics.

Sghaier returned to wrestling in 2026, winning a gold in the women's 72 kg event at the African Wrestling Championships.

== Achievements ==
Year	Tournament	Location	Result	Event
2020	African Championships	Algiers, Algeria	1st	Freestyle 72 kg
2022	African Championships	El Jadida, Morocco	2nd	Freestyle 72 kg
2023	African Championships	Hammamet, Tunisia	3rd	Freestyle 72 kg
2024	African Championships	Alexandria, Egypt	1st	Freestyle 76 kg
2026	African Championships	Alexandria, Egypt	1st	Freestyle 72 kg
2026	Mediterranean Games	Taranto, Italy	3rd	Freestyle 68 kg
