= Ibtissem Doudou =

Algerian freestyle wrestler (born 1999)

Personal information
- Nationality: Algerian
- Born: 20 November 1999 (age 26)
- Weight: 50 kg (110 lb)

Sport
- Sport: Amateur wrestling
- Event: Freestyle wrestling
Medal record
Women's freestyle wrestling
Representing Algeria
African Games
Bronze medal – third place	2019 Rabat	50 kg
Mediterranean Games
Bronze medal – third place	2026 Taranto	50 kg
African Championships
Bronze medal – third place	2020 Algiers	50 kg
Bronze medal – third place	2022 El Jadida	50 kg
Bronze medal – third place	2023 Hammamet	53 kg
Bronze medal – third place	2024 Alexandria	50 kg

Ibtissem Doudou (Arabic: ابتسام دودو; born 20 November 1999) is an Algerian freestyle wrestler who competes in the 50 kg division.

Doudou is a bronze medalist at the 2019 African Games and a multiple bronze medalist at the African Wrestling Championships (2020, 2022, 2023, 2024). She represented Algeria at the 2024 Summer Olympics in Paris, finishing 14th in the women's 50 kg event.
