= Bachir Sid Azara =

Algerian Greco-Roman wrestler

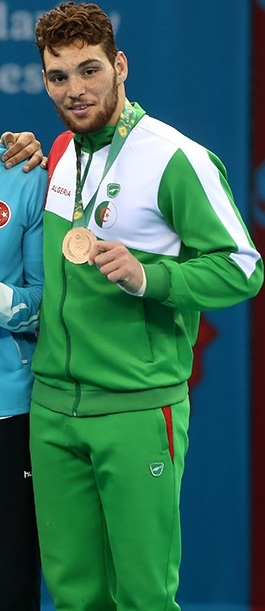
- Sid Azara at the 2017 Islamic Solidarity Games

Personal information
- Native name: بشير سيد عزارة
- Born: 3 March 1996 (age 30)

Sport
- Country: Algeria
- Sport: Amateur wrestling
- Weight class: 87 kg
- Event: Greco-Roman
Medal record
Men's Greco-Roman wrestling
Representing Algeria
African Championships
Gold medal – first place	2016 Alexandria	80 kg
Gold medal – first place	2017 Marrakesh	80 kg
Gold medal – first place	2020 Algiers	87 kg
Gold medal – first place	2022 El Jadida	87 kg
Gold medal – first place	2023 Hammamet	87 kg
Gold medal – first place	2025 Casablanca	87 kg
Silver medal – second place	2015 Alexandria	85 kg
Silver medal – second place	2018 Port Harcourt	82 kg
Silver medal – second place	2019 Hammamet	87 kg
African Games
Gold medal – first place	2019 Rabat	87 kg
Gold medal – first place	2023 Accra	87 kg
Silver medal – second place	2015 Brazzaville	80 kg
Mediterranean Games
Gold medal – first place	2022 Oran	87 kg
Silver medal – second place	2018 Tarragona	87 kg
Bronze medal – third place	2026 Taranto	87 kg
Islamic Solidarity Games
Bronze medal – third place	2017 Baku	80 kg
Bronze medal – third place	2025 Riyadh	87 kg
Dan Kolov - Nikola Petrov Tournament
Bronze medal – third place	2015 Sofia	80 kg
Bronze medal – third place	2023 Sofia	87 kg

Bachir Sid Azara (Arabic: بشير سيد عزارة, born 3 March 1996) is an Algerian Greco-Roman wrestler. At the African Wrestling Championships he won a total of nine medals: six gold medals and three silver medals. He is also a gold medalist at the 2019 African Games, the 2022 Mediterranean Games and the 2023 African Games.

== Career ==
He represented Algeria at the 2019 African Games held in Rabat, Morocco and he won the gold medal in the men's 87 kg event. In 2015, he also competed at the African Games and he won the silver medal in the men's 80 kg event at the time.

In 2020, he competed in the men's 87 kg event at the Individual Wrestling World Cup held in Belgrade, Serbia. He qualified at the 2021 African & Oceania Wrestling Olympic Qualification Tournament to represent Algeria at the 2020 Summer Olympics in Tokyo, Japan. He competed in the 87 kg event. He won his first match against Peng Fei of China and then lost against eventual gold medalist Zhan Beleniuk of Ukraine. In the repechage he was then eliminated by eventual bronze medalist Zurab Datunashvili of Serbia.

He won the gold medal in his event at the 2022 African Wrestling Championships held in El Jadida, Morocco. He won the gold medal in the 87 kg event at the 2022 Mediterranean Games held in Oran, Algeria. In the final, he defeated Mirco Minguzzi of Italy. He competed in the 87 kg event at the 2022 World Wrestling Championships held in Belgrade, Serbia.

He won one of the bronze medals in the 87 kg event at the 2023 Dan Kolov & Nikola Petrov Tournament held in Sofia, Bulgaria.

He competed in the 87 kg event at the 2024 Summer Olympics in Paris, France.

== Achievements ==
Year	Tournament	Location	Result	Event
2015	African Games	Brazzaville, Republic of the Congo	2nd	Greco-Roman 80 kg
2017	Islamic Solidarity Games	Baku, Azerbaijan	3rd	Greco-Roman 80 kg
2018	Mediterranean Games	Tarragona, Spain	2nd	Greco-Roman 87 kg
2019	African Games	Rabat, Morocco	1st	Greco-Roman 87 kg
2022	African Wrestling Championships	El Jadida, Morocco	1st	Greco-Roman 87 kg
2022	Mediterranean Games	Oran, Algeria	1st	Greco-Roman 87 kg
2023	African Wrestling Championships	Hammamet, Tunisia	1st	Greco-Roman 87 kg
2024	African Games	Accra, Ghana	1st	Greco-Roman 87 kg
