= Christianah Ogunsanya =

Nigerian freestyle wrestler (born 2002)

Personal information
- Full name: Christianah Tolulope Ogunsanya
- Born: 12 January 2002 (age 24) Akure, Nigeria
- Weight: 53 kg (117 lb)

Sport
- Sport: Amateur wrestling
- Event: Freestyle wrestling
Medal record
Women's freestyle wrestling
Representing Nigeria
African Championships
Gold medal – first place	2023 Hammamet	53 kg
Gold medal – first place	2024 Alexandria	53 kg
Gold medal – first place	2025 Casablanca	53 kg
African Games
Gold medal – first place	2023 Accra	53 kg
Islamic Solidarity Games
Gold medal – first place	2025 Riyadh	53 kg
U23 World Championships
Bronze medal – third place	2025 Novi Sad	53 kg

Christianah Tolulope Ogunsanya (born 12 January 2002) is a Nigerian freestyle wrestler who competes in the 53 kg division.

== Career ==
Christianah Ogunsanya represented Nigeria at the 2024 Summer Olympics in Paris, finishing 13th in the women's 53 kg event. Ogunsanya placed 16th at the 2023 World Wrestling Championships.

She is a gold medalist at the 2023 African Games and a three-time African Wrestling Championships champion (2023, 2024, 2025). As a junior, she also won the African Youth Games and the African Cadet Championships in 2018 and participated in the 2018 Summer Youth Olympics, placing 9th.

== Education ==
As of 2025, Ogunsanya attends and also competes for William Penn University, an NAIA program in Oskaloosa, Iowa, USA. She is majoring in Kinesiology.

She was a finalist for the 2025 Anthony-Maroulis Trophy.
