= Hannah Reuben =

Nigerian wrestler and soldier

Personal information
- Full name: Hannah Amuchechi Reuben
- Nationality: Nigerian
- Born: 14 February 1994 (age 32)
- Height: 165 cm (5 ft 5 in)
- Weight: 69 kg (152 lb)

Sport
- Sport: Freestyle Wrestling
- Event: -69 kg
Medal record
Women's freestyle wrestling
Representing Nigeria
African Championships
Gold medal – first place	2025 Casablanca	76 kg
Silver medal – second place	2022 El Jadida	76 kg
Silver medal – second place	2023 Hammamet	76 kg
Silver medal – second place	2024 Alexandria	76 kg
African Games
Gold medal – first place	2023 Accra	76 kg
Silver medal – second place	2015 Brazzaville	69 kg
Commonwealth Games
Silver medal – second place	2022 Birmingham	76 kg
Bronze medal – third place	2014 Glasgow	69 kg
World Military Championships
Gold medal – first place	2023 Baku	68 kg

Hannah Amuchechi Reuben (born 14 February 1994) is a wrestler and corporal in the Nigerian Army who won a silver medal at the 2015 African Games. She won a gold medal at the 2024 African/Oceania Olympic qualifiers and secured a place in the Paris 2024 Olympics after defeating Ivory Coast's Amy Youin in the 76 kg women's final.

== Career ==
Before going fully into wrestling, she has participated in other sports such as boxing, swimming and judo.

Reuben started wrestling in 2008. Since the beginning of her wrestling career, she has competed in 69 kg at the 2016 Rio Summer Olympics in Brazil, and African Championship in Hammamet, Tunisia.

She has won several awards including gold medal in the 69 kg category at the Governor Dickson National Classics, her silver medal in the 2015 edition of the quadrennial championship which took place at Brazzaville.

In 2023, she represented the Armed Forces of Nigeria at the 36th World Military Wrestling Championship in Azerbaijan, where she won the gold medal in the women's 76 kg category.
