= Mohamed Ehab Khalil =

Egyptian Greco-Roman wrestler

Mohamed Zahab Khalil
Personal information
- Full name: Mohamed Ehab Mohamed Zahab Khalil

Sport
- Country: Egypt
- Sport: Amateur wrestling
- Event: Greco-Roman
Medal record
Men's Greco-Roman wrestling
Representing Egypt
African Games
Silver medal – second place	2019 Rabat	77 kg
African Championships
Gold medal – first place	2022 El Jadida	72 kg
Gold medal – first place	2023 Hammamet	77 kg
Silver medal – second place	2019 Hammamet	77 kg
Bronze medal – third place	2018 Port Harcourt	77 kg

Mohamed Ehab Mohamed Zahab Khalil is an Egyptian Greco-Roman wrestler. He is a silver medalist at the African Games and a four-time medalist, including two gold medals, at the African Wrestling Championships.

In 2019, he represented Egypt at the African Games held in Rabat, Morocco and he won the silver medal in the men's 77 kg event.

He won the gold medal in his event at the 2022 African Wrestling Championships held in El Jadida, Morocco.

== Achievements ==
Year	Tournament	Location	Result	Event
2018	African Wrestling Championships	Port Harcourt, Nigeria	3rd	Greco-Roman 77 kg
2019	African Wrestling Championships	Hammamet, Tunisia	2nd	Greco-Roman 77 kg
2019	African Games	Rabat, Morocco	2nd	Greco-Roman 77 kg
2022	African Wrestling Championships	El Jadida, Morocco	1st	Greco-Roman 72 kg
2023	African Wrestling Championships	Hammamet, Tunisia	1st	Greco-Roman 77 kg
