= Adijat Idris =

Nigerian female freestyle wrestler

Personal information
- Full name: Adijat Avorshai Idris
- Nationality: Nigerian
- Born: 6 December 2001 (age 24)

Sport
- Country: Nigeria
- Sport: Wrestling
- Weight class: 50 kg / 55 kg
- Event: Freestyle wrestling
Medal record
Women's freestyle wrestling
Representing Nigeria
African Championships
| Gold medal – first place | Alexandria 2024 | 55 kg |
| Gold medal – first place | Casablanca 2025 | 55 kg |
| Gold medal – first place | Alexandria 2026 | 55 kg |

Adijat Avorshai Idris (born 6 December 2001) is a Nigerian freestyle wrestler. She is a two-time African champion, having won the gold medal at the 2024 African Wrestling Championships and the 2025 African Wrestling Championships.
