= Wrestling at the 2018 Summer Youth Olympics – Girls' freestyle 65 kg =

Girls' freestyle 65kg at the III Summer Youth Olympic Games
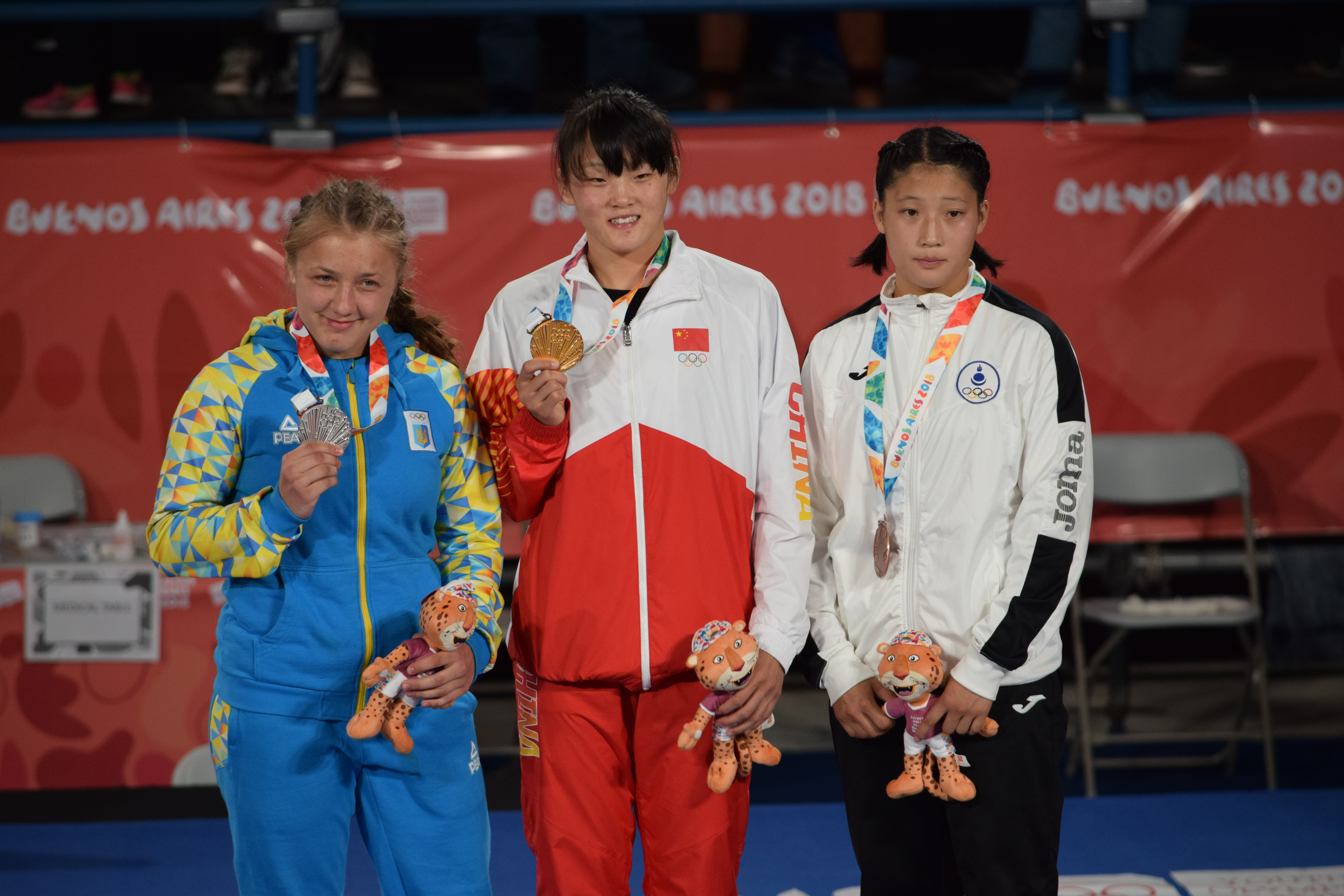
- The medalists
- Venue: Asia Pavilion
- Date: 13 October 2018
- Competitors: 10 from 10 nations

Medalists
1st place, gold medalist(s)		Zhou Xinru	China
2nd place, silver medalist(s)		Oksana Chudyk	Ukraine
3rd place, bronze medalist(s)		Oyun-Erdene Tamir	Mongolia

The girls' freestyle 65 kg competition at the 2018 Summer Youth Olympics was held on 13 October, at the Asia Pavilion.

== Competition format ==
As there were ten wrestlers in a weight category, the pool phase will be run as a single group competing in a round-robin format. Ranking within the groups is used to determine the pairings for the final phase.

== Schedule ==
All times are in local time (UTC-3).

Date	Time	Round
Saturday, 13 October 2018	10:15; 11:05; 11:55; 12:45; 13:35; 18:35	Round 1 Round 2 Round 3 Round 4 Round 5 Finals

== Results ==
Legend

- F — Won by fall

Group Stages

Qualified for the Gold-medal match
Qualified for the Bronze-medal match
Qualified for the 5th/6th Place Match
Qualified for the 7th/8th Place Match
Qualified for the 9th/10th Place Match

Group A

Pos	Athlete	Pld	W	L	CP	TP	Qualification
1	Zhou Xinru (CHN)	4	4	0	14	33	Gold-medal match
2	Oyun-Erdene Tamir (MGL)	4	3	1	14	14	Bronze-medal match
3	Roxana Capezan (ROU)	4	2	2	10	25	Classification 5th/6th place match
4	Yetzis Ramírez (CUB)	4	1	3	3	2	Classification 7th/8th place match
5	Sandra Escamilla (MEX)	4	0	4	1	2	Classification 9th/10th place match

Source: UWW

	Score		CP
Oyun-Erdene Tamir (MGL)	4–1 Fall	Sandra Escamilla (MEX)	5–0 VFA
Yetzis Ramírez (CUB)	0–11	Roxana Capezan (ROU)	0–4 VSU
Zhou Xinru (CHN)	11–1	Oyun-Erdene Tamir (MGL)	4–1 VSU1
Sandra Escamilla (MEX)	1–2	Yetzis Ramírez (CUB)	1–3 VPO1
Roxana Capezan (ROU)	2–4	Oyun-Erdene Tamir (MGL)	1–3 VPO1
Zhou Xinru (CHN)	3–0	Sandra Escamilla (MEX)	3–0 VPO
Yetzis Ramírez (CUB)	0–5 Fall	Oyun-Erdene Tamir (MGL)	0–5 VFA
Roxana Capezan (ROU)	2–9	Zhou Xinru (CHN)	1–3 VPO1
Sandra Escamilla (MEX)	0–10	Roxana Capezan (ROU)	0–4 VSU
Yetzis Ramírez (CUB)	0–10	Zhou Xinru (CHN)	0–4 VSU

Group B

Pos	Athlete	Pld	W	L	CP	TP	Qualification
1	Oksana Chudyk (UKR)	4	4	0	13	23	Gold-medal match
2	Sunmisola Balogun (NGR)	4	3	1	11	27	Bronze-medal match
3	Viktoria Vesso (EST)	4	2	2	11	10	Classification 5th/6th place match
4	Zaineb Sghaier (TUN)	4	1	3	5	11	Classification 7th/8th place match
5	Natacha Nabaina (CMR)	4	0	4	1	9	Classification 9th/10th place match

Source: UWW

	Score		CP
Natacha Nabaina (CMR)	0–10	Sunmisola Balogun (NGR)	0–4 VSU
Viktoria Vesso (EST)	7–1 Fall	Zaineb Sghaier (TUN)	5–0 VFA
Oksana Chudyk (UKR)	10–3	Natacha Nabaina (CMR)	3–1 VPO1
Sunmisola Balogun (NGR)	7–0	Viktoria Vesso (EST)	3–0 VPO
Zaineb Sghaier (TUN)	10–6 Fall	Natacha Nabaina (CMR)	5–0 VFA
Oksana Chudyk (UKR)	2–1	Sunmisola Balogun (NGR)	3–1 VPO1
Viktoria Vesso (EST)	2–0 Fall	Natacha Nabaina (CMR)	5–0 VFA
Zaineb Sghaier (TUN)	0–10	Oksana Chudyk (UKR)	0–4 VSU
Sunmisola Balogun (NGR)	9–0	Zaineb Sghaier (TUN)	3–0 VPO
Viktoria Vesso (EST)	1–1	Oksana Chudyk (UKR)	1–3 VPO1

=== Finals ===
Gold-medal match
Zhou Xinru (CHN)	10
Oksana Chudyk (UKR)	0

Bronze-medal match
Oyun-Erdene Tamir (MGL)	15
Sunmisola Balogun (NGR)	4

Classification 5th/6th place match
Roxana Capezan (ROU)	2
Viktoria Vesso (EST)	6^{F}

Classification 7th/8th place match
Yetzis Ramírez (CUB)	1
Zaineb Sghaier (TUN)	1

Classification 9th/10th place match
Sandra Escamilla (MEX)	WO
~~Natacha Nabaina (CMR)~~

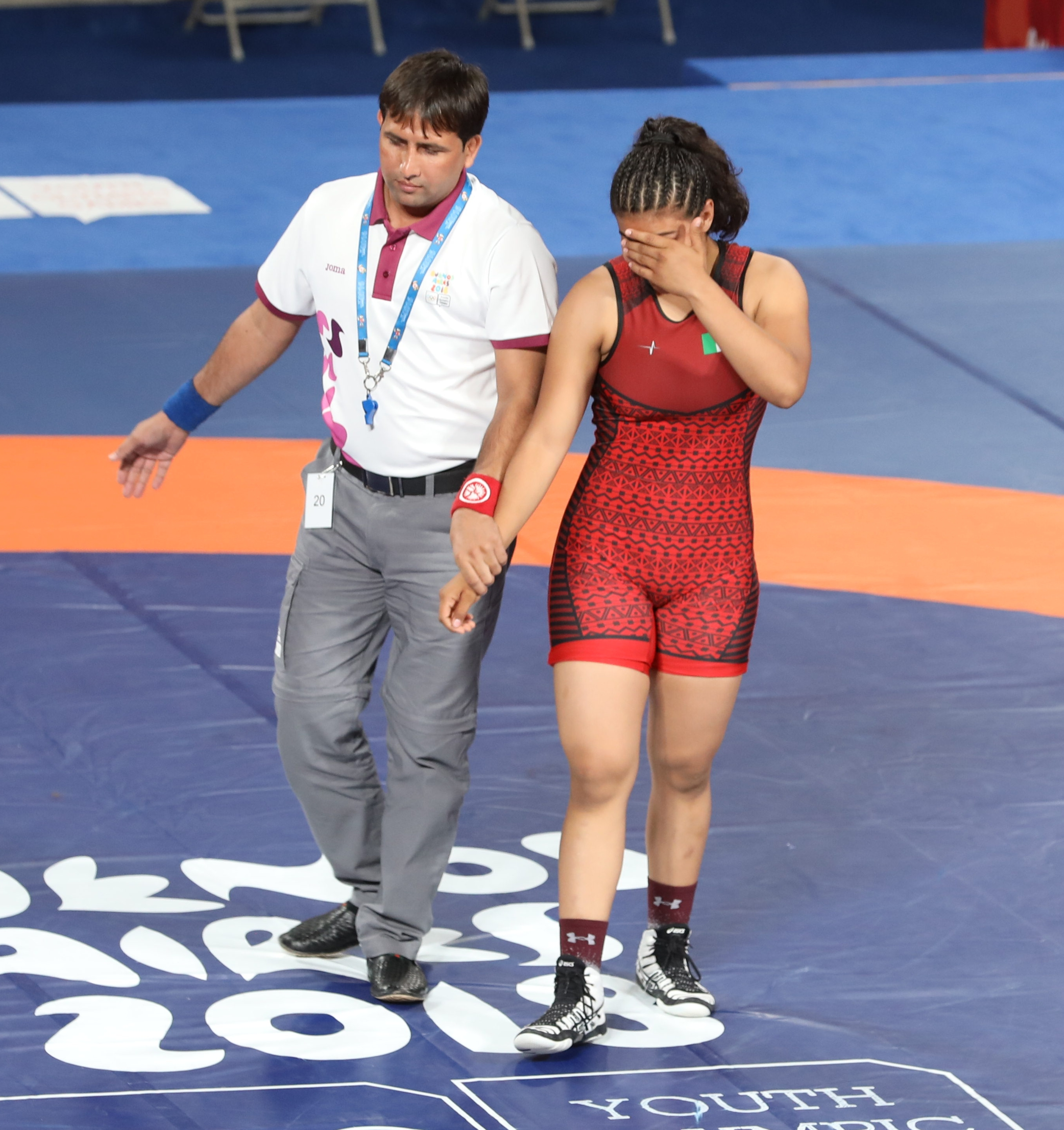
Classification 9th/10th Place

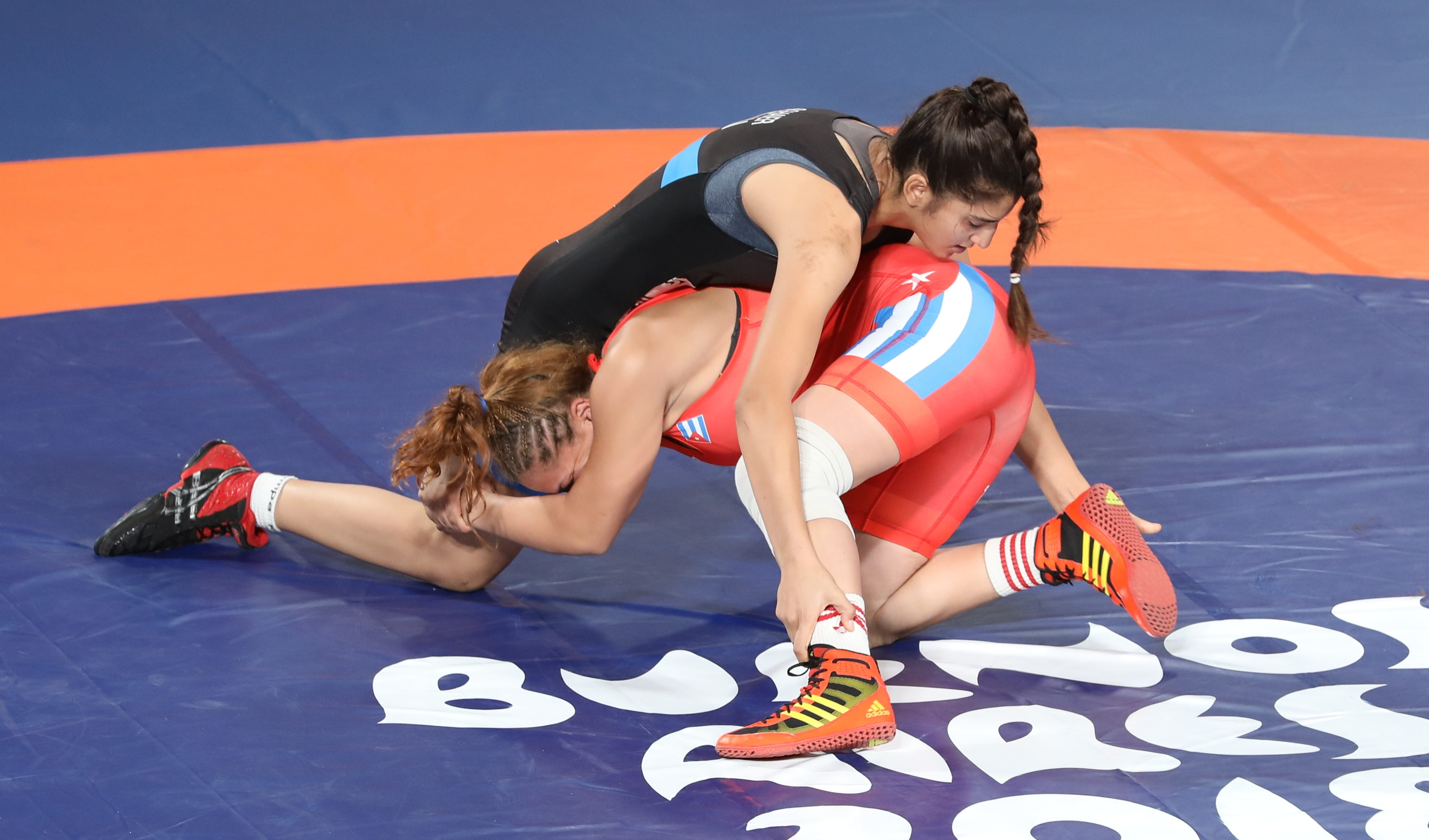
Classification 7th/8th Place

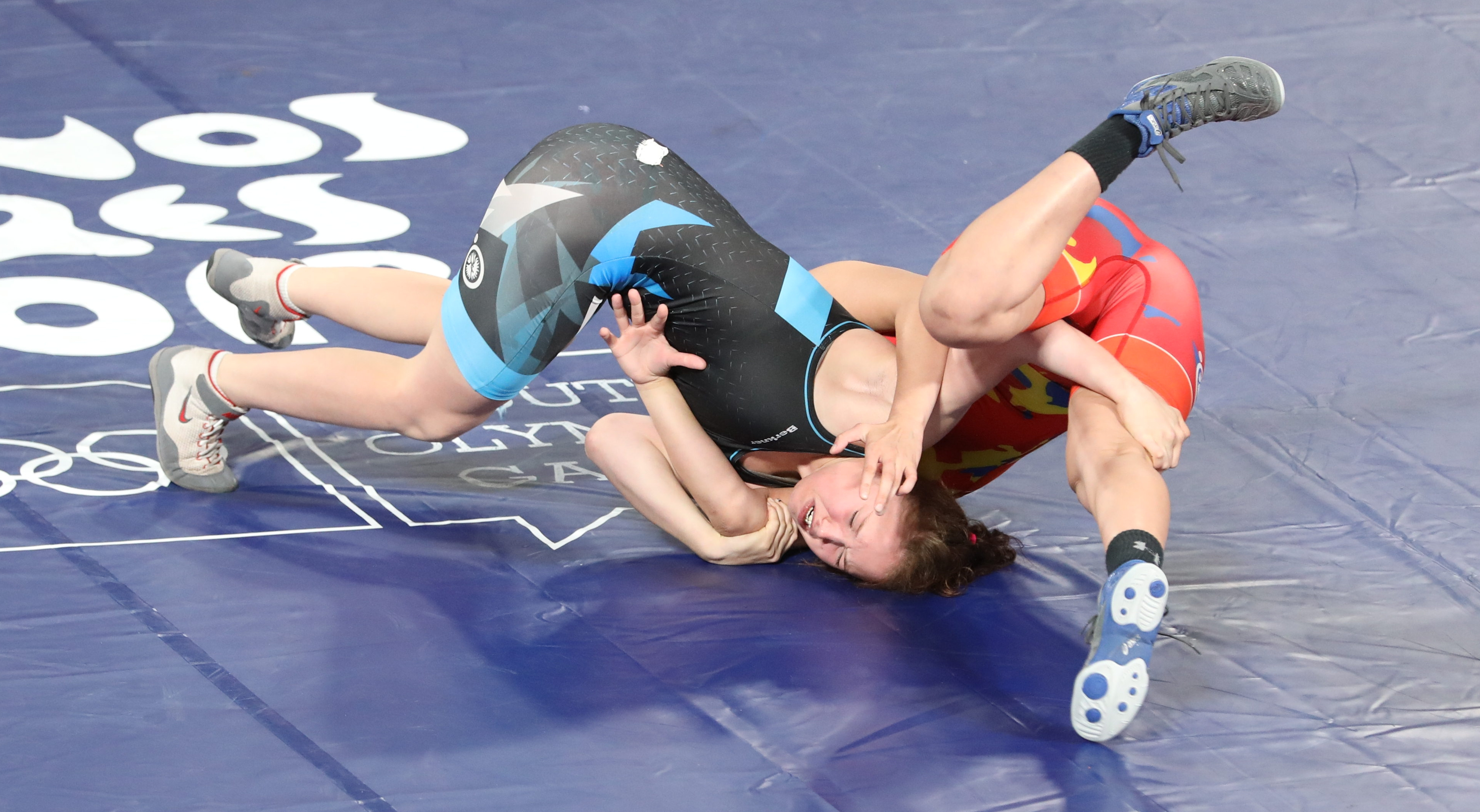
Classification 5th/6th Place

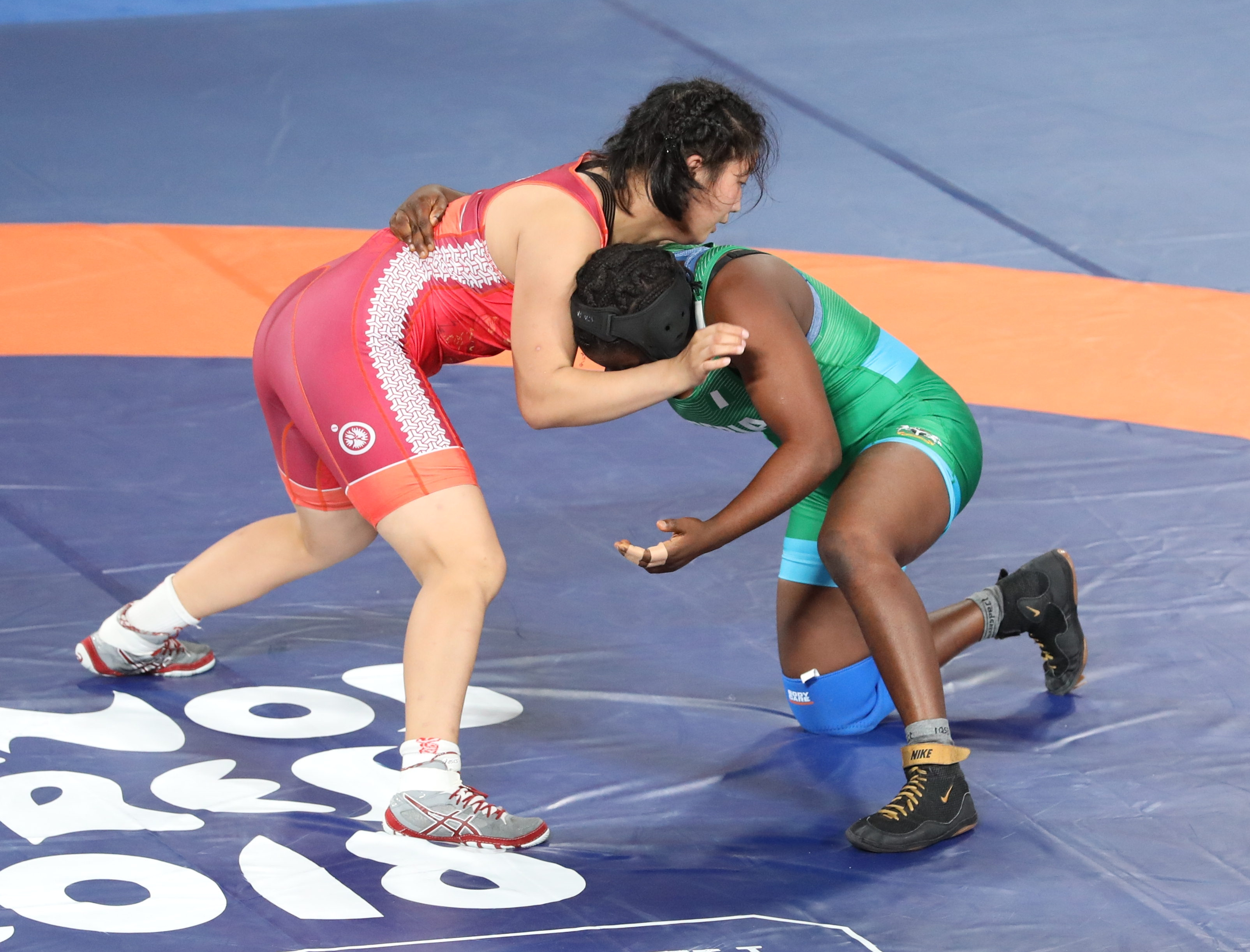
Bronze-medal match

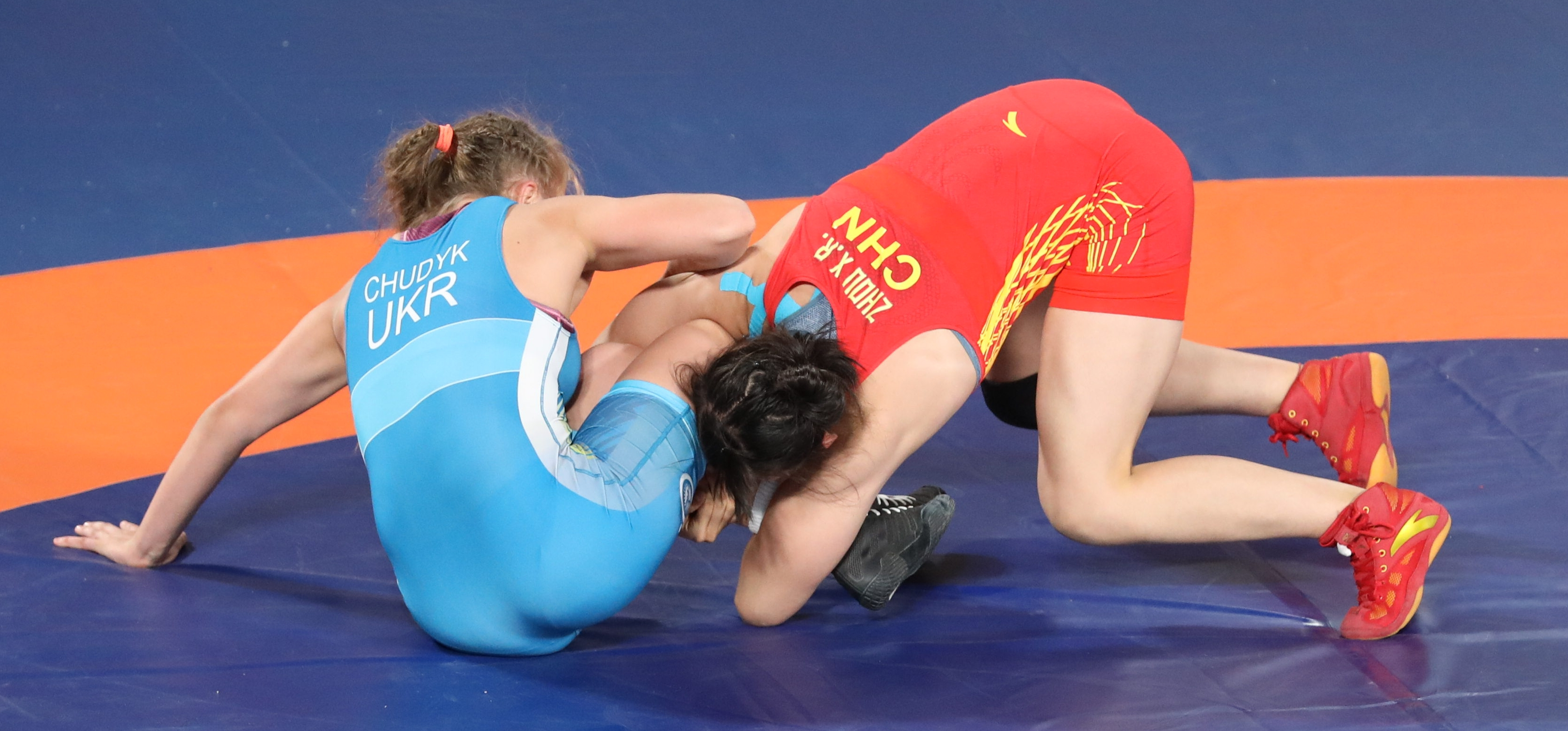
Gold-medal match

== Final rankings ==
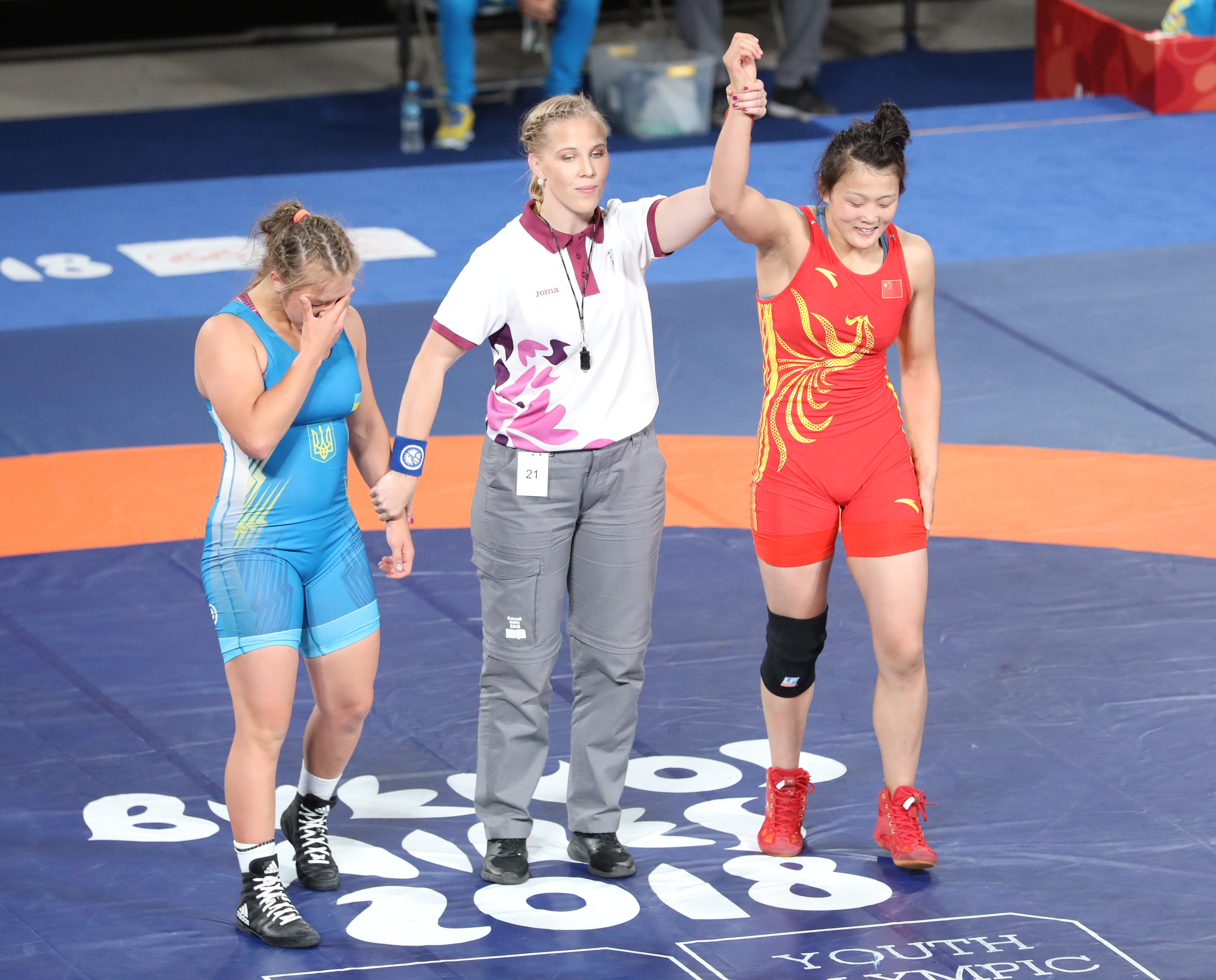
Zhou Xinru (Youth Olympic Games Champion) and Oksana Chudyk after the Gold-medal match

Rank	Athlete
1st place, gold medalist(s)	Zhou Xinru (CHN)
2nd place, silver medalist(s)	Oksana Chudyk (UKR)
3rd place, bronze medalist(s)	Oyun-Erdene Tamir (MGL)
4	Sunmisola Balogun (NGR)
5	Viktoria Vesso (EST)
6	Amina Capezan (ROU)
7	Zaineb Sghaier (TUN)
8	Yetzis Ramírez (CUB)
9	Sandra Escamilla (MEX)
–	Natacha Nabaina (CMR)
