= 2022 African Wrestling Championships =

- Host city: El Jadida, Morocco
- Dates: 17–22 May 2022

Champions
- Freestyle: Egypt
- Greco-Roman: Egypt
- Women: Tunisia

The 2022 African Wrestling Championships was a wrestling competition. The competition was originally scheduled to be held in El Jadida, Morocco, during 6–11 April 2021, then was postponed to 17–22 May 2022 at the same venue.

== Medals ==
=== Seniors ===
* Host nation (Morocco)

Rank	Nation	Gold	Silver	Bronze	Total
1	Egypt (EGY)	9	7	9	25
2	Algeria (ALG)	9	6	4	19
3	Nigeria (NGR)	4	3	4	11
4	Tunisia (TUN)	3	9	5	17
5	Guinea-Bissau (GNB)	2	0	1	3
6	Cameroon (CMR)	2	0	0	2
7	Senegal (SEN)	1	0	2	3
8	Morocco (MAR)*	0	3	7	10
9	South Africa (RSA)	0	1	3	4
10	Ivory Coast (CIV)	0	1	2	3
11	DR Congo (COD)	0	0	3	3
12	Congo (CGO)	0	0	1	1
12	Guinea (GUI)	0	0	1	1
12	Mauritius (MUS)	0	0	1	1
Totals (14 entries)		30	30	43	103

=== Juniors (U20) ===
* Host nation (Morocco)

Rank	Nation	Gold	Silver	Bronze	Total
1	Egypt (EGY)	16	6	3	25
2	Tunisia (TUN)	5	7	4	16
3	Algeria (ALG)	4	8	2	14
4	Morocco (MAR)*	4	3	6	13
5	Ivory Coast (CIV)	1	1	0	2
6	South Africa (RSA)	0	2	4	6
7	DR Congo (COD)	0	2	3	5
8	Senegal (SEN)	0	1	1	2
9	Angola (ANG)	0	0	1	1
9	Sudan (SUD)	0	0	1	1
Totals (10 entries)		30	30	25	85

=== Cadets (U17) ===
* Host nation (Morocco)

Rank	Nation	Gold	Silver	Bronze	Total
1	Egypt (EGY)	19	3	2	24
2	Tunisia (TUN)	4	4	6	14
3	Morocco (MAR)*	4	1	8	13
4	Algeria (ALG)	1	11	3	15
5	South Africa (RSA)	0	6	5	11
6	DR Congo (COD)	0	2	0	2
7	Ivory Coast (CIV)	0	1	0	1
Totals (7 entries)		28	28	24	80

== Team ranking ==
Rank	Men's freestyle		Men's Greco-Roman		Women's freestyle	
Rank	Team	Points	Team	Points	Team	Points
1	Egypt	195	Egypt	205	Tunisia	179
2	Algeria	178	Algeria	203	Nigeria	170
3	South Africa	93	Morocco	134	Egypt	110
4	Morocco	92	Tunisia	120	Cameroon	72
5	Tunisia	75	Democratic Republic of the Congo	90	Algeria	69
6	Guinea-Bissau	67	Kenya	54	Morocco	65
7	Democratic Republic of the Congo	64	South Africa	52	Ivory Coast	44
8	Nigeria	50	Namibia	34	Senegal	37
9	Kenya	47	Republic of the Congo	23	Kenya	25
10	Senegal	44	Angola	15	Republic of the Congo	24

== Medal summary ==
=== Men's freestyle ===
Event	Gold	Silver	Bronze
57 kg	Gamal Mohamed; Egypt	Ebikewenimo Welson; Nigeria	Omar Faye; Senegal
57 kg	Gamal Mohamed; Egypt	Ebikewenimo Welson; Nigeria	Diamantino Iuna Fafé; Guinea-Bissau
61 kg	Abdelhak Kherbache; Algeria	Shehabeldin Mohamed; Egypt	Sofiane El Khamer; Morocco
61 kg	Abdelhak Kherbache; Algeria	Shehabeldin Mohamed; Egypt	Didier Awene Diatta; Senegal
65 kg	Mbunde Cumba; Guinea-Bissau	Chouaib Sahraoui; Algeria	Yehia Hafez; Egypt
65 kg	Mbunde Cumba; Guinea-Bissau	Chouaib Sahraoui; Algeria	Otmane El Bahja; Morocco
70 kg	Bacar Ndum; Guinea-Bissau	Rami Brinis; Algeria	Mohamed Ali Zorgui; Tunisia
70 kg	Bacar Ndum; Guinea-Bissau	Rami Brinis; Algeria	Said El Gahsh; Egypt
74 kg	Amr Reda Hussen; Egypt	Abdelkader Ikkal; Algeria	Arno van Zijl; South Africa
74 kg	Amr Reda Hussen; Egypt	Abdelkader Ikkal; Algeria	Ogbonna John; Nigeria
79 kg	Chemseddine Fetairia; Algeria	Youssef Ait Boulahri; Morocco	Jean David Ste Marie; Mauritius
79 kg	Chemseddine Fetairia; Algeria	Youssef Ait Boulahri; Morocco	Andy Kabeya Mukendi; DR Congo
86 kg	Fateh Benferdjallah; Algeria	Mahmoud Badawi; Egypt	Ekerekeme Agiomor; Nigeria
86 kg	Fateh Benferdjallah; Algeria	Mahmoud Badawi; Egypt	Edward Louwing Lessing; South Africa
92 kg	Mohammed Fardj; Algeria	Imed Kaddidi; Tunisia	Machiel Grobler; South Africa
92 kg	Mohammed Fardj; Algeria	Imed Kaddidi; Tunisia	Noureldin Hassan; Egypt
97 kg	Mostafa Elders; Egypt	Nicolaas De Lange; South Africa	Ulrich Elyse Manouan; Ivory Coast
97 kg	Mostafa Elders; Egypt	Nicolaas De Lange; South Africa	Mohamed Saadaoui; Tunisia
125 kg	Youssif Hemida; Egypt	Anas Lamkabber; Morocco	Hamza Rahmani; Tunisia

=== Men's Greco-Roman ===
Event	Gold	Silver	Bronze
55 kg	Abdalla Mohamed Shaaban; Egypt	Mohamed Yacine Dridi; Algeria	Rabby Kilonga Kilandi; DR Congo
60 kg	Abdeldjebar Djebbari; Algeria	Ahmed Bagdouda; Egypt	Salim Hamdi; Tunisia
63 kg	Abdelkarim Fergat; Algeria	Moustafa Hussein Alameldin; Egypt	Fouad Fajari; Morocco
67 kg	Abdelrahman Ahmed Omar; Egypt	Ishak Ghaiou; Algeria	Bilal El Bahja; Morocco
72 kg	Mohamed Zahab Khalil; Egypt	Radhwen Tarhouni; Tunisia	Khalid Amaghdour; Morocco
72 kg	Mohamed Zahab Khalil; Egypt	Radhwen Tarhouni; Tunisia	Walid Ghaiou; Algeria
77 kg	Lamjed Maafi; Tunisia	Aziz Boualem; Morocco	Jean Claude Atongui; Congo
77 kg	Lamjed Maafi; Tunisia	Aziz Boualem; Morocco	Emad Ashraf Abouelatta; Egypt
82 kg	Abdelkrim Ouakali; Algeria	Hakim Trabelsi; Tunisia	Fares Mohamed Ghaly; Egypt
87 kg	Bachir Sid Azara; Algeria	Skander Missaoui; Tunisia	Noureldin Hassan; Egypt
87 kg	Bachir Sid Azara; Algeria	Skander Missaoui; Tunisia	Barthelemy Tshosha; DR Congo
97 kg	Adem Boudjemline; Algeria	Mohamed Ali Gabr; Egypt	Oussama Assaad; Morocco
130 kg	Abdellatif Mohamed; Egypt	Amine Guennichi; Tunisia	Hichem Kouchit; Algeria

=== Women's freestyle ===
Event	Gold	Silver	Bronze
50 kg	Sarra Hamdi; Tunisia	Nada Medani; Egypt	Ibtissem Doudou; Algeria
53 kg	Mercy Adekuoroye; Nigeria	Nogona Bakayoko; Ivory Coast	Shaimaa Atef Mohamed; Egypt
55 kg	Jumoke Adekoye; Nigeria	Faten Hammami; Tunisia	Louji Yassin; Egypt
57 kg	Joseph Essombe; Cameroon	Rayane Houfaf; Algeria	Farah Ali Hussein; Egypt
57 kg	Joseph Essombe; Cameroon	Rayane Houfaf; Algeria	Nisrine Hammas; Morocco
59 kg	Odunayo Adekuoroye; Nigeria	Siwar Bousetta; Tunisia	Fatoumata Camara; Guinea
62 kg	Marwa Amri; Tunisia	Patience Opuene; Nigeria	Mastoura Soudani; Algeria
65 kg	Berthe Etane Ngolle; Cameroon	Khadija Jlassi; Tunisia	Sunmisola Balogun; Nigeria
68 kg	Blessing Oborududu; Nigeria	Menatalla Badran; Egypt	Ranim Saidi; Tunisia
72 kg	Anta Sambou; Senegal	Zaineb Sghaier; Tunisia	Ebi Biogos; Nigeria
76 kg	Samar Amer; Egypt	Hannah Rueben; Nigeria	Amy Youin; Ivory Coast
