= Abdelmalek Merabet =

Algerian Greco-Roman wrestler

Personal information
- Born: 7 December 2000 (age 25)

Sport
- Country: Algeria
- Sport: Wrestling
- Weight class: 72 kg
- Event: Greco-Roman
Medal record
Men's Greco-Roman wrestling
Representing Algeria
African Championships
Silver medal – second place	2025 Casablanca	72 kg

Abdelmalek Merabet (Arabic: عبد المالك مرابط; born 7 December 2000) is an Algerian Greco-Roman wrestler. He competed for Algeria at the 2020 Summer Olympics in the men's Greco-Roman 67 kg event.
