= Nogona Bakayoko =

Ivorian female freestyle wrestler

Personal information
- Full name: Nogona Celine Josee Bakayoko
- Born: 28 September 1992 (age 34)

Sport
- Country: Côte d'Ivoire
- Sport: Wrestling
- Weight class: 53 kg
- Event: Freestyle wrestling
Medal record
Women's freestyle wrestling
Representing Ivory Coast
African Games
Silver medal – second place	Accra 2023	53 kg

Nogona Bakayoko (born 28 September 1992) is an Ivorian freestyle wrestler. She won the silver medal at the 2023 African Games and is a multiple medalist at the African Wrestling Championships.
