= African Wrestling Championships =

African wrestling competition

- Status: Active
- Genre: Sports Event
- Date: February – May
- Frequency: Annual
- Location: Various
- Inaugurated: 1969
- Major events: Amateur Wrestling
- Organiser: FILA → UWW Africa

The African Wrestling Championships are amateur wrestling championships. Events are held in men's freestyle wrestling, men's Greco-Roman wrestling and women's freestyle wrestling. In 1996 a tournament for women was held for the first time.

== Editions ==
Not held in 1970, 1972–1980, 1983, 1986–1987, 1991, 1995, 1999, 2021.

Edition	Year	Host city	Host country	Events
1	1969	Casablanca	Morocco	10
2	1971	Alexandria	Egypt	10
3	1981	Nabeul	Tunisia	20
4	1982	Casablanca	Morocco	20
5	1984	Alexandria	Egypt	20
6	1985	Casablanca	Morocco	20
7	1988	Tunis	Tunisia	20
8	1989	Cairo	Egypt	20
9	1990	Casablanca	Morocco	20
10	1992	Safi	Morocco	20
11	1993	Pretoria	South Africa	20
12	1994	Cairo	Egypt	20
13	1996	El Menzah	Tunisia	29
14	1997	Casablanca	Morocco	22
15	1998	Cairo	Egypt	22
16	2000	Tunis	Tunisia	22
17	2001	El Jadida	Morocco	22
18	2002	Cairo	Egypt	21
19	2003	Cairo	Egypt	21
20	2004	Cairo	Egypt	21
21	2005	Casablanca	Morocco	21
22	2006	Pretoria	South Africa	21
23	2007	Cairo	Egypt	20
24	2008	Tunis	Tunisia	21
25	2009	Casablanca	Morocco	21
26	2010	Cairo	Egypt	21
27	2011	Dakar	Senegal	21
28	2012	Marrakesh	Morocco	21
29	2013	N'Djamena	Chad	21
30	2014	Tunis	Tunisia	24
31	2015	Alexandria	Egypt	24
32	2016	Alexandria	Egypt	24
33	2017	Marrakesh	Morocco	24
34	2018	Port Harcourt	Nigeria	30
35	2019	Hammamet	Tunisia	30
36	2020	Algiers	Algeria	30
37	2022	El Jadida	Morocco	30
38	2023	Tunis	Tunisia	30
39	2024	Alexandria	Egypt	24
40	2025	Casablanca	Morocco	
41	2026	Alexandria	Egypt	

== Medals (1969–2026) ==
Rank	NOC	Gold	Silver	Bronze	Total
1	Egypt	366	186	144	696
2	Tunisia	161	192	194	547
3	Nigeria	155	76	73	304
4	Algeria	83	173	145	401
5	Senegal	47	57	77	181
6	Morocco	41	99	141	281
7	South Africa	31	71	110	212
8	Guinea-Bissau	18	7	17	42
9	Cameroon	15	29	39	83
10	Ivory Coast	2	12	12	26
11	Niger	2	3	1	6
12	DR Congo	1	2	21	24
13	Kenya	1	1	4	6
14	Libya	1	0	6	7
15	Madagascar	0	6	8	14
16	Namibia	0	3	17	20
17	Guinea	0	3	6	9
17	Sierra Leone	0	3	6	9
19	Mauritius	0	2	9	11
20	Chad	0	1	13	14
21	Angola	0	1	12	13
22	Central African Republic	0	1	3	4
22	Mauritania	0	1	3	4
24	Burkina Faso	0	1	2	3
25	Congo	0	0	7	7
26	Cape Verde	0	0	5	5
27	Ghana	0	0	3	3
28	Comoros	0	0	2	2
28	Sudan	0	0	2	2
30	Benin	0	0	1	1
30	Liberia	0	0	1	1
Totals (31 entries)		924	930	1,084	2,938

== U23 ==
Edition	Year	Host city	Host country	Events
1	2018	Alexandria	Egypt	30
2	2019	Alexandria	Egypt	30

== Juniors (U20) ==
N°	Année	Ville	Pays	Dates
01	2006	Algiers	Algeria	mai 2006
02	2007	Tunis	Tunisia	mai 2007
03	2008	Tunis	Tunisia	7–8 mars 2008
04	2009	Tipaza	Algeria	15–17 mai 2009
05	2010	Cairo	Egypt	26–29 juin 2010
06	2011	Staoueli	Algeria	29–31 mai 2011
07	2012	Antananarivo	Madagascar	12–14 mars 2012
08	2013	N'Djamena	Chad	30 avril – 5 mai 2013
09	2014	Alexandrie	Egypt	28–30 mars 2014
10	2015	Alexandrie	Egypt	mai 2015
11	2016	Algiers	Algeria	4–6 mars 2016
12	2017	Marrakesh	Morocco	26–30 avril 2017
13	2018	Port Harcourt	Nigeria	7–11 avril 2018
14	2019	Hammamet	Tunisia	26–31 mars 2019
15	2020	Algiers	Algeria	4–9 février 2020
16	2022	El Jadida	Morocco	17–22 May 2022
17	2023	Tunis	Tunisia	16–21 May 2023
18	2024	Alexandrie	Egypt	14–19 mars 2024

== Cadets (U17) ==
	2020-02-04 	  	African Championship 	  	Algiers (ALG) 	  	Cadets 	  	LL 	 
 	2020-02-04 	  	African Championship 	  	Algiers (ALG) 	  	Cadets 	  	LF 	 
 	2020-02-04 	  	African Championship 	  	Algiers (ALG) 	  	Cadets 	  	GR 	 
 	2019-03-26 	  	African Championship 	  	Hammamet (TUN) 	  	Cadets 	  	GR 	 
 	2019-03-26 	  	African Championship 	  	Hammamet (TUN) 	  	Cadets 	  	LL 	 
 	2019-03-26 	  	African Championship 	  	Hammamet (TUN) 	  	Cadets 	  	LF 	 
 	2018-02-07 	  	African Championship 	  	Port Harcourt (NGR) 	  	Cadets 	  	LF 	 
 	2018-02-07 	  	African Championship 	  	Port Harcourt (NGR) 	  	Cadets 	  	LL 	 
 	2018-02-07 	  	African Championship 	  	Port Harcourt (NGR) 	  	Cadets 	  	GR 	 
 	2017-04-27 	  	African Championship 	  	Marrakesh (MAR) 	  	Cadets 	  	LL 	 
 	2017-04-26 	  	African Championship 	  	Marrakesh (MAR) 	  	Cadets 	  	LF 	 
 	2017-04-26 	  	African Championship 	  	Marrakesh (MAR) 	  	Cadets 	  	GR 	 
 	2016-06-15 	  	African Championship 	  	Algiers (ALG) 	  	Cadets 	  	LL 	 
 	2016-06-15 	  	African Championship 	  	Algiers (ALG) 	  	Cadets 	  	LF 	 
 	2016-06-15 	  	African Championship 	  	Algiers (ALG) 	  	Cadets 	  	GR 	 
 	2015-05-27 	  	African Championship 	  	Alexandria (EGY) 	  	Cadets 	  	LF 	 
 	2015-05-27 	  	African Championship 	  	Alexandria (EGY) 	  	Cadets 	  	GR 	 
 	2015-05-27 	  	African Championship 	  	Alexandria (EGY) 	  	Cadets 	  	LL 	 
 	2014-05-19 	  	African Championship 	  	Alexandria (EGY) 	  	Cadets 	  	GR 	 
 	2014-05-19 	  	African Championship 	  	Alexandria (EGY) 	  	Cadets 	  	LF 	 
 	2014-05-19 	  	African Championship 	  	Alexandria (EGY) 	  	Cadets 	  	LL 	 
 	2012-06-14 	  	African Championship 	  	Antananarivo (MAD) 	  	Cadets 	  	LF 	 
 	2012-06-14 	  	African Championship 	  	Antananarivo (MAD) 	  	Cadets 	  	GR 	 
 	2012-06-14 	  	African Championship 	  	Antananarivo (MAD) 	  	Cadets 	  	LL 	 
 	2011-07-07 	  	African Championship 	  	Algiers - Staouali (ALG) 	Cadets 	  	GR 	 
 	2011-07-07 	  	African Championship 	  	Algiers - Staouali (ALG) 	Cadets 	  	LL 	 
 	2011-07-07 	  	African Championship 	  	Algiers - Staouali (ALG)   	Cadets 	  	LF 	 
 	2010-04-23 	  	African Championship 	  	Cairo (EGY) 	  	Cadets 	  	LL 	 
 	2010-04-22 	  	African Championship 	  	Cairo (EGY) 	  	Cadets 	  	GR 	 
 	2010-04-22 	  	African Championship 	  	Cairo (EGY) 	  	Cadets 	  	LF 	 
 	2009-07-05 	  	African Championship 	  	Tipaza (ALG) 	  	Cadets 	  	GR 	 
 	2009-07-05 	  	African Championship 	  	Tipaza (ALG) 	  	Cadets 	  	LF 	 
 	2009-07-05 	  	African Championship 	  	Tipaza (ALG) 	  	Cadets 	  	LL

== See also ==
- Wrestling at the African Games
