= Wrestling at the 2026 Asian Games – Men's Greco-Roman 77 kg =

Men's Greco-Roman 77 kg at the 2026 Asian Games
- Venue: Inae Sports Center
- Date: 1 October 2026
- Competitors: 14 from 14 nations

Medalists
gold medal	Alireza Abdevali	Iran
silver medal	Nao Kusaka	Japan
bronze medal	Akzhol Makhmudov	Kyrgyzstan
bronze medal	Shahin Badaghi	Qatar

The men's 77 kilograms Greco-Roman wrestling competition at the 2026 Asian Games was held on 1 October 2026 at the Inae Sports Center in Nagoya. The event was competed by 14 competitors. Alireza Abdevali of Iran won the gold medal after defeating Nao Kusaka of Japan in the final. Akzhol Makhmudov of Kyrgyzstan and Shahin Badaghi of Qatar won the bronze medals.

== Background ==
Men's Greco-Roman wrestling was first contested at the 1962 Asian Games in Jakarta. It has been contested at several editions of the Asian Games since then.

Kyrgyzstan's Akzhol Makhmudov was the defending champion, having won the gold medal in the men's Greco-Roman 77 kg event at the 2022 Asian Games in Hangzhou. Amin Kavianinejad of Iran won the silver medal while Kazakhstan's Azat Sadykov and China's Liu Rui won the bronze medals. Makhmudov and Liu returned to compete in the 2026 edition.

Makhmudov was the silver medalist at the 2020 Summer Olympics in Tokyo and won the gold medal at the 2022 World Wrestling Championships, becoming the first male wrestler from Kyrgyzstan to win a senior world title. He had also won the Asian Wrestling Championships four times, in 2018, 2022, 2023, and 2026. In the 2024 Asian Wrestling Championships, he lost to Japan's Nao Kusaka. Kusaka was the reigning Olympic champion, having won the gold medal in the Greco-Roman 77 kg category at the 2024 Summer Olympics. He also won the silver medal at the 2025 World Wrestling Championships.

Kazakhstan's Demeu Zhadrayev was the silver medalist in the 77 kg category at the 2017 World Wrestling Championships. He subsequently won the silver medal at the 2024 Summer Olympics, losing to Japan's Kusaka in the final. Iran's Alireza Abdevali is a two time World Under-20 champion in the 77 kg category. He had also won the silver medal at the 2025 Asian Wrestling Championships and finished fifth at the 2025 World Wrestling Championships. India was represented by Aman Baroniya, who had reached the semifinals of the 2026 Asian Wrestling Championships.

== Format ==
The Greco-Roman wrestling competition was competed as a single-elimination tournament. The two finalists competed against each other for the gold and silver medals. Each wrestler who loses to one of the two finalists moves into the repechage rounds, which is used to determine the bronze medals. The losers of the semifinals compete against the remaining repechage opponent from their half of the bracket in the bronze medal bout.

== Schedule ==
The men's Greco-Roman 77 kg event was held on 30 September 2026 held at the Inae Sports Center in Nagoya.

All times are Japan Standard Time (UTC+09:00)

Date	Time	Event
Thursday, 1 October 2026	10:30	1/8 finals
Thursday, 1 October 2026	10:30	1/4 finals
Thursday, 1 October 2026	10:30	Semifinals
Thursday, 1 October 2026	10:30	Repechages
Thursday, 1 October 2026	18:00	Finals

== Summary ==
The event was competed by 14 competitors. Abdevali won his first two rounds by technical superiority to reach the semifinals. He defeated Shahin Badaghi in the semifinals by a scoreline of 9–0, to set up a clash with Kusaka in the final. Kusaka reached the final after defeating Makhmudov by fall in the opening round and Zhadrayev in the quarterfinals. In the quarterfinals, Kusaka trailed 4-9 going into the final minute of the second period. He then scored seven consecutive points to stage a comeback and win the bout. In the semifinals, Kusaka defeated China's Liu Rui 9–0 by technical superiority to advance to the final.

In the final, Abdevali initially took a two point lead with a takedown in the first period. In the second period, Abdevali scored a point and Kusaka scored three points through step outs to level the score at 3–3. Abdevali subsequently defended against Kusaka's attacks and forced him to step out twice more to secure two additional points to win the bout by a 5–3 scoreline to win the gold medal.

Makhmudov and Badaghi won the two bronze medals. Makhmudov defeated Liu Rui 9–0 by technical superiority in his bronze-medal bout, scoring two four-point throws to complete the victory in one minute and 27 seconds. Badaghi defeated Indonesia's Andika Sulaeman 8–0 by technical superiority to claim the other bronze medal. Makhmudov had earlier defeated Zhadrayev 10–1 in the repechage rounds to advance to the bronze-medal bout.

== Results ==
Legend

- F — Won by fall

=== Main bracket ===
1/8 finals
Akzhol Makhmudov (KGZ)	0
Nao Kusaka (JPN)	4^{F}
Abdullo Aliev (UZB)	1
Noh Yeong-hun (KOR)	2
Nguyễn Công Mạnh (VIE)	0
Liu Rui (CHN)	8
Shahin Badaghi (QAT)	8
Alisher Ruzimadov (TJK)	0
Aman Baroniya (IND)	8
Tüvshinbaataryn Borgil (MGL)	6
Andika Sulaeman (INA)	9
Jason Baucas (PHI)	0

1/4 finals
Demeu Zhadrayev (KAZ)	9
Nao Kusaka (JPN)	11
Noh Yeong-hun (KOR)	0
Liu Rui (CHN)	10
Shahin Badaghi (QAT)	9
Aman Baroniya (IND)	0
Andika Sulaeman (INA)	0
Alireza Abdevali (IRI)	8

Semifinals
Nao Kusaka (JPN)	9
Liu Rui (CHN)	0
Shahin Badaghi (QAT)	0
Alireza Abdevali (IRI)	9

Final
Nao Kusaka (JPN)	3
Alireza Abdevali (IRI)	5

=== Repechage ===
Repechage
Akzhol Makhmudov (KGZ)	10
Demeu Zhadrayev (KAZ)	1

Bronze medal matches
Akzhol Makhmudov (KGZ)	9
Liu Rui (CHN)	0
Andika Sulaeman (INA)	0
Shahin Badaghi (QAT)	8

== Final standing ==
Rank	Athlete
1st place, gold medalist(s)	Alireza Abdevali (IRI)
2nd place, silver medalist(s)	Nao Kusaka (JPN)
3rd place, bronze medalist(s)	Akzhol Makhmudov (KGZ)
3rd place, bronze medalist(s)	Shahin Badaghi (QAT)
5	Liu Rui (CHN)
5	Andika Sulaeman (INA)
7	Aman Baroniya (IND)
8	Noh Yeong-hun (KOR)
9	Demeu Zhadrayev (KAZ)
10	Tüvshinbaataryn Borgil (MGL)
11	Abdullo Aliev (UZB)
12	Nguyễn Công Mạnh (VIE)
13	Alisher Ruzimadov (TJK)
14	Jason Baucas (PHI)
