= 2023 World Wrestling Championships – Men's Greco-Roman 77 kg =

Wrestling competitions

Men's Greco-Roman 77 kg at the 2023 World Championships
- Venue: Štark Arena
- Dates: 21–22 September 2023
- Competitors: 45 from 42 nations

Medalists
| gold medal | Akzhol Makhmudov | Kyrgyzstan |
| silver medal | Sanan Suleymanov | Azerbaijan |
| bronze medal | Malkhas Amoyan | Armenia |
| bronze medal | Nao Kusaka | Japan |

The men's Greco-Roman 77 kilograms is a competition featured at the 2023 World Wrestling Championships, and was held in Belgrade, Serbia on 21 and 22 September 2023.

This freestyle wrestling competition consists of a single-elimination tournament, with a repechage used to determine the winner of two bronze medals. The two finalists face off for gold and silver medals. Each wrestler who loses to one of the two finalists moves into the repechage, culminating in a pair of bronze medal matches featuring the semifinal losers each facing the remaining repechage opponent from their half of the bracket.

== Results ==
Legend

- F — Won by fall

=== Finals ===
| Semifinals | | Final |
| Sanan Suleymanov (AZE) | 5 |
| Malkhas Amoyan (ARM) | 0 | Sanan Suleymanov (AZE) | 1 |
| Akzhol Makhmudov (KGZ) | 7 | Akzhol Makhmudov (KGZ) | 1 |
| Nao Kusaka (JPN) | 5 |

=== Top half ===
==== Section 1 ====
Round of 64
Antonio Kamenjašević (CRO) | 0
Demeu Zhadrayev (KAZ) | 5
Fabio Dietsche (SUI) | 1
Kamal Bey (USA) | 4
Jonni Sarkkinen (FIN) | 1
Sanan Suleymanov (AZE) | 5

Round of 32
Zoltán Lévai (HUN) | 4^{F}
Gurpreet Singh (UWW) | 0
Toýly Orazow (TKM) | 0
Demeu Zhadrayev (KAZ) | 9
Kamal Bey (USA) | 0
Sanan Suleymanov (AZE) | 8
Albin Olofsson (SWE) | 3
Alexandrin Guțu (MDA) | 9

Round of 16
Zoltán Lévai (HUN) | 1
Demeu Zhadrayev (KAZ) | 4
Sanan Suleymanov (AZE) | 3
Alexandrin Guțu (MDA) | 1

Quarterfinals
Demeu Zhadrayev (KAZ) | 1
Sanan Suleymanov (AZE) | 5

==== Section 2 ====
Round of 64
Luca Dariozzi (ITA) | 2
Kevin Kupi (ALB) | 6
Dmytro Vasetskyi (UKR) | 1
Yosvanys Peña (CUB) | 3
Abdelkrim Ouakali (ALG) | 2
Park Dae-kun (KOR) | 3
Johnny Bur (FRA) | 6
Joílson Júnior (BRA) | 2

Round of 32
Viktor Nemeš (SRB) | 7
Jair Cuero (COL) | 0
Kevin Kupi (ALB) | 0
Yosvanys Peña (CUB) | 8
Park Dae-kun (KOR) | 0
Johnny Bur (FRA) | 3
Paulius Galkinas (LTU) | 0
Malkhas Amoyan (ARM) | 9

Round of 16
Viktor Nemeš (SRB) | 1
Yosvanys Peña (CUB) | 1
Johnny Bur (FRA) | 1
Malkhas Amoyan (ARM) | 9

Quarterfinals
Viktor Nemeš (SRB) | 1
Malkhas Amoyan (ARM) | 3

=== Bottom half ===
==== Section 3 ====
Round of 64
Deni Nakaev (GER) | 6
Oliver Krüger (DEN) | 1
Aram Vardanyan (UZB) | 9
Francisco Kadima (ANG) | 0
Amro Sadeh (JOR) | 1
Bahejiang Halishan (CHN) | 11

Round of 32
Akzhol Makhmudov (KGZ) | 4^{F}
Per-Anders Kure (NOR) | 3
Mohamed Ehab Khalil (EGY) | 6
Deni Nakaev (GER) | 1
Aram Vardanyan (UZB) | 5
Bahejiang Halishan (CHN) | 1
Emmanuel Benítez (MEX) | 1
Aik Mnatsakanian (BUL) | 3

Round of 16
Akzhol Makhmudov (KGZ) | 9
Mohamed Ehab Khalil (EGY) | 0
Aram Vardanyan (UZB) | 2
Aik Mnatsakanian (BUL) | 2

Quarterfinals
Akzhol Makhmudov (KGZ) | 6
Aram Vardanyan (UZB) | 0

==== Section 4 ====
Round of 64
Wuileixis Rivas (VEN) | 6
Marcos Sánchez-Silva (ESP) | 1
Oldřich Varga (CZE) | 2
Patryk Bednarz (POL) | 6
Mohammad Ali Geraei (IRI) | 2
Adlet Tiuliubaev (AIN) | 0

Round of 32
Iuri Lomadze (GEO) | 7
Pavel Liakh (AIN) | 2
Wuileixis Rivas (VEN) | 4
Patryk Bednarz (POL) | 4
Mohammad Ali Geraei (IRI) | 5
Nao Kusaka (JPN) | 5
Georgios Prevolarakis (GRE) | 5
Yunus Emre Başar (TUR) | 3

Round of 16
Iuri Lomadze (GEO) | 10
Patryk Bednarz (POL) | 1
Nao Kusaka (JPN) | 4
Georgios Prevolarakis (GRE) | 0

Quarterfinals
Iuri Lomadze (GEO) | 0
Nao Kusaka (JPN) | 10

=== Repechage ===
Repechage round 1
Jonni Sarkkinen (FIN) | 3
Kamal Bey (USA) | 7

Repechage round 2
Kamal Bey (USA) | 3
Alexandrin Guțu (MDA) | 3
Per-Anders Kure (NOR) | 2
Mohamed Ehab Khalil (EGY) | 4

Repechage round 3
Alexandrin Guțu (MDA) | 2
Demeu Zhadrayev (KAZ) | 7
Mohamed Ehab Khalil (EGY) | 0
Aram Vardanyan (UZB) | 8

Bronze medals
Demeu Zhadrayev (KAZ) | 7
Malkhas Amoyan (ARM) | 9
Aram Vardanyan (UZB) | 0
Nao Kusaka (JPN) | 8

| Olympic wrestle-off |
| Demeu Zhadrayev (KAZ) | 4 |
| Aram Vardanyan (UZB) | 5 |

== Final standing ==
| Rank | Athlete |
|---|---|
| 1st place, gold medalist(s) | Akzhol Makhmudov (KGZ) |
| 2nd place, silver medalist(s) | Sanan Suleymanov (AZE) |
| 3rd place, bronze medalist(s) | Malkhas Amoyan (ARM) |
| 3rd place, bronze medalist(s) | Nao Kusaka (JPN) |
| 5 | Aram Vardanyan (UZB) |
| 5 | Demeu Zhadrayev (KAZ) |
| 7 | Yosvanys Peña (CUB) |
| 8 | Alexandrin Guțu (MDA) |
| 9 | Iuri Lomadze (GEO) |
| 10 | Kamal Bey (USA) |
| 11 | Patryk Bednarz (POL) |
| 12 | Johnny Bur (FRA) |
| 13 | Viktor Nemeš (SRB) |
| 14 | Zoltán Lévai (HUN) |
| 15 | Mohamed Ehab Khalil (EGY) |
| 16 | Bahejiang Halishan (CHN) |
| 17 | Wuileixis Rivas (VEN) |
| 18 | Mohammad Ali Geraei (IRI) |
| 19 | Deni Nakaev (GER) |
| 20 | Aik Mnatsakanian (BUL) |
| 21 | Kevin Kupi (ALB) |
| 22 | Georgios Prevolarakis (GRE) |
| 23 | Park Dae-kun (KOR) |
| 24 | Jonni Sarkkinen (FIN) |
| 25 | Per-Anders Kure (NOR) |
| 26 | Yunus Emre Başar (TUR) |
| 27 | Albin Olofsson (SWE) |
| 28 | Abdelkrim Ouakali (ALG) |
| 29 | Luca Dariozzi (ITA) |
| 30 | Joílson Júnior (BRA) |
| 31 | Oldřich Varga (CZE) |
| 32 | Pavel Liakh (AIN) |
| 33 | Dmytro Vasetskyi (UKR) |
| 34 | Emmanuel Benítez (MEX) |
| 35 | Fabio Dietsche (SUI) |
| 36 | Oliver Krüger (DEN) |
| 37 | Marcos Sánchez-Silva (ESP) |
| 38 | Amro Sadeh (JOR) |
| 39 | Adlet Tiuliubaev (AIN) |
| 40 | Gurpreet Singh (UWW) |
| 41 | Antonio Kamenjašević (CRO) |
| 42 | Jair Cuero (COL) |
| 43 | Toýly Orazow (TKM) |
| 44 | Paulius Galkinas (LTU) |
| 45 | Francisco Kadima (ANG) |

| Qualified for the 2024 Summer Olympics |
