= Kyrgyzstan at the 2024 Summer Olympics =

- IOC code: KGZ
- NOC: National Olympic Committee of the Kyrgyz Republic
- Website: olympic.kg (in Kyrgyz and English)

in Paris, France 26 July 2024 – 11 August 2024
- Competitors: 16 in 5 sports
- Flag bearers: Erlan Sherov; Elizaveta Pecherskikh
- Medals Ranked 68th: Gold 0 Silver 2 Bronze 4 Total 6

Summer Olympics appearances (overview)
- 1996; 2000; 2004; 2008; 2012; 2016; 2020; 2024

Other related appearances
- Russian Empire (1900–1912); Soviet Union (1952–1988); Unified Team (1992)

Kyrgyzstan competed at the 2024 Summer Olympics in Paris from 26 July to 11 August 2024. It was the nation's eighth consecutive appearance at the Summer Olympics in the post-Soviet era.

== Medalists ==
Medal	Name	Sport	Event	Date
Silver	Meerim Zhumanazarova	Wrestling	Woman's Freestyle –68 kg	6 August
Silver	Munarbek Seiitbek Uulu	Boxing	Men's 57 kg	10 August
Bronze	Zholaman Sharshenbekov	Wrestling	Men's Greco-Roman –60 kg	6 August
Bronze	Akzhol Makhmudov	Wrestling	Men's Greco-Roman –77 kg	7 August
Bronze	Uzur Dzhuzupbekov	Wrestling	Men's Greco-Roman –97 kg	7 August
Bronze	Aisuluu Tynybekova	Wrestling	Women's Freestyle –62 kg	10 August

== Competitors ==
The following is the list of number of competitors in the Games.

Sport	Men	Women	Total
Athletics	0	1	1
Boxing	1	0	1
Judo	2	0	2
Swimming	1	1	2
Wrestling	7	3	10
Total	11	5	16

== Athletics ==
Kyrgyzstani track and field athletes qualified for Paris 2024, by receiving the direct universality spots in the following event:

Key

- Note–Ranks given for track events are within the athlete's heat only
- Q = Qualified for the next round
- q = Qualified for the next round as a fastest loser or, in field events, by position without achieving the qualifying target
- NR = National record
- N/A = Round not applicable for the event
- Bye = Athlete not required to compete in round

Track and road events

Athlete	Event	Final	
Athlete	Event	Result	Rank
Sardana Trofimova	Women's marathon	2:26:47 NR	13

== Boxing ==
For the first time since 2016, Kyrgyzstan entered one boxer into the Olympic tournament. Munarbek Seiitbek Uulu (men's featherweight) secured his spot following the triumph in quota bouts round, at the 2024 World Olympic Qualification Tournament 2 in Bangkok, Thailand.

Athlete	Event	Round of 32	Round of 16	Quarterfinals	Semifinals	Final	
Athlete	Event	Opposition Result	Opposition Result	Opposition Result	Opposition Result	Opposition Result	Rank
Munarbek Seiitbek Uulu	Men's 57 kg	—	Horta (CUB); W 3–2	Harvey (USA); W 3–2	Javier Ibáñez (BUL); W 4–1	Abdumalik Khalokov (UZB); L 0–5	2nd place, silver medalist(s)

== Judo ==
Kyrgyzstan qualified two judokas for the following weight classes at the Games. Kubanychbek Aibek Uulu (men's half-lightweight, 66 kg) and Erlan Sherov (men's middleweight, 90 kg) got qualified via quota based on IJF World Ranking List and continental quota based on Olympic point rankings.

Athlete	Event	Round of 64	Round of 32	Round of 16	Quarterfinals	Semifinals	Repechage	Final / BM	
Athlete	Event	Opposition Result	Opposition Result	Opposition Result	Opposition Result	Opposition Result	Opposition Result	Opposition Result	Rank
Kubanychbek Aibek Uulu	Men's −66 kg	—	Iadov (UKR); L 0–11	Did not advance					
Erlan Sherov	Men's –90 kg	—	Morales (CUB); W 10–00	Mosakhlishvili (ESP); L 00–10	Did not advance				

== Swimming ==
Kyrgyzstan swimmers achieved the entry standards in the following events for Paris 2024 (a maximum of two swimmers under the Olympic Qualifying Time (OQT) and potentially at the Olympic Consideration Time (OCT))

Athlete	Event	Heat		Semifinal		Final	
Athlete	Event	Time	Rank	Time	Rank	Time	Rank
Denis Petrashov	Men's 100 m breaststroke	1:00.42	23	Did not advance			
Denis Petrashov	Men's 200 m breaststroke	2:10.99	16 Q	2:10.19	14	Did not advance	
Elizaveta Pecherskikh	Women's 50 m freestyle	26.26	30	Did not advance			

Qualifiers for the latter rounds (Q) of all events were decided on a time only basis, therefore positions shown are overall results versus competitors in all heats.

== Wrestling ==
Kyrgyzstan qualified ten wrestlers for the following classes into the Olympic competition. Four of them qualified for the games by virtue of their top five finish at the 2023 World Championships in Belgrade, Serbia; four wrestlers qualified for the games by winning the semifinal round at the 2024 Asian Olympic Qualification Tournament in Bishkek; and two wrestlers qualified for the games through the 2024 World Qualification Tournament in Istanbul, Turkey.

Key:

- VT (ranking points: 5–0 or 0–5) – Victory by fall.
- VB (ranking points: 5–0 or 0–5) – Victory by injury (VF for forfeit, VA for withdrawal or disqualification)
- PP (ranking points: 3–1 or 1–3) – Decision by points – the loser with technical points.
- PO (ranking points: 3–0 or 0–3) – Decision by points – the loser without technical points.
- ST (ranking points: 4–0 or 0–4) – Great superiority – the loser without technical points and a margin of victory of at least 8 (Greco-Roman) or 10 (freestyle) points.
- SP (ranking points: 4–1 or 1–4) – Technical superiority – the loser with technical points and a margin of victory of at least 8 (Greco-Roman) or 10 (freestyle) points.

Freestyle

Athlete	Event	Round of 16	Quarterfinal	Semifinal	Repechage	Final / BM	
Athlete	Event	Opposition Result	Opposition Result	Opposition Result	Opposition Result	Opposition Result	Rank
Bekzat Almaz Uulu	Men's −57 kg	Kartbay (KAZ); W 4–1 ^{SP}	Lee (USA); L 2–12	—	Wanhao (CHN); W 7^{F} – 4	Abdullaev (UZB) L 1–5	5
Ernazar Akmataliev	Men's −65 kg	Musukaev (HUN); L 0–11	Did not advance				
Aiaal Lazarev	Men's −125 kg	Zare (IRI); L 0–5	Did not advance		Amar Dhesi (CAN); W 5–0	Taha Akgül (TUR); L 0–7	5
Aisuluu Tynybekova	Women's −62 kg	Kolawole (NGR); W 5–1	Miracle (USA); W 6–6	Koliadenko (UKR); L 2–9	Bye	Pürevdorjiin Orkhon (MGL); W 6*–6	3rd place, bronze medalist(s)
Meerim Zhumanazarova	Women's −68 kg	Delgermaa (MGL); W 8–3 ^{PP}	Ozaki (JPN); W 8–6 ^{PP}	Oborududu (NGR); W 3–1 ^{PP}	—	Elor (USA); L 3–0	2nd place, silver medalist(s)
Aiperi Medet Kyzy	Women's −76 kg	Juan (CHN); W 4–1 ^{PP}	Hooda (IND); W 1–1 ^{PP}	Blades (USA); L 6–8 ^{PP}	Bye	Bronze medal match Marín (CUB); L 0–6 ^{P0}	=5

Greco-Roman

Athlete	Event	Round of 16	Quarterfinal	Semifinal	Repechage	Final / BM	
Athlete	Event	Opposition Result	Opposition Result	Opposition Result	Opposition Result	Opposition Result	Rank
Zholaman Sharshenbekov	Men's −60 kg	Sultangali (KAZ); W 6–3 ^{PP}	Arnăut (ROM); W 9–0 ^{ST}	Fumita (JPN); L 3–4 ^{PP}	—	Mohsennejad (IRI) W 3–1	3rd place, bronze medalist(s)
Amantur Ismailov	Men's −67 kg	Zoidze (GEO); W 12–1 ^{ST}	Nasibov (UKR); L 7–6 ^{PP}	Did not advance	Nemeš (SRB); W 8–0 ^{ST}	Jafarov (AZE); L 0–8	5
Akzhol Makhmudov	Men's −77 kg	Bey (USA); W 4–1 ^{PP}	Zhadrayev (KAZ); L 1–3 ^{PP}	Did not advance	Cuero (COL); W 9–0 ^{ST}	Suleymanov (AZE) W 6–5	3rd place, bronze medalist(s)
Uzur Dzhuzupbekov	Men's −97 kg	Venckaitis (LTU); W 5–1 ^{PP}	Saravi (IRI); L 0–8 ^{ST}	Did not advance	Rau (USA); W 9–4 ^{PP}	Gabr (EGY) W 2–1	3rd place, bronze medalist(s)

== See also ==
- Kyrgyzstan at the 2024 Winter Youth Olympics
- Kyrgyzstan at the 2024 Summer Paralympics
