= Kazakhstan at the 2024 Summer Olympics =

- IOC code: KAZ
- NOC: National Olympic Committee of the Republic of Kazakhstan
- Website: www.olympic.kz (in Kazakh, Russian, and English)

in Paris, France 26 July 2024 – 11 August 2024
- Competitors: 79 (53 men and 26 women) in 20 sports
- Flag bearers (opening): Aslanbek Shymbergenov & Olga Safronova
- Flag bearers (closing): Batyrkhan Toleugali & Elzhana Taniyeva
- Medals Ranked 43rd: Gold 1 Silver 3 Bronze 3 Total 7

Summer Olympics appearances (overview)
- 1996; 2000; 2004; 2008; 2012; 2016; 2020; 2024; 2028

Other related appearances
- Russian Empire (1900–1912); Soviet Union (1952–1988); Unified Team (1992)

Kazakhstan competed at the 2024 Summer Olympics in Paris from 26 July to 11 August 2024. It was the nation's eighth consecutive appearance at the Summer Olympics in the post-Soviet era.

== Medalists ==
Medal	Name	Sport	Event	Date
Gold	Yeldos Smetov	Judo	Men's 60 kg	27 July
Silver	Nariman Kurbanov	Gymnastics	Men's pommel horse	3 August
Silver	Demeu Zhadrayev	Wrestling	Men's Greco-Roman −77 kg	7 August
Silver	Nurbek Oralbay	Boxing	Middleweight	7 August
Bronze	Alexandra Le; Islam Satpayev	Shooting	Mixed 10 m air rifle team	27 July
Bronze	Gusman Kyrgyzbayev	Judo	Men's 66 kg	28 July
Bronze	Nazym Kyzaibay	Boxing	Women's 50 kg	6 August

Medals by sport
Sport	1st place, gold medalist(s)	2nd place, silver medalist(s)	3rd place, bronze medalist(s)	Total
Gymnastics	0	1	0	1
Judo	1	0	1	2
Boxing	0	1	1	2
Shooting	0	0	1	1
Wrestling	0	1	0	1
Total	1	3	3	7

Medals by gender
Gender	1st place, gold medalist(s)	2nd place, silver medalist(s)	3rd place, bronze medalist(s)	Total
Female	0	0	1	1
Male	1	3	1	5
Mixed	0	0	1	1
Total	1	3	3	7

Medals by date
Date	1st place, gold medalist(s)	2nd place, silver medalist(s)	3rd place, bronze medalist(s)	Total
27 July	1	0	1	2
28 July	0	0	1	1
3 August	0	1	0	1
6 August	0	0	1	1
7 August	0	2	0	2
Total	1	3	3	7

== Competitors ==
The following is the list of number of competitors in the Games.

Sport	Men	Women	Total
Archery	3	0	3
Athletics	1	6	7
Badminton	1	0	1
Boxing	7	3	10
Breaking	1	0	1
Canoeing	4	2	6
Cycling	3	0	3
Fencing	3	1	4
Gymnastics	3	1	4
Judo	5	3	8
Modern pentathlon	1	1	2
Rowing	1	0	1
Shooting	4	5	9
Sport climbing	1	0	1
Swimming	1	1	2
Table tennis	1	0	1
Taekwondo	2	0	2
Tennis	3	2	5
Triathlon	0	1	1
Wrestling	8	0	8
Total	53	26	79

== Archery ==
Kazakhstan entered three archers to compete at the Games. The nation's fielded full squad of men's team recurve by scoring a successful gold-medal victory at the 2023 Asian Archery Championships in Bangkok, Thailand.

Athlete	Event	Ranking round		Round of 64	Round of 32	Round of 16	Quarterfinals	Semifinals	Final / BM	
Athlete	Event	Score	Seed	Opposition Score	Opposition Score	Opposition Score	Opposition Score	Opposition Score	Opposition Score	Rank
Ilfat Abdullin	Men's individual	663	29	Peters (CAN); L 4–6	Did not advance					
Alexandr Yeremenko	Men's individual	640	59	Addis (FRA); L 2–6	Did not advance					
Dauletkeldi Zhangbyrbay	Men's individual	668	22	Enríquez (COL); L 3–7	Did not advance					
Ilfat Abdullin; Alexandr Yeremenko; Dauletkeldi Zhangbyrbay	Men's team	1971	10	—N/a		Italy; L 4–5	Did not advance			

== Athletics ==
Kazakh track and field athletes achieved the entry standards for Paris 2024, either by passing the direct qualifying mark (or time for track and road races) or by world ranking, in the following events (a maximum of 3 athletes each):

Key

- Note–Ranks given for track events are within the athlete's heat only
- Q = Qualified for the next round
- q = Qualified for the next round as a fastest loser or, in field events, by position without achieving the qualifying target
- NR = National record
- N/A = Round not applicable for the event
- Bye = Athlete not required to compete in round

Track and road events

Athlete	Event	Heat		Repechage		Semifinal		Final	
Athlete	Event	Result	Rank	Result	Rank	Result	Rank	Result	Rank
David Yefremov	Men's 110 m hurdles	13.88	7 R	DQ		Did not advance			
Olga Safronova	Women's 200 m	23.58	43	23.70	23	Did not advance			
Daisy Jepkemei	Women's 10000 m	—N/a						31:26.55	17
Daisy Jepkemei	Women's 3000 m steeplechase	9:24.69	23	—N/a				Did not advance	
Norah Jeruto	Women's 3000 m steeplechase	9:16.46	14 Q SB	—N/a				9:08.97	9 SB
Zhanna Mamazhanova	Women's marathon	—N/a						2:30:51	33

Field events

Athlete	Event	Qualification		Final	
Athlete	Event	Distance	Position	Distance	Position
Nadezhda Dubovitskaya	Women's high jump	1.83	28	Did not advance	
Yelizaveta Matveyeva	Women's high jump	1.88	19	Did not advance	

== Badminton ==
Kazakhstan entered one badminton players into the Olympic tournament based on the BWF Race to Paris Rankings.

Athlete	Event	Group stage			Elimination	Quarter-final	Semi-final	Final / BM	
Athlete	Event	Opposition Score	Opposition Score	Rank	Opposition Score	Opposition Score	Opposition Score	Opposition Score	Rank
Dmitriy Panarin	Men's singles	Nishimoto (JPN); L 0–2	Yang (CAN); L 0–2	3	Did not advance				

== Boxing ==
Kazakhstan entered ten boxer into the Olympic tournament. Kamshybek Kunkabayev (men's super heavyweight) and Karina Ibragimova (women's featherweight) secured their spots in their respective division by advancing to the final and semifinal round at the 2022 Asian Games in Hangzhou, China. The other six boxers, qualified themself to Paris by winning the quota bouts round, in their respective division, at the 2024 World Olympic Qualification Tournament 1 in Busto Arsizio, Italy. Lastly, Bazarbay Mukhammedsabyr, Nazym Kyzaibay and Valentina Khalzova qualified for the games by winning the quota bouts round at the 2024 World Olympic Qualification Tournament 2 in Bangkok, Thailand.

=== Men ===
Athlete	Event	Round of 32	Round of 16	Quarterfinals	Semifinals	Final	
Athlete	Event	Opposition Result	Opposition Result	Opposition Result	Opposition Result	Opposition Result	Rank
Saken Bibossinov	51 kg	Bye	Gümüş (TUR); W 5–0	Dusmatov (UZB); L 2–3	Did not advance		
Makhmud Sabyrkhan	57 kg	Bye	Quiles (ESP); L 1–4	Did not advance			
Mukhammedsabyr Bazarbayuly	63.5 kg	Ibarreche (ESP); W 5–0	Lai (TPE); W 3–2	Guruli (GEO); L 2–3	Did not advance		
Aslanbek Shymbergenov	71 kg	Ishaish (JOR); L 2–3	Did not advance				
Nurbek Oralbay	80 kg	Bye	Peters (AUS); W 3–2	Allahverdiyev (AZE); W 5–0	Cristian Pinales (DOM); W 3–2	Oleksandr Khyzhniak (UKR); L 2–3	2nd place, silver medalist(s)
Aibek Oralbay	92 kg	—N/a	Olaore (NGR); W 5–0	Alfonso (AZE); L 2–3	Did not advance		
Kamshybek Kunkabayev	+92 kg	—N/a	Ghadfa (ESP); L 2–3	Did not advance			

=== Women ===
Athlete	Event	Round of 32	Round of 16	Quarterfinals	Semifinals	Final	
Athlete	Event	Opposition Result	Opposition Result	Opposition Result	Opposition Result	Opposition Result	Rank
Nazym Kyzaibay	50 kg	Sorrentino (ITA); W 4–1	de Almeida (BRA); W 5–0	Valencia (COL) W 4–1	Wu Yu (CHN); L 1–4	Did not advance	3rd place, bronze medalist(s)
Karina Ibragimova	57 kg	Bye	Lozada (PUR); L 0–5	Did not advance			
Valentina Khalzova	75 kg	—N/a	Bylon (PAN); L 1–4	Did not advance			

== Breaking ==
Kazakhstan entered one breakdancer to compete in the B-Boy dual battles for Paris 2024. Amir Zakirov (Amir) outlasted the male breakdancers from 2024 Olympic Qualifier Series in Shanghai, China and Budapest, Hungary.

Athlete	Nickname	Event	Qualification		Quarterfinal	Semifinal	Final / BM	
Athlete	Nickname	Event	Points	Rank	Opposition Result	Opposition Result	Opposition Result	Rank
Amir Zakirov	Amir	B-Boys	12	2 QF	Victor (USA); L 0–3 (3–24)	Did not advanced		

== Canoeing ==
=== Sprint ===
Kazakh canoeists qualified four boats for the Games through the result of highest rank eligible nation's in the following events, through the 2024 Asian Olympic in Tokyo, Japan.

Athlete	Event	Heats		Quarterfinals		Semifinals		Final	
Athlete	Event	Time	Rank	Time	Rank	Time	Rank	Time	Rank
Sergey Yemelyanov; Timur Khaidarov	Men's C-2 500 m	1:45.94	5 QF	1:44.03	4 FB	—N/a		1:46.75	10
Bekarys Ramatulla; Sergii Tokarnytskyi	Men's K-2 500 m	1:38.62	5 QF	1:37.58	6	Did not advance			
Mariya Brovkova; Rufina Iskakova	Women's C-2 500 m	2:00.05	5 QF	2:01.76	4 FB	—N/a		1:57.58	11

Qualification Legend: FA = Qualify to final (medal); FB = Qualify to final B (non-medal)

== Cycling ==
=== Road ===
Kazakhstan entered two male road cyclists into the games. Kazakhstan secured those quota through the UCI Nation Ranking.

Athlete	Event	Time	Rank
Alexey Lutsenko	Men's road race	6:26.57	52
Yevgeniy Fedorov	Men's road race	–	DNF
Yevgeniy Fedorov	Men's time trial	38:33.16	21

=== Track ===
Kazakhstan entered one rider, to compete in the men's sprint and keirin events, following the release of the final UCI Olympic rankings.

Sprint

Athlete	Event	Qualification		Round 1	Repechage 1	Round 2	Repechage 2	Round 3	Repechage 3	Quarterfinals	Semifinals	Finals / BM	
Athlete	Event	Time Speed (km/h)	Rank	Opposition Time Speed (km/h)	Opposition Time Speed (km/h)	Opposition Time Speed (km/h)	Opposition Time Speed (km/h)	Opposition Time Speed (km/h)	Opposition Time Speed (km/h)	Opposition Time Speed (km/h)	Opposition Time Speed (km/h)	Opposition Time Speed (km/h)	Rank
Andrey Chugay	Men's sprint	10.047	30	Did not advance									

Keirin

Athlete	Event	Round 1	Repechage	Quarterfinals	Semifinals	Final
Athlete	Event	Rank	Rank	Rank	Rank	Rank
Andrey Chugay	Men's keirin	5 R	3	Did not advance		

== Fencing ==
Kazakhstan entered five fencers into the Olympic competition. Men's épée team secured quota places after nominated as the highest ranked nations team, eligible for Asia & Oceania zone through the release of the FIE Official ranking for Paris 2024; meanwhile Aigerim Sarybay qualified for the games by winning the gold medal in the women's individual sabre event, at the 2024 Asia and Oceania Zonal Qualifying Tournament in Dubai, United Arab Emirates.

Athlete	Event	Round of 64	Round of 32	Round of 16	Quarterfinal	Semifinal	Final / BM	
Athlete	Event	Opposition Score	Opposition Score	Opposition Score	Opposition Score	Opposition Score	Opposition Score	Rank
Elmir Alimzhanov	Men's épée	Bye	Midelton (FRA); W 15–14	Vismara (ITA); L 13–14	Did not advance			
Ruslan Kurbanov	Men's épée	Bye	El Kord (MAR); W 15–13	Cannone (FRA); W 15–10	Kano (JPN); L 6–15	Did not advance		
Vadim Sharlaimov	Men's épée	Saner (RSA); W 15–9	Borel (FRA); L 13–15	Did not advance				
Elmir Alimzhanov; Ruslan Kurbanov; Vadim Sharlaimov	Men's team épée	—N/a			Hungary; L 30–45	Classification Semifinal Egypt; W 36–21	Classification Final Italy; L 36–45	6
Aigerim Sarybay	Women's sabre	Benadouda (ALG); W 15–9	Brunet (FRA); L 12–15	Did not advance				

== Gymnastics ==
=== Artistic ===
Kazakhstan qualified two gymnasts. Milad Karimi qualified for the games, by being among the highest-ranked eligible athlete in the All-around at the 2023 World Artistic Gymnastics Championships; meanwhile Nariman Kurbanov qualified for the games through the final accumulations of 2024 Apparatus World Cup Series ranking.

Men

Athlete	Event	Qualification								Final							
Athlete	Event	Apparatus						Total	Rank	Apparatus						Total	Rank
Athlete	Event	F	PH	R	V	PB	HB	Total	Rank	F	PH	R	V	PB	HB	Total	Rank
Milad Karimi	All-around	14.433	13.266 Q	13.000	14.300	14.366	12.700	82.065	18 Q	13.433	8.533	12.933	14.400	14.066	12.700	76.065	24
Nariman Kurbanov	pommel horse	—N/a	15 Q	—N/a						—N/a	15.433	—N/a					2nd place, silver medalist(s)

- Gymnastics at the 2024 Summer Olympics – Men's pommel horse
- Gymnastics at the 2024 Summer Olympics – Men's floor

=== Rhythmic ===
Kazakhstan entered one rhythmic gymnast into the games by virtue of winning the gold medal in the individual all-around events, at the 2024 Asian Championships in Tashkent, Uzbekistan.

Athlete	Event	Qualification						Final					
Athlete	Event	Hoop	Ball	Clubs	Ribbon	Total	Rank	Hoop	Ball	Clubs	Ribbon	Total	Rank
Elzhana Taniyeva	Individual	30.850	32.000	32.300	31.450	126.600	13 R3	Did not advance					

=== Trampoline ===
Kazakhstan qualified one gymnast for Paris 2024. One athletes qualified to compete in the men's trampoline competition at Paris 2024, through the 2023–2024 Trampoline World Cup series.

Athlete	Event	Qualification		Final	
Athlete	Event	Score	Rank	Score	Rank
Danil Mussabayev	Men's	58.07	9	Did not advance	

== Judo ==
Kazakhstan has qualified eight judokas via the IJF World Ranking List, continental quotas in Asia and team invitation.

Athlete	Event	Round of 64	Round of 32	Round of 16	Quarterfinals	Semifinals	Repechage	Final / BM	
Athlete	Event	Opposition Result	Opposition Result	Opposition Result	Opposition Result	Opposition Result	Opposition Result	Opposition Result	Rank
Yeldos Smetov	Men's −60 kg	—N/a	Tsjakadoea (NED); W 10–00	Khalmatov (UKR); W 01–00	Yang Y-w (TPE); W 01–00	Garrigós (ESP); W 10–00	—N/a	Mkheidze (FRA); W 01–00	1st place, gold medalist(s)
Gusman Kyrgyzbayev	Men's −66 kg	—N/a	García Torné (ESP); W 01–00	Ba-ul (KOR); W 01–00	Khyar (FRA); W 10–00	Lima (BRA); L 00–10	—N/a	Bunčić (SRB); W 01–00	3rd place, bronze medalist(s)
Daniyar Shamshayev	Men's −73 kg	—N/a	Yuldoshev (UZB); L 00–10	Did not advance					
Abylaikhan Zhubanazar	Men's −81 kg	Bye	Ungvári (HUN); L 00–01	Did not advance					
Nurlykhan Sharkhan	Men's −100 kg	—N/a	Nikiforov (BEL); W 10–00	Turoboyev (UZB); L 01–11	Did not advance				
Abiba Abuzhakynova	Women's −48 kg	—N/a	Rishony (ISR); W 01–00	Lin C-h (TPE); W 10–00	Martínez (ESP); L 00–10	—N/a	Narváez (PAR); W 10–00	Babulfath (SWE); L 00–10	5
Esmigul Kuyulova	Women's −63 kg	—N/a	Renshall (GBR); L 00–01	Did not advance					
Kamila Berlikash	Women's +78 kg	—N/a	Adiyaasüren (MGL); L 00–10	Did not advance					

Mixed

Athlete	Event	Round of 32	Round of 16	Quarterfinals	Semifinals	Repechage	Final / BM	
Athlete	Event	Opposition Result	Opposition Result	Opposition Result	Opposition Result	Opposition Result	Opposition Result	Rank
Abiba Abuzhakynova; Daniyar Shamshayev; Esmigul Kuyulova Abylaikhan Zhubanazar; Kamila Berlikash; Nurlykhan Sharkhan	Team	–	Brazil; L 2–4	Did not advance				

== Modern pentathlon ==
Kazakhstani modern pentathletes confirmed two quota places for the Olympic games. Georgiy Boroda-Dudochkin and Yelena Potapenko secured their spots in the men's and women's event by virtue of top five eligible nation's through the 2022 Asian Games in Hangzhou, China.

Athlete	Event		Fencing (épée one touch)				Riding (show jumping)			Swimming (200 m freestyle)			Combined: shooting/running (10 m laser pistol)/(3000 m)			Total points	Final rank
Athlete	Event		RR	BR	Rank	MP points	Penalties	Rank	MP points	Time	Rank	MP points	Time	Rank	MP points	Total points	Final rank
Georgiy Boroda-Dudochkin	Men's	Semifinal	10–25	2	17	177	0	5	300	2:08.28	17	294	10:19.91	11	681	1452	16
Georgiy Boroda-Dudochkin	Men's	Final	10–25	Did not advance													
Yelena Potapenko	Women's	Semifinal	15–20	0	16	200	21	14	279	2:16.67	9	277	12:35.18	16	545	1301	15
Yelena Potapenko	Women's	Final	15–20	Did not advance													

== Rowing ==
Kazakhstani rowers qualified one boats in the men's single sculls for the Games, through the 2024 Asia & Oceania Qualification Regatta in Chungju, South Korea.

Athlete	Event	Heats		Repechage		Quarterfinals		Semifinals		Final	
Athlete	Event	Time	Rank	Time	Rank	Time	Rank	Time	Rank	Time	Rank
Vladislav Yakovlev	Men's single sculls	7:21.56	5 R	7:21.12	4 SE/F	—N/a		7:26.20	1 FE	6:59.43	25

Qualification Legend: FA=Final A (medal); FB=Final B (non-medal); FC=Final C (non-medal); FD=Final D (non-medal); FE=Final E (non-medal); FF=Final F (non-medal); SA/B=Semifinals A/B; SC/D=Semifinals C/D; SE/F=Semifinals E/F; QF=Quarterfinals; R=Repechage

== Shooting ==
Kazakhstani shooters achieved quota places for the following events based on their results at the 2022 and 2023 ISSF World Championships, 2023 and 2024 Asian Championships, and 2024 ISSF World Olympic Qualification Tournament.

Men

Athlete	Event	Qualification		Final	
Athlete	Event	Points	Rank	Points	Rank
Islam Satpayev	10 m air rifle	628	21	Did not advance	
Konstantin Malinovskiy	10 m air rifle	626.6	32	Did not advance	
Islam Satpayev	50 m rifle 3 positions	588	18	Did not advance	
Konstantin Malinovskiy	50 m rifle 3 positions	586	25	Did not advance	
Nikita Chiryukin	10 m air pistol	575	15	Did not advance	
Nikita Chiryukin	25 m rapid fire pistol	583	10	Did not advance	
Eduard Yechshenko	Skeet	115	26	Did not advance	

Women

Athlete	Event	Qualification		Final	
Athlete	Event	Points	Rank	Points	Rank
Arina Altukhova	10 metre air rifle	627	17	Did not advance	
Alexandra Le	10 metre air rifle	631	6 Q	165.4	6
Arina Altukhova	50 m rifle 3 positions	586	3	Did not advance	
Alexandra Le	50 m rifle 3 positions	587	10	Did not advance	
Irina Yunusmetova	10 m air pistol	574	11	Did not advance	
Mariya Dmitriyenko	Trap	120	10	Did not advance	
Assem Orynbay	Skeet	116	18	Did not advance	

Mixed

Athlete	Event	Qualification		Final	
Athlete	Event	Points	Rank	Points	Rank
Alexandra Le; Islam Satpayev	10 m air rifle team	630.8	3 QB	Ulbrich / Janßen (GER); W 17–5	3rd place, bronze medalist(s)
Arina Altukhova; Konstantin Malinovskiy	10 m air rifle team	621.3	27	Did not advance	

Shooting at the 2024 Summer Olympics – Mixed skeet team – 12th

== Sport climbing ==
Kazakhstan qualified one climber for Paris 2024. Amir Maimuratov qualified directly for the men's speed events, through the 2024 Olympic Qualifier series ranking.

Speed

Athlete	Event	Qualification		Round of 16	Quarterfinals	Semifinals	Final / BM	
Athlete	Event	Time	Rank	Opposition Time	Opposition Time	Opposition Time	Opposition Time	Rank
Amir Maimuratov	Men's	4.89	2	Bruyns (RSA); W 4.94–5.84	Alipour (IRI); L 6.14–5.57	Did not advance		5

== Swimming ==
Kazakhstan sent two swimmers to compete at the 2024 Paris Olympics.

Athlete	Event	Heat		Semifinal		Final	
Athlete	Event	Time	Rank	Time	Rank	Time	Rank
Adilbek Mussin	Men's 100 m freestyle	49,92	41	Did not advance			
Adilbek Mussin	Men's 100 m butterfly	52,74	29	Did not advance			
Kseniya Ignatova	Women's 100 m backstroke	1:02,51	26	Did not advance			

== Table tennis ==
Kazakhstan entered one table tennis players into Paris 2024. Kirill Gerassimenko qualified for the games through topping the Asian continental ranking.

Athlete	Event	Preliminary	Round 1	Round 2	Round of 16	Quarterfinals	Semifinals	Final / BM	
Athlete	Event	Opposition Result	Opposition Result	Opposition Result	Opposition Result	Opposition Result	Opposition Result	Opposition Result	Rank
Kirill Gerassimenko	Men's singles	Bye	Burgos (CHI); W 4–0	Qiu (GER); W 4–3	Assar (EGY); L 2–4	Did not advance			

== Taekwondo ==
Kazakhstan qualified two athletes to compete at the games. Batyrkhan Toleugali and Samirkhon Ababakirov qualified for their games, following the triumph of their victory in the semifinal rounds, in their respective classes, at the 2024 Asian Qualification Tournament in Tai'an, China.

Athlete	Event	Qualification	Round of 16	Quarterfinals	Semifinals	Repechage	Final / BM	
Athlete	Event	Opposition Result	Opposition Result	Opposition Result	Opposition Result	Opposition Result	Opposition Result	Rank
Samirkhon Ababakirov	Men's −58 kg	Bye	Dell'Aquila (ITA); L 1–2	Did not advance				
Batyrkhan Toleugali	Men's −80 kg	Coulibaly (MLI); W 2–1	Simone Alessio (ITA); L 0–2	Did not advance				

== Tennis ==
Kazakhstan entered five tennis players into the games. All of those athletes qualified directly for the games after being included in the top 64 eligible tennis players, through the ATP and WTA ranking lists. Both female players eventually withdrew from the women's singles competition.

Athlete	Event	Round of 64	Round of 32	Round of 16	Quarterfinals	Semifinals	Final / BM	
Athlete	Event	Opposition Score	Opposition Score	Opposition Score	Opposition Score	Opposition Score	Opposition Score	Rank
Alexander Bublik	Men's singles	Fritz (USA); L 4–6, 4–6	Did not advance					
Alexander Shevchenko	Men's singles	Menšík (CZE); L 3–6, 4–6	Did not advance					
Alexander Bublik; Aleksandr Nedovyesov	Men's doubles	—N/a	Monteiro/ Seyboth Wild (BRA); L 4–6, 4–6	Did not advance				
Elena Rybakina	Women's singles	Cristian (ROU)	Withdrew due to illness					
Yulia Putintseva	Women's singles	Kostyuk (UKR)	Withdrew due to injury					

== Triathlon ==
Kazakhstan entered one female triathlete in the triathlon events for Paris, following the release of final individual olympics qualification ranking.

Individual

Athlete	Event	Time						Rank
Athlete	Event	Swim (1.5 km)	Trans 1	Bike (40 km)	Trans 2	Run (10 km)	Total	Rank
Ekaterina Shabalina	Women's	28:06	DNF	DNF	DNF	DNF	–	55

== Wrestling ==
Kazakhstan qualified eight wrestlers for the following classes into the Olympic competition. Azamat Dauletbekov and Nursultan Tursynov qualified for the games by virtue of top five results through the 2023 World Championships in Belgrade, Serbia; meanwhile the other wrestlers secured their spots, in their own respective divisions, after winning the semifinal round at the 2024 Asian Olympic Qualification Tournament in Bishkek, Kyrgyzstan. Later, Meirambek Kartbay secured a spot due to the reallocations of Individual Neutral Athletes quotas.

Key:

- VT (ranking points: 5–0 or 0–5) – Victory by fall.
- VB (ranking points: 5–0 or 0–5) – Victory by injury (VF for forfeit, VA for withdrawal or disqualification)
- PP (ranking points: 3–1 or 1–3) – Decision by points – the loser with technical points.
- PO (ranking points: 3–0 or 0–3) – Decision by points – the loser without technical points.
- ST (ranking points: 4–0 or 0–4) – Great superiority – the loser without technical points and a margin of victory of at least 8 (Greco-Roman) or 10 (freestyle) points.
- SP (ranking points: 4–1 or 1–4) – Technical superiority – the loser with technical points and a margin of victory of at least 8 (Greco-Roman) or 10 (freestyle) points.

Freestyle

Athlete	Event	Round of 16	Quarterfinal	Semifinal	Repechage	Final / BM	
Athlete	Event	Opposition Result	Opposition Result	Opposition Result	Opposition Result	Opposition Result	Rank
Meirambek Kartbay	Men's −57 kg	Almaz Uulu (KGZ); L 1–4	Did not advance				
Azamat Dauletbekov	Men's −86 kg	Brooks (USA); L 3–4	Did not advance				
Alisher Yergali	Men's −97 kg	Elders (EGY); W 6–2	Tazhudinov (BRN); L 2–14	—N/a	Ali Azarpira (IRI); L 1–6	Did not advance	6
Yusup Batirmurzaev	Men's −125 kg	Baran (POL); L 1–4	Did not advance				

Greco-Roman

Athlete	Event	Round of 16	Quarterfinal	Semifinal	Repechage	Final / BM	
Athlete	Event	Opposition Result	Opposition Result	Opposition Result	Opposition Result	Opposition Result	Rank
Aidos Sultangali	Men's −60 kg	Sharshenbekov (KGZ); L 3–6	Did not advance				
Demeu Zhadrayev	Men's −77 kg	Cuero (COL); W 9–0 ^{ST}	Makhmudov (KGZ); W 3–1	Suleymanov (AZE); W 6–1	—N/a	Kusaka (JPN); L 2–5	2nd place, silver medalist(s)
Nursultan Tursynov	Men's −87 kg	Metwally (EGY); W 10–1	Beleniuk (UKR); L 3–7	Did not advance			
Alimkhan Syzdykov	Men's −130 kg	Alex-Ciurariu (ROU); W 3–1	Shariati (AZE); L 0–4	Did not advance			

== See also ==
- Kazakhstan at the 2024 Winter Youth Olympics
- Kazakhstan at the 2024 Summer Paralympics
