= Wrestling at the 2023 Pan American Games – Men's Greco-Roman 77 kg =

Men's Greco-Roman 77 at the 2023 Pan American Games
- Venue: Olympic Training Center in Ñuñoa
- Dates: November 3
- Competitors: 10 from 10 nations

Medalists
Gold medal	Kamal Bey	United States
Silver medal	Joílson Júnior	Brazil
Bronze medal	Yosvanys Peña	Cuba
Bronze medal	Emmanuel Benítez	Mexico

The men's Greco-Roman 77 kg competition of the Wrestling events at the 2023 Pan American Games in Ñuñoa was held on November 3.

== Qualification ==
The winner of each weight category at the 2021 Junior Pan American Games in Cali, Colombia qualified directly, along with the top four at the 2022 Pan American Wrestling Championships and 2023 Pan American Wrestling Championships. The host country (Chile) is guaranteed a spot in each event, but its athletes must compete in both the 2022 and 2023 Pan American Championship. If Chile does not qualify at any of the first two events, it will take the fourth spot available at the 2023 Pan American Championships. A further six wildcards (four men and two women) will be awarded to nations without any qualified athlete but took part in the qualification tournaments.

== Schedule ==
All times are local (UTC−3)

Date	Time	Event
Wednesday, 3 November 2023	10:00	Round of 16
Wednesday, 3 November 2023	11:00	Quarterfinals
Wednesday, 3 November 2023	12:00	Semifinals
Wednesday, 3 November 2023	12:00	Repechage
Wednesday, 3 November 2023	17:00	Finals

== Results ==
Legend

- F — Won by fall

=== Main Bracket ===
Round of 16
Kamal Bey (USA)	9
David Choc (EAI)	1
Jair Cuero (COL)	3
Emmanuel Benítez (MEX)	4

Quarterfinals
Yosvanys Peña (CUB)	3
Kamal Bey (USA)	4
Adrian Maynard (BAR)	0
Eduardo Bernal (CHI)	9
Jon Viruet (PUR)	1
Wuileixis Rivas (VEN)	3
Emmanuel Benítez (MEX)	0
Joílson Júnior (BRA)	8

Semifinals
Kamal Bey (USA)	9
Eduardo Bernal (CHI)	0
Wuileixis Rivas (VEN)	1
Joílson Júnior (BRA)	5

Finals
Kamal Bey (USA)	12^{F}
Joílson Júnior (BRA)	5

=== Repechage ===
Repechage round 1
David Choc (EAI)	0
Yosvanys Peña (CUB)	8

Bronze medal match
Yosvanys Peña (CUB)	9
Eduardo Bernal (CHI)	0
Emmanuel Benítez (MEX)	5
Wuileixis Rivas (VEN)	3

== Final standing ==
Rank	Athlete
1st place, gold medalist(s)	Kamal Bey (USA)
2nd place, silver medalist(s)	Joílson Júnior (BRA)
3rd place, bronze medalist(s)	Yosvanys Peña (CUB)
3rd place, bronze medalist(s)	Emmanuel Benítez (MEX)
5	Eduardo Bernal (CHI)
5	Wuileixis Rivas (VEN)
7	Jair Cuero (COL)
8	Jon Viruet (PUR)
9	David Choc (EAI)
10	Adrian Maynard (BAR)
