= Abdelkrim Ouakali =

Algerian sport wrestler

Personal information
- Nationality: Algerian
- Born: 19 March 1993 (age 33)

Sport
- Sport: Wrestling
- Event: Greco-Roman
Medal record
Representing Algeria
Men's Greco-Roman wrestling
African Championships
Gold medal – first place	2020 Algiers	77 kg
Gold medal – first place	2022 El Jadida	82 kg
Silver medal – second place	2019 Hammamet	82 kg
Silver medal – second place	2014 Tunis	75 kg
Silver medal – second place	2012 Marrakesh	74 kg
African Games
Gold medal – first place	2019 Rabat	77 kg
Gold medal – first place	2023 Accra	77 kg
World Military Championships
Bronze medal – third place	2023 Baku	82 kg
- Updated on 22 October 2019

Abdelkrim Ouakali (born 19 March 1993) is an Algerian Greco-Roman wrestler. He was the winner of the 2019 African Games Greco-Roman 77 kg category.

In 2021, he competed at the 2021 African & Oceania Wrestling Olympic Qualification Tournament hoping to qualify for the 2020 Summer Olympics in Tokyo, Japan. He did not qualify at this tournament and he also failed to qualify for the Olympics at the World Olympic Qualification Tournament held in Sofia, Bulgaria.

He won the gold medal in his event at the 2022 African Wrestling Championships held in El Jadida, Morocco.

== Major results ==
Year	Tournament	Venue	Result	Event
2010	Youth Olympic Games	Singapore	5th	Greco-Roman 69 kg
2012	African Championships	Marrakesh, Morocco	2nd	Greco-Roman 74 kg
2012	Mediterranean Championships	Larissa, Greece	9th	Greco-Roman 74 kg
2013	Mediterranean Games	Mersin, Turkey	8th	Greco-Roman 74 kg
2014	African Championships	Tunis, Tunisia	2nd	Greco-Roman 75 kg
2019	African Championships	Hammamet, Tunisia	2nd	Greco-Roman 82 kg
2019	African Games	El Jadida, Morocco	1st	Greco-Roman 77 kg
2019	World Championships	Nur-Sultan, Kazakhstan	30th	Greco-Roman 77 kg
2020	African Championships	Algiers, Algeria	1st	Greco-Roman 77 kg
2022	African Championships	El Jadida, Morocco	1st	Greco-Roman 82 kg
2022	Mediterranean Games	Oran, Algeria	2nd	Greco-Roman 77 kg
2023	African Championships	Hammamet, Tunisia	1st	Greco-Roman 82 kg
2023	World Championships	Belgrade, Serbia	28th	Greco-Roman 77 kg
2024	African Games	Accra, Ghana	1st	Greco-Roman 77 kg
2024	Olympic Games	Paris, France	16th	Greco-Roman 77 kg

== Doping sanctions ==
On 14 February 2015 Ouakali had produce positive doping test at the 2015 Algerian National Championships. He used Furosemide and he was banned between 12 March 2015 and 11 March 2019.

In October 2016, Ouakali was issued with a second ban of three-years backdated to July 2028 for an anti-doping rule violation after testing positive for boldenone.
