= 2026 World Wrestling Championships – Men's Greco-Roman 82 kg =

Wrestling competitions

Men's Greco-Roman 82 kg at the 2026 World Championships
- Venue: Barys Arena
- Dates: 24–25 October 2026
- Competitors: 25 from 25 nations

Medalists
gold medal	Gholamreza Farrokhi	Iran
silver medal	Yüksel Sarıçiçek	Turkey
bronze medal	Mihail Bradu	Moldova
bronze medal	Akzhol Makhmudov	Kyrgyzstan

The men's Greco-Roman 82 kilograms is a competition featured at the 2026 World Wrestling Championships, and was held in Astana, Kazakhstan on 24 and 25 October 2026.

This Greco-Roman wrestling competition consists of a single-elimination tournament, with a repechage used to determine the winner of two bronze medals. The two finalists face off for gold and silver medals. Each wrestler who loses to one of the two finalists moves into the repechage, culminating in a pair of bronze medal matches, featuring the semifinal losers each facing the remaining repechage opponent from their half of the bracket.

== Results ==
Legend

- F — Won by fall

=== Final ===
Final
Gholamreza Farrokhi (IRI)	7
Yüksel Sarıçiçek (TUR)	1

=== Top half ===
Round of 32
Svetoslav Nikolov (BUL)	5
Mykyta Politaiev (UKR)	4
Samvel Grigoryan (ARM)	1
Gamzat Gadzhiev (RUS)	2
Albin Olofsson (SWE)	5
Jalgasbay Berdimuratov (UZB)	5
Lee Ba-da (KOR)	0
Zoltán Lévai (HUN)	8
Tatsuya Fujii (JPN)	9^{F}
Eduardo Bernal (CHI)	1

Round of 16
Karlo Kodrić (CRO)	1
Svetoslav Nikolov (BUL)	1
Gamzat Gadzhiev (RUS)	4
Jalgasbay Berdimuratov (UZB)	2
Gholamreza Farrokhi (IRI)	6^{F}
Zoltán Lévai (HUN)	0
Tatsuya Fujii (JPN)	0
Mihail Bradu (MDA)	9

Quarterfinals
Karlo Kodrić (CRO)	2
Gamzat Gadzhiev (RUS)	3
Gholamreza Farrokhi (IRI)	9
Mihail Bradu (MDA)	0

Semifinals
Gamzat Gadzhiev (RUS)	3
Gholamreza Farrokhi (IRI)	3

=== Bottom half ===
Round of 32
Ibragim Magomadov (KAZ)	3
Luca Dariozzi (ITA)	3
Kamal Bey (USA)	2
Bahejiang Halishan (CHN)	4
Viktor Nemeš (SRB)	3
Prince (IND)	1
Akzhol Makhmudov (KGZ)	5
Emad Abouelatta (EGY)	1

Round of 16
Shahin Badaghi (QAT)	4
Ibragim Magomadov (KAZ)	3
Bahejiang Halishan (CHN)	5
Yüksel Sarıçiçek (TUR)	7
Gurban Gurbanov (AZE)	8
Viktor Nemeš (SRB)	0
Akzhol Makhmudov (KGZ)	9
Gela Bolkvadze (GEO)	0

Quarterfinals
Shahin Badaghi (QAT)	2
Yüksel Sarıçiçek (TUR)	10
Gurban Gurbanov (AZE)	6
Akzhol Makhmudov (KGZ)	7

Semifinals
Yüksel Sarıçiçek (TUR)	6
Akzhol Makhmudov (KGZ)	0

=== Repechage ===
Repechage round 2
Zoltán Lévai (HUN)	1
Mihail Bradu (MDA)	3
Bahejiang Halishan (CHN)	5
Shahin Badaghi (QAT)	5

Bronze medals
Mihail Bradu (MDA)	3
Gamzat Gadzhiev (RUS)	3
Bahejiang Halishan (CHN)	5
Akzhol Makhmudov (KGZ)	6

== Final standing ==
Rank	Athlete
1st place, gold medalist(s)	Gholamreza Farrokhi (IRI)
2nd place, silver medalist(s)	Yüksel Sarıçiçek (TUR)
3rd place, bronze medalist(s)	Mihail Bradu (MDA)
3rd place, bronze medalist(s)	Akzhol Makhmudov (KGZ)
5	Gamzat Gadzhiev (RUS)
5	Bahejiang Halishan (CHN)
7	Tatsuya Fujii (JPN)
8	Gurban Gurbanov (AZE)
9	Zoltán Lévai (HUN)
10	Shahin Badaghi (QAT)
11	Jalgasbay Berdimuratov (UZB)
12	Svetoslav Nikolov (BUL)
13	Ibragim Magomadov (KAZ)
14	Karlo Kodrić (CRO)
15	Viktor Nemeš (SRB)
16	Albin Olofsson (SWE)
17	Mykyta Politaiev (UKR)
18	Luca Dariozzi (ITA)
19	Kamal Bey (USA)
20	Samvel Grigoryan (ARM)
21	Prince (IND)
22	Emad Abouelatta (EGY)
23	Eduardo Bernal (CHI)
24	Lee Ba-da (KOR)
25	Gela Bolkvadze (GEO)
