= Wrestling at the 2019 Pan American Games – Men's Greco-Roman 77 kg =

Men's Greco-Roman 77 kg at the 2019 Pan American Games
- Venue: Miguel Grau Coliseum
- Dates: August 7
- Competitors: 9 from 9 nations

Medalists
Gold medal	Pat Smith	United States
Silver medal	Wuileixis Rivas	Venezuela
Bronze medal	Jair Cuero	Colombia
Bronze medal	Yosvanys Peña	Cuba

The Men's Greco-Roman 77 kg competition of the Wrestling events at the 2019 Pan American Games in Lima was held on August 7 at the Miguel Grau Coliseum.

== Results ==
All times are local (UTC−5)

Legend

- F — Won by fall

=== Final ===
Qualifications
David Choc (GUA)	0
Johan Batista (DOM)	8

Quarterfinals
Pat Smith (USA)	4
Jair Cuero (COL)	1
Angello Hurtado (PER)	0
Emmanuel Benítez (MEX)	8
Wuileixis Rivas (VEN)	9
Ângelo Moreira (BRA)	0
Yosvanys Peña (CUB)	6
Johan Batista (DOM)	0

Semifinals
Pat Smith (USA)	5
Emmanuel Benítez (MEX)	1
Wuileixis Rivas (VEN)	5^{F}
Yosvanys Peña (CUB)	2

Finals
Pat Smith (USA)	3
Wuileixis Rivas (VEN)	2

=== Repechage ===
Repechage round 2
Bye
Jair Cuero (COL)
Bye
Ângelo Moreira (BRA)

Bronze medal match
Jair Cuero (COL)	5
Emmanuel Benítez (MEX)	1
Ângelo Moreira (BRA)	0
Yosvanys Peña (CUB)	8
