= 2022 U23 World Wrestling Championships – Men's Greco-Roman 77 kg =

Wrestling competitions

Men's Greco-Roman 77 kg at the 2022 U23 World Championships
- Venue: Pontevedra Municipal Sports Hall
- Dates: 17–18 October
- Competitors: 23 from 23 nations

Medalists
gold medal	Malkhas Amoyan	Armenia
silver medal	Alexandrin Guțu	Moldova
bronze medal	Sajan Bhanwal	India
bronze medal	Nao Kusaka	Japan

The men's Greco-Roman 77 kilograms is a competition featured at the 2022 U23 World Wrestling Championships, and was held in Pontevedra, Spain on 17 and 18 October 2022. The qualification rounds were held on 17 October while medal matches were held on the 2nd day of the competition. A total of 23 wrestlers competed in this event, limited to athletes whose body weight was less than 77 kilograms.

This Greco-Roman wrestling competition consists of a single-elimination tournament, with a repechage used to determine the winner of two bronze medals. The two finalists face off for gold and silver medals. Each wrestler who loses to one of the two finalists moves into the repechage, culminating in a pair of bronze medal matches featuring the semifinal losers each facing the remaining repechage opponent from their half of the bracket.

== Results ==
Legend

- F — Won by fall
- R — Retired

=== Final ===
Final
Alexandrin Guțu (MDA)	2
Malkhas Amoyan (ARM)	7

=== Top half ===
Round of 32
Aistis Liaugminas (LTU)	0
Sajan Bhanwal (IND)	3
Attila Tösmagi (HUN)	9
Daniel Bello (VEN)	0
Britton Holmes (USA)	1
Lamjed Maafi (TUN)	10

Round of 16
Rassul Zhunis (KAZ)	4
David Zhytomyrsky (ISR)	2
Sajan Bhanwal (IND)	0
Alexandrin Guțu (MDA)	8
Dmytro Vasetskyi (UKR)	9
Attila Tösmagi (HUN)	0
Lamjed Maafi (TUN)	4
Edvin Kin (EST)	3^{R}

Quarterfinals
Rassul Zhunis (KAZ)	2
Alexandrin Guțu (MDA)	4
Dmytro Vasetskyi (UKR)	5
Lamjed Maafi (TUN)	3

Semifinals
Alexandrin Guțu (MDA)	11
Dmytro Vasetskyi (UKR)	1

=== Bottom half ===
Round of 32
Nao Kusaka (JPN)	10
Akseli Yli-Hannuksela (FIN)	0
Idris Ibaev (GER)	11
Davit Sologashvili (GEO)	2
Patryk Bednarz (POL)	0
Abdurrahman Kalkan (TUR)	8
Malkhas Amoyan (ARM)	1
Mohammad Reza Mokhtari (IRI)	1

Round of 16
Júnior Gustavo (ESP)	0
Nao Kusaka (JPN)	7^{F}
Idris Ibaev (GER)	3
Aleksa Ilić (SRB)	1
Akylbek Talantbekov (KGZ)	3
Abdurrahman Kalkan (TUR)	1
Malkhas Amoyan (ARM)	3
Emmanuel Benítez (MEX)	0

Quarterfinals
Nao Kusaka (JPN)	7
Idris Ibaev (GER)	0
Akylbek Talantbekov (KGZ)	1
Malkhas Amoyan (ARM)	2

Semifinals
Nao Kusaka (JPN)	5
Malkhas Amoyan (ARM)	9

== Repechage ==
Repechage round 1
Mohammad Reza Mokhtari (IRI)	11
Emmanuel Benítez (MEX)	0

Repechage round 2
Sajan Bhanwal (IND)	9
Rassul Zhunis (KAZ)	6
Mohammad Reza Mokhtari (IRI)	8
Akylbek Talantbekov (KGZ)	0

Bronze medals
Sajan Bhanwal (IND)	10
Dmytro Vasetskyi (UKR)	10
Mohammad Reza Mokhtari (IRI)	1
Nao Kusaka (JPN)	3

== Final standing ==
Rank	Athlete
1st place, gold medalist(s)	Malkhas Amoyan (ARM)
2nd place, silver medalist(s)	Alexandrin Guțu (MDA)
3rd place, bronze medalist(s)	Sajan Bhanwal (IND)
3rd place, bronze medalist(s)	Nao Kusaka (JPN)
5	Dmytro Vasetskyi (UKR)
5	Mohammad Reza Mokhtari (IRI)
7	Lamjed Maafi (TUN)
8	Idris Ibaev (GER)
9	Abdurrahman Kalkan (TUR)
10	Rassul Zhunis (KAZ)
11	Attila Tösmagi (HUN)
12	Akylbek Talantbekov (KGZ)
13	David Zhytomyrsky (ISR)
14	Davit Sologashvili (GEO)
15	Aleksa Ilić (SRB)
16	Britton Holmes (USA)
17	Edvin Kin (EST)
18	Aistis Liaugminas (LTU)
19	Júnior Gustavo (ESP)
20	Patryk Bednarz (POL)
21	Daniel Bello (VEN)
22	Akseli Yli-Hannuksela (FIN)
23	Emmanuel Benítez (MEX)
