= Gholamreza Farrokhi =

Iranian Greco-Roman wrestler (born 2002)

Personal information
- Native name: غلامرضا فرخی
- Full name: Gholamreza Farrokhi Senjani
- Born: 1 September 2002 (age 24) Shiraz, Iran

Sport
- Sport: Amateur wrestling
- Weight class: 82 kg
- Event: Greco-Roman wrestling
Medal record
Men's Greco-Roman wrestling
Representing Iran
World Championships
Gold medal – first place	2025 Zagreb	82 kg
Gold medal – first place	2026 Astana	82 kg
Islamic Solidarity Games
Gold medal – first place	2025 Riyadh	87 kg
Grand Prix
Gold medal – first place	2025 Zagreb	82 kg
U23 World Championships
Gold medal – first place	2025 Novi Sad	87 kg
University World Cup
Bronze medal – third place	2022 Samsun	72 kg

Gholamreza Farrokhi (Persian: غلامرضا فرخی; born 1 September 2002) is an Iranian Greco-Roman wrestler who competes in the 82kg and 87kg weight classes. He won the gold medal at the 2025 and 2026 World Wrestling Championships.

== Career ==
At the 2025 World Wrestling Championships in Zagreb, Croatia, Farrokhi won the gold medal in the men's Greco-Roman 82 kg event. On his way to the final, he defeated Li Qingzhe of China 9–0 in the Round of 32, Erik Szilvássy of Hungary 8–0 in the Round of 16, Ramon Betschart of Switzerland 9–0 in the quarterfinals, and Karlo Kodrić of Croatia 7–1 in the semifinals. In the final, he overcame Georgia's Gela Bolkvadze with a decisive 4–0 victory to claim the world title.
