= Liu Rui (wrestler) =

Chinese Greco-Roman wrestler

Personal information
- Native name: 刘瑞
- Born: 25 January 1997 (age 29) Linshu County, Linyi, Shandong, China
- Education: Yantai University
- Height: 178 cm (5 ft 10 in)
- Weight: 77 kg (170 lb; 12 st 2 lb)

Sport
- Country: China
- Sport: Amateur wrestling
- Weight class: 77 kg
- Event: Greco-Roman
Medal record
Men's Greco-Roman wrestling
Representing China
Asian Games
Bronze medal – third place	2022 Hangzhou	77 kg
Asian Championships
Bronze medal – third place	2023 Astana	77 kg
Grand Prix
Bronze medal – third place	2023 Bishkek	77 kg

Liu Rui (Chinese: 刘瑞, born 25 January 1997) is a Chinese Greco-Roman wrestler. He won a bronze medal in the 77 kg event at both the 2023 Asian Wrestling Championships and the 2022 Asian Games.

== Background ==
Liu is from Linshu County, Linyi, Shandong. In 2010 he was selected to Linyi City Sports School to train in wrestling and in 2015 became a member of Shandong's provincial Wrestling Team.

== Career ==
In April 2023, Liu won a bronze medal at the 2023 Asian Wrestling Championships after defeating Demeu Zhadrayev.

In October 2023, Liu won a bronze medal at the 2022 Asian Games after defeating Kim Hyeon-woo.

He competed at the 2024 Asian Wrestling Olympic Qualification Tournament in Bishkek, Kyrgyzstan hoping to qualify for the 2024 Summer Olympics in Paris, France. He was eliminated in his second match and he did not qualify for the Olympics.
