= Kamal Bey =

American Greco-Roman wrestler (born 1998)

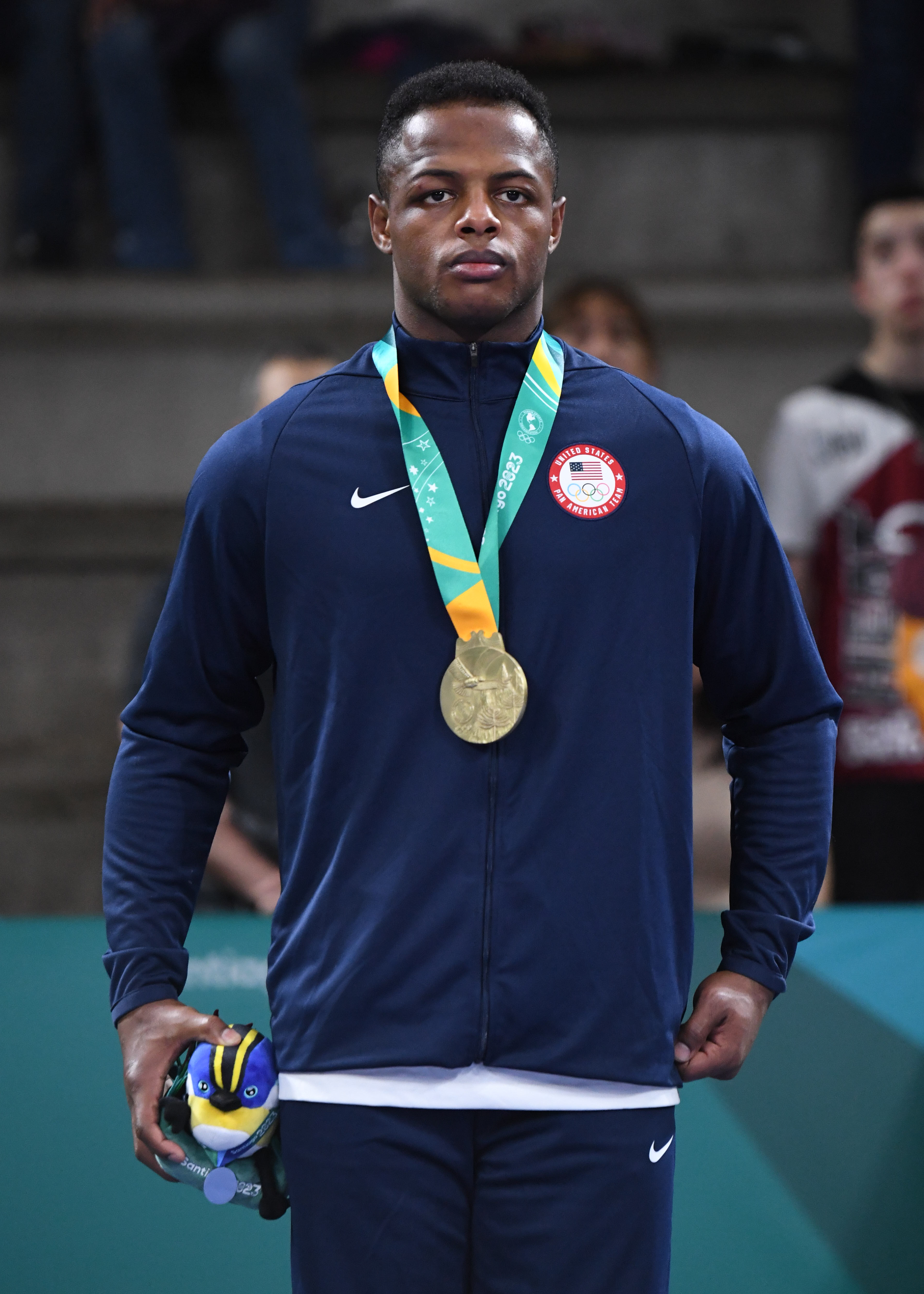
- Bey at the 2023 Pan American Games

Personal information
- Full name: Kamal Ameer Bey
- Born: January 3, 1998 (age 28) Bellwood, Illinois, U.S.
- Height: 5 ft 8 in (173 cm)
- Weight: 77 kg (170 lb)

Sport
- Country: United States
- Sport: Wrestling
- Event: Greco-Roman
- Club: U.S. Army WCAP; Sunkist Kids Wrestling Club
- Coached by: Herb House
Medal record
Men's Greco-Roman wrestling
Representing United States
Pan American Games
Gold medal – first place	2023 Santiago	77 kg
Pan American Championships
Gold medal – first place	2023 Buenos Aires	77 kg
Gold medal – first place	2025 Monterrey	77 kg
Gold medal – first place	2026 Coralville	82 kg
Silver medal – second place	2019 Buenos Aires	77 kg
Bronze medal – third place	2024 Acapulco	77 kg
World Military Championships
Bronze medal – third place	2024 Yerevan	82 kg
US National Championships
Gold medal – first place	2019 Fort Worth	77 kg
US Open Championships
Gold medal – first place	2018 Las Vegas	77 kg
Gold medal – first place	2019 Las Vegas	77 kg
Silver medal – second place	2017 Las Vegas	75 kg
Junior World Championships
Gold medal – first place	2017 Tampere	74 kg

Kamal Ameer Bey OLY (/kəˈmɑːl ˈbeɪ/ kə-MAHL BAY; born January 3, 1998) is an American Greco-Roman wrestler.

== High school ==
Bey attended Oak Park and River Forest High School in Oak Park, Illinois until his junior year. During his high school years in Illinois, he was a USAW Greco-Roman national champion, three-time Greco-Roman All-American, and a Illinois folkstyle state champion.

In August 2015, Bey move to Colorado to train at the United States Olympic Training Center in Colorado Springs and to complete his secondary education at Pine Creek High School.

== Greco-Roman ==
Bey was the U.S. Senior Greco-Roman national champion in 2016 and began training at the Olympic Training Center. He went on to represent the United States in 2016, 2017 and 2018 at the Junior World Championships, placing eight, first and fifth respectively.

In 2016, he placed fourth at the Dave Schultz M. International and claimed a Bill Farrell M. International title. In December, he represented USA at the Club World Championships after winning the US Open and helped the team to place eleventh.

In 2017, he won a Dave Schultz M. International title, placed second at the US Open, third at the Zagreb Grand Prix, and twenty first at the U23 World Championships.

In 2018, he claimed championships at the US Open, Cerro Pelado International and Bill Farrell International. He also competed at the Pan American Championships but was forced to pull out of the tournament after he suffered an injury in his first match. He then went on to place seventeenth at the Germany Grand Prix after losing in the first round. In his final competition of the year, Bey competed at the World Championships, where he placed seventh.

In 2019, he claimed his second Dave Schultz M. International championship, his second-straight US Open championship, placed second at the Pan American Championships and made it to Final X, where he fell short. In December, he won the US National Championship and qualified for the Olympic Trials.

On February 9–10, 2019, Bey competed against Rafael Iunusov in the quarterfinals of the Zagreb Grand Prix. While down 2 points to 6, Bey attacked Iunusov with a right hook to the chin at the end of the match, this led to a disqualification loss. He was not suspended and competed days later at the Hungary Grand Prix.

2020 Olympics

In 2020, Bey placed seventh at the Matteo Pellicone Ranking Series and he was then scheduled to compete at the 2020 US Olympic Team Trials on April 4–5 at State College, Pennsylvania. However, the event was postponed for 2021 along with the Summer Olympics due to the COVID-19 pandemic, leaving all the qualifiers unable to compete.

On October 30, 2020, it was announced by the United States Anti-Doping Agency that Bey had accepted a one-year long suspension, after failing to properly inform and maintain his whereabouts information, missing his opportunity to compete at the 2020 Summer Olympics.

2024 Olympics

Bey represented the United States in the Men's Greco-Roman 77 kilogram wrestling competition at the 2024 Summer Olympics in Paris, and was the 2024 U.S. Olympic Team Trials Champion. Bey lost to his opponent, Akzhol Makhmudov, and ultimately placed 11th in the final standing.

Leading up to the Garmes, Bey won the bronze medal at the 2024 Pan American Wrestling Championships held in Acapulco, Mexico, a few days later, he competed at the 2024 Pan American Wrestling Olympic Qualification Tournament. He was eliminated in his second match. Bey also competed at the 2024 World Wrestling Olympic Qualification Tournament held in Istanbul, Turkey.

== Greco-Roman record ==
Senior Greco-Roman Matches
Res.	Record	Opponent	Score	Date	Event	Location
2020 Matteo Pellicone RS 7th at 77 kg
Loss	54-17	(Venezuela) Wuileixis Rivas	5-7	January 15–18, 2020	2020 Matteo Pellicone Ranking Series	Rome, Italy
Win	54-16	(Uzbekistan) Nurbek Khashimbekov	TF 14-5	January 15–18, 2020	2020 Matteo Pellicone Ranking Series	Rome, Italy
2019 US Nationals (gold) at 77 kg
Win	53-16	(United States) Jake Fisher	5-1	December 20–22, 2019	2019 Senior Nationals - US Olympic Trials Qualifier	(United States) Fort Worth, Texas
Win	52-16	(United States) Corey Hope	TF 14-1	December 20–22, 2019	2019 Senior Nationals - US Olympic Trials Qualifier	(United States) Fort Worth, Texas
Win	51-16	(United States) Alex Mossing	TF 10-1	December 20–22, 2019	2019 Senior Nationals - US Olympic Trials Qualifier	(United States) Fort Worth, Texas
Win	50-16	(United States) Timothy Johnson Thompson	Fall	December 20–22, 2019	2019 Senior Nationals - US Olympic Trials Qualifier	(United States) Fort Worth, Texas
Win	49-16	(United States) Anthonie Linares	TF 10-0	December 20–22, 2019	2019 Senior Nationals - US Olympic Trials Qualifier	(United States) Fort Worth, Texas
2019 US World Team Trials (silver) at 77 kg
Loss	48-16	(United States) Pat Smith	3-6	June 7–8, 2019	2019 Final X: Rutgers	(United States) Piscataway, New Jersey
Loss	48-15	(United States) Pat Smith	1-2	June 7–8, 2019	2019 Final X: Rutgers	(United States) Piscataway, New Jersey
Win	48-14	(United States) Pat Smith	TF 11-2	June 7–8, 2019	2019 Final X: Rutgers	(United States) Piscataway, New Jersey
2019 US Open (gold) at 77 kg
Win	47-14	(United States) Pat Smith	7-5	April 27–29, 2019	2019 US Open Championships	(United States) Las Vegas, Nevada
Win	46-14	(United States) Peyton Walsh	TF 10-1	April 27–29, 2019	2019 US Open Championships	(United States) Las Vegas, Nevada
Win	45-14	(United States) Fritz Schierl	TF 12-0	April 27–29, 2019	2019 US Open Championships	(United States) Las Vegas, Nevada
Win	44-14	(United States) Burke Paddock	TF 14-0	April 27–29, 2019	2019 US Open Championships	(United States) Las Vegas, Nevada
Win	43-14	(United States) Joseph Cornejo	TF 8-0	April 27–29, 2019	2019 US Open Championships	(United States) Las Vegas, Nevada
2019 Pan American Championships (silver) at 77 kg
Loss	42-14	(Cuba) Yosvanys Peña	1-3	April 18–21, 2019	2019 Pan American Wrestling Championships	Buenos Aires, Argentina
Win	42-13	(Guatemala) David Choc	5-3	April 18–21, 2019	2019 Pan American Wrestling Championships	Buenos Aires, Argentina
Win	41-13	(Mexico) Juan Angel Escobar	TF 10-0	April 18–21, 2019	2019 Pan American Wrestling Championships	Buenos Aires, Argentina
Win	40-13	(Ecuador) Enrique Cuero	TF 8-0	April 18–21, 2019	2019 Pan American Wrestling Championships	Buenos Aires, Argentina
2019 Hungary Grand Prix 9th at 77 kg
Loss	39-13	(Hungary) László Szabó	2-4	February 23–24, 2019	2019 Hungarian Grand Prix - Polyák Imre Memorial	Győr, Hungary
Win	39-12	(Slovakia) Leo Drmola	TF 11-0	February 23–24, 2019	2019 Hungarian Grand Prix - Polyák Imre Memorial	Győr, Hungary
2019 Zagreb Grand Prix at 77 kg
Loss	38-12	(Russia) Rafael Iunusov	DQ	February 9–10, 2019	2019 Grand Prix of Zagreb Open	Zagreb, Croatia
Win	38-11	(Italy) Riccardo Vito Abbrescia	7-3	February 9–10, 2019	2019 Grand Prix of Zagreb Open	Zagreb, Croatia
2019 Dave Schultz M. International (gold) at 82 kg
Win	37-11	(United States) Carter Nielsen	6-4	January 24–26, 2019	2019 Dave Schultz Memorial International	(United States) Colorado Springs, Colorado
Win	36-11	(United States) Vladyslav Dombrovskiy	TF 11-2	January 24–26, 2019	2019 Dave Schultz Memorial International	(United States) Colorado Springs, Colorado
Win	35-11	(United States) Spencer Woods	TF 12-2	January 24–26, 2019	2019 Dave Schultz Memorial International	(United States) Colorado Springs, Colorado
2018 World Championships 7th at 77 kg
Loss	34-11	(Azerbaijan) Elvin Mursaliyev	2-6	October 20–28, 2018	2018 World Wrestling Championships	Budapest, Hungary
Win	34-10	(Guatemala) Reinier Jiménez	8-1	October 20–28, 2018	2018 World Wrestling Championships	Budapest, Hungary
Win	33-10	(China) Zhang Ridong	TF 9-0	October 20–28, 2018	2018 World Wrestling Championships	Budapest, Hungary
2018 Germany Grand Prix 17th at 80 kg
Loss	32-10	(Sweden) Khalid Kerchiyev	5-5	August 18–19, 2018	2018 Grand Prix of Germany	Dortmund, Germany
2018 US World Team Trials (gold) at 77 kg
Win	32-9	(United States) Mason Manville	TF 10-0	June 21–22, 2018	2018 US World Team Trials	(United States) Tulsa, Oklahoma
Win	31-9	(United States) Mason Manville	5-3	June 21–22, 2018	2018 US World Team Trials	(United States) Tulsa, Oklahoma
2018 US Open (gold) at 77 kg
Win	30-9	(United States) Peyton Walsh	TF 8-0	April 24–28, 2018	2018 US Open Championships	(United States) Las Vegas, Nevada
Win	29-9	(United States) Jon Jay Chavez	TF 10-0	April 24–28, 2018	2018 US Open Championships	(United States) Las Vegas, Nevada
Win	28-9	(United States) Brandon Mueller	TF 10-0	April 24–28, 2018	2018 US Open Championships	(United States) Las Vegas, Nevada
Win	27-9	(United States) Dylan Reel	Fall	April 24–28, 2018	2018 US Open Championships	(United States) Las Vegas, Nevada
2018 Bill Farrell M. International (gold) at 77 kg
Win	26-9	(United States) Jesse Porter	TF 13-4	March 30–31, 2018	2018 Bill Farrell Memorial International	(United States) New York City, New York
Win	25-9	(United States) Kendrick Sanders	9-8	March 30–31, 2018	2018 Bill Farrell Memorial International	(United States) New York City, New York
Win	24-9	(United States) Colin Schubert	TF 8-0	March 30–31, 2018	2018 Bill Farrell Memorial International	(United States) New York City, New York
2018 Granma y Cerro Pelado (gold) at 77 kg
Win	22-9	(Cuba) Ariel Fis Batista	TF 9-1	February 15–23, 2018	2018 Granma y Cerro Pelado Ranking Series	Havana, Cuba
Win	21-9	(Venezuela) Luis Avendaño	11-4	February 15–23, 2018	2018 Granma y Cerro Pelado Ranking Series	Havana, Cuba
Win	20-9	(Mexico) Juan Angel Escobar	TF 8-0	February 15–23, 2018	2018 Granma y Cerro Pelado Ranking Series	Havana, Cuba
Win	19-9	(Cuba) Yurisandy Hernandez Rios	Fall	February 15–23, 2018	2018 Granma y Cerro Pelado Ranking Series	Havana, Cuba
2018 USA vs. Serbia (silver) at 80 kg
Loss	18-9	(Serbia) Viktor Nemeš	TF 0-9	February 11, 2018	2018 USA vs. Serbia Special Dual Meet	(United States) Boise, Idaho
2017 U23 World Championships 21st at 80 kg
Loss	18-8	(Ukraine) Andrii Antoniuk	TF 0-11	November 21–26, 2017	2017 U23 World Championships	Bydgoszcz, Poland
2017 U23 World Team Trials (gold) at 80 kg
Win	18-7	(United States) Thomas Brackett	TF 8-0	October 7–8, 2017	2017 U23 World Team Trials	(United States) Rochester, Minnesota
Win	17-7	(United States) Thomas Brackett	TF 8-0	October 7–8, 2017	2017 U23 World Team Trials	(United States) Rochester, Minnesota
Win	17-7	(United States) Alex Meyer	9-7	October 7–8, 2017	2017 U23 World Team Trials	(United States) Rochester, Minnesota
Win	16-7	(United States) Zackery Bickford	TF 9-0	October 7–8, 2017	2017 U23 World Team Trials	(United States) Rochester, Minnesota
2017 US Open & WTT (silver) at 75 kg
Loss	15-7	(United States) Mason Manville	TF 0-8	April 26–29, 2017	2017 US World Team Trials	(United States) Las Vegas, Nevada
Loss	15-6	(United States) Mason Manville	8-9	April 26–29, 2017	2017 US World Team Trials	(United States) Las Vegas, Nevada
Win	15-5	(United States) Jon Jay Chavez	16-13	April 26–29, 2017	2017 US Open Championships	(United States) Las Vegas, Nevada
Win	14-5	(United States) Michael Hooker	6-2	April 26–29, 2017	2017 US Open Championships	(United States) Las Vegas, Nevada
2017 Zagreb Grand Prix (bronze) at 80 kg
Win	13-5	(Austria) Michael Wagner	Fall	March 11, 2017	2017 Grand Prix of Zagreb Open	Zagreb, Croatia
Loss	12-5	(Croatia) Božo Starčević	TF 2-10	March 11, 2017	2017 Grand Prix of Zagreb Open	Zagreb, Croatia
Win	12-4	(Japan) Yuya Maeta	Fall	March 11, 2017	2017 Grand Prix of Zagreb Open	Zagreb, Croatia
2017 Dave Schultz M. International (gold) at 75 kg
Win	11-4	(United States) Jesse Porter	5-3	February 1–3, 2017	2017 Dave Schultz Memorial International	(United States) Colorado Springs, Colorado
Win	10-4	(Japan) Kodai Sakuraba	TF 8-0	February 1–3, 2017	2017 Dave Schultz Memorial International	(United States) Colorado Springs, Colorado
Win	9-4	(Argentina) Roni Sosa	TF 8-0	February 1–3, 2017	2017 Dave Schultz Memorial International	(United States) Colorado Springs, Colorado
Win	8-4	(United States) Michael Donato	TF 8-0	February 1–3, 2017	2017 Dave Schultz Memorial International	(United States) Colorado Springs, Colorado
2016 Club World Championships 11th as Team USA
Win	7-4	(Kyrgyzstan) Rustam Rakhmatulaev	9-4	December 8–9, 2016	2016 Club World Championships	Budapest, Hungary
Win	6-4	(Ukraine) Butkhuzi Karaia	TF 12-4	December 8–9, 2016	2016 Club World Championships	Budapest, Hungary
Loss	5-4	(Hungary) Martin Szabo	10-12	December 8–9, 2016	2016 Club World Championships	Budapest, Hungary
Loss	5-3	(Turkey) Emrah Kuş	TF 2-10	December 8–9, 2016	2016 Club World Championships	Budapest, Hungary
2016 Bill Farrell M. International (gold) at 75 kg
Win	5-2	(Egypt) Alec Ortiz	TF 15-5	November 10–12, 2016	2016 Bill Farrell Memorial International	(United States) New York City, New York
Win	4-2	(United States) Bradley Dolezal	Fall	November 10–12, 2016	2016 Bill Farrell Memorial International	(United States) New York City, New York
2016 Dave Schultz M. International 4th at 75 kg
Loss	3-2	(United States) Alec Ortiz	12-19	January 28–30, 2016	2016 Dave Schultz Memorial International	(United States) Colorado Springs, Colorado
Win	3-1	(United States) Robert Kokesh	Fall	January 28–30, 2016	2016 Dave Schultz Memorial International	(United States) Colorado Springs, Colorado
Loss	2-1	(United States) Dillon Cowan	TF 3-11	January 28–30, 2016	2016 Dave Schultz Memorial International	(United States) Colorado Springs, Colorado
Win	2-0	(United States) Barrett Stanghill	Fall	January 28–30, 2016	2016 Dave Schultz Memorial International	(United States) Colorado Springs, Colorado
Win	1-0	(Panama) Alvis Almendra	Fall	January 28–30, 2016	2016 Dave Schultz Memorial International	(United States) Colorado Springs, Colorado

== Awards and honors ==
- 2019
  - (silver) Pan American Championships (77 kg)
  - (gold) US Nationals (77 kg)
  - (silver) US World Team Trials (77 kg)
  - (gold) US Open (77 kg)
  2018
  - (gold) US World Team Trials (77 kg)
  - (gold) US Open (77 kg)
  2017
  - (gold) US U23 World Team Trials (80 kg)
  - (silver) US World Team Trials (75 kg)
  - (silver) US Open (75 kg)
