= Amin Kavianinejad =

Iranian Greco-Roman wrestler

Amin Kaviyaninejad
Personal information
- Native name: امین کاویانی‌نژاد
- Full name: Amin Yavar Kaviyaninejad
- Born: 22 November 1998 (age 27) Andimeshk, Iran
- Height: 1.73 m (5 ft 8 in)
- Weight: 77 kg (170 lb)

Sport
- Country: Iran
- Sport: Greco-Roman
- Event: 77 kg
Medal record
Men's Greco-Roman wrestling
Representing Iran
Asian Games
Silver medal – second place	2022 Hangzhou	77 kg
Asian Championships
Gold medal – first place	2020 New Delhi	72 kg
Silver medal – second place	2023 Astana	77 kg
Bronze medal – third place	2021 Almaty	72 kg
Islamic Solidarity Games
Bronze medal – third place	2021 Konya	77 kg
Vehbi Emre & Hamit Kaplan Tournament
Gold medal – first place	2019 Istanbul	72 kg
Gold medal – first place	2024 Antalya	77 kg
Bronze medal – third place	2021 Istanbul	72 kg
Grand Prix
Silver medal – second place	2021 Kyiv	77 kg
Silver medal – second place	2023 Rome	77 kg
Bronze medal – third place	2023 Zagreb	77 kg
World U23 Championships
Bronze medal – third place	2017 Bydgoszcz	66 kg
Asian U23 Championship
Gold medal – first place	2019 Ulaanbaatar	77 kg
World Juniors Championships
Gold medal – first place	2017 Tampere	66 kg
Gold medal – first place	2018 Trnava	72 kg
Asian Juniors Championships
Gold medal – first place	2017 Taichung	66 kg
Gold medal – first place	2018 New Delhi	72 kg
World Cadets Championships
Gold medal – first place	2015 Sarajevo	58 kg
Asian Cadets Championships
Bronze medal – third place	2015 New Delhi	58 kg

Amin Kavianinejad (Persian: امین کاویانی‌نژاد; born 22 November 1998) is an Iranian Greco-Roman wrestler competing in the 77 kg division.

== Career ==
2017 World Junior Wrestling Championships in the 66 kg category, Amin Kavianinejad defeated Manish of India 9–0 in the first round. He won the second round against Bek konorbayev of Kyrgyzstan with a score of 2–1. Kavianinejad defeated Shogo Takahashi of Japan 4–2 in the third round and in the quarterfinals to advance to the semi-finals. He lost 5–2 to Alan Mirzoyan of Russia and qualified for the match. Kaviani defeated Abila Khan amziev of Kazakhstan 5–1 in the match and won the bronze medal.

At the 2020 Asian Championships, in the 72 kg category, Amin Kavianinejad defeated Chen Yan-kai of Chinese Taipei 8–0 in the second round after in the first round to advance to the semi-finals. He defeated Ruslan Tsarev of Kyrgyzstan 3-0 and made his way to the final. Kavianinejad defeated Ibragim Magomadov of Kazakhstan 8–0 in the final to win the gold medal.

At the 2021 Asian Championships, in the 72 kg category, Amin Kavianinejad won the second round against Azat Sadikov of Kazakhstan 8–6 after resting in the first round. He defeated Asian champion Ruslan Tsarev of Kyrgyzstan 3–1 in the next round and in the semifinal stage and went to the qualifying round. He defeated Makhmud Bakhshilloev of Uzbekistan 2–1 to win the bronze medal.

At the 2022 Asian Games, in the 77 kg category, Amin Kavianinejad defeated Kim Hyun-Woo of South Korea 9–3 in the first round. He defeated Dilshad amangaldiev of Uzbekistan 5–3 in the next round and advanced to the semifinals. He passed the Liu Roy dam from China with a score of 1-1 and made it to the final. Kavianinejad fought World Champion and Olympic vice-champion Akzhol Makhmudov from Kyrgyzstan in the final stage, who eventually won the silver medal by defeating this famous opponent.

He competed at the 2024 Asian Wrestling Olympic Qualification Tournament in Bishkek, Kyrgyzstan and he earned a quota place for Iran for the 2024 Summer Olympics in Paris, France. He competed in the 77 kg event at the Olympics.
