= 2025 World Wrestling Championships – Men's Greco-Roman 82 kg =

Wrestling competitions

Men's Greco-Roman 82 kg at the 2025 World Championships
- Venue: Arena Zagreb
- Dates: 18–19 September 2025
- Competitors: 26 from 25 nations

Medalists
gold medal	Gholamreza Farrokhi	Iran
silver medal	Gela Bolkvadze	Georgia
bronze medal	Karlo Kodrić	Croatia
bronze medal	Taizo Yoshida	Japan

The men's Greco-Roman 82 kilograms is a competition featured at the 2025 World Wrestling Championships, and was held in Zagreb, Croatia on 18 and 19 September 2025.

This Greco-Roman wrestling competition consists of a single-elimination tournament, with a repechage used to determine the winner of two bronze medals. The two finalists face off for gold and silver medals. Each wrestler who loses to one of the two finalists moves into the repechage, culminating in a pair of bronze medal matches, featuring the semifinal losers each facing the remaining repechage opponent from their half of the bracket.

== Results ==
Legend

- C — Won by 3 cautions given to the opponent
- F — Won by fall

=== Final ===
Final
Gholamreza Farrokhi (IRI)	4
Gela Bolkvadze (GEO)	0

=== Top half ===
Round of 32
Li Qingzhe (CHN)	0
Gholamreza Farrokhi (IRI)	9
Diego Macías (MEX)	10
Marek Vrba (CZE)	5
Ibrahim Tabaev (BEL)	5
Ramon Betschart (SUI)	8
Bekzat Orunkul Uulu (KGZ)	9
Gabe Dinette (PHI)	0
Almir Tolebayev (KAZ)	7
Rahul Badshra (IND)	1

Round of 16
Erik Szilvássy (HUN)	0
Gholamreza Farrokhi (IRI)	8
Diego Macías (MEX)	0
Ramon Betschart (SUI)	9
Karlo Kodrić (CRO)	5
Bekzat Orunkul Uulu (KGZ)	0
Almir Tolebayev (KAZ)	4
Mihail Bradu (MDA)	9

Quarterfinals
Gholamreza Farrokhi (IRI)	9
Ramon Betschart (SUI)	0
Karlo Kodrić (CRO)	4
Mihail Bradu (MDA)	2

Semifinals
Gholamreza Farrokhi (IRI)	7
Karlo Kodrić (CRO)	1

=== Bottom half ===
Round of 32
Shahin Badaghi (QAT)	6
Beka Melelashvili (USA)	4
Alperen Berber (TUR)	1
Alexander Johansson (SWE)	2
Jalgasbay Berdimuratov (UZB)	6^{F}
Sun Won-jong (KOR)	0
Adlet Tiuliubaev (UWW)	12
Samvel Grigoryan (ARM)	3
Ruslan Abdiiev (UKR)	5
Luca Dariozzi (ITA)	1

Round of 16
Gurban Gurbanov (AZE)	1
Shahin Badaghi (QAT)	1
Alexander Johansson (SWE)	5
Taizo Yoshida (JPN)	6
Jalgasbay Berdimuratov (UZB)	2
Adlet Tiuliubaev (UWW)	3
Ruslan Abdiiev (UKR)	1
Gela Bolkvadze (GEO)	6

Quarterfinals
Gurban Gurbanov (AZE)	8
Taizo Yoshida (JPN)	9^{C}
Adlet Tiuliubaev (UWW)	4
Gela Bolkvadze (GEO)	5

Semifinals
Taizo Yoshida (JPN)	5
Gela Bolkvadze (GEO)	8

=== Repechage ===
Repechage round 1
Li Qingzhe (CHN)	1
Erik Szilvássy (HUN)	1

Repechage round 2
Erik Szilvássy (HUN)	0
Ramon Betschart (SUI)	5
Ruslan Abdiiev (UKR)	0
Adlet Tiuliubaev (UWW)	4

Bronze medals
Ramon Betschart (SUI)	0
Karlo Kodrić (CRO)	5
Adlet Tiuliubaev (UWW)	3
Taizo Yoshida (JPN)	3

== Final standing ==
Rank	Athlete
1st place, gold medalist(s)	Gholamreza Farrokhi (IRI)
2nd place, silver medalist(s)	Gela Bolkvadze (GEO)
3rd place, bronze medalist(s)	Karlo Kodrić (CRO)
3rd place, bronze medalist(s)	Taizo Yoshida (JPN)
5	Ramon Betschart (SUI)
5	Adlet Tiuliubaev (UWW)
7	Jalgasbay Berdimuratov (UZB)
8	Bekzat Orunkul Uulu (KGZ)
9	Mihail Bradu (MDA)
10	Almir Tolebayev (KAZ)
11	Shahin Badaghi (QAT)
12	Alexander Johansson (SWE)
13	Ruslan Abdiiev (UKR)
14	Diego Macías (MEX)
15	Gurban Gurbanov (AZE)
16	Erik Szilvássy (HUN)
17	Ibrahim Tabaev (BEL)
18	Marek Vrba (CZE)
19	Beka Melelashvili (USA)
20	Samvel Grigoryan (ARM)
21	Alperen Berber (TUR)
22	Luca Dariozzi (ITA)
23	Rahul Badshra (IND)
24	Li Qingzhe (CHN)
25	Sun Won-jong (KOR)
26	Gabe Dinette (PHI)
