= Wrestling at the 2024 Summer Olympics =

Wrestling at the Games of the XXXIII Olympiad
- Venue: Grand Palais Éphémère
- Dates: 5–11 August 2024
- No. of events: 18 (12 men, 6 women)
- Competitors: 290 from 60 nations

The wrestling competitions at the 2024 Summer Olympics in Paris were held from 5 to 11 August at Grand Palais Éphémère in Champ de Mars. 288 wrestlers competed across 18 weight categories at these Games. The men wrestled against each other in both freestyle and Greco-Roman events, whereas the women only participated in the freestyle wrestling, with 18 gold medals awarded. Wrestling has been contested at every modern Summer Olympic Games, except Paris 1900.

Mijaín López became the first and only athlete in modern Olympics history to win five consecutive gold medals in the same individual event after winning in the Greco-Roman wrestling 130 kg, Japan has topped the medal table for the fourth time.

== Competition format ==
Sixteen wrestlers compete in each division. The competition consists of a single-elimination tournament, with a repechage used to determine the winner of two bronze medals. The two finalists will wrestle for the gold and silver medals. Each wrestler losing to one of the two finalists moves into the repechage that culminates in a pair of bronze medal matches featuring the semifinal losers who each face the remaining repechage opponent from their half of the bracket.

== Qualification ==
Similar to the previous Games, 288 wrestling quota places were available through three competition phases for Paris 2024. Each NOC could only qualify one wrestler per weight class. No host country spots will be allocated in wrestling.

The qualification period began at the 2023 World Wrestling Championships, held from the 16 to 24 September in Belgrade, Serbia, where five quota places for each of the eighteen weight categories were awarded to four medalists (gold, silver, and two bronze) along with the champion of a bout between two losers from the bronze-medal matches. At the beginning of the 2024 season, four continental qualification tournaments (Asia, Europe, the Americas, and the joint Africa & Oceania) distributed a total of 144 spots to the top two finalists of each continent across eighteen weight categories. The remainder of the total quota were decided at the 2024 World Qualification Tournament, offering three quota places per weight category to the two highest-ranked wrestlers and the champion of a wrestle-off between two bronze medalists.

=== Azerbaijani qualification match fixing scandal ===
During the 2024 European Wrestling Olympic Qualification Tournament in Baku, Azerbaijan, Italian wrestler Frank Chamizo stated that he was offered a $300,000 bribe to lose to Azerbaijani wrestler Turan Bayramov, which Chamizo refused. After a controversial referee decision resulted in Bayramov winning on criteria, Chamizo accused the referee of match fixing. Two weeks after the tournament, the refereeing body that officiated the match were suspended by the UWW after two independent panels ruled the bout was scored incorrectly. However, the result cannot be changed after the winner is officially declared, due to a policy. Chamizo ended up qualified by ranking, due to several Olympic spots being redistributed after the denial of athletes from Russia and Belarus.

== Competition schedule ==
Legend
R16	Round of 16	¼	Quarter-finals	½	Semi-finals	R	Repechage	F	Final

Schedule
Event↓/Date →	Mon 5			Tue 6			Wed 7			Thu 8			Fri 9			Sat 10			Sun 11		
	M		E	M		E	M		E	M		E	M		E	M		E	M	E	
Men's Greco-Roman
Men's Greco-Roman 60 kg	R16	¼	½	R		F															
Men's Greco-Roman 67 kg							R16	¼	½	R		F									
Men's Greco-Roman 77 kg				R16	¼	½	R		F												
Men's Greco-Roman 87 kg							R16	¼	½	R		F									
Men's Greco-Roman 97 kg				R16	¼	½	R		F												
Men's Greco-Roman 130 kg	R16	¼	½	R		F															
Women's freestyle
Women's freestyle 50 kg				R16	¼	½	R		F												
Women's freestyle 53 kg							R16	¼	½	R		F									
Women's freestyle 57 kg										R16	¼	½	R		F						
Women's freestyle 62 kg													R16	¼	½	R		F			
Women's freestyle 68 kg	R16	¼	½	R		F															
Women's freestyle 76 kg																R16	¼	½		R	F
Men's freestyle
Men's freestyle 57 kg										R16	¼	½	R		F						
Men's freestyle 65 kg																R16	¼	½		R	F
Men's freestyle 74 kg													R16	¼	½	R		F			
Men's freestyle 86 kg										R16	¼	½	R		F						
Men's freestyle 97 kg																R16	¼	½		R	F
Men's freestyle 125 kg													R16	¼	½	R		F			

== Medal summary ==
=== Medal table ===
* Host nation (France)

Rank	Nation	Gold	Silver	Bronze	Total
1	Japan	8	1	2	11
2	Iran	2	4	2	8
3	United States	2	2	3	7
4	Bulgaria	2	0	0	2
5	Cuba	1	1	3	5
6	Georgia	1	1	0	2
7	Uzbekistan	1	0	1	2
8	Bahrain	1	0	0	1
9	Ukraine	0	2	1	3
10	China	0	1	4	5
10	Kyrgyzstan	0	1	4	5
12	Armenia	0	1	1	2
13	Chile	0	1	0	1
13	Ecuador	0	1	0	1
13	Kazakhstan	0	1	0	1
13	Moldova	0	1	0	1
17	Azerbaijan	0	0	3	3
18	Albania	0	0	2	2
18	North Korea	0	0	2	2
18	Turkey	0	0	2	2
21	Colombia	0	0	1	1
21	Denmark	0	0	1	1
21	Greece	0	0	1	1
21	India	0	0	1	1
21	Norway	0	0	1	1
21	Puerto Rico	0	0	1	1
Totals (26 entries)		18	18	36	72

=== Men's freestyle ===
Event	Gold	Silver	Bronze
57 kg	Rei Higuchi; Japan	Spencer Lee; United States	Aman Sehrawat; India
57 kg	Rei Higuchi; Japan	Spencer Lee; United States	Gulomjon Abdullaev; Uzbekistan
65 kg	Kotaro Kiyooka; Japan	Rahman Amouzad; Iran	Sebastian Rivera; Puerto Rico
65 kg	Kotaro Kiyooka; Japan	Rahman Amouzad; Iran	Islam Dudaev; Albania
74 kg	Razambek Zhamalov; Uzbekistan	Daichi Takatani; Japan	Kyle Dake; United States
74 kg	Razambek Zhamalov; Uzbekistan	Daichi Takatani; Japan	Chermen Valiev; Albania
86 kg	Magomed Ramazanov; Bulgaria	Hassan Yazdani; Iran	Aaron Brooks; United States
86 kg	Magomed Ramazanov; Bulgaria	Hassan Yazdani; Iran	Dauren Kurugliev; Greece
97 kg	Akhmed Tazhudinov; Bahrain	Givi Matcharashvili; Georgia	Magomedkhan Magomedov; Azerbaijan
97 kg	Akhmed Tazhudinov; Bahrain	Givi Matcharashvili; Georgia	Amir Ali Azarpira; Iran
125 kg	Geno Petriashvili; Georgia	Amir Hossein Zare; Iran	Taha Akgül; Turkey
125 kg	Geno Petriashvili; Georgia	Amir Hossein Zare; Iran	Giorgi Meshvildishvili; Azerbaijan

=== Women's freestyle ===
Event	Gold	Silver	Bronze
50 kg	Sarah Hildebrandt; United States	Yusneylys Guzmán; Cuba	Yui Susaki; Japan
50 kg	Sarah Hildebrandt; United States	Yusneylys Guzmán; Cuba	Feng Ziqi; China
53 kg	Akari Fujinami; Japan	Lucía Yépez; Ecuador	Choe Hyo-gyong; North Korea
53 kg	Akari Fujinami; Japan	Lucía Yépez; Ecuador	Pang Qianyu; China
57 kg	Tsugumi Sakurai; Japan	Anastasia Nichita; Moldova	Helen Maroulis; United States
57 kg	Tsugumi Sakurai; Japan	Anastasia Nichita; Moldova	Hong Kexin; China
62 kg	Sakura Motoki; Japan	Iryna Koliadenko; Ukraine	Aisuluu Tynybekova; Kyrgyzstan
62 kg	Sakura Motoki; Japan	Iryna Koliadenko; Ukraine	Grace Bullen; Norway
68 kg	Amit Elor; United States	Meerim Zhumanazarova; Kyrgyzstan	Buse Tosun Çavuşoğlu; Turkey
68 kg	Amit Elor; United States	Meerim Zhumanazarova; Kyrgyzstan	Nonoka Ozaki; Japan
76 kg	Yuka Kagami; Japan	Kennedy Blades; United States	Milaimys Marín; Cuba
76 kg	Yuka Kagami; Japan	Kennedy Blades; United States	Tatiana Rentería; Colombia

=== Men's Greco-Roman ===
Event	Gold	Silver	Bronze
60 kg	Kenichiro Fumita; Japan	Cao Liguo; China	Zholaman Sharshenbekov; Kyrgyzstan
60 kg	Kenichiro Fumita; Japan	Cao Liguo; China	Ri Se-ung; North Korea
67 kg	Saeid Esmaeili; Iran	Parviz Nasibov; Ukraine	Hasrat Jafarov; Azerbaijan
67 kg	Saeid Esmaeili; Iran	Parviz Nasibov; Ukraine	Luis Orta; Cuba
77 kg	Nao Kusaka; Japan	Demeu Zhadrayev; Kazakhstan	Malkhas Amoyan; Armenia
77 kg	Nao Kusaka; Japan	Demeu Zhadrayev; Kazakhstan	Akzhol Makhmudov; Kyrgyzstan
87 kg	Semen Novikov; Bulgaria	Alireza Mohmadi; Iran	Zhan Beleniuk; Ukraine
87 kg	Semen Novikov; Bulgaria	Alireza Mohmadi; Iran	Turpal Bisultanov; Denmark
97 kg	Mohammad Hadi Saravi; Iran	Artur Aleksanyan; Armenia	Gabriel Rosillo; Cuba
97 kg	Mohammad Hadi Saravi; Iran	Artur Aleksanyan; Armenia	Uzur Dzhuzupbekov; Kyrgyzstan
130 kg	Mijaín López; Cuba	Yasmani Acosta; Chile	Amin Mirzazadeh; Iran
130 kg	Mijaín López; Cuba	Yasmani Acosta; Chile	Meng Lingzhe; China

== Participating nations ==
There are 60 participating nations:

- Albania (3)
- Algeria (8)
- Armenia (5)
- Australia (2)
- Azerbaijan (12)
- Bahrain (1)
- Brazil (1)
- Bulgaria (6)
- Canada (6)
- Chile (2)
- China (13)
- Colombia (4)
- Cuba (10)
- Denmark (1)
- Dominican Republic (1)
- Ecuador (4)
- Egypt (11)
- Estonia (1)
- Finland (2)
- France (3)
- Georgia (7)
- Germany (7)
- Greece (2)
- Guam (2)
- Guinea-Bissau (2)
- Honduras (1)
- Hungary (5)
- India (6)
- Individual Neutral Athletes (2)
- Iran (12)
- Italy (2)
- Japan (13)
- Kazakhstan (8)
- Kyrgyzstan (10)
- Lithuania (3)
- Mexico (2)
- Moldova (8)
- Mongolia (9)
- Morocco (1)
- New Zealand (1)
- Nigeria (6)
- North Korea (5)
- North Macedonia (1)
- Norway (1)
- Poland (5)
- Puerto Rico (4)
- Refugee Olympic Team (2)
- Romania (5)
- Samoa (1)
- San Marino (1)
- Serbia (5)
- Slovakia (1)
- South Africa (1)
- South Korea (2)
- Sweden (2)
- Tajikistan (1)
- Tunisia (4)
- Turkey (11)
- Ukraine (9)
- United States (16)
- Uzbekistan (7)
- Venezuela (4)
