= Nao Kusaka =

Japanese Greco-Roman wrestler (born 2000)

Personal information
- Native name: 日下尚
- Born: 20 November 2000 (age 25) Takamatsu, Kagawa, Japan
- Height: 1.78 m (5 ft 10 in)
- Weight: 77 kg (170 lb)

Sport
- Country: Japan
- Sport: Greco-Roman
- Event: 77 kg
Medal record
Men's Greco-Roman wrestling
Representing Japan
Olympic Games
Gold medal – first place	2024 Paris	77 kg
World Championships
Silver medal – second place	2025 Zagreb	77 kg
Bronze medal – third place	2023 Belgrade	77 kg
Asian Games
Silver medal – second place	2026 Aichi–Nagoya	77 kg
Asian Championships
Gold medal – first place	2024 Bishkek	77 kg
Grand Prix
Bronze medal – third place	2024 Zagreb	77 kg
World U23 Championships
Bronze medal – third place	2022 Pontevedra	77 kg
Asian Juniors Championships
Bronze medal – third place	2018 New Delhi	72 kg
Bronze medal – third place	2019 Chon Buri	77 kg

Nao Kusaka (Japanese: 日下尚; born 20 November 2000) is a Japanese Greco-Roman wrestler competing in the 77 kg division. He won the gold medal in the 77 kg event at the 2024 Summer Olympics in Paris, France.

== Career ==
In 2017, Nao Kusaka finished fifth in the cadet world championships. A year later, he won bronze medals at the Asian junior championships and the Japanese senior championships.

In 2023, Nao Kusaka competed in the Greco-Roman 77 kg event at the 2023 World Wrestling Championships held in Belgrade, Serbia and won the bronze medal.

In 2024, Nao Kusaka competed in the Greco-Roman 77 kg event at the 2024 Asian Wrestling Championships held in Bishkek, Kyrgyzstan and won the gold medal.

== Achievements ==
Year	Tournament	Location	Result	Event
2023	World Championships	Belgrade, Serbia	3rd	Greco-Roman 77 kg
2024	Asian Championships	Bishkek, Kyrgyzstan	1st	Greco-Roman 77 kg
2024	Olympic Games	Paris, France	1st	Greco-Roman 77 kg
2025	World Championships	Zagreb, Croatia	2nd	Greco-Roman 77 kg
