= Wrestling at the 2022 Asian Games – Men's Greco-Roman 77 kg =

Men's Greco-Roman 77 kg at the 2022 Asian Games
- Venue: Lin'an Sports and Culture Centre
- Date: 4 October 2023
- Competitors: 11 from 11 nations

Medalists
gold medal	Akzhol Makhmudov	Kyrgyzstan
silver medal	Amin Kavianinejad	Iran
bronze medal	Azat Sadykov	Kazakhstan
bronze medal	Liu Rui	China

The men's Greco-Roman 77 kilograms wrestling competition at the 2022 Asian Games in Hangzhou was held on 4 October 2023 at the Lin'an Sports and Culture Centre.

This Greco-Roman wrestling competition consists of a single-elimination tournament, with a repechage used to determine the winner of two bronze medals. The two finalists face off for gold and silver medals. Each wrestler who loses to one of the two finalists moves into the repechage, culminating in a pair of bronze medal matches featuring the semifinal losers each facing the remaining repechage opponent from their half of the bracket.

== Schedule ==
All times are China Standard Time (UTC+08:00)

Date	Time	Event
Wednesday, 4 October 2023	10:00	1/8 finals
Wednesday, 4 October 2023	10:00	1/4 finals
Wednesday, 4 October 2023	10:00	Semifinals
Wednesday, 4 October 2023	10:00	Repechages
Wednesday, 4 October 2023	17:00	Finals

== Results ==
Legend

- F — Won by fall
- WO — Won by walkover

=== Main bracket ===
1/8 finals
Kodai Sakuraba (JPN)	0
Azat Sadykov (KAZ)	6
Kim Hyeon-woo (KOR)	3
Amin Kavianinejad (IRI)	9
Andika Sulaeman (INA)	0
Liu Rui (CHN)	4^{F}

1/4 finals
Wisit Thamwirat (THA)	0
Azat Sadykov (KAZ)	8
Keo Sophak (CAM)	0
Akzhol Makhmudov (KGZ)	4^{F}
Dilshod Omongeldiyev (UZB)	3
Amin Kavianinejad (IRI)	5
Liu Rui (CHN)	9
Vikas Dalal (IND)	1

Semifinals
Azat Sadykov (KAZ)	0
Akzhol Makhmudov (KGZ)	9
Amin Kavianinejad (IRI)	1
Liu Rui (CHN)	1

Gold medal match
Akzhol Makhmudov (KGZ)	1
Amin Kavianinejad (IRI)	1

=== Repechage ===
Repechage round 1
Kim Hyeon-woo (KOR)	6
Dilshod Omongeldiyev (UZB)	3

Bronze medal matches
Keo Sophak (CAM)
Azat Sadykov (KAZ)	WO
Kim Hyeon-woo (KOR)	3
Liu Rui (CHN)	5

== Final standing ==
Rank	Athlete
1st place, gold medalist(s)	Akzhol Makhmudov (KGZ)
2nd place, silver medalist(s)	Amin Kavianinejad (IRI)
3rd place, bronze medalist(s)	Azat Sadykov (KAZ)
3rd place, bronze medalist(s)	Liu Rui (CHN)
5	Keo Sophak (CAM)
5	Kim Hyeon-woo (KOR)
7	Dilshod Omongeldiyev (UZB)
8	Vikas Dalal (IND)
9	Andika Sulaeman (INA)
10	Kodai Sakuraba (JPN)
11	Wisit Thamwirat (THA)
