= Yosvanys Peña =

Cuban Greco-Roman wrestler

Personal information
- Full name: Yosvanys Peña Flores
- Born: 24 December 1993 (age 32)

Sport
- Country: Cuba
- Sport: Amateur wrestling
- Weight class: 77 kg
- Event: Greco-Roman
Medal record
Men's Greco-Roman wrestling
Representing Cuba
Pan American Games
Bronze medal – third place	2019 Lima	77 kg
Bronze medal – third place	2023 Santiago	77 kg
Pan American Championships
Gold medal – first place	2019 Buenos Aires	77 kg
Gold medal – first place	2020 Ottawa	77 kg
Gold medal – first place	2022 Acapulco	77 kg

Yosvanys Peña Flores (born 24 December 1993) is a Cuban Greco-Roman wrestler. At the Pan American Wrestling Championships he won the gold medal in the 77 kg event both in 2019 and in 2020. He also represented Cuba at the 2020 Summer Olympics in Tokyo, Japan and the 2024 Summer Olympics in Paris, France.

== Career ==
In 2010, Peña won the silver medal in the boys' Greco-Roman 42 kg event at the Summer Youth Olympics held in Singapore. In the final, he lost against Murad Bazarov of Azerbaijan.

In March 2020, Peña qualified at the Pan American Olympic Qualification Tournament held in Ottawa, Canada to represent Cuba at the 2020 Summer Olympics. He competed in the 77 kg event at the 2020 Summer Olympics held in Tokyo, Japan. He was eliminated in his first match.

He competed in the 77 kg event at the 2022 World Wrestling Championships held in Belgrade, Serbia. He was eliminated in his first match.

Peña won a bronze medal in his event at the 2024 Pan American Wrestling Championships held in Acapulco, Mexico. A few days later, at the Pan American Wrestling Olympic Qualification Tournament held in Acapulco, Mexico, he earned a quota place for Cuba for the 2024 Summer Olympics held in Paris, France. He competed in the 77 kg event at the Olympics where he was eliminated in his first match.

== Achievements ==
Year	Tournament	Location	Result	Event
2019	Pan American Wrestling Championships	Buenos Aires, Argentina	1st	Greco-Roman 77 kg
2019	Pan American Games	Lima, Peru	3rd	Greco-Roman 77 kg
2020	Pan American Wrestling Championships	Ottawa, Canada	1st	Greco-Roman 77 kg
2022	Pan American Wrestling Championships	Acapulco, Mexico	1st	Greco-Roman 77 kg
2023	Pan American Games	Santiago, Chile	3rd	Greco-Roman 77 kg
