= Wrestling at the 2024 Summer Olympics – Men's Greco-Roman 77 kg =

Men's Greco-Roman 77 kg at the Games of the XXXIII Olympiad
- Venue: Grand Palais Éphémère
- Date: 6–7 August 2024
- Competitors: 16 from 16 nations

Medalists
1st place, gold medalist(s)		Nao Kusaka	Japan
2nd place, silver medalist(s)		Demeu Zhadrayev	Kazakhstan
3rd place, bronze medalist(s)		Malkhas Amoyan	Armenia
3rd place, bronze medalist(s)		Akzhol Makhmudov	Kyrgyzstan

Men's Greco-Roman 77 kg competition at the 2024 Summer Olympics in Paris, France, took place on 6–7 August 2024 at the Grand Palais Éphémère in Champ de Mars.

== Background ==
This is the 22nd appearance of Greco-Roman welterweight event, this event made debut in 1932 and it has appeared in every games since then.

- 1932-1936: 72kg
- 1948-60: 73 kg
- 1964-1968: 78kg
- 1972-1996: 74kg
- 2000: 76kg
- 2004-2012: 74kg
- 2016: 75kg
- 2020-current: 77kg

Nao Kusaka won the event and became a champion by defeating Demeu Zhadrayev in the final, returned 2020 silver medalist Akjol Mahmudov and Malkhas Amoyan won the bronze medals with Mahmudov going through repechage.

== Format ==
This Greco-Roman competition consists of a single-elimination tournament, with a repechage used to determine the winner of two bronze medals. The two finalists face off for gold and silver medals. Each wrestler who loses to one of the two finalists moves into the repechage, culminating in a pair of bronze medal matches featuring the semifinal losers each facing the remaining repechage opponent from their half of the bracket.

== Rules ==
A typical bout consists of two halves of three minutes each separated by a 30-second break. The two competitors compete on a mat, which is nine meters in diameter. Wrestlers try to score points by executing various legal maneuvers. Points ranging from one to five are awarded by the mat referee depending on the degree of difficulty of the maneuvers. Points are also awarded to the opponent in case of infractions such as illegal holds, passivity etc. A wrestler is automatically disqualified if three cautions are awarded during a bout. Forcing an opponent's shoulders to the mat results in an instant victory by fall.

During the course of a match, if a wrestler builds a 10-point advantage over the opponent, the bout is stopped and the leader is declared as the winner by technical superiority. The total scores are totaled at the end of the stipulated six-minute period, and the wrestler with the maximum points wins. In case of a tie, the wrestler who has scored the last point is declared the winner. A competitor might also be declared a winner if the opponent does not turn up or is medically unfit to compete.

== Qualification ==
Sixteen quota places were available with each nation restricted to a maximum of one spot. Five quota places were awarded at the 2023 World Wrestling Championships, which took place from the 16th to 24th of September in Belgrade, Serbia. The finalists of each category in the four continental qualification tournaments (Asia, Europe, the Americas, and the joint Africa & Oceania) were awarded quota places. The remainder of the total quota was allocated at the 2024 World Wrestling Olympic Qualification Tournament, offering a minimum of three quota places.

== Schedule ==
All times are Central European Time (UTC+02:00)

Date	Time	Event
6 August 2024	11:00	Qualification rounds
6 August 2024	18:15	Semifinals
7 August 2024	11:00	Repechage
7 August 2024	18:15	Finals

== Results ==
Sixteen athletes qualified for the competition.

Legend

- F — Won by fall

=== Main bracket ===
Round of 16
Nao Kusaka (JPN)	9
Abdelkrim Ouakali (ALG)	0
Mahmoud Abdelrahman (EGY)	0
Aram Vardanyan (UZB)	9
Yosvanys Peña (CUB)	1
Amin Kavianinejad (IRI)	1
Jonni Sarkkinen (FIN)	0
Malkhas Amoyan (ARM)	8
Akzhol Makhmudov (KGZ)	4
Kamal Bey (USA)	1
Jair Cuero (COL)	0
Demeu Zhadrayev (KAZ)	9
Zoltán Lévai (HUN)	2
Burhan Akbudak (TUR)	1
Aik Mnatsakanian (BUL)	0
Sanan Suleymanov (AZE)	2

Quarterfinals
Nao Kusaka (JPN)	12
Aram Vardanyan (UZB)	2
Amin Kavianinejad (IRI)	0
Malkhas Amoyan (ARM)	3
Akzhol Makhmudov (KGZ)	1
Demeu Zhadrayev (KAZ)	3
Zoltán Lévai (HUN)	1
Sanan Suleymanov (AZE)	1

Semifinals
Nao Kusaka (JPN)	3
Malkhas Amoyan (ARM)	1
Demeu Zhadrayev (KAZ)	6
Sanan Suleymanov (AZE)	1

Final
Nao Kusaka (JPN)	5
Demeu Zhadrayev (KAZ)	2

=== Repechage ===
Repechage
Abdelkrim Ouakali (ALG)	0
Aram Vardanyan (UZB)	11
Jair Cuero (COL)	0
Akzhol Makhmudov (KGZ)	9

Bronze medal matches
Aram Vardanyan (UZB)	5
Malkhas Amoyan (ARM)	6
Akzhol Makhmudov (KGZ)	6
Sanan Suleymanov (AZE)	5

== Final standing ==
Rank	Athlete
1st place, gold medalist(s)	Nao Kusaka (JPN)
2nd place, silver medalist(s)	Demeu Zhadrayev (KAZ)
3rd place, bronze medalist(s)	Malkhas Amoyan (ARM)
3rd place, bronze medalist(s)	Akzhol Makhmudov (KGZ)
5	Aram Vardanyan (UZB)
5	Sanan Suleymanov (AZE)
7	Zoltán Lévai (HUN)
8	Amin Kavianinejad (IRI)
9	Yosvanys Peña (CUB)
10	Burhan Akbudak (TUR)
11	Kamal Bey (USA)
12	Aik Mnatsakanian (BUL)
13	Jonni Sarkkinen (FIN)
14	Mahmoud Abdelrahman (EGY)
15	Jair Cuero (COL)
16	Abdelkrim Ouakali (ALG)
