= Wuileixis Rivas =

Venezuelan Greco-Roman wrestler

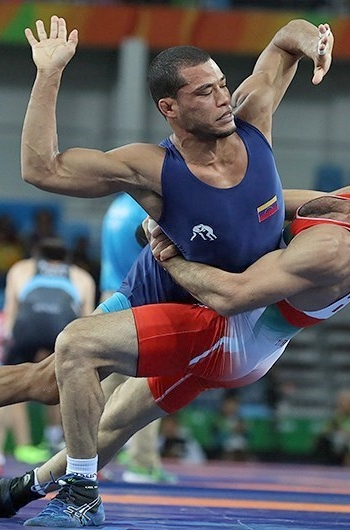
- Rivas at the 2016 Olympics

Personal information
- Full name: Wuileixis de Jesus Rivas Espinoza
- Nationality: Venezuela
- Born: 27 August 1980 (age 46) Caracas, Venezuela
- Height: 1.74 m (5 ft 8 1/2 in)
- Weight: 66 kg (146 lb)

Sport
- Sport: Wrestling
- Event: Greco-Roman
- Club: Naguanagua
- Coached by: Hector Chirinos
Medal record
Representing Venezuela
Pan American Games
Gold medal – first place	2015 Toronto	Men's -66kg
Silver medal – second place	2019 Lima	Men's 77kg

Wuileixis de Jesus Rivas Espinoza (born 27 August 1990 in Caracas, Capital District) is a Greco-Roman wrestler from Venezuela who competes in the welterweight category (under 66 kg). At the 2012 Olympics he received a bye for the preliminary round of sixteen match, before losing to French wrestler and defending Olympic champion Steeve Guénot, who was able to score one point each in two straight periods, leaving Rivas without a single point. At the 2016 Rio Games he was also eliminated in the first bout, against Omid Norouzi who was the defending champion from London.

He won the bronze medal in his event at the 2022 South American Games held in Asunción, Paraguay.

In 2024, he competed at the Pan American Wrestling Olympic Qualification Tournament held in Acapulco, Mexico hoping to qualify for the 2024 Summer Olympics in Paris, France. He was eliminated in his second match.
