= Akzhol Makhmudov =

Kyrgyz Greco-Roman wrestler

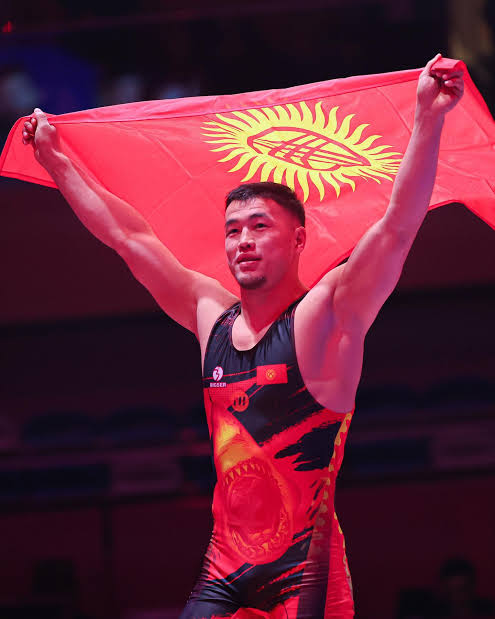
- Makhmudov at the 2022 World Championships

Personal information
- Native name: Акжол Махамаджанович Махмудов
- Full name: Akzhol Makhamadzhanovich Makhmudov
- Nationality: Kyrgyzstan
- Born: 15 April 1999 (age 27) Kurshab, Osh, Kyrgyz Republic
- Home town: Bishkek, Kyrgyz Republic
- Height: 175 cm (5 ft 9 in)

Sport
- Country: Kyrgyzstan
- Sport: Greco-Roman wrestling
- Weight class: 77 kg
- Rank: Master of Sport
- Event: Greco-Roman
- Coached by: Azat Erkimbayev (national); Meirambek Akhmetov (personal)
Medal record
Event	1st	2nd	3rd
Olympic Games	0	1	1
World Championships	2	0	1
Asian Championships	4	1	0
Asian Games	1	1	1
Other	8	1	1
Total	15	4	4
Men's Greco-Roman wrestling
Representing Kyrgyzstan
Olympic Games
Silver medal – second place	2020 Tokyo	77 kg
Bronze medal – third place	2024 Paris	77 kg
World Championships
Gold medal – first place	2022 Belgrade	77 kg
Gold medal – first place	2023 Belgrade	77 kg
Bronze medal – third place	2026 Astana	82 kg
Asian Games
Gold medal – first place	2022 Hangzhou	77 kg
Silver medal – second place	2018 Jakarta	77 kg
Bronze medal – third place	2026 Aichi–Nagoya	77 kg
Asian Championships
Gold medal – first place	2018 Bishkek	72 kg
Gold medal – first place	2022 Ulaanbaatar	77 kg
Gold medal – first place	2023 Astana	77 kg
Gold medal – first place	2026 Bishkek	77 kg
Silver medal – second place	2024 Bishkek	77 kg
Islamic Solidarity Games
Gold medal – first place	2021 Konya	77 kg
Gold medal – first place	2025 Riyadh	77 kg
Olympic Qualification Tournament
Gold medal – first place	2021 Almaty	77 kg
Dan Kolov - Nikola Petrov Tournament
Gold medal – first place	2023 Sofia	77 kg
Junior World Championships
Silver medal – second place	2017 Tampere	74 kg
Bronze medal – third place	2018 Trnava	77 kg
Junior Asian Championships
Gold medal – first place	2017 Taichung	74 kg
Cadet World Championships
Gold medal – first place	2016 Tbilisi	69 kg
Cadet Asian Championships
Gold medal – first place	2016 Taichung	69 kg
Gold medal – first place	2015 New Delhi	58 kg

Akzhol Makhamadzhanovich Makhmudov (Kyrgyz: Акжол Махамаджанович Махмудов; born 15 April 1999) is a Kyrgyz Greco-Roman wrestler. He won the silver medal in 77 kg event at the 2020 Summer Olympics in Tokyo, Japan. He won a gold medal at the 2022 World Championships, becoming Kyrgyzstan's first ever Greco-Roman World champion. Makhmudov repeated his success a year later at the 2023 World Championships, and won another gold medal- becoming a two-time World champion.

== Wrestling career ==
=== Until senior level ===
Makhmudov took up wrestling aged six, following his two elder brothers Beksultan Makhmudov and Syimyk Makhmudov. He later won two Asian cadet championships and the 2017 Junior Asian championships. Makhmudov also became the cadet world champion in 2016, and won a silver medal at the 2017 Junior World Championships in Tampere.

=== 2018 ===
In 2018, Makhmudov had his first senior level tournament when he entered the Kyrgyzstan National Wrestling Championships. He won the 77 kg division, and was included to the senior national team.

At the 2018 Asian Championships, Makhmudov competed in the 72 kg category, and won Ahmad Mahmoud Dashan (12–2), then Kuldeep Malik (8–0) and Tomohiro Inoue (7–0). In the final he faced the 2017 World Wrestling Championships silver medalist Demeu Zhadrayev. He won 8–6, becoming the youngest ever wrestler from Kyrgyzstan to earn a gold medal at senior level at the Asian Championships.

At the 2018 Asian Games, Makhmudov moved back to the 77 kg division and reached the final, where he lost to Mohammadali Geraei.

At the 2018 Junior World Championships, he lost to Islam Opiev of Russia in the quarter-final but went on to wrestle in the repechage stage and won a bronze medal against Kamal Bey of the US in their rematch of the Junior World Championships final.

== 2020 Olympic Games ==
Due to the pandemic, the 2020 Summer Olympic Games were postponed from their originally scheduled 2020 start date, to the Summer of 2021. Missing out on Olympic Qualification, Makhmudov had to wrestle at the Asian Olympic Qualification Tournament in Almaty, Kazakhstan. Makhmudov won all three of his matches and obtained gold, which awarded him Olympic qualification.

To start his first Olympic journey, Makhmudov defeated Tunisia's Lamjed Maafi by 11-0 technical superiority, a winner from the Africa and Oceania Wrestling Qualification tournament, he then defeated former two-time European Champion, Rafig Huseynov of Azerbaijan which won him a place in the semi-finals. Faced with 2-time European Championships and Games medallist, Armenian wrestler Karapet Chalyan, and beat his Armenian opponent 6–2 to advance him into the finals, opposite 2012 Olympic Silver medallist, and 2019 World champion, Hungary's Tamás Lőrincz. After a low-scoring six minutes, Lőrincz won the match 2–1, with Makhmudov leaving with a silver medal

== 2022 World Championships ==
Makhmudov returned to the mat at the 2022 Asian Wrestling Championships held in the Mongolian capital, Ulaanbaatar. Makhmudov won the gold medal by beating Maxat Yerezhepov in the final at 77 kg.

== 2024 Summer Olympics ==
He won one of the bronze medals in the 77 kg event at the 2024 Summer Olympics in Paris, France.

== Achievements ==
Year	Tournament	Venue	Result	Event
2018	Asian Championships	Bishkek, Kyrgyzstan	1st	Greco-Roman 72 kg
2018	Asian Games	Jakarta, Indonesia	2nd	Greco-Roman 77 kg
2021	Summer Olympics	Tokyo, Japan	2nd	Greco-Roman 77 kg
2022	Bolat Turlykhanov Cup	Almaty, Kazakhstan	1st	Greco-Roman 82 kg
2022	Asian Championships	Ulaanbaatar, Mongolia	1st	Greco-Roman 77 kg
2022	World Championships	Belgrade, Serbia	1st	Greco-Roman 77 kg
2023	Dan Kolov Nikola Petrov Tournament	Sofia, Bulgaria	1st	Greco-Roman 77 kg
2023	Asian Championships	Astana, Kazakhstan	1st	Greco-Roman 77 kg
2023	World Championships	Belgrade, Serbia	1st	Greco-Roman 77 kg
2023	Asian Games	Hangzhou, China	1st	Greco-Roman 77 kg
2024	Asian Championships	Bishkek, Kyrgyzstan	2nd	Greco-Roman 77 kg
2024	Summer Olympics	Paris, France	3rd	Greco-Roman 77 kg

== Personal life ==
Makhmudov is the third child in a family of a salesman. He currently studies at the Kyrgyz State Law Academy in Bishkek. He is said to originally be from the Nookat Region, Osh Oblast (Ноокатский район, Ошская область) in southern Kyrgyzstan. He enjoys playing billiards and tennis.

Makhmudov started wrestling in Osh. He moved to Bishkek in 6th grade and began training under Merited Master of Sport, Zhenish Satybaldiev. In 8th grade he began training at the Olympic reserve under coach, Meyrambek Akhmetov.
