= Demeu Zhadrayev =

Kazakh Greco-Roman wrestler

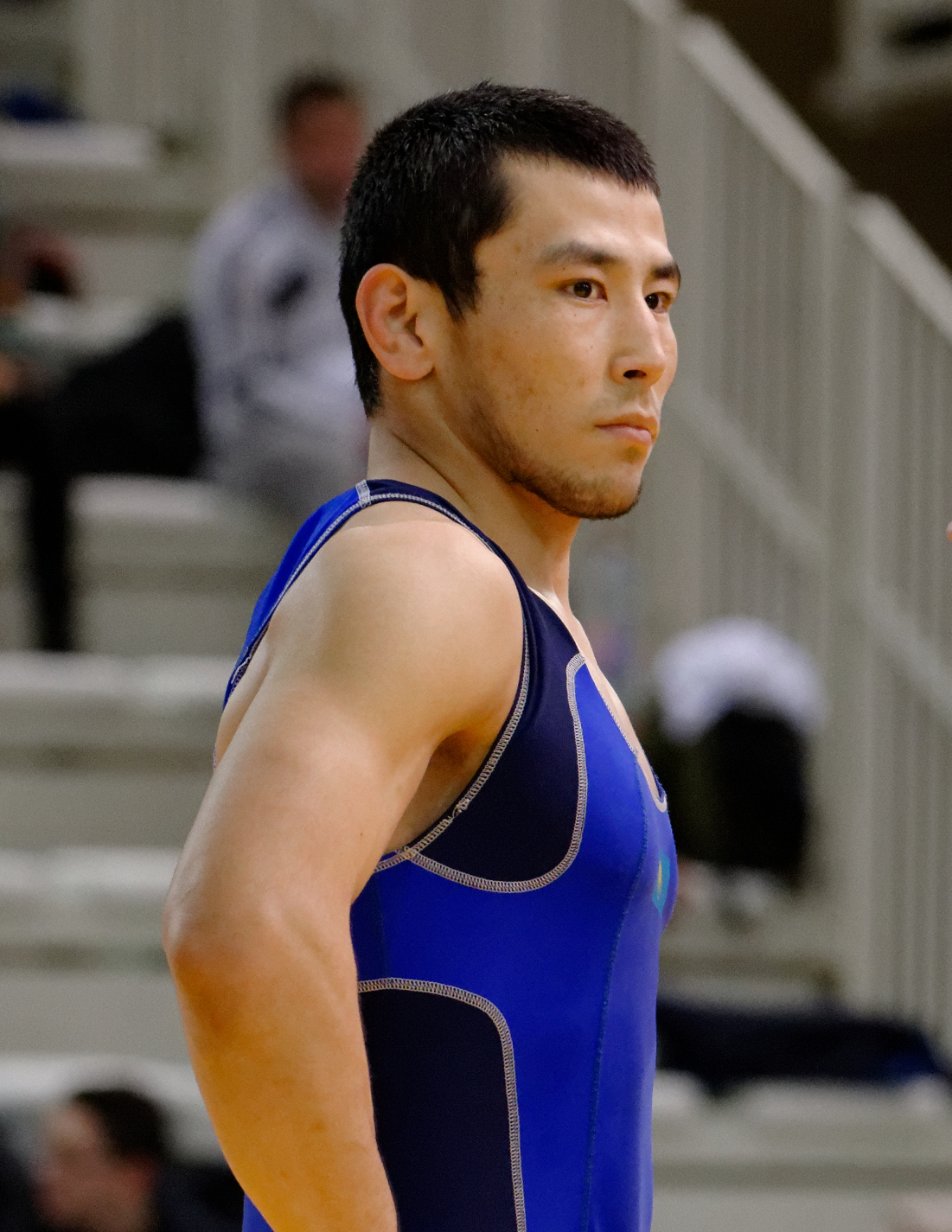
- Zhadrayev in 2014

Personal information
- Born: 2 November 1989 (age 36) Usharal, Kazakh SSR, Soviet Union
- Height: 174 cm (5 ft 9 in)

Sport
- Country: Kazakhstan
- Sport: Amateur wrestling
- Event: Greco-Roman
Medal record
Men's Greco-Roman wrestling
Representing Kazakhstan
Olympic Games
Silver medal – second place	2024 Paris	77 kg
World Championships
Silver medal – second place	2017 Paris	71 kg
Asian Championships
Silver medal – second place	2018 Bishkek	72 kg
Bronze medal – third place	2015 Doha	66 kg
Bronze medal – third place	2019 Xi'an	72 kg
Bronze medal – third place	2021 Almaty	77 kg

Demeu Zhadrayev (born 2 November 1989) is a Kazakh Greco-Roman wrestler. He won a silver medal at the 2024 Summer Olympics in Paris, France. Demeu also won the silver medal in the 71 kg event at the 2017 World Wrestling Championships held in Paris, France.

== Career ==
In 2018, Zhadrayev won the silver medal in the men's 72 kg event at the Asian Wrestling Championships in Bishkek, Kyrgyzstan. He also won a bronze medal, in different weight classes, at this event in 2015, 2019 and 2021.

Zhadrayev competed in the men's 77 kg event at the 2020 Summer Olympics held in Tokyo, Japan.

Zhadrayev competed at the 2024 Asian Wrestling Olympic Qualification Tournament in Bishkek, Kyrgyzstan and he earned a quota place for Kazakhstan for the 2024 Summer Olympics in Paris, France. He won the silver medal in the 77 kg event at the Olympics.
