= Wrestling at the 2024 Summer Olympics – Qualification =

This article details the qualifying phase for wrestling at the 2024 Summer Olympics. The competition at these Games comprises a total of 290 wrestlers coming from different nations; each is permitted to enter a maximum of eighteen wrestlers (one per weight category).

The qualification period began at the 2023 World Wrestling Championships, which took place from the 16th to 24th of September in Belgrade, Serbia, where five quota places for each of the eighteen weight categories will be awarded to the four medalists (gold, silver, and two bronze) and the champion of a bout between two losers from the bronze-medal matches. At the beginning of the 2024 season, four continental qualification tournaments (Asia, Europe, the Americas, and the joint Africa & Oceania) distributed a total of 144 spots to the top two finalists of each continent across eighteen weight categories. The remainder of the total quota was decided at the 2024 World Wrestling Olympic Qualification Tournament, offering three quota places per weight category to the two highest-ranked wrestlers and the champion of a wrestle-off between two bronze medalists. Two invitational places were granted to members of the Olympic Refugee Team.

Quota places are allocated to the respective NOC and not necessarily to the wrestlers in the qualification event.

== Timeline ==
Event	Date	Venue
2023 World Wrestling Championships	September 16–24, 2023	Belgrade, Serbia
Pan American Qualification Tournament	February 28 – March 1, 2024	Acapulco, Mexico
African & Oceania Qualification Tournament	March 22–24, 2024	Alexandria, Egypt
European Qualification Tournament	April 5–7, 2024	Baku, Azerbaijan
Asian Qualification Tournament	April 19–21, 2024	Bishkek, Kyrgyzstan
World Qualification Tournament	May 9–12, 2024	Istanbul, Turkey

== Qualification summary ==
NOC	Men's freestyle						Men's Greco-Roman						Women's freestyle						Total
NOC	57	65	74	86	97	125	60	67	77	87	97	130	50	53	57	62	68	76	Total
Albania	Yes	Yes	Yes																3
Algeria				Yes			Yes	Yes	Yes	Yes	Yes		Yes		Yes				8
Armenia	Yes	Yes						Yes	Yes		Yes								5
Australia		Yes		Yes															2
Azerbaijan	Yes	Yes	Yes	Yes	Yes	Yes	Yes	Yes	Yes	Yes		Yes	Yes						12
Bahrain					Yes														1
Brazil															Yes				1
Bulgaria				Yes					Yes	Yes		Yes				Yes		Yes	6
Canada				Yes		Yes									Yes	Yes	Yes	Yes	6
Chile								Yes				Yes							2
China	Yes		Yes		Yes	Yes	Yes			Yes		Yes	Yes	Yes	Yes	Yes	Yes	Yes	13
Colombia									Yes	Yes			Yes					Yes	4
Cuba		Yes	Yes		Yes		Yes	Yes	Yes		Yes	Yes	Yes					Yes	10
Czech Republic											Yes								1
Denmark										Yes									1
Dominican Republic					Yes														1
Ecuador								Yes						Yes	Yes			Yes	4
Egypt	Yes		Yes		Yes	Yes	Yes	Yes	Yes	Yes	Yes	Yes	Yes						11
Estonia												Yes							1
Finland									Yes		Yes								2
France								Yes								Yes	Yes		3
Georgia		Yes		Yes	Yes	Yes		Yes			Yes								6
Germany					Yes						Yes	Yes	Yes	Yes	Yes	Yes			7
Greece			Yes	Yes															2
Guam														Yes	Yes				2
Guinea-Bissau	Yes		Yes																2
Honduras											Yes								1
Hungary		Yes				Yes			Yes	Yes								Yes	5
India	Yes												Yes	Yes	Yes		Yes	Yes	6
Individual Neutral Athletes			Yes								Yes								1
Iran	Yes	Yes	Yes	Yes	Yes	Yes	Yes	Yes	Yes	Yes	Yes	Yes							12
Italy			Yes												Yes				2
Japan	Yes	Yes	Yes	Yes			Yes	Yes	Yes				Yes	Yes	Yes	Yes	Yes	Yes	13
Kazakhstan	Yes			Yes	Yes	Yes	Yes		Yes	Yes		Yes							8
Kyrgyzstan	Yes	Yes				Yes	Yes	Yes	Yes		Yes					Yes	Yes	Yes	10
Lithuania											Yes	Yes	Yes						3
Mexico	Yes	Yes																	2
Moldova		Yes			Yes		Yes	Yes						Yes	Yes	Yes	Yes		8
Mongolia		Yes		Yes		Yes							Yes	Yes	Yes	Yes	Yes	Yes	9
Morocco												Yes							1
New Zealand																	Yes		1
Nigeria						Yes								Yes	Yes	Yes	Yes	Yes	6
North Korea							Yes						Yes	Yes		Yes	Yes		5
North Macedonia	Yes																		1
Norway																Yes			1
Poland					Yes	Yes				Yes					Yes		Yes		5
Puerto Rico	Yes	Yes		Yes		Yes													4
Refugee Olympic Team			Yes				Yes												2
Romania							Yes			Yes		Yes		Yes		Yes		Yes	5
Samoa		Yes																	1
San Marino				Yes															1
Serbia			Yes				Yes	Yes		Yes									4
Slovakia			Yes																1
South Africa					Yes														1
South Korea											Yes	Yes							2
Sweden														Yes					1
Tajikistan			Yes																1
Tunisia								Yes				Yes				Yes		Yes	4
Turkey					Yes	Yes	Yes		Yes	Yes		Yes	Yes	Yes		Yes	Yes	Yes	11
Ukraine				Yes	Yes	Yes		Yes		Yes			Yes		Yes	Yes	Yes		9
United States	Yes	Yes	Yes	Yes	Yes	Yes			Yes	Yes	Yes	Yes	Yes	Yes	Yes	Yes	Yes	Yes	16
Uzbekistan	Yes		Yes	Yes			Yes		Yes		Yes		Yes						7
Venezuela			Yes				Yes							Yes			Yes		4
Total: 63 NOCs	16	16	18	16	16	16	17	16	16	16	16	16	16	16	16	16	16	16	291

== Men's freestyle events ==
=== 57 kg ===
Competition	Places	Qualified wrestlers
2023 World Championships	5	Rei Higuchi (JPN); Arsen Harutyunyan (ARM); Zelimkhan Abakarov (ALB); Meirambek Kartbay (KAZ) (Note: Zaur Uguev, Zaurbek Sidakov and Vanesa Kaladzinskaya originally earned their quota places through the 2023 World Championships, but all were rejected by the IOC. Their spots were reallocated to the next best eligible wrestlers.); Milad Valizadeh (IRI) (Note: Stevan Mićić originally won a quota at the 2023 championships, but Withdrawn due to injury, Serbia didn't replace him with another wrestler. The next best eligible wrestler from Iran took his spot instead.)
Pan American Qualification Tournament	2	Roman Bravo-Young (MEX); Darian Cruz (PUR)
African & Oceania Qualification Tournament	2	Gamal Mohamed (EGY); Diamantino Iuna Fafé (GBS)
European Qualification Tournament	2	Aliabbas Rzazade (AZE); Vladimir Egorov (MKD) (Note: Aryan Tsiutryn, Artur Naifonov, Alikhan Zhabrailov, Aliaksandr Hushtyn, Dzianis Khramiankou, Milad Alirzaev, Sergey Semenov, Nadezhda Sokolova, Natalia Malysheva, Iryna Kurachkina, Alina Kasabieva and Khanum Velieva originally earned their quota places through the 2024 European Olympic Qualification Tournament, but they were rejected by the IOC. Their spots were reallocated to the next best eligible wrestlers.)
Asian Qualification Tournament	2	Bekzat Almaz Uulu (KGZ); Gulomjon Abdullaev (UZB)
World Qualification Tournament	3	Spencer Lee (USA); Aman Sehrawat (IND); Zou Wanhao (CHN)
Total	16	

=== 65 kg ===
Competition	Places	Qualified wrestlers
2023 World Championships	5	Iszmail Muszukajev (HUN); Sebastian Rivera (PUR); Vazgen Tevanyan (ARM); Rahman Amouzad (IRI); Maxim Saculțan (MDA) (Note: Neutral athletes Shamil Mamedov and Abdulla Kurbanov originally earned their quota places through the 2023 World Championships, even thought they were approved by the IOC they declined the quota. Their spots were reallocated to the next best eligible wrestlers.)
Pan American Qualification Tournament	2	Austin Gómez (MEX); Alejandro Valdés (CUB)
African & Oceania Qualification Tournament	2	Gaku Akazawa (SAM); Georgii Okorokov (AUS)
European Qualification Tournament	2	Goderdzi Dzebisashvili (GEO); Haji Aliyev (AZE)
Asian Qualification Tournament	2	Kotaro Kiyooka (JPN); Ernazar Akmataliev (KGZ)
World Qualification Tournament	3	Islam Dudaev (ALB); Tömör-Ochiryn Tulga (MGL); Zain Retherford (USA)
Total	16	

=== 74 kg ===
Competition	Places	Qualified wrestlers
2023 World Championships	5	Kyle Dake (USA); Khetag Tsabolov (SRB); Daichi Takatani (JPN); Georgios Kougioumtsidis (GRE); Lu Feng (CHN)
Pan American Qualification Tournament	2	Geandry Garzón (CUB); Anthony Montero (VEN)
African & Oceania Qualification Tournament	2	Bacar Ndum (GBS); Amr Reda Hussen (EGY)
European Qualification Tournament	2+1	Turan Bayramov (AZE); Mahamedkhabib Kadzimahamedau (AIN) (Note: Mahamedkhabib Kadzimahamedau initially secured a quota place at the European Qualifier, but was rejected by the IOC. His spot was reallocated to the next best wrestler Frank Chamizo. Later IOC reverted its decision and let both wrestlers participate.); Frank Chamizo (ITA)
Asian Qualification Tournament	2	Bekzod Abdurakhmonov (UZB); Younes Emami (IRI)
World Qualification Tournament	3	Viktor Rassadin (TJK); Tajmuraz Salkazanov (SVK); Chermen Valiev (ALB)
Special Invitation	1	Iman Mahdavi (EOR)
Total	18	

=== 86 kg ===
Competition	Places	Qualified wrestlers
2023 World Championships	5	David Taylor (USA); Hassan Yazdani (IRI); Myles Amine (SMR); Azamat Dauletbekov (KAZ); Javrail Shapiev (UZB)
Pan American Qualification Tournament	2	Ethan Ramos (PUR); Alex Moore (CAN)
African & Oceania Qualification Tournament	2	Jayden Lawrence (AUS); Fateh Benferdjallah (ALG)
European Qualification Tournament	2	Osman Nurmagomedov (AZE); Vasyl Mykhailov (UKR)
Asian Qualification Tournament	2	Hayato Ishiguro (JPN); Byambasürengiin Bat-Erdene (MGL)
World Qualification Tournament	3	Dauren Kurugliev (GRE); Magomed Ramazanov (BUL); Vladimeri Gamkrelidze (GEO)
Total	16	

=== 97 kg ===
Competition	Places	Qualified wrestlers
2023 World Championships	5	Akhmed Tazhudinov (BRN); Magomedkhan Magomedov (AZE); Kyle Snyder (USA); Givi Matcharashvili (GEO); İbrahim Çiftçi (TUR)
Pan American Qualification Tournament	2	Luis Miguel Pérez (DOM); Arturo Silot (CUB)
African & Oceania Qualification Tournament	2	Mostafa El-Ders (EGY); Steyn de Lange (RSA)
European Qualification Tournament	2	Illia Archaia (UKR); Radu Lefter (MDA)
Asian Qualification Tournament	2	Alisher Yergali (KAZ); Amir Ali Azarpira (IRI)
World Qualification Tournament	3	Erik Thiele (GER); Zbigniew Baranowski (POL); Habila Awusayiman (CHN)
Total	16	

=== 125 kg ===
Competition	Places	Qualified wrestlers
2023 World Championships	5	Amir Hossein Zare (IRI); Geno Petriashvili (GEO); Taha Akgül (TUR); Mason Parris (USA); Oleksandr Khotsianivskyi (UKR)
Pan American Qualification Tournament	2	Jonovan Smith (PUR); Amar Dhesi (CAN)
African & Oceania Qualification Tournament	2	Ashton Mutuwa (NGR); Diaaeldin Kamal (EGY)
European Qualification Tournament	2	Giorgi Meshvildishvili (AZE); Kamil Kościółek (POL)
Asian Qualification Tournament	2	Mönkhtöriin Lkhagvagerel (MGL); Yusup Batirmurzaev (KAZ)
World Qualification Tournament	3	Aiaal Lazarev (KGZ); Deng Zhiwei (CHN); Dániel Ligeti (HUN)
Total	16	

== Men's Greco-Roman events ==
=== 60 kg ===
Competition	Places	Qualified wrestlers
2023 World Championships	5	Zholaman Sharshenbekov (KGZ); Kenichiro Fumita (JPN); Cao Liguo (CHN); Islomjon Bakhromov (UZB); Mehdi Mohsennejad (IRI)
Pan American Qualification Tournament	2	Raiber Rodríguez (VEN); Kevin de Armas (CUB)
African & Oceania Qualification Tournament	2	Abdelkarim Fergat (ALG); Moamen Ahmed Mohamed (EGY)
European Qualification Tournament	2	Victor Ciobanu (MDA); Enes Başar (TUR)
Asian Qualification Tournament	2	Aidos Sultangali (KAZ); Ri Se-ung (PRK)
World Qualification Tournament	3	Murad Mammadov (AZE); Georgii Tibilov (SRB); Răzvan Arnăut (ROU) (Note: Sadyk Lalaev, Sergey Kutuzov, Kiryl Maskevich, Artur Sargsian, Pavel Hlinchuk, Olga Khoroshavtseva and Veranika Ivanova originally earned their quota places through the 2024 World Olympic Qualification Tournament, but they were rejected by the IOC. Their spots were reallocated to the next best eligible wrestlers.)
Special Invitation	1	Jamal Valizadeh (EOR)
Total	17	

=== 67 kg ===
Competition	Places	Qualified wrestlers
2023 World Championships	5	Luis Orta (CUB); Hasrat Jafarov (AZE); Mate Nemeš (SRB); Mohammad Reza Geraei (IRI); Slavik Galstyan (ARM)
Pan American Qualification Tournament	2	Néstor Almanza (CHI); Andrés Montaño (ECU)
African & Oceania Qualification Tournament	2	Souleymen Nasr (TUN); Ishak Ghaiou (ALG)
European Qualification Tournament	2	Parviz Nasibov (UKR); Mamadassa Sylla (FRA)
Asian Qualification Tournament	2	Amantur Ismailov (KGZ); Kyotaro Sogabe (JPN)
World Qualification Tournament	3	Valentin Petic (MDA); Ramaz Zoidze (GEO); Mohamed Ibrahim El-Sayed (EGY)
Total	16	

=== 77 kg ===
Competition	Places	Qualified wrestlers
2023 World Championships	5	Akzhol Makhmudov (KGZ); Sanan Suleymanov (AZE); Malkhas Amoyan (ARM); Nao Kusaka (JPN); Aram Vardanyan (UZB)
Pan American Qualification Tournament	2	Yosvanys Peña (CUB); Jair Cuero (COL)
African & Oceania Qualification Tournament	2	Abdelkrim Ouakali (ALG); Mahmoud Abdelrahman (EGY)
European Qualification Tournament	2	Burhan Akbudak (TUR); Jonni Sarkkinen (FIN)
Asian Qualification Tournament	2	Demeu Zhadrayev (KAZ); Amin Kavianinejad (IRI)
World Qualification Tournament	3	Aik Mnatsakanian (BUL); Zoltán Lévai (HUN); Kamal Bey (USA)
Total	16	

=== 87 kg ===
Competition	Places	Qualified wrestlers
2023 World Championships	5	Ali Cengiz (TUR); Dávid Losonczi (HUN); Zhan Beleniuk (UKR); Semen Novikov (BUL); Nursultan Tursynov (KAZ)
Pan American Qualification Tournament	2	Spencer Woods (USA); Carlos Muñoz (COL)
African & Oceania Qualification Tournament	2	Bachir Sid Azara (ALG); Mohamed Metwally (EGY)
European Qualification Tournament	2	Aleksandr Komarov (SRB); Turpal Bisultanov (DEN)
Asian Qualification Tournament	2	Qian Haitao (CHN); Alireza Mohmadi (IRI)
World Qualification Tournament	3	Rafig Huseynov (AZE); Arkadiusz Kułynycz (POL); Lasha Gobadze (GEO)
Total	16	

=== 97 kg ===
Competition	Places	Qualified wrestlers
2023 World Championships	5	Gabriel Rosillo (CUB); Artur Aleksanyan (ARM); Mohammad Hadi Saravi (IRI); Abubakar Khaslakhanau (AIN); Mikheil Kajaia (SRB) (Note: Artur Omarov from Czech Republic originally earned a quota place at the 2023 World Championships but was injured later, Czech Republic didn't replace him with another wrestler, His spot has been replaced by Mikheil Kajaia, the next best-ranked available wrestler from the 2023 World Championships. Wrestlers ahead of him from Lithuania, Germany and Finland later qualified from other qualifiers.)
Pan American Qualification Tournament	2	Kevin Mejía (HON); Alan Vera (USA)
African & Oceania Qualification Tournament	2	Fadi Rouabah (ALG); Mohamed Ali Gabr (EGY)
European Qualification Tournament	2	Roberti Kobliashvili (GEO); Mindaugas Venckaitis (LTU)
Asian Qualification Tournament	2	Rustam Assakalov (UZB); Kim Seung-jun (KOR)
World Qualification Tournament	3	Arvi Savolainen (FIN); Uzur Dzhuzupbekov (KGZ); Lucas Lazogianis (GER)
Total	16	

=== 130 kg ===
Competition	Places	Qualified wrestlers
2023 World Championships	~~(5)~~ 6	Amin Mirzazadeh (IRI); Rıza Kayaalp (TUR); Abdellatif Mohamed (EGY); Óscar Pino (CUB); Meng Lingzhe (CHN); Romas Fridrikas (LTU) (Note: Amine Guennichi from Tunisia originally won the African and Oceania qualifier but failed a drug test later, with no eligible wrestler from that competition his spot have been replaced by the next best wrestler from the World Championship.)
Pan American Qualification Tournament	2	Cohlton Schultz (USA); Yasmani Acosta (CHI)
African & Oceania Qualification Tournament	~~(2)~~ 1	~~Amine Guennichi (TUN)~~; Oussama Assad (MAR)
European Qualification Tournament	2	Jello Krahmer (GER); Georgi Ivanov (BUL)
Asian Qualification Tournament	2	Lee Seung-chan (KOR); Alimkhan Syzdykov (KAZ)
World Qualification Tournament	3	Sabah Shariati (AZE); Alin Alexuc-Ciurariu (ROU); Heiki Nabi (EST)
Total	16	

== Women's freestyle events ==
=== 50 kg ===
Competition	Places	Qualified wrestlers
2023 World Championships	5	Yui Susaki (JPN); Dolgorjavyn Otgonjargal (MGL); Feng Ziqi (CHN); Sarah Hildebrandt (USA); Evin Demirhan Yavuz (TUR)
Pan American Qualification Tournament	2	Alisson Cardozo (COL); Yusneylys Guzmán (CUB)
African & Oceania Qualification Tournament	2	Nada Medani (EGY); Ibtissem Doudou (ALG)
European Qualification Tournament	2	Oksana Livach (UKR); Gabija Dilytė (LTU)
Asian Qualification Tournament	2	Aktenge Keunimjaeva (UZB); Vinesh Phogat (IND)
World Qualification Tournament	3	Anastasia Blayvas (GER); Mariya Stadnik (AZE); Emanuela Liuzzi (ITA) (Note: Kim Son-hyang from North Korea originally won a quota at the World Qualifiers, but North Korea rejected the quota, the next best wrestler took her spot instead.)
Total	16	

=== 53 kg ===
Competition	Places	Qualified wrestlers
2023 World Championships	5	Akari Fujinami (JPN); Lucía Yépez (ECU); Antim Panghal (IND); Jonna Malmgren (SWE); Maria Prevolaraki (GRE)
Pan American Qualification Tournament	2	Dominique Parrish (USA); Betzabeth Argüello (VEN)
African & Oceania Qualification Tournament	2	Christianah Ogunsanya (NGR); Mia-Lahnee Aquino (GUM)
European Qualification Tournament	2	Andreea Ana (ROU); Annika Wendle (GER)
Asian Qualification Tournament	2	Pang Qianyu (CHN); Choe Hyo-gyong (PRK)
World Qualification Tournament	3	Mariana Drăguțan (MDA); Batkhuyagiin Khulan (MGL); Zeynep Yetgil (TUR)
Total	16	

=== 57 kg ===
Competition	Places	Qualified wrestlers
2023 World Championships	5	Tsugumi Sakurai (JPN); Anastasia Nichita (MDA); Odunayo Adekuoroye (NGR); Helen Maroulis (USA); Anhelina Lysak (POL)
Pan American Qualification Tournament	2	Luisa Valverde (ECU); Hannah Taylor (CAN)
African & Oceania Qualification Tournament	2	Rckaela Aquino (GUM); Chaimaa Aouissi (ALG)
European Qualification Tournament	2	Sandra Paruszewski (GER); Alina Hrushyna (UKR)
Asian Qualification Tournament	2	Hong Kexin (CHN); Anshu Malik (IND)
World Qualification Tournament	3	Giullia Penalber (BRA); Aurora Russo (ITA); Boldsaikhany Khongorzul (MGL)
Total	16	

=== 62 kg ===
Competition	Places	Qualified wrestlers
2023 World Championships	5	Aisuluu Tynybekova (KGZ); Sakura Motoki (JPN); Grace Bullen (NOR); Iryna Koliadenko (UKR); Luisa Niemesch (GER)
Pan American Qualification Tournament	2	Kayla Miracle (USA); Ana Godinez (CAN)
African & Oceania Qualification Tournament	2	Esther Kolawole (NGR); Siwar Bousetta (TUN)
European Qualification Tournament	2	Bilyana Dudova (BUL); Améline Douarre (FRA)
Asian Qualification Tournament	2	Pürevdorjiin Orkhon (MGL); Lee Han-bit (KOR) (Note: Mun Hyon-gyong from North Korea originally won a quota at the Asian Qualifiers, but North Korea rejected the quota, the next best wrestler took her spot instead.)
World Qualification Tournament	3	Kriszta Incze (ROU); Nesrin Baş (TUR); Johanna Lindborg (SWE)
Total	16	

=== 68 kg ===
Competition	Places	Qualified wrestlers
2023 World Championships	5	Buse Tosun Çavuşoğlu (TUR); Enkhsaikhany Delgermaa (MGL); Koumba Larroque (FRA); Irina Rîngaci (MDA); Ami Ishii (JPN)
Pan American Qualification Tournament	2	Amit Elor (USA); Soleymi Caraballo (VEN)
African & Oceania Qualification Tournament	2	Blessing Oborududu (NGR); Tayla Ford (NZL)
European Qualification Tournament	2	Wiktoria Chołuj (POL); Manola Skobelska (UKR)
Asian Qualification Tournament	2	Pak Sol-gum (PRK); Meerim Zhumanazarova (KGZ)
World Qualification Tournament	3	Nisha Dahiya (IND); Zhou Feng (CHN); Linda Morais (CAN)
Total	16	

=== 76 kg ===
Competition	Places	Qualified wrestlers
2023 World Championships	5	Yuka Kagami (JPN); Aiperi Medet Kyzy (KGZ); Tatiana Rentería (COL); Adeline Gray (USA); Milaimys Marín (CUB)
Pan American Qualification Tournament	2	Justina Di Stasio (CAN); Génesis Reasco (ECU)
African & Oceania Qualification Tournament	2	Hannah Reuben (NGR); Zaineb Sghaier (TUN)
European Qualification Tournament	2	Bernadett Nagy (HUN); Yasemin Adar Yiğit (TUR)
Asian Qualification Tournament	2	Reetika Hooda (IND); Wang Juan (CHN)
World Qualification Tournament	3	Cătălina Axente (ROU); Yuliana Yaneva (BUL); Enkh-Amaryn Davaanasan (MGL)
Total	16	
