= 2024 African & Oceania Wrestling Olympic Qualification Tournament =

Regional qualifying tournament in Egypt

- Venue: Borg El-Arab Sports Hall
- Location: Alexandria, Egypt
- Dates: 22–24 March 2024

The 2024 African & Oceania Wrestling Olympic Qualification Tournament was the second regional qualifying tournament for the 2024 Summer Olympics. The event was held from 22 to 24 March 2024, in Alexandria, Egypt.

== Qualification summary ==
NOC	Men's freestyle						Men's Greco-Roman						Women's freestyle						Total
NOC	57	65	74	86	97	125	60	67	77	87	97	130	50	53	57	62	68	76	Total
Algeria				X			X	X	X	X	X		X		X				8
Australia		X		X															2
Egypt	X		X		X	X	X		X	X	X		X						9
Guam														X	X				2
Guinea-Bissau	X		X																2
Morocco												X							1
New Zealand																	X		1
Nigeria						X								X		X	X	X	5
Samoa		X																	1
South Africa					X														1
Tunisia								X				X				X		X	4
Total:11 NOCs	2	2	2	2	2	2	2	2	2	2	2	2	2	2	2	2	2	2	36

== Men's freestyle ==
=== 57 kg ===
24 March

Round of 16
~~Abdelhak Kherbache (ALG)~~
Thomas Santiago (GUM)	WO
Ben Hachem Tarik (MAR)	5
Khalil Barkouti (TUN)	11
Daroa Olsson (NRU)	0
Enozunimi Simeon (NGR)	10
Alexander Buckman (CPV)	0
Suraj Singh (NZL)	8^{F}
Mika Lehmkuhl (RSA)	4
Omar Faye (SEN)	8

Quarterfinals
Gamal Mohamed (EGY)	10
Thomas Santiago (GUM)	0
Khalil Barkouti (TUN)	11^{F}
Enozunimi Simeon (NGR)	1
Roland Tambi (CMR)	0
Suraj Singh (NZL)	10
Omar Faye (SEN)	0
Diamantino Iuna Fafé (GBS)	6^{F}

Semifinals
Gamal Mohamed (EGY)	8
Khalil Barkouti (TUN)	0
Suraj Singh (NZL)	0
Diamantino Iuna Fafé (GBS)	10

Qualified athletes
Gamal Mohamed (EGY)	Q
Diamantino Iuna Fafé (GBS)	Q

=== 65 kg ===
24 March

Round of 16
Stephen Izolo (NGR)	11
Cristian Nicolescu (PLW)	0
Cole Hawkins (NZL)	0
Wotna Cana Ndoc (GBS)	10
~~Lowe Bingham (NRU)~~
Junjun Asebias (FSM)	WO
Gaku Akazawa (SAM)	10
Omar Mohamed Mourad (EGY)	0
Georgii Okorokov (AUS)	12
Samuel Dohya (CMR)	0
Anthony Wesley (CPV)	WO
~~Sylvio Diatta (SEN)~~
Chouaib Sahraoui (ALG)	16
Otmane El-Bahja (MAR)	5
Farouk Jelassi (TUN)	6
Manaceu Ngonda (ANG)	9

Quarterfinals
Stephen Izolo (NGR)	3
Wotna Cana Ndoc (GBS)	14
Junjun Asebias (FSM)	0
Gaku Akazawa (SAM)	10
Georgii Okorokov (AUS)	8^{F}
Anthony Wesley (CPV)	0
Chouaib Sahraoui (ALG)	14
Manaceu Ngonda (ANG)	24

Semifinals
Wotna Cana Ndoc (GBS)	2
Gaku Akazawa (SAM)	4^{F}
Georgii Okorokov (AUS)	10
Manaceu Ngonda (ANG)	0

Qualified athletes
Gaku Akazawa (SAM)	Q
Georgii Okorokov (AUS)	Q

=== 74 kg ===
24 March

Round of 32
Abdelkader Ikkal (ALG)	WO	~~Francisco Kadima (ANG)~~

Round of 16
Bacar Ndum (GBS)	10
Khairiddine Ben Tlili (TUN)	5
Abdelkader Ikkal (ALG)	10
Ethan Thomas (AUS)	0
John Rojas (GUM)	6
Mamadou Diouf (SEN)	15
Baki Tchani (BEN)	0
Braveman Oyeinkeperemo (NGR)	10
Jacques Monty (CMR)	12
Mathayo Mahabila (KEN)	6
Rayanne Es-Saidi (MAR)	10
João Vicente (CPV)	0
Linus van Rensburg (RSA)	6^{F}
Israel Niyonkuru (BDI)	0
Aimé Rakotoniaina (MAD)	2
Amr Reda Hussen (EGY)	12^{F}

Quarterfinals
Bacar Ndum (GBS)	8
Abdelkader Ikkal (ALG)	2
Mamadou Diouf (SEN)	0
Braveman Oyeinkeperemo (NGR)	12^{F}
Jacques Monty (CMR)	0
Rayanne Es-Saidi (MAR)	7
Linus van Rensburg (RSA)	0
Amr Reda Hussen (EGY)	4^{F}

Semifinals
Bacar Ndum (GBS)	10
Braveman Oyeinkeperemo (NGR)	2
Rayanne Es-Saidi (MAR)	0
Amr Reda Hussen (EGY)	11

Qualified athletes
Bacar Ndum (GBS)	Q
Amr Reda Hussen (EGY)	Q

=== 86 kg ===
24 March

Round of 16
David Ste-Marie (MRI)	0
Imed Kaddidi (TUN)	10
Jayden Lawrence (AUS)	11
Siny Sembène (SEN)	0
Fateh Benferdjallah (ALG)	11
Mohamed Camara (GUI)	0
Edward Lessing (RSA)	7
Matteo Monteiro (CPV)	12

Quarterfinals
Harrison Onovwiomogbohwo (NGR)	7
Imed Kaddidi (TUN)	6
Jayden Lawrence (AUS)	9
Ahmed Khaled Mahmoud (EGY)	1
Mark Inguyesi (KEN)	0
Fateh Benferdjallah (ALG)	5^{F}
Matteo Monteiro (CPV)	2
Cédric Abossolo (CMR)	9

Semifinals
Harrison Onovwiomogbohwo (NGR)	4
Jayden Lawrence (AUS)	4
Fateh Benferdjallah (ALG)	7
Cédric Abossolo (CMR)	0

Qualified athletes
Jayden Lawrence (AUS)	Q
Fateh Benferdjallah (ALG)	Q

=== 97 kg ===
24 March

Round of 16
Maulalo Alofipo (SAM)	2
Thomas Barns (AUS)	12

Quarterfinals
Mostafa El-Ders (EGY)	12
Thomas Barns (AUS)	1
Amoussou Cakpo (BEN)	0
Walieddine Kebir (ALG)	11
Franck Anaba (CMR)	0
Mohamed Saadaoui (TUN)	13^{F}
Steyn de Lange (RSA)	14
Pape Ndiaye (SEN)	3

Semifinals
Mostafa El-Ders (EGY)	15
Walieddine Kebir (ALG)	3
Mohamed Saadaoui (TUN)	2
Steyn de Lange (RSA)	5^{F}

Qualified athletes
Mostafa El-Ders (EGY)	Q
Steyn de Lange (RSA)	Q

=== 125 kg ===
24 March

Round of 16
~~Hamza Haloui (ALG)~~
Marcus Carney (NZL)	WO

Quarterfinals
Ashton Mutuwa (NGR)	4^{F}
Marcus Carney (NZL)	0
Oussama Assad (MAR)	1
Justin van Zyl (RSA)	10^{F}
Modou Faye (SEN)	9
Georges Tchadie (CMR)	0
Hamza Rahmani (TUN)	1
Diaaeldin Kamal (EGY)	5

Semifinals
Ashton Mutuwa (NGR)	16^{F}
Justin van Zyl (RSA)	8
Modou Faye (SEN)	3
Diaaeldin Kamal (EGY)	3

Qualified athletes
Ashton Mutuwa (NGR)	Q
Diaaeldin Kamal (EGY)	Q

== Men's Greco-Roman ==
=== 60 kg ===
22 March

Quarterfinals		Semifinals		Qualified athletes
Ibrahim Bunduka (SLE)	0
Abdelkarim Fergat (ALG)	9	Abdelkarim Fergat (ALG)	5
Romio Goliath (NAM)	3	Ismail Et-Talibi (MAR)	1
Ismail Et-Talibi (MAR)	11			Abdelkarim Fergat (ALG)	Q
Latuf Madi (COM)	1			Moamen Ahmed Mohamed (EGY)	Q
Yassine Hkiri (TUN)	1	Latuf Madi (COM)	5
Given Sikhosana (RSA)	0	Moamen Ahmed Mohamed (EGY)	6
Moamen Ahmed Mohamed (EGY)	10

=== 67 kg ===
22 March

Round of 16
Souleymen Nasr (TUN)	WO
~~Anthony Wesley (CPV)~~
Barend Badenhorst (RSA)	1
Ishak Ghaiou (ALG)	11
Ando Lehtmets (AUS)	11
Lowe Bingham (NRU)	0

Quarterfinals
Mohamed Ibrahim El-Sayed (EGY)	4
Souleymen Nasr (TUN)	7
Bilal El-Bahja (MAR)	7
Sahid Kargbo (SLE)	18
Cristian Nicolescu (PLW)	0
Ishak Ghaiou (ALG)	9
Ando Lehtmets (AUS)	WO
~~Gaku Akazawa (SAM)~~

Semifinals
Souleymen Nasr (TUN)	11
Sahid Kargbo (SLE)	0
Ishak Ghaiou (ALG)	5
Ando Lehtmets (AUS)	1

Qualified athletes
Souleymen Nasr (TUN)	Q
Ishak Ghaiou (ALG)	Q

=== 77 kg ===
22 March

Quarterfinals		Semifinals		Qualified athletes
Abdelkrim Ouakali (ALG)	9
Francisco Kadima (ANG)	0	Abdelkrim Ouakali (ALG)	11
Yassine Chekly (MAR)	9	Yassine Chekly (MAR)	0
Zhang Sheng (AUS)	0			Abdelkrim Ouakali (ALG)	Q
Devin Benhard (NAM)	0			Mahmoud Abdelrahman (EGY)	Q
Dean van Zyl (RSA)	9	Dean van Zyl (RSA)	0
Sami Slama (TUN)	3	Mahmoud Abdelrahman (EGY)	9
Mahmoud Abdelrahman (EGY)	5^{F}

=== 87 kg ===
22 March

Pos	Athlete	Pld	W	L	CP	TP	ALG	TUN	MAR
1	Bachir Sid Azara (ALG)	2	2	0	8	18	—	9–0	9–0
2	Hakim Trabelsi (TUN)	2	1	1	4	9	0–4 SU	—	9–0
3	Wadii Oualal (MAR)	2	0	2	0	0	0–4 SU	0–4 SU	—

Source: UWW

Pos	Athlete	Pld	W	L	CP	TP	EGY	ANG	RSA
1	Mohamed Metwally (EGY)	2	2	0	9	19	—	9–1	10–1 Fall
2	Roberto Nsangua (ANG)	2	1	1	5	9	1–4 SU1	—	8–0
3	Richard Ferreira (RSA)	2	0	2	0	1	0–5 FA	0–4 SU	—

Source: UWW

Semifinals
Bachir Sid Azara (ALG)	8
Roberto Nsangua (ANG)	0
Mohamed Metwally (EGY)	13^{C}
Hakim Trabelsi (TUN)	9

Qualified athletes
Bachir Sid Azara (ALG)	Q
Mohamed Metwally (EGY)	Q
3rd place
Roberto Nsangua (ANG)	WO
Hakim Trabelsi (TUN)

=== 97 kg ===
22 March

Pos	Athlete	Pld	W	L	CP	TP	ALG	MAR	SAM
1	Fadi Rouabah (ALG)	2	2	0	7	15	—	7–0	8–0
2	Wissam Kouainso (MAR)	2	1	1	4	9	0–3 PO	—	9–0
3	Maulalo Alofipo (SAM)	2	0	2	0	0	0–4 SU	0–4 SU	—

Source: UWW

Pos	Athlete	Pld	W	L	CP	TP	EGY	TUN	RSA
1	Mohamed Ali Gabr (EGY)	2	2	0	7	13	—	4–0	9–0
2	Skander Missaoui (TUN)	2	1	1	4	8	0–3 PO	—	8–0
3	Christiaan Burger (RSA)	2	0	2	0	0	0–4 SU	0–4 SU	—

Source: UWW

Semifinals
Fadi Rouabah (ALG)	8
Skander Missaoui (TUN)	0
Mohamed Ali Gabr (EGY)	10
Wissam Kouainso (MAR)	0

Qualified athletes
Fadi Rouabah (ALG)	Q
Mohamed Ali Gabr (EGY)	Q
3rd place
Skander Missaoui (TUN)	0
Wissam Kouainso (MAR)	8

=== 130 kg ===
22 March

Pos	Athlete	Pld	W	L	CP	TP	TUN	MAR	NZL	ALG
1	Amine Guennichi (TUN)	3	3	0	14	8	—	8–0	WO	WO
2	Oussama Assad (MAR)	3	2	1	9	9	0–4 SU	—	9–0	WO
—	Marcus Carney (NZL)	3	1	2	5	0	0–5 FO	0–4 SU	—	WO
—	Hamza Haloui (ALG)	3	0	3	0	0	0–5 FO	0–5 FO	0–5 FO	—

Source: UWW

== Women's freestyle ==
=== 50 kg ===
23 March

Round of 16
Matilda Kokera (RSA)	2
Juliana Valencia Velez (AUS)	13
Paulina Duenas (GUM)	0
Chahrazed Ayachi (TUN)	5^{F}

Quarterfinals
Mercy Genesis (NGR)	4^{F}
Juliana Valencia Velez (AUS)	0
Nada Medani (EGY)	11
Emma Wangila (KEN)	0
Victorine Rasoarimalala (MAD)	2
Ibtissem Doudou (ALG)	4^{F}
Chahrazed Ayachi (TUN)	3^{F}
Rosine Ntsa Assouga (CMR)	3

Semifinals
Mercy Genesis (NGR)	5
Nada Medani (EGY)	7
Ibtissem Doudou (ALG)	9
Chahrazed Ayachi (TUN)	6

Qualified athletes
Nada Medani (EGY)	Q
Ibtissem Doudou (ALG)	Q

=== 53 kg ===
23 March

Round of 16
Zineb Ech-Chabki (MAR)	17^{F}
Chahinez Rabah (ALG)	14
Mia-Lahnee Aquino (GUM)	12
Jessica Lavers-McBain (AUS)	1

Quarterfinals
Christianah Ogunsanya (NGR)	10
Zineb Ech-Chabki (MAR)	0
Shaimaa Atef Mohamed (EGY)	3^{F}
Elisa Rasoanantenaina (MAD)	0
Miriam Ngoe Wase (CMR)	4
Lobna Ichaoui (TUN)	6
Mia-Lahnee Aquino (GUM)	4
Nogona Bakayoko (CIV)	4

Semifinals
Christianah Ogunsanya (NGR)	10
Shaimaa Atef Mohamed (EGY)	0
Lobna Ichaoui (TUN)	0
Mia-Lahnee Aquino (GUM)	11^{F}

Qualified athletes
Christianah Ogunsanya (NGR)	Q
Mia-Lahnee Aquino (GUM)	Q

=== 57 kg ===
23 March

Round of 16
Ester Abraham (NAM)	0
Rckaela Aquino (GUM)	10
Kara le Roux (RSA)	0
Irene Symeonidis (AUS)	10

Quarterfinals
Zineb Hassoune (MAR)	1
Rckaela Aquino (GUM)	12
Louji Walid Yassin (EGY)	1^{R}
Faten Hammami (TUN)	7
Malala Soloniaina (MAD)	2
Natacha Nabaina (CMR)	13
Irene Symeonidis (AUS)	0
Chaimaa Aouissi (ALG)	4^{F}

Semifinals
Rckaela Aquino (GUM)	4
Faten Hammami (TUN)	3
Natacha Nabaina (CMR)	8
Chaimaa Aouissi (ALG)	11

Qualified athletes
Rckaela Aquino (GUM)	Q
Chaimaa Aouissi (ALG)	Q

=== 62 kg ===
23 March

Round of 16
Nachi Masuda (AUS)	10
Laralei Gandaoli (GUM)	0
Gharam Askar (EGY)	6
Mastoura Soudani (ALG)	6

Quarterfinals
Esther Kolawole (NGR)	9
Nachi Masuda (AUS)	0
Angelina Miranda (CPV)	11
Eunice Mburu (KEN)	0
Gloria Niyonkuru (BDI)	0
Siwar Bousetta (TUN)	10
Mastoura Soudani (ALG)	12
Minette Kruger (RSA)	2

Semifinals
Esther Kolawole (NGR)	10
Angelina Miranda (CPV)	0
Siwar Bousetta (TUN)	12
Mastoura Soudani (ALG)	1

Qualified athletes
Esther Kolawole (NGR)	Q
Siwar Bousetta (TUN)	Q

=== 68 kg ===
23 March

Quarterfinals		Semifinals		Qualified athletes
Blessing Oborududu (NGR)	10
Nour Jeljeli (TUN)	0	Blessing Oborududu (NGR)	2^{F}
Uilau Tarkong (PLW)	18	Uilau Tarkong (PLW)	0
Kawiyatou Issifou (BEN)	8			Blessing Oborududu (NGR)	Q
~~Bea Meiring (RSA)~~				Tayla Ford (NZL)	Q
Tayla Ford (NZL)	WO	Tayla Ford (NZL)	6^{F}
Samah Abdellatif (EGY)	5	Samah Abdellatif (EGY)	1
Blandine Ngiri (CMR)	4

=== 76 kg ===
23 March

Pos	Athlete	Pld	W	L	CP	TP	NGR	TUN	SUD
1	Hannah Reuben (NGR)	2	2	0	9	14	—	10–0	4–0 Fall
2	Zaineb Sghaier (TUN)	2	1	1	5	4	0–4 SU	—	4–0 Fall
3	Patricia El-Nour (SUD)	2	0	2	0	0	0–5 FA	0–5 FA	—

Source: UWW

Pos	Athlete	Pld	W	L	CP	TP	EGY	CIV	CMR
1	Samar Amer (EGY)	2	2	0	8	9	—	4–1	5–0 Fall
2	Amy Youin (CIV)	2	1	1	6	11	1–3 PO1	—	10–3 Fall
3	Pélagie Wilita (CMR)	2	0	2	0	3	0–5 FA	0–5 FA	—

Source: UWW

Semifinals
Hannah Reuben (NGR)	6
Amy Youin (CIV)	0
Samar Amer (EGY)	8
Zaineb Sghaier (TUN)	14^{F}

Qualified athletes
Hannah Reuben (NGR)	Q
Zaineb Sghaier (TUN)	Q
3rd place
Amy Youin (CIV)	WO
~~Samar Amer (EGY)~~
