= 2024 Poland Open =

Poland wrestling tournament

2024 Ziolkowski, Pytlasinski, Poland Open
- Host city: Warsaw, Poland
- Dates: 19–23 June 2024
- Stadium: Arena Ursynów

Champions
- Freestyle: Poland
- Greco-Roman: Poland
- Women: Poland

The 2024 Poland Open is a sport wrestling event was held in Warsaw, Poland between 19 and 23 July 2024. 28th Poland Open in Women's Wrestling, 33rd Wacław Ziolkowski Memorial in Freestyle wrestling and 67th Wladyslaw Pytlasiński Memorial in Greco – Roman.

== Event videos ==
The event will air freely on the SportZona YouTube channel.

Broadcast
19 June 2024 Mat 1	19 June 2024 Mat 2
20 June 2024 Mat 1	20 June 2024 Mat 2
21 June 2024 Mat 1	21 June 2024 Mat 2
22 June 2024 Mat 1	22 June 2024 Mat 2
23 June 2024 Mat 1	23 June 2024 Mat 2

== Medal table ==
* Host nation (Poland)

Rank	Nation	Gold	Silver	Bronze	Total
1	Poland*	6	6	18	30
2	Kyrgyzstan	4	2	1	7
3	United States	2	2	2	6
4	Azerbaijan	2	1	0	3
5	Serbia	2	0	0	2
6	Algeria	1	2	3	6
7	Germany	1	2	0	3
8	Ukraine	1	1	4	6
9	Georgia	1	1	3	5
10	Colombia	1	1	2	4
10	Latvia	1	1	2	4
12	Sweden	1	1	1	3
13	Egypt	1	0	3	4
14	Chile	1	0	0	1
14	Mexico	1	0	0	1
14	New Zealand	1	0	0	1
17	Hungary	0	3	3	6
18	Canada	0	1	1	2
18	Lithuania	0	1	1	2
20	Finland	0	1	0	1
20	Guinea-Bissau	0	1	0	1
22	Tunisia	0	0	2	2
23	Kazakhstan	0	0	1	1
Totals (23 entries)		27	27	47	101

== Team ranking ==
Rank	Men's freestyle		Men's Greco-Roman		Women's freestyle	
Rank	Team	Points	Team	Points	Team	Points
1	Poland	412	Poland	499	Poland	505
2	Georgia	275	Ukraine	230	United States	300
3	Hungary	210	Kyrgyzstan	220	Germany	130
4	Azerbaijan	140	Sweden	120	Kyrgyzstan	90
5	Egypt	140	Serbia	110	Colombia	80

== Medal overview ==
=== Men's freestyle (Waclaw Ziolkowski Memorial) ===
Event	Gold	Silver	Bronze
57 kg	Roman Bravo-Young; Mexico	Diamantino Iuna Fafé; Guinea-Bissau	Gamal Mohamed; Egypt
61 kg	Omar Gazashvili; Georgia	Abdelhak Kherbache; Algeria	Tamazi Sulamanidze; Georgia
65 kg	Krzysztof Bieńkowski; Poland	Gamzatgadzsi Halidov; Hungary	Georgi Shoniia; Georgia
65 kg	Krzysztof Bieńkowski; Poland	Gamzatgadzsi Halidov; Hungary	Daniel Kulczyński; Poland
70 kg	Sabir Jafarov; Azerbaijan	Ainis Kuļikovskis; Latvia	Not awarded as there were only 2 competitors.
74 kg	Amr Reda Hussen; Egypt	Szymon Wojtkowski; Poland	Not awarded as there were only 2 competitors.
79 kg	Chemseddine Fetairia; Algeria	Ashraf Ashirov; Azerbaijan	Alans Amirovs; Latvia
79 kg	Chemseddine Fetairia; Algeria	Ashraf Ashirov; Azerbaijan	Otari Adeishvili; Georgia
86 kg	Ivars Samušonoks; Latvia	Giorgi Sulava; Georgia	Fateh Benferdjallah; Algeria
86 kg	Ivars Samušonoks; Latvia	Giorgi Sulava; Georgia	Zétény Gangl; Hungary
92 kg	Abubakr Abakarov; Azerbaijan	Balázs Juhász; Hungary	Filip Rogut; Poland
92 kg	Abubakr Abakarov; Azerbaijan	Balázs Juhász; Hungary	Krisztián Angyal; Hungary
97 kg	Zbigniew Baranowski; Poland	Richárd Végh; Hungary	Michał Bielawski; Poland
97 kg	Zbigniew Baranowski; Poland	Richárd Végh; Hungary	Mostafa El-Ders; Egypt
125 kg	Robert Baran; Poland	Kamil Kościółek; Poland	Milán Korcsog; Hungary
125 kg	Robert Baran; Poland	Kamil Kościółek; Poland	Diaaeldin Kamal; Egypt

=== Men's Greco-Roman (Wladyslaw Pytlasinski Cup) ===
Event	Gold	Silver	Bronze
55 kg	no competitors		
60 kg	Zholaman Sharshenbekov; Kyrgyzstan	Nikita Dementiiev; Ukraine	Abdelkarim Fergat; Algeria
60 kg	Zholaman Sharshenbekov; Kyrgyzstan	Nikita Dementiiev; Ukraine	Gracjan Jedut; Poland
63 kg	Georgii Tibilov; Serbia	Mairbek Salimov; Poland	Michał Tracz; Poland
63 kg	Georgii Tibilov; Serbia	Mairbek Salimov; Poland	Oleksandr Hrushyn; Ukraine
67 kg	Amantur Ismailov; Kyrgyzstan	Razzak Beishekeev; Kyrgyzstan	Gregorz Kunkel; Poland
67 kg	Amantur Ismailov; Kyrgyzstan	Razzak Beishekeev; Kyrgyzstan	Maksym Yevtushenko; Ukraine
72 kg	Mateusz Bernatek; Poland	Christoffer Dahlén] Sweden	Adomas Grigaliūnas; Lithuania
72 kg	Mateusz Bernatek; Poland	Christoffer Dahlén] Sweden	Aleks Razor; Ukraine
77 kg	Akzhol Makhmudov; Kyrgyzstan	Patryk Bednarz; Poland	Jair Cuero; Colombia
77 kg	Akzhol Makhmudov; Kyrgyzstan	Patryk Bednarz; Poland	Artur Politaev; Ukraine
82 kg	Lukas Ahlgren; Sweden	Jonni Sarkkinen; Finland	Timmy Sköld; Sweden
82 kg	Lukas Ahlgren; Sweden	Jonni Sarkkinen; Finland	Ihor Zakharchuk; Poland
87 kg	Aleksandr Komarov; Serbia	Carlos Muñoz; Colombia	Islam Aliev; Poland
87 kg	Aleksandr Komarov; Serbia	Carlos Muñoz; Colombia	Szymon Szymonowicz; Poland
97 kg	Vladlen Kozlyuk; Ukraine	Mindaugas Venckaitis; Lithuania	Fadi Rouabah; Algeria
97 kg	Vladlen Kozlyuk; Ukraine	Mindaugas Venckaitis; Lithuania	Uzur Dzhuzupbekov; Kyrgyzstan
130 kg	Yasmani Acosta; Chile	Dominik Krawczyk; Poland	Not awarded as there were only 2 competitors.

=== Women's freestyle (Poland Open) ===
Event	Gold	Silver	Bronze
50 kg	Agata Walerzak; Poland	Ibtissem Doudou; Algeria	Alisson Cardozo; Colombia
50 kg	Agata Walerzak; Poland	Ibtissem Doudou; Algeria	Natalia Walczak; Poland
53 kg	Dominique Parrish; United States	Sarah Hildebrandt; United States	Anna Łukasiak; Poland
53 kg	Dominique Parrish; United States	Sarah Hildebrandt; United States	Amanda Tomczyk; Poland
55 kg	Jowita Wrzesień; Poland	Katarzyna Krawczyk; Poland	Roksana Zasina; Poland
55 kg	Jowita Wrzesień; Poland	Katarzyna Krawczyk; Poland	Laura Almagambetova; Kazakhstan
57 kg	Helen Maroulis; United States	Sandra Paruszewski; Germany	Alexandra Hedrick; United States
57 kg	Helen Maroulis; United States	Sandra Paruszewski; Germany	Patrycja Strzelczyk; Poland
59 kg	Elena Brugger; Germany	Kalmira Bilimbekova; Kyrgyzstan	Natalia Kubaty; Poland
59 kg	Elena Brugger; Germany	Kalmira Bilimbekova; Kyrgyzstan	Michaela Beck; United States
62 kg	Aisuluu Tynybekova; Kyrgyzstan	Luisa Niemesch; Germany	Olha Padoshyk; Poland
62 kg	Aisuluu Tynybekova; Kyrgyzstan	Luisa Niemesch; Germany	Siwar Bousetta; Tunisia
65 kg	no competitors		
68 kg	Tayla Ford; New Zealand	Olivia Di Bacco; Canada	Natalia Bednarska; Poland
68 kg	Tayla Ford; New Zealand	Olivia Di Bacco; Canada	Elma Zeidlere; Latvia
72 kg	Patrycja Sperka; Poland	None awarded Only one participant was registered.	
76 kg	Tatiana Rentería; Colombia	Yelena Makoyed; United States	Zaineb Sghaier; Tunisia
76 kg	Tatiana Rentería; Colombia	Yelena Makoyed; United States	Daniela Tkachuk; Poland

== Results ==
Legend

- 3C — Won by 3 cautions given to the opponent
- F — Won by fall
- Ret — Retired
- WO — Won by walkover

=== Men's freestyle (Wacław Ziółkowski Memorial) ===
==== Men's freestyle 57 kg ====
	Score	
Round 1
Gamal Mohamed (EGY)	1–12 Fall	Roman Bravo-Young (MEX)
Round 2
Diamantino Iuna Fafé (GBS)	4–3	Gamal Mohamed (EGY)
Round 3
Roman Bravo-Young (MEX)	13–2	Diamantino Iuna Fafé (GBS)

==== Men's freestyle 61 kg ====
	Score	
Round 1
Tamazi Sulamanidze (GEO)	0–11	Abdelhak Kherbache (ALG)
Round 2
Omar Gazashvili (GEO)	4–0	Tamazi Sulamanidze (GEO)
Round 3
Abdelhak Kherbache (ALG)	5–6	Omar Gazashvili (GEO)

==== Men's freestyle 65 kg ====
	Score	
Round 1
Krzysztof Bieńkowski (POL)	5–1	Daniel Kulczyński (POL)
Giorgi Shonia (GEO)	4–5	Gamzatgadzsi Halidov (HUN)
Round 2
Davit Kobuladze (GEO)	4–12	Krzysztof Bieńkowski (POL)
Aminjon Sadulloev (POL)	5–16	Giorgi Shonia (GEO)
Round 3
Daniel Kulczyński (POL)	10–0	Davit Kobuladze (GEO)
Gamzatgadzsi Halidov (HUN)	10–3	Aminjon Sadulloev (POL)
Final III–V
Daniel Kulczyński (POL)	8–0	Aminjon Sadulloev (POL)
Giorgi Shonia (GEO)	2–0 Ret	Davit Kobuladze (GEO)
Final I–II
Krzysztof Bieńkowski (POL)	2–0	Gamzatgadzsi Halidov (HUN)

==== Men's freestyle 70 kg ====
	Score	
Round 1
Sabir Jafarov (AZE)	10–0	Ainis Kuļikovskis (LAT)

==== Men's freestyle 74 kg ====
	Score	
Round 1
Amr Reda Hussen (EGY)	9–0	Szymon Wojtkowski (POL)

==== Men's freestyle 79 kg ====
	Score	
Round 1
Patryk Kostrzewski (POL)	2–6	Tornike Tulashvili (GEO)
Ashraf Ashirov (AZE)	13–9	Otari Adeishvili (GEO)
Mateusz Pędzicki (POL)	3–5	Alans Amirovs (LAT)
Giorgi Burjanadze (GEO)	0–10	Chemseddine Fetairia (ALG)
Round 2
Patryk Kostrzewski (POL)	0–4	Otari Adeishvili (GEO)
Mateusz Pędzicki (POL)	6–8	Giorgi Burjanadze (GEO)
Patryk Ciurzyński (POL)	1–9	Alans Amirovs (LAT)
Round 3
Otari Adeishvili (GEO)	6–0	Patryk Ciurzyński (POL)
Alans Amirovs (LAT)	1–9	Chemseddine Fetairia (ALG)
Tornike Tulashvili (GEO)	2–12	Ashraf Ashirov (AZE)
Final III–V
Alans Amirovs (LAT)	10–0	Giorgi Burjanadze (GEO)
Otari Adeishvili (GEO)	3–0	Tornike Tulashvili (GEO)
Final I–II
Chemseddine Fetairia (ALG)	8–7	Ashraf Ashirov (AZE)

==== Men's freestyle 86 kg ====
	Score	
Round 1
Zétény Gangl (HUN)	WO	Fateh Benferdjallah (ALG)
Ivars Samušonoks (LAT)	10–0	Giorgi Sulava (GEO)
Round 2
Zétény Gangl (HUN)	0–10	Ivars Samušonoks (LAT)
Fateh Benferdjallah (ALG)	WO	Giorgi Sulava (GEO)
Round 3
Zétény Gangl (HUN)}	0–12	Giorgi Sulava (GEO)
Fateh Benferdjallah (ALG)	WO	Ivars Samušonoks (LAT)

==== Men's freestyle 92 kg ====
	Score	
Round 1
Filip Rogut (POL)	0–11	Abubakr Abakarov (AZE)
Krisztián Angyal (HUN)	0–10	Balázs Juhász (HUN)
Round 2
Filip Rogut (POL)	6–1	Krisztián Angyal (HUN)
Abubakr Abakarov (AZE)	10–0	Balázs Juhász (HUN)
Round 3
Filip Rogut (POL)	2–4	Balázs Juhász (HUN)
Abubakr Abakarov (AZE)	10–0	Krisztián Angyal (HUN)

==== Men's freestyle 97 kg ====
	Score	
Round 1
Zbigniew Baranowski (POL)	14–2 Fall	Merab Suleimanishvili (GEO)
Mostafa El-Ders (EGY)	9–5	Michał Bielawski (POL)
Richárd Végh (HUN)	10–0	Grzegorz Mierzejewski (POL)
Round 2
Zbigniew Baranowski (POL)	13–3 3C	Mostafa El-Ders (EGY)
Merab Suleimanishvili (GEO)	6–16	Michał Bielawski (POL)
Wiktor Hasa (POL)	0–12 Fall	Richárd Végh (HUN)
Round 3
Zbigniew Baranowski (POL)	6–0	Michał Bielawski (POL)
Merab Suleimanishvili (GEO)	WO	Mostafa El-Ders (EGY)
Grzegorz Mierzejewski (POL)	2–7	Wiktor Hasa (POL)
Final III–V
Mostafa El-Ders (EGY)	13–0	Grzegorz Mierzejewski (POL)
Wiktor Hasa (POL)	1–6	Michał Bielawski (POL)
Final I–II
Zbigniew Baranowski (POL)	9–1	Richárd Végh (HUN)

==== Men's freestyle 125 kg ====
	Score	
Round 1
Giorgi Chikhradze (GEO)	0–11	Kamil Kościółek (POL)
Robert Baran (POL)	11–0	Milán Korcsog (HUN)
Round 2
Diaaeldin Kamal (EGY)	9–0	Giorgi Chikhradze (GEO)
Kamil Kościółek (POL)	3–4	Robert Baran (POL)
Round 3
Milán Korcsog (HUN)	9–0	Giorgi Chikhradze (GEO)
Kamil Kościółek (POL)	3–0	Diaaeldin Kamal (EGY)
Round 4
Robert Baran (POL)	10–0	Giorgi Chikhradze (GEO)
Milán Korcsog (HUN)	0–2	Diaaeldin Kamal (EGY)
Round 5
Kamil Kościółek (POL)	10–2	Milán Korcsog (HUN)
Robert Baran (POL)	3–0	Diaaeldin Kamal (EGY)

=== Men's Greco-Roman (Władysław Pytlasiński Cup) ===
==== Men's Greco-Roman 60 kg ====
	Score	
Round 1
Gracjan Jedut (POL)	0–9	Nikita Dementiiev (UKR)
Zholaman Sharshenbekov (KGZ)	9–0	Abdelkarim Fergat (ALG)
Round 2
Gracjan Jedut (POL)	0–10	Zholaman Sharshenbekov (KGZ)
Nikita Dementiiev (UKR)	9–0	Abdelkarim Fergat (ALG)
Round 3
Gracjan Jedut (POL)	0–8	Abdelkarim Fergat (ALG)
Nikita Dementiiev (UKR)	1–9	Zholaman Sharshenbekov (KGZ)

==== Men's Greco-Roman 63 kg ====
	Score	
Round 1
Mairbek Salimov (POL)	8–0	Wojciech Kuźmiak (POL)
Georgii Tibilov (SRB)	4–3	Oleksandr Hrushyn (UKR)
Round 2
Viktor Petryk (UKR)	4–8 Fall	Mairbek Salimov (POL)
Michał Tracz (POL)	1–5	Georgii Tibilov (SRB)
Round 3
Wojciech Kuźmiak (POL)	0–9	Viktor Petryk (UKR)
Oleksandr Hrushyn (UKR)	9–0	Michał Tracz (POL)
Final III–V
Viktor Petryk (UKR)	1–2	Michał Tracz (POL)
Oleksandr Hrushyn (UKR)	8–0	Wojciech Kuźmiak (POL)
Final I–II
Mairbek Salimov (POL)	4–11	Georgii Tibilov (SRB)

==== Men's Greco-Roman 67 kg ====
	Score	
Round 1
Mate Nemeš (SRB)	2–7	Amantur Ismailov (KGZ)
Arslanbek Salimov (POL)	WO	Maksym Yevtushenko (UKR)
Piotr Lewandowski (POL)	9–0	Michał Biskupski (POL)
Néstor Almanza (CHI)	2–3	Ishak Ghaiou (ALG)
Grzegorz Kunkel (POL)	3–11	Razzak Beishekeev (KGZ)
Round 2
Mate Nemeš (SRB)	WO	Arslanbek Salimov (POL)
Michał Biskupski (POL)	3–11	Néstor Almanza (CHI)
Amantur Ismailov (KGZ)	10–1	Maksym Yevtushenko (UKR)
Round 3
Grzegorz Kunkel (POL)	0–2 Ret	Mate Nemeš (SRB)
Néstor Almanza (CHI)	1–3	Maksym Yevtushenko (UKR)
Amantur Ismailov (KGZ)	9–0	Piotr Lewandowski (POL)
Ishak Ghaiou (ALG)	0–10	Razzak Beishekeev (KGZ)
Final III–V
Piotr Lewandowski (POL)	3–6	Grzegorz Kunkel (POL)
Maksym Yevtushenko (UKR)	10–1	Ishak Ghaiou (ALG)
Final I–II
Amantur Ismailov (KGZ)	WO	Razzak Beishekeev (KGZ)

==== Men's Greco-Roman 72 kg ====
	Score	
Round 1
Mateusz Bernatek (POL)	3–1	Christoffer Dahlén (SWE)
Aleks Razor (UKR)	0–9	Adomas Grigaliūnas (LTU)
Round 2
Mateusz Bernatek (POL)	8–0	Aleks Razor (UKR)
Christoffer Dahlén (SWE)	5–3	Adomas Grigaliūnas (LTU)
Round 3
Mateusz Bernatek (POL)	8–0	Adomas Grigaliūnas (LTU)
Christoffer Dahlén (SWE)	9–0	Aleks Razor (UKR)

==== Men's Greco-Roman 77 kg ====
	Score	
Round 1
Akzhol Makhmudov (KGZ)	12–2	Artur Politaiev (UKR)
Jair Cuero (COL)	1–1	Konrad Kozłowski (POL)
Patryk Bednarz (POL)	7–1	Vilius Savickas (LTU)
Aleksander Mielewczyk (POL)	3–3	Akseli Yli-Hannuksela (FIN)
Round 2
Artur Politaiev (UKR)	9–0	Konrad Kozłowski (POL)
Vilius Savickas (LTU)	1–0 Ret	Aleksander Mielewczyk (POL)
Abdelkrim Ouakali (ALG)	1–9	Akzhol Makhmudov (KGZ)
Round 3
Artur Politaiev (UKR)	3–1	Abdelkrim Ouakali (ALG)
Akzhol Makhmudov (KGZ)	12–1	Jair Cuero (COL)
Patryk Bednarz (POL)	1–1	Akseli Yli-Hannuksela (FIN)
Final III–V
Jair Cuero (COL)	10–1	Vilius Savickas (LTU)
Artur Politaiev (UKR)	WO	Akseli Yli-Hannuksela (FIN)
Final I–II
Akzhol Makhmudov (KGZ)	8–0	Patryk Bednarz (POL)

==== Men's Greco-Roman 82 kg ====
	Score	
Round 1
Lukas Ahlgren (SWE)	9–0	Ihor Zakharchuk (POL)
Jonni Sarkkinen (FIN)	2–1 Fall	Timmy Sköld (SWE)
Round 2
Lukas Ahlgren (SWE)	4–2	Jonni Sarkkinen (FIN)
Ihor Zakharchuk (POL)	4–12	Timmy Sköld (SWE)
Round 3
Lukas Ahlgren (SWE)	WO	Timmy Sköld (SWE)
Ihor Zakharchuk (POL)	WO	Jonni Sarkkinen (FIN)

==== Men's Greco-Roman 87 kg ====
	Score	
Round 1
Wojciech Kański (POL)	0–9	Aleksandr Komarov (SRB)
Carlos Muñoz (COL)	8–0	Patryk Robaszek (POL)
Round 2
Szymon Szymonowicz (POL)	8–0	Wojciech Kański (POL)
Islam Aliev (POL)	1–10	Carlos Muñoz (COL)
Round 3
Aleksandr Komarov (SRB)	2–1	Szymon Szymonowicz (POL)
Patryk Robaszek (POL)	1–4	Islam Aliev (POL)
Final III–V
Szymon Szymonowicz (POL)	8–0	Patryk Robaszek (POL)
Islam Aliev (POL)	10–0	Wojciech Kański (POL)
Final I–II
Aleksandr Komarov (SRB)	9–0	Carlos Muñoz (COL)

==== Men's Greco-Roman 97 kg ====
	Score	
Round 1
Mindaugas Venckaitis (LTU)	3–1	Jakub Antoszewski (POL)
Vladlen Kozlyuk (UKR)	5–1	Uzur Dzhuzupbekov (KGZ)
Round 2
Igor Shepetun (POL)	1–1	Mindaugas Venckaitis (LTU)
Fadi Rouabah (ALG)	1–3	Vladlen Kozlyuk (UKR)
Round 3
Jakub Antoszewski (POL)	1–10	Igor Shepetun (POL)
Uzur Dzhuzupbekov (KGZ)	6–1	Fadi Rouabah (ALG)
Final III–V
Igor Shepetun (POL)	2–5	Fadi Rouabah (ALG)
Uzur Dzhuzupbekov (KGZ)	WO	Jakub Antoszewski (POL)
Final I–II
Mindaugas Venckaitis (LTU)	1–10	Vladlen Kozlyuk (UKR)

==== Men's Greco-Roman 130 kg ====
	Score	
Final I–II
Yasmani Acosta (CUB)	8–0	Dominik Krawczyk (POL)

=== Women's freestyle (Poland Open) ===
==== Women's freestyle 50 kg ====
	Score	
Round 1
Agata Walerzak (POL)	12–0	Natalia Walczak (POL)
Kim Jin-hee (KOR)	11–0	Alexis Miller (USA)
Round 2
Alisson Cardozo (COL)	0–10	Agata Walerzak (POL)
Ibtissem Doudou (ALG)	8–7	Kim Jin-hee (KOR)
Round 3
Natalia Walczak (POL)	11–10	Alisson Cardozo (COL)
Alexis Miller (USA)	3–10 Fall	Ibtissem Doudou (ALG)
Final III–V
Natalia Walczak (POL)	10–0	Alexis Miller (USA)
Kim Jin-hee (KOR)	1–4 Fall	Alisson Cardozo (COL)
Final I–II
Agata Walerzak (POL)	11–0	Ibtissem Doudou (ALG)

==== Women's freestyle 53 kg ====
	Score	
Round 1
Dominique Parrish (USA)	11–0	Amanda Tomczyk (POL)
Anna Łukasiak (POL)	0–10	Katie Gomez (USA)
Round 2
Sarah Hildebrandt (USA)	WO	Dominique Parrish (USA)
Amanda Tomczyk (POL)	0–9	Anna Łukasiak (POL)
Round 3
Katie Gomez (USA)	4–12	Dominique Parrish (USA)
Amanda Tomczyk (POL)	0–10	Sarah Hildebrandt (USA)
Round 4
Anna Łukasiak (POL)	0–0 Ret	Dominique Parrish (USA)
Katie Gomez (USA)	0–10	Sarah Hildebrandt (USA)
Round 5
Amanda Tomczyk (POL)	WO	Katie Gomez (USA)
Anna Łukasiak (POL)	0–10	Sarah Hildebrandt (USA)

==== Women's freestyle 55 kg ====
	Score	
Round 1
Victoria Báez (ESP)	6–0	Cho Eun-so (KOR)
Jowita Wrzesień (POL)	10–2	Anna Voitova (UKR)
Laura Almaganbetova (KAZ)	0–11	Roksana Zasina (POL)
Round 2
Victoria Báez (ESP)	0–8	Jowita Wrzesień (POL)
Cho Eun-so (KOR)	0–6 Fall	Anna Voitova (UKR)
Katarzyna Krawczyk (POL)	6–3 Fall	Laura Almaganbetova (KAZ)
Round 3
Victoria Báez (ESP)	6–6	Anna Voitova (UKR)
Cho Eun-so (KOR)	0–10	Jowita Wrzesień (POL)
Roksana Zasina (POL)	4–5	Katarzyna Krawczyk (POL)
Final III–V
Victoria Báez (ESP)	4–11	Laura Almaganbetova (KAZ)
Roksana Zasina (POL)	11–0	Anna Voitova (UKR)
Final I–II
Jowita Wrzesień (POL)	3–1	Katarzyna Krawczyk (POL)

==== Women's freestyle 57 kg ====
	Score	
Round 1
Chaimaa Aouissi (ALG)	0–10	Alexandra Hedrick (USA)
Patrycja Strzelczyk (POL)	0–4 Fall	Sandra Paruszewski (GER)
Round 2
Helen Maroulis (USA)	11–0	Chaimaa Aouissi (ALG)
Alexandra Hedrick (USA)	11–0	Patrycja Strzelczyk (POL)
Round 3
Sandra Paruszewski (GER)	10–0	Chaimaa Aouissi (ALG)
Alexandra Hedrick (USA)	0–8	Helen Maroulis (USA)
Round 4
Patrycja Strzelczyk (POL)	2–1	Chaimaa Aouissi (ALG)
Sandra Paruszewski (GER)	1–7 Fall	Helen Maroulis (USA)
Round 5
Alexandra Hedrick (USA)	3–7	Sandra Paruszewski (GER)
Patrycja Strzelczyk (POL)	0–10	Helen Maroulis (USA)

==== Women's freestyle 59 kg ====
	Score	
Round 1
Oksana Moskalova (UKR)	0–10	Elena Brugger (GER)
Michaela Beck (USA)	10–0	Julia Nowicka (POL)
Kalmira Bilimbekova (KGZ)	4–3	Natalia Kubaty (POL)
Round 2
Aleksandra Witoś (POL)	0–8 Fall	Kalmira Bilimbekova (KGZ)
Oksana Moskalova (UKR)	0–11	Michaela Beck (USA)
Elena Brugger (GER)	11–0	Julia Nowicka (POL)
Round 3
Oksana Moskalova (UKR)	9–3	Julia Nowicka (POL)
Elena Brugger (GER)	10–0	Michaela Beck (USA)
Natalia Kubaty (POL)	2–1	Aleksandra Witoś (POL)
Final III–V
Michaela Beck (USA)	10–0	Aleksandra Witoś (POL)
Natalia Kubaty (POL)	4–0	Oksana Moskalova (UKR)
Final I–II
Elena Brugger (GER)	7–0	Kalmira Bilimbekova (KGZ)

==== Women's freestyle 62 kg ====
	Score	
Round 1
Olha Padoshyk (POL)	0–8 Fall	Aisuluu Tynybekova (KGZ)
Sung Hwa-young (KOR)	0–7	Miki Rowbottom (CAN)
Siwar Bousetta (TUN)	2–7 Fall	Luisa Niemesch (GER)
Wiktoria Karwowska (POL)	0–6 Fall	Alīna Antipova (LAT)
Round 2
Olha Padoshyk (POL)	4–3 Fall	Sung Hwa-young (KOR)
Siwar Bousetta (TUN)	10–0	Wiktoria Karwowska (POL)
Aisuluu Tynybekova (KGZ)	8–0 Fall	Miki Rowbottom (CAN)
Luisa Niemesch (GER)	11–0	Alīna Antipova (LAT)
Final III–V
Miki Rowbottom (CAN)	2–3 Fall	Olha Padoshyk (POL)
Siwar Bousetta (TUN)	10–0	Alīna Antipova (LAT)
Final I–II
Aisuluu Tynybekova (KGZ)	4–1	Luisa Niemesch (GER)

==== Women's freestyle 68 kg ====
	Score	
Round 1
Olivia Di Bacco (CAN)	0–2 Fall	Tayla Ford (NZL)
Natalia Bednarska (POL)	0–6 Fall	Elma Zeidlere (LAT)
Round 2
Olivia Di Bacco (CAN)	10–0	Natalia Bednarska (POL)
Tayla Ford (NZL)	4–4	Elma Zeidlere (LAT)
Round 3
Olivia Di Bacco (CAN)	10–0	Elma Zeidlere (LAT)
Tayla Ford (NZL)	8–0 Fall	Natalia Bednarska (POL)

==== Women's freestyle 76 kg ====
	Score	
Round 1
Tatiana Rentería (COL)	5–12 Fall	Yelena Makoyed (USA)
Shenita Lawson (USA)	3–8	Daniela Tkachuk (POL)
Round 2
Zaineb Sghaier (TUN)	3–9	Tatiana Rentería (COL)
Yelena Makoyed (USA)	10–0	Shenita Lawson (USA)
Round 3
Daniela Tkachuk (POL)	0–11	Tatiana Rentería (COL)
Yelena Makoyed (USA)	13–2	Zaineb Sghaier (TUN)
Round 4
Shenita Lawson (USA)	0–10	Tatiana Rentería (COL)
Daniela Tkachuk (POL)	2–11 Fall	Zaineb Sghaier (TUN)
Round 5
Yelena Makoyed (USA)	6–0 Fall	Daniela Tkachuk (POL)
Shenita Lawson (USA)	0–10	Zaineb Sghaier (TUN)
