= Federated States of Micronesia at the 2018 Summer Youth Olympics =

- IOC code: FSM
- NOC: Federated States of Micronesia National Olympic Committee
- Website: www.oceaniasport.com/fsm

in Buenos Aires, Argentina 6 – 18 October 2018
- Competitors: 3 in 2 sports
- Medals: Gold 0 Silver 0 Bronze 0 Total 0

Summer Youth Olympics appearances
- 2010; 2014; 2018

Federated States of Micronesia participated at the 2018 Summer Youth Olympics in Buenos Aires, Argentina from 6 October to 18 October 2018.

== Wrestling ==
Key:

- VT – Victory by fall.
- PP – Decision by points – the loser with technical points.
- PO – Decision by points – the loser without technical points.
- SP – Technical superiority – the loser with technical points and a margin of victory of at least 8 (Greco-Roman) or 10 (freestyle) points.
- ST – Great superiority – the loser without technical points and a margin of victory of at least 8 (Greco-Roman) or 10 (freestyle) points.

Athlete	Event	Preliminary		Final / BM / CR	
Athlete	Event	Opposition Result		Opposition Result	Rank
Athlete	Event	Match 1	Match 2	Opposition Result	Rank
Valentine Yairegpie	−80 kg	Benferdjallah (ALG); L 0–10 ^{ST}	Lee (CAN); L 0–11 ^{VT}	Ryan Marshall (NZL); L 0–4 ^{ST}	6
