= Algeria at the 2024 Summer Olympics =

- IOC code: ALG
- NOC: Algerian Olympic Committee
- Website: www.coa.dz

in Paris, France 26 July 2024 – 11 August 2024
- Competitors: 45 (27 men and 18 women) in 15 sports
- Flag bearers (opening): Yasser Triki & Amina Belkadi
- Flag bearers (closing): Djamel Sedjati & Kaylia Nemour
- Officials: Kheireddine Barbari, chef de mission
- Medals Ranked 39th: Gold 2 Silver 0 Bronze 1 Total 3

Summer Olympics appearances (overview)
- 1964; 1968; 1972; 1976; 1980; 1984; 1988; 1992; 1996; 2000; 2004; 2008; 2012; 2016; 2020; 2024; 2028

Other related appearances
- France (1896–1960)

Algeria competed at the 2024 Summer Olympics in Paris from 26 July to 11 August 2024. Since the nation's official debut in 1964, Algerian athletes have competed in every edition of the Summer Olympic Games, except Montreal 1976, as part of the Congolese-led boycott.

Kaylia Nemour, an artistic gymnast, qualified for the uneven bars final in first place as well as to the all-around final. During the all-around final, Nemour scored a 55.899 and finished fifth in the competition, the highest placement for an African gymnast in an Olympic all-around final. During the uneven bars final, Nemour earned a score of 15.700 to win the gold medal. In doing so, Nemour became the first gymnast from the African continent to win an Olympic gold medal in gymnastics as well as an Olympic medal in gymnastics of any color.

Algeria garnered some controversy due to boxer Imane Khelif having previously barred from 2022 and 2023 sporting events due to not meeting the International Boxing Association determination of sex to compete as a woman. Khelif later became the first boxer in the women's category from Algeria to win an Olympic medal, winning a gold medal in the woman's 66kg division. This was also the first multiple gold medals for Algeria since 1996. The Algerian Olympic Committee (COA) defended Khelif, describing the reaction towards Khelif as "unethical targeting" and "baseless propaganda". The COA stated that they have taken all necessary measures to protect Khelif and her right to compete in the Olympics. Khelif's father, in a statement to Sky Sports, stated, "My child is a girl. She was raised as a girl. She's a strong girl. I raised her to be hard-working and brave. She has a strong will to work and to train." IOC President Thomas Bach defended the participation of Khelif, saying, "There was no doubt she is a woman."

In wrestling, Algeria were represented by eight athletes, however all eight lost their opening matches, a result seen as disappointing for the nation.

In Muay Thai, which was a guest at the Olympics and its medals are not counted in the overall rankings, Abdelmouneme Basta won the gold medal in the under 60 kg category, defeating the Australian Ibrahim Abou Salah in the final.

== Medalists ==
Medal	Name	Sport	Event	Date
Gold	Kaylia Nemour	Gymnastics	Women's uneven bars	4 August
Gold	Imane Khelif	Boxing	Women's 66 kg	9 August
Bronze	Djamel Sedjati	Athletics	Men's 800 m	10 August

Medals by sport
Sport	1st place, gold medalist(s)	2nd place, silver medalist(s)	3rd place, bronze medalist(s)	Total
Athletics	0	0	1	1
Boxing	1	0	0	1
Gymnastics	1	0	0	1
Total	2	0	1	3

Medals by gender
Gender	1st place, gold medalist(s)	2nd place, silver medalist(s)	3rd place, bronze medalist(s)	Total
Female	2	0	0	2
Male	0	0	1	1
Mixed	0	0	0	0
Total	2	0	1	3

Medals by date
Date	1st place, gold medalist(s)	2nd place, silver medalist(s)	3rd place, bronze medalist(s)	Total
4 August	1	0	0	1
9 August	1	0	0	1
10 August	0	0	1	1
Total	2	0	1	3

== Competitors ==
Kheireddine Barbari will be Algeria's chef de mission at the Games.

The following is the list of number of competitors in the Games.

Sport	Men	Women	Total
Athletics	7	1	8
Badminton	1	1	2
Boxing	2	3	5
Canoeing	0	1	1
Cycling	1	1	2
Fencing	1	3	4
Gymnastics	0	1	1
Judo	2	1	3
Rowing	1	1	2
Sailing	1	0	1
Shooting	2	1	3
Swimming	1	1	2
Table tennis	1	1	2
Weightlifting	1	0	1
Wrestling	6	2	8
Total	27	18	45

== Athletics ==
Algerian track and field athletes achieved the entry standards for Paris 2024, either by passing the direct qualifying mark (or time for track and road races) or by world ranking, in the following events (a maximum of 3 athletes each):

Key

- Note–Ranks given for track events are within the athlete's heat only
- Q = Qualified for the next round
- q = Qualified for the next round as a fastest loser or, in field events, by position without achieving the qualifying target
- R = Qualified for the repechage round
- NR = National record
- N/A = Round not applicable for the event
- Bye = Athlete not required to compete in round

Track & road events

Athlete	Event	Preliminary		Heat		Repechage		Semifinal		Final	
Athlete	Event	Time	Rank	Time	Rank	Time	Rank	Time	Rank	Time	Rank
Djamel Sedjati	Men's 800 m	—N/a		1:45.84	1 Q	Bye		1:45.08	1 Q	1:41:50	3rd place, bronze medalist(s)
Slimane Moula	Men's 800 m	—N/a		1:46.71	8	1:45.67	2	Did not advance			
Mohamed Ali Gouaned	Men's 800 m	—N/a		1.47:34	7	1:44.37 =PB	3 q	1:46.52	8	Did not advance	
Amine Bouanani	Men's 110 m hurdles	—N/a		13.58	5	13.54	3	Did not advance			
Bilal Tabti	Men's 3000 m steeplechase	—N/a		9:04.81	12	—N/a				Did not advance	

Field events

Athlete	Event	Qualification		Final	
Athlete	Event	Result	Rank	Result	Rank
Yasser Triki	Men's triple jump	16.85	4 q	17.22	9
Oussama Khennoussi	Men's discus throw	NM		Did not advance	
Zahra Tatar	Women's hammer throw	66.99	25	Did not advance	

== Badminton ==
Algeria entered two badminton players into the Olympic tournament based on the BWF Race to Paris Rankings; marking the nation returning to the sports since the last participation in 2008.

Athlete	Event	Group stage				Round of 16	Quarter-final	Semi-final	Final / BM	
Athlete	Event	Opposition Score	Opposition Score	Opposition Score	Rank	Opposition Score	Opposition Score	Opposition Score	Opposition Score	Rank
Koceila Mammeri; Tanina Mammeri	Mixed doubles	Seo S-j / Chae Y-j (KOR); L (10–21, 7–21)	Puavaranukroh / Taerattanachai (THA); L (14–21, 9–21)	Tabeling / Piek (NED); L (18–21, 9–21)	4	—N/a	Did not advance			

== Boxing ==
Algeria entered five boxers into the Olympic tournament. Roumaysa Boualam (women's flyweight), Hadjila Khelif (women's lightweight) and Imane Khelif (women's welterweight) secured a spots in their respective division by advancing to the final match, while Jugurtha Ait Bekka (men's lightweight) and Mourad Kadi (men's super heavyweight) secured a sports in the respective division by winning the 2023 African Olympic Qualification Tournament in Dakar, Senegal.

Athlete	Event	Round of 32	Round of 16	Quarterfinals	Semifinals	Final / BM	
Athlete	Event	Opposition Result	Opposition Result	Opposition Result	Opposition Result	Opposition Result	Rank
Jugurtha Ait Bekka	Men's 63.5 kg	Bye	Álvarez (CUB); L 0–5	Did not advance			
Mourad Kadi	Men's +92 kg	Bye	Aboudou Moindze (FRA); L 1–4	Did not advance			
Roumaysa Boualam	Women's 50 kg	Bye	Villegas (PHI); L 0–5	Did not advance			
Hadjila Khelif	Women's 60 kg	Bye	Šadrina (SRB); L 0–5	Did not advance			
Imane Khelif	Women's 66 kg	Bye	Carini (ITA); W ABD	Hámori (HUN); W 5–0	Suwannapheng (THA); W 5–0	Liu (CHN); W 5–0	1st place, gold medalist(s)

== Canoeing ==
=== Slalom ===
Algerian canoeists confirmed a boat in the women's K-1 for the Games, by virtue of the re-allocation of unused Oceanian continental spots.

Athlete	Event	Preliminary						Semifinal		Final	
Athlete	Event	Run 1	Rank	Run 2	Rank	Best	Rank	Time	Rank	Time	Rank
Carole Bouzidi	Women's K-1	99.41	14	99.50	17	99.41	19 Q	106.75	14	Did not advance	

Kayak cross

Athlete	Event	Time trial		Round 1	Repechage	Heat	Quarterfinal	Semifinal	Final	
Athlete	Event	Time	Rank	Position	Position	Position	Position	Position	Position	Rank
Carole Bouzidi	Women's KX-1	76.68	24	2 Q	Bye	2 Q	2 Q	3 FB	3	7

== Cycling ==
=== Road ===
Algeria entered one male and one female rider to compete in the road race events at the Olympic. Algeria secured those quota through the UCI Nation Ranking.

Athlete	Event	Time	Rank
Yacine Hamza	Men's road race	DNF	
Nesrine Houili	Women's road race	DNF	

== Fencing ==
Algeria entered four fencers into the Olympic competition. Salim Heroui qualified as the highest ranked individual fencer, eligible from the African zone; and the women's sabre team qualified by becoming the highest ranked African team through the release of the FIE Official rankings.

Athlete	Event	Round of 64	Round of 32	Round of 16	Quarterfinal	Semifinal	Final / BM	
Athlete	Event	Opposition Score	Opposition Score	Opposition Score	Opposition Score	Opposition Score	Opposition Score	Rank
Salim Heroui	Men's foil	Jurkiewicz (POL); L 8–15	Did not advance					
Saoussen Boudiaf	Women's sabre	Kravatska (UKR); L 8–15	Did not advance					
Zohra Nora Kehli	Women's sabre	Daghfous (TUN); L 12–15	Did not advance					
Chaima Benadouda	Women's sabre	Sarybay (KAZ); L 9–15	Did not advance					
Saoussen Boudiaf; Zohra Nora Kehli; Chaima Benadouda; Kaouther Mohamed Belkebir*	Women's team sabre	—N/a			France; L 32–45	United States; L 28–45	Italy; L 27–45	8

== Gymnastics ==
=== Artistic ===
For the first time since 2016, Algeria qualified one female gymnast. Kaylia Nemour secured her spots directly for the games, by being among the highest-ranked eligible athlete in the all-around event, at the 2023 World Artistic Gymnastics Championships.

Women

Athlete	Event	Qualification						Final					
Athlete	Event	Apparatus				Total	Rank	Apparatus				Total	Rank
Athlete	Event	V	UB	BB	F	Total	Rank	V	UB	BB	F	Total	Rank
Kaylia Nemour	All-around	14.000	15.600	13.200	13.166	55.966	5 Q	14.033	15.533	13.233	13.100	55.899	5
Kaylia Nemour	Uneven bars	—N/a	15.600	—N/a		15.600	1 Q	—N/a	15.700	—N/a		15.700	1st place, gold medalist(s)

== Judo ==
Algeria qualified three judokas via the IJF World Ranking List and continental quotas in Africa.

Athlete	Event	Round of 64	Round of 32	Round of 16	Quarterfinals	Semifinals	Repechage	Final / BM	
Athlete	Event	Opposition Result	Opposition Result	Opposition Result	Opposition Result	Opposition Result	Opposition Result	Opposition Result	Rank
Messaoud Dris	Men's −73 kg	—N/a	Butbul (ISR); L DSQ	Did not advance					
Mohamed Lili	Men's +100 kg	—N/a	Magomedomarov (UAE); L 00–10	Did not advance					
Amina Belkadi	Women's −63 kg	—N/a	Barrios (VEN); W 01–00	Leški (SLO); L 01–10	Did not advance				

== Rowing ==
Algerian rowers qualified two boats, each in the men's and women's single sculls for the Games through the 2023 African Qualification Regatta in Tunis, Tunisia.

Athlete	Event	Heats		Repechage		Quarterfinals		Semifinals		Final	
Athlete	Event	Time	Rank	Time	Rank	Time	Rank	Time	Rank	Time	Rank
Sid Ali Boudina	Men's single sculls	7:02.94	4 R	7:10.23	1 QF	7:06.31	5 SC/D	6:57.06	3 FC	6:51.99	18
Nihed Benchadli	Women's single sculls	8:06.62	5 R	8:10.34	3 SE/F	Did not advance		8:34.67	1 FE	7:54.25	25

Qualification Legend: FA=Final A (medal); FB=Final B (non-medal); FC=Final C (non-medal); FD=Final D (non-medal); FE=Final E (non-medal); FF=Final F (non-medal); SA/B=Semifinals A/B; SC/D=Semifinals C/D; SE/F=Semifinals E/F; QF=Quarterfinals; R=Repechage

== Sailing ==
Algerian sailors qualified one boats in the following classes through the 2023 African Regatta in Soma Bay, Egypt.

Elimination events

Athlete	Event	Opening series																						Quarterfinal	Semifinal								Final							
Athlete	Event	1	2	3	4	5	6	7	8	9	10	11	12	13	14	15	16	17	18	19	20	Net points	Rank	Rank	1	2	3	4	5	6	Total	Rank	1	2	3	4	5	6	Total	Rank
Rami Boudrouma	Men's IQFoil	22	21	19	20	~~24~~	22	17	22	20	24	23	~~DNF~~	24	Cancelled							234	24	Did not advance																24

M = Medal race; EL = Eliminated – did not advance into the medal race

== Shooting ==
Algerian shooters achieved quota places for the following events based on their results at the 2022 and 2023 ISSF World Championships, 2023 African Championships, and 2024 ISSF World Olympic Qualification Tournament.

Athlete	Event	Qualification		Final	
Athlete	Event	Points	Rank	Points	Rank
Koceila Adoul	Men's 10 m air rifle	613.4	49	Did not advance	
Samir Bouchireb	Men's 10 m air pistol	563	29	Did not advance	
Houda Chaabi	Women's 10 m air rifle	DNS		Did not advance	

== Swimming ==
Algeria sent two swimmers to compete at the 2024 Paris Olympics.

Athlete	Event	Heat		Semifinal		Final	
Athlete	Event	Time	Rank	Time	Rank	Time	Rank
Jaouad Syoud	Men's 200 m medley	1:59.41	15 Q	2:00.13	15	Did not advance	
Nesrine Medjahed	Women's 100 m freestyle	57.34	24	Did not advance			

Qualifiers for the latter rounds (Q) of all events were decided on a time only basis, therefore positions shown are overall results versus competitors in all heats.

== Table tennis ==
Algeria entered two table tennis players into Paris 2024. Mehdi Bouloussa qualified for the games following the triumph of winning one of the four available quota places at the 2024 African Qualification Tournament in Kigali, Rwanda; meanwhile, Lynda Loghraibi qualified for the games through the African continental ranking.

Athlete	Event	Preliminary	Round of 64	Round of 32	Round of 16	Quarterfinals	Semifinals	Final / BM	
Athlete	Event	Opposition Result	Opposition Result	Opposition Result	Opposition Result	Opposition Result	Opposition Result	Opposition Result	Rank
Mehdi Bouloussa	Men's singles	Bye	Pucar (CRO); L 0–4	Did not advance					
Lynda Loghraibi	Women's singles	Bye	Chen (CHN); L 0–4	Did not advance					

== Weightlifting ==
Algeria entered one weightlifter into the Olympic competition. Walid Bidani (men's +102 kg) secured one of the top ten slots in his weight divisions based on the IWF Olympic Qualification Rankings.

Athlete	Event	Snatch		Clean & Jerk		Total	Rank
Athlete	Event	Result	Rank	Result	Rank	Total	Rank
Walid Bidani	Men's +102 kg	DNF					

== Wrestling ==
Algeria qualified eight wrestlers for Paris 2024. All of them qualified for the games following the triumph of advancing to the final round at 2024 African & Oceania Olympic Qualification Tournament in Alexandria, Egypt.

Key:

- VT (ranking points: 5–0 or 0–5) – Victory by fall.
- VB (ranking points: 5–0 or 0–5) – Victory by injury (VF for forfeit, VA for withdrawal or disqualification)
- PP (ranking points: 3–1 or 1–3) – Decision by points – the loser with technical points.
- PO (ranking points: 3–0 or 0–3) – Decision by points – the loser without technical points.
- ST (ranking points: 4–0 or 0–4) – Great superiority – the loser without technical points and a margin of victory of at least 8 (Greco-Roman) or 10 (freestyle) points.
- SP (ranking points: 4–1 or 1–4) – Technical superiority – the loser with technical points and a margin of victory of at least 8 (Greco-Roman) or 10 (freestyle) points.

Freestyle

Athlete	Event	Round of 16	Quarterfinal	Semifinal	Repechage	Final / BM	
Athlete	Event	Opposition Result	Opposition Result	Opposition Result	Opposition Result	Opposition Result	Rank
Fateh Benferdjallah	Men's −86 kg	Ishiguro (JPN); L 0–11 ^{ST}	Did not advance				14
Ibtissem Doudou	Women's −50 kg	Hildebrandt (USA); L 0–10 ^{ST}	Did not advance		Ziqi (CHN); L 0–10 ^{ST}	Did not advance	14
Chaimaa Fouzia Aouissi	Women's −57 kg	Adekuoroye (NGR); L 0–0 ^{VF}	Did not advance				13

Greco-Roman

Athlete	Event	Round of 16	Quarterfinals	Semifinals	Repechage	Final / BM	
Athlete	Event	Opposition Result	Opposition Result	Opposition Result	Opposition Result	Opposition Result	Rank
Abdelkarim Fergat	Men's −60 kg	Mohsennejad (IRI); L 0–9 ^{ST}	Did not advance				16
Ishak Ghaiou	Men's −67 kg	Esmaeili (IRI); L 0–10 ^{ST}	Did not advance		Orta (CUB); L 0–9 ^{ST}	Did not advance	16
Abdelkrim Ouakali	Men's −77 kg	Kusaka (JPN); L 0–9 ^{ST}	Did not advance		Vardanyan (UZB); L 0–11 ^{ST}	Did not advance	16
Bachir Sid Azara	Men's −87 kg	Gobadze (GEO); L 1–2 ^{PP}	Did not advance				12
Fadi Rouabah	Men's −97 kg	Savolainen (FIN); L 0–4 ^{PO}	Did not advance				16
