= Wrestling at the 2018 Summer Youth Olympics – Boys' freestyle 80 kg =

Boys' freestyle 80kg at the III Summer Youth Olympic Games
- Venue: Asia Pavilion
- Date: 14 October 2018
- Competitors: 6 from 6 nations

Medalists
1st place, gold medalist(s)		Akhmedkhan Tembotov; Russia
2nd place, silver medalist(s)		Fateh Benferdjallah; Algeria
3rd place, bronze medalist(s)		Mukhammadrasul Rakhimov; Uzbekistan

The boys' freestyle 80 kg competition at the 2018 Summer Youth Olympics was held on 14 October, at the Asia Pavilion.

== Competition format ==
As there were less than six wrestlers in a weight category, the pool phase will be run as a single group competing in a round-robin format. Ranking within the groups is used to determine the pairings for the final phase.

== Schedule ==
All times are in local time (UTC-3).

Date	Time	Round
Sunday, 14 October 2018	10:15; 10:40; 11:05; 18:05	Round 1 Round 2 Round 3 Finals

== Results ==
Legend

- F – Won by fall

Group Stages

Qualified for the Gold-medal match
Qualified for the Bronze-medal match
Qualified for the 5th/6th Place Match

Group A

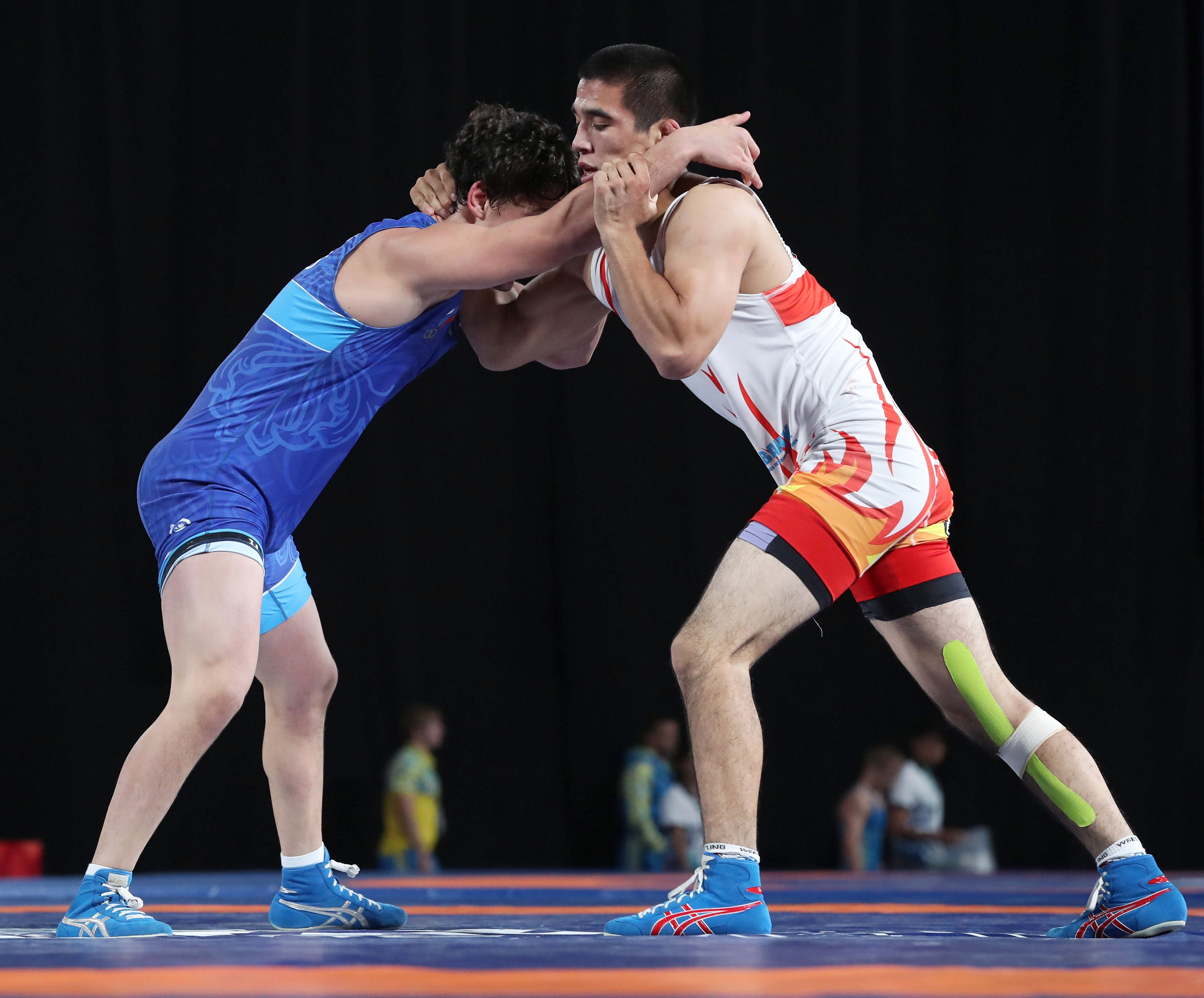
Mukhammadrasul Rakhimov vs. Akhmedkhan Tembotov

Pos	Athlete	Pld	W	L	CP	TP	Qualification
1	Akhmedkhan Tembotov (RUS)	2	2	0	7	19	Gold-medal match
2	Mukhammadrasul Rakhimov (UZB)	2	1	1	4	10	Bronze-medal match
3	Ryan Marshall (NZL)	2	0	2	0	0	Classification 5th/6th place match

Source: UWW

	Score		CP
Ryan Marshall (NZL)	0–10	Akhmedkhan Tembotov (RUS)	0–4 VSU
Mukhammadrasul Rakhimov (UZB)	10–0	Ryan Marshall (NZL)	4–0 VSU
Akhmedkhan Tembotov (RUS)	9–0	Mukhammadrasul Rakhimov (UZB)	3–0 VPO

Group B

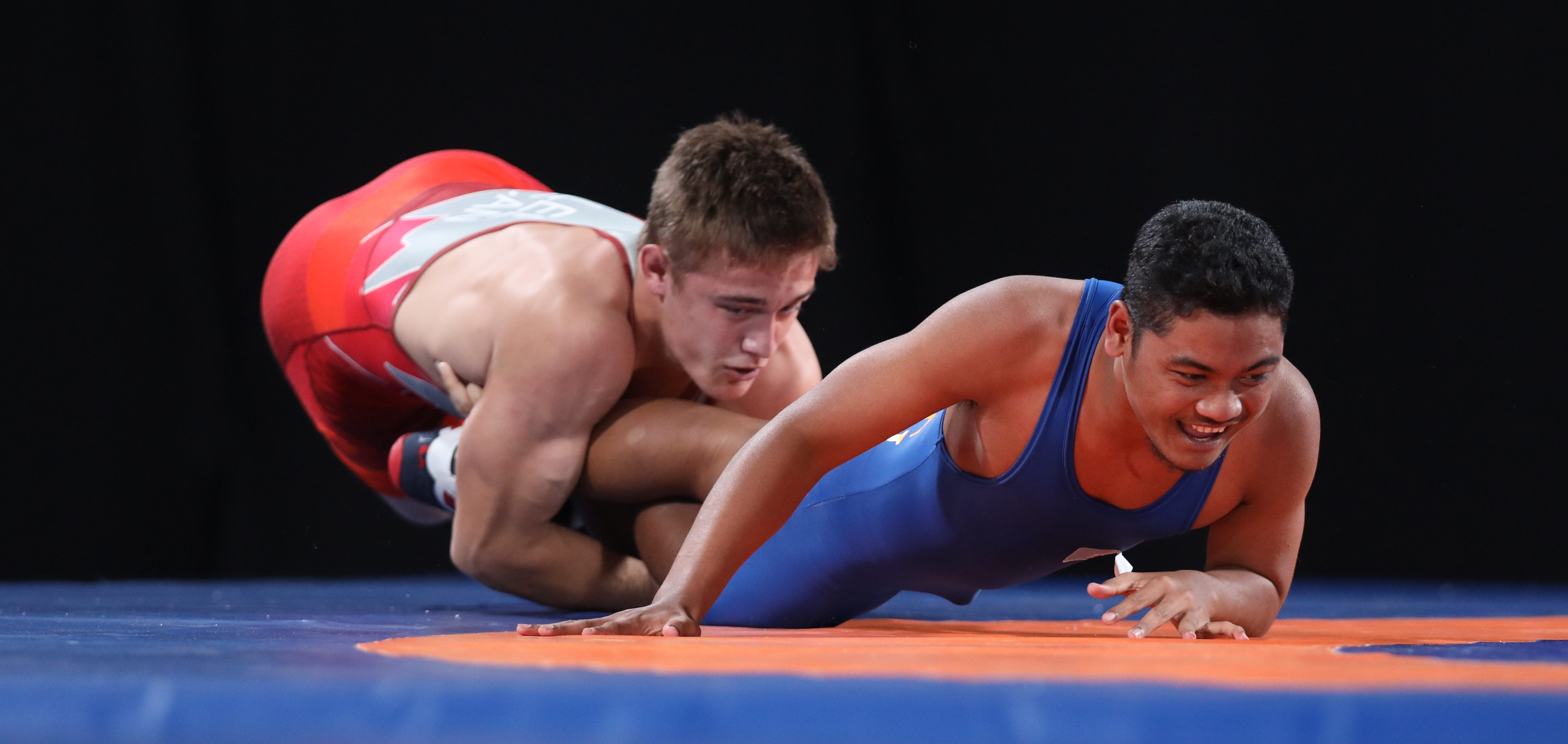
Carson Lee vs. Valentine Yairegpie

Pos	Athlete	Pld	W	L	CP	TP	Qualification
1	Fateh Benferdjallah (ALG)	2	2	0	7	18	Gold-medal match
2	Carson Lee (CAN)	2	1	1	5	18	Bronze-medal match
3	Valentine Yairegpie (FSM)	2	0	2	0	0	Classification 5th/6th place match

Source: UWW

	Score		CP
Fateh Benferdjallah (ALG)	10–0	Valentine Yairegpie (FSM)	4–0 VSU
Carson Lee (CAN)	7–8	Fateh Benferdjallah (ALG)	1–3 VPO1
Valentine Yairegpie (FSM)	0–11	Carson Lee (CAN)	0–4 VSU

=== Finals ===
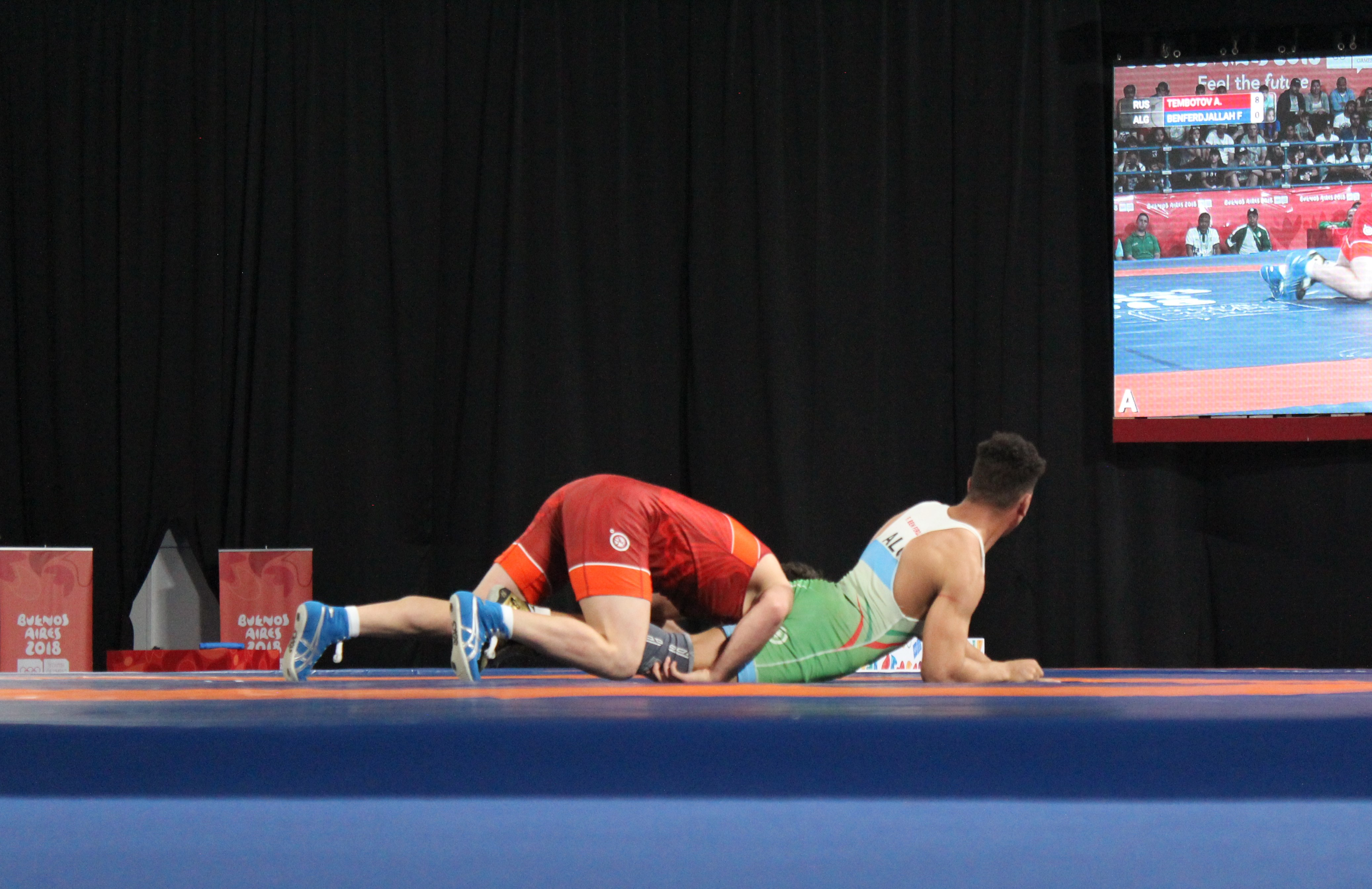
Akhmedkhan Tembotov vs. Fateh Benferdjallah

Gold-medal match
Akhmedkhan Tembotov (RUS)	10
Fateh Benferdjallah (ALG)	0

Bronze-medal match
Mukhammadrasul Rakhimov (UZB)	10
Carson Lee (CAN)	0

Classification 5th/6th place match
Ryan Marshall (NZL)	4^{F}
Valentine Yairegpie (FSM)	0

== Final rankings ==
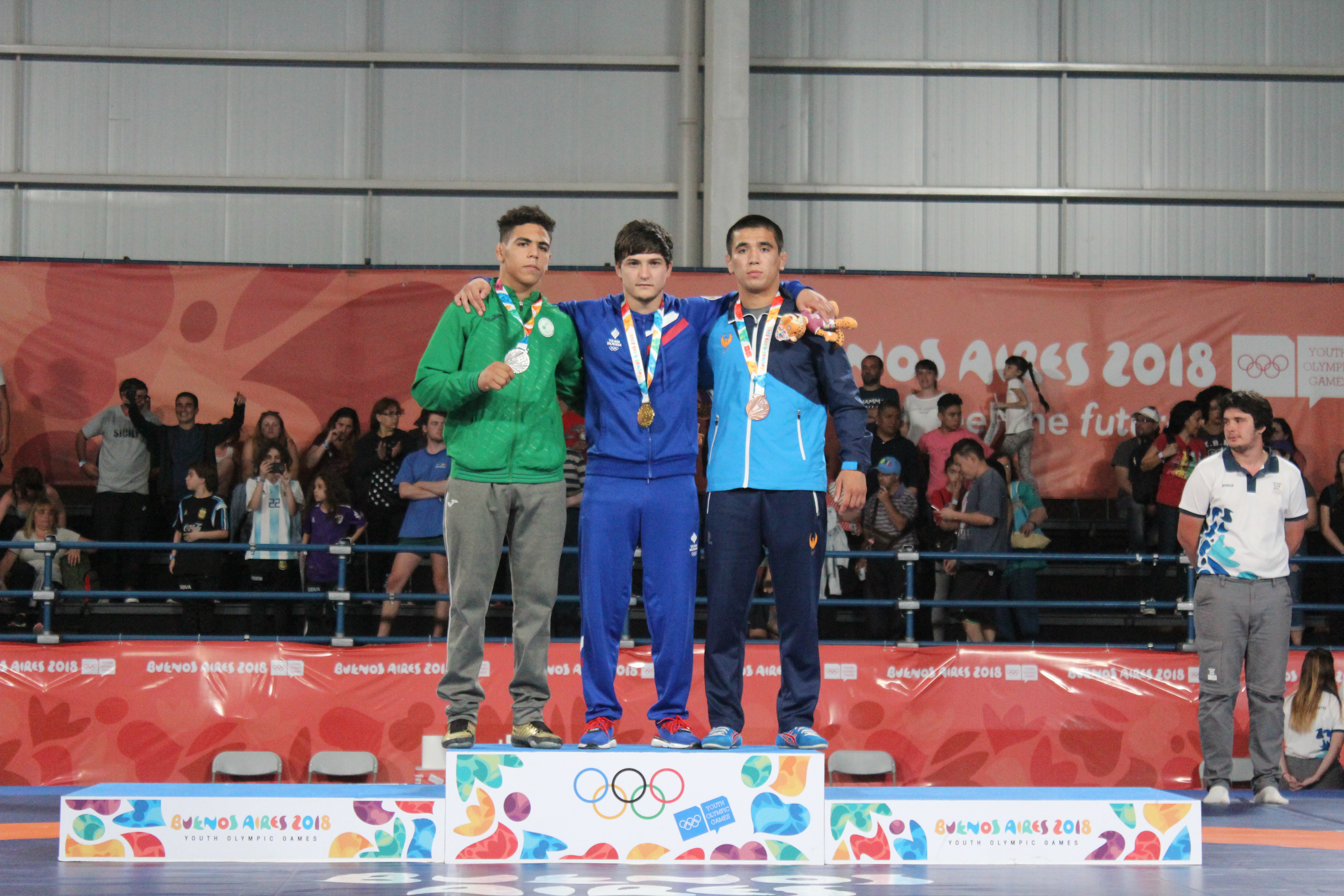
Medal Ceremony

Rank	Athlete
1st place, gold medalist(s)	Akhmedkhan Tembotov (RUS)
2nd place, silver medalist(s)	Fateh Benferdjallah (ALG)
3rd place, bronze medalist(s)	Mukhammadrasul Rakhimov (UZB)
4	Carson Lee (CAN)
5	Ryan Marshall (NZL)
6	Valentine Yairegpie (FSM)
