= 2025 European Wrestling Championships – Men's freestyle 125 kg =

Wrestling competition

Men's freestyle 125 kg at the 2025 European Wrestling Championships
- Venue: X-Bionic Sphere
- Location: Bratislava, Slovakia
- Dates: 8-9 April
- Competitors: 15

Medalists
gold medal	Giorgi Meshvildishvili	Azerbaijan
silver medal	Solomon Manashvili	Georgia
bronze medal	Dzianis Khramiankou
bronze medal	Kamil Kościółek	Poland

The men's freestyle 125 kg is a competition featured at the 2025 European Wrestling Championships, and was held in Bratislava, Slovakia on April 8 and 9.

== Results ==
Legend

- F — Won by fall

Round of 16
Vladislav Baitcaev (HUN)	8
Georgi Ivanov (BUL)	2
Dzianis Khramiankou (UWW)	10
Adam Jakšík (SVK)	0
Mohsen Siyar (GER)	8
Zelimkhan Khizriev (UWW)	8
Solomon Manashvili (GEO)	6
Gheorghe Erhan (MDA)	2
Murazi Mchedlidze (UKR)	0
Azamat Khosonov (GRE)	3
Omar Sarem (ROU)	1
Johannes Ludescher (AUT)	2
Hakan Büyükçıngıl (TUR)	0
Kamil Kościółek (POL)	5

Quarterfinals
Giorgi Meshvildishvili (AZE)	5
Vladislav Baitcaev (HUN)	0
Dzianis Khramiankou (UWW)	7
Zelimkhan Khizriev (UWW)	3
Solomon Manashvili (GEO)	3
Azamat Khosonov (GRE)	1
Johannes Ludescher (AUT)	0
Kamil Kościółek (POL)	11

Semifinals
Giorgi Meshvildishvili (AZE)	8
Dzianis Khramiankou (UWW)	5
Solomon Manashvili (GEO)	8
Kamil Kościółek (POL)	3

Final
Giorgi Meshvildishvili (AZE)	7
Solomon Manashvili (GEO)	7

Repechage round 1
Gheorghe Erhan (MDA)	2
Azamat Khosonov (GRE)	9

Bronze medal match
Vladislav Baitcaev (HUN)	2
Dzianis Khramiankou (UWW)	5
Azamat Khosonov (GRE)	0
Kamil Kościółek (POL)	8

== Final standing ==
Rank	Athlete
1st place, gold medalist(s)	Giorgi Meshvildishvili (AZE)
2nd place, silver medalist(s)	Solomon Manashvili (GEO)
3rd place, bronze medalist(s)	Dzianis Khramiankou (UWW)
3rd place, bronze medalist(s)	Kamil Kościółek (POL)
5	Vladislav Baitcaev (HUN)
5	Azamat Khosonov (GRE)
7	Zelimkhan Khizriev (UWW)
8	Johannes Ludescher (AUT)
9	Gheorghe Erhan (MDA)
10	Mohsen Siyar (GER)
11	Georgi Ivanov (BUL)
12	Omar Sarem (ROU)
13	Murazi Mchedlidze (UKR)
14	Hakan Büyükçıngıl (TUR)
15	Adam Jakšík (SVK)
