= Akhmedkhan Tembotov =

Russian freestyle wrestler (born 2002)

Akhmedkhan Tembotov Ахмедхан Темботов
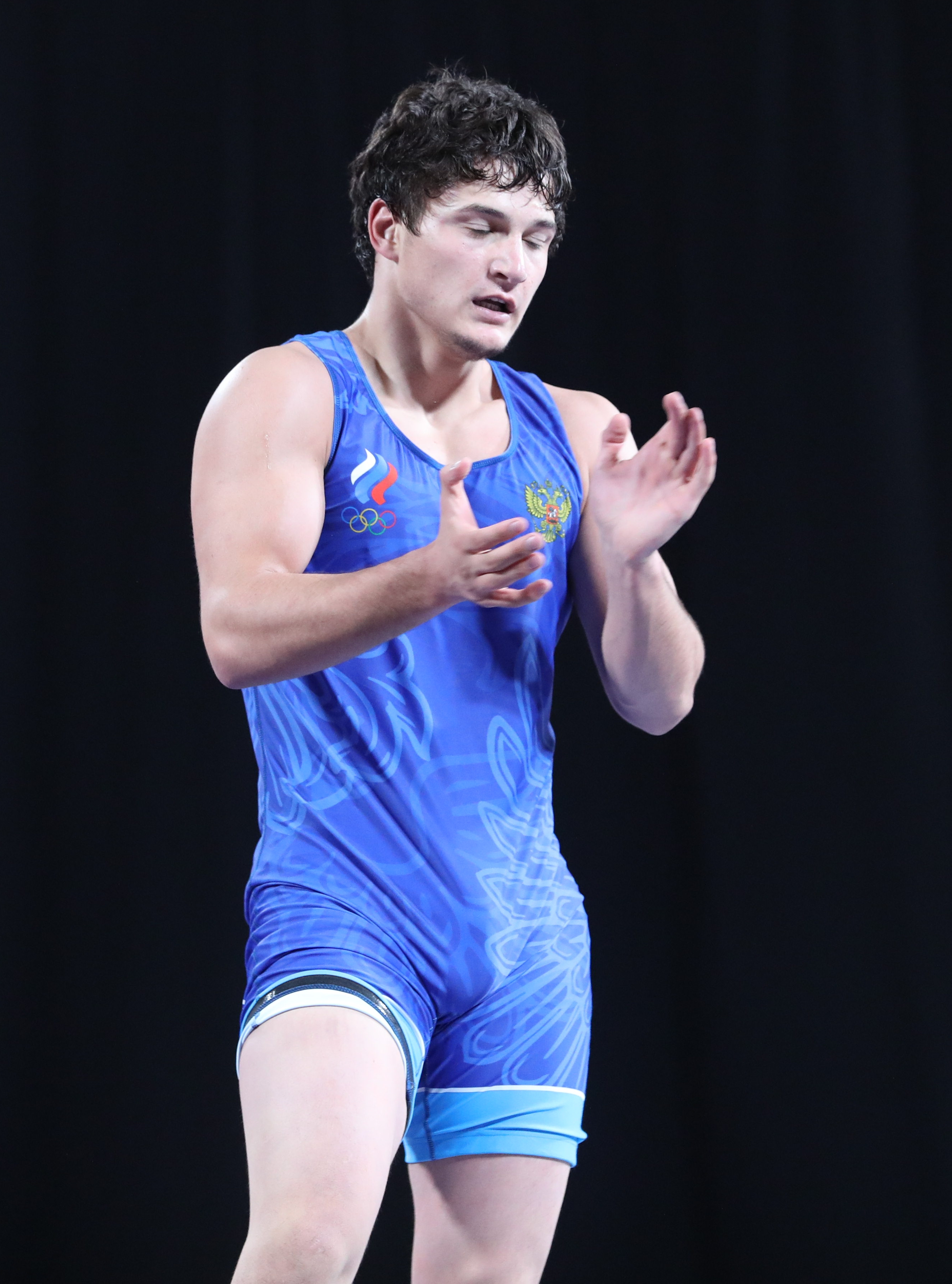
- Tembotov at the 2018 Summer Youth Olympics

Personal information
- Native name: Russian: Ахмедхан Анатольевич Темботов
- Full name: Akhmedkhan Anatolevich Tembotov
- Nationality: Russian; Italian
- Born: 13 September 2002 (age 24) Atazhukino village, Kabardino-Balkaria, Russia

Sport
- Country: Russia (2017—2022); Italy (2022—present)
- Sport: Wrestling
- Weight class: 86kg
- Rank: Master of sports
- Event: Freestyle
- Club: "Mandraccio Roma" (Rome)
- Coached by: Anzor Tembotov; Ignat Grek
Medal record
Men's freestyle wrestling
Representing Russia
Youth Olympic Games
Gold medal – first place	2018 Buenos Aires	80 kg
World Cadet Championships
Gold medal – first place	2018 Skopje	80 kg
Gold medal – first place	2019 Roma	80 kg

Akhmedkhan Anatolevich Tembotov (Russian: Ахмедхан Анатольевич Темботов, Italian: Akhmedkhan Tembotov; born 13 September 2002) is a Russian-born Italian freestyle wrestler of Circassian-Kabardian descent. 2018 Youth Olympics gold medalist. 2023 senior Italian champion.

== Background ==
Akhmedkhan was born and raised in Kabardino-Balkaria, Russia. He started wrestling at age of 8. In high school years, he represented the Republic of Crimea and Kabardino-Balkaria in national championships. Also, he trained in the Olympic training center No.1 in Moscow.

== Sport career ==
He was 2017 U16 National and U16 European champion at 85 kilos. In 2018, he came first at the Cadet European Championships in North Macedonia and claimed the 2018 Youth Summer Olympic gold medal at 80 kilograms for the Russian Federation. In 2019, was runner-up at the Russian cadet championships and won the second cadet European title at 80 kilos in Rome, Italy. In 2020, he earned the silver medal at the Matteo Pellicone ranking series international tournament. In 2023, Tembotov won the senior Italian national championships at 86 kilos.

== Wrestling Achievements ==
- Senior level:
  - 2020 Matteo Pellicone ranking series – 2nd.
  - 2023 Italian Championships – 1st.
- Cadet level:
  - 2018 Summer Youth Olympics – 1st.
  - 2018 European Cadet Championships – 1st.
  - 2019 Russian Cadet Championships – 2nd.
  - 2019 European Cadet Championships – 1st.
