= Kamil Kościółek =

Polish freestyle wrestler (born 1996)

Personal information
- Native name: Kamil Tomasz Kościółek
- Nationality: Polish
- Born: August 2, 1996 (age 29) Rzeszów, Poland
- Weight: 125 kg (276 lb)

Sport
- Country: Poland
- Sport: Freestyle wrestling
- Event: Men's freestyle
- Club: Stal Rzeszów
Medal record
Men's freestyle wrestling
Representing Poland
European Championships
Bronze medal – third place	2025 Bratislava	125 kg
Grand Prix
Gold medal – first place	2015 Yakutsk	125 kg
Gold medal – first place	2019 Nice	125 kg
Gold medal – first place	2021 Kiev	125 kg
Silver medal – second place	2021 Kaspisk	125 kg
Silver medal – second place	2022 Madrid	125 kg
Silver medal – second place	2023 Alexandria	125 kg
Silver medal – second place	2024 Warsaw	125 kg
Silver medal – second place	2024 Madrid	125 kg
Silver medal – second place	2026 Budapest	125 kg
Bronze medal – third place	2016 Madrid	125 kg
Bronze medal – third place	2018 Warsaw	125 kg
Bronze medal – third place	2020 Kiev	125 kg
Bronze medal – third place	2021 Nice	125 kg
Bronze medal – third place	2022 Rome	125 kg
Bronze medal – third place	2022 Warsaw	125 kg
Bronze medal – third place	2023 Warsaw	125 kg
Bronze medal – third place	2025 Tirana	125 kg
Bronze medal – third place	2026 Tirana	125 kg
Bronze medal – third place	2026 Ulaanbaatar	125 kg
European U20 Championships
Gold medal – first place	2022 Plovdiv	125 kg

Kamil Kościółek (born 2 August 1996) is a Polish freestyle wrestler competing in the 125 kg weight class. He won the bronze medal at the 2025 European Wrestling Championships and previously became European U20 Champion in 2022.

== Career ==
In April 2025, Kamil Kościółek won one of the bronze medals in the men's freestyle 125 kg event at the 2025 European Wrestling Championships held in Bratislava, Slovakia. He lost in the semifinal to Georgia's Solomon Manashvili, but defeated Azamat Khosonov of Greece 3–0 in the bronze medal match.

He also appeared on the final list of medalists published by independent outlets such as Sportaran.

According to United World Wrestling, he closed the 2025 season ranked 9th in the senior world ranking for the 125 kg category, with a season record of 7 wins and 4 losses.
