= Gaku Akazawa =

Japanese and Samoan wrestler (born 1990)

Personal information
- Nationality: Samoan (after 2023); Japanese (before 2023)
- Born: June 1990 (age 36) Tokyo, Japan
- Education: Nihon University
- Spouse: Sinavalley Akazawa (m. 2018)
- Parents: Akiyasu Akazawa ( Father ) & Naoko Akazawa ( Mother )

Sport
- Country: Samoa
- Sport: Wrestling
- Weight class: 65 kg
- Event: Freestyle

Gaku Akazawa (Japanese: 赤澤岳, romanized: Akazawa Gaku; born June 1990) is a Japanese and Samoan wrestler. He qualified to represent Samoa at the 2024 Summer Olympics.

== Life and career ==
Akazawa was born in Tokyo in June 1990. He initially competed in kendo growing up, before beginning wrestling in sixth grade. He won national championships both in junior high school and at Hanasaki Tokuharu High School. He attended Nihon University, but suffered multiple injuries while competing there, requiring surgeries on both shoulders which ended his hopes of qualifying for the 2012 Summer Olympics.

After Akazawa graduated from Nihon University, he spent several years training in Russia but missed out on qualifying for the 2016 Summer Olympics. Still pursuing his childhood dream of making the Olympics, he thought that changing nationalities would give him a better chance of making it for the next Olympics. He recalled that one of his junior high school teachers had taught judo in Samoa and got in contact with him.

Akazawa moved to Samoa in June 2017 and continued training; United World Wrestling noted that he became one of "about 10 wrestlers over the age of 14 in the entire country," as rugby is the most popular sport. He opened a gym there, where he teaches the sport. After marrying a woman he met in Samoa in 2018, he set up a massage parlor, which became popular locally. He tried to make the 2020 Summer Olympics but was unable to gain Samoan citizenship in time. Akazawa obtained Samoan citizenship in December 2023. He competed at the 2024 African & Oceania Wrestling Olympic Qualification Tournament and won over his opponent from Guinea-Bissau to qualify for the 2024 Summer Olympics.
