= Mia-Lahnee Aquino =

Guamanian freestyle wrestler (born 1998)

Personal information
- Nationality: Guamanian
- Born: March 29, 1998 (age 28)
- Height: 157 cm (5 ft 2 in)
- Weight: 53 kg (117 lb)

Sport
- Sport: Amateur wrestling
- Event: Freestyle wrestling

Mia-Lahnee Aquino (born 29 March 1998) is a Guamanian freestyle wrestler who competes in the 53 kg division. Aquino represented Guam at the 2024 Summer Olympics in Paris, finishing 16th in the women's 53 kg event. She also placed 18th at the 2023 World Wrestling Championships.
