= Diaaeldin Kamal =

Egyptian freestyle wrestler

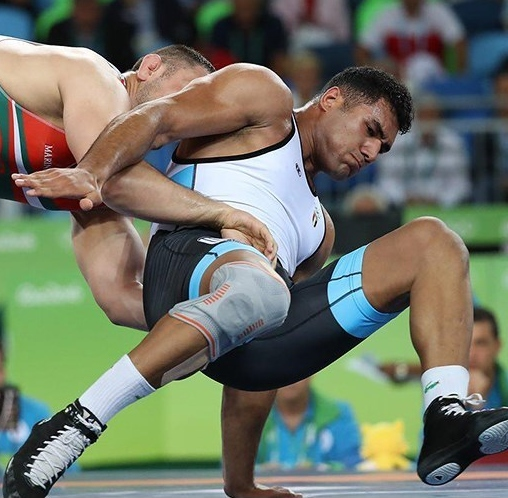
- Kamal at the 2016 Olympics

Personal information
- Full name: Diaaeldin Kamal Gouda Abdelmottaleb
- Born: 2 May 1993 (age 33)
- Height: 193 cm (6 ft 4 in)
- Weight: 125 kg (276 lb)

Sport
- Country: Egypt
- Sport: Freestyle wrestling
Medal record
African Wrestling Championships
Gold medal – first place	2015 Alexandria	125 kg
Gold medal – first place	2016 Alexandria	125 kg
Gold medal – first place	2017 Marrakesh	125 kg
Gold medal – first place	2020 Algiers	125 kg
Gold medal – first place	2023 Hammamet	125 kg
African Games
Bronze medal – third place	2015 Brazzaville	125 kg
Grand Prix
Bronze medal – third place	2024 Warsaw	125 kg
Arab Championships
Silver medal – second place	2012 Cairo	120 kg
Bronze medal – third place	2022 Alexandria	125 kg

Diaaeldin Kamal Gouda Abdelmottaleb (Arabic: ضياء الدين كمال جودة عبد المطلب, born 2 May 1993) is a heavyweight freestyle wrestler from Egypt. In 2016, he won the African Championships and competed at the Rio Olympics, losing in the second bout to Komeil Ghasemi.

He qualified at the 2021 African & Oceania Wrestling Olympic Qualification Tournament to represent Egypt at the 2020 Summer Olympics in Tokyo, Japan.

He competed in the men's 125 kg event at the 2024 Summer Olympics in Paris, France.
