= Chaimaa Aouissi =

Algerian freestyle wrestler (born 1997)

Personal information
- Full name: Chaimaa Fouzia Aouissi
- Nationality: Algerian
- Born: 18 June 1997 (age 29) Oran, Algeria
- Height: 163 cm (5 ft 4 in)
- Weight: 57 kg (126 lb)

Sport
- Sport: Amateur wrestling
- Event: Freestyle wrestling
Medal record
African Championships
Gold medal – first place	2025 Casablanca	57 kg
Silver medal – second place	2024 Alexandria	57 kg
Arab Championships
Gold medal – first place	2024 Tunis	57 kg

Chaimaa Fouzia Aouissi (Arabic: شيماء عويس; born 18 June 1997) is an Algerian freestyle wrestler who competes in the 57 kg division.

== Career ==
Aouisse represented Algeria at the 2024 Summer Olympics in Paris, finishing 13th in the women's 57 kg event. She became African champion in 2025 (Casablanca) and won silver in 2024 (Alexandria). She also took gold at the 2024 Arab Wrestling Championships in Tunis and silver at the 2018 Mediterranean Wrestling Championships in Algiers.
