= Fateh Benferdjallah =

Algerian freestyle wrestler

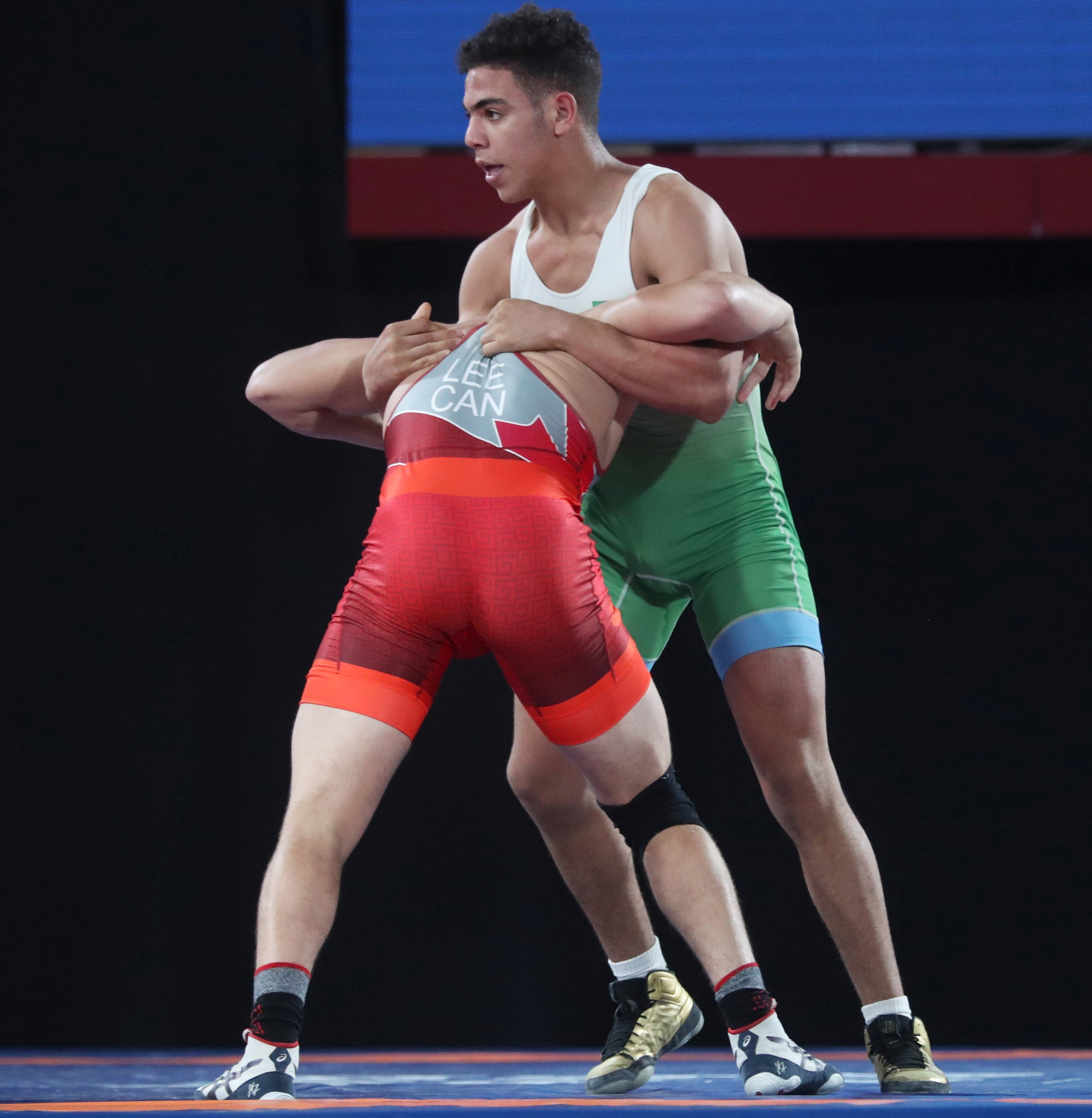
- Benferdjallah at the 2018 Summer Youth Olympics

Personal information
- Born: 15 April 2001 (age 25)

Sport
- Country: Algeria
- Sport: Amateur wrestling
- Event: Freestyle
Medal record
Men's freestyle wrestling
Representing Algeria
African Games
Silver medal – second place	2019 Rabat	86 kg
African Championships
Gold medal – first place	2022 El Jadida	86 kg
Gold medal – first place	2023 Hammamet	86 kg
Silver medal – second place	2019 Hammamet	79 kg
Bronze medal – third place	2020 Algiers	86 kg
World Military Championships
Bronze medal – third place	2025 Warendorf	86 kg
Youth Olympic Games
Silver medal – second place	2018 Buenos Aires	80 kg

Fateh Benferdjallah (born 15 April 2001) is an Algerian freestyle wrestler. He represented Algeria at the 2019 African Games held in Rabat, Morocco and he won the silver medal in the men's freestyle 86 kg event. In the final, he lost against Ayoub Barraj of Tunisia.

== Career ==
In 2018, he won the silver medal in the boys' freestyle 80 kg event at the Summer Youth Olympics held in Buenos Aires, Argentina.

At the 2019 African Wrestling Championships held in Hammamet, Tunisia, he won the silver medal in the 79 kg event. In 2020, he won one of the bronze medals in the 86 kg event at the African Wrestling Championships held in Algiers, Algeria. He qualified at the 2021 African & Oceania Wrestling Olympic Qualification Tournament to represent Algeria at the 2020 Summer Olympics in Tokyo, Japan. He competed in the men's 86 kg event where he was eliminated in his first match by Stefan Reichmuth of Switzerland.

He won the gold medal in his event at the 2022 African Wrestling Championships held in El Jadida, Morocco. He lost his bronze medal match in the 86 kg event at the 2022 Mediterranean Games held in Oran, Algeria.

He competed in the men's freestyle 86 kg event at the 2024 Summer Olympics in Paris, France.

== Achievements ==
Year	Tournament	Location	Result	Event
2019	African Wrestling Championships	Hammamet, Tunisia	2nd	Freestyle 79 kg
2019	African Games	Rabat, Morocco	2nd	Freestyle 86 kg
2020	African Wrestling Championships	Algiers, Algeria	3rd	Freestyle 86 kg
2022	African Wrestling Championships	El Jadida, Morocco	1st	Freestyle 86 kg
2023	African Wrestling Championships	Hammamet, Tunisia	1st	Freestyle 86 kg
