= 2025 European U20 Wrestling Championships – Women's freestyle =

The Women's freestyle competitions at the 2025 European U20 Wrestling Championships were held in Caorle, Italy between 2 and 4 July 2025.

== Women's freestyle ==
=== 50 kg ===
2 and 3 July

Legend

- F — Won by fall
- WO — Won by walkover

Main bracket

Round of 16
Violetta Biriukova (UWW)	13
Mariia Nemish (UKR)	2
Réka Hegedüs (SVK)	0
Kseniya Kostsenich (UWW)	8
Lonisa Reka (KOS)	15
Maya Johansson (SWE)	10
Laura Fáth (HUN)	11^{F}
Nil Aktaş (TUR)	1
Adriana Danisevičiūtė (LTU)	0
Eliza Gonța (MDA)	10
Olivia van Kleunen (NED)	WO
~~Elvina Karimzada (AZE)~~
Josephine Wrensch (GER)	5
Karolina Zień (POL)	3

Quarterfinals
Alice Faccio (ITA)	0
Violetta Biriukova (UWW)	10
Kseniya Kostsenich (UWW)	11
Lonisa Reka (KOS)	0
Laura Fáth (HUN)	4^{F}
Eliza Gonța (MDA)	0
Olivia van Kleunen (NED)	0
Josephine Wrensch (GER)	7

Semifinals
Violetta Biriukova (UWW)	0
Kseniya Kostsenich (UWW)	10
Laura Fáth (HUN)	6
Josephine Wrensch (GER)	7

Final
Kseniya Kostsenich (UWW)	8
Josephine Wrensch (GER)	2

Repechage round
Réka Hegedüs (SVK)	10
Lonisa Reka (KOS)	0
Karolina Zień (POL)	1
Olivia van Kleunen (NED)	2

Bronze medals
Réka Hegedüs (SVK)	0
Violetta Biriukova (UWW)	9
Olivia van Kleunen (NED)	1
Laura Fáth (HUN)	2

=== 53 kg ===
3 and 4 July

Legend

- F — Won by fall

Main bracket

Round of 16
Vasilena Ilieva (BUL)	0
Ilona Valchuk (POL)	4^{F}
Sofia Michailidou (GRE)	0
Valeryia Tsitova (UWW)	8^{F}
Corina Bostan (MDA)	0
Angela Casarola (ITA)	11
Ekaterina Chikanova (UWW)	5
Ana Rotaru (ROU)	4
Ami Olsson (SWE)	2
Liliána Kapuvári (HUN)	8
Lisette Böttker (EST)	0
Anastasiia Polska (UKR)	10
Maëlyss Rousselet (FRA)	5
Şevval Çayır (TUR)	15^{F}

Quarterfinals
Doruntina Nezaj (KOS)	0
Ilona Valchuk (POL)	12
Valeryia Tsitova (UWW)	6
Angela Casarola (ITA)	4^{F}
Ekaterina Chikanova (UWW)	10
Liliána Kapuvári (HUN)	2
Anastasiia Polska (UKR)	8
Şevval Çayır (TUR)	6

Semifinals
Ilona Valchuk (POL)	6
Angela Casarola (ITA)	0
Ekaterina Chikanova (UWW)	2
Anastasiia Polska (UKR)	4^{F}

Final
Ilona Valchuk (POL)	0
Anastasiia Polska (UKR)	8^{F}

Repechage round
Vasilena Ilieva (BUL)	0
Doruntina Nezaj (KOS)	4^{F}
Lisette Böttker (EST)	4
Şevval Çayır (TUR)	14

Bronze medals
Doruntina Nezaj (KOS)	2
Angela Casarola (ITA)	13
Şevval Çayır (TUR)	14
Ekaterina Chikanova (UWW)	11

=== 55 kg ===
2 and 3 July

Legend

- F — Won by fall

Main bracket

Round of 16
Lilya Cohen (FRA)	6
Diana Kotvytska (UKR)	4
Alexandra Voiculescu (ROU)	4
Tuba Demir (TUR)	6
Fabiana Rinella (ITA)	15
Natalia Gorlova (UWW)	9
Amelia Tomala (POL)	6
Sara Rantonen (FIN)	2
Valeryia Mikitsich (UWW)	10
Nesrin Syuleymanova (BUL)	0
Ivana Gajić (SRB)	2
Pau Gimeno (ESP)	5
Katharina Krupna (GER)	1
Anja Epp (SUI)	6

Quarterfinals
Gerda Terék (HUN)	11
Lilya Cohen (FRA)	0
Tuba Demir (TUR)	3
Fabiana Rinella (ITA)	4
Amelia Tomala (POL)	6
Valeryia Mikitsich (UWW)	9
Pau Gimeno (ESP)	0
Anja Epp (SUI)	2^{F}

Semifinals
Gerda Terék (HUN)	4
Fabiana Rinella (ITA)	1
Valeryia Mikitsich (UWW)	12
Anja Epp (SUI)	0

Final
Gerda Terék (HUN)	7^{F}
Valeryia Mikitsich (UWW)	0

Repechage round
Nesrin Syuleymanova (BUL)	2
Amelia Tomala (POL)	9

Bronze medals
Lilya Cohen (FRA)	0
Fabiana Rinella (ITA)	10
Amelia Tomala (POL)	5
Anja Epp (SUI)	0

=== 57 kg ===
3 and 4 July

Legend

- F — Won by fall

Main bracket

Round of 16
Gular Habibova (AZE)	0
Anna Köblő (HUN)	10
Albina Kliefas (UKR)	5
Darya Ilyasevich (UWW)	5
Jana Petrović (SRB)	6
Sofia Pira (ITA)	2
Özlem Gürsoy (TUR)	0
Dolzhon Tsyngueva (UWW)	4^{F}
Ecaterina Lapina (MDA)	0
Inna Alimova (LTU)	2^{F}
Felicitas Domajeva (NOR)	11^{F}
Nicola Wasilewska (POL)	0

Quarterfinals
Tindra Dalmyr (SWE)	10
Anna Köblő (HUN)	0
Darya Ilyasevich (UWW)	11
Jana Petrović (SRB)	0
Dolzhon Tsyngueva (UWW)	11
Inna Alimova (LTU)	3
Felicitas Domajeva (NOR)	11
Csilla van Os (NED)	0

Semifinals
Tindra Dalmyr (SWE)	3
Darya Ilyasevich (UWW)	2
Dolzhon Tsyngueva (UWW)	0
Felicitas Domajeva (NOR)	10

Final
Tindra Dalmyr (SWE)	4
Felicitas Domajeva (NOR)	6

Repechage round
Nicola Wasilewska (POL)	4
Csilla van Os (NED)	14

Bronze medals
Anna Köblő (HUN)	3
Darya Ilyasevich (UWW)	12^{F}
Csilla van Os (NED)	1
Dolzhon Tsyngueva (UWW)	12

=== 59 kg ===
2 and 3 July

Legend

- F — Won by fall

Main bracket

Round of 16
Mariia Miziurko (UKR)	10^{F}
Frida Christiansen (DEN)	4
Franziska Blaumeiser (GER)	0
Hiunai Hurbanova (AZE)	10
Amelia Samuelsson (SWE)	4^{F}
Denise Piroddu (ITA)	0
Marta Hetmanava (UWW)	10
Mădălina Prisacari (MDA)	0
Sevim Akbaş (TUR)	10
Desislava Ivanova (BUL)	0
Éda Balázs (HUN)	0
Anna Tieliegina (LTU)	3^{F}
Rosa Molina (ESP)	17
Nikola Piechocka (POL)	6
Elena Kurova (UWW)	4^{F}
Petra Mráčková (CZE)	0

Quarterfinals
Mariia Miziurko (UKR)	4
Hiunai Hurbanova (AZE)	8^{F}
Amelia Samuelsson (SWE)	2
Marta Hetmanava (UWW)	5
Sevim Akbaş (TUR)	11
Anna Tieliegina (LTU)	2
Rosa Molina (ESP)	1
Elena Kurova (UWW)	6

Semifinals
Hiunai Hurbanova (AZE)	11
Marta Hetmanava (UWW)	0
Sevim Akbaş (TUR)	6
Elena Kurova (UWW)	2

Final
Hiunai Hurbanova (AZE)	9
Sevim Akbaş (TUR)	1

Repechage round
Franziska Blaumeiser (GER)	0
Mariia Miziurko (UKR)	11
Desislava Ivanova (BUL)	4
Anna Tieliegina (LTU)	2^{F}

Bronze medals
Mariia Miziurko (UKR)	2
Marta Hetmanava (UWW)	13
Anna Tieliegina (LTU)	0
Elena Kurova (UWW)	8

=== 62 kg ===
3 and 4 July

Legend

- C — Won by 3 cautions given to the opponent
- F — Won by fall

Final

Final
Leonie Steigert (GER)	3
Ruzanna Mammadova (AZE)	4

Top half

Qualification
Leonie Steigert (GER)	12
Ivena Bliznakova (BUL)	2

Round of 16
Foteini Nalmpanti (GRE)	3
Nella Honkaniemi (FIN)	4
Leonie Steigert (GER)	11^{F}
Alessia Casalino (ITA)	0
Gabriela Rudoi (MDA)	10
Marijana Šumski (CRO)	0
Maša Perović (SRB)	1
Selma Nord (SWE)	10

Quarterfinals
Nella Honkaniemi (FIN)	5
Leonie Steigert (GER)	13
Gabriela Rudoi (MDA)	11
Selma Nord (SWE)	0

Semifinals
Leonie Steigert (GER)	10
Gabriela Rudoi (MDA)	0

Bottom half

Qualification

Round of 16
Ekaterina Radysheva (UWW)	4
Anna Karbovska (UKR)	1
Dilan Tan (TUR)	4^{F}
Maja Nowakowska (POL)	1
Tereza Mráčková (CZE)	0
Ruzanna Mammadova (AZE)	8^{F}
Marija Cvetanova (MKD)	0
Karyna Fishchuk (UWW)	10

Quarterfinals
Ekaterina Radysheva (UWW)	4
Dilan Tan (TUR)	1
Ruzanna Mammadova (AZE)	4^{C}
Karyna Fishchuk (UWW)	0

Semifinals
Ekaterina Radysheva (UWW)	2
Ruzanna Mammadova (AZE)	3

Repechage round 1
Ivena Bliznakova (BUL)	0
Alessia Casalino (ITA)	4^{F}

Repechage round 2
Alessia Casalino (ITA)	2
Nella Honkaniemi (FIN)	4
Tereza Mráčková (CZE)	0
Karyna Fishchuk (UWW)	5^{F}

Bronze medals
Nella Honkaniemi (FIN)	0
Gabriela Rudoi (MDA)	11
Karyna Fishchuk (UWW)	0
Ekaterina Radysheva (UWW)	4

=== 65 kg ===
3 and 4 July

Legend

- F — Won by fall

Main bracket

Round of 16
Saga Svensson (SWE)	8^{F}
Melani Mitevska (MKD)	0
Sara Ahmedova (BUL)	0
Beyza Nur Akkuş (TUR)	10
Annalena Pohl (GER)	3
Viktória Pupp (HUN)	5
Manuela Cervoni (ITA)	1
Natalia Zaręba (POL)	7
Iryna Borysiuk (UKR)	0
Margarita Salnazarian (UWW)	10
Karalina Papova (UWW)	2
Mirijam Hansen (NOR)	7
Emilija Jakovljević (SRB)	11
Jolana Ratajová (CZE)	0
Viktória Földešiová (SVK)	4
Sabina Petrache (ROU)	5

Quarterfinals
Saga Svensson (SWE)	2
Beyza Nur Akkuş (TUR)	6
Viktória Pupp (HUN)	10
Natalia Zaręba (POL)	0
Margarita Salnazarian (UWW)	10
Mirijam Hansen (NOR)	0
Emilija Jakovljević (SRB)	4^{F}
Sabina Petrache (ROU)	0

Semifinals
Beyza Nur Akkuş (TUR)	10
Viktória Pupp (HUN)	0
Margarita Salnazarian (UWW)	2^{F}
Emilija Jakovljević (SRB)	0

Final
Beyza Nur Akkuş (TUR)	4
Margarita Salnazarian (UWW)	4

Repechage round
Sara Ahmedova (BUL)	0
Saga Svensson (SWE)	8^{F}
Iryna Borysiuk (UKR)	6
Mirijam Hansen (NOR)	3

Bronze medals
Saga Svensson (SWE)	6^{F}
Viktória Pupp (HUN)	0
Iryna Borysiuk (UKR)	8
Emilija Jakovljević (SRB)	1

=== 68 kg ===
2 and 3 July

Legend

- F — Won by fall

Final

Final
Zlatoslava Stepanova (UWW)	0
Oleksandra Rybak (UKR)	4^{F}

Top half

Round of 32
Lorena Duraj (KOS)	12^{F}
Stefani Nikolova (MKD)	4

Round of 16
Melina Samsonsen (NOR)	4
Zlatoslava Stepanova (UWW)	6
Lorena Duraj (KOS)	0
Nikoleta Barmpa (GRE)	10
Alexandra Moisei (MDA)	4^{F}
Michaela Šeböková (SVK)	0
Laura Köhler (GER)	9^{F}
Wilma Hoffman (SWE)	0

Quarterfinals
Zlatoslava Stepanova (UWW)	2^{F}
Nikoleta Barmpa (GRE)	1
Alexandra Moisei (MDA)	1
Laura Köhler (GER)	13

Semifinals
Zlatoslava Stepanova (UWW)	4
Laura Köhler (GER)	2

Bottom half

Round of 32

Round of 16
Dominika Pochowska (POL)	2
Krystsina Kurkina (UWW)	2
Maja Munk (HUN)	2^{F}
Ilinka Stefanova (BUL)	4
Juliana Catanzaro (ITA)	0
Ayşe Erkan (TUR)	10
Maria Panțîru (ROU)	0
Oleksandra Rybak (UKR)	10^{F}

Quarterfinals
Krystsina Kurkina (UWW)	0
Maja Munk (HUN)	2^{F}
Ayşe Erkan (TUR)	3
Oleksandra Rybak (UKR)	7

Semifinals
Maja Munk (HUN)	0
Oleksandra Rybak (UKR)	10

Repechage round 2
Melina Samsonsen (NOR)	1
Nikoleta Barmpa (GRE)	6
Maria Panțîru (ROU)	5
Ayşe Erkan (TUR)	10

Bronze medals
Nikoleta Barmpa (GRE)	1
Laura Köhler (GER)	4
Ayşe Erkan (TUR)	11
Maja Munk (HUN)	0

=== 72 kg ===
3 and 4 July

Legend

- F — Won by fall

Main bracket

Round of 16
Anna Iodice (ITA)	0
Emili Apostolova (BUL)	4^{F}
Elvira Ersson (SWE)	5
Veronika Vilk (CRO)	0
Eylem Engin (TUR)	2
Daria Konstantynova (UKR)	10
Alina Shauchuk (UWW)	10
Kristina Bratchikova (UWW)	0

Quarterfinals
Karolina Jaworska (POL)	11
Emili Apostolova (BUL)	0
Elvira Ersson (SWE)	8
Zahra Karimzada (AZE)	2
Ana Mărioara (ROU)	0
Daria Konstantynova (UKR)	10
Alina Shauchuk (UWW)	9
Petra Müller (HUN)	1

Semifinals
Karolina Jaworska (POL)	4
Elvira Ersson (SWE)	8
Daria Konstantynova (UKR)	0
Alina Shauchuk (UWW)	7

Final
Elvira Ersson (SWE)	0
Alina Shauchuk (UWW)	4

Repechage round
Veronika Vilk (CRO)	8
Zahra Karimzada (AZE)	2
Kristina Bratchikova (UWW)	7^{F}
Petra Müller (HUN)	0

Bronze medals
Veronika Vilk (CRO)	2
Karolina Jaworska (POL)	5
Kristina Bratchikova (UWW)	8
Daria Konstantynova (UKR)	2

=== 76 kg ===
2 and 3 July

Legend

- F — Won by fall

Elimination groups

Group A

Pos	Athlete	Pld	W	L	CP	TP	UKR	UWW	UWW	LTU
1	Nadiia Sokolovska (UKR)	3	3	0	13	25	—	6–1	12–3 Fall	7–0 Fall
2	Diana Titova (UWW)	3	2	1	11	11	1–3 PO1	—	6–0 Fall	4–0 Fall
3	Hanna Pirskaya (UWW)	3	1	2	4	13	0–5 FA	0–5 FA	—	10–0
4	Augustė Gendvilaitė (LTU)	3	0	3	0	0	0–5 FA	0–5 FA	0–4 SU	—

Source: UWW

Group B

Pos	Athlete	Pld	W	L	CP	TP	HUN	TUR	SRB
1	Veronika Nyikos (HUN)	2	2	0	7	14	—	4–2	10–0
2	Elmira Yasin (TUR)	2	1	1	5	17	1–3 PO1	—	15–4
3	Evelin Ujhelji (SRB)	2	0	2	1	4	0–4 SU	1–4 SU1	—

Source: UWW

Knockout round

Semifinals
Nadiia Sokolovska (UKR)	7
Elmira Yasin (TUR)	2
Veronika Nyikos (HUN)	0
Diana Titova (UWW)	2^{F}

Finals
Nadiia Sokolovska (UKR)	6^{F}
Diana Titova (UWW)	0
Bronze medal match
Elmira Yasin (TUR)	2
Veronika Nyikos (HUN)	1

== See also ==
- 2025 European U20 Wrestling Championships – Men's freestyle
- 2025 European U20 Wrestling Championships – Men's Greco-Roman
