= 2024 U23 World Wrestling Championships – Women's freestyle 76 kg =

Wrestling competitions

Women's freestyle 76 kg at the 2024 U23 World Championships
- Venue: Tirana Olympic Park
- Dates: 23–24 October
- Competitors: 13 from 12 nations

Medalists
gold medal	Yelena Makoyed	United States
silver medal	Cheng Shuiyan	China
bronze medal	Nodoka Yamamoto	Japan
bronze medal	Valeriia Trifonova	Authorised Neutral Athletes

The women's freestyle 76 is a competition featured at the 2024 U23 World Wrestling Championships, and was held in Tirana, Albania on 23 and 24 October 2024.

This freestyle wrestling competition consists of a single-elimination tournament, with a repechage used to determine the winner of two bronze medals. The two finalists face off for gold and silver medals. Each wrestler who loses to one of the two finalists moves into the repechage, culminating in a pair of bronze medal matches featuring the semifinal losers each facing the remaining repechage opponent from their half of the bracket.

== Results ==
Legend

- F — Won by fall

=== Main bracket ===
Round of 16
Priya Malik (IND)	10
Marta Pajula (EST)	0
Yelena Makoyed (USA)	11
Alina Yertostik (KAZ)	0
Elmira Yasin (TUR)	0
Mariia Orlevych (UKR)	10
Cheng Shuiyan (CHN)	2
Sandra Guerrero (PUR)	1
Brianna Fraser (CAN)	7
Laura Kühn (GER)	3

Quarterfinals
Nodoka Yamamoto (JPN)	7
Priya Malik (IND)	4
Yelena Makoyed (USA)	9^{F}
Mariia Orlevych (UKR)	0
Valeriia Trifonova (AIN)	1
Cheng Shuiyan (CHN)	6
Brianna Fraser (CAN)	5
Zsófia Virág (HUN)	5

Semifinals
Nodoka Yamamoto (JPN)	2
Yelena Makoyed (USA)	13^{F}
Cheng Shuiyan (CHN)	10
Zsófia Virág (HUN)	0

Final
Yelena Makoyed (USA)	8^{F}
Cheng Shuiyan (CHN)	0

=== Repechage ===
Repechage round 1
Alina Yertostik (KAZ)	4^{F}
Mariia Orlevych (UKR)	4
Sandra Guerrero (PUR)	3
Valeriia Trifonova (AIN)	6

Bronze medals
Alina Yertostik (KAZ)	0
Nodoka Yamamoto (JPN)	11
Valeriia Trifonova (AIN)	2^{F}
Zsófia Virág (HUN)	0

== Final standing ==
Rank	Athlete
1st place, gold medalist(s)	Yelena Makoyed (USA)
2nd place, silver medalist(s)	Cheng Shuiyan (CHN)
3rd place, bronze medalist(s)	Nodoka Yamamoto (JPN)
3rd place, bronze medalist(s)	Valeriia Trifonova (AIN)
5	Alina Yertostik (KAZ)
5	Zsófia Virág (HUN)
7	Priya Malik (IND)
8	Mariia Orlevych (UKR)
9	Brianna Fraser (CAN)
10	Sandra Guerrero (PUR)
11	Laura Kühn (GER)
12	Marta Pajula (EST)
13	Elmira Yasin (TUR)
