= 2025 European U20 Wrestling Championships – Men's freestyle =

The Men's freestyle competitions at the 2025 European U20 Wrestling Championships were held in Caorle, Italy between 4 and 6 July 2025.

== Men's freestyle ==
=== 57 kg ===
4 and 5 July

Legend

- F — Won by fall

Main bracket

Round of 16
Ion Bulgaru (MDA)	12
Sasha Petrosyan (ARM)	6
Vasif Baghirov (AZE)	9^{F}
Nurettin Kapal (TUR)	0
Károly Baráth (HUN)	10
Antoni Gregorczyk (POL)	0
Mehmet Usinov (MKD)	11
Nico Altmeyer (GER)	22
Kristian Cikel (AUT)	1
Magomed-Saliakh Ozdamirov (UWW)	12
Nika Zangaladze (GEO)	10
Esad Bozali (BUL)	0
Riccardo Bonanno (ITA)	2
Matsvei Sytsevich (UWW)	12

Quarterfinals
Orest Petraniuk (UKR)	12
Ion Bulgaru (MDA)	14
Vasif Baghirov (AZE)	10
Károly Baráth (HUN)	0
Nico Altmeyer (GER)	0
Magomed-Saliakh Ozdamirov (UWW)	11
Nika Zangaladze (GEO)	10
Matsvei Sytsevich (UWW)	0

Semifinals
Ion Bulgaru (MDA)	1
Vasif Baghirov (AZE)	8
Magomed-Saliakh Ozdamirov (UWW)	0
Nika Zangaladze (GEO)	10

Final
Vasif Baghirov (AZE)	9
Nika Zangaladze (GEO)	6

Repechage round
Nurettin Kapal (TUR)	1
Károly Baráth (HUN)	10
Esad Bozali (BUL)	7
Matsvei Sytsevich (UWW)	5

Bronze medals
Károly Baráth (HUN)	2
Ion Bulgaru (MDA)	7
Esad Bozali (BUL)	0
Magomed-Saliakh Ozdamirov (UWW)	10

=== 61 kg ===
5 and 6 July

Legend

- F — Won by fall

Final

Final
Adlan Saitiev (UWW)	5
Sargis Begoyan (ARM)	6

Top half

Round of 32
Marcell Tóvölgyi-Krump (HUN)	0
Herbert Akapian (UWW)	10

Round of 16
Adlan Saitiev (UWW)	10
Ersjan Kashiku (ALB)	0
Herbert Akapian (UWW)	0
Saba Gambashidze (GEO)	6
Bashir Verdiyev (AZE)	5
Yusuf Kulalı (TUR)	2
Danoush Jowkar (GBR)	10
Rene Talts (EST)	0

Quarterfinals
Adlan Saitiev (UWW)	12
Saba Gambashidze (GEO)	2
Bashir Verdiyev (AZE)	14
Danoush Jowkar (GBR)	4

Semifinals
Adlan Saitiev (UWW)	15
Bashir Verdiyev (AZE)	5

Bottom half

Round of 32
Róbert Meszároš (SVK)	2
Vasili Lazarev (MDA)	12

Round of 16
Pasquale Liuzzi (ITA)	12
Murad Ilyaz (BUL)	2
Ivan Oksiuk (POL)	6
Sandro Hungerbühler (SUI)	7
Eliah Lucyga (GER)	10
Vasili Lazarev (MDA)	9
Andrii Shokaliuk (UKR)	2
Sargis Begoyan (ARM)	4

Quarterfinals
Pasquale Liuzzi (ITA)	2
Sandro Hungerbühler (SUI)	8
Eliah Lucyga (GER)	0
Sargis Begoyan (ARM)	11

Semifinals
Sandro Hungerbühler (SUI)	0
Sargis Begoyan (ARM)	7

Repechage round 2
Ersjan Kashiku (ALB)	0
Saba Gambashidze (GEO)	10
Andrii Shokaliuk (UKR)	10
Eliah Lucyga (GER)	0

Bronze medals
Saba Gambashidze (GEO)	9
Bashir Verdiyev (AZE)	9
Andrii Shokaliuk (UKR)	4
Sandro Hungerbühler (SUI)	0

=== 65 kg ===
4 and 5 July

Legend

- F — Won by fall

Final

Final
Viktor Borohan (UKR)	0
Amal Dzhandubaev (UWW)	10

Top half

Round of 32
Lukáš Brandl (CZE)	0
Maxim Dimov (MDA)	11

Round of 16
Viktor Borohan (UKR)	11
Janar Lips (EST)	0
Maxim Dimov (MDA)	3
Jakub Kęsy (POL)	2
Alessandro Nini (ITA)	3
Haji Karimov (AZE)	4
Lazare Gujaraidze (GEO)	10
Jorge Rodríguez (ESP)	0

Quarterfinals
Viktor Borohan (UKR)	6
Maxim Dimov (MDA)	3
Haji Karimov (AZE)	3
Lazare Gujaraidze (GEO)	4^{F}

Semifinals
Viktor Borohan (UKR)	11
Lazare Gujaraidze (GEO)	1

Bottom half

Round of 32
Benjamin Boejthe (ROU)	6
Erdal Galip (BUL)	4

Round of 16
Mózes László (HUN)	0
Jannis Rebholz (GER)	8^{F}
Arman Musikyan (ARM)	0
Amal Dzhandubaev (UWW)	5
Šamilj Dadajev (SRB)	0
Benjamin Boejthe (ROU)	10
Magomedkhan Magamedkhanov (UWW)	0
Abdullah Toprak (TUR)	10

Quarterfinals
Jannis Rebholz (GER)	2
Amal Dzhandubaev (UWW)	9
Benjamin Boejthe (ROU)	1
Abdullah Toprak (TUR)	12

Semifinals
Amal Dzhandubaev (UWW)	16
Abdullah Toprak (TUR)	5

Repechage round 2
Janar Lips (EST)	4
Maxim Dimov (MDA)	10
Arman Musikyan (ARM)	4
Jannis Rebholz (GER)	0

Bronze medals
Maxim Dimov (MDA)	14
Lazare Gujaraidze (GEO)	3
Arman Musikyan (ARM)	0
Abdullah Toprak (TUR)	10

=== 70 kg ===
4 and 5 July

Legend

- F — Won by fall

Final

Final
Inal Cheldiev (UWW)	14
Daniele Gubbiotti (ITA)	4

Top half

Round of 32
Inal Cheldiev (UWW)	10
Oleg Kniševskij (LTU)	0
Mykyta Sariiev (UKR)	0
Abdoullah Nakaev (FRA)	11
Justin Federer (GER)	0
Alexandr Gaidarli (MDA)	10

Round of 16
Aliaksandr Kambayeu (UWW)	3
Eduard Lenard (ROU)	11
Inal Cheldiev (UWW)	12
Goga Otinashvili (GEO)	6
Vladimir Azaryan (ARM)	6
Abdoullah Nakaev (FRA)	7
Alexandr Gaidarli (MDA)	11
Trim Ismaili (MKD)	0

Quarterfinals
Eduard Lenard (ROU)	0
Inal Cheldiev (UWW)	10
Abdoullah Nakaev (FRA)	11
Alexandr Gaidarli (MDA)	16

Semifinals
Inal Cheldiev (UWW)	8
Alexandr Gaidarli (MDA)	5

Bottom half

Round of 32
Ismayil Rahimli (AZE)	10
Patrik Tóth (HUN)	0
Tomás Gormley (IRL)	0
Daniele Gubbiotti (ITA)	10

Round of 16
Rasmus Ronin-Jõgi (EST)	0
Dominik Jagusz (POL)	10
Ismayil Rahimli (AZE)	0
Remzi Temur (TUR)	4
Kaloyan Atanasov (BUL)	7
Daniele Gubbiotti (ITA)	8
Denis Kodakov (ESP)	9
Samuel Sedlák (SVK)	0

Quarterfinals
Dominik Jagusz (POL)	12
Remzi Temur (TUR)	14
Daniele Gubbiotti (ITA)	6
Denis Kodakov (ESP)	0

Semifinals
Remzi Temur (TUR)	2
Daniele Gubbiotti (ITA)	5

Repechage round 1
Oleg Kniševskij (LTU)	0
Goga Otinashvili (GEO)	10
Tomás Gormley (IRL)	0
Kaloyan Atanasov (BUL)	10

Repechage round 2
Goga Otinashvili (GEO)	10
Eduard Lenard (ROU)	0
Kaloyan Atanasov (BUL)}	2
Denis Kodakov (ESP)	1

Bronze medal match
Goga Otinashvili (GEO)	11
Alexandr Gaidarli (MDA)	0
Kaloyan Atanasov (BUL)	4
Remzi Temur (TUR)	2

=== 74 kg ===
5 and 6 July

Legend

- F — Won by fall

Final

Final
Manuel Wagin (GER)	6
Raul Caso (ITA)	1

Top half

Round of 32
Alain Heller (SUI)	1
Declan Bligh (IRL)	14
Saba Kobakhidze (GEO)	8
Arayik Ayvazyan (ARM)	1

Round of 16
Nikolai Tarassov (EST)	0
Manuel Wagin (GER)	10
Declan Bligh (IRL)	3
Gabriel Ojog (MDA)	14
Mars Domajev (NOR)	0
Saba Kobakhidze (GEO)	10
Stiliyan Dzhorov (BUL)	0
Ismail Khaniev (UWW)	10

Quarterfinals
Manuel Wagin (GER)	10
Gabriel Ojog (MDA)	0
Saba Kobakhidze (GEO)	2
Ismail Khaniev (UWW)	12

Semifinals
Manuel Wagin (GER)	5
Ismail Khaniev (UWW)	4

Bottom half

Round of 32
Muslim Makhmudau (UWW)	14
Titas Pijoraitis (LTU)	1
Theocharis Kougioumtsidis (GRE)	11
Ádám Gazdag (HUN)	0

Round of 16
Antoni Majchrzak (POL)	3
Omar Gulmammadov (AZE)	13
Muslim Makhmudau (UWW)	10
Abdoul-Malek Nakaev (FRA)	5
Arslan Öztürk (TUR)	2
Theocharis Kougioumtsidis (GRE)	3
Raul Caso (ITA)	7
Bohdan Oliinyk (UKR)	4

Quarterfinals
Omar Gulmammadov (AZE)	11
Muslim Makhmudau (UWW)	0
Theocharis Kougioumtsidis (GRE)	9
Raul Caso (ITA)	1

Semifinals
Omar Gulmammadov (AZE)	1
Raul Caso (ITA)	5

Repechage round 2
Nikolai Tarassov (EST)	2
Gabriel Ojog (MDA)	9
Bohdan Oliinyk (UKR)	13
Theocharis Kougioumtsidis (GRE)	3

Bronze medals
Gabriel Ojog (MDA)	0
Ismail Khaniev (UWW)	10
Bohdan Oliinyk (UKR)	7
Omar Gulmammadov (AZE)	7

=== 79 kg ===
4 and 5 July

Legend

- F — Won by fall

Final

Final
Davit Tchetchelashvili (GEO)	10
Muradkhan Omarov (AZE)	0

Top half

Qualification
Davit Tchetchelashvili (GEO)	5
Daniel Simonian (ISR)	0

Round of 16
Bohdan Oleksiienko (UKR)	10
David Soare (ROU)	0
Davit Tchetchelashvili (GEO)	8
Tristan Aleksandrov (EST)	3
Vlad Stratan (MDA)	3
Said Saidulov (UWW)	14
Marat Kardanov (GER)	10
Avraam Moustopoulos (GRE)	0

Quarterfinals
Bohdan Oleksiienko (UKR)	1
Davit Tchetchelashvili (GEO)	12
Said Saidulov (UWW)	10
Marat Kardanov (GER)	0

Semifinals
Davit Tchetchelashvili (GEO)	10
Said Saidulov (UWW)	4

Bottom half

Qualification
Aliaksandr Viarbitsk (UWW)	10
Clay Amadio (ITA)	0

Round of 16
Filip Klatecki (POL)	6
Mukhammad Inshapiev (AUT)	16
Márk Laposa (HUN)	13
Bozhidar Dobrev (BUL)	0
Narek Nikoghosyan (ARM)	11
Aliaksandr Viarbitsk (UWW)	0
Hüseyin Kabaktaş (TUR)	2
Muradkhan Omarov (AZE)	5

Quarterfinals
Mukhammad Inshapiev (AUT)	6^{F}
Márk Laposa (HUN)	0
Narek Nikoghosyan (ARM)	3
Muradkhan Omarov (AZE)	7

Semifinals
Mukhammad Inshapiev (AUT)	0
Muradkhan Omarov (AZE)	11

Repechage round 1
Daniel Simonian (ISR)	10
Tristan Aleksandrov (EST)	6

Repechage round 2
Daniel Simonian (ISR)	0
Bohdan Oleksiienko (UKR)	10
Hüseyin Kabaktaş (TUR)	3
Narek Nikoghosyan (ARM)	1

Bronze medals
Bohdan Oleksiienko (UKR)	2
Said Saidulov (UWW)	12
Hüseyin Kabaktaş (TUR)	2
Mukhammad Inshapiev (AUT)	12

=== 86 kg ===
5 and 6 July

Legend

- F — Won by fall

Final

Final
Dachi Papinashvili (GEO)	3
Ahmet Yağan (TUR)	1

Top half

Round of 32
Mohammad Umkhadjiev (FRA)	7
Ali Shamirov (UWW)	18
Ondřej Kocmánek (CZE)	0
Bartłomiej Nowakowski (POL)	10
Vladislav Rjabtsev (EST)	2
Aliaksei Kulakou (UWW)	13

Round of 16
Dachi Papinashvili (GEO)	14
Anton Vyhivskyi (SVK)	6
Ali Shamirov (UWW)	4^{F}
Pavlo Vaskovskyi (UKR)	4
Tomer Drozhniak (ISR)	0
Bartłomiej Nowakowski (POL)	10
Aliaksei Kulakou (UWW)	11
Adam Leifridt (GER)	0

Quarterfinals
Dachi Papinashvili (GEO)	13
Ali Shamirov (UWW)	4
Bartłomiej Nowakowski (POL)	9
Aliaksei Kulakou (UWW)	5

Semifinals
Dachi Papinashvili (GEO)	11
Bartłomiej Nowakowski (POL)	0

Bottom half

Round of 32
Ahmet Yağan (TUR)	11
Darius Sas (ROU)	0
Grigor Chernakov (BUL)	1
Nick Scherrer (SUI)	8

Round of 16
Panagiotis Polychronidis (GRE)	0
Razmik Yepremyan (ARM)	11
Ahmet Yağan (TUR)	10
Lorenzo Marchesini (ITA)	0
Mahammad Abaszada (AZE)	10
Nick Scherrer (SUI)	0
Zétény Gangl (HUN)	1
Alexandru Borș (MDA)	9

Quarterfinals
Razmik Yepremyan (ARM)	1
Ahmet Yağan (TUR)	3
Mahammad Abaszada (AZE)	5
Alexandru Borș (MDA)	2

Semifinals
Ahmet Yağan (TUR)}	5
Mahammad Abaszada (AZE)	0

Repechage round 1
Darius Sas (ROU)	10
Lorenzo Marchesini (ITA)	0

Repechage round 2
Anton Vyhivskyi (SVK)	3^{F}
Ali Shamirov (UWW)	4
Darius Sas (ROU)	0
Razmik Yepremyan (ARM)	10

Bronze medals
Anton Vyhivskyi (SVK)	3
Bartłomiej Nowakowski (POL)	1
Razmik Yepremyan (ARM)	3
Mahammad Abaszada (AZE)	0

=== 92 kg ===
5 and 6 July

Legend

- F — Won by fall

Final

Final
Artur Togoev (UWW)	6
Musza Arsunkaev (HUN)	3

Top half

Round of 32
Aliaksei Zhorau (UWW)	10
Nikola Petrov (BUL)	0

Round of 16
Artur Togoev (UWW)	11
Sandro Kurashvili (GEO)	0
Aliaksei Zhorau (UWW)	10
Gheorghe Mutu (MDA)	0
Anar Jafarli (AZE)	13
Fabio Giannetto (SVK)	0
Yehor Horokh (UKR)	11
Rakhman Khounkaev (FRA)	1

Quarterfinals
Artur Togoev (UWW)	10
Aliaksei Zhorau (UWW)	0
Anar Jafarli (AZE)	9
Yehor Horokh (UKR)	6

Semifinals
Artur Togoev (UWW)	10
Anar Jafarli (AZE)	0

Bottom half

Round of 32

Round of 16
Alexandru Oltean (ROU)	0
Narek Ikilikyan (ARM)	10
Grigoris Saridis (GRE)	12
Brando Magnani (ITA)	2
Musza Arsunkaev (HUN)	10
Eyüp Önen (TUR)	0
Albin Peposhi (ALB)	0
Omer Memedi (MKD)	10

Quarterfinals
Narek Ikilikyan (ARM)	3
Grigoris Saridis (GRE)	4
Musza Arsunkaev (HUN)	10^{F}
Omer Memedi (MKD)	0

Semifinals
Grigoris Saridis (GRE)	0
Musza Arsunkaev (HUN)	11

Repechage round 2
Sandro Kurashvili (GEO)	8
Aliaksei Zhorau (UWW)	0
Eyüp Önen (TUR)	0
Omer Memedi (MKD)	10

Bronze medals
Sandro Kurashvili (GEO)	4
Anar Jafarli (AZE)	7
Omer Memedi (MKD)	5
Grigoris Saridis (GRE)	6

=== 97 kg ===
4 and 5 July

Legend

- F — Won by fall

Final

Final
Ashab Dadaev (FRA)	0
Konstantine Petriashvili (GEO)	10

Top half

Round of 32
Nikolaos Karavanos (GRE)	14
Armanis Barsamyan (LTU)	3

Round of 16
David Metea (ROU)	2
Kostiantyn Zadoianchuk (UKR)	3
Nikolaos Karavanos (GRE)	11
Ilija Atanasov (MKD)	0
Ashab Dadaev (FRA)	10
Giuliano Spaccavento (ITA)	0
Mateusz Pudłowski (POL)	0
Andriyan Valkanov (BUL)	12

Quarterfinals
Kostiantyn Zadoianchuk (UKR)	1
Nikolaos Karavanos (GRE)	6
Ashab Dadaev (FRA)	15
Andriyan Valkanov (BUL)	4

Semifinals
Nikolaos Karavanos (GRE)	2
Ashab Dadaev (FRA)	3

Bottom half

Round of 32

Round of 16
Samuel Beck (SVK)	0
Hrachik Mkrtchyan (ARM)	10
Magomedgadzhi Magomedov (UWW)	10
David Erhan (MDA)	0
Konstantine Petriashvili (GEO)	10
Péter Zsivnovszki (HUN)	0
Ravan Musayev (AZE)	6
İbrahim Benekli (TUR)	1

Quarterfinals
Hrachik Mkrtchyan (ARM)	0
Magomedgadzhi Magomedov (UWW)	10
Konstantine Petriashvili (GEO)	12
Ravan Musayev (AZE)	4

Semifinals
Magomedgadzhi Magomedov (UWW)	3
Konstantine Petriashvili (GEO)	3

Repechage round 2
Giuliano Spaccavento (ITA)	0
Andriyan Valkanov (BUL)	11
Péter Zsivnovszki (HUN)	0
Ravan Musayev (AZE)	7

Bronze medals
Andriyan Valkanov (BUL)	7
Nikolaos Karavanos (GRE)	1
Ravan Musayev (AZE)	0
Magomedgadzhi Magomedov (UWW)	6

=== 125 kg ===
5 and 6 July

Legend

- F — Won by fall

Main bracket

Round of 16
Henrik Haykyan (ARM)	0
Sertaç Aksoy (TUR)	3
Yaraslau Kokhan (UWW)	0
Inal Gagloev (UWW)	10
Ahmet Yigit Sekmen (GER)	0
Ivan Myroshnychenko (UKR)	10
Michał Dubowski (POL)	12
Martino Piliero (ITA)	2
Yusif Dursunov (AZE)	12
Dian Manev (BUL)	1
Levan Lagvilava (FRA)	3
Dániel Szilágyi (HUN)	2

Quarterfinals
Aleksandre Abramishvili (GEO)	2
Sertaç Aksoy (TUR)	1
Inal Gagloev (UWW)	11
Ivan Myroshnychenko (UKR)	0
Michał Dubowski (POL)	0
Yusif Dursunov (AZE)	11
Levan Lagvilava (FRA)	11^{F}
Vladimir Anghel (MDA)	0

Semifinals
Aleksandre Abramishvili (GEO)	0
Inal Gagloev (UWW)	10
Yusif Dursunov (AZE)	13
Levan Lagvilava (FRA)	2

Final
Inal Gagloev (UWW)	11
Yusif Dursunov (AZE)	0

Repechage round
Yaraslau Kokhan (UWW)	4
Ivan Myroshnychenko (UKR)	7
Dian Manev (BUL)	10
Michał Dubowski (POL)	0

Bronze medals
Ivan Myroshnychenko (UKR)	2
Aleksandre Abramishvili (GEO)	8
Dian Manev (BUL)	0
Levan Lagvilava (FRA)	4^{F}

== See also ==
- 2025 European U20 Wrestling Championships – Men's Greco-Roman
- 2025 European U20 Wrestling Championships – Women's freestyle
