= 2025 European U20 Wrestling Championships – Men's Greco-Roman =

The Men's Greco-Roman competitions at the 2025 European U20 Wrestling Championships were held in Caorle, Italy between 30 June and 2 July 2025.

== Men's Greco-Roman ==
=== 55 kg ===
30 June and 1 July

Legend

- F — Won by fall

Main bracket

Round of 16
Denizhan Ogün (TUR)	2
Nazarii Babinskyi (UKR)	4
Koba Karumidze (GEO)	4
Turan Dashdamirov (AZE)	4
Nolan Pissocher (FRA)	1
Levon Ghazaryan (ARM)	2
Péter Tótok (HUN)	1
Maxim Sarmanov (MDA)	3
Ivan Solomin (UWW)	8
Jakub Sedlák (CZE)	0
Lorenzo Arbore (ITA)	0
Rasim Ibrahimau (UWW)	9
Dragoș Draga (ROU)	6
Gracjan Jedut (POL)	1

Quarterfinals
Kaloyan Ivanov (BUL)	1
Nazarii Babinskyi (UKR)	2
Turan Dashdamirov (AZE)	1
Levon Ghazaryan (ARM)	1
Maxim Sarmanov (MDA)	0
Ivan Solomin (UWW)	9
Rasim Ibrahimau (UWW)	0
Dragoș Draga (ROU)	8

Semifinals
Nazarii Babinskyi (UKR)	1
Turan Dashdamirov (AZE)	3
Ivan Solomin (UWW)	8
Dragoș Draga (ROU)	0

Final
Turan Dashdamirov (AZE)	1
Ivan Solomin (UWW)	1

Repechage round
Koba Karumidze (GEO)	3
Levon Ghazaryan (ARM)	1
Jakub Sedlák (CZE)	3
Maxim Sarmanov (MDA)	7

Bronze medals
Koba Karumidze (GEO)	4
Nazarii Babinskyi (UKR)	0
Maxim Sarmanov (MDA)	5^{F}
Dragoș Draga (ROU)	0

=== 60 kg ===
1 and 2 July

Legend

- F — Won by fall
- R — Retired

Final

Final
Aykhan Javadov (AZE)	1
Adam Silverin (SWE)	1

Top half

Round of 32
Levente Fige (HUN)	3
Yuri Karapetyan (ARM)	2
Levin Meier (SUI)	0
Aykhan Javadov (AZE)	8

Round of 16
Ionuț Mereuță (ROU)	9
Mikel Troplini (ALB)	0
Levente Fige (HUN)	1
Vakhtang Lolua (GEO)	4
Lucas Lo Grasso (FRA)	1
Aykhan Javadov (AZE)	9
Maxim Carauş (MDA)	0
Ömer Altaş (TUR)	10

Quarterfinals
Ionuț Mereuță (ROU)	1
Vakhtang Lolua (GEO)	6
Aykhan Javadov (AZE)	6
Ömer Altaş (TUR)	1

Semifinals
Vakhtang Lolua (GEO)	1
Aykhan Javadov (AZE)	4

Bottom half

Round of 32
Artturi-Eemeli Reinio (EST)	3
Uladzimir Kastaronak (UWW)	9
Kacper Sobczyk (POL)	0
Martin Aak (NOR)	8

Round of 16
Murat Khatit (UWW)	2
Gabriele Pucher (ITA)	1
Uladzimir Kastaronak (UWW)	1
Maksut Sultanov (UKR)	6
Galin Furnadzhiev (BUL)	9
Martin Aak (NOR)	0
Adam Silverin (SWE)	9
Noa Ljubić (CRO)	0

Quarterfinals
Murat Khatit (UWW)	0
Maksut Sultanov (UKR)	9
Galin Furnadzhiev (BUL)	0
Adam Silverin (SWE)	9

Semifinals
Maksut Sultanov (UKR)	1
Adam Silverin (SWE)	3

Repechage round 1
Levin Meier (SUI)	4
Lucas Lo Grasso (FRA)	12

Repechage round 2
Lucas Lo Grasso (FRA)	2
Ömer Altaş (TUR)	10
Noa Ljubić (CRO)	11
Galin Furnadzhiev (BUL)	4

Bronze medals
Ömer Altaş (TUR)	3^{R}
Vakhtang Lolua (GEO)	10
Noa Ljubić (CRO)	0
Maksut Sultanov (UKR)	8

=== 63 kg ===
30 June and 1 July

Legend

- C — Won by 3 cautions given to the opponent
- F — Won by fall

Final

Final
Igor Punchenko (UWW)	9
Tural Ahmadov (AZE)	1

Top half

Round of 32
Maksym Chuhuiev (UKR)	4
Lukas Benzing (GER)	0
Igor Punchenko (UWW)	9
Hacı Ahmet Altan (TUR)	0
Daniel Struzinjski (AUT)	4
Dumitru Rapeșco (MDA)	2

Round of 16
Aleks Margaryan (ARM)	7^{F}
Andrej Velisavljev (SRB)	0
Maksym Chuhuiev (UKR)	2
William Ekerot (SWE)	6
Al-Bara Chopalaev (EST)	0
Igor Punchenko (UWW)	8
Daniel Struzinjski (AUT)	0
Yauheni Shved (UWW)	8

Quarterfinals
Aleks Margaryan (ARM)	5
William Ekerot (SWE)	13
Igor Punchenko (UWW)	9
Yauheni Shved (UWW)	0

Semifinals
William Ekerot (SWE)	0
Igor Punchenko (UWW)	7

Bottom half

Round of 32
Tural Ahmadov (AZE)	8^{C}
Emanuele Pollino (ITA)	0
Iosif Zlotar (ROU)	5
Ilias Laaouina (NED)	5

Round of 16
Bende Olasz (HUN)	6
Saba Surmanidze (GEO)	2
Tural Ahmadov (AZE)	4
Kristiyan Milenkov (BUL)	0
Mateusz Alot (POL)	1
Iosif Zlotar (ROU)	1
Lauri Perkka (FIN)	1
Marios Kapantais (GRE)	3

Quarterfinals
Bende Olasz (HUN)	1
Tural Ahmadov (AZE)	3
Mateusz Alot (POL)	1
Marios Kapantais (GRE)	6

Semifinals
Tural Ahmadov (AZE)	11
Marios Kapantais (GRE)	1

Repechage round 1
Hacı Ahmet Altan (TUR)	4
Al-Bara Chopalaev (EST)	7
Emanuele Pollino (ITA)	0
Kristiyan Milenkov (BUL)	9

Repechage round 2
Al-Bara Chopalaev (EST)	0
Yauheni Shved (UWW)	11
Kristiyan Milenkov (BUL)	2
Bende Olasz (HUN)	8

Bronze medals
Yauheni Shved (UWW)	0
William Ekerot (SWE)	10
Bende Olasz (HUN)	9
Marios Kapantais (GRE)	0

=== 67 kg ===
1 and 2 July

Legend

- F — Won by fall

Final

Final
Vladyslav Pokotylo (UKR)	0
Mingiian Goriaev (UWW)	9

Top half

Round of 32
Kevin Karl (GER)	3
Vladyslav Pokotylo (UKR)	5
Stavros Ntounias (GRE)	3
Alessio Arancio (ITA)	13
Saya Brunner (SUI)	0
Anri Khozrevanidze (GEO)	8
Marko Klarić (CRO)	0
Isa Bektemirov (AUT)	6^{F}
Dejan Berkec (SRB)	6
Hayk Kalajyan (ARM)	5

Round of 16
Zdeněk Kubala (CZE)	0
Vladyslav Pokotylo (UKR)	10
Alessio Arancio (ITA)	0
Anri Khozrevanidze (GEO)	9
Bers Timirbiev (NOR)	8
Isa Bektemirov (AUT)	8
Dejan Berkec (SRB)	2
Ilian Doubach (FRA)	11

Quarterfinals
Vladyslav Pokotylo (UKR)	8
Anri Khozrevanidze (GEO)	3
Bers Timirbiev (NOR)	2
Ilian Doubach (FRA)	4

Semifinals
Vladyslav Pokotylo (UKR)	5
Ilian Doubach (FRA)	3

Bottom half

Round of 32
Eimantas Andriuška (LTU)	0
Abdullah Keskin (TUR)	9
Attila Józsa (HUN)	0
Mikhail Markouski (UWW)	2
Octavian Cerneţchi (MDA)	6
Jakub Suchecki (POL)	8
Pavel Alexe (ROU)	8
Magnus Rasmussen (DEN)	0

Round of 16
Mingiian Goriaev (UWW)	8
Abdullah Keskin (TUR)	0
Mikhail Markouski (UWW)	10
Hjalmar Sandin (SWE)	1
Dimitar Georgiev (BUL)	10
Jakub Suchecki (POL)	1
Pavel Alexe (ROU)	1
Faraim Mustafayev (AZE)	1

Quarterfinals
Mingiian Goriaev (UWW)	7
Mikhail Markouski (UWW)	5
Dimitar Georgiev (BUL)	1
Faraim Mustafayev (AZE)	11

Semifinals
Mingiian Goriaev (UWW)	14^{F}
Faraim Mustafayev (AZE)	5

Repechage round 1
Kevin Karl (GER)	9
Zdeněk Kubala (CZE)	1

Repechage round 2
Kevin Karl (GER)	0
Anri Khozrevanidze (GEO)	9
Abdullah Keskin (TUR)	5
Mikhail Markouski (UWW)	2

Bronze medal match
Anri Khozrevanidze (GEO)	8
Ilian Doubach (FRA)	0
Abdullah Keskin (TUR)	5
Faraim Mustafayev (AZE)	7

=== 72 kg ===
1 and 2 July

Legend

- F — Won by fall

Final

Final
Aleksandre Rusitashvili (GEO)	4
Gaspar Terteryan (ARM)	3

Top half

Round of 32
Jovan Miolski (SRB)	0
Aleksandre Rusitashvili (GEO)	9
Anatolii Pasnak (UKR)	7
Lars Letvik (NOR)	2
Hubert Sidoruk (POL)	4
Aleksandrs Tumarevičs (LAT)	3

Round of 16
Axel Baff (SWE)	1
Sergey Stoev (BUL)	1
Aleksandre Rusitashvili (GEO)	3
Yan Zianko (UWW)	0
Luis Greif (GER)	2
Anatolii Pasnak (UKR)	5
Hubert Sidoruk (POL)	8
Kipras Puikis (LTU)	5

Quarterfinals
Sergey Stoev (BUL)	1
Aleksandre Rusitashvili (GEO)	1
Anatolii Pasnak (UKR)	10
Hubert Sidoruk (POL)	3

Semifinals
Aleksandre Rusitashvili (GEO)	4
Anatolii Pasnak (UKR)	0

Bottom half

Round of 32
Oliver Pada (FIN)	8^{F}
Federico Caniglia (ITA)	0
Tamerlan Taranukha (UWW)	12
İbrahim Özdemir (TUR)	4
Arionas Kolitsopoulos (GRE)	8
Gonzalo Caparrós (ESP)	0
Jure Rajković (CRO)	9
Mitja Cener (SLO)	0

Round of 16
Seymur Gasimov (AZE)	12
Oliver Pada (FIN)	0
Tamerlan Taranukha (UWW)	8
Vladimir Pascari (MDA)	0
Gaspar Terteryan (ARM)	2
Arionas Kolitsopoulos (GRE)	1
Jure Rajković (CRO)	0
Bendegúz Felkai (HUN)	9

Quarterfinals
Seymur Gasimov (AZE)	11
Tamerlan Taranukha (UWW)	0
Gaspar Terteryan (ARM)	9
Bendegúz Felkai (HUN)	1

Semifinals
Seymur Gasimov (AZE)	1
Gaspar Terteryan (ARM)	5

Repechage round 1
Jovan Miolski (SRB)	0
Yan Zianko (UWW)	8

Repechage round 2
Yan Zianko (UWW)	0
Sergey Stoev (BUL)	3
Arionas Kolitsopoulos (GRE)	7
Bendegúz Felkai (HUN)	5

Bronze medals
Sergey Stoev (BUL)	3
Anatolii Pasnak (UKR)	3
Arionas Kolitsopoulos (GRE)	3
Seymur Gasimov (AZE)	1

=== 77 kg ===
30 June and 1 July

Legend

- F — Won by fall

Final

Final
Davud Mammadov (AZE)	1
Anri Putkaradze (GEO)	3

Top half

Qualification
Gamzat Gadzhiev (UWW)	9
Igor Dąbrowski (POL)	0

Round of 16
Petro Shafranskyi (UKR)	0
Samvel Terteryan (ARM)	4
Gamzat Gadzhiev (UWW)	9
Janno Iljas (EST)	0
Yusuf Tosun (TUR)	10
Matti Stolt (GER)	0
Constantin Taşcă (MDA)	0
Davud Mammadov (AZE)	11

Quarterfinals
Samvel Terteryan (ARM)	10
Gamzat Gadzhiev (UWW)	1
Yusuf Tosun (TUR)	3
Davud Mammadov (AZE)	3

Semifinals
Samvel Terteryan (ARM)	1
Davud Mammadov (AZE)	4

Bottom half

Qualification
Kiryl Valeuski (UWW)	1
Anri Putkaradze (GEO)	5^{F}

Round of 16
Nilo Virgilii (ITA)	2
Hristo Valentinov (BUL)	5
Vikke Tarkkio (FIN)	8
Mihajlo Alempijević (SRB)	0
Lars Matt (AUT)	0
Anri Putkaradze (GEO)	9
Dimitrios Romanidis (GRE)	1
Dominik Botos (HUN)	5

Quarterfinals
Hristo Valentinov (BUL)	2
Vikke Tarkkio (FIN)	8
Anri Putkaradze (GEO)	5
Dominik Botos (HUN)	1

Semifinals
Vikke Tarkkio (FIN)	1
Anri Putkaradze (GEO)	9

Repechage round 1
Kiryl Valeuski (UWW)	8
Lars Matt (AUT)	0

Repechage round 2
Constantin Taşcă (MDA)	10^{F}
Yusuf Tosun (TUR)	4
Kiryl Valeuski (UWW)	8
Dominik Botos (HUN)	1

Bronze medals
Constantin Taşcă (MDA)	0
Samvel Terteryan (ARM)	8
Kiryl Valeuski (UWW)	11
Vikke Tarkkio (FIN)	3

=== 82 kg ===
1 and 2 July

Legend

- F — Won by fall

Final

Final
Szabolcs Szinay (HUN)	2
Mikhail Shkarin (UWW)	7

Top half

Round of 32
Szabolcs Szinay (HUN)	7
Kyrylo Shnyrov (UKR)	0
Mihael Lukač (CRO)	9
Marius Stiharu (MDA)	0
Martin Shishekov (BUL)	0
Abdulmasih Abdulmasih (UWW)	9

Round of 16
Alexander Åmås (NOR)	10
Emmanouil Nikolaidis (GRE)	0
Szabolcs Szinay (HUN)	9
Petr Žák (CZE)	0
Oskar Lubera (POL)	2
Mihael Lukač (CRO)	4
Abdulmasih Abdulmasih (UWW)	2
Severi Mäenpää (FIN)	3

Quarterfinals
Alexander Åmås (NOR)	0
Szabolcs Szinay (HUN)	8
Mihael Lukač (CRO)	4
Severi Mäenpää (FIN)	9

Semifinals
Szabolcs Szinay (HUN)	9
Severi Mäenpää (FIN)	0

Bottom half

Round of 32
Dominic Arnold (GER)	8
Haik Sargsyan (FRA)	6
Mikhail Shkarin (UWW)	8
Luigi Comini (ITA)	0
Noah Walder (AUT)	0
Elmin Aliyev (AZE)	9

Round of 16
Bünyamin Özcan (TUR)	2
Dominic Arnold (GER)	3
Mikhail Shkarin (UWW)	7^{F}
Ognjen Jakovljević (SRB)	1
Tornike Chkhikvadze (GEO)	1
Elmin Aliyev (AZE)	7
Martik Petrosyan (ARM)	5^{F}
Uku Eskel (EST)	0

Quarterfinals
Dominic Arnold (GER)	0
Mikhail Shkarin (UWW)	9
Elmin Aliyev (AZE)	7
Martik Petrosyan (ARM)	4

Semifinals
Mikhail Shkarin (UWW)	4
Elmin Aliyev (AZE)	1

Repechage round 1
Kyrylo Shnyrov (UKR)	3
Petr Žák (CZE)	0
Luigi Comini (ITA)	0
Ognjen Jakovljević (SRB)	8

Repechage round 2
Kyrylo Shnyrov (UKR)	5
Alexander Åmås (NOR)	3
Ognjen Jakovljević (SRB)	9
Dominic Arnold (GER)	1

Bronze medals
Kyrylo Shnyrov (UKR)	4^{F}
Severi Mäenpää (FIN)	2
Ognjen Jakovljević (SRB)	0
Elmin Aliyev (AZE)	10

=== 87 kg ===
30 June and 1 July

Legend

- F — Won by fall

Final

Final
Luka Kochalidze (GEO)	8
Abdurakhman Abdulkadyrov (UWW)	0

Top half

Round of 32
Petyo Angelov (BUL)	4
Elia Caianiello (ITA)	7
Vilmos Scheuring (HUN)	0
Luka Kochalidze (GEO)	4
Eleftherios Pappas (GRE)	0
Wojciech Iwanowski (POL)	11

Round of 16
Marcus-Evert Uhtjärv (EST)	0
Paul Mayer (AUT)	9
Elia Caianiello (ITA)	0
Yasin Çakır (TUR)	6^{F}
Pavlo Torianyk (UKR)	0
Luka Kochalidze (GEO)	3
Wojciech Iwanowski (POL)	10
Elias Lyyski (FIN)	1

Quarterfinals
Paul Mayer (AUT)	4
Yasin Çakır (TUR)	1
Luka Kochalidze (GEO)	8
Wojciech Iwanowski (POL)	1

Semifinals
Paul Mayer (AUT)	0
Luka Kochalidze (GEO)	5

Bottom half

Round of 32
Antonio Lukač (CRO)	9
Toms Irklis (LAT)	0
Abdurakhman Abdulkadyrov (UWW)	8
Iurik Petrosian (ARM)	6
Gabriel Stan (ROU)	4
Orkhan Hajiyev (AZE)	1

Round of 16
Branko Đukić (SRB)	7
Antonio Lukač (CRO)	0
Abdurakhman Abdulkadyrov (UWW)	10
Cristian Rusu (MDA)	0
Josef Černý (GEO)	0
Gabriel Stan (ROU)	9
Martin Ljosåk (NOR)	9
Ivan Bialiayeu (UWW)	0

Quarterfinals
Branko Đukić (SRB)	1
Abdurakhman Abdulkadyrov (UWW)	5
Gabriel Stan (ROU)	1
Martin Ljosåk (NOR)	9

Semifinals
Abdurakhman Abdulkadyrov (UWW)	6
Martin Ljosåk (NOR)	0

Repechage round 1
Vilmos Scheuring (HUN)	4
Pavlo Torianyk (UKR)	5
Iurik Petrosian (ARM)	5
Cristian Rusu (MDA)	1

Repechage round 2
Pavlo Torianyk (UKR)	4
Wojciech Iwanowski (POL)	2
Iurik Petrosian (ARM)	2
Branko Đukić (SRB)	3

Bronze medals
Pavlo Torianyk (UKR)	5
Paul Mayer (AUT)	0
Branko Đukić (SRB)	6
Martin Ljosåk (NOR)	1

=== 97 kg ===
1 and 2 July

Legend

- F — Won by fall
- WO — Won by walkover

Main bracket

Round of 16
Özkan Mete (TUR)	0
Sebastian Warchoł (POL)	6^{F}
Jáchym Zajačik (CZE)	9
Riccardo Bufis (ITA)	1
Vendel Vitai (HUN)	3
Dimitrios Pappas (GRE)	2
Yehor Yakushenko (UKR)	9
Villas Christensen (DEN)	0
Pavel Savitski (UWW)	3^{F}
Gor Ayvazyan (GEO)	1
Ismayil Rzayev (AZE)	2
Saipula Gadzhimagomedov (UWW)	10
Lyova Shukhyan (ARM)	WO
~~Affan Smajić (BIH)~~

Quarterfinals
Darius Kiefer (GER)	11
Sebastian Warchoł (POL)	0
Jáchym Zajačik (CZE)	1
Vendel Vitai (HUN)	9
Yehor Yakushenko (UKR)	8
Pavel Savitski (UWW)	0
Saipula Gadzhimagomedov (UWW)	8
Lyova Shukhyan (ARM)	0

Semifinals
Darius Kiefer (GER)	9
Vendel Vitai (HUN)	0
Yehor Yakushenko (UKR)	10
Saipula Gadzhimagomedov (UWW)	2

Final
Darius Kiefer (GER)	5
Yehor Yakushenko (UKR)	3

Repechage round
Villas Christensen (DEN)	0
Pavel Savitski (UWW)	3

Bronze medals
Sebastian Warchoł (POL)	3
Vendel Vitai (HUN)	1
Pavel Savitski (UWW)	1
Saipula Gadzhimagomedov (UWW)	10

=== 130 kg ===
30 June and 1 July

Legend

- F — Won by fall

Main bracket

Round of 16
Leonhard Junger (AUT)	4
Mateusz Bieńczak (POL)	2
Roope Rusi (FIN)	0
Ivan Yankovskyi (UKR)	8
László Darabos (HUN)	7^{F}
Cemal Yusuf Bakır (TUR)	0
Saba Purtseladze (GEO)	8
Dionysios Zougris (GRE)	0
Loris Tucci (ITA)	0
Seyran Kirakosyan (ARM)	4^{F}
Marko Šupić (SRB)	1
Viachaslau Fedaryna (UWW)	7
Ali Iliasov (UWW)	8
Ole Sterning (GER)	0

Quarterfinals
Mazaim Mardanov (AZE)	1
Leonhard Junger (AUT)	1
Ivan Yankovskyi (UKR)	0
László Darabos (HUN)	4
Saba Purtseladze (GEO)	9
Seyran Kirakosyan (ARM)	0
Viachaslau Fedaryna (UWW)	2
Ali Iliasov (UWW)	9

Semifinals
Leonhard Junger (AUT)	0
László Darabos (HUN)	9
Saba Purtseladze (GEO)	1
Ali Iliasov (UWW)	9

Final
László Darabos (HUN)	1
Ali Iliasov (UWW)	1

Repechage round
Cemal Yusuf Bakır (TUR)	3
Ivan Yankovskyi (UKR)	12
Ole Sterning (GER)	5
Viachaslau Fedaryna (UWW)	4^{F}

Bronze medals
Ivan Yankovskyi (UKR)	8
Leonhard Junger (AUT)	0
Viachaslau Fedaryna (UWW)	3
Saba Purtseladze (GEO)	8

== See also ==
- 2025 European U20 Wrestling Championships – Men's freestyle
- 2025 European U20 Wrestling Championships – Women's freestyle
