= 2024 U20 World Wrestling Championships – Women's freestyle =

The women's freestyle competitions at the 2024 U20 World Wrestling Championships were held in Pontevedra, Spain between 4 and 6 September 2024.

== Women's freestyle ==
=== 50 kg ===
4 and 5 September

Legend

- F — Won by fall

Round of 16
Anaya Falcon (USA)	10
Shahreen Gulacha (CAN)	0
Laura Ganikyzy (KAZ)	8
Joanna Samsonowicz (POL)	1
Haruna Morikawa (JPN)	12
Svenja Jungo (SUI)	4
Fatma Kızmaz (TUR)	6
Aysel Mammadzada (AZE)	0
Yorlenis Morán (PAN)	4
Sviatlana Katenka (AIN)	2
Violetta Biriukova (AIN)	4
Aida Kerymova (UKR)	10
Zhang Yu (CHN)	10
Muskan (IND)	0
Nipuni Wasana (SRI)	2
María Cazalla (ESP)	4

Quarterfinals
Anaya Falcon (USA)	5
Laura Ganikyzy (KAZ)	6
Haruna Morikawa (JPN)	8^{F}
Fatma Kızmaz (TUR)	0
Yorlenis Morán (PAN)	3
Aida Kerymova (UKR)	5^{F}
Zhang Yu (CHN)	8^{F}
María Cazalla (ESP)	0

Semifinals
Laura Ganikyzy (KAZ)	0
Haruna Morikawa (JPN)	4^{F}
Aida Kerymova (UKR)	2
Zhang Yu (CHN)	13

Final
Haruna Morikawa (JPN)	6
Zhang Yu (CHN)	7

Repechage round
Svenja Jungo (SUI)	7^{F}
Fatma Kızmaz (TUR)	0
Muskan (IND)	12
María Cazalla (ESP)	2

Bronze medal match
Svenja Jungo (SUI)	7
Laura Ganikyzy (KAZ)	4
Muskan (IND)	2
Aida Kerymova (UKR)	6^{F}

=== 53 kg ===
5 and 6 September

Final
Zhang Jin (CHN)	4^{F}
Carla Jaume (ESP)	0

Round of 32
Yengilik Kabylbek (KAZ)	0
Nethmi Poruthotage (SRI)	10
Chen Ya-hsin (TPE)	5
Ilona Valchuk (POL)	6
~~Fatima Bouchibi (ALG)~~
Valeryia Mikitsich (AIN)	WO

Round of 16
Liliána Kapuvári (HUN)	4^{F}
Réka Hegedüs (SVK)	0
Nethmi Poruthotage (SRI)	10
Nikol Krumova (BUL)	0
Zhang Jin (CHN)	10
Ilona Valchuk (POL)	0
Valeryia Mikitsich (AIN)	8^{F}
Yusneiry Agrazal (PAN)	2

Quarterfinals
Liliána Kapuvári (HUN)	3
Nethmi Poruthotage (SRI)	14
Zhang Jin (CHN)	14
Valeryia Mikitsich (AIN)	4

Semifinals
Nethmi Poruthotage (SRI)	2
Zhang Jin (CHN)	2^{F}

Round of 32
Shammilka Miranda (PUR)	2
Olga Ovchinnikova (AIN)	13
Sofiia Marchenko (UKR)	7^{F}
Hava Konca (TUR)	0

Round of 16
Ana Rotaru (ROU)	4
Carla Jaume (ESP)	12
Olga Ovchinnikova (AIN)	1
Saki Yumiya (JPN)	5^{F}
Asmar Jankurtaran (AZE)	4^{F}
Sofiia Marchenko (UKR)	6
Brianna Gonzalez (USA)	1
Jyoti Sihag (IND)	3

Quarterfinals
Carla Jaume (ESP)	7
Saki Yumiya (JPN)	3
Asmar Jankurtaran (AZE)	4
Jyoti Sihag (IND)	15

Semifinals
Carla Jaume (ESP)	4
Jyoti Sihag (IND)	3

Repechage round 1
Ilona Valchuk (POL)	2
Valeryia Mikitsich (AIN)	3
Ana Rotaru (ROU)	0
Saki Yumiya (JPN)	10

Bronze medal match
Valeryia Mikitsich (AIN)	2
Nethmi Poruthotage (SRI)	6
Saki Yumiya (JPN)	6
Jyoti Sihag (IND)	4

=== 55 kg ===
4 and 5 September

Final

Final
Cristelle Rodriguez (USA)	4^{F}
Byambasürengiin Khaliun (MGL)	0

Top half

Round of 32
Ekaterina Chikanova (AIN)	7
Diana Kotvytska (UKR)	3

Round of 16
Cristelle Rodriguez (USA)	11
Amelia Tomala (POL)	0
Ekaterina Chikanova (AIN)	9
Alina Makhambetova (KAZ)	0
Aliaksandra Bulava (AIN)	10^{F}
Milica Sekulović (SRB)	0
Chen Yu-syun (TPE)	0
Tuba Demir (TUR)	10

Quarterfinals
Cristelle Rodriguez (USA)	13
Ekaterina Chikanova (AIN)	0
Aliaksandra Bulava (AIN)	0
Tuba Demir (TUR)	12

Semifinals
Cristelle Rodriguez (USA)	9^{F}
Tuba Demir (TUR)	2

Bottom half

Round of 32

Round of 16
Josefina Ramírez (MEX)	0
Karina Honda (JPN)	8^{F}
Pau Gimeno (ESP)	0
Dhanshri Fand (IND)	8^{F}
Madisyn Grof (CAN)	0
Byambasürengiin Khaliun (MGL)	11
Chen Liuxuan (CHN)	13
Nargiz Samadova (AZE)	18

Quarterfinals
Karina Honda (JPN)	4
Dhanshri Fand (IND)	0
Byambasürengiin Khaliun (MGL)	6
Nargiz Samadova (AZE)	2

Semifinals
Karina Honda (JPN)	1
Byambasürengiin Khaliun (MGL)	1

Repechage round 2
Amelia Tomala (POL)	0
Ekaterina Chikanova (AIN)	9
Madisyn Grof (CAN)	4
Nargiz Samadova (AZE)	9

Bronze medal match
Ekaterina Chikanova (AIN)	2
Tuba Demir (TUR)	12
Nargiz Samadova (AZE)	8^{F}
Karina Honda (JPN)	7

=== 57 kg ===
5 and 6 September

Final

Final
Bertha Rojas (MEX)	2
Sowaka Uchida (JPN)	12

Top half

Round of 32
Lara Görcs (SVK)	9
Mendi Shogzhap (AIN)	2
Jana Petrović (SRB)	0
Gülsüm Bingöl (TUR)	10
Alina Filipovych (UKR)	13
Lu Xinyue (CHN)	2

Round of 16
Marta Hetmanava (AIN)	4
Bertha Rojas (MEX)	8
Lara Görcs (SVK)	0
Myagmarsürengiin Nomin-Erdene (MGL)	10
Shugyla Omirbek (KAZ)	5
Gülsüm Bingöl (TUR)	0
Alina Filipovych (UKR)	6^{F}
Lee Yu-been (KOR)	0

Quarterfinals
Bertha Rojas (MEX)	2
Myagmarsürengiin Nomin-Erdene (MGL)	1
Shugyla Omirbek (KAZ)	6
Alina Filipovych (UKR)	9

Semifinals
Bertha Rojas (MEX)	8
Alina Filipovych (UKR)	4

Bottom half

Round of 32
Marie Trayer (GER)	2
Annika Fines (CAN)	5
Georgiana Lircă (ROU)	0
Neha Sangwan (IND)	10

Round of 16
Nikola Wiśniewska (POL)	10^{F}
Romaïssa El Kharroubi (FRA)	0
Annika Fines (CAN)	1
Gerda Terék (HUN)	12
Liao Pei-ying (TPE)	0
Neha Sangwan (IND)	8^{F}
Carissa Qureshi (USA)	0
Sowaka Uchida (JPN)	10

Quarterfinals
Nikola Wiśniewska (POL)	0
Gerda Terék (HUN)	2^{F}
Neha Sangwan (IND)	2
Sowaka Uchida (JPN)	12

Semifinals
Gerda Terék (HUN)	0
Sowaka Uchida (JPN)	10

Repechage round 2
Marta Hetmanava (AIN)	3
Myagmarsürengiin Nomin-Erdene (MGL)	3
Carissa Qureshi (USA)	4
Neha Sangwan (IND)	15

Bronze medal match
Marta Hetmanava (AIN)	6
Alina Filipovych (UKR)	1
Neha Sangwan (IND)	10
Gerda Terék (HUN)	8

=== 59 kg ===
4 and 5 September

Final

Final
Alexis Janiak (USA)	0
Sakura Onishi (JPN)	10

Top half

Round of 32
Luna Rothenberger (GER)	4
Sevim Akbaş (TUR)	11

Round of 16
Uladzislava Kudzin (AIN)	3^{F}
Angelina Pervukhina (KAZ)	3
Sevim Akbaş (TUR)	10
Rosa Molina (ESP)	0
Anna Tieliegina (LTU)	4
Alexis Janiak (USA)	9
Viktória Borsos (HUN)	3
Anna Karbovska (UKR)	1

Quarterfinals
Uladzislava Kudzin (AIN)	8^{F}
Sevim Akbaş (TUR)	1
Alexis Janiak (USA)	11
Viktória Borsos (HUN)	3

Semifinals
Uladzislava Kudzin (AIN)	2
Alexis Janiak (USA)	10

Bottom half

Round of 32

Round of 16
Zhu Yifan (CHN)	4^{F}
Mădălina Prisacari (MDA)	2
Ruzanna Mammadova (AZE)	4^{F}
Nicola Wasilewska (POL)	2
Komal (IND)	4
Aitolkun Medet Kyzy (KGZ)	2
Sakura Onishi (JPN)	10
Elena Kurova (AIN)	0

Quarterfinals
Zhu Yifan (CHN)	0
Ruzanna Mammadova (AZE)	4
Komal (IND)	0
Sakura Onishi (JPN)	10

Semifinals
Ruzanna Mammadova (AZE)	0
Sakura Onishi (JPN)	10

Repechage round 2
Anna Tieliegina (LTU)	8^{F}
Viktória Borsos (HUN)	4
Elena Kurova (AIN)	0
Komal (IND)	3^{F}

Bronze medal match
Anna Tieliegina (LTU)	6^{F}
Uladzislava Kudzin (AIN)	0
Komal (IND)	6
Ruzanna Mammadova (AZE)	1

=== 62 kg ===
5 and 6 September

Final

Final
Iryna Bondar (UKR)	4
Nitika (IND)	1

Top half

Round of 32
Bae Seo-yeon (KOR)	0
Cadence Diduch (USA)	8^{F}
Byambasürengiin Khulan (MGL)	9
Sofya Zmanneva (KAZ)	4
Iryna Bondar (UKR)	10
Tereza Mráčková (CZE)	0
Candela Castro (ESP)	0
Annatina Lippuner (SUI)	11

Round of 16
Melanie Jiménez (MEX)	7^{F}
Cadence Diduch (USA)	0
Byambasürengiin Khulan (MGL)	7
Immacolata Danise (ITA)	11
Li Yen-yi (TPE)	0
Iryna Bondar (UKR)	10
Annatina Lippuner (SUI)	5
Hiunai Hurbanova (AZE)	16

Quarterfinals
Melanie Jiménez (MEX)	7
Immacolata Danise (ITA)	2
Iryna Bondar (UKR)	10^{F}
Hiunai Hurbanova (AZE)	4

Semifinals
Melanie Jiménez (MEX)	3
Iryna Bondar (UKR)	4

Bottom half

Round of 32
Bronwyn MacGregor (CAN)	0
Tancholpon Kybalbekova (KGZ)	10
~~Anna Fotiadou (GRE)~~
Selvi İlyasoğlu (TUR)	WO
Han Shuang (CHN)	12
Nagisa Ito (JPN)	14
Amelia Samuelsson (SWE)	6
Marharyta Koush (AIN)	3

Round of 16
Farah Ali Hussein (EGY)	4^{F}
Tancholpon Kybalbekova (KGZ)	5
Selvi İlyasoğlu (TUR)	0
Nitika (IND)	4^{F}
Olga Iatsenko (AIN)	0
Nagisa Ito (JPN)	11
Amelia Samuelsson (SWE)	5
Naemi Leistner (GER)	2

Quarterfinals
Farah Ali Hussein (EGY)	2
Nitika (IND)	12
Nagisa Ito (JPN)	8
Amelia Samuelsson (SWE)	4

Semifinals
Nitika (IND)	7
Nagisa Ito (JPN)	3

Repechage round 1
Tereza Mráčková (CZE)	0
Li Yen-yi (TPE)	10

Repechage round 2
Li Yen-yi (TPE)	2
Hiunai Hurbanova (AZE)	8
Selvi İlyasoğlu (TUR)	6^{F}
Farah Ali Hussein (EGY)	0

Bronze medals
Hiunai Hurbanova (AZE)	0
Melanie Jiménez (MEX)	6^{F}
Selvi İlyasoğlu (TUR)	9
Nagisa Ito (JPN)	10

=== 65 kg ===
5 and 6 September

Final

Final
Beyza Nur Akkuş (TUR)	1
Nana Ikehata (JPN)	8

Top half

Round of 32
Michelle Olea (MEX)	0
Yuliia Pakhniuk (UKR)	8

Round of 16
Beyza Nur Akkuş (TUR)	10
Elvira Martínez-Barquero (ESP)	0
Yuliia Pakhniuk (UKR)	11
Viktória Földešiová (SVK)	0
Alicja Nowosad (POL)	10
Aliaksandra Zhuk (AIN)	4
Reese Larramendy (USA)	7
Margarita Salnazarian (AIN)	10

Quarterfinals
Beyza Nur Akkuş (TUR)	6
Yuliia Pakhniuk (UKR)	3
Alicja Nowosad (POL)	2
Margarita Salnazarian (AIN)	6

Semifinals
Beyza Nur Akkuş (TUR)	10
Margarita Salnazarian (AIN)	0

Bottom half

Round of 32

Round of 16
Maša Perović (SRB)	2
Korlan Amanova (KAZ)	4
Rui Zaixue (CHN)	7^{F}
Enikő Elekes (HUN)	6
Mawadda Hamdun (EGY)	1
Erdene-Ochiryn Odgerel (MGL)	12
Sarika Malik (IND)	0
Nana Ikehata (JPN)	10

Quarterfinals
Korlan Amanova (KAZ)	4
Rui Zaixue (CHN)	9
Erdene-Ochiryn Odgerel (MGL)	0
Nana Ikehata (JPN)	10

Semifinals
Rui Zaixue (CHN)	0
Nana Ikehata (JPN)	10

Repechage round 1
Elvira Martínez-Barquero (ESP)	0
Yuliia Pakhniuk (UKR)	12^{F}
Sarika Malik (IND)	8
Erdene-Ochiryn Odgerel (MGL)	1

Bronze medal match
Yuliia Pakhniuk (UKR)	5
Margarita Salnazarian (AIN)	8
Sarika Malik (IND)	3
Rui Zaixue (CHN)	7

=== 68 kg ===
4 and 5 September

Round of 16
Caitlyn Davis (USA)	7
Gulnura Tashtanbekova (KGZ)	18
Maria Panțîru (ROU)	0
Karolina Domaszuk (POL)	3^{F}
Emilija Jakovljević (SRB)	0
Ayşe Erkan (TUR)	4^{F}
Jiang Yan-ju (TPE)	12
María Civantos (ESP)	2
Viktoryia Radzkova (AIN)	10
Beibit Seidualy (KAZ)	0
Seia Mochinaga (JPN)	4
Anna Poshtar (UKR)	4
Alina Shevchenko (AIN)	12
Vanessa Keefe (CAN)	1
Luciana Beda (MDA)	0
Srishti Janghu (IND)	5

Quarterfinals
Gulnura Tashtanbekova (KGZ)	1
Karolina Domaszuk (POL)	13
Ayşe Erkan (TUR)	10
Jiang Yan-ju (TPE)	0
Viktoryia Radzkova (AIN)	4
Seia Mochinaga (JPN)	1
Alina Shevchenko (AIN)	6
Srishti Janghu (IND)	5

Semifinals
Karolina Domaszuk (POL)	2
Ayşe Erkan (TUR)	14
Viktoryia Radzkova (AIN)	2
Alina Shevchenko (AIN)	5

Final
Ayşe Erkan (TUR)	2
Alina Shevchenko (AIN)	12^{F}

Repechage round
Emilija Jakovljević (SRB)	3
Jiang Yan-ju (TPE)	1
Vanessa Keefe (CAN)	0
Srishti Janghu (IND)	8^{F}

Bronze medal match
Emilija Jakovljević (SRB)	0
Karolina Domaszuk (POL)	7^{F}
Srishti Janghu (IND)	7
Viktoryia Radzkova (AIN)	0

=== 72 kg ===
5 and 6 September

Legend

- F — Won by fall

Final

Final
Liu Yuqi (CHN)	6
Jasmine Robinson (USA)	11^{F}

Top half

Round of 32
Yasmin Alonso (ESP)	6
Gia Kastelan (CRO)	8

Round of 16
Iryna Zablotska (UKR)	0
Liu Yuqi (CHN)	10
Gia Kastelan (CRO)	0
Tehani Blais (CAN)	7^{F}
Elvira Ersson (SWE)	10
Zhibekzhan Sabyrzhanova (KAZ)	0
Krystsina Kurkina (AIN)	2
Karolina Jaworska (POL)	10^{F}

Quarterfinals
Liu Yuqi (CHN)	10
Tehani Blais (CAN)	0
Elvira Ersson (SWE)	10
Karolina Jaworska (POL)	0

Semifinals
Liu Yuqi (CHN)	10
Elvira Ersson (SWE)	0

Bottom half

Round of 32
Kristina Bratchikova (AIN)	11^{F}
Ai Sakai (JPN)	2

Round of 16
Otgonbatyn Tselmüün (MGL)	1
Manju (IND)	11
Kaiyrkul Sharshebaeva (KGZ)	0
Noémi Osváth-Nagy (HUN)	11
Haticenur Sarı (TUR)	2
Kristina Bratchikova (AIN)	2^{F}
Edna Jiménez (MEX)	0
Jasmine Robinson (USA)	6^{F}

Quarterfinals
Manju (IND)	1
Noémi Osváth-Nagy (HUN)	4
Kristina Bratchikova (AIN)	0
Jasmine Robinson (USA)	4^{F}

Semifinals
Noémi Osváth-Nagy (HUN)	0
Jasmine Robinson (USA)	8^{F}

Repechage round 2
Iryna Zablotska (UKR)	7^{F}
Tehani Blais (CAN)	0
Edna Jiménez (MEX)	2
Kristina Bratchikova (AIN)	12

Bronze medal match
Iryna Zablotska (UKR)	1
Elvira Ersson (SWE)	7
Kristina Bratchikova (AIN)	0
Noémi Osváth-Nagy (HUN)	9

=== 76 kg ===
4 and 5 September

Round of 16
Alina Yertostik (KAZ)	4
Sofiia Bubnova (AIN)	3^{F}
Jyoti Berwal (IND)	4
Taravyn Tüvshinjargal (MGL)	0
Patrycja Cuber (POL)	2
Veronika Nyikos (HUN)	5

Quarterfinals
Chisato Yoshida (JPN)	11
Sofiia Bubnova (AIN)	6
Naomi Simon (USA)	8
Mariia Orlevych (UKR)	9
Zhang Meile (CHN)	1
Jyoti Berwal (IND)	5
Veronika Nyikos (HUN)	6
Elmira Yasin (TUR)	8

Semifinals
Chisato Yoshida (JPN)	0
Mariia Orlevych (UKR)	5
Jyoti Berwal (IND)	7
Elmira Yasin (TUR)	0

Final
Mariia Orlevych (UKR)	0
Jyoti Berwal (IND)	5

Repechage round 1
Taravyn Tüvshinjargal (MGL)	2
Zhang Meile (CHN)	2

Bronze medal match
Naomi Simon (USA)	9
Chisato Yoshida (JPN)	0
Taravyn Tüvshinjargal (MGL)	2
Elmira Yasin (TUR)	8

== See also ==
- 2024 U20 World Wrestling Championships – Men's freestyle
- 2024 U20 World Wrestling Championships – Men's Greco-Roman
