= 2024 U20 World Wrestling Championships – Men's Greco-Roman =

The men's Greco-Roman competitions at the 2024 U20 World Wrestling Championships were held in Pontevedra, Spain between 2 and 4 September 2024.

== Men's Greco-Roman ==
=== 55 kg ===
2 and 3 September

Legend

- F — Won by fall

Final

Final
Isaiah Cortez (USA)	3
Ali Ahmadi Vafa (IRI)	11

Top half

Round of 32
Isaiah Cortez (USA)	9
Anil Mor (IND)	8

Round of 16
Panteleimon Pissakis (GRE)	0
Maxim Sarmanov (MDA)	8
Isaiah Cortez (USA)	7
Péter Tótok (HUN)	4
James Castaño (ESP)	0
Aibek Aitbekov (KAZ)	8
Daisuke Morishita (JPN)	4
Giorgi Kochalidze (GEO)	14^{F}

Quarterfinals
Maxim Sarmanov (MDA)	6
Isaiah Cortez (USA)	9
Aibek Aitbekov (KAZ)	8
Giorgi Kochalidze (GEO)	0

Semifinals
Isaiah Cortez (USA)	9
Aibek Aitbekov (KAZ)	0

Bottom half

Round of 32
Barsbek Asankozhoev (KGZ)	9
Armen Gevorgyan (ARM)	1
Rahim Hasanov (AZE)	8
Filip Bartošík (CZE)	0

Round of 16
Şervan Çınar (TUR)	0
Alibek Amirov (AIN)	8
Barsbek Asankozhoev (KGZ)	8
Ivan Stefanskyi (UKR)	0
Hassan Al-Harthi (KSA)	2
Rahim Hasanov (AZE)	11
Ali Ahmadi Vafa (IRI)	9
Shi Huoying (CHN)	0

Quarterfinals
Alibek Amirov (AIN)	9
Barsbek Asankozhoev (KGZ)	0
Rahim Hasanov (AZE)	1
Ali Ahmadi Vafa (IRI)	6

Semifinals
Alibek Amirov (AIN)	3
Ali Ahmadi Vafa (IRI)	6

Repechage round 1
Anil Mor (IND)	5
Péter Tótok (HUN)	9

Repechage round 2
Péter Tótok (HUN)	1
Maxim Sarmanov (MDA)	4
Shi Huoying (CHN)	1
Rahim Hasanov (AZE)	10

Bronze medals
Maxim Sarmanov (MDA)	1
Aibek Aitbekov (KAZ)	10
Rahim Hasanov (AZE)	0
Alibek Amirov (AIN)	10

=== 60 kg ===
3 and 4 September

Legend

- F — Won by fall
- WO — Won by walkover

Final

Final
Mohammad Mehdi Gholampour (IRI)	9
Servet Angı (TUR)	0

Top half

Round of 32
Hu Yunlong (CHN)	5
Tamazi Glonti (GEO)	4
Ilias Zairakis (GRE)	0
Cory Land (USA)	8
Tural Ahmadov (AZE)	4
David Díaz (ESP)	3
Yevhen Pokovba (UKR)	1
Adam Silverin (SWE)	1

Round of 16
Munthir Jandu (KSA)	1
Hu Yunlong (CHN)	5
Cory Land (USA)	4
Papik Dzhavadian (AIN)	6
Mohammad Mehdi Gholampour (IRI)	5
Tural Ahmadov (AZE)	1
Adam Silverin (SWE)	3
Dominik Partyka (POL)	3

Quarterfinals
Hu Yunlong (CHN)	1
Papik Dzhavadian (AIN)	2
Mohammad Mehdi Gholampour (IRI)	10
Dominik Partyka (POL)	0

Semifinals
Papik Dzhavadian (AIN)	8
Mohammad Mehdi Gholampour (IRI)	9

Bottom half

Round of 32
Kohaku Kanazawa (JPN)	5
Servet Angı (TUR)	9
Kristiyan Milenkov (BUL)	3
Alin Muraru (MDA)	1
Ongdassyn Khamitov (KAZ)	12
Mohit Narwal (IND)	2
Armen Sukiasyan (ARM)	10
Said Turatbek Uulu (KGZ)	5

Round of 16
Eli Kirk (PUR)	0
Servet Angı (TUR)	9
Kristiyan Milenkov (BUL)	6
Ahmed Abdelbary Shaban (EGY)	12
Daniel Guevara (MEX)	0
Ongdassyn Khamitov (KAZ)	9
Armen Sukiasyan (ARM)	5
Edmond Domokos (HUN)	7

Quarterfinals
Servet Angı (TUR)	9
Ahmed Abdelbary Shaban (EGY)	0
Ongdassyn Khamitov (KAZ)	9
Edmond Domokos (HUN)	0

Semifinals
Servet Angı (TUR)	9
Ongdassyn Khamitov (KAZ)	8

Repechage round 1
Kohaku Kanazawa (JPN)	WO
Eli Kirk (PUR)

Repechage round 2
Tural Ahmadov (AZE)	9
Dominik Partyka (POL)	1
Kohaku Kanazawa (JPN)	4
Ahmed Abdelbary Shaban (EGY)	2

Bronze medals
Tural Ahmadov (AZE)	0
Papik Dzhavadian (AIN)	2
Kohaku Kanazawa (JPN)	0
Ongdassyn Khamitov (KAZ)	9

=== 63 kg ===
2 and 3 September

Final

Final
Erzu Zakriev (AIN)	8
Otto Black (USA)	0

Top half

Round of 32
Erzu Zakriev (AIN)	10
Pavel Denisenko (MDA)	0
Mathias Martinetti (SUI)	2
Wang Zhiyu (CHN)	5
Hristo Valentinov (BUL)	0
Mahammad Shukurzade (AZE)	7
Emirlan Duishenaliev (KGZ)	9
Ilian Ainaoui (FRA)	0
Maksym Chuhuiev (UKR)	0
Shina Yasumi (JPN)	8

Round of 16
Erfan Jarkani (IRI)	0
Erzu Zakriev (AIN)	11
Wang Zhiyu (CHN)	1
Mahammad Shukurzade (AZE)	2
Anri Khozrevanidze (GEO)	5
Emirlan Duishenaliev (KGZ)	1
Shina Yasumi (JPN)	4
Seo Byeong-gi (KOR)	8

Quarterfinals
Erzu Zakriev (AIN)	9^{F}
Mahammad Shukurzade (AZE)	4
Anri Khozrevanidze (GEO)	3
Seo Byeong-gi (KOR)	3

Semifinals
Erzu Zakriev (AIN)	16
Anri Khozrevanidze (GEO)	4

Bottom half

Round of 32
Dejan Berkec (SRB)	7
Matej Rebić (CRO)	1
Zachary Marrero (PUR)	0
Enes Ülkü (TUR)	9
William Ekerot (SWE)	8
Matouš Jankovič (CZE)	0
Nishant (IND)	2
Yurik Hoveyan (ARM)	3

Round of 16
Otto Black (USA)	5
Dejan Berkec (SRB)	1
Enes Ülkü (TUR)	4
Adham El-Sayed (EGY)	4
Mario Trujillo (ESP)	0
William Ekerot (SWE)	9
Yurik Hoveyan (ARM)	9
Bagdat Sabaz (KAZ)	1

Quarterfinals
Otto Black (USA)	7
Enes Ülkü (TUR)	6
William Ekerot (SWE)	2
Yurik Hoveyan (ARM)	4

Semifinals
Otto Black (USA)	7
Yurik Hoveyan (ARM)	2

Repechage round 1
Pavel Denisenko (MDA)	0
Erfan Jarkani (IRI)	9

Repechage round 2
Erfan Jarkani (IRI)	3
Mahammad Shukurzade (AZE)	1
Dejan Berkec (SRB)	0
Enes Ülkü (TUR)	11

Bronze medal match
Erfan Jarkani (IRI)	6
Anri Khozrevanidze (GEO)	2
Enes Ülkü (TUR)	1
Yurik Hoveyan (ARM)	2

=== 67 kg ===
3 and 4 September

Legend

- F — Won by fall
- WO — Won by walkover

Final

Final
Yussuf Ashrapov (KAZ)	0
Ahmad Reza Mohsennejad (IRI)	2

Top half

Round of 32
Vladimir Pascari (MDA)	8
Isa Bektemirov (AUT)	0
Zhen Kang (CHN)	9
Dimitar Georgiev (BUL)	1
Sachin (IND)	3
Grair Oganesian (AIN)	5
Joel Adams (USA)	2
Imed Khudzhadze (UKR)	5
Yussuf Ashrapov (KAZ)	10
Iosif Ionescu (ROU)	1

Round of 16
Artur Jeremejev (EST)	2^{F}
Vladimir Pascari (MDA)	1
Zhen Kang (CHN)	0
Grair Oganesian (AIN)	10
Piotr Skalik (POL)	0
Imed Khudzhadze (UKR)	9
Yussuf Ashrapov (KAZ)	10
Rati Khozrevanidze (GEO)	1

Quarterfinals
Artur Jeremejev (EST)	0
Grair Oganesian (AIN)	8
Imed Khudzhadze (UKR)	1
Yussuf Ashrapov (KAZ)	2

Semifinals
Grair Oganesian (AIN)	5
Yussuf Ashrapov (KAZ)	7

Bottom half

Round of 32
Ahmad Reza Mohsennejad (IRI)	9
Ramazan Can Aktaş (TUR)	0
Tim Bergfalk (SWE)	WO
~~Sunat Abdulloev (TJK)~~
Baiaman Karimov (KGZ)	0
Tavakgul Haziyev (AZE)	10
Gaspar Terteryan (ARM)	10
Attila Józsa (HUN)	1

Round of 16
Daniel Campos (ESP)	0
Ahmad Reza Mohsennejad (IRI)	8
Tim Bergfalk (SWE)	3
Kipras Puikis (LTU)	0
Kojiro Hasegawa (JPN)	7
Tavakgul Haziyev (AZE)	3
Gaspar Terteryan (ARM)	6
Fritz Reber (SUI)	1

Quarterfinals
Ahmad Reza Mohsennejad (IRI)	10
Tim Bergfalk (SWE)	0
Kojiro Hasegawa (JPN)	7
Gaspar Terteryan (ARM)	5

Semifinals
Ahmad Reza Mohsennejad (IRI)	10
Kojiro Hasegawa (JPN)	0

Repechage round 1
Iosif Ionescu (ROU)	0
Rati Khozrevanidze (GEO)	10
Ramazan Can Aktaş (TUR)	8
Daniel Campos (ESP)	0

Repechage round 2
Rati Khozrevanidze (GEO)	10
Imed Khudzhadze (UKR)	5
Ramazan Can Aktaş (TUR)	4
Tim Bergfalk (SWE)	3

Bronze medal match
Rati Khozrevanidze (GEO)	0
Grair Oganesian (AIN)	9
Ramazan Can Aktaş (TUR)	7
Kojiro Hasegawa (JPN)	8

=== 72 kg ===
3 and 4 September

Legend

- F — Won by fall

Final

Final
Ashot Khachatryan (ARM)	5
Zaur Beslekoev (AIN)	6

Top half

Round of 32
Hu Wenhao (CHN)	3
Arionas Kolitsopoulos (GRE)	1
Magomed Kartojew (GER)	4
Rokas Čepauskas (LTU)	6
Ashot Khachatryan (ARM)	14
Lee Gun-hee (KOR)	2
Petro Shafranskyi (UKR)	3
Luka Ivančić (CRO)	6
Luka Kajanne (FIN)	1
Denny Chjan (SWE)	1
Gonzalo Caparrós (ESP)	0
Aakash Punia (IND)	9
Ruslan Nurullayev (AZE)	9
Vasile Zabica (MDA)	1

Round of 16
Abdulaziz Askarbekov (KGZ)	7
Hu Wenhao (CHN)	9
Rokas Čepauskas (LTU)	1
Ashot Khachatryan (ARM)	6
Luka Ivančić (CRO)	2
Luka Kajanne (FIN)	0
Aakash Punia (IND)	3
Ruslan Nurullayev (AZE)	5

Quarterfinals
Hu Wenhao (CHN)	4
Ashot Khachatryan (ARM)	9
Luka Ivančić (CRO)	0
Ruslan Nurullayev (AZE)	8

Semifinals
Ashot Khachatryan (ARM)	4
Ruslan Nurullayev (AZE)	1

Bottom half

Qualification
Muhammed Ali Göçmen (TUR)	6
Leonard Iuraşcu (ROU)	0
Hajime Kikuta (JPN)	9
Nika Glonti (GEO)	1
Hubert Sidoruk (POL)	6^{F}
Patrick Brackett (USA)	0
Illia Valeuski (AIN)	11
Alikhan Dursunov (KAZ)	1
Zalan Pek (SRB)	0
Zaur Beslekoev (AIN)	8
Dalgat Magomedov (CZE)	0
Moustafa Alameldin (EGY)	8

Round of 16
Max Hristjuk (EST)	0
Muhammed Ali Göçmen (TUR)	6^{F}
Hajime Kikuta (JPN)	9
Hubert Sidoruk (POL)	0
Illia Valeuski (AIN)	1
Zaur Beslekoev (AIN)	4
Moustafa Alameldin (EGY)	9
Ahoura Bouveiri (IRI)	5

Quarterfinals
Muhammed Ali Göçmen (TUR)	3
Hajime Kikuta (JPN)	0
Zaur Beslekoev (AIN)	4
Moustafa Alameldin (EGY)	1

Semifinals
Muhammed Ali Göçmen (TUR)	1
Zaur Beslekoev (AIN)	1

Repechage round 1
Lee Gun-hee (KOR)	4
Rokas Čepauskas (LTU)	3
Zalan Pek (SRB)	3
Illia Valeuski (AIN)	6

Repechage round 2
Lee Gun-hee (KOR)	1
Hu Wenhao (CHN)	3
Illia Valeuski (AIN)	3
Moustafa Alameldin (EGY)	1

Bronze medal match
Hu Wenhao (CHN)	5
Ruslan Nurullayev (AZE)	6
Illia Valeuski (AIN)	3
Muhammed Ali Göçmen (TUR)	4

=== 77 kg ===
2 and 3 September

Final

Final
Magomed Iarbilov (AIN)	1
Alireza Abdevali (IRI)	3

Top half

Round of 32
Magomed Iarbilov (AIN)	9
Yujin Takahashi (JPN)	0
Henrik Gevorgyan (ARM)	2
Dias Seitkaliyev (KAZ)	4
Davud Mammadov (AZE)	0
Alexandru Solovei (MDA)	8

Round of 16
Levente Lévai (HUN)	5
Ibrahim Tabaev (BEL)	1
Magomed Iarbilov (AIN)	8
Vikke Tarkkio (FIN)	0
Irfan Mirzoiev (UKR)	8
Dias Seitkaliyev (KAZ)	0
Alexandru Solovei (MDA)	5
Nurel Duishonbekov (KGZ)	0

Quarterfinals
Levente Lévai (HUN)	1
Magomed Iarbilov (AIN)	9
Irfan Mirzoiev (UKR)	3
Alexandru Solovei (MDA)	2

Semifinals
Magomed Iarbilov (AIN)	6
Irfan Mirzoiev (UKR)	4

Bottom half

Qualification
Yu Jixin (CHN)	5
Alireza Abdevali (IRI)	16
Hugo Baff (SWE)	4
Erkan Tuğcu (TUR)	3
Ognjen Jakovljević (SRB)	9
Iulian Lungu (ROU)	6

Round of 16
Aydin Rix-McElhinney (USA)	3
Alireza Abdevali (IRI)	7
Hugo Baff (SWE)	7
Mihael Lukač (CRO)	0
Tornike Mikeladze (GEO)	5
Ognjen Jakovljević (SRB)	1
José Ángel Teso (ESP)	5
Nishant Phogat (IND)	8

Quarterfinals
Alireza Abdevali (IRI)	2
Hugo Baff (SWE)	1
Tornike Mikeladze (GEO)	8
Nishant Phogat (IND)	0

Semifinals
Alireza Abdevali (IRI)	3
Tornike Mikeladze (GEO)	1

Repechage round 1
Yujin Takahashi (JPN)	0
Vikke Tarkkio (FIN)	9
Yu Jixin (CHN)	3
Aydin Rix-McElhinney (USA)	8

Repechage round 2
Vikke Tarkkio (FIN)	0
Levente Lévai (HUN)	9
Aydin Rix-McElhinney (USA)	0
Hugo Baff (SWE)	9

Bronze medal match
Levente Lévai (HUN)	3
Irfan Mirzoiev (UKR)	2
Hugo Baff (SWE)	3
Tornike Mikeladze (GEO)	5

=== 82 kg ===
3 and 4 September

Legend

- F — Won by fall
- WO — Won by walkover

Final

Final
Alperen Berber (TUR)	3
Islam Yevloyev (KAZ)	9

Top half

Round of 32
Erik Ter-Matevosyan (ARM)	11
Miloš Perović (SRB)	3
Stanisław Fussy (POL)	11
Odysseas Roungeris (GRE)	3
Anri Davitadze (GEO)	1
Alperen Berber (TUR)	7
Antonio Lukač (CRO)	0
Jesper Härkänen (FIN)	9
Mahmoud Ibrahim (EGY)	2
Dominik Czuczor (HUN)	1

Round of 16
Prince (IND)	0
Erik Ter-Matevosyan (ARM)	8
Stanisław Fussy (POL)
Alperen Berber (TUR)	WO
Arian Khosravy (USA)	3
Jesper Härkänen (FIN)	0
Mahmoud Ibrahim (EGY)	3
Taizo Yoshida (JPN)	7

Quarterfinals
Erik Ter-Matevosyan (ARM)	1
Alperen Berber (TUR)	1
Arian Khosravy (USA)	1
Taizo Yoshida (JPN)	8

Semifinals
Alperen Berber (TUR)	12
Taizo Yoshida (JPN)	0

Bottom half

Round of 32
Ramazan Pashaiev (UKR)	0
Abdurakhman Abdulkadyrov (AIN)	9
Erlan Mars Uulu (KGZ)	0
Mohammad Arjmand (IRI)	9
Yoon Suk-min (KOR)	14
Mahmoud Hawsawi (KSA)	3
Islam Yevloyev (KAZ)	9
Jan Dušek (CZE)	1

Round of 16
Răzvan Pavalasc (ROU)	0
Abdurakhman Abdulkadyrov (AIN)	9
Mohammad Arjmand (IRI)	4
Ismail Rzayev (AZE)	13
Zheng Shichang (CHN)	8
Yoon Suk-min (KOR)	0
Islam Yevloyev (KAZ)	8
Anton Buchholz (GER)	0

Quarterfinals
Abdurakhman Abdulkadyrov (AIN)	11
Ismail Rzayev (AZE)	0
Zheng Shichang (CHN)	0
Islam Yevloyev (KAZ)	8

Semifinals
Abdurakhman Abdulkadyrov (AIN) (INJ)	0^{R}
Islam Yevloyev (KAZ)	0

Repechage round 1
Anri Davitadze (GEO)	WO
Stanisław Fussy (POL)
Jan Dušek (CZE)	2
Anton Buchholz (GER)	3

Repechage round 2
Anri Davitadze (GEO)	4^{F}
Erik Ter-Matevosyan (ARM)	1
Anton Buchholz (GER)	1
Zheng Shichang (CHN)	4

Bronze medal match
Anri Davitadze (GEO)	1
Taizo Yoshida (JPN)	6
Zheng Shichang (CHN)	WO
Abdurakhman Abdulkadyrov (AIN)

=== 87 kg ===
2 and 3 September

Legend

- WO — Won by walkover

Final

Final
Asan Zhanyshov (KGZ)	8
Joju Samadov (AZE)	0

Top half

Qualification
Eleftherios Pappas (GRE)	2
Andrey Atanasov (BUL)	2
Ryder Rogotzke (USA)	0
Patrik Gordan (ROU)	8
Achiko Bolkvadze (GEO)	10
Ruben van Wyk (RSA)	0
Hamza Sertcanli (SWE)	2
Mansur Saitov (AIN)	1

Round of 16
Rohit Bura (IND)	2
Eleftherios Pappas (GRE)	5
Patrik Gordan (ROU)	7
Mohammad Hadi Seydi (IRI)	5
Asan Zhanyshov (KGZ)	11
Achiko Bolkvadze (GEO)	3
Hamza Sertcanli (SWE)	3
Brian Ruíz (VEN)	1

Quarterfinals
Eleftherios Pappas (GRE)	0
Patrik Gordan (ROU)	9
Asan Zhanyshov (KGZ)	7
Hamza Sertcanli (SWE)	3

Semifinals
Patrik Gordan (ROU)	0
Asan Zhanyshov (KGZ)	8

Bottom half

Qualification
Ruben Gevorgyan (ARM)	10
Pavlo Torianyk (UKR)	3
Andrija Mihajlović (SRB)	4
Kauan Gomes (BRA)	0
~~Roberto Nsangua (ANG)~~
Wojciech Iwanowski (POL)	WO
Wang Jie (CHN)	4
Emre Bacaksız (TUR)	7

Round of 16
Elias Lyyski (FIN)	2
Ruben Gevorgyan (ARM)	5
Andrija Mihajlović (SRB)	1
Joju Samadov (AZE)	5
Reon Kakegawa (JPN)	8
Wojciech Iwanowski (POL)	5
Emre Bacaksız (TUR)	2
Temirlan Turdakyn (KAZ)	12

Quarterfinals
Ruben Gevorgyan (ARM)	1
Joju Samadov (AZE)	3
Reon Kakegawa (JPN)	3
Temirlan Turdakyn (KAZ)	4

Semifinals
Joju Samadov (AZE)	4
Temirlan Turdakyn (KAZ)	2

Repechage round 2
Achiko Bolkvadze (GEO)	6
Hamza Sertcanli (SWE)	1
Andrija Mihajlović (SRB)	1
Ruben Gevorgyan (ARM)	9

Bronze medal match
Achiko Bolkvadze (GEO)	10
Patrik Gordan (ROU)	0
Ruben Gevorgyan (ARM)	1
Temirlan Turdakyn (KAZ)	3

=== 97 kg ===
3 and 4 September

Legend

- F — Won by fall

Final

Final
Darius Kiefer (GER)	4
Yehor Yakushenko (UKR)	6

Top half

Round of 32
Mikayil Ismayilov (AZE)	5
Dorian Trejo (MEX)	2
Ahmet Eremekter (TUR)	7
Christos Chatsatourov (GRE)	3

Round of 16
Darius Kiefer (GER)	5
Rakhat Berzhanov (KAZ)	1
Mikayil Ismayilov (AZE)	0
Hamidreza Keshtkar (IRI)	7
Rasmus Liisma (EST)	2
Ahmet Eremekter (TUR)	4
Bekzhan Zhumabekov (KGZ)	8
Soren Herzog (USA)	0

Quarterfinals
Darius Kiefer (GER)	2
Hamidreza Keshtkar (IRI)	1
Ahmet Eremekter (TUR)	14
Bekzhan Zhumabekov (KGZ)	7

Semifinals
Darius Kiefer (GER)	4^{F}
Ahmet Eremekter (TUR)	0

Bottom half

Round of 32
Sebastian Warchoł (POL)	0
Anatolii Averin (AIN)	10
Yehor Yakushenko (UKR)	4
Mohamed Abdelnaby Ahmed (EGY)	2

Round of 16
Saba Purtseladze (GEO)	3
Arshak Geghamyan (ARM)	7
Anatolii Averin (AIN)	8
Sun Qianyi (CHN)	0
Branko Đukić (SRB)	1
Yehor Yakushenko (UKR)	1
Naman (IND)	5
Issa Kikuchi (JPN)	1

Quarterfinals
Arshak Geghamyan (ARM)	3
Anatolii Averin (AIN)	4
Yehor Yakushenko (UKR)	8
Naman (IND)	0

Semifinals
Anatolii Averin (AIN)	4
Yehor Yakushenko (UKR)	7

Repechage round 1
Mohamed Abdelnaby Ahmed (EGY)	1
Branko Đukić (SRB)	4

Repechage round 2
Rakhat Berzhanov (KAZ)	7
Hamidreza Keshtkar (IRI)	3
Branko Đukić (SRB)	4
Naman (IND)	1

Bronze medals
Rakhat Berzhanov (KAZ)	1
Ahmet Eremekter (TUR)	5
Branko Đukić (SRB)	3
Anatolii Averin (AIN)	7

=== 130 kg ===
2 and 3 September

Legend

- F — Won by fall

Final

Final
László Darabos (HUN)	5
Abolfazl Fathi Tazangi (IRI)	3

Top half

Round of 32
Min Seung-gyu (KOR)	2
Leonhard Junger (AUT)	2
Cemal Yusuf Bakır (TUR)	10
Jorawar Dhinsa (CAN)	5
Aden Attao (USA)	0
László Darabos (HUN)	9

Round of 16
Rafail Gkirnis (GRE)	0
Aleksandr Melekhov (AIN)	4^{F}
Min Seung-gyu (KOR)	9
Kazushi Iwasaki (JPN)	0
Saba Chilashvili (GEO)	1
Cemal Yusuf Bakır (TUR)	3
László Darabos (HUN)	8
Ethan Vergara (PUR)	0

Quarterfinals
Aleksandr Melekhov (AIN)	9
Min Seung-gyu (KOR)	0
Cemal Yusuf Bakır (TUR)	1
László Darabos (HUN)	3

Semifinals
Aleksandr Melekhov (AIN)	1
László Darabos (HUN)	3

Bottom half

Round of 32
Artur Sarkisjan (CZE)	7
Samagan Ormonov (KGZ)	13
Alan Dzabiev (BUL)	7
Yang Shaoyi (CHN)	6

Round of 16
Mazaim Mardanov (AZE)	2
Marko Šupić (SRB)	0
Samagan Ormonov (KGZ)	0
Abolfazl Fathi Tazangi (IRI)	8
Artur Boichuk (UKR)	6
Alan Dzabiev (BUL)	2
Aramayis Harutyunyan (ARM)	10
Uttam Rana (IND)	2

Quarterfinals
Mazaim Mardanov (AZE)	5
Abolfazl Fathi Tazangi (IRI)	9
Artur Boichuk (UKR)	1
Aramayis Harutyunyan (ARM)	1

Semifinals
Abolfazl Fathi Tazangi (IRI)	2
Aramayis Harutyunyan (ARM)	1

Repechage round 1
Aden Attao (USA)	8
Ethan Vergara (PUR)	0

Repechage round 2
Aden Attao (USA)	5
Cemal Yusuf Bakır (TUR)	5
Samagan Ormonov (KGZ)	9
Mazaim Mardanov (AZE)	0

Bronze medals
Aden Attao (USA)	4^{F}
Aleksandr Melekhov (AIN)	3
Samagan Ormonov (KGZ)	3^{F}
Aramayis Harutyunyan (ARM)	3

== See also ==
- 2024 U20 World Wrestling Championships – Men's freestyle
- 2024 U20 World Wrestling Championships – Women's freestyle
