= 2026 European Wrestling Championships – Women's freestyle 59 kg =

Wrestling competition held in Tirana, Albania

Women's freestyle 59 kg at the 2026 European Wrestling Championships
- Venue: Tirana Olympic Park
- Location: Tirana, Albania
- Dates: 22–23 April
- Competitors: 11 from 9 nations

Medalists
| gold medal | Mariia Vynnyk | Ukraine |
| silver medal | Jowita Wrzesień | Poland |
| bronze medal | Hiunai Hurbanova | Azerbaijan |
| bronze medal | Svetlana Lipatova |

The women's freestyle 59 kilograms competition at the 2026 European Wrestling Championships was held from 22 to 23 April 2026 at the Tirana Olympic Park in Tirana, Albania.

== Results ==
Legend

- F — Won by fall
- R — Retired

=== Main bracket ===
Round of 16
Erika Bognár (HUN) | 0
Marta Hetmanava (UWW) | 8
Svetlana Lipatova (UWW) | 4
Viktoria Boynova (BUL) | 1^{R}
Anna Tieliegina (LTU) | 0
Jowita Wrzesień (POL) | 5

Quarterfinals
Mariia Vynnyk (UKR) | 10
Marta Hetmanava (UWW) | 0
Hiunai Hurbanova (AZE) | 7
Elena Brugger (GER) | 0
Bediha Gün (TUR) | 1
Svetlana Lipatova (UWW) | 2
Jowita Wrzesień (POL) | 7
Othelie Høie (NOR) | 5

Semifinals
Mariia Vynnyk (UKR) | 6
Hiunai Hurbanova (AZE) | 2
Svetlana Lipatova (UWW) | 2
Jowita Wrzesień (POL) | 4

Final
Mariia Vynnyk (UKR) | 8
Jowita Wrzesień (POL) | 4

=== Repechage ===
Repechage round 1
Anna Tieliegina (LTU) | 2
Othelie Høie (NOR) | 11

Bronze medal matches
Marta Hetmanava (UWW) | 5
Hiunai Hurbanova (AZE) | 7
Othelie Høie (NOR) | 1
Svetlana Lipatova (UWW) | 6^{F}

== Final standing ==
| Rank | Wrestler |
|---|---|
| 1st place, gold medalist(s) | Mariia Vynnyk (UKR) |
| 2nd place, silver medalist(s) | Jowita Wrzesień (POL) |
| 3rd place, bronze medalist(s) | Hiunai Hurbanova (AZE) |
| 3rd place, bronze medalist(s) | Svetlana Lipatova (UWW) |
| 5 | Marta Hetmanava (UWW) |
| 5 | Othelie Høie (NOR) |
| 7 | Anna Tieliegina (LTU) |
| 8 | Bediha Gün (TUR) |
| 9 | Viktoria Boynova (BUL) |
| 10 | Elena Brugger (GER) |
| 11 | Erika Bognár (HUN) |
