= 2025 U20 World Wrestling Championships – Women's freestyle =

The women's freestyle competitions at the 2025 U20 World Wrestling Championships were held in Samokov, Bulgaria between 17 and 24 August 2025.

== Women's freestyle ==
Legend

- F — Won by fall
- R — Retired
- C — Won by 3 cautions given to the opponent
- WO — Won by walkover

=== 50 kg ===
21 and 22 August

Final

Final
Rinka Ogawa (JPN)	9
Audrey Jimenez (USA)	3

Top half

Qualification
Laura Fáth (HUN)	2
Songül Kavak (TUR)	7
Violetta Biriukova (UWW)	8
Réka Hegedüs (SVK)	4

Round of 16
Josephine Wrensch (GER)	0
Rinka Ogawa (JPN)	9^{F}
Songül Kavak (TUR)	8
Meiramgul Akhmetzhan (KAZ)	4
Shruti Kundu (IND)	5
Violetta Biriukova (UWW)	4
Anna Yatskevych (POL)	WO
~~Kamryn Mason (CAN)~~

Quarterfinals
Rinka Ogawa (JPN)	4^{F}
Songül Kavak (TUR)	0
Shruti Kundu (IND)	4
Anna Yatskevych (POL)	0

Semifinals
Rinka Ogawa (JPN)	11
Shruti Kundu (IND)	0

Bottom half

Qualification
Sviatlana Katenka (UWW)	8
Olivia van Kleunen (NED)	0
Juliette Lescure (FRA)	4
Dilnaz Abdykadyrova (KGZ)	1

Round of 16
Audrey Jimenez (USA)	10
Adriana Danisevičiūtė (LTU)	0
Sviatlana Katenka (UWW)	6
Hu Na (CHN)	6^{F}
Lonisa Reka (KOS)	0
Juliette Lescure (FRA)	11
Diana Rysova (UKR)	5
Nilufar Nurmukhammadova (UZB)	2

Quarterfinals
Audrey Jimenez (USA)	10
Hu Na (CHN)	0
Juliette Lescure (FRA)	1
Diana Rysova (UKR)	2

Semifinals
Audrey Jimenez (USA)	14
Diana Rysova (UKR)	3

Repechage round 2
Josephine Wrensch (GER)	13
Songül Kavak (TUR)	2
Adriana Danisevičiūtė (LTU)	0
Hu Na (CHN)	10

Bronze medal match
Josephine Wrensch (GER)	0
Shruti Kundu (IND)	6
Hu Na (CHN)	9
Diana Rysova (UKR)	5

=== 53 kg ===
21 and 22 August

Final

Final
Natsumi Masuda (JPN)	6
Anastasiia Polska (UKR)	0

Top half

Qualification
Dorentina Nezaj (KOS)	0
Kseniya Kostsenich (AIN)	10^{F}

Round of 16
Angela Casarola (ITA)	0
Natsumi Masuda (JPN)	10
Kseniya Kostsenich (UWW)	12
Lisette Böttker (EST)	0
Brooklyn Glasgow (CAN)	0
Ekaterina Chikanova (UWW)	3
Abbi Cooper (USA)	10
Nikol Aleksandrova (BUL)	0

Quarterfinals
Natsumi Masuda (JPN)	10
Kseniya Kostsenich (UWW)	2
Ekaterina Chikanova (UWW)	0
Abbi Cooper (USA)	10

Semifinals
Natsumi Masuda (JPN)	9^{F}
Abbi Cooper (USA)	0

Bottom half

Qualification

Round of 16
Anastasiia Polska (UKR)	8^{F}
Liliána Kapuvári (HUN)	0
Chen Ya-hsin (TPE)	4
Ilona Valchuk (POL)	5
Saarika (IND)	12
Şevval Çayır (TUR)	2
Ana Rotaru (ROU)	4
Sun Tianyu (CHN)	7^{F}

Quarterfinals
Anastasiia Polska (UKR)	13
Ilona Valchuk (POL)	2
Saarika (IND)	8
Sun Tianyu (CHN)	0

Semifinals
Anastasiia Polska (UKR)	10
Saarika (IND)	0

Repechage round 2
Angela Casarola (ITA)	6
Kseniya Kostsenich (UWW)	9
Liliána Kapuvári (HUN)	2
Ilona Valchuk (POL)	12

Bronze medal match
Kseniya Kostsenich (UWW)	11
Abbi Cooper (USA)	10
Ilona Valchuk (POL)	0
Saarika (IND)	11

=== 55 kg ===
20 and 21 August

Final

Final
Reena Sangwan (IND)	2
Everest Leydecker (USA)	10

Top half

Qualification
Byambasürengiin Khaliun (MGL)	WO
~~Nesrin Syuleymanova (BUL)~~

Round of 16
Gerda Terék (HUN)	11
Amelia Tomala (POL)	0
Byambasürengiin Khaliun (MGL)	6
Reena Sangwan (IND)	11
Alexandra Voiculescu (ROU)	12
Kira Solobchuk (UWW)	6
Diana Kotvytska (UKR)	10
Pau Gimeno (ESP)	0

Quarterfinals
Gerda Terék (HUN)	2
Reena Sangwan (IND)	8
Alexandra Voiculescu (ROU)	3
Diana Kotvytska (UKR)	2

Semifinals
Reena Sangwan (IND)	11
Alexandra Voiculescu (ROU)	1

Bottom half

Qualification
Tuba Demir (TUR)	4^{F}
Hong Jing (CHN)	3

Round of 16
Aliana Makhambetova (KAZ)	2
So Tsutsui (JPN)	10
Everest Leydecker (USA)	10
Evdoxia Papadopoulou (GRE)	0
Fabiana Rinella (ITA)	1
Tuba Demir (TUR)	12
Lilya Cohen (FRA)	8
Madisyn Grof (CAN)	1

Quarterfinals
So Tsutsui (JPN)	0
Everest Leydecker (USA)	10
Tuba Demir (TUR)	11
Lilya Cohen (FRA)	0

Semifinals
Everest Leydecker (USA)	10
Tuba Demir (TUR)	0

Repechage round 1
Byambasürengiin Khaliun (MGL)	3
Gerda Terék (HUN)	3
Evdoxia Papadopoulou (GRE)	0
So Tsutsui (JPN)	6^{F}

Bronze medal match
Gerda Terék (HUN)	6
Alexandra Voiculescu (ROU)	2
So Tsutsui (JPN)	5
Tuba Demir (TUR)	3

=== 57 kg ===
19 and 20 August

Final

Final
Felicitas Domajeva (NOR)	2
Tapasya Gahlawat (IND)	5

Top half

Qualification
Büşra Cengiz (TUR)	2^{F}
Sandugash Djenbaeva (UZB)	0

Round of 16
Tindra Dalmyr (SWE)	1
Felicitas Domajeva (NOR)	3
Büşra Cengiz (TUR)	0
Darya Ilyasevich (UWW)	4^{F}
Csilla van Os (NED)	2
Carissa Qureshi (USA)	15
Anna Stratan (KAZ)	4
Rixiwangmu (CHN)	4

Quarterfinals
Felicitas Domajeva (NOR)	10
Darya Ilyasevich (UWW)	0
Carissa Qureshi (USA)	2
Anna Stratan (KAZ)	9

Semifinals
Felicitas Domajeva (NOR)	12
Anna Stratan (KAZ)	2

Bottom half

Qualification

Round of 16
Cho Eun-so (KOR)	3
Romaïssa El Kharroubi (FRA)	6
Dolzhon Tsyngueva (UWW)	0
Tapasya Gahlawat (IND)	6^{F}
Anna Köblő (HUN)	0
Sowaka Uchida (JPN)	11
Inna Alimova (LTU)	8^{F}
Agnia Krakovska (CAN)	6

Quarterfinals
Romaïssa El Kharroubi (FRA)	0
Tapasya Gahlawat (IND)	9^{F}
Sowaka Uchida (JPN)	10
Inna Alimova (LTU)	0

Semifinals
Tapasya Gahlawat (IND)	4
Sowaka Uchida (JPN)	3

Repechage round 2
Tindra Dalmyr (SWE)	2^{F}
Darya Ilyasevich (UWW)	3
Dolzhon Tsyngueva (UWW)	12
Romaïssa El Kharroubi (FRA)	1

Bronze medal match
Tindra Dalmyr (SWE)	1
Anna Stratan (KAZ)	9
Dolzhon Tsyngueva (UWW)	WO
Sowaka Uchida (JPN)

=== 59 kg ===
19 and 20 August

Final

Final
Sakura Onishi (JPN)	10
Amelia Samuelsson (SWE)	0

Top half

Qualification
Anel Shokayeva (KAZ)	1
Aubre Krazer (USA)	11
Sevim Akbaş (TUR)	5
Mariia Miziurko (UKR)	7

Round of 16
Marta Hetmanava (UWW)	14
Elena Kurova (UWW)	4
Aubre Krazer (USA)	10
Lkhagvasürengiin Erdenebolor (MGL)	3
Sakura Onishi (JPN)	10
Mariia Miziurko (UKR)	0
Éda Balázs (HUN)	0
Zhu Yifan (CHN)	11^{F}

Quarterfinals
Marta Hetmanava (UWW)	1
Aubre Krazer (USA)	9
Sakura Onishi (JPN)	10
Zhu Yifan (CHN)	0

Semifinals
Aubre Krazer (USA)	0
Sakura Onishi (JPN)	10

Bottom half

Qualification
Mădălina Prisacari (MDA)	7
Rahma Magdy (EGY)	7
Li Kai-yi (TPE)	2
Amelia Samuelsson (SWE)	10

Round of 16
Viktoria Boynova (BUL)	4
Anna Tieliegina (LTU)	10^{F}
Rahma Magdy (EGY)	0
Hiunai Hurbanova (AZE)	6
Rosa Molina (ESP)	2
Amelia Samuelsson (SWE)	4^{F}
Ella Finding (CAN)	WO
~~Neha Sangwan (IND)~~

Quarterfinals
Anna Tieliegina (LTU)	2
Hiunai Hurbanova (AZE)	12
Amelia Samuelsson (SWE)	6^{F}
Ella Finding (CAN)	4

Semifinals
Hiunai Hurbanova (AZE)	7
Amelia Samuelsson (SWE)	8

Repechage round 1
Li Kai-yi (TPE)	2
Rosa Molina (ESP)	7

Repechage round 2
Mariia Miziurko (UKR)	1
Zhu Yifan (CHN)	2^{F}
Rosa Molina (ESP)	0
Ella Finding (CAN)	10

Bronze medal match
Zhu Yifan (CHN)	5
Aubre Krazer (USA)	3
Ella Finding (CAN)	1
Hiunai Hurbanova (AZE)	4

=== 62 kg ===
20 and 21 August

Final

Final
Ruzanna Mammadova (AZE)	6
Yangzhen (CHN)	6

Top half

Qualification
Mairi Mani (GRE)	0
Annika Fines (CAN)	4^{F}

Round of 16
Aidana Shorayeva (KAZ)	0
Ruzanna Mammadova (AZE)	11
Annika Fines (CAN)	0
Nigina Sabirova (UZB)	5^{F}
Anna Karbovska (UKR)	3
Karyna Fishchuk (UWW)	0
Wu Tzu-ling (TPE)	0
Büşra Efe (TUR)	2^{F}

Quarterfinals
Ruzanna Mammadova (AZE)	3
Nigina Sabirova (UZB)	2
Anna Karbovska (UKR)	0
Büşra Efe (TUR)	4^{F}

Semifinals
Ruzanna Mammadova (AZE)	10^{F}
Büşra Efe (TUR)	1

Bottom half

Qualification
Neevis Rodríguez (MEX)	8^{F}
Anjali Gahlawat (IND)	2
Shirin Takemoto (JPN)	12
Haylie Jaffe (USA)	2

Round of 16
Ivena Bliznakova (BUL)	0
Yangzhen (CHN)	4^{F}
Neevis Rodríguez (MEX)	8
Nella Honkaniemi (FIN)	8
Naemi Leistner (GER)	2
Shirin Takemoto (JPN)	4
Ekaterina Radysheva (UWW)	4^{F}
Gabriela Rudoi (MDA)	0

Quarterfinals
Yangzhen (CHN)	10
Neevis Rodríguez (MEX)	0
Shirin Takemoto (JPN)	5
Ekaterina Radysheva (UWW)	2

Semifinals
Yangzhen (CHN)	8
Shirin Takemoto (JPN)	2

Repechage round 2
Aidana Shorayeva (KAZ)	0
Nigina Sabirova (UZB)	6^{F}
Ivena Bliznakova (BUL)	2
Neevis Rodríguez (MEX)	4

Bronze medal match
Nigina Sabirova (UZB)	8
Büşra Efe (TUR)	0
Neevis Rodríguez (MEX)	7
Shirin Takemoto (JPN)	9

=== 65 kg ===
20 and 21 August

Final

Final
Momoko Kitade (JPN)	9
Margarita Salnazarian (UWW)	5

Top half

Qualification
Aliautsina Shkuratava (UWW)	5
Saga Svensson (SWE)	7^{F}
Nyamsürengiin Narkhajid (MGL)	10
Asema Anarkulova (KGZ)	3
Viktória Pupp (HUN)	0
Momoko Kitade (JPN)	10

Round of 16
Daniella Nugent (USA)	12
Mukhayyo Narzilloeva (UZB)	10
Saga Svensson (SWE)	4^{F}
Leonie Steigert (GER)	1
Mansi Bhadana (IND)	1
Nyamsürengiin Narkhajid (MGL)	2
Momoko Kitade (JPN)	3
Beyza Nur Akkuş (TUR)	2

Quarterfinals
Daniella Nugent (USA)	7^{F}
Saga Svensson (SWE)	6
Nyamsürengiin Narkhajid (MGL)	0
Momoko Kitade (JPN)	5

Semifinals
Daniella Nugent (USA)	2
Momoko Kitade (JPN)	12

Bottom half

Qualification
Rui Zaixue (CHN)	7^{F}
Viktória Földešiová (SVK)	1
Chiang Kang-yu (TPE)	0
Nikoleta Barmpa (GRE)	10

Round of 16
Iryna Borysiuk (UKR)	12
Mackenzie Cayer (CAN)	2
Rui Zaixue (CHN)	4
Margarita Salnazarian (UWW)	6
Mawadda Hamdun (EGY)	8^{F}
Nikoleta Barmpa (GRE)	12
Emilija Jakovljević (SRB)	1
Kyzzhibek Zharkynbayeva (KAZ)	1

Quarterfinals
Iryna Borysiuk (UKR)	0
Margarita Salnazarian (UWW)	10
Mawadda Hamdun (EGY)	9^{F}
Kyzzhibek Zharkynbayeva (KAZ)	3

Semifinals
Margarita Salnazarian (UWW)	7^{F}
Mawadda Hamdun (EGY)	6

Repechage round 1
Viktória Pupp (HUN)	0
Beyza Nur Akkuş (TUR)	10

Repechage round 2
Beyza Nur Akkuş (TUR)	4
Nyamsürengiin Narkhajid (MGL)	3
Rui Zaixue (CHN)	7
Iryna Borysiuk (UKR)	8

Bronze medal match
Beyza Nur Akkuş (TUR)	10
Daniella Nugent (USA)	0
Iryna Borysiuk (UKR)	12
Mawadda Hamdun (EGY)	2

=== 68 kg ===
19 and 20 August

Final

Final
Ray Hoshino (JPN)	7
Srishti Janghu (IND)	0

Top half

Qualification
Erdenebatyn Odzayaa (MGL)	10
Song Yeon-woo (KOR)	0
Ayşe Erkan (TUR)	6
Ray Hoshino (JPN)	4^{F}
Lene-Marie McCrackin (CAN)	6^{F}
Liliana Kazmina (UWW)	4

Round of 16
Joseth Mavungu (ANG)	12^{F}
Ilinka Stefanova (BUL)	6
Erdenebatyn Odzayaa (MGL)	11
Qiu Wenjin (CHN)	0
Jordyn Fouse (USA)	2
Ray Hoshino (JPN)	13^{F}
Lene-Marie McCrackin (CAN)	0
Oleksandra Rybak (UKR)	10

Quarterfinals
Joseth Mavungu (ANG)	0
Erdenebatyn Odzayaa (MGL)	10
Ray Hoshino (JPN)	12
Oleksandra Rybak (UKR)	2

Semifinals
Erdenebatyn Odzayaa (MGL)	5
Ray Hoshino (JPN)	4^{F}

Bottom half

Qualification
Srishti Janghu (IND)	10
Eduarda Rodrigues (BRA)	0
Sabina Torey (KAZ)	4^{F}
Michaela Seböková (SVK)	0
Gulnura Tashtanbekova (KGZ)	10
Cai Sheng-fang (TPE)	0
Maja Munk (HUN)	WO
~~Lorena Duraj (KOS)~~

Round of 16
Dominika Pochowska (POL)	0
Srishti Janghu (IND)	8^{F}
Sabina Torey (KAZ)	10
Maša Perović (SRB)	15
Maria Panțîru (ROU)	0
Gulnura Tashtanbekova (KGZ)	10
Maja Munk (HUN)	0
Laura Köhler (GER)	11^{F}

Quarterfinals
Srishti Janghu (IND)	10
Maša Perović (SRB)	0
Gulnura Tashtanbekova (KGZ)	2
Laura Köhler (GER)	5^{F}

Semifinals
Srishti Janghu (IND)	7
Laura Köhler (GER)	3

Repechage round 1
Ayşe Erkan (TUR)	10
Jordyn Fouse (USA)	0
Eduarda Rodrigues (BRA)	10^{F}
Dominika Pochowska (POL)	0

Repechage round 2
Ayşe Erkan (TUR)	7
Oleksandra Rybak (UKR)	18
Eduarda Rodrigues (BRA)	10
Maša Perović (SRB)	0

Bronze medal match
Oleksandra Rybak (UKR)	8
Erdenebatyn Odzayaa (MGL)	9
Eduarda Rodrigues (BRA)	13^{F}
Laura Köhler (GER)	0

=== 72 kg ===
21 and 22 August

Final

Final
Kajal Dhochak (IND)	8
Liu Yuqi (CHN)	6

Top half

Round of 32
Elvira Ersson (SWE)	0
Jasmine Robinson (USA)	12

Round of 16
Meiramgul Maksot (KAZ)	0
Veronika Vilk (CRO)	9^{F}
Jasmine Robinson (USA)	4^{F}
Ai Sakai (JPN)	0
Daria Konstantynova (UKR)	1
Kaiyrkul Sharshebaeva (KGZ)	3
Kajal Dhochak (IND)	15
Emili Apostolova (BUL)	4

Quarterfinals
Veronika Vilk (CRO)	0
Jasmine Robinson (USA)	4^{F}
Kaiyrkul Sharshebaeva (KGZ)	0
Kajal Dhochak (IND)	7

Semifinals
Jasmine Robinson (USA)	6
Kajal Dhochak (IND)	13

Bottom half

Round of 32

Round of 16
Auguste Gendvilaitė (LTU)	0
Kristina Bratchikova (UWW)	4^{F}
Zahra Karimzada (AZE)	0
Liu Yuqi (CHN)	10
Viktoryia Aliseyenka (UWW)	2
Haticenur Sarı (TUR)	10^{F}
Karolina Jaworska (POL)	6
Petra Müller (HUN)	6

Quarterfinals
Kristina Bratchikova (UWW)	0
Liu Yuqi (CHN)	10
Haticenur Sarı (TUR)	10
Petra Müller (HUN)	0

Semifinals
Liu Yuqi (CHN)	13
Haticenur Sarı (TUR)	2

Repechage round 2
Emili Apostolova (BUL)	2
Kaiyrkul Sharshebaeva (KGZ)	12
Zahra Karimzada (AZE)	0
Kristina Bratchikova (UWW)	5^{F}

Bronze medal match
Kaiyrkul Sharshebaeva (KGZ)	WO
Jasmine Robinson (USA)
Kristina Bratchikova (UWW)	17
Haticenur Sarı (TUR)	12

=== 76 kg ===
20 and 21 August

Main bracket

Round of 16
Liu Cancan (CHN)	0
Nadiia Sokolovska (UKR)	4^{F}
Naomi Simon (USA)	9^{F}
Rupinder Johal (CAN)	2
Alina Yertostik (KAZ)	1
Taravyn Tüvshinjargal (MGL)	11
Veronika Nyikos (HUN)	0
Priya Malik (IND)	10
Ayano Moro (JPN)	3
Diana Titova (UWW)	4
Sevinchoy Polvonova (UZB)	6
Aizharkyn Zhanybekova (KGZ)	4

Quarterfinals
Elmira Yasin (TUR)	2
Nadiia Sokolovska (UKR)	5
Naomi Simon (USA)	4
Taravyn Tüvshinjargal (MGL)	10
Priya Malik (IND)	4
Diana Titova (UWW)	0
Sevinchoy Polvonova (UZB)	0
Evelin Ujhelji (SRB)	8^{F}

Semifinals
Nadiia Sokolovska (UKR)	4^{F}
Taravyn Tüvshinjargal (MGL)	0
Priya Malik (IND)	10
Evelin Ujhelji (SRB)	0

Final
Nadiia Sokolovska (UKR)	4^{F}
Priya Malik (IND)	0

Repechage round
Liu Cancan (CHN)	15
Elmira Yasin (TUR)	11
Veronika Nyikos (HUN)	0
Diana Titova (UWW)	7^{F}

Bronze medal match
Liu Cancan (CHN)	6
Taravyn Tüvshinjargal (MGL)	0
Diana Titova (UWW)	WO
Evelin Ujhelji (SRB)

== See also ==
- 2025 U20 World Wrestling Championships – Men's freestyle
- 2025 U20 World Wrestling Championships – Men's Greco-Roman
