= Priya Malik =

Indian freestyle wrestler

Personal information
- National team: India
- Born: Nidani, Haryana, India

Sport
- Sport: Wrestling
- Weight class: 76 kg
- Event: Freestyle
Medal record
Women's freestyle wrestling
Representing India
Asian Championships
Bronze medal – third place	2023 Astana	76kg
Grand Prix
Silver medal – second place	2025 Budapest	76kg
U23 World Championships
Bronze medal – third place	2025 Novi Sad	76kg
U23 Asian Championships
Gold medal – first place	2024 Amman	76kg
Gold medal – first place	2025 Vung Tau	76kg
U20 World Championships
Gold medal – first place	2023 Amman	76kg
Silver medal – second place	2022 Sofia	76kg
Silver medal – second place	2025 Samokov	76kg
U20 Asian Championships
Gold medal – first place	2023 Amman	76kg
Silver medal – second place	2022 Manama	76kg
U17 World Championships
Gold medal – first place	2021 Budapest	73kg
Gold medal – first place	2022 Rome	73kg
U17 Asian Championships
Gold medal – first place	2022 Bishkek	73kg

Priya Malik is an Indian freestyle wrestler.

== Early life ==
Priya Malik was born in Nidani village of Jind district, Haryana. Her father Jayabhagwan Nidani is an Indian army veteran. Her father quit Army in 2017 for help priya in training.
