= Günay Qurbanova =

Azerbaijani freestyle wrestler (born 2006)

Hiunai Hurbanova
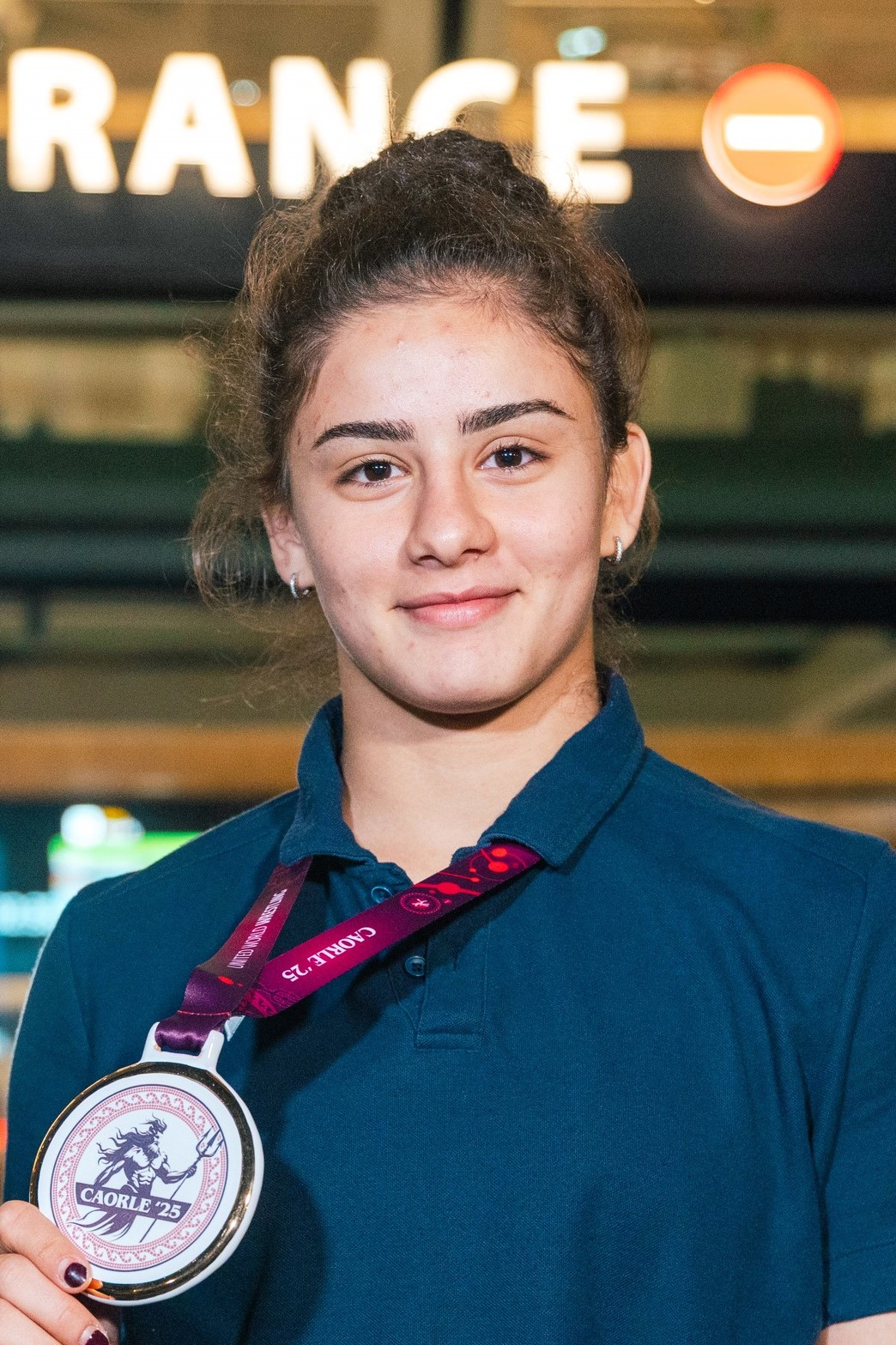

Personal information
- Native name: Hiunai Hurbanova
- Born: 25 October 2007 (age 18) Azerbaijan

Sport
- Country: Azerbaijan
- Sport: Amateur wrestling
- Weight class: 59 kg
- Event: Freestyle
- Club: Neftchi
Medal record
Women's freestyle wrestling
Representing Azerbaijan
European Championships
Bronze medal – third place	2026 Tirana	59 kg
Grand Prix
Gold medal – first place	2025 Zagreb	59 kg
U23 World Championships
Bronze medal – third place	2025 Novi Sad	59 kg
Silver medal – second place	2026 Las Vegas	59 kg
European U23 Championships
Gold medal – first place	2025 Tirana	59 kg
World U20 Championships
Bronze medal – third place	2024 Pontevedra	62 kg
Bronze medal – third place	2025 Samokov	59 kg
Silver medal – second place	2026 Bratislava	59 kg
European U20 Championships
Gold medal – first place	2025 Caorle	62 kg
World U17 Championships
Bronze medal – third place	2024 Amman	61 kg

Hiunai Hurbanova (Azerbaijani: Günay Qurbanova; born 25 October 2007) is an Azerbaijani freestyle wrestler who competes in the 59 kg weight category. She is a gold medalist at the 2025 U23 European Wrestling Championships and has won medals at U17, U20 and U23 World Championships.

== Career ==
Hurbanova won the bronze medal in the women's 61 kg event at the 2024 U17 World Wrestling Championships held in Amman, Jordan.

Later that year, she secured another bronze medal at the 2024 World Junior Wrestling Championships in Pontevedra, Spain, in the 62 kg category.

In early 2025, she captured the gold medal in the 59 kg division at the 2025 Zagreb Open, a United World Wrestling Ranking Series event. She recorded a 6–0 semifinal win over Michaela Beck and defeated Alyona Kolesnik in the final.

Hurbanova followed this by winning the 59 kg gold medal at the 2025 European U23 Wrestling Championships held in Tirana, Albania. In the final, she beat Italy's Aurora Russo by a score of 4–0.

At the 2025 Zagreb Open (Ranking Series) in February, she beat Michaela Beck 6–0 in the semi-final and Alyona Kolesnik 4–2 in the final, with earlier wins such as 5–0 technical superiority over Sofia Macaluso.

On April 23, 2026, at the European Wrestling Championships in Tirana, Gunay Gurbanova (59 kg) defeated Marta Getmanova (UWW) 7:5 in the bronze medal match and won the bronze medal.

== Personal life ==
She is the younger sister of wrestler Leyla Gurbanova.
