= 2025 European U20 Wrestling Championships =

2025 European U20 Championships
- Host city: Caorle, Italy
- Dates: 30 June – 6 July 2025
- Stadium: Palamare Valter Vicentini

Champions
- Freestyle: Georgia
- Greco-Roman: Georgia
- Women: Ukraine

The 2025 European U20 Wrestling Championships is the 35th edition of European Juniors Wrestling Championships of combined events, and it took place from 30 June to 6 July in Caorle, Italy.

== Medal table ==
* Host nation (Italy)

Rank	Nation	Gold	Silver	Bronze	Total
–	United World Wrestling	10	7	13	30
1	Georgia	6	1	7	14
2	Azerbaijan	4	5	4	13
3	Ukraine	3	3	7	13
4	Hungary	2	2	2	6
5	Germany	2	2	1	5
6	Turkey	1	2	4	7
7	Armenia	1	1	2	4
8	Norway	1	0	0	1
9	Sweden	0	3	2	5
10	Italy*	0	2	2	4
11	Poland	0	1	3	4
12	France	0	1	1	2
13	Moldova	0	0	4	4
14	Bulgaria	0	0	2	2
14	Greece	0	0	2	2
16	Austria	0	0	1	1
16	Serbia	0	0	1	1
16	Slovakia	0	0	1	1
Totals (18 entries)		30	30	59	119

== Team ranking ==
Rank	Men's freestyle		Men's Greco-Roman		Women's freestyle	
Rank	Team	Points	Team	Points	Team	Points
1	Georgia	164	Georgia	135	Ukraine	116
2	Azerbaijan	133	Azerbaijan	129	Turkey	108
3	Ukraine	81	Ukraine	129	Hungary	90
4	Armenia	70	Hungary	78	Sweden	69
5	Turkey	61	Armenia	71	Poland	66
6	Moldova	60	Turkey	38	Azerbaijan	56
7	Bulgaria	52	Germany	35	Germany	55
8	Italy	48	Sweden	35	Italy	38
9	France	43	Poland	33	Norway	35
10	Germany	41	Greece	29	Moldova	31

== Medal overview ==
=== Men's freestyle ===
Event	Gold	Silver	Bronze
57 kg	Vasif Baghirov; Azerbaijan	Nika Zangaladze; Georgia	Ion Bulgaru; Moldova
57 kg	Vasif Baghirov; Azerbaijan	Nika Zangaladze; Georgia	Magomed-Saliakh Ozdamirov; United World Wrestling
61 kg	Sargis Begoyan; Armenia	Adlan Saitiev; United World Wrestling	Saba Gambashidze; Georgia
61 kg	Sargis Begoyan; Armenia	Adlan Saitiev; United World Wrestling	Andrii Shokaliuk; Ukraine
65 kg	Amal Dzhandubaev; United World Wrestling	Viktor Borohan; Ukraine	Maxim Dimov; Moldova
65 kg	Amal Dzhandubaev; United World Wrestling	Viktor Borohan; Ukraine	Abdullah Toprak; Turkey
70 kg	Inal Cheldiev; United World Wrestling	Daniele Gubbiotti; Italy	Goga Otinashvili; Georgia
70 kg	Inal Cheldiev; United World Wrestling	Daniele Gubbiotti; Italy	Kaloyan Atanasov; Bulgaria
74 kg	Manuel Wagin; Germany	Raul Caso; Italy	Ismail Khaniev; United World Wrestling
74 kg	Manuel Wagin; Germany	Raul Caso; Italy	Omar Gulmammadov; Azerbaijan
79 kg	Davit Tchetchelashvili; Georgia	Muradkhan Omarov; Azerbaijan	Said Saidulov; United World Wrestling
79 kg	Davit Tchetchelashvili; Georgia	Muradkhan Omarov; Azerbaijan	Mukhammad Inshapiev; Austria
86 kg	Dachi Papinashvili; Georgia	Ahmet Yağan; Turkey	Anton Vyhivskyi; Slovakia
86 kg	Dachi Papinashvili; Georgia	Ahmet Yağan; Turkey	Razmik Yepremyan; Armenia
92 kg	Artur Togoev; United World Wrestling	Musza Arsunkaev; Hungary	Anar Jafarli; Azerbaijan
92 kg	Artur Togoev; United World Wrestling	Musza Arsunkaev; Hungary	Grigoris Saridis; Greece
97 kg	Konstantine Petriashvili; Georgia	Ashab Dadaev; France	Andriyan Valkanov; Bulgaria
97 kg	Konstantine Petriashvili; Georgia	Ashab Dadaev; France	Magomedgadzhi Magomedov; United World Wrestling
125 kg	Inal Gagloev; United World Wrestling	Yusif Dursunov; Azerbaijan	Aleksandre Abramishvili; Georgia
125 kg	Inal Gagloev; United World Wrestling	Yusif Dursunov; Azerbaijan	Levan Lagvilava; France

=== Men's Greco-Roman ===
Event	Gold	Silver	Bronze
55 kg	Ivan Solomin; United World Wrestling	Turan Dashdamirov; Azerbaijan	Koba Karumidze; Georgia
55 kg	Ivan Solomin; United World Wrestling	Turan Dashdamirov; Azerbaijan	Maxim Sarmanov; Moldova
60 kg	Aykhan Javadov; Azerbaijan	Adam Silverin; Sweden	Vakhtang Lolua; Georgia
60 kg	Aykhan Javadov; Azerbaijan	Adam Silverin; Sweden	Maksut Sultanov; Ukraine
63 kg	Igor Punchenko; United World Wrestling	Tural Ahmadov; Azerbaijan	William Ekerot; Sweden
63 kg	Igor Punchenko; United World Wrestling	Tural Ahmadov; Azerbaijan	Bende Olasz; Hungary
67 kg	Mingiian Goriaev; United World Wrestling	Vladislav Pokotylo; Ukraine	Anri Khozrevanidze; Georgia
67 kg	Mingiian Goriaev; United World Wrestling	Vladislav Pokotylo; Ukraine	Faraim Mustafayev; Azerbaijan
72 kg	Aleksandre Rusitashvili; Georgia	Gaspar Terteryan; Armenia	Anatolii Pasnak; Ukraine
72 kg	Aleksandre Rusitashvili; Georgia	Gaspar Terteryan; Armenia	Arionas Kolitsopoulos; Greece
77 kg	Anri Putkaradze; Georgia	Davud Mammadov; Azerbaijan	Samvel Terteryan; Armenia
77 kg	Anri Putkaradze; Georgia	Davud Mammadov; Azerbaijan	Kiryl Valeuski; United World Wrestling
82 kg	Mikhail Shkarin; United World Wrestling	Szabolcs Szinay; Hungary	Kyrylo Shnyrov; Ukraine
82 kg	Mikhail Shkarin; United World Wrestling	Szabolcs Szinay; Hungary	Elmin Aliyev; Azerbaijan
87 kg	Luka Kochalidze; Georgia	Abdurakhman Abdulkadyrov; United World Wrestling	Pavlo Torianyk; Ukraine
87 kg	Luka Kochalidze; Georgia	Abdurakhman Abdulkadyrov; United World Wrestling	Branko Dukić; Serbia
97 kg	Darius Kiefer; Germany	Yehor Yakushenko; Ukraine	Sebastian Warchoł; Poland
97 kg	Darius Kiefer; Germany	Yehor Yakushenko; Ukraine	Saipula Gadzhimagomedov; United World Wrestling
130 kg	László Darabos; Hungary	Ali Iliasov; United World Wrestling	Ivan Yankovskyi; Ukraine
130 kg	László Darabos; Hungary	Ali Iliasov; United World Wrestling	Saba Purtseladze; Georgia

=== Women's freestyle ===
Event	Gold	Silver	Bronze
50 kg	Kseniya Kostsenich; United World Wrestling	Josephine Wrensch; Germany	Violetta Biriukova; United World Wrestling
50 kg	Kseniya Kostsenich; United World Wrestling	Josephine Wrensch; Germany	Laura Fáth; Hungary
53 kg	Anastasiia Polska; Ukraine	Ilona Valchuk; Poland	Angela Casarola; Italy
53 kg	Anastasiia Polska; Ukraine	Ilona Valchuk; Poland	Şevval Çayır; Turkey
55 kg	Gerda Terék; Hungary	Valeryia Mikitsich; United World Wrestling	Fabiana Rinella; Italy
55 kg	Gerda Terék; Hungary	Valeryia Mikitsich; United World Wrestling	Amelia Tomala; Poland
57 kg	Felicitas Domajeva; Norway	Tindra Dalmyr; Sweden	Darya Ilyasevich; United World Wrestling
57 kg	Felicitas Domajeva; Norway	Tindra Dalmyr; Sweden	Dolzhon Tsyngueva; United World Wrestling
59 kg	Hiunai Hurbanova; Azerbaijan	Sevim Akbaş; Turkey	Marta Hetmanava; United World Wrestling
59 kg	Hiunai Hurbanova; Azerbaijan	Sevim Akbaş; Turkey	Elena Kurova; United World Wrestling
62 kg	Ruzanna Mammadova; Azerbaijan	Leonie Steigert; Germany	Gabriela Rudoi; Moldova
62 kg	Ruzanna Mammadova; Azerbaijan	Leonie Steigert; Germany	Ekaterina Radysheva; United World Wrestling
65 kg	Beyza Nur Akkuş; Turkey	Margarita Salnazarian; United World Wrestling	Saga Svensson; Sweden
65 kg	Beyza Nur Akkuş; Turkey	Margarita Salnazarian; United World Wrestling	Iryna Borysiuk; Ukraine
68 kg	Oleksandra Rybak; Ukraine	Zlatoslava Stepanova; United World Wrestling	Laura Köhler; Germany
68 kg	Oleksandra Rybak; Ukraine	Zlatoslava Stepanova; United World Wrestling	Ayşe Erkan; Turkey
72 kg	Alina Shauchuk; United World Wrestling	Elvira Ersson; Sweden	Karolina Jaworska; Poland
72 kg	Alina Shauchuk; United World Wrestling	Elvira Ersson; Sweden	Kristina Bratchikova; United World Wrestling
76 kg	Nadiia Sokolovska; Ukraine	Diana Titova; United World Wrestling	Elmira Yasin; Turkey

== Participating nations ==
534 wrestlers from 37 countries:

1. Albania (3)
2. Armenia (20)
3. Austria (8)
4. Azerbaijan (25)
5. Bosnia and Herzegovina (1)
6. Bulgaria (25)
7. Croatia (7)
8. Czech Republic (10)
9. Denmark (3)
10. Spain (5)
11. Estonia (12)
12. Finland (8)
13. France (12)
14. United Kingdom (1)
15. Georgia (20)
16. Germany (22)
17. Greece (15)
18. Hungary (29)
19. Ireland (2)
20. Israel (2)
21. Italy (29) (Host)
22. Kosovo (3)
23. Latvia (2)
24. Lithuania (9)
25. Moldova (24)
26. North Macedonia (7)
27. Netherlands (3)
28. Norway (9)
29. Poland (28)
30. Romania (16)
31. Serbia (13)
32. Switzerland (6)
33. Slovakia (8)
34. Slovenia (1)
35. Sweden (12)
36. Turkey (30)
37. Ukraine (30)
38. United World Wrestling (59)
