= Georgi Ivanov (wrestler, born 2002) =

Bulgarian freestyle wrestler

Personal information
- Native name: Георги Иванов
- Full name: Georgi Lyubomirov Ivanov
- Born: 17 July 2002 (age 24) Kardzhali, Bulgaria
- Height: 180 cm (5 ft 11 in)
- Weight: 125 kg (276 lb; 19.7 st)

Sport
- Country: Bulgaria
- Sport: Amateur wrestling
- Weight class: 125 kg
- Event: Freestyle
- Club: Dimitrovgrad Wrestling Club
Medal record
Men's freestyle wrestling
Representing Bulgaria
Dan Kolov - Nikola Petrov Tournament
Gold medal – first place	2024 Sofia	125 kg
Silver medal – second place	2025 Varna	125 kg
Yasar Dogu Tournament
Bronze medal – third place	2025 Kocaeli	125 kg
Grand Prix
Silver medal – second place	2022 Strumica	125 kg
Bronze medal – third place	2023 Bucharest	125 kg
Bronze medal – third place	2023 Erevan	125 kg
European U23 Championships
Gold medal – first place	2023 Bucharest	125 kg
Gold medal – first place	2025 Tirana	125 kg
European U20 Championships
Bronze medal – third place	2022 Rome	125 kg
European U17 Championships
Silver medal – second place	2019 Faenza	110 kg

Georgi Ivanov (Bulgarian: Георги Иванов; born 17 July 2002) is a Bulgarian freestyle wrestler.

== Career ==
Georgi Ivanov began gaining international recognition at the cadet level, winning the silver medal in the 110 kg category at the 2019 European Cadets Wrestling Championships held in Faenza, Italy.

In 2022, he earned a bronze medal at the European U20 Championships in Rome, competing in the 125 kg freestyle category. The same year, he represented Bulgaria at the 2022 U20 World Wrestling Championships in Sofia, where he defeated Japan's Ryusei Fujita in the qualification round but lost to Nicholas Feldman of the United States in the quarter-finals. He secured another bronze medal through repechage.

Ivanov transitioned successfully to the U23 level, capturing the gold medal at the 2023 European U23 Wrestling Championships held in Bucharest. He achieved dominant wins over Azamat Khosonov (Russia), Efe Anıl (Turkey), and Volodymyr Kochanov (Ukraine) in the final by technical superiority (10–0).

Later in 2023, he competed at the Senior European Wrestling Championships in Zagreb, where he defeated Alexandr Romanov (Moldova) in the qualification round (8–1) but lost in the quarter-finals to Daniel Ligeti (Hungary) by points (1–8), finishing in the top eight.

In 2024, Ivanov participated in the Dan Kolov & Nikola Petrov Tournament in Sofia, where he won the gold medal in the 125 kg category, further establishing himself among Bulgaria's top heavyweights.

The following year, in 2025, he claimed silver at the same tournament held in Varna, losing in the final but outperforming many international contenders.

His most notable achievement in 2025 was at the European U23 Wrestling Championships in Tirana, Albania. He won all of his matches convincingly, including a technical fall victory over Volodymyr Kochanov in the final (11–0), securing his second continental U23 title.

Ivanov also represented Bulgaria at the 2025 Yaşar Doğu Tournament in Kocaeli, Turkey, where he won a bronze medal in the men's freestyle 125 kg category after defeating athletes from Kazakhstan and Turkey in repechage rounds.
