= 2025 European U23 Wrestling Championships – Women's freestyle =

The women's freestyle competitions at the 2025 European U23 Wrestling Championships were held in Tirana, Albania between 10 and 12 March 2025.

== Women's freestyle ==
Legend

- F — Won by fall

=== Women's freestyle 50 kg ===
11 March

Main bracket

Round of 16
Ana Maria Pîrvu (ROU)	2
Natalia Walczak (POL)	3
Vestina Danisevičiūtė (LTU)	1
Svenja Jungo (SUI)	12

Quarterfinals
Viktoriia Slobodeniuk (UKR)	4
Natalia Walczak (POL)	11^{F}
María Cazalla (ESP)	0
Natalia Pudova (UWW)	8^{F}
Songül Kavak (TUR)	4
Anastasiya Yanotava (UWW)	14
Svenja Jungo (SUI)	0
Asmar Jankurtaran (AZE)	3

Semifinals
Natalia Walczak (POL)	0
Natalia Pudova (UWW)	11
Anastasiya Yanotava (UWW)	8^{F}
Asmar Jankurtaran (AZE)	0

Final
Natalia Pudova (UWW)	7
Anastasiya Yanotava (UWW)	5

Bronze medals
María Cazalla (ESP)	0
Natalia Walczak (POL)	12
Songül Kavak (TUR)	3
Asmar Jankurtaran (AZE)	9

=== Women's freestyle 53 kg ===
12 March

Main bracket

Round of 16
Anastasiia Lebedieva (POL)	1
Ana Rotaru (ROU)	3
Laura Stanelytė (LTU)	1
Nataliia Klivchutska (UKR)	10^{F}
Viktoriya Volk (UWW)	1
Ekaterina Karpushkina (UWW)	4^{F}

Quarterfinals
Carla Jaume (ESP)	6
Ana Rotaru (ROU)	0
Elnura Mammadova (AZE)	11
Maria Ferone (ITA)	0
Ellen Östman (SWE)	1
Nataliia Klivchutska (UKR)	3
Ekaterina Karpushkina (UWW)	10
Remziye Karadağ (TUR)	8

Semifinals
Carla Jaume (ESP)	0
Elnura Mammadova (AZE)	12
Nataliia Klivchutska (UKR)	2
Ekaterina Karpushkina (UWW)	3

Final
Elnura Mammadova (AZE)	3
Ekaterina Karpushkina (UWW)	0

Repechage round
Viktoriya Volk (UWW)	5
Remziye Karadağ (TUR)	0

Bronze medal match
Maria Ferone (ITA)	4
Carla Jaume (ESP)	5
Viktoriya Volk (UWW)	5^{F}
Nataliia Klivchutska (UKR)	1

=== Women's freestyle 55 kg ===
11 March

Main bracket

Round of 16
Albina Rillia (UKR)	3
Róza Szenttamási (HUN)	7
Valeryia Mikitsich (UWW)	3
Amory Andrich (GER)	6

Quarterfinals
Mihaela Samoil (MDA)	2^{F}
Róza Szenttamási (HUN)	1
Irena Binkova (BUL)	8
Anastasiia Iandushkina (UWW)	12
Tuba Demir (TUR)	10
Kamila Kasprów (POL)	0
Amory Andrich (GER)	4^{F}
Nargiz Samadova (AZE)	0

Semifinals
Mihaela Samoil (MDA)	10^{F}
Anastasiia Iandushkina (UWW)	4
Tuba Demir (TUR)	11
Amory Andrich (GER)	6

Final
Mihaela Samoil (MDA)	0
Tuba Demir (TUR)	7

Bronze medals
Róza Szenttamási (HUN)	6
Anastasiia Iandushkina (ANA)	0
Kamila Kasprów (POL)	0
Amory Andrich (GER)	12^{F}

=== Women's freestyle 57 kg ===
12 March

Main bracket

Round of 16
Gerda Terék (HUN)	1
Alina Filipovych (UKR)	4
Patrycja Strzelczyk (POL)	2
Georgiana Lircă (ROU)	8
Emine Çakmak (TUR)	1
Aryna Martynava (UWW)	10^{F}

Quarterfinals
Fatme Shaban (BUL)	0
Alina Filipovych (UKR)	10
Milica Sekulović (SRB)	4
Inna Alimova (LTU)	14
Anastasia Kozlova (UWW)	2
Georgiana Lircă (ROU)	5
Aryna Martynava (UWW)	10
Gultakin Shirinova (AZE)	2

Semifinals
Alina Filipovych (UKR)	12
Inna Alimova (LTU)	1
Georgiana Lircă (ROU)	3
Aryna Martynava (UWW)	5

Final
Alina Filipovych (UKR)	2
Aryna Martynava (UWW)	8

Repechage round
Gerda Terék (HUN)	11
Fatme Shaban (BUL)	0
Emine Çakmak (TUR)	5
Gultakin Shirinova (AZE)	7

Bronze medal match
Gerda Terék (HUN)	10
Inna Alimova (LTU)	0
Gultakin Shirinova (AZE)	2
Georgiana Lircă (ROU)	9

=== Women's freestyle 59 kg ===
11 March

Main bracket

Round of 16
Ana Maria Puiu (ROU)	7
Anna Michalcová (CZE)	2
Aurora Russo (ITA)	8
Jana Petrović (SRB)	0
Evgeniia Ogorodnikova (UWW)	12^{F}
Desislava Ivanova (BUL)	4

Quarterfinals
Yuliia Pakhniuk (UKR)	8^{F}
Ana Maria Puiu (ROU)	2
Hiunai Hurbanova (AZE)	7
Marta Hetmanava (UWW)	2
Ebru Dağbaşı (TUR)	0
Aurora Russo (ITA)	4
Evgeniia Ogorodnikova (UWW)	10
Julia Nowicka (POL)	9

Semifinals
Yuliia Pakhniuk (UKR)	1
Hiunai Hurbanova (AZE)	11
Aurora Russo (ITA)	4^{F}
Evgeniia Ogorodnikova (UWW)	0

Final
Hiunai Hurbanova (AZE)	4
Aurora Russo (ITA)	0

Repechage round
Jana Petrović (SRB)	2
Ebru Dağbaşı (TUR)	9

Bronze medal match
Marta Hetmanava (UWW)	14
Yuliia Pakhniuk (UKR)	6
Ebru Dağbaşı (TUR)	4
Evgeniia Ogorodnikova (UWW)	3

=== Women's freestyle 62 kg ===
12 March

Main bracket

Round of 16
Immacolata Danise (ITA)	WO
~~Anna Fotiadou (GRE)~~
Annatina Lippuner (SUI)	3
Naemi Leistner (GER)	6
Alesia Hetmanava (UWW)	2
Iryna Bondar (UKR)	13
Amina Tandelova (UWW)	4^{F}
Ineta Dantaitė (LTU)	0
Selvi İlyasoğlu (TUR)	10
Jovana Radivojević (SRB)	0
Iris Thiébaux (FRA)	7
Yasmine Soliman (HUN)	1

Quarterfinals
Alicja Nowosad (POL)	9^{F}
Immacolata Danise (ITA)	2
Naemi Leistner (GER)	0
Iryna Bondar (UKR)	10
Amina Tandelova (UWW)	2^{F}
Selvi İlyasoğlu (TUR)	2
Iris Thiébaux (FRA)	3
Birgul Soltanova (AZE)	1

Semifinals
Alicja Nowosad (POL)	0
Iryna Bondar (UKR)	5^{F}
Amina Tandelova (UWW)	10
Iris Thiébaux (FRA)	0

Final
Iryna Bondar (UKR)	8
Amina Tandelova (ANA)	4

Repechage round
Alesia Hetmanava (UWW)	10
Naemi Leistner (GER)	0
Ineta Dantaitė (LTU)	0
Selvi İlyasoğlu (TUR)	11

Bronze medal match
Alesia Hetmanava (UWW)	6
Alicja Nowosad (POL)	7
Selvi İlyasoğlu (TUR)	5
Iris Thiébaux (FRA)	3

=== Women's freestyle 65 kg ===
12 March

Main bracket

Round of 16
Bianca Contrafatto (ITA)	5
Emilija Jakovljević (SRB)	2
Olha Padoshyk (POL)	3
Ruzanna Mammadova (AZE)	6
Oleksandra Rybak (UKR)	7
Kseniya Tsiarenia (UWW)	7

Quarterfinals
Viorica Adam (ROU)	3^{F}
Bianca Contrafatto (ITA)	1
Luisa Scheel (GER)	0
Enikő Elekes (HUN)	8^{F}
Ekaterina Koshkina (UWW)	6
Ruzanna Mammadova (AZE)	8
Kseniya Tsiarenia (UWW)	9
Beyza Nur Akkuş (TUR)	3

Semifinals
Viorica Adam (ROU)	0
Enikő Elekes (HUN)	10
Ruzanna Mammadova (AZE)	1
Kseniya Tsiarenia (UWW)}	3

Final
Enikő Elekes (HUN)	2
Kseniya Tsiarenia (UWW)	4^{F}

Repechage round
Oleksandra Rybak (UKR)	4^{F}
Beyza Nur Akkuş (TUR)	2

Bronze medal match
Luisa Scheel (GER)	4
Viorica Adam (ROU)	0
Oleksandra Rybak (UKR)	8
Ruzanna Mammadova (AZE)	2

=== Women's freestyle 68 kg ===
11 March

Main bracket

Round of 16
Olesia Bezuglova (UWW)	9
Sophia Schäfle (GER)	3
Karolina Domaszuk (POL)	10
Nikoleta Barmpa (GRE)	8
Maria Panțîru (ROU)	8
Karolina Pók (HUN)	5

Quarterfinals
Viktoryia Radzkova (UWW)	11
Olesia Bezuglova (UWW)	0
Nesrin Baş (TUR)	10
Laura Godino (ITA)	0
Manola Skobelska (UKR)	7
Karolina Domaszuk (POL)	0
Maria Panțîru (ROU)	6^{F}
Maša Perović (SRB)	0

Semifinals
Viktoryia Radzkova (UWW)	0
Nesrin Baş (TUR)	6^{F}
Manola Skobelska (UKR)	10
Maria Panțîru (ROU)	0

Final
Nesrin Baş (TUR)	6
Manola Skobelska (UKR)	2

Bronze medals
Laura Godin (ITA)	2
Viktoryia Radzkova (UWW)	3
Karolina Domaszuk (POL)	7^{F}
Maria Panțîru (ROU)	3

=== Women's freestyle 72 kg ===
12 March

Main bracket

Round of 16
Iryna Zablotska (UKR)	2
Noémi Osváth-Nagy (HUN)	3

Quarterfinals
Jennifer Rösler (GER)	5
Noémi Osváth-Nagy (HUN)	8
Daniela Tkachuk (POL)	15
Haticenur Sarı (TUR)	4
Paula Rotaru (ROU)	2
Kristina Bratchikova (UWW)	8^{F}
Vincenzo Amendola (ITA)	0
Veronika Vilk (CRO)	9^{F}

Semifinals
Noémi Osváth-Nagy (HUN)	4
Daniela Tkachuk (POL)	4^{F}
Kristina Bratchikova (UWW)	8
Veronika Vilk (CRO)	4

Final
Daniela Tkachuk (POL)	3
Kristina Bratchikova (UWW)	4

Bronze medals
Haticenur Sarı (TUR)	6
Noémi Osváth-Nagy (HUN)	6
Paula Rotaru (ROU)	2
Veronika Vilk (CRO)	13

=== Women's freestyle 76 kg ===
11 March

Main bracket

Round of 16
Hanna Pirskaya (UWW)	9
Olga Kozyreva (UWW)	16^{F}
Elmira Yasin (TUR)	7
Vanesa Georgieva (BUL)	6

Quarterfinals
Evelin Ujhelji (SRB)	7
Olga Kozyreva (UWW)	19
Laura Kühn (GER)	3
Patrycja Cuber (POL)	0
Elvira Braun (SWE)	3
Veronika Nyikos (HUN)	13
Elmira Yasin (TUR)	4
Mariia Orlevych (UKR)	2

Semifinals
Olga Kozyreva (UWW)	7^{F}
Laura Kühn (GER)	5
Veronika Nyikos (HUN)	1
Elmira Yasin (TUR)	6

Final
Olga Kozyreva (UWW)	5
Elmira Yasin (TUR)	10

Repechage round
Hanna Pirskaya (UWW)	10
Evelin Ujhelji (SRB)	0
Vanesa Georgieva (BUL)	1
Mariia Orlevych (UKR)	12

Bronze medal match
Hanna Pirskaya (UWW)	5
Laura Kühn (GER)	4
Mariia Orlevych (UKR)	6^{F}
Veronika Nyikos (HUN)	0
