= 2024 U23 World Wrestling Championships – Women's freestyle 50 kg =

Wrestling competitions

Women's freestyle 50 kg at the 2024 U23 World Championships
- Venue: Tirana Olympic Park
- Dates: 23–24 October
- Competitors: 20 from 18 nations

Medalists
gold medal	Sage Mortimer	United States
silver medal	Natalia Pudova	Authorised Neutral Athletes
bronze medal	Umi Ito	Japan
bronze medal	Nataliia Klivchutska	Ukraine

The women's freestyle 50 is a competition featured at the 2024 U23 World Wrestling Championships, and was held in Tirana, Albania on 23 and 24 October 2024.

This freestyle wrestling competition consists of a single-elimination tournament, with a repechage used to determine the winner of two bronze medals. The two finalists face off for gold and silver medals. Each wrestler who loses to one of the two finalists moves into the repechage, culminating in a pair of bronze medal matches featuring the semifinal losers each facing the remaining repechage opponent from their half of the bracket.

== Results ==
Legend

- F — Won by fall

=== Final ===
Final
Sage Mortimer (USA)	7
Natalia Pudova (AIN)	5

=== Top half ===
Round of 32
Zehra Demirhan (TUR)	4^{F}
Zineb Ech-Chabki (MAR)	0
Svenja Jungo (SUI)	2
Umi Ito (JPN)	12^{F}

Round of 16
Sage Mortimer (USA)	11
Khrystyna Basych (SVK)	0
Zehra Demirhan (TUR)	4
Laura Ganikyzy (KAZ)	6
Elnura Mammadova (AZE)	2
Umi Ito (JPN)	12
Komal Panchal (IND)	7
Kelyn Young (CAN)	0

Quarterfinals
Sage Mortimer (USA)	14
Laura Ganikyzy (KAZ)	4
Umi Ito (JPN)	2^{F}
Komal Panchal (IND)	0

Semifinals
Sage Mortimer (USA)	4^{F}
Umi Ito (JPN)	12

=== Bottom half ===
Round of 32
Natalia Walczak (POL)	0
Deng Linjie (CHN)	8^{F}
Vestina Danisevičiūtė (LTU)	2
Mönkhbatyn Mönkhgerel (MGL)	6^{F}

Round of 16
Ana Maria Pîrvu (ROU)	7
Natallia Varakina (AIN)	9
Deng Linjie (CHN)	11
Lin Yi-hui (TPE)	4
Nataliia Klivchutska (UKR)	5
Mönkhbatyn Mönkhgerel (MGL)	3
Yusneiry Agrazal (PAN)	0
Natalia Pudova (AIN)	12^{F}

Quarterfinals
Natallia Varakina (AIN)	12
Deng Linjie (CHN)	1
Nataliia Klivchutska (UKR)	4
Natalia Pudova (AIN)	6

Semifinals
Natallia Varakina (AIN)	2
Natalia Pudova (AIN)	8

=== Repechage ===
Repechage round 2
Khrystyna Basych (SVK)	4
Laura Ganikyzy (KAZ)	5
Yusneiry Agrazal (PAN)	0
Nataliia Klivchutska (UKR)	6^{F}

Bronze medals
Laura Ganikyzy (KAZ)	0
Umi Ito (JPN)	11
Nataliia Klivchutska (UKR)	9
Natallia Varakina (AIN)	1

== Final standing ==
Rank	Athlete
1st place, gold medalist(s)	Sage Mortimer (USA)
2nd place, silver medalist(s)	Natalia Pudova (AIN)
3rd place, bronze medalist(s)	Umi Ito (JPN)
3rd place, bronze medalist(s)	Nataliia Klivchutska (UKR)
5	Laura Ganikyzy (KAZ)
5	Natallia Varakina (AIN)
7	Deng Linjie (CHN)
8	Mönkhbatyn Mönkhgerel (MGL)
9	Zehra Demirhan (TUR)
10	Komal Panchal (IND)
11	Ana Maria Pîrvu (ROU)
12	Lin Yi-hui (TPE)
13	Khrystyna Basych (SVK)
14	Elnura Mammadova (AZE)
15	Vestina Danisevičiūtė (LTU)
16	Svenja Jungo (SUI)
17	Zineb Ech-Chabki (MAR)
18	Kelyn Young (CAN)
19	Natalia Walczak (POL)
20	Yusneiry Agrazal (PAN)
