= 2021 European Juniors Wrestling Championships =

- Host city: Dortmund, Germany
- Dates: 28 June – 4 July 2021

Champions
- Freestyle: Russia
- Greco-Roman: Georgia
- Women: Ukraine

The 2021 European Juniors Wrestling Championships was held in Dortmund, Germany between 28 June to 4 July 2021.

== Medal table ==
Rank	Nation	Gold	Silver	Bronze	Total
1	Russia	10	3	8	21
2	Ukraine	7	5	4	16
3	Azerbaijan	4	2	2	8
4	Turkey	3	2	7	12
5	Georgia	3	2	4	9
6	Armenia	1	2	3	6
6	Moldova	1	2	3	6
8	Denmark	1	0	0	1
9	Germany	0	4	4	8
10	Hungary	0	4	2	6
11	Poland	0	2	2	4
12	Greece	0	1	0	1
12	Slovakia	0	1	0	1
14	Belarus	0	0	4	4
15	Norway	0	0	3	3
16	Bulgaria	0	0	2	2
16	Romania	0	0	2	2
16	Sweden	0	0	2	2
19	Belgium	0	0	1	1
19	Croatia	0	0	1	1
19	Czech Republic	0	0	1	1
19	Estonia	0	0	1	1
19	Finland	0	0	1	1
19	France	0	0	1	1
19	Netherlands	0	0	1	1
19	Switzerland	0	0	1	1
Totals (26 entries)		30	30	60	120

== Team ranking ==
Rank	Men's freestyle		Men's Greco-Roman		Women's freestyle	
Rank	Team	Points	Team	Points	Team	Points
1	Russia	185	Georgia	154	Ukraine	230
2	Turkey	126	Russia	118	Russia	155
3	Azerbaijan	119	Turkey	100	Turkey	110
4	Ukraine	103	Azerbaijan	99	Hungary	100
5	Armenia	101	Hungary	71	Poland	97

== Medal summary ==
=== Men's freestyle ===
Event	Gold	Silver	Bronze
57 kg	(Russia) Said Khunkerov	(Armenia) Manvel Khndzrtsyan	(Georgia (country)) Giorgi Gegelashvili
57 kg	(Russia) Said Khunkerov	(Armenia) Manvel Khndzrtsyan	(Switzerland) Thomas Epp
61 kg	(Azerbaijan) Kanan Heybatov	(Armenia) Levik Mikayelyan	(Georgia (country)) Davit Abdaladze
61 kg	(Azerbaijan) Kanan Heybatov	(Armenia) Levik Mikayelyan	(Moldova) Pavel Andrusca
65 kg	(Russia) Turpal Ali Khatuev	(Ukraine) Mykyta Honcharov	(Georgia (country)) Giorgi Tcholadze
65 kg	(Russia) Turpal Ali Khatuev	(Ukraine) Mykyta Honcharov	(Belgium) Ayub Muratovitch Musaev
70 kg	(Azerbaijan) Turan Bayramov	(Moldova) Stanislav Novac	(Armenia) Narek Harutyunyan
70 kg	(Azerbaijan) Turan Bayramov	(Moldova) Stanislav Novac	(Turkey) Mevlüt Özdemir
74 kg	(Azerbaijan) Dzhabrail Gadzhiev	(Turkey) Taner Garip	(Russia) Magomed Abdulkadyrov
74 kg	(Azerbaijan) Dzhabrail Gadzhiev	(Turkey) Taner Garip	(Germany) Stas David Wolf
79 kg	(Russia) Magomedrasul Asluev	(Greece) Georgios Kougioumtsidis	(Turkey) İsmail Küçüksolak
79 kg	(Russia) Magomedrasul Asluev	(Greece) Georgios Kougioumtsidis	(Germany) Richard Schroeder
86 kg	(Russia) Arslan Bagaev	(Germany) Joshua Morodion	(France) Rakhim Magamadov
86 kg	(Russia) Arslan Bagaev	(Germany) Joshua Morodion	(Turkey) Emre Çiftçi
92 kg	(Russia) Islam Kuchukov	(Germany) Johannes Mayer	(Armenia) Sergey Sargsyan
92 kg	(Russia) Islam Kuchukov	(Germany) Johannes Mayer	(Ukraine) Daniil Pidlypenets
97 kg	(Turkey) Polat Polatçı	(Russia) Ali Magomedovich Aliev	(Ukraine) Danylo Stasiuk
97 kg	(Turkey) Polat Polatçı	(Russia) Ali Magomedovich Aliev	(Hungary) Milan Andras Korcsog
125 kg	(Armenia) Lyova Gevorgyan	(Azerbaijan) Aydin Ahmadov	(Russia) Arsamag Zasseev
125 kg	(Armenia) Lyova Gevorgyan	(Azerbaijan) Aydin Ahmadov	(Ukraine) Vasyl Sova

=== Men's Greco-Roman ===
Event	Gold	Silver	Bronze
55 kg	(Russia) Pavel Belkin	(Georgia (country)) Giorgi Tokhadze	(Bulgaria) Denis Demirov
55 kg	(Russia) Pavel Belkin	(Georgia (country)) Giorgi Tokhadze	(Romania) Denis Mihai
60 kg	(Georgia (country)) Pridon Abuladze	(Russia) Dinislam Bammatov	(Azerbaijan) Nihat Mammadli
60 kg	(Georgia (country)) Pridon Abuladze	(Russia) Dinislam Bammatov	(Bulgaria) Edmond Nazaryan
63 kg	(Georgia (country)) Diego Chkhikvadze	(Azerbaijan) Gurban Gurbanov	(Moldova) Corneliu Rusu
63 kg	(Georgia (country)) Diego Chkhikvadze	(Azerbaijan) Gurban Gurbanov	(Sweden) Niklas Oehlen
67 kg	(Azerbaijan) Hasrat Jafarov	(Turkey) Serhat Kırık	(Armenia) Shant Khachatryan
67 kg	(Azerbaijan) Hasrat Jafarov	(Turkey) Serhat Kırık	(Georgia (country)) Luka Ochigava
72 kg	(Georgia (country)) Giorgi Chkhikvadze	(Hungary) Attila Toesmagi	(Azerbaijan) Khasay Hasanlı
72 kg	(Georgia (country)) Giorgi Chkhikvadze	(Hungary) Attila Toesmagi	(Germany) Samuel Bellscheidt
77 kg	(Moldova) Alexandrin Gutu	(Georgia (country)) Giorgi Shpetishvili	(Norway) Exauce Mukubu
77 kg	(Moldova) Alexandrin Gutu	(Georgia (country)) Giorgi Shpetishvili	(Finland) Jonni Sarkkinen
82 kg	(Russia) Amirkhan Tsechoev	(Ukraine) Mykyta Alieksieiev	(Netherlands) Marcel Sterkenburg
82 kg	(Russia) Amirkhan Tsechoev	(Ukraine) Mykyta Alieksieiev	(Turkey) Samet Yaldıran
87 kg	(Denmark) Turpal Bisultanov	(Moldova) Gabriel Lupasco	(Sweden) Algot Kaelman
87 kg	(Denmark) Turpal Bisultanov	(Moldova) Gabriel Lupasco	(Russia) Mukhammad Evloev
97 kg	(Russia) Aleksei Mileshin	(Germany) Anton Vieweg	(Norway) Marcus Worren
97 kg	(Russia) Aleksei Mileshin	(Germany) Anton Vieweg	(Belarus) Pavel Hlinchuk
130 kg	(Turkey) Hamza Bakır	(Ukraine) Mykhailo Vyshnyvetskyi	(Poland) Tomasz Wawrzynczyk
130 kg	(Turkey) Hamza Bakır	(Ukraine) Mykhailo Vyshnyvetskyi	(Hungary) Adolf Bazso

=== Women's freestyle ===
Event	Gold	Silver	Bronze
50 kg	(Russia) Polina Lukina	(Ukraine) Liliia Malanchuk	(Romania) Georgiana Antuca
50 kg	(Russia) Polina Lukina	(Ukraine) Liliia Malanchuk	(Turkey) Zehra Demirhan
53 kg	(Ukraine) Nataliia Klivchutska	(Russia) Venera Nafikova	(Moldova) Mihaela Samoil
53 kg	(Ukraine) Nataliia Klivchutska	(Russia) Venera Nafikova	(Germany) Anastasia Blayvas
55 kg	(Ukraine) Oleksandra Khomenets	(Hungary) Roza Szenttamasi	(Russia) Anastasiia Iandushkina
55 kg	(Ukraine) Oleksandra Khomenets	(Hungary) Roza Szenttamasi	(Turkey) Melda Dernekçi
57 kg	(Ukraine) Solomiia Vynnyk	(Poland) Patrycja Strzelczyk	(Russia) Anastasia Kozlova
57 kg	(Ukraine) Solomiia Vynnyk	(Poland) Patrycja Strzelczyk	(Czech Republic) Anna Michalcová
59 kg	(Ukraine) Yulia Leskovets	(Hungary) Anna Szél	(Russia) Anastasiia Sidelnikova
59 kg	(Ukraine) Yulia Leskovets	(Hungary) Anna Szél	(Poland) Aleksandra Witos
62 kg	(Russia) Alina Kasabieva	(Ukraine) Kateryna Zelenykh	(Croatia) Iva Gerić
62 kg	(Russia) Alina Kasabieva	(Ukraine) Kateryna Zelenykh	(Norway) Viktoria Oeverby
65 kg	(Ukraine) Manola Skobelska	(Hungary) Noémi Szabados	(Belarus) Alina Maksimava
65 kg	(Ukraine) Manola Skobelska	(Hungary) Noémi Szabados	(Estonia) Viktoria Vesso
68 kg	(Ukraine) Oksana Chudyk	(Germany) Sophia Schafle	(Belarus) Alina Miklasheuskaya
68 kg	(Ukraine) Oksana Chudyk	(Germany) Sophia Schafle	(Russia) Elizaveta Petliakova
72 kg	(Ukraine) Anastasiya Alpyeyeva	(Slovakia) Zsuzsanna Molnár	(Turkey) Nazar Batır
72 kg	(Ukraine) Anastasiya Alpyeyeva	(Slovakia) Zsuzsanna Molnár	(Russia) Mariam Guseinova
76 kg	(Turkey) Melisa Sarıtaç	(Poland) Daniela Tkachuk	(Belarus) Kseniya Dzibuk
76 kg	(Turkey) Melisa Sarıtaç	(Poland) Daniela Tkachuk	(Ukraine) Mariia Orlevych

Preceded by 2019 Pontevedra	European Juniors Wrestling Championships; 2021	Succeeded by 2022 Rome
