= Besir Alili =

Macedonian freestyle wrestler

Personal information
- Nationality: North Macedonia
- Born: April 16, 2003 (age 23) Skopje, North Macedonia

Sport
- Sport: Amateur wrestling
- Event: Freestyle wrestling
Medal record
Men's freestyle wrestling
Representing North Macedonia
European Cadet Wrestling Championships
Gold medal – first place	2019 Faenza	48 kg
Silver medal – second place	2018 Skopje	45 kg
Dan Kolov & Nikola Petrov Tournament
Bronze medal – third place	2023 Sofia	57 kg

Besir Alili (born in Skopje, North Macedonia) is a Macedonian freestyle wrestler of Albanian descent. He won the gold medal in the 48 kg event at the 2019 Cadet European Wrestling Championships held in Faenza, Italy, which was the first ever cadet European title for North Macedonia in wrestling.

== Career ==
He won the gold medal in the 48 kg event at the 2019 Cadet European Wrestling Championships held in Faenza, Italy, which was the first ever cadet European title for North Macedonia in wrestling history.

In 2023, Alili competed in the 61 kg category at the 2023 U20 World Wrestling Championships in Amman, Jordan, where he finished in fifth place.

In May 2024, he entered the 65 kg category at the 2024 World Olympic Qualification Tournament in Istanbul, Turkey, where he was eliminated in the opening round by Ahmet Duman of Turkey and did not secure a quota place for the 2024 Summer Olympics in Paris.

Later that year, he returned to the 61 kg weight class for the 2024 World Wrestling Championships (non-Olympic weight categories) held in Tirana, Albania. He lost his first-round match to Reza Hossein Momenijoujadeh of Iran and finished 24th overall.

At the 2025 U23 European Wrestling Championships in Tirana, he reached the semifinals in the 61 kg division but lost the bronze medal match to Tolga Özbek of Turkey, finishing fifth.

The following month, he competed in the same weight category at the 2025 European Wrestling Championships in Bratislava, Slovakia, where an opening-round loss to Andrii Dzhelep of Ukraine left him in 12th place overall.
