= 2023 World Cadet Wrestling Championships – Women's freestyle =

The women's freestyle competitions at the 2023 World Cadet Wrestling Championships were held in Istanbul, Turkey between 2 and 4 August 2023.

== Women's freestyle ==
=== Women's freestyle 43 kg ===
2 August

Legend

- F — Won by fall

Round of 16
Mona Ezaka (JPN) | 6^{F}
Aleksandra Berezovskaia (ANA) | 0
Diana Voiculescu (ROU) | 0
Maria Gkika (GRE) | 3
Nilufar Nurmukhammadova (UZB) | 10
Kinga Jaroniek (POL) | 0
Morgan Nicole Turner (USA) | 10
Saadat Guliyeva (AZE) | 0

Quarterfinals
Parveen (IND) | 0
Mona Ezaka (JPN) | 2^{F}
Maria Gkika (GRE) | 3
Madina Kuanyshbek (KAZ) | 1
Yağmur Karabacak (TUR) | 2
Nilufar Nurmukhammadova (UZB) | 8^{F}
Morgan Nicole Turner (USA) | 10
Alina Mazharouskaya (ANA) | 0

Semifinals
Mona Ezaka (JPN) | 8^{F}
Maria Gkika (GRE) | 0
Nilufar Nurmukhammadova (UZB) | 2
Morgan Nicole Turner (USA) | 4

Final
Mona Ezaka (JPN) | 2
Morgan Nicole Turner (USA) | 3

Repechage round 1
Parveen (IND)
Aleksandra Berezovskaia (ANA) | WO
Saadat Guliyeva (AZE) | 0
Alina Mazharouskaya (ANA) | 10

Bronze medal match
Maria Gkika (GRE) | 1
Aleksandra Berezovskaia (ANA) | 5
Nilufar Nurmukhammadova (UZB) | 10
Alina Mazharouskaya (ANA) | 0

=== Women's freestyle 49 kg ===
2 August

Legend

- F — Won by fall

Round of 16
Lonisa Reka (KOS) | 7^{F}
Eleni Zagliveri (GER) | 4
Lucja Korcz (POL) | 2^{F}
Eunhye Oh (KOR) | 2
Nil Aktaş (TUR) | 0
Heather Crull (USA) | 10
Drishti (IND) | 9
Chloe Brewis (RSA) | 2
Arina Abdullina (KAZ) | 0
Rinka Ogawa (JPN) | 11
Tana Tiuliush (ANA) | 8
Diana Amanturova (KGZ) | 1
Anna Koeblo (HUN) | 6^{F}
Wei Ting Chen (TPE) | 0

Quarterfinals
Sviatlana Katenka (ANA) | 12^{F}
Lonisa Reka (KOS) | 2
Lucja Korcz (POL) | 8
Heather Crull (USA) | 13
Drishti (IND) | 0
Rinka Ogawa (JPN) | 10
Tana Tiuliush (ANA) | 8
Anna Koeblo (HUN) | 1

Semifinals
Sviatlana Katenka (ANA) | 10
Heather Crull (USA) | 1
Rinka Ogawa (JPN) | 6^{F}
Tana Tiuliush (ANA) | 0

Final
Sviatlana Katenka (ANA) | 0
Rinka Ogawa (JPN) | 11

Repechage round 1
Arina Abdullina (KAZ) | 0
Drishti (IND) | 6

Bronze medal match
Lonisa Reka (KOS) | 0
Heather Crull (USA) | 10^{F}
Tana Tiuliush (ANA) | 4
Drishti (IND) | 4

=== Women's freestyle 57 kg ===
2 August

Legend

- F — Won by fall

Round of 32
| | Score | |
|---|---|---|
| Enkhdangina Dejinbee (MGL) | 6-6 Fall | Mariia Beliasova (ANA) |
| Sowaka Uchida (JPN) | 10-0 | Nikola Piechocka (POL) |
| Everest Leydecker (USA) | 0-5 | Neha (IND) |
| Milica Sekulović (SRB) | 4-9 Fall | Aziza Keldibekova (KGZ) |
| Denise Piroddu (ITA) | 0-4 Fall | Viktoria Boynova (BUL) |

Round of 16
Mirijam Hansen (NOR) | 5
Hiunai Hurbanova (AZE) | 4
Mariia Beliasova (ANA) | 4
Yeojin Min (KOR) | 5
Kai Yi Li (TPE) | 0
Sowaka Uchida (JPN) | 10
Neha (IND) | 8
Sabah Eid Khamis (EGY) | 3
Alina Kozhyna (ANA) | 7
Rosa Molina Rodriguez (ESP) | 6
Aziza Keldibekova (KGZ) | 5
Eliana White-Vega (PUR) | 4
Eylem Engin (TUR) | 9
Viktoria Boynova (BUL) | 5
Durdona Saidova (UZB) | 8^{F}
Zhasmin Iskandarova (KAZ) | 0

Quarterfinals
Mirijam Hansen (NOR) | 0
Yeojin Min (KOR) | 7
Sowaka Uchida (JPN) | 8
Neha (IND) | 4
Alina Kozhyna (ANA) | 0
Aziza Keldibekova (KGZ) | 8
Eylem Engin (TUR) | 8
Durdona Saidova (UZB) | 4

Semifinals
Yeojin Min (KOR) | 0
Sowaka Uchida (JPN) | 10
Aziza Keldibekova (KGZ) | 2
Eylem Engin (TUR) | 4

Final
Sowaka Uchida (JPN) | 10
Eylem Engin (TUR) | 0

Repechage round 1
Kai Yi Li (TPE) | 3
Nikola Piechocka (POL) | 1

Repechage round 2
Neha (IND) | 10
Kai Yi Li (TPE) | 0
Viktoria Boynova (BUL) | 3
Durdona Saidova (UZB) | 0

Bronze medal match
Yeojin Min (KOR) | 0
Neha (IND) | 10
Aziza Keldibekova (KGZ) | 4
Viktoria Boynova (BUL) | 5

=== Women's freestyle 65 kg ===
2 August

Legend

- F — Won by fall

Round of 16
Mouda Badawi Hamdoun (EGY) | 10^{F}
Aiana Asamalikova (KGZ) | 1
Duygu Gen (TUR) | 3
Lise Landouzy (FRA) | 0
Viktoria Foeldesiova (SVK) | 11
Maja Nowakowska (POL) | 0
Meiramgul Maksot (KAZ) | 2
Maryia Makarchanka (ANA) | 8
Marina Akhai (MGL) | 0
Chisato Yoshida (JPN) | 10
May Howard Prado (USA) | 0
Mukhayyo Rakhimjonova (UZB) | 8
Sabina Petrache (ROU) | 0
Margarita Salnazarian (ANA) | 9
Shiksha (IND) | 6^{F}
Viktória Pupp (HUN) | 0

Quarterfinals
Mouda Badawi Hamdoun (EGY) | 0
Duygu Gen (TUR) | 2^{F}
Viktoria Foeldesiova (SVK) | 4
Maryia Makarchanka (ANA) | 9
Chisato Yoshida (JPN) | 2
Mukhayyo Rakhimjonova (UZB) | 0
Margarita Salnazarian (ANA) | 3
Shiksha (IND) | 2

Semifinals
Duygu Gen (TUR) | 10
Maryia Makarchanka (ANA) | 1
Chisato Yoshida (JPN) | 5
Margarita Salnazarian (ANA) | 0

Final
Duygu Gen (TUR) | 1
Chisato Yoshida (JPN) | 5

Repechage round 1
Lise Landouzy (FRA) | 0
Mouda Badawi Hamdoun (EGY) | 4^{F}
Mukhayyo Rakhimjonova (UZB) | 8
Marina Akhai (MGL) | 1

Bronze medal match
Maryia Makarchanka (ANA) | 4
Mouda Badawi Hamdoun (EGY) | 10^{F}
Margarita Salnazarian (ANA) | 5^{F}
Mukhayyo Rakhimjonova (UZB) | 0

=== Women's freestyle 73 kg ===
2 August

Legend

- F — Won by fall
- R — Retired

Round of 32
| | Score | |
|---|---|---|
| Diana Titova (ANA) | Fall 10-2 | Kajal (IND) |

Round of 16
Elmira Yasin (TUR) | 8^{F}
Sarah Randrianandrasana (MAD) | 2
Diana Titova (ANA) | 6^{R}
Lotta Englich (GER) | 2
Asaloy Amangeldieva (UZB) | 10
Melissa Belaid (ALG) | 0
Ionela Cojocaru (ROU) | 5^{F}
Petra Mueller (HUN) | 1
Ambre Bouzillard (FRA) | 4
Akylai Abdrakhmanova (KGZ) | 12
Aliaksandra Kazlova (ANA) | 3^{F}
Meruyert Nazarbayeva (KAZ) | 1
Anabela Rados (CRO) | 0
Laia Horta Gallardo (ESP) | 5
Piper Fowler (USA) | 6
Ako Uchiyama (JPN) | 0

Quarterfinals
Elmira Yasin (TUR) | 2
Lotta Englich (GER) | 4
Asaloy Amangeldieva (UZB) | 3
Ionela Cojocaru (ROU) | 1
Akylai Abdrakhmanova (KGZ) | 0
Aliaksandra Kazlova (ANA) | 10
Laia Horta Gallardo (ESP) | 0
Piper Fowler (USA) | 13

Semifinals
Lotta Englich (GER) | 2
Asaloy Amangeldieva (UZB) | 1
Aliaksandra Kazlova (ANA) | 2
Piper Fowler (USA) | 10

Final
Lotta Englich (GER) | 2
Piper Fowler (USA) | 5

Repechage round 1
Diana Titova (ANA)
Elmira Yasin (TUR) | WO
Laia Horta Gallardo (ESP) | 2
Ako Uchiyama (JPN) | 4

Bronze medal match
Asaloy Amangeldieva (UZB) | 0
Elmira Yasin (TUR) | 6
Aliaksandra Kazlova (ANA) | 2
Ako Uchiyama (JPN) | 0
