= 2021 World Junior Wrestling Championships =

- Host city: Ufa, Russia
- Dates: 16–22 August 2021
- Stadium: Ufa Arena

Champions
- Freestyle: Iran
- Greco-Roman: Russia
- Women: United States

The 2021 World Junior Wrestling Championships (U20) were the 44th edition of the World Junior Wrestling Championships and were held in Ufa, Russia between 16 and 22 August 2021.

== Medal table ==
* Host nation (Russia)

Rank	Nation	Gold	Silver	Bronze	Total
1	Russia*	9	2	8	19
2	United States	7	0	4	11
3	Iran	6	2	6	14
4	Belarus	2	1	1	4
5	Azerbaijan	1	4	6	11
6	Turkey	1	2	6	9
7	Kazakhstan	1	1	4	6
8	Moldova	1	1	1	3
9	Netherlands	1	1	0	2
10	Sweden	1	0	1	2
11	India	0	4	7	11
12	Armenia	0	3	2	5
13	Georgia	0	2	1	3
14	Kyrgyzstan	0	1	3	4
15	Mongolia	0	1	1	2
16	France	0	1	0	1
16	Germany	0	1	0	1
16	Italy	0	1	0	1
16	Norway	0	1	0	1
16	Uzbekistan	0	1	0	1
21	Ukraine	0	0	2	2
22	Bahrain	0	0	1	1
22	Estonia	0	0	1	1
22	Hungary	0	0	1	1
22	Poland	0	0	1	1
22	Romania	0	0	1	1
22	Slovakia	0	0	1	1
22	South Africa	0	0	1	1
Totals (28 entries)		30	30	60	120

== Team ranking ==
Rank	Men's freestyle		Men's Greco-Roman		Women's freestyle	
Rank	Team	Points	Team	Points	Team	Points
1	Iran	178	Russia	183	United States	143
2	Russia	142	Iran	130	Russia	134
3	United States	129	Azerbaijan	101	India	134
4	Azerbaijan	122	Turkey	87	Belarus	96
5	India	101	Georgia	81	Turkey	92

== Medal summary ==
=== Men's freestyle ===
Event	Gold	Silver	Bronze
57 kg	(Russia) Ramazan Bagavudinov	(Turkey) Muhammet Karavuş	(Armenia) Manvel Khndzrtsyan
57 kg	(Russia) Ramazan Bagavudinov	(Turkey) Muhammet Karavuş	(Kazakhstan) Assylzhan Yessengeldi
61 kg	(Iran) Rahman Amouzad	(India) Ravinder Dahiya	(Bahrain) Alibeg Alibegov
61 kg	(Iran) Rahman Amouzad	(India) Ravinder Dahiya	(Russia) Fedor Baltuev
65 kg	(Russia) Shamil Mamedov	(Azerbaijan) Ziraddin Bayramov	(Kazakhstan) Bekzat Yermekbay
65 kg	(Russia) Shamil Mamedov	(Azerbaijan) Ziraddin Bayramov	(United States) Beau Bartlett
70 kg	(Iran) Erfan Elahi	(Azerbaijan) Dzhabrail Gadzhiev	(United States) Bryce Andonian
70 kg	(Iran) Erfan Elahi	(Azerbaijan) Dzhabrail Gadzhiev	(Russia) Stanislav Svinoboev
74 kg	(United States) Keegan O'Toole	(Kazakhstan) Nurdaulet Kuanyshbay	(Azerbaijan) Turan Bayramov
74 kg	(United States) Keegan O'Toole	(Kazakhstan) Nurdaulet Kuanyshbay	(India) Yash Tushir
79 kg	(Iran) Mohammad Nokhodi	(Azerbaijan) Ashraf Ashirov	(Kyrgyzstan) Mukhammad Abdullaev
79 kg	(Iran) Mohammad Nokhodi	(Azerbaijan) Ashraf Ashirov	(India) Gourav Baliyan
86 kg	(Iran) Amir Hossein Firouzpour	(France) Rakhim Magamadov	(Russia) Islam Kartoev
86 kg	(Iran) Amir Hossein Firouzpour	(France) Rakhim Magamadov	(Azerbaijan) Sagadulla Agaev
92 kg	(United States) Rocky Elam	(Iran) Mehdi Hajiloueian	(South Africa) Nicolaas De Lange
92 kg	(United States) Rocky Elam	(Iran) Mehdi Hajiloueian	(India) Pruthviraj Patil
97 kg	(United States) Braxton Amos	(Turkey) Polat Polatçı	(Iran) Alireza Abdollahi
97 kg	(United States) Braxton Amos	(Turkey) Polat Polatçı	(India) Deepak Deepak
125 kg	(Iran) Ali Akbarpour	(Armenia) Lyova Gevorgyan	(Russia) Andrei Bestaev
125 kg	(Iran) Ali Akbarpour	(Armenia) Lyova Gevorgyan	(India) Anirudh Gulia

=== Men's Greco-Roman ===
Event	Gold	Silver	Bronze
55 kg	(Iran) Amir Reza Dehbozorgi	(Uzbekistan) Alimardon Abdullaev	(Azerbaijan) Elmir Aliyev
55 kg	(Iran) Amir Reza Dehbozorgi	(Uzbekistan) Alimardon Abdullaev	(Kyrgyzstan) Akyikat Uulu
60 kg	(Russia) Dinislam Bammatov	(Iran) Saeid Esmaeili	(Turkey) Mert İlbars
60 kg	(Russia) Dinislam Bammatov	(Iran) Saeid Esmaeili	(Azerbaijan) Nihat Mammadli
63 kg	(Russia) Said Bakaev	(Georgia (country)) Diego Chkhikvadze	(Sweden) Niklas Öhlén
63 kg	(Russia) Said Bakaev	(Georgia (country)) Diego Chkhikvadze	(Iran) Iman Mohammadi
67 kg	(Azerbaijan) Hasrat Jafarov	(Armenia) Sahak Hovhannisyan	(Russia) Muslim Imadaev
67 kg	(Azerbaijan) Hasrat Jafarov	(Armenia) Sahak Hovhannisyan	(Ukraine) Marian Holubovskyi
72 kg	(Russia) Evgenii Baidusov	(Georgia (country)) Giorgi Chkhikvadze	(Hungary) Attila Tösmagi
72 kg	(Russia) Evgenii Baidusov	(Georgia (country)) Giorgi Chkhikvadze	(Armenia) Shant Khachatryan
77 kg	(Russia) Islam Aliev	(Norway) Exauce Mukubu	(Moldova) Alexandrin Gutu
77 kg	(Russia) Islam Aliev	(Norway) Exauce Mukubu	(Iran) Mohammad Hossein Azarmdokht
82 kg	(Netherlands) Marcel Sterkenburg	(Armenia) Karen Khachatryan	(Iran) Mohammad Naghousi
82 kg	(Netherlands) Marcel Sterkenburg	(Armenia) Karen Khachatryan	(Georgia (country)) Saba Mamaladze
87 kg	(Russia) Adlan Amriev	(Netherlands) Tyrone Sterkenburg	(Ukraine) Oleksandr Prymachenko
87 kg	(Russia) Adlan Amriev	(Netherlands) Tyrone Sterkenburg	(Turkey) Tansel Örtücü
97 kg	(Belarus) Pavel Hlinchuk	(Russia) Aleksei Mileshin	(United States) Braxton Amos
97 kg	(Belarus) Pavel Hlinchuk	(Russia) Aleksei Mileshin	(Iran) Morteza Alghosi
130 kg	(Turkey) Hamza Bakır	(Azerbaijan) Sarkhan Mammadov	(Iran) Amir Mohammad Bayat
130 kg	(Turkey) Hamza Bakır	(Azerbaijan) Sarkhan Mammadov	(Russia) Armen Cholokian

=== Women's freestyle ===
Event	Gold	Silver	Bronze
50 kg	(United States) Emily Shilson	(Mongolia) Batbaataryn Enkhzul	(India) Simran Kaur
50 kg	(United States) Emily Shilson	(Mongolia) Batbaataryn Enkhzul	(Turkey) Zehra Demirhan
53 kg	(Sweden) Jonna Malmgren	(Moldova) Mihaela Samoil	(Turkey) Emine Çakmak
53 kg	(Sweden) Jonna Malmgren	(Moldova) Mihaela Samoil	(Russia) Choigana Tumat
55 kg	(Belarus) Alesia Hetmanava	(Kyrgyzstan) Kalmira Bilimbek Kyzy	(Mongolia) Mönkhbatyn Mönkhgerel
55 kg	(Belarus) Alesia Hetmanava	(Kyrgyzstan) Kalmira Bilimbek Kyzy	(India) Sito Sito
57 kg	(Kazakhstan) Nilufar Raimova	(Italy) Aurora Russo	(Turkey) Elvira Kamaloğlu
57 kg	(Kazakhstan) Nilufar Raimova	(Italy) Aurora Russo	(Kyrgyzstan) Sezim Zhumanazarova
59 kg	(Russia) Anastasiia Sidelnikova	(Belarus) Aryna Martynava	(Kazakhstan) Madina Aman
59 kg	(Russia) Anastasiia Sidelnikova	(Belarus) Aryna Martynava	(Azerbaijan) Zhala Aliyeva
62 kg	(Russia) Alina Kasabieva	(India) Sanju Devi	(United States) Karina Blades
62 kg	(Russia) Alina Kasabieva	(India) Sanju Devi	(Azerbaijan) Birgul Soltanova
65 kg	(Moldova) Irina Rîngaci	(India) Bhateri Bhateri	(Estonia) Viktoria Vesso
65 kg	(Moldova) Irina Rîngaci	(India) Bhateri Bhateri	(Romania) Roxana Capezan
68 kg	(United States) Amit Elor	(Russia) Elizaveta Petliakova	(Turkey) Nesrin Baş
68 kg	(United States) Amit Elor	(Russia) Elizaveta Petliakova	(Slovakia) Zsuzsanna Molnár
72 kg	(United States) Kennedy Blades	(Germany) Lilly Schneider	(Russia) Mariam Guseinova
72 kg	(United States) Kennedy Blades	(Germany) Lilly Schneider	(Poland) Daniela Tkachuk
76 kg	(United States) Kylie Welker	(India) Bipasha Bipasha	(Belarus) Kseniya Dzibuk
76 kg	(United States) Kylie Welker	(India) Bipasha Bipasha	(Kazakhstan) Dilnaz Mulnikova

== Participating nations ==
514 wrestlers from 52 countries:

1. Armenia (17)
2. Australia (1)
3. Austria (2)
4. Azerbaijan (24)
5. Belarus (29)
6. Bahrain (1)
7. Brazil (1)
8. Bulgaria (5)
9. Canada (3)
10. Chile (1)
11. Democratic Republic of the Congo (4)
12. Croatia (6)
13. Czech Republic (3)
14. Egypt (7)
15. Spain (1)
16. Estonia (7)
17. Finland (6)
18. France (3)
19. Georgia (19)
20. Germany (14)
21. Greece (10)
22. Guatemala (3)
23. Hungary (15)
24. India (30)
25. Iran (20)
26. Israel (5)
27. Italy (2)
28. Kazakhstan (30)
29. Kyrgyzstan (26)
30. Latvia (5)
31. Lithuania (3)
32. Moldova (15)
33. Mongolia (14)
34. Netherlands (2)
35. Norway (7)
36. Poland (21)
37. Portugal (2)
38. Romania (7)
39. South Africa (2)
40. Russia (30) (Host)
41. Serbia (3)
42. Sri Lanka (3)
43. Switzerland (2)
44. Slovakia (1)
45. Sweden (7)
46. Tajikistan (9)
47. Tunisia (1)
48. Turkey (30)
49. United Arab Emirates (1)
50. Ukraine (11)
51. United States (30)
52. Uzbekistan (12)
