= Elnura Mammadova =

Azerbaijani freestyle wrestler (born 2002)

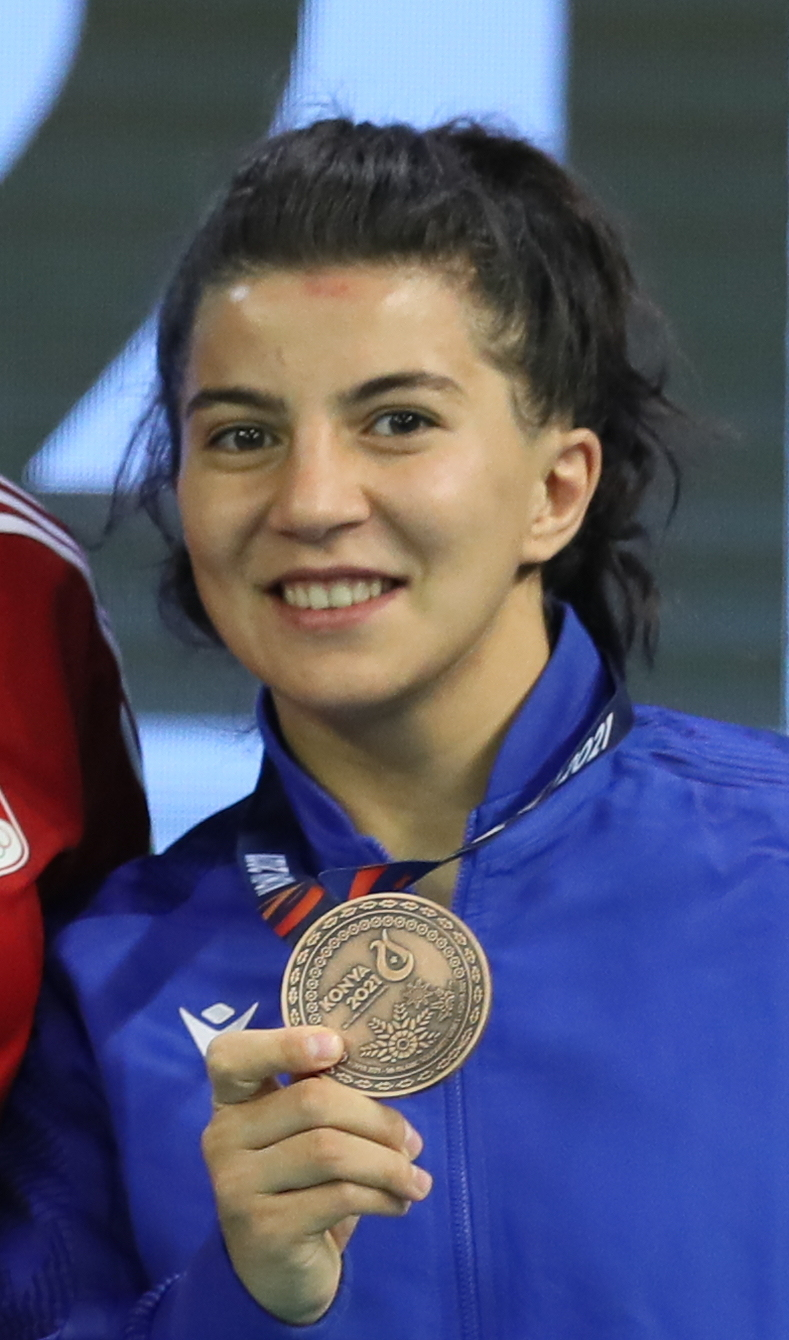

Personal information
- Native name: Elnurə Məmmədova
- Born: 2 January 2002 (age 24) Köhnəqala, Tovuz, Azerbaijan
- Height: 155 cm (5 ft 1 in)
- Weight: 53 kg (117 lb; 8.3 st)

Sport
- Country: Azerbaijan
- Sport: Amateur wrestling
- Event: Freestyle
Medal record
Women's freestyle wrestling
Representing Azerbaijan
Islamic Solidarity Games
Bronze medal – third place	2021 Konya	55 kg
Bronze medal – third place	2025 Riyadh	50 kg
BRICS Games
Gold medal – first place	2024 Kazan	53 kg
World Military Championships
Silver medal – second place	2023 Baku	50 kg
Yasar Dogu Tournament
Gold medal – first place	2023 Istanbul	53 kg
Silver medal – second place	2025 Kocaeli	53 kg
World U23 Championships
Bronze medal – third place	2023 Tirana	50 kg
European U23 Championships
Gold medal – first place	2025 Tirana	53 kg
Silver medal – second place	2022 Plovdiv	55 kg
Silver medal – second place	2024 Baku	53 kg
European U20 Championships
Gold medal – first place	2022 Rome	55 kg
European U17 Championships
Bronze medal – third place	2019 Faenza	53 kg

Elnura Mammadova (born 2 January 2002) is an Azerbaijani freestyle wrestler competing in the 53 kg division.

== Career ==
Elnura Mammadova was born on 2 January 2002 in the village of Kyokhnakala, Tovuz region of Azerbaijan. She has been wrestling since 2015.

In July 2019, Mamedova finished second at the European Summer Youth Olympic Festival in Baku, losing in the final to Russia's Polina Lukina.

In March 2023, Mamedova won bronze at the European Under-23 Championships in Bucharest in the 55 kg weight category. In April 2023, she competed at the European Senior Championships in Zagreb, where she lost in Round of 16 to European champion Andreea Ana of Romania, and in the bronze medal bout to Poland's Katarzyna Krawczyk.

In May 2024, she won silver at the European Under-23 Championships in Baku. In June of the same year, she won gold at the BRICS Games in Kazan.

Elnura Mammadova won the gold medal in the women's freestyle 53 kg category at the 2025 European U23 Wrestling Championships held in Tirana, Albania.
