= Haticenur Sarı =

Turkish freestyle wrestler

Personal information
- Born: 1 January 2006 (age 20) Kozan, Adana, Turkey
- Height: 1.70 m (5 ft 7 in)
- Weight: 72 kg (159 lb; 11.3 st)

Sport
- Country: Turkey
- Sport: Women's freestyle wrestling
- Event: 72 kg
- Club: Ankara ASKI Sports Club
Medal record
Women's freestyle wrestling
Representing Turkey
Yasar Dogu Tournament
Bronze medal – third place	2025 Kocaeli	72 kg
Bronze medal – third place	2026 Antalya	72 kg
European U23 Championships
Bronze medal – third place	2025 Tirana	72 kg

Haticenur Sarı (born 2006) is a Turkish freestyle wrestler competing in the 72 kg division. She is a member of Ankara ASKI Sports Club

== Career ==
Haticenur Sarı lost to Poland's Daniela Tkachuk in the quarter-finals of the women's freestyle 72 kg at the 2025 European U23 Wrestling Championships in Tirana, Albania. After her opponent reached the final, she played for the bronze medal. In the bronze medal match, she tied with Hungarian Noémi Osváth-Nagy 6-6 and with the advantage of the last point, she defeated her opponent and ranked third.
