= 2026 European Wrestling Championships – Women's freestyle 72 kg =

Wrestling competition held in Tirana, Albania

Women's freestyle 72 kg at the 2026 European Wrestling Championships
- Venue: Tirana Olympic Park
- Location: Tirana, Albania
- Dates: 23–24 April
- Competitors: 10 from 8 nations

Medalists
gold medal	Nadiia Sokolovska	Ukraine
silver medal	Wiktoria Chołuj	Poland
bronze medal	Kristina Bratchikova
bronze medal	Buse Tosun Çavuşoğlu	Turkey

The women's freestyle 72 kilograms competition at the 2026 European Wrestling Championships was held from 23 to 24 April 2026 at the Tirana Olympic Park in Tirana, Albania.

== Results ==
Legend

- F — Won by fall

=== Main bracket ===
Round of 16
Vincenza Amendola (ITA)	3
Nadiia Sokolovska (UKR)	5^{F}
Alīna Antipova (LAT)	0
Viktoryia Radzkova (UWW)	7

Quarterfinals
Zsuzsanna Molnár (SVK)	1
Nadiia Sokolovska (UKR)	12^{F}
Maša Perović (SRB)	0
Kristina Bratchikova (UWW)	7^{F}
Wiktoria Chołuj (POL)	7
Karolina Pók (HUN)	1
Viktoryia Radzkova (UWW)	2
Buse Tosun Çavuşoğlu (TUR)	4^{F}

Semifinals
Nadiia Sokolovska (UKR)	8^{F}
Kristina Bratchikova (UWW)	0
Wiktoria Chołuj (POL)	8
Buse Tosun Çavuşoğlu (TUR)	2

Final
Nadiia Sokolovska (UKR)	5
Wiktoria Chołuj (POL)	3

=== Repechage ===
Repechage round 1
Vincenza Amendola (ITA)	0
Zsuzsanna Molnár (SVK)	6^{F}

Bronze medal matches
Zsuzsanna Molnár (SVK)	0
Kristina Bratchikova (UWW)	3
Karolina Pók (HUN)	6
Buse Tosun Çavuşoğlu (TUR)	9

== Final standing ==
Rank	Wrestler
1st place, gold medalist(s)	Nadiia Sokolovska (UKR)
2nd place, silver medalist(s)	Wiktoria Chołuj (POL)
3rd place, bronze medalist(s)	Kristina Bratchikova (UWW)
3rd place, bronze medalist(s)	Buse Tosun Çavuşoğlu (TUR)
5	Zsuzsanna Molnár (SVK)
5	Karolina Pók (HUN)
7	Viktoryia Radzkova (UWW)
8	Vincenza Amendola (ITA)
9	Maša Perović (SRB)
10	Alīna Antipova (LAT)
