= Denys Sahaliuk =

Ukrainian freestyle wrestler

Personal information
- Born: Денис Валентинович Сагалюк; 23 August 2002 (age 23) Kolomyia, Ivano-Frankivsk region, Ukraine

Sport
- Country: Ukraine
- Sport: Wrestling
- Weight class: 80, 86-92 kg
- Event: Freestyle
Medal record
Men's freestyle wrestling
Representing Ukraine
European U23 Championships
Bronze medal – third place	2021 Skopje	86 kg
Bronze medal – third place	2025 Tirana	92 kg
European Junior Championships
Bronze medal – third place	2022 Rome	92 kg
World Cadets Championships
Bronze medal – third place	2019 Sofia	80 kg
European Cadets Championships
Silver medal – second place	2019 Faenza	80 kg
Bronze medal – third place	2018 Skopje	80 kg

Denys Valentynovych Sahaliuk (Ukrainian: Денис Валентинович Сагалюк; born 23 August 2002 in Kolomyia) is a Ukrainian freestyle wrestler.

== Career ==
In March 2018, Sahaliuk won a gold medal at the Ukrainian Cadets Wrestling Championships in Bakhmut in 80 kg event. In May, he won a first medal at the continental championships, receiving a bronze one at the European Cadets Championships in Skopje. In October, he received a gold medal at the Wrestling Cadets Cup of Poland in 80 kg event.

In 2019, Denys competed at the 2019 World Cadets Wrestling Championships, held in Sofia, Bulgaria, where he won a bronze medal in 80 kg event. Also he received a silver medal at the 2019 European Cadets Wrestling Championships in 80 kg.

In the following years, Denys represented Ukraine at the 2021 European U23 Wrestling Championships in Skopje, winning a bronze medal in 86 kg event. He also competed at the 2021 U23 World Wrestling Championships, where he lost to Belarusian wrestler Arkadzi Pahasian in the round of 16.

In 2022, he competed at the European Juniors Championships, held in Rome, receiving a bronze medal in 92 kg event. In August, Sahaliuk represented Ukraine at the U20 World Championships in Sofia, finishing 14th after losing to Greek wrestler Gkivi Bliatze in the round of 16. In October, Denys competed at the U23 World Championships in Pontevedra, where he lost the Georgian wrestler Miriani Maisuradze in the bronze medal match.

In 2023, Denys competed at the Dan Kolov & Nikola Petrov Tournament in Sofia, without receiving any medal after losing to Azerbaijani wrestler Ibrahim Yusubov in the round of 16. In July, Sahaliuk finished in the last place of the group stage at the Polyák Imre & Varga János Memorial Tournament in Budapest. In September, Denys represented his country at the World Championships, but he didn't receive any medal. In October, Sahaliuk competed at the U23 World Championships in Tirana, losing to Ion Demian in the round of 32.

In February 2024, he lost his bronze medal match in the men's 92 kg event at the 2024 European Wrestling Championships held in Bucharest, Romania. In May, Denys represented his country at the European U23 Championships in Baku, where he lost to Greek wrestler Gkivi Bliatze in the quarterfinals. In October, Sahaliuk competed at the U23 World Championships in Tirana, losing to Nicolaas De Lange from South Africa in the round of 16.

In March 2025, he competed at the European U23 Championships in Tirana, winning a bronze medal in the 92 kg event.
