= Polat Polatçı =

Turkish freestyle wrestler (born 2001)

Personal information
- Born: 27 January 2001 (age 25) Istanbul, Turkey
- Education: Bartın University
- Height: 1.85 m (6 ft 1 in)
- Weight: 97 kg (214 lb; 15.3 st)

Sport
- Country: Turkey
- Sport: Amateur wrestling
- Event: Freestyle
- Club: İstanbul Büyükşehir Belediyesi S.K.
Medal record
Men's freestyle wrestling
Representing Turkey
World Juniors Championships
Silver medal – second place	2021 Ufa	97kg
European Juniors Championships
Gold medal – first place	2021 Dortmund	97kg

Polat Polatçı (born 27 January 2001) is a Turkish freestyle wrestler competing in the 97 kg division. He is a member of İstanbul Büyükşehir Belediyesi S.K.

== Career ==
Polat Polatçı won the gold medal in the men's 97 kg event at the 2021 European Juniors Wrestling Championships in Germany. Polat Polatçı was behind his Russian rival Ali Magomed Aliyev 13–6 in the final in the European Youth Wrestling Championship in Dortmund, Germany, and became the European champion by beating his opponent with a pin.

Polat Polatçı won the silver medal in the men's 97 kg event at the 2021 World Junior Wrestling Championships in Russia.
