= Selvi İlyasoğlu =

Turkish freestyle wrestler

Personal information
- Born: 11 October 2004 (age 21) Baku, Azerbaijan
- Height: 1.65 m (5 ft 5 in)
- Weight: 62 kg (137 lb)

Sport
- Country: Turkey
- Sport: Women's freestyle wrestling
- Event: 62 kg
- Club: Beşiktaş J.K.
Medal record
Women's freestyle wrestling
Representing Turkey
Islamic Solidarity Games
Bronze medal – third place	2025 Riyadh	57 kg
European U23 Championships
Bronze medal – third place	2025 Tirana	62 kg
European U20 Championships
Bronze medal – third place	2023 Santiago	62 kg
World U17 Championships
Gold medal – first place	2021 Budapest	57 kg

Selvi İlyasoğlu (born 11 October 2004) is a Turkish freestyle wrestler competing in the 62 kg division. She is a member of Beşiktaş J.K.

== Career ==
She won the gold medal by defeating Swedish Tindra Dalmyr 4-0 in the women's freestyle 57 kg final match at the 2021 World Cadets Wrestling Championships held in Budapest, Hungary. She had reached the final by defeating American Marina Cosme 6-0 in the first round, Mongolian Khaliun Byambasuren 4-3 in the quarter-finals and Russian Angelina Pervukhina 5-2 in the semi-finals. According to the statement made by the Turkish Wrestling Federation, Selvi İlyasoğlu is the first world champion Turkish athlete in cadets.

She won one of the bronze medals by defeating German Luisa Scheel in the women's freestyle 62 kg third place match at the 2023 European Juniors Wrestling Championships in Santiago de Compostela, Spain.

Selvi İlyasoğlu reached the quarter-finals in the women's freestyle 62 kg category at the European U23 Wrestling Championships in Tirana, Albania, defeating Serbian Jovana Radivojević with a 10-0 technical superiority in the first round. In the quarter-finals, she lost to Amina Tandelova, who competed for Russia as an Individual Independent. Her opponent reached the final and qualified for the repechage. In the repechage match, she defeated Lithuanian Ineta Dantaitė with 11-0 technical superiority and in the bronze medal match, she defeated French Iris Thiebaux 5-3 and won one of bronze medals.

== Personal life ==
İlyasoğlu is of Turkish Meskhetian origin.
