= Rakhim Magamadov =

French freestyle wrestler

Personal information
- Native name: Рахим Магамадов
- Born: 29 October 2003 (age 22) Chechnya, Russia
- Height: 185 cm (6 ft 1 in)
- Weight: 86 kg (190 lb; 13.5 st)

Sport
- Country: France
- Sport: Amateur wrestling
- Event: Freestyle
- Club: Sarreguemines
Medal record
Men's freestyle wrestling
Representing France
Grand Prix
| Bronze medal – third place | 2023 Budapest | 86 kg |
Mediterranean Games
| Bronze medal – third place | 2026 Taranto | 86 kg |
World Military Championships
| Gold medal – first place | 2025 Warendorf | 86 kg |
| Silver medal – second place | 2024 Yerevan | 86 kg |
European U23 Championships
| Gold medal – first place | 2023 Bucharest | 86 kg |
| Silver medal – second place | 2024 Baku | 86 kg |
| Silver medal – second place | 2025 Tirana | 86 kg |
| Bronze medal – third place | 2026 Zrenjanin | 86 kg |
World U20 Championships
| Gold medal – first place | 2022 Sofia | 86 kg |
| Gold medal – first place | 2023 Amman | 86 kg |
| Silver medal – second place | 2021 Ufa | 86 kg |
European U20 Championships
| Gold medal – first place | 2022 Rome | 86 kg |
| Gold medal – first place | 2023 Santiago | 86 kg |
| Bronze medal – third place | 2021 Dortmund | 86 kg |
World U17 Championships
| Bronze medal – third place | 2019 Sofia | 80 kg |
European U17 Championships
| Bronze medal – third place | 2019 Faenza | 80 kg |

Rakhim Magamadov (Russian: Рахим Магамадов; born 29 October 2003) is a Chechen-born French wrestler.

== Career ==
He was born in Chechnya in 2003, but his parents fled the war and arrived in France in 2007. He started wrestling at a club in Tarn-et-Garonne. He chose this sport because practising a combat sport in Chechnya is an obligation, but also a cultural marker. Furthermore, his father didn't want him to play any other sport.

He tried Greco-Roman wrestling before opting for freestyle. During the French championships, he was spotted by the selectors and joined the Pôle France in Dijon for two years. He then entered the INSEP, where he met Akhmed Aibuev and Ilman Mukhtarov.

He was one of fourteen French competitors (seven in women's wrestling, five in Greco-Roman and two in freestyle) at the senior world championships in Belgrade, Serbia, in a bid to qualify directly for the 2024 Olympic Games. He was eliminated in the quarter-finals. He was part of the French team selection for the European TQO in Baku, Azerbaijan, from 5 to 7 April. He lost in the quarter-finals to Ukraine's Vasyl Mykhailov, disqualifying him from the 2024 Olympic Games.

Silver medallist at the Military World Cup in 2024. European U-23 champion in 2023, second in 2024. World junior champion in 2022 and 2023, second in 2021. European junior champion in 2022 and 2023, third in 2021.
