= 2025 European U23 Wrestling Championships =

2025 European U23 Championships
- Host city: Tirana, Albania
- Dates: 8–14 March 2025
- Stadium: Tirana Olympic Park

Champions
- Freestyle: Azerbaijan
- Greco-Roman: Georgia
- Women: Turkey

The 2025 European U23 Wrestling Championships is the 10th edition of the European U23 Wrestling Championships of combined events, and it was held from 8 to 14 March in Tirana, Albania.

== Competition schedule ==
All times are (UTC+1)

Date	Time	Event
8 March	10.30-13.30	Qualification rounds: FS 57-65-70-79-97 kg
8 March	18:30-19.30	Semi-finals: FS 57-65-70-79-97 kg
9 March	10.30-13.30	Qualification rounds: FS 61-74-86-92-125 kg; Repechage: FS 57-65-70-79-97 kg
9 March	16.45-17.45	Semi-finals: FS 61-74-86-92-125 kg
9 March	18.00-20.30	Finals: FS 57-65-70-79-97 kg
10 March	10.30-14.00	Qualification rounds: WW – 50,55,59,68,76 kg; Repechage: FS 61-74-86-92-125 kg
10 March	16.45-17.45	Semi-finals: WW – 50,55,59,68,76 kg
10 March	18.00-20.30	Finals: FS 61-74-86-92-125 kg
11 March	10.30-14.00	Qualification rounds: WW – 53,57,62,65,72 kg; Repechage: WW – 50,55,59,68,76 kg
11 March	16.45-17.45	Semi-finals: WW – 53,57,62,65,72 kg
11 March	18.00-20.30	Finals: WW – 50,55,59,68,76 kg
12 March	10.30-14.00	Qualification rounds: GR – 55-63-77-87-130 kg; Repechage: WW – 53,57,62,65,72 kg
12 March	16.45-17.45	Semi-finals: GR – 55-63-77-87-130 kg
12 March	18.00-20.30	Finals: WW – 53,57,62,65,72 kg
13 March	10.30-14.00	Qualification rounds: FS – 61,74,86,92,125 kg; Repechage: GR – 55-63-77-87-130 kg
13 March	16.45-17.45	Semi-finals: GR – 60-67-72-82-97 kg
13 March	18.00-20.30	Finals: GR – 55-63-77-87-130 kg
14 March	16.30-17.45	Repechage: GR – 60-67-72-82-97 kg
14 March	18.00-20.30	Finals: GR – 60-67-72-82-97 kg

== Medal table ==
* Host nation (Albania)

Rank	Nation	Gold	Silver	Bronze	Total
–	United World Wrestling	13	9	9	31
1	Azerbaijan	4	5	7	16
2	Turkey	4	1	11	16
3	Ukraine	3	3	7	13
4	Georgia	2	2	4	8
5	Moldova	2	1	3	6
6	Armenia	1	1	3	5
7	Bulgaria	1	0	0	1
8	France	0	2	1	3
9	Poland	0	1	3	4
10	Germany	0	1	2	3
10	Hungary	0	1	2	3
12	Estonia	0	1	0	1
12	Israel	0	1	0	1
12	Italy	0	1	0	1
15	Croatia	0	0	1	1
15	Denmark	0	0	1	1
15	Finland	0	0	1	1
15	Greece	0	0	1	1
15	Romania	0	0	1	1
15	Spain	0	0	1	1
15	Sweden	0	0	1	1
15	Switzerland	0	0	1	1
Totals (22 entries)		30	30	60	120

== Team ranking ==
Rank	Men's freestyle		Men's Greco-Roman		Women's freestyle	
Rank	Team	Points	Team	Points	Team	Points
1	Azerbaijan	169	Georgia	133	Turkey	144
2	Turkey	117	Ukraine	99	Ukraine	127
3	Ukraine	104	Turkey	98	Poland	93
4	Georgia	89	Azerbaijan	91	Azerbaijan	89
5	Armenia	86	Moldova	85	Hungary	74
6	Moldova	80	Armenia	70	Romania	67
7	Bulgaria	61	Sweden	39	Italy	60
8	France	41	France	32	Germany	56
9	Italy	18	Czech Republic	32	Spain	25
10	Poland	16	Bulgaria	32	Moldova	20

== Medal overview ==
=== Men's freestyle ===
Event	Gold	Silver	Bronze
57 kg	Lev Pavlov; United World Wrestling	Nika Zangaladze; Georgia	Bekir Keser; Turkey
57 kg	Lev Pavlov; United World Wrestling	Nika Zangaladze; Georgia	Rahman Imanov; Azerbaijan
61 kg	Levik Mikayelyan; Armenia	Jeyhun Allahverdiyev; Azerbaijan	Tolga Özbek; Turkey
61 kg	Levik Mikayelyan; Armenia	Jeyhun Allahverdiyev; Azerbaijan	Mykyta Abramov; Ukraine
65 kg	Amal Dzhandubaev; United World Wrestling	Abdullah Toprak; Turkey	Khamzat Arsamerzouev; France
65 kg	Amal Dzhandubaev; United World Wrestling	Abdullah Toprak; Turkey	Murad Hagverdiyev; Azerbaijan
70 kg	Magomed-Emi Eltemirov; United World Wrestling	Kanan Heybatov; Azerbaijan	Umut Erdoğan; Turkey
70 kg	Magomed-Emi Eltemirov; United World Wrestling	Kanan Heybatov; Azerbaijan	Narek Pohosian; Ukraine
74 kg	Ismail Khaniev; United World Wrestling	Aghanazar Novruzov; Azerbaijan	Ion Marcu; Moldova
74 kg	Ismail Khaniev; United World Wrestling	Aghanazar Novruzov; Azerbaijan	Luka Chkhitunidze; Georgia
79 kg	Arsen Balaian; United World Wrestling	Farid Jabbarov; Azerbaijan	Metehan Yaprak; Turkey
79 kg	Arsen Balaian; United World Wrestling	Farid Jabbarov; Azerbaijan	Umar Mavlaev; Switzerland
86 kg	Arsenii Dzhioev; Azerbaijan	Rakhim Magamadov; France	Eugeniu Mihalcean; Moldova
86 kg	Arsenii Dzhioev; Azerbaijan	Rakhim Magamadov; France	Arslan Bagaev; United World Wrestling
92 kg	Mukhamed-Takhir Khaniev; United World Wrestling	Knyaz Iboyan; Armenia	Denys Sahaliuk; Ukraine
92 kg	Mukhamed-Takhir Khaniev; United World Wrestling	Knyaz Iboyan; Armenia	Sadig Mustafazade; Azerbaijan
97 kg	Uladzislau Kazlou; United World Wrestling	Bady-Maadyr Samdan; United World Wrestling	Resul Güne; Turkey
97 kg	Uladzislau Kazlou; United World Wrestling	Bady-Maadyr Samdan; United World Wrestling	David Mchedlidze; Ukraine
125 kg	Georgi Ivanov; Bulgaria	Volodymyr Kochanov; Ukraine	Khachatur Khachatryan; Armenia
125 kg	Georgi Ivanov; Bulgaria	Volodymyr Kochanov; Ukraine	Yusif Dursunov; Azerbaijan

=== Men's Greco-Roman ===
Event	Gold	Silver	Bronze
55 kg	Alibek Amirov; United World Wrestling	Koba Karumidze; Georgia	Arayik Topalyan; Armenia
55 kg	Alibek Amirov; United World Wrestling	Koba Karumidze; Georgia	Elmir Aliyev; Azerbaijan
60 kg	Dimitri Khachidze; Georgia	Melkamu Fetene; Israel	Papik Dzhavadian; United World Wrestling
60 kg	Dimitri Khachidze; Georgia	Melkamu Fetene; Israel	Mert İlbars; Turkey
63 kg	Vitalie Eriomenco; Moldova	Ziya Babashov; Azerbaijan	Alexander Vafai; Sweden
63 kg	Vitalie Eriomenco; Moldova	Ziya Babashov; Azerbaijan	Romeo Beridze; Georgia
67 kg	Anri Khozrevanidze; Georgia	Hleb Makaranka; United World Wrestling	Daniial Agaev; United World Wrestling
67 kg	Anri Khozrevanidze; Georgia	Hleb Makaranka; United World Wrestling	Azat Sarıyar; Turkey
72 kg	Ruslan Nurullayev; Azerbaijan	Danil Grigorev; United World Wrestling	Oleh Khalilov; Ukraine
72 kg	Ruslan Nurullayev; Azerbaijan	Danil Grigorev; United World Wrestling	Arionas Kolitsopoulos; Greece
77 kg	Evgenii Baidusov; United World Wrestling	Aaron Bellscheidt; Germany	Alexandrin Guțu; Moldova
77 kg	Evgenii Baidusov; United World Wrestling	Aaron Bellscheidt; Germany	Khasay Hasanli; Azerbaijan
82 kg	Alexandru Solovei; Moldova	Gamzat Gadzhiev; United World Wrestling	Jonni Sarkkinen; Finland
82 kg	Alexandru Solovei; Moldova	Gamzat Gadzhiev; United World Wrestling	Frederik Mathiesen; Denmark
87 kg	Alperen Berber; Turkey	Vladimeri Karchaidze; France	Vigen Nazaryan; Armenia
87 kg	Alperen Berber; Turkey	Vladimeri Karchaidze; France	Baskhan Saidov; United World Wrestling
97 kg	Yehor Yakushenko; Ukraine	Richard Karelson; Estonia	Abubakar Khaslakhanau; United World Wrestling
97 kg	Yehor Yakushenko; Ukraine	Richard Karelson; Estonia	Luka Gabisonia; Georgia
130 kg	Mykhailo Vyshnyvetskyi; Ukraine	Magomed Alichuev; United World Wrestling	Cemal Yusuf Bakır; Turkey
130 kg	Mykhailo Vyshnyvetskyi; Ukraine	Magomed Alichuev; United World Wrestling	Saba Chilashvili; Georgia

=== Women's freestyle ===
Event	Gold	Silver	Bronze
50 kg	Natalia Pudova; United World Wrestling	Anastasiya Yanotava; United World Wrestling	Natalia Walczak; Poland
50 kg	Natalia Pudova; United World Wrestling	Anastasiya Yanotava; United World Wrestling	Asmar Jankurtaran; Azerbaijan
53 kg	Elnura Mammadova; Azerbaijan	Ekaterina Karpushkina; United World Wrestling	Carla Jaume; Spain
53 kg	Elnura Mammadova; Azerbaijan	Ekaterina Karpushkina; United World Wrestling	Viktoriya Volk; United World Wrestling
55 kg	Tuba Demir; Turkey	Mihaela Samoil; Moldova	Róza Szenttamási; Hungary
55 kg	Tuba Demir; Turkey	Mihaela Samoil; Moldova	Amory Andrich; Germany
57 kg	Aryna Martynava; United World Wrestling	Alina Filipovych; Ukraine	Gerda Terék; Hungary
57 kg	Aryna Martynava; United World Wrestling	Alina Filipovych; Ukraine	Georgiana Lircă; Romania
59 kg	Hiunai Hurbanova; Azerbaijan	Aurora Russo; Italy	Marta Hetmanava; United World Wrestling
59 kg	Hiunai Hurbanova; Azerbaijan	Aurora Russo; Italy	Ebru Dağbaşı; Turkey
62 kg	Iryna Bondar; Ukraine	Amina Tandelova; United World Wrestling	Alicja Nowosad; Poland
62 kg	Iryna Bondar; Ukraine	Amina Tandelova; United World Wrestling	Selvi İlyasoğlu; Turkey
65 kg	Kseniya Tsiarenia; United World Wrestling	Enikő Elekes; Hungary	Luisa Scheel; Germany
65 kg	Kseniya Tsiarenia; United World Wrestling	Enikő Elekes; Hungary	Oleksandra Rybak; Ukraine
68 kg	Nesrin Baş; Turkey	Manola Skobelska; Ukraine	Viktoryia Radzkova; United World Wrestling
68 kg	Nesrin Baş; Turkey	Manola Skobelska; Ukraine	Karolina Domaszuk; Poland
72 kg	Kristina Bratchikova; United World Wrestling	Daniela Tkachuk; Poland	Haticenur Sarı; Turkey
72 kg	Kristina Bratchikova; United World Wrestling	Daniela Tkachuk; Poland	Veronika Vilk; Croatia
76 kg	Elmira Yasin; Turkey	Olga Kozyreva; United World Wrestling	Hanna Pirskaya; United World Wrestling
76 kg	Elmira Yasin; Turkey	Olga Kozyreva; United World Wrestling	Mariia Orlevych; Ukraine

== Participating nations ==
423 wrestlers from 33 countries:

1. Albania (16) (Host)
2. Armenia (19)
3. Austria (3)
4. Azerbaijan (27)
5. Belgium (5)
6. Bulgaria (21)
7. Croatia (3)
8. Czech Republic (6)
9. Denmark (3)
10. Spain (7)
11. Estonia (4)
12. Finland (5)
13. France (8)
14. Georgia (20)
15. Germany (16)
16. Greece (13)
17. Hungary (18)
18. Israel (4)
19. Italy (16)
20. Kosovo (1)
21. Lithuania (8)
22. Moldova (19)
23. North Macedonia (4)
24. Netherlands (1)
25. Norway (2)
26. Poland (25)
27. Romania (15)
28. Serbia (11)
29. Switzerland (3)
30. Slovakia (2)
31. Sweden (6)
32. Turkey (30)
33. Ukraine (30)
34. United World Wrestling (Russia+Belarus) (52)

== Results ==
Legend

- F — Won by fall
- R — Retired
- WO — Won by walkover

=== Men's freestyle ===
==== Men's freestyle 57 kg ====
Main bracket

Round of 16
Bekir Keser (TUR)	10
Danny Lubrano (ITA)	0
Rahman Imanov (AZE)	0
Lev Pavlov (UWW)	3
Ersjan Kashiku (ALB)	4
Ivaylo Tisov (BUL)	14

Quarterfinals
Norik Harutyunyan (ARM)	5
Bekir Keser (TUR)	8
Ion Bulgaru (MDA)	2
Nika Zangaladze (GEO)	4^{F}
Stefan Shterjov (MKD)	0
Lev Pavlov (UWW)	10
Ivaylo Tisov (BUL)	2
Vladyslav Abramov (UKR)	12

Semifinals
Bekir Keser (TUR)	2
Nika Zangaladze (GEO)	12
Lev Pavlov (UWW)	10
Vladyslav Abramov (UKR)	0

Final
Nika Zangaladze (GEO)	1
Lev Pavlov (UWW)	6

Repechage round
Rahman Imanov (AZE)	11
Stefan Shterjov (MKD)	0

Bronze medal match
Ion Bulgaru (MDA)	14
Bekir Keser (TUR)	18
Rahman Imanov (AZE)	8
Vladyslav Abramov (UKR)	6

==== Men's freestyle 61 kg ====
Main bracket

Round of 16
Denis Naim (BUL)	2
Besir Alili (MKD)	7
Jeyhun Allahverdiyev (AZE)	10
Endrio Avdyli (ALB)	0
Akhmed Zubairov (UWW)	5
Tolga Özbek (TUR)	9
Mykyta Abramov (UKR)	12
Ivan Oksiuk (POL)	5
Omar Gazashvili (GEO)	0
Vasile Marcu (MDA)	10
Simone Piroddu (ITA)	5^{F}
Balázs Rácz (HUN)	0
Dario Dittrich (GER)	0
Levik Mikayelyan (ARM)	10

Quarterfinals
Ivan Hramyka (UWW)	5
Besir Alili (MKD)	6
Jeyhun Allahverdiyev (AZE)	6
Tolga Özbek (TUR)	3
Mykyta Abramov (UKR)	5
Vasile Marcu (MDA)	2
Simone Piroddu (ITA)	1
Levik Mikayelyan (ARM)	12^{F}

Semifinals
Besir Alili (MKD)	4
Jeyhun Allahverdiyev (AZE)	5
Mykyta Abramov (UKR)	1
Levik Mikayelyan (ARM)	11

Final
Jeyhun Allahverdiyev (AZE)	1
Levik Mikayelyan (ARM)	2

Repechage round
~~Endrio Avdyli (ALB)~~
Tolga Özbek (TUR)	WO
Dario Dittrich (GER)	5
Simone Piroddu (ITA)	16

Bronze medal match
Tolga Özbek (TUR)	10^{F}
Besir Alili (MKD)	0
Simone Piroddu (ITA)	0
Mykyta Abramov (UKR)	10

==== Men's freestyle 65 kg ====
Final

Final
Abdullah Toprak (TUR)	4
Amal Dzhandubaev (UWW)	6

Top half

Qualification
Klevisi Preci (ALB)	11
Mattia Bientinesi (ITA)	1

Round of 16
Khamzat Arsamerzouev (FRA)	11
Artiom Cvetkov (LTU)	0
Klevisi Preci (ALB)	0
Goga Otinashvili (GEO)	10
Erdal Galip (BUL)	1
Anatoli Hramyka (UWW)	11
Hayk Abrahamyan (ARM)	2
Abdullah Toprak (TUR)	7

Quarterfinals
Khamzat Arsamerzouev (FRA)	3
Goga Otinashvili (GEO)	3
Anatoli Hramyka (UWW)	1
Abdullah Toprak (TUR)	12

Semifinals
Khamzat Arsamerzouev (FRA)	4
Abdullah Toprak (TUR)	7

Bottom half

Qualification
Marcel Wagin (GER)	8
Daniel Kulczyński (POL)	5
Mykyta Honcharov (UKR)	10
Ayub Musaev (BEL)	2

Round of 16
Zoltán Mizsei (HUN)	8
Marian Sandu (ROU)	19
Marcel Wagin (GER)	3
Fiodor Ceavdari (MDA)	14^{F}
Amal Dzhandubaev (UWW)	10
Mykyta Honcharov (UKR)	0
Murad Hagverdiyev (AZE)	5
Felipe Ferrusola (ESP)	1

Quarterfinals
Marian Sandu (ROU)	10
Fiodor Ceavdari (MDA)	13
Amal Dzhandubaev (UWW)	8
Murad Hagverdiyev (AZE)	4

Semifinals
Fiodor Ceavdari (MDA)	0
Amal Dzhandubaev (UWW)	10

Repechage round 2
Hayk Abrahamyan (ARM)	8
Anatoli Hramyka (UWW)	5
Mykyta Honcharov (UKR)	4
Murad Hagverdiyev (AZE)	5

Bronze medal match
Hayk Abrahamyan (ARM)	2
Khamzat Arsamerzouev (FRA)	3
Murad Hagverdiyev (AZE)	9
Fiodor Ceavdari (MDA)	6

==== Men's freestyle 70 kg ====
Final

Final
Magomed-Emi Eltemirov (UWW)	11
Kanan Heybatov (AZE)	0

Top half

Qualification
Muhamed Feruki (MKD)	0
Magomed-Emi Eltemirov (UWW)	10

Round of 16
Alexander Seiwald (AUT)	0
Pavel Graur (MDA)	10
Magomed-Emi Eltemirov (UWW)	10
Denis Kodakov (ESP)	0
Umut Erdoğan (TUR)	10
Fabian Kocileri (ALB)	0
Burak Emin Salviz (GER)	2
Davit Patsinashvili (GEO)	4

Quarterfinals
Pavel Graur (MDA)	0
Magomed-Emi Eltemirov (UWW)	11
Umut Erdoğan (TUR)	3
Davit Patsinashvili (GEO)	2

Semifinals
Magomed-Emi Eltemirov (UWW)	12
Umut Erdoğan (TUR)	2

Bottom half

Qualification
Vladimir Azaryan (ARM)	8
Márton Varga (HUN)	3

Round of 16
Paolo Pio Lumia (ITA)	0
Muhammad Abdurachmanov (BEL)	11
Mikita Dzemchanka (UWW)	15
Mateusz Łuszczyński (POL)	8
Kaloyan Atanasov (BUL)	11
Vladimir Azaryan (ARM)	0
Narek Pohosian (UKR)	0
Kanan Heybatov (AZE)	10

Quarterfinals
Muhammad Abdurachmanov (BEL)	9
Mikita Dzemchanka (UWW)	4
Kaloyan Atanasov (BUL)	0
Kanan Heybatov (AZE)	10

Semifinals
Muhammad Abdurachmanov (BEL)	0
Kanan Heybatov (AZE)	10

Repechage round 1
Muhamed Feruki (MKD)	5
Denis Kodakov (ESP)	8

Repechage round 2
Denis Kodakov (ESP)	0
Pavel Graur (MDA)	6^{F}
Narek Pohosian (UKR)	4
Kaloyan Atanasov (BUL)	0

Bronze medals
Pavel Graur (MDA)	1
Umut Erdoğan (TUR)	5
Narek Pohosian (UKR)	2
Muhammad Abdurachmanov (BEL)	0

==== Men's freestyle 74 kg ====
Final

Final
Aghanazar Novruzov (AZE)	4
Ismail Khaniev (UWW)	5

Top half

Qualification
Stiliyan Dzhorov (BUL)	0
Marian Subțirică (ROU)	10

Round of 16
Manuel Wagin (GER)	9
Theocharis Kougioumtsidis (GRE)	0
Marian Subțirică (ROU)	10
Fabian Niedźwiedzki (POL)	0
Aghanazar Novruzov (AZE)	1
Ion Marcu (MDA)	1
Narek Nikoghosyan (ARM)	4
Raul Caso (ITA)	7

Quarterfinals
Manuel Wagin (GER)	10
Marian Subțirică (ROU)	0
Aghanazar Novruzov (AZE)	5
Raul Caso (ITA)	0

Semifinals
Manuel Wagin (GER)	2
Aghanazar Novruzov (AZE)	4

Bottom half

Qualification

Round of 16
Nikita Dmitrijevs Mayeuski (UWW)	0
Luka Chkhitunidze (GEO)	11
Ismail Khaniev (UWW)	13
Daniel Korkin (ISR)	1
Bohdan Oliinyk (UKR)	6
İsmet Çiftçi (TUR)	4
Muhamed Bektemirov (AUT)	10
Egzon Xhoni (KOS)	0

Quarterfinals
Luka Chkhitunidze (GEO)	0
Ismail Khaniev (UWW)	11
Bohdan Oliinyk (UKR)	9
Muhamed Bektemirov (AUT)	5

Semifinals
Ismail Khaniev (UWW)	10
Bohdan Oliinyk (UKR)	0

Repechage round 2
Ion Marcu (MDA)	4
Raul Caso (ITA)	1
Daniel Korkin (ISR)	0
Luka Chkhitunidze (GEO)	10

Bronze medal match
Ion Marcu (MDA)	11
Manuel Wagin (GER)	4
Luka Chkhitunidze (GEO)	2
Bohdan Oliinyk (UKR)	1

==== Men's freestyle 79 kg ====
Final

Final
Arsen Balaian (UWW)	5
Farid Jabbarov (AZE)	1

Top half

Qualification
Andrija Ivanović (SRB)	4
Aliaksandr Viarbitski (UWW)	12

Round of 16
Aykan Seid (BUL)	0
Arsen Balaian (UWW)	10
Aliaksandr Viarbitski (UWW)	2
Gregor Eigenbrodt (GER)	2
Bohdan Oleksiienko (UKR)	11
Altin GanCi (ALB)	0
Mateusz Pędzicki (POL)	9
Metehan Yaprak (TUR)	12^{F}

Quarterfinals
Arsen Balaian (UWW)	13
Aliaksandr Viarbitski (UWW)	0
Bohdan Oleksiienko (UKR)	0
Metehan Yaprak (TUR)	10

Semifinals
Arsen Balaian (UWW)	2
Metehan Yaprak (TUR)	1

Bottom half

Round of 16
Adam Kakhriev (FRA)	0
Umar Mavlaev (SUI)	5

Quarterfinals
Raffaele Matrullo (ITA)	9
Bogdan Djandigov (BEL)	8
Farid Jabbarov (AZE)	8
Giorgi Gogritchiani (GEO)	4
Rolan Ardashev (GRE)	0
Umar Mavlaev (SUI)	10
Ádám Gazdag (HUN)	2
Marius Retco (MDA)	12

Semifinals
Raffaele Matrullo (ITA)	0
Farid Jabbarov (AZE)	10
Umar Mavlaev (SUI)	4
Marius Retco (MDA)	2

Final
Farid Jabbarov (AZE)	3
Umar Mavlaev (SUI)	1

Repechage round 2
Aykan Seid (BUL)	7
Aliaksandr Viarbitski (UWW)	1
Giorgi Gogritchiani (GEO)	12
Raffaele Matrullo (ITA)	1

Bronze medal match
Aykan Seid (BUL)	0
Metehan Yaprak (TUR)	11
Giorgi Gogritchiani (GEO)	7
Umar Mavlaev (SUI)	8

==== Men's freestyle 86 kg ====
Final

Final
Arsenii Dzhioev (AZE)	9
Rakhim Magamadov (FRA)	2

Top half

Qualification
Oleksandr Mamrosh (UKR)	1
Eugeniu Mihalcean (MDA)	6

Round of 16
Arsenii Dzhioev (AZE)	10
Razmik Yepremyan (ARM)	0
Eugeniu Mihalcean (MDA)	10
Ibrahim Sula (ALB)	0
Gabriel Iglesias (ESP)	3
Wiktor Hasa (POL)	2
Radomir Stoyanov (BUL)	6
Paulius Leščauskas (LTU)	3

Quarterfinals
Arsenii Dzhioev (AZE)	6
Eugeniu Mihalcean (MDA)	4
Gabriel Iglesias (ESP)	0
Radomir Stoyanov (BUL)	10

Semifinals
Arsenii Dzhioev (AZE)	4^{F}
Radomir Stoyanov (BUL)	2

Bottom half

Qualification
Alperen Atar (TUR)	10
Zétény Gangl (HUN)	0
Arslan Bagaev (UWW)	11
Lukas Lins (AUT)	0

Round of 16
Georgios Kotanidis (GRE)	4
Miko Elkala (FIN)	10
Alperen Atar (TUR)	4
Rakhim Magamadov (FRA)	8
Umar Veliev (BEL)	0
Arslan Bagaev (UWW)	11
Kyrylo Ohar (ISR)	0
Tornike Samkharadze (GEO)	10^{F}

Quarterfinals
Miko Elkala (FIN)	0
Rakhim Magamadov (FRA)	11
Arslan Bagaev (UWW)	10
Tornike Samkharadze (GEO)	0

Semifinals
Rakhim Magamadov (FRA)	6
Arslan Bagaev (UWW)	0

Repechage round 2
Razmik Yepremyan (ARM)	0
Eugeniu Mihalcean (MDA)	4^{F}
Alperen Atar (TUR)	3
Miko Elkala (FIN)	0

Bronze medal match
Eugeniu Mihalcean (MDA)	7
Radomir Stoyanov (BUL)	2
Alperen Atar (TUR)	4
Arslan Bagaev (UWW)	7

==== Men's freestyle 92 kg ====
Main bracket

Round of 16
Anton Ihnatsiuk (UWW)	6
Daniel Fischer (GER)	5^{R}
Alperen Tokgöz (TUR)	1
Adlan Viskhanov (FRA)	8
Denys Sahaliuk (UKR)	11
David Jakšík (SVK)	0
Sandro Kurashvili (GEO)	4^{F}
Ion Demian (MDA)	0
Mukhamed-Takhir Khaniev (UWW)	10
Filip Szucki (POL)	0
Albin Peposhi (ALB)	2^{F}
Davide Cossu (ITA)	5
Redjep Hajdari (MKD)	4
Sadig Mustafazade (AZE)	9

Quarterfinals
Knyaz Iboyan (ARM)	10
Anton Ihnatsiuk (UWW)	0
Adlan Viskhanov (FRA)	1
Denys Sahaliuk (UKR)	6
Sandro Kurashvili (GEO)	0
Mukhamed-Takhir Khaniev (UWW)	10
Albin Peposhi (ALB)	0
Sadig Mustafazade (AZE)	10

Semifinals
Knyaz Iboyan (ARM)	10
Denys Sahaliuk (UKR)	0
Mukhamed-Takhir Khaniev (UWW)	12
Sadig Mustafazade (AZE)	1

Final
Knyaz Iboyan (ARM)	1
Mukhamed-Takhir Khaniev (UWW)	12

Repechage round
Filip Szucki (POL)	7
Sandro Kurashvili (GEO)	11

Bronze medal match
Anton Ihnatsiuk (UWW)	0
Denys Sahaliuk (UKR)	10
Sandro Kurashvili (GEO)	3
Sadig Mustafazade (AZE)	5

==== Men's freestyle 97 kg ====
Main bracket

Round of 16
Resul Güne (TUR)	8
Nikita Goubarets (ISR)	1
Bady-Maadyr Samdan (UWW)	10
Nikola Petrov (BUL)	0
Constantin Buza (MDA)	1
Adam Jakšík (SVK)	3
Abduljalil Shabanov (AZE)	3
Sergey Sargsyan (ARM)	11
Uladzislau Kazlou (UWW)	4
Nikolaos Karavanos (GRE)	1
Merab Suleimanishvili (GEO)	4
David Mchedlidze (UKR)	6

Quarterfinals
Florin Tripon (ROU)	1
Resul Güne (TUR)	7
Bady-Maadyr Samdan (UWW)	12
Adam Jakšík (SVK)	1
Sergey Sargsyan (ARM)	0
Uladzislau Kazlou (UWW)	12^{F}
David Mchedlidze (UKR)	3
Taron Shahinyan (POL)	1

Semifinals
Resul Güne (TUR)	6
Bady-Maadyr Samdan (UWW)	6^{F}
Uladzislau Kazlou (UWW)	2
David Mchedlidze (UKR)	0

Final
Bady-Maadyr Samdan (UWW)	1
Uladzislau Kazlou (UWW)	2

Repechage round
Nikola Petrov (BUL)	0
Adam Jakšík (SVK)	10
Nikolaos Karavanos (GRE)	12^{F}
Sergey Sargsyan (ARM)	8

Bronze medal match
Adam Jakšík (SVK)	0
Resul Güne (TUR)	4^{F}
Nikolaos Karavanos (GRE)	1
David Mchedlidze (UKR)	6

==== Men's freestyle 125 kg ====
Main bracket

Round of 16
Giga Shavadze (GEO)	14
Dmitrii Dușcov (MDA)	6
Georgi Ivanov (BUL)	5
Artem Pukhovskii (UWW)	1

Quarterfinals
Khachatur Khachatryan (ARM)	11
Giga Shavadze (GEO)	0
Michał Dubowski (POL)	0
Volodymyr Kochanov (UKR)	10
Efe Anıl Al (TUR)	12
Pavel Dziatlau (UWW)	3
Georgi Ivanov (BUL)	4
Yusif Dursunov (AZE)	0

Semifinals
Khachatur Khachatryan (ARM)	0
Volodymyr Kochanov (UKR)	10
Efe Anıl Al (TUR)	1
Georgi Ivanov (BUL)	12^{F}

Final
Volodymyr Kochanov (UKR)	0
Georgi Ivanov (BUL)	11

Repechage round
Artem Pukhovskii (UWW)	2
Yusif Dursunov (AZE)	4

Bronze medal match
Michał Dubowski (POL)	0
Khachatur Khachatryan (ARM)	10
Yusif Dursunov (AZE)	10^{F}
Efe Anıl Al (TUR)	3

=== Men's Greco-Roman ===
==== Men's Greco-Roman 55 kg ====
Main bracket

Round of 16
Arayik Topalyan (ARM)	0
Koba Karumidze (GEO)	10
Alibek Amirov (UWW)	8
Vasileios Papageorgiou (GRE)	0
Elmir Aliyev (AZE)	9
Maxim Sarmanov (MDA)	1

Quarterfinals
Péter Tótok (HUN)	0
Koba Karumidze (GEO)	8
Mehmet Sarp (TUR)	9
Danylo Korieiev (UKR)	0
Filip Bartošík (CZE)	0
Alibek Amirov (UWW)	8
Elmir Aliyev (AZE)	11
Andi Muça (ALB)	2

Semifinals
Koba Karumidze (GEO)	9
Mehmet Sarp (TUR)	0
Alibek Amirov (UWW)	2
Elmir Aliyev (AZE)	2

Final
Koba Karumidze (GEO)	0
Alibek Amirov (UWW)	8

Repechage round
Arayik Topalyan (ARM)	7
Péter Tótok (HUN)	5
Vasileios Papageorgiou (GRE)	1
Filip Bartošík (CZE)	2

Bronze medal match
Arayik Topalyan (ARM)	10
Mehmet Sarp (TUR)	1
Filip Bartošík (CZE)	0
Elmir Aliyev (AZE)	8

==== Men's Greco-Roman 60 kg ====
Final

Final
Melkamu Fetene (ISR)	0
Dimitri Khachidze (GEO)	9

Top half

Qualification
Georgios Papageorgiou (GRE)	0
Papik Dzhavadian (UWW)	9

Round of 16
Melkamu Fetene (ISR)	4
Olivier Skrzypczak (POL)	0
Papik Dzhavadian (UWW)	6
Georgios Scarpello (GER)	3
Mikel Troplini (ALB)	0
Suren Aghajanyan (ARM)	8
Alyosha Iliev (BUL)	0
Lucas Lo Grasso (FRA)	6

Quarterfinals
Melkamu Fetene (ISR)	6
Papik Dzhavadian (UWW)	2
Suren Aghajanyan (ARM)	7
Lucas Lo Grasso (FRA)	1

Semifinals
Melkamu Fetene (ISR)	7
Suren Aghajanyan (ARM)	5

Bottom half

Qualification

Round of 16
Tommaso Bosi (ITA)	0
Bohdan Hryshyn (UKR)	8
Denis Mihai (ROU)	5
Petro Zhytovoz (HUN)	4^{F}
Mert İlbars (TUR)	6
Huseyn Garibov (AZE)	4
Dimitri Khachidze (GEO)	9
Brian Kurt Santiago (DEN)	0

Quarterfinals
Bohdan Hryshyn (UKR)	7
Petro Zhytovoz (HUN)	3^{R}
Mert İlbars (TUR)	3
Dimitri Khachidze (GEO)	4^{F}

Semifinals
Bohdan Hryshyn (UKR)	0
Dimitri Khachidze (GEO)	10

Repechage round
Olivier Skrzypczak (POL)	6
Papik Dzhavadian (UWW)	10
Brian Kurt Santiago (DEN)	0
Mert İlbars (TUR)	9

Bronze medal match
Papik Dzhavadian (UWW)	9
Suren Aghajanyan (ARM)	3
Mert İlbars (TUR)	5
Bohdan Hryshyn (UKR)	0

==== Men's Greco-Roman 63 kg ====
Main bracket

Round of 16
Vsevolod Sapun (UKR)	1
Diego Esteche (ESP)	2
Adrian Anton (ROU)	1
Marios Kapantais (GRE)	4
Alexander Vafai (SWE)	1
Ziya Babashov (AZE)	3
Davit Jotyan (ARM)	1
Vitalie Eriomenco (MDA)	4
Aleksandr Andreev (UWW)	10
Dániel Rafael (HUN)	1
Ergi Uku (ALB)	0
Romeo Beridze (GEO)	11
Furkan Erken (TUR)	7
Mairbek Salimov (POL)	4

Quarterfinals
Miroslav Emilov (BUL)	9
Diego Esteche (ESP)	0
Marios Kapantais (GRE)	2
Ziya Babashov (AZE)	10
Vitalie Eriomenco (MDA)	8
Aleksandr Andreev (UWW)	0
Romeo Beridze (GEO)	8
Furkan Erken (TUR)	2

Semifinals
Miroslav Emilov (BUL)	0
Ziya Babashov (AZE)	8
Vitalie Eriomenco (MDA)	6
Romeo Beridze (GEO)	3

Final
Ziya Babashov (AZE)	1
Vitalie Eriomenco (MDA)	3

Repechage round
Alexander Vafai (SWE)	8
Marios Kapantais (GRE)	0
Davit Jotyan (ARM)	4
Aleksandr Andreev (UWW)	0

Bronze medal match
Alexander Vafai (SWE)	5
Miroslav Emilov (BUL)	2
Davit Jotyan (ARM)	2
Romeo Beridze (GEO)	8

==== Men's Greco-Roman 67 kg ====
Final

Final
Hleb Makaranka (UWW)	1
Anri Khozrevanidze (GEO)	3

Top half

Qualification
Adomas Grigaliūnas (LTU)	0
Nestori Mannila (FIN)	8
Antonio Hristov (BUL)	2^{F}
Ruben Miranyan (ARM)	5

Round of 16
Farid Khalilov (AZE)	6
Janis Heinzelbecker (GER)	0
Nestori Mannila (FIN)	0
Daniial Agaev (UWW)	9
Attila Józsa (HUN)	5
Antonio Hristov (BUL)	4
Bredi Slinkers (NED)	0
Hleb Makaranka (UWW)	8

Quarterfinals
Farid Khalilov (AZE)	1
Daniial Agaev (UWW)	5
Attila Józsa (HUN)	2
Hleb Makaranka (UWW)	6

Semifinals
Daniial Agaev (UWW)	5
Hleb Makaranka (UWW)	5

Bottom half

Qualification
Azat Sarıyar (TUR)	9
Pavel Denisenco (MDA)	0
Anri Khozrevanidze (GEO)	7
Ardit Zeneli (ALB)	1

Round of 16
Yanis Nifri (FRA)	9
Noe Poč (SRB)	1
Azat Sarıyar (TUR)	3
William Reenberg (DEN)	1
Andrea Setti (ITA)	2
Anri Khozrevanidze (GEO)	5
Pavlo Sorokoliet (UKR)	4
Arslanbek Salimov (POL)	5

Quarterfinals
Yanis Nifri (FRA)	1
Azat Sarıyar (TUR)	6
Anri Khozrevanidze (GEO)	6
Arslanbek Salimov (POL)	4

Semifinals
Azat Sarıyar (TUR)	5
Anri Khozrevanidze (GEO)	6

Repechage round 1
Ardit Zeneli (ALB)	4
Andrea Setti (ITA)	1

Repechage round 2
Bredi Slinkers (NED)	9
Attila Józsa (HUN)	0
Ardit Zeneli (ALB)	0
Arslanbek Salimov (POL)	10

Bronze medals
Bredi Slinkers (NED)	0
Daniial Agaev (UWW)	9
Arslanbek Salimov (POL)	3
Azat Sarıyar (TUR)	5

==== Men's Greco-Roman 72 kg ====
Main bracket

Round of 16
Eren Ülkü (TUR)	2
Ashot Khachatryan (ARM)	6
Luka Ivančić (CRO)	0
Oleh Khalilov (UKR)	10
Artur Jeremejev (EST)	0
Rokas Čepauskas (LTU)	11
Ruslan Nurullayev (AZE)	10
Dimitar Georgiev (BUL)	1
Danil Grigorev (UWW)	2
Dalgat Magomedov (CZE)	0
Anri Tavartkiladze (GEO)	1
Arionas Kolitsopoulos (GRE)	4
Vasile Zabica (MDA)	7^{F}
Mikita Murashka (UWW)	2
Piotr Stolarczyk (POL)	10
Xhorxh Frrokaj (ALB)	0

Quarterfinals
Ashot Khachatryan (ARM)	3
Oleh Khalilov (UKR)	6
Rokas Čepauskas (LTU)	1
Ruslan Nurullayev (AZE)	3
Danil Grigorev (UWW)	3
Arionas Kolitsopoulos (GRE)	0
Vasile Zabica (MDA)	7
Piotr Stolarczyk (POL)	4

Semifinals
Oleh Khalilov (UKR)	2
Ruslan Nurullayev (AZE)	4
Danil Grigorev (UWW)	8
Vasile Zabica (MDA)	7

Final
Ruslan Nurullayev (AZE)	3
Danil Grigorev (UWW)	2

Repechage round
Dimitar Georgiev (BUL)	2
Rokas Čepauskas (LTU)	5
Dalgat Magomedov (CZE)	4
Arionas Kolitsopoulos (GRE)	6

Bronze medal match
Rokas Čepauskas (LTU)	1
Oleh Khalilov (UKR)	5
Arionas Kolitsopoulos (GRE)	7
Vasile Zabica (MDA)	2

==== Men's Greco-Roman 77 kg ====
Main bracket

Round of 16
Klodjan Shehu (ALB)	0
Hugo Baff (SWE)	10
Müslim Barga (TUR)	1
Evgenii Baidusov (UWW)	6^{F}
Alexandrin Guțu (MDA)	9
Temuri Orjonikidze (GEO)	1
Benjamin Hansen (NOR)	0
Vladyslav Ivanina (UKR)	2
Albert Doev (BUL)	5
Aaron Bellscheidt (GER)	9
Andreas Vasilakopoulos (GRE)	0
Khasay Hasanli (AZE)	9
Martik Petrosyan (ARM)	4
Illia Valeuski (UWW)	9
Júnior Benítez (ESP)	1
Michal Zelenka (CZE)	5

Quarterfinals
Hugo Baff (SWE)	0
Evgenii Baidusov (UWW)	7
Alexandrin Guțu (MDA)	8
Vladyslav Ivanina (UKR)	0
Aaron Bellscheidt (GER)	7
Khasay Hasanli (AZE)	3
Illia Valeuski (UWW)	0
Michal Zelenka (CZE)	2

Semifinals
Evgenii Baidusov (UWW)	9
Alexandrin Guțu (MDA)	0
Aaron Bellscheidt (GER)	5
Michal Zelenka (CZE)	5

Final
Evgenii Baidusov (UWW)	8
Aaron Bellscheidt (GER)	0

Repechage round
Müslim Barga (TUR)	5
Hugo Baff (SWE)	5
Albert Doev (BUL)	3
Khasay Hasanli (AZE)	7

Bronze medal match
Hugo Baff (SWE)	1
Alexandrin Guțu (MDA)	5
Khasay Hasanli (AZE)	9
Michal Zelenka (CZE)	1

==== Men's Greco-Roman 82 kg ====
Final

Final
Alexandru Solovei (MDA)	3
Gamzat Gadzhiev (UWW)	1

Top half

Qualification
Xhord Gjoni (ALB)	0
Ibrahim Tabaev (BEL)	12
Leon Rivalta (ITA)	4
Erik Ter-Matevosyan (ARM)	3
Dominik Botos (HUN)	8
Marek Vrba (CZE)	1

Round of 16
Jonni Sarkkinen (FIN)	1
Yüksel Sarıçiçek (TUR)	1
Ibrahim Tabaev (BEL)	0
Alexandru Solovei (MDA)	10
Alexander Johansson (SWE)	7
Leon Rivalta (ITA)	3
Dominik Botos (HUN)	2
Elmin Aliyev (AZE)	5

Quarterfinals
Jonni Sarkkinen (FIN)	1
Alexandru Solovei (MDA)	5
Alexander Johansson (SWE)	5
Elmin Aliyev (AZE)	6

Semifinals
Alexandru Solovei (MDA)	8
Elmin Aliyev (AZE)	0

Bottom half

Qualification
Ludvig Gunheim-Hatland (NOR)	0
Frederik Mathiesen (DEN)	9
Ramazan Pashaiev (UKR)	9
Oskar Lubera (POL)	0
Data Chkhaidze (GEO)	7^{F}
Vasile Cojoc (ROU)	1

Round of 16
Ekke Leitham (EST)	1
Frederik Mathiesen (DEN)	9
Ramazan Pashaiev (UKR)	9
Uroš Lečić (SRB)	0
Dzmitry Bonka (UWW)	2
Data Chkhaidze (GEO)	3
Martin Shishekov (BUL)	0
Gamzat Gadzhiev (UWW)	11

Quarterfinals
Frederik Mathiesen (DEN)	2
Ramazan Pashaiev (UKR)	1
Data Chkhaidze (GEO)	3
Gamzat Gadzhiev (UWW)	8^{F}

Semifinals
Frederik Mathiesen (DEN)	1
Gamzat Gadzhiev (UWW)	7

Repechage round 2
Ibrahim Tabaev (BEL)	0
Jonni Sarkkinen (FIN)	6
Martin Shishekov (BUL)	1
Data Chkhaidze (GEO)	4

Bronze medal match
Jonni Sarkkinen (FIN)	4
Elmin Aliyev (AZE)	1
Data Chkhaidze (GEO)	4
Frederik Mathiesen (DEN)	12

==== Men's Greco-Roman 87 kg ====
Main bracket

Round of 16
Zurab Meladze (GEO)	2
Hamza Sertcanli (SWE)	3
Miloš Perović (SRB)	0
Vladimeri Karchaidze (FRA)	8
Joju Samadov (AZE)	0
Vigen Nazaryan (ARM)	7
Baskhan Saidov (UWW)	9
Andrey Atanasov (BUL)	0
Alperen Berber (TUR)	1
Patrik Gordan (ROU)	1
Jesper Härkänen (FIN)	1
Ivan Chmyr (UKR)	5

Quarterfinals
Evangelos Boukis (GRE)	1
Hamza Sertcanli (SWE)	3
Vladimeri Karchaidze (FRA)	7
Vigen Nazaryan (ARM)	3
Baskhan Saidov (UWW)	1
Alperen Berber (TUR)	6
Ivan Chmyr (UKR)	5
Gabriel Lupașco (MDA)	2

Semifinals
Hamza Sertcanli (SWE)	0^{R}
Vladimeri Karchaidze (FRA)	3
Alperen Berber (TUR)	4
Ivan Chmyr (UKR)	1

Final
Vladimeri Karchaidze (FRA)	1
Alperen Berber (TUR)	3^{F}

Repechage round
Miloš Perović (SRB)	0
Vigen Nazaryan (ARM)	10
Patrik Gordan (ROU)	0
Baskhan Saidov (UWW)	7^{F}

Bronze medal match
Vigen Nazaryan (ARM)	WO
Hamza Sertcanli (SWE)
Baskhan Saidov (UWW)	3
Ivan Chmyr (UKR)	1

==== Men's Greco-Roman 97 kg ====
Main bracket

Round of 16
Abubakar Khaslakhanau (UWW)	3
Yehor Yakushenko (UKR)	7
Aapo Viitala (FIN)	0
Tomislav Brkan (CRO)	5^{F}
Roman Balchivschii (MDA)	1
Muhittin Helvacı (TUR)	1
Agil Musaev (AZE)	1
Harutyun Kirakosyan (ARM)	4^{F}
Richard Karelson (EST)	1
Luka Katić (SRB)	1
~~Julijan Shehu (ALB)~~
Ionuţ Goşa (ROU)	WO
Mukhammad Evloev (UWW)	12
Connor Sammet (GER)	1
Luka Gabisonia (GEO)	5
Sebastian Warchoł (POL)	1

Quarterfinals
Yehor Yakushenko (UKR)	5
Tomislav Brkan (CRO)	1
Muhittin Helvacı (TUR)	3
Harutyun Kirakosyan (ARM)	1
Richard Karelson (EST)	3
Ionuţ Goşa (ROU)	1
Mukhammad Evloev (UWW)	1
Luka Gabisonia (GEO)	7

Semifinals
Yehor Yakushenko (UKR)	5
Muhittin Helvacı (TUR)	2
Richard Karelson (EST)	9
Luka Gabisonia (GEO)	0

Final
Yehor Yakushenko (UKR)	4
Richard Karelson (EST)	1

Repechage round
Abubakar Khaslakhanau (UWW)	8
Tomislav Brkan (CRO)	0
Luka Katić (SRB)	5
Ionuţ Goşa (ROU)	1

Bronze medal match
Abubakar Khaslakhanau (UWW)	7^{F}
Muhittin Helvacı (TUR)	0
Luka Katić (SRB)	0
Luka Gabisonia (GEO)	9

==== Men's Greco-Roman 130 kg ====
Main bracket

Round of 16
Aykhan Mardanov (AZE)	0
Artur Sarkisjan (CZE)	2
Rigers Kurti (ALB)	0
Cemal Yusuf Bakır (TUR)	8
Georgios Christoforidis (GRE)	1
Mykhailo Vyshnyvetskyi (UKR)	5^{F}
Alan Dzabiev (BUL)	1
Koppány László (HUN)	2

Quarterfinals
Magomed Alichuev (UWW)	10
Artur Sarkisjan (CZE)	3
Cemal Yusuf Bakır (TUR)	10
Eerik Pank (EST)	0
Razmik Kurdyan (ARM)	0
Mykhailo Vyshnyvetskyi (UKR)	2
Koppány László (HUN)	1
Saba Chilashvili (GEO)	1

Semifinals
Magomed Alichuev (UWW)	3
Cemal Yusuf Bakır (TUR)	1
Mykhailo Vyshnyvetskyi (UKR)	1
Saba Chilashvili (GEO)	1^{R}

Final
Magomed Alichuev (UWW)	0
Mykhailo Vyshnyvetskyi (UKR)	8

Repechage round
Georgios Christoforidis (GRE)	0
Razmik Kurdyan (ARM)	9

Bronze medal match
Artur Sarkisjan (CZE)	3
Cemal Yusuf Bakır (TUR)	8
Razmik Kurdyan (ARM)	1
Saba Chilashvili (GEO)	1

== See also ==
- 2025 European U23 Wrestling Championships – Women's freestyle
