= Köhnəqala =

- Municipality
- Location within Azerbaijan
- Coordinates: 40°52′40″N 45°45′17″E
- Country: Azerbaijan
- Rayon: Tovuz

Population
  - Total: 1,589
- Time zone: UTC+4 (AZT)
  - Summer (DST): UTC+5 (AZT)

Köhnəqala (also, Kegna-Kala) is a village and municipality in the Tovuz Rayon of Azerbaijan. It has a population of 1,589.
