= 2022 European U20 Wrestling Championships =

2022 European Juniors Championships
- Host city: Rome, Italy
- Dates: 27 June – 3 July 2022
- Stadium: PalaPellicone

Champions
- Freestyle: Georgia
- Greco-Roman: Georgia
- Women: Ukraine

The 2022 European Juniors Wrestling Championships was held in Rome, Italy between 27 June to 3 July 2022.

== Competition schedule ==
All times are (UTC+2)

Date	Time	Event
27 June	11.00-15.00	Qualification rounds GR – 55-63-77-87-130 kg
27 June	18:00-19.30	Semi Final GR – 55-63-77-87-130 kg
28 June	11.00-15.00	Qualification rounds GR – 60-67-72-82-97 kg; Repechage GR – 48-55-65-80-110 kg
28 June	16.45-17.45	Semi Final GR – 60-67-72-82-97 kg
28 June	18.00-20.00	Finals GR – 55-63-77-87-130 kg
29 June	11.00-14.00	Qualification rounds WW – 50-55-59-68-76 kg; Repechage GR – 60-67-72-82-97 kg
29 June	17.00-17.45	Semi Final WW – 50-55-59-68-76 kg
29 June	18.00-20.00	Finals GR – 60-67-72-82-97 kg
30 June	11.00-13.30	Qualification rounds WW – 53-57-62-65-72 kg; Repechage WW – 50-55-59-68-76 kg
30 June	17.00-17.45	Semi Final WW – 53-57-62-65-72 kg
30 June	18.00-20.00	Finals WW – 50-55-59-68-76 kg
1 July	11.00-14.30	Qualification rounds FS – 57-65-70-79-97 kg; Repechage WW – 53-57-62-65-72 kg
1 July	17.00-17.45	Semi-finals: FS – 57-65-70-79-97 kg
1 July	18.00-20.00	Finals WW – 53-57-62-65-72 kg
2 July	11.00-14.30	Qualification rounds FS – 61-74-86-92-125 kg; Repechage FS – 57-65-70-79-97 kg
2 July	16.45-17.45	Semi Final FS – 61-74-86-92-125 kg
2 July	18.00-21.00	Finals FS – 57-65-70-79-97 kg
3 July	16.30-17.45	Repechage FS – 61-74-86-92-125 kg
3 July	18.00-20.30	Finals FS – 61-74-86-92-125 kg
3 July	21.00	Final banquet

== Medal table ==
* Host nation (Italy)

Rank	Nation	Gold	Silver	Bronze	Total
1	Ukraine	6	2	8	16
2	Azerbaijan	5	1	6	12
3	Armenia	4	2	3	9
4	Georgia	3	6	4	13
5	Turkey	3	3	11	17
6	Moldova	2	3	3	8
7	Hungary	2	2	1	5
8	Germany	1	2	4	7
9	France	1	1	2	4
9	Italy	1	1	2	4
11	Bulgaria	1	0	3	4
12	Estonia	1	0	0	1
13	Romania	0	2	4	6
14	Poland	0	2	3	5
15	Belgium	0	2	0	2
16	Finland	0	1	0	1
17	Sweden	0	0	3	3
18	Croatia	0	0	1	1
18	Greece	0	0	1	1
18	Israel	0	0	1	1
Totals (20 entries)		30	30	60	120

== Team ranking ==
Rank	Men's freestyle		Men's Greco-Roman		Women's freestyle	
Rank	Team	Points	Team	Points	Team	Points
1	Georgia	169	Georgia	141	Ukraine	169
2	Armenia	144	Turkey	118	Turkey	151
3	Ukraine	118	Ukraine	103	Germany	117
4	Turkey	107	Azerbaijan	102	Poland	102
5	Moldova	97	Armenia	97	Azerbaijan	92

== Medal overview ==
=== Men's freestyle ===
Event	Gold	Silver	Bronze
57 kg	Simone Piroddu; Italy	Harutyun Hovhannisyan; Armenia	Ahmet Karavuş; Turkey
57 kg	Simone Piroddu; Italy	Harutyun Hovhannisyan; Armenia	Luka Gvinjilia; Georgia
61 kg	Daviti Abdaladze; Georgia	Khamzat Arsamerzouev; France	Ramik Heybetov; Azerbaijan
61 kg	Daviti Abdaladze; Georgia	Khamzat Arsamerzouev; France	Hayk Abrahamyan; Armenia
65 kg	Mykyta Zubal; Ukraine	Ayub Musaev; Belgium	Luka Janezashvili; Georgia
65 kg	Mykyta Zubal; Ukraine	Ayub Musaev; Belgium	Constantin Chirilov; Moldova
70 kg	Hayk Papikyan; Armenia	Muhammad Abdurachmanov; Belgium	Raul Caso; Italy
70 kg	Hayk Papikyan; Armenia	Muhammad Abdurachmanov; Belgium	Pavel Andrușca; Moldova
74 kg	Dzhabrail Gadzhiev; Azerbaijan	Gheorghe Cara; Moldova	Muhammed Ozmuş; Turkey
74 kg	Dzhabrail Gadzhiev; Azerbaijan	Gheorghe Cara; Moldova	Vadym Tsurkan; Ukraine
79 kg	Mushegh Mkrtchyan; Armenia	Otari Adeishvili; Georgia	Sabuhi Amiraslanov; Azerbaijan
79 kg	Mushegh Mkrtchyan; Armenia	Otari Adeishvili; Georgia	Radomir Stoyanov; Bulgaria
86 kg	Rakhim Magamadov; France	Daviti Koguashvili; Georgia	Fatih Altunbaş; Turkey
86 kg	Rakhim Magamadov; France	Daviti Koguashvili; Georgia	Nazar Dod; Ukraine
92 kg	Ion Demian; Moldova	Andro Margishvili; Georgia	Denys Sahaliuk; Ukraine
92 kg	Ion Demian; Moldova	Andro Margishvili; Georgia	Adlan Viskhanov; France
97 kg	Mücahit Çelik; Turkey	Ivan Prymachenko; Ukraine	Luka Khutchua; Georgia
97 kg	Mücahit Çelik; Turkey	Ivan Prymachenko; Ukraine	Florin Tripon; Romania
125 kg	Lyova Gevorgyan; Armenia	Merab Suleimanashvili; Georgia	Adil Mısırcı; Turkey
125 kg	Lyova Gevorgyan; Armenia	Merab Suleimanashvili; Georgia	Georgi Ivanov; Bulgaria

=== Men's Greco-Roman ===
Event	Gold	Silver	Bronze
55 kg	Nihad Guluzade; Azerbaijan	Denis Mihai; Romania	Georgios Scarpello; Germany
55 kg	Nihad Guluzade; Azerbaijan	Denis Mihai; Romania	Emre Mutlu; Turkey
60 kg	Suren Aghajanyan; Armenia	Dimitri Khachidze; Georgia	Nihat Mammadli; Azerbaijan
60 kg	Suren Aghajanyan; Armenia	Dimitri Khachidze; Georgia	Melkamu Fetene; Israel
63 kg	Edmond Nazaryan; Bulgaria	Arslanbek Salimov; Poland	Azat Sarıyar; Turkey
63 kg	Edmond Nazaryan; Bulgaria	Arslanbek Salimov; Poland	Oleg Khalilov; Ukraine
67 kg	Nika Broladze; Georgia	Ashot Khachatryan; Armenia	Onur Yurtada; Turkey
67 kg	Nika Broladze; Georgia	Ashot Khachatryan; Armenia	Kanan Abdullazade; Azerbaijan
72 kg	Attila Tösmagi; Hungary	Gurban Gurbanov; Azerbaijan	Temuri Orjonikidze; Georgia
72 kg	Attila Tösmagi; Hungary	Gurban Gurbanov; Azerbaijan	Ömer Can Doğan; Turkey
77 kg	Alexandrin Guțu; Moldova	Tornike Mikeladze; Georgia	Deni Nakaev; Germany
77 kg	Alexandrin Guțu; Moldova	Tornike Mikeladze; Georgia	Yüksel Sarıçiçek; Turkey
82 kg	Achiko Bolkvadze; Georgia	Jonni Sarkkinen; Finland	Ilia Cernovol; Moldova
82 kg	Achiko Bolkvadze; Georgia	Jonni Sarkkinen; Finland	Ruslan Abdiiev; Ukraine
87 kg	Lachin Valiyev; Azerbaijan	Patrik Gordan; Romania	Vigen Nazaryan; Armenia
87 kg	Lachin Valiyev; Azerbaijan	Patrik Gordan; Romania	Nikolaos Iosifidis; Greece
97 kg	Richard Karelson; Estonia	Connor Sammet; Germany	Oktay Demir; Turkey
97 kg	Richard Karelson; Estonia	Connor Sammet; Germany	Måns Klostermann; Sweden
130 kg	Mykhailo Vyshnyvetskyi; Ukraine	Adolf Bazsó; Hungary	Dominik Krawczyk; Poland
130 kg	Mykhailo Vyshnyvetskyi; Ukraine	Adolf Bazsó; Hungary	Albert Vardanyan; Armenia

=== Women's freestyle ===
Event	Gold	Silver	Bronze
50 kg	Şevval Çayır; Turkey	Natalia Walczak; Poland	Asmar Jankurtaran; Azerbaijan
50 kg	Şevval Çayır; Turkey	Natalia Walczak; Poland	Ana Maria Pîrvu; Romania
53 kg	Amory Andrich; Germany	Mihaela Samoil; Moldova	Nataliia Klivchutska; Ukraine
53 kg	Amory Andrich; Germany	Mihaela Samoil; Moldova	Chadia Ayachi; France
55 kg	Elnura Mammadova; Azerbaijan	Tuba Demir; Turkey	Immacolata Danise; Italy
55 kg	Elnura Mammadova; Azerbaijan	Tuba Demir; Turkey	Albina Rillia; Ukraine
57 kg	Oleksandra Khomenets; Ukraine	Aurora Russo; Italy	Georgiana Lircă; Romania
57 kg	Oleksandra Khomenets; Ukraine	Aurora Russo; Italy	Melda Dernekçi; Turkey
59 kg	Yulia Leskovets; Ukraine	Ebru Dağbaşı; Turkey	Viktória Borsos; Hungary
59 kg	Yulia Leskovets; Ukraine	Ebru Dağbaşı; Turkey	Fatme Shaban; Bulgaria
62 kg	Birgul Soltanova; Azerbaijan	Luisa Scheel; Germany	Iva Gerić; Croatia
62 kg	Birgul Soltanova; Azerbaijan	Luisa Scheel; Germany	Iryna Bondar; Ukraine
65 kg	Manola Skobelska; Ukraine	Enikő Elekes; Hungary	Zofia Polowczyk; Poland
65 kg	Manola Skobelska; Ukraine	Enikő Elekes; Hungary	Nora Svensson; Sweden
68 kg	Nesrin Baş; Turkey	Luciana Beda; Moldova	Caroline Kvist; Sweden
68 kg	Nesrin Baş; Turkey	Luciana Beda; Moldova	Sophia Schäfle; Germany
72 kg	Iryna Zablotska; Ukraine	Nazar Batır; Turkey	Jennifer Rösler; Germany
72 kg	Iryna Zablotska; Ukraine	Nazar Batır; Turkey	Marziya Sadigova; Azerbaijan
76 kg	Veronika Nyikos; Hungary	Mariia Orlevych; Ukraine	Elena Margaș; Romania
76 kg	Veronika Nyikos; Hungary	Mariia Orlevych; Ukraine	Daniela Tkachuk; Poland

== Participating nations ==
467 wrestlers from 35 countries:

1. Albania (3)
2. Armenia (20)
3. Austria (5)
4. Azerbaijan (25)
5. Belgium (4)
6. Bulgaria (27)
7. Croatia (4)
8. Czech Republic (8)
9. Spain (9)
10. Estonia (7)
11. Finland (9)
12. France (15)
13. United Kingdom (1)
14. Georgia (21)
15. Germany (24)
16. Greece (15)
17. Hungary (28)
18. Israel (10)
19. Italy (27)
20. Kosovo (2)
21. Latvia (8)
22. Lithuania (13)
23. Moldova (21)
24. North Macedonia (4)
25. Netherlands (1)
26. Norway (7)
27. Poland (27)
28. Portugal (2)
29. Romania (21)
30. Serbia (11)
31. Switzerland (6)
32. Slovakia (7)
33. Sweden (13)
34. Turkey (30)
35. Ukraine (30)
- Russia and Belarus banned from attending all international wrestling competitions due to the 2022 Russian invasion of Ukraine.
