= Elmira Yasin =

Turkish freestyle wrestler (born 2006)

Personal information
- Born: 9 February 2006 (age 20) Donbas, Ukraine
- Height: 1.70 m (5 ft 7 in)
- Weight: 76 kg (168 lb; 12.0 st)

Sport
- Country: Turkey
- Sport: Women's freestyle wrestling
- Event: 76 kg
- Club: Erzincan İl Özel İdare
Medal record
Women's freestyle wrestling
Representing Turkey
Yasar Dogu Tournament
Silver medal – second place	2026 Antalya	76 kg
Dan Kolov & Nikola Petrov Tournament
Silver medal – second place	2026 Plovdiv	76 kg
U23 World Championships
Bronze medal – third place	2025 Novi Sad	76 kg
Bronze medal – third place	2026 Las Vegas	76 kg
European U23 Championships
Gold medal – first place	2025 Tirana	76 kg
World U20 Championships
Bronze medal – third place	2024 Pontevedra	76 kg
European U20 Championships
Gold medal – first place	2024 Novi Sad	76 kg
Bronze medal – third place	2025 Caorle	76 kg
World U17 Championships
Bronze medal – third place	2023 İstanbul	73 kg

Elmira Yasin (born 9 February 2006) is a Ukrainian-born Turkish freestyle wrestler competing in the 76 kg division. She is a member of Erzincan İl Özel İdare.

== Career ==
Elmira Yasin won the gold medal at the 2024 European U20 Wrestling Championships held in Novi Sad, Serbia, by defeating her opponent in the final match 10-5 against Russian Diana Titova, who participated in the tournament as an Independent Individual Athlete.

She became the champion of Turkey by defeating Melisa Sarıtaç in the women's freestyle 76 kg final match at the 2025 Turkish Wrestling Championship held in Ankara Keçiören Taha Akgül Sports Hall.

Elmira Yasin won the gold medal in the women's freestyle 76 kg category at the 2025 European U23 Wrestling Championships in Tirana, Albania, beating Bulgarian Vanesa Georgieva 7-6 in the first round, Ukrainian Mariia Orlevych 4-2 in the quarter-finals, Hungarian Veronika Nyikos 6-1 in the semi-finals and Russian Olga Kozyreva 10-5 in the final match.

== Personal life ==
Yasin is of Turkish Meskhetian origin.
