= Kristina Bratchikova =

Russian freestyle wrestler (born 2005)

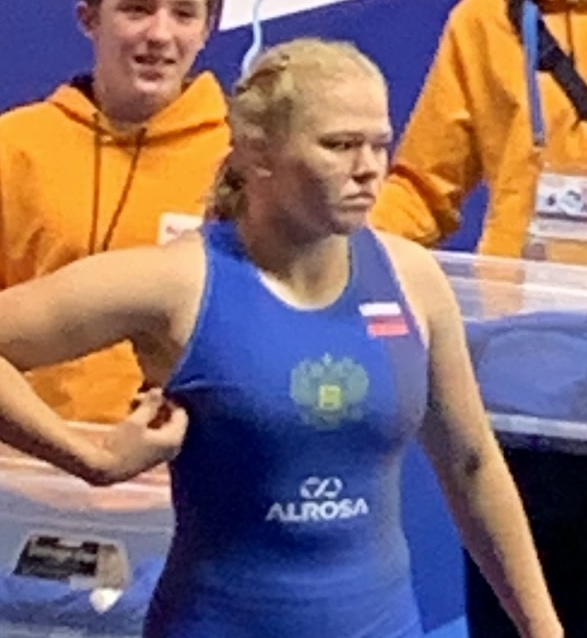

Personal information
- Native name: Кристина Братчикова
- Born: Kristina Aleksandrovna Bratchikova; 4 October 2005 (age 21) Gulkevichi, Krasnodar Krai, Russia
- Height: 1.65 m (5 ft 5 in)
- Weight: 72 kg (159 lb)

Sport
- Country: Russia
- Sport: Amateur wrestling
- Event: Freestyle wrestling
- Club: SSHOR (Gulkevichi, Krasnodar Krai); SSHOR Arktika (Noyabrsk, Yamalo-Nenets Autonomous Okrug)
- Coached by: Alina Balashova; Ruslan Paynov; Yalchin Mamedov
Medal record
Women's freestyle wrestling
Representing UWW
European Championships
Bronze medal – third place	2026 Tirana	72 kg
European U23 Championships
Gold medal – first place	2025 Tirana	72 kg
Bronze medal – third place	2026 Zrenjanin	72 kg
World Junior Championships
Bronze medal – third place	2025 Samokov	72 kg
Bronze medal – third place	2026 Bratislava	72 kg
European U20 Championships
Bronze medal – third place	2025 Caorle	72 kg

Kristina Bratchikova (Кристина Александровна Братчикова; born 4 October 2005) is a Russian freestyle wrestler. Competing in the 72 kg weight class, Bratchikova won the bronze medal at the 2026 European Wrestling Championships.

== Career ==
Bratchikova was born in Gulkevichi, Krasnodar Krai. She began freestyle wrestling at the age of six.

At the 2026 European U23 Wrestling Championships held in Zrenjanin, Serbia, she won the bronze medal in the women's freestyle 72 kg event.

At the 2026 European Wrestling Championships held in Tirana, Albania, Bratchikova won the bronze medal in the women's freestyle 72 kg event. In the bronze-medal match, she defeated Hungary's Zsuzsanna Molnár 3–0 to finish third.
