= Aurora Russo =

Italian freestyle wrestler

Personal information
- Nationality: Italian
- Born: 3 June 2003 (age 23) Turin, Italy
- Height: 1.60 m (5 ft 3 in)
- Weight: 59 kg (130 lb)

Sport
- Country: Italy
- Sport: Women's freestyle wrestling
- Weight class: 59 kg
- Club: Fiamme Oro
Medal record
Women's freestyle wrestling
Representing Italy
European Championships
Bronze medal – third place	2025 Bratislava	59 kg
Grand Prix
Silver medal – second place	2025 Sassari	59 kg
European U23 Championships
Silver medal – second place	2025 Tirana	59 kg
World Junior Championships
Gold medal – first place	2023 Amman	59 kg
Silver medal – second place	2021 Ufa	57 kg
European U20 Championships
Gold medal – first place	2023 Santiago	59 kg
Silver medal – second place	2022 Rome	57 kg

Aurora Russo (born 3 June 2003) is an Italian freestyle wrestler competing in the 59 kg weight class. She is a silver medalist at the 2024 U20 World Wrestling Championships and has represented Italy in multiple European and world-level competitions.

== Career ==
Russo began competing internationally as a teenager. In 2017, she participated in the Cadet European Wrestling Championships and helped Italy secure several medals across categories.

Her major breakthrough came in August 2023, when she reached the final of the 57 kg category at the U20 World Wrestling Championships held in Amman, Jordan. After advancing through the bracket with decisive victories, she earned the silver medal after a close loss to India’s Antim Panghal.

She also represented Italy at the 2023 European Senior Championships, where she reached the quarterfinal stage. Her strong performance contributed to Italy's growing success in women’s freestyle wrestling.

Later that year, Russo took part in the 2023 Olympic qualification events, where the Italian women’s team secured multiple licenses for Paris 2023. She competed for Italy at the 2023 Summer Olympics, finishing 15th in the women's freestyle 57 kg event.
