= 2019 European Cadets Wrestling Championships =

- Host city: Faenza, Italy
- Dates: June 17–23, 2019

Champions
- Freestyle: Russia
- Greco-Roman: Russia
- Women: Russia

The 2019 European Cadets Wrestling Championships (U17) was the 22nd edition of European Cadets Wrestling Championship of combined events, and took place from June 17 to 23 in Faenza, Italy.

== Medal table ==
Rank	Nation	Gold	Silver	Bronze	Total
1	Russia	13	6	7	26
2	Azerbaijan	4	3	8	15
3	Ukraine	3	2	6	11
4	Georgia	2	3	5	10
5	Armenia	1	3	4	8
6	Bulgaria	1	2	1	4
7	Germany	1	2	0	3
8	Italy	1	1	2	4
9	Romania	1	0	3	4
10	Hungary	1	0	0	1
10	Moldova	1	0	0	1
10	North Macedonia	1	0	0	1
13	Turkey	0	5	6	11
14	Belarus	0	2	7	9
15	Switzerland	0	1	0	1
16	Sweden	0	0	3	3
17	Poland	0	0	2	2
18	Belgium	0	0	1	1
18	Croatia	0	0	1	1
18	Denmark	0	0	1	1
18	Estonia	0	0	1	1
18	France	0	0	1	1
18	Norway	0	0	1	1
Totals (23 entries)		30	30	60	120

== Team ranking ==
Rank	Men's freestyle		Men's Greco-Roman		Women's freestyle	
Rank	Team	Points	Team	Points	Team	Points
1	Russia	190	Russia	178	Russia	220
2	Azerbaijan	153	Azerbaijan	135	Ukraine	140
3	Georgia	140	Georgia	117	Belarus	83
4	Armenia	102	Turkey	108	Germany	79
5	Ukraine	87	Armenia	95	Italy	74

== Medal overview ==
=== Men's freestyle ===
Event	Gold	Silver	Bronze
45 kg	Nikolozi Santeladze; Georgia	Murad Hagverdiev; Azerbaijan	Nikita Berazun; Belarus
45 kg	Nikolozi Santeladze; Georgia	Murad Hagverdiev; Azerbaijan	Tolga Özbek; Turkey
48 kg	Beshir Alili; North Macedonia	Luka Hovhannisyan; Armenia	Ramazan Bagavudinov; Russia
48 kg	Beshir Alili; North Macedonia	Luka Hovhannisyan; Armenia	Luka Gugeshashvili; Georgia
51 kg	Nikita Abramov; Ukraine	Giorgi Gogritchiani; Georgia	Kanan Heybatov; Azerbaijan
51 kg	Nikita Abramov; Ukraine	Giorgi Gogritchiani; Georgia	Umar Umarov; Russia
55 kg	Simone Piroddu; Italy	Muhammet Karavuş; Turkey	Ziraddin Bayramov; Azerbaijan
55 kg	Simone Piroddu; Italy	Muhammet Karavuş; Turkey	Magomed Tazhudinov; Russia
60 kg	Sabir Jafarov; Azerbaijan	Genik Asatryan; Armenia	Ayub Musaev; Belgium
60 kg	Sabir Jafarov; Azerbaijan	Genik Asatryan; Armenia	Danil Kharchilava; Russia
65 kg	Iman Shikhshabekov; Russia	Dzhabrail Gadzhiev; Azerbaijan	Narek Pogosyan; Ukraine
65 kg	Iman Shikhshabekov; Russia	Dzhabrail Gadzhiev; Azerbaijan	Davit Patsinashvili; Georgia
71 kg	Abdulkerim Abdulaev; Russia	Davit Kutchuashvili; Georgia	Menua Yaribekyan; Armenia
71 kg	Abdulkerim Abdulaev; Russia	Davit Kutchuashvili; Georgia	Muhammed Halit Ozmuş; Turkey
80 kg	Akhmedkhan Tembotov; Russia	Denys Sahaliuk; Ukraine	Davit Koguashvili; Georgia
80 kg	Akhmedkhan Tembotov; Russia	Denys Sahaliuk; Ukraine	Rakhim Magamadov; France
92 kg	Lyova Gevorgyan; Armenia	Islam Kartoev; Russia	Sagadulla Agaev; Azerbaijan
92 kg	Lyova Gevorgyan; Armenia	Islam Kartoev; Russia	Ömer Agtaş; Turkey
110 kg	Andrey Bestaev; Russia	Georgi Lyubomirov Ivanov; Bulgaria	David Mchedlidze; Georgia
110 kg	Andrey Bestaev; Russia	Georgi Lyubomirov Ivanov; Bulgaria	Hamlet Nasibli; Azerbaijan

=== Men's Greco-Roman ===
Event	Gold	Silver	Bronze
45 kg	Farid Sadikhli; Azerbaijan	Daniyal Agaev; Russia	Miroslav Emilov; Bulgaria
45 kg	Farid Sadikhli; Azerbaijan	Daniyal Agaev; Russia	Homeros Arakelyan; Armenia
48 kg	Malik Aliyev; Azerbaijan	Damir Kalakutok; Russia	Maksim Stupakevich; Belarus
48 kg	Malik Aliyev; Azerbaijan	Damir Kalakutok; Russia	Karapet Manvelyan; Armenia
51 kg	Edmond Nazaryan; Bulgaria	Barış Erbek; Turkey	Vladimir Voitovich; Ukraine
51 kg	Edmond Nazaryan; Bulgaria	Barış Erbek; Turkey	Armen Harutyunyan; Armenia
55 kg	Nihat Zahid Mammadli; Azerbaijan	Gleb Makarenko; Belarus	Dimitri Khachidze; Georgia
55 kg	Nihat Zahid Mammadli; Azerbaijan	Gleb Makarenko; Belarus	Artem Kolesnik; Russia
60 kg	Maksim Skuratov; Russia	Mert İlbars; Turkey	Nika Broladze; Georgia
60 kg	Maksim Skuratov; Russia	Mert İlbars; Turkey	Artem Klitsunov; Belarus
65 kg	Imran Babochiev; Russia	Muslim Barga; Turkey	Dmitri Bonka; Belarus
65 kg	Imran Babochiev; Russia	Muslim Barga; Turkey	Khasay Hasanli; Azerbaijan
71 kg	Alexandrin Gutu; Moldova	Data Chkhaidze; Georgia	Allakhverdi Aliev; Azerbaijan
71 kg	Alexandrin Gutu; Moldova	Data Chkhaidze; Georgia	Simon Borkenhagen; Sweden
80 kg	Vasile Daniel Cojoc; Romania	Vigen Nazaryan; Armenia	Alexander Johansson; Sweden
80 kg	Vasile Daniel Cojoc; Romania	Vigen Nazaryan; Armenia	Jonas Moller; Denmark
92 kg	Muhammad Evloev; Russia	Lachin Valiyev; Azerbaijan	Oktay Demir; Turkey
92 kg	Muhammad Evloev; Russia	Lachin Valiyev; Azerbaijan	Richard Karelson; Estonia
110 kg	Mate Gokadze; Georgia	Said Musaev; Russia	Ömer Aygül; Turkey
110 kg	Mate Gokadze; Georgia	Said Musaev; Russia	Mikhail Vishnevsky; Ukraine

=== Women's freestyle ===
Event	Gold	Silver	Bronze
40 kg	Valeria Khaidarov; Russia	Zozan Akar; Turkey	Michela Chessa; Italy
40 kg	Valeria Khaidarov; Russia	Zozan Akar; Turkey	Violetta Semchova; Ukraine
43 kg	Aida Kerimova; Ukraine	Diana Tancheva Pavlova; Bulgaria	Ana-Maria Nechifor; Romania
43 kg	Aida Kerimova; Ukraine	Diana Tancheva Pavlova; Bulgaria	Olga Rekhmetulova; Russia
46 kg	Viktoria Perevozkina; Russia	Svenja Jungo; Switzerland	Tatyana Pertsova; Belarus
46 kg	Viktoria Perevozkina; Russia	Svenja Jungo; Switzerland	Georgiana Antuca; Romania
49 kg	Rebekka March; Germany	Angelina Pervukhina; Russia	Natalia Walczak; Poland
49 kg	Rebekka March; Germany	Angelina Pervukhina; Russia	Anastasiya Yanotova; Belarus
53 kg	Viktoria Khuasainova; Russia	Amory Olivia Andrich; Germany	Alesia Hetmanava; Belarus
53 kg	Viktoria Khuasainova; Russia	Amory Olivia Andrich; Germany	Elnura Mammadova; Azerbaijan
57 kg	Amina Tandelova; Russia	Kristina Sokolovska; Ukraine	Birgul Soltanova; Azerbaijan
57 kg	Amina Tandelova; Russia	Kristina Sokolovska; Ukraine	Othelie Hoeie; Norway
61 kg	Yulia Leskovets; Ukraine	Tatyana Kabanova; Russia	Iva Gerić; Croatia
61 kg	Yulia Leskovets; Ukraine	Tatyana Kabanova; Russia	Aurora Russo; Italy
65 kg	Ekaterina Glukhareva; Russia	Veronica Braschi; Italy	Zofia Polowczyk; Poland
65 kg	Ekaterina Glukhareva; Russia	Veronica Braschi; Italy	Evgeniya Siedykh; Ukraine
69 kg	Lili Újfalvi; Hungary	Alina Maksimova; Belarus	Anastasia Kozlova; Russia
69 kg	Lili Újfalvi; Hungary	Alina Maksimova; Belarus	Paula Rotaru; Romania
73 kg	Olga Kozyreva; Russia	Jennifer Roesler; Germany	Julia Fridlund; Sweden
73 kg	Olga Kozyreva; Russia	Jennifer Roesler; Germany	Nazar Batır; Turkey
