= 2022 World Junior Wrestling Championships – Men's freestyle =

The men's freestyle competitions at the 2022 World Junior Wrestling Championships held in Sofia, Bulgaria between 17 and 20 August 2022.

== Men's freestyle ==
=== 57 kg ===
15 and 16 August

Legend

- F — Won by fall

Final

Final
Jore Volk (USA)	3
Merey Bazarbayev (KAZ)	2

Top half

Round of 32
Ahmad Javan (IRI)	5
Simone Piroddu (ITA)	0
Luka Gvinjilia (GEO)	10
Abdelrahman Mahmoud (EGY)	2

Round of 16
Azizbek Naimov (UZB)	5^{F}
Thomas Fischer (SUI)	0
Ahmad Javan (IRI)	5
Jore Volk (USA)	7
Rafał Szewc (POL)	2
Luka Gvinjilia (GEO)	11
Iukhan Dokturbek Uulu (KGZ)	6^{F}
Dmitri Carastoianov (MDA)	2

Quarterfinals
Azizbek Naimov (UZB)	2
Jore Volk (USA)	7
Luka Gvinjilia (GEO)	6
Iukhan Dokturbek Uulu (KGZ)	1

Semifinals
Jore Volk (USA)	13
Luka Gvinjilia (GEO)	6

Bottom half

Round of 32
Nuraddin Novruzov (AZE)	1
Tolga Özbek (TUR)	6
Seyfulla Itaev (FRA)	10
Ivaylo Tisov (BUL)	0

Round of 16
Heorhii Kazanzhy (UKR)	8
Harvey Ridings (GBR)	7
Tolga Özbek (TUR)	12^{F}
Harutyun Hovhannisyan (ARM)	4
Abhishek Dhaka (IND)	11
Seyfulla Itaev (FRA)	3
Merey Bazarbayev (KAZ)	10
Andreas Parotsidis (GRE)	0

Quarterfinals
Heorhii Kazanzhy (UKR)	3
Tolga Özbek (TUR)	2
Abhishek Dhaka (IND)	1
Merey Bazarbayev (KAZ)	5

Semifinals
Heorhii Kazanzhy (UKR)	4
Merey Bazarbayev (KAZ)	6

Repechage round 2
Ahmad Javan (IRI)	11
Azizbek Naimov (UZB)	0
Andreas Parotsidis (GRE)	2
Abhishek Dhaka (IND)	12

Bronze medal match
Ahmad Javan (IRI)	11
Luka Gvinjilia (GEO)	0
Abhishek Dhaka (IND)	8
Heorhii Kazanzhy (UKR)	5

=== 61 kg ===
16 and 17 August

Legend

- F — Won by fall
- WO — Won by walkover

Final

Final
Yuto Nishiuchi (JPN)	5
Armin Habibzadeh (IRI)	3

Top half

Round of 32
~~Akseli Erkkola (FIN)~~
Jeyhun Allahverdiyev (AZE)	WO
Daniel Kulczyński (POL)	0
Maiis Aliyev (KAZ)	10
Diego Olvera (MEX)	0
Mohit Kumar (IND)	10

Round of 16
Hayk Abrahamyan (ARM)	1
Yuto Nishiuchi (JPN)	6
Jeyhun Allahverdiyev (AZE)	10
Mika Lehmkuhl (RSA)	0
Fatlum Braka (KOS)	0
Maiis Aliyev (KAZ)	3^{F}
Mohit Kumar (IND)	12
Aden Sakybaev (KGZ)	2

Quarterfinals
Yuto Nishiuchi (JPN)	8
Jeyhun Allahverdiyev (AZE)	0
Maiis Aliyev (KAZ)	4
Mohit Kumar (IND)	10

Semifinals
Yuto Nishiuchi (JPN)	16
Mohit Kumar (IND)	8

Bottom half

Round of 32
Nic Bouzakis (USA)	4^{F}
Arslan Rakhimov (UZB)	6
Shehabeldin Mohamed (EGY)	WO
~~Ilyas Abdurashidov (BEL)~~

Round of 16
Armin Habibzadeh (IRI)	11
Mykyta Abramov (UKR)	0
Nic Bouzakis (USA)	4^{F}
Abdullah Toprak (TUR)	4
Khamzat Arsamerzouev (FRA)	10
Shehabeldin Mohamed (EGY)	0
Daviti Abdaladze (GEO)	10
Dimitrios Oflidis (GRE)	0

Quarterfinals
Armin Habibzadeh (IRI)	13
Nic Bouzakis (USA)	11
Khamzat Arsamerzouev (FRA)	9
Daviti Abdaladze (GEO)	2

Semifinals
Armin Habibzadeh (IRI)	3
Khamzat Arsamerzouev (FRA)	0

Repechage round 2
Hayk Abrahamyan (ARM)	1
Jeyhun Allahverdiyev (AZE)	3
Mykyta Abramov (UKR)	16
Nic Bouzakis (USA)	15

Bronze medal match
Jeyhun Allahverdiyev (AZE)	0
Mohit Kumar (IND)	7
Mykyta Abramov (UKR)	3
Khamzat Arsamerzouev (FRA)	5

=== 65 kg ===
15 and 16 August

Legend

- F — Won by fall
- R — Retired

Final

Final
Umidjon Jalolov (UZB)	5
Ziraddin Bayramov (AZE)	1^{R}

Top half

Round of 32
Olzhas Olzhakanov (KAZ)	0
Vince Cornella (USA)	8
Artur Sardaryan (ARM)	3
Yoshinosuke Aoyagi (JPN)	13
Myrza Zhyrgalbek Uulu (KGZ)	2
Umidjon Jalolov (UZB)	10

Round of 16
Muhamed Bektemirov (AUT)	3
Mohammad Shakeri (IRI)	14
Vince Cornella (USA)	10
Ismail Pomakov (BUL)	0
Hamza Zopalı (TUR)	12
Yoshinosuke Aoyagi (JPN)	19
Umidjon Jalolov (UZB)	10
Matías Muñoz (CHI)	0

Quarterfinals
Mohammad Shakeri (IRI)	5
Vince Cornella (USA)	6
Yoshinosuke Aoyagi (JPN)	0
Umidjon Jalolov (UZB)	10

Semifinals
Vince Cornella (USA)	0
Umidjon Jalolov (UZB)	4

Bottom half

Round of 32
Egzon Xhoni (KOS)	2
Doru Dincă (ROU)	15
Abderrahmane Benaissa (ALG)	0
Ziraddin Bayramov (AZE)	4^{F}
Jonnathan Pérez (GUA)	0
Sujeet Kalkal (IND)	6^{F}

Round of 16
Mykyta Zubal (UKR)	10
Doru Dincă (ROU)	0
Ziraddin Bayramov (AZE)	15
Yehia Hafez (EGY)	4
Pavel Graur (MDA)	0
Sujeet Kalkal (IND)	11
Ayub Musaev (BEL)	6
Luka Janezashvili (GEO)	4

Quarterfinals
Mykyta Zubal (UKR)	0
Ziraddin Bayramov (AZE)	10
Sujeet Kalkal (IND)	11
Ayub Musaev (BEL)	0

Semifinals
Ziraddin Bayramov (AZE)	6
Sujeet Kalkal (IND)	2

Repechage round 1
Myrza Zhyrgalbek Uulu (KGZ)	4^{F}
Matías Muñoz (CHI)	0
Abderrahmane Benaissa (ALG)	0
Yehia Hafez (EGY)	10

Repechage round 2
Myrza Zhyrgalbek Uulu (KGZ)	1
Yoshinosuke Aoyagi (JPN)	11
Yehia Hafez (EGY)	3
Mykyta Zubal (UKR)	11

Bronze medal match
Yoshinosuke Aoyagi (JPN)	6
Vince Cornella (USA)	6
Mykyta Zubal (UKR)	1
Sujeet Kalkal (IND)	12

=== 70 kg ===
15 and 16 August

Legend

- F — Won by fall

Final

Final
Mitchell Mesenbrink (USA)	7
Kanan Heybatov (AZE)	13

Top half

Round of 32
Stone Lewis (CAN)	8
Pavel Andrușca (MDA)	9
Begijon Kuldashev (UZB)	1
Hossein Mohammad Aghaei (IRI)	3
Muhammad Abdurachmanov (BEL)	0
Mitchell Mesenbrink (USA)	12

Round of 16
Harun Söyler (TUR)	10
Rodion Anchugin (KAZ)	0
Pavel Andrușca (MDA)	3
Hayk Papikyan (ARM)	7
Marcell Nagy (HUN)	4
Hossein Mohammad Aghaei (IRI)	14
Mitchell Mesenbrink (USA)	10
Kanat Kerimbekov (KGZ)	0

Quarterfinals
Harun Söyler (TUR)	2
Hayk Papikyan (ARM)	8
Hossein Mohammad Aghaei (IRI)	7
Mitchell Mesenbrink (USA)	9

Semifinals
Hayk Papikyan (ARM)	3
Mitchell Mesenbrink (USA)	6

Bottom half

Round of 32
Saad Bouguerra (ALG)	20
Alexandru Matea (ROU)	9
Kanan Heybatov (AZE)	8
Gigi Kurkhuli (GEO)	2
Ivan Semenov (UKR)	0
Mulayam Yadav (IND)	7

Round of 16
Benedikt Huber (AUT)	11
Saad Bouguerra (ALG)	1
Kanan Heybatov (AZE)	5
Raul Caso (ITA)	1
Ivan Stoyanov (BUL)	0
Mulayam Yadav (IND)	11
Kota Takahashi (JPN)	10
Mustafo Akhmedov (TJK)	8

Quarterfinals
Benedikt Huber (AUT)	0
Kanan Heybatov (AZE)	10
Mulayam Yadav (IND)	4
Kota Takahashi (JPN)	1

Semifinals
Kanan Heybatov (AZE)	5
Mulayam Yadav (IND)	3

Repechage round 1
Muhammad Abdurachmanov (BEL)	6
Kanat Kerimbekov (KGZ)	6
Gigi Kurkhuli (GEO)	9
Raul Caso (ITA)	4

Repechage round 2
Kanat Kerimbekov (KGZ)	2
Hossein Mohammad Aghaei (IRI)	12
Gigi Kurkhuli (GEO)	10
Benedikt Huber (AUT)	2

Bronze medal match
Hossein Mohammad Aghaei (IRI)	5
Hayk Papikyan (ARM)	2
Gigi Kurkhuli (GEO)	2
Mulayam Yadav (IND)	12

=== 74 kg ===
16 and 17 August

Legend

- F — Won by fall

Final

Final
Ryunosuke Kamiya (JPN)	0
Dzhabrail Gadzhiev (AZE)	4^{F}

Top half

Round of 32
Okan Tahtacı (TUR)	10
Bálint Nemes (HUN)	0
Umar Mavlaev (SUI)	12
Arno van Zijl (RSA)	0
Iliyas Yerbolatov (KAZ)	5^{F}
Petar Petkov (BUL)	0

Round of 16
Erfan Elahi (IRI)	5
Alex Facundo (USA)	4
Okan Tahtacı (TUR)	2
Sagar Jaglan (IND)	13
Gheorghi Cara (MDA)	8
Umar Mavlaev (SUI)	4
Iliyas Yerbolatov (KAZ)	2
Ryunosuke Kamiya (JPN)	3

Quarterfinals
Erfan Elahi (IRI)	5
Sagar Jaglan (IND)	10
Gheorghi Cara (MDA)	8
Ryunosuke Kamiya (JPN)	12

Semifinals
Sagar Jaglan (IND)	2
Ryunosuke Kamiya (JPN)	9

Bottom half

Round of 32
Jafar Chuliboyev (UZB)	16
Krisztian Biro (ROU)	6
Dzhabrail Gadzhiev (AZE)	13
Ulukbek Asilbekov (KGZ)	0
Amaan Gulacha (CAN)	5
Luca Finizio (ITA)	3

Round of 16
Batsükhiin Batbayar (MGL)	4
Jafar Chuliboyev (UZB)	6
Dzhabrail Gadzhiev (AZE)	10
Kamil Barlowski (POL)	0
Luka Chkhitunidze (GEO)	7^{F}
Amaan Gulacha (CAN)	0
Tymur Hudyma (UKR)	9
Menua Yaribekyan (ARM)	8

Quarterfinals
Jafar Chuliboyev (UZB)	0
Dzhabrail Gadzhiev (AZE)	10
Luka Chkhitunidze (GEO)	7
Tymur Hudyma (UKR)	6

Semifinals
Dzhabrail Gadzhiev (AZE)	5
Luka Chkhitunidze (GEO)	2

Repechage round 1
Ulukbek Asilbekov (KGZ)	8
Kamil Barlowski (POL)	3

Repechage round 2
Iliyas Yerbolatov (KAZ)	17
Gheorghi Cara (MDA)	10
Ulukbek Asilbekov (KGZ)	2
Jafar Chuliboyev (UZB)	12

Bronze medal match
Iliyas Yerbolatov (KAZ)	0
Sagar Jaglan (IND)	10
Jafar Chuliboyev (UZB)	11
Luka Chkhitunidze (GEO)	0

=== 79 kg ===
15 and 16 August

Legend

- F — Won by fall

Final

Final
Sobhan Yari (IRI)	5
Mushegh Mkrtchyan (ARM)	0

Top half

Round of 32
Shamsat Tair (KAZ)	9
Mateusz Pędzick (POL)	4

Round of 16
Otari Adeishvili (GEO)	13
Gabriel Iglesias (ESP)	0
Shamsat Tair (KAZ)	10
Daisuke Shimizu (JPN)	0
Marais Hattingh (RSA)	0
Bekir Öveç (TUR)	10
Sobhan Yari (IRI)	6
Brayden Thompson (USA)	1

Quarterfinals
Otari Adeishvili (GEO)	13
Shamsat Tair (KAZ)	8
Bekir Öveç (TUR)	0
Sobhan Yari (IRI)	8

Semifinals
Otari Adeishvili (GEO)	6
Sobhan Yari (IRI)	9

Bottom half

Round of 32
Oleksandr Mamrosh (UKR)	4
Mukhammad Abdullaev (KGZ)	9^{F}
Soslan Tigiyev (AZE)	10
Deepak Nehra (IND)	2

Round of 16
Miko Elkala (FIN)	1
Radomir Stoyanov (BUL)	10
Mukhammad Abdullaev (KGZ)	10
Connor Church (CAN)	0
Marian Subțirică (ROU)	3
Soslan Tigiyev (AZE)	13
Mushegh Mkrtchyan (ARM)	9
Kimi Käppeli (SUI)	0

Quarterfinals
Radomir Stoyanov (BUL)	0
Mukhammad Abdullaev (KGZ)	11
Soslan Tigiyev (AZE)	2
Mushegh Mkrtchyan (ARM)	11^{F}

Semifinals
Mukhammad Abdullaev (KGZ)	2
Mushegh Mkrtchyan (ARM)	2

Repechage round 2
Brayden Thompson (USA)	1
Bekir Öveç (TUR)	2
Kimi Käppeli (SUI)	0
Soslan Tigiyev (AZE)	10

Bronze medal match
Bekir Öveç (TUR)	4
Otari Adeishvili (GEO)	10
Soslan Tigiyev (AZE)	10
Mukhammad Abdullaev (KGZ)	18

=== 86 kg ===
16 and 17 August

Legend

- F — Won by fall
- WO — Won by walkover

Final

Final
Rakhim Magamadov (FRA)	10
Bennett Berge (USA)	5

Top half

Round of 32
Jointy Kumar (IND)	5
Sabuhi Amiraslanov (AZE)	7

Round of 16
Naadambatyn Batbilgüün (MGL)	10
Gabriele Niccolini (ITA)	0
Sabuhi Amiraslanov (AZE)	6
Muslim Zhaksylyk (KAZ)	2
Angelos Kouklaris (GRE)	0
Rakhim Magamadov (FRA)	11
Zhulien Ivanov (BUL)	0
Aref Ranjbari (IRI)	11

Quarterfinals
Naadambatyn Batbilgüün (MGL)	7
Sabuhi Amiraslanov (AZE)	17
Rakhim Magamadov (FRA)	10
Aref Ranjbari (IRI)	0

Semifinals
Sabuhi Amiraslanov (AZE)	2
Rakhim Magamadov (FRA)	11

Bottom half

Round of 32
César Ubico (GUA)	0
İsmail Küçüksolak (TUR)	10
Gurgen Simonyan (ARM)	0
Bennett Berge (USA)	10

Round of 16
Lilian Balan (MDA)	0
Daviti Koguashvil (GEO)	10
İsmail Küçüksolak (TUR)	10^{F}
Kim Pu-reun (KOR)	0
Nándor Hajduch (HUN)	2
Bennett Berge (USA)	12
Nazar Dod (UKR)	9
Mukhammadzair Palvanov (KGZ)	4

Quarterfinals
Daviti Koguashvil (GEO)	5
İsmail Küçüksolak (TUR)	6
Bennett Berge (USA)	10
Nazar Dod (UKR)	0

Semifinals
İsmail Küçüksolak (TUR)	7
Bennett Berge (USA)	9

Repechage round 1
Gurgen Simonyan (ARM)
Nándor Hajduch (HUN)	WO

Repechage round 2
Angelos Kouklaris (GRE)	0
Aref Ranjbari (IRI)	3
Nándor Hajduch (HUN)	3
Nazar Dod (UKR)	14

Bronze medal match
Aref Ranjbari (IRI)	3
Sabuhi Amiraslanov (AZE)	1
Nazar Dod (UKR)	1
İsmail Küçüksolak (TUR)	11

=== 92 kg ===
16 and 17 August

Legend

- F — Won by fall

Final

Final
Andro Margishvili (GEO)	0
Amir Hossein Firouzpour (IRI)	11

Top half

Round of 32
Yıldıray Pala (TUR)	3
Sergey Sargsyan (ARM)	8

Round of 16
Juan Iturriza (MEX)	7
Suray Rufad (BUL)	6
Sergey Sargsyan (ARM)	10
Ravshanbek Jumaboev (UZB)	0
Andro Margishvili (GEO)	12
Kiril Kildau (GER)	2
Jaxon Smith (USA)	8
Ion Demian (MDA)	1

Quarterfinals
Juan Iturriza (MEX)	1
Sergey Sargsyan (ARM)	11
Andro Margishvili (GEO)	12
Jaxon Smith (USA)	2

Semifinals
Sergey Sargsyan (ARM)	3
Andro Margishvili (GEO)	4

Bottom half

Round of 32
Nurdaulet Bekenov (KAZ)	3
Gkivi Bliatze (GRE)	10
Krisztián Angyal (HUN)	10
Cha Seo-hyun (KOR)	0

Round of 16
Akash (IND)	4
Adlan Viskhanov (FRA)	7
Gkivi Bliatze (GRE)	3
Denys Sahaliuk (UKR)	2
Kutman Tolobaldiev (KGZ)	12
Krisztián Angyal (HUN)	15
Satoshi Miura (JPN)	0
Amir Hossein Firouzpour (IRI)	10

Quarterfinals
Adlan Viskhanov (FRA)	4
Gkivi Bliatze (GRE)	3
Krisztián Angyal (HUN)	0
Amir Hossein Firouzpour (IRI)	10

Semifinals
Adlan Viskhanov (FRA)	0
Amir Hossein Firouzpour (IRI)	10

Repechage round 2
Kiril Kildau (GER)	0
Jaxon Smith (USA)	10
Satoshi Miura (JPN)	4
Krisztián Angyal (HUN)	2^{F}

Bronze medal match
Jaxon Smith (USA)	2
Sergey Sargsyan (ARM)	12
Krisztián Angyal (HUN)	0
Adlan Viskhanov (FRA)	11

=== 97 kg ===
15 and 16 August

Legend

- F — Won by fall

Main bracket

Round of 16
Sali Saliev (BUL)	15^{F}
Mohamed Salaheldin (EGY)	13
Ben Kueter (USA)	10
Dmitrii Dușcov (MDA)	0
Park Joo-bin (KOR)	0
Neeraj Bhardwaj (IND)	11
David Mchedlidze (UKR)	10
Vilius Mikalauskas (LTU)	3
Khachatur Khachatryan (ARM)	0
Rıfat Gıdak (TUR)	6
Amir Ali Azarpira (IRI)	11
Toyoki Hamada (JPN)	0
Florin Tripon (ROU)	3
Zelimkhan Mussikhanov (KAZ)	4

Quarterfinals
Luka Khutchua (GEO)	11
Sali Saliev (BUL)	0
Ben Kueter (USA)	8
Neeraj Bhardwaj (IND)	1
David Mchedlidze (UKR)	2
Rıfat Gıdak (TUR)	5
Amir Ali Azarpira (IRI)	10
Zelimkhan Mussikhanov (KAZ)	0

Semifinals
Luka Khutchua (GEO)	14
Ben Kueter (USA)	17
Rıfat Gıdak (TUR)	6
Amir Ali Azarpira (IRI)	4

Final
Ben Kueter (USA)	10^{F}
Rıfat Gıdak (TUR)	2

Repechage round
Dmitrii Dușcov (MDA)	0
Neeraj Bhardwaj (IND)	10
Khachatur Khachatryan (ARM)	0
David Mchedlidze (UKR)	11

Bronze medal match
Neeraj Bhardwaj (IND)	18
Luka Khutchua (GEO)	10
David Mchedlidze (UKR)	1
Amir Ali Azarpira (IRI)	5

=== 125 kg ===
16 and 17 August

Legend

- F — Won by fall

Main bracket

Round of 16
Merab Suleimanishvili (GEO)	13
Lyova Gevorgyan (ARM)	11
Georgi Ivanov (BUL)	8
Ryusei Fujita (JPN)	2
Adil Mısırcı (TUR)	5
Bekzat Tazhi (KAZ)	0
Volodymyr Kochanov (UKR)	10
Namoz Abdurashidov (UZB)	13

Quarterfinals
Amir Reza Masoumi (IRI)	14
Merab Suleimanishvili (GEO)	4
Georgi Ivanov (BUL)	2
Nicholas Feldman (USA)	6
Mahendra Gaikwad (IND)	6
Adil Mısırcı (TUR)	4
Namoz Abdurashidov (UZB)	9
Roger Li (CAN)	3

Semifinals
Amir Reza Masoumi (IRI)	11
Nicholas Feldman (USA)	1
Mahendra Gaikwad (IND)	6
Namoz Abdurashidov (UZB)	0

Final
Amir Reza Masoumi (IRI)	13
Mahendra Gaikwad (IND)	2

Bronze medal match
Merab Suleimanishvili (GEO)	7^{F}
Nicholas Feldman (USA)	8
Adil Mısırcı (TUR)	4
Namoz Abdurashidov (UZB)	0

== See also ==
- 2022 World Junior Wrestling Championships – Men's Greco-Roman
- 2022 World Junior Wrestling Championships – Women's freestyle
