= 2022 World Junior Wrestling Championships – Women's freestyle =

The women's freestyle competitions at the 2022 World Junior Wrestling Championships was held in Sofia, Bulgaria between 17 and 19 August 2022.

== Women's freestyle ==
=== 50 kg ===
17 and 18 August

Legend

- F — Won by fall

Main bracket

Round of 16
Priyanshi Prajapat (IND)	8
Laura Ganikyzy (KAZ)	0
Emine Osman (BUL)	0
Aida Kerymova (UKR)	10
Mönkhbatyn Mönkhgerel (MGL)	0
Umi Ito (JPN)	10
Şevval Çayır (TUR)	10
Karolína Müllerová (CZE)	0
Gultakin Shirinova (AZE)	2
Audrey Jimenez (USA)	13
Gabija Dilytė (LTU)	5
Ana Maria Pîrvu (ROU)	3
Natalia Walczak (POL)	4
Lin Yung-hsun (TPE)	4
Serena Di Benedetto (CAN)	10
Ellen Östman (SWE)	6

Quarterfinals
Priyanshi Prajapat (IND)	9
Aida Kerymova (UKR)	7
Umi Ito (JPN)	15
Şevval Çayır (TUR)	4
Audrey Jimenez (USA)	11
Gabija Dilytė (LTU)	0
Natalia Walczak (POL)	2^{F}
Serena Di Benedetto (CAN)	0

Semifinals
Priyanshi Prajapat (IND)	0
Umi Ito (JPN)	10
Audrey Jimenez (USA)	2^{F}
Natalia Walczak (POL)	4

Final
Umi Ito (JPN)	10
Audrey Jimenez (USA)	0

Repechage round
Mönkhbatyn Mönkhgerel (MGL)	11
Şevval Çayır (TUR)	8
Gultakin Shirinova (AZE)	7
Gabija Dilytė (LTU)	2

Bronze medal match
Mönkhbatyn Mönkhgerel (MGL)	4
Priyanshi Prajapat (IND)	12^{F}
Gultakin Shirinova (AZE)	10
Natalia Walczak (POL)	0

=== 53 kg ===
18 and 19 August

Legend

- F — Won by fall

Main bracket

Round of 16
Vivien Matyi (HUN)	0
Mihaela Samoil (MDA)	10
Nataliia Klivchutska (UKR)	11
Aruuke Kadyrbek Kyzy (KGZ)	0
Asmar Jankurtaran (AZE)	7
Ayaka Kimura (JPN)	8^{F}
Amory Andrich (GER)	0
Antim Panghal (IND)	11
Shaimaa Atef Mohamed (EGY)	6^{F}
Dilshoda Matnazarova (UZB)	0
Chadia Ayachi (FRA)	5
Patricia Iuraşcu (ROU)	5
Nazife Tair (BUL)	1
Altyn Shagayeva (KAZ)	9
Katie Gomez (USA)	10
Emine Çakmak (TUR)	0

Quarterfinals
Mihaela Samoil (MDA)	0
Nataliia Klivchutska (UKR)	4
Ayaka Kimura (JPN)	0
Antim Panghal (IND)	4^{F}
Shaimaa Atef Mohamed (EGY)	9
Chadia Ayachi (FRA)	6
Altyn Shagayeva (KAZ)	5^{F}
Katie Gomez (USA)	2

Semifinals
Nataliia Klivchutska (UKR)	2
Antim Panghal (IND)	11
Shaimaa Atef Mohamed (EGY)	1
Altyn Shagayeva (KAZ)	7^{F}

Final
Antim Panghal (IND)	8
Altyn Shagayeva (KAZ)	0

Repechage round
Amory Andrich (GER)	0
Ayaka Kimura (JPN)	10
Nazife Tair (BUL)	2
Katie Gomez (USA)	13

Bronze medal match
Ayaka Kimura (JPN)	6
Nataliia Klivchutska (UKR)	4
Katie Gomez (USA)	12
Shaimaa Atef Mohamed (EGY)	2

=== 55 kg ===
17 and 18 August

Legend

- F — Won by fall

Main bracket

Round of 16
Robbie Ann Pingal (CAN)	0
Róza Szenttamási (HUN)	12
Antonia Valdés (CHI)	1
Sarbinaz Jienbaeva (UZB)	4
Moe Kiyooka (JPN)	5^{F}
Liao Pei-ying (TPE)	0
Tuba Demir (TUR)	4
Immacolata Danise (ITA)	2
Ainur Ashimova (KAZ)	2
Manju (IND)	14

Quarterfinals
Adriana Dorado-Marin (USA)	2
Róza Szenttamási (HUN)	12
Sarbinaz Jienbaeva (UZB)	0
Moe Kiyooka (JPN)	11
Albina Rillia (UKR)	4^{F}
Tuba Demir (TUR)	0
Manju (IND)	7
Georgiana Lircă (ROU)	0

Semifinals
Róza Szenttamási (HUN)	2
Moe Kiyooka (JPN)	12
Albina Rillia (UKR)	8^{F}
Manju (IND)	7

Final
Moe Kiyooka (JPN)	10
Albina Rillia (UKR)	0

Repechage round
Liao Pei-ying (TPE)	6
Sarbinaz Jienbaeva (UZB)	1

Bronze medal match
Liao Pei-ying (TPE)	0
Róza Szenttamási (HUN)	4^{F}
Tuba Demir (TUR)	13
Manju (IND)	2

=== 57 kg ===
18 and 19 August

Legend

- F — Won by fall

Main bracket

Round of 16
Oleksandra Khomenets (UKR)	2^{F}
Othelie Høie (NOR)	0
Ruka Natami (JPN)	12
Gabriela Cross (CAN)	0
Adrienn Béres (HUN)	0
Zeinep Bayanova (KAZ)	10
Céleste Sion (FRA)	6
Anna Michalcová (CZE)	2
Sezim Zhumanazarova (KGZ)	17
Bertha Rojas (MEX)	14
Melda Dernekçi (TUR)	14
Julia Nowicka (POL)	3
Ana Maria Puiu (ROU)	0
Aurora Russo (ITA)	10
Sofia Macaluso (USA)	6^{F}
Sito (IND)	4

Quarterfinals
Oleksandra Khomenets (UKR)	4
Ruka Natami (JPN)	8
Zeinep Bayanova (KAZ)	10
Céleste Sion (FRA)	2
Sezim Zhumanazarova (KGZ)	2
Melda Dernekçi (TUR)	6
Aurora Russo (ITA)	4
Sofia Macaluso (USA)	8^{F}

Semifinals
Ruka Natami (JPN)	7
Zeinep Bayanova (KAZ)	1
Melda Dernekçi (TUR)	3
Sofia Macaluso (USA)	12^{F}

Final
Ruka Natami (JPN)	6
Sofia Macaluso (USA)	1

Repechage round
Gabriela Cross (CAN)	0
Oleksandra Khomenets (UKR)	10
Sito (IND)	12
Aurora Russo (ITA)	10

Bronze medal match
Oleksandra Khomenets (UKR)	12
Zeinep Bayanova (KAZ)	2
Sito (IND)	11
Melda Dernekçi (TUR)	5

=== 59 kg ===
17 and 18 August

Legend

- F — Won by fall

Main bracket

Round of 16
Kara le Roux (RSA)	0
Ebru Dağbaşı (TUR)	4^{F}
Sakura Motoki (JPN)	6^{F}
Yulia Leskovets (UKR)	0
Fatme Shaban (BUL)	4
Hedda Kvåle (NOR)	7
Aleksandra Witos (POL)	3
Viktória Borsos (HUN)	4

Quarterfinals
Savannah Cosme (USA)	1
Ebru Dağbaşı (TUR)	1
Sakura Motoki (JPN)	2^{F}
Bhagyashree Fand (IND)	0
Madina Aman (KAZ)	12
Hedda Kvåle (NOR)	2
Viktória Borsos (HUN)	3
Mia Friesen (CAN)	1

Semifinals
Ebru Dağbaşı (TUR)	2
Sakura Motoki (JPN)	2
Madina Aman (KAZ)	6
Viktória Borsos (HUN)	7

Final
Sakura Motoki (JPN)	4^{F}
Viktória Borsos (HUN)	0

Repechage round
Yulia Leskovets (UKR)	5
Bhagyashree Fand (IND)	8
Aleksandra Witos (POL)	4
Mia Friesen (CAN)	1

Bronze medal match
Bhagyashree Fand (IND)	1
Ebru Dağbaşı (TUR)	3
Aleksandra Witos (POL)	1
Madina Aman (KAZ)	4

=== 62 kg ===
18 and 19 August

Legend

- F — Won by fall

Final

Final
Sonam Malik (IND)	0
Nonoka Ozaki (JPN)	6^{F}

Top half

Round of 32
Bermet Nuridin Kyzy (KGZ)	4^{F}
Lo Yu-lin (TPE)	0

Round of 16
Rushana Abdirasulova (UZB)	10^{F}
Angelina Ellis-Toddington (CAN)	4
Bermet Nuridin Kyzy (KGZ)	4
Büşra Efe (TUR)	3
Tynys Dubek (KAZ)	0
Sonam Malik (IND)	10
Adaugo Nwachukwu (USA)	8^{F}
Iris Thiébaux (FRA)	0

Quarterfinals
Rushana Abdirasulova (UZB)	2
Bermet Nuridin Kyzy (KGZ)	6^{F}
Sonam Malik (IND)	5
Adaugo Nwachukwu (USA)	5

Semifinals
Bermet Nuridin Kyzy (KGZ)	0
Sonam Malik (IND)	8^{F}

Bottom half

Round of 32
Mastoura Soudani (ALG)	12
Luisa Scheel (GER)	0
Nonoka Ozaki (JPN)	5
Iryna Bondar (UKR)	0

Round of 16
Bianca Contrafatto (ITA)	3
Yasmine Soliman (HUN)	10
Mastoura Soudani (ALG)	0
Birgul Soltanova (AZE)	8^{F}
Viktoria Øverby (NOR)	0
Nonoka Ozaki (JPN)	6^{F}
Wiktoria Staneta (POL)	1
Mima Taneva (BUL)	1

Quarterfinals
Yasmine Soliman (HUN)	2
Birgul Soltanova (AZE)	11
Nonoka Ozaki (JPN)	10
Wiktoria Staneta (POL)	0

Semifinals
Birgul Soltanova (AZE)	0
Nonoka Ozaki (JPN)	10

Repechage round 1
Iryna Bondar (UKR)	10
Viktoria Øverby (NOR)	0

Repechage round 2
Tynys Dubek (KAZ)	0
Adaugo Nwachukwu (USA)	4^{F}
Iryna Bondar (UKR)	11
Wiktoria Staneta (POL)	0

Bronze medal match
Adaugo Nwachukwu (USA)	10
Bermet Nuridin Kyzy (KGZ)	0
Iryna Bondar (UKR)	9
Birgul Soltanova (AZE)	1

=== 65 kg ===
18 and 19 August

Legend

- F — Won by fall

Main bracket

Round of 16
Valentina Kozhuharova (BUL)	0
Dilnaz Sazanova (KGZ)	4^{F}
Manola Skobelska (UKR)	7
Korlan Amanova (KAZ)	0
Gulmira Aitmuratova (UZB)	0
Priyanka (IND)	12
Marziya Sadigova (AZE)	0
Derya Nur Karaduman (TUR)	4^{F}
Mahiro Yoshitake (JPN)	8
Enikő Elekes (HUN)	2
Reese Larramendy (USA)	12
Zofia Polowczyk (POL)	2
Khadija Jlassi (TUN)	11
Veronica Braschi (ITA)	0
Altansükhiin Davaajargal (MGL)	5
Nora Svensson (SWE)	5

Quarterfinals
Dilnaz Sazanova (KGZ)	6
Manola Skobelska (UKR)	5
Priyanka (IND)	8^{F}
Derya Nur Karaduman (TUR)	1
Mahiro Yoshitake (JPN)	10
Reese Larramendy (USA)	0
Khadija Jlassi (TUN)	3
Nora Svensson (SWE)	2

Semifinals
Dilnaz Sazanova (KGZ)	0
Priyanka (IND)	5^{F}
Mahiro Yoshitake (JPN)	10
Khadija Jlassi (TUN)	0

Final
Priyanka (IND)	0
Mahiro Yoshitake (JPN)	8

Repechage round
Gulmira Aitmuratova (UZB)	10
Derya Nur Karaduman (TUR)	0
Enikő Elekes (HUN)	9
Reese Larramendy (USA)	10

Bronze medal match
Gulmira Aitmuratova (UZB)	2
Dilnaz Sazanova (KGZ)	12
Reese Larramendy (USA)	2
Khadija Jlassi (TUN)	9

=== 68 kg ===
17 and 18 August

Legend

- F — Won by fall

Main bracket

Round of 16
Ami Ishii (JPN)	8^{F}
Nigar Mirzazada (AZE)	0
Arju (IND)	8^{F}
Nikoleta Barmpa (GRE)	0
Zhibekzhan Sabyrzhanova (KAZ)	0
Patrycja Słomska (POL)	11
Menatalla Badran (EGY)	0
Nesrin Baş (TUR)	5^{F}
Nurzat Nurtaeva (KGZ)	10
Luciana Beda (MDA)	0
Laura Godino (ITA)	12
Destiny Rodriguez (USA)	1
Caroline Kvist (SWE)	0
Firuza Esenbaeva (UZB)	11
Daniela Brasnarova (BUL)	0
Sophia Schäfle (GER)	10

Quarterfinals
Ami Ishii (JPN)	10
Arju (IND)	0
Patrycja Słomska (POL)	0
Nesrin Baş (TUR)	10
Nurzat Nurtaeva (KGZ)	12
Laura Godino (ITA)	2
Firuza Esenbaeva (UZB)	7
Sophia Schäfle (GER)	7

Semifinals
Ami Ishii (JPN)	3
Nesrin Baş (TUR)	1
Nurzat Nurtaeva (KGZ)	6
Sophia Schäfle (GER)	3

Final
Ami Ishii (JPN)	4^{F}
Nurzat Nurtaeva (KGZ)	0

Repechage round
Nigar Mirzazada (AZE)	4
Arju (IND)	14
Luciana Beda (MDA)	12
Laura Godino (ITA)	2

Bronze medal match
Arju (IND)	4
Nesrin Baş (TUR)	6
Luciana Beda (MDA)	1
Sophia Schäfle (GER)	5

=== 72 kg ===
18 and 19 August

Legend

- F — Won by fall

Main bracket

Round of 16
Vanesa Georgieva (BUL)	8
Jennifer Rösler (GER)	3
Patrycja Cuber (POL)	0
Nazar Batır (TUR)	7
Hung Ping-tsen (TPE)	4
Nyla Burgess (CAN)	6
Zaineb Sghaier (TUN)	0
Amit Elor (USA)	9^{F}

Quarterfinals
Anastassiya Panassovich (KAZ)	7
Vanesa Georgieva (BUL)	3
Nazar Batır (TUR)	3
Sumire Niikura (JPN)	4
Reetika Hooda (IND)	10
Nyla Burgess (CAN)	0
Amit Elor (USA)	10
Zsófia Virág (HUN)	0

Semifinals
Anastassiya Panassovich (KAZ)	8
Sumire Niikura (JPN)	6
Reetika Hooda (IND)	1
Amit Elor (USA)	12

Final
Anastassiya Panassovich (KAZ)	0
Amit Elor (USA)	10

Repechage round
Zaineb Sghaier (TUN)	5
Zsófia Virág (HUN)	0

Bronze medal match
Vanesa Georgieva (BUL)	1
Sumire Niikura (JPN)	4
Zaineb Sghaier (TUN)	3
Reetika Hooda (IND)	4

=== 76 kg ===
17 and 18 August

Legend

- F — Won by fall

Round of 16
Vianne Rouleau (CAN)	3
Eleni Chrysikaki (GRE)	5
Melisa Sarıtaç (TUR)	2
Laura Kühn (GER)	1
Alina Yertostik (KAZ)	0
Priya Malik (IND)	8^{F}
Elena Margaș (ROU)	0
Mariia Orlevych (UKR)	9
Ana Júlia dos Santos (BRA)	0
Tristan Kelly (USA)	9

Quarterfinals
Veronika Nyikos (HUN)	4^{F}
Eleni Chrysikaki (GRE)	0
Melisa Sarıtaç (TUR)	4
Priya Malik (IND)	6
Daniela Tkachuk (POL)	10^{F}
Mariia Orlevych (UKR)	2
Tristan Kelly (USA)	3
Ayano Moro (JPN)	6^{F}

Semifinals
Veronika Nyikos (HUN)	5
Priya Malik (IND)	6
Daniela Tkachuk (POL)	0
Ayano Moro (JPN)	10

Final
Priya Malik (IND)	1
Ayano Moro (JPN)	3

Repechage round 1
Alina Yertostik (KAZ)	7
Melisa Sarıtaç (TUR)	9

Bronze medal match
Melisa Sarıtaç (TUR)	5
Veronika Nyikos (HUN)	7
Tristan Kelly (USA)	7^{F}
Daniela Tkachuk (POL)	2

== See also ==
- 2022 World Junior Wrestling Championships – Men's freestyle
- 2022 World Junior Wrestling Championships – Men's Greco-Roman
