= 2022 World Junior Wrestling Championships – Men's Greco-Roman =

The men's Greco-Roman competitions at the 2022 World Junior Wrestling Championships was held in Sofia, Bulgaria between 19 and 21 August 2022.

== Men's Greco-Roman ==
=== 55 kg ===
19 and 20 August

Legend

- F — Won by fall

Final

Final
Denis Mihai (ROU)	1
Nihad Guluzade (AZE)	6

Top half

Round of 32
Tamazi Glonti (GEO)	11
Abdalla Mohamed Shaaban (EGY)	0

Round of 16
Seyed Arash Negahdari (IRI)	3
Denis Mihai (ROU)	4
Tamazi Glonti (GEO)	5
Vilius Adomavičius (LTU)	0
Nuristan Suiorkulov (KGZ)	7
Jonathan Gurule (USA)	2
Emre Mutlu (TUR)	6
Paolo Milkov (BUL)	2

Quarterfinals
Denis Mihai (ROU)	3
Tamazi Glonti (GEO)	0
Nuristan Suiorkulov (KGZ)	7
Emre Mutlu (TUR)	5

Semifinals
Denis Mihai (ROU)	5
Nuristan Suiorkulov (KGZ)	1

Bottom half

Round of 32

Round of 16
Iskhar Kurbayev (KAZ)	4
Anup Kumar (IND)	1
Mykola Havrychkin (UKR)	4
Karapet Manvelyan (ARM)	10
Alisher Ganiev (UZB)	1
Taiga Onishi (JPN)	3
Ilias Zairakis (GRE)	0
Nihad Guluzade (AZE)	9

Quarterfinals
Iskhar Kurbayev (KAZ)	0
Karapet Manvelyan (ARM)	8
Taiga Onishi (JPN)	0
Nihad Guluzade (AZE)	9

Semifinals
Karapet Manvelyan (ARM)	1
Nihad Guluzade (AZE)	2

Repechage round 2
Seyed Arash Negahdari (IRI)	1
Tamazi Glonti (GEO)	4
Ilias Zairakis (GRE)	0
Taiga Onishi (JPN)	8

Bronze medal match
Tamazi Glonti (GEO)	1
Nuristan Suiorkulov (KGZ)	5
Taiga Onishi (JPN)	2^{F}
Karapet Manvelyan (ARM)	0

=== 60 kg ===
20 and 21 August

Legend

- F — Won by fall

Final

Final
Saeid Esmaeili (IRI)	6
Suren Aghajanyan (ARM)	6

Top half

Round of 32
Saeid Esmaeili (IRI)	9
Maxwell Black (USA)	0

Round of 16
Volodymyr Voitovych (UKR)	9
Georgios Scarpello (GER)	0
Saeid Esmaeili (IRI)	13
Koto Gomi (JPN)	9
Nihat Mammadli (AZE)	11
Dimitri Khachidze (GEO)	0
Borislav Kirilov (BUL)	4^{F}
Zhoodar Eraaliev (KGZ)	1

Quarterfinals
Volodymyr Voitovych (UKR)	4
Saeid Esmaeili (IRI)	12
Nihat Mammadli (AZE)	8
Borislav Kirilov (BUL)	0

Semifinals
Saeid Esmaeili (IRI)	1
Nihat Mammadli (AZE)	1

Bottom half

Round of 32
Aleksandar Berarov (SRB)	0
Mert İlbars (TUR)	8

Round of 16
Su Yong-xiang (TPE)	0
Sumit Dalal (IND)	8
Melkamu Fetene (ISR)	0
Akmal Khamroev (UZB)	9
Olivier Skrzypczak (POL)	1
Mert İlbars (TUR)	10
Suren Aghajanyan (ARM)	4
Bakytzhan Kabdyl (KAZ)	0

Quarterfinals
Sumit Dalal (IND)	10
Akmal Khamroev (UZB)	1
Mert İlbars (TUR)	7
Suren Aghajanyan (ARM)	16

Semifinals
Sumit Dalal (IND)	0
Suren Aghajanyan (ARM)	5^{F}

Repechage round 1
Maxwell Black (USA)	0
Koto Gomi (JPN)	9

Repechage round 2
Koto Gomi (JPN)	9
Volodymyr Voitovych (UKR)	1
Bakytzhan Kabdyl (KAZ)	0
Mert İlbars (TUR)	8

Bronze medal match
Koto Gomi (JPN)	3
Nihat Mammadli (AZE)	3
Mert İlbars (TUR)	3
Sumit Dalal (IND)	6

=== 63 kg ===
19 and 20 August

Legend

- F — Won by fall

Final

Final
Iman Mohammadi (IRI)	6
Baiaman Karimov (KGZ)	1

Top half

Round of 32
Azat Sarıyar (TUR)	8
Umesh (IND)	1

Round of 16
Romeo Beridze (GEO)	9
Domagoj Celiček (CRO)	0
Azat Sarıyar (TUR)	0
Iman Mohammadi (IRI)	9
Haiden Drury (USA)	0
Ziya Babashov (AZE)	8
Miroslav Emilov (BUL)	8
Chiezo Maruyama (JPN)	11

Quarterfinals
Romeo Beridze (GEO)	0
Iman Mohammadi (IRI)	6
Ziya Babashov (AZE)	3
Chiezo Maruyama (JPN)	5^{F}

Semifinals
Iman Mohammadi (IRI)	4
Chiezo Maruyama (JPN)	0

Bottom half

Round of 32
Oleh Khalilov (UKR)	8
Fayssal Benfredj (ALG)	0

Round of 16
Donatas Rindeikis (LTU)	0
Arman Vardanyan (ARM)	5^{F}
Ioannis Petkos (GRE)	1
Dinislam Sagitzhan (KAZ)	9
Arslanbek Salimov (POL)	2
Oleh Khalilov (UKR)	4
Dávid Mányik (HUN)	0
Baiaman Karimov (KGZ)	8

Quarterfinals
Arman Vardanyan (ARM)	10
Dinislam Sagitzhan (KAZ)	7
Oleh Khalilov (UKR)	3
Baiaman Karimov (KGZ)	3

Semifinals
Arman Vardanyan (ARM)	2
Baiaman Karimov (KGZ)	3

Repechage round 2
Azat Sarıyar (TUR)	3
Romeo Beridze (GEO)	1
Dávid Mányik (HUN)	0
Oleh Khalilov (UKR)	8

Bronze medal match
Azat Sarıyar (TUR)	2
Chiezo Maruyama (JPN)	5
Oleh Khalilov (UKR)	5
Arman Vardanyan (ARM)	0

=== 67 kg ===
20 and 21 August

Legend

- F — Won by fall

Final

Final
Kanan Abdullazade (AZE)	4
Nika Broladze (GEO)	1

Top half

Round of 32
Ankit Gulia (IND)	4
Dinmukhamed Koshkar (KAZ)	8
Adomas Grigaliūnas (LTU)
Zsolt Takács (HUN)	WO
Shon Nadorgin (ISR)	0
Robert Perez (USA)	8
Kanan Abdullazade (AZE)	8
Alexei Hahlovschi (MDA)	3
Onur Yurtada (TUR)	4^{F}
Steve Momilia (ITA)	0
Ilyosjon Abdinazarov (UZB)	4
Néstor Almanza (CHI)	1

Round of 16
Kasper Øverby (NOR)	0
Dinmukhamed Koshkar (KAZ)	8
Zsolt Takács (HUN)	0
Robert Perez (USA)	8
Kanan Abdullazade (AZE)	9
Onur Yurtada (TUR)	7
Ilyosjon Abdinazarov (UZB)	4
Mairbek Salimov (POL)	1

Quarterfinals
Dinmukhamed Koshkar (KAZ)	3
Robert Perez (USA)	3
Kanan Abdullazade (AZE)	4
Ilyosjon Abdinazarov (UZB)	3

Semifinals
Dinmukhamed Koshkar (KAZ)	2
Kanan Abdullazade (AZE)	9

Bottom half

Round of 32
Radoslav Dimitrov (BUL)	9
Ângelo Café (BRA)	1
Abdelrahman Omar (EGY)	7
Marco Stoll (GER)	0
Danial Sohrabi (IRI)	9
Nurdos Nurkanov (KGZ)	1
Fritz Reber (SUI)	0
Nestori Mannila (FIN)	8
Iulian Lungu (ROU)	8
Marian Holubovskyi (UKR)	9^{F}
Nika Broladze (GEO)	9
Ryohma Toyota (JPN)	1

Round of 16
Yanis Nifri (FRA)	8
Radoslav Dimitrov (BUL)	3
Abdelrahman Omar (EGY)	0
Danial Sohrabi (IRI)	9
Nestori Mannila (FIN)	2
Marian Holubovskyi (UKR)	0
Nika Broladze (GEO)	11
Luka Ivančić (CRO)	0

Quarterfinals
Yanis Nifri (FRA)	0
Danial Sohrabi (IRI)	8
Nestori Mannila (FIN)	0
Nika Broladze (GEO)	8

Semifinals
Danial Sohrabi (IRI)	3
Nika Broladze (GEO)	9^{F}

Repechage round 1
Alexei Hahlovschi (MDA)	0
Onur Yurtada (TUR)	4^{F}
Ryohma Toyota (JPN)	5
Luka Ivančić (CRO)	5

Repechage round 2
Onur Yurtada (TUR)	7^{F}
Ilyosjon Abdinazarov (UZB)	0
Luka Ivančić (CRO)	0
Nestori Mannila (FIN)	8

Bronze medal match
Onur Yurtada (TUR)	2
Dinmukhamed Koshkar (KAZ)	3
Nestori Mannila (FIN)	2
Danial Sohrabi (IRI)	11

=== 72 kg ===
20 and 21 August

Legend

- F — Won by fall

Final

Final
Gurban Gurbanov (AZE)	4
Alexandru Solovei (MDA)	0

Top half

Round of 32
Júnior Benítez (ESP)	8
Niel du Toit (RSA)	0
Esli Martínez (MEX)	0
Gurban Gurbanov (AZE)	8
Aaron Bellscheidt (GER)	12
Haithem Issaad (ALG)	4
Irfan Mirzoiev (UKR)	10
Alibek Berdiev (KGZ)	1
Emad Ghaly (EGY)	8
Rokas Čepauskas (LTU)	2
Deepak Punia (IND)	4
Georgios Barbanos (SWE)	4
Matthias Hauthaler (AUT)	0
Richard Fedalen (USA)	8^{F}

Round of 16
Igor Botez (ROU)	7
Júnior Benítez (ESP)	0
Gurban Gurbanov (AZE)	4
Aaron Bellscheidt (GER)	1
Irfan Mirzoiev (UKR)	3
Emad Ghaly (EGY)	1
Georgios Barbanos (SWE)	13
Richard Fedalen (USA)	4

Quarterfinals
Igor Botez (ROU)	1
Gurban Gurbanov (AZE)	7
Irfan Mirzoiev (UKR)	8
Georgios Barbanos (SWE)	0

Semifinals
Gurban Gurbanov (AZE)	5
Irfan Mirzoiev (UKR)	0

Bottom half

Round of 32
Eito Nishida (JPN)	2
Amir Abdi (IRI)	4
Dimitar Stefchev (BUL)	0
Jakub Šimčik (CZE)	3^{F}
Magomed Edaev (NOR)	0
Attila Tösmagi (HUN)	5^{F}
Temuri Orjonikidze (GEO)	10
Ömer Can Doğan (TUR)	1
Alexandru Solovei (MDA)	4
Merey Maulitkanov (KAZ)	0
Sheroz Ochilov (TJK)	10
Ekke Leitham (EST)	0
David Loher (SUI)	7
Oh Min-seo (KOR)	5
Arman Khachikyan (ARM)	11
Ariell Sosunov (ISR)	0

Round of 16
Amir Abdi (IRI)	8
Jakub Šimčik (CZE)	0
Attila Tösmagi (HUN)	3
Temuri Orjonikidze (GEO)	1
Alexandru Solovei (MDA)	1
Sheroz Ochilov (TJK)	1
David Loher (SUI)	0
Arman Khachikyan (ARM)	9

Quarterfinals
Amir Abdi (IRI)	3
Attila Tösmagi (HUN)	2
Alexandru Solovei (MDA)	7
Arman Khachikyan (ARM)	1

Semifinals
Amir Abdi (IRI)	2
Alexandru Solovei (MDA)	5

Repechage round 1
Esli Martínez (MEX)	1
Aaron Bellscheidt (GER)	7
Merey Maulitkanov (KAZ)	10
Sheroz Ochilov (TJK)	1

Repechage round 2
Aaron Bellscheidt (GER)	0
Igor Botez (ROU)	7
Merey Maulitkanov (KAZ)	3
Arman Khachikyan (ARM)	1

Bronze medal match
Igor Botez (ROU)	6
Irfan Mirzoiev (UKR)	7
Merey Maulitkanov (KAZ)	0
Amir Abdi (IRI)	4

=== 77 kg ===
19 and 20 August

Legend

- F — Won by fall

Final

Final
Deni Nakaev (GER)	7
Yüksel Sarıçiçek (TUR)	4

Top half

Round of 32
Martin Dimitrov (BUL)	5
Guilherme Porto (BRA)	8
Deni Nakaev (GER)	8
Michal Zelenka (CZE)	0
Omar Okil (EGY)	4
Andreas Vasilakopoulos (GRE)	7
Isami Horikita (JPN)	1
Ramazan Pashaiev (UKR)	3

Round of 16
Filip Loch (POL)	0
Guilherme Porto (BRA)	8
Deni Nakaev (GER)	7
Simon Borkenhagen (SWE)	1
Samandar Bobonazarov (UZB)	4
Andreas Vasilakopoulos (GRE)	0
Ramazan Pashaiev (UKR)	3
Benjamin Hansen (NOR)	1

Quarterfinals
Guilherme Porto (BRA)	0
Deni Nakaev (GER)	9
Samandar Bobonazarov (UZB)	9
Ramazan Pashaiev (UKR)	0

Semifinals
Deni Nakaev (GER)	9
Samandar Bobonazarov (UZB)	4

Bottom half

Round of 32
Yüksel Sarıçiçek (TUR)	8
Diego Macías (MEX)	0
Khasay Hasanli (AZE)	5^{F}
Henrik Gevorgyan (ARM)	1
Tornike Mikeladze (GEO)	7
Rajmund Zurai (HUN)	0
Omar Satayev (KAZ)	0
Alexandrin Guțu (MDA)	2

Round of 16
Payton Jacobson (USA)	1
Yüksel Sarıçiçek (TUR)	9
Khasay Hasanli (AZE)	3
Nurel Duishonbekov (KGZ)	2
Masoud Kavousi (IRI)	4
Tornike Mikeladze (GEO)	1
Alexandrin Guțu (MDA)	10
Sachin (IND)	0

Quarterfinals
Yüksel Sarıçiçek (TUR)	4
Khasay Hasanli (AZE)	2
Masoud Kavousi (IRI)	0
Alexandrin Guțu (MDA)	5^{F}

Semifinals
Yüksel Sarıçiçek (TUR)	10
Alexandrin Guțu (MDA)	0

Repechage round 1
Michal Zelenka (CZE)	5
Simon Borkenhagen (SWE)	1
Diego Macías (MEX)	0
Payton Jacobson (USA)	8

Repechage round 2
Michal Zelenka (CZE)	2
Guilherme Porto (BRA)	0
Payton Jacobson (USA)	1
Khasay Hasanli (AZE)	3

Bronze medal match
Michal Zelenka (CZE)	8
Samandar Bobonazarov (UZB)	9
Khasay Hasanli (AZE)	5
Alexandrin Guțu (MDA)	11

=== 82 kg ===
20 and 21 August

Legend

- C — Won by 3 cautions given to the opponent
- F — Won by fall

Final

Final
Achiko Bolkvadze (GEO)	1
Alireza Mohmadi (IRI)	9

Top half

Round of 32
Azimkhon Abdaliyev (KAZ)	1
Artykbek Alymbek Uulu (KGZ)	3
Odysseas Roungeris (GRE)	2
Adrian Artsisheuskiy (USA)	11^{F}
Renta Yamaguchi (JPN)	3
Ivaylo Ivanov (BUL)	2
James Holder (RSA)	10
Marek Vrba (CZE)	18

Round of 16
Ruslan Abdiiev (UKR)	5
Artykbek Alymbek Uulu (KGZ)	1
Adrian Artsisheuskiy (USA)	0
Leon Rivalta (ITA)	8^{F}
Rohit Dahiya (IND)	9
Renta Yamaguchi (JPN)	0
Marek Vrba (CZE)	0
Achiko Bolkvadze (GEO)	9

Quarterfinals
Ruslan Abdiiev (UKR)	9
Leon Rivalta (ITA)	0
Rohit Dahiya (IND)	0
Achiko Bolkvadze (GEO)	9

Semifinals
Ruslan Abdiiev (UKR)	1
Achiko Bolkvadze (GEO)	5

Bottom half

Round of 32
Miloš Perović (SRB)	1
Fares Ghaly (EGY)	10
Alireza Mohmadi (IRI)	9
Christian Medina (MEX)	0
Ruben Gevorgyan (ARM)	10
Alperen Berber (TUR)	13
Jonni Sarkkinen (FIN)	2
Rauf Aliyev (AZE)	1

Round of 16
Olavi Laisarv (EST)	0
Fares Ghaly (EGY)	8
Alireza Mohmadi (IRI)	8
Lin Shan-yu (TPE)	0
Mihai Guțu (MDA)	1
Alperen Berber (TUR)	4
Jonni Sarkkinen (FIN)	3
Alexander Johansson (SWE)	5

Quarterfinals
Fares Ghaly (EGY)	0
Alireza Mohmadi (IRI)	6
Alperen Berber (TUR)	3
Alexander Johansson (SWE)	3

Semifinals
Alireza Mohmadi (IRI)	8
Alperen Berber (TUR)	2

Repechage round 1
Christian Medina (MEX)	5
Lin Shan-yu (TPE)	5

Repechage round 2
Marek Vrba (CZE)	2
Rohit Dahiya (IND)	4
Christian Medina (MEX)	0
Fares Ghaly (EGY)	9

Bronze medal match
Rohit Dahiya (IND)	8^{C}
Ruslan Abdiiev (UKR)	7
Fares Ghaly (EGY)	1
Alperen Berber (TUR)	9

=== 87 kg ===
19 and 20 August

Legend

- F — Won by fall
- R — Retired

Final

Final
Abolfazl Choubani (IRI)	1
Vigen Nazaryan (ARM)	1

Top half

Round of 32
Tomislav Brkan (CRO)	0
Gabriel Lupașco (MDA)	8
Patrik Gordan (ROU)	1
Lachin Valiyev (AZE)	5
Aapo Viitala (FIN)	2
Furkan Taş (TUR)	5
Yun Dong-hyun (KOR)	6
Ivan Manov (BUL)	5
Abolfazl Choubani (IRI)	7
Mario Vuković (SRB)	3

Round of 16
Iago Gobadze (GEO)	4
Gabriel Lupașco (MDA)	5
Lachin Valiyev (AZE)	3
Furkan Taş (TUR)	1
Tomofumi Iwai (JPN)	0
Yun Dong-hyun (KOR)	8
Abolfazl Choubani (IRI)	8
Ondřej Havelka (CZE)	0

Quarterfinals
Gabriel Lupașco (MDA)	5
Lachin Valiyev (AZE)	10
Yun Dong-hyun (KOR)	0
Abolfazl Choubani (IRI)	8

Semifinals
Lachin Valiyev (AZE)	1^{R}
Abolfazl Choubani (IRI)	8

Bottom half

Round of 32
Nikolaos Iosifidis (GRE)	1
Azamatjon Abdubannobov (UZB)	9
Nartu Abdurakhmanov (KGZ)	0
Vigen Nazaryan (ARM)	9
Maksat Sailau (KAZ)	8
Algot Källman (SWE)	2
Kodiak Stephens (USA)	8
Surjeet Singh (IND)	0

Round of 16
Mykyta Alieksieiev (UKR)	8^{F}
Azamatjon Abdubannobov (UZB)	4
Vigen Nazaryan (ARM)	8
Kareem El-Desouky (EGY)	3
Damian Matveiko (LTU)	0
Maksat Sailau (KAZ)	8
Kodiak Stephens (USA)	1
Robin Uspenski (EST)	2

Quarterfinals
Mykyta Alieksieiev (UKR)	1
Vigen Nazaryan (ARM)	3
Maksat Sailau (KAZ)	8
Robin Uspenski (EST)	0

Semifinals
Vigen Nazaryan (ARM)	9
Maksat Sailau (KAZ)	0

Repechage round 1
Mario Vuković (SRB)	3
Ondřej Havelka (CZE)	2^{F}
Nartu Abdurakhmanov (KGZ)	2
Kareem El-Desouky (EGY)	8^{F}

Repechage round 2
Ondřej Havelka (CZE)	4
Yun Dong-hyun (KOR)	4
Kareem El-Desouky (EGY)	2
Mykyta Alieksieiev (UKR)	7^{F}

Bronze medal match
Yun Dong-hyun (KOR)	0
Lachin Valiyev (AZE)	9
Mykyta Alieksieiev (UKR)	0
Maksat Sailau (KAZ)	3^{F}

=== 97 kg ===
20 and 21 August

Legend

- F — Won by fall

Final

Final
Ali Abedi (IRI)	9
Iussuf Matsiyev (KAZ)	4

Top half

Round of 32
Richard Karelson (EST)	2
Harutyun Kirakosyan (ARM)	0
Mateusz Iwanowski (POL)	4
Ionuţ Goşa (ROU)	6
Marko Milanović (CRO)	2
Narinder Cheema (IND)	3

Round of 16
Islomjon Rakhmatov (UZB)	3^{F}
Riku Nakahara (JPN)	0
Richard Karelson (EST)	8
Archontis Xouras (GRE)	0
Ali Abedi (IRI)	1
Ionuţ Goşa (ROU)	1
Narinder Cheema (IND)	3
Roman Balchivschii (MDA)	5

Quarterfinals
Islomjon Rakhmatov (UZB)	0
Richard Karelson (EST)	8
Ali Abedi (IRI)	3
Roman Balchivschii (MDA)	1

Semifinals
Richard Karelson (EST)	1
Ali Abedi (IRI)	1

Bottom half

Round of 32
Iussuf Matsiyev (KAZ)	9
Vladyslav Drahanchuk (UKR)	0
Connor Sammet (GER)	4
Oktay Demir (TUR)	1

Round of 16
Kim Joo-wan (KOR)	0
Luka Katić (SRB)	8
Iussuf Matsiyev (KAZ)	7
Måns Klostermann (SWE)	3
Lasha Bolkvadze (GEO)	5
Connor Sammet (GER)	5
Nurmanbet Raimaly Uulu (KGZ)	9
Christian Carroll (USA)	7

Quarterfinals
Luka Katić (SRB)	5
Iussuf Matsiyev (KAZ)	10^{F}
Connor Sammet (GER)	1
Nurmanbet Raimaly Uulu (KGZ)	6

Semifinals
Iussuf Matsiyev (KAZ)	11
Nurmanbet Raimaly Uulu (KGZ)	2

Repechage round 1
Vladyslav Drahanchuk (UKR)	0
Måns Klostermann (SWE)	9

Repechage round 2
Ionuţ Goşa (ROU)	1
Roman Balchivschii (MDA)	5
Måns Klostermann (SWE)	1
Luka Katić (SRB)	1

Bronze medal match
Roman Balchivschii (MDA)	0
Richard Karelson (EST)	9
Luka Katić (SRB)	0
Nurmanbet Raimaly Uulu (KGZ)	8

=== 130 kg ===
19 and 20 August

Legend

- F — Won by fall

Main bracket

Round of 16
Artur Sarkisjan (CZE)	2
Talip Çiftçi (TUR)	4^{F}
Dominik Krawczyk (POL)	0
Temurbek Nasimov (UZB)	9
Jokhar Uzarov (KAZ)	0
Fardin Hedayati (IRI)	4
Eerik Pank (EST)	0
Albert Vardanyan (ARM)	8
Parvesh (IND)	4
Aden Attao (USA)	12^{F}
Tsotne Tsintsadze (GEO)	2
Adolf Bazsó (HUN)	6^{F}
Fekry Eissa (EGY)	8^{F}
Rafail Gkirnis (GRE)	0
Mykhailo Vyshnyvetskyi (UKR)	2^{F}
Park Jun-ho (KOR)	0

Quarterfinals
Talip Çiftçi (TUR)	1
Temurbek Nasimov (UZB)	3
Fardin Hedayati (IRI)	7
Albert Vardanyan (ARM)	2
Aden Attao (USA)	7^{F}
Adolf Bazsó (HUN)	8
Fekry Eissa (EGY)	7
Mykhailo Vyshnyvetskyi (UKR)	9

Semifinals
Temurbek Nasimov (UZB)	1
Fardin Hedayati (IRI)	5
Aden Attao (USA)	0
Mykhailo Vyshnyvetskyi (UKR)	10

Final
Fardin Hedayati (IRI)	4
Mykhailo Vyshnyvetskyi (UKR)	6

Repechage round
Jokhar Uzarov (KAZ)	5
Albert Vardanyan (ARM)	9
Park Jun-ho (KOR)	0
Fekry Eissa (EGY)	8

Bronze medal match
Albert Vardanyan (ARM)	5
Temurbek Nasimov (UZB)	10
Fekry Eissa (EGY)	3
Aden Attao (USA)	11

== See also ==
- 2022 World Junior Wrestling Championships – Men's freestyle
- 2022 World Junior Wrestling Championships – Women's freestyle
