= 2019 U17 Pan American Wrestling Championships =

- Host city: (Mexico) Morelia
- Dates: 28–30 June 2019

Champions
- Freestyle: United States
- Greco-Roman: United States
- Women: United States

The 2019 U17 Pan American Wrestling Championships was held from 28 to 30 June in Morelia, Mexico.

== Medal summary ==
=== Men's freestyle ===
Event	Gold	Silver	Bronze
45 kg	Daniel Sheen; United States	Esteban Morales Mayancha; Ecuador	Carlos Hernandez Perez; Mexico
48 kg	Joey Fischer; United States	Treye Trotman; Canada	Helisson Queiroz Bresson; Brazil
51 kg	Nico Provo; United States	Enrique Herrera; Peru	Luisaldo Cortez Garcia; Mexico
51 kg	Nico Provo; United States	Enrique Herrera; Peru	Marlon Godinez Perez; Guatemala
55 kg	Jacob Rundell; United States	Fotis Papadopoulos; Canada	Erick Barroso Bautista; Mexico
55 kg	Jacob Rundell; United States	Fotis Papadopoulos; Canada	Miguel Gaspar Rivas; Ecuador
60 kg	Jesse Mendez; United States	Jan Lopez Solis; Mexico	Peter McCrackin; Canada
65 kg	Robert Perez III; United States	Stone Lewis; Canada	Jonathan Perez Castellanos; Guatemala
65 kg	Robert Perez III; United States	Stone Lewis; Canada	Matias Munoz Ramirez; Chile
71 kg	John Best; United States	Lautaro Seghesso; Argentina	Carlos Sevillano Gongora; Ecuador
71 kg	John Best; United States	Lautaro Seghesso; Argentina	Malhcon Pineda Cunil; Guatemala
80 kg	Ismail Ayyoub; Canada	Jack Darrah; United States	Juan lazaro Iturriza Ruiz; Mexico
92 kg	Michael Misita; United States	Jorge de la O Olan; Mexico	Gabriel de Sousa Silva; Brazil
110 kg	Braxton Mikesell; United States	Axel Ortega Luna; Mexico	Diego Nole Azabache; Peru

=== Men's Greco-Roman ===
Event	Gold	Silver	Bronze
45 kg	Daniel Sheen; United States	Fernando Perez Vazquez; Mexico	Esteban Morales Mayancha; Ecuador
48 kg	Joey Fischer; United States	Jeremy Peralta Gonzalez; Ecuador	Diego Rodriguez Vielma; Mexico
51 kg	Enrique Herrera; Peru	Angel Segura Tellez; Mexico	Nico Provo; United States
55 kg	Antonio Ruiz Mora; Ecuador	Hector Garza Yedra; Mexico	Cristian Gómez; Colombia
55 kg	Antonio Ruiz Mora; Ecuador	Hector Garza Yedra; Mexico	Hernan Almendra; Argentina
60 kg	Jesse Mendez; United States	Uvaldo Camacho Diaz; Mexico	Guilherme Pires Negreiros; Brazil
65 kg	Robert Perez III; United States	Fernando Ferrer Ciprian; Dominican Republic	Brian Lopez Barroso; Mexico
65 kg	Robert Perez III; United States	Fernando Ferrer Ciprian; Dominican Republic	Guilherme Barros de Arrunda Porto; Brazil
71 kg	John Best; United States	Lautaro Seghesso; Argentina	Carlos Sevillano Gongora; Ecuador
71 kg	John Best; United States	Lautaro Seghesso; Argentina	Diego Macias Torres; Mexico
80 kg	Jack Darrah; United States	Juan Montmayor Perez; Mexico	Nicolas Araya Tapia; Chile
92 kg	Michael Misita; United States	Alexander Perez Mayorga; Mexico	Jhon Sanchez Solis; Ecuador
110 kg	Braxton Mikesell; United States	Diego Nole Azabache; Peru	Angel Sanchez Flores; Mexico

=== Women ===
Event	Gold	Silver	Bronze
40 kg	Virginia Foard; United States	Ruth Franco Bajana; Ecuador	Not awarded
43 kg	Lizette Rodriguez; United States	Jeyla Herrera Villegas; Ecuador	Samaris Fuentes Huicab; Mexico
46 kg	Adriana Hernandez Sanchez; Mexico	Nyla Valencia; United States	Serena di Benedetto; Canada
49 kg	Samara Chavez; United States	Samantha Adams; Canada	Gloria Asca Vilcapoma; Peru
49 kg	Samara Chavez; United States	Samantha Adams; Canada	Shanitzia Mercado Ortiz; Puerto Rico
53 kg	Melanie Mendoza; United States	Grecia Bernal Betancourt; Mexico	Selena Rojas Astoray; Peru
57 kg	Skye Realin; United States	Antonia Valdez Arriagada; Chile	Diana Arsagova; Canada
61 kg	Mia Macaluso; United States	Makitha Bristol; Canada	Wendy Caicedo Nazareno; Ecuador
65 kg	Nicoll Parrado; Colombia	Sandra Escamilla Menchaca; Mexico	Nyla Burgess; Canada
69 kg	Tiffani Baublitz; United States	Vianne Rouleau; Canada	Ximena Suarez Rodriguez; Mexico
73 kg	Tristan Kelly; United States	Erinn Valdez Enriquez; Mexico	Kaylee Welsh; Canada

== Medal table ==
* Host nation (Mexico)

Rank	Nation	Gold	Silver	Bronze	Total
1	United States	25	2	1	28
2	Mexico*	1	12	10	23
3	Canada	1	6	5	12
4	Ecuador	1	4	6	11
5	Peru	1	2	3	6
6	Colombia	1	0	1	2
7	Argentina	0	2	1	3
8	Chile	0	1	2	3
9	Dominican Republic	0	1	0	1
10	Brazil	0	0	4	4
11	Guatemala	0	0	3	3
12	Puerto Rico	0	0	1	1
Totals (12 entries)		30	30	37	97

== Team ranking ==
Rank	Men's freestyle		Men's Greco-Roman		Women's freestyle	
Rank	Team	Points	Team	Points	Team	Points
1	United States	245	United States	215	United States	220
2	Mexico	138	Mexico	180	Mexico	147
3	Canada	134	Ecuador	90	Canada	137
4	Peru	83	Peru	90	Peru	76
5	Brazil	65	Argentina	45	Ecuador	67
6	Ecuador	61	Brazil	45	Brazil Panama	36
7	Guatemala	57	Dominican Republic	20	—	
8	Argentina	46	Colombia	20	Colombia	35
9	Colombia	38	Guatemala	20	Chile	20
10	Panama	38	Chile	15	Puerto Rico	15
