= Wrestling at the 2019 European Youth Summer Olympic Festival =

- Venue: Heydar Aliyev Arena
- Dates: 21–23 July
- Competitors: 275 from 35 nations

Wrestling at the 2019 European Youth Summer Olympic Festival was held at the Heydar Aliyev Arena, Baku, Azerbaijan from 21 to 23 July 2019.

== Schedule ==
| P | Preliminary rounds & Repechage | F | Finals |

| Event↓/Date → | 21st Sun | | 22nd Mon | | 23rd Tue | |
|---|---|---|---|---|---|---|
| Boys freestyle 45 kg | P | F | | | | |
| Boys freestyle 48 kg | | | P | F | | |
| Boys freestyle 51 kg | | | | | P | F |
| Boys freestyle 55 kg | P | F | | | | |
| Boys freestyle 60 kg | | | P | F | | |
| Boys freestyle 65 kg | | | | | P | F |
| Boys Greco-Roman 45 kg | P | F | | | | |
| Boys Greco-Roman 48 kg | | | P | F | | |
| Boys Greco-Roman 51 kg | | | | | P | F |
| Boys Greco-Roman 55 kg | P | F | | | | |
| Boys Greco-Roman 60 kg | | | P | F | | |
| Boys Greco-Roman 65 kg | | | | | P | F |
| Girls freestyle 46 kg | | | P | F | | |
| Girls freestyle 49 kg | | | P | F | | |
| Girls freestyle 53 kg | | | | | P | F |
| Girls freestyle 57 kg | | | | | P | F |
| Girls freestyle 61 kg | | | P | F | | |
| Girls freestyle 65 kg | | | | | P | F |

== Medalists ==
=== Boys freestyle ===
| Event | Gold | Silver | Bronze |
|---|---|---|---|
| 45 kg | Murad Hagverdiyev; Azerbaijan | Nikolozi Santeladze; Georgia | Eldar Asakaev; Russia |
| 48 kg | Magomedamin Bekbulatov; Russia | Luka Gugeshashvili; Georgia | Yahor Rudauski; Belarus |
| 48 kg | Magomedamin Bekbulatov; Russia | Luka Gugeshashvili; Georgia | Mirjavad Nabiyev; Azerbaijan |
| 51 kg | Kanan Heybatov; Azerbaijan | Constantin Chirilov; Moldova^{[a]} | Ivan Terzi; Ukraine |
| 51 kg | Kanan Heybatov; Azerbaijan | Constantin Chirilov; Moldova^{[a]} | Otar Mamulashvili; Georgia |
| 55 kg | Simone Piroddu; Italy | Abulfaz Nasirov; Azerbaijan | Benedek Kiss; Hungary |
| 55 kg | Simone Piroddu; Italy | Abulfaz Nasirov; Azerbaijan | Magomed-Emi Eltemirov; Russia |
| 60 kg | Fedor Baltuev; Russia | Sabir Jafarov; Azerbaijan | Daviti Abdaladze; Georgia |
| 60 kg | Fedor Baltuev; Russia | Sabir Jafarov; Azerbaijan | Anatoli Hramyka; Belarus |
| 65 kg | Dzhabrail Gadzhiev; Azerbaijan | Batyrbek Tskhovrebov; Russia | Davit Patsinashvili; Georgia |
| 65 kg | Dzhabrail Gadzhiev; Azerbaijan | Batyrbek Tskhovrebov; Russia | Ivan Semenov; Ukraine |

^{a} Rustam Dolaev from Russia originally won the silver medal, but was later disqualified for doping violations.

=== Boys Greco-Roman ===
| Event | Gold | Silver | Bronze |
|---|---|---|---|
| 45 kg | Farid Sadikhli; Azerbaijan | Umut Çoban; Turkey | Maksim Gurov; Russia |
| 45 kg | Farid Sadikhli; Azerbaijan | Umut Çoban; Turkey | Kaspars Bondarenko; Latvia |
| 48 kg | Gurban Gurbanov; Azerbaijan | Khvicha Abuladze; Georgia | Noah Englich; Germany |
| 48 kg | Gurban Gurbanov; Azerbaijan | Khvicha Abuladze; Georgia | Maksim Stupakevich; Belarus |
| 51 kg | Elmir Aliyev; Azerbaijan | Sanya Yakovlev; Ukraine | Piotr Stolarczyk; Poland |
| 51 kg | Elmir Aliyev; Azerbaijan | Sanya Yakovlev; Ukraine | Nukri Benidze; Georgia |
| 55 kg | Hleb Makaranka; Belarus | Romeo Beridze; Georgia | Nihat Mammadli; Azerbaijan |
| 55 kg | Hleb Makaranka; Belarus | Romeo Beridze; Georgia | Danil Grigorev; Russia |
| 60 kg | Hasrat Jafarov; Azerbaijan | Magomed Gigiev; Russia | Mikita Murashka; Belarus |
| 60 kg | Hasrat Jafarov; Azerbaijan | Magomed Gigiev; Russia | Nika Broladze; Georgia |
| 65 kg | Khasay Hasanli; Azerbaijan | Deni Nakaev; Germany | Abdul-Valid Iakhiev; Russia |
| 65 kg | Khasay Hasanli; Azerbaijan | Deni Nakaev; Germany | Marian Holubovskyi; Ukraine |

=== Girls freestyle ===
| Event | Gold | Silver | Bronze |
|---|---|---|---|
| 46 kg | Georgiana Antuca; Romania | Gultakin Shirinova; Azerbaijan | Justine Vigouroux; France |
| 46 kg | Georgiana Antuca; Romania | Gultakin Shirinova; Azerbaijan | Vivien Matyi; Hungary |
| 49 kg | Emine Çakmak; Turkey | Ana Maria Pârvu; Romania | Aliaksandra Kisliakova; Belarus |
| 49 kg | Emine Çakmak; Turkey | Ana Maria Pârvu; Romania | Mihaela Samoil; Moldova |
| 53 kg | Polina Lukina; Russia | Elnura Mammadova; Azerbaijan | Flóra Vízi; Hungary |
| 53 kg | Polina Lukina; Russia | Elnura Mammadova; Azerbaijan | Amory Andrich; Germany |
| 57 kg | Krystsina Zdunkevich; Belarus | Othelie Høie; Norway | Róza Szenttamási; Hungary |
| 57 kg | Krystsina Zdunkevich; Belarus | Othelie Høie; Norway | Daria Manuil; Russia |
| 61 kg | Aurora Russo; Italy | Marziya Sadigova; Azerbaijan | Gerda Barth; Germany |
| 61 kg | Aurora Russo; Italy | Marziya Sadigova; Azerbaijan | Alina Kasabieva; Russia |
| 65 kg | Yana Tretsiak; Belarus | Nesrin Baş; Turkey | Aleksandra Prokina; Russia |
| 65 kg | Yana Tretsiak; Belarus | Nesrin Baş; Turkey | Nigar Mirzazada; Azerbaijan |

== Medal table ==
* Host nation (Azerbaijan)

| Rank | Nation | Gold | Silver | Bronze | Total |
|---|---|---|---|---|---|
| 1 | Azerbaijan (AZE)* | 8 | 5 | 3 | 16 |
| 2 | Russia (RUS) | 3 | 2 | 8 | 13 |
| 3 | Belarus (BLR) | 3 | 0 | 5 | 8 |
| 4 | Italy (ITA) | 2 | 0 | 0 | 2 |
| 5 | Turkey (TUR) | 1 | 2 | 0 | 3 |
| 6 | Romania (ROU) | 1 | 1 | 0 | 2 |
| 7 | Georgia (GEO) | 0 | 4 | 5 | 9 |
| 8 | Germany (GER) | 0 | 1 | 3 | 4 |
| 8 | Ukraine (UKR) | 0 | 1 | 3 | 4 |
| 10 | Moldova (MDA) | 0 | 1 | 1 | 2 |
| 11 | Norway (NOR) | 0 | 1 | 0 | 1 |
| 12 | Hungary (HUN) | 0 | 0 | 4 | 4 |
| 13 | France (FRA) | 0 | 0 | 1 | 1 |
| 13 | Latvia (LAT) | 0 | 0 | 1 | 1 |
| 13 | Poland (POL) | 0 | 0 | 1 | 1 |
| Totals (15 entries) | | 18 | 18 | 35 | 71 |

== Participating nations ==
A total of 275 athletes from 35 nations competed in wrestling at the 2019 European Youth Summer Olympic Festival:

- Albania (1)
- Austria (8)
- Azerbaijan (18)
- Belarus (16)
- Bulgaria (6)
- Croatia (5)
- Czech Republic (2)
- Estonia (6)
- Finland (10)
- France (10)
- Georgia (12)
- Germany (14)
- Great Britain (2)
- Greece (7)
- Hungary (9)
- Israel (2)
- Italy (17)
- Kosovo (2)
- Latvia (3)
- Lithuania (11)
- Moldova (7)
- Netherlands (1)
- North Macedonia (1)
- Norway (7)
- Poland (18)
- Portugal (2)
- Romania (15)
- Russia (18)
- Serbia (2)
- Slovenia (1)
- Slovakia (5)
- Spain (3)
- Switzerland (4)
- Turkey (18)
- Ukraine (12)
