= 2019 U15 Pan American Wrestling Championships =

- Host city: Panama City
- Dates: 1–3 November 2019

Champions
- Freestyle: United States
- Greco-Roman: United States
- Women: United States

The 2019 U15 Pan American Wrestling Championships was the 2nd edition of U15 Pan American Wrestling Championships of combined events, and it was held from 1 to 3 November in Panama City, Panama.

== Medal summary ==
=== Men's freestyle ===
Event	Gold	Silver	Bronze
38 kg	Elias Navida; United States	Fabián Ríos; Colombia	Samir Marciaga; Panama
41 kg	Roger Kantun Ku; Mexico	Pedro Toribio Torres; Peru	Jeremy Raymundo; Guatemala
44 kg	Paul Kelly; United States	Ronald Montoya Castillo; Panama	Ian Landin Ribeiro; Brazil
48 kg	Greyson Clark; United States	Jaminton Leon; Colombia	Abel Sanchez Juares; Peru
52 kg	Lane Gilbert; United States	Alan Gomez Hermosillo; Mexico	Víctor Jaramillo; Colombia
52 kg	Lane Gilbert; United States	Alan Gomez Hermosillo; Mexico	Carlos Barrios; Bolivia
57 kg	Jayden Colon; United States	Axel Medrano Garcia; Mexico	Caleb Negron; Puerto Rico
57 kg	Jayden Colon; United States	Axel Medrano Garcia; Mexico	Edwin Allain Miranda; Peru
62 kg	Braden Stauffenberg; United States	Luis Izquerdo; Colombia	Isaac Lopez Perez; El Salvador
62 kg	Braden Stauffenberg; United States	Luis Izquerdo; Colombia	Roberto Martinez Armenta; Mexico
68 kg	Thor Michaelson; United States	Miguel Gonzalez Gomez; Mexico	Junior Leguizamón; Colombia
68 kg	Thor Michaelson; United States	Miguel Gonzalez Gomez; Mexico	Alexander Cusinga Gomez; Peru
75 kg	Antony Tuttle; United States	Carlos Serrano Lopez; Mexico	Enrique Olvera Rodriguez; Mexico
85 kg	Nathan Wemstrom; United States	Erick Martinez; Puerto Rico	Alan Perez Uribe; Mexico

=== Men's Greco-Roman ===
Event	Gold	Silver	Bronze
38 kg	Elias Navida; United States	Samir Marciaga; Panama	Fabián Ríos; Colombia
41 kg	Pedro Toribio Torres; Peru	Yered Vargas Martinez; Mexico	Gustavo Santos Silva; Brazil
44 kg	Paul Kelly; United States	Ian Landin Ribeiro; Brazil	Mario Caceres; Colombia
48 kg	Greyson Clark; United States	Abel Sanchez Juares; Peru	Fran Uribe; Colombia
52 kg	Lane Gilbert; United States	Juan Guerrero; Colombia	Angel Barba Rodriguez; Panama
57 kg	Jayden Colon; United States	Edwin Allain Miranda; Peru	Jhonier Giraldo; Colombia
62 kg	Braden Stauffenberg; United States	Hector Loera Rojas; Mexico	Franco Gonzalez Palma; Chile
68 kg	Thor Michaelson; United States	Dario Cubas Castillo; Peru	Cristian Cabrejos Vigo; Chile
75 kg	Antony Tuttle; United States	Enrique Olvera Rodriguez; Mexico	Eduardo Vega Garcia; Panama
85 kg	Nathan Wemstrom; United States	Luis De La Rosa; Mexico	Samuel Londoño; Colombia

=== Women ===
Event	Gold	Silver	Bronze
33 kg	Elizabeth Brunson; United States	Not awarded	
36 kg	Angie Dill; United States	Not awarded	
39 kg	Audrey Jimenez; United States	Andry Franco; Colombia	Angie Dill; United States
42 kg	Rianne Murphy; United States	Anett Huaman Mallqui; Peru	Ileana Aguilar Gonzalez; Mexico
46 kg	Shammiklka Miranda; Puerto Rico	Yusneyri West; Panama	Zao Estrada; United States
50 kg	Yorlenis Moran Sanchez; Panama	Sofia Ocegueda Gonzalez; Mexico	Faith Cole; United States
54 kg	Katie Gomez; United States	Marciela Molina Rivasplata; Peru	Rachel Arquinez; Panama
58 kg	Bertha Daneila Rojas Chavez; Mexico	Savannah Cosme; United States	María Villa; Colombia
58 kg	Bertha Daneila Rojas Chavez; Mexico	Savannah Cosme; United States	Camila Roa Ortega; Peru
62 kg	Haley Ward; United States	Nathaly Obando Rojas; Chile	Abigail Rodriguez; Panama
66 kg	Ella Pagel; United States	Lili Collazos; Colombia	Not awarded

== Medal table ==
* Host nation (Panama)

Rank	Nation	Gold	Silver	Bronze	Total
1	United States	25	1	3	29
2	Mexico	2	9	4	15
3	Peru	1	6	4	11
4	Panama*	1	3	5	9
5	Puerto Rico	1	1	1	3
6	Colombia	0	6	8	14
7	Brazil	0	1	2	3
7	Chile	0	1	2	3
9	Bolivia	0	0	1	1
9	El Salvador	0	0	1	1
9	Guatemala	0	0	1	1
Totals (11 entries)		30	28	32	90

== Team ranking ==
Rank	Men's freestyle		Men's Greco-Roman		Women's freestyle	
Rank	Team	Points	Team	Points	Team	Points
1	United States	225	United States	225	United States	175
2	Mexico	135	Panama	126	Panama	107
3	Colombia	122	Colombia	115	Colombia	86
4	Panama	117	Peru	85	Mexico	70
5	Peru	65	Mexico	80	Peru	55
6	Puerto Rico	35	Brazil	44	Puerto Rico	37
7	El Salvador	33	Chile	40	Bolivia	22
8	Bolivia	25	Bolivia	33	Guatemala	21
9	Guatemala	24	Guatemala	22	Chile	20
10	Chile	24	El Salvador	12	El Salvador	10
11	Brazil	23			Barbados	8
