= Tristan Kelly =

American freestyle wrestler (born 2002)

Personal information
- Full name: Tristan Nicole Kelly
- Born: March 28, 2002 (age 24) Erie, Colorado, U.S.

Sport
- Country: United States
- Sport: Amateur wrestling
- Weight class: 76 kg
- Events: Freestyle and Folkstyle wrestling
Medal record
Women's freestyle wrestling
Representing United States
World Military Championships
Gold medal – first place	2023 Baku	76 kg
Silver medal – second place	2024 Yerevan	76 kg
Junior Pan American Games
Gold medal – first place	2025 Asunción	76 kg
U20 World Championships
Bronze medal – third place	2022 Sofia	76 kg
U23 Pan American Championships
Gold medal – first place	2024 Rionegro	76 kg
U17 Pan American Championships
Gold medal – first place	2019 Morelia	73 kg

Tristan Nicole Kelly (born March 28, 2002) is an American freestyle and folkstyle wrestler. She competed in collegiate wrestling at Colorado Mesa and McKendree, the latter where she won the NCAA Women’s Wrestling Championships in 2026.

== Career ==
Born in Erie, Colorado, Kelly attended Douglas County High School, where she became a three-time state champion. She was awarded the Tricia Saunders High School Excellence Award in 2020 for her achievements at Douglas County. While still in high school, she won a gold medal at the 2019 U17 Pan American Wrestling Championships in the 73 kg category.

After graduating from Douglas County High School in 2020, Kelly enrolled at Colorado Mesa University. Shortly afterward, she joined the U.S. Army World Class Athlete Program. By 2023, she transferred to McKendree University.

Kelly won a bronze medal from the 2022 U20 World Wrestling Championships. She then won a gold medal at the 2023 World Military Championships and a silver medal at the 2024 edition, both in the 76 kg category. Between these two World Military Championships, she won a gold medal at the 2024 U23 Pan American Wrestling Championships.

In August 2025, Kelly won a gold medal at the Junior Pan American Games. In March 2026, she won the NCAA Women’s Wrestling Championships in the 207 lb category.

== Championships and accomplishments ==
=== Freestyle wrestling ===
- NCAA
  - 2026 NCAA Women’s Wrestling Champion - 207 lbs.
