= 2025 U23 World Wrestling Championships – Women's freestyle 50 kg =

Wrestling competitions

Women's freestyle 50 kg at the 2025 U23 World Championships
- Venue: SPC Vojvodina
- Dates: 22–23 October
- Competitors: 24 from 22 nations

Medalists
gold medal	Liang Jinyue	China
silver medal	Audrey Jimenez	United States
bronze medal	Aida Kerymova	Ukraine
bronze medal	Mönkhbatyn Mönkhgerel	Mongolia

The women's freestyle 50 kilograms is a competition featured at the 2025 U23 World Wrestling Championships, and was held in Novi Sad, Serbia on 22 and 23 October 2025.

This freestyle wrestling competition consists of a single-elimination tournament, with a repechage used to determine the winner of two bronze medals. The two finalists face off for gold and silver medals. Each wrestler who loses to one of the two finalists moves into the repechage, culminating in a pair of bronze medal matches featuring the semifinal losers each facing the remaining repechage opponent from their half of the bracket.

== Results ==
Legend

- F — Won by fall

=== Final ===
Final
Audrey Jimenez (USA)	2
Liang Jinyue (CHN)	6

=== Top half ===
Round of 32
Aida Kerymova (UKR)	7
María Cazalla (ESP)	0
Minoriho Yonehara (JPN)	10
Anđela Vasiljević (SRB)	0
Svenja Jungo (SUI)	9
Ana Palacios (MEX)	2
Hanny Kumari (IND)	4
Sviatlana Katenka (UWW)	6^{F}

Round of 16
Gabija Dilytė (LTU)	5
Aida Kerymova (UKR)	12
Minoriho Yonehara (JPN)	3
Greili Bencosme (CUB)	6
Audrey Jimenez (USA)	12
Svenja Jungo (SUI)	6
Sviatlana Katenka (UWW)	1
Nohalis Loyo (VEN)	3

Quarterfinals
Aida Kerymova (UKR)	5^{F}
Greili Bencosme (CUB)	7
Audrey Jimenez (USA)	10
Nohalis Loyo (VEN)	0

Semifinals
Aida Kerymova (UKR)	2
Audrey Jimenez (USA)	5

=== Bottom half ===
Round of 32
Laura Ganikyzy (KAZ)	0
Natalia Walczak (POL)	6^{F}
Natalia Pudova (UWW)	10
Asmar Jankurtaran (AZE)	0
Mönkhbatyn Mönkhgerel (MGL)	6^{F}
Mushtariy Tolipbekova (UZB)	1
Marija Spirkovska (MKD)	0
Liang Jinyue (CHN)	2^{F}

Round of 16
Chahrazed Ayachi (TUN)	4
Natalia Walczak (POL)	14
Natalia Pudova (UWW)	11
Maddie MacKenzie (CAN)	0
Songül Kavak (TUR)	6
Mönkhbatyn Mönkhgerel (MGL)	10
Liang Jinyue (CHN)	10
Aika Brady (AUS)	0

Quarterfinals
Natalia Walczak (POL)	7
Natalia Pudova (UWW)	3^{F}
Mönkhbatyn Mönkhgerel (MGL)	2
Liang Jinyue (CHN)	12

Semifinals
Natalia Pudova (UWW)	3
Liang Jinyue (CHN)	10

=== Repechage ===
Repechage round 1
Marija Spirkovska (MKD)	6^{F}
Aika Brady (AUS)	7

Repechage round 2
Svenja Jungo (SUI)	6
Nohalis Loyo (VEN)	9
Marija Spirkovska (MKD)	0
Mönkhbatyn Mönkhgerel (MGL)	4^{F}

Bronze medals
Nohalis Loyo (VEN)	7
Aida Kerymova (UKR)	9
Mönkhbatyn Mönkhgerel (MGL)	5
Natalia Pudova (UWW)	4

== Final standing ==
Rank	Athlete
1st place, gold medalist(s)	Liang Jinyue (CHN)
2nd place, silver medalist(s)	Audrey Jimenez (USA)
3rd place, bronze medalist(s)	Aida Kerymova (UKR)
3rd place, bronze medalist(s)	Mönkhbatyn Mönkhgerel (MGL)
5	Nohalis Loyo (VEN)
5	Natalia Pudova (UWW)
7	Natalia Walczak (POL)
8	Sviatlana Katenka (UWW)
9	Marija Spirkovska (MKD)
10	Minoriho Yonehara (JPN)
11	Svenja Jungo (SUI)
12	Greili Bencosme (CUB)
13	Songül Kavak (TUR)
14	Gabija Dilytė (LTU)
15	Chahrazed Ayachi (TUN)
16	Ana Palacios (MEX)
17	Aika Brady (AUS)
18	Hanny Kumari (IND)
19	Mushtariy Tolipbekova (UZB)
20	Laura Ganikyzy (KAZ)
21	María Cazalla (ESP)
22	Anđela Vasiljević (SRB)
23	Asmar Jankurtaran (AZE)
24	Maddie MacKenzie (CAN)
