= 2023 U23 World Wrestling Championships – Women's freestyle 50 kg =

Wrestling competitions

Women's freestyle 50 kg at the 2023 U23 World Championships
- Venue: Tirana Olympic Park
- Dates: 25–26 October
- Competitors: 20 from 17 nations

Medalists
gold medal	Umi Ito	Japan
silver medal	Audrey Jimenez	United States
bronze medal	Emma Luttenauer	France
bronze medal	Elnura Mammadova	Azerbaijan

The women's freestyle 50 kilograms is a competition featured at the 2023 U23 World Wrestling Championships, and will held in Tirana, Albania on 25 and 26 October 2023.

This freestyle wrestling competition consists of a single-elimination tournament, with a repechage used to determine the winner of two bronze medals. The two finalists face off for gold and silver medals. Each wrestler who loses to one of the two finalists moves into the repechage, culminating in a pair of bronze medal matches featuring the semifinal losers each facing the remaining repechage opponent from their half of the bracket.

== Results ==
Legend

- F — Won by fall
- WO — Won by walkover

=== Final ===
Final
Umi Ito (JPN)	WO
Audrey Jimenez (USA)

=== Top half ===
Round of 32
Nada Medani (EGY)	0
Anastasiya Yanotava (ANA)	10
Szimonetta Szekér (HUN)	5^{F}
Khrystyna Basych (SVK)	0

Round of 16
Emma Luttenauer (FRA)	9
Ana Maria Pîrvu (ROU)	0
Anastasiya Yanotava (ANA)	5
Emanuela Liuzzi (ITA)	8
Umi Ito (JPN)	10
Szimonetta Szekér (HUN)	0
Amanda Tomczyk (POL)	0
Aida Kerymova (UKR)	10

Quarterfinals
Emma Luttenauer (FRA)	7
Emanuela Liuzzi (ITA)	0
Umi Ito (JPN)	13
Aida Kerymova (UKR)	2

Semifinals
Emma Luttenauer (FRA)	0
Umi Ito (JPN)	10

=== Bottom half ===
Round of 32
Laura Ganikyzy (KAZ)	5
Zehra Demirhan (TUR)	6
Neelam Sirohi (UWW)	12
Maria Leorda (MDA)	2

Round of 16
Elnura Mammadova (AZE)	6^{F}
Kelyn Young (CAN)	0
Zehra Demirhan (TUR)	6
Mariia Tiumerekova (ANA)	9
Gabija Dilytė (LTU)	2
Neelam Sirohi (UWW)	9
Ana Torres (ESP)	0
Audrey Jimenez (USA)	10

Quarterfinals
Elnura Mammadova (AZE)	8
Mariia Tiumerekova (ANA)	7
Neelam Sirohi (UWW)	2
Audrey Jimenez (USA)	12

Semifinals
Elnura Mammadova (AZE)	4
Audrey Jimenez (USA)	7

=== Repechage ===
Repechage round 2
Szimonetta Szekér (HUN)	0
Aida Kerymova (UKR)	3
Ana Torres (ESP)	0
Neelam Sirohi (UWW)	10

Bronze medals
Aida Kerymova (UKR)	0
Emma Luttenauer (FRA)	7
Neelam Sirohi (UWW)	5
Elnura Mammadova (AZE)	8
