= 2026 NCAA Women's Wrestling Championships =

American collegiate wrestling tournament

- Season: 2025–26
- Teams: 52
- Format: Double-elimination
- Finals site: Xtream Arena; Coralville, Iowa
- Champions: McKendree (1st title)
- Runner-up: Iowa
- Winning coach: Alexio Garcia (1st title)
- OW: Audrey Jimenez (Lehigh)
- Attendance: 1,991 (session I); 2,047 (session II); 2,166 (session III); 2,383 (session IV); 8,587 (Total Combined Attendance)
- Television: ESPN+ ESPNU

The 2026 NCAA Women's Wrestling Championships was the 1st annual NCAA Women's Wrestling Championship that took place from March 6–7, 2026 at Xtream Arena in Coralville, Iowa.

McKendree won its first national team title under head coach Alexio Garcia at the inaugural NCAA Women's Wrestling Championship. The Bearcats finished ahead of runner-up Iowa in a closely contested team race, winning 171–166. McKendree entered the championship as the top-ranked team after overtaking Iowa for the No. 1 position in the national coaches poll ahead of nationals.

McKendree and Iowa each crowned three individual national champions. McKendree's Yu Sakamoto, Cameron Guerin, and Tristan Kelly, along with Iowa's Valarie Solorio, Kennedy Blades, and Kylie Welker, won national titles in their respective weight classes. Guerin became the first wrestler in collegiate women's wrestling history to win five national championships. Four additional schools produced individual champions: Lehigh's Audrey Jimenez won the 110-pound title and was named the tournament's Outstanding Wrestler; Quincy's Xochitl Mota-Pettis won at 124 pounds; Grand Valley State's Katerina Lange captured the 138-pound title; and North Central's Bella Mir won the 145-pound championship by fall.

== Qualification ==
Since there is only one national collegiate championship for women's wrestling, all NCAA women's wrestling programs (whether from Division I, Division II, or Division III) were eligible to compete in a single, unified field. A total of 53 teams were represented in the tournament, with 180 individual wrestlers earning spots through six regional qualifying tournaments. The national qualifiers, individual seedings, and official brackets were revealed in a selection show streamed on NCAA.com on February 27, 2026.

The field of 180 national qualifiers was determined through six regional tournaments held on February 20–21, 2026. The top three finishers in each of the ten weight classes at each regional automatically advanced to the national tournament field. No at-large bids were awarded.

| Region | Host School | Venue | Location |
|---|---|---|---|
| Region 1 | Elmira | Lecom Event Center | Elmira, NY |
| Region 2 | West Liberty | Academic, Sports & Recreation Complex | West Liberty, WV |
| Region 3 | Emmanuel | Shaw Athletic Center | Franklin Springs, GA |
| Region 4 | Tiffin | Heminger Center | Tiffin, OH |
| Region 5 | Simpson | Cowles Fieldhouse | Indianola, IA |
| Region 6 | Lindenwood | Hyland Arena | St. Charles, MO |

== Participating teams ==
A total of 52 teams qualified individual wrestlers to the national tournament field. Because the event used a unified National Collegiate format, the multi-division tournament field included six schools from Division I and 23 schools each from Divisions II and III.

- Adrian (2)
- Alfred State (1)
- Allen (1)
- Augustana (IL) (2)
- Aurora (3)
- Bridgeport (1)
- Carthage (1)
- Chadron State (3)
- Colorado Mesa (4)
- Delaware State (2)
- Dubuque (2)
- D'Youville (2)
- Eastern (5)
- East Stroudsburg (5)
- Elmira (2)
- Emmanuel (GA) (6)
- Felician (5)
- Fort Hays State (4)
- Frostburg State (1)
- Gannon (1)
- Grand Valley State (8)
- Illinois Wesleyan (1)
- Iowa (10)
- King (TN) (4)
- Lehigh (5)
- Lindenwood (1)
- Lock Haven (4)
- Marymount (1)
- McKendree (10)
- Mount Olive (5)
- Mount Union (1)
- Muhlenberg (1)
- New England (1)
- New Jersey City (1)
- North Central (IL) (10)
- Northern Michigan (3)
- Norwich (1)
- Otterbein (1)
- Pitt–Johnstown (1)
- Presbyterian (10)
- Quincy (4)
- Sacred Heart (8)
- Simon Fraser (6)
- Simpson (2)
- Tiffin (1)
- Ursinus (2)
- Wartburg (7)
- Western New England (8)
- West Liberty (4)
- William Jewell (2)
- Wisconsin–Stevens Point (2)
- York (PA) (2)

== Team results ==
| Rank | Team | Points |
|---|---|---|
| 1st place, gold medalist(s) | McKendree | 171.0 |
| 2nd place, silver medalist(s) | Iowa | 166.0 |
| 3rd place, bronze medalist(s) | North Central (IL) | 123.5 |
| 4 | Grand Valley State | 110.5 |
| 5 | Presbyterian | 83.5 |
| 6 | Lehigh | 54.5 |
| 7 | King (TN) | 45.5 |
| 8 | Colorado Mesa | 41.5 |
| 9 | Quincy | 41.0 |
| 10 | East Stroudsburg | 40.0 |

== Individual results ==
| Weight | First | Second | Third | Fourth | Fifth | Sixth | Seventh | Eighth |
|---|---|---|---|---|---|---|---|---|
| 103 lbs | Val Solorio; Iowa | Rayana Sahagun; Grand Valley State | Genesis Ramirez; Aurora | Madison Avila; North Central (IL) | Trinity Pendergrass; Quincy | Heather Crull; McKendree | Alexis Winecke; Wisconsin-Stevens Point | Mia Zuniga; Colorado Mesa |
| 110 lbs | Audrey Jimenez; Lehigh | Sage Mortimer; Grand Valley State | Gabriele Tedesco; McKendree | Nyla Valencia; Iowa | Teegan Sibble; East Stroudsburg | Chloe Dearwester; Presbyterian | Avery Kibelbek; King (TN) | Adriana Gomez; Colorado Mesa |
| 117 lbs | Yu Sakamoto; McKendree | Riley Rayome; North Central (IL) | Brianna Gonzalez; Iowa | Karissa Turnwall; Emmanuel (GA) | Carleigh Czerneski; Adrian | Jenna Anderson; Presbyterian | Abigail Cooper; Lehigh | Gable Hemann; Wartburg |
| 124 lbs | Xochitl Mota-Pettis; Quincy | Shelby Moore; McKendree | Sara Sterner; North Central (IL) | Lorianna Piestewa; Colorado Mesa | Aspen Blanko; Grand Valley State | Belle Foard; King (TN) | Savannah Witt; Eastern | Alyssa Mahan; Presbyterian |
| 131 lbs | Cam Guerin; McKendree | Alexis Janiak; Aurora | Aubre Krazer; Lehigh | Cassia Zammit; West Liberty | Abigail Mozden; Mount Union | Janida Garcia; Emmanuel (GA) | Karlee Brooks; Iowa | Makayla Paclib; Pitt-Johnstown |
| 138 lbs | Katerina Lange; Grand Valley State | Claire DiCugno; North Central (IL) | Haylie Jaffe; McKendree | Lilly Luft; Iowa | Kylie Rule; Wartburg | Jacinda Espinosa; Lindenwood | Aine Moffit; Augustana (IL) | Ruby Julien-Newsom; King (TN) |
| 145 lbs | Bella Mir; North Central (IL) | Reese Larramendy; Iowa | Liv Wieber; Simon Fraser | Madeline Kubicki; Presbyterian | Annelise Obermark; Simpson | Alex Szkotnicki; McKendree | Margaret Buurma; Grand Valley State | Zoey Haines; Eastern |
| 160 lbs | Kennedy Blades; Iowa | Tiffani Baublitz; East Stroudsburg | Stella Steigler; King (TN) | Savannah Gomez; McKendree | May Cuyler; Presbyterian | Love Daley; Sacred Heart | Keeley Kehrli; Simpson | Noelle Gaffney; Grand Valley State |
| 180 lbs | Kylie Welker; Iowa | Destiny Rodriguez; McKendree | Shenita Lawson; North Central (IL) | Isabella Renfro; Fort Hays State | Isabella Phillips; Gannon | Azariah Moore; Lock Haven | Paige Maher; Simon Fraser | Mia Gaetjens; Adrian |
| 207 lbs | Tristan Kelly; McKendree | Sabrina Nauss; Grand Valley State | Rewa Chababo; Wartburg | Katja Osteen; Iowa | Jayleen Sekona; Colorado Mesa | Caroline Ward; North Central (IL) | Maria Aiono; Presbyterian | Josephine Larson; Sacred Heart |

=== Finals matches ===
| Weight | Champion | | Result | Runner-up | |
|---|---|---|---|---|---|
| 103 lbs | #3Val Solorio | Iowa | TF 13–1 | #4 Rayana Sahagun | Grand Valley State |
| 110 lbs | #1 Audrey Jimenez | Lehigh | Fall 1:50 | #2 Sage Mortimer | Grand Valley State |
| 117 lbs | #1 Yu Sakamoto | McKendree | Dec 4–3 | #3 Brock Hardy | North Central (IL) |
| 124 lbs | #3 Xochitl Mota-Pettis | Quincy | TF 10–0 | #4 Shelby Moore | McKendree |
| 131 lbs | #1 Cam Guerin | McKendree | Dec 5–5 (Criteria) | #3 Alexis Janiak | Aurora |
| 138 lbs | #1 Katerina Lange | Grand Valley State | Dec 4–1 | #2 Claire DiCugno | North Central (IL) |
| 145 lbs | #2 Bella Mir | North Central (IL) | Fall 2:26 | #1 Reese Larramendy | Iowa |
| 160 lbs | #1 Kennedy Blades | Iowa | Fall 1:19 | #3 Tiffani Baublitz | East Stroudsburg |
| 180 lbs | #1 Kylie Welker | Iowa | TF 11–0 | #2 Destiny Rodriguez | McKendree |
| 207 lbs | #1 Tristan Kelly | McKendree | TF 11–0 | #2 Sabrina Nauss | Grand Valley State |

== Medal table ==
| Rank | Team | First | Second | Third | Total |
|---|---|---|---|---|---|
| 1 | McKendree | 3 | 2 | 2 | 7 |
| 2 | Iowa | 3 | 1 | 1 | 5 |
| 3 | Grand Valley State | 1 | 3 | 0 | 4 |
| 4 | North Central (IL) | 1 | 2 | 2 | 5 |
| 5 | Lehigh | 1 | 0 | 1 | 2 |
| 6 | Quincy | 1 | 0 | 0 | 1 |
| 7 | Aurora | 0 | 1 | 1 | 2 |
| 8 | East Stroudsburg | 0 | 1 | 0 | 1 |
| 9 | King (TN) | 0 | 0 | 1 | 1 |
| 9 | Simon Fraser | 0 | 0 | 1 | 1 |
| 9 | Wartburg | 0 | 0 | 1 | 1 |
| Totals (11 entries) | | 10 | 10 | 10 | 30 |

== Awards ==
| Award | Recipient | Team | Ref. |
|---|---|---|---|
| NCAA Tournament Outstanding Wrestler | Audrey Jimenez | Lehigh | |
| National Tournament Coach of the Year | Alexio Garcia | McKendree | |
