= 2024 U23 World Wrestling Championships – Men's freestyle 74 kg =

Wrestling competitions

Men's freestyle 74 kg at the 2024 U23 World Championships
- Venue: Tirana Olympic Park
- Dates: 25–26 October
- Competitors: 21 from 19 nations

Medalists
gold medal	Kota Takahashi	Japan
silver medal	Orozobek Toktomambetov	Kyrgyzstan
bronze medal	Dzhabrail Gadzhiev	Azerbaijan
bronze medal	Mitchell Mesenbrink	United States

The men's freestyle 74 kilograms is a competition featured at the 2024 U23 World Wrestling Championships, and will be held in Tirana, Albania on 25 and 26 October 2024.

This freestyle wrestling competition consists of a single-elimination tournament, with a repechage used to determine the winner of two bronze medals. The two finalists face off for gold and silver medals. Each wrestler who loses to one of the two finalists moves into the repechage, culminating in a pair of bronze medal matches featuring the semifinal losers each facing the remaining repechage opponent from their half of the bracket.

== Results ==
Legend

- F — Won by fall

=== Final ===
Final
Orozobek Toktomambetov (KGZ)	1
Kota Takahashi (JPN)	3

=== Top half ===
Round of 32
Stas David Wolf (GER)	3
Dzhabrail Gadzhiev (AZE)	9
Narek Harutyunyan (ARM)	5
Nikita Dmitrijevs Mayeuski (AIN)	2
Tymur Hudyma (UKR)	0
Ismail Khaniev (AIN)	10

Round of 16
Sukhpal Jinjala (IND)	0
İsmet Çiftçi (TUR)	10
Dzhabrail Gadzhiev (AZE)	1
Orozobek Toktomambetov (KGZ)	4
Zhu Xiaobing (CHN)	0
Narek Harutyunyan (ARM)	5
Ismail Khaniev (AIN)	10
César Alvan (BRA)	0

Quarterfinals
İsmet Çiftçi (TUR)	0
Orozobek Toktomambetov (KGZ)	11
Narek Harutyunyan (ARM)	0
Ismail Khaniev (AIN)	11

Semifinals
Orozobek Toktomambetov (KGZ)	1
Ismail Khaniev (AIN)	1

=== Bottom half ===
Round of 32
Patrik Leder (CAN)	6
Batsükhiin Batbayar (MGL)	9
Ali Rezaei (IRI)	3
Kota Takahashi (JPN)	11

Round of 16
Rayanne Essaidi (MAR)	2
Luka Chkhitunidze (GEO)	8
Batsükhiin Batbayar (MGL)	0
Magomedrasul Asluev (BRN)	9
Bradley Fulmer (AUS)	0
Kota Takahashi (JPN)	10
Mitchell Mesenbrink (USA)	7
Murat Dzhakupov (KAZ)	2

Quarterfinals
Luka Chkhitunidze (GEO)	1
Magomedrasul Asluev (BRN)	6
Kota Takahashi (JPN)	11
Mitchell Mesenbrink (USA)	8

Semifinals
Magomedrasul Asluev (BRN)	1
Kota Takahashi (JPN)	5

=== Repechage ===
Repechage round 1
Ali Rezaei (IRI)	10
Bradley Fulmer (AUS)	0

Repechage round 2
Dzhabrail Gadzhiev (AZE)	11
İsmet Çiftçi (TUR)	3
Ali Rezaei (IRI)	7
Mitchell Mesenbrink (USA)	16

Bronze medals
Dzhabrail Gadzhiev (AZE)	8
Ismail Khaniev (AIN)	6
Mitchell Mesenbrink (USA)	6
Magomedrasul Asluev (BRN)	0

== Final standing ==
Rank	Athlete
1st place, gold medalist(s)	Kota Takahashi (JPN)
2nd place, silver medalist(s)	Orozobek Toktomambetov (KGZ)
3rd place, bronze medalist(s)	Dzhabrail Gadzhiev (AZE)
3rd place, bronze medalist(s)	Mitchell Mesenbrink (USA)
5	Ismail Khaniev (AIN)
5	Magomedrasul Asluev (BRN)
7	Ali Rezaei (IRI)
8	Narek Harutyunyan (ARM)
9	İsmet Çiftçi (TUR)
10	Luka Chkhitunidze (GEO)
11	Batsükhiin Batbayar (MGL)
12	Patrik Leder (CAN)
13	Stas David Wolf (GER)
14	Nikita Dmitrijevs Mayeuski (AIN)
15	Murat Dzhakupov (KAZ)
16	Rayanne Essaidi (MAR)
17	Zhu Xiaobing (CHN)
18	Sukhpal Jinjala (IND)
19	Tymur Hudyma (UKR)
20	César Alvan (BRA)
21	Bradley Fulmer (AUS)
