= Dzhabrail Gadzhiev =

Azerbaijani amateur wrestler

Dzhabrail Gadzhiev Джабраил Гаджиев
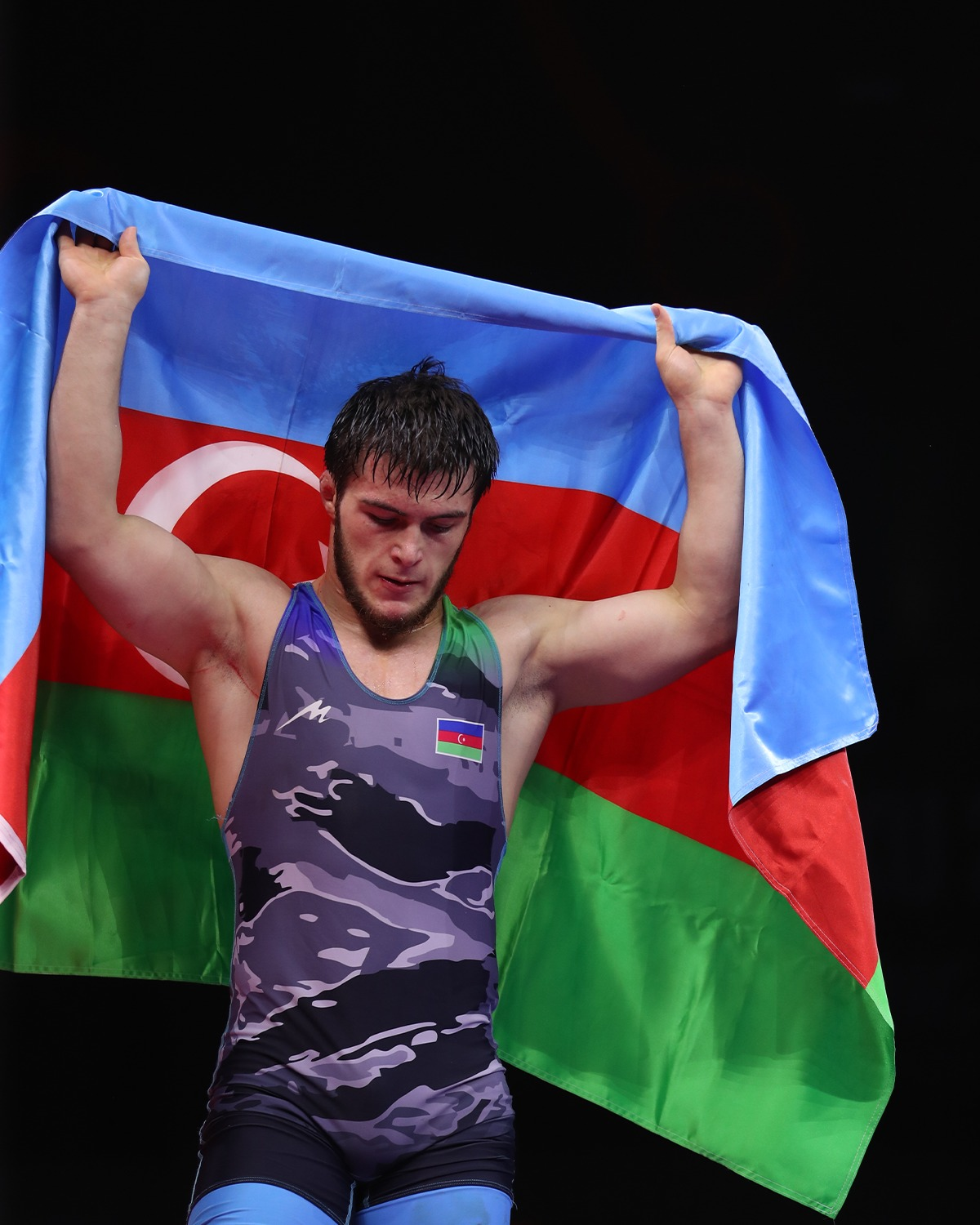

Personal information
- Full name: Dzhabrail Gadzhiradzhabovich Gadzhiev
- Nationality: Russian; Azerbaijani
- Born: 18 February 2002 (age 24) Akhty, Dagestan, Russia
- Height: 1.75 m (5 ft 9 in)
- Weight: 74 kg (163 lb)

Sport
- Country: Azerbaijan
- Sport: Wrestling
- Event: Freestyle
- Club: Abdulali Ganiev's wrestling club
- Coached by: Vakhid Mamedov
Medal record
Men's freestyle wrestling
Representing the Azerbaijan
Dan Kolov & Nikola Petrov Tournament
Gold medal – first place	2022 Veliko Tarnovo	74 kg
Grand Prix
Gold medal – first place	2021 Yakutsk	70 kg
Silver medal – second place	2021 Kiev	70 kg
Silver medal – second place	2023 Bishkek	74 kg
Silver medal – second place	2023 Warsaw	74 kg
Bronze medal – third place	2023 Zagreb	74 kg
Bronze medal – third place	2024 Zagreb	74 kg
CIS Games
Gold medal – first place	2023 Soligorsk	74 kg
World U23 Championships
Bronze medal – third place	2024 Tirana	74 kg
U23 European Championships
Gold medal – first place	2021 Skopje	70 kg
Gold medal – first place	2022 Plovdiv	74 kg
Gold medal – first place	2024 Baku	74 kg
European Junior Championships
Gold medal – first place	2021 Dortmund	74 kg
U-20 World Championships
Gold medal – first place	2022 Sofia	74 kg
Silver medal – second place	2021 Ufa	70 kg
European Youth Olympic Festival
Gold medal – first place	2019 Baku	65 kg
Cadet World Championships
Gold medal – first place	2019 Sofia	65 kg
Cadet European Championships
Silver medal – second place	2019 Faenza	65 kg

Dzhabrail Gadzhiradzhabovich Gadzhiev (Russian: Джабраил Гаджираджабович Гаджиев; born 18 February 2002 in Dagestan) is a Russian-born Azerbaijani freestyle wrestler of Lezgin heritage, who claimed the gold medal at the 2023 CIS Games and 2019 European Youth Summer Olympic Festival.

== Background ==
Gadzhiev was born and raised in Akhty village, Akhtynsky District, Dagestan, Russia into a Lezgin family. He started wrestling at young age in Abdulali Ganiev's wrestling club. At the age of 17 he moved to Baku, Azerbaijan. His personal coach here became Vakhid Mamedov, who previously had coached the Olympic champion Namig Abdullayev.

== Career ==
In June 2019, he won the silver medal at the cadet European championships in Faenza, Italy. In July 2019, he earned the gold medal at the 2019 European Youth Summer Olympic Festival in Baku, Azerbaijan. In July 2019, Gadzhiev claimed the gold medal for Azerbaijan team at the cadet world championships in Sofia, Bulgaria In May 2021, he won the Roman Dmitriyev's junior international tournament in Yakutsk, Russia and the U23 European championships at 65 kilos, held in Skopje, North Macedonia. In June 2021, he finished in first place at the European Junior Championships in Dortmund, Germany In August 2021, he came second at the 2021 World Junior Championships in Ufa, Russia at 70 kg. In December 2021, he became a runner-up at the senior Azerbaijan national championships at 74 kilos. In 2022, Dzhabrail won the U23 European Championships for the second time at 74 kilos. In 2023, he took the gold medal at the CIS Games in Belarus.

On April 24, 2026, at the European Championship in Tirana, Dzhabrail Gadzhiev (79 kg) defeated 2021 European Champion and 2024 World medalist Akhsarbek Gulaev (Slovakia) and advanced to the semifinals. On April 25, 2026, he won against 2021 Russia′s Dagestan Republican Champion Rasul Shapiev (North Macedonia) with a score of 8:0 and won a bronze medal.

== Championships and achievements ==
- 2019 Cadet European Championships — 2nd.
- 2019 European Youth Summer Olympic Festival — 1st.
- 2019 Cadet World Championships — 1st.
- 2021 U23 European championships — 1st.
- 2021 Junior European championships — 1st.
- 2021 World Junior Championships — 2nd.
- 2021 Azerbaijan national championships — 2nd.
- 2022 U23 European championships — 1st.
- 2023 CIS Games — 1st.
