= Audrey Jimenez =

American freestyle wrestler (born 2005)

Personal information
- Full name: Audrey Rae Jimenez
- Born: December 18, 2005 (age 20) Tucson, Arizona, U.S.

Sport
- Country: United States
- Sport: Amateur wrestling
- Weight class: 50 kg
- Events: Freestyle and Folkstyle wrestling
Medal record
Women's freestyle wrestling
Representing United States
Pan American Championships
| Gold medal – first place | 2025 Monterrey | 50 kg |
| Bronze medal – third place | 2024 Acapulco | 50 kg |
U23 World Championships
| Silver medal – second place | 2023 Tirana | 50 kg |
| Silver medal – second place | 2025 Novi Sad | 50 kg |
U20 World Championships
| Silver medal – second place | 2022 Sofia | 50 kg |
| Silver medal – second place | 2023 Amman | 50 kg |
| Silver medal – second place | 2025 Samokov | 50 kg |
U15 Pan American Championships
| Gold medal – first place | 2019 Panama City | 39 kg |

Audrey Rae Jimenez (born December 18, 2005) is an American freestyle and folkstyle wrestler. She is a gold medalist at the Pan American Wrestling Championships.

== Career ==
=== High school ===
Born in Tucson, Arizona, Jimenez attended Sunnyside High School, where she became a four-time Division I Arizona state champion, with her first three titles against girls, and her last one against boys in the 106 lb (48 kg) category, becoming the first girl to do so. Prior to her graduation, she committed to wrestle for Lehigh University.

In freestyle, Jimenez won a gold medal at the 2019 U15 Pan American Wrestling Championships in the 39 kg category. She won a silver medal from the 2022 and 2023 U20 World Championships, as well as the 2023 U23 World Wrestling Championships. She then won a bronze medal at the 2024 Pan American Wrestling Championships.

=== 2025 ===
In May 2025, Jimenez won a gold medal at the Pan American Wrestling Championships. In August, at the U20 World Wrestling Championships, she won the silver medal in the 50 kg category. The following month, Jimenez made her senior international debut at the 2025 World Wrestling Championships, where she was eliminated by Emanuela Liuzzi in the round of 16. In October, she competed in the 2025 U23 World Wrestling Championships and won a silver medal.

=== 2026 ===
In March 2026, Jimenez won the NCAA Women’s Wrestling Championships in the 110 lb category. A month later, she was awarded the Anthony-Maroulis Trophy.

== Championships and accomplishments ==
=== Freestyle wrestling ===
- NCAA
  - 2026 NCAA Women’s Wrestling Champion - 110 lbs.
- USA Wrestling
  - 2026 Anthony-Maroulis Trophy
