= Mitchell Mesenbrink =

American wrestler (born 2003)

Personal information
- Full name: Mitchell Owen Mesenbrink
- Born: June 2, 2003 (age 23) Hartland, Wisconsin, U.S.

Sport
- Country: United States
- Sport: Wrestling
- Weight class: 74 kg (163 lb)
- Events: Freestyle and Folkstyle
- College team: Penn State Nittany Lions; California Baptist Lancers (formerly)
- Club: Nittany Lion Wrestling Club; Askren Wrestling Academy (formerly)
- Coached by: Cael Sanderson; Ben Askren (formerly)
Medal record
Men's freestyle wrestling
Representing the United States
US National Championships
Gold medal – first place	2025 Las Vegas	74 kg
World U23 Championships
Gold medal – first place	2025 Novi Sad	74 kg
Bronze medal – third place	2024 Tirana	74 kg
U20 World Championships
Gold medal – first place	2023 Jordan	74 kg
Silver medal – second place	2022 Sofia	70 kg
Junior Pan American Games
Gold medal – first place	2025 Asunción	74 kg
U20 Pan American Championships
Gold medal – first place	2022 Acapulco	70 kg
Gold medal – first place	2023 Santiago	74 kg
Men's collegiate wrestling
Representing the Penn State Nittany Lions
NCAA Division I Championships
Gold medal – first place	2026 Cleveland	165 lb
Gold medal – first place	2025 Philadelphia	165 lb
Silver medal – second place	2024 Kansas City	165 lb
Big Ten Championships
Gold medal – first place	2024 College Park	165 lb
Gold medal – first place	2025 Evanston	165 lb
Gold medal – first place	2026 State College	165 lb

Mitchell Owen Mesenbrink (born June 2, 2003) is an American freestyle and folkstyle wrestler who competes at 74 kilograms. In freestyle, he is a U.S. national champion, a bronze medalist at the U23 World Championships in 2024, and at the U20 World Championships, he claimed a gold medal in 2023 and a silver medal in 2022.

In folkstyle, he was a 2026 and 2025 NCAA Division I national champion for the Penn State Nittany Lions, as well as the 2024 runner-up. Mesenbrink won the 2026 Dan Hodge Trophy, awarded annually to the United States of America’s best college wrestler.

== Career ==
=== Early life ===
Born in Hartland, Wisconsin, Mesenbrink started wrestling at a young age, following the footsteps of his father, John Mesenbrink, a former wrestler at Drake University. Mesenbrink attended Arrowhead High School, where he became a three-time Wisconsin Division I state champion and broke into the national high school rankings. Before his senior season, he committed to wrestle for California Baptist University.

In freestyle, Mesenbrink claimed a silver medal from the U20 World Championships and a gold medal from the U20 Pan American Championships and U20 US National Championships in 2022, at 70 kilograms.

=== California Baptist University ===
==== 2022–2023 ====
Mesenbrink started the season at 2–0; however, he then entered the transfer portal and moved back to Wisconsin, closing his freshman year. In April 2023, he committed to the Penn State.

=== Pennsylvania State University ===
==== 2023–2024 ====
Before the folkstyle season, Mesenbrink made the jump to 74 kilograms and repeated as U20 US national champion and U20 Pan American champion before competing at the U20 World Championships. He once again reached the finals of the tournament, this time becoming the U20 world champion at 74 kilograms.

Starting at 165 pounds, Mesenbrink claimed titles at the Journeymen Classic and Black Knight Invitational, and racked up an undefeated 12–0 dual-meet record during regular season. At the Big Ten Championships, Mesenbrink claimed his first title with a come-from-behind victory over two-time All-American Dean Hamiti. At the NCAA tournament, Mesenbrink defeated All-Americans Cam Amine and Michael Caliendo in rematches, to make the finals, where he fell to NCAA champion David Carr to take runner-up honors.

In April, Mesenbrink made his senior level debut at the US Olympic Team Trials, where after a win over U17 World champion Ladarion Lockett, he fell to seven-time Olympic and World champion Jordan Burroughs in the semifinals. He then came back for third-place with wins over US National champion Quincy Monday and Jarrett Jacques, making the US National team.

==== 2024–2025 ====
Before the season started, Mesenbrink competed at the U23 World Championships, claiming a bronze medal by defeating Asian medalist Magomedrasul Asluev from Bahrain.

Back to folkstyle, Mesenbrink was undefeated through 27 matches, reaching the national finals once again though this time claiming the 2025 NCAA title, as well as the Big Ten Conference title.

Fresh off an NCAA championship run, Mesenbrink became the US National champion in freestyle, notably defeating two-time NCAA champion David Carr in a rematch from their 2024 NCAA finale, as well as NCAA finalist Quincy Monday. A rematch against Carr in a best-of-three format took place at Final X, on June 14, in which he dropped two bouts in a row to claim runner-up honors.

== Freestyle record ==
Senior Freestyle Matches
Res.	Record	Opponent	Score	Date	Event	Location
2025 U23 World Championships (gold) at 74 kg
Win	19-4	(Turkey) Muhammed Ozmuş	TF 12-2	October 24–25, 2025	2025 U23 World Championships	Novi Sad, Serbia
Win	18-4	(Japan) Yoshinosuke Aoyagi	7-4	October 24–25, 2025	2025 U23 World Championships	Novi Sad, Serbia
Win	17-4	(Egypt) Omar Mourad	TF 12-2	October 24–25, 2025	2025 U23 World Championships	Novi Sad, Serbia
Win	16-4	(India) Parvinder Nain	TF 10-0	October 24–25, 2025	2025 U23 World Championships	Novi Sad, Serbia
Win	15-4	Aliaksandr Hulnik	TF 12-2	October 24–25, 2025	2025 U23 World Championships	Novi Sad, Serbia
2025 Junior Pan American Games (gold) at 74 kg
Win	14-4	(Cuba) Orislandy Perdomo	TF 10-0	August 22, 2025	2025 Junior Pan American Games	Asunción, Paraguay
Win	13-4	(Venezuela) Ricardo Oyoque	TF 11-0	August 22, 2025	2025 Junior Pan American Games	Asunción, Paraguay
Win	12-4	(Argentina) Arnoldo Proboste	TF 11–0	August 22, 2025	2025 Junior Pan American Games	Asunción, Paraguay
2025 US World Team Trials (silver) at 74 kg
Loss	11–4	(United States) David Carr	4–4	June 14, 2025	2025 Final X	(United States) Newark, New Jersey
Loss	11–3	(United States) David Carr	3–4	June 14, 2025	2025 Final X	(United States) Newark, New Jersey
2025 US Open (gold) at 74 kg
Win	11–2	(United States) David Carr	TF 16–6	April 25–26, 2025	2025 US Open National Championships	(United States) Las Vegas, Nevada
Win	10–2	(United States) Quincy Monday	TF 12–1	April 25–26, 2025	2025 US Open National Championships	(United States) Las Vegas, Nevada
Win	9–2	(United States) Jesse Dellavecchia	TF 10–0	April 25–26, 2025	2025 US Open National Championships	(United States) Las Vegas, Nevada
Win	8–2	(United States) Max Brignola	TF 10–0	April 25–26, 2025	2025 US Open National Championships	(United States) Las Vegas, Nevada
Win	7–2	(United States) DeShon Gallegos	TF 10–0	April 25–26, 2025	2025 US Open National Championships	(United States) Las Vegas, Nevada
2024 U23 World Championships (bronze) at 74 kg
Win	6–2	(Bahrain) Magomedrasul Asluev	6–0	October 25–26, 2024	2024 U23 World Championships	Tirana, Albania
Win	5–2	(Iran) Ali Rezaei	16–7	October 25–26, 2024	2024 U23 World Championships	Tirana, Albania
Loss	4–2	(Japan) Kota Takahashi	8–11	October 25–26, 2024	2024 U23 World Championships	Tirana, Albania
Win	4–1	(Kazakhstan) Murat Dzhakupov	7–2	October 25–26, 2024	2024 U23 World Championships	Tirana, Albania
2024 US Olympic Team Trials (bronze) at 74 kg
Win	3–1	(United States) Jarrett Jacques	TF 10–0	April 19–20, 2024	2024 US Olympic Team Trials	(United States) State College, Pennsylvania
Win	2–1	(United States) Quincy Monday	TF 12–1	April 19–20, 2024	2024 US Olympic Team Trials	(United States) State College, Pennsylvania
Loss	1–1	(United States) Jordan Burroughs	3–8	April 19–20, 2024	2024 US Olympic Team Trials	(United States) State College, Pennsylvania
Win	1–0	(United States) Ladarion Lockett	TF 13–3	April 19–20, 2024	2024 US Olympic Team Trials	(United States) State College, Pennsylvania
