= 2022 U20 World Wrestling Championships =

2022 World Juniors Wrestling Championships
- Host city: Sofia, Bulgaria
- Dates: 15–21 August 2022
- Stadium: Armeets Arena

Champions
- Freestyle: Iran
- Greco-Roman: Iran
- Women: Japan

The 2022 World Junior Wrestling Championships (U20) was the 45th edition of the World Junior Wrestling Championships and was held in Sofia, Bulgaria between 15 and 21 August 2022.

== Competition schedule ==
All times are (UTC+3)

Date	Time	Event
15 August	11.00-14.30	Qualification rounds FS – 57-65-70-79-97 kg
15 August	18:00-19.30	Semi Final FS – 57-65-70-79-97 kg
16 August	11.30-14.30	Qualification rounds FS – 61-74-86-92-125 kg; Repechage FS – 57-65-70-79-97 kg
16 August	16.45-17.45	Semi Final FS – 61-74-86-92-125 kg
16 August	18.00-20.30	FS – 57-65-70-79-97 kg
17 August	11.00-13.30	Qualification rounds WW – 50-55-59-68-76 kg; Repechage FS – 61-74-86-92-125 kg
17 August	16.45-17.45	Semi Final WW – 50-55-59-68-76 kg
17 August	18.00-20.30	Finals FS – 61-74-86-92-125 kg
18 August	11.00-13.30	Qualification rounds WW – 53-57-62-65-72 kg; Repechage WW – 50-55-59-68-76 kg
18 August	17.00-17.45	Semi Final WW – 53-57-62-65-72 kg
18 August	18.00-20.00	Finals WW – 50-55-59-68-76 kg
19 August	11.00-15.30	Qualification rounds GR – 55-63-77-87-130 kg; Repechage WW – 53-57-62-65-72 kg
19 August	17.00-17.45	Semi-finals: GR – 55-63-77-87-130 kg
19 August	18.00-20.00	Finals WW – 53-57-62-65-72 kg
20 August	11.00-15.30	Qualification rounds GR – 60-67-72-82-97 kg; Repechage GR – 55-63-77-87-130 kg
20 August	17.00-17.45	Semi Final GR – 60-67-72-82-97 kg
20 August	18.00-21.00	Finals GR – 55-63-77-87-130 kg
21 August	16.00-17.45	Repechage GR – 60-67-72-82-97 kg
21 August	18.00-20.30	Finals GR – 60-67-72-82-97 kg
21 August	21.00	Final banquet

== Medal table ==
* Host nation (Bulgaria)

Rank	Nation	Gold	Silver	Bronze	Total
1	Japan	9	1	5	15
2	Iran	7	3	6	16
3	Azerbaijan	5	1	3	9
4	United States	3	4	4	11
5	India	1	4	11	16
6	Armenia	1	2	1	4
7	Ukraine	1	1	4	6
8	Uzbekistan	1	0	3	4
9	France	1	0	2	3
10	Germany	1	0	1	2
11	Kazakhstan	0	4	3	7
12	Georgia	0	3	2	5
13	Turkey	0	2	6	8
14	Kyrgyzstan	0	2	4	6
15	Hungary	0	1	2	3
16	Moldova	0	1	1	2
17	Romania	0	1	0	1
18	Estonia	0	0	1	1
18	Tunisia	0	0	1	1
Totals (19 entries)		30	30	60	120

== Team ranking ==
Rank	Men's freestyle		Men's Greco-Roman		Women's freestyle	
Rank	Team	Points	Team	Points	Team	Points
1	Iran	159	Iran	174	Japan	230
2	United States	132	Azerbaijan	119	India	160
3	India	112	Ukraine	93	United States	124
4	Azerbaijan	100	Armenia	83	Turkey	89
5	Georgia	98	Turkey	81	Ukraine	84
6	Turkey	78	Kazakhstan	78	Kazakhstan	71
7	Japan	60	Georgia	58	Hungary	56
8	France	57	Moldova	53	Kyrgyzstan	51
9	Ukraine	56	Kyrgyzstan	50	Poland	30
10	Uzbekistan	54	Uzbekistan	44	Uzbekistan	32

== Medal overview ==
=== Men's freestyle ===
Event	Gold	Silver	Bronze
57 kg	Jore Volk; United States	Merey Bazarbayev; Kazakhstan	Ahmad Javan; Iran
57 kg	Jore Volk; United States	Merey Bazarbayev; Kazakhstan	Abhishek Dhaka; India
61 kg	Yuto Nishiuchi; Japan	Armin Habibzadeh; Iran	Mohit Kumar; India
61 kg	Yuto Nishiuchi; Japan	Armin Habibzadeh; Iran	Khamzat Arsamerzouev; France
65 kg	Umidjon Jalolov; Uzbekistan	Ziraddin Bayramov; Azerbaijan	Yoshinosuke Aoyagi; Japan
65 kg	Umidjon Jalolov; Uzbekistan	Ziraddin Bayramov; Azerbaijan	Sujeet Kalkal; India
70 kg	Kanan Heybatov; Azerbaijan	Mitchell Mesenbrink; United States	Hossein Mohammad Aghaei; Iran
70 kg	Kanan Heybatov; Azerbaijan	Mitchell Mesenbrink; United States	Mulayam Yadav; India
74 kg	Dzhabrail Gadzhiev; Azerbaijan	Ryunosuke Kamiya; Japan	Sagar Jaglan; India
74 kg	Dzhabrail Gadzhiev; Azerbaijan	Ryunosuke Kamiya; Japan	Jafar Chuliboyev; Uzbekistan
79 kg	Sobhan Yari; Iran	Mushegh Mkrtchyan; Armenia	Otari Adeishvili; Georgia
79 kg	Sobhan Yari; Iran	Mushegh Mkrtchyan; Armenia	Mukhammad Abdullaev; Kyrgyzstan
86 kg	Rakhim Magamadov; France	Bennett Berge; United States	Aref Ranjbari; Iran
86 kg	Rakhim Magamadov; France	Bennett Berge; United States	İsmail Küçüksolak; Turkey
92 kg	Amir Hossein Firouzpour; Iran	Andro Margishvili; Georgia	Sergey Sargsyan; Armenia
92 kg	Amir Hossein Firouzpour; Iran	Andro Margishvili; Georgia	Adlan Viskhanov; France
97 kg	Ben Kueter; United States	Rıfat Gıdak; Turkey	Neeraj Bhardwaj; India
97 kg	Ben Kueter; United States	Rıfat Gıdak; Turkey	Amir Ali Azarpira; Iran
125 kg	Amir Reza Masoumi; Iran	Mahendra Gaikwad; India	Merab Suleimanishvili; Georgia
125 kg	Amir Reza Masoumi; Iran	Mahendra Gaikwad; India	Adil Mısırcı; Turkey

=== Greco-Roman ===
Event	Gold	Silver	Bronze
55 kg	Nihad Guluzade; Azerbaijan	Denis Mihai; Romania	Nuristan Suiorkulov; Kyrgyzstan
55 kg	Nihad Guluzade; Azerbaijan	Denis Mihai; Romania	Taiga Onishi; Japan
60 kg	Saeid Esmaeili; Iran	Suren Aghajanyan; Armenia	Nihat Mammadli; Azerbaijan
60 kg	Saeid Esmaeili; Iran	Suren Aghajanyan; Armenia	Sumit Dalal; India
63 kg	Iman Mohammadi; Iran	Baiaman Karimov; Kyrgyzstan	Chiezo Maruyama; Japan
63 kg	Iman Mohammadi; Iran	Baiaman Karimov; Kyrgyzstan	Oleh Khalilov; Ukraine
67 kg	Kanan Abdullazade; Azerbaijan	Nika Broladze; Georgia	Dinmukhamed Koshkar; Kazakhstan
67 kg	Kanan Abdullazade; Azerbaijan	Nika Broladze; Georgia	Danial Sohrabi; Iran
72 kg	Gurban Gurbanov; Azerbaijan	Alexandru Solovei; Moldova	Irfan Mirzoiev; Ukraine
72 kg	Gurban Gurbanov; Azerbaijan	Alexandru Solovei; Moldova	Amir Abdi; Iran
77 kg	Deni Nakaev; Germany	Yüksel Sarıçiçek; Turkey	Samandar Bobonazarov; Uzbekistan
77 kg	Deni Nakaev; Germany	Yüksel Sarıçiçek; Turkey	Alexandrin Guțu; Moldova
82 kg	Alireza Mohmadi; Iran	Achiko Bolkvadze; Georgia	Rohit Dahiya; India
82 kg	Alireza Mohmadi; Iran	Achiko Bolkvadze; Georgia	Alperen Berber; Turkey
87 kg	Vigen Nazaryan; Armenia	Abolfazl Choubani; Iran	Lachin Valiyev; Azerbaijan
87 kg	Vigen Nazaryan; Armenia	Abolfazl Choubani; Iran	Maksat Sailau; Kazakhstan
97 kg	Ali Abedi; Iran	Iussuf Matsiyev; Kazakhstan	Richard Karelson; Estonia
97 kg	Ali Abedi; Iran	Iussuf Matsiyev; Kazakhstan	Nurmanbet Raimaly Uulu; Kyrgyzstan
130 kg	Mykhailo Vyshnyvetskyi; Ukraine	Fardin Hedayati; Iran	Temurbek Nasimov; Uzbekistan
130 kg	Mykhailo Vyshnyvetskyi; Ukraine	Fardin Hedayati; Iran	Aden Attao; United States

=== Women's freestyle ===
Event	Gold	Silver	Bronze
50 kg	Umi Ito; Japan	Audrey Jimenez; United States	Priyanshi Prajapat; India
50 kg	Umi Ito; Japan	Audrey Jimenez; United States	Gultakin Shirinova; Azerbaijan
53 kg	Antim Panghal; India	Altyn Shagayeva; Kazakhstan	Ayaka Kimura; Japan
53 kg	Antim Panghal; India	Altyn Shagayeva; Kazakhstan	Katie Gomez; United States
55 kg	Moe Kiyooka; Japan	Albina Rillia; Ukraine	Róza Szenttamási; Hungary
55 kg	Moe Kiyooka; Japan	Albina Rillia; Ukraine	Tuba Demir; Turkey
57 kg	Ruka Natami; Japan	Sofia Macaluso; United States	Oleksandra Khomenets; Ukraine
57 kg	Ruka Natami; Japan	Sofia Macaluso; United States	Sito; India
59 kg	Sakura Motoki; Japan	Viktória Borsos; Hungary	Ebru Dağbaşı; Turkey
59 kg	Sakura Motoki; Japan	Viktória Borsos; Hungary	Madina Aman; Kazakhstan
62 kg	Nonoka Ozaki; Japan	Sonam Malik; India	Adaugo Nwachukwu; United States
62 kg	Nonoka Ozaki; Japan	Sonam Malik; India	Iryna Bondar; Ukraine
65 kg	Mahiro Yoshitake; Japan	Priyanka; India	Dilnaz Sazanova; Kyrgyzstan
65 kg	Mahiro Yoshitake; Japan	Priyanka; India	Khadija Jlassi; Tunisia
68 kg	Ami Ishii; Japan	Nurzat Nurtaeva; Kyrgyzstan	Nesrin Baş; Turkey
68 kg	Ami Ishii; Japan	Nurzat Nurtaeva; Kyrgyzstan	Sophia Schäfle; Germany
72 kg	Amit Elor; United States	Anastassiya Panassovich; Kazakhstan	Sumire Niikura; Japan
72 kg	Amit Elor; United States	Anastassiya Panassovich; Kazakhstan	Reetika Hooda; India
76 kg	Ayano Moro; Japan	Priya Malik; India	Veronika Nyikos; Hungary
76 kg	Ayano Moro; Japan	Priya Malik; India	Tristan Kelly; United States

== Participating nations ==
562 wrestlers from 49 countries:

1. Algeria (5)
2. Armenia (19)
3. Austria (3)
4. Azerbaijan (20)
5. Belgium (3)
6. Brazil (3)
7. Bulgaria (24) (Host)
8. Canada (11)
9. Chile (3)
10. Croatia (4)
11. Czech Republic (7)
12. Egypt (13)
13. Spain (2)
14. Estonia (5)
15. Finland (5)
16. France (8)
17. United Kingdom (1)
18. Georgia (20)
19. Germany (11)
20. Greece (13)
21. Guatemala (2)
22. Hungary (17)
23. India (30)
24. Iran (20)
25. Israel (3)
26. Italy (11)
27. Japan (27)
28. Kazakhstan (30)
29. Kyrgyzstan (22)
30. South Korea (7)
31. Kosovo (2)
32. Lithuania (7)
33. Moldova (15)
34. Mexico (6)
35. Mongolia (4)
36. Norway (6)
37. Poland (18)
38. Romania (15)
39. South Africa (6)
40. Serbia (4)
41. Switzerland (5)
42. Sweden (8)
43. Tajikistan (2)
44. Chinese Taipei (6)
45. Tunisia (2)
46. Turkey (30)
47. Ukraine (28)
48. United States (30)
49. Uzbekistan (19)
