= 2023 European Juniors Wrestling Championships – Men's Greco-Roman =

The Men's Greco-Roman competitions at the 2023 European Juniors Wrestling Championships were held in Santiago de Compostela, Spain between 26 and 28 June 2023.

== Men's Greco-Roman 55 kg ==
26 and 27 June

Legend

- F — Won by fall

Final

Final
Elmir Aliyev (AZE)	10
Marko Voloshyn (UKR)	0

Top half

Round of 32
James Castaño (ESP)	0
Elmir Aliyev (AZE)	9

Round of 16
Paolo Milkov (BUL)	0
Muhammet Emin Çakır (TUR)	8
Elmir Aliyev (AZE)	7
Ilian Ainaoui (FRA)	0
Homeros Arakelyan (ARM)	8
Amare Fetene (ISR)	0
Tamazi Glonti (GEO)	4^{F}
Edmond Domokos (HUN)	0

Quarterfinals
Muhammet Emin Çakır (TUR)	1
Elmir Aliyev (AZE)	10
Homeros Arakelyan (ARM)	7^{F}
Tamazi Glonti (GEO)	6

Semifinals
Elmir Aliyev (AZE)	8
Homeros Arakelyan (ARM)	0

Bottom half

Round of 32

Round of 16
Ilias Zairakis (GRE)	5
Filip Bartošík (CZE)	6
Joni Pitkänen (FIN)	10
Andrea Martino (ITA)	0
Marko Voloshyn (UKR)	8
Mateusz Ropiak (POL)	0
Anatolie Tincu (MDA)	6
Lukas Benzing (GER)	17

Quarterfinals
Filip Bartošík (CZE)	1
Joni Pitkänen (FIN)	7
Marko Voloshyn (UKR)	10
Lukas Benzing (GER)	2

Semifinals
Joni Pitkänen (FIN)	0
Marko Voloshyn (UKR)	8

Repechage round 1
James Castaño (ESP)	11
Ilian Ainaoui (FRA)	8

Repechage round 2
James Castaño (ESP)	0
Muhammet Emin Çakır (TUR)	9
Mateusz Ropiak (POL)	4
Lukas Benzing (GER)	8^{F}

Bronze medal match
Muhammet Emin Çakır (TUR)	6
Homeros Arakelyan (ARM)	16
Lukas Benzing (GER)	8
Joni Pitkänen (FIN)	0

== Men's Greco-Roman 60 kg ==
27 and 28 June

Legend

- F — Won by fall

Final

Final
Anri Khozrevanidze (GEO)	6
Suren Aghajanyan (ARM)	1

Top half

Round of 32
Anri Khozrevanidze (GEO)	7
Dániel Rafael (HUN)	3

Round of 16
Kemal Sevgili (TUR)	5
Mathias Martinetti (SUI)	2
Anri Khozrevanidze (GEO)	9
Vilius Adomavičius (LTU)	0
Ilkin Gurbanov (AZE)	6
Grisha Nazaryan (BUL)	1
Pavel Denisenco (MDA)	3
Algot Gamelius (SWE)	7

Quarterfinals
Kemal Sevgili (TUR)	1
Anri Khozrevanidze (GEO)	4
Ilkin Gurbanov (AZE)	10
Algot Gamelius (SWE)	1

Semifinals
Anri Khozrevanidze (GEO)	3
Ilkin Gurbanov (AZE)	2

Bottom half

Round of 32

Round of 16
Melkamu Fetene (ISR)	0
Suren Aghajanyan (ARM)	8
Lucas Lo Grasso (FRA)	0
Danyil Bytka (UKR)	9
Bilal Mouskhabov (BEL)	0
Olivier Skrzypczak (POL)	4^{F}
Miguel Santos (POR)	0
Gorka Gracia (ESP)	5^{F}

Quarterfinals
Suren Aghajanyan (ARM)	8^{F}
Danyil Bytka (UKR)	3
Olivier Skrzypczak (POL)	8
Gorka Gracia (ESP)	0

Semifinals
Suren Aghajanyan (ARM)	8
Olivier Skrzypczak (POL)	1

Repechage round 1
Dániel Rafael (HUN)	3^{F}
Vilius Adomavičius (LTU)	0

Repechage round 2
Dániel Rafael (HUN)	0
Kemal Sevgili (TUR)	8
Melkamu Fetene (ISR)	9
Danyil Bytka (UKR)	0

Bronze medal match
Kemal Sevgili (TUR)	2
Ilkin Gurbanov (AZE)	1
Melkamu Fetene (ISR)	11
Olivier Skrzypczak (POL)	2

== Men's Greco-Roman 63 kg ==
26 and 27 June

Legend

- C — Won by 3 cautions given to the opponent
- F — Won by fall

Main bracket

Round of 16
Danylo Nakaliuzhnyi (UKR)	0
Rati Khozrevanidze (GEO)	7
Yurik Hoveyan (ARM)	9
Matouš Jankovič (CZE)	0
Faraim Mustafayev (AZE)	9
Hristiyan Ivanov (BUL)	0
Janis Heinzelbecker (GER)	0
William Reenberg (DEN)	9
Tuukka Peltokangas (FIN)	0
Vitalie Eriomenco (MDA)	9

Quarterfinals
Furkan Erken (TUR)	7^{C}
Rati Khozrevanidze (GEO)	0
Yurik Hoveyan (ARM)	8
Faraim Mustafayev (AZE)	5
Ilias Ayhan (SWE)	1
William Reenberg (DEN)	1
Vitalie Eriomenco (MDA)	7
Bredi Slinkers (NED)	0

Semifinals
Furkan Erken (TUR)	1
Yurik Hoveyan (ARM)	12'
Ilias Ayhan (SWE)	0
Vitalie Eriomenco (MDA)	8

Final
Yurik Hoveyan (ARM)	5
Vitalie Eriomenco (MDA)	5

Repechage round
Matouš Jankovič (CZE)	0
Faraim Mustafayev (AZE)	3
Tuukka Peltokangas (FIN)	0
Bredi Slinkers (NED)	8

Bronze medals
Faraim Mustafayev (AZE)	13
Furkan Erken (TUR)	10
Bredi Slinkers (NED)	6
Ilias Ayhan (SWE)	3

== Men's Greco-Roman 67 kg ==
27 and 28 June

Legend

- F — Won by fall

Final

Final
Azat Sarıyar (TUR)	4
Nika Broladze (GEO)	1

Top half

Round of 32
Tim Bergfalk (SWE)	10
Daniel Campos (ESP)	0
Gaspar Terteryan (ARM)	5
Leonard Iuraşcu (ROU)	0
Artur Jeremejev (EST)	1
Marian Holubovskyi (UKR)	1

Round of 16
Azat Sarıyar (TUR)	3^{F}
Magomed Gatagajev (FRA)	2
Tim Bergfalk (SWE)	10
Dimitar Georgiev (BUL)	0
Dalgat Magomedov (CZE)	0
Gaspar Terteryan (ARM)	8
Artur Jeremejev (EST)	1
Nestori Mannila (FIN)	3

Quarterfinals
Azat Sarıyar (TUR)	7
Tim Bergfalk (SWE)	0
Gaspar Terteryan (ARM)	7
Nestori Mannila (FIN)	1

Semifinals
Azat Sarıyar (TUR)	3
Gaspar Terteryan (ARM)	2

Bottom half

Round of 32
Johann Engelhardt (GER)	8
Isa Bektemirov (AUT)	0
Alexander Menahem Kostuk (ISR)	0
Donatas Rindeikis (LTU)	9

Round of 16
Zsolt Takács (HUN)	0
Kanan Abdullazade (AZE)	6
Johann Engelhardt (GER)	0
Fritz Reber (SUI)	10
Nika Broladze (GEO)	9
Donatas Rindeikis (LTU)	0
Arslanbek Salimov (POL)	19
Luka Ivančić (CRO)	11

Quarterfinals
Kanan Abdullazade (AZE)	8
Fritz Reber (SUI)	0
Nika Broladze (GEO)	10
Arslanbek Salimov (POL)	5

Semifinals
Kanan Abdullazade (AZE)	1
Nika Broladze (GEO)	7^{F}

Repechage round 2
Magomed Gatagajev (FRA)	5
Tim Bergfalk (SWE)	4
Donatas Rindeikis (LTU)	0
Arslanbek Salimov (POL)	8

Bronze medals
Magomed Gatagajev (FRA)	4
Gaspar Terteryan (ARM)	5
Arslanbek Salimov (POL)	5
Kanan Abdullazade (AZE)	6

== Men's Greco-Roman 72 kg ==
27 and 28 June

Legend

- F — Won by fall

Final

Final
Levente Lévai (HUN)	3
Ruslan Nurullayev (AZE)	5

Top half

Round of 32
Rokas Čepauskas (LTU)	10
Albert Angelov (BUL)	1

Round of 16
Konrad Cudnik (POL)	0
Onur Yurtada (TUR)	8
Rokas Čepauskas (LTU)	9
Anri Putkaradze (GEO)	0
Levente Lévai (HUN)	4
Vasile Zabica (MDA)	1
Francesco Bellino (ITA)	1
Ognjen Jakovljević (SRB)	3

Quarterfinals
Onur Yurtada (TUR)	5
Rokas Čepauskas (LTU)	9
Levente Lévai (HUN)	9
Ognjen Jakovljević (SRB)	0

Semifinals
Rokas Čepauskas (LTU)	3
Levente Lévai (HUN)	5

Bottom half

Round of 32

Round of 16
Hugo Baff (SWE)	5
Ashot Khachatryan (ARM)	1
Aaron Bellscheidt (GER)	1
Ruslan Nurullayev (AZE)	4
Igor Botez (ROU)	10
Vikke Tarkkio (FIN)	6
Max Hristjuk (EST)	1
Irfan Mirzoiev (UKR)	11

Quarterfinals
Hugo Baff (SWE)	1
Ruslan Nurullayev (AZE)	8
Igor Botez (ROU)	3
Irfan Mirzoiev (UKR)	8

Semifinals
Ruslan Nurullayev (AZE)	3
Irfan Mirzoiev (UKR)	1

Repechage round 2
Vasile Zabica (MDA)	8
Ognjen Jakovljević (SRB)	1
Aaron Bellscheidt (GER)	4
Hugo Baff (SWE)	0

Bronze medal match
Vasile Zabica (MDA)	1
Rokas Čepauskas (LTU)	3
Aaron Bellscheidt (GER)	0
Irfan Mirzoiev (UKR)	9

== Men's Greco-Roman 77 kg ==
26 and 27 June

Legend

- F — Won by fall

Final

Final
Davud Mammadov (AZE)	5
Alexandru Solovei (MDA)	7

Top half

Round of 32
Adam Strandner (SWE)	8
Mateusz Borysewicz-Woźnicki (POL)	0
Vahe Hovhannisyan (ARM)	4
Veeti Kajanne (FIN)	1
Ekke Leitham (EST)	5
Kipras Gvozdas (LTU)	6

Round of 16
Martin Dimitrov (BUL)	10^{F}
Andreas Vasilakopoulos (GRE)	0
Adam Strandner (SWE)	6
Dominik Botos (HUN)	1
Davud Mammadov (AZE)	7
Vahe Hovhannisyan (ARM)	1
Kipras Gvozdas (LTU)	0
Ruslan Abdiiev (UKR)	8

Quarterfinals
Martin Dimitrov (BUL)	4
Adam Strandner (SWE)	2
Davud Mammadov (AZE)	4
Ruslan Abdiiev (UKR)	2

Semifinals
Martin Dimitrov (BUL)	1
Davud Mammadov (AZE)	7

Bottom half

Round of 32
Mihael Lukač (CRO)	3
İlhan Aldı (TUR)	1
Tornike Mikeladze (GEO)	1
Alexandru Solovei (MDA)	3

Round of 16
Michal Zelenka (CZE)	8
Niko Nikoladze (ISR)	0
Mihael Lukač (CRO)	10
Iulian Lungu (ROU)	2
Antal Vamoš (SRB)	0
Alexandru Solovei (MDA)	4
Ibrahim Tabaev (BEL)	2
Iwan Tagner (GER)	5

Quarterfinals
Michal Zelenka (CZE)	4
Mihael Lukač (CRO)	2
Alexandru Solovei (MDA)	4
Iwan Tagner (GER)	1

Semifinals
Michal Zelenka (CZE)	3
Alexandru Solovei (MDA)	7

Repechage round 1
Tornike Mikeladze (GEO)	9
Antal Vamoš (SRB)	0

Repechage round 2
Vahe Hovhannisyan (ARM)	1
Ruslan Abdiiev (UKR)	4
Tornike Mikeladze (GEO)	8
Iwan Tagner (GER)	0

Bronze medal match
Ruslan Abdiiev (UKR)	9
Martin Dimitrov (BUL)	0
Tornike Mikeladze (GEO)	3
Michal Zelenka (CZE)	4

== Men's Greco-Roman 82 kg ==
27 and 28 June

Legend

- F — Won by fall
- WO — Won by walkover

Final

Final
Alperen Berber (TUR)	3
Alexander Johansson (SWE)	6

Top half

Round of 32
~~Ruben Gevorgyan (ARM)~~
Data Chkhaidze (GEO)	WO

Round of 16
Alperen Berber (TUR)	10
Nicolaos Ignătescu (ROU)	1
Data Chkhaidze (GEO)	1
Brandon Guiadem Kamdem (FRA)	1
Miloš Perović (SRB)	5
Kalle Laisarv (EST)	2
Antonio Lukač (CRO)	0
Ismail Rzayev (AZE)	9

Quarterfinals
Alperen Berber (TUR)	3
Data Chkhaidze (GEO)	1
Miloš Perović (SRB)	1
Ismail Rzayev (AZE)	3

Semifinals
Alperen Berber (TUR)	9
Ismail Rzayev (AZE)	0

Bottom half

Round of 32
Jiří Janda (CZE)	0
Alexander Johansson (SWE)	9

Round of 16
Ivan Chmyr (UKR)	9
Mohamed Amin Mainich (ESP)	0
Leon Rivalta (ITA)	7
Ivaylo Ivanov (BUL)	0
Christos Chatsatourov (GRE)	0
Alexander Johansson (SWE)	9
Mihai Guțu (MDA)	8
Piotr Chełek (POL)	0

Quarterfinals
Ivan Chmyr (UKR)	1
Leon Rivalta (ITA)	1
Alexander Johansson (SWE)	6
Mihai Guțu (MDA)	1

Semifinals
Ivan Chmyr (UKR)	3
Alexander Johansson (SWE)	4

Repechage round 1
Jiří Janda (CZE)	0
Christos Chatsatourov (GRE)	10

Repechage round 2
Nicolaos Ignătescu (ROU)	1
Data Chkhaidze (GEO)	3
Christos Chatsatourov (GRE)	0
Mihai Guțu (MDA)	10

Bronze medal match
Data Chkhaidze (GEO)	6
Ismail Rzayev (AZE)	1
Mihai Guțu (MDA)	1
Ivan Chmyr (UKR)	4

== Men's Greco-Roman 87 kg ==
26 and 27 June

Legend

- F — Won by fall

Final

Final
Achiko Bolkvadze (GEO)	5
Vigen Nazaryan (ARM)	4

Top half

Round of 32
Elias Lyyski (FIN)	1
Etibar Rzayev (AZE)	2

Round of 16
Achiko Bolkvadze (GEO)	9
Tomislav Brkan (CRO)	0
Etibar Rzayev (AZE)	2
Patrik Gordan (ROU)	9
Andrija Mihajlović (SRB)	5
Damian Matveiko (LTU)	1
Nikolaos Iosifidis (GRE)	3
Wojciech Iwanowski (POL)	0

Quarterfinals
Achiko Bolkvadze (GEO)	9
Patrik Gordan (ROU)	0
Andrija Mihajlović (SRB)	5
Nikolaos Iosifidis (GRE)	3

Semifinals
Achiko Bolkvadze (GEO)	8
Andrija Mihajlović (SRB)	0

Bottom half

Round of 32

Round of 16
Levente Szokol (HUN)	0
Vigen Nazaryan (ARM)	9
Cristian Rusu (MDA)	7
Andrey Atanasov (BUL)	4
Erdem Kethüda (TUR)	0
Hamza Sertcanli (SWE)	10
Tykhon Shafranskyi (UKR)	5
Robin Uspenski (EST)	3

Quarterfinals
Vigen Nazaryan (ARM)	9
Cristian Rusu (MDA)	0
Hamza Sertcanli (SWE)	5
Tykhon Shafranskyi (UKR)	0

Semifinals
Vigen Nazaryan (ARM)	3
Hamza Sertcanli (SWE)	1

Repechage round 2
Tomislav Brkan (CRO)	1
Patrik Gordan (ROU)	4
Levente Szokol (HUN)	6
Cristian Rusu (MDA)	2

Bronze medal match
Patrik Gordan (ROU)	7
Andrija Mihajlović (SRB)	3
Levente Szokol (HUN)	0
Hamza Sertcanli (SWE)	5

== Men's Greco-Roman 97 kg ==
27 and 28 June

Legend

- F — Won by fall

Main bracket

Round of 16
Gor Ayvazyan (GEO)	9
Hunor Kudelász (HUN)	0
Isa Huseynov (AZE)	1
Kaloyan Ivanov (BUL)	5
Darius Kiefer (GER)	1
Kevin Uspenski (EST)	1
Vladyslav Lub (UKR)	0
Rostislav Covali (MDA)	4
Simonas Viliulis (LTU)	2
Nurettin Koç (TUR)	8^{F}

Quarterfinals
Sebastian Warchoł (POL)	1
Gor Ayvazyan (GEO)	3
Kaloyan Ivanov (BUL)	1
Darius Kiefer (GER)	4
Arshak Geghamyan (ARM)	7
Rostislav Covali (MDA)	13
Nurettin Koç (TUR)	8
Ionuț Manolache (ROU)	2

Semifinals
Gor Ayvazyan (GEO)	3
Darius Kiefer (GER)	2
Rostislav Covali (MDA)	5
Nurettin Koç (TUR)	1

Final
Gor Ayvazyan (GEO)	6
Rostislav Covali (MDA)	1

Repechage round
Hunor Kudelász (HUN)	1
Sebastian Warchoł (POL)	9
Vladyslav Lub (UKR)	7
Arshak Geghamyan (ARM)	1

Bronze medals
Sebastian Warchoł (POL)	3
Darius Kiefer (GER)	10
Vladyslav Lub (UKR)	3
Nurettin Koç (TUR)	3

== Men's Greco-Roman 130 kg ==
26 and 27 June

Legend

- F — Won by fall

Main bracket

Round of 16
Leonhard Junger (AUT)	1
Maksim Petrov (BUL)	2
László Darabos (HUN)	9
Maik Haimov (ISR)	0
Talip Çiftçi (TUR)	9
Aramayis Harutyunyan (ARM)	0

Quarterfinals
Eerik Pank (EST)	9
Maksim Petrov (BUL)	0
Achilleas Chrysidis (GRE)	1
Mazaim Mardanov (AZE)	1
Vladyslav Chertoryinskyi (UKR)	1
László Darabos (HUN)	9
Talip Çiftçi (TUR)	9
Rati Talikishvili (GEO)	0

Semifinals
Eerik Pank (EST)	7
Mazaim Mardanov (AZE)	8
László Darabos (HUN)	7
Talip Çiftçi (TUR)	2

Final
Mazaim Mardanov (AZE)	0
László Darabos (HUN)	9

Repechage round
Maik Haimov (ISR)	2
Vladyslav Chertoryinskyi (UKR)	11

Bronze medals
Achilleas Chrysidis (GRE)	3
Eerik Pank (EST)	4
Vladyslav Chertoryinskyi (UKR)	0
Talip Çiftçi (TUR)	8

== See also ==
- 2023 European Juniors Wrestling Championships – Men's freestyle
- 2023 European Juniors Wrestling Championships – Women's freestyle
