= 2023 European Juniors Wrestling Championships – Women's freestyle =

The Women's Freestyle competitions at the 2023 European Juniors Wrestling Championships were held in Santiago de Compostela, Spain between 28 and 30 June 2023.

== Women's freestyle 50 kg ==
28 and 29 June

Legend

- F — Won by fall

Main bracket

Round of 16
Svenja Jungo (SUI) | 10
Michelle Schnapp (GER) | 0
Bianka Fáth (HUN) | 6
Emine Osman (BUL) | 5
Zerda Demir (TUR) | 7
Asmar Jankurtaran (AZE) | 6
Julia Michniewicz (POL) | 3
Vestina Danisevičiūtė (LTU) | 6
Georgiana Antuca (ROU) | 4
Réka Hegedüs (SVK) | 0
María Cazalla (ESP) | 0
Viktoriia Slobodeniuk (UKR) | 10

Quarterfinals
Karolína Müllerová (CZE) | 0
Svenja Jungo (SUI) | 4^{F}
Bianka Fáth (HUN) | 0
Zerda Demir (TUR) | 10
Vestina Danisevičiūtė (LTU) | 0
Georgiana Antuca (ROU) | 8
Viktoriia Slobodeniuk (UKR) | 8^{F}
Marija Spirkovska (MKD) | 0

Semifinals
Svenja Jungo (SUI) | 7
Zerda Demir (TUR) | 11
Georgiana Antuca (ROU) | 0
Viktoriia Slobodeniuk (UKR) | 6^{F}

Final
Zerda Demir (TUR) | 5
Viktoriia Slobodeniuk (UKR) | 6

Repechage round
Asmar Jankurtaran (AZE) | 15
Bianka Fáth (HUN) | 5
María Cazalla (ESP) | 6^{F}
Marija Spirkovska (MKD) | 0

Bronze medals
Asmar Jankurtaran (AZE) | 9
Svenja Jungo (SUI) | 6
María Cazalla (ESP) | 1
Georgiana Antuca (ROU) | 4

== Women's freestyle 53 kg ==
29 and 30 June

Legend

- F — Won by fall

Main bracket

Round of 16
Eliška Toropová (CZE) | 0
Emine Çakmak (TUR) | 10
Khrystyna Basych (SVK) | 10
Elena Placenti (ITA) | 0
Laurie Lesaffre (FRA) | 4
Gultakin Shirinova (AZE) | 14
Nikola Wiśniewska (POL) | 2
Anna Tieliegina (LTU) | 5^{F}
Vivien Matyi (HUN) | 0
Mariia Yefremova (UKR) | 10
Amory Andrich (GER) | 2
Mihaela Samoil (MDA) | 2
Patricia Iuraşcu (ROU) | 0
Carla Jaume (ESP) | 7

Quarterfinals
Nikol Krumova (BUL) | 2
Emine Çakmak (TUR) | 6
Khrystyna Basych (SVK) | 6
Gultakin Shirinova (AZE) | 14
Anna Tieliegina (LTU) | 0
Mariia Yefremova (UKR) | 10
Amory Andrich (GER) | 9
Carla Jaume (ESP) | 1

Semifinals
Emine Çakmak (TUR) | 1
Gultakin Shirinova (AZE) | 4
Mariia Yefremova (UKR) | 11
Amory Andrich (GER) | 0

Final
Gultakin Shirinova (AZE) | 0
Mariia Yefremova (UKR) | 2

Repechage round
Laurie Lesaffre (FRA) | 0
Khrystyna Basych (SVK) | 6
Vivien Matyi (HUN) | 8
Anna Tieliegina (LTU) | 14

Bronze medals
Khrystyna Basych (SVK) | 14
Emine Çakmak (TUR) | 3
Anna Tieliegina (LTU) | 3
Amory Andrich (GER) | 13

== Women's freestyle 55 kg ==
28 and 29 June

Legend

- F — Won by fall

Main bracket

Round of 16
Tuba Demir (TUR) | 10
Julia Nowicka (POL) | 0
Emel Mustafova (BUL) | 0
Milica Sekulović (SRB) | 2^{F}
Immacolata Danise (ITA) | 10
Sofiia Marchenko (UKR) | 0
Ruzanna Mammadova (AZE) | 6^{F}
Lina Niţă (MDA) | 0
Evdoxia Papadopoulou (GRE) | 2
Rebekka March (GER) | 4^{F}

Quarterfinals
Róza Szenttamási (HUN) | 0
Tuba Demir (TUR) | 2^{F}
Milica Sekulović (SRB) | 0
Immacolata Danise (ITA) | 11
Georgiana Lircă (ROU) | 5
Ruzanna Mammadova (AZE) | 4
Rebekka March (GER) | 3
Felicitas Domajeva (NOR) | 4

Semifinals
Tuba Demir (TUR) | 12
Immacolata Danise (ITA) | 2
Georgiana Lircă (ROU) | 8
Felicitas Domajeva (NOR) | 6

Final
Tuba Demir (TUR) | 10
Georgiana Lircă (ROU) | 0

Repechage round
Julia Nowicka (POL) | 4
Róza Szenttamási (HUN) | 8

Bronze medals
Róza Szenttamási (HUN) | 8
Immacolata Danise (ITA) | 8
Ruzanna Mammadova (AZE) | 9
Felicitas Domajeva (NOR) | 4

== Women's freestyle 57 kg ==
29 and 30 June

Legend

- F — Won by fall

Main bracket

Round of 16
Nesrin Syuleymanova (BUL) | 0
Nargiz Samadova (AZE) | 3
Tindra Dalmyr (SWE) | 0
Alina Filipovych (UKR) | 10^{F}
Şevval Çayır (TUR) | 8^{F}
Elena Torres (ESP) | 0
Petra Mráčková (CZE) | 2
Patrycja Strzelczyk (POL) | 10
Gerda Terék (HUN) | 4^{F}
Céleste Sion (FRA) | 0
Elena Gassner (AUT) | 0
Lotta Vettenranta (FIN) | 10
Naemi Leistner (GER) | 5
Jana Petrović (SRB) | 4

Quarterfinals
Lana Nogić (CRO) | 1
Nargiz Samadova (AZE) | 11
Alina Filipovych (UKR) | 11
Şevval Çayır (TUR) | 0
Patrycja Strzelczyk (POL) | 1
Gerda Terék (HUN) | 3
Lotta Vettenranta (FIN) | 3^{F}
Naemi Leistner (GER) | 2

Semifinals
Nargiz Samadova (AZE) | 0
Alina Filipovych (UKR) | 11
Gerda Terék (HUN) | 6^{F}
Lotta Vettenranta (FIN) | 4

Final
Alina Filipovych (UKR) | 10
Gerda Terék (HUN) | 1

Repechage round
Tindra Dalmyr (SWE) | 0
Şevval Çayır (TUR) | 4^{F}
Céleste Sion (FRA) | 1
Patrycja Strzelczyk (POL) | 3

Bronze medals
Şevval Çayır (TUR) | 10
Nargiz Samadova (AZE) | 0
Patrycja Strzelczyk (POL) | 1
Lotta Vettenranta (FIN) | 1

== Women's freestyle 59 kg ==
28 and 29 June

Legend

- F — Won by fall

Main bracket

Round of 16
Jovana Radivojević (SRB) | 0
Annatina Lippuner (SUI) | 10
Tereza Mračková (CZE) | 0
Sevim Akbaş (TUR) | 10
Firuza Majidova (AZE) | 2
Aleksandra Witos (POL) | 9^{F}
Yuliia Pakhniuk (UKR) | 8
Viktória Borsos (HUN) | 2

Quarterfinals
Gabrielė Dilytė (LTU) | 0
Annatina Lippuner (SUI) | 10
Sevim Akbaş (TUR) | 6
Mia Olivier (FRA) | 4
Fatme Shaban (BUL) | 6^{F}
Aleksandra Witos (POL) | 0
Yuliia Pakhniuk (UKR) | 5
Aurora Russo (ITA) | 7

Semifinals
Annatina Lippuner (SUI) | 12
Sevim Akbaş (TUR) | 1
Fatme Shaban (BUL) | 0
Aurora Russo (ITA) | 5

Final
Annatina Lippuner (SUI) | 3
Aurora Russo (ITA) | 14

Repechage round
Jovana Radivojević (SRB) | 2^{F}
Gabrielė Dilytė (LTU) | 4

Bronze medals
Jovana Radivojević (SRB) | 0
Sevim Akbaş (TUR) | 10
Yuliia Pakhniuk (UKR) | 14^{F}
Fatme Shaban (BUL) | 4

== Women's freestyle 62 kg ==
29 and 30 June

Legend

- F — Won by fall

Main bracket

Round of 16
Ana-Maria Crețu (MDA) | 7
Ugnė Laurinskytė (LTU) | 0
Iryna Bondar (UKR) | 12
Hedda Förare Berg (SWE) | 1
Nika Slavica Anđelić (CRO) | 0
Yasmine Soliman (HUN) | 10

Quarterfinals
Selvi İlyasoğlu (TUR) | 9
Ana-Maria Crețu (MDA) | 6
Iris Thiébaux (FRA) | 3
Luisa Scheel (GER) | 1
Mima Taneva (BUL) | 0
Iryna Bondar (UKR) | 11
Yasmine Soliman (HUN) | 4
Olha Padoshyk (POL) | 2^{F}

Semifinals
Selvi İlyasoğlu (TUR) | 0
Iris Thiébaux (FRA) | 10
Iryna Bondar (UKR) | 6
Olha Padoshyk (POL) | 6

Final
Iris Thiébaux (FRA) | 0
Iryna Bondar (UKR) | 4^{F}

Repechage round
Hedda Förare Berg (SWE) | 7
Mima Taneva (BUL) | 0

Bronze medals
Luisa Scheel (GER) | 2
Selvi İlyasoğlu (TUR) | 12
Hedda Förare Berg (SWE) | 7
Olha Padoshyk (POL) | 4

== Women's freestyle 65 kg ==
29 and 30 June

Legend

- F — Won by fall

Main bracket

Round of 16
Alicja Nowosad (POL) | 8^{F}
Büşra Efe (TUR) | 5
Reka van Os (NED) | 0
Yelyzaveta Vynohrad (UKR) | 10^{F}
Fatima Isayeva (AZE) | 0
Enikő Elekes (HUN) | 4^{F}

Quarterfinals
Maria Panțîru (ROU) | 5
Alicja Nowosad (POL) | 7
Viktoria Øverby (NOR) | 1
Gerda Barth (GER) | 7
Gergana Stoyanova (BUL) | 3
Yelyzaveta Vynohrad (UKR) | 3
Enikő Elekes (HUN) | 9
Maša Perović (SRB) | 1

Semifinals
Alicja Nowosad (POL) | 7
Gerda Barth (GER) | 2
Yelyzaveta Vynohrad (UKR) | 2
Enikő Elekes (HUN) | 15

Final
Alicja Nowosad (POL) | 1
Enikő Elekes (HUN) | 5

Repechage round
Büşra Efe (TUR) | 8
Maria Panțîru (ROU) | 12^{F}
Fatima Isayeva (AZE) | 10
Maša Perović (SRB) | 18^{F}

Bronze medals
Maria Panțîru (ROU) | 5
Gerda Barth (GER) | 3
Maša Perović (SRB) | 6^{F}
Yelyzaveta Vynohrad (UKR) | 2

== Women's freestyle 68 kg ==
28 and 29 June

Legend

- F — Won by fall

Main bracket

Round of 16
Marziya Sadigova (AZE) | 2^{F}
Emilija Jakovljević (SRB) | 4
Iveta Česnauskaitė (LTU) | 0
Manola Skobelska (UKR) | 8^{F}
Viorica Adam (ROU) | 11
Bojana Lazarevska (MKD) | 0
Daniela Brasnarova (BUL) | 8
Karolina Jaworska (POL) | 3
Ayşe Erkan (TUR) | 13
Luciana Beda (MDA) | 15

Quarterfinals
Nikoleta Barmpa (GRE) | 8
Marziya Sadigova (AZE) | 6
Manola Skobelska (UKR) | 11
Viorica Adam (ROU) | 0
Sophia Schäfle (GER) | 3
Daniela Brasnarova (BUL) | 1
Luciana Beda (MDA) | 8
Karolina Pók (HUN) | 2

Semifinals
Nikoleta Barmpa (GRE) | 0
Manola Skobelska (UKR) | 10
Sophia Schäfle (GER) | 8^{F}
Luciana Beda (MDA) | 0

Final
Manola Skobelska (UKR) | 13
Sophia Schäfle (GER) | 0

Repechage round
Iveta Česnauskaitė (LTU) | 0
Viorica Adam (ROU) | 6

Bronze medals
Viorica Adam (ROU) | 0
Nikoleta Barmpa (GRE) | 10
Daniela Brasnarova (BUL) | 0
Luciana Beda (MDA) | 7

== Women's freestyle 72 kg ==
29 and 30 June

Legend

- F — Won by fall
- WO — Won by walkover

Main bracket

Round of 16
Elmira Yasin (TUR) | 0
Noémi Osváth-Nagy (HUN) | 10
Yasmín Alonso (ESP) | 0
Vanesa Georgieva (BUL) | 10

Quarterfinals
Iryna Zablotska (UKR) | 4
Noémi Osváth-Nagy (HUN) | 2
Julia Lötscher (SUI) | WO
~~Emilia Creciun (MDA)~~
Milla Anđelić (CRO) | 12
Ambre Chevreau (FRA) | 11
Vanesa Georgieva (BUL) | 4
Patrycja Cuber (POL) | 5

Semifinals
Iryna Zablotska (UKR) | 5^{F}
Julia Lötscher (SUI) | 4
Milla Anđelić (CRO) | 0
Patrycja Cuber (POL) | 6^{F}

Final
Iryna Zablotska (UKR) | 2
Patrycja Cuber (POL) | 1

Bronze medals
Noémi Osváth-Nagy (HUN) | 4^{F}
Julia Lötscher (SUI) | 0
Vanesa Georgieva (BUL) | 8
Milla Anđelić (CRO) | 4

== Women's freestyle 76 kg ==
28 and 29 June

Legend

- F — Won by fall

Main bracket

Round of 16
Eleni Chrysikaki (GRE) | 0
Veronika Nyikos (HUN) | 4^{F}

Quarterfinals
Mariia Zenkina (UKR) | 1
Veronika Nyikos (HUN) | 7
Nazar Batır (TUR) | 8
Marta Besek (CRO) | 1
Daniela Tkachuk (POL) | 2
Laura Kühn (GER) | 4^{F}
Elena Reinholtsen (NOR) | 4
Elvira Braun (SWE) | 7^{F}

Semifinals
Veronika Nyikos (HUN) | 8
Nazar Batır (TUR) | 3
Laura Kühn (GER) | 6^{F}
Elvira Braun (SWE) | 1

Final
Veronika Nyikos (HUN) | 6
Laura Kühn (GER) | 4

Repechage round
Eleni Chrysikaki (GRE) | 0
Mariia Zenkina (UKR) | 4^{F}

Bronze medal match
Mariia Zenkina (UKR) | 3^{F}
Nazar Batır (TUR) | 2
Daniela Tkachuk (POL) | 4^{F}
Elvira Braun (SWE) | 2

== See also ==
- 2023 European Juniors Wrestling Championships – Men's freestyle
- 2023 European Juniors Wrestling Championships – Men's Greco-Roman
