= 2022 European U17 Wrestling Championships =

2022 European Cadets Wrestling Championships
- Host city: Bucharest, Romania
- Dates: 13–19 June 2022
- Stadium: Polyvalent Hall

Champions
- Freestyle: Azerbaijan
- Greco-Roman: Azerbaijan
- Women: Ukraine

The 2022 European Cadets Wrestling Championships (U17) is the 24th edition of European Cadets Wrestling Championship of combined events, and takes place from June 13 to 19 in Bucharest, Romania.

== Competition schedule ==
All times are (UTC+3)

Date	Time	Event
13 June	11.30-15.00	Qualification rounds GR – 48-55-65-80-110 kg
13 June	18:00-19.30	Semi-finals: GR – 48-55-65-80-110 kg
14 June	11.30-14.30	Qualification rounds GR – 45-51-60-71-92 kg; Repechage GR – 48-55-65-80-110 kg
14 June	17.00-17.45	Semi-finals: GR – 45-51-60-71-92 kg
14 June	18.00-20.00	Finals GR – 48-55-65-80-110 kg
15 June	11.30-14.00	Qualification rounds WW – 43-49-57-65-73 kg; Repechage GR – 45-51-60-71-92 kg
15 June	17.00-17.45	Semi-finals: WW – 43-49-57-65-73 kg
15 June	18.00-20.00	Finals GR – 45-51-60-71-92 kg
16 June	11.30-14.00	Qualification rounds WW – 40-46-53-61-69 kg; Repechage WW – 43-49-57-65-73 kg
16 June	17.00-17.45	Semi-finals: WW – 40-46-53-61-69 kg
16 June	18.00-20.00	Finals WW – 43-49-57-65-73 kg
17 June	11.30-14.00	Qualification rounds FS – 48-55-65-80-110 kg; Repechage WW – 40-46-53-61-69 kg
17 June	17.00-17.45	Semi-finals: FS – 48-55-65-80-110 kg
17 June	18.00-20.00	Finals WW – 40-46-53-61-69 kg
18 June	11.30-14.00	Qualification rounds FS – 45-51-60-71-92 kg; Repechage FS – 48-55-65-80-110 kg
18 June	16.45-17.45	Semi-finals: FS – 45-51-60-71-92 kg
18 June	18.00-21.00	Finals FS – 48-55-65-80-110 kg
19 June	16.30-17.45	Repechage: FS – 45-51-60-71-92 kg
19 June	18.00-20.00	Finals: FS – 45-51-60-71-92 kg
19 June	21.00	Final banquet

== Medal table ==
* Host nation (Romania)

Rank	Nation	Gold	Silver	Bronze	Total
1	Azerbaijan	9	7	4	20
2	Ukraine	5	1	12	18
3	Turkey	4	7	4	15
4	Hungary	2	4	2	8
5	Georgia	2	3	5	10
6	Romania*	2	1	1	4
7	Moldova	2	0	3	5
8	France	1	1	3	5
9	Bulgaria	1	1	1	3
10	Poland	1	1	0	2
11	Greece	1	0	2	3
12	Armenia	0	2	8	10
13	Italy	0	2	0	2
14	Germany	0	0	7	7
15	Croatia	0	0	2	2
16	Lithuania	0	0	1	1
16	Netherlands	0	0	1	1
16	Norway	0	0	1	1
16	Serbia	0	0	1	1
Totals (19 entries)		30	30	58	118

== Team ranking ==
Rank	Men's freestyle		Men's Greco-Roman		Women's freestyle	
Rank	Team	Points	Team	Points	Team	Points
1	Azerbaijan	210	Azerbaijan	175	Ukraine	180
2	Turkey	136	Georgia	109	Turkey	159
3	Georgia	118	Ukraine	109	Romania	106
4	Ukraine	108	Turkey	102	Germany	72
5	Armenia	94	Armenia	100	Azerbaijan	66
6	Moldova	83	Hungary	95	Poland	61
7	Germany	66	Romania	67	France	57
8	Hungary	60	Moldova	56	Hungary	53
9	Bulgaria	57	Greece	50	Italy	46
10	France	47	Bulgaria	45	Norway	41

== Medal overview ==
=== Men's freestyle ===
Event	Gold	Silver	Bronze
45 kg	Sadig Huseynov; Azerbaijan	Nikoloz Botchorishvili; Georgia	Constantin Rusu; Moldova
45 kg	Sadig Huseynov; Azerbaijan	Nikoloz Botchorishvili; Georgia	Arman Harutyunyan; Armenia
48 kg	Vasif Baghirov; Azerbaijan	Rassoul Galbouraev; France	Sasha Petrosyan; Armenia
48 kg	Vasif Baghirov; Azerbaijan	Rassoul Galbouraev; France	Rostislav Kuryliak; Ukraine
51 kg	Elman Aghayev; Azerbaijan	Narek Hakobyan; Armenia	Volodymyr Kornilov; Ukraine
51 kg	Elman Aghayev; Azerbaijan	Narek Hakobyan; Armenia	Mustafa Karabuga; Turkey
55 kg	Jamal Abbasov; Azerbaijan	Illia Shketyk; Ukraine	Artavazd Harutyunyan; Armenia
55 kg	Jamal Abbasov; Azerbaijan	Illia Shketyk; Ukraine	Saba Gambashidze; Georgia
60 kg	Abdullah Toprak; Turkey	Agha Gasimov; Azerbaijan	Bohdan Oleksiienko; Ukraine
60 kg	Abdullah Toprak; Turkey	Agha Gasimov; Azerbaijan	Manuel Wagin; Germany
65 kg	Ilyas Isayev; Azerbaijan	Goga Otinashvili; Georgia	Fatih Acar; Turkey
65 kg	Ilyas Isayev; Azerbaijan	Goga Otinashvili; Georgia	Narek Nikoghosyan; Armenia
71 kg	Kaloyan Atanasov; Bulgaria	Raul Caso; Italy	Nikoloz Maisuradze; Georgia
71 kg	Kaloyan Atanasov; Bulgaria	Raul Caso; Italy	Aghanazar Novruzov; Azerbaijan
80 kg	Alexandru Bors; Moldova	Péter Zsivnovszky; Hungary	Sandro Kurashvili; Georgia
80 kg	Alexandru Bors; Moldova	Péter Zsivnovszky; Hungary	Shamistan Akhundov; Azerbaijan
92 kg	İbrahim Benekli; Turkey	Musza Arsunkaev; Hungary	Nika Pantsulaia; Georgia
92 kg	İbrahim Benekli; Turkey	Musza Arsunkaev; Hungary	Yaroslav Lisniak; Ukraine
110 kg	Yusif Dursunov; Azerbaijan	Taha Yakup Temel; Turkey	Mikael Golling; Germany
110 kg	Yusif Dursunov; Azerbaijan	Taha Yakup Temel; Turkey	Levan Lagvilava; France

=== Greco-Roman ===
Event	Gold	Silver	Bronze
45 kg	Yevhen Pokovba; Ukraine	Mózes Ádám László; Hungary	Samvel Khachatryan; Armenia
45 kg	Yevhen Pokovba; Ukraine	Mózes Ádám László; Hungary	Hüseyn Savadov; Azerbaijan
48 kg	Vakhtang Lolua; Georgia	Elvin Ibadov; Azerbaijan	Nikita Dementiev; Ukraine
48 kg	Vakhtang Lolua; Georgia	Elvin Ibadov; Azerbaijan	Levente Fige; Hungary
51 kg	Anri Khozrevanidze; Georgia	Vadat Gasimli; Azerbaijan	Aleks Margaryan; Armenia
51 kg	Anri Khozrevanidze; Georgia	Vadat Gasimli; Azerbaijan	Maxim Sarmanov; Moldova
55 kg	Faraim Mustafayev; Azerbaijan	Hayk Lyudvigyan; Armenia	Saba Surmanidze; Georgia
55 kg	Faraim Mustafayev; Azerbaijan	Hayk Lyudvigyan; Armenia	Halil Çınar; Turkey
60 kg	Mahammad Gasimzade; Azerbaijan	Avtandil Mamaladze; Georgia	Eimantas Andriuška; Lithuania
60 kg	Mahammad Gasimzade; Azerbaijan	Avtandil Mamaladze; Georgia	Gaspar Terteryan; Armenia
65 kg	Arionas Kolitsopoulos; Greece	Seymur Gasimov; Azerbaijan	Vahe Hovhannisyan; Armenia
65 kg	Arionas Kolitsopoulos; Greece	Seymur Gasimov; Azerbaijan	Levente Levai; Hungary
71 kg	İbrahim Özdemir; Turkey	Davud Mammadov; Azerbaijan	Maksym Radyk; Ukraine
71 kg	İbrahim Özdemir; Turkey	Davud Mammadov; Azerbaijan	Dimitar Rachev; Bulgaria
80 kg	Mihai Gutu; Moldova	Ismayil Rzayev; Azerbaijan	Yegor Yakushenko; Ukraine
80 kg	Mihai Gutu; Moldova	Ismayil Rzayev; Azerbaijan	Branko Dukić; Serbia
92 kg	Gabriel Eduardo Stan; Romania	Sebastian Warchol; Poland	Roko Strika; Croatia
92 kg	Gabriel Eduardo Stan; Romania	Sebastian Warchol; Poland	Darius Kiefer; Germany
110 kg	Laszlo Darabos; Hungary	Cemal Yusuf Bakır; Turkey	Dimitris Thanos; Greece
110 kg	Laszlo Darabos; Hungary	Cemal Yusuf Bakır; Turkey	Dmytro Stryzhekozin; Ukraine

=== Women's freestyle ===
Event	Gold	Silver	Bronze
40 kg	Yevheniia Druzenko; Ukraine	Yağmur Karabacak; Turkey	Bianca Iancau; Romania
43 kg	Anastasiia Polska; Ukraine	Elvina Karimzada; Azerbaijan	Josephine Wrensch; Germany
46 kg	Kornélia László; Hungary	Alexandra Voiculescu; Romania	Juliette Lescure; France
46 kg	Kornélia László; Hungary	Alexandra Voiculescu; Romania	Aysel Mammadzada; Azerbaijan
49 kg	Ruzanna Mammadova; Azerbaijan	Fabiana Rinella; Italy	Şevval Çayır; Turkey
49 kg	Ruzanna Mammadova; Azerbaijan	Fabiana Rinella; Italy	Anastasiia Zadvorna; Ukraine
53 kg	Mariia Yefremova; Ukraine	Sevim Akbaş; Turkey	Lina Nita; Moldova
53 kg	Mariia Yefremova; Ukraine	Sevim Akbaş; Turkey	Lilya Yasmina Cohen; France
57 kg	Tuba Demir; Turkey	Gerda Terék; Hungary	Alina Filipovych; Ukraine
57 kg	Tuba Demir; Turkey	Gerda Terék; Hungary	Naemi Leistner; Germany
61 kg	Sabina Petrache; Romania	İlayda Cin; Turkey	Leonie Steigert; Germany
61 kg	Sabina Petrache; Romania	İlayda Cin; Turkey	Leah Melina Samsonsen; Norway
65 kg	Nicola Wasilewska; Poland	Duygu Gen; Turkey	Reka Julia Van Os; Netherlands
65 kg	Nicola Wasilewska; Poland	Duygu Gen; Turkey	Daria Konstantinova; Ukraine
69 kg	Nadiia Sokolovska; Ukraine	Ayşe Erkan; Turkey	Nikoleta Barmpa; Greece
69 kg	Nadiia Sokolovska; Ukraine	Ayşe Erkan; Turkey	Veronika Vilk; Croatia
73 kg	Ambre Chevreau; France	Gabriela Maeva; Bulgaria	Mariia Zenkina; Ukraine
73 kg	Ambre Chevreau; France	Gabriela Maeva; Bulgaria	Lotta Englich; Germany

== Participating nations ==
451 wrestlers from 33 countries:

1. Albania (1)
2. Armenia (19)
3. Austria (8)
4. Azerbaijan (26)
5. Bulgaria (29)
6. Croatia (9)
7. Czech Republic (8)
8. Spain (7)
9. Estonia (10)
10. Finland (5)
11. France (13)
12. Georgia (21)
13. Germany (24)
14. Greece (16)
15. Hungary (26)
16. Israel (3)
17. Italy (15)
18. Kosovo (2)
19. Latvia (6)
20. Lithuania (14)
21. Moldova (20)
22. North Macedonia (8)
23. Netherlands (2)
24. Norway (9)
25. Poland (25)
26. Romania (30)
27. Slovenia (1)
28. Serbia (9)
29. Switzerland (6)
30. Slovakia (9)
31. Sweden (9)
32. Turkey (30)
33. Ukraine (30)
- Russia and Belarus banned from attending all international competitions due to the 2022 Russian invasion of Ukraine.
