= 2023 European Juniors Wrestling Championships – Men's freestyle =

The Men's Freestyle competitions at the 2023 European Juniors Wrestling Championships were held in Santiago de Compostela, Spain between 30 June and 2 July 2023.

== Men's freestyle 57 kg ==
30 June and 1 July

Legend

- F — Won by fall

Main bracket

Round of 16
Tanyo Tanev (BUL) | 0
Ruslan Abdullayev (AZE) | 10
Tolga Özbek (TUR) | 12
Harutyun Hovhannisyan (ARM) | 2
Jules Gardette (FRA) | 2
Vladyslav Yatskovskyi (UKR) | 6
Alessandro Iemma (ESP) | 2
David Kiefer (GER) | 13
Dimitrios Oflidis (GRE) | 6^{F}
Harvey Ridings (GBR) | 2
Balázs Rácz (HUN) | 9
Rafał Szewc (POL) | 11

Quarterfinals
Luka Gvinjilia (GEO) | 2
Ruslan Abdullayev (AZE) | 13
Tolga Özbek (TUR) | 7^{F}
Vladyslav Yatskovskyi (UKR) | 2
David Kiefer (GER) | 9
Dimitrios Oflidis (GRE) | 4
Rafał Szewc (POL) | 2
Anton Vlas (MDA) | 14

Semifinals
Ruslan Abdullayev (AZE) | 6
Tolga Özbek (TUR) | 5
David Kiefer (GER) | 0
Anton Vlas (MDA) | 10

Final
Ruslan Abdullayev (AZE) | 10
Anton Vlas (MDA) | 0

Repechage round
Tanyo Tanev (BUL) | 0
Luka Gvinjilia (GEO) | 12

Bronze medals
Luka Gvinjilia (GEO) | 0
Tolga Özbek (TUR) | 10
Rafał Szewc (POL) | 10
David Kiefer (GER) | 10^{F}

== Men's freestyle 61 kg ==
1 and 2 July

Legend

- F — Won by fall

Main bracket

Round of 16
Benjamin Boejthe (ROU) | 16
Besir Alili (MKD) | 15
Janar Lips (EST) | 0
Emre Çetin (TUR) | 2
Róbert Meszároš (SVK) | 10
Antonino Militano (ITA) | 0
Dario Dittrich (GER) | 1
Levik Mikayelyan (ARM) | 12
Mykola Tashohlo (UKR) | 9
Tornike Asabashvili (GEO) | 7
Marc Arias (ESP) | 8
Oskar Kulczycki (POL) | 3
Vasile Marcu (MDA) | 2
Denis Naim (BUL) | 2
Zoltán Mizsei (HUN) | 1
Jeyhun Allahverdiyev (AZE) | 11

Quarterfinals
Benjamin Boejthe (ROU) | 9^{F}
Emre Çetin (TUR) | 2
Róbert Meszároš (SVK) | 0
Levik Mikayelyan (ARM) | 11
Mykola Tashohlo (UKR) | 0
Marc Arias (ESP) | 5^{F}
Denis Naim (BUL) | 0
Jeyhun Allahverdiyev (AZE) | 10

Semifinals
Benjamin Boejthe (ROU) | 9
Levik Mikayelyan (ARM) | 19
Marc Arias (ESP) | 0
Jeyhun Allahverdiyev (AZE) | 11

Final
Levik Mikayelyan (ARM) | 0
Jeyhun Allahverdiyev (AZE) | 2

Repechage round
Dario Dittrich (GER) | 12
Róbert Meszároš (SVK) | 2
Zoltán Mizsei (HUN) | 9
Denis Naim (BUL) | 5

Bronze medals
Dario Dittrich (GER) | 2
Benjamin Boejthe (ROU) | 11
Zoltán Mizsei (HUN) | 8
Marc Arias (ESP) | 3

== Men's freestyle 65 kg ==
30 June and 1 July

Legend

- F — Won by fall

Final

| Final |
| Mykyta Zubal (UKR) | 16 |
| Goga Otinashvili (GEO) | 6 |

Top half

Round of 32
Mykyta Zubal (UKR) | 10
Akseli Erkkola (FIN) | 0

Round of 16
Ferenc Dániel Kovács (SVK) | 0
Felipe Ferrusola (ESP) | 10
Mykyta Zubal (UKR) | 10
Bozhidar Dzhorov (BUL) | 0
Seyfulla Itaev (FRA) | 3
Abdullah Toprak (TUR) | 3
Marcel Wagin (GER) | 8
Bartosz Sołtys (POL) | 11

Quarterfinals
Felipe Ferrusola (ESP) | 0
Mykyta Zubal (UKR) | 10
Seyfulla Itaev (FRA) | 10
Bartosz Sołtys (POL) | 0

Semifinals
Mykyta Zubal (UKR) | 5
Seyfulla Itaev (FRA) | 4

Bottom half

Round of 32
Ronen Kolesnik (ISR) | 8
Islam Magomaev (BEL) | 7

Round of 16
Marian Sandu (ROU) | 0
Goga Otinashvili (GEO) | 10
Paolo Lumia (ITA) | 9
Luca Hartmann (AUT) | 2
Andranik Avetisyan (ARM) | 10
Ronen Kolesnik (ISR) | 0
Ramik Heybatov (AZE) | 8
Constantin Chirilov (MDA) | 0

Quarterfinals
Goga Otinashvili (GEO) | 11^{F}
Paolo Lumia (ITA) | 4
Andranik Avetisyan (ARM) | 10
Ramik Heybatov (AZE) | 4

Semifinals
Goga Otinashvili (GEO) | 11
Andranik Avetisyan (ARM) | 0

Repechage round 1
Akseli Erkkola (FIN) | 15
Bozhidar Dzhorov (BUL) | 4

Repechage round 2
Akseli Erkkola (FIN) | 6
Felipe Ferrusola (ESP) | 17
Marian Sandu (ROU) | 6
Paolo Lumia (ITA) | 3

Bronze medal match
Felipe Ferrusola (ESP) | 4
Seyfulla Itaev (FRA) | 9
Marian Sandu (ROU) | 0
Andranik Avetisyan (ARM) | 10

== Men's freestyle 70 kg ==
30 June and 1 July

Legend

- F — Won by fall

Main bracket

Round of 16
Javidan Ahmadov (AZE) | 13
Davit Margaryan (ARM) | 7
Zelimkhan Mutsukhaev (POL) | 11
Marko Andonov (MKD) | 0
Ivan Stoyanov (BUL) | 1
Metehan Yaprak (TUR) | 11
Marcell Nagy (HUN) | 8
Muhamed Bektemirov (AUT) | 9
Oleksii Kharchuk (UKR) | 14
Daniel Korkin (ISR) | 4
Burak Emin Salviz (GER) | 4
Kaan Kadovluev (BEL) | 0
Saba Kobakhidze (GEO) | 12
Micah Naisbet (GBR) | 1
Ion Marcu (MDA) | 8
Georgios Ioakeimidis (GRE) | 6

Quarterfinals
Javidan Ahmadov (AZE) | 10
Zelimkhan Mutsukhaev (POL) | 0
Metehan Yaprak (TUR) | 13
Muhamed Bektemirov (AUT) | 6
Oleksii Kharchuk (UKR) | 2
Burak Emin Salviz (GER) | 8^{F}
Saba Kobakhidze (GEO) | 7
Ion Marcu (MDA) | 1

Semifinals
Javidan Ahmadov (AZE) | 8
'Metehan Yaprak (TUR) | 8'
Burak Emin Salviz (GER) | 5
Saba Kobakhidze (GEO) | 15

Final
Metehan Yaprak (TUR) | 10
Saba Kobakhidze (GEO) | 0

Repechage round
Ivan Stoyanov (BUL) | 5
Muhamed Bektemirov (AUT) | 9
Micah Naisbet (GBR) | 0
Ion Marcu (MDA) | 10

Bronze medals
Muhamed Bektemirov (AUT) | 9
Javidan Ahmadov (AZE) | 10
Ion Marcu (MDA) | 10
Burak Emin Salviz (GER) | 0

== Men's freestyle 74 kg ==
1 and 2 July

Legend

- F — Won by fall

Final

| Final |
| Stas David Wolf (GER) | 4 |
| Hayk Papikyan (ARM) | 0 |

Top half

Round of 32
Giorgi Gogritchiani (GEO) | 2
Vadym Tsurkan (UKR) | 8^{F}

Round of 16
Akbar Valiyev (AZE) | 10
Robin Mikécz (SVK) | 0
Vadym Tsurkan (UKR) | 13
Vlad Stratan (MDA) | 2
Stas David Wolf (GER) | 7
Muhammed Ozmuş (TUR) | 7
Marian Subțirică (ROU) | 10
Adam Kakhriev (FRA) | 0

Quarterfinals
Akbar Valiyev (AZE) | 8
Vadym Tsurkan (UKR) | 8
Stas David Wolf (GER) | 17
Marian Subțirică (ROU) | 4

Semifinals
Vadym Tsurkan (UKR) | 2
Stas David Wolf (GER) | 3

Bottom half

Round of 32
Vartan Oganissian (ISR) | 4
Fabricio Reyes (ESP) | 4

Round of 16
Raul Caso (ITA) | 2
Kaloyan Atanasov (BUL) | 2
Hayk Papikyan (ARM) | 10
Fabian Niedźwiedzki (POL) | 0
Bálint Balázs (HUN) | 11
Vartan Oganissian (ISR) | 0
Theocharis Kougioumtsidis (GRE) | 2
Mukhammad Inshapiev (AUT) | 12

Quarterfinals
Raul Caso (ITA) | 2
Hayk Papikyan (ARM) | 3
Bálint Balázs (HUN) | 0
Mukhammad Inshapiev (AUT) | 10

Semifinals
Hayk Papikyan (ARM) | 6
Mukhammad Inshapiev (AUT) | 2

Repechage round 2
Muhammed Ozmuş (TUR) | 5
Marian Subțirică (ROU) | 0
Fabian Niedźwiedzki (POL) | 0
Raul Caso (ITA) | 8

Bronze medal match
Muhammed Ozmuş (TUR) | 6
Vadym Tsurkan (UKR) | 6
Raul Caso (ITA) | 10
Mukhammad Inshapiev (AUT) | 0

== Men's freestyle 79 kg ==
30 June and 1 July

Legend

- F — Won by fall

Final

| Final |
| Otari Adeishvili (GEO) | 10 |
| Gregor Eigenbrodt (GER) | 7 |

Top half

Round of 32
Georgios Terzidis (GRE) | 1
Sadig Mustafazade (AZE) | 9
Moisés Bello (ESP) | 0
Kimi Käppeli (SUI) | 10

Round of 16
Paulius Leščauskas (LTU) | 1
Otari Adeishvili (GEO) | 12
Sadig Mustafazade (AZE) | 8
Mateusz Pędzicki (POL) | 5
Bekir Öveç (TUR) | 11
Kimi Käppeli (SUI) | 0
Michal Vereš (SVK) | 0
Oleksandr Mamrosh (UKR) | 11

Quarterfinals
Otari Adeishvili (GEO) | 6
Sadig Mustafazade (AZE) | 2
Bekir Öveç (TUR) | 3
Oleksandr Mamrosh (UKR) | 1

Semifinals
Otari Adeishvili (GEO) | 12
Bekir Öveç (TUR) | 4

Bottom half

Round of 32
Ion Laurențiu Marcu (MDA) | 4
Radomir Stoyanov (BUL) | 9
Narek Grigoryan (ARM) | 4
Nándor Hajduch (HUN) | 2

Round of 16
Stefan Dimitrov (MKD) | 0
Raffaele Matrullo (ITA) | 10
Radomir Stoyanov (BUL) | 19
Lukas Lins (AUT) | 9
Vilhelm Larsson (SWE) | 0
Narek Grigoryan (ARM) | 11
Gregor Eigenbrodt (GER) | 5
Codei Khawaja (SRB) | 0

Quarterfinals
Raffaele Matrullo (ITA) | 2
Radomir Stoyanov (BUL) | 5
Narek Grigoryan (ARM) | 4
Gregor Eigenbrodt (GER) | 9

Semifinals
Radomir Stoyanov (BUL) | 3
Gregor Eigenbrodt (GER) | 6

Repechage round 2
Paulius Leščauskas (LTU) | 0
Sadig Mustafazade (AZE) | 10
Codei Khawaja (SRB) | 0
Narek Grigoryan (ARM) | 11

Bronze medals
Sadig Mustafazade (AZE) | 10
Bekir Öveç (TUR) | 0
Narek Grigoryan (ARM) | 4
Radomir Stoyanov (BUL) | 1

== Men's freestyle 86 kg ==
1 and 2 July

Legend

- C — Won by 3 cautions given to the opponent
- F — Won by fall
- WO — Won by walkover

Main bracket

Round of 16
Gabriele Niccolini (ITA) | 2
Ivan Chornohuz (UKR) | 11
Timur Gulmagomedov (AZE) | 4
Filip Błaszczyk (POL) | 1
Péter Zsivnovszki (HUN) | 4
Mushegh Mkrtchyan (ARM) | 11
Kiril Kildau (GER) | 6
Anton Vyhivskyi (SVK) | 2
Alexandru Borș (MDA) | 0
Emre Çiftçi (TUR) | 10
Rakhim Magamadov (FRA) | 11
Slavi Stamenov (BUL) | 0
Volodars Smirnovs (LAT) | 0
Tornike Samkharadze (GEO) | 12

Quarterfinals
Noah Schwaller (SUI) | 0
Ivan Chornohuz (UKR) | 11
Timur Gulmagomedov (AZE) | 3
Mushegh Mkrtchyan (ARM) | 3
Kiril Kildau (GER) | 5
Emre Çiftçi (TUR) | 9
Rakhim Magamadov (FRA) | 11
Tornike Samkharadze (GEO) | 0

Semifinals
Ivan Chornohuz (UKR) | 6
Mushegh Mkrtchyan (ARM) | 17
Emre Çiftçi (TUR) | 0
Rakhim Magamadov (FRA) | 10

Final
Mushegh Mkrtchyan (ARM) | 1
Rakhim Magamadov (FRA) | 12

Repechage round
Péter Zsivnovszki (HUN) | 1
Timur Gulmagomedov (AZE) | 12
Slavi Stamenov (BUL) | 5
Tornike Samkharadze (GEO) | 8

Bronze medals
Timur Gulmagomedov (AZE) | 5
Ivan Chornohuz (UKR) | 6^{C}
Tornike Samkharadze (GEO) | WO
Emre Çiftçi (TUR)

== Men's freestyle 92 kg ==
1 and 2 July

Legend

- F — Won by fall

Main bracket

Round of 16
Krisztián Angyal (HUN) | 12
Constantin Buza (MDA) | 8
Armanis Barsamyan (LTU) | 0
Ravan Musayev (AZE) | 10
Kacper Śledź (POL) | 1
Sali Saliev (BUL) | 11
Dāvids Pirozniks (LAT) | 8^{F}
Nikita Goubarets (ISR) | 8
Daniel Fischer (GER) | 10
Aimar Alzón (ESP) | 0
Oleh Kuzmenko-Taison (UKR) | 2
Grigoris Saridis (GRE) | 12
Giorgi Romelashvili (GEO) | 0
Muhammed Gimri (TUR) | 4

Quarterfinals
Knyaz Iboyan (ARM) | 9
Krisztián Angyal (HUN) | 0
Ravan Musayev (AZE) | 6
Sali Saliev (BUL) | 6
Dāvids Pirozniks (LAT) | 0
Daniel Fischer (GER) | 11
Grigoris Saridis (GRE) | 0
Muhammed Gimri (TUR) | 11

Semifinals
Knyaz Iboyan (ARM) | 10^{F}
Sali Saliev (BUL) | 1
Daniel Fischer (GER) | 1
Muhammed Gimri (TUR) | 8

Final
Knyaz Iboyan (ARM) | 3
Muhammed Gimri (TUR) | 2

Repechage round
Giorgi Romelashvili (GEO) | 9
Grigoris Saridis (GRE) | 9

Bronze medals
Krisztián Angyal (HUN) | 2
Sali Saliev (BUL) | 5
Grigoris Saridis (GRE) | 7
Daniel Fischer (GER) | 17

== Men's freestyle 97 kg ==
30 June and 1 July

Legend

- C — Won by 3 cautions given to the opponent
- F — Won by fall

Main bracket

Round of 16
Florin Tripon (ROU) | 2
Adam Jakšík (SVK) | 12
Ivan Prymachenko (UKR) | 10
Askerkhan Khounkaev (FRA) | 0
Zafar Aliyev (AZE) | 13
Enrique Jiménez (ESP) | 0
Taron Shahinyan (POL) | 4^{F}
Dmitrii Dușcov (MDA) | 4
Gurgen Simonyan (ARM) | 1
Doğan Uzun (TUR) | 7

Quarterfinals
Andrejs Lipiņš (LAT) | 0
Adam Jakšík (SVK) | 10
Ivan Prymachenko (UKR) | 2
Zafar Aliyev (AZE) | 0
Nika Pantsulaia (GEO) | 8
Taron Shahinyan (POL) | 0
Doğan Uzun (TUR) | 4^{F}
Denislav Dimitrov (BUL) | 0

Semifinals
Adam Jakšík (SVK) | 2
Ivan Prymachenko (UKR) | 12
Nika Pantsulaia (GEO) | 2
Doğan Uzun (TUR) | 6

Final
Ivan Prymachenko (UKR) | 5
Doğan Uzun (TUR) | 0

Repechage round
Askerkhan Khounkaev (FRA) | 2
Zafar Aliyev (AZE) | 10
Gurgen Simonyan (ARM) | 14^{C}
Denislav Dimitrov (BUL) | 4

Bronze medals
Zafar Aliyev (AZE) | 12
Adam Jakšík (SVK) | 5
Gurgen Simonyan (ARM) | 2
Nika Pantsulaia (GEO) | 5

== Men's freestyle 125 kg ==
1 and 2 July

Legend

- F — Won by fall

Main bracket

Round of 16
Roope Kataja (FIN) | 2
Mariyan Nikolov (BUL) | 1
Adolf Bazsó (HUN) | 2
Levan Lagvilava (FRA) | 9

Quarterfinals
Yusif Dursunov (AZE) | 11
Roope Kataja (FIN) | 0
Volodymyr Kochanov (UKR) | 6^{F}
Zurab Romelashvili (GEO) | 0
Ksawery Kamiński (POL) | 0
Hakan Büyükçıngıl (TUR) | 10
Levan Lagvilava (FRA) | 4^{F}
Nicolae Stratulat (MDA) | 0

Semifinals
Yusif Dursunov (AZE) | 4
Volodymyr Kochanov (UKR) | 0
Hakan Büyükçıngıl (TUR) | 12
Levan Lagvilava (FRA) | 0

Final
Yusif Dursunov (AZE) | 1
Hakan Büyükçıngıl (TUR) | 8

Bronze medal match
Roope Kataja (FIN) | 0
Volodymyr Kochanov (UKR) | 7^{F}
Ksawery Kamiński (POL) | 2
Levan Lagvilava (FRA) | 9

== See also ==
- 2023 European Juniors Wrestling Championships – Men's Greco-Roman
- 2023 European Juniors Wrestling Championships – Women's freestyle
