= 2025 European Wrestling Championships – Women's freestyle 59 kg =

Wrestling competition

Women's freestyle 59 kg at the 2025 European Wrestling Championships
- Venue: X-Bionic Sphere
- Location: Bratislava, Slovakia
- Dates: 9-10 April
- Competitors: 12

Medalists
gold medal	Anastasiia Sidelnikova
silver medal	Bediha Gün	Turkey
bronze medal	Alina Filipovych	Ukraine
bronze medal	Aurora Russo	Italy

The women's freestyle 59 kg is a competition featured at the 2025 European Wrestling Championships, and was held in Bratislava, Slovakia on April 9 and 10.

== Results ==
Legend

- F — Won by fall

=== Main bracket ===
Round of 16
Jowita Wrzesień (POL)	11
Anna Michalcová (CZE)	1
Alina Filipovych (UKR)	10
Lara Görcs (SVK)	0
Aurora Russo (ITA)	1
Bediha Gün (TUR)	2
Fatme Shaban (BUL)	0
Alesia Hetmanava (UWW)	10

Quarterfinals
Erika Bognár (HUN)	6
Jowita Wrzesień (POL)	3
Alina Filipovych (UKR)	3
Anastasiia Sidelnikova (UWW)	7
Mariana Cherdivara (MDA)	0
Bediha Gün (TUR)	2
Alesia Hetmanava (UWW)	2
Alyona Kolesnik (AZE)	7

Semifinals
Erika Bognár (HUN)	0
Anastasiia Sidelnikova (UWW)	6
Bediha Gün (TUR)	3
Alyona Kolesnik (AZE)	0

Final
Anastasiia Sidelnikova (UWW)	4
Bediha Gün (TUR)	2

=== Repechage ===
Repechage round 1
Aurora Russo (ITA)	2
Mariana Cherdivara (MDA)	2

Bronze medal match
Alina Filipovych (UKR)	3
Erika Bognár (HUN)	2
Aurora Russo (ITA)	3
Alyona Kolesnik (AZE)	1

== Final standing ==
Rank	Athlete
1st place, gold medalist(s)	Anastasiia Sidelnikova (UWW)
2nd place, silver medalist(s)	Bediha Gün (TUR)
3rd place, bronze medalist(s)	Alina Filipovych (UKR)
3rd place, bronze medalist(s)	Aurora Russo (ITA)
5	Erika Bognár (HUN)
5	Alyona Kolesnik (AZE)
7	Jowita Wrzesień (POL)
8	Alesia Hetmanava (UWW)
9	Mariana Cherdivara (MDA)
10	Anna Michalcová (CZE)
11	Lara Görcs (SVK)
12	Fatme Shaban (BUL)
