= 2024 U23 World Wrestling Championships – Women's freestyle 57 kg =

Wrestling competitions

Women's freestyle 57 kg at the 2024 U23 World Championships
- Venue: Tirana Olympic Park
- Dates: 24–25 October
- Competitors: 15 from 13 nations

Medalists
gold medal	Zhala Aliyeva	Azerbaijan
silver medal	Ruka Natami	Japan
bronze medal	Neha Sharma	India
bronze medal	Alina Filipovych	Ukraine

The women's freestyle 57 is a competition featured at the 2024 U23 World Wrestling Championships, and will be held in Tirana, Albania on 24 and 25 October 2024.

This freestyle wrestling competition consists of a single-elimination tournament, with a repechage used to determine the winner of two bronze medals. The two finalists face off for gold and silver medals. Each wrestler who loses to one of the two finalists moves into the repechage, culminating in a pair of bronze medal matches featuring the semifinal losers each facing the remaining repechage opponent from their half of the bracket.

== Results ==
Legend

- F — Won by fall

=== Main bracket ===
Round of 16
Mia Friesen (CAN)	9
Shugyla Omirbek (KAZ)	2
Patrycja Strzelczyk (POL)	1
Aryna Martynava (AIN)	11
Zhang Mingyue (CHN)	0
Ruka Natami (JPN)	10^{F}
Anastasia Kozlova (AIN)	4
Céleste Sion (FRA)	0
Bertha Rojas (MEX)	9
Sofia Macaluso (USA)	11
Zhala Aliyeva (AZE)	7
Alina Filipovych (UKR)	4
Jana Petrović (SRB)	0
Sevim Akbaş (TUR)	10

Quarterfinals
Neha Sharma (IND)	9
Mia Friesen (CAN)	4
Aryna Martynava (AIN)	1
Ruka Natami (JPN)	2^{F}
Anastasia Kozlova (AIN)	1
Sofia Macaluso (USA)	4
Zhala Aliyeva (AZE)	10
Sevim Akbaş (TUR)	0

Semifinals
Neha Sharma (IND)	2
Ruka Natami (JPN)	3
Sofia Macaluso (USA)	0
Zhala Aliyeva (AZE)	10^{F}

Final
Ruka Natami (JPN)	8
Zhala Aliyeva (AZE)	10

=== Repechage ===
Repechage round 1
Zhang Mingyue (CHN)	11
Aryna Martynava (AIN)	3
Alina Filipovych (UKR)	2^{F}
Sevim Akbaş (TUR)	0

Bronze medals
Zhang Mingyue (CHN)	0
Neha Sharma (IND)	5
Alina Filipovych (UKR)	8
Sofia Macaluso (USA)	4

== Final standing ==
Rank	Athlete
1st place, gold medalist(s)	Zhala Aliyeva (AZE)
2nd place, silver medalist(s)	Ruka Natami (JPN)
3rd place, bronze medalist(s)	Neha Sharma (IND)
3rd place, bronze medalist(s)	Alina Filipovych (UKR)
5	Zhang Mingyue (CHN)
5	Sofia Macaluso (USA)
7	Aryna Martynava (AIN)
8	Sevim Akbaş (TUR)
9	Mia Friesen (CAN)
10	Anastasia Kozlova (AIN)
11	Bertha Rojas (MEX)
12	Shugyla Omirbek (KAZ)
13	Patrycja Strzelczyk (POL)
14	Celeste Sion (FRA)
15	Jana Petrović (SRB)
