= Patrycja Gil =

Polish freestyle wrestler

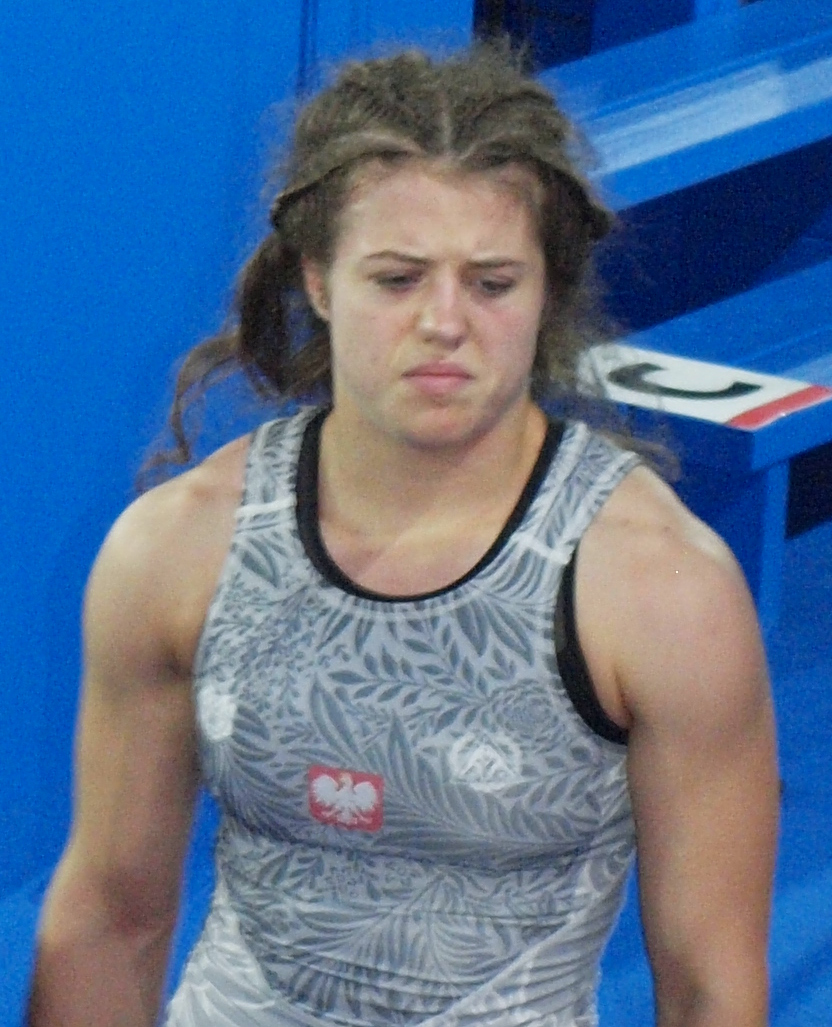

Personal information
- Born: 29 April 1999 (age 27) Poland
- Height: 1.60 m (5 ft 3 in)
- Weight: 59 kg (130 lb; 9.3 st)

Sport
- Country: Poland
- Sport: Women's freestyle wrestling
- Event: 59 kg
Medal record
Women's freestyle wrestling
Representing Poland
European Championships
Bronze medal – third place	2024 Bucharest	59 kg
Grand Prix
Bronze medal – third place	2022 Rome	57 kg
Bronze medal – third place	2022 Madrid	57 kg
European U23 Championship
Silver medal – second place	2021 Skopje	57 kg
Silver medal – second place	2022 Plovdiv	57 kg
World Juniors Championships
Gold medal – first place	2019 Tallinn	55 kg
European Juniors Championships
Bronze medal – third place	2019 Pontevedra	55 kg

Patrycja Gil (born 29 April 1999) is a Polish freestyle wrestler competing in the 59 kg division.

== Career ==
In 2024, she won one of the bronze medals in the women's freestyle 59 kg event at the European Wrestling Championships held in Bucharest, Romania. She defeated Kateryna Zydaczewska of Romania in her bronze medal match.

== Achievements ==
Year	Tournament	Location	Result	Event
2024	European Championships	Bucharest, Romania	3rd	Freestyle 59 kg
