= 2024 European Wrestling Championships – Women's freestyle 59 kg =

Wrestling competition

Women's freestyle 59 kg at the 2024 European Wrestling Championships
- Venue: Polyvalent Hall
- Location: Bucharest, Romania
- Dates: 14-15 February
- Competitors: 13

Medalists
| gold medal | Alyona Kolesnik | Azerbaijan |
| silver medal | Alina Filipovych | Ukraine |
| bronze medal | Patrycja Gil | Poland |
| bronze medal | Alesia Hetmanava | Individual Neutral Athletes |

The women's freestyle 59 kg is a competition featured at the 2024 European Wrestling Championships, and held in Bucharest, Romania on February 14 and 15.

== Results ==
Legend

- F — Won by fall

=== Main bracket ===
Round of 16
Ramina Mamedova (LAT) | 2
Kateryna Zydaczewska (ROU) | 10^{F}
Kelsey Barnes (GBR) | 2
Ekaterina Poleshchuk (AIN) | 10^{F}
Patrycja Gil (POL) | 17
Fatme Shaban (BUL) | 6
Alesia Hetmanava (AIN) | 8
Eda Tekin (TUR) | 7
Sandra Paruszewski (GER) | 0
Anastasia Nichita (MDA) | 10

Quarterfinals
Alyona Kolesnik (AZE) | 4^{F}
Kateryna Zydaczewska (ROU) | 0
Ekaterina Poleshchuk (AIN) | 2
Patrycja Gil (POL) | 4
Alina Filipovych (UKR) | 7
Alesia Hetmanava (AIN) | 6
Anastasia Nichita (MDA) | 6
Tamara Dollák (HUN) | 2

Semifinals
Alyona Kolesnik (AZE) | 7
Patrycja Gil (POL) | 3
Alina Filipovych (UKR) | WO
Anastasia Nichita (MDA)

Final
Alyona Kolesnik (AZE) | 3
Alina Filipovych (UKR) | 3

=== Repechage ===
Bronze medal match
Kateryna Zydaczewska (ROU) | 2
Patrycja Gil (POL) | 7^{F}
Alesia Hetmanava (AIN) | WO
Anastasia Nichita (MDA)

== Final standing ==
| Rank | Athlete |
|---|---|
| 1st place, gold medalist(s) | Alyona Kolesnik (AZE) |
| 2nd place, silver medalist(s) | Alina Filipovych (UKR) |
| 3rd place, bronze medalist(s) | Patrycja Gil (POL) |
| 3rd place, bronze medalist(s) | Alesia Hetmanava (AIN) |
| 5 | Kateryna Zydaczewska (ROU) |
| 5 | Anastasia Nichita (MDA) |
| 7 | Ekaterina Poleshchuk (AIN) |
| 8 | Eda Tekin (TUR) |
| 9 | Fatme Shaban (BUL) |
| 10 | Tamara Dollák (HUN) |
| 11 | Ramina Mamedova (LAT) |
| 12 | Kelsey Barnes (GBR) |
| 13 | Sandra Paruszewski (GER) |
