= 2023 World Junior Wrestling Championships – Women's freestyle =

The women's freestyle competitions at the 2023 World Junior Wrestling Championships will be held in Amman, Jordan between 16 and 18 August 2023.

== Women's freestyle ==
=== 50 kg ===
16 and 17 August

Legend

- F — Won by fall

Final

Final
Audrey Jimenez (USA)	0
Li Yanrong (CHN)	8^{F}

Top half

Round of 32
Miruko Sakane (JPN)	10
María Cazalla (ESP)	0

Round of 16
Zerda Demir (TUR)	6
Audrey Jimenez (USA)	16
Miruko Sakane (JPN)	2
Priyanshi Prajapat (IND)	2
Julia Michniewicz (POL)	3
Lin Yi-hui (TPE)	6
Réka Hegedüs (SVK)	2
Elvina Karimzada (AZE)	1

Quarterfinals
Audrey Jimenez (USA)	4
Miruko Sakane (JPN)	2
Lin Yi-hui (TPE)	4
Réka Hegedüs (SVK)	2^{F}

Semifinals
Audrey Jimenez (USA)	12
Réka Hegedüs (SVK)	2

Bottom half

Round of 32
Laura Ganikyzy (KAZ)	7
Aleksandra Kopylova (ANA)	4
Georgiana Antuca (ROU)	8^{F}
Mariana Rojas (VEN)	0

Round of 16
Serena Di Benedetto (CAN)	16
Viktoriia Slobodeniuk (UKR)	18
Laura Ganikyzy (KAZ)	10
Karolína Müllerová (CZE)	0
Svenja Jungo (SUI)	6
Georgiana Antuca (ROU)	3
Li Yanrong (CHN)	16
Sviatlana Katenka (ANA)	6

Quarterfinals
Viktoriia Slobodeniuk (UKR)	6
Laura Ganikyzy (KAZ)	0
Svenja Jungo (SUI)	0
Li Yanrong (CHN)	8^{F}

Semifinals
Viktoriia Slobodeniuk (UKR)	2
Li Yanrong (CHN)	2^{F}

Repechage round 2
Zerda Demir (TUR)	2
Miruko Sakane (JPN)	8
Sviatlana Katenka (ANA)	2
Svenja Jungo (SUI)	4

Bronze medal match
Miruko Sakane (JPN)	10
Réka Hegedüs (SVK)	0
Svenja Jungo (SUI)	2
Viktoriia Slobodeniuk (UKR)	5^{F}

=== 53 kg ===
17 and 18 August

Legend

- F — Won by fall

Final

Final
Mariia Yefremova (UKR)	0
Antim Panghal (IND)	4

Top half

Round of 32
Ana Rotaru (ROU)	4
Carla Jaume (ESP)	14
Amory Andrich (GER)	4
Emine Çakmak (TUR)	2

Round of 16
Altyn Shagayeva (KAZ)	12
Dilshoda Matnazarova (UZB)	2
Carla Jaume (ESP)	0
Katie Gomez (USA)	10
Gultakin Shirinova (AZE)	11
Amory Andrich (GER)	0
Nikol Krumova (BUL)	0
Mariia Yefremova (UKR)	4^{F}

Quarterfinals
Altyn Shagayeva (KAZ)	0
Katie Gomez (USA)	10
Gultakin Shirinova (AZE)	0
Mariia Yefremova (UKR)	2^{F}

Semifinals
Katie Gomez (USA)	0
Mariia Yefremova (UKR)	2^{F}

Bottom half

Round of 32
Liang Xuejing (CHN)	2
Marta Hetmanava (ANA)	1
Khrystyna Basych (SVK)	12
Shaimaa Atef Mohamed (EGY)	3

Round of 16
Antim Panghal (IND)	10^{F}
Nikola Wiśniewska (POL)	0
Liang Xuejing (CHN)	10
Noura Taaibin (JOR)	0
Polina Lukina (ANA)	4^{F}
Khrystyna Basych (SVK)	7
Nagisa Harada (JPN)	8^{F}
Mihaela Samoil (MDA)	2

Quarterfinals
Antim Panghal (IND)	12
Liang Xuejing (CHN)	2
Polina Lukina (ANA)	8
Nagisa Harada (JPN)	7

Semifinals
Antim Panghal (IND)	12
Polina Lukina (ANA)	0

Repechage round 2
Nikol Krumova (BUL)	0
Gultakin Shirinova (AZE)	10
Nikola Wiśniewska (POL)	0
Liang Xuejing (CHN)	8^{F}

Bronze medal match
Gultakin Shirinova (AZE)	9
Katie Gomez (USA)	4
Liang Xuejing (CHN)	7
Polina Lukina (ANA)	4

=== 55 kg ===
16 and 17 August

Legend

- F — Won by fall

Final

Final
Aryna Martynava (ANA)	10
Georgiana Lircă (ROU)	0

Top half

Round of 32
Diana Antropova (ANA)	5^{F}
Aruuke Kadyrbek Kyzy (KGZ)	4

Round of 16
Zeinep Bayanova (KAZ)	14
Milica Sekulović (SRB)	4
Diana Antropova (ANA)	0
Albina Rillia (UKR)	4^{F}
Amani Jones (USA)	11
Lina Niţă (MDA)	1
Aysanem Kurbanbaeva (UZB)	0
Aryna Martynava (ANA)	10

Quarterfinals
Zeinep Bayanova (KAZ)	3
Albina Rillia (UKR)	4
Amani Jones (USA)	0
Aryna Martynava (ANA)	10

Semifinals
Albina Rillia (UKR)	0
Aryna Martynava (ANA)	11

Bottom half

Round of 32

Round of 16
Jyoti Sihag (IND)	0
Tuba Demir (TUR)	10
Sophia Bechard (CAN)	0
Moe Kiyooka (JPN)	10
Róza Szenttamási (HUN)	4^{F}
Asmar Jankurtaran (AZE)	2
Georgiana Lircă (ROU)	8^{F}
Felicitas Domajeva (NOR)	2

Quarterfinals
Tuba Demir (TUR)	0
Moe Kiyooka (JPN)	11
Róza Szenttamási (HUN)	2
Georgiana Lircă (ROU)	6^{F}

Semifinals
Moe Kiyooka (JPN)	2
Georgiana Lircă (ROU)	4^{F}

Repechage round 2
Aysanem Kurbanbaeva (UZB)	4
Amani Jones (USA)	7
Felicitas Domajeva (NOR)	2
Róza Szenttamási (HUN)	12

Bronze medal match
Amani Jones (USA)	5
Albina Rillia (UKR)	5
Róza Szenttamási (HUN)	0
Moe Kiyooka (JPN)	10

=== 57 kg ===
17 and 18 August

Legend

- F — Won by fall

Final

Final
Ichika Arai (JPN)	3
Alina Filipovych (UKR)	5

Top half

Round of 32
Louji Walid Yassin (EGY)	8^{F}
Helena van As (RSA)	0
Naemi Leistner (GER)	0
Tatiana Ileva (ANA)	2^{F}
Aitolkun Medet Kyzy (KGZ)	4
Gerda Terék (HUN)	5

Round of 16
Ichika Arai (JPN)	11
Jana Petrović (SRB)	0
Louji Walid Yassin (EGY)	5
Gabriela Cross (CAN)	5
Petra Mráčková (CZE)	14^{F}
Tatiana Ileva (ANA)	4
Gerda Terék (HUN)	4
Ulmeken Esenbaeva (UZB)	3

Quarterfinals
Ichika Arai (JPN)	5
Gabriela Cross (CAN)	0
Petra Mráčková (CZE)	0
Gerda Terék (HUN)	4^{F}

Semifinals
Ichika Arai (JPN)	5
Gerda Terék (HUN)	3

Bottom half

Round of 32
Camila Amarilla (ARG)	3
Shugyla Omirbek (KAZ)	4^{F}
Şevval Çayır (TUR)	2
Alina Filipovych (UKR)	14

Round of 16
Liao Pei-ying (TPE)	1
Patrycja Strzelczyk (POL)	5
Shugyla Omirbek (KAZ)	8^{F}
Wang Mingjiao (CHN)	6
Reena Sangwan (IND)	0
Alina Filipovych (UKR)	6^{F}
Cristelle Rodriguez (USA)	6
Volha Hardzei (ANA)	8

Quarterfinals
Patrycja Strzelczyk (POL)	1
Shugyla Omirbek (KAZ)	2
Alina Filipovych (UKR)	10
Volha Hardzei (ANA)	0

Semifinals
Shugyla Omirbek (KAZ)	4
Alina Filipovych (UKR)	10^{F}

Repechage round 1
Şevval Çayır (TUR)	0
Reena Sangwan (IND)	10

Repechage round 2
Jana Petrović (SRB)	0
Gabriela Cross (CAN)	10
Reena Sangwan (IND)	4
Volha Hardzei (ANA)	2

Bronze medal match
Gabriela Cross (CAN)	2
Gerda Terék (HUN)	12
Reena Sangwan (IND)	9
Shugyla Omirbek (KAZ)	4

=== 59 kg ===
16 and 17 August

Legend

- F — Won by fall

Final

Final
Alesia Hetmanava (ANA)	1
Aurora Russo (ITA)	4

Top half

Round of 32
Mia Olivier (FRA)	0
Aleksandra Witos (POL)	4^{F}
Kalmira Bilimbek Kyzy (KGZ)	11
Sarbinaz Jienbaeva (UZB)	1

Round of 16
Sevim Akbaş (TUR)	4
Nitika Kataria (IND)	3
Aleksandra Witos (POL)	0
Alesia Hetmanava (ANA)	10
Madina Aman (KAZ)	1
Kalmira Bilimbek Kyzy (KGZ)	8^{F}
Kanami Yamanouchi (JPN)	10
Nawel Bahloul (ALG)	1

Quarterfinals
Sevim Akbaş (TUR)	0
Alesia Hetmanava (ANA)	10
Kalmira Bilimbek Kyzy (KGZ)	10
Kanami Yamanouchi (JPN)	0

Semifinals
Alesia Hetmanava (ANA)	6
Kalmira Bilimbek Kyzy (KGZ)	4

Bottom half

Round of 32
Annatina Lippuner (SUI)	12
Yuliia Pakhniuk (UKR)	2
Caitlin Clatney (CAN)	5
Lana Nogić (CRO)	8

Round of 16
Jovana Radivojević (SRB)	0
Alexis Janiak (USA)	10
Annatina Lippuner (SUI)	13
Farah Ali Hussein (EGY)	2
Aurora Russo (ITA)	10
Lana Nogić (CRO)	0
Elena Kurova (ANA)	14^{F}
Luna Rothenberger (GER)	1

Quarterfinals
Alexis Janiak (USA)	4^{F}
Annatina Lippuner (SUI)	0
Aurora Russo (ITA)	7
Elena Kurova (ANA)	2

Semifinals
Alexis Janiak (USA)	8
Aurora Russo (ITA)	9

Repechage round 2
Aleksandra Witos (POL)	3
Sevim Akbaş (TUR)	9
Lana Nogić (CRO)	0
Elena Kurova (ANA)	6^{F}

Bronze medal match
Sevim Akbaş (TUR)	0
Kalmira Bilimbek Kyzy (KGZ)	11
Elena Kurova (ANA)	0
Alexis Janiak (USA)	11

=== 62 kg ===
17 and 18 August

Legend

- F — Won by fall

Final

Final
Savita Dalal (IND)	10
Astrid Montero (VEN)	0

Top half

Round of 32
Tynys Dubek (KAZ)	2
Selvi İlyasoğlu (TUR)	12

Round of 16
Savita Dalal (IND)	8^{F}
Dunja Lukić (SRB)	0
Selvi İlyasoğlu (TUR)	0
Suzu Sasaki (JPN)	10
Yana Tretsiak (ANA)	6
Olha Padoshyk (POL)	5
Milena Fedorova (ANA)	2
Iris Thiébaux (FRA)	8

Quarterfinals
Savita Dalal (IND)	8^{F}
Suzu Sasaki (JPN)	6
Yana Tretsiak (ANA)	0
Iris Thiébaux (FRA)	3

Semifinals
Savita Dalal (IND)	3^{F}
Iris Thiébaux (FRA)	0

Bottom half

Round of 32
Zharkynai Nurlan Kyzy (KGZ)	0
Wei Shuyue (CHN)	8^{F}

Round of 16
Adaugo Nwachukwu (USA)	12^{F}
Ana-Maria Crețu (MDA)	2
Vanja Gersak-Perez (GER)	0
Melanie Jiménez (MEX)	9^{F}
Iryna Bondar (UKR)	11
Wei Shuyue (CHN)	0
Astrid Montero (VEN)	10
Mayara Ramos (BRA)	0

Quarterfinals
Adaugo Nwachukwu (USA)	7
Melanie Jiménez (MEX)	9
Iryna Bondar (UKR)	3
Astrid Montero (VEN)	4

Semifinals
Melanie Jiménez (MEX)	0
Astrid Montero (VEN)	8

Repechage round 2
Dunja Lukić (SRB)	0
Suzu Sasaki (JPN)	10
Mayara Ramos (BRA)	0
Iryna Bondar (UKR)	10

Bronze medal match
Suzu Sasaki (JPN)	10
Iris Thiébaux (FRA)	0
Iryna Bondar (UKR)	3
Melanie Jiménez (MEX)	3

=== 65 kg ===
17 and 18 August

Legend

- F — Won by fall

Final

Final
Antim Kundu (IND)	2
Enikő Elekes (HUN)	9

Top half

Round of 32
Gerda Barth (GER)	9
Maša Perović (SRB)	9

Round of 16
Tancholpon Kybalbekova (KGZ)	0
Ekaterina Koshkina (ANA)	4^{F}
Gerda Barth (GER)	1
Nikoleta Barmpa (GRE)	10
Maria Panțîru (ROU)	2
Antim Kundu (IND)	7
Alicja Nowosad (POL)	10
Chien Pei-shan (TPE)	0

Quarterfinals
Ekaterina Koshkina (ANA)	2^{F}
Nikoleta Barmpa (GRE)	0
Antim Kundu (IND)	6^{F}
Alicja Nowosad (POL)	0

Semifinals
Ekaterina Koshkina (ANA)	5
Antim Kundu (IND)	9

Bottom half

Round of 32

Round of 16
Iryna Borysiuk (UKR)	1
Khadija Jlassi (TUN)	11
Korlan Amanova (KAZ)	0
Momoko Kitade (JPN)	10
Kseniya Tsiarenia (ANA)	6^{F}
Madeline Kubicki (USA)	0
Duygu Gen (TUR)	1
Enikő Elekes (HUN)	5

Quarterfinals
Khadija Jlassi (TUN)	6
Momoko Kitade (JPN)	5
Kseniya Tsiarenia (ANA)	0
Enikő Elekes (HUN)	11

Semifinals
Khadija Jlassi (TUN)	0
Enikő Elekes (HUN)	7

Repechage round 2
Maria Panțîru (ROU)	6^{F}
Alicja Nowosad (POL)	2
Duygu Gen (TUR)	0
Kseniya Tsiarenia (ANA)	8^{F}

Bronze medal match
Maria Panțîru (ROU)	14
Ekaterina Koshkina (ANA)	4
Kseniya Tsiarenia (ANA)	10^{F}
Khadija Jlassi (TUN)	4

=== 68 kg ===
16 and 17 August

Legend

- F — Won by fall
- R — Retired

Main bracket

Round of 16
Elizaveta Petliakova (ANA)	6^{F}
Elif Kurt (TUR)	0
Menatalla Badran (EGY)	4
Zhibekzhan Sabyrzhanova (KAZ)	0^{R}
Arju (IND)	11
Rui Zaixun (CHN)	0
Luciana Beda (MDA)	1
Sophia Schäfle (GER)	1
Gulnura Tashtanbekova (KGZ)	4
Alina Shauchuk (ANA)	6
Gilbery García (VEN)	4
Laura Godino (ITA)	5
Manola Skobelska (UKR)	8
Bella Mir (USA)	12
Ray Hoshino (JPN)	5^{F}
Karolina Jaworska (POL)	0

Quarterfinals
Elizaveta Petliakova (ANA)	3^{F}
Menatalla Badran (EGY)	2
Arju (IND)	10^{F}
Sophia Schäfle (GER)	0
Alina Shauchuk (ANA)	8
Laura Godino (ITA)	1
Bella Mir (USA)	1
Ray Hoshino (JPN)	12

Semifinals
Elizaveta Petliakova (ANA)	6
Arju (IND)	3
Alina Shauchuk (ANA)	4
Ray Hoshino (JPN)	9

Final
Elizaveta Petliakova (ANA)	3
Ray Hoshino (JPN)	4

Repechage round
Elif Kurt (TUR)	1
Menatalla Badran (EGY)	1
Karolina Jaworska (POL)	5
Bella Mir (USA)	8^{F}

Bronze medal match
Elif Kurt (TUR)	1
Arju (IND)	8
Bella Mir (USA)	1
Alina Shauchuk (ANA)	8

=== 72 kg ===
17 and 18 August

Legend

- F — Won by fall

Final

Final
Bükrenaz Sert (TUR)	0
Amit Elor (USA)	11

Top half

Round of 32
Mardona Kadamova (UZB)	0
Milla Anđelić (CRO)	4^{F}

Round of 16
Noémi Osváth-Nagy (HUN)	2
Iryna Zablotska (UKR)	3^{F}
Milla Anđelić (CRO)	6
Harshita Mor (IND)	7^{F}
Bükrenaz Sert (TUR)	10
Julia Lötscher (SUI)	0
Heba Sapry (EGY)	4
Emilia Creciun (MDA)	8

Quarterfinals
Iryna Zablotska (UKR)	3
Harshita Mor (IND)	4
Bükrenaz Sert (TUR)	6
Emilia Creciun (MDA)	1

Semifinals
Harshita Mor (IND)	1
Bükrenaz Sert (TUR)	2^{F}

Bottom half

Round of 32
Ksenia Samuilova (ANA)	4
Vanesa Georgieva (BUL)	6

Round of 16
Viktoryia Radzkova (ANA)	1
Yuka Fujikura (JPN)	5
Kaiyrkul Sharshebaeva (KGZ)	12
Paige Maher (CAN)	2
Patrycja Cuber (POL)	4^{F}
Vanesa Georgieva (BUL)	4
Amit Elor (USA)	10
Shamshiyabanu Tastanbek (KAZ)	0

Quarterfinals
Yuka Fujikura (JPN)	6
Kaiyrkul Sharshebaeva (KGZ)	0
Patrycja Cuber (POL)	0
Amit Elor (USA)	5^{F}

Semifinals
Yuka Fujikura (JPN)	0
Amit Elor (USA)	10

Repechage round 2
Julia Lötscher (SUI)	0
Emilia Creciun (MDA)	2^{F}
Shamshiyabanu Tastanbek (KAZ)	2
Patrycja Cuber (POL)	11

Bronze medal match
Emilia Creciun (MDA)	0
Harshita Mor (IND)	6^{F}
Patrycja Cuber (POL)	1
Yuka Fujikura (JPN)	10

=== 76 kg ===
16 and 17 August

Legend

- F — Won by fall

Main bracket

Round of 16
Mariia Zenkina (UKR)	0
Kennedy Blades (USA)	10
Priya Malik (IND)	4
Mariia Silina (ANA)	0
Aliaksandra Kazlova (ANA)	7^{F}
Jiang Lin (TPE)	2
Melisa Sarıtaç (TUR)	0
Liu Cancan (CHN)	6
Myah Phillips (CAN)	0
Veronika Nyikos (HUN)	6
Laura Kühn (GER)	4^{F}
Alina Yertostik (KAZ)	0

Quarterfinals
Ayano Moro (JPN)	3
Kennedy Blades (USA)	4
Priya Malik (IND)	11
Aliaksandra Kazlova (ANA)	0
Liu Cancan (CHN)	5
Veronika Nyikos (HUN)	9^{F}
Laura Kühn (GER)	12
Daniela Tkachuk (POL)	6

Semifinals
Kennedy Blades (USA)	0
Priya Malik (IND)	10
Veronika Nyikos (HUN)	4
Laura Kühn (GER)	9

Final
Priya Malik (IND)	5
Laura Kühn (GER)	0

Repechage round
Mariia Silina (ANA)	10
Aliaksandra Kazlova (ANA)	0
Alina Yertostik (KAZ)	0
Daniela Tkachuk (POL)	6^{F}

Bronze medal match
Mariia Silina (ANA)	2
Kennedy Blades (USA)	6
Daniela Tkachuk (POL)	5
Veronika Nyikos (HUN)	10^{F}

== See also ==
- 2023 World Junior Wrestling Championships – Men's freestyle
- 2023 World Junior Wrestling Championships – Men's Greco-Roman
