= Alesia Hetmanava =

Belarusian freestyle wrestler

Personal information
- Born: 19 September 2003 (age 22) Babruysk, Belarus
- Height: 1.60 m (5 ft 3 in)
- Weight: 59 kg (130 lb; 9.3 st)

Sport
- Country: Belarus
- Sport: Women's freestyle wrestling
- Event: 59 kg
Medal record
Women's freestyle wrestling
Representing Individual Neutral Athletes
European Championships
Bronze medal – third place	2024 Bucharest	59 kg
European U23 Championship
Gold medal – first place	2024 Baku	59 kg
World Junior Championships
Silver medal – second place	2023 Amman	59 kg
Representing Belarus
Dan Kolov - Nikola Petrov Tournament
Bronze medal – third place	2022 Veliko Tarnovo	57 kg
World Juniors Championships
Gold medal – first place	2021 Ufa	55 kg
World Cadets Championships
Bronze medal – third place	2019 Sofia	53 kg
European Cadets Championships
Bronze medal – third place	2019 Faenza	53 kg

Alesia Hetmanava (Belarusian: Алеся Міхайлаўна Гетманава; (born 19 September 2003) is a Belarusian freestyle wrestler competing in the 59 kg division.

== Career ==
In 2024, she won one of the bronze medals in the women's freestyle 59 kg event at the European Wrestling Championships held in Bucharest, Romania.

== Achievements ==
Year	Tournament	Location	Result	Event
2024	European Championships	Bucharest, Romania	3rd	Freestyle 59 kg
