= Alina Filipovych =

Ukrainian wrestler (born 2005)

Personal information
- Native name: Аліна Філіпович
- Born: 4 July 2005 (age 21) Kalush, Ivano-Frankivsk Oblast, Ukraine

Sport
- Weight class: 59 kg
- Event: Freestyle
Medal record
Women's freestyle wrestling
Representing Ukraine
European Championships
Silver medal – second place	2024 Bucharest	59 kg
Bronze medal – third place	2025 Bratislava	59 kg
World U23 Championships
Gold medal – first place	2026 Las Vegas	59 kg
Bronze medal – third place	2024 Tirana	57 kg
European U23 Championships
Silver medal – second place	2025 Tirana	57 kg
Silver medal – second place	2026 Zrenjanin	57 kg
World Junior Championships
Gold medal – first place	2023 Amman	57 kg
European Junior Championships
Gold medal – first place	2023 Santiago de Compostela	57 kg
Gold medal – first place	2024 Novi Sad	57 kg
World Cadets Championships
Bronze medal – third place	2021 Budapest	53 kg
European Cadets Championships
Bronze medal – third place	2022 Bucharest	57 kg

Alina Maryanivna Filipovych (Ukrainian: Аліна Мар'янівна Філіпович, born 4 July 2005) is a Ukrainian freestyle wrestler. She is a European Championships silver medalist in 59 kg event.

== Career ==
- In 2021, Alina won a bronze medal at the 2021 World Cadet Wrestling Championships, held in Budapest, in 53 kg event.
- In 2022, Alina became a bronze medalist of 2022 European Cadets Wrestling Championships, held in Bucharest, in 57 kg event.
- In 2023, Alina received gold medals at the 2023 World Junior Wrestling Championships in Amman and at the 2023 European Juniors Wrestling Championships in Santiago de Compostela in 57 kg event.
- At the 2024 European Wrestling Championships, Alina won a silver medal in 59 kg event, losing Alyona Kolesnik, Ukrainian wrestler who represents Azerbaijan, in final match. She also won a gold medal at the 2024 Grand Prix Zagreb Open in 59 kg event.
