= Vahe Hovhannisyan =

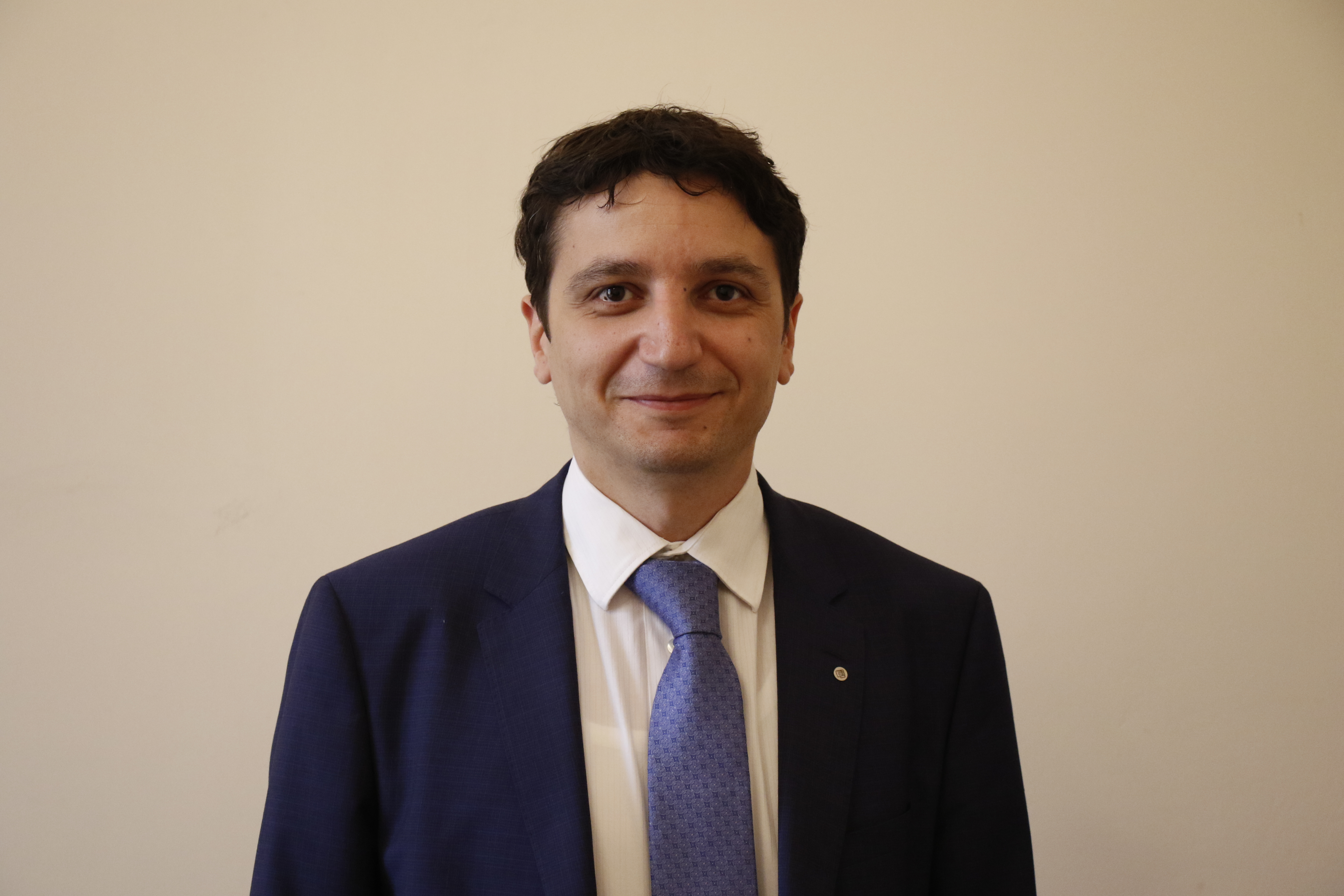
Official portrait.

Vahe Mishai Hovhannisyan (Armenian: Վահե Միշայի Հովհաննիսյան; born March 19, 1980, in Yerevan, Armenian SSR, USSR) is Armenian economist, politician and the current minister of finance of Armenia.

== Career ==
In 2000, he graduated from the General Economics Program of the Faculty of Economics of Yerevan State University and received the qualification of an economist. From 2015 to 2020, he worked at the Asian Development Bank as an independent expert in public finance and program coordination. In 2018–2019, he was an advisor to Prime Minister of Armenia Nikol Pashinyan on a non-profit basis.

From 2020 to 2021, he was an advisor to the director and member of the board of directors of the Asian Development Bank. In 2021–2022, he held the position of Deputy Minister of Finance of the Republic of Armenia. On December 20, 2022, he was appointed minister of finance by President Vahagn Khachaturyan, succeeding Tigran Khachatryan.

== Personal life ==
He was born on March 19, 1980, in Yerevan. Since 2015, he has been a member of the Civil Contract party, and since 2016, he has been the vice chairman of the party's supervisory committee. He served in the Armed Forces of Armenia from 2000 to 2002. He is married and has five children. He is fluent in English and Russian.
