= 2023 European U20 Wrestling Championships =

2023 European Juniors Championships
- Host city: Santiago de Compostela, Spain
- Dates: 26 June – 2 July 2023
- Stadium: Pavillón Multiusos Fontes do Sar

Champions
- Freestyle: Azerbaijan
- Greco-Roman: Azerbaijan
- Women: Ukraine

The 2023 European Juniors Wrestling Championships held in Santiago de Compostela, Spain between 26 June to 2 July 2023.

== Medal table ==
* Host nation (Spain)

Rank	Nation	Gold	Silver	Bronze	Total
1	Ukraine	8	1	8	17
2	Azerbaijan	4	4	7	15
2	Turkey	4	4	7	15
4	Georgia	4	3	3	10
5	Hungary	3	2	3	8
6	Armenia	2	5	4	11
7	Germany	1	3	5	9
8	Moldova	1	3	2	6
9	France	1	1	2	4
10	Sweden	1	0	2	3
11	Italy	1	0	1	2
12	Poland	0	2	2	4
13	Romania	0	1	4	5
14	Switzerland	0	1	0	1
15	Bulgaria	0	0	2	2
16	Czech Republic	0	0	1	1
16	Estonia	0	0	1	1
16	Greece	0	0	1	1
16	Israel	0	0	1	1
16	Lithuania	0	0	1	1
16	Netherlands	0	0	1	1
16	Serbia	0	0	1	1
16	Slovakia	0	0	1	1
Totals (23 entries)		30	30	60	120

== Team ranking ==
Rank	Men's freestyle		Men's Greco-Roman		Women's freestyle	
Rank	Team	Points	Team	Points	Team	Points
1	Azerbaijan	143	Azerbaijan	144	Ukraine	190
2	Turkey	142	Georgia	134	Hungary	128
3	Armenia	125	Turkey	113	Turkey	126
4	Ukraine	116	Armenia	107	Poland	98
5	Georgia	111	Ukraine	100	Germany	91
6	Germany	103	Moldova	93	Azerbaijan	70
7	France	61	Sweden	72	Romania	60
8	Hungary	49	Hungary	63	Bulgaria	47
9	Bulgaria	45	Germany	44	Switzerland	40
10	Moldova	43	Poland	30	France	40

== Medal overview ==
=== Men's freestyle ===
Event	Gold	Silver	Bronze
57 kg	Ruslan Abdullayev; Azerbaijan	Anton Vlas; Moldova	Tolga Özbek; Turkey
57 kg	Ruslan Abdullayev; Azerbaijan	Anton Vlas; Moldova	David Kiefer; Germany
61 kg	Jeyhun Allahverdiyev; Azerbaijan	Levik Mikayelyan; Armenia	Benjamin Boejthe; Romania
61 kg	Jeyhun Allahverdiyev; Azerbaijan	Levik Mikayelyan; Armenia	Zoltán Mizsei; Hungary
65 kg	Mykyta Zubal; Ukraine	Goga Otinashvili; Georgia	Seyfulla Itaev; France
65 kg	Mykyta Zubal; Ukraine	Goga Otinashvili; Georgia	Andranik Avetisyan; Armenia
70 kg	Metehan Yaprak; Turkey	Saba Kobakhidze; Georgia	Javidan Ahmadov; Azerbaijan
70 kg	Metehan Yaprak; Turkey	Saba Kobakhidze; Georgia	Ion Marcu; Moldova
74 kg	Stas David Wolf; Germany	Hayk Papikyan; Armenia	Muhammed Ozmuş; Turkey
74 kg	Stas David Wolf; Germany	Hayk Papikyan; Armenia	Raul Caso; Italy
79 kg	Otari Adeishvili; Georgia	Gregor Eigenbrodt; Germany	Sadig Mustafazade; Azerbaijan
79 kg	Otari Adeishvili; Georgia	Gregor Eigenbrodt; Germany	Narek Grigoryan; Armenia
86 kg	Rakhim Magamadov; France	Mushegh Mkrtchyan; Armenia	Ivan Chornohuz; Ukraine
86 kg	Rakhim Magamadov; France	Mushegh Mkrtchyan; Armenia	Tornike Samkharadze; Georgia
92 kg	Knyaz Iboyan; Armenia	Muhammed Gimri; Turkey	Sali Saliev; Bulgaria
92 kg	Knyaz Iboyan; Armenia	Muhammed Gimri; Turkey	Daniel Fischer; Germany
97 kg	Ivan Prymachenko; Ukraine	Doğan Uzun; Turkey	Zafar Aliyev; Azerbaijan
97 kg	Ivan Prymachenko; Ukraine	Doğan Uzun; Turkey	Nika Pantsulaia; Georgia
125 kg	Hakan Büyükçıngıl; Turkey	Yusif Dursunov; Azerbaijan	Volodymyr Kochanov; Ukraine
125 kg	Hakan Büyükçıngıl; Turkey	Yusif Dursunov; Azerbaijan	Levan Lagvilava; France

=== Men's Greco-Roman ===
Event	Gold	Silver	Bronze
55 kg	Elmir Aliyev; Azerbaijan	Marko Voloshyn; Ukraine	Homeros Arakelyan; Armenia
55 kg	Elmir Aliyev; Azerbaijan	Marko Voloshyn; Ukraine	Lukas Benzing; Germany
60 kg	Anri Khozrevanidze; Georgia	Suren Aghajanyan; Armenia	Kemal Sevgili; Turkey
60 kg	Anri Khozrevanidze; Georgia	Suren Aghajanyan; Armenia	Melkamu Fetene; Israel
63 kg	Yurik Hoveyan; Armenia	Vitalie Eriomenco; Moldova	Faraim Mustafayev; Azerbaijan
63 kg	Yurik Hoveyan; Armenia	Vitalie Eriomenco; Moldova	Bredi Slinkers; Netherlands
67 kg	Azat Sarıyar; Turkey	Nika Broladze; Georgia	Gaspar Terteryan; Armenia
67 kg	Azat Sarıyar; Turkey	Nika Broladze; Georgia	Kenan Abdullazade; Azerbaijan
72 kg	Ruslan Nurullayev; Azerbaijan	Levente Lévai; Hungary	Rokas Čepauskas; Lithuania
72 kg	Ruslan Nurullayev; Azerbaijan	Levente Lévai; Hungary	Irfan Mirzoiev; Ukraine
77 kg	Alexandru Solovei; Moldova	Davud Mammadov; Azerbaijan	Ruslan Abdiiev; Ukraine
77 kg	Alexandru Solovei; Moldova	Davud Mammadov; Azerbaijan	Michal Zelenka; Czech Republic
82 kg	Alexander Johansson; Sweden	Alperen Berber; Turkey	Data Chkhaidze; Georgia
82 kg	Alexander Johansson; Sweden	Alperen Berber; Turkey	Ivan Chmyr; Ukraine
87 kg	Achiko Bolkvadze; Georgia	Vigen Nazaryan; Armenia	Patrik Gordan; Romania
87 kg	Achiko Bolkvadze; Georgia	Vigen Nazaryan; Armenia	Hamza Sertcanli; Sweden
97 kg	Gor Ayvazyan; Georgia	Rostislav Covali; Moldova	Darius Kiefer; Germany
97 kg	Gor Ayvazyan; Georgia	Rostislav Covali; Moldova	Vladyslav Lub; Ukraine
130 kg	László Darabos; Hungary	Mazaim Mardanov; Azerbaijan	Eerik Pank; Estonia
130 kg	László Darabos; Hungary	Mazaim Mardanov; Azerbaijan	Talip Çiftçi; Turkey

=== Women's freestyle ===
Event	Gold	Silver	Bronze
50 kg	Viktoriia Slobodeniuk; Ukraine	Zerda Demir; Turkey	Asmar Jankurtaran; Azerbaijan
50 kg	Viktoriia Slobodeniuk; Ukraine	Zerda Demir; Turkey	Georgiana Antuca; Romania
53 kg	Mariia Yefremova; Ukraine	Gultakin Shirinova; Azerbaijan	Khrystyna Basych; Slovakia
53 kg	Mariia Yefremova; Ukraine	Gultakin Shirinova; Azerbaijan	Amory Andrich; Germany
55 kg	Tuba Demir; Turkey	Georgiana Lircă; Romania	Róza Szenttamási; Hungary
55 kg	Tuba Demir; Turkey	Georgiana Lircă; Romania	Ruzanna Mammadova; Azerbaijan
57 kg	Alina Filipovych; Ukraine	Gerda Terék; Hungary	Şevval Çayır; Turkey
57 kg	Alina Filipovych; Ukraine	Gerda Terék; Hungary	Patrycja Strzelczyk; Poland
59 kg	Aurora Russo; Italy	Annatina Lippuner; Switzerland	Sevim Akbaş; Turkey
59 kg	Aurora Russo; Italy	Annatina Lippuner; Switzerland	Yuliia Pakhniuk; Ukraine
62 kg	Iryna Bondar; Ukraine	Iris Thiébaux; France	Selvi İlyasoğlu; Turkey
62 kg	Iryna Bondar; Ukraine	Iris Thiébaux; France	Hedda Förare Berg; Sweden
65 kg	Enikő Elekes; Hungary	Alicja Nowosad; Poland	Maria Panțîru; Romania
65 kg	Enikő Elekes; Hungary	Alicja Nowosad; Poland	Maša Perović; Serbia
68 kg	Manola Skobelska; Ukraine	Sophia Schäfle; Germany	Nikoleta Barmpa; Greece
68 kg	Manola Skobelska; Ukraine	Sophia Schäfle; Germany	Luciana Beda; Moldova
72 kg	Iryna Zablotska; Ukraine	Patrycja Cuber; Poland	Noémi Osváth-Nagy; Hungary
72 kg	Iryna Zablotska; Ukraine	Patrycja Cuber; Poland	Vanesa Georgieva; Bulgaria
76 kg	Veronika Nyikos; Hungary	Laura Kühn; Germany	Mariia Zenkina; Ukraine
76 kg	Veronika Nyikos; Hungary	Laura Kühn; Germany	Daniela Tkachuk; Poland

== Participating nations ==
443 wrestlers from 34 countries:

1. Armenia (19)
2. Austria (7)
3. Azerbaijan (27)
4. Belgium (4)
5. Bulgaria (29)
6. Croatia (8)
7. Czech Republic (9)
8. Denmark (1)
9. Spain (15)
10. Estonia (8)
11. Finland (9)
12. France (15)
13. United Kingdom (2)
14. Georgia (20)
15. Germany (26)
16. Greece (13)
17. Hungary (26)
18. Israel (9)
19. Italy (11)
20. Latvia (3)
21. Lithuania (13)
22. Moldova (23)
23. North Macedonia (5)
24. Netherlands (2)
25. Norway (3)
26. Poland (28)
27. Portugal (1)
28. Romania (15)
29. Serbia (10)
30. Switzerland (7)
31. Slovakia (8)
32. Sweden (11)
33. Turkey (30)
34. Ukraine (30)
