= 2024 U20 World Wrestling Championships – Men's freestyle =

The Men's freestyle competitions at the 2024 U20 World Wrestling Championships were held in Pontevedra, Spain between 6 and 8 September 2024.

== Men's freestyle ==
=== 57 kg ===
6 and 7 September

Legend

- F — Won by fall
- WO — Won by walkover

Final

Final
Lev Pavlov (AIN)	1
Luke Lilledahl (USA)	2

Top half

Round of 32
Caio Aron (BRA)	14
Bashir Verdiyev (AZE)	3

Round of 16
Myktybek Ukimetuly (KAZ)	9
Baiaman Kerimbekov (KGZ)	1
Caio Aron (BRA)	0
Lev Pavlov (AIN)	3
Leon Diogo Fernandes Zinser (GER)	10
Alessandro Iemma (ESP)	0
Luka Gvinjilia (GEO)	10
Marcel Andronache (MDA)	0

Quarterfinals
Myktybek Ukimetuly (KAZ)	0
Lev Pavlov (AIN)	6
Leon Diogo Fernandes Zinser (GER)	0
Luka Gvinjilia (GEO)	10

Semifinals
Lev Pavlov (AIN)	5
Luka Gvinjilia (GEO)	2

Bottom half

Round of 32
Herbert Akapian (AIN)	0
Ankush Chandram (IND)	10^{F}
Hayko Gasparyan (ARM)	12
Artem Martiushev (UKR)	1

Round of 16
Luke Lilledahl (USA)	10
Käbe Mätjanow (TKM)	0
Ankush Chandram (IND)	5
Shotaro Matsumura (JPN)	0
Rassoul Galbouraev (FRA)	0
Hayko Gasparyan (ARM)	10
Bekir Keser (TUR)	1
Milad Valizadeh (IRI)	11

Quarterfinals
Luke Lilledahl (USA)	4
Ankush Chandram (IND)	3
Hayko Gasparyan (ARM)	10
Milad Valizadeh (IRI)	0

Semifinals
Luke Lilledahl (USA)	4
Hayko Gasparyan (ARM)	1

Repechage round 2
Caio Aron (BRA)	2
Myktybek Ukimetuly (KAZ)	7
~~Käbe Mätjanow (TKM)~~
Ankush Chandram (IND)	WO

Bronze medals
Myktybek Ukimetuly (KAZ)	1
Luka Gvinjilia (GEO)	4
Ankush Chandram (IND)	6
Hayko Gasparyan (ARM)	2

=== 61 kg ===
7 and 8 September

Legend

- F — Won by fall

Final

Final
Ebrahim Khari (IRI)	0
Masanosuke Ono (JPN)	10

Top half

Round of 32
Abdelrahman Mahmoud (EGY)	5
Marc Arias (ESP)	1
Edik Harutyunyan (ARM)	6^{F}
Vasili Lazarev (MDA)	0
Róbert Meszároš (SVK)	11^{F}
Blayne Helou (CAN)	0
Ebrahim Khari (IRI)	10
Jacob Brunner (PUR)	0

Round of 16
Abdinur Nurlanbek (KAZ)	2^{F}
Abdelrahman Mahmoud (EGY)	1
Edik Harutyunyan (ARM)	10
Viktor Borohan (UKR)	0
Sandro Hungerbühler (SUI)	3
Róbert Meszároš (SVK)	1
Ebrahim Khari (IRI)	10
Bhuvanesh (IND)	0

Quarterfinals
Abdinur Nurlanbek (KAZ)	6
Edik Harutyunyan (ARM)	0
Sandro Hungerbühler (SUI)	0
Ebrahim Khari (IRI)	10

Semifinals
Abdinur Nurlanbek (KAZ)	4
Ebrahim Khari (IRI)	6

Bottom half

Round of 32
Marcus Blaze (USA)	4^{F}
Kim Do-hyung (KOR)	0
Jamal Abbasov (AZE)	10
Dengburile (CHN)	0
Danny Lubrano (ITA)	4
Tornike Asabashvili (GEO)	9
Andrei Midlovets (AIN)	6
Azat Sharshenaliev (KGZ)	1

Round of 16
Amir Hamaýun (TKM)	1
Marcus Blaze (USA)	11
Jamal Abbasov (AZE)	10
Benjamin Zuckerman (BRA)	0
Tolga Özbek (TUR)	13
Tornike Asabashvili (GEO)	2
Andrei Midlovets (AIN)	0
Masanosuke Ono (JPN)	10

Quarterfinals
Marcus Blaze (USA)	7
Jamal Abbasov (AZE)	1
Tolga Özbek (TUR)	0
Masanosuke Ono (JPN)	11

Semifinals
Marcus Blaze (USA)	2
Masanosuke Ono (JPN)	7

Repechage round 1
Jacob Brunner (PUR)	0
Bhuvanesh (IND)	10

Repechage round 2
Bhuvanesh (IND)	13^{F}
Sandro Hungerbühler (SUI)	2
Andrei Midlovets (AIN)	2
Tolga Özbek (TUR)	4

Bronze medals
Bhuvanesh (IND)	6
Abdinur Nurlanbek (KAZ)	5
Tolga Özbek (TUR)	0
Marcus Blaze (USA)	5

=== 65 kg ===
6 and 7 September

Legend

- F — Won by fall

Final

Final
Makoto Hosokawa (JPN)	2
Ali Khorramdel (IRI)	10

Top half

Round of 32
Luca Hartmann (AUT)	0
Makoto Hosokawa (JPN)	11
Ion Berghi (MDA)	10
Wang Xin (CHN)	0
Felipe Ferrusola (ESP)	10
Diego Peraza (MEX)	0
Bo Bassett (USA)	19
Valentyn Hryhoryshyn (UKR)	8
Nikhil Pilanagoila (IND)	12
Shattyk Alaidar (KAZ)	11

Round of 16
Nikoloz Beshidze (GEO)	6
Makoto Hosokawa (JPN)	11^{F}
Ion Berghi (MDA)	8
Felipe Ferrusola (ESP)	4
Dzmitry Shvarts (AIN)	0
Bo Bassett (USA)	7^{F}
Nikhil Pilanagoila (IND)	9
Dominik Jagusz (POL)	2

Quarterfinals
Makoto Hosokawa (JPN)	10
Ion Berghi (MDA)	0
Bo Bassett (USA)	6^{F}
Nikhil Pilanagoila (IND)	4

Semifinals
Makoto Hosokawa (JPN)	10
Bo Bassett (USA)	0

Bottom half

Round of 32
Zalkarbek Tabaldiev (KGZ)	2
Adam Arkhiev (AIN)	3
Khizir Dasiyev (FRA)	10
Kaige Brown (NZL)	0
Zoltán Mizsei (HUN)	0
Abdullah Toprak (TUR)	11
Marian Sandu (ROU)	2
Aykhan Abdullazada (AZE)	12

Round of 16
Alessandro Nini (ITA)	1
Adam Arkhiev (AIN)	9
Khizir Dasiyev (FRA)	8
Rafael García (PUR)	4
Ali Khorramdel (IRI)	12
Abdullah Toprak (TUR)	11
Aykhan Abdullazada (AZE)	12
Arman Musikyan (ARM)	8

Quarterfinals
Adam Arkhiev (AIN)	11^{F}
Khizir Dasiyev (FRA)	2
Ali Khorramdel (IRI)	9
Aykhan Abdullazada (AZE)	6

Semifinals
Adam Arkhiev (AIN)	4
Ali Khorramdel (IRI)	6

Repechage round 1
Luca Hartmann (AUT)	0
Nikoloz Beshidze (GEO)	11

Repechage round 2
Nikoloz Beshidze (GEO)	6
Ion Berghi (MDA)	3
Abdullah Toprak (TUR)	6
Aykhan Abdullazada (AZE)	5

Bronze medal match
Nikoloz Beshidze (GEO)	0
Bo Bassett (USA)	10
Abdullah Toprak (TUR)	1
Adam Arkhiev (AIN)	4

=== 70 kg ===
6 and 7 September

Legend

- F — Won by fall

Final

Final
Ryoya Yamashita (JPN)	6
Magomed Baitukaev (AIN)	0

Top half

Round of 32
Alexandr Gaidarli (MDA)	4
Ali Karampour (IRI)	15
Ramik Heybatov (AZE)	2
Bohdan Oliinyk (UKR)	3
Aliaksandr Kambayeu (AIN)	1
Alexander Seiwald (AUT)	12
Ryoya Yamashita (JPN)	10
Nilesh Nadiparwale (IND)	0
Gabriel Sánchez (MEX)	5
Daniele Gubbiotti (ITA)	7
Omar Mourad (EGY)	6
Goga Otinashvili (GEO)	10

Round of 16
Georgios Ioakeimidis (GRE)	2
Ali Karampour (IRI)	12
Bohdan Oliinyk (UKR)	11
Alexander Seiwald (AUT)	0
Ryoya Yamashita (JPN)	15
Daniele Gubbiotti (ITA)	2
Goga Otinashvili (GEO)	10
Umut Erdoğan (TUR)	7

Quarterfinals
Ali Karampour (IRI)	10
Bohdan Oliinyk (UKR)	0
Ryoya Yamashita (JPN)	6
Goga Otinashvili (GEO)	3

Semifinals
Ali Karampour (IRI)	2
Ryoya Yamashita (JPN)	13

Bottom half

Round of 32
Denis Kodakov (ESP)	0
Aikyn Bolatuly (KAZ)	10
Magomed Baitukaev (AIN)	11
Abderrahmane Benhamadi (ALG)	0
Lin Youhua (CHN)	4
Vladimir Azaryan (ARM)	9
Rostislav Leicht (GER)	2
Aden Sakybaev (KGZ)	6
Zelimkhan Mutsukhaev (POL)	0
PJ Duke (USA)	10
Altangereliin Ankh-Erdene (MGL)	10^{F}
Sehajpal Sidhu (CAN)	4

Round of 16
Daniel Korkin (ISR)	0
Aikyn Bolatuly (KAZ)	10
Magomed Baitukaev (AIN)	9
Vladimir Azaryan (ARM)	1
Aden Sakybaev (KGZ)	0
PJ Duke (USA)	10
Altangereliin Ankh-Erdene (MGL)	13
Alex Gombos (HUN)	2

Quarterfinals
Aikyn Bolatuly (KAZ)	0
Magomed Baitukaev (AIN)	10
PJ Duke (USA)	12
Altangereliin Ankh-Erdene (MGL)	1

Semifinals
Magomed Baitukaev (AIN)	5
PJ Duke (USA)	5

Repechage round 1
Nilesh Nadiparwale (IND)	6
Daniele Gubbiotti (ITA)	2
Abderrahmane Benhamadi (ALG)	0
Vladimir Azaryan (ARM)	11

Repechage round 2
Nilesh Nadiparwale (IND)	1
Goga Otinashvili (GEO)	11
Vladimir Azaryan (ARM)	1
Aikyn Bolatuly (KAZ)	8

Bronze medal match
Goga Otinashvili (GEO)	4
Ali Karampour (IRI)	9^{F}
Aikyn Bolatuly (KAZ)	7
PJ Duke (USA)	18

=== 74 kg ===
7 and 8 September

Legend

- F — Won by fall
- WO — Won by walkover

Final

Final
Ladarion Lockett (USA)	3
Ali Rezaei (IRI)	3

Top half

Round of 32
Gaurav (IND)	8
Lin Yi-jie (TPE)	4
Baitemir Tuleberdiev (KGZ)	2
Ladarion Lockett (USA)	10^{F}
Mönkhbatyn Tolui (MGL)	0
Tamir Eshinimaev (AIN)	7
Seyfulla Itaev (FRA)	6
Aghanazar Novruzov (AZE)	7
Egzon Xhoni (KOS)	0
Wang Ning (CHN)	10
Nikolai Tarassov (EST)	0
Yegor Anchugin (KAZ)	10
Fabricio Reyes (ESP)	3
Samvel Gevorgyan (ARM)	5

Round of 16
Antoni Majchrzak (POL)	0
Gaurav (IND)	11
Ladarion Lockett (USA)	6
Tamir Eshinimaev (AIN)	0
Aghanazar Novruzov (AZE)	8
Wang Ning (CHN)	2
Yegor Anchugin (KAZ)	5
Samvel Gevorgyan (ARM)	1

Quarterfinals
Gaurav (IND)	0
Ladarion Lockett (USA)	11
Aghanazar Novruzov (AZE)	7
Yegor Anchugin (KAZ)	3

Semifinals
Ladarion Lockett (USA)	3
Aghanazar Novruzov (AZE)	1

Bottom half

Qualification
Rostyslav Prus (UKR)	10
Khaled Mohamed (EGY)	0
Ion Marcu (MDA)	4
Raul Caso (ITA)	4
Metehan Yaprak (TUR)	10
Nicholas Hooper (CAN)	0
Shingo Ando (JPN)	9
Theocharis Kougioumtsidis (GRE)	0
Muhamed Bektemirov (AUT)	10
Trent Jaeggi (AUS)	0
Giorgi Rigvava (GEO)	6
Muslim Makhmudau (AIN)	4
Ali Rezaei (IRI)	10
Paulo Gonçalves (BRA)	0

Round of 16
Rostyslav Prus (UKR)	5
Ion Marcu (MDA)	7
Metehan Yaprak (TUR)	1
Shingo Ando (JPN)	3
Muhamed Bektemirov (AUT)	9
Giorgi Rigvava (GEO)	8
Ali Rezaei (IRI)	12
Marian Subțirică (ROU)	1

Quarterfinals
Ion Marcu (MDA)	1
Shingo Ando (JPN)	3
Muhamed Bektemirov (AUT)	10
Ali Rezaei (IRI)	17

Semifinals
Shingo Ando (JPN)	0
Ali Rezaei (IRI)	10

Repechage round 1
Baitemir Tuleberdiev (KGZ)	5
Tamir Eshinimaev (AIN)	6
Paulo Gonçalves (BRA)
Marian Subțirică (ROU)	WO

Repechage round 2
Tamir Eshinimaev (AIN)	3
Gaurav (IND)	1
Marian Subțirică (ROU)	3
Muhamed Bektemirov (AUT)	5

Bronze medal match
Tamir Eshinimaev (AIN)	1
Aghanazar Novruzov (AZE)	4
Muhamed Bektemirov (AUT)	3
Shingo Ando (JPN)	9

=== 79 kg ===
6 and 7 September

Legend

- F — Won by fall
- WO — Won by walkover

Final

Final
Zack Ryder (USA)	0
Alp Arslan Begenjow (TKM)	5

Top half

Round of 32
Kevin Olavarría (PUR)	0
Giorgi Gogritchiani (GEO)	10
Adam Kakhriev (FRA)	0
Gregor Eigenbrodt (GER)	8
Bartłomiej Nowakowski (POL)	7
Aren Israyelyan (ARM)	9
Zack Ryder (USA)	10
Li Jinju (CHN)	0
Bogdan Djandigov (BEL)	3
Paulius Leščauskas (LTU)	4

Round of 16
Said Saidulov (AIN)	12
Giorgi Gogritchiani (GEO)	2
Gregor Eigenbrodt (GER)	0
Aren Israyelyan (ARM)	2
Leandro Araújo (BRA)	0
Zack Ryder (USA)	11
Paulius Leščauskas (LTU)	9^{F}
Moisés Bello (ESP)	0

Quarterfinals
Said Saidulov (AIN)	2
Aren Israyelyan (ARM)	1
Zack Ryder (USA)	11
Paulius Leščauskas (LTU)	0

Semifinals
Said Saidulov (AIN)	3
Zack Ryder (USA)	6

Bottom half

Qualification
Emin Gojayev (AZE)	15
Adilet Akylbekov (KGZ)	8
Oleksandr Mamrosh (UKR)	11
Jang You-min (KOR)	0
Alp Arslan Begenjow (TKM)	10
Mehdi Yousefi (IRI)	0
Amit (IND)	WO
~~Mukhammad Inshapiev (AUT)~~
Bekir Öveç (TUR)	2
Ryunosuke Kamiya (JPN)	5
Ion Laurențiu Marcu (MDA)	4
Radomir Stoyanov (BUL)	5

Round of 16
Dzmitry Lukashuk (AIN)	3
Emin Gojayev (AZE)	1
Oleksandr Mamrosh (UKR)	0
Alp Arslan Begenjow (TKM)	10
Amit (IND)	4
Ryunosuke Kamiya (JPN)	3
Radomir Stoyanov (BUL)	0
Yerkhan Bexultanov (KAZ)	5

Quarterfinals
Dzmitry Lukashuk (AIN)	0
Alp Arslan Begenjow (TKM)	10
Amit (IND)	13
Yerkhan Bexultanov (KAZ)	6

Semifinals
Alp Arslan Begenjow (TKM)	11^{F}
Amit (IND)	0

Repechage round 1
Li Jinju (CHN)	0
Leandro Araújo (BRA)	11
Mehdi Yousefi (IRI)	10
Oleksandr Mamrosh (UKR)	0

Repechage round 2
Leandro Araújo (BRA)	14
Paulius Leščauskas (LTU)	4
Mehdi Yousefi (IRI)	11^{F}
Dzmitry Lukashuk (AIN)	0

Bronze medal match
Leandro Araújo (BRA)	5
Said Saidulov (AIN)	4
Mehdi Yousefi (IRI)	13
Amit (IND)	2

=== 86 kg ===
7 and 8 September

Final

Final
Josh Barr (USA)	2
Ibragim Kadiev (AIN)	8

Top half

Round of 32
Tornike Samkharadze (GEO)	2
Ahmet Yağan (TUR)	12
Alexandru Borș (MDA)	2
Sadig Mustafazade (AZE)	2
Azael García (ESP)	0
Sachin (IND)	5
Aliaksei Kulakou (AIN)	11
Vladislav Rjabtsev (EST)	0

Round of 16
Navruz Akhmedkhanov (KAZ)	3
Ahmet Yağan (TUR)	4
Alexandru Borș (MDA)	2
Mohammad Umkhadjiev (FRA)	1
Josh Barr (USA)	10
Sachin (IND)	0
Aliaksei Kulakou (AIN)	7
Ryogo Asano (JPN)	8

Quarterfinals
Ahmet Yağan (TUR)	3
Alexandru Borș (MDA)	1
Josh Barr (USA)	10
Ryogo Asano (JPN)	0

Semifinals
Ahmet Yağan (TUR)	0
Josh Barr (USA)	10

Bottom half

Round of 32
Péter Zsivnovszki (HUN)	0
Abolfazl Rahmani (IRI)	10
Naadambatyn Batbilgüün (MGL)	11
Illia Plakhtyr (UKR)	0
Gabriele Niccolini (ITA)	13
Matteo Monteiro (CPV)	8
Rohit Bal (CAN)	6
Akhmat Zhappuev (KGZ)	9

Round of 16
Hwang Ho-yeon (KOR)	0
Abolfazl Rahmani (IRI)	9
Naadambatyn Batbilgüün (MGL)	13
Döwletgeldi Myradow (TKM)	2
Wang Pengcheng (CHN)	2
Gabriele Niccolini (ITA)	4
Akhmat Zhappuev (KGZ)	0
Ibragim Kadiev (AIN)	12

Quarterfinals
Abolfazl Rahmani (IRI)	13
Naadambatyn Batbilgüün (MGL)	6
Gabriele Niccolini (ITA)	0
Ibragim Kadiev (AIN)	10

Semifinals
Abolfazl Rahmani (IRI)	2
Ibragim Kadiev (AIN)	12

Repechage round 2
Sachin (IND)	4
Ryogo Asano (JPN)	6
Akhmat Zhappuev (KGZ)	0
Gabriele Niccolini (ITA)	10

Bronze medals
Ryogo Asano (JPN)	2
Ahmet Yağan (TUR)	3
Gabriele Niccolini (ITA)	2
Abolfazl Rahmani (IRI)	6

=== 92 kg ===
7 and 8 September

Legend

- F — Won by fall

Final

Final
Mustafagadzhi Malachdibirov (AIN)	11
Sali Saliev (BUL)	0

Top half

Qualification
Konstantine Petriashvili (GEO)	11
Grigoris Saridis (GRE)	1
Musza Arsunkaev (HUN)	0
Mustafagadzhi Malachdibirov (AIN)	10
Amir Reza Daliri (IRI)	10
Vadzim Bandarkou (AIN)	0

Round of 16
Fatih Altunbaş (TUR)	11
Sorato Kanazawa (JPN)	4
Konstantine Petriashvili (GEO)	6
Kamil Kurugliyev (KAZ)	7
Dembereliin Delgerdalai (MGL)	0
Mustafagadzhi Malachdibirov (AIN)	10
Amir Reza Daliri (IRI)	14
Qiu Kai (CHN)	4

Quarterfinals
Fatih Altunbaş (TUR)	2
Kamil Kurugliyev (KAZ)	5
Mustafagadzhi Malachdibirov (AIN)	13
Amir Reza Daliri (IRI)	3

Semifinals
Kamil Kurugliyev (KAZ)	0
Mustafagadzhi Malachdibirov (AIN)	5

Bottom half

Qualification
Cole Mirasola (USA)	10
Grigori Tomailî (MDA)	0
Oleh Kuzmenko-Taison (UKR)	10
Roberto Nsangua (ANG)	0
Nikita Goubarets (ISR)	2
David Jakšík (SVK)	2
Iakov Chaplin (KGZ)	1
Sali Saliev (BUL)	1

Round of 16
Soltan Begenjow (TKM)	4
Cole Mirasola (USA)	14
Oleh Kuzmenko-Taison (UKR)	11
Mykola Tolmachov (ESP)	0
Anar Jafarli (AZE)	10
Nikita Goubarets (ISR)	0
Sali Saliev (BUL)	4
Amit Singh (IND)	0

Quarterfinals
Cole Mirasola (USA)	9
Oleh Kuzmenko-Taison (UKR)	4
Anar Jafarli (AZE)	3
Sali Saliev (BUL)	5

Semifinals
Cole Mirasola (USA)	4
Sali Saliev (BUL)	5

Repechage round 1
Musza Arsunkaev (HUN)	10
Dembereliin Delgerdalai (MGL)	0
Iakov Chaplin (KGZ)	3
Amit Singh (IND)	5

Repechage round 2
Musza Arsunkaev (HUN)	0
Amir Reza Daliri (IRI)	7
Amit Singh (IND)	4
Anar Jafarli (AZE)	10^{F}

Bronze medal match
Amir Reza Daliri (IRI)	5
Kamil Kurugliyev (KAZ)	8
Anar Jafarli (AZE)	6
Cole Mirasola (USA)	2

=== 97 kg ===
6 and 7 September

Legend

- F — Won by fall

Final

Final
Rizabek Aitmukhan (KAZ)	10
Khetag Karsanov (AZE)	0

Top half

Round of 32
Shakhman Nukhaev (AIN)	0
Justin Rademacher (USA)	8

Round of 16
Bence Veress (HUN)	0
Ramini Gulitashvili (GEO)	10
Justin Rademacher (USA)	10
Genki Hoki (TUR)	0
Kostiantyn Zadoianchuk (UKR)	0
Nikolaos Karavanos (GRE)	2^{F}
Abolfazl Babaloo (IRI)	1
Rizabek Aitmukhan (KAZ)	12

Quarterfinals
Ramini Gulitashvili (GEO)	0
Justin Rademacher (USA)	4
Nikolaos Karavanos (GRE)	1
Rizabek Aitmukhan (KAZ)	12

Semifinals
Justin Rademacher (USA)	1
Rizabek Aitmukhan (KAZ)	9

Bottom half

Round of 32
Tejvir Dhinsa (CAN)	0
Rıfat Gıdak (TUR)	4^{F}
Tuxige (CHN)	12^{F}
Miles Daly (AUS)	0

Round of 16
Khetag Karsanov (AZE)	11
Aitenir Maksatov (KGZ)	0
Rıfat Gıdak (TUR)	4
Sahil Jaglan (IND)	2
Enrique Jiménez (ESP)	0
Tuxige (CHN)	8^{F}
Adam Jakšík (SVK)	11
Constantin Buza (MDA)	0

Quarterfinals
Khetag Karsanov (AZE)	2
Rıfat Gıdak (TUR)	1
Tuxige (CHN)	0
Adam Jakšík (SVK)	4^{F}

Semifinals
Khetag Karsanov (AZE)	5^{F}
Adam Jakšík (SVK)	0

Repechage round 2
Abolfazl Babaloo (IRI)	4
Nikolaos Karavanos (GRE)	4^{F}
Aitenir Maksatov (KGZ)	0
Rıfat Gıdak (TUR)	3

Bronze medals
Nikolaos Karavanos (GRE)	0
Justin Rademacher (USA)	10
Rıfat Gıdak (TUR)	1
Adam Jakšík (SVK)	2

=== 125 kg ===
7 and 8 September

Legend

- F — Won by fall

Final

Final
Ben Kueter (USA)	2
Amir Reza Masoumi (IRI)	4

Top half

Round of 32
Ralfs Lukins (LAT)	4
Zhuang Yiwei (CHN)	14

Round of 16
Batbayaryn Nambardagva (MGL)	4
Hosei Fujitai (JPN)	0
Zhuang Yiwei (CHN)	21
Jang Bae-joon (KOR)	14
Alikhan Kussainov (KAZ)	0
Ben Kueter (USA)	7
Stsiapan Mandryk (AIN)	5
Nicolae Stratulat (MDA)	1

Quarterfinals
Batbayaryn Nambardagva (MGL)	8^{F}
Zhuang Yiwei (CHN)	0
Ben Kueter (USA)	4^{F}
Stsiapan Mandryk (AIN)	0

Semifinals
Batbayaryn Nambardagva (MGL)	3
Ben Kueter (USA)	13

Bottom half

Round of 32
Aleksandre Abramishvili (GEO)	1
Yusif Dursunov (AZE)	8
Amir Reza Masoumi (IRI)	7
Jaspooran Singh (IND)	0

Round of 16
Khabib Davudgadzhiev (AIN)	3
Hakan Büyükçıngıl (TUR)	3
Yusif Dursunov (AZE)	3
Khachatur Khachatryan (ARM)	3
Omogbai Asekomhe (CAN)	0
Amir Reza Masoumi (IRI)	8
Ivan Myroshnychenko (UKR)	2^{F}
Ethan Vergara (PUR)	0

Quarterfinals
Hakan Büyükçıngıl (TUR)	9
Yusif Dursunov (AZE)	0
Amir Reza Masoumi (IRI)	10
Ivan Myroshnychenko (UKR)	0

Semifinals
Hakan Büyükçıngıl (TUR)	1
Amir Reza Masoumi (IRI)	3

Repechage round 1
Jaspooran Singh (IND)	11
Omogbai Asekomhe (CAN)	0

Repechage round 2
Alikhan Kussainov (KAZ)	8
Stsiapan Mandryk (AIN)	3
Jaspooran Singh (IND)	10
Ivan Myroshnychenko (UKR)	0

Bronze medals
Alikhan Kussainov (KAZ)	1
Batbayaryn Nambardagva (MGL)	4
Jaspooran Singh (IND)	2
Hakan Büyükçıngıl (TUR)	3

== See also ==
- 2024 U20 World Wrestling Championships – Men's Greco-Roman
- 2024 U20 World Wrestling Championships – Women's freestyle
