= 2025 U20 World Wrestling Championships – Men's freestyle =

The men's freestyle competitions at the 2025 U20 World Wrestling Championships were held in Samokov, Bulgaria between 17 and 20 August 2025.

== Men's freestyle ==
Legend

- C — Won by 3 cautions given to the opponent
- F — Won by fall
- R — Retired
- WO — Won by walkover

=== 57 kg ===
18 and 19 August

Final

Final
Magomed-Saliakh Ozdamirov (UWW)	8
Sumit Malik (IND)	5

Top half

Round of 32
Irie Jackson (JAM)	0
Baiaman Kerimbekov (KGZ)	11
Arshia Haddadi (IRI)	1
Magomed-Saliakh Ozdamirov (UWW)	6
Arman Harutyunyan (ARM)	5
Ben Hachem Tarik (MAR)	0
Mykola Bratov (UKR)	0
Anthony Knox (USA)	11

Round of 16
Herbert Akapian (UWW)	6
Baiaman Kerimbekov (KGZ)	7
Magomed-Saliakh Ozdamirov (UWW)	10
Esad Bozali (BUL)	0
Nika Zangaladze (GEO)	14
Arman Harutyunyan (ARM)	4
Anthony Knox (USA)	3
Nurdanat Aitanov (KAZ)	14

Quarterfinals
Baiaman Kerimbekov (KGZ)	1
Magomed-Saliakh Ozdamirov (UWW)	3
Nika Zangaladze (GEO)	2
Nurdanat Aitanov (KAZ)	5

Semifinals
Magomed-Saliakh Ozdamirov (UWW)	3
Nurdanat Aitanov (KAZ)	1

Bottom half

Round of 32
Wang Chengtao (CHN)	5
Caio Aron (BRA)	5
Sumit Malik (IND)	7
Ethan Rivera (PUR)	2
Nurettin Kapal (TUR)	0
Károly Baráth (HUN)	5^{F}
Bak In-seong (KOR)	0
Riccardo Bonanno (ITA)	13^{F}

Round of 16
Vasif Baghirov (AZE)	6
Caio Aron (BRA)	1
Sumit Malik (IND)	10
Rin Sakamoto (JPN)	10
Ion Bulgaru (MDA)	6
Károly Baráth (HUN)	0
Riccardo Bonanno (ITA)	12
Hayden Ancheta (PHI)	15

Quarterfinals
Vasif Baghirov (AZE)	2
Sumit Malik (IND)	9
Ion Bulgaru (MDA)	14
Hayden Ancheta (PHI)	3

Semifinals
Sumit Malik (IND)	11
Ion Bulgaru (MDA)	3

Repechage round 1
Arshia Haddadi (IRI)	10
Esad Bozali (BUL)	0
Ethan Rivera (PUR)	1
Rin Sakamoto (JPN)	6

Repechage round 2
Arshia Haddadi (IRI)	4
Baiaman Kerimbekov (KGZ)	5
Rin Sakamoto (JPN)	2
Vasif Baghirov (AZE)	10

Bronze medal match
Baiaman Kerimbekov (KGZ)	0
Nurdanat Aitanov (KAZ)	11
Vasif Baghirov (AZE)	8
Ion Bulgaru (MDA)	2

=== 61 kg ===
19 and 20 August

Final

Final
Marcus Blaze (USA)	10
Ahoura Khateri (IRI)	0

Top half

Round of 32
Takuto Osedo (JPN)	11
Erdal Galip (BUL)	0
Marcus Blaze (USA)	10
Sandro Hungerbühler (SUI)	0
Sargis Begoyan (ARM)	11
Hacı Zade (TUR)	0
Pasquale Liuzzi (ITA)	17
Vasili Lazarev (MDA)	6
Lu Anchao (CHN)	7
Ivan Oksiuk (POL)	8^{F}

Round of 16
Askat Toktomatov (KGZ)	10^{F}
Takuto Osedo (JPN)	1
Marcus Blaze (USA)	8^{C}
Sargis Begoyan (ARM)	3
Stefan Stojkov (MKD)	2
Pasquale Liuzzi (ITA)	12
Ivan Oksiuk (POL)
Magomedkhan Magamedkhanov (UWW)	WO

Quarterfinals
Askat Toktomatov (KGZ)	1
Marcus Blaze (USA)	11
Pasquale Liuzzi (ITA)	2
Magomedkhan Magamedkhanov (UWW)	9

Semifinals
Marcus Blaze (USA)	15
Magomedkhan Magamedkhanov (UWW)	4

Bottom half

Round of 32
Adlan Saitiev (UWW)	10
Danoush Jowkar (GBR)	1
Róbert Meszároš (SVK)	2
Ajay Kapade (IND)	12
Karson Brown (CAN)	10
Omar Ayoub (PUR)	14
Allan Oralbek (KAZ)	12
Saba Gambashidze (GEO)	2

Round of 16
Andrii Shokaliuk (UKR)	1
Adlan Saitiev (UWW)	4
Ajay Kapade (IND)	12
Abdulloh Khabibullayev (UZB)	2
Ahoura Khateri (IRI)	8
Omar Ayoub (PUR)	6
Allan Oralbek (KAZ)	11
Farhad Hajiyev (AZE)	0

Quarterfinals
Adlan Saitiev (UWW)	17
Ajay Kapade (IND)	9
Ahoura Khateri (IRI)	6
Allan Oralbek (KAZ)	5

Semifinals
Adlan Saitiev (UWW)	1
Ahoura Khateri (IRI)	3

Repechage round 1
Sandro Hungerbühler (SUI)	0
Sargis Begoyan (ARM)	10

Repechage round 2
Sargis Begoyan (ARM)	2^{F}
Askat Toktomatov (KGZ)	2
Omar Ayoub (PUR)	16
Allan Oralbek (KAZ)	9

Bronze medal match
Sargis Begoyan (ARM)	11
Magomedkhan Magamedkhanov (UWW)	12
Omar Ayoub (PUR)	8
Adlan Saitiev (UWW)	6

=== 65 kg ===
18 and 19 August

Final

Final
Luke Stanich (USA)	4
Reiji Uchida (JPN)	3

Top half

Round of 32
Luke Stanich (USA)	18
Abdullah Toprak (TUR)	8
Tövdöögiin Janchivdorj (MGL)	4
Alessandro Nini (ITA)	2^{F}
Janar Lips (EST)	0
Lazare Gujaraidze (GEO)	6^{F}
Šamilj Dadajev (SRB)	0
Ion Berghi (MDA)	4^{F}
Amal Dzhandubaev (UWW)	10
Agha Gasimov (AZE)	0

Round of 16
Omurbek Asan Uulu (KGZ)	3
Luke Stanich (USA)	9
Alessandro Nini (ITA)	12
Lazare Gujaraidze (GEO)	1
Yeraly Zhenissov (KAZ)	10
Ion Berghi (MDA)	0
Amal Dzhandubaev (UWW)	10
Ali Asghar Tat (IRI)	9

Quarterfinals
Luke Stanich (USA)	3
Alessandro Nini (ITA)	3
Yeraly Zhenissov (KAZ)	0
Amal Dzhandubaev (UWW)	6

Semifinals
Luke Stanich (USA)	3
Amal Dzhandubaev (UWW)	1

Bottom half

Round of 32
Khalin Radev (CAN)	0
Mózes László (HUN)	10
Viktor Borohan (UKR)	4
Ashwani (IND)	4
Kaige Brown (NZL)	0
Arman Musikyan (ARM)	10
Aik Kazarian (GRE)	2
Denis Naim (BUL)	3

Round of 16
Benjamin Boejthe (ROU)	10
Mózes László (HUN)	0
Viktor Borohan (UKR)	12
Gang Duxi (CHN)	1
Reiji Uchida (JPN)	5
Arman Musikyan (ARM)	2
Denis Naim (BUL)	0
Sanjarbek Rustambekov (UZB)	10

Quarterfinals
Benjamin Boejthe (ROU)	6
Viktor Borohan (UKR)	6
Reiji Uchida (JPN)	11
Sanjarbek Rustambekov (UZB)	0

Semifinals
Viktor Borohan (UKR)	0
Reiji Uchida (JPN)	10

Repechage round 1
Abdullah Toprak (TUR)	10
Omurbek Asan Uulu (KGZ)	0

Repechage round 2
Abdullah Toprak (TUR)	10
Alessandro Nini (ITA)	0
Arman Musikyan (ARM)	2
Sanjarbek Rustambekov (UZB)	2

Bronze medal match
Abdullah Toprak (TUR)	14
Amal Dzhandubaev (UWW)	10
Arman Musikyan (ARM)	4
Viktor Borohan (UKR)	0

=== 70 kg ===
17 and 18 August

Final

Final
PJ Duke (USA)	7
Alexandr Gaidarli (MDA)	5

Top half

Round of 32
Ebrahim Elahi (IRI)	6
Sagar (IND)	5
Daniele Gubbiotti (ITA)	1
Sungkar Seidakhmet (KAZ)	2
PJ Duke (USA)	11
Umut Uslu (TUR)	0
Oleg Kniševskij (LTU)	0
Abdoullah Nakaev (FRA)	10

Round of 16
Eduard Lenard (ROU)	0
Ebrahim Elahi (IRI)	7
Sungkar Seidakhmet (KAZ)	4
Prokip Kralia (UKR)	1
Gabriel Sánchez (MEX)	0
PJ Duke (USA)	8^{F}
Abdoullah Nakaev (FRA)	10
Tristan Forsman (CRC)	0

Quarterfinals
Ebrahim Elahi (IRI)	4
Sungkar Seidakhmet (KAZ)	2
PJ Duke (USA)	14
Abdoullah Nakaev (FRA)	4

Semifinals
Ebrahim Elahi (IRI)	2
PJ Duke (USA)	2

Bottom half

Round of 32
Kaloyan Atanasov (BUL)	3
Denis Kodakov (ESP)	1
Kade Brown (CAN)	2
Nurlan Aghazada (AZE)	9
Alexandr Gaidarli (MDA)	13
Goga Otinashvili (GEO)	3
Artavazd Harutyunyan (ARM)	0
Kairi Ito (JPN)	5

Round of 16
Wei Tao (CHN)	8
Kaloyan Atanasov (BUL)	4
Nurlan Aghazada (AZE)	5
Zalkarbek Tabaldiev (KGZ)	2
Dominik Jagusz (POL)	3
Alexandr Gaidarli (MDA)	14
Kairi Ito (JPN)	4
Islam Kazharov (UWW)	6

Quarterfinals
Wei Tao (CHN)	2
Nurlan Aghazada (AZE)	12
Alexandr Gaidarli (MDA)	8
Islam Kazharov (UWW)	3

Semifinals
Nurlan Aghazada (AZE)	4
Alexandr Gaidarli (MDA)	7

Repechage round 1
Umut Uslu (TUR)	11^{F}
Gabriel Sánchez (MEX)	0
Goga Otinashvili (GEO)	3
Dominik Jagusz (POL)	1

Repechage round 2
Umut Uslu (TUR)	0
Abdoullah Nakaev (FRA)	5^{F}
Goga Otinashvili (GEO)	5
Islam Kazharov (UWW)	4

Bronze medal match
Abdoullah Nakaev (FRA)	4
Ebrahim Elahi (IRI)	6
Goga Otinashvili (GEO)	0
Nurlan Aghazada (AZE)	4

=== 74 kg ===
17 and 18 August

Final

Final
Ismail Khaniev (UWW)	11
Adilet Akylbekov (KGZ)	0

Top half

Round of 32
Stiliyan Dzhorov (BUL)	0
Aghanazar Novruzov (AZE)	10
Ismail Khaniev (UWW)	10
Watan Annaorazow (TKM)	0
Mönkhbatyn Tolui (MGL)	0
Ladarion Lockett (USA)	10
Vladimir Azaryan (ARM)	4
Bohdan Oliinyk (UKR)	5
Cătălin Spînu (MDA)	0
Kanata Yamaguchi (JPN)	10

Round of 16
Manuel Wagin (GER)	7
Aghanazar Novruzov (AZE)	2
Ismail Khaniev (UWW)	5
Ladarion Lockett (USA)	2
Shen Tao (CHN)	1
Bohdan Oliinyk (UKR)	5
Kanata Yamaguchi (JPN)	16
Omar Mourad (EGY)	6

Quarterfinals
Manuel Wagin (GER)	0
Ismail Khaniev (UWW)	10
Bohdan Oliinyk (UKR)	0
Kanata Yamaguchi (JPN)	10

Semifinals
Ismail Khaniev (UWW)	7
Kanata Yamaguchi (JPN)	3

Bottom half

Round of 32
Nicholas Hooper (CAN)	0
Adilet Akylbekov (KGZ)	12
Dosszhan Kul Gaiyp (KAZ)	12
Nikolai Tarassov (EST)	1
Raul Caso (ITA)	11
Andrew Barbosa (MEX)	2
Aliaksandr Viarbitski (UWW)	2
Mohammad Mamivand (IRI)	9
Parvinder Singh (IND)	3
Aslan Öztürk (TUR)	1

Round of 16
Titas Pijoraitis (LTU)	0
Adilet Akylbekov (KGZ)	10
Dosszhan Kul Gaiyp (KAZ)	10
Saba Kobakhidze (GEO)	9
Raul Caso (ITA)	9
Mohammad Mamivand (IRI)	8
Parvinder Singh (IND)	6
Umarkhon Muydinov (UZB)	1

Quarterfinals
Adilet Akylbekov (KGZ)	8
Dosszhan Kul Gaiyp (KAZ)	3
Raul Caso (ITA)	5
Parvinder Singh (IND)	4

Semifinals
Adilet Akylbekov (KGZ)	4
Raul Caso (ITA)	2

Repechage round 1
Watan Annaorazow (TKM)	0
Ladarion Lockett (USA)	10
Nicholas Hooper (CAN)	6
Titas Pijoraitis (LTU)	3

Repechage round 2
Ladarion Lockett (USA)	8
Manuel Wagin (GER)	5
Nicholas Hooper (CAN)	0
Dosszhan Kul Gaiyp (KAZ)	10

Bronze medal match
Ladarion Lockett (USA)	0
Kanata Yamaguchi (JPN)	10
Dosszhan Kul Gaiyp (KAZ)	6
Raul Caso (ITA)	3

=== 79 kg ===
18 and 19 August

Final

Final
William Henckel (USA)	6
Mehdi Yousefi (IRI)	8

Top half

Round of 32
Keyvan Gharehdaghi (JPN)	8
Davit Tchetchelashvili (GEO)	12
Tristan Aleksandrov (EST)	2
Bohdan Oleksiienko (UKR)	8^{F}
Maksat Tabyldyev (KGZ)	5
William Henckel (USA)	8
Yerkhan Abil (KAZ)	10
Daniel Simonian (ISR)	0
Muslim Makhmudau (UWW)	13
Bolati Na Ertai (CHN)	7

Round of 16
Antoni Majchrzak (POL)	2
Davit Tchetchelashvili (GEO)	9^{F}
Bohdan Oleksiienko (UKR)	0
William Henckel (USA)	10
Leandro Araújo (BRA)	0
Yerkhan Abil (KAZ)	6
Muslim Makhmudau (UWW)	0
Amit Chhikara (IND)	9^{F}

Quarterfinals
Davit Tchetchelashvili (GEO)	5
William Henckel (USA)	11
Yerkhan Abil (KAZ)	0
Amit Chhikara (IND)	10

Semifinals
William Henckel (USA)	5
Amit Chhikara (IND)	4

Bottom half

Round of 32
Süleyman Efe Şanlı (TUR)	5
Marat Kardanov (GER)	9
Loki Bigras (CAN)	1
David Tartan (ROU)	13
Muradkhan Omarov (AZE)	9
David Kodakov (ESP)	2
Ivan Andonov (BUL)	0
Alp Arslan Begenjow (TKM)	11
Baatarkhüügiin Gan-Erdene (MGL)	12
Avraam Moustopoulos (GRE)	0
Mehdi Yousefi (IRI)	10
Ion Laurențiu Marcu (MDA)	0

Round of 16
Said Saidulov (UWW)	12
Marat Kardanov (GER)	0
David Tartan (ROU)	0
Muradkhan Omarov (AZE)	10
Alp Arslan Begenjow (TKM)	11
Baatarkhüügiin Gan-Erdene (MGL)	0
Mehdi Yousefi (IRI)	8^{F}
Narek Nikoghosyan (ARM)	0

Quarterfinals
Said Saidulov (UWW)	10
Muradkhan Omarov (AZE)	0
Alp Arslan Begenjow (TKM)	4
Mehdi Yousefi (IRI)	6

Semifinals
Said Saidulov (UWW)	7
Mehdi Yousefi (IRI)	15

Repechage round 1
Maksat Tabyldyev (KGZ)	13
Bohdan Oleksiienko (UKR)	2
Ion Laurențiu Marcu (MDA)	WO
~~Narek Nikoghosyan (ARM)~~

Repechage round 2
Maksat Tabyldyev (KGZ)	0
Davit Tchetchelashvili (GEO)	5^{F}
Ion Laurențiu Marcu (MDA)	WO
~~Alp Arslan Begenjow (TKM)~~

Bronze medal match
Davit Tchetchelashvili (GEO)	9
Amit Chhikara (IND)	6
Ion Laurențiu Marcu (MDA)	0
Said Saidulov (UWW)	11

=== 86 kg ===
19 and 20 August

Final

Final
Bozigit Islamgereev (UWW)	0
Max McEnelly (USA)	8

Top half

Round of 32
Yang Yuanchong (CHN)	0
Ahmet Yağan (TUR)	4
Bartłomiej Nowakowski (POL)	2
Ryogo Asano (JPN)	3
Döwletgeldi Myradow (TKM)	8
Nick Scherrer (SUI)	1

Round of 16
Tabriz Bayramov (AZE)	0
Mukul Dahiya (IND)	10
Ahmet Yağan (TUR)	5
Pavlo Vaskovskyi (UKR)	0
Bozigit Islamgereev (UWW)	5
Ryogo Asano (JPN)	0
Döwletgeldi Myradow (TKM)	14
Alexandru Borș (MDA)	8

Quarterfinals
Mukul Dahiya (IND)	3
Ahmet Yağan (TUR)	4
Bozigit Islamgereev (UWW)	6
Döwletgeldi Myradow (TKM)	0

Semifinals
Ahmet Yağan (TUR)	1
Bozigit Islamgereev (UWW)	5

Bottom half

Round of 32
Abolfazl Rahmani (IRI)	10
Grigor Chernakov (BUL)	0
Panagiotis Polychronidis (GRE)	0
Tomer Drozhniak (ISR)	11
Dachi Papinashvili (GEO)	10
Rohit Bal (CAN)	0

Round of 16
Kassymzhomart Alin (KAZ)	1
Abolfazl Rahmani (IRI)	7
Tomer Drozhniak (ISR)	1
Mohammad Umkhadjiev (FRA)	11
Elnur Akybaev (KGZ)	0
Dachi Papinashvili (GEO)	10
Max McEnelly (USA)	10
Razmik Yepremyan (ARM)	0

Quarterfinals
Abolfazl Rahmani (IRI)	4^{F}
Mohammad Umkhadjiev (FRA)	0
Dachi Papinashvili (GEO)	0
Max McEnelly (USA)	10

Semifinals
Abolfazl Rahmani (IRI)	5
Max McEnelly (USA)	5

Repechage round 2
Ryogo Asano (JPN)	2
Döwletgeldi Myradow (TKM)	1
Razmik Yepremyan (ARM)	5
Dachi Papinashvili (GEO)	3

Bronze medal match
Ryogo Asano (JPN)	3
Ahmet Yağan (TUR)	9
Razmik Yepremyan (ARM)	2
Abolfazl Rahmani (IRI)	4

=== 92 kg ===
18 and 19 August

Final

Final
Sherzod Poyonov (UZB)	3
Kamil Kurugliyev (KAZ)	2

Top half

Round of 32
Sherzod Poyonov (UZB)	12
Grigorios Saridis (GRE)	1
Narek Ikilikyan (ARM)	2
Gadzhimurad Gadzhibatyrov (UWW)	4
Tohid Nouri (IRI)	10
Hamza Ali Küçük (TUR)	0

Round of 16
Serghei Vizii (MDA)	0
Michealjeet Grewal (CAN)	11
Sherzod Poyonov (UZB)	16
Sorato Kanazawa (JPN)	6
Musza Arsunkaev (HUN)	0
Gadzhimurad Gadzhibatyrov (UWW)	4^{F}
Tohid Nouri (IRI)	10
Nikola Petrov (BUL)	0

Quarterfinals
Michealjeet Grewal (CAN)	3
Sherzod Poyonov (UZB)	10
Gadzhimurad Gadzhibatyrov (UWW)	3
Tohid Nouri (IRI)	1^{R}

Semifinals
Sherzod Poyonov (UZB)	4^{F}
Gadzhimurad Gadzhibatyrov (UWW)	1

Bottom half

Round of 32
Orazmuhammet Hojalyýew (TKM)	2
Anar Jafarli (AZE)	3
Connor Mirasola (USA)	10
Yuan Zixu (CHN)	0

Round of 16
Sachin (IND)	6
Yehor Horokh (UKR)	6
Anar Jafarli (AZE)	10
Aliaksei Kulakou (UWW)	0
Kamil Kurugliyev (KAZ)	7
Connor Mirasola (USA)	5
Teimuraz Kochkiani (GEO)	9
Omer Memedi (MKD)	4

Quarterfinals
Sachin (IND)	0
Anar Jafarli (AZE)	10
Kamil Kurugliyev (KAZ)	12
Teimuraz Kochkiani (GEO)	2

Semifinals
Anar Jafarli (AZE)	6
Kamil Kurugliyev (KAZ)	9

Repechage round 1
Grigorios Saridis (GRE)	0
Sorato Kanazawa (JPN)	10

Repechage round 2
Sorato Kanazawa (JPN)	12
Michealjeet Grewal (CAN)	2
Connor Mirasola (USA)	12
Teimuraz Kochkiani (GEO)	2

Bronze medal match
Sorato Kanazawa (JPN)	5
Gadzhimurad Gadzhibatyrov (UWW)	15
Connor Mirasola (USA)	10
Anar Jafarli (AZE)	0

=== 97 kg ===
17 and 18 August

Final

Final
Magomedgadzhi Magomedov (UWW)	1
Justin Rademacher (USA)	4

Top half

Round of 32
Abdelrahman Sheyatan (EGY)	11
Tejvir Dhinsa (CAN)	2

Round of 16
Li Jiawei (CHN)	2
Magomedgadzhi Magomedov (UWW)	13
Abdelrahman Sheyatan (EGY)	8
Samir Dursunov (KAZ)	9^{F}
Noah Leibowitz (JPN)	5
Aitenir Maksatov (KGZ)	0
Aliaksei Khadunou (UWW)	0
Vishal (IND)	6

Quarterfinals
Magomedgadzhi Magomedov (UWW)	14
Samir Dursunov (KAZ)	8
Noah Leibowitz (JPN)	9^{R}
Vishal (IND)	12

Semifinals
Magomedgadzhi Magomedov (UWW)	11
Vishal (IND)	9

Bottom half

Round of 32
Nikolaos Karavanos (GRE)	10
Kostiantyn Zadoianchuk (UKR)	0
Péter Zsivnovszki (HUN)	0
Ravan Musayev (AZE)	10

Round of 16
Justin Rademacher (USA)	17^{F}
İbrahim Benekli (TUR)	8
Nikolaos Karavanos (GRE)	7
Erfan Alizadeh (IRI)	5
Ashab Dadaev (FRA)	12
Ravan Musayev (AZE)	2
Andriyan Valkanov (BUL)	0
Konstantine Petriashvili (GEO)	10

Quarterfinals
Justin Rademacher (USA)	9
Nikolaos Karavanos (GRE)	1
Ashab Dadaev (FRA)	2
Konstantine Petriashvili (GEO)	3

Semifinals
Justin Rademacher (USA)	16
Konstantine Petriashvili (GEO)	5

Repechage round 2
Li Jiawei (CHN)	2
Samir Dursunov (KAZ)	12
İbrahim Benekli (TUR)	10
Nikolaos Karavanos (GRE)	6

Bronze medal match
Samir Dursunov (KAZ)	6^{F}
Vishal (IND)	0
İbrahim Benekli (TUR)	3
Konstantine Petriashvili (GEO)	8

=== 125 kg ===
17 and 18 August

Final

Final
Yedige Kassimbek (KAZ)	4
Abolfazl Mohammadnejad (IRI)	1

Top half

Round of 32
Inal Gagloev (UWW)	4
Jaspooran Singh (IND)	3

Round of 16
Sertaç Aksoy (TUR)	0
Cole Mirasola (USA)	10
Inal Gagloev (UWW)	7
Henrik Haykyan (ARM)	3
Jang Bae-joon (KOR)	6^{F}
Chanjot Kang (CAN)	6
Yedige Kassimbek (KAZ)	15
Darmaabazaryn Narantulga (MGL)	12

Quarterfinals
Cole Mirasola (USA)	3
Inal Gagloev (UWW)	0
Jang Bae-joon (KOR)	0
Yedige Kassimbek (KAZ)	6^{F}

Semifinals
Cole Mirasola (USA)	0
Yedige Kassimbek (KAZ)	11

Bottom half

Round of 32
Dian Manev (BUL)	0
Hosei Fujita (JPN)	5

Round of 16
Li Ruijie (CHN)	0
Yusif Dursunov (AZE)	4^{F}
Aleksandre Abramishvili (GEO)	10^{F}
Zhargalan Budazhapov (KGZ)	0
Levan Lagvilava (FRA)	12
Hosei Fujita (JPN)	1
Abolfazl Mohammadnejad (IRI)	7
Ivan Myroshnychenko (UKR)	0

Quarterfinals
Yusif Dursunov (AZE)	5
Aleksandre Abramishvili (GEO)	0
Levan Lagvilava (FRA)	4
Abolfazl Mohammadnejad (IRI)	11

Semifinals
Yusif Dursunov (AZE)	1
Abolfazl Mohammadnejad (IRI)	1

Repechage round 2
Darmaabazaryn Narantulga (MGL)	10
Jang Bae-joon (KOR)	0
Ivan Myroshnychenko (UKR)	1
Levan Lagvilava (FRA)	2^{F}

Bronze medal match
Darmaabazaryn Narantulga (MGL)	2
Cole Mirasola (USA)	12
Levan Lagvilava (FRA)	1
Yusif Dursunov (AZE)	3

== See also ==
- 2025 U20 World Wrestling Championships – Men's Greco-Roman
- 2025 U20 World Wrestling Championships – Women's freestyle
