= 2025 U23 World Wrestling Championships – Women's freestyle 65 kg =

Wrestling competitions

Women's freestyle 65 kg at the 2025 U23 World Championships
- Venue: SPC Vojvodina
- Dates: 23–24 October
- Competitors: 19 from 17 nations

Medalists
gold medal	Elizaveta Petliakova
silver medal	Rao Yuqi	China
bronze medal	Oleksandra Rybak	Ukraine
bronze medal	Pulkit Kandola	India

The women's freestyle 65 kilograms is a competition featured at the 2025 U23 World Wrestling Championships, and was held in Novi Sad, Serbia on 23 and 24 October 2025.

This freestyle wrestling competition consists of a single-elimination tournament, with a repechage used to determine the winner of two bronze medals. The two finalists face off for gold and silver medals. Each wrestler who loses to one of the two finalists moves into the repechage, culminating in a pair of bronze medal matches featuring the semifinal losers each facing the remaining repechage opponent from their half of the bracket.

== Results ==
Legend

- F — Won by fall

=== Final ===
Final
Rao Yuqi (CHN)	0
Elizaveta Petliakova (UWW)	4^{F}

=== Top half ===
Round of 32
Altansükhiin Davaajargal (MGL)	0
Rao Yuqi (CHN)	5

Round of 16
Dilnaz Sazanova (KGZ)	5
Mukhayyo Narzilloeva (UZB)	5
Rao Yuqi (CHN)	11
Kseniya Tsiarenia (UWW)	10
Emilija Jakovljević (SRB)	0
Vanja Gersak-Perez (GER)	4^{F}
Bianca Contrafatto (ITA)	0
Oleksandra Rybak (UKR)	10

Quarterfinals
Mukhayyo Narzilloeva (UZB)	0
Rao Yuqi (CHN)	10
Vanja Gersak-Perez (GER)	0
Oleksandra Rybak (UKR)	11

Semifinals
Rao Yuqi (CHN)	6
Oleksandra Rybak (UKR)	5

=== Bottom half ===
Round of 32
Zhangyl Beken (KAZ)	0
Beyza Nur Akkuş (TUR)	11^{F}
Enikő Elekes (HUN)	5
Ruzanna Mammadova (AZE)	2

Round of 16
Maria Sawiak (CAN)	0
Pulkit Kandola (IND)	10
Beyza Nur Akkuş (TUR)	10
Nana Ikehata (JPN)	0
Elizaveta Petliakova (UWW)	5
Enikő Elekes (HUN)	2
Bella Mir (USA)	4^{F}
Cara du Plessis (RSA)	0

Quarterfinals
Pulkit Kandola (IND)	18
Beyza Nur Akkuş (TUR)	8
Elizaveta Petliakova (UWW)	7
Bella Mir (USA)	1

Semifinals
Pulkit Kandola (IND)	6
Elizaveta Petliakova (UWW)	9

=== Repechage ===
Repechage round 1
Altansükhiin Davaajargal (MGL)	WO
Kseniya Tsiarenia (UWW)

Repechage round 2
Altansükhiin Davaajargal (MGL)	6
Mukhayyo Narzilloeva (UZB)	6
Enikő Elekes (HUN)	8
Bella Mir (USA)	0

Bronze medals
Mukhayyo Narzilloeva (UZB)	0
Oleksandra Rybak (UKR)	10
Enikő Elekes (HUN)	4
Pulkit Kandola (IND)	8

== Final standing ==
Rank	Athlete
1st place, gold medalist(s)	Elizaveta Petliakova (UWW)
2nd place, silver medalist(s)	Rao Yuqi (CHN)
3rd place, bronze medalist(s)	Oleksandra Rybak (UKR)
3rd place, bronze medalist(s)	Pulkit Kandola (IND)
5	Mukhayyo Narzilloeva (UZB)
5	Enikő Elekes (HUN)
7	Beyza Nur Akkuş (TUR)
8	Bella Mir (USA)
9	Altansükhiin Davaajargal (MGL)
10	Vanja Gersak-Perez (GER)
11	Kseniya Tsiarenia (UWW)
12	Dilnaz Sazanova (KGZ)
13	Ruzanna Mammadova (AZE)
14	Emilija Jakovljević (SRB)
15	Cara du Plessis (RSA)
16	Bianca Contrafatto (ITA)
17	Maria Sawiak (CAN)
18	Nana Ikehata (JPN)
19	Zhangyl Beken (KAZ)
