= PJ Duke =

American wrestler (born 2006)

Personal information
- Full name: Peter John Duke
- Born: July 7, 2006 (age 20) Slate Hill, New York, U.S.
- Weight: 70 kg (150 lb)

Sport
- Country: United States
- Sport: Wrestling
- Events: Freestyle and Folkstyle
- Club: Titan Mercury Wrestling Club
- Coached by: Kevin Gallagher
Medal record
Men's freestyle wrestling
Representing the United States
Grand Prix
Gold medal – first place	2024 New York	70 kg
U23 World Championships
Bronze medal – third place	2025 Novi Sad	70 kg
U20 World Championships
Gold medal – first place	2025 Samokov	70 kg
Bronze medal – third place	2024 Pontevedra	70 kg
U20 Pan American Championships
Gold medal – first place	2024 Lima	70 kg

Peter John Duke (born July 7, 2006) is an American freestyle and folkstyle wrestler who competes at 70 kilograms. In freestyle, he was the 2025 US World Team member at the senior level, 2025 U23 World bronze medalist, 2025 U20 World champion, and was a U20 World bronze medalist in 2024. Duke wrestles collegiately for the Penn State Nittany Lions.

== Career ==
=== High school ===
Born and raised in New York, Duke started wrestling around four years old. Claiming his first NYSPHSAA state title while in seventh grade and wrestling for Carmel High School, he subsequently transferred to Minisink Valley High School and became a four-time state champion, graduating in 2025. Duke committed to wrestle for the Penn State Nittany Lions in September 2023. A multiple-time high school US National champion in folkstyle and freestyle, he was named the top-ranked pound-for-pound high school wrestler in the country in 2025.

==== 2024 ====
In September, Duke, the U20 US World Team member at 70 kilograms, claimed a bronze medal at the U20 World Championships. Days later, the high school senior made his senior level freestyle debut at the US World Team Trials, where he placed third and defeated multiple NCAA Division I All-Americans, though fell to Pan American champion Alec Pantaleo.

In November, Duke claimed the gold medal at the Bill Farrell Memorial International, defeating two All-Americans and a Pan American medalist to do so.

==== 2025 ====
In May, Duke qualified for Final X after placing first at the US World Team Trials Challenge tournament, defeating 2025 NCAA Division I National champions Antrell Taylor and Ridge Lovett, as well as multiple-time All-American Bryce Andonian. Weeks later, he achieved the U20 US World Team Trials crown, and is set to compete at the U20 World Championships in August.

In June, Duke faced World silver medalist and four-time NCAA champion Yianni Diakomihalis in a best-of-three series at Final X, for the US World Team spot. After a technical fall loss in the first round, Duke forced a third match with a 17–10 win in the second round, and closed the series out with a fall in the third one, becoming the US World Team member at 18 years old.

== Freestyle record ==
Senior Freestyle Matches
Res.	Record	Opponent	Score	Date	Event	Location
2025 U23 World Championships (bronze) at 70 kg
Win	17-4	(Armenia) Davit Margaryan	Fall	October 25–26, 2025	2025 U23 World Championships	Novi Sad, Serbia
Loss	16-4	(Azerbaijan) Kanan Heybatov	TF 4-14	October 25–26, 2025	2025 U23 World Championships	Novi Sad, Serbia
Win	16-3	(Japan) Kaito Morita	9-3	October 25–26, 2025	2025 U23 World Championships	Novi Sad, Serbia
Win	15-3	(Germany) Rostislav Leicht	TF 10-0	October 25–26, 2025	2025 U23 World Championships	Novi Sad, Serbia
Win	14-3	(Uzbekistan) Begijon Kuldashev	7-1	October 25–26, 2025	2025 U23 World Championships	Novi Sad, Serbia
2025 World Championships DNP at 70 kg
Loss	13-3	(Kazakhstan) Nurkozha Kaipanov	7-11	September 13, 2025	2025 World Championships	Zagreb, Croatia
Win	13-2	(China) Chen Shuang	TF 11-0	September 13, 2025	2025 World Championships	Zagreb, Croatia
2025 US World Team Trials (gold) at 70 kg
Win	12–2	(United States) Yianni Diakomihalis	Fall	June 14, 2025	2025 Final X	(United States) Newark, New Jersey
Win	11–2	(United States) Yianni Diakomihalis	17–10	June 14, 2025	2025 Final X	(United States) Newark, New Jersey
Loss	10–2	(United States) Yianni Diakomihalis	TF 0–10	June 14, 2025	2025 Final X	(United States) Newark, New Jersey
Win	10–1	(United States) Bryce Andonian	4–1	May 16–17, 2025	2025 US World Team Trials Challenge	(United States) Louisville, Kentucky
Win	9–1	(United States) Ridge Lovett	3–2	May 16–17, 2025	2025 US World Team Trials Challenge	(United States) Louisville, Kentucky
Win	8–1	(United States) Antrell Taylor	9–6	May 16–17, 2025	2025 US World Team Trials Challenge	(United States) Louisville, Kentucky
2024 Bill Farrell Memorial International (gold) at 70 kg
Win	7–1	(United States) Will Lewan	10–4	November 8–9, 2024	2024 Bill Farrell Memorial International	(United States) New York City, New York
Win	6–1	(United States) Bryce Andonian	Fall	November 8–9, 2024	2024 Bill Farrell Memorial International	(United States) New York City, New York
Win	5–1	(Peru) Sixto Auccapina	TF 11–0	November 8–9, 2024	2024 Bill Farrell Memorial International	(United States) New York City, New York
2024 US World Team Trials (bronze) at 70 kg
Win	4–1	(United States) Yahya Thomas	5–1	September 14–15, 2024	2024 US World Team Trials	(United States) Omaha, Nebraska
Win	3–1	(United States) Will Lewan	5–2	September 14–15, 2024	2024 US World Team Trials	(United States) Omaha, Nebraska
Loss	2–1	(United States) Alec Pantaleo	0–7	September 14–15, 2024	2024 US World Team Trials	(United States) Omaha, Nebraska
Win	2–0	(United States) Jarrett Jacques	8–3	September 14–15, 2024	2024 US World Team Trials	(United States) Omaha, Nebraska
Win	1–0	(United States) Vince Bouzakis	7–0	September 14–15, 2024	2024 US World Team Trials	(United States) Omaha, Nebraska
