= Justin Rademacher =

American wrestler (born 2005)

Personal information
- Full name: Justin Lee Rademacher
- Born: May 20, 2005 (age 21)
- Home town: West Linn, Oregon, United States
- Weight: 97 kg (214 lb)

Sport
- Country: United States
- Sport: Wrestling
- Events: Freestyle and Folkstyle
Medal record
Men's freestyle wrestling
Representing the United States
Pan American Championships
| Gold medal – first place | 2025 Monterrey | 97 kg |
World U23 Championships
| Silver medal – second place | 2026 Las Vegas | 97 kg |
U20 World Championships
| Gold medal – first place | 2025 Samokov | 97 kg |
| Bronze medal – third place | 2024 Pontevedra | 97 kg |
U23 Pan American Championships
| Gold medal – first place | 2026 Lima | 97 kg |
U20 Pan American Championships
| Gold medal – first place | 2025 Lima | 97 kg |

Justin Lee Rademacher (born May 20, 2005) is an American freestyle and folkstyle wrestler who competes at 97 kilograms and 197 pounds.

== Background ==
Justin Lee Rademacher was born May 20, 2005, to parents Jack and Denise Rademacher. His hometown is West Linn, Oregon.

== Career ==
Rademacher attended West Linn High School in which he won the class 6A state title at 182 pounds in 2023. Rademacher currently attends and wrestles for Oregon State University.

Rademacher won bronze in the 97 kg category at the 2024 U20 World Wrestling Championships. He would follow up with a gold at the next edition in the 97 kg category at the 2025 U20 World Wrestling Championships, and was named the USA Wrestling Athlete of the Week. He also won gold at the 2025 Pan American Wrestling Championships in the 97 kg category. He would win gold at the 2025 U20 Pan American Wrestling Championships in the 97 category. In 2026, Rademacher won gold at the 2026 U23 Pan American Wrestling Championships in the 97 kg category.
