= Abolfazl Rahmani =

Iranian Greco-Roman wrestler

Personal information
- Full name: Abolfazl Rahmani Firouzjaei
- Nationality: Iran
- Born: 1 January 2006 (age 20) Amol, Mazandaran, Iran
- Height: 181 cm (5 ft 11 in)
- Weight: 92 kg (203 lb)

Sport
- Country: Iran
- Sport: Amateur wrestling
- Weight class: 86 kg & 92 kg
- Event: Greco-Roman
- Club: Fooladin Zob Amol
- Now coaching: Mohsen Hajipour; Hassan Hosseinzadeh
Medal record
Men's Freestyle wrestling
Representing Iran
Asian Championships
Gold medal – first place	2025 Amman	86kg
U23 World Championships
Gold medal – first place	2026 Las Vegas	92 kg
Bronze medal – third place	2025 Novi Sad	86 kg
U20 World Championships
Silver medal – second place	2026 Bratislava	92 kg
Bronze medal – third place	2025 Samokov	86 kg
Bronze medal – third place	2024 Pontevedra	86 kg
U23 Asian Championships
Gold medal – first place	2025 Bishkek	86kg
Silver medal – second place	2024 Si Racha	86kg
Grand Prix
Bronze medal – third place	2026 Ulaanbaatar Open	92 kg

Abolfazl Rahmani (Persian: ابوالفضل رحمانی, born 1 January 2006) is an Iranian Freestyle wrestler competing in the 92 kg division.

== Career ==
He won the gold medal in the 92kg event at the 2026 U23 World Wrestling Championships held in Las Vegas, USA. He also won a gold medal in the senior category at the 2025 Asian Wrestling Championships in Amman, Jordan.
