= 2024 U20 Pan American Wrestling Championships =

- Host city: Lima, Peru
- Dates: 11–13 July 2024

Champions
- Freestyle: United States
- Greco-Roman: United States
- Women: United States

The 2024 U20 Pan American Wrestling Championships was held from 11 to 13 July in Lima, Peru.

== Medal summary ==
=== Men's freestyle ===
Event	Gold	Silver	Bronze
57 kg	Luke Lilledahl; United States	Ethan Rivera; Puerto Rico	Caio Duarte Aron; Brazil
57 kg	Luke Lilledahl; United States	Ethan Rivera; Puerto Rico	Irie Jackson; Jamaica
61 kg	William Dekraker; United States	Benjamin Souza Zuckerman; Brazil	Blayne Helou; Canada
61 kg	William Dekraker; United States	Benjamin Souza Zuckerman; Brazil	Jacob Brunner; Puerto Rico
65 kg	Bo Bassett; United States	Diego Peraza Aguilar; Mexico	Arnoldo Proboste; Argentina
65 kg	Bo Bassett; United States	Diego Peraza Aguilar; Mexico	Rafael Garcia Morales; Puerto Rico
70 kg	P.J. Duke; United States	Tyler Tracy; Jamaica	Sehajpal Sidhu; Canada
70 kg	P.J. Duke; United States	Tyler Tracy; Jamaica	Jean Torres; Colombia
74 kg	Ladarion Lockett; United States	Paulo Goncalves Da Silva; Brazil	William Kennedy; Canada
74 kg	Ladarion Lockett; United States	Paulo Goncalves Da Silva; Brazil	Alexander Cusinga Gomez; Peru
79 kg	Zack Ryder; United States	Kevin Olavarria Montilla; Puerto Rico	Leandro Araujo; Brazil
79 kg	Zack Ryder; United States	Kevin Olavarria Montilla; Puerto Rico	Enrique Olvera Rodriguez; Mexico
86 kg	Aeoden Sinclair; United States	Juan Cardozo; Colombia	Rohit Bal; Canada
92 kg	Connor Mirasola; United States	Brian Ruiz Marin; Venezuela	Zaurbek Arsagov; Canada
97 kg	Camden Mc Danel; United States	Tejvir Dhinsa; Canada	Kyle Santana Oliveira; Brazil
125 kg	Nicholas Sahakian; United States	Omogbai Asekomhe; Canada	Ethan Vergara; Puerto Rico

=== Men's Greco-Roman ===
Event	Gold	Silver	Bronze
55 kg	Isaiah Cortez; United States	Abel Sanchez Juarez; Peru	Pedro De Souza Rodrigues; Brazil
60 kg	Clisman Carracedo Veliz; Ecuador	Edwin Allain Miranda; Peru	Daniel Guevara Pimentel; Mexico
63 kg	Otto Black; United States	Patrick Rodriguez Quinto; Ecuador	Zachary Marrero; Puerto Rico
63 kg	Otto Black; United States	Patrick Rodriguez Quinto; Ecuador	Peter Yllanes Verastegui; Peru
67 kg	Brennan Van Hoecke; United States	Marco Fernandez Cubas; Peru	Rafael Garcia Morales; Puerto Rico
67 kg	Brennan Van Hoecke; United States	Marco Fernandez Cubas; Peru	Arnoldo Proboste; Argentina
72 kg	Brett Back; United States	Jorge Gomez Garcia; Mexico	Oscar Barrios Rochez; Honduras
77 kg	Aydin Rix Mc Elhinney; United States	Dario Cubas Castillo; Peru	Matheus Silva De Macedo; Brazil
82 kg	Arian Khosravy; United States	Kevin Olavarria Montilla; Puerto Rico	Valentin Veron; Argentina
87 kg	Brian Ruiz Marin; Venezuela	Kauan Ferreira Gomes; Brazil	Miguel Vega; Colombia
97 kg	Dorian Trejo Olguin; Mexico	Ricardo Gomez; Argentina	Soren Herzog; United States
130 kg	Aden Attao; United States	Jorawar Dhinsa; Canada	Ethan Vergara; Puerto Rico

=== Women ===
Event	Gold	Silver	Bronze
50 kg	Julianna Ocampo; United States	Yorlenis Moran Sanchez; Panama	Vicky Leon Gomez; Ecuador
50 kg	Julianna Ocampo; United States	Yorlenis Moran Sanchez; Panama	Maia Cabrera; Argentina
53 kg	Clare Booe; United States	Yusneiry Agrazal West; Panama	Jelissa Hernandez Gomez; Mexico
53 kg	Clare Booe; United States	Yusneiry Agrazal West; Panama	Shammilka Miranda Diaz; Puerto Rico
55 kg	Madisyn Grof; Canada	Josefina Ramirez Duarte; Mexico	Lilia Gutama Chunir; Ecuador
55 kg	Madisyn Grof; Canada	Josefina Ramirez Duarte; Mexico	Janessa George; United States
57 kg	Everest Leydecker; United States	Bertha Rojas Chavez; Mexico	Karla Gruezo Ortiz; Ecuador
57 kg	Everest Leydecker; United States	Bertha Rojas Chavez; Mexico	Eliana White Vega; Puerto Rico
59 kg	Aubre Krazer; United States	Leonela Gruezo Ortiz; Ecuador	Paula Leon Adriano; Mexico
59 kg	Aubre Krazer; United States	Leonela Gruezo Ortiz; Ecuador	Camila Roa Ortega; Peru
62 kg	Melanie Jimenez Villalba; Mexico	Skylar Hattendorf; United States	Mayara Ramos Pereira; Brazil
65 kg	Mariella Schmit; United States	Michelle Olea Ruiz; Mexico	Sheyla Pedragas Moreno; Peru
68 kg	Destiny Rodriguez; United States	Vanessa Keefe; Canada	Thais Tertuliano Sales; Brazil
72 kg	Shannon Workinger; United States	Edna Jimenez Villalba; Mexico	Tehani Blais; Canada
76 kg	Kalila Shrive; United States	Rupinder Johal; Canada	Paola Rodriguez Guzman; Puerto Rico

== Medal table ==
* Host nation (Peru)

Rank	Nation	Gold	Silver	Bronze	Total
1	United States	25	1	2	28
2	Mexico	2	6	4	12
3	Canada	1	5	6	12
4	Ecuador	1	2	3	6
5	Venezuela	1	1	0	2
6	Peru*	0	4	4	8
7	Puerto Rico	0	3	9	12
8	Brazil	0	3	7	10
9	Panama	0	2	0	2
10	Argentina	0	1	4	5
11	Colombia	0	1	2	3
12	Jamaica	0	1	1	2
13	Honduras	0	0	1	1
Totals (13 entries)		30	30	43	103

== Team ranking ==
Rank	Men's freestyle		Men's Greco-Roman		Women's freestyle	
Rank	Team	Points	Team	Points	Team	Points
1	United States	250	United States	200	United States	235
2	Canada	127	Peru	140	Mexico	164
3	Brazil	114	Mexico	109	Canada	120
4	Puerto Rico	109	Brazil	106	Ecuador	105
5	Mexico	93	Puerto Rico	95	Peru	101
6	Peru	80	Ecuador	86	Puerto Rico	88
7	Ecuador	56	Argentina	58	Brazil	77
8	Jamaica	44	Panama	28	Panama	40
9	Colombia	43	Venezuela	25	Colombia	36
10	Argentina	43	Canada	20	Argentina	15
11	Panama	23	Paraguay	17	Chile	13
12	Venezuela	20	Bolivia	16	Honduras	10
13	Paraguay	12	Colombia Honduras	15	Guatemala Paraguay	6
14	Barbados Bolivia	10	—			
15	—		Chile	10		
16	Guatemala	6	Barbados	9		
17	Chile	4	Guatemala	8		
