= 2025 U20 Pan American Wrestling Championships =

- Host city: Lima, Peru
- Dates: 10–12 July 2025

Champions
- Freestyle: United States
- Greco-Roman: United States
- Women: United States

The 2025 U20 Pan American Wrestling Championships was held from 10 to 12 July in Lima, Peru.

== Medal summary ==
=== Men's freestyle ===
Event	Gold	Silver	Bronze
57 kg	Caio Duarte Aron; Brazil	Irie Jackson; Jamaica	Antonio Mills III; United States
57 kg	Caio Duarte Aron; Brazil	Irie Jackson; Jamaica	Abel Sanchez Juarez; Peru
61 kg	Kyler Larkin; United States	Omar Ayoub; Puerto Rico	Karson Brown; Canada
61 kg	Kyler Larkin; United States	Omar Ayoub; Puerto Rico	Luiz Angelo Silva; Brazil
65 kg	Luke Stanich; United States	Yandro Soto Rivera; Puerto Rico	Diego Peraza Aguilar; Mexico
65 kg	Luke Stanich; United States	Yandro Soto Rivera; Puerto Rico	Khalin Radev; Canada
70 kg	Kade Brown; Canada	Jazziel Balam Canul; Mexico	Jaxon Joy; United States
70 kg	Kade Brown; Canada	Jazziel Balam Canul; Mexico	Anthony Molino Rubio; Peru
74 kg	William Denny; United States	Kevin Aleman Gomez; El Salvador	Joao Reis Goncalves Silva; Brazil
74 kg	William Denny; United States	Kevin Aleman Gomez; El Salvador	Nicholas Hooper; Canada
79 kg	William Henckel; United States	Leandro Araujo; Brazil	Vincent Echavarry; Puerto Rico
79 kg	William Henckel; United States	Leandro Araujo; Brazil	Axel Nava Guzman; Mexico
86 kg	Adam Waters; United States	Max Franca Magalhaes de Almeida; Brazil	Rohit Bal; Canada
92 kg	Connor Mirasola; United States	Michealjeet Grewal; Canada	Jean Zambrano Longas; Ecuador
97 kg	Justin Rademacher; United States	Tejvir Dhinsa; Canada	Kyle Santana Oliveira; Brazil
125 kg	Cole Mirasola; United States	Chanjot Kang; Canada	Leonardo Guerrero Aviles; Mexico

=== Men's Greco-Roman ===
Event	Gold	Silver	Bronze
55 kg	Abel Sanchez Juarez; Peru	Yuri Landim Ribeiro; Brazil	Jose Castañeda; Colombia
55 kg	Abel Sanchez Juarez; Peru	Yuri Landim Ribeiro; Brazil	Moises Peralta Gonzalez; Ecuador
60 kg	Pedro de Souza Rodrigues; Brazil	Augusto Vargas Valle; Chile	Daniel Guevara Pimentel; Mexico
63 kg	Diego Terriquez Ibarra; Mexico	Clisman Carracedo Veliz; Ecuador	William Pozo Chuquillanqui; Peru
67 kg	Pierson Manville; United States	Lucas Marciel da Silva; Brazil	Abisai Camacho Valenciano; Mexico
72 kg	Jude Randall; United States	Jorge Gomez Garcia; Mexico	Anthony Molina Rubio; Peru
77 kg	Leister Bowling Iv; United States	Alonso Parra; Colombia	Dario Cubas Castillo; Peru
77 kg	Leister Bowling Iv; United States	Alonso Parra; Colombia	Mauro Resendiz Dominguez; Mexico
82 kg	John Saenz Corea; Guatemala	Maycki Flores Ayala; Peru	Gavin Ricketts; United States
87 kg	Nicholas Nosler; United States	Cesar Veliz Perez; Mexico	Christopher Sanchez; Puerto Rico
97 kg	Dorian Trejo Olguin; Mexico	Quinlan Morgan; United States	Sadath Ortega Ospino; Panama
130 kg	Shilo Jones; United States	Ibrack Angulo Castillo; Ecuador	Joao Silva Diniz; Brazil

=== Women ===
Event	Gold	Silver	Bronze
50 kg	Gabriele Tedesco; United States	Ana Sales Lima; Brazil	Elizabeth Chapman; Canada
50 kg	Gabriele Tedesco; United States	Ana Sales Lima; Brazil	Anett Huaman Mallqui; Peru
53 kg	Alexandra Waitsman; United States	Mayangelie Colon Davila; Puerto Rico	Brooklyn Glasgow; Canada
55 kg	Aspen Blasko; United States	Abby Wolff; Canada	Maria Garcia Lopez; Mexico
57 kg	Agnia Krakovska; Canada	Carissa Qureshi; United States	Thaina Anibal Ribeiro; Brazil
59 kg	Bella Williams; United States	Cecilia Barranco Solano; Mexico	Ella Finding; Canada
62 kg	Annika Fines; Canada	Lilly Luft; United States	Neevis Rodriguez Cantu; Mexico
62 kg	Annika Fines; Canada	Lilly Luft; United States	Leonela Gruezo Ortiz; Ecuador
65 kg	Cadence Diduch; United States	Mackenzie Cayer; Canada	Ruth Jimenez Batista; Puerto Rico
68 kg	Eduarda Rodrigues Batista; Brazil	Zoey Lints; United States	Lene Mccrackin; Canada
72 kg	Keeley Kehrli; United States	Kiki Idowu; Canada	Sofia De Leon Gonzalez; Mexico
76 kg	Edna Jimenez Villalba; Mexico	Rupinder Johal; Canada	Aireka Steigler; United States

== Medal table ==
* Host nation (Peru)

Rank	Nation	Gold	Silver	Bronze	Total
1	United States	19	4	4	27
2	Canada	3	7	8	18
3	Brazil	3	5	5	13
4	Mexico	3	4	9	16
5	Peru*	1	1	6	8
6	Guatemala	1	0	0	1
7	Puerto Rico	0	3	3	6
8	Ecuador	0	2	3	5
9	Colombia	0	1	1	2
10	Chile	0	1	0	1
10	El Salvador	0	1	0	1
10	Jamaica	0	1	0	1
13	Panama	0	0	1	1
Totals (13 entries)		30	30	40	100

== Team ranking ==
Rank	Men's freestyle		Men's Greco-Roman		Women's freestyle	
Rank	Team	Points	Team	Points	Team	Points
1	United States	230	United States	188	United States	225
2	Canada	153	Mexico	167	Canada	190
3	Brazil	128	Peru	131	Mexico	142
4	Mexico	100	Brazil	124	Brazil	92
5	Puerto Rico	97	Ecuador	90	Peru	88
6	Peru	86	Chile	52	Puerto Rico	77
7	Ecuador	45	Guatemala	47	Ecuador	43
8	Panama	42	Panama Puerto Rico	46	Colombia	20
9	Guatemala	36	—N/a		Guatemala	18
10	El Salvador Jamaica	20	Colombia	44	Chile	9
11	—N/a					
12	Chile	16				
13	Colombia Costa Rica	10				
