= Abdullah Toprak (wrestler, born 2005) =

Turkish freestyle wrestler (born 2005)

Personal information
- Born: 1 January 2005 (age 21) Tokat, Turkey
- Height: 165 cm (5 ft 5 in)

Sport
- Country: Turkey
- Sport: Amateur wrestling
- Weight class: 65 kg
- Event: Freestyle
- Club: Ankara ASKI Sports Club
Medal record
Men's freestyle wrestling
Representing Turkey
World U23 Championships
Bronze medal – third place	2023 Tirana	65 kg
Bronze medal – third place	2026 Las Vegas	70 kg
European U23 Championships
Silver medal – second place	2025 Tirana	65 kg
Bronze medal – third place	2024 Baku	65 kg
World U20 Championships
Bronze medal – third place	2023 Amman	65 kg
Bronze medal – third place	2025 Samokov	65 kg
Bronze medal – third place	2026 Bratislava	65 kg
European U20 Championships
Gold medal – first place	2024 Novi Sad	65 kg
Bronze medal – third place	2025 Caorle	65 kg
World U17 Championships
Silver medal – second place	2021 Budapest	55 kg
European U17 Championships
Gold medal – first place	2022 Bucharest	60 kg
Bronze medal – third place	2021 Samokov	53 kg

Abdullah Toprak (born 1 January 2005) is a Turkish freestyle wrestler competing in the 65 kg division. He is a member of Ankara ASKI Sports Club.

== Career ==
Abdullah Toprak won the bronze medal by defeating Kyrgyz Aden Sakybaev 5–3 in the freestyle 65 kilo third place match at the 2023 U20 World Wrestling Championships in Amman, Jordan.

He won the bronze medal by defeating Indian Mohit Kumar 11–6 in the freestyle 65 kg third place match at the 2023 U23 World Wrestling Championships in Tirana, Albania.

Abdullah Toprak won the silver medal in the men's freestyle 65 kg category at the 2025 European U23 Wrestling Championships held in Tirana, Albania.
