= 2026 U23 World Wrestling Championships =

- Host city: Las Vegas, United States
- Dates: 12–18 October
- Stadium: Thomas & Mack Center

Champions
- Freestyle: Iran
- Greco-Roman: Iran
- Women: Ukraine

The 2026 U23 World Wrestling Championships will be the ninth edition of the U23 World Wrestling Championships of combined events and it will held from 12 to 18 October 2026 in Las Vegas, United States.

== Competition schedule ==
All times are (UTC–7)

Date	Time	Event
12 October	10:30–15:00	Qualification rounds: GR 60–67–72–82–97 kg
12 October	18:00–20:30	Semi-finals: GR 60–67–72–82–97 kg
13 October	10:30–15:00	Qualification rounds: GR 55–63–77–87–130 kg; Repechage: GR 60–67–72–82–97 kg
13 October	16:45–17:45	Semi-finals: GR 55–67–72–97 kg
13 October	18:00–20:30	Finals: GR 60–67–72–82–97 kg
14 October	10:30–13:30	Qualification rounds: WW 50–55–59–68–76 kg; Repechage: GR 55–63–77–87–130 kg
14 October	16:45–17:45	Semi-finals: WW 50–55–59–68–76 kg
14 October	18:00–20:30	Finals: GR 55–63–77–87–130 kg
15 October	10:30–13:30	Qualification rounds: WW 53–57–62–65–72 kg; Repechage: WW 50–55–59–68–76 kg
15 October	16:45–17:45	Semi-finals: WW 53–57–62–65–72 kg
15 October	18:00–20:30	Finals: WW 50–55–59–68–76 kg
16 October	10:30–14:30	Qualification rounds: FS 61–74–86–92–125 kg; Repechage: WW 53–57–62–65–72 kg
16 October	16:45–17:45	Semi-finals: FS 61–74–86–92–125 kg
16 October	18:00–20:30	Finals: WW 53–57–62–65–72 kg
17 October	10:30–14:30	Qualification rounds: FS 57–65–70–79–97 kg; Repechage: FS 61–74–86–92–125 kg
17 October	16:45–17:45	Semi-finals: FS 57–65–70–79–97 kg
17 October	18:00–20:30	Finals: FS 61–74–86–92–125 kg
18 October	10:30–12:30	Repechage: FS 57–65–70–79–97 kg
18 October	13:00–15:30	Finals: FS 57–65–70–79–97 kg

== Medal table ==
* Host nation (United States)

Rank	Nation	Gold	Silver	Bronze	Total
1	Russia	7	3	3	13
2	Iran	7	1	6	14
3	United States*	3	3	4	10
4	Ukraine	3	2	2	7
5	Kazakhstan	3	1	3	7
6	Belarus	2	1	0	3
7	Japan	1	3	8	12
8	Georgia	1	1	4	6
9	China	1	1	2	4
10	Hungary	1	1	1	3
11	Egypt	1	0	0	1
12	Turkey	0	4	5	9
13	India	0	2	4	6
14	Azerbaijan	0	2	3	5
15	Armenia	0	2	1	3
16	Kyrgyzstan	0	1	2	3
17	Serbia	0	1	0	1
17	Sweden	0	1	0	1
19	Mongolia	0	0	3	3
20	Mexico	0	0	2	2
21	Colombia	0	0	1	1
21	Estonia	0	0	1	1
21	Germany	0	0	1	1
21	Italy	0	0	1	1
21	Moldova	0	0	1	1
21	Norway	0	0	1	1
21	Spain	0	0	1	1
Totals (27 entries)		30	30	60	120

== Team ranking ==
Rank	Men's freestyle		Men's Greco-Roman		Women's freestyle	
Rank	Team	Points	Team	Points	Team	Points
1	Iran	180	Iran	119	Ukraine	143
2	Russia	171	Kazakhstan	114	United States	117
3	United States	104	Russia	105	Japan	108
4	Turkey	99	Georgia	97	Russia	78
5	Japan	75	Azerbaijan	77	China	72
6	Georgia	68	Armenia	74	Turkey	67
7	India	57	Turkey	73	India	63
8	Kazakhstan	55	Ukraine	56	Belarus	59
9	Armenia	49	Kyrgyzstan	56	Hungary	54
10	Azerbaijan	42	Japan	50	Kazakhstan	51

== Medal summary ==
=== Men's freestyle ===
Event	Gold	Silver	Bronze
57 kg	Merey Bazarbayev; Kazakhstan	Bekir Keser; Turkey	Daito Katsume; Japan
57 kg	Merey Bazarbayev; Kazakhstan	Bekir Keser; Turkey	Rohit; India
61 kg	Benjamin Davino; United States	Iukhan Dokturbek Uulu; Kyrgyzstan	Ebrahim Khari; Iran
61 kg	Benjamin Davino; United States	Iukhan Dokturbek Uulu; Kyrgyzstan	Sargis Begoyan; Armenia
65 kg	Ahoura Khateri; Iran	Kaiji Ogino; Japan	Eldar Akhmadudinov; Russia
65 kg	Ahoura Khateri; Iran	Kaiji Ogino; Japan	Jaskaran Singh; India
70 kg	Magomed-Emi Eltemirov; Russia	Ebrahim Elahi; Iran	Abdullah Toprak; Turkey
70 kg	Magomed-Emi Eltemirov; Russia	Ebrahim Elahi; Iran	Alexandr Gaidarli; Moldova
74 kg	Magomed Baitukaev; Russia	Jayden James; United States	Toki Ogawa; Japan
74 kg	Magomed Baitukaev; Russia	Jayden James; United States	Ali Karampour; Iran
79 kg	Mehdi Yousefi; Iran	Said Saidulov; Russia	Kanata Yamaguchi; Japan
79 kg	Mehdi Yousefi; Iran	Said Saidulov; Russia	Chander Mohan; India
86 kg	Arsen Balaian; Russia	Ahmet Yağan; Turkey	Reza Afshar; Iran
86 kg	Arsen Balaian; Russia	Ahmet Yağan; Turkey	Naadambatyn Batbilgüün; Mongolia
92 kg	Abolfazl Rahmani; Iran	Arslan Bagaev; Russia	Anar Jafarli; Azerbaijan
92 kg	Abolfazl Rahmani; Iran	Arslan Bagaev; Russia	Sandro Kurashvili; Georgia
97 kg	Mukhamed-Takhir Khaniev; Russia	Justin Rademacher; United States	Mohammad Mobin Azimi; Iran
97 kg	Mukhamed-Takhir Khaniev; Russia	Justin Rademacher; United States	Konstantine Petriashvili; Georgia
125 kg	Abolfazl Mohammadnejad; Iran	Aleksandre Abramishvili; Georgia	Khetag Karsanov; Azerbaijan
125 kg	Abolfazl Mohammadnejad; Iran	Aleksandre Abramishvili; Georgia	Coby Merrill; United States

=== Men's Greco-Roman ===
Event	Gold	Silver	Bronze
55 kg	Koba Karumidze; Georgia	Vishvajit More; India	Arsen Zhuma; Kazakhstan
55 kg	Koba Karumidze; Georgia	Vishvajit More; India	Malik Gigiev; Russia
60 kg	Aibek Aitbekov; Kazakhstan	Elmir Aliyev; Azerbaijan	Kubanych Arinov; Kyrgyzstan
60 kg	Aibek Aitbekov; Kazakhstan	Elmir Aliyev; Azerbaijan	Seima Tokuhara; Japan
63 kg	Erfan Jarkani; Iran	Manato Nakamura; Japan	Igor Punchenko; Russia
63 kg	Erfan Jarkani; Iran	Manato Nakamura; Japan	Servet Angi; Turkey
67 kg	Erzu Zakriev; Russia	Azat Sarıyar; Turkey	Mohammad Kamali; Iran
67 kg	Erzu Zakriev; Russia	Azat Sarıyar; Turkey	Takaku Suzuki; Japan
72 kg	Yussuf Ashrapov; Kazakhstan	Gaspar Terteryan; Armenia	İbrahim Özdemir; Turkey
72 kg	Yussuf Ashrapov; Kazakhstan	Gaspar Terteryan; Armenia	Nilson Sinisterra; Colombia
77 kg	Moustafa Alameldin; Egypt	Levente Lévai; Hungary	Ruslan Nurullayev; Azerbaijan
77 kg	Moustafa Alameldin; Egypt	Levente Lévai; Hungary	Anri Putkaradze; Georgia
82 kg	Abolfazl Mohmadi; Iran	Martik Petrosyan; Armenia	Tornike Mikeladze; Georgia
82 kg	Abolfazl Mohmadi; Iran	Martik Petrosyan; Armenia	Erlan Mars Uulu; Kyrgyzstan
87 kg	Yasin Yazdi; Iran	Temirlan Turdakyn; Kazakhstan	Martin Ljosåk; Norway
87 kg	Yasin Yazdi; Iran	Temirlan Turdakyn; Kazakhstan	Alperen Berber; Turkey
97 kg	Abubakar Khaslakhanau; Belarus	Yehor Yakushenko; Ukraine	Mohammad Hadi Seidi; Iran
97 kg	Abubakar Khaslakhanau; Belarus	Yehor Yakushenko; Ukraine	Darius Kiefer; Germany
130 kg	Jiang Wenhao; China	Ali Iliasov; Russia	Jokhar Uzarov; Kazakhstan
130 kg	Jiang Wenhao; China	Ali Iliasov; Russia	Kevin Uspenski; Estonia

=== Women's freestyle ===
Event	Gold	Silver	Bronze
50 kg	Haruna Morikawa; Japan	Aida Kerymova; Ukraine	Liu Xinyu; China
50 kg	Haruna Morikawa; Japan	Aida Kerymova; Ukraine	Morgan Turner; United States
53 kg	Cristelle Rodriguez; United States	Şevval Çayır; Turkey	Carla Jaume; Spain
53 kg	Cristelle Rodriguez; United States	Şevval Çayır; Turkey	Anastasiia Polska; Ukraine
55 kg	Gerda Terék; Hungary	Yuna Sawatani; Japan	Everest Leydecker; United States
55 kg	Gerda Terék; Hungary	Yuna Sawatani; Japan	Shugyla Omirbek; Kazakhstan
57 kg	Aryna Martynava; Belarus	Tindra Dalmyr; Sweden	Bertha Rojas; Mexico
57 kg	Aryna Martynava; Belarus	Tindra Dalmyr; Sweden	Ichika Arai; Japan
59 kg	Alina Filipovych; Ukraine	Günay Qurbanova; Azerbaijan	Komal; India
59 kg	Alina Filipovych; Ukraine	Günay Qurbanova; Azerbaijan	Natsuki Yamaguchi; Japan
62 kg	Iryna Bondar; Ukraine	Adaugo Nwachukwu; United States	Enikő Elekes; Hungary
62 kg	Iryna Bondar; Ukraine	Adaugo Nwachukwu; United States	Melanie Jiménez; Mexico
65 kg	Ekaterina Koshkina; Russia	Rao Yuqi; China	Reese Larramendy; United States
65 kg	Ekaterina Koshkina; Russia	Rao Yuqi; China	Nyamsürengiin Narkhajid; Mongolia
68 kg	Alina Shevchenko; Russia	Kseniya Tsiarenia; Belarus	Ray Hoshino; Japan
68 kg	Alina Shevchenko; Russia	Kseniya Tsiarenia; Belarus	Laura Godino; Italy
72 kg	Iryna Zablotska; Ukraine	Amruta Pujari; India	Erdene-Ochiryn Odgerel; Mongolia
72 kg	Iryna Zablotska; Ukraine	Amruta Pujari; India	Qiu Wenjin; China
76 kg	Kylie Welker; United States	Evelin Ujhelji; Serbia	Nadiia Sokolovska; Ukraine
76 kg	Kylie Welker; United States	Evelin Ujhelji; Serbia	Elmira Yasin; Turkey

== Participating nations ==
641 wrestlers from 65 countries competed.

1. Albania (2)
2. Argentina (2)
3. Armenia (20)
4. Austria (2)
5. Azerbaijan (23)
6. Belarus (14)
7. Belgium (1)
8. Brazil (3)
9. Bulgaria (11)
10. Canada (20)
11. Cape Verde (1)
12. Chile (2)
13. China (28)
14. Colombia (9)
15. Croatia (5)
16. Czech Republic (3)
17. Democratic Republic of the Congo (6)
18. Denmark (3)
19. Dominican Republic (1)
20. Ecuador (2)
21. Egypt (4)
22. El Salvador (2)
23. Estonia (4)
24. Finland (2)
25. France (4)
26. Gambia (1)
27. Georgia (20)
28. Germany (9)
29. Ghana (1)
30. Greece (8)
31. Hungary (14)
32. India (21)
33. Iran (20)
34. Ireland (1)
35. Israel (3)
36. Italy (6)
37. Jamaica (4)
38. Japan (30)
39. Kazakhstan (30)
40. Kyrgyzstan (20)
41. Mexico (23)
42. Moldova (16)
43. Mongolia (12)
44. New Zealand (4)
45. Nigeria (1)
46. Norway (4)
47. Panama (2)
48. Peru (2)
49. Philippines (1)
50. Poland (15)
51. Portugal (9)
52. Puerto Rico (12)
53. Romania (8)
54. Russia (30)
55. Serbia (6)
56. Slovakia (2)
57. Spain (3)
58. Sweden (6)
59. Switzerland (2)
60. Turkey (29)
61. Turkmenistan (3)
62. Ukraine (30)
63. United States (30)
64. Uzbekistan (20)
65. Venezuela (9)
