= 2025 U20 World Wrestling Championships =

- Host city: Samokov, Bulgaria
- Dates: 17–24 August
- Stadium: Arena Samokov

Champions
- Freestyle: United States
- Greco-Roman: Iran
- Women: Japan

The 2025 U20 World Wrestling Championships were the 44th edition of the U20 World Wrestling Championships and were held in Samokov, Bulgaria, between 17 and 24 August 2025.

== Competition schedule ==
All times are (UTC+3)

Date	Time	Event
17 August	10.00	Qualification rounds FS 70-74-97-125 kg
17 August	18:00	Semi Finals FS 70-74-97-125 kg
18 August	10.00	Qualification rounds FS 57-65-79-92 kg; Repechages FS 70-74-97-125 kg
18 August	17:15	Semi Finals FS 57-65-79-92 kg
18 August	18:00	Finals FS 70-74-97-125 kg
19 August	10.00	Qualification rounds FS 61-86 WW 57-59-68 kg; Repechages FS 57-65-79-92 kg
19 August	16:45	Semi Finals FS 61-86 WW 57-59-68 kg
19 August	18:00	Finals FS 57-65-79-92 kg
20 August	10.00	Qualification rounds WW 55-62-65-76 kg; Repechages FS 61-86 WW 57-59-68 kg
20 August	16:45	Semi Finals WW 55-62-65-76 kg
20 August	18:00	Finals FS 61-86 WW 57-59-68 kg
21 August	10.00	Qualification rounds GR 60–82 kg WW 50-53-72 kg; Repechages WW 55-62-65-76 kg
21 August	16:45	Semi Finals GR 60–82 kg WW 50-53-72 kg
21 August	18:00	Finals WW 55-62-65-76 kg
22 August	10.00	Qualification rounds GR 55-67-72-97 kg; Repechages GR 60–82 kg WW 50-53-72 kg
22 August	16:45	Semi Finals GR 55-67-72-97 kg
22 August	18:00	Finals GR 60–82 kg WW 50-53-72 kg
23 August	10.00	Qualification rounds GR 63-77-87-130 kg; Repechages GR 55-67-72-97 kg
23 August	16:45	Semi Finals GR 63-77-87-130 kg
23 August	18:00	Finals GR 55-67-72-97 kg
24 August	16.00	Repechages GR 63-77-87-130 kg
24 August	18:00	Finals GR 63-77-87-130 kg

== Medal table ==
* Host nation (Bulgaria)

Rank	Nation	Gold	Silver	Bronze	Total
1	United States	6	2	2	10
2	Japan	5	1	5	11
–	United World Wrestling	4	5	11	20
3	Iran	2	4	4	10
4	India	2	4	3	9
5	Uzbekistan	2	1	3	6
6	Ukraine	2	1	2	5
7	Georgia	2	0	3	5
8	Kazakhstan	1	2	7	10
9	Azerbaijan	1	2	4	7
10	Armenia	1	2	2	5
11	China	1	1	3	5
12	Kyrgyzstan	1	1	2	4
13	Turkey	0	1	3	4
14	Moldova	0	1	0	1
14	Norway	0	1	0	1
14	Sweden	0	1	0	1
17	Brazil	0	0	1	1
17	Finland	0	0	1	1
17	Germany	0	0	1	1
17	Hungary	0	0	1	1
17	Mongolia	0	0	1	1
17	Puerto Rico	0	0	1	1
Totals (22 entries)		30	30	60	120

== Team ranking ==
Rank	Men's freestyle		Men's Greco-Roman		Women's freestyle	
Rank	Team	Points	Team	Points	Team	Points
1	United States	185	Iran	117	Japan	165
2	Kazakhstan	112	Armenia	98	India	140
3	Iran	111	Azerbaijan	90	China	104
4	Azerbaijan	71	Uzbekistan	85	United States	95
5	Georgia	66	Kazakhstan	75	Ukraine	92
6	India	60	Georgia	67	Turkey	59
7	Japan	57	Ukraine	64	Sweden	38
8	Turkey	46	Japan	52	Mongolia	37
9	Moldova	44	Kyrgyzstan	51	Azerbaijan	35
10	Armenia	35	India	47	Kyrgyzstan	25

== Medal summary ==
=== Men's freestyle ===
Event	Gold	Silver	Bronze
57 kg	Magomed-Saliakh Ozdamirov; United World Wrestling	Sumit Malik; India	Nurdanat Aitanov; Kazakhstan
57 kg	Magomed-Saliakh Ozdamirov; United World Wrestling	Sumit Malik; India	Vasif Baghirov; Azerbaijan
61 kg	Marcus Blaze; United States	Ahoura Khateri; Iran	Magomedkhan Magamedkhanov; United World Wrestling
61 kg	Marcus Blaze; United States	Ahoura Khateri; Iran	Omar Ayoub; Puerto Rico
65 kg	Luke Stanich; United States	Reiji Uchida; Japan	Abdullah Toprak; Turkey
65 kg	Luke Stanich; United States	Reiji Uchida; Japan	Arman Musikyan; Armenia
70 kg	PJ Duke; United States	Alexandr Gaidarli; Moldova	Ebrahim Elahi; Iran
70 kg	PJ Duke; United States	Alexandr Gaidarli; Moldova	Nurlan Aghazada; Azerbaijan
74 kg	Ismail Khaniev; United World Wrestling	Adilet Akylbekov; Kyrgyzstan	Kanata Yamaguchi; Japan
74 kg	Ismail Khaniev; United World Wrestling	Adilet Akylbekov; Kyrgyzstan	Dosszhan Kul Gaiyp; Kazakhstan
79 kg	Mehdi Yousefi; Iran	William Henckel; United States	Davit Tchetchelashvili; Georgia
79 kg	Mehdi Yousefi; Iran	William Henckel; United States	Said Saidulov; United World Wrestling
86 kg	Max McEnelly; United States	Bozigit Islamgereev; United World Wrestling	Ahmet Yağan; Turkey
86 kg	Max McEnelly; United States	Bozigit Islamgereev; United World Wrestling	Abolfazl Rahmani; Iran
92 kg	Sherzod Poyonov; Uzbekistan	Kamil Kurugliyev; Kazakhstan	Gadzhimurad Gadzhibatyrov; United World Wrestling
92 kg	Sherzod Poyonov; Uzbekistan	Kamil Kurugliyev; Kazakhstan	Connor Mirasola; United States
97 kg	Justin Rademacher; United States	Magomedgadzhi Magomedov; United World Wrestling	Samir Dursunov; Kazakhstan
97 kg	Justin Rademacher; United States	Magomedgadzhi Magomedov; United World Wrestling	Konstantine Petriashvili; Georgia
125 kg	Yedige Kassimbek; Kazakhstan	Abolfazl Mohammadnejad; Iran	Cole Mirasola; United States
125 kg	Yedige Kassimbek; Kazakhstan	Abolfazl Mohammadnejad; Iran	Yusif Dursunov; Azerbaijan

=== Men's Greco-Roman ===
Event	Gold	Silver	Bronze
55 kg	Payam Ahmadi; Iran	Turan Dashdamirov; Azerbaijan	Daisuke Morishita; Japan
55 kg	Payam Ahmadi; Iran	Turan Dashdamirov; Azerbaijan	Arsen Zhuma; Kazakhstan
60 kg	Aykhan Javadov; Azerbaijan	Yurik Mkhitaryan; Armenia	Suraj Vashisht; India
60 kg	Aykhan Javadov; Azerbaijan	Yurik Mkhitaryan; Armenia	Vakhtang Lolua; Georgia
63 kg	Aytjan Khalmakhanov; Uzbekistan	Aleks Margaryan; Armenia	Igor Punchenko; United World Wrestling
63 kg	Aytjan Khalmakhanov; Uzbekistan	Aleks Margaryan; Armenia	Mohammad-Javad Aboutalebi; Iran
67 kg	Zhantoro Mirzaliev; Kyrgyzstan	Erzu Zakriev; United World Wrestling	Faraim Mustafayev; Azerbaijan
67 kg	Zhantoro Mirzaliev; Kyrgyzstan	Erzu Zakriev; United World Wrestling	Fayozbek Eshmirzaev; Uzbekistan
72 kg	Gaspar Terteryan; Armenia	Ahmad Kodirov; Uzbekistan	Yussuf Ashrapov; Kazakhstan
72 kg	Gaspar Terteryan; Armenia	Ahmad Kodirov; Uzbekistan	Oliver Pada; Finland
77 kg	Anri Putkaradze; Georgia	Ahoura Bouveiri; Iran	Kiryl Valeuski; United World Wrestling
77 kg	Anri Putkaradze; Georgia	Ahoura Bouveiri; Iran	Zaur Beslekoev; United World Wrestling
82 kg	Mikhail Shkarin; United World Wrestling	Dias Seitkaliyev; Kazakhstan	Azimjon Soatullaev; Uzbekistan
82 kg	Mikhail Shkarin; United World Wrestling	Dias Seitkaliyev; Kazakhstan	Taizo Yoshida; Japan
87 kg	Luka Kochalidze; Georgia	Abdurakhman Abdulkadyrov; United World Wrestling	Temirlan Turdakyn; Kazakhstan
87 kg	Luka Kochalidze; Georgia	Abdurakhman Abdulkadyrov; United World Wrestling	Erik Ter-Matevosyan; Armenia
97 kg	Yehor Yakushenko; Ukraine	Mohammad Hadi Seidi; Iran	Darius Kiefer; Germany
97 kg	Yehor Yakushenko; Ukraine	Mohammad Hadi Seidi; Iran	Ilia Komarov; United World Wrestling
130 kg	Ali Iliasov; United World Wrestling	Cemal Yusuf Bakır; Turkey	Abolfazl Fathi; Iran
130 kg	Ali Iliasov; United World Wrestling	Cemal Yusuf Bakır; Turkey	Ivan Yankovskyi; Ukraine

=== Women's freestyle ===
Event	Gold	Silver	Bronze
50 kg	Rinka Ogawa; Japan	Audrey Jimenez; United States	Shruti Kundu; India
50 kg	Rinka Ogawa; Japan	Audrey Jimenez; United States	Hu Na; China
53 kg	Natsumi Masuda; Japan	Anastasiia Polska; Ukraine	Kseniya Kostsenich; United World Wrestling
53 kg	Natsumi Masuda; Japan	Anastasiia Polska; Ukraine	Saarika; India
55 kg	Everest Leydecker; United States	Reena Sangwan; India	Gerda Terék; Hungary
55 kg	Everest Leydecker; United States	Reena Sangwan; India	So Tsutsui; Japan
57 kg	Tapasya Gahlawat; India	Felicitas Domajeva; Norway	Anna Stratan; Kazakhstan
57 kg	Tapasya Gahlawat; India	Felicitas Domajeva; Norway	Dolzhon Tsyngueva; United World Wrestling
59 kg	Sakura Onishi; Japan	Amelia Samuelsson; Sweden	Zhu Yifan; China
59 kg	Sakura Onishi; Japan	Amelia Samuelsson; Sweden	Hiunai Hurbanova; Azerbaijan
62 kg	Yangzhen; China	Ruzanna Mammadova; Azerbaijan	Nigina Sabirova; Uzbekistan
62 kg	Yangzhen; China	Ruzanna Mammadova; Azerbaijan	Shirin Takemoto; Japan
65 kg	Momoko Kitade; Japan	Margarita Salnazarian; United World Wrestling	Beyza Nur Akkuş; Turkey
65 kg	Momoko Kitade; Japan	Margarita Salnazarian; United World Wrestling	Iryna Borysiuk; Ukraine
68 kg	Ray Hoshino; Japan	Srishti Janghu; India	Erdenebatyn Odzayaa; Mongolia
68 kg	Ray Hoshino; Japan	Srishti Janghu; India	Eduarda Rodrigues; Brazil
72 kg	Kajal Dhochak; India	Liu Yuqi; China	Kaiyrkul Sharshebaeva; Kyrgyzstan
72 kg	Kajal Dhochak; India	Liu Yuqi; China	Kristina Bratchikova; United World Wrestling
76 kg	Nadiia Sokolovska; Ukraine	Priya Malik; India	Liu Cancan; China
76 kg	Nadiia Sokolovska; Ukraine	Priya Malik; India	Diana Titova; United World Wrestling

== Participating nations ==
648 wrestlers from 56 countries:

- Angola (1)
- Armenia (19)
- Austria (3)
- Azerbaijan (23)
- Bosnia and Herzegovina (1)
- Brazil (5)
- Bulgaria (23) (Host)
- Canada (18)
- Chile (1)
- Croatia (6)
- Czech Republic (3)
- China (30)
- Costa Rica (1)
- Ecuador (1)
- Egypt (6)
- Spain (4)
- Estonia (5)
- Finland (5)
- France (9)
- United Kingdom (1)
- Georgia (20)
- Germany (10)
- Greece (12)
- Hungary (21)
- India (30)
- Iran (20)
- Israel (5)
- Italy (7)
- Japan (30)
- Kazakhstan (29)
- Kyrgyzstan (24)
- South Korea (7)
- Kosovo (3)
- Lithuania (6)
- Morocco (2)
- Moldova (16)
- Mexico (4)
- Mongolia (9)
- North Macedonia (2)
- Netherlands (3)
- Norway (2)
- New Zealand (1)
- Philippines (1)
- Poland (16)
- Puerto Rico (2)
- Romania (11)
- Serbia (8)
- Switzerland (3)
- Slovakia (4)
- Sweden (7)
- Turkmenistan (6)
- Chinese Taipei (5)
- Turkey (30)
- Ukraine (29)
- United States (30)
- Uzbekistan (17)
- United World Wrestling (50)
