= 2024 U20 World Wrestling Championships =

- Host city: Pontevedra, Spain
- Dates: 2–8 September
- Stadium: Pavillón Municipal dos Deportes de Pontevedra

Champions
- Freestyle: United States
- Greco-Roman: Iran
- Women: Japan

The 2024 U20 World Wrestling Championships was the 46th edition of the World Junior Wrestling Championships, which was held in Pontevedra, Spain between 2 and 8 September 2024. Turkmenistan won its first-ever world title in freestyle. Sri Lanka won its first ever medal at a World Wrestling Championships event.

== Competition schedule ==
All times are (UTC+2)

Date	Time	Event
2 September	10.00	Qualification rounds GR – 55-63-77-87-130 kg
2 September	18:00	Semi Finals GR – 55-63-77-87-130 kg
3 September	10.00	Qualification rounds GR – 60-67-72-82-97 kg; Repechages GR – 55-63-77-87-130 kg
3 September	16:45	Semi Finals GR – 60-67-72-82-97 kg
3 September	18:00	Finals GR – 55-63-77-87-130 kg
4 September	10.00	Qualification rounds WW – 50-55-59-68-76 kg; Repechages GR – 60-67-72-82-97 kg
4 September	16:45	Semi Finals WW – 50-55-59-68-76 kg
4 September	18:00	Finals GR – 60-67-72-82-97 kg
5 September	10.00	Qualification rounds WW – 53-57-62-65-72 kg; Repechages WW – 50-55-59-68-76 kg
5 September	16:45	Semi Finals WW – 53-57-62-65-72 kg
5 September	18:00	Finals WW – 50-55-59-68-76 kg
6 September	10.00	Qualification rounds FS – 57-65-70-79-97 kg; Repechages WW – 53-57-62-65-72 kg
6 September	16:45	Semi Finals FS – 57-65-70-79-97 kg
6 September	18:00	Finals WW – 53-57-62-65-72 kg
7 September	10.00	Qualification rounds FS – 61-74-86-92-125 kg; Repechages FS – 57-65-70-79-97 kg
7 September	16:45	Semi Finals FS – 61-74-86-92-125 kg
7 September	18:00	Finals FS – 57-65-70-79-97 kg
8 September	16.00	Repechages FS – 61-74-86-92-125 kg
8 September	18:00	Finals FS – 61-74-86-92-125 kg

== Medal table ==
* Host nation (Spain)

Rank	Nation	Gold	Silver	Bronze	Total
1	Iran	7	2	4	13
–	Individual Neutral Athletes	5	3	7	15
2	Japan	5	2	5	12
3	United States	3	7	6	16
4	Kazakhstan	2	1	4	7
5	China	2	1	2	5
6	Ukraine	2	1	1	4
7	India	1	1	5	7
8	Hungary	1	0	2	3
9	Kyrgyzstan	1	0	1	2
10	Turkmenistan	1	0	0	1
11	Turkey	0	4	6	10
12	Azerbaijan	0	2	4	6
13	Armenia	0	1	1	2
13	Mexico	0	1	1	2
13	Mongolia	0	1	1	2
16	Bulgaria	0	1	0	1
16	Germany	0	1	0	1
16	Spain	0	1	0	1
19	Georgia	0	0	3	3
20	Brazil	0	0	1	1
20	Lithuania	0	0	1	1
20	Poland	0	0	1	1
20	Slovakia	0	0	1	1
20	Sri Lanka	0	0	1	1
20	Sweden	0	0	1	1
20	Switzerland	0	0	1	1
Totals (26 entries)		30	30	60	120

== Team ranking ==
Rank	Men's freestyle		Men's Greco-Roman		Women's freestyle	
Rank	Team	Points	Team	Points	Team	Points
1	United States	175	Iran	147	Japan	149
2	Iran	160	Kazakhstan	100	India	130
3	Japan	95	Turkey	98	United States	101
4	Kazakhstan	86	Armenia	75	China	99
5	Azerbaijan	72	Georgia	66	Ukraine	94
6	India	64	United States	65	Turkey	94
7	Turkey	62	Azerbaijan	63	Mongolia	46
8	Georgia	53	Kyrgyzstan	58	Azerbaijan	43
9	Mongolia	31	Japan	50	Hungary	41
10	Armenia	30	Ukraine	45	Poland	37

== Medalists ==
=== Men's freestyle ===
Event	Gold	Silver	Bronze
57 kg	Luke Lilledahl; United States	Lev Pavlov; Authorised Neutral Athletes	Luka Gvinjilia; Georgia
57 kg	Luke Lilledahl; United States	Lev Pavlov; Authorised Neutral Athletes	Ankush Chandram; India
61 kg	Masanosuke Ono; Japan	Ebrahim Khari; Iran	Bhuvanesh; India
61 kg	Masanosuke Ono; Japan	Ebrahim Khari; Iran	Marcus Blaze; United States
65 kg	Ali Khorramdel; Iran	Makoto Hosokawa; Japan	Bo Bassett; United States
65 kg	Ali Khorramdel; Iran	Makoto Hosokawa; Japan	Adam Arkhiev; Authorised Neutral Athletes
70 kg	Ryoya Yamashita; Japan	Magomed Baituakev; Authorised Neutral Athletes	Ali Karampour; Iran
70 kg	Ryoya Yamashita; Japan	Magomed Baituakev; Authorised Neutral Athletes	PJ Duke; United States
74 kg	Ali Rezaei; Iran	Ladarion Lockett; United States	Aghanazar Novruzov; Azerbaijan
74 kg	Ali Rezaei; Iran	Ladarion Lockett; United States	Shingo Ando; Japan
79 kg	Alp Arslan Begenjow; Turkmenistan	Zack Ryder; United States	Leandro Araújo; Brazil
79 kg	Alp Arslan Begenjow; Turkmenistan	Zack Ryder; United States	Mehdi Yousefi; Iran
86 kg	Ibragim Kadiev; Authorised Neutral Athletes	Josh Barr; United States	Ahmet Yağan; Turkey
86 kg	Ibragim Kadiev; Authorised Neutral Athletes	Josh Barr; United States	Abolfazl Rahmani; Iran
92 kg	Mustafagadzhi Malachdibirov; Authorised Neutral Athletes	Sali Saliev; Bulgaria	Kamil Kurugliyev; Kazakhstan
92 kg	Mustafagadzhi Malachdibirov; Authorised Neutral Athletes	Sali Saliev; Bulgaria	Anar Jafarli; Azerbaijan
97 kg	Rizabek Aitmukhan; Kazakhstan	Khetag Karsanov; Azerbaijan	Justin Rademacher; United States
97 kg	Rizabek Aitmukhan; Kazakhstan	Khetag Karsanov; Azerbaijan	Adam Jakšík; Slovakia
125 kg	Amir Reza Masoumi; Iran	Ben Kueter; United States	Batbayaryn Nambardagva; Mongolia
125 kg	Amir Reza Masoumi; Iran	Ben Kueter; United States	Hakan Büyükçıngıl; Turkey

=== Men's Greco-Roman ===
Event	Gold	Silver	Bronze
55 kg	Ali Ahmadi Vafa; Iran	Isaiah Cortez; United States	Aibek Aitbekov; Kazakhstan
55 kg	Ali Ahmadi Vafa; Iran	Isaiah Cortez; United States	Alibek Amirov; Authorised Neutral Athletes
60 kg	Mohammad Mehdi Gholampour; Iran	Servet Angı; Turkey	Papik Dzhavadian; Authorised Neutral Athletes
60 kg	Mohammad Mehdi Gholampour; Iran	Servet Angı; Turkey	Ongdassyn Khamitov; Kazakhstan
63 kg	Erzu Zakriev; Authorised Neutral Athletes	Otto Black; United States	Erfan Jarkani; Iran
63 kg	Erzu Zakriev; Authorised Neutral Athletes	Otto Black; United States	Yurik Hoveyan; Armenia
67 kg	Ahmad Reza Mohsennejad; Iran	Yussuf Ashrapov; Kazakhstan	Grair Oganesian; Authorised Neutral Athletes
67 kg	Ahmad Reza Mohsennejad; Iran	Yussuf Ashrapov; Kazakhstan	Kojiro Hasegawa; Japan
72 kg	Zaur Beslekoev; Authorised Neutral Athletes	Ashot Khachatryan; Armenia	Ruslan Nurullayev; Azerbaijan
72 kg	Zaur Beslekoev; Authorised Neutral Athletes	Ashot Khachatryan; Armenia	Muhammed Ali Göçmen; Turkey
77 kg	Alireza Abdevali; Iran	Magomed Iarbilov; Authorised Neutral Athletes	Levente Lévai; Hungary
77 kg	Alireza Abdevali; Iran	Magomed Iarbilov; Authorised Neutral Athletes	Tornike Mikeladze; Georgia
82 kg	Islam Yevloyev; Kazakhstan	Alperen Berber; Turkey	Taizo Yoshida; Japan
82 kg	Islam Yevloyev; Kazakhstan	Alperen Berber; Turkey	Zheng Shichang; China
87 kg	Asan Zhanyshov; Kyrgyzstan	Joju Samadov; Azerbaijan	Achiko Bolkvadze; Georgia
87 kg	Asan Zhanyshov; Kyrgyzstan	Joju Samadov; Azerbaijan	Temirlan Turdakyn; Kazakhstan
97 kg	Yehor Yakushenko; Ukraine	Darius Kiefer; Germany	Ahmet Eremekter; Turkey
97 kg	Yehor Yakushenko; Ukraine	Darius Kiefer; Germany	Anatolii Averin; Authorised Neutral Athletes
130 kg	László Darabos; Hungary	Abolfazl Fathi Tazangi; Iran	Aden Attao; United States
130 kg	László Darabos; Hungary	Abolfazl Fathi Tazangi; Iran	Samagan Ormonov; Kyrgyzstan

=== Women's freestyle ===
Event	Gold	Silver	Bronze
50 kg	Zhang Yu; China	Haruna Morikawa; Japan	Svenja Jungo; Switzerland
50 kg	Zhang Yu; China	Haruna Morikawa; Japan	Aida Kerymova; Ukraine
53 kg	Zhang Jin; China	Carla Jaume; Spain	Nethmi Poruthotage; Sri Lanka
53 kg	Zhang Jin; China	Carla Jaume; Spain	Saki Yumiya; Japan
55 kg	Cristelle Rodriguez; United States	Byambasürengiin Khaliun; Mongolia	Tuba Demir; Turkey
55 kg	Cristelle Rodriguez; United States	Byambasürengiin Khaliun; Mongolia	Nargiz Samadova; Azerbaijan
57 kg	Sowaka Uchida; Japan	Bertha Rojas; Mexico	Marta Hetmanava; Authorised Neutral Athletes
57 kg	Sowaka Uchida; Japan	Bertha Rojas; Mexico	Neha Sangwan; India
59 kg	Sakura Onishi; Japan	Alexis Janiak; United States	Anna Tieliegina; Lithuania
59 kg	Sakura Onishi; Japan	Alexis Janiak; United States	Komal; India
62 kg	Iryna Bondar; Ukraine	Nitika; India	Melanie Jiménez; Mexico
62 kg	Iryna Bondar; Ukraine	Nitika; India	Nagisa Ito; Japan
65 kg	Nana Ikehata; Japan	Beyza Nur Akkuş; Turkey	Margarita Salnazarian; Authorised Neutral Athletes
65 kg	Nana Ikehata; Japan	Beyza Nur Akkuş; Turkey	Rui Zaixue; China
68 kg	Alina Shevchenko; Authorised Neutral Athletes	Ayşe Erkan; Turkey	Karolina Domaszuk; Poland
68 kg	Alina Shevchenko; Authorised Neutral Athletes	Ayşe Erkan; Turkey	Srishti Janghu; India
72 kg	Jasmine Robinson; United States	Liu Yuqi; China	Elvira Ersson; Sweden
72 kg	Jasmine Robinson; United States	Liu Yuqi; China	Noémi Osváth-Nagy; Hungary
76 kg	Jyoti Berwal; India	Mariia Orlevych; Ukraine	Naomi Simon; United States
76 kg	Jyoti Berwal; India	Mariia Orlevych; Ukraine	Elmira Yasin; Turkey

== Participating nations ==
650 wrestlers from 56 countries:

1. Algeria (2)
2. Angola (2)
3. Armenia (17)
4. Australia (4)
5. Austria (2)
6. Azerbaijan (25)
7. Belgium (2)
8. Brazil (5)
9. Bulgaria (8)
10. Canada (13)
11. China (28)
12. Cape Verde (1)
13. Croatia (5)
14. Czech Republic (6)
15. Egypt (10)
16. Spain (23) (Host)
17. Estonia (5)
18. Finland (4)
19. France (7)
20. Georgia (20)
21. Germany (9)
22. Greece (12)
23. Hungary (17)
24. Individual Neutral Athletes (48)
25. India (30)
26. Iran (20)
27. Israel (2)
28. Italy (6)
29. Japan (30)
30. Kazakhstan (29)
31. Kyrgyzstan (23)
32. South Korea (10)
33. Kosovo (1)
34. Saudi Arabia (3)
35. Latvia (1)
36. Lithuania (4)
37. Moldova (18)
38. Mexico (9)
39. Mongolia (11)
40. New Zealand (1)
41. Panama (2)
42. Poland (19)
43. Puerto Rico (8)
44. Romania (5)
45. South Africa (1)
46. Serbia (11)
47. Sri Lanka (2)
48. Switzerland (5)
49. Slovakia (6)
50. Sweden (8)
51. Tajikistan (1)
52. Turkmenistan (5)
53. Chinese Taipei (6)
54. Turkey (30)
55. Ukraine (30)
56. United States (30)
57. Venezuela (1)
