= 2025 U23 World Wrestling Championships =

- Host city: Novi Sad, Serbia
- Dates: 20-27 October
- Stadium: SPC Vojvodina

Champions
- Freestyle: United States
- Greco-Roman: Iran
- Women: India

The 2025 U23 World Wrestling Championships will be the ninth edition of the U23 World Wrestling Championships of combined events and it will held from 20 to 27 October 2025 in Novi Sad, Serbia.

== Competition schedule ==
All times are (UTC+2:00) (20-25 October) and (UTC+1:00) (26-27 October)

Date	Time	Event
20 October	10.00-14.30	Qualification rounds: GR – 63-77-87-130 kg
20 October	18:00-19.30	Semi-finals: GR – 63-77-87-130 kg
21 October	10.30-15.30	Qualification rounds: GR 55-67-72-97 kg; Repechage: GR – 63-77-87-130 kg
21 October	16.45-17.45	Semi-finals: GR 55-67-72-97 kg
21 October	18.00-20.30	Finals: GR – 63-77-87-130 kg
22 October	10.30-13.30	Qualification rounds: GR 60-82 kg WW 50-72-76 kg; Repechage: GR 55-67-72-97 kg
22 October	16.45-17.45	Semi-finals: GR 60-82 kg WW 50-72-76 kg
22 October	18.00-21.00	Finals: GR 55-67-72-97 kg
23 October	10.30-13.30	Qualification rounds: WW 55-57-65-68 kg; Repechage: GR 60-82 kg WW 50-72-76 kg
23 October	16.45-17.45	Semi-finals: WW 55-57-65-68 kg
23 October	18.00-20.30	Finals: GR 60-82 kg WW 50-72-76 kg
24 October	10.30-15.30	Qualification rounds: FS 74-92 kg WW 53-59-62 kg; Repechage: WW 55-57-65-68 kg
24 October	16.45-17.45	Semi-finals: FS 74-92 kg WW 53-59-62 kg
24 October	18.00-20.30	Finals: WW 55-57-65-68 kg
25 October	10.30-15.30	Qualification rounds: FS 57-70-79-125 kg; Repechage: FS 74-92 kg WW 53-59-62 kg
25 October	16.45-17.45	Semi-finals: FS 57-70-79-125 kg
25 October	18.00-21.00	Finals: FS 74-92 kg WW 53-59-62 kg
26 October	10.30-15.30	Qualification rounds: FS 61-65-86-97 kg; Repechage: FS 57-70-79-125 kg
26 October	16.45-17.45	Semi-finals: FS 61-65-86-97 kg
26 October	18.00-21.00	Finals: FS 57-70-79-125 kg
27 October	16.00-17.45	Repechage: FS 61-65-86-97 kg
27 October	18:00-20.30	Finals: FS 61-65-86-97 kg

== Medal table ==
* Host nation (Serbia)

Rank	Nation	Gold	Silver	Bronze	Total
1	Japan	6	1	3	10
2	Iran	5	2	5	12
3	United States	5	2	4	11
4	Azerbaijan	3	1	3	7
–	United World Wrestling	2	5	7	14
5	Ukraine	2	3	2	7
6	Turkey	1	3	3	7
7	India	1	2	6	9
8	Moldova	1	2	2	5
9	Kazakhstan	1	1	3	5
10	Kyrgyzstan	1	1	2	4
11	China	1	1	0	2
12	Egypt	1	0	1	2
13	Georgia	0	3	1	4
14	Uzbekistan	0	2	4	6
15	Armenia	0	1	1	2
16	Cuba	0	0	2	2
16	Germany	0	0	2	2
16	Hungary	0	0	2	2
16	Nigeria	0	0	2	2
20	Bahrain	0	0	1	1
20	Croatia	0	0	1	1
20	Estonia	0	0	1	1
20	Mongolia	0	0	1	1
20	Spain	0	0	1	1
Totals (24 entries)		30	30	60	120

== Team ranking ==
Rank	Men's freestyle		Men's Greco-Roman		Women's freestyle	
Rank	Team	Points	Team	Points	Team	Points
1	United States	137	Iran	143	India	121
2	Iran	127	Ukraine	96	Japan	117
3	Japan	85	Azerbaijan	93	United States	106
4	Azerbaijan	84	Georgia	81	Turkey	88
5	Turkey	70	Uzbekistan	72	Ukraine	78
6	India	61	Kazakhstan	72	China	65
7	Georgia	54	Armenia	71	Kyrgyzstan	50
8	Moldova	51	Moldova	64	Germany	37
9	Uzbekistan	50	Egypt	40	Kazakhstan	33
10	Ukraine	50	United States	40	Nigeria	30

== Medal summary ==
=== Men's freestyle ===
Event	Gold	Silver	Bronze
57 kg	Luke Lilledahl; United States	Yuta Kikuchi; Japan	Nodirbek Jumanazarov; Uzbekistan
57 kg	Luke Lilledahl; United States	Yuta Kikuchi; Japan	Milad Valizadeh; Iran
61 kg	Jax Forrest; United States	Omurbek Asan Uulu; Kyrgyzstan	Tolga Özbek; Turkey
61 kg	Jax Forrest; United States	Omurbek Asan Uulu; Kyrgyzstan	Akito Mukaida; Japan
65 kg	Sujeet Kalkal; India	Umidjon Jalolov; Uzbekistan	Bashir Magomedov; United World Wrestling
65 kg	Sujeet Kalkal; India	Umidjon Jalolov; Uzbekistan	Bilol Sharip Uulu; Kyrgyzstan
70 kg	Kanan Heybatov; Azerbaijan	Sina Khalili; Iran	PJ Duke; United States
70 kg	Kanan Heybatov; Azerbaijan	Sina Khalili; Iran	Alexandr Gaidarli; Moldova
74 kg	Mitchell Mesenbrink; United States	Muhammed Ozmuş; Turkey	Manuel Wagin; Germany
74 kg	Mitchell Mesenbrink; United States	Muhammed Ozmuş; Turkey	Yoshinosuke Aoyagi; Japan
79 kg	Levi Haines; United States	Metehan Yaprak; Turkey	Geannis Garzón; Cuba
79 kg	Levi Haines; United States	Metehan Yaprak; Turkey	Mehdi Yousefi; Iran
86 kg	Arsen Balaian; United World Wrestling	Eugeniu Mihalcean; Moldova	Abolfazl Rahmani; Iran
86 kg	Arsen Balaian; United World Wrestling	Eugeniu Mihalcean; Moldova	Ali Tcokaev; Azerbaijan
92 kg	Mohammad Mobin Azimi; Iran	Mukhamed-Takhir Khaniev; United World Wrestling	Magomed Sharipov; Bahrain
92 kg	Mohammad Mobin Azimi; Iran	Mukhamed-Takhir Khaniev; United World Wrestling	Sherzod Poyonov; Uzbekistan
97 kg	Arash Yoshida; Japan	Merab Suleimanishvili; Georgia	Soslan Dzhagaev; United World Wrestling
97 kg	Arash Yoshida; Japan	Merab Suleimanishvili; Georgia	Rizabek Aitmukhan; Kazakhstan
125 kg	Abolfazl Mohammadnejad; Iran	Khetag Karsanov; Azerbaijan	Khabib Davudgadzhiev; United World Wrestling
125 kg	Abolfazl Mohammadnejad; Iran	Khetag Karsanov; Azerbaijan	Hakan Büyükçıngıl; Turkey

=== Men's Greco-Roman ===
Event	Gold	Silver	Bronze
55 kg	Elmir Aliyev; Azerbaijan	Alibek Amirov; United World Wrestling	Khojiakbar Kuchkarov; Uzbekistan
55 kg	Elmir Aliyev; Azerbaijan	Alibek Amirov; United World Wrestling	Vishvajit More; India
60 kg	Koto Gomi; Japan	Sajjad Abbaspour; Iran	Suren Aghajanyan; Armenia
60 kg	Koto Gomi; Japan	Sajjad Abbaspour; Iran	Mehroj Bakhramov; Uzbekistan
63 kg	Ziya Babashov; Azerbaijan	Vitalie Eriomenco; Moldova	Dordzhi Shungurtsikov; United World Wrestling
63 kg	Ziya Babashov; Azerbaijan	Vitalie Eriomenco; Moldova	Adham El-Sayed; Egypt
67 kg	Mohamed Abdelrehim; Egypt	Anri Khozrevanidze; Georgia	Ahmad Reza Mohsennejad; Iran
67 kg	Mohamed Abdelrehim; Egypt	Anri Khozrevanidze; Georgia	Otto Black; United States
72 kg	Iman Mohammadi; Iran	Abror Atabaev; Uzbekistan	Ruslan Nurullayev; Azerbaijan
72 kg	Iman Mohammadi; Iran	Abror Atabaev; Uzbekistan	Merey Maulitkanov; Kazakhstan
77 kg	Irfan Mirzoiev; Ukraine	Temuri Orjonikidze; Georgia	Alexandru Solovei; Moldova
77 kg	Irfan Mirzoiev; Ukraine	Temuri Orjonikidze; Georgia	Levente Lévai; Hungary
82 kg	Alexandrin Guțu; Moldova	Ruslan Abdiiev; Ukraine	Omar Satayev; Kazakhstan
82 kg	Alexandrin Guțu; Moldova	Ruslan Abdiiev; Ukraine	Abolfazl Mohmedi; Iran
87 kg	Gholamreza Farrokhi; Iran	Ivan Chmyr; Ukraine	Payton Jacobson; United States
87 kg	Gholamreza Farrokhi; Iran	Ivan Chmyr; Ukraine	Achiko Bolkvadze; Georgia
97 kg	Yehor Yakushenko; Ukraine	Iussuf Matsiyev; Kazakhstan	Richard Karelson; Estonia
97 kg	Yehor Yakushenko; Ukraine	Iussuf Matsiyev; Kazakhstan	Maksim Averin; United World Wrestling
130 kg	Fardin Hedayati; Iran	Razmik Kurdyan; Armenia	László Darabos; Hungary
130 kg	Fardin Hedayati; Iran	Razmik Kurdyan; Armenia	Aleksandr Melekhov; United World Wrestling

=== Women's freestyle ===
Event	Gold	Silver	Bronze
50 kg	Liang Jinyue; China	Audrey Jimenez; United States	Aida Kerymova; Ukraine
50 kg	Liang Jinyue; China	Audrey Jimenez; United States	Mönkhbatyn Mönkhgerel; Mongolia
53 kg	Haruna Morikawa; Japan	Hansika Lamba; India	Christianah Ogunsanya; Nigeria
53 kg	Haruna Morikawa; Japan	Hansika Lamba; India	Carla Jaume; Spain
55 kg	Shugyla Omirbek; Kazakhstan	Tuba Demir; Turkey	Amory Andrich; Germany
55 kg	Shugyla Omirbek; Kazakhstan	Tuba Demir; Turkey	Nishu Bhanwala; India
57 kg	Akari Fujinami; Japan	Aryna Martynava; United World Wrestling	Neha Sharma; India
57 kg	Akari Fujinami; Japan	Aryna Martynava; United World Wrestling	Yaynelis Sanz; Cuba
59 kg	Ruka Natami; Japan	Sarika Malik; India	Hiunai Hurbanova; Azerbaijan
59 kg	Ruka Natami; Japan	Sarika Malik; India	Alexis Janiak; United States
62 kg	Sakura Motoki; Japan	Iryna Bondar; Ukraine	Esther Kolawole; Nigeria
62 kg	Sakura Motoki; Japan	Iryna Bondar; Ukraine	Yana Tretsiak; United World Wrestling
65 kg	Elizaveta Petliakova; United World Wrestling	Rao Yuqi; China	Oleksandra Rybak; Ukraine
65 kg	Elizaveta Petliakova; United World Wrestling	Rao Yuqi; China	Pulkit Kandola; India
68 kg	Nesrin Baş; Turkey	Alina Shevchenko; United World Wrestling	Srishti Janghu; India
68 kg	Nesrin Baş; Turkey	Alina Shevchenko; United World Wrestling	Gulnura Tashtanbekova; Kyrgyzstan
72 kg	Nurzat Nurtaeva; Kyrgyzstan	Jasmine Robinson; United States	Veronika Vilk; Croatia
72 kg	Nurzat Nurtaeva; Kyrgyzstan	Jasmine Robinson; United States	Mahiro Yoshitake; Japan
76 kg	Kylie Welker; United States	Valeriia Trifonova; United World Wrestling	Elmira Yasin; Turkey
76 kg	Kylie Welker; United States	Valeriia Trifonova; United World Wrestling	Priya Malik; India

== Participating nations ==
685 wrestlers from 57 countries:

1. Albania (9)
2. Armenia (20)
3. Australia (1)
4. Austria (2)
5. Azerbaijan (27)
6. Belgium (3)
7. Brazil (1)
8. Bahrain (2)
9. Bulgaria (22)
10. Canada (19)
11. Chile (3)
12. China (30)
13. Croatia (3)
14. Cuba (5)
15. Czech Republic (5)
16. Denmark (4)
17. Ecuador (1)
18. Egypt (10)
19. Spain (6)
20. Estonia (4)
21. Finland (5)
22. France (6)
23. Georgia (20)
24. Germany (14)
25. Greece (7)
26. Hungary (13)
27. India (29)
28. Iran (20)
29. Israel (5)
30. Italy (14)
31. Japan (30)
32. Kazakhstan (30)
33. Kyrgyzstan (23)
34. Lithuania (6)
35. Moldova (21)
36. Mexico (18)
37. Mongolia (4)
38. North Macedonia (3)
39. Netherlands (1)
40. Nigeria (3)
41. Norway (2)
42. Poland (17)
43. Romania (8)
44. South Africa (1)
45. Sierra Leone (3)
46. Serbia (12) (Host)
47. Sri Lanka (1)
48. Switzerland (2)
49. Slovakia (2)
50. Sweden (4)
51. Turkmenistan (3)
52. Tunisia (5)
53. Turkey (30)
54. Ukraine (30)
55. United States (30)
56. Uzbekistan (24)
57. Venezuela (8)
58. United World Wrestling (Russia+Belarus) (49)
