= Ben Kueter =

American football player and wrestler

Personal information
- Full name: Benjamin Allen Kueter
- Nationality: American
- Born: July 6, 2004 (age 22) Iowa City, Iowa, U.S.
- Height: 6 ft 3 in (191 cm)
- Weight: 220 lb (100 kg)

Sport
- Country: United States
- Sport: Wrestling
- Events: Freestyle and Folkstyle
- Club: Hawkeye Wrestling Club
- Coached by: Tom Brands; Terry Brands
Medal record
Men's freestyle wrestling
Representing the United States
U20 World Championships
Silver medal – second place	2024 Pontevedra	125 kg
Gold medal – first place	2022 Sofia	97 kg
Big Ten Championships
Bronze medal – third place	2025 Evanston	285 lb

Ben Kueter
No. 32 – Iowa Hawkeyes
- Position: Linebacker
- Class: (redshirt) Freshman

Personal information
- Listed height: 6 ft 3 in (1.91 m)
- Listed weight: 225 lb (102 kg)

Career information
- High school: Iowa City (Iowa City, Iowa)
- College: Iowa (2023–present)
- Stats at ESPN

Ben Allen Kueter (born June 6, 2004) is an American freestyle and folkstyle wrestler, and a former college football linebacker for the Iowa Hawkeyes.

In wrestling, Kueter was the 2022 U20 World champion at 97 kilograms, and a silver medalist at 125 kilograms in the 2024 edition.

== Early life ==
A three-sport student-athlete at Iowa City High School, Kueter played American football, baseball and wrestled.

In wrestling, Kueter was an undefeated four-time IHSAA state champion, recording an 111–0 record throughout four years of varsity. Entering his senior year in 2022, he won a U20 US National championship in freestyle, and followed it up by securing the U20 World championship at 97 kilograms.

In football, Kueter was the team captain all four years, and he was rated a three-star recruit as a linebacker coming out of high school.

A junior in 2021, he committed to the University of Iowa as both a football player and a wrestler.

== Wrestling career ==
=== University of Iowa ===
==== 2023–2024 ====
Kueter wore a redshirt in his first year at Iowa, recording a 3–1 record and earning two ranked wins.

==== 2024–2025 ====
In June 2024, Kueter became the champion at the U20 US World Team Trials up at 125 kilograms. He then announced he would take a 10-month break from football to focus in wrestling. In September, Kueter earned the silver medal at the U20 World Championships.

== Football career ==
=== University of Iowa ===
==== 2023–2024 ====
In his freshman season at Iowa, Kueter did not compete in any games.
