= Alexandr Gaidarli =

Moldovan freestyle wrestler

Personal information
- Born: 2004 or 2005 (age 21–22)

Sport
- Country: Moldova
- Sport: Amateur wrestling
- Event: Freestyle wrestling
Medal record
Men's freestyle wrestling
Representing Moldova
European Championships
Silver medal – second place	2026 Tirana	70 kg
World U23 Championships
Bronze medal – third place	2025 Novi Sad	70 kg
Bronze medal – third place	2026 Las Vegas	70 kg
European U23 Championships
Gold medal – first place	2026 Zrenjanin	70 kg
World U20 Championships
Silver medal – second place	2025 Samokov	70 kg
Silver medal – second place	2026 Bratislava	70 kg
European U20 Championships
Silver medal – second place	2024 Novi Sad	70 kg

Alexandr Gaidarli (born 2004/2005) is a Moldovan freestyle wrestler. He competed at the 2026 European Wrestling Championships, winning the silver medal in the 70 kg event.
