= Ankush Chandram =

Indian freestyle wrestler

Personal information
- Nationality: Indian
- Born: 26 February 2007 (age 19)

Sport
- Sport: Freestyle wrestling
- Weight class: 57 kg
Medal record
Freestyle wrestling
Representing India
U17 World Wrestling Championships
Silver medal – second place	2023 Istanbul	55 kg
U20 Asian Wrestling Championships
Gold medal – first place	2024 Si Racha	57 kg
Gold medal – first place	2025 Bishkek	57 kg
U20 World Wrestling Championships
Bronze medal – third place	2024 Pontevedra	57 kg
Asian Wrestling Championships
Bronze medal – third place	2026 Bishkek	57 kg

Ankush Chandram (born 26 February 2007) is an Indian freestyle wrestler who competes in the 57 kg weight category. He won a silver medal at the 2023 U17 World Wrestling Championships and a bronze medal at the 2024 U20 World Wrestling Championships. In 2026, Chandram competed for Haryana Thunders in the Pro Wrestling League.

== Early life ==
Ankush was born on 26 February 2007. His father's name is Shree Chandram.

== Career ==
Chandram competed in the 55 kg freestyle category at the 2023 U17 World Wrestling Championships in Istanbul, reaching the final before losing 4–3 to Marcus Blaze of the United States and winning the silver medal.

In 2024, Chandram won the 57 kg gold medal at the 2024 U20 Asian Wrestling Championships in Si Racha, Thailand, defeating Asadbek Saidturaev 4–2 in the final.

Later in 2024, he won bronze in the 57 kg category at the 2024 U20 World Wrestling Championships in Pontevedra, Spain. He defeated Hayko Gasparyan 6–2 in the bronze-medal bout.

In April 2025, Chandram won the 57 kg title at the Under-20 National Wrestling Championship in Kota, representing Delhi. In July, he won the 57 kg gold medal at the 2025 U20 Asian Wrestling Championships in Bishkek, defeating Nurdanat Aitanov 7–4 in the final.

He was acquired by Haryana Thunders for ₹24.5 lakh in the league's auction and competed in the men's 57 kg category. During the league season, he recorded victories over Chirag Chhikara and Shubham Kaushik and defeated Sumit Malik 11–5.

In April 2026, Chandram won the bronze medal in the senior 57 kg category at the 2026 Asian Wrestling Championships in Bishkek. He defeated Gayan Kathurangana Ekanayaka in the qualification round and then lost to Milad Valizadeh in the quarterfinal. He defeated Fuga Sasaki of Japan 8–2 in the bronze-medal bout to win his first senior Asian medal.
