= Ladarion Lockett =

American wrestler (born 2006)

Personal information
- Full name: Ladarion Artez Lockett
- Nationality: American
- Born: January 9, 2006 (age 20) Stillwater, Oklahoma, U.S.
- Weight: 74 kg (163 lb)

Sport
- Country: United States
- Sport: Wrestling
- Events: Freestyle and Folkstyle
- Club: Cowboy Regional Training Center
- Coached by: David Taylor
Medal record
Men's freestyle wrestling
Representing the United States
Pan American Championships
Gold medal – first place	2025 Monterrey	74 kg
U20 World Championships
Silver medal – second place	2024 Pontevedra	74 kg
U17 World Championships
Gold medal – first place	2023 Istanbul	71 kg
U20 Pan American Championships
Gold medal – first place	2024 Lima	74 kg

Ladarion Artez Lockett (born January 9, 2006) is an American freestyle and folkstyle wrestler who competes at 74 kilograms. In freestyle, he won gold medals at the 2025 Pan American Championships and the 2023 U17 World Championships, as well as a silver medal at the 2024 U20 World Championships.

== Career ==
=== High school ===
Born and raised in Stillwater, Oklahoma, Lockett was a four-time OSSAA state champion out of Stillwater High School, where he graduated from in 2025 as the top-ranked wrestler at 165 pounds. In 2023, Lockett became the U17 World champion at 71 kilograms in freestyle. By the end of the same year, he committed to wrestle at the Oklahoma State University.

==== 2024 ====
In April 2024, Lockett made his senior level debut at the 2024 US Olympic Team Trials at 74 kilograms, having qualified by his gold medal performance at the 2023 U17 World Championships. After a victory over 70 kg U20 World champion Meyer Shapiro, Lockett fell to 74 kg U20 World champion Mitchell Mesenbrink and Pan American Games champion Tyler Berger back-to-back.

After claiming the U20 US World Team spot in June, Lockett made his way to a silver medal at the U20 World Championships in September, becoming a two-time age group World finalist.

==== 2025 ====
In May, Lockett made his international senior level debut at the Pan American Championships, where he became the champion after three wins over foreign opposition, including Olympian Anthony Montero from Venezuela. In the semifinals, he defeated 2025 U23 Pan American champion Geannis Garzon from Cuba by disqualification, after a spike by the latter.

== Freestyle record ==
Senior Freestyle Matches
Res.	Record	Opponent	Score	Date	Event	Location
Loss	4-3	(China) Lu Feng	TF 3-14	July 31, 2025	Cowboy RTC vs China	(United States) Stillwater, Oklahoma
2025 Pan American Championships (gold) at 74 kg
Win	4–2	(Venezuela) Anthony Montero	TF 11–0	May 10, 2025	2025 Pan American Championships	Monterrey, Mexico
Win	3–2	(Cuba) Geannis Garzon	DSQ (3–2)	May 10, 2025	2025 Pan American Championships	Monterrey, Mexico
Win	2–2	(Canada) Adam Thomson	TF 11–0	May 10, 2025	2025 Pan American Championships	Monterrey, Mexico
2024 US Olympic Team Trials DNP at 74 kg
Loss	1–2	(United States) Tyler Berger	4–6	April 19, 2024	2024 US Olympic Team Trials	(United States) State College, Pennsylvania
Win	—N/a	(United States) Vincenzo Joseph	FF	April 19, 2024	2024 US Olympic Team Trials	(United States) State College, Pennsylvania
Loss	1–1	(United States) Mitchell Mesenbrink	TF 3–13	April 19, 2024	2024 US Olympic Team Trials	(United States) State College, Pennsylvania
Win	1–0	(United States) Meyer Shapiro	TF 12–1	April 19, 2024	2024 US Olympic Team Trials	(United States) State College, Pennsylvania
