= U23 World Wrestling Championships =

International wrestling event

- Status: Active
- Genre: U23 Wrestling Championships
- Date: October to November
- Frequency: Annual
- Location: Various
- Years active: 2017–present
- Inaugurated: 2017
- Previous event: Las Vegas 2026 (United States)
- Organiser: United World Wrestling
- 2026 U23 World Wrestling Championships

The U23 World Wrestling Championships are the Wrestling World Championship for athletes under 23 years old and is organized by United World Wrestling. The tournament began in 2017.

== Editions ==
Edition	Year	Host city	Host country	Dates	Events	Winners		
Edition	Year	Host city	Host country	Dates	Events	Men's freestyle	Men's Greco-Roman	Women's freestyle
1	2017	Bydgoszcz	Poland	21–26 November	24	Russia	Georgia	Japan
2	2018	Bucharest	Romania	12–18 November	30	Russia	Georgia	Japan
3	2019	Budapest	Hungary	28 October - 3 November	30	Russia	Iran	Japan
—N/a	2020	Tampere	Finland	Did not happen due to COVID-19 pandemic				
4	2021	Belgrade	Serbia	1–7 November	30	Russia	Russia	Russia
5	2022	Pontevedra	Spain	17–23 October	30	Georgia	Iran	Japan
6	2023	Tirana	Albania	23–29 October	30	United States	Turkey	Japan
7	2024	Tirana	Albania	21–27 October	30	Iran	Iran	United States
8	2025	Novi Sad	Serbia	20–26 October	30	United States	Iran	India
9	2026	Las Vegas	United States	12–18 October	30	Iran	Iran	Ukraine

== Team rankings ==
Year	Men's Freestyle			Men's Greco-Roman			Women's Freestyle		
Year	1	2	3	1	2	3	1	2	3
2017	Russia	Kazakhstan	Georgia	Georgia	Russia	Turkey	Japan	Ukraine	Russia
2018	Russia	Georgia	Iran	Georgia	Russia	Turkey	Japan	Russia	China
2019	Russia	Iran	Azerbaijan	Iran	Georgia	Russia	Japan	China	Ukraine
2021	Russia	Iran	Armenia	Russia	Iran	Georgia	Russia	Ukraine	India
2022	Georgia	Iran	United States	Iran	Georgia	Turkey	Japan	United States	Ukraine
2023	United States	Turkey	Azerbaijan	Turkey	Azerbaijan	Georgia	Japan	Ukraine	United World Wrestling
2024	Iran	Japan	Azerbaijan	Iran	Georgia	Armenia	United States	Japan	Ukraine
2025	United States	Iran	Japan	Iran	Ukraine	Azerbaijan	India	Japan	United States
2026	Iran	Russia	United States	Iran	Kazakhstan	Russia	Ukraine	United States	Japan

== Team titles ==
Country	FS	GR	FW	Total
Iran	2	5	0	7
Russia	4	1	1	6
Japan	0	0	5	5
Georgia	1	2	0	3
United States	2	0	1	3
India	0	0	1	1
Turkey	0	1	0	1
Ukraine	0	0	1	1

== All time medal table (2017-2026) ==
As of 2026 U23 World Wrestling Championships

Rank	Nation	Gold	Silver	Bronze	Total
1	Japan	48	18	35	101
2	Iran	35	12	46	93
3	Russia	25	26	28	79
4	United States	21	19	22	62
5	Georgia	17	16	25	58
–	Individual Neutral Athletes (Note: As a result of sanctions imposed following the 2022 Russian invasion of Ukraine, wrestlers from Russia and Belarus were not permitted to use the name, flag, or anthem of Russia or Belarus. They instead participated as Individual Neutral Athletes (Athlètes Individuels Neutres in French) according to an IOC decision implemented by the UWW. No flags at all were used for these delegations, not even the UWW flag. The UWW does not include the medals won by these wrestlers in the official medal table, they results were not counted in the team rankings.)	16	9	19	44
6	Ukraine	13	15	46	74
7	Turkey	12	18	41	71
8	Azerbaijan	10	22	31	63
9	Moldova	8	10	14	32
10	Kazakhstan	6	8	23	37
11	Armenia	6	8	12	26
12	China	5	9	10	24
13	Kyrgyzstan	5	7	13	25
14	Hungary	5	4	10	19
15	Cuba	4	1	5	10
16	Egypt	4	0	4	8
17	India	3	14	24	41
18	United World Wrestling (Note: As a result of sanctions by the UWW imposed on the Wrestling Federation of India for not conducting its elections on time, wrestlers from India were not permitted to use the name, flag, or anthem of India. They instead participated under the name and the flag of the United World Wrestling (UWW) in 2023 U23 World Wrestling Championships and Russia in 2025 U23 World Wrestling Championships. UWW - 2023: India 1,2,6 - 2025: Russia/Belarus 2,5,7)	3	7	13	23
19	Belarus	2	5	7	14
20	Canada	2	4	5	11
21	France	2	2	2	6
22	Norway	2	0	1	3
23	Romania	1	3	9	13
24	Poland	1	3	7	11
25	Uzbekistan	1	2	4	7
26	Germany	1	1	13	15
27	Sweden	1	1	5	7
28	Finland	1	1	2	4
29	Colombia	1	1	1	3
29	Greece	1	1	1	3
31	Ecuador	1	1	0	2
31	Slovakia	1	1	0	2
33	Croatia	0	5	2	7
34	Mongolia	0	2	17	19
35	Bulgaria	0	2	1	3
36	Mexico	0	1	2	3
37	Austria	0	1	1	2
37	Netherlands	0	1	1	2
37	Serbia	0	1	1	2
40	Denmark	0	1	0	1
40	Switzerland	0	1	0	1
42	Italy	0	0	4	4
42	Nigeria	0	0	4	4
44	Lithuania	0	0	3	3
45	Estonia	0	0	2	2
45	Israel	0	0	2	2
45	Latvia	0	0	2	2
45	Spain	0	0	2	2
49	Bahrain	0	0	1	1
49	Chinese Taipei	0	0	1	1
49	Czech Republic	0	0	1	1
49	Tunisia	0	0	1	1
49	Turkmenistan	0	0	1	1
49	Venezuela	0	0	1	1
Totals (54 entries)		264	264	528	1,056

== See also ==
- Wrestling World Cup
- World Wrestling Championships
- U20 World Wrestling Championships
- U17 World Wrestling Championships
- World Wrestling Clubs Cup
- World Beach Wrestling Championships
- List of Cadet, Junior, Espoir and U-23 World Champions in men's Greco-Roman wrestling
- List of Cadet, Junior, and Espoir World Champions in men's freestyle wrestling
- World Junior Wrestling Championships
- List of World Championships medalists in wrestling (freestyle)
- List of World Championships medalists in wrestling (Greco-Roman)
- List of World Championships medalists in wrestling (women)
- List of World and Olympic Champions in Greco-Roman wrestling
- List of World and Olympic Champions in men's freestyle wrestling
