= 2023 World Junior Wrestling Championships – Men's freestyle =

The men's freestyle competitions at the 2023 World Junior Wrestling Championships held in Amman, Jordan between 14 and 16 August 2023.

== Men's freestyle ==
=== 57 kg ===
14 and 15 August

Legend

- F — Won by fall

Final

Final
Yuto Nishiuchi (JPN)	5
Luke Lilledahl (USA)	0

Top half

Round of 32
Xie Congbao (CHN)	0
Luka Gvinjilia (GEO)	10

Round of 16
Herbert Akapian (ANA)	6
Vasile Marcu (MDA)	1
Luka Gvinjilia (GEO)	6
Sagar (IND)	9
Nodirbek Jumanazarov (UZB)	1
Yuto Nishiuchi (JPN)	6
Amir Hamaýun (TKM)	1
Bakytbek Duishenbekov (KGZ)	6

Quarterfinals
Herbert Akapian (ANA)	5
Sagar (IND)	15
Yuto Nishiuchi (JPN)	2^{F}
Bakytbek Duishenbekov (KGZ)	0

Semifinals
Sagar (IND)	0
Yuto Nishiuchi (JPN)	10

Bottom half

Round of 32
Ruslan Solovei (UKR)	0
Merey Bazarbayev (KAZ)	10
Lev Pavlov (ANA)	2
Luke Lilledahl (USA)	9

Round of 16
Ruslan Abdullayev (AZE)	10
David Kiefer (GER)	0
Merey Bazarbayev (KAZ)	1
Ahmad Javan (IRI)	6
Tolga Özbek (TUR)	1
Luke Lilledahl (USA)	6
Rafał Szewc (POL)	0
Edik Harutyunyan (ARM)	10

Quarterfinals
Ruslan Abdullayev (AZE)	3^{F}
Ahmad Javan (IRI)	1
Luke Lilledahl (USA)	8
Edik Harutyunyan (ARM)	3

Semifinals
Ruslan Abdullayev (AZE)	9
Luke Lilledahl (USA)	7^{F}

Repechage round 1
Lev Pavlov (ANA)	5
Tolga Özbek (TUR)	1

Repechage round 2
Nodirbek Jumanazarov (UZB)	2
Bakytbek Duishenbekov (KGZ)	2
Lev Pavlov (ANA)	3
Edik Harutyunyan (ARM)	6

Bronze medal match
Nodirbek Jumanazarov (UZB)	10
Sagar (IND)	0
Edik Harutyunyan (ARM)	8
Ruslan Abdullayev (AZE)	4

=== 61 kg ===
15 and 16 August

Legend

- F — Won by fall

Final

Final
Eldar Akhmadudinov (ANA)	8
Mohit Kumar (IND)	9

Top half

Round of 32
Levik Mikaelyan (ARM)	15
Suhib Al-Marafi (JOR)	4
Marc Arias (ESP)	0
Ali Khorramdel (IRI)	12
Nurýagdy Baýramdurdyýew (TKM)	1
Tamazi Sulamanidze (GEO)	11
Benjamin Boejthe (ROU)	1
Eldar Akhmadudinov (ANA)	12

Round of 16
Azizbek Naimov (UZB)	1
Levik Mikaelyan (ARM)	3
Ali Khorramdel (IRI)	15
Akylbek Urmatov (KGZ)	5
Róbert Meszároš (SVK)	0
Tamazi Sulamanidze (GEO)	10
Eldar Akhmadudinov (ANA)	10
Abdinur Nurlanbek (KAZ)	6

Quarterfinals
Levik Mikaelyan (ARM)	1
Ali Khorramdel (IRI)	6
Tamazi Sulamanidze (GEO)	2
Eldar Akhmadudinov (ANA)	5

Semifinals
Ali Khorramdel (IRI)	9
Eldar Akhmadudinov (ANA)	10

Bottom half

Round of 32
Rin Sakamoto (JPN)	14^{F}
Musa Aghayev (AZE)	3
Mykola Tashohlo (UKR)	11
Besir Alili (MKD)	14
Nic Bouzakis (USA)	4
Shehabeldin Mohamed (EGY)	2
Zoltán Mizsei (HUN)	2
Mohit Kumar (IND)	12

Round of 16
Dario Dittrich (GER)	0
Rin Sakamoto (JPN)	10
Besir Alili (MKD)	6
Emre Çetin (TUR)	4
Yahor Rudauski (ANA)	6
Nic Bouzakis (USA)	9
Mohit Kumar (IND)	10
Dmitri Carastoianov (MDA)	0

Quarterfinals
Rin Sakamoto (JPN)	0
Besir Alili (MKD)	3^{F}
Nic Bouzakis (USA)	11
Mohit Kumar (IND)	12

Semifinals
Besir Alili (MKD)	6
Mohit Kumar (IND)	8^{F}

Repechage round 1
Benjamin Boejthe (ROU)	4
Abdinur Nurlanbek (KAZ)	14
Zoltán Mizsei (HUN)	0
Dmitri Carastoianov (MDA)	11

Repechage round 2
Abdinur Nurlanbek (KAZ)	2
Tamazi Sulamanidze (GEO)	9^{F}
Dmitri Carastoianov (MDA)	0
Nic Bouzakis (USA)	10

Bronze medal match
Tamazi Sulamanidze (GEO)	0
Ali Khorramdel (IRI)	10
Nic Bouzakis (USA)	11
Besir Alili (MKD)	1

=== 65 kg ===
14 and 15 August

Legend

- F — Won by fall

Final

Final
Jesse Mendez (USA)	2
Mohammad Reza Shakeri (IRI)	5

Top half

Round of 32
Eligh Rivera (PUR)	11
Akseli Erkkola (FIN)	0
Abdullah Toprak (TUR)	10
Said El-Gahsh (EGY)	0
Zhao Mengxiang (CHN)	0
Sanzhar Mukhtar (KAZ)	11
Jakob Saurwein (AUT)	0
Ion Berghi (MDA)	10
Jesse Mendez (USA)	2
Mykyta Zubal (UKR)	1

Round of 16
Kamronbek Kadamov (UZB)	12
Eligh Rivera (PUR)	0
Abdullah Toprak (TUR)	9
Sanzhar Mukhtar (KAZ)	1
Dominik Jagusz (POL)	4
Ion Berghi (MDA)	14
Jesse Mendez (USA)	7
Aden Sakybaev (KGZ)	2

Quarterfinals
Kamronbek Kadamov (UZB)	2
Abdullah Toprak (TUR)	8^{F}
Ion Berghi (MDA)	4
Jesse Mendez (USA)	13

Semifinals
Abdullah Toprak (TUR)	1
Jesse Mendez (USA)	3

Bottom half

Round of 32
Seyfulla Itaev (FRA)	0
Dalgat Abdulkadyrov (ANA)	10
Ilya Rahozau (ANA)	2
Goga Otinashvili (GEO)	5
Jaskaran Singh (IND)	0
Kaiji Ogino (JPN)	12
Andranik Avetisyan (ARM)	10
Marcel Wagin (GER)	0
Zaid Meslah (JOR)	3
Felipe Ferrusola (ESP)	5

Round of 16
Ramik Heybatov (AZE)	0
Dalgat Abdulkadyrov (ANA)	7
Goga Otinashvili (GEO)	10
Doru Dincă (ROU)	0
Kaiji Ogino (JPN)	10
Andranik Avetisyan (ARM)	6
Felipe Ferrusola (ESP)	0
Mohammad Reza Shakeri (IRI)	10

Quarterfinals
Dalgat Abdulkadyrov (ANA)	10
Goga Otinashvili (GEO)	0
Kaiji Ogino (JPN)	0
Mohammad Reza Shakeri (IRI)	6

Semifinals
Dalgat Abdulkadyrov (ANA)	8
Mohammad Reza Shakeri (IRI)	11

Repechage round 1
Mykyta Zubal (UKR)	7
Aden Sakybaev (KGZ)	7

Repechage round 2
Aden Sakybaev (KGZ)	10
Ion Berghi (MDA)	0
Felipe Ferrusola (ESP)	0
Kaiji Ogino (JPN)	8

Bronze medal match
Aden Sakybaev (KGZ)	3
Abdullah Toprak (TUR)	5
Kaiji Ogino (JPN)	2
Dalgat Abdulkadyrov (ANA)	9

=== 70 kg ===
14 and 15 August

Legend

- F — Won by fall

Final

Final
Meyer Shapiro (USA)	11
Ali Rezaei (IRI)	6

Top half

Round of 32
Georgios Ioakeimidis (GRE)	2
Viljams Lutkevics (LAT)	7
Narender (IND)	7
Zafarbek Otakhonov (UZB)	10
Muhamed Bektemirov (AUT)	0
Magomed Baituakev (ANA)	10
Yuma Tomiyama (JPN)	0
Meyer Shapiro (USA)	11

Round of 16
Burak Emin Salviz (GER)	11
Viljams Lutkevics (LAT)	0
Zafarbek Otakhonov (UZB)	5
Julian George (PUR)	11
Mikita Dzemchanka (ANA)	0
Magomed Baituakev (ANA)	10
Meyer Shapiro (USA)	6
Mirjavad Nabiyev (AZE)	4

Quarterfinals
Burak Emin Salviz (GER)	3
Julian George (PUR)	6
Magomed Baituakev (ANA)	0
Meyer Shapiro (USA)	8

Semifinals
Julian Michael (PUR)	0
Meyer Shapiro (USA)	11

Bottom half

Round of 32
Hayk Papikyan (ARM)	2
Saba Kobakhidze (GEO)	7
Marcell Nagy (HUN)	1
Rostyslav Prus (UKR)	7
Ali Rezaei (IRI)	9
Metehan Yaprak (TUR)	6
Pavel Graur (MDA)	11
Yegor Anchugin (KAZ)	1

Round of 16
Omurbek Taalaibek Uulu (KGZ)	8
Saba Kobakhidze (GEO)	7
Rostyslav Prus (UKR)	16
Abderrahmane Benaissa (ALG)	5
Zelimkhan Mutsukhaev (POL)	0
Ali Rezaei (IRI)	10
Pavel Graur (MDA)	9
Bozhidar Dzhorov (BUL)	2

Quarterfinals
Omurbek Taalaibek Uulu (KGZ)	7
Rostyslav Prus (UKR)	1
Ali Rezaei (IRI)	10
Pavel Graur (MDA)	0

Semifinals
Omurbek Taalaibek Uulu (KGZ)	4
Ali Rezaei (IRI)	6

Repechage round 1
Yuma Tomiyama (JPN)	9
Mirjavad Nabiyev (AZE)	2
Metehan Yaprak (TUR)	10
Zelimkhan Mutsukhaev (POL)	0

Repechage round 2
Yuma Tomiyama (JPN)	3
Magomed Baituakev (ANA)	7
Metehan Yaprak (TUR)	3
Pavel Graur (MDA)	1

Bronze medal match
Magomed Baituakev (ANA)	12
Julian George (PUR)	2
Metehan Yaprak (TUR)	3
Omurbek Taalaibek Uulu (KGZ)	2

=== 74 kg ===
15 and 16 August

Legend

- F — Won by fall

Final

Final
Hossein Mohammad Aghaei (IRI)	5
Mitchell Mesenbrink (USA)	16

Top half

Round of 32
Tanner Peake (PUR)	2
Ryunosuke Kamiya (JPN)	5
Amaan Gulacha (CAN)	3
Yerkhan Bexultanov (KAZ)	14
Asadbek Karimov (UZB)	5
Armen Musikyan (ARM)	0
Azymberdi Saparow (TKM)	4
Giorgi Gogritchiani (GEO)	5
Stas David Wolf (GER)	2
Hossein Mohammad Aghaei (IRI)	6

Round of 16
Anton Suchkov (ANA)	3
Ryunosuke Kamiya (JPN)	2
Yerkhan Bexultanov (KAZ)	6
Asadbek Karimov (UZB)	3
Raul Caso (ITA)	1
Giorgi Gogritchiani (GEO)	2
Hossein Mohammad Aghaei (IRI)	10
Ihar Shalima (ANA)	0

Quarterfinals
Anton Suchkov (ANA)	8
Yerkhan Bexultanov (KAZ)	4
Giorgi Gogritchiani (GEO)	1
Hossein Mohammad Aghaei (IRI)	7

Semifinals
Anton Suchkov (ANA)	0
Hossein Mohammad Aghaei (IRI)	9

Bottom half

Round of 32
Mitchell Mesenbrink (USA)	10
Ion Laurențiu Marcu (MDA)	0
Mevlüt Özdemir (TUR)	0
Jaideep Narwal (IND)	6^{F}
Baoyindalai (CHN)	13
Artūrs Puriņš (LAT)	2
Ivan Stoyanov (BUL)	13
Marian Subțirică (ROU)	4
Mykyta Morhun (UKR)	12
Mohamed Abdelhady (EGY)	10
Marcin Stanek (POL)	0
Orts Isakov (JOR)	6^{F}

Round of 16
Elkhan Garayev (AZE)	1
Mitchell Mesenbrink (USA)	12
Jaideep Narwal (IND)	10
Baoyindalai (CHN)	0
Ivan Stoyanov (BUL)	5
Mykyta Morhun (UKR)	3
Orts Isakov (JOR)	6
Zhakshylyk Baitashov (KGZ)	12^{F}

Quarterfinals
Mitchell Mesenbrink (USA)	11
Jaideep Narwal (IND)	0
Ivan Stoyanov (BUL)	1
Zhakshylyk Baitashov (KGZ)	3

Semifinals
Mitchell Mesenbrink (USA)	10
Zhakshylyk Baitashov (KGZ)	0

Repechage round 1
Stas David Wolf (GER)	11
Ihar Shalima (ANA)	0
Ion Laurențiu Marcu (MDA)	2
Elkhan Garayev (AZE)	13

Repechage round 2
Stas David Wolf (GER)	7
Giorgi Gogritchiani (GEO)	11
Elkhan Garayev (AZE)	5
Jaideep Narwal (IND)	6^{F}

Bronze medal match
Giorgi Gogritchiani (GEO)	3
Anton Suchkov (ANA)	2
Jaideep Narwal (IND)	4^{F}
Zhakshylyk Baitashov (KGZ)	2

=== 79 kg ===
14 and 15 August

Legend

- F — Won by fall

Final

Final
Ibragim Kadiev (ANA)	17
Sagar Jaglan (IND)	6

Top half

Round of 32
Traian Căpățînă (MDA)	3
Alim Miesuvietov (UKR)	4
Ibragim Kadiev (ANA)	10
Farzad Safi Jahanshahi (IRI)	0
Magzhan Zhanyrbay (KAZ)	10
Connor Church (CAN)	0
Chris Baker (AUS)	0
Ryogo Asano (JPN)	10
Mateusz Pędzicki (POL)	0
Ali Tcokaev (AZE)	10

Round of 16
Paulius Leščauskas (LTU)	1
Alim Miesuvietov (UKR)	10
Ibragim Kadiev (ANA)	12
Magzhan Zhanyrbay (KAZ)	2
Otari Adeishvili (GEO)	7
Ryogo Asano (JPN)	0
Ali Tcokaev (AZE)	10
Lukas Lins (AUT)	0

Quarterfinals
Alim Miesuvietov (UKR)	0
Ibragim Kadiev (ANA)	10
Otari Adeishvili (GEO)	2
Ali Tcokaev (AZE)	13

Semifinals
Ibragim Kadiev (ANA)	8
Ali Tcokaev (AZE)	4

Bottom half

Round of 32
Narek Grigoryan (ARM)	3
Dzmitry Lukashuk (ANA)	2
Denizbek Ulan Uulu (KGZ)	2
Matthew Singleton (USA)	12
Nándor Hajduch (HUN)	6
Steven Rodríguez (VEN)	3
Kimi Käppeli (SUI)	5
Matteo Monteiro (CPV)	1
Ahmet Yağan (TUR)	10
Gregor Eigenbrodt (GER)	0
Radomir Stoyanov (BUL)	4
Sagar Jaglan (IND)	15

Round of 16
Soltan Begenjow (TKM)	5
Narek Grigoryan (ARM)	6
Matthew Singleton (USA)	10
Nándor Hajduch (HUN)	0
Kimi Käppeli (SUI)	4
Ahmet Yağan (TUR)	7
Sagar Jaglan (IND)	10
Abdallah Makoon (JOR)	0

Quarterfinals
Narek Grigoryan (ARM)	6
Matthew Singleton (USA)	10
Ahmet Yağan (TUR)	1
Sagar Jaglan (IND)	11

Semifinals
Matthew Singleton (USA)	6
Sagar Jaglan (IND)	16

Repechage round 1
Farzad Safi Jahanshahi (IRI)	7
Magzhan Zhanyrbay (KAZ)	5
Radomir Stoyanov (BUL)	WO
~~Abdallah Makoon (JOR)~~

Repechage round 2
Farzad Safi Jahanshahi (IRI)	4
Alim Miesuvietov (UKR)	1
Radomir Stoyanov (BUL)	2
Ahmet Yağan (TUR)	3

Bronze medal match
Farzad Safi Jahanshahi (IRI)	1
Ali Tcokaev (AZE)	11
Ahmet Yağan (TUR)	7
Matthew Singleton (USA)	9

=== 86 kg ===
15 and 16 August

Legend

- F — Won by fall

Final

Final
Rakhim Magamadov (FRA)	6
Fumiya Igarashi (JPN)	4

Top half

Round of 32
Gabriele Niccolini (ITA)	2
Ivan Chornohuz (UKR)	10
Imangali Kaldybek (KAZ)	3
Slavi Stamenov (BUL)	5
Noah Schwaller (SUI)	12
Kuo Tien-pang (TPE)	2
Filip Błaszczyk (POL)	0
Orazmuhammet Hojalyýew (TKM)	9
Vadzim Bandarkou (ANA)	0
Rakhim Magamadov (FRA)	10

Round of 16
Bennett Berge (USA)	9
Ivan Chornohuz (UKR)	5
Slavi Stamenov (BUL)	11
Noah Schwaller (SUI)	8
Tabriz Bayramov (AZE)	3
Orazmuhammet Hojalyýew (TKM)	9
Rakhim Magamadov (FRA)	10^{F}
Shakjir Bislimi (MKD)	0

Quarterfinals
Bennett Berge (USA)	11
Slavi Stamenov (BUL)	0
Orazmuhammet Hojalyýew (TKM)	0
Rakhim Magamadov (FRA)	10

Semifinals
Bennett Berge (USA)	2
Rakhim Magamadov (FRA)	9

Bottom half

Round of 32
Maiding Yuemai Er Aili (CHN)	7
Mushegh Mkrtchyan (ARM)	8
Tornike Samkharadze (GEO)	0
Fumiya Igarashi (JPN)	11
Ulukbek Soorombekov (KGZ)	9
Kiril Kildau (GER)	2
Eugeniu Mihalcean (MDA)	4
Ali Shakriev (ANA)	4
Mukul Dahiya (IND)	11
Dāvids Pirozniks (LAT)	0

Round of 16
Péter Zsivnovszki (HUN)	2
Mushegh Mkrtchyan (ARM)	12
Fumiya Igarashi (JPN)	10
Harun Kılıç (TUR)	0
Ulukbek Soorombekov (KGZ)	2
Eugeniu Mihalcean (MDA)	12
Mukul Dahiya (IND)	0
Amir Hossein Alizadeh (IRI)	2

Quarterfinals
Mushegh Mkrtchyan (ARM)	0
Fumiya Igarashi (JPN)	10
Eugeniu Mihalcean (MDA)	5
Amir Hossein Alizadeh (IRI)	3

Semifinals
Fumiya Igarashi (JPN)	10
Eugeniu Mihalcean (MDA)	0

Repechage round 1
Vadzim Bandarkou (ANA)	1
Shakjir Bislimi (MKD)	12^{F}
Tornike Samkharadze (GEO)	16
Harun Kılıç (TUR)	8

Repechage round 2
Shakjir Bislimi (MKD)	12^{F}
Orazmuhammet Hojalyýew (TKM)	4
Tornike Samkharadze (GEO)	3
Mushegh Mkrtchyan (ARM)	5

Bronze medal match
Shakjir Bislimi (MKD)	0
Bennett Berge (USA)	11
Mushegh Mkrtchyan (ARM)	0
Eugeniu Mihalcean (MDA)	3

=== 92 kg ===
15 and 16 August

Legend

- F — Won by fall

Final

Final
Rizabek Aitmukhan (KAZ)	4
Mohammad Mobin Azimi (IRI)	5

Top half

Round of 32
Aliaksei Zhorau (ANA)	3
Krisztián Angyal (HUN)	5

Round of 16
Nurbolot Adyl Uulu (KGZ)	0
Rizabek Aitmukhan (KAZ)	7
Krisztián Angyal (HUN)	0
Sam Pereira (CAN)	11
Giorgi Romelashvili (GEO)	4
Jack Darrah (USA)	3
Wiktor Hasa (POL)	2
Daniel Fischer (GER)	4

Quarterfinals
Rizabek Aitmukhan (KAZ)	10
Sam Pereira (CAN)	0
Giorgi Romelashvili (GEO)	9
Daniel Fischer (GER)	5

Semifinals
Rizabek Aitmukhan (KAZ)	11
Giorgi Romelashvili (GEO)	1

Bottom half

Round of 32
Ravan Musayev (AZE)	5^{F}
Issa Kikuchi (JPN)	0

Round of 16
Mustafagadzhi Malachdibirov (ANA)	10
Vinay (IND)	0
Mohammad Mobin Azimi (IRI)	14
Sali Saliev (BUL)	3
Knyaz Iboyan (ARM)	3
Ravan Musayev (AZE)	2
Yaroslav Lisniak (UKR)	0
Muhammed Gimri (TUR)	10

Quarterfinals
Mustafagadzhi Malachdibirov (ANA)	0
Mohammad Mobin Azimi (IRI)	11
Knyaz Iboyan (ARM)	6
Muhammed Gimri (TUR)	3

Semifinals
Mohammad Mobin Azimi (IRI)	10
Knyaz Iboyan (ARM)	0

Repechage round 2
Nurbolot Adyl Uulu (KGZ)	12
Sam Pereira (CAN)	2
Sali Saliev (BUL)	0
Mustafagadzhi Malachdibirov (ANA)	11

Bronze medal match
Nurbolot Adyl Uulu (KGZ)	1
Giorgi Romelashvili (GEO)	8
Mustafagadzhi Malachdibirov (ANA)	11
Knyaz Iboyan (ARM)	0

=== 97 kg ===
14 and 15 August

Legend

- F — Won by fall

Final

Final
Abolfazl Babaloo (IRI)	5
Ivan Prymachenko (UKR)	0

Top half

Round of 32
Zafar Aliyev (AZE)	7
Khachatur Khachatryan (ARM)	0

Round of 16
Tuxige (CHN)	0
Abolfazl Babaloo (IRI)	10
Zafar Aliyev (AZE)	2
Kamil Kurugliyev (KAZ)	5
Taron Shahinyan (POL)	10
Wu You-wei (TPE)	0
Camden McDanel (USA)	12
Toyoki Hamada (JPN)	1

Quarterfinals
Abolfazl Babaloo (IRI)	6
Kamil Kurugliyev (KAZ)	1
Taron Shahinyan (POL)	2
Camden McDanel (USA)	12

Semifinals
Abolfazl Babaloo (IRI)	5
Camden McDanel (USA)	1

Bottom half

Round of 32
Islam Kilchukov (ANA)	12
Doğan Uzun (TUR)	4

Round of 16
Grigori Tomailî (MDA)	2
Deepak Chahal (IND)	12
Ivan Prymachenko (UKR)	8
Mohamed Salaheldin (EGY)	2
Uladzislau Kazlou (ANA)	5
Islam Kilchukov (ANA)	1
Florin Tripon (ROU)	10
Nika Pantsulaia (GEO)	9

Quarterfinals
Deepak Chahal (IND)	4
Ivan Prymachenko (UKR)	8
Uladzislau Kazlou (ANA)	10
Florin Tripon (ROU)	0

Semifinals
Ivan Prymachenko (UKR)	5
Uladzislau Kazlou (ANA)	3

Repechage round 2
Tuxige (CHN)	1
Kamil Kurugliyev (KAZ)	7
Mohamed Salaheldin (EGY)	0
Deepak Chahal (IND)	11

Bronze medal match
Kamil Kurugliyev (KAZ)	2
Camden McDanel (USA)	8
Deepak Chahal (IND)	9
Uladzislau Kazlou (ANA)	8

=== 125 kg ===
15 and 16 August

Legend

- F — Won by fall

Final

Final
Amir Reza Masoumi (IRI)	11
Said Akhmatov (ANA)	0

Top half

Round of 32
Hakan Büyükçıngıl (TUR)	1
Amir Reza Masoumi (IRI)	9

Round of 16
Ksawery Kamiński (POL)	2
Christian Carroll (USA)	14
Amir Reza Masoumi (IRI)	11
Lu Da (CHN)	0
Aliaksandr Hradoukin (ANA)	0
Volodymyr Kochanov (UKR)	10
Ha Youn-ho (KOR)	2
Marlen Kurlysbek (KAZ)	5^{F}

Quarterfinals
Christian Carroll (USA)	0
Amir Reza Masoumi (IRI)	10
Volodymyr Kochanov (UKR)	12^{F}
Marlen Kurlysbek (KAZ)	2

Semifinals
Amir Reza Masoumi (IRI)	11
Volodymyr Kochanov (UKR)	0

Bottom half

Round of 32
Said Akhmatov (ANA)	12
Rajat Ruhal (IND)	0
Ryusei Fujita (JPN)	0
Levan Lagvilava (FRA)	9

Round of 16
Teodor Gjorgiev (MKD)	0
Yusif Dursunov (AZE)	10
Said Akhmatov (ANA)	10
Stefan Shavkov (BUL)	0
Zurab Romelashvili (GEO)	1
Levan Lagvilava (FRA)	2
Karanveer Mahil (CAN)	10
Roope Kataja (FIN)	0

Quarterfinals
Yusif Dursunov (AZE)	1
Said Akhmatov (ANA)	5
Levan Lagvilava (FRA)	0
Karanveer Mahil (CAN)	11

Semifinals
Said Akhmatov (ANA)	6
Karanveer Mahil (CAN)	3

Repechage round 1
Hakan Büyükçıngıl (TUR)	WO
Lu Da (CHN)
Rajat Ruhal (IND)	10
Stefan Shavkov (BUL)	0

Repechage round 2
Hakan Büyükçıngıl (TUR)	13^{F}
Christian Carroll (USA)	0
Rajat Ruhal (IND)	14
Yusif Dursunov (AZE)	4

Bronze medal match
Hakan Büyükçıngıl (TUR)	11
Volodymyr Kochanov (UKR)	1
Rajat Ruhal (IND)	9
Karanveer Mahil (CAN)	8

== See also ==
- 2023 World Junior Wrestling Championships – Men's Greco-Roman
- 2023 World Junior Wrestling Championships – Women's freestyle
