= List of Neftçi PFK managers =

Managers of the Ajerbaijani professional football club

This is a list of all managers of the Neftchi Baku professional football club of Azerbaijan, including performance records and honours.

Neftchi Baku have had many managers and head coaches throughout their history, below is a chronological list of them from when Azerbaijan Premier League was changed into a league format.

The most successful Neftchi manager in terms of trophies won is Kazbek Tuaev, who won three Azerbaijan Premier League titles and two Azerbaijan Cup trophies in his 6-year reign as manager.

== Statistics ==
Information correct as of match played 7 October 2024. Only competitive matches are counted.

| Name | Nat. | From | To | P | W | D | L | GS | GA | %W | Honours | Notes |
|---|---|---|---|---|---|---|---|---|---|---|---|---|
| Alexander Gnezdov | Soviet Union | 1937 | 1937 | 11 | 2 | 1 | 8 | 14 | 31 | 18.18 | | |
| Konstantin Kuznetsov | Soviet Union | 1938 | 1941 | N/A | N/A | N/A | N/A | N/A | N/A | N/A | | |
| A. Shaposhnikov | Soviet Union | 1946 | 1946 | N/A | N/A | N/A | N/A | N/A | N/A | N/A | | |
| K. Parsadanov | Soviet Union | 1947 | 1947 | N/A | N/A | N/A | N/A | N/A | N/A | N/A | | |
| Mikhail Churkin | Soviet Union | 1948 | 1948 | N/A | N/A | N/A | N/A | N/A | N/A | N/A | | |
| Viktor Patsevich | Soviet Union | 1948 | 1948 | N/A | N/A | N/A | N/A | N/A | N/A | N/A | | |
| Gavriil Putilin | Soviet Union | 1949 | 1949 | N/A | N/A | N/A | N/A | N/A | N/A | N/A | | |
| Viktor Patsevich | Soviet Union | 1949 | 1949 | N/A | N/A | N/A | N/A | N/A | N/A | N/A | | |
| Mikhail Churkin | Soviet Union | 1950 | 1950 | N/A | N/A | N/A | N/A | N/A | N/A | N/A | | |
| Shirali Shiraliyev | Soviet Union | 1951 | 1952 | 34 | 17 | 11 | 6 | 56 | 27 | 50.00 | | |
| Viktor Novikov | Soviet Union | 1953 | 1955 | N/A | N/A | N/A | N/A | N/A | N/A | N/A | | |
| Nikolay Rasskazov | Soviet Union | 1955 | 1955 | N/A | N/A | N/A | N/A | N/A | N/A | N/A | | |
| Viktor Panyukov | Soviet Union | 1956 | 1956 | N/A | N/A | N/A | N/A | N/A | N/A | N/A | | |
| Kamal Akhundov | Soviet Union | 1956 | 1956 | N/A | N/A | N/A | N/A | N/A | N/A | N/A | | |
| Oleg Timakov | Soviet Union | 1957 | 1957 | N/A | N/A | N/A | N/A | N/A | N/A | N/A | | |
| Shirali Shiraliyev | Soviet Union | 1958 | 1958 | N/A | N/A | N/A | N/A | N/A | N/A | N/A | | |
| Oleg Timakov | Soviet Union | 1958 | 1958 | N/A | N/A | N/A | N/A | N/A | N/A | N/A | | |
| Konstantin Kuznetsov | Soviet Union | 1959 | 1959 | N/A | N/A | N/A | N/A | N/A | N/A | N/A | | |
| Veniamin Krylov | Soviet Union | 1959 | 1960 | N/A | N/A | N/A | N/A | N/A | N/A | N/A | | |
| Boris Arkadyev | Soviet Union | 1961 | 1962 | 32 | 7 | 13 | 12 | 35 | 52 | 21.88 | | |
| Alakbar Mammadov | Soviet Union | 1963 | 1965 | N/A | N/A | N/A | N/A | N/A | N/A | N/A | | |
| Vasiliy Sokolov | Soviet Union | 1965 | 1966 | N/A | N/A | N/A | N/A | N/A | N/A | N/A | | |
| Ahmad Alaskarov | Soviet Union | 1966 | 1970 | N/A | N/A | N/A | N/A | N/A | N/A | N/A | Soviet Top League (bronze) | |
| Alakbar Mammadov | Soviet Union | 1971 | 1972 | 36 | 16 | 10 | 10 | 51 | 33 | 44.44 | | |
| Valentin Khlystov | Soviet Union | 1973 | 1975 | 144 | 58 | 38 | 48 | 198 | 165 | 40.28 | | |
| Gennadi Bondarenko | Soviet Union | 1976 | 1978 | N/A | N/A | N/A | N/A | N/A | N/A | N/A | | |
| Igor Netto | Soviet Union | 1979 | 1979 | N/A | N/A | N/A | N/A | N/A | N/A | N/A | | |
| Ahmad Alaskarov | Soviet Union | 1979 | 1982 | N/A | N/A | N/A | N/A | N/A | N/A | N/A | | |
| Kazbek Tuaev | Soviet Union | 1983 | 1984 | N/A | N/A | N/A | N/A | N/A | N/A | N/A | | |
| Ruslan Abdullayev | Soviet Union | 1984 | 1984 | N/A | N/A | N/A | N/A | N/A | N/A | N/A | | |
| Vyacheslav Soloviev | Soviet Union | 1985 | 1985 | N/A | N/A | N/A | N/A | N/A | N/A | N/A | | |
| Ruslan Abdullayev | Soviet Union | 1986 | 1986 | N/A | N/A | N/A | N/A | N/A | N/A | N/A | | |
| Aleksandr Sevidov | Soviet Union | 1987 | 1987 | N/A | N/A | N/A | N/A | N/A | N/A | N/A | | |
| Agaselim Mirjavadov | Soviet Union | 1987 | 1988 | N/A | N/A | N/A | N/A | N/A | N/A | N/A | | |
| Yuri Kuznetsov | Soviet Union | 1988 | 1988 | N/A | N/A | N/A | N/A | N/A | N/A | N/A | | |
| Agaselim Mirjavadov | Soviet Union | 1989 | 1989 | N/A | N/A | N/A | N/A | N/A | N/A | N/A | | |
| Ruslan Abdullayev | Soviet Union | 1989 | 1991 | N/A | N/A | N/A | N/A | N/A | N/A | N/A | | |
| Kazbek Tuaev | Soviet Union | 1991 | 1991 | N/A | N/A | N/A | N/A | N/A | N/A | N/A | | |
| Ahmad Alaskarov | Azerbaijan | 1991 | 1992 | N/A | N/A | N/A | N/A | N/A | N/A | N/A | Azerbaijan Premier League | |
| Sergey Kramarenko | Azerbaijan | 1993 | 1993 | N/A | N/A | N/A | N/A | N/A | N/A | N/A | Azerbaijan Premier League | |
| Vagif Sadygov | Azerbaijan | 1993 | 1995 | N/A | N/A | N/A | N/A | N/A | N/A | N/A | Azerbaijan Cup (2); Azerbaijan Supercup (2) | |
| Kazbek Tuaev | Azerbaijan | 1996 | 1997 | 30 | 23 | 5 | 2 | 98 | 20 | 76.67 | Azerbaijan Premier League | |
| Ruslan Abdullayev | Azerbaijan | 1997 | 1997 | N/A | N/A | N/A | N/A | N/A | N/A | N/A | | |
| Kazbek Tuaev | Azerbaijan | 1998 | 1999 | 36 | 19 | 10 | 7 | 68 | 25 | 52.78 | Azerbaijan Cup | |
| Ahmad Alaskarov | Azerbaijan | 1999 | 2000 | N/A | N/A | N/A | N/A | N/A | N/A | N/A | | |
| Asef Namazov | Azerbaijan | 2000 | 2000 | N/A | N/A | N/A | N/A | N/A | N/A | N/A | | |
| Ogtay Abdullaev | Azerbaijan | 2001 | 2001 | N/A | N/A | N/A | N/A | N/A | N/A | N/A | | |
| Rashid Uzbekov | Azerbaijan | 2001 | 2001 | N/A | N/A | N/A | N/A | N/A | N/A | N/A | | |
| Kazbek Tuaev | Azerbaijan | 2001 | 2004 | N/A | N/A | N/A | N/A | N/A | N/A | N/A | Azerbaijan Premier League (2); Azerbaijan Cup | |
| Agaselim Mirjavadov | Azerbaijan | 2004 | 2006 | N/A | N/A | N/A | N/A | N/A | N/A | N/A | Azerbaijan Premier League; CIS Cup | |
| Gurban Gurbanov | Azerbaijan | Jun 2006 | Aug 2007 | 38 | 25 | 6 | 7 | 76 | 28 | 65.79 | | |
| Vlastimil Petržela | Czech Republic | Sep 2007 | Jan 2008 | N/A | N/A | N/A | N/A | N/A | N/A | N/A | | |
| Anatoliy Demyanenko | Ukraine | Jan 2008 | Sep 2008 | N/A | N/A | N/A | N/A | N/A | N/A | N/A | | |
| Hans-Jürgen Gede | Germany | Aug 2008 | Feb 2009 | N/A | N/A | N/A | N/A | N/A | N/A | N/A | | |
| Boyukagha Aghayev | Azerbaijan | Mar 2009 | Sep 2009 | N/A | N/A | N/A | N/A | N/A | N/A | N/A | | |
| Vagif Sadygov | Azerbaijan | Oct 2009 | Feb 2010 | N/A | N/A | N/A | N/A | N/A | N/A | N/A | | |
| Arif Asadov | Azerbaijan | Feb 2010 | Jul 2011 | 32 | 19 | 10 | 3 | 53 | 17 | 59.38 | Azerbaijan Premier League | |
| Boyukagha Hajiyev | Azerbaijan | Aug 2011 | Jul 2013 | 64 | 39 | 8 | 17 | 114 | 62 | 60.94 | Azerbaijan Premier League (2); Azerbaijan Cup (2) | |
| Tarlan Ahmadov | Azerbaijan | Jul 2013 | Oct 2013 | 10 | 6 | 3 | 1 | 14 | 7 | 60.00 | | |
| Nazim Suleymanov | Azerbaijan | Oct 2013 | Jan 2014 | 8 | 4 | 1 | 3 | 13 | 12 | 50.00 | | |
| Boyukagha Hajiyev | Azerbaijan | Jan 2014 | Sep 2014 | 11 | 5 | 2 | 4 | 13 | 14 | 45.45 | Azerbaijan Cup | |
| Arif Asadov | Azerbaijan | Sep 2014 | May 2015 | 10 | 6 | 2 | 2 | 13 | 8 | 60.00 | | |
| Samir Aliyev | Azerbaijan | Jun 2015 | Nov 2015 | 10 | 6 | 2 | 2 | 13 | 8 | 60.00 | | |
| Asgar Abdullayev | Azerbaijan | Nov 2015 | March 2016 | | | | | | | | | |
| Vali Gasimov | Azerbaijan | March 2016 | September 2016 | | | | | | | | | |
| Elkhan Abdullayev | Azerbaijan | September 2016 | August 2017 | | | | | | | | | |
| Tarlan Ahmadov | Azerbaijan | September 2017 | 31 May 2018 | | | | | | | | | |
| Roberto Bordin | Italy | 8 June 2018 | 18 January 2020 | 54 | 30 | 13 | 11 | 94 | 49 | 55.56 | | |
| Fizuli Mammedov | Azerbaijan | 18 January 2020 | 11 November 2020 | 17 | 8 | 5 | 4 | 21 | 19 | 47.06 | | |
| Samir Abasov | Azerbaijan | 11 November 2020 | 10 June 2022 | 61 | 32 | 14 | 15 | 95 | 62 | 52.46 | Azerbaijan Premier League | |
| Laurențiu Reghecampf | Romania | 21 June 2022 | 21 June 2023 | 45 | 24 | 8 | 13 | 74 | 48 | 53.33 | | |
| Adrian Mutu | Romania | 11 July 2023 | 24 December 2023 | 24 | 10 | 5 | 9 | 31 | 24 | 41.67 | | |
| Miodrag Božović | Montenegro | 24 December 2023 | 26 May 2024 | 22 | 9 | 5 | 8 | 35 | 34 | 40.91 | | |
| Roman Hryhorchuk | Ukraine | 26 June 2024 | 7 October 2024 | 9 | 0 | 5 | 4 | 6 | 15 | 0.00 | | |
| Samir Abasov | Azerbaijan | 14 October 2024 | | 0 | 0 | 0 | 0 | 0 | 0 | — | | |

- Notes:

P – Total of played matches W – Won matches D – Drawn matches L – Lost matches GS – Goal scored GA – Goals against
%W – Percentage of matches won

Nationality is indicated by the corresponding FIFA country code(s).

== Gallery ==
Alakbar Mammadov

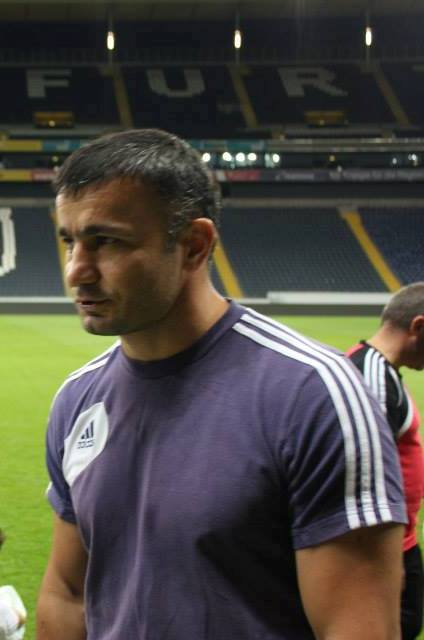
Gurban Gurbanov

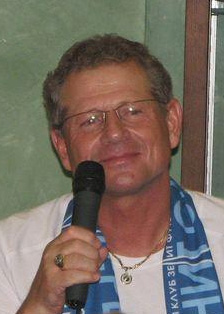
Vlastimil Petržela

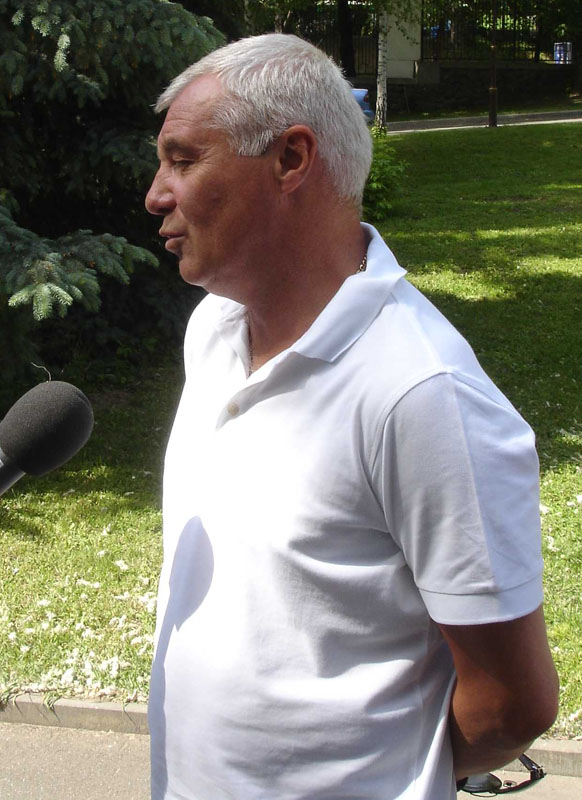
Anatoliy Demyanenko

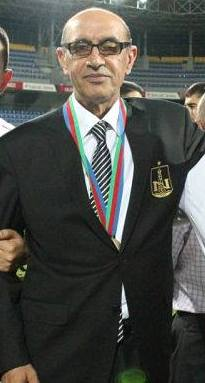
Boyukagha Hajiyev
