= Kulkam =

Kulkam Кулкам
- Selo
- Location within Republic of Dagestan Location within Russia
- Coordinates: 42°24′N 47°57′E
- Country: Russia
- Region: Republic of Dagestan
- District: Kayakentsky District
- Time zone: UTC+3:00

Kulkam (Russian: Кулкам) is a rural locality (a selo) in Kayakentsky District, Republic of Dagestan, Russia. The population was 268 as of 2010.

== Geography ==
Kulkam is located 9 km northwest of Novokayakent (the district's administrative centre) by road. Kayakent and Shalasi are the nearest rural localities.

== Nationalities ==
Dargins live there.
