= Karanayaul =

Karanayaul Каранайаул Къаранай-авул
- Selo
- Location within Republic of Dagestan Location within Russia
- Coordinates: 42°30′N 47°51′E
- Country: Russia
- Region: Republic of Dagestan
- District: Kayakentsky District
- Time zone: UTC+3:00

Karanayaul (Russian: Каранайаул; Kumyk: Къаранай-авул, Qaranay-avul) is a rural locality (a selo) in Kayakentsky District, Republic of Dagestan, Russia. The population was 1,695 as of 2010. There are 11 streets.

== Geography ==
Karanayaul is located 27 km northwest of Novokayakent (the district's administrative centre) by road. Sagasi-Deybuk and Pervomayskoye are the nearest rural localities.

== Nationalities ==
Kumyks and Dargins live there.
