= Dzhavankent =

Dzhavankent Джаванкент Джавангент
- Selo
- Location within Republic of Dagestan Location within Russia
- Coordinates: 42°15′N 47°48′E
- Country: Russia
- Region: Republic of Dagestan
- District: Kayakentsky District
- Time zone: UTC+3:00

Dzhavankent (Russian: Джаванкент; Kumyk: Джавангент, Cavangent) is a rural locality (a selo) in Kayakentsky District, Republic of Dagestan, Russia. The population was 1,011 as of 2010. There are 21 streets.

== Geography ==
Dzhavankent is located 31 km southwest of Novokayakent (the district's administrative centre) by road. Kapkaykent and Bashlykent are the nearest rural localities.

== Nationalities ==
Kumyks live there.
