= Kapkaykent =

Kapkaykent Капкайкент Къапкайгент
- Selo
- Location within Republic of Dagestan Location within Russia
- Coordinates: 42°14′N 47°47′E
- Country: Russia
- Region: Republic of Dagestan
- District: Kayakentsky District
- Time zone: UTC+3:00

Kapkaykent (Russian: Капкайкент; Kumyk: Къапкайгент, Qapkaygent) is a rural locality (a selo) in Kayakentsky District, Republic of Dagestan, Russia. The population was 1,020 as of 2010. There are 21 streets.

== Geography ==
Kapkaykent is located 31 km southwest of Novokayakent (the district's administrative centre) by road. Dzhavankent and Bashlykent are the nearest rural localities.

== Nationalities ==
Kumyks live there.
