= Deybuk =

Deybuk Дейбук ДейбукI
- Selo
- Location within Republic of Dagestan Location within Russia
- Coordinates: 42°12′N 47°31′E
- Country: Russia
- Region: Republic of Dagestan
- District: Kayakentsky District
- Time zone: UTC+3:00

Deybuk (Russian: Дейбук; Dargwa: ДейбукI) is a rural locality (a selo) in Sagasi-Deybuksky Selsoviet, Kayakentsky District, Republic of Dagestan, Russia. The population was 435 as of 2010.

== Nationalities ==
Dargins live there.

== Geography ==
Deybuk is located 8 km southwest of Novokayakent (the district's administrative centre) by road. Kishcha and Meusisha are the nearest rural localities.
