= 2023 World Junior Wrestling Championships – Men's Greco-Roman =

The men's Greco-Roman competitions at the 2023 World Junior Wrestling Championships will be held in Amman, Jordan between 18 and 20 August 2023.

== Men's Greco-Roman ==
=== 55 kg ===
18 and 19 August

Legend

- F — Won by fall
- WO — Won by walkover

Final

Final
Farid Sadikhli (AZE)	1
Iskhar Kurbayev (KAZ)	5

Top half

Round of 32
Ali Ahmadi Vafa (IRI)	8
Lukas Benzing (GER)	0
Farid Sadikhli (AZE)	8
Edmond Domokos (HUN)	0
Alisher Ganiev (UZB)	8
Alibek Amirov (ANA)	0

Round of 16
Dzianis Vitaroi (ANA)	4
Zachary Silvis (USA)	9^{F}
Ali Ahmadi Vafa (IRI)	7
Denis Mihai (ROU)	5
Ahmad Khaled Ahmad (JOR)	0
Farid Sadikhli (AZE)	9
Alisher Ganiev (UZB)	12
Kohei Yamagiwa (JPN)	3

Quarterfinals
Zachary Silvis (USA)	0
Ali Ahmadi Vafa (IRI)	11
Farid Sadikhli (AZE)	5
Alisher Ganiev (UZB)	1

Semifinals
Ali Ahmadi Vafa (IRI)	0
Farid Sadikhli (AZE)	9

Bottom half

Round of 32
Anil Mor (IND)	11^{F}
Luka Javakhadze (GEO)	2
Maxim Sarmanov (MDA)	4
Emre Mutlu (TUR)	9

Round of 16
Armen Gevorgyan (ARM)	1
Nuristan Suiorkulov (KGZ)	4
Anil Mor (IND)	11
Marko Voloshyn (UKR)	4
Iskhar Kurbayev (KAZ)	6
Emre Mutlu (TUR)	1
Abduwali Rahimbaýew (TKM)	11
Ilias Zairakis (GRE)	3

Quarterfinals
Nuristan Suiorkulov (KGZ)	7
Anil Mor (IND)	6
Iskhar Kurbayev (KAZ)	8
Abduwali Rahimbaýew (TKM)	0

Semifinals
Nuristan Suiorkulov (KGZ)	3
Iskhar Kurbayev (KAZ)	3

Repechage round 1
Edmond Domokos (HUN)	10
Ahmad Khaled Ahmad (JOR)	3

Repechage round 2
Edmond Domokos (HUN)	0
Alisher Ganiev (UZB)	8
Emre Mutlu (TUR)	WO
Abduwali Rahimbaýew (TKM)

Bronze medal match
Alisher Ganiev (UZB)	9
Ali Ahmadi Vafa (IRI)	0
Emre Mutlu (TUR)	1
Nuristan Suiorkulov (KGZ)	2

=== 60 kg ===
19 and 20 August

Legend

- F — Won by fall

Final

Final
Suren Aghajanyan (ARM)	13
Sumit Dalal (IND)	4

Top half

Round of 32
Dániel Rafael (HUN)	0
Bilal Bersanukaev (ANA)	8
Kuvonchbek Yakhshiboev (UZB)	12
Jeremy Peralta (ECU)	3
Suren Aghajanyan (ARM)	9
Gorka Gracia (ESP)	0

Round of 16
Emirlan Duishenaliev (KGZ)	9
Husein Hasanov (TJK)	1
Bilal Bersanukaev (ANA)	11
Vladyslav Levchuk (UKR)	0
Anri Khozrevanidze (GEO)	7
Kuvonchbek Yakhshiboev (UZB)	5
Suren Aghajanyan (ARM)	6^{F}
Ilkin Gurbanov (AZE)	0

Quarterfinals
Emirlan Duishenaliev (KGZ)	19
Bilal Bersanukaev (ANA)	8
Anri Khozrevanidze (GEO)	0
Suren Aghajanyan (ARM)	9

Semifinals
Emirlan Duishenaliev (KGZ)	0
Suren Aghajanyan (ARM)	8^{F}

Bottom half

Round of 32
Amir Reza Dehbozorgi (IRI)	13
Kemal Sevgili (TUR)	0
Koto Gomi (JPN)	11
Maxwell Black (USA)	0
Mathias Martinetti (SUI)	0
Olivier Skrzypczak (POL)	8

Round of 16
Wu Huangsheng (CHN)	0
Amir Reza Dehbozorgi (IRI)	6
Koto Gomi (JPN)	8
Lucas Lo Grasso (FRA)	0
Munthir Jandu (KSA)	0
Olivier Skrzypczak (POL)	7^{F}
Sumit Dalal (IND)	11
Saifulla Kurman (KAZ)	0

Quarterfinals
Amir Reza Dehbozorgi (IRI)	10
Koto Gomi (JPN)	0
Olivier Skrzypczak (POL)	7
Sumit Dalal (IND)	15

Semifinals
Amir Reza Dehbozorgi (IRI)	0
Sumit Dalal (IND)	10

Repechage round 1
Gorka Gracia (ESP)	2
Ilkin Gurbanov (AZE)	11

Repechage round 2
Ilkin Gurbanov (AZE)	4
Anri Khozrevanidze (GEO)	2
Saifulla Kurman (KAZ)	7
Olivier Skrzypczak (POL)	7

Bronze medal match
Ilkin Gurbanov (AZE)	3
Emirlan Duishenaliev (KGZ)	1
Saifulla Kurman (KAZ)	0
Amir Reza Dehbozorgi (IRI)	9

=== 63 kg ===
18 and 19 August

Legend

- F — Won by fall

Final

Final
Ahmad Reza Mohsennejad (IRI)	9
Zhantoro Mirzaliev (KGZ)	0

Top half

Round of 32
Daniial Agaev (ANA)	1
Komei Sawada (JPN)	6
Furkan Erken (TUR)	WO
Bredi Slinkers (NED)
Ahmad Reza Mohsennejad (IRI)	10
Sandeep (IND)	0

Round of 16
Matouš Jankovič (CZE)	1
Hristiyan Ivanov (BUL)	4
Komei Sawada (JPN)	3
Dávid Mányik (HUN)	1
Vitalie Eriomenco (MDA)	10
Furkan Erken (TUR)	1
Ahmad Reza Mohsennejad (IRI)	8
Khusniddin Olimboev (UZB)	0

Quarterfinals
Hristiyan Ivanov (BUL)	1
Komei Sawada (JPN)	7
Vitalie Eriomenco (MDA)	1
Ahmad Reza Mohsennejad (IRI)	5

Semifinals
Komei Sawada (JPN)	1
Ahmad Reza Mohsennejad (IRI)	5

Bottom half

Round of 32
Suhib Al-Hasanat (JOR)	3^{F}
Rati Khozrevanidze (GEO)	1
Faraim Mustafayev (AZE)	7
Yurik Hoveyan (ARM)	7

Round of 16
Zhantoro Mirzaliev (KGZ)	10
Vasyl Myshanych (UKR)	1
Suhib Al-Hasanat (JOR)	0
Landon Drury (USA)	9
Matej Rebić (CRO)	1
Yurik Hoveyan (ARM)	12
Adham El-Sayed (EGY)	1
Dinislam Sagitzhan (KAZ)	5

Quarterfinals
Zhantoro Mirzaliev (KGZ)	8
Landon Drury (USA)	5
Yurik Hoveyan (ARM)	1
Dinislam Sagitzhan (KAZ)	3

Semifinals
Zhantoro Mirzaliev (KGZ)	14^{F}
Dinislam Sagitzhan (KAZ)	7

Repechage round 1
Sandeep (IND)	7
Khusniddin Olimboev (UZB)	5

Repechage round 2
Sandeep (IND)	4
Vitalie Eriomenco (MDA)	3
Vasyl Myshanych (UKR)	2
Landon Drury (USA)	5

Bronze medal match
Sandeep (IND)	0
Komei Sawada (JPN)	4
Landon Drury (USA)	0
Dinislam Sagitzhan (KAZ)	9

=== 67 kg ===
19 and 20 August

Legend

- F — Won by fall

Final

Final
Gaspar Terteryan (ARM)	2
Moustafa Alameldin (EGY)	4

Top half

Round of 32
Leng Ji (CHN)	10
Kakabaý Kakabaýew (TKM)	3
Ilyosjon Abdinazarov (UZB)	7
Izet Bekirov (UKR)	7
Saud Al-Subaie (KSA)	11
Isa Bektemirov (AUT)	9^{F}
Gaspar Terteryan (ARM)	9
Saya Brunner (SUI)	0
Joel Adams (USA)	2
Artur Jeremejev (EST)	5
Nika Broladze (GEO)	11
Arslanbek Salimov (POL)	11

Round of 16
Nestori Mannila (FIN)	9
Leng Ji (CHN)	1
Izet Bekirov (UKR)	8
Isa Bektemirov (AUT)	0
Gaspar Terteryan (ARM)	2
Artur Jeremejev (EST)	0
Arslanbek Salimov (POL)	8
Aziz Gassymov (KAZ)	1

Quarterfinals
Nestori Mannila (FIN)	3
Izet Bekirov (UKR)	0
Gaspar Terteryan (ARM)	5
Arslanbek Salimov (POL)	3

Semifinals
Nestori Mannila (FIN)	2
Gaspar Terteryan (ARM)	5

Bottom half

Round of 32
Dimitar Georgiev (BUL)	8^{F}
Muhammad Koshbaev (KGZ)	0
Ilias Iandarov (ANA)	4^{F}
Gaith Odtallah (JOR)	0
Zsolt Takács (HUN)	2
Ahoura Bouveiri (IRI)	10
Kanan Abdullazade (AZE)	4
Umesh (IND)	2
Moustafa Alameldin (EGY)	8
Luka Ivančić (CRO)	0
Kim Gyeong-tae (KOR)	2
Kojiro Hasegawa (JPN)	6

Round of 16
Illia Valeuski (ANA)	12
Dimitar Georgiev (BUL)	4
Ilias Iandarov (ANA)	5
Ahoura Bouveiri (IRI)	6
Kanan Abdullazade (AZE)	5
Moustafa Alameldin (EGY)	7
Kojiro Hasegawa (JPN)	1
Azat Sarıyar (TUR)	7

Quarterfinals
Illia Valeuski (ANA)	0
Ahoura Bouveiri (IRI)	8
Moustafa Alameldin (EGY)	11
Azat Sarıyar (TUR)	0

Semifinals
Ahoura Bouveiri (IRI)	4
Moustafa Alameldin (EGY)	9

Repechage round 1
Saya Brunner (SUI)	1
Artur Jeremejev (EST)	1
Luka Ivančić (CRO)	0
Kanan Abdullazade (AZE)	9

Repechage round 2
Saya Brunner (SUI)	0
Arslanbek Salimov (POL)	5
Kanan Abdullazade (AZE)	4
Azat Sarıyar (TUR)	5

Bronze medal match
Arslanbek Salimov (POL)	4
Nestori Mannila (FIN)	0
Azat Sarıyar (TUR)	3
Ahoura Bouveiri (IRI)	2

=== 72 kg ===
19 and 20 August

Legend

- F — Won by fall

Final

Final
Levente Lévai (HUN)	0
Imran Aliev (ANA)	9

Top half

Round of 32
Michał Puchalski (POL)	1
Ognjen Jakovljević (SRB)	5
Omar Al-Daraghmeh (JOR)	7
Braden Stauffenberg (USA)	7^{F}
Muhammed Ali Göçmen (TUR)	10
Zahar Yanevich (ANA)	2
Aaron Bellscheidt (GER)	3
Yehia Abdelkader (EGY)	0
Hajime Kikuta (JPN)	14
Abdullo Aliev (UZB)	13

Round of 16
Levente Lévai (HUN)	9
Ognjen Jakovljević (SRB)	0
Braden Stauffenberg (USA)	0
Muhammed Ali Göçmen (TUR)	9
Kristo Merilain (EST)	0
Aaron Bellscheidt (GER)	6
Hajime Kikuta (JPN)	8
Kipras Gvozdas (LTU)	0

Quarterfinals
Levente Lévai (HUN)	10
Muhammed Ali Göçmen (TUR)	2
Aaron Bellscheidt (GER)	7
Hajime Kikuta (JPN)	0

Semifinals
Levente Lévai (HUN)	5
Aaron Bellscheidt (GER)	1

Bottom half

Round of 32
Yeldos Kamelov (KAZ)	9
Vasile Zabica (MDA)	0
Anri Putkaradze (GEO)	9
Lee Gun-hee (KOR)	4
Imur Temirbekov (KGZ)	0
Imran Aliev (ANA)	8
Irfan Mirzoiev (UKR)	0
Mohammad Mahdi Miri (IRI)	9

Round of 16
Muhamed Bektemirov (AUT)	0
Yeldos Kamelov (KAZ)	10^{F}
Anri Putkaradze (GEO)	3
Ashot Khachatryan (ARM)	1
Ankit Gulia (IND)	3
Imran Aliev (ANA)	11
Mohammad Mahdi Miri (IRI)	1
Ruslan Nurullayev (AZE)	1

Quarterfinals
Yeldos Kamelov (KAZ)	0
Anri Putkaradze (GEO)	8
Imran Aliev (ANA)	10
Mohammad Mahdi Miri (IRI)	1

Semifinals
Anri Putkaradze (GEO)	0
Imran Aliev (ANA)	9

Repechage round 1
Imur Temirbekov (KGZ)	3
Ankit Gulia (IND)	10

Repechage round 2
Ognjen Jakovljević (SRB)	2
Muhammed Ali Göçmen (TUR)	9
Ankit Gulia (IND)	3
Mohammad Mahdi Miri (IRI)	5

Bronze medal match
Muhammed Ali Göçmen (TUR)	5
Aaron Bellscheidt (GER)	4
Mohammad Mahdi Miri (IRI)	1
Anri Putkaradze (GEO)	5

=== 77 kg ===
18 and 19 August

Legend

- F — Won by fall

Final

Final
Alexandru Solovei (MDA)	1
Alireza Abdevali (IRI)	1

Top half

Round of 32
Henrik Gevorgyan (ARM)	2
Erlan Mars Uulu (KGZ)	3
Chang Yang (CHN)	1
İlhan Aldı (TUR)	5
Ramazan Arapkhanov (ANA)	5
Ekke Leitham (EST)	0
Mateusz Borysewicz-Woźnicki (POL)	1
Mihael Lukač (CRO)	6
Alexandru Solovei (MDA)	4
Abdulmasih Abdulmasih (ANA)	0

Round of 16
Antal Vamoš (SRB)	0
Erlan Mars Uulu (KGZ)	8
İlhan Aldı (TUR)	1
Ramazan Arapkhanov (ANA)	3
Mahmoud Adel Ahmed (EGY)	4
Mihael Lukač (CRO)	6
Alexandru Solovei (MDA)	8
Derek Matthews (USA)	1

Quarterfinals
Erlan Mars Uulu (KGZ)	4
Ramazan Arapkhanov (ANA)	3
Mihael Lukač (CRO)	0
Alexandru Solovei (MDA)	11

Semifinals
Erlan Mars Uulu (KGZ)	3
Alexandru Solovei (MDA)	7

Bottom half

Round of 32
Deepak Punia (IND)	3
Martin Dimitrov (BUL)	1
Andreas Vasilakopoulos (GRE)	6
Dominik Botos (HUN)	1
Michal Zelenka (CZE)	2
Azimjon Soatullaev (UZB)	4
Ruslan Abdiiev (UKR)	3
Isami Horikita (JPN)	3
Davud Mammadov (AZE)	0
Tornike Mikeladze (GEO)	2

Round of 16
Alireza Abdevali (IRI)	8
Deepak Punia (IND)	0
Andreas Vasilakopoulos (GRE)	0
Ibrahim Tabaev (BEL)	9^{F}
Azimjon Soatullaev (UZB)	1
Ruslan Abdiiev (UKR)	10
Tornike Mikeladze (GEO)	3
Olzhas Yergali (KAZ)	1

Quarterfinals
Alireza Abdevali (IRI)	8
Ibrahim Tabaev (BEL)	0
Ruslan Abdiiev (UKR)	1
Tornike Mikeladze (GEO)	3

Semifinals
Alireza Abdevali (IRI)	3
Tornike Mikeladze (GEO)	1

Repechage round 1
Abdulmasih Abdulmasih (ANA)	10
Derek Matthews (USA)	1

Repechage round 2
Abdulmasih Abdulmasih (ANA)	5
Mihael Lukač (CRO)	3
Deepak Punia (IND)	6
Ibrahim Tabaev (BEL)	3

Bronze medal match
Abdulmasih Abdulmasih (ANA)	11
Erlan Mars Uulu (KGZ)	2
Deepak Punia (IND)	4
Tornike Mikeladze (GEO)	2

=== 82 kg ===
19 and 20 August

Legend

- F — Won by fall

Final

Final
Yasin Yazdi (IRI)	1
Alperen Berber (TUR)	9

Top half

Round of 32
Yasin Yazdi (IRI)	10
Imam Aliev (ANA)	5
Uladzislau Slabadzinski (ANA)	11
Mahmoud Hawsawi (KSA)	0
Brandon Guiadem Kamdem (FRA)	3
Reon Kakegawa (JPN)	3
Miklós Királyházi (HUN)	2
Ruben Gevorgyan (ARM)	5
Antonio Lukač (CRO)	1
Nicolaos Ignătescu (ROU)	6

Round of 16
Islam Yevloyev (KAZ)	8
Yasin Yazdi (IRI)	11
Uladzislau Slabadzinski (ANA)	0
Reon Kakegawa (JPN)	8
Andrey Atanasov (BUL)	3
Ruben Gevorgyan (ARM)	11^{F}
Nicolaos Ignătescu (ROU)	1
Branko Đukić (SRB)	3

Quarterfinals
Yasin Yazdi (IRI)	9
Reon Kakegawa (JPN)	1
Ruben Gevorgyan (ARM)	6
Branko Đukić (SRB)	1

Semifinals
Yasin Yazdi (IRI)	4
Ruben Gevorgyan (ARM)	0

Bottom half

Round of 32
Jesper Härkänen (FIN)	2
Mahmoud Ibrahim (EGY)	4
Dilshod Mamadaminov (UZB)	1
Data Chkhaidze (GEO)	11^{F}
Wojciech Iwanowski (POL)	5
Rohit Dahiya (IND)	4
Ilia Cernovol (MDA)	2
Ivan Chmyr (UKR)	9

Round of 16
Michael Altomer (USA)	2
Mahmoud Ibrahim (EGY)	4
Data Chkhaidze (GEO)	9
Christian Medina (MEX)	0
Alperen Berber (TUR)	10
Wojciech Iwanowski (POL)	0
Ivan Chmyr (UKR)	6
Ismail Rzayev (AZE)	1

Quarterfinals
Mahmoud Ibrahim (EGY)	3
Data Chkhaidze (GEO)	6
Alperen Berber (TUR)	3
Ivan Chmyr (UKR)	1

Semifinals
Data Chkhaidze (GEO)	0
Alperen Berber (TUR)	8

Repechage round 1
Imam Aliev (ANA)	7
Islam Yevloyev (KAZ)	0

Repechage round 2
Imam Aliev (ANA)	9
Reon Kakegawa (JPN)	1
Wojciech Iwanowski (POL)	2
Ivan Chmyr (UKR)	3

Bronze medal match
Imam Aliev (ANA)	4^{F}
Ruben Gevorgyan (ARM)	0
Ivan Chmyr (UKR)	1
Data Chkhaidze (GEO)	2

=== 87 kg ===
18 and 19 August

Legend

- F — Won by fall

Final

Final
Abolfazl Choubani (IRI)	1
Achiko Bolkvadze (GEO)	4

Top half

Round of 32
Ivaylo Ivanov (BUL)	4
Cha Yong-dae (KOR)	3
Yhlas Abdurazakow (TKM)	0
Wyatt Voelker (USA)	10
Mohit Khokhar (IND)	5
Csaba Szinay (HUN)	1
Vigen Nazaryan (ARM)	9
Daisei Isoe (JPN)	1
Nurassyl Amanaly (KAZ)	6^{F}
Erdem Kethüda (TUR)	4
David Andreasian (ANA)	9
Damian Matveiko (LTU)	0
Patrik Gordan (ROU)	8
Nikolaos Iosifidis (GRE)	1

Round of 16
Abolfazl Choubani (IRI)	8
Ivaylo Ivanov (BUL)	0
Wyatt Voelker (USA)	6
Mohit Khokhar (IND)	3
Vigen Nazaryan (ARM)	3
Nurassyl Amanaly (KAZ)	1
David Andreasian (ANA)	5
Patrik Gordan (ROU)	3

Quarterfinals
Abolfazl Choubani (IRI)	7
Wyatt Voelker (USA)	1
Vigen Nazaryan (ARM)	1
David Andreasian (ANA)	1

Semifinals
Abolfazl Choubani (IRI)	1
Vigen Nazaryan (ARM)	1

Bottom half

Round of 32
Asan Zhanyshov (KGZ)	9
Ramazan Pashaiev (UKR)	2
Uroš Krstin (SRB)	0
Tomislav Brkan (CRO)	6
Kareem El-Desouky (EGY)	0
Achiko Bolkvadze (GEO)	10
Abdullokh Abdumutalibov (UZB)	1
Robin Uspenski (EST)	9
Elias Lyyski (FIN)	7
Maksim Masiukevich (ANA)	3
Tourpal Ali Magamadov (FRA)	6
Cao Xiang (CHN)	3

Round of 16
Patryk Robaszek (POL)	0
Asan Zhanyshov (KGZ)	10
Tomislav Brkan (CRO)	0
Achiko Bolkvadze (GEO)	9
Robin Uspenski (EST)	3
Elias Lyyski (FIN)	6
Tourpal Ali Magamadov (FRA)	9
Ali Guliyev (AZE)	8

Quarterfinals
Asan Zhanyshov (KGZ)	1
Achiko Bolkvadze (GEO)	9
Elias Lyyski (FIN)	1
Tourpal Ali Magamadov (FRA)	5

Semifinals
Achiko Bolkvadze (GEO)	10
Tourpal Ali Magamadov (FRA)	2

Repechage round 1
Kareem El-Desouky (EGY)	4
Tomislav Brkan (CRO)	7

Repechage round 2
Ivaylo Ivanov (BUL)	2
Wyatt Voelker (USA)	3
Tomislav Brkan (CRO)	1
Asan Zhanyshov (KGZ)	10

Bronze medal match
Wyatt Voelker (USA)	0
Vigen Nazaryan (ARM)	7
Asan Zhanyshov (KGZ)	13
Tourpal Ali Magamadov (FRA)	4

=== 97 kg ===
19 and 20 August

Legend

- F — Won by fall

Final

Final
Gor Ayvazyan (GEO)	0
Abubakar Khaslakhanau (ANA)	8

Top half

Round of 32
Muhittin Helvacı (TUR)	0
Rostislav Covali (MDA)	3
Igor Kabadeicev (LTU)	1
Juan Díaz (VEN)	10
Arshak Geghamyan (ARM)	8
Samagan Ormonov (KGZ)	0
Gor Ayvazyan (GEO)	7
Yun Dong-hyun (KOR)	1

Round of 16
Ýusup Belliýew (TKM)	0
Rostislav Covali (MDA)	8
Juan Díaz (VEN)	2
Sawyer Bartelt (USA)	2
Nurtaz Kydyrbay (KAZ)	0
Arshak Geghamyan (ARM)	7^{F}
Gor Ayvazyan (GEO)	8
Vladyslav Lub (UKR)	0

Quarterfinals
Rostislav Covali (MDA)	8
Juan Díaz (VEN)	0
Arshak Geghamyan (ARM)	1
Gor Ayvazyan (GEO)	3

Semifinals
Rostislav Covali (MDA)	1
Gor Ayvazyan (GEO)	3

Bottom half

Round of 32
Gean Ali (ROU)	4
Wei Tao (CHN)	7
Amir Reza Akbari (IRI)	6
Darius Kiefer (GER)	1
Sahil Ahlawat (IND)	4
Sebastian Warchoł (POL)	13
Kyo Kitawaki (JPN)	0
Kevin Uspenski (EST)	9

Round of 16
Magomed Mukhtarov (ANA)	8
Wei Tao (CHN)	0
Amir Reza Akbari (IRI)	0
Abubakar Khaslakhanau (ANA)	5^{F}
Damirkhon Rakhmatov (UZB)	0
Sebastian Warchoł (POL)	9
Kevin Uspenski (EST)	3
Kaloyan Ivanov (BUL)	2

Quarterfinals
Magomed Mukhtarov (ANA)	3
Abubakar Khaslakhanau (ANA)	12
Sebastian Warchoł (POL)	1
Kevin Uspenski (EST)	3^{F}

Semifinals
Abubakar Khaslakhanau (ANA)	14
Kevin Uspenski (EST)	2

Repechage round 1
Yun Dong-hyun (KOR)	5
Vladyslav Lub (UKR)	1

Repechage round 2
Yun Dong-hyun (KOR)	5
Arshak Geghamyan (ARM)	6
Amir Reza Akbari (IRI)	3
Magomed Mukhtarov (ANA)	13

Bronze medal match
Arshak Geghamyan (ARM)	5
Rostislav Covali (MDA)	5^{F}
Magomed Mukhtarov (ANA)	8
Kevin Uspenski (EST)	0

=== 130 kg ===
18 and 19 August

Legend

- F — Won by fall

Final

Final
Fardin Hedayati (IRI)	8
Jiang Wenhao (CHN)	0

Top half

Round of 32
Fekry Eisa (EGY)	9
Mazaim Mardanov (AZE)	0

Round of 16
Leonhard Junger (AUT)	1
Artur Boichuk (UKR)	4^{F}
Fekry Eisa (EGY)	6
Daniil Kazlou (ANA)	2
Talip Çiftçi (TUR)	8
Jokhar Uzarov (KAZ)	0
Aramayis Harutyunyan (ARM)	0
Fardin Hedayati (IRI)	8

Quarterfinals
Artur Boichuk (UKR)	1
Fekry Eisa (EGY)	7
Talip Çiftçi (TUR)	0
Fardin Hedayati (IRI)	8

Semifinals
Fekry Eisa (EGY)	0
Fardin Hedayati (IRI)	8

Bottom half

Round of 32
Ayumu Iwasawa (JPN)	1
Aden Attao (USA)	3

Round of 16
Aleksandr Melekhov (ANA)	0
Jiang Wenhao (CHN)	6
Luka Gabisonia (GEO)	8
Parvesh (IND)	0
Koppány László (HUN)	7
Aden Attao (USA)	8
Achilleas Chrysidis (GRE)	7
Eerik Pank (EST)	3

Quarterfinals
Jiang Wenhao (CHN)	13
Luka Gabisonia (GEO)	4
Aden Attao (USA)	4
Achilleas Chrysidis (GRE)	6

Semifinals
Jiang Wenhao (CHN)	13
Achilleas Chrysidis (GRE)	2

Repechage round 2
Aramayis Harutyunyan (ARM)	0
Talip Çiftçi (TUR)	7
Aleksandr Melekhov (ANA)	9^{F}
Luka Gabisonia (GEO)	3

Bronze medal match
Talip Çiftçi (TUR)	2
Fekry Eisa (EGY)	3
Aleksandr Melekhov (ANA)	0
Achilleas Chrysidis (GRE)	5

== See also ==
- 2023 World Junior Wrestling Championships – Men's freestyle
- 2023 World Junior Wrestling Championships – Women's freestyle
