= Kayakent =

Kayakent Каякент Къаягент
- Selo
- Location within Republic of Dagestan Location within Russia
- Coordinates: 42°23′N 47°54′E
- Country: Russia
- Region: Republic of Dagestan
- District: Kayakentsky District
- Time zone: UTC+3:00

Kayakent (Russian: Каякент; Kumyk: Къаягент, Qayagent) is a rural locality (a selo) and the administrative centre of Kayakentsky Selsoviet, Kayakentsky District, Republic of Dagestan, Russia. The population was 11,144 as of 2010. There are 90 streets.

== Geography ==
Kayakent is located 10 km west of Novokayakent (the district's administrative centre) by road, on the left bank of the Gamriozen River. Usemikent and Shalasi are the nearest rural localities.
