= Usemikent =

Usemikent Усемикент
- Selo
- Location within Republic of Dagestan Location within Russia
- Coordinates: 42°23′N 47°52′E
- Country: Russia
- Region: Republic of Dagestan
- District: Kayakentsky District
- Time zone: UTC+3:00

Usemikent (Russian: Усемикент) is a rural locality (a selo) in Kayakentsky District, Republic of Dagestan, Russia. The population was 1,996 as of 2010. There are 44 streets.

== Geography ==
Usemikent is located 14 km west of Novokayakent (the district's administrative centre) by road. Kayakent and Shalasi are the nearest rural localities.

== Nationalities ==
Kumyks live there.
