= Alkhadzhakent =

Alkhadzhakent Алхаджакент Алходжагент
- Selo
- Location within Republic of Dagestan Location within Russia
- Coordinates: 42°20′N 47°47′E
- Country: Russia
- Region: Republic of Dagestan
- District: Kayakentsky District
- Time zone: UTC+3:00

Alkhadzhakent (Russian: Алхаджакент; Kumyk: Алходжагент, Alxocagent) is a rural locality (a selo) and the administrative centre of Alkhadzhakentsky Selsoviet, Kayakentsky District, Republic of Dagestan, Russia. The population was 2,411 as of 2010. There are 25 streets.

== Geography ==
Alkhadzhakent is located 23 km southwest of Izberbash. Mamaaul and Usemikent are the nearest rural localities.

== Nationalities ==
Kumyks live there.

== Famous residents ==
- Sheykh Ismailov (Doctor of Biological Sciences)
