= Ibragim Kadiev =

Russian freestyle wrestler

Personal information
- Native name: Ибрагим Магомедрашидович Кадиев
- Full name: Ibragim Magomedrashidovich Kadiev
- Born: 12 April 2004 (age 22) Usemikent, Kayakentsky District, Dagestan, Russia

Sport
- Country: Russia
- Sport: Wrestling
- Weight class: 86kg
- Rank: International master of sports in freestyle wrestling
- Event: Freestyle
- Club: Abdularashud Sadulaev's wrestling club
- Coached by: Eldar Nazhmudinov, Zubairugadzhi Kerimov

Achievements and titles
- National finals: (gold) (2024), (gold) (2025), (gold) (2026)
Medal record
Men's freestyle wrestling
Representing UWW
European Championships
Gold medal – first place	2026 Tirana	86 kg
Grand Prix
Gold medal – first place	2026 Tirana	86 kg
Representing Individual Neutral Athletes
World U20 Championships
Gold medal – first place	2023 Amman	79 kg
Gold medal – first place	2024 Pontevedra	86 kg
European U20 Championships
Gold medal – first place	2024 Novi Sad	86 kg
Representing Dagestan
Golden Grand Prix Ivan Yarygin
Gold medal – first place	2026 Krasnoyarsk	86 kg
Ali Aliyev Memorial
Gold medal – first place	2025 Kaspiysk	86 kg
Russian National Championships
Gold medal – first place	2024 Novoivanovskoye	86 kg
Gold medal – first place	2025 Moscow	86 kg
Gold medal – first place	2026 Odintsovo	86 kg

Ibragim Magomedrashidovich Kadiev (Russian: Ибрагим Магомедрашидович Кадиев; born 12 April 2004) is a Russian freestyle wrestler who competes in the 86 kilogram class. In 2024, he became the Russian National champion and the U20 World champion, feat he had first accomplished in 2023 at 79 kilograms.

== Background ==
Kadiev was born on 12 April 2004 in Kayakentsky District, Dagestan, Russia but now resides in Makhachkala. Kadiev is of Kumyk heritage.

== Career ==
He has a junior national bronze medal in 2022. In 2023, he won the junior Russian nationals in Yakutsk and the junior world championships in Amman, Jordan. In April 2024, he came first at the junior Russian nationals again.

In May 2024, he became a senior Russian national champion at 86 kilos, where he beat senior national champion Arslan Bagev of North Ossetia, world champion Akhmed Usmanov of Dagestan, world bronze medalist Vladislav Valiev from North Ossetia and Malik Shavaev from Kabardino-Balkaria. For a second time, Kadiev placed first in the Russian senior nationals in Moscow, defeating Artur Naifonov in the final in a closely contested match.

In January 2026, Kadiev won his first gold at the Ivan Yarygin Golden Grand Prix which secured him a spot on the Russian squad headed to the European championships. In February, he then took first place at the ranking series in Tirana before headed to his first senior European championships in Tirana, Albania. He took first place, after defeating Göçen, Gamkrelidze and in the final, Arsenii Dzhioev of Azerbaijan, in a close match.

== Championships and achievements ==
- Senior level:
  - 2026 Russian national championships - 1st.
  - 2026 European Championships - 1st.
  - 2026 Ranking Series - Tirana - 1st.
  - 2026 Ivan Yarygin Golden Grand Prix - 1st.
  - 2025 Russian national championships - 1st.
  - 2025 Ali Aliev Memorial - 1st.
  - 2024 Russian national championships - 1st.
- Junior and U23 level:
  - 2022 Russian championships — 3rd.
  - 2023 Russian championships — 1st.
  - 2023 World championships — 1st.
  - 2023 U23 Russian championships — 2nd.
  - 2024 Russian championships — 1st.
