= 2024 U23 World Wrestling Championships – Men's Greco-Roman 130 kg =

Wrestling competitions

Men's Greco-Roman 130 kg at the 2024 U23 World Championships
- Venue: Tirana Olympic Park
- Dates: 22–23 October
- Competitors: 21 from 19 nations

Medalists
gold medal	Fardin Hedayati	Iran
silver medal	Dmitrii Baboryko	Authorised Neutral Athletes
bronze medal	Koppány László	Hungary
bronze medal	Giorgi Tsopurashvili	Georgia

The men's Greco-Roman 130 kilograms is a competition featured at the 2024 U23 World Wrestling Championships, and will be held in Tirana, Albania on 22 and 23 October 2024.

This Greco-Roman wrestling competition consists of a single-elimination tournament, with a repechage used to determine the winner of two bronze medals. The two finalists face off for gold and silver medals. Each wrestler who loses to one of the two finalists moves into the repechage, culminating in a pair of bronze medal matches featuring the semifinal losers each facing the remaining repechage opponent from their half of the bracket.

== Results ==
Legend

- F — Won by fall

=== Final ===
Final
Fardin Hedayati (IRI)	6
Dmitrii Baboryko (AIN)	0

=== Top half ===
Round of 32
Fardin Hedayati (IRI)	8
Hamza Bakır (TUR)	0
Fekry Eissa (EGY)	0
Assylbek Abdikalyk (KAZ)	4^{F}
He Jianqun (CHN)	3
Koei Yamada (JPN)	1

Round of 16
Pavel Hlinchuk (AIN)	5
Sarkhan Mammadov (AZE)	4
Fardin Hedayati (IRI)	12
Mykhailo Vyshnyvetskyi (UKR)	4
Nikolaos Ntounias (GRE)	8
Assylbek Abdikalyk (KAZ)	0
He Jianqun (CHN)	0
Koppány László (HUN)	4

Quarterfinals
Pavel Hlinchuk (AIN)	0
Fardin Hedayati (IRI)	5
Nikolaos Ntounias (GRE)	2
Koppány László (HUN)	3

Semifinals
Fardin Hedayati (IRI)	9
Koppány László (HUN)	0

=== Bottom half ===
Round of 32
Uttam Rana (IND)	2
Tomasz Wawrzynczyk (POL)	8^{F}
Albert Vardanyan (ARM)	8
Eerik Pank (EST)	0

Round of 16
Dmitrii Baboryko (AIN)	1
Giorgi Tsopurashvili (GEO)	1
Tomasz Wawrzyńczyk (POL)	3
Keith Miley (USA)	5
Marcel Albini (CZE)	1
Albert Vardanyan (ARM)	3
Rostislav Covali (MDA)	0
Erlan Manatbekov (KGZ)	8

Quarterfinals
Dmitrii Baboryko (AIN)	8
Keith Miley (USA)	0
Albert Vardanyan (ARM)	8
Erlan Manatbekov (KGZ)	1

Semifinals
Dmitrii Baboryko (AIN)	9^{F}
Albert Vardanyan (ARM)	1

=== Repechage ===
Repechage round 1
Hamza Bakır (TUR)	1
Mykhailo Vyshnyvetskyi (UKR)	5^{F}

Repechage round 2
Mykhailo Vyshnyvetskyi (UKR)	0
Pavel Hlinchuk (AIN)	8
Giorgi Tsopurashvili (GEO)	5
Keith Miley (USA)	0

Bronze medals
Pavel Hlinchuk (AIN)	1
Koppány László (HUN)	9
Giorgi Tsopurashvili (GEO)	1
Albert Vardanyan (ARM)	1

== Final standing ==
Rank	Athlete
1st place, gold medalist(s)	Fardin Hedayati (IRI)
2nd place, silver medalist(s)	{ Dmitrii Baboryko (AIN)
3rd place, bronze medalist(s)	Koppány László (HUN)
3rd place, bronze medalist(s)	Giorgi Tsopurashvili (GEO)
5	Pavel Hlinchuk (AIN)
5	Albert Vardanyan (ARM)
7	Tomasz Wawrzynczyk (POL)
8	Mykhailo Vyshnyvetskyi (UKR)
9	Assylbek Abdikalyk (KAZ)
10	Nikolaos Ntounias (GRE)
11	Erlan Manatbekov (KGZ)
12	Keith Miley (USA)
13	He Jianqun (CHN)
14	Sarkhan Mammadov (AZE)
15	Koei Yamada (JPN)
16	Marcel Albini (CZE)
17	Uttam Rana (IND)
18	Hamza Bakır (TUR)
19	Fekry Eissa (EGY)
20	Eerik Pank (EST)
21	Rostislav Covali (MDA)
