= 2023 U23 World Wrestling Championships – Men's freestyle 86 kg =

Wrestling competitions

Men's freestyle 86 kg at the 2023 U23 World Championships
- Venue: Tirana Olympic Park
- Dates: 23–24 October
- Competitors: 22 from 19 nations

Medalists
gold medal	Aaron Brooks	United States
silver medal	Tatsuya Shirai	Japan
bronze medal	Arslan Bagaev	Authorised Neutral Athletes
bronze medal	Joshua Morodion	Germany

The men's freestyle 86 kg is a competition featured at the 2023 U23 World Wrestling Championships, and was held in Tirana, Albania on 23 and 24 October 2023.

This freestyle wrestling competition consists of a single-elimination tournament, with a repechage used to determine the winner of two bronze medals. The two finalists face off for gold and silver medals. Each wrestler who loses to one of the two finalists moves into the repechage, culminating in a pair of bronze medal matches featuring the semifinal losers each facing the remaining repechage opponent from their half of the bracket.

== Results ==
Legend

- F — Won by fall
- WO — Won by walkover

=== Final ===
Final
Aaron Brooks (USA)	10
Tatsuya Shirai (JPN)	0

=== Top half ===
Round of 32
Angelos Kouklaris (GRE)	0
Arslan Bagaev (ANA)	10
İsmail Küçüksolak (TUR)	1
Aaron Brooks (USA)	7
Oleksandr Mamrosh (UKR)	13
Adam Modosjan (MKD)	2

Round of 16
Arsenii Dzhioev (AZE)	10
Mushegh Mkrtchyan (ARM)	0
Arslan Bagaev (ANA)	11
Erzo Isakov (JOR)	0
Owen Martin (CAN)	0
Aaron Brooks (USA)	10
Oleksandr Mamrosh (UKR)	0
Ivan Ichizli (MDA)	11

Quarterfinals
Arsenii Dzhioev (AZE)	0
Arslan Bagaev (ANA)	6
Aaron Brooks (USA)	7
Ivan Ichizli (MDA)	0

Semifinals
Arslan Bagaev (ANA)	4
Aaron Brooks (USA)	5

=== Bottom half ===
Round of 32
Tatsuya Shirai (JPN)	8
Igor Szucki (POL)	0
Daviti Koguashvili (GEO)	12
Charalampos Choiras (CYP)	2
Nurdaulet Kuanyshbay (KAZ)	1
Ilya Khamtsou (ANA)	6

Round of 16
Joshua Morodion (GER)	1
Tatsuya Shirai (JPN)	4
Daviti Koguashvili (GEO)	5
Miko Elkala (FIN)	5
Deepak Mirka (UWW)	2
Ilya Khamtsou (ANA)	7
~~Altin Ganci (ALB)~~
Benjamin Greil (AUT)	WO

Quarterfinals
Tatsuya Shirai (JPN)	6
Miko Elkala (FIN)	0
Ilya Khamtsou (ANA)	0
Benjamin Greil (AUT)	5

Semifinals
Tatsuya Shirai (JPN)	4
Benjamin Greil (AUT)	0

=== Repechage ===
Repechage round 1
İsmail Küçüksolak (TUR)	10
Owen Martin (CAN)	0
Igor Szucki (POL)	0
Joshua Morodion (GER)	5

Repechage round 2
İsmail Küçüksolak (TUR)	3
Ivan Ichizli (MDA)	7
Joshua Morodion (GER)	12
Miko Elkala (FIN)	1

Bronze medals
Ivan Ichizli (MDA)	1
Arslan Bagaev (ANA)	6
Joshua Morodion (GER)	9
Benjamin Greil (AUT)	2
