= 2026 World Wrestling Championships – Men's Greco-Roman 130 kg =

Wrestling competitions

Men's Greco-Roman 130 kg at the 2026 World Championships
- Venue: Barys Arena
- Dates: 25–26 October 2026
- Competitors: 26 from 26 nations

Medalists
gold medal	Fardin Hedayati	Iran
silver medal	Dárius Vitek	Hungary
bronze medal	Pavel Hlinchuk	Belarus
bronze medal	Jiang Wenhao	China

The men's Greco-Roman 130 kilograms is a competition featured at the 2026 World Wrestling Championships, and was held in Astana, Kazakhstan on 25 and 26 October 2026.

This Greco-Roman wrestling competition consists of a single-elimination tournament, with a repechage used to determine the winner of two bronze medals. The two finalists face off for gold and silver medals. Each wrestler who loses to one of the two finalists moves into the repechage, culminating in a pair of bronze medal matches, featuring the semifinal losers each facing the remaining repechage opponent from their half of the bracket.

== Results ==
Legend

- R — Retired
- WO — Won by walkover

=== Final ===
Final
Dárius Vitek (HUN)	0
Fardin Hedayati (IRI)	8

=== Top half ===
Round of 32
Razmik Kurdyan (ARM)	0^{R}
Heiki Nabi (EST)	1
Ilkham Tokhtaev (KGZ)	0
Rafael Tsitsuashvili (UZB)	7
Sulkhan Buidze (GEO)	9
Kim Min-seok (KOR)	0
Artur Sarkisjan (CZE)	1
Abdellatif Mohamed (EGY)	6
Guilherme Evangelista (BRA)	0
Sarkhan Mammadov (AZE)	11

Round of 16
Dárius Vitek (HUN)	1
Heiki Nabi (EST)	1
Rafael Tsitsuashvili (UZB)	1
Sulkhan Buidze (GEO)	1
Cohlton Schultz (USA)	1
Abdellatif Mohamed (EGY)	1
Sarkhan Mammadov (AZE)	2
Pavel Hlinchuk (BLR)	6

Quarterfinals
Dárius Vitek (HUN)	4
Rafael Tsitsuashvili (UZB)	0
Abdellatif Mohamed (EGY)	9
Pavel Hlinchuk (BLR)	19

Semifinals
Dárius Vitek (HUN)	5
Pavel Hlinchuk (BLR)	0

=== Bottom half ===
Round of 32
Moisés Pérez (VEN)	0
Sergey Semenov (RUS)	9
Fardin Hedayati (IRI)	4
Romas Fridrikas (LTU)	0^{R}
Rıza Kayaalp (TUR)	9
Joginder Rathee (IND)	0
Franz Richter (GER)	5
Mykhailo Vyshnyvetskyi (UKR)	5
Yuta Nara (JPN)	0
Danila Sotnikov (ITA)	9

Round of 16
Jiang Wenhao (CHN)	4
Sergey Semenov (RUS)	3
Fardin Hedayati (IRI)	8
Olzhas Syrlybay (KAZ)	0
Rıza Kayaalp (TUR)	4
Mykhailo Vyshnyvetskyi (UKR)	0
Danila Sotnikov (ITA)	4
Elias Kuosmanen (FIN)	5

Quarterfinals
Jiang Wenhao (CHN)	0
Fardin Hedayati (IRI)	9
Rıza Kayaalp (TUR)	3
Elias Kuosmanen (FIN)	5

Semifinals
Fardin Hedayati (IRI)	9
Elias Kuosmanen (FIN)	0

=== Repechage ===
Repechage round 1
Romas Fridrikas (LTU)
Olzhas Syrlybay (KAZ)	WO

Repechage round 2
Heiki Nabi (EST)	1
Rafael Tsitsuashvili (UZB)	1
Olzhas Syrlybay (KAZ)	0
Jiang Wenhao (CHN)	2

Bronze medals
Rafael Tsitsuashvili (UZB)	1
Pavel Hlinchuk (BLR)	3
Jiang Wenhao (CHN)	9
Elias Kuosmanen (FIN)	4

== Final standing ==
Rank	Athlete
1st place, gold medalist(s)	Fardin Hedayati (IRI)
2nd place, silver medalist(s)	Dárius Vitek (HUN)
3rd place, bronze medalist(s)	Pavel Hlinchuk (BLR)
3rd place, bronze medalist(s)	Jiang Wenhao (CHN)
5	Rafael Tsitsuashvili (UZB)
5	Elias Kuosmanen (FIN)
7	Rıza Kayaalp (TUR)
8	Abdellatif Mohamed (EGY)
9	Heiki Nabi (EST)
10	Danila Sotnikov (ITA)
11	Sarkhan Mammadov (AZE)
12	Sergey Semenov (RUS)
13	Sulkhan Buidze (GEO)
14	Olzhas Syrlybay (KAZ)
15	Mykhailo Vyshnyvetskyi (UKR)
16	Franz Richter (GER)
17	Cohlton Schultz (USA)
18	Artur Sarkisjan (CZE)
19	Razmik Kurdyan (ARM)
20	Romas Fridrikas (LTU)
21	Ilkham Tokhtaev (KGZ)
22	Kim Min-seok (KOR)
23	Moisés Pérez (VEN)
24	Joginder Rathee (IND)
25	Yuta Nara (JPN)
26	Guilherme Evangelista (BRA)
