= 2026 European Wrestling Championships – Men's freestyle 86 kg =

Wrestling competition

Men's freestyle 86 kg at the 2026 European Wrestling Championships
- Venue: Tirana Olympic Park
- Location: Tirana, Albania
- Dates: 25-26 April
- Competitors: 18

Medalists
gold medal	Ibragim Kadiev
silver medal	Arsenii Dzhioev	Azerbaijan
bronze medal	Eugeniu Mihalcean	Moldova
bronze medal	Vladimer Gamkrelidze	Georgia

The men's freestyle 86 kg is a competition featured at the 2026 European Wrestling Championships, and was held in Tirana, Albania on April 25 and 26.

== Results ==
Legend

- F — Won by fall
- WO — Won by walkover

=== Final ===
Final
Arsenii Dzhioev (AZE)	1
Ibragim Kadiev (UWW)	2

=== Top half ===
Round of 32
Eugeniu Mihalcean (MDA)	8
Miko Elkala (FIN)	0

Round of 16
Arsenii Dzhioev (AZE)	10
Denys Bykov (UKR)	0
Eugeniu Mihalcean (MDA)	11
Gabriel Iglesias (ESP)	1
Boris Makoev (SVK)	2
Umar Mavlaev (SUI)	8
Simon Marchl (AUT)	2
Ivars Samušonoks (LAT)	5

Quarterfinals
Arsenii Dzhioev (AZE)	11
Eugeniu Mihalcean (MDA)	0
Umar Mavlaev (SUI)	1
Ivars Samušonoks (LAT)	13

Semifinals
Arsenii Dzhioev (AZE)	12
Ivars Samušonoks (LAT)	2

=== Bottom half ===
Round of 32
Osman Göçen (TUR)	11
Engin Ismail (BUL)	0

Round of 16
Rakhim Magamadov (FRA)	1
Vladimer Gamkrelidze (GEO)	9
Joshua Morodion (GER)	11
Cezary Sadowski (POL)	0
Georgios Kougioumtsidis (GRE)	3
Osman Göçen (TUR)	5
~~Mate Kola (ALB)~~
Ibragim Kadiev (UWW)	WO

Quarterfinals
Vladimer Gamkrelidze (GEO)	7
Joshua Morodion (GER)	3
Osman Göçen (TUR)	6
Ibragim Kadiev (UWW)	7

Semifinals
Vladimer Gamkrelidze (GEO)	4
Ibragim Kadiev (UWW)	9

=== Repechage ===
Repechage round 1
Denys Bykov (UKR)	0
Eugeniu Mihalcean (MDA)	4
~~Mate Kola (ALB)~~
Osman Göçen (TUR)	WO

Bronze medal matches
Eugeniu Mihalcean (MDA)	7
Ivars Samušonoks (LAT)	2
Osman Göçen (TUR)	1
Vladimer Gamkrelidze (GEO)	8

== Final standing ==
Rank	Athlete
1st place, gold medalist(s)	Ibragim Kadiev (UWW)
2nd place, silver medalist(s)	Arsenii Dzhioev (AZE)
3rd place, bronze medalist(s)	Eugeniu Mihalcean (MDA)
3rd place, bronze medalist(s)	Vladimer Gamkrelidze (GEO)
5	Ivars Samušonoks (LAT)
5	Osman Göçen (TUR)
7	Joshua Morodion (GER)
8	Umar Mavlaev (SUI)
9	Georgios Kougioumtsidis (GRE)
10	Simon Marchl (AUT)
11	Boris Makoev (SVK)
12	Rakhim Magamadov (FRA)
13	Gabriel Iglesias (ESP)
14	Miko Elkala (FIN)
15	Cezary Sadowski (POL)
16	Engin Ismail (BUL)
17	Denys Bykov (UKR)
—	Mate Kola (ALB)
