= Mohammad Mobin Azimi =

Iranian freestyle wrestler

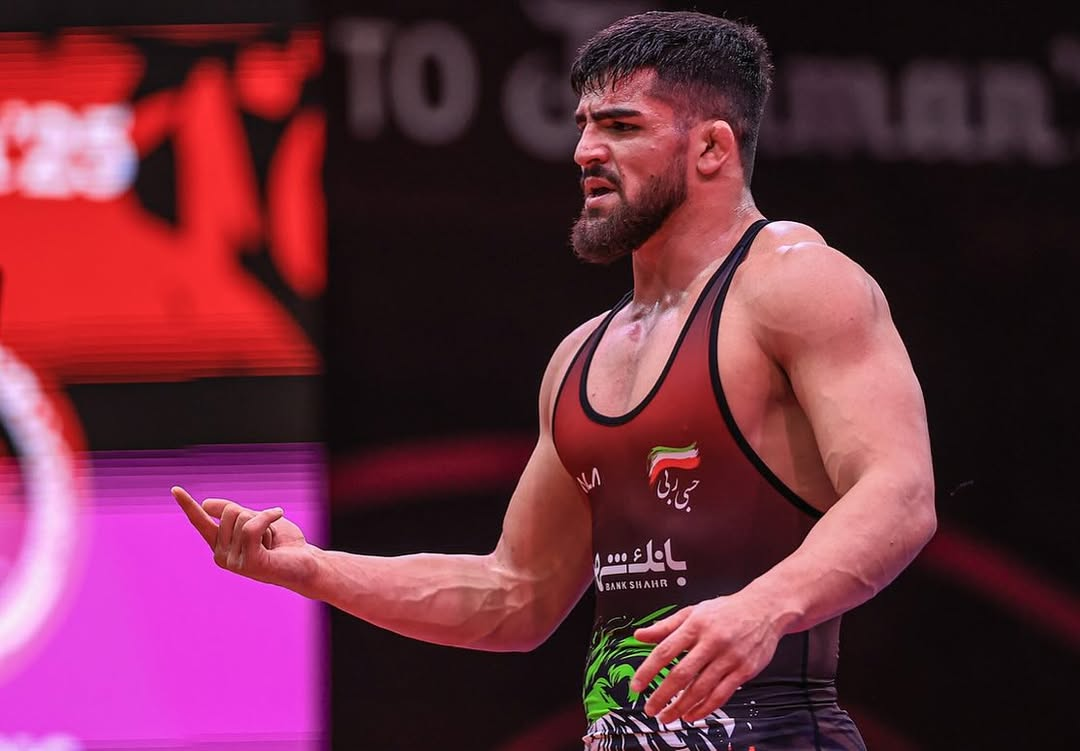
- Azimi in 2025 Asian Wrestling Championships

Personal information
- Full name: Mohammad Mobin Gholamali Azimi
- Nationality: Iranian
- Born: 10 May 2002 (age 24) Saqqez, Kurdistan Province, Iran
- Height: 183 cm (6 ft 0 in)

Sport
- Country: Iran
- Sport: Freestyle wrestling
- Coached by: Pejman Dorostkar
Medal record
Representing Iran
Asian Championships
Gold medal – first place	2026 Bishkek	92 kg
Bronze medal – third place	2025 Amman	97 kg
Yasar Dogu Tournament
Gold medal – first place	2023 Istanbul	92 kg
Dan Kolov & Nikola Petrov Tournament
Gold medal – first place	2024 Sofia	92 kg
Grand Prix
Gold medal – first place	2026 Zagreb	92 kg
World U23 Championships
Gold medal – first place	2025 Novi Sad	92 kg
Bronze medal – third place	2026 Las Vegas	97 kg
World Junior Championships
Gold medal – first place	2023 Amman	92 kg

Mohammad Mobin Gholamali Azimi (Persian: محمدمبین عظیمی, born 10 May 2002) is a freestyle wrestler from Iran.

== Career ==
Competing in the 92 kg division he won a bronze medal at the 2025 Asia Championships and a gold medal at the 2023 World Junior Championships. He also won gold medal at the 2018, 2022 and 2023 Asia junior championship.
