= 2024 European Wrestling Championships – Men's Greco-Roman 130 kg =

Wrestling competition

Men's Greco-Roman 130 kg at the 2024 European Wrestling Championships
- Venue: Polyvalent Hall
- Location: Bucharest, Romania
- Dates: 12-13 February
- Competitors: 18

Medalists
gold medal	Sergey Semenov
silver medal	Rıza Kayaalp	Turkey
bronze medal	Beka Kandelaki	Azerbaijan
bronze medal	Danila Sotnikov	Italy

The Men's Greco-Roman 130 kg is a competition featured at the 2024 European Wrestling Championships, and was held in Bucharest, Romania on February 12 and 13.

== Results ==
Legend

- F — Won by fall

=== Final ===
Final
Rıza Kayaalp (TUR)	2
Sergey Semenov (AIN)	4^{F}

=== Top half ===
Round of 32
Delian Alishahi (SUI)	0
David Ovasapyan (ARM)	6

Round of 16
Rıza Kayaalp (TUR)	9
Oskar Marvik (NOR)	0
David Ovasapyan (ARM)	5
Boris Petrušić (SRB)	0
Konsta Mäenpää (FIN)	6
Beka Kandelaki (AZE)	8
Dáriusz Vitek (HUN)	1
Heiki Nabi (EST)	1

Quarterfinals
Rıza Kayaalp (TUR)	5
David Ovasapyan (ARM)	0
Beka Kandelaki (AZE)	9
Dáriusz Vitek (HUN)	0

Semifinals
Rıza Kayaalp (TUR)	2
Beka Kandelaki (AZE)	2

=== Bottom half ===
Round of 32
Apostolos Tsiovolos (GRE)	1
Artsiom Shumski (POL)	5
Mantas Knystautas (LTU)	1
Sergey Semenov (AIN)	3

Round of 16
~~Iakobi Kajaia (GEO)~~	5
Franz Richter (GER)	1
Artsiom Shumski (POL)	0
Alin Alexuc-Ciurariu (ROU)	8
Danila Sotnikov (ITA)	1
Sergey Semenov (AIN)	3
Dzmitry Zarubski (AIN)	10
Mykhailo Vyshnyvetskyi (UKR)	0

Quarterfinals
~~Iakobi Kajaia (GEO)~~	5
Alin Alexuc-Ciurariu (ROU)	1
Sergey Semenov (AIN)	9
Dzmitry Zarubski (AIN)	0

Semifinals
~~Iakobi Kajaia (GEO)~~	1
Sergey Semenov (AIN)	2

=== Repechage ===
Repechage round 1
Mantas Knystautas (LTU)	1
Danila Sotnikov (ITA)	4

Repechage round 2
Oskar Marvik (NOR)	3
David Ovasapyan (ARM)	2
Danila Sotnikov (ITA)	4
Dzmitry Zarubski (AIN)	2

Bronze medal match
Oskar Marvik (NOR)	2
Beka Kandelaki (AZE)	2
Danila Sotnikov (ITA)	9^{F}
~~Iakobi Kajaia (GEO)~~	3

== Final standing ==
Rank	Athlete
1st place, gold medalist(s)	Sergey Semenov (AIN)
2nd place, silver medalist(s)	Rıza Kayaalp (TUR)
3rd place, bronze medalist(s)	Beka Kandelaki (AZE)
3rd place, bronze medalist(s)	Danila Sotnikov (ITA)
5	Oskar Marvik (NOR)
6	David Ovasapyan (ARM)
7	Dzmitry Zarubski (AIN)
8	Alin Alexuc-Ciurariu (ROU)
9	Artsiom Shumski (POL)
10	Dáriusz Vitek (HUN)
11	Mantas Knystautas (LTU)
12	Konsta Mäenpää (FIN)
13	Heiki Nabi (EST)
14	Franz Richter (GER)
15	Apostolos Tsiovolos (GRE)
16	Boris Petrušić (SRB)
17	Delian Alishahi (SUI)
18	Mykhailo Vyshnyvetskyi (UKR)
DQ	Iakobi Kajaia (GEO)
