= 2024 U23 World Wrestling Championships – Men's freestyle 86 kg =

Wrestling competitions

Men's freestyle 86 kg at the 2024 U23 World Championships
- Venue: Tirana Olympic Park
- Dates: 25–26 October
- Competitors: 27 from 25 nations

Medalists
gold medal	Arslan Bagaev	Authorised Neutral Athletes
silver medal	Arsenii Dzhioev	Azerbaijan
bronze medal	Eugeniu Mihalcean	Moldova
bronze medal	Yudai Takahashi	Japan

The men's freestyle 86 kilograms is a competition featured at the 2024 U23 World Wrestling Championships, and will be held in Tirana, Albania on 25 and 26 October 2024.

This freestyle wrestling competition consists of a single-elimination tournament, with a repechage used to determine the winner of two bronze medals. The two finalists face off for gold and silver medals. Each wrestler who loses to one of the two finalists moves into the repechage, culminating in a pair of bronze medal matches featuring the semifinal losers each facing the remaining repechage opponent from their half of the bracket.

== Results ==
Legend

- F — Won by fall
- R — Retired

=== Final ===
Final
Arslan Bagaev (AIN)	6
Arsenii Dzhioev (AZE)	3

=== Top half ===
Round of 32
Vladimeri Gamkrelidze (GEO)	12
Taran Goring (CAN)	2
Arslan Bagaev (AIN)	11
Miko Elkala (FIN)	0
John Gunderson (USA)	11
Emre Çiftçi (TUR)	11
Aaron Ayzerov (ISR)	15
Nurzhan Issagaliyev (KAZ)	5
Ilya Khamtsou (AIN)	1
Eugeniu Mihalcean (MDA)	3

Round of 16
Abolfazl Rahmani (IRI)	2
Vladimeri Gamkrelidze (GEO)	4
Arslan Bagaev (AIN)	11
John Gunderson (USA)	0
Michal Vereš (SVK)	0
Aaron Ayzerov (ISR)	11
Eugeniu Mihalcean (MDA)	11
Altin Ganci (ALB)	0

Quarterfinals
Vladimeri Gamkrelidze (GEO)	1
Arslan Bagaev (AIN)	7
Aaron Ayzerov (ISR)	4
Eugeniu Mihalcean (MDA)	9

Semifinals
Arslan Bagaev (AIN)	8
Eugeniu Mihalcean (MDA)	1

=== Bottom half ===
Round of 32
Denys Bykov (UKR)	0
Deepak Nehra (IND)	7
Joshua Morodion (GER)	0
Arsenii Dzhioev (AZE)	11
César Ubico (GUA)	5
Razmik Yepremyan (ARM)	9^{R}
Bekzat Rakhimov (KGZ)	7
Kweli Hernández (PUR)	0
Yudai Takahashi (JPN)	8
Rakhim Magamadov (FRA)	6
Steven Rodríguez (VEN)	4^{F}
Fateh Benferdjallah (ALG)	3

Round of 16
Chen Hui (CHN)	2
Deepak Nehra (IND)	6
Arsenii Dzhioev (AZE)	11
César Ubico (GUA)	0
Bekzat Rakhimov (KGZ)	0
Yudai Takahashi (JPN)	8
Steven Rodríguez (VEN)	5
Gabriel Iglesias (ESP)	1

Quarterfinals
Deepak Nehra (IND)	0
Arsenii Dzhioev (AZE)	8
Yudai Takahashi (JPN)	6
Steven Rodríguez (VEN)	1

Semifinals
Arsenii Dzhioev (AZE)	2
Yudai Takahashi (JPN)	1

=== Repechage ===
Repechage round 1
Miko Elkala (FIN)	5
John Gunderson (USA)	7
Joshua Morodion (GER)	10
César Ubico (GUA)	0

Repechage round 2
John Gunderson (USA)	0
Vladimeri Gamkrelidze (GEO)	5
Joshua Morodion (GER)	2
Deepak Nehra (IND)	1

Bronze medals
Vladimeri Gamkrelidze (GEO)	5
Eugeniu Mihalcean (MDA)	6
Joshua Morodion (GER)	2
Yudai Takahashi (JPN)	9

== Final standing ==
Rank	Athlete
1st place, gold medalist(s)	Arslan Bagaev (AIN)
2nd place, silver medalist(s)	Arsenii Dzhioev (AZE)
3rd place, bronze medalist(s)	Eugeniu Mihalcean (MDA)
3rd place, bronze medalist(s)	Yudai Takahashi (JPN)
5	Vladimeri Gamkrelidze (GEO)
5	Joshua Morodion (GER)
7	Steven Rodríguez (VEN)
8	Aaron Ayzerov (ISR)
9	Deepak Nehra (IND)
10	John Gunderson (USA)
11	César Ubico (GUA)
12	Bekzat Rakhimov (KGZ)
13	Emre Çiftçi (TUR)
14	Rakhim Magamadov (FRA)
15	Nurzhan Issagaliyev (KAZ)
16	Miko Elkala (FIN)
17	Abolfazl Rahmani (IRI)
18	Chen Hui (CHN)
19	Taran Goring (CAN)
20	Ilya Khamtsou (AIN)
21	Gabriel Iglesias (ESP)
22	Razmik Yepremyan (ARM)
23	Fateh Benferdjallah (ALG)
24	Denys Bykov (UKR)
25	Kweli Hernández (PUR)
26	Michal Vereš (SVK)
27	Altin Ganci (ALB)
