= Yuto Nishiuchi =

Japanese wrestler (born 2003)

Personal information
- Born: 4 October 2003 (age 23) Kōchi Prefecture, Japan
- Height: 169 cm (5 ft 7 in)

Sport
- Country: Japan
- Sport: Wrestling
- Weight class: 61 kg (134 lb)
- Event: Freestyle
- Club: Kochi Minami High School
Medal record
Men's freestyle wrestling
Representing Japan
Grand Prix
Silver medal – second place	2023 Zagreb	57 kg
Japan Nationals
Bronze medal – third place	2024 Tokyo	61 kg
Silver medal – second place	2023 Tokyo	61 kg
Bronze medal – third place	2022 Tokyo	57 kg
U20 World Championships
Gold medal – first place	2023 Jordan	57 kg
Gold medal – first place	2022 Sofia	61 kg
U17 World Championships
Bronze medal – third place	2019 Sofia	48 kg

Yuto Nishiuchi (born 4 October 2003) is a Japanese freestyle wrestler who competes at 61 kilograms. He is a two-time U20 World champion and two-time Japan National medalist.

== Career ==
Nishiuchi attended Kochi Minami High School in Kōchi Prefecture, where he was a standout in wrestling. In age-group level tournaments, Nishiuchi became a U20 World champion in 2022 and 2023, was a U17 World bronze medalist in 2019 and was also a multiple-time National champion.

In the senior level, Nishiuchi grabbed silver medals from the Grand Prix Zagreb Open and the Japan National Championships in 2023, and a bronze at the latter tournament in 2022. He currently attends the Nippon Sport Science University.
