= 2025 U23 World Wrestling Championships – Men's Greco-Roman 130 kg =

Wrestling competitions

Men's Greco-Roman 130 kg at the 2025 U23 World Championships
- Venue: SPC Vojvodina
- Dates: 20–21 October
- Competitors: 21 from 19 nations

Medalists
| gold medal | Fardin Hedayati | Iran |
| silver medal | Razmik Kurdyan | Armenia |
| bronze medal | László Darabos | Hungary |
| bronze medal | Aleksandr Melekhov |

The men's Greco-Roman 130 kilograms is a competition featured at the 2025 U23 World Wrestling Championships, and was held in Novi Sad, Serbia on 20 and 21 October 2025.

This Greco-Roman wrestling competition consists of a single-elimination tournament, with a repechage used to determine the winner of two bronze medals. The two finalists face off for gold and silver medals. Each wrestler who loses to one of the two finalists moves into the repechage, culminating in a pair of bronze medal matches featuring the semifinal losers each facing the remaining repechage opponent from their half of the bracket.

== Results ==
Legend

- F — Won by fall

=== Final ===
| Final |
| Fardin Hedayati (IRI) | 8 |
| Razmik Kurdyan (ARM) | 0 |

=== Top half ===
Round of 32
Nurbolot Toktogulov (KGZ) | 4^{F}
Ayumu Iwasawa (JPN) | 0
Damirkhon Rakhmatov (UZB) | 4^{F}
Joginder Rathee (IND) | 1
Mykhailo Vyshnyvetskyi (UKR) | 4^{F}
Cemal Yusuf Bakır (TUR) | 0

Round of 16
Saba Chilashvili (GEO) | 0
Fardin Hedayati (IRI) | 9
Nurbolot Toktogulov (KGZ) | 8
Grigorios Kontovounisios (GRE) | 0
László Darabos (HUN) | 8
Damirkhon Rakhmatov (UZB) | 0
Mykhailo Vyshnyvetskyi (UKR) | 1
Aden Attao (USA) | 8

Quarterfinals
Fardin Hedayati (IRI) | 9
Nurbolot Toktogulov (KGZ) | 0
László Darabos (HUN) | 8
Aden Attao (USA) | 0

Semifinals
Fardin Hedayati (IRI) | 4
László Darabos (HUN) | 0

=== Bottom half ===
Round of 32
Luis Talavera (VEN) | 1
Artur Sarkisjan (CZE) | 5
Aleksandr Melekhov (UWW) | 10
David Molnar (SRB) | 1

Round of 16
Ilya Shumchyk (UWW) | 3
Razmik Kurdyan (ARM) | 4
Artur Sarkisjan (CZE) | 2
Robin Uspenski (EST) | 1
Jokhar Uzarov (KAZ) | 1
Aleksandr Melekhov (UWW) | 5^{F}
Aykhan Mardanov (AZE) | 5^{F}
Chen Shuangyu (CHN) | 0

Quarterfinals
Razmik Kurdyan (ARM) | 3
Artur Sarkisjan (CZE) | 2
Aleksandr Melekhov (UWW) | 9
Aykhan Mardanov (AZE) | 0

Semifinals
Razmik Kurdyan (ARM) | 5
Aleksandr Melekhov (UWW) | 1

=== Repechage ===
Repechage round 2
Saba Chilashvili (GEO) | 5
Nurbolot Toktogulov (KGZ) | 1
Ilya Shumchyk (UWW) | 1
Artur Sarkisjan (CZE) | 1

Bronze medals
Saba Chilashvili (GEO) | 0
László Darabos (HUN) | 4^{F}
Artur Sarkisjan (CZE) | 1
Aleksandr Melekhov (UWW) | 9

== Final standing ==
| Rank | Athlete |
|---|---|
| 1st place, gold medalist(s) | Fardin Hedayati (IRI) |
| 2nd place, silver medalist(s) | Razmik Kurdyan (ARM) |
| 3rd place, bronze medalist(s) | László Darabos (HUN) |
| 3rd place, bronze medalist(s) | Aleksandr Melekhov (UWW) |
| 5 | Saba Chilashvili (GEO) |
| 5 | Artur Sarkisjan (CZE) |
| 7 | Nurbolot Toktogulov (KGZ) |
| 8 | Mykhailo Vyshnyvetskyi (UKR) |
| 9 | Aykhan Mardanov (AZE) |
| 10 | Damirkhon Rakhmatov (UZB) |
| 11 | Aden Attao (USA) |
| 12 | Ilya Shumchyk (UWW) |
| 13 | Robin Uspenski (EST) |
| 14 | Luis Talavera (VEN) |
| 15 | David Molnar (SRB) |
| 16 | Joginder Rathee (IND) |
| 17 | Jokhar Uzarov (KAZ) |
| 18 | Ayumu Iwasawa (JPN) |
| 19 | Cemal Yusuf Bakır (TUR) |
| 20 | Chen Shuangyu (CHN) |
| 21 | Grigorios Kontovounisios (GRE) |
