= Jiang Wenhao (wrestler) =

Chinese Greco-Roman wrestler

Personal information
- Native name: 江文豪
- Nationality: China
- Born: 2003 (age 22–23) Changsha, Hunan, China
- Weight: 130 kg (290 lb; 20 st)

Sport
- Country: China
- Sport: Amateur wrestling
- Weight class: 130 kg
- Event: Greco-Roman
Medal record
Men's Greco-Roman wrestling
Representing China
World Championships
Bronze medal – third place	2026 Astana	130 kg
Asian Championships
Bronze medal – third place	2026 Bishkek	130 kg
Grand Prix
Bronze medal – third place	2026 Budapest	130 kg
World U23 Championships
Gold medal – first place	2026 Las Vegas	130 kg
Asian U23 Championships
Gold medal – first place	2023 Bishkek	130 kg
Gold medal – first place	2024 Amman	130 kg
Gold medal – first place	2025 Vung Tau	130 kg
World Junior Championships
Silver medal – second place	2023 Amman	130 kg
Asian Junior Championships
Silver medal – second place	2023 Amman	130 kg

Jiang Wenhao (born 2003) is a Chinese Greco-Roman wrestler.

== Background ==
Jiang was born in 2003 and is a native of Changsha in Hunan province.

In 2016, Jiang was selected to join He Long sports school for wrestling. After two years at the school, Jiang was selected for the provincial team.

Jiang's idols are Aleksandr Karelin and Mijaín López.

== Career ==
In 2019, Jiang was champion in the 2019 China National Youth Games. He would repeat his win in the 2023 edition.

In 2021, Jiang came fifth place in the 2021 National Games of China. After this Jiang became part of the national team.

In 2023, Jiang obtained silver medals at both the Asian Junior Championship as well as the World Junior Wrestling Championship where he lost to Fardin Hedayati in the finals both times.

Jiang was three-time champion of the Asian U23 Championship from 2023 to 2025.

In October 2026, Jiang became champion at the 2026 U23 World Wrestling Championships after defeating Ali Iliasov in the finals. A few days later, Jiang won a bronze medal at the 2026 World Wrestling Championships by defeating Elias Kuosmanen.
