= Danila Sotnikov =

Italian Greco-Roman wrestler

Danila Sotnikov Данила Сотников
Personal information
- Born: 2 November 1993 (age 33) North Ossetia–Alania, Russia
- Height: 1.95 m (6 ft 5 in)
- Weight: 130 kg (290 lb; 20 st)

Sport
- Country: Russia (2016–2020); Italy (2022–present)
- Sport: Amateur wrestling
- Weight class: 130 kg
- Event: Greco-Roman
Medal record
Men's Greco-Roman wrestling
Representing Italy
European Championships
Silver medal – second place	2022 Budapest	130 kg
Bronze medal – third place	2024 Bucharest	130 kg

Danila Sotnikov (Данила Сотников; born 2 November 1993) is a Russian-Italian Greco-Roman wrestler who currently competes at 130 kilograms.

== Wrestling career ==
He won the silver medal at the 2022 European Wrestling Championships in Budapest, Hungary, losing 4–0 to Turkey's Rıza Kayaalp in the final match of the 130 kg in the Greco-Roman style.

He won one of the bronze medals in the 130 kg event at the 2024 European Wrestling Championships held in Bucharest, Romania.
