= Fardin Hedayati =

Iranian Greco-Roman wrestler

Personal information
- Full name: Fardin Hedayati
- Nicknames: Bulldozer Without Brakes; The Monster on Mat
- Nationality: Iran
- Born: 12 May 2004 (age 22) Amol, Mazandaran, Iran
- Height: 185 cm (6 ft 1 in)
- Weight: 130 kg (287 lb)

Sport
- Country: Iran
- Sport: Amateur wrestling
- Weight class: 130 kg
- Event: Greco-Roman
- Club: Fooladin Zob Amol
- Turned pro: 2022
- Now coaching: Ghasem Rezaei; Hamid Bavafa; Hassan Hosseinzadeh
Medal record
Men's Greco-Roman wrestling
Representing Iran
World Championships
Gold medal – first place	2026 Astana	130 kg
Asian Championships
Gold medal – first place	2025 Amman	130 kg
Islamic Solidarity Games
Gold medal – first place	2025 Riyadh	130 kg
Grand Prix
Gold medal – first place	2024 Zagreb	130 kg
Gold medal – first place	2024 Budapest	130 kg
U23 World Championships
Gold medal – first place	2024 Tirana	130 kg
Gold medal – first place	2025 Novi Sad	130 kg
World Junior Championships
Gold medal – first place	2023 Amman	130 kg
Silver medal – second place	2022 Sofia	130 kg
Asian Junior Championship
Gold medal – first place	2022 Manama	130 kg
Gold medal – first place	2023 Amman	130 kg
Vehbi Emre & Hamit Kaplan Tournament
Bronze medal – third place	2024 Antalya	130 kg

Fardin Hedayati (Persian: فردین هدایتی, born 12 May 2004) is an Iranian Greco-Roman wrestler competing in the 130 kg division.

== Career ==
He won the gold medal in the 130 kg event at the 2023 World Junior Wrestling Championships held in Amman, Jordan and won gold medal in the 2024 U23 World Wrestling Championships in Tirana, Albania.

He won the final of the 2025 Asian Wrestling Championships in Amman, Jordan, in the first round against Kyrgyzstan's Erlan Manatbekov 8–0, in the quarterfinals against China's Jiang Wenhao 8-0 and in the semifinals against Japan's Yuta Nara 9–0 with technical superiority. He became the Asian champion by defeating Kazakhstan's Alimkhan Syzdykov 7–0 in the final match.

Hedayati his first world championship held in Astana, Kazakhstan in 2026 World Wrestling Championships, won the gold medal in the 130 kg weight class. He in the final faced Dárius Vitek from Hungary and secured 8–0 victory. Throughout the four matches he contested in this tournament, Hedayati did not concede a single point to his opponents.

== Achievements ==
=== World ===
- Astana – (gold) 2026
- Novi Sad Serbia – (gold) 2025
- Tirana Albania – (gold) 2024
- Amman Jordan – (gold) 2023
- Sofia Bulgaria – (silver) 2022

=== Asia ===
- Amman Jordan – (gold) 2025
- Amman Jordan – (gold) 2023
- Manama Bahrain – (gold) 2022

=== International Tournament ===
- Grand Prix Zagreb Open – (gold) 2024
- Polyák Imre & Varga János Memorial, Budapest Hungary – (gold) 2024
- Victory Cup, Antalya Turkey – (gold) 2023
- Benur Pashayan Championship, Yerevan Armenia – (gold) 2023
