= Valentin Khlystov =

Personal information
- Full name: Valentin Stepanovich Khlystov
- Date of birth: 28 February 1927
- Place of birth: Baku, Azerbaijan SSR, Soviet Union
- Date of death: 8 March 2007 (aged 80)
- Place of death: Moscow, Russia
- Position: Defender

Senior career*
Years	Team	Apps	(Gls)
1946–1955	Neftyanik	171	(3)

Managerial career
- 1959–1960: Tekstilshchik Kirovabad
- 1961: Spartak Baku
- 1962: Neft Daşları
- 1973–1975: Neftchi
- 1977–1978: Araz-Nakhchivan
- 1979: Avtomobilist Baku
- 1980: Avtomobilist Mingachevir
- * Club domestic league appearances and goals

Valentin Stepanovich Khlystov (Валентин Степанович Хлыстов; 28 February 1927 – 8 March 2007) was a Soviet football player and manager who played as a defender. He was awarded the honorary title of Honoured Worker of Physical Culture and Sport of the Republic of Azerbaijan in 1991.

== Early life ==
Valentin Khlystov was born on 28 February 1927 in Baku, Azerbaijan SSR, to a Russian family. His parents were born in the city of Kars, then part of the Russian Empire and now located in Turkey. In 1903, the Khlystov family moved to Baku because of the unstable political situation.

Khlystov began playing football in 1943, during World War II. He was a product of the Reserve Labour Forces sports organization. In 1946, he joined Neftyanik.

Playing as a left-sided defender, Khlystov remained with Neftyanik until 1955. He was forced to end his playing career after suffering an injury in a match against Torpedo Moscow. According to the club's records, he made 171 appearances and scored three goals for Neftyanik between 1946 and 1955.

== Managerial career ==
After ending his playing career, Khlystov moved to Moscow and studied at the Higher School of Coaches. He returned to Baku and worked as a coach at Neftyanik in 1958. He subsequently managed several football clubs in Azerbaijan.

Khlystov worked for many years at the Neftchi Olympic Reserve School for Children and Youth, where he also served as director.

His managerial career included the following clubs:

- Tekstilshchik Kirovabad (1959–1960)
- Spartak Baku (1961)
- Neft Daşları (1962)
- Neftchi (1973–1975)
- Araz-Nakhchivan (1977–1978)
- Avtomobilist Baku (1979)
- Avtomobilist Mingachevir (1980)

== Death ==
Valentin Khlystov died in Moscow on 8 March 2007.

== Honours ==
- Honoured Worker of Physical Culture and Sport of the Republic of Azerbaijan (1991)
