= 2023 U20 World Wrestling Championships =

2023 World Junior Wrestling Championships
- Host city: Amman, Jordan
- Dates: 14–20 August 2023
- Stadium: Amman International Stadium

Champions
- Freestyle: Iran
- Greco-Roman: Iran
- Women: India

The 2023 World Junior Wrestling Championships (U20) was the 45th edition of the World Junior Wrestling Championships and was held in Amman, Jordan between 14 and 20 August 2023. The event was originally scheduled to be held in Warsaw, Poland from August 14-20. Due to Poland's refusal to issue visas to Russian and Belarusian wrestlers, United World Wrestling moved the tournament from Poland to Jordan.

== Competition schedule ==
All times are (UTC+3)

Date	Time	Event
14 August	10.00-14.30	Qualification rounds FS – 57-65-70-79-97 kg
14 August	18:30-19.30	Semi Final FS – 57-65-70-79-97 kg
15 August	10.00-14.30	Qualification rounds FS – 61-74-86-92-125 kg; Repechage FS – 57-65-70-79-97 kg
15 August	16.45-18.00	Semi Final FS – 61-74-86-92-125 kg
15 August	18.30-20.30	FS – 57-65-70-79-97 kg
16 August	10.00-14.30	Qualification rounds WW – 50-55-59-68-76 kg; Repechage FS – 61-74-86-92-125 kg
16 August	16.45-18.00	Semi Final WW – 50-55-59-68-76 kg
16 August	18.30-20.30	Finals FS – 61-74-86-92-125 kg
17 August	10.00-14.30	Qualification rounds WW – 53-57-62-65-72 kg; Repechage WW – 50-55-59-68-76 kg
17 August	17.00-17.45	Semi Final WW – 53-57-62-65-72 kg
17 August	18.30-20.00	Finals WW – 50-55-59-68-76 kg
18 August	10.00-14.30	Qualification rounds GR – 55-63-77-87-130 kg; Repechage WW – 53-57-62-65-72 kg
18 August	17.00-17.45	Semi-finals: GR – 55-63-77-87-130 kg
18 August	18.30-20.00	Finals WW – 53-57-62-65-72 kg
19 August	10.00-14.30	Qualification rounds GR – 60-67-72-82-97 kg; Repechage GR – 55-63-77-87-130 kg
19 August	17.00-17.45	Semi Final GR – 60-67-72-82-97 kg
19 August	18.00-21.00	Finals GR – 55-63-77-87-130 kg
20 August	16.30-18.00	Repechage GR – 60-67-72-82-97 kg
20 August	18.30-20.30	Finals GR – 60-67-72-82-97 kg

== Medal table ==
* Host nation (Jordan)

Rank	Nation	Gold	Silver	Bronze	Total
1	Iran	7	4	2	13
–	Individual Neutral Athletes ^{a}	4	4	8	16
2	India	4	3	7	14
3	United States	3	3	7	13
4	Japan	2	2	5	9
5	Ukraine	1	2	1	4
6	Turkey	1	1	5	7
7	Georgia	1	1	4	6
8	Armenia	1	1	2	4
8	Hungary	1	1	2	4
10	China	1	1	1	3
10	Kazakhstan	1	1	1	3
12	Egypt	1	0	1	2
13	France	1	0	0	1
13	Italy	1	0	0	1
15	Azerbaijan	0	1	3	4
15	Kyrgyzstan	0	1	3	4
17	Moldova	0	1	2	3
18	Romania	0	1	1	2
19	Germany	0	1	0	1
19	Venezuela	0	1	0	1
21	Uzbekistan	0	0	2	2
22	Greece	0	0	1	1
22	Mexico	0	0	1	1
22	Poland	0	0	1	1
Totals (24 entries)		30	30	60	120

== Russian and Belarusian participation ==
a In accordance with sanctions imposed following by the 2022 Russian invasion of Ukraine, wrestlers from Russia and Belarus were not permitted to use the name, flag, or anthem of Russia or Belarus. They instead participated as "Individual Neutral Athletes (AIN)", their medals were not included in the official medal table.

== Team ranking ==
Rank	Men's freestyle		Men's Greco-Roman		Women's freestyle	
Rank	Team	Points	Team	Points	Team	Points
1	Iran	165	Iran	162	India	140
2	United States	152	Georgia	89	Japan	129
3	India	102	Armenia	88	United States	118
4	Japan	63	Turkey	81	Ukraine	90
5	Turkey	61	Kyrgyzstan	70	Hungary	65
6	Kazakhstan	56	Kazakhstan	60	China	52
7	Georgia	54	India	55	Turkey	48
8	Armenia	53	Egypt	46	Romania	41
9	Azerbaijan	45	Azerbaijan	43	Poland	32
10	Ukraine	44	Moldova	39	Italy	31

== Medal overview ==
=== Men's freestyle ===
Event	Gold	Silver	Bronze
57 kg	Yuto Nishiuchi; Japan	Luke Lilledahl; United States	Nodirbek Jumanazarov; Uzbekistan
57 kg	Yuto Nishiuchi; Japan	Luke Lilledahl; United States	Edik Harutyunyan; Armenia
61 kg	Mohit Kumar; India	Eldar Akhmadudinov; Authorised Neutral Athletes	Ali Khorramdel; Iran
61 kg	Mohit Kumar; India	Eldar Akhmadudinov; Authorised Neutral Athletes	Nic Bouzakis; United States
65 kg	Mohammad Reza Shakeri; Iran	Jesse Mendez; United States	Abdullah Toprak; Turkey
65 kg	Mohammad Reza Shakeri; Iran	Jesse Mendez; United States	Dalgat Abdulkadyrov; Authorised Neutral Athletes
70 kg	Meyer Shapiro; United States	Ali Rezaei; Iran	Magomed Baituakev; Authorised Neutral Athletes
70 kg	Meyer Shapiro; United States	Ali Rezaei; Iran	Metehan Yaprak; Turkey
74 kg	Mitchell Mesenbrink; United States	Hossein Mohammad Aghaei; Iran	Giorgi Gogritchiani; Georgia
74 kg	Mitchell Mesenbrink; United States	Hossein Mohammad Aghaei; Iran	Jaideep Narwal; India
79 kg	Ibragim Kadiev; Authorised Neutral Athletes	Sagar Jaglan; India	Ali Tcokaev; Azerbaijan
79 kg	Ibragim Kadiev; Authorised Neutral Athletes	Sagar Jaglan; India	Matthew Singleton; United States
86 kg	Rakhim Magamadov; France	Fumiya Igarashi; Japan	Bennett Berge; United States
86 kg	Rakhim Magamadov; France	Fumiya Igarashi; Japan	Eugeniu Mihalcean; Moldova
92 kg	Mohammad Mobin Azimi; Iran	Rizabek Aitmukhan; Kazakhstan	Giorgi Romelashvili; Georgia
92 kg	Mohammad Mobin Azimi; Iran	Rizabek Aitmukhan; Kazakhstan	Mustafagadzhi Malachdibirov; Authorised Neutral Athletes
97 kg	Abolfazl Babaloo; Iran	Ivan Prymachenko; Ukraine	Camden McDanel; United States
97 kg	Abolfazl Babaloo; Iran	Ivan Prymachenko; Ukraine	Deepak Chahal; India
125 kg	Amir Reza Masoumi; Iran	Said Akhmatov; Authorised Neutral Athletes	Hakan Büyükçıngıl; Turkey
125 kg	Amir Reza Masoumi; Iran	Said Akhmatov; Authorised Neutral Athletes	Rajat Ruhal; India

=== Men's Greco-Roman ===
Event	Gold	Silver	Bronze
55 kg	Iskhar Kurbayev; Kazakhstan	Farid Sadikhli; Azerbaijan	Alisher Ganiev; Uzbekistan
55 kg	Iskhar Kurbayev; Kazakhstan	Farid Sadikhli; Azerbaijan	Nuristan Suiorkulov; Kyrgyzstan
60 kg	Suren Aghajanyan; Armenia	Sumit Dalal; India	Ilkin Gurbanov; Azerbaijan
60 kg	Suren Aghajanyan; Armenia	Sumit Dalal; India	Amir Reza Dehbozorgi; Iran
63 kg	Ahmad Reza Mohsennejad; Iran	Zhantoro Mirzaliev; Kyrgyzstan	Komei Sawada; Japan
63 kg	Ahmad Reza Mohsennejad; Iran	Zhantoro Mirzaliev; Kyrgyzstan	Dinislam Sagitzhan; Kazakhstan
67 kg	Moustafa Alameldin; Egypt	Gaspar Terteryan; Armenia	Arslanbek Salimov; Poland
67 kg	Moustafa Alameldin; Egypt	Gaspar Terteryan; Armenia	Azat Sarıyar; Turkey
72 kg	Imran Aliev; Authorised Neutral Athletes	Levente Lévai; Hungary	Muhammed Ali Göçmen; Turkey
72 kg	Imran Aliev; Authorised Neutral Athletes	Levente Lévai; Hungary	Anri Putkaradze; Georgia
77 kg	Alireza Abdevali; Iran	Alexandru Solovei; Moldova	Abdulmasih Abdulmasih; Authorised Neutral Athletes
77 kg	Alireza Abdevali; Iran	Alexandru Solovei; Moldova	Deepak Punia; India
82 kg	Alperen Berber; Turkey	Yasin Yazdi; Iran	Imam Aliev; Authorised Neutral Athletes
82 kg	Alperen Berber; Turkey	Yasin Yazdi; Iran	Data Chkhaidze; Georgia
87 kg	Achiko Bolkvadze; Georgia	Abolfazl Choubani; Iran	Vigen Nazaryan; Armenia
87 kg	Achiko Bolkvadze; Georgia	Abolfazl Choubani; Iran	Asan Zhanyshov; Kyrgyzstan
97 kg	Abubakar Khaslakhanau; Authorised Neutral Athletes	Gor Ayvazyan; Georgia	Rostislav Covali; Moldova
97 kg	Abubakar Khaslakhanau; Authorised Neutral Athletes	Gor Ayvazyan; Georgia	Magomed Mukhtarov; Authorised Neutral Athletes
130 kg	Fardin Hedayati; Iran	Jiang Wenhao; China	Fekry Eisa; Egypt
130 kg	Fardin Hedayati; Iran	Jiang Wenhao; China	Achilleas Chrysidis; Greece

=== Women's freestyle ===
Event	Gold	Silver	Bronze
50 kg	Li Yanrong; China	Audrey Jimenez; United States	Miruko Sakane; Japan
50 kg	Li Yanrong; China	Audrey Jimenez; United States	Viktoriia Slobodeniuk; Ukraine
53 kg	Antim Panghal; India	Mariia Yefremova; Ukraine	Gultakin Shirinova; Azerbaijan
53 kg	Antim Panghal; India	Mariia Yefremova; Ukraine	Liang Xuejing; China
55 kg	Aryna Martynava; Authorised Neutral Athletes	Georgiana Lircă; Romania	Amani Jones; United States
55 kg	Aryna Martynava; Authorised Neutral Athletes	Georgiana Lircă; Romania	Moe Kiyooka; Japan
57 kg	Alina Filipovych; Ukraine	Ichika Arai; Japan	Gerda Terék; Hungary
57 kg	Alina Filipovych; Ukraine	Ichika Arai; Japan	Reena Sangwan; India
59 kg	Aurora Russo; Italy	Alesia Hetmanava; Authorised Neutral Athletes	Kalmira Bilimbek Kyzy; Kyrgyzstan
59 kg	Aurora Russo; Italy	Alesia Hetmanava; Authorised Neutral Athletes	Alexis Janiak; United States
62 kg	Savita Dalal; India	Astrid Montero; Venezuela	Suzu Sasaki; Japan
62 kg	Savita Dalal; India	Astrid Montero; Venezuela	Melanie Jiménez; Mexico
65 kg	Enikő Elekes; Hungary	Antim Kundu; India	Maria-Magdalena Panțîru; Romania
65 kg	Enikő Elekes; Hungary	Antim Kundu; India	Kseniya Tsiarenia; Authorised Neutral Athletes
68 kg	Ray Hoshino; Japan	Elizaveta Petliakova; Authorised Neutral Athletes	Arju; India
68 kg	Ray Hoshino; Japan	Elizaveta Petliakova; Authorised Neutral Athletes	Alina Shauchuk; Authorised Neutral Athletes
72 kg	Amit Elor; United States	Bükrenaz Sert; Turkey	Harshita Mor; India
72 kg	Amit Elor; United States	Bükrenaz Sert; Turkey	Yuka Fujikura; Japan
76 kg	Priya Malik; India	Laura Kühn; Germany	Kennedy Blades; United States
76 kg	Priya Malik; India	Laura Kühn; Germany	Veronika Nyikos; Hungary

== Participating nations ==
647 wrestlers from 56 nations:

1. Individual Neutral Athletes (58)
2. Algeria (2)
3. Argentina (1)
4. Armenia (19)
5. Australia (1)
6. Austria (6)
7. Azerbaijan (22)
8. Brazil (1)
9. Belgium (1)
10. Bulgaria (14)
11. Canada (10)
12. China (18)
13. Cape Verde (1)
14. Croatia (7)
15. Czech Republic (4)
16. Ecuador (1)
17. Egypt (16)
18. Spain (5)
19. Estonia (6)
20. Finland (5)
21. France (8)
22. Georgia (20)
23. Germany (18)
24. Greece (6)
25. Hungary (19)
26. India (30)
27. Iran (20)
28. Italy (4)
29. Jordan (9) (Host)
30. Japan (30)
31. Kazakhstan (30)
32. Kyrgyzstan (23)
33. South Korea (5)
34. Saudi Arabia (3)
35. Latvia (3)
36. Lithuania (4)
37. Moldova (19)
38. Mexico (2)
39. North Macedonia (3)
40. Netherlands (1)
41. Norway (1)
42. Poland (25)
43. Puerto Rico (3)
44. Romania (12)
45. South Africa (1)
46. Serbia (9)
47. Switzerland (7)
48. Slovakia (3)
49. Tajikistan (1)
50. Turkmenistan (9)
51. Chinese Taipei (6)
52. Tunisia (1)
53. Turkey (30)
54. Ukraine (30)
55. United States (30)
56. Uzbekistan (19)
57. Venezuela (5)
