= Arsenii Dzhioev =

Azerbaijani freestyle wrestler

Sport
- Country: Azerbaijan
- Sport: Amateur wrestling
- Event: Freestyle
Medal record
Men's freestyle wrestling
Representing Azerbaijan
World Championships
Bronze medal – third place	2025 Zagreb	86 kg
European Championships
Silver medal – second place	2026 Tirana	86 kg
Islamic Solidarity Games
Gold medal – first place	2025 Riyadh	86 kg
World U23 Championships
Silver medal – second place	2024 Tirana	86 kg
European U23 Championships
Bronze medal – third place	2024 Baku	86 kg

Arsenii Dzhioev (Iron Ossetic: Джиоты Арсени; Russian: Арсений Батирович Джиоев) is an Azerbaijani freestyle wrestler.

== Career ==
As of November 2026, holds first place in the ranking of Azerbaijani athletes according to the Ministry of Youth and Sports with a score of 470 points.

On April 25, 2026, at the European Wrestling Championship in Tirana, he defeated Latvian athlete Ivars Samusonoks with a score of 12:2 and advanced to the final, where he lost to Ibragim Kadiev (UWW) and won the silver medal.

== Achievements ==
Year	Tournament	Location	Result	Event
2026	European Championships	Tirana, Albania	2rd	Freestyle 86 kg
