= Sagar Jaglan =

Indian freestyle wrestler (born 2004)

Personal information
- National team: India
- Born: 2004 (age 21–22) Naultha, Panipat district, Haryana, India

Sport
- Country: India
- Sport: Freestyle Wrestling
- Weight class: 74 KG

Sagar Jaglan (born 2004) is an Indian freestyle wrestler, who competes in the men's 74 kg weight category. He made his debut for India at the 2026 Asian Games and lost the bronze medal play-off to finish fifth.

== Early life ==
Jaglan is from Naultha village, Panipat district, Haryana. He did his schooling at Pratap School in Kharkhoda where he took to wrestling.

== Career ==
In the 2026 Asian Games, he beat the reigning Olympic champion, Uzbekistan's Razambek Zhamalov 7–3, in the repechage bout . But he lost the bronze medal match to Kazakhstan's Nurkozha Kaipanov. In his first bout in the round of 16, he beat Mongolia's Tumur-Ochir Tulga 8–1.

In August 2023, he won a silver medal in the men's freestyle 79 kg event at the Under-20 World Championships in Amman, Jordan. He lost 6–17 to Ibragim Kadiev in the final.

In 2022, he won a bronze medal at the U20 World Championship held in Bulgaria. In 2021, he won a gold in the 80 kg category at the Cadet World Championships in Hungary. In November 2019, he won a gold medal in the freestyle 68 kg category at the Under-15 Asian Wrestling Championships. He recovered from 1–6 down against Bexultanov Yerkhan of Kazakhstan and won 7–6 in the last 20 seconds.

In May 2023, he won a gold medal representing Kurukshetra University in the 79 kg weight category at the Khelo India University Games 2022 at Uttar Pradesh.
