= Ahmad Alaskarov =

Azerbaijani footballer and manager (1935-2015)

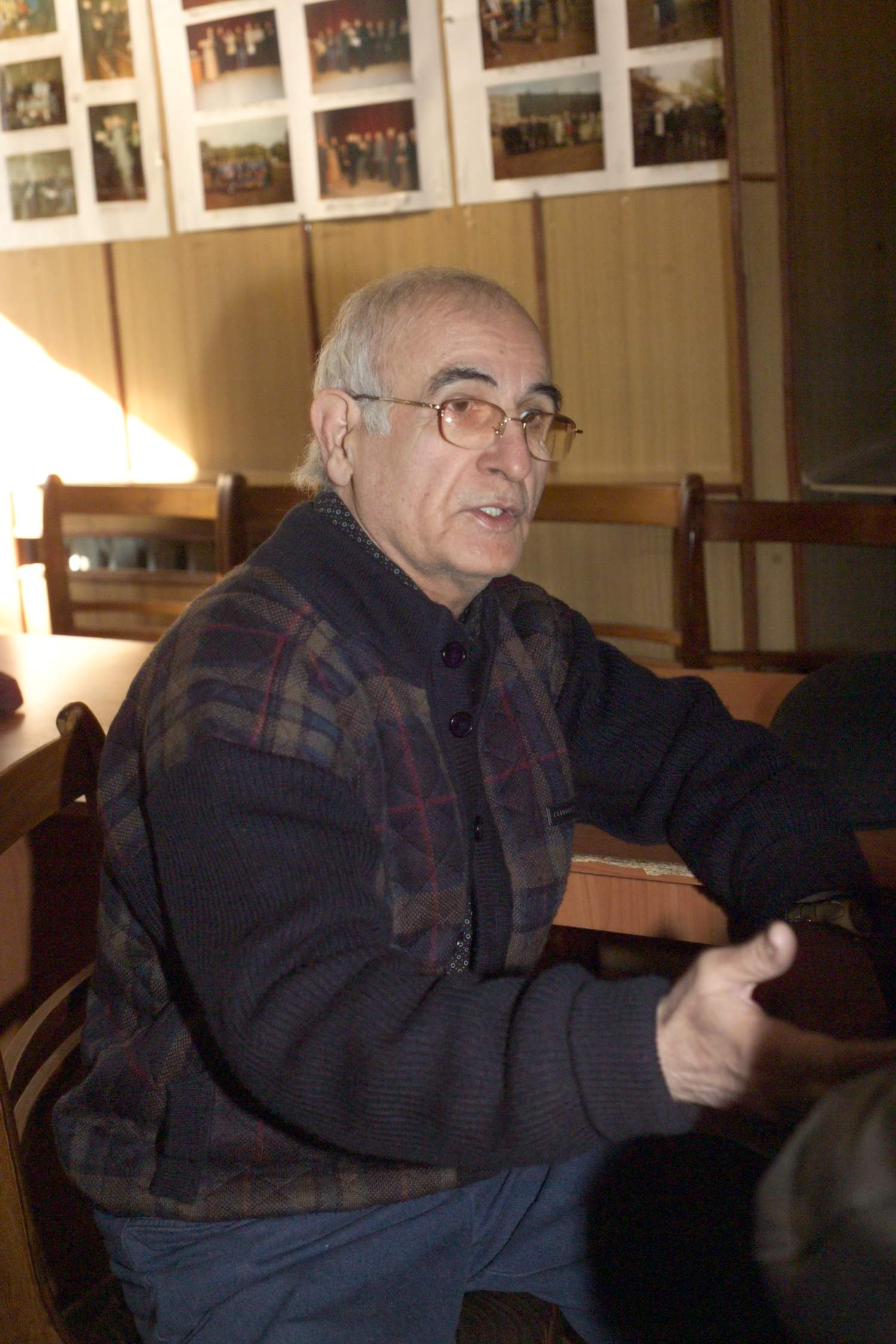

Personal information
- Full name: Ahmad Latif oglu Alasgarov
- Date of birth: 5 October 1935
- Place of birth: Baku, Azerbaijan SSR, USSR
- Date of death: 19 May 2015 (aged 79)
- Place of death: Odesa, Ukraine
- Position: Defender

Senior career*
Years	Team	Apps	(Gls)
1955–1965	Neftyanik Baku	115	(6)

Managerial career
- 1966–1970: Neftchi Baku
- 1972: SKA-Pamir Dushanbe
- 1973–1977: Chornomorets Odesa
- 1979: Araz
- 1979–1982: Neftchi Baku
- 1988–1989: FC Nistru Chişinău
- 1991–1992: Neftchi Baku
- 1992–1993: Azerbaijan
- 1994: Anzhi Makhachkala
- 1997–1998: FC Sheriff
- 1998–1999: Azerbaijan
- 1999–2000: Neftchi Baku
- 2005–2006: FC Baku
- * Club domestic league appearances and goals as of 19 May 2015 ‡ National team caps and goals as of 19 May 2015

Ahmad Latifovich Alaskarov (Azerbaijani: Əhməd Lətif oğlu Ələsgərov, Russian: Ахмед Лятифович Алескеров; 5 October 1935 – 19 May 2015) was an Azerbaijani footballer and manager.

== Biography ==
After graduating from Azerbaijan State Physical Culture and Sports Academy, Alaskarov played for Neftchi Baku as a defender from 1955 to 1965 and managed the side in the 1960s, 1980s, and 2000s.

Alaskarov has also managed the Azerbaijani national football team. He was classified as a Master of Sport of the USSR in 1963. Alaskarov died in 2015 in Odesa, Ukraine.
