= Ruslan Abdullayev =

Azerbaijani football manager (1944–2002)

Ruslan Abullayev
Personal information
- Full name: Ruslan Abdulla oğlu Abdullayev
- Date of birth: 7 March 1944 (age 82)
- Place of birth: Azerbaijan
- Date of death: 31 January 2002 (aged 57)
- Place of death: Azerbaijan
- Position: Forward

Managerial career
- Years: Team
- 1982: Araz-Naxçıvan
- 1984: Neftçi
- 1985–1986: Neftçi
- 1990–1991: Turan Tovuz
- 1994–1995: PFK Piešťany
- 1997–1998: Neftçi
- 1998: Kapaz
- 1999–2000: Erzurumspor

Ruslan Abdulla oğlu Abdullayev (Russian: Руслан Абдуллаев; 7 March 1944 – 31 January 2002) was an Azerbaijani football manager and player.

== Early life ==
Abdullayev was born in 1944 in Azerbaijan. He attended the Higher School of Coaches in Russia.

== Career ==
In 1998, Abullayev was appointed manager of Azerbaijani side Kapaz. He helped the club win the 1998–99 Azerbaijan Top League.

== Style of play ==
Abdullayev mainly operated as a forward. He was described as "distinguished by his game discipline, focus on the goal, technique and dedication".

== Personal life ==
Abdullayev was married. He was the father of Azerbaijani football manager Elkhan Abdullayev.
