= Novokayakent =

Coordinates: 42.3873°N 47.9867°E

Novokayakent (Russian: Новокаякент; Kumyk: Янгъы Къаягент, Yañı Qayagent) is a village in Dagestan Republic. It is the administrative centre of Kayakentsky District.

== Geography ==
The village is located at the mouth of the Gamriozen River, where it flows into the Caspian Sea, 75 km southeast of Makhachkala and 48 km northwest of the city of Derbent.

== History ==
The Qayagent railway station of the North Caucasus Railway operates in the village.

Since 1965, it has been the administrative center of the re-established Kayakentsky District.

The Kayakent balneological and mud-bath resort, located south of the village, has been in operation since 1945. In 1959, the health resort began operating year-round. In 2000, the treatment center and residential facilities underwent a comprehensive renovation. The sanatorium’s medical facilities were also modernized.

== Population ==
=== Ethnic composition ===
According to the 2021 Russian census:

| Nationality | Number of people | Share |
|---|---|---|
| Kumyks | 4,258 | 71.53 % |
| Dargins | 990 | 16.63% |
| those who did not specify | 441 | 7.40 % |
| other | 263 | 4.41 % |
| total | 5,952 | 100 % |
