= Kayakentsky District =

Kayakentsky District Каякентский район (Russian)
- District

Other transcription(s)
  - Kumyk: Къаягентли якъ
  - Dargwa: Къаякентла район
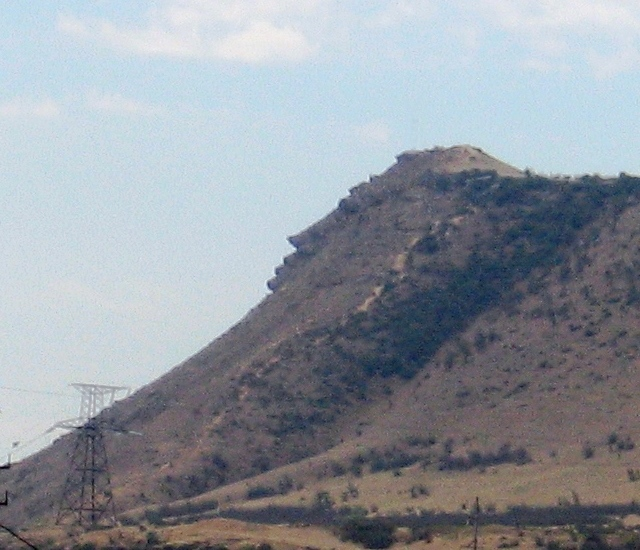
- Pushkin Mountain, Kayakentsky District

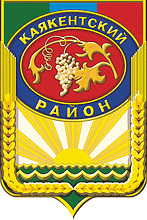
- Coat of arms
- Location of Kayakentsky District in the Republic of Dagestan
- Coordinates: 42°23′N 47°59′E
- Country: Russia
- Federal subject: Republic of Dagestan
- Established: 1935
- Administrative center: Novokayakent

Area
  - Total: 640 km^{2} (250 sq mi)

Population (2010 Census)
  - Total: 54,089
  - Density: 85/km^{2} (220/sq mi)
  - Urban: 0%
  - Rural: 100%

Administrative structure
  - Administrative divisions: 5 Selsoviets
  - Inhabited localities: 19 rural localities

Municipal structure
  - Municipally incorporated as: Kayakentsky Municipal District
  - Municipal divisions: 0 urban settlements, 14 rural settlements
- Time zone: UTC+3 (MSK)
- OKTMO ID: 82624000
- Website: http://kmr05.ru/

Population of Kayakentsky District
- 2010 Census: 54,089
- 2002 Census: 52,739
- 1989 Census: 34,019
- 1979 Census: 28,851

Kayakentsky District (Russian: Каяке́нтский райо́н, Kumyk: Къаягентли якъ, Qayagentli yaq) is an administrative and municipal district (raion), one of the forty-one in the Republic of Dagestan, Russia. It is located in the east of the republic. The area of the district is 640 square kilometers (250 sq mi). Its administrative center is the rural locality (a selo) of Novokayakent. As of the 2010 Census, the total population of the district was 54,089, with the population of Novokayakent accounting for 9.5% of that number.

== Administrative and municipal status ==
Within the framework of administrative divisions, Kayakentsky District is one of the forty-one in the Republic of Dagestan. The district is divided into five selsoviets which comprise nineteen rural localities. As a municipal division, the district is incorporated as Kayakentsky Municipal District. Its five selsoviets are incorporated as fourteen rural settlements within the municipal district. The selo of Novokayakent serves as the administrative center of both the administrative and municipal district.
