= 2026 NCAA Division I Men's Wrestling Championships =

American collegiate wrestling tournament

- Season: 2025–26
- Teams: 68
- Format: Double-elimination
- Finals site: Rocket Arena; Cleveland, Ohio
- Champions: Penn State (14th title)
- Runner-up: Oklahoma State
- Winning coach: Cael Sanderson (13th title)
- MOW: Mitchell Mesenbrink (Penn State)
- Attendance: 16,625 (session I); 16,777 (session II); 17,067 (session III); 17,115 (session IV); 17,621 (session V); 17,845 (session VI)
- Television: ESPN; ESPN2; ESPNU; ESPN+

The 2026 NCAA Division I Men's Wrestling Championships was the 95th annual NCAA Division I Men's Wrestling Championship that took place from March 19–21, 2026 in Cleveland at the Rocket Arena.

Penn State won its 14th national team title and its 13th under head coach Cael Sanderson. The championship was also the program's fifth consecutive NCAA team title. The Nittany Lions also broke their 2025 tournament record for most points scored in a single tournament with 181.5 points.

Penn State had the most individual champions, with four wrestlers winning NCAA titles: Luke Lilledahl, Mitchell Mesenbrink, Levi Haines, and Josh Barr. Oklahoma State had three individual champions: Jax Forrest, Sergio Vega, and Landon Robideau. Stanford, Minnesota, and NC State each had one individual champion, with Aden Valencia, Max McEnelly, and Isaac Trumble, respectively, winning titles. Oklahoma State finished in second place, their highest team placement and largest point total at the NCAA tournament since 2016. Nebraska finished in third place with 100.5 points marking their second-highest team point total in team history.

== Qualification ==
=== Pre-allocations ===
The NCAA announced qualifying tournament pre-allocations on February 26, 2026.

Conference	125	133	141	149	157	165	174	184	197	285	Total
ACC	5	3	5	4	4	4	3	4	3	4	39
Big 12	5	8	7	5	5	4	7	8	8	6	63
Big Ten	9	8	7	9	8	9	10	8	10	9	87
EIWA	2	2	3	1	2	4	3	3	2	4	26
Ivy League	2	2	3	3	4	3	2	1	1	2	23
MAC	2	4	2	4	4	2	2	3	2	2	27
Pac-12	2	1	1	2	1	1	1	1	2	1	13
Southern	1	1	1	1	1	1	1	1	1	1	10
Pre-allocations	28	29	29	29	29	28	29	29	29	29	288

=== At-large selections ===
The NCAA announced at-large selections on March 11, 2026.

Conference	125	133	141	149	157	165	174	184	197	285	Total
ACC	0	0	0	0	1	1	1	0	0	1	4
Big 12	2	2	1	1	1	0	1	2	3	2	15
Big Ten	1	2	1	1	0	1	0	1	0	0	7
EIWA	1	0	1	0	1	0	0	1	0	1	5
Ivy League	1	0	1	1	0	0	1	0	0	0	4
MAC	0	1	0	1	1	1	1	0	1	0	6
Pac-12	0	0	0	0	0	1	0	0	0	0	1
Southern	0	0	0	0	0	1	0	0	0	0	1
At-large bids	5	5	4	4	4	5	4	4	4	4	43

== Participating teams ==
A total of 68 teams qualified wrestlers. California Baptist University announced that it would discontinue the wrestling program following the 2025–26 season. Morgan State University had two qualifiers in its return to competition, which last occurred in 1997.

- Air Force (2)
- American (3)
- Appalachian State (3)
- Arizona State (7)
- Army (4)
- Bellarmine (2)
- Binghamton (2)
- Bloomsburg (2)
- Brown (3)
- Bucknell (5)
- Buffalo (1)
- Cal Poly (4)
- Central Michigan (2)
- Chattanooga (2)
- Columbia (7)
- Cornell (5)
- Davidson (1)
- Drexel (3)
- Duke (1)
- Edinboro (4)
- Franklin & Marshall (1)
- Gardner–Webb (1)
- George Mason (4)
- Harvard (1)
- Illinois (8)
- Indiana (6)
- Iowa (9)
- Iowa State (10)
- Kent State (2)
- Lehigh (6)
- Little Rock (4)
- Lock Haven (4)
- Maryland (4)
- Michigan (6)
- Michigan State (2)
- Minnesota (6)
- Missouri (6)
- Morgan State (2)
- Navy (5)
- NC State (7)
- Nebraska (10)
- North Carolina (6)
- North Dakota State (5)
- Northern Colorado (2)
- Northern Illinois (2)
- Northern Iowa (5)
- Northwestern (2)
- Ohio (4)
- Ohio State (10)
- Oklahoma (7)
- Oklahoma State (10)
- Oregon State (6)
- Penn (6)
- Penn State (10)
- Pittsburgh (8)
- Princeton (5)
- Purdue (4)
- Rider (5)
- Rutgers (9)
- SIU Edwardsville (3)
- South Dakota State (6)
- Stanford (8)
- The Citadel (1)
- Utah Valley (5)
- Virginia (3)
- Virginia Tech (10)
- VMI (1)
- West Virginia (6)
- Wisconsin (8)
- Wyoming (6)

== Competition schedule ==
The NCAA announced the competition schedule on March 4, 2026.

Date	Time (ET)	Session	Events	TV
March 19	12:00 p.m.	Session I	Pigtails and First Round	ESPN2; ESPN+
March 19	7:00 p.m.	Session II	First Round Wrestle-Backs, Second Round, and Consolation Round	ESPN; ESPN+
March 20	12:00 p.m.	Session III	Quarterfinals, Second Round Wrestle-Backs, and Third Round Wrestle-Backs	ESPNU; ESPN+
March 20	8:00 p.m.	Session IV	Semifinals, Blood Round, and Fifth Round Wrestle-Backs	ESPN2; ESPN+
March 21	11:00 a.m.	Session V	Semifinal Wrestle-Backs, Third-Place Matches, Fifth-Place Matches, and Seventh-Place Matches	ESPNU; ESPN+
March 21	6:30 p.m.	Session VI	First-Place Matches	ESPN; ESPN+

== Team results ==
Rank	Team	Points
1st place, gold medalist(s)	Penn State	181.5
2nd place, silver medalist(s)	Oklahoma State	131.0
3rd place, bronze medalist(s)	Nebraska	100.5
4	Iowa	92.5
5	Ohio State	84.5
6	Stanford	67.5
7	Michigan	66.0
8	Iowa State	52.0
9	Minnesota	48.5
10	NC State	44.5

== Individual results ==
Weight	First	Second	Third	Fourth	Fifth	Sixth	Seventh	Eighth
125 lbs	Luke Lilledahl; Penn State	Marc-Anthony McGowan; Princeton	Nico Provo; Stanford	Vincent Robinson; NC State	Troy Spratley; Oklahoma State	Jacob Moran; Indiana	Jore Volk; Minnesota	Tyler Klinsky; Rider
133 lbs	Jax Forrest; Oklahoma State	Ben Davino; Ohio State	Aaron Seidel; Virginia Tech	Marcus Blaze; Penn State	Drake Ayala; Iowa	Tyler Knox; Stanford	Jacob Van Dee; Nebraska	Lucas Byrd; Illinois
141 lbs	Sergio Vega; Oklahoma State	Jesse Mendez; Ohio State	Luke Stanich; Lehigh	Brock Hardy; Nebraska	Carter Nogle; Air Force	Anthony Echemendia; Iowa State	CJ Composto; Penn	Wyatt Henson; Lock Haven
149 lbs	Aden Valencia; Stanford	Shayne Van Ness; Penn State	Lachlan McNeil; Michigan	Chance Lamer; Nebraska	Collin Gaj; Virginia Tech	Ryder Block; Iowa	Cross Wasilewski; Penn	Casey Swiderski; Oklahoma State
157 lbs	Landon Robideau; Oklahoma State	Antrell Taylor; Nebraska	PJ Duke; Penn State	Brandon Cannon; Ohio State	Kannon Webster; Illinois	Ty Watters; West Virginia	Cameron Catrabone; Michigan	Meyer Shapiro; Cornell
165 lbs	Mitchell Mesenbrink; Penn State	Mikey Caliendo; Iowa	Cesar Alvan; Columbia	Nicco Ruiz; Arizona State	Andrew Sparks; Minnesota	Joey Blaze; Purdue	Bryce Hepner; North Carolina	Paddy Gallagher; Ohio State
174 lbs	Levi Haines; Penn State	Christopher Minto; Nebraska	Patrick Kennedy; Iowa	Carson Kharchla; Ohio State	Cam Steed; Missouri	Danny Wask; Navy	Beau Mantanona; Michigan	MJ Gaitan; Iowa State
184 lbs	Max McEnelly; Minnesota	Rocco Welsh; Penn State	Aeoden Sinclair; Missouri	Caleb Campos; American	Brock Mantanona; Michigan	Angelo Ferrari; Iowa	Eddie Neitenbach; Wyoming	Zack Ryder; Oklahoma State
197 lbs	Josh Barr; Penn State	Cody Merrill; Oklahoma State	Stephen Little; Little Rock	Joey Novak; Wyoming	Camden McDanel; Nebraska	Angelo Posada; Stanford	Gabe Arnold; Iowa	Branson John; Maryland
285 lbs	Isaac Trumble; NC State	Yonger Bastida; Iowa State	Taye Ghadiali; Michigan	Konner Doucet; Oklahoma State	Ben Kueter; Iowa	AJ Ferrari; Nebraska	David Szuba; Arizona State	Christian Carroll; Wyoming

=== Finals matches ===
Weight	Champion		Result	Runner-up	
125 lbs	#1 Luke Lilledahl	Penn State	Dec 2–1	#10 Marc-Anthony McGowan	Princeton
133 lbs	#1 Jax Forrest	Oklahoma State	Dec 5–2	#2 Ben Davino	Ohio State
141 lbs	#2 Sergio Vega	Oklahoma State	Dec SV 4–1	#1 Jesse Mendez	Ohio State
149 lbs	#10 Aden Valencia	Stanford	SV–1 8–5	#1 Shayne Van Ness	Penn State
157 lbs	#5 Landon Robideau	Oklahoma State	Dec 4–2	#2 Antrell Taylor	Nebraska
165 lbs	#1 Mitchell Mesenbrink	Penn State	TF 20–4 (5:13)	#3 Mikey Caliendo	Iowa
174 lbs	#1 Levi Haines	Penn State	Dec 2–1	#3 Christopher Minto	Nebraska
184 lbs	#3 Max McEnelly	Minnesota	Dec 4–3	#1 Rocco Welsh	Penn State
197 lbs	#1 Josh Barr	Penn State	Dec 6–3	#7 Cody Merrill	Oklahoma State
285 lbs	#2 Isaac Trumble	NC State	Dec 5–0	#1 Yonger Bastida	Iowa State

== Medal table ==
Rank	Team	First	Second	Third	Total
1	Penn State	4	2	1	7
2	Oklahoma State	3	1	0	4
3	Stanford	1	0	1	2
4	Nebraska	0	2	0	2
4	Ohio State	0	2	0	2
6	NC State	1	0	0	1
6	Minnesota	1	0	0	1
8	Iowa	0	1	1	2
9	Iowa State	0	1	0	1
9	Princeton	0	1	0	1
11	Michigan	0	0	2	2
12	Columbia	0	0	1	1
12	Lehigh	0	0	1	1
12	Little Rock	0	0	1	1
12	Missouri	0	0	1	1
12	Virginia Tech	0	0	1	1
Totals (16 entries)		10	10	10	30

== Awards ==
Award	Recipient	Team	Ref.
NCAA Tournament Most Outstanding Wrestler	Mitchell Mesenbrink	Penn State	
NCAA Tournament Coach of the Year	Chris Ayres	Stanford	
