= Levi Haines =

American wrestler (born 2001)

Personal information
- Full name: Levi David Haines
- Born: August 5, 2004 (age 22) Arendtsville, Pennsylvania, U.S.

Sport
- Country: United States
- Sport: Wrestling
- Weight class: 79 kg (174 lb)
- Events: Freestyle and Folkstyle
- College team: Penn State
- Club: Nittany Lion Wrestling Club
- Coached by: Cael Sanderson
Medal record
Men's freestyle wrestling
Representing the United States
World Championships
Gold medal – first place	2026 Astana	79 kg
Silver medal – second place	2025 Zagreb	79 kg
Pan American Championships
Gold medal – first place	2026 Coralville	79 kg
World U23 Championships
Gold medal – first place	2025 Novi Sad	79 kg
U23 Pan American Championships
Gold medal – first place	2025 Queretaro	79 kg
Men's collegiate wrestling
NCAA Division I Championships
Gold medal – first place	2024 Kansas City	157 lb
Gold medal – first place	2026 Cleveland	174 lb
Silver medal – second place	2023 Tulsa	157 lb
Bronze medal – third place	2025 Philadelphia	174 lb
Big Ten Championships
Gold medal – first place	2023 Ann Arbor	157 lb
Gold medal – first place	2024 College Park	157 lb
Gold medal – first place	2025 Evanston	174 lb
Gold medal – first place	2026 State College	174 lb

Levi David Haines (born August 5, 2004) is an American freestyle and graduated folkstyle wrestler who competes at 79 kilograms. In freestyle, he was the silver medalist at the 2025 World Championships and the gold medalist at the 2025 U23 World Championships.

During his collegiate career, Haines became a two-time NCAA Division I National champion, four-time All-American and four-time Big Ten Conference champion out of Pennsylvania State University.

== Career ==
=== High school ===
Born and raised in Arendtsville, Pennsylvania, Haines started wrestling at an early age and went on to attend Biglerville High School. After earning a PIAA Class AA state title as a junior, which followed after two years as runner-up, Haines committed to wrestle for the Penn State Nittany Lions and decided to forgo his senior year of high school wrestling in order to compete in college open tournaments, claiming titles at the Edinboro Open and Franklin & Marshall Open. In freestyle, he was the 2021 U17 US World Team member at 71 kilograms, placing seventh at the U17 World Championships.

=== Pennsylvania State University ===
==== 2022–2023 ====
Forgoing a redshirt season, Haines went 25–2 as a true freshman, claimed the Big Ten Conference title, and placed second at the NCAA Division I National Championships at 157 pounds.

==== 2023–2024 ====
As a sophomore, Haines improved to 23–0 on the season, repeated as the Big Ten Conference champion, and claimed his first NCAA title after reaching his second straight finale at 157 pounds.

Haines then made his senior level debut at 74 kilograms at the 2024 US Olympic Team Trials in April, having qualified by winning the NCAA title. He fell to teammate Alex Facundo, as well as multiple-time All-American Alex Marinelli, failing to place.

==== 2024–2025 ====
In September 2024, Haines competed at the US World Team Trials up at 79 kilograms, where he went 4–2, earned a notable victory over U23 and U20 World champion Keegan O'Toole, and only fell to seven-time World and Olympic champion Jordan Burroughs and U20 World champion David Carr.

Back to folkstyle, Haines went up two weight classes to 174 pounds, racked up a 25–2 record, claimed his third Big Ten title, and placed third at the NCAA tournament, becoming a three-time All-American. Haines then claimed the U23 Pan American title at 79 kilograms in April.

In May, Haines competed at the US World Team Trials Challenge tournament and notably defeated NCAA champion Dean Hamiti to earn a spot at Final X and challenge Evan Wick for the US World Team spot in June. In a best-of-three series, Haines was able to outwrestle Wick in two straight bouts to earn the right to represent the United States at the World Championships.

In September, Haines made his World Championship debut and notably knocked off 2023 World champion Akhmed Usmanov from Russia, Military World champion Olonbayaryn Süldkhüü from Mongolia and Asian finalist Khidir Saipudinov from Bahrain on his way to the finals. He was able to claim the silver medal after falling to Georgios Kougioumtsidis from Greece by a one-point difference.

After accepting the spot on the team for the U23 World Championships as a Final X winner, Haines claimed his first World title after cruising to a gold medal with victories over Iran, Bulgaria, Russia and Turkey.

==== 2025–2026 ====
Back for his final year of collegiate wrestling, Haines went 26–0 during the season, won his second NCAA title and fourth Big Ten title, both over Christopher Minto of Nebraska.

In May, Haines claimed the gold medal at the Pan American Championships, with wins over Puerto Rico, Mexico, Canada and Colombia.

In June, Haines beat fellow Pan American champion Chance Marsteller twice in a row to claim a best-of-three series at Final X, making the US World Team for a second straight time.

== Freestyle record ==
Senior Freestyle Matches
Res.	Record	Opponent	Score	Date	Event	Location
2026 US World Team Trials (gold) at 79 kg
Win	26–6	(United States) Chance Marsteller	6–5	June 19, 2026	2026 Final X	(United States) Newark, New Jersey
Win	25–6	(United States) Chance Marsteller	6–1	June 19, 2026	2026 Final X	(United States) Newark, New Jersey
2026 Pan American Championships (gold) at 79 kg
Win	24–6	(Colombia) Jhoan Serna	TF 10–0	May 10, 2026	2026 Pan American Wrestling Championships	(United States) Coralville, Iowa
Win	23–6	(Canada) Patrik Leder	TF 13–2	May 10, 2026	2026 Pan American Wrestling Championships	(United States) Coralville, Iowa
Win	22–6	(Mexico) Sergio Espinoza	TF 10–0	May 10, 2026	2026 Pan American Wrestling Championships	(United States) Coralville, Iowa
Win	21–6	(Puerto Rico) Michael Labriola	TF 11–0	May 10, 2026	2026 Pan American Wrestling Championships	(United States) Coralville, Iowa
2025 U23 World Championships (gold) at 79 kg
Win	20–6	(Turkey) Metehan Yaprak	TF 11–1	October 24–25, 2025	2025 U23 World Championships	Novi Sad, Serbia
Win	19–6	Davud Daudov	11–4	October 24–25, 2025	2025 U23 World Championships	Novi Sad, Serbia
Win	18–6	(Bulgaria) Aykan Seid	TF 10–0	October 24–25, 2025	2025 U23 World Championships	Novi Sad, Serbia
Win	17–6	(Iran) Mehdi Yousefi	7–0	October 24–25, 2025	2025 U23 World Championships	Novi Sad, Serbia
2025 World Championships (silver) at 79 kg
Loss	16–6	(Greece) Georgios Kougioumtsidis	2–3	September 14–15, 2025	2025 World Championships	Zagreb, Croatia
Win	16–5	(Mongolia) Olonbayaryn Süldkhüü	4–1	September 14–15, 2025	2025 World Championships	Zagreb, Croatia
Win	15–5	Akhmed Usmanov	3–2	September 14–15, 2025	2025 World Championships	Zagreb, Croatia
Win	14–5	(South Korea) Seo Bum-gue	TF 10–0	September 14–15, 2025	2025 World Championships	Zagreb, Croatia
Win	13–5	(Bahrain) Khidir Saipudinov	5–2	September 14–15, 2025	2025 World Championships	Zagreb, Croatia
2025 Polyák Imre & Varga János Memorial Tournament DNP 79 kg
Loss	12–5	(Greece) Georgios Kougioumtsidis	3–7	Jul7 17, 2025	2025 Polyák Imre & Varga János Memorial Tournament	Budapest, Hungary
Win	12–4	(Bahrain) Khidir Saipudinov	10–5	Jul7 17, 2025	2025 Polyák Imre & Varga János Memorial Tournament	Budapest, Hungary
2025 US World Team Trials (gold) at 79 kg
Win	11–4	(United States) Evan Wick	6–1	June 14, 2025	2025 Final X	(United States) Newark, New Jersey
Win	10–4	(United States) Evan Wick	TF 10–0	June 14, 2025	2025 Final X	(United States) Newark, New Jersey
Win	9–4	(United States) Dean Hamiti Jr.	10–2	May 16–17, 2025	2025 US World Team Trials Challenge	(United States) Louisville, Kentucky
Win	8–4	(United States) Carson Kharchla	10–5	May 16–17, 2025	2025 US World Team Trials Challenge	(United States) Louisville, Kentucky
2025 U23 Pan American Championships (gold) at 79 kg
Win	7–4	(Mexico) Alan Vera Gomez	TF 11–0	April 12, 2025	2025 U23 Pan American Championships	Queretaro, Mexico
Win	—N/a	(Guatemala) Josue Alvarez	FF	April 12, 2025	2025 U23 Pan American Championships	Queretaro, Mexico
Win	6–4	(Canada) Jackson Glaslow	Fall	April 12, 2025	2025 U23 Pan American Championships	Queretaro, Mexico
Win	5–4	(Colombia) Josue Camargo	Fall	April 12, 2025	2025 U23 Pan American Championships	Queretaro, Mexico
2024 US World Team Trials 4th at 79 kg
Loss	4–4	(United States) David Carr	2–8	September 14–15, 2024	2024 US World Team Trials	(United States) Omaha, Nebraska
Win	4–3	(United States) Keegan O'Toole	6–0	September 14–15, 2024	2024 US World Team Trials	(United States) Omaha, Nebraska
Win	3–3	(United States) Evan Wick	Fall	September 14–15, 2024	2024 US World Team Trials	(United States) Omaha, Nebraska
Win	2–3	(United States) Matthew Bianchi	9–0	September 14–15, 2024	2024 US World Team Trials	(United States) Omaha, Nebraska
Loss	1–3	(United States) Jordan Burroughs	1–4	September 14–15, 2024	2024 US World Team Trials	(United States) Omaha, Nebraska
Win	1–2	(United States) Joey Bianchi	Fall	September 14–15, 2024	2024 US World Team Trials	(United States) Omaha, Nebraska
2024 US Olympic Team Trials DNP at 74 kg
Loss	0–2	(United States) Alex Marinelli	7–11	April 19–20, 2024	2024 US Olympic Team Trials	(United States) State College, Pennsylvania
Loss	0–1	(United States) Alex Facundo	0–6	April 19–20, 2024	2024 US Olympic Team Trials	(United States) State College, Pennsylvania
