= Jax Forrest =

American wrestler (born 2006)

Personal information
- Full name: Jaxen Patrick Forrest
- Born: October 13, 2006 (age 20) Chapel Hill, North Carolina, U.S.
- Weight: 61 kg (134 lb)

Sport
- Country: United States
- Sport: Wrestling
- Events: Freestyle and Folkstyle
- College team: Oklahoma State
- Club: Cowboy Regional Training Center; Young Guns Wrestling Club (formerly); Ranger Pride Wrestling Club (formerly)
- Coached by: David Taylor; Howard Forrest

Achievements and titles
- World finals: 5th (2025)
Medal record
Men's freestyle wrestling
Representing the United States
Pan American Championships
Gold medal – first place	2025 Monterrey	61 kg
US Open Championships
Gold medal – first place	2025 Las Vegas	61 kg
Bronze medal – third place	2026 Las Vegas	61 kg
U23 World Championships
Gold medal – first place	2025 Novi Sad	61 kg
U17 World Championships
Silver medal – second place	2022 Rome	55 kg
Men's collegiate wrestling
Representing the Oklahoma State Cowboys
NCAA Division I Championships
Gold medal – first place	2026 Cleveland	133 lb
Big 12 Championships
Gold medal – first place	2026 Tulsa	133 lb

Jaxen Patrick Forrest (born October 13, 2006) is an American freestyle and folkstyle wrestler who competes at 61 kilograms and 133 pounds. In freestyle, he was the 2025 US World Team member and National champion, as well as the U23 World champion.

In folkstyle, Forrest was an undefeated NCAA Division I National champion as well as a Big 12 Conference champion as a true-freshman in 2025–2026, out of the Oklahoma State University.

== Career ==
=== High school ===
Born and raised in Chapel Hill, North Carolina, Forrest moved to Johnstown, Pennsylvania to attend Bishop McCort High School. Forrest was a two-time PIAA Class AA state champion. While in high school, he competed at and won multiple collegiate open tournaments. At the freestyle age-group level, Forrest claimed a U17 World silver medal at 55 kg in 2022.

==== 2024 ====
In April 2024, Forrest made his senior level debut and qualified for the US Olympic Team Trials by claiming the US Last Chance Qualifier crown, racking up dominant wins over NCAA champion Nathan Tomasello, veteran Josh Rodriguez and All-American Devan Turner.

Later in the month, Forrest competed at the US Olympic Team Trials, where, after defeating All-American Liam Cronin, he suffered a loss to World champion Thomas Gilman. Competing for third-place after a pair of forfeit wins, he was defeated by U17 World champion Marcus Blaze.

In September, Forrest moved up to 61 kilograms and competed at the US World Team Trials, where he went 3–1 with a lone loss to four-time All-American Austin DeSanto and technical fall wins over All-Americans Nico Provo and Liam Cronin.

==== 2025 ====
In February 2025, Forrest, a high school junior, committed to wrestle for David Taylor at the Oklahoma State University.

In April, Forrest claimed the US Open National championship at 61 kilograms, notably defeating NCAA champions Nahshon Garrett in the quarterfinals and Seth Gross in the finals, both by technical fall. As the winner of the tournament, Forrest qualified for Final X, where he would face World champion Vito Arujau for the US World Team spot. Originally scheduled to take place at the Final X event, the series was postponed after Arujau's request following an injury. In the meantime, Forrest claimed a Pan American title after three victories over foreign opposition, in May.

In July, Forrest faced Arujau at the Fargo National tournament, clinching up two upset victories in a row to dethrone the World champion and become the United States' senior level rep at 61 kilograms for the 2025 World Championships

In September, Forrest competed at the World Championships, where he racked up notable wins over Asian champions Takara Suda from Japan and Taiyrbek Zhumashbek Uulu from Kyrgyzstan, before falling to World and Olympic champion Zaur Uguev from Russia in the semifinals and U23 World finalist Assylzhan Yessengeldi from Kazakhstan in the bronze-medal match, finishing in fifth place.

A month after the senior-level 2025 World Championships were held in September, he won gold at the U23 World Championships at 61 kg in October 2025, at the age of nineteen.

On December 30, 2025, Forrest, a high school senior, announced he would be graduating early in order to enroll at Oklahoma State University and compete in the NCAA during the second semester of the 2025–2026 season.

=== Oklahoma State University ===
==== 2025–2026 ====
On January 11, 2026, Forrest made his Oklahoma State wrestling debut, pinning his opponent in 47 seconds, as Oklahoma State shut out the Oklahoma Sooners in their dual meet. After his dual meet match against Iowa on February 22, 2026, Forrest officially burned his redshirt, with the intention to compete in the 2026 post-season. Forrest won the 133-pound title at the 2026 Big 12 Wrestling Championships, and was named the Most Outstanding Wrestler of the tournament.

At the NCAA Wrestling Championships, Forrest delivered a dominant performance en route to an NCAA title. He scored a fall in the first round followed by two technical falls in the second round and quarterfinals, all three finishes coming in during the first period. In the semifinals, Forrest defeated Aaron Seidel from Virginia Tech by a 14–3 major decision, in a rematch of their 10–9 match during regular season, where Forrest had also been victorious. In the finals, Forrest posted a 5–2 score over Ben Davino from Ohio State, who had previously not been taken down during his college career.

Onto freestyle season, Forrest competed at the US Open National Championships held in April, where he was knocked off in the semifinals by Ben Davino in a rematch from the NCAA finals held a month earlier. He defeated All-American Michael McGee and avenged a loss to Austin DeSanto to come back for third-place.

In May, Forrest competed at the US World Team Trials Challenge, in a second attempt to qualify for Final X. He took out All-American Aaron Seidel on points to set up a rematch with Davino, where he was victorious by technical fall. This result set up a best-of-three showdown against US Open and U20 World champion Marcus Blaze, which took place in June. Forrest was defeated two matches to one.

== Freestyle record ==
Senior Freestyle Matches
Res.	Record	Opponent	Score	Date	Event	Location
2026 US World Team Trials (silver) at 61 kg
Loss	32–8	(United States) Marcus Blaze	2–5	June 19, 2026	2026 Final X	(United States) Newark, New Jersey
Win	33–7	(United States) Marcus Blaze	6–1	June 19, 2026	2026 Final X	(United States) Newark, New Jersey
Loss	32–7	(United States) Marcus Blaze	2–2	June 19, 2026	2026 Final X	(United States) Newark, New Jersey
Win	32–6	(United States) Ben Davino	TF 11–1	May 14–15, 2026	2026 US World Team Trials Challenge	(United States) Louisville, Kentucky
Win	31–6	(United States) Aaron Seidel	9–4	May 14–15, 2026	2026 US World Team Trials Challenge	(United States) Louisville, Kentucky
2026 US Open Nationals (bronze) at 61 kg
Win	30–6	(United States) Austin DeSanto	5–0	April 24–25, 2026	2026 US Open National Championships	(United States) Las Vegas, Nevada
Win	29–6	(United States) Michael McGee	TF 10–0	April 24–25, 2026	2026 US Open National Championships	(United States) Las Vegas, Nevada
Loss	28–6	(United States) Ben Davino	4–8	April 24–25, 2026	2026 US Open National Championships	(United States) Las Vegas, Nevada
Win	28–5	(United States) Kyle Burwick	TF 10–0	April 24–25, 2026	2026 US Open National Championships	(United States) Las Vegas, Nevada
Win	27–5	(United States) Tallon Chambers	TF 10–0	April 24–25, 2026	2026 US Open National Championships	(United States) Las Vegas, Nevada
2025 World Championships 5th at 61 kg
Loss	26–5	(Kazakhstan) Assylzhan Yessengeldi	8–10	September 13–14, 2025	2025 World Championships	Zagreb, Croatia
Loss	26–4	Zaur Uguev	3–10	September 13–14, 2025	2025 World Championships	Zagreb, Croatia
Win	26–3	(Kyrgyzstan) Taiyrbek Zhumashbek Uulu	13–8	September 13–14, 2025	2025 World Championships	Zagreb, Croatia
Win	25–3	(Japan) Takara Suda	7–2	September 13–14, 2025	2025 World Championships	Zagreb, Croatia
Win	24–3	(South Korea) Han Sang-boum	TF 10–0	September 13–14, 2025	2025 World Championships	Zagreb, Croatia
2025 US World Team Trials (gold) at 61 kg
Win	23–3	(United States) Vito Arujau	7–2	July 14, 2025	2025 Final X	(United States) Newark, New Jersey
Win	22–3	(United States) Vito Arujau	4–3	July 14, 2025	2025 Final X	(United States) Newark, New Jersey
2025 Pan American Championships (gold) at 61 kg
Win	21–3	(Puerto Rico) Joseph Silva	TF 11–0	May 10, 2025	2025 Pan American Championships	Monterrey, Mexico
Win	20–3	(Ecuador) Josh Kramer	TF 10–0	May 10, 2025	2025 Pan American Championships	Monterrey, Mexico
Win	19–3	(Guatemala) Esteban Perez	TF 10–0	May 10, 2025	2025 Pan American Championships	Monterrey, Mexico
2025 US Open (gold) at 61 kg
Win	18–3	(United States) Seth Gross	TF 19–8	April 25–26, 2025	2025 US Open National Championships	(United States) Las Vegas, Nevada
Win	17–3	(United States) Ben Davino	4–0	April 25–26, 2025	2025 US Open National Championships	(United States) Las Vegas, Nevada
Win	16–3	(United States) Nahshon Garrett	TF 10–0	April 25–26, 2025	2025 US Open National Championships	(United States) Las Vegas, Nevada
Win	15–3	(United States) Kyle Gollhofer	TF 10–0	April 25–26, 2025	2025 US Open National Championships	(United States) Las Vegas, Nevada
Win	14–3	(United States) Nathaniel Johnson	TF 13–0	April 25–26, 2025	2025 US Open National Championships	(United States) Las Vegas, Nevada
2024 US World Team Trials (bronze) at 61 kg
Win	13-3	(United States) Liam Cronin	TF 16–6	September 14–15, 2024	2024 US World Team Trials Challenge	(United States) Omaha, Nebraska
Win	12-3	(United States) Nahshon Garrett	Forfeit	September 14–15, 2024	2024 US World Team Trials Challenge	(United States) Omaha, Nebraska
Win	11-3	(United States) Nasir Bailey	Forfeit	September 14–15, 2024	2024 US World Team Trials Challenge	(United States) Omaha, Nebraska
Win	10–3	(United States) Kyle Burwick	TF 16–6	September 14–15, 2024	2024 US World Team Trials Challenge	(United States) Omaha, Nebraska
Loss	9–3	(United States) Austin DeSanto	6–9	September 14–15, 2024	2024 US World Team Trials Challenge	(United States) Omaha, Nebraska
Win	9–2	(United States) Nico Provo	TF 10–0	September 14–15, 2024	2024 US World Team Trials Challenge	(United States) Omaha, Nebraska
2024 US Olympic Team Trials 4th at 57 kg
Loss	8–2	(United States) Marcus Blaze	1–8	April 19–20, 2024	2024 US Olympic Team Trials	(United States) State College, Pennsylvania
Win	8-1	(United States) Zane Richards	Forfeit	April 19–20, 2024	2024 US Olympic Team Trials	(United States) State College, Pennsylvania
Win	7-1	(United States) Nick Suriano	Forfeit	April 19–20, 2024	2024 US Olympic Team Trials	(United States) State College, Pennsylvania
Win	6-1	(United States) Daniel DeShazer	5-4	April 19–20, 2024	2024 US Olympic Team Trials	(United States) State College, Pennsylvania
Loss	5–1	(United States) Thomas Gilman	4–5	April 19–20, 2024	2024 US Olympic Team Trials	(United States) State College, Pennsylvania
Win	5–0	(United States) Liam Cronin	TF 10–0	April 19–20, 2024	2024 US Olympic Team Trials	(United States) State College, Pennsylvania
2024 US Last Chance Qualifier (gold) at 57 kg
Win	4–0	(United States) Nathan Tomasello	TF 10–0	April 6–7, 2024	2024 US Last Chance Qualifier	(United States) Fairfax, Virginia
Win	3–0	(United States) Josh Rodriguez	13–4	April 6–7, 2024	2024 US Last Chance Qualifier	(United States) Fairfax, Virginia
Win	2–0	(United States) Devan Turner	TF 10–0	April 6–7, 2024	2024 US Last Chance Qualifier	(United States) Fairfax, Virginia
Win	1–0	(United States) Gary Steen	TF 12–2	April 6–7, 2024	2024 US Last Chance Qualifier	(United States) Fairfax, Virginia

== NCAA record ==
NCAA Division I Record
Res.	Record	Opponent	Score	Date	Event	Location
Win	24–0	(United States) Jacob Van Dee	TF 21-6	November 13, 2026	Oklahoma State vs. Nebraska	(United States) Stillwater, Oklahoma
Win	23–0	(United States) Cole Hagerty	TF 18-2	November 8, 2026	Oklahoma State vs. Drexel	(United States) Stillwater, Oklahoma
2026 Cowboy Invitational (gold) at 133 lbs
Win	22–0	(United States) T.K. Davis	TF 20-4	November 1, 2026	Cowboy Invitational	(United States) Stillwater, Oklahoma
Win	21–0	(United States) Justyce Zuniga	Fall	November 1, 2026	Cowboy Invitational	(United States) Stillwater, Oklahoma
Win	20–0	(United States) Izaac Aravalo	Fall	November 1, 2026	Cowboy Invitational	(United States) Stillwater, Oklahoma
Start of 2026–2027 Season (sophomore year)
2026 NCAA Division I Championships (gold) at 133 lbs
Win	19–0	(United States) Ben Davino	5–2	March 19–21, 2026	2026 NCAA Division I Championships	(United States) Cleveland, Ohio
Win	18–0	(United States) Aaron Seidel	MD 14–3	March 19–21, 2026	2026 NCAA Division I Championships	(United States) Cleveland, Ohio
Win	17–0	(United States) Markel Baker	TF 18–3	March 19–21, 2026	2026 NCAA Division I Championships	(United States) Cleveland, Ohio
Win	16–0	(United States) T.K. Davis	TF 16–1	March 19–21, 2026	2026 NCAA Division I Championships	(United States) Cleveland, Ohio
Win	15–0	(United States) Carter Schmidt	Fall	March 19–21, 2026	2026 NCAA Division I Championships	(United States) Cleveland, Ohio
2026 Big 12 Championships (gold) at 133 lbs
Win	14–0	(United States) Kyler Larkin	MD 15-2	March 6-7, 2026	2026 Big 12 Championships	(United States) Tulsa, Oklahoma
Win	13–0	(United States) Julian Farber	TF 21-6	March 6-7, 2026	2026 Big 12 Championships	(United States) Tulsa, Oklahoma
Win	12–0	(United States) Cale Seaton	TF 19-4	March 6-7, 2026	2026 Big 12 Championships	(United States) Tulsa, Oklahoma
Win	11–0	(United States) Garrett Grice	TF 15-0	March 6-7, 2026	2026 Big 12 Championships	(United States) Tulsa, Oklahoma
Win	10–0	(United States) Drake Ayala	TF 19-3	February 22, 2026	Oklahoma State vs. Iowa	(United States) Stillwater, Oklahoma
Win	9–0	(United States) Aaron Seidel	10-9	February 15, 2026	Oklahoma State at Virginia Tech	(United States) Blacksburg, Virginia
Win	8–0	(Cuba) Osmany Diversent	TF 16-0	February 1, 2026	Oklahoma State vs. Iowa State	(United States) Stillwater, Oklahoma
Win	7–0	(United States) Julian Farber	TF 19-4	January 30, 2026	Oklahoma State vs. Northern Iowa	(United States) Stillwater, Oklahoma
Win	6–0	(United States) Gage Walker	TF 16-1	January 23 , 2026	Oklahoma State at Missouri	(United States) Columbia, Missouri
2026 Cyclone Open (gold) at 133 lbs
Win	5–0	(Cuba) Reineri Ortega	4-0	January 18, 2026	Cyclone Open	(United States) Ames, Iowa
Win	4–0	(Cuba) Osmany Diversent	Fall	January 18, 2026	Cyclone Open	(United States) Ames, Iowa
Win	3–0	(United States) Joey Ruzic	TF 17-1	January 18, 2026	Cyclone Open	(United States) Ames, Iowa
Win	2–0	(United States) Massey Odiotti	TF 19-4	January 18, 2026	Cyclone Open	(United States) Ames, Iowa
Win	1–0	(United States) Carter Schmidt	Fall	January 11, 2026	Oklahoma State vs. Oklahoma	(United States) Stillwater, Oklahoma
Start of 2025–2026 Season (freshman year)

=== Stats ===
Season	Year	School	Rank	Weigh Class	Record	Win	Bonus
2027	Sophomore	Oklahoma State University	#1 (1st)	133	4-0	100.00%	100.00%
2026	Freshman	Oklahoma State University	#1 (1st)	133	19–0	100.00%	84.21%
Career					23–0	100.00%	86.96%
