= Ben Davino =

American wrestler (born 2006)

Personal information
- Full name: Benjamin Adam Davino
- Born: July 24, 2006 (age 20) South Elgin, Illinois, U.S.
- Weight: 61 kg (134 lb)
- Website: bendavino.com

Sport
- Country: United States
- Sport: Wrestling
- Events: Freestyle and Folkstyle
- College team: Ohio State
- Club: Ohio Regional Training Center
- Coached by: Tom Ryan
Medal record
Men's freestyle wrestling
Representing the United States
US Open Championships
| Silver medal – second place | 2026 Las Vegas | 61 kg |
World U23 Championships
| Gold medal – first place | 2026 Las Vegas | 61 kg |
Men's collegiate wrestling
Representing the Ohio State Buckeyes
NCAA Division I Championships
| Silver medal – second place | 2026 Cleveland | 133 lb |
Big Ten Championships
| Gold medal – first place | 2026 State College | 133 lb |

Benjamin Adam Davino (born July 24, 2006) is an American freestyle and folkstyle wrestler who competes at 61 kilograms and 133 pounds. In freestyle, he was the US National runner-up in 2026.

In folkstyle, Davino was an NCAA Division I National runner-up as well as the Big Ten champion as a 19-year-old redshirt-freshman in 2025–2026, out of the Ohio State University.

== Career ==
=== High school ===
Born and raised in the state of Illinois, Davino started wrestling at the age of six, and went on to attend St. Charles East High School. With a record of 181–1, he racked up four 3A state titles by the end of his career. Nationally, Davino was one of the top-ranked high schoolers, winning folkstyle tournaments such as Super 32 and Ironman, as well as freestyle tournaments such as the US Fargo National Championships and the U17 US World Team Trials. At the 2023 U17 World Championships, Davino fell in the quarterfinals.

In 2023, Davino, a three-time state champion at the time, committed to the Ohio State University, and graduated in 2023–2024.

=== Ohio State University ===
==== 2024–2025 ====
Davino wore a redshirt during his first season in college and compiled a 19–1 record, claiming crowns from the Clarion Open and the Franklin & Marshall Open and posting a 4–0 mark in dual meets.

Davino then made his senior freestyle debut in April 2025, at the US Open National Championships. He notably defeated NCAA champion Nico Megaludis, World silver medalist Daton Fix and four-time All-American Austin DeSanto, though falling to U17 World silver medalist Jax Forrest and U17 World champion Marcus Blaze to place fourth.

==== 2025–2026 ====
During his freshman campaign, Davino went 24–1 during regular season, before capturing the Big Ten Conference title and avenging his lone loss to Penn State's Marcus Blaze in the finals. At the NCAA tournament, he made his way into the finals as the second-seed with notable wins over returning NCAA champion from Illinois Lucas Byrd and once again over Blaze. In the finals, Davino was defeated by U23 World champion Jax Forrest from Oklahoma State.

Davino went back to freestyle action in April 2026, making his way onto the US Open National finals after defeating Austin DeSanto for a second time and Jax Forrest in a rematch from the NCAA finals. In the first-place match, he was defeated by Marcus Blaze by a score of four points to one to claim the silver medal.

In May, Davino competed at the US World Team Trials Challenge, in a second attempt to qualify for Final X. He took out NCAA champion Nathan Tomasello on points to set up a rematch with Forrest, where he was in the wrong end of a technical fall to place second.

==== 2026–2027 ====
Returning to freestyle wrestling, Davino was scheduled to face RAF Bantamweight Champion Austin DeSanto for the championship. However, for undisclosed reasons, the bout was removed and he instead faced four-time European champion from Armenia Arsen Harutyunyan on July 18, 2026 at RAF 11, falling on points. Next, he competed at RAF 12, losing to World Champion from Japan Masanosuke Ono on points.

== Freestyle record ==
Senior Freestyle Matches
| Res. | Record | Opponent | Score | Date | Event | Location |
|---|---|---|---|---|---|---|
| Loss | 9–6 | (Japan) Masanosuke Ono | 0-4 | August 22, 2026 | RAF 12 | (United States) Cleveland, Ohio |
| Loss | 9–5 | (Armenia) Arsen Harutyunyan | 5–6 | July 18, 2026 | RAF 11 | (United States) Milwaukee, Wisconsin |
2026 US World Team Trials 4th at 61 kg
| Loss | | (United States) Austin DeSanto | FF | June 19, 2026 | 2026 Final X | (United States) Newark, New Jersey |
| Loss | 9–4 | (United States) Jax Forrest | TF 1–11 | May 14–15, 2026 | 2026 US World Team Trials Challenge | (United States) Louisville, Kentucky |
| Win | 9–3 | (United States) Nathan Tomasello | 3–1 | May 14–15, 2026 | 2026 US World Team Trials Challenge | (United States) Louisville, Kentucky |
2026 US Open (silver) at 61 kg
| Loss | 8–3 | (United States) Marcus Blaze | 1–4 | April 24–25, 2026 | 2026 US Open National Championships | (United States) Las Vegas, Nevada |
| Win | 8–2 | (United States) Jax Forrest | 8–4 | April 24–25, 2026 | 2026 US Open National Championships | (United States) Las Vegas, Nevada |
| Win | 7–2 | (United States) Austin DeSanto | 3–0 | April 24–25, 2026 | 2026 US Open National Championships | (United States) Las Vegas, Nevada |
| Win | 6–2 | (United States) Gavin Caprella | TF 10–0 | April 24–25, 2026 | 2026 US Open National Championships | (United States) Las Vegas, Nevada |
| Win | 5–2 | (United States) Christian Guzman | TF 11–0 | April 24–25, 2026 | 2026 US Open National Championships | (United States) Las Vegas, Nevada |
2025 US Open 4th at 61 kg
| Loss | 4–2 | (United States) Marcus Blaze | 0–7 | April 25–26, 2025 | 2025 US Open National Championships | (United States) Las Vegas, Nevada |
| Win | 4–1 | (United States) Austin DeSanto | 6–4 | April 25–26, 2025 | 2025 US Open National Championships | (United States) Las Vegas, Nevada |
| Loss | 3–1 | (United States) Jax Forrest | 0–4 | April 25–26, 2025 | 2025 US Open National Championships | (United States) Las Vegas, Nevada |
| Win | 3–0 | (United States) Daton Fix | VIN (8–0) | April 25–26, 2025 | 2025 US Open National Championships | (United States) Las Vegas, Nevada |
| Win | 2–0 | (United States) Nico Megaludis | 3–1 | April 25–26, 2025 | 2025 US Open National Championships | (United States) Las Vegas, Nevada |
| Win | 1–0 | (United States) Clay Gates | TF 10–0 | April 25–26, 2025 | 2025 US Open National Championships | (United States) Las Vegas, Nevada |

== NCAA record ==
NCAA Division I Record (incomplete)
| Res. | Record | Opponent | Score | Date | Event |
End of 2025–2026 Season (freshman year)
2026 NCAA Division I Championships (silver) at 133 lbs
| Loss | 29–2 | Jax Forrest | 2–5 | March 19–21, 2026 | 2026 NCAA Division I Wrestling Championships |
| Win | 28–1 | Marcus Blaze | TB-1 3–2 | March 19–21, 2026 | 2026 NCAA Division I Wrestling Championships |
| Win | 27–1 | Lucas Byrd | MD 14–3 | March 19–21, 2026 | 2026 NCAA Division I Wrestling Championships |
| Win | 26–1 | Tyler Knox | TF 21–5 | March 19–21, 2026 | 2026 NCAA Division I Wrestling Championships |
| Win | 25–1 | Gable Strickland | TF 17–2 | March 19–21, 2026 | 2026 NCAA Division I Wrestling Championships |
Regular season: 24–1 (1 fall, 13 technical falls, 2 major decisions, 8 decisions)
Start of 2025–2026 Season (RS-freshman year)
End of 2024–2025 Season (RS year)
Regular season: 18–1 (1 fall, 5 technical falls, 7 major decisions, 5 decisions)
Start of 2024–2025 Season (RS year)

=== Stats ===
| Season | Year | School | Rank | Weigh Class | Record | Win | Bonus |
|---|---|---|---|---|---|---|---|
| 2026 | Freshman | Ohio State University | #2 (2nd) | 133 | 31–2 | 93.93% | 60.61% |
| 2025 | Redshirt | Ohio State University | – | 133 | 18–1 | 94.74% | 65.00% |
| Career | | | | | 47–3 | 94.00% | 62.28% |
