= Marcus Blaze =

American wrestler (born 2006)

Personal information
- Full name: Marcus Glenn Blaze
- Born: November 23, 2006 (age 19) Clinton, Michigan, U.S.
- Home town: Perrysburg, Ohio, U.S.
- Weight: 61 kg (134 lb)

Sport
- Country: United States
- Sport: Wrestling
- Events: Freestyle and Folkstyle
- Club: Nittany Lion Wrestling Club; Perrysburg Wrestling Club (formerly)
- Coached by: Cael Sanderson
Medal record
Men's freestyle wrestling
Representing the United States
World Championships
| Bronze medal – third place | 2026 Astana | 61 kg |
US National Championships
| Gold medal – first place | 2026 Las Vegas | 61 kg |
| Bronze medal – third place | 2025 Las Vegas | 61 kg |
Grand Prix
| Gold medal – first place | 2026 Warsaw | 61 kg |
U20 World Championships
| Gold medal – first place | 2025 Samokov | 61 kg |
| Bronze medal – third place | 2024 Pontevedra | 61 kg |
U17 World Championships
| Gold medal – first place | 2023 Istanbul | 55 kg |
Men's collegiate wrestling
Representing the Penn State Nittany Lions
Big Ten Championships
| Silver medal – second place | 2026 State College | 133 lb |

Marcus Glenn Blaze (born November 23, 2006) is an American freestyle and folkstyle wrestler who competes at 61 kilograms and 133 pounds. In freestyle, he was the 2025 U20 World champion, upgrading a bronze medal from the 2024 edition, the US World Team Member in 2026 and the U17 World champion in 2023.

Blaze was an NCAA Division I All-American for the Penn State Nittany Lions in 2026, and will be a sophomore for the 2026–2027 season.

== Career ==
=== High school ===
==== 2022–2023 ====
Originally from Michigan, Blaze started wrestling at an early age alongside his brother Joey before moving to Perrysburg, Ohio. A four-time OHSAA state champion out of Perrysburg High School, Blaze is one of the top-ranked high school wrestlers in his weight class.

In 2023, he defeated top-ranked in NCAA Division I Matt Ramos during a college open while a high school junior. In the U17 freestyle age group, Blaze claimed a U.S. national championship and a world championship at 55 kilograms in 2023.

==== 2024 ====
Making his senior level debut, Blaze competed at the US Olympic Team Trials at 57 kilograms in April 2024, as a high school junior. After a first-round loss to two-time NCAA champion Nick Suriano, he came back to defeat NCAA champion Nico Megaludis and U20 World finalist Luke Lilledahl before receiving a forfeit to make the third-place match, where he defeated U17 World finalist Jax Forrest to make the US National team.

Back to the age group, now in his first year of U20, Blaze made the US World Team at 61 kilograms in August and earned a bronze medal from the U20 World Championships in September, only losing to eventual 2024 world champion Masanosuke Ono from Japan.

A week after his bronze-medal performance, Blaze went back to the senior level to compete at the US World Team Trials. Storming to the finals, he took out 2018 NCAA champion Seth Gross, 2016 NCAA champion Nahshon Garrett, and 2021 world silver medalist Daton Fix to make the best-of-three. In the finals, he was defeated back to back by reigning world champion Vito Arujau, earning second place.

Then a high school senior, Blaze announced in November that he had committed to wrestle for the Penn State Nittany Lions.

==== 2025 ====
In April, Blaze placed third at the US Open National Championships, notably defeating NCAA champion Nathan Tomasello and three-time All-American Michael McGee, though falling to NCAA champion Seth Gross.

In May, Blaze bumped up to 65 kilograms to compete at the US World Team Trials, where he was victorious in four out of five matches, notably defeating U17 World champion Bo Bassett and falling to two-time NCAA champion Jesse Mendez. In June, he defeated Brock Hardy in a true-third match at Final X to earn a spot on the US National Team and therefore, the U23 US World Team.

=== Pennsylvania State University ===
==== 2025–2026 ====
In October 2025, Blaze competed at the U23 World Championships before folkstyle season kicked off, where he was knocked off in the first round by returning medalist Bilol Sharip Uulu from Kyrgyzstan.

During his freshman season for the Nittany Lions, Blaze went 19–0 at 133 pounds during regular season, though would suffer his first loss in the Big Ten Conference finals to fellow freshman Ben Davino from Ohio State, in a rematch from earlier in the year. At the NCAA tournament, Blaze would go 4–2 to place fourth and become an All-American, notably defeating NCAA runner-up Drake Ayala from Iowa though falling to Davino and Aaron Seidel from Virginia Tech.

Back to freestyle action, Blaze became the US National champion in April 2026 and qualified to Final X, notably knocking off NCAA finalist Ben Davino and NCAA champion Seth Gross. In June, he claimed the US World Team spot by defeating NCAA and U23 World champion Jax Forrest in a best-of-three series, two matches to one. Blaze is now set to represent the United States at the World Championships in October.

== Freestyle record ==
Senior Freestyle Matches
| Res. | Record | Opponent | Score | Date | Event | Location |
2026 Waclaw Ziolkowski Memorial (gold) at 61 kg
| Win | 28–6 | (United States) Kyle Burwick | TF 11-0 | August 29–30, 2026 | 2026 35th Waclaw Ziolkowski Memorial | Warsaw, Poland |
| Win | 27–6 | (United States) Josh Rodriguez | Forfeit | August 29–30, 2026 | 2026 35th Waclaw Ziolkowski Memorial | Warsaw, Poland |
| Win | 26–6 | (United States) Austin DeSanto | 5-0 | August 29–30, 2026 | 2026 35th Waclaw Ziolkowski Memorial | Warsaw, Poland |
| Win | 25-6 | (Ukraine) Yaroslaw Hurskyy | TF 11–0 | August 29–30, 2026 | 2026 35th Waclaw Ziolkowski Memorial | Warsaw, Poland |
2026 US World Team Trials (gold) at 61 kg
| Win | 24–6 | (United States) Jax Forrest | 5–2 | June 19, 2026 | 2026 Final X | (United States) Newark, New Jersey |
| Loss | 23–6 | (United States) Jax Forrest | 1–6 | June 19, 2026 | 2026 Final X | (United States) Newark, New Jersey |
| Win | 23–5 | (United States) Jax Forrest | 2–2 | June 19, 2026 | 2026 Final X | (United States) Newark, New Jersey |
2026 US Open Nationals (gold) at 61 kg
| Win | 22–5 | (United States) Ben Davino | 4–1 | April 24–25, 2026 | 2026 US Open National Championships | (United States) Las Vegas, Nevada |
| Win | 21–5 | (United States) Seth Gross | 6–1 | April 24–25, 2026 | 2026 US Open National Championships | (United States) Las Vegas, Nevada |
| Win | 20–5 | (United States) Michael McGee | TF 10–0 | April 24–25, 2026 | 2026 US Open National Championships | (United States) Las Vegas, Nevada |
| Win | 19–5 | (United States) Quade Smith | TF 11–0 | April 24–25, 2026 | 2026 US Open National Championships | (United States) Las Vegas, Nevada |
2025 US World Team Trials (bronze) at 65 kg
| Win | 18–5 | (United States) Brock Hardy | 8–2 | June 14, 2025 | 2025 Final X | (United States) Newark, New Jersey |
| Win | 17–5 | (United States) Carter Young | 4–0 | May 16–17, 2025 | 2025 US World Team Trials Challenge | (United States) Louisville, Kentucky |
| Win | 16–5 | (United States) Bo Bassett | 5–1 | May 16–17, 2025 | 2025 US World Team Trials Challenge | (United States) Louisville, Kentucky |
| Win | 15–5 | (United States) Aden Valencia | 2–1 | May 16–17, 2025 | 2025 US World Team Trials Challenge | (United States) Louisville, Kentucky |
| Loss | 14–5 | (United States) Jesse Mendez | 1–4 | May 16–17, 2025 | 2025 US World Team Trials Challenge | (United States) Louisville, Kentucky |
| Win | 14–4 | (United States) Carter Young | 9–4 | May 16–17, 2025 | 2025 US World Team Trials Challenge | (United States) Louisville, Kentucky |
2025 US Open Nationals (bronze) at 61 kg
| Win | 13–4 | (United States) Ben Davino | 7–0 | April 25–26, 2025 | 2025 US Open National Championships | (United States) Las Vegas, Nevada |
| Win | 12–4 | (United States) Michael McGee | TF 10–0 | April 25–26, 2025 | 2025 US Open National Championships | (United States) Las Vegas, Nevada |
| Loss | 11–4 | (United States) Seth Gross | Fall | April 25–26, 2025 | 2025 US Open National Championships | (United States) Las Vegas, Nevada |
| Win | 11–3 | (United States) Nathan Tomasello | 2–1 | April 25–26, 2025 | 2025 US Open National Championships | (United States) Las Vegas, Nevada |
| Win | 10–3 | (United States) Fernando Barreto | TF 11–1 | April 25–26, 2025 | 2025 US Open National Championships | (United States) Las Vegas, Nevada |
| Win | 9–3 | (United States) Juan Diaz | TF 10–0 | April 25–26, 2025 | 2025 US Open National Championships | (United States) Las Vegas, Nevada |
2024 US World Team Trials (silver) at 61 kg
| Loss | 8–3 | (United States) Vito Arujau | 1–3 | September 14–15, 2024 | 2024 US World Team Trials Challenge | (United States) Omaha, Nebraska |
| Loss | 8–2 | (United States) Vito Arujau | 1–2 | September 14–15, 2024 | 2024 US World Team Trials Challenge | (United States) Omaha, Nebraska |
| Win | 8–1 | (United States) Daton Fix | 2—2 | September 14–15, 2024 | 2024 US World Team Trials Challenge | (United States) Omaha, Nebraska |
| Win | 7–1 | (United States) Nahshon Garrett | 5–0 | September 14–15, 2024 | 2024 US World Team Trials Challenge | (United States) Omaha, Nebraska |
| Win | 6–1 | (United States) Seth Gross | 7–5 | September 14–15, 2024 | 2024 US World Team Trials Challenge | (United States) Omaha, Nebraska |
| Win | 5–1 | (United States) Kyle Burwick | 6–2 | September 14–15, 2024 | 2024 US World Team Trials Challenge | (United States) Omaha, Nebraska |
2024 US Olympic Team Trials (bronze) at 57 kg
| Win | 4–1 | (United States) Jax Forrest | 8–1 | April 19–20, 2024 | 2024 US Olympic Team Trials | (United States) State College, Pennsylvania |
| Win | 3-1 | (United States) Daton Fix | Forfeit | April 19–20, 2024 | 2024 US Olympic Team Trials | (United States) State College, Pennsylvania |
| Win | 2–1 | (United States) Luke Lilledahl | 5–1 | April 19–20, 2024 | 2024 US Olympic Team Trials | (United States) State College, Pennsylvania |
| Win | 1–1 | (United States) Nico Megaludis | 2–2 | April 19–20, 2024 | 2024 US Olympic Team Trials | (United States) State College, Pennsylvania |
| Loss | 0–1 | (United States) Nick Suriano | 2–4 | April 19–20, 2024 | 2024 US Olympic Team Trials | (United States) State College, Pennsylvania |
