= Final X (2026) =

2026 wrestling event

- Promotion: USA Wrestling
- Date: June 19, 2026
- Venue: Prudential Center
- City: Newark, New Jersey

Event chronology
Final X (2025)	Final X

Final X was a freestyle wrestling event that took place on June 19, 2026, at the Prudential Center in Newark, New Jersey.

It will be the twelfth Final X event produced by USA Wrestling, and will air live on FloSports.

== Background ==
Tickets for the event went on sale through Ticketmaster on February 17, 2026.

Finalists in each of the twenty weight classes will wrestle a best-of-three series, and the winners will represent Team USA at the 2026 World Wrestling Championships.

Eight finalists were awarded automatic bids for having won medals at the 2025 World Wrestling Championships: Helen Maroulis, Real Woods, Kennedy Blades, Kylie Welker, Levi Haines, Zahid Valencia, Trent Hidlay, and Kyle Snyder.

Twenty finalists qualified through winning their respective weight classes at the US Open in April 2026: Katie Gomez, Cristelle Rodriguez, Everest Leydecker, Amanda Martinez, Luke Lilledahl, Abigail Nette, Marcus Blaze, Adaugo Nwachukwu, Kayla Miracle, Bo Bassett, Bella Mir, Ridge Lovett, Alexandria Glaude, James Green, Dymond Guilford, Chance Marsteller, Kyle Dake, Michael Macchiavello, Stephen Buchanan, and Wyatt Hendrickson.

The remaining twelve finalists qualified through winning their respective weight classes at the 2026 World Team Trials tournament in May 2026: Morgan Turner, Elena Ivaldi, Areana Villaescusa, Alexis Janiak, Macey Kilty, Jennifer Page, Amit Elor, Spencer Lee, Jax Forrest, Zain Retherford, David Carr, and Mason Parris.

Amit Elor won her 72 kg series by forfeit after Alexandria Glaude withdrew from the event due to injury.

The 92 kg series between Trent Hidlay and Michael Macchiavello took place at Freedom High School on June 13, 2026.

Prior to the main card, True-Third Place matches in ten weight classes will occur. An additional ten members of Team USA will be decided in single-match bouts between these 2nd and 3rd-place runners-up from the 2026 World Team Trials tournament: Felicity Taylor, Samara Chavez, Alex Hedrick, Amani Jones, Austin DeSanto, Ben Davino, Emma Bruntil, Reese Larramendy, Joseph McKenna, Beau Bartlett, Latifah McBryde, Jasmine Robinson, Landon Robideau, Caleb Henson, Evan Wick, Patrick Kennedy, Parker Keckeisen, Aeoden Sinclair, Dustin Plott, and Seth Shumate.

Real Woods withdrew from the event on June 15, 2026 due to injury, and requested his 65 kg series with Bo Bassett be delayed. Kylie Welker also requested her 76 kg series with Dymond Guilford be delayed. Kennedy Blades also requested her 68 kg series with Bella Mir be delayed.

== Match card ==
Match 3 (FloSports)
Weight class				Method	Round	Time	Notes
62 kg	(United States) Adaugo Nwachukwu	def.	(United States) Macey Kilty	Decision (4-3)	2	3:00
50 kg	(United States) Morgan Turner	def.	(United States) Katie Gomez	Decision (8-2)	2	3:00
86 kg	(United States) Kyle Dake	def.	(United States) Zahid Valencia	Decision (4-0)	2	3:00
61 kg	(United States) Marcus Blaze	def.	(United States) Jax Forrest	Decision (5-2)	2	3:00
97 kg	(United States) Kyle Snyder	def.	(United States) Stephen Buchanan	Decision (9-3)	2	3:00
74 kg	(United States) James Green	def.	(United States) David Carr	Decision (4-1)	2	3:00
Match 2 (FloSports)
Weight class				Method	Round	Time	Notes
76 kg	(United States) Kylie Welker	vs.	(United States) Dymond Guilford				(Note: Delayed to future date)
68 kg	(United States) Kennedy Blades	vs.	(United States) Bella Mir				(Note: Delayed to future date)
57 kg	(United States) Helen Maroulis	def.	(United States) Amanda Martinez	Decision (8-0)	2	3:00
62 kg	(United States) Macey Kilty	def.	(United States) Adaugo Nwachukwu	4-0	2	3:00
50 kg	(United States) Katie Gomez	def.	(United States) Morgan Turner	Decision (3-2)	2	3:00
72 kg	(United States) Amit Elor	def.	(United States) Alexandria Glaude	Forfeit
53 kg	(United States) Cristelle Rodriguez	vs.	(United States) Elena Ivaldi	Decision (9-0)	2	3:00
59 kg	(United States) Abigail Nette	def.	(United States) Alexis Janiak	Technical Fall (10-0)	1	2:05
55 kg	(United States) Everest Leydecker	def.	(United States) Areana Villaescusa	Decision (3-1)	2	3:00
65 kg	(United States) Kayla Miracle	def.	(United States) Jennifer Page	Decision (5-1)	2	3:00
65 kg	(United States) Bo Bassett	def.	(United States) Real Woods	Decision (9-5)	2	3:00
86 kg	(United States) Kyle Dake	def.	(United States) Zahid Valencia	Decision (4-1)	2	3:00
57 kg	(United States) Spencer Lee	def.	(United States) Luke Lilledahl	Decision (8-4)	2	3:00
61 kg	(United States) Jax Forrest	def.	(United States) Marcus Blaze	Decision (6-1)	2	3:00
97 kg	(United States) Stephen Buchanan	def.	(United States) Kyle Snyder	Decision (5-5)	2	3:00
74 kg	(United States) David Carr	def.	(United States) James Green	Decision (6-5)	2	3:00
79 kg	(United States) Levi Haines	def.	(United States) Chance Marsteller	Decision (6-5)	2	3:00
70 kg	(United States) Zain Retherford	def.	(United States) Ridge Lovett	Decision (8-2)	2	3:00
125 kg	(United States) Wyatt Hendrickson	def.	(United States) Mason Parris	Decision (7-1)	2	3:00
92 kg	(United States) Trent Hidlay	def.	(United States) Michael Macchiavello	Decision (8–3)	2	3:00	(Note: Match held at Freedom High School on June 13, 2026)
Match 1 (FloSports)
Weight class				Method	Round	Time	Notes
76 kg	(United States) Kylie Welker	vs.	(United States) Dymond Guilford				(Note: Delayed to future date)
68 kg	(United States) Kennedy Blades	vs.	(United States) Bella Mir				(Note: Delayed to future date)
57 kg	(United States) Helen Maroulis	def.	(United States) Amanda Martinez	Decision (8-1)	2	3:00
62 kg	(United States) Adaugo Nwachukwu	def.	(United States) Macey Kilty	Fall	1	3:00
50 kg	(United States) Morgan Turner	def.	(United States) Katie Gomez	Decision (7-2)	2	3:00
72 kg	(United States) Amit Elor	def.	(United States) Alexandria Glaude	Forfeit
53 kg	(United States) Cristelle Rodriguez	def.	(United States) Elena Ivaldi	Technical Fall (10-0)	2	2:07
59 kg	(United States) Abigail Nette	def.	(United States) Alexis Janiak	Fall	1	1:41
55 kg	(United States) Everest Leydecker	def.	(United States) Areana Villaescusa	Decision (2-1)	2	3:00
65 kg	(United States) Kayla Miracle	def.	(United States) Jennifer Page	Decision (7-2)	2	3:00
65 kg	(United States) Bo Bassett	def.	(United States) Real Woods	Decision (8-4)	2	3:00
86 kg	(United States) Zahid Valencia	def.	(United States) Kyle Dake	Decision (3-2)	2	3:00
57 kg	(United States) Spencer Lee	def.	(United States) Luke Lilledahl	Decision (7-1)	2	3:00
61 kg	(United States) Marcus Blaze	def.	(United States) Jax Forrest	Decision (2-2)	2	3:00
97 kg	(United States) Kyle Snyder	def.	(United States) Stephen Buchanan	Decision (5-2)	2	3:00
74 kg	(United States) James Green	def.	(United States) David Carr	Decision (6-3)	2	3:00
79 kg	(United States) Levi Haines	def.	(United States) Chance Marsteller	Decision (6-1)	2	3:00
70 kg	(United States) Zain Retherford	def.	(United States) Ridge Lovett	Decision (2-1)	2	3:00
125 kg	(United States) Wyatt Hendrickson	def.	(United States) Mason Parris	Decision (9-5)	2	3:00
92 kg	(United States) Trent Hidlay	def.	(United States) Michael Macchiavello	Decision (2–1)	2	3:00	(Note: Match held at Freedom High School on June 13, 2026)
True-Third Place (FloSports)
Weight class				Method	Round	Time	Notes
68 kg	(United States) Latifah McBryde	def.	(United States) Jasmine Robinson	Decision (8-2)	2	3:00
65 kg	(United States) Reese Larramendy	def.	(United States) Emma Bruntil	Forfeit
57 kg	(United States) Alex Hedrick	def.	(United States) Amani Jones	Decision (5-3)	2	3:00
50 kg	(United States) Samara Chavez	def.	(United States) Felicity Taylor	Technical Fall (10-0)	1	1:44
92 kg	(United States) Dustin Plott	def.	(United States) Seth Shumate	Technical Fall (10-0)	1	2:25
86 kg	(United States) Parker Keckeisen	def.	(United States) Aeoden Sinclair	Decision (5-5)	2	3:00
79 kg	(United States) Evan Wick	def.	(United States) Patrick Kennedy	Decision (8-4)	2	3:00
70 kg	(United States) Landon Robideau	def.	(United States) Caleb Henson	Forfeit
65 kg	(United States) Beau Bartlett	def.	(United States) Joseph McKenna	Forfeit
61 kg	(United States) Austin DeSanto	def.	(United States) Ben Davino	Forfeit
