= Luke Lilledahl =

American wrestler (born 2005)

Personal information
- Full name: Luke Joseph Lilledahl
- Born: August 1, 2005 (age 20) Weldon Spring, Missouri, U.S.
- Weight: 57 kg (126 lb)

Sport
- Country: United States
- Sport: Wrestling
- Events: Freestyle and Folkstyle
- Club: Nittany Lion Wrestling Club
- Coached by: Cael Sanderson
Medal record
Men's freestyle wrestling
Representing the United States
Grand Prix
| Gold medal – first place | 2025 Budapest | 57 kg |
| Bronze medal – third place | 2023 New York City | 57 kg |
US National Championships
| Gold medal – first place | 2026 Las Vegas | 57 kg |
| Gold medal – first place | 2025 Las Vegas | 57 kg |
World U23 Championships
| Gold medal – first place | 2025 Novi Sad | 57 kg |
U20 World Championships
| Gold medal – first place | 2024 Pontevedra | 57 kg |
| Silver medal – second place | 2023 Amman | 57 kg |
U17 World Championships
| Gold medal – first place | 2022 Rome | 51 kg |
| Silver medal – second place | 2021 Budapest | 48 kg |
U23 Pan American Championships
| Gold medal – first place | 2025 Queretaro | 57 kg |
U20 Pan American Championships
| Gold medal – first place | 2024 Lima | 57 kg |
| Gold medal – first place | 2023 Santiago | 57 kg |
Men's collegiate wrestling
Representing the Penn State Nittany Lions
NCAA Division I Championships
| Gold medal – first place | 2026 Cleveland | 125 lb |
| Bronze medal – third place | 2025 Philadelphia | 125 lb |
Big Ten Championships
| Gold medal – first place | 2026 State College | 125 lb |
| Gold medal – first place | 2025 Evanston | 125 lb |

Luke Joseph Lilledahl (born August 1, 2005) is an American freestyle and folkstyle wrestler who competes at 57 kilograms and 125 pounds. In freestyle, he was the 2025 U23 World champion, the 2024 U20 World champion and the 2022 U17 World champion.

Competing out of the Pennsylvania State University, Lilledahl was an undefeated NCAA Division I National champion, as well as a Big Ten Conference champion during the 2025–2026 season.

== Career ==
=== High school ===
==== 2020–2024 ====
Born and raised in Missouri, Lilledahl went on to attend Christian Brothers College High School in St. Louis, where he became a 2021 MSHSAA state champion as a freshman. After becoming a U17 World medalist, he moved to Wyoming Seminary, where he graduated in 2024. During his time in high school in Pennsylvania, he became a three-time Pennsylvania Independent Schools Wrestling Tournament champion, a two-time National Prep champion, a U17 World champion and a U20 World medalist. He committed to wrestle at Pennsylvania State University in April 2023.

Still in high school, Lilledahl placed third at the 2023 Bill Farrell Memorial International in his senior level debut in November, only falling to three-time NCAA champion Spencer Lee.

A month later, he went on to qualify for the 2024 US Olympic Trials, with a fifth-place finish at the US National Championships in December 2023. In April 2024, Lilledahl went 2–2 at the US Olympic Team Trials.

=== Pennsylvania State University ===
==== 2024–2025 ====
After winning the U20 US World Team Trials in June, Lilledahl went on to become the U20 World champion at 57 kilograms in September 2024 before his freshman season at Penn State.

Competing as a true freshman at 125 pounds, Lilledahl claimed the Black Knight Open title and went 13–2 in dual action for the Nittany Lions during regular season. He then claimed the Big Ten Conference title, before securing a third-place finish and All-American status at the NCAA National tournament.

Back to freestyle, Lilledahl claimed the gold medal at the U23 Pan American Championships in April 2025. Weeks later, he became the US National champion at 57 kilograms, claiming four wins over fellow Americans. As the winner of the tournament, Lilledahl qualified for Final X, where he faced returning Olympic finalist Spencer Lee for the US World Team spot in June. He lost two bouts in a row to claim runner-up honors.

Lilledahl won the 2026 US Open at 57 kilograms, qualifying him for Final X in June.

== Freestyle record ==
Senior Freestyle Matches
| Res. | Record | Opponent | Score | Date | Event | Location |
2026 US World Team Trials (silver) at 57 kg
| Loss | 27–10 | (United States) Spencer Lee | 4–8 | June 19, 2026 | 2026 Final X | (United States) Newark, New Jersey |
| Loss | 27–9 | (United States) Spencer Lee | 1–7 | June 19, 2026 | 2026 Final X | (United States) Newark, New Jersey |
2026 US Open (gold) at 57 kg
| Win | 27–8 | (United States) Spencer Lee | 5–4 | April 24–25, 2026 | 2026 US Open National Championships | (United States) Las Vegas, Nevada |
| Win | 26–8 | (United States) Liam Cronin | TF 10–0 | April 24–25, 2026 | 2026 US Open National Championships | (United States) Las Vegas, Nevada |
| Win | 25–8 | (United States) Antonio Mills | 3–1 | April 24–25, 2026 | 2026 US Open National Championships | (United States) Las Vegas, Nevada |
| Win | 24–8 | (United States) Natan A Cantu | TF 12–1 | April 24–25, 2026 | 2026 US Open National Championships | (United States) Las Vegas, Nevada |
2025 U23 World Championships (gold) at 57 kg
| Win | 23–8 | (Japan) Yuta Kikuchi | 4–0 | October 25–26, 2025 | 2025 U23 World Championships | Novi Sad, Serbia |
| Win | 22–8 | Aiandai Ondar | 7–1 | October 25–26, 2025 | 2025 U23 World Championships | Novi Sad, Serbia |
| Win | 21–8 | (Iran) Milad Valizadeh | 11–5 | October 25–26, 2025 | 2025 U23 World Championships | Novi Sad, Serbia |
| Win | 20–8 | (China) Liao Honghang | TF 10–0 | October 25–26, 2025 | 2025 U23 World Championships | Novi Sad, Serbia |
| Loss | 19–8 | (Russia) Musa Mekhtikhanov | 5–8 | Jul 21, 2025 | PWL 9 | Budapest, Hungary |
2025 Polyák Imre & Varga János Memorial Tournament (gold) 57 kg
| Win | 19–7 | (Azerbaijan) Islam Bazarganov | 3–1 | Jul 17-20, 2025 | 2025 Polyák Imre & Varga János Memorial Tournament | Budapest, Hungary |
| Win | 18–7 | (India) Rahul Rahul | 7–6 | Jul 17-20, 2025 | 2025 Polyák Imre & Varga János Memorial Tournament | Budapest, Hungary |
| Win | 17–7 | (Germany) Niklas Stechele | 4–2 | Jul 17-20, 2025 | 2025 Polyák Imre & Varga János Memorial Tournament | Budapest, Hungary |
2025 US World Team Trials (silver) at 57 kg
| Loss | 16–7 | (United States) Spencer Lee | 0–6 | June 14, 2025 | 2025 Final X | (United States) Newark, New Jersey |
| Loss | 16–6 | (United States) Spencer Lee | 2–7 | June 14, 2025 | 2025 Final X | (United States) Newark, New Jersey |
2025 US Open (gold) at 57 kg
| Win | 16–5 | (United States) Liam Cronin | TF 10–0 | April 25–26, 2025 | 2025 US Open National Championships | (United States) Las Vegas, Nevada |
| Win | 15–5 | (United States) Nico Provo | 10–4 | April 25–26, 2025 | 2025 US Open National Championships | (United States) Las Vegas, Nevada |
| Win | 14–5 | (United States) Brendan McCrone | TF 10–0 | April 25–26, 2025 | 2025 US Open National Championships | (United States) Las Vegas, Nevada |
| Win | 13–5 | (United States) Shamar Baines | TF 10–0 | April 25–26, 2025 | 2025 US Open National Championships | (United States) Las Vegas, Nevada |
2025 U23 Pan American Championships (gold) at 57 kg
| Win | —N/a | (Canada) Treye Trotman | FF | April 12, 2025 | 2025 U23 Pan American Championships | Queretaro, Mexico |
| Win | 12–5 | (Venezuela) Jose Falcon | TF 10–0 | April 12, 2025 | 2025 U23 Pan American Championships | Queretaro, Mexico |
| Win | 11–5 | (Cuba) Danaury Rivalta | TF 11–0 | April 12, 2025 | 2025 U23 Pan American Championships | Queretaro, Mexico |
| Win | 10–5 | (Mexico) Ricardo Peña | TF 10–0 | April 12, 2025 | 2025 U23 Pan American Championships | Queretaro, Mexico |
2024 US Olympic Team Trials DNP at 57 kg
| Loss | 9–5 | (United States) Marcus Blaze | 1–5 | April 19–20, 2024 | 2024 US Olympic Team Trials | (United States) State College, Pennsylvania |
| Win | 9–4 | (United States) Liam Cronin | 2–2 | April 19–20, 2024 | 2024 US Olympic Team Trials | (United States) State College, Pennsylvania |
| Loss | 8–4 | (United States) Zane Richards | 3–5 | April 19–20, 2024 | 2024 US Olympic Team Trials | (United States) State College, Pennsylvania |
| Win | 8–3 | (United States) Daniel DeShazer | 3–2 | April 19–20, 2024 | 2024 US Olympic Team Trials | (United States) State College, Pennsylvania |
2023 US Nationals 5th at 57 kg
| Win | 7–3 | (United States) Josh Rodriguez | 4–2 | December 15–17, 2023 | 2023 US National Championships | (United States) Fort Worth, Texas |
| Loss | 6–3 | (United States) Daniel DeShazer | 1–4 | December 15–17, 2023 | 2023 US National Championships | (United States) Fort Worth, Texas |
| Loss | 6–2 | (United States) Nico Megaludis | TF 0–10 | December 15–17, 2023 | 2023 US National Championships | (United States) Fort Worth, Texas |
| Win | 6–1 | (United States) Brandon Courtney | 6–2 | December 15–17, 2023 | 2023 US National Championships | (United States) Fort Worth, Texas |
| Win | 5–1 | (United States) Terrace Andrews | TF 10–0 | December 15–17, 2023 | 2023 US National Championships | (United States) Fort Worth, Texas |
2023 Bill Farrell Memorial International (bronze) at 57 kg
| Win | 4–1 | (Pakistan) Muhammad Bilal | 5–0 | November 17–18, 2023 | 2023 Bill Farrell Memorial International | (United States) New York City, New York |
| Win | 3–1 | (United States) Daniel DeShazer | 2–1 | November 17–18, 2023 | 2023 Bill Farrell Memorial International | (United States) New York City, New York |
| Loss | 2–1 | (United States) Spencer Lee | TF 0–11 | November 17–18, 2023 | 2023 Bill Farrell Memorial International | (United States) New York City, New York |
| Win | 2–0 | (United States) Killian Delaney | 11–4 | November 17–18, 2023 | 2023 Bill Farrell Memorial International | (United States) New York City, New York |
| Win | 1–0 | (Puerto Rico) Jacob Moran | TF 10–0 | November 17–18, 2023 | 2023 Bill Farrell Memorial International | (United States) New York City, New York |
