= 2025 U23 Pan American Wrestling Championships =

Wrestling event in Queretaro, Mexico

- Host city: Querétaro, Mexico
- Dates: 10-12 April 2025

Champions
- Freestyle: United States
- Greco-Roman: Mexico
- Women: United States

The 2025 U23 Pan American Wrestling Championships was the 2nd edition of U23 Pan American Wrestling Championships of combined events, and it was held from 10 to 12 April in Querétaro, Mexico.

== Medal summary ==
=== Men's freestyle ===
Event	Gold	Silver	Bronze
57 kg	Luke Lilledahl; United States	Treye Trotman; Canada	Danaury Rivalta Bernaldez; Cuba
57 kg	Luke Lilledahl; United States	Treye Trotman; Canada	Enrique Herrera; Peru
61 kg	Zan Fugitt; United States	Derick Martinez Mateo; Puerto Rico	Blayne Helou; Canada
65 kg	Christopher Composto; United States	Juset Martinez Deprestre; Cuba	Jose Benites Vasquez; Peru
65 kg	Christopher Composto; United States	Juset Martinez Deprestre; Cuba	Victor Parra Roman; Venezuela
70 kg	John Wiley; United States	Cole Coghill; Canada	Gabriel Sanchez Zepeda; Mexico
74 kg	Orislandy Perdomo Brooks; Cuba	Rafael Garcia Morales; Puerto Rico	Tyler Tracy; Jamaica
74 kg	Orislandy Perdomo Brooks; Cuba	Rafael Garcia Morales; Puerto Rico	Hunter Garvin; United States
79 kg	Levi Haines; United States	Jackson Glasgow; Canada	Alan Vera Gomez; Mexico
86 kg	Geannis Garzon Tamayo; Cuba	Steven Rodriguez Torreyes; Venezuela	Jaxon Smith; United States
86 kg	Geannis Garzon Tamayo; Cuba	Steven Rodriguez Torreyes; Venezuela	Ricardo Salinas; Puerto Rico
92 kg	Connor Mirasola; United States	Joseph De Maio; Canada	Miguel Lavielle Ramirez; Mexico
97 kg	Massoma Endene; United States	Juan Iturriza Ruiz; Mexico	Omogbai Asekomhe; Canada
97 kg	Massoma Endene; United States	Juan Iturriza Ruiz; Mexico	Darrell Lee Galloso; Cuba
125 kg	Lucas Stoddard; United States	Roger Li; Canada	Victor Perez Genere; Dominican Republic
125 kg	Lucas Stoddard; United States	Roger Li; Canada	Ethan Vergara; Puerto Rico

=== Men's Greco-Roman ===
Event	Gold	Silver	Bronze
55 kg	Isaac Marin Mata; Mexico	Jose Castañeda; Colombia	Davian Guanajuato; United States
60 kg	Diego Terriquez Ibarra; Mexico	Patrick Rodriguez Quinto; Ecuador	Yorkis Carvajal Lerbours; Dominican Republic
60 kg	Diego Terriquez Ibarra; Mexico	Patrick Rodriguez Quinto; Ecuador	Dieymer Rosal Amundaray; Venezuela
63 kg	Angel Segura Tellez; Mexico	Jonathan Gurule; United States	Sebastian Bustamante Mejias; Chile
67 kg	Yonat Veliz Martinez; Cuba	Richard Fedalen; United States	Jonathan Bermudez Castillo; Venezuela
67 kg	Yonat Veliz Martinez; Cuba	Richard Fedalen; United States	Ronaldo Sánchez; Colombia
72 kg	Jorge Gomez Garcia; Mexico	Clay Radenz; United States	Arnoldo Proboste; Argentina
77 kg	Hunter Garvin; United States	Joenni Gomez Taquechel; Cuba	Nilson Sinisterra; Colombia
77 kg	Hunter Garvin; United States	Joenni Gomez Taquechel; Cuba	Dario Cubas Castillo; Peru
82 kg	Adrian Artsisheuskiy; United States	Omar Mendoza De Ramon; Mexico	Maximo Cabrera; Argentina
87 kg	Brian Ruiz Marin; Venezuela	Kauan Ferreira Gomes; Brazil	Diego Macias Torres; Mexico
87 kg	Brian Ruiz Marin; Venezuela	Kauan Ferreira Gomes; Brazil	Cristian Pelegrino Estalella; Cuba
97 kg	Juan Diaz Blanco; Venezuela	Dorian Trejo Olguin; Mexico	Gabriel Lee Skinner; Panama
97 kg	Juan Diaz Blanco; Venezuela	Dorian Trejo Olguin; Mexico	Ricardo Gomez; Argentina
130 kg	Keith Miley Jr; United States	Luis Talavera Luna; Venezuela	Juan Herrera De La Rosa; Mexico
130 kg	Keith Miley Jr; United States	Luis Talavera Luna; Venezuela	Jose Nunez Encarnacion; Dominican Republic

=== Women ===
Event	Gold	Silver	Bronze
50 kg	Greili Bencosme Carvajal; Cuba	Nohalis Loyo Jimenez; Venezuela	Ava Bayless; United States
50 kg	Greili Bencosme Carvajal; Cuba	Nohalis Loyo Jimenez; Venezuela	Antuaneth Casusol Casas; Peru
53 kg	Shammilka Miranda Diaz; Puerto Rico	Serena Di Benedetto; Canada	Sydney Petzinger; United States
53 kg	Shammilka Miranda Diaz; Puerto Rico	Serena Di Benedetto; Canada	Mariana Rojas Diaz; Venezuela
55 kg	Montana Delawder; United States	Josefina Ramirez Duarte; Mexico	Sophia Bechard; Canada
57 kg	Yaynelis Sanz Verdecia; Cuba	Gabriela Cross; Canada	Camila Amarilla; Argentina
57 kg	Yaynelis Sanz Verdecia; Cuba	Gabriela Cross; Canada	Bertha Rojas Chavez; Mexico
59 kg	Bella Williams; United States	Olivia Lichti; Canada	Karla Ramos Espinosa; Mexico
62 kg	Astrid Montero Chirinos; Venezuela	Katerina Lange; United States	Melanie Jimenez Villalba; Mexico
62 kg	Astrid Montero Chirinos; Venezuela	Katerina Lange; United States	Carina Giangeruso; Puerto Rico
65 kg	Nina Makem; United States	Angelina Ellis Toddington; Canada	Elide Castanon Buendia; Mexico
68 kg	Brooklyn Hays; United States	Brenda Sterling Martinez; Cuba	Debanhi Tapia Garcia; Mexico
68 kg	Brooklyn Hays; United States	Brenda Sterling Martinez; Cuba	Thais Tertuliano Sales; Brazil
72 kg	Lene McCrackin; Canada	Elleni Johnson; United States	Michelle Olea Ruiz; Mexico
76 kg	María Ceballos; Colombia	Kalila Shrive; United States	Edna Jimenez Villalba; Mexico
76 kg	María Ceballos; Colombia	Kalila Shrive; United States	Vianne Rouleau; Canada

== Medal table ==
* Host nation (Mexico)

Rank	Nation	Gold	Silver	Bronze	Total
1	United States	15	6	5	26
2	Cuba	5	3	3	11
3	Mexico*	4	4	12	20
4	Venezuela	3	3	4	10
5	Canada	1	9	4	14
6	Puerto Rico	1	2	3	6
7	Colombia	1	1	2	4
8	Brazil	0	1	1	2
9	Ecuador	0	1	0	1
10	Argentina	0	0	4	4
10	Peru	0	0	4	4
12	Dominican Republic	0	0	3	3
13	Chile	0	0	1	1
13	Jamaica	0	0	1	1
13	Panama	0	0	1	1
Totals (15 entries)		30	30	48	108

== Team ranking ==
Rank	Men's freestyle		Men's Greco-Roman		Women's freestyle	
Rank	Team	Points	Team	Points	Team	Points
1	United States	230	Mexico	182	United States	192
2	Canada	152	United States	178	Canada	161
3	Cuba	100	Venezuela	110	Mexico	137
4	Puerto Rico	98	Cuba	78	Cuba	84
5	Mexico	95	Dominican Republic	60	Venezuela	82
6	Venezuela	63	Colombia	58	Puerto Rico	71
7	Dominican Republic	39	Argentina	57	Brazil	51
8	Guatemala	38	Brazil	46	Ecuador	42
9	Peru	30	Panama	31	Colombia	35
10	Colombia	26	Ecuador	30	Peru	31
11	Brazil	24	Peru	29	Chile	20
12	Panama	24	Chile	27	Panama	20
13	Jamaica	19	Barbados	16	Argentina	15
14	Argentina	16	Guatemala	10	Paraguay	12
15	Ecuador	12	Paraguay	8	Guatemala	8
16	Honduras	9	Puerto Rico	4		
17	Barbados	9	Honduras	4		
18	Costa Rica	4				
19	Paraguay	4				
20	Chile	2				
21	El Salvador	0				
