= 2025 U23 World Wrestling Championships – Men's freestyle 79 kg =

Wrestling competitions

Men's freestyle 79 kg at the 2025 U23 World Championships
- Venue: SPC Vojvodina
- Dates: 25–26 October
- Competitors: 22 from 20 nations

Medalists
gold medal	Levi Haines	United States
silver medal	Metehan Yaprak	Turkey
bronze medal	Geannis Garzón	Cuba
bronze medal	Mehdi Yousefi	Iran

The men's freestyle 79 kilograms is a competition featured at the 2025 U23 World Wrestling Championships, and was held in Novi Sad, Serbia on 25 and 26 October 2025.

This freestyle wrestling competition consists of a single-elimination tournament, with a repechage used to determine the winner of two bronze medals. The two finalists face off for gold and silver medals. Each wrestler who loses to one of the two finalists moves into the repechage, culminating in a pair of bronze medal matches featuring the semifinal losers each facing the remaining repechage opponent from their half of the bracket.

== Results ==
Legend

- F — Won by fall

=== Final ===
Final
Metehan Yaprak (TUR)	1
Levi Haines (USA)	11

=== Top half ===
Round of 32
Andrija Ivanović (SRB)	0
Metehan Yaprak (TUR)	10
Umar Mavlaev (SUI)	1
Farid Jabbarov (AZE)	3
Nikita Dmitrijevs Mayeuski (UWW)	3^{F}
Connor Church (CAN)	2

Round of 16
Hayk Papikyan (ARM)	5
Vitalii Malenkov (UKR)	0
Metehan Yaprak (TUR)	10
Geannis Garzón (CUB)	8
Yerkhan Abil (KAZ)	5
Farid Jabbarov (AZE)	0
Nikita Dmitrijevs Mayeuski (UWW)	6
Ion Laurențiu Marcu (MDA)	4

Quarterfinals
Hayk Papikyan (ARM)	1
Metehan Yaprak (TUR)	3
Yerkhan Abil (KAZ)	3
Nikita Dmitrijevs Mayeuski (UWW)	7

Semifinals
Metehan Yaprak (TUR)	5
Nikita Dmitrijevs Mayeuski (UWW)	2

=== Bottom half ===
Round of 32
Mateusz Pędzicki (POL)	8^{F}
Bayalige (CHN)	2
Luka Chkhitunidze (GEO)	10
Chander Mohan (IND)	0
Yael Pérez (MEX)	0
Gregor Eigenbrodt (GER)	11

Round of 16
Davud Daudov (UWW)	2^{F}
Mateusz Pędzicki (POL)	0
Luka Chkhitunidze (GEO)	7
Subaru Takahara (JPN)	4
Aykan Seid (BUL)	3
Gregor Eigenbrodt (GER)	2
Levi Haines (USA)	7
Mehdi Yousefi (IRI)	0

Quarterfinals
Davud Daudov (UWW)	10
Luka Chkhitunidze (GEO)	0
Aykan Seid (BUL)	0
Levi Haines (USA)	10

Semifinals
Davud Daudov (UWW)	4
Levi Haines (USA)	11

=== Repechage ===
Repechage round 1
Andrija Ivanović (SRB)	2
Geannis Garzón (CUB)	11

Repechage round 2
Geannis Garzón (CUB)	3
Hayk Papikyan (ARM)	2
Mehdi Yousefi (IRI)	11^{F}
Aykan Seid (BUL)	0

Bronze medals
Geannis Garzón (CUB)	4
Nikita Dmitrijevs Mayeuski (UWW)	0
Mehdi Yousefi (IRI)	13
Davud Daudov (UWW)	3

== Final standing ==
Rank	Athlete
1st place, gold medalist(s)	Levi Haines (USA)
2nd place, silver medalist(s)	Metehan Yaprak (TUR)
3rd place, bronze medalist(s)	Geannis Garzón (CUB)
3rd place, bronze medalist(s)	Mehdi Yousefi (IRI)
5	Nikita Dmitrijevs Mayeuski (UWW)
5	Davud Daudov (UWW)
7	Luka Chkhitunidze (GEO)
8	Mateusz Pędzicki (POL)
9	Gregor Eigenbrodt (GER)
10	Hayk Papikyan (ARM)
11	Yerkhan Abil (KAZ)
12	Farid Jabbarov (AZE)
13	Aykan Seid (BUL)
14	Ion Laurențiu Marcu (MDA)
15	Subaru Takahara (JPN)
16	Andrija Ivanović (SRB)
17	Umar Mavlaev (SUI)
18	Connor Church (CAN)
19	Bayalige (CHN)
20	Vitalii Malenkov (UKR)
21	Chander Mohan (IND)
22	Yael Pérez (MEX)
