= 2023 World Cadet Wrestling Championships – Men's freestyle =

The men's freestyle competitions at the 2023 World Cadet Wrestling Championships were held in Istanbul, Turkey, between 4 and 6 August 2023.

== Men's freestyle ==
=== Men's freestyle 45 kg ===
5 August

Legend

- F — Won by fall

Round of 16
Jafar Jafarov (AZE)	8
Ebubekir Gür (TUR)	9
Nurmukhamed Turdaly (KAZ)	0
Gor Buniatyan (ARM)	7
Atsuki Matsuura (JPN)	8
Buyanjargal Batmunkh (MGL)	2
Daniel Negru (MDA)	1
Ahora Khateri (IRI)	12
Bobojon Ibadullaev (UZB)	1
Agashirin Agisherinov (ANA)	11
Frederick Bachmann (PUR)	0
Ignacio Villasenor (USA)	6

Quarterfinals
Mate Tsinadze (GEO)	6
Ebubekir Gür (TUR)	10
Gor Buniatyan (ARM)	8
Atsuki Matsuura (JPN)	0
Ahora Khateri (IRI)	5
Agashirin Agisherinov (ANA)	0
Ignacio Villasenor (USA)	10
Dhanraj Shirke (IND)	0

Semifinals
Ebubekir Gür (TUR)	3
Gor Buniatyan (ARM)	4
Ahora Khateri (IRI)	5
Ignacio Villasenor (USA)	2

Final
Gor Buniatyan (ARM)	0
Ahora Khateri (IRI)	11

Repechage round 1
Atsuki Matsuura (JPN)	4
Nurmukhamed Turdaly (KAZ)	7
Daniel Negru (MDA)
Agashirin Agisherinov (ANA)	WO

Bronze medal match
Ebubekir Gür (TUR)	4^{F}
Nurmukhamed Turdaly (KAZ)	0
Ignacio Villasenor (USA)	3
Agashirin Agisherinov (ANA)	2

=== Men's freestyle 48 kg ===
4 August

Legend

- F — Won by fall

Round of 32
	Score	
Yamato Furusawa (JPN)	13-2	Efe Karataş (TUR)
Zakhidzhon Mirzaev (KGZ)	2-4	Ali Sultanov (ANA)
Paul Joseph Kenny (USA)	11-0	Oliwier Orzechowski (POL)
Lior Shmulko (ISR)	0-10	Rupesh (IND)

Round of 16
Enkhkhuslen Tushisbayar (MGL)	5^{F}
Yahor Mikhailau (ANA)	3
Yamato Furusawa (JPN)	4
Valentin Rusu (ROU)	0
Mihran Sloyan (ARM)	0
Ali Sultanov (ANA)	3
Gegi Oniani (GEO)	6
Joseph Bachmann (PUR)	9
Dominick Aoun (RSA)	4
Yeraly Zhetpissov (KAZ)	2^{F}
Paul Joseph Kenny (USA)	4
Azymberdi Ashyrgulyyev (TKM)	2
Sam Reza Sayar (IRI)	3
Rupesh (IND)	1
Abdumalik Jaloldinov (UZB)	8
Bashir Verdiyev (AZE)	5

Quarterfinals
Enkhkhuslen Tushisbayar (MGL)	1
Yamato Furusawa (JPN)	14
Ali Sultanov (ANA)	7
Joseph Bachmann (PUR)	14
Yeraly Zhetpissov (KAZ)	2
Paul Joseph Kenny (USA)	6^{F}
Sam Reza Sayar (IRI)	14
Abdumalik Jaloldinov (UZB)	4

Semifinals
Yamato Furusawa (JPN)	4
Joseph Bachmann (PUR)	2
Paul Joseph Kenny (USA)	8
Sam Reza Sayar (IRI)	8

Final
Yamato Furusawa (JPN)	1
Paul Joseph Kenny (USA)	1

Repechage round 1
Efe Karataş (TUR)	5
Valentin Rusu (ROU)	4^{F}
Oliwier Orzechowski (POL)	2
Azymberdi Ashyrgulyyev (TKM)	8^{F}

Repechage round 2
Enkhkhuslen Tushisbayar (MGL)	2
Valentin Rusu (ROU)	13
Yeraly Zhetpissov (KAZ)	3
Azymberdi Ashyrgulyyev (TKM)	8

Bronze medal match
Joseph Bachmann (PUR)	15
Valentin Rusu (ROU)	5
Sam Reza Sayar (IRI)	10
Azymberdi Ashyrgulyyev (TKM)	0

=== Men's freestyle 51 kg ===
5 August

Legend

- F — Won by fall

Round of 32
	Score	
Myanganbanzragch Tumentogtokh (MGL)	7-12	Kristian Cikel (AUT)

Round of 16
Amirmohammad Navazi (IRI)	11
Olzhas Zhanabayev (KAZ)	0
Kristian Cikel (AUT)	0
Nurdoolot Bekbolotov (KGZ)	5
Yamato Ogawa (JPN)	7
Sasha Petrosyan (ARM)	1
Mokbel Sahli (TUN)	2
Yandel Morales (PUR)	6
Kahraman Eski (TUR)	1
Sadriddin Hasanov (AZE)	4
Christian Aaron Castillo (USA)	4
Rohit (IND)	5
Giorgi Maisuradze (GEO)	10
Vladimir Ichizli (MDA)	0
Abbos Kuziev (UZB)	6
Usman Indirbaev (ANA)	10

Quarterfinals
Amirmohammad Navazi (IRI)	7
Nurdoolot Bekbolotov (KGZ)	0
Yamato Ogawa (JPN)	10
Yandel Morales (PUR)	0
Sadriddin Hasanov (AZE)	0
Rohit (IND)	4
Giorgi Maisuradze (GEO)	0
Usman Indirbaev (ANA)	10

Semifinals
Amirmohammad Navazi (IRI)	1
Yamato Ogawa (JPN)	4
Rohit (IND)	5
Usman Indirbaev (ANA)	2

Final
Yamato Ogawa (JPN)	9
Rohit (IND)	8

Repechage round 1
Yandel Morales (PUR)	0
Sasha Petrosyan (ARM)	12
Christian Aaron Castillo (USA)	6
Sadriddin Hasanov (AZE)	12

Bronze medal match
Amirmohammad Navazi (IRI)	1
Sasha Petrosyan (ARM)	2
Usman Indirbaev (ANA)	10^{F}
Sadriddin Hasanov (AZE)	2

=== Men's freestyle 55 kg ===
4 August

Legend

- F — Won by fall

Final

Final
Ankush (IND)	3
Marcus Glenn Blaze (USA)	4

Top half

Round of 32
Danoush Jowkar (GBR)	0
Ankush (IND)	7^{F}
Akhmad Musakhadzhiev (ANA)	10
Stefan Stojkov (MKD)	0
Jakub Grzegorz Kesy (POL)	0
Allan Oralbek (KAZ)	12
Hacı Zade (TUR)	9
Shohrukhbek Sapoev (UZB)	8
Aik Kazarian (GRE)	4
Abdelghani Aid (ALG)	0

Round of 16
Ariya Yoshida (JPN)	1
Ankush (IND)	10
Akhmad Musakhadzhiev (ANA)	6
Allan Oralbek (KAZ)	0
Naran Ulzii Barkhas (MGL)	5
Hacı Zade (TUR)	2
Aik Kazarian (GRE)	0
Arshak Lulukyan (GEO)	10

Quarterfinals
Ankush (IND)	4
Akhmad Musakhadzhiev (ANA)	1
Naran Ulzii Barkhas (MGL)	5
Arshak Lulukyan (GEO)	11

Semifinals
Ankush (IND)	10
Arshak Lulukyan (GEO)	0

Bottom half

Round of 32
Marcus Glenn Blaze (USA)	2
Amirreza Ali Teymorizad (IRI)	1
Victor Dragoman (MDA)	4^{F}
Derick Mateo (PUR)	0
Samvel Gevorgyan (ARM)	11
Ilya Kostsenich (ANA)	1
Jaeden Brown (NZL)	0
Aktilek Zholdoshbek Uulu (KGZ)	10
Inseong Bak (KOR)	2
Rohan du Plessis (RSA)	2

Round of 16
Azatberdi Ashyrgulyyev (TKM)	1
Marcus Glenn Blaze (USA)	12
Victor Dragoman (MDA)	0
Oubayda Itaev (FRA)	3
Samvel Gevorgyan (ARM)	4
Aktilek Zholdoshbek Uulu (KGZ)	1
Rohan du Plessis (RSA)	0
Ali Tural Aliyev (AZE)	12

Quarterfinals
Marcus Glenn Blaze (USA)	10
Oubayda Itaev (FRA)	0
Samvel Gevorgyan (ARM)	11
Ali Tural Aliyev (AZE)	7

Semifinals
Marcus Glenn Blaze (USA)	11
Samvel Gevorgyan (ARM)	0

Repechage round 1
Ariya Yoshida (JPN)
Danoush Jowkar (GBR)	WO
Azatberdi Ashyrgulyyev (TKM)	0
Amirreza Ali Teymorizad (IRI)	11

Repechage round 2
Danoush Jowkar (GBR)	0
Akhmad Musakhadzhiev (ANA)	12
Oubayda Itaev (FRA)	0
Amirreza Ali Teymorizad (IRI)	10

Bronze medal match
Arshak Lulukyan (GEO)	2
Akhmad Musakhadzhiev (ANA)	12
Samvel Gevorgyan (ARM)	4
Amirreza Ali Teymorizad (IRI)	4

=== Men's freestyle 60 kg ===
5 August

Legend

- F — Won by fall

Final

Final
Sajad Pirdayeh (IRI)	1
Akito Maehara (JPN)	4

Top half

Round of 32
Abdoullah Nakaev (FRA)	2
Tushar (IND)	7
Sajad Pirdayeh (IRI)	11
Daniel Gurbovič (CZE)	0
Jamal Abbasov (AZE)	6
Yeraly Zhenissov (KAZ)	0
Bekjan Ruslanov (TKM)	13^{F}
Tengiz Barbakadze (GEO)	2

Round of 16
Omurbek Asan Uulu (KGZ)	5
Tushar (IND)	2
Sajad Pirdayeh (IRI)	6
Yandro Omar Rivera (PUR)	0
Benjamin Davino (USA)	0
Jamal Abbasov (AZE)	5
Bekjan Ruslanov (TKM)	15
Vahid Samed Yılmaz (TUR)	9

Quarterfinals
Omurbek Asan Uulu (KGZ)	1
Sajad Pirdayeh (IRI)	2
Jamal Abbasov (AZE)	10
Bekjan Ruslanov (TKM)	0

Semifinals
Sajad Pirdayeh (IRI)	3
Jamal Abbasov (AZE)	2

Bottom half

Round of 32
Shamsiddin Jumaboev (UZB)	9
Zandanbat Batsaihan (MGL)	10
Nick Eckenberger (GER)	2
Adrian Sikora (POL)	1
Aren Hayrapetyan (ARM)	4
Yasin Bersanukaev (ANA)	9
Cristi Ceban (MDA)	0
Gabriel Zepeda (MEX)	5

Round of 16
Petrus van der Walt (RSA)	0
Zandanbat Batsaihan (MGL)	8
Nick Eckenberger (GER)	2
Bernardo Szilagyi (ROU)	2
Uladzislau Varabyou (ANA)	2
Yasin Bersanukaev (ANA)	13
Gabriel Zepeda (MEX)	2
Akito Maehara (JPN)	4

Quarterfinals
Zandanbat Batsaihan (MGL)	10
Bernardo Szilagyi (ROU)	0
Yasin Bersanukaev (ANA)	1
Akito Maehara (JPN)	2

Semifinals
Zandanbat Batsaihan (MGL)	0
Akito Maehara (JPN)	11

Repechage round 1
Daniel Gurbovič (CZE)	0
Yandro Omar Rivera (PUR)	11

Repechage round 2
Omurbek Asan Uulu (KGZ)
Yandro Omar Rivera (PUR)	WO
Gabriel Zepeda (MEX)	0
Yasin Bersanukaev (ANA)	10

Bronze medal match
Jamal Abbasov (AZE)	6
Yandro Omar Rivera (PUR)	0
Zandanbat Batsaihan (MGL)	5
Yasin Bersanukaev (ANA)	7

=== Men's freestyle 65 kg ===
4 August

Legend

- F — Won by fall

Final

Final
Magomed Alibakharchiev (ANA)	0
Sina Mahdi Khalili (IRI)	10

Top half

Round of 32
Remzi Temur (TUR)	2
Khizir Dasiyev (FRA)	10
Keyvan Gharehdaghi (JPN)	12
Erdal Shukri Galip (BUL)	1
Fares Diaa Elsawy (EGY)	0
Magomed Alibakharchiev (ANA)	10
Brock Mantanona (USA)	14
Almas Sabyr (KAZ)	6
Arslan Mamishov (TKM)	0
Zafarbek Kamolov (UZB)	10

Round of 16
Juyoung Kim (KOR)	0
Khizir Dasiyev (FRA)	12^{F}
Keyvan Gharehdaghi (JPN)	3
Magomed Alibakharchiev (ANA)	7^{F}
Ankh Erdene Altangerel (MGL)	5
Brock Mantanona (USA)	16
Zafarbek Kamolov (UZB)	7
Justin Raffin (SUI)	3

Quarterfinals
Khizir Dasiyev (FRA)	2
Magomed Alibakharchiev (ANA)	3
Brock Mantanona (USA)	13
Zafarbek Kamolov (UZB)	2

Semifinals
Magomed Alibakharchiev (ANA)	14
Brock Mantanona (USA)	2

Bottom half

Round of 32
Denis Kodakov Gil (ESP)	4
Lukas Brandl (CZE)	0
Manuel Wagin (GER)	10
Antoni Majchrzak (POL)	0
Sourabh (IND)	1
Nursadyk Nurdinov (KGZ)	8^{F}
Samuel Leon Sedlák (SVK)	0
Sina Mahdi Khalili (IRI)	11
Vladimir Azaryan (ARM)	10
Vasileios Kesidis (GRE)	0
Aliaksandr Kambayeu (ANA)	5
Mirzaagha Akhundov (AZE)	16

Round of 16
Zurab Abalaki (GEO)	11
Denis Kodakov Gil (ESP)	0
Manuel Wagin (GER)	5
Nursadyk Nurdinov (KGZ)	5
Sina Mahdi Khalili (IRI)	5
Vladimir Azaryan (ARM)	1
Mirzaagha Akhundov (AZE)	7
Catalin Spinu (MDA)	7

Quarterfinals
Zurab Abalaki (GEO)	3
Manuel Wagin (GER)	6
Sina Mahdi Khalili (IRI)	11
Mirzaagha Akhundov (AZE)	2

Semifinals
Manuel Wagin (GER)	2
Sina Mahdi Khalili (IRI)	8

Repechage round 1
Fares Diaa Elsawy (EGY)	0
Keyvan Gharehdaghi (JPN)	11
Samuel Leon Sedlák (SVK)	0
Vladimir Azaryan (ARM)	11

Repechage round 2
Keyvan Gharehdaghi (JPN)	0
Khizir Dasiyev (FRA)	10
Mirzaagha Akhundov (AZE)	5
Vladimir Azaryan (ARM)	16

Bronze medal match
Brock Mantanona (USA)	6
Khizir Dasiyev (FRA)	5
Manuel Wagin (GER)	13
Vladimir Azaryan (ARM)	13

=== Men's freestyle 71 kg ===
5 August

Legend

- F — Won by fall

Final

Final
Ladarion Lockett (USA)	4
Seyedabolfazl Hosseini (IRI)	1

Top half

Round of 32
Reuven Rabinsky (ISR)	2
Nikolai Tarassov (EST)	8^{F}
Raatbek Rakhat Uulu (KGZ)	1
Narender (IND)	8
Ladarion Lockett (USA)	10
Victor Ivan Rivera (PUR)	0
Nurdaulet Seilbekov (KAZ)	7
Ferhat Yiğit (TUR)	3

Round of 16
Narek Nikoghosyan (ARM)	4
Nikolai Tarassov (EST)	0
Narender (IND)	8
Stiliyan Dzhorov (BUL)	6
Felix Schmitt (GER)	0
Ladarion Lockett (USA)	10
Nurdaulet Seilbekov (KAZ)	9
Gracjan Matyjasek (POL)	0

Quarterfinals
Narek Nikoghosyan (ARM)	5
Narender (IND)	11
Ladarion Lockett (USA)	8
Nurdaulet Seilbekov (KAZ)	0

Semifinals
Narender (IND)	0
Ladarion Lockett (USA)	10

Bottom half

Round of 32
Mohamed Chibikh (ALG)	0
Alp Arslan Begenjov (TKM)	11
Nodar Tevzadze (GEO)	0
Tatsuki Kamiya (JPN)	10
Asadbek Fayzullaev (UZB)	0
Islam Kazharov (ANA)	11
Piotr Caradjov (MDA)	6
Bilguundalai Purevdagva (MGL)	8

Round of 16
Avraam Moustopoulos (GRE)	0
Alp Arslan Begenjov (TKM)	11
Tatsuki Kamiya (JPN)	0
Seyedabolfazl Hosseini (IRI)	10
Ondrej Kocmanek (CZE)	0
Islam Kazharov (ANA)	10
Bilguundalai Purevdagva (MGL)	0
Ismayil Rahimli (AZE)	10

Quarterfinals
Alp Arslan Begenjov (TKM)	2
Seyedabolfazl Hosseini (IRI)	7
Islam Kazharov (ANA)	4
Ismayil Rahimli (AZE)	0

Semifinals
Seyedabolfazl Hosseini (IRI)	11
Islam Kazharov (ANA)	1

Repechage round 1
Victor Ivan Rivera (PUR)	0
Felix Schmitt (GER)	6

Repechage round 2
Nurdaulet Seilbekov (KAZ)	7
Felix Schmitt (GER)	1
Tatsuki Kamiya (JPN)	4
Alp Arslan Begenjov (TKM)	7

Bronze medal match
Narender (IND)	1
Nurdaulet Seilbekov (KAZ)	1
Islam Kazharov (ANA)	5
Alp Arslan Begenjov (TKM)	1

=== Men's freestyle 80 kg ===
4 August

Legend

- F — Won by fall

Final

Final
Alexandru Bors (MDA)	0
Magomed Idrisov (ANA)	2

Top half

Round of 32
Hüseyin Kabaktaş (TUR)	7
Saurabh Yadav (IND)	9
Razmik Yepremyan (ARM)	10
Maksim Ryshkov (ANA)	0
Alexandru Bors (MDA)	4
Ádám Mizsei (HUN)	0

Round of 16
Askhab Khajiyev (KAZ)	1
Zackary Ryder (USA)	2
Saurabh Yadav (IND)	10
Vladislav Rjabtsev (EST)	0
Ismayil Asadli (AZE)	8^{F}
Razmik Yepremyan (ARM)	1
Alexandru Bors (MDA)	11
Daniel Simonian (ISR)	0

Quarterfinals
Zackary Ryder (USA)	5^{F}
Saurabh Yadav (IND)	0
Ismayil Asadli (AZE)	1
Alexandru Bors (MDA)	3

Semifinals
Zackary Ryder (USA)	1
Alexandru Bors (MDA)	4

Bottom half

Round of 32
Magomed Idrisov (ANA)	10
Nick Scherrer (SUI)	0
Theofilos Kesidis (GRE)	2
Dovletgeldi Myradov (TKM)	12
Bartlomiej Nowakowski (POL)	3
Konstantine Petriashvili (GEO)	10
Abolfazl Firouzjaei (IRI)	10
Grigor Chernikov (BUL)	0

Round of 16
Byambadorj Enkhbat (MGL)	0
Magomed Idrisov (ANA)	5
Dovletgeldi Myradov (TKM)	7
Mukhammadali Rakhimov (UZB)	4
Omer Memedi (MKD)	0
Konstantine Petriashvili (GEO)	11
Abolfazl Firouzjaei (IRI)	12
Natsura Okazawa (JPN)	2

Quarterfinals
Magomed Idrisov (ANA)	8
Dovletgeldi Myradov (TKM)	0
Konstantine Petriashvili (GEO)	10^{F}
Abolfazl Firouzjaei (IRI)	8

Semifinals
Magomed Idrisov (ANA)	5
Konstantine Petriashvili (GEO)	1

Repechage round 1
Daniel Simonian (ISR)	2
Ádám Mizsei (HUN)	13
Nick Scherrer (SUI)	1
Byambadorj Enkhbat (MGL)	5

Repechage round 2
Ádám Mizsei (HUN)	0
Ismayil Asadli (AZE)	2
Byambadorj Enkhbat (MGL)	3
Dovletgeldi Myradov (TKM)	7

Bronze medal match
Zackary Ryder (USA)	12^{F}
Ismayil Asadli (AZE)	2
Konstantine Petriashvili (GEO)	6
Dovletgeldi Myradov (TKM)	4

=== Men's freestyle 92 kg ===
5 August

Legend

- F — Won by fall

Final

Final
Eyyüp Çetin (TUR)	0
Sandro Kurashvili (GEO)	10

Top half

Round of 32
Nikolaos Karavanas (GRE)	8
Ilija Atanasov (MKD)	6
Alimirza Abdulkadirov (ANA)	1
Erwin Pluschnik (GER)	1

Round of 16
Varuzhan Hovhannisyan (ARM)	8
Balazs Lorincz (ROU)	2
Nikolaos Karavanas (GRE)	1
Vinay (IND)	8
Demuul Ariuntuya (MGL)	4
Erwin Pluschnik (GER)	4
Eyyüp Çetin (TUR)	4^{F}
Samir Dursunov (KAZ)	2

Quarterfinals
Varuzhan Hovhannisyan (ARM)	0
Vinay (IND)	7
Erwin Pluschnik (GER)	0
Eyyüp Çetin (TUR)	10

Semifinals
Vinay (IND)	0
Eyyüp Çetin (TUR)	10

Bottom half

Round of 32
Suleyman Musagulyyev (TKM)	0
Genki Hoki (JPN)	9
Aeoden Sinclair (USA)	4^{F}
Bence Veress (HUN)	0

Round of 16
Pieter Lafras Uys (NAM)	0
Aliaksei Kulakou (ANA)	12^{F}
Genki Hoki (JPN)	14
Said Pashayev (AZE)	3
Toohid Noory (IRI)	5
Aeoden Sinclair (USA)	3
Sandro Kurashvili (GEO)	14
Isomjon Islamov (UZB)	3

Quarterfinals
Aliaksei Kulakou (ANA)	4
Genki Hoki (JPN)	6
Toohid Noory (IRI)	0
Sandro Kurashvili (GEO)	11

Semifinals
Genki Hoki (JPN)	0
Sandro Kurashvili (GEO)	10

Repechage round 1
Erwin Pluschnik (GER)	0
Samir Dursunov (KAZ)	10
Isomjon Islamov (UZB)	1
Toohid Noory (IRI)	12

Bronze medal match
Vinay (IND)	1
Samir Dursunov (KAZ)	12
Genki Hoki (JPN)	2
Toohid Noory (IRI)	12

=== Men's freestyle 110 kg ===
4 August

Legend

- F — Won by fall

Round of 16
Balazs Csipkes (ROU)	6
Yaraslau Kokhan (ANA)	4
Marwan Ehab Mohamed (EGY)	0
Yedige Kassimbek (KAZ)	10
Abolfazl Nezhad (IRI)	3
Singh Jaspooran (IND)	1
Narantulga Darmaabazar (MGL)	0
Rakhman Malakhmedov (ANA)	10
Hosei Fujita (JPN)	1
Balint Fabian (HUN)	1
Sampson Stillwell (USA)	3
Henrik Haykyan (ARM)	13
Yusif Dursunov (AZE)	11
Eldorbek Khasanov (UZB)	0
Ruşen Arda Güler (TUR)	0
Aleksandre Abramishvili (GEO)	5

Quarterfinals
Balazs Csipkes (ROU)	0
Yedige Kassimbek (KAZ)	10
Abolfazl Nezhad (IRI)	2
Rakhman Malakhmedov (ANA)	12
Hosei Fujita (JPN)	0
Henrik Haykyan (ARM)	5
Yusif Dursunov (AZE)	4
Aleksandre Abramishvili (GEO)	1

Semifinals
Yedige Kassimbek (KAZ)	8^{F}
Rakhman Malakhmedov (ANA)	2
Henrik Haykyan (ARM)	2
Yusif Dursunov (AZE)	6

Final
Yedige Kassimbek (KAZ)	2
Yusif Dursunov (AZE)	4

Repechage round 1
Marwan Ehab Mohamed (EGY)	0
Balazs Csipkes (ROU)	3
Eldorbek Khasanov (UZB)	4
Aleksandre Abramishvili (GEO)	9

Bronze medal match
Rakhman Malakhmedov (ANA)	10
Balazs Csipkes (ROU)	0
Henrik Haykyan (ARM)	11
Aleksandre Abramishvili (GEO)	0
