= 2023 Big Ten Wrestling Championships – 157 lbs =

157 pounds at the 2023 Big Ten Wrestling Championships
- Site: Crisler Center; Ann Arbor, Michigan
- Competitors: 14

Medalists
- 1st place, gold medalist(s): Peyton Robb (Nebraska)
- 2nd place, silver medalist(s): Levi Haines (Penn State)
- 3rd place, bronze medalist(s): Kendall Coleman (Purdue)

The 157-pound competition at the 2023 Big Ten Wrestling Championships in Ann Arbor, Michigan, took place from March 4–5, 2023 at the Crisler Center.

The competition consisted of a triple-elimination tournament to determine the top twelve wrestlers of the Big Ten's 157-pound weight class. The top ten wrestlers would qualify for the 2023 NCAA Division I Wrestling Championships.

== Preliminary seeds ==
The Big Ten announced the preliminary seeds on February 27, 2023.

Seed	Wrestler
1	Peyton Robb (Nebraska)
2	Levi Haines (Penn State)
3	Kendall Coleman (Purdue)
4	Chase Saldate (Michigan State)
5	Cobe Siebrecht (Iowa)
6	Will Lewan (Michigan)
7	Michael Carr (Illinois)
8	Trevor Chumbley (Northwestern)
9	Garrett Model (Wisconsin)
10	Derek Gilcher (Indiana)
11	Brayton Lee (Minnesota)
12	Paddy Gallagher (Ohio State)
13	Andrew Clark (Rutgers)
14	Michael North (Maryland)

== Results ==
Legend

- F — Won by fall
- MF — Won by medical forfeit

=== Championship bracket ===
First Round
1	Peyton Robb (NEB)
BYE
9	Garrett Model (WIS)	2
8	Trevor Chumbley (NU)	4
5	Cobe Siebrecht (IOWA)	8
12	Paddy Gallagher (OSU)	0
13	Andrew Clark (RUT)	2
4	Chase Saldate (MSU)	5
3	Kendall Coleman (PUR)	12
14	Michael North (MD)	3
11	Brayton Lee (MINN)	1
6	Will Lewan (MICH)	2
7	Michael Carr (ILL)	2
10	Derek Gilcher (IND)	10
BYE
2	Levi Haines (PSU)

Quarterfinals
1	Peyton Robb (NEB)	11
8	Trevor Chumbley (NU)	3
5	Cobe Siebrecht (IOWA)	2
4	Chase Saldate (MSU)	9
3	Kendall Coleman (PUR)	4
6	Will Lewan (MICH)	2
10	Derek Gilcher (IND)	0
2	Levi Haines (PSU)	6

Semifinals
1	Peyton Robb (NEB)	4
4	Chase Saldate (MSU)	3
3	Kendall Coleman (PUR)	2
2	Levi Haines (PSU)	3

1st-Place Match
1	Peyton Robb (NEB)	1
2	Levi Haines (PSU)	3

=== Consolation bracket ===
Consolation Round 1
BYE
BYE

Consolation Round 2

Consolation Quarterfinals
7th-Place Match

Consolation Semifinals
5th-Place Match

3rd-Place Match

=== 9th-place bracket ===
9th-Place Quarterfinals
7	Michael Carr (ILL)
BYE
14	Michael North (MD)	0
13	Andrew Clark (RUT)	4
12	Paddy Gallagher (OSU)
BYE
BYE
9	Garrett Model (WIS)

9th-Place Semifinals
7	Michael Carr (ILL)	6
13	Andrew Clark (RUT)	9
12	Paddy Gallagher (OSU)	2
9	Garrett Model (WIS)	3
11th-Place Match
7	Michael Carr (ILL)
12	Paddy Gallagher (OSU)	MF

9th-Place Match
13	Andrew Clark (RUT)	MF
9	Garrett Model (WIS)

== Final standings ==
Note: Top-10 wrestlers qualify for the 2023 NCAA Division I Wrestling Championships.

Rank	Wrestler
1st place, gold medalist(s)	Levi Haines (Penn State)
2nd place, silver medalist(s)	Peyton Robb (Nebraska)
3rd place, bronze medalist(s)	Will Lewan (Michigan)
4	Trevor Chumbley (Northwestern)
5	Chase Saldate (Michigan State)
6	Kendall Coleman (Purdue)
7	Cobe Siebrecht (Iowa)
8	Derek Gilcher (Indiana)
9	Andrew Clark (Rutgers)
10	Garrett Model (Wisconsin)
11	Paddy Gallagher (Ohio State)
12	Michael Carr (Illinois)
