= 2022 U17 World Wrestling Championships =

U17 wrestling championship

- Host city: Rome, Italy
- Dates: 25–31 July
- Stadium: PalaPellicone

Champions
- Freestyle: United States
- Greco-Roman: Iran
- Women: Japan

The 2022 U17 World Wrestling Championships (27th) took place from July 25 to 31 in Rome, Italy.

== Competition schedule ==
All times are (UTC+2)

Date	Time	Event
25 July	11.30-15.00	Qualification rounds GR – 48-55-65-80-110 kg
25 July	18:00-19.30	Semi Final GR – 48-55-65-80-110 kg
26 July	11.30-15.00	Qualification rounds GR – 45-51-60-71-92 kg; Repechage GR – 48-55-65-80-110 kg
26 July	17.00-17.45	Semi Final GR – 45-51-60-71-92 kg
26 July	18.00-20.00	Finals GR – 48-55-65-80-110 kg
27 July	11.00-14.00	Qualification rounds WW – 43-49-57-65-73 kg; Repechage GR – 45-51-60-71-92 kg
27 July	17.00-17.45	Semi Final WW – 43-49-57-65-73 kg
27 July	18.00-20.00	Finals GR – 45-51-60-71-92 kg
28 July	11.00-13.30	Qualification rounds WW – 40-46-53-61-69 kg; Repechage WW – 43-49-57-65-73 kg
28 July	17.00-17.45	Semi Final WW – 40-46-53-61-69 kg
28 July	18.00-20.00	Finals WW – 43-49-57-65-73 kg
29 July	11.00-14.30	Qualification rounds FS – 48-55-65-80-110 kg; Repechage WW – 40-46-53-61-69 kg
29 July	17.00-17.45	Semi-finals: FS – 48-55-65-80-110 kg
29 July	18.00-20.00	Finals WW – 40-46-53-61-69 kg
30 July	11.00-14.30	Qualification rounds FS – 45-51-60-71-92 kg; Repechage FS – 48-55-65-80-110 kg
30 July	17.00-17.45	Semi Final FS – 45-51-60-71-92 kg
30 July	18.00-21.00	Finals FS – 48-55-65-80-110 kg
31 July	16.30-17.45	Repechage FS – 45-51-60-71-92 kg
31 July	18.00-20.30	Finals FS – 45-51-60-71-92 kg
31 July	21.00	Final banquet

== Medal table ==
* Host nation (Italy)

Rank	Nation	Gold	Silver	Bronze	Total
1	India	7	1	6	14
2	United States	5	6	3	14
3	Azerbaijan	3	4	7	14
4	Japan	3	4	2	9
5	Iran	2	4	6	12
6	Ukraine	2	1	3	6
7	Georgia	2	0	5	7
8	Turkey	2	0	4	6
9	Kazakhstan	2	0	3	5
10	Uzbekistan	1	1	6	8
11	Armenia	1	0	3	4
12	Hungary	0	3	0	3
13	France	0	2	1	3
14	Kyrgyzstan	0	1	2	3
14	Romania	0	1	2	3
16	Germany	0	1	1	2
16	Italy	0	1	1	2
18	Croatia	0	0	1	1
18	Egypt	0	0	1	1
18	Moldova	0	0	1	1
18	Morocco	0	0	1	1
18	Netherlands	0	0	1	1
Totals (22 entries)		30	30	60	120

== Team ranking ==
Rank	Men's freestyle		Men's Greco-Roman		Women's freestyle	
Rank	Team	Points	Team	Points	Team	Points
1	United States	190	Iran	135	Japan	180
2	India	126	Azerbaijan	130	India	149
3	Azerbaijan	122	Georgia	121	Ukraine	112
4	Iran	117	Turkey	89	United States	107
5	Kazakhstan	110	India	78	Turkey	81
6	Georgia	62	Uzbekistan	75	Romania	54
7	Armenia	58	Armenia	64	Azerbaijan	46
8	Kyrgyzstan	44	United States	62	Kazakhstan	45
9	Japan	39	Ukraine	59	Uzbekistan	40
10	Uzbekistan	36	Kazakhstan	54	Hungary	38

== Medal overview ==
=== Men's freestyle ===
Event	Gold	Silver	Bronze
45 kg	Domenic Munaretto; United States	Bashir Verdiyev; Azerbaijan	Arman Harutyunyan; Armenia
45 kg	Domenic Munaretto; United States	Bashir Verdiyev; Azerbaijan	Nikoloz Botchorishvili; Georgia
48 kg	Vasif Baghirov; Azerbaijan	Christian Castillo; United States	Kumar Lalit; India
48 kg	Vasif Baghirov; Azerbaijan	Christian Castillo; United States	Arshia Bahram Haddadi; Iran
51 kg	Luke Lilledahl; United States	Mohammad Asadi; Iran	Ben Hachem Tarik; Morocco
51 kg	Luke Lilledahl; United States	Mohammad Asadi; Iran	Elman Aghayev; Azerbaijan
55 kg	Daryn Askerbek; Kazakhstan	Jax Forrest; United States	Husanboy Usmonov; Uzbekistan
55 kg	Daryn Askerbek; Kazakhstan	Jax Forrest; United States	Vaibhav Narayan Patil; India
60 kg	Ebrahim Elahichouran; Iran	Bilol Sharip Uulu; Kyrgyzstan	Nikhil Pilanagoila; India
60 kg	Ebrahim Elahichouran; Iran	Bilol Sharip Uulu; Kyrgyzstan	Taiga Ogino; Japan
65 kg	Ilyas Isayev; Azerbaijan	Tyler Kasak; United States	Goga Otinashvili; Georgia
65 kg	Ilyas Isayev; Azerbaijan	Tyler Kasak; United States	Ankit Ankit; India
71 kg	Joseph Sealey; United States	Raul Caso; Italy	Razmik Yepremyan; Armenia
71 kg	Joseph Sealey; United States	Raul Caso; Italy	Aghanazar Novruzov; Azerbaijan
80 kg	Mor Sachin; India	Reza Kamal Soleimanian; Iran	Zack Ryder; United States
80 kg	Mor Sachin; India	Reza Kamal Soleimanian; Iran	Alexandru Bors; Moldova
92 kg	Kamil Kurugliyev; Kazakhstan	Musza Arsunkaev; Hungary	Max McEnelly; United States
92 kg	Kamil Kurugliyev; Kazakhstan	Musza Arsunkaev; Hungary	Erfan Alizadeh Malafeh; Iran
110 kg	Koy Hopke; United States	Levon Lagvilava; France	Khikmatullo Kurbanov; Uzbekistan
110 kg	Koy Hopke; United States	Levon Lagvilava; France	Singh Jaspooran; India

=== Men's Greco-Roman ===
Event	Gold	Silver	Bronze
45 kg	Yevhen Pokovba; Ukraine	Shakhzod Ruziokhunov; Uzbekistan	Huseyn Savadov; Azerbaijan
45 kg	Yevhen Pokovba; Ukraine	Shakhzod Ruziokhunov; Uzbekistan	Payam Ahmadi Balootaki; Iran
48 kg	Ali Abdollah Ahmadi Vafa; Iran	Ronit Sharma; India	Said Khalilov; Azerbaijan
48 kg	Ali Abdollah Ahmadi Vafa; Iran	Ronit Sharma; India	Arsen Zhuma; Kazakhstan
51 kg	Aytjan Khalmakhanov; Uzbekistan	Mohammadreza Gholami; Iran	Manish Manish; India
51 kg	Aytjan Khalmakhanov; Uzbekistan	Mohammadreza Gholami; Iran	Vadat Gasimli; Azerbaijan
55 kg	Suraj Suraj; India	Faraim Mustafayev; Azerbaijan	Saba Surmanidze; Georgia
55 kg	Suraj Suraj; India	Faraim Mustafayev; Azerbaijan	Khurshidbek Normukhammadov; Uzbekistan
60 kg	Gaspar Terteryan; Armenia	Lucas Lo Grasso; France	Omar Mourad; Egypt
60 kg	Gaspar Terteryan; Armenia	Lucas Lo Grasso; France	Yussuf Ashrapov; Kazakhstan
65 kg	Joel Richard Adams; United States	Ahoura Bouveiri Piani; Iran	Bekhruz Barnoev; Uzbekistan
65 kg	Joel Richard Adams; United States	Ahoura Bouveiri Piani; Iran	Aleksandre Rusitashvili; Georgia
71 kg	Anri Putkaradze; Georgia	Davud Mammadov; Azerbaijan	Ararat Varderesyan; Armenia
71 kg	Anri Putkaradze; Georgia	Davud Mammadov; Azerbaijan	İbrahim Özdemir; Turkey
80 kg	Alperen Berber; Turkey	Ismayil Rzayev; Azerbaijan	Luka Gelashvili; Georgia
80 kg	Alperen Berber; Turkey	Ismayil Rzayev; Azerbaijan	Seyed Azarshab; Iran
92 kg	Gor Avazyan; Georgia	Darius Kiefer; Germany	Cody Merrill; United States
92 kg	Gor Avazyan; Georgia	Darius Kiefer; Germany	Hamidreza Keshtkar; Iran
110 kg	Cemal Yusuf Bakır; Turkey	Laszlo Darabos; Hungary	Mazaim Mardanov; Azerbaijan
110 kg	Cemal Yusuf Bakır; Turkey	Laszlo Darabos; Hungary	Mohammad Shahram Jahangiri; Iran

=== Women's freestyle ===
Event	Gold	Silver	Bronze
40 kg	Muskan Muskan; India	Mona Ezaka; Japan	Yevheniia Druzenko; Ukraine
40 kg	Muskan Muskan; India	Mona Ezaka; Japan	Diana Voiculescu; Romania
43 kg	Ritika Ritika; India	Erica Pastoriza; United States	Elvina Karimzada; Azerbaijan
43 kg	Ritika Ritika; India	Erica Pastoriza; United States	Anastasiia Polska; Ukraine
46 kg	Koko Matsuda; Japan	Gabriela Andrea Gomez; United States	Alexandra Voiculescu; Romania
46 kg	Koko Matsuda; Japan	Gabriela Andrea Gomez; United States	Yelyzaveta Kulakivska; Ukraine
49 kg	Ruzanna Mammadova; Azerbaijan	Mihoko Takeuchi; Japan	Şevval Çayır; Turkey
49 kg	Ruzanna Mammadova; Azerbaijan	Mihoko Takeuchi; Japan	Fabiana Rinella; Italy
53 kg	Mariia Yefremova; Ukraine	Sakura Onishi; Japan	Sevim Akbaş; Turkey
53 kg	Mariia Yefremova; Ukraine	Sakura Onishi; Japan	Lilya Yasmina Cohen; France
57 kg	Sowaka Uchida; Japan	Gerda Terek; Hungary	Ulmeken Esenbaeva; Uzbekistan
57 kg	Sowaka Uchida; Japan	Gerda Terek; Hungary	Tuba Demir; Turkey
61 kg	Savita Savita; India	Valerie Autumn Hamilton; United States	Suzu Sasaki; Japan
61 kg	Savita Savita; India	Valerie Autumn Hamilton; United States	Sevinch Sultonova; Uzbekistan
65 kg	Anju Sato; Japan	Maria Pantiru; Romania	Zharkynai Nurlan; Kyrgyzstan
65 kg	Anju Sato; Japan	Maria Pantiru; Romania	Reka Julian Van Os; Netherlands
69 kg	Harshita Harshita; India	Chisato Yoshida; Japan	Gulnura Tashtanbekova; Kyrgyzstan
69 kg	Harshita Harshita; India	Chisato Yoshida; Japan	Veronika Vilk; Croatia
73 kg	Priya Malik; India	Mariia Zenkina; Ukraine	Alina Yertostik; Kazakhstan
73 kg	Priya Malik; India	Mariia Zenkina; Ukraine	Lotta Englich; Germany

== Participating nations ==
570 wrestlers from 51 countries:

1. Armenia (16)
2. Australia (1)
3. Austria (7)
4. Azerbaijan (26)
5. Barbados (2)
6. Bulgaria (22)
7. Canada (4)
8. Croatia (7)
9. Czech Republic (4)
10. Egypt (15)
11. Spain (2)
12. Estonia (5)
13. Finland (5)
14. France (9)
15. Georgia (19)
16. Germany (10)
17. Greece (12)
18. Hungary (16)
19. India (30)
20. Iran (20)
21. Israel (3)
22. Italy (27) (Host)
23. Japan (29)
24. Kazakhstan (27)
25. Kyrgyzstan (21)
26. Kosovo (2)
27. Latvia (2)
28. Lithuania (8)
29. Morocco (2)
30. Moldova (12)
31. Mexico (1)
32. Mongolia (1)
33. North Macedonia (2)
34. Netherlands (1)
35. Norway (4)
36. New Zealand (2)
37. Poland (16)
38. Romania (15)
39. South Africa (9)
40. Serbia (4)
41. Switzerland (7)
42. Slovakia (2)
43. Sweden (5)
44. Tonga (1)
45. Tajikistan (1)
46. Turkmenistan (6)
47. Chinese Taipei (15)
48. Turkey (30)
49. Ukraine (30)
50. United States (30)
51. Uzbekistan (19)
