= 2023 U17 World Wrestling Championships =

- Host city: Istanbul, Turkey
- Dates: 31 July–6 August 2023
- Stadium: Başakşehir Youth and Sports Facility

Champions
- Freestyle: Iran
- Greco-Roman: Iran
- Women: Japan

The 2023 U17 World Wrestling Championships (28th) took place from July 31 to 6 August in Istanbul, Turkey.

== Competition schedule ==
All times are (UTC+3)

Date	Time	Event
31 July	11.00-15.00	Qualification rounds GR – 48-55-65-80-110 kg
31 July	18.00-19.30	Semi-finals GR – 48-55-65-80-110 kg
1 August	11.00-14.30	Qualification rounds GR – 45-51-60-71-92 kg; Repechage GR – 48-55-65-80-110 kg
1 August	17.00-17.45	Semi-finals: GR – 45-51-60-71-92 kg
1 August	18.00-20.00	Finals GR – 48-55-65-80-110 kg
2 August	11.00-14.00	Qualification rounds WW – 43-49-57-65-73 kg; Repechage GR – 45-51-60-71-92 kg
2 August	17.00-17.45	Semi-finals WW – 43-49-57-65-73 kg
2 August	18.00-20.00	Finals GR – 45-51-60-71-92 kg
3 August	11.30-14.00	Qualification rounds WW – 40-46-53-61-69 kg; Repechage WW – 43-49-57-65-73 kg
3 August	17.00-17.45	Semi-finals WW – 40-46-53-61-69 kg
3 August	18.00-20.00	Finals WW – 43-49-57-65-73 kg
4 August	11.30-14.00	Qualification rounds FS – 48-55-65-80-110 kg; Repechage WW – 40-46-53-61-69 kg
4 August	17.00-17.45	Semi-finals: FS – 48-55-65-80-110 kg
4 August	18.00-20.00	Finals WW – 40-46-53-61-69 kg
5 August	11.30-14.00	Qualification rounds FS – 45-51-60-71-92 kg; Repechage FS – 48-55-65-80-110 kg
5 August	16.45-17.45	Semi-finals: FS – 45-51-60-71-92 kg
5 August	18.00-21.00	Finals FS – 48-55-65-80-110 kg
6 August	16.30-17.45	Repechage : FS – 45-51-60-71-92 kg
6 August	18.00-20.00	Finals : FS – 45-51-60-71-92 kg

== Medal table ==
* Host nation (Turkey)

Rank	Nation	Gold	Silver	Bronze	Total
1	Japan	9	3	0	12
2	United States	6	0	8	14
–	Individual Neutral Athletes ^{a}	3	6	16	25
3	Iran	3	3	4	10
4	Azerbaijan	3	1	2	6
5	Georgia	2	1	2	5
6	India	1	7	3	11
7	Turkey*	1	3	4	8
8	Croatia	1	0	0	1
8	Greece	1	0	0	1
10	Armenia	0	2	6	8
11	Uzbekistan	0	1	5	6
12	Kazakhstan	0	1	2	3
13	Germany	0	1	1	2
14	Moldova	0	1	0	1
15	Bulgaria	0	0	1	1
15	Egypt	0	0	1	1
15	Italy	0	0	1	1
15	Kyrgyzstan	0	0	1	1
15	Norway	0	0	1	1
15	Puerto Rico	0	0	1	1
15	Romania	0	0	1	1
Totals (21 entries)		30	30	60	120

== Russian and Belarusian participation ==
a In accordance with sanctions imposed following by the Russian invasion of Ukraine, wrestlers from Russia and Belarus were not permitted to use the name, flag, or anthem of Russia or Belarus. They instead participated as "Individual Neutral Athletes (AIN)", their medals were not included in the official medal table.

== Team ranking ==
Rank	Men's freestyle		Men's Greco-Roman		Women's freestyle	
Rank	Team	Points	Team	Points	Team	Points
1	Iran	156	Iran	113	Japan	200
2	United States	126	Azerbaijan	108	United States	122
3	Japan	106	Georgia	96	India	118
4	Azerbaijan	84	India	88	Turkey	104
5	Armenia	79	Armenia	77	Uzbekistan	79
6	India	74	Uzbekistan	72	Germany	40
7	Georgia	72	Kazakhstan	64	Kazakhstan	36
8	Kazakhstan	64	Turkey	52	Poland	28
9	Turkmenistan	38	United States	43	Norway	27
10	Turkey	35	Kyrgyzstan	39	Croatia	25

== Medal overview ==
=== Men's freestyle ===
Event	Gold	Silver	Bronze
45 kg	Ahora Khateri; Iran	Gor Buniatyan; Armenia	Ebubekir Gür; Turkey
45 kg	Ahora Khateri; Iran	Gor Buniatyan; Armenia	Ignacio Villasenor; United States
48 kg	Paul Joseph Kenny; United States	Yamato Furusawa; Japan	Joseph Bachmann; Puerto Rico
48 kg	Paul Joseph Kenny; United States	Yamato Furusawa; Japan	Sam Reza Sayar; Iran
51 kg	Yamato Ogawa; Japan	Rohit; India	Sasha Petrosyan; Armenia
51 kg	Yamato Ogawa; Japan	Rohit; India	Usman Indirbaev; Authorised Neutral Athletes
55 kg	Marcus Blaze; United States	Ankush; India	Samvel Gevorgyan; Armenia
55 kg	Marcus Blaze; United States	Ankush; India	Akhmad Musakhadzhiev; Authorised Neutral Athletes
60 kg	Akito Maehara; Japan	Sajad Pirdayeh; Iran	Jamal Abbasov; Azerbaijan
60 kg	Akito Maehara; Japan	Sajad Pirdayeh; Iran	Yasin Bersanukaev; Authorised Neutral Athletes
65 kg	Sina Khalili; Iran	Magomed Alibakharchiev; Authorised Neutral Athletes	Manuel Wagin; Germany
65 kg	Sina Khalili; Iran	Magomed Alibakharchiev; Authorised Neutral Athletes	Brock Mantanona; United States
71 kg	Ladarion Lockett; United States	Seyedabolfazl Hosseini; Iran	Nurdaulet Seilbekov; Kazakhstan
71 kg	Ladarion Lockett; United States	Seyedabolfazl Hosseini; Iran	Islam Kazharov; Authorised Neutral Athletes
80 kg	Magomed Idrisov; Authorised Neutral Athletes	Alexandru Bors; Moldova	Konstantine Petriashvili; Georgia
80 kg	Magomed Idrisov; Authorised Neutral Athletes	Alexandru Bors; Moldova	Zackary Ryder; United States
92 kg	Sandro Kurashvili; Georgia	Eyyüp Çetin; Turkey	Samir Dursunov; Kazakhstan
92 kg	Sandro Kurashvili; Georgia	Eyyüp Çetin; Turkey	Toohid Noory; Iran
110 kg	Yusif Dursunov; Azerbaijan	Yedige Kassimbek; Kazakhstan	Henrik Haykyan; Armenia
110 kg	Yusif Dursunov; Azerbaijan	Yedige Kassimbek; Kazakhstan	Rakhman Malakhmedov; Authorised Neutral Athletes

=== Men's Greco-Roman ===
Event	Gold	Silver	Bronze
45 kg	Turan Dashdamirov; Azerbaijan	Rustem Abatsiev; Authorised Neutral Athletes	Alireza Ghasroddashti; Iran
45 kg	Turan Dashdamirov; Azerbaijan	Rustem Abatsiev; Authorised Neutral Athletes	Yurik Mkhitaryan; Armenia
48 kg	Payam Balootaki; Iran	Shakhzod Ruziokhunov; Uzbekistan	Elnar Ziyadov; Azerbaijan
48 kg	Payam Balootaki; Iran	Shakhzod Ruziokhunov; Uzbekistan	Edgar Petrosyan; Armenia
51 kg	Ilia Kandalin; Authorised Neutral Athletes	Artur Broyan; Armenia	Manu Yadav; India
51 kg	Ilia Kandalin; Authorised Neutral Athletes	Artur Broyan; Armenia	Koba Karumidze; Georgia
55 kg	Jordyn Raney; United States	Suraj; India	Aytjan Khalmakhanov; Uzbekistan
55 kg	Jordyn Raney; United States	Suraj; India	Kuttubek Rysmatov; Kyrgyzstan
60 kg	Roman Karimov; Azerbaijan	Saba Surmanidze; Georgia	Mingiian Goriaev; Authorised Neutral Athletes
60 kg	Roman Karimov; Azerbaijan	Saba Surmanidze; Georgia	Kiryl Valeuski; Authorised Neutral Athletes
65 kg	Zaur Beslekoev; Authorised Neutral Athletes	Yusif Ahmadli; Azerbaijan	Islombek Karimjonov; Uzbekistan
65 kg	Zaur Beslekoev; Authorised Neutral Athletes	Yusif Ahmadli; Azerbaijan	Kumar Sachin; India
71 kg	Arionas Kolitsopoulos; Greece	Ahmadreza Mohamadian; Iran	Abdurakhman Abdulkadyrov; Authorised Neutral Athletes
71 kg	Arionas Kolitsopoulos; Greece	Ahmadreza Mohamadian; Iran	Alkan Akar; Turkey
80 kg	Taizo Yoshida; Japan	Mikhail Shkarin; Authorised Neutral Athletes	Erik Ter-Matevosyan; Armenia
80 kg	Taizo Yoshida; Japan	Mikhail Shkarin; Authorised Neutral Athletes	Uladzislau Dubrouski; Authorised Neutral Athletes
92 kg	Saba Purtseladze; Georgia	Saipula Gadzhimagomedov; Authorised Neutral Athletes	Gabriel Eduardo Stan; Romania
92 kg	Saba Purtseladze; Georgia	Saipula Gadzhimagomedov; Authorised Neutral Athletes	Mikayil Ismayilov; Azerbaijan
110 kg	Cemal Yusuf Bakır; Turkey	Ronak; India	Eldar Emirov; Authorised Neutral Athletes
110 kg	Cemal Yusuf Bakır; Turkey	Ronak; India	Amirhossein Abdevali; Iran

=== Women's freestyle ===
Event	Gold	Silver	Bronze
40 kg	Koharu Akutsu; Japan	Rachana; India	Jaclyn Bouzakis; United States
40 kg	Koharu Akutsu; Japan	Rachana; India	Shokhista Shonazarova; Uzbekistan
43 kg	Morgan Nicole Turner; United States	Mona Ezaka; Japan	Aleksandra Berezovskaia; Authorised Neutral Athletes
43 kg	Morgan Nicole Turner; United States	Mona Ezaka; Japan	Nilufar Nurmukhammadova; Uzbekistan
46 kg	Natsumi Masuda; Japan	Muskan; India	Hava Konca; Turkey
46 kg	Natsumi Masuda; Japan	Muskan; India	Diana Rybchenko; Authorised Neutral Athletes
49 kg	Rinka Ogawa; Japan	Sviatlana Katenka; Authorised Neutral Athletes	Heather Crull; United States
49 kg	Rinka Ogawa; Japan	Sviatlana Katenka; Authorised Neutral Athletes	Tana Tiuliush; Authorised Neutral Athletes
53 kg	Sakura Onishi; Japan	Olga Ovchinnikova; Authorised Neutral Athletes	Sakibjamal Esbosynova; Uzbekistan
53 kg	Sakura Onishi; Japan	Olga Ovchinnikova; Authorised Neutral Athletes	Fabiana Rinella; Italy
57 kg	Sowaka Uchida; Japan	Eylem Engin; Turkey	Neha; India
57 kg	Sowaka Uchida; Japan	Eylem Engin; Turkey	Viktoria Boynova; Bulgaria
61 kg	Savita; India	Konami Ono; Japan	Leah Samsonsen; Norway
61 kg	Savita; India	Konami Ono; Japan	Haylie Jaffee; United States
65 kg	Chisato Yoshida; Japan	Duygu Gen; Turkey	Mouda Badawi Hamdoun; Egypt
65 kg	Chisato Yoshida; Japan	Duygu Gen; Turkey	Margarita Salnazarian; Authorised Neutral Athletes
69 kg	Veronika Vilk; Croatia	Srishti; India	Liliana Kazmina; Authorised Neutral Athletes
69 kg	Veronika Vilk; Croatia	Srishti; India	Jasmine Dolores; United States
73 kg	Piper Fowler; United States	Lotta Englich; Germany	Aliaksandra Kazlova; Authorised Neutral Athletes
73 kg	Piper Fowler; United States	Lotta Englich; Germany	Elmira Yasin; Turkey

== Participating nations ==
589 wrestlers from 55 nations:

1. Individual Neutral Athletes (56)
2. Algeria (5)
3. Armenia (19)
4. Austria (4)
5. Azerbaijan (24)
6. Burundi (1)
7. Brazil (1)
8. Bulgaria (10)
9. Colombia (1)
10. Croatia (6)
11. Czech Republic (3)
12. Ecuador (3)
13. Egypt (15)
14. Spain (4)
15. Estonia (9)
16. Finland (4)
17. France (8)
18. United Kingdom (1)
19. Georgia (23)
20. Germany (11)
21. Greece (13)
22. Hungary (18)
23. India (30)
24. Iran (20)
25. Iraq (3)
26. Israel (8)
27. Italy (3)
28. Japan (30)
29. Kazakhstan (30)
30. Kyrgyzstan (25)
31. South Korea (6)
32. Kosovo (1)
33. Latvia (1)
34. Lithuania (3)
35. Madagascar (1)
36. Moldova (13)
37. Mexico (3)
38. Mongolia (16)
39. North Macedonia (3)
40. Namibia (3)
41. Norway (4)
42. New Zealand (1)
43. Palestine (1)
44. Poland (20)
45. Puerto Rico (7)
46. Romania (11)
47. South Africa (4)
48. Slovenia (2)
49. Serbia (6)
50. Switzerland (3)
51. Slovakia (6)
52. Tajikistan (2)
53. Turkmenistan (12)
54. Chinese Taipei (6)
55. Turkey (35) (Host)
56. United States (31)
