= 2024 European U20 Wrestling Championships – Men's Greco-Roman =

The Men's Greco-Roman competitions at the 2024 European U20 Wrestling Championships were held alongside the U17 Championships in Novi Sad, Serbia between 1 and 3 July 2024.

== Men's Greco-Roman 55 kg ==
1 and 2 July

Legend

- F — Won by fall

Final

Final
Maxim Sarmanov (MDA)	0
Papik Dzhavadian (AIN)	8

Top half

Round of 32
Péter Tótok (HUN)	4
Filip Bartošík (CZE)	1
Yordan Topalov (BUL)	9
Danijel Ozvegy (SRB)	0
Dragoș Draga (ROU)	0
Vasileios Papageorgiou (GRE)	4^{F}

Round of 16
Kacper Sobczyk (POL)	5
Andi Muça (ALB)	3
Péter Tótok (HUN)	9
Richard Pajuviidik (EST)	1
Maxim Sarmanov (MDA)	9
Yordan Topalov (BUL)	0
Vasileios Papageorgiou (GRE)	3
Yevhen Pokovba (UKR)	3

Quarterfinals
Kacper Sobczyk (POL)	0
Péter Tótok (HUN)	8
Maxim Sarmanov (MDA)	9
Vasileios Papageorgiou (GRE)	5

Semifinals
Péter Tótok (HUN)	1
Maxim Sarmanov (MDA)	5

Bottom half

Round of 32
Luka Javakhadze (GEO)	1
Rahim Hasanov (AZE)	2
Atte Suhonen (FIN)	4
James Castaño (ESP)	2

Round of 16
Tiago Silva (POR)	0
Armen Gevorgyan (ARM)	10
Rahim Hasanov (AZE)	9
Mark Wagner (GER)	0
Papik Dzhavadian (AIN)	8
Atte Suhonen (FIN)	0
Brage Sæther (NOR)	0
Şervan Çınar (TUR)	8

Quarterfinals
Armen Gevorgyan (ARM)	2
Rahim Hasanov (AZE)	3
Papik Dzhavadian (AIN)	8
Şervan Çınar (TUR)	0

Semifinals
Rahim Hasanov (AZE)	1
Papik Dzhavadian (AIN)	11^{F}

Repechage round 2
Yordan Topalov (BUL)	0
Vasileios Papageorgiou (GRE)	9
Atte Suhonen (FIN)	0
Şervan Çınar (TUR)	9

Bronze medal match
Vasileios Papageorgiou (GRE)	1
Péter Tótok (HUN)	10
Şervan Çınar (TUR)	8
Rahim Hasanov (AZE)	0

== Men's Greco-Roman 60 kg ==
2 and 3 July

Legend

- F — Won by fall

Final

Final
Dordzhi Shungurtsikov (AIN)	3
Adam Silverin (SWE)	3

Top half

Round of 32
Maxim Carauş (MDA)	0
Kristiyan Milenkov (BUL)	8

Round of 16
Servet Angı (TUR)	11
Marco Branquinho (POR)	0
Kristiyan Milenkov (BUL)	3
Dordzhi Shungurtsikov (AIN)	11
Lucas Lo Grasso (FRA)	3
Edmond Domokos (HUN)	7
Uladzimir Kastaronak (AIN)	15
Aleksandar Berarov (SRB)	6

Quarterfinals
Servet Angı (TUR)	5
Dordzhi Shungurtsikov (AIN)	15
Edmond Domokos (HUN)	6
Uladzimir Kastaronak (AIN)	4

Semifinals
Dordzhi Shungurtsikov (AIN)	4
Edmond Domokos (HUN)	1

Bottom half

Round of 32

Round of 16
Beso Makharadze (GEO)	1
Tural Ahmadov (AZE)	2
Adam Silverin (SWE)	7
Ilias Zairakis (GRE)	1
Armen Sukiasyan (ARM)	6
Dominik Partyka (POL)	0
Alexandru Ghețău (MDA)	3
Bohdan Hryshyn (UKR)	12

Quarterfinals
Tural Ahmadov (AZE)	3
Adam Silverin (SWE)	4
Armen Sukiasyan (ARM)	1
Bohdan Hryshyn (UKR)	3

Semifinals
Adam Silverin (SWE)	2
Bohdan Hryshyn (UKR)	1

Repechage round 2
Kristiyan Milenkov (BUL)	0
Servet Angı (TUR)	9^{F}
Ilias Zairakis (GRE)	0
Tural Ahmadov (AZE)	12

Bronze medal match
Servet Angı (TUR)	9
Edmond Domokos (HUN)	0
Tural Ahmadov (AZE)	3
Bohdan Hryshyn (UKR)	1

== Men's Greco-Roman 63 kg ==
1 and 2 July

Legend

- F — Won by fall

Final

Final
Anri Khozrevanidze (GEO)	0
Erzu Zakriev (AIN)	9

Top half

Round of 32
Mahammad Shukurzade (AZE)	8
Pavel Denisenco (MDA)	0
Dejan Berkec (SRB)	10
Mathias Martinetti (SUI)	0
Lukas Benzing (GER)	10
Athanasios Efthymiadis (GRE)	0

Round of 16
William Ekerot (SWE)	8
Matouš Jankovič (CZE)	4
Mahammad Shukurzade (AZE)	9
Bers Idal Timirbiev (NOR)	0
Anri Khozrevanidze (GEO)	6
Dejan Berkec (SRB)	1
Lukas Benzing (GER)	1
Ilian Ainaoui (FRA)	3

Quarterfinals
William Ekerot (SWE)	0
Mahammad Shukurzade (AZE)	9
Anri Khozrevanidze (GEO)	1
Ilian Ainaoui (FRA)	1

Semifinals
Mahammad Shukurzade (AZE)	1
Anri Khozrevanidze (GEO)	3

Bottom half

Round of 32
Davide Zilio (ITA)	2
Ivan Nehoda (AIN)	11
Arsen Tovmasyan (UKR)	5
Grisha Nazaryan (BUL)	1
Yurik Hoveyan (ARM)	10
Pavel Alexe (ROU)	0

Round of 16
Enes Ülkü (TUR)	11
Ivan Nehoda (AIN)	1
Arsen Tovmasyan (UKR)	0
Erzu Zakriev (AIN)	11
Bilal Mouskhabov (BEL)	0
Yurik Hoveyan (ARM)	8
Dániel Rafael (HUN)	7
Kajetan Jakubowski (POL)	2

Quarterfinals
Enes Ülkü (TUR)	0
Erzu Zakriev (AIN)	9
Yurik Hoveyan (ARM)	8
Dániel Rafael (HUN)	0

Semifinals
Erzu Zakriev (AIN)	7
Yurik Hoveyan (ARM)	0

Repechage round 2
Dejan Berkec (SRB)	2
Ilian Ainaoui (FRA)	1
Arsen Tovmasyan (UKR)	0
Enes Ülkü (TUR)	9

Bronze medal match
Dejan Berkec (SRB)	1
Mahammad Shukurzade (AZE)	5
Enes Ülkü (TUR)	4
Yurik Hoveyan (ARM)	14

== Men's Greco-Roman 67 kg ==
2 and 3 July

Legend

- F — Won by fall

Final

Final
Gaspar Terteryan (ARM)	3
Grair Oganesian (AIN)	4

Top half

Round of 32
Aleksandrs Tumarevičs (LAT)	1
Jakub Suchecki (POL)	3
Anatolii Pasnak (UKR)	9
Magnus Rasmussen (DEN)	1
Dávid Mányik (HUN)	11
Isa Bektemirov (AUT)	2
Kipras Puikis (LTU)	1
Fritz Reber (SUI)	4

Round of 16
Tim Bergfalk (SWE)	9
Jakub Suchecki (POL)	0
Anatolii Pasnak (UKR)	3
Onni Mäkelä (FIN)	1
Polykarpos Patouchas (GRE)	1
Dávid Mányik (HUN)	10
Fritz Reber (SUI)	0
Gaspar Terteryan (ARM)	11

Quarterfinals
Tim Bergfalk (SWE)	8
Anatolii Pasnak (UKR)	9
Dávid Mányik (HUN)	1
Gaspar Terteryan (ARM)	5

Semifinals
Anatolii Pasnak (UKR)	0
Gaspar Terteryan (ARM)	4

Bottom half

Round of 32
Octavian Cerneţchi (MDA)	8^{F}
Dimitar Georgiev (BUL)	0
Grair Oganesian (AIN)	5
Faraim Mustafayev (AZE)	3
Artur Jeremejev (EST)	5^{F}
Federico Raccagni (ITA)	0
Ramazan Can Aktaş (TUR)	9
Ardit Zeneli (ALB)	0

Round of 16
Viachaslau Zhehalau (AIN)	6
Octavian Cerneţchi (MDA)	2
Grair Oganesian (AIN)	8
Iosif Ionescu (ROU)	0
Noe Poč (SRB)	1
Artur Jeremejev (EST)	3
Ramazan Can Aktaş (TUR)	3
Rati Khozrevanidze (GEO)	9

Quarterfinals
Viachaslau Zhehalau (AIN)	1
Grair Oganesian (AIN)	3
Artur Jeremejev (EST)	0
Rati Khozrevanidze (GEO)	11

Semifinals
Grair Oganesian (AIN)	8
Rati Khozrevanidze (GEO)	0

Repechage round 1
Faraim Mustafayev (AZE)	11
Iosif Ionescu (ROU)	3

Repechage round 2
Fritz Reber (SUI)	4
Dávid Mányik (HUN)	8
Faraim Mustafayev (AZE)	10
Viachaslau Zhehalau (AIN)	1

Bronze medal match
Dávid Mányik (HUN)	8
Anatolii Pasnak (UKR)	2
Faraim Mustafayev (AZE)	0
Rati Khozrevanidze (GEO)	11

== Men's Greco-Roman 72 kg ==
2 and 3 July

Legend

- F — Won by fall

Final

Final
Muhammed Ali Göçmen (TUR)	3
Rokas Čepauskas (LTU)	4

Top half

Round of 32
Zaur Beslekoev (AIN)	8
Attila Józsa (HUN)	0
Zalan Pek (SRB)	0
Muhammed Ali Göçmen (TUR)	8
Max Hristjuk (EST)	1
Nika Glonti (GEO)	3

Round of 16
Illia Valeuski (AIN)	6
Leonard Iuraşcu (ROU)	0
Zaur Beslekoev (AIN)	6
Ashot Khachatryan (ARM)	5
Lars Letvik (NOR)	0
Muhammed Ali Göçmen (TUR)	5
Nika Glonti (GEO)	6
Vasile Zabica (MDA)	1

Quarterfinals
Illia Valeuski (AIN)	5
Zaur Beslekoev (AIN)	2
Muhammed Ali Göçmen (TUR)	4
Nika Glonti (GEO)	2

Semifinals
Illia Valeuski (AIN)	3
Muhammed Ali Göçmen (TUR)	4

Bottom half

Round of 32
Oliver Pada (FIN)	9
Xhord Gjoni (ALB)	0
Ruslan Nurullayev (AZE)	3
Maksym Radyk (UKR)	1
Rokas Čepauskas (LTU)	7
Arionas Kolitsopoulos (GRE)	3
Hubert Sidoruk (POL)	2
Rasmus Ulriksen (DEN)	2

Round of 16
Spartak Valentinov (BUL)	0
Oliver Pada (FIN)	2
Ruslan Nurullayev (AZE)	3
Luka Ivančić (CRO)	1
Dalgat Magomedov (CZE)	1
Rokas Čepauskas (LTU)	3
Rasmus Ulriksen (DEN)	5
Denny Chjan (SWE)	6^{F}

Quarterfinals
Oliver Pada (FIN)	1
Ruslan Nurullayev (AZE)	3
Rokas Čepauskas (LTU)	3
Denny Chjan (SWE)	1

Semifinals
Ruslan Nurullayev (AZE)	1
Rokas Čepauskas (LTU)	5

Repechage round 1
Zalan Pek (SRB)	8
Lars Letvik (NOR)	2
Arionas Kolitsopoulos (GRE)	4
Dalgat Magomedov (CZE)	2

Repechage round 2
Zalan Pek (SRB)	0
Nika Glonti (GEO)	3
Arionas Kolitsopoulos (GRE)	3
Denny Chjan (SWE)	1

Bronze medal match
Nika Glonti (GEO)	0
Illia Valeuski (AIN)	9
Arionas Kolitsopoulos (GRE)	1
Ruslan Nurullayev (AZE)	4

== Men's Greco-Roman 77 kg ==
1 and 2 July

Legend

- F — Won by fall

Final

Final
Levente Lévai (HUN)	3
Alexandru Solovei (MDA)	2

Top half

Round of 32
Irfan Mirzoiev (UKR)	9
Ognjen Jakovljević (SRB)	1
Gamzat Gadzhiev (AIN)	9
Zakhar Yanevich (AIN)	1
Rainer Plaser (EST)	0
Davud Mammadov (AZE)	8

Round of 16
Ibrahim Tabaev (BEL)	8
Frederik Mathiesen (DEN)	0
Irfan Mirzoiev (UKR)	9
Iulian Lungu (ROU)	0
Levente Lévai (HUN)	3
Gamzat Gadzhiev (AIN)	1
Davud Mammadov (AZE)	3
Miro Leinonen (FIN)	1

Quarterfinals
Ibrahim Tabaev (BEL)	1
Irfan Mirzoiev (UKR)	3
Levente Lévai (HUN)	6
Davud Mammadov (AZE)	4

Semifinals
Irfan Mirzoiev (UKR)	2
Levente Lévai (HUN)	5

Bottom half

Round of 32
Oskar Lubera (POL)	0
Erkan Tuğcu (TUR)	9
Alexandru Solovei (MDA)	4
Tornike Mikeladze (GEO)	0

Round of 16
Hugo Baff (SWE)	8
Emmanouil Stamos (FRA)	0
Erkan Tuğcu (TUR)	6
Mihael Lukač (CRO)	5
Alexander Åmås (NOR)	0
Alexandru Solovei (MDA)	8
Henrik Gevorgyan (ARM)	6
Dimitar Rachev (BUL)	4

Quarterfinals
Hugo Baff (SWE)	5
Erkan Tuğcu (TUR)	2
Alexandru Solovei (MDA)	9
Henrik Gevorgyan (ARM)	4

Semifinals
Hugo Baff (SWE)	0
Alexandru Solovei (MDA)	5

Repechage round 1
Tornike Mikeladze (GEO)	9
Alexander Åmås (NOR)	0

Repechage round 2
Gamzat Gadzhiev (AIN)	7
Davud Mammadov (AZE)	4
Tornike Mikeladze (GEO)	7
Henrik Gevorgyan (ARM)	2

Bronze medal match
Gamzat Gadzhiev (AIN)	7
Irfan Mirzoiev (UKR)	5
Tornike Mikeladze (GEO)	6
Hugo Baff (SWE)	3

== Men's Greco-Roman 82 kg ==
2 and 3 July

Legend

- F — Won by fall

Final

Final
Alperen Berber (TUR)	8
Ismail Rzayev (AZE)	0

Top half

Round of 32
Alperen Berber (TUR)	10
Gabriel Stan (ROU)	0
Alexandr Pleșcan (MDA)	0
Stanisław Fussy (POL)	8
Ramazan Pashaiev (UKR)	3
Miloš Perović (SRB)	0
Luka Gelashvili (GEO)	6
Uladzislau Dubrouski (AIN)	4

Round of 16
Alan Totrov (AIN)	1
Alperen Berber (TUR)	6
Stanisław Fussy (POL)	8
Odysseas Roungeris (GRE)	0
Paul Mayer (AUT)	0
Ramazan Pashaiev (UKR)	3
Luka Gelashvili (GEO)	5
Haïk Sargsyan (FRA)	1

Quarterfinals
Alperen Berber (TUR)	9
Stanisław Fussy (POL)	0
Ramazan Pashaiev (UKR)	2
Luka Gelashvili (GEO)	1

Semifinals
Alperen Berber (TUR)	1
Ramazan Pashaiev (UKR)	1

Bottom half

Round of 32
Platon Špolianskij (LTU)	0
Antonio Lukač (CRO)	9
Ismail Rzayev (AZE)	8
Omer Barak (ISR)	0
Erik Ter-Matevosyan (ARM)	9
Uku Eskel (EST)	0
Jesper Härkänen (FIN)	5
Vano Hautjunian (DEN)	1

Round of 16
Dominic Arnold (GER)	1
Antonio Lukač (CRO)	8
Ismail Rzayev (AZE)	5^{F}
Martin Shishekov (BUL)	0
Patrik Miksa (CZE)	0
Erik Ter-Matevosyan (ARM)	8
Jesper Härkänen (FIN)	1
Dominik Czuczor (HUN)	3

Quarterfinals
Antonio Lukač (CRO)	0
Ismail Rzayev (AZE)	9
Erik Ter-Matevosyan (ARM)	3
Dominik Czuczor (HUN)	1

Semifinals
Ismail Rzayev (AZE)	2
Erik Ter-Matevosyan (ARM)	1

Repechage round 1
Gabriel Stan (ROU)	1
Alan Totrov (AIN)	8
Omer Barak (ISR)	2
Martin Shishekov (BUL)	4

Repechage round 2
Alan Totrov (AIN)	11
Stanisław Fussy (POL)	1
Martin Shishekov (BUL)	0
Antonio Lukač (CRO)	9^{F}

Bronze medal match
Alan Totrov (AIN)	2
Ramazan Pashaiev (UKR)	2
Antonio Lukač (CRO)	0
Erik Ter-Matevosyan (ARM)	4

== Men's Greco-Roman 87 kg ==
1 and 2 July

Legend

- F — Won by fall

Final

Final
Hamza Sertcanli (SWE)	1
Achiko Bolkvadze (GEO)	2

Top half

Round of 32
Olivér Kovács (HUN)	3
Aleksandr Krikukha (AIN)	7

Round of 16
Toygun Aktop (TUR)	0
Hamza Sertcanli (SWE)	3
Aleksandr Krikukha (AIN)	8
Giulio Bellon (ITA)	0
Ruben Gevorgyan (ARM)	4
Cristian Rusu (MDA)	0
Elias Lyyski (FIN)	0
Patrik Gordan (ROU)	9

Quarterfinals
Hamza Sertcanli (SWE)	5
Aleksandr Krikukha (AIN)	0
Ruben Gevorgyan (ARM)	2
Patrik Gordan (ROU)	7

Semifinals
Hamza Sertcanli (SWE)	6^{F}
Patrik Gordan (ROU)	2

Bottom half

Round of 32
Andrey Atanasov (BUL)	0
Achiko Bolkvadze (GEO)	9

Round of 16
Ali Guliyev (AZE)	1
Andrija Mihajlović (SRB)	1
Yahor Novikau (AIN)	0
Eleftherios Pappas (GRE)	3
Ivan Liakh (UKR)	0
Achiko Bolkvadze (GEO)	8
Wojciech Iwanowski (POL)	10
Martin Ljosåk (NOR)	1

Quarterfinals
Andrija Mihajlović (SRB)	1
Eleftherios Pappas (GRE)	1
Achiko Bolkvadze (GEO)	4
Wojciech Iwanowski (POL)	3

Semifinals
Andrija Mihajlović (SRB)	1
Achiko Bolkvadze (GEO)	4

Repechage round 1
Andrey Atanasov (BUL)	8^{F}
Ivan Liakh (UKR)	5

Repechage round 2
Toygun Aktop (TUR)	2
Aleksandr Krikukha (AIN)	4^{F}
Andrey Atanasov (BUL)	3
Wojciech Iwanowski (POL)	11

Bronze medal match
Aleksandr Krikukha (AIN)	7
Patrik Gordan (ROU)	1
Wojciech Iwanowski (POL)	1
Andrija Mihajlović (SRB)	2

== Men's Greco-Roman 97 kg ==
2 and 3 July

Legend

- F — Won by fall

Main bracket

Round of 16
Sebastian Warchoł (POL)	7
Mahir Gurbanli (AZE)	2
Ionuț Manolache (ROU)	4^{F}
Christos Chatsatourov (GRE)	2
Hunor Kudelász (HUN)	8
Rasmus Liisma (EST)	0
Darius Kiefer (GER)	3
Arshak Geghamyan (ARM)	2
Ahmet Eremekter (TUR)	6
Riccardo Bufis (ITA)	2
Viachaslau Fedaryna (AIN)	7^{F}
Hristomir Pironkov (BUL)	0
Luka Gabisonia (GEO)	4
Branko Đukić (SRB)	6
Maksim Averin (AIN)	5
Yehor Yakushenko (UKR)	8

Quarterfinals
Sebastian Warchoł (POL)	9
Ionuț Manolache (ROU)	0
Hunor Kudelász (HUN)	0
Darius Kiefer (GER)	9
Ahmet Eremekter (TUR)	4
Viachaslau Fedaryna (AIN)	0
Branko Đukić (SRB)	1
Yehor Yakushenko (UKR)	3

Semifinals
Sebastian Warchoł (POL)	1
Darius Kiefer (GER)	1
Ahmet Eremekter (TUR)	0
Yehor Yakushenko (UKR)	8

Final
Darius Kiefer (GER)	1
Yehor Yakushenko (UKR)	1

Repechage round
Arshak Geghamyan (ARM)	13
Hunor Kudelász (HUN)	10
Maksim Averin (AIN)	5
Branko Đukić (SRB)	3

Bronze medals
Arshak Geghamyan (ARM)	6
Sebastian Warchoł (POL)	10
Maksim Averin (AIN)	7
Ahmet Eremekter (TUR)	3

== Men's Greco-Roman 130 kg ==
1 and 2 July

Legend

- F — Won by fall

Main bracket

Round of 16
Artur Sarkisjan (CZE)	9
Leonhard Junger (AUT)	1
Aramayis Harutyunyan (ARM)	5
Marko Šupić (SRB)	2
Pijus Baldyšius (LTU)	2
Marko Milanović (CRO)	10
Rafail Gkirnis (GRE)	0
Cemal Yusuf Bakır (TUR)	11
Daniil Kazlou (AIN)	0
Dmytro Stryzhekozin (UKR)	3
László Darabos (HUN)	3
Timofei Bogdanov (AIN)	5
Mazaim Mardanov (AZE)	1
Saba Chilashvili (GEO)	1
Andrej Malchun (GER)	1
Alan Dzabiev (BUL)	5

Quarterfinals
Artur Sarkisjan (CZE)	0
Aramayis Harutyunyan (ARM)	9
Marko Milanović (CRO)	0
Cemal Yusuf Bakır (TUR)	3
Dmytro Stryzhekozin (UKR)	1
Timofei Bogdanov (AIN)	1
Saba Chilashvili (GEO)	1
Alan Dzabiev (BUL)	1

Semifinals
Aramayis Harutyunyan (ARM)	1
Cemal Yusuf Bakır (TUR)	3
Dmytro Stryzhekozin (UKR)	1
Saba Chilashvili (GEO)	1

Final
Cemal Yusuf Bakır (TUR)	1
Saba Chilashvili (GEO)	1

Repechage round
Rafail Gkirnis (GRE)	0
Marko Milanović (CRO)	9
Mazaim Mardanov (AZE)	0
Alan Dzabiev (BUL)	9

Bronze medals
Marko Milanović (CRO)	9
Aramayis Harutyunyan (ARM)	4
Alan Dzabiev (BUL)	3
Dmytro Stryzhekozin (UKR)	1

== See also ==
- 2024 European U20 Wrestling Championships – Men's freestyle
- 2024 European U20 Wrestling Championships – Women's freestyle
- 2024 European U17 Wrestling Championships
