= 2024 European U20 Wrestling Championships – Women's freestyle =

The Women's Freestyle competitions at the 2024 European U20 Wrestling Championships were held alongside the U17 Championships in Novi Sad, Serbia between 3 and 5 July 2024.

== Women's freestyle 50 kg ==
3 and 4 July

Legend

- F — Won by fall

Final

Final
Aida Kerymova (UKR)	7
Svenja Jungo (SUI)	0

Top half

Round of 32
Letícia Loureiro (POR)	0
Bianka Fáth (HUN)	10^{F}

Round of 16
Olivia van Kleunen (NED)	0
Nicoleta Băjan (ROU)	11
Bianka Fáth (HUN)	0
Aida Kerymova (UKR)	10
Sviatlana Katenka (AIN)	7^{F}
Marija Spirkovska (MKD)	1
Fatma Kızmaz (TUR)	1
Violetta Biriukova (AIN)	2

Quarterfinals
Nicoleta Băjan (ROU)	0
Aida Kerymova (UKR)	10^{F}
Sviatlana Katenka (AIN)	3
Violetta Biriukova (AIN)	10

Semifinals
Aida Kerymova (UKR)	2^{F}
Violetta Biriukova (AIN)	0

Bottom half

Round of 32

Round of 16
Emine Osman (BUL)	0
Svenja Jungo (SUI)	2^{F}
Elvina Karimzada (AZE)	6
Joanna Samsonowicz (POL)	4
Marina Karapanagiotidou (GRE)	0
María Cazalla (ESP)	6^{F}
Juliette Lescure (FRA)	0
Roberta Luostarinen (FIN)	4

Quarterfinals
Svenja Jungo (SUI)	3^{F}
Elvina Karimzada (AZE)	4
María Cazalla (ESP)	2
Roberta Luostarinen (FIN)	10

Semifinals
Svenja Jungo (SUI)	8
Roberta Luostarinen (FIN)	4

Repechage round 2
Bianka Fáth (HUN)	0
Nicoleta Băjan (ROU)	12
Emine Osman (BUL)	3
Elvina Karimzada (AZE)	6

Bronze medal match
Nicoleta Băjan (ROU)	2
Violetta Biriukova (AIN)	13
Elvina Karimzada (AZE)	0
Roberta Luostarinen (FIN)	10

== Women's freestyle 53 kg ==
4 and 5 July

Legend

- F — Won by fall
- R — Retired
- WO — Won by walkover

Main bracket

Round of 16
Olga Ovchinnikova (AIN)	10
Réka Hegedüs (SVK)	0
Ilona Valchuk (POL)	10
Maëlyss Rousselet (FRA)	1
Valeryia Mikitsich (AIN)	2^{F}
Nikol Aleksandrova (BUL)	0
Carla Jaume (ESP)	3^{F}
Ana Maria Rotaru (ROU)	4
Lena Ećimović (SRB)	4
Sofiia Marchenko (UKR)	5^{F}
Şevval Çayır (TUR)	8
Fabiana Rinella (ITA)	6
Asmar Jankurtaran (AZE)	10
Liliána Kapuvári (HUN)	13^{F}
Gabriela Secrieru (MDA)	4^{F}
Eleni Kolozi (GRE)	0

Quarterfinals
Olga Ovchinnikova (AIN)	10
Ilona Valchuk (POL)	0
Valeryia Mikitsich (AIN)	3
Carla Jaume (ESP)	8
Sofiia Marchenko (UKR)	1
Şevval Çayır (TUR)	6^{R}
Liliána Kapuvári (HUN)	8^{F}
Gabriela Secrieru (MDA)	5

Semifinals
Olga Ovchinnikova (AIN)	13
Carla Jaume (ESP)	2
Sofiia Marchenko (UKR)	9^{F}
Liliána Kapuvári (HUN)	6

Final
Olga Ovchinnikova (AIN)	8
Sofiia Marchenko (UKR)	1

Repechage round
Réka Hegedüs (SVK)	2
Ilona Valchuk (POL)	2^{F}
Lena Ećimović (SRB)	WO
Şevval Çayır (TUR)

Bronze medals
Ilona Valchuk (POL)	1
Carla Jaume (ESP)	6
Lena Ećimović (SRB)	0
Liliána Kapuvári (HUN)	10

== Women's freestyle 55 kg ==
3 and 4 July

Legend

- F — Won by fall

Main bracket

Round of 16
Svea Reichmann (GER)	2
Milica Sekulović (SRB)	12
Nesrin Syuleymanova (BUL)	0
Tuba Demir (TUR)	10
Mariia Nemish (UKR)	10
Elisa Duce (ITA)	0
Nikola Wiśniewska (POL)	2
Marta Hetmanava (AIN)	11
Nargiz Samadova (AZE)	7
Olga Zakrzewska (NED)	3
Anja Epp (SUI)	0
Felicitas Domajeva (NOR)	5
Ekaterina Chikanova (AIN)	10
Laura Fáth (HUN)	0

Quarterfinals
Alexandra Voiculescu (ROU)	9
Milica Sekulović (SRB)	13
Tuba Demir (TUR)	5^{F}
Mariia Nemish (UKR)	0
Marta Hetmanava (AIN)	10
Nargiz Samadova (AZE)	0
Felicitas Domajeva (NOR)	0
Ekaterina Chikanova (AIN)	6

Semifinals
Milica Sekulović (SRB)	0
Tuba Demir (TUR)	10
Marta Hetmanava (AIN)	2
Ekaterina Chikanova (AIN)	1

Final
Tuba Demir (TUR)	15^{F}
Marta Hetmanava (AIN)	6

Repechage round
Nesrin Syuleymanova (BUL)	3
Mariia Nemish (UKR)	6
Nikola Wiśniewska (POL)	0
Nargiz Samadova (AZE)	4^{F}

Bronze medals
Mariia Nemish (UKR)	8
Milica Sekulović (SRB)	20
Nargiz Samadova (AZE)	1
Ekaterina Chikanova (AIN)	8

== Women's freestyle 57 kg ==
4 and 5 July

Legend

- F — Won by fall

Final

Final
Volha Hardzei (AIN)	0
Alina Filipovych (UKR)	10

Top half

Round of 32
Asia Craparotta (ITA)	4
Lara Görcs (SVK)	4

Round of 16
Jana Petrović (SRB)	1
Volha Hardzei (AIN)	12
Lara Görcs (SVK)	5
Romaïssa El Kharroubi (FRA)	3
Georgiana Lircă (ROU)	7
Tindra Dalmyr (SWE)	4
Gerda Terék (HUN)	6
Viktoria Boynova (BUL)	4

Quarterfinals
Volha Hardzei (AIN)	5^{F}
Lara Görcs (SVK)	1
Georgiana Lircă (ROU)	1
Gerda Terék (HUN)	3

Semifinals
Volha Hardzei (AIN)	5
Gerda Terék (HUN)	2

Bottom half

Round of 32
Inna Alimova (LTU)	4
Amelia Tomala (POL)	2

Round of 16
Marie Trayer (GER)	4
Gülsüm Bingöl (TUR)	4
Gular Habibova (AZE)	10
Marija Cvetanova (MKD)	2
Dolzhon Tsyngueva (AIN)	9
Inna Alimova (LTU)	6
Alina Filipovych (UKR)	10
Petra Mráčková (CZE)	0

Quarterfinals
Marie Trayer (GER)	4
Gular Habibova (AZE)	1
Dolzhon Tsyngueva (AIN)	0
Alina Filipovych (UKR)	10

Semifinals
Marie Trayer (GER)	0
Alina Filipovych (UKR)	4^{F}

Repechage round
Jana Petrović (SRB)	2
Lara Görcs (SVK)	1
Petra Mráčková (CZE)	0
Dolzhon Tsyngueva (AIN)	11

Bronze medals
Jana Petrović (SRB)	0
Gerda Terék (HUN)	10
Dolzhon Tsyngueva (AIN)	7
Marie Trayer (GER)	7

== Women's freestyle 59 kg ==
3 and 4 July

Legend

- F — Won by fall

Main bracket

Round of 16
Anna Tieliegina (LTU)	11^{F}
Mădălina Prisacari (MDA)	0
Ruzanna Mammadova (AZE)	12
Luna Rothenberger (GER)	2
Ana Maria Puiu (ROU)	7
Mariia Miziurko (UKR)	0
Anđela Cvetković (SRB)	4
Desislava Ivanova (BUL)	2^{F}
Sevim Akbaş (TUR)	5
Immacolata Danise (ITA)	4
Emilia Świerczewska (POL)	0
Elena Kurova (AIN)	2^{F}
Viktória Borsos (HUN)	5
Rosa Molina (ESP)	0

Quarterfinals
Uladzislava Kudzin (AIN)	3
Anna Tieliegina (LTU)	6
Ruzanna Mammadova (AZE)	3^{F}
Ana Maria Puiu (ROU)	0
Desislava Ivanova (BUL)	6
Sevim Akbaş (TUR)	13^{F}
Elena Kurova (AIN)	10^{F}
Viktória Borsos (HUN)	0

Semifinals
Anna Tieliegina (LTU)	5
Ruzanna Mammadova (AZE)	9
Sevim Akbaş (TUR)	0
Elena Kurova (AIN)	4^{F}

Final
Ruzanna Mammadova (AZE)	14
Elena Kurova (AIN)	10

Repechage round
Luna Rothenberger (GER)	2
Ana Maria Puiu (ROU)	13
Emilia Świerczewska (POL)	0
Viktória Borsos (HUN)	6^{F}

Bronze medals
Ana Maria Puiu (ROU)	6
Anna Tieliegina (LTU)	4
Viktória Borsos (HUN)	5
Sevim Akbaş (TUR)	7

== Women's freestyle 62 kg ==
4 and 5 July

Legend

- F — Won by fall

Main bracket

Round of 16
Tereza Mračková (CZE)	6
Mirijam Hansen (NOR)	12
Nicola Wasilewska (POL)	0
Annatina Lippuner (SUI)	5^{F}
Emel Mustafova (BUL)	1
Mirella Páli (HUN)	4^{F}
Naemi Leistner (GER)	0
Iryna Bondar (UKR)	10
Amelia Samuelsson (SWE)	4^{F}
Elena Nicolodi (ITA)	0
Marharyta Koush (AIN)	6
Anna Fotiadou (GRE)	8^{F}
Jovana Radivojević (SRB)	0
Olga Iatsenko (AIN)	12

Quarterfinals
Dilan Tan (TUR)	5
Mirijam Hansen (NOR)	2^{F}
Annatina Lippuner (SUI)	8^{F}
Mirella Páli (HUN)	0
Iryna Bondar (UKR)	10
Amelia Samuelsson (SWE)	0
Anna Fotiadou (GRE)	1
Olga Iatsenko (AIN)	10^{F}

Semifinals
Mirijam Hansen (NOR)	2
Annatina Lippuner (SUI)	11^{F}
Iryna Bondar (UKR)	8^{F}
Olga Iatsenko (AIN)	0

Final
Annatina Lippuner (SUI)	0
Iryna Bondar (UKR)	10

Repechage round
Nicola Wasilewska (POL)	3
Mirella Páli (HUN)	2
Naemi Leistner (GER)	0
Amelia Samuelsson (SWE)	10

Bronze medals
Nicola Wasilewska (POL)	3
Mirijam Hansen (NOR)	0
Amelia Samuelsson (SWE)	8
Olga Iatsenko (AIN)	7

== Women's freestyle 65 kg ==
4 and 5 July

Legend

- F — Won by fall
- WO — Won by walkover

Main bracket

Round of 16
Nikoleta Barmpa (GRE)	10
Iveta Česnauskaitė (LTU)	6
Enikő Elekes (HUN)	10
Ana-Maria Crețu (MDA)	0
Gergana Stoyanova (BUL)	5
Aliaksandra Zhuk (AIN)	6
Melina Samsonsen (NOR)	1
Alicja Nowosad (POL)	12
Margarita Salnazarian (AIN)	11
Cassidy Richter (GER)	0
Viorica Adam (ROU)	0
Iryna Borysiuk (UKR)	8^{F}
Maša Perović (SRB)	6
Viktória Földešiová (SVK)	5
Bianca Contrafatto (ITA)	0
Beyza Nur Akkuş (TUR)	2^{F}

Quarterfinals
Nikoleta Barmpa (GRE)	4
Enikő Elekes (HUN)	14
Aliaksandra Zhuk (AIN)	0
Alicja Nowosad (POL)	10
Margarita Salnazarian (AIN)	8
Iryna Borysiuk (UKR)	3
Maša Perović (SRB)	0
Beyza Nur Akkuş (TUR)	10^{F}

Semifinals
Enikő Elekes (HUN)	5
Alicja Nowosad (POL)	1
Margarita Salnazarian (AIN)	3
Beyza Nur Akkuş (TUR)	3

Final
Enikő Elekes (HUN)	10
Beyza Nur Akkuş (TUR)	0

Repechage round
Ana-Maria Crețu (MDA)	WO
Nikoleta Barmpa (GRE)
Bianca Contrafatto (ITA)	9
Maša Perović (SRB)	0

Bronze medals
Ana-Maria Crețu (MDA)	0
Alicja Nowosad (POL)	10
Bianca Contrafatto (ITA)	0
Margarita Salnazarian (AIN)	4^{F}

== Women's freestyle 68 kg ==
3 and 4 July

Legend

- F — Won by fall

Main bracket

Round of 16
Ayşe Erkan (TUR)	10
Emma Carri (ITA)	0
Alina Shevchenko (AIN)	11
Fatima Isayeva (AZE)	0
Laura Köhler (GER)	0
Karolina Domaszuk (POL)	11
Fruzsina Terék (HUN)	0
Maria Panțîru (ROU)	6^{F}
Alina Shauchuk (AIN)	10
Drosoula Tzianakopoulou (GRE)	0
Oleksandra Rybak (UKR)	10
Wilma Hoffman (SWE)	0
Daniela Brasnarova (BUL)	1
Emilija Jakovljević (SRB)	5

Quarterfinals
Luciana Beda (MDA)	0
Ayşe Erkan (TUR)	11
Alina Shevchenko (AIN)	10
Karolina Domaszuk (POL)	0
Maria Panțîru (ROU)	0
Alina Shauchuk (AIN)	10
Oleksandra Rybak (UKR)	10
Emilija Jakovljević (SRB)	0

Semifinals
Ayşe Erkan (TUR)	2
Alina Shevchenko (AIN)	13
Alina Shauchuk (AIN)	8
Oleksandra Rybak (UKR)	2

Final
Alina Shevchenko (AIN)	5
Alina Shauchuk (AIN)	0

Repechage round
Fatima Isayeva (AZE)	0
Karolina Domaszuk (POL)	10
Drosoula Tzianakopoulou (GRE)	2
Maria Panțîru (ROU)	2^{F}

Bronze medals
Karolina Domaszuk (POL)	0
Ayşe Erkan (TUR)	10
Maria Panțîru (ROU)	7^{F}
Oleksandra Rybak (UKR)	3

== Women's freestyle 72 kg ==
4 and 5 July

Legend

- F — Won by fall

Main bracket

Round of 16
Evelin Ujhelji (SRB)	0
Viktoryia Radzkova (AIN)	10
Ambre Chevreau (FRA)	7^{F}
Yasmín Alonso (ESP)	3
Georgiana Andrieş (ROU)	0
Gia Kastelan (CRO)	10
Nadiia Sokolovska (UKR)	10
Vanesa Georgieva (BUL)	6
Fabiana Dattilo (ITA)	0
Kristina Bratchikova (AIN)	4^{F}
Bükrenaz Sert (TUR)	8
Karolina Jaworska (POL)	4

Quarterfinals
Noémi Osváth-Nagy (HUN)	0
Viktoryia Radzkova (AIN)	7
Ambre Chevreau (FRA)	2
Gia Kastelan (CRO)	4^{F}
Nadiia Sokolovska (UKR)	10
Kristina Bratchikova (AIN)	2
Bükrenaz Sert (TUR)	12
Elvira Ersson (SWE)	4

Semifinals
Viktoryia Radzkova (AIN)	11
Gia Kastelan (CRO)	0
Nadiia Sokolovska (UKR)	10
Bükrenaz Sert (TUR)	8^{F}

Final
Viktoryia Radzkova (AIN)	11^{F}
Bükrenaz Sert (TUR)	2

Repechage round
Evelin Ujhelji (SRB)	3
Noémi Osváth-Nagy (HUN)	8^{F}
Karolina Jaworska (POL)	4
Elvira Ersson (SWE)	15^{F}

Bronze medals
Noémi Osváth-Nagy (HUN)	10
Gia Kastelan (CRO)	3
Elvira Ersson (SWE)	0
Nadiia Sokolovska (UKR)	4^{F}

== Women's freestyle 76 kg ==
3 and 4 July

Legend

- F — Won by fall

Main bracket

Round of 16
Veronika Nyikos (HUN)	6
Mariia Orlevych (UKR)	3
Anna Iodice (ITA)	0
Elmira Yasin (TUR)	10

Quarterfinals
Diana Titova (AIN)	10
Veronika Nyikos (HUN)	0
Ionela Cojocaru (ROU)	0
Patrycja Cuber (POL)	10
Lotta Englich (GER)	2
Aliaksandra Kazlova (AIN)	12
Elmira Yasin (TUR)	12
Milla Anđelić (CRO)	2

Semifinals
Diana Titova (AIN)	4^{F}
Patrycja Cuber (POL)	0
Aliaksandra Kazlova (AIN)	7
Elmira Yasin (TUR)	10

Final
Diana Titova (AIN)	10
Elmira Yasin (TUR)	5^{F}

Repechage round
Anna Iodice (ITA)	0
Milla Anđelić (CRO)	4^{F}

Bronze medals
Veronika Nyikos (HUN)	10
Patrycja Cuber (POL)	0
Milla Anđelić (CRO)	2
Aliaksandra Kazlova (AIN)	12

== See also ==
- 2024 European U20 Wrestling Championships – Men's freestyle
- 2024 European U20 Wrestling Championships – Men's Greco-Roman
- 2024 European U17 Wrestling Championships
