= 2024 European U20 Wrestling Championships – Men's freestyle =

The Men's Freestyle competitions at the 2024 European U20 Wrestling Championships were held alongside the U17 Championships in Novi Sad, Serbia between 5 and 7 July 2024.

== Men's freestyle 57 kg ==
5 and 6 July

Legend

- F — Won by fall

Final

Final
Vasif Baghirov (AZE)	6
Lev Pavlov (AIN)	8

Top half

Round of 32
Rene Talts (EST)	11
Artiomij Boguslavskij (LTU)	0
Dimitrios Oflidis (GRE)	11
John Keterling (GER)	5

Round of 16
Vasif Baghirov (AZE)	11
Rassoul Galbouraev (FRA)	0
Rene Talts (EST)	0
Károly Baráth (HUN)	8
Herbert Akapian (AIN)	10
Dimitrios Oflidis (GRE)	0
Stone Perlungher (SUI)	3
Ion Bulgaru (MDA)	11

Quarterfinals
Vasif Baghirov (AZE)	4^{F}
Károly Baráth (HUN)	0
Herbert Akapian (AIN)	10
Ion Bulgaru (MDA)	0

Semifinals
Vasif Baghirov (AZE)	10
Herbert Akapian (AIN)	3

Bottom half

Round of 32
Dmytro Kudriavtsev (UKR)	11
Mehmet Usinov (MKD)	0
Murad Ilyaz (BUL)	0
Nika Zangaladze (GEO)	4^{F}

Round of 16
Rafał Szewc (POL)	10
Patrik Skácel (SVK)	0
Dmytro Kudriavtsev (UKR)	0
Hayko Gasparyan (ARM)	10
Melik Gümüş (TUR)	6
Nika Zangaladze (GEO)	17
Lev Pavlov (AIN)	10
Carmine Caiazza (ITA)	0

Quarterfinals
Rafał Szewc (POL)	0
Hayko Gasparyan (ARM)	10
Nika Zangaladze (GEO)	7
Lev Pavlov (AIN)	8

Semifinals
Hayko Gasparyan (ARM)	1
Lev Pavlov (AIN)	4

Repechage round 2
Rassoul Galbouraev (FRA)	5^{F}
Károly Baráth (HUN)	2
Carmine Caiazza (ITA)	0
Nika Zangaladze (GEO)	10

Bronze medal match
Rassoul Galbouraev (FRA)	3
Herbert Akapian (AIN)	1
Nika Zangaladze (GEO)	4
Hayko Gasparyan (ARM)	10

== Men's freestyle 61 kg ==
6 and 7 July

Legend

- F — Won by fall

Final

Final
Jamal Abbasov (AZE)	1
Andrei Midlovets (AIN)	6

Top half

Round of 32
Pasquale Liuzzi (ITA)	2
Jamal Abbasov (AZE)	7

Round of 16
Balázs Rácz (HUN)	1
Dzianis Katok (AIN)	12
Jamal Abbasov (AZE)	10
Róbert Meszároš (SVK)	0
Arbi Alarkhanov (BEL)	8
Marc Arias (ESP)	11
Tolga Özbek (TUR)	10
Arben Sejdi (MKD)	0

Quarterfinals
Dzianis Katok (AIN)	0
Jamal Abbasov (AZE)	10^{F}
Marc Arias (ESP)	0
Tolga Özbek (TUR)	10

Semifinals
Jamal Abbasov (AZE)	5
Tolga Özbek (TUR)	1

Bottom half

Round of 32
Tornike Asabashvili (GEO)	8
Denis Naim (BUL)	0

Round of 16
Jannis Rebholz (GER)	2
Andrei Midlovets (AIN)	12
Vasili Lazarev (MDA)	13
Bartosz Lis (POL)	6
Artavazd Harutyunyan (ARM)	5
Tornike Asabashvili (GEO)	6
Janar Lips (EST)	1
Viktor Borohan (UKR)	8

Quarterfinals
Andrei Midlovets (AIN)	10
Vasili Lazarev (MDA)	0
Tornike Asabashvili (GEO)	2
Viktor Borohan (UKR)	12^{F}

Semifinals
Andrei Midlovets (AIN)	10
Viktor Borohan (UKR)	0

Repechage round 1
Pasquale Liuzzi (ITA)	4
Róbert Meszároš (SVK)	5

Repechage round 2
Róbert Meszároš (SVK)	12
Dzianis Katok (AIN)	1
Jannis Rebholz (GER)	3
Vasili Lazarev (MDA)	8

Bronze medal match
Róbert Meszároš (SVK)	4
Tolga Özbek (TUR)	12
Vasili Lazarev (MDA)	0
Viktor Borohan (UKR)	12

== Men's freestyle 65 kg ==
5 and 6 July

Legend

- F — Won by fall

Final

Final
Abdullah Toprak (TUR)	3
Adam Arkhiev (AIN)	2

Top half

Round of 32
Khizir Dasiyev (FRA)	10
Marian Sandu (ROU)	0

Round of 16
Musa Verdiyev (AZE)	5
Dominik Jagusz (POL)	2
Khizir Dasiyev (FRA)	10
Ainis Kuļikovskis (LAT)	0
Abdullah Toprak (TUR)	12
Valentyn Hryhoryshyn (UKR)	0
Oleg Kniševskij (LTU)	0
Zurab Abalaki (GEO)	10

Quarterfinals
Musa Verdiyev (AZE)	3
Khizir Dasiyev (FRA)	7
Abdullah Toprak (TUR)	12
Zurab Abalaki (GEO)	0

Semifinals
Khizir Dasiyev (FRA)	0
Abdullah Toprak (TUR)	11

Bottom half

Round of 32
Luca Hartmann (AUT)	1
Serghei Cîlcic (MDA)	14
Alessandro Nini (ITA)	13
Zoltán Mizsei (HUN)	3

Round of 16
Dzmitry Shvarts (AIN)	0
Andranik Avetisyan (ARM)	10
Serghei Cîlcic (MDA)	10
Erdal Galip (BUL)	0
Marcel Wagin (GER)	2
Alessandro Nini (ITA)	6
Felipe Ferrusola (ESP)	2
Adam Arkhiev (AIN)	12

Quarterfinals
Andranik Avetisyan (ARM)	10
Serghei Cîlcic (MDA)	0
Alessandro Nini (ITA)	1
Adam Arkhiev (AIN)	4

Semifinals
Andranik Avetisyan (ARM)	0
Adam Arkhiev (AIN)	11

Repechage round 2
Valentyn Hryhoryshyn (UKR)	13
Zurab Abalaki (GEO)	1
Felipe Ferrusola (ESP)	0
Alessandro Nini (ITA)	11

Bronze medal match
Valentyn Hryhoryshyn (UKR)	3
Khizir Dasiyev (FRA)	2
Alessandro Nini (ITA)	9
Andranik Avetisyan (ARM)	6

== Men's freestyle 70 kg ==
5 and 6 July

Legend

- F — Won by fall

Final

Final
Magomed Baitukaev (AIN)	10
Alexandr Gaidarli (MDA)	0

Top half

Round of 32
Alex Gombos (HUN)	7
Joona Hakola (FIN)	4
Magomed Baitukaev (AIN)	10
Alexander Seiwald (AUT)	0

Round of 16
Umut Erdoğan (TUR)	0
Goga Otinashvili (GEO)	10
Alex Gombos (HUN)	12
Aliaksandr Kambayeu (AIN)	9
Samuel Sedlák (SVK)	0
Magomed Baitukaev (AIN)	11
Daniel Korkin (ISR)	2
Vladimir Azaryan (ARM)	12

Quarterfinals
Goga Otinashvili (GEO)	10^{F}
Alex Gombos (HUN)	0
Magomed Baitukaev (AIN)	9
Vladimir Azaryan (ARM)	1

Semifinals
Goga Otinashvili (GEO)	0
Magomed Baitukaev (AIN)	10

Bottom half

Round of 32
Daniele Gubbiotti (ITA)	0
Alexandr Gaidarli (MDA)	10
Zelimkhan Mutsukhaev (POL)	2
Ramik Heybatov (AZE)	3

Round of 16
Maksym Tverdokhlib (UKR)	10
~~Ognjen Todosijević (SRB)~~	0
Alexandr Gaidarli (MDA)	10
Kaloyan Atanasov (BUL)	0
Georgios Ioakeimidis (GRE)	1
Ramik Heybatov (AZE)	3
Rostislav Leicht (GER)	5
Denis Kodakov (ESP)	0

Quarterfinals
Maksym Tverdokhlib (UKR)	0
Alexandr Gaidarli (MDA)	10
Ramik Heybatov (AZE)	2
Rostislav Leicht (GER)	3

Semifinals
Alexandr Gaidarli (MDA)	10
Rostislav Leicht (GER)	0

Repechage round 1
Alexander Seiwald (AUT)	10
Samuel Sedlák (SVK)	0
Daniele Gubbiotti (ITA)	4
Kaloyan Atanasov (BUL)	15

Repechage round 2
Alexander Seiwald (AUT)	0
Vladimir Azaryan (ARM)	11
Kaloyan Atanasov (BUL)	1
Maksym Tverdokhlib (UKR)	8

Bronze medal match
Vladimir Azaryan (ARM)	2
Goga Otinashvili (GEO)	9
Maksym Tverdokhlib (UKR)	1
Rostislav Leicht (GER)	3

== Men's freestyle 74 kg ==
6 and 7 July

Legend

- F — Won by fall

Final

Final
Vadym Tsurkan (UKR)	12
Giorgi Gogritchiani (GEO)	11

Top half

Round of 32
Ahmad Ahmadli (AZE)	1
Metehan Yaprak (TUR)	4

Round of 16
Micah Naisbet (GBR)	0
Vadym Tsurkan (UKR)	11
Metehan Yaprak (TUR)	7
Muslim Makhmudau (AIN)	1
Raul Caso (ITA)	3
Vlad Stratan (MDA)	1
Narek Nikoghosyan (ARM)	0
Tamir Eshinimaev (AIN)	4

Quarterfinals
Vadym Tsurkan (UKR)	8
Metehan Yaprak (TUR)	0
Raul Caso (ITA)	3
Tamir Eshinimaev (AIN)	4

Semifinals
Vadym Tsurkan (UKR)	3
Tamir Eshinimaev (AIN)	1

Bottom half

Round of 32
Theocharis Kougioumtsidis (GRE)	11
Ádám Gazdag (HUN)	3
Nikolai Tarassov (EST)	5
Stiliyan Dzhorov (BUL)	13

Round of 16
Marat Kardanov (GER)	14
Muhamed Bektemirov (AUT)	4
Theocharis Kougioumtsidis (GRE)	0
Seyfulla Itaev (FRA)	7
Antoni Majchrzak (POL)	16
Stiliyan Dzhorov (BUL)	15
Giorgi Gogritchiani (GEO)	10
Marian Subțirică (ROU)	0

Quarterfinals
Marat Kardanov (GER)	0
Seyfulla Itaev (FRA)	11
Antoni Majchrzak (POL)	0
Giorgi Gogritchiani (GEO)	10

Semifinals
Seyfulla Itaev (FRA)	4
Giorgi Gogritchiani (GEO)	8

Repechage round 2
Micah Naisbet (GBR)	0
Metehan Yaprak (TUR)	11
Marian Subțirică (ROU)	6^{F}
Antoni Majchrzak (POL)	0

Bronze medal match
Metehan Yaprak (TUR)	3
Tamir Eshinimaev (AIN)	3
Marian Subțirică (ROU)	3
Seyfulla Itaev (FRA)	6

== Men's freestyle 79 kg ==
5 and 6 July

Legend

- F — Won by fall
- WO — Won by walkover

Final

Final
Cengizhan Doğan (TUR)
Said Saidulov (AIN)	WO

Top half

Round of 32
Ion Laurențiu Marcu (MDA)	0
Bartłomiej Nowakowski (POL)	10

Round of 16
Tristan Aleksandrov (EST)	8^{F}
Darragh Love (GBR)	0
Bartłomiej Nowakowski (POL)	0
Dzmitry Lukashuk (AIN)	8
Nurudin Magomedgadzhiev (AZE)	1
Cengizhan Doğan (TUR)	4
Paulius Leščauskas (LTU)	8
Radomir Stoyanov (BUL)	4

Quarterfinals
Tristan Aleksandrov (EST)	3
Dzmitry Lukashuk (AIN)	4
Cengizhan Doğan (TUR)	3
Paulius Leščauskas (LTU)	1

Semifinals
Dzmitry Lukashuk (AIN)	0
Cengizhan Doğan (TUR)	11

Bottom half

Round of 32
Nick Scherrer (SUI)	0
Bohdan Oleksiienko (UKR)	10

Round of 16
Nándor Hajduch (HUN)	6
Adam Kakhriev (FRA)	16
Omer Barak (ISR)	0
Said Saidulov (AIN)	10
Gregor Eigenbrodt (GER)	8^{F}
Bohdan Oleksiienko (UKR)	2
Aren Israyelyan (ARM)	10
Davit Tchetchelashvili (GEO)	0

Quarterfinals
Adam Kakhriev (FRA)	0
Said Saidulov (AIN)	10
Gregor Eigenbrodt (GER)	4
Aren Israyelyan (ARM)	5

Semifinals
Said Saidulov (AIN)	5
Aren Israyelyan (ARM)	2

Repechage round 2
Nurudin Magomedgadzhiev (AZE)	4
Paulius Leščauskas (LTU)	7
Omer Barak (ISR)	2
Adam Kakhriev (FRA)	8

Bronze medals
Paulius Leščauskas (LTU)	4
Dzmitry Lukashuk (AIN)	3
Adam Kakhriev (FRA)	4
Aren Israyelyan (ARM)	3

== Men's freestyle 86 kg ==
6 and 7 July

Legend

- F — Won by fall

Final

Final
Ibragim Kadiev (AIN)	9
Sadig Mustafazade (AZE)	1

Top half

Round of 32
Gabriele Niccolini (ITA)	10
Péter Zsivnovszki (HUN)	0
Anton Vyhivskyi (SVK)	2
Tamaz Nikoleishvili (GEO)	7

Round of 16
Mohammad Umkhadjiev (FRA)	2
Razmik Yepremyan (ARM)	4
Gabriele Niccolini (ITA)	10
Igor Szucki (POL)	0
Ibragim Kadiev (AIN)	10
Tamaz Nikoleishvili (GEO)	0
Daniel Fischer (GER)	2
Ahmet Yağan (TUR)	7

Quarterfinals
Razmik Yepremyan (ARM)	0
Gabriele Niccolini (ITA)	7
Ibragim Kadiev (AIN)	16
Ahmet Yağan (TUR)	6

Semifinals
Gabriele Niccolini (ITA)	0
Ibragim Kadiev (AIN)	10

Bottom half

Round of 32
Umar Veliev (BEL)	10
Slavi Stamenov (BUL)	0
Sadig Mustafazade (AZE)	10
Tomer Drozhniak (ISR)	0

Round of 16
Noah Schwaller (SUI)	0
Alexandru Borș (MDA)	12
Umar Veliev (BEL)	10
Panagiotis Polychronidis (GRE)	0
Pavlo Vaskovskyi (UKR)	2
Sadig Mustafazade (AZE)	12
Aliaksei Kulakou (AIN)	9^{F}
Vladislav Rjabtsev (EST)	0

Quarterfinals
Alexandru Borș (MDA)	9
Umar Veliev (BEL)	0
Sadig Mustafazade (AZE)	6
Aliaksei Kulakou (AIN)	5

Semifinals
Alexandru Borș (MDA)	7
Sadig Mustafazade (AZE)	9

Repechage round 1
Tomer Drozhniak (ISR)	0
Pavlo Vaskovskyi (UKR)	10

Repechage round 2
Tamaz Nikoleishvili (GEO)	1
Ahmet Yağan (TUR)	4
Pavlo Vaskovskyi (UKR)	12
Aliaksei Kulakou (AIN)	2

Bronze medal match
Ahmet Yağan (TUR)	8
Gabriele Niccolini (ITA)	10
Pavlo Vaskovskyi (UKR)	0
Alexandru Borș (MDA)	4

== Men's freestyle 92 kg ==
6 and 7 July

Legend

- F — Won by fall

Final

Final
Anar Jafarli (AZE)	2
Mustafagadzhi Malachdibirov (AIN)	12

Top half

Round of 32
Vadzim Bandarkou (AIN)	9
Nikita Goubarets (ISR)	4

Round of 16
Anar Jafarli (AZE)	12
Vassilj Guccini (ITA)	0
Vadzim Bandarkou (AIN)	7
Ilija Atanasov (MKD)	1
Sali Saliev (BUL)	11
Erdogan Güzey (GER)	0
David Jakšík (SVK)	1
Papin Hunanyan (ARM)	8

Quarterfinals
Anar Jafarli (AZE)	8
Vadzim Bandarkou (AIN)	0
Sali Saliev (BUL)	11
Papin Hunanyan (ARM)	1

Semifinals
Anar Jafarli (AZE)	11
Sali Saliev (BUL)	0

Bottom half

Round of 32
Konstantine Petriashvili (GEO)	14
Grigori Tomailî (MDA)	3
Ashab Dadaev (FRA)	6
Armanis Barsamyan (LTU)	6^{F}

Round of 16
Nikolaos Karavanos (GRE)	6
Musza Arsunkaev (HUN)	17
Konstantine Petriashvili (GEO)	0
Mustafagadzhi Malachdibirov (AIN)	10^{F}
Filip Szucki (POL)	10
Armanis Barsamyan (LTU)	0
Alperen Atar (TUR)	6
Mykyta Svyrydovskyi (UKR)	2

Quarterfinals
Musza Arsunkaev (HUN)	1
Mustafagadzhi Malachdibirov (AIN)	12
Filip Szucki (POL)	3
Alperen Atar (TUR)	11

Semifinals
Mustafagadzhi Malachdibirov (AIN)	7
Alperen Atar (TUR)	2

Repechage round 2
Vassilj Guccini (ITA)	1
Vadzim Bandarkou (AIN)	11
Konstantine Petriashvili (GEO)	5
Musza Arsunkaev (HUN)	7

Bronze medal match
Vadzim Bandarkou (AIN)	0
Sali Saliev (BUL)	10
Musza Arsunkaev (HUN)	9
Alperen Atar (TUR)	0

== Men's freestyle 97 kg ==
5 and 6 July

Legend

- F — Won by fall

Main bracket

Round of 16
Mikita Makarevich (AIN)	1
Ramini Gulitashvili (GEO)	9
Adam Jakšík (SVK)	0
Khetag Karsanov (AZE)	3
Constantin Buza (MDA)	9
Florin Tripon (ROU)	3
Bence Veress (HUN)	0
Shakhman Nukhaev (AIN)	10
Kostiantyn Zadoianchuk (UKR)	0
Rıfat Gıdak (TUR)	8

Quarterfinals
Angelo Aleo (ITA)	0
Ramini Gulitashvili (GEO)	13
Khetag Karsanov (AZE)	10
Constantin Buza (MDA)	0
Andriyan Valkanov (BUL)	2
Shakhman Nukhaev (AIN)	12
Rıfat Gıdak (TUR)	10
Taron Shahinyan (POL)	0

Semifinals
Ramini Gulitashvili (GEO)	0
Khetag Karsanov (AZE)	11
Shakhman Nukhaev (AIN)	8
Rıfat Gıdak (TUR)	4

Final
Khetag Karsanov (AZE)	5
Shakhman Nukhaev (AIN)	4

Repechage round
Adam Jakšík (SVK)	6
Constantin Buza (MDA)	2^{F}
Bence Veress (HUN)	16
Andriyan Valkanov (BUL)	5

Bronze medals
Constantin Buza (MDA)	2
Ramini Gulitashvili (GEO)	7
Bence Veress (HUN)	0
Rıfat Gıdak (TUR)	10

== Men's freestyle 125 kg ==
6 and 7 July

Legend

- F — Won by fall
- WO — Won by walkover

Main bracket

Round of 16
Hakan Büyükçıngıl (TUR)	11
Dian Manev (BUL)	0
Mateusz Pudłowski (POL)	0
Aleksandre Abramishvili (GEO)	10
Adolf Bazsó (HUN)	3
Nicolae Stratulat (MDA)	0
Khabib Davudgadzhiev (AIN)	11
Martino Piliero (ITA)	0
Yusif Dursunov (AZE)	4
Henrik Haykyan (ARM)	3
Ivan Myroshnychenko (UKR)	10
Teodor Gjorgiev (MKD)	0
Stsiapan Mandryk (AIN)	13
Ralfs Lukins (LAT)	0

Quarterfinals
Roope Kataja (FIN)	0
Hakan Büyükçıngıl (TUR)	11
Aleksandre Abramishvili (GEO)	WO
Adolf Bazsó (HUN)
Khabib Davudgadzhiev (AIN)	10
Yusif Dursunov (AZE)	2
Ivan Myroshnychenko (UKR)	6^{F}
Stsiapan Mandryk (AIN)	5

Semifinals
Hakan Büyükçıngıl (TUR)	7
Aleksandre Abramishvili (GEO)	2
Khabib Davudgadzhiev (AIN)	11
Ivan Myroshnychenko (UKR)	0

Final
Hakan Büyükçıngıl (TUR)	0
Khabib Davudgadzhiev (AIN)	5

Repechage round
Dian Manev (BUL)	7
Roope Kataja (FIN)	0
Martino Piliero (ITA)	0
Yusif Dursunov (AZE)	4^{F}

Bronze medals
Dian Manev (BUL)	0
Aleksandre Abramishvili (GEO)	10
Yusif Dursunov (AZE)	3
Ivan Myroshnychenko (UKR)	2

== See also ==
- 2024 European U20 Wrestling Championships – Men's Greco-Roman
- 2024 European U20 Wrestling Championships – Women's freestyle
- 2024 European U17 Wrestling Championships
