= 2024 European U17 & U20 Wrestling Championships =

2024 European U20 Championships
- Host city: Novi Sad, Serbia
- Dates: 1–7 July 2024
- Stadium: SPC Vojvodina

Champions
- Freestyle: Azerbaijan
- Greco-Roman: Turkey
- Women: Ukraine

2024 European U17 Championships
- Host city: Novi Sad, Serbia
- Dates: 24–30 June
- Stadium: SPC Vojvodina

Champions
- Freestyle: Azerbaijan
- Greco-Roman: Azerbaijan
- Women: Turkey

The 2024 European U17 & U20 Wrestling Championships is the 25th edition of European Cadets Wrestling Championship and 34th edition of European Juniors Wrestling Championships of combined events, and it was take place from 24 June to 7 July in Novi Sad, Serbia.

== U-20 ==
=== Medal table ===
* Host nation (Serbia)

Rank	Nation	Gold	Silver	Bronze	Total
–	Individual Neutral Athletes	13	8	10	31
1	Ukraine	5	1	4	10
2	Turkey	4	6	6	16
3	Azerbaijan	2	5	4	11
4	Georgia	2	2	5	9
5	Hungary	2	0	7	9
6	Sweden	1	1	1	3
7	Lithuania	1	0	1	2
8	Moldova	0	3	1	4
9	Switzerland	0	2	0	2
10	Armenia	0	1	3	4
11	Germany	0	1	1	2
12	France	0	0	3	3
12	Poland	0	0	3	3
14	Bulgaria	0	0	2	2
14	Italy	0	0	2	2
14	Romania	0	0	2	2
14	Serbia*	0	0	2	2
18	Croatia	0	0	1	1
18	Finland	0	0	1	1
18	Spain	0	0	1	1
Totals (20 entries)		30	30	60	120

=== Team ranking ===
Rank	Men's freestyle		Men's Greco-Roman		Women's freestyle	
Rank	Team	Points	Team	Points	Team	Points
1	Azerbaijan	132	Turkey	123	Ukraine	146
2	Turkey	125	Georgia	116	Turkey	124
3	Georgia	99	Azerbaijan	96	Hungary	109
4	Ukraine	95	Armenia	90	Poland	66
5	Moldova	67	Ukraine	80	Romania	52
6	France	55	Hungary	77	Azerbaijan	51
7	Armenia	53	Sweden	65	Serbia	45
8	Bulgaria	43	Moldova	46	Switzerland	40
9	Hungary	39	Poland	37	Sweden	25
10	Italy	36	Bulgaria	35	Germany	22

=== Men's freestyle ===
Event	Gold	Silver	Bronze
57 kg	Lev Pavlov; Authorised Neutral Athletes	Vasif Baghirov; Azerbaijan	Rassoul Galbouraev; France
57 kg	Lev Pavlov; Authorised Neutral Athletes	Vasif Baghirov; Azerbaijan	Hayko Gasparyan; Armenia
61 kg	Andrei Midlovets; Authorised Neutral Athletes	Jamal Abbasov; Azerbaijan	Tolga Özbek; Turkey
61 kg	Andrei Midlovets; Authorised Neutral Athletes	Jamal Abbasov; Azerbaijan	Viktor Borohan; Ukraine
65 kg	Abdullah Toprak; Turkey	Adam Arkhiev; Authorised Neutral Athletes	Valentyn Hryhoryshyn; Ukraine
65 kg	Abdullah Toprak; Turkey	Adam Arkhiev; Authorised Neutral Athletes	Alessandro Nini; Italy
70 kg	Magomed Baitukaev; Authorised Neutral Athletes	Alexandr Gaidarli; Moldova	Goga Otinashvili; Georgia
70 kg	Magomed Baitukaev; Authorised Neutral Athletes	Alexandr Gaidarli; Moldova	Rostislav Leicht; Germany
74 kg	Vadym Tsurkan; Ukraine	Giorgi Gogritchiani; Georgia	Tamir Eshinimaev; Authorised Neutral Athletes
74 kg	Vadym Tsurkan; Ukraine	Giorgi Gogritchiani; Georgia	Seyfulla Itaev; France
79 kg	Said Saidulov; Authorised Neutral Athletes	Cengizhan Doğan; Turkey	Paulius Leščauskas; Lithuania
79 kg	Said Saidulov; Authorised Neutral Athletes	Cengizhan Doğan; Turkey	Adam Kakhriev; France
86 kg	Ibragim Kadiev; Authorised Neutral Athletes	Sadig Mustafazade; Azerbaijan	Gabriele Niccolini; Italy
86 kg	Ibragim Kadiev; Authorised Neutral Athletes	Sadig Mustafazade; Azerbaijan	Alexandru Borș; Moldova
92 kg	Mustafagadzhi Malachdibirov; Authorised Neutral Athletes	Anar Jafarli; Azerbaijan	Sali Saliev; Bulgaria
92 kg	Mustafagadzhi Malachdibirov; Authorised Neutral Athletes	Anar Jafarli; Azerbaijan	Musza Arsunkaev; Hungary
97 kg	Khetag Karsanov; Azerbaijan	Shakhman Nukhaev; Authorised Neutral Athletes	Ramini Gulitashvili; Georgia
97 kg	Khetag Karsanov; Azerbaijan	Shakhman Nukhaev; Authorised Neutral Athletes	Rıfat Gıdak; Turkey
125 kg	Khabib Davudgadzhiev; Authorised Neutral Athletes	Hakan Büyükçıngıl; Turkey	Aleksandre Abramishvili; Georgia
125 kg	Khabib Davudgadzhiev; Authorised Neutral Athletes	Hakan Büyükçıngıl; Turkey	Yusif Dursunov; Azerbaijan

=== Men's Greco-Roman ===
Event	Gold	Silver	Bronze
55 kg	Papik Dzhavadian; Authorised Neutral Athletes	Maxim Sarmanov; Moldova	Péter Tótok; Hungary
55 kg	Papik Dzhavadian; Authorised Neutral Athletes	Maxim Sarmanov; Moldova	Şervan Çınar; Turkey
60 kg	Adam Silverin; Sweden	Dordzhi Shungurtsikov; Authorised Neutral Athletes	Servet Angı; Turkey
60 kg	Adam Silverin; Sweden	Dordzhi Shungurtsikov; Authorised Neutral Athletes	Tural Ahmadov; Azerbaijan
63 kg	Erzu Zakriev; Authorised Neutral Athletes	Anri Khozrevanidze; Georgia	Mahammad Shukurzade; Azerbaijan
63 kg	Erzu Zakriev; Authorised Neutral Athletes	Anri Khozrevanidze; Georgia	Yurik Hoveyan; Armenia
67 kg	Grair Oganesian; Authorised Neutral Athletes	Gaspar Terteryan; Armenia	Dávid Mányik; Hungary
67 kg	Grair Oganesian; Authorised Neutral Athletes	Gaspar Terteryan; Armenia	Rati Khozrevanidze; Georgia
72 kg	Rokas Čepauskas; Lithuania	Muhammed Ali Göçmen; Turkey	Illia Valeuski; Authorised Neutral Athletes
72 kg	Rokas Čepauskas; Lithuania	Muhammed Ali Göçmen; Turkey	Ruslan Nurullayev; Azerbaijan
77 kg	Levente Lévai; Hungary	Alexandru Solovei; Moldova	Gamzat Gadzhiev; Authorised Neutral Athletes
77 kg	Levente Lévai; Hungary	Alexandru Solovei; Moldova	Tornike Mikeladze; Georgia
82 kg	Alperen Berber; Turkey	Ismail Rzayev; Azerbaijan	Ramazan Pashaiev; Ukraine
82 kg	Alperen Berber; Turkey	Ismail Rzayev; Azerbaijan	Erik Ter-Matevosyan; Armenia
87 kg	Achiko Bolkvadze; Georgia	Hamza Sertcanli; Sweden	Aleksandr Krikukha; Authorised Neutral Athletes
87 kg	Achiko Bolkvadze; Georgia	Hamza Sertcanli; Sweden	Andrija Mihajlović; Serbia
97 kg	Yehor Yakushenko; Ukraine	Darius Kiefer; Germany	Sebastian Warchoł; Poland
97 kg	Yehor Yakushenko; Ukraine	Darius Kiefer; Germany	Maksim Averin; Authorised Neutral Athletes
130 kg	Saba Chilashvili; Georgia	Cemal Yusuf Bakır; Turkey	Marko Milanović; Croatia
130 kg	Saba Chilashvili; Georgia	Cemal Yusuf Bakır; Turkey	Alan Dzabiev; Bulgaria

=== Women's freestyle ===
Event	Gold	Silver	Bronze
50 kg	Aida Kerymova; Ukraine	Svenja Jungo; Switzerland	Violetta Biriukova; Authorised Neutral Athletes
50 kg	Aida Kerymova; Ukraine	Svenja Jungo; Switzerland	Roberta Luostarinen; Finland
53 kg	Olga Ovchinnikova; Authorised Neutral Athletes	Sofiia Marchenko; Ukraine	Carla Jaume; Spain
53 kg	Olga Ovchinnikova; Authorised Neutral Athletes	Sofiia Marchenko; Ukraine	Liliána Kapuvári; Hungary
55 kg	Tuba Demir; Turkey	Marta Hetmanava; Authorised Neutral Athletes	Milica Sekulović; Serbia
55 kg	Tuba Demir; Turkey	Marta Hetmanava; Authorised Neutral Athletes	Ekaterina Chikanova; Authorised Neutral Athletes
57 kg	Alina Filipovych; Ukraine	Volha Hardzei; Authorised Neutral Athletes	Gerda Terék; Hungary
57 kg	Alina Filipovych; Ukraine	Volha Hardzei; Authorised Neutral Athletes	Dolzhon Tsyngueva; Authorised Neutral Athletes
59 kg	Ruzanna Mammadova; Azerbaijan	Elena Kurova; Authorised Neutral Athletes	Ana Maria Puiu; Romania
59 kg	Ruzanna Mammadova; Azerbaijan	Elena Kurova; Authorised Neutral Athletes	Sevim Akbaş; Turkey
62 kg	Iryna Bondar; Ukraine	Annatina Lippuner; Switzerland	Nicola Wasilewska; Poland
62 kg	Iryna Bondar; Ukraine	Annatina Lippuner; Switzerland	Amelia Samuelsson; Sweden
65 kg	Enikő Elekes; Hungary	Beyza Nur Akkuş; Turkey	Alicja Nowosad; Poland
65 kg	Enikő Elekes; Hungary	Beyza Nur Akkuş; Turkey	Margarita Salnazarian; Authorised Neutral Athletes
68 kg	Alina Shevchenko; Authorised Neutral Athletes	Alina Shauchuk; Authorised Neutral Athletes	Ayşe Erkan; Turkey
68 kg	Alina Shevchenko; Authorised Neutral Athletes	Alina Shauchuk; Authorised Neutral Athletes	Maria Panțîru; Romania
72 kg	Viktoryia Radzkova; Authorised Neutral Athletes	Bükrenaz Sert; Turkey	Noémi Osváth-Nagy; Hungary
72 kg	Viktoryia Radzkova; Authorised Neutral Athletes	Bükrenaz Sert; Turkey	Nadiia Sokolovska; Ukraine
76 kg	Elmira Yasin; Turkey	Diana Titova; Authorised Neutral Athletes	Veronika Nyikos; Hungary
76 kg	Elmira Yasin; Turkey	Diana Titova; Authorised Neutral Athletes	Aliaksandra Kazlova; Authorised Neutral Athletes

=== Participating nations ===
534 wrestlers from 35 countries:

1. Albania (3)
2. Armenia (19)
3. Austria (6)
4. Azerbaijan (26)
5. Belgium (4)
6. Bulgaria (29)
7. Croatia (6)
8. Czech Republic (7)
9. Denmark (4)
10. Spain (8)
11. Estonia (11)
12. Finland (9)
13. France (13)
14. United Kingdom (2)
15. Georgia (20)
16. Germany (20)
17. Greece (20)
18. Hungary (30)
19. Israel (5)
20. Italy (22)
21. Latvia (3)
22. Lithuania (11)
23. Moldova (22)
24. North Macedonia (6)
25. Netherlands (2)
26. Norway (8)
27. Poland (29)
28. Portugal (3)
29. Romania (21)
30. Serbia (19) (Host)
31. Switzerland (8)
32. Slovakia (9)
33. Sweden (10)
34. Turkey (30)
35. Ukraine (30)
36. Individual Neutral Athletes (59)

== U-17 ==
=== Competition schedule ===
All times are (UTC+2)

Date	Time	Event
24 June	10.30-14.00	Qualification rounds GR – 48-55-65-80-110 kg
24 June	18.00-19.30	Semi-finals GR – 48-55-65-80-110 kg
25 June	10.30-14.00	Qualification rounds GR – 45-51-60-71-92 kg; Repechage GR – 48-55-65-80-110 kg
25 June	17.00-18.00	Semi-finals: GR – 45-51-60-71-92 kg
25 June	18.00-20.00	Finals GR – 48-55-65-80-110 kg
26 June	10.30-14.00	Qualification rounds WW – 43-49-57-65-73 kg; Repechage GR – 45-51-60-71-92 kg
26 June	17.00-18.00	Semi-finals WW – 43-49-57-65-73 kg
26 June	18.00-20.00	Finals GR – 45-51-60-71-92 kg
27 June	10.30-14.00	Qualification rounds WW – 40-46-53-61-69 kg; Repechage WW – 43-49-57-65-73 kg
27 June	17.00-18.00	Semi-finals WW – 40-46-53-61-69 kg
27 June	18.00-20.00	Finals WW – 43-49-57-65-73 kg
28 June	10.30-14.00	Qualification rounds FS – 48-55-65-80-110 kg; Repechage WW – 40-46-53-61-69 kg
28 June	17.00-18.00	Semi-finals: FS – 48-55-65-80-110 kg
28 June	18.00-20.00	Finals WW – 40-46-53-61-69 kg
29 June	10.30-14.00	Qualification rounds FS – 45-51-60-71-92 kg; Repechage FS – 48-55-65-80-110 kg
29 June	16.45-18.00	Semi-finals: FS – 45-51-60-71-92 kg
29 June	18.00-21.00	Finals FS – 48-55-65-80-110 kg
30 June	17.00-17.45	Repechage : FS – 45-51-60-71-92 kg
30 June	18.00-20.00	Finals : FS – 45-51-60-71-92 kg

=== Medal table ===
* Host nation (Serbia)

Rank	Nation	Gold	Silver	Bronze	Total
–	Individual Neutral Athletes	13	7	9	29
1	Azerbaijan	5	5	9	19
2	Turkey	3	5	3	11
3	Germany	3	0	5	8
4	Armenia	2	3	6	11
5	Ukraine	2	1	10	13
6	Georgia	2	1	2	5
7	Hungary	0	2	4	6
8	Moldova	0	1	2	3
9	Bulgaria	0	1	1	2
9	Greece	0	1	1	2
11	France	0	1	0	1
11	Norway	0	1	0	1
11	Serbia*	0	1	0	1
14	Poland	0	0	2	2
14	Romania	0	0	2	2
14	Sweden	0	0	2	2
17	Croatia	0	0	1	1
17	Italy	0	0	1	1
Totals (18 entries)		30	30	60	120

=== Team ranking ===
Rank	Men's freestyle		Men's Greco-Roman		Women's freestyle	
Rank	Team	Points	Team	Points	Team	Points
1	Azerbaijan	160	Azerbaijan	183	Turkey	149
2	Armenia	124	Armenia	132	Germany	137
3	Turkey	119	Ukraine	121	Ukraine	99
4	Georgia	111	Georgia	75	Azerbaijan	85
5	Ukraine	78	Hungary	60	Hungary	69
6	Moldova	53	Bulgaria	59	Romania	50
7	Bulgaria	34	Germany	42	Poland	47
8	Poland	30	Turkey	40	France	36
9	Germany	29	Serbia	40	Moldova	35
10	Hungary	23	Romania	35	Georgia	27

=== Men's freestyle ===
Event	Gold	Silver	Bronze
45 kg	Dzhamal Bakaev; Authorised Neutral Athletes	Buğra Kavak; Turkey	Ion Rusu; Moldova
45 kg	Dzhamal Bakaev; Authorised Neutral Athletes	Buğra Kavak; Turkey	Artak Aghabekyan; Armenia
48 kg	Agashirin Agasherinov; Authorised Neutral Athletes	Eren Yalçın; Turkey	Hajihuseyn Ahmadzada; Azerbaijan
48 kg	Agashirin Agasherinov; Authorised Neutral Athletes	Eren Yalçın; Turkey	Armen Papikyan; Armenia
51 kg	Muhammad Ismayilov; Azerbaijan	Ralan Shogenov; Authorised Neutral Athletes	Mate Tsinadze; Georgia
51 kg	Muhammad Ismayilov; Azerbaijan	Ralan Shogenov; Authorised Neutral Athletes	Ashot Gyulnazaryan; Armenia
55 kg	Gagik Ghazaryan; Armenia	Baisangur Osmaev; Authorised Neutral Athletes	Huseyn Huseynov; Azerbaijan
55 kg	Gagik Ghazaryan; Armenia	Baisangur Osmaev; Authorised Neutral Athletes	Zorab Aloiev; Ukraine
60 kg	Ibragimgadzhi Magomedov; Authorised Neutral Athletes	Huseyn Ismayilov; Azerbaijan	Bilal İnce; Turkey
60 kg	Ibragimgadzhi Magomedov; Authorised Neutral Athletes	Huseyn Ismayilov; Azerbaijan	Prokip Kralia; Ukraine
65 kg	Isa Yusibov; Azerbaijan	Iasin Bersanukaev; Authorised Neutral Athletes	Rati Revazashvili; Georgia
65 kg	Isa Yusibov; Azerbaijan	Iasin Bersanukaev; Authorised Neutral Athletes	Yeghishe Mosesyan; Armenia
71 kg	Arslan Mirzayev; Authorised Neutral Athletes	Catalin Spinu; Moldova	Márk Laposa; Hungary
71 kg	Arslan Mirzayev; Authorised Neutral Athletes	Catalin Spinu; Moldova	Fatih Aydın; Turkey
80 kg	Aldat Kesaev; Authorised Neutral Athletes	Nikoloz Maisuradze; Georgia	Sahak Hovhannisyan; Armenia
80 kg	Aldat Kesaev; Authorised Neutral Athletes	Nikoloz Maisuradze; Georgia	Felix Schmitt; Germany
92 kg	Konstantine Petriashvili; Georgia	Nikolaos Karavanos; Greece	Roland Pukhaev; Authorised Neutral Athletes
92 kg	Konstantine Petriashvili; Georgia	Nikolaos Karavanos; Greece	Aliaksei Khadunou; Authorised Neutral Athletes
110 kg	Movsar Saidulaev; Authorised Neutral Athletes	Muhammad Gantemirov; Azerbaijan	Uğur İrtegün; Turkey
110 kg	Movsar Saidulaev; Authorised Neutral Athletes	Muhammad Gantemirov; Azerbaijan	Yaraslau Kokhan; Authorised Neutral Athletes

=== Men's Greco-Roman ===
Event	Gold	Silver	Bronze
45 kg	Marat Atshemyan; Armenia	Aslanbek Kostoev; Authorised Neutral Athletes	László Szuromi; Hungary
45 kg	Marat Atshemyan; Armenia	Aslanbek Kostoev; Authorised Neutral Athletes	Nihat Isgandarli; Azerbaijan
48 kg	Nikolai Kristov; Authorised Neutral Athletes	Amrah Amrahov; Azerbaijan	Bohdan Makarovets; Ukraine
48 kg	Nikolai Kristov; Authorised Neutral Athletes	Amrah Amrahov; Azerbaijan	Santosh Tharmalingam; Sweden
51 kg	Turan Dashdamirov; Azerbaijan	Yurik Mkhitaryan; Armenia	Luis Vlad; Romania
51 kg	Turan Dashdamirov; Azerbaijan	Yurik Mkhitaryan; Armenia	Maksut Sultanov; Ukraine
55 kg	Ilia Kandalin; Authorised Neutral Athletes	Alyosha Iliev; Bulgaria	David Gabedava; Georgia
55 kg	Ilia Kandalin; Authorised Neutral Athletes	Alyosha Iliev; Bulgaria	Ali Nazarov; Azerbaijan
60 kg	Aykhan Javadov; Azerbaijan	Aleks Margaryan; Armenia	Vadym Matros; Ukraine
60 kg	Aykhan Javadov; Azerbaijan	Aleks Margaryan; Armenia	Marat Margiev; Authorised Neutral Athletes
65 kg	Vladyslav Pokotylo; Ukraine	Dzhabrail Umkhadzhiev; Authorised Neutral Athletes	Narek Grigorian; Armenia
65 kg	Vladyslav Pokotylo; Ukraine	Dzhabrail Umkhadzhiev; Authorised Neutral Athletes	Kevin Karl; Germany
71 kg	Kiryl Valeuski; Authorised Neutral Athletes	Yusif Ahmadli; Azerbaijan	Imre Kolompár; Hungary
71 kg	Kiryl Valeuski; Authorised Neutral Athletes	Yusif Ahmadli; Azerbaijan	Vladislav Byrlia; Authorised Neutral Athletes
80 kg	Mikhail Shkarin; Authorised Neutral Athletes	Yiğit Hamza Sarı; Turkey	Orkhan Hajiyev; Azerbaijan
80 kg	Mikhail Shkarin; Authorised Neutral Athletes	Yiğit Hamza Sarı; Turkey	Yassine Ben Labed; Poland
92 kg	Said Pashayev; Azerbaijan	Stevan Kojić; Serbia	Ole Ayke Sterning; Germany
92 kg	Said Pashayev; Azerbaijan	Stevan Kojić; Serbia	Radostin Vasilev; Bulgaria
110 kg	Ivan Yankovskyi; Ukraine	Seyran Kirakosyan; Armenia	Mikayil Ismayilov; Azerbaijan
110 kg	Ivan Yankovskyi; Ukraine	Seyran Kirakosyan; Armenia	Petros Kurginian; Authorised Neutral Athletes

=== Women's freestyle ===
Event	Gold	Silver	Bronze
40 kg	Aleksandra Fedorova; Authorised Neutral Athletes	Kamila Kuchma; Ukraine	Vivien Szentpál; Hungary
40 kg	Aleksandra Fedorova; Authorised Neutral Athletes	Kamila Kuchma; Ukraine	Nazrin Ahmadli; Azerbaijan
43 kg	Aleksandra Berezovskaia; Authorised Neutral Athletes	Fatma Yılmaz; Turkey	Lara Blažeković; Croatia
43 kg	Aleksandra Berezovskaia; Authorised Neutral Athletes	Fatma Yılmaz; Turkey	Sally Malmgren; Sweden
46 kg	Halilja Azimov; Germany	Daniella Beky; Norway	Yevheniia Druzenko; Ukraine
46 kg	Halilja Azimov; Germany	Daniella Beky; Norway	Maria Gkika; Greece
49 kg	Nil Aktaş; Turkey	Szonja Németh; Hungary	Olena Kolubai; Ukraine
49 kg	Nil Aktaş; Turkey	Szonja Németh; Hungary	Angela Casarola; Italy
53 kg	Olesia Malakhova; Authorised Neutral Athletes	Fatima Bayramova; Azerbaijan	Ivanna Lukianenko; Ukraine
53 kg	Olesia Malakhova; Authorised Neutral Athletes	Fatima Bayramova; Azerbaijan	Maryia Khrushcheva; Authorised Neutral Athletes
57 kg	Miranda Kapanadze; Georgia	Özlem Gürsoy; Turkey	Feenja Hermann; Germany
57 kg	Miranda Kapanadze; Georgia	Özlem Gürsoy; Turkey	Dolzhon Tsyngueva; Authorised Neutral Athletes
61 kg	Leonie Steigert; Germany	Éda Balázs; Hungary	Gunay Gurbanova; Azerbaijan
61 kg	Leonie Steigert; Germany	Éda Balázs; Hungary	Zuzanna Horbik; Poland
65 kg	Beyza Nur Akkuş; Turkey	Daria Frolova; Authorised Neutral Athletes	Konstantsiia Sarbaieva; Ukraine
65 kg	Beyza Nur Akkuş; Turkey	Daria Frolova; Authorised Neutral Athletes	Ayla Şahin; Germany
69 kg	İlayda Çin; Turkey	Lise Landouzy; France	Zahra Karimzada; Azerbaijan
69 kg	İlayda Çin; Turkey	Lise Landouzy; France	Alexandra Moisei; Moldova
73 kg	Lotta Englich; Germany	Diana Titova; Authorised Neutral Athletes	Khrystyna Demchuk; Ukraine
73 kg	Lotta Englich; Germany	Diana Titova; Authorised Neutral Athletes	Hanna Pirskaya; Authorised Neutral Athletes

=== Participating nations ===
524 wrestlers from 36 countries:

1. Albania (7)
2. Armenia (20)
3. Austria (6)
4. Azerbaijan (27)
5. Belgium (1)
6. Bulgaria (28)
7. Croatia (7)
8. Czech Republic (9)
9. Denmark (1)
10. Spain (9)
11. Estonia (10)
12. Finland (7)
13. France (8)
14. United Kingdom (2)
15. Georgia (23)
16. Germany (24)
17. Greece (20)
18. Hungary (26)
19. Ireland (2)
20. Israel (7)
21. Italy (16)
22. Latvia (6)
23. Lithuania (8)
24. Moldova (15)
25. North Macedonia (7)
26. Netherlands (2)
27. Norway (6)
28. Poland (27)
29. Romania (20)
30. Slovenia (1)
31. Serbia (15) (Host)
32. Switzerland (4)
33. Slovakia (13)
34. Sweden (12)
35. Turkey (30)
36. Ukraine (30)
37. Individual Neutral Athletes (60)
